= Tapner =

Tapner is a surname. Notable people with the surname include:

- John Tapner (1823–1854), English murderer
- Rory Tapner (born 1959), British businessman
- Rosie Tapner (born 1995), English model and television presenter

== See also ==
- Tanner (surname)
- Tapper (surname)
