= Taper =

Taper may refer to:

- Part of an object in the shape of a cone (conical)
- Taper (transmission line), a transmission line gradually increasing or decreasing in size
- Fishing rod taper, a measure of the flexibility of a fishing rod
- Conically tapered joints, made of ground glass, commonly used in chemistry labs to mate two glassware components fitted with glass tubings
- Luer taper, a standardized fitting system used for making leak-free connections between slightly conical syringe tips and needles
- Tapered thread, a conical screw thread made of a helicoidal ridge wrapped around a cone
- Machine taper, in machinery and engineering
- Mark Taper Forum, a theatre in the Los Angeles Music Center
- A ratio used in aeronautics (see Chord (aeronautics))
  - Type of wing configuration in aeronautics (Wing_configuration#Chord_variation_along_span)
- A thin candle
- Philadelphia Tapers (also New York Tapers and Washington Tapers), a defunct professional basketball team
- Taper (cymbal), the reduction in thickness of a cymbal from center to rim
- Taper pin, used in manufacturing
- Taper insertion pin, used in body piercing
- Taper (concert), a person who records audio concerts, usually via portable setup
- Taper, a type of men's haircut (see crew cut)

== See also ==
- Tapering (disambiguation)
- Tapper (disambiguation)
- Tapir (disambiguation)
