= Matt Bloom =

American professional wrestler (born 1972)

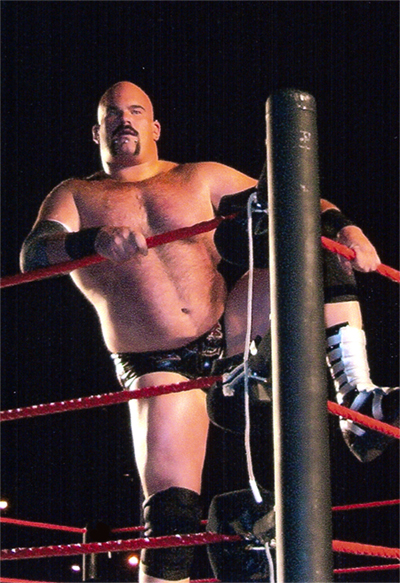
- Bloom in 2004
- Born: Matthew Jason Bloom; November 14, 1972 (age 53); Peabody, Massachusetts, U.S.
- Education: University of Pittsburgh
- Spouse: Farah Louise (m. 2005)
- Children: 2
- Professional wrestling career
- Ring name(s): Albert; A-Train; Baldo; Big Buford; Giant Bernard; Jason Albert; Lord Tensai; Matt Bloom; Prince Albert; Rusher Road; Sweet T Tensai
- Billed height: 6 ft 7 in (201 cm)
- Billed weight: 331 lb (150 kg)
- Billed from: Boston, Massachusetts; Japan
- Trained by: Killer Kowalski; Dory Funk Jr.
- Debut: 1997
- Retired: August 7, 2014
- Football career

No. 73
- Positions: Offensive tackle, offensive guard

Career information
- College: Pittsburgh
- NFL draft: 1995: undrafted

Matthew Jason Bloom (born November 14, 1972) is an American retired professional wrestler. He is signed to WWE, where he is the head trainer at the WWE Performance Center in Orlando, Florida.

Bloom is best known for his in-ring appearances with WWE as Prince Albert, Albert and A-Train from 1999 to 2004, and as Lord Tensai and Tensai from 2012 to 2014, as well as for his appearances in Japan from 2005 to 2012 with All Japan Pro Wrestling (AJPW), New Japan Pro-Wrestling (NJPW) and Pro Wrestling Noah (Noah) as Giant Bernard (ジャイアント・バーナード, Jaianto Bānādo). Championships held by Bloom over the course of his career include the GHC Tag Team Championship, IWGP Tag Team Championship and WWF Intercontinental Championship.

== Early life ==
Bloom was born in Peabody, Massachusetts. He attended Peabody Veterans Memorial High School, where he earned three letters in football and basketball, two in track and field, and one in baseball. Bloom also attended Camp Tevya in Brookline, New Hampshire in the early 1980s, and went on to attend the University of Pittsburgh, where he played football as an offensive tackle and an offensive guard. Bloom graduated in 1996 with a degree in sign language. He then became a schoolteacher, teaching mathematics and English to children with behavioral problems and deaf children at Revere High School. After rewarding his three most apt students with a trip to a professional wrestling event, Bloom, who as a child had aspired to wrestle professionally, met wrestler and wrestling trainer Killer Kowalski and expressed an interest in learning how to wrestle. Kowalski invited Bloom to attend his school, and Bloom opted to leave teaching and train as a wrestler.

== Professional wrestling career ==
=== Early career (1997–1999) ===
Trained by Killer Kowalski and Dory Funk Jr., Bloom made his professional wrestling debut in Connecticut for Century Wrestling Alliance in 1997. Bloom wrestled his first match in the WWA on May 15, 1998, facing Tiger Ali Singh in a loss, during his brief time in WWA he wrestled notable names such as Sgt. Slaughter and Bart Gunn. In November 1998, Bloom made his NWA debut losing to Shawn Stasiak. During his stay in NWA, Bloom and Bull Pain challenged Nick Dinsmore and Rob Conway for the NWA OVW Southern tag team titles ending in a no contest. He briefly wrestled as Baldo, a gimmick given to him by referee Freddy Sparta that saw him wear a fur rug to the ring.

After being introduced to talent scout Tom Prichard by George Steele, Bloom was hired by the World Wrestling Federation (WWF). After receiving supplementary training from Dory Funk Jr., Bloom was assigned to the Power Pro Wrestling developmental territory in Memphis, Tennessee, where he wrestled as Baldo. While wrestling in PPW, Bloom won both the Young Guns Championship and the Heavyweight Championship, and engaged in a feud with Memphis mainstay Jerry Lawler, where he defeated him to become the inaugural PPW Heavyweight champion.

=== World Wrestling Federation / Entertainment (1999-2004) ===
==== Prince Albert (1999–2000) ====
Bloom debuted on WWF television on the April 11, 1999, episode of Sunday Night Heat, saving Droz from a beating at the hands of Big Boss Man. Introduced as the personal body artist of Droz, Bloom was dubbed Prince Albert (referencing the Prince Albert genital piercing). On the April 25 episode of Heat, Albert made his in-ring debut by teaming with Droz to defeat Brian Christopher and Scott Taylor. Albert's first singles match occurred on the May 8 episode of Shotgun Saturday Night, in which he lost to Meat. Shortly after, Albert and Droz formed a short-lived trio with Key. Albert picked up his first win in WWF on the June 27 edition of Heat, by defeating Val Venis in a street fight after assistance by Droz. Droz and Albert attacked Venis until his tag team partner The Godfather made the save. This led to Albert and Droz facing Godfather and Venis in a match on the July 4 episode of Heat.

Droz and Albert continued to team together and received several shots for the WWF Tag Team Championship against Hardy Boyz (Matt and Jeff) but failed to win the titles. Droz and Albert then resolved their rivalry with Venis and Godfather by losing to them in a street fight on the July 26 episode of Raw is War. They also competed in a Tag Team Turmoil match at SummerSlam on August 22, to earn a future title shot, but were eliminated by Edge and Christian. Albert received his first singles title shot against D-Lo Brown for his European and Intercontinental Championship on the August 21 episode of Shotgun. The team of Droz and Albert prematurely disbanded when Droz was legitimately paralyzed in October 1999, and Albert would then unsuccessfully challenge Brown for the European Championship on the October 17 episode of Heat. Shortly after, Albert became the protege of the Big Boss Man, and became a part of Boss Man's team, consisting of Mideon and Viscera, who lost to The Big Show in a handicap Survivor Series match at Survivor Series on November 14. Boss Man and Albert would challenge Big Show for the WWF Championship in a losing effort in a handicap match on the December 13 episode of Raw is War.

On January 23, 2000, Albert competed in his first Royal Rumble match at the Royal Rumble as the #21 entrant. He was eliminated by Kane. Shortly after, the team of Albert and Boss Man separated following the debut of Bull Buchanan, who formed a tag team with the Big Boss Man.

==== T & A (2000–2001) ====
In March, Prince Albert was recruited by Trish Stratus to form a tag team with Test, with his name being shortened to Albert at WrestleMania 2000 on April 2 in a tag team match with Test against Head Cheese (Al Snow and Steve Blackman), which Test and Albert won. The tag team, known as T & A, competed in the tag team division throughout 2000, and feuded with various rival tag teams. Their first rivalry was against Dudley Boyz (Bubba Ray and D-Von), which saw the two teams trade wins in a series of matches including a match at Backlash on April 30, which T & A won. At King of the Ring on June 25, T & A competed against Too Cool (Grand Master Sexay and Scotty 2 Hotty), The Hardy Boyz (Matt and Jeff), and Edge and Christian in a four corners elimination match for the Tag Team Championship, which they failed to win. Following the event, T & A began feuding with Hardy Boyz, which led to T & A and Trish Stratus taking on Hardy Boyz and Lita in a losing effort at Fully Loaded on July 23.

In October, T & A began feuding with the Acolytes Protection Agency (Bradshaw and Faarooq), leading to T & A and Stratus facing Lita and APA in a match at No Mercy on October 22, which ended in a no contest. T & A and Stratus would then begin feuding with Holly Cousins (Crash, Hardcore and Molly), which lead to T & A and Stratus facing Crash, Molly and Steve Blackman in a match at Survivor Series on November 19, which Stratus and T & A lost. The feud ended on the November 27 episode of Raw is War, where Holly Cousins defeated T & A and Stratus. At Rebellion on December 2, T & A competed against Dudley Boyz and Edge and Christian in a triple threat elimination tables match, which Dudley Boyz won. On the December 28 episode of SmackDown!, T & A dissolved when Albert attacked Test under the orders of Stephanie McMahon-Helmsley after T & A won a match against Too Cool. As a result, Albert and Stratus briefly feuded with Test, defeating him in a handicap match on the January 8, 2001, episode of Raw is War.

==== X-Factor and The Zoo Crew (2001–2002) ====
After moving to singles competition, Albert participated in the Royal Rumble match at the Royal Rumble on January 21 as the #17 entrant, being eliminated by Kane. Over the following months, he wrestled primarily at house shows and on Jakked and Heat. In March, Albert formed a faction with Justin Credible and X-Pac called X-Factor. The group feuded with the Dudley Boyz (Bubba Ray, D-Von and Spike), defeating them in a six-man tag team match at Backlash on April 29. On the June 28 episode of SmackDown!, Albert defeated Kane in a no disqualification match, following assistance by Diamond Dallas Page to win the WWF Intercontinental Championship, his first and only title in the WWF. During this time, Credible left X-Factor and joined The Alliance. Albert held the Intercontinental Championship for a month, retaining the title against The Undertaker, Edge, Rhyno, former X-Factor teammate Justin Credible, and Tommy Dreamer. At Invasion on July 22, Albert represented the WWF by teaming with Billy Gunn and Big Show against Alliance's Chris Kanyon, Hugh Morrus and Shawn Stasiak in a losing effort. The following night, Albert lost the Intercontinental Championship to Alliance member Lance Storm on the July 23 episode of Raw is War, after several wrestlers interfered. Following the title loss, Albert and X-Pac continued X-Factor as a tag team until November, when X-Pac was sidelined with an injury.

Albert would then begin teaming with Scotty 2 Hotty after defeating him in a match on the November 4 episode of Heat. On the November 10 episode of Jakked, Albert and Scotty teamed for the first time and defeated Alliance members Raven and Hugh Morrus, turning Albert into a fan favorite. Albert was nicknamed "The Hip Hop Hippo" as he danced with Scotty after matches and became a comical character. At Survivor Series on November 18, Albert participated in a battle royal, with the winner getting immunity from being fired regardless of the result of the match between WWF and Alliance. Albert was eliminated by Billy Kidman and Test. At Vengeance on December 9, Zoo Crew defeated Christian and Test. On the December 13 episode of SmackDown!, Albert and Scotty's team was named Zoo Crew as they teamed with Tazz to defeat Christian and Dudley Boyz in a six-man tag team match. On the December 17 episode of Raw is War, Zoo Crew unsuccessfully challenged Dudley Boyz for the WWF Tag Team Championship.

On January 20, 2002, Albert participated in the Royal Rumble match as the #17 entrant. He was eliminated by Christian and Chuck. On the January 24 episode of SmackDown!, Zoo Crew unsuccessfully challenged Spike Dudley and Tazz for the WWF Tag Team Championship. At No Way Out on February 17, Zoo Crew participated in a tag team turmoil match to determine the #1 contenders for the WWF Tag Team Championship. The APA won the match. In March, the WWF roster was divided into two brands, and both Albert and Scotty were assigned to the SmackDown! brand. They disbanded on the April 4 episode of SmackDown! when Albert attacked Scotty after the duo failed to defeat Billy and Chuck for the WWF Tag Team Championship, turning Albert into a villain. Albert defeated Scotty on the following episode of SmackDown!. Albert then moved to singles competition, changing his attire to wresltign trunks and mainly competing on Velocity for the next several months. During that time, Albert made a pay-per-view appearance at Rebellion on October 26, where he lost to Rikishi in a Kiss My Ass match.

==== A-Train (2002–2004) ====
Albert competed in his first match on SmackDown! since July, on the December 5 episode of SmackDown! by defeating Rey Mysterio in a short match. Albert continued to attack Mysterio after the match, until Mysterio's tag team partner Edge made the save. The following week, on SmackDown!, Albert joined forces with Paul Heyman and Big Show, which saw Heyman persuade him to rename himself to A-Train and debut new attire, the latter of which saw fans often chant "Shave Your Back!" at him during his matches due to his hairy torso. Following the name change, A-Train continued his rivalry with Edge, losing to him via disqualification after a chair shot at Armageddon on December 15. On the December 19 episode of SmackDown!, A-Train and Edge had a rematch, which A-Train decisively lost via pinfall.

On January 19, 2003 at the Royal Rumble, A-Train participated in the Royal Rumble match as the #25 entrant. He was eliminated by Kane and Rob Van Dam. A-Train would then continue his alliance with Big Show as they lost to The Undertaker in a handicap match at WrestleMania XIX on March 30, after assistance by The Undertaker's originally supposed partner Nathan Jones, who was attacked earlier in the show. A-Train continued the feud with The Undertaker by costing him a match against John Cena on the August 7 episode of SmackDown!. This culminated in a match between A-Train and The Undertaker at SummerSlam on August 24, which A-Train lost. A-Train then lost to Chris Benoit at No Mercy on October 19 and, at Survivor Series on November 16, was on Brock Lesnar's team in a ten-man Survivor Series match in a losing effort to Kurt Angle's team, in which he was pinned by Bradshaw. On the January 22, 2004, episode of SmackDown!, A-Train defeated Shannon Moore to qualify for the 2004 Royal Rumble match, which he failed to win after being eliminated by the eventual winner, Chris Benoit. After Benoit decided to wrestle Triple H for the World Heavyweight Championship on the Raw brand, General Manager Paul Heyman held a SmackDown! brand-exclusive Royal Rumble on the January 29 episode of SmackDown!, to determine who would meet Lesnar for the WWE Championship at No Way Out on February 15. A-Train was eliminated by the eventual winner Eddie Guerrero.

A-Train was traded to the Raw brand on March 22 before making his official Raw debut on June 7, losing to Chris Jericho. His last match was a loss to Val Venis on Heat. Two weeks later, he was sidelined with a torn rotator cuff and was released from his WWE contract on November 1, before he could return.

=== Various Promotions (2005) ===
After being released by WWE, Bloom worked for the independent promotion, Impact Zone Wrestling in Arizona in February 2005. He became IZW Heavyweight Champion and brought the title to Japan where he retained his title against Billy Gunn.

In the summer of 2005, he worked in Italy for Itlain Championship Wresltign where he feuded with his former tag partner, Test.

=== All Japan Pro Wrestling (2005–2006) ===
In March 2005, Bloom began wrestling for the Japanese All Japan Pro Wrestling promotion, adopting the ring name "Giant Bernard" (a reference to wrestler Brute Bernard). He went on to join the Voodoo Murders stable alongside fellow WWE alumni Chuck Palumbo and Johnny Stamboli. On October 18, 2005, Bloom unsuccessfully challenged Satoshi Kojima for the Triple Crown Heavyweight Championship.

=== New Japan Pro-Wrestling (2006-2012) ===
==== Various feuds (2006–2009) ====
In January 2006, Bloom left AJPW and joined the rival New Japan Pro-Wrestling (NJPW) promotion. In April 2006, he defeated Yuji Nagata in the finals of the 2006 New Japan Cup. As a result of his victory, Bloom received a shot at the IWGP Heavyweight Championship. He unsuccessfully challenged IWGP Heavyweight Champion Brock Lesnar on May 3, 2006, in Tenjin, Chūō-ku, Fukuoka.

In July 2006, following the abdication of the IWGP Heavyweight Championship by Lesnar, Bloom entered a tournament for the title, losing to Hiroshi Tanahashi in the tournament final. In August 2006, Bloom took part in the 2006 G1 Climax Tournament, losing to Hiroyoshi Tenzan in the semifinals.

On March 11, 2007, in Nagoya, Bloom and Travis Tomko defeated Manabu Nakanishi and Takao Omori to win the IWGP Tag Team Championship. At the February 17, 2008, New Japan show, they lost the IWGP Tag Team Championship to Togi Makabe and Toru Yano. Following Tomko's departure for Total Nonstop Action Wrestling on a full-time basis, Bernard began teaming with former World Championship Wrestling wrestler Rick Fuller in another powerhouse tag team. On September 5, 2008, Bernard and Fuller betrayed Shinsuke Nakamura and Hirooki Goto to align themselves with Togi Makabe's Great Bash Heel stable.

In addition to wrestling for NJPW, Bloom also wrestled for their affiliate Wrestle Land as Rusher Road, where he was a member of the Roads stable until the brand's closure.

==== Bad Intentions (2009–2012) ====
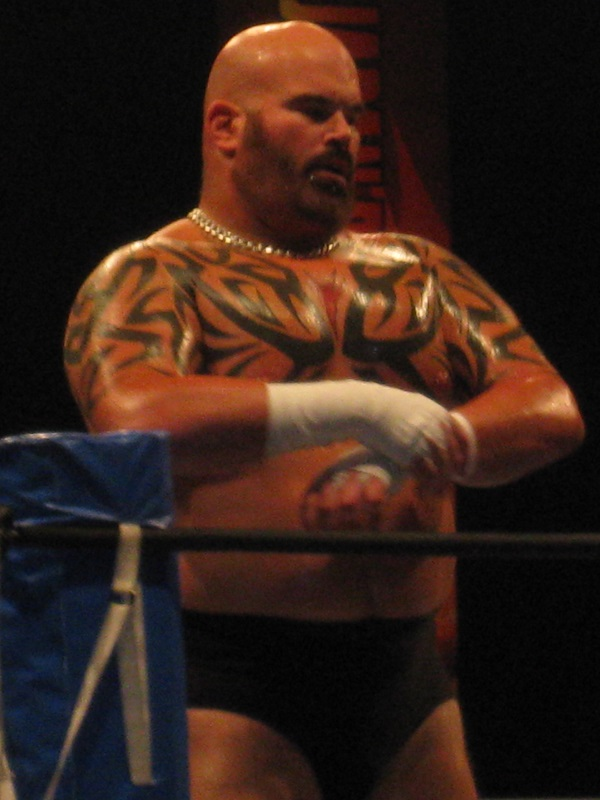
Bloom as Giant Bernard in 2012.

In 2009, after betraying Togi Makabe, Bernard and the rest of GBH left the stable to join Shinsuke Nakamura and form the new stable known as CHAOS. Bernard formed the tag team Bad Intentions with CHAOS partner Karl Anderson and together the two of them went on to win that year's G1 Tag League after defeating Apollo 55 (Prince Devitt and Ryusuke Taguchi) in the finals of the tournament on November 1. They went on to challenge for the IWGP Tag Team Championship, but their match with the defending champions Team 3D (Brother Ray and Brother Devon) at Destruction '09 ended in a double countout. In April 2010, both Bernard and Anderson left CHAOS when the stable turned on them.

Through NJPW's working agreement with Consejo Mundial de Lucha Libre, Bloom did his first tour of Mexico in May 2010, where he and Anderson managed to win six successive Two-out-of-Three Falls tag team matches in two straight falls, before he lost his final match of the tour on June 11 via disqualification. Upon his return to Japan, Bernard and Anderson defeated the teams of Seigigun (Yuji Nagata and Wataru Inoue) and No Limit (Tetsuya Naito and Yujiro Takahashi) in a Three-Way Elimination match on June 19 at Dominion 6.19 to win the IWGP Tag Team Championship. Bad Intentions made their first successful defense of the IWGP Tag Team Championship on July 19, defeating Seigigun and No Limit in a three-way "Dogfight". In late October, Bad Intentions entered the 2010 G1 Tag League, where, after three wins and two losses, they finished second in their block. This put them in the semifinals where, on November 7, they were defeated by eventual winners Yuji Nagata and Wataru Inoue. On January 4, 2011, at Wrestle Kingdom V in Tokyo Dome, Bad Intentions successfully defended the IWGP Tag Team Championship in a three-way match against Beer Money, Inc. (James Storm and Robert Roode) and Muscle Orchestra (Manabu Nakanishi and Strong Man). On May 3, Bad Intentions defeated No Limit to make their seventh successful IWGP Tag Team Championship defense, tying the record for most defenses, set by Hiroyoshi Tenzan and Masahiro Chono.

Bad Intentions made their record-breaking eighth successful IWGP Tag Team Championship defense on June 18 at Dominion 6.18 against Pro Wrestling Noah's Takuma Sano and Yoshihiro Takayama, and in the process also became the new GHC Tag Team Champions upon defeating Sano and Takayama for the title. After the main event of the show, Bernard challenged Hiroshi Tanahashi for the IWGP Heavyweight Championship, which Tanahashi said he would accept, if Bad Intentions beat him in a match for the IWGP Tag Team Championship, alongside the man he just defeated - Hirooki Goto. On July 3, Bernard and Anderson successfully defended the IWGP Tag Team Championship against Tanahashi and Goto. By winning, Bernard earned an IWGP Heavyweight Championship match against Tanahashi on July 18, but failed.

On July 23, Bad Intentions made an appearance for Pro Wrestling Noah, making their first successful defense of the GHC Tag Team Championship against the team of Takeshi Morishima and Yutaka Yoshie. On September 9, Bad Intentions became the longest reigning IWGP Tag Team Champions, breaking the previous record of 446 days set by Hiroyoshi Tenzan and Masahiro Chono in 2003. Bad Intentions made their second GHC Tag Team Championship defense on October 31, defeating Go Shiozaki and Shuhei Taniguchi at a Pro Wrestling Noah event. During New Japan's 2011 G1 Tag League, Bad Intentions suffered their first tag team loss in a year, when they were defeated by the Complete Players (Masato Tanaka and Yujiro Takahashi), but still managed to win their four other matches and advance to the semifinals of the tournament. On November 6, after defeating the Billion Powers (Hirooki Goto and Hiroshi Tanahashi) in the semifinals, Bad Intentions were defeated in the final of the 2011 G1 Climax by Suzuki-gun (Minoru Suzuki and Lance Archer). On November 12 at Power Struggle, Bad Intentions made their tenth successful IWGP Tag Team Championship defense against Archer and Suzuki.

On January 4, 2012, at Wrestle Kingdom VI in Tokyo Dome, Bad Intentions lost the IWGP Tag Team Championship to Tencozy (Hiroyoshi Tenzan and Satoshi Kojima), ending their record-setting reign at 564 days. They followed suit with their other title on January 22, losing the GHC Tag Team Championship to Akitoshi Saito and Jun Akiyama.

=== Return to WWE (2012–present) ===
==== Lord Tensai (2012–2013) ====
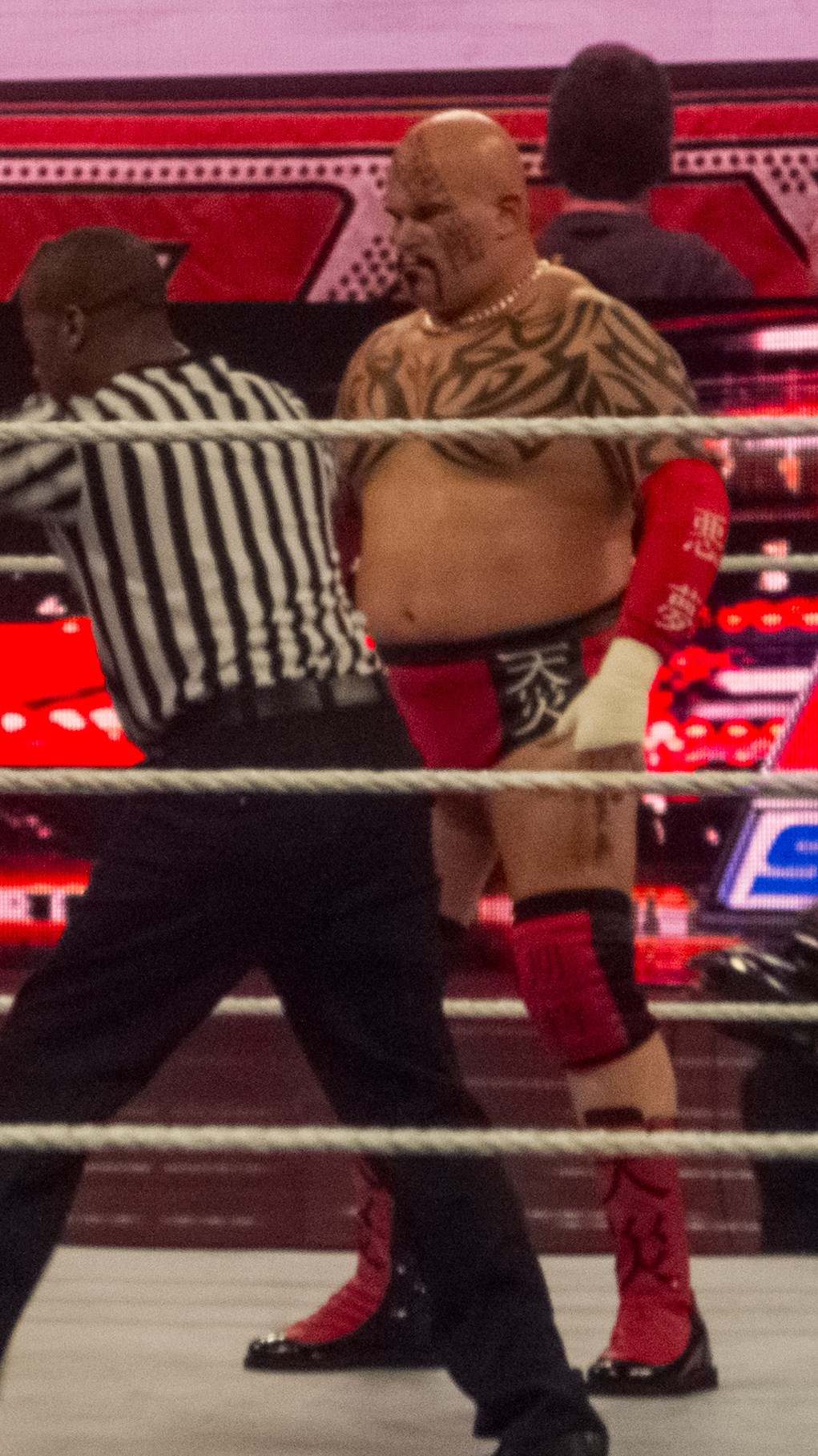
Bloom, as Lord Tensai (which was later shortened to Tensai) making his WWE return on Raw.

On March 17, 2012, it was reported that Bloom had re-signed with WWE. Bloom publicly denied the signing; however, on the March 19 episode of Raw, he appeared in a vignette under the new ring name "Lord Tensai" (天災). On the April 2 episode of Raw, Bloom made his WWE re-debut as Lord Tensai, where he was accompanied by his follower Sakamoto before defeating Alex Riley. In the following weeks, Tensai went on a winning streak, scoring pinfall victories over lower card wrestlers and even main stars including John Cena and WWE Champion CM Punk.

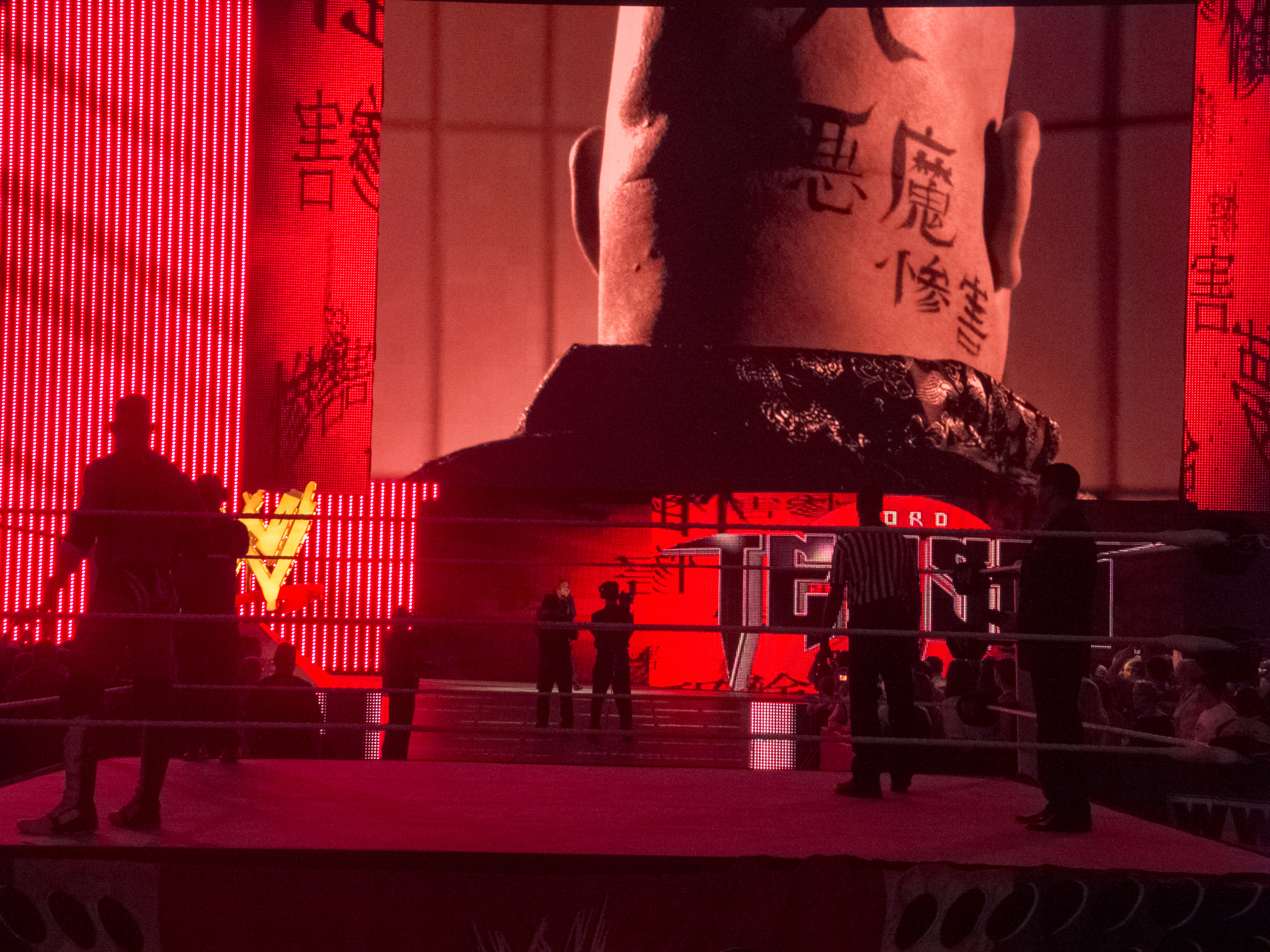
Bloom, as Lord Tensai, making his way to the ring

On the May 21 episode of Raw, Tensai dropped the "Lord" portion of his ring name and his Japanese outfit worn during his entrance. Following this, Tensai began losing much more frequently throughout the rest of 2012, beginning with John Cena ending his winning streak before he also suffered a loss to World Heavyweight Champion Sheamus. His losing streak caused Tensai to often vent his frustrations by abusing and attacking Sakamoto, who eventually ceased appearing with Tensai. On the June 29 episode of SmackDown, Tensai defeated Justin Gabriel to break his losing streak and also qualify for a spot in the World Heavyweight Championship Money in the Bank ladder match at Money in the Bank, though the match was ultimately won by Dolph Ziggler. Over the next three months, Tensai's losing streak resumed, as he lost to the likes of Tyson Kidd, Sin Cara, Randy Orton, and Ryback. Tensai finally ended his losing streak on the October 5 episode of SmackDown, defeating Big Show by disqualification after Sheamus interfered. However, he would be back on the losing end the following week, after being defeated by Sheamus. On November 18 at the Survivor Series pay-per-view, Tensai took part in a traditional Five-on-Five Elimination tag team match, but he was the second man eliminated from his team, but not before eliminating Brodus Clay. In December, Tensai was demoted to a comedy act, with Santino Marella calling him "Fat Albert" before proceeding to defeat Tensai.

==== Tons of Funk (2013–2014) ====
On the January 28, 2013, episode of Raw, Tensai was tricked into wearing lingerie while participating in a dance-off with Brodus Clay. Two days later on Main Event, after being mocked for his lingerie dance, Tensai defeated Titus O'Neil in a singles match. Clay came out to support Tensai during the match and Tensai danced with Clay after the match, signalling a face turn. Following this, Clay and Tensai formed a tag team and they went on to defeat established teams such as Primo and Epico, Heath Slater and Jinder Mahal of 3MB, and Team Rhodes Scholars (Cody Rhodes and Damien Sandow), with the latter match taking place during the pre-show of Elimination Chamber on February 17. On the March 22 episode of SmackDown, Tensai and Clay were defeated by Team Rhodes Scholars in a tag team match after an interference from their associates The Bella Twins. Tensai (also now referred to by the name Sweet T) and Clay announced their official tag-team name "Tons of Funk" on the March 27 episode of Main Event, where they accompanied The Funkadactyls (Cameron and Naomi) to the ring in a losing effort to The Bella Twins with Team Rhodes Scholars in their corner when Nikki pinned Naomi after an interference by Cody Rhodes.

The two teams were originally booked to face each other in an eight-person mixed tag team match on April 7 at WrestleMania 29, but their match was cut due to time constraints. The match instead took place the following night on Raw, where Tons of Funk and The Funkadactyls emerged victorious. After nearly a month of in-ring absence, Tons of Funk returned on the June 6 episode of Superstars, defeating Primo and Epico. On June 24, Tensai and Clay competed in a Triple Threat tag team match to determine the number one contenders for the Tag Team Championship against The Usos and 3MB (represented by Drew McIntyre and Jinder Mahal), although The Usos would ultimately win the match. In November 2013, Tons of Funk began to show signs of instability once Clay started a storyline where he became angry and jealous of the debuting Xavier Woods. As Clay began to exhibit more heel-oriented tendencies, such as repeatedly attacking Woods after he had defeated Woods in a match, Tensai and the Funkadactyls slowly became alienated from him. At TLC: Tables, Ladders & Chairs, Clay faced Woods' partner, R-Truth, and continually assaulted Truth instead of going for a win, resulting in Tensai and the Funkadactyls leaving in protest and Clay subsequently losing the match. On the December 20 episode of SmackDown, Tensai defeated Clay in a singles match after a distraction from Woods and the Funkadactyls.

==== Retirement and trainer (2014–present) ====
After Tons of Funk disbanded, Bloom was taken off television and, in January 2014, began working in WWE's developmental territory NXT as a commentator under the new ring name "Jason Albert". On August 7, Bloom stated he decided to retire from in-ring competition and announced that he would begin working as a trainer in the WWE Performance Center, resuming his teaching profession. On March 6, 2015, Bloom was reportedly promoted to interim NXT head trainer following the departure of Bill DeMott. On May 19, Bloom was promoted to NXT head coach from his previous interim role.

== Personal life ==
Bloom married Farah Louise on September 3, 2005.

At one point, Bloom had 28 body piercings, the first of which he received at the age of 14. His numerous tattoos represent his 8-year tenure in Japan.

Bloom is Jewish.

== Other media ==
Bloom has appeared in twenty video games under his various gimmicks, such as Prince Albert in WWF WrestleMania 2000, as Albert in WWF SmackDown!, WWF No Mercy, WWF SmackDown! 2: Know Your Role, WWF SmackDown! Just Bring It, WWF Raw, WWE WrestleMania X8, WWE SmackDown! Shut Your Mouth, as A-Train in WWE Raw 2, WWE SmackDown! Here Comes the Pain, WWE SmackDown! vs. Raw, as Giant Bernard in Fire Pro Wrestling 2, Fire Pro Wrestling Returns, Wrestle Kingdom and Wrestle Kingdom 2, as Willy Pearce in Wrestling Empire, and as Tensai in WWE '13 (as DLC) and in WWE 2K14. Bloom also appears as a trainer in MyCareer Mode in WWE 2K16, credited as Jason Albert, and WWE 2K17, WWE 2K18, and WWE 2K19 under his real name.

== Championships and accomplishments ==
- Impact Zone Wrestling
  - IZW Heavyweight Championship (1 time)
- Elite Xtreme Wrestling
  - EXW Tag Team Championship (1 time) (Note: After winning the championship, Bernard held the title by himself.)
- New Japan Pro-Wrestling
  - IWGP Tag Team Championship (2 times) – with Travis Tomko (1) and Karl Anderson (1)
  - G1 Tag League (2007) – with Travis Tomko
  - G1 Tag League (2009) – with Karl Anderson
  - New Japan Cup (2006)
- Nikkan Sports
  - Best Tag Team Award (2007) with Travis Tomko
  - Best Tag Team Award (2011) with Karl Anderson
- Power Pro Wrestling
  - PPW Heavyweight Championship (1 time)
  - PPW Young Guns Championship (1 time)
- Pro Wrestling Illustrated
  - Ranked No. 32 of the top 500 singles wrestlers in the PWI 500 in 2001
- Pro Wrestling Noah
  - GHC Tag Team Championship (1 time) – with Karl Anderson
- World Wrestling Federation
  - WWF Intercontinental Championship (1 time)
- Wrestling Observer Newsletter
  - Tag Team of the Year (2011) – with Karl Anderson

== See also ==
- List of Jewish professional wrestlers
