= WK2 =

WK2 or variant, may refer to:

File formats

- .wk2 file extension of Lotus 1-2-3

Products

- Scaled Composites White Knight Two
- Fourth Generation Jeep Grand Cherokee (WK2), 2011–present

Events

- Wrestle Kingdom 2 at January_4_Dome_Show#Wrestle_Kingdom_II_in_Tokyo_Dome
