= Wrestle Kingdom 2 =

2007 video game

- Developer: Yuke's
- Publisher: Yuke's
- Platform: PlayStation 2
- Release: JP: 10 May 2007
- Genre: Fighting
- Modes: Single-player, multiplayer

Wrestle Kingdom 2: Pro Wrestling Sekai Taisen (レッスルキングダム2 プロレスリング世界大戦, Ressuru Kingudamu 2 Puro Resuringu Sekaitaisen; lit. "Wrestle Kingdom 2: Pro-Wrestling World War") is a professional wrestling video game for the PlayStation 2. It is the sequel to Yuke's Wrestle Kingdom.

There are five different game modes: Champion Mode, Campaign Mode, Free Fight Mode, Tutorial Mode, and Edit Mode which provides a create-a-wrestler option. Wrestle Kingdom 2 features licensed wrestlers for New Japan Pro-Wrestling and All Japan Pro Wrestling, as well as a number of freelance workers and legends, but differs from the first installment by not including wrestlers from Pro Wrestling Noah.

== Gameplay ==
Wrestle Kingdom 2 features five separate modes for game play. Unlike the previous game, there is no drama mode nor anything that resembles a story or season mode.

=== Exhibition Matches ===
For instant action the player can select a variety of different matches. The types of matches include Single Match, Tag Match, Three Way Match, Handicap Match, Four Way Match, Five on Five Team Battle, and Gauntlet. The four preset match types are Normal, Hardcore, Shoot Rules, and MMA Rules. The match rules can be altered to make other types of matches, for instance turning off all match finishes but submission creates a submission match, but the match style does not vary. There are no cage matches or other similar matches that involve more alterations than just changing the rules of a normal match. By winning singles matches with certain wrestlers, video interviews are unlocked.

=== Tournaments ===
The players can select a wrestler and then compete in a tournament for a championship. Winning a championship with certain wrestlers unlocks hidden wrestlers. The championships available are the IWGP Heavyweight Championship at the G1 Climax, the IWGP Junior Heavyweight Championship at Best of the Super Juniors, the Triple Crown Heavyweight Championship at Champion Carnival, and the World Junior Heavyweight Championship at the Super J-Cup.

=== Campaign Mode ===
In this mode the player must select a specific wrestling event and then prepare a stable of wrestlers to compete against the computer. At the events matches are put together and then wagers are made for power-ups and unlockables such as wrestlers, moves, and items. The type of match is determined based on the event selected. There are a large number of locations and events in this mode and more appear as the player progresses.

=== Extras ===
Wrestle Kingdom 2 features a variety of extra material. The bios include character stats, championship history, and in some cases digital autographs. The interviews available are with Gedo, Genichiro Tenryu, Hiroshi Tanahashi, Jado, Jyushin Thunder Liger, Kaz Hayashi, Keiji Mutoh, Kensuke Sasaki, Koji Kanemoto, Manabu Nakanishi, Masahiro Chono, Minoru, Satoshi Kojima, Shinsuke Nakamura, Taiyō Kea, Tatsumi Fujinami, Tiger Mask, Toshiaki Kawada, Wataru Inoue, Yoshihiro Takayama, and Yuji Nagata.

== Roster ==
=== New Japan Pro-Wrestling ===
- Masahiro Chono
- Shinsuke Nakamura
- Hiroshi Tanahashi
- Hiroyoshi Tenzan
- Yuji Nagata
- Manabu Nakanishi
- Jyushin Thunder Liger
- Tiger Mask
- Koji Kanemoto
- Minoru Tanaka
- Jado
- Gedo
- Giant Bernard
- Wataru Inoue
- Riki Choshu
- Ryusuke Taguchi
- Naofumi Yamamoto

=== All Japan Pro Wrestling ===
- Keiji Mutoh
- Great Muta
- Kaz Hayashi
- Satoshi Kojima
- Taiyo Kea
- Taka Michinoku
- Nosawa Rongai
- Taru
- Shuji Kondo
- Brother Yasshi
- Masanobu Fuchi
- Suwama

=== Legends ===
- Antonio Inoki
- Abdullah The Butcher
- Shinya Hashimoto
- Tiger Mask (Original)
- Terry Funk
- Dory Funk Jr.
- Jumbo Tsuruta
- Stan Hansen
- Tiger Jeet Singh
- The Sheik
- Masakatsu Funaki
- Atsushi Onita
- Akira Maeda
- The Destroyer
- Dick Murdoch
- "Dr. Death" Steve Williams
- Terry Gordy
- Big Van Vader

=== Freelance ===
- Kensuke Sasaki
- Yoshihiro Takayama
- Toshiaki Kawada
- Tajiri
- Hayabusa (wrestler)
- Tatsumi Fujinami
- Akebono
- Katsuhiko Nakajima
- Osamu Nishimura
- Kazunari Murakami
- Milano Collection A.T.
- Yoshiaki Fujiwara
- Genichiro Tenryu

=== EX ===
- Antonio Inoki (Young) (Hidden)
- Keiji Mutoh (Young) (Hidden)
- Great Muta (Young) (Hidden)
- Great Muta (Hidden)
- Masahiro Chono (Young) (Hidden)
- Masahiro Chono (20 YEARS Anniversary) (Hidden)
- Jyushin Thunder Liger (Young) (Hidden)
- Shinsuke Nakamura (Young) (Hidden)
- Masked Devilock (Hidden)
- Akira Hokuto

== Reception ==
A Den of Geek review of "20 Underrated Wrestling Games" in 2021 ranked Wrestle Kingdom 2 in fourth place, calling it "'arcadey' and accessible in all of the right places without sacrificing depth", with "some brilliant tournament modes along with an impressive collection of Japanese stars".

Similarly, a 2022 review in Screen Rant called it "one of the best wrestling titles ever". In addition to the prominent Japanese pro wrestling stars from the period, the review commended its graphics as "genuinely gorgeous" and its game play as "allowing for some creativity with the rules including a shoot and MMA-style setup", with "a notable campaign mode and some excellent tournament templates".

== See also ==
- Wrestle Kingdom
