= Tapper =

Tapper may refer to:

== Games ==
- Tapper (video game), a 1983 arcade game released by Bally Midway
- Tapper World Tour, a reincarnation of the arcade game for iOS
- Tapper (card game), a card game of the Austrian tarot family

== Botany ==
- Spile, for tapping trees
- Toddy tapper, one who cultivates palm wine

== People ==
- Tapper (surname)
- Tapper Zukie (born 1955), Jamaican record producer
- Richard Tapper Cadbury (1768–1860), English abolitionist

== See also ==
- Cholmondeley-Tapper
- Taper (disambiguation)
- Tap (disambiguation)
- Trapper (disambiguation)
