= Prince Albert (genital piercing) =

Genital piercing

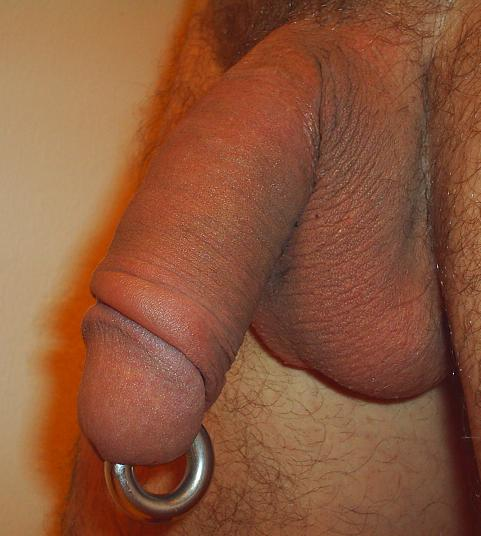
- A penis with a 8mm Prince Albert piercing
- Nicknames: PA
- Location: Urethra
- Jewelry: Circular or curved barbell, captive bead ring, Prince's wand, segment ring
- Healing: 4 weeks to 6 months

The Prince Albert (PA) is a penis piercing which extends from the urethra to the underside of the glans. It is one of the most common male genital piercings. The related reverse Prince Albert piercing enters through the urethra and exits through a hole pierced in the top of the glans.

The piercing can be centred if the bearer is circumcised. Otherwise, the piercing must be done off-centre so that the surrounding skin can reposition itself.

== Healing and potential side effects ==
The Prince Albert healing time can take from 4 weeks to 6 months. A fresh PA piercing may cause bleeding, swelling and inflammation. In rare cases, it can lead to local infections. Some men find that the dribble caused by the PA when urinating necessitates sitting down to urinate.

Some PA wearers report it enhances sexual pleasure for both partners. PA rings can cause additional discomfort to female partners in cases when the penis comes into contact with the cervix. Sexual partners of those with piercings may experience complications during oral sex such as chipped teeth, choking, foreign bodies getting stuck between the partner's teeth, and mucosal injury to receptive partners.

Very large gauge or heavy jewelry can cause thinning of the tissue between the urethral opening and the healed fistula, resulting in accidental tearing or other complications with sexual experiences. Conversely, extremely thin jewelry can cause the same tearing in what is commonly referred to as the "cheese cutter effect", either during sudden torsion or over a long period of wearing, especially if the thin jewelry bears any weight.

== Jewelry ==
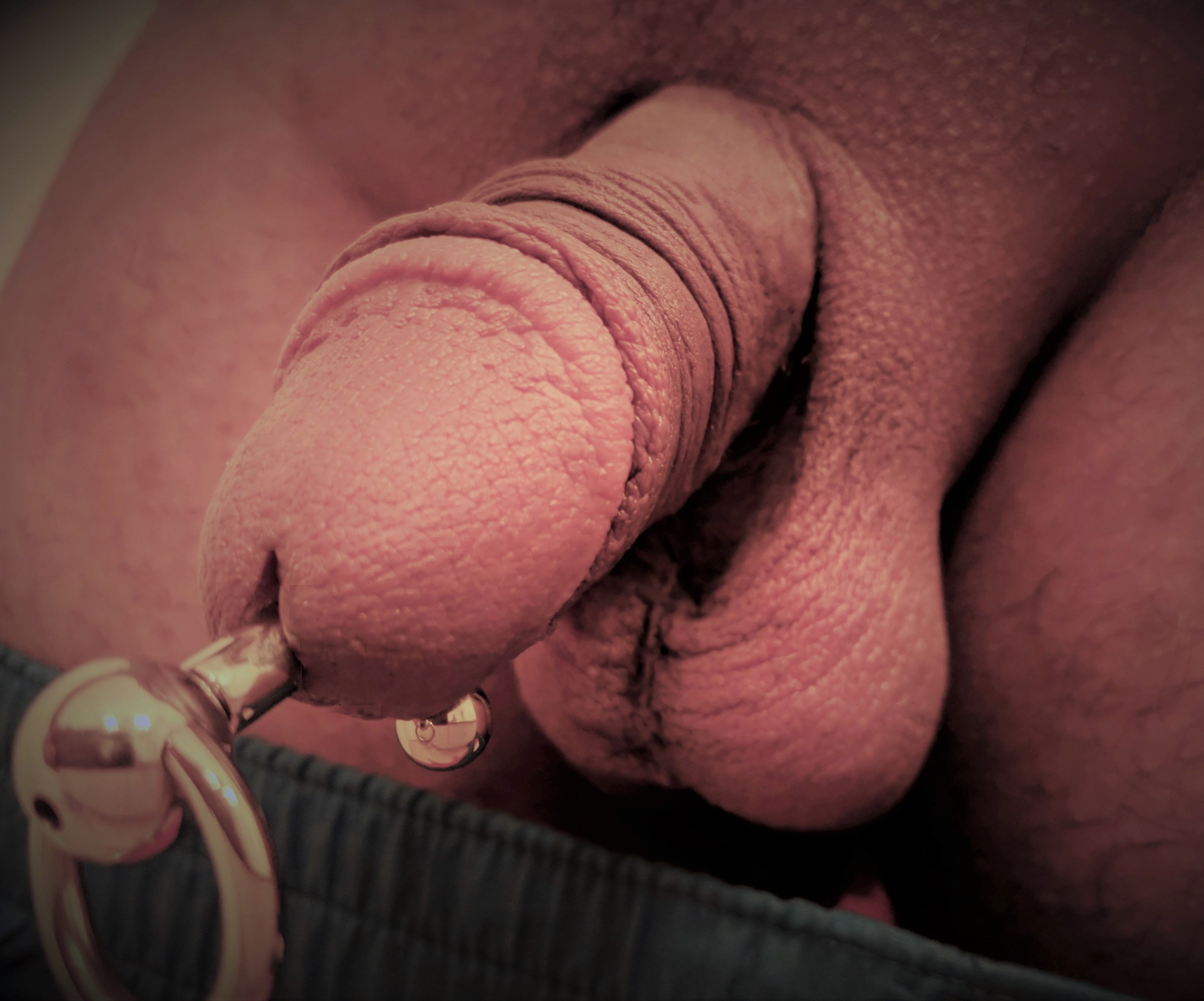
A piercing with prince's wand jewelry

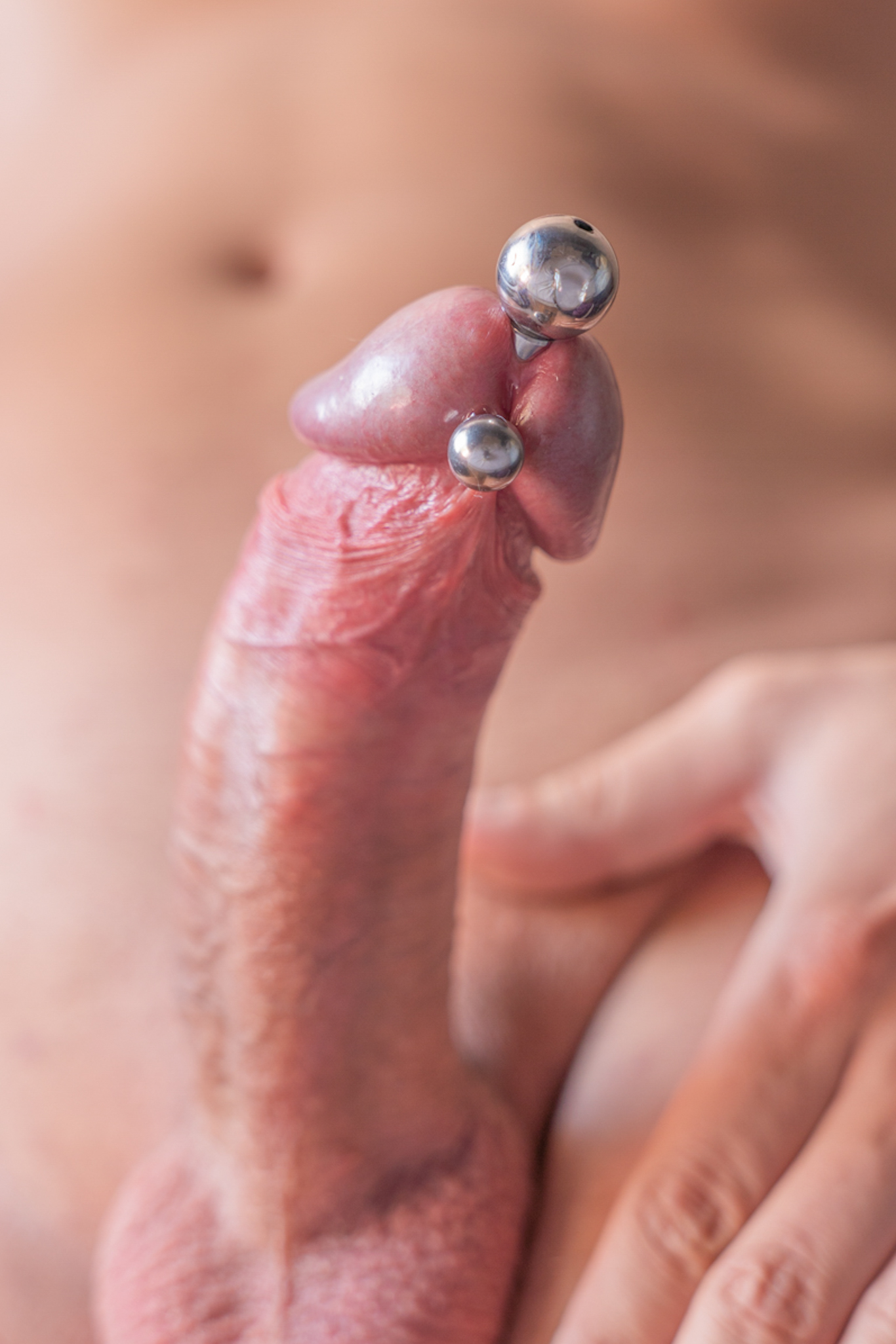
Another piercing with prince's wand jewelry

Prince Albert piercings are typically pierced at either 12 or 10g (2 or 2.5mm) or up to 5mm (4g) or a safe maximum of 6mm (2g). They are often (gradually) stretched soon after, with jewelry within the 8g to 00g (3mm to 10mm) range being the most popular. One of the reasons not to perform the initial piercing at a small diameter (16g or 14g) or otherwise to immediately stretch it to 10g or 8g using a taper is to prevent the 'cheese-cutter effect', although personal preference and individual anatomy also play a role in these decisions.

Further stretching to sizes 0 or 00g (8 or 10mm) and larger is not fairly common. This may be due to a lack of jewellery options in the 1g (7mm) size, leaving a large jump between 2g (6mm) and 0g (8mm). If a sufficiently heavy barbell or ring is worn continuously, a mild form of 'auto-stretching' can be observed.

== History and culture ==
The origin of this piercing is unknown. Genital piercings appeared in the Kama Sutra as a way of enhancing sexual pleasure.

In modern times, the Prince Albert piercing was popularized by Jim Ward in the early 1970s, and Doug Malloy published a pamphlet in which he concocted fanciful histories of genital piercings in particular. These apocryphal tales—which included the notion that Albert, the Prince Consort of Great Britain invented the piercing that shares his name in order to tame the appearance of his large penis in tight trousers—are widely circulated as urban legend. No historical proof of their veracity has been located independent of Malloy's assertions.

Like many other male genital piercings, it had a history of practice in gay male subculture in the twentieth century. It became more prominently known when body piercing expanded in the late 1970s and was gradually embraced by popular culture.

== See also ==
- Princess Albertina piercing

== Sources ==
- Porterfield, Amanda (2003). Gary Laderman; Luis D. Leon (eds.). Religion and American Cultures: an Encyclopedia of Traditions, Diversity, and Popular Expressions. Vol. 2. ABC-CLIO. ISBN 1-57607-238-X.
