= Prince's wand =

Male genital piercing

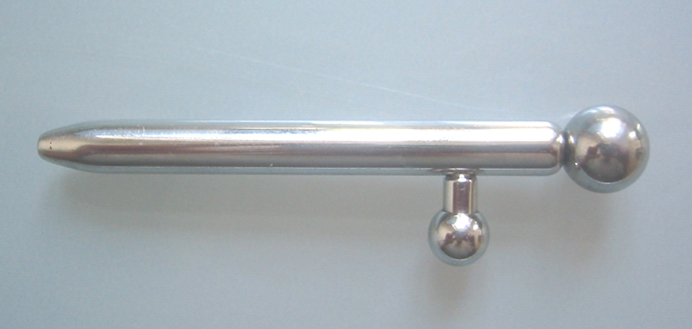
Prince's wand

The prince's wand (also known as a penis plug) is a piece of body piercing jewelry. It consists of a hollow tube with a threaded cap at the end. The tube is inserted into the urethra, and a stem is inserted through a Prince Albert piercing and into another threaded hole on the side of the tube.

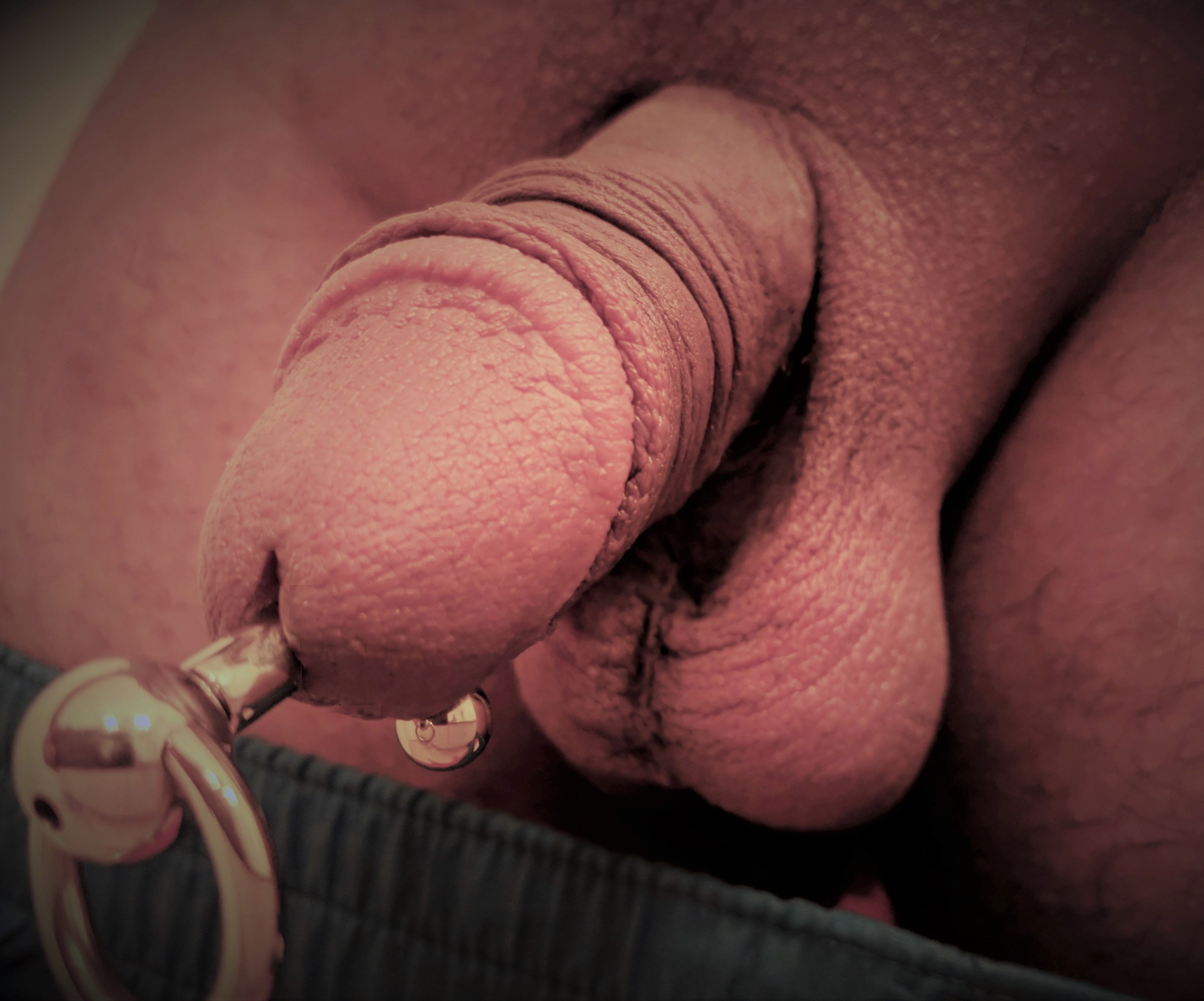
An example of an uncircumcised penis wearing a large "door-knocker" prince's wand
