= Rivalry and Tribute =

Book by Bruce Elliot Tapper

Rivalry and Tribute: Society and Ritual in a Telugu Village in South India
- Author: Bruce Elliot Tapper
- Language: English
- Genre: Studies in Sociology and Social Anthropology
- Published: 1988 (South Asia Books)
- Pages: 309
- ISBN: 978-81-7075-003-1
- OCLC: 18363587
- Dewey Decimal: 306/.0954/84 20
- LC Class: HN690.V55 T36 1987

Rivalry and Tribute is a book written by Bruce Elliot Tapper that offers a peek into a 1970s village society in India.

This book is a study of the interplay between society and ritual, set in a village in Andhra Pradesh in south India. Tapper considers the dynamics of competition—between people and between groups—and explains the significance of Hinduism in their lives. In particular it focuses on Gavara farmers in the sugarcane growing belt of Visakhapatnam district in the context of historical and contemporary shifts in wealth and power.

The book presents case studies and statistical data on such issues as landholding, loan-giving, wealth, divorce, dispute settlement, leadership, and inter-caste economic relations. It examines rivalries between brothers, tensions in the relationship between husbands and wives, inequalities between caste members, and competitive aspects of settlement growth. It documents controversies over the conduct of festivals, which arose from such rivalries. Above all, it defines the essential principles of social organization- hierarchy (of age, sex and caste) and mutual obligations (among kinsmen and between caste groups)

This book describes beliefs—including those about obligations toward deities, ideologies about the character of women, and ideas about female deities, astrology, and evil eye—explaining them in terms of their social significance. It highlights the importance of puja—a basic form of Hindu worship—which it interprets as a symbolic payment of tribute, expressing a moral code that links the acceptance of hierarchy and social obligations with the maintenance of health and well-being.

The full range of rituals—life cycle, seasonal, and agricultural—are examined in detail, with discussion of the ways they define and reaffirm the basic structures of society despite rivaling and competitive tendencies.
