= Professional wrestling championship =

In professional wrestling, a Championship or Title is a recognition promoted by professional wrestling organizations. Championship reigns are determined by professional wrestling matches, in which competitors are involved in predetermined rivalries; these narratives create feuds between the various competitors, which usually cast them as either faces (heroes), heels (villains), or more rarely tweeners (morally ambiguous). The bookers in a company, who decide the winners and where the storyline goes, will place the title on the most accomplished performer or the one they believe will generate fan interest in terms of event attendance and television viewership.

== History ==
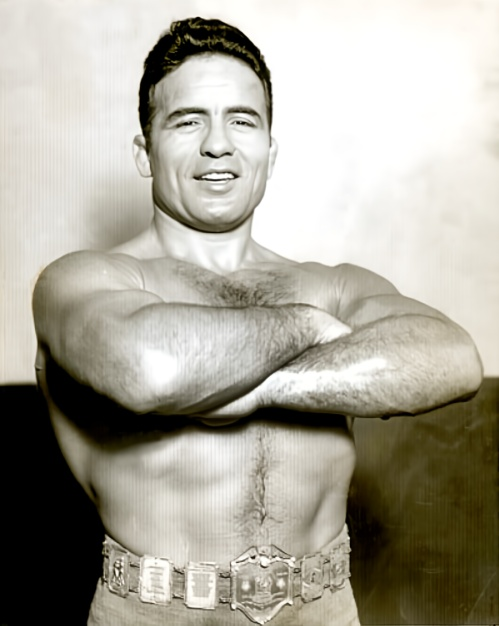
Jim Londos had the longest reign with the original World Heavyweight Wrestling Championship

Professional wrestling portrays the structure of title match combat sports. Participants compete for a championship, and must defend it after winning it. These titles are represented physically by a championship belt that is worn or carried by the champion(s). In the case of team wrestling, there is a belt for each member of the team.

Almost all professional wrestling promotions have one major title, and some have more. Championships are designated by divisions of weight, height, gender, wrestling style, and other qualifications.

Typically, each promotion only recognizes the "legitimacy" of their own titles, although cross-promotion does happen. When one promotion absorbs or purchases another, the titles from the defunct promotion may continue to be defended in the new promotion or be decommissioned, usually through championship unification.

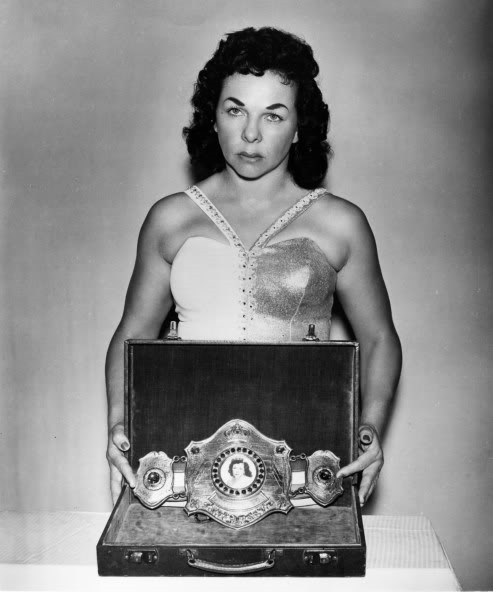
Four-times NWA World Women's Championship The Fabulous Moolah whose combined regime of that title stands at 9,925 days, that is approximately 28 years

Behind the scenes, the bookers in a company will place the title on the most accomplished performer, or those the bookers believe will generate fan interest in terms of event attendance and television viewership. Lower ranked titles may also be used on the performers who show potential, thus allowing them greater exposure to the audience. However, other circumstances may also determine the use of a championship. A combination of a championship's lineage, the caliber of performers as champion, and the frequency and manner of title changes, dictates the audience's perception of the title's quality, significance, and reputation.

A wrestler's championship accomplishments can be central to their career, becoming a measure of their performance ability and drawing power. The most accomplished or decorated wrestlers tend to be revered as legends. American wrestler Ric Flair has had multiple world heavyweight championship reigns spanning over three decades. Japanese wrestler Último Dragón once held and defended a record 10 titles simultaneously.

== Championship belt styles ==
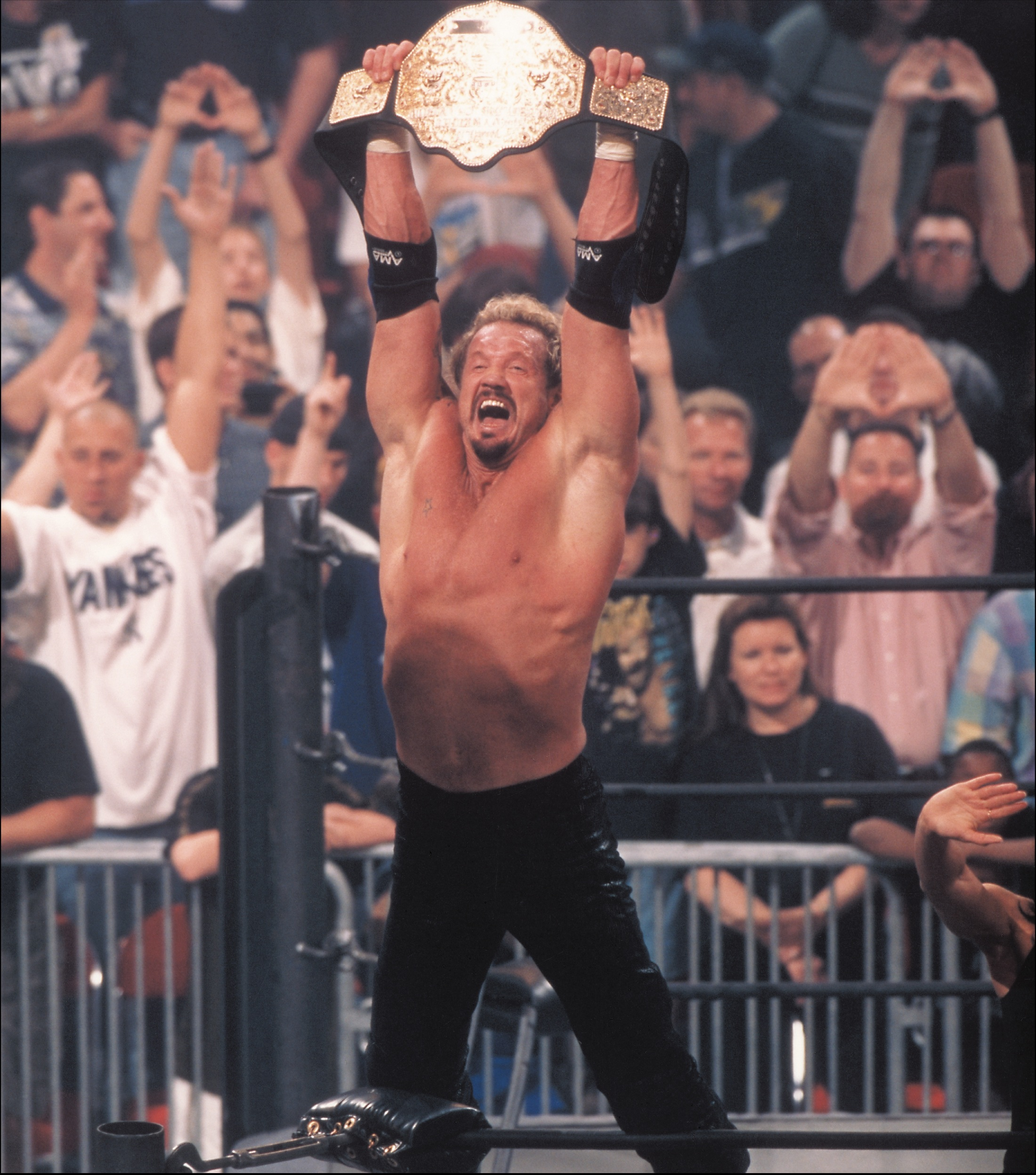
Diamond Dallas Page as WCW World Heavyweight Champion. The title is represented by the Big Gold Belt, which represented six different championships.

Professional wrestling's championship belts are modeled similarly to the championship belts in boxing, and other combat sports such as mixed martial arts. They are made of elaborately designed plates of gold or other precious metals, usually bearing the name of the title and the wrestling promotion, and is on a leather strap. The color and designs vary with each title and promotion.

A wrestler may win a sanctioned championship and redesign the belt itself. Some (such as John Cena's Spinner Belt) later became the official belt design. Others (such as Stone Cold Steve Austin's Smoking Skull Belt, Edge's Rated-R Spinner, Daniel Bryan's eco-friendly belt, and The Fiend Bray Wyatt's Universal title with his face on it) were not used after their respective title reign.

While rare, there are cases of championships being represented with items other than belts, such as championship trophies, medals, crowns, etc. An example of this is WWE's NXT Heritage Cup, which is represented with a trophy.

== Injured champions ==
The fate of a title depends on the champion's condition and the importance of the title to the promotion (e.g. Gregory Helms held the WWE Cruiserweight Championship, despite being sidelined with an injury, because the Cruiserweight Championship was not a major championship). The champion may be forced to vacate his or her title if the injury becomes too severe and the championship is too important. In May 2015, Daniel Bryan vacated the WWE Intercontinental Championship due to a major concussion and a year before, he had to vacate the world title due to neck surgery. In November 2015, Seth Rollins vacated the WWE World Heavyweight Championship due to a knee injury that required surgery.

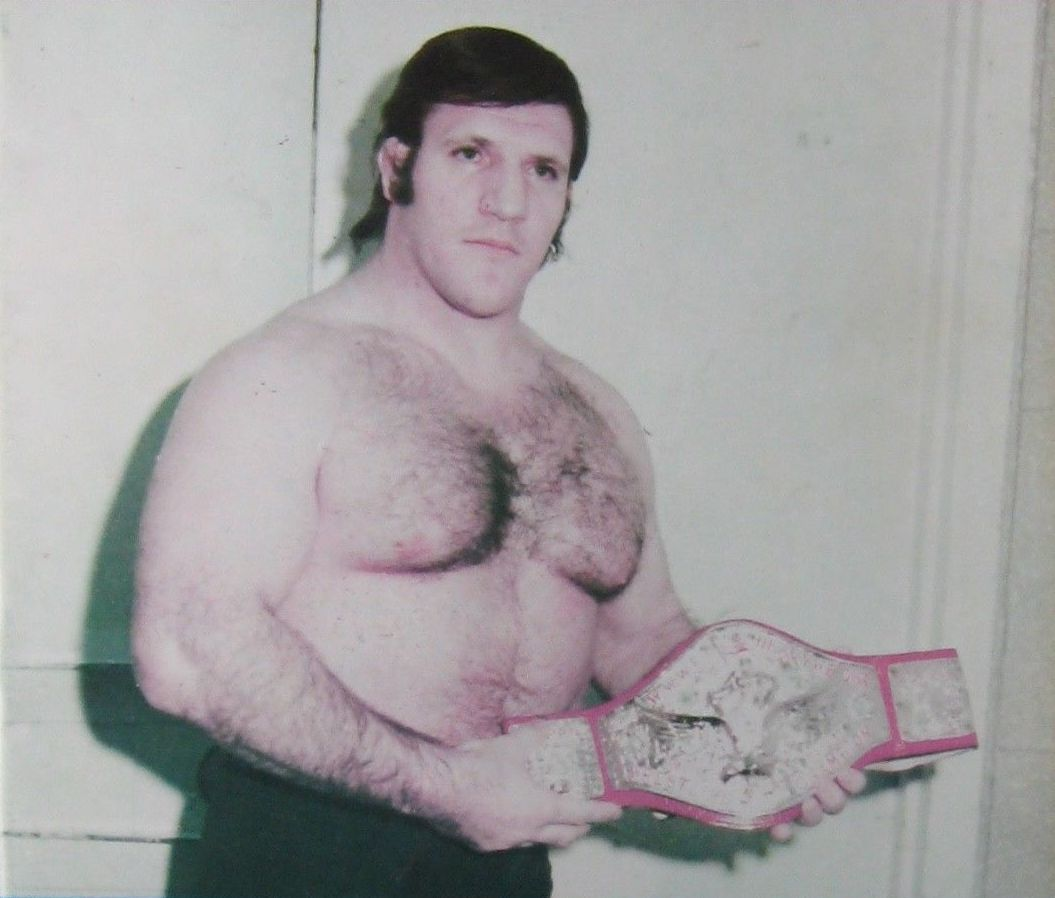
Bruno Sammartino, the longest reigning WWWF World Heavyweight Champion, was able to keep his championship while inactive for part of 1976

However, a champion may keep their title despite a severe injury and despite the championship being quite important. In 1998, Shane Douglas kept the ECW World Heavyweight Championship while sidelined. In 2005, Trish Stratus kept the WWE Women's Championship while sidelined with a herniated disk for four months. In 2012, CM Punk kept the WWE Championship while undergoing and recovering from knee surgery. In 2015, Ryback kept the WWE Intercontinental Championship while recovering from a knee infection.

In All Elite Wrestling, when a champion gets injured, a match is held to determine an interim champion until the lineal champion is cleared to compete, after which a match is held between the two to crown an undisputed champion. For example, Jon Moxley became interim AEW World Champion in June 2022 after then-lineal champion, CM Punk, was sidelined with a foot injury. When Punk returned in August, Moxley defeated him in a match to become the undisputed champion. These interim reigns are not recognized as official reigns. However, if the lineal champion's injury renders them indefinitely sidelined, they can forfeit the championship and the interim champion becomes the lineal champion. An example of this happened in November 2022, when it was announced that then-lineal AEW Women's World Champion, Thunder Rosa relinquished the title due to a back injury she suffered in August. As a result, then-interim champion, Jamie Hayter, became the official champion.

Before the 1980s when title matches were rare, some champions could keep their titles even when injured; Bruno Sammartino kept his WWWF World Heavyweight Championship from April to June 1976 despite being injured by a botched body slam from Stan Hansen. In Mexico, this situation still occurs, but in Japan, it is becoming increasingly rare as champions are needed to be present in regular tours even when titles are not defended.

== Classifications ==
Professional wrestling championships are often split up into various different classifications, each of which designate varying levels of importance to the belts.

=== World championships ===
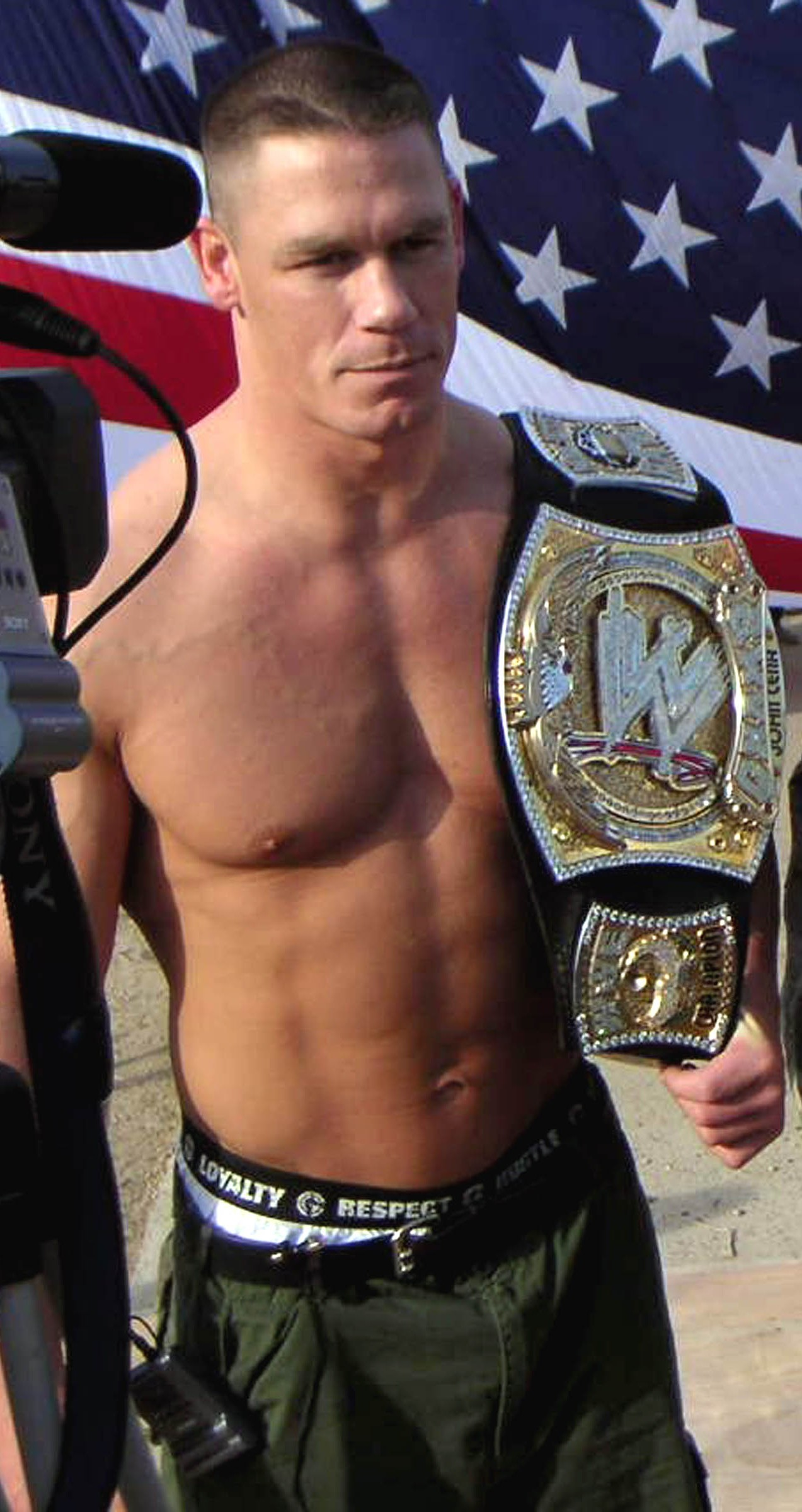
Record 14-time WWE Champion John Cena. With his three reigns as World Heavyweight Champion, Cena is recognized by WWE for the most world title reigns at 17.

The world heavyweight championship (also just world championship, heavyweight championship, or in some cases the name of the promotion followed by championship) is the name given to the championship that is typically presented as being the most prestigious of those contested within a promotion. The wrestler holding a championship with this name is most commonly referred to as the "world heavyweight champion" or "world champion" (though some promotions may use synonymous/alternate terms, such as the AAA Mega Championship of Lucha Libre AAA World Wide or the Undisputed WWE Championship, the premier title of WWE).

Since professional wrestling is scripted, there is no promotion or group of people that recognize one official world title of the industry (the closest was the NWA Worlds Heavyweight Championship during the territory days during the mid to late 20th century).

Instead, each promotion can promote their top title as a world title, with some of them promoting title matches around the world to claim the designation. Some promotions may even recognize multiple world championships, such as is the case with WWE, as due to the large size of its roster, the promotion splits its roster into what they call brands where talent exclusively perform and their two main brands (Raw and SmackDown) each have their own world championship.

The first widely recognized world heavyweight championship was the World Heavyweight Wrestling Championship, created in 1905, and the inaugural champion was George Hackenschmidt. The lineage of many prominent contemporary world championships can be traced back to the World Heavyweight Wrestling Championship, with the NWA Worlds Heavyweight Championship considered its direct successor, with many world championships having been spun off from the NWA's title.

=== Location-specific championships ===
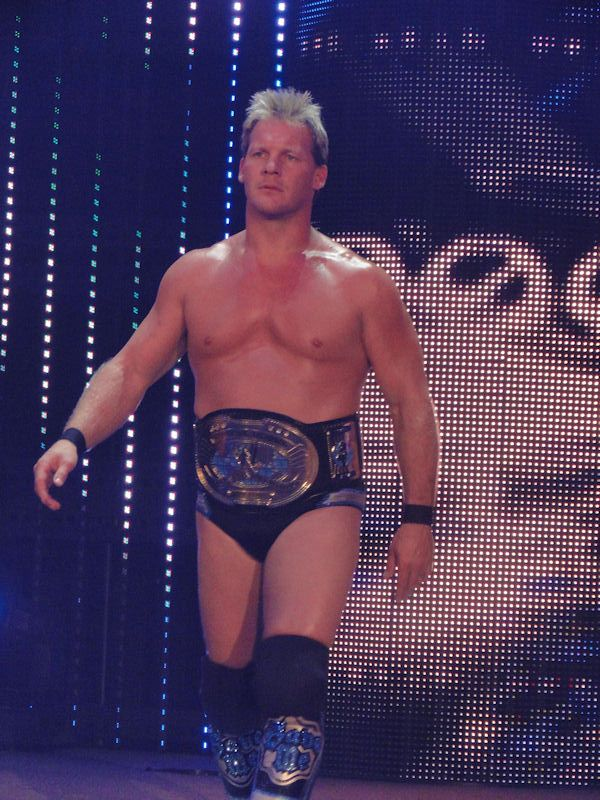
Chris Jericho as the WWE Intercontinental Champion. Overall, he is a record 10-time intercontinental champion between WWE and NJPW.

A very common championship variation. The championship usually specifies the location on where the promotion is based, an example being WWE's WWE United States Championship. Sometimes it may specify a specific state or territory, such as the NWA Georgia Heavyweight Championship. It is also common to be a smaller division of the world, an example being the WWE Intercontinental Championship, the TNA International Championship, or the IWGP Global Heavyweight Championship. It is very common for these variations to be the second most prestigious championship in a promotion, but exceptions have existed, like the now defunct WWE European Championship, which served as the company's tertiary singles championship, and the NWA United States Heavyweight Championship, which many NWA territories created versions of and promoted as their most prestigious championship whenever the NWA World Heavyweight Champion was not around.

=== Weight class championships ===
Another common classification of championships are by weight classes. Given the scripted nature of professional wrestling matches, weight classes are not always strictly adhered to. Typically, promotions prefer to have a heavyweight title as their top prize, with other designations, such as cruiserweight, middleweight, or light-heavyweight titles. Promotions often have one sub-heavyweight classification, while others sometimes may have more. Mountevans' committee (a governing body that instilled rules for professional wrestling in the UK) created seven formal weight divisions:

- Lightweight (154 pounds (70 kg))
- Welterweight (165 pounds (75 kg))
- Middleweight (176 pounds (80 kg))
- Heavy middleweight (187 pounds (85 kg))
- Light heavyweight (198 pounds (90 kg))
- Mid-heavyweight (209 pounds (95 kg))
- Heavyweight (above 220 pounds (100 kg))

Classifying championships into weight classes is also common practice in the lucha libre promotions of Mexico. Lucha libre has a detailed weight class system patterned after boxing. Each weight class has an official upper limit, but examples of wrestlers who are technically too heavy to hold their title can be found. The following weight classes exist in lucha libre, as defined by the "Comisión de Box y Lucha Libre Mexico D.F." (the Mexico City Boxing and Wrestling Commission), the main regulatory body in Mexico:

- Flyweight (115 pounds (52 kg))
- Bantamweight (126 pounds (57 kg))
- Featherweight (139 pounds (63 kg))
- Lightweight (150 pounds (68 kg))
- Super Lightweight (161 pounds (73 kg))
- Welterweight (170 pounds (77 kg))
- Super Welterweight (181 pounds (82 kg))
- Middleweight (192 pounds (87 kg))
- Super Middleweight/Junior Light Heavyweight (203 pounds (92 kg))
- Light Heavyweight (214 pounds (97 kg))
- Junior Heavyweight/Cruiserweight (231 pounds (105 kg))
- Heavyweight (231 pounds (105 kg)) (Minimum)

=== Gender championships ===
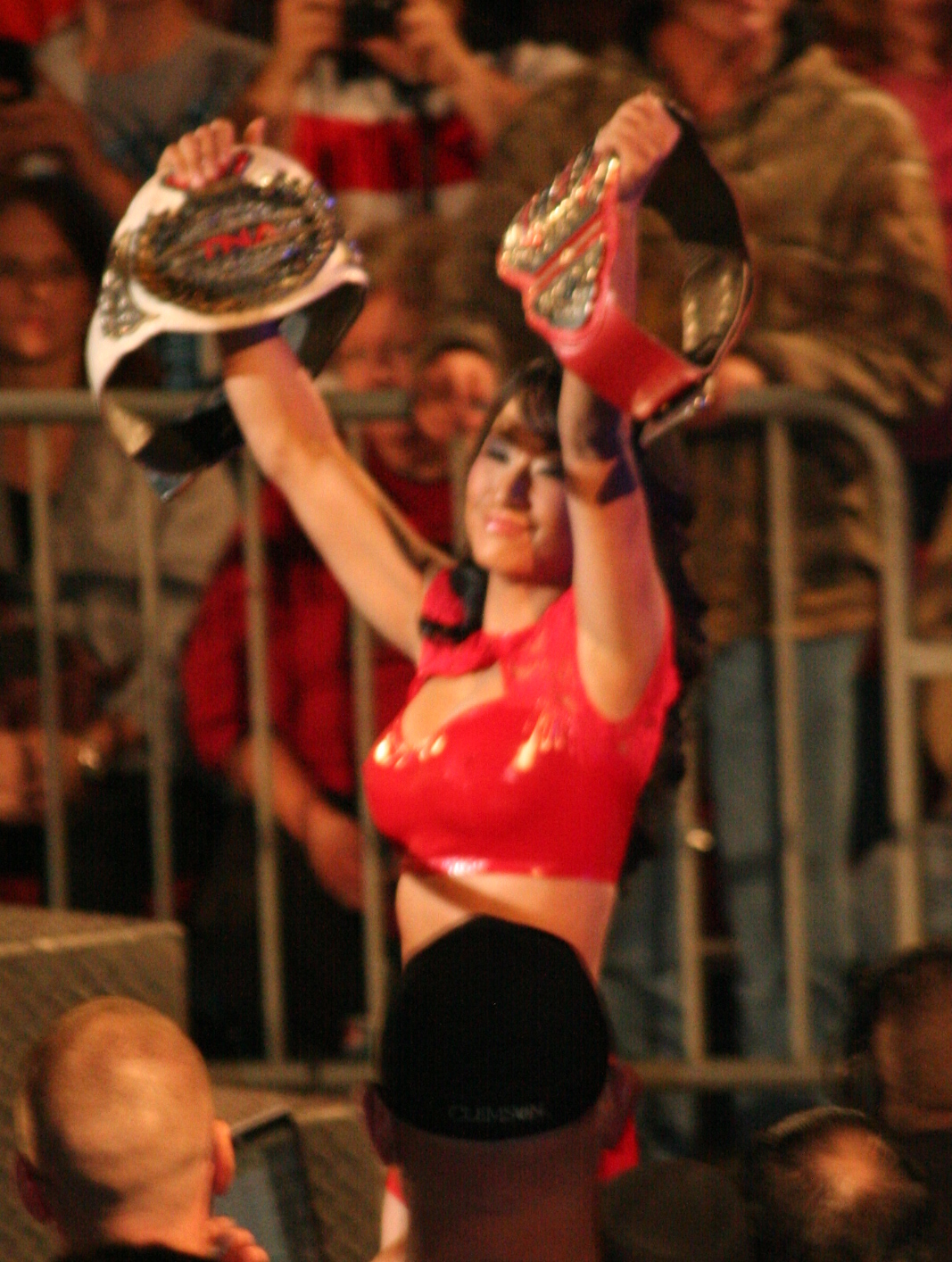
Gail Kim, a seven-time TNA Knockouts Champion (right hand), held the TNA Knockouts Tag Team Championship simultaneously

Gender occasionally plays a role in the classifications of championship belts. Due to professional wrestling being a male dominated sport, only women's titles are given official gender classifications. Generally, only men are allowed to win the championships without a gender specification, though Chyna defeating Jeff Jarrett to win the WWF Intercontinental Championship in 1999 and Tessa Blanchard defeating Sami Callihan to win the Impact World Championship in 2020 are notable exceptions. In promotions featuring only a single gender (such as Women of Wrestling or Shimmer Women Athletes), gender classifications are often unnecessary as well. Titles specifically designated for women may fall into any of the other categories listed here (e.g., women's world titles or women's tag team titles, putting them on an equal level as their male counterpart).

Andy Kaufman once used gender classifications to his advantage, turning inter-gender competitions into a unique wrestling side-show. Kaufman declared himself the "Inter-Gender Champion of the World", and offered $1,000 to any woman who could pin him. None were successful during the run of the gimmick; though in other promotions such as WCW and WWE, women have successfully pinned men, most notably in a few isolated championship matches.

On rare occasions, a male wrestler will compete in championship matches for championships generally contested exclusively in the women's division. Such examples include Harvey Wippleman becoming the only male to capture the WWF Women's Championship in 2000, and Eric Young winning one half of the TNA Knockouts Tag Team Championship in 2012.

=== Gimmick/style championships ===
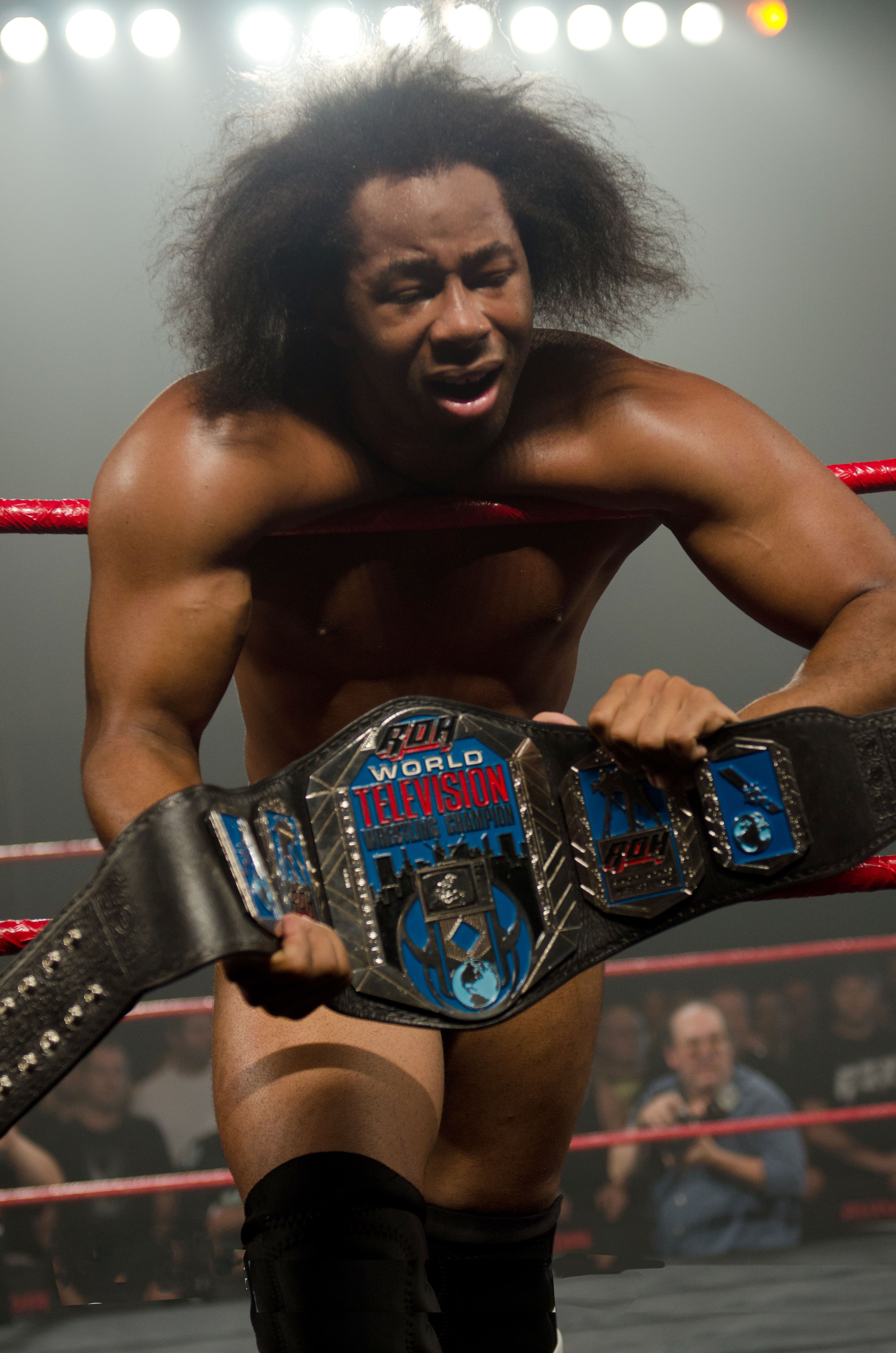
Jay Lethal, two-time ROH World Television Champion

Gimmick match classifications sometimes factor into the creation of title belts. In these classifications, special skills in a certain type of match or a certain style of wrestling is the signature of the division, and the champion is considered to be the most skilled wrestler at that specific style.

Gimmick championships often take very differing forms. A common variation is the "hardcore championship", a title often defended in weapons-filled and bloody competitions with fewer rules (count outs and disqualifications are not usually allowed). A recent example of a hardcore championship is the FTW Championship, which was used in All Elite Wrestling (AEW) from 2020 to 2024 and was primarily contested in FTW Rules matches. Another past such title was the WWE Hardcore Championship, which was active from 1998 to 2002.

In recent years, style-based championships have centered around what is known as "scientific" or technical wrestling. Examples of this include the NXT Heritage Cup (which is specifically contested under "British Round Rules") in WWE's NXT brand, and the ROH Pure Championship in Ring of Honor (which is contested under "Pure Wrestling Rules").

A variation that was prominent in the 1980s and 1990s and made a return in the 2020s is a "television championship" or "iron man championship", which involves more frequent title defenses as well as the stipulations that the belt can only change hands on television (as opposed to non-televised house shows) with title matches having a short, TV-friendly time limit, usually 10 or 15 minutes. These titles were originally introduced during a time when weekly TV shows were seen as a vehicle to promote the money-making live shows, where major title defenses took place. Television titles provided a championship that would be defended on the weekly television shows. Examples of a television championship include the AEW TNT Championship (named after the home network of AEW's Collision plus other AEW programming) and the ROH World Television Championship. In 2021, AEW introduced the first TV title specifically for female wrestlers, the AEW TBS Championship, named for the network that is the home of Dynamite as of January 5, 2022, serving as the counterpart to the male TNT Championship. Sister promotion ROH introduced a similar title for their women's division, the ROH Women's World Television Championship.

A modern take on the traditional TV title are internet championships. As professional wrestling began having events on streaming and online platforms, some promotions modified their television championships to be promoted as internet championships to reflect this. Examples of this include the TNA Digital Media Championship, which was created in 2021 and defended up to 2025, where the full match are free to watch on to TNA's online platforms and YouTube. In 2024, WWE introduced the Speed Championship for the men and women division. The title was doubly named after the Twitter exclusive streaming show WWE Speed and due to the five-minute time limit of title matches (non-title Speed matches have a three-minute time limit). In August 2025, the titles were moved to NXT and were no longer defended on WWE Speed; in 2026 the titles were retired.

=== Tag team championships ===
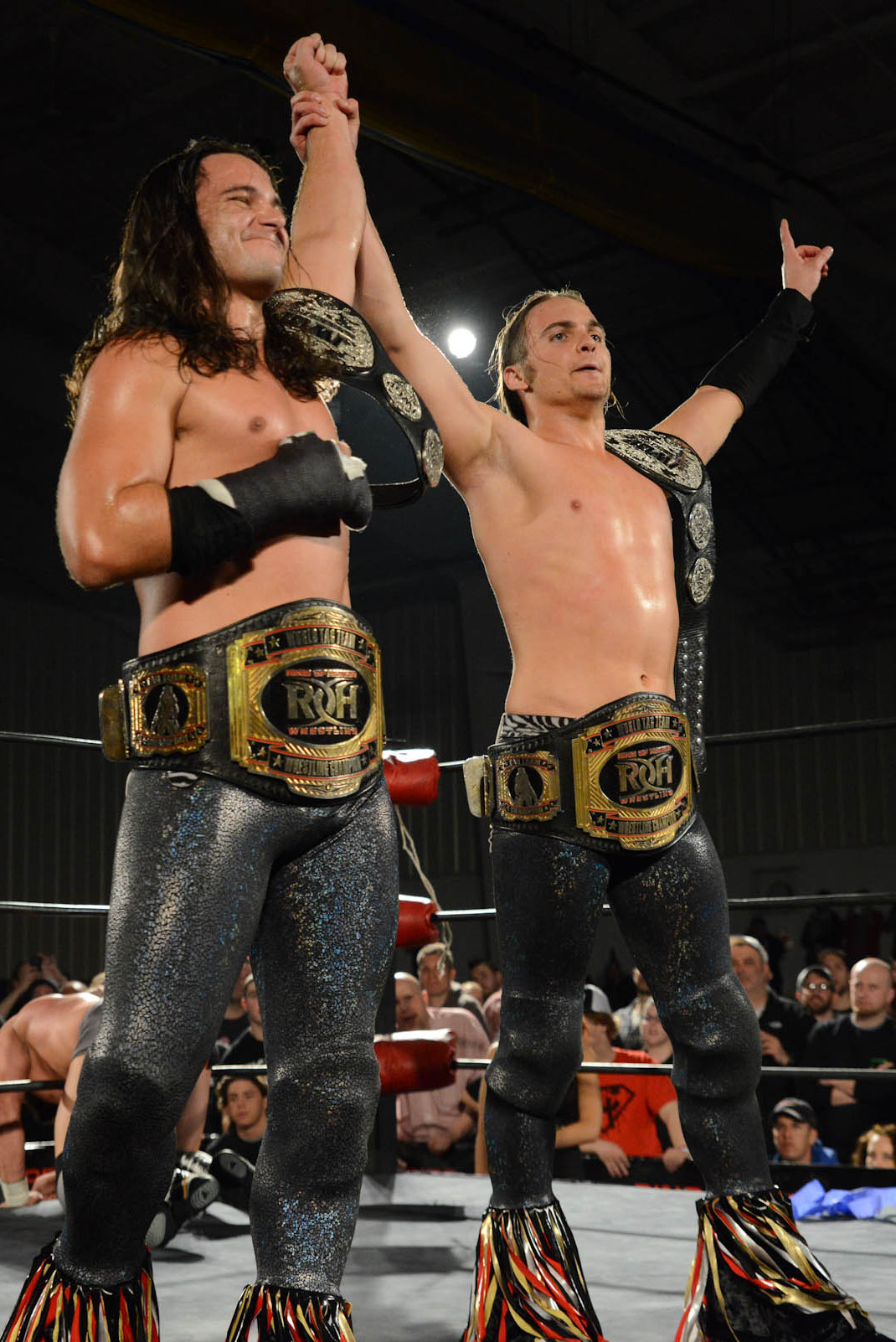
The Young Bucks as both the IWGP Junior Heavyweight Tag Team and ROH World Tag Team Champions

Tag team championships are yet another different form of wrestling titles. Some consider it to be a style championship, but tag team championships are unique in their ability to include multiple wrestlers on teams competing for multiple belts. The most common form of tag team championships are in 2-on-2 format, which is often implicitly understood. Other tag team championships include 3-on-3 and 4-on-4 formats, which are often explicitly stated within the championship name to distinguish them from the 2-on-2 championships. Some teams may invoke what is called the Freebird Rule, in which a stable of three or more wrestlers are all officially recognized as champion, allowing any pairing of the stable's members to defend the championship. This rule is most commonly applied to the standard 2-on-2 tag team championship, though it has also been applied to the other variants.

Tag team championships are also often combined with regional modifiers, gimmick modifiers, gender modifiers, and weight class modifiers to further distinguish them. In such cases, the primary title is usually called the world tag team championship, with the other championships seen as secondary titles.

Examples of 2-on-2 tag team championships:

- WWE Tag Team Championship
- TNA World Tag Team Championship
- IWGP Tag Team Championship

Examples of 3-on-3 tag team championships:

- CMLL World Trios Championship
- ROH World Six-Man Tag Team Championship
- AEW World Trios Championship

Examples of 4-on-4 tag team championships:

- FMW World Street Fight 8-Man Tag Team Championship

Examples of 5-on-5 tag team championships:

- KO-D 10-Man Tag Team Championship

=== Unsanctioned championships ===
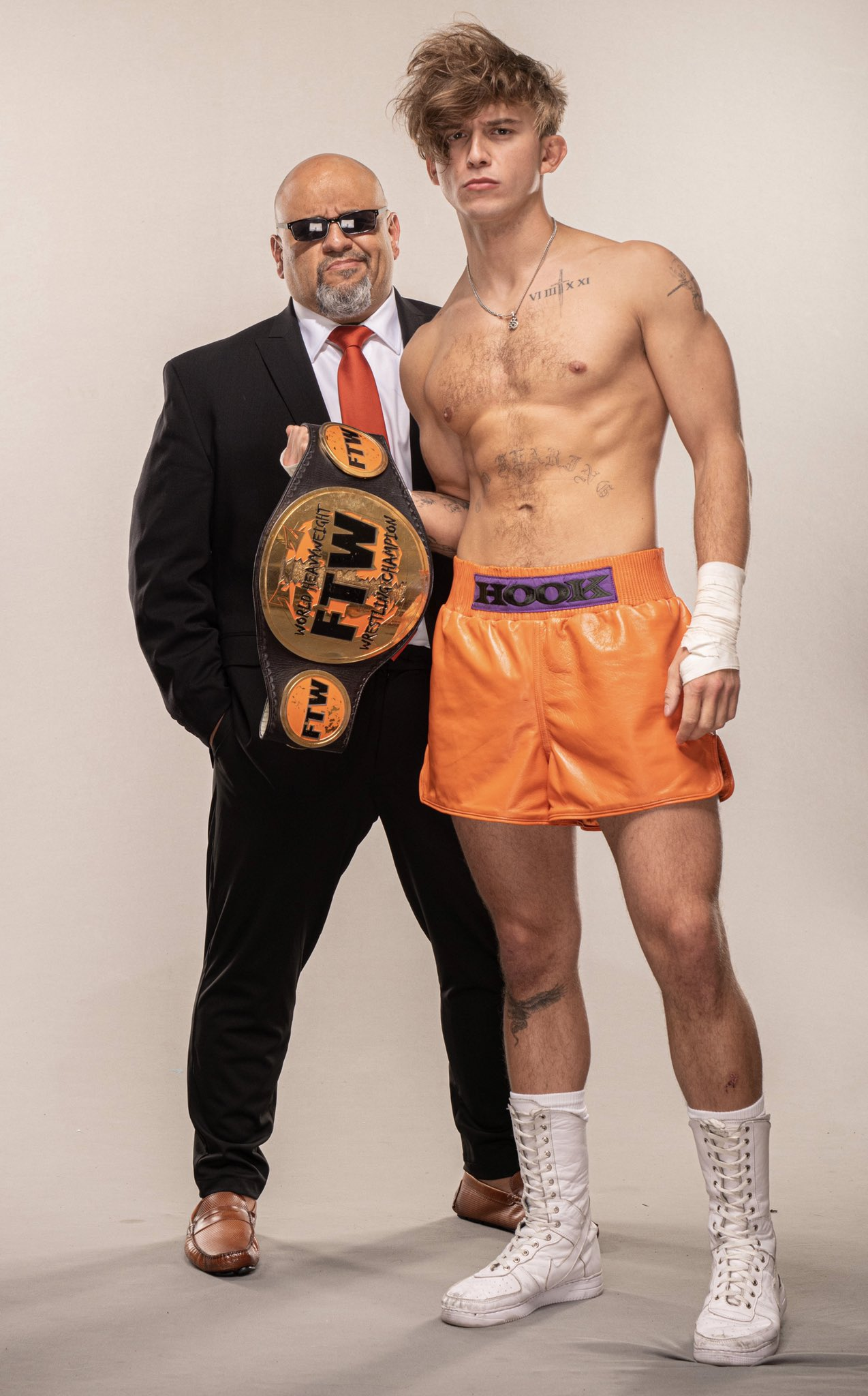
Hook as FTW Champion in AEW. His father, Taz, appears in the background and was the original holder of the title in ECW.

The concept of championships, and their central role in wrestling, allows for the potential for angles. One such angle is an unsanctioned championship title. These are claimed by a wrestler and defended in sanctioned matches, but are not recognized as legitimate titles by the promotion.

Examples of unsanctioned championships include:

- Ted DiBiase's Million Dollar Championship in WWE
- Taz's FTW Championship in ECW and AEW
- James Storm's TNA World Beer Drinking Championship in TNA
- Zack Ryder's WWE Internet Championship in WWE
