= Wrestle Kingdom (video game) =

2005 video game

- Xbox 360 cover art Featuring Mitsuharu Misawa, Masahiro Chono and Keiji Mutoh
- Developer: Yuke's
- Publisher: Yuke's
- Platforms: Xbox 360, PlayStation 2
- Release: Xbox 360: JP: 22 December 2005; PlayStation 2: JP: 20 July 2006
- Genre: Fighting
- Modes: Single-player, multiplayer

Wrestle Kingdom (レッスルキングダム, Ressuru Kingudamu) is a licensed professional wrestling video game by Yuke's, released in Japan for the Xbox 360 and PlayStation 2. The game combines the top stars of New Japan Pro-Wrestling, All Japan Pro Wrestling, Pro Wrestling Noah, and freelancers.

The Xbox 360 version of the game was temporarily recalled in Japan due to it not saving properly to the system's hard drive. A release event planned for the following two days after its release was cancelled.

A sequel, Wrestle Kingdom 2, was released in May 2007.

== Gameplay ==
Wrestle Kingdom uses a modified engine seen in previous Yuke's games, the WWE Day of Reckoning series. While not as simulation-based as its Japanese contemporaries, it is also not as frantic and arcade-like as its American counterparts.

Wrestle Kingdom has the basic wrestling video game matches, including singles, tag teams, triple threats, fatal four ways, and battle royals. No specialty matches are featured.

The defining mode in Wrestle Kingdom is the Drama mode. In this mode, players must create a wrestler and train under one of the top stars from each promotion. As they go, they must train to improve their stats. This is the only way to unlock more moves.

Towards the end, the player will pick from a list of promotional titles or tournaments, such as the G1 Climax. Depending on which the player selects, they can unlock certain wrestlers and unlock their trainer's move set.

== Roster ==
The game's roster features wrestlers from the top three Japanese promotions - New Japan Pro-Wrestling, All Japan Pro Wrestling and Pro Wrestling Noah - as well as freelancers and legends. Brock Lesnar and Giant Bernard are exclusive to the PlayStation 2 version of the game. Conversely, Kazuyuki Fujita is an exclusive to the Xbox 360 version.

== Reception ==
Wrestle Kingdom received generally positive reviews. Alfred Alfonso, writing for American website IGN, enjoyed the PS2 version of the game, praising the Drama mode and graphics, but criticized the length of the loading times.

== See also ==
- Wrestle Kingdom 2
