= Nosawa Rongai =

Japanese professional wrestler

Kazushige Nosawa
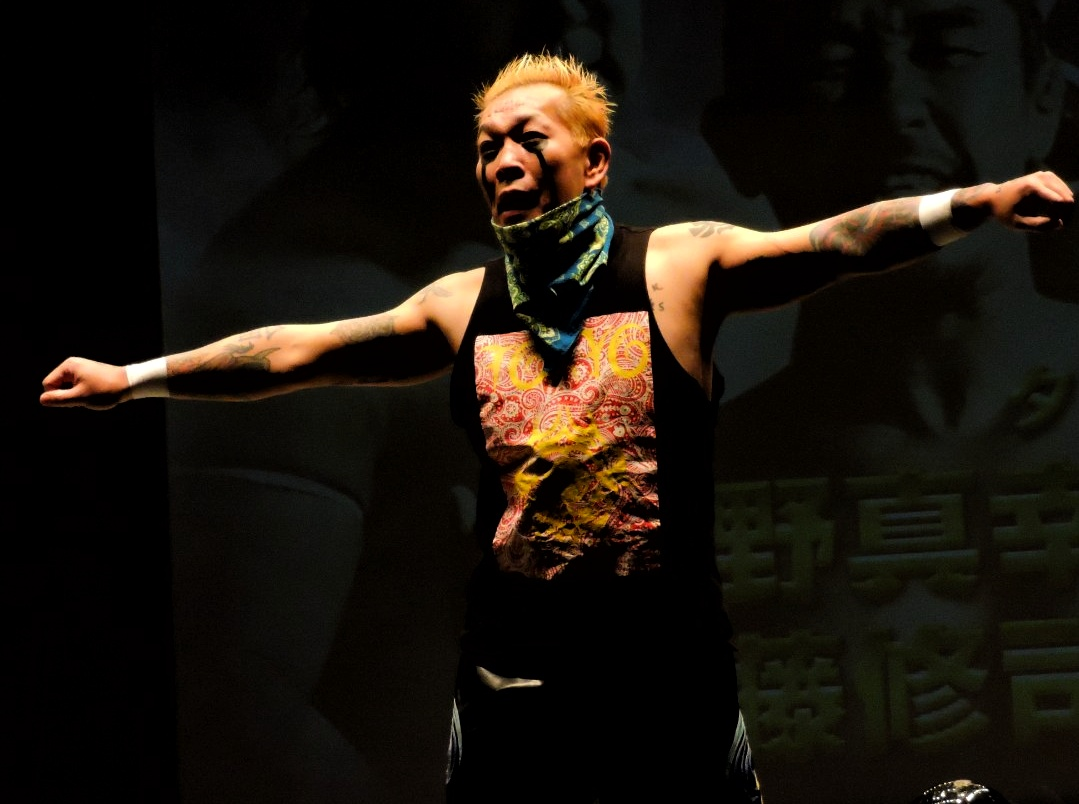
- Nosawa in 2017

Personal information
- Born: Kazushige Nosawa; December 17, 1976 (age 49) Ichikawa, Chiba, Japan

Professional wrestling career
- Ring names: Black Death; Black Tiger VII; Kazushige Nosawa; Nosawa Rongai; Nosawa; Nosawa Mendoza; Noja; Nozawa; Parka Guerrera; Space Lone Wolf; Super Cacao
- Billed height: 1.78 m (5 ft 10 in)
- Billed weight: 86 kg (190 lb)
- Billed from: Ichikawa, Chiba, Japan
- Trained by: Negro Casas; Tatsumi Fujinami; Minoru Suzuki
- Debut: December 27, 1995
- Retired: February 21, 2023

Kazushige Nosawa (野沢 一茂, Nosawa Kazushige; born December 17, 1976), better known by his ring names Nosawa and Nosawa Rongai (NOSAWA論外), is a Japanese retired professional wrestler, best known for his appearances in All Japan Pro Wrestling and various independent promotions.

== Career ==
=== Early career (1995–2004) ===
Nosawa spent most of his early career training and wrestling in Mexico, most notably with Consejo Mundial de Lucha Libre (CMLL). He also spent much of his early career competing on the U.S. independent scene, Nosawa has competed for American promotions such as Ring of Honor (ROH), Pro Wrestling Guerrilla (PWG), and Xtreme Pro Wrestling (XPW). Along with Mitsunobu Kikuzawa, Kazuhiko Masada, Minoru Fujita and Katsushi Takemura, Nosawa created the group "Tokyo Gurentai".

In 2004, he would adapt the "Nosawa Rongai" or "Nosawa Out of the Question" ring name as a play off to a comment made by Kaz Hayashi, who had replied "Nosawa is out of the question" when he was asked about whether he was going to allow Kazushige to challenge for the World Junior Heavyweight Championship. By doing this, Nosawa forced a title match against Hayashi, and although he lost, he would decide to keep the name for the rest of his career.

=== Juggalo Championship Wrestling ===
==== JCW Heavyweight Champion (2003–2007) ====
On March 16, 2003, at a Juggalo Championship Wrestling (JCW) event, Nosawa defeated "Richie Boy" Breyer Wellington to win the JCW Heavyweight Championship. Later that year, he was featured on JCW Vol. 3 in a match where he again defeated Wellington. In July 2004, Nosawa lost the championship to Kid Kash at the Gathering of the Juggalos. In 2007, he took part in the Pro Wrestling Unplugged/Juggalo Championship Wrestling cross promotional event "Cuffed & Caged: Last Man Standing". Nosawa was featured in the main event War Games match as a member of Team JCW.

==== SlamTV! (2007) ====
In 2007, Nosawa went on tour with JCW to film the Internet wrestling show SlamTV!, where he was one of the main heroes of the program. However, he started off his SlamTV! tour with a string of losses, going 0–5 in his first five matches. After receiving a letter from his storyline mentor The Great Muta, saying that Muta was coming to JCW to check up on his pupil, Nosawa stepped up his game and began a winning streak. At "East Side Wars", The Great Muta teamed with Nosawa to help him defeat the team of Mad Man Pondo and Necro Butcher. By the following week however, The Great Muta had left. Despite this, Nosawa continued his winning streak into episode 14, where he faced and defeated Ron Zombie. During the match, Justin Credible came to the ring and assaulted Nosawa. On the next episode, Nosawa interfered in Credible's match by spitting Asian mist into his eyes. At Bloodymania, Nosawa and The Great Muta teamed up again to defeat Justin Credible and 2 Cold Scorpio.

==== Juggalo World Order (2007–2008) ====
On October 6, 2007, Corporal Robinson, Scott Hall, and Violent J formed the Juggalo World Order (JWO) at Evansville Invasion. At that year's Hallowicked After Party, on October 31, Shaggy 2 Dope was introduced as a member of the group. After the main event of the night, special guest referee Nosawa ripped off his referee shirt to reveal that he, too, was a member of the JWO. Nosawa appeared in a few matches with the JWO, before returning to Japan.

=== Total Nonstop Action Wrestling (2003–2004) ===
Nosawa would first gain national U.S. exposure by making appearances for Total Nonstop Action Wrestling (TNA). He debuted at the 2003 Super X Cup, losing in the first round to Juventud Guerrera; he then reappeared as captain of Team Japan in the 2004 World X Cup, where he ended up placing last by the end of the tournament. Nosawa would go on to make sporadic appearances on the early episodes of TNA Impact!, usually teaming up with fellow Japanese rookie Kazushi Miyamoto. The duo even challenged for the NWA World Tag Team Championship at TNA's second Anniversary show in June 2004, but ultimately came up short against America's Most Wanted. The duo's last in-ring appearance for the company would be at Victory Road '04, where both Nosawa and Miyamoto competed in the X-Division Gauntlet match, which was won by Héctor Garza.

=== All Japan Pro Wrestling (2005–2008) ===
Nosawa would originally find little success after arriving in All Japan Pro Wrestling (AJPW) in the mid-2000s, losing as many matches as he won. On March 20, 2005, he received an opportunity at the World Junior Heavyweight Championship, but would lose to defending champion Taka Michinoku. On July 26, he lost a "Banishment" match to his old friend Mazada, and was forced to leave All Japan. Soon after that, he would reappear as a masked wrestler named Space Lone Wolf (Keiji Mutoh's old alter-ego), finding more success than his previous character. However, by December, Space Lone Wolf would be unmasked and revealed as being Nosawa.

In 2006, Nosawa would begin again wrestling with his old friend Mazada again, and for parts of the year would also team with Brute Issei and Akira. Towards the end of 2006, Nosawa and Mazada began to team up with Minoru Suzuki to form "Minoru Gundan", which landed Nosawa a more prominent role in the promotion. He and Suzuki would go on to wrestle in the World's Strongest Tag Determination League, but the team would come in last place.

In 2007, Nosawa promoted several comedy wrestling shows, making fun of Antonio Inoki's Inoki Genome Federation and using both talent from All Japan, as well as freelancers. During the Champion Carnival, Nosawa switched his name to El Nosawa Mendoza and formed a new stable called "Los Mexico Amigos", with Pepe Michinoku (Taka Michinoku) and Miguel Hayashi, Jr (Kaz Hayashi). Nobutaka Araya then joined the team as El Hijo del Araya Segundo after the Carnival's final show. Along with changing their names, the group wore the official colors of the Mexican Flag (Red/Green/White). After multiple bouts against Minoru Suzuki, Nosawa offered Suzuki an invitation into Mexico Amigos, to which he declined. This resulted in the group changing multiple assets. Their name was changed to Mexico Amigos Black, the previous worn Mexican Flag attire became black and gold attire, and Araya was kicked out of the group. Later in the year, Mexico Amigos teamed with "Ray Suzuki" to defeat the team of Ryuji Hijikata, Kikutaro, T28 and Ryuji Yamaguchi. After the match, Ray Suzuki revealed himself as Minoru Suzuki. Suzuki stated that starting the next year Mendoza would throw his Amigos tights away and return to the Nosawa Rongai ring name, Suzuki then kidnapped Nosawa to start his "early training". This was followed by Pepe and Miguel announcing they would return to Mexico, while Kaz Hayashi and Taka Michinoku were announced as returning to All Japan come the new year. After one last "Viva Mexico", Los Mexico Amigos disbanded.

=== Tokyo Gurentai and other promotions (2007–2023) ===
Since disbanding from Mexico Amigos, Nosawa has rejoined teaming with Mazada and Takemura as the "Tokyo Gurentai". Nosawa, Mazada, and Takemura later align themselves with Minoru Suzuki and Taiyō Kea, and dubbed their new group GURENTAI. Nosawa won a game of Jenga for the group's leadership role, but Suzuki immediately shot down the idea of Nosawa as the leader. Nosawa would later return to All Japan Pro Wrestling (AJPW) and was defeated by Rene Dupree in his return match.

Outside of AJPW, Nosawa performed for companies under the Global Professional Wrestling Alliance (GPWA) banner up until the alliance's demise, sometimes alongside his mentor Keiji Mutoh.

On February 20, 2011, Nosawa was arrested on charges of stealing a taxi and driving it without having a driving license. Two days later Nosawa announced that he was taking an indefinite break from professional wrestling. Nosawa returned from his break on June 25 at a Minoru Suzuki promoted charity event, losing to Suzuki in the main event.

Since September 2013, Tokyo Gurentai, Nosawa included, has worked regularly for Wrestle-1.

Since April 2015, Nosawa joined the newly resurrected Frontier Martial-Arts Wrestling, as the leader of Monster-gun, which evolved into W*ING Monster-gun, when Kintaro Kanemura joined the group.

On August 27, 2017, Nosawa, as Black Tiger VII, teamed with Taka Michinoku to defeat Atsushi Aoki and Hikaru Sato for the AJPW All Asia Tag Team Championship. They lost the title to Naoya Nomura and Yuma Aoyagi on September 30.

Nosawa is currently working as the head booker for Pro Wrestling Noah.

==== Los Perros del Mal de Japón and retirement ====
In December 2020, Kotaro Suzuki aligned himself with Rongai and his mystery partner, who later revealed to be Ikuto Hidaka. Over the following months, the trio continued their rivalry with Stinger, while also being joined by Yo-Hey in May 2021 following the disbandment of Full Trottle. The following month, Dragon Gate wrestler Eita, who had previously worked in Mexican wrestling promotions and met Rongai in 2017, was revealed to be the newest member of the group.

On June 27, at Muta The World, the stable's name was revealed to be dubbed Los Perros del Mal de Japón, as a tribute to the Mexican stable Los Perros del Mal after Eita, Rongai and Yo-Hey won against Stinger (Yoshinari Ogawa, Seiki Yoshioka and Yuya Susumu). A brawl began between the two stables with Suzuki and Ikuto Hidaka coming to help them, outnumbering and overwhelming Stinger. Rongai later revealed that relatives of Perro Aguayo Jr., the founders of the Los Perros del Mal, had granted him permission to use the stable's name.

At Grand Square 2021 In Osaka, Eita and Rongai defeated Atsushi Kotoge and Hajime Ohara to win the GHC Junior Heavyweight Tag Team Championship.

At Noah The New Year 2023 on January 1, Rongai teamed up with Hiroshi Hase and Sugiura-gun members Kazuyuki Fujita and Kendo Kashin to defeat Kongo (Katsuhiko Nakajima, Masakatsu Funaki, Manabu Soya and Hajime Ohara). At The Great Muta Final "Bye-Bye" on January 22, Nosawa Rongai and Eita teamed up with Yoshinari Ogawa in a losing effort against Junta Miyawaki, Alejandro and Yasutaka Yano. On February 21, 2023, Rongai would have his retirement match where he teamed with Mazada in a losing effort against Bullet Club (Taiji Ishimori and Gedo).

== Personal life ==
=== Marijuana arrest ===
On May 23, 2012, Nosawa and former girlfriend Io Shirai were arrested at the Narita International Airport in Narita, Chiba upon their return from Mexico to Japan under suspicion of trying to smuggle 75 grams of marijuana, hidden inside paintings of the two, into the country. On July 9, Mexico-based Japanese wrestler Takuya Sugi held a press conference and confessed to planting the drugs on Shirai and Nosawa.

== Championships and accomplishments ==
- All Japan Pro Wrestling
  - All Asia Tag Team Championship (3 times) – with Minoru Suzuki (1), Taka Michinoku (1) and Kendo Kashin (1)
  - AJPW Junior Tag League (2006) – with Mazada
- Apache Army
  - WEW World Tag Team Championship (1 time) – with Mazada
- Chō Sentō Puroresu FMW
  - FMW World Street Fight 8-Man Tag Team Championship (1 time) – with Black Tiger V, Great Tiger and Tiger Mask III Tigre en Mascarado
- Consejo Mundial de Lucha Libre
  - CMLL Japan Tag Team Championship (1 time) – with Sasuke the Great
  - CMLL World Welterweight Championship (2 times)
- Dragon Gate
  - Open the Triangle Gate Championship (2 times) – with Kotaro Suzuki and Eita
- Dramatic Dream Team/DDT Pro-Wrestling
  - DDT Extreme Championship (1 time)
  - KO-D Openweight Championship (1 time)
  - KO-D Tag Team Championship (1 time) – with Takashi Sasaki
  - UWA World Trios Championship (2 times) – with Fujita and Mazada
- El Dorado Wrestling
  - UWA World Tag Team Championship (1 time) – with Mazada
- International Wrestling Revolution Group
  - IWRG Intercontinental Tag Team Championship (1 time) – with Masada
  - IWRG Intercontinental Trios Championship (1 time) – with Masada and Takemura
  - Copa Higher Power (2004) – with Masada, Garuda and Black Tiger III
- Juggalo Championship Wrestling
  - JCW Heavyweight Championship (1 time)
- Mobius
  - Apex of Triangle Six–Man Tag Team Championship (2 times) - with Mazada and Takemura (1) and Daisuke Sekimoto and Tetsuhiro Kuroda (1)
- New Japan Pro-Wrestling
  - Road to the Super Jr.2Days Tournament (2012)
- Pro Wrestling Noah
  - GHC Junior Heavyweight Tag Team Championship (1 time) – with Eita
- Tokyo Gurentai
  - Tokyo World Heavyweight Championship (1 time)
  - Tokyo World Tag Team Championship (1 time) – with Mazada
- Wrestle-1
  - UWA World Trios Championship (4 times) – with Kazma Sakamoto and Koji Doi (1), Jun Kasai and Shuji Kondo (1), Ganseki Tanaka and Manabu Soya (1), and Fujita and Mazada (1)
- Xtreme Latin American Wrestling
  - X-LAW International Championship (1 time)
- Other titles
  - Americas World Mixed Tag Team Championship (1 time) – with Io Shirai
  - Arena Azteca Budokan Light Heavyweight Championship (1 time)
  - Guerrero State Welterweight Championship (1 time)

== Luchas de Apuestas record ==
Winner (wager)	Loser (wager)	Location	Event	Date	Notes
Arkangel de la Muerte (mask)	NOSAWA (hair)	Unknown	Live event	Unknown	
Tigre Blanco (mask)	Super Cacao (mask)	Mexico City	Live event	October 19, 1999	
Tony Rivera (hair)	Super Cacao (hair)	Mexico City	Live event	May 18, 2000	(Note: Lost a Relevos Suicidas match against Brazo de Oro and Fugaz.)
Ricky Marvin (hair)	Super Cacao (hair)	Mexico City	Live event	May 28, 2000	(Note: Relevos Suicidas match with Marvin and Cacao vs. Fugaz and Tony Rivera.)
Mike Segura and Último Vampiro (hair)	NOSAWA and MASADA (hair)	Naucalpan, Mexico State	Live event	May 31, 2001	
Negro Casas and El Satánico (hair)	NOSAWA and MASADA (hair)	Mexico City	Live event	May 16, 2003	
