= Koji Kanemoto =

Korean Japanese wrestler (born 1966)

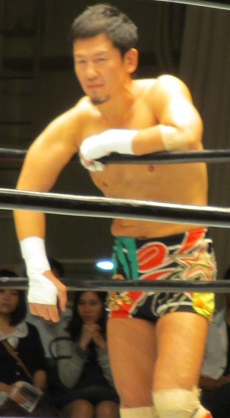
- Kanemoto in September 2014

Personal information
- Born: October 31, 1966 (age 59) Kobe, Hyōgo, Japan

Professional wrestling career
- Ring name(s): Koji Kanemoto; Tiger Mask (III); Tiger Mask III; Tigre en Mascarado
- Billed height: 1.80 m (5 ft 11 in)
- Billed weight: 80 kg (176 lb)
- Trained by: Masanobu Kurisu; Kensuke Sasaki; Hiroshi Hase; Kuniaki Kobayashi; NJPW Dojo
- Debut: November 7, 1990

Kōji Kanemoto (金本 浩二, Kanemoto Kōji; Korean: 김일우; October 31, 1966) is a Japanese professional wrestler of Zainichi Korean descent. He has previously worked with New Japan Pro-Wrestling and All Japan Pro Wrestling. He is currently a freelancer.

== Professional wrestling career ==
Kanemoto practiced Judo during his high school days and won a few championships as a professional before being recruited by the New Japan Pro-Wrestling (NJPW) Dojo. He debuted in November 1990, wrestling against Michiyoshi Ohara. In March 1992, he portrayed Tiger Mask in its third incarnation, succeeding Mitsuharu Misawa. In January 1994, he famously lost a "mask vs. mask" match against popular cruiserweight Jushin Thunder Liger at Battlefield. Since 1994 he has wrestled under his own name for NJPW. His style used to be the classic junior heavyweight wrestling, but repeated high-flying moves, the fans' change in taste, and inherent damage on his body put an incentive on him to use shoot-style taught by Kazuo Yamazaki, largely as a modification of his wrestling persona. Hard shoot kicks combined with scientific wrestling are his current trademark along with the facewash, which always gets the crowd going in a football stadium-like chant.

Kanemoto was the first man to defend the IWGP Junior Heavyweight Championship in the United States, a match against Alex Wright at Starrcade '95: World Cup of Wrestling (although World Championship Wrestling did not announce it as such). He also holds a victory over revered MMA fighter Kazushi Sakuraba in shoot-style wrestling. He worked for a few matches for WCW in late 1995.

In the early 2000s Kanemoto formed a popular tag team with Minoru Tanaka called "Jr. Stars" the 2 enjoyed a lengthy reign as IWGP Junior Heavyweight Tag Team Champions, but before they could receive a rematch for their titles, Kanemoto was injured. Kanemoto made a very controversial return, turning on Tanaka and siding with Masahiro Chono's "Team 2000" Stable. As a reward for his defection Chono gave him his own sub-group to lead named "Team 2000 Jr."; among their ranks were Gedo, Jado, & Akira. During this time, Kanemoto wore entrance gear very similar to Chono, as a way to show "he was a boss". After Team 2000 dissolved he became a calmer, much more calculating individual and it was apparent that his days of a rude, arrogant punk were over. In 2003, in an attempt to regain the Junior Heavyweight Tag Team titles from rival promotion Pro Wrestling Noah, he formed a tag team with Jushin Thunder Liger known as "The Unbeatables"; the two held on to the titles until November, when Kanemoto fractured his left cheekbone, and were forced to vacate them.

On May 3, 2006, Kanemoto defeated Tiger Mask IV to win the IWGP Junior Heavyweight Title for the fifth time.

In the 2006 G1 Climax, Kanemoto reached the semi-final, the first junior heavyweight to achieve this feat. Along with Hiroshi Tanahashi, he made it to the finals of the G1 Tag League two consecutive seasons – the 2006 and 2007 editions. Also in 2007 he became the first junior heavyweight since Bas Rutten to receive an IWGP Heavyweight Championship match. Although he lost this match against his tag team partner Hiroshi Tanahashi he was revered for his performance, especially after kicking out of Tanahashi's dragon suplex finish after only a 1 count. After this match it was regarded that Kanemoto was not only the top junior heavyweight but one of the top talents that New Japan has in its entirety.

On January 2, 2009, at a Zero-1 show Kanemoto announced his engagement to Zero-1 joshi wrestler Hikaru. The two have since divorced.

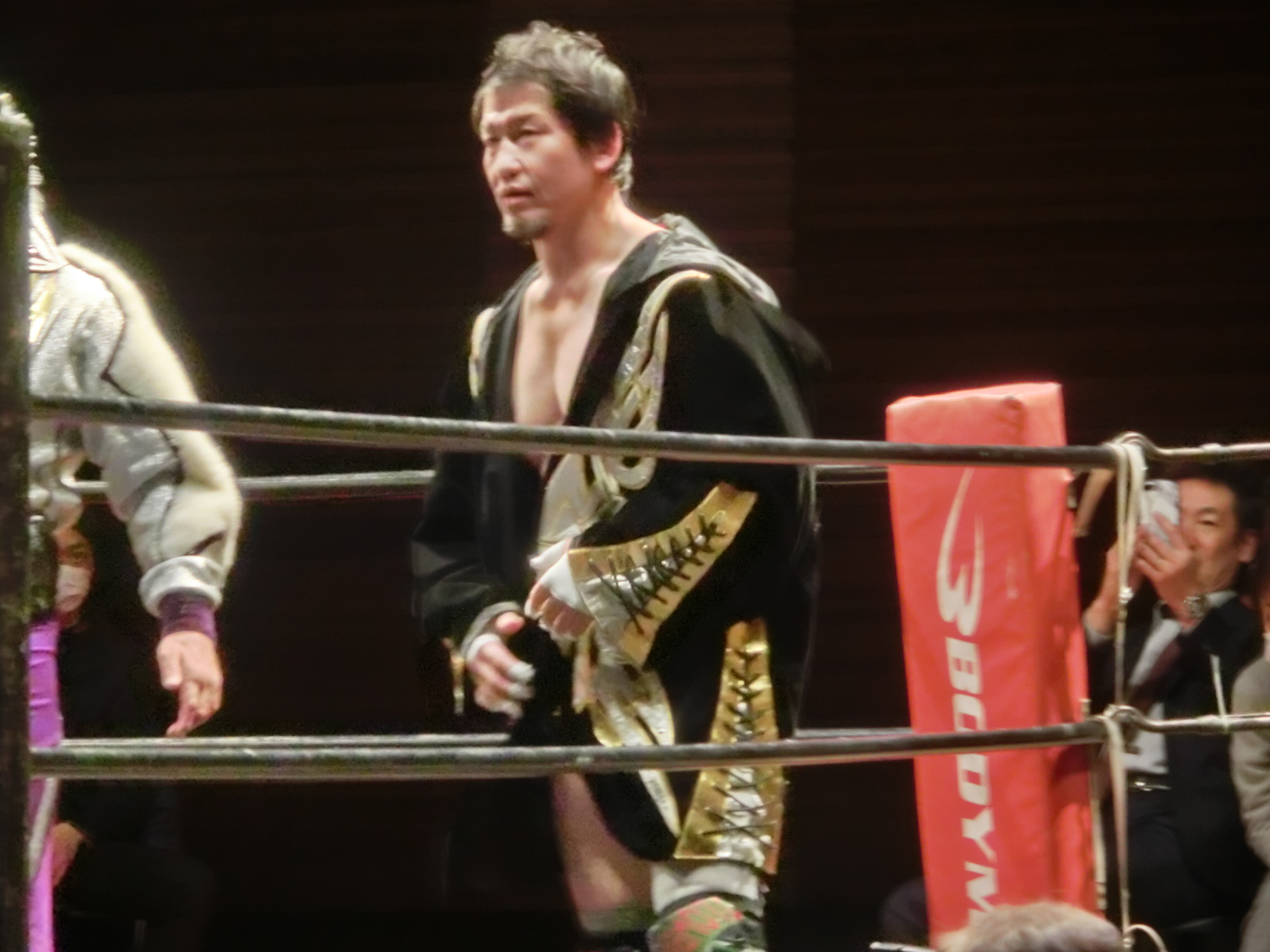
Kanemoto in 2019.

On June 14, 2009, Kanemoto forced Prince Devitt to submit to his trademark Ankle Lock, winning the Best of the Super Juniors tournament for the third time, becoming only the second man to do so. On May 8, 2010, Kanemoto and El Samurai defeated Apollo 55 (Prince Devitt and Ryusuke Taguchi) in the finals of an eight team tournament to win the IWGP Junior Heavyweight Tag Team Championship. Just over two months later, on July 19, Kanemoto and El Samurai lost the Junior Heavyweight Tag Team Championship to Devitt and Taguchi. On August 22 Kanemoto and Tiger Mask IV took part in a Pro Wrestling Noah event and defeated Ricky Marvin and Taiji Ishimori to win Noah's GHC Junior Heavyweight Tag Team Championship. They would lose the title to Atsushi Aoki and Naomichi Marufuji on December 24, 2010.

In late 2011 he began to work more frequently in All Japan Pro Wrestling (AJPW) and teaming with Minoru Tanaka and on January 31, 2013, Kanemoto officially quit New Japan Pro-Wrestling to join All Japan Pro Wrestling. In June 2013, Kojimoto also announced his resignation from All Japan in the aftermath of Nobuo Shiraishi taking over as the promotion's new president. Though Kanemoto did not officially join Keiji Mutoh's splinter promotion Wrestle-1, he did take part in the promotion's inaugural event on September 8, reuniting the Junior Stars with Minoru Tanaka in a tag team match, where they defeated Fujita Hayato and Masaaki Mochizuki.

On May 24, 2015, Kanemoto returned to his Tiger Mask persona, when he took part in Lucha Libre AAA World Wide's Lucha Libre World Cup in Mexico City, alongside Kenzo Suzuki and Masamune as Team AJPW. They were defeated in the first round of the tournament by Team MexLeyendas (Blue Demon Jr., Dr. Wagner Jr. and El Solar).

== Championships and accomplishments ==
- 4 Front Wrestling
  - 4FW Junior Heavyweight Championship (1 time)
- All Japan Pro Wrestling
  - All Asia Tag Team Championship (2 times) – with Minoru Tanaka
- Apache Pro-Wrestling Army
  - WEW Heavyweight Championship (1 time)
- Asia Wrestling Federation
  - AWF Tag Team Championship (1 time) – with Tae-San Choi
- Chō Sentō Puroresu FMW
  - FMW World Street Fight 8-Man Tag Team Championship (1 time, current) – with Black Tiger V, Black Tiger VII and Great Tiger
- New Japan Pro-Wrestling
  - IWGP Junior Heavyweight Championship (5 times)
  - IWGP Junior Heavyweight Tag Team Championship (4 times) – with Minoru Tanaka (1), Jushin Thunder Liger (1), Wataru Inoue (1) and El Samurai (1)
  - UWA World Junior Light Heavyweight Championship (1 time)
  - Best of the Super Juniors (1998, 2002, 2009)
  - National District Tournament (2006) – with Shinsuke Nakamura
  - Super J Tag Tournament (2010) – with El Samurai
  - Outstanding Performance Award (2002)
  - Tag Team Best Bout (2003) with Jushin Thunder Liger vs. Kotaro Suzuki and Naomichi Marufuji on June 10
- Pro Wrestling Illustrated
  - PWI ranked him #24 of the top 500 singles wrestlers in the PWI 500 in 2003
  - PWI ranked him #104 of the top 500 singles wrestlers of the "PWI Years" in 2003
- Pro Wrestling Noah
  - GHC Junior Heavyweight Tag Team Championship (1 time) – with Tiger Mask IV
- Pro Wrestling Zero1
  - NWA International Lightweight Tag Team Championship (1 time) – with Minoru Tanaka
- Universal Wrestling Association
  - UWA World Welterweight Championship (1 time)
- VKF Pro-Wrestling
  - VKF Championship (1 time)
- Wrestling Observer Newsletter
  - Most Outstanding Wrestler (1998)

=== Luchas de Apuestas record ===
Winner (wager)	Loser (wager)	Location	Event	Date	Notes
Jushin Thunder Liger (mask)	Tiger Mask (mask)	Tokyo, Japan	Battlefield	January 4, 1994	
