= Rory Tapner =

British businessman (born 1959)

- Born: September 30, 1959 (age 66)
- Education: King's College London
- Occupation: Recently CEO Coutts
- Children: Rosie Tapner

Rory Tapner (born 30 September 1959) is a British businessman who, in September 2010 was appointed CEO of Coutts, the Wealth Management division of Royal Bank of Scotland Group. In February 2015 he stepped down as CEO; he was replaced in the role by Alison Rose, the then head of RBS Commercial and Private Banking. Prior to this, he was Chairman and CEO Asia Pacific at UBS AG from May 2004 until June 2009 and a member of the UBS Group Executive Board from 2006 until June 2009 when he stepped down and returned to the UK. In June 2019 he was appointed Chair of the Board at Brown Shipley Holdings Limited. In May 2020, Tapner was named Chairman of the Board of Directors of Quintet Private Bank, Brown Shipley's parent.

== Education and personal life ==
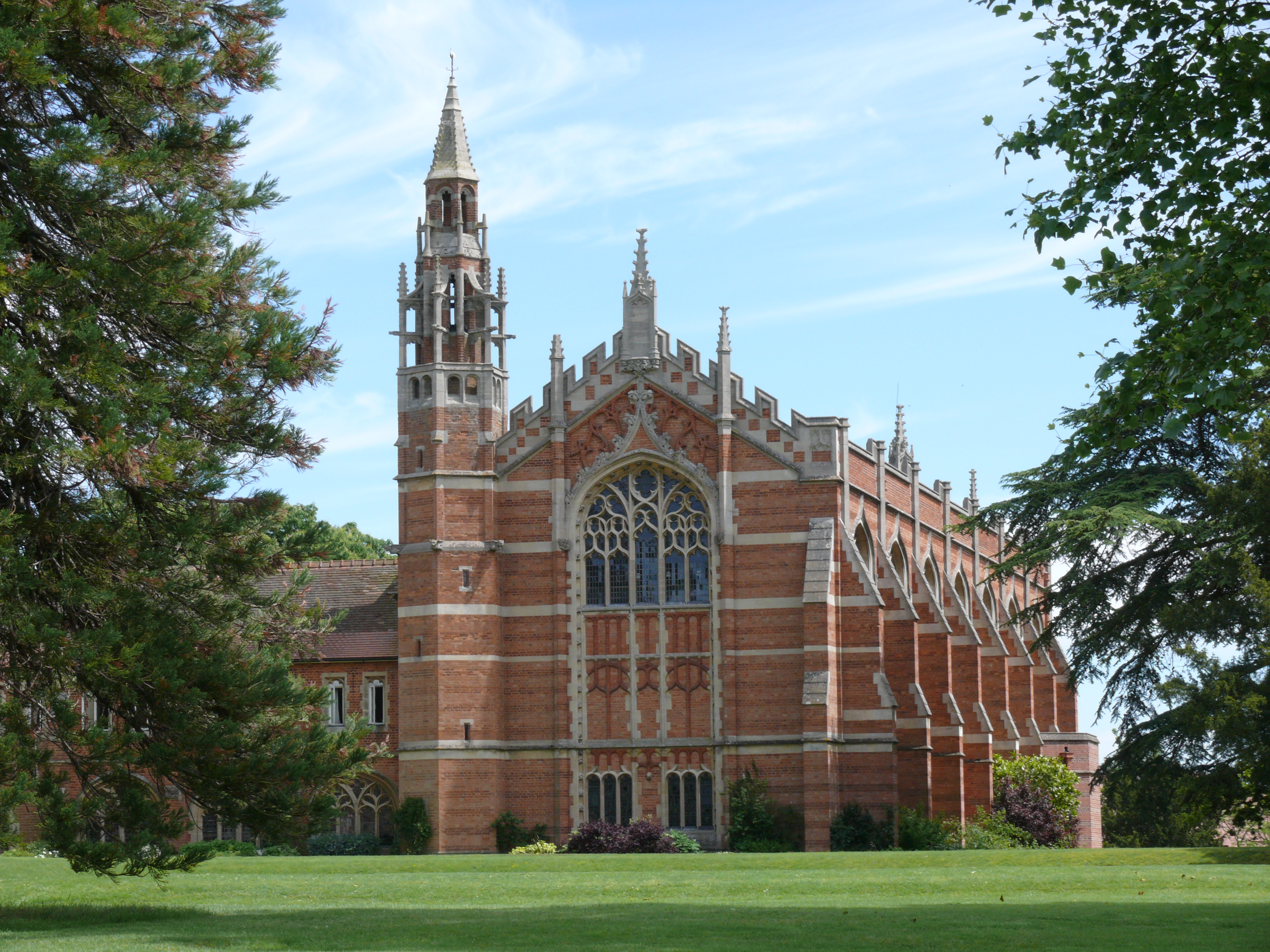
Radley College

He was educated at Radley College and at King's College London (LLB, 1982). His eldest son, Freddie Tapner is the founder of The London Musical Theatre Orchestra, and its principal Conductor. His younger daughter is the TV presenter and model Rosie Tapner.

== Career ==
From 1983 to 2009 he was with UBS AG and predecessor firms (SG Warburg, SBC Warburg and UBS Warburg) and held the following roles - Joint Head of UK Corporate Finance and Head of UK Capital Markets Team; Global Head of Equity Capital Markets; Joint Global Head of Investment Banking; Chairman of Investment Banking; and Chairman and CEO UBS Asia Pacific. He was a member of UBS Investment Bank Executive Board from 1996 until 2004, and from 2006 joined the UBS Group Executive Board. In September 2010 he was appointed CEO of Coutts Bank, the wealth management division of RBS Group from which he stepped down in March 2015.

== Activities ==
For 9 years, Tapner was the Hon. Treasurer and Chairman of the Financial Committee of the Council of King's College London. He was Deputy Chairman of the World Questions; King's Answers fundraising campaign. He is a Fellow of King's College, London. He is, or has been, Chairman of various organisations including : GB Snowsport, the governing body of British Snowsports; Quintet Private Bank; and SPS Technology.
