= Tapering =

Tapering may refer to:

- Tapering (economics), reduction of the quantitative easing program in the US
- Tapering (mathematics), a type of shape transformation
- Tapering (medicine), reduction in medicine dose over time
  - Opioid tapering, reduction in opioid dose over time
- Tapering (signal processing)
- Tapering (sports), reducing exercise in the days just before a competition
