= Tapir (disambiguation) =

Tapir is a pig-like animal. Tapir may also refer to:

- Tapir!, an English indie folk band from London
- Tapir 590 (born 1989), Peruvian Internet celebrity and entertainer
- Tapir Mountain Nature Reserve, a nature reserve in Belize
- HMS Tapir (P335), a World War II British submarine
- Tapir Gao (born 1964), Indian politician
