= Rosie Tapner =

British model

- Born: Rose Edwina Tapner; 16 October 1995 (age 31); Westminster, London, England
- Occupations: Model; television presenter
- Parent: Rory Tapner
- Modeling information
- Height: 5 ft 9 in (1.75 m)
- Hair color: Blonde hair
- Eye color: Grey
- Agency: The Society Management (New York); Elite Model Management (Paris) d'management group (Milan); The Squad (London); Scoop Models (Copenhagen); Model Management (Hamburg); Stockholmsgruppen (Stockholm)

Rose Edwina Tapner (born 16 October 1995) is an English model and television presenter.

== Background ==
Rose Edwina Tapner was born on 16 October 1995 in London and grew up in Chipperfield, Hertfordshire. She is the daughter of Alex and Rory Tapner, and she has a brother, Arthur. She was educated at Downe House School, in Cold Ash, Berkshire, graduating in 2014. Tapner has taken part in British Eventing competitions, and in July 2014, she was appointed an ambassador for the British Equestrian Federation.

== Career ==
Tapner was discovered by Storm Model Management in 2011 at the Birmingham Clothes Show Live, and soon after, at the age of 15, became the face of Balenciaga's 2012 campaigns. Since then Tapner has appeared in campaigns for Topshop, Selfridges, Chloé, Burberry, and has been featured in Numéro, Pop, British Vogue, W, and LOVE. Tapner has walked for designers including Giles Deacon, Michael van der Ham, Todd Lynn, and Nicolas Ghesquière, and has been shot by photographers including Steven Meisel.

Tapner has been compared to fellow British model Cara Delevingne.

== Personal life ==
Tapner is friends with fellow British models Cara Delevingne and Jourdan Dunn.
