= Bruce Elliot Tapper =

American anthropologist

Bruce Elliot Tapper (born in the United States) is a social anthropologist, journalist, writer, and editor. He has published numerous articles on Telugu society and culture in Andhra Pradesh, and shadow puppets as a form of entertainment. He lived in a small village called Aripaka, close to Visakhapatnam, from 1970–72 to research the social structure and religious customs of the farmers and various other occupational communities in the village.

== Education ==
He obtained his B.A. in anthropology in 1966 and M.A. in Indian studies in 1968, both from the University of Wisconsin–Madison. He obtained his Ph.D. in social anthropology in 1976 from the School of Oriental and African Studies, University of London. He first conducted research in India as a member of the University of Wisconsin–Madison College year in India Programme 1966–67, at Osmania University, Hyderabad. He was awarded a Fulbright-Hays Grant for his doctoral research in Andhra Pradesh, which he carried out in 1970-72 while affiliated with Andhra University, Waltair (Visakhapatnam).

== Career ==
Tapper taught social anthropology at the University of Adelaide, South Australia in 1976–77. He then returned to the United States, where he became a seminar associate of the Southern Asian Institute, Columbia University, New York City. After obtaining an M.Sc. in journalism from the Columbia University Graduate School of Journalism in 1980, he moved to Washington, D.C., where he became a writer, reporter, researcher and editor. He was an editor at the Smithsonian Associates Program in the early 1980s and then had a career as an editor at the Library of Congress, the Smithsonian's National Museum of Asian Art, the American Occupational Therapy Association, and the United States Holocaust Memorial Museum. He is currently retired.

== Publications ==
Tapper has published articles on several aspects of Andhra society, and conducted research and written on traditional Andhra shadow puppetry.

- Rivalry and Tribute: Society and Ritual in a Telugu Village in South India. Studies in Sociology and Anthropology Series. Delhi: Hindustan Publishing Corp., 1987, 325 pp.
- “Shadow Puppets of Andhra Pradesh.” Asian Art and Culture 7 (Spring–Summer 1994): 40–63. Oxford University Press, in association with the Arthur M. Sackler Gallery, Smithsonian Institution, Washington, D.C.
- “An Enactment of Perfect Morality: The Meaning and Social Context of a South Indian Ritual Drama.” In Culture and Morality: Essays in Honour of Christoph von Fürer-Haimendorf, edited by Adrian C. Mayer, 239–61. Delhi: Oxford University Press, 1981.
- “Widows and Goddesses: Female Roles in Deity Symbolism in a South Indian Village.” Contributions to Indian Sociology (New Series). 13 (1979): 1–31.
- “Caste in a coastal village, Andhra Pradesh,” in Peoples of the Earth, volume twelve, The Indian Subcontinent including Ceylon, series edited by Edward E. Evans-Pritchard, volume edited by Christoph von Fürer-Haimendorf, 46–53, Danbury Press, division of Grolier Enterprises, copyright 1973 by Europa Verlag.

== See also ==
- Culture of Andhra Pradesh
