= FMW World Street Fight 8-Man Tag Team Championship =

Professional wrestling 8 man tag team championship

The FMW World Street Fight 8-Man Tag Team Championship is a championship in Frontier Martial-Arts Wrestling. It replaced the FMW World Street Fight 6-Man Tag Team Championship in October 2016. The first champions were determined on November 24, 2016, at Korakuen Hall in Tokyo.

== Title history ==
| No. | Champion | Reign | Date | Days held | Location | Event | Notes | Ref. |
|---|---|---|---|---|---|---|---|---|
| 1 | Tiger Clan (Great Tiger, Tiger Mask III, Black Tiger V, and Black Tiger VII) | 1 | November 24, 2016 | 3,024+ | Tokyo, Japan | | Defeated Atsushi Onita, Raijin Yaguchi, Hideki Hosaka and Hi69 in a decision match to determine the inaugural champions. | |
