= Tapper (surname) =

Tapper is a surname. Notable people with the surname include:

- Bertha Tapper (1859–1915), composer
- Brad Tapper (born 1978), Canadian ice hockey player
- Bruce Elliot Tapper (born ?), American anthropologist
- Charles Tapper (born 1993), American football player
- George Tapper (1916–1986), American politician
- Jake Tapper (born 1969), American journalist
- Kain Tapper (1930–2004), Finnish sculptor
- Michael Tapper (born ?), American drummer
- Richard Tapper (swimmer) (born 1968), New Zealand freestyle swimmer
- Richard Tapper (21st century), English anthropologist
- Staffan Tapper (born 1948), Swedish footballer
- Thomas Tapper (1864–1958), author and composer
- Walter Tapper (1861–1935), British architect
- Zoe Tapper (born 1981), English actress
