= Taper insertion pin =

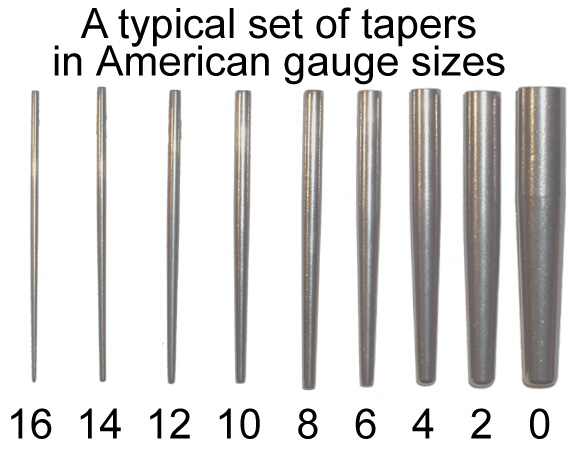
A set of tapers, tools used to stretch a piercing

A taper insertion pin, also known as a taper, is a tool used for enlarging holes for body modification purposes.

It consists of a long metal rod with one end having a slightly larger diameter than the other. Tapers are generally used for expanding piercings in order to accommodate larger plugs. Even at smaller gauges, tapers are not meant to be worn as jewellery, and are typically used for assisting in the placement of rings or plugs. Tapers are commonly used to prevent tissue damage.

Most tapers are constructed from surgical stainless steel, but can also be found in acrylic, titanium or polished stone. Most of these items are also sold with o-rings, which are small rubber bands to help keep piercings in place.
