= Brady Hicks =

American journalist (born 1978)

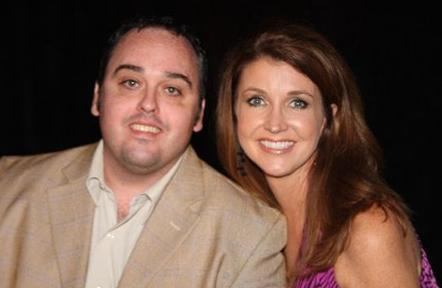
Brady Hicks at a media event with TNA president Dixie Carter.

Brady Hicks is a Philadelphia area journalist, radio personality, blogger, columnist, wrestling reporter, professional wrestling manager, play-by-play commentator, color analyst, and Pro Wrestling Illustrated contributing writer.

Over the years, Hicks has penned thousands of columns, features, and news stories, and starred in weekly radio programs and podcasts such as his own IN THE ROOM program, formerly of WEXP Philly, VOC Nation, formerly of WNJC, the DimpleDate Dating and Relationship Advice show, Jay V Mail, and About 12 Minutes.

== Early years ==
Hicks was raised in suburban Philadelphia and attended La Salle University, where he gained recognition for his syndicated online wrestling columns, and time spent as head booker for his own subscriber-based e-mail wrestling league. As Hicks has stated on his show, this group had more than 500 subscribers at one time. Brady was also an avid reader of PWI "Apter Mags" growing up, and has credited Bill Apter himself was his biggest inspiration in his podcasts, as he often claimed during broadcasts of IN THE ROOM.

Hicks would go on to write and edit for several publishers and area newspapers, including weekly newspapers under the Journal Register Company banner, and Metblogs-sponsored sites. During this time, Brady - serving in his capacity as a blogger - attempted to use only Six Degrees of Separation to acquire an interview with then-WTXF-TV Fox 29 traffic reporter Dorothy Krysiuk, now of WCVB-TV ABC 5 in Boston, a challenge somewhat modeled after film My Date With Drew. After catching the attention of Philadelphia Weekly, Hicks would succeed in his goal.

In 2005, while on assignment with the Northeast News Gleaner in Philadelphia, Hicks met and interviewed former WWE wrestler Shawn Michaels for a cover story for the now-defunct newspaper. It was this interview (Michaels was the recipient of a Christian service award from Holy Family University) that inspired Hicks to become more active in wrestling journalism.

== Wrestling journalism ==
Hicks is a contributing writer for Pro Wrestling Illustrated, and is a former staff member of The Wrestling Press and featured columnist for prowrestling.com and other websites. His work can also be found periodically on 1wrestling.com.

Brady is currently the play-by-play commentator for both the East Coast Wrestling Association and New Moon Rising Wrestling and several other independent promotions. Brady is also the former color commentator for the Tri-State Wrestling Alliance and a number of other Philadelphia-area independent promotions, including their respective radio broadcasts and DVD releases, hosts Go Fight Live's pre-iPPV media conferences, and has done work with Kayfabe Commentaries, including the 2010 DVD release of a shoot interview with TNA owner Dixie Carter and the 2012 DVD release of a shoot interview with former WWE, WCW, and TNA creative writer Vince Russo, for which Hicks served on the media panel.

Hicks is also a former supporting cast member of the VOC Wrestling Nation radio program, on WNJC in Philadelphia, lending his expertise on a variety of wrestling-related topics.

== Managing career ==
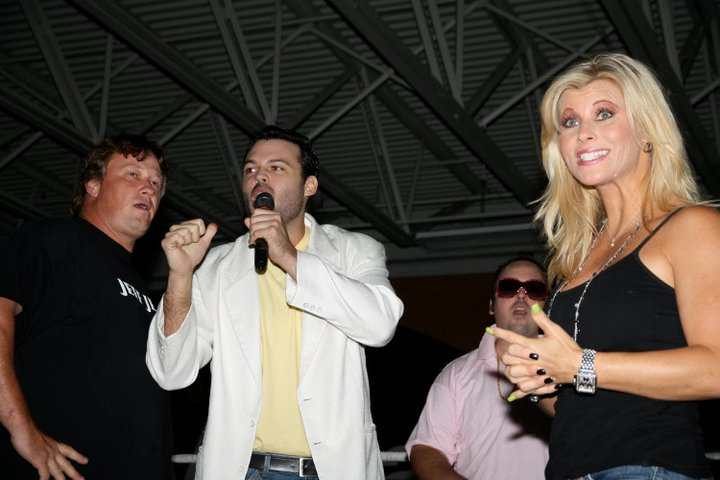
Brady Hicks, with Reckage & Romance, confronts Stacy Carter.

In 2010, Hicks seconded the team of "Reckage & Romance," VH1 Megan Wants a Millionaire reality star Matt Riviera and Jeff Jett against former multiple-time WWF tag team champions Demolition (with Stacy Carter), for a Tri-State Wrestling Alliance show in Voorhees, New Jersey. Even though Riviera and Jett would fall short in their bid to defeat Demolition, their match earned the three of them placement on the cover of the TWA's DVD release for this show.

Hicks also managed former Combat Zone Wrestling champions "The Best Around" Bruce Maxwell and TJ Cannon helping them defeat former ECW star The Blue Meanie and his tag team partner Kid America. In 2011, he began accompanying his legit wrestler cousin, El Mascara Amarilla, to the ring for matches in various independents.

== IN THE ROOM ==
In early 2009, Hicks took over hosting duties for the PWI Weekly podcast, which he renamed IN THE ROOM. Originally, this program aired exclusively for Who's Slamming Who, however, Hicks would soon begin to syndicate the show on wrestling news sites and his own website, before also taking the show to terrestrial radio on WEXP Philadelphia.

Hicks quickly emerged as one of the more popular personalities on Who's Slamming Who, especially as the program began to feature interviews with high-profile guests such as AJ Styles, Kurt Angle, Tammy Sytch, Don West, Jake Roberts, Madison Rayne, Serena Deeb, Kevin Thorn, Jamie Dundee, Nick Dinsmore, Luke Gallows, Justin Credible, Jimmy Snuka, Al Snow, and Austin Aries, among others. He remains friends with former co-hosts DJ and fellow PWI writer Kevin McElvaney. Hicks' PWI colleague Mike Bessler also contributes from time to time. Currently the show features former World Championship Wrestling wrestler The Stro as a cohost.

== Controversial AJ Interviews ==
In 2010, Hicks' 60-minute sitdown interview with TNA star AJ Styles gained a lot of recognition, given the controversial nature of many of Styles' comments, particularly in regards to his TNA title loss to Rob Van Dam and the manner in which the company had treated him. The interview would get Styles in hot water with TNA officials.

Hicks would go on to have Styles on his show several times, once even going so far as to call Ric Flair a "douchebag."

== Personal life ==
Brady Hicks is a native of Philadelphia, and an avid fan of the National Football League's Philadelphia Eagles. This frequently puts him at odds with former and current In The Room cohosts such as DJ and Derrick, both fans of the Eagles' rival New York Giants team. This has resulted in much banter and a good bit of trash talking.

His cousin is Peruvian luchadore El Mascara Amarilla ("The Yellow Mask"), who now competes in independents throughout the Northeast portion of the US.
