= WWBZ =

WWBZ may refer to:

- WWBZ-LP, a low-power radio station (102.5 FM) licensed to serve Hyden, Kentucky, United States
- WQVD, a radio station (700 AM) licensed to Orange–Athol, Massachusetts, United States, which used the call sign WWBZ from April to September 2014
- WTMZ-FM, a radio station (98.9 FM) licensed to McClellanville, South Carolina, United States, which used the call sign WWBZ from 1994 to 2004
- WKSC-FM, a radio station (103.5 FM) licensed to Chicago, Illinois, United States which used the call sign WWBZ from 1991 to 1994
- WNJC, a radio station (1360 AM) licensed to Washington Township, New Jersey, United States, which used the call sign WWBZ from 1948 to 1990 while licensed to nearby Vineland

== See also ==
- WBZ (disambiguation)
