= WXLV =

WXLV may refer to:

- WXLV-TV, a television station (channel 45) licensed to serve Winston-Salem, North Carolina, United States, 1995 to date
- WLHI, a radio station (90.3 FM) licensed to serve Schnecksville, Pennsylvania, United States, which held the call sign WXLV from 1983 to 2013
- WXLV The X is a college radio station of Lehigh Carbon Community College - WXLV Digital Media and Production Lab, Schnecksville, Pennsylvania, which broadcasts on iHeartRadio.
