= Armageddon (1999) =

World Wrestling Federation pay-per-view event

- Promotional poster showing The Undertaker (who neither competed on the card nor appeared at the event).
- Promotion: World Wrestling Federation
- Date: December 12, 1999
- City: Sunrise, Florida
- Venue: National Car Rental Center
- Attendance: 17,054
- Buy rate: 337,000
- Tagline: The End Is Here

Pay-per-view chronology
← Previous; Survivor Series	Next → Royal Rumble

Armageddon chronology
← Previous; First	Next → 2000

The 1999 Armageddon was a professional wrestling pay-per-view (PPV) event produced by the World Wrestling Federation (WWF, renamed WWE in 2002). It was the inaugural Armageddon and took place on December 12, 1999, at the National Car Rental Center in the Fort Lauderdale suburb of Sunrise, Florida.

The main event was a No Holds Barred match between Triple H and Vince McMahon. Triple H won the match by pinning Vince after hitting him with a sledgehammer, when Vince's daughter and Triple H's (kayfabe, at that time) wife Stephanie McMahon turned on Vince by giving the sledgehammer to Triple H.

On the undercard, Big Show squared off against Big Boss Man for the WWF Championship, The New Age Outlaws (Billy Gunn and Road Dogg) wrestled Rock 'n' Sock Connection (The Rock and Mankind) for the WWF Tag Team Championship, Chyna met Chris Jericho for the WWF Intercontinental Championship, Kane fought X-Pac in a Steel Cage match, and British Bulldog, Val Venis, and D'Lo Brown competed for the WWF European Championship in a triple threat match.

== Production ==
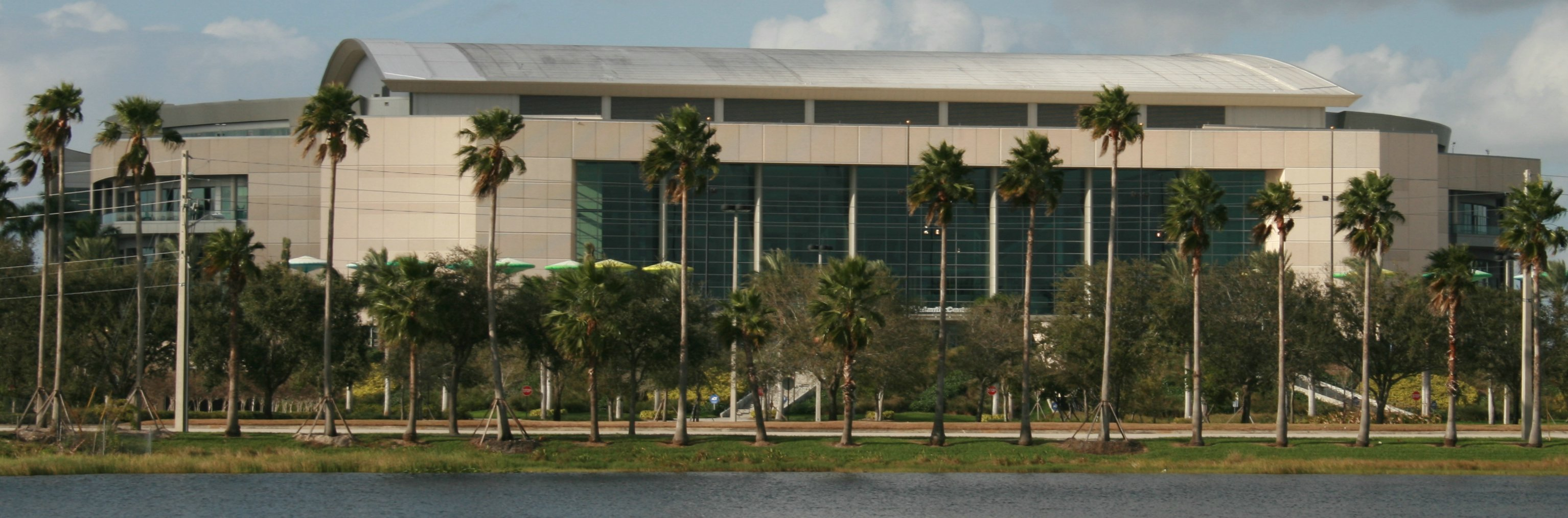
The inaugural Armageddon was held at the National Car Rental Center in the Fort Lauderdale suburb of Sunrise, Florida.

=== Background ===
From May 1995 to February 1999, the professional wrestling company World Wrestling Federation (WWF, renamed WWE in 2002) ran a series of pay-per-view (PPV) events titled In Your House. They aired when the promotion was not holding one of its then-five major PPVs (WrestleMania, King of the Ring, SummerSlam, Survivor Series, and Royal Rumble) and were sold at a lower cost. Following St. Valentine's Day Massacre: In Your House in February 1999, the In Your House branding was retired to give each monthly PPV a permanent identity. Later that year, Armageddon was established as the promotion's December PPV. This first Armageddon was scheduled to be held on December 12, 1999, at the National Car Rental Center in Sunrise, a suburb of Fort Lauderdale, Florida.

=== Storylines ===
The main rivalry heading into the event was between Triple H and the WWF Chairman Vince McMahon, his boss and father-in-law. At Survivor Series, Triple H was scheduled to defend the WWF Championship against "Stone Cold" Steve Austin and The Rock in a Triple Threat match. During the event, he interrupted an interview of The Rock, which resulted in a brawl between the two that was separated by several WWF referees. Later that event, Triple H did the same by interrupting an interview of Austin. However, Austin ran after Triple H throughout the backstage area of the arena until he was run down with a car in the parking lot of the arena. As a result, he was taken away in an ambulance and was removed from the main event. McMahon blamed Triple H and D-Generation X (DX) for the attack but Triple H denied doing so. Later that night, Big Show was added as the third competitor against Triple H and The Rock. McMahon interfered in the match and cost Triple H the WWF Championship against Big Show. On the November 15 edition of Raw is War, McMahon blamed Triple H and DX again for the attack but DX instead blamed the entire situation on McMahon. On the November 18 edition of SmackDown!, DX assaulted McMahon's Corporate Stooges (Pat Patterson and Gerald Brisco). Sgt. Slaughter informed McMahon of the attack and told McMahon that Triple H had invited him to the DX locker room. McMahon went to the locker room, where Triple H warned McMahon, not to make this personal. Later that night, Triple H came down to the ring and blamed McMahon for his title loss at Survivor Series and then challenged McMahon to a match at Armageddon. Shortly after, a footage was shown of backstage where the McMahon family had fallen down the stairs. On the November 22 edition of Raw is War, McMahon destroyed a limousine carrying DX through his car. Although DX retreated, the limousine was destroyed. Later that night, the police officers arrested McMahon for assaulting DX. Triple H attacked the handcuffed McMahon. Later that night, Triple H came down to the ring and accused McMahon of attacking Austin at Survivor Series. However, Shane McMahon came out to defend his father and informed Triple H that McMahon would accept Triple H's challenge at Armageddon. On the November 29 edition of Raw is War, a storyline wedding was scheduled to occur between McMahon's daughter Stephanie McMahon and Test. However, Triple H interrupted it by showing a video, in which he had married a drunk Stephanie in a wedding car. Test and McMahon then ran after Triple H to attack him. On the December 2 edition of SmackDown!, Triple H announced that he would wrestle McMahon in a No Holds Barred match. On the December 6 edition of Raw is War, Triple H suggested a stipulation into the match that if McMahon won the match, Triple H and Stephanie's marriage would be annulled but if Triple H won, he would be granted a WWF Championship match. McMahon agreed to the stipulation.

Another predominant rivalry heading into the event was between Big Show and Big Boss Man. Their rivalry was stemming back from in October, where Boss Man targeted the Big Show after his dad died, like stealing his dads casket, getting evidence Big Show is a bastard from his mom, breaking his heritage loom, etc., in Survivor Series, Big Show defeated Boss Man and his team of Prince Albert, Viscera and Mideon in a one-on-four Survivor Series elimination match. Later that night, Big Show replaced an injured "Stone Cold" Steve Austin in a Triple Threat match for the WWF Championship against then champion Triple H and The Rock. Big Show pinned Triple H to win the WWF Championship. On the November 15 edition of Raw is War, Big Boss Man became the #1 contender for the WWF Championship at Armageddon, by defeating The Rock in a Hardcore match.

On the November 22 edition of Raw is War, The Rock was scheduled to wrestle Big Boss Man and Prince Albert in a tag team match with a partner of his choosing. He chose the audience to be his partner, making it a Handicap match. He was dominated throughout the match until Rock's former Rock 'n' Sock Connection partner Mankind came out to help him as his partner, reuniting Rock 'n' Sock Connection. The reunited team defeated Boss Man and Albert. On the November 25 edition of SmackDown!, Rock 'n' Sock Connection defeated The Holly Cousins (Hardcore Holly and Crash Holly) to become the #1 contenders for the WWF Tag Team Championship, being held by New Age Outlaws (Mr. Ass and Road Dogg) at Armageddon.

At Survivor Series, Chyna defeated Chris Jericho to retain the WWF Intercontinental Championship. On the November 15 edition of Raw is War, Chyna and her manager Miss Kitty distracted Jericho during a match against Gangrel, allowing Gangrel to win the match. On the November 25 edition of SmackDown!, Chyna and Kitty cost Jericho another match, this time against Big Show for the WWF Championship. On the November 29 edition of Raw is War, a match was made between the two for the Intercontinental Championship when Jericho challenged Chyna for the title at Armageddon.

On the November 20 edition of Jakked, the recently debuted Rikishi defeated Crash Holly in a standard wrestling match, starting a rivalry between Rikishi and the Holly Cousins. On the December 12 edition of Sunday Night Heat, Viscera became Rikishi's partner after aiding him in his brawl with Holly Cousins, leading to a tag team match between Holly Cousins and the makeshift team of Rikishi and Viscera.

At Survivor Series, Kane defeated X-Pac by disqualification after X-Pac's D-Generation X teammates interfered in the match and attacked Kane. On the November 29 edition of Raw is War, X-Pac interfered in a tag team match pitting Kane and Big Show against Big Boss Man and Viscera. X-Pac cost Kane, the match by attacking him with a Chair Shot. After the match, X-Pac also attacked Kane's manager Tori. Later that night, X-Pac teamed up with New Age Outlaws to wrestle Rock 'n' Sock Connection and their mystery partner in a six-man tag team match. Kane was revealed to be their partner. The match ended when Al Snow interfered and attacked DX, getting Rock 'n' Sock and Kane disqualified. On the December 2 edition of SmackDown!, Kane lost to Viscera by countout after being distracted by X-Pac. This led to a Steel Cage match between Kane and X-Pac at Armageddon.

At Survivor Series, Val Venis and his team of Steve Blackman, Gangrel and Mark Henry defeated British Bulldog and his team of Mean Street Posse (Pete Gas, Joey Abs and Rodney) in a Survivor Series elimination match. On the November 25 edition of SmackDown!, Bulldog defended the WWF European Championship against Venis and retained the title by getting disqualified. On the November 29 edition of Raw is War, Bulldog interfered in a match between Venis and Kurt Angle, costing Venis, the match. On the December 2 edition of SmackDown!, Bulldog defended the European Championship against D'Lo Brown. During the match, it was announced that Bulldog would defend the title against Venis at Armageddon. Venis interfered in the match and attacked Bulldog, prompting Brown to attack Venis. As a result, all the three wrestlers began attacking each other. As a result, on the December 6 edition of Raw is War, Venis wrestled Brown to determine the #1 contender for the title at Armageddon. However, the match resulted in a no contest after Bulldog and Mean Street Posse attacked both Venis and Brown. As a result, Venis and Brown were both made the contenders for the European Championship at Armageddon, making it a Triple Threat match.

At Survivor Series, Kurt Angle made his WWF in-ring debut with a victory against Shawn Stasiak. Angle began an undefeated streak by continuing to win matches against opponents including The Godfather, Gangrel, Mark Henry, D'Lo Brown and Val Venis. On the December 2 edition of SmackDown!, it was announced that Angle would wrestle Steve Blackman in a standard wrestling match at Armageddon.

At Survivor Series, The Fabulous Moolah, Mae Young, Debra and Tori defeated Ivory, Luna, Jacqueline and Terri Runnels in an eight-woman tag team match. On the November 18 edition of SmackDown!, Ivory defeated Jacqueline and Luna in a Triple Threat Hardcore match to retain the WWF Women's Championship. On the November 25 edition of SmackDown!, Jacqueline defeated Ivory in a non-title first-ever Gravy Bowl match, with Miss Kitty serving as the special guest referee. As a result of winning, Jacqueline won the Golden Ladle Trophy. This angered Ivory and she attacked Kitty. An EMT came out to help Kitty but was attacked by Ivory too. On the November 29 edition of Raw is War, the EMT was introduced by Michael Cole as Barbara Bush (B.B). She challenged Ivory to an Evening Gown match for the Women's Championship at Armageddon. Ivory responded by ripping off B.B's shirt. On the December 6 edition of Raw is War, it was announced that Ivory would defend the Women's Championship against BB, Jacqueline and Miss Kitty in a Four Corners Evening Gown Pool match at Armageddon.

== Event ==
Other on-screen personnel
Role:	Name:
English commentators	Jim Ross
English commentators	Jerry Lawler
Spanish commentators	Carlos Cabrera
Spanish commentators	Hugo Savinovich
Interviewers	Michael Cole
Interviewers	Kevin Kelly
Interviewers	Lilian Garcia
Ring announcer	Howard Finkel
Referees	Mike Chioda
Referees	Earl Hebner
Referees	Jim Korderas
Referees	Tim White
Referees	Theodore Long

Before the event aired live on pay-per-view, Al Snow defeated Test by pinning him in a match that aired live on Sunday Night Heat.

=== Preliminary matches ===
As the event concluded, the first match that aired was a tag team battle royal, with the winning team earning a WWF Tag Team Championship match at Royal Rumble. The participating teams in the match were The Acolytes (Bradshaw and Faarooq), The Godfather and Mark Henry, The Headbangers (Mosh and Thrasher), Edge and Christian, The Hardy Boyz (Matt Hardy and Jeff Hardy), The Dudley Boyz (Bubba Ray Dudley and D-Von Dudley), Mean Street Posse (Pete Gas and Rodney), and Too Cool (Grand Master Sexay and Scotty 2 Hotty). Before the match started, Dudley Boyz briefly brawled with Edge and Christian. As the match started, Mean Street Posse's third member Joey Abs interfered in the match to help his teammates, but Rodney and Abs were eliminated but the referee did not notice it. However, despite that, Mean Street Posse was the first team to get eliminated when Faarooq tossed Pete Gas over the top rope. The Headbangers were next to be eliminated when Godfather backdropped Mosh over the top rope. The Acolytes then eliminated Mark Henry, causing Godfather and Henry to get eliminated from the match. Christian went on to eliminate both members of Too Cool. Edge and Christian were the next team eliminated when D-Von pulled Edge from the apron. Dudley Boyz were next to be eliminated when Matt eliminated D-Von. The match continued until Matt and Bradshaw eliminated each other. However, the match continued as Jeff eliminated Faarooq by performing a Headscissor Throw but the referee did not notice it. As a result, the match continued. Faarooq took advantage and eliminated Jeff. As a result, APA won the battle royal and would earn the title shot at the Royal Rumble.

The second match was between Kurt Angle and Steve Blackman. After a back and forth action, Angle won the match by pinning Blackman after avoiding an Enzuigiri by Blackman and performing a Bridging Belly to Back Suplex. However, after the match, Blackman attacked Angle with his nunchuks.

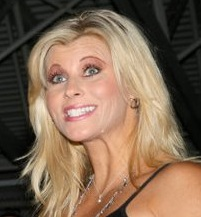
Miss Kitty won the WWF Women's Championship in a four corners evening gown pool match. After the match, she stripped out of her dress in celebration and quickly flashed the crowd her breasts. This was the first instance of unscripted intentional nudity in the World Wrestling Federation.

The third match was a four corners evening gown pool match for the WWF Women's Championship. Ivory defended the title against Miss Kitty, Jacqueline and B.B.. The Fabulous Moolah and Mae Young served as the special guest referees. Jacqueline was the first participant to be eliminated when Ivory stripped her. B.B. was next to be eliminated when Ivory and Kitty both stripped her. Kitty then stripped Ivory to win the match and thus became the new Women's Champion. After the match, Kitty took off her dress, so she was in her bra and panties, and jumped into the pool. She climbed back onto the stage and flashed the crowd in celebration before Sgt. Slaughter and Tony Garea covered her up and escorted her backstage.

The fourth match was a tag team match pitting The Holly Cousins (Hardcore Holly and Crash Holly) against Rikishi and Viscera. After a back and forth action, Viscera accidentally performed a Spinning Heel Kick on Rikishi. Hardcore took advantage and pinned Rikishi to win the match. After the match ended, Rikishi argued with Viscera and confronted him for costing him the match. Rikishi proceeded to perform a Savate Kick on Viscera. As a result, both of them brawled with each other until being broken apart by several WWF referees.

The fifth match was a Triple Threat match for the WWF European Championship. British Bulldog defended the title against Val Venis and D'Lo Brown. Before the match started, Bulldog was escorted to the ring by Mean Street Posse but the referee Teddy Long removed them from ringside and sent them backstage. All the three men battled each other throughout the match performing several maneuvers on each other. In the end, Brown performed a Lo Down on Bulldog and attempted to pin him. Venis climbed to the top rope and performed a Money Shot on both Brown and Bulldog. Venis then pinned Bulldog to win the match and thus became the new European Champion.

The sixth match was a Steel Cage match between Kane and X-Pac. X-Pac could win the match by pinfall or submission or escaping the cage, with both feet touching the floor. However, Kane could only win by pinfall or submission. X-Pac's D-Generation X teammates New Age Outlaws (Billy Gunn and Road Dogg) interfered in the match on X-Pac's behalf and tossed chairs into the ring for X-Pac to use it. X-Pac took advantage and dominated the match with this advantage. This caused Kane's valet Tori to interfere in the match. X-Pac performed an X-Factor on Tori. Kane eventually won the match by performing a Tombstone Piledriver on X-Pac.

=== Main event matches ===
The seventh match of the event was a standard wrestling match for the WWF Intercontinental Championship. Chyna defended the title against Chris Jericho. After a back and forth match, Jericho defeated Chyna by forcing her to submit to his submission maneuver, the Walls of Jericho. As a result, Jericho became the new Intercontinental Champion. After the match, Jericho was interviewed by Michael Cole backstage where Chyna showed her respect to Jericho by shaking his hand and called him the better wrestler for that night.

The eighth match was a tag team match for the WWF Tag Team Championship. New Age Outlaws defended the titles against Rock 'n' Sock Connection (The Rock and Mankind). In the earlier portion of the match, Al Snow interfered and attacked Mankind until Rock assaulted Snow. After chasing away Snow, Rock 'n' Sock continued to fight the Outlaws. Rock nearly won the titles when he performed a Rock Bottom on Billy Gunn. Rock attempted to pin Billy Gunn after the move but Snow interfered and broke the pinfall attempt. As a result, the New Age Outlaws were disqualified and Rock 'n' Sock won the match, but since a title could only change hands by pinfall or submission, the Outlaws retained the Tag Team Championship. After the match, an enraged Rock performed a Rock Bottom on Road Dogg and then hit Snow with a Rock Bottom and followed it by performing a People's Elbow on Snow.

The final match on the undercard was a standard wrestling match for the WWF Championship. The Big Show defended the title against the Big Boss Man. Big Show released all his anger out on The Big Boss Man, Boss Man's enforcer Prince Albert interfered on his behalf throughout the match, prompting Big Show to perform a Chokeslam on Albert through the Spanish announce table, Boss Man used that distraction to hit Show with a steel stair. Big Show defeated Boss Man to retain the WWF Championship by pinning Boss Man after chokeslamming him.

The main event was a No Holds Barred match between Triple H and Vince McMahon. Vince's legitimate daughter and Triple H's on-screen wife Stephanie McMahon was in the front row in the audience to see the match. The match stipulated that if Vince won, Triple H and Stephanie's marriage would be annulled but if Triple H won, he would receive a title shot at the WWF Championship. Mankind interfered in the match and helped Vince by appearing in the ringside area with a shopping cart full of weapons for Vince to use. This allowed Vince to dominate much of the match. One spot that took place in the event saw McMahon fall 30 feet into the trunk of a military Humvee stage prop. Triple H and McMahon eventually took their vicious battle into the parking lot just outside the arena, in which Triple H and McMahon utilized the numerous vehicles in the parking lot as weapons. In the closing moments of the match, Vince tried to assault Triple H with Triple H's own sledgehammer but Stephanie came out and stopped Vince from doing so. She decided to hit Triple H herself but she lost her courage to attack him. This allowed Triple H to grab the weapon and he attacked Vince with it to win the match. After the match, Triple H tried to attack Stephanie with it but then dropped the weapon and the two embraced in the ring, revealing that it was an entire plan by both of them to take over the WWF.

== Aftermath ==
On the December 13 edition of Raw is War, Triple H and Stephanie McMahon took over the show after Vince McMahon and his son Shane McMahon left the arena in their limousine and Triple H made all the matches of that night. As a result of Triple H and Stephanie's takeover, McMahon-Helmsley Era was born. Triple H and Stephanie continued to make matches of their own choice that were usually in favor of D-Generation X (DX). This continued on the December 16 edition of SmackDown! and on the December 20 edition of Raw is War. On the December 23 edition of SmackDown!, one of the victims of Triple H's match makings, Mick Foley's alter ego Mankind protested on these match makings and Stephanie decided that DX would not interfere in any match and only fair matches would be made and Triple H was suspended in a cage above the ring during the WWF Championship match between Big Show and Mankind. Triple H's cage was lowered down and along with his DX teammates, New Age Outlaws (Billy Gunn and Road Dogg), Triple H attacked Mankind. It was revealed to be a plan by Stephanie to punish Mankind on protesting. On the December 27 edition of Raw is War, Triple H forced Mankind to wrestle his Rock 'n' Sock Connection partner The Rock in a match, where the loser would leave the WWF. The Rock won the match. As a result, Mankind was fired from WWF in the storyline. On the January 3, 2000 edition of Raw is War, Triple H announced that he would wrestle Big Show for the WWF Championship. Later that night, Triple H defeated Big Show via interference by his DX teammate X-Pac for the WWF Championship. On the January 10, 2000 edition of Raw is War, The Rock and the entire WWF roster threatened to leave the WWF if Mick Foley was not reinstated. As a result, Triple H was forced to reinstate Foley. On the January 13, 2000 edition of SmackDown!, Triple H announced that he would defend the WWF Championship against Foley at the Royal Rumble. At the Royal Rumble, Triple H defeated Foley's alter ego, Cactus Jack in a Street Fight to retain the WWF Championship.

After defeating Chyna for the WWF Intercontinental Championship at Armageddon, Chris Jericho defended the title against her in a rematch on the December 30 edition of SmackDown!. Both competitors' shoulders were down to the mat. As a result, both of them were pinned. On the January 3, 2000 edition of Raw is War, Stephanie McMahon ruled that both Jericho and Chyna were co-holders of the title and announced that only one of them could defend the title at a time but if anyone of them lost the title, both of them would lose it. Shortly after, Hardcore Holly began pursuing the Intercontinental Championship but was defeated by Chyna in a title match. He would then team with his Holly Cousins partner Crash Holly in matches against Chyna and Jericho. On the January 20, 2000 edition of SmackDown!, it was announced that Chyna, Jericho and Hardcore would wrestle in a Triple Threat match to determine the sole holder of the Intercontinental Championship. At the Royal Rumble, Jericho defeated Chyna and Hardcore by pinning Chyna in a Triple Threat match to become the sole holder of the Intercontinental Championship.

The 1999 Armageddon would in turn be the first in the Armageddon PPV chronology, as a second event was held the following year. An event was not held in 2001 as it was replaced by Vengeance due to the September 11 attacks, but Armageddon was reinstated in 2002, after the promotion had been renamed to World Wrestling Entertainment (WWE) earlier that year. It continued until 2008, after which, Armageddon was discontinued and replaced by TLC: Tables, Ladders & Chairs in 2009.

== Reception ==
In 2017, Kevin Pantoja of 411Mania gave the event a rating of 2.0 [Very Bad], stating, "I just couldn’t get into this show at all. There was a part in the middle, where we got a good Cage match and a solid Intercontinental Title match, but everything else mostly fell flat. The opening battle [royale] was okay too. The Tag Title match lacked, the main event went far too long, Angle/Black was dull and the women’s stuff was mostly pointless. There was an awful tag match in the middle of the show and the WWF Title match showed exactly why the Big Show as champion was a bad move."

== Results ==
No.	Results	Stipulations	Times
1^{H}	Al Snow (with Head) defeated Test	Singles match	1:27
2	The Acolytes (Bradshaw and Faarooq) won by last eliminating The Hardy Boyz (Jeff Hardy and Matt Hardy) (Note: The other competitors were: The Godfather and Mark Henry, The Headbangers (Mosh and Thrasher), Edge and Christian, The Dudley Boyz (Bubba Ray Dudley and D-Von Dudley), Mean Street Posse (Pete Gas and Rodney), and Too Cool (Grand Master Sexay and Scotty 2 Hotty).)	Battle Royal to determine #1 contenders to the WWF Tag Team Championship at the Royal Rumble	10:57
3	Kurt Angle defeated Steve Blackman	Singles match	6:42
4	Miss Kitty defeated B.B., Ivory (c), and Jacqueline	Evening Gown pool match for the WWF Women's Championship; The Fabulous Moolah and Mae Young were the special guest referees.	2:53
5	The Hollys (Hardcore and Crash) defeated Rikishi and Viscera	Tag team match	4:23
6	Val Venis defeated The British Bulldog (c) and D'Lo Brown	Triple threat match for the WWF European Championship	9:15
7	Kane (with Tori) defeated X-Pac by pinfall	Steel Cage match X-Pac could win the match by pinfall, submission, or escaping the cage, with both feet touching the floor; however, Kane could only win by pinfall or submission.	9:00
8	Chris Jericho defeated Chyna (c) (with Miss Kitty)	Singles match for the WWF Intercontinental Championship	10:19
9	The Rock 'n' Sock Connection (The Rock and Mankind) defeated The New Age Outlaws (Billy Gunn and Road Dogg) (c) by disqualification	Tag team match for the WWF Tag Team Championship	16:00
10	Big Show (c) defeated Big Boss Man (with Prince Albert)	Singles match for the WWF Championship	3:00
11	Triple H defeated Mr. McMahon	No Holds Barred match Since Triple H won, he became the number one contender for the WWF Championship. Had McMahon won, Triple H and Stephanie McMahon would have been forced to annul their marriage.	29:45
(c) / – the champion(s) heading into the match; H / – the match was broadcast prior to the pay-per-view on Sunday Night Heat
