= Royal Rumble (2000) =

World Wrestling Federation pay-per-view event

- Promotional poster featuring Triple H, Cactus Jack, and various WWF wrestlers
- Promotion: World Wrestling Federation
- Date: January 23, 2000
- City: Manhattan, New York
- Venue: Madison Square Garden
- Attendance: 19,231
- Buy rate: 590,000
- Tagline: The Road to WrestleMania Begins

Pay-per-view chronology
← Previous; Armageddon	Next → No Way Out

Royal Rumble chronology
← Previous; 1999	Next → 2001

The 2000 Royal Rumble was a professional wrestling pay-per-view (PPV) event produced by the World Wrestling Federation (WWF, renamed WWE in 2002). It was the 13th annual Royal Rumble event, and the WWF's 100th PPV event overall, and it took place on January 23, 2000, from Madison Square Garden in the New York City borough of Manhattan, New York. The event was based around the men's Royal Rumble match, a modified 30-man battle royal in which the participants enter at timed intervals instead of all beginning in the ring at the same time and the winner received a WWF Championship match at WrestleMania 2000.

Six matches were contested on the event's card. The main event was the 2000 Royal Rumble match, which The Rock won by last eliminating Big Show. The undercard included a Street Fight between Triple H and Cactus Jack for the WWF Championship which Triple H won to retain the title. Also on the undercard, co-WWF Intercontinental Champion Chris Jericho defeated co-champion Chyna and Hardcore Holly in a triple threat match to become the undisputed champion.

This Royal Rumble was the WWF's first PPV event to air on terrestrial television in the United Kingdom, as Channel 4 had acquired the rights to broadcast the WWF's programming that year. The Royal Rumble aired live, with commercial breaks—a format that was changed for later PPVs on Channel 4. The event has been named as one of "the 15 best pay-per-views ever" by WWE, with the Street Fight being critically acclaimed among various reviewers.

== Production ==
=== Background ===
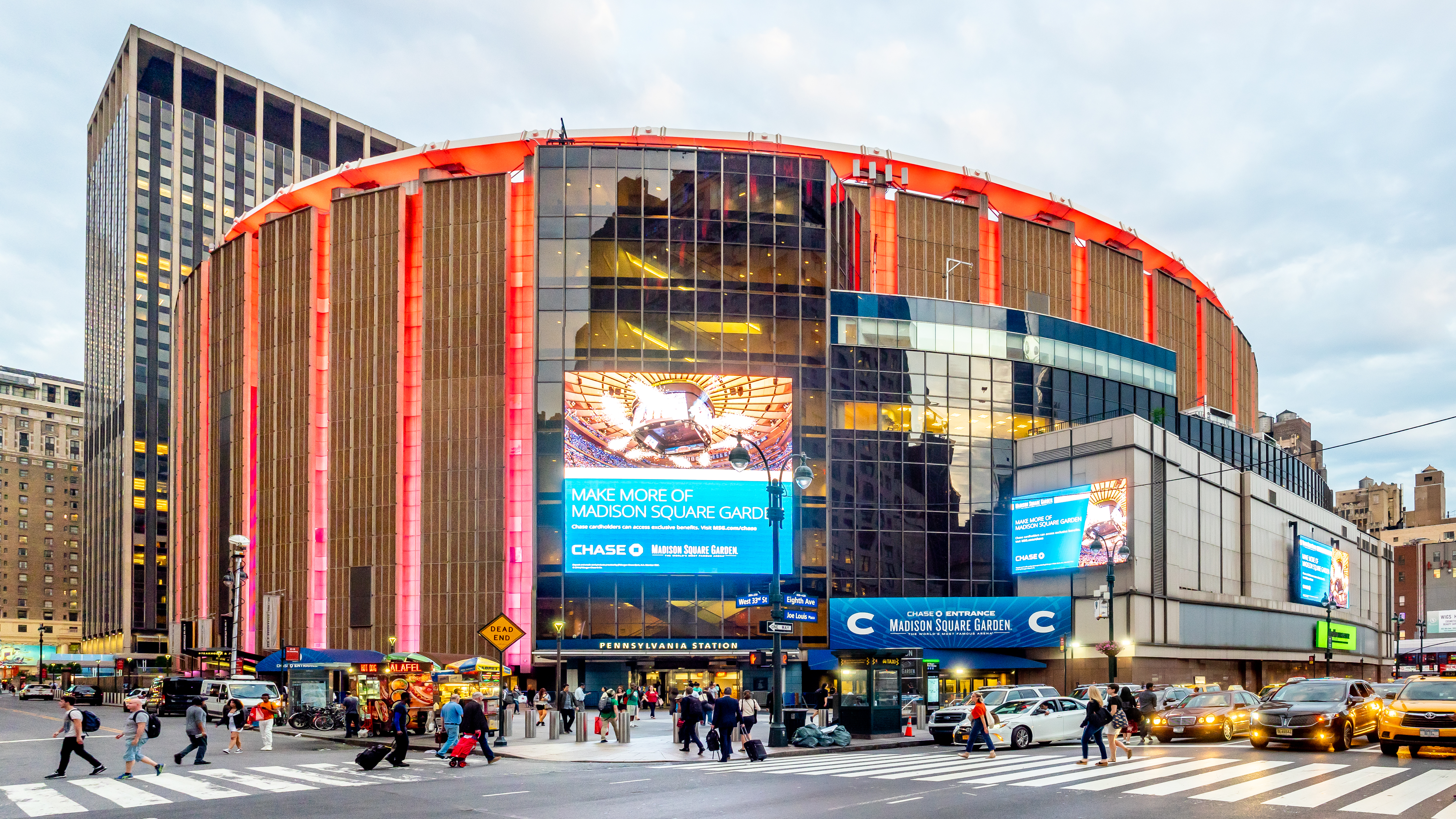
The 13th annual Royal Rumble event was held at Madison Square Garden in the New York City borough of Manhattan, New York.

The Royal Rumble is an annual professional wrestling event, produced every January by the World Wrestling Federation (WWF, renamed WWE in 2002) since 1988; that first event was a television special before it became an annual pay-per-view (PPV) beginning in 1989. It is one of the promotion's original four PPVs, along with WrestleMania, SummerSlam, and Survivor Series, referred to as the "Big Four", and was considered one of the "Big Five" PPVs with the addition of King of the Ring in 1993. It is named after and centered on the men's Royal Rumble match. The 13th Royal Rumble event was scheduled to be held on January 23, 2000, from Madison Square Garden in the New York City borough of Manhattan, New York.

The Royal Rumble match is a modified battle royal in which the participants enter at timed intervals instead of all beginning in the ring at the same time, and the match generally features 30 wrestlers. Since 1993, the winner earns a world championship match at that year's WrestleMania. For 2000, the winner earned a match for the WWF Championship at WrestleMania 2000.

=== Storylines ===
The event comprised six matches that resulted from scripted storylines. Results were predetermined by the WWF's writers, while storylines were produced on the WWF's weekly television shows, Raw and SmackDown!.

==== WWF Championship ====
The main feud going into the event was between Triple H and Mick Foley. At Armageddon the previous month, Stephanie McMahon turned on her father Vince during his match with Triple H, with whom he had been feuding and who (in storyline) had married Stephanie against her will in a drive-through wedding. Vince and his son, Shane McMahon, left the company the next night out of anger. This left Stephanie, who began referring to herself as Stephanie McMahon-Helmsley, in control and she and her husband formed the McMahon-Helmsley Era with Road Dogg, Billy Gunn, and X-Pac, where they set out to make life miserable for all of their enemies in the WWF.

Two of the biggest targets of the group were The Rock 'N' Sock Connection, the team of Mankind (Foley) and The Rock. Mankind was one of the most vocal of the objectors to what Triple H and Stephanie were doing, and in the December 27, 1999, episode of Raw is War, Triple H decided that the company was “not big enough” for the three of them and forced Mankind and The Rock to face each other in a Pink Slip on a Pole match later that evening. The Rock won the match, which meant that Mankind was fired from the company. Triple H then began featuring a Mankind impersonator (Dennis Knight) in an attempt to mock him; Foley would eventually confront and beat up the impostor on SmackDown! on January 6, 2000.

On the January 10 episode of Raw is War, The Rock brought every superstar to the ring, demanding that Foley be reinstated or the entire roster would walk out. Triple H, who had defeated The Big Show to regain the WWF Championship the week before, acquiesced and reinstated Foley, who promptly requested a Street Fight for the WWF Championship at Royal Rumble. Foley and Triple H fought in a four-on-four tag team match later that night. Triple H pinned Foley after using the ring bell, and delivering two Pedigrees. After the match, Foley took off his mask and attacked Triple H.

On the January 13 episode of SmackDown!, Triple H called out Foley again only to have the Mankind impersonator come out instead. When Foley did come out moments later, he revealed to Triple H that he had been thinking about what Mankind was and declared that “Mankind” was not ready to face him for the title at the Royal Rumble. Instead, he said the fans deserved a substitute; he then took off his mask and shirt and tie to reveal a black “Wanted Dead” shirt underneath and revealed to Triple H that, instead of taking on Mankind, he would be facing instead the much more brutal and violent Cactus Jack.

==== Royal Rumble Match/Rock vs. Big Show ====
Buildup towards the Royal Rumble match began on January 10, when The Rock announced his participation in the match and a week later guaranteed victory. Big Show, who had lost the WWF Championship the week before, also declared his intention to win the match.

Bad blood had begun to spread between the two several days earlier on SmackDown! when the two were involved in a tag team match where Big Show abandoned The Rock after claiming he did not think much of him. Later that night, The Rock and Big Show faced the New Age Outlaws. At the end, Big Show attacked The Rock, who then hit Big Show with a steel chair, and a People's Elbow. On the January 20 episode of SmackDown!, a confrontation between Big Show and The Rock was interrupted by Tori, who declared Kane the favorite, leading to a Triple Threat Over-the-Top-Rope Lumberjack match. In the match, Big Show eliminated The Rock with a chokeslam, and Kane eliminated Big Show with a back body drop to win, sparking a fight involving all the competitors and lumberjacks.

==== Intercontinental Championship ====
Another feud going into the event was between Chris Jericho, Chyna and Hardcore Holly over the WWF Intercontinental Championship. Chyna and Jericho had been feuding over the Intercontinental Championship for some time. After Chyna defeated Jeff Jarrett to win the title at No Mercy in October 1999, Jericho began challenging her for it. After coming up short at Survivor Series, Jericho dethroned Chyna at Armageddon. Chyna then began randomly assisting Jericho in his title defenses, claiming that she wanted to ensure he remained champion so she could take the title back from him.

On the December 30 episode of SmackDown! Chyna and Jericho wrestled a match that ended in a double pin. Instead of declaring the match a draw and keeping the belt with Jericho, Stephanie McMahon-Helmsley declared Jericho and Chyna to be co-Intercontinental Champions. This meant that both Chyna and Jericho would defend the belt, albeit separately, and if one of them lost a title defense both of them lost the title.

Since neither Chyna nor Jericho wanted to be the one to lose the title, both wrestlers began interfering in each other's matches to make sure they held onto the Intercontinental Championship until a match to settle the dispute could be signed. This ended up drawing Hardcore Holly into the mix, as he challenged both wrestlers for the title only to come up short each time. Holly eventually challenged the co-champions to a match at the Royal Rumble, and a triple threat title match was signed.

== Event ==
Other on-screen personnel
Role:	Name:
English commentators	Jim Ross
English commentators	Jerry Lawler
Spanish commentatorsist	Carlos Cabrera
Spanish commentatorsist	Hugo Savinovich
Interviewers	Jonathan Coachman
Interviewers	Michael Cole
Ring announcer	Howard Finkel
WWF New York	Linda McMahon
Referees	Jack Doan
Referees	Earl Hebner
Referees	Jim Korderas
Referees	Theodore Long
Referees	Chad Patton
Referees	Mike Sparks
Referees	Tim White

=== Sunday Night Heat ===
The pay-per-view was preceded by an episode of Sunday Night Heat, which aired live on USA Network and included backstage interviews from Madison Square Garden as well as several participants drawing their entry numbers for the Royal Rumble match. An upset Kaientai and The Mean Street Posse were shown backstage not being able to draw numbers because they were denied entry into the Rumble match. The Big Show also did a live in-ring promo talking about his entry in the Rumble match.

=== Preliminary matches ===
The first match of the event was between Kurt Angle and an unannounced opponent. Before the match, Angle spoke to the audience, putting down the New York Knicks, and his opponent. Tazz then made his WWF debut as Angle's opponent. Tazz gained the early advantage, performing a back body drop, sending Angle outside the ring. Angle gained the advantage after performing a vertical suplex outside the ring. After performing a belly to belly suplex, Angle climbed the turnbuckles, but Tazz hit the ropes. Angle fell onto the top turnbuckle, and Tazz performed a belly to belly suplex off the turnbuckles. Angle regained the advantage after a small package, and a bridging German suplex. Tazz then countered an Olympic slam into a German suplex. After a T-Bone suplex and a Head and arm suplex, Tazz applied the Tazzmission. Angle passed out and Tazz won the match, ending Angle's undefeated streak.

The second match was WWF's first-ever Tag Team Tables match, between the Hardy Boyz (Matt Hardy and Jeff Hardy) and the Dudley Boyz (Bubba Ray Dudley and D-Von Dudley). Before the match, the Dudley Boyz set up their heel status and insulted the fans (which ironically, the Dudley Boyz are both from New York City), expressing their dislike for the booing of John Rocker, the Atlanta Braves closer, which had defeated the hometown New York Mets 4–2 in the National League Championship Series two months earlier and trashed New York City and its people in what was a heated second-round playoff series. This Tables match was different in that instead of one person having to go through a table to win the match, both members from the same team had to go through a table. The Hardy Boyz gained the advantage with a double superplex to Bubba Ray, and the use of a ladder. After using the chair, Matt placed Bubba Ray on a table outside the ring. Matt then performed a diving leg drop as Jeff performed a diving splash (known as the Event Omega) on Bubba Ray through the table. The Hardy Boyz then placed D-Von on a table outside the ring. Matt attempted a diving leg drop through the table, but D-Von avoided it. Jeff then attempted a suicide senton, but missed, sending himself into a table. Bubba Ray performed a superbomb through a table on Matt. The Dudley Boyz then beat down the Hardy Boyz, and stacked tables in the entrance way under a balcony in the seating area. Bubba Ray dragged Jeff to the balcony, but Jeff performed a low blow, and used a chair on Bubba Ray. Matt moved as Bubba Ray fell through the tables. Matt then placed D-Von onto a table, and Jeff sent him through it with a Swanton Bomb from the balcony for the Hardy Boyz to win the match, which ultimately turned out to be a violent and brutal affair- it featured no less than twelve total steel chair shots to the head, including four to Bubba Ray Dudley.

Next was the Miss Rumble 2000 swimsuit contest. The contestants were Ivory, Terri, Jacqueline, Barbara Bush, Luna Vachon, and The Kat, while the judges consisted of comedian Andy Richter and WWF alumni Sgt. Slaughter, Tony Garea, Johnny Valiant, Freddie Blassie, and The Fabulous Moolah. The contestants showed their swimsuits, though Luna refused to take off her coat. As the judges were deciding, Mae Young appeared, and announced her participation in the contest. After showing her swimsuit, she flashed her breasts. The video was censored before Mark Henry covered her up. The judges then unanimously decided Young as the winner, unfortunately Young's actions would end up costing the WWF their deal with Channel 4 in the UK.

The third match was a Triple Threat match for the WWF Intercontinental Championship between Hardcore Holly, and co-champions Chris Jericho and Chyna. Before the match, Jericho declared his plans for a celebration after winning the match. The match went back and forth before Holly sent Chyna outside the ring. Jericho then fought with Holly, applying the Walls of Jericho. Chyna returned to the ring, and attacked Jericho. Jericho performed a springboard splash to Holly outside the ring. Back in the ring, Chyna performed a handspring back elbow, and a DDT to Jericho. Chyna attempted a pin, but Holly returned and threw her out of the ring. All three were outside the ring, and Holly attempted to use a chair, but Chyna performed a dropkick to the chair into Holly's face. In the ring, Chyna performed a diving splash onto Holly, and Jericho performed a diving splash onto both of them. Chyna countered a belly to back suplex, and performed a low blow to Jericho. Chyna then performed a Pedigree to Holly. Jericho performed a diving crossbody to Chyna, who was on Holly's shoulders. Chyna performed a superplex to Holly, hit him with a chair, and applied the Walls of Jericho. Jericho then performed a one-handed bulldog, and a Lionsault to Chyna, to pin her for the victory. Jericho gained sole possession of the title as a result.

The fourth match was between the New Age Outlaws (Road Dogg and Billy Gunn) and The Acolytes (Faarooq and Bradshaw) for the WWF Tag Team Championship. Before the match, the New Age Outlaws delivered their signature speech to the audience. The Acolytes gained the early advantage after a fallaway slam from Bradshaw to Gunn. After avoiding an attack in the corner, Bradshaw performed the Clothesline from Hell on Gunn. Faarooq then executed a spinebuster on Dogg. As Faarooq attempted a pin, Gunn pulled the referee outside the ring, and Bradshaw knocked down both Gunn and the referee. After The Acolytes performed an aided powerbomb on Dogg, X-Pac came down to interfere, and performed a spinning heel kick on Bradshaw. Gunn then pinned Bradshaw after a Fameasser to retain the title.

The fifth match was between Triple H and Cactus Jack in a violent and brutal Street Fight for the WWF Championship. Jack gained the early advantage after repeated punches, and they fought outside the ring, where Triple H hit Jack with the ring bell. Triple H then hit Jack with a chair, but Jack got up, and performed a leg drop with the chair. The fight continued into the audience, with Jack performing a suplex onto pallets (which The Game would sustain a horrific wound to the back of his left leg), and using a trash can. Triple H performed a belly to back suplex, but Jack came back with a running knee lift into the steel steps. Jack attempted to use a barbed wire two-by-four, but Triple H performed a low blow, and used the weapon on Jack. Jack came back, hit Triple H's groin with the weapon, and performed a double arm DDT. Jack attacked Triple H's head repeatedly with the weapon. Jack attempted a back to belly piledriver through the announce table, but Triple H countered with a back body drop. Jack countered a Pedigree attempt and performed a bulldog onto the two-by-four. Triple H performed a hip toss into the steps, and targeted Jack's knees, using the two-by-four. Triple H then handcuffed Jack but as he tried to use the steel steps, Jack performed a drop toe hold, sending Triple H's head into the steps. Triple H came back by using the chair. The Rock came out, and struck Triple H with a chair, as a police officer removed Jack's handcuffs. Jack performed a pulling Texas piledriver on the announce table, and spilled a bag of thumbtacks in the ring. Triple H came back with a back body drop onto the thumbtacks, and a Pedigree for a near-fall. Frustrated, Triple H finally hit Jack with a second Pedigree onto the thumbtacks to win, and retain his title. Mick Foley has claimed that this final pedigree was not agreed with Vince McMahon prior to the event and was decided upon during the match itself. After the match, Triple H was lifted onto a stretcher but Jack caught up to the emergency staff as they left the ringside area, pushed Triple H on the stretcher back to the ring, and hit Triple H with the two-by-four again.

=== Main event ===
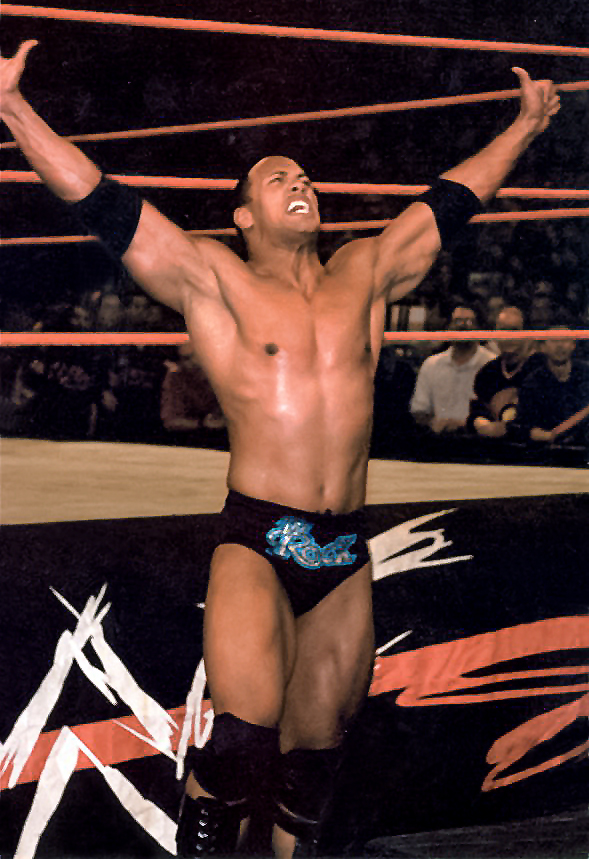
The Rock won the 2000 Royal Rumble match.

The main event was the Royal Rumble match. During the match, non-participants Kaientai (Funaki and Taka Michinoku) repeatedly and randomly entered the ring, and attacked the participants. They were thrown out soon after each time. Rikishi, the fifth entrant, dominated upon entering, and eliminated all except Grand Master Sexay. Scotty 2 Hotty entered next, and the three Too Cool members danced in the ring until Rikishi eliminated the other two, and continued to dance. Rikishi eliminated the first to eighth entrants. The Big Boss Man, the ninth entrant, refused to enter the ring until Test, the following entrant, threw him in. During Kaientai's second interference, Taka was injured when he was thrown out of the ring, and sent to the hospital. Funaki continued to interfere by himself. Bob Backlund made a surprise return at number 14. It took six men to eliminate Rikishi. Chris Jericho entered at number 15 and eliminated Backlund before leaving through the crowd. Chyna entered at number 17 and eliminated Jericho before being eliminated by Boss Man not long after. After Faarooq, the eighteenth entrant, entered, non-participants Mean Street Posse came out, and attacked Faarooq, helping The Big Boss Man eliminate him. Bradshaw, entering twenty-seventh, was attacked by the Mean Street Posse, and eliminated soon after. Faarooq came out and, with Bradshaw, fought with the Mean Street Posse backstage.

The final four participants in the Royal Rumble match were The Rock, Big Show, Kane, and X-Pac. The New Age Outlaws pulled Kane out of the ring, and attacked him. The Rock eliminated X-Pac, but the referees were preoccupied with Kane and did not witness this. X-Pac re-entered the match. Kane hit an enzuigiri, and a scoop slam on The Big Show, but X-Pac then eliminated Kane with a spinning heel kick. X-Pac hit Big Show with a Bronco buster, but Big Show eliminated him with a gorilla press drop, leaving The Rock and Big Show. The Rock performed a spinebuster and a People's Elbow, but Big Show came back with a chokeslam. Big Show had The Rock on his shoulder, and attempted to throw him over the top rope, but The Rock hung onto the rope, and pulled Big Show over. The Rock won the match.

== Reception ==
In 2011, Jack Bramma of 411Mania gave the event a rating of 8.0 [Very Good], writing, "Easy, easy thumbs up. Triple H-Cactus Jack is a hardcore match with some psychology and tells an awesome story. One of the best brawls you'll ever see. The tables match is a frenzied melee and one of my favorite 10 minute matches ever. Taz's debut and the raucous ovation from the crowd and the rest is good enough to keep up. But please for the love of God, don't watch the Miss Rumble pageant".

== Aftermath ==
Triple H and Cactus Jack's feud continued into No Way Out, the following pay-per-view. On the January 31 episode of Raw is War, Jack fought Triple H in a match where Mick Foley beat Triple H down. The following week, Triple H, in an attempt to end their feud, made a match between the two for the WWF Championship at No Way Out, but Foley would have to retire if he lost. Jack then decided that the match would be a Hell in a Cell match.

Eight days after the Royal Rumble, the "Radicalz" (Chris Benoit, Eddie Guerrero, Perry Saturn, and Dean Malenko) arrived in the WWF from World Championship Wrestling (WCW), supposedly brought in by Cactus Jack, then the following week on Raw Is War, they all turned on Jack when it was revealed that Triple H was the one that signed them to WWF contracts. They would make their PPV debut at No Way Out wrestling as a three-man team (Eddie Guerrero was injured and unable to wrestle).

The feud between Big Show and The Rock, which was in its infancy at the time, kicked into high gear after the finish to the Royal Rumble match. While the television cameras never actually showed this to the viewing audience, the sequence where The Rock used Big Show's momentum to eliminate the big man and pull himself back into the ring ended with The Rock accidentally touching the floor with both feet before Big Show's feet hit. The unintentional botched move was worked into the feud, where Big Show began claiming The Rock had touched first and that he had indisputable video evidence of his victory (which consisted of a shot from a different camera filming the side of the ring where the elimination took place, and which clearly proved Big Show's statement). Once the evidence was shown to Triple H, Big Show received a match with The Rock at No Way Out for the WrestleMania championship shot. Sixteen years later, The Rock made a special return to Raw and ran into the Big Show backstage; after bringing up the 2000 Royal Rumble match, The Rock admitted that Big Show legitimately should have been declared the winner.

The feud between Chris Jericho, Chyna and Hardcore Holly ended when Holly failed to win the WWF Intercontinental Championship from Jericho, and Chyna aligned herself with Jericho, who moved on to feud with Kurt Angle. Angle won the WWF European Championship on the February 10 episode of SmackDown!, and on the February 14 episode of Raw is War, Angle challenged Jericho to a match for the WWF Intercontinental Championship at No Way Out.

The feud between the Hardy Boyz and the Dudley Boyz continued, with Edge and Christian joining the feud. While initially showing respect, the Dudley Boyz attacked the Hardy Boyz during their match on the January 24 episode of Raw is War. On the January 27 episode of SmackDown!, Edge and Christian supported the Hardy Boyz and fought the Dudley Boyz, who put Edge and Christian through a table. On the January 31 episode of Raw is War, the Hardy Boyz put the Dudley Boyz through tables, and, later, the Dudley Boyz put the Hardy Boyz through three stacked tables. On the February 14 episode of Raw is War, D-Von Dudley defeated Edge and Jeff Hardy to earn a shot at the WWF Tag Team Championship at No Way Out, starting their feud with the champions the New Age Outlaws. Also during the match, the Hardy Boyz had a confrontation with Edge and Christian, starting their feud. They would also have a match at No Way Out.

Over 25 years later after this event, in 2025, the Hardy Boyz and the Dudley Boyz, the latter going by the name Team 3D in Total Nonstop Action Wrestling (TNA), would agree to face one another one last time at TNA Bound for Glory in another Tables match, dubbed as "One Final Table", this time for the TNA World Tag Team Championship and the NXT Tag Team Championship, both held by The Hardys. The match would be won by The Hardys and after which, the Dudley Boyz/Team 3D would give their boots to the Hardys, officially retiring from in ring competition.

== Results ==
No.	Results	Stipulations	Times
1	Tazz defeated Kurt Angle by technical submission	Singles match	3:16
2	The Hardy Boyz (Jeff Hardy and Matt Hardy) defeated The Dudley Boyz (Bubba Ray Dudley and D-Von Dudley)	Tag team tables match	10:17
3	Chris Jericho (c) defeated Chyna (c) and Hardcore Holly by pinfall	Triple threat match for the Undisputed WWF Intercontinental Championship	7:30
4	The New Age Outlaws (Billy Gunn and Road Dogg) (c) defeated The Acolytes (Bradshaw and Faarooq) by pinfall	Tag team match for the WWF Tag Team Championship	2:35
5	Triple H (c) defeated Cactus Jack by pinfall	Street Fight for the WWF Championship	26:55
6	The Rock won by last eliminating Big Show	30-man Royal Rumble match for a WWF Championship match at WrestleMania 2000	51:48
(c) / – the champion(s) heading into the match

Jericho and Chyna were co-champions going into the match with Jericho becoming the sole champion as a result of his win.

=== Royal Rumble entrances and eliminations ===
A new entrant came out approximately every 90 seconds.

– Winner

Draw	Entrant	Order eliminated	Eliminated by	Time	Eliminations
1	D'Lo Brown	3	Rikishi	06:08	0
2	Grand Master Sexay	4	Rikishi	07:42	0
3	Mosh	1	Rikishi	03:37	0
4	Christian	2	Rikishi	02:08	0
5	Rikishi	8	Big Boss Man, Bob Backlund, Edge, Gangrel, Test & The British Bulldog	16:23	7
6	Scotty 2 Hotty	5	Rikishi	01:02	0
7	Steve Blackman	6	Rikishi	00:44	0
8	Viscera	7	Rikishi	01:25	0
9	Big Boss Man	15	The Rock	22:47	3
10	Test	17	Big Show	26:17	1
11	The British Bulldog	13	Road Dogg	15:22	1
12	Gangrel	18	Big Show	23:19	1
13	Edge	14	Al Snow & Val Venis	14:48	1
14	Bob Backlund	9	Chris Jericho	02:00	1
15	Chris Jericho	10	Chyna	03:47	1
16	Crash Holly	16	The Rock	14:54	0
17	Chyna	11	Big Boss Man	00:38	1
18	Faarooq	12	Big Boss Man	00:18	0
19	Road Dogg	25	Billy Gunn	19:02	2
20	Al Snow	24	The Rock	17:17	2
21	Val Venis	20	Kane	11:47	1
22	Prince Albert	21	Kane	11:23	0
23	Hardcore Holly	22	Al Snow	11:48	0
24	The Rock	-	Winner	14:47	4
25	Billy Gunn	26	Kane	09:38	2
26	Big Show	29	The Rock	11:12	4
27	Bradshaw	19	Billy Gunn & Road Dogg	00:25	0
28	Kane	27	X-Pac	06:11	3
29	The Godfather	23	Big Show	01:32	0
30	X-Pac	28	Big Show	03:32	1

X-Pac was originally thrown out by The Rock. However, the referees were distracted by the Outlaws beating up Kane, so he got back in the ring. Big Show eliminated X-Pac later.
