= Gapers Block =

Defunct Chicago-centric web publication

- Company type: Privately held company
- Founded: 2003
- Founder: Andrew Huff; Naz Hamid
- Headquarters: Chicago, United States
- Key people: Andrew Huff
- Services: Online magazine
- Website: gapersblock.com

Gapers Block (Gapers Block Media, LLC) was a Chicago-centric web publication focused on covering Chicago culture under the tag line: "Slow down and check out Chicago". The site, gapersblock.com, lists local events, aggregates other Chicago blogs and news of local interest and features many topical blogs: A/C (arts and culture), Drive-Thru (food related), Transmission (local music), Mechanics (state and local politics), Tailgate (sports coverage), and Book Club (book club and literary scene coverage).

== History ==
Conceived in 2003 by Andrew Huff and Naz Hamid, the stuck-in-traffic themed section names, such as Merge (blog, links aggregation), Slowdown (calendar event listings), and Rearview (noteworthy local photos), are inspired by the Chicago-coined term, "gapers' block", a synonym (with "gapers' delay") for rubbernecking. The site was the first city blog in Chicago and one of the earliest examples of the genre; Gothamist and the Metroblogging network were also founded in 2003.

The site was written by volunteers from various backgrounds and professions, with content organized into topical sections, including arts & culture, literature, food, music, politics, and sports.

In 2010, the cookbook The Everything Cast Iron Cookbook was published, based in large part on author Cinnamon Cooper's "One Good Meal" column on Gapers Block.

In December 2015, editor and publisher Andrew Huff announced the site would be going on "indefinite hiatus" on January 1, 2016.

== Accreditations and awards ==
- It was named a "Forbes Favorite" in Forbes.com's Best of the Web directory, in the category "Best City Blogs."
- Web design site Typesites credits Gapers Block’s aesthetics, “well-crafted layout” and noteworthy typography.
- Chicago Community Trust awarded Gapers Block $35,000 in an effort to boost new sources of local news and information and “increase the amount of neighborhood-based, original local coverage ... with priority given to stories about underserved communities and issues that affect them.”
- The Chicago Sun-Times in 2009 named the Gapers Block Book Club the #2 best way to find romance in Chicago.
- Gapers Block Editor and publisher Andrew Huff was listed in Crain’s Chicago Business’s “40 Under 40” in 2009.
- David Schalliol, Brian Ashby, Dave Nagel, Akemi Honga and Natalia Echeverry were the recipients of the Peter Lisagor Award for Best Use of Features Video for "The Area" in 2014. Jason Prechtel was a finalist for the award for Best Individual Blog Post, Independent for “Ventra’s Parent Company: An International History of Fare Card Glitches" the same year.
- The site was named Best Local Blog in the Chicago Reader's "Best of Chicago" poll in 2013, 2014 and 2015

== Notable contributors and alumni ==
- Danny Fenster, journalist
- Anne Elizabeth Moore, freelance journalist, artist, and author
- Nilay Patel, editor-in-chief of The Verge
