= Barbara Bush (disambiguation) =

Barbara Bush (1925–2018) was the wife of George H. W. Bush and the mother of George W. Bush.

Barbara Bush may also refer to:

- Barbara Bush (born 1981), daughter of George W. Bush
- Barbara Bush (diver) (born 1964), Canadian Olympic diver
- Barbara Tyson (born 1964), Canadian actress who has used the name Barbara Bush in her early career
- Cathy Dingman (born 1970), American professional wrestler who used the ring name Barbara Bush

== See also ==
- Barbara Rush (1927–2024), American actress
- Barbara Bush Middle School (Irving, Texas)
