= Crash Holly =

American professional wrestler (1971–2003)

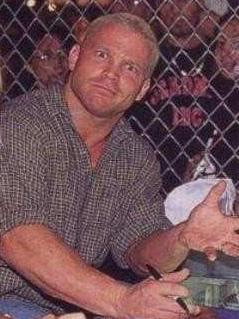
- Lockwood signing autographs

Personal information
- Born: Michael John Lockwood; August 25, 1971 San Francisco, California, U.S.
- Died: November 6, 2003 (aged 32) Navarre, Florida, U.S.
- Cause of death: Suicide
- Spouse: Christeena Wheeler (m. 1999)
- Children: 1

Professional wrestling career
- Ring name(s): Crash; Crash Holly; Erin O'Grady; The Green Ghost; Johnny Pearson; Mad Mikey
- Billed height: 5 ft 10 in (178 cm)
- Billed weight: 198 lb "Allegedly well over 400 lb" (181 kg)
- Billed from: Mobile, Alabama
- Trained by: Jerry Monti; Michael Modest; Ric Thompson
- Debut: 1989

Michael John Lockwood (August 25, 1971 – November 6, 2003) was an American professional wrestler. He was best known for his appearances with the World Wrestling Federation (WWF) / World Wrestling Entertainment (WWE) from 1999 to 2003 under the ring names Crash Holly or simply Crash.

Lockwood debuted in 1989 and spent a decade wrestling on the independent circuit before signing with the World Wrestling Federation in 1998, debuting the following year as Crash Holly. He formed a tag team with his kayfabe cousin Hardcore Holly, with whom he won the WWF World Tag Team Championship. The Holly Cousins was expanded into a stable with the addition of Molly Holly in 2000. During his WWF/WWE career, Holly established himself in the hardcore division by winning the WWF Hardcore Championship on 22 occasions, with many of his reigns coming during a period when the title was defended "24/7". After being released from WWE in June 2003, Holly joined NWA Total Nonstop Action as Mad Mikey, where he remained until his death later that year.

Holly was also a one-time WWF European Champion and a one-time WWF Light Heavyweight Champion. In total, Holly had over 25 championship reigns in the WWF.

== Early life ==
Lockwood was born on August 25, 1971, in San Francisco, California. He was raised in Pacifica, California, where he graduated from Terra Nova High School. He became interested in professional wrestling in the eighth grade, inspired by Brady Boone. While training as a wrestler and working on the independent circuit, he worked a second job at Safeway.

== Professional wrestling career ==
=== Early career (1989–1998) ===
Lockwood debuted in 1989, as "Johnny Pearson" in Bay Area Wrestling for Woody Farmer, where he wrestled until 1994. He dislocated his shoulder about five times and took 18 months off to recover. He then wrestled on the independent circuit as "'Irish' Erin O'Grady". In 1995, he appeared in Mexico with Consejo Mundial de Lucha Libre as "Super Diablo". In 1996, he joined All Pro Wrestling (APW), where he became known as "'The Leprechaun' Erin O'Grady" and had several matches with Vic Grimes.

Lockwood joined the Philadelphia, Pennsylvania-based Extreme Championship Wrestling promotion in November 1997 after ECW wrestler Taz viewed a tape of a match between O'Grady and Michael Modest and referred him to ECW owner Paul Heyman. Erin O'Grady lost four untelevised matches in ECW, including a dark match at November to Remember. Following his stint in ECW, Lockwood returned to APW where he performed until October 1998.

=== World Wrestling Federation / World Wrestling Entertainment (1998–2003) ===
==== Developmental territories (1998–1999) ====
O'Grady wrestled Vic Grimes in a try-out match for the World Wrestling Federation (WWF) on January 20, 1998, and both were signed to contracts. In November 1998, Lockwood was sent to Power Pro Wrestling, the WWF's developmental promotion, to train. Here, he won the Power Pro Wrestling Young Guns Championship and the PPW Tag Team Championship. WWF Talent Coordinator Bruce Prichard sent Lockwood to Mexico, to prepare him for the style of the WWF's lucha libre show, WWF Super Astros. He wrestled in Monterrey for three months, under a mask, as "The Green Ghost" (a play on the word "gringo").

==== Holly Cousins (1999–2000) ====
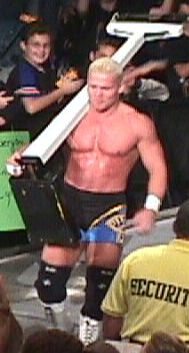
Holly carrying his weighing scale to the ring in 1999.

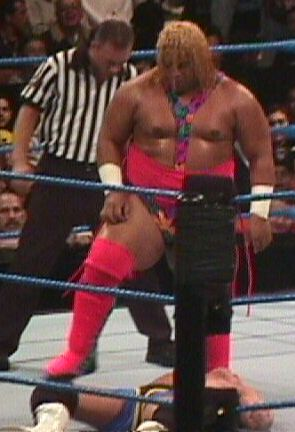
Rikishi and Crash Holly at a Smackdown taping in 1999.

Lockwood debuted on WWF television as "Crash Holly", the storyline cousin of Bob "Hardcore" Holly, on the August 16, 1999, episode of Raw is War They became known as the Holly Cousins. Their relationship was a strained one, and Hardcore frequently threatened Crash. When they took the gimmick of claiming to be "super heavyweights", over 400 lb each, Crash would carry a scale to ringside to "weigh in" before matches.

Crash made his pay-per-view debut at SummerSlam in August, where the Holly Cousins wrestled in a Tag Team Turmoil match, won by the Acolytes Protection Agency. At Rebellion, the Holly Cousins competed against APA and Edge and Christian in a triangle match, which Edge and Christian won. On October 17, at No Mercy, the Holly Cousins defeated The New Age Outlaws by disqualification. The next night on Raw is War, they defeated the Rock 'n' Sock Connection for the WWF Tag Team Championship. They held the title until the November 4 SmackDown!, when they lost it to Mankind and his new partner, Al Snow.

At Survivor Series on November 14, the Holly Cousins teamed with Too Cool to defeat Edge & Christian and the Hardy Boyz in a survivor series match. Later that month, the Holly Cousins began a short feud with Too Cool and Rikishi Phatu. At Armageddon on December 12, 1999, they defeated Phatu and Viscera. The feud continued into February 2000. At the Royal Rumble on January 23, 2000, both Hollys took part in the titular Royal Rumble match, with Crash Holly being eliminated by The Rock.

==== Championship reigns (2000–2001) ====
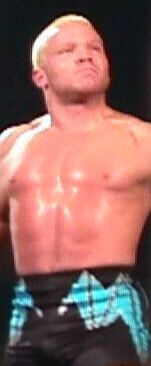
Holly making his entrance at King of the Ring in June 2000.

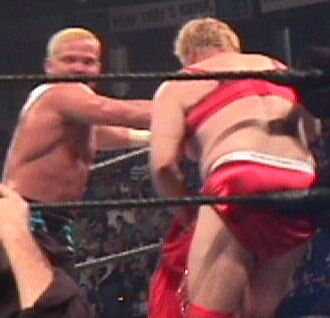
Holly and Pat Patterson in the ring at King of the Ring in June 2000.

In February 2000, Crash Holly joined the hardcore division. On the February 24 episode of SmackDown!, he defeated Test to begin his first of 22 Hardcore Championship reigns. He decreed that he must defend the championship twenty four hours a day, seven days a week, which later became known as the "24/7 Rule". This meant that the title was permanently contested, not just in sanctioned matches, and could change hands anywhere, anytime anyone pinned the champion, so long as a WWF referee counted the fall. Holly was frequently attacked by other wrestlers in unlikely locations, including an airport, a funhouse, a circus, and his hotel room. Although he was often pinned, he usually immediately regained the title. His most common tactic was to sneak a pin, often after the champion had been beaten down by someone else, and quickly run backstage, away from possible challengers. This turned him into a crowd favorite and earned him the nickname "The Houdini of Hardcore". He frequently defended the championship against non-wrestlers, including referees and road agents, like Gerald Brisco and Pat Patterson. He had a long feud with The Mean Street Posse (Pete Gas, Rodney and Joey Abs) over the title. He even lost, and quickly regained, the title against one of the Godfather's hos.

At Rebellion, Crash defeated William Regal to win the European Championship. He lost the title to Regal two days later. In late 2000, another of Crash's storyline cousins, Molly Holly, was introduced. In 2001, The Holly Cousins feuded with The Dudley Boyz. In the course of this feud, Molly began a romantic relationship with Spike Dudley, leading to internal disputes within each family, as well as a Romeo and Juliet-style angle between the six of them. On the March 18, 2001, episode of Heat, Crash defeated Dean Malenko to win the Light Heavyweight Championship. He defended it on two episodes of Heat, against Funaki and Grandmaster Sexay, before dropping it to the debuting Jerry Lynn on the April 29 episode. In April 2001, Holly and Hardcore briefly reunited as a lower card team until December of that year.

In July 2001, Holly appeared with the International Wrestling Association in Puerto Rico, briefly holding the IWA Hardcore Championship and IWA World Junior Heavyweight Championship. Throughout late 2001, he wrestled primarily on house shows and on Jakked and Sunday Night Heat. At Survivor Series on November 18, 2001, Holly took part in a battle royal that would guarantee the winner immunity from being fired that was won by Test. Throughout the remainder of 2001 and early 2002, Holly continued to wrestle primarily on house shows and the WWF's secondary television shows.

==== Mattitude Follower (2002–2003) ====
When the WWF was renamed World Wrestling Entertainment and divided into two Raw and SmackDown! brands, Holly was assigned to the Raw roster, where he had little success. Holly jumped ship to SmackDown! on the September 2, 2002, episode of Raw during a match with Jeff Hardy. Earlier, Raw General Manager Eric Bischoff was informed that a Raw wrestler would leave to reunite with a relative on SmackDown!, and ordered a beatdown by 3-Minute Warning on Hardy, who he wrongly suspected of planning to join his brother, Matt Hardy, until Crash revealed that he was the one who was leaving, planning to join his cousin Hardcore Holly on SmackDown!. In Holly's first SmackDown! match, on September 5, he defeated The Hurricane. Holly then feuded with Cruiserweight Champion Jamie Noble. On the October 3 SmackDown!, Noble defeated Holly to retain the title.

On the December 19 SmackDown!, Holly teamed with Bill DeMott to defeat Noble and Nunzio. After the match, DeMott turned on Holly and attacked him. This led to a match on the next SmackDown!, which DeMott won. After being sidelined for three months, Holly returned on the April 24, 2003, episode of SmackDown!. He soon joined Matt Hardy and Shannon Moore in the Mattitude Followers (abbreviated "MF'er") stable. As Crash was Moore's alleged apprentice, Hardy also referred to him as a "Moore-on". Holly's last several matches with the company were tag matches with Moore, as well as house show matches against newcomer Orlando Jordan. On June 30, 2003, Lockwood was released from WWE.

=== Total Nonstop Action Wrestling (2003) ===
Lockwood signed a contract with NWA Total Nonstop Action in July 2003 and debuted as "Mad Mikey" on July 23, accepting an open challenge from Elix Skipper and losing the match.

== Personal life ==
Lockwood met his wife, Christeena Wheeler, when she escorted Mark Henry to the ring at Unforgiven 1999, in Charlotte, North Carolina. They married on New Year's Eve, 1999. Lockwood had one daughter, prior to his marriage, who was 7 years old at the time of his death. In 2002, he opened "Crash Holly's School of Professional Wrestling" in Salisbury, North Carolina, where Wheeler grew up.

== Death ==
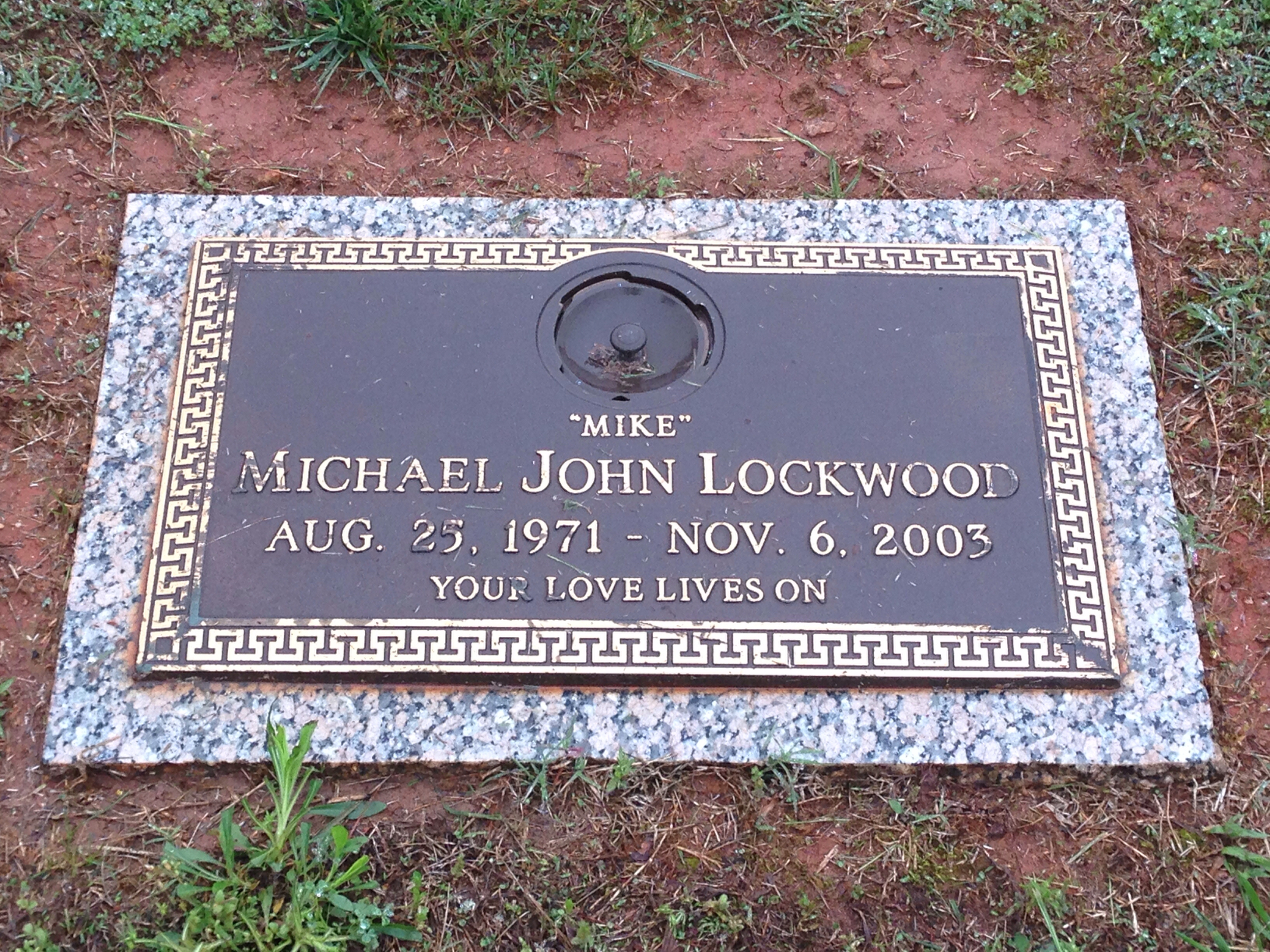
Lockwood's grave

Lockwood died on November 6, 2003, at his friend and fellow wrestler Stevie Richards' house in Florida. He was 32 years old. He was found partially clothed with a pool of vomit around his face. Empty bottles of the prescription drug carisoprodol and a partially consumed bottle of alcohol were found nearby. He had recently received divorce papers from his wife. His death, caused by choking on his own vomit, was officially ruled a suicide. He was buried in China Grove in Rowan County, North Carolina.

In August 2005, Nora Greenwald, who performed alongside Lockwood as Molly Holly, released an autobiographical DVD titled "Nora Greenwald: Shootin' the ~~Shi~~ Crap", and a portion of the profits from the sale of the DVD went to Lockwood's daughter's education fund. In March 2005, the New Breed Wrestling Association held the "Mike Lockwood Memorial Tournament", which was won by Michael Modest. At ECW One Night Stand in 2005, Lockwood was one of the deceased former ECW wrestlers honored in a video package.

== Championships and accomplishments ==
- All Pro Wrestling
  - APW Junior Heavyweight Championship (1 time)
- International Wrestling Association
  - IWA Hardcore Championship (1 time)
  - IWA World Junior Heavyweight Championship (1 time)
  - UWA World Junior Heavyweight Championship (1 time)
- Mid-Eastern Wrestling Federation
  - MEWF Cruiserweight Championship (1 time)
- Power Pro Wrestling
  - PPW Tag Team Championship (1 time) – with Vic Grimes
  - PPW Young Guns Championship (1 time)
- Pro Wrestling Illustrated
  - Ranked No. 36 of the top 500 singles wrestlers in the PWI 500 in 2000
- Supreme Pro Wrestling
  - SPW Tag Team Championship (1 time) – with Hook Bomberry
- World Wrestling Federation / World Wrestling Entertainment
  - WWF European Championship (1 time)
  - WWF/E Hardcore Championship (22 times)
  - WWF Light Heavyweight Championship (1 time)
  - WWF Tag Team Championship (1 time) – with Hardcore Holly

== See also ==
- List of premature professional wrestling deaths
