= WBYO =

Christian radio station in Sellersville, Pennsylvania

Word FM Flagship station
- Sellersville, Pennsylvania; United States
- Broadcast area: Delaware, Lehigh, and Cumberland valleys
- Frequency: 88.9 MHz
- Branding: Positive & Uplifting Word FM

Programming
- Language: English
- Format: Christian adult contemporary
- Network: Word FM

Ownership
- Owner: Four Rivers Community Broadcasting Corporation
- Sister stations: WPAZ

History
- First air date: 1993

Technical information
- Licensing authority: FCC
- Facility ID: 7922
- Class: A
- ERP: 900 watts
- HAAT: 133 meters (436 ft)
- Transmitter coordinates: 40°23′2.3″N 75°21′0.6″W
- Translator: See § Translators
- Repeater: See § Stations

Links
- Public license information: Public file; LMS
- Webcast: Listen live
- Website: wordfm.org

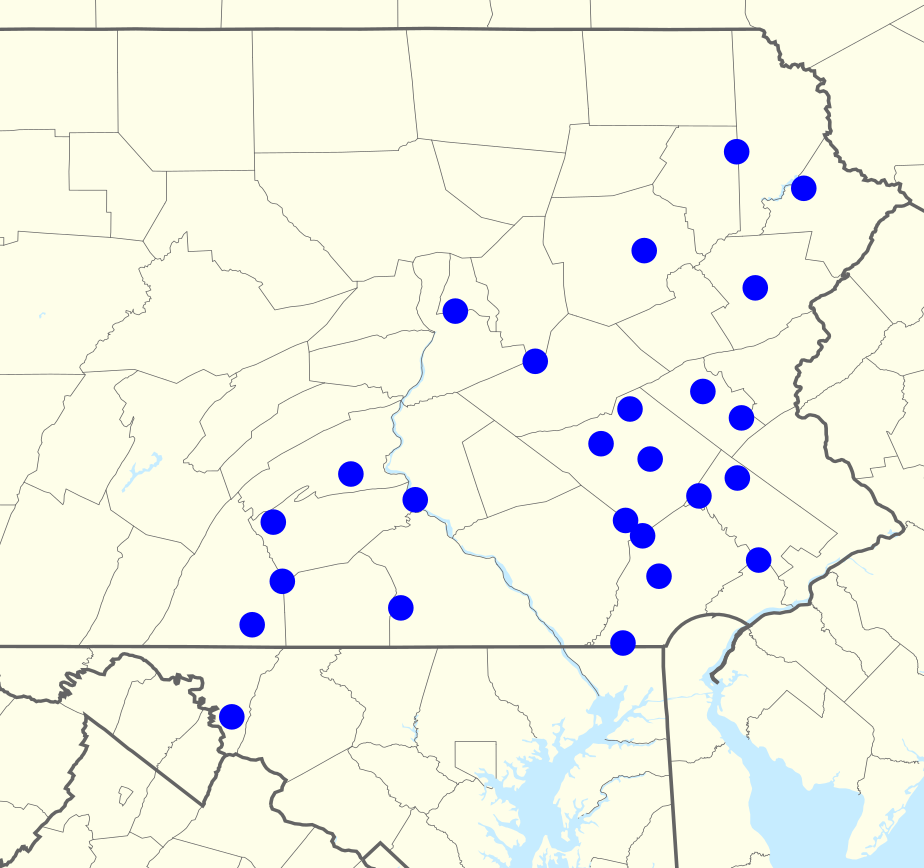
Map of simulcasts and transmitters

WBYO (88.9 FM) is a radio station licensed to Sellersville, Pennsylvania, United States, and serves the Philadelphia area. The station serves as the flagship station for "Word FM", a network of contemporary Christian radio stations in eastern and South Central Pennsylvania. WBYO is owned by Four Rivers Community Broadcasting Corporation. In 2009, Word FM switched from contemporary Christian hit radio to Christian adult contemporary.

== Stations ==
| Call sign | Frequency | City of license | Facility ID | Also serves | Class | Power (W) | ERP (W) | Height (m (ft)) | Transmitter coordinates |
|---|---|---|---|---|---|---|---|---|---|
| WZXH | 91.7 FM | Hagerstown, Maryland | 122334 | Martinsburg, West Virginia | A | — | 900 | 129 meters (423 ft) | 39°27′39.3″N 77°41′56.9″W |
| WBZC | 88.9 FM | Pemberton, New Jersey | 7844 | Philadelphia and South Jersey | B1 | — | 10,000 | 67 meters (220 ft) | 39°50′34.4″N 74°32′38.6″W |
| WZXB | 90.5 FM | Bechtelsville, Pennsylvania | 174572 | Berks County, Pennsylvania; Upper Montgomery County, Pennsylvania | A | — | 1,100 | 172 meters (564 ft) | 40°24′45.3″N 75°50′40.7″W |
| WZXQ | 88.3 FM | Chambersburg, Pennsylvania | 93044 | — | A | — | 110 | 352 meters (1,155 ft) | 39°57′40.3″N 77°28′31″W |
| WZXE | 88.3 FM | East Nottingham, Pennsylvania | 174592 | Rising Sun, Maryland | A | — | 480 | 145 meters (476 ft) | 39°44′0.4″N 75°57′54.8″W |
| WEVW | 90.9 FM | Elysburg, Pennsylvania | 174767 | Sunbury–Lewisburg, Pennsylvania | A | — | 230 | 283 meters (928 ft) | 40°57′31.3″N 76°42′29.9″W |
| WZXM | 88.1 FM | Harrisburg, Pennsylvania | 66520 | — | A | — | 540 | 32 meters (105 ft) | 40°15′44.3″N 76°53′9.9″W |
| WBYH | 89.1 FM | Hawley, Pennsylvania | 78759 | Lake Wallenpaupack | A | — | 700 | 165 meters (541 ft) | 41°24′43.3″N 75°9′49.6″W |
| WZZH | 90.9 FM | Honesdale, Pennsylvania | 91954 | — | A | — | 700 | 165 meters (541 ft) | 41°32′49.3″N 75°27′40.6″W |
| WZMV | 89.1 FM | Mohrsville, Pennsylvania | 173919 | Berks County, Pennsylvania | B1 | — | 7,500 | 70 meters (230 ft) | 40°28′9.3″N 76°3′44.8″W |
| WZXN | 90.1 FM | Newburg, Pennsylvania | 173888 | Carlisle, Pennsylvania | B1 | — | 6,300 | −14 meters (−46 ft) | 40°10′47.3″N 77°30′55″W |
| WPAZ | 1370 AM | Pottstown, Pennsylvania | 25002 | — | D | 1,000 day; 52 night | — | — | 40°16′35.35″N 75°37′42.67″W |
| WLHI | 90.3 FM | Schnecksville, Pennsylvania | 36983 | Allentown, Pennsylvania | A | — | 420 | 70 meters (230 ft) | 40°39′43.3″N 75°36′39.6″W |
| WBYO (Note: Flagship station) | 88.9 FM | Sellersville, Pennsylvania | 7922 | Philadelphia | A | — | 900 | 133 meters (436 ft) | 40°23′2.3″N 75°21′0.6″W |
| WZXY | 90.7 FM | Spring Grove, Pennsylvania | 173893 | York–Hanover–Gettysburg, Pennsylvania | A | — | 160 | 225 meters (738 ft) | 39°51′47.3″N 76°56′59.9″W |
| WBYX | 88.7 FM | Stroudsburg, Pennsylvania | 22181 | — | B1 | — | 4,000 | 242 meters (794 ft) | 41°2′40.3″N 75°22′43.6″W |
| WZZD | 88.1 FM | Warwick, Pennsylvania | 91617 | Chester County, Pennsylvania | A | — | 430 | 185 meters (607 ft) | 40°7′45.4″N 75°52′41.8″W |
| WYTL | 91.9 FM | Wyomissing, Pennsylvania | 91726 | Reading, Pennsylvania; Lancaster County, Pennsylvania | A | — | 450 | 166 meters (545 ft) | 40°11′9.3″N 75°57′13.7″W |

=== Translators ===
In addition to the main station, WBYO and its simulcast stations are relayed by additional translators to widen its broadcast area.

Broadcast translators for WBYO
| Call sign | Frequency | City of license | FID | ERP (W) | HAAT | Class | Transmitter coordinates | FCC info |
|---|---|---|---|---|---|---|---|---|
| W278AI | 103.5 FM | Center Valley, Pennsylvania | 7930 | 10 | 299.8 m (984 ft) | D | 40°33′52.4″N 75°26′23.7″W | LMS |
| W245AG | 96.9 FM | Glenside, Pennsylvania | 86419 | 26 | 111.7 m (366 ft) | D | 40°5′0.3″N 75°10′53.6″W | LMS |
| W279BS | 103.7 FM | Hamburg, Pennsylvania | 141463 | 200 | 298.6 m (980 ft) | D | 40°35′50.3″N 75°56′2.7″W | LMS |
| W289CZ | 105.7 FM | Lansdale, Pennsylvania | 153106 | 720 | 0 m (0 ft) | D | 40°14′18.3″N 75°18′58.6″W | LMS |

Broadcast translators for WBYH
| Call sign | Frequency | City of license | FID | ERP (W) | HAAT | Class | Transmitter coordinates | FCC info |
|---|---|---|---|---|---|---|---|---|
| W227BA | 93.3 FM | Bear Creek, Pennsylvania | 157103 | 10 | 475.3 m (1,559 ft) | D | 41°10′55.3″N 75°52′15.7″W | LMS |
| W265CU | 100.9 FM | Scranton, Pennsylvania | 141467 | 25 | −88.4 m (−290 ft) | D | 41°24′34.3″N 75°39′59.7″W | LMS |

Broadcast translator for WZXQ
| Call sign | Frequency | City of license | FID | ERP (W) | Class | Transmitter coordinates | FCC info |
|---|---|---|---|---|---|---|---|
| W258DA | 99.5 FM | Hagerstown, Maryland | 141670 | 50 | D | 39°37′36.4″N 77°42′38″W | LMS |

Broadcast translator for WZZD
| Call sign | Frequency | City of license | FID | ERP (W) | HAAT | Class | Transmitter coordinates | FCC info |
|---|---|---|---|---|---|---|---|---|
| W269BL | 101.7 FM | Coatesville, Pennsylvania | 153313 | 3 | 26.3 m (86 ft) | D | 39°58′48.3″N 75°48′19.8″W | LMS |

For the WLHI translators, see WLHI § Translators
For the WPAZ translators, see WPAZ § Translators
