= The Kat =

American professional wrestler (born 1970)

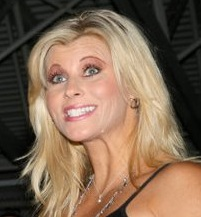
- Carter in 2010

Personal information
- Born: Stacy Lee Carter; September 29, 1970 (age 55) West Memphis, Arkansas, U.S.
- Spouses: Jerry Lawler (m. 2000; div. 2003) Sinn Bodhi (m. 2010; div. 2013)
- Family: Brian Lawler (ex-stepson)

Professional wrestling career
- Ring name(s): The Kat; Lovely Stacy; Miss Kitty; Stacy; Stacy Carter
- Billed height: 5 ft 3 in (160 cm)
- Billed weight: 106 lb (48 kg)
- Trained by: Al Snow; Ivory; Triple H Terry Golden
- Debut: 1998
- Retired: 2011

Stacy Lee Carter (born September 29, 1970) is an American retired professional wrestling valet and professional wrestler. She is best known for her tenure in the World Wrestling Federation from August 1999 to February 2001 under the ring names Miss Kitty and The Kat, where she held the WWF Women's Championship once.

== Professional wrestling career ==
=== Early career (1998–1999) ===
Carter was introduced to professional wrestling by her then-partner, Jerry Lawler. She made her wrestling debut on April 18, 1998 in Jonesboro, Arkansas for Power Pro Wrestling.

=== World Wrestling Federation (1999–2001) ===
==== Alliance with Chyna; Women's Champion (1999–2000) ====
Carter first appeared on World Wrestling Federation (WWF)'s flagship program, Raw is War, on August 23, 1999. She debuted as Miss Kitty, an assistant to Debra, appointed to her by Jeff Jarrett, whom Debra managed. The partnership ended when Jarrett left the company after losing the Intercontinental Championship to Chyna at No Mercy. Because Jarrett was departing the company after the match, Miss Kitty began managing Chyna, and then started dressing in 'Chyna-like' clothing and wearing a black wig.

At Armageddon in December 1999, Miss Kitty won her only WWF Women's Championship in a Four Corners Evening Gown Pool match by defeating then-champion Ivory, Jacqueline, and Barbara "BB" Bush by stripping them of their gowns. The special guest referees were The Fabulous Moolah and Mae Young. After the match, Miss Kitty stripped out of her dress in celebration and quickly flashed the crowd her breasts. The following evening, she announced before successfully defending her title in a thong in a Chocolate Pudding Match against Tori that she was changing her name to The Kat. The Kat then appeared at the Royal Rumble in the 'Miss Royal Rumble Swimsuit Contest', where she appeared in a bikini made out of bubble wrap. The contest, however, was won by Mae Young. She lost the Championship on the January 31 edition of Raw to Hervina in a Lumberjill Snowbunny match, a match that took place in a snow filled pool surrounded by female wrestlers whose purpose was to keep The Kat and Hervina from leaving the pool.

==== Rivalry with Terri Runnels (2000) ====
The Kat then began an on-screen rivalry with Terri Runnels, although neither were fully trained wrestlers. At WrestleMania 2000, Runnels (accompanied by The Fabulous Moolah) defeated The Kat (with Mae Young) in a catfight. Val Venis was the special guest referee, but he was distracted during the match when Young kissed him, which allowed Moolah to pull The Kat out of the ring. When Venis saw her out of the ring, he declared Runnels the winner. Post-match, The Kat attacked Runnels by stripping off her pants to expose her thong. The feud continued, and the duo had an arm wrestling match at Insurrextion. The Kat was victorious, but after the match, Runnels pulled The Kat's top off, exposing her breasts, which The Kat allowed. The two women continued to feud throughout the summer, often in mixed tag matches. In June 2000, The Kat attempted to regain the Women's Championship by entering in the first-ever women's battle royal to become the #1 contender, which also featured the likes of Lita, Jacqueline and Ivory, but was eliminated by her rival Terri. The feud resurfaced in a 'Thong Stink Face' match at SummerSlam, which The Kat won by performing a stinkface on Runnels. She would at times team up with Jerry Lawler, Rikishi and Al Snow in mix tag matches against Terri with Dean Malenko and Perry Saturn.

==== Rivalry with Right to Censor (2001) ====
In early 2001, The Kat began a new storyline with a stable called "Right to Censor", a group of wrestlers purportedly wanting to rein in the vulgarity of the "Attitude Era," during which she demanded equal time for the "right for nudity". During this time, The Kat also began competing in WWF's various developmental territories against the likes of Victoria, Molly Holly, Jasmine St. Claire and Cynthia Lynch. At No Way Out, Jerry Lawler, who was representing The Kat, lost a match to Steven Richards, the head of the stable, after The Kat mistakenly hit Lawler with the Women's Championship belt. As a result of Lawler losing the match, she was forced to join the stable.

On February 27, 2001, The Kat was abruptly released from the WWF in the middle of the Right to Censor storyline. As a result, her husband Jerry Lawler also quit the company. According to Lawler, The Kat was released from the WWF because Vince McMahon decided to end the angle with the Right to Censor. Other insiders cite The Kat's negative backstage attitude as the reason for her dismissal. In 2021, Former head of WWF talent relations, commentator, and WWE Hall of Famer Jim Ross stated that the reason for The Kat's departure from the WWF was "based on what the writers said, she was too hard to work with. So, they caught Vince on a day when he was not in a really great mood, apparently. I got called in Vince's office, 'I want her gone.' 'What?' 'I want her gone today.' So, you know, that's where your job becomes very challenging and Vince McMahon's word was final".

=== Late career (2001, 2010–2011, 2015) ===
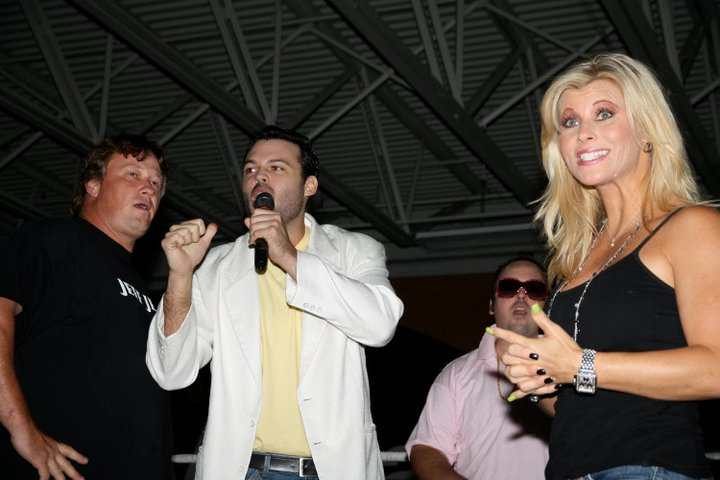
Carter at an independent event in 2010.

After Carter and Lawler left the World Wrestling Federation, they worked various independent wrestling events. She retired from wrestling in 2001. They also signed with Tri-Star Productions and worked at Memphis Championship Wrestling.

Carter made her debut for Tri-State Wrestling Alliance (TWA) on June 5, 2010 at the TWA Homecoming event in Plymouth Meeting, Pennsylvania, where she teamed up with Demolition (Ax and Smash) in a winning effort defeating Sheeta and The Nigerian Nightmares (Maifu and Saifu) in a 6-person mixed-tag team match. Carter made her debut for Stranglehold Wrestling (SHW) on August 26, 2010 at the Stranglehold Devils Playground Tour in Oshawa, Ontario, Canada, where she competed in an Arm-Wrestling match against Pissed Off Pete in a no-contest. Later that event, Carter accompanied Sinn Bohdi to the ring where he competed against George Terzis. Her last match was teaming with Sinn Bodhi defeating Massive Damage and Sexy Samantha at Future Stars of Wrestling (FSW) in Las Vegas on April 18, 2011.

In 2015, Carter was featured as a guest in WWE's documentary titled Good to Be the King: The Jerry Lawler Story, which featured her ex-husband Jerry Lawler. In the same year, she also appeared in an episode of The WWE List, a digital series that aired on WWE.com.

== Personal life ==
Carter's family was originally from West Memphis, Arkansas. After her parents divorced, Carter's mother moved to Memphis, Tennessee. Stacy Carter, however, as well as her younger brother and sister, continued to live with their father, who worked as a policeman, in Arkansas. Carter moved to Memphis to live with her mother, Cathy, after graduating from high school.

Carter met Jerry Lawler, her future husband, at a charity softball game at Treadwell High School in Memphis on July 23, 1989, two months before her nineteenth birthday. She was attending the game with her mother, who was dating one of the players on the team for which Lawler also played. Lawler, however, was married at the time, and he claims that when he initially met Carter, he considered an affair. After Lawler separated from his wife, Carter moved in with him. When Carter first met Lawler, she was working as a bank teller. Lawler later helped her get a job at a photography studio, and she also opened and ran her own hair salon. Carter was less than sixteen months older than Lawler's son Brian.

Lawler and Carter married in September 2000. While they were together, former professional wrestler Missy Hyatt offered Carter $10,000 to pose nude on her website, but Carter refused the offer. Carter decided to leave Lawler in July 2001, and they separated not long after. She left professional wrestling upon separating from Jerry Lawler. She worked in the field of real estate in Lee County, Florida for Century 21 Real Estate for some time after the divorce.

Carter and professional wrestler Nick Cvjetkovich announced their engagement on June 12, 2010. Cvjetkovich and Carter were married in St. Petersburg Florida July 29, 2010 on the beach in front of many family and friends. Stevan Cvjetkovich (Nicholas' younger brother) and Edge both stood as best men. Jimmy Hart gave Carter away in the ceremony. They divorced in 2013.

== Filmography ==
=== Film ===
Year	Title	Role	Notes
1999	Man on the Moon	Lawler's Girlfriend	Uncredited

=== Video games ===
Year	Title	Notes	Ref.
2000	WWF No Mercy	Video game debut	
2000	WWF SmackDown! 2: Know Your Role	—N/a	

== Championships and accomplishments ==
- World Wrestling Federation
  - WWF Women's Championship (1 time)
