= List of WWF Light Heavyweight Champions =

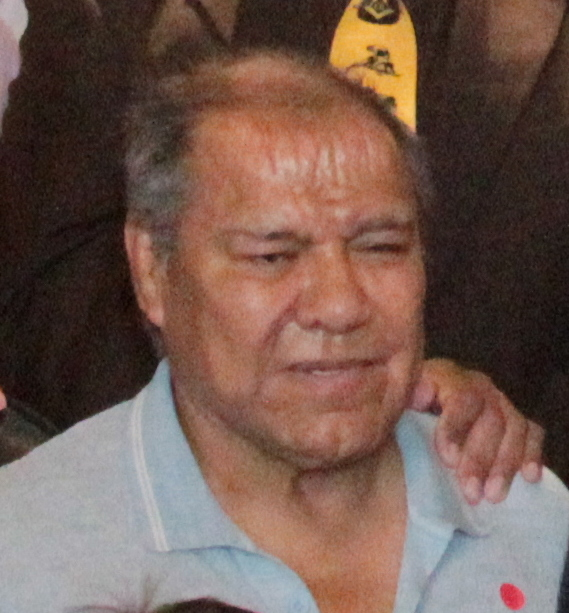
Villano III (pictured 2018) holds the record for longest combined WWF Light Heavyweight title reign.

The WWF Light Heavyweight Championship was a professional wrestling cruiserweight championship owned and promoted by the World Wrestling Federation (WWF). Only cruiserweight wrestlers that weighed less than 220 pounds (100 kg), called "light heavyweights" by the WWF, were allowed to challenge for the title. From 1981 through the 1990s, the WWF had a business partnership with the Universal Wrestling Association (UWA), a Mexican-based lucha libre promotion, which resulted in the creation of the WWF Light Heavyweight Championship for the UWA. When the UWA ceased operations in 1995, the title traveled to the Japanese promotions Michinoku Pro Wrestling (MPW) and New Japan Pro-Wrestling (NJPW). In 1997, as a result of the WWF owning the trademarks to the championship, NJPW was forced to return the title to the WWF. One month later, the WWF began utilizing the title in the United States. After World Championship Wrestling (WCW) and its assets were acquired by the WWF in March 2001, the conceptually similar WCW Cruiserweight Championship was also used by the promotion, before completely replacing the Light Heavyweight Championship in 2002.

Title reigns were determined by professional wrestling matches that involved wrestlers in pre-existing scripted feuds, plots, and storylines or were awarded the title due to scripted circumstances. Wrestlers were portrayed as either villains or heroes as they followed a series of tension-building events, which culminated in a match or series of matches for the championship. The title was won in Japan, Mexico, and 11 American states. The first champion to be recognized by the UWA and NJPW was Perro Aguayo, who won the title in a tournament final in March 1981. Shinjiro Otani was the final champion recognized by the NJPW before the title was returned to the WWF; he had won the title in August 1997. Although his reign is unrecognized by the WWF, Último Dragón is the only wrestler to hold a WWF championship and a WCW championship at the same time before WWF's purchase of WCW, having held the WWF Light Heavyweight and WCW Cruiserweight championships simultaneously in 1996. The first champion recognized by the WWF was Taka Michinoku, who won the title in a tournament final on December 7, 1997. After winning the championship in August 2001, X-Pac was the final wrestler to have held the title before it was replaced by the WCW Cruiserweight Championship. Aguayo and Villano III held the title the most times, with eight reigns each. At 826 days, Villano III's reign from 1984 to 1986 was the longest in the title's history. Perro Aguayo and Scotty 2 Hotty had the shortest reigns, each having reigns lasting eight days. Overall, there were 45 title reigns in the championship's history.

== Reigns ==
=== Recognition by the UWA/MPW/NJPW ===
Key
No.	Overall reign number
Reign	Reign number for the specific champion
Days	Number of days held

No.	Champion	Championship change			Reign statistics		Notes	Ref.
No.	Champion	Date	Event	Location	Reign	Days	Notes	Ref.
Universal Wrestling Association (UWA)
1	Perro Aguayo	March 26, 1981	NJPW Big Fight Series	Shimizu, Japan	1	183	Aguayo defeated Gran Hamada in a tournament final to become the inaugural champion.	
2	Fishman	September 25, 1981	Hollywood Wrestling house show	Los Angeles, CA	1	15		
3	Perro Aguayo	October 10, 1981	Hollywood Wrestling house show	Los Angeles, CA	2	8		
4	Chris Adams	October 18, 1981	UWA house show	Mexico City, Mexico	1	56		
5	Perro Aguayo	December 13, 1981	UWA house show	Mexico City, Mexico	3	129		
6	Gran Hamada	April 21, 1982	NJPW house show	Tokyo, Japan	1	130		
7	Perro Aguayo	August 29, 1982	UWA house show	Mexico City, Mexico	4	203		
8	Villano III	March 20, 1983	UWA house show	Mexico City, Mexico	1	140		
9	Perro Aguayo	August 7, 1983	UWA house show	Mexico City, Mexico	5	254		
10	Gran Hamada	April 17, 1984	UWF Opening Series	Tokyo, Japan	2	33		
11	Villano III	May 20, 1984	UWA house show	Mexico City, Mexico	2	826		
12	Fishman	August 24, 1986	UWA house show	Mexico City, Mexico	2	122		
13	Perro Aguayo	December 24, 1986	UWA house show	Mexico City, Mexico	6	130		
—	Vacated	May 3, 1987	—	—	—	—	The UWA forced Perro Aguayo to relinquish the championship after a title defense against Villano III ended in controversy.	
14	Villano III	June 17, 1987	UWA house show	Mexico City, Mexico	3	109	Villano III defeated Perro Aguayo in a rematch for the championship.	
15	Rambo	October 4, 1987	UWA house show	Mexico City, Mexico	1	281		
16	Villano III	July 11, 1988	UWA house show	Mexico City, Mexico	4	399		
17	Sangre Chicana	August 14, 1989	UWA house show	Mexico City, Mexico	1	62		
18	Perro Aguayo	October 15, 1989	UWA house show	Mexico City, Mexico	7	49		
19	Sangre Chicana	December 3, 1989	UWA house show	Mexico City, Mexico	2	175		
20	Villano III	May 27, 1990	UWA house show	Naucalpan, Mexico	5	280		
21	Pegasus Kid	March 3, 1991	UWA house show	Naucalpan, Mexico	1	560		
22	Villano III	September 13, 1992	UWA house show	Naucalpan, Mexico	6	110		
23	El Signo	January 1, 1993	UWA house show	Nezahualcóyotl, Mexico	1	563		
24	Villano III	July 18, 1994	UWA house show	Puebla, Mexico	7	176		
—	Vacated	January 10, 1995	—	—	—	—	Villano III was forced to vacate the championship by the UWA after he signed a contract with the PROMELL promotion.	
Michinoku Pro Wrestling (MPW)
25	Aero Flash	June 16, 1995	UWA house show	Nezahualcóyotl, Mexico	1	282	Flash won the vacant championship by defeating The King in a tournament final. During this win the title was recognized by Michinoku Pro Wrestling.	
26	The Great Sasuke	March 24, 1996	MPW house show	Shirakawa, Japan	1	90		
27	El Samurai	June 22, 1996	MPW house show	Naruko, Japan	1	43		
28	The Great Sasuke	August 4, 1996	NJPW G1 Climax 1996	Tokyo, Japan	2	68	During this reign, the championship becomes part of the NJPW's J-Crown.	
29	Último Dragón	October 11, 1996	WAR Osaka Crush Night!	Osaka, Japan	1	85		
30	Jushin Thunder Liger	January 4, 1997	NJPW Wrestling World 1997	Tokyo, Japan	1	183		
31	El Samurai	July 6, 1997	NJPW Summer Struggle 1997	Sapporo, Japan	2	35		
32	Shinjiro Otani	August 10, 1997	NJPW The Four Heaven in Nagoya	Nagoya, Japan	1	87		
—	Vacated	November 5, 1997	—	—	—	—	On November 5, 1997, the J-Crown championships (with the exception of the IWGP Junior Heavyweight Championship) were vacated. Shinjiro Otani returned its component belts to their home promotions, including the WWF Light Heavyweight Championship.	

=== Recognition by the WWF ===
Key
No.	Overall reign number
Reign	Reign number for the specific champion
Days	Number of days held
Days recog.	Number of days held recognized by the promotion
†	Championship change is unrecognized by the promotion
<1	Reign lasted less than a day

No.	Champion	Championship change			Reign statistics			Notes	Ref.
No.	Champion	Date	Event	Location	Reign	Days	Days recog.	Notes	Ref.
World Wrestling Federation (WWF)
33	Taka Michinoku	December 7, 1997	D-Generation X: In Your House.	Springfield, MA	1	315	314	Michinoku defeated Brian Christopher in a tournament final to win the championship. After this win WWF recognized Taka Michinoku as the inaugural champion.	
34	Christian	October 18, 1998	Judgment Day: In Your House	Chicago, IL	1	30	29		
35	Gillberg	November 17, 1998	Raw is War	Columbus, OH	1	448	445	This match aired on November 23, 1998 via tape delay. Gillberg won the title under the ring name "Duane Gill" but defended it under the name Gillberg.	
36	Essa Rios	February 8, 2000	Heat	Austin, TX	1	34	31	This match aired on February 13, 2000 via tape delay.	
37	Dean Malenko	March 13, 2000	Raw	East Rutherford, NJ	1	35	34		
38	Scotty 2 Hotty	April 17, 2000	Raw	State College, PA	1	8	9		
39	Dean Malenko	April 25, 2000	SmackDown!	Charlotte, NC	2	322	321	This match aired on April 27, 2000 via tape delay.	
40	Crash Holly	March 13, 2001	Heat	Anaheim, CA	1	47	44	This match aired on March 18, 2001 via tape delay.	
41	Jerry Lynn	April 29, 2001	Heat	Chicago, IL	1	37	38		
42	Jeff Hardy	June 5, 2001	SmackDown!	Grand Forks, ND	1	20	17	This match aired on June 7, 2001 via tape delay.	
43	X-Pac	June 25, 2001	Raw	New York City, NY	1	42	41	X-Pac later defeated Billy Kidman on July 30, 2001 to win the WCW Cruiserweight Championship.	
44	Tajiri	August 6, 2001	Raw	Anaheim, CA	1	13	12	X-Pac's WCW Cruiserweight Championship was not on the line.	
45	X-Pac	August 19, 2001	SummerSlam	San Jose, CA	2	201	201	X-Pac was the reigning WCW Cruiserweight Champion until losing the Cruiserweight title to Billy Kidman on October 9, 2001. X-Pac was the final wrestler to hold the title, a title unification match at Survivor Series against WCW Cruiserweight Champion Tajiri was canceled because X-Pac was injured.	
—	Deactivated	March 8, 2002	—	—	—	—	—	The championship was removed from television after X-Pac's injury, but he would continue to defend the title on house shows until it was officially retired on March 8, 2002.	

== Combined reigns recognized by the UWA/MPW/NJPW ==
Rank	Wrestler	No. of reigns	Combined days
1	Villano III	7	2,040
2	Perro Aguayo	7	956
3	El Signo	1	563
4	The Pegasus Kid	1	560
5	Aero Flash	1	282
6	Rambo	1	281
7	Sangre Chicana	2	237
8	Jushin Thunder Liger	1	183
9	Gran Hamada	2	163
10	The Great Sasuke	2	158
11	Fishman	2	137
12	Shinjiro Otani	1	87
13	Último Dragón	1	85
14	El Samurai	2	78
15	Chris Adams	1	56

== Combined reigns recognized by the WWF ==
Rank	Wrestler	No. of reigns	Combined days
1	Duane Gill/Gillberg	1	448
2	Dean Malenko	2	357
3	Taka Michinoku	1	315
4	X-Pac	2	243
5	Crash Holly	1	47
6	Jerry Lynn	1	37
7	Essa Rios	1	34
8	Christian	1	30
9	Jeff Hardy	1	20
10	Tajiri	1	13
11	Scotty 2 Hotty	1	8

== Combined reigns recognized by all companies ==
Rank	Wrestler	No. of reigns	Combined days
1	Villano III	7	2,040
2	Perro Aguayo	7	956
3	El Signo	1	563
4	The Pegasus Kid	1	560
5	Duane Gill/Gillberg	1	448
6	Dean Malenko	2	357
7	Taka Michinoku	1	315
8	Aero Flash	1	282
9	Rambo	1	281
10	X-Pac	2	243
11	Sangre Chicana	2	237
12	Jushin Thunder Liger	1	183
13	Gran Hamada	2	163
14	The Great Sasuke	2	158
15	Fishman	2	137
16	Shinjiro Otani	1	87
17	Último Dragón	1	85
18	El Samurai	2	78
19	Chris Adams	1	56
20	Crash Holly	1	47
21	Jerry Lynn	1	37
22	Essa Rios	1	34
23	Christian	1	30
24	Jeff Hardy	1	20
25	Tajiri	1	13
26	Scotty 2 Hotty	1	8

== See also ==
- WWE Cruiserweight Championship (1996–2007)
- List of WWE Cruiserweight Champions (1996–2007)
