= WPAZ =

- Pottstown, Pennsylvania; United States
- Broadcast area: Philadelphia, Pennsylvania
- Frequency: 1370 kHz
- Branding: Great Songs of the Faith

Programming
- Format: Christian, traditional hymns and songs

Ownership
- Owner: Four Rivers Community Broadcasting Corporation
- Sister stations: WBYO

History
- First air date: 1951
- Former call signs: WPAZ (1951–2011); WBZH (2011–2013)

Technical information
- Licensing authority: FCC
- Facility ID: 25002
- Class: D
- Power: 1,000 watts day; 52 watts night
- Transmitter coordinates: 40°16′35.35″N 75°37′42.67″W

Links
- Public license information: Public file; LMS
- Webcast: Listen live
- Website: www.wordfm.org/great-songs-of-the-faith

WPAZ (1370 AM) is a radio station owned by the Four Rivers Community Broadcasting Corporation. Licensed to Pottstown, Pennsylvania, United States, it serves Reading and the northwestern portions of the greater Philadelphia area (due to WNJC, which covers the southern portions of the metro at 1360).

== History ==
=== Beginnings ===
The station, which signed on in 1951, was originally owned by the Scott family, and later, their subsidiary, Great Scott Broadcasting, Inc. Over time, WPAZ became the flagship station for Great Scott Broadcasting, as corporate operations for its expanding group were handled out of the station's Maugers Mill Road studio location. During the period that Herb and Faye Scott owned the company, WPAZ was one of its strongest properties, despite the station's status as a daytime-only station for much of its existence.

WPAZ was a typical full-service station of its time, boasting music, local news and high school sports, local talk shows, church services, and remote broadcasts. Music formats varied from adult contemporary, oldies and adult standards.

Following Herb Scott's death in 1984, the company gradually shifted its focus from AM to FM by selling its properties in Ohio and western Pennsylvania, and acquiring signals in the Delmarva area. GSB corporate functions were later moved to Delaware after son Mitchell Scott assumed control of the stations after the turn of the 21st century. Nonetheless, WPAZ remained a part of Great Scott's portfolio.

WPAZ ceased operations on December 10, 2009, due to lack of sufficient revenue as Great Scott cited a focus on its other, more-profitable stations. Faye Scott died November 7, 2010.

=== Sale ===
In early 2010, a group of Pottstown area residents calling themselves the WPAZ Preservation Association (WPAZPA) began efforts to acquire WPAZ from Great Scott Broadcasting. The effort concluded with the group's announcing acquisition of the station in late October 2010. Resumption of station operations under the auspices of the Community Broadcasting Group (formed by the WPAZPA) took place shortly before 2 p.m. on December 30, 2010.

Having been dark for more than a year, the new operators found it difficult to find 'takers' willing to advertise on the new WPAZ. On October 28, 2011, WPAZ changed its call sign to WBZH. The station referred to itself as "The Buzz, 1370 AM". This did little to improve the station's fortunes. On Wednesday, November 14, 2012, the station went silent again due to lack of funding and control revered back to Four Rivers Community Broadcasting, which had backed the WPAZPA effort financially.

On January 25, 2013, the station changed back to the original WPAZ call sign. Mitchell Scott died of leukemia on March 17, 2013, at the age of 56.

On April 26, 2013, an application was filed with the FCC to change the License status of the station to non-commercial educational (NCE) which was approved by the FCC. On another special temporary authority application approved on August 7, 2013, a major cleanup and renovation project was completed along with the installation of a new transmitter and new processing equipment.

=== Today ===
On November 1, 2013, WPAZ returned to the air with a traditional Christian music format of religious hymns and songs. A translator on 103.5 FM (Pottstown) was added in November 2014.

== Translators ==
Broadcast translators for WPAZ
Call sign	Frequency	City of license	FID	ERP (W)	HAAT	Class	Transmitter coordinates	FCC info
W246CN	97.1 FM	Colmar, Pennsylvania	141452	250	49 m (161 ft)	D	40°14′18.3″N 75°18′58.6″W	LMS
W278BR	103.5 FM	Pottstown, Pennsylvania	141446	200	51.2 m (168 ft)	D	40°16′35.3″N 75°37′42.7″W	LMS
W279DC	103.7 FM	Red Hill, Pennsylvania	141465	30	134.9 m (443 ft)	D	40°20′33.3″N 75°27′29.6″W	LMS

== See also ==
- WBYO
