= WBZ =

WBZ may refer to:

- WBZ (AM), an AM radio station (1030 AM) in Boston
- WBZ-FM, an FM radio station (98.5 FM)
- WBZ-TV, a television station (channel 20, virtual 4)
