= WLHI =

Word FM station in Schnecksville, Pennsylvania

- Schnecksville, Pennsylvania; United States
- Broadcast area: Allentown/Bethlehem, Pennsylvania
- Frequency: 90.3 MHz
- Branding: Word FM

Programming
- Language: English
- Format: Contemporary Christian

Ownership
- Owner: Four Rivers Community Broadcasting Corporation

History
- First air date: May 31, 1969
- Former call signs: WXLV (1983–2013)

Technical information
- Licensing authority: FCC
- Facility ID: 36983
- Class: A
- ERP: 420 watts
- HAAT: 70 meters
- Transmitter coordinates: 40°39′43″N 75°36′41″W

Links
- Public license information: Public file; LMS
- Webcast: Listen Live
- Website: wordfm.org

WLHI (90.3 FM) is a radio station broadcasting a contemporary Christian music format. Licensed to Schnecksville, Pennsylvania, the station serves the Allentown/Bethlehem area of the Lehigh Valley region of eastern Pennsylvania. The station is currently owned by Four Rivers Community Broadcasting Corporation.

== History ==
On February 8, 2013, it was announced that the then-WXLV was sold by Lehigh Carbon Community College to Four Rivers Community Broadcasting Corporation for $705,000. The transaction was consummated on March 27, 2013. The new owner turned the station into a simulcast of Sellersville-based WBYO, also known as Word FM. WXLV went silent for approximately two weeks at the end of March before the format officially changed.

On April 4, 2013, the station changed its call sign to the current WLHI and began simulcasting Word FM.

== Translators ==
Broadcast translator for WLHI
| Call sign | Frequency | City of license | FID | ERP (W) | HAAT | Class | FCC info |
|---|---|---|---|---|---|---|---|
| W293BW | 106.5 FM | Allentown, Pennsylvania | 157515 | 250 | −8 m (−26 ft) | D | LMS |

== See also ==
- Media in the Lehigh Valley
- WBYO
