= Lehigh Carbon Community College =

Public college in Schnecksville, Pennsylvania, US

Coordinates: 40.665144°N 75.608167°W

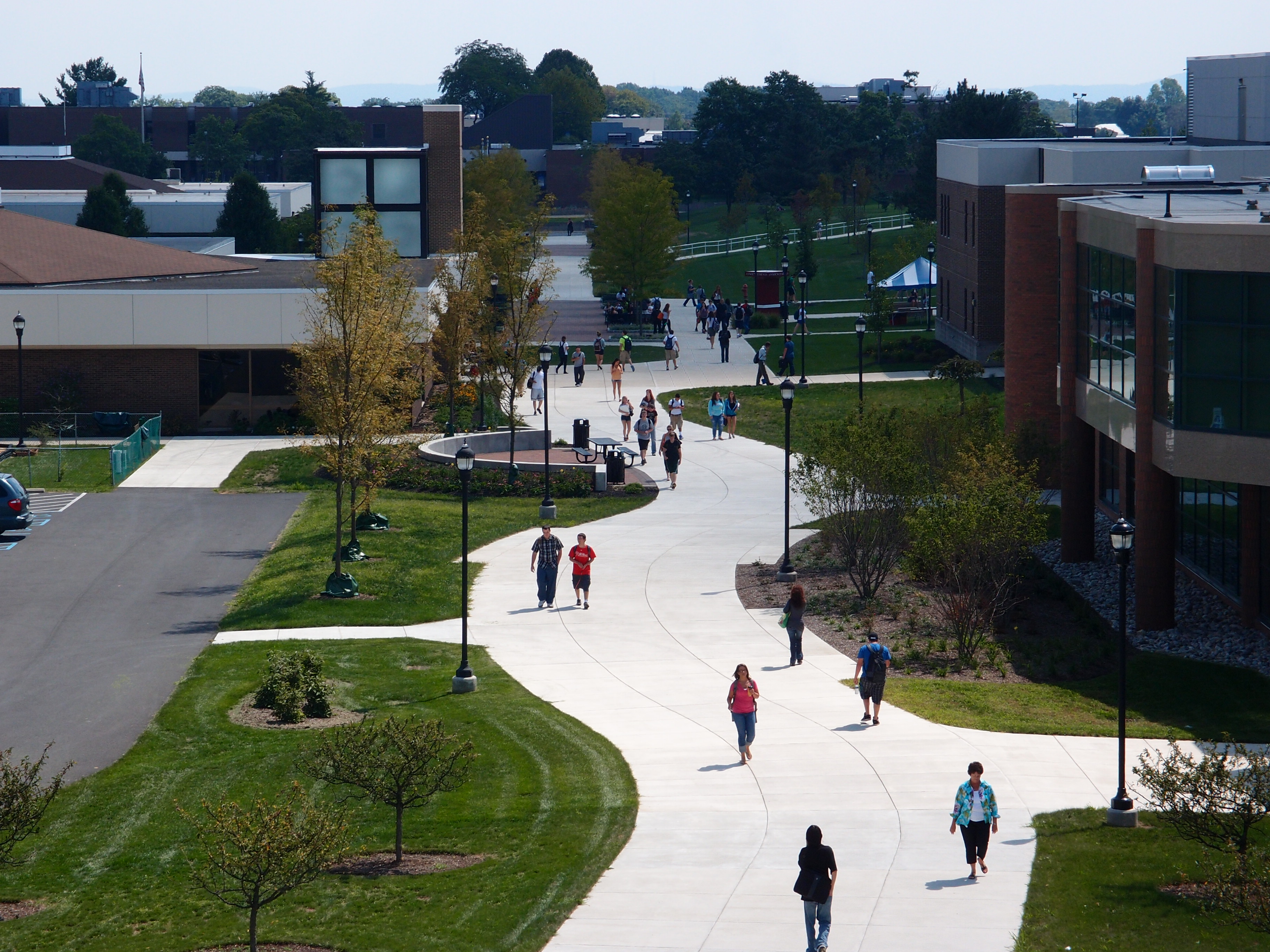
- Lehigh Carbon Community College's main campus in Schnecksville, Pennsylvania in August 2012
- Type: Public community college
- Established: March 31, 1966
- President: Ann D. Bieber
- Faculty: 424
- Students: 2,733 full time 4,451 part time
- Location: Schnecksville, Pennsylvania, U.S., U.S.
- Campus: 153 acres (0.62 km^{2})
- Colors: Maroon, gold, white
- Nickname: Cougars
- Sporting affiliations: NJCAA – EPAC, Division III (non-conference)
- Website: lccc.edu

Lehigh Carbon Community College (LCCC), often pronounced "L-tri-C," is an American public community college with a main campus in Schnecksville, Pennsylvania, in the Lehigh Valley region of eastern Pennsylvania. The college also maintains satellite campuses in Allentown, also in the Lehigh Valley, and Tamaqua in Schuylkill County.

The school serves as the primary granter of associate degrees in the Allentown metropolitan area.

== History ==
=== 20th century ===
LCCC was founded on March 31, 1966 as Lehigh County Community College. It originally held classes in the former Lehigh County Courthouse. In 1972, modern facilities were built, creating the foundation for the current campus of this academic institution. College administrators selected the school's current name in 1994 with the goal of increasing enrollment from nearby Carbon County.

=== 21st century ===
Until its sale in 2013, the college operated a campus radio station, WLHI, which was streamed globally on iHeartRadio.

As of 2025, the college maintains learning centers at two additional off-campus locations: the Donley Center in Allentown, and the John Morgan Center in Tamaqua. They previously operated the Carbon Center in Jim Thorpe, which was closed in 2020 due to a lack of enrollment and an increasing number of students taking classes online.
