= Holly Cousins =

Professional wrestling tag team

- Crash Holly (left), Molly Holly (center), and Hardcore Holly (right).

Tag team
- Members: Crash Holly; Hardcore Holly; Molly Holly
- Name(s): The Hollys; The Holly Cousins; The Super Heavyweights
- Billed heights: 5 ft 9 in (1.75 m) - Crash Holly; 6 ft 0 in (1.83 m) - Hardcore Holly; 5 ft 4 in (1.63 m) - Molly Holly
- Combined billed weight: 449 lb (204 kg)
- Billed from: Mobile, Alabama
- Former members: Too Cool
- Debut: August 16, 1999
- Disbanded: December 2001
- Years active: 1999-2001

The Holly Cousins, also known as the Hollys, were a professional wrestling tag team and, later, stable in the World Wrestling Federation between 1999 and 2001. It consisted of on-screen cousins Crash Holly, Hardcore Holly and Molly Holly.

== History ==
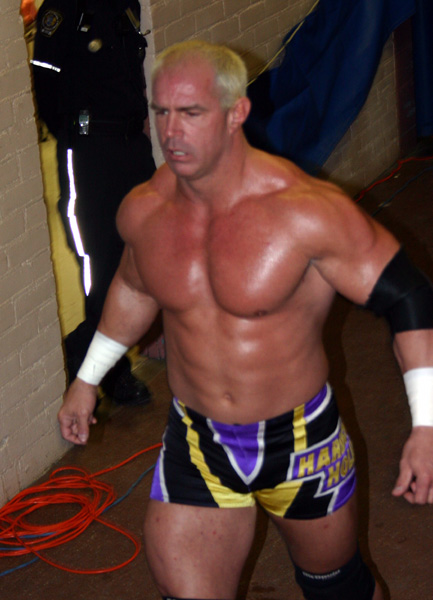
Hardcore Holly, one third of the Holly Cousins.

=== First run ===
Hardcore, who had debuted in the World Wrestling Federation in 1994, introduced his on-screen "cousin" Crash Holly on August 16, 1999. After arguing over who was the toughest Holly cousin, the pair brawled all over the arena for the rest of the show. They teamed up for the first time at SummerSlam, and spent the next few weeks alternating between being rivals and partners. From September on, the cousins started teaming together full-time, during which time they took to the gimmick of claiming themselves to be well over 400 lb (180 kg), so they could be considered "superheavyweights".

On October 18, 1999, on Raw is War, Crash and Hardcore won the WWF World Tag Team Championship together, defeating the Rock 'n' Sock Connection, after Mankind refused to tag into the match, and Triple H interfered. They held the title for two weeks before dropping it back to Mankind and his new partner Al Snow on the November 4 episode of SmackDown!.

=== Hardcore title chase and break-up ===
In early 2000, the Holly cousins began feuding over the Hardcore title. Hardcore had first won the title in early 1999, before Crash's debut; however, Crash won it on February 22, 2000, defeating Test. The pair soon started fighting each other for the title including in the "hardcore" Battle royal at WrestleMania 2000, where Crash started off as the champion, but Hardcore left as champion. Crash regained the title the day after WrestleMania, and soon after this, the Holly cousins had their last match as a team for over six months.

During these months Crash concentrated on the hardcore division, winning the title 22 times (after introducing the infamous "24/7 rule"), and earning the nickname "the Houdini of Hardcore". Hardcore legitimately broke his arm in a match against Kurt Angle and was sidelined for most of this time.

=== Reformation ===
In October 2000, Crash started feuding with Test and Albert. This set up the debut of another "cousin", Molly Holly. She debuted on November 6, 2000, on Raw, attacking Trish Stratus, who was managing T&A. This led to the Holly Cousins reuniting to feud with T & A and their manager, Trish Stratus.

Although Hardcore and Crash had opportunities to win the Tag Team championship, they were never able to capitalize. They competed mainly in both the hardcore division and the tag title division for the next few months. Molly had multiple opportunities to win the Women's title, but was booked to lose them all.

In early 2001, the Hollys began feuding with the Dudley Boyz. In May 2001, Crash and Hardcore, along with Bubba and D-Von Dudley became concerned about Molly's burgeoning relationship with Spike Dudley. This led to the Hollys-Dudleys feud intensifying, with both Spike and Molly caught in the middle. On May 28, 2001, the Dudley Boys famously put Molly through a table, with Spike lying on the table to try to protect her. As Molly and Spike's relationship progressed, the feud between the Hollys and the Dudleys worsened. Molly started accompanying Spike for his matches. They remained as a team until September 2001. Their last match together happened in December 2001.

Crash joined the Raw brand until 2003.

Originally the Hollys were supposed to reunite on September 2, 2002 when Crash revealed that he was the one who was leaving Raw, and planning to join his cousin Hardcore on SmackDown!. This never happened because Hardcore injured his neck that September. Hardcore was out of wrestling for over a year.

=== Aftermath ===
Crash competed on Raw and later traded to SmackDown! until his release from WWE on June 30, 2003. He later died on November 6, 2003 from suicide. Molly eventually dumped Spike, and went on to become a two-time Women's champion. On April 12, 2005, Molly left the company and retired from full-time wrestling. Hardcore was the final Holly to be released from the company, on January 16, 2009.

== Championships and accomplishments ==
- World Wrestling Federation
  - WWF Tag Team Championship (1 time)
