= Rock 'n' Sock Connection =

Professional wrestling tag team

- The Rock (left) and Mankind (right) as the WWF Tag Team Champions

Tag team
- Name(s): Rock 'n' Sock Connection; Rock 'n' Sock
- Members: The Rock; Mankind / Mick Foley
- Billed heights: 6 ft 5 in (196 cm) – The Rock; 6 ft 2 in (188 cm) – Mick Foley
- Combined billed weight: 562 lb (255 kg)
- Debut: August 30, 1999
- Years active: 1999–2004

The Rock 'n' Sock Connection was a professional wrestling tag team of The Rock and Mankind/Mick Foley who wrestled in the World Wrestling Federation (WWF) between 1999 and 2000 and briefly in 2004. As a team, they held the WWF Tag Team Championship three times.

== History ==
Ever since 1998's Survivor Series and the "Deadly Game Tournament", The Rock and Mankind had been rivals, facing each other on numerous occasions, mostly fighting for the WWF Championship. The Rock, the Corporate Champion for Mr. McMahon's Corporation, was the exact opposite of Mankind in almost every way. The Rock was athletic, charismatic, and well-dressed, while Mankind was a rugged, deranged, and unpredictable madman. Mankind wore a dirty and foul-smelling sock on his hand and used it as a weapon, sending it straight into the mouths of those that wronged him; the odor and taste of Mankind’s filthy sock, combined with his finishing move, the mandible claw, would render his opponents unconscious.

Their feud ended after the Rock won his third WWF Championship against Mankind in a ladder match on the February 15, 1999, episode of Raw Is War. However, Mankind became the special-guest referee in the title match at WrestleMania XV which involved The Rock and Stone Cold Steve Austin. The Rock went on to be fired from the Corporation in mid 1999 and would not cross paths with Mankind for quite a while. Even though their feud was over, animosity still reigned supreme for these two superstars.

On August 30, 1999, the Rock 'n' Sock Connection was formed when The Undertaker and Big Show attacked The Rock on Raw Is War, leading The Rock to challenge both of them to a match. At the time, it was considered career "suicide" to face a team as deadly as The Undertaker and Big Show. With this in mind, Mankind (who used a smelly sock named "Mr. Socko" as part of his gimmick) asked his former enemy if he could help with his fight against The Undertaker and Big Show. The Rock reluctantly accepted, and later that night the two captured The Undertaker and Big Show's WWF Tag Team Championship when they pinned Big Show after a double People's Elbow.

They lost the belts on September 9, 1999, on SmackDown! in a Buried Alive match against The Undertaker and Big Show, when Triple H interfered. However, Triple H was really only helping out The Undertaker, as he hit Big Show with a sledgehammer.

On the September 20 episode of Raw Is War, the Rock 'n' Sock Connection won the titles back in a "Dark Side Rules" match against Big Show, Mideon, and Viscera (The Undertaker did not feel like being in the match so they took his place, thus turning the match into a three-on-two). Three days later on SmackDown!, the New Age Outlaws reunited and challenged Rock 'n' Sock Connection for the titles, which the Outlaws won.

Several days later, Mick Foley and Dwayne Johnson helped Raw Is War achieve its highest rating ever with a segment featuring himself (as Mankind) and The Rock. The "This is Your Life" segment aired on September 27, 1999, and received an 8.4 rating. Two weeks later, The Rock told Mankind that he was tired of him, did not like the whole Rock 'n' Sock team, nor did he enjoy Mankind stealing his catchphrases during promos. Mankind begged The Rock to team up with him for one more night, but did not tell The Rock who they would be fighting.

They ended up challenging the New Age Outlaws for the championships on the October 14, 1999, episode of SmackDown!. That night, the Rock 'n' Sock Connection won the tag team titles for the third and final time, meaning they would have to continue teaming together to defend the titles. Four days later on Raw is War, before their title defense against the Holly Cousins, Mick Foley gave the Rock an autographed copy of his book, Have a Nice Day!, but later found it in the trash. Mick confronted The Rock and cursed him out for throwing away his life's work. Later that night, during their match, a crushed Mankind refused to participate as he sat despondently on the steel steps, facing away from the ring, as Hardcore and Crash Holly (with outside interference once again by Triple H) beat The Rock for the tag team titles.

The Rock and Mankind resumed their rivalry, which continued until the storyline revealed that Al Snow had discarded the book, as it contained numerous jokes at his expense. Outside of the storyline, Foley and Snow have maintained a long-standing friendship, frequently referencing each other humorously in interviews and public appearances..

=== Reunions and legacy ===
The Rock 'n' Sock Connection later reunited in November 1999, when Mankind helped The Rock defeat Prince Albert and Big Boss Man. On the Thanksgiving episode of SmackDown!, The Rock 'n' Sock Connection defeated the Hollys to become number one contenders to the WWF Tag Team Championship. They faced the New Age Outlaws for the titles in December at Armageddon but were unsuccessful in winning the titles after Al Snow interfered. After the match, The Rock got revenge by giving Snow a Rock Bottom and People's Elbow.

The Rock 'n' Sock would later reunite in late 1999 to take on the McMahon-Helmsley Faction. Upon opposition, Triple H, then the WWF Champion, would place those two in a Pink-Slip-on-a-Pole match, where the loser will be fired from the WWF (kayfabe). Mankind lost the match, thus resulting in termination. However, a few days after Mankind's firing, The Rock was interviewed and finally announced that he acknowledged and respected Mankind's hard work with the company, mentioning that the Faction was abusing power. The Rock even went so far as to rally the entire WWF roster on the January 10, 2000 Raw Is War episode to demand Mankind's reinstatement, which Triple H complied and did. Foley reverted into his Cactus Jack character in early 2000 and continued to team with The Rock, but since Cactus Jack did not use a smelly sock as part of his gimmick, the team was not officially called “Rock 'n' Sock“ during this time. Foley then retired in March 2000 and The Rock saw his movie career blossom, pausing the Rock and Sock connection.

During the December 8, 2003, episode of Raw, The Rock aided Mick Foley once again during his confrontation with La Resistance. La Resistance briefly overpowered a distracted Foley and The Rock, as The Rock berated Foley for referring to the team as "The Sock 'n' Rock Connection". The pair soon regained their composure taking down the French duo, with The Rock allowing Foley to deliver the final "People's Elbow", but soon berated him again as Foley attempted to use one of The Rock's catchphrases.

In 2004, The Rock 'n' Sock Connection reunited at WrestleMania XX when they took on then Evolution members Randy Orton, Ric Flair, and Batista in a 3-on-2 handicap match. However, the Rock 'n' Sock Connection lost the match when Orton pinned Foley after an RKO. The Rock was released by WWE later that year, retired, and went into full-time acting. Foley wrestled part-time and worked as a commentator for WWE until August 2008.

Foley was confirmed to appear on the November 14, 2011, episode of Raw "Rock Reunion" for a possible reunion of Rock 'n' Sock Connection, before The Rock's in-ring return at Survivor Series. They both appeared on that edition of Raw only for Rock to Rock Bottom Foley and leave. On Raw's 20th Anniversary, Mick Foley was greeted by his friend The Rock. The two hugged each other before being interrupted by Vickie Guerrero. Foley was puzzled as to why The Rock didn't talk back, then The Rock said to trust him and watch The Rock Concert. The two then exchanged hugs once more, and The Rock congratulated Foley for his impending WWE Hall of Fame induction and wished him well.

The team of Sasha Banks and Bayley, two of the four members of The Four Horsewomen, has used the name The Boss 'n' Hug Connection, as a tribute to the Rock 'n' Sock Connection.

== Championships and accomplishments ==
- World Wrestling Federation
  - WWF Tag Team Championship (3 times)
