= WNJC =

- Washington Township, New Jersey; United States
- Broadcast area: South Jersey
- Frequency: 1360 kHz
- Branding: Súper 1360 AM

Programming
- Format: Defunct (was variety)

Ownership
- Owner: Forsythe Broadcasting, LLC

History
- First air date: 1946; 80 years ago
- Last air date: 2023; 3 years ago
- Former call signs: WWBZ (1946–90); WVSJ (1990–92)
- Call sign meaning: "New Jersey Country" (former format)

Technical information
- Licensing authority: FCC
- Facility ID: 22058
- Class: B
- Power: 5,000 watts (day); 800 watts (night)
- Transmitter coordinates: 39°31′6.4″N 75°5′10.6″W

Links
- Public license information: Public file; LMS
- Website: www.super1360wnjc.com

WNJC (1360 AM) was a radio station broadcasting variety and brokered programming. Licensed to Washington Township, New Jersey, it served the southeastern portions of the Philadelphia radio market (due to WPAZ, which covers the northwestern portions of the metro at 1370), and was owned by Forsythe Broadcasting, LLC.

== History ==
The station originally bore the callsign WWBZ and was licensed to Vineland, New Jersey. WWBZ operated from 1946 to 1989, then went silent. On September 1, 1990, it moved to, and petitioned to change its city of license to Washington Township and returned to the air as WVSJ ("Voice of South Jersey"), carrying mostly talk programming. WVSJ was one of the first Philadelphia-area stations to carry Rush Limbaugh on weekdays, but lost rights to the program when it was picked up by WWDB. In 1992, the station adopted a country music format and became WNJC ("New Jersey Country"), shifted to Spanish language programming by 1994, then evolved into a brokered format.

In 1994, the station was purchased by radio engineer Michael Venditti and his partner John Forsythe to create Forsythe Broadcasting, LLC. Michael Venditti died of cancer in April 1998 and his wife Joan took over as partner. In 2004 Duke Hamann was hired as the station Engineer. The studio was located on 1893 Hurffville Rd. in Deptford from 1994 till 2005. In November 2005, the station moved to 123 Egg Harbor Rd. in Washington Township, where it remained until May 2017.

In June 2017, the station was rescued from going dark by Duke Hamann, Antonio Muniz and Javier Machorro. The studio was relocated to Cherry Hill then moved to Camden two years later. The station was marketed as a multicultural station. Spanish-language during the daytime hours and followed by English-language "Today's Hits & Yesterday's favorites" along with brokered programming.

In 2023, WNJC lost its tower lease; its programming remained available through its web site. The Federal Communications Commission cancelled the station’s license on May 16, 2024.
