= Metroblogging =

Former media website

Metroblogging was an online local media project founded by Jason DeFillippo and Sean Bonner. Starting in Los Angeles in November 2003, the project included 57 city-specific blogs around the world, with close to 700 contributors.

== History ==
The first post on blogging.la was on November 30, 2003. When it started, it was intended as a group blog where a number of bloggers from Los Angeles could talk about the city as they saw it. Following the success of blogging.la, Bonner and DeFillippo considered expanding to Orange County, California, but in the end started an international network, which would be known as Metroblogging.

Bonner and DeFillippo enlisted a team of bloggers for each of the four initial Metroblogging sites (San Francisco, New York City, London and Chicago). Over the next year, Metroblogging added another thirty city sites to its network. As weblogs started to become an increasingly popular source of first person accounts for news events circa 2005, Metroblogging provided such content.

=== July 2005 London bombings ===
During both bombings upon the London mass-transit system. Metroblogging London became a hub for sharing news and first person accounts of the bombings.

=== Hurricane Katrina ===
When Hurricane Katrina struck the Gulf Coast of the United States in August 2005 Metroblogging New Orleans provided first hand accounts of the destruction.

The writers for Metroblogging New Orleans reported on the anarchy days before any of the major news outlets did. They reported on the dire needs and conditions and questioned the lack of reaction by city, state, and federal officials before others were aware of the extent of the crisis.

They corrected the mainstream media in some of its reporting. While the media was reporting that the French Quarter of New Orleans was under 10 to 12 feet (3.7 m) of water, Metroblogging New Orleans reported that the French Quarter was not flooded and had remained mostly dry.

=== Kashmir earthquake ===
The members of Metroblogging Karachi and Metroblogging Lahore contributed to the relief efforts by extensively networking with NGOs and other working groups following the 2005 Kashmir earthquake.

=== Dawson College Shooting ===
The Dawson College Shooting, in Montreal, affected the entire city and many people wrote about it. One writer, who worked for Dawson College, wrote about his experience of what happened on September 13, 2006.
