= Cathy Dingman =

American professional wrestler (born 1970)

Personal information
- Born: Catherine Dingman; December 9, 1970 (age 55) Alabama, U.S.

Professional wrestling career
- Ring name: Barbara Bush BB; Taylor Vaughan
- Billed height: 5 ft 8 in (1.73 m)
- Billed weight: 147 lb (67 kg)
- Trained by: Kimberly Page
- Debut: 1998
- Retired: June 2003

Catherine Dingman (born December 9, 1970), known under the ring name Barbara Bush or B.B., is an American professional wrestler. She is best known for her work in the World Wrestling Federation, World Championship Wrestling and Total Nonstop Action Wrestling.

== Professional wrestling career ==
=== Independent Circuit ===
Cathy's most notable time on the independent circuit was in the IWF as "Cosuin Brandy Mae" acting as valet for Hillbilly Cuzin Ray and later the Tennessee Mountain Boys.

=== World Wrestling Federation (1999–2000) ===
In the WWF, Dingman began appearing as a rescuer in several segments, including an October episode of SmackDown! where she helped free Road Dogg's leg from a bear trap. Dingman also appeared at Survivor Series when Tori was hit by X-Pac and after Steve Austin was hit by a car. She later appeared on the Thanksgiving episode of SmackDown! after the first-ever Gravy Bowl match between Ivory and Jacqueline with Miss Kitty as the special guest referee. Dingman stepped in to help Kitty as she was choking with the Heimlich maneuver. Ivory attacked Cathy, ripping off her EMT shirt.

On the following episode of Raw, Michael Cole introduced Cathy Dingman as Barbara Bush, or "B.B." to her friends, and challenged Ivory to an Evening Gown match. Ivory came out and accused her of just trying to win over the crowd by calling them "perverts." The two came to blows and Ivory got the better of B.B. by ripping off her shirt.[5] The following week, Michael Cole was scheduled to interview B.B., but Ivory interrupted the interview by saying that what BB lacked was intelligence, which she used for her breast size.[6] At Armageddon, B.B. competed in the Evening Gown Pool match for the WWF Women's Championship but was the second to be eliminated after being stripped by Ivory and Miss Kitty. On the December 20 episode of Raw, a "Holiday Topless Top-Rope match" took place; B.B. was in Val Venis' corner while Terri was in Hardcore Holly's corner. Venis was thrown out of the ring twice and so B.B. was forced to strip. As she was about to remove her topless outfit, Triple H intervened, blocking the public's view of B.B.'s breasts.

Three weeks later, Jerry Lawler welcomed B.B. and the other Miss Royal Rumble Swimsuit Competition contestants to the ring for an interview. B.B. told Lawler and the fans that she was sure the fans would want to see "bigger" referring to her breasts.[10] At the Royal Rumble, Lawler joked that the crowd called him the "Burger King" but B.B. had "big size" again referring to B.B.'s breasts.[11] The match was won by Mae Young who was crowned Miss Royal Rumble. The next night on Raw, B.B. was one of the lumberjills in the first Snow Bunny match between The Kat and Harvey "Hervina" Wippleman.

On February 10, Edge and Christian faced The Dudley Boyz. After the match, Bubba Ray Dudley appeared injured and was treated by paramedics. This turned out to be a plan to powerbomb B.B. through a table. That was B.B.'s last appearance before being released.

=== World Championship Wrestling (2000) ===
Dingman joined WCW as Papaya, playing Kwee Wee's wife and valet, making only two appearances before leaving the company.

=== Total Nonstop Action Wrestling (2002) ===
In 2002, Dingman appeared in Total Nonstop Action Wrestling as Taylor Vaughn. Vaughn competed in and won the Miss TNA Lingerie Battle Royal that included nine other wrestlers including Francine Fournier, Elektra, Shannon Spruill and Alexis Laree. After the match, Francine returned to the ring and whipped Vaughn with Ed Ferrera's belt. The following week, the two faced off and Francine grabbed a leather strap from her boot and began to strangle Vaughn. Referee Scott Armstrong grabbed the strap, which Vaughn grabbed and hit Francine with, resulting in her disqualification. On July 31, Don West crowned Taylor Vaughn "Miss TNA". Bruce interrupted and said he wanted to be treated with respect and become Miss TNA, challenging Vaughn to a match which she won. The following week, Taylor Vaughn attempted to reclaim her crown by challenging Bruce once again to an Evening Gown match, losing.

== Championships and accomplishments ==
- Total Nonstop Action Wrestling
  - Miss TNA (1 time)
