= The Skydiving-J =

1996 professional wrestling event in Japan

- Promotion: New Japan Pro-Wrestling
- Date: June 17, 1996
- City: Tokyo, Japan
- Venue: Nippon Budokan
- Attendance: 13,500

The Skydiving-J was a professional wrestling event produced by New Japan Pro-Wrestling (NJPW). The event took place on June 17, 1996 at the Nippon Budokan in Tokyo, Japan. The event was notable for revolutionizing junior heavyweight wrestling in NJPW and Japanese wrestling history. The event aired on television on TV Asahi on July 6, 1996. All of the matches contested at the event were junior heavyweight championship matches from different promotions from Japan. This was a very significant event in the revolution of junior heavyweight wrestling as title defences from various promotions at the event would result in the unification of various junior heavyweight championships to create the J-Crown.

Eight professional wrestling matches were contested at the event and all of the matches were contested for various junior heavyweight championships from all over Japan. In the main event, The Great Sasuke successfully defended the IWGP Junior Heavyweight Championship against Black Tiger. Six of the titles were retained at the event while two championships changed hands at the event as Jushin Thunder Liger defeated Dick Togo to capture the British Commonwealth Junior Heavyweight Championship while Shinjiro Otani defeated Kazushi Sakuraba for the vacant UWA World Junior Light Heavyweight Championship.

== Background ==
NJPW had previously held an annual round-robin tournament called Best of the Super Juniors but the tournament was not of much significance for the junior heavyweight division. In 1994, Jushin Thunder Liger conceptualized a junior heavyweight tournament to determine the best junior heavyweights from all over the world called Super J-Cup. The tournament was an enormous success and it led to a second tournament being held the following year in 1995.

== Event ==
Other on-screen personnel
Role:	Name:
Commentators	Masa Saito
Commentators	Yoshinari Tsuji
Commentators	Soichi Shibata
Commentators	Yuichi Tabata
Commentators	Yu Manabe
Commentators	Jushin Thunder Liger

=== Preliminary matches ===
In the opening match, the team of Lance Storm and Yuji Yasuraoka defended the WAR International Junior Heavyweight Tag Team Championship against the team of El Samurai and Norio Honaga. Storm pinned Honaga following a hurricanrana to retain the titles.

Next, Masayoshi Motegi defended the NWA World Junior Heavyweight Championship against Shiryu. In the end, Motegi delivered a top rope gutwrench suplex to Shiryu to retain the title.

Next, Gran Hamada defended the WWA World Junior Light Heavyweight Championship against Tatsuhito Takaiwa. In the end, Hamada executed a tornado DDT on Takaiwa to win the match and retain the title.

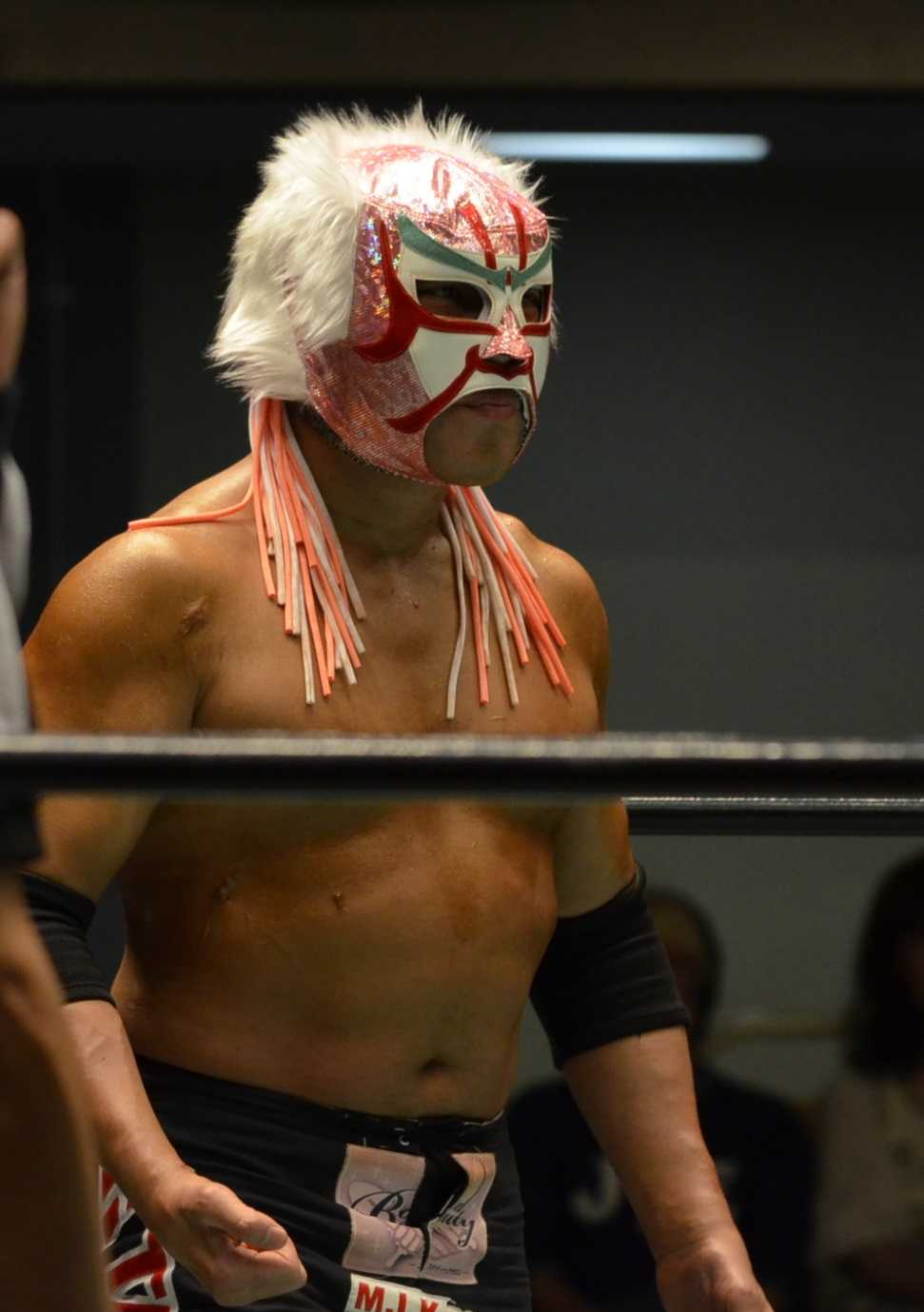
The Great Sasuke defended the IWGP Junior Heavyweight Championship against Black Tiger in the main event.

The next match was contested for the vacant UWA World Junior Light Heavyweight Championship between Kazushi Sakuraba and Shinjiro Otani. In the end, Otani applied a chickenwing facelock on Sakuraba and made him submit to the hold to win the title.

Next, Super Delfin defended the CMLL World Welterweight Championship against Taka Michinoku. In the end, Delfin performed a double chickenwing suplex to Michinoku to retain the title.

Later, Último Dragón defended the WAR International Junior Heavyweight Championship against Gran Naniwa. Dragón pinned Naniwa with a crucifix to retain the title.

In the penultimate match, Dick Togo defended the British Commonwealth Junior Heavyweight Championship against Jushin Thunder Liger. In the end, Liger delivered a Shotei to Togo to win the title.

=== Main event match ===
In the main event, The Great Sasuke defended the IWGP Junior Heavyweight Championship against Black Tiger. Sasuke executed a top rope frankensteiner to Tiger to retain the title.

== Aftermath ==
The all-junior heavyweight card featuring junior heavyweight championship matches of all major Japanese promotions led to Jushin Thunder Liger conceptualizing the idea of a tournament to unify all the junior heavyweight singles championships. He challenged all the champions and a tournament took place to create the J-Crown, the unifier of various singles junior heavyweight championships. The tournament took place on August 5, 1996, with The Great Sasuke winning the tournament to become the first champion.

== Results ==
No.	Results	Stipulations	Times
1	Lance Storm and Yuji Yasuraoka (c) defeated El Samurai and Norio Honaga	Tag team match for the WAR International Junior Heavyweight Tag Team Championship	13:28
2	Masayoshi Motegi (c) defeated Shiryu	Singles match for the NWA World Junior Heavyweight Championship	11:51
3	Gran Hamada (c) defeated Tatsuhito Takaiwa	Singles match for the WWA World Junior Light Heavyweight Championship	12:05
4	Shinjiro Otani defeated Kazushi Sakuraba	Singles match for the vacant UWA World Junior Light Heavyweight Championship	8:15
5	Super Delfin (c) defeated Taka Michinoku	Singles match for the CMLL World Welterweight Championship	16:09
6	Último Dragón (c) defeated Gran Naniwa	Singles match for the WAR International Junior Heavyweight Championship	13:58
7	Jushin Liger defeated Dick Togo (c)	Singles match for the British Commonwealth Junior Heavyweight Championship	15:56
8	The Great Sasuke (c) defeated Black Tiger	Singles match for the IWGP Junior Heavyweight Championship	16:54
(c) / – the champion(s) heading into the match
