= Jushin Liger =

Japanese retired professional wrestler (born 1964)

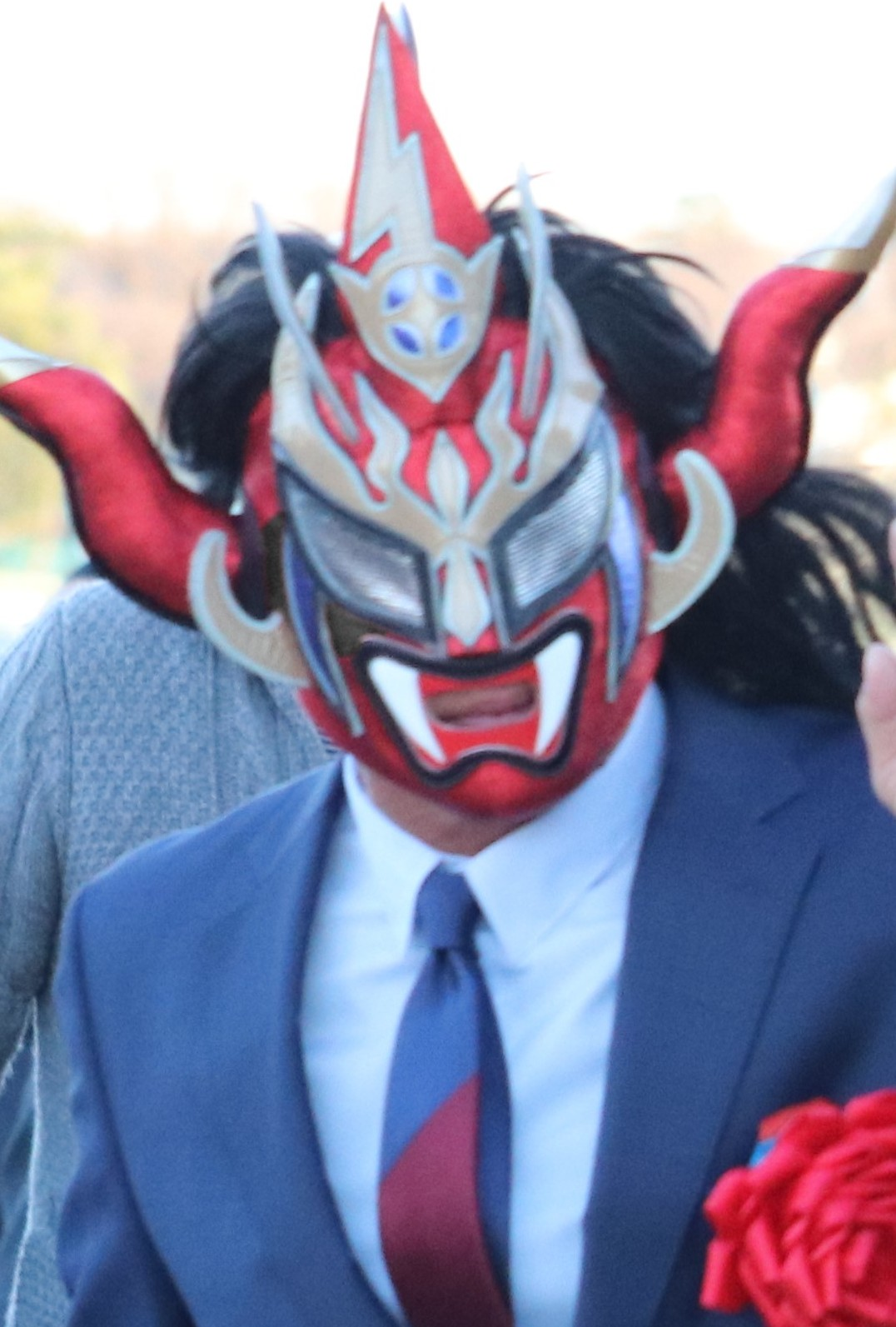
- Liger in 2019

Personal information
- Born: Keiichi Yamada; November 10, 1964 (age 61) Hiroshima, Japan

Professional wrestling career
- Ring names: C.T.U Ranger Yellow; Fuji Yamada; Jushin Liger; Jushin Thunder Liger; Keiichi Yamada; Kishin Liger Liger
- Billed height: 1.70 m (5 ft 7 in)
- Billed weight: 95.1 kg (210 lb)
- Billed from: Tokyo, Japan
- Trained by: Antonio Inoki; Kotetsu Yamamoto; Tatsumi Fujinami; Yoshiaki Fujiwara; Stu Hart; Tokyo Joe
- Debut: March 3, 1984
- Retired: January 5, 2020

Keiichi Yamada (山田恵一, Yamada Keiichi; born November 10, 1964), better known as Jushin Liger (獣神ライガー, Jūshin Raigā) and later Jushin Thunder Liger (獣神サンダー・ライガー, Jūshin Sandā Raigā), (Note: Often transliterated as "Jushin Thunder Liger". However, both NJPW and Yamada himself use the form "Jyushin Thunder Liger". Other variations such as Jushin Lyger and Jyushin Lyger have also been used.) is a Japanese retired professional wrestler and mixed martial artist, signed to New Japan Pro-Wrestling (NJPW) as a trainer. He is the longest-tenured member of the NJPW roster, having worked for the company since his professional wrestling debut in 1984. Throughout his career, which spanned three-and-a-half decades, he wrestled over 4,000 matches and performed in major events for various promotions across the globe.

Debuting under his real name for NJPW in 1984, he was given the gimmick of Jushin Liger in 1989, based on the anime series of the same name. Becoming Jushin "Thunder" Liger the following year, he saw unprecedented success in the junior heavyweight division when he won the IWGP Junior Heavyweight Championship a record 11 times and set the record for its longest reign during his sixth reign, which lasted for 628 days. Liger was the first three-time Best of the Super Juniors tournament winner (a record eventually tied by Koji Kanemoto and Hiromu Takahashi), is a former six-time IWGP Junior Heavyweight Tag Team Champion, won the Super J Cup twice (in 1995 and 2000), and was inducted into the Wrestling Observer Newsletter Hall of Fame in 1999. Liger also wrestled the opening match for the first January 4 Tokyo Dome Show in 1992. He is frequently cited as one of the greatest junior heavyweight wrestlers of all time. He was also inducted into the WWE Hall of Fame Class of 2020.

Yamada had his retirement match at Wrestle Kingdom 14 on January 5, 2020, 35 years after his career began, and has since been working as a trainer in the New Japan Dojo and as a commentator.

== Professional wrestling career ==
=== New Japan Pro-Wrestling (1984–1986) ===
Keiichi Yamada was born in Hiroshima on November 10, 1964. He was an amateur wrestler during his high school years. In his senior year, he lost to Toshiaki Kawada in the finals of a national championship tournament. After graduating high school in the early 1980s, he would apply to New Japan Pro-Wrestling's (NJPW) dojo in the hope of becoming a professional wrestler. He was not accepted because he did not meet the height requirements the dojo had at that time. Yamada, determined not to give up his dream of becoming a professional wrestler, left for Mexico and began his training there. By his own account, he was almost starving while studying in Mexico, due to this NJPW officials who were visiting took pity on him and asked him to come back to Japan to train in their dojo. In the NJPW dojo, he trained alongside the likes of Keiji Mutoh, Masahiro Chono and Shinya Hashimoto. While continuing his training, he had his debut match in March 1984 at the age of 19, wrestling against Shunji Kosugi. He began studying various martial arts styles because he wanted to add something new and different to his wrestling style, which is how he learned his Abisegeri kick. In 1985, Yamada participated in the Young Lion Cup and got to the final of the tournament before being defeated by Shunji Kosugi. In the beginning of 1986, Yamada participated in the IWGP Junior Heavyweight Championship League but lost to Black Tiger. Yamada won the 1986 Young Lion Cup by defeating Tatsutoshi Goto in the tournament final on March 26. On July 19, 1986, Yamada faced Nobuhiko Takada in a losing effort in his first of many IWGP Junior Heavyweight Championship matches.

=== All Star Wrestling, BWF (1986–1987, 1989, 2014) ===
After winning the Young Lion Cup in March 1986, he went on an excursion of Europe, where he wrestled for All Star Wrestling in England, under the name "Flying" Fuji Yamada. He won the World Heavy Middleweight Championship twice, once in September 1986 and once in March 1987, both times defeating "Rollerball" Mark Rocco and both times losing it back to him, the last of these four title changes being televised on ITV. Yamada would later visit All Star again in 1989, with tag partner Flying Funaki. During this period, he also worked for Orig Williams' BWF, making appearances on Williams' Reslo wrestling show for Welsh-language TV channel S4C. He returned to Britain in 2014 to work once again for All Star Wrestling, this time under his masked Jushin Liger identity.

=== Germany CWA (1992–1993) ===
Yamada, as Liger, defeated Franz Schumann at the CWA Euro Catch Festival 1992 edition in Bremen 19 December 1992 in a match held under the full European rounds system. At the December 18, 1993 event, again in Bremen, Liger failed to capture the CWA Intercontinental Heavyweight Championship after going to a ten-round draw with champion Fit Finlay.

=== Stampede Wrestling (1987, 1989) ===
Yamada went on an excursion in Canada, around May 1987, where he wrestled in Stu Hart's Stampede Wrestling in Calgary under his real name. He also trained under Hart in the "Dungeon". His experiences there led him to refer to Hart as a "very, very tough man."

=== Return to NJPW ===
==== Return and character change (1987–1989) ====
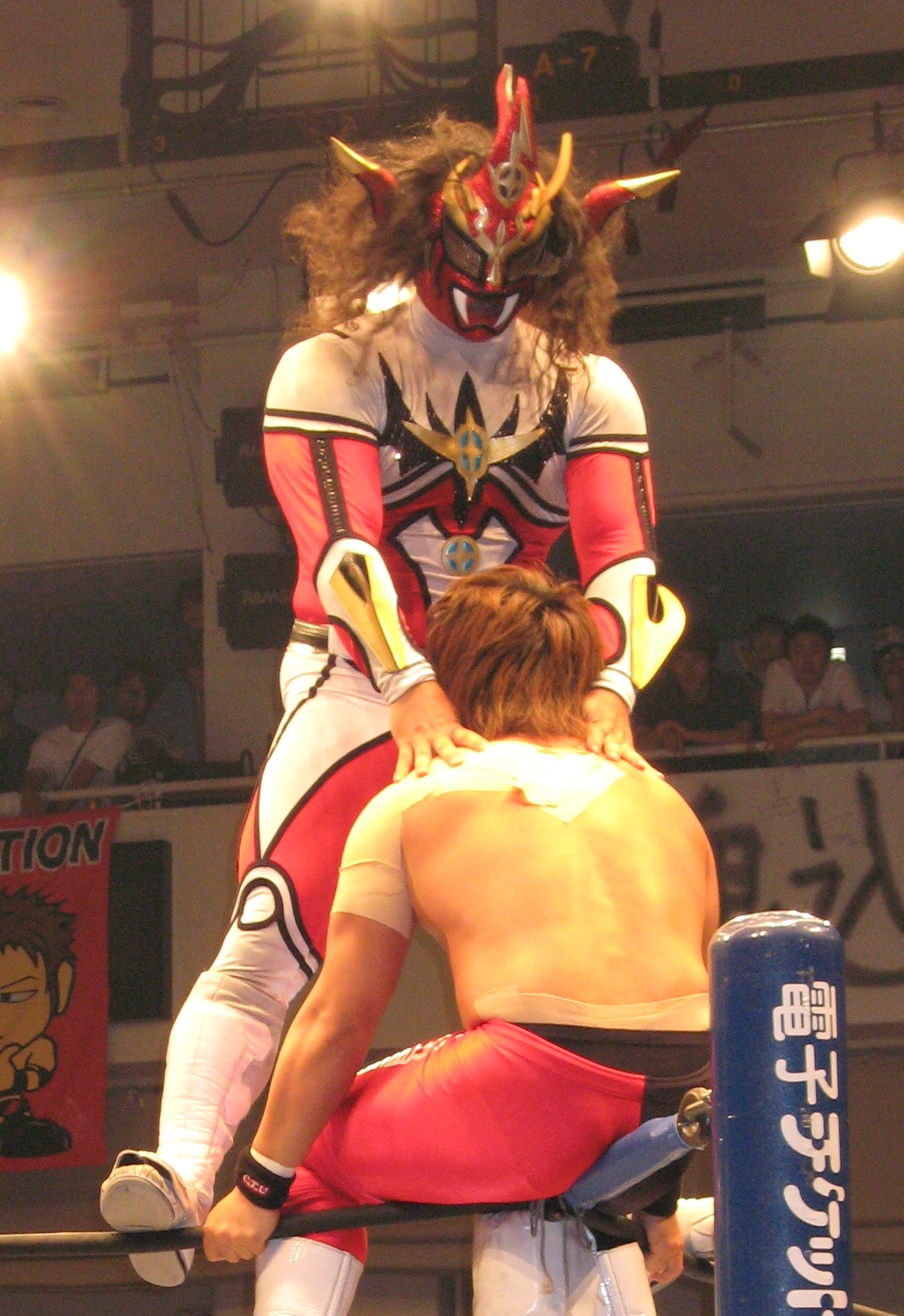
Liger in 2007

Yamada returned to NJPW on August 19, 1987, against Nobuhiko Takada in a losing effort. Yamada debuted his Shooting Star Press in a match against Masakatsu Funaki, for which he had gotten the idea from reading the manga Fist of the North Star. Throughout 1987 and 1988, Yamada improved with each match, occasionally getting shots at the IWGP Junior Heavyweight Championship, most notably against Owen Hart on June 10, 1988, and against Shiro Koshinaka on December 9, 1988. He would also take part in the first Top of the Super Juniors tournament where he earned 31 points, not enough to progress to the final. Within months of his second Canadian excursion, NJPW called him back, as they needed him for a gimmick based on an extremely popular anime superhero, Jushin Liger, created by manga artist Go Nagai. NJPW had done this previously with Tiger Mask, which had become a huge success. Yamada was given a superhero-like full body costume, resembling the superhero type featured in tokusatsu and anime programs.

Yamada as "Jushin Liger" returned to NJPW on April 24, 1989, at the Tokyo Dome. In the character's debut match, he defeated Kuniaki Kobayashi at Battle Satellite in Tokyo Dome. He has also wrestled all the Black Tigers to date (from Mark Rocco in 1989 to Tatsuhito Takaiwa in 2009). The Liger character underwent changes in conjunction with the Go Nagai anime progressing and its hero powering up. In January 1990, Liger was renamed "Jushin Thunder Liger", a name he continues to use to this day. Early in his career, Yamada's style mostly consisted of high flying. Years later, he started adapting more power moves and started focusing more on grappling and telling a story in the ring; part of this change was due to the fact that Liger had to reduce the stress he was putting on his body after undergoing brain tumor surgery in August 1996, which explained why he lost his match to Último Dragón in the first round of the J-Crown tournament.

==== IWGP Junior Heavyweight Champion (1989–2000) ====
Upon debuting the Liger character, Yamada quickly became one of NJPW's top junior heavyweights, soon capturing the IWGP Junior Heavyweight Championship from Hiroshi Hase on May 25, 1989, at Battle Satellite in Osaka. Liger successfully defended the title against Mark Rocco in his first title defense in the fifth round of a European Rounds match on July 12. He retained the title against Naoki Sano in his second title defense on July 13, which ended in a double knockout. This set up a rematch between the two on August 10, where Liger lost the title. At Super Power Battle in Osaka, Liger unsuccessfully challenged Sano for the title in a rematch.

In January 1990, Liger participated in a tournament to determine the #1 contender for the Junior Heavyweight Championship, which he won by defeating Owen Hart in the final on January 30. Liger received his title shot the following day against Naoki Sano, which Liger won to gain his second Junior Heavyweight Championship. Liger successfully defended the title against Pegasus Kid on March 19 before losing the title to Pegasus Kid in a rematch on August 19. At the Antonio Inoki 30th Anniversary Memorial Festival in Yokohama Arena event, Liger defeated Villano V to earn a Junior Heavyweight Championship shot against Pegasus Kid on November 1, which Liger won, thus winning his third Junior Heavyweight Championship in the process. During this time, Liger formed a faction called "Dragon Bombers" along with Tatsumi Fujinami, Shiro Koshinaka, Takayuki Iizuka and Black Cat and feuded with the Blond Outlaws group. Liger successfully defended the title against Negro Casas at King of Kings and Akira at Starrcade in Tokyo Dome before vacating the title in order for new champion to be crowned in the 1991 Top of the Super Juniors. He advanced to the semifinals by scoring eight points and defeated Negro Casas in the semifinals but lost to Norio Honaga in the final. Liger unsuccessfully challenged Honaga for the title at Tatsumi Fujinami's 20th Anniversary event, before defeating Honaga in a rematch to win his record-breaking fourth Junior Heavyweight Championship at Fighting Connection – Ultra-High And Mighty Declaration II. On July 4, Liger defeated Pegasus Kid in a mask versus mask match forcing the latter to unmask. Liger lost the title to Akira Nogami on August 9.

At Super Warriors in Tokyo Dome, Liger teamed with Masashi Aoyagi and Akira Nogami to defeat the team of Hiro Saito, Super Strong Machine and Norio Honaga in a six-man tag team match. On February 8, 1992, Liger defeated Norio Honaga in a title versus title match with Liger's WCW Light Heavyweight Championship and Honaga's IWGP Junior Heavyweight Championship on the line. Liger claimed his record-setting fifth IWGP Junior Heavyweight Championship in the process and successfully defended both titles against Pegasus Kid on February 10. Liger continued his IWGP Junior Heavyweight Championship reign with a successful title defense against Mad Bull Rex on March 9. He followed the success by winning the 1992 Top of the Super Juniors tournament in April, thus becoming the first competitor to win the tournament while holding the Junior Heavyweight Championship. Liger successfully defended the title against El Samurai at Over Heat Night before losing the title to Samurai on June 26. Liger failed to win the title in a rematch against Samurai on October 21.

At Fantastic Story in Tokyo Dome, Liger defeated Último Dragón to capture his record setting sixth Junior Heavyweight Championship. Liger successfully defended the title against Dean Malenko on March 21. He participated in the 1993 Top of the Super Juniors in June, in which he scored twelve points but failed to advance to the quarterfinals. Liger successfully defended the title against Wild Pegasus, Masao Orihara and Black Tiger throughout the remainder of the year. Liger formed a partnership with Wild Pegasus to participate in the 1993 Super Grade Tag League but scored only four points in the tournament.

Liger defeated Tiger Mask in a mask versus mask match at Battlefield on January 4, thus forcing Tiger Mask to unmask and reveal his identity as Koji Kanemoto. On the March 5 episode of World Pro Wrestling, Liger took on the IWGP Heayvweight Champion Shinya Hashimoto in a champion versus champion match, which he lost. On March 21, Liger made his fifth successful title defense of the Junior Heavyweight Championship against Black Tiger. He would conceptualize the Super J-Cup tournament specifically designed for junior heavyweights from all over the world and participated in the inaugural tournament on April 14, in which he defeated Hayabusa in the first round and Ricky Fuji in the quarterfinal but lost to The Great Sasuke in the semifinal. However, Liger rebounded with his participation in the 1994 Best of the Super Juniors, in which he scored twelve points to advance to the final where he defeated Super Delfin to win the tournament for the second time. Liger's sixth reign ended after he was forced to vacate the title due to fracturing his left ankle in a tag team match on September 24, where he teamed with Riki Choshu in a loss to Keiji Mutoh and Wild Pegasus in a losing effort. His title reign ended at 628 days, marking it the longest IWGP Junior Heavyweight Championship reign in history.

Liger returned to NJPW after recovering from his injury on August 11 after missing nearly a year. In his return match, Liger teamed with El Samurai in a loss to Koji Kanemoto and Shinjiro Otani. Later that year, Liger participated in the 1995 Super J-Cup on December 13, in which he defeated Gran Naniwa in the quarterfinals, Último Dragón in the semifinals and Gedo in the finals to win the tournament. Liger defeated Koji Kanemoto to capture his record setting seventh IWGP Junior Heavyweight Championship at Wrestling World on January 4, 1996. Liger successfully defended the title against Black Tiger on February 3. At Battle Formation in Tokyo Dome, Liger lost the title to The Great Sasuke. Later that year, Liger participated in the 1996 Best of the Super Juniors, in which he qualified for the semifinals and defeated El Samurai in the semifinal but lost to Black Tiger in the final.

At Sky Diving J, Liger defeated Dick Togo to capture the British Commonwealth Junior Heavyweight Championship. Liger would later conceptualize the J-Crown tournament in which eight junior heavyweight titles were unified to create a singular crown. He participated in the tournament on August 2, where he defended his British Commonwealth Junior Heavyweight Championship against Último Dragón, with the latter's WAR International Junior Heavyweight Championship simultaneously being defended. Liger went on to lose the match. On October 20, Liger competed in a match against The Great Muta. As the match progressed, Muta resorted to his underhand tactics that had become his style over the years. He tore at Liger's mask and eventually ripped it off, but Liger kept his face down on the mat. After grabbing a chair outside the ring, Muta entered the ring but before he could hit Liger with it, Liger stood up and revealed his face to be painted pale white with red writings and spit mist into Muta's face (another Muta trademark). He tore off his bodysuit and revealed a painted chest, then proceeded to fight more aggressively the rest of the match, despite losing the match to Muta. The character debuted in the match against Muta was dubbed "Kishin Liger" by NJPW. Liger would revive the character sporadically, relying on bloody and evil tactics in a match, using mannerisms and imagery that differ from the person's normal ways. This gimmick also used many wrestling moves that were regulars in Muta's move set, such as the Asian mist.

On November 3, Liger teamed with Muta in the One Night Tournament by defeating El Samurai and Tatsumi Fujinami in the opening round but lost to Akira Nogami and Michiyoshi Ohara in the semifinals. At Wrestling World on January 4, 1997, Liger defeated Último Dragón to win the J-Crown, thus winning all the championships of the J-Crown including his record-setting eighth IWGP Junior Heavyweight Championship. Liger successfully defended the J-Crown against Shinjiro Otani, Koji Kanemoto, Masayoshi Motegi and The Great Sasuke. In May, Liger participated in the 1997 Best of the Super Juniors but failed to advance from the round robin stage. On June 6, Liger lost the WAR International Junior Heavyweight Championship to Yuji Yasuraoka, thus leaving J-Crown with seven championships. Liger lost the J-Crown to El Samurai on July 6.

At Final Power Hall in Tokyo Dome, Liger lost to Riki Choshu. On February 7, 1998, Liger defeated Shinjiro Otani to win his record-setting ninth IWGP Junior Heavyweight Championship. He successfully defended the title against Kendo Kashin in his first title defense at Antonio Inoki's retirement event. He participated in the 1998 Best of the Super Juniors tournament but failed to advance to the semifinals. Liger successfully defended the title against Koji Kanemoto, The Great Sasuke, Kaz Hayashi, El Samurai, Tatsuhito Takaiwa and Dr. Wagner Jr. before losing the title to Kanemoto on March 17, 1999, ending a year-long reign.

At Strong Style Symphony - New Japan Spirit, Liger teamed with The Great Sasuke to defeat Dr. Wagner Jr. and Kendo Kashin to win the IWGP Junior Heavyweight Tag Team Championship. After failing to advance in the 1999 Best of the Super Juniors, Liger and Sasuke lost the tag team titles to Shinjiro Otani and Tatsuhito Takaiwa on July 13. At Jingu Climax, Liger and El Samurai unsuccessfully challenged Otani and Takaiwa for the titles. At Final Dome, Liger defeated Kendo Kashin to win his record-setting tenth Junior Heavyweight Championship. After exchanging the title with Juventud Guerrera in WCW, Liger returned to NJPW to retain the title against Koji Kanemoto and Minoru Tanaka before entering the 2000 Super J-Cup. Liger defeated Tiger Mask, Men's Teioh, Gran Hamada and Cima to win his second consecutive Super J-Cup. After successfully defending the Junior Heavyweight Championship against El Samurai, Liger lost the title to Tatsuhito Takaiwa on July 20, 2000.

Following the title loss, Liger began flirting with the heavyweight division after booker Riki Choshu decided to de-emphasize the junior heavyweight division (a costly decision that diminished its credibility), and Liger wrestled heavyweights without wearing the upper part of his bodysuit or his mask horns. In August, participated in his first G1 Climax tournament, in which he won only one match in his block against Tatsutoshi Goto on August 9. However, he lost the rest of his matches and was eliminated from his block. On September 12, Liger teamed with Shinya Makabe and unsuccessfully challenged Junior Stars (Koji Kanemoto and Minoru Tanaka) for the IWGP Junior Heavyweight Tag Team Championship. Liger would then engage in matches against Osaka Pro Wrestling talent, defeating Super Delfin at Do Judge!!. In November, Liger participated in the G1 Tag League by teaming with Super Strong Machine. They won only two matches, scoring a total of four points in the tournament and were thus eliminated. At The 2nd Judgement!!, the NJPW team of Liger, Minoru Tanaka and Shinya Makabe defeated Delfin, Takehiro Murahama and Tsubasa in a six-man tag team match. The following week, at Dream Win, Liger teamed with Tatsuhito Takaiwa against Kensuke Sasaki and Takashi Iizuka in a losing effort.

==== Junior Heavyweight Tag Team Champion (2001–2003) ====
At Wrestling World on January 4, 2001, Liger teamed with Manabu Nakanishi against Keiji Muto and Shinjiro Otani in a losing effort. At New Century Dash, Liger teamed with Junji Hirata to defeat Shiro Koshinaka and Tatsuhito Takaiwa. On March 6, Liger won his second IWGP Junior Heavyweight Tag Team Championship by teaming with El Samurai to defeat Junior Stars. After winning the title, Liger teamed with Yuji Nagata to participate in the two-night Naeba Cup Tag Team Tournament, which they won by defeating El Samurai and Shiro Koshinaka in the semifinals and Kensuke Sasaki and Minoru Tanaka in the final. At Wrestling Dontaku, Liger and Samurai successfully defended their tag team championship against the Mexican challengers Dr. Wagner Jr. and Silver King. After that, Liger participated in the Best of the Super Juniors. He qualified for the final by winning all of his matches in his block and defeated Minoru Tanaka in the final to win the tournament. At Dome-Quake, Liger and Samurai lost the Junior Heavyweight Tag Team Championship to Jado and Gedo.

==== Control Terrorism Unit and Legend (2004–2009) ====
From 2004 to 2007, Liger was the leader of the NJPW heel stable Control Terrorism Unit (CTU) along with Hirooki Goto, Minoru Tanaka, Black Tiger IV, Gedo, Jado, Prince Devitt and briefly James Gibson.

On July 30, 2006, Liger revived the Kishin Liger gimmick and faced off with rival Bad Boy Hido in NJPW. The story was that Hido had cut a piece of Liger's hair and Liger vowed revenge, so he transformed into Kishin Liger. Liger won the match with a brainbuster onto a steel chair. Liger's next appearance as Kishin Liger took place in June 2012 and was brought on by Taichi tearing his mask to pieces.

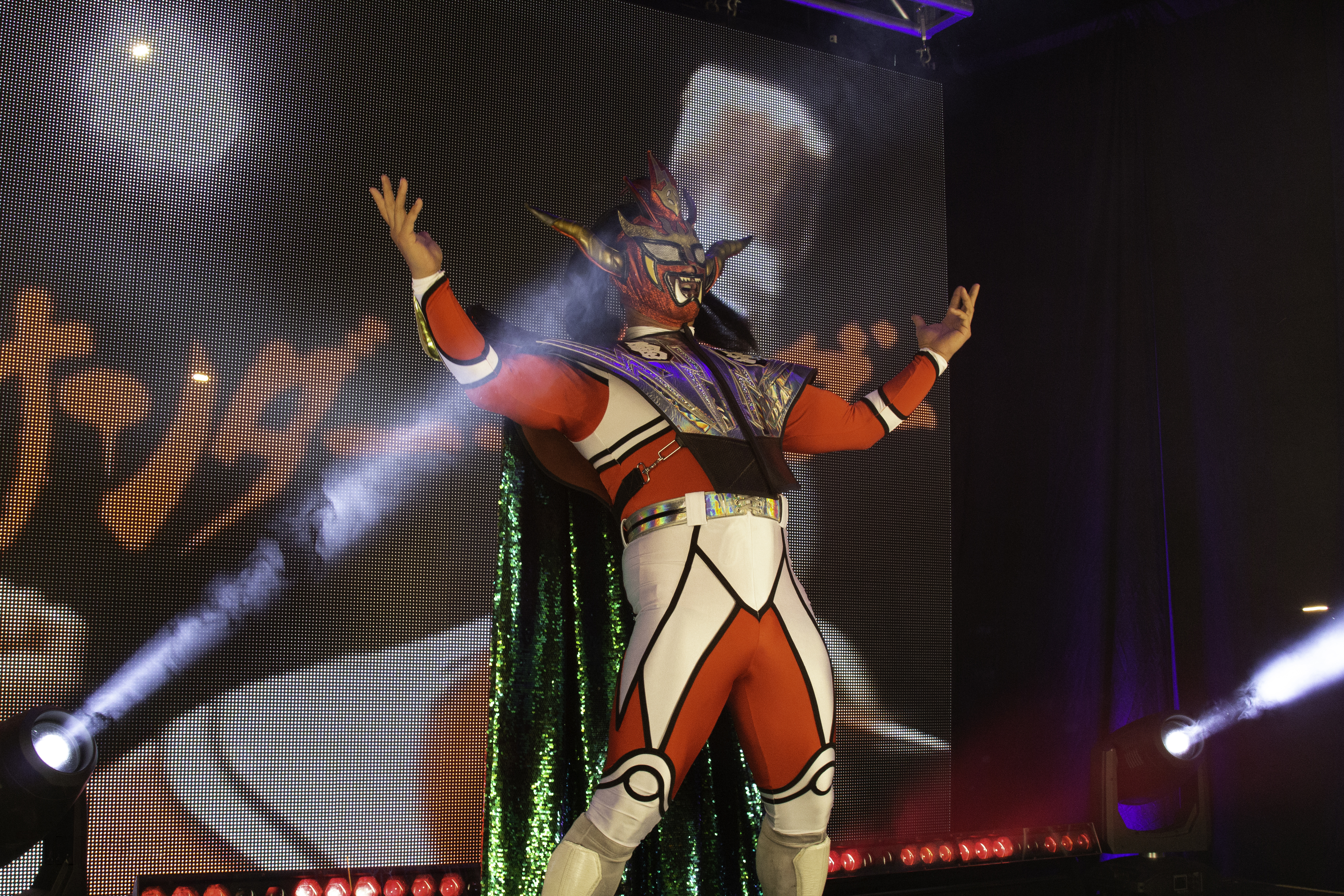
Liger in 2018

CTU was disbanded in August 2007, when Liger decided CTU would disband while at the top of NJPW, Liger would then join Masahiro Chono's Legend stable. The Legend stable would disband in February 2010, after Chono, Choshu and Akira's departures.

==== Junior heavyweight veteran and retirement (2010–2020) ====
Since then, Liger has mainly teamed with fellow veteran Tiger Mask, remaining outside of championship contention for the most part. Liger and Tiger won the vacant IWGP Junior Heavyweight Tag Team Championship on June 16, 2012, at Dominion 6.16, losing it to Forever Hooligans (Alex Koslov and Rocky Romero) on July 22. Liger's next shot at the IWGP Junior Heavyweight Championship took place on May 3, 2016, when he unsuccessfully challenged Kushida for the title at Wrestling Dontaku 2016. In May 2017, Liger announced that the 2017 Best of the Super Juniors would be his last BOSJ tournament. He finished the tournament with a record of six losses and one win, which came in his last match against Taichi.

At New Japan's 47th Anniversary Event, Liger was awarded a Junior Heavyweight Championship match against Taiji Ishimori after scoring a non-title victory over him the previous evening, however he failed to win the title losing via submission. The next day on March 7, 2019, it was announced that Liger will retire on January 5, 2020, at Wrestle Kingdom 14. Kishin Liger returned again on September 22, 2019, at Destruction in Kobe, when Minoru Suzuki removed Liger's mask. Kishin would spit mist into Suzuki's face and attempt to stab him with a spike, before giving chase to Suzuki while attacking officials, young lions, and Hiroshi Tanahashi in his pursuit. Liger retired on January 5, 2020, after he and Naoki Sano were defeated by Hiromu Takahashi and Ryu Lee.

==== Post-retirement (2020–present) ====
Following his retirement, Liger remains in NJPW, serving as a trainer in the promotion's dojo and as a Japanese-language commentator for events on New Japan Pro-Wrestling World.

=== World Wrestling Federation/WWE (1990, 2015, 2020–2021) ===
Liger first worked with World Wrestling Federation (WWF, now WWE) on April 13, 1990, defeating Akira Nogami at the Wrestling Summit, an event co-produced by NJPW, WWF, and All Japan Pro Wrestling (AJPW).

He returned to the company in 2015, defeating Tyler Breeze at the NXT TakeOver: Brooklyn event on August 22. According to NJPW, WWE had approached them about bringing Liger in for the event as a special guest for the show.

On March 16, 2020, it was announced that Liger would be inducted into that year's WWE Hall of Fame class. The 2020 Hall of Fame induction ceremony occurred in March 2021 due to COVID-19, with Liger sending in a video to accept the honor.

Liger was supposed to appear in the video game WWE 2K22, however was cut short from the game. This can be seen when using an SDB editor, where strings were left which reveals the plans to put Mysterio vs. Liger at WCW Starrcade '96

=== World Championship Wrestling (1991–1992, 1995–1999) ===
==== 1991–1992 ====
Liger made appearances with World Championship Wrestling (WCW) during the 1990s. He made his debut in December 1991. He feuded with Brian Pillman over the WCW World Light Heavyweight Championship. He defeated Pillman on December 25 for the title at a house show in Atlanta, Georgia. He would hold onto the title for over two months, before losing it back to Pillman at SuperBrawl II. Liger left WCW in December 1992 after Starrcade, teaming with Erik Watts in a losing effort to "Dr. Death" Steve Williams and Sting in a Lethal Lottery match.

==== 1995–1999 ====
Upon his return to WCW in 1995, Liger had the distinction of appearing in the first match on the inaugural WCW Monday Nitro, held at the Mall of America on September 4, losing to Brian Pillman. He returned to WCW in September 1995; he would go on to face many other opponents such as Chris Benoit, Dean Malenko, Rey Mysterio Jr., and Juventud Guerrera, as well as unsuccessfully challenging Konnan for the WCW United States Heavyweight Championship at Slamboree '96.

Liger was met with controversy around late-November/early-December 1999 while wrestling a short tour in WCW as the IWGP Junior Heavyweight Champion when he lost the championship on an episode of Monday Nitro to Juventud Guerrera via a blow to the head from a tequila bottle. Liger regained his title the following week from Psicosis, who was substituting for Guerrera because he broke his arm. However, the scripting of these title changes was viewed as embarrassing for NJPW and the company chose not to acknowledge or release any information about the title changes. In turn, none of the Japanese sports media outlets reported the two title changes as well. New Japan did not recognize Guerrera's reign until 2007. Liger was also referred to as a 10-time champion until this time.

=== Ring of Honor (2004–2010, 2014–2017) ===
On November 5, 2004, Liger debuted in Ring of Honor (ROH), headlining their back-to-back "Weekend of Thunder" shows. ROH selected Bryan Danielson as Liger's special opponent for that weekend. For Night 1, the two faced each other in a singles match, with Liger winning the highly competitive bout after a super brainbuster. On November 6, 2004, Night 2 would see a "dream tag-team" match in the main event. Liger chose then-ROH Champion Samoa Joe as his partner, and Danielson selected Low Ki for his side. Liger again came out on top, pinning Danielson with a Liger Bomb to win the match. On January 29, 2010, at ROH's debut show in Los Angeles, California as part of WrestleReunion 4, Liger lost a non-title match to ROH World Champion Austin Aries via pinfall after a brainbuster.

In May 2014, Liger returned to ROH as part of a tour co-produced by NJPW and ROH. On May 17 at War of the Worlds, Liger unsuccessfully challenged Adam Cole for the ROH World Championship. On March 27, 2015, Liger returned to ROH at the Supercard of Honor IX event, unsuccessfully challenging Jay Lethal for the ROH World Television Championship. Liger returned to ROH the following May to take part in the ROH/NJPW co-produced War of the Worlds '15 and Global Wars '15 events.

Liger returned to ROH on December 2, 2016, at Final Battle, where he was defeated by Silas Young. Liger returned to ROH on August 18, 2017, during their UK tour stop in London, which was co-promoted with NJPW, CMLL and the UK's Revolution Pro Wrestling (RPW). Liger teamed with Delirious and Místico to unsuccessfully challenge Dalton Castle and The Boys for the ROH World Six-Man Tag Team Championship.

=== Total Nonstop Action Wrestling (2005–2006) ===
Liger made his debut for the U.S.-based Total Nonstop Action Wrestling (TNA) promotion on October 23, 2005, as part of their Bound for Glory pay-per-view, losing to Samoa Joe. TNA advertised a match between Liger and Christopher Daniels for the 2006 Lockdown show, a show where all matches took place inside a steel cage. Liger was unaware of this when first accepting the booking, backing out of the show when he heard about the steel cage, something in which he had never participated before, fearing it would have hampered his performance. TNA made Liger the captain of the NJPW team for the TNA 2006 World X Cup Tournament. As such he defeated Team Canada's Captain Petey Williams at Sacrifice on May 14, 2006. Liger was eliminated in the X-Cup Gauntlet later that night and Team Japan was unable to gain any points in the match. This has led to Team Canada winning the tournament, with Team Mexico as runners up.

=== Consejo Mundial de Lucha Libre (2007–2011, 2013, 2019) ===
==== 2007–2010 ====
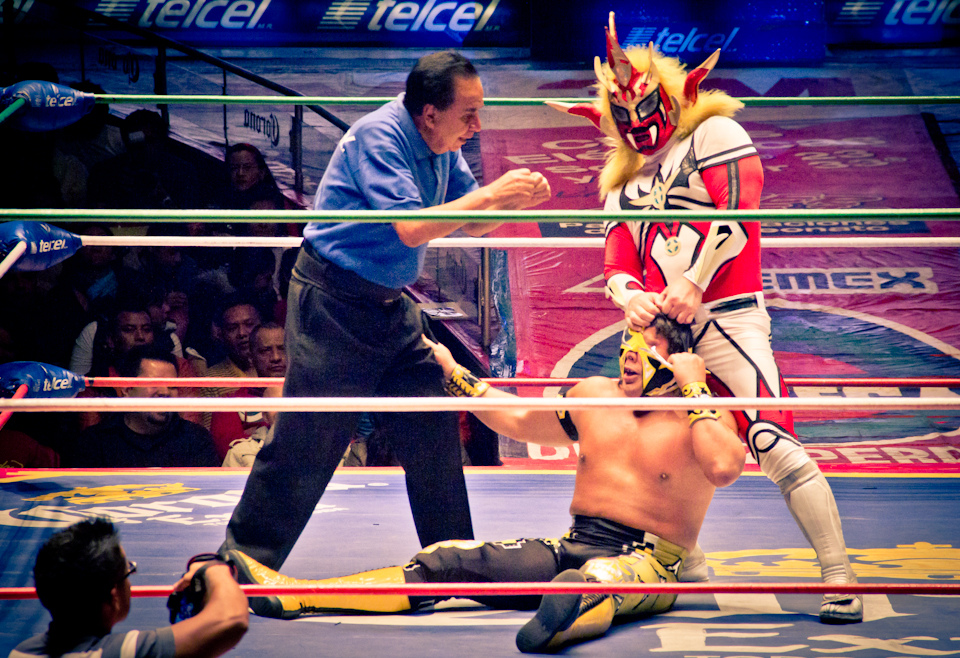
Liger tearing at Último Guerrero's mask during a CMLL match

In 2007 Liger made a short visit to Mexico, working for Consejo Mundial de Lucha Libre (CMLL), NJPW's Mexican associate. He took part in the 2007 CMLL International Gran Prix as the captain of a team of non-Mexican wrestlers. Liger was the last man eliminated from the match by winner Último Guerrero. Liger returned to CMLL in September 2009 for a longer tour, teaming with Okumura, Naito and Yujiro as La Ola Amarilla ("The Yellow Wave" in Spanish). At the CMLL 76th Anniversary Show La Ola Amarilla defeated Team Mexico (Último Guerrero, Atlantis, Black Warrior and Héctor Garza) in one of the featured matches on the show. The following week, at the 2009 Gran Alternativa show Liger unsuccessfully challenged for Último Guerrero's CMLL World Heavyweight Championship. He also failed to regain the IWGP Junior Heavyweight Championship from Místico before returning to Japan in October 2009. On May 3, 2010, at Wrestling Dontaku 2010, Liger defeated Negro Casas at a New Japan show in Fukuoka, Japan, to win the CMLL World Middleweight Championship.

==== 2010–2011 ====
Liger returned to CMLL in June 2010 for a long tour of the company. As the CMLL World Middleweight Championship he earned entry into the 2010 Universal Championship. On the August 6, 2010 Super Viernes show Liger won Block B by defeating Negro Casas, Héctor Garza and La Máscara to earn a spot in the finals. On the August 13, 2010 Super Viernes Liger defeated La Sombra to win the 2010 Universal Championship. On August 16, 2010, it was announced that Liger was one of 14 men putting their mask on the line in a Luchas de Apuestas steel cage match, the main event of the CMLL 77th Anniversary Show. Liger was the seventh man to leave the steel cage, keeping his mask safe. The match came down to La Sombra pinning Olímpico to unmask him. During the same tour, Liger also made his first successful defense of the CMLL World Middleweight Championship, defeating La Sombra on September 27. On January 4, 2011, at New Japan's Wrestle Kingdom V in Tokyo Dome event, Liger wrestled in a CMLL showcase match, where he and Héctor Garza were defeated by La Sombra and Máscara Dorada, when Sombra pinned Liger, setting up a CMLL World Middleweight Championship match for CMLL's Fantastica Mania 2011 show on January 22 in Tokyo, Japan. At Fantastica Mania Liger defeated La Sombra to retain the CMLL World Middleweight Championship. On May 3, Liger made his third successful defense of the title, defeating Máscara Dorada at New Japan's Wrestling Dontaku 2011 show. Liger returned to Mexico on September 15, 2011, announcing his intention of working as a technico for the first time during his run with CMLL. On September 30 at CMLL's 78th Anniversary Show, Liger defeated eleven other men in a torneo cibernetico to advance to the finals of the 2011 Leyenda de Plata. On October 7, Liger was defeated in the finals of the tournament by Volador Jr. On October 24, Liger made his fourth successful defense of the CMLL World Middleweight Championship, defeating El Texano Jr. On November 18, Liger lost the title to Dragón Rojo Jr., ending his reign at 564 days. Liger's three-month stint in CMLL ended on December 9, with a loss against Último Guerrero.

==== 2013 ====
On July 5, 2013, during a New Japan event, Liger teamed with Hiroshi Tanahashi to defeat Tama Tonga and El Terrible for the CMLL World Tag Team Championship. They lost the title to Tonga and Rey Bucanero on September 14.

==== 2019 ====
Liger returned to CMLL on July 19, 2019, to participate on the Jushin "Thunder" Liger Mexican Retirement Show. At the event, Liger defeated Carístico, Negro Casas, and Último Guerrero in a Relevo CMLL match.

=== North American independent promotions (2007–2019, 2025) ===
Liger made his Canadian return after 18 years on May 25 and 26, 2007, in Mississauga, Ontario and competed in UWA Hardcore Wrestling. On night one he teamed with Puma and defeated the team of Último Dragón and Kazuchika Okada, after Liger hit the Liger Bomb on Okada. On night two, Liger teamed with Último Dragón and defeated The Murder City Machine Guns (Alex Shelley and Chris Sabin) after a Liger Bomb / Dragon Sleeper combo.

Liger made his Pro Wrestling Guerrilla (PWG) debut in Los Angeles, California on January 30, 2010, as part of WrestleReunion 4. He defeated El Generico via pinfall after a brainbuster. On May 22, 2010, Liger made his debut for American promotion Jersey All Pro Wrestling (JAPW), losing to Homicide in the main event of the evening. He would return to the promotion seven months later on December 10, when he defeated Azrieal, Bandido Jr., B-Boy, El Generico and Kenny Omega in a six-way elimination match to win the JAPW Light Heavyweight Championship. The following day he would successfully defend the title against Mike Quackenbush. Liger would lose the title to Kenny Omega in his second defense on May 15, 2011, in Philadelphia, Pennsylvania, during the Invasion Tour 2011, New Japan's first tour of the United States.

Liger returned to the United States, making his debut for Extreme Rising on April 4, Pro Wrestling Syndicate (PWS) on April 5 and Chikara on April 6, 2013, all during the WrestleCon weekend in New Jersey. After the cancellation of the Extreme Rising event, Liger ended up taking part in another PWS event on April 4, during which he defeated Davey Richards and Tony Nese in a three-way match. The following day, Liger was defeated by former WWE wrestler John Morrison in what was billed as an "International Dream Match". Liger finished his American tour by teaming with Mike Quackenbush to defeat Jigsaw and The Shard in the main event of the Chikara show. Liger returned to California in 2016, taking part in the 2016 Battle of Los Angeles. He was eliminated from the tournament in the first round by Chris Hero.

In 2025 Liger came out of retirement to face Joey Janela at WrestleCade's SuperShow on November 29, 2025.

== Mixed martial arts career ==
On November 30, 2002, Liger was booked as a replacement for a mixed martial arts match in the Pancrase organization against Minoru Suzuki due to his planned opponent, Kensuke Sasaki, being forced to pull out due to injury. In what would be Liger's only MMA match, he was beaten by Suzuki via rear-naked choke at 1:48 into the first round. Liger wore a modified version of his mask during the bout, one that did not have the pronounced horns attached or his hair flowing free from the top.

== Personal life ==
Yamada resides in Fukuoka.

== Championships and accomplishments ==
- All Star Wrestling
  - World Heavy Middleweight Championship (2 times)
- Consejo Mundial de Lucha Libre
  - CMLL Universal Championship (2010)
  - CMLL World Middleweight Championship (1 time)
  - CMLL World Tag Team Championship (1 time) – with Hiroshi Tanahashi
- Dragon Gate
  - Open the Dream Gate Championship (1 time)
- Jersey All Pro Wrestling
  - JAPW Light Heavyweight Championship (1 time)
- Michinoku Pro Wrestling
  - British Commonwealth Junior Heavyweight Championship (2 times)
  - Super J-Cup (2000)
- National Wrestling Alliance
  - NWA World Junior Heavyweight Championship (2 times)
- New Japan Pro-Wrestling
  - IWGP Junior Heavyweight Championship (11 times)
  - IWGP Junior Heavyweight Tag Team Championship (6 times) – with The Great Sasuke (1), El Samurai (1), Minoru Tanaka (1), Koji Kanemoto (1), Akira (1) and Tiger Mask (1)
  - J-Crown (1 time)
  - NWA World Welterweight Championship (1 time)
  - UWA World Junior Light Heavyweight Championship (1 time)
  - WWA World Junior Light Heavyweight Championship (1 time)
  - WAR International Junior Heavyweight Championship (1 time)
  - WWF Light Heavyweight Championship (1 time)
  - Top/Best of the Super Juniors (1992, 1994, 2001)
  - G1 Climax Junior Heavyweight Tag League (2001) – with El Samurai
  - Naeba Prince Hotel Cup Tag Tournament (2001) – with Yuji Nagata
  - Young Lion Cup (1986)
  - Outstanding Performance Award (2000)
  - Tag Team Best Bout (2003) with Koji Kanemoto vs. Kotaro Suzuki and Naomichi Marufuji on June 10
  - IWGP Junior Heavyweight Title #1 Contendership Tournament (1990)
- Osaka Pro Wrestling
  - Osaka Pro Wrestling Tag Team Championship (1 time) – with Takehiro Murahama
- Pro Wrestling Illustrated
  - Ranked No. 8 of the top 500 singles wrestlers in the PWI 500 in 2000
  - Ranked No. 12 of the top 500 singles wrestlers of the "PWI Years" in 2003
  - Ranked No. 47 of the top 100 tag teams of the "PWI Years" with El Samurai in 2003
- Pro Wrestling Noah
  - GHC Junior Heavyweight Championship (1 time)
  - GHC Junior Heavyweight Tag Team Championship (1 time) – Tiger Mask
  - NTV G+ Cup Junior Heavyweight Tag League (2013) – Tiger Mask
- Revolution Pro Wrestling
  - British J-Cup (2017)
- Tokyo Sports
  - Newcomer Award (1985)
  - Outstanding Performance Award (1994)
- Vendetta Pro Wrestling
  - Vendetty Award: Special Guest Star of the Year (2015)
- World Championship Wrestling
  - WCW Light Heavyweight Championship (1 time)
- WWE
  - WWE Hall of Fame (Class of 2020)
- Wrestle Association R
  - WAR International Junior Heavyweight Tag Team Championship (1 time) – with El Samurai
  - Super J-Cup (1995)
- Wrestling Observer Newsletter
  - Best Gimmick (1989)
  - Best Flying Wrestler (1989–1993)
  - Best Technical Wrestler (1989–1992)
  - Best Wrestling Maneuver (1987, 1988) Shooting star press
  - Match of the Year (1990) vs. Naoki Sano on January 31 in Osaka, Japan
  - Most Outstanding Wrestler (1990–1992)
  - Rookie of the Year (1984) tied with Tom Zenk
  - Wrestling Observer Newsletter Hall of Fame (Class of 1999)

== Luchas de Apuestas record ==
Winner (wager)	Loser (wager)	Location	Event	Date	Notes
Jushin Thunder Liger (mask)	Pegasus Kid (mask)	Fukuoka, Japan	Summer Struggle 1991	July 4, 1991	
Jushin Thunder Liger (mask)	Tiger Mask (mask)	Tokyo, Japan	Battlefield	January 4, 1994	

== Mixed martial arts record ==
Professional record breakdown
1 match	0 wins	1 loss
By submission	0	1

Res.	Record	Opponent	Method	Event	Date	Round	Time	Location	Notes
Loss	0–1	Minoru Suzuki	Submission (rear-naked choke)	Pancrase: Spirit 8	November 30, 2002	1	1:48	Yokohama, Kanagawa	

== See also ==
- Jushin Liger (anime), the 1989 anime series that inspired Yamada's wrestling character
- Jushin Thunder Liger: Fist of Thunder, the 1995 OVT tokusatsu movie starring Yamada
