= El Samurai =

Japanese professional wrestler (born 1966)

Personal information
- Born: Osamu Matsuda; April 19, 1966 (age 60) Hanamaki, Iwate, Japan

Professional wrestling career
- Ring name(s): El Samurai; Osamu Matsuda; Edo Samurai
- Billed height: 1.80 m (5 ft 11 in)
- Billed weight: 92 kg (203 lb)
- Trained by: NJPW Dojo
- Debut: July 24, 1986
- Retired: 2013

Osamu Matsuda (松田 納, Matsuda Osamu) (born April 19, 1966) is a Japanese professional wrestler who is best known for his work in New Japan Pro-Wrestling (NJPW), and is better known by his stage name El Samurai.

== Professional wrestling career ==
=== Early years (1986–1992) ===
Osamu Matsuda graduated from high school in 1985, and joined the NJPW Dojo. He debuted on July 24, 1986 in a losing effort against Masaharu Funaki, and spent a few years working at the bottom of the card, wrestling with the likes of Kensuke Sasaki, Kenichi Oya, and Takayuki Iizuka. In March 1991 he went on a learning excursion to Mexico, and while working for the UWA promotion, adopted a mask and the El Samurai stage name.

=== New Japan Pro-Wrestling (1992–2008) ===
El Samurai returned to NJPW in March 1992. A month later, he made it to the finals of the Best of the Super Juniors tournament, in which he lost to Jushin Thunder Liger. Two months later, he defeated Liger for the IWGP Junior Heavyweight Championship. He would lose the title to Ultimo Dragon in November 1992. During that time, he would constantly team with Takayuki Iizuka and Akira Nogami in multi-man tag team matches, naming themselves the "Toukon Trio".

In April 1994, El Samurai took part in the 1994 Super J-Cup tournament; he defeated Masayoshi Motegi in the first round, before losing to The Great Sasuke in the quarterfinals. In December 1995, he entered into the second Super J-Cup tournament, but he didn't fare as well as the year before, as he lost to Dos Caras in the first round. In August 1996, he took part in a tournament to determine the first J-Crown champion. At the time, El Samurai was the WWF World Light Heavyweight Champion. He defeated Gran Hamada in the first round, before losing to eventual winner The Great Sasuke in the quarterfinals.

In 1997, El Samurai adopted a new attire and won the Best of the Super Junior tournament, defeating Koji Kanemoto in the final match, during which his mask was torn completely off his face. The match was later given five stars by Wrestling Observer's Dave Meltzer. One month later, he defeated Liger to win the J-Crown, which at that time consisted of seven unified junior heavyweight championships due to Liger losing one of the eight titles (the WAR International Junior Heavyweight Championship) before the title match with El Samurai. In March 2001, he and Liger won the IWGP Junior Heavyweight Tag Team Championship.

In April 2004 El Samurai unmasked willingly for the first time since adopting the character, going by his real name, Osamu Matsuda, for a match against Osamu Nishimura, but it was for one night only. Up until at the end of January 2005, he was unmasked again in a MUGA-style match against Shinsuke Nakamura. Samurai began to slow down in the mid-late 2000s, however, still managed to win the IWGP Junior Heavyweight tag team titles once again, this time with rookie Ryusuke Taguchi.

On February 1, 2008, NJPW agreed to let El Samurai leave the company after his contract expired, due to him suffering from many injuries that limited his appearances in late 2007 and early 2008.

=== Freelance (2008–2013) ===
On February 17, El Samurai appeared in All Japan Pro Wrestling, aiding Kaz Hayashi and Shuji Kondo by fending off NOSAWA Rongai and MAZADA. On May 8, 2010, El Samurai returned to New Japan to take part in the tournament contested for the vacant IWGP Junior Heavyweight Tag Team Championship. El Samurai and his partner, former rival Koji Kanemoto, advanced to the finals of the tournament, where they defeated the team of Prince Devitt and Ryusuke Taguchi to win the titles. On July 19, Kanemoto and El Samurai lost the Junior Heavyweight Tag Team Championship to Devitt and Taguchi.

== Championships and accomplishments ==
- Michinoku Pro Wrestling
  - British Commonwealth Junior Heavyweight Championship (1 time)
- New Japan Pro-Wrestling
  - IWGP Junior Heavyweight Championship (2 times)
  - IWGP Junior Heavyweight Tag Team Championship (3 times) – with Jushin Thunder Liger (1), Ryusuke Taguchi (1) and Koji Kanemoto (1)
  - J-Crown (1 time)
  - NWA World Welterweight Championship (1 time)
  - UWA World Junior Light Heavyweight Championship (2 times)
  - WWA World Junior Light Heavyweight Championship (2 times)
  - Best of the Super Juniors (1997)
  - DREAM* Win Junior Tag Team Tournament (2002) – with Gedo
  - G1 Climax Junior Heavyweight Tag League (2001) – Jushin Thunder Liger
  - One Night's Captain's Fall Tournament (1994) – with Great Sasuke, Gran Hamada and Shinjiro Ohtani
  - Super J Tag Tournament (2010) – with Koji Kanemoto
- Pro Wrestling Illustrated
  - Ranked No. 75 of the top 500 singles wrestlers in the PWI 500 in 1996
  - Ranked No. 210 of the top 500 singles wrestlers of the "PWI Years" in 2003
  - Ranked No. 47 of the top 100 tag teams of the "PWI Years" with Jushin Liger in 2003
- Social Pro Wrestling Federation
  - One Night Junior Heavyweight Tournament (1994)
- Universal Wrestling Association
  - UWA World Junior Heavyweight Championship (2 times)
  - UWA World Middleweight Championship (1 time)
  - WWF Light Heavyweight Championship (2 times)^{1}
- Wrestle Association "R"
  - WAR International Junior Heavyweight Tag Team Championship (1 time) – with Jushin Thunder Liger
- Wrestling Observer Newsletter
  - Most Improved Wrestler (1992)

^{1}No reign prior to December 1997 is officially recognized by WWE.
