= UWA World Junior Light Heavyweight Championship =

Professional wrestling championship

Details
- Promotion: Universal Wrestling Association; New Japan Pro-Wrestling; Toryumon; Michinoku Pro Wrestling; Mexican independent circuit
- Date established: November 20, 1977
- Current champion: Inactive
Statistics
- First champion: Cesar Valentino
- Most reigns: Gran Hamada (5 Times)
- Longest reign: Diluvio Negro II (7,191+ days)
- Shortest reign: Último Dragón (1 day)

The UWA World Junior Light Heavyweight Championship (Campeonato Mundia de Peso Semicompleto Junior UWA in Spanish) is a professional wrestling championship that was originally promoted by the Mexican lucha libre professional wrestling) promotion Universal Wrestling Association (UWA). the UWA operated from 1975 to 1995 but the title is still defended on the Mexican independent circuit after the UWA closed. The weight range for this championship is 97 kg (214 lb) to 107 kg (236 lb) but is not strictly enforced to these days. (Note: The most recent case of this is Mephisto holding the NWA World Welterweight Championship, a belt with a 78 kg (172 lb) upper limit, despite weighing 90 kg (200 lb).) The UWA World Junior Heavyweight Championship has also been promoted by New Japan Pro-Wrestling and was at one time one of the eight championships that made up the J-Crown Championship. Following the breakup of the J-Crown, the championship was used by the Toryumon promotion but has since then returned to Mexico where it's defended on the independent circuit.

Super Nova is the current holder of the UWA World Junior Light Heavyweight Championship, having defeated Operativo 209 for the title on May 17, 2013. As it was a professional wrestling championship, the championship was not won not by actual competition, but by a scripted ending to a match determined by the bookers and match makers. (Note: Hornbaker (2016) p. 550: "Professional wrestling is a sport in which match finishes are predetermined. Thus, win–loss records are not indicative of a wrestler's genuine success based on their legitimate abilities – but on now much, or how little they were pushed by promoters") On occasion the promotion declares a championship vacant, which means there is no champion at that point in time. This can either be due to a storyline, (Note: Duncan & Will (2000) p. 271, Chapter: Texas: NWA American Tag Team Title [World Class, Adkisson] "Championship held up and rematch ordered because of the interference of manager Gary Hart") or real life issues such as a champion suffering an injury being unable to defend the championship, (Note: Duncan & Will (2000) p. 20, Chapter: (United States: 19th Century & widely defended titles – NWA, WWF, AWA, IW, ECW, NWA) NWA/WCW TV Title "Rhodes stripped on 85/10/19 for not defending the belt after having his leg broken by Ric Flair and Ole & Arn Anderson") or leaving the company. (Note: Duncan & Will (2000) p. 201, Chapter: (Memphis, Nashville) Memphis: USWA Tag Team Title "Vacant on 93/01/18 when Spike leaves the USWA.")

== Title history ==
Key

Reign	The reign number for the specific set of wrestlers listed.
Event	The event promoted by the respective promotion in which the titles were won
N/A	The specific information is not known
—	Used for vacated reigns in order to not count it as an official reign
†	Indicates Championship reigns after the UWA closed down
§	Indicates that the title reign was part of the J-Crown Championship.
	Indicates that there was a period where the lineage is undocumented, could have been inactive

No.	Champion	Reign	Date	Days held	Location	Event	Notes	Ref.
1	Cesar Valentino	1	November 20, 1977	441	Mexico City, Mexico	Live event	Defeated Anibal America Salvaje to become the first champion.	(Note: Duncan & Will (2000) p. 397, Chapter: MEXICO: UWA World Junior Light Heavyweight Title [Flores, Mora])
2	Gran Hamada	1	February 4, 1979	66	Mexico City, Mexico	Live event		
3	Perro Aguayo	1	April 11, 1979	248	Mexico City, Mexico	Live event		
—	Vacated	—	December 15, 1979	—	N/A	N/A	Championship vacated when Perro Aguayo was unable to defend due to injury.	
5	El Solitario	1	January 27, 1980	428	Mexico City, Mexico	Live event	Defeated Masanobu Kurisu to win the vacant title.	
6	Eric Embry	1	March 30, 1981	119	Puebla, Puebla, Mexico	Live event		
7	El Solitario	2	July 19, 1981	691	Mexico City, Mexico	Live event		
8	El Signo	1	June 10, 1983	250	Tijuana, Baja California, Mexico	Live event		
—	Vacated	—	February 15, 1984	—	N/A	N/A	Championship vacated after El Signo makes an unauthorized title defense against Kato Kung Lee.	
9	Aníbal	1	May 27, 1984	111	Mexico City, Mexico	Live event	Defeated El Texano in a tournament final to win the vacant title.	
10	Invader III	1	September 15, 1984	Unknown	San Juan, Puerto Rico	Live event		
11	Aníbal	1	1984	Unknown	Unknown	Live event		
12	Negro Navarro	1	January 6, 1985	50	Mexico City, Mexico	Live event		
13	Mano Negra	1	February 25, 1985	286	Puebla, Puebla, Mexico	Live event		
14	El Cobarde II	1	December 8, 1985	86	Mexico City, Mexico	Live event		
15	Gran Hamada	2	March 4, 1986	257	Querétaro, Querétaro, Mexico	Live event		
16	Blue Panther	1	November 16, 1986	190	Mexico City, Mexico	Live event		
17	Solar I	1	May 25, 1987	259	Puebla, Puebla, Mexico	Live event		
18	Blue Panther	2	February 8, 1988	221	Puebla, Puebla, Mexico	Live event		
19	Gran Cochisse	1	September 16, 1988	225	Mexico City, Mexico	Live event		
20	Ringo Mendoza	1	April 29, 1989	423	Mexico City, Mexico	Live event		
21	Perro Aguayo	2	June 29, 1990	Unknown	Mexico City, Mexico	Live event		
—	Vacated	—	February 1992	—	N/A	N/A	Championship vacated when Perro Aguayo left the promotion.	
22	Gran Hamada	3	December 12, 1992	274	Mexico City, Mexico	Live event	Defeated Black Power II in a tournament final to win the vacant title.	
23	El Engendro	1	September 12, 1993	10	Naucalpan, México, Mexico	Live event		
24	Gran Hamada	4	September 22, 1993	792	Pachuca, Hidalgo, Mexico	Live event	After the UWA closed in 1995, Gran Hamada brings the title with him to Japan.	
25	Sabu †	1	November 23, 1995	8	Kawasaki, Japan	Live event		
26	El Samurai †	1	December 1, 1995	107	Niigata, Japan	Live event		
27	Koji Kanemoto †	1	March 17, 1996	Unknown	Amagasaki, Japan	Live event		
—	Vacated	—	May 1996	—	N/A	N/A	Championship vacated when Kanemoto is unable to defend it due to injury.	
28	Shinjiro Otani †	1	June 17, 1996	58	Tokyo, Japan	Sky Diving J	Defeated Kazushi Sakuraba to win the vacant title.	
29	Último Dragón §	1	August 4, 1996	1	Tokyo, Japan	Live event	Defeated Otani in the second round of the New Japan J-Crown Tournament.	
30	The Great Sasuke §	1	August 5, 1996	67	Tokyo, Japan	Live event	Defeated Dragón in the finals of the J-Crown Tournament to become the first J-Crown Champion.	
31	Último Dragón §	2	October 11, 1996	85	Tokyo, Japan	Live event		
32	Jushin Thunder Liger §	1	January 4, 1997	183	Tokyo, Japan	Wrestling World.		
33	El Samurai §	2	July 6, 1997	35	Sapporo, Japan	Live event		
34	Shinjiro Otani §	2	August 10, 1997	87	Nagoya, Japan	Live event		
—	Vacated	—	November 5, 1997	—	N/A	N/A	Championship vacated after the J-Crown championship is divided back into the original championships.	
35	Gran Hamada †	5	July 30, 1998	200	Ninohe, Japan	Live event	Defeated Convict I to win the vacant title.	
36	El Cobarde †	1	February 15, 1999	420	Nuevo Laredo, Tamaulipas, Mexico	Live event	Defeated Perro Aguayo to win the title.	
37	Heavy Metal †	1	April 10, 2000	Unknown	Nuevo Laredo, Tamaulipas, Mexico	Live event	The final champion with a verifiable connection to the original title lineage. No records can currently be found of Heavy Metal losing the title to a challenger. Further title reigns beyond this point cannot reliably be linked to the original championship at this time, and are based on a wrestler's personal claim to the title, or awarded by another company.	
38	Silver King †	1	2006	Unknown	Unknown	Live event		
39	Diluvio Negro II †	1	February 25, 2007	Unknown	Monterrey, Nuevo León, Mexico	Live event		
41	Histeria †	1	Unknown	Unknown	Unknown	Live event		
42	El Pulpo †	1	June 16, 2011	Unknown	Matamoros, Tamaulipas, Mexico	Live event		
44	Operativo 209 †	1	March 31, 2013	47	Stockton, California, United States	Live event	Won an eight-man title tournament hosted by Mexican promotion WWO to crown a new champion.	
45	Super Nova †	1	May 17, 2013	594	Yakima, Washington, United States	Live event		
46	Defunct		2015		Unknown	Unknown	No verifiable title defenses or appearances have been made since late 2014, when champion Super Nova joined the AAA Mexican wrestling promotion. Length of title reign is marked to have ended on 1/1/15.	
