= J-Crown =

Unified professional wrestling championship

Details
- Promotion: New Japan Pro-Wrestling
- Date established: August 5, 1996
- Date retired: November 5, 1997
Statistics
- First champion: The Great Sasuke
- Final champion: Shinjiro Otani
- Longest reign: Jushin Thunder Liger (183 days)
- Shortest reign: El Samurai (35 days)
- Oldest champion: Jushin Thunder Liger (32 years, 218 days)
- Youngest champion: Shinjiro Otani (25 years, 76 days)
- Heaviest champion: Shinjiro Otani (236 lb (107 kg))
- Lightest champion: The Great Sasuke (180 lb (82 kg))

The J-Crown, also known as the J-Crown Octuple Unified Championship (Japanese: ジュニア8冠王座, Hepburn: Junia 8 kan'ōza; English: Junior 8-Crown Champion), was a unified, multi-promotional professional wrestling championship initially created by New Japan Pro-Wrestling (NJPW). It was formed via the unification of eight (later seven) junior heavyweight and other lower-weight class titles from several different organizations. The J-Crown Tournament that crowned the inaugural champion was held in August 1996.

== History ==
The J-Crown was the unification of eight different championship belts from multiple different countries, including ones from Japan, Mexico, the United Kingdom, and the United States. The tournament to crown the first champion was held over four nights, from August 2 to August 5, 1996, the same dates that New Japan Pro-Wrestling's annual G1 Climax event took place, promoting two major tournaments on one tour. Jushin Thunder Liger is credited with coming up with the idea for the J-Crown. The inaugural champion was The Great Sasuke. The J-Crown was defended for just over a year.

While Último Dragón was champion, the titles appeared on World Championship Wrestling programming, as Dragón also held the WCW Cruiserweight Championship. Dragón additionally held the NWA World Middleweight Championship concurrently with the J-Crown. When Liger was champion, he lost the WAR International Junior Heavyweight Championship to Yuji Yasuraoka on June 6, 1997, in Tokyo, Japan. Liger, however, continued to defend the J-Crown with seven titles instead of eight.

As part of their introduction of a new WWF Light Heavyweight Championship, the World Wrestling Federation (WWF) demanded that the then-current champion Shinjiro Otani return the belt. Otani returned the championship to the WWF and subsequently dissolved the J-Crown on November 5, 1997, by vacating all of the remaining component titles except for the IWGP Junior Heavyweight Championship, with the other belts being restored to their home promotions.

== Championships ==
Title	Promotion	Champion
IWGP Junior Heavyweight Championship	New Japan Pro-Wrestling	The Great Sasuke
MPW British Commonwealth Junior Heavyweight Championship	Michinoku Pro Wrestling	Jushin Thunder Liger
NWA World Junior Heavyweight Championship	National Wrestling Alliance - Wrestle Yume Factory	Masayoshi Motegi
NWA World Welterweight Championship	Consejo Mundial de Lucha Libre	Negro Casas
UWA World Junior Light Heavyweight Championship	Universal Wrestling Association - New Japan Pro-Wrestling	Shinjiro Otani
WAR International Junior Heavyweight Championship	Wrestle Association R	Último Dragón
WWA World Junior Light Heavyweight Championship	World Wrestling Association - Federación Universal de Lucha Libre	Gran Hamada
WWF Light Heavyweight Championship	Universal Wrestling Association - Michinoku Pro Wrestling	El Samurai

== Later incorporated ==
Title	Promotion	Champion
NWA World Middleweight Championship	Consejo Mundial de Lucha Libre	Corazón de León
WCW World Cruiserweight Championship	World Championship Wrestling	Dean Malenko

== Inaugural championship tournament (1996) ==
Every match was a title match, the final was for all 8 championships.

Quarterfinals
Masayoshi Motegi	Pin
The Great Sasuke	11:50
Gran Hamada	Pin
El Samurai	12:38
Jushin Thunder Liger	Pin
Último Dragón	2:38
Negro Casas	Pin
Shinjiro Otani	11:34

Semifinals
The Great Sasuke	Pin
El Samurai	16:25
Último Dragón	Pin
Shinjiro Otani	16:04

Finals
The Great Sasuke	Pin
Último Dragón	13:56

== Title history ==
Key
No.	Overall reign number
Reign	Reign number for the specific champion
Days	Number of days held

No.	Champion	Championship change			Reign statistics		Notes	Ref.
No.	Champion	Date	Event	Location	Reign	Days	Notes	Ref.
New Japan Pro Wrestling (NJPW)
1	The Great Sasuke	August 5, 1996	G1 Climax 1996 Final	Tokyo, Japan	1	67	Defeated Último Dragón in a tournament final to become the first champion. This event was promoted by New Japan Pro-Wrestling.	
2	Último Dragón	October 11, 1996	Osaka Crush Night	Osaka, Japan	1	85	This event was promoted by Wrestle Association R. During his reign, Último Dragón had already captured the NWA World Middleweight Championship from Corazón de León and then captured the WCW Cruiserweight Championship from Dean Malenko in WCW Starrcade, making him the most decorated wrestler in history at the time as he was the active reigning and defending champion of 10 titles. This record would be broken on October 18, 2025, at AEW WrestleDream by Mercedes Moné after she won a total of 11 championships.	
3	Jushin Thunder Liger	January 4, 1997	Wrestling World 1997	Tokyo, Japan	1	183	This event was promoted by New Japan Pro-Wrestling. Lost the WAR International Junior Heavyweight Championship to Yuji Yasuraoka on June 6, 1997, in Tokyo, Japan; from that point on, the J-Crown is represented by seven championship belts.	
4	El Samurai	July 6, 1997	House show	Sapporo, Japan	1	35	This event was promoted by New Japan Pro-Wrestling.	
5	Shinjiro Otani	August 10, 1997	House show	Nagoya, Japan	1	87	This event was promoted by New Japan Pro-Wrestling.	
—	Deactivated	November 5, 1997	—	—	—	—	The World Wrestling Federation (WWF) demanded that Shinjiro Otani vacate and return the WWF Light Heavyweight Championship to them immediately. On the same day Otani also vacated the remaining belts except for the IWGP Junior Heavyweight Championship, with the belts returning to their home promotions.	
