= The Great Sasuke =

Japanese professional wrestler

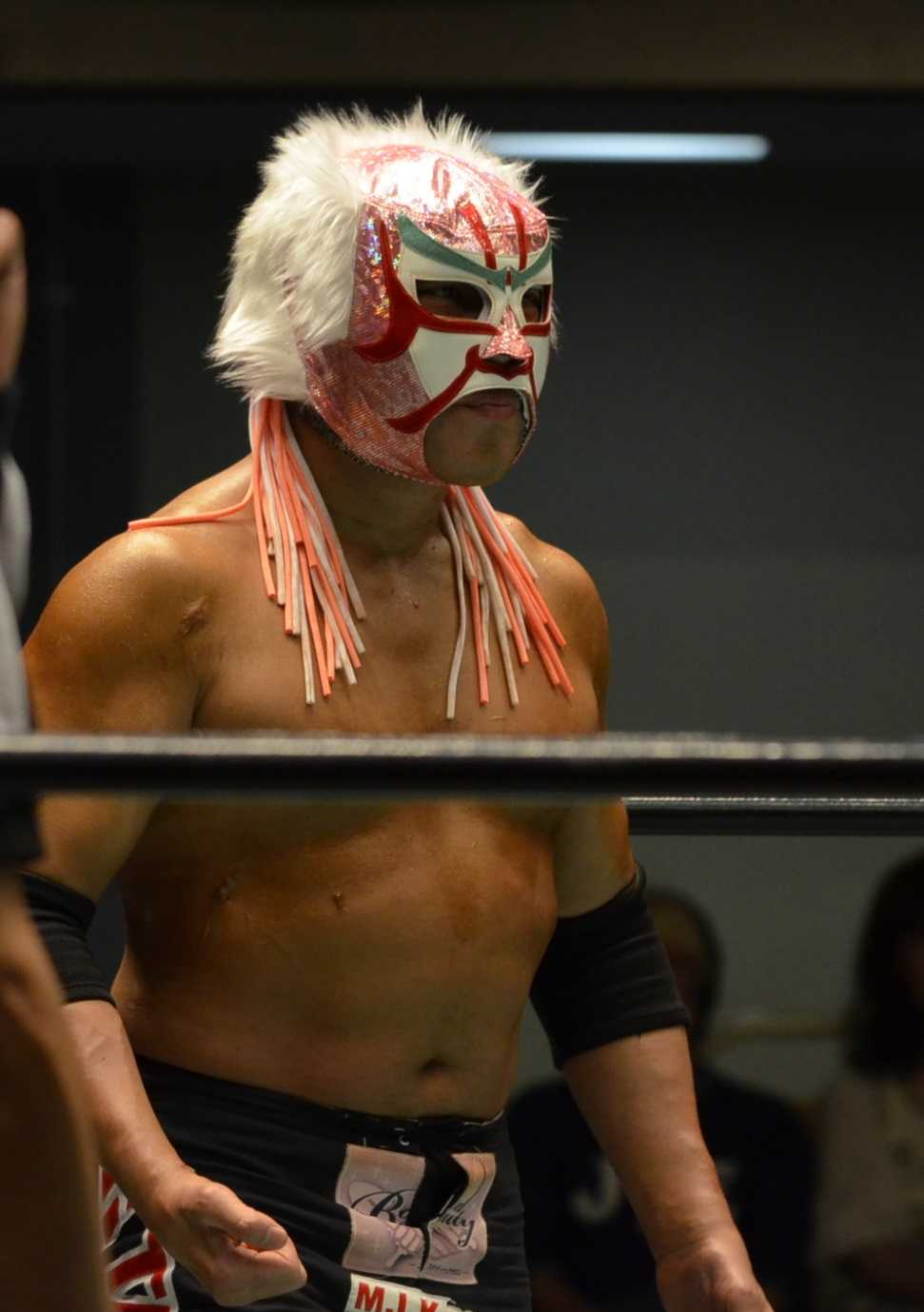
- The Great Sasuke in 2014

Personal information
- Born: Masanori Murakawa; July 18, 1969 (age 57) Morioka, Iwate, Japan

Professional wrestling career
- Ring name(s): The Great Sasuke; Masa Michinoku; Ninja Sasuke; Sasuke; Black Ninja; Sasuke The Ram
- Billed height: 1.73 m (5 ft 8 in)
- Billed weight: 82 kg (181 lb)
- Trained by: Kotetsu Yamamoto; Gran Hamada
- Debut: March 1, 1990

Masanori Murakawa (村川 政徳, Murakawa Masanori; born July 18, 1969), best known under his ring name The Great Sasuke (ザ・グレート・サスケ, Za Gurēto Sasuke), is a Japanese professional wrestler, professional wrestling promoter and politician. He is the founder of Michinoku Pro Wrestling (MPW). He currently wrestles in Japan and in the United States in various independent circuits. Aside from professional wrestling, he is also a former Iwate Prefectural Assembly legislator. He is said to have an incredible tolerance for pain, mainly in reference to the injuries he has had including a cracked skull on two occasions.

== Professional wrestling career ==
=== Universal Lucha Libre (1990–1993) ===
After failing the entrance exams to New Japan Pro-Wrestling (NJPW), Murakawa joined Universal Lucha Libre and had his debut on March 1, 1990, against Monkey Magic Wakita. He later adopted the name "Masa Michinoku", derived from his own given name and the alternate name for his Japanese home region of Tōhoku, Michinoku. He portrayed a Japanese folkloric gimmick who wore a cloak and a sandogasa hat in his ring entrance, which he traded for a white ōendan gakuran every time he wrestled abroad. His underling Taka Michinoku would receive a similar character.

During a tour in Mexico for Universal Wrestling Association, Murakawa adopted the character of Ninja Sasuke, a ninja gimmick inspired by the legendary Sarutobi Sasuke. He started wearing a black bodysuit with a matching lucha libre mask, and utilized a wrestling style set between lucha libre and martial arts. Upon returning to Japan after a second Mexico tour, he finally tweaked his name to "The Great Sasuke", and adopted a red, black, and white mask patterned after kumadori makeup, reminiscent of the one worn by fellow Japanese wrestler Mach Hayato.

Shortly after, Sasuke proclaimed he was going to found a professional wrestling promotion in Tohoku, initially thought as a Universal Lucha Libre branch, and left the promotion with a large group of wrestlers. He would found Michinoku Pro Wrestling, the first Japanese independent promotion not to be based around the Tokyo area.

=== Michinoku Pro Wrestling (1993–present) ===
==== Junior competition (1993–1996) ====
MPW kicked off in March 1993, when Sasuke and the rest of babyface wrestlers entered an intense feud against the villainous Super Delfin and his Delfín Corps. This rivalry would last many years.

In 1994, New Japan Pro-Wrestling celebrated the first Super J Cup, a junior heavyweight tournament for wrestlers from all over the world. Sasuke was drafted and reached the finals after beating NJPW favourites Jushin Thunder Liger and El Samurai, but fell to Wild Pegasus at the end. Despite his loss, Sasuke represented Michinoku Pro excellently and allowed for it to receive national coverage, and he himself became one of the most popular junior wrestlers in Japan.

The same year, Sasuke competed in the similar NJPW Super Grade Jr. Heavyweight Tag League, where he teamed up with Black Tiger. As with the previous, Sasuke and Tiger amassed a high number of wins and came to the finals, but were eliminated there by Wild Pegasus and Shinjiro Otani. Sasuke also participated in the first Fukumen World League, hosted by Michinoku Pro Wrestling in 1995 and admitting only masked wrestlers. Sasuke was defeated in the final round by Dos Caras.

In April 1996, Sasuke returned to NJPW and defeated Liger for the IWGP Junior Heavyweight Championship, which he defended five times at both NJPW and MPW. His reign, along with his next title win over NWA World Junior Heavyweight Champion Masayoshi Motegi and WWF Light Heavyweight and WWA World Junior Light Heavyweight double champion El Samurai, would lead to the creation of the J Crown title, with Sasuke winning it in the final of a tournament against Último Dragón on August. For two months, Sasuke was one of the most decorated wrestlers in history, until he lost all of it to Dragón in Wrestle Association R in October 1996.

==== North America ====
In February 1997, Sasuke and several of his MPW teammates made a pair of appearances for Extreme Championship Wrestling in United States. In July, he and Taka Michinoku also wrestled two matches for the World Wrestling Federation, one of them at In Your House 16: Canadian Stampede. It was apparent that Sasuke would sign up with WWF, but it was Michinoku who ended up being signed on his place for unknown reasons.

==== Varied storylines ====
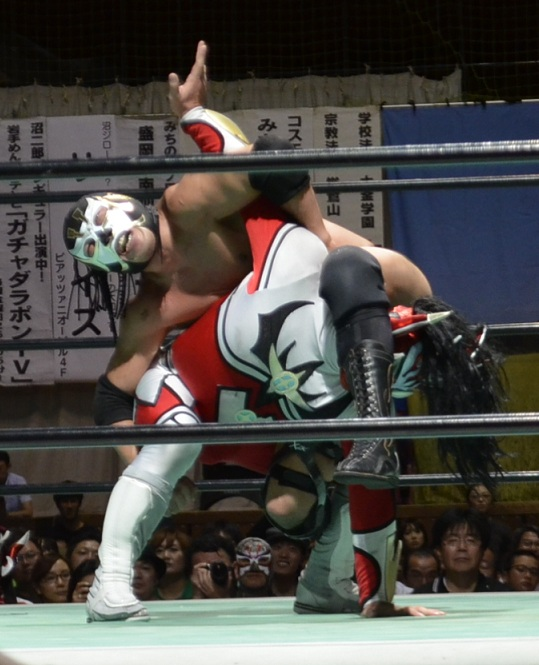
Sasuke holding Jushin Thunder Liger in an octopus hold.

Upon returning to Japan, Sasuke and Tiger Mask IV began feuding with two heel doppelgängers, Sasuke the Great and Masked Tiger (played respectively by Masao Orihara and Takeshi Ono), aside from usual villain Super Delfin. Around this time, however, Sasuke would take repeated hiatuses in order to have time to heal injuries, which led him to clash against other wrestlers, most particularly Delfin, who accused him of being unfit to lead the promotion. This dissension would end up switching their respective alignment, with Delfín joining the home army and turning into the promotion's ace while Sasuke turned heel and became an egotistical overlord. He would even change his mask, replacing its red stripes for blue stripes, as well as his name, leaving it as just "Sasuke" written in all caps. Sasuke would create his personal villainous stable, Sasuke Group, by allying with resident heels and summoning Crazy Max (Shiima Nobunaga's punk faction) from Toryumon.

The battle between the Sasuke Group and the rest of Michinoku wrestlers would have the effect of fracturing the promotion, as Dick Togo and Super Delfin had their own feud about the latter's role in the babyface team. After Togo humiliated Delfín by forcing him to crawl between his legs and later caused a riot by abusing him further, Sasuke adopted the same approach against Delfín in their battles, which eventually led to his departure from MPW to form Osaka Pro Wrestling due to both kayfabe and real dissatisfaction with the angle. Sasuke continued his war on MPW until 1999, when he was forcefully turned face again after Jinsei Shinzaki "exorcized the evil out of him." Now devoid of talent due to the absence of wrestlers who had left with Delfín and other ventures, MPW was left in ruins, a situation the now heroic Sasuke vowed to mend.

In 1999 he won the NWA World Middleweight Championship vacated by old rival Ultimo Dragon. Although the tournament was promoted by Ultimo's Toryumon Japan promotion, Sasuke took the title to his base at Michinoku and styled himself a "traveling world champion" in the style of NWA World Heavyweight Champions from the 1960-80s.

In 2001, Sasuke had a feud in Michinoku Pro against a returning Dick Togo and his sable, Far East Connection.

Sasuke left the running of the promotion to Shinzaki in 2003 to focus on his political career, handing the president job to him. He lost the NWA title to Último Dragón, who then vacated it in preparation for his WWE career. The same year, Sasuke reconciled with Super Delfin for a special match on November 2 by mediation of Shinzaki.

==== Toryumon X era ====
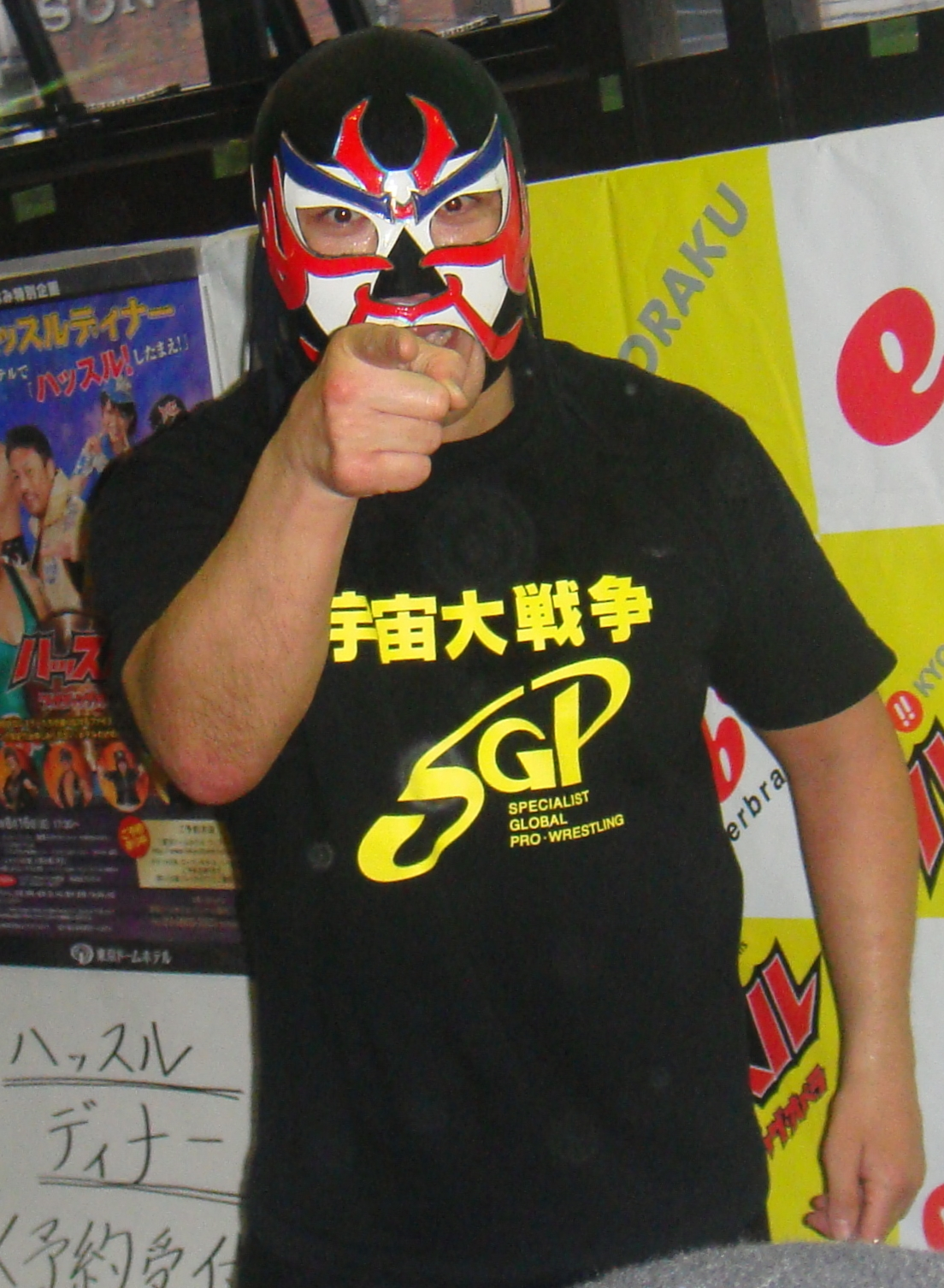
Sasuke wearing his signature mask at the Hustle event in 2009.

In 2004, Sasuke became a regular wrestler for Hustle, where he played a lieutenant role to "Hustle Captain" Naoya Ogawa. At the same time, with MPW now repopulated by most of the fallen Toryumon X wrestlers, Sasuke commanded the Michinoku home army against the new top heel faction, Los Salseros Japoneses (Takeshi Minamino, Pineapple Hanai and Mango Fukuda). He formed tag teams with Dick Togo and Garuda, but also joined Kei and Shu Sato to try to reform Sailor Boys, the boy band stable they formed in Toryumon with Taiji Ishimori. However, this was short-lived, as the Sato brothers turned heel the same year and joined Kagetora to create Stoned, the next great heel stable.

Sasuke spent 2006 in an interpromotional feud with Osaka Pro Wrestling, eventually having a degree of reconciliation with Super Delfin in the ring, and continued wrestling in Hustle and other promotions, allying with tarento Hitomi Kaikawa in her wrestling debut. The same year, after a series of challenges, Sasuke initiated the tradition of the Great Space War (宇宙大戦争, Uchuu Daisensou), a garbage wrestling event where he would face off against the Sato brothers under outrageous costumed identities and fantastic storylines. After sitting out of most of 2007 due to his political career, he returned to form a tag team with upcoming ace Yoshitsune. Stoned disappeared later in the year, leaving place for the rise of Kowloon, a traitorous faction apparently led by Hayato Fujita. Yoshitsune departed at the end of 2008, leaving Sasuke and Shinzaki to delegate the Michinoku Seikigun on Kenou. In 2010, Sasuke's old enemy Ultimo Dragón appeared to reveal himself as the master behind Kowloon.

In August 2009, months after unsuccessfully challenging Fujita for the Tohoku Junior Heavyweight Championship, Sasuke adopted a gimmick based on Randy "The Ram" Robinson, Mickey Rourke's character from the professional wrestling film The Wrestler. He started wrestling barechested for the first time in his career, donned green tights with, and adopted a taunting diving headbutt just like the film character. He abandoned the impersonation after a couple years, though he retained the custom to wear only shorter tights as opposed to his old bodysuit.

On April 15, 2011, Sasuke returned to the United States to wrestle for Chikara in the 2011 King of Trios tournament, where he would represent Michinoku Pro with Dick Togo and Jinsei Shinzaki. In their first round match Team Michinoku Pro defeated Team Minnesota (1-2-3 Kid, Arik Cannon and Darin Corbin). The following day, Team Michinoku Pro defeated Jigsaw, Manami Toyota and Mike Quackenbush to advance to the semifinals of the tournament. On April 17, Team Michinoku Pro was eliminated from the tournament in the semifinal stage by F.I.S.T. (Chuck Taylor, Icarus and Johnny Gargano).

==== Mu no Taiyo ====
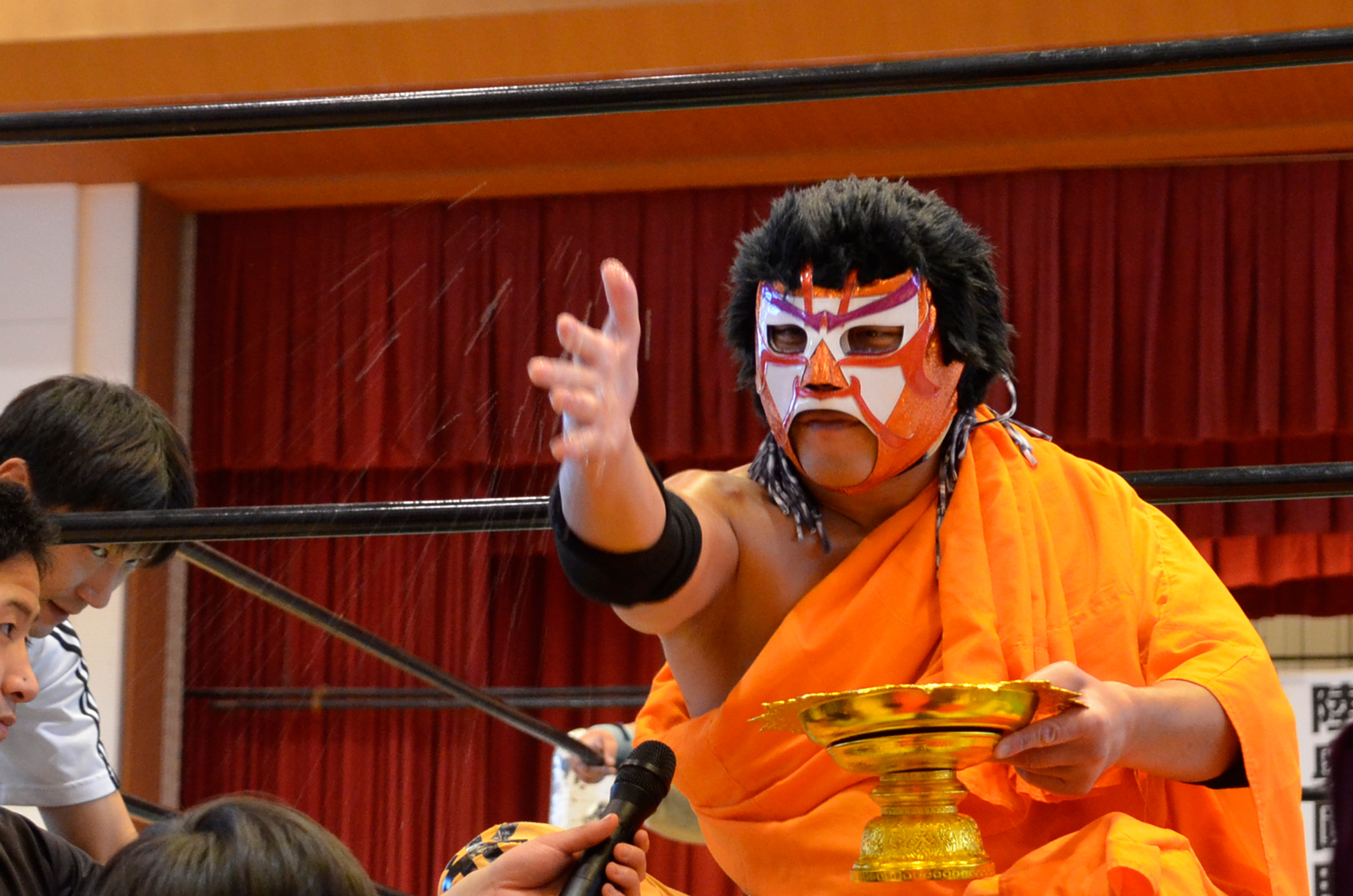
Sasuke as part of Mu no Taiyo in 2018.

At the end of 2013, Sasuke took part in the classic "Great Space War" match, where he performed a striptease with Macho Pump parodying the film Magic Mike. However, for the first time in the history of GSW, Kei and Shu Sato (now known as the Brahman Brothers) defeated Sasuke after the latter crashed in a dangerous stunt, which prompted him to reflect about the state of things. Sasuke then said he knew the Brahmans were attempting to protect the Earth from alien invaders, and asked them to join forces to fight for the greater good. This led to the creation of Mu no Taiyo (ムーの太陽, Mū no Taiyō), a shinshūkyō cult-themed stable, with Sasuke posing as their messianic leader under a new mask modified to resemble the Brahmans. It marked the first time Sasuke had turned heel in many years.

Mu no Taiyo opposed the Michinoku home army, but had a particular beef with popular tag team of Yapper Man 1 and Yapper Man 2, as well as New Phase, the new team of Ayumu Gunji and Daichi Sasaki.

In early 2021, the Brahman Brothers kicked Sasuke out of Mu no Taiyo following a loss to the Yapper Men and GAINA. Two months later, Sasuke would reunite with Shinozaki and the two would beat Mu no Taiyo for the MPW Tohoku Tag Team Championships and the UWA World Tag Team Championships.

== Other media ==
In 1999, Sasuke performed on Sasuke, the popular Japanese obstacle course competition. In the Third Competition, he got stuck at the Rolling Log and timed out on the Hill Climb. When the name SASUKE was translated into "Ninja Warrior" for the United States, the translators ignored his wrestling background and called him "The Great Ninja Warrior".

Sasuke is also part of the rock band Crazy Crew with Ricky Fuji and Ken45°.

== Personal life ==
On February 19, 2009, Sasuke was arrested for assault after kicking a 36-year-old man and grabbing him by the shirt collar. Sasuke was reported to be angry because his picture was being taken with a cellphone camera. The incident happened on a Jōban Line train at Minami-Senju Station. However, all charges were dropped and was released from jail on February 21, after serving 40 hours in jail, after Sasuke apologized to the man. The man who took Sasuke's photograph was said to not have known who he was and thought he was just a "crazy" person wearing a mask in public.

== Political career ==
On April 13, 2003, Sasuke won election to the Iwate Prefectural Assembly as an independent supported by the Liberal Party, making him the first actual masked legislator in history. He became the fourth Japanese wrestler to get elected to office. Antonio Inoki, Hiroshi Hase and Atsushi Onita preceded him, though all of them were elected to the Diet of Japan at the national level.

Sasuke unsuccessfully ran in his bid to become governor of Iwate in the 2007 election.

== Championships and accomplishments ==
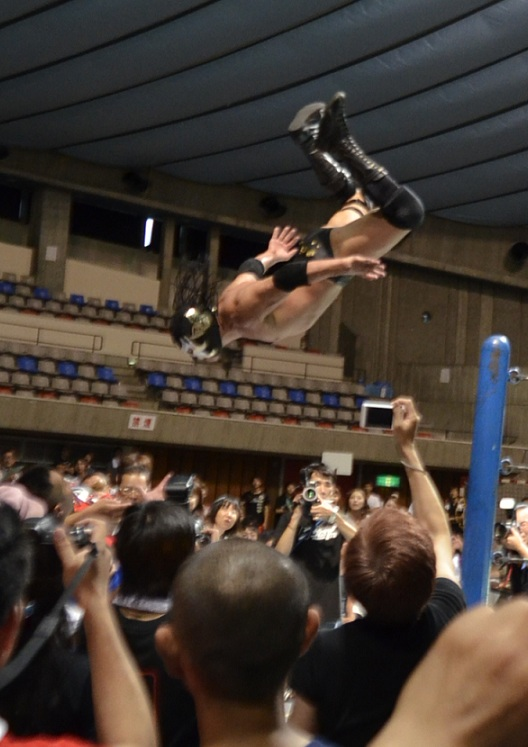
Sasuke diving out of the ring in September 2012.

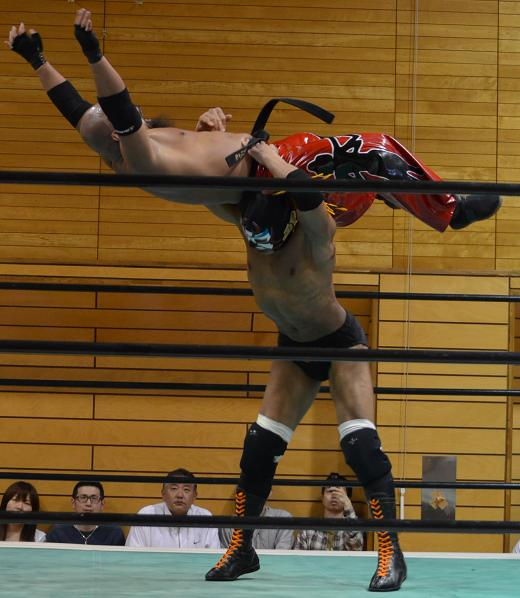
Sasuke performing a thunder fire powerbomb.

- Active Advance Pro Wrestling
  - Chiba Six Man Tag Team Championship (1 time) - with Brahman Brothers
- DDT Pro-Wrestling
  - Greater China Unified Zhongyuan Tag Team Championship (1 time) – with Ricky Fuji
- Frontier Martial-Arts Wrestling
  - FMW Independent World Junior Heavyweight Championship (1 time)
- Specialist Global Pro Wrestling
  - SGP Approved Tag Team Championship (1 time, inaugural, final) – with Ultraman Robin
  - SGP Approved Tag Team Title Tournament (2009) – with Ultraman Robin
- Japan Indie Awards
  - Best Unit Award (2014) with Brahman Kei and Brahman Shu
  - MVP Award (2008)
- Mobius
  - El Mejor De Mascara Championship (1 time, inaugural)
- Michinoku Pro Wrestling
  - British Commonwealth Junior Heavyweight Championship (2 times)
  - Tohoku Junior Heavyweight Championship (3 times)
  - Tohoku Tag Team Championship (4 times) – with Dick Togo (1), Yoshitsune (1), Brahman Kei (1) and Jinsei Shinzaki (1)
  - UWA World Tag Team Championship (1 time) – with Jinsei Shinzaki
  - Fukumen World League (2012)
  - Futaritabi Tag Team League (1995) – with Kato Kung Lee
  - Futaritabi Tag Team League (1997) – with Super Delfin
  - Michinoku Trios League (2005) – with Jinsei Shinzaki and Kesen Numajiro
- New Japan Pro-Wrestling
  - IWGP Junior Heavyweight Championship (1 time)
  - IWGP Junior Heavyweight Tag Team Championship (1 time) – with Jushin Thunder Liger
  - J-Crown (1 time)
  - NWA World Junior Heavyweight Championship (1 time)
  - NWA World Middleweight Championship (1 time)^{1}
  - NWA World Welterweight Championship (1 time)
  - UWA World Junior Light Heavyweight Championship (1 time)
  - WWA World Junior Light Heavyweight Championship (1 time)
  - WAR International Junior Heavyweight Championship (1 time)
  - J-Crown Tournament (1996)
  - One Night Eight Man Tag Team Tournament (1994) – with Gran Hamada, Shinjiro Otani and El Samurai
  - Junior Heavyweight Super Grade Tag League (1996) – with Black Tiger II
- Osaka Pro Wrestling
  - Osaka Pro Wrestling Tag Team Championship (1 time) – with Asian Cooger
- Pro Wrestling Illustrated
  - PWI ranked him # 23 of the best 500 singles wrestlers in the PWI 500 in 1996 and 1997
  - PWI ranked him # 92 of the 500 best singles wrestlers during the "PWI Years" in 2003
- Tokyo Sports
  - Topic Award (1993)
- Universal Wrestling Association / Universal Wrestling Federation
  - UWA/UWF Intercontinental Tag Team Championship (2 times) – with Gran Hamada (1) and Sasuke the Great (1)
- World Wrestling Federation / Entertainment
  - WWF Light Heavyweight Championship (2 times)^{2}
- World Wrestling Association
  - WWA World Middleweight Championship (1 time)
- Wrestling Observer Newsletter
  - Best Flying Wrestler (1994)
  - Best Wrestling Maneuver (1994) The Sasuke Special

^{1}This championship is promoted by Consejo Mundial de Lucha Libre (CMLL), it was on loan to them from New Japan Pro-Wrestling when he won it. Also, despite the title still using the NWA initials, it is no longer recognized or sanctioned as a world title by the National Wrestling Alliance. The same goes for the NWA World Middleweight Championship.
^{2}Despite winning the title twice, neither of the reigns are recognized by World Wrestling Entertainment. No reigns with the title prior to December 1997 are recognized by the WWE.
