= WWA World Junior Light Heavyweight Championship =

Professional wrestling championship

WWA World Light Heavyweight Championship (Campeonato Mundial Semi Completo de WWA)

Details
- Promotion: World Wrestling Association (WWA)
- Date established: March 11, 1989
- Current champion: Dr. Wagner, Jr.
- Date won: February 23, 2008
Statistics
- First champion: Rey Misterio Sr.
- Most reigns: El Samurai/Super Parka/Super Kendo (2 reigns)
- Longest reign: Dr wagner jr (4,801+ days)
- Shortest reign: El Samurai (1 day)

The WWA World Light Heavyweight Championship (Campeonato Mundial Semi Completo de WWA in Spanish) is a singles professional wrestling championship promoted by the Mexican Lucha Libre wrestling based promotion World Wrestling Association (WWA) since 1989. In the 1990s, the title was taken to Japan when reigning champion Gran Hamada returned to his home country. In Japan, the title became one of 8 championships that made up the New Japan Pro-Wrestling (NJPW) J-Crown Championship. When the J-Crown was broken up into individual titles the WWA World Light Heavyweight Championship returned to Mexico. The official definition of the Light Heavyweight weight class in Mexico is between 92 kg (203 lb) and 97 kg (214 lb), but is not always strictly enforced. (Note: Note>The most recent case of this is Mephisto's holding the CMLL World Welterweight Championship, a belt with a 78 kg (172 lb) upper limit despite weighing 90 kg (200 lb).)

As it was a professional wrestling championship, the championship was not won not by actual competition, but by a scripted ending to a match determined by the bookers and match makers. (Note: Hornbaker (2016) p. 550: "Professional wrestling is a sport in which match finishes are predetermined. Thus, win–loss records are not indicative of a wrestler's genuine success based on their legitimate abilities – but on now much, or how little they were pushed by promoters") On occasion the promotion declares a championship vacant, which means there is no champion at that point in time. This can either be due to a storyline, (Note: Duncan & Will (2000) p. 271, Chapter: Texas: NWA American Tag Team Title [World Class, Adkisson] "Championship held up and rematch ordered because of the interference of manager Gary Hart") or real life issues such as a champion suffering an injury being unable to defend the championship, (Note: Duncan & Will (2000) p. 20, Chapter: (United States: 19th Century & widely defended titles – NWA, WWF, AWA, IW, ECW, NWA) NWA/WCW TV Title "Rhodes stripped on 85/10/19 for not defending the belt after having his leg broken by Ric Flair and Ole & Arn Anderson") or leaving the company. (Note: Duncan & Will (2000) p. 201, Chapter: (Memphis, Nashville) Memphis: USWA Tag Team Title "Vacant on 93/01/18 when Spike leaves the USWA.")

In 2005 Filoso, a wrestler from Pro Wrestling ZERO1, was billed as the WWA World Junior Light Heavyweight Champion, using the same title belt that had been used as part of the J-Crown and it had not been returned to the WWA. Even though Filoso never actually won the belt, he did defend the title, losing it in his first defense. The title is used by Zero1 but only shares the name of the World Junior Light Heavyweight Championship, not its lineage.

== Title history ==
=== Official WWA championship ===
Key
No.	Overall reign number
Reign	Reign number for the specific champion
Days	Number of days held
N/A	Unknown information

No.	Champion	Championship change			Reign statistics		Notes	Ref.
No.	Champion	Date	Event	Location	Reign	Days	Notes	Ref.
1	Rey Misterio Sr.	March 11, 1989	Live event	Tijuana	1	344	Defeated Fishman to become first Champion	(Note: Duncan & Will (2000) p. 400, Chapter: "Mexico: World Wrestling Association (Benjamin Mora) WWA Junior Light Heavyweight Title")
2	Fishman	February 18, 1990	Live event	Tijuana	1	113		
3	Villano IV	June 11, 1990	Live event	Tijuana	1	1,285		
4	Gran Hamada	December 17, 1993	Live event	Tokyo, Japan	1	960		
5	El Samurai	August 3, 1996	Live event	Tokyo, Japan	1	1		
6	The Great Sasuke §	August 4, 1996	Live event	Tokyo, Japan	1	99	Became one of eight championships comprising New Japan Pro-Wrestling's J-Crown Championship	
7	Último Dragón §	November 11, 1996	Live event	Osaka, Japan	1	54		
8	Jushin Thunder Liger §	January 4, 1997	Wrestling World 1997	Tokyo, Japan	1	183		
9	El Samurai §	July 6, 1997	Live event	Sapporo, Japan	2	35		
10	Shinjiro Otani §	August 10, 1997	Live event	Nagoya, Japan	1	87		
—	Vacated	November 5, 1997	—	—	—	—	Championship vacated after the J-Crown championship is divided back into the original championships.	
11	Halloween	September 16, 1999	Live event	Tijuana	1	197	Defeated Super Parka in tournament finals for vacated title.	
12	Super Parka	March 31, 2000	Live event	Tijuana	1	760		
13	Super Kendo	April 30, 2002	Live event	Tijuana	1	35		
14	Super Parka	June 2, 2002	Live event	Ensenada, Baja California	2			
15	Super Kendo	June 2004	Live event	California	2			
16	Inferno	July 23, 2004	Live event	Tijuana	1	1,250		
17	Nicho El Millonario	December 25, 2007	Live event	Rosarito, Baja California	1	60		
18	Dr. Wagner Jr.	February 23, 2008	Live event	Tijuana, Baja California	1	6,386+	Dr. Wagner wins match where his UWA World Heavyweight Championship is also at stake.	

=== Pro Wrestling ZERO1 version (disputed branch) ===
Key
No.	Overall reign number
Reign	Reign number for the specific champion
Days	Number of days held
+	Current reign is changing daily

No.	Champion	Championship change			Reign statistics		Notes	Ref.
No.	Champion	Date	Event	Location	Reign	Days	Notes	Ref.
1	Filoso	July 2005	Live event	N/A	1		Filoso never defeated anyone to win the title but it was promoted as if he did, this was a Phantom title change	
2	Osamu Namiguchi	August 24, 2005	Live event	Nagano, Japan	1	7		
3	Katsuhiko Nakajima	August 31, 2005	Live event	Hiroshima, Japan	1	297		
4	Tatsuhito Takaiwa	June 24, 2006	Live event	Tokyo, Japan	1	8		
—	Vacated	July 2, 2006	—	—	—	—	Championship vacated and later abandoned	
5	The★ZEST	July 22, 2007	Live event	Yamagata, Japan	1	261	Defeated Osamu Namiguchi in decision match to revive the Title	
6	NOIZ	April 6, 2008	Miracle Rocket ~2nd Impact~	Tokyo, Japan	2	77	Defeated an unknown person wrestling as "The★ZEST" as Takuya Sugi portrayed both masked wrestlers.	
—	Vacated	June 22, 2008	—	—	—	—	Championship vacated when Sugi leaves the promotion; abandoned	
