= Shinjiro Otani =

Japanese professional wrestler (born 1972)

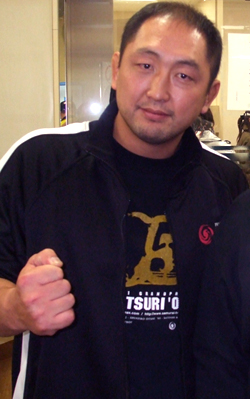
- Otani in 2008

Personal information
- Born: July 21, 1972 (age 54) Yamaguchi City, Yamaguchi Prefecture, Japan

Professional wrestling career
- Ring name(s): Achichi; Mr. Otani; Shinjiro Otani
- Billed height: 1.80 m (5 ft 11 in)
- Billed weight: 97 kg (214 lb)
- Trained by: Animal Hamaguchi; Hiroshi Hase; Kensuke Sasaki
- Debut: June 25, 1992

Shinjiro Otani (大谷晋二郎, Ōtani Shinjirō; born July 21, 1972) is a Japanese semi-retired professional wrestler and the current acting president of Pro Wrestling Zero1 (Zero1). He is currently inactive from pro-wrestling competition due to a cervical spine injury sustained in April 2022. A product of the New Japan Pro Wrestling (NJPW) dojo, Otani is best known for his longtime association with Zero1, a promotion he founded in 2001 along with Shinya Hashimoto.

Starting his career in NJPW as a junior heavyweight, Otani gained a reputation as a gutsy underdog and would go on to hold several championships during his nine-year run with the promotion, including the IWGP Junior Heavyweight Championship and the J-Crown, as well as forming a successful tag team with dojo classmate Tatsuhito Takaiwa, twice holding the IWGP Junior Heavyweight Tag Team Championship. After jumping to the heavyweight division in 2001, Otani would leave New Japan the same year, joining Shinya Hashimoto as one of the founders of Pro Wrestling Zero1 (Zero1). Following the departure of Hashimoto in 2004, Otani was pushed as one of the promotions top stars, becoming a six time Intercontinental Tag Team Champion, a one time World Heavyweight Champion and a four-time winner of the Fire Festival. In addition to his role as a wrestler, Otani has also served as acting company president since 2007.

== Early life ==
Otani was born in Yamaguchi and was a big pro wrestling fan during his youth, specifically Antonio Inoki's New Japan Pro Wrestling (NJPW). He attended the only two events NJPW ran in Yamaguchi yearly and idolised Kengo Kimura. At one point during his childhood, he snuck into a hotel in a bid to try and meet Antonio Inoki; initially stopped by security, they allowed him in upon Inoki's instruction, who signed Otani's "闘魂" (fighting spirit) hachimaki, after which the young Otani vowed to Inoki that he would one day make it to NJPW. Otani was successful in amateur wrestling during high school.

== Professional wrestling career ==
=== Training ===
Upon graduation, Otani planned to move almost 600 miles from Yamaguchi to Tokyo to join a professional wrestling dojo. Otani's dream was strongly opposed by his parents, which resulted in him running away from home in January 1992 at the age of 19, leaving for Tokyo with only between ¥50,000-¥60,000 of otoshidama money to his name. After being homeless for a brief period of time, Otani finally found a place to stay, a small tatami-like dwelling for ¥24,000, located next to a public toilet and without a futon to sleep on.

At the time, the only wrestling school Otani knew of was Animal Hamaguchi's dojo, where he would travel and introduce himself to Hamaguchi. Hamaguchi accepted Otani into his dojo where he began his training, in addition to feeding him and getting Otani a part-time job in a local liquor store, which allowed him to pay for better living quarters. Hamaguchi brought Otani to the NJPW dojo in February 1992 and he enrolled soon after, training in the same class as Tatsuhito Takaiwa and Yuji Nagata. As part of his rookie duties, Otani would also spend two years working closely with Shinya Hashimoto as his assistant, which led to the two developing a long-lasting friendship.

=== New Japan Pro Wrestling (1992–2001) ===
==== Early career (1992–1996) ====
Otani made his in-ring debut on June 25, 1992, losing to Hiroyoshi Yamamoto at a house show in Fukushima. His televised debut came a little under a month later, losing to Osamu Nishimura in Gifu. Otani spent much of 1992 and 1993 trading wins and losses with fellow dojo classmates such as Tatsuhito Takaiwa, Tokimitsu Ishizawa and Yuji Nagata, customary for younger wrestlers in Japan as they develop and earn their place within the company. He became known for his springboard dropkick, his corner face wash, and developed a reputation as a likeable underdog thanks to his sympathetic performances and his willingness to challenge senior wrestlers, in particular Jushin Thunder Liger. The two met for the first time on May 25, 1993, in a Top of the Super Juniors tournament match in Korakuen Hall, with Liger victorious. Otani would struggle throughout his first foray into the tournament, failing to advance past the first stage but managing to earn a solitary win over Eddie Guerrero in Hamamatsu.

Otani represented NJPW during their feud with Wrestle Association-R (WAR) on January 16, 1994, losing to Masao Orihara at a WAR's Super Revolution event. He would once again enter the renamed Best of the Super Juniors tournament that summer and performed much better, defeating the likes of Taka Michinoku and Black Tiger, however also once again losing to Jushin Liger and failing to advance to the finals. In October, he partnered up with Wild Pegasus for the Super Grade Junior Heavyweight Tag League. The two would reach the semi-finals on October 18, beating Dean Malenko and Tokimitsu Ishizawa to book their place in the final, where they defeated Black Tiger and The Great Sasuke in a highly acclaimed bout to win the tournament, giving Otani his first taste of success in the company. His strong performances throughout 1994 earned him his first IWGP Junior Heavyweight Championship opportunity on October 30, however, he was unable to overcome champion Norio Honaga and lost by referee's decision at Ryogoku Kokugikan. He received a big opportunity at the annual "Dream Win" card on October 30, where he was defeated by Keiji Muto, one of the top stars of New Japan in a singles match.

Otani won the first championship of his career on December 13, 1994, beating Norio Honaga to win the UWA World Welterweight Championship. After two successful defences, he dropped the title to IWGP Junior Heavyweight Champion Koji Kanemoto in a double title match on April 16 in Hiroshima. Otani would turn his attention to the Best of the Super Juniors tournament in June where he would have his best outing to date, making it all the way to the final where he was narrowly defeated by former partner Wild Pegasus.

==== Championship success (1996–2000) ====
By 1996, Otani had firmly established himself as a serious contender for the IWGP Junior Heavyweight Championship, and unsuccessfully challenged Jushin Thunder Liger for the title in the main event of a card in Amagasaki on March 17. Just days later on March 20, he defeated Wild Pegasus to become the inaugural WCW Cruiserweight Champion; he held the title until May 2, when he was defeated by Dean Malenko in Orlando, Florida (the match would air on the May 18, 1996 edition of WCW Worldwide). On June 17, he captured the vacant UWA World Junior Lightweight Championship, beating UWFi representative Kazushi Sakuraba. He held the title until August, when he was one of the wrestlers who entered their championship into the J-Crown; his defeat to Ultimo Dragon in the semi-final of the inaugural J-Crown Champion tournament meant that he relinquished the UWA World Junior Lightweight Championship.

On August 10, 1997, Otaini won the J-Crown, defeating El Samurai in Nagoya. After his third successful defence against Wild Pegasus in November, the World Wrestling Federation ordered its Light Heavyweight Championship to be returned to them; in the aftermath, Otani relinquished all belts except for the IWGP Junior Heavyweight Championship, returning all other titles to their respective promotions and effectively dissolving the J-Crown. Otani would continue to solely defend the IWGP Junior Heavyweight Championship until February 1998, when he dropped the title to Jushin Thunder Liger.

After an unsuccessful Best of the Super Juniors tournament in summer 1998, Otani turned his attention to the emerging junior tag team division in New Japan; with the introduction of the IWGP Junior Heavyweight Tag Team Championships, a tournament was announced to crown the inaugural champions in July, where Otani would partner dojo classmate Tatsuhito Takaiwa, with the two of them defeating Koji Kanemoto and Dr Wagner Jr in the finals to become the first ever holders of the belts. On December 11, Takaiwa and Otani travelled to Wrestle Association R where they defeated Masaaki Mochizuki and Masao Orihara to win the vacant International Junior Heavyweight Tag Team Championship, making themselves double champions. Their days as double champions didn't last long, however, as they would lose the IWGP Junior Heavyweight Tag Team Championship to Kendo Kashin and Dr Wagner Jr at Wrestling World 1999. Later in the year they would regain the championships, defeating Jushin Thunder Liger and The Great Sasuke in July.

In 2000, both Otani and Takaiwa took part in the Best of the Super Juniors tournament, with both men winning their blocks and reaching the final, where, on June 9, Takaiwa defeated Otani to win the 2000 Best of the Super Juniors. Later in the month after just under a year as champions, Otani and Takaiwa lost the IWGP Junior Heavyweight Tag Team Championships to the Junior Stars (Koji Kanemoto and Minoru Tanaka). After dropping the titles, both men would go their separate ways, with Takaiwa focusing on the IWGP Junior Heavyweight Championship and Otani beginning to be groomed for a run as a heavyweight.

==== Division change and departure (2000–2001) ====
After a largely lacklustre summer of 2000, Otani was sent on excursion by New Japan officials in August, with the intention of him gaining weight and returning as a heavyweight. Otani toured with All Star Wrestling (ASW) in the United Kingdom and spent time training under Tokyo Joe in Canada, where he developed his new King Cobra Clutch finishing move. Otani returned to New Japan on January 4, 2001, teaming with Keiji Muto as a member of Muto's new Bad Ass Translate Trading stable, to convincingly defeat Manabu Nakanishi and Jushin Thunder Liger, who, like Otani, had also been converted into a heavyweight; Otani would submit Liger for the win with his new King Cobra Clutch. The following month, he would unsuccessfully challenge Kensuke Sasaki for the IWGP Heavyweight Championship on February 16 in Ryogoku Kokugikan. This would go on to be Otani's last match signed to the company, as he would depart New Japan after nine years soon after to help Shinya Hashimoto found his new promotion, Pro Wrestling Zero-One.

=== Pro Wrestling Zero1 (2001–present) ===
==== Formation (2000–2004) ====
In November 2000, during Otani's time spent overseas, it was announced by longtime associate and former ace of NJPW Shinya Hashimoto, who had recently been fired by the company, that Otani was one of the names that would be joining him in his new promotion, Zero-One. At the time, Otani had not yet agreed to join the promotion, and in 2019, he said that this premature announcement was what led to him leaving New Japan, the promotion he had loved since his childhood, so suddenly. Hashimoto would meet with Otani and apologise for using his name without permission upon his return to Japan, but said that he had only done so because Otani was the main person he wished to see compete in Zero1, and that Otani was free to stay with New Japan if he wished. Otani, convinced by Hashimoto's words and concerned about Hashimoto feeling alone after his firing from New Japan, agreed to join Zero1 as one of the founders. Otani would relay his decision to New Japan officials soon after, who accepted his decision; he was also told by then head-booker Riki Choshu that the door was always open for a potential return in the future.

Otani competed on the inaugural Zero1 card on March 2, 2001, remaining a heavyweight and beginning his feud with MMA fighter turned pro-wrestler Kazunari Murakami. Otani lost their first meeting by referee's decision, a wild and scrappy brawl that lasted less than five minutes. As a result of Zero1's working relationship with Battlarts, Otani would have a brief run with the promotion around this time, where he formed an alliance with Yuki Ishikawa. The two would also team up in Zero1, defeating Steve Corino and Mike Rapada to win the NWA Intercontinental Tag Team Championship on July 12 in Tokyo. In September, Otani entered the inaugural Himatsuri (火祭り), "fire festival" tournament, remaining undefeated on his way to the final where he defeated Kohei Sato. As a result of winning, Otani was presented with the Fire Sword for the first time, an accessory that would go on to be commonly associated with his ring entrance. Otani and Ishikawa would vacate their championships in October 2001, after Ishikawa's departure from the promotion. Otani would instead form a new tag team with Masato Tanaka, collectively known as "Emblem". The duo won the vacant championships on January 6, 2002, defeating Samoa Joe and Tom Howard. In singles action, Otani entered the now round-robin Fire Festival once again in August, winning all but one of his matches and defeating Tetsuhiro Kuroda in the final to become a two-time Fire Festival winner, retaining the Fire Sword for another year. After ten months and five successful defences as champions, Otani and Tanaka dropped their titles to John Heidenreich and Nathan Jones in Korakuen Hall on October 20. By this time, the two had established themselves as one of the best tag teams in Japan, and were invited by All Japan Pro Wrestling (AJPW) to compete in its Real World Tag League in late 2002. Four wins and a solitary defeat to Keiji Muto and Animal Warrior was enough to see them through to the final, where they were defeated by Satoshi Kojima and Taiyo Kea in the main event at Nippon Budokan on December 6. The two would also briefly tour with Mitsuharu Misawa's Pro Wrestling Noah in January 2003, the highlight of their run being a memorable if unsuccessful GHC Tag Team Championship match against Jun Akiyama and Akitoshi Saito in Budokan.

Back in Zero1, Otani looked to win his third successive Fire Festival tournament and again made it to the final, though, this time, he was defeated by AJPW representative Satoshi Kojima. Otani would get his revenge over in AJPW on September 6, when he defeated Kojima in the semi-final of the vacant Triple Crown Heavyweight Championship tournament, though he was later defeated by Toshiaki Kawada in the final.

==== Main event push (2004–2007) ====
As 2004 progressed, Otani began to be pushed as one of Zero1's top stars, starting in April when he was narrowly defeated by former partner and then-current NWA United National Heavyweight Champion Masato Tanaka, the beginning of a rivalry between the former partners. The two would have several steel cage matches against each other throughout the summer, as Otani formed an alliance with Takao Omori after he was betrayed by former ally Wataru Sakata, who instead formed a new tag team with Tanaka. This culminated in a sixty-minute, ten-man elimination cage death match on October 16 in Sapporo, as Otani's team of himself, Omori, Ikuto Hidaka, Minoru Fujita and Tomohiro Ishii defeated Tanaka, Sakata, Jun Kasai, Tetsuhiro Kuroda and Yoshihito Sasaki after Hidaka last eliminated Kuroda for the win. Upon Hashimoto's departure from Zero1 in late 2004, after which he retained the rights to the Zero1 name, Otani would take over Hashimoto's role as owner of the promotion in 2005 and re-introduced it in Korakuen Hall as Pro-Wrestling Zero-One Max. In August 2005, Otani would enter the fifth annual Fire Festival, again reaching the final where he defeated Kensuke Sasaki to win his third tournament.

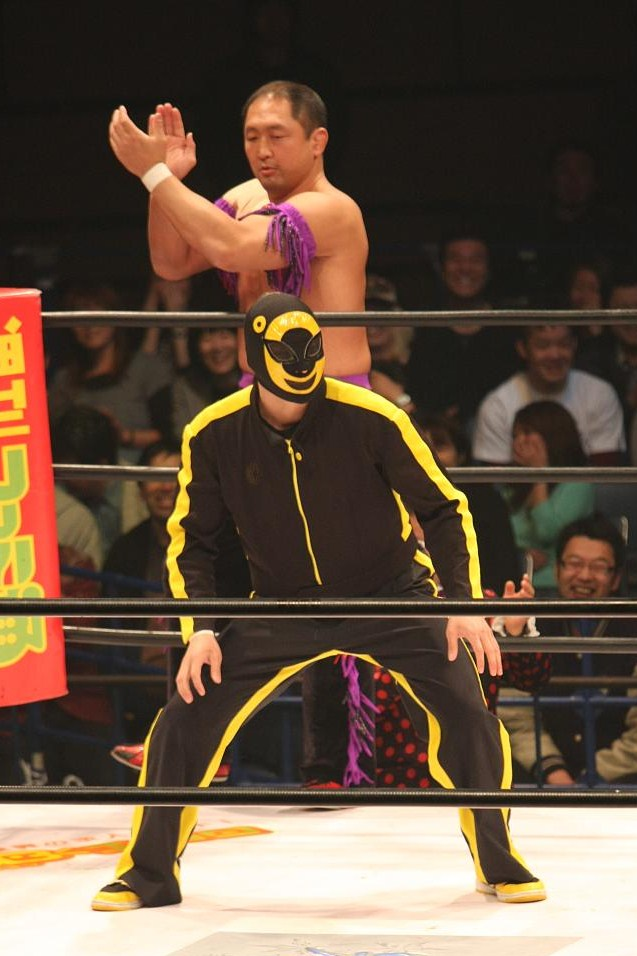
Otani (background) cheers on Monster C during a Hustle event.

After taking over Zero1, he would establish a working partnership with Dream Stage Entertainment, which led to Otani making regular appearances in DSE's comedy wrestling promotion, Hustle. Initially appearing under his own name, Otani was later renamed to Achichi Otani, a character that seemed to gain the power of fire, as Otani would seemingly burn opponents and partners with a single touch. Otani would also establish a working relationship between Zero-One Max and New Japan Pro Wrestling, which led to Otani appearing in a New Japan ring for the first time since February 2001 on October 8, 2005, in the Tokyo Dome. Otani and his Zero-One Max team of Kamikaze, Ryoji Sai and Kohei Sato were defeated by Hiroyoshi Tenzan, Takashi Iizuka, Naofumi Yamamoto and Yutaka Yoshie. He would again return to New Japan on January 4, 2006, in the same venue, re-igniting his feud with old rival and ally Koji Kanemoto where Otani was victorious in singles action. Back in Zero-One Max, Otani defeated Steve Corino on January 22 to win the AWA World Heavyweight Championship, the first major heavyweight singles title of Otani's career. Otani held the title until April 1, when he dropped it to Takao Omori.

==== Championship pursuits (2007–2015) ====
On December 24, 2007, it was announced by Zero-One Max's parent company, First On Stage, that Otani would solely take over from Yoshiyuki Nakamura as president of Zero-One Max, taking office on January 23, 2008, as Nakamura became the new director of First On Stage. After taking over as president, Otani further expanded the promotion's working deal with NJPW, which led to an inter-promotional feud between the two beginning in 2008. As a result of this, Otani would enter his first G1 Climax in August 2008, where he earned 7 points, though a defeat against Hiroshi Tanahashi prevented him from advancing past the first stage. On February 27, 2009, at a Zero-One Max event in Korakuen Hall, he defeated former NJPW dojo classmate Yuji Nagata to become the new World Heavyweight Champion. Otani held the belt until March, successfully defending it against Steve Corino and Orlando Colón before dropping it to Ryoji Sai on March 29. On October 12, 2009, at Masahiro Chono's 25th anniversary event in Ryogoku Kokugikan, Otani received his first opportunity at the IWGP Heavyweight Championship in over nine years, challenging Shinsuke Nakamura. Despite entering to a mixed reaction as an outsider, Otani's performance would prompt a loud reaction from the audience, who, by the end, were cheering for Otani, even though he was narrowly defeated by Nakamura.

In late 2009, Otani formed a new partnership with former sumo wrestler Akebono, prior to the upcoming Furinkazan tag tournament, dubbing themselves "Kazan" (火山, volcano). The two reached the final on December 19, where they defeated Masaaki Mochizuki and Otani's former Emblem partner Masato Tanaka to win the tournament. A month later in Tokyo, they beat Ikuto Hidaka and Munenori Sawa to win the NWA Intercontinental Tag Team Championship. In August 2010, he entered the Fire Festival tied with Masato Tanaka for the most tournament wins at three; Otani progressed to the final, where he defeated Tanaka to become the first ever four-time winner of the tournament. Otani would try and once again capture the World Heavyweight Championship in November, but fell to champion Daisuke Sekimoto. On March 6, 2011, Otani competed in the main event of Zero1's special 10th anniversary card in Ryogoku Kokugikan, where he would lose to Yoshihiro Takayama. This event also saw the debut of Daichi Hashimoto, the son of Otani's since deceased longtime associate Shinya Hashimoto. Both Otani and Masahiro Chono handled his training, and Otani would go on to become a frequent tag team partner for the young Hashimoto during his early career in Zero1.

Otani would unite with former rivals Koji Kanemoto and Osamu Nishimura in NJPW for one night only in October 2011, where they were defeated by the reunited Okami Gundan team of Hiroyoshi Tenzan, Masahiro Chono and Hiro Saito, in the main event of Tenzan's 20th anniversary event in Korakuen Hall. He would later reunite with Keiji Muto in the Tokyo Dome, at Wrestle Kingdom 7, replacing the injured Daichi Hashimoto as the two were defeated by Tencozy (Hiroyoshi Tenzan and Satoshi Kojima). Beginning in September 2015, Otani downgraded himself back to the junior heavyweight division, proclaiming that the division had "lost its way" and "needed more heart". On September 23, he reformed his junior heavyweight team with Tatsuhito Takaiwa and defeated NWA International Lightweight Tag Team Champions Takuya Sugawara and Brother Yasshi to win the titles, the team's fourth tag team title overall and their first in 15 years. On October 11 Otani defeated Minoru Tanaka (who had defeated him and Takaiwa in 2000, along with Koji Kanemoto, to end their second IWGP junior tag reign) to win both the Zero1 International and NWA World Junior Heavyweight Championships. After three successful defenses, he lost the titles to Kotaro Suzuki on February 3, 2017.

==== Later career and injury (2016–2022) ====
After Otani won Real Japan Pro Wrestling (RJPW)'s Legend Championship in 2016, he again began occasionally competing in the heavyweight division. He held the title until June 2017, when he dropped it to Masakatsu Funaki, the man he initially defeated to win the title. On June 22, 2019, at 46 years old, he challenged Daisuke Sekimoto for the World Heavyweight Championship. Otani was defeated after a hard-fought 22 minute match, but earned plaudits from the crowd for the strong effort he displayed. He again returned to New Japan Pro Wrestling on January 4, 2020, taking part in one of Jushin Thunder Liger's retirement matches, where he, Tatsuhito Takaiwa, Ryusuke Taguchi and Naoki Sano defeated Liger, Tatsumi Fujinami, The Great Sasuke and Tiger Mask. In December, Otani allied himself with Yumehito Imanari for the upcoming Furinkazan, where the NWA Intercontinental Tag Team Championship would be awarded to the winner. Otani and Imanari defeated the Kubota Brothers (Yasu and Hide) in the final to win the tournament and the titles. In August 2021 he entered what would be his last Fire Festival, reaching the final where he fell to Takuya Sugawara.

On April 10, 2022, Otani was booked to challenge Pro Wrestling Noah (Noah)'s Takashi Sugiura for Zero1's World Heavyweight Championship at Zero1's anniversary event in Ryogoku Kokugikan. At one point in the match, Otani became unresponsive after taking a German suplex into the turnbuckles. Otani was transported to hospital, where he awoke, however, he was unable to move his limbs; he was diagnosed with a cervical spinal injury. It was later announced he would undergo surgery on April 13, which was successful, after which Otani was moved to another hospital to begin further treatment and rehabilitation for his injuries.

== Personal life ==
Otani married his wife Eriko on February 16, 2014.

== Championships and accomplishments ==
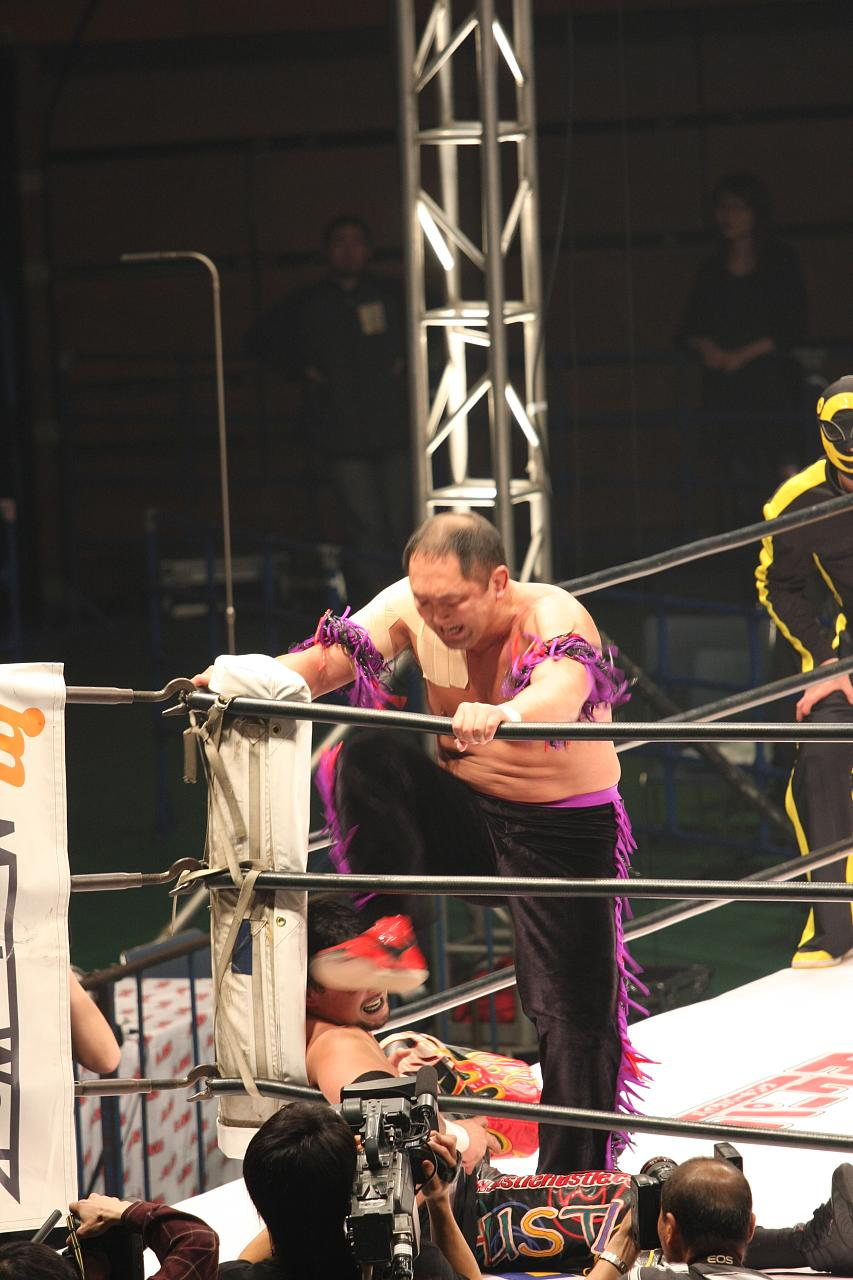
Otani performing his signature corner facewash on Tajiri.

- Hustle
  - Hustle King Hashimoto Memorial Six-Man Tag Tournament (2006) – with Tadao Yasuda and Masato Tanaka
- New Japan Pro-Wrestling
  - IWGP Junior Heavyweight Championship (1 time)
  - IWGP Junior Heavyweight Tag Team Championship (2 times) – with Tatsuhito Takaiwa
  - J-Crown (1 time)
  - NWA World Welterweight Championship (2 times)
  - UWA World Junior Light Heavyweight Championship (2 times)
  - UWA World Welterweight Championship (1 time)
  - WCW Cruiserweight Championship (1 time, inaugural)
  - WWA World Junior Light Heavyweight Championship (1 time)
  - WWF Light Heavyweight Championship (1 time)
  - Super Grade Junior Heavyweight Tag League (1994) – with Wild Pegasus
  - One Night Eight Man Tag Team Tournament (1994) – with El Samurai, Gran Hamada and Great Sasuke
  - IWGP Junior Heavyweight Tag Team Title League (1998) - with Tatsuhito Takaiwa
  - Yuke's Cup Tag Tournament (2008) – with Hiroyoshi Tenzan
- Nikkan Sports
  - Fighting Spirit Award (2002)
- Premier Wrestling Federation
  - PWF Universal Tag Team Championship (1 time) – with Masato Tanaka
- Pro Wrestling Illustrated
  - PWI ranked him #125 of the top 500 singles wrestlers of the "PWI Years" in 2003
  - PWI also ranked him #42 of the 100 best tag teams of the "PWI Years" with Tatsuhito Takaiwa in 2003
- Pro Wrestling Zero1
  - AWA Superstars of Wrestling World Heavyweight Championship (1 time)
  - International Junior Heavyweight Championship (1 time)
  - NWA Intercontinental Tag Team Championship (7 times) – with Yuki Ishikawa (1), Masato Tanaka (2), Akebono (1), Takao Omori (1), Kamikaze (1) and Yumehito Imanari (1)
  - NWA International Lightweight Tag Team Championship (2 times) – with Tatsuhito Takaiwa
  - NWA World Junior Heavyweight Championship (1 time)
  - World Heavyweight Championship (1 time)
  - Fire Festival (2001, 2002, 2005, 2010)
  - Furinkazan (2009) – with Akebono (2009)
  - Five-Man Tag Team Tournament (2015) – with Masato Tanaka, Kohei Sato, Hideki Suzuki and Yusaku Obata
- Real Japan Pro Wrestling
  - Legend Championship (1 time)
- Tokyo Sports
  - Best Tag Team Award (2002) – with Masato Tanaka
  - Rookie of the Year (1993) – tied with Jinsei Shinzaki
- Wrestle Association "R"
  - WAR International Junior Heavyweight Tag Team Championship (1 time) – with Tatsuhito Takaiwa
- Wrestling Observer Newsletter awards
  - Best Technical Wrestler (1999)
  - Tag Team of the Year (1998) with Tatsuhito Takaiwa

^{1}The championship was won in Tokyo, Japan as part of an interpromotional card between New Japan Pro-Wrestling and World Championship Wrestling.
