= WWF Light Heavyweight Championship =

Former professional wrestling championship

- The WWF Light Heavyweight Championship belt with the WWF scratch logo (c. 2001)

Details
- Promotion: Universal Wrestling Association (March 26, 1981 – June 16, 1995); Michinoku Pro Wrestling (June 16, 1995 – November 5, 1997); World Wrestling Federation (November 5, 1997 – March 8, 2002)
- Date established: March 26, 1981; December 7, 1997 (as per WWE's official title history)
- Date retired: March 8, 2002

Other name
- WWF Light Heavyweight Championship (1981–2002)
Statistics
- First champions: Perro Aguayo; Taka Michinoku (as per WWE's official title history)
- Final champion: X-Pac
- Most reigns: Perro Aguayo and Villano III (7 reigns)
- Longest reign: Villano III (826 days)
- Shortest reign: Perro Aguayo and Scotty 2 Hotty (8 days)
- Oldest champion: Perro Aguayo (43 years, 9 months)
- Youngest champion: Essa Rios (21 years, 63 days)
- Heaviest champion: Shinjiro Otani (236 lb (107 kg))
- Lightest champion: The Great Sasuke (180 lb (82 kg; 13 st))

The WWF Light Heavyweight Championship was a professional wrestling championship in the World Wrestling Federation (WWF, now WWE) promotion. The title was challenged by light heavyweights at a maximum weight of 215 lb (98 kg) (before deactivation, the weight limit was changed to 220 lb (100 kg)). It was created on March 26, 1981, for the Universal Wrestling Association (UWA) in a partnership between the WWF and UWA. On June 16, 1995, the title moved to Michinoku Pro Wrestling, but due to WWF's ownership of the title, it was returned to the WWF in 1997, the year which WWE recognizes as the beginning of the championship's lineage. The inaugural champion in UWA was Perro Aguayo, however, the WWE considers the inaugural champion to be Taka Michinoku, with his reign beginning on December 7, 1997. It was retired on March 8, 2002, with X-Pac as the final champion.

== History ==
=== 1997 tournament ===
Quarterfinals (Raw is War)
Nov. 3	Águila	Pin
Hershey	Super Loco	5:12
Nov. 10	Taka Michinoku	Pin
Ottawa	Devon Storm	5:00
Nov. 11^{1}	Eric Shelley	Pin
Cornwall	Scott Taylor^{4}	5:27
Nov. 24	Brian Christopher	Pin
Fayetteville	Flash Flanagan	3:30

Semifinals (Raw is War)
Nov. 25^{2}	Águila	Pin
Roanoke	Taka Michinoku	6:19
Nov. 25^{2}	Scott Taylor	Forf^{3}
Roanoke	Brian Christopher

Finals (D-Generation X: In Your House)
Dec. 7	Taka Michinoku	Pin
Springfield	Brian Christopher	12:00

Notes:
^{1} This match aired on November 17.
^{2} These matches aired on December 1.
^{3} Christopher won by forfeit after Kane chokeslammed Taylor before Christopher made his way to the ring, leaving Taylor unable to compete.
^{4} Per brackets displayed early in the tournament, Jerry Lynn was originally slated to face Eric Shelley. He was replaced by Scott Taylor.

=== Title deactivation ===
In March 2001, the World Wrestling Federation purchased World Championship Wrestling (WCW). Following the conclusion of the Invasion angle at the 2001 Survivor Series pay-per-view, the WWF Light Heavyweight Championship was abandoned in favor of the WCW Cruiserweight Championship (a unification match at Survivor Series was cancelled due to X-Pac's injury). The Light Heavyweight Championship was defended by X-Pac at house shows until March 8, 2002, when the WWF finally deactivated the title. Simultaneously, the WCW Cruiserweight Championship was rebranded as the WWF Cruiserweight Championship. It would become the WWE Cruiserweight Championship in accordance with the company's name change in May 2002, and it would be defended until September 2007.

== Reigns ==
The WWF Light Heavyweight Championship was first introduced in Japan in a tournament which ended with Perro Aguayo defeating Gran Hamada to become the first recognized champion. It then migrated to the US West Coast before transitioning to Mexico and then later being defended once again in Japan by way of the Michinoku Pro Wrestling promotion. The title would later become popularized and widely defended within the confines of the World Wrestling Federation in 1997, when a tournament was held in the United States to crown a champion. Before the tournament, the title was previously considered a part of the much venerated J-Crown.

== See also ==
- WCW Light Heavyweight Championship
- WWA Light Heavyweight Championship
