= Super J-Cup (2000) =

Super J-Cup: 3rd Stage
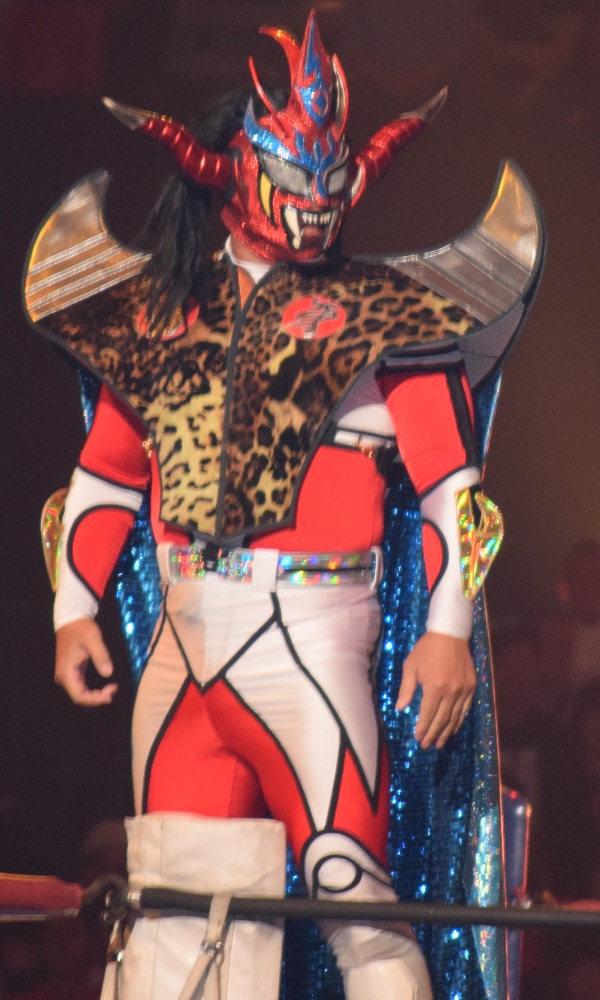
- Tournament winner Jushin Thunder Liger
- Venue: Night One: Sendai City Gymnasium; Night Two: Sumo Hall
- Location: Night One: Sendai, Japan; Night Two: Tokyo, Japan
- Start date: April 1, 2000
- End date: April 9, 2000

Champion
- Jushin Thunder Liger

Super J-Cup: 3rd Stage was the third Super J-Cup professional wrestling tournament, it was hosted by Michinoku Pro Wrestling (MPW). The tournament was a single-elimination tournament of four rounds and was a two-night event featuring junior heavyweights from various Japanese promotions. The first round of the event was held on April 1, 2000 at Sendai City Gymnasium in Sendai, Japan and the final three rounds were held on April 9, 2000 at Sumo Hall in Tokyo, Japan, which had been the site for the previous two tournaments. This event marked the first time that the Super J-Cup was held at an additional venue rather than Sumo Hall.

The 1995 winner Jushin Thunder Liger won the tournament for the second consecutive time by defeating Cima in the final round. In non-tournament matches, Abismo Negro defeated El Oriental, a ten-man tag team match took place and Chaparita Asari retained the WWWA Super Lightweight Championship, marking the first time that a championship was defended at Super J-Cup and women wrestlers competed at Super J-Cup.

== Background ==
Super J-Cup was conceived by New Japan Pro-Wrestling's (NJPW) junior heavyweight booker Jushin Thunder Liger. The idea was to host an interpromotional single elimination tournament, bringing junior heavyweight wrestlers from several promotions from Japan and all over the world to give an opportunity to junior heavyweight wrestlers to showcase their talent on a national level and achieve stardom. Many wrestlers benefited from the inaugural tournament in 1994, which was critically acclaimed and was a commercial success.

A year later, Wrestle Association R (WAR) held the second edition of the tournament in 1995, which sold out Sumo Hall again with the same crowd of 11,500. The event itself was a success and earned critical acclaim but was not equivalent to its predecessor. After a five-year hiatus, Michinoku Pro Wrestling (MPW) decided to host the tournament in 2000 in an attempt to revive the junior heavyweight wrestling and Jushin Thunder Liger cooperated with The Great Sasuke and MPW to participate in the tournament. Most of the participants were from Japan while some participants were also invited from North America to participate in the tournament. The event was called Super J-Cup: 3rd Stage and marked the first time that the tournament was being held at some other venue rather than Sumo Hall as the first round matches were held at Sendai City Gymnasium in Sendai, Japan on April 1 and the next three rounds would be held at Sumo Hall.

== Qualifying matches ==
Big Japan Pro Wrestling (BJW) held a qualification tournament with the winner representing BJW in the 2000 Super J-Cup.

February 23, 2000 (Odawara Arena in Odawara, Kanagawa)
No.	Results	Stipulations	Times
1	Masayoshi Motegi defeated The Winger	2000 Super J-Cup Qualification Tournament first round match	15:22
2	Men's Teioh defeated Ryuji Ito	2000 Super J-Cup Qualification Tournament first round match	11:00

February 29, 2000 (Kumagaya City Gymnasium in Kumagaya, Saitama)
No.	Results	Stipulations	Times
1	Masayoshi Motegi defeated Fantastik	2000 Super J-Cup Qualification Tournament semi-final match	9:55
2	Men's Teioh defeated Guerrero del Futuro	2000 Super J-Cup Qualification Tournament semi-final match	13:02

March 2, 2000 (Kawasaki City Gymnasium in Kawasaki, Kanagawa)
No.	Results	Stipulations	Times
1	Men's Teioh defeated Masayoshi Motegi	2000 Super J-Cup Qualification Tournament final match	8:50

Tournament brackets

Quarterfinals
Ryuji Ito	Pin
Men's Teioh	11:00
Masayoshi Motegi	Pin
The Winger	15:22

Semifinals
Guerrero del Futuro	Pin
Men's Teioh	13:02
Masayoshi Motegi	Pin
Fantastik	9:55

Finals
Men's Teioh	Pin
Masayoshi Motegi	8:50

== Participants ==
The tournament featured sixteen participants with most of the wrestlers primarily from the hosting promotion Michinoku Pro Wrestling. Most of the participants were new additions in the Super J-Cup while returning participants were the winner of the 1995 tournament Jushin Thunder Liger in his third consecutive Super J-Cup as well as 1994 quarter-finalist Ricky Fuji and runner-up The Great Sasuke returning to the tournament for their second Super J-Cup.

Name:	Promotion:	Championship held:
Cima	Toryumon	–
Curry Man	Michinoku Pro Wrestling	–
Gran Hamada	Michinoku Pro Wrestling	–
Judo Suwa	Toryumon	–
Jushin Liger	New Japan Pro-Wrestling	IWGP Junior Heavyweight Championship
Katsumi Usuda	Battlarts	–
Kaz Hayashi	World Championship Wrestling	–
Men's Teioh	Big Japan Pro Wrestling	–
Naoki Sano	Battlarts	–
Onryo	Wrestle Dream Factory	–
Ricky Fuji	Frontier Martial-Arts Wrestling	–
Ricky Marvin	Consejo Mundial de Lucha Libre	–
Sasuke the Great	Michinoku Pro Wrestling	–
Shinya Makabe	New Japan Pro-Wrestling	–
The Great Sasuke	Michinoku Pro Wrestling	NWA World Middleweight Championship
Tiger Mask	Michinoku Pro Wrestling	British Commonwealth Junior Heavyweight Championship

== April 1 ==
Super J-Cup: 3rd Stage (Day 1)
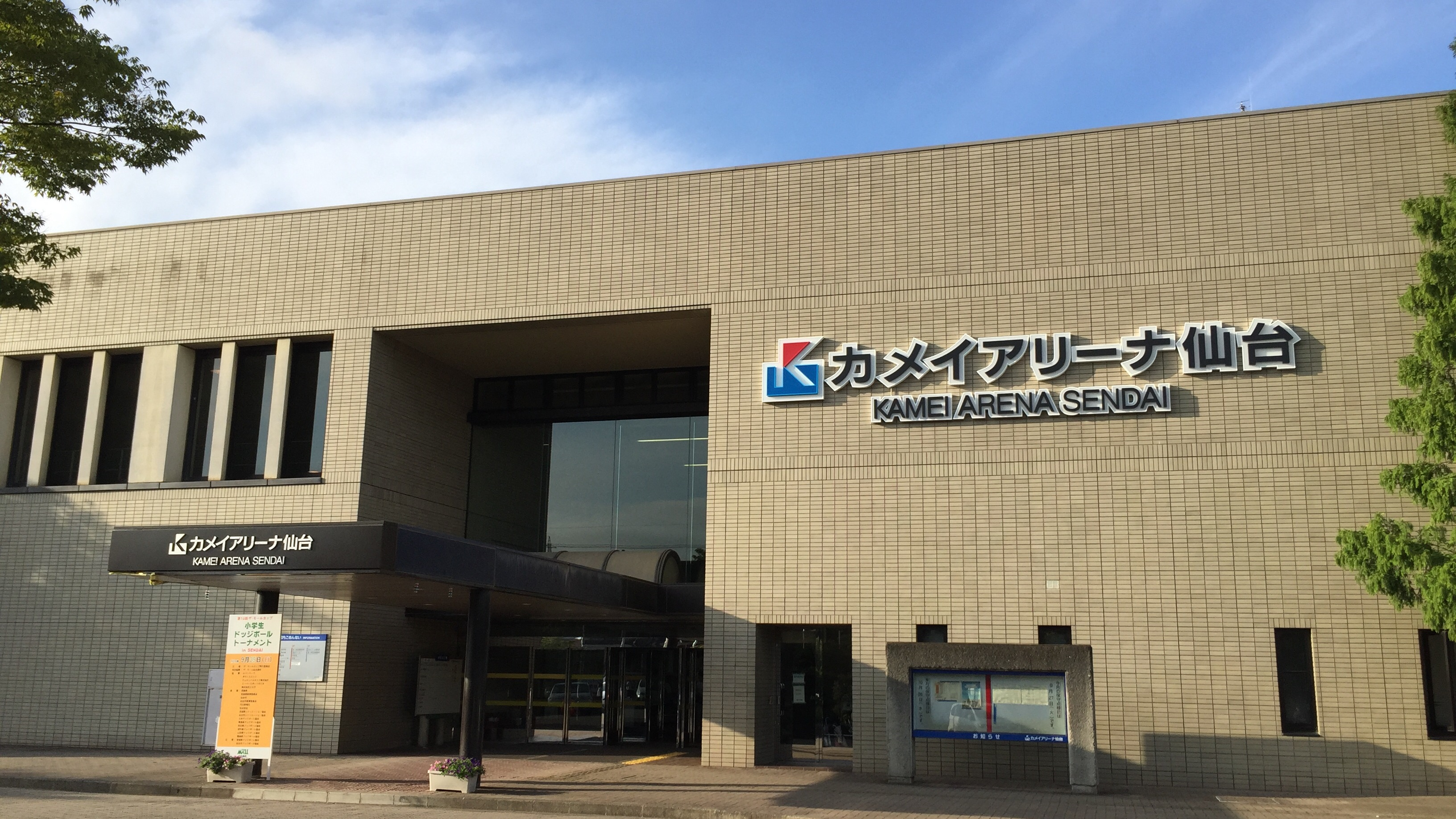
- Kamei Arena Sendai
- Promotion: Michinoku Pro Wrestling
- Date: April 1, 2000
- City: Sendai, Japan
- Venue: Kamei Arena Sendai
- Attendance: 4,159

Super J-Cup chronology
← Previous; Super J-Cup: 2nd Stage	Next → Super J-Cup: 3rd Stage (Day 2)

The first round of the tournament was held on April 1, 2000 at Kamei Arena Sendai in Sendai, Japan. Cima defeated the Mexican wrestler Ricky Marvin to kick off the tournament. The quarter-finalist of the 1994 Super J-Cup, Ricky Fuji returned to the tournament, making his second Super J-Cup appearance as he defeated Sasuke the Great by disqualification to advance to his second consecutive Super J-Cup quarter-final. In the following three matches, Naoki Sano defeated Judo Suwa, Men's Teioh defeated Katsumi Usuda and Onryo defeated Curry Man. The junior heavyweight legend Gran Hamada made his first Super J-Cup appearance by gaining a submission victory over Shinya Makabe. The 1994 runner-up The Great Sasuke competed in his second Super J-Cup by defeating Kaz Hayashi. In the final match of the first round, the 1995 winner Jushin Liger made his third consecutive Super J-Cup appearance, in which he defeated Tiger Mask.

No.	Results	Stipulations	Times
1	Cima defeated Ricky Marvin	2000 Super J-Cup tournament first round	5:41
2	Ricky Fuji defeated Sasuke the Great (with Ofune) by disqualification	2000 Super J-Cup tournament first round	4:48
3	Naoki Sano defeated Judo Suwa	2000 Super J-Cup tournament first round	7:28
4	Men's Teioh defeated Katsumi Usuda	2000 Super J-Cup tournament first round	9:36
5	Onryo defeated Curry Man	2000 Super J-Cup tournament first round	5:57
6	Gran Hamada defeated Shinya Makabe via submission	2000 Super J-Cup tournament first round	10:34
7	The Great Sasuke defeated Kaz Hayashi	2000 Super J-Cup tournament first round	9:39
8	Jushin Liger defeated Tiger Mask	2000 Super J-Cup tournament first round	12:13

== April 9 ==
Super J-Cup: 3rd Stage (Day 2)
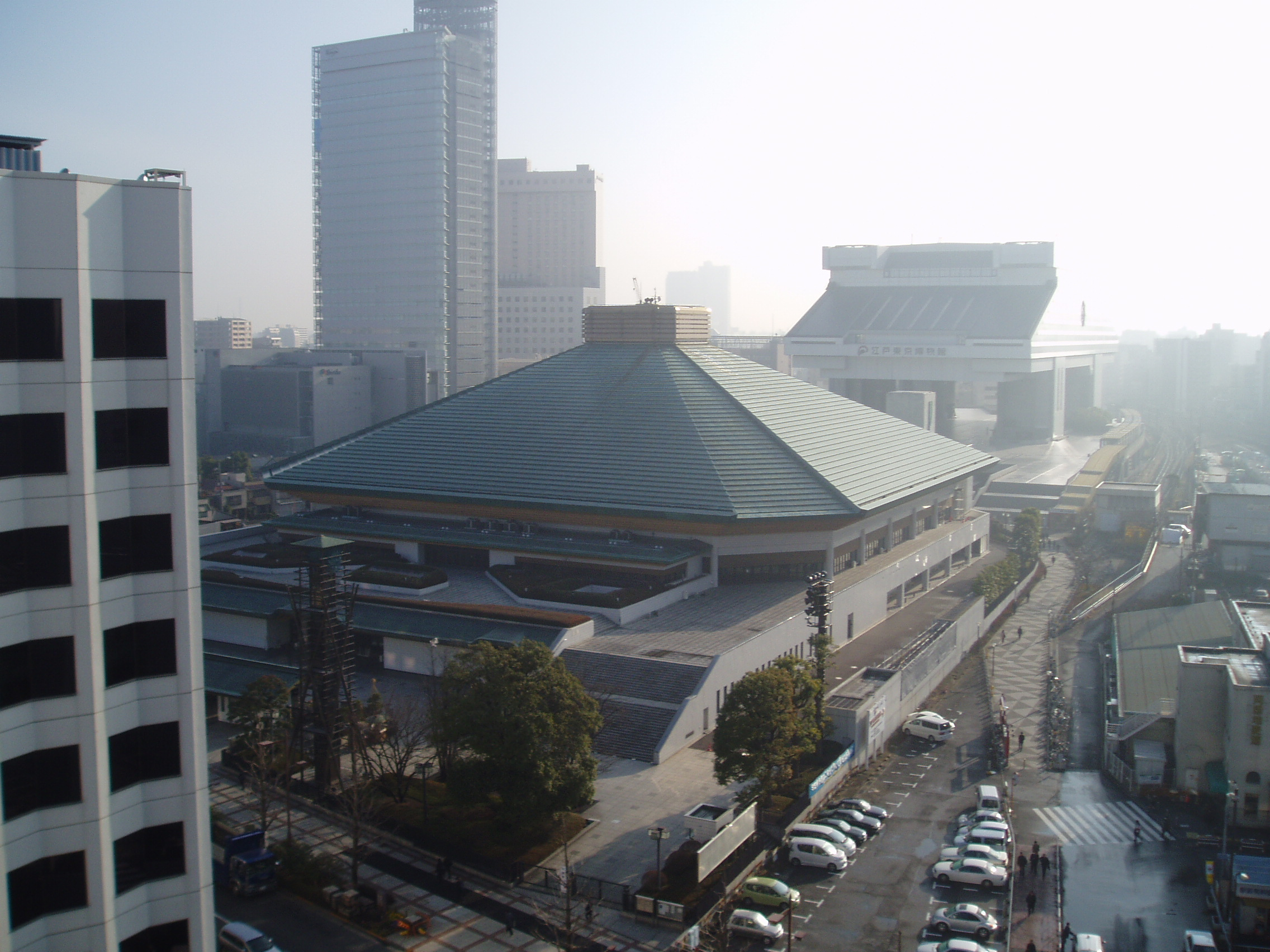
- Sumo Hall
- Promotion: Michinoku Pro Wrestling
- Date: April 9, 2000
- City: Tokyo, Japan
- Venue: Sumo Hall
- Attendance: 8,058

Super J-Cup chronology
← Previous; Super J-Cup: 3rd Stage (Day 1)	Next → Super J-Cup: 4th Stage

The final matches of the tournament were held on April 9, 2000 at the Sumo Hall in Tokyo, Japan, marking the return of the Super J-Cup to the Sumo Hall. The first match was a non-tournament special attraction match featuring luchadores in which Abismo Negro defeated El Oriental. The match was followed by quarter-final round of the Super J-Cup, which started with Cima beating Onryo and Gran Hamada defeating Ricky Fuji. Naoki Sano scored an upset by defeating The Great Sasuke via knockout. Jushin Liger defeated Men's Teioh in the last quarter-final match to qualify for the semi-final.

Next, was a women's match, in which Chaparita Asari successfully defended the WWWA Super Lightweight Championship against Hiromi Yagi, marking the first time that a joshi match was held at a Super J-Cup event and a championship was defended in the Super J-Cup. The title match was followed by the semi-final round, in which Jushin Liger defeated Gran Hamada and Cima defeated Naoki Sano to qualify for the final.

The semi-final round was followed by a refreshment ten-man tag team match, featuring several junior heavyweight wrestlers, including those who had been eliminated from the tournament in the first round on April 1. The team of Tiger Mask, Minoru Tanaka, 1995 Super J-Cup first round participant Masaaki Mochizuki, Shinya Makabe and Ricky Marvin defeated Kendo Kashin, El Samurai, Judo Suwa, Super Boy and Chabinger. This was followed by the tournament final, in which Jushin Thunder Liger defeated Cima to win the 2000 Super J-Cup, winning his second consecutive Super J-Cup tournament in the process.

No.	Results	Stipulations	Times
1	Abismo Negro defeated El Oriental	Singles match	7:13
2	Cima defeated Onryo	2000 Super J-Cup tournament quarter-final	4:22
3	Gran Hamada defeated Ricky Fuji	2000 Super J-Cup tournament quarter-final	7:34
4	Naoki Sano defeated The Great Sasuke via knockout	2000 Super J-Cup tournament quarter-final	10:36
5	Jushin Liger defeated Men's Teioh	2000 Super J-Cup tournament quarter-final	7:32
6	Chaparita Asari (c) defeated Hiromi Yagi	Singles match for the WWWA Super Lightweight Championship	9:13
7	Cima defeated Naoki Sano	2000 Super J-Cup tournament semi-final	12:52
8	Jushin Liger defeated Gran Hamada	2000 Super J-Cup tournament semi-final	10:02
9	Tiger Mask, Minoru Tanaka, Masaaki Mochizuki, Shinya Makabe and Ricky Marvin defeated Kendo Kashin, El Samurai, Judo Suwa, Super Boy and Chabinger	Ten-man tag team match	17:18
10	Jushin Liger defeated Cima	2000 Super J-Cup tournament final	12:28
(c) / – the champion(s) heading into the match

== Tournament brackets ==
Round 1
Cima	Pin
Ricky Marvin	5:41
Curry Man	Pin
Onryo	5:57
Naoki Sano	Pin
Judo Suwa	7:28
The Great Sasuke	Pin
Kaz Hayashi	9:39
Jushin Thunder Liger	Pin
Tiger Mask IV	12:13
Katsumi Usuda	Pin
Men's Teioh	9:36
Gran Hamada	Sub
Shinya Makabe	10:34
Sasuke the Great	DQ
Ricky Fuji	4:48

Quarterfinals
Cima	Pin
Onryo	4:22
Naoki Sano	KO
The Great Sasuke	10:36
Jushin Thunder Liger	Pin
Men's Teioh	7:32
Gran Hamada	Pin
Ricky Fuji	7:34

Semifinals
Cima	Pin
Naoki Sano	12:52
Jushin Thunder Liger	Pin
Gran Hamada	10:02

Final
Cima	Pin
Jushin Thunder Liger	12:28

== Reception ==
The Super J-Cup: 3rd Stage was not as successful as the previous two editions of the event. The second night of the event which was held at the Sumo Hall, the venue of the first two Super J-Cup tournaments, failed to draw a large crowd just like the previous two editions. According to Paul Cooke of Cross Arm Breaker, Michinoku Pro Wrestling had lost much of its momentum and fanbase in puroresu which it had gained during the mid-1990s and was unable to gain the same fanbase which New Japan Pro-Wrestling was able to build around. The failure to obtain famous competitors for this tournament has also been cited as the reason for lack of audience. The actual crowd number of the final round is disputed. According to some sources, a crowd drew of 7,000, while most of the sources state that the event was able to draw a crowd of over 8,000 people.

According to Cooke, the Super J-Cup: 3rd Stage was "a fun, watchable tournament from start to finish with a fascinating cast of wrestlers." While comparing to the 1994 and 1995 editions of the Super J-Cup: 3rd Stage, Cooke stated "From a pure match quality perspective, Super J-Cup Stage 3 does not match up to the original. It also probably is not as far away as many felt at the time. If we are taking non-tournament matches out of the equation, the 2000 version feels comparable to the 1995 one. There are no matches to go out of your way worth seeing, but there are few stinkers and a lot of watchable ones as well." He further added that Super J-Cup was "ultimately a solid, top-to-bottom junior heavyweight wrestling tournament that fans of the 1990s junior style will likely enjoy for both match quality and for a chance to see a motley crew of wrestlers in one place at differing stages of their careers. It is not an all-time great, but rather a fun tournament that shouldn’t be skipped over if you are a fan of the junior heavyweight style."
