= Super J-Cup (2020) =

Wrestling tournament

Super J-Cup: 8th Stage
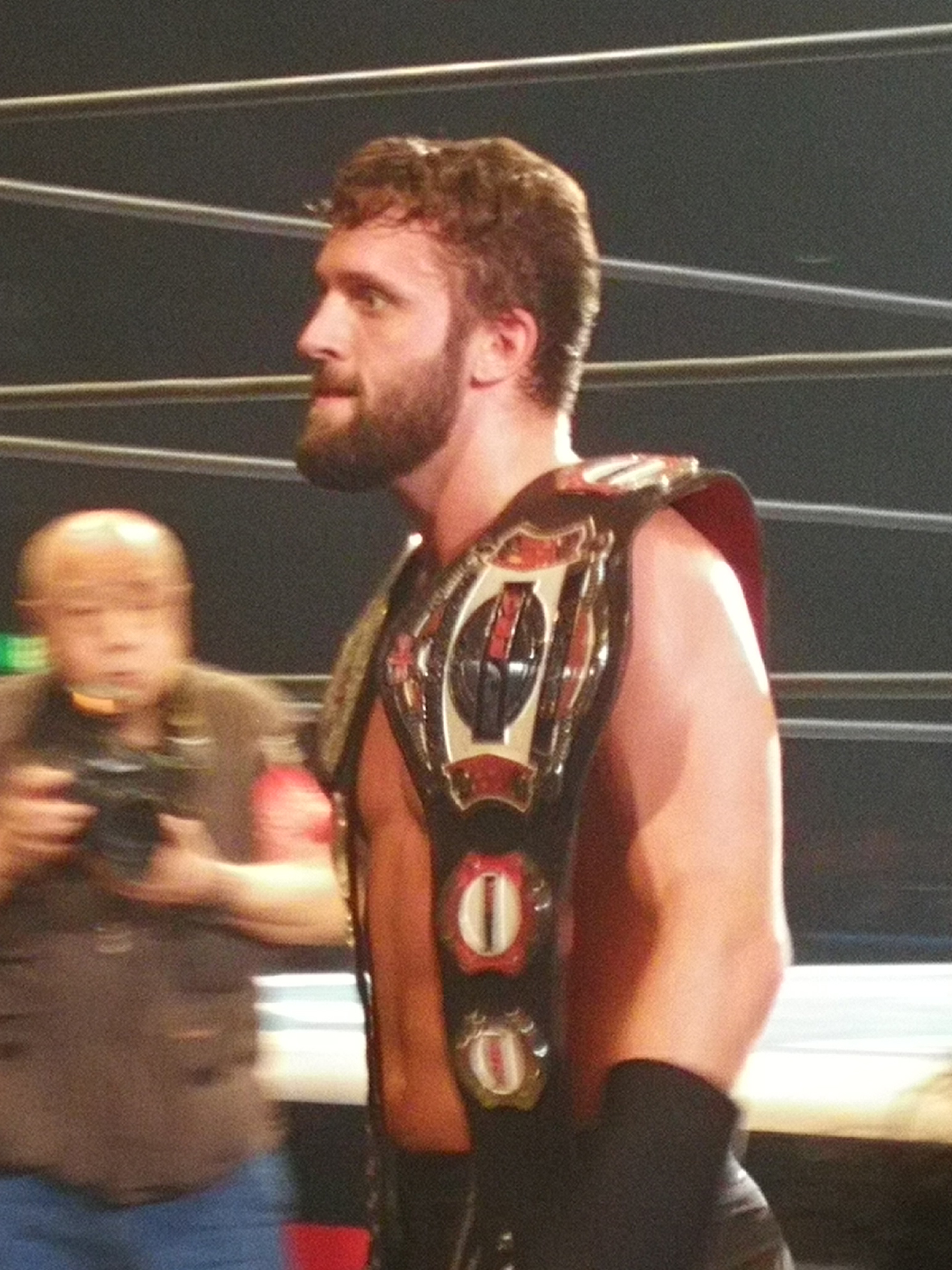
- Tournament winner El Phantasmo
- Venue: Oceanview Pavilion
- Location: Port Hueneme, California
- Date: December 12, 2020

Champion
- El Phantasmo

Super J-Cup 2020 was the eighth Super J-Cup professional wrestling single-elimination tournament produced by New Japan Pro-Wrestling (NJPW). It was a one-night event, taking place on December 12, 2020. The tournament featured inter-promotional matches between junior heavyweight wrestlers from various wrestling promotions.

== Background ==
During the Road to Power Struggle show on November 2, 2020, NJPW announced that the Super J-Cup would return on December 12, and will take place entirely in the United States. Including 2019's Super J-Cup, this was the first time that the tournament is held in back-to-back years since 1994 and 1995.

Karl Fredericks was originally scheduled to team with Ren Narita to face Hikuleo and Kenta of Bullet Club, but it was announced on December 12 that Fredericks sustained an unknown injury. Kevin Knight was announced as his replacement.

== Participants ==
The tournament featured 8 junior heavyweight wrestlers from various wrestling promotions.

Name	Promotion	Group
El Phantasmo	New Japan Pro-Wrestling	Bullet Club
Clark Connors	New Japan Pro-Wrestling	LA Dojo
TJP	Impact Wrestling	
A. C. H.	Major League Wrestling	
Blake Christian	Game Changer Wrestling	
Chris Bey	Impact Wrestling; United Wrestling Network	
Rey Horus	Ring of Honor	
Lio Rush	Major League Wrestling	

== Results ==
No.	Results	Stipulations	Times
1	Chris Bey defeated Clark Connors	2020 Super J-Cup tournament first round	9:36
2	A. C. H. defeated TJP	2020 Super J-Cup tournament first round	9:52
3	Blake Christian defeated Rey Horus	2020 Super J-Cup tournament first round	12:00
4	El Phantasmo defeated Lio Rush	2020 Super J-Cup tournament first round	15:36
5	Team Filthy (Danny Limelight and J. R. Kratos) defeated Fred Rosser and Rocky Romero	Tag team match	12:49
6	A. C. H. defeated Chris Bey	2020 Super J-Cup tournament semi-final	8:26
7	El Phantasmo defeated Blake Christian	2020 Super J-Cup tournament semi-final	7:24
8	Bullet Club (Hikuleo and Kenta) defeated Ren Narita and Kevin Knight	Tag team match	10:02
9	El Phantasmo defeated A. C. H.	2020 Super J-Cup tournament final	16:11

=== Tournament brackets ===
Round 1
Clark Connors	9:36
Chris Bey	Pin
A. C. H.	Pin
TJP	9:52
Rey Horus	12:00
Blake Christian	Pin
El Phantasmo	Pin
Lio Rush	15:36

Semifinals
Chris Bey	8:26
ACH	Pin
Blake Christian	7:24
El Phantasmo	Pin

Final
ACH	16:11
El Phantasmo	Pin
