= Super J-Cup (1995) =

Super J-Cup: 2nd Stage
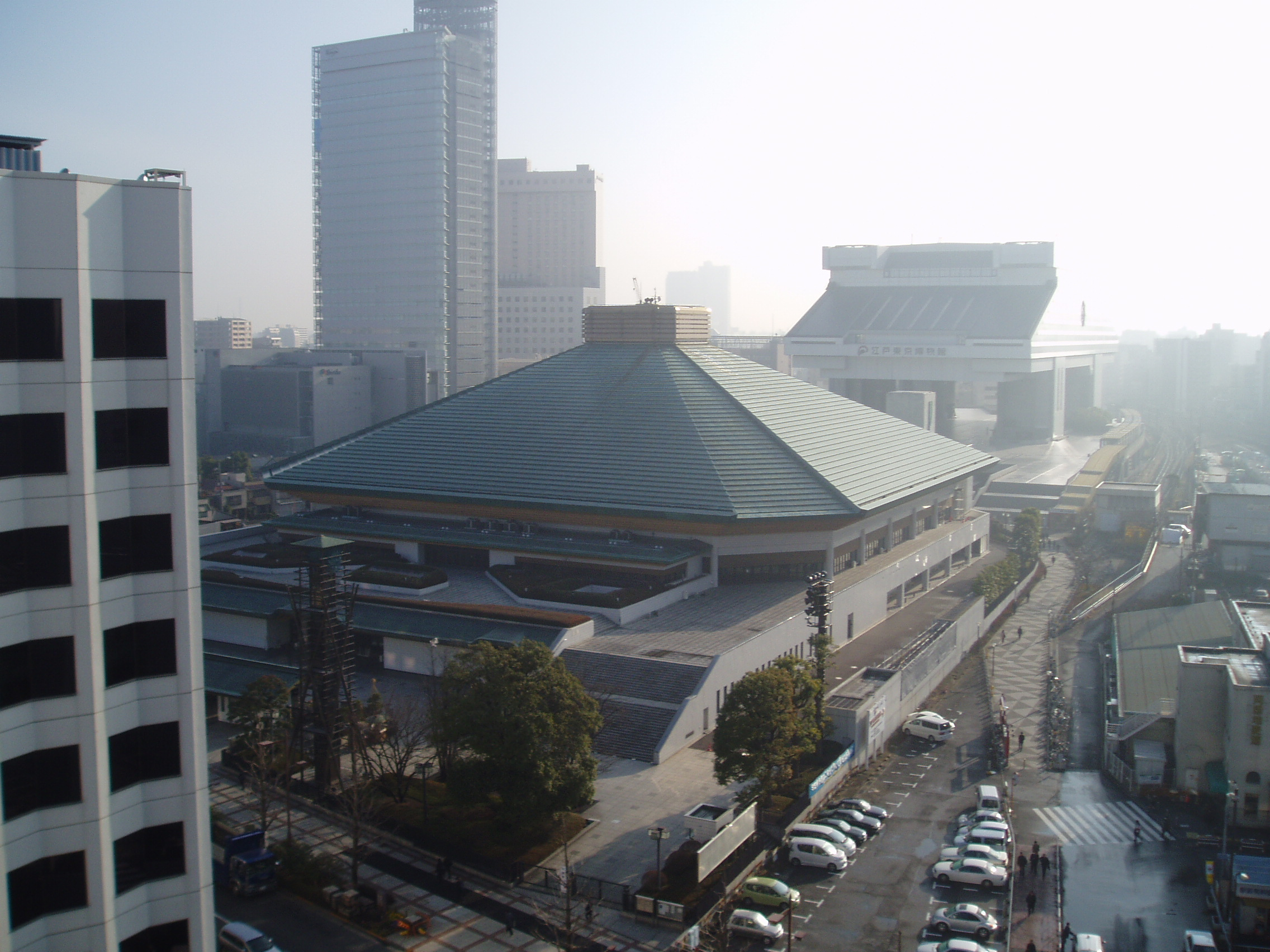
- Sumo Hall
- Promotion: Wrestle Association R
- Date: December 13, 1995
- City: Tokyo, Japan
- Venue: Sumo Hall
- Attendance: 11,500

Super J-Cup chronology
← Previous; Super J-Cup: 1st Stage	Next → Super J-Cup: 3rd Stage

Super J-Cup: 2nd Stage was the second Super J-Cup professional wrestling tournament, it was hosted by Wrestle Association R and produced by WAR wrestler Último Dragón. The tournament was held to determine the top junior heavyweight of the world for that year. The event took place on December 13, 1995, at the Sumo Hall in Tokyo, Japan. Like the previous year, the 1995 event brought in wrestlers from the promotions from all over the world including previous year's host New Japan Pro-Wrestling (NJPW), Consejo Mundial de Lucha Libre (CMLL), Lucha Libre AAA Worldwide (AAA), Social Progressive Wrestling Federation (SPWF), Wrestle Association R (WAR) and Extreme Championship Wrestling (ECW).

Similar to the previous year, the tournament featured fourteen participants. The main event was the final round of the 1995 Super J-Cup tournament, in which Jushin Thunder Liger defeated Gedo to win the tournament. Aside from the tournament, the event also featured a "special attraction" match between Rey Misterio, Jr. and Psicosis.

== Background ==
The concept of featuring the world's best junior heavyweights was conceived by Jushin Thunder Liger, leading to New Japan Pro-Wrestling producing the Super J-Cup in 1994 and bringing the best junior heavyweight wrestlers from various Japanese promotions as well as from United States, Canada and Mexico as well. The event held at the Sumo Hall in Tokyo, Japan was a huge success as the Sumo Hall was sold out with a crowd of 11,500. The event was a critical and commercial success and received favourable reviews from all the critics. The event also allowed many participants, including Jushin Thunder Liger, The Great Sasuke, Gedo and Wild Pegasus, to make a name for themselves and showcase their talents on a national level. Dave Meltzer of Wrestling Observer Newsletter rated the tournament final between Pegasus and Sasuke, a five-star match. Although initially conceived as a one-time only event, the success of the 1994 Super J-Cup led NJPW to collaborate with Wrestle Association R to hold the event again and bring in some new junior heavyweights while also bringing some of the previous year's participants. WAR hosted the event at the previous year's venue Sumo Hall and Último Dragón produced the event while also participating in it.

Famous luchadores Rey Misterio, Jr. and Psicosis were also brought in at the event to participate in a non-tournament "special attraction" match as a breather for the finalists, allowing them to take rest before the tournament final.

== Participants ==
Many participants from the previous year including Jushin Thunder Liger, Gedo, Shinjiro Otani, Masayoshi Motegi, Shinjiro Otani, El Samurai and previous year's winner Wild Pegasus returned from the previous year to participate while new additions were Damián 666, Dos Caras, Gran Naniwa, Hanzo Nakajima, Shoichi Funaki, Masaaki Mochizuki and Último Dragón.

Name:	Promotion:	Championship held:
Damián 666	Frontier Martial-Arts Wrestling	–
Dos Caras	Consejo Mundial de Lucha Libre	–
El Samurai	New Japan Pro-Wrestling	–
Gedo	Wrestle Association R	–
Gran Naniwa	Michinoku Pro Wrestling	–
Hanzo Nakajima	Michinoku Pro Wrestling	–
Jushin Thunder Liger	New Japan Pro-Wrestling	–
Lionheart	Wrestle Association R	–
Masaaki Mochizuki	Wrestle Association R	–
Masayoshi Motegi	Social Progress Wrestling Federation	NWA World Junior Heavyweight Championship
Shinjiro Otani	New Japan Pro-Wrestling	–
Shoichi Funaki	Michinoku Pro Wrestling	–
Último Dragón	Wrestle Association R	NWA World Middleweight Championship; WAR International Junior Heavyweight Championship
Wild Pegasus	New Japan Pro-Wrestling	–

== Event ==
=== First round ===
Jushin Thunder Liger and previous year's winner Wild Pegasus received byes in the first round. The first match in the tournament featured Gran Naniwa against Damián 666. During the match, Damián paid tribute to both Mitsuharu Misawa and The Great Muta respectively by shouting their names before hitting Misawa's Misawa Elbow Strike and Muta's Moonsault respectively. Naniwa won by rolling out of Damián's Moonsault attempt and quickly executing a Frankensteiner on Damián.

Next, Shinjiro Otani participated in his second Super J-Cup against Masaaki Mochizuki. After a back and forth action, Otani hit a missile dropkick to Mochizuki's knee and applied a kneebar on Mochizuki, forcing him to tap out the hold.

Último Dragón took on Shoichi Funaki in the following match. Funaki dominated the earlier part of the match until both men exchanged moves. Near the end of the match, Funaki hit a fisherman suplex on Dragon for a near-fall and then whipped him in the corner but Dragon made a comeback by hitting a fisherman suplex to Funaki. He then hit a lariat to Funaki in the corner and then hit him a Frankensteiner from the top rope and a DDT followed by a Moonsault and then pinned him with a La Magistral.

Previous year's semifinalist Gedo returned to compete against Masayoshi Motegi. In the earlier portion of the match, Motegi dropkicked Gedo out of the ring and began working on his arm to gain momentum. Near the end of the match, Gedo made a comeback by avoiding a diving headbutt by Motegi and then Gedo blocked a headscissors attempt by Motegi and applied a bridging double chickenwing on Motegi, forcing him to tap out to the hold.

El Samurai returned for his second consecutive Super J-Cup against Dos Caras. Caras applied many submission holds against Samurai throughout the match. Samurai ultimately gained momentum by hitting a Samurai Bomb for a near-fall. Samurai then whipped Caras into the corner and hit a dropkick and then executed a Frankensteiner on Caras from the top rope. Caras avoided a diving headbutt by Samurai and then Caras hit a diving crossbody to Samurai to advance to the quarter-final.

In the last match of the first round, Lionheart competed against Hanzo Nakajima. After a back and forth action, Lionheart hit a fisherman suplex and a Lionsault to advance to the quarter-final.

=== Quarterfinals ===
Jushin Thunder Liger competed in his first tournament match against Gran Naniwa after having a bye in the first round. After a back and forth action, Liger attempted to execute a Liger Bomb but Naniwa countered the move with a Hurricanrana for a near-fall. Liger got up and hit a fisherman buster to win the match.

Later, Shinjiro Otani took on Último Dragón. Otani gained the momentum by hitting aerial moves on Dragon outside the ring until Dragon hit an Asai Moonsault and then the action returned to the ring. After a back and forth action between the two, Dragon hit a Cancún Tornado and pinned Otani with a La Magistral to advance to the semi-final.

Next, Dos Caras took on Gedo in the third quarter-final match of the night. Caras applied his various submission moves on Gedo to gain control of the match. After controlling most of the match, Caras delivered a diving crossbody to Gedo for a near-fall. Caras then placed him in the corner and hit him some mounted punches until Gedo hit a low blow to Caras and pinned him with a Gedo Clutch for the victory.

The last quarter-final match pitted Lionheart against Wild Pegasus, who received a bye in the first round. The two traded moves and exchanged momentum throughout the match until Pegasus won the match by pinning him after a kneeling reverse piledriver from the top rope.

=== Semifinals ===
Jushin Liger and Último Dragón competed in the first semi-final match of the tournament. Dragon targeted Liger's leg and used several moves to injure it and control him for most of the match. Dragon tried to win the match by performing a Cancún Tornado on Liger but Liger moved out of the way and then he executed a Ligerbomb and covered him for the pinfall but got a near-fall as Dragon kicked out at 2 count. Liger climbed the top rope but Dragon tripped him on the ropes and Liger fell down on the mat where Dragon rolled him for a La Magistral but Liger then rolled him up and won the match.

Gedo and Wild Pegasus competed in the second semi-final match. After a back and forth action, Pegasus tried to win the match by attempting a diving headbutt on Gedo but missed it as Gedo moved out of the way and both men were knocked down on the mat. Pegasus got up and tried to hit a Powerbomb but Gedo countered it into a Hurricanrana. Pegasus attempted to hit a suplex but Gedo countered with a Brainbuster followed by a diving headbutt to advance to the final round.

Next, was a non-tournament special refresher match between Rey Misterio, Jr. and Psicosis. After trading moves back and forth, Misterio won the match by hitting two hurricanranas to Psicosis.

=== Final ===
Jushin Liger took on Gedo in the final round of the 1995 Super J-Cup. After back and forth action, Liger hit a fisherman buster from the top rope to Gedo to win the tournament.

== Reception ==
Super J-Cup: 2nd Stage was a very successful event and managed to draw a crowd of 11,500 people at Sumo Hall, similar to the previous year's number. The show received critical acclaim but was not considered equivalent to the Super J-Cup: 1st Stage. However, Gedo's subsequent push to the final round and Gedo himself as a worker was not appreciated, which was considered by many critics, a major drawback for the event. Austin Skinner of Wrestling Recaps compared the previous year's tournament to be better than it but appreciated the event in its own right by stating "The whole thing is worth watching through at least once and if given the chance to do so, I highly suggest it to any fan of the first event. Even if you’ve never watched a Japanese wrestling event, I still suggest you give it a try" with "the matches themselves are worth it. If you only watch one match from this event, I suggest the either the Shinjiro Otani/Ultimo Dragon match or the Ultimo Dragon/Jushin Liger match, they are both just ridiculously good matches. The lack of suck names as The Great Sasuke and Super Delfin were made up by such names as Lionheart and Dos Caras this time around. The talent was there and the matches were pretty good. Unfortunately I think this tournament suffers from the sequel stigma. Either way you look at this event, the bracket was great and matches lived up to expectations."

Kevin Wilson of Puroresu Central considered the quarter-final match of Jushin Liger and Gran Naniwa to be the best match of the show and Liger as the most valuable player of the event. He stated "it was a real test for the wrestlers to keep the crowd into it and also a test to their stamina and conditioning. The 1995 version of Gedo didn't help overall, I know it is the common complaint about this tournament but there is a good reason, he wasn't a bad wrestler but with a line-up like this tournament having him be the only one with four matches was going to effect the overall quality. Still a great tournament, and highly recommended."

According to Scott Keith of 411Mania, the 1995 Super J-Cup was "a very fun show with some AWESOME wrestling" and "a definite recommendation", while criticizing Gedo's subsequent push as the runner-up of the tournament.

TJ Hawke of 411Mania rated it an average event and gave it a score of 6 by reporting "Oddly enough, a show built around Gedo instead of The Great Sasuke and Wild Pegasus didn't make for a great sequel! Seriously, Gedo really destroys any chance this tournament had to living up to the original. There's nothing in this tournament that you really need to go out of your way to see, but it's still decently entertaining all the way through."

Jake Metcalfe of 411Mania appreciated the event, calling it his "favorite show of all time" with "Five matches over 80% and a large portion of the rest all well above average… you can’t really turn your nose up at ratings like that. The thing with this tournament, and the thing that really takes it a notch up from the 1994 Super J Cup is the variety of the matches. My main problem with the 1994 J Cup is the fact that virtually all the matches follow a similar formula on that tape, but here, with a more free style of booking and more diverse base of talent, each match has just enough of a different theme to make them all worthwhile."

According to Paul Cooke of Cross Arm Breaker, "1995 Super J Cup was a step down from the original, but still well received for matches like Ultimo Dragon vs. Shinjiro Otani and Ultimo Dragon vs. Jushin Liger. A non-tournament exhibition between Rey Mysterio, Jr. and Psicosis was labeled the show-stealer at the time."

== Results ==
No.	Results	Stipulations	Times
1	Gran Naniwa defeated Damián 666	1995 Super J-Cup tournament first round	6:36
2	Shinjiro Otani defeated Masaaki Mochizuki via submission	1995 Super J-Cup tournament first round	4:00
3	Último Dragón defeated Shoichi Funaki	1995 Super J-Cup tournament first round	6:52
4	Gedo defeated Masayoshi Motegi via submission	1995 Super J-Cup tournament first round	6:56
5	Dos Caras defeated El Samurai	1995 Super J-Cup tournament first round	7:00
6	Lionheart defeated Hanzo Nakajima	1995 Super J-Cup tournament first round	6:48
7	Jushin Liger defeated Gran Naniwa	1995 Super J-Cup tournament quarter-final	9:13
8	Último Dragón defeated Shinjiro Otani	1995 Super J-Cup tournament quarter-final	13:30
9	Gedo defeated Dos Caras	1995 Super J-Cup tournament quarter-final	8:54
10	Wild Pegasus defeated Lionheart	1995 Super J-Cup tournament quarter-final	13:43
11	Jushin Liger defeated Último Dragón	1995 Super J-Cup tournament semi-final	17:19
12	Gedo defeated Wild Pegasus	1995 Super J-Cup tournament semi-final	9:20
13	Rey Misterio Jr. defeated Psicosis	Singles match	9:39
14	Jushin Liger defeated Gedo	1995 Super J-Cup tournament final	15:47

=== Tournament bracket ===
Round 1
Damián 666	6:36
Gran Naniwa	Pin
Shinjiro Otani	Sub
Masaaki Mochizuki	4:02
Shoichi Funaki	6:52
Último Dragón	Pin
Gedo	Sub
Masayoshi Motegi	6:56
Dos Caras	Pin
El Samurai	7:00
Lionheart	Pin
Hanzo Nakajima	6:48

Quarterfinals
Jushin Thunder Liger	Pin
Gran Naniwa	9:13
Shinjiro Otani	13:30
Último Dragón	Pin
Gedo	Pin
Dos Caras	8:54
Lionheart	13:43
Wild Pegasus	Pin

Semifinals
Jushin Thunder Liger	Pin
Último Dragón	17:19
Gedo	Pin
Wild Pegasus	9:20

Final
Jushin Thunder Liger	Pin
Gedo	15:47
