= Super J-Cup =

Wrestling tournament

- Created by: Jushin Liger
- Promotions: NJPW (1994, 2009, 2016, 2019, 2020); WAR (1995); MPW (2000); OPW (2004)
- Nicknames: Land of Confusion (2009)
- First event: Super J-Cup: 1st Stage
- Last event: Super J-Cup: 8th Stage
- Event gimmick: Single elimination tournament for junior heavyweight wrestlers

The Super J-Cup is a periodically held professional wrestling tournament featuring junior heavyweight wrestlers from all over the world promoted by New Japan Pro-Wrestling (NJPW). This tournament differs from NJPW's annual Best of the Super Juniors tournament in that it is single elimination, while Best of the Super Juniors has a round robin format.

The Super J-Cup was originally conceived by Japanese wrestler Jushin Thunder Liger as a showcase for promotions from Asia and North America, including Liger's home promotion New Japan Pro-Wrestling (who hosted the first tournament in 1994), Frontier Martial-Arts Wrestling, Wrestle Association R, Michinoku Pro Wrestling, Consejo Mundial de Lucha Libre, and the Social Progress Wrestling Federation. In the following years, wrestlers representing various other NJPW partner promotions would also participate.

Since the original Super J-Cup in 1994, the tournament has taken place sporadically (1995, 2000, 2004, 2009, 2016, 2019, and 2020). The original is widely regarded as one of the greatest professional wrestling shows of all time. Dave Meltzer, editor of the Wrestling Observer Newsletter, called the 1994 Super J-Cup "the most incredible single night of wrestling ever".

== Dates, venues and winners ==
Event	Host promotion	Winner	Times won	Date(s)	Runner-up	City	Venue	Main event	Ref.
Super J-Cup: 1st Stage	New Japan Pro-Wrestling	Wild Pegasus	1	April 16, 1994	The Great Sasuke	Tokyo, Japan	Ryōgoku Kokugikan	The Great Sasuke vs. Wild Pegasus in the 1994 Super J-Cup final	
Super J-Cup: 2nd Stage	Wrestle Association R	Jushin Liger	1	December 13, 1995	Gedo	Tokyo, Japan	Ryōgoku Kokugikan	Jushin Liger vs. Gedo in the 1995 Super J-Cup final	
Super J-Cup: 3rd Stage	Michinoku Pro Wrestling	Jushin Liger	2	April 1, 2000	Cima	Sendai, Japan	Sendai City Gymnasium	Jushin Liger vs. Tiger Mask in the 2000 Super J-Cup first round	
Super J-Cup: 3rd Stage	Michinoku Pro Wrestling	Jushin Liger	2	April 9, 2000	Cima	Tokyo, Japan	Ryōgoku Kokugikan	Cima vs. Jushin Liger in the 2000 Super J-Cup final	
Super J-Cup: 4th Stage	Osaka Pro Wrestling	Naomichi Marufuji	1	February 21, 2004	Takehiro Murahama	Osaka, Japan	Osaka-jō Hall	Naomichi Marufuji vs. Takehiro Murahama in the 2004 Super J-Cup final	
Super J-Cup: 5th Stage	New Japan Pro-Wrestling	Naomichi Marufuji	2	December 22, 2009	Prince Devitt	Tokyo, Japan	Korakuen Hall	Jushin Liger vs. Naomichi Marufuji in the 2009 Super J-Cup first round	
Super J-Cup: 5th Stage	New Japan Pro-Wrestling	Naomichi Marufuji	2	December 23, 2009	Prince Devitt	Tokyo, Japan	Korakuen Hall	Naomichi Marufuji vs. Prince Devitt in the 2009 Super J-Cup final	
Super J-Cup: 6th Stage	New Japan Pro-Wrestling	Kushida	1	July 20, 2016	Yoshinobu Kanemaru	Tokyo, Japan	Korakuen Hall	Kushida vs. Taiji Ishimori in the 2016 Super J-Cup first round	
Super J-Cup: 6th Stage	New Japan Pro-Wrestling	Kushida	1	August 21, 2016	Yoshinobu Kanemaru	Tokyo, Japan	Ariake Coliseum	Kushida vs. Yoshinobu Kanemaru in the 2016 Super J-Cup final	
Super J-Cup: 7th Stage	New Japan Pro-Wrestling	El Phantasmo	1	August 22, 2019	Dragon Lee	Tacoma, Washington	Masonic Temple Building-Temple Theater	Amazing Red vs. Will Ospreay in the 2019 Super J-Cup first round	
Super J-Cup: 7th Stage	New Japan Pro-Wrestling	El Phantasmo	1	August 24, 2019	Dragon Lee	San Francisco, California	San Francisco State University Student Life Events Center	Sho vs. Will Ospreay in the 2019 Super J-Cup quarter-final round	
Super J-Cup: 7th Stage	New Japan Pro-Wrestling	El Phantasmo	1	August 25, 2019	Dragon Lee	Long Beach, California	Walter Pyramid	Dragon Lee vs. El Phantasmo in the 2019 Super J-Cup final	
Super J-Cup: 8th Stage	New Japan Pro-Wrestling	El Phantasmo	2	December 12, 2020	A. C. H.	Port Hueneme, California	Oceanview Pavilion	A. C. H. vs. El Phantasmo in the 2020 Super J-Cup final	

== Legacy ==
The popularity and success of Super J-Cup has led various promotions to create J-Cup tournaments showcasing junior heavyweight wrestlers. Some of their examples include Revolution Pro Wrestling's British J-Cup, Jersey Championship Wrestling's Jersey J-Cup and the J-Cup Tournament.

== See also ==
- Puroresu
- New Japan Pro-Wrestling
- Wrestle Association R
- Michinoku Pro Wrestling
- Osaka Pro Wrestling
- J-Cup Tournament
- Jersey J-Cup
