= Masayoshi Motegi =

Japanese professional wrestler

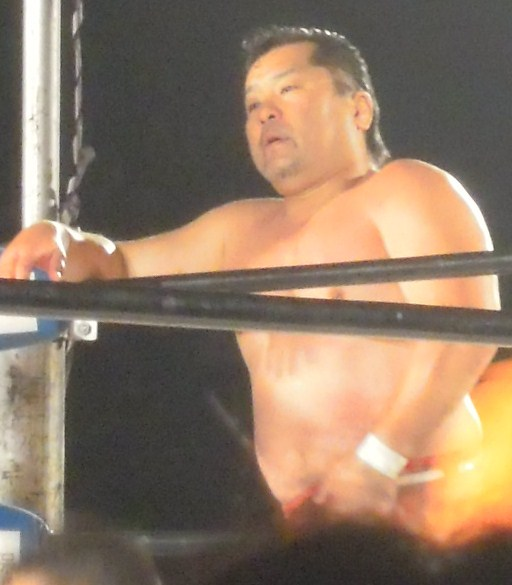
- Motegi at a Big Japan Pro Wrestling show in May 2010

Personal information
- Born: November 24, 1962 (age 63) Tokyo, Japan

Professional wrestling career
- Ring name(s): Masayoshi Motegi; Chabinger; BENTEN
- Billed height: 1.76 m (5 ft 9 in)
- Billed weight: 91 kg (201 lb)
- Debut: September 20, 1991
- Retired: August 7, 2018

Masayoshi Motegi (茂木正淑, Motegi Masayoshi; born November 24, 1962) is a Japanese retired professional wrestler. He is known for his background in karate and the innovation of the Rolling German suplex. He also has been a staple of Big Japan Pro Wrestling, IWA Japan and W*ING as well as Japanese independent promotions such as the Social Progressive Wrestling Federation (SPWF).

== Career ==
Motegi made his debut in 1991 and within two years he defeated Ray Gonzalez for the W*ING Junior Heavyweight Championship on January 7, 1993. During early August 1993, Motegi toured the United States with W*ING Tag Team Champions The Headhunters defending his (WWC version) W*ING Junior Heavyweight title in Eastern Championship Wrestling defeating Don E. Allen at the ECW Arena in Philadelphia, Pennsylvania on August 7, 1993. The following night, he fought J.T. Smith to a time limit draw.

He would win the title three more times from Hiroshi Itakura, El Texano and Shinichi Nakano respectively and remained champion until the promotions close on March 13, 1994.

The following year, Motegi entered the 1995 Super J-Cup, losing to Gedo in the opening rounds.

In June 1996, during a match against Héctor Garza in Tokyo, Japan, Motegi won the UWA World Middleweight Championship after knocking out Garza however he immediately vacated the title soon after. The following month, he participated in the first J-Crown Tournament held by New Japan Pro-Wrestling to unify the eight existing World Junior Heavyweight Championship titles defended in Japan. Representing Wrestle Dream Factory, he defended his NWA World Junior Heavyweight Championship and lost to IWGP Junior Heavyweight Champion The Great Sasuke in the opening rounds at Sumo Hall in Tokyo on August 2.

Two years later, he defeated Abdullah Kobayashi in a 7-man round robin championship tournament to win the BJW World Junior Heavyweight Championship in Numazu, Japan on June 30, 1999. Eventually losing the title to Fantastik in Hakodate, Japan on November 6, he regained the title from Fantastik the following month as Chabinger, before losing the title to Men's Teoh in Fukushima, Japan on June 21, 2000.

He later defeated Toshiyuki Moriya for the IWA (Kakuto Shijuku) World Middleweight Championship in Kanazawa, Japan on December 2, 2001. Although the title was vacated the following day, Motegi regained the title a week later after winning a one-day 4-man championship tournament defeating Koji Isinriki in the finals on December 16. The following year in Sapporo, Japan, he defeated The Great Takeru and Yukihide Ueno in a 3-way match to become the first IWA (Japan) World Junior Heavyweight Champion on August 3, 2002.

Motegi retired on August 7, 2018.

== Championships and accomplishments ==
- Big Japan Pro Wrestling

- BJW World Junior Heavyweight Championship (2 times)

- IWA Japan

- IWA World Junior Heavyweight Championship (1 time)

- IWA Kakutou Shijuku

- IWA World Middleweight Championship (2 times)

- National Wrestling Alliance

- NWA World Junior Heavyweight Championship (1 time)

- Universal Wrestling Association

- UWA World Middleweight Championship (1 time)

- Wrestling International New Generations

- W*ING/WWC Junior Heavyweight Championship (4 times)
