= Super J-Cup: 1st Stage =

Professional wrestling tournament

- WWWF Junior Heavyweight Championship belt was used as a trophy for the tournament.
- Promotion: New Japan Pro-Wrestling
- Date: April 16, 1994
- City: Tokyo, Japan
- Venue: Sumo Hall
- Attendance: 11,500

Super J-Cup chronology
← Previous; First	Next → Super J-Cup: 2nd Stage

Super J-Cup: 1st Stage was the first Super J-Cup professional wrestling tournament hosted by New Japan Pro-Wrestling (NJPW). The event took place on April 16, 1994, at Sumo Hall in Tokyo, Japan. The tournament featured fourteen junior heavyweight wrestlers and was created by Jushin Thunder Liger and was the first NJPW event to feature only junior heavyweight wrestlers. The event received critical acclaim and commercial success, leading to Japanese promotions hosting more editions of the tournament, leading to the event being renamed the Super J-Cup: 1st Stage in later years.

Wild Pegasus won the inaugural Super J-Cup by defeating The Great Sasuke in the final round and was awarded the WWWF Junior Heavyweight Championship belt as a trophy for winning the tournament. The tournament was a financial success as it drew a crowd of 11,000 fans and paved the way for NJPW to hold more junior heavyweight-exclusive events in the future. Dave Meltzer of Wrestling Observer Newsletter called it "the most incredible single night of wrestling ever" and named this the best major wrestling event in 1994, due to its meaning to the industry, the rise of young stars, and its match quality. Meltzer rated the final match a five-star match. He also gave the semi-final match of Jushin Liger vs. The Great Sasuke a four-and-three-quarter star rating.

== Background ==
The tournament was conceived and produced by New Japan Pro-Wrestling's Jushin Thunder Liger and was originally intended to be a one-time event. The tournament utilized wrestlers from various promotions, competing in an invitational style. This was critical for promoting young, new wrestlers such as Dean Malenko, Chris Benoit, The Great Sasuke, and Eddie Guerrero, as well as getting less-prominent promotions recognized by the public more such as Hayabusa, who was being groomed to become a major star in Atsushi Onita's Frontier Martial-Arts Wrestling. The Super J-Cup was the first major platform for Hayabusa to showcase his talents in Japan before being called back to FMW. The promotions involved were New Japan Pro-Wrestling, Frontier Martial-Arts Wrestling, Wrestle Association R, Michinoku Pro Wrestling, Consejo Mundial de Lucha Libre, and Social Progress Wrestling Federation.

== Participants ==
The tournament was hosted by New Japan Pro-Wrestling and featured junior heavyweight wrestlers from various Japanese promotions.

Name:	Promotion:	Championship held:
Black Tiger	New Japan Pro-Wrestling	–
Dean Malenko	New Japan Pro-Wrestling	–
El Samurai	New Japan Pro-Wrestling	–
Gedo	Wrestle Association R	–
Hayabusa	Frontier Martial-Arts Wrestling	–
Jushin Liger	New Japan Pro-Wrestling	IWGP Junior Heavyweight Championship
Masayoshi Motegi	Social Progress Wrestling Federation	W*ING/WWC World Junior Heavyweight Championship
Negro Casas	Consejo Mundial de Lucha Libre / New Japan Pro-Wrestling	–
Ricky Fuji	Frontier Martial-Arts Wrestling	–
Shinjiro Otani	New Japan Pro-Wrestling	–
Super Delfin	Michinoku Pro Wrestling	UWF Super Welterweight Championship
Taka Michinoku	Michinoku Pro Wrestling	–
The Great Sasuke	Michinoku Pro Wrestling	FMW Independent World Junior Heavyweight Championship
Wild Pegasus	New Japan Pro-Wrestling	–

== Event ==
=== First round ===
The Great Sasuke and Wild Pegasus received byes in the first round. The opening match of the event featured Dean Malenko against Gedo. Both men countered each other with various submission moves until Gedo raked Malenko's eyes and hit him headbutts but Malenko whipped him in the corner and executed a suplex powerslam. Both men performed another series of submission moves until Malenko attempted to hit a kneeling reverse piledriver on Gedo but Gedo countered by hitting a kneeling reverse piledriver of his own. He then applied a STF on Malenko until Malenko crawled to the ropes and caught the ropes forcing Gedo to break the hold. Gedo then attempted a diving headbutt on Malenko but Malenko caught him by hitting a lariat to a diving Gedo in the head to gain a near-fall. Malenko followed with a diving crossbody for another near-fall. He then dashed off the ropes and Gedo executed a Powerslam for the win.

This was followed by Super Delfin taking on Shinjiro Otani. Otani dropkicked in Delfin's knees and began working on Delfin's left knee to injure it. He continued to injure the left knee until Delfin delivered a tilt-a-whirl backbreaker to Otani. Delfin tried to hit the move again but Otani countered it with a spinning back kick and a leg lariat to send Delfin outside the ring. Delfin then returned to the ring and Otani began attacking his injured left knee once again. Delfin made a comeback by raking the eyes of Otani while Otani had applied a figure four leglock on Delfin. Delfin countered a backdrop suplex attempt by Otani and hit a Brainbuster and then Delfin picked him up and tried to execute a suplex but Otani dropkicked Delfin out of the ring. Otani then delivered a diving crossbody to Delfin outside the ring. The two returned to the ring where Otani hit a springboard missile dropkick to Delfin and began injuring his left knee again. Delfin caught the ropes and Otani whipped him in the corner where he charged at Delfin but Delfin kicked him and delivered a Tornado DDT and followed by applying a Delfin Clutch on Otani to advance to the quarter-final.

Later, Taka Michinoku took on Black Tiger. Both men countered each other until Tiger hit a snapmare on Michinoku. Tiger then delivered a slingshot senton to Michinoku and followed with a Powerbomb to gain momentum. Black Tiger controlled the earlier portion of the match until Michinoku hit two shoulder blocks to Tiger and dived onto Tiger off the ropes but Tiger countered with a lariat. Michinoku began gaining control over Tiger by hitting a tilt-a-whirl headscissors takedown, which sent both men out of the ring. The action then returned to the ring where Michinoku performed a Moonsault on Tiger followed by a belly-to-belly suplex and then he sent Tiger out of the ring with a dropkick and then Michinoku delivered a diving crossbody on Tiger out of the ropes. Michinoku then tried to toss Tiger into the ring by suplexing him but Tiger countered it but fell into a German suplex by Michinoku, who followed with a Hurricanrana. He then ran through the ropes for another hurricanrana but Tiger countered it into a Powerbomb. Tiger followed with a frog splash to gain a near-fall and then he tried to pick up Michinoku, who then applied a sunset flip for a near-fall. He then delivered a Powerbomb to Tiger followed by a Moonsault for a near-fall. Michinoku attempted to perform another Moonsault but Tiger raised his knees up and then delivered a Brainbuster to Michinoku and followed with a Tornado DDT for the win.

Next, El Samurai took on Masayoshi Motegi. Motegi hit two dropkicks on Samurai to send him outside the ring and then delivered a suicide dive to Samurai and then attempted another suicide dive but Samurai punched him to gain momentum in the match. Both men exchanged momentum until Motegi began hitting rolling German suplexes on Samurai until Samurai countered into his own German suplex and then picked up Motegi and hit a Powerbomb to win the match.

The following match pitted Negro Casas against Ricky Fuji. Casas dropkicked Fuji in the beginning and then hit a snapmare and applied a headlock to gain momentum. Casas controlled the match until Fuji hit a snap suplex for a near-fall. He then attempted another snap suplex but Casas countered it into a La Magistral. Casas hit a snapmare and delivered a diving senton for a near-fall. Casas then attempted another diving senton on Fuji but Fuji avoided the move and hit two clotheslines on Casas and followed with a Tiger Driver for the victory.

The final match of the first round featured Jushin Liger against Hayabusa in Hayabusa's first match under the character in Japan. Hayabusa dropkicked Liger as the match began and delivered a spin kick to send Liger out of the ring. Hayabusa gained control with a suicide dive on Liger outside the ring and then he tossed him into the ring. Hayabusa controlled Liger by executing several moves until Liger moved out as Hayabusa attempted a knee drop on Liger's knee and then Liger dropkicked Hayabusa's knees and applied a figure four leglock. Liger then gained momentum into the match until Hayabusa made a comeback by hitting a spin kick on Liger. Hayabusa continued his attacks on Liger and then took him down with a Hurricanrana and delivered a shooting star press to Liger. Liger would eventually regain momentum by hitting a Liger Bomb on Hayabusa and then placed him on the top rope but Hayabusa knocked him down and attempted a diving hurricanrana but Liger powerbombed him and hit a fisherman suplex for the win.

=== Quarterfinals ===
The first quarter-final match of the Super J Cup was between Gedo and Super Delfin. Delfin applied an armbar as the match began. Delfin continued his momentum with an enzuigiri. Both men exchanged moves throughout the match until Delfin gained control near the end of the match by hitting a Tornado DDT on Gedo to get a near-fall. Delfin then tried to apply a Delfin Clutch on Gedo but Gedo countered with a roll-up to advance to the semi-final.

It was followed by Black Tiger taking on Wild Pegasus in Pegasus' first match in the tournament as he received a bye in the first round. After exchanging moves throughout the match, Tiger hit a springboard diving hurricanrana on Pegasus followed by a diving hurricanrana from the top rope. Tiger continued the momentum with a Brainbuster and attempted a Tornado DDT but Pegasus tossed him in the ring and then set him on the top rope but Tiger shoved him down on the mat. Tiger then dived onto Pegasus for a diving crossbody but Pegasus countered it and pinned Tiger for the victory.

The Great Sasuke competed in his first tournament match against El Samurai, who had qualified for the quarter-final by beating Shinjiro Otani. After a handshake, Samurai dominated the earlier part of the match until Sasuke gained momentum with a handspring back elbow to send Samurai out of the ring followed by a Sasuke Special on Samurai outside the ring. Sasuke tried to toss Samurai back into the ring with a suplex but Samurai countered but Sasuke slowed him down with a spin kick. Samurai regained momentum by dropkicking Sasuke out of the ring and then Samurai executed a suicide dive to Sasuke outside the ring. The action returned to the ring where Samurai hit a German suplex and then hit a diving headbutt. He attempted a Powerbomb but Sasuke countered into a Hurricanrana. Sasuke then climbed the top rope and dived onto Samurai, who caught him but Sasuke countered with a sunset flip powerbomb. Sasuke then dashed off the ropes for a Hurricanrana but Samurai countered into a Powerbomb and then attempted a diving hurricanrana but Sasuke rolled him up to win the match.

Ricky Fuji dominated Jushin Liger in the last match of the quarterfinals. After a back and forth match, Liger delivered a diving hurricanrana to Fuji to advance to the semi-final.

=== Semifinals ===
In the first semi-final match, Wild Pegasus took on Gedo. Both men were knocked out when Gedo took down Pegasus with a clothesline and missed a diving headbutt. Both men recovered and then Pegasus tried to hit a backdrop suplex but Gedo reversed it for a near-fall attempt. Pegasus then whipped Gedo in the corner of the ring and charged at him but Gedo ducked the move and then both men reversed each other until Pegasus controlled him by planting him with two Powerbombs and then hit a diving headbutt to Gedo to advance to the final.

Jushin Liger dominated The Great Sasuke during the earlier part of the next semi-final match by applying various submission holds on his opponent. Sasuke ultimately gained some momentum by dropkicking Liger mid-air while Liger was attempting a missile dropkick on Sasuke followed by a springboard moonsault, which sent both men out of the ring. Both men traded moves for the next few minutes into the match as the action returned to the ring. Liger executed a fisherman suplex to get a near-fall and then he suplexed Sasuke from the apron to the ringside area. Liger hit a diving crossbody to Sasuke and went back to the ring. Sasuke tried to return to the ring but Liger knocked him down on the apron with a kick. Sasuke then tried to dive off the ropes but slipped down. Liger made fun of him and then picked him up but Sasuke pushed him away and delivered a Hurricanrana to get the victory.

=== Final ===
Wild Pegasus and The Great Sasuke competed in the final round match. Pegasus dominated the early part of the match by working on Sasuke's injured arm. He continued his dominance over his opponent until Sasuke hit a springboard diving crossbody on Pegasus and a spinning kick to send him out of the ring and then hit a Sasuke Special to knock his opponent down on the floor. The two returned to the ring and exchanged more moves until Sasuke suplexed him out of the ring. They returned to the ring until Sasuke knocked Pegasus out of the ring for a third time with a dropkick. He hit a missile dropkick to Pegasus and then the two returned to the ring. Sasuke hit a Moonsault for a near-fall and then attempted another Moonsault but Pegasus crotched him on the ropes but Sasuke knocked him down on the floor. Pegasus eventually caught him with a gutwrench suplex from the top rope to win the tournament.

== Reception ==
Super J-Cup was a successful event as it drew a sold-out crowd of 11,500 at the Sumo Hall and was a commercial success for New Japan Pro-Wrestling while also earned critical acclaim. It drew a gross revenue of 570,000 United States dollars. Dave Meltzer of Wrestling Observer Newsletter highly praised the event, calling it "the most incredible single night of wrestling ever." The final round match of The Great Sasuke and Wild Pegasus was rated a five-star match and Sasuke versus Jushin Liger semi-final was awarded a rating of four-and-three-quarter stars. The event was not a pay-per-view event but managed to produce pay-per-view calibre matches. It received the award of Best Major Wrestling Show the final round match between The Great Sasuke and Wild Pegasus was the third-highest rated Match of the Year of the year 1994 according to Meltzer.

TJ Hawke of 411Mania gave the event a rating of 9.

Ryan of 411Mania gave it a score of 10 by writing "This was the greatest night of wrestling ever with Sasuke putting on the performance of a lifetime. No bad matches out of the 13 presented. A must have for anyone."

The Puroresu Central staff considered it "one of the single greatest all-Junior Heavyweight events of all time, with fantastic wrestling only being the tip of the iceberg", with "J Cup features some barely passable matches, but they're so few that they're likely to be completely overshadowed by the sheer number of quality wrestling matches. They're there, though. Yet, the J Cup lives up to the hype of being perhaps the single greatest and most important Junior Heavyweight tournament of all time. Simply put, the tournament not only helped Junior Heavyweight wrestling to an immense degree, it also helped every last person in it. No matter how unknown they were going in, everyone involved in the tournament left a star, with Sasuke being the shining example, who left a superstar. The greatest thing about it is that they all ended up deserving their newly-acquired fame, or with people like Liger, their still-massive popularity."

Christopher Locke of Wrestling 101 considered the Super J-Cup: 1st Stage "one of the best wrestling shows of all time" and "certainly one of the best tournaments of all time".

== Aftermath ==
The Super J-Cup was a successful event which helped popularize junior heavyweight wrestling in Japan and also gave many participating wrestlers of the tournament, a medium to elevate their careers. Participants such as Chris Benoit (Wild Pegasus), Eddie Guerrero (Black Tiger) and Dean Malenko would become very successful in North America as the three men enjoyed success in the top three North American promotions, Extreme Championship Wrestling, World Championship Wrestling and World Wrestling Federation. All three men teamed and feuded with each other and toured together in these three promotions. While being mid-carders and mainly top cruiserweight wrestlers in ECW and WCW, the trio enjoyed greater success in WWF. Malenko retired from in-ring competition in 2001, while Benoit and Guerrero became world champions in 2004.

Despite being the runner-up, The Great Sasuke became a junior heavyweight wrestling star all over the world and gained fame, allowing him to compete in several major promotions and winning many junior heavyweight titles. Jushin Thunder Liger continued his success and evolved himself into a junior heavyweight veteran, ultimately becoming the biggest junior heavyweight wrestler in Japan. Taka Michinoku went on to become the inaugural Light Heavyweight Champion in WWF, while Shinjiro Otani became the inaugural Cruiserweight Champion of WCW. Hayabusa went on to become a famous wrestler in Japan. He would ultimately succeed Atsushi Onita as the ace of Frontier Martial-Arts Wrestling (FMW), a role he held until his retirement in 2001. He was very important to FMW as the company closed down just four months after his retirement. He popularized junior heavyweight wrestling and influenced many future junior heavyweight wrestlers.

The Super J-Cup was intended to be only a one-time event but the success of the 1994 event led to the Super J-Cup booker Jushin Liger and New Japan Pro-Wrestling partnering with Último Dragón and Wrestle Association R to produce the tournament again at the same venue Sumo Hall the following year. The 1995 edition was also a success as it also drew a crowd of 11,500 people but was not equivalent to the 1994 tournament. Liger went on to win the 1995 Super J-Cup.

== Results ==
No.	Results	Stipulations	Times
1	Gedo defeated Dean Malenko	1994 Super J-Cup tournament first round	8:04
2	Super Delfin defeated Shinjiro Otani	1994 Super J-Cup tournament first round	8:06
3	Black Tiger defeated Taka Michinoku	1994 Super J-Cup tournament first round	6:47
4	El Samurai defeated Masayoshi Motegi	1994 Super J-Cup tournament first round	7:40
5	Ricky Fuji defeated Negro Casas	1994 Super J-Cup tournament first round	5:53
6	Jushin Liger defeated Hayabusa	1994 Super J-Cup tournament first round	10:23
7	Gedo defeated Super Delfin	1994 Super J-Cup tournament quarter-final	8:20
8	Wild Pegasus defeated Black Tiger	1994 Super J-Cup tournament quarter-final	10:23
9	The Great Sasuke defeated El Samurai	1994 Super J-Cup tournament quarter-final	11:40
10	Jushin Liger defeated Ricky Fuji	1994 Super J-Cup tournament quarter-final	7:50
11	Wild Pegasus defeated Gedo	1994 Super J-Cup tournament semi-final	6:18
12	The Great Sasuke defeated Jushin Liger	1994 Super J-Cup tournament semi-final	18:09
13	Wild Pegasus defeated The Great Sasuke	1994 Super J-Cup tournament final	18:46

=== Tournament brackets ===
This was a single elimination tournament with four rounds. Wild Pegasus and The Great Sasuke had byes to the quarterfinals.

Round 1
Black Tiger	Pin
Taka Michinoku	6:47
Gedo	Pin
Dean Malenko	8:04
Shinjiro Otani	8:06
Super Delfin	Pin
Ricky Fuji	Pin
Negro Casas	5:53
Hayabusa	10:23
Jushin Thunder Liger	Pin
Masayoshi Motegi	7:40
El Samurai	Pin

Quarterfinals
Wild Pegasus	Pin
Black Tiger	10:23
Gedo	Pin
Super Delfin	8:20
Ricky Fuji	7:50
Jushin Thunder Liger	Pin
El Samurai	11:40
The Great Sasuke	Pin

Semifinals
Wild Pegasus	Pin
Gedo	6:18
Jushin Thunder Liger	18:09
The Great Sasuke	Pin

Final
Wild Pegasus	Pin
The Great Sasuke	18:46
