= Chris Benoit =

Canadian professional wrestler (1967–2007)

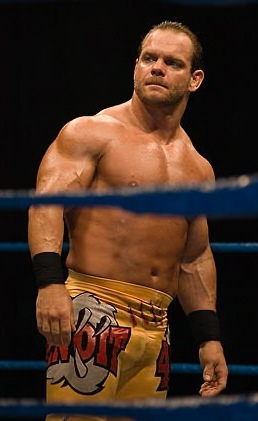
- Benoit in 2006

Personal information
- Born: Christopher Michael Benoit; May 21, 1967 Montreal, Quebec, Canada
- Died: June 24, 2007 (aged 40) Fayetteville, Georgia, U.S.
- Cause of death: Suicide by hanging
- Spouses: Martina Benoit (m. 1988; div. 1997) Nancy Benoit (m. 2000; died 2007)
- Children: 3

Professional wrestling career
- Ring name(s): Chris Benoit; The Pegasus Kid; Wild Pegasus
- Billed height: 5 ft 11 in (180 cm)
- Billed weight: 229 lb (104 kg)
- Billed from: Edmonton, Alberta (1985–2004); Atlanta, Georgia (2004–2007)
- Trained by: Bruce Hart; Stu Hart; Mike Hammer; Tokyo Joe; Tatsumi Fujinami; New Japan Pro-Wrestling
- Debut: November 22, 1985

Christopher Michael Benoit (/bəˈnwɑː/; May 21, 1967 – June 24, 2007) was a Canadian professional wrestler who worked for various promotions during his 22-year career. Despite his numerous accomplishments, he is more generally known for murdering his wife and youngest son before dying by suicide in 2007.

Bearing the nicknames The (Canadian) Crippler alongside The Rabid Wolverine throughout his career, Benoit held 30 championships between the World Wrestling Federation/World Wrestling Entertainment (WWF/WWE), World Championship Wrestling (WCW), Extreme Championship Wrestling (ECW – all United States), New Japan Pro-Wrestling (NJPW – Japan), and Stampede Wrestling (Canada). Benoit was a two-time world champion, having reigned as a one-time WCW World Heavyweight Champion and a one-time World Heavyweight Champion in WWE; he was booked to win the ECW World Championship at Vengeance: Night of Champions, which was held the night of his death. Benoit was the twelfth WWE Triple Crown Champion and the seventh WCW Triple Crown Champion, and the second of four men in history to achieve both the WWE and the WCW Triple Crown Championships. He was also the 2004 Royal Rumble winner, joining Shawn Michaels and preceding Edge as one of the three men to win the Royal Rumble match as the number one entrant. Benoit headlined multiple pay-per-views for WWF/WWE, including a victory in the World Heavyweight Championship main event of WrestleMania XX in March 2004.

In a three-day double-murder and suicide, Benoit murdered his wife in their residence on June 22, 2007, and his 7-year-old son the next day, before killing himself on June 24. The incident profoundly shocked and changed the professional wrestling industry and drew intense media criticism regarding brain injuries, substance abuse, and the long-term health of athletes in contact sports. Subsequent research undertaken by the Sports Legacy Institute (now the Concussion Legacy Foundation) suggested that depression and advanced chronic traumatic encephalopathy (CTE), a condition of brain damage, from repeated legitimate strikes to the head that Benoit had sustained throughout his pro-wrestling career were likely contributing factors of the crimes.

Due to his murders, Benoit's legacy in the professional wrestling industry is widely controversial and heavily debated. Benoit has been renowned by many for his exceptional technical wrestling ability. Prominent combat sports journalist Dave Meltzer considers Benoit "one of the top 10, maybe even [in] the top five, all-time greats" in professional wrestling history. Benoit was inducted into the Stampede Wrestling Hall of Fame in 1995 and the Wrestling Observer Newsletter Hall of Fame in 2003. His WON induction was put to a re-vote in 2008 to determine if Benoit should remain a member of their Hall of Fame. The threshold percentage of votes required to remove Benoit was not met. While arguments have been made by a number of pro-wrestling fans and industry alumni for Benoit to one day enter the WWE Hall of Fame on account of his in-ring work, the overwhelming opinion from the majority of industry veterans is that the nature of Benoit's death disqualifies him from a posthumous induction.

== Early life ==
Benoit was born in Montreal, Quebec, the son of Michael and Margaret Benoit. He grew up in Edmonton, Alberta, from where he was billed throughout the bulk of his career. He had a sister who lived near Edmonton.

During his childhood and early adolescence, Benoit idolized professional wrestlers, "Dynamite Kid" Tom Billington and Bret Hart. At the age of twelve, he attended a local wrestling event at which the two performers "stood out above everyone else". Benoit went on to train to become a professional wrestler in the Hart family "Dungeon", receiving education from the family patriarch Stu Hart. In-ring, Benoit emulated both Billington and Bret Hart, cultivating a high-risk style and physical appearance more reminiscent of the former (years later, he adopted Hart's own "Sharpshooter" hold as a finishing move).

== Professional wrestling career ==
=== Stampede Wrestling (1985–1989) ===
Benoit began his career in 1985, in Stu Hart's Stampede Wrestling promotion. From the beginning, similarities between Benoit and Billington were apparent, as Benoit adopted many of his moves such as the diving headbutt and the snap suplex; the homage was complete with his initial billing as "Dynamite" Chris Benoit. According to Benoit, in his first match, he attempted the diving headbutt before learning how to land correctly, and had the wind knocked out of him; he said he would never do the move again at that point. His debut match was a tag team match on November 22, 1985, in Calgary, Alberta, where he teamed with "The Remarkable" Rick Patterson against Butch Moffat and Mike Hammer, which Benoit's team won the match after Benoit pinned Moffat with a sunset flip. The first title Benoit ever won was the Stampede British Commonwealth Mid-Heavyweight Championship on March 18, 1988, against Gama Singh. During his tenure in Stampede, he won four International Tag Team and three more British Commonwealth titles, and had a lengthy feud with Johnny Smith that lasted for over a year, which both men traded back-and-forth the British Commonwealth title. In 1989, Stampede closed its doors, and with a recommendation from Bad News Allen, Benoit departed for New Japan Pro-Wrestling.

=== New Japan Pro-Wrestling (1986–1999) ===
Upon arriving to New Japan Pro-Wrestling (NJPW), Benoit spent about a year training in their "New Japan Dojo" with the younger wrestlers to improve his abilities. While in the dojo, he spent months doing strenuous activities like push-ups and floor sweeping before stepping into the ring. He made his Japanese debut in 1986 under his real name. In 1989, he started wearing a mask and assuming the name The Pegasus Kid. Benoit said numerous times that he originally hated the mask, but it eventually became a part of him. While with NJPW, he came into his own as a performer in matches with luminaries like Jushin Thunder Liger, Shinjiro Otani, Black Tiger, and El Samurai in their junior heavyweight division.

In August 1990, he won his first major championship, the IWGP Junior Heavyweight Championship, from Jushin Thunder Liger. He eventually lost the title in November 1990 (and in July 1991 in Japan and in November 1991 in Mexico, his mask) back to Liger, forcing him to reinvent himself as Wild Pegasus. Benoit spent the next couple years in Japan, winning the Best of the Super Juniors tournament twice in 1993 and 1995. He went on to win the inaugural Super J-Cup tournament in 1994, defeating Black Tiger, Gedo, and The Great Sasuke in the finals. He wrestled outside New Japan occasionally to compete in Mexico and Europe, where he won a few regional championships, including the UWA Light Heavyweight Championship. He held that title for over a year, having many forty-plus minute matches with Villano III.

=== World Championship Wrestling (1992–1993) ===
Benoit first came to World Championship Wrestling (WCW) in June 1992, teaming up with fellow Canadian wrestler Biff Wellington for the NWA World Tag Team Championship tournament; they were defeated by Brian Pillman and Jushin Thunder Liger in the first round at Clash of the Champions XIX.

He did not return to WCW until January 1993 at Clash of the Champions XXII, defeating Brad Armstrong. A month later, at SuperBrawl III, he lost to 2 Cold Scorpio, getting pinned with only three seconds left in the 20-minute time limit. At the same time, he formed a tag team with Bobby Eaton. After he and Eaton lost to Scorpio and Marcus Bagwell at Slamboree '93: A Legends' Reunion, Benoit headed back to Japan.

=== Various promotions (1993–1994) ===
After WCW, Benoit worked in Australia, and CMLL in Mexico. In early 1994, he worked for NWA New Jersey where he defeated Jerry Lawler. A month later he fought Terry Funk to a double count out.

=== Extreme Championship Wrestling (1994–1995) ===
In August 1994, Benoit began working with Extreme Championship Wrestling (ECW) in between tours of Japan. He was booked as a dominant wrestler there, gaining notoriety as the "Crippler" after he put Rocco Rock out. In his first appearance, Benoit competed in a one-night eight-man tournament for the vacant NWA World Heavyweight Championship, losing to 2 Cold Scorpio in the quarter-finals match.

At November to Remember, Benoit accidentally broke Sabu's neck within the opening seconds of the match. The injury came when Benoit threw Sabu with the intention that he take a face-first "pancake" bump, but Sabu attempted to turn mid-air and take a backdrop bump instead. He did not achieve full rotation and landed almost directly on his neck.

After this match Benoit returned to the locker room and broke down over the possibility that he might have paralysed someone. Paul Heyman, the head booker of ECW at the time, came up with the idea of continuing the "Crippler" moniker for Benoit. From that point until his departure from ECW, he was known as "Crippler Benoit". When he returned to WCW in October 1995, WCW modified his ring name to "Canadian Crippler Chris Benoit". In The Rise and Fall of ECW book, Heyman commented that he planned on using Benoit as a dominant heel for quite some time, before putting the company's main title, the ECW World Heavyweight Championship, on him to be the long-term champion of the company.

Benoit and Dean Malenko won the ECW World Tag Team Championship – Benoit's first American title – from Sabu and The Tazmaniac in February 1995 at Return of the Funker. After winning, they were initiated into the Triple Threat stable, led by ECW World Heavyweight Champion, Shane Douglas, as Douglas's attempt to recreate the Four Horsemen, as the three-man contingency held all three of the ECW championships at the time (Malenko also held the ECW World Television Championship at the time). The team lost the championship to The Public Enemy that April at Three Way Dance. Benoit spent some time in ECW feuding with The Steiner Brothers and rekindling the feud with 2 Cold Scorpio. He was forced to leave ECW after his work visa expired; Heyman was supposed to renew it, but he failed to make it on time, so Benoit left ECW in August 1995 as a matter of job security and the ability to enter the United States. He toured Japan until WCW called.

=== Return to WCW (1995–2000) ===
==== The Four Horsemen (1995–1999) ====
New Japan Pro-Wrestling (NJPW) and World Championship Wrestling (WCW) had a working relationship, and because of their "talent exchange" program, Benoit signed with WCW in late 1995 along with a number of talent working in New Japan to be a part of the angle. Like the majority of those who came to WCW in the exchange, he started out in as a member of the cruiserweight division, having lengthy matches against many of his former rivals in Japan on almost every single broadcast. At the end of 1995, Benoit went back to Japan as a part of the "talent exchange" to wrestle as a representative for New Japan in the Super J-Cup: 2nd Stage, defeating Lionheart in the quarterfinals (he received a bye to the quarterfinals for his work in 1995, similar to the way he advanced in the 1994 edition) and losing to Gedo in the semifinals.

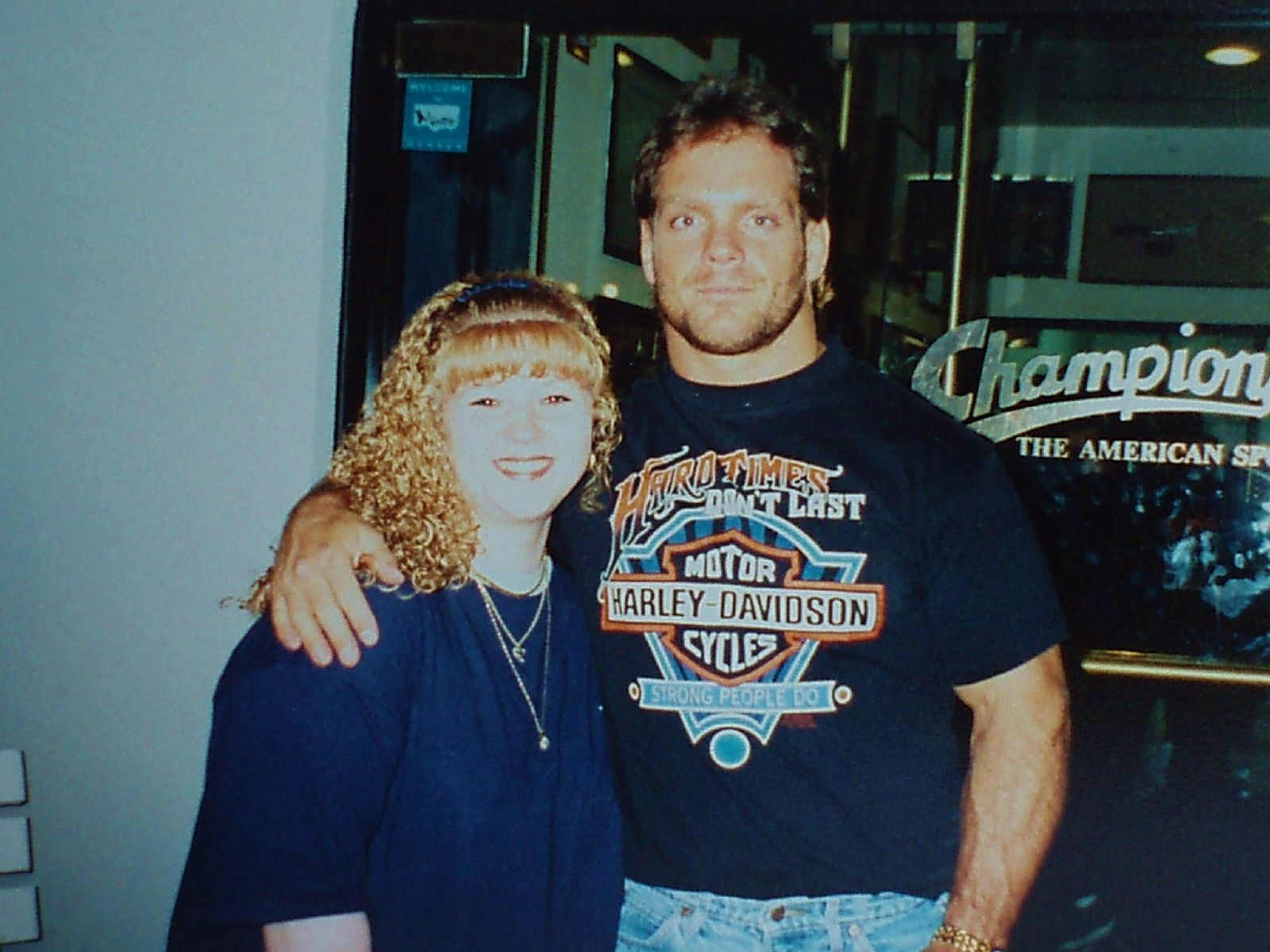
Benoit with a fan during his time in WCW

After impressing higher-ups with his work, he was approached by Ric Flair and the WCW booking staff to become a member of the reformed Four Horsemen in 1995, alongside Flair, Arn Anderson, and Brian Pillman; he was introduced by Pillman as a gruff, no-nonsense heel similar to his ECW persona, "The Crippler". He was brought in to add a new dynamic for Anderson and Flair's tormenting of Hulk Hogan and Randy Savage in their "Alliance to End Hulkamania", which saw the Horsemen team up with The Dungeon of Doom, but that alliance ended with Dungeon leader and WCW booker, Kevin Sullivan feuding with Pillman. When Pillman abruptly left the company for the WWF, Benoit was placed into his ongoing feud with Sullivan. This came to fruition through a dissension between the two in a tag team match with the two reluctantly teaming with each other against The Public Enemy, and Benoit being attacked by Sullivan at Slamboree. This led to the two having violent confrontations at pay-per-views, which led to Sullivan booking a feud in which Benoit was having an affair with Sullivan's real-life wife and onscreen valet, Nancy (also known as Woman). Benoit and Nancy were forced to spend time together to make the affair look real, (hold hands in public, share hotel rooms, etc.).

This onscreen relationship developed into a real-life affair offscreen. As a result, Sullivan and Benoit had a contentious backstage relationship at best, and an undying hatred for each other at worst. Benoit did, however, admit having a certain amount of respect for Sullivan, saying on the DVD Hard Knocks: The Chris Benoit Story that Sullivan never took undue liberties in the ring during their feud, even though he blamed Benoit for breaking up his marriage. This continued for over the course of a year with Sullivan having his enforcers apprehend Benoit in a multitude of matches. This culminated in a retirement match at the Bash at the Beach, where Benoit defeated Sullivan; this was used to explain Sullivan going to a behind-the-scenes role, where he could focus on his initial job of booking.

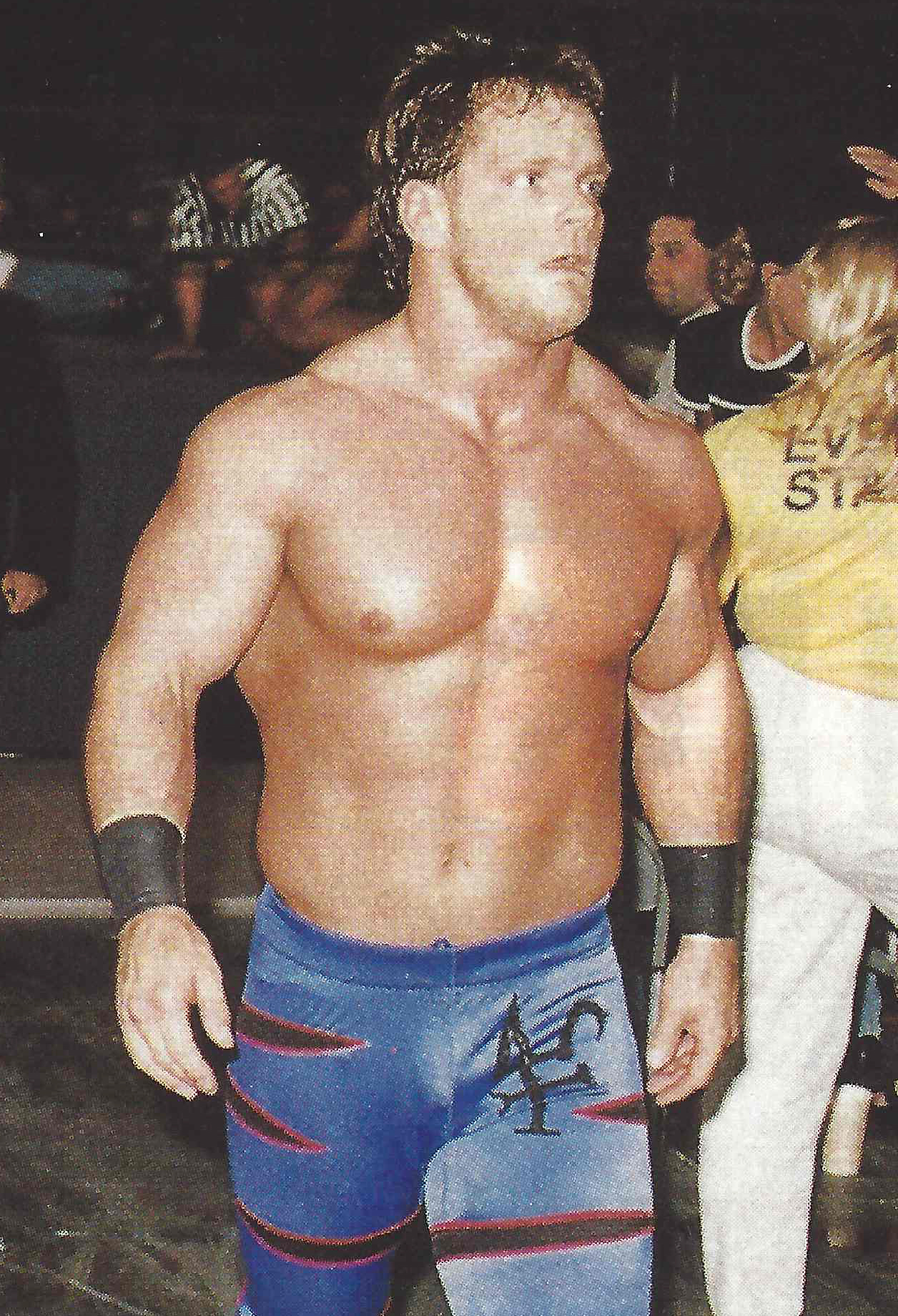
Benoit in 1999

In 1998, Benoit had a long feud with Booker T. They fought over the WCW World Television Championship until Booker lost the title to Fit Finlay. Booker won a "Best-of-Seven" series which was held between the two to determine a number one contender. Benoit went up 3 to 1 before Booker caught up, forcing the 7th and final match on Monday Nitro. During the match, Bret Hart interjected himself, interfering on behalf of Benoit in an attempt to get him to join the New World Order. Benoit refused to win that way and told the referee what happened, getting himself disqualified. Booker refused that victory, instead opting for an eighth match at the Great American Bash to see who would fight Finlay later that night. Booker won the final match and went on to beat Finlay for the title. This feud significantly elevated both men's careers as singles competitors, and both remained at the top of the midcard afterward.

In 1999, Benoit teamed with Dean Malenko once again and defeated Curt Hennig and Barry Windham to win the WCW World Tag Team Championship. This led to a reformation of the Four Horsemen with the tag team champions, Anderson, and Steve "Mongo" McMichael. The two hunted after the tag team championship for several months, feuding with teams like Raven and Perry Saturn or Billy Kidman and Rey Mysterio Jr.

==== The Revolution and World Heavyweight Champion (1999–2000) ====
After a falling out with Anderson and McMichael, Benoit and Malenko left the Horsemen; he won the WCW United States Heavyweight Championship before bringing together Malenko, Perry Saturn, and Shane Douglas to form "the Revolution".

The Revolution was a heel stable of younger wrestlers who felt slighted (both kayfabe and legitimate) by WCW management, believing they never gave them the chance to be stars, pushing older, more established wrestlers instead, despite their then-current questionable worthiness of their pushes. This led to the Revolution seceding from WCW, and forming their own nation, complete with a flag. This led to some friction being created between Benoit and leader, Douglas, who called into question Benoit's heart in the group, causing Benoit to quit the group, thus turning face, and having his own crusade against the top stars, winning the Television title one more time and the United States title from Jeff Jarrett in a ladder match. In October 1999 on Nitro in Kansas City, Missouri, Benoit wrestled Bret Hart as a tribute to Bret's brother Owen Hart, who had recently died due to an equipment malfunction. Hart defeated Benoit by submission, and the two received a standing ovation, and an embrace from guest ring announcer, Harley Race.

Benoit was unhappy working for WCW. One last attempt in January 2000 was made to try to keep him with WCW, by putting the vacant WCW World Heavyweight Championship on him by defeating Sid Vicious at Souled Out. However, due to disagreements with management and to protest the promotion of Kevin Sullivan to head booker, Benoit left WCW the next day alongside his friends Eddie Guerrero, Dean Malenko, and Perry Saturn, forfeiting his title in the process. WCW then refused to acknowledge Benoit's victory as an official title reign, and Benoit's title reign was not listed in the title lineage at WCW.com. However, the WWF recognized Benoit's title win, and Benoit's title reign is still listed in the title lineage at WWE.com. Benoit spent the next few weeks in Japan before heading to the WWF, who acknowledged his WCW World Heavyweight Championship win and presented him as a former world champion.

=== World Wrestling Federation/Wrestling Entertainment (2000–2007) ===
==== The Radicalz (2000–2001) ====
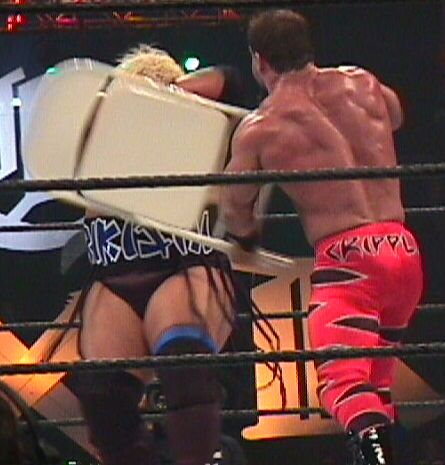
Benoit (right) was disqualified from the 2000 King of the Ring for using a chair against Rikishi.

Benoit joined the World Wrestling Federation (WWF) during its Attitude Era. Along with Guerrero, Saturn and Malenko, Benoit debuted in a stable that became known as the Radicalz. After losing their "tryout matches" upon entry, the Radicalz aligned themselves with WWF Champion Triple H and became a heel faction. At WrestleMania 2000 on April 2, Benoit pinned Chris Jericho in a triple threat match to win Kurt Angle's WWF Intercontinental Championship. In Benoit's first WWF pay-per-view main events, he challenged The Rock for the WWF Championship at Fully Loaded on July 23 and in a fatal four-way match at Unforgiven on September 24. On both occasions Benoit appeared to have won the title, only to have the decision reversed by then-WWF commissioner Mick Foley due to cheating on Benoit's part. Benoit simultaneously entered into a lengthy feud over the Intercontinental title with Jericho, who he defeated at Backlash on April 30, Judgment Day on May 21 and SummerSlam on August 27. The feud culminated in Jericho defeating Benoit in a ladder match at Royal Rumble on January 21, 2001. Benoit won the title three times between April 2000 and January 2001.

In early 2001, Benoit broke away from the Radicalz (who had reformed three months earlier) and turned face, feuding first with his former stablemates and then with Angle. Benoit lost to Angle at WrestleMania X-Seven on April 1, but defeated him in an "Ultimate Submission" match at Backlash on April 29. The feud continued after Benoit stole Angle's cherished Olympic gold medal and World Wrestling Championships gold medal, with Angle defeating Benoit at Judgment Day on May 20 in a two-out-of-three falls match with the help of Edge and Christian. In response, Benoit teamed up with his former rival Jericho to defeat Edge and Christian in that night's Tag Team Turmoil match to become the number one contenders to the WWF Tag Team Championship.

The next night on Raw Is War, Benoit and Jericho won the titles from Stone Cold Steve Austin and Triple H. On the May 24 episode of SmackDown!, Benoit suffered a legitimate neck injury in a four-way TLC match. Benoit challenged Austin for the WWF Championship on two occasions, first losing in a manner similar to the Montreal Screwjob in Calgary on the May 28 episode of Raw is War and then losing in a close match in Benoit's hometown of Edmonton on the May 31 episode of SmackDown! Despite the neck injury, Benoit continued to wrestle until the King of the Ring on June 24, where he was pinned by Austin in a triple threat match for the WWF Championship also involving Jericho. Benoit missed the next year due to his neck injury, missing the entire Invasion storyline.

==== Championship pursuits and reigns (2002–2003) ====
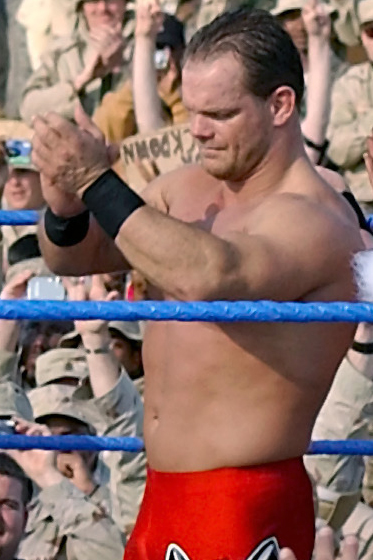
Benoit at the WWE Tribute to the Troops in 2003

During the first WWF draft, Benoit was the third wrestler picked by Vince McMahon to be part of the new SmackDown! roster, although still on the injured list. However, when Benoit returned, he did so as a member of the Raw roster, turning heel by aligning himself with Eddie Guerrero. Benoit and Guerrero lost to the Dudley Boyz (Bubba Ray and Spike) in an elimination tables match at Vengeance on July 21. The following week on Raw, Benoit defeated Rob Van Dam to become Intercontinental Champion for the fourth and final time. Benoit and Guerrero were then moved to SmackDown! during a storyline "open season" on wrestler contracts, with Benoit taking the Intercontinental Championship to SmackDown! Van Dam defeated Benoit at SummerSlam on August 25 and returned the title to Raw.

Benoit defeated Kurt Angle at Unforgiven on September 22. Benoit was then paired with Angle in a tournament to crown the first-ever WWE Tag Team Champions, defeating Edge and Rey Mysterio in the finals at No Mercy on October 20. Benoit and Angle made their first successful defense against Los Guerreros (Eddie and Chavo) at Rebellion on October 26. Benoit and Angle lost the WWE Tag Team Championship to Edge and Mysterio on the November 7 episode of SmackDown! in a two-out-of-three falls match. At Survivor Series on November 17, Benoit and Angle were the first team eliminated in a triple threat elimination match for the titles against Edge and Mysterio and Los Guerreros. Shortly after, the team split when Angle became the number one contender to the WWE Championship, turning Benoit face. Benoit defeated Eddie Guerrero on December 15 at Armageddon.

After Angle won the WWE Championship at Armageddon, Benoit feuded with Angle and his Team Angle stablemates Charlie Haas and Shelton Benjamin. On January 19, 2003, at the Royal Rumble, Benoit failed to win the title from Angle. At No Way Out on February 23, Benoit and Brock Lesnar defeated Team Angle in a handicap match. At WrestleMania XIX on March 30, Benoit and Rhyno failed to win the WWE Tag Team Championship from Team Angle in a triple threat tag team match also involving Los Guerreros. They teamed with Spanky in a loss to John Cena and The Full Blooded Italians at Judgment Day on May 18.

In June, the WCW United States Championship was reactivated and renamed the WWE United States Championship, and Benoit participated in a tournament for the title. Benoit lost in the finals to Eddie Guerrero at Vengeance on July 27 after Rhyno turned on Benoit. Benoit failed to win the title in a fatal four-way match at SummerSlam on August 24 and defeated A-Train at No Mercy on October 19. At Survivor Series on November 16, Benoit eliminated Lesnar as part of a Survivor Series elimination tag team match between Team Angle against Team Lesnar, a match Team Angle would win. As a result, Benoit challenged Lesnar for the WWE Championship on the December 4 episode of SmackDown!, but lost after passing out to Lesnar's debuting Brock Lock submission hold.

==== World Heavyweight Champion (2004–2005) ====
On the January 1, 2004 episode of SmackDown!, Benoit and Cena defeated the FBI in a handicap match to qualify for the Royal Rumble match; SmackDown! General Manager Paul Heyman named Benoit as the number one entrant. At the Royal Rumble on January 25, Benoit won the Royal Rumble match by last eliminating Big Show, earning a world title shot at WrestleMania XX and becoming the second person to win the Royal Rumble as the number one entrant after Shawn Michaels. Instead of challenging for SmackDown!'s WWE Championship, Benoit exploited a "loophole" in the rules and moved to the Raw brand to challenge World Heavyweight Champion Triple H at WrestleMania. Michaels, whose Last Man Standing match for the title against Triple H at Royal Rumble ended in a draw, thought that he deserved to be in the main event. Before Benoit could sign the contract putting himself in the main event, Michaels superkicked him and signed his name on the contract, resulting in a triple threat match between Michaels, Benoit, and the champion Triple H.

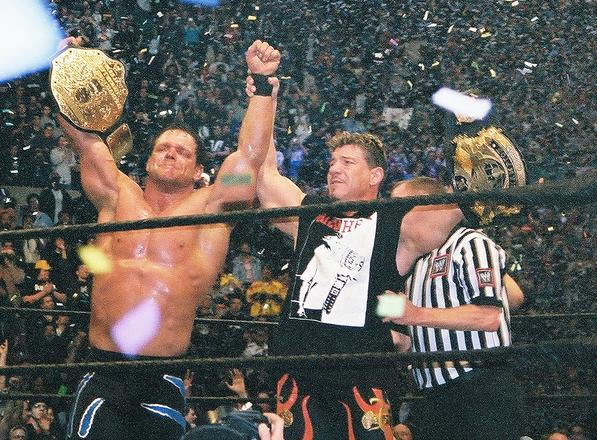
Benoit with his real-life best friend Eddie Guerrero, celebrating their respective world championship victories at WrestleMania XX

At WrestleMania XX on March 14, Benoit won the World Heavyweight Championship after Triple H submitted to his signature submission move, the Crippler Crossface, marking the first time the main event of a WrestleMania ended in submission. After the match, Benoit celebrated his win with then-reigning WWE Champion Eddie Guerrero. At Backlash on April 18, in Benoit's hometown of Edmonton, he successfully defended the title in a rematch after Michaels submitted to Benoit's Sharpshooter. The next night in Calgary on Raw, Benoit and Edge won the World Tag Team Championship from Batista and Ric Flair, making Benoit a double champion. Benoit simultaneously feuded with Kane, and Benoit and Edge lost the titles to La Résistance on the May 31 episode of Raw. On June 13, at Bad Blood, Benoit and Edge failed to regain the World Tag Team Championship (winning by disqualification when Kane interfered), while Benoit successfully defended the World Heavyweight Championship against Kane later that night. Benoit again defeated Kane to retain the title on the June 28 episode of Raw.

At Vengeance on July 11, Benoit successfully defended the title against Triple H. At SummerSlam on August 15, Benoit lost the World Heavyweight Championship to Randy Orton, ending his reign at 154 days. Benoit failed to regain the title the next night on Raw. Benoit and William Regal defeated Batista and Flair at Unforgiven on September 12.

Benoit then feuded with Edge, who had turned into an arrogant and conceited heel. At Taboo Tuesday on October 19, Benoit, Edge and Michaels were all put into a poll to see who would face Triple H for the World Heavyweight Championship that night. Michaels received the most votes, and Edge and Benoit were forced to face World Tag Team Champions La Résistance in the same night. Despite Edge deserting Benoit during the match, they regained the World Tag Team Championship, before losing the titles in a rematch on the November 1 episode of Raw. Benoit was a part of Orton's team at Survivor Series on November 14, while Edge was on Triple H's team. Despite Benoit being pinned after a Pedigree from Triple H, Orton's team won. At New Year's Revolution on January 9, 2005, Benoit and Edge competed in the Elimination Chamber match for the vacant World Heavyweight Championship, but both lost. Benoit entered the Royal Rumble as the second entrant on January 30, lasting longer than any competitor before being eliminated by Flair. Benoit competed in the inaugural Money in the Bank ladder match at WrestleMania 21 on April 3, which was won by Edge after he knocked Benoit off the ladder by smashing his arm with a chair. Their feud ended in a Last Man Standing match at Backlash on May 1, which Edge won with a brick shot to the back of Benoit's head.

==== United States Champion (2005–2007) ====
On June 9, Benoit was drafted to the SmackDown! brand after being the first man selected by SmackDown! in the 2005 Draft Lottery and participated in an ECW-style revolution against the SmackDown! heels. Benoit appeared at ECW One Night Stand on June 12, defeating Eddie Guerrero.

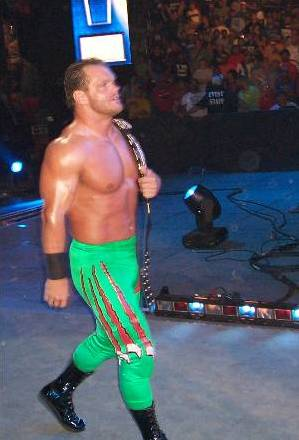
Benoit as WWE United States Champion in September 2005

On July 24, at The Great American Bash, Benoit failed to win the United States Championship from Orlando Jordan, but won it in a rematch at SummerSlam on August 21 in 25 seconds. Benoit then won three consecutive matches against Jordan in less than a minute. At No Mercy on October 9, Benoit successfully defended the title against Booker T, Christian and Jordan in a fatal-four way match. However, Booker T and his wife, Sharmell, cheated Benoit out of the title on the October 21 episode of SmackDown!

On November 13, Eddie Guerrero was found dead in his hotel room. The following night, Raw held a Guerrero tribute show hosted by both Raw and SmackDown! wrestlers. Benoit was devastated at Guerrero's death and was very emotional during a series of video testimonials, breaking down on camera. The same week on SmackDown! (taped on the same night as Raw), Benoit defeated Triple H in a tribute match to Guerrero, after which they and Dean Malenko assembled in the ring and pointed to the sky in salute of Guerrero.

After controversy surrounding a United States Championship match against Booker T on the November 25 episode of SmackDown!, Theodore Long set up a "Best of Seven" series between the two. Booker T won three times in a row at Survivor Series on November 27, the November 29 SmackDown! Special and the December 9 episode of SmackDown!, due largely to Sharmell's interference, and Benoit faced elimination in the series. Benoit won the fourth match to stay alive at Armageddon on December 18, but after the match, Booker T suffered a legitimate groin injury, and Randy Orton was chosen as a stand-in. Benoit defeated Orton twice by disqualification on the December 30 and January 6, 2006 episodes of SmackDown! However, in the seventh and final match, Orton defeated Benoit with the help of Booker T, Sharmell and Jordan, awarding Booker T the United States Championship. At No Way Out on February 19, Benoit won the title after making Booker T submit to the Crippler Crossface, ending the feud.

The next week on SmackDown!, Benoit (kayfabe) broke John "Bradshaw" Layfield (JBL)'s hand (JBL actually needed surgery to remove a cyst). At WrestleMania 22 on April 2, Benoit lost the title to JBL, who used an illegal cradle to win. Benoit used his rematch clause two weeks later in a steel cage match on SmackDown!, but JBL again won with illegal tactics. Benoit entered the King of the Ring tournament, but lost to Finlay in the first round after Finlay struck Benoit's neck with a chair and delivered a Celtic Cross. At Judgment Day on May 21, Benoit defeated Finlay. On the following episode of SmackDown!, Mark Henry brutalized Benoit during their match, giving him (kayfabe) back and rib injuries and causing him to bleed from his mouth. Benoit then took a sabbatical to heal nagging shoulder injuries.

On October 8, Benoit made his surprise return at No Mercy, defeating William Regal. Later that week, Benoit defeated Mr. Kennedy to win his fifth and final United States Championship. Benoit engaged in a feud with Chavo and Vickie Guerrero, seeking answers from them for their rash behaviour towards Rey Mysterio, but was avoided by the two and eventually assaulted. Benoit successfully defended the title against Chavo at Survivor Series on November 26, Armageddon on December 17, and in a no disqualification match on the January 19, 2007 episode of SmackDown! Benoit's next feud was with Montel Vontavious Porter (MVP), teaming with the Hardys (Jeff and Matt) to defeat MVP and MNM (Joey Mercury and Johnny Nitro) at No Way Out on February 18. Benoit successfully defended the title against MVP at WrestleMania 23 on April 1 and Backlash on April 29, before losing it to MVP in a two-out-of-three falls match at Judgment Day on May 20.

==== ECW (2007) ====
On the June 11 episode of Raw, Benoit was drafted to the ECW brand as part of the 2007 WWE draft after losing to ECW World Champion Bobby Lashley. In his debut on the ECW brand, Benoit teamed with CM Punk to defeat Elijah Burke and Marcus Cor Von. On the June 19 episode of ECW, Benoit wrestled his final match, defeating Burke in a match to determine who would compete for the vacated ECW World Championship at Vengeance on June 24. Since Lashley was drafted to Raw, he had vacated the title.

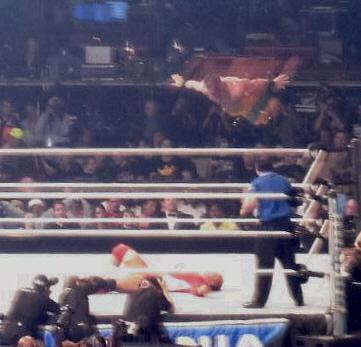
The diving headbutt (seen here at WrestleMania 23 in April 2007) was blamed as one of the primary causes of Benoit's death.

Benoit missed the weekend house shows, informing close colleagues that his wife and son were vomiting blood due to food poisoning. When he failed to show up for Vengeance, viewers were informed that he was unable to compete due to a "family emergency" and he was replaced in the title match by Johnny Nitro, who defeated Punk to become ECW World Champion. The crowd spent the majority of the match chanting for Benoit. It would be revealed in the following days that Benoit had murdered his wife Nancy and son Daniel before committing suicide.

WWE executive Stephanie McMahon later indicated that Benoit would have defeated CM Punk for the ECW World Championship had he been present for Vengeance. Professional wrestler and MMA fighter Bob Sapp, whom WWE had tried to sign up before a contract dispute with K-1 rendered it impossible, reported he would have been put into an oncoming angle with Benoit in case he would have been able to debut.

== Professional wrestling style ==
Benoit, known for his high-impact technical style, included a wide array of submission holds in his move-set and used a crossface, dubbed the Crippler Crossface, and a sharpshooter as finishers. He also used a diving headbutt, which saw him leap off the top rope and land head first on his opponent; this move was partially blamed for the head trauma that caused Benoit to commit his crimes. Another of Benoit's trademark moves was three rolling German suplexes. This move would later be mimicked by multiple other wrestlers, including Brock Lesnar who uses it as Suplex City.

Former WWE rival Kurt Angle said in a 2017 interview that "he has got to be in the top three of all time."

== Professional wrestling games ==
Year	Title	Notes
1997	WCW vs. the World	First Western video game appearance
1997	WCW vs. nWo: World Tour	
1997	Virtual Pro Wrestling 64	Only released in Japan
1998	Shin Nippon Pro Wrestling: Toukon Retsuden 3	Only released in Japan
1998	WCW Nitro	
1998	WCW/nWo Revenge	
1999	WCW/nWo Thunder	
1999	WCW Mayhem	Last WCW video game appearance
2000	WWF No Mercy	First WWF/E video game appearance
2000	WWF SmackDown! 2: Know Your Role	
2001	WWF With Authority!	Cover athlete Online game
2001	WWF Road to WrestleMania	
2001	WWF SmackDown! Just Bring It	
2002	WWF Raw	
2002	WWE WrestleMania X8	
2002	WWE Road to WrestleMania X8	
2002	WWE SmackDown! Shut Your Mouth	
2003	WWE Crush Hour	
2003	WWE WrestleMania XIX	
2003	WWE Raw 2	
2003	WWE SmackDown! Here Comes the Pain	
2004	WWE Day of Reckoning	
2004	WWE Survivor Series	Cover athlete
2004	WWE SmackDown! vs. Raw	
2005	WWE WrestleMania 21	Cover athlete (PAL version)
2005	WWE Aftershock	Cover athlete (PAL version)
2005	WWE Day of Reckoning 2	
2005	WWE SmackDown! vs. Raw 2006	
2006	WWE SmackDown vs. Raw 2007	Last video game appearance

== Personal life ==
Benoit spoke both English and French fluently. He married twice, and had two children (David and Megan) with his first wife, Martina. By 1997, that marriage had broken down, and Benoit was living with Nancy Sullivan, the wife of the WCW booker and frequent opponent Kevin Sullivan. On February 25, 2000, Chris and Nancy's son Daniel was born; on November 23, 2000, Chris and Nancy married. It was Nancy's third marriage. In 2003, Nancy filed for divorce from Benoit, citing the marriage as "irrevocably broken" and alleging "cruel treatment". She claimed that he would break and throw furniture around. She later dropped the suit as well as the restraining order she had filed.

Benoit was good friends with fellow pro-wrestlers Eddie Guerrero and Dean Malenko; the trio travelled from promotion to promotion together putting on matches, eventually being dubbed the "Three Amigos" by commentators. According to Benoit, the Crippler Crossface was borrowed from Malenko and eventually caught on as Benoit's finishing hold. After Guerrero died in November 2005, Benoit acquired a diary in which he wrote grief-stricken personal entries to a deceased Guerrero as a coping mechanism.

Benoit's lost tooth, his top-right lateral incisor, was commonly misattributed to training or an accident early on in his wrestling career. It actually resulted from an accident involving his pet Rottweiler: one day while playing with the dog, the animal's head struck Benoit's chin, and his tooth "popped out".

== Death ==
"Chris Benoit Voice Message"
This is a voice message left by Chris Benoit for Michael Parker. According to the police, the message was left at approximately 1:57 PM on Saturday, June 23, 2007. The police report states that Benoit was calling Parker regarding a situation where Parker had allegedly been mistreated in some work-related dealings.

On June 25, 2007, police entered Benoit's home in Fayetteville, Georgia, when WWE, Benoit's employers, requested a "welfare check" after Benoit missed weekend events without notice, leading to concerns. The officers discovered the bodies of Benoit, his wife Nancy, and their 7-year-old son Daniel at around 2:30 p.m. EDT. Upon investigating, no additional suspects were sought by authorities. It was determined that Benoit had committed the murders. Over a three-day period, Benoit had killed his wife and son before committing suicide. His wife was bound before the killing. Benoit's son was drugged with Xanax and likely unconscious before Benoit strangled him. Benoit then committed suicide by hanging himself on his lat pull-down machine.

WWE cancelled the scheduled three-hour-long live Raw show on June 25 and replaced the broadcast version with a three-hour tribute to Benoit's life and career, featuring his past matches, segments from the Hard Knocks: The Chris Benoit Story DVD, and comments from wrestlers and announcers. Once the details of Benoit's actions became apparent, WWE made the decision to remove nearly all mentions of Chris Benoit from their website, future broadcasts, and all publications.

Toxicology reports released on July 17, 2007, revealed that at their time of death, Nancy had three different drugs in her system: Xanax, hydrocodone, and hydromorphone, all of which were found at the therapeutic rather than toxic levels. Daniel was found to have Xanax in his system, which led the chief medical examiner to believe that he was sedated before he was murdered. Benoit was found to have Xanax, hydrocodone, and an elevated level of testosterone, caused by a synthetic form of the hormone, in his system. The chief medical examiner attributed the testosterone level to Benoit possibly being treated for a deficiency caused by previous steroid abuse or testicular insufficiency. There was no indication that anything in Benoit's body contributed to his violent behaviour that led to the murder-suicide, concluding that there was no "roid-rage" involved. Prior to the murder-suicide, Benoit had illegally been given medications not in compliance with WWE's Talent Wellness Program in February 2006, including nandrolone, an anabolic steroid, and anastrozole, a breast cancer medication which is used by bodybuilders for its powerful antiestrogenic effects. During the investigation into steroid abuse, it was revealed that other wrestlers had also been given steroids.

After the double-murder suicide, neuroscientist and retired professional wrestler Christopher Nowinski contacted Michael Benoit, Chris's father, suggesting that years of trauma to his son's brain may have led to his actions. Tests were conducted on Benoit's brain by Julian Bailes, the head of neurosurgery at West Virginia University, and results showed that "Benoit's brain was so severely damaged it resembled the brain of an 85-year-old Alzheimer's patient." He was reported to have had an advanced form of dementia, similar to the brains of four retired NFL players who had multiple concussions, sank into depression, and harmed themselves or others. Bailes and his colleagues concluded that repeated concussions can lead to dementia, which can contribute to severe behavioural problems. Benoit's father suggests that brain damage may have been the leading cause.

== Championships and accomplishments ==
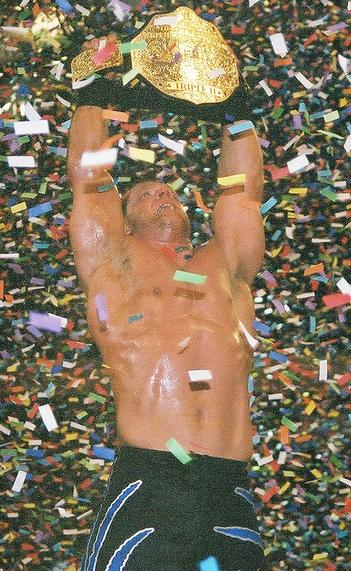
Benoit celebrating with the World Heavyweight Championship at WrestleMania XX

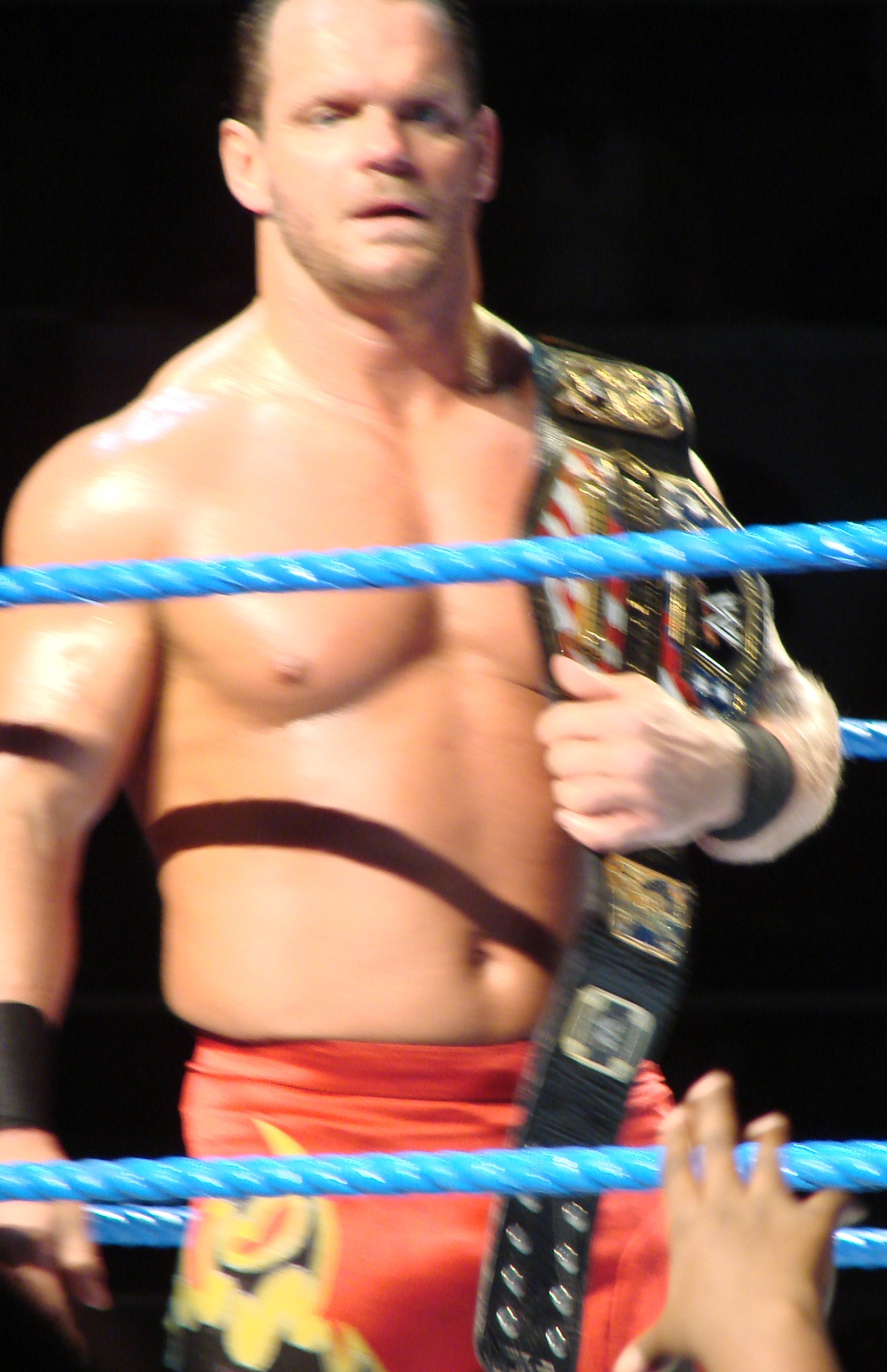
Benoit won the United States Championship a total of five times across WWE and WCW.

- Cauliflower Alley Club
  - Future Legend Award (2002)
- Catch Wrestling Association
  - CWA World Tag Team Championship (1 time) – with Dave Taylor
- Extreme Championship Wrestling
  - ECW World Tag Team Championship (1 time) – with Dean Malenko
- New Japan Pro-Wrestling
  - IWGP Junior Heavyweight Championship (1 time)
  - Super J-Cup (1994)
  - Top/Best of the Super Juniors (1993, 1995)
  - Super Grade Junior Heavyweight Tag League (1994) – with Shinjiro Otani
- Pro Wrestling Illustrated
  - Feud of the Year (2004) vs. Triple H
  - Match of the Year (2004) vs. Shawn Michaels and Triple H at WrestleMania XX
  - Wrestler of the Year (2004)
  - Ranked No. 69 of the top 500 greatest wrestlers in the PWI Years in 2003
  - Ranked No. 1 of the top 500 singles wrestlers in the PWI 500 in 2004
- Stampede Wrestling
  - Stampede British Commonwealth Mid-Heavyweight Championship (4 times)
  - Stampede Wrestling International Tag Team Championship (4 times) – with Ben Bassarab (1), Keith Hart (1), Lance Idol (1), and Biff Wellington (1)
  - Stampede Wrestling Hall of Fame (1995)
- Universal Wrestling Association
  - WWF Light Heavyweight Championship (1 time) (Note: Benoit's reign with the championship is not recognized by WWE, who does not recognize any reign prior to December 1997.)
- World Championship Wrestling
  - WCW World Heavyweight Championship (1 time) (Note: After Benoit left WCW for the WWF, WCW refused to acknowledge Benoit's victory as an official title reign, and Benoit's title reign was not listed in the title lineage at WCW.com. However, the WWF recognized Benoit's title win, and Benoit's title reign is still listed in the title lineage at WWE.com.)
  - WCW World Tag Team Championship (2 times) – with Dean Malenko (1) and Perry Saturn (1)
  - WCW World Television Championship (3 times)
  - WCW United States Heavyweight Championship (2 times)
  - WCW Triple Crown Champion (7th)
- World Wrestling Federation/Entertainment
  - World Heavyweight Championship (1 time)
  - WWE Tag Team Championship (1 time, inaugural) – with Kurt Angle
  - WWE United States Championship (3 times)
  - WWF/WWE Intercontinental Championship (4 times)
  - WWF/World Tag Team Championship (3 times) – with Chris Jericho (1) and Edge (2)
  - Royal Rumble (2004)
  - WWE Tag Team Championship Tournament (2002) – with Kurt Angle
  - Triple Crown Champion (12th)
- Wrestling Observer Newsletter
  - Best Brawler (2004)
  - Best Technical Wrestler (1994, 1995, 2000, 2003, 2004)
  - Feud of the Year (2004) vs. Shawn Michaels and Triple H
  - Match of the Year (2002) with Kurt Angle vs. Edge and Rey Mysterio at No Mercy
  - Most Outstanding Wrestler (2000, 2004)
  - Most Underrated (1998)
  - Readers' Favorite Wrestler (1997, 2000)
  - Wrestling Observer Newsletter Hall of Fame (Class of 2003) (Note: Benoit underwent a special recall election in 2008 due to the double murder-suicide of his wife and son. The recall was supported by a majority of 53.6% of voters, but was below the 60% threshold necessary to remove him.)

== See also ==
- Chronic traumatic encephalopathy
- List of premature professional wrestling deaths

== Sources ==
- Royal Duncan & Gary Will (2006). Wrestling Title Histories (4th ed.). Archeus Communications. ISBN 978-0-9698161-5-7.
- Kevin Dunn (Director) (2004). Hard Knocks: The Chris Benoit Story (DVD). WWE Home Video.
- SLAM! Wrestling — Chris Benoit
- Metro — 60 Seconds: Chris Benoit by Andrew Williams
- Wrestling Digest: Technically Speaking, wrestler and sports entertainer Chris Benoit
