= Gedo (wrestler) =

Japanese professional wrestler

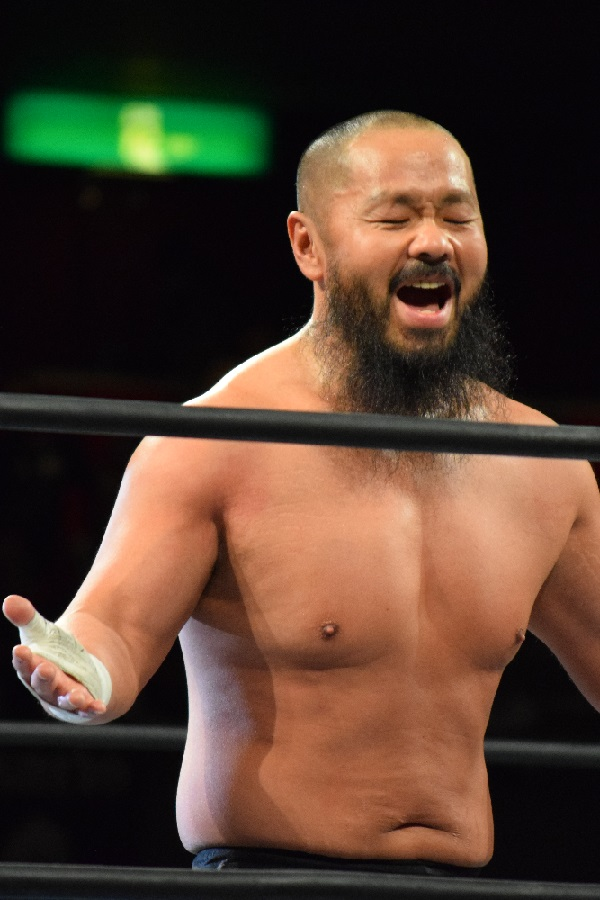
- Gedo in 2017

Personal information
- Born: Keiji Takayama (高山 圭司, Takayama Keiji); February 20, 1969 (age 57) Musashimurayama, Tokyo, Japan

Professional wrestling career
- Ring name(s): Bulldog K.T. C.T.U Ranger Green; Crush; Gedo
- Billed height: 1.72 m (5 ft 8 in)
- Billed weight: 86 kg (190 lb)
- Trained by: Gran Hamada; NJPW Dojo
- Debut: March 19, 1989

Keiji Takayama (高山 圭司, Takayama Keiji; born February 20, 1969) is a Japanese professional wrestler, manager and booker. He is signed to New Japan Pro-Wrestling (NJPW) under the ring name Gedo (外道, Gedō). Gedo has been the main booker of NJPW since the early 2010s. As a wrestler, Gedo is best known for his tag team work with partner Jado, forming a very successful tag team from 1990 through the mid-2010s.

Alongside his backstage work, Gedo is also an on-screen character in NJPW, working as a manager for the Unbound Co. faction. Prior to this, he was the manager of Chaos, Bullet Club, Kazuchika Okada (Chaos's former second leader), Jay White (Bullet Club's former fourth leader) and David Finlay (Bullet Club's former fifth and final leader). Jado and Gedo have won the IWGP Junior Heavyweight Tag Team Championship four times, the GHC Junior Heavyweight Tag Team Championship one-time, BJW Tag Team Championship and several other tag team championships. Gedo is an eight-time recipient of the Best Booker award from the Wrestling Observer Newsletter.

== Professional wrestling career ==
=== Early career (1989–2001) ===
Gedo debuted on March 19, 1989, for New Japan Pro-Wrestling (NJPW) during the Takeshi Puroresu Gundan (TPG), NJPW's parody of World Wrestling Federation's Rock 'n Wrestling era. His debut match was against Magic Monkey Wakita, who would later be known as Super Delfin, on March 19, 1989. After TPG died out, Gedo, Wakita, and TPG comrade Jado left NJPW. Jado and Gedo went on to become one of the premiere tag teams in Japan.

Jado and Gedo headed to the Universal Wrestling Association in Mexico as Punish (Jado) and Crush (Gedo), and defeated Silver King and El Texano for the UWA/UWF Intercontinental Tag Team Championship on November 8, 1991. They would win these belts on two more occasions in 1992. This led to their many tours with W*NG and were a part of the incident where Kanemura was burnt. Jado and Gedo headed to Wrestling and Romance in 1994 and became one of the top tag teams there, forming a group with Kodo Fuyuki called Fuyuki-Gun. Gedo had the distinction of becoming the first title holder of all of WAR's titles as Fuyuki-Gun were the inaugural holders of the WAR World Six-Man Tag Team Championship, which they won five times while Gedo was also the inaugural International Junior Heavyweight Champion and the inaugural International Junior Heavyweight Tag Team Champion with Lion Do.

Gedo, with the addition of being an accomplished tag team wrestler, was also one of the top junior heavyweights in Japan in the first half of the 1990s. Gedo reached the semi-finals of the 1994 Super J-Cup where he would lose to Wild Pegasus. Gedo was in the 1995 Super J-Cup and reached the finals, losing to Jushin Thunder Liger in his fourth match of the night. Gedo won his first singles title when he defeated Lionheart in a tournament final to become the inaugural International Junior Heavyweight Champion on March 26, 1995. Gedo would win this belt again, defeating Último Dragón for it.

Jado and Gedo left WAR, which was declining, and headed to Frontier Martial-Arts Wrestling, one of Japan's top independent promotions. Gedo, with Jado and Kodo Fuyuki, won the FMW World Street Fight 6-Man Tag Team Championship, defeating the Headhunters and Hisakatsu Oya on March 21, 1997. It was also in 1997 that Gedo toured North America, appearing at the 1997 WCW Halloween Havoc show wrestling Chris Jericho, and winning the CRMW North American Mid-Heavyweight Championship defeating Ricky Fuji on August 31, 1997. During the Halloween Havoc show, Mike Tenay called Gedo the Dusty Rhodes of Japan. He further said that Gedo was a fan of 1970s U.S. Southern style brawling.

=== New Japan Pro-Wrestling ===
==== Tag team success, Great Bash Heel and Chaos (2001–2011) ====
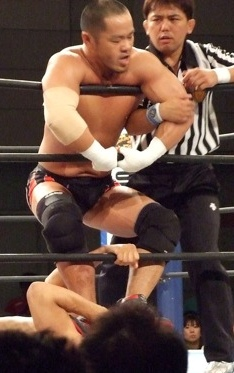
Gedo in June 2011

Gedo won the FMW Brass Knuckles Tag Team Championship not with Jado but with Koji Nakagawa when they defeated Masato Tanaka and Tetsuhiro Kuroda on June 13, 1999. Gedo would leave FMW in 2001 along with Masato Tanaka, Jado, Hideki Hosaka, and Kaori Nakayama with the group becoming freelancers with Gedo mostly working in Michinoku Pro. Gedo along with Jado would eventually return to New Japan and win the IWGP Junior Heavyweight Tag Team Championship when they defeated Jyushin Thunder Liger and El Samurai on July 20, 2001. Gedo had a fierce rivalry with Liger after Jado and Gedo made a surprise appearance in NJPW when they both pulled Liger's mask off. Jado and Gedo won the IWGP Junior Heavyweight belts for a second time in 2003 after again defeating Liger and Samurai. In 2007, Gedo was offered a contract by World Wrestling Entertainment (WWE), but turned it down because he would have been required to portray a stereotypical Japanese character. In July 2007, Gedo and Jado joined the Great Bash Heel (GBH) faction. The tag team would compete in the 2007 G1 Tag League, but failed to win, with a final tally of 6 points. In April 2009 Gedo and Jado left GBH and became founding members of the Chaos stable. On November 13, 2010, Jado and Gedo returned to the top of New Japan's Junior Tag Team division by defeating their Chaos team mates Davey Richards and Rocky Romero in the finals of a five-day-long tournament to win the 2010 Super J Tag League. As a result of their victory, Gedo and Jado received a match for the IWGP Junior Heavyweight Tag Team Championship, which took place at a Dramatic Dream Team (DDT) event on December 26, 2010, where they were defeated by the defending champions, the Golden☆Lovers (Kenny Omega and Kota Ibushi). At the end of 2011, the Wrestling Observer Newsletter named Gedo and Jado the bookers of the year. They have won the award three more times since then.

==== Main booker and manager (2013–2018) ====
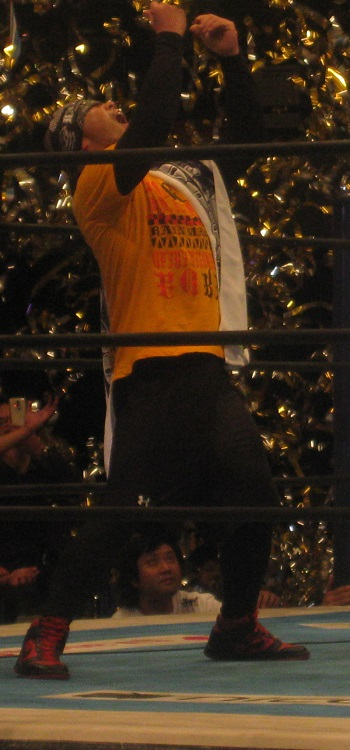
Gedo celebrates Kazuchika Okada's victory at Power Struggle 2013

On July 5, 2013, Gedo received his first shot at the IWGP Junior Heavyweight Championship in nearly a decade as he attempted to stop Prince Devitt from earning a shot at Okada's IWGP Heavyweight Championship. Gedo, however, failed in his challenge and Devitt advanced to the match with Okada. On November 1, Gedo and Jado received their first shot at the IWGP Junior Heavyweight Tag Team Championship in three years, but were defeated by the defending champions, Suzuki-gun (Taichi and Taka Michinoku).

In early 2015, Gedo became the primary booker of New Japan, when Jado took over as the new booker of Pro Wrestling Noah.

==== Bullet Club (2018–2026) ====
At the 2018 G1 Climax Finals, Okada parted ways with Gedo. Gedo returned at Destruction in Kobe, where it appeared he was going to save Okada but instead, hit him with a chair, becoming Jay White's new manager. At King of Pro-Wrestling, Gedo, White, and longtime tag partner Jado all completed their defection from Chaos to align themselves with Bullet Club. Throughout White's tenure as Bullet Club leader, Gedo managed White, as well as still wrestling occasionally, mostly in tag matches with White and other Bullet Club members. After White's departure from NJPW, Gedo began managing David Finlay, who became the new leader of Bullet Club. Gedo and Finlay later formed a sub-group to Bullet Club called "Bullet Club War Dogs", which consisted of the duo with Alex Coughlin, Clark Connors, Drilla Moloney, and Gabe Kidd, with wrestlers such as Jake Lee, Sanada, and Taiji Ishimori joining later on.

On November 8, 2025, Gedo reunited with Kazuchika Okada as the latter made his surprise return to NJPW as a heel and was confirmed to be Hiroshi Tanahashi's opponent in his retirement match at Wrestle Kingdom 20. At the event on January 4, 2026, Okada defeated Tanahashi with Gedo in his corner.

==== Unbound Co. (2026–present) ====
After Wrestle Kingdom 20, at New Year Dash!!, David Finlay and Yota Tsuji announced the dissolution of Bullet Club and Mushozoku, replacing the alliance with Unbound Company, which was a complete merger.

=== Pro Wrestling Noah (2016) ===
On June 12, 2016, Gedo made a surprise appearance at a Pro Wrestling Noah event. He reunited with Jado to unsuccessfully challenge Atsushi Kotoge and Daisuke Harada for Noah's GHC Junior Heavyweight Tag Team Championship in a three-way match, also involving Taichi and Taka Michinoku. On October 8, Gedo and Jado defeated Kotoge and Harada to win the GHC Junior Heavyweight Tag Team Championship. They lost the title back to Kotoge and Harada on December 24.

== Championships and accomplishments ==
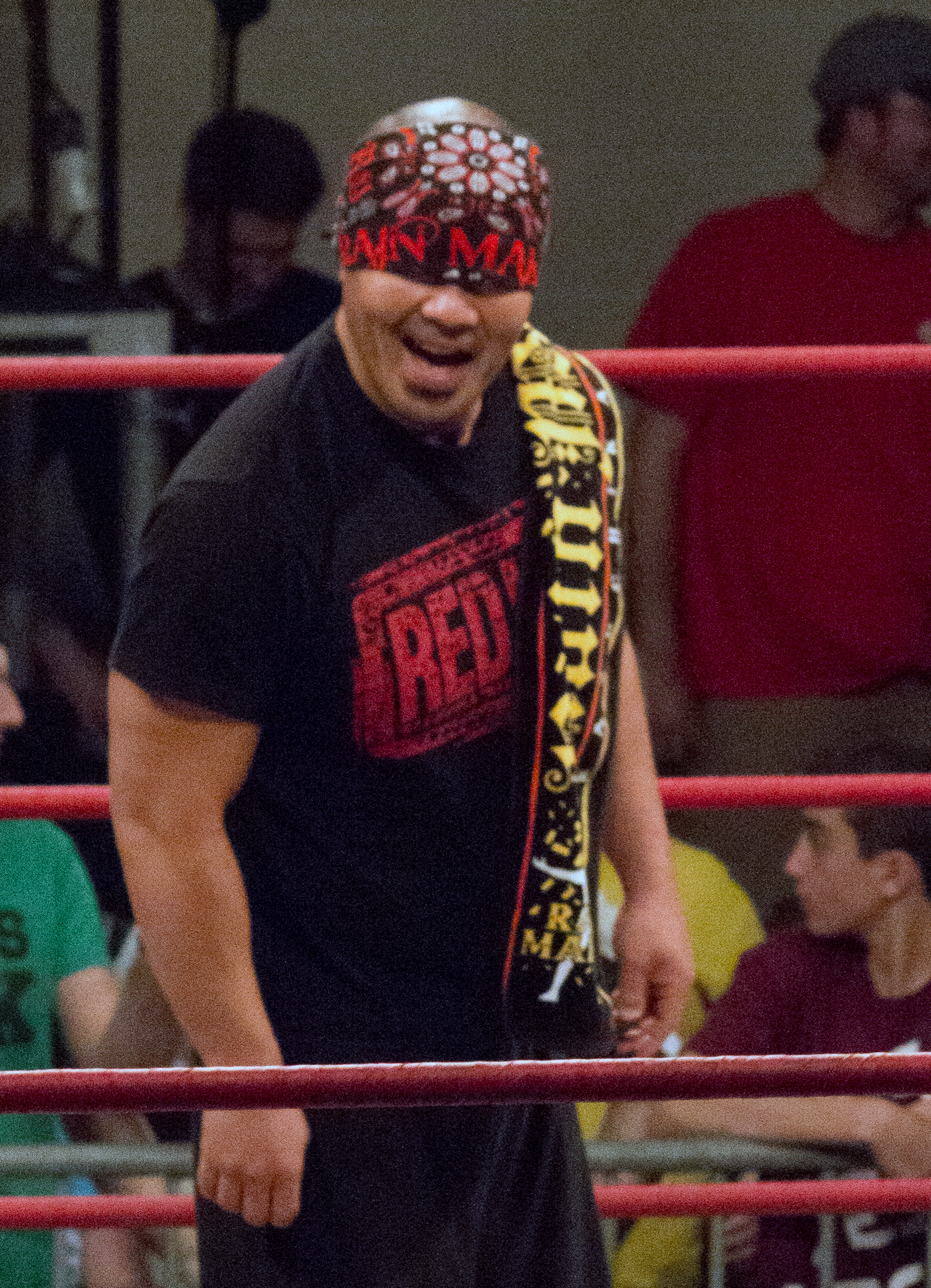
Gedo in May 2014

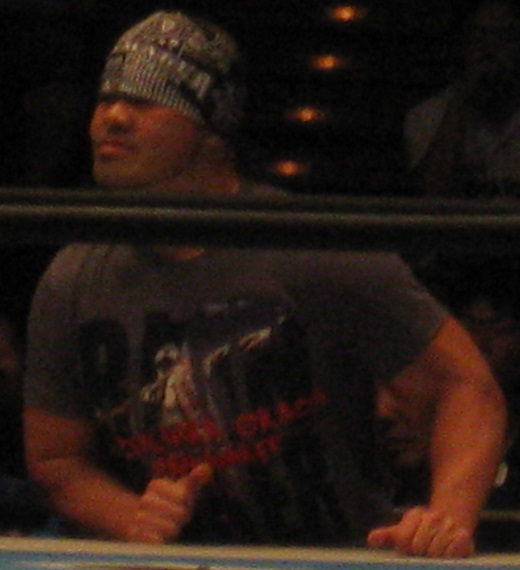
Gedo in September 2013

- Big Japan Pro Wrestling
  - BJW Tag Team Championship (1 time) – with Jado
- Frontier Martial-Arts Wrestling / World Entertainment Wrestling
  - FMW Brass Knuckles Tag Team Championship (1 time) – with Koji Nakagawa
  - FMW World Street Fight 6-Man Tag Team Championship (1 time) – with Kodo Fuyuki and Jado
  - WEW Hardcore Tag Team Championship (1 time) – with Jado
  - WEW 6-Man Tag Team Championship (5 times) – with Kodo Fuyuki and Koji Nakagawa (1), Koji Nakagawa and Jado (2), Jado and Kaori Nakayama (1), and Jado and Masato Tanaka (1)
  - WEW Tag Team Championship (3 times) – with Koji Nakagawa (1), Kodo Fuyuki (1) and Masato Tanaka (1)
  - WEW 6-Man Tag Team Championship Tournament (1999) - with Kodo Fuyuki and Jado
- New Japan Pro-Wrestling
  - IWGP Junior Heavyweight Tag Team Championship (4 times) – with Jado
  - DREAM* Win Jr. Tag Team Tournament (2002) – with El Samurai
  - IWGP Junior Heavyweight Tag Team Title Tournament (2003) - with Jado
  - Super J Tag League (2010) – with Jado
- Pro Wrestling Illustrated
  - Ranked No. 121 of the top 500 singles wrestlers in the PWI 500 in 2006
- Pro Wrestling Noah
  - GHC Junior Heavyweight Tag Team Championship (1 time) – with Jado
- Tokyo Sports
  - Best Tag Team Award (2001) – with Jado
- Toryumon X
  - UWA World Trios Championship (1 time) – with Jado and Katsushi Takemura
- Universal Wrestling Association
  - UWA/UWF Intercontinental Tag Team Championship (4 times) – with Punish (2), Pat Tanaka (1) and Dick Togo (1)
- Wrestle Association "R"
  - WAR International Junior Heavyweight Championship (2 times)
  - International Junior Heavyweight Tag Team Championship (1 time) – with Lion Do
  - WAR World Six-Man Tag Team Championship (5 times) – with Hiromichi Fuyuki and Jado
  - WAR World Six-Man Tag Team Championship Tournament (1994) - with Hiromichi Fuyuki and Jado
  - Super J Cup 1995 Contestant Decision Tournament (1995) - with Último Dragón and Lionheart
  - WAR International Junior Heavyweight Championship Tournament (1995)
  - WAR International Junior Heavyweight Tag Team Championship Tournament (1996) – with Lion Do
- Wrestling Observer Newsletter
  - Best Booker (2011–2014) – with Jado
  - Best Booker (2016–2019)
  - Wrestling Observer Newsletter Hall of Fame (Class of 2019)
