= Killing of Rikidōzan =

Murder of Japanese professional wrestler Rikidōzan

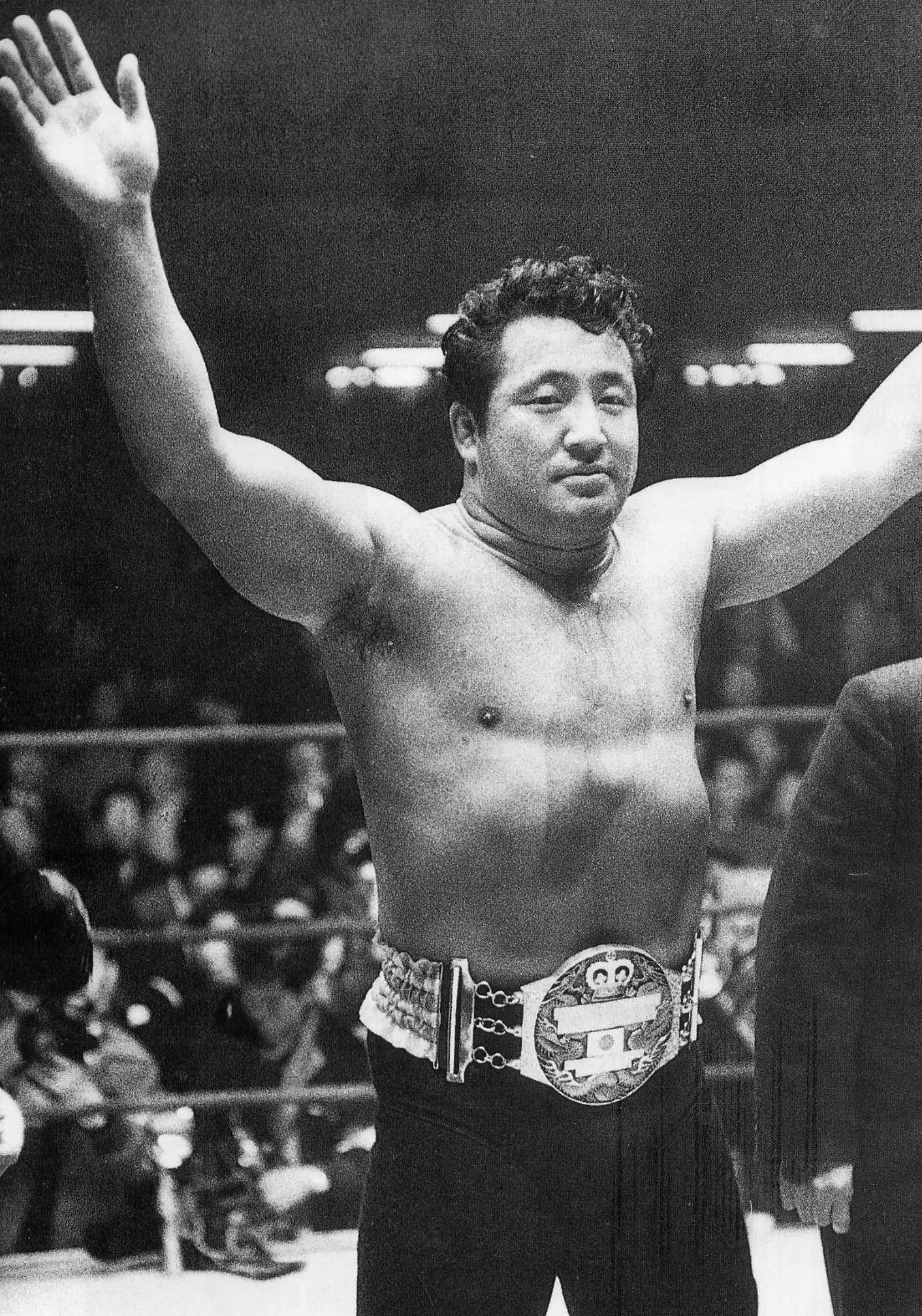
- Location: Akasaka, Tokyo, Japan
- Date: December 8, 1963; 62 years ago 10:30 p.m. (JST)
- Attack type: Murder
- Weapon: Knife
- Victims: Mitsuhiro Momota (百田 光浩, Momota Mitsuhiro)
- Perpetrator: Katsushi Murata

On December 8, 1963, the Japanese professional wrestler Rikidōzan, real name Mitsuhiro Momota, was stabbed in a Tokyo nightclub after an altercation with a Yakuza member. Considered the "godfather of puroresu", Rikidōzan was a national hero in post-World War II Japan and considered one of the most famous people in the whole country. One week after being stabbed, he died from peritonitis on December 15, 1963. He was 39 years old.

== Background ==
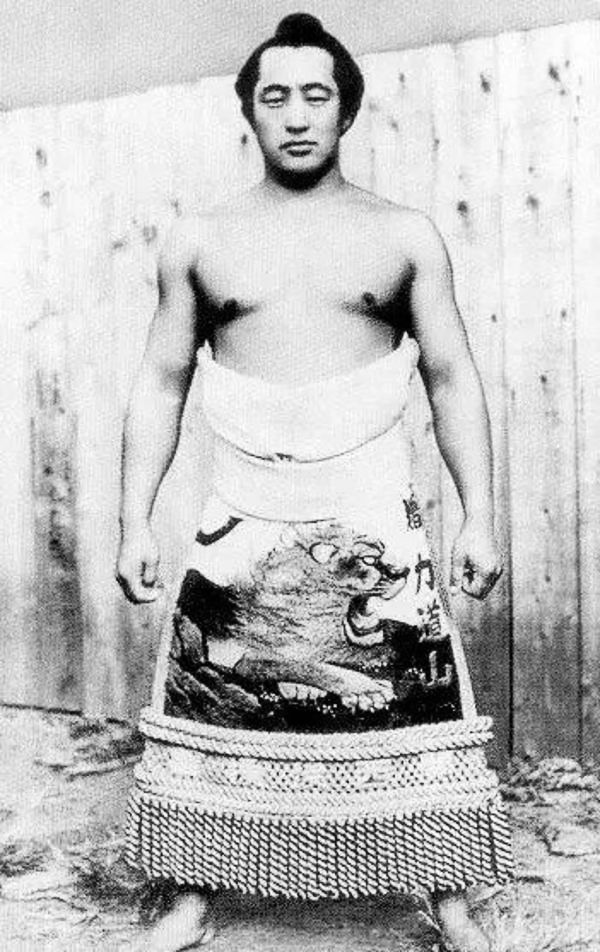
Rikidōzan during his sumo days

Rikidōzan was born Kim Sin-rak in South Hamgyong, Japanese-occupied Korea (modern North Korea) on November 14, 1924. After his father's death in 1939, he was adopted by a family in the Nagasaki Prefecture of Japan. To avoid discrimination, he changed his name to Mitsuhiro Momota (百田 光浩, Momota Mitsuhiro), and first became a sumo wrestler, earning the Shikona Rikidōzan. He later left sumo in 1950, and after attending an American wrestling show in 1951, became a pro-wrestler. In post-World War II Japan, Rikidōzan turned himself into a national hero by booking himself to defeat numerous American wrestlers one after the other. Rikidōzan gained worldwide renown when he defeated Lou Thesz for the NWA International Heavyweight Championship on August 27, 1958, in Japan. In another match, Thesz willingly agreed to put over Rikidōzan at the expense of his own reputation. This built up mutual respect between the two wrestlers, and Rikidōzan never forgot what Thesz did. He would go on to capture several NWA titles in matches both in Japan and overseas. Rikidōzan also trained professional wrestling students, including soon-to-be wrestling legends Kanji "Antonio" Inoki, Kintarō Ōki, and Shohei "Giant" Baba.

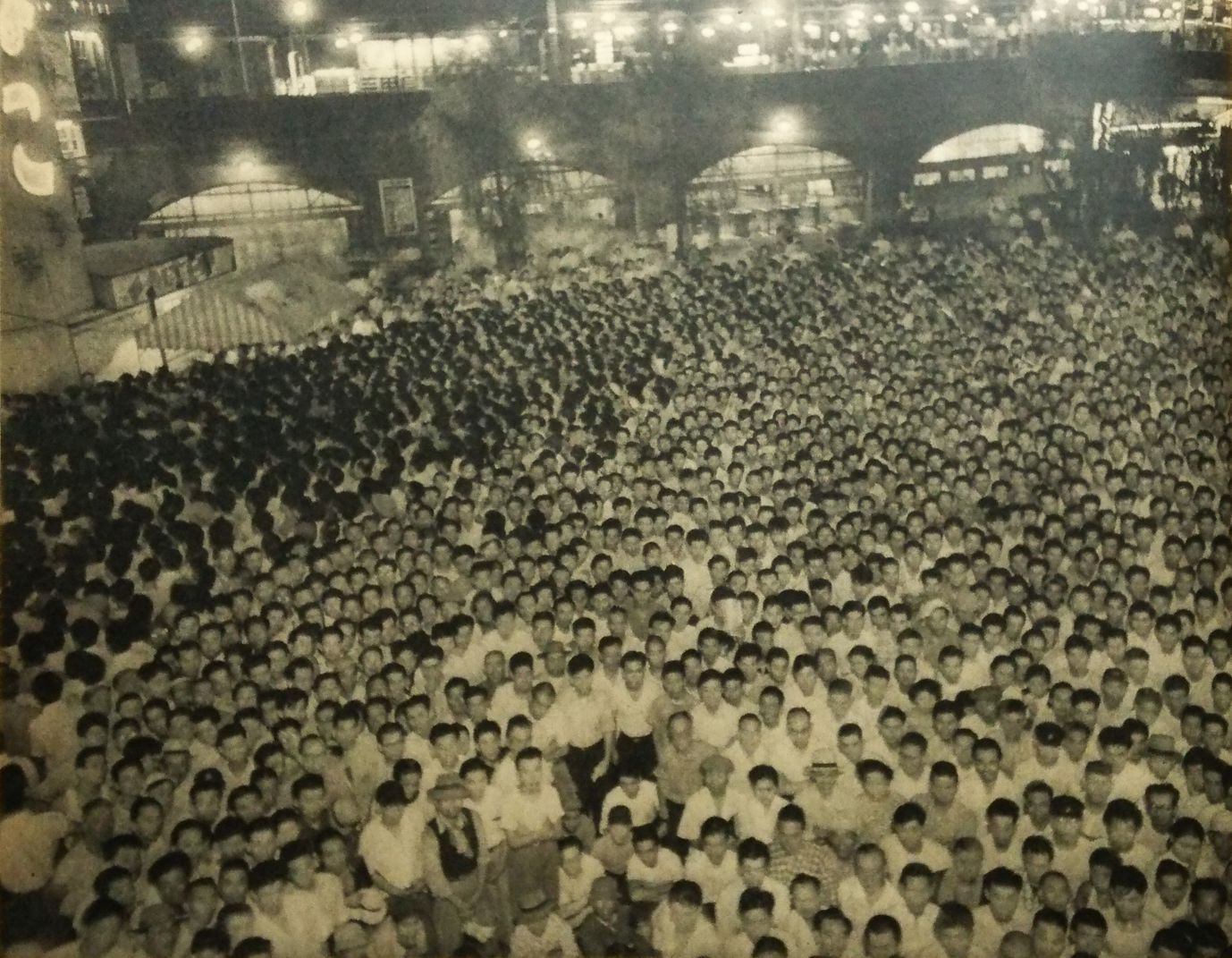
A crowd of people gathered to watch one of Rikidōzan's matches in 1955

With his success in pro wrestling, Rikidōzan began acquiring properties such as nightclubs, hotels, condominiums and boxing promotions. He established the Japan Pro Wrestling Alliance (JWA), Japan's first professional wrestling promotion, in 1953. Booking himself as the top star, Rikidōzan became more popular than ever, being viewed as a hero in the eyes of the Japanese public and helping establish professional wrestling in Japan. One of Rikidōzan's biggest matches, a May 24, 1963, sixty-minute two out of three falls draw with The Destroyer drew a 67.0 rating, the largest in Japanese history. Rikidōzan's JWA was also instrumental in increasing sales of colour televisions in Japan, due to high demand of wanting to see his matches. Rikidōzan was considered to be the "godfather" of pro wrestling in Japan, with newspapers and magazines saying "even if you did not know the name of the prime minister, there is no one who did not know the name of Rikidōzan" during the 1960s.

== Incident ==
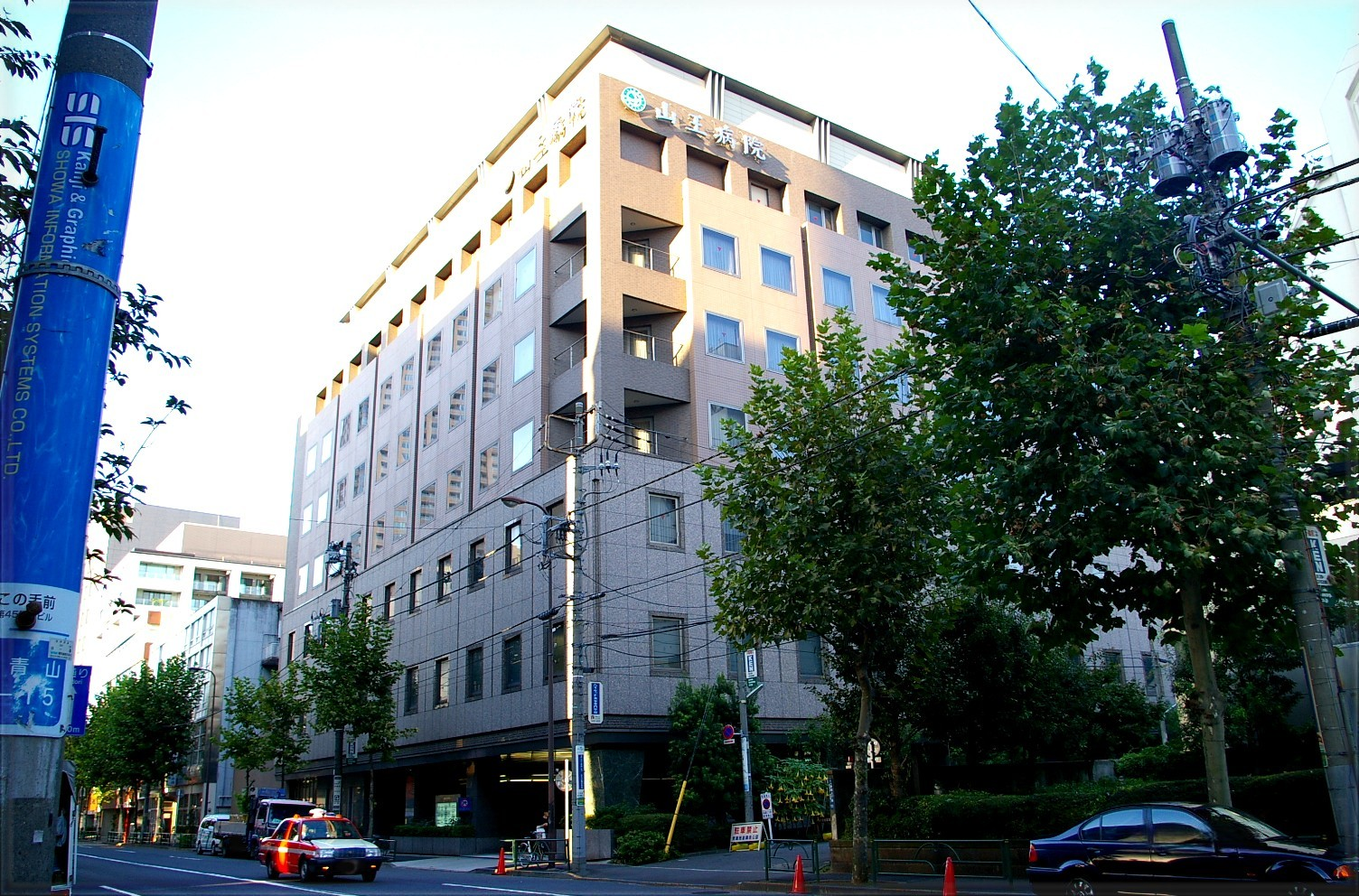
Rikidōzan entered Sannō Hospital after being stabbed

On the evening of December 8, 1963, Rikidōzan had been drinking with friends in Tokyo's New Latin Quarter Club, an upscale bar and nightclub. Later, while talking to a woman, he was involved in an altercation with Katsushi Murata, a member of the Sumiyoshi-ikka, a sub branch of the Sumiyoshi-kai yakuza family. Rikidōzan alleged that Murata stepped on his shoe, and demanded an apology. Murata refused and the two began to argue, with Murata pulling out a knife from his belt, which Rikidōzan saw and said, "I understand, let's make up, I apologise". Murata refused the apology, and Rikidōzan punched Murata in the face, knocking him against a wall. Rikidōzan then mounted Murata and continued to punch him on the ground until Murata stabbed Rikidōzan once in the abdomen. Immediately, Murata fled the scene and Rikidōzan went to Sannō Hospital, a hospital centered mainly on obstetric gynecology, but Rikidōzan chose it due to the fact he knew one of the doctors well and could prevent the story from appearing in tabloids. The doctor examined the wound and decreed it to be non-fatal, but advised him to have surgery. After members of the Tokon Gossai, a gang closely associated with Rikidōzan, caught wind of the stabbing incident, they found and violently attacked Murata which led to his own hospitalization.

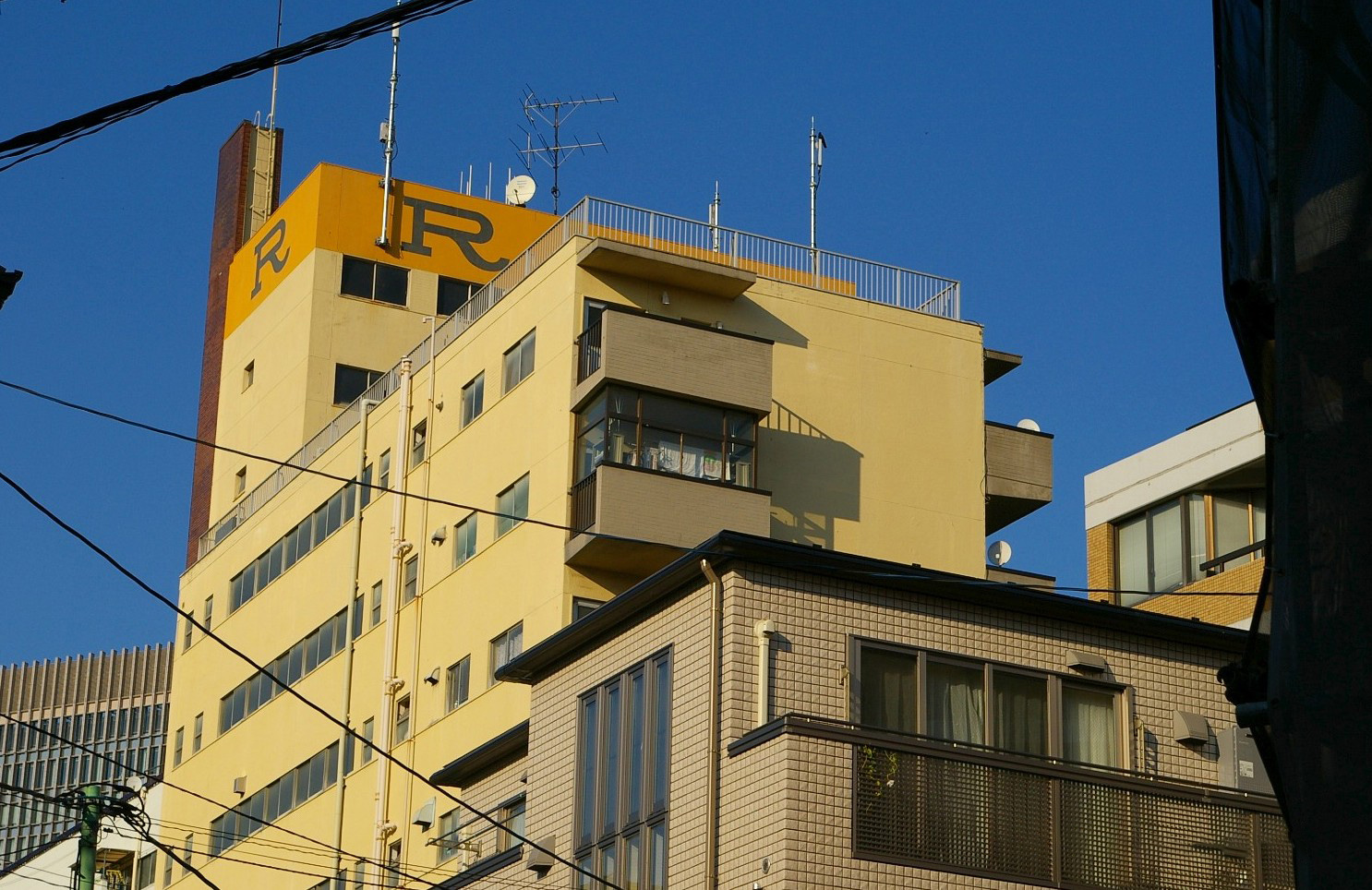
Riki Mansion, home of Rikidōzan

Rikidōzan underwent successful surgery and returned home, but went against doctors orders and resumed drinking alcohol almost as soon as he got home, which caused his condition to deteriorate once again. During this time, Rikidōzan was visited at Riki Mansion by both Murata and Murata's boss, Kunusa Kobayashi, who apologised, bowed his head and accepted responsibility for the incident. Rikidōzan forgave him.

Due to worsening his condition by drinking, Rikidōzan underwent a second successful surgery one week later, but had developed peritonitis and died at about 9:50 pm on December 15, 1963. He was 39 years old.

== Aftermath ==
Rikidōzan's funeral was held on December 20, 1963, in Ikegami Honmonji Temple in Ōta, Tokyo. Numerous figures from the worlds of politics, cinema and sports attended, as well as fans and members of the public, with the number of people reportedly exceeding 12,000 people. It is said that the row of people stretched over 500 meters from the temple all the way to Ikegami train station. Among those in attendance were Rikidōzan's students, Antonio Inoki, Giant Baba and Kintarō Ōki as well as various other opponents from throughout his career.

Katsushi Murata was later found guilty of manslaughter in October 1964, and served eight years in prison before being released in 1972. Murata visited the grave of Rikidōzan every year on December 15 following his release, and also called the sons of Rikidōzan and apologised yearly. In the years following his release, Murata became a high ranking member of the Yakuza. Murata died on April 9, 2013, from natural causes.

Without a top star, Rikidōzan's Japan Pro Wrestling Alliance (JWA) and pro wrestling in Japan as a whole suffered greatly. Despite this, Rikidōzan's two best students Inoki and Baba vowed to keep professional wrestling alive and continued to run JWA into the 1970s. The two eventually left JWA in 1972 and formed their own promotions. Baba formed All Japan Pro Wrestling (AJPW), and Inoki formed New Japan Pro-Wrestling (NJPW). Both promotions remain active to this day.

Rikidōzan's two sons, Yoshihiro Momota and Mitsuo Momota both pursued careers as professional wrestlers, as well as his grandson, Chikara Momota.

== See also ==
- List of premature professional wrestling deaths
