= Japanese Heavyweight Championship =

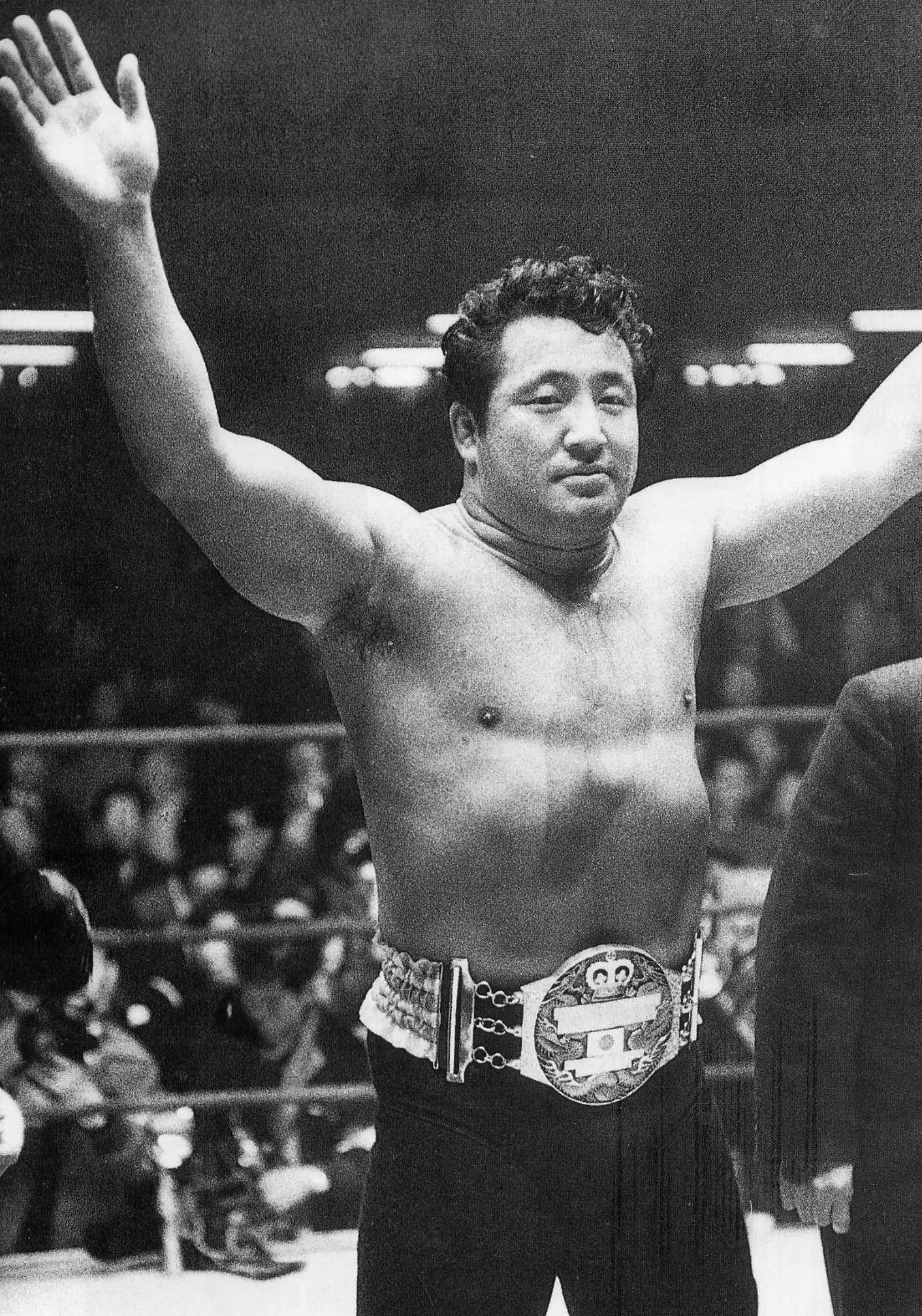
- Rikidōzan with the title belt, 1954

Details
- Promotion: Japan Pro Wrestling Alliance
Statistics
- First champion: Rikidōzan
- Longest reign: Rikidōzan

The Japanese Heavyweight Championship was a professional wrestling championship defended in the Japan Pro Wrestling Alliance. The championship belt was later used by WAR for their J-1 Heavyweight Championship, held by Genichiro Tenryu.

== Title history ==
| Wrestler: | Times: | Date: | Location: | Notes: |
|---|---|---|---|---|
| Rikidōzan | 1 | December 22, 1954 | Tokyo, Japan | Defeats Masahiko Kimura. |
| Title retired | | August 27, 1958 | | Championship vacated when Rikidozan wins the All Asia Heavyweight Championship and later the NWA International Heavyweight Championship. |

== See also ==
- Professional wrestling in Japan
- List of professional wrestling promotions in Japan
