= Junzo Yoshinosato =

Japanese professional wrestler

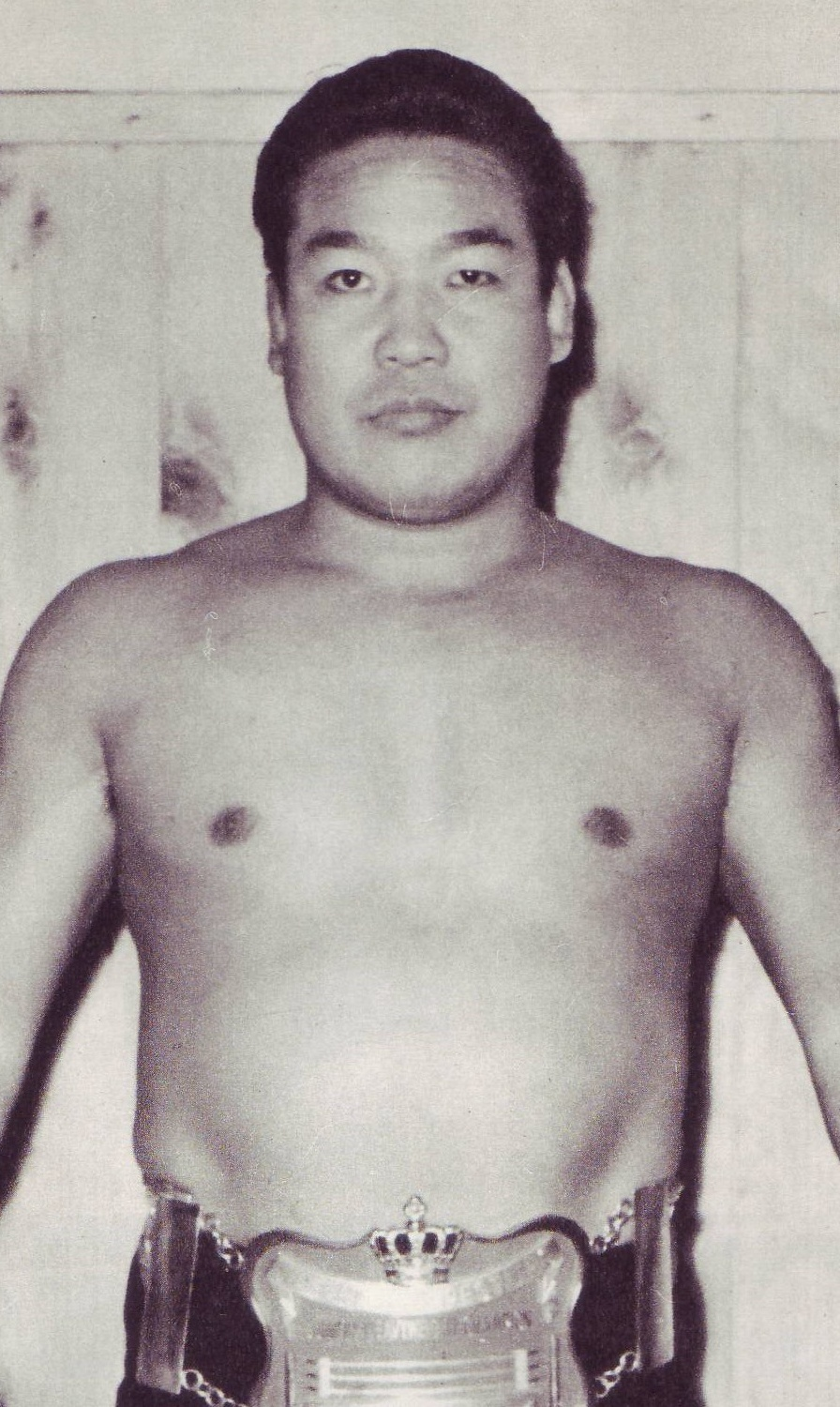
- Yoshinosato in 1962

Personal information
- Born: Junzo Hasegawa; September 27, 1928 Ichinomiya, Chiba, Japan
- Died: September 19, 1999 (aged 70)

Professional wrestling career
- Ring name(s): Devil Sato; Great Sato; Junzo Kamiwaka; Junzo Yoshinosato; Mr. Sato; Sato; Yasuhide Yoshinosato; Yoshinosato; Yoshino Sato
- Billed height: 174 cm (5 ft 9 in)
- Billed weight: 84 kg (185 lb)
- Debut: September 11, 1954; 71 years ago
- Retired: October 10, 1967

Junzo Hasegawa (長谷川 淳三, Hasegawa Junzō) (September 27, 1928 to January 19, 1999) was a Japanese sumo wrestler, professional wrestler, and professional wrestling promoter, better known by the ring name Junzo Yoshinosato (or simply Yoshinosato / Yoshino Sato). He is best known for his involvement with the Japan Pro Wrestling Alliance.

== Sumo career ==
Hasegawa was an all-around athlete from a young age. He pursued a career as a sumo wrestler, joining the Nishonoseki stable under Tamanoumi Daitarō with the help of Kamikaze Shoichi. He made his debut in the January 1944 tournament under the shikona "Hasegawa". He later changed his shikona to "Junzo Kamiwaka", and reached the top division in the January 1950 tournament. In the January 1952 tournament he changed his shikona once again, this time to "Yoshinosato". Despite his relatively small stature, he distinguished himself as a skilled wrestler who employed an underhand throw. He, Kotogahama, and Wakanohana Kanji I were known as the "Three Musketeers of Nishonoseki."

Despite reaching the maegashira rank, Hasegawa became disillusioned with his performance in the rankings and with the internal conflicts in his stable. He did not compete in the September 1954 tournament, and subsequently retired with a career record of 39 wins and 51 losses in the makuuchi division.

== Professional wrestling career ==
On September 10, 1954, Yoshinosato visited his senior from the Nishonoseki stable, Rikidōzan, at the Osaka Prefectural Gymnasium and asked to join Rikidōzan's Japan Pro Wrestling Alliance. He fought his debut match on the same day against Teizo Watanabe - considered the fastest debut in the history of Japanese professional wrestling.

On October 23, 1956, Yoshinosato competed in a tournament at the Osaka Prefectural Gymnasium to establish the inaugural Japanese Light Heavyweight Champion. He defeated Isao Yoshihara (later the president of International Wrestling Enterprise) in the finals. He later vacated the title upon moving into the junior heavyweight division.

Yoshinosato trained Kintarō Ōki, who debuted in 1959.

In 1960, Yoshinosato and Rikidōzan won the All Japan Tag Team Championship. In August 1960, Yoshinosato was awarded the Japanese Junior Heavyweight Championship.

In 1961, Yoshinosato went on an excursion to the United States alongside Giant Baba and Mammoth Suzuki. He performed as a heel, wearing short tights, kneepads, and wooden clogs, and became notorious in the Tennessee area under the ring name "Devil Sato", a gimmick later used by protegé Akihisa Mera. He repeatedly engaged in illegal attacks in the so-called "Tagosaku style", which became a tradition for Japanese heels in the United States. While in Tennessee, he teamed with Taro Sakuro (Filipino wrestler Rey Urbano) to win the Mid-American United States Tag Team Championship; Urbano later adopted the gimmick The Great Kabooki, which was later used with the correct spelling Kabuki, by Mera.

In 1963 Yoshinosato showed up in Mid-Atlantic where he teamed with P.Y. Chung (Tojo Yamamoto).

After Rikidozan's murder in 1963, Yoshinosato - along with Michiaki Yoshimura, Toyonobori, and Kokichi Endo - took over the management of the Japan Pro Wrestling Alliance, with Toyonobori as president. In January 1966, Yoshinosato replaced Toyonobori as president and decreased his ring workload until stopping altogether in October 1967. His last match was on October 10, a loss against Red McNulty.

== Promoting career ==
In addition to serving as JPWA president, he acted as a commentator for the International Pro Wrestling television program International Pro Wrestling Hour, which aired on Tokyo Channel 12.

in 1972, the Japan Pro Wrestling Alliance's top stars, Antonio Inoki and Giant Baba, left to form their own promotions (New Japan Pro-Wrestling and All Japan Pro Wrestling respectively). In 1973, a merger between the Japan Pro Wrestling Alliance and New Japan Pro-Wrestling was proposed, but the deal was rejected by Yoshinosato at the urging of Kintarō Ōki. When the Japan Pro Wrestling Alliance collapsed in April 1973, he told his wife, "If I had been educated, I would not have destroyed the company. I was better suited to being second-in-command than the president, and to discussing the opinions of those above and below." When he finished sorting out the remaining affairs of the Japan Pro Wrestling Alliance, he took home all of the employee badges that were left in the office.

In 1978, All Japan Pro Wrestling held a three-way event featuring wrestlers from All Japan Pro Wrestling, International Wrestling Enterprise, and the Korean Army (Kintarō Ōki faction). Yoshinosato served as the guest referee for a match between Giant Baba and Rusher Kimura. When Baba applied a figure-four leglock to Kimura, Kimura broke the hold by positioning his upper body outside the ring. However, for some reason Yoshinosato did not acknowledge the break, leading Baba to win. This act became known as an infamous example of questionable refereeing in Japanese professional wrestling. In 1996, Yoshinosato became the inaugural chairman of the Rikidōzan Alumni Association & Pro Wrestling (a fraternal organization for former wrestlers).

== Death ==
Hasegawa suffered a cerebral infarction on March 11, 1998. He died of multiple organ failure on January 19, 1999 at the age of 70.

== Professional wrestling style and persona ==
Yoshinosato's finishing move was the small package.

== Championships and accomplishments ==
- Japan Pro Wrestling Alliance
  - All Japan Tag Team Championship (1 time) – with Rikidōzan
  - Japanese Junior Heavyweight Championship (1 time)
  - Japanese Light Heavyweight Championship (1 time)
- NWA Mid-America
  - NWA United States Junior Heavyweight Championship (Mid-America version) (1 time)
  - NWA United States Tag Team Championship (Mid-America version) (1 time) – with Taro Sakuro
