= Professional wrestling in Japan =

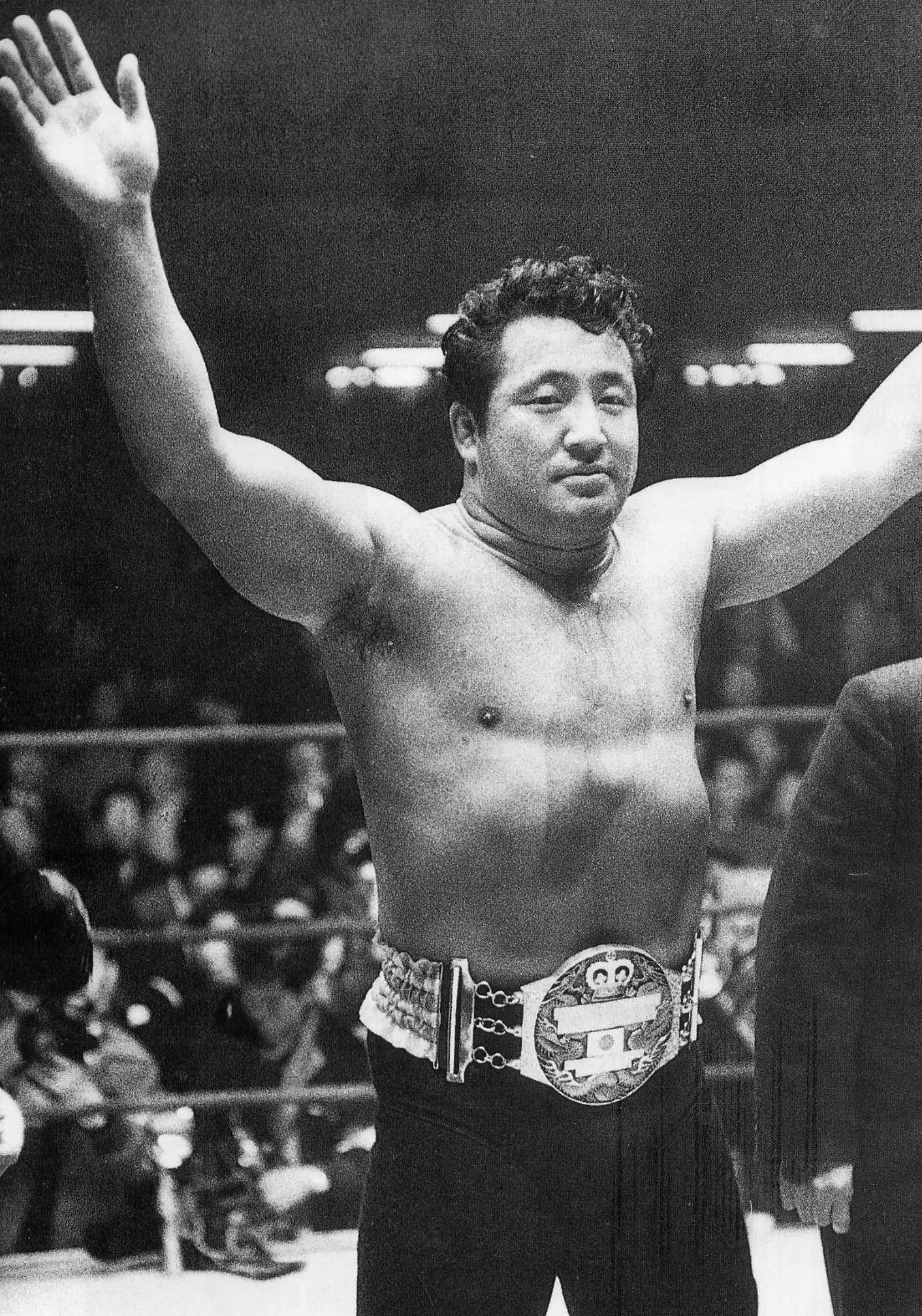
Rikidōzan is widely credited with kickstarting the popularity of professional wrestling in Japan following World War II.

Professional wrestling in Japan has existed for several decades. The first Japanese person to involve themselves in catch wrestling (the basis of traditional professional wrestling) was former sumo wrestler Sorakichi Matsuda. There were subsequent attempts before and after World War II to popularize the sport in Japan, but these generally failed until the advent of its first big star, Rikidōzan, in 1951, who became known as the "father" of the sport. Rikidōzan brought the sport to tremendous popularity with his Japanese Wrestling Association (JWA) until his murder in 1963. Following his death, professional wrestling thrived, creating a variety of personalities, promotions and styles. It has also created a mass of other cultural icons in Japan including: Antonio Inoki, Giant Baba, Jyushin "Thunder" Liger, Tiger Mask, Keiji Mutoh/The Great Muta, Mitsuharu Misawa, and Kenta Kobashi among others. Throughout the years, several promotions have opened and closed, but a few have persisted to remain the most popular and thriving companies: New Japan Pro-Wrestling is currently considered by many as the top promotion.

== Professional wrestling style ==
Puroresu is the predominant style of professional wrestling that has developed in Japan. The term comes from the Japanese pronunciation of "professional wrestling", which is shortened to puroresu. The term became popular among English-speaking fans due to Hisaharu Tanabe's activities in the online Usenet community. Growing out of origins in the traditional US style of wrestling, it has become an entity in itself. Japanese pro wrestling is distinct in its psychology and presentation of the sport; with fewer theatrics; the stories told in Japanese matches are primarily about a fighter's spirit and perseverance.

== Professional wrestling on television ==
Since its beginning, Japanese professional wrestling depended on television to reach a wide audience. Rikidōzan's matches in the 1950s, televised by Nippon TV, often attracted huge crowds to Tokyo giant screens. Eventually TV Asahi also gained the right to broadcast JWA, but eventually the two major broadcasters agreed to split the talent, centering about Rikidōzan's top two students: NTV for Giant Baba and his group, and Asahi for Antonio Inoki and his group. This arrangement continued after the JWA split into today's major promotions, New Japan and All Japan, led by Inoki and Baba respectively. In 2000, following the Pro Wrestling Noah split, NTV decided to follow the new venture rather than staying with All Japan. Nowadays, however, mirroring the decline that professional wrestling in the U.S. had in the 1970s and early 1980s, NOAH's Power Hour and New Japan's World Pro Wrestling have been largely relegated to the midnight hours by their broadcasters.

The advent of cable television and pay per view also enabled independents such as RINGS to rise. WOWOW had a working agreement with Akira Maeda that paid millions to RINGS when he was featured, but eventually was scrapped with Maeda's retirement and the subsequent RINGS collapse.

In 2009, due to the bearish global economy, NTV cancelled all wrestling programming, including NOAH's Power Hour (lesser affiliates still air large cards), marking the end of a tradition going back to Rikidōzan.

Since 2014, various New Japan Pro-Wrestling live specials have been broadcast on AXS TV in the United States.

== Relations with professional wrestling beyond Japan ==
=== Foreigners in Japanese circuits ===
Since its establishment, professional wrestling in Japan heavily incorporated foreigners (called gaijin) particularly North Americans to help popularise native talent. Rikidōzan's JWA and its successor promotions All Japan Pro Wrestling and New Japan Pro-Wrestling were members of the American-based National Wrestling Alliance at various points, and used these connections to bring North American stars. International Pro Wrestling was the first Japanese promotion to link into European circuits. It was through IWE that Frenchman André the Giant got his international reputation for the first time.

In recent years, many of North America's most popular wrestlers, such as Sting, Hulk Hogan, Bret Hart, Dynamite Kid, Big Van Vader, Mick Foley, Eddie Guerrero, Chris Jericho, Kurt Angle, Rob Van Dam, Sabu, Mil Máscaras, El Canek, Dos Caras, El Solitario, Samoa Joe, AJ Styles, Bryan Danielson, CM Punk, Travis Tomko, Giant Bernard, Bill Goldberg, Chris Sabin, Low Ki, Brock Lesnar, Davey Richards, Chris Hero, and others have wrestled in Japan, whereas others such as Stan Hansen, "Dr. Death" Steve Williams and Kenny Omega spent much of their careers in Japan and thus are (or have been) better known there than in their homeland. (Omega has since become more recognized in both his homeland of Canada and the US through his involvement with All Elite Wrestling.) Even in joshi puroresu, a few notable foreigners have found success wrestling for joshi promotions, such as Monster Ripper, Madusa, Reggie Bennett, and Amazing Kong. The now defunct World Championship Wrestling had a strong talent exchange deal with New Japan, Ken Shamrock was among the first Americans to compete in shoot style competition in Japan, starting out in the UWF and later opened Pancrase with some other Japanese shootfighters.

As a result of the introduction of lucha libre into Japan, major Mexican wrestlers also compete in the country. The most popular Mexican wrestler to compete in Japan is Mil Máscaras, who is credited with introducing the high-flying moves to Japanese audiences, which then led to the style called lucha-resu, later embodied by Tiger Mask.

Foreign wrestlers from diverse backgrounds have earned huge followings, sometimes greater than those of Japanese top rosters in respective Japanese promotions they have wrestled in. American Stan Hansen, Indian Tiger Jeet Singh, Canadian Abdullah the Butcher, and British wrestler Dynamite Kid were among those cited as top foreign grapplers in a poll of Japanese fans:

Impressive "Gaijin" Wrestler Ranking
Rank	Wrestlers
1	(United States) Stan Hansen
2	(United States) Bruiser Brody
3	(Canada) Abdullah the Butcher
4	(United States) The Destroyer
5	(Mexico) Mil Máscaras
6	(United States) Hulk Hogan
7	(France) André the Giant
8	(India) (Canada) Tiger Jeet Singh
9	(United States) Terry Funk
10	(United States) The Road Warriors

=== Japanese stars abroad ===
All Japan Pro Wrestling and New Japan Pro-Wrestling, as well as others, have also sent wrestlers to compete in the likes of the United States, Mexico, the United Kingdom, Puerto Rico and so on. Usually, these talent exchanges are chances for puroresu stars to learn other styles to add to their own strengths, a tradition that started with Rikidozan himself between 1951 and 1953. Some of the more famous examples of these exchanges are Hakushi in WWF, Masahiro Chono, The Great Muta and Jyushin Thunder Liger in WCW, as well as ECW which featured talent such as Hayabusa from Frontier Martial-Arts Wrestling and The Great Sasuke of Michinoku Pro Wrestling.

Before the advent of cable television some Japanese wrestlers in the U.S. adopted names that often were inconsistent and often portrayed by more than one Japanese wrestler, such as "Tokyo Joe" (Katsuji Adachi, Koji "Thunder" Sugiyama and Tetsunosuke Daigo), "Mr. Sato" (Junzo Yoshinosato, Akio Sato and Akihisa Mera) and "Great Togo" (Kazuo Okamura and Haruka Eigen). Some names and gimmicks of North American origin stuck to the wrestler and defined his in-ring personality permanently, such as Hiro Matsuda, Killer Khan, Great Kabuki, Great Muta, Mr. Hito, and Mr. Pogo. Japanese wrestlers sent to Mexico, where the wrestling mask was the rule, adopted mask-based personae; examples were Osamu Matsuda becoming El Samurai, Yoshihiro Asai becoming Último Dragón, and Masanori Murakawa becoming Great Sasuke. Despite the advent of cable television and the Internet, some Japanese wrestlers still adopt all-new ring names, particularly when they join WWE, which trademarks ring names frequently. Recent examples include Mitsuhide Hirasawa as Hideo Saito, Naofumi Yamamoto as Yoshi Tatsu, Kana as Asuka, Kaori Housako as Kairi Sane, and Kenta Kobayashi as Hideo Itami. A recent counter-example is Shinsuke Nakamura, who continues to perform under his birth name in WWE. Japanese wrestlers who appear in other American circuits such as Impact Wrestling (originally Total Nonstop Action Wrestling, or TNA) and Ring of Honor rarely change their names.

Some joshi stars from AJW had wrestled for the World Wrestling Federation in the 1980s and 1990s, with The Jumping Bomb Angels and Bull Nakano known for being particularly successful.

Gaea Japan once had a working agreement with World Championship Wrestling in the mid-1990s, when the latter brought in wrestlers from Gaea to bolster the ranks of their then-fledgling women's division, with Akira Hokuto becoming the first and only WCW Women's Champion, and a WCW Women's Cruiserweight Championship was even introduced and defended in Gaea shows.

Recent examples of Japanese wrestlers working in foreign promotions include Satoshi Kojima in Major League Wrestling, Kenta Kobashi, Go Shiozaki, Takeshi Morishima, and Kenta in Ring of Honor, Hirooki Goto, Masato Yoshino, Tiger Mask IV, Hiroshi Tanahashi, Kazuchika Okada, Seiya Sanada, and Ayako Hamada in TNA/Impact, Aja Kong, Dick Togo, Great Sasuke, Jinsei Shinzaki, Kaori Yoneyama, Manami Toyota and Mayumi Ozaki in Chikara, Hideo Itami, Yoshi Tatsu, Kenzo Suzuki, Taka Michinoku, Asuka, Shinsuke Nakamura and Kairi Sane in WWE, and Ayumi Kurihara, Hiroyo Matsumoto and Tomoka Nakagawa in Shimmer Women Athletes. Riho and Hikaru Shida have both become AEW Women's World Champion.

== See also ==
- List of professional wrestling attendance records in Japan
- List of professional wrestling promotions in Japan
