= World Tag League =

The World Tag League may refer to any of the following professional wrestling tournaments held in Japan:

- World Tag League (JWA), 1970 to 1972, hosted by Japanese Wrestling Association
- World Tag League (NJPW), annually since 1991, hosted by New Japan Pro Wrestling
- World's Strongest Tag Determination League, annually since 1977, hosted by All Japan Pro Wrestling

== See also ==
- Puroresu
