= Kintarō Ōki =

Zainichi Korean wrestler (1929–2006)

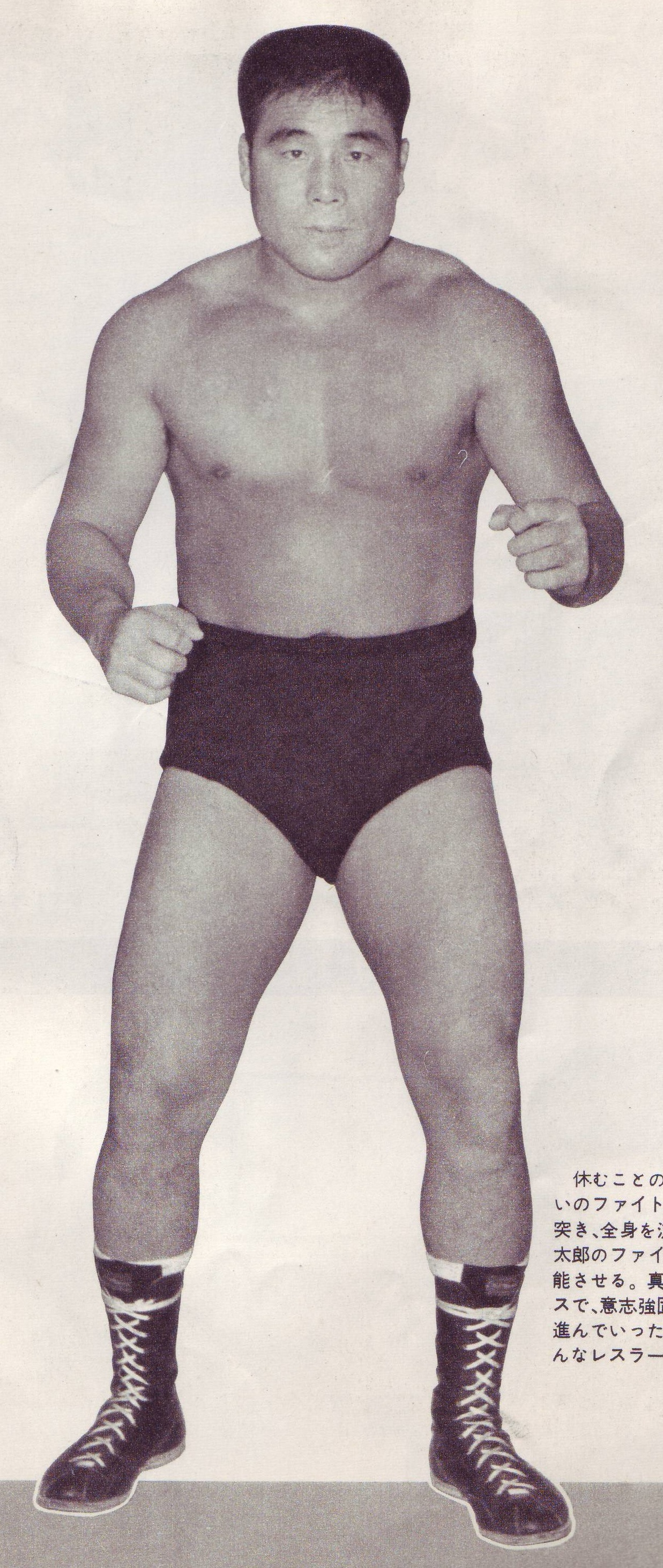
- Kintarō Ōki in 1962

Personal information
- Born: Kim Tae-sik; February 24, 1929 Goheung, Zenranan-dō (South Jeolla Province), Korea, Empire of Japan
- Died: October 26, 2006 (aged 77) Seoul, South Korea

Professional wrestling career
- Ring name(s): Kim Il; Kintarō Kongo; Kintarō Ōki; Tetsurō Sato
- Billed height: 185 cm (6 ft 1 in)
- Billed weight: 120 kg (265 lb)
- Trained by: Rikidōzan; Mr. Moto; Yoshino Sato
- Debut: November 1959
- Retired: 1982

Kim Tae-sik (February 24, 1929 – October 26, 2006), better known by the ring names Kintarō Ōki (Japanese: 大木金太郎, romanized: Ohki Kintaroh, lit. 'Golden boy ohki') and Kim Il (Korean: 김일; Hanja: 金一), was a Korean and Japanese professional wrestler and ssireum-kkun. His professional wrestling career spanned from the late-1950s to the early-1980s.

== Professional wrestling career ==
Kim was originally a Ssireum player, but he had hopes of becoming a student of fellow Korean wrestler Rikidōzan, who had emigrated to Japan in 1940. He entered Japan illegally in 1958 to do so, but was arrested in 1959. After being released he was able to train with Rikidōzan and joined the Japan Wrestling Association (JWA). Kim debuted in November 1959 under the ring name "Kintarō Ōki". His name was not meant come off as relative to head referee Shikina Ōki; however, the name itself was chosen by Rikidōzan. On September 30, 1960, Ōki defeated fellow rookie Kanji Inoki (later Antonio Inoki), who was making his debut along with Shohei Baba (later Giant Baba). Ōki, Baba and Inoki were a rookie trio groomed to become the eventual successors to Rikidōzan himself. Ohki was also trained by Mr. Moto and Yoshino Sato.

Upon Rikidōzan's murder in 1963, Ōki returned to his homeland to raise the profile of professional wrestling there. In 1964 and 1965 he went to Texas, where he competed for Big Time Wrestling in Dallas, and for Dory Funk's Western States Sports promotion in Amarillo as "Tetsurō Sato". He'd return to Amarillo in 1970 under the ring name "Kim Il", along with another Dallas tour. In 1964, Ōki faced NWA World Heavyweight Champion Lou Thesz in what turned into a legitimate shoot contest. Originally scheduled for three falls, Ōki shot on Thesz in the first round. Ōki's move to shoot on Thesz ended things fast, as Thesz wounded him to the point that Ōki was stretchered off.

After a brief JWA return in 1964 as "Kintarō Kongo", Ōki returned to the JWA when Toyonobori and Inoki left the promotion, though he returned the next year. In 1967, Ōki became the top star in Korea with his defeat of Mark Lewin to win the Worldwide Wrestling Associates World Heavyweight Championship. With this, the JWA wanted to rename him to "Rikidōzan" as tribute and succession, but the plan never went through. Ōki trained Kim Duk, who debuted in 1968; they went on to team together, winning the NWA International Tag Team Championship twice and several awards.

Inoki and Baba left the JWA in 1972 to found New Japan Pro-Wrestling and All Japan Pro Wrestling respectively in 1972, letting Ōki become the JWA's top star, winning the NWA International Heavyweight Championship. In April 1973, the JWA closed and was absorbed into All Japan Pro Wrestling, and though Ōki competed for the new organization for a time he wrestled mostly as a freelancer in Japan and a main event star in South Korea, famously wrestling against his former fellow rookies Inoki and Baba in 1974 and 1975. He defended the NWA International Heavyweight Championship in International Wrestling Enterprise and South Korea until ordered by the NWA to vacate it in 1981.

Following then, Ōki did not compete much, with his official retirement card on April 2, 1995 to be held at a Weekly Pro-Wrestling magazine sponsored show at the Tokyo Dome. Lou Thesz assisted Ōki at this, his last public appearance in Japan; Ōki was in a wheelchair at this time. During his career Ōki also held the Far East Heavyweight Championship, All Asia Heavyweight Championship, and All Asia Tag Team Championship four times each, the NWA Texas Tag Team Championship four times, and the NWA International Tag Team Championship four times.

== Death ==
Ōki died in the Eulji General Hospital in Seoul on October 26, 2006, of a heart attack brought on by chronic kidney disease and kidney failure. In 2020, he was reburied in the Daejeon National Cemetery with the approval of the Ministry of Patriots and Veterans Affairs.

== Professional wrestling style and persona ==
Ōki's finishing moves were a headbutt and a figure-four leglock.

== Championships and accomplishments ==
- All Japan Pro Wrestling
  - All Asia Heavyweight Championship (2 times)
  - NWA International Tag Team Championship (2 times) - with Kim Duk
  - Champion Carnival Fighting Spirit Award (1976)
  - World's Strongest Tag Determination Fair Play Award (1977) – with Kim Duk
  - World's Strongest Tag Determination Effort Award (1978) – with Kim Duk
  - World's Strongest Tag Determination Team Play Award (1979) – with Kim Duk
- Japan Wrestling Association
  - All Asia Heavyweight Championship (2 times)
  - All Asia Tag Team Championship (4 times) – with Michiaki Yoshimura (3 times) and Antonio Inoki (1 time)
  - NWA International Heavyweight Championship (1 time)
  - NWA International Tag Team Championship (2 times) – Seiji Sakaguchi (1 time) and Umanosuke Ueda (1 time)
- Korean Wrestling Association
  - Far East Heavyweight Championship (1 time)
- NWA Big Time Wrestling
  - NWA Texas Tag Team Championship (1 time) – with Pak Song
- Tokyo Sports
  - Fighting Spirit Award (1975)
  - Service Award (2006)
- Western States Sports
  - NWA Western States Tag Team Championship (1 time) - with Pak Song
- Worldwide Wrestling Associates
  - WWA World Heavyweight Championship (1 time)
  - WWA World Tag Team Championship (1 time) – with Mr. Moto
  - WWA International Television Tag Team Championship (1 time) – with Mr. Moto
- Wrestling Observer Newsletter
  - Wrestling Observer Newsletter Hall of Fame (Class of 1996)
- Korean Sport & Olympic Committee
  - Korean Sports Hall of Fame (2018)
