= Mitsuo Momota =

Japanese professional wrestler

Personal information
- Born: September 21, 1948 (age 77) Tokyo, Japan

Professional wrestling career
- Ring name(s): Mitsuo Momota; Rikidōzan Jr. Man of 6:30
- Billed height: 1.73 m (5 ft 8 in)
- Billed weight: 100 kg (220 lb)
- Trained by: Shohei Baba
- Debut: May 27, 1970
- Retired: October 24, 2020

Mitsuo Momota (百田 光雄, Momota Mitsuo) (born September 21, 1948) is a semi-retired Japanese professional wrestler and executive, known for his work in the Japanese promotions All Japan Pro Wrestling and later in Pro Wrestling NOAH. He is the son of wrestler Rikidōzan.

== Professional wrestling career ==
=== Japan Wrestling Association (1970–1972) ===
Momota debuted on May 27, 1970 for the JWA, the promotion that was founded by his father Rikidozan, the father of Puroresu. His first match was a six man battle royal which he lost to Ushinosuke Hayashi. After competing here and there over the next few months, he scored his first win on December 4 when he won a ten man battle royal last defeating Hayashi. Momota would continue to work for the JWA throughout 1971 mostly low on the card and paying his dues during which time he faced the likes of Akio Sato and future legends Osamu Kido and Tatsumi Fujinami. His last match would be on December 12 scoring a win over Masashi Ozawa (the future Killer Khan).

=== Mexico and North America (1974–1975) ===
In 1974 he showed up in Mexico's Empresa Mexicana de Lucha Libre as Rikidozan Jr., and learned the Tope Suicida maneuver, putting it into practice in Japan long before Gran Hamada from the rival New Japan Pro-Wrestling became the first Japanese wrestler to use Lucha-inspired aerial maneuvers regularly in his matches. A year later, he briefly wrestled for the Funks Western States Sports promotion.

=== All Japan Pro Wrestling (1972–2000) ===
In 1972, Momota helped establish All Japan Pro Wrestling. Despite this and being the son of Rikidozan, Momota never enjoyed much success as a wrestler as he spent the majority of his career in opening matches and working with young talent. His debut would be the second match in All Japan history defeating Goro Tsurumi at All Japan's debut show on October 21, 1972. On January 2, 1976, Momota won his first honor when he won the yearly January 2 Korakuen Hall Battle Royal. In 1983, Momota then took part in the Lou Thesz Cup tournament placing fourth place

His first title victory came on April 20, 1989 where he won the World Junior Heavyweight Championship defeating Shinichi Nakano. He would hold the title for over 2 months successfully defended it 2 times against Johnny Smith and Isamu Teranishi before losing it to Joe Malenko on July 1, 1989. After losing the title, Momota returned to opening matches and by the 1990s, his role began to change as he began wrestling mostly in comedic tag matches with fellow aging wrestlers mostly Haruka Eigen. Behind the scenes, Momota made a bigger impact behind the scenes as a co-Vice President and member of the All Japan directory. After numerous years on the All Japan Pro Wrestling roster, he left in 2000 to join Pro Wrestling Noah.

=== Pro Wrestling Noah (2000–2009) ===
In June 2000, Momota, along with the majority of the All Japan roster resigned and joined Mitsuharu Misawa's new promotion: Pro Wrestling Noah, in Noah, Momota was appointed vice president of the company. Despite being in a new promotion, his spot on the card was the same. Like All Japan, Momota spent his time in NOAH in opening matches or low on the card wrestling against young up and comers and fellow aging wrestlers. Despite this Momota was given several title shots at various titles. His first title shot was for the GHC Junior Heavyweight Tag Team Championship on December 11, 2003 when he teamed with Tsuyoshi Kikuchi to challenge Naomichi Marufuji and Kenta but failed to win the titles. His next title shot was on February 15, 2004 when he challenged New Japan legend Jyushin Thunder Liger for the GHC Junior Heavyweight Championship hoping to bring the title back to NOAH but he came up short. His last title shot was exactly 4 years later on February 15, 2008, when he challenged Kishin Kawabata for the GHC Openweight Hardcore Championship but despite another good effort, he would come short again. Following the death of Mitsuharu Misawa on June 13, 2009, Momota would finish the tour and resigned from NOAH as both wrestler and vice president in June 2009.

=== Freelancer (2009–2021, 2024) ===
After leaving NOAH, Momota began wrestling in the independents specifically for Genichiro Tenryu's new Tenryu Project. On June 9, 2010, Momota teamed with Tenryu and Koki Kitahara to face Yoshihiro Takayama, Tatsutoshi Goto, & Daisuke Sekimoto in a decision match for the Tenryu Project Six Man Tag Team Championship but lost. On July 15, 2015, Momota and his son Chikara defeated Hikaru Sato and Masaaki Mochizuki to win the Tokyo Intercontinental Tag Team Championship, his first title in 26 years. They lost the title to Kikutaro and Stalker Ichikawa on December 1. On January 3, 2016, Momota won Freedoms' Lottery One Day Six Man Tag Team Tournament teaming with Takashi Sasaki and Toru Suguira. On August 11, 2018, Momota entered DDT's Ganbare Climax 2018 tournament but lost in the first round to Shota. On September 1, Momota returned to Noah for the first time in nine years participating at Naomichi Marufuji's 20th Anniversary show where he teamed with Tsuyoshi Kikuchi against Mohammed Yone and Junta Miyawaki but lost. On January 3, 2019, Momota teamed with Chikara in Freedoms' King of Freedoms Tag Team Title One Day Tournament but lost in the first round to Gentaro and Takashi Sasaki. On February 7, Momota returned to All Japan for the first time in nineteen years for Masanobu Fuchi's 45th Memorial Match Vol. 1 Special match teaming with Jun Akiyama and Ultimo Dragon to defeat Fuchi, Takao Omori, and Osamu Nishimura. On February 19, 2019, Momota won a battle royal at the Giant Baba Death 20th Memorial Box Office ~ Abdullah the Butcher Retirement Memorial. In 2021 while undergoing tests for cataract surgery it was discovered that Momota had terminal stage 4 lung cancer. In 2024 he was scheduled to make his in-ring return teaming with his son against Tiger Toguchi and Yuichi Taniguchi for Frontier Martial-Arts Wrestling-Explosion at their Kawasaki Legend 2024 event, however he was replaced by Masahiko Takasugi.

== Personal life ==
Momota is the son of Wrestling legend and the Father of Puroresu: Rikidozan. He also had an older brother: Yoshihiro Momota. Like his brother, Yoshihiro also was a wrestler but found little success. He found bigger success behind the scenes as served on All Japan Pro Wrestling and later Pro Wrestling Noah's board of directors. Yoshihiro died in 2000 at age 54. Momota has a son named Chikara, who made his professional wrestling debut on December 16, 2013.

== Championships and accomplishments ==
- All Japan Pro Wrestling
  - World Junior Heavyweight Championship (1 time)
  - January 2 Korakuen Hall Battle Royal Winner (1976)
  - Giant Baba Memorial Battle Royal (2019)
- Pro Wrestling Freedoms
  - One Day 6-Man Tag Tournament (2016) – with Takashi Sasaki and Toru Sugiura
- Tokyo Gurentai
  - Tokyo Intercontinental Tag Team Championship (1 time) – with Chikara
