= Japan Pro Wrestling Alliance =

Japanese professional wrestling promotion

Nihon Puroresu Kyōkai Japan Pro Wrestling Alliance
- Acronym: JWA
- Founded: July 30, 1953
- Defunct: April 14, 1973
- Style: Puroresu
- Headquarters: Japan
- Founder: Rikidōzan
- Owners: Rikidōzan (1953–1963); Michiharu Sadano (1964–1966); Junzo Yoshinosato (1966–1973)
- Successor: All Japan Pro Wrestling; New Japan Pro-Wrestling

The Japan Pro Wrestling Alliance (日本プロレス協会, Nihon Puroresu Kyōkai), also known as the Japan Pro Wrestling Association and the Japanese Wrestling Association (JWA), was the first professional wrestling promotion to be based in Japan. It operated from 1953 to 1973.

== History ==
=== JWA under Rikidōzan (1953–1963) ===
Rikidōzan, a former rikishi (sumo wrestling practitioner) who had debuted as a Western-style professional wrestler in 1951, decided in 1953 to establish a territory that would represent the National Wrestling Alliance in Japan. Patronages and board members were consisted mostly of Yoshio Kodama and his acquaintances, such as Hisayuki Machii, Kazuo Taoka, Sadao Nagata, Shinsaku Arata, Sadamasa Sakai, Kichitaro Hagiwara, Hirotaka Hayashi, Sadao Oasa, Kozo Ota, Tsunenohana Kan'ichi, Masaichi Nagata, Banboku Ōno, Shojiro Kawashima, Etsusaburo Shiina, and so on. Kawashima, a former police bureaucracy, concerned adhesions between political circles and yakuza and entertainment industries, and later negotiated with Rikidōzan's wife Keiko Tanaka (jp) to exile Machii and Taoka.

In those early days, Japanese professional wrestlers came from out of the sumo or judo ranks; former sumotori usually used their shikona (Rikidōzan, Azumafuji, Toyonobori, etc.) while former judokas usually used their real names or modifications of them (Masahiko Kimura, Michiaki Yoshimura, etc.) Rikidōzan pushed himself as the top star of the promotion, first battling other Japanese wrestlers such as Kimura and Toshio Yamaguchi, but found a strong niche in feuds with American wrestlers such as Lou Thesz, The Destroyer and Bobo Brazil. In 1957 he defeated Thesz to win the title that would be the JWA's top title thereafter, the NWA International Heavyweight Championship. As a newly found hero to the war-weary Japanese masses, Rikidōzan expanded into several business ventures. It resulted in his murder at the hands of a gangster in 1963, at the peak of his fame.

=== JWA after Rikidōzan (1963–1973) ===
After Rikidōzan's death in 1963, he was replaced as president by Michiharu Sadano, who wrestled as Toyonobori. In 1966, Sadano was replaced by Junzo Yoshinosato.

The company continued to operate as the nation's premier (and only male) wrestling circuit until challenged in the late 1960s by International Wrestling Enterprise, which featured the first major World heavyweight championship based in Japan, the IWA title. The JWA's top stars, Giant Baba and Antonio Inoki left to form their own promotions (All Japan Pro Wrestling and New Japan Pro-Wrestling, respectively) in 1972. With its top drawing cards gone, the JWA was therefore out of business the following year.

== Championships ==
- Japanese Heavyweight Championship
- Japanese Junior Heavyweight Championship
- Japanese Light Heavyweight Championship
- All Japan Tag Team Championship
- All Asia Heavyweight Championship (later revived by AJPW and Pro Wrestling Land's End)
- All Asia Tag Team Championship (later revived by AJPW)
- NWA International Heavyweight Championship (later revived by AJPW)
- NWA International Tag Team Championship (later revived by AJPW)
- NWA United National Championship (later revived by AJPW)
- PWA Champion's Grail (1962 Toyonaka trophy; later revived by Maple Leaf Pro Wrestling)

== Annual tournaments ==
=== World Big League ===
World Big League (ワールド大リーグ戦, wārudo dai rīgu-sen), later renamed to simply World League (ワールドリーグ戦, wārudo rīgu-sen) was a professional wrestling tournament annually held by Japanese Wrestling Association from 1959 till 1972. The 1973 edition was not held as JWA folded that year.

Wrestlers from all over the world participated in the various editions of the tournament, as it was meant since its beginning to be a world tournament. It had been one of the most important pro-wrestling tournaments of its time, because it was one of the very few (and for some years after its creation the only) pro-wrestling tournament of its time to be considered representative of the entire pro-wrestling world.

In 1970, JWA created a tag team counterpart of the World League, known as World Tag League.

Its prestige led Antonio Inoki and Giant Baba to create their own respective promotions, New Japan Pro-Wrestling and All Japan Pro Wrestling, tournaments which were presented as the direct followers to the JWA World League. Therefore, respectively, the G1 Climax for the NJPW and the Champion Carnival for the AJPW are considered the direct descendants of the original World League.

The following is a list of the winners of each edition:

- 1st World Big League (1959): Rikidozan by defeating Jess Ortega.
- 2nd World Big League (1960): Rikidozan(2) by defeating Leo Nomellini.
- 3rd World Big League (1961): Rikidozan(3) by defeating Mr. X.
- 4th World Big League (1962): Rikidozan(4) by defeating Lou Thesz.
- 5th World Big League (1963): Rikidozan(5) by defeating Killer Kowalski.
- 6th World League (1964): Toyonobori by defeating Gene Kiniski.
- 7th World League (1965): Toyonobori(2) by defeating Fred Blassie.
- 8th World League (1966): Giant Baba by defeating Wilbur Snyder.
- 9th World League (1967): Giant Baba(2) by defeating The Destroyer.
- 10th World League (1968): Giant Baba(3) by defeating Killer Kowalski.
- 11th World League (1969): Antonio Inoki by defeating Chris Markoff.
- 12th World League (1970): Giant Baba(4) by defeating Don Leo Jonathan.
- 13th World League (1971): Giant Baba(5) by defeating Abdullah the Butcher.
- 14th World League (1972): Giant Baba(6) by defeating Gorilla Monsoon.

=== World Tag League ===
NWA Tag League (NWAタッグ・リーグ戦, NWA taggu rīgu-sen), also called World Tag League, was a professional wrestling tournament annually held by Japanese Wrestling Association from 1970 till 1972. The 1973 edition was not held as JWA folded that year. Wrestlers from all over the world participated in the various editions of the tournament, as it was meant to be a world tournament. It was created in 1970 as the tag team counterpart of World Big League.

Its prestige led Antonio Inoki and Giant Baba to create in their respective promotions, New Japan Pro-Wrestling and All Japan Pro Wrestling, tournaments which were presented as the direct followers to the JWA World Tag League. Therefore, respectively, the G1 Tag League for the NJPW and the World's Strongest Tag Determination League for the AJPW are the indirect descendant of the original World Tag League. In fact, in 2012, NJPW renamed the G1 Tag League the World Tag League.

The following is a list of the winners of each edition:

- 1st NWA Tag League (1970): Antonio Inoki and Kantaro Hoshino by defeating Nick Bockwinkel and John Quinn.
- 2nd NWA Tag League (1971): Antonio Inoki (2) and Seiji Sakaguchi by defeating Killer Kowalski and Buddy Austin.
- 3rd NWA Tag League (1972): Seiji Sakaguchi (2) and Akihisa Takachiho by defeating Larry Hamilton and Joe Hamilton.

== Legacy ==
In 2024, the revival of Maple Leaf Pro Wrestling led by Scott D'Amore established the PWA Champions Grail, a new championship merging the lineage of Rikidozan and Toyonobori's 1962 Toyonaka trophy with the Wrestling Retribution Project trophy won by Kenny Omega in Hollywood in 2011.

== Alumni ==
This is not an exhaustive list, as the JWA was the only Japanese promotion until 1966 and many wrestlers, both Japanese who competed for a brief time and then retired, or foreigners who came for a single tour, were booked.

Japanese

- Rikidōzan
- Masahiko Kimura
- Azumafuji
- Surugaumi
- Toshio Yamaguchi
- Toyonobori
- Michiaki Yoshimura
- Joe Higuchi
- Yoshinosato
- Kokichi Endo
- Isao Yoshiwara
- Yasuhiro Kojima
- Kintarō Ōki
- Shohei "Giant" Baba
- Kanji "Antonio" Inoki
- Umanosuke Ueda
- Atsuhide/Kakutaro/Masio Koma
- Katsuhisa Shibata
- Mitsu Hirai
- Kantaro Hoshino
- Kotetsu Yamamoto
- Motoshi Ohkuma
- Raizō Kojika
- Masao Kimura
- Haruka Eigen
- Seiji Sakaguchi
- Masanori Saito
- Katsuji Adachi
- Akihisa Takachiho
- Kazuo Sakurada
- Masanori Toguchi
- Masashi Ozawa
- Osamu Kido
- Tatsumi Fujinami
- Akio Sato
- Kengo Kimura
- Mitsuo Hata
- Mitsuo Momota
- Masao Itoh

Foreigners

- Lou Thesz - first NWA World Heavyweight Champion to defend the title in Japan
- King Kong Czaya
- Tiger Joginder Singh
- Dara Singh
- Freddie Blassie
- Yusuf Turk (Yusuf Omar)
- The Destroyer
- Bobo Brazil
- The Sheik
- Bill Dromo
- Fritz Von Erich
- Gene Kiniski
- Bruno Sammartino
- Dory Funk, Jr.
- Terry Funk
- Abdullah the Butcher
- Mil Máscaras
- Crusher Lisowski
- Dick the Bruiser
- Wilbur Snyder
- Danny Hodge
- Karl Gotch
- Johnny Valentine
- Harley Race
- Fritz von Goering
- Bob Roop
- Mike Sharpe Sr.
- Ben Sharpe
- Bobby Bruns
- Harold Sakata

== See also ==
- Professional wrestling in Japan
- List of professional wrestling promotions in Japan
