= Kim Duk =

Zainichi Korean wrestler (born 1948)

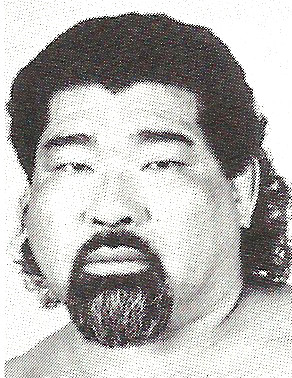
- Toguchi, c. 1988
- Born: Pyo Jeong-deok; February 7, 1948 (age 78); Tokyo, Japan
- Citizenship: Japan
- Professional wrestling career
- Ring names: Kim Duk; Masanori Toguchi; Tiger Chung Lee; Tiger Toguchi; Ultra Seven; Yamato
- Billed height: 1.93 m (6 ft 4 in)
- Billed weight: 131 kg (289 lb)
- Billed from: Seoul, South Korea
- Trained by: Karl Gotch; Kintarō Ōki; Dory Funk, Jr.
- Debut: August 30, 1968
- Retired: August 24, 2024

Japanese name
- Kanji: 戸口 正徳
- Hiragana: とぐち まさのり
- Katakana: トグチ マサノリ
Transcriptions
- Romanization: Toguchi Masanori

Korean name
- Hangul: 표정덕
- Hanja: 表正德
- RR: Pyo Jeongdeok
- MR: P'yo Chŏngdŏk

Masanori Toguchi (戸口 正徳, Toguchi Masanori), born Pyo Jeong-deok (Korean: 표정덕; Hanja: 表正德; February 7, 1948), is a retired Zainichi Korean professional wrestler best known by his ring name Kim Duk (Japanese: キム・ドク, Hepburn: Kimu Doku). He was also known by the name Tiger Chung Lee in the World Wrestling Federation.

== Early life ==
Masanori Toguchi was a basketball player and jūdōka during his high school days. After graduation, he joined the Japan Pro Wrestling Alliance dojo with the recommendation from Kintarō Ōki. Since Seiji Sakaguchi, another jūdōka, joined the JWA during the same time, it caused a conflict between the jūdō and puroresu industries. Toguchi was sent to South Korea for half a year with "special training" as an excuse until the issue died out.

== Professional wrestling career ==
=== 1968–1981 ===
Masanori Toguchi debuted for Japan Pro Wrestling Alliance on August 30, 1968, against future NJPW referee Katsuhisa Shibata. During his rookie year, he was also trained by Karl Gotch. In his days in JWA, he was Ōki's student. When JWA folded in 1972, Toguchi went to the United States, where he developed himself as a heel under his Korean real name, Kim Duk. He spent the next four years roaming around NWA territories and in the American Wrestling Association. In 1976, he returned to Japan for All Japan Pro Wrestling, while wrestling for the NWA's Mid-Atlantic territory in the States. He was managed by Boris Malenko in the Mid-Atlantic area, often teaming with another Malenko protege, The Masked Superstar. During his Mid-Atlantic run, Duk had a short-lived feud with then-reigning Mid-Atlantic Heavyweight Champion Wahoo McDaniel. In AJPW, he had a heated rivalry with Jumbo Tsuruta. In 1979, he would defect to International Wrestling Enterprise, before defecting to New Japan Pro-Wrestling in 1981.

=== World Wrestling Federation (1983-1988) ===
Duk went to the World Wrestling Federation in 1983 under the name Tiger Chung Lee. He formed a tag team with Mr. Fuji but fell out with him and turned babyface after they lost to The Wild Samoans at the Philadelphia Spectrum in 1984. Lee later dropped lower down the card and reverted to heel. He left the WWF in 1988.

=== 1982–1995 ===
In 1982, Kim Duk began wrestling for the NWA's Kansas City territory, before moving to the World Wrestling Federation in 1983 under the name Tiger Chung Lee. After leaving the WWF in 1988, he went back to the Kim Duk name and wrestled for World Wrestling Council in Puerto Rico. Upon his return to Japan in 1991, he balanced wrestling for various promotions including New Japan Pro-Wrestling between 1991 and 1992, W*ING between 1992 and 1993, and WAR in 1994. Between 1993 and 1994, he would wrestle in Mexico for Universal Wrestling Association under the name YAMATO. By 1995, he retired from wrestling.

=== 2001–2024 ===
In 2001, Kim Duk made his return to AJPW, helping out the promotion during their crisis after the Pro Wrestling Noah exodus.

Kim Duk had since remained semi-retired and works for a non-profit organization. He still wrestles on special legends matches from time to time. Since 2007, he has been running Wrestle-Aid. His last match as a full-time wrestler was on May 6, 2011, in a tag team match, teaming with Raideen against Masaru Toi and Red Tiger.

He returned to wrestling in February 2018. On June 10, 2018, at the age of 70, he won the WEW Heavyweight Championship defeating Daisaku Shimoda at a show for Pro Wrestling A-Team in Tokyo, Japan. He lost the title back to Shimoda on January 19, 2019.

In September 2019, Kim Duk pulled out of Tokyo Championship Wrestling's (TCW) tour due to chest pains, which ended up being arrhythmia. In December 2019, he flew to Cleveland, Ohio in the United States to undergo surgery at the Cleveland Clinic to put a catheter in his heart. In February 2020, TCW held a benefit show to help pay for his surgery.

On May 31, 2022, Duk would wrestle his last match on at the Jumbo Tsuruta tribute show at Korakuen Hall, officially retiring after nearly fifty four years.

He returned on August 24, 2024 at the FMW-E Terry Funk Memorial & Atsushi Onita 50th Anniversary in Kawasaki, Japan, where he teamed with Yuichi Taniguchi defeating Chikara and Masahiko Takasugi.

== Acting career ==
In 1986, while wrestling in the U.S. for the WWF, Kim Duk made his acting debut as a henchman of Charles Dance's character, Sardo Numspa, in The Golden Child, which starred Eddie Murphy. Two years later, he portrayed a Georgian mobster named Andrei 'The Mongol Hippie' in the Arnold Schwarzenegger film, Red Heat. A year later, he acted in two more films, Blind Fury starring Rutger Hauer, and Cage, starring Lou Ferrigno. In 2012, after a long hiatus from acting, Kim Duk portrayed Lee in the film, Mountain Mafia.

== Championships and accomplishments ==
- All Japan Pro Wrestling
  - NWA International Tag Team Championship (1 time) – with Kintarō Ōki
  - Champion Carnival Fighting Spirit Award (1980)
  - World's Strongest Tag Determination Fair Play Award (1977) – with Kintarō Ōki
  - World's Strongest Tag Determination Effort Award (1978) – with Kintarō Ōki
  - World's Strongest Tag Determination Team Play Award (1979) – with Kintarō Ōki
- Central States Wrestling
  - NWA Central States Tag Team Championship (1 time) – with Yasu Fuji
- NWA Tri-State
  - NWA United States Tag Team Championship (Tri-State version) (1 time) – with Stan Kowalski
- Pro Wrestling A-Team
  - WEW Heavyweight Championship (1 time)
- Tokyo Sports
  - Fighting Spirit Award (1978)
- Universal Wrestling Association
  - UWA World Heavyweight Championship (2 times)
- World Wrestling Council
  - WWC Caribbean Heavyweight Championship (2 times)

=== Lucha de Apuesta record ===
Wager	Winner	Loser	Location	Date	Notes
Mask	Dos Caras	YAMATO	Naucalpan, Mexico	August 1, 1993	Mask vs. Mask vs. Mask Triangle Match that also included El Canek
Hair	El Canek	YAMATO	Naucalpan, Mexico	August 15, 1993	Mask vs. Hair Match
