= Kazuo Okamura =

Japanese-American wrestler

Personal information
- Born: George Kazuo Okamura; October 11, 1911 Hood River, Oregon, U.S.
- Died: December 17, 1973 (aged 62) Los Angeles, California, U.S.
- Education: Oregon University

Professional wrestling career
- Ring name: The Great Togo
- Billed from: Japan
- Trained by: Tsutao Higami
- Debut: 1938
- Retired: 1968

George Kazuo Okamura (岡村 一夫, Okamura Kazuo; October 11, 1911 – December 17, 1973) was an American professional wrestler. Better known by the ring name The Great Togo, he was one of the first wrestling heels of Japanese descent in America after World War II.

== Early life and education ==
Okamura was born to Japanese parents in United States. He studied philosophy at Oregon University before starting his wrestling career.

== Professional wrestling career ==
Okamura debuted in professional wrestling in 1938. Like many other wrestlers of Japanese descent at the time, he adopted a foreign heel gimmick and an Asian-sounding ring name, in this case "The Great Togo." He hailed himself as a martial artist with karate skills, prayed in a small Buddhist altar before his matches, and was assisted by a fellow Japanese valet named Hata who burned incense. He became one of the most hated villains of the ring, as well as one of the most feared wrestlers. Despite his technical skill, his matches often ended in disqualifications in order for his opponents to save face.

During the 1950s, he started a long and heated feud with Argentine Rocca. He later introduced his kayfabe brother Tosh Togo, who became his usual tag team partner. Their team would expand with more Japanese family members, Mas Togo (Kyokushin karate founder Mas Oyama) and Ko Endo (judoka Kokichi Endo).

From the 1950s to the 1960s he played as Rikidozan's manager in the Pacific Coast area.

== Later life and death ==
After his retirement, he moved along with his wife to Los Angeles, where he died in 1973 due to a gastric carcinoma.

== Championships and accomplishments ==
- Maple Leaf Wrestling
  - NWA Canadian Open Tag Team Championship (1 time) – with Tosh Togo
- NWA Hollywood Wrestling
  - NWA International Television Tag Team Championship (1 time) – with Tosh Togo

== Filmography ==
- The Delicate Delinquent (1957) as "The Great Togo"
