= Yoshihiro Momota =

Japanese professional wrestler

Personal information
- Born: March 15, 1946 Kyoto, Japan
- Died: November 22, 2000 (aged 54)

Professional wrestling career
- Billed height: 1.78 m (5 ft 10 in)
- Billed weight: 105.0 kg (231.5 lb)
- Trained by: Dory Funk Jr. Pat O'Connor; Sonny Myers; Terry Funk
- Debut: 1975
- Retired: 1987

Yoshihiro Momota (百田 義浩, Momota Yoshihiro) (March 15, 1946 – November 22, 2000) was a professional wrestler and a former ring announcer, known for his tenure in All Japan Pro Wrestling. He was the son of wrestler Rikidozan and the older brother of Mitsuo Momota.

== Career ==
On October 21, 1972, Momota, along with Shohei "Giant" Baba and younger brother Mitsuo Momota, founded All Japan Pro Wrestling where he started out as a ring announcer for the promotion. Around the mid-1970s, Momota decided to become a wrestler just like his father and his brother. He started training with Terry Funk and Dory Funk Jr. and began wrestling in Texas before wrestling full-time for All Japan. His wrestling career didn't take off as well as planned although he did find a little success. In 1987 he retired from in-ring competition and decided to become a backstage helper and a member of the All Japan board of directors until he resigned from his position after Mitsuharu Misawa had disagreements with widow Motoko Baba. He joined Pro Wrestling Noah as a backstage helper and a member of the board of directors, but in September 2000, his health was beginning to deteriorate due to liver failure.

== Family ==
Momota was the son of Rikidozan, a wrestling legend who is known as the "Father of Puroresu". He also had a younger brother Mitsuo Momota. His nephew is named Chikara and made his professional wrestling debut in 2013.

== Death ==
On November 22, 2000, Momota died of liver failure. He was 54 years old.

== Championships and accomplishments ==
- All Japan Pro Wrestling

- 11-Man Battle Royal winner (1979)

- Tokyo Sports
  - Service Award (2001)
