= NWA International Heavyweight Championship =

Former wrestling title

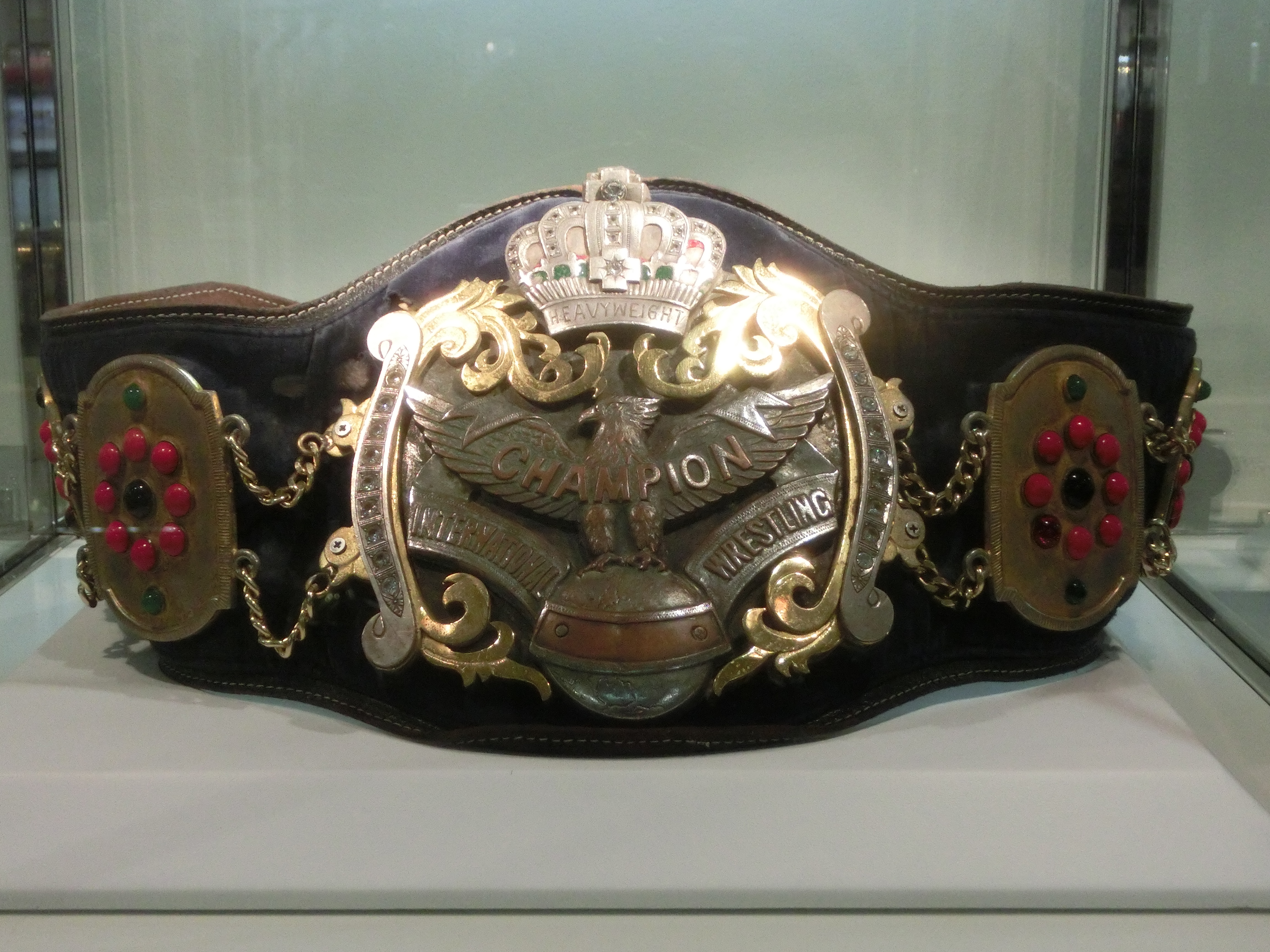
- The NWA International Heavyweight Championship belt

Details
- Promotion: Japan Wrestling Association (1958-1973); South Korea (1973-1981); International Wrestling Enterprise (1981); All Japan Pro Wrestling (1981-1989)
- Date established: November, 1957
- Date retired: April 18, 1989
Statistics
- First champion: Lou Thesz
- Most reigns: Giant Baba, Dory Funk, Jr., Bruiser Brody & Jumbo Tsuruta (3 reigns)
- Longest reign: Kintarō Ōki (3,052 days)
- Shortest reign: Jumbo Tsuruta (Less than 1 day)
- Oldest champion: Bobo Brazil (48 years, 144 days)
- Youngest champion: Giant Baba (27 years, 305 days)
- Heaviest champion: Giant Baba (330 lb (150 kg; 24 st))
- Lightest champion: Lou Thesz (225 lb (102 kg; 16.1 st))

The NWA International Heavyweight Championship was a singles title recognized by the National Wrestling Alliance through its partnership with the Japan Pro Wrestling Alliance, and later by All Japan Pro Wrestling. It is one of the three titles unified into the Triple Crown Heavyweight Championship in 1989. In 1983, Giant Baba would elevate the title further in the eyes of many when he, as the reigning PWF Heavyweight Champion, declared Jumbo Tsuruta to be the new "Ace" of All Japan after Jumbo won the NWA International Heavyweight Championship from Bruiser Brody. Following the withdrawal of All Japan from the NWA, the International title was briefly sanctioned by the Pacific Wrestling Federation until the unification of the Triple Crown could be completed.

Under Rikidōzan the belt had a design similar to Lou Thesz's original NWA World Heavyweight Championship belt during the 1950s, but after Rikidōzan's death, the belt given to Giant Baba had the design seen on the belt part of the Triple Crown until 2013. The original design was later used on the PWF Heavyweight Championship, the UWFI belt (which was the original Lou Thesz belt), and a belt later given to Kazushi Sakuraba for show.

== Title history ==
Symbol	Meaning
No.	The overall championship reign
Reign	The reign number for the specific wrestler listed.
Event	The event in which the championship changed hands
N/A	The specific information is not known
—	Used for vacated reigns in order to not count it as an official reign
[Note #]	Indicates that the exact length of the title reign is unknown, with a note providing more details.

#	Wrestler	Reign	Date	Days held	Location	Event	Notes	Ref.
Japan Pro Wrestling Alliance (JPWA)
1	Lou Thesz	1	November 1, 1957	299	N/A	N/A	Thesz was awarded the championship by the NWA after losing the World Heavyweight Championship to Dick Hutton. Houston NWA promoter Morris Sigel claimed that Thesz had won the title by defeating Antonino Rocca in 1949.	
2	Rikidōzan	1	August 27, 1958	1,936	Los Angeles, California, United States	House show	Thesz claims the match was not for the title and continues defending the title in the U.S. and Europe until regaining the NWA World Heavyweight Championship in January 1963.	
-	Vacated	-	December 15, 1963	-	N/A	N/A	Vacated following Rikidōzan's death from stab wounds suffered one week earlier in Tokyo, Japan.	
3	Giant Baba	1	November 24, 1965	944	Osaka, Japan	House show	Defeated Dick the Bruiser for the vacant title.	
4	Bobo Brazil	1	June 25, 1968	2	Nagoya, Japan	House show		
5	Giant Baba	2	June 27, 1968	889	Tokyo, Japan	House show		
6	Gene Kiniski	1	December 3, 1970	16	Osaka, Japan	House show		
7	Giant Baba	3	December 19, 1970	623	Los Angeles, California, United States	House show		
-	Vacated	-	September 2, 1972	-	N/A	N/A	Vacated when Baba left the Japan Wrestling Association to start All Japan Pro Wrestling.	
8	Bobo Brazil	2	December 1, 1972	3	Yokohama, Japan	House show	Defeated Kintarō Ōki for the vacant title.	
9	Kintarō Ōki	1	December 4, 1972	3,052	Hiroshima, Japan	House show		
International Wrestling Enterprise (IWE)
-	Vacated	-	April 13, 1981	-	N/A	N/A	After the JWA closed in 1973, Ohki took the belt to South Korea from where he defended it. After briefly returning to Japan and making some defenses in IWE, Ohki vacated the title on April 13, 1981 under orders from the NWA.	
All Japan Pro Wrestling (AJPW)
10	Dory Funk, Jr.	1	April 30, 1981	527	Matsudo, Japan	International Champions Series day 7	Won tournament for the vacant title when Bruiser Brody was injured and unable to wrestle in the finals. Defeated Terry Funk for his first title defense instead.	
12	Bruiser Brody	1	October 9, 1981	23	Tokyo, Japan	Giant Series day 7		
13	Dory Funk, Jr.	2	November 1, 1981	171	Tokyo, Japan	Giant Series day 26		
14	Bruiser Brody	2	April 21, 1982	12	Osaka, Japan	Grand Champion Series day 6		
15	Bruce Reed	1	May 3, 1982	29	West Palm Beach, Florida, United States		Title reign not recognized in Japan.	
16	Dory Funk, Jr.	3	June 1, 1982	333	West Palm Beach, Florida, United States	House show		
17	Jumbo Tsuruta	1	April 30, 1983	1,188	Tokyo, Japan	Super Power Series day 11		
18	Stan Hansen	1	July 31, 1986	82	Tokyo, Japan	Summer Action Series day 25	Hansen's AWA World Heavyweight Championship was also on line.	
19	Jumbo Tsuruta	2	October 21, 1986	523	Tokyo, Japan	Giant Series day 17		
20	Bruiser Brody	3	March 27, 1988	22	Tokyo, Japan	Champion Carnival day 2		
21	Jumbo Tsuruta	3	April 19, 1988	364	Sendai, Japan	Champion Carnival day 20		
-	Unified	-	April 18, 1989	-	Tokyo, Japan	Champion Carnival day 21	Tsuruta Unified the title with PWF Heavyweight Championship and NWA United National Championship to create the Triple Crown Heavyweight Championship after defeating Stan Hansen	

== Combined reigns ==
Rank	Wrestler	No. of reigns	Combined days
1	Kintarō Ōki	1	3,052
2	Giant Baba	3	2,456
3	Jumbo Tsuruta	3	2,076
4	Rikidōzan	1	1,936
5	Dory Funk, Jr.	3	1,032
6	Lou Thesz	1	299
7	Stan Hansen	1	82
8	Bruiser Brody	3	74
9	Bruce Reed	1	29
10	Gene Kiniski	1	16
11	Bobo Brazil	2	5

== See also ==
- List of National Wrestling Alliance championships
