= Rikidōzan =

Korean-Japanese professional wrestler and sumo wrestler (1924–1963)

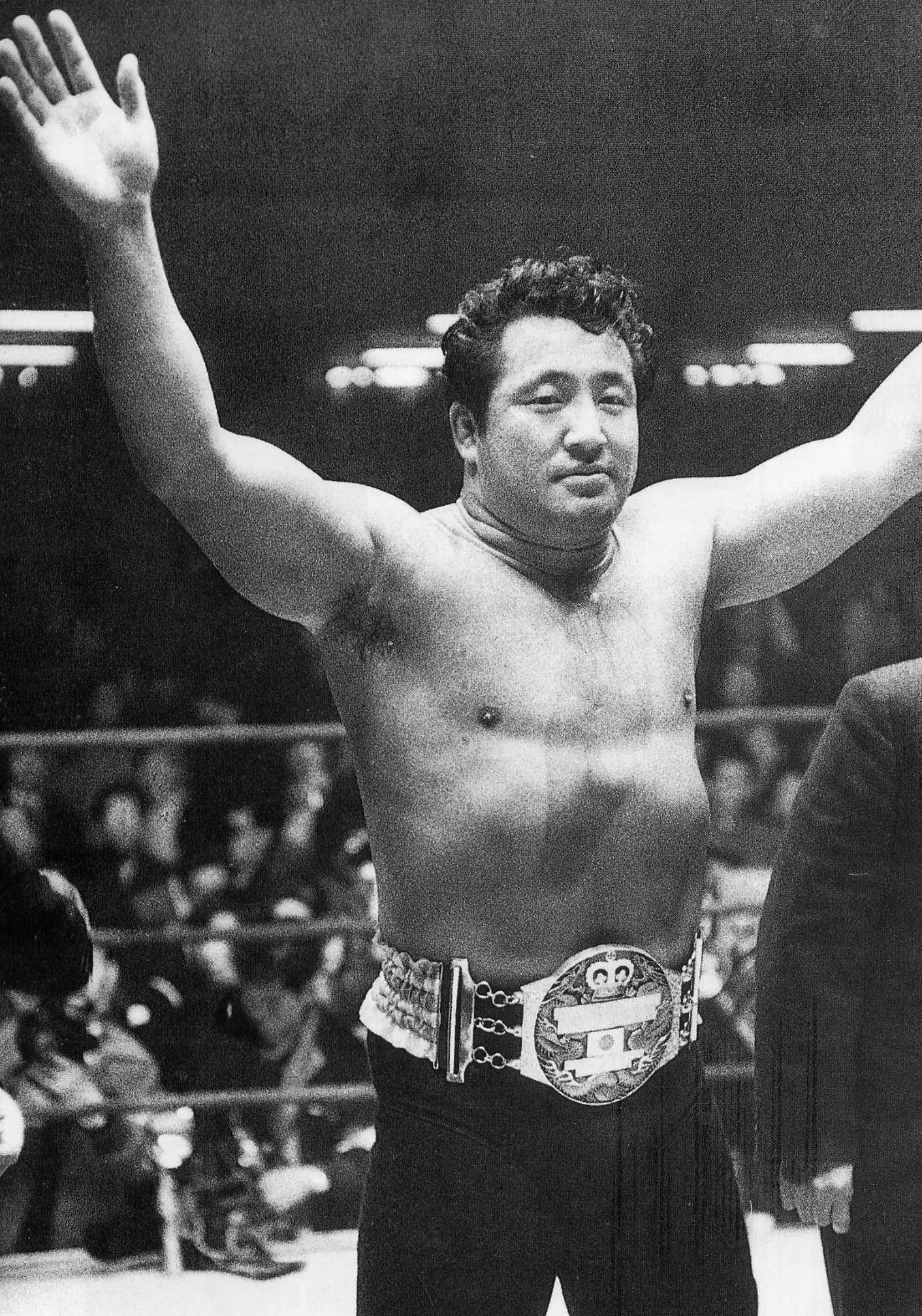
- Rikidōzan as the Japanese Heavyweight Champion in 1954

Personal information
- Born: Kim Sin-rak (김신락); November 14, 1924 Hongwon County, Kankyōnan-dō, Chōsen
- Died: December 15, 1963 (aged 39) Tokyo, Japan
- Children: 3, including Mitsuo and Yoshihiro
- Family: Pak Myong-chol (son-in-law)

Professional wrestling career
- Ring name(s): Mitsuhiro Momota; Rikidōzan
- Billed height: 1.75 m (5 ft 9 in)
- Billed weight: 110 kg (243 lb)
- Billed from: Nagasaki
- Trained by: Bobby Bruns; Harold Sakata
- Debut: October 28, 1951
- Retired: December 7, 1963 (last match)

Rikidōzan Mitsuhiro
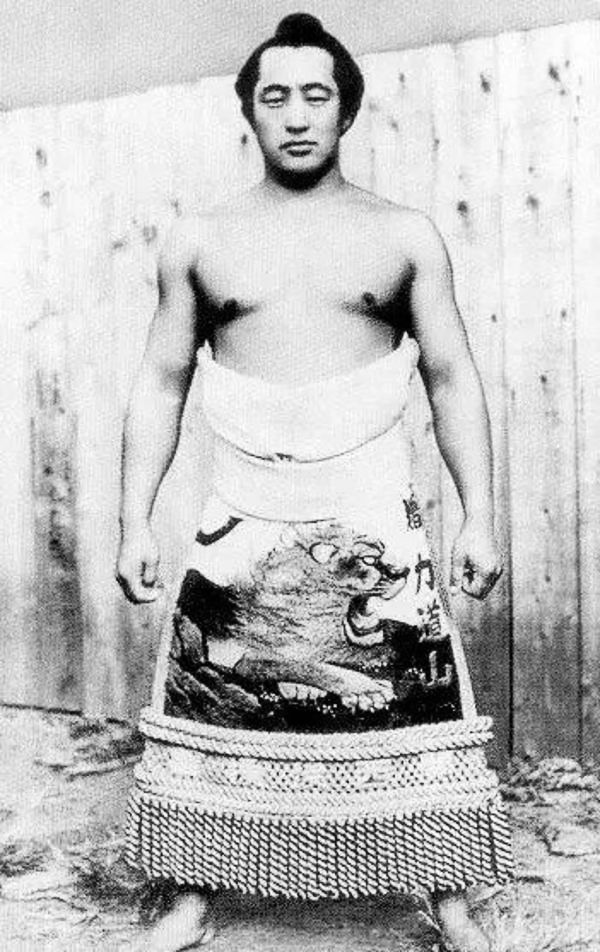
- Rikidōzan in 1949, in traditional sumo keshō-mawashi

Personal information
- Native name: 力道山 光浩
- Height: 1.75 m (5 ft 9 in)
- Weight: 116 kg (256 lb; 18 st 4 lb)

Sport
- Sport: Sumo
- Retired: September 1950
- Heya: Nishonoseki
- Record: 135–82–15
- Debut: May 1940
- Highest rank: Sekiwake (May 1949)
- Championships: 1 (Makushita); 1 (Sandanme)
- Special Prizes: Outstanding Performance (1)
- Gold Stars: 2 (Azumafuji)
- Updated on May 2013

Mitsuhiro Momota (Note: Kanji: 百田 光浩; Hepburn: Momota Mitsuhiro; Hiragana: ももた みつひろ; Katakana: モモタ ミツヒロ) (born Kim Sin-rak; (Note: Hangul: 김신락; Hanja: 金信洛; Katakana: キム シンラク) November 14, 1924 (Note: North Korean claim) – December 15, 1963), better known by the ring name Rikidōzan (力道山), was a Korean-Japanese professional wrestler and sumo wrestler. He was known as the father of professional wrestling in Japan, nicknamed "The Father of Puroresu" (日本プロレス界の父), and is considered one of the most influential people in professional wrestling history.

Born in Korea under Japanese rule, in an area that is now part of North Korea, Momota initially practiced ssireum before moving to Nagasaki to become a sumo wrestler. As a member of the Nishonoseki stable, he was given the shikona Rikidōzan Mitsuhiro (力道山 光浩). He competed in sumo until 1951, retiring as a sekiwake, and was introduced to professional wrestling by members of the American National Wrestling Alliance. Credited with popularizing professional wrestling in Japan at a time when its people needed a hero to emulate, he was lauded as a national icon.

At the age of 39, Momota died from peritonitis, which had been caused by stab wounds he had suffered a week prior in an altercation with a yakuza member at a Tokyo nightclub. He was posthumously inducted into the WWE Hall of Fame in 2017, becoming the first ethnic Korean inductee and the third puroresu inductee (after Antonio Inoki and Tatsumi Fujinami).

== Early life ==
Kim Sin-rak was born on November 14, 1924, in Hongwon County, Kankyōnan-dō, which was then part of Korea under Japanese rule and is now part of North Korea. He was the youngest son of Chon Gi and Kim Sok-tee, the owner of a farm with a Confucian tradition. He looked after his father during a period of ill health, whilst his mother and older brothers tended to the family farm. Kim participated in ssireum in his youth and, after placing third in a local competition, spoke to Minosuke Momota, the father-in-law of a Japanese man from Omura who had moved to the area to become a police officer. Momota was interested in sumo and supported the Nishonoseki stable. He had recruited several Korean boys for the stable, and persuaded Kim to join as well. However, Kim's family refused due to his responsibility to care for his father. After his father's death in 1939, he left for Japan despite his mother's objections.

== Sumo career ==
Joining the Nishonoseki stable, Kim debuted in June 1940. At first, his Korean origins were indicated on sumo ranking sheets, and he received harassment and racial discrimination for this. However, he was adopted by Momota and took the name Mitsuhiro Momota, and a story was fabricated that he had been born in Omura, Nagasaki. Despite this, he did not attain Japanese citizenship until 1951. He was given the shikona of Rikidōzan Mitsuhiro (Japanese: 力道山 光浩, Hepburn: Rikidouzan Mitsuhiro). He reached the top makuuchi division in 1946 and was runner-up to yokozuna Haguroyama in the tournament of June 1947, losing a playoff for the championship. He fought in 23 tournaments in total, with a win–loss record of 135–82. His highest rank was sekiwake, though he was reportedly close to a promotion to ōzeki before his retirement.

Several reasons have been given for his retirement. The amount of success he had earned despite his humble beginnings was a source of envy amongst his seniors in Nishonoseki. Racial discrimination may have also been a factor, but the impetus for his retirement came due to a financial dispute with stable-master Tamanoumi Daitarō. Rikidozan felt that his substantial contributions to the stable made him worthy of major financial support, but Tamanoumi considered him selfish, and he was refused after a heated argument. While the public explanation for his retirement claimed that he suffered from paragonimiasis, the truth was that on September 10, 1950, soon after the argument with Tamanoumi, Momota "impulsively" cut his own chonmage top knot.

After his retirement, Momota initially worked alongside Americans as a black marketeer. His business came through purchasing the belongings of US soldiers departing for service in Korea, and selling these goods to the Japanese. He eventually left this job, and after a petition to return to sumo was rejected, he was given work as a construction supervisor by his former patron Shinsaku Nitta. Nitta had worked in a Tokyo prisoner-of-war camp during World War II, and had secretly provided American prisoners with food and cigarettes; to repay him for his kindness, former prisoners who went on to work at the GHQ gave his construction company preferential treatment when contracting reconstruction work. Nitta also had ties to the criminal underworld, and had been deeply involved with sumo in this manner. (Note: Organizers of sumo events had to give notice to and ask permission of dominant figures, often criminals, before running provincial tours, or they risked their events being obstructed. These figures, of which Nitta was one, also took substantial cuts of the box office for these events. This tradition would carry over into the early professional wrestling business in Japan.)

== Professional wrestling career ==
=== Debut, American excursion, and megastardom (1951–1958) ===
In July 1951, the Tokyo-based Torii Oasis Shriners Club announced their intent to sponsor a charity drive for disabled children, for which they would arrange a professional wrestling tour. These events would be promoted by Honolulu businessman Moe Lipton. Around this time, Rikidōzan reportedly expressed interest in becoming a professional wrestler. In September, wrestling promoter Al Karasick of Honolulu-based Mid-Pacific Promotions announced that he, alongside Joe Malcewicz of NWA San Francisco, had secured a deal with Lipton. Karasick and Malcewisz would send six wrestlers for a twelve-date tour, held from September 30 to December 11. (Note: Later events on this tour would also feature some of Joe Louis' final exhibition fights.) These wrestlers included Harold Sakata and Mid-Pacific booker Bobby Bruns. While Bruns was in Japan before the tour began, he invited Rikidozan, as well as judoka Kokichi Endo and Yasuyuki Sakabe, to participate in these events. After one month of training, Rikidozan made his professional wrestling debut at Ryogoku Memorial Hall on October 28, 1951, wrestling Bruns to a ten-minute time-limit draw. He would continue to work on the rest of the tour, although he would later comment that he had done so with great difficulty, as he lacked the stamina required of wrestlers.

Rikidōzan left Japan in February 1952 to work in America for further training and experience. This began with a five-month stint for Mid-Pacific Promotions, where he was trained by Oki Shikina.

Rikidōzan's breakout performances were with partner and famous judoka Masahiko Kimura in matches against the Canadian Sharpe Brothers in 1954, coinciding with increased television viewership in Japan. His partnership with Kimura culminated in a match between the two in December of that year, during which Rikidōzan legitimately assaulted and knocked Kimura unconscious in order to win, leading to death threats at the time from the Yakuza. He continued to establish himself as Japan's biggest wrestling star by defeating foreign wrestlers, becoming a major television star in the process. This was shortly after World War II, and the Japanese needed someone who could stand up to the Americans. Rikidōzan thus became immensely popular in Japan. His American opponents assisted him by portraying themselves as villains who cheated in their matches. Rikidōzan himself was booked as a villain when he wrestled in America early on but went on to become one of the first Japanese wrestlers to be cheered as a babyface in post World War II America.

=== NWA International Heavyweight Champion (1958–1963) ===
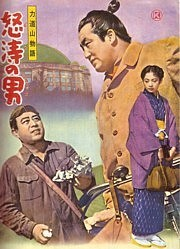
Rikidōzan on a poster for the 1955 film Rikidōzan monogatari dotō no otoko.

Rikidōzan gained worldwide renown when he defeated Lou Thesz for the NWA International Heavyweight Championship on August 27, 1958, in Japan. In another match, Thesz willingly agreed to put over Rikidōzan at the expense of his own reputation. This built up mutual respect between the two wrestlers, and Rikidōzan never forgot what Thesz did. He would go on to capture several NWA titles in matches both in Japan and overseas. Rikidōzan also trained professional wrestling students, notably including Kanji "Antonio" Inoki, Kintarō Ōki, and Shohei "Giant" Baba.

His signature move was the karate chop, which was actually based on sumo's harite, rather than actual karate. Rikidozan had likely conceived the move while being with a Korean-born karateka, Hideo Nakamura, who was one of Rikidozan's dearest friends. It was rumored that he had been coached by fellow Korean Masutatsu Oyama.

He established the Japan Pro Wrestling Alliance (JWA), Japan's first professional wrestling promotion, in 1953. His first major feud was against Masahiko Kimura, the famous judoka who had been invited by Momota to compete as a professional wrestler (leading to the aforementioned shoot incident). Other famous feuds included those against Thesz in 1957–58, against "Classy" Freddie Blassie in 1962, and against Dick "The Destroyer" Beyer in 1963. In wrestling journalist John M. Molinaro's 2002 book Top 100 Pro Wrestlers of All Time, it is noted that two of his matches are rated in the top ten television programs of all time in Japan. His October 6, 1957 hour-long draw with Lou Thesz for the NWA World Heavyweight Championship drew an 87.0 rating, and his May 24, 1963 hour-long two out of three falls draw with The Destroyer drew a 67.0 rating, but a larger viewing audience (the largest in Japanese history) than the previous match, since more people had television sets by 1963.

== Acting ==
Rikidōzan appeared in 29 films, including お月様には悪いけど Otsukisama ni wa warui kedo (1954, as himself), やがて青空 Yagate aozora (1955, as himself), and 力道山物語 怒濤の男 Rikidōzan monogatari dotō no otoko (1955 as himself).

== Personal life ==
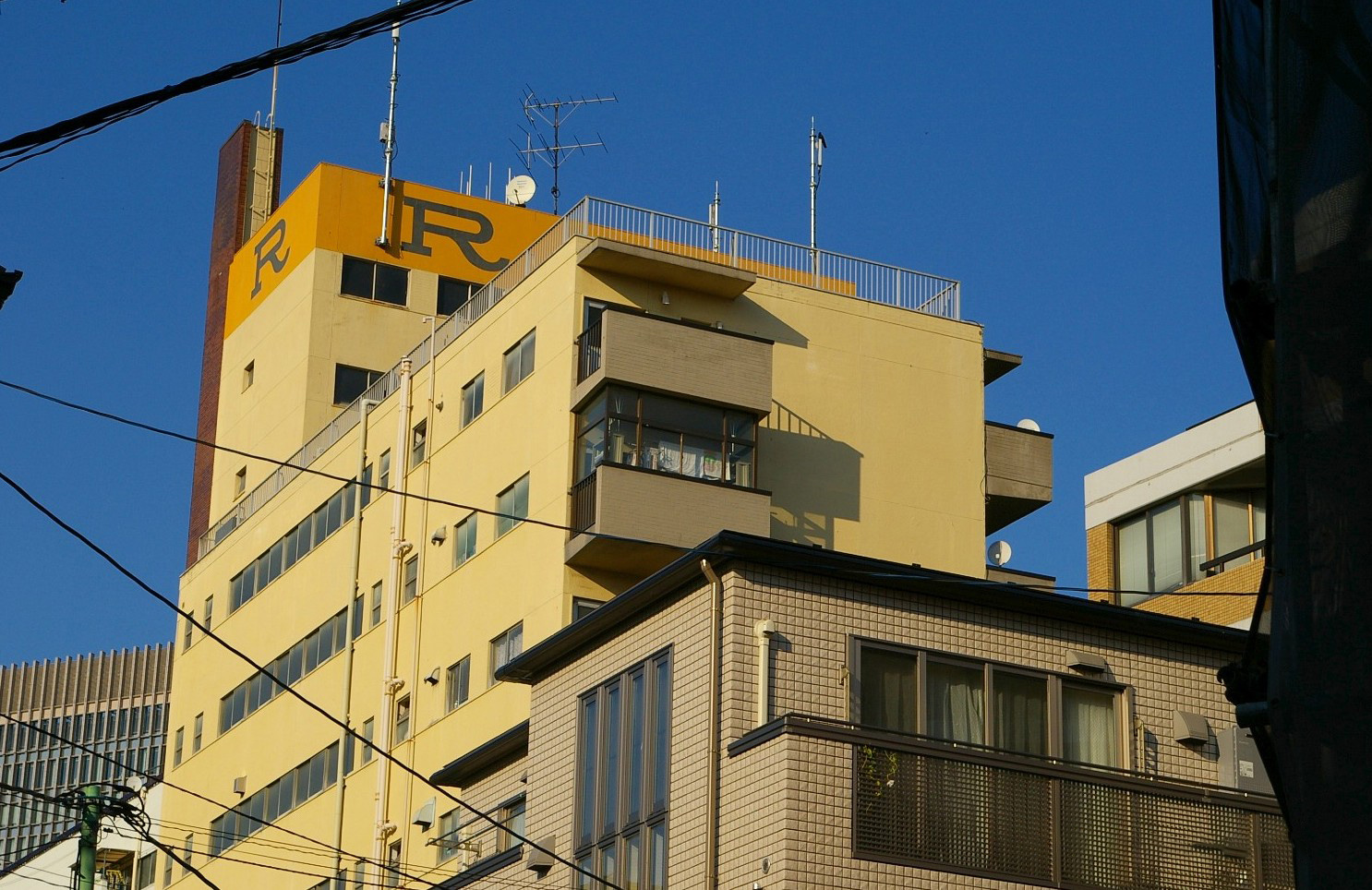
Momota's apartment, nicknamed the Riki Mansion, in 2007

Momota acquired nightclubs, hotels, condominiums, and boxing promotions with the wealth he had accrued from wrestling. His luxurious apartment, known as the Riki Mansion, is located in the Akasaka district of Tokyo and is recognizable for the large "R" (for "Rikidōzan") printed on the side of the building. Momota also owned the nine-storey Riki Sports Palace in Shibuya, which included a bowling alley, a pool room, a bar known as Club Riki, and a restaurant known as Riki Restaurant. Shortly before his death, he had purchased land in Lake Sagami and had begun work on a large scale golf course to be known as Lakeside Country Club, set to feature facilities such as a shooting range, indoor skate rink, hotel, and more along the shore of the lake. However, it remained incomplete due to his death, eventually being sold and becoming the hotel Sagami Lake Resort.

Momota had many girlfriends throughout his life, often multiple at the same time. He married his wife, Keiko Tanaka, shortly before his death. A 1984 article in weekly Playboy drew much attention after it revealed that he was actually Korean and had been married with children before he met Tanaka, considered a taboo in Japan. His son Mitsuo wrestled from 1970 to 2021, and his other son Yoshihiro wrestled from 1975 to 1987. He also has a daughter named Kim Yong-suk, who was born from one of his early marriages before he left for Japan; she is married to politician Pak Myong-chol (박명철). Mitsuo's own son, Chikara, made his in-ring debut on December 16, 2013, the day after the 50th anniversary of his grandfather's death.

Momota spent his spare time hunting and was said to own several hunting guns at the time of his death. His autobiography also claimed that he made his wife carry a handgun wherever she went. He would also play shogi with professional player Kusama Matsuji. He was a friend of martial artist Hideo Nakamura, a fellow Japanese athlete of Korean origin. It is said that he adored Nakamura and called him "Hyung Nim (형님)", a Korean term essentially translating to "my older brother".

Inejirō Asanuma (right) pays tribute to Rikidōzan at the opening of the Pro Wrestling Center Dojo, 2 October 1959

He was also friends with Japan Socialist Party leader Inejirō Asanuma. Asanuma, a longtime sumo enthusiast who had served as vice-captain of the Waseda University sumo club and later joined the Japan Sumo Association's Operations Deliberation Committee in 1957, developed a close personal relationship with Momota through their shared interest in combat sports. Asanuma attended events connected to Japanese professional wrestling, including paying tribute to Momota at the opening of the Pro-Wrestling Center Dojo in 1959. Upon learning of Asanuma's assassination in October 1960, Momota was reportedly left speechless.

After Momota's death, actor Ikuro Otsuji also lived in the Riki Mansion. Momota's son Mitsuo said that while his father owned a lot of property and real estate, he also had a lot of debt, and the inheritance tax on his estate was upwards of ¥20 million (equivalent to ¥96.9 million or $665,000 in 2023) due to Momota owing millions in unpaid taxes.

== Public image ==
After his wrestling matches, Momota would often immediately go to Riki Sports Palace and start drinking without cleaning his wounds. He was known to joke with the bar staff that "work was awful today" while covered in blood or sporting a large scar on his face. Due to the notoriety he gained from his wrestling career, he was a huge celebrity in Japan and was frequently discussed in tabloids and magazines.

Despite Momota's public reputation as a national hero, he was also known for being a troublemaker, especially in the later years of his career. Due to his deteriorating physical health, he began to abuse painkillers in the early 1960s and would take stimulants before and after his matches. He would leave bar staff a tip of as much as ¥10,000 when he was in a good mood, but bar fights and violence were an almost daily event when he was in a bad mood. In one incident, Momota was drinking at a bar when Cuban baseball player Roberto Barbon started heckling him and calling professional wrestling fake; Momota became hostile, threatening violence and demanding an apology, which Barbon immediately gave. His reputation as a heavy drinker also caused suspicion surrounding the legitimacy of professional wrestling at a time when the industry's inner workings were far less well known, as he could often be seen drinking and socializing with his opponents just hours after fighting them.

== Death ==
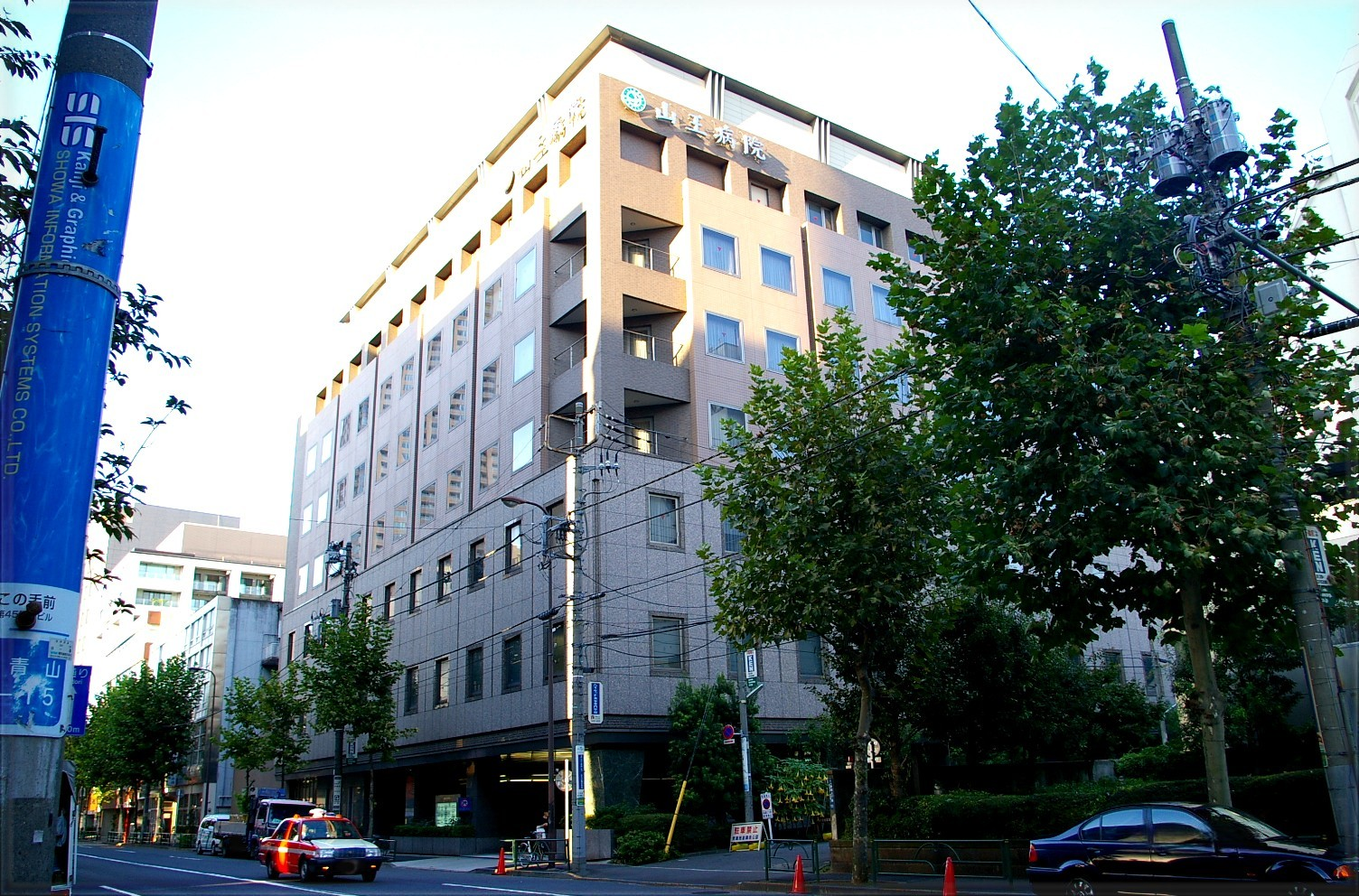
Momota entered Sannoh Hospital after being stabbed

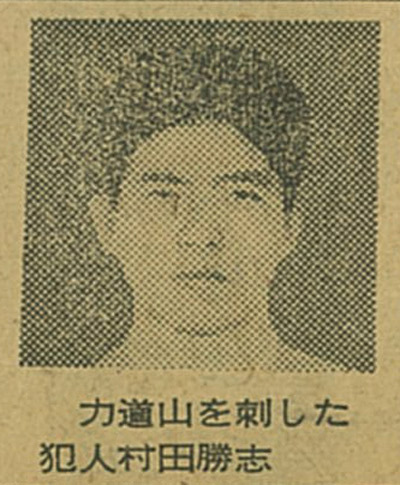
Newspaper photo of Katsushi Murata that appeared after he stabbed Momota

On December 8, 1963, Momota was stabbed by Katsushi Murata, a member of the Sumiyoshi-ikka yakuza branch, after an altercation in a Tokyo nightclub. Momota alleged that Murata stepped on his shoe and demanded an apology. Murata refused and the two began to argue, which eventually led to Momota punching Murata in the face and knocking him against a wall. Momota then mounted Murata and continued to punch him on the ground until Murata stabbed Momota once in the abdomen. Both immediately fled the scene and Momota was taken to Sannoh Hospital, where a doctor decreed the wound to be non-serious but advised Momota to have surgery.

The surgery was successful and Momota returned home, but went against doctor's orders and began eating and drinking later that day, sending his assistant to the store for sushi and sake. These actions (particularly his drinking) worsened his condition and required a second surgery one week later, but he had already developed peritonitis by this time. Momota died in the Minato district of Tokyo at approximately 9:50 p.m. on December 15, 1963, one month after his 39th birthday.

Momota's funeral was held at Ikegami Honmonji Temple in the Ōta area of Tokyo on December 20, 1963. Among those in attendance were his students, Antonio Inoki, Giant Baba, and Kintarō Ōki, as well as various other opponents from throughout his career.

Murata was found guilty of manslaughter in October 1964, and served eight years in prison before being released in 1972. Every year on December 15 since his release, he visited Momota's grave and called Momota's sons to apologize for his actions. He later became a high-ranking member of the yakuza, and died of natural causes at the age of 74 on April 9, 2013.

== Championships and accomplishments ==
- Japan Wrestling Association

- All Asia Heavyweight Championship (1 time)
- All Asia Tag Team Championship (4 times) – with Toyonobori
- JWA All Japan Tag Team Championship (1 time) – with Toyonobori
- NWA International Heavyweight Championship (1 time)
- Japanese Heavyweight Championship (1 time)
- World Big League (5 times)

- International Professional Wrestling Hall of Fame
  - Class of 2021
- Maple Leaf Pro Wrestling

- PWA Champion's Grail (1 time) – with Toyonobori (1962, revived 2024)

- Mid-Pacific Promotions

- NWA Hawaii Tag Team Championship (3 times) – with Bobby Bruns (1), Azumafuji (1) and Koukichi Endoh (1)

- National Wrestling Alliance

- NWA Hall of Fame (Class of 2011)

- NWA San Francisco

- NWA Pacific Coast Tag Team Championship (San Francisco version) (1 time) – with Dennis Clary
- NWA World Tag Team Championship (San Francisco version) (1 time) – with Koukichi Endoh

- North American Wrestling Alliance / Worldwide Wrestling Associates / NWA Hollywood Wrestling

- WWA World Heavyweight Championship (1 time)

- Professional Wrestling Hall of Fame
  - Class of 2006
- Wrestling Observer Newsletter

- Wrestling Observer Newsletter Hall of Fame (Class of 1996)

- WWE
  - WWE Hall of Fame (Class of 2017)

== Sumo top division record ==
- Only two tournaments were held through most of the 1940s and only one was held in 1946.

Rikidōzan Mitsuhiro
| - | Spring Haru basho, Tokyo | Summer Natsu basho, Tokyo | Autumn Aki basho, Tokyo |
|---|---|---|---|
| 1946 | Not held | Not held | West Maegashira #17; 9–4 |
| 1947 | Not held | East Maegashira #8; 9–1–P | East Maegashira #3; 6–5 |
| 1948 | Not held | East Maegashira #2; 8–3; O★ | East Komusubi; 6–5 |
| 1949 | West Komusubi; 8–5 | West Sekiwake; 3–12 | West Maegashira #2; 8–7 ★ |
| 1950 | West Komusubi; 10–5 | West Sekiwake; 8–7 | West Sekiwake; Retired; 0–0 |
Record given as wins–losses–absences Top division champion Top division runner-up Retired Non-participation Jūryō Lower divisions Sanshō key: F=Fighting spirit; O=Outstanding performance; T=Technique Also shown: ★=Kinboshi; P=Playoff(s); Divisions: Makuuchi — Jūryō — Makushita — Sandanme — Jonidan — Jonokuchi Makuuchi ranks: Yokozuna — Ōzeki — Sekiwake — Komusubi — Maegashira

== Legacy ==
Rikidōzan posthumously became one of the first members of the Wrestling Observer Newsletter Hall of Fame in 1996 and he was posthumously inducted into the Professional Wrestling Hall of Fame and Museum in 2006, as well as the "Legacy Wing" of the WWE Hall of Fame for the 2017 class. In 2024, Maple Leaf Pro Wrestling established the PWA Champions Grail, a championship merging the lineage of Rikidozan and Toyonobori's 1962 Toyonaka trophy with the Wrestling Retribution Project trophy won by Kenny Omega in Hollywood in 2011. In 2002, Rikidōzan was named the 3rd greatest pro wrestler of all time behind Ric Flair and rival Lou Thesz in the magazine article 100 Wrestlers of All Time by John Molinaro, edited by Dave Meltzer and Jeff Marek.

The 2004 South Korean-Japanese biographical film, Rikidōzan, was directed by Song Hae-sung and features actor Sul Kyung-gu in the title role.

In a 2022 interview with Tamashii Nation, Bin Furuya, suit actor for Ultraman in the original TV series, stated that Ultraman's famous Spacium Beam pose was inspired by Rikidozan's karate chops, as Furuya had grown up watching and idolizing Rikidozan.

== See also ==
- Glossary of sumo terms
- List of past sumo wrestlers
- List of premature professional wrestling deaths
- List of sekiwake

== Bibliography ==
- Igarashi, Yoshikuni (2000). Bodies of Memory: Narratives of War in Postwar Japanese Culture, 1945-1970. Princeton University Press. ISBN 0691049122.
- Yamaguchi, Haruo; Miyamoto, Koji; Teal, Scott (2019). The Great Pro Wrestling Venues, Volume 4: Japan: The Rikidozan Years (Kindle ed.). Crowbar Press. ISBN 978-1-940391-26-7.
