= Sumiyoshi-ikka =

Yakuza group in Japan

The Sumiyoshi-ikka (住吉一家 "Sumiyoshi Family") is an affiliate of the Sumiyoshi-kai yakuza syndicate, based in Tokyo, Japan. It was founded by a local Bakuto in the early Meiji era.
