= Giant Baba =

Japanese professional wrestler (1938–1999)

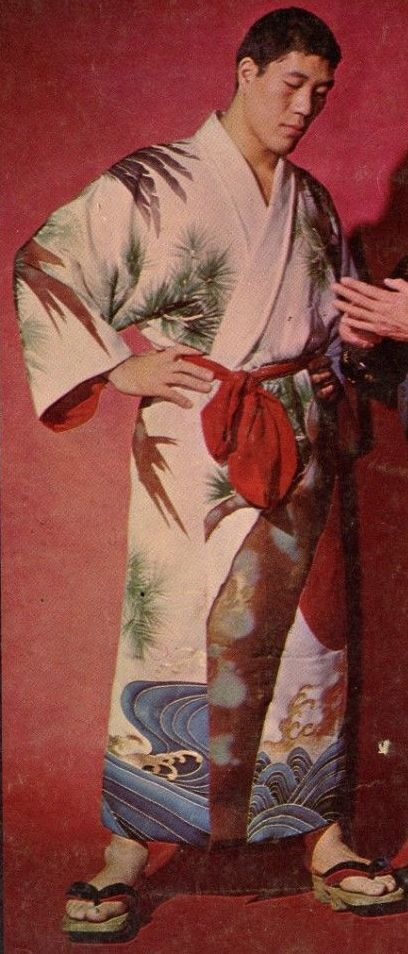
- Baba in 1964

Personal information
- Born: Shohei Baba (馬場 正平, Baba Shōhei); January 23, 1938 Sanjo, Niigata Prefecture, Japan
- Died: January 31, 1999 (aged 61) Shinjuku, Tokyo, Japan
- Cause of death: Colon cancer
- Spouse: Motoko Kawai (m. 1971)

Professional wrestling career
- Ring name(s): Baba the Giant; Giant Baba; Shohei Baba; Shohei Big Baba
- Billed height: 6 ft 10 in (208 cm)
- Billed weight: 310 lb (141 kg)
- Trained by: Fred Atkins; Kazuo Okamura; Rikidōzan
- Debut: September 30, 1960

Shohei Baba (馬場 正平, Baba Shōhei; January 23, 1938 – January 31, 1999), best known by his ring name Giant Baba (ジャイアント馬場, Jaianto Baba), was a Japanese professional wrestler, promoter, and professional baseball player. He is best known as a co-founder of All Japan Pro Wrestling (AJPW), a promotion he founded in 1972 along with Mitsuo Momota and Yoshihiro Momota, the sons of his mentor Rikidōzan. For the first 10 years of its existence, Baba was the top star of All Japan, while also serving as the booker, promoter, head trainer and president of the promotion from its inception in 1972 till his death in 1999. Baba was also responsible for recruiting much of the talent for All Japan, and was the public face of the promotion for much of his lifetime.

Considered one of the most beloved Japanese wrestlers ever, Baba was a national hero with a level of popularity in Japan comparable to that of Hulk Hogan in the United States. The 2006 Top 100 Historical Persons in Japan survey ranked Baba the 93rd greatest person in the history of Japan, as voted for by the general public. Among his many accomplishments, Baba was a record seven-time winner of the Champion Carnival, a four-time PWF World Heavyweight Champion, three time NWA International Heavyweight Champion and a three-time NWA World Heavyweight Champion.

== Early life ==
Shohei Baba was born on January 23, 1938, in Sanjo, Niigata Prefecture, the last son of Kazuo and Mitsu Baba. For most of his early childhood, Baba was one of the smallest children in his class, however, around the fifth grade, he began to grow at a rapid rate, and by the time he was in the ninth grade he was already 175 cm tall. It soon became apparent he was suffering from gigantism. Nevertheless, Baba excelled at baseball, becoming the top player at his local club. After graduating from elementary school, Baba enrolled in the department of mechanical engineering at Sanjo Business High School. Baba was forced to give up baseball when he joined high school as he was continuing to grow at an incredible rate (190 cm at the age of 16) and no cleats could be sourced in his size. He soon joined the art club instead, but this didn't last long as the school ordered custom cleats and Baba was invited to join the baseball team. Baba continued to impress, recording 18 strikeouts during a practice game, which led to tabloids reporting on "Sanjo High School's giant pitcher" and Baba garnering the attention of Nippon Professional Baseball scouts. In 1954, Baba met with Hidetoshi Genkawa of the Yomiuri Giants who invited Baba to drop out of high school and join the team full time. Baba accepted and began pitching for the Giants in January 1955 at #59.

== Professional baseball career ==
=== Yomiuri Giants (1955–1959) ===
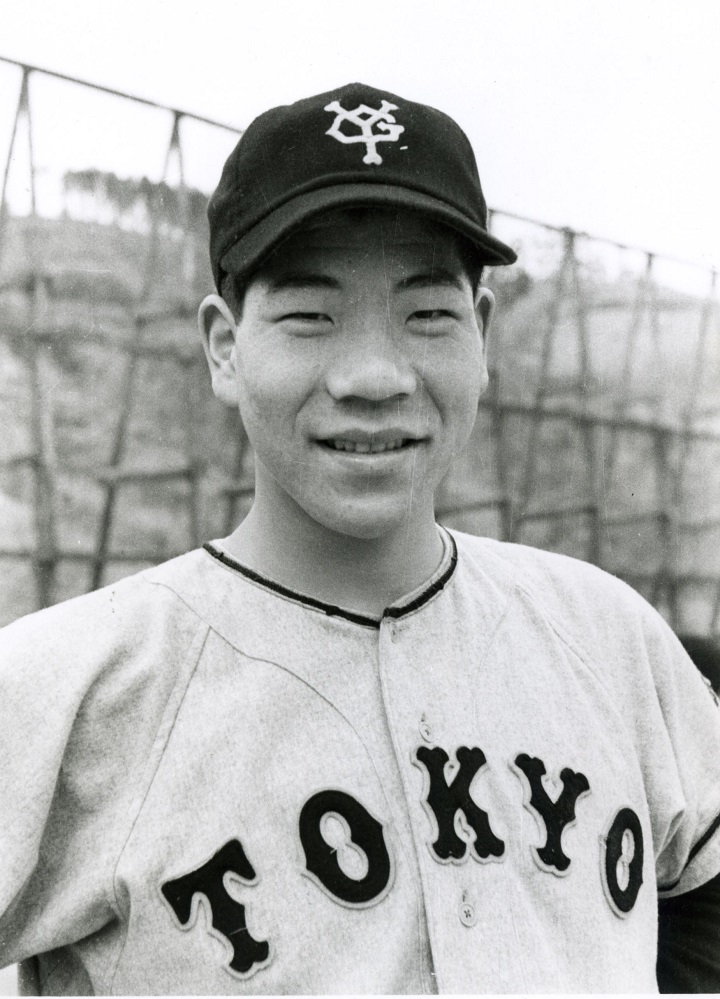
Baba during his rookie year with the Yomiuri Giants

Although Baba joined the Yomiuri Giants in 1955, he did not play in the league at all in his first year with the team by recommendation of director Shigeru Mizuhara. Baba was relegated to the second team for his first year, earning 12 wins and 1 loss in his rookie year and 13 wins and 2 losses in 1957. Both years, Baba won the Nippon Professional Baseball second team league's best pitcher award. However, at that time, professional baseball in Japan did not hold official games between the second team, and this career seems to be a lie. Baba began suffering eyesight problems in 1957 and was forced to take time off for surgery when it was discovered he had developed a brain tumour. Baba underwent craniotomy at the University of Tokyo Hospital on December 23, 1957. The success rate of the surgery at that time was very low, and the doctor warned Baba he was likely to lose his eyesight completely, however, the operation was successful, and Baba was discharged after a week. He returned to the camp with a bandage on his head in January 1958. Baba played for two more seasons. However, after Hideo Fujimoto, a coach who formed a bond with Baba and regularly advocated for him to start, left the team, Baba was released from the Giants in 1959 after five seasons.

=== Taiyo Whales (1960) ===
Fujimoto would leave for the Taiyo Whales, and invited Baba to a training camp in an attempt to get him signed in 1960. Baba was invited for a tryout by Goro Taniguchi and eventually hired, requiring him to move to Kawasaki, however, just days after moving, Baba fell in the bathroom of his new apartment and crashed directly into the glass door of the shower, which required 17 stitches in his left elbow and led to Baba losing feeling in his hand for a while. Despite the injury not being serious, Baba retired from baseball shortly after and moved back to Niigata.

== Professional wrestling career ==
=== Japan Pro Wrestling Alliance (1960–1972) ===
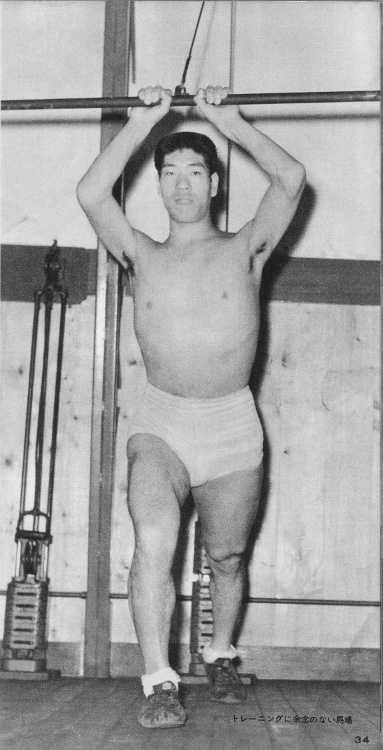
Baba training in 1962

Baba first met Rikidōzan while he was playing baseball, who told him he would do well as a professional wrestler. With his baseball career over, Baba decided to pursue professional wrestling. Meeting with Rikidōzan again in April 1960, Baba began training in the Japan Pro Wrestling Alliance (JWA) dojo along with Kanji "Antonio" Inoki, a Japanese emigrant whom Rikidōzan met during a trip to Brazil. Baba and Inoki debuted on the same show on September 30, 1960, with Baba beating Yonetaro Tanaka in his first match. In 1961, Rikidōzan arranged for Baba to wrestle and live in the United States for a few months. Baba became a popular villain in America, wrestling on the west coast as the fan favourite "'Big' Shohei Baba", and as the villainous "Baba the Giant" in New York. He wrestled the likes of The Destroyer and Buddy Rogers numerous times, as well as Bruno Sammartino for the WWWF World Heavyweight Championship in Madison Square Garden in February 1964.

While Baba was in America his trainer Rikidōzan died and the JWA began to struggle, and as a result Baba returned to Japan full time in 1966. He formed a popular tag team known as "B-I Cannon" with Inoki, and the two won the NWA International Tag Team Championship from Tarzan Tyler and Bill Watts in 1968, going on to hold the titles four times in total. Baba also held the NWA International Heavyweight Championship on three occasions, and won the World Big League a record six times. As the JWA continued to struggle going into the 1970s, Baba and Inoki agreed to go their own separate ways. Inoki attempted a hostile takeover of the JWA in late 1971, for which he was fired, whereas Baba decided not to renew his contract in 1972. The JWA would disband the following year.

=== All Japan Pro Wrestling (1972–1999) ===
==== PWF World Heavyweight Champion (1972–1985) ====
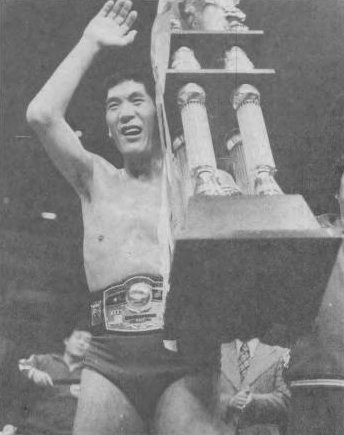
Baba after winning the NWA World Heavyweight Championship for the first time, c. 1974

After leaving JWA, Baba and Inoki formed their own promotions. Rikidōzan's two sons followed Baba to his new promotion and helped co-found it. Baba's All Japan Pro Wrestling debuted in October 1972, backed by Nippon Television. AJPW established the PWF Heavyweight Championship and Giant Baba as its top star, with Baba winning the Championship in 1973 and holding it for 1920 days, making 38 successful defences before losing to Tor Kamata in 1978. Baba won the NWA Worlds Heavyweight Championship from Jack Brisco ending Brisco's year and a half run as champion on December 2, 1974. A week later he dropped the title back to Brisco. Baba would regain the PWF Heavyweight Championship in America from Abdullah The Butcher in 1979, making another 13 successful defences before dropping the title to Harley Race in 1982. Baba would go on to hold the title four times for a total of 3,847 days, or just over ten years. Baba's runs with the title made him synonymous with it, and promoted him to a new level of stardom in Japan. Between his debut in 1960 and April 1984, Baba wrestled 3,000 consecutive matches and did not miss a single booking, only breaking the cycle after he suffered a minor neck injury.

While continuing to be the promotion's top star, Baba also put a focus on using foreign wrestlers, inviting the likes of Dory Funk, Bruiser Brody, Abdullah The Butcher and Stan Hansen to compete for All Japan from the very beginning. Baba also focused heavily on training the next generation of wrestlers, particularly Jumbo Tsuruta, who was his first student after forming AJPW, and Atsushi Onita, with whom Baba formed an almost parent-like bond.

==== Late career (1985–1998) ====
After losing the PWF Heavyweight Championship for the final time in 1985, Baba stepped back from the main event and instead focused on running the company while competing in lower-level matches, pushing Genichiro Tenryu and Jumbo Tsuruta as his successors. He did not abandon his rivalry with Inoki, and in 1987 notably wrestled a "Different Style Fight" as those wrestled by Inoki against real life martial artists in worked affairs. Baba faced the over 7 ft Raja Lion, an alleged karate champion from Pakistan, rumored to be actually a large man Baba found working in a restaurant, as a spoof on Inoki's matches.

Baba ran his company with a schedule of eight tours a year travelling nationwide, and maintained this the entire time he was in charge. Baba remained an extremely popular figure among fans, and continued teaming with young wrestlers and veterans in opening matches into the late 1990s, maintaining a full-time schedule until December 1998. Under Baba's rule, All Japan Pro Wrestling reached unprecedented heights of popularity in the 1990s, thanks to Baba's booking and the performances of Baba disciples Mitsuharu Misawa, Toshiaki Kawada, Akira Taue and Kenta Kobashi, dubbed the "Four Pillars of Heaven" by publications. With the Triple Crown Heavyweight Championship as the focal point, All Japan sold out more than 250 consecutive shows in Tokyo throughout the early to mid-1990s, routinely drawing houses in the $1,000,000 range eight times a year at Budokan Hall. At the peak of the company, tickets for the next Budokan show would be sold at the live event and completely sell out that night. In 1998, Baba finally agreed to run the Tokyo Dome on May 1, and despite it being a few years since the company peaked, they still drew 58,300 paying fans. It became well known that as a promoter, Baba would rather use a handshake agreement than a signed contract, as he had a great reputation for keeping his word when it came to match finishes and payrolls. Because of this, many regarded Baba as the most honest promoter in the professional-wrestling business.

Throughout 1998, it was becoming clearer and clearer that Baba's health was deteriorating. Despite this, he worked a full-time schedule throughout the year, touring the country and competing on most shows. However, Baba was slowly losing a tremendous amount of weight, and looked much more pale and weak compared to his previous self. His final match, prior to being confined to a hospital bed, occurred on December 5, 1998, at Nippon Budokan in Tokyo, where he teamed with Rusher Kimura and Mitsuo Momota to take on Masanobu Fuchi, Haruka Eigen, and Tsuyoshi Kikuchi, bringing his career total to 5,769 matches.

== Personal life ==
Little is known about Baba's life outside the ring. A reserved and private man, he did not drink or carouse with other wrestlers after shows. Baba was highly respected by foreign wrestlers, as he always made sure that they traveled first class and stayed in the best hotels, and paid for all of their beer and food. Although not a heavy or frequent drinker, Baba was known to have an incredible tolerance for alcohol and could consume it for hours without showing any effects. He was a heavy smoker who preferred cigars, but quit after his friend Gyutsu Matsuyama, another heavy smoker, was hospitalised with stomach cancer.

On September 16, 1971, he married Motoko Kawai (born January 2, 1940; often called "Mrs. Baba") in Hawaii, a place Baba enjoyed and regularly visited. Knowledge of their wedding was not widely publicized until almost ten years later, when they announced it at a press conference. A ceremony was held in 1983. Baba and his wife had no children fearing the child could also suffer from gigantism. Baba and his wife instead developed a close relationship with Baba's student Atsushi Onita who Baba considered like his own child; Baba and Motoko considered adopting Onita at one point. Onita has said "I learned the most important things as a human being from Mr. Baba".

Motoko died on April 14, 2018, from cirrhosis of the liver; she was 78 years old.

== Death ==
In January 1999, Baba was taken in to a hospital and confined to a bed. He saw his last wrestling match on January 22, as Toshiaki Kawada defeated Mitsuharu Misawa for the Triple Crown Heavyweight Championship. Nine days later on January 31, 1999, Baba died of liver failure from complications of colon cancer at approximately 16:04 local time in the Tokyo Medical University Hospital. He was 61 years old. Present at his deathbed were his wife, his older sister, his niece, All Japan ring announcer Ryu Nakada and senior referee Kyohei Wada.

Baba had known about his cancer diagnosis for at least a year prior to his death but kept it a secret, not wanting to cause worry about his condition. Baba's three closest employees, Jumbo Tsuruta, Mitsuharu Misawa and Joe Higuchi, did not know about it until after he died.

Baba's funeral was delayed due to the fact they could not find a casket large enough to fit his body. A memorial service was held publicly on April 17, 1999, at the Nippon Budokan the day after the 1999 Champion Carnival final. Over 28,000 people attended, including the entirety of the All Japan Pro Wrestling roster, as well as Baba's wife and family. His body was later cremated, and his tomb is located at Honmatsuji in Akashi City, Hyogo Prefecture.

== In popular culture ==
Baba appears in the manga and anime series Tiger Mask where he is a colleague and friend of Tiger Mask, Naoto Date.

== Championships and accomplishments ==
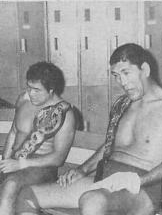
Baba (right) and Jumbo Tsuruta as NWA International Tag Team Champions, c. 1984

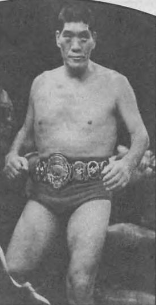
Baba as PWF World Heavyweight Champion, 1982

- All Japan Pro Wrestling
  - All Asia Heavyweight Championship (1 time)
  - NWA International Tag Team Championship (6 times) – with Jumbo Tsuruta
  - NWA World Heavyweight Championship (3 times)
  - PWF World Heavyweight Championship (4 times)
  - Champion Carnival (1973, 1974, 1975, 1977, 1978, 1981, 1982)
  - World's Strongest Tag Determination League (1978, 1980) – with Jumbo Tsuruta
  - World's Strongest Tag Determination League Distinguished Award (1977) – with Jumbo Tsuruta
  - World's Strongest Tag Determination League Skill Award (1985) – with Dory Funk Jr.
  - World's Strongest Tag Determination League Special Award (1988) – with Rusher Kimura
  - World's Strongest Tag Determination League East Sports Special Award (1991) – with Andre the Giant
- International Professional Wrestling Hall of Fame
  - Class of 2021
- Japan Wrestling Association
  - All Asia Tag Team Championship (3 times) – with Toyonobori
  - NWA International Heavyweight Championship (3 times)
  - NWA International Tag Team Championship (6 times) – with Michiaki Yoshimura (1), Antonio Inoki (4), and Seiji Sakaguchi (1)
  - World Big League (6 times)
- National Wrestling Alliance
  - NWA Hall of Fame (class of 2014)
- Nippon Professional Baseball
  - Best Pitcher (1956, 1957, 1959)
- NWA Detroit
  - NWA World Tag Team Championship (Detroit version) (1 time) – with Jumbo Tsuruta
- Pro Wrestling Illustrated
  - Ranked No. 26 of the top 500 singles wrestlers of the PWI Years in 2003
  - Ranked No. 10 of the top 100 tag teams of the PWI Years with Jumbo Tsuruta in 2003
- Professional Wrestling Hall of Fame and Museum
  - Class of 2008
- The Top 100 Historical Persons in Japan
  - Ranked the 91st greatest person from history by the people of Japan
- Tokyo Sports
  - 30th Anniversary Special Achievement Award (1990)
  - Best Tag Team Award (1978, 1980, 1982) with Jumbo Tsuruta
  - Lifetime Achievement Award (1999)
  - Match of the Year (1979) with Antonio Inoki vs. Abdullah The Butcher and Tiger Jeet Singh on August 26, 1979
  - Match of the Year (1980) with Jumbo Tsuruta vs. Terry Funk and Dory Funk Jr. on December 11, 1980
  - Match of the Year (1981) vs.Verne Gagne on January 18, 1981
  - Match of the Year (1982) vs. Stan Hansen on February 4, 1982
  - Outstanding Performance Award (1974, 1980)
  - Popularity Award (1976, 1988)
  - Special Award for breaking 5000 Matches (1993)
  - Special Grand Prize (1983)
  - Wrestler of the Year(1975, 1979)
- Wrestling Observer Newsletter
  - Best Booker(1989–1991)
  - Promoter of the Year (1990–1994)
  - Worst Tag Team (1990, 1991) with André the Giant
  - Wrestling Observer Newsletter Hall of Fame (Class of 1996)
