= Mitsuharu Misawa's championships and accomplishments =

This is a list of championships and accomplishments of Japanese professional wrestler Mitsuharu Misawa (1962–2009). Misawa debuted for All Japan Pro Wrestling (AJPW) in 1981 and adopted the Tiger Mask persona in 1984. Though initially known for his high-flying style, Misawa gained prominence after unmasking in May 1990, which led to his elevation as one of AJPW's top stars throughout the 1990s. Following a split from AJPW, he founded Pro Wrestling Noah, where he continued his success until his death during an in-ring accident in 2009. Throughout his career, Misawa received widespread acclaim from fans, peers, and wrestling publications both in Japan and internationally.

== By promotion ==
=== All Japan Pro Wrestling ===
- All Asia Tag Team Championship (2 times) – with Kenta Kobashi (1) and Yoshinari Ogawa (1)
- Triple Crown Heavyweight Championship (5 times)
- World Tag Team Championship (6 times) – with Toshiaki Kawada (2), Kenta Kobashi (2), Jun Akiyama (1) and Yoshinari Ogawa (1)
- NWA International Junior Heavyweight Championship (1 time)
- PWF World Tag Team Championship (1 time) – with Jumbo Tsuruta
- Champion Carnival (1995, 1998)
- World's Strongest Tag Determination League (1992, 1993, 1994, 1995) – with Toshiaki Kawada (1992), Kenta Kobashi (1993–1995)

=== Pro Wrestling Noah ===
- GHC Heavyweight Championship (3 times)
- GHC Tag Team Championship (2 times) – with Yoshinari Ogawa
- Global Tag League (2009) – with Go Shiozaki

== Awards ==
=== International Professional Wrestling Hall of Fame ===
- Class of 2023

=== Nikkan Sports ===
- Match of the Year (2007) with Jun Akiyama vs. Kenta Kobashi and Yoshihiro Takayama on December 2
- Wrestler of the Year (2007, 2009)

=== Pro Wrestling Illustrated ===
- Ranked No. 2 of the top 500 singles wrestlers in the PWI 500 in 1997

=== Tokyo Sports ===
- Fighting Spirit Award (1985, 1990)
- Lifetime Achievement Award (2009)
- Match of the Year Award (1995) with Kenta Kobashi vs. Toshiaki Kawada and Akira Taue on June 9
- Match of the Year Award (1997) vs. Kenta Kobashi on October 21
- Match of the Year Award (1998) vs. Kenta Kobashi on October 31
- Match of the Year Award (2003) vs. Kenta Kobashi on March 1
- Match of the Year Award (2007) with Jun Akiyama vs. Kenta Kobashi and Yoshihiro Takayama on December 2
- Outstanding Performance Award (1997)
- Rookie of the Year (1982)
- Special Grand Prize (1992)
- Tag Team of the Year (1991) with Toshiaki Kawada
- Tag Team of the Year (1993, 1994) with Kenta Kobashi
- Wrestler of the Year (2007)

=== Wrestling Observer Newsletter ===
- Best Flying Wrestler (1985, 1986)
- Best Wrestling Maneuver (1985) Topé con Giro
- Feud of the Year (1990, 1991) vs. Jumbo Tsuruta
- Match of the Year (1985) vs. Kuniaki Kobayashi on June 21
- Match of the Year (1996) with Jun Akiyama vs. Steve Williams and Johnny Ace on June 7
- Match of the Year (1998) vs. Kenta Kobashi on October 31
- Match of the Year (1999) vs. Kenta Kobashi on June 11
- Match of the Year (2003) vs. Kenta Kobashi on March 1
- Most Outstanding Wrestler (1997, 1999)
- Most Underrated Wrestler (1988)
- Tag Team of the Year (1991) with Toshiaki Kawada
- Tag Team of the Year (1995) with Kenta Kobashi
- Tag Team of the Year (1996, 1997) with Jun Akiyama
- Wrestler of the Year (1995, 1997, 1999)
- Wrestling Observer Newsletter Hall of Fame (Class of 1996)
