= PWF World Heavyweight Championship =

Wrestling championship

Pacific Wrestling Federation (PWF) World Heavyweight Championship
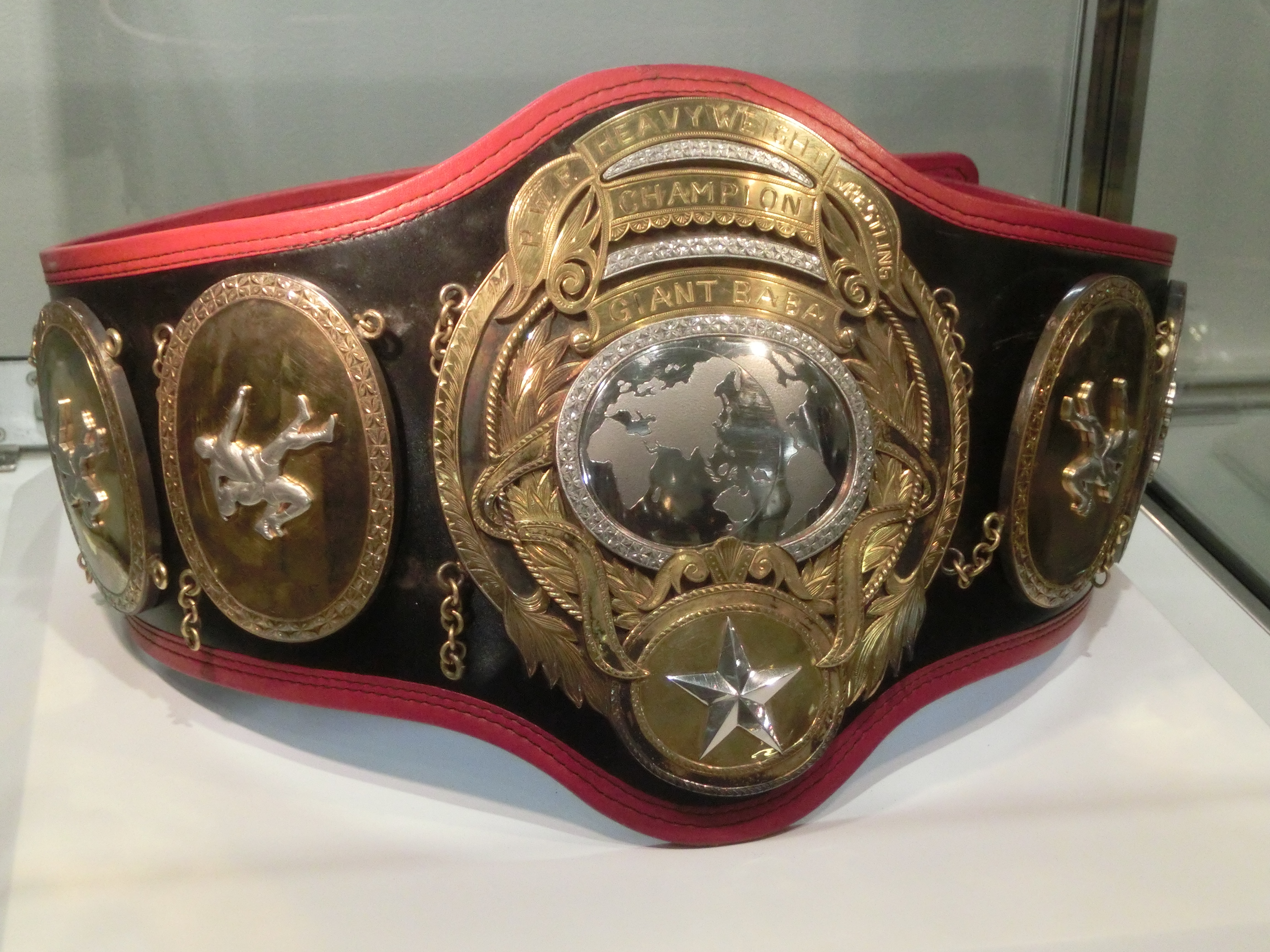
- The PWF Heavyweight Championship belt

Details
- Promotion: All Japan Pro Wrestling
- Date established: February 27, 1973
- Date retired: 1989
Statistics
- First champion: Giant Baba
- Most reigns: Stan Hansen/Giant Baba (4 reigns)
- Longest reign: Giant Baba (1920 days)
- Shortest reign: Jumbo Tsuruta (<1 day)

The Pacific Wrestling Federation (PWF) World Heavyweight Championship is a professional wrestling world heavyweight championship and one of the three titles that make up the Triple Crown Heavyweight Championship. It was created in 1973 by All Japan owner Giant Baba, after he won a series of ten matches against Bruno Sammartino (twice - one win, one draw), Terry Funk, Abdullah the Butcher, The Destroyer, Wilbur Snyder (twice - one win, one draw), Don Leo Jonathan, Pat O'Connor and Bobo Brazil.

The title, which had originally been classed as a world title, was downgraded to regional status after All Japan joined the National Wrestling Alliance but retained its status as the top All Japan singles title until 1983. In 1989 Jumbo Tsuruta and Stan Hansen would unify this, the NWA United National Championship and the NWA International Heavyweight title to create the Triple Crown Heavyweight Championship. The original belt remained in use as part of the Triple Crown until 2013, when the three belts were replaced by a single belt. As the original top belt in All Japan, its design formed the front plate of the new belt; the other two belts' designs took the sides.

== Title history ==
Key

Symbol	Meaning
No.	The overall championship reign
Reign	The reign number for the specific wrestler listed.
Event	The event in which the championship changed hands
N/A	The specific information is not known
—	Used for vacated reigns in order to not count it as an official reign
[Note #]	Indicates that the exact length of the title reign is unknown, with a note providing more details.

#	Wrestler	Reign	Date	Days held	Location	Event	Notes	Ref.
Pacific Wrestling Federation (PWF)
1	Giant Baba	1	February 27, 1973	1,920	Tokyo, Japan	Giant Series Total War day 11	Baba originally defeated The Destroyer on December 19, 1972 via count out; dissatisfied with the result, Baba decided to earn the championship by winning a series of 10 matches, with the last against Bobo Brazil.	
2	Tor Kamata	1	June 1, 1978	11	Akita, Japan	Super Power Series day 6		
3	Billy Robinson	1	June 12, 1978	128	Ichinomiya, Japan	Super Power Series day 6		
4	Abdullah the Butcher	1	October 18, 1978	115	Utsunomiya, Japan	Giant Series day 12		
5	Giant Baba	2	February 10, 1979	1,354	Chicago, Illinois, United States	House show	This was an AWA event.	
6	Harley Race	1	October 26, 1982	108	Obihiro, Japan	Giant Series day 21		
7	Giant Baba	3	February 11, 1983	209	St. Louis, Missouri, United States	House show		
8	Stan Hansen	1	September 8, 1983	327	Chiba, Japan	Super Power Series tag 18		
9	Giant Baba	4	July 31, 1984	364	Tokyo, Japan	Grand Champion Carnival III day 22		
10	Stan Hansen	2	July 30, 1985	249	Fukuoka, Japan	85 Heat Wave! Summer Action Wars day 29		
11	Riki Choshu	1	April 5, 1986	(Note: The exact date the championship was vacated is uncertain, which put the championship reign at between 330 and 360 days.)	Yokohama, Japan	Champion Carnival day 8	Hansen's AWA World Heavyweight Championship was also on the line. The match ended in a disqualification. Because the PWF Championship could be won by disqualification but the AWA Championship could not, Choshu only won the PWF Championship.	
-	Vacated	-	March 1987	-	N/A	N/A	Vacated when Choshu left for New Japan Pro-Wrestling.	
12	Stan Hansen	3	April 24, 1987	320	Yokohama, Japan	Champion Carnival day 24	Defeated Hiroshi Wajima in a decision match.	
13	Genichiro Tenryu	1	March 9, 1988	140	Yokohama, Japan	Excite Series day 15	Tenryu also held the NWA United National Championship at this point in time	
14	Stan Hansen	4	July 27, 1988	265	Nagano, Japan	Summer Action Series day 20	Won the PWF World Heavyweight and NWA United National Championship.	
15	Jumbo Tsuruta	1	April 18, 1989	0	Tokyo, Japan	Champion Carnival day 21	Tsuruta was the NWA International Heavyweight Champion.	
-	Unified	-	April 18, 1989	-	Tokyo, Japan	Champion Carnival day 21	The PWF World Heavyweight Championship, NWA International Heavyweight Championship and NWA United National Championship unified to become the Triple Crown Heavyweight Championship.	

== Combined reigns ==
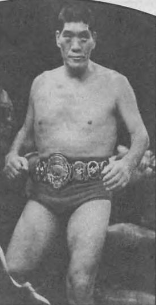
Giant Baba as PWF World Heavyweight Champion, 1982

Rank	Wrestler	No. of reigns	Combined days
1	Giant Baba	4	3,847
2	Stan Hansen	4	1,161
3	Riki Choshu	1	330 - 360
4	Genichiro Tenryu	1	140
5	Billy Robinson	1	128
6	Abdullah the Butcher	1	115
7	Harley Race	1	108
8	Tor Kamata	1	11
9	Jumbo Tsuruta	1	<1

== See also ==
- PWF World Tag Team Championship
- PWF United States Heavyweight Championship
- PWF All Asia Heavyweight Championship
- NWA United National Championship
- Triple Crown Heavyweight Championship
- NWA International Heavyweight Championship

== Footnotes ==
Sporting positions
Preceded by NWA Worlds Heavyweight Championship	All Japan Pro Wrestling's top heavyweight championship 1986–1989	Succeeded by Triple Crown Heavyweight Championship
