= Kurt Beyer =

American professional wrestler

Personal information
- Born: September 23, 1960 (age 65) Buffalo, New York, United States
- Education: University of San Francisco
- Family: Billy Red Lyons (uncle)

Professional wrestling career
- Ring name: Kurt Beyer
- Billed height: 1.90 m (6 ft 3 in)
- Billed weight: 101 kg (223 lb) - 114 kg (251 lb)
- Trained by: Kenta Kobashi
- Debut: January 17, 1993

Kurt Beyer (born September 23, 1960) is a semi-retired American professional wrestler who competed in Japanese and international promotions during the 1990s, most notably teaming with his father The Destroyer (Dick Beyer) during his last tour with All Japan Pro Wrestling in 1993.

== Early life ==
Born in Buffalo, New York, Beyer was raised in Akron and later accompanied his father as he toured the country with the National Wrestling Alliance during the 1960s. Growing up around wrestlers such as brothers Maurice & Paul Vachon, Red Bastien, George Steele Nick Bockwinkel and his uncle Billy Red Lyons, he would at one point have to be looked after by the time keeper after twice jumping the guardrail to help his father during a match against Mr. Moto in 1964.

Later, moving to Tokyo, Japan when his father began wrestling full-time for All Japan Pro Wrestling, he would later become involved in amateur wrestling and won the Far East Heavyweight Championship in 1979.

After graduating from the University of San Francisco, Beyer became involved in journalism, eventually becoming a writer and editor for The Daily Yomiuri as well as working in advertising for the Tokyo-based corporation Odyssey, Inc.

== Career ==
In 1990, the then 30-year-old Beyer left Tokyo and began training at his father's wrestling school The Destroyer Pro-Wrestling Academy in New York and later under Kenta Kobashi at All Japan Professional Wrestling dojo. One of the few foreigners allowed to attend the dojo, the school is well known for its strict training schedules which included 1,000+ sit-ups, 500 back extensions, 1,000+ push-ups, 500 squats, hours of sparring and 300 to 500 "bumps" (body slams, back drops, etc.), daily.

Making his debut in All-Japan Pro Wrestling in January 1993, he began wrestling regularly at Tokyo's Budokan Hall feuding with Dory Funk, Jr. losing to him on February 28 and, teaming with Al Perez, lost to Dan Kroffat & Doug Furnas on June 1, 1993.

The ultimate highlight of Kurt Beyer's professional wrestling career came when he served as The Destroyer's tag-team partner for his father's last three matches in Kanagawa, Yokohama and, finally, Tokyo defeating Masao Inoue, Haruka Eigen and Masa Fuchi in a 6-man tag team match with The Destroyer and Giant Baba at a sold-out Budokan arena on July 29, 1993. The match, which featured the first father-son tag team match in Japanese wrestling history, was extensively covered by the Japanese media.

The following year, he participated in the 1994 Summer Action Series as part of the 10-man American contingent which included Tom Zenk, Terry "Bam Bam" Gordy and his nephew Richard Slinger, "Dr. Death" Steve Williams, The Eagle, Johnny Smith, Abdullah the Butcher, Giant Kimala II and Johnny Ace. During the series, he and Zenk lost to Terry Gordy and Richard Slinger in front of a sold out 2,700 crowd in Kurashiki on July 19 and, two days later, lost to Tom Zenk in a singles match at the Korakuen Hall.

Teaming with Zenk, the two would lose to Jun Akiyama & Tamon Honda at the Shimazu Gym on June 22. Beyer then teamed with Terry Gordy and Richard Slinger in a 6-man tag team match, defeating Tom Zenk, The Eagle and Johnny Smith at Budokan Hall on July 28 in the final event of the tour.

During the 1990s, he also feuded with Franz Schumann over the CWA Middleweight Championship while in the Catch Wrestling Association before losing to Schumann in Bremen, Germany.

== Recent years ==
Returning to the United States during the early 2000s, he made several appearances appearing with IAW Wrestling winning the IAW Television Championship from "Flying" Andy Chene in late 2002 before losing the title back to Chene at the supercard "Clash at the Cove" in South Bend, Indiana on July 12, 2003. The show would also feature "Hacksaw" Jim Duggan, The Barbarian and manager Bobby "The Brain" Heenan.

The following year, Beyer competed in a match at the Stanley Coveleski Regional Stadium in South Bend on July 10, 2004 and, the following year, lost in a rematch to Andy Chene on June 25, 2005.

== Championships and accomplishments ==
- IAW Wrestling

- IAW Television Championship (1 time)
