= Jumbo Tsuruta =

Japanese professional wrestler (1951–2000)

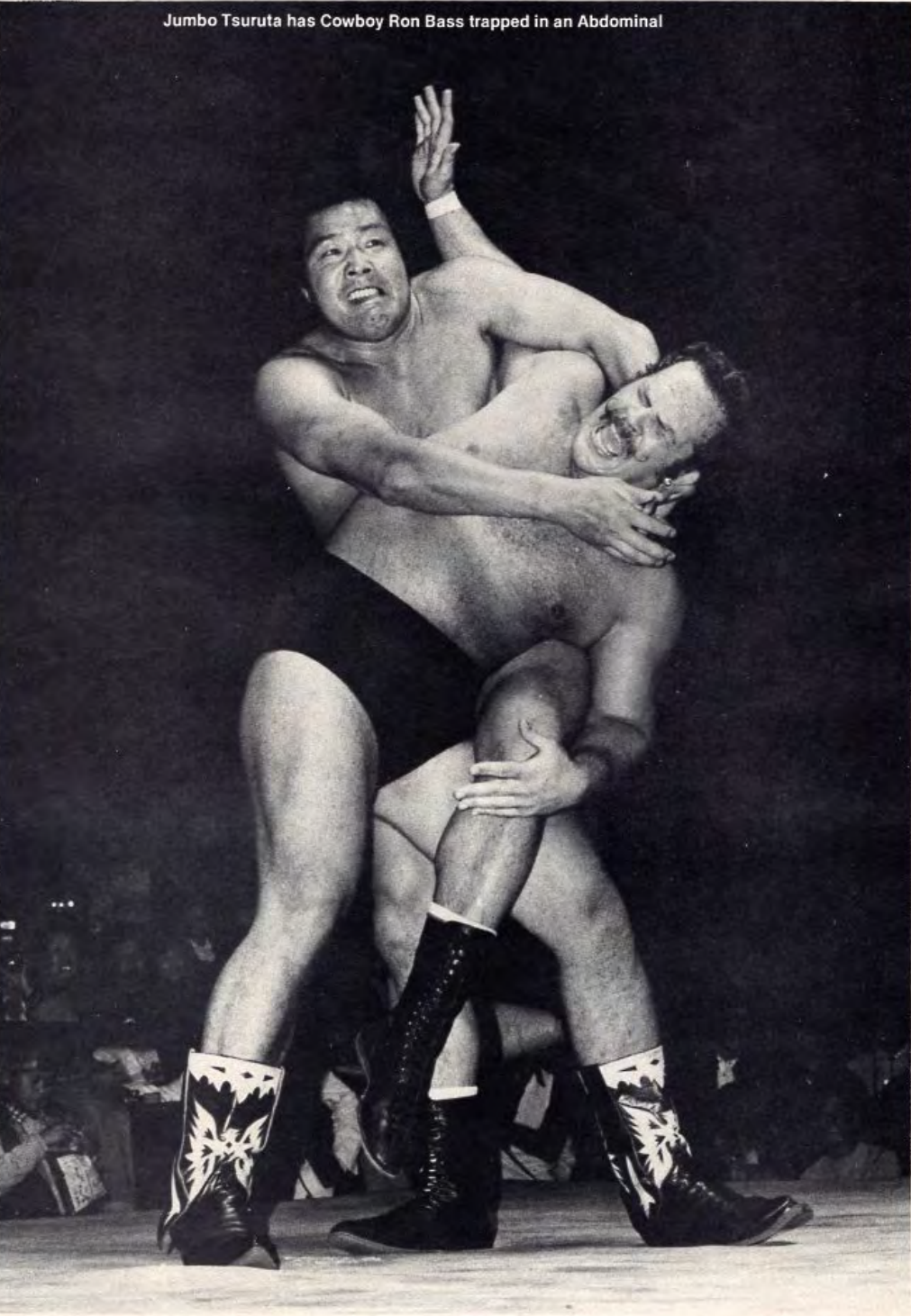
- Jumbo Tsuruta (top) applies an abdominal stretch on Ron Bass (bottom), circa 1984

Personal information
- Born: Tomomi Tsuruta; March 25, 1951 Yamanashi, Yamanashi, Japan
- Died: May 12, 2000 (aged 49) Quezon City, Metro Manila, Philippines
- Cause of death: Complications from liver transplant
- Education: Chuo University

Professional wrestling career
- Ring name(s): Jumbo Tsuruta; Tommy Tsuruta; The Terror of Yamanashi
- Billed height: 1.90 m (6 ft 3 in)
- Billed weight: 130 kg (287 lb)
- Trained by: Dory Funk Jr. Lou Thesz; All Japan Pro Wrestling
- Debut: March 24, 1973
- Retired: February 20, 1999

Tomomi "Tommy" Tsuruta (鶴田 友美, Tsuruta Tomomi; March 25, 1951 – May 12, 2000), better known by his ring name Jumbo Tsuruta (ジャンボ鶴田, Janbo Tsuruta), was a Japanese professional wrestler who wrestled for All Japan Pro Wrestling (AJPW) for most of his career, and is well known for being the first ever Triple Crown Heavyweight Champion, having won the PWF Heavyweight Championship, the NWA United National Championship, and the NWA International Heavyweight Championship, and unifying the three titles. He is also known for being one-half of the first World Tag Team Champions with Yoshiaki Yatsu, having won the NWA International Tag Team Championship and the PWF Tag Team Championship, and unifying the two titles.

== Early life ==
Tsuruta participated in many sports, such as swimming, basketball, and sumo, while attending Hikawa Senior High School in Yamanashi-shi, Yamanashi Prefecture.

== Amateur wrestling career ==
While at Chuo University, he began an amateur wrestling career. He won the All Japan Amateur Wrestling Championship in freestyle and Greco-Roman as a superheavyweight (at the time, an unlimited class for those weighing over 100 kilograms) in the years 1971 and 1972.

He also competed in the 1972 Summer Olympics in Munich. He finished the Greco-Roman tournament with no wins.

== Professional wrestling career ==
Scouted by AJPW promoter Giant Baba, he was sent to the local Amarillo, Texas, promotion in the U.S. to train as a pro under Dory Funk Jr. Known as "Tommy Tsuruta", he worked in several major NWA territories including Detroit, St. Louis, and Florida as well as West Texas. He was among the first Japanese wrestlers to be cheered by an American crowd, due to his hard work ethic and wrestling ability. The name "Jumbo" was given to him by a fan contest in Japan to replace his first name, which was seen as too feminine. He defeated Nick Bockwinkel on February 23, 1984, to win the AWA World Heavyweight Championship in Tokyo, Japan. He lost the title to Rick Martel on May 13, 1984, in St. Paul, Minnesota. Tsuruta and Yoshiaki Yatsu became the first World Tag Team Champions on June 10, 1988.

During his 26-year career, he fought in 3,329 matches. Some of his most notable opponents include Billy Robinson, Mil Máscaras, The Destroyer, Abdullah the Butcher, Dory Funk Jr., Terry Funk, Jack Brisco, Harley Race, Ric Flair, Verne Gagne, Nick Bockwinkel, Rick Martel, Bruiser Brody, Stan Hansen, Riki Choshu, Genichiro Tenryu, and Mitsuharu Misawa. Tsuruta was the first Triple Crown Heavyweight Champion (unifying the Pacific Wrestling Federation, NWA United National, and NWA International Heavyweight titles), defeating Stan Hansen on April 18, 1989, in Tokyo.

In 1992, he completed the October "Giant Series" tour before disappearing from the company for almost a year due to Hepatitis C. For the rest of his career, he participated mostly in comedic (i.e. exhibition) six-man tag team matches; he frequently teamed with Baba and old rival Rusher Kimura in matches against teams which included Masanobu Fuchi, Haruka Eigen, and other old-timers. Tsuruta's last match was on September 11, 1998 in a six man tag. He announced his retirement on February 20, 1999, and held a ceremony on March 6, 1999.

== Post-retirement and death ==
Four days after Tsuruta's retirement, he moved with his family to the United States to be a visiting researcher at the University of Portland in Oregon. Tsuruta had a bachelor's degree in political science and earned a master's degree in coaching in 1997, later becoming a part-time instructor in physical training at his old University.

His health deteriorated, however, as he had been diagnosed with Hepatitis B in the summer of 1992 which eventually turned to full blown liver cancer as well as cirrhosis of the liver, and by the end of the year he was back in Japan. Due to strict laws over organ donation in Japan, meaning only relatives with matching blood types can donate, Tsuruta had to try and find a donor elsewhere. In April 2000, he left for Australia in search of a liver donor, and two months later, a donor was found in Manila in the Philippines. Tsuruta underwent surgery on May 12, but during the liver transplant he began bleeding uncontrollably, and died at the National Kidney and Transplant Institute in Quezon City, Philippines on May 12, 2000, from complications of the liver transplant at the age of 49.

== Championships and accomplishments ==
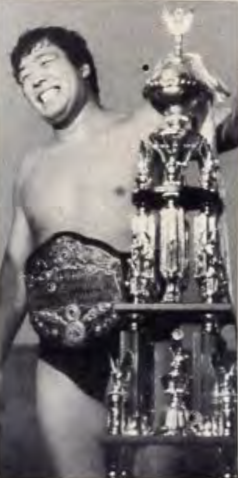
Tsuruta after winning the AWA World Heavyweight Championship, c. 1984

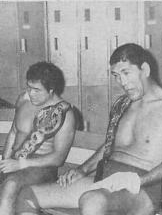
Tsuruta (left) and Giant Baba as NWA International Tag Team Champions, c. 1984

- All Japan Pro Wrestling
  - NWA International Heavyweight Championship (3 times)
  - NWA United National Championship (5 times)
  - PWF World Heavyweight Championship (1 time)
  - NWA International Tag Team Championship (9 times) – Giant Baba (6), Genichiro Tenryu (2), and Yoshiaki Yatsu (1)
  - PWF World Tag Team Championship (2 times) – Tiger Mask II (1) and Yoshiaki Yatsu (1)
  - Triple Crown Heavyweight Championship (3 times)
  - World Tag Team Championship (7 times) – Yoshiaki Yatsu (5), The Great Kabuki (1), and Akira Taue (1)
  - Champion Carnival (1980, 1991)
  - World's Strongest Tag Determination League (1978, 1980) – with Giant Baba
  - World's Strongest Tag Determination League (1984, 1986) – with Genichiro Tenryu
  - World's Strongest Tag Determination League (1987) – with Yoshiaki Yatsu
  - January 2 Korakuen Hall Heavyweight Battle Royal (1984)
  - Champion Carnival Distinguished Service Award (1977, 1979)
  - Champion Carnival Technical Award (1978)
  - Champion Carnival Technique Award (1976)
  - Champion Carnival Fighting Spirit Award (1975, 1982)
  - World's Strongest Tag Determination League Distinguished Award (1977) - with Giant Baba
  - World's Strongest Tag Determination League Outstanding Performance Award (1982) – with Giant Baba
  - World's Strongest Tag Determination League Technical Award (1983) – with Genichiro Tenryu
  - World's Strongest Tag Determination League Distinguished Service Medal Award (1985) – with Genichiro Tenryu
  - World's Strongest Tag Determination League Outstanding Performance Award (1988) – with Yoshiaki Yatsu
  - World's Strongest Tag Determination League Special Award (1989)
  - World's Strongest Tag Determination League Skill Award (1990) – with Akira Taue
  - World's Strongest Tag Determination League Fighting Spirit Award (1991) – with Akira Taue
- American Wrestling Association
  - AWA World Heavyweight Championship (1 time)
- Championship Wrestling from Florida
  - NWA United National Championship (1 time)
- NWA Detroit
  - NWA World Tag Team Championship (Detroit version) (1 time) – with Giant Baba
- Pro Wrestling Illustrated
  - Ranked No. 28 of the 500 best singles wrestlers during the PWI Years in 2003
  - Ranked No. 10 of the 100 best tag teams during the PWI Years with Giant Baba in 2003
  - Ranked No. 14 of the 100 best tag teams during the PWI Years with Genichiro Tenryu in 2003
  - Ranked No. 31 of the 100 best tag teams during the PWI Years with Yoshiaki Yatsu in 2003
- Professional Wrestling Hall of Fame
  - Class of 2015
- Tokyo Sports
  - Wrestler of the Year (1983, 1984, 1991)
  - Technique Award (1974, 1986, 1988)
  - Outstanding Performance Award (1975, 1976, 1981)
  - Service Award (1999)
  - Lifetime Achievement Award (2000)
  - Tag Team of the Year (1978, 1980, 1982) with Giant Baba
  - Tag Team of the Year (1983, 1985) with Genichiro Tenryu
  - Tag Team of the Year (1989) with Yoshiaki Yatsu
  - Match of the Year (1976) vs. Rusher Kimura on March 28, 1976
  - Match of the Year (1977) vs. Mil Máscaras on August 25, 1977
  - Match of the Year (1978) vs. Harley Race on January 20, 1978
  - Match of the Year (1980) with Giant Baba vs. Dory Funk Jr. and Terry Funk on December 11, 1980
  - Match of the Year (1985) vs. Riki Choshu on November 4, 1985
  - Match of the Year (1987) vs. Genichiro Tenryu on August 31, 1987
  - Match of the Year (1989) vs. Genichiro Tenryu on June 5, 1989
- Wrestling Observer Newsletter
  - Feud of the Year (1990, 1991) vs. Mitsuharu Misawa
  - Wrestler of the Year (1991)
  - Wrestling Observer Newsletter Hall of Fame (Class of 1996)

== See also ==
- List of premature professional wrestling deaths
