= PWF United States Heavyweight Championship =

Details
- Promotion: All Japan Pro Wrestling; Pacific Wrestling Federation

The Pacific Wrestling Federation (PWF) United States Heavyweight Championship is a former title defended in All Japan Pro Wrestling.

== Creation of the title ==
The title was established in 1970 when The Destroyer, who held the Hawaii version of the NWA North American Heavyweight Championship, had the belt which would become the PWF United States Championship made to replace the original North American title belt, which had fallen into disrepair. The Destroyer then embarked on a world tour, on which he was billed as United States Champion. The title ended up becoming an official Pacific Wrestling Federation title later on, and was retired in 1979 when Destroyer decided to return to the United States.

== Title history ==
#	Wrestler	Reign	Date	Days held	Location	Event	Notes	Ref.
All Japan Pro Wrestling (AJPW)
1	The Destroyer	1	December 1970	1 - 30	N/A	N/A	See: Creation of the title.	
2	Peter Maivia	1	December 1970	1 - 30	Samoa	House show		
3	The Destroyer	2	December 1970	1,746 - 1,776	n/a	House show	Destroyer began defending the title in Japan in 1972 and the championship became an official PWF title in 1974.	
Pacific Wrestling Federation (PWF)
4	Abdullah the Butcher	1	October 12, 1975	52	Osaka, Japan	House show		
5	The Destroyer	3	December 3, 1975	312	Kiryu, Japan	House show		
-	Vacated	-	October 10, 1976	N/A	N/A	N/A	Title was held up after a match between The Destroyer and Abdullah the Butcher.	
6	The Destroyer	4	October 28, 1976	659	Tokyo, Japan	House show	Defeated Abdullah in a rematch to win the held up title.	
7	Mil Máscaras	1	August 18, 1978	24	Kagoshima, Japan	House show		
8	The Destroyer	5	September 11, 1978	277	Morioka, Japan	House show		
-	Abandoned	-	June 15, 1979	N/A	N/A	N/A	The Destroyer returned to the United States after June 14, 1979 and the title was retired.	

== Combined reigns ==
Rank	Wrestler	No. of reigns	Combined days
1	The Destroyer	5	2.995-3.054
2	Abdullah the Butcher	1	52
3	Mil Máscaras	1	24
4	Peter Maivia	1	1-30

== See also ==
- All Japan Pro Wrestling
- PWF Heavyweight Championship
- PWF Tag Team Championship
