= NWA United National Championship =

Professional wrestling title

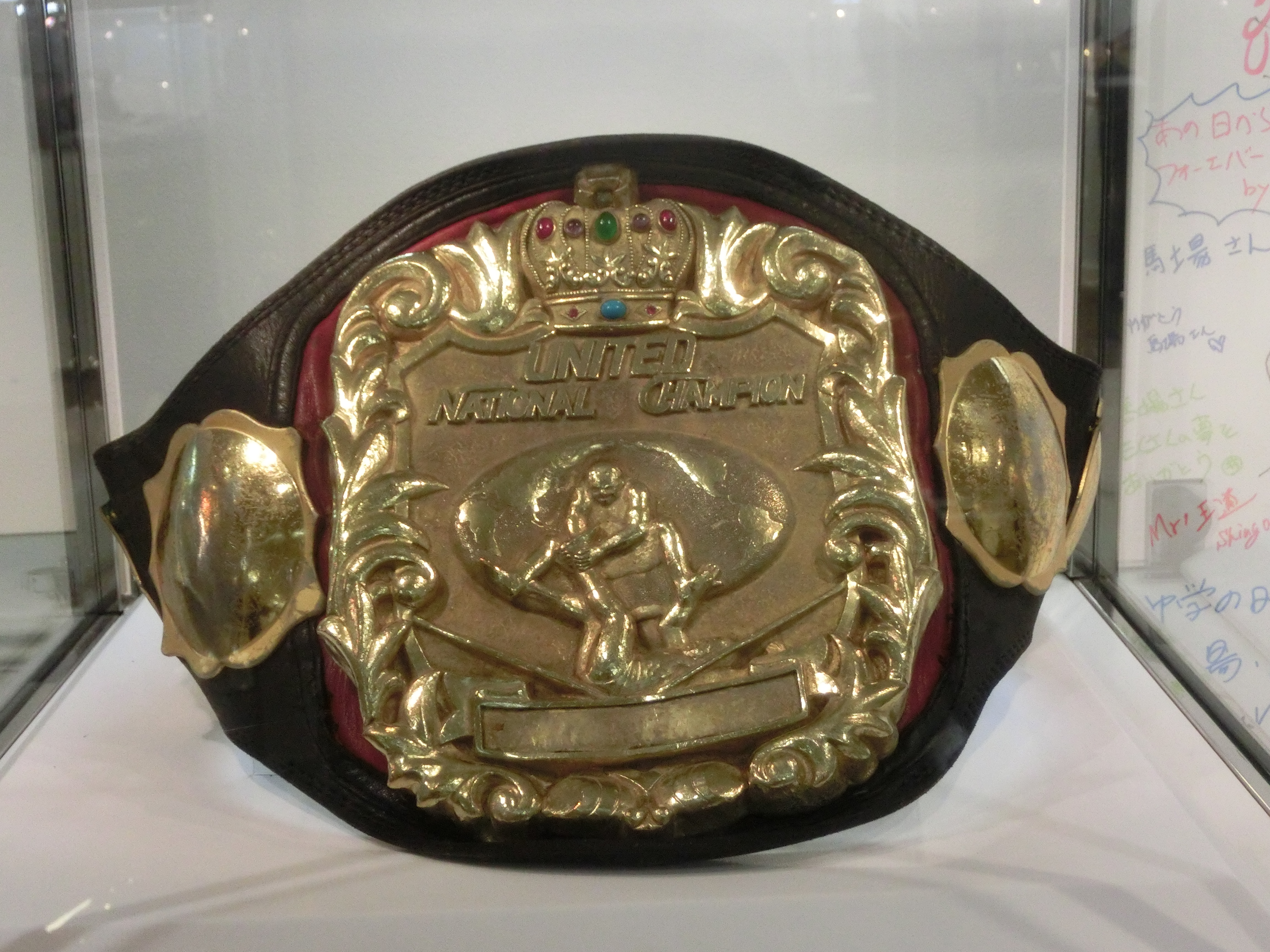
- The NWA United National Championship belt

Details
- Promotion: NWA Los Angeles; Japan Pro Wrestling Alliance; All Japan Pro Wrestling
Statistics
- First champion: Dale Lewis
- Final champion: Jumbo Tsuruta
- Most reigns: Jumbo Tsuruta (6 reigns)
- Longest reign: Jumbo Tsuruta (1,067 days)

The NWA United National Championship (often abbreviated to UN Championship) was a professional wrestling championship sanctioned by the National Wrestling Alliance, and best known for being defended in All Japan Pro Wrestling. It was unified into the Triple Crown Heavyweight Championship, along with the PWF World Heavyweight Championship and the NWA International Heavyweight Championship, in 1989. The original belt remained in use for the Triple Crown until 2013.

== Title history ==
Symbol	Meaning
No.	The overall championship reign
Reign	The reign number for the specific wrestler listed.
Event	The event in which the championship changed hands
N/A	The specific information is not known
—	Used for vacated reigns in order to not count it as an official reign
[Note #]	Indicates that the exact length of the title reign is unknown, with a note providing more details.

#	Wrestler	Reign	Date	Days held	Location	Notes
1	Dale Lewis	1	October 1970	(Note: The exact date that Dale Lewis won the championship is uncertain, which puts the title reign at between 0 and 22 days.)		Won a tournament to crown the first champion.
2	Pantera Negra	1	October 23, 1970	28	Los Angeles, CA	
3	John Tolos	1	November 20, 1970	14	Los Angeles, CA	
4	Ray Mendoza	1	December 4, 1970	(Note: The exact date that John Tolos won the championship is uncertain, which puts the title reign at between 87 and 112 days.)	Los Angeles, CA	
5	John Tolos	2	March 1971	(Note: The exact date that John Tolos won the championship is uncertain, which puts the title reign at between 0 and 25 days.)	N/A	Tolos returned the championship when the NWA decided the referee used a fast count during his title defense against Mendoza.
6	Antonio Inoki	1	March 26, 1971	262	Los Angeles, CA	
-	Vacated	-	December 13, 1971	-	N/A	Vacated on December 13, 1971, when Inoki is fired from the JWA, the promotion to which he had brought the title from the United States.
7	King Krow	1	January 1972	(Note: The exact date that King Krow won the championship is uncertain, which puts the title reign at between 11 and 41 days.)	Vancouver, British Columbia, Canada	Defeated Sailor Thomas in a fictitious tournament final.
8	Seiji Sakaguchi	1	February 11, 1972	208	Los Angeles, CA	
9	The Sheik	1	September 6, 1972	1	Tokyo, Japan	
10	Seiji Sakaguchi	2	September 7, 1972	149	Osaka, Japan	
11	Johnny Valentine	1	February 3, 1973	33	Yokohama, Japan	
12	Akihisa Takachiho	1	March 8, 1973	37	Sano, Japan	
-	Deactivated	-	April 14, 1973	-	N/A	Deactivated on April 14, 1973, when the JWA closed.
13	Jumbo Tsuruta	1	August 28, 1976	189	Tokyo, Japan	Defeated Jack Brisco in an AJPW tournament final to revive the championship.
14	Billy Robinson	1	March 5, 1977	18	Akita, Japan	
15	Jumbo Tsuruta	2	March 23, 1977	1,067	Miami, FL	
16	Dick Murdoch	1	February 23, 1980	11	Kagoshima, Japan	
17	Jumbo Tsuruta	3	March 5, 1980	222	Kuroiso, Japan	
18	Abdullah the Butcher	1	October 13, 1980	101	Nagoya, Japan	
19	Jumbo Tsuruta	4	January 22, 1981	556	Nirasaki, Japan	
20	Harley Race	1	August 1, 1982	84	Tokyo, Japan	
21	Jumbo Tsuruta	5	October 24, 1982	236	Kitami, Japan	
-	Vacated	-	June 17, 1983	-	N/A	Vacated on June 17, 1983, so Tsuruta could focus on defending the NWA International Heavyweight Championship.
22	Ted DiBiase	1	October 14, 1983	106	Sasebo, Japan	Defeated Jerry Lawler in a tournament final via forfeit; wrestled Genichiro Tenryu for his first title defense instead.
23	Michael Hayes	1	January 28, 1984	6	Athens, GA	
24	David Von Erich	1	February 3, 1984	7	Dallas, TX	
-	Vacated	-	February 10, 1984	-	N/A	Vacated on February 10, 1984, when Von Erich dies of an apparent heart attack.
25	Genichiro Tenryu	1	February 23, 1984	(Note: The exact date that Genichiro Tenryu vacated the championship is uncertain, which puts the title reign at between 709 and 736 days.)	Tokyo, Japan	Defeated Ricky Steamboat in a tournament final.
-	Vacated	-	February 1986	-	N/A	Voluntarily vacated in February 1986 when Tenryu is pinned by Yoshiaki Yatsu in a tag team match.
26	Genichiro Tenryu	2	April 26, 1986	823	Ōmiya-ku, Japan	Defeated Ted DiBiase in a tournament final. Tenryu won the PWF Heavyweight Championship on March 9, 1988.
27	Stan Hansen	1	July 27, 1988	265	Nagano, Japan	Also won the PWF Heavyweight Championship.
28	Jumbo Tsuruta	6	April 18, 1989	0	Tokyo, Japan	Retained the NWA International Heavyweight Championship and won the PWF Heavyweight Championship and the UN Championship.
-	Unified	-	April 18, 1989	-	N/A	Title was unified with Tsuruta's NWA International Heavyweight Championship and with Hansen's PWF Heavyweight Championship and UN championship to create the Triple Crown Heavyweight Championship.

== Combined reigns ==
Rank	Wrestler	No. of reigns	Combined days
1	Jumbo Tsuruta	6	2,270
2	Genichiro Tenryu	2	1,532 - 1,559
3	Seiji Sakaguchi	2	357
4	Stan Hansen	1	265
5	Antonio Inoki	1	262
6	Ted DiBiase	1	106
7	Abdullah the Butcher	1	101
8	Ray Mendoza	1	87 - 112
9	Harley Race	1	84
10	Akihisa Takachiho	1	37
11	Johnny Valentine	1	33
12	Pantera Negra	1	28
13	Billy Robinson	1	18
14	John Tolos	2	14 - 39
15	King Krow	1	11 - 41
16	Dick Murdoch	1	11
17	David Von Erich	1	7
18	Michael Hayes	1	6
19	The Sheik	1	1
20	Dale Lewis	1	0 - 22

== See also ==
- List of National Wrestling Alliance championships
- Triple Crown Heavyweight Championship
- NWA International Heavyweight Championship
- PWF Heavyweight Championship
- United National Tag Team Championship
- Marigold United National Championship
