= HammerLock Wrestling =

1994 video game

- North American cover art
- Developer(s): Jaleco
- Publisher(s): Jaleco
- Platform(s): Super NES
- Release: JP: September 30, 1994; NA: October 1994
- Genre(s): Fighting/wrestling
- Mode(s): Single-player, multiplayer

HammerLock Wrestling is a professional wrestling game for the Super NES that was released in 1994. In Japan, this game was called Tenryu Genichiro no Pro Wrestling Revolution (天龍源一郎のプロレスレボリューション).

The game features simultaneous views of the crowd, the ring and a close-up of the action.

== Reception ==
GamePro described HammerLock Wrestling as "an interesting but confusing SNES game". They commented that the division of the screen into three horizontal windows, while aesthetically appealing, makes it hard to stay focused on the action, as well as severely limiting the movements of the wrestlers.
