= Genichiro Tenryu =

Japanese professional wrestler (born 1950)

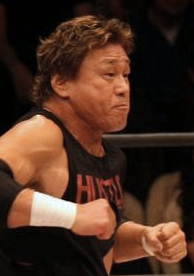
- Tenryu in 2008

Personal information
- Born: Genichiro Shimada (嶋田 源一郎, Shimada Gen'ichirō); February 2, 1950 (age 76) Katsuyama, Fukui, Japan

Professional wrestling career
- Ring name(s): Genichiro Tenryu; Tenryu; Hayabusa; Big Hayabusa; Hustle General
- Billed height: 1.88 m (6 ft 2 in)
- Billed weight: 124 kg (273 lb)
- Trained by: Dory Funk Jr. Terry Funk; Giant Baba
- Debut: November 13, 1976
- Retired: November 15, 2015

Genichiro Shimada (嶋田 源一郎, Shimada Gen'ichirō; born February 2, 1950), better known as Genichiro Tenryu (天龍 源一郎, Tenryū Gen'ichirō) is a Japanese retired professional wrestler and professional wrestling promoter. At age 13, he entered sumo wrestling and stayed there for 13 years, after which he turned to Western-style professional wrestling. "Tenryu" was his shikona. He had two stints with All Japan Pro Wrestling (AJPW), where he spent the majority of his career while also promoting Super World of Sports (SWS), Wrestle Association R (WAR) and Tenryu Project. He is widely considered to be one of the greatest professional wrestlers of all time. At the time of his retirement, professional wrestling journalist and historian Dave Meltzer wrote that "one could make a strong case [that Tenryu was] between the fourth and sixth biggest native star" in the history of Japanese professional wrestling.

== Sumo wrestling career ==
Tenryū Genichiro
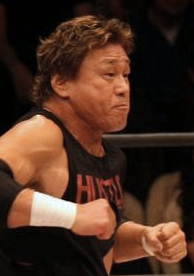

Personal information
- Native name: 天龍 源一郎
- Height: 1.85 m (6 ft 1 in)
- Weight: 112 kg (247 lb)

Sport
- Sport: Sumo
- Retired: September, 1976
- Heya: Nishonoseki
- Record: 393-355-0
- Debut: January, 1964
- Highest rank: Maegashira 1 (January, 1974)
- Championships: 1 (Jūryō); 1 (Makushita)
- Updated on Sep. 2012

As a sumo wrestler, Tenryu was ranked as a sekitori for 27 tournaments, 16 of them in the top makuuchi division. His highest rank was maegashira 1. Upon the death of his stablemaster at Nishonoseki stable he wanted to join former stablemate Daikirin's newly established Oshiogawa stable, which had just broken off from Nishonoseki, but the Japan Sumo Association insisted he stay at Nishonoseki whose new stablemaster, Kongō, he did not get along with. He finished one more tournament, and even though his career still showed promise, he decided to leave the sumo world at the young age of 26 in September 1976.

== Professional wrestling career ==
=== All Japan Pro Wrestling (1976–1990) ===
Scouted by Giant Baba, the All Japan Pro Wrestling (AJPW) owner, Tenryu was sent to Amarillo, Texas to be trained by Dory Funk Jr. and Terry Funk, and debuted in Texas in 1976, against Ted DiBiase. After returning to Japan in 1977, he stayed in the undercard until about 1982 when he began to get a slight push in that year's Champion Carnival tournament. In 1983, following a brief stint in Jim Crockett Promotions, his push began in earnest when Jumbo Tsuruta pursued the NWA International heavyweight title, now the main title in the Triple Crown Heavyweight Championship.

1984 saw Tenryu winning the NWA United National title, now also part of the Triple Crown, as well as the NWA International tag team title with Tsuruta. Their combination was called "Kakuryu" (鶴 = kaku = tsuru (the "tsuru" in Tsuruta) + 龍 = ryū in Tenryū). The team feuded with Riki Choshu and Yoshiaki Yatsu, who were the leaders in an "invasion" angle by the Japan Pro Wrestling promotion, an All Japan satellite made up of former New Japan Pro-Wrestling talent.

In 1987, following the departure of the Japan Pro talent, Kakuryu broke up after losing the tag team titles to The Road Warriors, which led to Tenryu forming his own stable, "Revolution", with former International Pro Wrestling wrestlers Ashura Hara and Hiromichi Fuyuki, as well as All Japan rookies Toshiaki Kawada, and Yoshinari Ogawa; Tatsumi Kitahara would join the group upon his debut in 1988. Tenryu and Hara feuded with Tsuruta and his new partner Yatsu over the Pacific Wrestling Federation World tag team titles and later with their replacement, the World Tag Team Championship (a combination of the PWF World and NWA International tag belts). Hara was kicked out of the promotion in late 1988, and Tenryu replaced him with Stan Hansen, with whom he held the World Tag Team Championship as well.

1989 was Tenryu's banner year. Tsuruta became the first Triple Crown champion on April 18 of that year, and just two days later Tenryu became his first challenger. The Tsuruta-Tenryu series that ensued set the standard for all Triple Crown matches and feuds to follow. When Tenryu won the belts on June 5, the match was so spectacular it was deemed Match of the Year by major Japanese publications. The same year saw him finally pin his mentor Baba, albeit in a tag match - but still a major success for a Japanese wrestler. Only Mitsuharu Misawa would duplicate this feat. In addition, Tenryu was chosen to be one-third of the NWA World Six-Man Tag Team Champions with the Road Warriors after the Road Warriors turned heel against their former co-holder of the title, Dusty Rhodes. However, the relationship between All Japan Pro Wrestling and the NWA was significantly strained when Tenryu and the Road Warriors were scheduled to compete in a match Baba had advertised to his Japanese audience, but American booking decisions prevented the match from taking place. This created an uncomfortable situation where Giant Baba had to apologize to his Japanese audience for a match he had promoted not taking place, and was a key factor in All Japan Pro Wrestling's ultimate withdrawal from the NWA. This also resulted in the six man championship being vacated and abandoned until 1991, when it was temporarily resurrected as a World Championship Wrestling championship.

=== Super World of Sports (1990–1992) ===
In April 1990, Tenryu left All Japan Pro Wrestling to form Super World of Sports (SWS). He wrestled his first match for the nascent promotion in September 1990, teaming with Takashi Ishikawa as "Revolution" to defeat Dojo Geki (Isao Takagi and Yoshiaki Yatsu).

In 1991, as part of a working agreement between Super World of Sports and the World Wrestling Federation, Tenryu appeared at WrestleMania VII, where he teamed with Koji Kitao to defeat Demolition.

Tenryu wrestled his final match for SWS in June 1992, teaming with Ashura Hara and Último Dragón to defeat Jerry Estrada, King Haku, and The Great Kabuki.

=== Wrestling and Romance (1992–1999) ===
After Super World of Sports collapsed in June 1992, Tenryu, aided by Masatomo Takei (brother of his wife Makiyo) formed Wrestling and Romance (WAR). WAR became his base from where he would take on top wrestlers from other promotions, such as Atsushi Onita, Nobuhiko Takada, The Great Muta, Shinya Hashimoto and Masahiro Chono, all of whom he defeated. He also traded victories with Tatsumi Fujinami and Antonio Inoki, thus becoming the only Japanese wrestler to defeat both Inoki and Baba by pinfall.

Tenryu made brief returns to the World Wrestling Federation at the 1993 Royal Rumble and 1994 Royal Rumble; in the latter he made it to the final five but was eliminated by eventual co-winners Lex Luger and Bret Hart. An angle had he and The Great Kabuki hired as mercenaries by WWF Champion Yokozuna's manager, Mr. Fuji, to attack Luger and prevent him from winning.

In 1998, as WAR went into decline, Tenryu began an earnest comeback, this time in New Japan. He first joined Heisei Ishingun, allied with its leader Shiro Koshinaka, and they won the IWGP Tag Team Championship from Team Wolf, Masahiro Chono and Hiroyoshi Tenzan. In December 1999, Tenryu made history as the first native to win the top two distinctions of professional wrestling in Japan (All Japan's Triple Crown and New Japan's IWGP Heavyweight title) by beating Mutoh for the IWGP title. (The first man to win both titles was Big Van Vader, an American.)

=== All Japan Pro Wrestling (2000–2004) ===
In 2000, following the near-collapse of All Japan due to the Pro Wrestling Noah split, Tenryu closed WAR and rejoined All Japan, eager to test his mettle against the remaining ace, his former disciple Kawada. Tenryu beat Kawada in the subsequent tournament for the vacant Triple Crown, winning the belts for a second time. In his second stay in All Japan, he would capture the belts a third time and also the World Tag Team Championship with former WAR–UWFI feud rival Yoji Anjo.

=== Late career and retirement (2004–2015) ===
In 2003, he joined Fighting World of Japan Pro Wrestling for a few matches, but as it declined rapidly, he switched back and forth aimlessly between New Japan and All Japan.

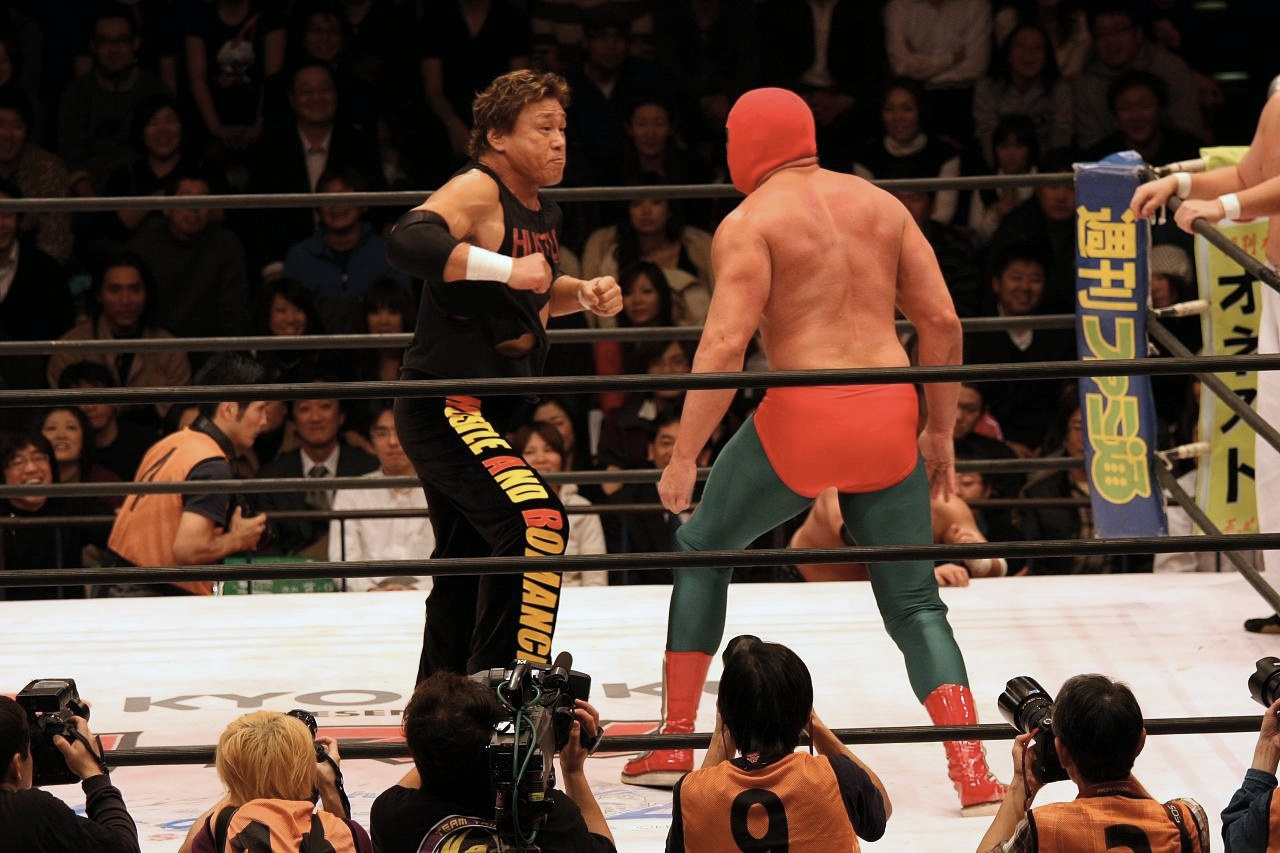
Genichiro Tenryu in 2008

In 2005, he entered Noah, and began feuds with Misawa, Kenta Kobashi, and other wrestlers he knew from his first All Japan stint, as well as new faces he's never met in the ring before, such as Jun Akiyama. Tenryu has also been with the Hustle promotion and was a part of the main heel group led by Generalissimo Takada. During this time, he teamed with Toshiaki Kawada mainly. At Hustle Aid 2007, however, Tenryu was defeated by Razor Ramon HG and joined the main face group led by Razor Ramon HG, Hustle Army.

In December 2009, following the folding of Hustle, Tenryu began running his own Tenryu Project promotion. He continued to make forays into other promotions, remaining active even past age 60.

On February 7, 2015, it was reported that Tenryu had decided to retire from professional wrestling with his final match scheduled to take place later in the year. Tenryu held a press conference two days later to confirm the report, announcing that his retirement event would be taking place in November and would feature participation from All Japan, New Japan and Noah. On August 16, Tenryu made a surprise return to New Japan, having a confrontation with Kazuchika Okada to set up his retirement match on November 15. In the meantime, he embarked on a multipromotional "Retirement Road" tour, including matches in Kyushu Pro-Wrestling, DDT, BJW, Wrestle-1 and Pro Wrestling Freedoms. On November 15, Tenryu was defeated by Okada in his retirement match. Tokyo Sports named Tenryu's retirement match the 2015 Match of the Year.

== Other media ==
Tenryu appears as a gang member in the 2017 video game Yakuza Kiwami 2, alongside Keiji Mutoh, Masahiro Chono, Riki Choshu and Tatsumi Fujinami. Tenryu is also a regular guest on the annual 24-hour comedy special, Gaki no Tsukai - No Laughing Challenge, often appearing as a character who occasionally (and intentionally) speaks unintelligibly to cause the contestants to laugh.

== Championships and accomplishments ==
- All Japan Pro Wrestling
  - All Asia Tag Team Championship (1 time) – with Masanobu Fuchi
  - NWA International Tag Team Championship (2 times) – with Jumbo Tsuruta
  - NWA United National Championship (2 times)
  - PWF World Heavyweight Championship (1 time)
  - PWF World Tag Team Championship (1 time) – with Ashura Hara
  - Triple Crown Heavyweight Championship (3 times)
  - World Tag Team Championship (5 times) – with Stan Hansen (3), Ashura Hara (1), and Yoji Anjo (1)
  - Champion Carnival (2001)
  - World's Strongest Tag Determination League (1984) – with Jumbo Tsuruta
  - World's Strongest Tag Determination League (1986) – with Jumbo Tsuruta
  - World's Strongest Tag Determination League (1989) – with Stan Hansen
  - January 2 Korakuen Hall Heavyweight Battle Royal (1982)
  - United National Title League (1986)
  - Triple Crown Heavyweight Championship Tournament (2000)
  - Champion's Carnival Technique Award (1982)
  - World's Strongest Tag Determination League New Wave Award (1981) – with Ashura Hara
  - World's Strongest Tag Determination League Fighting Spirit Award (1982) – with Ashura Hara
  - World's Strongest Tag Determination League Technique Award (1983) – with Jumbo Tsuruta
  - World's Strongest Tag Determination League Outstanding Performance Award (1985) – with Jumbo Tsuruta
  - World's Strongest Tag Determination League Outstanding Performance Award (1987) – with Ashura Hara
  - World's Strongest Tag Determination League Outstanding Fighting Spirit Award (1987) – with Ashura Hara
  - World's Strongest Tag Determination League Fighting Spirit Award (1988) – with Toshiaki Kawada
  - World's Strongest Tag Determination League Best Player Award (1989)
- Fighting World of Japan Pro Wrestling
  - WMG Tag Team Championship (1 time) – with Riki Choshu
- Hustle
  - Hustle Super Tag Team Championship (1 time, inaugural) – with Tadao Yasuda
- International Professional Wrestling Hall of Fame
  - Class of 2022
- Mid-Atlantic Championship Wrestling/World Championship Wrestling
  - NWA Mid-Atlantic Tag Team Championship (1 time) – with Mr. Fuji
  - NWA World Six-Man Tag Team Championship (1 time) – with The Road Warriors
- New Japan Pro-Wrestling
  - IWGP Heavyweight Championship (1 time)
  - IWGP Tag Team Championship (1 time) – with Shiro Koshinaka
- Nikkan Sports
  - Match of the Year (1999) vs. Keiji Mutoh on May 3
- Pro Wrestling Illustrated
  - Ranked No. 44 of the 500 best singles wrestlers during the "PWI Years" in 2003
  - Ranked No. 14 and 30 of the 100 best tag teams of the "PWI Years" with Jumbo Tsuruta and Ashura Hara, respectively, in 2003
- Super World of Sports
  - SWS vs WWF Tournament (1990)
  - One Night Tag Team Tournament (1990) – with Koji Kitao
- Tenryu Project
  - Tenryu Project World 6-Man Tag Team Championship (1 time) – with Arashi and Tomohiro Ishii
  - Hidden Genius R League (2013) - with Ryuichi Kawakami
- Tokyo Sports
  - Best Tag Team Award (1983, 1985) with Jumbo Tsuruta
  - Best Tag Team Award (1987) with Ashura Hara
  - Fighting Spirit Award (1983)
  - Lifetime Achievement Award (2015)
  - Match of the Year Award (1987) vs. Jumbo Tsuruta on August 31
  - Match of the Year Award (1988) vs. Stan Hansen on July 27
  - Match of the Year Award (1989) vs. Jumbo Tsuruta on June 5
  - Match of the Year Award (1991) vs. Hulk Hogan on December 12
  - Match of the Year Award (1993) vs. Riki Choshu on January 4
  - Match of the Year Award (1994) with Ashura Hara vs. Atsushi Onita and Tarzan Goto on March 2
  - Match of the Year Award (1996) vs. Nobuhiko Takada on September 11
  - Match of the Year Award (1999) vs. Keiji Mutoh on May 3
  - Match of the Year Award (2015) vs. Kazuchika Okada on November 15
  - MVP Award (1986, 1987, 1988, 1993)
  - Outstanding Performance Award (1981, 1984, 1996)
  - Technique Award (1990)
- Wrestle Association "R"
  - J-1 Heavyweight Championship (1 time, final)
  - WAR World Six-Man Tag Team Championship (2 times) – with Koki Kitahara and Animal Hamaguchi (1), and Nobutaka Araya and Último Dragón (1)
  - Six Man Tag Team Tournament (1994) - with Atsushi Onita and Crusher Bam Bam Bigelow
  - One Night Tag Team Tournament (1995) - with Último Dragón
  - J-1 Heavyweight Championship Tournament (1998)
- Wrestling Observer Newsletter
  - Match of the Year (2001) vs. Keiji Mutoh on June 8, Tokyo, Japan
  - Wrestling Observer Newsletter Hall of Fame (Class of 1996)

== Sumo career record ==
Tenryū Genichiro
Year	January Hatsu basho, Tokyo	March Haru basho, Osaka	May Natsu basho, Tokyo	July Nagoya basho, Nagoya	September Aki basho, Tokyo	November Kyūshū basho, Fukuoka
1964	(Maezumo)	West Jonokuchi #22; 5–2	West Jonidan #96; 4–3	East Jonidan #67; 3–4	West Jonidan #87; 5–2	East Jonidan #38; 4–3
1965	East Jonidan #13; 5–2	East Sandanme #64; 3–4	West Sandanme #77; 5–2	West Sandanme #33; 4–3	East Sandanme #22; 2–5	West Sandanme #47; 3–4
1966	West Sandanme #58; 3–4	West Sandanme #63; 4–3	West Sandanme #51; 5–2	East Sandanme #14; 4–3	East Makushita #95; 4–3	West Makushita #75; 6–1
1967	West Makushita #43; 3–4	West Makushita #46; 3–4	West Makushita #58; 2–5	East Sandanme #12; 3–4	West Sandanme #20; 1–6	West Sandanme #50; 5–2
1968	East Sandanme #22; 4–3	West Sandanme #11; 3–4	West Sandanme #26; 5–2	East Sandanme #5; 5–2	East Makushita #43; 4–3	East Makushita #36; 3–4
1969	East Makushita #39; 5–2	West Makushita #24; 3–4	East Makushita #29; 5–2	West Makushita #18; 3–4	East Makushita #24; 4–3	West Makushita #20; 3–4
1970	West Makushita #24; 6–1	East Makushita #7; 3–4	West Makushita #9; 3–4	East Makushita #14; 3–4	West Makushita #19; 6–1–P; Champion	East Makushita #4; 3–4
1971	West Makushita #7; 3–4	West Makushita #12; 4–3	West Makushita #10; 5–2	West Makushita #3; 6–1	West Jūryō #11; 6–9	East Makushita #2; 3–4
1972	West Makushita #4; 4–3	West Makushita #3; 3–4	East Makushita #7; 6–1–P	East Jūryō #13; 8–7	West Jūryō #8; 10–5–P	East Jūryō #3; 10–5
1973	East Maegashira #13; 8–7	East Maegashira #10; 9–6	West Maegashira #5; 6–9	West Maegashira #9; 6–9	East Maegashira #13; 9–6	East Maegashira #7; 9–6
1974	West Maegashira #1; 5–10	West Maegashira #5; 6–9	West Maegashira #9; 6–9	East Maegashira #11; 8–7	West Maegashira #8; 8–7	East Maegashira #7; 5–10
1975	East Maegashira #12; 5–10	West Jūryō #3; 8–7	East Jūryō #2; 4–11	West Jūryō #10; 13–2; Champion	West Maegashira #13; 6–9	West Jūryō #2; 8–7
1976	East Maegashira #14; 4–11	West Jūryō #4; 10–5	East Jūryō #1; 7–8	West Jūryō #2; 10–5	East Maegashira #13; Retired; 8–7	x
Record given as wins–losses–absences Top division champion Top division runner-up Retired Lower divisions Non-participation Sanshō key: F=Fighting spirit; O=Outstanding performance; T=Technique Also shown: ★=Kinboshi; P=Playoff(s); Divisions: Makuuchi — Jūryō — Makushita — Sandanme — Jonidan — Jonokuchi Makuuchi ranks: Yokozuna — Ōzeki — Sekiwake — Komusubi — Maegashira

== Video games ==
- Tenryū Gen'ichirō no Puroresu Revolution
- HammerLock Wrestling
- Fire Pro Wrestling: Combination Tag
- Fire Pro Wrestling 2nd Bout
- Fire Pro Wrestling 3 Legend Bout
- Super Fire Pro Wrestling
- Super Fire Pro Wrestling 2
- Super Fire Pro Wrestling III: Final Bout
- Super Fire Pro Wrestling III: Easy Type
- Super Fire Pro Wrestling Special
- Super Fire Pro Wrestling X
- Super Fire Pro Wrestling X Premium
- Gekitou Burning Pro Wrestling
- Fire Pro Wrestling Returns
- Super Star Pro Wrestling
- Virtual Pro Wrestling 64
- Virtual Pro Wrestling 2: Ōdō Keishō
- King of Colosseum: Red
- King of Colosseum II
- Wrestle Kingdom
- Wrestle Kingdom 2

== See also ==
- List of past sumo wrestlers
- List of sumo tournament second division champions

Achievements
Preceded by Keiji Mutoh	25th IWGP Heavyweight Champion; December 10, 1999 – January 4, 2000	Succeeded by Kensuke Sasaki
