= All Japan Pro Wrestling TV =

- Broadcast area: Worldwide
- Headquarters: Yokohama, Kanagawa, Japan

Programming
- Languages: Japanese; English; Chinese; Korean; Spanish
- Picture format: 720p HD

Ownership
- Owner: All Japan Pro Wrestling

History
- Launched: March 19, 2018

Links
- Website: http://www.ajpw.tv/

All Japan Pro Wrestling TV (AJPW TV) is a subscription-based video streaming service owned by All Japan Pro Wrestling. On February 4, 2018, AJPW announced "All Japan Pro Wrestling TV", a new worldwide streaming site for the promotion's events. All major AJPW events air live on the service, which also features matches from the promotion's archives, dating back to 2017. The service was launched on March 19, 2018 but does not include footage from the 1990s and before, due to Nippon TV owning the rights. The service has a current monthly subscription price of ¥900.

== See also ==
- Club WWN
- Wrestle Universe
