= Stan Hansen =

American professional wrestler (born 1949)

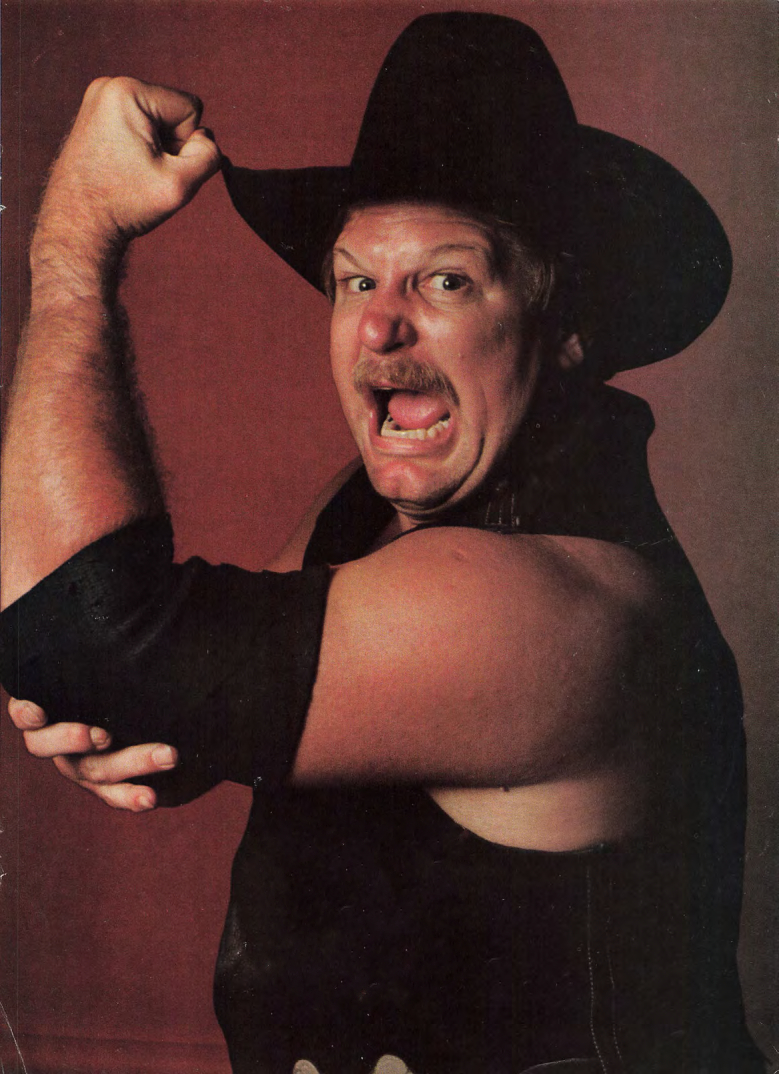
- Hansen, c. 1985

Personal information
- Born: John Stanley Hansen II; August 29, 1949 (age 76) Knox City, Texas, U.S.
- Education: West Texas State University
- Spouse: Yumi Hansen
- Children: 4

Professional wrestling career
- Ring name: Stan "The Lariat" Hansen
- Billed height: 6 ft 4 in (1.93 m)
- Billed weight: 321 lb (146 kg; 22.9 st)
- Billed from: Borger, Texas
- Trained by: Dory Funk; Dory Funk Jr. Terry Funk
- Debut: January 1, 1973
- Retired: January 28, 2001

John Stanley Hansen II (born August 29, 1949), best known as Stan "the Lariat" Hansen, is an American retired professional wrestler.

Hansen is known for his stiff wrestling style, which he attributed to his poor eyesight, and for his gimmick as a loud, violent cowboy who wanted to fight everybody, which he further emphasized by appearing in interviews with a cowboy hat, leather vest and bullrope while often chewing on tobacco. Hansen became established as a massively successful and popular gaijin in Japanese professional wrestling where he eventually became more well-known and revered than he was in his native United States. In Japan's AJPW promotion, he held seven different championships. Overall he is a ten-time world champion.

Outside of wrestling Hansen played a small role in the movie No Holds Barred in 1989 and in 2011 he released his co-written biography, The Last Outlaw.

== Football career ==
Hansen played college football for the West Texas State Buffaloes.

== Professional wrestling career ==
=== Early career (1973–1980) ===
Hansen made his professional wrestling debut in 1973, grappling part-time while trying to make it as an American football player. The following year, he tried out for the Detroit Wheels the short-lived World Football League, but did not make the team, and so began wrestling full-time. In 1975, Hansen first teamed with future partner Frank Goodish, who later adopted the ring name Bruiser Brody, while competing in Leroy McGuirk's Tri-State territory.

=== All Japan Pro Wrestling (1975) ===
Hansen made his first tour to Japan working for All Japan Pro Wrestling in September and October 1975. He feuded with Dutch wrestler Anton Geesink and the Great Kojika.

=== World Wide/World Wrestling Federation (1976-1977, 1980–1981) ===
In 1976, Hansen made his debut for the World Wide Wrestling Federation (WWWF) and only two months after he began competing for the company, he began feuding with the WWF Heavyweight Champion Bruno Sammartino over the title. During a title match, Hansen broke Sammartino's neck while they were wrestling and it was from this incident that both Hansen and promoters claimed that Sammartino's injury came about from the enormous power of his lariat. However, a botched powerslam is what actually caused Sammartino's injury. After Sammartino recovered, Hansen faced him for the WWWF Heavyweight Championship once again, at Showdown at Shea, but was unsuccessful. He left the promotion in 1977.

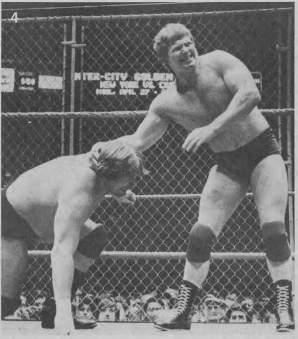
Hansen (left) wrestling Bob Backlund in a steel cage match, 1981

He returned in 1980, rekindling his feud with Sammartino and facing Pedro Morales and Andre the Giant on several occasions. He also developed a heated feud with the then-WWF Champion Bob Backlund which culminated in a steel cage match at Madison Square Garden.

=== New Japan Pro-Wrestling (1977–1981, 1990) ===
Hansen first came to New Japan Pro-Wrestling (NJPW) in January 1977 through the booking of Vince McMahon Sr. With his "reputation" as the man who broke Bruno Sammartino's neck, Hansen quickly became a top heel, facing Antonio Inoki and other top New Japan stars like Seiji Sakaguchi and Tatsumi Fujinami. In addition, while touring Japan regularly, he faced top American wrestlers including Andre the Giant, Dusty Rhodes, Bob Backlund, and Hulk Hogan. Hansen established himself as a dominant force in Japan by competing in New Japan's MSG (Madison Square Garden) tournament between 1978 and 1981. Hansen would win the NWF World Title from Antonio Inoki on February 8, 1980, one of the only two wrestlers to dethrone Inoki during his seven-year reign. From November 21 to December 13, 1980, Hansen did a tour for NJPW, where he competed in the first MSG Tag League tournament (later renamed the G1 Tag League). He teamed with Hulk Hogan, but they failed to win. He returned that April to wrestle Antonio Inoki in an unsuccessful match. However, he defeated Inoki via countout in a MSG League match on May 20, 1981, after hitting a lariat on Inoki, knocking him off the apron. He returned for several more one-off shows until leaving the promotion in December 1981.

Hansen returned at NJPW's Super Fight In Tokyo Dome event in 1990, where he had an infamous inter-promotional match against Vader. The match for the IWGP Heavyweight Championship saw Big Van Vader (representing New Japan, while Hansen represented All Japan) get struck in the nose during the entrances by Hansen's Bullrope, breaking it. Both men were known to use a stiff style of wrestling, resulting in a nasty exchange where each man threw legitimate punches, during which Hansen unintentionally poked Vader's left eye with his thumb during their brawl, causing the eye to pop out of its socket. After removing his mask, Vader pushed the eye back into its socket and held it in place with his eyelid. The match ended in a draw. Hansen returned in June for a few more matches, teaming twice with Riki Choshu and once with The Pegasus Kid.

=== All Japan Pro Wrestling (1981–1990) ===
In 1981, Hansen abruptly left NJPW to join All Japan Pro Wrestling (AJPW). While in AJPW, Hansen became the only man to pin Antonio Inoki and Giant Baba in championship singles matches. He continued wrestling from 1982 to 1999 in World's Strongest Tag Determination League. He wrestled primarily in tag matches, where he formed many teams with the likes of Bruiser Brody, Terry Gordy, Ted DiBiase, Genichiro Tenryu, Dan Spivey, Bobby Duncum Jr., and Big Van Vader. Hansen also engaged in a renowned brawl with André the Giant in Japan.

On April 13, 1990, the World Wrestling Federation and AJPW held a supershow called Wrestling Summit at the Tokyo Dome in Tokyo, in which Hansen lost to Hulk Hogan in the main event. Hansen won his first Triple Crown Heavyweight Championship by defeating Terry Gordy on June 8, 1990, and wrestled a rematch in NJPW against Vader on June 12.

=== American Wrestling Association (1985–1986) ===
Hansen competed in the American Wrestling Association (AWA) from 1985 to 1986. He won the World Heavyweight Championship on December 29, 1985, from Rick Martel. On June 29, 1986, he no-showed a title defense against the number one contender Nick Bockwinkel due to disagreements with management, forcing the AWA to default the title to Bockwinkel. Rumors suggest that Hansen was actually in the building that evening and had been informed by AWA promoter Verne Gagne of the pending loss to Bockwinkel. Hansen allegedly called All Japan Pro Wrestling president Giant Baba to ask if losing the championship was acceptable, but Baba had already lined up challengers for Hansen and did not permit Hansen to drop the championship. In the end, Hansen refused to drop the title to Bockwinkel and was stripped of the championship; Bockwinkel was given one of the tag team belts, which was then billed as the AWA World Heavyweight Championship due to Hansen still possessing the true title belt. Hansen immediately returned to Japan and defended the AWA World Heavyweight Championship, despite being stripped of it. The AWA threatened legal action if Hansen continued to carry the belt and refer to himself as the organization's champion, so Hansen responded by running over the belt with his truck and mailing it back with the mud tracks still on it. This chain of events was reviewed in an interview with Hansen at an NWA Legends convention, in which he expressed regret over the way he handled the situation and ultimately complimented Gagne.

=== World Championship Wrestling (1990–1991) ===
In late 1990, Hansen began appearing in World Championship Wrestling (WCW), feuding with Lex Luger over the NWA United States Heavyweight Championship. On October 27 at Halloween Havoc, Hansen defeated Luger to win the title, ending Luger's record-setting reign at 523 days. On December 16 at Starrcade, Hansen lost the title back to Luger in a bullrope match. During this period, Hansen continued working tours for All Japan, teaming with Dan Spivey to finish second in the World's Strongest Tag Determination League in November and December. Hansen wrestled another rematch with Vader at the WrestleWar '91 pay-per-view in February 1991. On April 18, Hansen and Spivey won the AJPW World Tag Team Championship from Terry Gordy and Steve Williams, and teamed occasionally upon their return to WCW. In June, Hansen left WCW and returned full-time to All Japan after a disagreement over an idea to group him with The Desperados, a trio of bumbling cowboys looking for Hansen through a series of vignettes. His last WCW match occurred on June 23 in Atlanta. As a result of his departure, The Desperados' angle was dropped and the trio was quickly dissolved.

=== Eastern Championship Wrestling (1993) ===
In August 1993 Hansen made his Eastern Championship Wrestling (ECW) debut in Philadelphia. His first match he defeated ECW TV Champion Jimmy Snuka by disqualification. Hansen's last ECW appearance was at ECW UltraClash 1993 where he teamed with Terry Funk defeating Abdullah the Butcher and Kevin Sullivan by disqualification.

=== Return to AJPW (1991–2001) ===
Upon his return to AJPW, Hansen began a major feud with Mitsuharu Misawa, during which time they traded the Triple Crown Championship between one another. Following Giant Baba's death, Misawa became the new booker and quickly began de-emphasizing Hansen and other foreign talent, in favor of new native recruits such as Takao Omori and Yoshihiro Takayama.

In 2000, Misawa and all but two natives defected from the promotion and formed Pro Wrestling Noah (NOAH), although Hansen chose to remain loyal to AJPW instead of joining the talent exodus. Despite remaining with AJPW, Hansen's ongoing lumbago at the time began to worsen, which ultimately lead him to wrestle his final singles match on October 21, 2000, as part of a tournament for the vacant Triple Crown Heavyweight Championship. Hansen lost the semi-final match to old partner Genichiro Tenryu, who went on to win the tournament and the title. His last match altogether was a six-man bout on the 28th, in which he, Steve Williams and Wolf Hawkfield lost to Johnny Smith, Yoshiaki Fujiwara and Masanobu Fuchi.

Hansen announced his retirement on January 28, 2001, during the Giant Baba Memorial Spectacular event.

=== Post-retirement ===
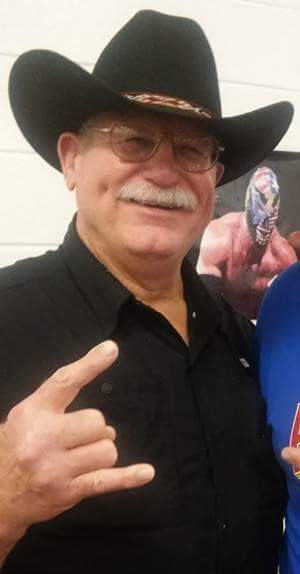
Hansen in 2015

Soon after retiring, Hansen successfully underwent surgery on his back and knees, the latter of which were both replaced. After recovering, he became the commissioner of AJPW's Pacific Wrestling Federation championship governing body, which saw him appear during Triple Crown and World Tag Team Championship matches to issue proclamations of the matches. In July 2007, Hansen voluntarily resigned from the position, with Hiroshi Hase replacing him.

On April 2, 2016, Hansen was inducted into the WWE Hall of Fame by his rival and friend Vader.

== Personal life ==
In 1989, Hansen had a small role in the World Wrestling Federation-produced movie No Holds Barred, which starred Hulk Hogan.

Although he famously stated during his wrestling career that he has "9 kids", Hansen has four children. He has an elder son John III, and daughter Elizabeth Hardee, from his first marriage. He had two more children with his current wife Yumi: Shaver (born December 19, 1987), who played baseball at Baylor University before being drafted by the Seattle Mariners as the second pick in the sixth round of the 2009 MLB draft, and Samuel (born February 21, 1991), who also played baseball for the University of Texas at Arlington.

== Other media ==
=== Filmography ===
- No Holds Barred (1989) as "Neanderthal"
- The Unbreakable Bunch (2025) as Hammer
- Rimmington Steel (2026) as Witness

=== Books ===
- The Last Outlaw (August 8, 2011)

== Championships and accomplishments ==
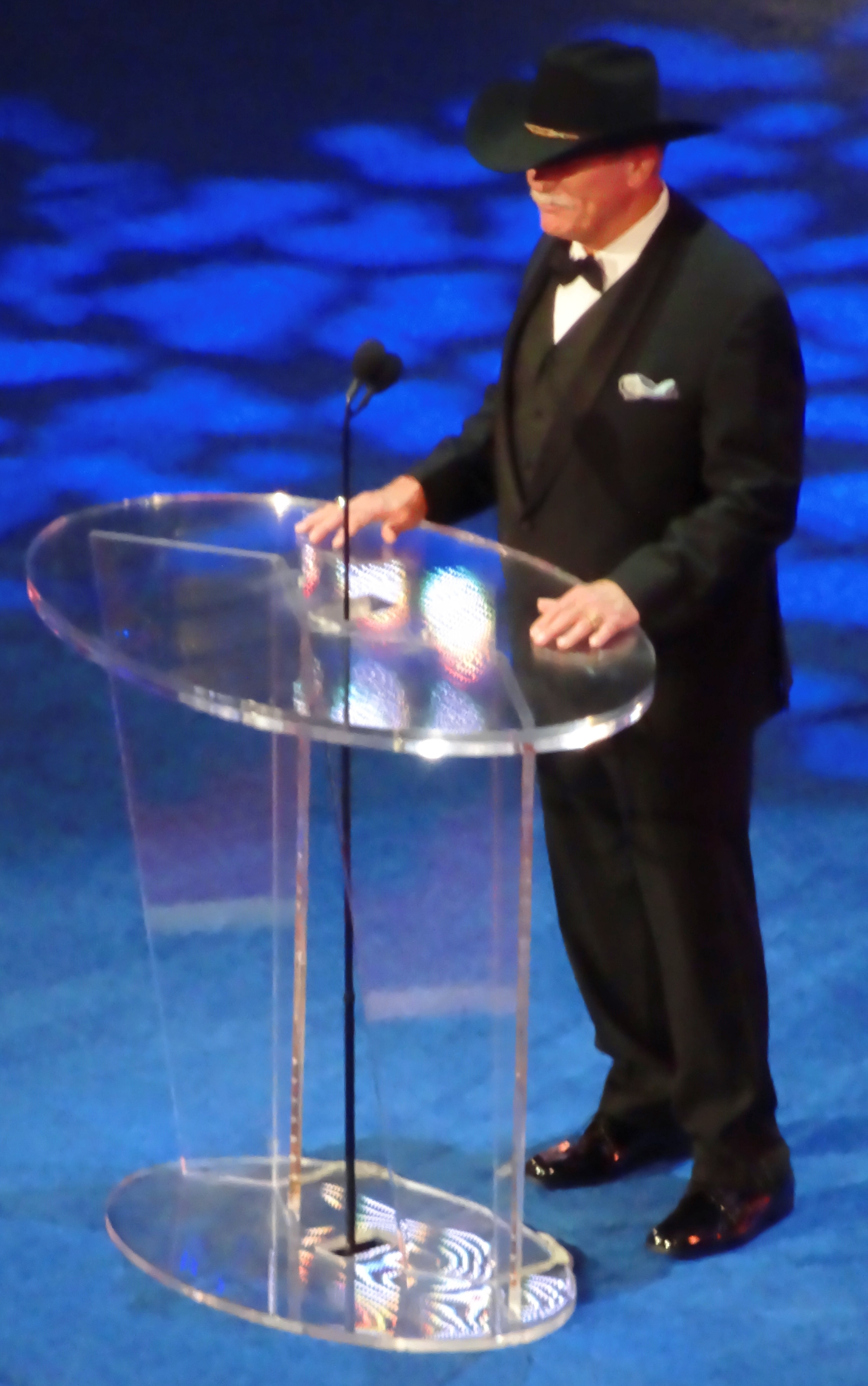
Hansen in the WWE Hall of Fame

- All Japan Pro Wrestling
  - NWA International Heavyweight Championship (1 time)
  - NWA International Tag Team Championship (1 time) – with Ron Bass
  - NWA United National Championship (1 time)
  - PWF World Heavyweight Championship (4 times)
  - PWF World Tag Team Championship (4 times) – with Bruiser Brody (1), Ted DiBiase (2) and Austin Idol (1)
  - Triple Crown Heavyweight Championship (4 times)
  - World Tag Team Championship (8 times) – with Terry Gordy (2), Genichiro Tenryu (3), Dan Spivey (1), Ted DiBiase (1) and Gary Albright (1)
  - Champion Carnival (1992, 1993)
  - World's Strongest Tag Determination League (1983) – with Bruiser Brody
  - World's Strongest Tag Determination League (1985) – with Ted DiBiase
  - World's Strongest Tag Determination League (1988) – with Terry Gordy
  - World's Strongest Tag Determination League (1989) – with Genichiro Tenryu
  - January 2 Korakuen Hall Heavyweight Battle Royal (1994)
  - World's Strongest Tag Determined League Exciting Award (1982) – with Bruiser Brody
  - World's Strongest Tag Determination League Distinguished Award (1990, 1991) - with Dan Spivey
- American Wrestling Association
  - AWA World Heavyweight Championship (1 time)
- Cauliflower Alley Club
  - Other honoree (1996)
- Continental Wrestling Association
  - CWA International Heavyweight Championship (1 time)
- George Tragos/Lou Thesz Professional Wrestling Hall of Fame
  - Frank Gotch Award (2017)
- Georgia Championship Wrestling
  - NWA Columbus Heavyweight Championship (1 time)
  - NWA Georgia Heavyweight Championship (2 times)
  - NWA Georgia Tag Team Championship (3 times) – with Tommy Rich (2) and Ole Anderson (1)
- Mid-Atlantic Championship Wrestling/World Championship Wrestling
  - NWA United States Heavyweight Championship (1 time)^{1}
  - NWA World Tag Team Championship (Mid-Atlantic version) (1 time) – with Ole Anderson
- NWA Big Time Wrestling
  - NWA Texas Tag Team Championship (1 time) – with Killer Tim Brooks
  - NWA Texas Heavyweight Championship (1 time)
- NWA Tri-State
  - NWA North American Heavyweight Championship (Tri-State version) (1 time)
  - NWA United States Tag Team Championship (Tri-State version) (2 time) – with Frank Goodish
- National Wrestling Federation
  - NWF Heavyweight Championship (1 time)
- New Japan Pro-Wrestling
  - Greatest 18 Club inductee
- Professional Wrestling Hall of Fame and Museum
  - Class of 2010
- Pro Wrestling Illustrated
  - Match of the Year (1976) vs. Bruno Sammartino on June 25
  - Most Hated Wrestler of the Year (1976)
  - Ranked #24 of the top 500 singles wrestlers in the PWI 500 in 1991
  - Ranked #16 of the top 500 singles of the "PWI Years" in 2003
  - Ranked #7, #24, #34, and #66 of the top 100 tag teams of the "PWI Years" with Bruiser Brody, Ted DiBiase, Terry Gordy, and Ole Anderson, respectively, in 2003
- Texas Wrestling Hall of Fame
  - Class of 2014
- Tokyo Sports
  - Best Foreigner Award (1982)
  - Best Tag Team Award (1998) with Vader
  - Lifetime Achievement Award (2000)
  - Match of the Year Award (1992) vs. Toshiaki Kawada on June 5
  - Match of the Year Award (1982) vs. Giant Baba on February 4
  - Match of the Year Award (1988) vs. Genichiro Tenryu on July 27
  - Popularity Award (1980)
- Wrestling Observer Newsletter
  - Best Brawler (1985, 1990)
  - Tag Team of the Year (1982) with Ole Anderson
  - Wrestling Observer Newsletter Hall of Fame (Class of 1996)
- WWE
  - WWE Hall of Fame (Class of 2016)

^{1} Hansen won the championship after Ted Turner purchased Mid-Atlantic Championship Wrestling from Jim Crockett Jr. and renamed the promotion World Championship Wrestling. Hansen's reign was also prior to the championship being renamed the WCW United States Heavyweight Championship.

AWA status
Preceded by Mr. Saito	Oldest living world champion 76; July 14, 2018 – present	Incumbent
