= Dick Beyer =

American professional wrestler (1930–2019)

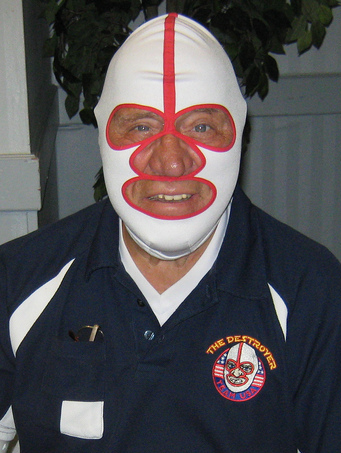
- Beyer in 2010

Personal information
- Born: Richard John Beyer; July 11, 1930 Buffalo, New York, U.S.
- Died: March 7, 2019 (aged 88) Akron, New York, U.S.
- Education: Syracuse University
- Children: 4; Including Kurt
- Family: Billy Red Lyons (brother-in-law)

Professional wrestling career
- Ring name(s): Dick Beyer; The Destroyer; Dr. X
- Billed height: 5 ft 10 in (1.78 m)
- Billed weight: 265 lb (120 kg)
- Debut: December 29, 1954
- Retired: July 29, 1993

Richard John Beyer (July 11, 1930 – March 7, 2019) was an American professional wrestler is best known by his ring names, The Destroyer and Doctor X. Among other places, he worked extensively in Japan and in 2017 he was awarded one of the country's highest honors, the Order of the Rising Sun.

== Early life ==
As an athlete at Syracuse University, Beyer was a member of the varsity football and wrestling teams. He played in the 1953 Orange Bowl for Syracuse. He graduated with a master's degree in education and was a member of the Fraternity of Phi Gamma Delta's Syracuse Chapter, as well as an Eagle Scout in the Boy Scouts of America. He was a schoolteacher and swim coach in New York until he began his wrestling career. Beyer worked the first seven years of his mat career near his Western New York home, due in large part to his coaching job and commitment to the U.S. Army Reserve. Beyer was a member of the wrestling team and also served as an assistant to Ben Schwartzwalder.

== Professional wrestling career ==
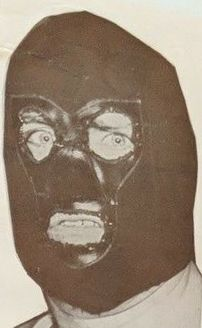
Beyer in 1969 as Dr. X

=== Worldwide Wrestling Associates (1954-1965) ===
Beyer began as a babyface wrestler in the mid-1950s, and he was voted 1955 Rookie of the Year by the Wrestling Life magazine. His career as masked wrestler The Destroyer began in 1962 in Los Angeles. Beyer traveled to California after Freddie Blassie praised Beyer's heel skills to local promoter Jules Strongbow, who informed him he would wrestle as the masked Destroyer. Beyer's original mask was hard to see through and itchy, but journeyman wrestler Ox Anderson lent him a mask fashioned from a woman's girdle, which served well for Beyer. He boasted about his East Coast academic background to help develop his heel character. He used the figure four leg lock (which became his signature finisher) on his way to the Worldwide Wrestling Associates (WWA) championship on July 27, 1962, in a win over Freddie Blassie, who convinced him that the mask gimmick would give him a large push. He defended the championship for ten months. In June 1964, he returned to Los Angeles and beat Dick the Bruiser for another WWA championship run, losing it to Bob Ellis in September, regaining it in November, and finally dropping it in March 1965 to Pedro Morales.

=== Japan Pro Wrestling Alliance (1963–1971) ===
In early 1963, Beyer wrestled three sold-out matches against Giant Baba at the Olympic Auditorium in Los Angeles. In May 1963, he traveled to Japan for the first time in his career, to wrestle Rikidōzan in a match watched by over 70 million TV viewers, being Japan's highest rated show at the time. Beyer was also the last person to hold a victory over Rikidōzan before his death. Beyer was the first masked wrestler to compete in Japan regularly, and did regular tours for the Japan Pro Wrestling Alliance until 1971. In his last tour he made it to the semifinals of the annual World League tournament before losing to a rising Antonio Inoki.

=== American Wrestling Association (1966–1972) ===
Between 1966 and 1972, Beyer wrestled as Doctor X while in Minneapolis. He had matches with many of the top names in the business including his real brother-in-law Billy Red Lyons, who handed him his first American Wrestling Association (AWA) defeat on Minneapolis television, with a figure-four leglock. In August 1970, he took a chance at revenge against his former partner Blackjack Lanza. He stood in the center of the ring with announcer Marty O'Neill, who told the fans that Doctor X was a former coach from Syracuse University. Doctor X then removed his mask, handed it to promoter Eddie Williams, and wrestled the match as Dick Beyer. In other AWA cities, Beyer was unmasked by Lanza or Paul Diamond. In these matches, his name was said to be Bruce Marshall. He wanted to lose the mask because he and his family were set to go to Japan, where he would be The Destroyer again. During 1972, he had several battles with "Crippler" Ray Stevens. Their last match saw him written out of the AWA with a purported broken leg.

=== All Japan Pro Wrestling (1972–1993) ===
From 1972 to 1979, Beyer wrestled in Japan on a deal with Giant Baba and NTV of Tokyo. He feuded with Mil Máscaras in a series of seven matches, stating on his style, "He was the best competitor that I ever wrestled. He never gave you anything – it's true – but I didn't give him anything either. You talk about a shoot or a half-shoot, and that's the kind of match that it was." He also helped promote All Japan Pro Wrestling (AJPW) for Baba and established himself as a gaijin tarento in a late-night TV show called Uwasa No Channel. His appearance on the musical-comedy show only furthered the Destroyer's popularity in Japan, which led to him recording a Christmas album for his fans. He held the PWF United States Championship until 1979, when he left AJPW and the championship was abandoned. Beyer was also the first American wrestler signed to a Japanese promotion. His retirement match took place on July 29, 1993, where, he, his son Kurt Beyer, and Giant Baba defeated Haruka Eigen, Masanobu Fuchi, and Masao Inoue.

== Later life and death ==
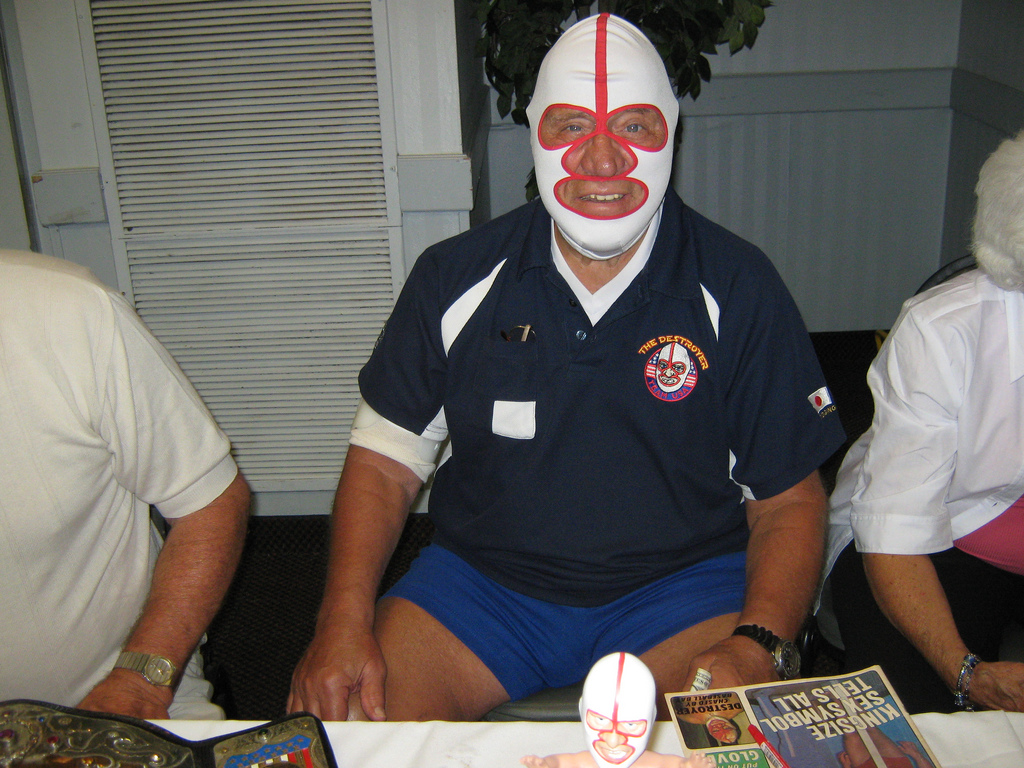
Beyer in June 2010.

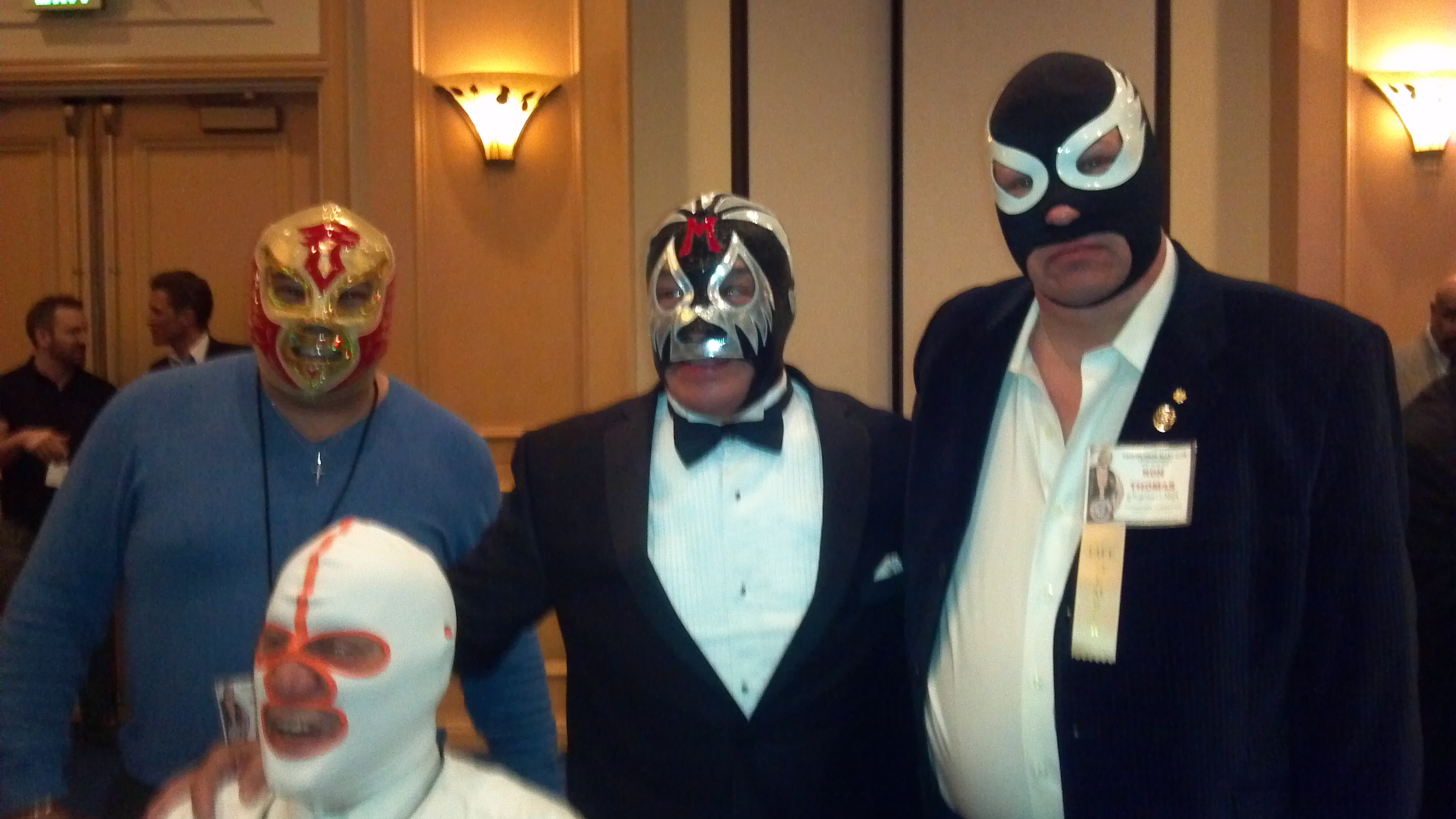
Beyer (left) with Mil Máscaras and Nighthawk.

Beyer went into semi-retirement in Akron, New York, in 1984. Until 1995, he taught physical education in the Akron Central School District, and coached football, wrestling and swimming. He served on the board of directors of the Cauliflower Alley Club, which holds annual reunions in Las Vegas. He was a member of Toastmasters International, a public speaking club, and carried the club designation of Certified Toastmaster. He inducted Gorgeous George into the WWE Hall of Fame on March 27, 2010.

On August 27, 2011, Beyer, along with his son, returned to Japan to take part in All Together, a charity event copromoted by AJPW, New Japan Pro-Wrestling and Pro Wrestling Noah. Appearing under his Destroyer mask, he hosted the Destroyer Cup and presented a trophy to its winner, Kentaro Shiga. In 2013, he opened Destroyer Park Golf in Akron, the first park golf course in the United States.

On November 4, 2017, the Japanese government awarded Beyer the Order of the Rising Sun, Gold and Silver Rays, for "a lifetime spent promoting goodwill and bi-cultural exchanges between Japan and the United States".

Beyer died in his bed at his home in Akron on March 7, 2019, at the age of 88, surrounded by his wife and all of his children. He had been suffering from health issues and spent time in hospice care.

== Championships and accomplishments ==
- 50th State Big Time Wrestling
  - NWA North American Heavyweight Championship (Hawaii version) (1 time)
- All Japan Pro Wrestling
  - PWF United States Heavyweight Championship (4 times)
  - All Asia Tag Team Championship (1 time) - with Billy Red Lyons
  - January 2 Korakuen Hall Heavyweight Battle Royal (1979)
  - January 3 Korakuen Hall Battle Royal (1975)
  - Champion Carnival Technical Award (1977)
  - Champion Carnival Fighting Spirit Award (1979)
- American Wrestling Alliance
  - AWA World Tag Team Championship (San Francisco version) (1 time) - with Billy Red Lyons
- American Wrestling Association
  - AWA British Empire Championship (1 time)
  - AWA World Heavyweight Championship (1 time)
- Cauliflower Alley Club
  - Iron Mike Mazurki Award Cauliflower Alley Club 1996
- George Tragos/Lou Thesz Professional Wrestling Hall of Fame
  - Class of 2002
- Lutte Internationale
  - Canadian International Heavyweight Championship (1 time)
- NWA Big Time Wrestling
  - NWA World Tag Team Championship (1 time) - with Golden Terror
- NWA Los Angeles
  - NWA International Television Tag Team Championship (Los Angeles version) (1 time) - with Don Manoukian
- Pacific Northwest Wrestling
  - NWA Pacific Northwest Heavyweight Championship (2 times)
  - NWA Pacific Northwest Tag Team Championship (3 times) - with Art Michalik (3)
- Professional Wrestling Hall of Fame and Museum
  - Class of 2005
  - New York State Award (2003)
- Pro Wrestling Illustrated
  - Stanley Wetson Award (2017)
- Ring Around The Northwest Newsletter
  - Tag Team of the Year (1963–1964) with Art Mahilik
  - Wrestler of the Year (1964)
- Tokyo Sports
  - Popularity Award (1975)
- World Wrestling Alliance (San Francisco)
  - WWA World Tag Team Championship (1 time) - with Billy Red Lyons
- Worldwide Wrestling Associates
  - WWA World Heavyweight Championship (3 times)
  - WWA International Television Tag Team Championship (1 time) - with Don Manoukian
  - WWA World Tag Team Championship (2 times) - with Hard Boiled Haggerty
- Wrestling Observer Newsletter awards
  - Wrestling Observer Newsletter Hall of Fame (Class of 1996)
