= All Japan Pro Wrestling =

Japanese professional wrestling promotion

- Acronym: AJPW (occasionally AJP)
- Founded: October 21, 1972; 54 years ago
- Style: King's Road style
- Headquarters: Yushima Bunkyou-ku, Tokyo, Japan
- Founder: Shohei "Giant" Baba
- Owner: Tsuyoki Fukuda
- Split from: Japan Pro Wrestling Alliance
- Website: all-japan.co.jp

All Japan Pro-Wrestling (全日本プロレス, Zen Nihon Puroresu; operating as All Japan Pro-Wrestling Co., Ltd. (オールジャパン・プロレスリング株式会社, Ōru Japan puroresuringu Kabushiki-gaisha) and usually abbreviated as AJPW or All Japan) is a Japanese professional wrestling promotion.

A promotion bult on the Ōdō (王道; "King's Road" or "Royal Road") style of wrestling, All Japan was founded on October 21, 1972 by Shohei "Giant" Baba after he and Antonio Inoki left the Japanese Wrestling Association to establish new promotions. Many wrestlers had left with Baba, with many more joining the following year when the JWA folded. From the mid-1970s, All Japan was firmly established as a contender for the largest wrestling promotion in Japan along with its rival New Japan Pro-Wrestling (founded by Inoki). Their roster had increased to include several wrestlers associated with the National Wrestling Alliance, such as Stan Hansen, Ric Flair, Terry Funk and Dory Funk Jr., and Harley Race among others. Their native talent consisted of Baba, as well as the Baba-heralded ace Jumbo Tsuruta, Genichiro Tenryu, junior wrestler Masanobu Fuchi and the defected NJPW wrestler Riki Choshu.

As the 1990s began and Tenryu had split from All Japan to form the Super World of Sports (SWS) promotion, stars like Tsuruta and Fuchi gave way to a younger generation; including the Four Heavenly Kings (プロレスの四天王, Puroresu no shiten'nō; also called the Four Pillars of Heaven): Mitsuharu Misawa, Kenta Kobashi, Toshiaki Kawada and Akira Taue as well as Jun Akiyama, Tsuyoshi Kikuchi, and gaijin wrestler Steve Williams. These wrestlers, led to perhaps All Japan's most profitable period in the 1990s. Western journalists such as Dave Meltzer delivered high praise of All Japan and its wrestlers, including Misawa, Kobashi and Kawada. Several matches that include the Kings and others within All Japan in the 1990s were given five-stars or more by Meltzer, and some are even purported to be some of the greatest matches in wrestling history.

In 1999, Giant Baba died and the promotion was run by his widow, Motoko. Misawa was named president but left in 2000 after disagreements with Motoko. Misawa created Pro Wrestling Noah and every single native wrestler besides Masanobu Fuchi and Toshiaki Kawada left All Japan. This led to a loss of All Japan's TV deal and a period of hardship for the company. In 2001, they entered a cross-promotion agreement with New Japan Pro-Wrestling which proved very successful, allowing All Japan to remain one of the larger promotions in the country, although now firmly behind NJPW. In January 2002, Keiji Muto defected to All Japan, and was officially appointed as its new president that September. He would then acquire the rights to the company and Baba family stock by early 2003. By mid-2005, All Japan's attendance had dropped and the promotion seemed to be in trouble again; but by 2007, All Japan had new sponsors and seemed to have recovered.

With established wrestlers such as Muto and 2000s ace Suwama, as well as Satoshi Kojima, Masakatsu Funaki and Minoru Suzuki providing experience and drawing power, younger wrestlers were given opportunities to develop. By 2010, those younger wrestlers were increasingly positioned to take on larger roles within the promotion. Although the promotion continued to operate without a major television deal, All Japan had maintained a continuous presence since its founding in 1972, making it one of Japan's longest-running wrestling promotions. Today, wrestlers such as Reiwa era ace Kento Miyahara, Yuma Aoyagi, Yuma Anzai and the Saito Brothers continue to represent All Japan nationally. All Japan is a member of the United Japan Pro-Wrestling association, with president Tsuyoki Fukuda being a director for the association; as such in UJPW, they have frequently collaborated with other wrestling promotions and freelance talents to boost their strengths.

== History ==
=== All Japan under Giant Baba (1972–1999) ===
==== NWA membership ====
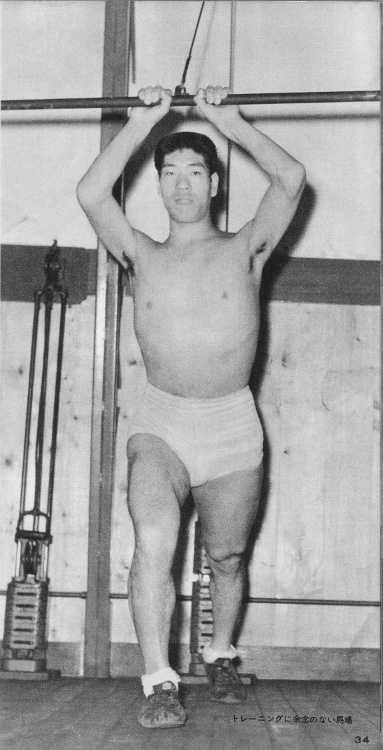
Giant Baba, the founder of All Japan and owner until his death in January 1999

The promotion was founded by Shohei "Giant" Baba and the Momota brothers, Mitsuo and Yoshihiro, sons of Rikidōzan. Baba, a former professional baseball pitcher, joined the Japan Pro Wrestling Alliance (JWA) in 1960. In October 1972, he left the JWA and formed his own group, All Japan. Their first card was on October 21, 1972, at Machida City Gym in Tokyo, Japan. The inaugural roster included Baba, Mitsuo Momota, Akio Sato, Samson Kutsuwada, Motoshi Okuma and Mashio Koma. Thunder Sugiyama, who had recently left International Wrestling Enterprise, also came along to help and brought some lower-level IWE wrestlers with him on a freelance basis. Some personalities from North America also helped with the few cards, including Dory Funk Sr., Terry Funk, Bruno Sammartino, Dominic DeNucci, Freddie Blassie and The Destroyer.

Baba established the Pacific Wrestling Federation (PWF) as the governing body for all future titles in All Japan. In the beginning the PWF recognized a world heavyweight championship and several "regional championships" given as billing to foreign stars depending from which region they came from, but after All Japan joined the National Wrestling Alliance (NWA), the PWF world title was downgraded to a regional championship. The first PWF Chairman, who presented the belts to the winners in title bouts, was Lord James Blears. As a loyal member of the NWA, All Japan enjoyed the ability to bring in foreigners, and the NWA World Heavyweight Championship was frequently defended. In the beginning Baba continued the Japanese vs. foreigner formula for the championships, but gradually Dory Funk Jr. and his brother Terry Funk, as well as Mil Máscaras from Mexico became fan favorites when wrestling other foreigners and subsequently one of the few foreign wrestlers to become icons in Japan.

==== Separation from the NWA, new stars and company growth ====
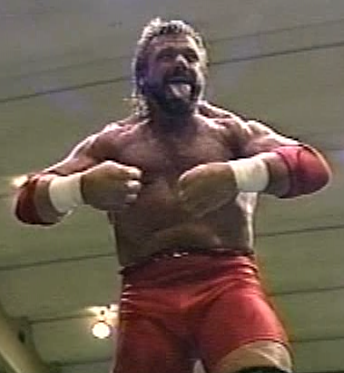
"Dr. Death" Steve Williams became one of AJPW's most successful gaijins after winning the Triple Crown Heavyweight Championship in 1994.

When the NWA territorial system collapsed in the late 1980s and early 1990s, Baba distanced himself from other promoters at home and abroad, and began a system of promoting talent (both Japanese and foreign) who competed exclusively for his promotion. With the unification of the titles in All Japan into the Triple Crown Heavyweight and the World Tag Team Championship, as well as the promotion of talent including Jumbo Tsuruta, Genichiro Tenryu, Akira Taue, Mitsuharu Misawa, Toshiaki Kawada and Kenta Kobashi, the promotion was able to carve a loyal fanbase that lasted during the 1990s. Interpromotional matches were rare, and wrestlers who arrived from other Japanese promotions (such as Hiroshi Hase, Shigeo Okumura and Yoshihiro Takayama) were not given pushes, but in Hase's case, it was voluntarily, due to his primary involvement with the House of Councillors.

Gaijins who signed with AJPW full-time were given pushes regardless of which promotion they arrived, most notably Stan Hansen, "Dr. Death" Steve Williams, Gary Albright, Vader and Mike Barton.

All Japan would achieve its third best-selling attendance with an attendance of 58,300 in the Tokyo Dome on the May 1, 1998 pay-per-view, having seen consistent growth since 1992. On the March 4, 1992 pay-per-view All Japan sold out the Nippon Budokan for the first time, with an attendance of 16,300.

All Japan's highest-selling show was the Giant Baba Memorial pay-per-view on May 2, 1999, which sold out the Tokyo Dome with an attendance of 65,000. The January 28, 2001 pay-per-view was All Japan's second highest attendance of all time at 58,700, which was notable for Stan Hansen's retirement and the Steve Williams vs. Mike Barton Brawl For All revenge angle. The last two matches of the card featuring Keiji Muto vs. Taiyō Kea, as well as the main event tag-team match, did not appear on the initial television broadcast in 2001, the original broadcast instead ending with Williams finally getting his redemption and defeating Barton in the main event.

==== First exodus: Super World of Sports ====
In April 1990, Genichiro Tenryu led the first exodus of wrestlers (The Great Kabuki, Samson Fuyuki, Tatsumi Kitahara, Masao Orihara, Yoshiaki Yatsu, Goro Tsurumi, and Shinichi Nakano) lured as they were to form Super World of Sports, which enabled Baba to push Misawa, Kawada, Taue and Kobashi to be his new stars.

=== All Japan under Mitsuharu Misawa (1999–2000) ===
With the death of Shohei "Giant" Baba on January 31, 1999, top star Mitsuharu Misawa immediately inherited the position of company president. On May 28, 2000, Misawa was removed from his position by a majority vote of the executive board. At a regular All Japan board meeting on June 13, 2000, Misawa, Mitsuo Momota (co-vice president, member of directory), Kenta Kobashi (member of directory), Akira Taue (member of directory, chairman), Kenichi Oyagi (member of directory) and Yoshihiro Momota (member of directory) resigned from their board positions. A day later, Motoko Baba ("Mrs. Baba") released a two-page written statement, which claimed that Misawa "took no responsibility and abandoned his duty." In addition, she hinted that Toshiaki Kawada and Masanobu Fuchi would be the only two native wrestlers to stay with All Japan, as "Kawada and Fuchi have sworn to carry out Baba-san's last wish: to keep All Japan Pro-Wrestling alive"; this was confirmed a day later when Kawada and Fuchi both renewed their contracts with All Japan, along with referee Kyohei Wada. The gaijin wrestlers that chose to stay with AJPW were Maunakea Mossman, Johnny Smith, George Hines, Mike Barton, Jim Steele, Mike Rotunda, Stan Hansen and "Dr. Death" Steve Williams, while Scorpio, Vader and Richard Slinger joined Misawa's crew. Not wanting to choose sides, Johnny Ace would retire from active competition and return to World Championship Wrestling in the United States as a road agent.

==== Second exodus: Pro Wrestling Noah ====
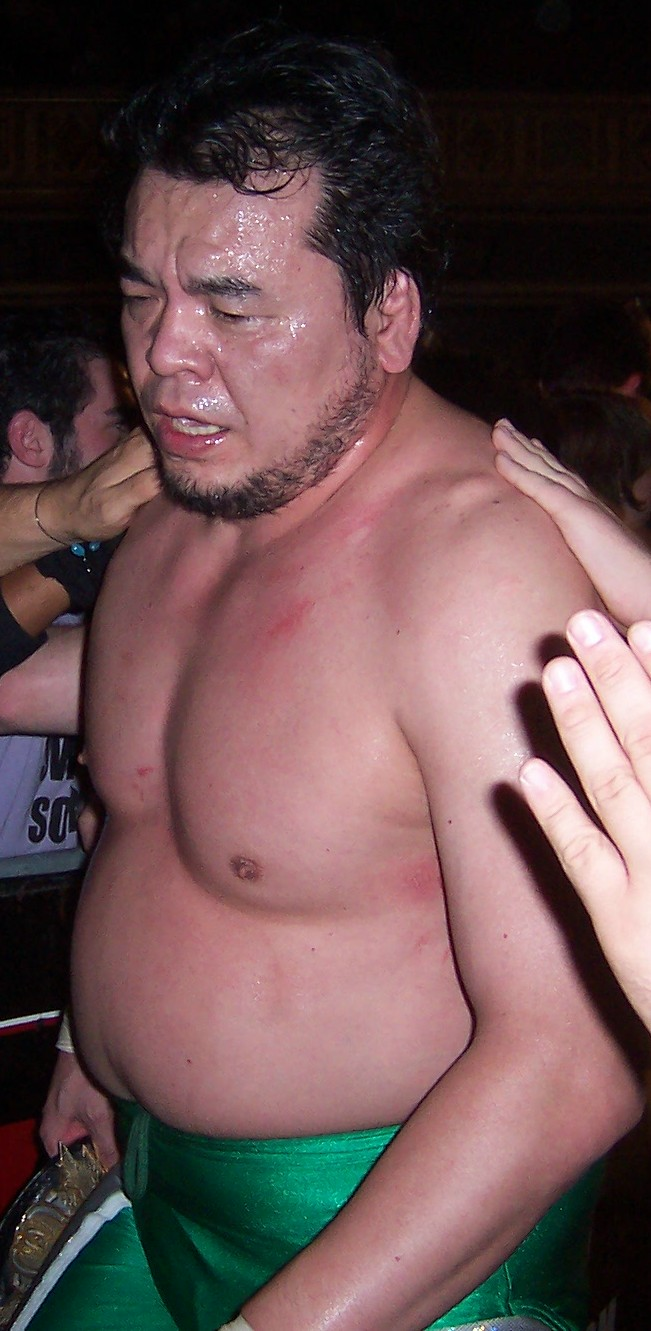
Mitsuharu Misawa left All Japan in June 2000 to form Pro Wrestling Noah.

On June 16, 2000, 24 out of the 26 contracted native wrestlers for All Japan were led by Misawa for a press conference, where it was announced that they would be leaving the promotion (Masanobu Fuchi and Toshiaki Kawada remained). More than 100 reporters and photographers attended the press conference, and Misawa expressed his wish for the promotion to debut in August, with the Differ Ariake being the site of the unnamed promotion's debut. When asked what his reason for leaving All Japan is, Misawa claimed that it was so he could do things in a "modern style." A day later, Misawa announced the promotion's name: Pro Wrestling Noah, which was inspired by the Biblical story where Noah built an ark and put two of every kind of animal in the world in the ark before God destroyed the world.

On June 19, 2000, it was confirmed (at a press conference at All-Japan's dojo held by Toshiaki Kawada and Masanobu Fuchi) that NTV decided to discontinue broadcasting All Japan after 27 years; however, NTV maintained their 15% stock in All Japan (as Motoko Baba held the remaining 85%), and would prevent All Japan from being put on another network. On June 20, twelve All Japan office employees resigned from their positions with the promotion, with intentions to follow Misawa to Noah. NTV also announced that they will carry weekly tapings of Misawa's Noah promotion, with the title of the program being called "Colosseo." Noah took All Japan's 30-minute timeslot on Sundays at midnight. Misawa was interviewed in Tokyo on June 21, where he announced that he and the other wrestlers leaving to form Noah would compete on four of the sixteen shows in All Japan's Summer Action Series 2000 tour, which began on July 1. NTV also aired the final All Japan TV show on the network, which aired for 45 minutes and featured footage from Jumbo Tsuruta's funeral, the Noah wrestlers' press conference from June 16, Kawada's press conference from June 19, highlights of the first ever Kawada vs. Misawa Triple Crown Heavyweight Championship match from October 21, 1992, and Toshiaki Kawada and Akira Taue vs. Yoshihiro Takayama and Takao Omori for the World Tag Team Championship from All Japan's Nippon Budokan show from June 9.

On June 28, 2000, Misawa formally announced at a press conference that Pro Wrestling Noah would debut with two consecutive shows (titled "Departure") in Differ Ariake on August 5 and 6 in Tokyo.

==== Rebuilding ====
On July 2 in the Korakuen Hall, Motoko Baba announced the unfathomable return of Genichiro Tenryu (as Giant Baba publicly swore that he would never be allowed back in All Japan, following a departure in 1990 to form the Super World of Sports), as he would team with Kawada to face Maunnakea Mossman and Stan Hansen on July 23 (at the final tour show). On July 20, 2000, Yoshinobu Kanemaru, Takeshi Morishima, Naomichi Marufuji, Kentaro Shiga, Takeshi Rikio, Mitsuo Momota, Rusher Kimura, Haruka Eigen, Tsuyoshi Kikuchi, Kenta Kobayashi, Takao Omori, Yoshihiro Takayama, Jun Izumida, Masao Inoue, Yoshinari Ogawa, Akira Taue, Jun Akiyama and Mitsuharu Misawa competed in their last matches for All Japan Pro-Wrestling at the sold out Hakata Star Lane in Fukuoka. After the show, "Dr. Death" Steve Williams came out and shook Misawa's hand, and requested one last singles match between the two. However, Misawa returned to the bus immediately after his match, not staying for the last two matches of the show. Every one of All Japan's titles were vacated due to the departure of the aforementioned wrestlers and title holders. Mrs. Baba appointed Stan Hansen as the new Chairman of All Japan's Pacific Wrestling Federation title governing body, replacing Lord James Blears.

=== Interpromotional feud against New Japan (2000–2002) ===
On August 10, 2000, All Japan mainstay Masanobu Fuchi walked into the New Japan Pro-Wrestling ring and declared that his intention was to "break down the walls" between All Japan and New Japan. In response, New Japan foreman Riki Choshu rushed into the ring and exchanged a firm handshake with Fuchi, signaling the beginning of the cross-promotional alliance. On September 16, 2000, Toshiaki Kawada followed Fuchi's path and vowed to crush New Japan ace Kensuke Sasaki, as he defeated Sasaki in the Tokyo Dome on October 9, 2000; the event sold out the building. In 2001, Keiji Muto and Shinjiro Otani created the interpromotional stable BATT (Bad Ass Translate Trading), which included All Japan's Taiyō Kea, Michinoku Pro's Jinsei Shinzaki and Hiroshi Hase. During this time, Muto challenged and defeated Tenryu for the Triple Crown Heavyweight Championship, as well as capturing the World Tag Team Championship with Taiyō Kea. The alliance between the promotions lasted until January 11, 2002.

=== All Japan under Keiji Muto: Pro Wrestling Love era (2002–2013) ===
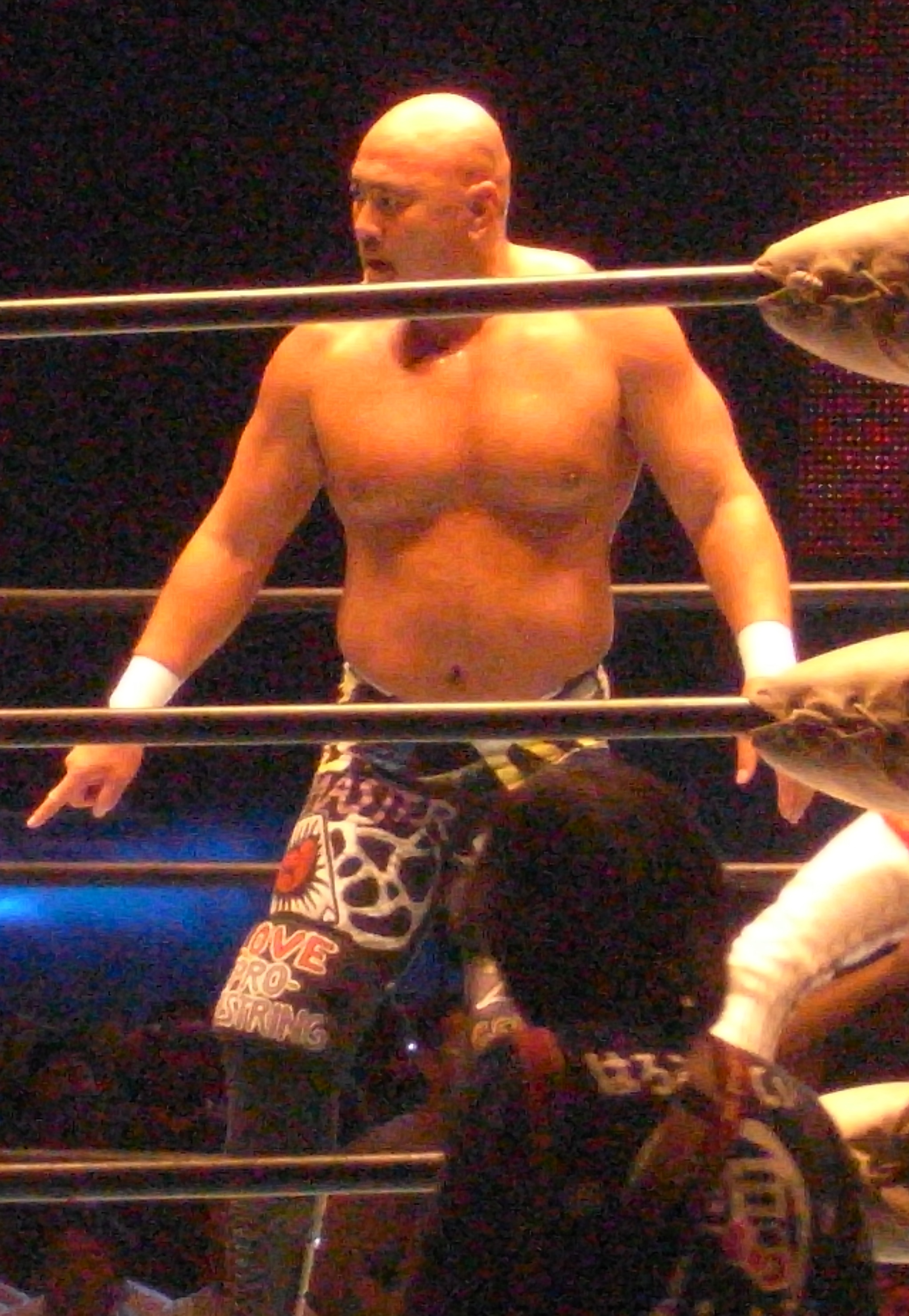
Keiji Muto in 2008 during the Pro Wrestling Love era. This was also his main attire in the era's early days.

==== Start of the Pro Wrestling Love era ====
Signs of what would become the Pro Wrestling Love era would be seen in the spring and summer of 2001, when Keiji Muto, as a member of New Japan Pro-Wrestling, made part-time appearances to All Japan, fighting Toshiaki Kawada and "Dr. Death" Steve Williams in major singles matches on pay-per-view. A notable shift in the product was seen in July 2001, when in a pay-per-view main event, Steve Williams lost to Keiji Muto for the Triple Crown Heavyweight Championship, where it ended in an altercation. After leaving the backstage area Williams would then going on a huge swearing tirade, where he kicked a trash can, was about to cry in tears, and then throwing his armpads to the ground while swearing again. On January 11, 2002, following the end of a year-long cross-promotional angle with New Japan Pro-Wrestling, Keiji Muto shocked the Japanese wrestling world by defecting to All-Japan as a full-time competitor, taking Satoshi Kojima and Kendo Kashin with him. This is considered the official start of the era.

==== Company turmoil and sale of All Japan ====
On September 30, 2002, during an All Japan 30th Anniversary party at the famed Tokyo City Hotel, Mrs. Baba officially announced Muto's appointment as the new president of All Japan, transferring all of the Baba family stock to him. Mrs. Baba's last on-screen appearance was on the October 27, 2002 pay-per-view, before leaving All Japan altogether by January 2003. Muto upheld some traditional aspects of the Baba-run All Japan, as the Champion Carnival and World's Strongest Tag Determination League remained annual events.

During this time, All Japan was struggling financially and Muto had to borrow money from Mrs. Baba as of November 28, 2002. This led to rumors that Muto was going to sell the company to Fuji TV by the time of the next WRESTLE-1 pay-per-view, which ultimately did not happen. Instead, shares of All Japan were sold to Gaora TV with the promotion still operating in its usual corporate manner led by Keiji Muto, rarely broadcasting pay-per-views and events to SKY PerfecTV! and SAMURAI TV. While Muto owned 75% of All Japan's shares beginning in 2003 after Mrs. Baba permanently left, the remaining shares went to Gaora TV, who would oversee All Japan's production and would buy the majority of the tape library post-2003. They upload several segments of their tape library to their official YouTube channel.

In January 2003, a third exodus began, primarily of gaijin wrestlers. The most notable included "Dr. Death" Steve Williams, KroniK (Brian Adams and Bryan Clark), Bill Goldberg and Mike Rotunda. They had wrestled their last matches on pay-per-views that month, not renewing their contracts after the new ownership fully realized. Williams would only make one more appearance in the Pro Wrestling Love era on a July 22, 2004 pay-per-view, who at the time was going through throat cancer recovery and made a surprise appearance. In April 2003 Johnny Smith also left AJPW, followed by George Hines in July 2003, leaving a void in the gaijin roster. In both of their cases they would defect to IWA Japan, where Williams and Rotunda would also go find work. However, despite his material being shown on IWA TV, Smith's planned in-ring debut in March 2004 for IWA Japan never happened due to him choosing to permanently retire because of his aforementioned injury.

==== Later Pro Wrestling Love era ====
On July 10, 2007, Hiroshi Hase was appointed as the new Chairman of the Pacific Wrestling Federation, following Stan Hansen's voluntary resignation. Hase is the third chairman in PWF's history. Joe Doering would become the main gaijin around this time.

October 12, 2007 Baseball Magazine Sha, the publisher of Puroresu Shukan released AJPW trading cards.

On June 7, 2011, Keiji Muto announced his resignation as the President of All Japan Pro-Wrestling and named Masayuki Uchida as his successor.

On August 28, 2012, AJPW and Gaora TV announced that AJPW would introduce a new championship called the Gaora TV Championship. The tournament for the title began on September 8, and ended on October 7 with Seiya Sanada defeating Yasufumi Nakanoue in the final to become the inaugural champion.

The "Pro Wrestling Love" name and theme was retired on July 5, 2013, thus ending the era.

=== All Japan under Nobuo Shiraishi (2012–2014) ===
On November 1, 2012, IT company Speed Partners purchased all shares of All Japan from Keiji Muto and his business partners like Gaora TV for ¥200 million, however, the purchase was not made public until February 2013. In January 2013, AJPW signed Atsushi Aoki, Go Shiozaki, Jun Akiyama, Kotaro Suzuki and Yoshinobu Kanemaru, all of whom had quit Pro Wrestling Noah the previous month, to return to AJPW, initially as freelancers. On March 17, 2013, it was announced that Hiroshi Hase was stepping down as Pacific Wrestling Federation Chairman, and that he would be succeeded by Kenta Kobashi, following Kobashi's retirement as a professional wrestler on May 11, 2013.

==== Fourth exodus: Wrestle-1 ====
On May 1, 2013, it was reported that negotiations had started between Speed Partners president Nobuo Shiraishi and All Japan president Masayuki Uchida, which would see Keiji Muto regain the promotion's presidency before the end of the month. However, on May 27, it was reported that Shiraishi himself would take over the presidency of All Japan effective June 1. This was later confirmed by All Japan, and led to Keiji Muto's resignation from the promotion. In the weeks that followed, Masakatsu Funaki, Kaz Hayashi, Shuji Kondo, Ryota Hama, Masayuki Kono, Hiroshi Yamato, Koji Kanemoto, Minoru Tanaka, Yasufumi Nakanoue, Kai, Seiya Sanada and Andy Wu announced their resignation from the promotion out of loyalty to Muto.

They all left the promotion following a June 30 event in Ryōgoku Kokugikan (the TV taping for the July 5 episode where the Pro Wrestling Love era ended) and went on to form the Wrestle-1 promotion the following month and announced their first show was held September 8 at Tokyo Dome City Hall. At the event, the Gaora TV Champion René Dupree made his debut in Wrestle-1, leaving AJPW. Before the end of the year, Manabu Soya also quit All Japan to jump to Wrestle-1.

==== Rebuilding ====
After the exodus (along with the departures of ring announcer Makoto Abe and referees Daichi Murayama and Daisuke Kanbayashi), the promotion has now been reduced to less than half the active roster. On June 21, 2013, it was revealed that since 2009, AJPW mainstay Masanobu Fuchi, who has been with the promotion since debuting in 1974, had long since resigned from the AJPW Board of Directors and has not been on an exclusive contract due to his age, thus becoming a freelancer, but chose to stay with AJPW on a pay per performance basis. On July 5, 2013, all five members of Burning (Akiyama, Shiozaki, Aoki, Suzuki, and Kanemaru) officially signed exclusive contracts with AJPW, ending their tenure as freelancers, along with the returns of Taiyo Kea and referee Kyohei Wada. On July 14, during the launching event of the post-Muto All Japan, Masanobu Fuchi announced that he had officially re-signed with the promotion not only as a wrestler, but also as a member of the Board of Directors, ending his tenure as a freelancer. On August 1, all of the All Japan shares were moved from Speed Partners to Shiraishi's Red Wall Japan corporation, which effectively became the new parent company of the promotion. Meanwhile, the promotion's corporate name was changed to "Zen Nihon Puroresu Systems". On August 7, it was reported that All Japan had agreed to return the NWA International Heavyweight, NWA United National and PWF World Heavyweight Championship belts, which make up the Triple Crown Heavyweight Championship, to Motoko Baba, the widow of the promotion's founder Giant Baba, bringing an end to the final remnant of the Giant Baba All Japan. The Triple Crown Heavyweight Championship retained its old name, but All Japan introduced a new title belt to represent it. The three original belts were defended for the last time on August 25, when Suwama successfully defended them against Go Shiozaki. The new title belt was revealed on October 27. On August 27, Shiraishi announced that he would be stepping down as the All Japan president by the end of the month. He would, however, remain the owner of the promotion. On September 1, longtime freelancer Akebono signed a contract to officially join All Japan full-time. On September 11, Hirota Inoue, one of the executive directors originally brought to the promotion by Shiraishi, was announced as the new president of All Japan. On October 27, Dory Funk, Jr. was announced as the new Pacific Wrestling Federation chairman.

=== All Japan under Jun Akiyama (2014–2020) ===
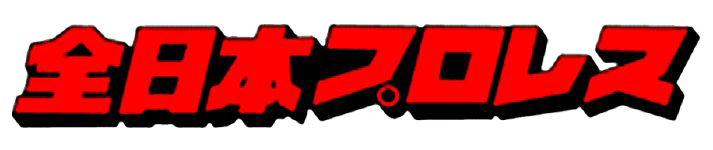
The alternate logo for All Japan, used since 2016

On June 5, 2014, All Japan announced a corporate restructuring taking place on July 1, which would see Jun Akiyama take over as the promotion's new president. On July 1, the promotion announced another corporate name change to "All Japan Pro-Wrestling Kabushiki-gaisha" (dropping the Japanese "Zen Nihon Puroresu" name for business purposes, but not overall purposes), while also relocating its headquarters from Tokyo to Yokohama. Akiyama established a new company named Zen Nihon Puroresu Innovation, through which he will run the new All Japan Pro-Wrestling. Akiyama also serves as the representative director of the promotion and reports to a board of directors, which most notably includes Suwama and Akebono. Motoko Baba also joined the promotion as a consultant. On September 28, 2015, Go Shiozaki announced his resignation from All Japan. On November 2, it was announced that Akebono was also leaving All Japan with the goal of returning to mixed martial arts. On November 16, yet another wrestler, the reigning World Junior Heavyweight Champion Kotaro Suzuki, announced his departure from All Japan at the end of the month. Four days later, Yoshinobu Kanemaru also announced he would be leaving All Japan following December 15. Akiyama revealed that the departures were all for the same reason: All Japan had recently decided to change all of its wrestler contracts to pay-per-appearance contracts. In October 2016, the promotion announced it had reached a deal with satellite television provider Nippon BS Broadcasting for a monthly highlights show, Eleven, to be broadcast on the third Monday of each month. On November 27, 2016, the promotion returned to Ryōgoku Kokugikan for its first event at the venue in three years, headlined by Kento Miyahara defending the Triple Crown Heavyweight Championship against Suwama. In August 2017 Toryumon Mexico started working with All Japan Pro-Wrestling in with a collaborated event tour called Lucha Fiesta. On February 4, 2018, AJPW announced "All Japan Pro-Wrestling TV", a new worldwide streaming site for the promotion's events. On October 10, 2019, Akiyama left his position as president to become General Manager. Tsuyoki Fukuda was later made president of AJPW.

=== All Japan under Tsuyoki Fukuda (2020–present) ===
On April 2, 2020, AJPW president Tsuyoki Fukuda decided to cancel the 2020 Champion Carnival in April, with the tournament being rescheduled for a later date and three opening shows of the Super Power Series 2020 tour would also be canceled following that the promotion would start to do empty arenas shows at 2AW's 2AW Square arena. On June 26, AJPW General Manager Jun Akiyama announced that he would leave AJPW for DDT after nine years with the promotion and announced that management of the promotion would be transferred to Tsuyoki Fukuda. On November 14, AJPW announced the creation of its sixth active title and the first six-man tag team championship in the promotion's history, the AJPW TV Six-Man Tag Team Championship. On November 28, the board of directors Suwama announced the launching of AJPW's own women's division "Evolution's Girls". Suwama announced that he would be heading the division alongside Shuji Ishikawa, intending to recruit and hopes to train women wrestlers for the promotion. In April, during an interview with Tokyo Sports, Suwama expressed his intention to establish a women's division, however, his plans were delayed due to the COVID-19 pandemic. Afterwards, AJPW also established a working relationship with Joshi promotion Ice Ribbon, during which Tsukasa Fujimoto was announced as an advisor for the new division.

On May 7, 2021, the Japanese government announced an extension to the state of emergency currently in place in Tokyo and other prefectures, leading AJPW to postpone their event on May 15 at Ota City General Gymnasium to June 26. On June 26, it was announced since the creation of the Triple Crown Heavyweight Champion that the title would be decided in a Tomoe Battle, where in cooperation with the Baba family, Jake Lee would bring the NWA International Heavyweight Championship, Kento Miyahara the PWF World Heavyweight Championship and Yuma Aoyagi the NWA United National Championship to symbolize the origin of the title belt. This kind of match was last fought at the 1997 Champion Carnival where Toshiaki Kawada defeated Mitsuharu Misawa and Kenta Kobashi to win the tournament, the match usually starts with consecutive singles matches between three wrestlers, which wrestler who have two wins in a row first is declared the winner. On October 18, 2021, Zeus announced his resignation from All Japan after he had purchased all shares of Osaka Pro Wrestling from Yuji Sakagami announcing that he would be leaving the promotion on December 31 when his contract expires. Zeus himself expressed interest in a future collaboration between AJPW and Osaka Pro, with whom Zeus previously worked in the past which would also lead to more departures with Naoya Nomura and Koji Iwamoto announcing on December 5, that he would also be leaving the promotion on December 31 when their contract expires only to Nomura return to the promotion in June 2022. On July 12, 2022, it was announced that AJPW would be celebrating its 50th anniversary event on September 18, 2022, at the Nippon Budokan, marking the return of the promotion to the arena for the first time in eighteen years.

On December 15, 2023, AJPW was announced as one of the founding members of the United Japan Pro-Wrestling alliance, a joint effort to further develop professional wrestling in Japan through promotion and organization, with Seiji Sakaguchi being named as the chairman of the project. On August 29, 2026, following the death of long time PWF chairman Dory Funk, Jr., Stan Hansen was appointed to the position a second time.

== Roster and current champions ==
Championship	Current champion(s)	Reign	Date won	Days held	Location	Notes
Triple Crown Heavyweight Championship	Kento Miyahara	7	September 23, 2025	407	Tokyo, Japan	Defeated Jun Saito at Giant Dream 2025.
World Tag Team Championship	Saito Brothers (Jun Saito and Rei Saito)	3 (3, 3)	June 6, 2026	151	Kakuda, Japan	Defeated Titans Of Calamity (Ren Ayabe and Talos) at Super Power Series 2026.
World Junior Heavyweight Championship	Dan Tamura	2	June 18, 2026	139	Tokyo, Japan	Defeated Seigo Tachibana at Super Power Series 2026.
All Asia Tag Team Championship	Musashi and Seiki Yoshioka	3	October 11, 2026	24	Sendai, Japan	Defeated Dan Tamura and Seigo Tachibana for the vacant titles at Raising An Army Memorial Series 2026.
Gaora TV Championship	Oddyssey	1	November 3, 2026	1	Tokyo, Japan	Defeated Masaaki Mochizuki at Hokkaido Dynamite Series 2026.
AJPW TV Six-Man Tag Team Championship	Go Shiozaki, Yasutaka Yano and Yuma Aoyagi	1 (1, 1, 2)	October 27, 2026	8	Tomakomai, Japan	Defeated Hideki Suzuki, Masayuki Kono and Shota Kofuji at Hokkaido Dynamite Series 2026.

Titles previously promoted by the company include

- Titles that were originally part of the Triple Crown Heavyweight Championship
  - NWA International Heavyweight Championship
  - NWA United National Championship
  - PWF World Heavyweight Championship
- Titles that are now part of the World Tag Team Championship
  - NWA International Tag Team Championship
  - PWF World Tag Team Championship
- Others
  - NWA International Junior Heavyweight Championship (replaced with World Junior Heavyweight Championship)
  - PWF United States Heavyweight Championship
  - F-1 Tag Team Championship (transferred to and promoted by Wrestle-1 until its closure)
- Shared
  - All Asia Heavyweight Championship (now promoted by Pro Wrestling Land's End under Pacific Wrestling Federation authorization)
  - United National Tag Team Championship (promoted by Tenryu Project under Pacific Wrestling Federation authorization)

== Tournaments ==
AJPW also holds annual tournaments to decide the top wrestler or tag team in the promotion:

Tournament	Latest winner(s)	Date won
Champion Carnival	Hideki Suzuki	May 17, 2026
Jr. Battle of Glory	Seiki Yoshioka	August 29, 2026
Jr. Tag Battle of Glory	Atsuki Aoyagi and Rising Hayato	March 20, 2026
Ōdō Tournament	Ryuki Honda	September 22, 2026
World's Strongest Tag Determination League	Ren Ayabe and Talos	December 10, 2025

== Broadcasters ==
Domestic:

- Gaora (2000–present, broadcasting monthly show B-Banquet and live specials; formerly broadcasting archive show Battle Archives)
- Fighting TV Samurai (2000–present, broadcasting live and taped shows; formerly broadcasting weekly show King's Road and archive show Royal Road Club)
- Nico Nico Douga (2016–present, streaming untelevised spot-shows and interviews)
- Amazon Prime Video Japan (2020–present)

Worldwide:

- All Japan Pro-Wrestling TV (streaming service, in partnership with Gaora, broadcasting most AJPW shows live, as well as on-demand)

=== Former ===
- Nippon Television (1972–2000, continues to air AJPW footage unbranded as Wrestling Classics on NTV G+)
- Broadcast syndication, Japanese Association of Independent Television Stations (1994–2013, intermittent weekly programming and specials)
- BS11 (2016–2018, broadcasting highlight/magazine show Eleven)

International (former):

- FITE TV (2017–2018)

== See also ==
- Professional wrestling in Japan
- List of professional wrestling promotions in Japan
