= PWF World Tag Team Championship =

Professional wrestling tag team championship

Details
- Promotion: All Japan Pro Wrestling; Pacific Wrestling Federation

The Pacific Wrestling Federation (PWF) World Tag Team Championship was a professional wrestling tag team championship in All Japan Pro Wrestling, created in 1984. It was unified with the NWA International Tag Team Championship in 1988, to create the World Tag Team Championship, or Double Cup.

== Title history ==
Key

| Symbol | Meaning |
| No. | The overall championship reign |
| Reign | The reign number for the specific wrestler listed. |
| Event | The event in which the championship changed hands |
| N/A | The specific information is not known |
| — | Used for vacated reigns in order to not count it as an official reign |
| [Note #] | Indicates that the exact length of the title reign is unknown, with a note providing more details. |

| # | Team | Reign | Date | Days held | Location | Event | Notes | Ref. |
|---|---|---|---|---|---|---|---|---|
All Japan Pro Wrestling (AJPW)
| 1 | Chōjū Konbi (Bruiser Brody and Stan Hansen) | 1 | April 25, 1984 | 463 - 493 | Yokohama, Japan | House show | Defeated Giant Baba and Dory Funk, Jr. in a tournament final. | |
| 2 | Ted DiBiase and Stan Hansen (2) | 1 | August 1985 | 671 - 701 | N/A | N/A | DiBiase was selected as Hansen's replacement partner after Brody left for New Japan Pro-Wrestling on March 21, 1985. | |
| 3 | Tiger Mask II and Jumbo Tsuruta | 1 | July 3, 1987 | 8 | Tokyo, Japan | House show | | |
| 4 | Ted DiBiase (2) and Stan Hansen (3) | 2 | July 11, 1987 | 1 - 20 | Yonago, Japan | House show | | |
| - | Vacated | - | July 1987 | N/A | N/A | N/A | Vacated when DiBiase leaves for the World Wrestling Federation. | |
| 5 | Stan Hansen (4) and Austin Idol | 1 | August 1987 | 3 - 33 | N/A | N/A | Hansen and Idol were awarded the titles. | |
| 6 | Ryūgenhō (Ashura Hara and Genichiro Tenryu) | 1 | September 3, 1987 | 275 | Nagoya, Japan | House show | | |
| 7 | Gorin Konbi (Jumbo Tsuruta (2) and Yoshiaki Yatsu) | 1 | June 4, 1988 | 6 | Sapporo, Japan | House show | Tsuruta and Yatsu won the NWA International Tag Team Championship on June 10, defeating The Road Warriors. | |
Pacific Wrestling Federation (PWF)
| - | Unified | - | June 10, 1988 | N/A | N/A | N/A | The NWA International Tag Team Championship and PWF World Tag Team Championship were unified and made into the World Tag Team Championship. | |

== List of combined reigns ==
=== By Team ===
| Rank | Team | # Of Reigns | Combined Days |
|---|---|---|---|
| 1 | Ted DiBiase and Stan Hansen | 2 | 672-721 |
| 2 | Chōjū Konbi (Bruiser Brody and Stan Hansen) | 1 | 463-493 |
| 3 | Ryūgenhō (Ashura Hara and Genichiro Tenryu) | 1 | 275 |
| 4 | Tiger Mask II and Jumbo Tsuruta | 1 | 8 |
| 5 | Gorin Konbi (Jumbo Tsuruta and Yoshiaki Yatsu) | 1 | 6 |
| 6 | Stan Hansen and Austin Idol | 1 | 3-33 |

=== By Wrestler ===
| Rank | Team | # Of Reigns | Combined Days |
|---|---|---|---|
| 1 | Stan Hansen | 4 | 1.138-1.247 |
| 2 | Ted DiBiase | 2 | 672-721 |
| 3 | Bruiser Brody | 1 | 463-493 |
| 4 | Ashura Hara | 1 | 275 |
| 4 | Genichiro Tenryu | 1 | 275 |
| 5 | Jumbo Tsuruta | 2 | 14 |
| 6 | Tiger Mask II | 1 | 8 |
| 7 | Yoshiaki Yatsu | 1 | 6 |
| 8 | Austin Idol | 1 | 3-33 |

== See also ==
- All Japan Pro Wrestling
- NWA International Tag Team Championship
- World Tag Team Championship
