= St. Louis Wrestling Hall of Fame =

Professional wrestling hall of fame

The St. Louis Wrestling Hall of Fame is a professional wrestling hall of fame in St. Louis, United States. After several years of debating the idea of creating the Hall of Fame, former owner and promoter of the St. Louis Wrestling Club Larry Matysik opened it in 2007. He was joined in this effort by SBAC Member Tony Casta, sports journalist Keith Schildroth, collector Mitch Hartsey, and longtime fan Nick Ridenour. Although these directors oversee the selection process, the St. Louis Wrestling Hall of Fame is unique because it is the only wrestling hall of fame that allows fans to vote for potential inductees.

The Hall of Fame was created to honor the role St. Louis played in helping to establish professional wrestling in North America. Matysik also wanted to create a hall of fame that recognized wrestlers for their contributions to wrestling rather than their relationships with the owner of the promotion. To be inducted into the Hall of Fame, inductees must have held a title belt or played an important role in or around the Missouri area between 1959 and 1983, when the National Wrestling Alliance (NWA) had a strong presence in St. Louis.

For the initial group of inductions, the directors decided that Sam Muchnick, Lou Thesz, Bill Longson, Mickey Garagiola, Penny Banner, and Joe Schoenberger would be inducted by acclamation. Fans were asked to vote for seven more inductees from a list of twenty choices. At the induction ceremony, these thirteen were enshrined, along with Matysik, a surprise inductee. King Kong Brody was inducted later that year.

When the Hall of Fame opened in 2007, it was located in The Pro Wrestling Shirt Shop, a business in St. Louis' South County Mall. It contained plaques and memorabilia from the St. Louis Wrestling Club. In 2008, the Hall was moved to the South Broadway Athletic Club. Each induction plaque is personalized with a description of the individual's contributions. For example, Thesz' plaque states that he is "the finest example of a true world champion". Six more people were inducted in 2008, bringing the total to twenty-one. The Hall's directors plan to add six more inductees each year. Fourteen men and one woman have been honored for their performance in the ring as wrestlers. The remaining six people have been inducted for their other contributions, including owning and promoting the St. Louis Wrestling Club, as well as performing duties as referees, ring announcers, and commentators.

Current board members are Herb Simmons and Nick Ridenour.

== Inductees ==
#	Year	Ring name (Birth name)	Inducted for	Notes
1	2007	Penny Banner (Mary Ann Kostecki)	Women's wrestling	Born in St. Louis. She began her wrestling career working for Muchnick's St. Louis Wrestling Club; won the NWA Women's World Tag Team Championship (1 time)
2	2007	King Kong Brody (Frank Donald Goodish)	Wrestling	Posthumous inductee; inducted September 14. Won the NWA Central States Heavyweight Championship (1 time) and NWA Central States Tag Team Championship (1 time)
3	2007	Dick the Bruiser (William Richard Afflis)	Wrestling	Posthumous inductee; won the NWA Missouri Heavyweight Championship (3 times)
4	2007	Ric Flair (Richard Morgan Fliehr)^{[a]}	Wrestling	Won the NWA World Heavyweight Championship (10 times) and NWA Missouri Heavyweight Championship (1 time)
5	2007	Mickey Garagiola	Ring announcing and commentating	Longtime ring announcer and commentator for St. Louis Wrestling Club
6	2007	Gene Kiniski	Wrestling	Held NWA World Heavyweight Championship for three years; won the NWA Missouri Heavyweight Championship (1 time)
7	2007	Bill Longson (Willard Rowe Longson)	Wrestling	Posthumous inductee; won the National Wrestling Alliance World Heavyweight Championship (3 times) and NWA Central States Heavyweight Championship (1 time)
8	2007	Larry Matysik	Commentating and Promoting	Owner, office worker, booker, announcer, and commentator for St. Louis Wrestling Club; wrote biography of Sam Muchnick
9	2007	Sam Muchnick	Promoting	Posthumous inductee; founded the NWA and served as president from 1950 to 1960 and 1963 to 1975; owner of St. Louis Wrestling Club
10	2007	Pat O'Connor	Wrestling	Posthumous inductee; won the AWA World Heavyweight Championship (1 time), NWA World Heavyweight Championship (1 time), and NWA Central States Heavyweight Championship (2 times); co-owner and booker of St. Louis Wrestling Club
11	2007	Harley Race	Wrestling	Won the NWA Missouri Heavyweight Championship (7 times) and NWA World Heavyweight Championship (8 times); co-owner of St. Louis Wrestling Club
12	2007	Joe Schoenberger	Refereeing	Posthumous inductee; longtime referee for St. Louis Wrestling Club and community youth sports advocate
13	2007	Lou Thesz (Aloysius Martiz Thesz)	Wrestling	Posthumous inductee; won the NWA World Heavyweight Championship (6 times)
14	2007	Johnny Valentine (John Theodore Wisniski)	Wrestling	Posthumous inductee; won NWA Missouri Heavyweight Championship (1 time)
15	2007	Fritz Von Erich (Jack Barton Adkisson)	Wrestling	Posthumous inductee; won the AWA World Heavyweight Championship (1 time)
16	2008	Jack Brisco (Fred Joe Brisco)	Wrestling	Won the NWA World Heavyweight Championship (2 times), NWA Missouri Heavyweight Championship (2 times), and NWA Missouri Junior Heavyweight Championship (2 times)
17	2008	Dory Funk Jr.	Wrestling	Won NWA World Heavyweight Championship (1 time) and NWA Missouri Heavyweight Championship (1 time)
18	2008	Joe Garagiola	Commentating	First commentator for St. Louis Wrestling Club's Wrestling at the Chase television program
19	2008	Rocky Johnson (Wayde Douglas Bowles)	Wrestling	Competed in St. Louis from 1975 to 1986 and challenged for NWA World Heavyweight Championship on several occasions
20	2008	Buddy Rogers (Herman Gustav Rohde Jr. )	Wrestling	Posthumous inductee; won the NWA World Heavyweight Championship (1 time)
21	2008	Lee Warren	Referee	Longtime referee for St. Louis Wrestling Club
22	2009	Baron von Raschke	Wrestling	Won numerous tag team titles, including NWA World Tag Team Championship (Central States version) (1 time) – with Maurice Vachon and NWA North American Tag Team Championship (Central States version) (1 Time) – with Harley Race
23	2010	Bobby Heenan	manager	Managed various Tag Team Champions in AWA and WWE with The Heenan Family
24	2010	Terry Funk	Wrestling	Won numerous titles, including NWA World Heavyweight Championship (1 time)
25	2010	Dick Murdoch	Wrestling	Posthumous inductee; won various titles, including NWA Central States Heavyweight Championship (2 times), NWA Central States Tag Team Championship (1 time) – with Bob Brown and NWA North American Tag Team Championship (Central States version) (3 times) – with Dusty Rhodes (1) and Bob Sweetan (2)
26	2010	“Cowboy” Bob Ellis	Wrestling	
27	2014	"Million Dollar Man" Ted DiBiase	Wrestling	Multi-time holder of the NWA Missouri Heavyweight Championship and NWA Central States Heavyweight Championship among other titles in the NWA and WWE Tag Champion.
28	2014	Wilbur Snyder	Wrestling	Posthumous inductee
29	2014	Rip Hawk (Harvey Maurice Evers)	Wrestling	Posthumous inductee
30	2015	Ken Patera	Wrestling	Two-time NWA Missouri Heavyweight Championship title holder.
31	2015	Joe Tangaro	Wrestling	Posthumous inductee: Former wrestler and referee
32	2015	Eddie Smith	Wrestling	Former referee
33	2015	Bill Apter	Wrestling	Professional wrestling journalist
34	2016	Kerry Von Erich	Wrestling	Posthumous inductee; NWA World Heavyweight Champion: 1984
35	2016	David Von Erich	Wrestling	Posthumous inductee; Missouri Heavyweight Champion: 1983–84
36	2016	Kevin Von Erich	Wrestling	Missouri Heavyweight Champion: 1979–80
37	2016	Dr. Bill Miller	Wrestling	Posthumous inductee; Former American Wrestling Association Champion
38	2016	John Paul Henning	Wrestling	Posthumous inductee; Very popular wrestler in the St. Louis area during the 60's
39	2016	Charlie Venator	Referee	
40	2017	Bob Backlund	Wrestling	Former World Wrestling Entertainment Champion: 1978–83, 1994
41	2017	Édouard Carpentier	Wrestling	Posthumous inductee; NWA World Heavyweight Champion: 1957 and WWA Heavyweight Champion (Los Angeles): 1957–61, 1963–64
42	2018	Whipper Billy Watson	Wrestling	Posthumous inductee; Former NWA World Heavyweight Champion: 1947, 1956
43	2019	Bob Orton Sr	Wrestling	Posthumous inductee; Former Missouri Heavyweight Champion: 1954
44	2019	Debbie Combs	Wrestling	NWA Women's Champion: 1986–87, 1987–94, 1996
45	2022	Joyce Grable	Wrestling	Wrestled for Sam Muchnick several times during the 70's & early 80's
46	2023	Gerald Brisco	Wrestling	One half of the Brisco Brothers, long time WWE executive
47	2023	J.J. Dillon	Wrestling	Manager of The Four Horsemen
48	2024	Bob Orton Jr.	Wrestling	Commonly known by the ring name "Cowboy" Bob Orton during the 70's & 80's
49	2024	Harold Koplar	Businessman	Posthumous inductee: St. Louis businessman
50	2024	George Abel	Ring announcing	Posthumous inductee: Announcer
51	2024	Leilani kai	Wrestling	Women wrestling star of the 80's, WWF Women's Champion (one time)
52	2024	Judy Martin	Wrestling	Women wrestling star of the 80's, WWF Women's Tag team Champion (one time)
53	2024	Wendi Richter	Wrestling	Women wrestling star of the 80's, WWF Women's Champion (two times)
54	2025	Ox Baker	Wrestling	Posthumous inductee; NWA United States Heavyweight Champion (Detroit version) (one time)
55	2025	Jerry Blackwell	Wrestling	Posthumous inductee; NWA Missouri Heavyweight Champion (two times)
56	2025	Ivan Koloff	Wrestling	Posthumous inductee; WWWF World Heavyweight Champion (one time)
57	2025	Butch Reed	Wrestling	Had wrestled for Sam Muchnick in the late 70's & 80's
58	2025	Dory Funk Sr	Wrestling	Wrestled in the 60's in St. Louis against some great competition.
59	2025	Greg Valentine	Wrestling	Had some great battles with Kerry Von Erich.
60	2026	Andre The Giant	Wrestling	Sold out shows in St. Louis in the 70's.
61	2026	Spike Huber	Wrestling	Was the son in law of Dick the Bruiser.
62	2026	Johnny Rodz	Wrestling	Wrestled during the Sam Muchnick days.
63	2026	Herb Simmons	Wrestling	One of the greatest wrestling promoters in St. Louis since 1973 for SICW.
64	2027	Jimmy Valiant	Wrestling	Had some great battles in the early 70s under Sam Muchnick promotion.
65	2027	Rufus R. Jones	Wrestling	Worked in St. Louis as a face in the Early 70s under Sam Muchnick.
66	2027	Bobby Fulton	Wresting	worked in the NWA
67	2027	Bushwhacker Luke	Wrestling	One of the greatest wrestler to work in St. Louis.
68	2027	Iceman King Parsons	Wrestling	An exciting wrestler to come out of St. Louis.

== See also ==
- List of professional wrestling halls of fame

== Notes ==
- ^{a} – This is the name given to him by his adoptive parents.
