= Dory Funk Jr. =

American wrestler & trainer (1941–2026)

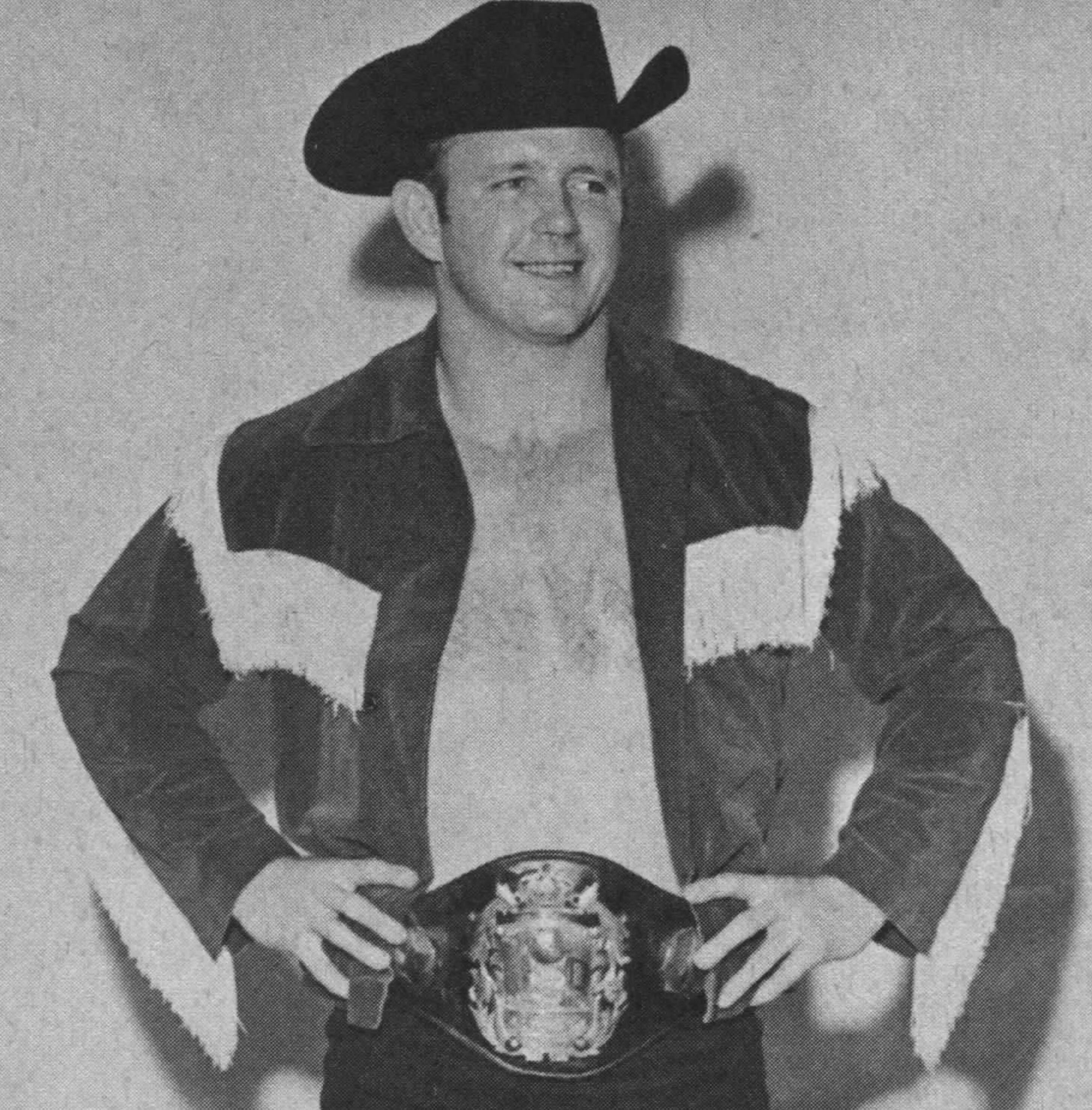
- Funk as NWA World Heavyweight Champion in 1973

Personal information
- Born: Dorrance Earnest Funk; February 3, 1941 Hammond, Indiana, U.S.
- Died: August 4, 2026 (aged 85) Ocala, Florida, U.S.
- Spouses: Jimmie Funk (m. 1960; div. 1983); Marti Funk (m. 1989)
- Children: 5
- Family: Dory Funk (father); Terry Funk (brother)

Professional wrestling career
- Ring name(s): Dory Funk Jr. Hoss Funk; The Long Tall Texan; The Masked Outlaw
- Billed height: 6 ft 2 in (1.88 m)
- Billed weight: 240 lb (109 kg)
- Billed from: The Double Cross Ranch
- Trained by: Dory Funk; Ricky Romero; Pedro Morales
- Debut: 1963
- Retired: August 24, 2024

Dorrance Earnest Funk (February 3, 1941 – August 4, 2026), known professionally as Dory Funk Jr., was an American professional wrestler, promoter, booker, and wrestling trainer. The son of Dory Funk (Dorrance Wilhelm Funk) and brother of Terry Funk, he was the promoter of the Amarillo, Texas-based Western States Sports promotion. He held the NWA World Heavyweight Championship for 1,563 days, from February 11, 1969, to May 24, 1973, the second-longest uninterrupted reign in the title's history behind Lou Thesz. Funk and his brother Terry are the only siblings to have each held the NWA World Heavyweight Championship. Wrestling journalist and historian Dave Meltzer described Funk as "the consensus pick as the best pro wrestler in the world in the early 1970s" and called him "probably the closest thing to a perfect world champion for his time".

Funk held the WWC Universal Heavyweight Championship once and the CWA World Heavyweight Championship once. He also worked as a booker, notably helping to shape Jim Crockett Promotions' 1983 schedule, including the inaugural Starrcade, and served for years as a foreign talent booker for All Japan Pro Wrestling, where he held the Pacific Wrestling Federation (PWF) chairmanship. He ran the Funking Conservatory, a professional wrestling school in Ocala, Florida, that trained a number of future WWE stars. He is a 2009 WWE Hall of Fame inductee, and is also enshrined in the Wrestling Observer Newsletter Hall of Fame (inaugural class, 1996), the St. Louis Wrestling Hall of Fame (2008), the Stampede Wrestling Hall of Fame (1995), the NWA Hall of Fame (2006), the International Pro Wrestling Hall of Fame (2022), and the George Tragos/Lou Thesz Professional Wrestling Hall of Fame (2011), and received the Cauliflower Alley Club's Lou Thesz Award in 2019.

Funk died on August 4, 2026, at his home in Ocala, Florida, while in hospice care, at the age of 85.

== Early life ==
Dorrance Earnest Funk Jr. was born on February 3, 1941, in Hammond, Indiana, the elder of two sons of Dory Funk Sr. and Dorothy Funk. Despite the family's close association with Amarillo, both Dory Jr. and Terry were born and raised in Indiana, where their father, the son of a police chief in Hammond, had served in the Navy before entering professional wrestling. The family relocated to Texas after Karl "Doc" Sarpolis bought the Amarillo promotion from Dory Detton and recruited Dory Sr. away from Indiana with the incentive of a minority stake in the territory. When Sarpolis died of a heart attack in 1967, Dory Sr. bought out the remaining shares and ran Amarillo as Western States Sports.

Funk attended Canyon High School, where he played football and basketball and was, in his own words and those of contemporaries, something of a "Mr. Personality" and student body leader despite being the son of the area's most prominent wrestler and promoter. He went on to West Texas State University (now West Texas A&M University), one of a long line of future wrestlers to attend the school, a list that would go on to include Terry Funk, Dusty Rhodes, Bobby Duncum, Tito Santana, Bruiser Brody, Tully Blanchard, Ted DiBiase and Stan Hansen. Playing offensive and defensive line, Funk was part of the 1962 team, under coach Joe Kerbel, that defeated Ohio University 15–14 in the Sun Bowl in El Paso, Texas. He was inducted into West Texas A&M's athletics Hall of Fame in 1990.

== Professional wrestling career ==
=== Early career and the Amarillo territory (1963–1968) ===
Just ten days after the Sun Bowl victory, Funk made his professional wrestling debut on January 10, 1963, at the Amarillo Sports Arena, defeating Jack Dalton (Don Kalt) in eleven minutes in a show billed as a major local event, with the West Texas State football team and a local high school wrestling squad in attendance to support him. He was immediately pushed into matches with established names such as Wahoo McDaniel, Killer Karl Kox, Iron Mike DiBiase and Moose Cholak, and within three months of his debut he won the Amarillo version of the world heavyweight title from Gene Kiniski. He went on to record notable matches and draws against Verne Gagne, Lou Thesz, Harley Race, Fritz Von Erich and Dick the Bruiser during his rookie year, before suffering his first loss, to The Sheik, in Amarillo that October. The rapid push led to accusations of nepotism given his father's ownership of the territory, criticism that would follow him for years.

In 1965, Funk wrestled his first matches in Australia, for Jim Barnett and Johnny Doyle's World Championship Wrestling promotion, and in St. Louis, a promotion whose approval from promoter Sam Muchnick was widely regarded as a rite of passage toward world title consideration. He later called the Australian territory "the most first-class territory I ever worked". That December, his younger brother Terry made his own wrestling debut, and the pair first teamed together the same month, beginning a partnership that would become one of the most enduring in the sport's history. The brothers wrestled each other in singles competition only three times over their careers.

=== NWA World Heavyweight Champion (1969–1973) ===
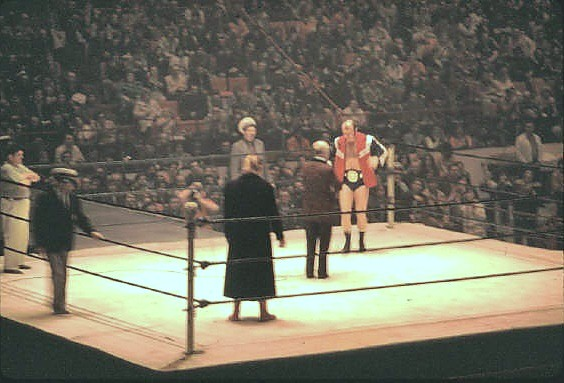
Ring introductions as Funk (background, facing camera) prepares to defend the NWA World Heavyweight Championship

After Gene Kiniski, champion since 1966, told NWA promoters he wished to relinquish the title, three wrestlers were put forward as possible successors: Bill Watts, Hiro Matsuda, and Funk, who was nominated by his father. According to Meltzer, Muchnick championed Funk on the grounds that he was a credible, well-spoken athlete who would represent the title well, and whose relative youth against more experienced or bigger-named opponents gave fans a believable sense that a challenger could beat him on any given night. Not every promoter agreed; Houston promoter Paul Boesch reportedly saw the choice as nepotism and initially refused to book Funk as champion.

Funk defeated Kiniski for the NWA World Heavyweight Championship on February 11, 1969, at the Fort Homer Hesterly Armory in Tampa, Florida, in front of roughly 7,000 fans, using the spinning toe hold that his father had popularized in Texas. He held the title for 1,563 consecutive days, the second-longest uninterrupted reign in NWA history after Lou Thesz. Dory and Terry Funk remain the only brothers to each have held the NWA World Heavyweight Championship.

As champion, Funk took the title on an arduous year-round tour of NWA territories across North America and Japan, wrestling contenders including The Sheik, Johnny Valentine, Jack Brisco, Archie Gouldie, Ernie Ladd, Antonio Inoki and Giant Baba. He set a Texas attendance and gate record on June 24, 1972, defending the title against Fritz Von Erich in front of 26,339 fans at Texas Stadium, a mark that stood until 1984. He also teamed with brother Terry to hold both the United States and NWA tag team titles during a feud with Jack and Jerry Brisco.

==== Rivalry with Jack Brisco ====
Funk's central rivalry as champion was with Jack Brisco, the 1965 NCAA champion at 191 pounds, whom he first faced on record on April 10, 1966, in Albuquerque, New Mexico. Their series of matches, many of which ended in draws, became one of professional wrestling's defining feuds of the era, most notably in St. Louis, where their January 1, 1971, encounter drew a sold-out 11,587 fans to the Kiel Auditorium with thousands more turned away. The two also met at the Toronto promotion and elsewhere through the 1970s and early 1980s, including a bout for the title on October 17, 1982, which Funk won by retaining the championship.

By 1973, plans called for Funk to lose the title to Brisco on March 2 in Houston, but Funk suffered a shoulder injury after falling from a vehicle on his ranch in Umbarger, Texas, just days beforehand, and the match was called off, with Fritz Von Erich substituted on the card. The circumstances of the injury became a point of long-running controversy in wrestling circles, with some suspecting the timing was used to avoid a loss to Brisco, though most later accounts, including Meltzer's, accept that the injury was genuine. Funk returned to the ring weeks later and dropped the championship not to Brisco but to Harley Race, in Kansas City, Missouri, on May 24, 1973; Race then lost the title to Brisco on July 20, 1973, in Houston, completing the transition. Funk and Brisco continued to wrestle one another regularly into the late 1970s, in venues including St. Louis, Florida, Georgia and the Carolinas, with their final one-on-one match believed to have taken place on March 20, 1983, in Asheville, North Carolina.

Just days after Funk lost the NWA title, his father, Dory Funk Sr., died of a heart attack at age 54 on June 3, 1973, after informally wrestling with Les Thornton at a family barbecue. The sudden death thrust Dory Jr. and Terry into control of the Amarillo territory, which they continued to run until selling it in 1978.

=== All Japan Pro Wrestling and the NWA International title (1969–1996) ===
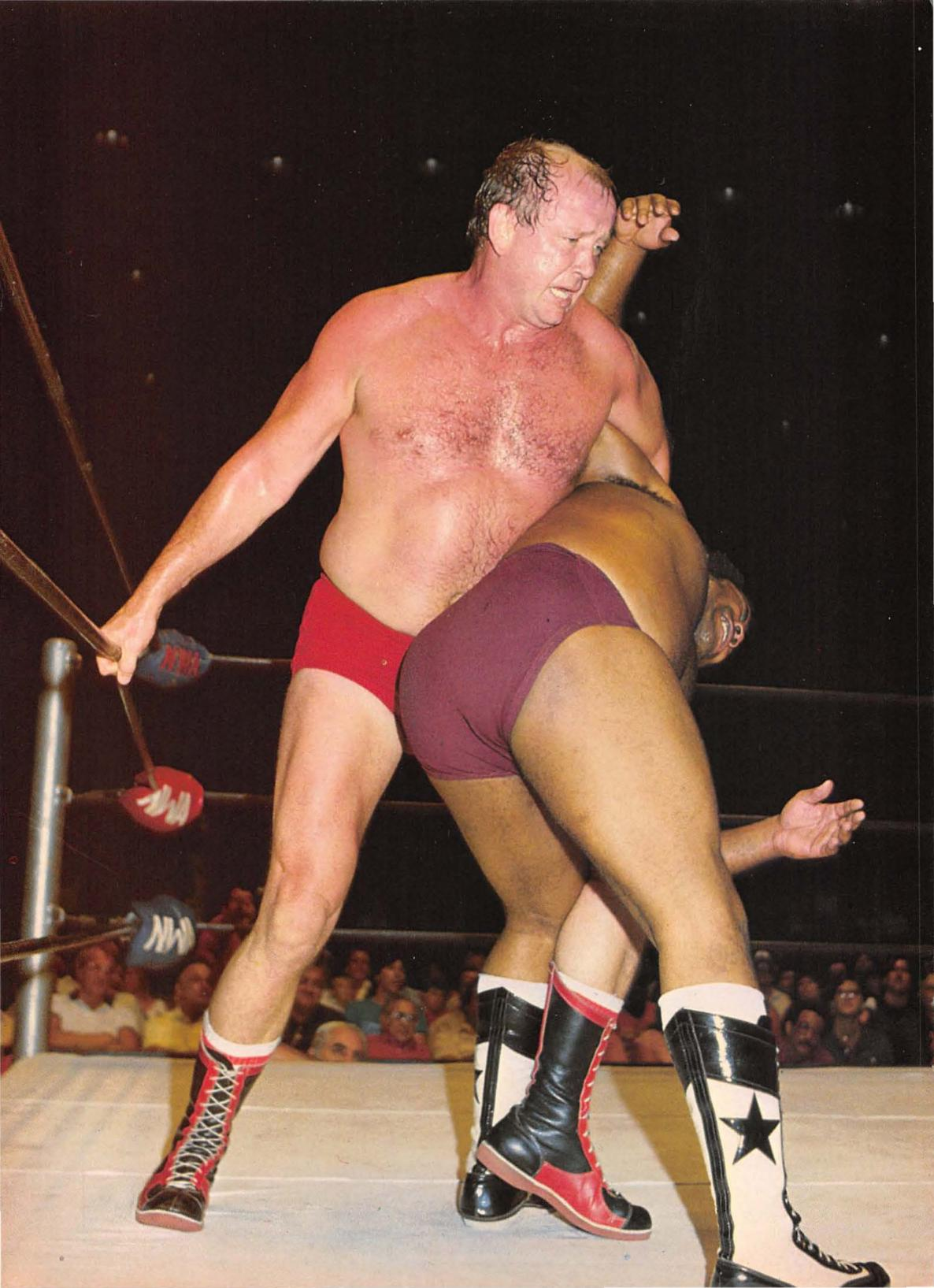
Dory Funk Jr. in 1985

Funk first toured Japan as NWA champion in late 1969, wrestling Giant Baba and Antonio Inoki to consecutive sixty-minute draws. Funk's December 2, 1969, match with Inoki in particular was regarded as one of the best matches in the country up to that point and helped establish both the NWA title and Inoki's reputation with Japanese audiences. Following the death of his father in 1973, Dory Jr. and Terry took over as foreign talent bookers for Baba's newly formed All Japan Pro Wrestling, a role that had opened up after Antonio Inoki was ousted from the JWA amid allegations, reported by John Pollock, that he had plotted to "shoot on" Funk during a planned NWA title match to seize the championship for himself. Baba subsequently left the JWA to found All Japan, while Inoki launched the rival New Japan Pro-Wrestling; the Funks' NWA ties gave Baba's promotion a significant advantage in accessing top American talent.

In All Japan, Funk feuded with Baba, The Destroyer, Jumbo Tsuruta, Abdullah the Butcher, The Sheik, Genichiro Tenryu and Harley Race, and he and Terry worked frequently as a tag team against Abdullah and The Sheik, and against Baba and Tsuruta. Together, Dory and Terry won the World's Strongest Tag Determination League, later known as the Real World Tag League, in 1977, 1979, and 1982. Amarillo also became a training ground for future All Japan stars sent by Baba, including Jumbo Tsuruta and Genichiro Tenryu; Funk later recalled Tsuruta as the fastest learner he ever trained. On December 11, 1980, the Funks won the Match of the Year Award from Tokyo Sports for their bout against Baba and Tsuruta.

Funk's biggest individual achievement in All Japan was winning the NWA International Heavyweight Championship three times between 1981 and 1982, first defeating Terry in a tournament final on April 30, 1981, before trading the title with Butch Reed and Bruiser Brody over the following year. He later feuded with Brody, Stan Hansen and Tiger Jeet Singh. When Abdullah the Butcher jumped to New Japan in May 1981, the Funks helped persuade Stan Hansen to leave New Japan for All Japan, reportedly for around $8,000 a week, roughly double his previous salary; Hansen made a surprise appearance at that year's Real World Tag League final. Funk returned to All Japan repeatedly over the following decades, including a run from 1990 to 1996 in which he teamed with Al Perez, Andre the Giant and Giant Baba among others, before further guest appearances in 2008, 2013–2017 and later tribute shows.

=== Booking career and Jim Crockett Promotions (1983) ===
Alongside his in-ring career, Funk worked as a booker for several promotions. When Ole Anderson found himself booking both Georgia Championship Wrestling and Jim Crockett Promotions' Mid-Atlantic territory in the early 1980s, Funk was brought in to help book Mid-Atlantic during a pivotal 1983, assigning cities within the territory to bookers including Gary Hart, Wahoo McDaniel and Ernie Ladd. That year's promotional calendar included Ricky Steamboat and Jay Youngblood's NWA World Tag Team title win over Sgt. Slaughter and Don Kernodle in a steel cage match, and the first world title change in Carolinas history when Ric Flair defeated Harley Race for the NWA World Heavyweight Championship in the main event of the inaugural Starrcade. Funk was not in attendance at Starrcade itself, being committed to All Japan's Real World Tag League at the time, and Dusty Rhodes subsequently took over as Mid-Atlantic's booker and is credited with naming the Starrcade event.

=== World Wrestling Federation (1986) ===
In 1986, renamed "Hoss Funk", Dory joined the World Wrestling Federation alongside his brother Terry. The pair defeated Junkyard Dog and Tito Santana, managed by Jimmy Hart, at WrestleMania 2. A month later, they wrestled Hulk Hogan and Junkyard Dog on the sixth Saturday Night's Main Event, a match that drew a 9.3 rating on NBC. Terry left the promotion shortly after WrestleMania, while Dory remained for a period, tagging with "Jimmy Jack Funk" (Jesse Barr), who had no actual family relation. His WWF tenure lasted roughly six months; he later said the promotion's road schedule was not suited to him. Funk wrestled his last WWF match, a loss to Pedro Morales, at the Sam Muchnick Memorial Tournament on August 29, 1986.

=== World Wrestling Council and later territories (1987–1989) ===
On September 20, 1987, Funk and Terry lost to The Road Warriors by disqualification at the World Wrestling Council's 14th Anniversary show in Bayamón, Puerto Rico. He returned to the WWC the following February for the La Copa Gillette tournament, beating Bruiser Brody in the first round before losing to Carlos Colón in the quarterfinals. He also made appearances for the Continental Wrestling Association in Memphis in 1988 and, reunited with Terry, for the World Wrestling Alliance in Kansas City in 1989.

=== Eastern/Extreme Championship Wrestling (1994, 1997) ===
In 1994 Funk made his debut for Eastern Championship Wrestling (soon to be renamed Extreme Championship Wrestling), reuniting for the first time in three years with Terry, who was one of the promotion's main stars. They feuded with The Public Enemy during Dory's stay in ECW. On June 26 they teamed up with Tommy Dreamer to defeat Hack Meyers and Public Enemy on ECW Hardcore TV. They lost to Public Enemy at Heatwave '94: the Battle for the Future in a No Rope Barbed Wire match.

On September 11, 1997, Dory took part in Terry Funk Presents WrestleFest: 50 Years of Funk event. Terry was planning to retire from wrestling for the first time. That night, Dory defeated Rob Van Dam. Later that month, on September 27, 1997, Funk lost a title match to ECW World Heavyweight Champion Shane Douglas.

=== Later career, training, and sporadic returns (1990–2024) ===
Funk continued to tour All Japan through the 1990s with a rotating cast of tag team partners, and made a series of one-off appearances elsewhere, including a time-limit draw with Nick Bockwinkel at WCW's Slamboree in 1993, matches in Eastern/Extreme Championship Wrestling in 1994 and 1997 alongside Terry, and a cameo in the 1996 WWF Royal Rumble.

From the mid-1990s, Funk became closely associated with training talent for the WWF's Attitude Era through what became known as the "Funkin' Dojo", operated with fellow trainer Tom Prichard. Prospects were required to receive Funk's approval before graduating to WWF television. His students included Jeff Hardy, Matt Hardy, Christian Cage, Lita, Kurt Angle, Mickie James, Adam Copeland, Ted DiBiase, Mark Henry, Test, Val Venis and Rikishi. Kurt Angle later said Funk "taught me the basics of pro wrestling, and there was no one better than him", recalling that Funk prepared him for his first matches in five days.

Based in Ocala, Florida, Funk continued to run the Funking Conservatory and, with his wife Marti, the BANG TV promotion, while touring Japan annually until 2017 and continuing to wrestle occasional matches into his eighties. In October 2001, he and Terry teamed for New Japan Pro-Wrestling, including a Tokyo Dome tag match against Tatsumi Fujinami and Bob Backlund, one of the few promotions in which the brothers had not previously appeared together. Terry Funk died in August 2023 at age 79. The following year, at a tribute show for his brother, Dory, then 83, came out of retirement to team with protégé Osamu Nishimura against Atsushi Onita and Raijin Yaguchi in a Double Hell Current Explosion Death match in Kawasaki, which they won in just over thirteen minutes; this proved to be his final match.

== Wrestling style ==
Funk wrestled a technical, hard-nosed West Texas style built around precise mat wrestling and relentless pressure rather than showmanship. He is credited by some outlets with popularizing the Texas Cloverleaf submission hold, and used the spinning toe hold, a signature move of his father's, as his primary finisher for much of his career.

== Personal life and death ==
Dorrance Earnest Funk was born in Hammond, Indiana on February 3, 1941.

Funk married his first wife, Jimmie, on June 8, 1960. Together, they had three children: Dory III, Adam Dirk, and Penny, and five grandchildren. Dory III went on to practice medicine in Colorado, and Funk's grandson Dory IV trained as a wrestler under him. The couple later separated and divorced on July 6, 1983. In 1980, Funk met his second wife, Marti; the couple married in 1989 and had two children together.

Funk coached at the Funking Conservatory Professional Wrestling School in Ocala, Florida, teaching what he called the Dory Funk Method of Professional Wrestling; a branch affiliated with the World Wrestling Federation was known as the "Funkin' Dojo". His wife Marti ran BANG TV, which featured many of Funk's matches.

On August 4, 2026, Funk died at home in Ocala, Florida, while in hospice care, at the age of 85; the cause of death was not disclosed. His death was first reported publicly by former wrestler B. Brian Blair on social media, and was confirmed by his wife, Marti, to the Ocala Gazette. "He was such a good guy, such a good guy!" Marti told the paper. Meltzer reported that Funk had been in declining health and had entered hospice care before his death, a fact that had "been kept largely quiet".

=== Tributes ===
WWE issued a statement calling Funk "a member of the legendary Funk wrestling dynasty" and saying "they didn't come much tougher or more respected". WWE chief content officer Paul "Triple H" Levesque wrote that Funk's "travels across North America and Asia were a part of the early blueprint that helped build this business into a global phenomena". The National Wrestling Alliance said Dory and Terry Funk "remain the only brothers to each claim the NWA Worlds Heavyweight Title" and called Funk "a true legend whose contributions to professional wrestling are still felt and celebrated to this day". Ric Flair wrote that anyone who did not get to wrestle a Funk "missed the opportunity of a lifetime", while Matt Hardy and fellow trainee Kurt Angle both credited Funk as a formative influence on their careers. Wrestler Natalie Neidhart said her grandfather, promoter Stu Hart, regarded Funk as his favorite Stampede Wrestling champion. Japanese promotions New Japan Pro-Wrestling and All Japan Pro Wrestling also paid tribute to Funk after his death. During a live event, WWE Undisputed Champion CM Punk used Funk's signature toe hold to win a match as a tribute.

== Championships and accomplishments ==
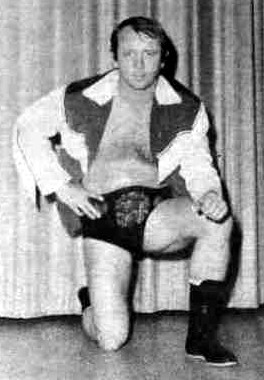
Funk (pictured in 1972) was a one-time NWA World Heavyweight Champion.

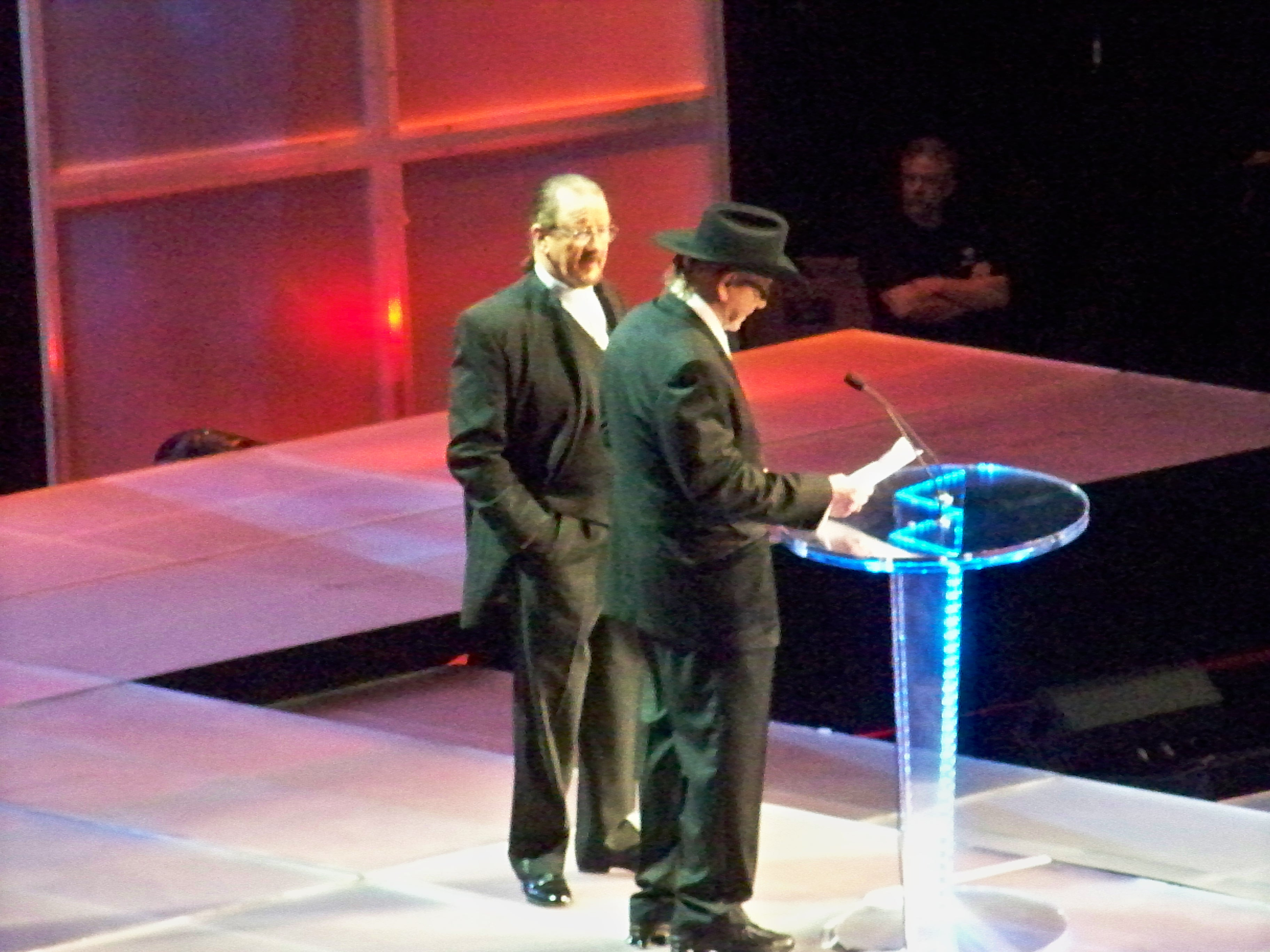
Dory and Terry Funk at the 2009 WWE Hall of Fame induction ceremony

- All Japan Pro Wrestling
  - NWA International Heavyweight Championship (2 times)
  - World's Strongest Tag Determination League (1977, 1979, 1982) – with Terry Funk
  - NWA International Heavyweight Championship Tournament (1981)
  - World's Strongest Tag Determination League Technical Award (1977) – with Terry Funk
  - World's Strongest Tag Determination League Teamplay Award (1980) – with Terry Funk
  - World's Strongest Tag Determination League Distinguished Service Medal Award (1984) – with Terry Funk
  - World's Strongest Tag Determination League Skill Award (1985) – with Giant Baba
  - World's Strongest Tag Determination League Technique Award (1986, 1987) – with Terry Funk
  - World's Strongest Tag Determination League Excellent Team Award (1990) – with Terry Funk
  - World's Strongest Tag Determination League Teamwork Award (1991) – with Al Perez
- Cauliflower Alley Club
  - Lou Thesz Award (2019)
  - Other honoree (1998)
- Championship Wrestling from Florida
  - NWA Florida Heavyweight Championship (4 times)
  - NWA Florida Tag Team Championship (1 time) – with Terry Funk
  - NWA Florida Television Championship (2 times)
  - NWA International Heavyweight Championship (1 time)
  - NWA North American Tag Team Championship (Florida version) (2 times) – with Terry Funk (1) and David Von Erich (1)
- Continental Wrestling Association
  - CWA World Heavyweight Championship (1 time, final)
- George Tragos/Lou Thesz Professional Wrestling Hall of Fame
  - Class of 2011
- Georgia Championship Wrestling
  - NWA Georgia Tag Team Championship (1 time) – with Terry Funk
  - NWA Georgia Tag Team Championship Tournament (1978) – with Terry Funk
- International Championship Wrestling
  - ICW Heavyweight Championship (1 time)
- International Professional Wrestling Hall of Fame
  - Class of 2022
- Mid-Atlantic Championship Wrestling
  - NWA Mid-Atlantic Heavyweight Championship (2 times)
- National Wrestling Alliance
  - NWA Hall of Fame (Class of 2006)
  - NWA World Heavyweight Championship (1 time)
- NWA Hollywood Wrestling
  - NWA Americas Heavyweight Championship (1 time)
  - NWA International Tag Team Championship (3 times) – with Terry Funk
  - NWA World Tag Team Championship (Los Angeles Version) (1 time) – with Terry Funk
- New England Wrestling Alliance
  - NEWA North American Heavyweight Championship (1 time)
- Pro Wrestling Illustrated
  - PWI Match of the Year (1973) vs. Harley Race on May 24
  - PWI Match of the Year (1974) vs. Jack Brisco on January 27
  - Stanley Weston Award (2014)
  - PWI ranked him #147 of the top 500 singles wrestlers in the PWI 500 in 1994
  - PWI ranked him #149 of the top 500 singles wrestlers of the "PWI Years" in 2003
  - PWI ranked him #9 of the top 100 tag teams of the "PWI Years" with Terry Funk in 2003
- Professional Wrestling Hall of Fame and Museum
  - Class of 2005
- Pro Wrestling Illustrated
  - Stanley Weston Achievement Award
- Southwest Championship Wrestling
  - SCW Southwest Heavyweight Championship (1 time)
  - SCW World Tag Team Championship (1 time) – with Terry Funk
- St. Louis Wrestling Hall of Fame
  - Class of 2008
- St. Louis Wrestling Club
  - NWA Missouri Heavyweight Championship (1 time)
- Stampede Wrestling
  - NWA International Tag Team Championship (Calgary version) (1 time) – with Larry Lane
  - Stampede Wrestling Hall of Fame (Class of 1995)
- Tokyo Sports
  - Match of the Year Award (1980) with Terry Funk vs. Giant Baba and Jumbo Tsuruta on December 11
- Western States Sports
  - NWA Brass Knuckles Championship (Amarillo version) (2 times)
  - NWA International Tag Team Championship (2 times) – with Terry Funk
  - NWA North American Heavyweight Championship (Amarillo version) (1 time)
  - NWA Western States Tag Team Championship (6 times) – with Ricky Romero (2), The Super Destroyer (2), Ray Candy (1), and Larry Lane (1)
  - NWA World Tag Team Championship (2 times) – with Terry Funk
  - NWA World Tag Team Championship (Amarillo version) (3 times) – with Terry Funk
- World Wrestling Council
  - WWC Puerto Rico Heavyweight Championship (1 time)
  - WWC Universal Heavyweight Championship (1 time)
  - WWC World Tag Team Championship (1 time) – with Terry Funk
- World Wrestling Entertainment
  - WWE Hall of Fame (Class of 2009) – with Terry Funk
- Wrestling Observer Newsletter
  - Wrestling Observer Newsletter Hall of Fame (Class of 1996)
- Other titles
  - New York Heavyweight Championship (1 time)
