= George Tragos/Lou Thesz Professional Wrestling Hall of Fame =

Professional wrestling hall of fame

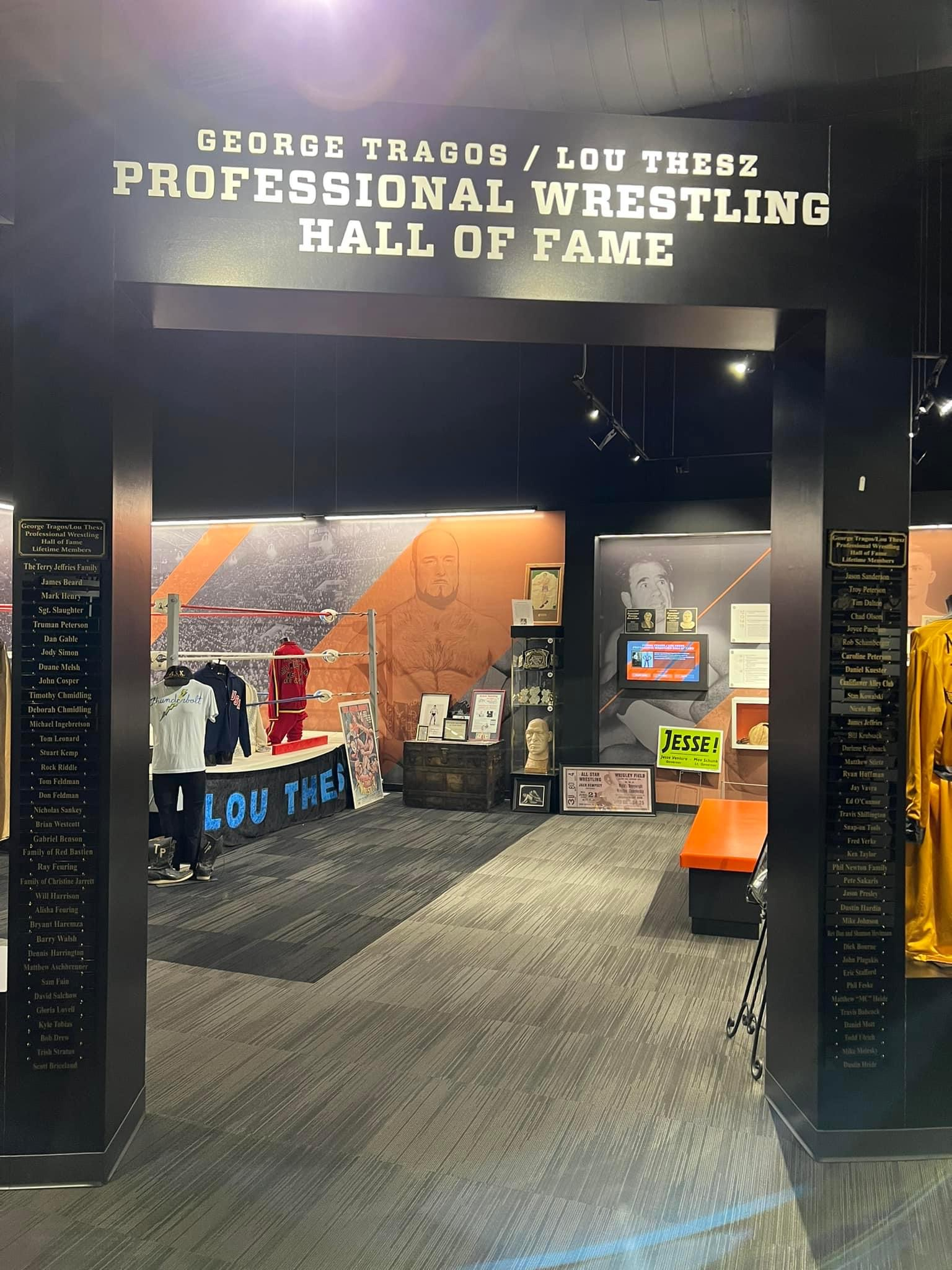
- TNTHOF housed inside of the Dan Gable Museum
- Established: 1999
- Location: Waterloo, Iowa, U.S.
- Director: Jim Miller
- Public transit access: 6 7 MET Transit
- Website: api.nwhof.org

The George Tragos/Lou Thesz Professional Wrestling Hall of Fame (TNTHOF) is a professional wrestling hall of fame and museum located within the National Wrestling Hall of Fame's Dan Gable Museum. The hall of fame is named after Lou Thesz, who helped create it, and his trainer George Tragos. Inductees are professional wrestlers with a strong amateur wrestling or shootfighting background who have made an impact on professional wrestling. Additionally, it issues several more awards to recognize individuals who have influenced the industry in various capacities.

The hall of fame was founded in 1999 in Newton, Iowa, but moved to Waterloo, Iowa in 2007. The museum suffered severe flooding in the Iowa flood of 2008, but reopened in June 2009. Wrestling historian and journalist Mike Chapman served as executive director of the museum until Kyle Klingman succeeded him in November 2009. On July 1, 2019, Jim Miller began work as director of the Hall of Fame succeeding Kyle Klingman.

Inductions take place at a hall of fame induction ceremony. Other activities are held throughout the weekend in conjunction with the event, such as local independent promotion Impact Pro Wrestling's Hall of Fame Classic tournament in 2017 and 2018.

== Honorees ==
=== Inductees ===
Year	Image	Ring name (Birth name)	Notes
1999		Lou Thesz (Aloysius Thesz)	One-time holder of the AWA World Heavyweight Championship (Boston version), two-time World Heavyweight Wrestling Champion, three-time NWA World Heavyweight Champion
1999		Ed "Strangler" Lewis (Robert Friedrich)	Posthumous inductee: Four-time World Heavyweight Champion, two-time holder of the AWA World Heavyweight Championship (Boston version) and one-time NWA Florida Heavyweight Champion
1999		Frank Gotch	Posthumous inductee: One-time World Heavyweight Wrestling Champion and three-time American Heavyweight Champion
1999		George Tragos	Posthumous inductee: Won many amateur titles in Greece and competed for two Olympic teams there, trained Lou Thesz.
1999		Verne Gagne	Two-time NCAA champion, member of the U.S. wrestling team at the 1948 Summer Olympics. Co-founder of the American Wrestling Association, 10-time AWA World Heavyweight Champion
2000		Dick Hutton	Three-time NCAA champion, one-time NWA World Heavyweight Champion
2000		Danny Hodge	Seven-time NWA World Junior Heavyweight Champion, three-time NCAA champion, Olympic silver medalist
2000		Joe Stecher	Posthumous inductee: Three-time World Heavyweight Wrestling Championship (original version)
2000		Earl Caddock	Posthumous inductee: One-time World Heavyweight Wrestling Championship (original version)
2001		William Muldoon	Posthumous inductee: First chairman of the New York State Athletic Commission, one-time World Greco-Roman Heavyweight Champion
2001		Martin "Farmer" Burns	Posthumous inductee: One-time American Heavyweight Champion
2001		Jack Brisco	Two-time NWA World Heavyweight Champion, three-time NWA World Tag Team Champion, NCAA champion
2001		Tim Woods (George Woodin)	Won two Big Ten Conference Championships in 1958 and 1959. Two-time NWA Florida Heavyweight Champion and one-time NWA Texas Heavyweight Champion
2002		Dick "The Destroyer" Beyer	Three-time WWA World Heavyweight Champion and one-time AWA World Heavyweight Champion
2002		Bob Geigel	Three-time AWA World Tag Team Champion
2002		Baron von Raschke (James Raschke)	Three time WWA World Heavyweight Champion, one-time NWA American Heavyweight Champion, one-time NWA Brass Knuckles Champion (Texas version), one-time NWA Georgia Heavyweight Champion
2002		Ed Don George	Posthumous inductee: Two-time World Heavyweight Wrestling Champion and one-time AWA World Heavyweight Champion (Boston version)
2002	—N/a	Peter Sauer	Posthumous inductee: One-time NWA/NBA World Heavyweight Champion
2003		Billy Robinson	One-time PWF World Heavyweight Champion, two-time AWA World Tag Team Champion, and three-time AWA British Empire Heavyweight Champion
2003		Maurice "Mad Dog" Vachon	Five-time AWA World Heavyweight Champion
2003	—N/a	Joe Scarpello	Posthumous inductee: Won several amateur titles before wrestling professionally for the American Wrestling Association
2003		George Hackenschmidt (Georg Hackenschmidt)	Posthumous inductee: One-time European Greco-Roman Heavyweight Champion and first ever World Heavyweight Wrestling Champion
2004		Gene Kiniski	Held the AWA World Heavyweight Championship, NWA World Heavyweight Championship, and WWA World Heavyweight Championship once each.
2004		Leroy McGuirk	Posthumous inductee: Three-time NWA World Light Heavyweight Champion, one-time NWA World Junior Heavyweight Champion, one-time NWA World Junior Heavyweight Champion.
2004		Pat O'Connor	Posthumous inductee: One-time NWA World Heavyweight Champion, three-time NWA Central States United States Heavyweight Champion, One-time (and inaugural) AWA World Heavyweight Champion, and one-time AWA World Tag Team Champion.
2004		Brad Rheingans	Member of the U.S. 1976 and 1980 Summer Olympic teams, won two gold medals in the 1975 and 1979 Pan American Games and a bronze medal in the 1979 World Wrestling Championships. Later wrestled professionally for NJPW, WWF, WCW, and AWA
2005		Antonio Inoki	Founder of New Japan Pro-Wrestling, two-time WWWF/WWF World Martial Arts Heavyweight Champion, and one-time IWGP Heavyweight Champion
2005		Harley Race	Eight-time NWA World Heavyweight Champion, one-time and first NWA United States Heavyweight Champion, three-time AWA World Tag Team Champion and WWF King of the Ring winner in 1986
2005		Gerald Brisco	Three-time NWA World Tag Team Champion, one-time NWA World Junior Heavyweight Champion
2005		Earl McCready	Posthumous inductee: Competed for Canada in the 1928 Summer Olympics before becoming a professional wrestler
2005	—N/a	Dr. Bill Miller	Posthumous inductee: One-time AWA World Heavyweight Champion
2005	—N/a	John Pesek	Posthumous inductee: One-time NWA World Heavyweight Champion, one-time MWA World Heavyweight Champion
2006		Bret "Hitman" Hart	Five-time WWF World Heavyweight Champion, two-time WCW World Heavyweight Champion, was a Triple Crown winner in WWF and WCW.
2006		Larry "The Axe" Hennig	Four-time AWA World Tag Team Champion, one-time IWA World Tag Team Champion
2006	—N/a	Bob Roop	1967 NCCA Champion. Four-time NWA Florida Heavyweight Champion
2006		Dory Funk	Posthumous inductee: Won the NWA World Junior Heavyweight Championship and various NWA regional titles.
2006	—N/a	"Iron" Mike DiBiase	Posthumous inductee: One-time NWA World Junior Heavyweight Champion.
2006		Tom Jenkins	Posthumous inductee: Three-time American Heavyweight Champion
2007		Red Bastien (Roland Bastien)	One-time NWA Texas Tag Team Champion
2007		"Dr. Death" Steve Williams	One-time Triple Crown Heavyweight Champion, one-time UWF World Heavyweight Champion, four-time NCAA All-American
2007		The Great Gama (Ghulam Mohammad Baksh)	Posthumous inductee: Won the Indian version of the World Heavyweight Championship
2007		"Mr. Perfect" Curt Hennig	Posthumous inductee: One-time AWA World Heavyweight Champion, two-time WWF Intercontinental Heavyweight Champion, one-time WCW United States Heavyweight Champion, one-time WCW World Tag Team Champion
2007		Dale Lewis	Posthumous inductee: Wrestled in the 1956 and 1960 Olympics. Later held the NWA Florida Heavyweight Championship once.
2007		"The Million Dollar Man" Ted DiBiase	Four-time Mid-South North American Heavyweight Champion and three-time WWF World Tag Team Champion.
2008		Masa Saito	One-time AWA World Heavyweight Champion, two-time IWGP Tag Team Champion
2008		Abe Jacobs	Won several regional championships
2008	—N/a	Stu Hart	Posthumous inductee: Established Stampede Wrestling in Calgary 1948, and ran it until 1984. Ran "The Dungeon" wrestling school and trained numerous wrestlers. Patriarch of the Hart family
2008		"Rowdy" Roddy Piper (Roderick Toombs)	One-time WWF Intercontinental Heavyweight Champion and three-time NWA/WCW United States Heavyweight Champion
2008	—N/a	Ray Gunkel	Posthumous inductee: One-time NWA Georgia Heavyweight Champion and three-time NWA Texas Heavyweight Champion
2008	—N/a	Leo Nomellini	Posthumous inductee: One-time AWA World Tag Team Champion
2009		Nick Bockwinkel	Four-time AWA World Heavyweight Champion and three-time AWA World Tag Team Champion
2009	—N/a	Karl Gotch (Karl Istaz)	Posthumous inductee: Won the IWA World Heavyweight Championship and WWWF World Tag Team Championship once each
2009	—N/a	Luther Lindsay	Posthumous inductee: Won the NWA Hawaii Heavyweight Championship, NWA Pacific Northwest Heavyweight Championship, and the NWA Canadian Heavyweight Championship (Calgary version) once each
2009		Bronko Nagurski	Posthumous inductee: Two-time NWA/NBA World Heavyweight Championship, one-time New York State Athletic Commission World Heavyweight Champion
2009		Ricky "The Dragon" Steamboat (Richard Blood)	One-time NWA World Heavyweight Champion, three-time NWA United States Heavyweight Champion, and one-time WWF Intercontinental Heavyweight Champion
2009		Fritz Von Goering (John Gabor)	One-time NWA Pacific Northwest Heavyweight Champion
2010		Stanislaus Zbyszko (Jan Stanisław Cyganiewicz)	Posthumous inductee: Two-time World Heavyweight Wrestling Champion
2010	—N/a	Warren Bockwinkel	Had high-profile feuds in the National Wrestling Alliance
2010	—N/a	George Gordienko	Posthumous inductee: One-time NWA Pacific Coast Heavyweight Champion (Vancouver version), one-time British Commonwealth Heavyweight Champion (New Zealand version), three-time NWA Canadian Heavyweight Champion (Calgary version).
2010		Paul "Butcher" Vachon	Two-time AWA World Tag Team Champion and three-time NWA International Tag Team Champion (Calgary version)
2010		Terry Funk	One-time NWA World Heavyweight Champion, two-time ECW World Heavyweight Champion and one-time WWF Tag Team Champion
2011		Dory Funk Jr.	One-time NWA World Heavyweight Champion
2011		Gorilla Monsoon (Robert "Gino" Marella)	Posthumous inductee: One-time IWA World Heavyweight Champion, and two-time WWC North American Heavyweight Champion
2012	—N/a	Don "The Buffalo Bomber" Curtis	Posthumous inductee: Won various NWA tag team championships
2012		Kurt Angle	Named the greatest shoot wrestler by USA Wrestling; won the freestyle wrestling gold medal at the 1996 Summer Olympics. Four-time WWF/WWE Champion, one-time World Heavyweight Champion (WWE), one-time WCW Champion, one-time IWGP Heavyweight Champion (IGF), six-time TNA World Heavyweight Champion
2013		Chris Taylor	Posthumous inductee: Bronze winner in freestyle wrestling at the 1972 Summer Olympics, becoming the heaviest Olympian ever at that point. Later wrestled for the American Wrestling Association
2013		"Nature Boy" Ric Flair (Richard Fliehr)	Two-time WWF World Heavyweight Champion, inaugural and six-time WCW World Heavyweight Champion, and eight-time NWA World Heavyweight Champion
2013		"Cowboy" Bill Watts	Former wrestling promoter in the mid-south United States, one-time WWWF United States Tag Team Champion and held over 20 NWA regional championships
2014		Scott Steiner (Scott Rechsteiner)	One-time WCW World Heavyweight Champion, two-time WCW United States Heavyweight Champion, two-time WWF Tag Team Champion, two-time TNA Tag Team Champion, two-time IWGP Tag Team Champion and seven-time NWA (Mid-Atlantic version)/WCW Tag Team Champion
2014		Rick Steiner (Robert Rechsteiner)	One-time WCW United States Heavyweight Champion, two-time WWF Tag Team Champion, two-time IWGP Tag Team Champion and eight-time NWA (Mid-Atlantic version)/WCW Tag Team Champion
2014		Wilbur Snyder	Posthumous inductee: Two-time World Heavyweight Champion (Omaha version), two-time AWA World Tag Team Champion
2015	—N/a	The Great Wojo (Gregory Wojciechowski)	Three-time WWA World Heavyweight Champion (Indianapolis version)
2015		Jim Londos (Christos Theofilou)	Posthumous inductee: One-time World Heavyweight Wrestling Champion
2016		Bob Backlund	Two-time WWWF/WWF (World) Heavyweight Champion and one-time WWF Tag Team Champion
2016		The Iron Sheik (Khosrow Vaziri)	1971 Amateur Athletic Union Greco-Roman wrestling champion and gold medalist. One-time WWF World Heavyweight Champion and one-time WWF Tag Team Champion
2016	—N/a	Joe Blanchard	Posthumous inductee: One-time NWA Texas Heavyweight Champion. Later founded Southwest Championship Wrestling and served as a figurehead in the American Wrestling Association
2017		"Mr. Wonderful" Paul Orndorff	One-time Memphis Wrestling Southern Heavyweight Champion, three-time NWA (Mid-Atlantic)/WCW World Tag Team Champion, one-time WCW World Television Champion
2017		"The American Dream" Dusty Rhodes (Virgil Runnels Jr.)	Posthumous inductee: Three-time NWA World Heavyweight Champion, ten-time NWA Florida Heavyweight Champion, seven-time NWA Southern Heavyweight Champion (Florida version), one-time NWA United States Heavyweight Champion
2018		Owen Hart	Posthumous inductee: one-time USWA Unified World Heavyweight Champion, two-time WWF Intercontinental Champion, four-time WWF World Tag Team Champion, one-time Stampede British Commonwealth Mid-Heavyweight Champion, one-time IWGP Junior Heavyweight Champion
2018		Dan Severn	First three-time honoree: previously received the Frank Gotch Award in 2002 and the George Tragos Award in 2012. One-time UFC Superfight Champion and UFC Hall of Famer. Two-time NWA World Heavyweight Champion
2019		Beth Phoenix (Elizabeth Kociański)	Second time honored, previously received the Frank Gotch Award in 2015. First woman inducted in the Hall of Fame. One-time WWE Divas Champion, three-time WWE Women's Champion
2019		Bruno Sammartino	Posthumous inductee: two-time WWWF/WWF (World) Heavyweight Champion and one-time WWF Tag Team Champion
2021 (Note: These honorees were originally announced as being part of the 2020 ceremony but the event was postponed until 2021 due to the COVID-19 pandemic.)		Adnan Al-Kaissie	One time WWWF World Tag Team Champion, one time NWA Pacific Northwest Heavyweight Champion and one time IWA World Heavyweight Champion (Australian version).
2021	—N/a	Earl Wampler	Posthumous inductee: An influence on Lou Thesz, Wampler wrestled for 40 years. He held the NWA Iowa Heavyweight Title and was the inaugural holder of the NWA Southern Tag Team Championship (Mid-Atlantic version) with Jack O'Brien.
2021		Don Kernodle	Posthumous inductee:Three-time NWA World Tag Team Champion (Mid-Atlantic version)
2022		Mike Rotunda	One-time NWA World Tag Team Champion, three-time NWA Florida Heavyweight Champion, three-time NWA Television Champion and five-time WWF Tag Team Champion.
2023		Gary Albright	Posthumous inductee: Two-time AJPW World Tag Team Champion and one-time Stampede Wrestling International Tag Team Champion
2024		Greg Gagne	Two-time AWA World Tag Team Champion, two-time AWA International Television Champion
2025		Jake Hager	Wrestled for the University of Oklahoma and later competed in mixed marital arts for Bellator MMA. In WWE, he was a one-time ECW Champion, one-time World Heavyweight Champion (WWE), one-time WWE United States Champion
2026		Nic Nemeth (Nicholas Theodore Nemeth)	Established several amateur wrestling records while competing for Kent State University. In professional wrestling, he is a two-time World Heavyweight Champion(WWE) and one-time TNA World Champion
2027		Charlie Haas	Competed as an amateur wrestler for Seton Hall University. In professional wrestling, he held the WWE Tag Team Championship three-times and the ROH World Tag Team Championship two-times with Shelton Benjamin

=== Frank Gotch Award recipients ===
Named after hall of fame inductee Frank Gotch, this award honors people in professional wrestling who brought positive recognition to the industry through work outside of it.

Year	Image	Ring name (Birth name)	Notes
2000	—N/a	Bobby Managoff	One-time World Heavyweight Championship (National Wrestling Association)
2001	—N/a	Tom Drake	Also inducted into the Professional Wrestling Hall of Fame and Museum
2002		Dan Severn	Later received the George Tragos Award in 2012 and inducted into the hall of fame in 2018
2003		Jesse Ventura (James Janos)	One-time AWA World Tag Team Champion. Former commentator in WWF and WCW. 38th Governor of Minnesota.
2004	—N/a	George Scott	Won several tag team championships with his brother, Sandy. Later served as an executive in WWF and Jim Crockett Promotions
2005	—N/a	Gene LeBell	Martial artist who later promoted NWA Hollywood Wrestling
2006		Nikita Koloff (Nelson Simpson)	One-time NWA National Heavyweight Champion, one-time NWA United States Heavyweight Champion, two-time NWA World Tag Team Champion (Mid-Atlantic Version)
2008	—N/a	Penny Banner (Mary Ann Kostecki)	One-time AWA World Women's Champion, Commissioner of the Professional Girl Wrestling Association (PGWA) from 1992 to 2008
2009		Ivan Koloff (Oreal Donald Perras)	He worked as a Christian Minister and participated on several charities
2010		Mick Foley	Has participated in numerous Make-a-Wish Foundation events, is a member with RAINN (Rape, Incest, Abuse National Network) and is one of the leading donors of Child Fund International.
2011		"Hacksaw" Jim Duggan	A survivor of kidney cancer, has worked with a variety of charities including the Children’s Home Society for underprivileged children, Shiners International, Make-A-Wish, and the Special Olympics. Also, he participated in the Variety Kids Telethon.
2012		Road Warrior Animal (Joe Laurinaitis)	Along with his longtime tag team partner, Road Warrior Hawk, they were two-time WWF Tag Team Champions, one-time AWA World Tag Team Champions, and one-time NWA World Tag Team Champions (Mid-Atlantic)
2013		Jim Brunzell	Two-time AWA World Tag Team Champion
2014		"Diamond" Dallas Page	His DDP yoga series has led to healthier lifestyles.
2015		Beth Phoenix (Elizabeth Kociański)	Worked with numerous causes, including the Eblen Charitable Foundation, Mission Hospital Volunteer Department and the "I Have a Dream" Foundation.
2016		Lex Luger (Lawrence Pfohl)	After suffering a stroke in 2007, which led to temporary paralysis, he was in a quadriplegic state for a month, but was able to stand for short periods of time with his walker. He presented a message of hope.
2017		Stan "The Lariat" Hansen	Four-time Triple Crown Heavyweight Champion, four-time PWF World Heavyweight Champion, one-time AWA World Heavyweight Champion, one-time WCW United States Champion
2018		Bruiser Brody (Frank Goodish)	Posthumous honoree: three-time NWA International Heavyweight Champion, four-time NWA American Heavyweight Champion, one-time NWA Central States Heavyweight Champion, one-time NWA Florida Heavyweight Champion, one-time WWA World Heavyweight Champion (Indianapolis version)
2019		Sgt. Slaughter (Robert Rudolph Remus)	One-time WWF World Heavyweight Champion and two-time NWA United States Heavyweight Champion
2021		Mark Henry	His athleticism and toughness in the ring, brought a higher level of respect to professional wrestling from both inside and outsidepro wrestling
2022		Dan Spivey	One-time World Tag Team Champion (AJPW), one-time Florida Heavyweight Champion, one time UWF Americas Champion
2023		Haku (Tonga Fifita)	One-time WWF Tag Team Champion
2024		Arn Anderson (Martin Lunde)	Member of the "Four Horsemen", a four-time NWA/WCW World Television Champion, five-time NWA/WCW World Tag Team Champion and one-time WWF Tag Team Champion
2025		Ron Simmons	Recognized as the first African-American WCW World Heavyweight Champion, three-time WWF Tag Team Champion
2026		Jeff Jarrett	Six-time WWF Intercontinental Champion, one-time World Tag Team Champion (WWE), four-time WCW World Heavyweight Champion, six-time NWA World Heavyweight Championship, two-time AAA Mega Champion, co-founder of Total Nonstop Action Wrestling (TNA)
2027		Titus O'Neil (Thaddeus Bullard)	Previously received the 2020 Warrior Award from the WWE Hall of Fame for his philanthropic endeavors in the Tampa Bay area. In WWE, he was a one-time WWE Tag Team Champion.

=== James C. Melby Award recipients ===
James C. Melby was the first recipient of this award and it was subsequently named after him. It recognizes excellence in professional wrestling writing or historical preservation.

Year	Ring name (Birth name)	Notes
2006	James C. Melby	Longtime professional wrestling journalist
2007	Mike Chapman	Executive director of the Dan Gable Museum
2008	Greg Oliver	Honored with Steven Johnson. Canadian author and journalist, founded SLAM! Wrestling
2008	Steven Johnson	Honored with Greg Oliver. Has written several books on professional wrestling
2009	Mike Mooneyham	Author and columnist for The Post and Courier
2010	J Michael Kenyon	Wrestling historian and director of the Cauliflower Alley Club
2011	Scott Teal	Owner of Crowbar Press
2012	Bill Apter	Photographer and journalist for several magazines, including Pro Wrestling Illustrated
2013	George Napolitano	Professional wrestling photographer
2014	Larry Matysik	Announcer for Wrestling at the Chase
2015	Wade Keller	Journalist and founder of the Pro Wrestling Torch newsletter
2016	Dave Meltzer	Editor and publisher of Wrestling Observer Newsletter
2017	Scott Williams	Posthumous honoree: Wrestling historian and author
2018	Koji Miyamoto	Japanese wrestling historian and author of 16 books
2019	Brian Shields	Authored several WWE books
2021	Mark James	Historian and author of several books about territorial professional wrestling
2022	Dick Bourne	Written or co-written a number of books, including: Crown Jewel: The NWA Championship 1959–1973.
2023	Tom Burke	Historian and journalist for numerous publications
2024	Al Getz	Host of the Charting the Territories podcast
2025	Tim Hornbaker	Professional wrestling historian, author, researcher and preservationist
2026	Tony Richards	Historian and pro wrestler

=== Lou Thesz Award recipients ===
This award recognizes those in the professional wrestling industry who have used their skills in the realm of public service.

Year	Image	Ring name (Birth name)	Notes
2007	—N/a	Bill Murdock	Head of Eblen Charities (Note: In 2019, it was reported that Murdock had been convicted of taking indecent liberties with a child in 1988 and he has since been removed from the Hall of Fame's website.)
2008	—N/a	Father Jason Sanderson	Cauliflower Alley Club board member and promoter who held regional championships
2009	—N/a	Bill Kersten	Announcer for Kansas City Wrestling
2010		Rene Goulet (Robert Bédard)	One-time WWWF World Tag Team Champion
2011		Jim Ross	Longtime lead announcer for WWF/E, WCW and other regional promotions; Head of WWF Talent Relations during the Attitude Era, signing many well known wrestlers
2012		John "Bradshaw" Layfield	One-time WWE Champion, three-time WWF Tag Team Champion
2013		Edge (Adam Copeland)	Four-time WWE Champion, a record seven-time World Heavyweight Champion (WWE). He held the WWF/World and WWE Tag Team Championships a combined 14 times, more than any other wrestler
2014		Larry "The Axe" Hennig	Second time honored, previously inducted in 2006
2015		Brian Blair	Two-time NWA Florida Heavyweight Champion
2016		J. J. Dillon (James Morrison)	Longtime manager in the NWA, former WCW onscreen commissioner
2017		Magnum T. A. (Terry Allen)	Two-time Mid-South North American Champion, two-time NWA United States Heavyweight Champion
2018		Booker T (Robert Huffman)	Five-time WCW World Heavyweight Champion, one-time World Heavyweight Champion (WWE), a record six-time WCW World Television Champion, a record 11-time WCW World Tag Team Champion (10 of which came with his brother Stevie Ray as Harlem Heat)
2019	—N/a	Thunderbolt Patterson (Claude Patterson)	One-time CWA World Heavyweight Champion and one-time NWA Florida Heavyweight Champion
2021		Trish Stratus (Patricia Stratigias)	A record seven-time WWF/E Women's Champion
2023		Bill DeMott (William Charles DeMott II)	Two-times WCW United States Heavyweight Champion and one-time W*ING World Heavyweight Champion
2024		Tito Santana (Merced Solis)	Two-time WWE Intercontinental Champion, two-time WWF Tag Team Champion, 1989 winner of King of the Ring
2025		Madusa (Debrah Ann Miceli)	Three-time WWF Women's Champion, one-time WCW Cruiserweight Championship, and one-time AWA World Women's Champion
2026	—N/a	The Welch-Fuller Family	
2027		Rick Martel (Richard Vigneault)	One-time AWA World Heavyweight Champion, one-time WCW World Television Champion, three-time WWF Tag Team Champion

=== George Tragos Award recipients ===
This award recognizes wrestlers who have excelled in mixed martial arts.

Year	Image	Ring name (Birth name)	Notes
2011		Pat Miletich	Inaugural UFC Welterweight Champion and UFC 16 Welterweight Tournament Winner
2012		Dan Severn	Second time honored, previously received the Frank Gotch Award in 2002
2013		Matt Hughes	Two-time UFC Welterweight Champion, UFC Hall of Fame inductee, and NJCAA Hall of Fame inductee
2014		Randy Couture	Three-time UFC Heavyweight Champion, two-time UFC Light Heavyweight Champion
2015		Matt Lindland	Won a silver medal in wrestling at the 2000 Summer Olympics and later competed in mixed martial arts for several promotions
2016		Chael Sonnen	Amateur wrestler, mixed martial artist and noted Steroid Abuser who has competed in UFC, WEC and Pancrase
2017		Mike van Arsdale	Mixed martial artist who has competed in the UFC, World Fighting Alliance, and the IVC
2018		Ben Askren	One-time ONE Welterweight Champion, one-time Bellator Welterweight Champion
2019		Daniel Cormier	One-time UFC Heavyweight Champion and one-time UFC Light Heavyweight Champion
2021		Ken Shamrock	Inaugural UFC Superfight Champion. In professional wrestling, he held the NWA World Heavyweight Championship, WWF Intercontinental Championship and WWF Tag Team Championship once each.
2024	—N/a	Don Frye	Fought for UFC in 1996 – winning the UFC 8 and Ultimate Ultimate 1996 tournaments – and Pride Fighting Championships between 2001 and 2003. Also wrestled in New Japan Pro-Wrestling between 1997 and 2002.
2025	—N/a	Tank Abbott	Fought for UFC and wrestled for WCW
2026		Josh Barnett	One-time and youngest UFC Heavyweight Champion

=== Gordon Solie Award recipients ===
This award recognizes excellence in professional wrestling broadcasting.

Year	Image	Ring name (Birth name)	Notes
2021		Gordon Solie (Francis Labiak)	Posthumous honoree: commentator, announcer and promoter for Championship Wrestling from Florida, later worked for World Championship Wrestling
2022		Jim Ross	Second time honored, previously received the Lou Thesz Award in 2011
2023	—N/a	Conrad Thompson	Professional wrestling promoter, and podcast host and promotes the Starrcast wrestling convention
2024		Tony Schiavone	Lead commentator for Jim Crockett Promotions between 1985 and 1989, the World Wrestling Federation between 1989 and 1990, World Championship Wrestling between 1990 and 2001, and All Elite Wrestling since 2019.
2025		David Crockett	Professional wrestling announcer and executive in Jim Crockett Promotions, provided announcing for NWA World Championship Wrestling and World Wide Wrestling.
2026	—N/a	Ken Resnick	Announcer for the American Wrestling Association and the World Wrestling Federation
2027	—N/a	Lance Russell	Posthumous honoree: Longtime commentator for Continental Wrestling Association, later worked for World Championship Wrestling and Smoky Mountain Wrestling

=== Jack Brisco Spotlight/Red Belt Award recipients ===
Introduced in 2023, this award honors individuals who have made contributions to the professional wrestling industry by performing in various roles.

Year	Image	Ring name (Birth name)	Notes
2023		Les Thatcher (Leslie Malady)	Has performed various roles in the wrestling industry, including as a wrestler, trainer, promoter and announcer
2024		Tony Garea (Anthony Gareljich)	Five-time WWWF/WWF World Tag Team Champion, longtime backstage road agent for the WWF/WWE
2025		Eric Bischoff	Former announcer for the American Wrestling Association, Senior Vice President of World Championship Wrestling, on-screen general manager of WWE Raw, and executive producer of TNA Impact
2026		Jimmy Garvin (James Williams)	Four-time NWA American Heavyweight Champion, two-time NWA Texas Heavyweight Champion, one-time AWA World Tag Team Champion, two-time WCW World Tag Team Champion, two-time WCW United States Tag Team Champion, one-time WCW World Six-Man Tag Team Champion

=== Verne Gagne Trainer Award recipients ===
Introduced in 2023, this award recognizes excellence in the training of others for professional wrestling. In the December 2023 newsletter published by the hall, it was announced this award would be renamed in honor of Verne Gagne.

Year	Image	Ring name (Birth name)	Notes
2023		Boris Malenko (Lawrence J. Simon)	Posthumous honoree: Held various regional championships
2024		Tom Prichard	One-time WWF Tag Team Champion, eight-time SMW Tag Team Champion; trainer of Kurt Angle, The Rock, Randy Orton and many others.
2025	—N/a	Ron Hutchison	Canadian trainer of many prominent wrestlers, including Tragos/Thesz recipients Edge, Beth Phoenix, and Trish Stratus.
2026		Rodney Mack (Rodney Begnaud)	Honored with his wife Jazz, with whom he runs a wrestling school in San Antonio, Texas. One-time NWA World Tag Team Champion.
2026		Jazz (Carlene Denise Moore-Begnaud)	Honored with her husband Rodney Mack, with whom she runs a wrestling school in San Antonio, Texas. She is also a trainer at the WWE Performance Center. One-time NWA World Women's Champion, two-time WWF/E Women's Champion.
2027		Al Snow (Allen Sarven)	One-time WWF European Champion, one-time WWF Tag Team Champion, six-time WWF Hardcore Champion. Promoter and trainer of Ohio Valley Wrestling.

=== Impact Award recipients ===
This award recognizes individuals who have made a lasting impact on the industry.

Year	Image	Ring name (Birth name)	Notes
2024	—N/a	Tim Dalton	Longtime professional wrestling fan who attended all previous induction ceremonies
2025		Baron von Raschke (James Raschke)	Second time honored, previously inducted in 2002.
2026	—N/a	James Beard	Longtime referee who worked in World Class Championship Wrestling and the World Wrestling Federation.
