= Koji Miyamoto =

Japanese professional wrestling historian

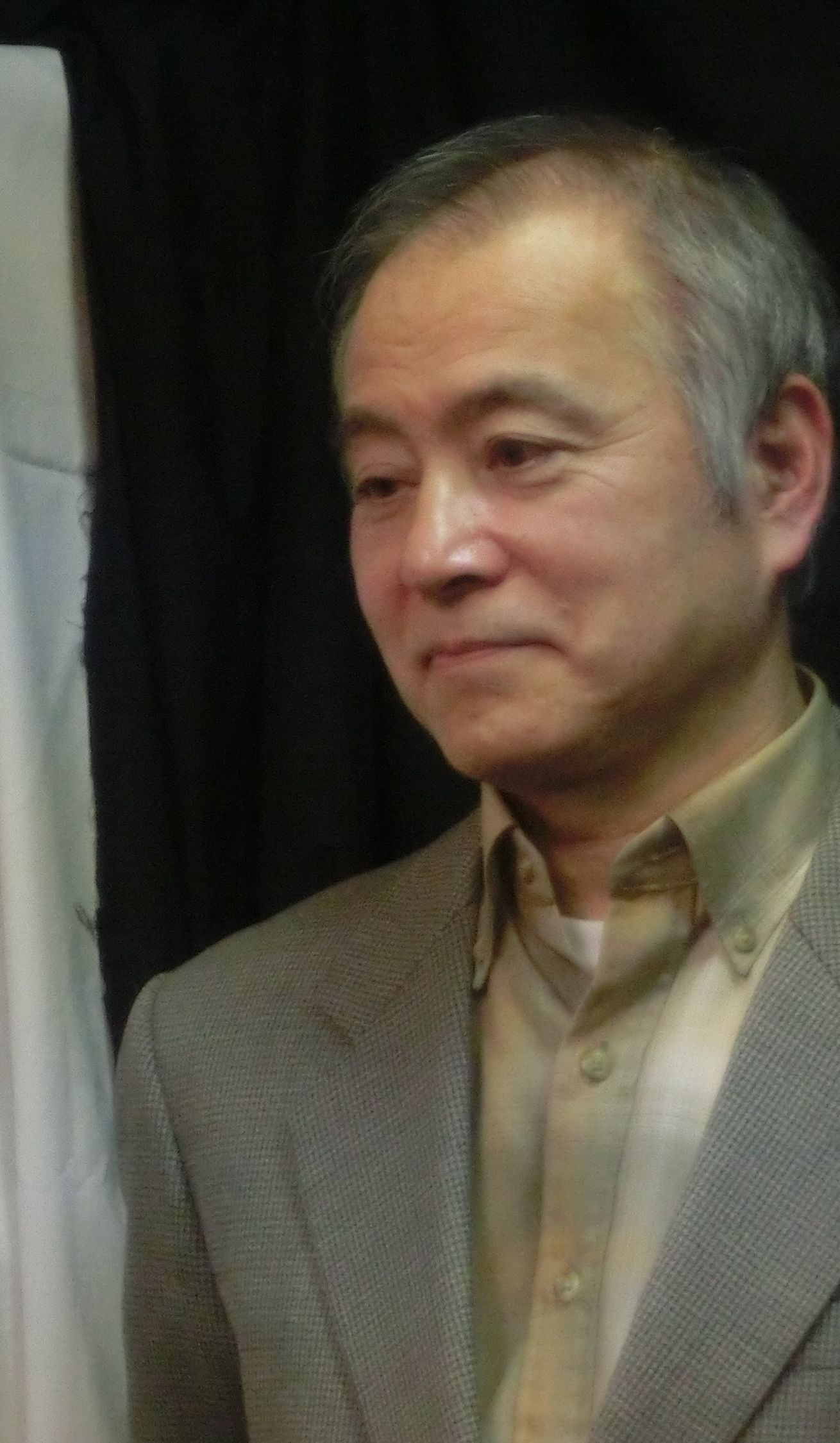
- Occupations: Author, historian
- Writing career
- Pen name: Tomomi Nagare
- Subjects: Professional wrestling Mixed martial arts

Koji Miyamoto is a Japanese professional wrestling historian and writer, best known for his work on Lou Thesz. He has authored sixteen books.

== Awards ==
- Cauliflower Alley Club
  - James C. Melby Historian Award (2023)
- National Wrestling Hall of Fame
  - James C. Melby Award (2018)

== See also ==
- James C. Melby
