= Larry Matysik =

American professional wrestling commentator and promoter (1947–2018)

Matysik

Larry Matysik (April 26, 1947 – November 25, 2018) was an American professional wrestling commentator, promoter and author best known for his commentary on Wrestling at the Chase.

== Biography ==
In 1963, Matysik was hired by St. Louis promoter Sam Muchnick at the age of 16 to work as a publicist and office manager. In 1970, Matysik became an announcer for his promotion. Along with Gordon Solie and Lance Russell, Matysik was considered one of the top wrestling announcers in the country. He remained Wrestling at the Chase's ringside announcer until the show went off the air in 1983. He would also occasionally do commentary for the American Wrestling Association.

Behind the scenes, Matysik was responsible for several aspects of the business. He served as co-booker with Pat O'Connor and was partly responsible for the company's success in the late 1970s. In 1983, Matysik severed ties with the St. Louis office and started a promotion outside the control of the National Wrestling Alliance, Greater St. Louis Wrestling Enterprises. Matysik was a close friend of Bruiser Brody, who created the promotion with him. Their promotion was financially successful, but issues behind-the-scenes caused problems for financiers. From 1984 to 1993, Matysik worked for Vince McMahon's World Wrestling Federation.

In later years, he remained active on the independent circuit and authored many books. He was also responsible for creating the St. Louis Wrestling Hall of Fame, and was personally inducted in 2007. He battled a number of health issues towards the end of his life, including spinal stenosis and he suffered at least three strokes. He received the James C. Melby Award from the George Tragos/Lou Thesz Professional Wrestling Hall of Fame in 2014 but was too ill to attend the ceremony. On November 24, 2018 it was reported that he had entered hospice care, and he died the following day. In his obituary, Wrestling Observer Newsletter founder Dave Meltzer wrote that he "learned more about pro wrestling from him than perhaps any other individual".

== Awards and accomplishments ==
- Cauliflower Alley Club
  - Posthumous Award (2019)
- George Tragos/Lou Thesz Professional Wrestling Hall of Fame
  - James C. Melby Award (2014)
- Missouri Wrestling Revival
  - Lifetime Achievement Award (2010)
- St. Louis Wrestling Hall of Fame
  - Class of 2007
