= Wrestling at the Chase =

Professional wrestling television series

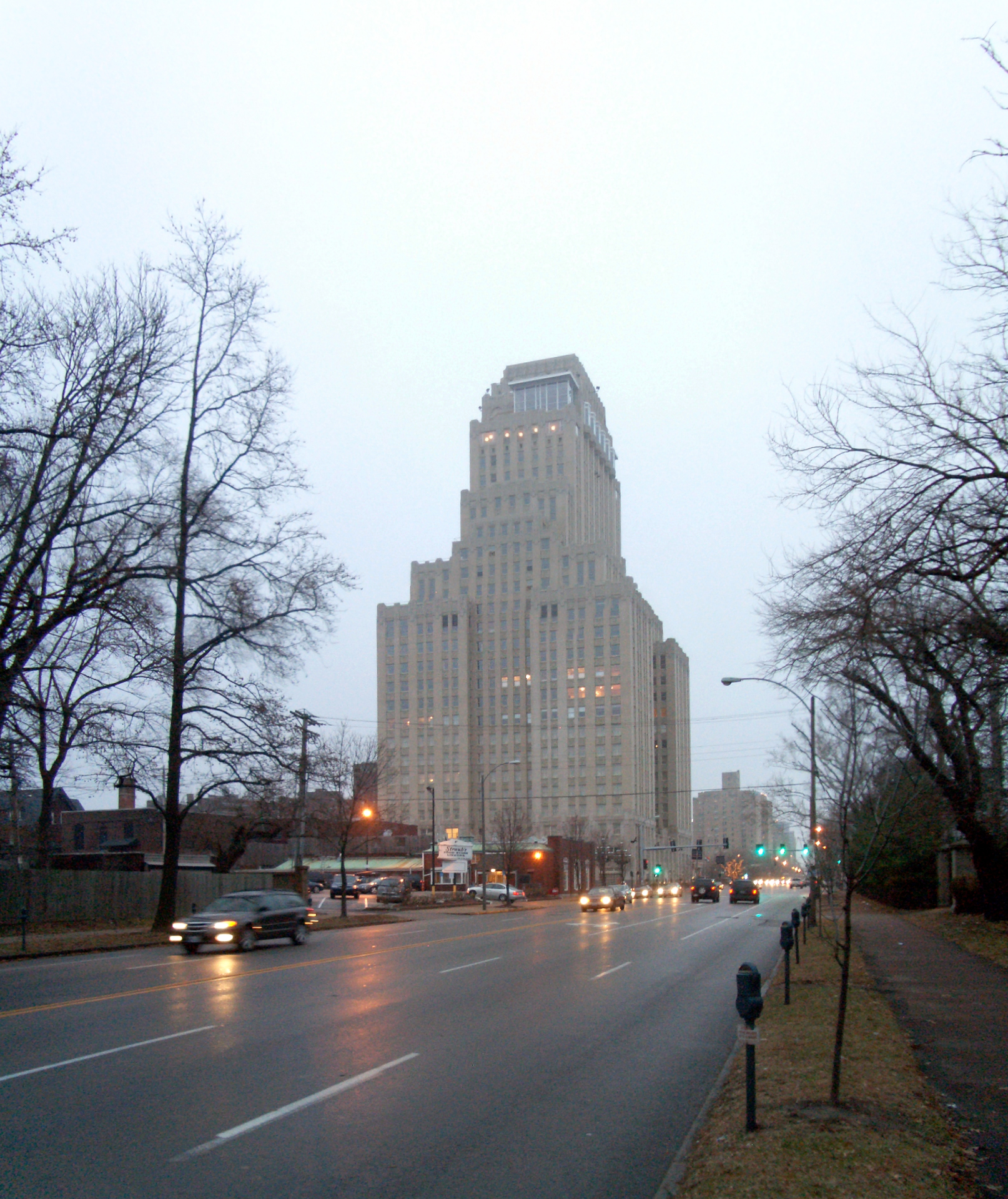
Chase Park Plaza

Wrestling at the Chase is a professional wrestling television series of local and national historical importance in the field of television wrestling. The show was recorded in St. Louis, Missouri, for KPLR-TV, Channel 11, and aired from May 23, 1959, to September 10, 1983. It was promoted by the St. Louis Wrestling Club, which was a member of the National Wrestling Alliance.

== Origin ==
The show was the brainchild of Sam Muchnick, president of the St. Louis Wrestling Club, and Harold Koplar, who owned KPLR and the Chase Park Plaza Hotel. The two were together on an airplane in 1958 and wondered how they could put wrestling into St. Louis-area homes. A few episodes under that name were filmed elsewhere locally. The WWF also filmed some episodes at the Chase.

== The program ==
The original series began on May 23, 1959 and ran until September 10, 1983. KPLR-TV, Channel 11 produced and televised the matches, which were held at the Chase Park Plaza Hotel in St. Louis' Central West End and televised at 10:00 A.M.; conveniently, the KPLR studios were in an adjacent, connecting building.

Initially, the matches were broadcast live on Saturday nights and repeated on Sunday mornings. This production method was later replaced by a live-to-tape system, meaning that while the performances were recorded for later broadcast, they were shot entirely in one take as if airing live, so that no allowances were made for unforeseen or unscripted developments or events.

The show produced approximately 1,100 episodes over its 24 years. On a few occasions, for matches that would attract larger crowds, the show would be recorded in the Kiel Auditorium or the St. Louis Arena.

Although the St. Louis Wrestling Club began by recording one show at a time, in the early 1970s they began recording three shows at a time on Sunday mornings. Admission to the recordings was free, and the room in which the matches took place seated 900 fans.

=== Personnel ===
Joe Garagiola was the initial play-by-play commentator. When he left in 1963, Don Cunningham took his place. The following year, Cunningham died, and was replaced with George Abel. He was joined in 1972 by Larry Matysik, who at the time, was also a part-time police officer in Belleville, Illinois. Ring announcers included John Curley, Eddie Gromacki and Joe Garagiola's brother Mickey Garagiola.

The show featured many of the most famous wrestlers in the NWA. Participants included Ric Flair, Harley Race, "Cowboy" Bob Orton, Dick the Bruiser, Bruiser Brody, Gene Kiniski, Lou Thesz, Dory Funk, Jr. and Ted DiBiase.

== WWF tapings held at the Chase ==
KPLR ended its relationship with the St. Louis Wrestling Club in September 1983 and ended that version of Wrestling at the Chase. The station made a deal by which the World Wrestling Federation (WWF) would produce its wrestling-related programming. On December 27, 1983 and January 16, 1984, the WWF held TV tapings at the Chase Park Plaza that were turned into several episodes of Wrestling at the Chase, which began airing in 1984. The first of these shows featured the first WWF appearance of Gene Okerlund and Hulk Hogan's first WWF match in his second stint with the promotion, after his departure from the American Wrestling Association.

In February 1984, tapings for Wrestling at the Chase shifted to Kiel Auditorium. The WWF returned to the Chase Park Plaza for a final taping at 11am on Saturday, September 29, 1984. This taping followed a Friday night live event at St. Louis' Kiel Auditorium. The last airing of the program with original local content was on October 21, 1984. After a shift to syndicated WWF material, the program was canceled in 1985.

== Legacy ==
Wrestling at the Chase was consistently one of the highest rated television shows in St. Louis. Among St. Louis-based shows, it was third behind the local news and St. Louis Cardinals baseball games. The show often had over 100,000 viewers per episode. It is considered one of the pro wrestling industry's most historic programs.

As of 2009, 12 volumes of the program have been released for sale. In 2005, Larry Matysik's book, Wrestling at the Chase: The Inside Story of Sam Muchnick and the Legends of Professional Wrestling, was published by ECW Press.

Content from Wrestling at the Chase became available on the Global Wrestling Network on October 10, 2017.

== Revival ==
In July 2021 National Wrestling Alliance President Billy Corgan announced that the NWA would return to The Chase Park Plaza for a four-night series of events at the end of August 2021. The events included an all-female Pay Per View event entitled NWA EmPowerrr, produced by Mickie James, following her departure from WWE, as well as the NWA 73rd Anniversary Show, to be headlined by an NWA Worlds Heavyweight Championship match between champion Nick Aldis and Trevor Murdoch, as well as two nights of TV tapings.
