= Roger Deem =

American photographer (1958–2020)

- Born: 7 February 1958
- Died: 18 December 2020 (aged 62)
- Occupation: Wrestling photographer

Roger Deem (February 7, 1958 – December 18, 2020) was an American professional wrestling photographer who worked in the Midwestern area.

== Career ==
Deem was based out of Jacksonville, Illinois and covered wrestling events for many national and international magazines and publications between 1973 and 1983.

Deem photographed wrestling cards staged in St. Louis, Missouri, at the Kiel Auditorium and The Checkerdome under the promotional banner of Sam Muchnick's St. Louis Wrestling Club. He was also a fixture on the program Wrestling at the Chase, for KPLR-TV.

Deem worked throughout the Kansas City area with the American Wrestling Association promotion. He is the only photographer to have been twice awarded the Photo of the Year Award by the Wrestling Fans International Association: once at its 1977 convention in Dallas and another time at the 1979 gathering in Memphis. Deem retired from wrestling photography in late 1983.

== Books ==
- St. Louis Snapshots: The Last Years of the Sam Muchnick Era (2004 memoir)
- The Strap - A Complete History of Sam Muchnick's Missouri State Championship published by Crowbar Press (2013)
