= Pat O'Connor (wrestler) =

New Zealand professional and amateur wrestler

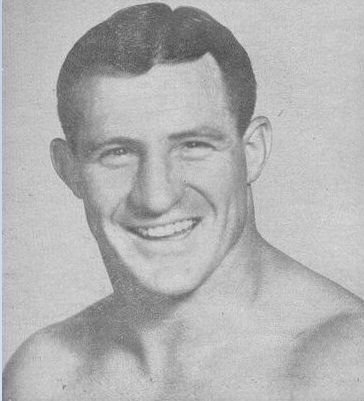
- O'Connor in the 1950s

Personal information
- Born: Patrick John O'Connor; 22 August 1924 Raetihi, New Zealand
- Died: 16 August 1990 (aged 65) St Louis, Missouri, U.S.
- Education: Massey Agricultural College
- Spouse: Remember Carly Ford (m. 1953; div. 1968)
- Military service
- Allegiance: New Zealand
- Branch: Royal New Zealand Air Force
- Service years: 1945
- Conflicts: World War II

Professional wrestling career
- Ring name: Pat O'Connor
- Billed height: 6 ft 0 in (1.83 m)
- Billed weight: 230 lb (100 kg)
- Billed from: Wanganui, New Zealand
- Trained by: Butch Levy
- Debut: 1950
- Retired: 1987

Medal record

Men's wrestling

Representing New Zealand

British Empire Games
Silver medal – second place	1950 Auckland	Heavyweight

Patrick John O'Connor (22 August 1924 – 16 August 1990) was a New Zealand-American amateur wrestler and professional wrestler. Regarded as one of the premier workers of his era, O'Connor held the AWA World Heavyweight Championship and NWA World Heavyweight Championship simultaneously, the latter of which he held for approximately two years. He was also the inaugural AWA World Heavyweight Champion. He is an overall two-time world champion.

== Early life ==
Patrick John O'Connor was born on 22 August 1924 in Raetihi, New Zealand, to parents John Frederick and Isabella. He attended primary schools in Raetihi and Orautoha, then Feilding Agricultural High School. During his schooldays, he also helped tend to the sheep and cattle on his parents' farm. He later attended Massey Agricultural College, and later served for six months in the Royal New Zealand Air Force during World War II in 1945.

== Amateur wrestling career ==
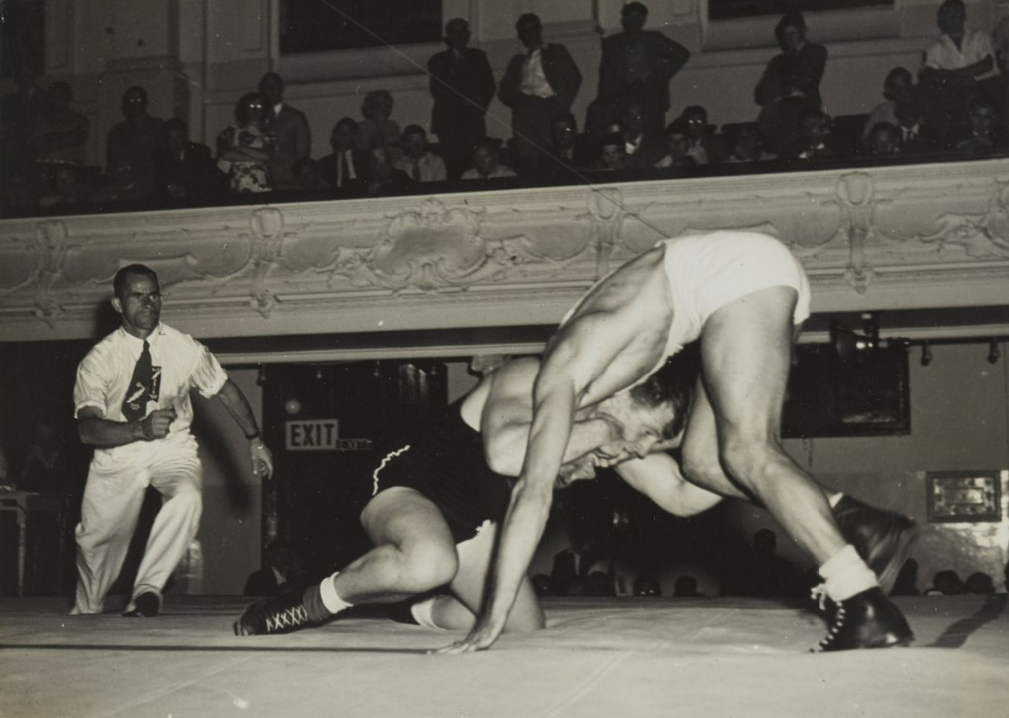
Patrick O'Connor and Kenneth Richmond battle for the silver medal at the 1950 British Empire Games

Before entering the world of professional wrestling, O'Connor was an amateur wrestler. He trained under Dave Scarrow, and later Don Anderson, while working as a blacksmith to pay the bills. After a tournament in 1947, he joined the Wellington wrestling team and trained under Anton Koolmann. In 1948, he represented New Zealand in the Pan American games. O'Connor won the New Zealand Heavyweight Championship in amateur wrestling in both 1949 and 1950. The 1949 win earned him entry into the 1950 British Empire Games. At the Empire Games, O'Connor, once again representing New Zealand, won a silver medal winner in the (freestyle) heavyweight division. He later trained to be a professional wrestler under Len Levy.

== Professional wrestling career ==
=== National Wrestling Alliance (1950–1960) ===
On 19 March 1955, O'Connor won the NWA World Tag Team Championship (Chicago version) with tag team partner Roy McClarity, and held the title until February 1956. Later in the year, he worked for Maple Leaf Wrestling. In March, he won the NWA British Empire Heavyweight Championship (Toronto version), but lost it on 2 May 1957 to Gene Kiniski. That same month, O'Connor and Whipper Billy Watson won the NWA Canadian Open Tag Team Championship, but lost it to Gene Kiniski and Fritz Von Erich on 31 October of that year.

O'Connor held the NWA World Heavyweight Championship from 1959 to 1961. He first won the title on 9 January 1959 from Dick Hutton, who had held the title for thirteen months. O'Connor's reign was recognised by both the National Wrestling Alliance and the National Wrestling Association. The title change was part of the rivalry between bookers Sam Muchnick and Fred Kohler, the latter of whom did not want to waste any money announcing O'Connor as the new champion. Kohler also wanted O'Connor to pay him $10,000 (equivalent to $110,445 in 2025) to wrestle at shows in Chicago, while being paid less than champions usually earned. O'Connor was so angry at the suggestion that he walked out of their meeting and later told Muchnick not to book him for any events in Chicago. The men later worked out a deal of sorts, and beginning on 19 February 1960, O'Connor wrestled in Chicago against Bruno Sammartino and Johnny Valentine, among others.

On 29 July at one of Fred Kohler's events, O'Connor defeated Yukon Eric at an event with an attendance of 30,275. During this time, television also became a factor in the burgeoning market for professional wrestling, and as a result, the demand to trade wrestlers, including O'Connor, throughout the territories, was eased due to Vincent McMahon's Capitol Wrestling. In December, he worked for McMahon in the Northeast. In March 1961, he was suspended for sixteen days when he missed a match in New York. On 30 June 1961, O'Connor dropped the title to Buddy Rogers in front of 38,622 fans at Comiskey Park, a North American professional wrestling attendance record that lasted until Toronto's The Big Event in 1986. The ticket revenue of $148,000 (equivalent to $1,595,000 in 2025) was a professional wrestling record for almost twenty years. The match, a two out of three falls match, was billed as the "Match of the Century". During the match, both men had gained a pinfall, when O'Connor missed a dropkick and suffered a legit groin injury on the ropes, after which Rogers pinned him to win the match.

=== American Wrestling Association (1960–1970) ===
In May 1960, while he was still the NWA World Heavyweight Champion, the American Wrestling Association (AWA) named O'Connor as the first holder of the AWA World Heavyweight Championship when they seceded from the NWA. Therefore, he held both the AWA and NWA World Heavyweight Championships simultaneously. However, he never defended the AWA World Heavyweight Championship, and was stripped of it in August, after ninety days, when Verne Gagne was recognised as the new champion. O'Connor never appeared in an AWA event during, or prior to, this period. Naming the current NWA champion as its champion and then ordering him to defend his new title against the number one contender was a way of legitimizing the AWA's claim that its champion was the "true" world champion (by showing a lineage to the NWA World Heavyweight Championship).

Long after he had lost the NWA Championship, O'Connor did appear in the AWA. On 10 November 1967, the team of O'Connor and Wilbur Snyder defeated Larry Hennig and Harley Race to win the AWA World Tag Team Championship. They lost the title on 2 December to Mitsu Arakawa and Dr. Moto. O'Connor and Snyder also defeated Arakawa and Moto for the World Wrestling Association's WWA World Tag Team Championship on 24 September 1968. They lost the title on 26 October to the same team.

=== Later career (1970–1987) ===
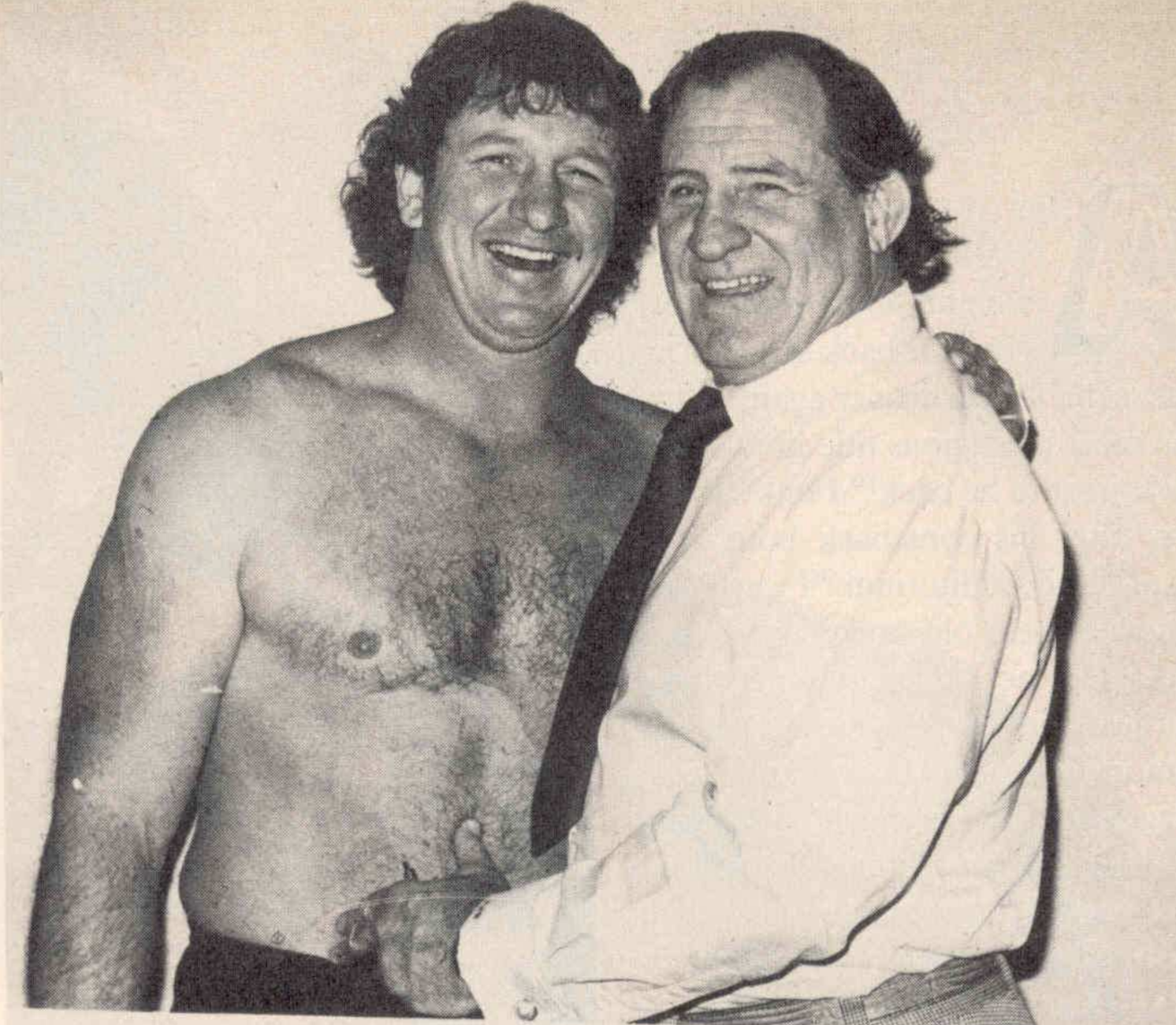
O'Connor with Terry Funk

On 13 October 1970, O'Connor was introduced as Jim Crockett Promotions's first NWA Eastern Heavyweight Champion as part of a storyline to introduce the title. The title was later awarded to the Missouri Mauler with the announcement that Mauler won it in New York.

On 1 January 1982, O'Connor was part of the card that comprised promoter Sam Muchnick's last professional wrestling show, located in St. Louis. O'Connor was also one of the owners of the St. Louis Wrestling Club. O'Connor, along with Verne Gagne, Harley Race, and Bob Geigel purchased the territory from Sam Muchnick the day after Muchnick's retirement. On 18 September 1983, O'Connor was named as a co-conspirator in the monopoly that controlled professional wrestling in Missouri, Kansas, and Iowa. O'Connor filed a counterclaim.

On 16 November 1987, O'Connor participated in a World Wrestling Federation "Legends" battle royal, which was won by Lou Thesz.

== Personal life ==
O'Connor married the American Remember Carly Ford on 7 July 1953; the couple had three daughters before divorcing in 1968. At the time of his death, O'Connor's partner was Julie Browne. O'Connor became a naturalized American citizen in 1958 and lived in the United States for the rest of his life.

== Death ==
O'Connor died of cancer on 16 August 1990.

In December 1990, World Championship Wrestling held the Pat O'Connor Memorial International Cup Tag Team Tournament, an eight-team international tag team memorial tournament at Starrcade in honour of O'Connor. In 1996, he was inducted into the Wrestling Observer Newsletter Hall of Fame. In 2007, the Professional Wrestling Hall of Fame inducted O'Connor. He is also a member of the Stampede Wrestling Hall of Fame. In 2016, O'Connor became a "Legacy" member of the WWE Hall of Fame.

== Championships and accomplishments ==
=== Amateur wrestling ===
- 1950 British Empire Games silver medal in freestyle wrestling (heavyweight)
- New Zealand Heavyweight Championship (1949, 1950)

=== Professional wrestling ===
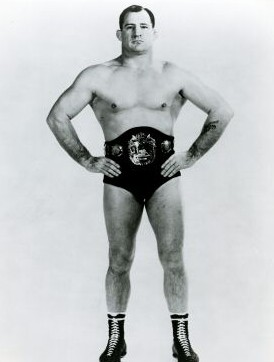
O'Connor as NWA World Heavyweight Champion

- American Wrestling Association
  - AWA World Heavyweight Championship (1 time)
  - AWA World Tag Team Championship (1 time) – with Wilbur Snyder
- Central States Wrestling
  - NWA Central States Heavyweight Championship (3 times)
  - NWA Central States Tag Team Championship (1 time) – with Bob Brown
  - NWA North American Tag Team Championship (Central States version) (2 times) – with Sonny Myers
  - NWA United States Heavyweight Championship (Central States version) (3 times)
  - NWA World Tag Team Championship (Central States version) (5 times) – with Sonny Myers (1 time), Tiny Mills (1 time), Bob Geigel (1 time), Harley Race (1time), and Omar Atlas (1 time)
- Eastern Sports Association
  - ESA North American Championship ( 1 time )
- Fred Kohler Enterprises
  - NWA World Tag Team Championship (Chicago version) (1 time) – with Roy McClarity
- George Tragos/Lou Thesz Professional Wrestling Hall of Fame
  - Class of 2004
- Maple Leaf Wrestling
  - NWA British Empire Heavyweight Championship (Toronto version) (1 time)
  - NWA Canadian Open Tag Team Championship (1 time) – with Whipper Billy Watson
- Mid-Atlantic Championship Wrestling
  - NWA Eastern Heavyweight Championship (1 time)
- NWA Minneapolis Wrestling and Boxing Club
  - NWA World Tag Team Championship (Minneapolis version) (1 time) - with Tony Baillargeon
- Midwest Wrestling Association
  - Ohio Heavyweight Championship (1 time)
- Montreal Athletic Commission
  - World Heavyweight Championship (Montreal version) (2 times)
- National Wrestling Alliance
  - NWA Hall of Fame (class of 2011)
  - NWA World Six-Man Tag Team Championship (1 time) – with Roy McClarity and Yukon Eric
- NWA New Zealand
  - NWA British Empire/Commonwealth Championship (New Zealand version) (2 times)
- NWA Rocky Mountain
  - NWA Rocky Mountain Heavyweight Championship (1 time)
- Professional Wrestling Hall of Fame
  - Class of 2007
- Stampede Wrestling
  - Stampede Wrestling Hall of Fame (Class of 1995)
- St. Louis Wrestling Club
  - NWA World Heavyweight Championship (1 time)
- St. Louis Wrestling Hall of Fame
  - Class of 2007
- World Wrestling Association
  - WWA World Tag Team Championship (1 time) – with Wilbur Snyder
- Wrestling Observer Newsletter
  - Wrestling Observer Newsletter Hall of Fame (Class of 1996)
- WWE
  - WWE Hall of Fame (Class of 2016)
