= Norman Kietzer =

American sports journalist (born 1944)

Norman Kietzer (born 1944) is an American retired sports journalist, known for his work within the professional wrestling industry. During the 1960s and 1970s, Kietzer published The Wrestling News, as well as co-editing Major League Wrestling Programs with James C. Melby. He also edited Wrestling Monthly.
