= St. Louis Wrestling Club =

Professional wrestling promotion based in St. Louis, Missouri

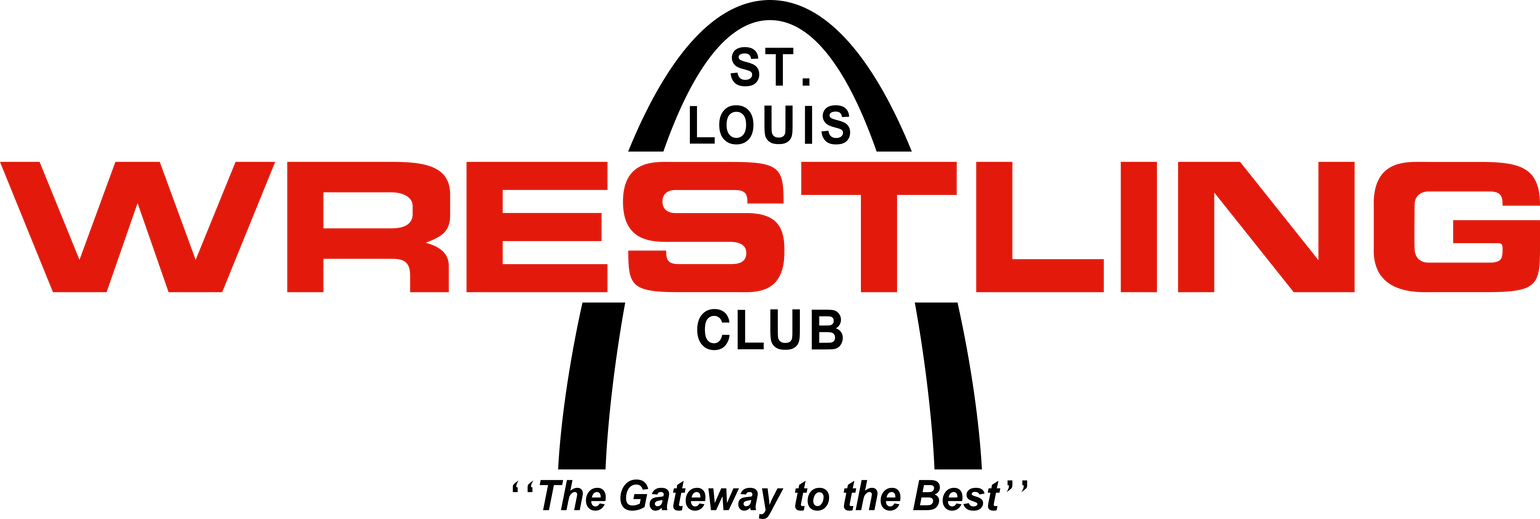
- Acronym: St. Louis
- Founded: 1959
- Defunct: 1985
- Style: American wrestling
- Headquarters: St. Louis, Missouri
- Founder: Sam Muchnick
- Owner: TKO Group Holdings
- Parent: WWE Libraries (WWE)
- Sister: Central States Wrestling
- Formerly: Sam Muchnick Sports Attractions

Sam Muchnick Sports Attractions, operating as the St. Louis Wrestling Club, was a professional wrestling promotion based in St. Louis, Missouri. It was owned and operated by Sam Muchnick. The promotion was a flagship member of the National Wrestling Alliance, and promoted primarily in the St. Louis area. It was colloquially referred to within the business as the "St. Louis office" of the NWA.

== Television ==
Its weekly television program, Wrestling at the Chase (carried by KPLR-TV), is considered one of the legendary programs in the history of professional wrestling, and ran from 1959 until 1983, and the St. Louis Wrestling Club lasted two years more until 1985.

== History ==
Sam Muchnick gained a reputation as a fair and honest promoter, which was uncommon in the early days of professional wrestling. His background in sportswriting would also allow wrestling to receive dignified and regular coverage in local media, and also influenced his booking style. In contrast with other territories, Muchnick regularly eschewed outlandish gimmicks, absurd stipulation matches or convoluted finishes to matches. He by and large respected the intelligence of fans and did not push specific babyfaces or heels on them, and in turn he gained a loyal and smart base of fans in St. Louis, who made the promotion one of the most important offices in the United States. In another anomaly, the St. Louis Wrestling Club did not recognize a tag team championship, focusing mainly on singles matches and angles. Muchnick did not operate St. Louis as a territory, preferring to run only his monthly cards at Kiel Auditorium and the St. Louis Arena.

Popular wrestling stars featured by the St. Louis Wrestling Club included Ric Flair, Harley Race (who was also a minority owner of the St. Louis Wrestling Club and Central States Wrestling), Dick the Bruiser, Gene Kiniski, Lou Thesz and Ted DiBiase. Undercard spots were filled by wrestlers from Central States Wrestling, as Muchnick did not maintain a permanent roster.

In 1982, Muchnick retired and the St. Louis Wrestling Club was purchased by Bob Geigel and others. Geigel also owned Central States Wrestling. Geigel found himself in competition with Muchnick's former announcer and general manager Larry Matysik, who felt that Geigel and Race's booking strategy did not fit the town, and ran an opposing promotion. Matysik and KPLR director Ted Koplar would both ink deals with Vince McMahon in 1983, giving the WWF a foothold in the St. Louis area and the traditional "Wrestling At The Chase" timeslot. By 1985, the WWF and Hulk Hogan were gaining huge popularity in the St Louis area, and the organization began to lose profits. In 1985, the St. Louis office was purchased by Jim Crockett Promotions, and was absorbed into what soon became World Championship Wrestling. The last Club card happened on New Year's Day 1986; in the main event, Race battled NWA World Heavyweight Champion Flair to a double disqualification.

== Championships ==
The St. Louis Wrestling Club was part of the National Wrestling Alliance, who recognized the NWA World Heavyweight Championship as their world title, and the champion would frequently tour the St. Louis territory. Outside of the NWA World Heavyweight Championship, the territory recognized or promoted the following titles at some point in time:

- NWA Missouri Heavyweight Championship (1972–1985)
- NWA United States Heavyweight Championship (Central States version) (1963–1968)
- NWA Central States Heavyweight Championship (1950–1972)

The Central States Heavyweight title was the forerunner to the Missouri Heavyweight Championship. The title was created after a controversy on January 28, 1972, where Pat O'Connor defeated Harley Race for the Central States title. When promoters refused to recognize the title change and kept promoting Harley Race as the Central States champion, Muchnick stopped recognizing the Central States title, opting instead to resurrect the inactive Missouri Heavyweight title.
