= Sam Muchnick =

American professional wrestling promoter (1905–1998)

- Born: Jeshua Muchnick; August 22, 1905; Novohrad-Volynskyi, Russian Empire (now Zviahel, Zhytomyr Oblast, Ukraine)
- Died: December 30, 1998 (aged 93); St. Louis, Missouri, U.S.
- Occupation: Professional wrestling promoter
- Spouse: Helen Wildefong (m. 1947; died 1981)
- Children: 3
- Military service
- Allegiance: United States
- Branch: United States Army Air Forces
- Service years: 1942–1945
- Rank: Corporal
- Conflicts: World War II

Samuel Muchnick (born Jeshua Muchnick; (Note: Ukrainian: Ієшуа Мучник Russian: Иешуа Мучник Yiddish: יעשוע מוטשניק) August 22, 1905 – December 30, 1998) was an American professional wrestling promoter, long based in St. Louis, Missouri. He is often regarded as wrestling's equivalent of Pete Rozelle (the forward-thinking commissioner who revolutionized the NFL), and he was instrumental in establishing the National Wrestling Alliance, which became the industry's top governing body, in 1948. Muchnick served as the NWA's president from 1950 to 1960 and again from 1963 to 1975. He operated the St. Louis Wrestling Club, one of the primary members of the NWA, based in St. Louis.

== Early life ==
Muchnick was born in the Russian Empire to Jewish parents Saul Muchnick and Rebecca Bayla Solovkovich in 1905, in Novohrad-Volyns'kyi (present-day Zviahel, Ukraine). His family emigrated to the United States in 1911, settling in St. Louis, Missouri. His name was changed to Samuel when his father decided that Jeshua (Jesus or Joshua) was an inappropriate name for a Jewish child.

While attending school, he worked various jobs to help out his family before earning his high school degree (though he ditched his graduation to attend a live wrestling event at the Odeon Theatre, where he watched Wladek Zbyszko in action). In 1924, he took a job with the U.S. Post Office; (Note: The current U.S. Postal Service was not established until 1971.) and in 1926, he joined the sports staff at the St. Louis Times newspaper, where he covered the St. Louis Cardinals baseball team while developing many influential acquaintances (including Babe Ruth, Al Capone, and others). Muchnick also covered professional wrestling, where he formed a friendship with Tom Packs, who was the Midwest's top sports promoter. In 1932, the Times merged with the rival St. Louis Star, and Muchnick left the paper for a position as Packs' publicist, where he handled public relations, finances and even booking duties.

== Promoting career ==
=== St. Louis promoter ===
For nine years, Muchnick served as Tom Packs' righthand man while learning the ropes under one of the nation's most powerful promoters. However, Muchnick was insulted when Packs awarded him a paltry $200 bonus following the duo's successful promotion of the Joe Louis vs. Tony Musto heavyweight title bout in April 1941 (a fight that drew profits of $14,000). Muchnick then decided to leave his mentor when longtime wrestling champion Jim Londos (who was also on the outs with Packs) convinced him to start his own organization. Despite facing heavy resistance from Packs (who possessed much political clout with the State Athletic Commission), Muchnick promoted his first shows in May 1942 before enlisting in the Air Force during World War II. Muchnick spent most of his service in a non-combat role in the Panama Canal Zone, and was discharged in 1945 as a Corporal.

Upon returning, Muchnick continued to face competitive pressures from Packs; though he filed several court injunctions to promote his first show at St. Louis' renowned Kiel Auditorium on December 5, 1945. With the help of maverick Ohio promoter Jack Pfefer (who sent Sam several wrestlers to help him get started), Muchnick drew 3,771 fans to the arena while featuring such veteran wrestling stars as Ed "Strangler" Lewis, Roy Dunn, and others.

=== National Wrestling Alliance ===
Over the next few years, Muchnick was often forced to use old-timers past their primes as Packs employed most of the top talent (including reigning World Champion Lou Thesz). Then, in mid-1948, Muchnick was approached by Iowa's Pinky George and Minnesota's Tony Stecher about forming a new wrestling union. Up until this time, all pro wrestling regulations had come from the National Wrestling Association, which was made up of various athletic commissions. Their idea was to form a coalition of promoters, which would then share the bookings of the World Champion and top wrestlers while also splitting the gate draws. As a result, on July 19, 1948, Muchnick met with fellow promoters Pinky George, Wally Karbo (representing Tony Stecher), Orville Brown, Max Clayton, and Al Haft at the President Hotel in Waterloo, Iowa to form what was named the National Wrestling Alliance. Pinky George was named the organization's first President while Orville Brown was subsequently recognized as the first NWA World Heavyweight Champion. Shortly thereafter, Muchnick became the beneficiary of talent exchanges with various territories that joined the NWA. As a result, he was then able to secure the services of an innovative young heel named "Nature Boy" Buddy Rogers, who had previously been wrestling in Jack Pfefer's Toledo, Ohio territory. Rogers' outspoken persona and charismatic personality allowed him to outdraw even the great Lou Thesz (who by now had taken over much of Tom Packs' operation) while adding legitimacy to Muchnick's company. Eventually, the two St. Louis groups would merge while starting a promotional war angle; Muchnick kept a controlling interest in the territory by holding two percentage points more than Thesz. Then, on November 27, 1949, Thesz unified the National Wrestling Association and National Wrestling Alliance World Titles after Brown was injured in an auto accident prior to their scheduled match.

=== NWA President ===
In 1950, Sam Muchnick was named the new president of the NWA, a position to which he was unanimously re-elected for the next nine years due to the immense trust that he inspired among the various members of the organization. With Muchnick at the helm, the NWA became the dominant governing body in pro wrestling, as nearly every major wrestling territory across the country joined the Alliance in order to gain access to the treasure chest that was the NWA World Heavyweight Champion, who was universally recognized as the industry's premier star. Under Muchnick's leadership, the NWA would also donate thousands of dollars to help fund the U.S. Olympic Wrestling Team. Then, in the late 1950s, Sam Muchnick formed the St. Louis Wrestling Club while producing a new television program titled Wrestling at the Chase on KPLR-TV, which ran from May 23, 1959, to Sept. 10, 1983. There were approximately 1,100 episodes made during that time span. The show would become one of the most popular local productions in St. Louis television history, as it turned pro wrestling into a nationally popular entertainment while bringing the many stars of the NWA into the homes of its fans.

By 1960, Sam Muchnick stepped aside as NWA president so that the organization could benefit from new ideas. He served as executive secretary under Frank Tunney, Fred Kohler and Karl "Doc" Sarpolis. Consequently, Muchnick was unanimously re-installed as NWA president in 1963 and held the office until 1975, thus contributing a total of 25 years as the industry's most influential promoter. During his second reign, Muchnick maintained the NWA's position as wrestling's top power while he also displayed an uncanny eye for scouting future talent, as his St. Louis territory groomed such eventual champions as Johnny Valentine, Gene Kiniski, Harley Race, Dory Funk Jr., Terry Funk, Ric Flair, and many others. Moreover, he expanded the NWA globally by inking agreements with territories in Mexico, the Far East, Europe, and the Caribbean.

=== Retirement ===
Muchnick promoted his last card on January 1, 1982, which was subsequently named "Sam Muchnick Day" in St. Louis by Mayor Vincent Schoemehl. Shortly afterward, the St. Louis Wrestling Club was purchased by Bob Geigel, Pat O'Connor and Harley Race. Muchnick's former announcer and general manager Larry Matysik formed his own competing promotion in St. Louis around the same time. A year later, the WWF made a deal with Matysik which brought them into St. Louis and gave them the former TV timeslot of "Wrestling at the Chase." In 1985, the St. Louis Wrestling Club was sold to Jim Crockett Jr. and absorbed into what eventually became World Championship Wrestling. In 1990, he spoke at the beginning of WCW’s Starrcade. In 1997, during the World Wrestling Federation’s Badd Blood: In Your House pay-per-view, he was honored as a St. Louis legend.

== Death ==
Muchnick died on December 30, 1998, in St. Louis. He was 93.

== Championships and accomplishments ==
- National Wrestling Alliance
  - NWA Hall of Fame (Class of 2005)
- St. Louis Wrestling Hall of Fame
  - (Class of 2007)
- Professional Wrestling Hall of Fame and Museum
  - (Class of 2003)
- Wrestling Observer Newsletter

- Wrestling Observer Newsletter Hall of Fame (Class of 1996)

== See also ==
- Roger Deem, photographer and author of St. Louis Snapshots: The Last Years of the Sam Muchnick Era
- Sam Muchnick Memorial Tournament a tribute tournament held in 1986.
