= Bruiser Brody =

American professional wrestler and homicide victim (1946–1988)

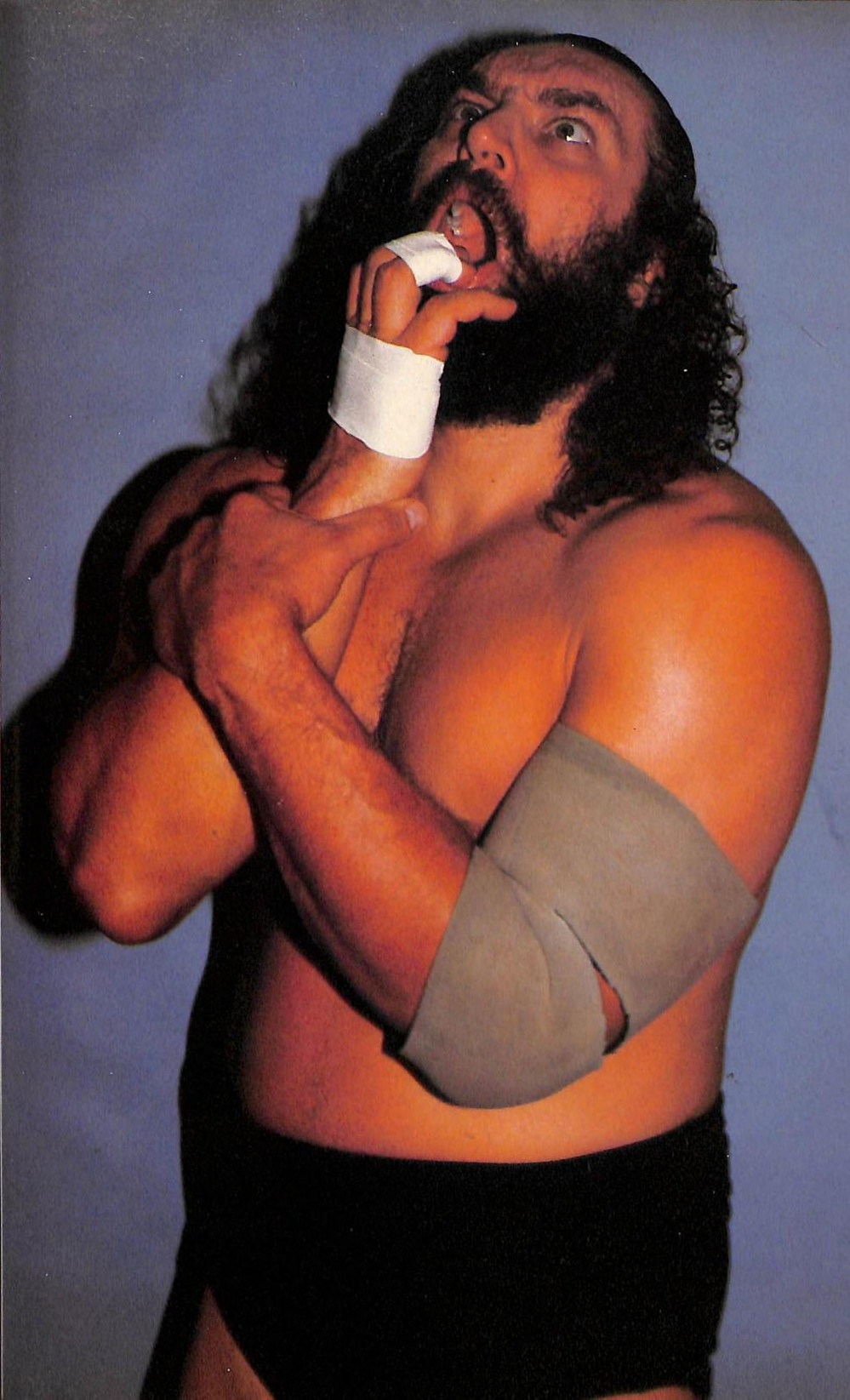
- Brody in 1986

Personal information
- Born: Frank Donald Goodish; June 18, 1946
- Died: July 17, 1988 (aged 42) Bayamón, Puerto Rico
- Cause of death: Stabbed to death by José González
- Education: West Texas State University
- Spouses: Nola Neece (m. 1968; div. 1970); Barbara Smith (m. 1972)
- Children: 1

Professional wrestling career
- Ring names: Bruiser Brody; Frank Goodish; King Kong Brody; The Masked Marauder; Frank Brody; Red River Jack
- Billed height: 6 ft 8 in (2.03 m)
- Billed weight: 300 lb (136 kg)
- Billed from: Santa Fe, New Mexico
- Trained by: Fritz Von Erich
- Debut: 1973

Frank Donald Goodish (June 18, 1946 – July 17, 1988) was an American professional wrestler who earned his greatest fame under the ring name Bruiser Brody. He also worked as King Kong Brody, the Masked Marauder, and Red River Jack. Over the years Brody became synonymous with the hardcore wrestling brawling style that often saw one or more of the participants bleeding by the time the match was over.

In his prime he worked as a "special attraction" wrestler in North America, making select appearances for various promotions such as World Class Championship Wrestling (WCCW), World Wide Wrestling Federation (WWWF), Central States Wrestling (CSW), Championship Wrestling from Florida (CWF), and the American Wrestling Association (AWA) among other events. He worked regularly in Japan for All Japan Pro Wrestling (AJPW).

Behind the scenes Brody was very protective of his "in-ring" image, hardly ever agreeing to lose matches and building a reputation of being volatile; he would on occasion intentionally hit or hurt opponents during a match contrary to the predetermined nature of professional wrestling. His in-ring work and wrestling persona earned him an induction into the professional wrestling hall of fame, St. Louis Wrestling Hall of Fame, Southern Wrestling Hall of Fame, Wrestling Observer Newsletter Hall of Fame and the WWE Hall of Fame.

Brody died in 1988 from stab wounds suffered backstage in a shower during a wrestling event in Puerto Rico. The killer was José González, better known as Invader 1. A jury acquitted González of murder, ruling that González killed Brody in self-defense. Key witnesses to the killing did not give testimony at González's trial due to their summonses only being received after the trial had concluded.

== Early life ==
Goodish was an All-State football and basketball player at Warren High School, Michigan. He played football at West Texas A&M University, then known as West Texas State, and with four teams over three seasons in the Texas Football League and Continental Football League. He also played with the Washington Redskins, from 1969-1971.

== Professional wrestling career ==
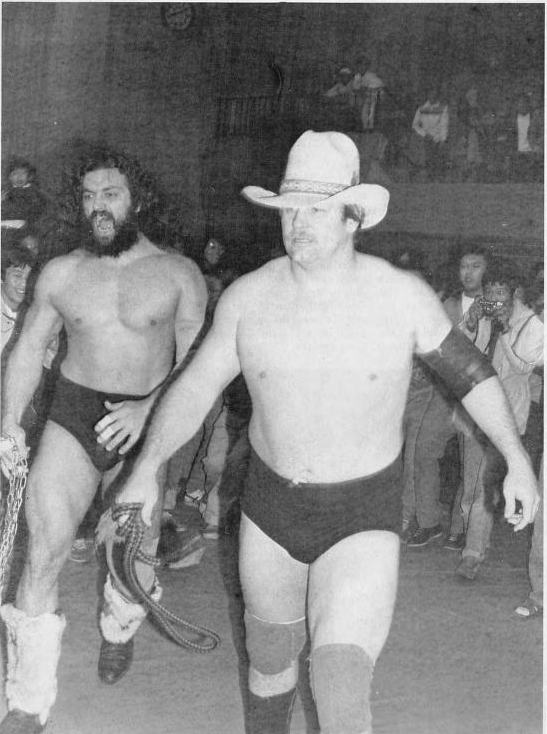
Brody (left) and Stan Hansen (right), 1983

After attending West Texas A&M and working as a sportswriter Goodish was trained to wrestle by Fritz Von Erich. He first wrestled in Dallas - Fort Worth and later Louisiana. As Bruiser Brody and King Kong Brody (the latter, a name he used in Midwestern promotions out of respect for Dick the Bruiser), Goodish competed as a freelancer in several companies including the Central States Wrestling (CSW), World Wide Wrestling Federation (WWWF), Southwest Championship Wrestling (SCW), Windy City Wrestling, World Wrestling Council (WWC), Deep South Wrestling (DSW), Championship Wrestling from Florida (CWF), American Wrestling Association (AWA), and World Class Championship Wrestling (WCCW).

In the States, he had numerous feuds with the likes of Kamala the Ugandan Giant, Abdullah the Butcher, and "Crusher" Jerry Blackwell. In Japan, he was in a tag team with Stan Hansen. Brody had a reputation for refusing to job to other wrestlers. He also competed under the moniker of Red River Jack in Texas, during an angle against Gary Hart's men and Skandor Akbar's Army in World Class Championship Wrestling.

Brody also competed as the Masked Marauder at one time in the AWA. In 1976, he went to Vince J. McMahon's WWWF where he challenged WWWF Champion Bruno Sammartino, but was unsuccessful in winning the championship. Brody also teamed with Big John Studd. It was also in the WWWF where he wrestled Invader 1 (José González), for whom he refused to sell.

In 1985, he had a very short stint with New Japan Pro-Wrestling (NJPW) in a feud with Antonio Inoki. Many of their matches ended in no contests or disqualifications. In 1987, Brody began working primarily for the World Wrestling Council in Puerto Rico after getting fired from New Japan. Brody continued his feud with Abdullah the Butcher, as well as engaging in a feud with Carlos Colon.

He briefly returned to All Japan Pro Wrestling to win his last NWA International Heavyweight Championship. On April 15, 1988, the first attempt to form what became the Triple Crown Heavyweight Championship was done when Brody faced off against NWA United National and PWF champion Genichiro Tenryu. The result was a double countout. Brody lost the title to Jumbo Tsuruta four days later.

In WCCW in Texas he was actually a babyface, most often against Abdullah The Butcher. Against Abdullah in Montreal he was a heel, managed by Floyd Creatchman. While there, Tim "Killer" Brooks acted as his brother Buster Brody. Brody was in an ongoing feud with The Russian Brute, who later went on to AWA fame with Manager Ox Baker. Due to his huge reputation in Japan, promoter Giant Baba had the match taped and later aired on Japanese TV.

In Florida he beat B. Brian Blair for the Florida State championship. Brody had an infamous cage match with Lex Luger in Florida on January 21, 1987. In the middle of the match, Brody stopped "working" and stood around. Luger and Bill Alfonso, the referee of the match, were puzzled and attempted to speak to Brody who did not respond. Luger and Alfonso decided to forgo the planned finish of the match and Alfonso disqualified Luger in a spot where Luger shoved Alfonso to the ground.

After the match, Luger recalls asking Brody if he did anything wrong to upset him, to which Brody responded "no". Brody's reasons for not working were not very clear, stating that "the match just wasn't working". In Larry Matysik's book, Wrestling at the Chase, Matysik states that before the match Brody told him "I'm not putting up with any of his bullshit" and that Brody was upset that Luger would not sell for him. However, when watching the match, it is clear that Luger did sell for Brody. In a later shoot interview, Bill Alfonso said that there was a miscommunication issue on who would lead the match and there was no ill will ever between the two.

Another scenario was that Brody was upset with the promoters over his paychecks, and decided to embarrass the promotion by being uncooperative in the match. Brody had a contentious history with wrestling promoters for much of his career. In 1987, he returned to the AWA where he fought Greg Gagne and Jerry Blackwell. Despite his reputation as being disagreeable with promoters, he would aid any who needed a boost in ticket sales as he was guaranteed to bring in crowds. While working for WCCW in Texas, he was the booker and produced their TV program.

== Personal life ==
Prior to his wrestling career, Goodish worked as a sportswriter in San Antonio, Texas. Goodish was married on June 4, 1968, to Nola Marie Neece. The marriage ended in divorce on October 12, 1970.

Goodish's second wife, New Zealander Barbara Smith, remained with him until his death in 1988. She has stated that while his wrestling persona was known for brutality and being uncontrollable, Brody was the complete opposite with his family. Brody and Smith lived in Texas. Together they had a son named Geoffrey Dean, born November 7, 1980.

== Death ==
On July 16, 1988, Brody was in the locker room before his scheduled match with Dan Spivey at Juan Ramón Loubriel Stadium in Bayamón, Puerto Rico, when José Huertas González, a fellow wrestler and booker, allegedly asked him to step into the shower area to discuss business. There was an argument between the two wrestlers and a scuffle ensued. Due to the dressing room layout, there were no witnesses to the altercation; however, two screams loud enough for the entire locker room to hear were heard. Tony Atlas ran to the shower and saw Brody bent over and holding his stomach. Atlas then looked up at González and saw him holding a bloody knife.

Due to the heavy traffic outdoors and large crowd in the stadium, it took paramedics almost an hour to reach Brody. When the they arrived, Atlas helped carry Brody downstairs to the waiting ambulance as, due to Brody's size, the paramedics were unable to lift him. He later died from his stab wounds in the hospital.

González claimed self-defense and testified in his own defense at trial in 1989. The prosecution witnesses living outside of Puerto Rico claimed they had not received their summons until after the trial had ended. The case was not dismissed for their absence, nor were they charged with contempt of the Puerto Rico court. González was acquitted of murder. The prosecution did not appeal.

Fellow wrestlers Dutch Mantel and Tony Atlas have said in a lengthy interview featured in Vice documentary series Dark Side of the Ring season 1 episode 3 entitled "The Killing of Bruiser Brody" that in the 1970s, when Brody and González had wrestled each other, Brody had wrestled very roughly and beat up González. S. D. Jones claims after one such match González said to him "one day I am gonna kill that man".

Tony Atlas also said the local police were uninformed, and thought the killer was an angry wrestling fan gone berserk. Atlas also claims that he was the only witness to point out González to the authorities, so they could arrest him. In the same documentary, according to Atlas, Bruiser Brody was about to gain ownership in the wrestling company, even promising him "you are going to see a lot of changes", implying that González might eventually be fired.

Atlas recalls González, Victor Jovica, and Carlos Colón were having an urgent meeting in the locker room only moments prior to the tragic events, while Mantel said the meeting seemed "strange". Shortly after, González called out Brody in the shower — "can I talk to you for a minute please" — then the stabbing ensued. Ultimately, the murder weapon has never been found, González aka Invader was acquitted in Puerto Rico for acting under self-defense. Bruiser Brody's widow Barbara Goodish told the reporters "I know the attacker did it, from what I hear about it the whole court case was a sham". Vice producers for Dark Side of the Ring say they contacted González and Colón, but that both "declined to be interviewed".

== Championships and accomplishments ==
- All Japan Pro Wrestling
  - NWA International Heavyweight Championship (3 times)
  - PWF World Tag Team Championship (1 time) – with Stan Hansen
  - World's Strongest Tag Determination League (1981) – with Jimmy Snuka
  - World's Strongest Tag Determination League (1983) – with Stan Hansen
  - January 3 Korakuen Hall Heavyweight Battle Royal (1979)
  - Champion Carnival Fighting Spirit Award (1981)
  - World's Strongest Tag Determined League Exciting Award (1982) – with Stan Hansen
- Cauliflower Alley Club
  - Posthumous Award (2015)
- Central States Wrestling
  - NWA Central States Heavyweight Championship (1 time)
  - NWA Central States Tag Team Championship (1 time) – with Ernie Ladd
- Championship Wrestling from Florida
  - NWA Florida Heavyweight Championship (1 time)
- George Tragos/Lou Thesz Professional Wrestling Hall of Fame
  - Frank Gotch Award (2018)
- National Wrestling Federation
  - NWF International Championship (1 time)
- NWA Big Time Wrestling/World Class Wrestling Association
  - NWA American Heavyweight Championship (4 times)
  - NWA American Tag Team Championship (3 times) – with Kerry Von Erich
  - NWA Brass Knuckles Championship (Texas version) (8 times)
  - NWA Texas Heavyweight Championship (1 time)
  - NWA Texas Tag Team Championship (3 times) – with Mike York (1), Gino Hernandez (1), and Kerry Von Erich (1)
  - WCWA Television Championship (1 time)
- NWA Tri-State
  - NWA United States Tag Team Championship (Tri-State version) (2 time) – with Stan Hansen
- Professional Wrestling Hall of Fame
  - Class of 2014
- Pro Wrestling Illustrated
  - Editor's Award (1988) tied with Adrian Adonis
  - Ranked No. 14 of the 500 top wrestlers of the "PWI Years" in 2003
- Southwest Championship Wrestling
  - SCW Southwest Brass Knuckles Championship (1 time)
  - SCW World Tag Team Championship (1 time) – with Dick Slater
- St. Louis Wrestling Hall of Fame
  - Class of 2007
- Southern Wrestling Hall of Fame
  - Class of 2013
- Tokyo Sports
  - Lifetime Achievement Award (1988)
- Western States Sports
  - NWA Western States Heavyweight Championship (1 time)
- World Championship Wrestling (Australia)
  - World Brass Knuckles Championship (1 time)
- World Wrestling Association
  - WWA World Heavyweight Championship (1 time)
- WWE
  - WWE Hall of Fame (Class of 2019) Legacy Inductee
- Wrestling Observer Newsletter
  - Best Brawler (1980–1984, 1987, 1988)
  - Wrestling Observer Newsletter Hall of Fame (Class of 1996)

== See also ==
- List of premature professional wrestling deaths
- "The Killing of Bruiser Brody"
- The Iron Claw (film) (2023 film, in which Brody is depicted by Actor Cazzey Louis Cereghino)
- "The Ballad of Bruiser Brody" (2024 BBC series, part of their Sport's Strangest Crimes series)
