= James C. Melby =

American professional wrestling historian

James C. Melby (1949-February 11, 2007) was an American professional wrestling historian and magazine editor, publishing almost 100 wrestling projects since 1991.

== Career ==
Melby's first publication was Matmania which he started aged 15 in his home state of Minnesota, and later joined Kietzer Publishing as an editor of numerous wrestling magazines including The Wrestling News, Wrestling Revue, Wrestling Monthly and The Ring's Wrestling Magazine. He was also co-editor with Norman Kietzer of Major League Wrestling Programs, which was produced for nearly every major promotion including the American Wrestling Association, World Wrestling Federation, National Wrestling Alliance, World Wrestling Association, and numerous independent promotions. He would also edit the Pro Wrestling Report publication of AWA founder Verne Gagne.

Melby also published wrestling profiles under a Wrestling Facts banner, which were career retrospective booklets featuring many early stars such as Gagne, Bronko Nagurski, Red Bastien, Dr. Bill Miller, Whipper Billy Watson, Rikidozan and numerous others.

Aside from periodicals, Melby also wrote two books. First was Mat Wars! in 1985, written with Gagne, profiling the AWA's roster and stars of the period. His second was Gopherland Grappling: The Early Years, a pictorial book showcasing Minnesota wrestling history, came twenty-one years later in 2006, and featured photographs he had taken over the years. The book was planned as the first of two due to the amount of material Melby has amassed.

Melby's later work included contributing to the newsletters of the Cauliflower Alley Club, of which he was Photographical Librarian, and continued to write for Wrestling Revue. Outside of wrestling, he also published articles about music and architecture.

In 2006 the Iowa-based George Tragos/Lou Thesz Hall of Fame honored Melby with an award in his name. Melby was at the ceremony and was unaware of an award honoring wrestling historians, or that he would not only receive the inaugural awarding but that it would be called the James C. Melby Award.

== Personal life ==
His personal life included a battle with diabetes since 1971, which resulted in a kidney transplant and the amputation of both legs. Melby was married twice, both ending in divorce.

Melby was found dead beside his bed on February 11, 2007, and is survived by his mother June, daughter Michelle and son-in-law Chad. He had corresponded with friends online the night before his death.

== Awards and accomplishments ==
- George Tragos/Lou Thesz Professional Wrestling Hall of Fame
  - James C. Melby Award (2006)
