= 友哉 =

友哉, meaning “friend, how (interrogative particle)”, is a masculine name, may refer to:

- Tomoya, Japanese masculine given name
- Yūya, Japanese masculine given name
