= Takashi Ishikawa =

Japanese professional wrestler (born 1953)

Ōnoumi Takashi
Personal information
- Native name: 大ノ海 敬士
- Born: Takashi Ishikawa; February 5, 1953 (age 73) Yamagata, Japan
- Height: 1.80 m (5 ft 11 in)
- Weight: 120 kg (265 lb)

Sport
- Sport: Sumo
- Retired: July, 1977
- Heya: Hanakago
- Record: 98-79-0
- Debut: March, 1975
- Highest rank: Maegashira 4 (March, 1977)
- Championships: 1 (Makushita)
- Updated on December 2007

Takashi Ishikawa (石川 孝志, Ishikawa Takashi; ring names: 石川 敬士 and 石川 泰士, born February 5, 1953) is a Japanese former professional wrestler and sumo wrestler from Fujishima, Higashitagawa District, Yamagata Prefecture, Japan.

== Sumo wrestling career ==
He played baseball up to junior high school, but at Sakata Minami High School he switched to sumo and won the high school section of the National Sports Festival. He was an amateur sumo champion while at Nihon University, winning the All Japan Sumo Championships and the amateur yokozuna title. From 1975 to 1977 he was a sumo wrestler with the Hanakago stable and used the fighting name of Ōnoumi Takashi (大ノ海 敬士), which had also been his stablemaster's fighting name. He reached a highest rank of maegashira 4, but was forced to retire at the age of 24 after complications with diabetes.

== Professional wrestling career ==
=== All Japan Pro Wrestling (1977–1988) ===
After retiring from sumo, Ishikawa decided to become a professional wrestler and joined All Japan Pro Wrestling. Giant Baba sent him to Pat O'Connor for training. After training, he was sent to the Funks' territory in Amarillo, Texas, where he debuted on November 8, 1977, under the name Takashi Onome. In January 1978, he was sent to Kansas City for Central States Wrestling.

Returning to Japan in November 1978, Ishikawa wrestled a tour with International Wrestling Enterprise, before returning to AJPW in December 1978. In October 1979, he was sent abroad to Puerto Rico for World Wrestling Council. Under the name Mitsu Ishikawa, he won his first championship, the WWC North American Tag Team Championship with Haru Sonoda. In March 1980, he would briefly return to Amarillo and won the NWA Western States Tag Team Championship with Hugo Savinovich, before Savinovich left the area and was replaced by Sonoda, making Ishikawa a two-time champion.

In May 1980, Ishikawa would return to AJPW full-time. He would win five AJPW All Asia Tag Team Championships, twice with Akio Sato, once with Ashura Hara, and twice with Mighty Inoue, before retiring in December 1988. His last match with AJPW was held on December 16, teaming with Mighty Inoue in a victory over Motoshi Okuma and Haruka Eigen.

=== Super World Sports (1990–1992) ===
After a hiatus, Ishikawa returned to pro wrestling in September 1990 for Super World Sports, where he was part of Genichiro Tenryu's Revolution stable and was the booker for the promotion. He would also wrestle with stars in the World Wrestling Federation. Unfortunately in June 1992, SWS collapsed.

=== WAR (1992–1994) ===
After SWS's collapse, Ishikawa joined Tenryu in forming WAR. Soon after, the promotion was engaged in an inter-promotional war with New Japan Pro-Wrestling. At NJPW's Fantastic Story at Tokyo Dome on January 4, 1993, he lost to Tatsumi Fujinami. He would remain with WAR until September 1994. His last match with the promotion was on September 1, defeating Yamato.

=== Tokyo Pro Wrestling (1994–1998) ===
In December 1994, he formed Tokyo Pro Wrestling. While wrestling and running TPW, he would also make overtures to Big Japan Pro Wrestling, Frontier Martial Arts Wrestling, Social Progress Wrestling Federation, Independent Wrestling Union, WAR, NJPW, and IWA Japan. In April 1996, he would win the TPW Tag Team Championship with Yoji Anjo. In June 1997, he would win the BJW Tag Team Championship with Kengo Kimura. Although he retired from active competition on January 19, 1998, he did wrestle a few matches for BJW in January 1999.

== Championship and accomplishments ==
- All Japan Pro Wrestling
  - AJPW All Asia Tag Team Championship (5 times) - with Akio Sato (2 times), Ashura Hara (1 time) and Mighty Inoue (2 times)
- Big Japan Pro Wrestling
  - BJW Tag Team Championship (1 time, inaugural) - with Kengo Kimura
- Tokyo Sports
  - Service Award (1989)
- Tokyo Pro Wrestling
  - TWA Tag Team Championship - with Yoji Anjo (1 time)
- Western States Sports
  - NWA Western States Tag Team Championship (2 times) - with Hugo Savinovich (1 time) and Haru Sonoda (1 time)
- World Wrestling Council
  - WWC North American Tag Team Championship (1 time) - with Haru Sonoda

== Sumo career record ==
Ōnoumi Takashi
Year	January Hatsu basho, Tokyo	March Haru basho, Osaka	May Natsu basho, Tokyo	July Nagoya basho, Nagoya	September Aki basho, Tokyo	November Kyūshū basho, Fukuoka
1975	x	Makushita tsukedashi #60; 6–1	West Makushita #29; 6–1	West Makushita #12; 7–0; Champion	East Jūryō #12; 6–9	West Makushita #2; 3–4
1976	West Makushita #7; 5–2	East Makushita #3; 5–2	West Jūryō #13; 9–6	East Jūryō #8; 8–7	West Jūryō #7; 9–6	West Jūryō #1; 9–6
1977	East Maegashira #12; 9–6	West Maegashira #4; 4–11	West Maegashira #11; 5–10	West Jūryō #2; Retired; 7–8	x	x
Record given as wins–losses–absences Top division champion Top division runner-up Retired Lower divisions Non-participation Sanshō key: F=Fighting spirit; O=Outstanding performance; T=Technique Also shown: ★=Kinboshi; P=Playoff(s); Divisions: Makuuchi — Jūryō — Makushita — Sandanme — Jonidan — Jonokuchi Makuuchi ranks: Yokozuna — Ōzeki — Sekiwake — Komusubi — Maegashira
