= Tank Morgan =

American professional wrestler (1933–1991)

Personal information
- Born: Paul McManus; April 18, 1933 Georgia, United States
- Died: August 15, 1991 (aged 58) Las Vegas, Nevada, United States
- Cause of death: Murdered by gunshot

Professional wrestling career
- Ring name(s): Tank Morgan; Bob Morgan
- Billed height: 6 ft 2 in (188 cm)
- Billed weight: 295 lb (134 kg)
- Debut: 1950s
- Retired: 1974

Paul McManus (April 18, 1933 – August 15, 1991) was an American professional wrestler known as Tank Morgan. He worked for the World Wide Wrestling Federation from 1966 to 1967.

== Professional wrestling career ==
Morgan would make his professional wrestling debut sometime in the 1950s. He would work in various territories in the States. In 1965, he made his debut for the American Wrestling Association in Minnesota as Bob Morgan.

In 1966, he made his debut in New York City for the World Wide Wrestling Federation as Tank Morgan. He would have a feud with WWWF Champion Bruno Sammartino in late 1966 and early 1967. On December 12, 1966, Morgan fought Bruno Sammartino to a best of two out of three falls match at Madison Square Gardens. Morgan won the first, while Sammartino won the other two and retained the title. In 1967, Morgan had feuds with Ox Baker, Arman Hussian and Tony Parisi.

After leaving the WWWF in 1967, Morgan worked in Hawaii, Florida and the Mid-Atlantic.

In 1969, he worked in Japan for International Wrestling Enterprise. He wrestled in the promotion's first ever hair vs hair match teaming with Dory Dixon against Rusher Kimura and Thunder Sugiyama. Kimura and Sugiyama won the match forcing Morgan to shave his head.

Later in his career he returned to Hawaii, and worked in Florida and Georgia.

On November 12, 1973, he defeated Dewey Robertson in a tournament final for the NWA Tri-State North American Championship. This was his only title. He dropped the title to Rip Tyler on February 4, 1974. Later that year he retired.

== Death ==
On August 15, 1991, Morgan was walking his dog when a car went by and shot him in front of a high school in Las Vegas, Nevada. A police officer found his body and taken the University Medical Center where he was pronounced dead. He was 58 years old. He was believed to have been a victim of mistaken identity.

== Championships and accomplishments ==
- Mid-South Wrestling
  - Mid-South North American Heavyweight Championship (Tri-State version) (1 time)
