= Strong Kobayashi =

Japanese professional wrestler (1940–2021)

- ストロング小林
- Born: Shozo Kobayashi; 25 December 1940; Hongō, Tokyo, Japan
- Died: 31 December 2021 (aged 81); Ōme, Tokyo, Japan
- Other name: Strong Kongô
- Occupations: Professional wrestler, actor, railway worker Professional wrestling career
- Ring name(s): Fukumen Taro; The Korean Assassin; Shozo Kobayashi; Strong Kobayashi
- Billed height: 187 cm (6 ft 2 in)
- Billed weight: 125 kg (276 lb)
- Billed from: "Korea" (as The Korean Assassin)
- Trained by: Isao Yoshiwara; Matty Suzuki
- Debut: 21 July 1967
- Retired: 1 March 1992

Shozo "Strong" Kobayashi (Japanese: ストロング小林, 25 December 1940 – 31 December 2021), also known by the stage name Strong Kongô, was a Japanese professional wrestler and actor. He is known for his appearances with International Wrestling Enterprise and New Japan Pro-Wrestling, as well as his appearances on television series including Choudenshi Bioman and Takeshi's Castle.

== Early life ==
Born in Hongō, Tokyo, at the age of three Kobayashi's family was evacuated to Ōme, Tokyo, as a result of World War II. As a youth he participated in weight training and bodybuilding, training at the Korakuen Gym. After leaving high school, Kobayashi worked for Japanese National Railways at Inagi-Naganuma Station until being spotted at a bodybuilding event and recruited as a professional wrestler in 1966 at the age of 25.

== Professional wrestling career ==
Kobayashi trained as a professional wrestler under Isao Yoshiwara and Matty Suzuki at the International Wrestling Enterprise Dojo. He made his debut on 21 July 1967 at the age of 26 for International Wrestling Enterprise, wrestling under a mask as "Fukumen Taro" ("Masked Taro"); he was reportedly the first ever Japanese professional wrestler to perform under a mask. In 1968, he unmasked and began wrestling under his real name.

Kobayashi made his first foray out of Japan in November 1968, travelling to Aberdeen, Scotland to wrestle for Relwyskow & Green Promotions. In 1969, he travelled to Germany, where he performed for Internationaler Berufsringkämpfer-Verband. He won his first title in May 1969, teaming with Toyonobori to defeat Ivan Strogoff and Jean Ferré in the Élysée Montmartre in Paris, France to become the inaugural IWA World Tag Team Champions (the titles were vacated in January 1970). In July 1969, Kobayashi returned to Japan, where he tweaked his ring name to "Strong Kobayashi". On January 1, 1970, in Oita, he pinned Monster Roussimoff, who later became known as Andre the Giant. This would not be his only pinfall victory over Andre.

In November 1970, Kobayashi travelled to the United States where he began wrestling for the American Wrestling Association (AWA). In June 1971, he defeated Dr. Bill Miller in Duluth, Minnesota to win the IWA World Heavyweight Championship. Later that month, he lost a loser leaves town match to The Crusher, subsequently returning to Japan and International Wrestling Enterprise.

Over the following two-and-a-half years, Kobayashi defended the IWA World Heavyweight Championship against a series of various challengers including Blackjack Lanza, Red Bastien, Baron von Raschke, Dusty Rhodes, Crusher Lisowski, Curtis Iaukea, Billy Robinson, Édouard Carpentier, Ivan Koloff, Dick Murdoch, Mad Dog Vachon, and Rusher Kimura. On May 6, 1972, he pinned Andre the Giant again in the fourth IWA World Series Final in Morioka, Japan. In July 1972, Kobayashi and Great Kusatsu won the vacant IWA World Tag Team Championship; they held the titles until April 1973 when they lost to Koloff and Vachon. Kobayashi's reign as IWA World Heavyweight Champion ended in November 1973 when he lost to Wahoo McDaniel; he defeated McDaniel in a rematch later that month to regain the title. Kobayashi began 1974 with a pair of successful title defences against Bill Watts. He abruptly left International Wrestling Enterprise in February 1974, vacating the IWA World Heavyweight Championship.

Kobayashi made his debut with the nascent New Japan Pro-Wrestling promotion in March 1974, challenging NWF Heavyweight Champion Antonio Inoki in a historic match held at Kuramae Kokugikan that was billed as "the Duel on Ganryū-jima"; Inoki won the contest with a German suplex. The bout drew a live audience of 16,500 and over a 20% Japanese television share. and was named match of the year by Tokyo Sports. The match was significant as hitherto top Japanese professional wrestlers traditionally only faced foreign opponents, not one another, leading it to be described as a "forbidden battle".

Following his bout with Inoki, Kobayashi returned to the United States in June 1974, wrestling for Championship Wrestling from Florida under a mask as "The Korean Assassin". During his time in Florida, he was managed by Gary Hart and was part of Hart's villainous "Gary Hart's Army" faction. On July 15, 1974, Kobayashi lost to Mike Graham in a bout in which both Graham's beard and Hart's beard were on the line. On July 23, Kobayashi was unmasked after losing to The Bounty Hunter. On July 24, Kobayashi lost to NWA North American Heavyweight Champion Bob Armstrong in a "title versus hair" match. Kobayashi left Florida later that month after he and Bobby Duncum lost a tag team loser leaves town match to Don Muraco and Jerry Brisco. In August 1974, Kobayashi began wrestling for the World Wide Wrestling Federation, where his opponents included André the Giant, Pedro Morales, Chief Jay Strongbow, Victor Rivera, Larry Zbyszko, Tony Garea, and WWWF Heavyweight Champion Bruno Sammartino; during his tenure, he occasionally teamed with Killer Kowalski. He left the WWWF in November 1974 to return to Japan.

Kobayashi returned to New Japan Pro-Wrestling in December 1974, unsuccessfully challenging Inoki for a second time in the Kuramae Kokugikan. He wrestled for NJPW throughout 1975, competing primarily against foreign opponents such as The Canadian Wildman, Steve Veidor, Killer Karl Krupp, Man Mountain Mike, The Hollywood Blonds, Hans Schmidt, Brute Bernard, Gilles Poisson, Greg Valentine, and Tiger Jeet Singh. In May 1975, Kobayashi competed in the annual World League Tournament, losing to Inoki in the semi-finals. In February 1976, Kobayashi and Seiji Sakaguchi defeated Singh and Voodoo Malumba in the finals of a tournament for the vacant NWA North American Tag Team Championship. They held the titles for close to a year, losing to Singh and Umanosuke Ueda in February 1977. In October 1976, Kobayashi and Sakaguchi defeated Singh and Gama Singh in the finals of the Asia Tag Team League to be crowned the inaugural Asia Tag Team Champions. In July 1977, Kobayashi and Sakaguchi defeated Singh and Ueda to regain the NWA North American Tag Team Championship; in the same month, they lost the Asia Tag Team Championship to Singh and Ueda. Their second reign as NWA North American Tag Team Champions lasted until April 1979 when they lost to Hiro Matsuda and Masa Saito.

In April 1978, Kobayashi returned to the World Wide Wrestling Federation. During his run, he unsuccessfully challenged WWWF Heavyweight Champion Bob Backlund and WWWF World Tag Team Champions Dino Bravo and Dominic DeNucci. Kobayashi left the WWWF in June 1978, returning to NJPW. In 1978 and 1980, he made brief returns to International Wrestling Enterprise, holding the IWA World Tag Team Championship a third time.

In February 1981, Kobayashi began wrestling for the Universal Wrestling Association in Estado de Mexico, Mexico. In March 1981, he unsuccessfully challenged Canek for the UWA World Heavyweight Championship. In June 1981, Kobayashi returned to the World Wide Wrestling Federation (since renamed the World Wrestling Federation) for a third and final run, where his opponents include Don Muraco, Rick Martel, S. D. Jones, Johnny Rodz, Baron Mikel Scicluna and a rookie Curt Hennig. In August 1981, Kobayashi returned to NJPW, facing opponents such as Abdullah the Butcher, Bad News Allen, Billy Crusher, Hulk Hogan, and Stan Hansen.

Kobayashi largely retired from professional wrestling in October 1981 due to a back injury. In his final bout before entering semi-retirement, he teamed with Yoshiaki Fujiwara to face Murdoch and Hogan.

Kobayashi made a one-night return to the ring in 1984 for the Universal Wrestling Association in Mexico, teaming with Buffalo Allen and Scorpio to face Robinson, Kuniaki Kobayashi, and Lou Thesz in a six-man tag team match. He formally announced his retirement on 26 August 1984. He wrestled his last ever match at New Japan Pro-Wrestling's twentieth anniversary show on 1 March 1992, teaming with Sakaguchi to defeat Singh and Ueda.

== Acting career ==
After largely stepping back from wrestling in 1981, Kobayashi worked as a television and film actor under the stage name "Strong Kongô" until retiring in 1995. His roles included appearaing as a henchman on the gameshow Takeshi's Castle from 1986 to 1989.

=== Filmography ===
Film roles
| Year | Title | Role | Notes |
|---|---|---|---|
| 1982 | Death of a Ninja | Kongôbô | |
| 1983 | Kanei Command Performance | Sekiguchi Yataemon | Television film |
| 1983 | Detective Story | Wada | |
| 1983 | Kabamaru the Ninja Boy | | |
| 1985 | Yabanjin No Youni | | |
| 1987 | The Kôsuke Kindaichi Series 6: The Perfume and Suicide | Ichisuke | Television film |
| 1987 | Guys Who Never Learn | Suzume | |
| 1988 | Dokushin Apa-to: Dokudami-sou | Iron | |
| 1989 | Fainaru Faito - Saigo no Ichigeki | Free Fighter #1 | |

Television roles
| Year | Title | Role | Notes |
|---|---|---|---|
| 1983 | Kagaku Sentai Dynaman | Jinzô Ningen Gon | Episode: "Seeking a New Finishing Move" |
| 1984–1985 | Choudenshi Bioman | Monster | 49 episodes |
| 1985 | Yûyake Nyan Nyan | | |
| 1986–1989 | Takeshi's Castle | Strong Kongô | |
| 1989 | Katte ni Shiyagare Hey! Brother | | |
| 1990 | Rinrin To | | |
| 1991 | Taiheiki | Big Man | |
| 1994 | Hana no Ran | Aka Oni | |
| 1995 | Hachidai Shôgun Yôshimune | Geinin | |

== Professional wrestling style and persona ==
Kobayashi wrestled in a "powerhouse" style. His finishing move was the Canadian backbreaker rack; his signature moves included the atomic drop, brainbuster, bear hug, and diving body press. He was nicknamed "Dotō no Kairiki" ("Raging Super Power").

== Personal life and death ==
In later life, Kobayashi lived in a specialist nursing home in Ōme after becoming bedridden due to a spinal cord injury that paralyzed his lower body. He died from lung disease on 31 December 2021 6 days after his 81st birthday in Ōme. Following his death, Antonio Inoki expressed his commiserations, calling their 1974 bout the best match of his career.

== Championships and accomplishments ==
- International Wrestling Enterprise
  - IWA World Heavyweight Championship (2 times)
  - IWA World Tag Team Championship (3 times) - with Great Kusatsu (1 time), Haruka Eigen (1 time), and Toyonobori (1 time)
- New Japan Pro-Wrestling
  - Asia Tag Team Championship (1 time) - with Seiji Sakaguchi
  - NWA North American Tag Team Championship (2 times) - with Seiji Sakaguchi
- Tokyo Sports Puroresu Awards
  - Match of the Year Award (1974) - vs. Antonio Inoki (March 19)
  - Fighting Spirit Award (1974)
  - Best Tag Team Award (1976) - with Seiji Sakaguchi
