= Rusher Kimura =

Japanese professional wrestler and rikishi

Personal information
- Born: Masao Kimura June 30, 1941 Nakagawa, Nakagawa District, Hokkaidō, Japan
- Died: May 24, 2010 (aged 68)

Professional wrestling career
- Ring name(s): Masao Kimura; Mr. Toyo; Rusher Kimura
- Billed height: 6 ft 1 in (1.85 m)
- Billed weight: 275 lb (125 kg)
- Trained by: Toyonobori; Billy Robinson
- Debut: April 2, 1965
- Retired: July 10, 2004

Masao Kimura (木村 政雄, Kimura Masao; June 30, 1941 – May 24, 2010) was a Japanese professional wrestler, best known by his ring name Rusher Kimura (ラッシャー木村, Rasshā Kimura). He was a five-time IWA World Heavyweight Champion, making him a five-time world champion.

== Sumo wrestling career ==
He was a sumo wrestler under the shikona Kinomura, a direct modification of his surname. He began his career at the May 1958 Grand Sumo tournament and he had a career high rank of Makushita 20 east. He had taken up sumo to build his body for Western-style professional wrestling, thus by 1964 he decided to quit, considering that it would be harder to do so the higher up the divisions he went. He experienced back to back losing Bashos before his retirement, posting consecutive 1-6 records in July and September 1964 in Makushita, sumo's third division.

== Professional wrestling career ==
=== Japan Pro Wrestling Alliance (1965–1966) ===
He debuted in 1965 in the old Japan Pro Wrestling Alliance against Sarukichi Takasakiyama (long-time jobber Motoyuki Kitazawa, later known as Shoji Kai in New Japan Pro-Wrestling). As a protégé of Toyonobori, Kimura followed him when he left due to backstage struggles.

=== Original Tokyo Pro Wrestling (1966–1967) ===
Toyonobori, Isao Yoshiwara, Kimura, Antonio Inoki, Hiro Matsuda, Masa Saito and others formed Tokyo Pro Wrestling. Kimura did not compete much in the upper cards, but in the lower cards he served as debut opponent for future rival, Haruka Eigen, with whom he would have the longest-running fixture in puroresu from 1981 to 2003. Their last match until then happened on January 31, 1967, a win by Kimura.

When Tokyo Pro Wrestling closed down, Kimura joined Toyonobori and Yoshiwara in creating yet another larger promotion.

=== International Wrestling Enterprise (1967–1981) ===
On April 20, 1968, "Rusher" Kimura won his first major title by teaming with Thunder Sugiyama to win the TWWA (Trans World Wrestling Alliance) World Tag Team Championship from Stan Stasiak and Tank Morgan. They vacated the titles in the fall of that year to give way to the new IWA (International Wrestling Alliance) title governing body. On September 23, 1971, Kimura and Sugiyama won the new IWA World Tag Team Championship by defeating Red Bastien and Bill Howard; they vacated the titles in May 1972, when Kimura left for tours abroad.

Kimura showed up in the NWA's Central States and Georgia territories in 1969–70 as Masao Kimura and in the American Wrestling Association as Great Kimura. This was the only time he actually competed in the AWA; his future challenges for AWA titles all happened in IWE in Japan. In 1972, he showed up in Europe, specifically Germany's Verband Der Berufsringer, under his real name.

On October 8, 1970, Kimura defeated Dr. Death (Moose Morowski under a mask) to win the first cage match in Japan. The match, broadcast on IWE's at the time outlet Tokyo Broadcasting System, earned Kimura a reputation and the nickname Kana-ami no Oni (金網の鬼, "Demon of the Steel Cage"). His opponents in cage matches included Ox Baker, Angelo Poffo, Gilles Poisson, King Curtis Iaukea, Baron Mikel Scicluna, Killer Buddy Austin, Lars Anderson, Ole Anderson, Skandor Akbar, The Brute, Rene Goulet, Baron von Raschke, Ray Stevens, Killer Tor Kamata, Butcher Brannigan, Ripper Collins and a rookie Ric Flair.

Though TBS later banned cage matches from airing, Kimura was on the way to becoming a superstar. His last tag team title in IWE was earned on May 14, 1973, when he teamed with Great Kusatsu to defeat Mad Dog Vachon and Ivan Koloff for the IWA World Tag Team Championship. It was the beginning of Kimura's golden years. On October 10, 1974, he defeated Blackjack Mulligan to win the IWA World Series for the first time.

Kimura won his first of five IWA World Heavyweight Championships on April 19, 1975, defeating Vachon. He would go on to defeat the Undertaker (Hans Schroeder, not Mark Calaway), Super Assassin (Roger Smith), Umanosuke Ueda, Alexis Smirnoff and Verne Gagne for his other titles. Prominent challengers during his six years at the top of IWE included Baker, Kamata, Big John Quinn, Gypsy Joe, Pierre Martin, Crazy Sailor White, Wild Angus Campbell, Gil Hayes, Rip Tyler, Mighty Inoue, Cowboy Bob Ellis, Killer Tim Brooks, Superstar Billy Graham, John Tolos, André the Giant, Jos LeDuc, The Mongolian Stomper, Killer Karl Krupp, Johnny Powers, Mike George, Randy Tyler, Ron Bass, Ray Candy and Steve Olsonoski.

Kimura also won the Japan International League by defeating Professor Tanaka in the final on November 30, 1978.

On October 25, 1979, Kimura challenged Nick Bockwinkel to a double title match for the AWA World Heavyweight Championship with Lou Thesz as the special referee. Being held in a Boston crab by Kimura, Bockwinkel pushed Thesz out of the ring while trying to reach the ropes and was disqualified.

Kimura's last known IWA title defense was against Enforcer Luciano on August 6, 1981 in Muroran, Hokkaido. The IWE promotion closed on September 30.

=== New Japan Pro-Wrestling (1981–1984) ===
Kimura, Animal Hamaguchi and Isamu Teranishi joined New Japan as an IWE "invading" stable and immediately targeted Inoki, who had given up his NWF Heavyweight Championship earlier in the year. In the subsequent match between former heavyweight champions on October 8, 1981, Inoki beat Kimura by disqualification.

Kimura teamed with Haruka Eigen since 1973, a New Japan loyalist, for a tag team match against foreigners Roland Bock and Rene Goulet on December 7, 1981, and lost. This was the match that rekindled the rivalry between them that started back in Tokyo Pro Wrestling.

Kimura participated in the inaugural International Wrestling Grand Prix tournament as one of four Japanese entries (aside from Inoki, Akira Maeda and Killer Khan, the latter being a Japanese billed as a Mongolian per his North American persona). He finished sixth in the 10-man table. In the same year, Hamaguchi and Teranishi left him to join New Japan renegade Riki Choshu in the Ishin Gundan stable. Kimura spent the rest of his time feuding with Eigen and teaming with heels such as Bad News Allen.

In between stints in New Japan he and former IWE wrestler Ryuma Go showed up in the dying days of the Los Angeles circuit to win his last major title, the NWA Americas Tag Team Championship.

=== Universal Wrestling Federation (1984) ===
Kimura and Go followed Hisashi Shinma out of New Japan to form a new promotion, the Japanese UWF. Initially Kimura supported the circuit's concept, though he eventually followed Shinma out yet again as Satoru Sayama, who wanted to get back into puroresu through UWF after months of inactivity following his stint as the original Tiger Mask, did not want to work with Shinma. Thus, Kimura, Go and Gran Hamada joined All Japan Pro Wrestling after a few months.

In between UWF tours he showed up in Stampede Wrestling in Canada, his last North American tour. On May 5, 1984, he challenged former ally Bad News Allen for his North American Heavyweight championship, but failed.

=== All Japan Pro Wrestling (1984–2000) ===
Initially he aligned himself with other IWE wrestlers such as Mighty Inoue, Ashura Hara and Goro Tsurumi in feuding with the factions led by Giant Baba, Genichiro Tenryu, Stan Hansen and Riki Choshu. In 1989, after the Funks left All Japan, he made peace with Baba and the two men began to team, mostly in comedy tag team and six-man matches, though occasionally they got serious. During the 1989 World's Strongest Tag League, he and Baba lost to Hansen & Tenryu when Tenryu pinned Baba, the first time a Japanese wrestler had pinned Baba in All Japan. This tournament marked Kimura's last serious attempt at a title (the vacant AJPW World Tag Team Championship, eventually won by Hansen & Tenryu). Kimura teamed with Inoue for the 1990 and 1991 editions of the tag team tournament, but finished bottom of the table both times.

Kimura and Baba, mostly with Mitsuo Momota following them, continued teaming in comedy tag team matches throughout the 1990s. When Baba died in 1999, Kimura took over the leadership of the team with Momota. When Mitsuharu Misawa broke away from All Japan to form Pro Wrestling Noah, Kimura jumped to a new Japanese promotion for the seventh and final time.

=== Pro Wrestling Noah (2000–2004) ===
Kimura and Momota continued in their six-man and tag team preliminary bouts against Haruka Eigen and others.

Kimura's last match was a tag team win with Momota over Eigen and Kishin Kawabata on March 1, 2003.

== Championships and accomplishments ==
- All Japan Pro Wrestling
  - World's Strongest Tag Determination League Fighting Spirit Award (1985) – with Ashura Hara
  - World's Strongest Tag Determination League Special Award (1988) – with Giant Baba
- International Wrestling Enterprise
  - IWA World Heavyweight Championship (5 times)
  - IWA World Tag Team Championship (2 times) – with Thunder Sugiyama and Great Kusatsu
  - TWWA World Tag Team Championship (1 time) – with Thunder Sugiyama
  - IWA World Series (1973&1977)
  - Japan League (1978)
- NWA Hollywood Wrestling
  - NWA Americas Tag Team Championship (1 time) – with Mr. Go
- Tokyo Sports
  - Fighting Spirit Award (1976, 1981, 1982)
  - Lifetime Achievement Award (2010)
  - Match of the Year Award (1976) vs. Jumbo Tsuruta on March 28
  - Outstanding Performance Award (1975, 1978)
  - Popularity Award (1988)
  - Service Award (2006)
