= Yuya (disambiguation) =

Yuya was a high-ranking ancient Egyptian courtier

Yuya may also refer to:

- Yūya, a masculine Japanese given name
- Yuya (YouTuber) (born 1993), Mexican beauty vlogger and YouTuber
- Yuya, Yamaguchi, a former town in Yamaguchi Prefecture, Japan
