= IWA World Tag Team Championship (International Wrestling Enterprise) =

Details
- Promotion: International Wrestling Enterprise
- Date established: May 18, 1969
- Date retired: August 9, 1981
Statistics
- First champions: Strong Kobayashi and Toyonobori
- Final champions: Ashura Hara and Mighty Inoue
- Most reigns: Great Kusatsu (9)
- Longest reign: Great Kusatsu and Rusher Kimura (716 days)
- Shortest reign: John Quinn and Kurt Von Hess (1 day)

The International Wrestling Alliance (IWA) World Tag Team Championship was a professional wrestling tag team championship contested in the Japanese professional wrestling promotion International Wrestling Enterprise (国際プロレス興行, Kokusai Puroresu Kogyō). The IWA World Tag Team Championship was created in 1969 (replacing the TWWA World Tag Team Championship) and abandoned in 1981 upon the closure of the promotion.

== History ==
International Wrestling Enterprise (IWE) was founded in October 1966 by Isao Yoshihara and Hiro Matsuda. The Trans-World Wrestling Alliance (TWWA) was created as the governing body for IWE. In 1967, IWE created the TWWA World Tag Team Championship, with the Fabulous Kangaroos being named the inaugural champions. The TWWA World Tag Team Championship was abandoned in 1968.

In 1968, Yoshihara formed the International Wrestling Alliance (IWA) with French promoter Roger Delaporte as a new governing body for IWE. In May 1969, IWE created the IWA World Tag Team Championship. IWE mainstays Strong Kobayashi and Toyonobori became the inaugural champions on May 18, 1969, defeating the Belgian wrestler Ivan Strogoff and the French wrestler Jean Ferré (substituting for Roger Delaporte) at an event staged in the Élysée Montmartre in Paris, France.

The titles were contended until IWE folded on September 30, 1981.

== Title history ==
Key
No.	Overall reign number
Reign	Reign number for the specific team—reign numbers for the individuals are in parentheses, if different
Days	Number of days held
Defenses	Number of successful defenses
N/A	Unknown information

No.	Champion	Championship change			Reign statistics			Notes	Ref.
No.	Champion	Date	Event	Location	Reign	Days	Defenses	Notes	Ref.
1	Strong Kobayashi and Toyonobori	May 18, 1969	N/A	Paris, France	1	236	3	Kobayashi and Toyonobori defeated Ivan Strogoff and Jean Ferré to become the inaugural champions.	
—	Vacated	January 9, 1970	—	—	—	—	—	Vacated when Toyonobori retired.	
2	Michael Nador and Monster Roussimoff	January 18, 1970	New Year Challenge Series	Fukuoka, Japan	1	16	0	Nador and Roussimoff defeated Great Kusatsu and Thunder Sugiyama.	
3	Great Kusatsu and Thunder Sugiyama	February 3, 1970	AWA World Championship Series	Hiroshima, Japan	1	289	8	Two-out-of-three falls match.	
4	Bob Windham and Larry Hennig	November 19, 1970	Big Winter Series	Ashikaga, Japan	1	23	3	Two-out-of-three falls match.	
5	Great Kusatsu (2) and Thunder Sugiyama (2)	December 12, 1970	Big Winter Series	Tokyo, Japan	2	199	4	Two-out-of-three falls match.	
—	Vacated	June 29, 1971	—	—	—	—	—	Vacated when Kusatsu left for the United States.	
6	Bill Howard and Red Bastien	September 7, 1971	Dynamite Series	Tokyo, Japan	1	16	0	Bastien and Howard defeated Rusher Kimura and Thunder Sugiyama for the vacant Championship. Two-out-of-three falls match.	
7	Rusher Kimura and Thunder Sugiyama (3)	September 23, 1971	Dynamite Series	Isahaya, Japan	1	N/A	N/A	Two-out-of-three falls match.	
—	Vacated	May 1972	—	—	—	—	—	Vacated when Kimura left Japan to tour overseas.	
8	Great Kusatsu (3) and Strong Kobayashi (2)	July 7, 1972	Big Summer Series	Chiba, Japan	1	285	6	Kusatsu and Kobayashi defeated Baron Mikel Scicluna and Bill Miller for the vacant Championship. Two-out-of-three falls match.	
9	Ivan Koloff and Mad Dog Vachon	April 18, 1973	Dynamite Series	Tsuchiura, Japan	1	26	1	Two-out-of-three falls match.	
10	Great Kusatsu (4) and Rusher Kimura (2)	May 14, 1973	Dynamite Series	Funabashi, Japan	1	716	11	Two-out-of-three falls match.	
—	Vacated	April 30, 1975	—	—	—	—	—	Vacated when Rusher Kimura won the IWA World Heavyweight Championship.	
11	Great Kusatsu (5) and Mighty Inoue	June 13, 1975	Big Challenge Series	Morioka, Japan	1	143	2	Kusatsu and Inoue defeated Duke Savage and Killer Tor Kamata in the finals of a tournament for the vacant Championship. Two-out-of-three falls match.	
12	Combat (Mad Dog Martel and Pierre Martin)	November 3, 1975	Big Winter Series	Tokyo, Japan	1	29	1	Two-out-of-three falls match.	
13	Great Kusatsu (6) and Mighty Inoue (2)	December 2, 1975	Big Winter Series	Yokohama, Japan	2	188	5	Cage match.	
14	Eddie Sullivan and Rip Tyler	June 7, 1976	Big Challenge Series	Fukuyama, Japan	1	4	0		
15	Great Kusatsu (7) and Mighty Inoue (3)	June 11, 1976	Big Challenge Series	Koga, Japan	3	207	7	Two-out-of-three falls match.	
—	Vacated	January 4, 1977	—	—	—	—	—	Vacated to allow a tournament to take place.	
16	John Quinn and Kurt Von Hess	March 25, 1977	Sixth IWA World Series	Yokohama, Japan	1	1	0	Quinn and Von Hess defeated Animal Hamaguchi and Isamu Teranishi in the finals of a tournament for the vacant Championship.	
17	Animal Hamaguchi and Great Kusatsu (8)	March 26, 1977	Sixth IWA World Series	Tokyo, Japan	1	285	2	Two-out-of-three falls match.	
18	The Samoans (Afa and Sika)	January 5, 1978	New Year Pioneer Series	Osaka, Japan	1	15	0		
19	Animal Hamaguchi (2) and Great Kusatsu (9)	January 20, 1978	New Year Pioneer Series	Tokyo, Japan	2	366	4		
20	Yamaha Brothers (Kantaro Hoshino and Kotetsu Yamamoto)	January 21, 1979	New Year Pioneer Series	Tokyo, Japan	1	33	1	Two-out-of-three falls match.	
21	Animal Hamaguchi (3) and Mighty Inoue (4)	February 23, 1979	Big Fight Series	Chiba, Japan	1	415	9	Two-out-of-three falls match. This was a New Japan Pro Wrestling event.	
—	Vacated	April 13, 1980	—	—	—	—	—	Vacated when Hamaguchi sustained an injury.	
22	Haruka Eigen and Strong Kobayashi (3)	June 29, 1980	Big Summer Series	Tokyo, Japan	1	16	0	Eigen and Kobayashi defeated Animal Hamaguchi and Mighty Inoue for the vacant Championship. Two-out-of-three falls match.	
23	Animal Hamaguchi (4) and Mighty Inoue (5)	July 15, 1980	Big Summer Series	Fuji, Japan	2	277	5	Two-out-of-three falls match.	
—	Vacated	April 18, 1981	—	—	—	—	—	Vacated when Hamaguchi was unable to wrestle because of liver problems.	
24	Paul Ellering and Terry Latham	May 4, 1981	Big Challenge Series	Sapporo, Japan	1	12	1	Ellering and Latham defeated Mighty Inoue and Rusher Kimura for the vacant Championship. Two-out-of-three falls match.	
25	Ashura Hara and Mighty Inoue (6)	May 16, 1981	Big Challenge Series	Tokyo, Japan	1	85	2		
—	Deactivated	September 30, 1981	—	—	—	—	—	Deactivated when the promotion folded.	

== See also ==
- IWA World Heavyweight Championship (International Wrestling Enterprise)
