= Larry Hennig =

American professional wrestler (1936–2018)

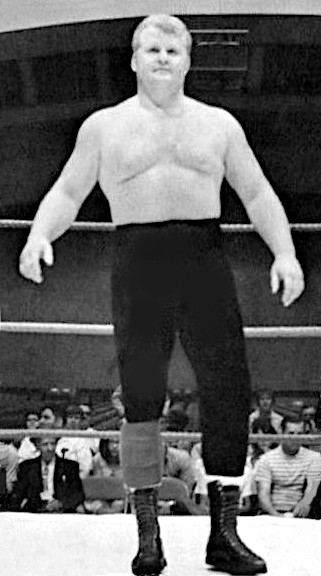
- Hennig in the late 1960s

Personal information
- Born: June 18, 1936 Minneapolis, Minnesota, U.S.
- Died: December 6, 2018 (aged 82) St. Cloud, Minnesota, U.S.
- Spouse: Irene Hennig (m. 1955)
- Children: 5, including Curt

Professional wrestling career
- Ring name: Larry "The Axe" Hennig
- Billed height: 6 ft 1 in (1.85 m)
- Billed weight: 275 lb (125 kg)
- Billed from: Robbinsdale, Minnesota
- Trained by: Verne Gagne
- Debut: 1956
- Retired: 1986

Larry Hennig (June 18, 1936 – December 6, 2018) was an American professional wrestler. He was the father of "Mr. Perfect" Curt Hennig, and the grandfather of Curtis Axel and Amy "Ms. Perfect" Hennig. He worked in the American Wrestling Association, National Wrestling Alliance, and the World Wide Wrestling Federation. Hennig was known by the nickname, "The Axe", a nickname he had because of his signature, often finishing move of dropping a full weight elbow onto his prone opponents.

== Professional wrestling career ==
=== American Wrestling Association (1956–1967) ===
In the early 1960s, Hennig entered the American Wrestling Association (AWA) under the tutelage of Verne Gagne. He eventually found some main event success and shared a brief Tag Team Championship reign with Duke Hoffman. But due to frequently losing to rougher, more experienced wrestlers, he began questioning the scientific style instilled into him by Gagne and looked toward a different approach (in kayfabe).

During the summer of 1963, Hennig left the AWA for a stint in the Texas territories. While touring Texas, Hennig adopted a more brutal style and won the Texas Heavyweight Title. He also crossed paths with Harley Race. The two young wrestlers struck up a friendship and following their mutual commitment in Amarillo, broke out as a new team into the Minneapolis wrestling scene. Race and Hennig branded themselves as "Handsome" Harley Race and "Pretty Boy" Larry Hennig, a cocky villainous tag team with a penchant for breaking the rules to win matches. They quickly became top contenders, and on January 30, 1965, they defeated the tandem of Dick the Bruiser and The Crusher to capture the AWA World Tag Team Championship, becoming, at the time, the youngest tag team champions ever. Race and Hennig continued to feud with the Bruiser and Crusher and other top teams for the next several years, amassing three title reigns.

Verne Gagne, in particular, was a hated rival of the team and recruited many different partners to try to defeat Race and Hennig during their AWA run. Gagne and Crusher won the titles from them six months after Race and Hennig's first reign but lost them back on August 7, 1965. The team retained the titles until May 1966 when they lost to Bruiser and Crusher. They then embarked on a tour through New Zealand, Japan, and Australia where they became the first Tag Team Champions of Australia's World Championship Wrestling in June. Just before leaving to Japan, they dropped the titles to Mark Lewin and Dominic DeNucci.

Race and Hennig returned to the US in fall of 1966, starting back at the bottom of the competition. As they climbed the ranks all over again, they received a title shot on January 6, 1967, and defeated Bruiser and Crusher in Chicago, Illinois. This would prove to be their final reign at AWA Tag Team Champions.

On November 1, 1967, during a tag team match in Winnipeg, Hennig was in the middle of lifting Johnny Powers as another opponent rammed into him from the front. As he dropped Powers to the mat, Hennig found that his knee had bent inward. Despite severe damage to the cartilage and tendons, he refused to go to the local hospital and instead had Race drive him 500 miles home to Minneapolis. The injury ended their last title run. The AWA allowed Harley Race to select another partner to defend the championship.

=== NWA and various promotions (1968–1974) ===
In March 1968, Hennig returned to once again wrestle alongside Race. After several years at the top of the tag team division, however, Race returned home to Kansas City to pursue a singles career in the National Wrestling Alliance. Hennig was then partnered with Lars Anderson and then "Dirty" Dusty Rhodes (who was then a heel). In the early 1970s he competed in singles matches working against champions Pedro Morales and Bruno Sammartino.

In November and December 1970, Hennig wrestled in Japan for the International Wrestling Enterprise promotion as part of its Big Winter Series. Teaming with Bob Windham, he defeated Great Kusatsu and Thunder Sugiyama in a two-out-of-three falls match to win the IWA World Tag Team Championship. Kusatsu and Sugiyama regained the titles from them several weeks later.

Hennig also traveled to New York City to unsuccessfully challenge Bruno Sammartino for his WWF World Heavyweight Championship title from 1973 to 1974.

=== Return to AWA (1974–1986) ===
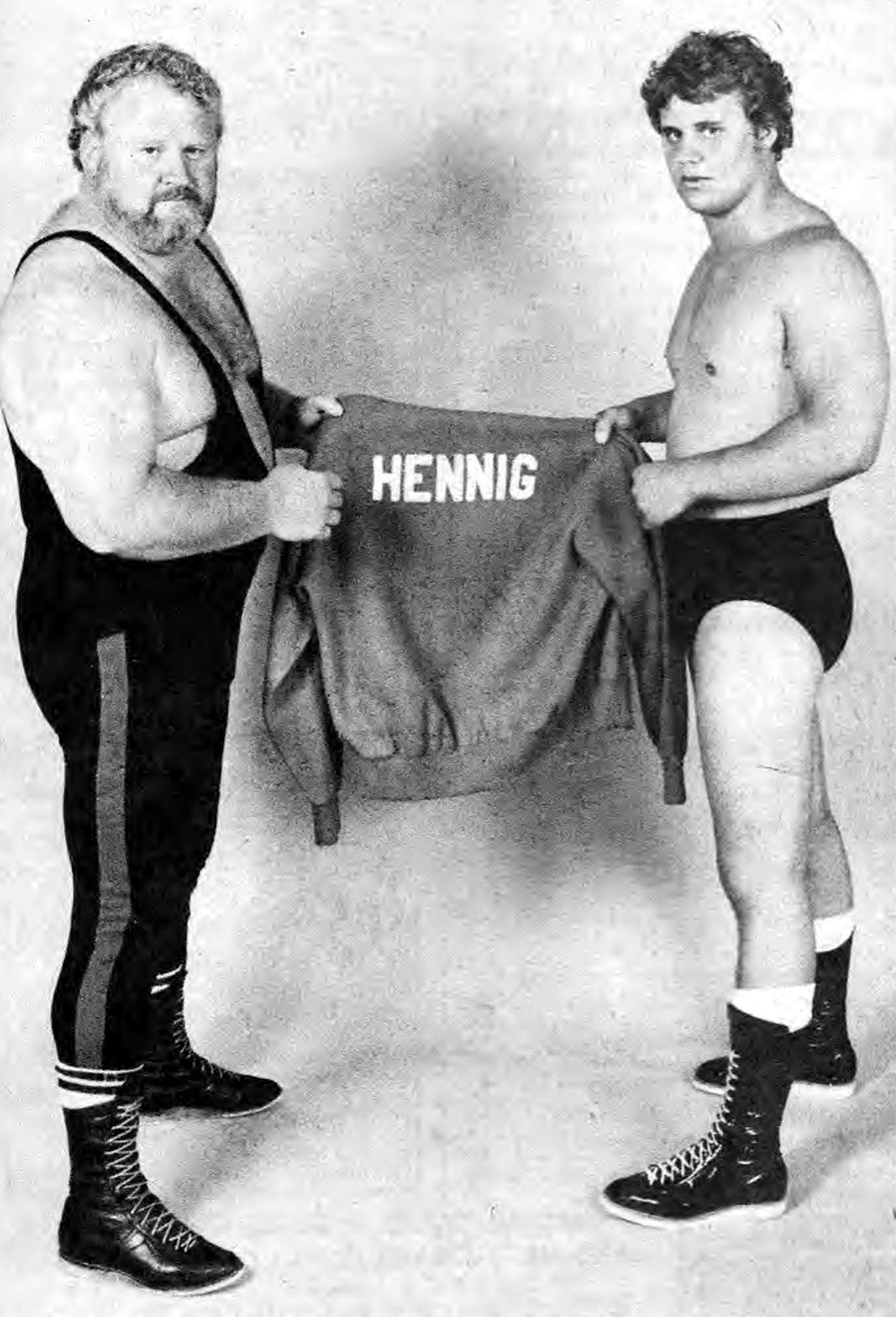
Hennig (left) with his son Curt (right), circa 1981

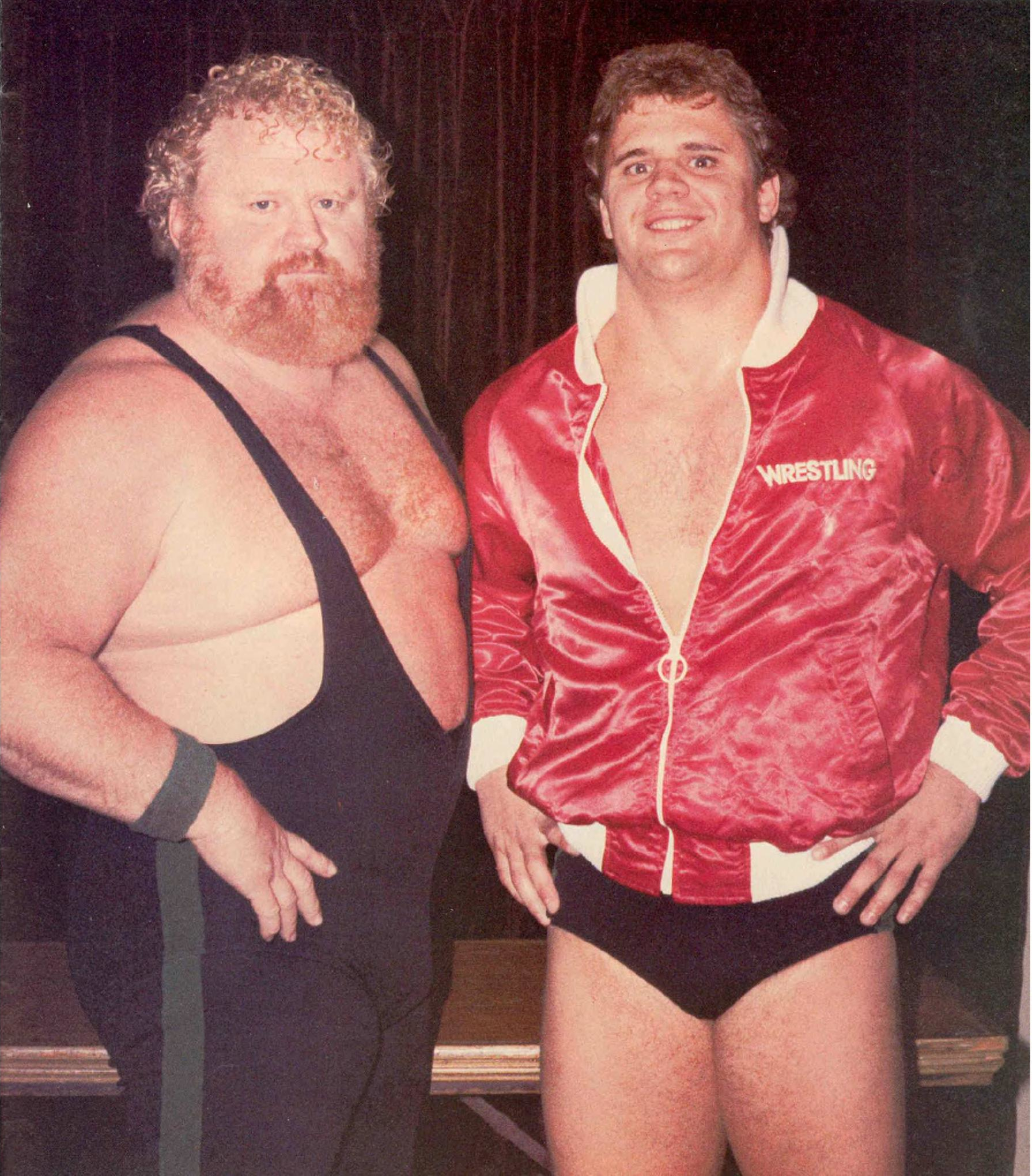
Larry and Curt, circa 1985

Hennig made a face turn on August 10, 1974, at a TV taping in Minneapolis, now sporting a full red beard and calling himself "the Axe" when he saved the High Flyers, Jim Brunzell and Greg Gagne, from an attack. The event had Hennig opposing his former allies, Nick Bockwinkel and Ray Stevens, and manager Bobby Heenan (who Bockwinkel and Stevens hired following their recent loss of the AWA World Tag Team title to The Crusher and Billy Robinson the previous month) as they assaulted the Flyers during an episode of AWA All-Star Wrestling.

During this time, Hennig also appeared in the independent film, The Wrestler, where he faced Verne Gagne at the Cow Palace in the opening match. In 1976, Hennig formed a team with Joe LeDuc.

When Harley Race returned to the AWA in 1984, he wrestled Hennig's son, Curt - a match that was fueled by Larry going on to confront his former tag team partner at the end of the match. The following year, Curt's first major push came, when he would be pushed alongside his father in a feud with The Road Warriors. The Hennigs eventually went in to win the NWA Pacific Northwest Tag Team Championship before Larry's retirement the next year in 1986.

== Personal life ==
Before pursuing a career in professional wrestling, Hennig became the Minnesota State High School Heavyweight Champion from Robbinsdale, Minnesota, in 1954. He was awarded a scholarship from the University of Minnesota to wrestle and play football but had to quit due to the priorities of family and raising children. He had five children, including professional wrestler Curt Hennig. Curt died on February 10, 2003, of an acute cocaine intoxication. After the highly publicized death of Chris Benoit, Hennig shared a few words with USA Today regarding premature deaths in professional wrestling.

Hennig was also known for his completion of the 1966 and 1967 I-500 snowmobile race, from Winnipeg, Manitoba to St. Paul, Minnesota. He is most notably remembered from the 1966 race in which he drove through a chicken coop. However, this did not prevent him from successfully completing the 500 mile race.

=== Post-retirement ===
Following Hennig's retirement from professional wrestling, he and his wife became owners of a real estate company in St. Cloud, Minnesota. He had sold real estate since 1957 and also worked as an auctioneer. He also dabbled in commodity futures, specifically CME Dairy.

=== Death ===
Hennig died on December 6, 2018, of kidney failure at the age of 82.

== Championships and accomplishments ==
- American Wrestling Association
  - AWA Midwest Tag Team Championship (1 time) - with Lars Anderson
  - AWA World Tag Team Championship (4 times) - with Duke Hoffman (1) and Harley Race (3)
  - AWA World Tag Team Championship Tournament (1962) - with Duke Hoffman
- Cauliflower Alley Club
  - Iron Mike Mazurki Award (2015)
- George Tragos/Lou Thesz Professional Wrestling Hall of Fame
  - Class of 2006
  - Lou Thesz Award (2013)
- International Wrestling Enterprise
  - IWA World Tag Team Championship (1 time) - with Blackjack Mulligan
- Pacific Northwest Wrestling
  - NWA Pacific Northwest Tag Team Championship (1 time) - with Curt Hennig
- Professional Wrestling Hall of Fame
  - Class of 2017 - Inducted as a part of a tag team with Harley Race
- Western States Sports
  - NWA Brass Knuckles Championship (Amarillo version) (1 time)
