= Haruka Eigen =

Personal information
- Born: 11 January 1946 Rokusei, Ishikawa, Japan
- Died: 28 November 2016 (aged 70) Japan

Professional wrestling career
- Ring name(s): Great Togo; Haruka Eigen
- Billed height: 1.78 m (5 ft 10 in)
- Billed weight: 110 kg (243 lb)
- Debut: October 12, 1966
- Retired: March 26, 2006

Haruka Eigen (永源 遙, Eigen Haruka) (January 11, 1946 – November 28, 2016) was a Japanese professional wrestler. He was an executive director of Pro Wrestling Noah.

== Sumo career ==
In July 1961, Haruka Eigen began competing in sumo wrestling. He was part of the Tatsunami stable. He quit sumo in May 1965, after nearly four years. His highest rank was makushita 71.

== Professional wrestling career ==
=== Tokyo Pro Wrestling (1966–1967) ===
Trained by former sumos Toyonobori and Mr. Hito at the Japan Pro Wrestling Alliance Dojo, Eigen followed Antonio Inoki to form Tokyo Pro Wrestling, where he debuted on October 12, 1966, against future rival Masao Kimura. After a brief interpromotional feud with International Wrestling Enterprise, however, Tokyo Pro folded and he followed Inoki to JWA.

=== Japan Pro Wrestling Alliance (1967–1973) ===
Eigen joined JWA in 1967 and was further trained by former judoka Seiji Sakaguchi. After spending six years struggling on the undercard, he finally left JWA in 1973, and the promotion soon folded.

=== New Japan Pro-Wrestling (1973–1984) ===
After leaving JWA in 1973, Eigen intended to join Sakaguchi in New Japan Pro-Wrestling. Beforehand, he went on an excursion in the United States. While there, he wrestled in the Central States area, under the name The Great Togo (not to be confused with Kazuo Okamura, who wrestled under the same name), wrestling mainly in Kansas City and St. Louis. In March 1973, he won his first championship, the NWA North American Tag Team Championship, with Tokyo Joe (his mentor, Mr. Hito). They would hold onto the titles for about a month, until the titles were abandoned, making them the last holders of the titles.

Upon returning to Japan full-time with NJPW, Eigen became a solid hand for the undercard and mid-card matches. In 1979, he would bounce back and forth between NJPW and IWE. Teaming with Strong Kobayashi, they won the IWA World Tag Team Championship in June 1980. They would hold onto the titles for over two weeks before losing them to Animal Hamaguchi and Mighty Inoue. Upon returning to NJPW on a full-time basis after a year, he began to feel disenchanted. He rekindled his feud with Rusher Kimura beginning in 1981 when Kimura joined NJPW after IWE closed. In 1983, he joined Riki Choshu's Ishin Gundan. A year later, he followed Choshu in leaving NJPW, after following Inoki for nearly two decades.

=== All Japan Pro Wrestling (1984–2000) ===
Joining All Japan Pro Wrestling in September 1984, he was part of the Japan Pro-Wrestling satellite, until it dissolved in March 1987. He chose to remain alongside Yoshiaki Yatsu and Shinichi Nakano. All the while he feuded with Rusher Kimura; their last singles match happened on April 9, 1987. On May 12, 1989, Kimura and Eigen faced each other within a six-man tag team match, their first undercard six-man bout; Eigen, along with Masanobu Fuchi and Motoshi Okuma lost to Kimura, Giant Baba and Akira Taue.

Since then, he had primarily used in multi-man tag team matches and comedy matches, mostly partnering with Fuchi and opposing Kimura, Baba and Mitsuo Momota. He would remain with All Japan until the Pro Wrestling Noah exodus in June 2000, ending his nearly sixteen-year run with AJPW.

=== Pro Wrestling Noah (2000–2006) ===
In August 2000, Eigen joined Pro Wrestling Noah. However, like in AJPW since the dissolution of Japan Pro Wrestling, he was mainly used for multi-man tag team matches and comedy matches. However, in January 2005, he was given a shot at the GHC Openweight Hardcore Championship against Naomichi Marufuji, but narrowly lost. He wrestled his last match of his career on March 26, 2006, teaming with Jun Akiyama, in a loss to Akira Taue and Masao Inoue.

== Retirement and death ==
After retiring, Eigen focused on his work as executive director of Pro Wrestling Noah, overseeing sales and marketing. In July 2009, a month after Mitsuharu Misawa's death, he resigned as a director and retired as a counselor for the promotion's board of directors.

In September 2010, Eigen returned as a member of the GHC Championship committee. However, a ticket scandal with the Yakuza forced him to resign from the committee in March 2012 and was demoted into a general employee, as was general manager Ryu Nakata. Eigen and Nakata had ties with the Yakuza between 2003 and 2010.

On November 28, 2016, Eigen died at his home at the age of 70. Originally, it was reported that he suffered a fall in the bathroom, but it was later confirmed that the fall was caused by a heart attack.

== Championships and accomplishments ==
- Cauliflower Alley Club
  - Men’s Wrestling Award (2008)
- Central States Wrestling
  - NWA North American Tag Team Championship (Central States version) (1 time) – with Tokyo Joe
  - NWA World Tag Team Championship (Central States version) (2 times) – with Tokyo Joe
- International Wrestling Enterprise
  - IWA World Tag Team Championship (1 time) – with Strong Kobayashi
- NWA Mid-America
  - NWA Mid-America Heavyweight Championship (1 time)
  - NWA Mid-America Tag Team Championship (2 times) – with Tojo Yamamoto (1) and Bobby Eaton (1)
  - NWA Six-Man Tag Team Championship (1 time) – with David Schultz and Tojo Yamamoto
- Tokyo Sports
  - Service Award (2006)
