= New Tokyo Pro Wrestling =

Professional wrestling promotion

Tokyo Pro Wrestling (1994–1996) New Tokyo Pro Wrestling (1997–1998)
- Acronym: TPW
- Headquarters: Tokyo
- Founder: Takashi Ishikawa

The new version of Tokyo Pro Wrestling was started by former All Japan Pro Wrestling and Super World of Sports wrestler Takashi Ishikawa in 1994.

== History ==
Tokyo Pro was one of the many independents that arose following SWS's collapse in 1992. In 1996, they found a businessman by the name of Kotaro Ishizawa who was willing to bankroll the promotion using his bike messenger business, which enabled Ishikawa to bring foreigners, namely Abdullah the Butcher, 2 Cold Scorpio, and Sabu. It was their peak year, when they were able to hold feuds against WAR and UWFI, but economic problems relating to Kotaro Ishizawa's business' collapse sent Tokyo Pro Wrestling on a downward spiral.

The promotion was briefly reborn as Shin (New) Tokyo Pro Wrestling but remained in an even bigger obscure status. One of its top trainees, Shigeo Okumura, ended up spending more time competing for AJPW and eventually joined it in 2000, following the Pro Wrestling Noah split.

=== Alumni ===
==== Natives ====
- Takashi Ishikawa
- Poison Sawada
- Shigeo Okumura
- Masashi Aoyagi
- Daikokubō Benkei
- Hikaru Kawabata
- Yoji Anjo

==== Foreigners ====
- Abdullah the Butcher
- 2 Cold Scorpio
- Sabu

=== Championships ===
During their period as Tokyo Pro Wrestling, their governing body was called the Tokyo Wrestling Association. The TWA never had a heavyweight championship.

==== TWA Junior Heavyweight Championship ====
Key
| No. | Overall reign number |
| Reign | Reign number for the specific champion |
| Days | Number of days held |

| No. | Champion | Championship change | | | Reign statistics | | Notes | Ref. |
| No. | Champion | Date | Event | Location | Reign | Days | Notes | Ref. |
|---|---|---|---|---|---|---|---|---|
| 1 | Masao Orihara | October 10, 1996 | Battle Entertainment '96 | Osaka, Japan | 1 | 63 | Defeats Kenichi Yamamoto in four-man tournament final; originally the match had finished in a 15-minute time-limit draw but the match went into overtime, where Orihara won after 55 seconds. | |
| — | Deactivated | December 12, 1996 | — | — | — | — | Title retired on the last Tokyo Pro Wrestling card before it re-opened as New Tokyo Pro Wrestling. | |

== See also ==
- Professional wrestling in Japan
