= Mighty Inoue =

Japanese professional wrestler (1949–2024)

Personal information
- Born: Sueo Inoue; April 12, 1949 Kobe, Hyogo, Japan
- Died: November 27, 2024 (aged 75)

Professional wrestling career
- Ring name(s): All Mighty Inoue; Chati Mikki Inoue; Enzo Inoue; Mickey Inoue; Mighty Inoue; Mitsu Inoue; Sueo Inoue; Tonpachi Inoue
- Billed height: 175 cm (5 ft 9 in)
- Billed weight: 105–108 kg (231–238 lb)
- Trained by: Billy Robinson; Hiro Matsuda
- Debut: July 21, 1967
- Retired: April 4, 1997

Sueo Inoue (April 12, 1949 – November 27, 2024), better known by the ring names Mighty Inoue (Japanese: マイティ井上) and All Mighty Inoue, was a Japanese professional wrestler and referee. He is best known for his appearances with International Wrestling Enterprise from 1967 to 1981, with All Japan Pro-Wrestling from 1981 to 2000, and with Pro Wrestling Noah from 2000 to 2010 as a referee.

== Early life ==
While attending high school, Inoue competed in judo.

== Professional wrestling career ==
=== International Wrestling Enterprise (1967–1981) ===
Inoue was trained to wrestle by Billy Robinson and Hiro Matsuda. He debuted on July 21, 1967 for the International Wrestling Enterprise promotion.

Around 1970-1971, Inoue wrestled in Europe, primarily in the United Kingdom for Joint Promotions and in Germany for Verband Deutscher Berufsringer. It was during this time, he befriended André the Giant.

From May to October 1972, Inoue wrestled in Montreal, Canada where he teamed with Mitsu Arakawa.

In October 1974, Inoue defeated Superstar Billy Graham in an upset victory to win the IWA World Heavyweight Championship. On November 21, 1974, he fought Verne Gagne in a double title match for the AWA and IWE World Titles. The match went to a double knockout. He held the IWA Title until April 1975, when he lost to Mad Dog Vachon.

In 1975, Inoue formed a tag team with Great Kusatsu. Between June 1975 and January 1977, they held the IWA World Tag Team Championship three times. Inoue held the IWA World Tag Team Championship twice more from 1979 to 1981 with Animal Hamaguchi, then a final time with Ashura Hara in 1981.

From April to August 1977, Inoue returned to Canada, this time for Stampede Wrestling in Calgary.

=== All Japan Pro Wrestling (1981–2000) ===
In 1981, following the closure of International Wrestling Enterprise, Inoue joined All Japan Pro Wrestling full-time as part of its junior heavyweight division. He made his debut in October 1981 during the "Giant Series" tour, forming a tag team with Ashura Hara known as the "Japanese High Flyers". The duo held the All Asia Tag Team Championship from February 1983 to February 1984.

In February 1984, Inoue defeated Chavo Guerrero to win the NWA International Junior Heavyweight Championship; he held the title until June 1985, when he lost to Dynamite Kid. From 1985 to 1987, he won the All Asia Tag Team Championship twice with Takashi Ishikawa. In January 1989, he defeated Joe Malenko for the World Junior Heavyweight Championship; his reign lasted until March 1989, when he lost to Masanobu Fuchi. From 1990 to 1993, he was part of the Tsuruta-gun stable.

In April 1994, Inoue formed a "legends" stable with Haruka Eigen and Masanobu Fuchi which was known as "Akuyaku Shokai". For the next three years, he primarily competed alongside them in tag team matches and six-man tag team matches. They primarily wrestled against other older wrestlers, Giant Baba, Rusher Kimura, and Mitsuo Momota, who were known as "Family Gundan"; these matches would typically take place on the undercard. Inoue retired from professional wrestling in April 1997, transitioning to refereeing.

=== Pro Wrestling Noah (2000–2010) ===
In 2000, Inoue was among the personnel to leave AJPW to join Mitsuharu Misawa's breakway Pro Wrestling Noah promotion. He worked for Noah as a referee for the next decade. He broke his retirement for a single night on December 31, 2009, wrestling in an elimination match at the "New Year's Eve Special" event jointly promoted by Big Japan Pro Wrestling, DDT Pro-Wrestling, and Kaientai Dojo. He retired from the professional wrestling industry in 2010 following Misawa's death.

== Personal life and death ==
During his time in IWE, Inoue ran a beer hall in Shimokitazawa.

Inoue died from heart failure on November 27, 2024, at the age of 75.

== Professional wrestling style and persona ==
Inoue wrestled in a "technical" style. His finishing moves included the "Somersault Drop" (a somersault senton) and the sunset flip. In AJPW, he customarily wrestled in red tights or two-tone red and blue tights, while in IWE, his tights had floral, psychedelic and mosaic patterns.

== Championships and accomplishments ==
- All Japan Pro Wrestling
  - All Asia Tag Team Championship (4 times) – with Ashura Hara (1 time), Animal Hamaguchi (1 time), and Takashi Ishikawa (2 times)
  - NWA International Junior Heavyweight Championship (1 time)
  - World Junior Heavyweight Championship (1 time)
- International Wrestling Enterprise
  - IWA World Heavyweight Championship (1 time)
  - IWA World Tag Team Championship (6 times) – with Ashura Hara (1 time), Animal Hamaguchi (2 times), and Great Kusatsu (3 times)
