= Ashura Hara =

Japanese wrestler and rugby union footballer (1947-2015)

Personal information
- Born: Susumu Hara; January 8, 1947 Isahaya, Nagasaki, Japan
- Died: April 28, 2015 (aged 68) Isahaya, Nagasaki, Japan

Professional wrestling career
- Ring name(s): Ashura Hara; Susumu Hara; Fighting Hara
- Billed height: 1.83 m (6 ft 0 in)
- Billed weight: 92 kg (203 lb) – 125 kg (276 lb)
- Trained by: Isao Yoshiwara
- Debut: June 23, 1978
- Retired: October 29, 1994

Susumu Hara (原 進, Hara Susumu) (January 8, 1947 – April 28, 2015) was a Japanese rugby player and professional wrestler, better known by his ring name Ashura Hara (阿修羅・原).

== Rugby career ==
Susumu Hara began his rugby career in high school, playing for the Agricultural High School in the Isahaya region of Nagasaki. Upon graduating high school, he continued his rugby career in college for Toyo University. After college, he was drafted by the Kintetsu Liners. In 1976, he was elected to represent Japan.

== Wrestling career ==
=== International Wrestling Enterprise (1978–1981) ===
After he finished his rugby career, Susumu Hara was scouted by International Wrestling Enterprise in 1976. After a couple years of training, he finally made his debut on June 23, 1978, against Isamu Teranishi. Shortly after his debut, he went to Stampede Wrestling in Canada, under the name Fighting Hara, where he won his first championship, the Stampede British Commonwealth Mid-Heavyweight Championship, defeating Norman Frederick Charles III in July 1978. He would lose the title back to Charles five days later. In October 1978, he would tour Europe with Otto Wanz's Catch Wrestling Association. By December 1978, he returned to Japan and was given the name Ashura Hara by author Akiyuki Nosaka, who happens to be a fan of Hara's.

In May 1979, Hara won the WWU World Junior Heavyweight Championship, defeating Mile Zrno. He would be the last holder of that title. In March 1980, he went to New Japan Pro-Wrestling in an attempt to capture the WWF Junior Heavyweight Championship from Tatsumi Fujinami, but failed. After the failed attempt, he went to the United States, wrestling for Bill Watts' Mid-South Wrestling. During that time he had bulk up into a heavyweight, which caused the WWU World Junior Heavyweight title to be abandoned at the end of March 1980. Returning to IWE, he teamed up with Mighty Inoue to capture the IWA World Tag Team Championship in May 1981, defeating Paul Ellering and Terry Latham. The championships were abandoned upon IWE's closure in August 1981, making him and Inoue the final champions.

=== All Japan Pro Wrestling (1981–1988) ===
Immediately after IWE's closure, Ashura Hara, Mighty Inoue, Apollo Sugawara, and Goro Tsurumi joined All Japan Pro Wrestling, initially as an IWE stable. He would forge a longtime friendship and partnership with Genichiro Tenryu ever since. On May 3, 1982, his first heavyweight title challenge took place during an interpromotional card with Kintarō Ōki's Korean Wrestling Association in South Korea, Hara unsuccessfully challenging Oki for his All Asia Heavyweight Championship in Gwangju .

In February 1983, he and Inoue won the All Asia Tag Team Championship, defeating The Great Kojika and Motoshi Okuma to win the vacant titles. They would hold on to the titles for a year, before vacating the titles due to Inoue's focus on the NWA International Junior Heavyweight Championship. However, Hara got another partner in Takashi Ishikawa and regained the titles, defeating Gerry Morrow and Thomas Ivey to win the vacant titles. He and Ishikawa would hold on to the belts for over eight months, before vacating in October 1984. In October 1986, he teamed up with Super Strong Machine to win his third All Asia Tag Team title, defeating his former All Asia Tag Team championship partners Inoue and Ishikawa. They would hold on to the titles until Super Strong Machine's departure in June 1987 forced Hara to vacate the titles.

After vacating the All Asia Tag titles, he reformed his tag team with Tenryu, as well as forming the stable Revolution with Footloose (Samson Fuyuki and Toshiaki Kawada) and Yoshinari Ogawa (Tatsumi Kitahara would join the group upon his debut in April 1988). In September 1987, he and Tenryu won the PWF Tag Team Championship, defeating Austin Idol and Stan Hansen. They would hold onto the titles for over nine months before losing the titles to The Olympics (Jumbo Tsuruta and Yoshiaki Yatsu). He and Tenryu would rebound in August 1988 as they won the newly unified World Tag Team Championship, defeating The Olympics. They lost the belts back to The Olympics a day later.

More bad news struck Hara, as days before the World's Strongest Tag Determination League was about to take place, he was fired from AJPW by Giant Baba for massive gambling debts in November 1988. Toshiaki Kawada would take his place in teaming with Tenryu. Upon his firing, he would take a hiatus.

=== Super World of Sports (1991–1992) ===
After over two and a half years, Ashura Hara made his triumphant return to the ring for Super World of Sports in August 1991. While in SWS, he would team with Genichiro Tenryu, Samson Fuyuki, and Takashi Ishikawa, as well as WWF Superstar Davey Boy Smith. He and Tenryu teamed up for the SWS World Tag Team Championship tournament, defeating Shinichi Nakano and Tatsumi Kitahara in the semi-finals, before losing to Yoshiaki Yatsu and King Haku in the finals for the vacant titles. Turmoil backstage and money problems led SWS to its demise in June 1992.

=== WAR and retirement (1992–1994) ===
Upon SWS's closure, Ashura Hara joined Genichiro Tenryu in forming WAR. In late 1992, he, Tenryu, Takashi Ishikawa, and Tatsumi (now Koki) Kitahara were involved in a feud with New Japan's stable Heisei Ishingun, in which The Great Kabuki joined in November 1992. However, despite Kabuki's betrayal, he and his allies had added reinforcements in early 1993, thanks to another NJPW stable, Raging Staff (formerly Blonde Outlaws). By October 1993, Raging Staff had disintegrated, as Tatsutoshi Goto joined Heisei Ishingun.

In July 1994, Hara teamed up with Jinsei Shinzaki and John Tenta for a one-night six-man tag team tournament, which he lost to Genichiro Tenryu, Atsushi Onita, and Bam Bam Bigelow in the finals. On October 3, 1994, Hara announced that he was retiring after 16 years in the sport. His last match was held on October 29, in which he lost to close friend and tag team partner Tenryu.

== Retirement ==
After retiring, Hara became a rugby coach and teacher for various schools, including his alma mater.

In 2004, his mother died after suffering a stroke.

== Death ==
On April 28, 2015, Hara died from pneumonia in a hospital in Isahaya, Nagasaki.

== Championships and accomplishments ==
- All Japan Pro Wrestling
  - All Asia Tag Team Championship (3 times) – with Mighty Inoue (1), Takashi Ishikawa (1), and Super Strong Machine (1)
  - PWF World Tag Team Championship (1 time) – with Genichiro Tenryu
  - World Tag Team Championship (1 time) – with Genichiro Tenryu
  - World's Strongest Tag Determination League New Wave Award (1981) – with Genichiro Tenryu
  - World's Strongest Tag Determination League Fighting Spirit Award (1982) – with Genichiro Tenryu
  - World's Strongest Tag Determination League Fighting Spirit Award (1983) – with Mighty Inoue
  - World's Strongest Tag Determination League Fighting Spirit Award (1985) – with Rusher Kimura
  - World's Strongest Tag Determination League Outstanding Performance Award (1987) – with Genichiro Tenryu
  - World's Strongest Tag Determination League Outstanding Fighting Spirit Award (1987) – with Genichiro Tenryu
- International Wrestling Enterprise
  - IWA World Tag Team Championship (1 time) – with Mighty Inoue
  - WWU World Junior Heavyweight Championship (1 time)
- Pro Wrestling Illustrated
  - Ranked No. 30 of the 100 best tag team of the "PWI Years" with Genichiro Tenryu in 2003
- Stampede Wrestling
  - Stampede British Commonwealth Mid-Heavyweight Championship (1 time)
- Tokyo Sports
  - Best Tag Team Award (1987) – with Genichiro Tenryu
  - Match of the Year Award (1994) with Genichiro Tenryu vs. Atsushi Onita and Tarzan Goto on March 2
  - Outstanding Performance Award (1979)
  - Service Award (1994)
  - Technique Award (1981)
