= Blackjack Mulligan =

American professional wrestler and American football player (1942–2016)

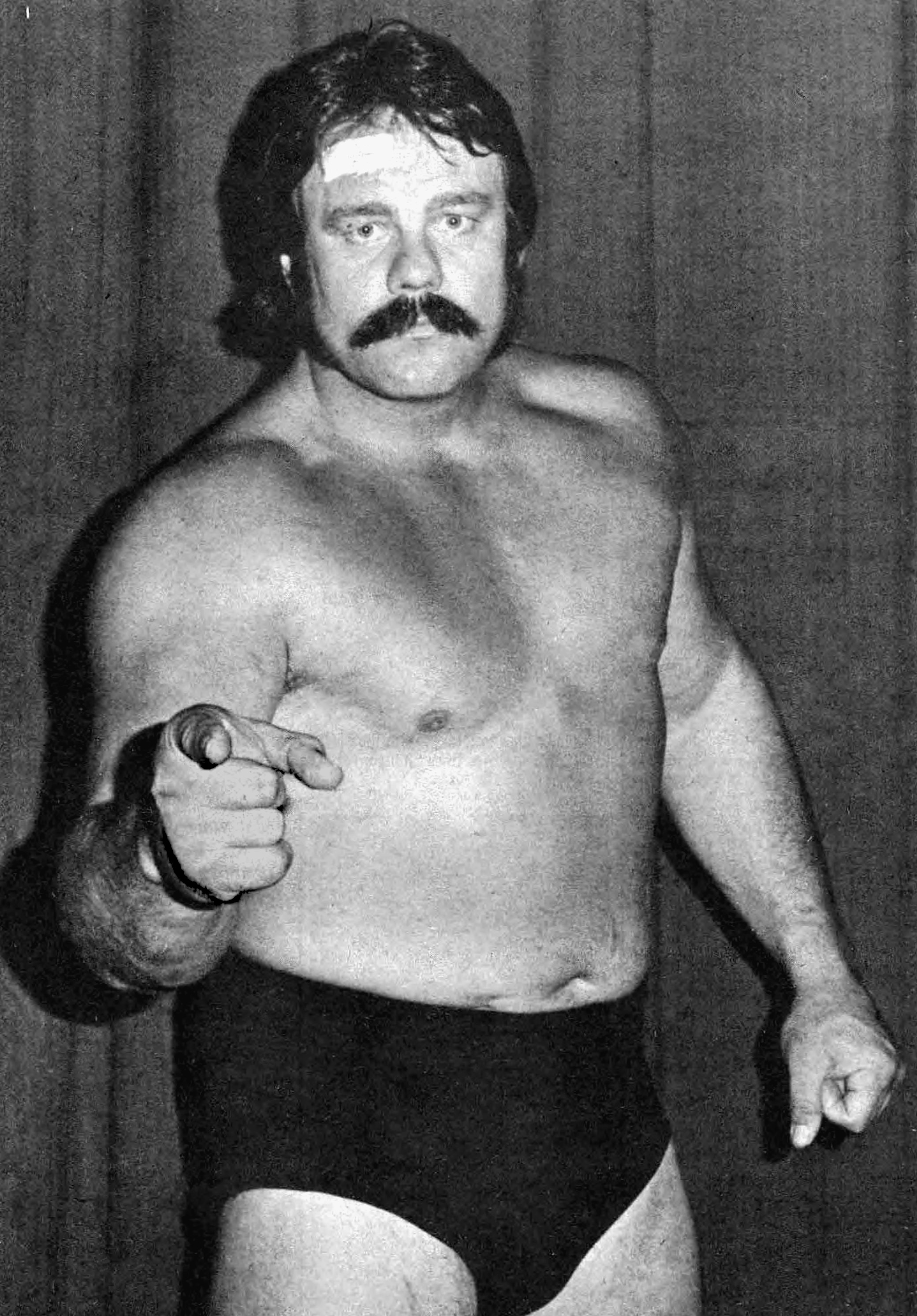
- Mulligan, circa 1979

Personal information
- Born: Robert Deroy Windham; November 25, 1942 Sweetwater, Texas, U.S.
- Died: April 7, 2016 (aged 73) Tampa, Florida, U.S.
- Education: Texas Western College
- Spouse: Julia Windham
- Children: 3, including Barry Windham and Kendall Windham
- Family: Mike Rotunda (son-in-law); Bo Dallas (grandson); Bray Wyatt (grandson)

Professional wrestling career
- Ring name(s): Big Bob Windham; Big Machine; Blackjack Mulligan; The Texan
- Billed height: 6 ft 9 in (206 cm)
- Billed weight: 300 lb (136 kg)
- Billed from: Eagle Pass, Texas; El Paso, Texas (1982)
- Trained by: Verne Gagne
- Debut: 1967
- Retired: May 23, 1993
- Military service
- Allegiance: United States
- Branch: Marine Corps

Robert Deroy Windham (November 25, 1942 – April 7, 2016), better known by his ring name Blackjack Mulligan, was an American professional wrestler and American football player. He was the father of wrestlers Barry and Kendall Windham, father-in-law of Mike Rotunda, and the maternal grandfather of Bo Dallas and Bray Wyatt.

== American football career ==
As a young man, Windham played football at Texas Western College, now known as the University of Texas at El Paso. Windham served a tour of duty in the United States Marine Corps, serving in Guam. He then went on to play for the New York Jets during the 1966 pre-season and received tryouts with the New Orleans Saints and Denver Broncos.

== Professional wrestling career ==
After football, at the urging of Wahoo McDaniel, Windham trained with Joe Blanchard in Corpus Christi, Texas and later with Verne Gagne and became a professional wrestler in the American Wrestling Association. Billed as being 6 foot 9 inches and over 300 pounds, Windham was a raw-boned cowboy in the vein of Bobby Duncum or Stan Hansen.

In November and December 1970, Windham (as "Bob Windham") wrestled in Japan for the International Wrestling Enterprise promotion as part of its Big Winter Series. Teaming with Larry Hennig, he defeated Great Kusatsu and Thunder Sugiyama in a two-out-of-three falls match to win the IWA World Tag Team Championship. Kusatsu and Sugiyama regained the titles from them several weeks later.

In 1971, Mulligan joined the World Wide Wrestling Federation (WWWF) where he was transformed into "Blackjack Mulligan". Mulligan donned black trunks, black hat, a black fingerless glove, moustache and used the iron claw submission hold.

When he arrived in the WWWF, he was managed by The Grand Wizard. Early stills of the two actually identify him as "Big Bob Windham". Mulligan went on to great success in the Northeast and was an early challenger to newly crowned champion Pedro Morales. His push was interrupted when he was slashed in the thigh by a fan at the Boston Garden and required hundreds of stitches to close the wound. The culprit was actually captured by Gorilla Monsoon, who threw him at the ringside police – who promptly let him go because they thought "it was part of the show".

Before he left to recover from his wound, Mulligan participated in a Madison Square Garden match against Bruno Sammartino, who was making his first appearance at the arena since the end of his nearly eight-year championship reign. Mulligan attacked Sammartino before the bell. Sammartino quickly recovered, slammed Mulligan twice and pinned him in 64 seconds. In wrestling terms, everybody "got over" – the building was sold out to the delight of promoter Vincent J. McMahon, Sammartino made a strong return to New York and Mulligan, who was in no condition to work an actual match, received a large pay-off to aid his recovery.

Once he healed, Mulligan returned to the Midwest and tagged with Blackjack Lanza to form the Blackjacks. Although Mulligan was the much bigger star, the duo went on to capture numerous tag team championships in various NWA affiliated promotions as well as the WWWF World Tag Team Championship in August 1975.

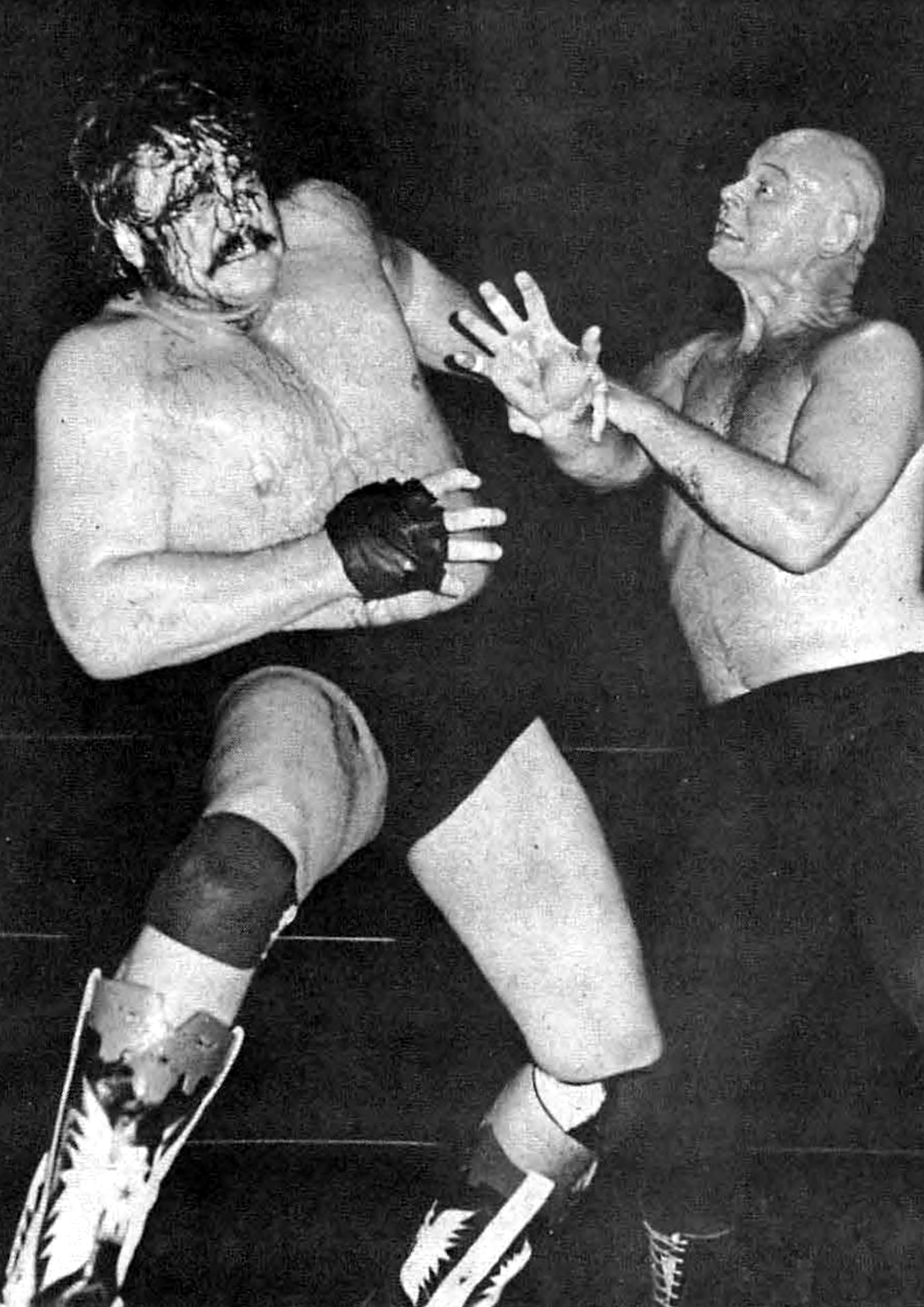
Mulligan (left) blooded during a match against Baron von Raschke (right), circa 1978.

Blackjack returned to singles wrestling in the Jim Crockett Promotions where he would go on to hold the NWA United States Heavyweight Championship and the Mid-Atlantic's version of the NWA World Tag Team Championship with Ric Flair.

Mulligan often battled André the Giant, feuding in many different regions in the early 1980s. When they brought their feud to the WWF (formerly the WWWF) in 1982, Windham was noted as saying Andre had no limit to his strength. Mulligan then wrestled in Florida. He often teamed with West Texas stars Dusty Rhodes, Dick Murdoch, and his son Barry Windham. Mulligan returned to the WWF as a full-time performer in 1984, hosting an interview segment titled Blackjack's Barbecue on WWF All-Star Wrestling, the counterpart to Roddy Piper's Piper's Pit.

In 1986, Mulligan wrestled under a mask as "Big Machine", part of a team with "The Giant Machine" (André the Giant) and "Super Machine" (Bill Eadie) collectively known as The Machines. They won several high-profile matches against the Heenan family, later recruiting members such as 'Hulk Machine' and 'Piper Machine'. After that angle ended, Mulligan wrestled for the WWF as himself, until he finally left in April 1987. Later on, Jack traveled to Dallas and competed in World Class Championship Wrestling, wrestling against Bruiser Brody, Chris Adams and Kevin and Lance Von Erich. Mulligan also returned to Florida in 1987 to fight against the Funk brothers, teaming with Kevin Sullivan.

Mulligan returned for his last match on May 23, 1993, at WCW's Slamboree '93: A Legends' Reunion in a six-man tag teaming with Wahoo McDaniel and Jim Brunzell against Don Muraco, Dick Murdoch and Jimmy Snuka in a no contest.

Mulligan worked as a match booker and promoter all around the South, eventually co-owning the Amarillo, Texas-based Western States Sports promotion with Dick Murdoch after purchasing it from Dory and Terry Funk. Mulligan and his Blackjacks partner, Jack Lanza were inducted into the WWE Hall of Fame on April 1, 2006, by their manager, Bobby Heenan.

== Personal life ==
In 1990, Blackjack Mulligan and his son Kendall Windham were arrested by the US Secret Service in a joint investigation with the Florida Department of Law Enforcement (FDLE) for counterfeiting. The authorities found close to $500,000 in phony $20 bills. As a result of a plea agreement, both father and son spent 24 months in a federal prison and were released in 1992.

In 2007, Windham published his book titled True Lies and Alibis, which tells about his personal life and his professional wrestling career.

In 2012, Windham, a born again Christian, was ordained a minister by Divine Hearts Ministry located in Lake Saint Louis, Missouri.

In July 2015, Windham was named as a defendant in a 2015 lawsuit filed by WWE after they received a letter from him indicating that he intended to sue them for concussion-based injuries sustained during his tenure with them. He was represented by attorney Konstantine Kyros, who is involved in several other lawsuits involving former WWE wrestlers. Over two years after his death, US District Judge Vanessa Lynne Bryant dismissed the lawsuit in September 2018.

== Death ==
After dealing with health problems in recent years and being hospitalized with a heart attack several months earlier, Windham was hospitalized again in Florida in October 2015. He died on April 7, 2016. He was buried at the Florida National Cemetery.

== Legacy ==
Mulligan's son Barry Windham wrestled as Blackjack Mulligan Jr early in his career. Upon turning heel and joining the Four Horsemen, Barry adopted the signature black glove. Decades later, upon joining The Miz as his henchman, Mulligan's grandson, Bo Dallas, also incorporated the black glove into his look.

Mulligan used the "hulk up" style comeback long before Hulk Hogan emerged in the business.

His grandson Windham Rotunda was signed to WWE until his death in 2023, performing under the name Bray Wyatt. Another grandson Taylor Rotunda (Windham's brother) was signed to WWE from 2008 through 2021 and 2022 through 2026.

== Championships and accomplishments ==
- American Wrestling Association
  - 1970 Rookie of the Year
- Championship Wrestling from Florida
  - NWA Brass Knuckles Championship (Florida version) (1 time)
  - NWA United States Tag Team Championship (Florida version) (1 time) – with Dusty Rhodes
- European Wrestling Union
  - EWU World Super Heavyweight Championship (1 time)
- International Wrestling Enterprise
  - IWA World Tag Team Championship (1 time) – with Larry Hennig
- International Wrestling Federation
  - IWF Heavyweight Championship (1 time)
- Mid-Atlantic Championship Wrestling
  - NWA United States Heavyweight Championship (Mid-Atlantic version) (4 times) (Note: WWE does not recognize his 2nd reign.)
  - NWA World Tag Team Championship (Mid-Atlantic version) (1 time) – with Ric Flair
- NWA Big Time Wrestling
  - NWA American Heavyweight Championship (1 time)
  - NWA American Tag Team Championship (1 time) – with Blackjack Lanza
  - NWA Texas Heavyweight Championship (2 times)
  - NWA Texas Tag Team Championship (1 time) – with Blackjack Lanza
  - NWA Brass Knuckles Championship (Texas version) (1 time)
- NWA Western States Sports
  - NWA International Heavyweight Championship (Amarillo version) (2 times)
  - NWA Western States Tag Team Championship (1 time) – with Dick Murdoch
- Professional Wrestling Hall of Fame
  - Class of 2016 - Inducted as a member of The Blackjacks
- Pro Wrestling Illustrated
  - PWI Most Inspirational Wrestler of the Year (1978)
  - PWI ranked him #159 of the 500 best singles wrestlers during the "PWI Years" in 2003.
- World Wrestling Association
  - WWA World Heavyweight Championship (1 time)
  - WWA World Tag Team Championship (1 time) – with Blackjack Lanza
- World Wide Wrestling Federation / World Wrestling Entertainment
  - WWWF Tag Team Championship (1 time) – with Blackjack Lanza
  - WWE Hall of Fame (Class of 2006) as a member of The Blackjacks
- Wrestling Observer Newsletter
  - Most Disgusting Promotional Tactic (1984) Fake heart attack angle
