= Kazuharu Sonoda =

Japanese professional wrestler (1956–1987)

Personal information
- Born: Kazuharu Sonoda; September 16, 1956 Kobayashi, Miyazaki, Japan
- Died: November 28, 1987 (aged 31) South African Airways Flight 295, Indian Ocean, off Mauritius
- Cause of death: Plane crash
- Spouse: Mayumi Sonoda

Professional wrestling career
- Ring name(s): Haru Sonoda; Professor Sonoda; Magic Dragon; The Great Kabuki
- Billed height: 180 cm (5 ft 11 in)
- Billed weight: 110 kg (243 lb)
- Billed from: Macau (as Magic Dragon)
- Trained by: Masio Koma; Great Kabuki
- Debut: January 15, 1975

Kazuharu Sonoda (薗田 一治, Sonoda Kazuharu; September 16, 1956 – November 28, 1987) also known under the ring names Haru Sonoda (ハル 薗田) and Magic Dragon (マジック・ドラゴン, Majikku Doragon), was a Japanese professional wrestler. He was a former NWA Western States Tag Team Champion, NWA/WWC North American Tag Team Champion with Mitsu Ishikawa and the WCCW All Asia Tag Team Championship with the Great Kabuki in 1982.

== Professional wrestling career ==
Sonoda trained with the All Japan Pro Wrestling dojo for his wrestling debut, but actually made his in ring debut as a referee in late 1974 when one of the regular AJPW referees was sick and needed a replacement. On January 15, 1975, he finally made his professional wrestling debut, working under his real name early on in his career. In 1979 Sonoda and Mitsu Ishikawa traveled to North America to further their training and experience different styles of wrestling. The two worked for the Puerto Rico based World Wrestling Council (WWC) in 1979, winning the WWC North American Tag Team Championship in a tournament. The duo held the championship for 35 days, before losing the championship to WWC regulars Ciclón Negro and Huracán Castillo. After the stay in Puerto Rico the team moved on to Texas, working for an extended time for NWA Western States out of Amarillo, Texas.

Sonoda and Ishikawa won the NWA Western States Tag Team Championship in 1980 and then later lost them to the team of Larry Lane and Ted Heath. When the Western States territory closed the team of Sonoda and Ishikawa split up, with Sonoda moving on to the Georgia Championship Wrestling (GCW) where he worked as "Professor" Sonoda. In 1981 he returned to Texas, working for Fritz Von Erich's World Class Championship Wrestling (WCCW) as the masked wrestling character "Magic Dragon". In WCCW he was managed by Gary Hart and teamed up with the Great Kabuki on a regular basis. At the Fritz Von Erich Retirement Show Magic Dragon and Great Kabuki defeated David and Kevin Von Erich to win a championship billed as the "All Asian Tag Team Championship", which was not the AJPW version of the title, but a title promoter Fritz Von Erich had created for the occasion as a means to make the storyline between the two teams more prestigious.

On August 15, 1982, in one of the featured bouts on the August Wrestling Star Wars show the Von Erich brothers regained the championships, which were summarily forgotten once the storyline between the two teams ended. During that period of time, Sonoda would at times actually portray the Great Kabuki character, playing the part when the original Kabuki was double booked for appearance. Mimicking Kabuki's mannerisms, with his face pained and hair covering his face it was never noticed that it was not the original Kabuki playing the part. Sonoda, still working as "Magic Dragon" returned to AJPW in 1984. In September Magic Dragon teamed up with "Ultra Seven" to compete in the first ever AJPW Junior Tag League.

The duo defeated the team of Babyface and Fishman, but lost to every other team in the tournament. On June 5, 1985, Magic Dragon was unmasked after he lost a match to Kuniaki Kobayashi, allowing him to work as "Haru Sonoda" after the mask loss.

== Death and legacy ==
Sonoda married Mayumi Sonoda (薗田 真弓, Sonoda Mayumi) in early November, 1987 and set off on their honeymoon on November 28, 1987, to South Africa. South Africa was chosen as the location as Tiger Jeet Singh was promoting a show in the country and Giant Baba offered to fly Sonoda to compete on the show and have his honeymoon on the same trip. Sonada and his wife were passengers on the South African Airways Flight 295 that crashed near the island of Mauritius after a fire on board the plane. At the time of his death, Sonoda was training Kenta Kobashi, who debuted nearly three months after his death. Giant Baba has said he regretted sending Sonoda to South Africa for the rest of his life, and visibly cried in the ring during his memorial show.

His niece, Yukari Ishikura (石倉 由加利 Ishikura Yukari), was also a professional wrestler. She wrestled for Frontier Martial-Arts Wrestling. In 2007 and 2008 Pro Wrestling NOAH held the "Mauritius Cup" tournament in honor of Sonoda. In November 2016, Atsushi Onita and Masanobu Fuchi dedicated their All Asia Tag Team Championship win to Sonoda, whom they trained together in the AJPW Dojo in the 1970s.

== Championship and accomplishments ==
- Tokyo Sports
  - Effort Award (1978)
  - Service Prize (1987)
- Western States Sports
  - NWA Western States Tag Team Championship (1 time) - with Mitsu Ishikawa
- World Class Championship Wrestling
  - WCCW All Asia Tag Team Championship (1 time) - with the Great Kabuki
- World Wrestling Council
  - WWC North American Tag Team Championship (1 time) - with Mitsu Ishikawa

== See also ==
- List of premature professional wrestling deaths
