= IWA World Heavyweight Championship (International Wrestling Enterprise) =

Japanese wrestling competition

Details
- Promotion: International Wrestling Enterprise
- Date established: 1968
- Date retired: September 30, 1981
Statistics
- First champion: Bill Robinson
- Final champion: Rusher Kimura
- Most reigns: Rusher Kimura (5 reigns)
- Longest reign: Rusher Kimura (1,085 days)
- Shortest reign: Verne Gagne (3 days)
- Oldest champion: Verne Gagne (53 years, 260 days)
- Youngest champion: Mighty Inoue (25 years, 178 days)
- Heaviest champion: Bill Miller (290 lb (130 kg))
- Lightest champion: Verne Gagne (215 lb (98 kg))

The International Wrestling Alliance (IWA) World Heavyweight Championship (IWA世界ヘビー級王座, IWA Sekai Hebī-kyū Ōza) was a professional wrestling world heavyweight championship of the Japanese professional wrestling promotion known as International Wrestling Enterprise (国際プロレス興行, Kokusai Puroresu Kogyō). It was the first Japanese heavyweight title to be billed as a World title, and in the 1970s and early 1980s it was one of the most important titles in Japan. The title died with the promotion in 1981 but was later revived by Goro Tsurumi for his independent Kokusai Promotion.

There have been eighteen reigns between twelve wrestlers, and three vacancies.

== Title history ==
Key
No.	Overall reign number
Reign	Reign number for the specific champion
Days	Number of days held
Defenses	Number of successful defenses
N/A	Unknown information

No.	Champion	Championship change			Reign statistics			Notes	Ref.
No.	Champion	Date	Event	Location	Reign	Days	Defenses	Notes	Ref.
1	Bill Robinson	December 19, 1968	World Series	Okayama, Japan	1	151	28	Defeated Toyonobori in the final of 11-man round-robin tournament.	
2	Thunder Sugiyama	May 19, 1969	N/A	Sendai, Japan	1	654	9		
3	Bill Miller	March 4, 1971	AWA Big Fight Series	Kitakyushu, Japan	1	107	0	This was a 2-out-of-3 falls match.	
4	Strong Kobayashi	June 19, 1971	N/A	Duluth, MN	1	874	25	On the day of the title change, Miller and Kobayashi were wrestling different opponents; this title change is possibly fictitious.	
5	Wahoo McDaniel	November 9, 1973	Big Winter Series	Nachikatsuura, Japan	1	21	1	This was a 2-out-of-3 falls match.	
6	Strong Kobayashi	November 30, 1973	Big Winter Series	Tokyo, Japan	2	75	2	This was a 2-out-of-3 falls match.	
—	Vacated	February 13, 1974	—	—	—	—	—	The title was vacated when Kobayashi jumped to New Japan Pro-Wrestling to challenge Antonio Inoki.	
7	Bill Robinson	June 3, 1974	Dynamite Series	Tokyo, Japan	2	74	0	It is unclear whether Robinson defeated Great Kusatsu in a tournament final or Rusher Kimura in a 2-out-of-3 falls match to win the vacant title.	
8	Billy Graham	August 16, 1974	N/A	Denver, CO	1	52	2	On that day, Robinson was facing Buddy Wolff in Peoria, Illinois; this title change is considered fictitious.	
9	Mighty Inoue	October 7, 1974	Super Wide Series	Koshigaya, Japan	1	185	3	This was a 2-out-of-3 falls match.	
10	Mad Dog Vachon	April 10, 1975	Dynamite Series	Tokyo, Japan	1	9	0	This was a 2-out-of-3 falls match.	
11	Rusher Kimura	April 19, 1975	Dynamite Series	Sapporo, Japan	1	360	11	This was a steel cage match.	
—	Vacated	April 13, 1976	—	—	—	—	—	Kimura vacated the title because he was dissatisfied with the result of his title defense against The Undertaker (Hans Schroeder). A rematch was then scheduled.	
12	Rusher Kimura	April 22, 1976	Dynamite Series	Sendai, Japan	2	50	0	Defeated The Undertaker (Hans Schroeder) in a steel cage match to win the vacant title.	
13	Umanosuke Ueda	June 11, 1976	Big Challenge Series	Koga, Japan	1	47	0		
—	Vacated	July 28, 1976	—	—	—	—	—	Vacated after Ueda's first defense against Rusher Kimura ended in a no contest.	
14	Rusher Kimura	July 31, 1976	Big Summer Series	Koshigaya, Japan	3	1,085	26	Defeated Super Assassin (Roger Smith) in a steel cage match to win the vacant title.	
15	Alexis Smirnoff	July 21, 1979	Big Summer Series	Murakami, Japan	1	4	0	This was a 2-out-of-3 falls match.	
16	Rusher Kimura	July 25, 1979	Big Summer Series	Mishima, Japan	4	111	3		
17	Verne Gagne	November 13, 1979	Devilish Fight Series	Sanjō, Japan	1	3	0		
18	Rusher Kimura	November 16, 1979	Devilish Fight Series	Wakayama, Japan	5	687	17		
—	Deactivated	September 30, 1981	—	—	—	—	—	Deactivated when the promotion folded.	

== Combined reigns ==
Rank	Wrestler	No. of reigns	Combined defenses	Combined days
1	Rusher Kimura	5	57	2,290
2	Strong Kobayashi	2	27	949
3	Thunder Sugiyama	1	9	654
4	Bill Robinson	2	28	225
5	Mighty Inoue	1	3	185
6	Bill Miller	1	0	107
7	Billy Graham	1	2	52
8	Umanosuke Ueda	1	0	47
9	Wahoo McDaniel	1	1	21
10	Mad Dog Vachon	1	0	9
11	Alexis Smirnoff	1	0	4
12	Verne Gagne	1	0	3

== See also ==
- NWA World Heavyweight Championship
- PWF Heavyweight Championship
- NWA International Heavyweight Championship
- NWF Heavyweight Championship
