= International Wrestling Enterprise =

Professional wrestling promotion active from 1966 until 1981

- Acronym: IWE
- Founded: October 1966
- Defunct: September 30, 1981
- Headquarters: Harada Building, 2-14-2, Takadanobaba, Shinjuku, Tokyo, Japan
- Founder: Isao Yoshihara
- Parent: Tokyo Broadcasting System
- Split from: Japan Pro Wrestling Alliance
- Successor: IWA Kakutō Shijuku/International Wrestling Promotion (unofficial)

International Wrestling Enterprise (国際プロレス, Kokusai Puroresu) (Note: The promotion's official trade name was International Wrestling Enterprise Co., Ltd. (インターナショナル・レスリング・エンタープライズ株式会社, Intānashonaru Resuringu Entāpuraizu Kabushiki-gaisha)) was a professional wrestling promotion in Japan from 1966 to 1981. Founded by Isao Yoshihara, it was affiliated with the American Wrestling Association in the United States and also had tie-ins with promotions in Canada and Europe. In 1972, it became the first Japanese promotion to bring European wrestler André the Giant to the country. The promotion cooperated with All Japan Pro Wrestling (AJPW) and later, New Japan Pro-Wrestling (NJPW); the three promotions later came together for an interpromotional event, organized by Tokyo Sports, held at Budokan Hall on August 26, 1979.

When IWE closed its doors in 1981, Inoue, Hara, Tsurumi, and Fuyuki joined AJPW, while Kimura, Hamaguchi and Teranishi joined NJPW as a stable that formed the first "invasion" angle in history, later copied by the Japanese UWF, Japan Pro-Wrestling, and the nWo in WCW in America. The promotion is also credited for making Rusher Kimura a major star in Japanese Puroresu and holding Japan's first steel cage match. Isao Yoshihara eventually became a booker in New Japan, until his death in 1985.

== History ==
=== Formation and partnership with Tokyo Pro Wrestling ===
Isao Yoshihara was a former professional wrestler and member of the wrestling team at Waseda University. He had also served as sales manager for the Japan Pro Wrestling Alliance (JWA). However, following Rikidōzan's death in 1963, conflicts arose between Yoshihara and JWA head of accounting Kokichi Endo over the sale of Riki Sports Palace, a 9-storey building located in Shibuya, and on October 5, 1966, Yoshihara left JWA to found International Wrestling Enterprise (IWE). Initially facing a shortage of talents, the promotion did not follow the traditional wrestling promotion structure, opting instead to implement a freelance system more akin to the American wrestling industry, where wrestlers were contracted for each tour. This system rapidly proved ineffective, and after Yoshihara's attempt at seeking a partnership with JWA didn't go through, IWE transitioned to a more traditional structure with its own roster of contracted wrestlers.

Hiro Matsuda, who was active in the United States, was appointed as booker and "ace" of the promotion. He was accompanied by Matty Suzuki, Thunder Sugiyama and Great Kusatsu. In its early days, IWE faced financial difficulties and lost the ability to host events independently. The promotion was then approached by Antonio Inoki and Tokyo Pro Wrestling (TPW) to hold a joint tour titled "Pioneer Series" in January 1967. The tour was highlighted by the participation of Danny Hodge, The Kentuckians (Jake Smith and Luke Brown), Eddie Graham and Johnny Valentine. Furthermore, the tag team of Inoki and Matsuda, the use of an American-sized ring, and theatrical elements such as ring announcements performed by entertainers stood out to the audience. However, due to the inability to secure a television deal, the promotion struggled, and the partnership with TPW fell through after the Pioneer Series. Matsuda had plans to invite José Lothario, Tarzan Tyler, Sputnik Monroe and Bob Orton for the second tour, but they didn't come to fruition.

In early 1967, Yoshihara initiated negotiations with TBS and Fuji Television regarding television broadcasting. TBS began a credit investigation into IWE, and by February 1967, they concluded that the organization was "worthy of regular broadcasting." In the report, they added a clause stating that "broadcasting Inoki and Matsuda's matches would be an absolute requirement." TBS then requested Yoshihara to have Inoki join IWE. However, disagreements between the two of them over a joint show with TPW led to a deterioration of their relations. On April 4, TBS President Junzo Imamichi announced to the press that TBS was considering broadcasting professional wrestling and had started discussions with IWE. Just two days later, Inoki announced he was returning to JWA. After parting ways with IWE, TPW folded and Masaru Eigen, Tomoyuki Kitazawa, and Katsuhisa Shibata followed Inoki back to JWA; meanwhile Masao Kimura and Isamu Teranishi stayed with IWE. Coincidentally, Toyonobori, who did not take part in the Pioneer Series, joined IWE, and his tag team with Matsuda became central to the promotion. Eventually, both TBS and Fuji Television would greenlight an IWE broadcast, but Yoshihara ultimately chose to work with TBS.

Throughout July and August 1967, IWE held the Pioneer Summer Series. As part of the tour, an event was scheduled at the Osaka Prefectural Gymnasium on August 14. Shortly after the announce, JWA announced their own event at the Osaka Stadium to be held on the same day as part of their Summer Series I. This promotional war, later dubbed the "Osaka Summer Battle", gained a lot of attention, with JWA hosting a main event featuring Giant Baba defending the NWA International Heavyweight Championship against Gene Kiniski in a best 2-out-of-3 falls match, and IWE presenting a main event with Hiro Matsuda and Sam Steamboat facing Bill Dromo and Roger Kirby. Although IWE had announced their event first, JWA successfully attracted 20,000 spectators at the Osaka Stadium; in contrast, IWE struggled in terms of attendance, only drawing 4,200 spectators in the Prefectural Gymnasium.

=== Reboot as TBS Pro-Wrestling ===
On September 11, 1967, the TBS Television deal was signed, and a signing ceremony was attended by Isao Yoshihara, TBS Sports Director Masao Tsuruta and TBS Sports Vice Director Tadahiro Mori. In order to raise funds, IWE, through the intermediary of Mori, who was a friend of Yoshihara from their days at Waseda University, transferred its shares to Hiroshi Iwata, the president of a dairy company in Hiroshima, and asked him for a loan. Iwata thus became the new owner of IWE, and the company was restructured with the backing of TBS. Around the same time, Hiro Matsuda left IWE after a dispute with Yoshihara over how to handle debts. The Great Togo, whose contract with JWA ended four years ago, was brought in to replace Matsuda as the booker for the foreign wrestlers.

On December 22, 1967, Mori held a press conference and announced the promotion would change its name to TBS Pro-Wrestling to "take advantage of the name value of TBS". In January 1968, the Opening World Series featured Lou Thesz, Danny Hodge, Hans Schmidt, Waldo Von Erich, Bulldog Brower, and referee Fred Atkins.

== Roster ==
- Japanese talent: Toyonobori, Strong Kobayashi, Rusher Kimura, Hiro Matsuda, Thunder Sugiyama, Great Kusatsu, Mighty Inoue, Animal Hamaguchi, Ashura Hara, Isamu Teranishi, Goro Tsurumi, Hiromichi Fuyuki, Ryuma Go, KY Wakamatsu, Mach Hayato, Kintarō Ōki, Kim Duk, Mr. Hito, Umanosuke Ueda, Masa Saito, Mr. Seki.
- Foreign talent: Bill Robinson, Verne Gagne, André the Giant, George Gordienko, Lou Thesz, Karl Gotch, Danny Hodge, Don Leo Jonathan, Bill Miller, Dick the Bruiser, Crusher Lisowski, Mad Dog Vachon, Butcher Vachon, Nick Bockwinkel, Ray Stevens, Baron Von Raschke, Horst Hoffman, Édouard Carpentier, Buddy Colt, Chief White Wolf, Mikel Scicluna, King Curtis Iaukea, Rene Goulet, Peter Maivia, John da Silva, Ivan Koloff, Tarzan Tyler, Larry Hennig, Bobby Heenan, Blackjack Lanza, Blackjack Mulligan, Superstar Billy Graham, Wahoo McDaniel, Red Bastien, The Minnesota Wrecking Crew, The Kiwis, Mario Milano, Bill Watts, Dusty Rhodes, Dick Murdoch, Buddy Wolfe, Skandor Akbar, Dale Lewis, Greg Gagne, Jim Brunzell, The Brute, Tony Marino, Tex McKenzie, Cowboy Bob Ellis, Moose Morowski, Ox Baker, Wild Angus, Killer Tor Kamata, Gypsy Joe, Alexis Smirnoff, The Mongolian Stomper, The Cuban Assassin, Killer Brooks, Jos LeDuc, Sailor White, Big John Quinn, Kurt Von Hess, The Masked Intern, Hercules Ayala, Professor Tanaka, Dean Ho, Haystacks Calhoun, Ed Moretti, The Wild Samoans, John Tolos, Gil Hayes, The Atomic, Pierre Martin, Michel Martel, Ricky Martel, Jake Roberts, Big Daddy Ritter, David Schultz, Dynamite Kid, Mark Rocco, Mike George, Bob Sweetan, Johnny Powers, Killer Karl Krupp, Ron Bass, Don Bass, Bobby Bass, Mike Boyette, Spike Huber, Randy Rose, Norvell Austin, The Invader, Luke Graham, Ray Candy, Paul Ellering, Steve Olsonoski, Mike Miller, Terry Gibbs, Percy Pringle III, Ric Flair.

== Championships recognized by IWE ==
IWE's governing body was called the International Wrestling Alliance and administered the following titles:

- IWA World Heavyweight Championship
- IWA World Mid-Heavyweight Championship
- IWA World Tag Team Championship

Near the end of IWE's existence, it billed a World Wrestling Union title, supposedly based in Germany, to give a push to wrestler Ashura Hara:

- WWU World Junior Heavyweight Championship

Before the IWA system was created, IWE recognized the Trans-World Wrestling Alliance titles:

- TWWA World Heavyweight Championship
- TWWA World Tag Team Championship

See also American Wrestling Association for the AWA World titles.

== Annual Tournaments ==
IWE only had a heavyweight tournament and it was sporadic. The first few tournaments were called the World Series, while the last tournament in 1978 had the branding International League.

- 1968: Billy Robinson beat Toyonobori (wins new IWA World Heavyweight Championship).
- 1969: Billy Robinson beat Strong Kobayashi (best of three series).
- 1970: No tournament was held.
- 1971: Monster Roussimoff wins by having earned the most points.
- 1972: Strong Kobayashi beat Monster Roussimoff (best of three series).
- 1973: Rusher Kimura beat Great Kusatsu.
- 1974-76: No tournament was held.
- 1977: Rusher Kimura beat Mad Dog Vachon.
- 1978 (International League): Rusher Kimura beat Professor Tanaka.

== International Wrestling Promotion (revival) ==
In 1994, Goro Tsurumi formed a promotion called IWA Kakutō Shijuku (IWA格闘志塾; International Wrestling Alliance Fighting Hope Training School), but in 1997 he renamed the promotion International Wrestling Promotion (国際プロレス・プロモーション, Kokusai Puroresu Puromōshon). The only recognizable name in the promotion was Tsurumi himself; the rest of the roster used masked identities. Wrestlers from other independents were invited to participate, including Shoji Nakamaki and Yukihide Ueno.

=== Championships recognized by IWP ===
- IWA World Heavyweight Championship — Goro Tsurumi
- IWA World Mid-Heavyweight Championship — J.R.F. Lion
- IWA World Middleweight Championship — Phantom Funagoshi
- IWA World Tag Team Championship (International Pro Wrestling) — Super Iron Hercules and Iron Hercules I
- IWA World Junior Heavyweight Tag Team Championship — Tomoya and Macho Bump

== See also ==
- Professional wrestling in Japan
- List of professional wrestling promotions in Japan
