= Animal Hamaguchi =

Japanese retired professional wrestler (born 1947)

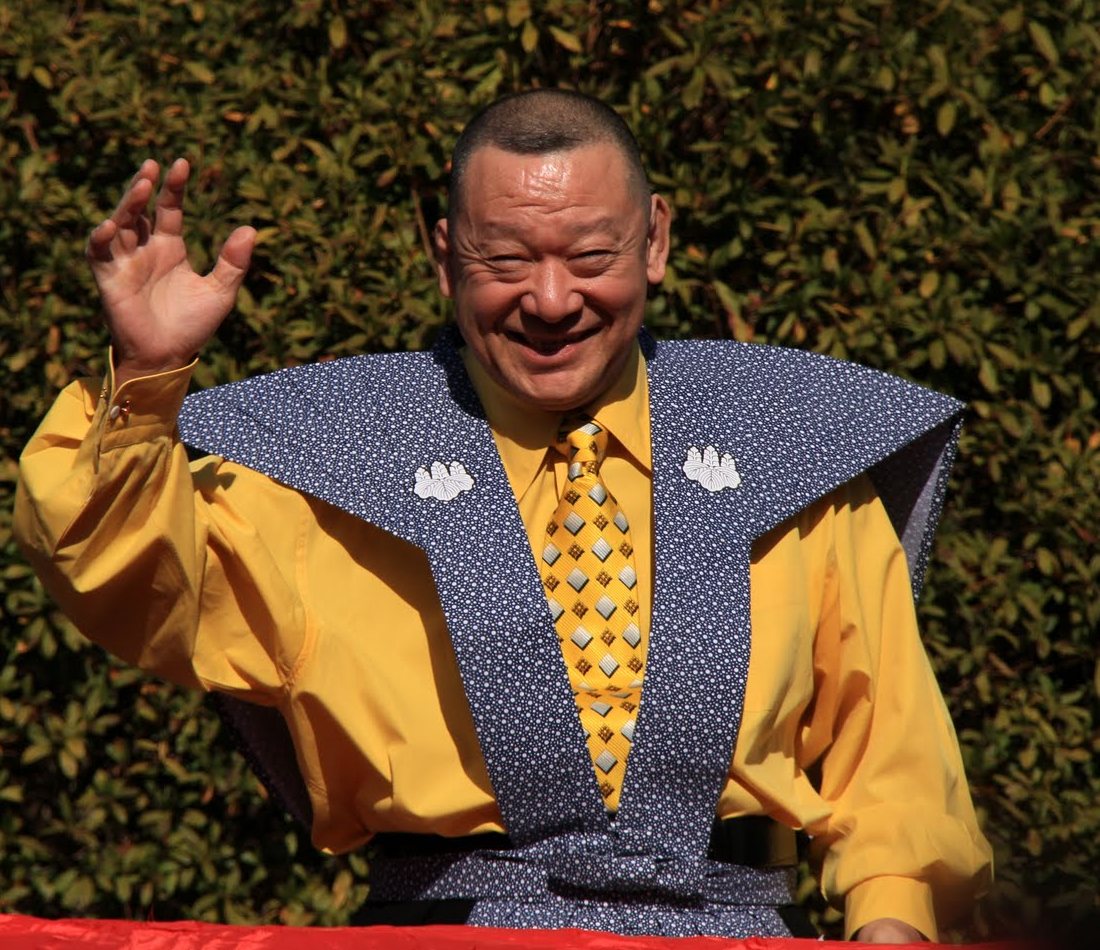
- Hamaguchi in February 2011.

Personal information
- Born: Heigo Hamaguchi; August 31, 1947 (age 78) Hamada, Shimane, Japan
- Family: Kyoko Hamaguchi (daughter)

Professional wrestling career
- Ring name(s): Animal Hamaguchi; Heigo Hamaguchi; Higo Hamaguchi
- Billed height: 178 cm (5 ft 10 in)
- Billed weight: 103 kg (227 lb)
- Trained by: Karl Gotch; Rusher Kimura; Tsutomu Yoshihara
- Debut: September 20, 1969
- Retired: 1995

Animal Hamaguchi

Japanese name
- Kanji: 濱口 平吾
- Hiragana: はまぐち へいご
- Katakana: ハマグチ ヘイゴ
Transcriptions
- Romanization: Hamaguchi Heigo

Heigo Hamaguchi (濱口 平吾, Hamaguchi Heigo; born August 31, 1947) is a Japanese retired professional wrestler, better known by the ring name Animal Hamaguchi (アニマル浜口, Animaru Hamaguchi). During his career he was recognized as a talented tag team wrestler despite his relatively small size for a heavyweight, and today he is recognized as a trainer in both professional and amateur wrestling. He is the father of freestyle wrestler Kyoko Hamaguchi.

== Professional wrestling career ==
Hamaguchi debuted in 1969 with International Wrestling Enterprise. He was a regular midcarder although his teams with Sueo Inoue and Rusher Kimura were main event. He also made forays into North American wrestling in the late 1970s, winning titles in Puerto Rico's World Wrestling Council and Canada's Stampede Wrestling.

In 1981, when IWE collapsed, Hamaguchi teamed with Kimura and Isamu Teranishi in an "invasion" angle in New Japan Pro-Wrestling. When the angle was dropped, Hamaguchi joined Riki Choshu in forming the original Ishin Gundan rebel stable.

In 1984 Ishin Gundan left NJPW and formed Japan Promotion, which eventually became a mere stable of All Japan Pro Wrestling. AJPW promoter Giant Baba ordered Choshu to replace Hamaguchi, who was rather small-sized, with rookie Yoshiaki Yatsu in order to feud with Jumbo Tsuruta and Genichiro Tenryu in the upper card. Hamaguchi thus reformed his team with Inoue in the lower card.

After Japan Pro Wrestling broke up and Choshu and others went back to NJPW in 1987, Hamaguchi chose to retire.

In 1990 he returned as Big Van Vader's partner against Antonio Inoki and Tiger Jeet Singh in Inoki's 30th anniversary match. Hamaguchi competed sporadically until settling in Tenryu's WAR in 1993. In his last earnest comeback he teamed with Tenryu and Koki Kitahara to win his last title, the WAR 6-Man Tag Team Championship.

== Retirement ==
Hamaguchi retired in 1995, after his team lost the title, to dedicate full-time to his dojo, today recognized as one of the premier independent wrestling schools in Japan. Famous pros trained by him include Satoshi Kojima, Shinjiro Otani, Shingo Takagi, Tetsuya Naito, Bushi, Takao Omori and Yota Tsuji.

He also trains amateur wrestlers, including his own daughter Kyoko, who is one of the premier amateurs in Japan. She is a two timer Olympic bronze medalist in 72 kg weight class and she has won the FILA Wrestling World Championship 5 times.

== Championships and accomplishments ==
- All Japan Pro Wrestling
  - All Asia Tag Team Championship (2 times) – with Mighty Inoue (1) and Isamu Teranishi (1)
- International Wrestling Enterprise
  - IWA World Tag Team Championship (4 times) – with Great Kusatsu (2) and Mighty Inoue (2)
- New Japan Pro-Wrestling
  - Greatest Wrestlers (Class of 2010)
- Stampede Wrestling
  - Stampede Wrestling International Tag Team Championship (1 time) – with Mr. Hito
- Tokyo Sports
  - Effort Award (1981)
  - Fighting Spirit Award (1980)
  - Outstanding Performance Award (1977)
  - Service Award (1987)
  - Special Award (1997)
- Wrestle And Romance/Wrestle Association R
  - WAR World Six-Man Tag Team Championship (1 time) – with Genichiro Tenryu & Koki Kitahara
- World Wrestling Council
  - WWC North American Tag Team Championship (1 time) – with Gordon Nelson
