= Toyonobori =

Japanese sumo and professional wrestler

Personal information
- Born: Michiharu Sadano; March 21, 1931 Kanada, Tagawa District, Fukuoka, Japan
- Died: July 1, 1998 (aged 67)

Professional wrestling career
- Ring name(s): Mr. Zero; Toyonobori
- Billed height: 5 ft 9 in (175 cm)
- Billed weight: 251 lb (114 kg)
- Trained by: Rikidōzan
- Debut: December 12, 1954
- Retired: February 20, 1973

Michiharu Sadano (定野 道春, Sadano Michiharu; March 21, 1931 – July 1, 1998), known in sumo and professional wrestling as Michiharu Toyonobori (豊登道春, Toyonobori Michiharu) or simply by his shikona Toyonobori (豊登, Toyonobori; "Riser from Toyo"), was a Japanese professional wrestler and sumo wrestler.

== Sumo career ==
Toyonobori performed as a sumo wrestler from 1947 to 1954.

== Professional wrestling career ==
=== Japanese Wrestling Association (1954–1966) ===
After retiring as a rikishi from sumo, Toyonobori became a professional wrestler. He debuted on December 12, 1954, with the Japanese Wrestling Association, which was the top wrestling promotion in Japan from 1953 until 1972 and the only male significant Japanese wrestling promotion from 1953 until 1966, when its predominance began to be challenged by International Wrestling Enterprise.

The top wrestler of the JWA was Rikidōzan, the founder of the promotion; he dominated the Japanese wrestling scene. As a result, few Japanese wrestlers were able to get into the spotlight. The more recognizable among them was Toyonobori himself, who dominated the tag team scene in Japan, forming a successful tag team with Rikidōzan, with whom he became a four-time winner of the All Asia Tag Team Championship, which was the top tag title in Japan and which is now contested in All Japan Pro Wrestling.

After Rikidōzan's death on December 15, 1963, Toyonobori, along with Yoshinosato, Koukichi Endo and Michiaki Yoshimura announced their intention to continue the JWA on January 10, 1964. Therefore, he became the president of the JWA and its top wrestler, as he had been the second most important wrestler of the promotion during the Rikidozan era.

Toyonobori formed two successful tag teams with Michiaki Yoshimura and then Giant Baba, with whom he won the All Asia Tag Team Championship three more times. Yoshimura and Baba were among the young wrestlers the JWA was trying to push to the top, so they were paired with the top wrestler of the JWA, a strategy the promotion followed before pairing Toyonobori himself with the popular Rikidōzan.

On December 12, 1964, Toyonobori won the World Heavyweight Championship of Worldwide Wrestling Associates from The Destroyer at the Tokyo Gym; the title was universally recognized as a world title back then and had been held by Rikidōzan himself (it has been the first world title to be held by an Asian wrestler). Toyonobori was therefore the first Japanese wrestler to win a world title in Professional Wrestling as Rikidōzan was Korean (although the true ethnicity of Rikidōzan emerged only long after his death). WWA did not recognise the title change, while the JWA recognized it. Because of this, there were two WWA world heavyweight champions, defending their titles respectively in Japan and in the United States of America. On September 20, 1965, Toyonobori was defeated by disqualification by Luke Graham at the Los Angeles Olympic Auditorium to end the dispute over the WWA World Heavyweight Championship.

Toyonobori began losing power in the JWA, which then started pushing Giant Baba to the top of the promotion, leading him to win its top single title, the NWA International Heavyweight Championship (which had been held up after Rikidōzan's death), in 1965. After Rikidōzan's death, the JWA did not have one single title; the Japanese Heavyweight Championship, the All Asia Heavyweight Championship and the NWA International Heavyweight Championship, which were held by Rikidōzan himself, were all recognized and only the last two titles were later revived (respectively in 1968 and in 1965).

On January 5, 1966, the JWA announced the resignation and departure of Toyonobori as the company president; he was later expelled from the JWA along with Antonio Inoki on March 21, 1966.

=== Tokyo Pro Wrestling (1966–1967) ===
On April 23, 1966, Toyonobori announced the formation of Tokyo Pro Wrestling; on the same day Inoki announced his intention to join the company, as Toyonobori has privately promised Inoki to make him the promotion's top star.

On October 12, 1966, Tokyo Pro had its first card at the Sumo Hall with Inoki in the main event. However, on April 6, 1967, the JWA announced the return of Antonio Inoki to the promotion. Therefore, Tokyo Pro folded, having lost its top star.

=== International Wrestling Enterprise (1967–1970) ===
Along with most of the former Tokyo Pro wrestlers, Toyonobori joined International Wrestling Enterprise, which had been founded in the meantime on October 21, 1966, by Isao Yoshiwara and Hiro Matsuda and which had its first card in Osaka on January 5, 1967, in conjunction with Tokyo Pro. IWE then started surpassing the dominance of the JWA in Japanese wrestling.

On December 19, 1968, Toyonobori was defeated by Billy Robinson in a round-robin tournament to become the first IWA World Heavyweight Champion, the first Japanese-based world heavyweight championship in professional wrestling history.

On May 18, 1969, Toyonobori and Shozo Kobayashi, nicknamed Strong Kobayashi, defeated Ivan Strogoff and Jean Ferré in the Élysée Montmartre in Paris, France, to become the inaugural IWA World Tag Team Champions.

On February 11, 1970, Toyonobori announced his retirement at an IWE event.

=== New Japan Pro-Wrestling (1972–1973) ===
In March 1972, when Inoki left JWA to form New Japan Pro-Wrestling, Toyonobori came out of retirement to help give the promotion name value. His last match was on February 20, 1973, a win over Bruno Bekkar in Yokohama, more than three years after his original retirement ceremony.

== Death ==
Toyonobori died of heart failure on July 1, 1998, at age the of 67.

== Legacy ==
In 2024, Maple Leaf Pro Wrestling established the PWA Champions Grail, a championship merging the lineage of Toyonobori and Rikidozan's 1962 Toyonaka trophy with the Wrestling Retribution Project trophy won by Kenny Omega in Hollywood in 2011.

== Championships and accomplishments ==
- Japanese Wrestling Association
  - All Asia Tag Team Championship (7 times) - with Rikidōzan (4 times), Michiaki Yoshimura (1 time) and Giant Baba (2 times)
  - JWA World Tag Team Championship (1 time) - with Rikidōzan
  - World Big League (1964, 1965)
- International Wrestling Enterprise
  - TWWA World Tag Team Championship (1 time) - with Koji Thunder Sugiyama
  - IWA World Tag Team Championship (1 time) - with Shozo Strong Kobayashi
- Tokyo Sports
  - Achievement Award (1998)
- Worldwide Wrestling Associates
  - WWA World Heavyweight Championship (1 time) (recognized by Japanese Wrestling Association, disputed by WWA)
- Maple Leaf Pro Wrestling
  - PWA Champions Grail (1 time) - with Rikidōzan (1962, revived in 2024)

== Sumo career record ==
- Only two tournaments were held through most of the 1940s.

Toyonobori Michiharu
-	Spring Haru basho, Tokyo	Summer Natsu basho, Tokyo	Autumn Aki basho, Tokyo
1947	Not held	Shinjo; 3–2	East Jonokuchi #5; 3–3
1948	Not held	East Jonidan #18; 4–2	West Jonidan #3; 4–2
1949	East Sandanme #15; 9–3–P	West Makushita #20; 9–6	West Makushita #11; 9–6
1950	West Makushita #6; 7–8	West Makushita #6; 11–4	West Jūryō #11; 2–13
1951	East Makushita #5; 8–7	West Makushita #3; 10–5	East Jūryō #11; 7–8
1952	East Jūryō #13; 7–8	East Jūryō #14; 7–8	East Jūryō #15; 5–10
Record given as wins–losses–absences Top division champion Top division runner-up Retired Lower divisions Non-participation Sanshō key: F=Fighting spirit; O=Outstanding performance; T=Technique Also shown: ★=Kinboshi; P=Playoff(s); Divisions: Makuuchi — Jūryō — Makushita — Sandanme — Jonidan — Jonokuchi Makuuchi ranks: Yokozuna — Ōzeki — Sekiwake — Komusubi — Maegashira

-	New Year Hatsu basho, Tokyo	Spring Haru basho, Osaka	Summer Natsu basho, Tokyo	Autumn Aki basho, Tokyo
1953	East Makushita #2; 10–5	West Jūryō #15; 9–6	East Jūryō #13; 6–3–6	East Jūryō #13; 12–3; Champion
1954	West Jūryō #4; 11–4	East Maegashira #20; 9–6	East Maegashira #17; 6–4–5	East Maegashira #15; Retired; 6–9
Record given as wins–losses–absences Top division champion Top division runner-up Retired Lower divisions Non-participation Sanshō key: F=Fighting spirit; O=Outstanding performance; T=Technique Also shown: ★=Kinboshi; P=Playoff(s); Divisions: Makuuchi — Jūryō — Makushita — Sandanme — Jonidan — Jonokuchi Makuuchi ranks: Yokozuna — Ōzeki — Sekiwake — Komusubi — Maegashira

== See also ==
- List of sumo tournament second division champions
- Glossary of sumo terms
- List of past sumo wrestlers
