= Tomoya =

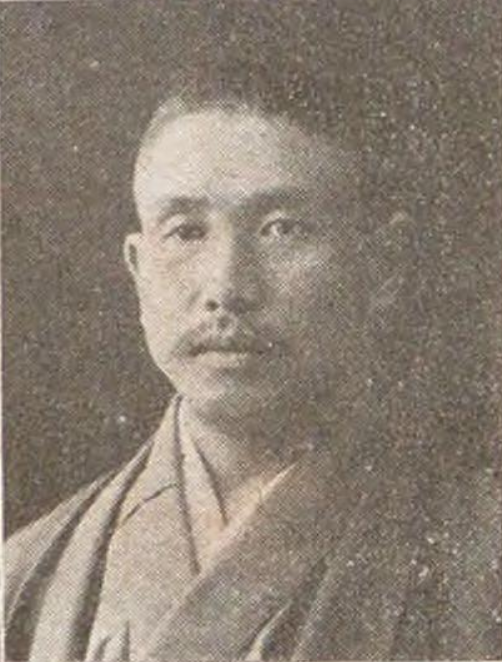
- Tomoya Ito (1873-1921), Meiji-era politician
- Pronunciation: tomoja (IPA)
- Gender: Male

Origin
- Origin: Japanese
- Meaning: Different meanings depending on the kanji used

Tomoya is a masculine Japanese given name.

== Written forms ==
Tomoya can be written using different combinations of kanji characters. Some examples:

- 友也, "friend, to be"
- 友矢, "friend, arrow"
- 友哉, "friend, how (interrogative particle)"
- 友弥, "friend, more and more"
- 友彌, "friend, more and more"
- 友八, "friend, eight"
- 友耶, "friend, question mark"
- 知也, "know, to be"
- 知矢, "know, arrow"
- 知哉, "know, how (interrogative particle)"
- 知弥, "know, more and more"
- 知八, "know, eight"
- 智也, "intellect, to be"
- 智矢, "intellect, arrow"
- 智哉, "intellect, how (interrogative particle)"
- 共也, "together, to be"
- 朋也, "companion, to be"
- 朝也, "morning/dynasty, to be"
- 朝矢, "morning/dynasty, arrow"
- 朝弥, "morning/dynasty, more and more"
- 朝彌, "morning/dynasty, more and more"

The name can also be written in hiragana ともや or katakana トモヤ.

== Notable people with the name ==
- Tomoya Fukuda (福田 友也; born 1992), Japanese footballer
- Tomoya Fukumoto (福元 友哉; born 1999), Japanese footballer
- Tomoya Haneda (羽根田 智也), Japanese rugby union player
- Tomoya Hayashi (林 友哉; born 1999), Japanese footballer
- Tomoya Higashino (東野 智弥; born 1970), Japanese basketball coach
- Tomoya Hoshi (星 知弥; born 1994), Japanese baseball player
- Tomoya Hosoda (細田 智也; born 1991), Japanese politician
- Tomoya Ichikawa (市川 友也; born 1985), Japanese baseball player
- Tomoya Inukai (犬飼 智也; born 1993), Japanese footballer
- Tomoya Inzen (隠善 智也; born 1984), Japanese baseball player
- Tomoya Ishii (石井 智也; born 1989), Japanese alpine skier
- Tomoya Ito (伊藤 智也; born 1963), Japanese Paralympic athlete
- Tomoya Ito (伊東 知也; 1873-1921), Meiji-era politician
- Tomoya Kanamori (金守 智哉; born 1982), Japanese footballer
- Tomoya Kanki (神吉 智也; born 1987), Japanese musician
- Tomoya Koyamatsu (小屋松 知哉; born 1995), Japanese footballer
- Tomoya Miguchi (三口 智也; born 1986), Japanese modern pentathlete
- Tomoya Mikami (三上 朋也; born 1989), Japanese baseball player
- Tomoya Mori (森 友哉; born 1995), Japanese baseball player
- Tomoya Nagase (長瀬 智也; born 1978), Japanese singer and actor
- Tomoya Nakamura (中村 倫也; born 1986), Japanese actor
- Tomoya Nakanishi (中西 倫也; born 1994), Japanese footballer
- Tomoya Ochiai (落合 知也; born 1987), Japanese basketball player
- Tomoya Ohtani (大谷 智哉; born 1974), Japanese composer and musician
- Tomoya Osawa (大沢 朋也; born 1984), Japanese footballer
- Tomoya Satozaki (里崎 智也; born 1976), Japanese baseball player
- Tomoya Suzuki (鈴木 智也; born 2000), Japanese footballer
- Tomoya Takahata (髙畑 智也; born 1994), Japanese footballer
- Tomoya Tamura (田村 朋也; born 1992), Japanese sprinter
- Tomoya Uchida (内田 智也; born 1983), Japanese footballer
- Tomoya Ugajin (宇賀神 友弥; born 1988), Japanese footballer
- Tomoya Wakahara (若原 智哉; born 1999), Japanese footballer
- Tomoya Warabino (蕨野 友也; born 1987), Japanese actor
- Tomoya Yagi (八木 智哉; born 1983), Japanese baseball player
- Tomoya Yamashita (山下 友也; born 1946), Japanese sport shooter

== Fictional characters ==
- Tomoya Mikami (三上 智也), protagonist of the visual novel Memories Off
- Tomoya Okazaki (岡崎 朋也), protagonist of the visual novel Clannad
- Tomoya Okita (沖田 智哉), a character in the manga series Manga Mitaina Koishitai!
- Tomoya Mashiro (真白 友也), a character from Ensemble Stars!
