= Yūya =

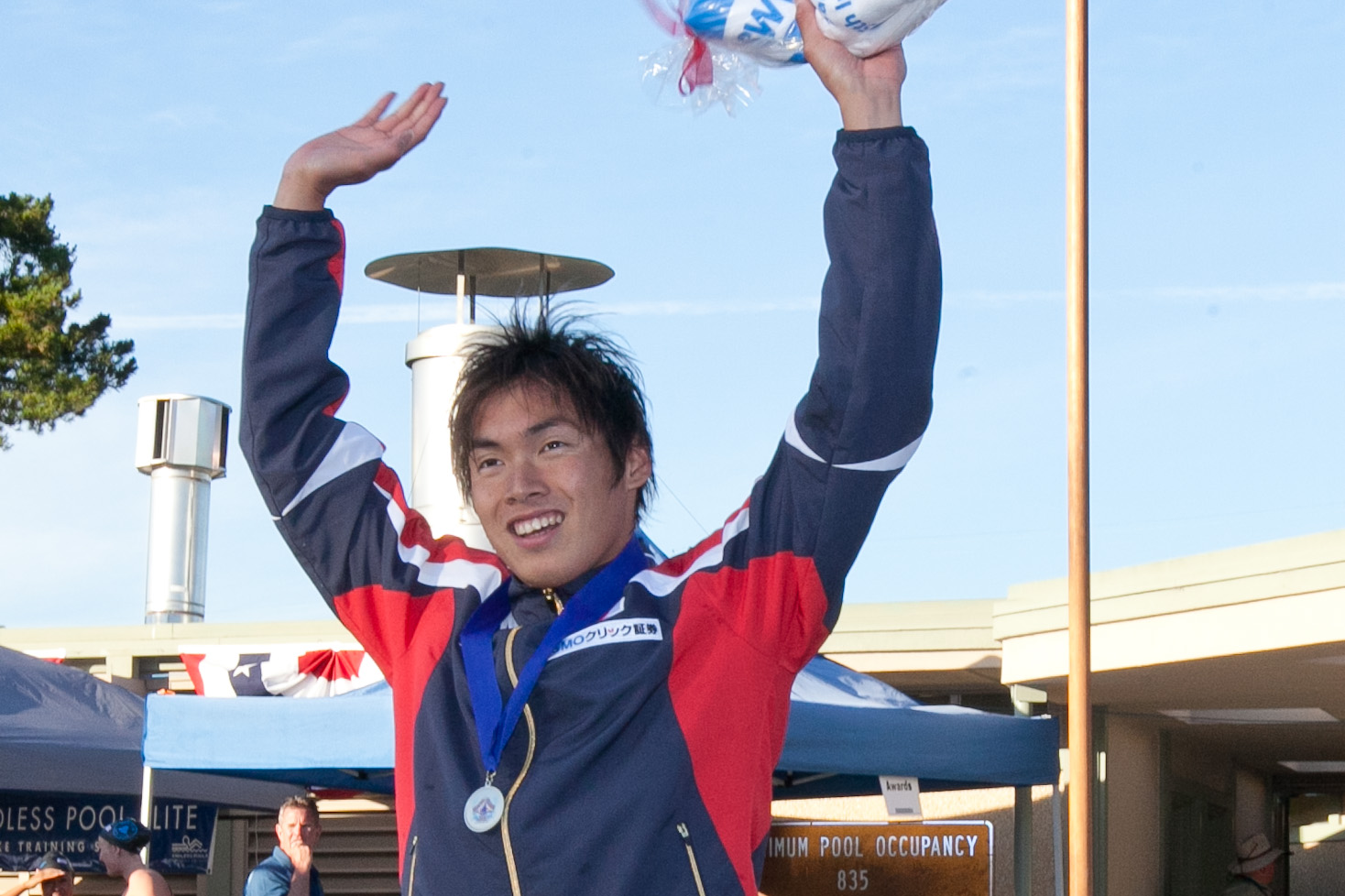
- Yuya Horihata, Japanese swimmer
- Pronunciation: /jɯːja/ (IPA)
- Gender: Male

Origin
- Origin: Japanese
- Meaning: Different meanings depending on the kanji used

Other names
- Alternative spelling: Yuya (Kunrei-shiki) Yuya (Nihon-shiki) Yūya, Yuya, Yuuya (Hepburn)

Yūya, Yuya or Yuuya is a masculine Japanese given name.

== Written forms ==
Yūya can be written using different combinations of kanji characters. Here are some examples:

- 勇也, "courage, to be"
- 悠也, "calm, to be"
- 雄也, "male, to be"
- 優也, "gentleness, to be"
- 祐也, "to help, to be"
- 佑也, "to help, to be"
- 勇矢, "courage, arrow"
- 悠矢, "calm, arrow"
- 雄矢, "male, arrow"
- 裕矢, "rich, arrow"
- 優矢, "gentleness, arrow"
- 祐矢, "to help, arrow"
- 佑矢, "to help, arrow"
- 勇哉, "courage, how (interrogative particle)"
- 悠哉, "calm, how (interrogative particle)"
- 雄哉, "male, how (interrogative particle)"
- 優哉, "gentleness, how (interrogative particle)"
- 祐哉, "to help, how (interrogative particle)"
- 佑哉, "to help, how (interrogative particle)"
- 勇弥, "courage, more and more"
- 悠弥, "calm, more and more"
- 雄弥, "male, more and more"
- 優弥, "gentleness, more and more"
- 夕夜, "evening, night"
- 友哉, "friend, how (interrogative particle)"

The name can also be written in hiragana ゆうや or katakana ユウヤ.

== Notable people with the name ==
- Yuya Ando (安藤 優也; born 1977), Japanese baseball player
- Yuya Asahina (朝比奈 ゆうや; born 1980), Japanese manga artist
- Yuya Asano (浅野 雄也; born 1997), Japanese footballer
- Yuya Hasegawa (長谷川 勇也; born 1984), Japanese baseball player
- Yuya Hashiuchi (橋内 優也; born 1987), Japanese footballer
- Yuya Hikichi (footballer, born 1983) (挽地 祐哉), Japanese footballer
- Yuya Himeno (姫野 宥弥; born 1996), Japanese footballer
- Yuya Hirose (広瀬 裕也; born 1996), Japanese voice actor
- Yuya Horihata (堀畑 裕也; born 1990), Japanese swimmer
- Yuya Ishii (baseball) (石井 裕也; born 1981), Japanese baseball player
- Yuya Ishii (director) (石井 裕也; born 1983), Japanese film director
- Yuya Iwadate (岩舘 侑哉; born 1985), Japanese footballer
- Yuya Kubo (footballer) (久保 裕也; born 1993), Japanese footballer
- Yuya Kubo (baseball) (久保 裕也; born 1980), Japanese baseball player
- Yuya Matsushita (松下 優也; born 1990), Japanese singer
- Yuya Miyashita (宮下 雄也; born 1985), Japanese singer and actor
- Yuya Nagaoka (長岡 裕也; born 1985), Japanese shogi player
- Yuya Nagasawa (長沢 祐弥; born 1996), Japanese footballer
- Yuya Nagatomi (永冨 裕也; born 1982), Japanese footballer
- Yuya Nakamura (中村 祐也; born 1986), Japanese footballer
- Yuya Niwa (丹羽 雄哉; born 1944), Japanese politician
- Yuya Odo (大戸 裕矢; born 1990), Japanese rugby union player
- Yuya Oikawa (及川 佑; born 1981), Japanese speed skater
- Yuya Onoe (尾上 勇也; born 1985), Japanese footballer
- Yuya Osako (大迫 勇也; born 1990), Japanese footballer
- Yuya Oshima (大島祐哉; born 1994), Japanese table tennis player
- Yuya Saito (斉藤 祐也; born 1977), Japanese rugby union player
- Yuya Sano (佐野 裕哉; born 1982), Japanese footballer
- Yuya Sato (footballer) (佐藤 優也; born 1986), Japanese footballer
- Yuya Sato (novelist) (佐藤 友哉; born 1980), Japanese writer
- Yuya Shirai (白井 祐矢; born 1980), Japanese mixed martial artist
- Yuya Takaki (高木 雄也; born 1990), Japanese idol, singer and actor
- Yuya Tegoshi (手越 祐也; born 1987), Japanese idol, actor and singer
- Tosayutaka Yuya (土佐豊 祐哉; born 1985), Japanese sumo wrestler
- Yuya Uchida (singer) (内田 裕也; 1939-2019), Japanese singer and actor
- Yuya Uchida (voice actor) (内田 夕夜; born 1965), Japanese actor and voice actor
- Yuya Watanabe (渡辺 雄也, born 1988), Japanese Magic: The Gathering player
- Yuya Yagira (柳楽 優弥; born 1990), Japanese actor
- Yuya Yamada (山田 裕也; born 1988), Japanese footballer
- Yuya Yamamoto (山本 優弥; born 1984), Japanese kickboxer
- Yuya Yoshida (吉田 優也; born 1989), Japanese judoka

== Fictional characters ==
- Yuya Kaido (海藤 裕哉), a character in the anime series HappinessCharge PreCure!
- Yuya Marino, a character in anime series Crush Gear Turbo
- Yuya Noda (野田 侑也), a character in the manga series Miracle Girls
- Yuya Nomoto (野本 裕也), a character in the manga series Killing Bites
- Yuya Sakaki (榊 遊矢), protagonist of the anime series Yu-Gi-Oh! Arc-V
- Yuya Shiina (椎名 ゆや), a character in the manga series Samurai Deeper Kyo
- Yuya Kizami (刻命 裕也), a character in the video game series Corpse Party
- Yuya Sakazaki (坂咲 優夜), a character in the visual novel Hatoful Boyfriend
- Yuya Haibara (灰原 ユウヤ), a character in the video game and anime series Little Battlers Experience
- Yuya Bridges (ユウヤ・ブリッジス), a character in the anime series Muv-Luv Alternative: Total Eclipse
