= Tsuneharu Sugiyama =

Japanese wrestler (1940–2002)

Tsuneharu "Thunder" Sugiyama

Personal information
- Nationality: Japanese
- Born: 23 July 1940 Itoigawa, Japan
- Died: 22 November 2002 (aged 62)

Sport
- Sport: Wrestling

Tsuneharu Sugiyama (杉山 恒治, Sugiyama Tsuneharu; 23 July 1940 – 22 November 2002) was a Japanese amateur and professional wrestler. He competed in the men's Greco-Roman heavyweight at the 1964 Summer Olympics. After his competitive career, he worked in International Wrestling Enterprise, All Japan Pro Wrestling and New Japan Pro-Wrestling under the ring name of Thunder Sugiyama, later becoming an actor and tarento until his death.

== Professional wrestling career ==
Tsuneharu Sugiyama
Personal information
- Born: Tsuneharu Sugiyama; July 23, 1940 Itoigawa, Niigata, Japan
- Died: November 22, 2002 (aged 62)

Professional wrestling career
- Ring name(s): Koji Sugiyama; Thunder Sugiyama; Tokyo Joe
- Billed height: 5 ft 10 in (178 cm)
- Billed weight: 275 lb (125 kg)
- Debut: 1965
- Retired: 1981

Along with teammate Masa Saito, who had competed in the freestyle tournament in 1964, they joined the Japan Pro Wrestling Alliance dojo. Sugiyama was given the nickname "Thunder", which he used in his debut on 4 March 1966, against Kazuo Honma. Later in the year, however, he joined Isao Yoshiwara and Hiro Matsuda in forming a new promotion, International Wrestling Enterprise.

Sugiyama was the second man to portray the "Tokyo Joe" character in North America after Mr. Hito and before fellow IWE wrestler Tetsunosuke Daigo, who debuted a few months after him in Tokyo Pro Wrestling.

In 1972 Sugiyama left IWE and went over to help Giant Baba form All Japan Pro Wrestling, where he competed until 1976. During 1977 he briefly returned to IWE, and in 1978 he moved to New Japan Pro-Wrestling, where he stayed as heel until 1980 when he retired.

Sugiyama died on 22 November 2002 of a heart attack.

== Championships and accomplishments ==
- International Wrestling Enterprise
  - IWA World Heavyweight Championship (1 time)
  - IWA World Tag Team Championship (2 times) - with Great Kusatsu and Rusher Kimura
  - TWWA World Tag Team Championship (2 times) - with Toyonobori and Rusher Kimura

== Filmography ==
Year	Title	Role	Notes
1965	Kigeki ekimae daigaku		
1976	Sister Street Fighter – Fifth Level Fist	Nick	
1978	Message from Space	Big Sam	
1983	Ryôshoku	Kurokawa	
1984	Aces Go Places Part III : Our Man from Bond Street	Oddjob	
1985	Kids		
1989	Harimao	Yasufumi Yamashita	
1994	Iruka wa umi ni kaeru		
2000	Seigi no tatsujin: Nyotai tsubo saguri		
2001	Hitozuma-tachi no seihakusho: AV ni shutsuen shita wake		
2003	Nôsatsu tenshi: Sûi tsukushite	Kageyama	
2004	Ryôjoku no tsumeato: Sakareta shitagi	Kaneda	(final film role)
