= The New Beginning (2012) =

Professional wrestling event in Osaka, Japan

- Promotional poster for the event, featuring Minoru Suzuki, Shinsuke Nakamura, Hiroshi Tanahashi, Hirooki Goto and Tetsuya Naito
- Promotion: New Japan Pro-Wrestling
- Date: February 12, 2012
- City: Osaka, Japan
- Venue: Osaka Prefectural Gymnasium
- Attendance: 6,200

Pay-per-view chronology
← Previous; Wrestle Kingdom VI in Tokyo Dome	Next → All Together: Mōikkai, Hitotsu ni Narō ze

The New Beginning chronology
← Previous; 2011	Next → 2013

New Japan Pro-Wrestling events chronology
← Previous; Wrestle Kingdom VI	Next → Wrestling Dontaku 2012

The New Beginning (2012) was a professional wrestling pay-per-view (PPV) event promoted by New Japan Pro-Wrestling (NJPW). The event took place on February 12, 2012, in Osaka, Osaka, at the Osaka Prefectural Gymnasium. The event featured eight matches, four of which were contested for championships.

It was the third event under the New Beginning name, and the first major event held by NJPW after the promotion had been sold to Bushiroad.

== Storylines ==
The New Beginning featured eight professional wrestling matches that involved different wrestlers from pre-existing scripted feuds and storylines. Wrestlers portrayed villains, heroes, or less distinguishable characters in the scripted events that built tension and culminated in a wrestling match or series of matches.

== Event ==
In the third match of the event, the No Remorse Corps (Davey Richards and Rocky Romero) recaptured the IWGP Junior Heavyweight Tag Team Championship from Apollo 55 (Prince Devitt and Ryusuke Taguchi), while Tencozy (Hiroyoshi Tenzan and Satoshi Kojima) successfully defended the IWGP Tag Team Championship against previous champions Bad Intentions (Giant Bernard and Karl Anderson). This would turn out to be the final match of Bad Intentions, the longest reigning IWGP Tag Team Champions in history, as the following month, Giant Bernard returned to WWE as "Lord Tensai". The event featured two title changes; in the first Hirooki Goto captured the IWGP Intercontinental Championship from Masato Tanaka, while in the main event Kazuchika Okada, who had just the previous month returned from a twenty-month American excursion, defeated Hiroshi Tanahashi to win the IWGP Heavyweight Championship for the first time. NJPW called the result of the main event the "upset of the century".

== Reception ==
In his review of the show, Dave Meltzer of the Wrestling Observer Newsletter criticized the decision to take the IWGP Heavyweight Championship off Hiroshi Tanahashi, writing "[t]here is very little that works well in modern wrestling, and when you've got a guy on top who is carrying the ball, it's not the time to replace him". Meltzer wrote that in Japan the general reaction to the title change was negative. Though Meltzer went on to call the match between Tanahashi and Okada "excellent", he credited it entirely to Tanahashi, writing that Okada looked "green" and "way out of his league".

== Results ==
No.	Results	Stipulations	Times
1	Chaos (Yoshi-Hashi and Yujiro Takahashi) defeated King Fale and Tomoaki Honma	Tag team match	07:51
2	Chaos (Takashi Iizuka, Tomohiro Ishii and Toru Yano) defeated Captain New Japan, Jyushin Thunder Liger and Tama Tonga	Six-man tag team match	08:35
3	No Remorse Corps (Davey Richards and Rocky Romero) defeated Apollo 55 (Prince Devitt and Ryusuke Taguchi) (c)	Tag team match for the IWGP Junior Heavyweight Tag Team Championship	15:10
4	Suzuki-gun (Lance Archer, Minoru Suzuki, Taichi, Taka Michinoku and Yoshihiro Takayama) defeated Kushida, Tiger Mask, Togi Makabe, Wataru Inoue and Yuji Nagata	Ten-man elimination tag team match	23:08
5	Tencozy (Hiroyoshi Tenzan and Satoshi Kojima) (c) defeated Bad Intentions (Giant Bernard and Karl Anderson)	Tag team match for the IWGP Tag Team Championship	17:47
6	Hirooki Goto defeated Masato Tanaka (c)	Singles match for the IWGP Intercontinental Championship	13:26
7	Tetsuya Naito defeated Shinsuke Nakamura	Singles match	17:38
8	Kazuchika Okada (with Gedo) defeated Hiroshi Tanahashi (c)	Singles match for the IWGP Heavyweight Championship	23:22
(c) / – the champion(s) heading into the match
