= Manabu Nakanishi =

Japanese professional wrestler

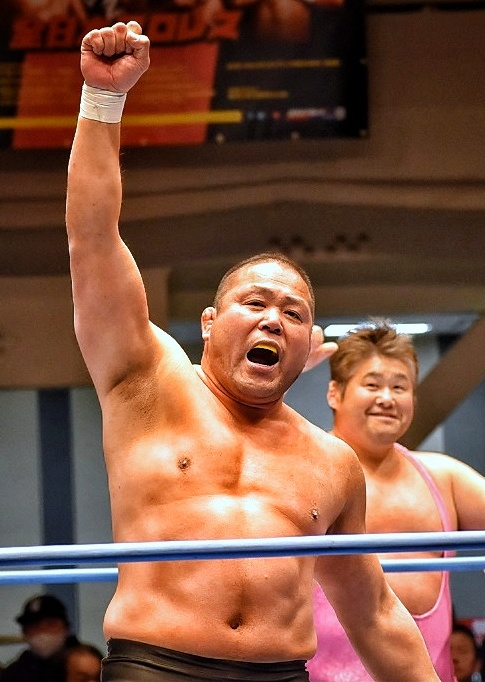
- Nakanishi in February 2020

Personal information
- Born: January 22, 1967 (age 59) Kyoto, Kyoto, Japan

Professional wrestling career
- Ring name(s): Kurasawa; Manabu Nakanishi; Mascara Don; Maybach Don; Super Strong Machine Don
- Billed height: 1.86 m (6 ft 1 in)
- Billed weight: 120 kg (265 lb)
- Billed from: Tokyo, Japan
- Trained by: Karl Gotch; Joe Malenko; Hiroshi Hase; Kensuke Sasaki
- Debut: October 13, 1992
- Retired: February 22, 2020

Manabu Nakanishi (中西 学, Nakanishi Manabu; born January 22, 1967) is a Japanese retired professional wrestler and former amateur wrestler, who was primarily associated with New Japan Pro-Wrestling (NJPW). He is a one-time IWGP Heavyweight Champion, one-time G1 Climax winner and three-time IWGP Tag Team Champion.

Nakanishi has always stayed based in NJPW, but has wrestled for various other promotions including World Championship Wrestling, All Japan Pro Wrestling, Pro Wrestling Noah and Pro Wrestling Zero1. Nakanishi's career slowly declined after a spinal injury in 2011, but he continued to wrestle for a further nine years, before retiring on February 22, 2020.

In 1992, Nakanishi won bronze in freestyle wrestling at the Asian Championships. Later that year, he competed in the 1992 Summer Olympics in Barcelona, Spain, and placed eleventh.

== Amateur wrestling career ==
Manabu Nakanishi
Medal record
Representing Japan
Men's Freestyle wrestling
Asian Championships
Bronze medal – third place	1992 Tehran	100

Manabu Nakanishi began his amateur wrestling career in 1986, competing freestyle in the 220 lbs. division.

In July 1986, Nakanishi competed in his very first tournament, the World Cup in St. John's, Newfoundland, Canada, where he placed fifth. In October 1987, he participated in the Asian Championship in Bombay, India, where he placed fifth. In June 1989, he participated in another Asian Championship in Ōarai, Ibaraki, Japan, and this time moved up to fourth place.

In September 1990, Nakanishi took part in two tournaments: On September 6, he participated in the World Championship in Tokyo, where he was placed tenth. Over three weeks later, on September 30, he participated in the Asian Games in Beijing, China, where he placed fourth. In October 1991, he took part in his second World Championship in Varna, Bulgaria, where he was placed eleventh. In April 1992, he took part in his third Asian Championship in Tehran, Iran, and was in third place, earning a bronze medal.

In his biggest tournament, Nakanishi participated in the 1992 Summer Olympics in Barcelona, Spain, where he was placed eleventh.

== Professional wrestling career ==
=== New Japan Pro-Wrestling (1992–1995) ===
Nakanishi debuted for New Japan Pro-Wrestling (NJPW) in October 1992, already taking part on NJPW's Super Grade Tag League, teaming up with Tatsumi Fujinami. The team lost all but one match, this one where they beat the combination of Jim Neidhart and Z-Man, during the whole tournament. He wrestled tag matches for the rest of his first year. Nakanishi's first single match came in February 1993, when he lost to Takayuki Iizuka. His in-ring style was very basic early in his career, as is standard for their trainees. After winning the Young Lions Cup in 1995, in order to hone his skills and bulk up, he went on an excursion to North America and joined World Championship Wrestling (WCW).

=== World Championship Wrestling (1992, 1995–1996) ===
12 days after his pro debut Nakanishi appeared at Halloween Havoc, as a spectator, sitting alongside NJPW and NWA President Seiji Sakaguchi at ringside. Three years later he returned to WCW to wrestle, under the name Kurasawa as a member of The Stud Stable led by Colonel Robert Parker. He frequently teamed with Meng, with whom he feuded against Sting and Road Warrior Hawk. He broke the arm of Hawk using a seated armbar after their tag team match at Clash of the Champions XXXI, in which they lost it was at the event that he was billed as the Terror from the Far East He subsequently feuded with Hawk when Hawk returned from injury heading into Halloween Havoc, beating many local wrestlers on their B-shows, WorldWide and Pro, as well as a big win over Sgt. Craig Pittman on Nitro. He was also known there for nearly defeating "Macho Man" Randy Savage on an episode of Nitro. It was here that Nakanishi learned the infamous "Road Warrior Workout" from Hawk and Animal, who also taught this routine to Kenta Kobashi and Kensuke Sasaki.

=== Return to NJPW (1996–2020) ===
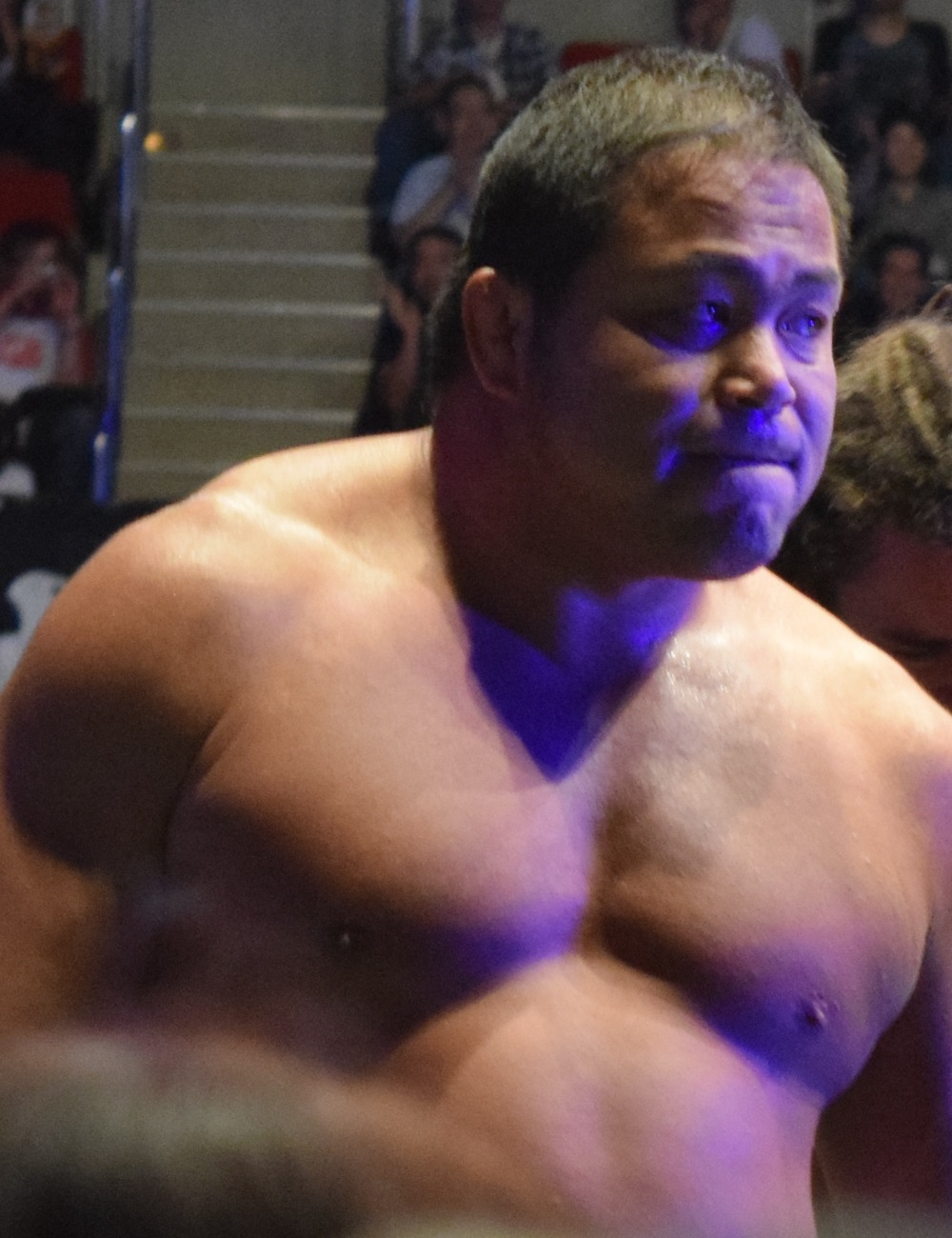
Nakanishi in September 2015

==== Return from excursion and peak career (1996–2011) ====
When Nakanishi came back to NJPW in September 1996, he appeared more confident and stronger. With his new change in attitude and in-ring style, he found instant success. He formed The Bull Powers with Satoshi Kojima, who returned from Europe. In May 1997, he and Kojima won the IWGP Tag Team Championship. He had arguably the upset win of the decade in the 1999 G1 Climax, submitting then-IWGP Heavyweight Champion and nWo Japan leader Keiji Mutoh, to win the tournament.

As the years went by, Nakanishi was never able to capitalize on his win in the G1 Climax as he constantly came up short in big matches, and Antonio Inoki's focus on pushing MMA fighters from 2002 to 2005 made matters worse for him. When the company suffered a massive exodus in main event talent (including Shinya Hashimoto, Shinjiro Otani, Sasaki, and Mutoh), it was considered that Nakanishi might finally live up to his potential, but once again he was overlooked, as NJPW started to look towards building their younger talent like Hiroshi Tanahashi, Shinsuke Nakamura, Togi Makabe, and Hirooki Goto. He formed the popular tag team, Wild Child, with Takao Omori in late 2006 and together they enjoyed another IWGP Tag Team title reign. Nakanishi finally captured the IWGP Heavyweight Championship by pinning Hiroshi Tanahashi at Dissidence on May 25, 2009. He went on to hold the title for nearly a month until losing it back to Tanahashi at Dominion 6.20. For the 2010 G1 Tag League Nakanishi formed a tag team named Muscle Orchestra with Strong Man. The team made it to the semifinals of the tournament and was at the end of the year named Tag Team of the Year by Tokyo Sports. On January 4, 2011, at Wrestle Kingdom V in Tokyo Dome, Muscle Orchestra unsuccessfully challenged Bad Intentions (Giant Bernard and Karl Anderson) for the IWGP Tag Team Championship in a three–way match, which also included Beer Money, Inc. (James Storm and Robert Roode). On February 20 at The New Beginning, Muscle Orchestra received another shot at Bad Intentions and the IWGP Tag Team Championship, but were again unable to win the title.

==== Spinal injury and final years (2011–2020) ====
On June 4 Nakanishi was injured during a six-man tag team match after taking a German suplex from Wataru Inoue. The match was stopped immediately and Nakanishi was stretchered out of the arena in a neckbrace. The following day it was announced that Nakanishi had suffered a spinal cord injury, which resulted in numbness and temporary paralysis, but was expected to make a full recovery.

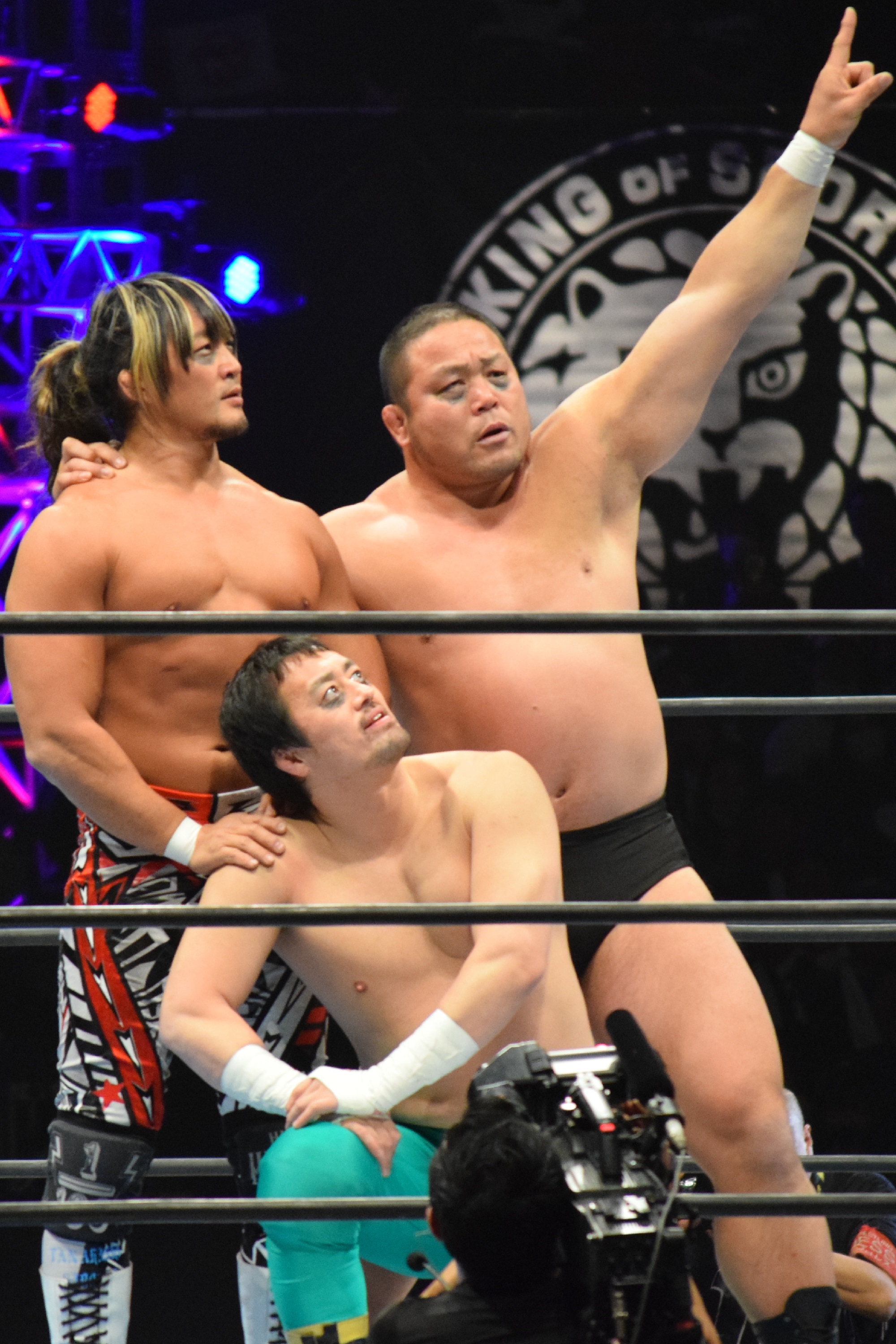
Nakanishi, Hiroshi Tanahashi and Ryusuke Taguchi in February 2017

Nakanishi returned to the ring on October 8, 2012, at King of Pro-Wrestling, where he teamed with Strong Man and Yuji Nagata in a losing effort against the team of Takashi Iizuka, Tomohiro Ishii and Toru Yano. From November 20 to December 1, Muscle Orchestra reunited to take part in the round-robin portion of the 2012 World Tag League, finishing with a record of two wins and four losses, finishing second to last in their group. On January 4, 2013, at Wrestle Kingdom 7 in Tokyo Dome, Nakanishi teamed with Strong Man, Akebono and MVP in an eight-man tag team match, where they defeated Chaos (Bob Sapp, Takashi Iizuka, Toru Yano and Yujiro Takahashi). On April 7 at Invasion Attack, Nakanishi debuted his new finisher, the Uekara Don!, to gain a victory for his team consisting of him, Akebono, Hiroyoshi Tenzan and Super Strong Machine, defeating the Chaos faction of Bob Sapp, Takashi Iizuka, Tomohiro Ishii and Yoshi-Hashi. On May 3 at Wrestling Dontaku 2013, Nakanishi and Strong Man received a shot at the IWGP Tag Team Championship in a four-way match with the defending champions, K.E.S. (Lance Archer and Davey Boy Smith Jr.), as well as Chaos (Takashi Iizuka and Toru Yano) and Tencozy (Hiroyoshi Tenzan and Satoshi Kojima). Kojima pinned Strong Man to win the match and the title. On June 22 at Dominion 6.22, Nakanishi unsuccessfully challenged Rob Conway for the NWA World Heavyweight Championship. From November 24 to December 6, Nakanishi and Strong Man took part in the 2013 World Tag League, where they finished second to last in their block with a record of two wins and four losses, failing to advance to the semifinals. Nakanishi spent the majority of 2014 and 2015 working the undercard and in multiple man tag matches, teaming with Yuji Nagata during the 2014 World Tag League, failing to advance from their block. On August 19, 2015, Nakanishi donned a mask and going as Maybach Don, teamed up with Nagata (as Maybach Blue Justice) and Maybach Taniguchi to win the Arukas Cup 6-Man Tag Tournament hosted by Pro Wrestling Noah.

On January 5, 2017, Nakanishi, Hiroshi Tanahashi and Ryusuke Taguchi defeated Los Ingobernables de Japón (Bushi, Evil and Sanada) for the NEVER Openweight 6-Man Tag Team Championship. On March 25, 2018, Nakanishi made an appearance in All Japan, where he reunited Wild Child for one night with Takao Omori to unsuccessfully challenge Jun Akiyama and Yuji Nagata for the All Asia Tag Team Championship. After teaming with young lion Henare the year prior, Nakanishi reunited with Yuji Nagata for the 2018 World Tag League, finishing second-last in a 14-team block with 3 wins and 10 losses, earning 6 points. They would team once more in what would be Nakanishi's last World Tag League, finishing in last place in a 16-team block with 2 wins and 13 losses, earning 4 points.

Nakanishi would say farewell to the Tokyo Dome on January 4, 2020, after losing a pre-show tag team match with longtime partner Yuji Nagata against Tencozy, being pinned by Satoshi Kojima following a lariat. Nakanishi would announce his retirement three days later, scheduling it for a February 22 Korakuen Hall show. Nakanishi had said that 'As a result of a neck injury [that he had sustained in 2011], I haven't been able to wrestle to the level I wanted, and rather than drag things out, I wanted to draw a line in the sand.'

== Personal life & other media ==
Nakanishi hosted his own variety show called Nakanishi Land on TV Asahi where he cooks traditional Japanese food, play sports, complete challenges alongside special guests that are fellow wrestlers or legends, like Kuniaki Kobayashi, Seiji Sakaguchi, Hiroshi Tanahashi, Yuji Nagata and others.

After Nakanishi's retirement, he lost a considerable amount of weight and mass that had been built throughout his wrestling career. As of April 2026, he weighs in at 99.7 kilograms (220 lb), which is considerably lower than his billed weight of 120 kilograms (265 lb).

== Championships and accomplishments ==
- DDT Pro-Wrestling
  - Ironman Heavymetalweight Championship (1 time)
- New Japan Pro-Wrestling
  - IWGP Heavyweight Championship (1 time)
  - IWGP Tag Team Championship (3 times) – with Satoshi Kojima (1), Yuji Nagata (1) and Takao Ōmori (1)
  - NEVER Openweight 6-Man Tag Team Championship (1 time) – with Hiroshi Tanahashi and Ryusuke Taguchi
  - Interim IWGP Tag Team Championship (1 time) – with Takao Omori
  - G1 Climax (1999)
  - Young Lion Cup (1995)
  - Triathlon Survivor Tournament Winner (2002) – with Osamu Nishimura and Yutaka Yoshie
  - Naeba Cup Tag Team Tournament Winner (2003) – with Heat
  - Fighting Spirit Award (2000, 2002)
  - Tag Team Best Bout (2000) with Yuji Nagata vs. Hiroyoshi Tenzan and Satoshi Kojima on October 9
  - Tag Team Best Bout (2002) with Osamu Nishimura vs. Hiroyoshi Tenzan and Masahiro Chono on June 5
- Nikkan Sports
  - Fighting Spirit Award (1999)
- Pro Wrestling Illustrated
  - PWI ranked him #185 of the top 500 singles wrestlers in the PWI 500 in 2010
- Pro Wrestling Noah
  - Arukas Cup 6-Man Tag Tournament (2015) – with Maybach Blue Justice and Maybach Taniguchi
- Pro Wrestling Zero1-Max
  - NWA Intercontinental Tag Team Championship (1 time) – with Takao Ōmori
  - Best Bout (2008) vs. Masato Tanaka on April 6
- Tokyo Sports
  - Best Tag Team Award (2010) with Strong Man
  - Fighting Spirit Award (1999)

== Mixed martial arts record ==
Professional record breakdown
1 match	0 wins	1 loss
By knockout	0	1
By submission	0	0
By decision	0	0

Res.	Record	Opponent	Method	Event	Date	Round	Time	Location	Notes
Loss	0-1	Kazuyuki Fujita	TKO (punches)	NJPW Ultimate Crush	May 2, 2003	3	1:09	Tokyo, Japan	

== Kickboxing record ==
Kickboxing record
0 wins (0 KOs), 1 loss
Date	Result	Opponent	Event	Location	Method	Round	Time	Record
July 29, 2003	Loss	Toa	K-1 Beast II 2003	Saitama, Japan	KO (right punch)	1	1:38	0-1
Legend: Win Loss Draw/No contest
