= Taka Michinoku =

Japanese professional wrestler (born 1973)

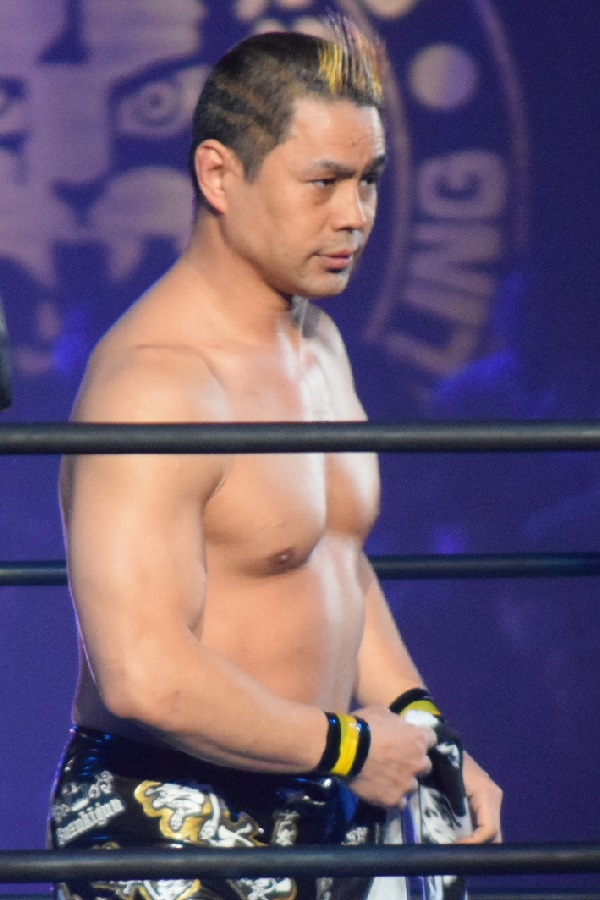
- Michinoku in February 2017

Personal information
- Born: Takao Yoshida; October 26, 1973 (age 53) Morioka, Japan

Professional wrestling career
- Ring name(s): Pepe Michinoku; Piza Michinoku; Taka; Taka Michinoku; Takako Michinoku
- Billed height: 5 ft 8 in (173 cm)
- Billed weight: 201 lb (91 kg)
- Trained by: The Great Sasuke; Gran Hamada
- Debut: September 4, 1992

Takao Yoshida (吉田 貴男, Yoshida Takao; born October 26, 1973), better known by his ring name Taka Michinoku (TAKAみちのく; stylized as TAKA Michinoku), is a Japanese professional wrestler, trainer, and former mixed martial artist. He primarily appears for New Japan Pro-Wrestling. He was a member of Suzuki-gun from 2011 until its disbandment in 2022. He was then a member of Just 5 Guys from 2023 until its disbandment in 2025. He established the promotion JTO in 2019.

Michinoku became known in North America for his work for the WWF (now WWE), where he was the inaugural WWF Light Heavyweight Champion. He is the founder and former head of Kaientai Dojo (now Active Advance Pro Wrestling), where he also primarily wrestled until 2019. Having held championship titles all around Asia, Europe, and North America, he is known for his long title reigns.

Michinoku held the FMW Independent World Junior Heavyweight Title for a combined duration of more than 15 months, the WWF Light Heavyweight Title for a record-setting 10 months, and the WEW Six-Man Tag Team Title for almost a year. He held the World Junior Heavyweight Championship, Michinoku Pro Tohoku Junior Heavyweight Championship, and Kaientai Dojo Strongest-K Championship simultaneously for almost 10 months.

== Early life ==
Takao Yoshida was born in Morioka on October 26, 1973.

== Professional wrestling career ==
=== Early career (1992–1997) ===
Yoshida was trained by The Great Sasuke and Gran Hamada. He adopted the ring name Taka Michinoku out of respect for The Great Sasuke, who was the owner of Michinoku Pro Wrestling and had also used "Michinoku" as part of his ring name. He debuted at a Wrestling International New Generations and Michinoku Pro Wrestling joint event on September 4, 1992, teaming up with The Great Sasuke in a losing effort against Super Delfin and Terry Boy. He would later move to Federacion Universal De Lucha Libre and debuted by teaming with Buffalo Chohe to defeat Mongolian Yuga and Shiryu. He debuted for Frontier Martial-Arts Wrestling in a six-man tag team match at Summer Spectacular in 1993 and would primarily compete at MPW, UWF, and FMW in his early career.

His debut for New Japan Pro-Wrestling came during Super J-Cup 1994 and was eliminated from the competition in the first round by Black Tiger. He competed in Best of the Super Juniors 1994 and only gained two points therefore losing the tournament. He also went up against Super Delfin for the CMLL World Welterweight Championship and had a J-Crown Title #1 Contendership match with Koji Kanemoto, both of which he lost.

Michinoku's first title reign came in the form of the FMW Independent Junior Heavyweight Championship, which he won by defeating Koji Nakagawa on May 5, 1996. He would lose the title to El Satanico after holding the title for one year and one month and defeating fellow young wrestlers Minoru Tanaka, Naohiro Hoshikawa and Hayato Nanjyo, he would later regain the championship two months later. He would vacate the championship to focus on the WWF Light Heavyweight Championship.

=== Extreme Championship Wrestling (1997, 1999) ===
Michinoku made his ECW and American debut on February 14, 1997, in a match where he teamed with Dick Togo & Terry Boy to defeat Gran Hamada, Gran Naniwa & The Great Sasuke. This three on three feud lasted until ECW Barely Legal 1997 Gran Hamada, Masato Yakushiji & The Great Sasuke would defeat the trio. This was also Michinoku's first pay per view appearance. After this Michinoku left the company to join the World Wrestling Federation.

In 1999 Michinoku would return at ECW Cyberslam 1999 defeating Papi Chulo. He also wrestled Super Crazy at Hardcore Heaven 1999. Other matches include two tag matches teaming with Yoshihiro Tajiri, a Hardcore Heaven rematch with Super Crazy ending In another victory for Super Crazy, a loss against Jerry Lynn & his last two matches for ECW was in the form of two wins against Mosco de la Merced.

=== Consejo Mundial de Lucha Libre (1997) ===
While competing in ECW and then in WWF, Michinoku also had a run in CMLL in 1997, competing as a tecnico. In that period, two other Japanese wrestlers wrestled in Consejo Mundial de Lucha Libre, namely Ultimo Dragon and Yoshihiro Tajiri. Michinoku fought between the others The Headhunters and Val Venis, at the time using the mask of Steele. In the summer of 1997, both Taka Michinoku and Yoshihiro Tajiri moved to World Wrestling Federation.

=== World Wrestling Federation (1997–2001) ===
==== Light Heavyweight Champion (1997–1998) ====
He made his World Wrestling Federation (WWF) debut on July 6, 1997, at the WWF pay-per-view In Your House 16: Canadian Stampede losing to The Great Sasuke but getting a huge reaction from the crowd. He lost a rematch to Sasuke the following night on Raw. Taka was part of the Light Heavyweight division. He was entered in the WWF Light Heavyweight Title Tournament where the winner would become the first WWF Light Heavyweight Champion, he beat Devon Storm in the quarterfinal, Aguila in the semifinal. On December 7, 1997, Michinoku defeated Brian Christopher at D-Generation X: In Your House to become the first WWF Light Heavyweight Champion recognized by the WWF. Taka successfully defended the WWF Light Heavyweight Title at No Way Out of Texas: In Your House against Pantera, at WrestleMania XIV against Aguila and against multiple different opponents on Raw is War and Shotgun Saturday Night. After holding the title for more than 10 months, Michinoku lost the title to Christian at Judgment Day: In Your House on October 18.

==== Kaientai (1998–2001) ====
Taka started to become "Americanised" and on Raw, he teamed with Bradshaw and segments where shown of Taka and Bradshaw doing generalised and stereotyped American activities. He was attacked by Kai En Tai for unknown reasons, and their alliance with Taka in Japan was not mentioned. Taka began feuding with Kai En Tai. Michinoku would team up with Bradshaw to take on Dick Togo, Mens Teioh & Shoichi Funaki at Over the Edge: In Your House only to be defeated. He would then also team up with The Headbangers to defeat Togo, Teioh & Funaki at King of the Ring. With Kai En Tai also feuding with Val Venis the pair teamed up to take on Togo and Funaki in a tag team match, Taka made a swerve, however, by turning against Venis, proclaiming that Mrs. Yamaguchi-San was his sister. Venis was dragged backstage by Kaientai to be castrated, though the audience did not see what happened next. A few weeks later Michinoku was involved in a gauntlet match with Togo, Teioh and Funaki to defeat Venis. Michinoku once again teamed up with Togo, Teioh and Funaki to go against The Oddities (Giant Silva, Golga & Kurrgan) at SummerSlam 1998 only to lose the match. With Kai En Tai in 1998 he had multiple chances to become a champion, going up against Christian and Duane Gill for the WWF Light Heavyweight Championship and X-Pac for the WWF European Championship.

After Togo, Teioh and both Yamaguchis left the WWF, Michinoku and Funaki began wrestling as a tag team using the name Kaientai. They were primarily comedy jobbers, best known for their "Indeed!" skits in which voices in English were dubbed by Bruce Prichard into their promos while they badly lip-synced. Their first tag team match together came in the form of a loss to the Hardy Boyz. At WrestleMania 2000 the pair were part of a hardcore battle royal for the WWF Hardcore Championship, Funaki even became the Hardcore champion for a small amount of time however Michinoku never held the title. Taka's biggest venture in WWF came when he challenged Triple H for the WWF Championship on the April 10, 2000 edition of Raw, coming up short despite interference on his behalf from Funaki and the Acolytes Protection Agency. In 2000 they had a chance to become the number one contenders for the WWF World Tag Team Championship in a number one contendership battle royal in which The APA won. In 2001 Kaientai took on the Dudley Boyz for the WWF Tag Team Championship but failed to capture them. In 2000 and 2001 Michinoku had multiple opportunities to become the WWF Light Heavyweight Champion taking on Dean Malenko, Jeff Hardy and others. In their last match together Michinoku and Funaki defeated Justin Credible and Raven on the October 20, 2001 edition of WWF Jakked. Michinoku suffered a shoulder injury and left the WWF in late 2001.

=== Kaientai Dojo (2002–2019) ===
After departing from the WWF in late 2001 Michinoku returned to Japan to rehabilitate a serious shoulder injury.

On May 19, 2002, Michinoku debuted for Kaientai Dojo at K-Dojo New Talent Presentation where Michinoku had several matches with four new K-Dojo talents and won all four matches. In June, Michinoku took part in CLUB-K Super Take tournament and would be knocked out by Daigoro Kashiwa. In March 2003, Michinoku teamed up with Mr. X5 to take part in UWA/UWF Intercontinental Tag Team Championship number one contendership tournament and were eliminated in the second round by MIYAWAKI and Ofune.

On January 10, 2005, Michinoku defeated Kaz Hayashi for the Strongest-K Championship, the highest honor one can achieve in Kaientai Dojo. Michinoku started a feud with Kazma, which led to several championship matches between the two where Michinoku would come out on top. He would go on to beat Bambi in the finals of Strongest-K 2005. The beginning of 2006 proved to be a problem for Michinoku as on January 6, 2006, he would lose the Strongest-K Championship to JOE, holding the championship for almost one year and making him the longest Strongest-K Champion up to that point.

However, after losing the championship, a few months later on June 4, 2006, Michinoku teamed up with TOMO Michinoku to beat Shiori Asahi and Makoto Oishi to win the WEW Hardcore Tag Team Championship and would lose the championship to Apple Miyuki and YOSHIYA almost a month later on July 8. K-DOJO was separated into two distinct sides, GET and RAVE, which ran separate shows but often joined during large shows and tours and GET was led by Taka Michinoku while RAVE's leader was Hi69. Michinoku participated in the GET block of Strongest-K 2006, Michinoku gained four points and therefore did not progress forward. Michinoku teamed up with TAKU Michinoku to take part in a four-way match for the WEW Hardcore Tag Team Championship and lost.

2007 kicked of for Michinoku in the form of a New Year battle royal, which was won by Boso Boy Raito. Michinoku teamed up with Kazma to take part in the GET block part of K-DOJO Tag League 2007, the pair reached the final before being eliminated by Makoto Oishi and Shiori Asahi. After Hi69's departure, Taka Michinoku became commissioner of RAVE and 296 became commissioner of GET. On April 22, 2007, RAVE ran its last show; the two brands merged and now run joint shows. Michinoku would go on to win Strongest-K 2007 after defeating Yuji Hino in the final. With this win, he went on to take on Strongest-K champion Kengo Mashimo in September and lost.

Michinoku would bounce back from this defeat by teaming up with JOE and defeated Kengo Mashimo and Madoka to become the Strongest-K Tag Team Champions in November. Michinoku and JOE would begin calling themselves Handsome. At the same time Michinoku and Dick Togo became the IWGP Junior Heavyweight Tag Team Champions for New Japan Pro-Wrestling and Handsome and Strongest-K Tag Team Championship was put on the back burner somewhat. In the beginning of 2008 Handsome took part in K-DOJO Tag Tag League 2008 and were eliminated in the first round by Kazma and Yuji Hino. During this time, Michinoku and Togo lost their championship and Handsome would compete a lot more because of it. They would defend their championship against other factions such as Omega and Gekirin. However, on June 20, 2008, Handsome would lose the Strongest-K Tag Team Championship to Omega's Kazma and Miyawaki. Handsome would regain the championship a few months later on August 31. They would lose it to Omega once again with Makoto Oishi & Shiori Asahi defeating them on December 14. Handsome would take part in K-DOJO Tag Team League 2009 but didn't progress further. Michinoku won Strongest-K next challenger tournament and went on to beat Kengo Mashimo to become a two time Strongest-K Champion. Michinoku finally lost the championship to his longtime rival Kazma on October 10, 2009. In late 2009, Handsome went separate ways.

Michinoku teamed up with Taishi Takizawa in K-DOJO Tag League 2010 and reached the final before being eliminated by Daigoro Kashiwa and Kengo Mashimo and would lose to Kengo Mashimo again in Strongest-K 2010. Michinoku would be part of multiple number one contendorship matches for the Strongest-K Championship and also participated in Strongest-K tournament 2011 but lost all. Michinoku and Quiet Storm took on Ryuichi Sekine & Saburo Inematsu in a match for the Strongest-K Tag Team Championship and lost. Michinoku teamed with Kengo Mashimo to become the Strongest-K Tag Team Champions and would go on to win the K-DOJO Tag League 2012. Michinoku and Kengo teamed with Isami Kodaka to become the Chiba 6 Man Tag Team Champions. They would lose the Strongest-K Tag Team Championship to Saburo Inematsu and Yuji Hino. He would lose to Taishi Takizawa in the semifinal of Kaio Tournament. On October 14, 2012, Michinoku celebrated his twentieth anniversary in professional wrestling with a six-man tag team match, where he, Cima and Funaki were defeated by Minoru Suzuki, Nosawa Rongai and Taichi. On April 14, 2013, Michinoku defeated Yuki Sato to win the UWA World Middleweight Championship for the first time. On May 11, he defeated Nanjyo Hayato in a title vs. title match to also win the Independent World Junior Heavyweight Championship for the third time. Michinoku lost the UWA title to Ryuichi Sekine on August 11. On November 10, he once again became a double champion, when he and Kaji Tomato defeated Kazma Sakamoto and Kengo Mashimo for the Strongest-K Tag Team Championship. They, however, lost the title to Hiroshi Fukuda and Shiori Asahi just six days later. Michinoku and Tomato regained the title from Fukuda and Asahi on January 26, 2014. On March 2, Michinoku and Tomato lost the title to Hiroki and Yuji Hino. On September 6, Michinoku lost the Independent World Junior Heavyweight Championship to Teppei in his seventeenth title defense. On July 12, 2015, Michinoku won the Strongest-K Tag Team Championship alongside Men's Teioh.

In November 2018, it was revealed Michinoku had maintained an extramarital relationship with a woman for eight years, prompting K-Dojo to fire him and enforce a one-year payment suspension. On January 22, 2019, he left the promotion to work as a freelancer.

=== All Japan Pro Wrestling (2003–2010, 2017) ===
Michinoku debuted for All Japan Pro Wrestling in August 2003. `He would quickly join the stable called Roughly Obsess and Destroy (RO&D). He would regularly team up with The Gladiator and Gigantes, which led to Michinoku and Gigantes gaining a shot at the World Tag Team Champions Arashi and Keiji Muto on September 6 at AJPW Summer Action Series II. Michinoku would go on to team up with D'Lo Brown to take part in World's Strongest Tag Determination League 2003 and gained a total of six points, not enough to progress to the next stage. At AJPW Excite Series 2004, Michinoku took on Kaz Hayashi in a match for the vacant World Junior Heavyweight Championship, which Hayashi won. On January 10, 2005, Michinoku took on Hayashi in an all or nothing match where the Strongest-K Championship and World Junior Heavyweight Championship were on the line and Michinoku won. With this win and many more successes, RO&D would dominate AJPW, which led to an AJPW vs RO&D best of three falls match, which RO&D won. Michinoku teamed up with RO&D honorary member PSYCHO to take part in All Asia Tag Team Championship tournament and reached the second round before being eliminated by Katsuhiko Nakajima and Tomoaki Honma. On October 22, 2005, Michinoku would lose the World Junior Heavyweight Championship to Shuji Kondo. Michinoku would team up with RO&D enemy Kaz Hayashi to take part in World's Strongest Tag Determination League 2006 but with only five points the pair didn't progress to the next stage. Michinoku gained only four points in the AJPW Junior League 2006 and therefore didn't progress. In late 2006, RO&D disbanded. After RO&D Michinoku participated in World's Strongest Tag Determination League 2006 and teamed up with former RO&D member Taiyo Kea and gained only five points and didn't progress further.

Pepe Michinoku (Taka Michinoku), El Nosawa Mendoza, and Miguel Hayashi Jr formed a team during the AJPW Champion Carnival called Mexico Amigos. El Hijo del Araya Segundo (Nobutaka Araya) joined the team after Six-Man Action between Mexico Amigos and Araya/Fuchi/Hirai at the Carnival's final show. After multiple bouts against Minoru Suzuki, Nosawa (NOSAWA Rongai) offered Suzuki an invitation into Mexico Amigos, to which he declined. This resulted in the group changing multiple assets. Their name was changed to Mexico Amigos Black, the previous worn Mexican Flag attire became Black and Gold attire, and Nobutaka Araya was kicked out of the group. At the AJPW's December 16, 2007 "Fan Appreciation Day" show, The Mexico Amigos teamed with "Ray Suzuki" and defeated Ryuji Hijikata, Kikutaro, T28 and Ryuji Yamaguchi. After the match, Ray Suzuki revealed himself as Minoru Suzuki and stated the starting next year he would throw his Amigos tights away and return to Nosawa Rongai, then kidnapped him to start early training. This led to Pepe and Miguel stating they would return to Mexico, but Kaz and Taka would return come the new year. After one last "Viva Mexico" Mexico Amigos disbanded.

Between 2008 and 2009, Michinoku would sporadically compete at All Japan, which included Nobutaka Araya retirement show. In 2010, he lost to Kaz Hayashi in a match for the World Junior Heavyweight Championship and would also participate in AJPW Junior League 2010. At AJPW Summer Explosion 2017, Michinoku made his return to AJPW and won the All Asia Tag Team Championship with Black Tiger VII.

=== New Japan Pro-Wrestling (2007–present) ===
In the beginning of 2007, Michinoku would team up sporadically at New Japan events with Kaientai Dojo wrestler Dick Togo. On May 2, 2007, Michinoku and Togo would beat tag team legends Gedo and Jado to become the new IWGP Junior Heavyweight Tag Team Champions. The pairing would defend the championships on both New Japan events but also Kaientai events too. Although holding the championships for several months, Michinoku and Togo would rarely compete for New Japan and only wrestled in matches for the championships, however, the pair would still regularly compete for Kaientai Dojo. After several defences against the likes of Koji Kanemoto and Wataru Inoue, the pair finally lost the championships to Control Terrorism Unit members Prince Devitt and Minoru.

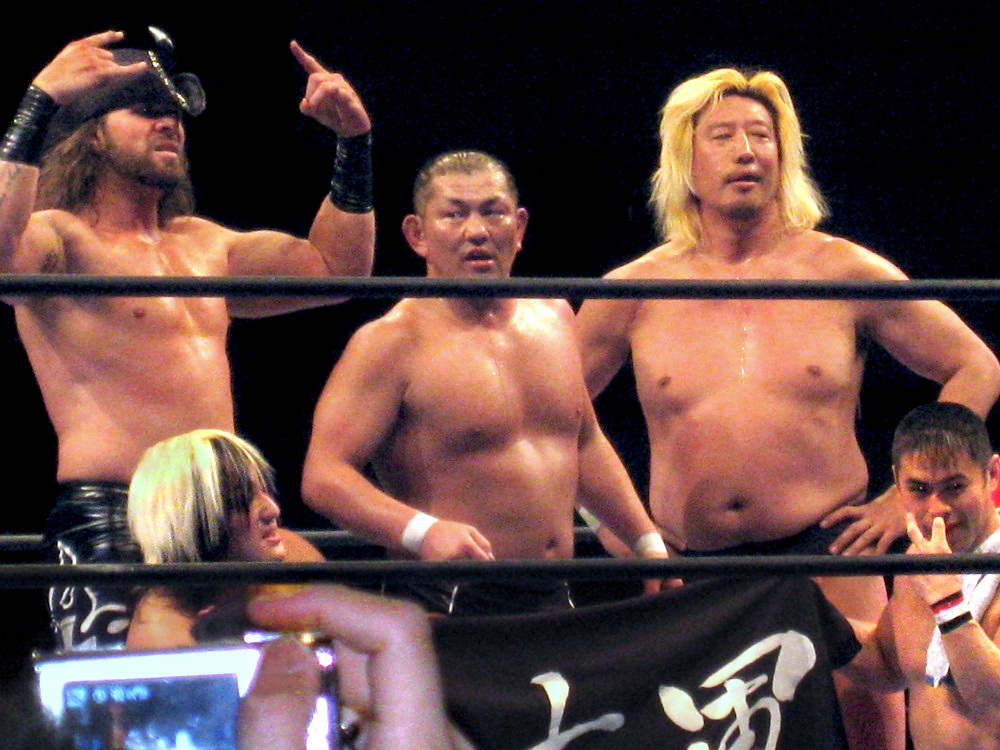
Michinoku with Suzuki-gun in February 2012

In late 2010, Michinoku returned to New Japan and began teaming up with Satoshi Kojima, Nosawa Rongai and Taichi to form Kojima-gun in early 2011. On February 20, 2011, at The New Beginning, Michinoku took on Prince Devitt for the IWGP Junior Heavyweight Championship, which Devitt retained. Michinoku teamed up with Taichi to take on Devitt and Ryusuke Taguchi for the IWGP Junior Heavyweight Tag Team Championship and lost. After Satoshi Kojima lost the IWGP Heavyweight Championship to Hiroshi Tanahashi at Wrestle Kingdom V, Kojima suffered another big loss against longtime rival Togi Makabe on May 3 and following the match, Michinoku and Taichi entered the ring and attacked Kojima, who quickly took care of both of them. This led to the surprise return of freelancer Minoru Suzuki, who appeared behind Kojima and locked him in a sleeper hold, before leaving the ringside area with Michinoku and Taichi, who proclaimed Suzuki as their new leader and renamed the stable "Suzuki-gun". Michinoku participated in Best Of The Super Juniors XVIII and gained eight points but not enough to progress to the semifinal. Michinoku and Taichi became a tag team in New Japan's junior heavyweight tag team division. On September 11, 2011, the pair would take on Apollo 55 for the IWGP Junior Heavyweight Championship and for the second time running lost. At Power Struggle, Michinoku for the second time took on Devitt for the IWGP Junior Heavyweight Championship and for the second time lost. At Wrestle Kingdom VI in Tokyo Dome, Michinoku and Taichi teamed up with Atlantis and Valiente to lose to Jyushin Thunder Liger, Kushida, Máscara Dorada and Tiger Mask.

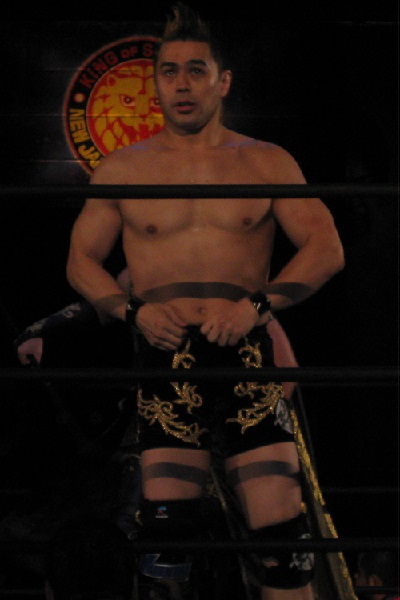
Michinoku in September 2014

Both Michinoku and Taichi participated in Best of the Super Juniors XIX, however, neither progressed to the semifinal. After their elimination from the tournament, Michinoku and Taichi had set their sights on the IWGP Junior Heavyweight Tag Team Championship, but were, on June 16 at Dominion 6.16, defeated by Jyushin Thunder Liger and Tiger Mask in a match for the vacant championship. In August, Michinoku and Taichi began blaming each other for their recent losses, which led to the two agreeing to a match, where the loser would be expelled from Suzuki-gun. The match took place on August 22 at Michinoku's Kaientai Dojo promotion, but ended without a winner as Minoru Suzuki interrupted the match and got the two men to make peace with each other. Taka and Taichi participated in Super Junior Tag Tournament 2012 and made it to the semifinal before losing to the Time Splitters (Alex Shelley and Kushida). From late May to early June 2013, Michinoku took part in the 2013 Best of the Super Juniors. After originally failing to advance from his block, Michinoku was given a spot in the semifinals, after original block winner Ryusuke Taguchi suffered a hip injury. He was eliminated from the tournament in the semifinals on June 9 by Alex Shelley. On July 20, Michinoku and Taichi received another shot at the IWGP Junior Heavyweight Tag Team Championship, but were defeated by the defending champions, the Forever Hooligans (Alex Koslov and Rocky Romero). On September 29 at Destruction, Michinoku and Taichi failed to earn another shot at the IWGP Junior Heavyweight Tag Team Championship, when they were defeated in a number one contender's match by Time Splitters. However, when Alex Shelley was sidelined with an injury, Michinoku and Taichi were given the title shot and, on October 14 at King of Pro-Wrestling, defeated the Forever Hooligans to become the new IWGP Junior Heavyweight Tag Team Champions. Michinoku and Taichi made their first successful title defense on November 1, defeating Gedo and Jado at their self-produced independent event. After a reign of 26 days, Michinoku and Taichi lost the title to The Young Bucks (Matt Jackson and Nick Jackson) on November 9 at Power Struggle.

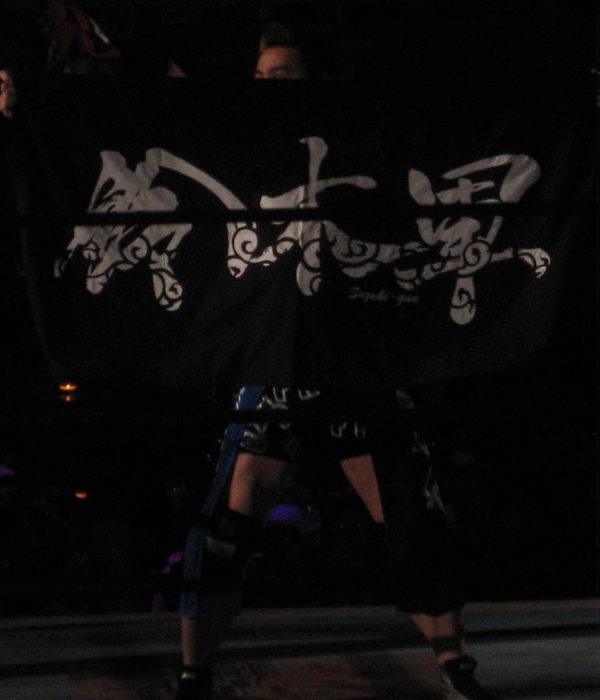
Michinoku holding the Suzuki-gun banner in March 2014

In January 2015, Suzuki-gun entered a storyline, where the entire stable invaded the Pro Wrestling Noah promotion. Michinoku and El Desperado won the GHC Junior Heavyweight Tag Team Championship on March 15 by defeating Choukibou-gun (Hajime Ohara and Kenoh) and No Mercy (Daisuke Harada and Genba Hirayanagi) in a three-way match. They lost the title to Atsushi Kotoge and Daisuke Harada in their fifth defense on October 4. Suzuki-gun's Noah invasion storyline concluded in December 2016, which led to the stable's return to NJPW on January 5, 2017. In May, Michinoku took part in the 2017 Best of the Super Juniors, where he finished second to last in his block with a record of two wins and five losses. From March 2018 until May 2019, he was the manager and occasional tag team partner of Zack Sabre Jr.

In May 2019, Michinoku participated in the 2019 Best of the Super Juniors. Going winless in his first 5 matches, he injured his ankle during his 6th match against Shingo Takagi. He would then forfeit his remaining matches, finishing the tournament with 0 wins and 9 losses. Michinoku would disappear shortly after to focus on starting his new promotion, Professional Wrestling Just Tap Out.

In November 2021, through the NJPW website, it was announced that Michinoku would return after 2 years and 6 months away to participate into the World Tag League tournament, with his partner being his "boss" and teammate Minoru Suzuki. The duo finished their Tag League campaign at the bottom of the block with 0 points, failing to win a single match. On January 4, 2022, at night one of Wrestle Kingdom 16, Michinoku competed in the New Japan Rambo but failed to last till the final 4.

In March, Michinoku competed in the New Japan Cup, losing to Cima in the first round. Michinoku continued to team with his Suzuki-gun stablemates for the remainder of the year in mainly tag-team matches. In December 2022, at the World Tag League & Best of the Super Juniors finals, Minoru Suzuki announced the disbandment of Suzuki-gun by the end of the year. The final match between the faction took place on December 23, where the team of Taichi, Sabre Jr, Kanemaru and Douki defeated Suzuki, Archer, Desperado and Michinoku. After the match, each of the Suzuki-gun members spoke about their memories as a part of the group and thanked leader Suzuki. The night ended with all members posing with the Suzuki-gun flag, only to be interrupted by former member Takashi Iizuka, causing all 9 men to pose in the ring, behind the Suzuki-gun flag, which was raised by Michinoku.

=== Professional Wrestling Just Tap Out (2019-present) ===
On April 12, 2019, Michinoku announced that he would be creating a new promotion called Professional Wrestling Just Tap Out (JTO). It held its first show at Korakuen Hall on July 8, 2019, where Michinoku was defeated by Minoru Suzuki. Although the second and later rounds were delayed due to the COVID-19 pandemic, Michinoku won the Only Give Up Tournament by defeating Hayato Tamura on August 14, 2020.

== Championships and accomplishments ==
- All Japan Pro Wrestling
  - All Asia Tag Team Championship (1 time) – with Black Tiger VII
  - World Junior Heavyweight Championship (1 time)
- DDT Pro-Wrestling
  - KO-D Tag Team Championship (1 time) – with Francesco Togo
- El Dorado Wrestling
  - UWA World Trios Championship (1 time) – with Antonio Honda and Francesco Togo
  - UWA World Trios Championship Determination Tournament (2008) - with Antonio Honda and Francesco Togo
- Frontier Martial Arts Wrestling
  - FMW Independent World Junior Heavyweight Championship (2 times)
- Professional Wrestling Just Tap Out
  - Only Give Up Tournament (2020)
  - King of JTO Championship (1 time, inaugural)
- Kaientai Dojo
  - Chiba Six Man Tag Team Championship (1 time) – with Isami Kodaka and Kengo Mashimo
  - FMW/WEW Hardcore Tag Team Championship (1 time) – with TOMO Michinoku
  - Independent World Junior Heavyweight Championship (3 times)
  - Strongest-K Championship (2 times)
  - Strongest-K Tag Team Championship (6 times) – with Handsome Joe (2), Kengo Mashimo (1), Kaji Tomato (2), and Men's Teioh (1)
  - UWA/UWF Intercontinental Tag Team Championship (1 time) – with Ryota Chikuzen
  - UWA World Middleweight Championship (2 times)
  - Strongest-K Number #1 Contenders Tournament (2004)
  - Strongest-K Tournament (2007)
  - Strongest-K Next Challenger Tournament (2009)
  - Tank Nagai Tag Team Tournament (2017) - with MEN's Teioh
  - Tag Team Match of the Year (2013) with Kaji Tomato vs. Kazma Sakamoto and Kengo Mashimo on November 10
- Michinoku Pro Wrestling
  - Tohoku Junior Heavyweight Championship (1 time)
- New Japan Pro-Wrestling
  - IWGP Junior Heavyweight Tag Team Championship (2 times) – with Dick Togo (1) and Taichi (1)
- Pro Wrestling Illustrated
  - Ranked No. 22 of the top 500 singles wrestlers in the PWI 500 in 1998
  - Ranked him #191 of the 500 best singles wrestlers during the "PWI Years" in 2003
- Pro Wrestling Noah
  - GHC Junior Heavyweight Tag Team Championship (1 time) – with El Desperado
- Tokyo Sports
  - Technique Award (2005)
- World Entertainment Wrestling
  - WEW Six Man Tag Team Championship (1 time) - with Gosaku Goshogawara and Tetsuhiro Kuroda
- World Wrestling Federation
  - WWF Light Heavyweight Championship (1 time)
  - WWF Light Heavyweight Championship Tournament (1997)
