= Jon Andersen =

American professional wrestler, bodybuilder, strongman

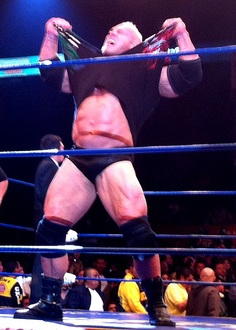
- Andersen as "Jon Strongman" during a CMLL event.

Personal information
- Born: Jon Andersen-Reel; January 8, 1972 (age 54) San Francisco, California, U.S.

Professional wrestling career
- Ring name(s): Jon Andersen; Jon Strongman; Strong Man; Jon Rekon
- Billed height: 6 ft 0 in (183 cm)
- Billed weight: 309 lb (140 kg)
- Trained by: APW Bootcamp, Pro Wrestling Revolution
- Debut: 2003
- Retired: 2016

Competition record

Strongman

Representing United States

IFSA Pan-American Championships
7th	2005

IFSA Strongman World Team Championships
2nd	2005 Team Pan-America

IFSA Holland Grand Prix
2nd	2006

North America's Strongest Man
1st	2003

America's Strongest Man
7th	2003
5th	2004
2nd	2006

World Muscle Power Championships
8th	2004

World Strongman Challenge
3rd	2006
3rd	2007

Strongest Man Alive
3rd	2004

X-TREME Strongman Showdown
4th	2004

World's Strongest Nation
3rd	2005

Ukraine Open
2nd	2006

St Patrick's Day Festival
3rd	2006
3rd	2007

U.S. National Strongman Championships
2nd	2006

All Nations Strength Challenge
4th	2003
3rd	2004

Jon Andersen-Reel, normally referred to simply as Jon Andersen (born January 8, 1972) is an American professional wrestler, bodybuilder, and former professional strongman competitor. Andersen has wrestled for Pro Wrestling Revolution based in California, Consejo Mundial de Lucha Libre (CMLL) in Mexico and Japanese promotions Inoki Genome Federation (IGF) and New Japan Pro-Wrestling (NJPW).

== Professional wrestling career ==
=== Early career (2003-2009) ===
Andersen trained for his professional wrestling career in the All Pro Wrestling (APW) Bootcamp, making his debut in 2003. From 2003 until 2007 he wrestled only part-time to focus on his bodybuilding and strongman career and primarily for APW. By 2008 he began making regular appearances for California-based Pro Wrestling Revolution (PWR) promotion as a "Special feature" due to his enormous size. He also worked tours of Japan, wrestling for Antonio Inoki's Inoki Genome Federation (IGF) in both 2008 and 2009. He received further training between 2008 and 2009 in Pro Wrestling Revolution by Vaquero Fantasma to prepare him for his work in Mexico.

=== Consejo Mundial de Lucha Libre (2009–2011) ===
In September 2009, Andersen signed a contract to wrestle for the Mexico City, Mexico based Consejo Mundial de Lucha Libre (CMLL) promotion and made his debut for the company on October 5, 2009, using the name "Jon Strongman". The storyline used to introduce Jon Strongman to CMLL was that Shocker found him while on tour with Pro Wrestling Revolution as the first member of his faction Los Guapos ("The good looking ones"). In his debut Strongman teamed with Shocker and Héctor Garza to defeat El Terrible, El Texano, Jr. and Ray Mendoza, Jr. In the months after his debut Strongman began a storyline feud with Último Guerrero, holder of the CMLL World Heavyweight Championship. The storyline heated up after Último Guerrera was accidentally knocked unconscious during a match with Jon Strongman and CMLL decided to write it into the storyline between the two.

Strongman appeared at CMLL's Sin Salida event on December 4, 2009, teaming with Místico and Héctor Garza to defeat Guerrero, Atlantis and Mr. Niebla, his first appearance at a major CMLL event. On March 1, 2010, Strong Man defeated Último Guerrero in the main event of a Puebla, Puebla show, after which último Guerrero offered to defend his championship against Jon Strongman. A title match has not yet been announced between the two.

=== Lucha Libre USA (2010–2013) ===
On November 20, 2010, Strong Man teamed with Misterioso II to defeat Vaquero Fantasma and Oliver John for the PWR Tag Team Championship, Andersen's first professional wrestling title.

On January 22, 2011, Andersen made his debut for Lucha Libre USA. In the promotion he performs under the ring name "The Firewall" Jon Rekon and represents rudo group The Right. On June 18, 2011, Rekon and his stablemate in The Right, Petey Williams, defeated the Latin Liberators (Rocky Romero and Super Nova) to win the vacant LLUSA Tag Team Championship.

=== New Japan Pro-Wrestling (2010–2013) ===
On March 14, 2010, Andersen, billed as Strong Man, entered New Japan Pro-Wrestling's (NJPW) 2010 New Japan Cup, but was defeated in the first round by Hiroshi Tanahashi. On July 11 New Japan announced that Strong Man would return to the company in August to take part in the 2010 G1 Climax tournament. After winning two out of his seven matches in the tournament, Strong Man finished seventh out of the eight wrestlers in his block and didn't advance in the tournament. On October 22, 2010, Inoue and Nagata entered the 2010 G1 Tag League. Strong Man returned to New Japan in late October 2010 to team with Manabu Nakanishi in the 2010 G1 Tag League. After four wins and a loss, Strong Man and Nakanishi, known collectively as Muscle Orchestra, finished second in their block and advanced to the semifinals, where, on November 7, they were defeated by No Limit (Tetsuya Naito and Yujiro Takahashi). In recognition of their achievement, Tokyo Sports named Strong Man and Nakanishi the Tag Team of the Year for 2010. On January 4, 2011, Muscle Orchestra returned to New Japan at Wrestle Kingdom V in Tokyo Dome, where they unsuccessfully challenged Bad Intentions (Giant Bernard and Karl Anderson) for the IWGP Tag Team Championship in a three-way match, which also included Beer Money, Inc. (James Storm and Robert Roode). On February 20 at The New Beginning, Muscle Orchestra received another shot at Bad Intentions and the IWGP Tag Team Championship, but were unable to win the title.

In August, Strong Man returned to New Japan to take part in the 2011 G1 Climax. After losing his first seven matches, Strong Man finished the tournament by picking up big wins over Minoru Suzuki and Hirooki Goto, although still finishing last in his block. Strong Man returned to New Japan on October 22 to take part in the 2011 G1 Tag League, forming the tag team Muscle Pavilion with Tama Tonga as his regular partner Manabu Nakanishi was sidelined with an injury. After one win and four losses, the team was eliminated from the tournament. Strong Man started his next tour with New Japan on April 21, 2012. Strong Man returned to New Japan on October 8, 2012, at King of Pro-Wrestling to take part in Manabu Nakanishi's return match, where the two and Yuji Nagata were defeated by Takashi Iizuka, Tomohiro Ishii and Toru Yano. From November 20 to December 1, Muscle Orchestra reunited to take part in the round-robin portion of the 2012 World Tag League, finishing with a record of two wins and four losses, finishing second to last in their group. On January 4, 2013, at Wrestle Kingdom 7 in Tokyo Dome, Strong Man teamed with Nakanishi, Akebono and MVP in an eight-man tag team match, where they defeated Chaos (Bob Sapp, Takashi Iizuka, Toru Yano and Yujiro Takahashi). On May 3 at Wrestling Dontaku 2013, Strong Man and Nakanishi received a shot at the IWGP Tag Team Championship in a four-way match with the defending champions, K.E.S. (Lance Archer and Davey Boy Smith, Jr.), as well as Chaos (Takashi Iizuka and Toru Yano) and Tencozy (Hiroyoshi Tenzan and Satoshi Kojima). Kojima pinned Strong Man to win the match and the title. From November 24 to December 6, Strong Man and Nakanishi took part in the 2013 World Tag League, where they finished second to last in their block with a record of two wins and four losses, failing to advance to the semifinals.

=== Inoki Genome Federation (2014) ===
Andersen made his debut for Inoki Genome Federation on August 30, 2014 temaign with Bob Sapp defeating Atsushi Sawada and Shogun Okamoto in Pyongyang, North Korea.

=== Return to New Japan Pro-Wrestling (2016) ===
Andersen returned to New Japan on November 11, 2016 when he defeated Charlie Roberts.

== Championships and accomplishments ==
- Lucha Libre USA
  - LLUSA Tag Team Championship (1 time) – with Petey Williams
- Pro Wrestling Illustrated
  - Ranked No. 236 of the top 500 wrestlers in the PWI 500 in 2011
- Pro Wrestling Revolution
  - PWR Tag Team Championship (1 time) – with Misterioso II
- Tokyo Sports
  - Best Tag Team Award (2010) – with Manabu Nakanishi

== Strongman career ==
Jon's strongman career began in 2002, winning the New Mexico's Strongest Man show, and he quickly earned his pro status by winning the Azelea Festival in 2003. Also in 2003, Jon won the North America's Strongest Man competition, his career best win. Jon joined the ranks of the IFSA strongman organization in 2005, placing 7th at the Pan-American Championships, and taking 2nd place at the IFSA World Team Championships along with teammates Travis Ortmayer, Geoff Dolan and Van Hatfield.

== Personal records ==
(All lifts done raw with only a weight belt)

- Bench Press: 565x3
- Close-Grip Bench Press: 545
- Push Press: 365x6, 275x20
- Squat: 775x3, 500x25, 405x37
- Deadlift: 700x4, 500x21
- Box Jump: 50"
- Vertical Jump: 35"

== Other media ==
In 2015, Andersen appeared in the documentary "Lucha Mexico" with fellow wrestlers Shocker, Perro Aguayo Jr., and Sexy Star.
