= The New Beginning (2011) =

Japanese wrestling event

The New Beginning (2011) was a series of two professional wrestling pay-per-view (PPV) events promoted by New Japan Pro-Wrestling (NJPW). The events took place on February 15 and 20, 2011. The first was held in Tokyo at Korakuen Hall and the second in Sendai, Miyagi, at the Sendai Sun Plaza Hall. They were the first events held under the New Beginning name.

== Storylines ==
Both of the New Beginning events featured nine professional wrestling matches that involved different wrestlers from pre-existing scripted feuds and storylines. Wrestlers portrayed villains, heroes, or less distinguishable characters in the scripted events that built tension and culminated in a wrestling match or series of matches.

== February 15 ==
The New Beginning (2011)
- Promotion: New Japan Pro-Wrestling
- Date: February 15, 2011
- City: Tokyo, Japan
- Venue: Korakuen Hall
- Attendance: 1,500

The New Beginning chronology
← Previous; First	Next → 2011

The first event, which mainly built to matches on the second event, featured nine matches. During the event, the IWGP Tag Team Champions Giant Bernard and Karl Anderson defeated their upcoming challengers Manabu Nakanishi and Strong Man in singles matches. In the main event, IWGP Heavyweight Champion Hiroshi Tanahashi and IWGP Junior Heavyweight Champion Prince Devitt defeated their upcoming challengers, Kojima-gun representatives Satoshi Kojima and Taka Michinoku.

=== Results ===
No.	Results	Stipulations	Times
1	Chaos (Tetsuya Naito, Tomohiro Ishii and Yujiro Takahashi) defeated Hirooki Goto, Jyushin Thunder Liger and Tiger Mask	Six-man tag team match	08:49
2	Kota Ibushi and Kushida defeated Gedo and Jado	Tag team match	12:24
3	Karl Anderson defeated Manabu Nakanishi	Singles match	10:27
4	Giant Bernard defeated Strong Man	Singles match	06:06
5	Ryusuke Taguchi and Togi Makabe defeated Kojima-gun (Nosawa Rongai and Taichi)	Tag team match	07:09
6	Wataru Inoue defeated Toru Yano	Singles match	09:37
7	Yuji Nagata defeated Takashi Iizuka by disqualification	Singles match	13:24
8	Shinsuke Nakamura defeated Hiroyoshi Tenzan	Singles match	08:24
9	Hiroshi Tanahashi and Prince Devitt defeated Kojima-gun (Satoshi Kojima and Taka Michinoku)	Tag team match	15:47

== February 20 ==
The New Beginning (2011)
- Promotional poster for the event
- Promotion: New Japan Pro-Wrestling
- Date: February 20, 2011
- City: Sendai, Japan
- Venue: Sendai Sun Plaza Hall
- Attendance: 3,200

Pay-per-view chronology
← Previous; Wrestle Kingdom V in Tokyo Dome	Next → New Japan Cup

The New Beginning chronology
← Previous; 2011	Next → 2012

New Japan Pro-Wrestling events chronology
← Previous; Wrestle Kingdom V	Next → Wrestling Dontaku

The third match of the event saw Tiger Mask and Tomohiro Ishii conclude their storyline rivalry in a Mask vs. Mask match; for the match, Ishii donned a Black Tiger mask. All three champions retained their titles during the event; Bad Intentions (Giant Bernard and Karl Anderson) successfully defended the IWGP Tag Team Championship against Muscle Orchestra (Manabu Nakanishi and Strong Man), Prince Devitt successfully defended the IWGP Junior Heavyweight Championship against Taka Michinoku and Hiroshi Tanahashi successfully defended the IWGP Heavyweight Championship against previous champion Satoshi Kojima. The event saw the NJPW debut of former WWE wrestler MVP. He was originally scheduled to team with Nosawa Rongai, however, just prior to the event, Nosawa was arrested for stealing a taxi and later announced he was taking a break from professional wrestling.

=== Results ===
No.	Results	Stipulations	Times
1	Tama Tonga defeated Hiromu Takahashi	Singles match	05:20
2	Jyushin Thunder Liger, Kushida and Ryusuke Taguchi defeated Chaos (Gedo, Jado and Killer Rabbit)	Six-man tag team match	08:45
3	Tiger Mask defeated Tomohiro Ishii	Mask vs. Mask match	08:45
4	Chaos (Shinsuke Nakamura, Takashi Iizuka, Toru Yano and Yujiro Takahashi) defeated Hiroyoshi Tenzan, King Fale, Wataru Inoue and Yuji Nagata	Eight-man elimination tag team match	21:41
5	Bad Intentions (Giant Bernard and Karl Anderson) (c) defeated Muscle Orchestra (Manabu Nakanishi and Strong Man)	Tag team match for the IWGP Tag Team Championship	18:28
6	Prince Devitt (c) defeated Taka Michinoku	Singles match for the IWGP Junior Heavyweight Championship	13:17
7	Kojima-gun (MVP and Taichi) defeated G.B.H. (Togi Makabe and Tomoaki Honma)	Tag team match	11:29
8	Hirooki Goto defeated Tetsuya Naito	Singles match	17:36
9	Hiroshi Tanahashi (c) defeated Satoshi Kojima	Singles match for the IWGP Heavyweight Championship	22:22
(c) / – the champion(s) heading into the match
