= Wrestle Kingdom VI =

2012 PPV event in Tokyo, Japan

- Promotional poster for the event, featuring various NJPW wrestlers
- Promotion: New Japan Pro-Wrestling
- Date: January 4, 2012
- City: Tokyo, Japan
- Venue: Tokyo Dome
- Attendance: 43,000 (official); 23,000 (claimed)

Pay-per-view chronology
← Previous; New Japan Alive	Next → The New Beginning

Wrestle Kingdom chronology
← Previous; V	Next → 7

New Japan Pro-Wrestling events chronology
← Previous; Power Struggle	Next → The New Beginning

Wrestle Kingdom VI in Tokyo Dome (レッスルキングダムVI in 東京ドーム, Ressuru Kingudamu VI in Tōkyō Dōmu) was a professional wrestling pay-per-view (PPV) event produced by the New Japan Pro-Wrestling (NJPW) promotion, which took place at the Tokyo Dome in Tokyo, Japan on January 4, 2012. It was the 21st January 4 Tokyo Dome Show and the sixth held under the "Wrestle Kingdom" name. This was the final Wrestle Kingdom where a Roman numeral was used as part of the event's name. The event featured twelve matches (including one dark match), three of which were contested for championships.

Outside participants from the All Japan Pro Wrestling (AJPW), Consejo Mundial de Lucha Libre (CMLL) and Pro Wrestling Noah promotions also took part in the show. Following the conclusion of a working relationship between NJPW and the American Total Nonstop Action Wrestling (TNA), the show, for the first time in five years, did not feature wrestlers from TNA.

== Production ==
Other on-screen personnel
Role:	Name:
Commentators	Shinji Yoshino
Commentators	Shinpei Nogami
Ring announcers	Kimihiko Ozaki
Referees	Kenta Sato
Referees	Marty Asami
Referees	Red Shoes Unno
Referees	Tiger Hattori

=== Background ===
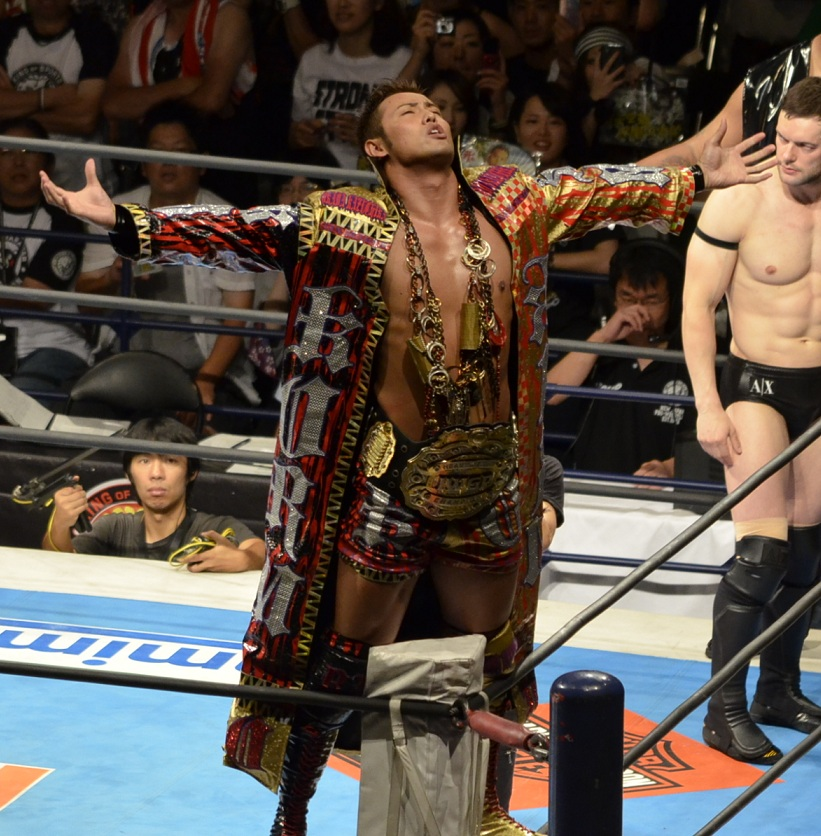
The show is notable for featuring the NJPW return of Kazuchika Okada and the debut of his "Rainmaker" persona

Wrestle Kingdom VI featured the NJPW return of Kazuchika Okada. Okada was a rookie in 2010, when NJPW, through their international connections, sent him to the American Total Nonstop Action Wrestling (TNA) promotion to gain experience and grow as a wrestler. During his one and a half years in TNA, Okada did little of note; he was dressed up like Kato from The Green Hornet, dubbed "Okato" and made Samoa Joe's sidekick in an angle with D'Angelo Dinero, wrestling only a handful of actual matches. TNA's poor handling of Okada was one of the key factors in NJPW ceasing their relationship with the American promotion, which made Wrestle Kingdom VI the first Tokyo Dome show in five years to not feature any wrestlers from the company. On December 9, 2011, NJPW announced that Okada would return to the promotion at Wrestle Kingdom VI, facing Yoshi-Hashi, who was making his own return from the Mexican Consejo Mundial de Lucha Libre (CMLL) promotion, with whom NJPW also had a working relationship, where, unlike Okada, he had been wrestling a full schedule and improving. Upon his return to NJPW, Okada created himself a new villainous persona named "Rainmaker".

=== Storylines ===
Wrestle Kingdom VI featured twelve professional wrestling matches that involved different wrestlers from pre-existing scripted feuds and storylines. Wrestlers portrayed villains, heroes, or less distinguishable characters in the scripted events that built tension and culminated in a wrestling match or series of matches.

== Event ==
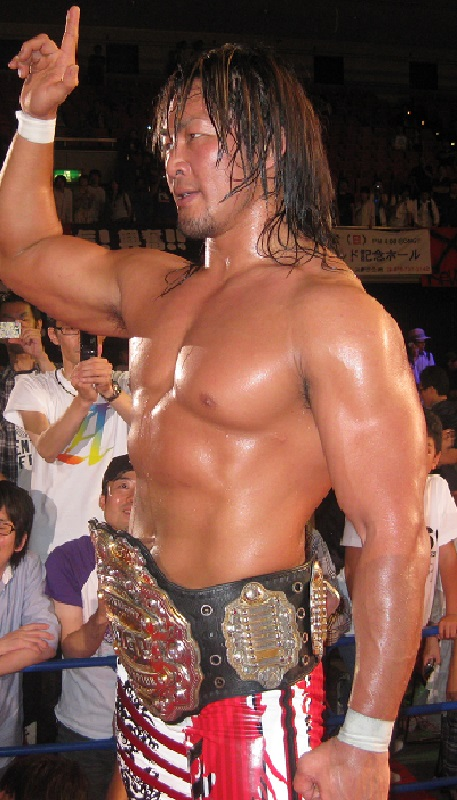
Hiroshi Tanahashi, who defended the IWGP Heavyweight Championship in the main event of the show

The main event of the show saw Hiroshi Tanahashi defeat Minoru Suzuki to make his 11th successful defense of the IWGP Heavyweight Championship, setting a new record for most title defenses in the process. The semi-main event saw All Japan Pro Wrestling (AJPW) representative Keiji Mutoh defeat Tetsuya Naito in a battle between two wrestlers dubbed "geniuses". The show also featured two matches, where NJPW wrestlers took on Pro Wrestling Noah wrestlers. In the first, NJPW's Hirooki Goto defeated Noah's Takashi Sugiura, while in the second Noah's Go Shiozaki and Naomichi Marufuji defeated NJPW's Shinsuke Nakamura and Toru Yano. There were also two other title matches at the show, which saw Tencozy (Hiroyoshi Tenzan and Satoshi Kojima) defeat Bad Intentions (Giant Bernard and Karl Anderson) to become the new IWGP Tag Team Champions and Apollo 55 (Prince Devitt and Ryusuke Taguchi) defeat No Remorse Corps (Davey Richards and Rocky Romero) to become the new IWGP Junior Heavyweight Tag Team Champions.

In their NJPW return match, Kazuchika Okada defeated Yoshi-Hashi in quick fashion. Following the main event of the show, Okada confronted Tanahashi and challenged him to a match for the IWGP Heavyweight Championship. The event also featured a match that saw NJPW's Wataru Inoue and Yuji Nagata take on AJPW's mixed martial arts duo of Masakatsu Funaki and Masayuki Kono in what marked Funaki's first NJPW match in 20 years. Intended as a starting point in a rivalry between Nagata and Funaki, the match ended in a "disaster", when Nagata crushed Funaki's face with a knee strike, legitimately breaking his nose and left orbital bone. The injury required surgery and sidelined Funaki for six months.

== Reception ==
Dave Meltzer of the Wrestling Observer Newsletter was positive in his review of the show, offering particular praise to Hiroshi Tanahashi, whom he credited with bringing a new audience to NJPW, comparing him to John Cena as someone who has the "aura of a top guy". Meltzer wrote that "[w]hile most sports are declining in popularity in Japan, New Japan Pro Wrestling has started making small steps in growing over the past three years". Meltzer highlighted Kazuchika Okada as part of the show that did not work, writing that he did not look impressive and was "completely unconvincing" in his new role as a "cocky playboy".

== Aftermath ==
A month after Wrestle Kingdom VI, Kazuchika Okada defeated Hiroshi Tanahashi at The New Beginning to become the new IWGP Heavyweight Champion in what NJPW called the "upset of the century". The general reaction in Japan to the title change was negative. Dave Meltzer was also negative on the title change, writing that Okada looked "green" and was hard to take seriously as either a main eventer or a title threat. By the time Okada lost the title the following June, Meltzer wrote that he had silenced his critics, writing that his reign "[had] to be considered, in hindsight, a success far beyond what anyone could have reasonably hoped for". During the following years, Okada established himself as one of the biggest stars in Japanese professional wrestling, becoming a multi-time winner of both the IWGP Heavyweight Championship and NJPW's premier tournament, the G1 Climax.

== Results ==
No.	Results	Stipulations	Times
1^{D}	Captain New Japan and Tama Tonga defeated Kyosuke Mikami and Tomoaki Honma	Tag team match	08:47
2	Apollo 55 (Prince Devitt and Ryusuke Taguchi) defeated No Remorse Corps (Davey Richards and Rocky Romero) (c)	Tag team match for the IWGP Junior Heavyweight Tag Team Championship	12:44
3	Jyushin Thunder Liger, Kushida, Máscara Dorada and Tiger Mask defeated Atlantis, Taichi, Taka Michinoku and Valiente	Eight-man tag team match	10:18
4	Kazuchika Okada defeated Yoshi-Hashi	Singles match	04:37
5	Stack of Arms (Masakatsu Funaki and Masayuki Kono) defeated Seigigun (Wataru Inoue and Yuji Nagata)	Tag team match	06:34
6	MVP and Shelton Benjamin defeated Complete Players (Masato Tanaka and Yujiro Takahashi) (with Gedo and Jado)	Tag team match	09:41
7	Tencozy (Hiroyoshi Tenzan and Satoshi Kojima) defeated Bad Intentions (Giant Bernard and Karl Anderson) (c)	Tag team match for the IWGP Tag Team Championship	12:40
8	Hirooki Goto defeated Takashi Sugiura	Singles match	12:35
9	Togi Makabe defeated Yoshihiro Takayama	Singles match	09:15
10	Go Shiozaki and Naomichi Marufuji defeated Chaos Top Team (Shinsuke Nakamura and Toru Yano)	Tag team match	15:10
11	Keiji Mutoh defeated Tetsuya Naito	Singles match	22:35
12	Hiroshi Tanahashi (c) defeated Minoru Suzuki	Singles match for the IWGP Heavyweight Championship	25:59
(c) / – the champion(s) heading into the match; D / – this was a dark match
