= Bad Intentions (professional wrestling) =

Professional wrestling tag team

Tag team
- Members: Giant Bernard; Karl Anderson
- Name: Bad Intentions
- Billed heights: Anderson: 1.84 m (6 ft 1/2 in); Bernard: 1.98 m (6 ft 6 in)
- Combined billed weight: 259 kg (571 lb)
- Debut: October 20, 2008
- Disbanded: February 12, 2012
- Years active: 2008–2012

Bad Intentions (バッドインテンションズ, Baddointenshonzu) was the professional wrestling tag team of American wrestlers Giant Bernard and Karl Anderson. The team was formed in the New Japan Pro-Wrestling (NJPW) promotion in October 2008 and reached its first major accomplishment in November 2009 by winning the G1 Tag League. From June 19, 2010, to January 4, 2012, Bad Intentions held the IWGP Tag Team Championship for a record 564 days, while also setting the new record for most successful title defenses with ten. During the reign, the team also won Pro Wrestling Noah's GHC Tag Team Championship. After losing both titles, Bad Intentions disbanded, when Bernard left NJPW to return to the WWE.

== History ==
=== Formation (2008–2009) ===
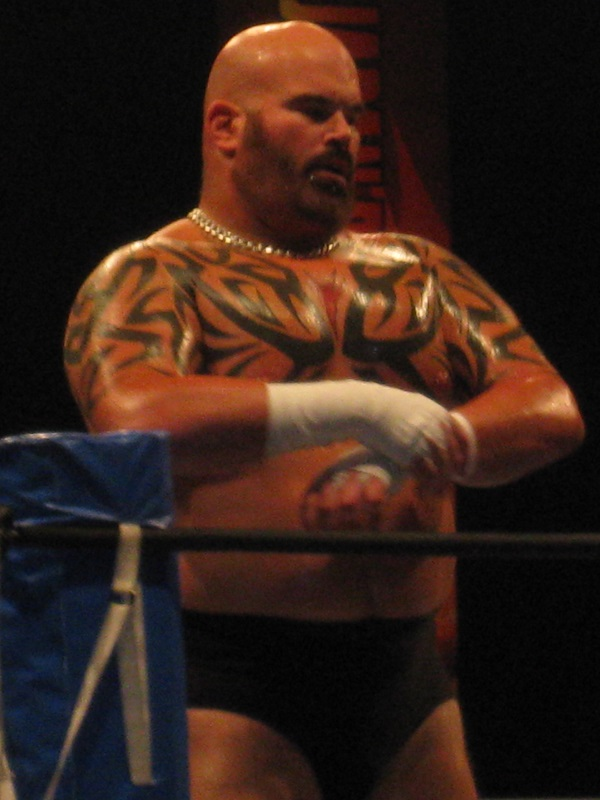
Giant Bernard

Giant Bernard and Karl Anderson first came together in New Japan Pro-Wrestling (NJPW), when Bernard, along with his Detonators tag team partner Rick Fuller turned on the RISE stable on September 5, 2008, and jumped to the villainous Great Bash Heel (GBH) stable by helping Togi Makabe and Toru Yano retain the IWGP Tag Team Championship against Hirooki Goto and Shinsuke Nakamura. Bernard teamed with new GBH stablemate Anderson for the first time on October 20, but the two did not become regular tag team partners until after the 2008 G1 Tag League, when Fuller left NJPW. Anderson and Bernard represented GBH until April 5, 2009, when the entire stable, with the exception of Tomoaki Honma, turned on Togi Makabe and joined Shinsuke Nakamura to form the new Chaos stable. As representatives of Chaos, Anderson and Bernard earned their first shot at the IWGP Tag Team Championship by defeating Tencozy (Hiroyoshi Tenzan and Satoshi Kojima) in a number one contender's match on May 3 at Wrestling Dontaku 2009. They received their title shot on June 20 at Dominion 6.20, but were defeated by the defending champions, Team 3D (Brother Devon and Brother Ray), representatives of American promotion Total Nonstop Action Wrestling (TNA). On October 17, Anderson and Bernard entered the 2009 G1 Tag League. After a clean record of four wins and zero losses, Anderson and Bernard advanced to the semifinals of the tournament, where, on November 1, they defeated Wild Child (Manabu Nakanishi and Takao Omori). Later that same day, Anderson and Bernard defeated Apollo 55 (Prince Devitt and Ryusuke Taguchi) in the finals to win the tournament, after which Bernard declared war on Team 3D. During the following day's press conference Anderson and Bernard reiterated their intention of defeating Team 3D for the IWGP Tag Team Championship, while also announcing their new tag team name, "Bad Intentions". The title rematch between Bad Intentions and Team 3D took place on November 8 at Destruction '09 and ended in a double count-out, meaning that Team 3D retained the title.

=== IWGP Tag Team Championship reign (2010–2012) ===
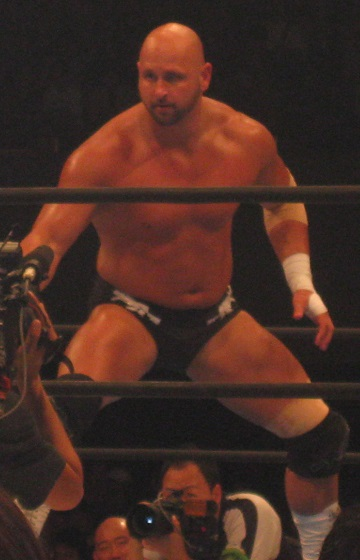
Karl Anderson

On January 4, 2010, at Wrestle Kingdom IV in Tokyo Dome, Bad Intentions took part in a hardcore three-way match for the IWGP Tag Team Championship, which also included defending champions Team 3D and No Limit (Tetsuya Naito and Yujiro Takahashi). The match ended with Takahashi pinning Anderson to capture the title for No Limit. On April 4, Chaos members Takashi Iizuka and Toru Yano turned on Anderson and gave his and Bernard's spots in the stable to No Limit. On May 3 at Wrestling Dontaku 2010, another three-way match for the IWGP Tag Team Championship took place, where Team 3D was replaced by Seigigun (Wataru Inoue and Yuji Nagata), who ended up winning the match and capturing the title from No Limit. Finally, on June 19 at Dominion 6.19, Bad Intentions defeated Seigigun and No Limit in a three-way elimination match to win the IWGP Tag Team Championship. The third and final three-way match between Bad Intentions, Seigigun and No Limit took place on July 19 and saw Bad Intentions emerge victorious, making their first successful defense of the IWGP Tag Team Championship. After another successful title defense against Seigigun on September 26, Bad Intentions got involved in a storyline rivalry with another TNA tag team, Beer Money, Inc. (James Storm and Robert Roode), losing to them in a non-title match on October 22. From October 24 to November 7, Bad Intentions took part in the 2010 G1 Tag League, where they reached the semifinals, before losing to eventual tournament winners, Wataru Inoue and Yuji Nagata of Seigigun. This led to another title match on December 11, where Bad Intentions defeated Seigigun for their third successful title defense. On January 4, 2011, at Wrestle Kingdom V in Tokyo Dome, Beer Money, Inc. returned to NJPW to challenge Bad Intentions for the IWGP Tag Team Championship in a three-way match, which also included Muscle Orchestra (Manabu Nakanishi and Strong Man). In the end, Bad Intentions was victorious, making their fourth successful title defense. Their fifth defense took place just eighteen days later, when they defeated the Consejo Mundial de Lucha Libre (CMLL) tag team of Atlantis and Okumura as part of the Fantastica Mania 2011 weekend. On February 16, Bad Intentions made their debut for Pro Wrestling Noah, defeating Akitoshi Saito and Takashi Sugiura in a tag team match. Four days later at The New Beginning, Bad Intentions defeated Muscle Orchestra back in NJPW for their sixth successful title defense. As part of the rivalry with Muscle Orchestra, Bad Intentions also started a storyline rivalry with Tokyo Sports, attacking one of the magazine's reporters, after it had named Muscle Orchestra the 2010 Tag Team of the Year, despite Anderson and Bernard's lengthy title reign. On May 3 at Wrestling Dontaku 2011, Bad Intentions made their seventh successful title defense against No Limit and, as a result, now shared the record for most successful defenses of the IWGP Tag Team Championship with Cho-Ten (Hiroyoshi Tenzan and Masahiro Chono).

On June 18 at Dominion 6.18, Bad Intentions defeated the Pro Wrestling Noah tag team of Takuma Sano and Yoshihiro Takayama to not only break the record for most successful defenses of the IWGP Tag Team Championship, but to also win the GHC Tag Team Championship. After their ninth successful IWGP Tag Team Championship defense against Hirooki Goto and IWGP Heavyweight Champion Hiroshi Tanahashi on July 3, Bad Intentions returned to Pro Wrestling Noah on July 23 to make their first successful defense of the GHC Tag Team Championship against Takeshi Morishima and Yutaka Yoshie. On September 9, the 447th day of their title reign, Anderson and Bernard became the longest reigning IWGP Tag Team Champions in history, breaking the previous record held by Cho-Ten. Their second defense of the GHC Tag Team Championship took place on October 31, when they defeated Go Shiozaki and Shuhei Taniguchi. On November 6, Bad Intentions made it to the finals of the 2011 G1 Tag League, before losing to Suzuki-gun (Lance Archer and Minoru Suzuki). This led to a rematch between the two teams on November 12 at Power Struggle, where Bad Intentions was victorious, making their tenth successful defense of the IWGP Tag Team Championship. On January 4, 2012, at Wrestle Kingdom VI in Tokyo Dome, Bad Intentions lost the IWGP Tag Team Championship to the recently reunited Tencozy, ending their reign at 564 days and ten successful title defenses. Eighteen days later, they also lost the GHC Tag Team Championship to the team of Akitoshi Saito and Jun Akiyama. Bad Intentions attempted to regain the IWGP Tag Team Championship from Tencozy on February 12, but were unsuccessful in what would turn out to be the team's final match together. The following month, Bernard left NJPW to return to WWE, disbanding Bad Intentions.

== Championships and accomplishments ==
- New Japan Pro-Wrestling
  - IWGP Tag Team Championship (1 time)
  - G1 Tag League (2009)
- Pro Wrestling Noah
  - GHC Tag Team Championship (1 time)
- Wrestling Observer Newsletter
  - Tag Team of the Year (2011)
