= Satoshi Kojima =

Japanese professional wrestler (born 1970)

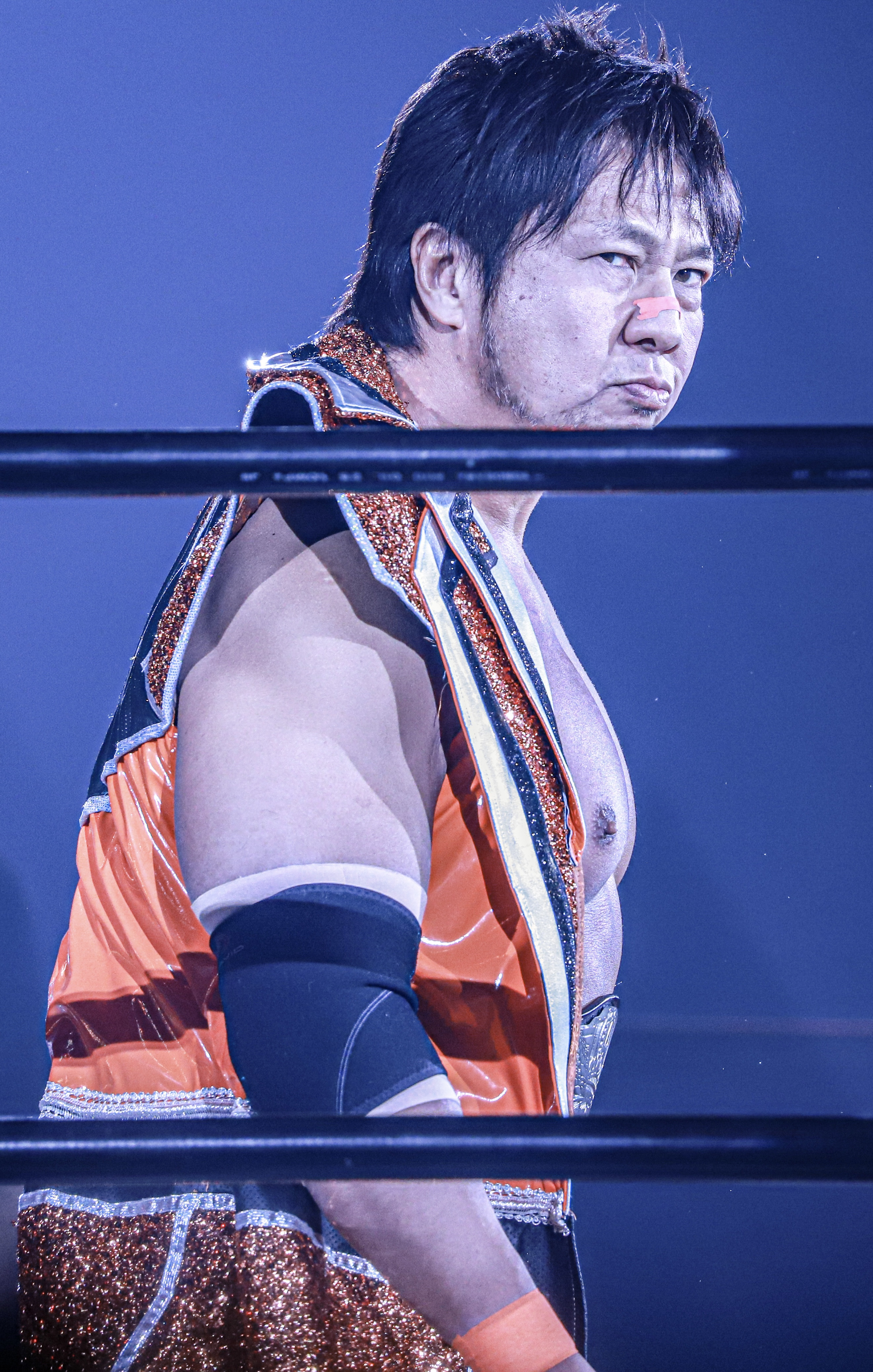
- Kojima in 2023

Personal information
- Born: September 14, 1970 (age 56) Kōtō, Tokyo, Japan

Professional wrestling career
- Ring name(s): The Great Koji; The Great Kosuke; Joe-Joe Lee; Kojima; Lion Satoshi; Satoshi Kojima
- Billed height: 183 cm (6 ft 0 in)
- Billed weight: 108 kg (238 lb)
- Trained by: Animal Hamaguchi; Joe Daigo; Stan Hansen; NJPW Dojo
- Debut: July 16, 1991

Satoshi Kojima (小島 聡, Kojima Satoshi; born September 14, 1970) is a Japanese professional wrestler. He is signed to New Japan Pro-Wrestling (NJPW).

Considered to be one of the greatest Japanese professional wrestlers of the 21st century and of all-time, he was the first wrestler to hold NJPW's IWGP Heavyweight Championship and All Japan Pro Wrestling (AJPW)'s Triple Crown Championship simultaneously, the fourth to win the three major heavyweight championships in Japan with the Triple Crown Heavyweight, IWGP Heavyweight, and Noah's GHC Heavyweight Championship, and one of three wrestlers to hold the IWGP Heavyweight Championship, Triple Crown Championship, and NWA Worlds Heavyweight Championship (the other two being Keiji Mutoh and Shinya Hashimoto), and is an overall eight-time world champion in major professional wrestling promotions.

As a team, he and Hiroyoshi Tenzan are six-time IWGP Tag Team Champions and became the first team to win G1 Tag League and World's Strongest Tag Determination League in the same year. He and Tenzan are also former NWA World Tag Team Champions. Between the NWA, AJPW, NJPW, and Noah, Kojima has held 20 total championships.

== Early life ==
Like many Japanese wrestlers, Kojima has a background in judo, but he chose not to continue the sport when he went to college. He got his start loading trucks for New Japan Pro-Wrestling (NJPW), and after some months of persuasion finally convinced head trainer Animal Hamaguchi to accept him into the dojo.

== Professional wrestling career ==
=== New Japan Pro-Wrestling (1991–2002) ===
Kojima entered the NJPW Dojo in February 1991. He debuted as a wrestler on July 16, 1991 in a match against future tag team partner Hiroyoshi Yamamoto (later to be known as Hiroyoshi Tenzan) where Yamamoto won. In 1994 he defeated Manabu Nakanishi in the Young Lions Cup finals, winning the tournament. In the end of that year he went to Europe, including a spell in Orig Williams' British Wrestling Federation as face-painted Suzuki Karimoto (including appearances on Williams 's Welsh language TV wrestling show on S4C, Reslo and for Brian Dixon's All Star Wrestling as heel Mean Machine, and returned to NJPW in January 1996. When he returned, he formed The Bull Powers with Nakanishi, who had returned from WCW. In May 1997 he defeated Riki Choshu and Kensuke Sasaki with Nakanishi to become an IWGP Tag Team Champion for the first time. At the end of 1998 he joined nWo Japan, by Keiji Mutoh's leadership. Kojima and Tenzan (known together as Tencozy, a portmanteau of their last names) formed a tag team and ended up holding the IWGP Tag Team title together twice.

=== Major League Wrestling (2002–2003) ===
On September 26, 2002, Kojima defeated Jerry Lynn to win the vacant MLW World Heavyweight Championship in New York. Kojima successfully defended the title five times in both MLW and All Japan Pro Wrestling. Kojima held the championship for a then record 267 days, before losing the title to Mike Awesome on June 20, 2003.

=== All Japan Pro Wrestling (2002–2010) ===
In January 2002, in opposition to Antonio Inoki focusing the IWGP title on unreliable shoot style wrestlers such as Kazuyuki Fujita and Tadao Yasuda, as well as Inoki debuting his controversial "Inokiism" era where NJPW relied heavily on MMA shoot match crossovers, Kojima left NJPW with his mentor Keiji Mutoh, and joined All Japan Pro Wrestling where he was finally able to receive the push of a top star. One of Kojima's early feuds in AJPW was against "Dr. Death" Steve Williams and Mike Barton (Bart Gunn), who as AJPW loyalists didn't take kindly to Kojima's and Muto's "invasion" of the company. Kojima also fought against Genichiro Tenryu at this time, who would also become an AJPW loyalist.

In promos throughout 2002, Steve Williams often mentioned Satoshi Kojima as someone he would like to beat. Kojima and Williams would cross paths multiple times in tag-team matches, where on the March 23, 2002 edition of AJPW TV, Williams surprise attacked and suplexed Kojima when Kojima was cutting a promo on Tenryu. Kojima later turned babyface by December 2002, where on the December 6, 2002 pay-per-view Kojima and Taiyo Kea won the Real World Tag League of that year. Williams would watch the celebration somewhat jealously while reluctantly shaking Kojima's hand, looking down at the title on his shoulder. On the January 2, 2003 edition of AJPW TV Williams aggressively slapped Kojima in the corner of the ring during the New Year's Battle Royal before being eliminated, which Kojima went on to win. In January 2003, Williams and his partner Mike Rotunda defeated Kojima and his team three times in tag-team house show matches, but Williams ultimately left AJPW after its sale finalized. As a result a singles match between Williams and Kojima heading into 2003 never materialized.

Kojima would later hold both of the company's tag team titles, the World Tag Team Championship twice. On February 16, 2005, he won the Triple Crown Heavyweight Championship, AJPW's unified heavyweight championship from Toshiaki Kawada. Only four days later he won NJPW's heavyweight championship, the IWGP Heavyweight Championship, from his former tag team partner Hiroyoshi Tenzan in a cross-promotional double title match. The match had a unique finish designed to fool fans in attendance. The idea was to make it look like the match was going to end in a 60-minute time limit draw. However, with just seconds before the match would be declared a time limit draw, Tenzan, who was known to have a legitimate back injury, could not continue, resulting in Kojima being declared the winner and becoming the new IWGP Heavyweight Champion. NJPW officials had come up with the finish, which was designed to look like a "mistake", having agreed with AJPW that it would be better if Kojima won the match, but not wanting the match to end in a standard pinfall or submission. On May 14, 2005, Tenzan won the IWGP title back, but not the Triple Crown.

Upon joining AJPW, Kojima began to use the Great Koji (copying The Great Muta) and Great Kosuke (copying The Great Sasuke) personas for special matches.

On July 3, 2006, Kojima lost the Triple Crown to Taiyō Kea. Three days later it was revealed that Kojima would return to New Japan to compete in the 2006 G1 Climax, where he would go to lose in the finals against former tag team partner and rival Hiroyoshi Tenzan.

In October 2006 it was announced that Tencozy would reform for the upcoming World's Strongest Tag Determination League tournament. On December 2, 2006, the reformed Tencozy won the World's Strongest Tag Determination League defeating Kohei Suwama and RO'Z in the finals when Kojima used a lariat on RO'Z. The duo next faced Masahiro Chono and Keiji Mutoh at NJPW's Wrestle Kingdom in Tokyo Dome. They lost when Chono forced Tenzan to submit.

In July 2007, Kojima shocked the All-Japan Army when he betrayed them and joined the Voodoo Murders, where he was quickly made the group's co-leader along with TARU. Soon after joining, Kojima and TARU won the World Tag Team Championship from Toshiaki Kawada and Taiyō Kea. Kojima left the group in 2008 after returning from injury to side with his sworn friend Hiroyoshi Tenzan and to feud with the alliance of Great Bash Heel (Tenzan's former group) and the VooDoo Murders.

In 2008, Tenzan and Kojima became the first tag team to ever win G1 Tag League and World's Strongest Tag Determination League in the same year. Later he started his 1st stable named F4 (Friend Fight Fan and Future) with young proteges YAMATO and KAI. A 4th member in Zodiac joined later in 2009. On September 26, 2009, a few days after his 39th birthday Kojima lifted the All-Japan Triple Crown off of Yoshihiro Takayama, returning the titles to All-Japan and winning them for the 2nd time. He lost the title on March 21, 2010, to Ryota Hama.

Kojima's AJPW page was taken down soon before he agreed to compete in New Japan Pro-Wrestling's 20th annual G1 Climax. It is reported that he was plagued with an arm injury that required surgery and needed time off to heal. AJPW then refused to discuss re-signing Kojima until he was healthy. It has been reported Kojima was not pleased with this and began entertaining other possibilities.

=== Return to NJPW (2010–present) ===
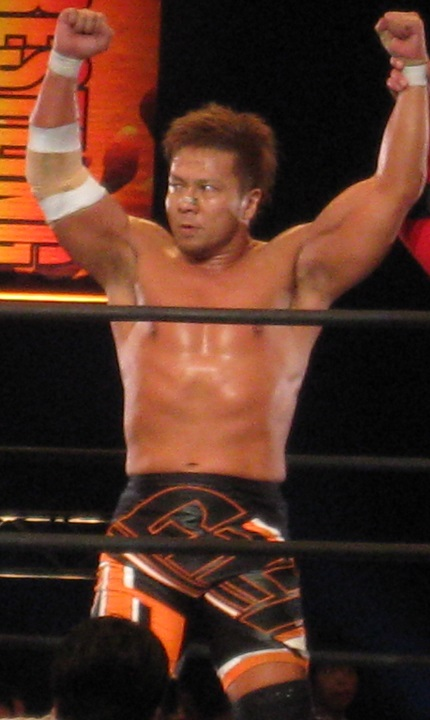
Kojima in August 2011

Kojima returned to New Japan in August 2010 to take part in the 2010 G1 Climax tournament. His return match took place on August 6, 2010, when he teamed up with El Samurai in a tag team match, where they were defeated by Hirooki Goto and Ryusuke Taguchi. In the round robin stage of the tournament Kojima won five out his seven matches and won his block to advance to the finals, where, on August 15, he defeated Hiroshi Tanahashi to win G1 Climax. On October 11 Kojima defeated Togi Makabe to win the IWGP Heavyweight Championship for the second time. On December 11 Kojima made his first successful defense of the title, defeating Shinsuke Nakamura. On December 14 Kojima announced that he was starting his own stable, tentatively named Kojima Office, and named Taichi, who had accompanied him to the ring for his Nakamura match, its first member. Kojima turned heel on December 23, when he hit his number one contender Hiroshi Tanahashi with a lariat after a match, where he and Kota Ibushi had defeated Tanahashi and Prince Devitt. On January 4, 2011, at Wrestle Kingdom V in Tokyo Dome, Kojima lost the IWGP Heavyweight Championship to Tanahashi. On January 30 Kojima defeated Togi Makabe to earn a rematch with Tanahashi. Meanwhile, the newly renamed Kojima-gun expanded to include Taka Michinoku and Nosawa Rongai, who in turn used his connections to get MVP to also join the group. Kojima received his rematch for the IWGP Heavyweight Championship on February 20 at The New Beginning, but was again defeated by Tanahashi. After Kojima was defeated by Togi Makabe on May 3, Taichi and Taka Michinoku turned on him and named the returning Minoru Suzuki as their new leader, while Kojima himself formed a new partnership with Makabe and MVP, who left the stable after Suzuki took over. On July 18, Suzuki defeated Kojima in a singles match. The two had a rematch on August 1 during the first day of the 2011 G1 Climax, where Kojima managed to pick up the win. Kojima managed to win five more matches in the tournament, but a loss to former partner Hiroyoshi Tenzan on the final day eliminated him from the running for a spot in the finals. After the tournament Kojima was sidelined indefinitely with an eye injury suffered during the match with Tenzan.

On September 19, it was announced that Kojima had signed a contract with New Japan to become an official member of the promotion's roster. Kojima then announced that he would make his return on October 10 at Destruction '11 and challenged former partner Hiroyoshi Tenzan to be his opponent that day. Kojima would end up defeating Tenzan in his return match. In the 2011 G1 Tag League, Kojima teamed with Togi Makabe as the "Beast Combination". After picking up three wins and one loss in their first four matches, Kojima and Makabe were defeated by the Billion Powers (Hirooki Goto and Hiroshi Tanahashi) on November 4, causing them to narrowly miss advancing to the semi-finals of the tournament. Kojima and Tenzan faced each other yet again on November 12 in a match, which was won by Tenzan. Afterwards, the former tag team partners came together to fend off an attack from CHAOS. Tencozy wrestled their return match as a tag team on December 4, defeating CHAOS members Hideo Saito and Takashi Iizuka. On January 4, 2012, at Wrestle Kingdom VI in Tokyo Dome, Kojima and Tenzan defeated Bad Intentions (Giant Bernard and Karl Anderson) to win the IWGP Tag Team Championship for the third time. On May 3 at Wrestling Dontaku 2012, Kojima and Tenzan lost the title to Takashi Iizuka and Toru Yano in their third defense. On July 22, Kojima and Tenzan defeated Iizuka and Yano in a decision match to regain the newly vacated title. On October 8 at King of Pro-Wrestling, Kojima and Tenzan lost the title to K.E.S. (Davey Boy Smith, Jr. and Lance Archer). From November 20 to December 1, Tencozy took part in the round-robin portion of the 2012 World Tag League. The team finished with a record of four wins and two losses, winning their block and advancing to the semi-finals of the tournament. On December 2, Tencozy was eliminated from the tournament in their semi-final match by Sword & Guns (Hirooki Goto and Karl Anderson). On December 9, Kojima made a rare appearance for Pro Wrestling Noah, unsuccessfully challenging Takeshi Morishima for the GHC Heavyweight Championship. On April 7, 2013, Kojima unsuccessfully challenged visiting Rob Conway for the NWA World Heavyweight Championship at New Japan's Invasion Attack event. On May 3, Tencozy regained the IWGP Tag Team Championship from K.E.S. in a four-way match, which also included Takashi Iizuka and Toru Yano, and Manabu Nakanishi and Strong Man, starting Kojima's sixth reign as champion. From August 1 to 11, Kojima took part in the 2013 G1 Climax. where he finished second to last in his block with a record of four wins and five losses. However, a victory over reigning IWGP Heavyweight Champion Kazuchika Okada on the final day of the tournament earned Kojima a shot at the title. The title match between the two took place on September 29 at Destruction and saw Okada retain his title. Following the match, Kojima was sidelined with a dislocated shoulder and was expected to miss two months of in-ring action. Kojima returned to the ring on November 9 at Power Struggle, where he and Tenzan lost the IWGP Tag Team Championship back to K.E.S. in a three-way match, which also included The IronGodz (Jax Dane and Rob Conway). In December, Tencozy made it to the finals of the 2013 World Tag League, defeating K.E.S. in the semi-finals, before losing to Doc Gallows and Karl Anderson.

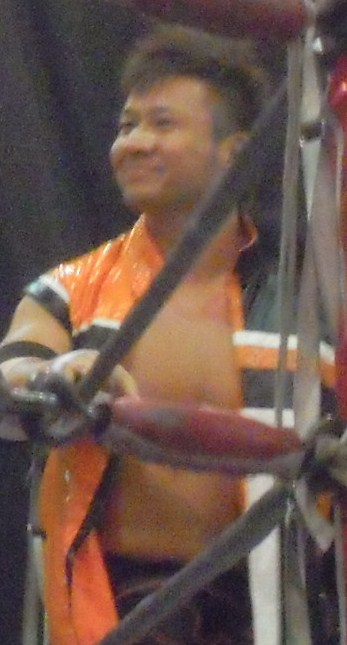
Kojima in November 2011

During the tournament, Kojima pinned Rob Conway, which led to him challenging him to a rematch for the NWA World Heavyweight Championship. On January 4, 2014, at Wrestle Kingdom 8 in Tokyo Dome, Kojima defeated Conway to become the new NWA World Heavyweight Champion. The following day, Tencozy unsuccessfully challenged The IronGodz for the NWA World Tag Team Championship with Conway pinning Kojima following a low blow. On February 9 at The New Beginning in Hiroshima, Kojima made his first successful defense of the NWA World Heavyweight Championship against Big Daddy Yum-Yum. Two days later at The New Beginning in Osaka, Tencozy defeated Yum-Yum and Michael Tarver to earn another shot at the NWA World Tag Team Championship. On April 6 at Invasion Attack 2014, Tencozy defeated The IronGodz to win the NWA World Tag Team Championship. Six days later, during New Japan's trip to Taiwan, Kojima made his second successful defense of the NWA World Heavyweight Championship against Rob Conway. The following day, Tencozy also successfully defended the NWA World Tag Team Championship against The IronGodz. On May 3 at Wrestling Dontaku 2014, Kojima defeated Wes Brisco for his third successful defense of the NWA World Heavyweight Championship. On May 25 at Back to the Yokohama Arena, Tencozy successfully defended the NWA World Tag Team Championship against Brisco and Conway and K.E.S. in a three-way match. The following week, Kojima returned to the United States to defend the NWA World Heavyweight Championship. After successful defenses against Jeremiah Plunkett, Damien Wayne and Houston Carson, Kojima lost the title back to Rob Conway on June 2 in Las Vegas. Upon his return to Japan, Kojima and Tenzan successfully defended the NWA World Tag Team Championship against K.E.S. on June 21 at Dominion 6.21. After four successful title defenses, they lost the title to K.E.S. in a rematch on October 13 at King of Pro-Wrestling. The following month, Tencozy took part in the 2014 World Tag League, where they finished with a record of four wins and three losses, failing to advance to the finals. In late 2014, Kojima began making appearances for Pro Wrestling Noah, which culminated in him unsuccessfully challenging Naomichi Marufuji for the GHC Heavyweight Championship on January 10, 2015. On March 21, Kojima unsuccessfully challenged Hiroyoshi Tenzan for the NWA World Heavyweight Championship. From July 23 to August 15, Kojima took part in the 2015 G1 Climax, where he finished with a record of three wins and six losses. On March 19, 2016, Kojima unsuccessfully challenged Katsuyori Shibata for the NEVER Openweight Championship.

On July 3, Kojima teamed up with Matt Sydal and Ricochet to defeat The Elite (Kenny Omega and The Young Bucks (Matt Jackson and Nick Jackson)) for the NEVER Openweight 6-Man Tag Team Championship. Afterwards, Kojima backed out of the 2016 G1 Climax and gave his spot to Hiroyoshi Tenzan to give his longtime tag team partner one final chance to win the tournament. On August 14, Kojima unsuccessfully challenged Jay Lethal for the Ring of Honor (ROH) World Championship. On September 25, Kojima, Ricochet and Sydal were stripped of the NEVER Openweight 6-Man Tag Team Championship due to Sydal failing to make a scheduled title defense at Destruction in Kobe because of travel issues. That same day, Kojima and Ricochet, now teaming with David Finlay, defeated Adam Cole and The Young Bucks to regain the vacant title. They lost the title to Los Ingobernables de Japón (Bushi, Evil and Sanada) in a four-team gauntlet match at Wrestle Kingdom 11 in Tokyo Dome on January 4, 2017. On March 6, Tencozy defeated Tomohiro Ishii and Toru Yano to win the IWGP Tag Team Championship for the sixth time. They lost the title to War Machine (Hanson and Raymond Rowe) on April 9 at Sakura Genesis 2017.

On August 27, 2017, Kojima made a one-night return to AJPW, wrestling his first match for the company in five years. He defeated Suwama in the match, but was left with a bad aftertaste due to the win coming as a result of a pre-match attack on Suwama by Joe Doering.

After sitting most of 2018 out with an ACL injury, Kojima returned and teamed with Tenzan in the 2018 World Tag League, earning 10 points. Kojima would then enter the 2019 New Japan Cup where he was eliminated in the first round by long time rival Minoru Suzuki. Kojima and Tenzan entered the 2019 World Tag League and finished with 6 points, not making the finals. Kojima would enter the 2020 New Japan Cup, however was eliminated in the first round by eventual winner EVIL. In December 2020, after Juice Robinson sustained an eye injury, Kojima would replace him and challenge KENTA for his IWGP United States Heavyweight Championship Right to Challenge briefcase at Wrestle Kingdom 15. At the event, Kojima lost. Kojima then began a feud with Will Ospreay culminating in a No Disqualification Match at The New Beginning in Nagoya, where Ospreay would defeat Kojima. Kojima entered the 2021 New Japan Cup, but was eliminated in the first round by Jeff Cobb.

=== Consejo Mundial de Lucha Libre (2017, 2024) ===
On June 28, 2017, Mexican promotion Consejo Mundial de Lucha Libre (CMLL) announced that Kojima would be making his debut for the promotion in the 2017 International Gran Prix. He was eliminated from the torneo cibernetico on September 1 by Último Guerrero. Kojima also took part in an event held by the Lucha Memes promotion on September 3, losing to Hechicero.

On May 24, 2024 he returned to the CMLL as part of the CozyMAX (Okumura) tag team, they lost against Los Depredadores (Magia Blanca & Rugido). On May 28, 2024 they made their first defense of the MLW World Tag Team Championship against Los Depredadores (Magia Blanca & Rugido).

=== Impact Wrestling (2021) ===
On the May 20, 2021, episode of Impact!, a video package aired promoting Kojima arriving to Impact Wrestling as part of a partnership between Impact and NJPW. On the following week's Impact!, Kojima made his debut confronting Violent by Design where he challenged VBD member Joe Doering to a match at Against All Odds. At the event, Kojima lost to Doering. On the June 24 episode of Impact!, he teamed up with Eddie Edwards to face VBD members Doering and Deaner for the Impact World Tag Team Championship, but failed to win. The following week on Impact!, he teamed up with Jake Something to defeat Brian Myers and Sam Beale, in what would be his final match in the company.

=== All Elite Wrestling (2021, 2023) ===
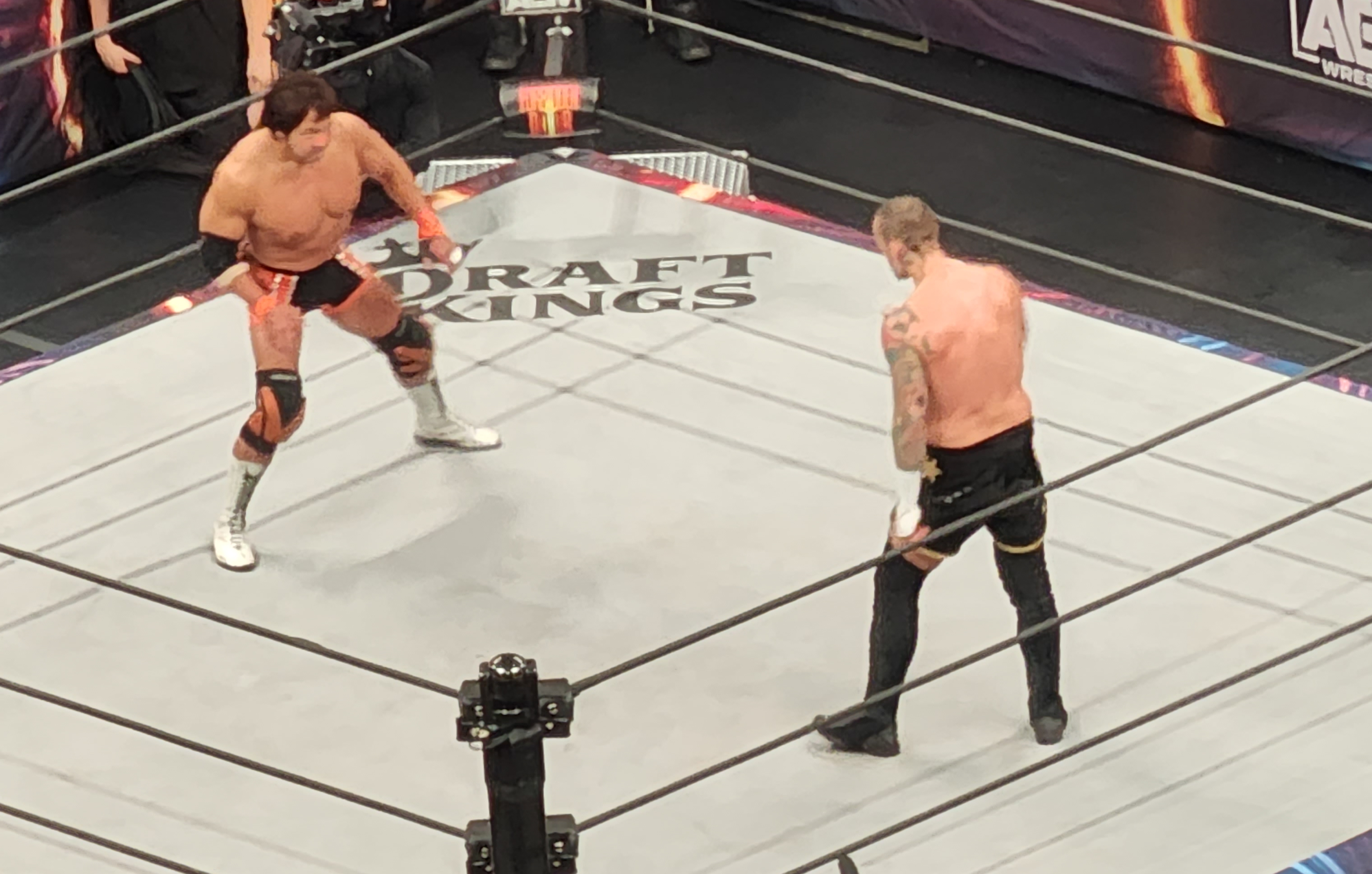
Kojima (left) facing off with CM Punk (right) at AEW x NJPW: Forbidden Door in June 2023

On the August 25, 2021, episode of Dynamite, Jon Moxley announced a match against Kojima at All Out. At the event on September 5, he lost to Moxley. On June 25, 2023 at Forbidden Door, Kojima competed in the Owen Hart Foundation Men's Tournament, losing to CM Punk in the quarterfinals of the tournament. On October 1 at WrestleDream Zero Hour, Kojima teamed with Athena, Billie Starkz, and Keith Lee to defeat Shane Taylor Promotions (Lee Moriarty and Shane Taylor), Diamanté, and Mercedes Martinez.

=== Pro Wrestling Noah (2022–2023) ===
On April 30 at Majestic 2022, Kojima was revealed to be Naomichi Marufuji's mystery partner against Kinya Okada and Yoshiki Inamura which Kojima and Marufuji won. Kojima then challenged Go Shiozaki for the GHC Heavyweight Championship after Shiozaki won the vacant title after defeating Kaito Kiyomiya in the main event. At CyberFight Festival 2022, Kojima defeated Shiozaki to win the GHC Heavyweight Championship for the first time and became the fourth Japanese wrestler to win all the major Heavyweight titles in Japan, having also won the IWGP Heavyweight and Triple Crown Heavyweight Championships in his career.

=== Return to MLW (2024–present) ===
In January 2024, Kojima returned to MLW to challenge World Heavyweight Champion, Alex Kane to a title match. At SuperFight 2024, Kojima defeated Kane to win the MLW World Heavyweight Championship, 22 years after first winning the title. Kojima also became the first 2-time World Heavyweight Champion in the promotions history. At Intimidation Games, Kojima successfully defended his title against Minoru Suzuki. At War Chamber, Kojima team up with The Second Gear Crew (Matthew Justice and 1 Called Manders) and Shigeo Okumura, as Team MLW. Together, they defeated World Titan Federation (Tom Lawlor, Davey Boy Smith Jr., Richard Holliday, and Josh Bishop) in a War Chamber match. At War Chamber II, Kojima successfully defended his title against Bad Dude Tito. At Aztecha Lucha, Kojima teamed up with Shigeo Okumura, calling their team, CozyMax. Together, they defeated The Second Gear Crew (Matthew Justice and 1 Called Manders) to win the vacant MLW World Tag Team Championship. Kojima also became a double champion in the process, the first to hold both the World Heavyweight and World Tag Team titles at the same time. He lost the title to Matt Riddle at Kings of Colisseum 2025.

== Other media ==
Kojima, along with fellow NJPW wrestlers Hiroshi Tanahashi, Hiroyoshi Tenzan, Kazuchika Okada, Tetsuya Naito and Toru Yano, appears as a member of the gang Justis in the 2016 video game Yakuza 6: The Song of Life. He also appears in the game Fire Pro Wrestling World as a playable character.

== Personal life ==
Kojima has a daughter.

== Championships and accomplishments ==
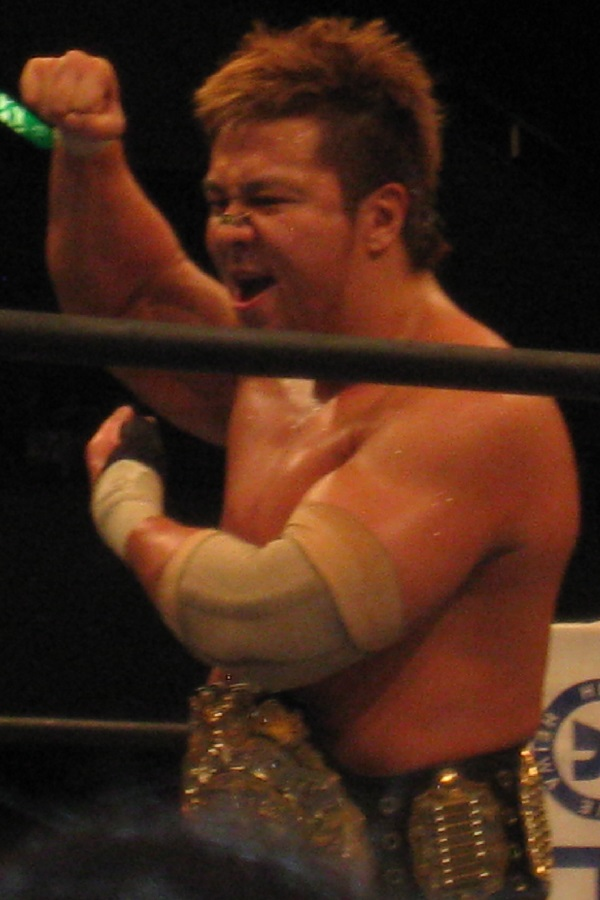
Kojima is a two-time IWGP Heavyweight Champion...

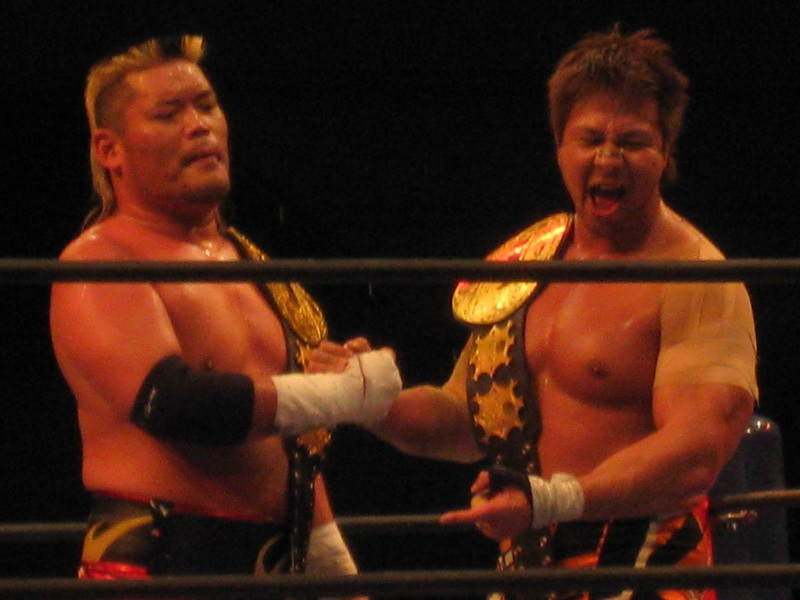
...a seven-time IWGP Tag Team Champions – including six reigns with Hiroyoshi Tenzan (left)...

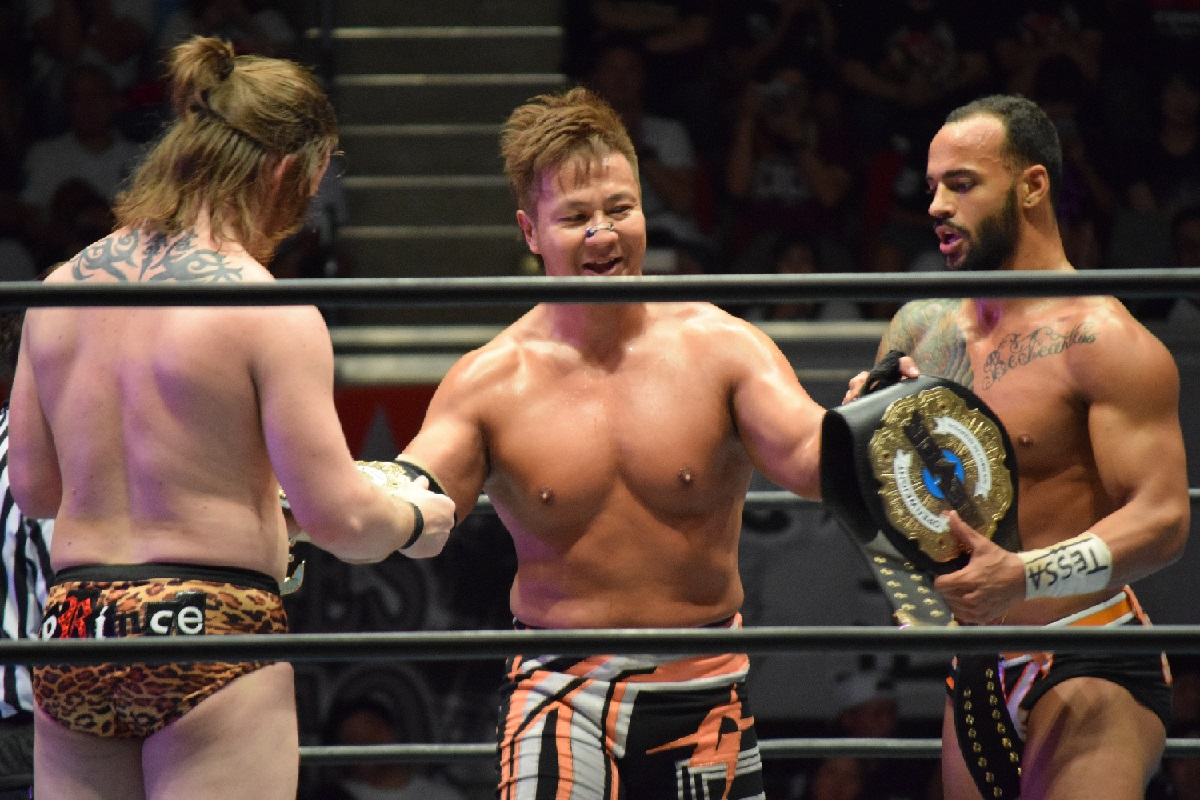
...and a two-time NEVER Openweight 6-Man Tag Team Champion – shown here with David Finlay (left) and Ricochet (right).

- All Japan Pro Wrestling
  - Triple Crown Heavyweight Championship (2 times)
  - All Asia Tag Team Championship (1 time) – with Shiryu
  - World Tag Team Championship (3 times) – with Taiyō Kea (1), Kaz Hayashi (1), and TARU (1)
  - BAPE STA!! Tag Tournament (2003) – with Apeman
  - Champion Carnival (2003)
  - Ōdō Tournament (2023)
  - January 2 Korakuen Hall Heavyweight Battle Royal (2003)
  - World's Strongest Tag Determination League – with Taiyō Kea (2002), Kaz Hayashi (2003), and Hiroyoshi Tenzan (2006, 2008)
- Major League Wrestling
  - MLW World Heavyweight Championship (2 times)
  - MLW World Tag Team Championship (2 times) – with Shigeo Okumura
- National Wrestling Alliance
  - NWA World Heavyweight Championship (1 time)
  - NWA World Tag Team Championship (1 time) – with Hiroyoshi Tenzan
- New Japan Pro-Wrestling
  - IWGP Heavyweight Championship (2 times)
  - IWGP Tag Team Championship (7 times) – with Hiroyoshi Tenzan (6) and Manabu Nakanishi (1)
  - NEVER Openweight 6-Man Tag Team Championship (2 times) – with Matt Sydal and Ricochet (1), and David Finlay and Ricochet (1)
  - Super Grade Tag League/G1 Tag League – with Keiji Mutoh (1998), and Hiroyoshi Tenzan (2001, 2008)
  - G1 Climax (2010)
  - Young Lion Cup (1994)
  - Fighting Spirit Award (2001)
  - Tag Team Best Bout (2000) with Hiroyoshi Tenzan vs. Manabu Nakanishi and Yuji Nagata on October 9
- Nikkan Sports
  - Best Tag Team Award (2008) with Hiroyoshi Tenzan
- Pro Wrestling Illustrated
  - Ranked No. 3 of the top 500 singles wrestlers in the PWI 500 in 2005
  - Ranked No. 275 of the top 500 singles wrestlers in the PWI Years in 2003
- Pro Wrestling Noah
  - GHC Heavyweight Championship (1 time)
  - GHC Tag Team Championship (1 time) – with Takashi Sugiura
- Pro Wrestling Zero1-Max
  - Fire Festival (2003)
- Tokyo Sports
  - Best Tag Team Award (2000) with Hiroyoshi Tenzan
  - Fighting Spirit Award (2010)
  - MVP Award (2005)
- Wrestling Observer Newsletter
  - Tag Team of the Year (2001) with Hiroyoshi Tenzan
