= Wrestle Kingdom V =

2011 PPV event in Tokyo, Japan

- Promotional poster for the event, featuring various NJPW wrestler
- Promotion: New Japan Pro-Wrestling
- Date: January 4, 2011
- City: Tokyo, Japan
- Venue: Tokyo Dome
- Attendance: 42,000 (official); 18,000 (claimed)

Pay-per-view chronology
| ← Previous; Circuit New Japan Alive | Next → The New Beginning |

Wrestle Kingdom chronology
| ← Previous; IV | Next → VI |

New Japan Pro-Wrestling events chronology
| ← Previous; Destruction '10 | Next → The New Beginning |

Wrestle Kingdom V in Tokyo Dome (レッスルキングダムV ｉｎ 東京ドーム, Ressuru Kingudamu V in Tōkyō Dōmu) was a professional wrestling pay-per-view (PPV) event produced by the New Japan Pro-Wrestling (NJPW) promotion, which took place at the Tokyo Dome in Tokyo, Japan on January 4, 2011. It was the 20th January 4 Tokyo Dome Show and the fifth held under the "Wrestle Kingdom" name. The event featured thirteen matches (including two dark matches), four of which were contested for championships.

The show included wrestlers from the American Total Nonstop Action Wrestling (TNA) and Mexican Consejo Mundial de Lucha Libre (CMLL) promotions for the fourth and third year in a row, respectively. During the show, the TNA World Heavyweight Championship was defended for the first time in Japan. The three matches involving TNA wrestlers were aired by the American company as part of the Global Impact 3 pay-per-view which aired on February 24, 2011 with English-language commentary from Don West and Mike Tenay. Wrestlers from DDT Pro-Wrestling, Pro Wrestling Noah and Pro Wrestling Zero1 also took part in the show.

While NJPW announced an attendance number of 42,000, which would have been the largest audience at a January 4 Tokyo Dome Show in six years, Dave Meltzer claimed that the actual attendance number was 18,000, tied with the 2007 Tokyo Dome show for the smallest audience in the event's history.

== Storylines ==
Wrestle Kingdom V featured thirteen professional wrestling matches that involved different wrestlers from pre-existing scripted feuds and storylines. Wrestlers portrayed villains, heroes, or less distinguishable characters in the scripted events that built tension and culminated in a wrestling match or series of matches.

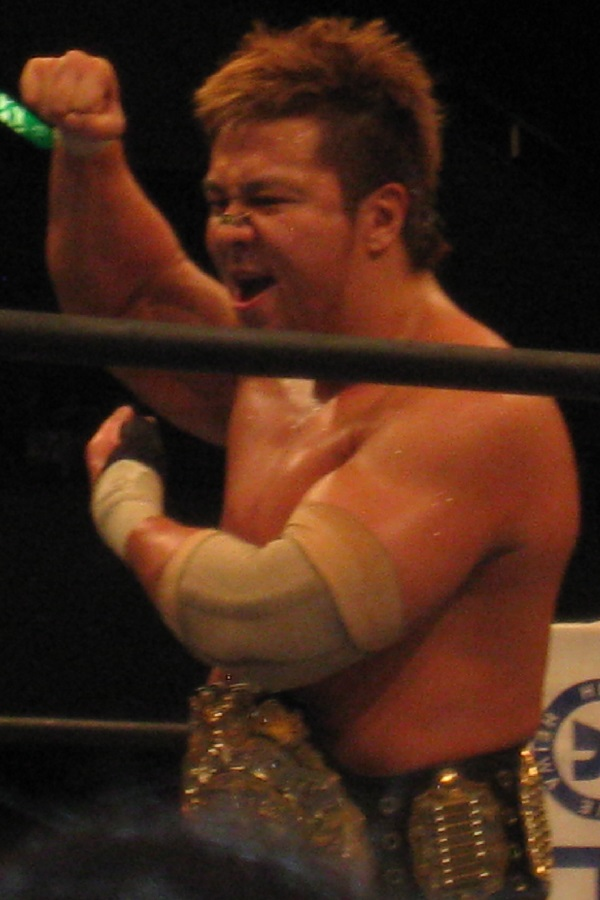
Satoshi Kojima, who headed into Wrestle Kingdom V as the defending IWGP Heavyweight Champion

Wrestle Kingdom V was headlined by Satoshi Kojima defending the IWGP Heavyweight Championship against Hiroshi Tanahashi in what was described as a "typical" NJPW storyline, where the company had put their top title on an outsider, leading to their biggest star getting it back at the Tokyo Dome. Kojima had started his career in NJPW, but jumped to All Japan Pro Wrestling (AJPW) in 2002 and was now working as a freelancer.

== Event ==
Other on-screen personnel
| Role: | Name: |
|---|---|
| Commentators | Shinji Yoshino |
| Commentators | Shinpei Nogami |
| Ring announcers | Kimihiko Ozaki |
| Referees | Kenta Sato |
| Referees | Marty Asami |
| Referees | Red Shoes Unno |
| Referees | Tiger Hattori |

In the main event of the show, Hiroshi Tanahashi defeated Satoshi Kojima to win the IWGP Heavyweight Championship, bringing the title back to NJPW. The semi-main event was a grudge match, where Togi Makabe defeated Masato Tanaka.

The event featured several wrestlers from the American Total Nonstop Action Wrestling (TNA) promotion as part of a relationship between NJPW and TNA. In the highest-profile of the matches involving TNA, Jeff Hardy successfully defended the TNA World Heavyweight Championship against NJPW's Tetsuya Naito, who had previously worked for TNA as part of the No Limit tag team. In another interpromotional match, TNA's Rob Van Dam defeated NJPW's Toru Yano in a hardcore match. In the first match involving TNA wrestlers, Beer Money, Inc. (James Storm and Robert Roode) unsuccessfully challenged Bad Intentions (Giant Bernard and Karl Anderson) for the IWGP Tag Team Championship in a three-way match, also involving Muscle Orchestra (Manabu Nakanishi and Strong Man).

In addition, the event included two interpromotional matches between NJPW and Pro Wrestling Noah. In the first, Noah's Takashi Sugiura and Yoshihiro Takayama defeated Hirooki Goto and Kazuchika Okada. This match was a one night NJPW return for Okada, who afterwards returned to TNA to continue his overseas learning excursion. In the second match, NJPW's Shinsuke Nakamura defeated Noah's Go Shiozaki.

The IWGP Junior Heavyweight Championship was also defended during the event with Prince Devitt defeating Kota Ibushi for his fourth successful defense.

== Results ==
| No. | Results | Stipulations | Times |
|---|---|---|---|
| 1^{D} | Tama Tonga, Tiger Mask, Tomoaki Honma and Wataru Inoue defeated Chaos (Gedo, Jado, Tomohiro Ishii and Yujiro Takahashi) | Eight-man tag team match | 07:33 |
| 2^{D} | Koji Kanemoto and Ryusuke Taguchi defeated Kenny Omega and Taichi | Tag team match | 08:04 |
| 3 | Bad Intentions (Giant Bernard and Karl Anderson) (c) defeated Beer Money, Inc. (James Storm and Robert Roode) and Muscle Orchestra (Manabu Nakanishi and Strong Man) | Three way tag team match for the IWGP Tag Team Championship | 08:36 |
| 4 | Máscara Dorada and La Sombra defeated Héctor Garza and Jyushin Thunder Liger | Tag team match | 07:42 |
| 5 | Hiroyoshi Tenzan defeated Takashi Iizuka | Deep Sleep to Lose match; the match could only be won by choking the opponent unconscious | 11:13 |
| 6 | Rob Van Dam defeated Toru Yano | Hardcore match | 11:28 |
| 7 | Yuji Nagata defeated Minoru Suzuki | Singles match | 16:15 |
| 8 | Prince Devitt (c) defeated Kota Ibushi (with Kenny Omega) | Singles match for the IWGP Junior Heavyweight Championship | 16:22 |
| 9 | Takashi Sugiura and Yoshihiro Takayama defeated Hirooki Goto and Kazuchika Okada | Tag team match | 12:08 |
| 10 | Jeff Hardy (c) defeated Tetsuya Naito | Singles match for the TNA World Heavyweight Championship | 11:04 |
| 11 | Shinsuke Nakamura defeated Go Shiozaki | Singles match | 14:17 |
| 12 | Togi Makabe defeated Masato Tanaka | Singles match | 12:46 |
| 13 | Hiroshi Tanahashi defeated Satoshi Kojima (c) | Singles match for the IWGP Heavyweight Championship | 21:57 |
(c) / – the champion(s) heading into the match; D / – this was a dark match

== See also ==
- TNA Global Impact!
