= Tokyo Sports =

Japanese entertainment newspaper

- Type: Daily newspaper
- Format: Blanket (54.6 cm x 40.65 cm)
- Owner: Tokyo Sports Newspaper Company
- President: Osamu Sakai
- Editor-in-chief: Osamu Sakai
- Language: Japanese
- Headquarters: Tokyo, Japan
- City: Tokyo
- Country: Japan
- Sister newspapers: Osaka Sports; Chukyo Sports; Kyushu Sports
- Website: Tokyo Sports

Tokyo Sports (東京スポーツ, Tōkyō Supōtsu) is a Japanese daily sports newspaper founded in 1960.

== See also ==
- Tokyo Sports Film Award
- Tokyo Sports Puroresu Awards
