= Wataru Inoue =

Japanese retired professional wrestler (born 1973)

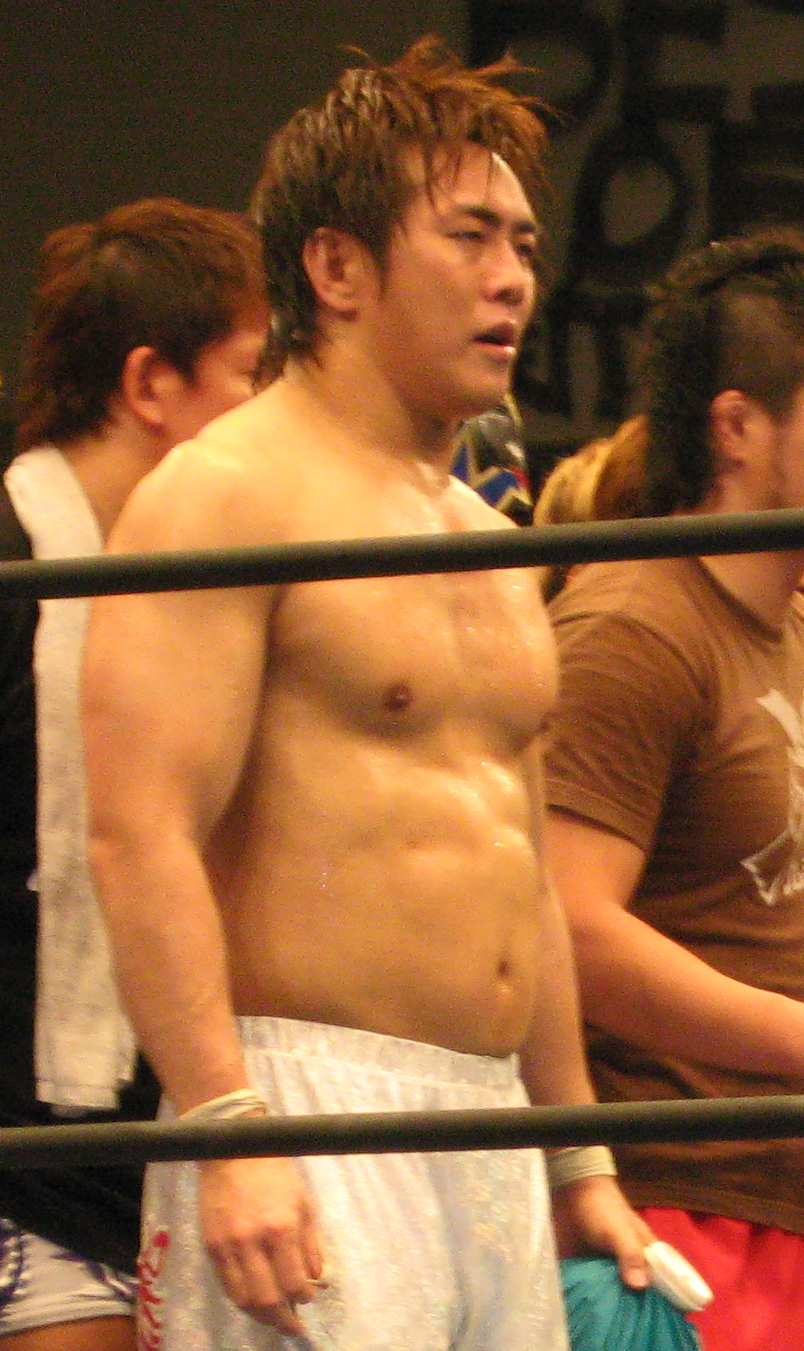
- Inoue in 2007

Personal information
- Born: July 27, 1973 (age 52) Tokyo, Japan

Professional wrestling career
- Ring name(s): Wataru Inoue; El Puma Inoue
- Billed height: 1.80 m (5 ft 11 in)
- Billed weight: 94 kg (207 lb)
- Billed from: Tokyo, Japan
- Trained by: Animal Hamaguchi; NJPW Dojo
- Debut: October 10, 1999
- Retired: February 2, 2014

Wataru Inoue (井上 亘, Inoue Wataru; born July 27, 1973) is a Japanese retired professional wrestler working for New Japan Pro-Wrestling (NJPW).

== Professional wrestling career ==
Inoue made his debut on New Japan Pro-Wrestling in 1999. He aligned himself with New Japan Junior Seikigun, a face stable created in order to counteract Jyushin Thunder Liger's Control Terrorism Unit in the latter half of 2005. Within this feud against the CTU, Inoue became known for his physical toughness after surviving a brutal Brainbuster from Fergal Devitt in a tag match with Ryusuke Taguchi and Minoru as their respective partners. And another tag team match against Gedo & Jado where he bled profusely from his eyebrow but still picked up for the submission victory for himself & his mentor Kanemoto.

Along with making a name for himself in singles competition, he has also had success in tag team competition with Koji Kanemoto to win the IWGP Junior Heavyweight Tag Team titles in 2005.

Inoue was injured February 2007 and did not return until July of the same year where he & his mentor Koji Kanemoto lost an IWGP Jr. Tag Team Title Match against Kai En Tai. Inoue was pinned after a Michinoku Driver and was visibly disappointed with his effort, as he realized he had lived up to the "underachieving loser" label he had been given. He left New Japan for a learning excursion in Mexico and added strength (going from 185 to 208 pounds) and more of a lucharesu or technical style similar to that of Dean Malenko, who Inoue admired growing up. He returned in November with his sights set on Ryusuke Taguchi and the IWGP Jr. Heavyweight Title with upgraded versions of his finishing moves at his disposal. The Staggerin' Blow was now a driver called the "Oracion Flame" & switched the roll that started the Triangle Lancer for a leg grapevine that would make it harder for his opponent to reach the ropes. On December 8, 2007, Inoue defeated Ryusuke Taguchi to capture his first IWGP Junior Heavyweight title, he defeated Taguchi in a rematch for the title on January 27, 2008. He vacated the title on June 16, 2008 after graduating to the heavyweight division and one day after winning the Best of the Super Juniors Tournament. Since turn heavyweight, Inoue struggled in the division to find some success. In the fall of 2009 Inoue joined Yuji Nagata, Mitsuhide Hirasawa and Super Strong Machine to form the stable Seigigun ("Blue Justice Army"). On May 3, 2010, at Wrestling Dontaku 2010 Inoue and Yuji Nagata defeated No Limit (Yujiro Takahashi and Tetsuya Naito) and Bad Intentions (Giant Bernard and Karl Anderson) in a three-way match to win the IWGP Tag Team Championship. On June 19 at Dominion 6.19, Inoue and Nagata lost the Tag Team Championship to Bernard and Anderson in a three-way elimination match, which also included No Limit. In September Mitsushide Hirasawa left for a learning excursion to Puerto Rico and his spot in Seigigun was given to newcomer King Fale. On October 22, 2010, Inoue and Nagata entered the 2010 G1 Tag League. After four wins and a loss, Inoue and Nagata won their block and advanced to the semifinals of the tournament, where, on November 7, they defeated the IWGP Tag Team Champions, Giant Bernard and Karl Anderson. In the finals of the tournament Inoue and Nagata defeated Tetsuya Naito and Yujiro Takahashi to win the 2010 G1 Tag League. As a result of their victory, Inoue and Nagata received a shot at the IWGP Tag Team Championship on December 11, 2010, but were defeated by the defending champions, Bad Intentions. On March 4, 2013, Inoue suffered a neck injury, which led to his announcement of his retirement from professional wrestling on February 2, 2014. He will remain with New Japan in a backstage role. On April 2, New Japan held an event commemorating Inoue's career, concluding with his retirement ceremony.

== Championships and accomplishments ==
- New Japan Pro-Wrestling
  - IWGP Junior Heavyweight Championship (1 time)
  - IWGP Junior Heavyweight Tag Team Championship (1 time) – with Koji Kanemoto
  - IWGP Tag Team Championship (1 time) – with Yuji Nagata
  - Best of the Super Juniors (2008)
  - G1 Tag League (2010) – with Yuji Nagata
- Pro Wrestling Illustrated
  - Ranked No. 118 of the top 500 wrestlers in the PWI 500 in 2008
