= List of professional wrestling promotions in Japan =

This is a list of professional wrestling promotions in Japan which includes both national and independent puroresu and joshi companies from the post-World War II period up to the present day.

== Major promotions ==
=== Puroresu ===
Name	Location	Owner(s)	Years active	Notes
All Japan Pro Wrestling	Yokohama, Kanagawa	Tsuyoki Fukuda	1972–	Affiliated with National Wrestling Alliance until 1990.
DDT Pro-Wrestling	Tokyo	CyberAgent	1997–	As of July 2020, DDT is promoted as one of the three brands under the CyberFight umbrella.
Dragongate	Kobe, Hyōgo	Gaora	2004–	Known as Toryumon Japan from 1997 to 2004.
New Japan Pro-Wrestling	Tokyo	TV Asahi (46.3%) CyberAgent (46.3%) Amuse Inc. (5%)	1972–	
Pro Wrestling Noah	Tokyo	CyberAgent	2000–	As of July 2020, Noah is promoted as one of the three brands under the CyberFight umbrella.

=== Joshi ===
Name	Location	Owner(s)	Years active	Notes
World Wonder Ring Stardom	Tokyo	Bushiroad	2010–	
Tokyo Joshi Pro-Wrestling	Tokyo	CyberAgent	2012–	As of July 2020, TJPW is promoted as one of the three brands under the CyberFight umbrella.

== Independent promotions ==
=== Puroresu ===
Name	Location	Owner(s)	Years active	Notes
Active Advance Pro Wrestling	Chiba	Taka Michinoku	2002–	Known as Kaientai Dojo and K-Dojo until 2019
Asuka Pro Wrestling	Tokyo	Akira Shinose	2014–	Previously named Asuka Project until 2019.
Best Body Japan Pro-Wrestling	Tokyo	Tomokazu Taniguchi	2018–	
Big Japan Pro Wrestling	Yokohama, Kanagawa	Eiji Tosaka	1995–	
Braves	Tokyo	Hyper Brave G Valion	2006–	
Capture International	Tokyo	Koki Kitahara	1997–	
Colega Pro Wrestling	Osaka	The Bodyguard	2021–	
Come on Wrestling Party	Tokyo	Shinichiro Tominaga	2012–	Previously named COWPER until 2015.
Dotonbori Pro Wrestling	Osaka	Dotonbori Entertainment System	2013–	
Dove Pro Wrestling	Hiroshima	Gunso	2005–	
Dradition	Tokyo	Tatsumi Fujinami	2008–	
Ehime Pro-Wrestling	Ehime	Erina Tanaka	2016–	
Frontier Martial-Arts Wrestling Explosion	Greater Tokyo Area	Akihito Ichihara; Yukihide Ueno	1989–2002; 2015–	Previously named Frontier Martial Arts Wrestling.
Gamshara Pro-Wrestling	Kitakyushu, Fukuoka	Smith	2003–	
Ganbare☆Pro-Wrestling	Tokyo	Ken Ohka	2013–	Originally a special event by parent company DDT, GanPro became its own promotion and became part of the CyberFight umbrella in July 2020, along with DDT. In April 2024, the promotion split from CyberFight to become independent.
Gleat	Tokyo	LIDET Entertainment	2020–	Founded by the former parent company of Pro Wrestling Noah, the promotion styles itself as something of a spiritual successor of the UWF and UWFi.
Hard Hit	Tokyo	Hikaru Sato	2015–	Originally a series of events under DDT Pro-Wrestling, Hard Hit established itself as an independent promotion in 2015.
Hitachi Pro Wrestling	Kanto region		2008–	
Hokuto Pro Wrestling	Hokkaido	Crane Nakajo	2004–	
Hot Shushu	Saitama	Chiharu	2023–	Sister promotion of Ice Ribbon.
Itabashi Pro-Wrestling	Itabashi, Tokyo	Hayate	2014–	
Kyushu Pro-Wrestling	Fukuoka	Ryota Chikuzen	2007–	
Land's End Pro-Wrestling	Tokyo	Ryoji Sai	2016–	
Lion's Gate Project	Tokyo	Bushiroad	2015–	Developmental branch of New Japan Pro Wrestling.
Michinoku Pro Wrestling	Morioka, Iwate	Jinsei Shinzaki	1993–	
Mobius	Fukuoka	Masao Orihara	1997–	
Mutoha Pro-Wrestling	Japan	Hidekazu Yoshino	2007–	Previously named Mumeijuku until 2016. Also produces events under the BKF and Third Brand brands.
New Nemuro Pro Wrestling	Nemuro, Hokkaido	Kenji Miyamoto	2006–	
Osaka Pro Wrestling	Osaka	Zeus	1999–	
Ossan Style Wrestling	Osaka		2019–	Originally called Osaka Style Wrestling, the promotion restarted as Ossan Style Wrestling in 2020.
P.P.P. Tokyo	Tokyo	Masayuki Mitomi	2019–	
Pro-Wrestling Basara	Shinjuku, Tokyo	Isami Kodaka	2015–	Continuation of Union Pro Wrestling. Pro Wrestling Basara spun off from DDT Pro-Wrestling on January 1, 2020.
Pro Wrestling Dewa	Tohoku region	Lock Suzuki	2004–	
Pro Wrestling Freedoms	Tokyo	Takashi Sasaki	2009–	
Pro Wrestling FTO	Ōita	Skull Reaper A-ji	2004–	
Pro Wrestling Heat-Up	Kawasaki	Kazuhiro Tamura	2012–	
Pro-Wrestling Kageki	Fukuoka	Azteca	1997–	Stylized as Pro-Wrestling Ka☆geki.
Pro Wrestling Secret Base	Tokyo	Mototsugu Shimizu; Jun Ogawauchi	2009–	Continuation of El Dorado Wrestling.
Pro-Wrestling Shi-En	Osaka	Eiji Sahara	2010–	
Pro-Wrestling Team Dera	Nagoya, Aichi	Kengo Takai	2008–	Founded in 2008 as Dera Nagoya Pro-Wrestling. Closed and then relaunched as Team Dera in 2009.
Pro Wrestling Zero1	Tokyo	First On Stage Inc.	2001–	
Burst Pro Wrestling	Kanzaki, Saga	Towa Iwasaki	2021–	
Professional Wrestling Just Tap Out	Tokyo	Taka Michinoku	2019–	
Professional Wrestling Wallabee	Saitama Prefecture	Keita Yano	2009–	
Ryukyu Dragon Pro-Wrestling	Okinawa	Gurukun Mask	2013–	
SGP	Nagoya	Ultraman Robin	1994–	Known as Theater Pro-Wrestling SGP Nagoya Kachofugetsu between 2014 and 2018.
Strong Style Pro-Wrestling	Tokyo	Satoru Sayama	2005–	Known as Real Japan Pro-Wrestling until 2019.
Tenryu Project	Tokyo	Genichiro Tenryu	2010–2015; 2020–	Closed in 2015 after promoters retirement, re-established in 2020.
Tochigi Pro-Wrestling	Utsunomiya, Tochigi	Kamiu Trust Holdings, Inc.	2021–	Antenna of Zero1 in the Tochigi Prefecture.
Tokyo Gurentai	Tokyo	Nosawa Rongai; Mazada	2010–	
TTT Pro-Wrestling	Tokyo	Guts Ishijima	2020–	Also known as Total Triumph Team, Indie Unified TTT Pro-Wrestling and Triple T.
Underground Wrestling Exit	Tokyo	Fugofugo Yumeji	2008–	Associated with World Underground Wrestling in Austria.
Wrestling of Darkness 666	Tokyo	Onryo	2003–	Also known as Triple Six.

=== Joshi ===
Name	Location	Owner(s)	Years active	Notes
Actwres girl'Z	Tokyo	Super Project Co. Ltd.	2015–	
Dream Star Fighting Marigold	Tokyo	Rossy Ogawa	2024–	
Gatoh Move	Tokyo	Emi Sakura	2012–	Formerly based in Thailand.
Girl's Prowrestling Unit Color's	Tokyo	Saki	2022–	
Ice Ribbon	Warabi	Rebellions Co. Ltd.	2006–	
Ladies Legend Pro-Wrestling-X	Toshima	Rumi Kazama; Shinobu Kandori	1992–	
Marvelous That's Women Pro Wrestling	Funabashi	Marvelcompany, Inc.	2014–	
Oz Academy	Tokyo	Mayumi Ozaki	1998–	
Pro-Wrestling Evolution	Tokyo	Suwama	2022–	
Pro Wrestling Wave	Tokyo	Zabun Co, Ltd.	2007–	Sister promotion of Osaka Joshi Pro-Wrestling.
Pure-J	Adachi, Tokyo	Command Bolshoi	2017–	
Seadlinnng	Kawasaki	Nanae Takahashi	2015–	
Sendai Girls' Pro Wrestling	Sendai	Meiko Satomura	2005–	
World Woman Pro-Wrestling Diana	Kawasaki, Kanagawa	Kyoko Inoue	2011-	

== Defunct promotions ==
=== Puroresu ===
Name	Location	Owner(s)	Years active	Notes
Apache Pro-Wrestling Army	Tokyo	Kintaro Kanemura	2004–2016	
Battlarts	Koshigaya	Yuki Ishikawa	1996–2011	
Big Mouth Loud	Tokyo	Fumihiko Uwai	2005–2006	
Diamond Ring	Yoshikawa	Kensuke Sasaki; Akira Hokuto	2003–2013	Previously named Kensuke Office.
Dragondoor Project	Tokyo	Noriaki Kawabata	2005–2006	
Fighting Network Rings	Tokyo	Akira Maeda	1991–2002	Continuation of Newborn UWF. Revived as a pure mixed martial arts promotion (The Outsider series) in 2008.
Fu-Ten Promotion	Fukuoka	Daisuke Ikeda	2005–2015	
Global Professional Wrestling Alliance	Tokyo	Yoshiyuki Nakamura	2006–2009	
Hustle	Greater Tokyo Area	Nobuhiko Takada	2004–2011	
Inoki Genome Federation	Tokyo	Simon Inoki	2007–2019	
International Wrestling Association of Japan	Tokyo	Tatsukuni Asano	1994–2014	Continuation of W*ING. In the 2000s evolved into a King's Road style promotion featuring sports-entertainment elements. Known to consistently feature AJPW talents and 1980s era WWE Hall of Famers on TV, where they wrestled on a regular basis.
International Wrestling Enterprise	Tokyo	Isao Yoshiwara	1966–1981	Associated with the American Wrestling Association from 1970, and the Japan Pro-Wrestling Commission with New Japan Pro Wrestling until 1981.
Japan Pro Wrestling	Tokyo	Riki Choshu	1984–1987	
Japan Wrestling Association	Tokyo	Rikidōzan	1953–1973	Affiliated with the National Wrestling Alliance. Membership was transferred to AJPW.
Kingdom	Tokyo	Ken Suzuki	1997–1998	Continuation of UWF International.
New Tokyo Pro Wrestling	Tokyo	Takashi Ishikawa	1994–1996	
Onita Pro	Tokyo	Atsushi Onita	1999–2012	Also known as Onita FMW in 2002.
Pioneer Senshi	Tokyo	Ryuma Go; Apollo Sugawara; Masahiko Takasugi	1988–1990	
Pro Wrestling Crusaders	Tokyo	Shunji Takano; George Takano	1993–1997	Branched out of Super World of Sports.
Pro Wrestling El Dorado	Tokyo	Noriaki Kawabata; Koji Fujinaga	2006–2008	Continuation of Dragondoor Project.
Pro Wrestling Fujiwara Gumi	Tokyo	Yoshiaki Fujiwara; Masakatsu Funaki; Minoru Suzuki	1991–1995	
PWC Promotion	Tokyo	Toshiyuki Moriya	2003–2005	Continuation of Pro Wrestling Crusaders.
Riki Pro	Tokyo	Riki Choshu; Katsuji Nagashima	2004–2010	Also known as World Japan Pro Wrestling or Fighting of World Japan.
Smash	Tokyo	Yoshihiro Tajiri; Akira Shoji	2010–2012	Continuation of Hustle.
Super World of Sports	Tokyo	Hachiro Tanaka	1990–1992	Associated with the World Wrestling Federation.
Tokyo Pro Wrestling	Tokyo	Toyonobori	1966–1967	
Union Pro Wrestling	Shinjuku, Tokyo	Naomi Susan; DDT Pro-Wrestling	1993–1995; 2004–2015	
Universal Lucha Libre	Tokyo	Hisashi Shinma	1990–1995; 1998	
Universal Wrestling Federation	Matsumoto	Hisashi Shinma	1984–1986	Revived as the Newborn UWF in 1988 and again in 1991 as Union of Wrestling Forces International (UWF International or UWFi).
Uwai Station Freestyle Pro-Wrestling	Tokyo	Fumihiko Uwai	2006–2007	Continuation of Big Mouth Loud.
UWF International	Tokyo	Nobuhiko Takada	1991–1996	Continuation of Universal Wrestling Federation.
Wrestle-1	Tokyo	Keiji Mutoh	2013–2020	
Wrestle Association "R"	Tokyo	Genichiro Tenryu; Masatomo Takei	1992–2006	Branched out of Super World of Sports.
Wrestling International New Generations	Tokyo	Kiyoshi Ibaragi; Víctor Quiñones	1991–1994	Associated with the World Wrestling Council.
Wrestling Marvelous Future	Tokyo	Hayabusa	2002–2008	
Wrestling New Classic	Tokyo	Yoshihiro Tajiri	2012–2014	Continuation of Smash. Sister promotion of Reina Joshi Puroresu.

=== Joshi ===
Name	Location	Owner(s)	Years active	Notes
All Japan Women's Pro-Wrestling	Tokyo	Kunimatsu Matsunaga; Takashi Matsunaga	1972–2005	
Arsion	Tokyo	Rossy Ogawa	1997–2003	
Gaea Japan	Tokyo	Yuka Sugiyama; Chigusa Nagayo	1995–2005	
Ibuki	Tokyo		2005-2010	
JDStar	Tokyo	Yoshimoto Kogyo Company; J Office Group	1995–2007	
JWP Joshi Puroresu	Tokyo	Kiyoshi Shinozaki; Masatoshi Yamamoto	1992–2017	
NEO Japan Ladies Pro-Wrestling	Yokohama	Kyoko Inoue	1997–2010	

== See also ==
- List of professional wrestling attendance records in Japan
- List of professional wrestling promotions
- List of women's wrestling promotions
