= U-Kei (martial arts) =

Japanese combat sports term

U-Kei (Japanese: U系, Hepburn: Yū Kei; lit. U-Series, U-Group or Class U) is a Japanese combat sports related term that refers to shoot style professional wrestling, martial arts, or mixed martial arts organizations that have roots in or are influenced by the Universal Wrestling Federation (UWF). Through various splits, the U-Kei system also came to encompass deathmatch, lucharesu, and sports entertainment promotions.

"U" refers to the UWF, a Japanese professional wrestling promotion that was active from 1984 to 1986. The UWF was founded by Hisashi Shinma and Akira Maeda after their departures from New Japan Pro-Wrestling. The UWF is credited with pioneering the shoot style of wrestling, which provided the foundation of modern mixed martial arts in both Japan and overseas.

Following the collapse of the original UWF in 1986, the professional wrestling and mixed martial arts organizations that derived from the promotion became collectively known as "UWF-Kei", later shortened to "U-Kei".

== Background ==
The Universal Wrestling Federation (UWF) was founded in 1984 by Hisashi Shinma and Akira Maeda following their departures from New Japan Pro-Wrestling (NJPW). The original UWF roster included Maeda, Rusher Kimura, Ryuma Go, Mach Hayato, and Gran Hamada. Soon, however, they were joined by Yoshiaki Fujiwara, Nobuhiko Takada, Kazuo Yamazaki, and Satoru Sayama. The arrival of these wrestlers changed the orientation of the UWF's wrestling from a traditional puroresu style to a more martial arts-oriented style. Maeda, Fujiwara, Takada, Yamazaki, and Sayama had been martial artists before joining NJPW, and they began incorporating amateur wrestling and other legitimate martial arts techniques, including catch wrestling holds and kickboxing strikes, which created a new form of wrestling called shoot style. Kimura, Go, and Hamada, unable to cope with the new shoot style of wrestling, decided to leave and join All Japan Pro Wrestling (AJPW) instead. Shinma would also depart for AJPW after disputes with Sayama.

By 1985, Sayama had become alienated from the rest of the UWF. While the shoot style of wrestling introduced by Sayama was successful in increasing fan interest, many UWF wrestlers believed he held too much creative control and booking power. This came to a head in September 1985 when Maeda did not pull a kick during a match with Sayama, kicking him hard in the groin and causing a legitimate disqualification. As a result, Maeda was suspended and later fired by the UWF. Sayama, embittered with wrestling after this match, left the UWF and formed Shooto, one of the first mixed martial arts (MMA) promotions. Without its two top stars, the promotion dissolved and much of the roster returned to NJPW.

In 1988, Maeda was suspended from NJPW for intentionally injuring Riki Choshu with a kick and was eventually dismissed from the promotion for refusing to go on an overseas tour in Mexico. After his dismissal from NJPW, Maeda and the former UWF wrestlers founded a new promotion, Newborn UWF. Newborn UWF set the standard for shoot style wrestling, with a focus on "clean finishes" – matches that ended in submissions or knockouts. This marked the first time Japanese wrestling fans could routinely see clear-cut winners and losers as NJPW and AJPW were still using the American-originated standard of countout and disqualification finishes at the time. After internal issues, Newborn UWF closed its doors following a farewell card on December 1, 1990 in Matsumoto, Nagano. Also in 1990, Shinma and Hamada founded a new "Universal" promotion, Universal Lucha Libre. This was preceded by Shinma and Hamada's Martial Arts Union pulling its support from Atsushi Onita's Frontier Martial-Arts Wrestling.

In 1991, three Newborn UWF successor promotions were formed: Takada's Union of Wrestling Forces International, Maeda's Fighting Network Rings, and Fujiwara's Pro Wrestling Fujiwara Gumi. The promotions founded after the collapses of the UWF and Newborn UWF began being referred to as part of the U-Kei (U-Group). U-Kei promotions, Pancrase (founded in 1993) and the Pride Fighting Championships (founded in 1997), emerged as two of the most notable MMA promotions in Japan. Pride Fighting Championships was later acquired by its rival Ultimate Fighting Championship in 2007.

== List of promotions or events referred to as U-Kei ==
- Submission Arts Wrestling (derived from Universal Wrestling Federation)
- Combat Wrestling/International Federation of Combat Wrestling (derived from Universal Wrestling Federation)
- Shoot Boxing (derived from Universal Wrestling Federation)
- Shooto (offshoot of Universal Wrestling Federation founded by Satoru Sayama)
  - Shooto Brasil (Brazil-based sister promotion of Shooto)
- Newborn UWF (reorganization of Universal Wrestling Federation)
- Martial Arts Union (offshoot of Newborn UWF founded by Hisashi Shinma and Gran Hamada)
- Universal Lucha Libre (offshoot of Martial Arts Union)
- Frontier Martial-Arts Wrestling (offshoot of Martial Arts Union founded by Atsushi Onita)
- W*ING/Shin W*ING (offshoot of Frontier Martial-Arts Wrestling)
- World W*ING Spirit (successor to W*ING/Shin W*ING)
- IWA Japan (successor to W*ING/Shin W*ING)
  - IWA Puerto Rico (Puerto Rico-based sister promotion of IWA Japan)
- Gatoh Move Pro Wrestling/ChocoPro (claims lineage of IWA Japan)
- Setup Thailand Pro Wrestling (claims lineage of IWA Japan)
- IWA Thailand (claims lineage of IWA Japan)
- Super FMW (offshoot of Frontier Martial-Arts Wrestling)
- Onita Pro (offshoot of Frontier Martial-Arts Wrestling)
- Wrestlings Marvelous Future (successor to Frontier Martial-Arts Wrestling)
- World Entertainment Wrestling/Fuyuki-Gun Promotion (successor to Frontier Martial-Arts Wrestling)
- Apache Pro-Wrestling Army (successor to World Entertainment Wrestling/Fuyuki-Gun Promotion)
- Xtreme Wrestling Force (offshoot of Apache Pro-Wrestling Army)
- Pro Wrestling Freedoms (successor to Apache Pro-Wrestling Army)
- Pro-Wrestling A-Team (successor to Apache Pro-Wrestling Army)
- Chō Sentō Puroresu FMW (successor to Frontier Martial-Arts Wrestling)
- Frontier Martial-Arts Wrestling-Explosion (successor to Chō Sentō Puroresu FMW)
- Seishin Kaikan (run by Masashi Aoyagi, a former Frontier Martial-Arts Wrestling wrestler)
- New Stage Battle Wrestling (successor to Seishin Kaikan)
- Pro Wrestling Fujiwara Gumi (successor to Newborn UWF founded by Yoshiaki Fujiwara)
- Union of Wrestling Forces International (successor to Newborn UWF founded by Nobuhiko Takada)
- Fighting Network Rings (successor to Newborn UWF founded by Akira Maeda)
  - Rings Holland (Netherlands-based sister promotion of Fighting Network Rings)
  - Rings Australia (Australia-based sister promotion of Fighting Network Rings)
  - Rings Lithuania (Lithuania-based sister promotion of Fighting Network Rings)
  - Rings Georgia (Georgia-based sister promotion of Fighting Network Rings)
  - Rings Russia (Russia-based sister promotion of Fighting Network Rings)
  - Rings USA (US-based sister promotion of Fighting Network Rings)
  - Rings Ireland (Ireland-based sister promotion of Fighting Network Rings)
- Pancrase (offshoot of Pro Wrestling Fujiwara Gumi founded by Masakatsu Funaki and Minoru Suzuki)
- International Shootfighting Association (offshoot of Pro Wrestling Fujiwara Gumi founded by Masami Soranaka and Bart Vale)
- Battlarts (offshoot of Pro Wrestling Fujiwara Gumi founded by Yuki Ishikawa)
- Japan Professional Wrestling Association (offshoot of Pro Wrestling Fujiwara Gumi)
- Unified Shoot Wrestling Federation (offshoot of Union of Wrestling Forces International founded by Steve Nelson)
- Kingdom (successor to Union of Wrestling Forces International)
- K-1 (offshoot of Fighting Network Rings founded by Kazuyoshi Ishii)
- U-File Camp (successor to Fighting Network Rings founded by Kiyoshi Tamura)
- U-Style Pro-Wrestling (offshoot of U-File Camp)
- ZST (successor to Fighting Network Rings)
- Deep (sister promotion of ZST)
- Pride Fighting Championships (offshoot of Kingdom)
- U-Dream '98 (offshoot of Kingdom)
- Kingdom Ehrgeiz (successor to Kingdom run by Hidetada Irie)
- Fuchu Wrestling Union (sister promotion of Kingdom Ehrgeiz)
- Tachikawa Wrestling Force (sister promotion of Kingdom Ehrgeiz)
- Seikendo/Ultimate Boxing (offshoot of Shooto)
- Kitao Dojo (run by Kōji Kitao, a former Union of Wrestling Forces International wrestler)
- Capture International (run by Koki Kitahara, student of Shooto founder Satoru Sayama)
- Ladies Legend Pro-Wrestling (run by Shinobu Kandori, student of Yoshiaki Fujiwara)
- Kana Pro (run by Kana, student of Battlarts founder Yuki Ishikawa)
- Real Japan Pro-Wrestling/Strong Style Pro-Wrestling (run by Satoru Sayama, founder of Shooto)
- Getto (run by Shuichiro Katsumura, a former Shooto fighter)
- Shiatāpuroresu Kachōfūgetsu (sister promotion of Getto)
- ReMix/Smackgirl (run by Koichiro Kimura, a former Vale Tudo Japan fighter)
- Ax (successor to ReMix/Smackgirl)
- Jewels (successor to ReMix/Smackgirl; sister promotion of Deep)
- Fu-ten Promotion (offshoot of Battlarts founded by Daisuke Ikeda)
- Soul Mode (run by Manabu Suruga, former Battlarts wrestler)
- The Tempest Dragon (run by Ryuji Walter, former Battlarts wrestler)
- Professional Wrestling Wallabee (run by Keita Yano, former Battlarts wrestler)
- Battle Arts (run by Santino Marella, former Battlarts wrestler)
- Battle Art Pro-Wrestling (run by Yujiro Yamamoto, former Battlarts wrestler)
- Kakuto Tanteidan (successor to Battlarts)
- Gankopuroresu (offshoot of U-Style Pro-Wrestling)
- Style-E Pro Wrestling (offshoot of U-Style Pro-Wrestling)
- E-Next (successor to Style-E Pro Wrestling)
- Pro Wrestling Heat Up (successor to Style-E Pro Wrestling)
- Krush (sister promotion of K-1)
- Oita Attractive Merry World Pro-Wrestling (successor to Universal Lucha Libre)
- Pro Wrestling FTO (offshoot of Oita Attractive Merry World Pro-Wrestling)
- Michinoku Pro Wrestling (offshoot of Universal Lucha Libre)
- Osaka Pro Wrestling (offshoot of Michinoku Pro Wrestling)
- Dotonbori Pro Wrestling (offshoot of Osaka Pro Wrestling)
- Osaka Style Wrestling (offshoot of Osaka Pro Wrestling)
- Okinawa Pro Wrestling (offshoot of Osaka Pro Wrestling)
- Ryukyu Dragon Pro Wrestling (successor to Okinawa Pro Wrestling)
- Kaisen Puroresu/Seafood Pro Wrestling (successor to Okinawa Pro Wrestling)
- 2point5 Joshi Pro-Wrestling (sister promotion of Kaisen Puroresu/Seafood Pro Wrestling)
- Hero's (offshoot of K-1 run by Akira Maeda)
- K-1 Rumble on the Rock (offshoot of K-1)
- Hustle/Hustle Man's World (sister promotion of Pride Fighting Championships)
- Smash (successor to Hustle/Hustle Man's World; merged with Pancrase)
- Wrestling New Classic (successor to Smash)
- WNC-Reina (sister promotion to Wrestling New Classic)
- Dream (successor to Pride Fighting Championships)
- Rizin Fighting Federation (successor to Dream)
- Pancrase Hybrid Wrestling (US-based offshoot of Pancrase)
- Pancracio Lucha (sister promotion of Pancrase Hybrid Wrestling)
- Hard Hit (run by Hikaru Sato, a fighter from Pancrase)
- Impact Fighting Federation (run by Takahiro Tababa, a fighter from Kingdom Ehrgeiz)
- Universal Fighting-Arts Organization (claimed lineage of Universal Wrestling Federation; run by Antonio Inoki with support from Satoru Sayama)
- Inoki Genome Federation (successor to Universal Fighting-Arts Organization)
- Inoki Sports Management/Lucha Wrestling Puroresu (offshoot of Inoki Genome Federation)
- ISM (offshoot of Inoki Genome Federation)
- Hagure IGF International (offshoot of Inoki Genome Federation)
- Eastern Heroes (offshoot of Inoki Genome Federation)
- Inoki Genki Factory (successor to Inoki Genome Federation)
- Knuckleheadz Pro Wrestling (offshoot of Inoki Sports Management/Lucha Wrestling Puroresu)
- Alma Libre (run by Akira Jo, a former Inoki Genome Federation wrestler)
- Dragon Fighting Wrestling (run by Tian Bing, a former Inoki Genome Federation wrestler)
- Big Mouth Loud (claimed lineage of Universal Wrestling Federation)
- Uwai Station (successor to Big Mouth Loud)
- Quintet (run by Kazushi Sakuraba, a former Pride Fighting Championships fighter)
- Valor Bare Knuckle (run by Ken Shamrock, a former King of Pancrase Openweight Champion)
- World Pankration Championships (run by Guy Mezger, a former King of Pancrase Openweight Champion)
- Gleat (claims lineage of Union of Wrestling Forces International)
- HOOKnSHOOT (initially run under Pancrase rules and later became affiliated with Shooto)
- Jigoku Fighting Grand Prix (run under K-1 and Pancrase rules)
- Vale Tudo Japan (event organized by Shooto)
- Wrestle-1 (event organized by K-1, Pride Fighting Championships, and All Japan Pro Wrestling)
- G-Shooto (event organized by Shooto)
- Queen Bee (event organized by Battlarts)
- Arkadia (event organized by ReMix/Smackgirl)
- The Outsider (event organized by Fighting Network Rings)
- Japan MMA League (event organized by Deep and Smash)
- U-Spirits (event organized by Hiromitsu Kanehara, a former Fighting Network Rings wrestler)
- Kakiride (event organized by Masahito Kakihara, a former Union of Wrestling Forces International wrestler)
- Hitamar-U-Style Starlane (event organized by Hitamaru Sasaki, a former U-Style Pro-Wrestling wrestler)
- Next Exciting Wrestling (event organized by Inoki Genome Federation)
- Heavy Hitters/UWFi Rules Contenders Series (event organized by Paradigm Pro Wrestling; claims lineage of Union of Wrestling Forces International)
- Josh Barnett's Bloodsport (event organized by Josh Barnett, the last King of Pancrase Openweight Champion)
- Lidet UWF (event organized by Gleat)

== See also ==
- Professional wrestling in Japan
- Mixed martial arts in Japan
