= Kakuto Tanteidan =

Kakuto Tanteidan (Japanese: 格闘探偵団, Hepburn: Kakutō Tanteidan; lit. "Fighting Detectives") is a series of independent professional wrestling events produced by Fuminori Abe and Takuya Nomura (together known as the tag team Astronauts) since 2023. These events aim to revive the spirit of Kakuto Tanteidan Battlarts, a defunct promotion founded by Yuki Ishikawa in 1996 and focused on a style of shoot wrestling dubbed bati-bati.

== History ==
On June 26, 2023, Fuminori Abe and Takuya Nomura held a press conference to announce they would hold an independent show titled We Are Kakuto Tanteidan (Note: ぼくらは格闘探偵団, Bokura wa Kakutō Tanteidan) on October 12 at Shinjuku Face, broadcast on Wrestle Universe. The idea of reviving Battlarts into a new organization came from founder Abe, a student of Battlarts alumnus Munenori Sawa, who was fascinated by the promotion and aspired to become a professional wrestler, with the ideal of creating a "state-of-the-art B". The decision to organize an independent event was made in cooperation with Nomura, and with the support of Battlarts founder Yuki Ishikawa, Ikuto Hidaka and others.

A second event titled Kakuto Tanteidan 2: From Shinjuku With Love (Note: 格闘探偵団2〜新宿より愛をこめて〜, Kakutō Tanteidan Tsū: Shinjuku yori ai o komete) was held on October 23, 2024.

In 2025, a third event titled Kakuto Tanteidan III: One Life to Live (Note: 格闘探偵団Ⅲ～One Life to Live～, Kakutō Tanteidan Surī: One Life to Live) was held at Shin-Kiba 1st Ring on April 8, followed by Kakuto Tanteidan IV: Straight Ahead (Note: 格闘探偵団Ⅳ～Straight ahead～, Kakutō Tanteidan Fō: Straight ahead) on October 23, back at Shinjuku.

On July 1, 2026, the promotion held Kakuto Tanteidan V: One Last Dance: Shinjuku (Note: 格闘探偵団Ⅴ～ONE LAST DANCE: SHINJUKU～, Kakutō Tanteidan Faibu: One Last Dance: Shinjuku) at Shinjuku Face, three months before the scheduled closure of the venue.

== Events ==
| # | Event | Date | City | Venue | Main event | Ref. |
|---|---|---|---|---|---|---|
| 1 | We Are Kakuto Tanteidan | October 12, 2023 | Tokyo, Japan | Shinjuku Face | Fuminori Abe vs. Takuya Nomura | |
| 2 | Kakuto Tanteidan 2: From Shinjuku With Love | October 23, 2024 | Tokyo, Japan | Shinjuku Face | Fuminori Abe and Yuki Ishikawa vs. Takuya Nomura and Kazunari Murakami | |
| 3 | Kakuto Tanteidan III: One Life to Live | April 8, 2025 | Tokyo, Japan | Shin-Kiba 1st Ring | Astronauts (Fuminori Abe and Takuya Nomura) vs. Hikaru Sato and Manabu Hara | |
| 4 | Kakuto Tanteidan IV: Straight Ahead | October 23, 2025 | Tokyo, Japan | Shinjuku Face | Fuminori Abe vs. Hikaru Sato | |
| 5 | Kakuto Tanteidan V: One Last Dance: Shinjuku | July 1, 2026 | Tokyo, Japan | Shinjuku Face | Fuminori Abe, Shuji Ishikawa and Yuki Ishikawa vs. Ali Najima, Daisuke Ikeda and Kazunari Murakami | |

== Results ==
=== We Are Kakuto Tanteidan ===
The first event of the Kakuto Tanteidan revival project took place on October 12, 2023, at Shinjuku Face in Tokyo.

| No. | Results | Stipulations | Times |
|---|---|---|---|
| 1 | Hideki Suzuki defeated Yu Iizuka by technical knockout | Singles match | 6:56 |
| 2 | Hikaru Sato and "brother" Yasshi defeated Ikuto Hidaka and Thanomsak Toba by submission | Tag team match | 10:41 |
| 3 | Super Tiger II defeated Keita Yano by technical knockout | Singles match | 11:05 |
| 4 | Yuki Ishikawa and Daisuke Sekimoto defeated Daisuke Ikeda and Minoru Fujita by submission | Tag team match | 13:57 |
| 5 | Fuminori Abe defeated Takuya Nomura by submission | Singles match | 19:16 |

=== Kakuto Tanteidan 2: From Shinjuku With Love ===
The second Kakuto Tanteidan event took place on October 23, 2024, at Shinjuku Face in Tokyo.

| No. | Results | Stipulations | Times |
|---|---|---|---|
| 1 | Hikaru Sato defeated Kosuke Sato by submission | Singles match | 9:13 |
| 2 | "brother" Yasshi and Hikaru Machida defeated Thanomsak Toba and Manabu Hara by knockout | Tag team match | 12:28 |
| 3 | Masashi Takeda defeated Kengo by submission | Singles match | 11:54 |
| 4 | Ikuto Hidaka vs. Minoru Fujita ended in a double knockout draw | Singles match | 18:46 |
| 5 | Takuya Nomura and Kazunari Murakami defeated Fuminori Abe and Yuki Ishikawa by submission | Tag team match | 27:54 |

=== Kakuto Tanteidan III: One Life to Live ===
The third Kakuto Tanteidan event took place on April 8, 2025, at Shin-Kiba 1st Ring in Tokyo.

| No. | Results | Stipulations | Times |
|---|---|---|---|
| 1 | Shuji Ishikawa defeated Satsuki Nagao by technical knockout | Singles match | 10:38 |
| 2 | Masashi Takeda defeated Kosuke Sato by technical knockout | Singles match | 10:19 |
| 3 | Yuki Ishikawa and Tyson Maeguchi defeated Super Tiger II and Thanomsak Toba by submission | Tag team match | 13:38 |
| 4 | Dan Tamura defeated "brother" Yasshi by technical knockout | Singles match | 11:20 |
| 5 | Astronauts (Fuminori Abe and Takuya Nomura) defeated Hikaru Sato and Manabu Hara by submission | Tag team match | 28:47 |

=== Kakuto Tanteidan IV: Straight Ahead ===
The fourth Kakuto Tanteidan event took place on October 23, 2025, at Shinjuku Face in Tokyo.

| No. | Results | Stipulations | Times |
|---|---|---|---|
| 1 | Kosuke Sato defeated Ali Najima by submission | Singles match | 6:28 |
| 2 | Yuko Miyamoto and "brother" Yasshi defeated Kengo Mashimo and Thanomsak Toba by knockout | Tag team match | 12:17 |
| 3 | Keita Yano defeated Manabu Hara by submission | Singles match | 17:25 |
| 4 | Yuki Ishikawa and Muhammad Yone defeated Daisuke Ikeda and Ikuto Hidaka by submission | Tag team match | 18:59 |
| 5 | Hikaru Sato defeated Fuminori Abe by knockout | Singles match | 27:44 |

=== Kakuto Tanteidan V: One Last Dance: Shinjuku ===
The fifth Kakuto Tanteidan event took place on July 1, 2026, at Shinjuku Face in Tokyo.

| No. | Results | Stipulations | Times |
|---|---|---|---|
| 1 | Ali Najima and Hinata Kasai defeated Kosuke Sato and Ryoma Sekimo by submission | Tag team match for a spot in the main event | 11:20 |
| 2 | Manabu Hara defeated Yasu Urano by submission | Singles match | 9:31 |
| 3 | Ikuto Hidaka, Maika Ozaki and Itsuki Aoki defeated The Masked Hokukado, Kakeru Sekiguchi and Rina Amikura by submission | Six-person tag team match | 10:29 |
| 4 | Masashi Takeda and Mao defeated Yuko Miyamoto and Thanomsak Toba by submission | Tag team match | 11:42 |
| 5 | Keita Yano defeated Minoru Fujita by submission | Singles match | 15:20 |
| 6 | Ali Najima, Daisuke Ikeda and Kazunari Murakami defeated Fuminori Abe, Shuji Ishikawa and Yuki Ishikawa by technical knockout | Six-man tag team match | 17:38 |
