= Dieuseul Berto =

Haitian mixed martial artist

- Born: Dieuseul Berto; March 24, 1958; Modle, Haiti
- Died: December 29, 2018 (aged 60); Florida
- Other names: Tiger
- Height: 5 ft 9 in (1.75 m)
- Weight: 200 lb (91 kg; 14 st)
- Division: Lightweight
- Fighting out of: Winter Haven, Florida, United States
- Team: Tiger's World of Martial Arts
- Years active: 1996, 2001

Mixed martial arts record
- Total: 3
- Wins: 0
- By knockout: 0
- Losses: 3
- By knockout: 1
- By submission: 1
- By decision: 1

Other information
- Mixed martial arts record from Sherdog

Dieuseul Berto (March 24, 1958 – December 29, 2018) was a Haitian-American professional wrestler and mixed martial artist. He is the father of professional boxers Andre Berto and James Edson Berto.

== Background ==
Originally from Modle, Haiti, Berto moved to Florida in 1980. Berto first worked picking fruit and worked in the restaurant industry. Began training in martial arts. He practiced, Shotokan Karate and Jeet Kune Do, until he was introduced to the world of professional wrestling, where he was known as ‘The Caribbean Kid.”

== Professional wrestling career ==
Berto made his professional wrestling debut in 1992 where he worked in Japan for Pro Wrestling Fujiwara Gumi until 1994. His biggest victory was a win over Katsumi Usuda.

On September 10, 1993 Berto wrestled one night for Fighting Network Rings where he lost to Masayuki Naruse.

In 1996, he last wrestled for Battlarts where he would retire from wrestling that year.

== Mixed martial arts career ==
In 1996, Berto competed only at UFC 10 where he lost to Geza Kalman by knockout.

On November 17, 2001, he returned for one more fight losing to Chris Kaouk.

== Personal life ==
In 1996, after retiring from fighting, Berto opened a gym called Tigers World of Martial Arts where he taught MMA and fitness. In 1998, he was critically injured in a car crash where he broke many bones, leading him to a use wheelchair. He eventually was able to walk again.

On December 29, 2018, Berto died at the age of 60 after battling an illness.

In 2021, Berto was inducted into the FL MMA Hall of Fame.

== Mixed martial arts record ==
Professional record breakdown
3 matches	0 wins	3 losses
By knockout	0	1
By submission	0	1
By decision	0	1

Res.	Record	Opponent	Method	Event	Date	Round	Time	Location	Notes
Loss	0-3-0	Chris Kaouk	Decision (unanimous)	Dixie Rumble	November 17, 2001	3	5:00	United States	Lightweight debut.
Loss	0-2-0	Geza Kalman	TKO (punches)	UFC 10	July 12, 1996	1	5:57	Birmingham, Alabama, United States	
Loss	0-1-0	Hugo Duarte	Submission (kimura)	Universal Vale Tudo Fighting	April 5, 1996	1	1:28	Japan	
