= Pro Wrestling Fujiwara Gumi =

Professional wrestling promotion in Japan

- Acronym: PWFG
- Founded: 1991
- Defunct: 1996
- Style: Shoot style
- Headquarters: Tokyo, Japan
- Founder(s): Yoshiaki Fujiwara; Masakatsu Funaki; Minoru Suzuki
- Owner: Yoshiaki Fujiwara
- Predecessor: Newborn UWF
- Successor: Pancrase; International Shootfighting Association; Battlarts; Japan Professional Wrestling Association

Pro Wrestling Fujiwara Group (Purofesshonaru-resuringu Fujiwara-Gumi, プロフェッショナルレスリング藤原組) was a shoot style professional wrestling promotion based in Tokyo, Japan, operating from 1991 to 1996. It was formed by Yoshiaki Fujiwara, Masakatsu Funaki and Minoru Suzuki after the collapse of the second incarnation of the UWF. The company had the financial backing of eyeglass brand Meganesuper Co., Ltd executive Hachiro Tanaka who was also funding Super World Sports (SWS).

Gumi [組] in Japanese means "group", but it is used in the underworld lingo to mean organized crime family. Fujiwara styled himself kumichō [組長], literally, the "gang leader". Its motto was "ONE FOR ALL AND ALL FOR ONE".

Although the company was considered the smallest of the three UWF offshoots, it had a strong roster which included former UWF wrestlers Yusuke Fuke, Bart Vale and future MMA star Ken Shamrock. One of its most successful shows took place at the Tokyo Dome on October 4, 1992, headlined by Funaki versus Maurice Smith, which was attended by a record 40,000 fans. Legendary wrestler Karl Gotch acted as the face of the company, much like Lou Thesz did for fellow promotion UWF International.

In December 1992, Suzuki, Funaki, and Fuke left the promotion over Fujiwara's decision to send PWFG wrestlers to appear for SWS, Universal Lucha Libre and W*ING. The trio would go on to form Pancrase several months later. Fujiwara decided to close down PWFG in November 1995, however, the company was revived briefly for a few shows during the following summer. After 1996, when everyone on the roster except Fujiwara left to form BattlARTS, the Fujiwara Gumi name was kept as the name of the booking office handling Fujiwara's appearances for other promotions. In retrospect, PWFG, along with other shoot style promotions, served as a precursor to mixed martial arts and to popular Japanese MMA promotions, particularly Pride FC.

== Roster ==
- Natives: Yoshiaki Fujiwara, Masakatsu Funaki, Minoru Suzuki, Yusuke Fuke, Kazuo Takahashi, Yuki Ishikawa, Daisuke Ikeda, Katsumi Usuda, Minoru Tanaka, Shoichi Funaki, Mamoru Okamoto, Satoshi Yoneyama (Muhammad Yone)
- Foreigners: Ken Shamrock, Victor Krueger, Joe Malenko, Mark Starr, Dino Ventura, Bart Vale, Jerry Flynn, Starman, Glenn Jacobs, Dieusel Berto

== See also ==
- Professional wrestling in Japan
- List of professional wrestling promotions in Japan
