= Universal Wrestling Federation (Japan) =

Japanese professional wrestling promotion

- The UWF logo. The figures in blue are based on the Greco-Roman sculpture The Wrestlers
- Acronym: UWF
- Founded: 1984
- Defunct: 1990
- Style: Shoot-style
- Headquarters: Tokyo, Japan
- Split from: New Japan Pro-Wrestling
- Successor: Original promotion: Shooto; Second promotion: Universal Lucha Libre; Fighting Network Rings; Pro Wrestling Fujiwara Gumi; UWF International

The original Japan-based Universal Wrestling Federation (UWF) was a Japanese professional wrestling promotion from 1984 to 1986, formed by wrestlers who had left New Japan Pro-Wrestling. It was a pioneer in shoot-style wrestling, which emphasized legitimate techniques and realism. It was revived as the Newborn UWF in 1988, which lasted until 1990. Following its dissolution, its wrestlers went on to form a number of splinter promotions, most notably Nobuhiko Takada's Union of Wrestling Forces International (UWF International or UWFi), which deliberately carried on the UWF name and style until 1996.

UWF's matches were presented as a more realistic form of professional wrestling, rather than relying heavily on the theatrical punches, colorful characters, and elaborate match structures common in mainstream professional wrestling, UWF matches focused on the appearance of an actual combat sport. Its wrestlers trained in and incorporated techniques from actual martial arts and combat sports, particularly catch-as-catch-can wrestling, judo, karate, and other forms of grappling and striking. Matches emphasized hard-looking strikes and kicks, takedowns, suplexes, and submission holds. Although the outcomes were predetermined, the wrestlers aimed to make the contests resemble legitimate fights, with opponents struggling for position, exchanging strikes, and attempting to force each other to submit or knock each other out.

Although short-lived, the UWF transformed Japanese professional wrestling by popularizing a stripped-down, combat-oriented style that emphasized realistic strikes, submission holds and decisive finishes, even influencing the style and presentation of mainstream Japanese wrestling such as NJPW and AJPW. It spawned a number of successor "shoot-wrestling" promotions and organizations collectively nicknamed the "U-Kei", and also served as a predecessor for Japanese mixed martial arts, with many of its alumni founding proto-MMA organizations such as Shooto, Pancrase and RINGS, eventually leading to the creation of Pride Fighting Championships in 1997.

== Original UWF ==
The original UWF was founded in 1984 by Hisashi Shinma and a group of wrestlers who had left New Japan Pro-Wrestling following growing disagreements over the promotion's management and direction. The breakaway group sought to establish a promotion of their own, initially drawing on the established professional wrestling style of New Japan while allowing its wrestlers greater control over the presentation and direction of their matches. Initially, UWF's cards featured conventional professional wrestling matches, including traditional trappings such as acrobatic maneuvers, top-rope jumps, Satoru Sayama continued to performing under his Tiger Mask persona, and even having lucha libre matches.

The original roster included Rusher Kimura, Akira Maeda, Ryuma Go, Mach Hayato, and Gran Hamada. Soon, however, they were joined by Yoshiaki Fujiwara, Nobuhiko Takada, Satoru Sayama (the original Tiger Mask) and Kazuo Yamazaki, and this changed the orientation of the UWF's wrestling from the traditional style to a more martial arts oriented style. Maeda, Fujiwara, Takada, Sayama and Yamazaki had been martial artists before joining New Japan Pro-Wrestling, and they began incorporating amateur wrestling and other legitimate martial arts techniques, including catch wrestling and judo submission holds, karate and kickboxing, which created a new form of wrestling. Kimura, Go, and Hamada, unable to cope with the new style, decided to leave and join All Japan Pro Wrestling instead.

In early 1984, UWF President Hisashi Shinma brokered a deal with the World Wrestling Federation which resulted in a UWF/WWF working relationship. Through this working relationship, one of UWF's top stars Akira Maeda toured the United States with the WWF and even won the promotion's International Heavyweight Championship. The relationship ended on July 23, 1984 after President Shinma jumped from UWF to All Japan Pro Wrestling.

In 1984 another former New Japan wrestler, Osamu Kido, who had trained under Karl Gotch, joined the UWF. But just as the promotion fledged, its top star Sayama started becoming alienated from the rest of the promotion. While the reforms introduced by Sayama were successful in draws, most wrestlers believed he was cramming too much creative power and booking UWF only for himself. This came to a head in September 1985, when Sayama and Maeda. Allegedly stopped pulling their punches and kicks, in a match that fans in Japan refer to as "going cement". A second, brutal match of this kind took place in September of that year, when Maeda and Sayama again began to lay in their strikes. The match ended when Maeda did not pull a kick and instead kicked Sayama hard in the groin, causing a disqualification.

As a result, Maeda was suspended and later fired by the UWF. Sayama, embittered with wrestling after this match, left the UWF and was not heard from again in the wrestling world for 11 years. He went to found a hybrid martial art organization named Shooto. The promotion dissolved and much of the roster returned to New Japan.

At NJPW, they were part of an "invasion" angle in which the returning UWF wrestlers were presented as a rival faction challenging New Japan's established wrestlers. The UWF contingent stood out with their matching tracksuits and stripped-down, militant presentation, entering the arena together and carrying themselves more like a disciplined fighting team than a conventional wrestling stable. The invasion angle initially generated considerable interest, but it gradually fizzled out rather than culminating in a definitive showdown between the two sides, partly because the storyline was undermined by internal tensions and Maeda's suspension after a deliberate and violent shoot kick on NJPW booker Riki Choshu during a match. Maeda and the other UWF wrestlers eventually went their separate ways, with Maeda later reviving the promotion in 1988 as Newborn UWF.

=== Alumni ===
- Natives: Akira Maeda, Gran Hamada, Kazuo Yamazaki, Nobuhiko Takada, Osamu Kido, Rusher Kimura, Ryuma Go, Shigeo Miyato, Super Tiger, Tatsuo Nakano, Yoji Anjo, Yoshiaki Fujiwara
- Foreigners: Cuban Assassin, Bob Sweetan, Dave Finlay, Dean Solkoff, Dutch Mantel, El Signo, El Texano, Joe Solkoff, Larry Hamilton, Leo Burke, Lumberjack, Mano Negra, Mark Lewin, Marty Jones, MS-1, Negro Navarro, Perro Aguayo, Phil Lafleur, Raúl Mata, Ray Steele, Scott Casey, Scott McGhee, Sweet Daddy Siki, Calypso Hurricane

== Newborn UWF ==
Most of the original UWF roster left New Japan yet again in 1988 to reform the UWF, informally known as the Newborn UWF (新生UWF, Shinsei UWF). After Akira Maeda was suspended without pay for intentionally shooting on Riki Choshu and eventually dismissed from New Japan for refusing to go on an overseas excursion to Mexico, Takada, Yamazaki, Yoji Anjo, and rookie Tatsuo Nakano agreed to leave the promotion in February 1988. Newborn UWF actually started in March, with a superb card that set the standard for shoot-style wrestling to follow and the promotion improved and refined the shoot-style that its original incarnation defined. Because clean finishes (as in, submissions or knockouts in the middle of the ring) were used, so the fans could see clear-cut winners and losers, it was more accepted as "real fighting" than New Japan or All Japan, which at the time were still using the American-originated standard of countouts and disqualifications.

Shortly after the death of Japanese Emperor Hirohito in early 1989, Maeda held a meeting with New Japan promoter Antonio Inoki, in which they agreed that Fujiwara, who had remained in New Japan but now wanted out, would be allowed to rejoin UWF and bring two of his disciples, Masakatsu Funaki and Minoru Suzuki, with him. That year also saw the debut of Kiyoshi Tamura, who is still recognized as one of the eminent shoot-style pro-wrestlers in Japan.

In 1989 UWF promoted its largest event yet, U-COSMOS, at the Tokyo Dome on November 29. The event drew an announced attendance of 60,000 spectators, making it the most-attended professional wrestling event in Japan during the 1980s and the first professional wrestling event to sell out the newly opened Tokyo Dome. U-COSMOS was built around the concept of "異種格闘技戦" (ishū kakutōgi-sen), or "interstyle combat matches", in which UWF wrestlers faced established competitors from other martial arts, harkening back to Anotnio Inoki's own exploits in interstyle matches, including his famous match against Muhammad Ali. Six of the event's seven matches followed this format, with UWF wrestlers facing opponents from Muay Thai, kickboxing, sambo, freestyle wrestling, and judo. Yoji Anjo fought Muay Thai champion Changpuek Kiatsongrit to a five-round draw, while future Pancrase co-founder Minoru Suzuki was knocked out by American kickboxer and future UFC Heavyweight Champion Maurice Smith in the fourth round. Yoshiaki Fujiwara defeated Dutch kickboxer Dick Vrij by an Achilles tendon hold, while sambo practitioner Chris Dolman defeated Kazuo Yamazaki by armbar. Nobuhiko Takada defeated American freestyle wrestler Duane Koslowski by armbar, and in the main event Akira Maeda defeated Dutch judoka Willie Wilhelm, an Olympic bronze medalist and European champion, by a knee-bar in the second round.

1990 saw many ups and downs in the short story of Newborn UWF. Future stars Masahito Kakihara and Yusuke Fuke debuted, and a new rulebook was devised in which the first person to score 5 knockdowns (in which the opponent could not get back up at once, similar to boxing knockout attempts) would win, giving the 5-knockdown situation the same weight as a submission. Shinji Jin, a non-wrestler who had taken over for Maeda as promotion president the previous year, wanted to co-promote with other federations and styles, particularly SWS and Hamada's Universal Lucha Libre, but Maeda, resenting other forms of professional wrestling from his New Japan days, decided to put the idea off. This, and the general Japanese economic downturn of the era, prompted Newborn UWF to close its doors with a farewell card on December 1, 1990, in Matsumoto, Nagano.

The UWF wrestlers thus went their separate ways. Most of the roster (Takada, Yamazaki, Anjo, Nakano, Tamura, Kakihara, and Shigeo Miyato) founded UWF International, while Fujiwara, Funaki, Suzuki and Fuke founded Fujiwara Gumi, which made Jin's co-promoting idea into reality. As for Maeda, he, some rookies from the former UWF dojo, and foreign fighters Chris Dolman and Dick Vrij founded Fighting Network RINGS, which would dedicate itself to pure shoot-style wrestling, and later to legitimate mixed martial arts, without actually billing itself as wrestling.

=== Alumni ===
- Natives: Akira Maeda, Kazuo Yamazaki, Kiyoshi Tamura, Makoto Oe, Masahito Kakihara, Masakatsu Funaki, Minoru Suzuki, Nobuhiko Takada, Shigeo Miyato, Tatsuo Nakano, Tsunehito Naito, Yoji Anjo, Yoshiaki Fujiwara, Yusuke Fuke
- Foreigners: Bart Vale, Bob Backlund, Changpuek Kiatsongrit, Chris Dolman, Dick Vrij, Maurice Smith, Norman Smiley, Wayne Shamrock

== Legacy ==
The UWF was a pioneer. Although its roots were Antonio Inoki's wrestling style (in fact, Maeda, Sayama and Takada credit Inoki as their inspiration to become wrestlers), UWF made wrestling realistic and forced other promotions to follow. In fact, All Japan starting in 1989 abandoned countout and disqualification finishes, which enabled its Triple Crown championship to arise.

The UWF's wrestling style has made inroads in its root promotion, New Japan, where natives Yuji Nagata, Koji Kanemoto, and Katsuyori Shibata use UWF-style kicks despite having never competed in a shoot-style promotion as their peers Minoru Tanaka, Masayuki Naruse, and Masahito Kakihara (who all joined New Japan in the early 2000s) have. Other natives who turned to martial arts fighting such as Tadao Yasuda, Kazuyuki Fujita and Kendo Ka Shin also have UWF inspiration. Above all, however, UWF made it possible for mixed-martial arts circuits to exist and be viable.

In Japan, a professional wrestling and/or mixed martial arts organizations that derived from the idea of UWF are collectively referred to "UWF-kei", or "U-kei" for short.

== See also ==
- Professional wrestling in Japan
