= Yoshiaki Fujiwara =

Japanese professional wrestler

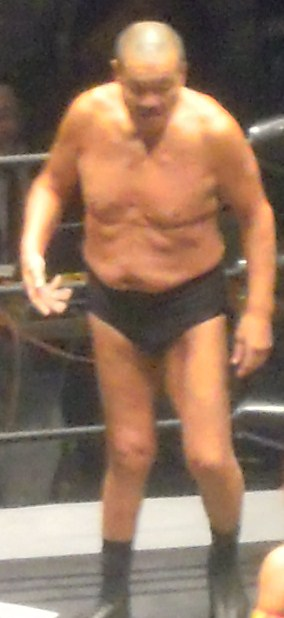
- Fujiwara in 2012

Personal information
- Born: April 27, 1949 (age 77)

Professional wrestling career
- Ring name: Yoshiaki Fujiwara
- Billed height: 1.85 m (6 ft 1 in)
- Billed weight: 102 kg (225 lb)
- Debut: November 12, 1972

Yoshiaki Fujiwara (藤原 喜明, Fujiwara Yoshiaki; April 27, 1949) is a Japanese professional wrestler, trainer and wrestling promoter. He is famous for his long career in wrestling, having worked in New Japan Pro-Wrestling (NJPW), Pro Wrestling ZERO-ONE (ZERO-ONE), and the two incarnations of shoot style promotion Universal Wrestling Federation. Fujiwara is known for his catch wrestling expertise, having been praised by fighters like Josh Barnett and Ken Shamrock. He was trained by Karl Gotch and has trained many MMA fighters and professional wrestlers. Fujiwara also has a strong background in Judo and Muay Thai.

== Professional wrestling career ==
=== New Japan Pro-Wrestling and Universal Wrestling Federation (1972–1989) ===
Fujiwara was the first graduate of the New Japan Pro-Wrestling (NJPW) dojo (Mr. Pogo was the first debutante in the promotion, but he and Gran Hamada had trained with Tatsumi Fujinami before he and Antonio Inoki left the Japanese Wrestling Association). A former Judoka, Fujiwara was easily able to absorb and apply the "Strong Style" of professional wrestling taught by Inoki and Karl Gotch, and he eventually became Inoki's bodyguard and sparring partner. In 1975, Fujiwara won the Karl Gotch Cup (a tournament for rookies named after Karl Gotch and forerunner to the later Young Lion Cup). In the late 1970s, Fujiwara became embroiled in a feud with Allen Coage (a former Olympic judo bronze medal winner who had debuted as a pro wrestler in NJPW, and one of the first gaijins to be trained at the NJPW dojo) over the petty issue of who had the strongest head. Fujiwara would bang his head repeatedly against the ring's corner post's metal face to provoke Coage, and behind the scenes, Coage would advise him not to do so repeatedly, in fear of suffering permanent real-life damage.

All the while, Fujiwara remained a strong member of the undercard, but rarely would he get opportunities for big singles matches or tag teams with better-known stars. On February 2, 1984, however, all that would change when Fujiwara appeared before a match to attack Riki Choshu, then the promotion's main villain. The sight of Choshu beaten and bleeding turned Fujiwara into one of the most popular babyface wrestlers in the promotion and a mainstay in the rivalry against Choshu and his Ishin Gundan faction. In storyline, it was suspected Inoki himself had arranged for Fujiwara's attack. The same year, Fujiwara was among the defectors who created the Japanese UWF.

When he and most of them returned in 1986, they formed their own stable, indicating they would battle major New Japan wrestlers and receive recognition on their own terms. As a member of the UWF stable, Fujiwara, along with Akira Maeda, focused on Inoki's IWGP Heavyweight Championship, pushing him to the limit in the annual IWGP tournaments. But at heart, Maeda and Fujiwara were also rivals - when unable to get the IWGP title, Maeda and Nobuhiko Takada went for and won the IWGP tag team title, Fujiwara and Kazuo Yamazaki split from the main UWF stable, and feuded with them over the title, eventually winning it. This split, also in the wake of Riki Choshu's return to NJPW after leaving in circumstances similar to Maeda and the rest of the UWF roster, eventually weakened the UWF stable.

When Maeda was fired from New Japan for a shoot attack on Choshu during a match in late 1987, all the other UWF stable members except for Fujiwara and Osamu Kido left NJPW to reform the UWF. Kido and Fujiwara attempted to get back into the good graces of the rest of the NJPW roster - and for a time, Fujiwara seemed to go back into the NJPW undercard, although with more respect from his peers. Inoki had already gained respect for him enough to be his tag team partner in 1986 for the annual tag team tournament (despite being affiliated with the UWF stable). In the meantime, Fujiwara trained rookies Masakatsu Funaki and Minoru Suzuki. In 1989, however, Fujiwara felt the need to continue shoot-style wrestling, also due to the rise of Choshu in backstage politics, so he moved to the UWF with Funaki and Suzuki.

=== Newborn UWF, Pro Wrestling Fujiwara Gumi, and Freelance (1989–present) ===
In Newborn UWF, Fujiwara was clearly seen as the senior peer to Maeda, but eventually jobbed to him. After Newborn UWF collapsed in December 1990, Fujiwara, Funaki, Suzuki and rookie Yusuke Fuke formed Pro Wrestling Fujiwara Gumi (Gumi [組] in Japanese means "group", but it is used in the underworld lingo to mean organized crime family. Fujiwara styled himself kumichō [組長], literally, the gang leader). Although it was a shoot style promotion, Fujiwara had agreements with SWS, W*ING and Universal Lucha Libre, whereupon he would send talent to compete in them (but not vice versa, in order to keep the shoot-style feel to his promotion). Fujiwara Gumi had a big supercard at the Tokyo Dome in 1992, involving all the great talents in the promotion: Fujiwara, Funaki, Suzuki, Fuke, Yoshiki Takahashi, Yuki Ishikawa, and others.

Problems involving the collapsing Japanese economy and the essence of Fujiwara Gumi's wrestling, however, forced its roster to assess their individual futures. Funaki, Suzuki, Fuke and Takahashi, apparently unsettled by the "performing" direction Fujiwara was taking, abandoned him in late 1993 to form Pancrase. Fujiwara already had back-up talent - Ishikawa, Daisuke Ikeda, Katsumi Usuda, Minoru Tanaka, Mamoru Okamoto, Muhammad Yone, and Shoichi Funaki. In need of funds, however, Fujiwara proposed to cooperate with their root promotion, New Japan. Fujiwara and the rest of the roster began having a small feud with NJPW, Fujiwara challenging the heavyweights (he challenged future partner Shinya Hashimoto for the IWGP title, but failed again), and the rest the junior heavyweight division. The NJPW-PWFG feud, however, did not have the star-studded impression on fans that the NJPW-UWFI feud later had.

In late 1995, Ishikawa and the rest of the Fujiwara Gumi roster abandoned Fujiwara and formed their own promotion, BattlARTS, citing problems with Fujiwara's management team. Since 1996, Fujiwara, the only remaining member of Fujiwara Gumi and thus a free agent (as the promotion no longer operates), has competed in several promotions, mostly in legends matches. He has wrestled for NJPW, All Japan Pro Wrestling, Pro Wrestling ZERO-ONE, WAR, and several independents as of 2025.

== Personal life ==
Fujiwara is also an actor who has had a few parts in Japanese movies and dramas. In 1995, he had a major role in the Toshihiro Sato movie Roppongi Soldier along with Satoru Sayama and Itsumi Osawa, playing an eccentric kickboxer named Sabu.

He is also a prolific artisan potter.

== Championships and accomplishments ==
- Dramatic Dream Team
  - Ironman Heavymetalweight Championship (1 time)
- Frontier Martial-Arts Wrestling
  - FMW Brass Knuckles Tag Team Championship (1 time) – with Daisuke Ikeda
- New Japan Pro-Wrestling
  - IWGP Tag Team Championship (1 time) – with Kazuo Yamazaki
  - NJPW Japan Cup Tag League (1986) – with Antonio Inoki
  - NJPW Karl Gotch Cup (1975)
- Pro Wrestling Fujiwara Gumi
  - Fujiwara Gumi Heavyweight Championship (1 time)
- Pro Wrestling ZERO1
  - NWA Intercontinental Tag Team Championship (1 time) – with Shinya Hashimoto
- Tokyo Sports
  - Effort Award (1975, 1982)
  - Fighting Spirit Award (1987)
  - Technique Award (1989)
- Universal Wrestling Federation
  - Kakuto Prospect Tournament (1985)

== Filmography ==
Year	Title	Role
1978	The Bad News Bears Go to Japan	Wrestler
1995	Toryu-den	Trainer
1995	Roppongi Soldier	Sabu
1995	Zero Woman: The Hunted	Yamamoto
1999	Gohatto	Samurai
1999	A! Ikkenya Puroresu	Kota's friend
2005	Koshu Prison	Inmate
2005	Muhito	Wrestler
2005	Yakuza (video game)	Florist of Sai
2006	Yakuza 2 (video game)	Florist of Sai
2008	Ryū ga Gotoku Kenzan! (video game)	Hon'ami Koetsu
2009	Yakuza 3 (video game)	Florist of Sai
2010	Yakuza 4 (video game)	Florist of Sai
2010	Kurohyō: Ryū ga Gotoku Shinshō (video game)	Florist of Sai
2011	Yakuza: Dead Souls (video game)	Florist of Sai
2012	Yakuza 5 (video game)	Florist of Sai
2012	Kurohyō: Ryū ga Gotoku Ashura-hen (video game)	Florist of Sai
2014	Ryū ga Gotoku Ishin! (video game)	Bathkeeper of Sai
2016	Yakuza Kiwami (video game)	Florist of Sai
2017	Yakuza Kiwami 2 (video game)	Florist of Sai
2023	Like a Dragon: Ishin! (video game)	Bathkeeper of Sai
