= Shoot wrestling =

Style of wrestling

- Focus: Grappling
- Country of origin: Japan
- Famous practitioners: Satoru Sayama, Yuki Nakai, Yorinaga Nakamura, Kazuo Yamazaki, Kazushi Sakuraba, Kiyoshi Tamura, Tsuyoshi Kosaka, Volk Han, Ken Shamrock, Masakatsu Funaki, Frank Shamrock, Daisuke Nakamura
- Parenthood: Catch wrestling, freestyle wrestling, Greco-Roman wrestling, judo, karate, Muay Thai, sambo
- Descendant arts: Shootfighting, Shooto, shootboxing, mixed martial arts, Submission Arts Wrestling (SAW), Combat Submission Wrestling (via Shooto)
- Olympic sport: No

Shoot wrestling or shoot-style is a style of Japanese professional wrestling that emphasizes realistic and combat-oriented techniques and presentation, incorporating techniques from various wrestling, submission grappling, and kickboxing styles. The term "Shoot Wrestling" has also been used more broadly for fighting systems derived from or influenced by shoot-style wrestling. The techniques developed in shoot-style wrestling were later adapted into legitimate combat sports, contributing to the development of systems such as Shooto and shootfighting, and influencing early Japanese mixed martial arts (MMA).

Professional wrestlers of this scene increasingly incorporated more realistic or "full-contact" techniques into their matches to heighten their intensity, while diminishing or eschewing some of the theatrical elements and acrobatics of mainstream professional wrestling. The style incorporated techniques from martial arts and combat sports such as catch-as-catch-can wrestling, judo, karate, kickboxing, and other forms of grappling and striking. Matches emphasized hard-looking strikes and kicks, takedowns, suplexes, realistic grappling exchanges, and submission holds, with wrestlers seeking to make predetermined contests resemble legitimate fights through struggles for position, exchanges of strikes, and attempts to force opponents to submit or be knocked out. This emphasis on realism extended to the presentation and structure of matches, presenting some traditional wrestling conventions, such as gimmicks and heel-and-face dynamics, in a more subdued form, with wrestlers commonly wearing simple trunks, singlets, or other combat sports-inspired athletic attire rather than elaborate, colorful costumes, while incorporating elements of legitimate combat sports into their rules and presentation, including rounds, point systems, and kayfabe judges and officials; some also eliminated the three-count pinfall in favor of submission, knockout, or point-based finishes to provide clearer conclusions to matches. The name "shoot wrestling" comes from the professional wrestling term "shoot", which refers to any unscripted occurrence within a scripted wrestling event.

The first wave of shoot wrestlers were students of Antonio Inoki and Karl Gotch from New Japan Pro-Wrestling (NJPW), two wrestlers which already were advocates of a stiffer and more realistic wrestling style, and influenced by wrestlers such as Lou Thesz and Billy Robinson, all who had an enduring popularity in Japan due to their serious submission wrestling style, which became known as "Strong-style". Their students left NJPW to form the Universal Wrestling Federation (UWF) in 1984, which developed and codified shoot-style wrestling into a distinct form. After the UWF closed in 1990, its wrestlers went on to establish or join several successor promotions, including Pro Wrestling Fujiwara Gumi, Fighting Network RINGS, and UWF International (UWFi), the latter becoming the most popular and commercially successful of the UWF successors. These promotions helped popularize shoot-style wrestling, which reached its peak popularity in the late 1980s and mid-1990s when UWF-derived promotions drew tens of thousands of spectators, including reported crowds of 60,000 at the 1989 U-Cosmos event and 67,000 at a joint NJPW–UWFi event in 1995.

Shoot wrestling was popular in Japan from the 1980s until the mid-1990s, when its popularity declined sharply amid the demise of the leading shoot-style promotion UWFi in 1996 and the simultaneous rise of mixed martial arts (MMA) in Japan. The decline was particularly notable for its speed: within a few years, many of the wrestlers and organizations that had helped popularize shoot wrestling had transitioned to legitimate MMA, while others returned to more theatrical forms of professional wrestling. Shoot-style wrestling nevertheless survived in smaller independent promotions, such as BattlARTS and Lidet UWF, which continues to present UWF-style matches. Shoot wrestling had a considerable influence on the sport of mixed martial arts.

Prior to the emergence of the current sport of shoot wrestling, the term was commonly used in the professional wrestling business, particularly in the United Kingdom, as a synonym for the sport of catch wrestling. Shoot wrestling can be used to describe a range of hybrid fighting systems such as shootfighting, shoot boxing and the styles of mixed martial arts done in the Shooto, Pancrase and RINGS promotions. Organizations, promotions and gyms with origins in shoot wrestling are referred as the "U-Kei".

== History ==
Historically, shoot wrestling has been influenced by many martial arts, most influential of them being catch wrestling, but also freestyle wrestling, Greco-Roman wrestling, and then sambo, karate, Muay Thai and judo in the sport's later stages.

Karl Gotch is one of the most important figures in the development of shoot wrestling. Gotch would begin his journey in amateur wrestling, competing at the 1948 Olympic Games representing Belgium. He evntually moved into the German and North American professional wrestling circuits, where Gotch found moderate success. Gotch was also a student of the "Snake Pit" gym, run by the renowned catch wrestler Billy Riley in Wigan. The gym was the centre of learning submission wrestling as practiced in the mining town of Wigan, popularly known as catch-as-catch-can wrestling. It was here that Karl Gotch honed his catch wrestling skills. Karl Gotch also travelled to India to practice the wrestling form of Pehlwani; later on he would propagate the exercises using the "Hindu mace" and would go on to incorporate the Indian system of exercises using push-ups, neck exercises, yogic breathing exercises and Hindu squats for conditioning. While a talented wrestler, his serious, sports-based grappling style was getting outdated in an industry that increasingly valued showmanship and theatrics over legimitate wrestling. He instead went to Japan, where his style was more accepted and made him popular in the Japanese public, attaining him legendary status in Japan ans earning the nickname of "God of Wrestling". In the 1970s he taught catch wrestling-based hooking and shooting to the likes of Antonio Inoki, Tatsumi Fujinami, Yoshiaki Fujiwara, Satoru Sayama, Masami Soranaka, and Akira Maeda. Most of these professional wrestlers already had backgrounds in legitimate martial arts. Masami Soranaka had been a student of full contact karate, kodokan judo, and sumo. Yoshiaki Fujiwara was already a black belt in judo, while Satoru Sayama had studied Muay Thai with Toshio Fujiwara and went on to study sambo with Victor Koga. This would eventually lead to the added influences of karate, Muay Thai and judo to the wrestling style.

One of Gotch's students, Antonio Inoki, hosted a series of mixed martial arts-style wrestling matches in which he pitted his "strong-style professional wrestling" against other martial arts, such as karate, kickboxing, judo and sumo in an attempt to show that professional wrestling was the strongest fighting discipline, these were known as "heterogeneous combat sports bouts" (Ishu Kakutōgi Sen; 異種格闘技戦). These matches eventually culminated into the Muhammad Ali vs. Antonio Inoki. While the previous matches were predetermined, Ali and Inoki could not agree on the terms of the match and it turned into a "shoot". Inoki would go on to teach these fighting techniques to a new generation of wrestlers in the dojo of his professional wrestling promotion, New Japan Pro-Wrestling.

Later on, many wrestlers became interested in promoting this more realistic style of professional wrestling and in 1984, the Universal Wrestling Federation was formed. The UWF was initially more traditional in its presentation, featuring conventional professional wrestling matches, acrobatic maneuvers such as top-rope jumps, Satoru Sayama continued to performing under his Tiger Mask persona, and even having high-flying lucha libre matches. As the promotion developed, its wrestlers increasingly incorporated the legitimate martial arts techniques they had learned into their matches and presentations. This gradual evolution eventually led the UWF toward the more realistic, shoot-style approach for which it became known. However, internal conflicts between the wrestlers and financial issues soon resulted in a breakup of the company in 1985. Most wrestlers returned to NJPW, where they were part of an "invasion" angle in which the returning UWF wrestlers were presented as a rival faction challenging New Japan's established wrestlers. But soon, the UWF wrestlers left NJPW again and in 1988 they revived the promotion as the "Newborn UWF" (新生UWF). Led by Akira Maeda, the Newborn UWF expanded and refined the realistic, shoot-style approach that had emerged during the original UWF's existence, placing greater emphasis on realistic strikes, submission holds, and competitive-looking matches. In this sense, shoot wrestling harkened back to the older tradition of professional wrestling, particularly catch-as-catch-can wrestling, with its emphasis on technical grappling, submission holds, and realistic competition. However, shoot-style also incorporated techniques from modern martial arts, creating a distinctly Japanese hybrid of professional wrestling and legitimate combat sports. Ultimately, just like the original incarnation, internal disagreements and disputes over the promotion's finances and management eventually led to its dissolution in 1991.

Inspired by Antonio Inoki's "heterogeneous combat sports bouts", UWF and its many successors often staged matches between professional wrestlers and practitioners of other martial arts and combat sports. These bouts pitted wrestlers against opponents trained in disciplines such as karate, judo, kickboxing, and other fighting styles, with the matches often presented as contests between different combat sports. This format became a recurring feature of shoot-style wrestling and helped establish the idea of professional wrestlers testing themselves against fighters from outside professional wrestling. This approach was prominently showcased at the Newborn UWF's U-COSMOS event at the Tokyo Dome on November 29, 1989, which drew more than 60,000 spectators. Every match except one featured a UWF pro wrestler competing against a fighter from another discipline, including Muay Thai, kickboxing, sambo, freestyle wrestling, and judo. Among the bouts was Minoru Suzuki, future founder of Pancrase against American kickboxer Maurice Smith, future UFC Heavyweight Champion, while the main event saw Akira Maeda face Dutch judoka Willy Wilhelm, an Olympic bronze medalist and European judo champion.

After the breakup of the Newborn Universal Wrestling Federation, shoot wrestling branched into several disciplines. One of the first top stars to leave was "Tiger Mask" Satoru Sayama in 1985, he was dissatisfied with the UWF's internal politics and decided to follow his dream of founding his own martial art discipline. He combined his knowledge of shoot wrestling and other martial arts to create a legitimate fighting style which he later named "Shooto", holding the first amateur event in 1986 and first professional event in 1989. Other wrestlers took the UWF's ideas in different directions. Nobuhiko Takada and his supporters went to found UWF International, which retained shoot wrestling's realistic fighting style but placed greater emphasis on the presentation and spectacle of professional wrestling. In contrast, Akira Maeda founded Fighting Network RINGS, which initially distinguished itself by bringing in foreign martial artists and placing greater emphasis on authentic fighting backgrounds. While Yoshiaki Fujiwara went to found Pro Wrestling Fujiwara Gumi ("Fujiwara family"), which focused more heavily on technical and catch wrestling skills while remaining a professional wrestling promotion. On the latter, a few wrestlers such as Masakatsu Funaki and Minoru Suzuki, dissatisfied with Fujiwara's turn to lucha libre-inspired style and lack of focus in fighting skills, founded Pancrase in 1993, which adopted shoot wrestling techniques and rules but replaced worked matches with real, unscripted fights.

The multiple successors and organizations inspired by the UWF range from professional wrestling, to MMA and even standalone martial arts styles, they are collectively known as the "U-Kei" ("U-Group" or "U-Class").

At its peak, the UWF movement had a substantial following in Japan, with its various promotions drawing audiences in the tens of thousands. The Newborn UWF's 1989 U-Cosmos event at the Tokyo Dome drew a reported 60,000 spectators, while the UWFi's 1995 crossover event with New Japan Pro-Wrestling drew a reported 67,000 (The NJPW–UWFi interpromotional feud of 1995 has also been cited as an influence on Eric Bischoff for the creation of the New World Order storyline in WCW). However, the same movement that popularized shoot-style wrestling also helped create the foundation for the emerging sport of mixed martial arts, and by the late 1990s the appeal of legitimate combat had increasingly shifted away from worked shoot wrestling. The contrast became particularly apparent in 1997: Kingdom Professional Wrestling, the direct successor to UWFi, struggled to attract audiences, while the inaugural PRIDE Fighting Championships event, held at the Tokyo Dome in October, drew 47,860 spectators for the legitimate MMA bout between Rickson Gracie and UWFi ace Nobuhiko Takada. Kingdom folded the following year, while PRIDE went on to become one of the world's leading MMA promotions. Most shoot wrestlers started to migrate into MMA—Fighting Network RINGS itself became a full MMA promotion—or back to more theatrical forms of professional wrestling.

Shoot-style wrestling did not disappear entirely following the decline of the major UWF-derived promotions, but it largely ceased to be a mainstream form of professional wrestling in Japan. During the late 1990s and 2000s, the style continued primarily in smaller independent promotions, such as BattlARTS (1996–2011) and U-Style (2003–2005). U-Style's final major event, U-Style Axis, was held at Ariake Coliseum in November 2005 and drew 3,962 spectators. Co-produced with Dream Stage Entertainment, the company behind PRIDE, the event featured Kiyoshi Tamura defeating former UFC Heavyweight Champion and King of Pancrase Josh Barnett in the main event.

In 2004, shoot wrestling received official sport status in western Canada and was eligible for licensing. The first of many matches were held open to the public to build a foundation of awareness for the new sport. Gyms like the Lion's Den, Takada Dojo, and the Shamrock Martial Arts Academy propagated the shoot wrestling-based style around the world. Junior National Korean taekwondo champion Masa Kin Jim has trained in shoot wrestling. During a brief tour of Japan promoting Korean Martial Arts, Masa Kin Jim became fascinated with the shoot wrestling style. In 1998, he would go on to open one of the first shoot wrestling academies in South Korea.

Currently, a few companies have been promoting shoot-wrestling events. GLEAT is a Japanese promotion founded in 2020 by LIDET Entertainment consists of former Pro Wrestling NOAH officials. The "Lidet UWF" is a sub-brand which has UWF-style matches. Game Changer Wrestling—an American New Jersey–based promotion—promotes shoot-style wrestling events known as the GCW Bloodsport. The events counted with former MMA and shoot-inspired pro wrestlers such as Minoru Suzuki, Josh Barnett, Matt Riddle and Dan Severn.

== Major promotions ==
Shoot wrestling branched into several sub disciplines after the breakup of the original Universal Wrestling Federation. The main forms and revivals are listed below.

- Shooto was the first to spin off from the UWF. Founded by Satoru Sayama in 1985 who wanted to use shoot-style wrestling in a practical form, creating an hybrid martial art and an organization to promote it.
- UWF International was founded in 1991 by Nobuhiko Takada. Of the major UWF offshoots, UWFi placed relatively greater emphasis on the dramatic presentation of professional wrestling together with the realistic combat of shoot style.
- Fighting Network Rings was founded in 1991 by Akira Maeda. It differentiated from the other UWF offshoors by frequently featured competitors with backgrounds in legitimate martial arts and international competitors. It gradually transitioned into a genuine mixed martial arts organization, becoming an important precursor to modern MMA.
- Pro Wrestling Fujiwara Gumi (PWFG) was founded in 1991 by Yoshiaki Fujiwara. Its style emphasized catch wrestling, submission holds, joint locks, and technical grappling, reflecting Fujiwara's background and training under Karl Gotch.
- Universal Lucha Libre was founded by Gran Hamada in 1990. Unlike the other UWF offshoots, it moved away from shoot-style wrestling and focused on lucha libre, incorporating high-flying maneuvers, rapid sequences, and traditional Mexican wrestling techniques.
- Pancrase was founded in 1993 by Fujiwara's students Masakatsu Funaki and Minoru Suzuki. Inspired by shoot wrestling, it adapted many of its techniques into a competitive combat sport featuring real, unscripted fights. Pancrase became one of the earliest major mixed martial arts organizations, predating the establishment of the Ultimate Fighting Championship (UFC).
- Shoot boxing was founded by kickboxer Caesar Takeshi in 1985. Although it was not a direct offshoot of the UWF, it shared the broader interest in realistic combat and incorporated elements of kickboxing, standing submissions, and throws. It developed as a distinct stand-up combat sport rather than a form of professional wrestling.
- Frontier Martial-Arts Wrestling (FMW) was founded in 1989 by Atsushi Onita. Although it initially incorporated shoot-style wrestling and martial arts-inspired competition, FMW gradually moved away from this approach to focus on hardcore wrestling and deathmatches. The promotion became renowned for its violent matches involving barbed wire, explosives, and other dangerous stipulations, developing a distinct identity separate from the more technically oriented UWF offshoots.
- Battlarts was founded by Yuki Ishikawa in 1996 following the decline of PWFG. Although rooted in shoot-style wrestling and catch wrestling, it developed a distinctive battibatti style characterized by stiff strikes, intense grappling exchanges, and a blend of realistic combat techniques with conventional professional wrestling, thus, rather than strictly preserving the original UWF format, Battlarts developed a more hybrid approach to shoot wrestling.
- Kingdom was founded in 1997 by former UWFi wrestlers, including Kiyoshi Tamura. It continued the tradition of realistic, combat-oriented professional wrestling while incorporating techniques associated with submission grappling and mixed martial arts. The promotion was short-lived but represented a continuation of the UWFi style after its closure.
- U-Style was founded by Kiyoshi Tamura in 2003, following the end of Fighting Network RINGS' original run and the closure of Kingdom. It revived a particularly austere form of shoot-style wrestling, emphasizing submission grappling, strikes, and realistic combat without many of the theatrical conventions of mainstream professional wrestling. Centered on Tamura and his U-File Camp, the promotion sought to continue the UWF tradition while adapting it to an era increasingly dominated by legitimate mixed martial arts.
- Lidet UWF: one of the three sub-brands of GLEAT, created in 2021, it features UWF-inspired professional wrestling matches. Under the guidance of former UWF and UWFi wrestler Kiyoshi Tamura, it seeks to revive and preserve the shoot-style tradition. Unlike earlier UWF offshoots, LIDET UWF operates within a larger promotion (GLEAT) that also features conventional professional wrestling and mixed martial arts.

== Derived styles ==
=== Shooto ===
Professional wrestler Satoru Sayama, a student of Antonio Inoki, founded Shooto in 1985 with the goal creating a sport that revolved around a realistic and effective fighting system. Shooto is focused on all aspects of fighting: striking, stand-up grappling and ground fighting. Practitioners are referred to as shooters or shootists.

=== Shootfighting ===
An early term for MMA, based on the pro wrestling term "shoot" to denote that the fighting is not staged. In the west, the name became associated to Bart Vale, a Fujiwara Gumi wrestler who used the skills he learned in shoot-style wrestling to create his own martial art. It encompasses striking and grappling like MMA, however has slightly different rules to MMA, including rope breaks.

=== Shoot boxing ===
Kickboxer Caesar Takeshi founded Shoot boxing in 1985, a stand-up fighting league allowing standing submissions and throws.

=== Submission Arts Wrestling (SAW) ===
Wrestling and Sambo Champion, Shihan Hidetaka Aso, founded this style of grappling in 1980s, combining the elements of shoot-style wrestling, Catch wrestling, Judo, Sumo, Sambo, Karate, Muay Thai, and Wrestling.

=== Combat Submission Wrestling ===
Erik Paulson, an American MMA fighter, created this style of Submission wrestling by combining Shooto with various other martial arts and combat sports.

== See also ==
- Pancrase
- Professional wrestling in Japan
