= Yuki Ishikawa (wrestler, born 1967) =

Japanese professional wrestler, mixed martial artist and promoter

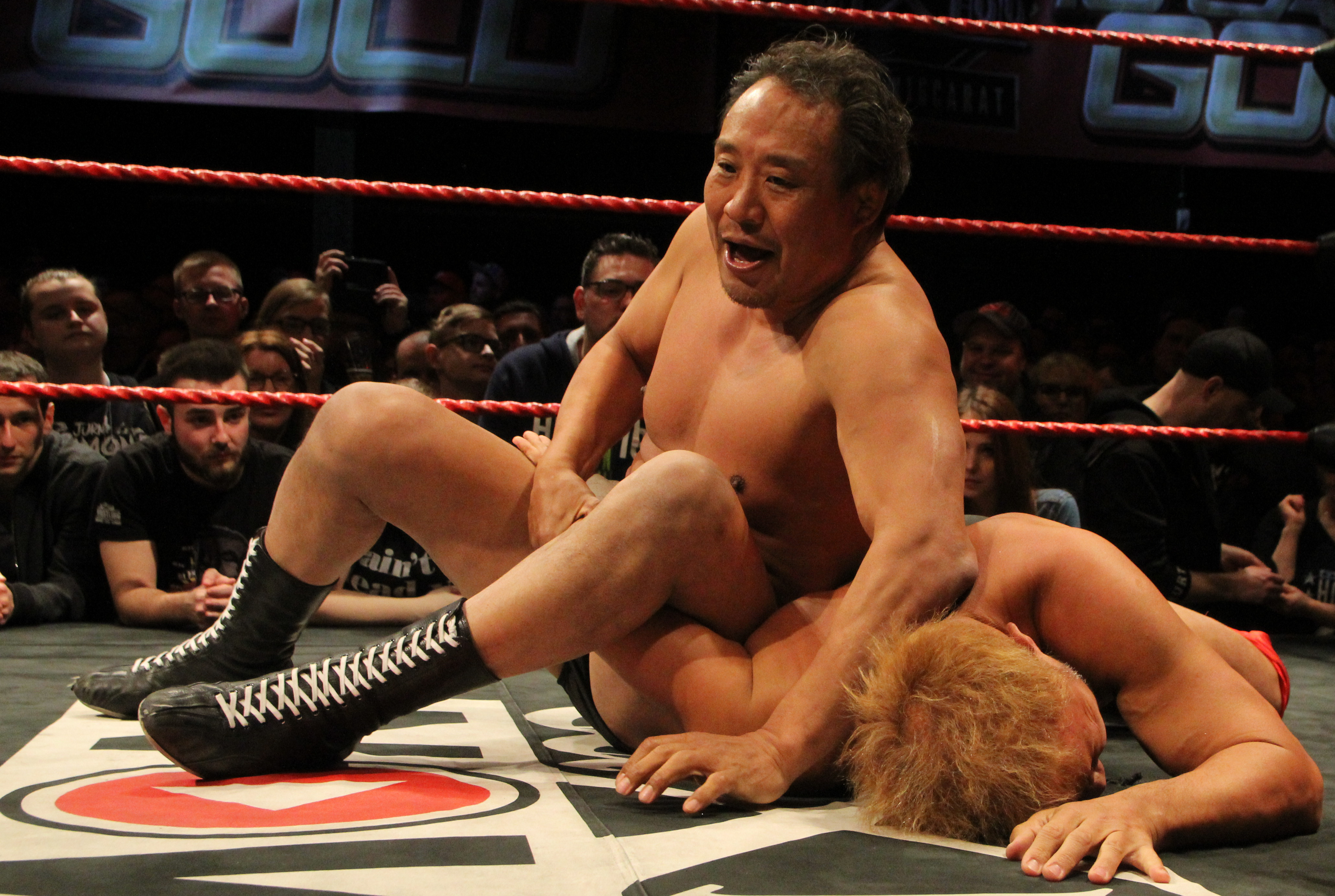
- Ishikawa in March 2020, at 16 Carat Gold, wrestling Daisuke Ikeda

Personal information
- Born: February 8, 1967 (age 59) Odawara, Kanagawa, Japan
- Education: Nihon University

Professional wrestling career
- Ring name(s): Great Sasuke Tiga; Yuki Ishikawa
- Billed height: 180 cm (5 ft 11 in)
- Billed weight: 95 kg (209 lb)
- Trained by: Yoshiaki Fujiwara; Karl Gotch; Boris Malenko
- Debut: April 19, 1992

Yuki Ishikawa (石川雄規, Ishikawa Yūki; born February 8, 1967) is a Japanese professional wrestler, former mixed martial artist and promoter. Beginning his career with shoot style promotion Pro Wrestling Fujiwara Gumi (PWFG), Ishikawa is known for his violent shoot style matches, that often include him and his opponents legitimately hitting each other and ending the match with numerous injuries and/or blood on their faces.

He is perhaps best known for his work in Battlarts, a promotion he founded in 1996. Ishikawa has also competed extensively on the Japanese independent circuit as a freelancer, competing for companies such as Pro Wrestling Zero1, All Japan Pro Wrestling (AJPW) and Inoki Genome Federation (IGF) as a freelancer. He has also competed in mixed martial arts for Fighting Network RINGS, Pride FC and Deep.

== Professional wrestling career ==
=== Pro Wrestling Fujiwara Gumi (1992–1995) ===
Ishikawa idolised Antonio Inoki as a child and dreamed of being a professional wrestler his entire life. After graduating from Nihon University, he travelled to the United States and enrolled in Boris Malenko's school of professional wrestling, where he trained under Malenko and Karl Gotch. After returning to Japan in 1991, Ishikawa joined Pro Wrestling Fujiwara Gumi and received further training from owner Yoshiaki Fujiwara. Ishikawa spent the early years of his career in both PWFG and New Japan Pro-Wrestling, where he took part in the 1995 Young Lions Cup but failed to win. On November 19, 1995, after discovering that the sponsors of Fujiwara Gumi planned to massively restructure the roster and change the landscape of the entire promotion, Ishikawa led an exodus which resulted in the entire roster except for Fujiwara himself leaving the promotion.

=== Battlarts (1996–2002) ===
After breaking away from PWFG, Ishikawa announced the formation of his own promotion, Battlarts, set to follow the same shoot style rules and themes of PWFG. As well as using the entirety of the former Fujiwara Gumi roster, Battlarts would make use of fellow independent promotions such as Frontier Martial Arts Wrestling (FMW), Michinoku Pro Wrestling and Big Japan Pro Wrestling (BJW). Battlarts quickly gained notoriety for its violent matches, often ending with Ishikawa either breaking his nose or having blood coming out of his mouth. In 1998, Ishikawa entered the Young Generation Battle, where he would go on to win the tournament by defeating Victor Krüger in the final. In November of the same year he also won the 1998 B Cup, beating Bob Backlund to win. He once again made it to the final of the Young Generation Battle in 1999, however this time he lost to his biggest rival Daisuke Ikeda. Ikeda eventually left Battlarts for All Japan Pro Wrestling (AJPW) in March 2000, and the promotion ceased running regular shows and events in 2001 due to "management aggravation". Battlarts eventually began to run monthly shows mainly in Tokyo, Saitama, and Shizuoka Prefecture, often co-promoting with other promotions such as Kiyoshi Tamura's Style-E and Satoru Sayama's Real Japan Pro Wrestling (RJPW).

=== Freelance (2002–present) ===
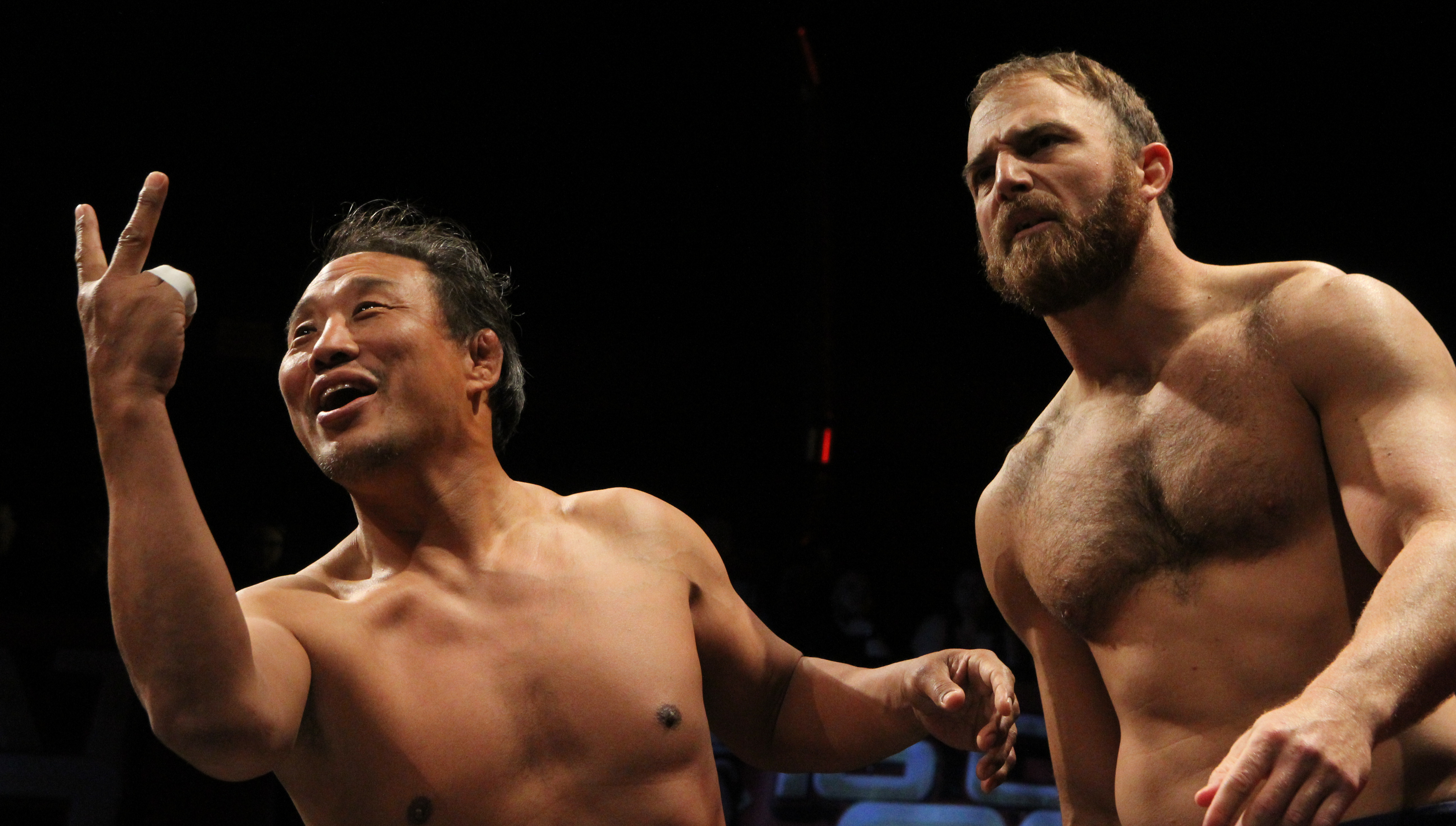
Ishikawa (left) in March 2020, at 16 Carat Gold, alongside Timothy Thatcher

As Battlarts ran shows less often, Ishikawa began competing for other promotions in early 2002, working for a number of promotions including Fighting World of Japan Pro Wrestling (WJ), Pro Wrestling Zero1, All Japan Pro Wrestling (AJPW), Riki-Pro and U-Style. On April 24, 2005, Ishikawa took part in an infamous match with Daisuke Ikeda in his Futen promotion, where the two willingly shot on each other, punching and kicking themselves for real. Ishikawa continued to compete semi-regularly for both Battlarts and Futen until they closed their doors in 2011 and 2013 respectively.

From 2015 to 2018 he made sporadic appearances in a tribute Battle Arts promotion based in Ontario, Canada and promoted by Santino Marella. He periodically showed up in All Japan Pro Wrestling and Pro Wrestling NOAH for legends matches.

He should not be confused with a Yuki Ishikawa who debuted in Big Japan Pro Wrestling in 2018 and who uses his real given name.

== Mixed martial arts career ==
With a background in judo, karate and catch wrestling, Ishikawa has also competed in mixed martial arts. Representing PWFG, he had an early shoot fight with Fighting Network RINGS against submission wrestler Koichiro Kimura on April 30, 1993, which he won via doctor's stoppage due an eye injury sustained by Kimura at the end of round 3. He then fought Masayuki Naruse to a draw at another RINGS event on May 29, 1993. He made his true MMA debut on November 3, 2001 at Pride 17, losing to Quinton Jackson by knockout. He would compete one more time at Deep 7th Impact, losing to Yasuhito Namekawa by submission.

=== Mixed martial arts record ===
Professional record breakdown
4 matches	1 win	2 losses
By knockout	1	1
By submission	0	1
By decision	0	0
Draws	1	

Res.	Record	Opponent	Method	Event	Date	Round	Time	Location	Notes
Loss	1–2–1	Yasuhito Namekawa	Submission (punches)	Deep 7th Impact	December 8, 2002	1	3:46	Tokyo, Japan	
Loss	1–1–1	Quinton Jackson	TKO	Pride 17	November 3, 2001	1	1:52	Tokyo, Japan	
Draw	1–0–1	Masayuki Naruse	Draw	RINGS: Battle Dimension 3	May 29, 1993	1	30:00	Tokyo, Japan	
Win	1–0	Koichiro Kimura	TKO (doctor stoppage)	RINGS: Korakuen Experimental League 1993 Round 2	April 30, 1993	3	15:00	Tokyo, Japan	

== Championships and accomplishments ==
- Fighting Investigation Team Battlearts
  - Tag Battle Tournament (1997)– with Carl Greco
  - Young Generation Battle (1998)
  - B-Cup (1998)
  - B-Rule Tournament (2001)
  - B-1 Climax (2009)
- Pro Wrestling Zero1
  - NWA Intercontinental Tag Team Championship (1 time) – with Shinjiro Otani
