= Masakatsu Funaki =

Japanese professional wrestler and mixed martial arts fighter (born 1969)

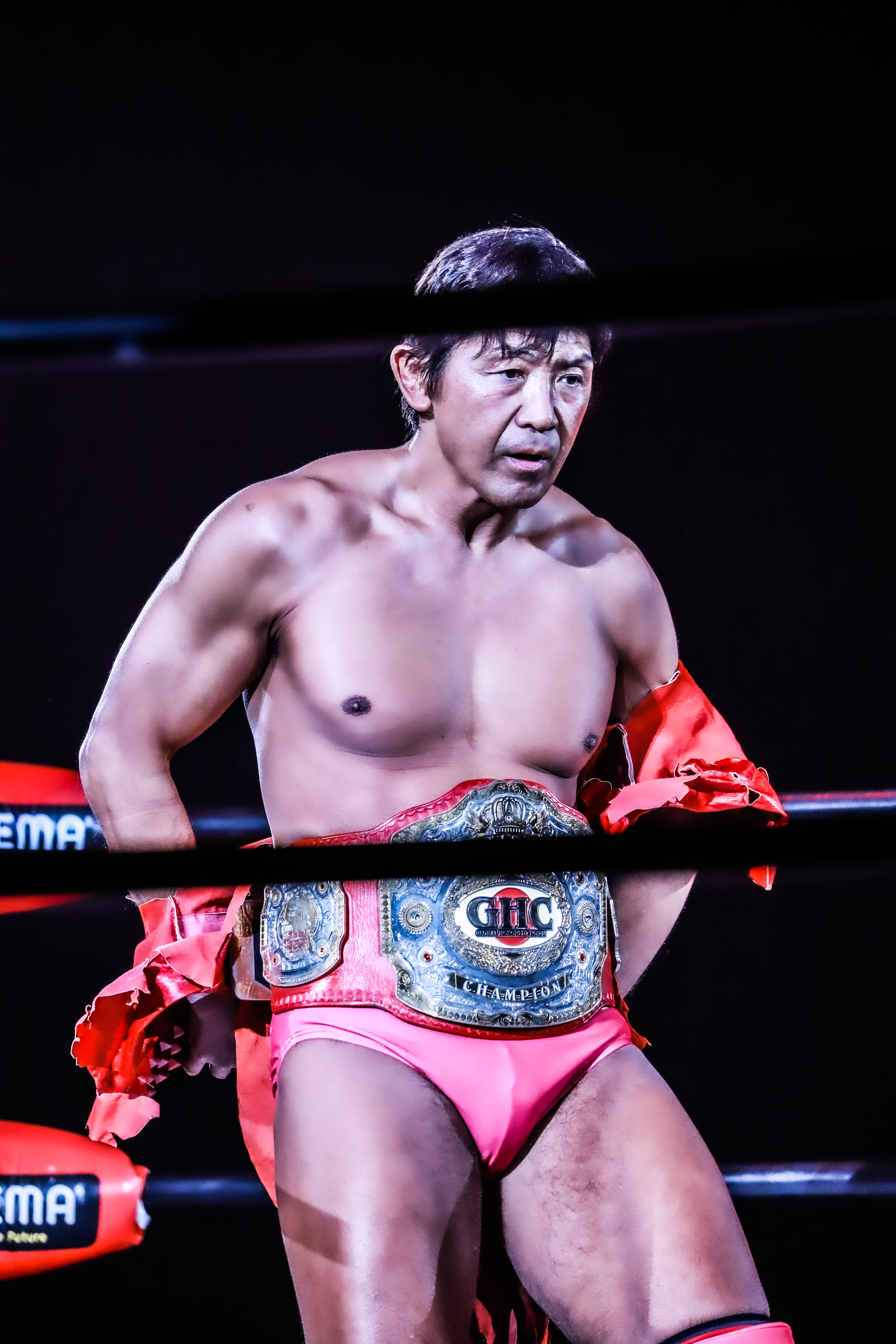
- Funaki as the GHC National Champion in October 2022
- Born: Masaharu Funaki (船木 優治, Funaki Masaharu); March 13, 1969 (age 57); Hirosaki, Aomori Prefecture, Japan
- Other names: Masaharu Funaki; The Last Samurai; Yomigaetta Samurai("Modern Day Samurai"); Hybrid Wrestler
- Height: 6 ft 0 in (1.83 m)
- Weight: 209 lb (95 kg; 14 st 13 lb)
- Division: Middleweight
- Style: Boxing, Catch Wrestling, Muay Thai, Koppo, Kendo, Shootfighting
- Teachers: Yoshiaki Fujiwara, Karl Gotch
- Years active: 1993–2000, 2007–2012 (MMA); 1985–1993, 2009–present (Professional wrestling)

Mixed martial arts record
- Total: 55
- Wins: 40
- By knockout: 5
- By submission: 34
- By decision: 1
- Losses: 13
- By knockout: 3
- By submission: 8
- By decision: 2
- Draws: 2

Other information
- Mixed martial arts record from Sherdog

Masaharu Funaki (Japanese: 船木 優治, Funaki Masaharu; born March 13, 1969) is a Japanese actor, mixed martial artist and professional wrestler known professionally as Masakatsu Funaki (船木 誠勝, Funaki Masakatsu), who has previously wrestled in All Japan Pro Wrestling (AJPW), New Japan Pro-Wrestling (NJPW), Pro Wrestling Fujiwara Gumi (PWFG), Newborn UWF (UWF), and Wrestle-1 (W-1). He is also the co-founder of Pancrase, one of the first mixed martial arts organizations and non-rehearsed shoot wrestling promotions (following five years after the inception of Shooto but predating America's Ultimate Fighting Championship). Funaki was also Pancrase's biggest star; Josh Barnett described him as the "symbol of Japan", Frank Shamrock labeled Funaki "the golden boy" of Pancrase, and Guy Mezger called Funaki "hands down the smartest and most skilled fighter in Pancrase next to Ken Shamrock".

Not only the organization's co-founder and most popular fighter, Funaki was also one of Pancrase's most successful fighters to date, scoring submission victories over numerous MMA champions such as Ken Shamrock, Frank Shamrock, Semmy Schilt, Guy Mezger, Yuki Kondo, Minoru Suzuki, and Bas Rutten through the course of his Pancrase career. He is the only fighter in mixed martial arts to hold wins over both Shamrock brothers and Bas Rutten, and was the first man to win the King of Pancrase title twice.

Funaki is widely considered to be one of the greatest Japanese fighters in mixed martial arts history. Sherdog.com ranked him as the #1 mixed martial artist in the world for the years 1996 and 1997, and also had him ranked as a top 4 pound for pound fighter from 1993 to 1998.

== Early life ==
The son of a movie theater owner, Masaharu Funaki was exposed to martial arts films at an early age. He idolized Bruce Lee above all others, but also eagerly watched the films of Sammo Hung and Sonny Chiba. His father would ultimately abandon young Funaki and his family.

== Professional wrestling career ==
=== New Japan Pro-Wrestling (1985–1989) ===
Instead of entering high school, he applied to New Japan Pro-Wrestling (NJPW), who sent him to the New Japan dojo. He was in the same class as Keiichi Yamada (better known as Jyushin Thunder Liger), Keiji Mutoh, Shinya Hashimoto, Minoru Suzuki, Masahiro Chono, and Chris Benoit. The New Japan Dojo had a reputation for being particularly harsh on its trainees, both mentally and physically, with the intent of only graduating the very best of each class. However, Funaki stunned the New Japan trainers with his athleticism, timing and natural talent for submission grappling. Along with the former Highschool Wrestler Minoru Suzuki, Funaki formed a strong bond with the dojo's head grappling instructor, Yoshiaki Fujiwara. Funaki debuted as a junior heavyweight at the age of 15; a record for the youngest debut in NJPW.

After debuting for New Japan on March 3, 1985, in a losing effort against three-year veteran Tatsutoshi Goto, Funaki did not receive a push from the promotion, stuck in the junior heavyweight division during a time when NJPW owner Antonio Inoki decided to shift the focus of the company towards the heavyweight division. Funaki did, often teaming with fellow wrestler Akira Nogami have many memorable matches with Yoji Anjo and Tatsuo Nakano belonging to UWF and became the first person to take the Shooting Star Press from Yamada. In 1988, he was sent on a learning excursion to Europe, competing in the Catch Wrestling Association (CWA) in Austria and Germany and for All Star Wrestling (ASW) in England in 1989 where "Flying" Funaki and "Fuji" Yamada were a tag team.

When New Japan top draw Akira Maeda became so frustrated with backstage politics that he shoot kicked Riki Choshu and broke his eye socket, and was subsequently suspended for refusing to go on an excursion to Mexico, Maeda left NJPW to form the Newborn UWF promotion. Funaki, seeing an opportunity to shine and showcase his talents, wanted to follow. Maeda negotiated the acquisition of Funaki's contract, along the contracts of friend Minoru Suzuki and mentor Yoshiaki Fujiwara for an undisclosed amount of money.

=== Newborn UWF and Pro Wrestling Fujiwara Gumi (1989–1993) ===
In Newborn UWF, Funaki became a top draw for the promotion acting as a nemesis to Akira Maeda. When Newborn UWF folded in December 1990, Funaki decided to sign with mentor Fujiwara's new Pro Wrestling Fujiwara Gumi (PWFG) promotion. Funaki left PWFG in 1993 to form the mixed martial arts promotion Pancrase. Around the same time, Funaki was scouted by K-1 executive Kazuyoshi Ishii to compete in their '93 GP tournament, but he declined, having set his sights on MMA.

=== All Japan Pro Wrestling (2009–2013, 2015–present) ===
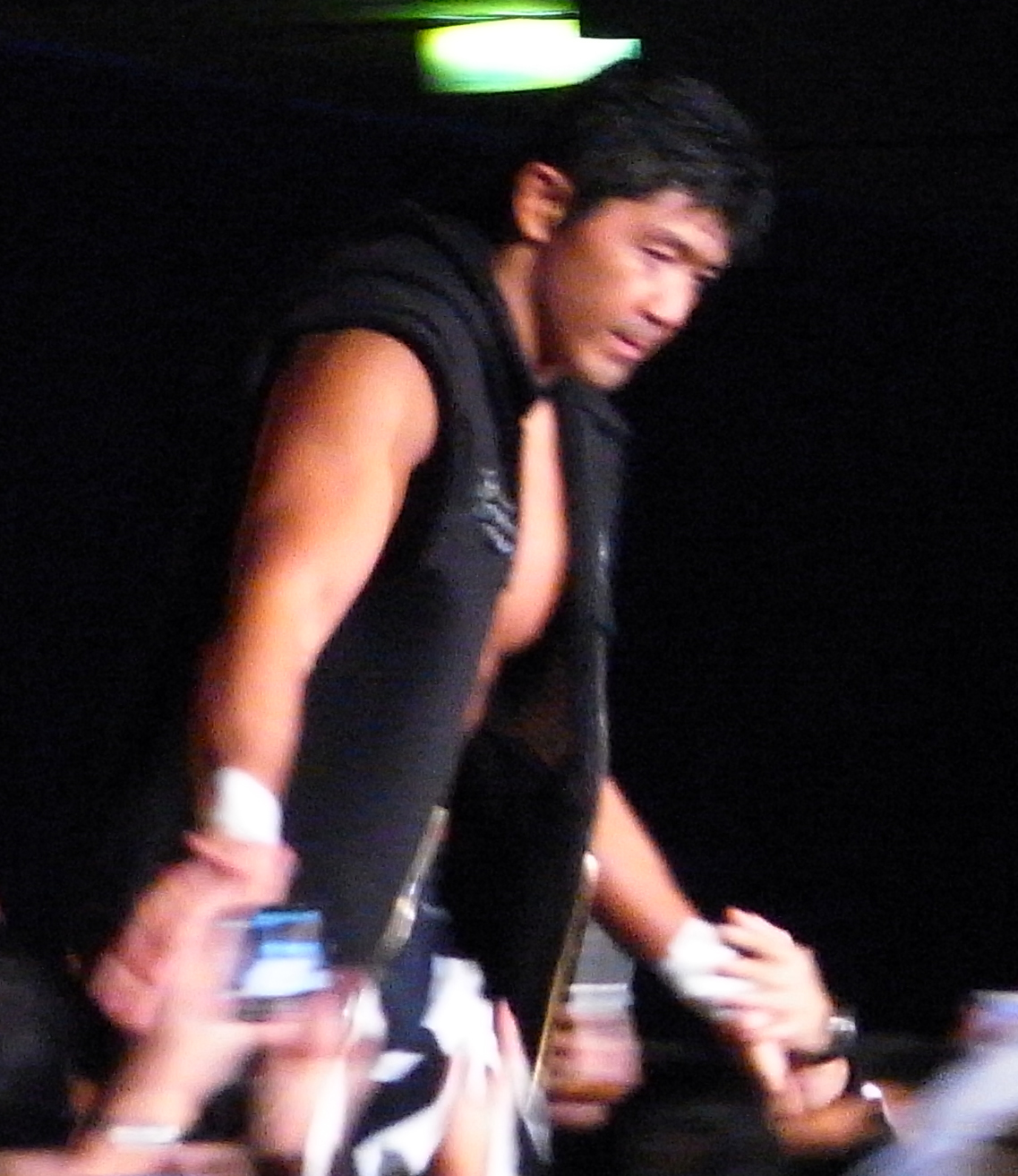
Funaki in November 2010

In August 2007, Funaki and Keiji Mutoh discussed the possibility of Funaki returning to regular professional wrestling in Mutoh's company, All Japan Pro Wrestling (AJPW). On August 31, 2009, Funaki signed a one-year contract with All Japan, following a tag team victory with Mutoh against Minoru Suzuki and Masahiro Chono.

On January 3, 2010, Funaki and Mutoh won the World Tag Team Championship from Suzuki and Taiyo Kea. On March 21, Funaki defeated Suzuki in a cage match at All Japan's Sumo Hall show.

On January 4, 2012, Funaki made a special appearance for New Japan at Wrestle Kingdom VI in Tokyo Dome, where he teamed with Masayuki Kono to defeat the Seigigun team of Yuji Nagata and Wataru Inoue. During the match, Nagata broke Funaki's orbital bone, sidelining him from in-ring action for an estimated six months. Funaki returned to the ring on June 17, 2012. On July 29, he defeated the man who had injured him, Yuji Nagata, in a grudge match to become the number one contender to the Triple Crown Heavyweight Championship. On August 26 he defeated Jun Akiyama in a match that lasted less than five minutes to become the 45th Triple Crown Heavyweight Champion. He lost the title to Suwama on March 17, 2013. In June 2013, Funaki announced his resignation from All Japan in the aftermath of Nobuo Shiraishi taking over as the new president and Keiji Mutoh leaving the promotion. Funaki's final match for the promotion took place on June 30 and saw him and his Stack of Arms partners Koji Kanemoto and Masayuki Kono, who were also leaving All Japan, lose to Akebono, Osamu Nishimura and Ryota Hama in a six-man tag team match.

After becoming a freelancer, Funaki returned to All Japan on November 11, 2015, teaming with Kendo Ka Shin to defeat Suwama and Hikaru Sato. Funaki periodically shows up in All Japan for tag team matches but has not expressed a will to contend for titles again.

=== Wrestle-1 (2013–2015) ===
On July 10, 2013, Funaki was announced as part of Keiji Mutoh's new Wrestle-1 (W-1) promotion. During the promotion's inaugural event on September 8, Funaki teamed with Masayuki Kono in a tag team match, where they were defeated by Katsuyori Shibata and Kazushi Sakuraba. Following the match, Kono turned on Funaki, hitting his mentor with a steel chair. Funaki and Kono faced off in a singles match at Wrestle 1's second show on September 15, where Kono was victorious with help from Kazma Sakamoto and Ryoji Sai. A rematch between the two took place on October 12 and saw Funaki emerge victorious. On March 2 at Kaisen: Outbreak, Funaki defeated Total Nonstop Action Wrestling (TNA) representative Bobby Roode in an interpromotional match, after which he challenged Olympic gold medalist Kurt Angle to a match. At Wrestle-1's July 6 event, Funaki defeated Pro Wrestling Zero1 (Zero1) representative Kohei Sato to win the World Heavyweight Championship. He lost the title back to Sato on September 19. Three days later, Funaki entered the Wrestle-1 Championship tournament, defeating Tajiri in his first round match. The following day, Funaki defeated Akira to advance to the semifinals of the tournament. Prior to the semifinals of the tournament, Funaki entered a storyline, where his former rival Tajiri came to his aid to help him prepare for his match. On October 8, Funaki was eliminated from the tournament in the semifinals by Masayuki Kono, after Tajiri turned on him. In June 2015, it was announced that Funaki would be leaving Wrestle-1 and going freelance following his contract expiring at the end of the month. His final match for the promotion took place on June 20.

=== Freelancing (2015–present) ===
Funaki wrestled his first match as a freelancer on August 18, 2015, at a Masahito Kakihara cancer benefit show, where he and Minoru Suzuki defeated Mitsuya Nagai and Takaku Fuke. On September 18, Funaki won his first title since becoming a freelancer, when he defeated Real Japan Pro Wrestling (RJPW) wrestler Super Tiger to win the Legend Championship. He lost the title to Daisuke Sekimoto on December 9, before regaining it on June 23, 2016. On September 10, Funaki lost the Legend Championship to Shinjiro Otani. On January 9, 2017, Funaki and Yukio Sakaguchi defeated Konosuke Takeshita and Mike Bailey at a DDT Pro-Wrestling (DDT) event to win the promotion's KO-D Tag Team Championship. They lost the titles to Danshoku Dino and Yoshihiro Takayama in their third defense on April 29. Funaki Wrestled at NOAH – DESTINATION 2021 BACK TO BUDOKAN! on 2/12/21 in a losing effort versus Kenoh for the GHC National Title.

== Mixed martial arts career ==
=== Overview ===
Funaki's MMA career began when he founded Pancrase along with Minoru Suzuki. Funaki went on to defeat Bas Rutten, Ken Shamrock, Frank Shamrock, Minoru Suzuki, and Guy Mezger, among others. Frank Shamrock said, "Funaki was like a mad scientist. He took the idea of submissions to an even higher level than the rest of the Japanese contingent. He had this insatiable desire to learn more and push his body harder. And as an entertainer he understood the need to entertain."

This realization for the need to entertain often resulted in Funaki (along with Minoru Suzuki) "carrying" some of their opponents during fights. In essence, in order to entertain the crowd, Funaki and Suzuki would occasionally give their opponents opportunities to create drama before finally finishing them off. Josh Barnett said, "when you're that good, you can have a guy thinking he's doing so much better than he expected and have no idea that they're just letting you last like a cat playing with a mouse." Frank Shamrock added, "I know for a fact those guys (Funaki and Suzuki) were light years ahead of everyone else, and they were so good that they would go towards entertainment before they finished a match." However, this did backfire on Funaki on at least one occasion. In a match against Jason DeLucia, Funaki allowed Delucia to catch him in a kneebar in order to create drama and planned on using a rope escape once Delucia had the submission locked in. Unfortunately, Funaki mistakenly allowed himself to get too far from the ropes and was forced to tap out.

=== Pancrase (1993–1999) ===
Funaki debuted in the main event of Pancrase's first show, taking on apprentice and training partner Ken Shamrock. Although Funaki led the pace of the match earlier with strikes, Shamrock captured his back, took him down and eventually submitted him with an arm triangle choke, winning the fight. The victory elevated Shamrock to star status and launched the MMA career of both men. Masakatsu got his first victory at the next event, showing his submission skills by catching Ryushi Yanagisawa first in a heel hook and later in a kneebar in under two minutes for the victory. He would then face Dutch fighter Cees Bezems, who threw illegal closed-fisted punches during the match. In response, Funaki executed a takedown and submitted him with a top wrist lock; after the tap out, Funaki again locked in the hold as revenge, and had to be restrained by the referee. Funaki closed the first four Pancrase events with a win against Kazuo "Yoshiki" Takahashi, overwhelming him with palm strikes and knees to the face for the KO.

Opening 1994, Funaki faced another Dutch martial arts exponent in the form of Bas Rutten. Masakatsu led him to the ground and sieged Rutten's guard, and after the Dutchman got distracted after an accidental illegal strike, Funaki caught his leg and executed a toehold, making his opponent submit. Later in the year, Funaki got his revenge against Ken Shamrock just days before the latter's participation in the Ultimate Fighting Championship, choking him out with a rear naked choke. In December, Funaki took part in the tournament for the first King of Pancrase title. He submitted Todd Bjornethun at the first round with a sequence of yoko-tomoe-nage into mount to armbar, and then faced Vernon White in a longer match, with Funaki making a wide usage of triangle chokes and sweeps in order to get a top wrist lock. Finally, Funaki faced Ken Shamrock for a third time at the finals, but although Masakatsu was able to fend Ken off for several minutes, he was mounted and submitted with an arm triangle choke, the same hold Shamrock had used in their first match.

In 1995, after taking revenge on Jason DeLucia by defeating him via submission, Funaki was pitted against Frank Shamrock, Ken's adoptive brother and next rising star of the company. Funaki again showed his newfound affinity for working from the bottom, fending Frank off from his guard and catching him in a triangle choke/kimura combination for a rope escape, before finishing him with a toehold. Funaki's next match would be an upset loss to former Shooto fighter Manabu Yamada, in which Yamada flipped over a mount and caught Funaki in a heel hook for the finish. Funaki bounced back against Pancrase rookie Guy Mezger in a back and forth match, which saw Mezger dominating the action with kicks, strikes and pressure until Funaki clamped an achilles lock to get the win.

Funaki's last high level bout in 1995 would be a rematch with Frank Shamrock. Funaki mocked Frank, keeping his hands low and even throwing a flying spinning heel kick in an instance, but he was caught in a choke and forced to spend a rope escape before returning the favor with a triangle armbar. Funaki got the advantage in points with a rolling toehold, but he then was shockingly forced to tap out in a leglock exchange, losing the match. In his biography, Shamrock claims to believe that Funaki took a dive and allowed himself to be defeated in order to build Frank's popularity.

At Pancrase 1996 Anniversary Show, Masakatsu challenged King of Pancrase Bas Rutten in what is considered to be one of the greatest fights in Pancrase history. Funaki came close to finishing the match earlier with an ankle lock, but Rutten miraculously escaped and continued to fight. Funaki made a wide usage of the knee-on-stomach and mount positions to initiate leglock attacks, but the Dutchman countered every time and eventually pushed Masakatsu away from him, after which Funaki threw an illegal kick to Rutten, who was on his knees. Rutten proceeded to knock Funaki down with a palm strike, and then completely broke his nose with a second palm strike. Stunned, Funaki tried to stand up with Rutten, only for Bas to capitalize with his famed striking game. Rutten knocked him down twice with palms and knees, and then landed a lengthy, unanswered string of strikes, until a knee to the face finally downed Funaki.

By the end of 1998, Funaki started fighting in Pancrase under the vale tudo rules made famous by Ultimate Fighting Championship and Pride Fighting Championships, which he had previously criticized as too brutal. The turn was detrimental for the end of his career, as accumulated injuries and ring wear of over forty fights had greatly broken down his body. After defeating John Renken, he fought a match against luta livre expert Ebenezer Fontes Braga. Funaki was dominated and would have loss had there been judges in the match, but as it was not the case, it ended in a draw. Funaki departed from Pancrase after a win over Tony Petarra in September 1999, according to fellow Pancrase fighter Bas Rutten, being burnt out from the hectic Pancrase schedule.

=== Fight against Rickson Gracie and retirement (2000) ===
Despite the state of Funaki's health, he returned for a fight against the legendary Rickson Gracie at Colosseum 2000 held at the Tokyo Dome. The show was almost canceled due to Rickson trying to change the rules to make knees and strikes to the head illegal, but the problems were overcome and the show continued. The event was broadcast to 30 million TV Tokyo viewers. There was no championship title at stake and Rickson got the majority of his demands, with elbows and knees to the head being rendered illegal standing or on the ground.

Funaki walked to the ring in samurai attire with a samurai sword which garnered a roaring excitement from the Japanese announcers and crowd. Funaki and Rickson clinched to the corner, where Funaki appeared to have secured a guillotine choke. Funaki then took Rickson down, relinquishing the choke as they hit the mat and landing a hammer-fist that marked Rickson's face before standing up. The Japanese then kicked the Brazilian's legs to no effect, until according to reports, some well timed upkicks from Gracie in return blew out Funaki's injured right knee. They clinched again, but Funaki's knee rendered him unable to wrestle correctly, and he was taken down by the Brazilian grappler, who promptly mounted him. Masakatsu looked stunned while Rickson bloodied his face with ground and pound, and finally Gracie forced his way into a rear-naked choke. Funaki refused to submit to the hold, passing out before his cornerman Yoshiki Takahashi threw the towel.

After the match, Funaki declared to be underhwlmed with his own performance and announced his retire from MMA competition. As no injury was disclosed, pundits found inexplicable how easily he had been dominated after being taken down, a situation compared to that of Nobuhiko Takada. He had a retirement ceremony in Pancrase in late 2000.

=== K-1 and DREAM (2007–2008) ===
On December 31, 2007, Funaki came out of retirement to fight Kazushi Sakuraba, who had just defeated Funaki's apprentice Katsuyori Shibata. Appropriately, their bout took place in the main event of K-1's year end Dynamite!! show, which garners more TV viewers each year than any other televised mixed martial arts event in Japan. The two fighters exchanged colorful entrances at the arena, Funaki wearing a long robe and mask patterned after the Aomori Nebuta Matsuri during his entrance to the ring.

Once in the match, Sakuraba was able to sneak in a double leg takedown after Funaki committed heavily to a missed right cross. Funaki closed guard around Sakuraba before opening it up to spin for a kneebar, and for a moment Funaki appeared to secure Sakuraba's leg, but he was thwarted by a combination of Sakuraba's submission acumen and their position against the ring ropes. Sakuraba then maneuvered to Funaki's back, only for the Pancrase founder to roll back into the guard position. Breaking away momentarily from the grappling contest, Sakuraba stood up and began to assault Funaki's legs with a series of kicks, which Funaki answered with an upkick of his own, cutting Sakuraba's eye. Kazushi then returned himself to the ground, where Funaki immediately attempted to sweep him, but Sakuraba blocked the attempt and secured a double wristlock, eventually forcing Funaki to submit.

Funaki signed a contract with Fighting and Entertainment Group's MMA promotion, DREAM. On April 28, 2008, Funaki participated in DREAM's first ever Middle-weight Grand Prix. Funaki was matched against Kiyoshi Tamura at the opening round of the Dream 2: Middleweight Grand Prix 2008 First Round in Saitama, Japan. After a hard opening exchange between the two, Funaki was staggered by a punch and pulled guard on Tamura, from where he was pounded to an eventual TKO at 57 seconds of Round 1. This was his first TKO stoppage loss since September 14, 1998, when he was knocked out with a body blow by Semmy Schilt. With the loss, Funaki was eliminated from the Middle-weight Grand Prix.

After losing twice in a row since his comeback to the MMA ring, Funaki was determined to prove that he was still a worthy competitor of the sport and participated again in the promotion's middleweight division. At the Dream 6: Middleweight Grand Prix 2008 Final Round event that took place on September 23, 2008, at the Saitama Super Arena in Saitama, Japan, Funaki was matched with one of his former Pancrase students, "Minowaman" Ikuhisa Minowa. In the opening seconds of the first round of the match, Funaki came at his former charge with a series of kicks, practically forcing Minowa to catch one of the kicks. Funaki capitalized immediately, leaping directly into a heel-hook. Minowa escaped the hold, but Funaki maintained control of his leg and immediately attacked with a heel-hook from the cross-body position, forcing his protege to tap at 52 seconds of the first round.

=== Fighting Network Rings (2012) ===
Masakatsu Funaki was scheduled to face Russian fighter Magomedkhan "Volk Han" Amanulayevich Gamzatkhanov in a fight resembling the Pancrase Hybrid Wrestling format for the Fighting Network Rings (RINGS) organization. The fight ended in a draw, with Volk Han announcing his retirement afterwards.

== Filmography ==
=== Anime ===
| Year | Title | Role | Notes |
|---|---|---|---|
| 1994 | Street Fighter II: The Animated Movie | Fei Long | |
| 1996 | The Hard - Bounty Hunter | Tyron | |
| 2001 | ShootFighter Tekken | Seiko "Oton" Miyazawa | |
| 2009 | Baton | Hades | |

=== Movies ===
| Year | Title | Role | Notes |
|---|---|---|---|
| 2000 | Gojoe: Spirit War Chronicle | Tankai | |
| 2001 | Electric Dragon 80.000 V | Narrator | |
| 2001 | Shadow Fury | Takeru | |
| 2003 | Shin karate baka ichidai 2 | Kung Fu Fighter | |
| 2004 | Devilman | Jinmen | |
| 2004 | Godzilla: Final Wars | Kumasaka | |
| 2004 | Shinsetsu Tiger Mask | Satoru Sayama/Tiger Mask | |
| 2004 | Rikidōzan | Masahiko Kimura | |
| 2006 | Like a Dragon: Prologue | Kazuma Kiryu | |

=== Video games ===
| Year | Title | Notes |
|---|---|---|
| 1991 | Fire Pro Wrestling 2nd Bout | |
| 1991 | Super Fire Pro Wrestling | |
| 1992 | Super Fire Pro Wrestling 2 | |
| 1993 | Fire Pro Wrestling 3: Legend Bout | |
| 1993 | Super Fire Pro Wrestling III: Final Bout | |
| 1993 | Super Fire Pro Wrestling III: Easy Type | |
| 1994 | Super Fire Pro Wrestling Special | |
| 1995 | Super Fire Pro Wrestling X | |
| 1995 | Gekitou Burning Pro Wrestling | |
| 1996 | Super Fire Pro Wrestling X Premium | |
| 1994 | Funaki Masakatsu no Hybrid Wrestler: Tōgi Denshō | |
| 1997 | Virtual Pro Wrestling 64 | |
| 2000 | Virtual Pro Wrestling 2: Ōdō Keishō | |
| 2007 | Wrestle Kingdom 2 | |

== Championships and accomplishments ==
=== Mixed martial arts ===
- Pancrase Hybrid Wrestling

- King of Pancrase (2 times)
- 1996 King of Pancrase Championship Tournament Winner
- 1994 King of Pancrase Championship Tournament Semifinalist

- Fight Matrix
  - 1997 Fighter of the Year

=== Professional wrestling ===
- All Japan Pro Wrestling

- Triple Crown Heavyweight Championship (1 time)
- World Tag Team Championship (1 time) – with Keiji Mutoh
- Akiho Yoshizawa Cup (2010) – with Keiji Mutoh and S1 Mask
- World's Strongest Tag Determination League (2009) – with Keiji Mutoh

- Chō Hanabi Puroresu

- Bakuha-ō Championship (1 time)

- DDT Pro-Wrestling

- KO-D Tag Team Championship (1 time) – with Yukio Sakaguchi

- Dradition

- Dragon Cup (2023) – with Leona

- Nikkan Sports

- Match of the Year Award (2010) vs. Minoru Suzuki on March 21
- Best Tag Team Award (2009) with Keiji Mutoh

- Pro Wrestling Illustrated
  - Ranked No. 65 of the top 500 singles wrestlers in the PWI 500 in 2013
  - Ranked No. 251 of the 500 best singles wrestlers during the "PWI Years" in 2003
- Pro Wrestling Noah

- GHC National Championship (1 time)

- Pro Wrestling Zero1

- World Heavyweight Championship (1 time)

- Real Japan Pro Wrestling/Strong Style Pro-Wrestling

- Legend Championship (4 times)

- Tokyo Sports

- Fighting Spirit Award (1990)
- Service Award (2000)
- Technique Award (1993)

- Wrestling Observer Newsletter

- Wrestling Observer Newsletter Hall of Fame (Class of 2006)

== Mixed martial arts record ==
Professional record breakdown
| 54 matches | 39 wins | 13 losses |
| By knockout | 5 | 3 |
| By submission | 33 | 8 |
| By decision | 1 | 2 |
| Draws | 2 | |

| Res. | Record | Opponent | Method | Event | Date | Round | Time | Location | Notes |
|---|---|---|---|---|---|---|---|---|---|
| Draw | 39–13–2 | Volk Han | Draw (majority) | Rings/The Outsider: Volk Han Retirement Match | December 16, 2012 | 1 | 15:00 | Tokyo, Japan | |
| Win | 39–13–1 | Ikuhisa Minowa | Submission (heel hook) | Dream 6: Middleweight Grand Prix 2008 Final Round | September 23, 2008 | 1 | 0:52 | Saitama, Japan | |
| Loss | 38–13–1 | Kiyoshi Tamura | TKO (punches) | Dream 2: Middleweight Grand Prix 2008 First Round | April 29, 2008 | 1 | 0:57 | Saitama, Japan | |
| Loss | 38–12–1 | Kazushi Sakuraba | Submission (kimura) | K-1 Premium 2007 Dynamite!! | December 31, 2007 | 1 | 6:25 | Osaka, Japan | |
| Loss | 38–11–1 | Rickson Gracie | Technical submission (rear naked choke) | Colosseum 2000 | March 26, 2000 | 1 | 12:49 | Tokyo, Japan | Special rules: no knees or elbows to head standing up or on ground |
| Win | 38–10–1 | Tony Petarra | Submission (punches) | Pancrase: 1999 Anniversary Show | September 18, 1999 | 1 | 1:16 | Urayasu, Chiba, Japan | |
| Draw | 37–10–1 | Ebenezer Fontes Braga | Draw | Pancrase: Breakthrough 4 | April 18, 1999 | 1 | 15:00 | Yokohama, Kanagawa, Japan | |
| Win | 37–10 | John Renken | Submission (punches) | Pancrase: Advance 12 | December 19, 1998 | 1 | 5:50 | Urayasu, Chiba, Japan | |
| Loss | 36–10 | Kiuma Kunioku | Decision (lost points) | Pancrase: Advance 10 | October 26, 1998 | 1 | 15:00 | Tokyo, Japan | |
| Loss | 36–9 | Semmy Schilt | KO (punch to the body) | Pancrase: 1998 Anniversary Show | September 14, 1998 | 1 | 7:13 | Tokyo, Japan | |
| Win | 36–8 | Osami Shibuya | Submission (arm triangle choke) | Pancrase: 1998 Neo-Blood Tournament Second Round | July 26, 1998 | 1 | 6:07 | Aomori, Japan | |
| Loss | 35–8 | Guy Mezger | Decision (unanimous) | Pancrase: Advance 5 | April 26, 1998 | 1 | 30:00 | Yokohama, Kanagawa, Japan | Lost the Pancrase Openweight Championship. |
| Win | 35–7 | Semmy Schilt | Decision (lost points) | Pancrase: Advance 4 | March 18, 1998 | 1 | 15:00 | Tokyo, Japan | |
| Win | 34–7 | Katsuomi Inagaki | Submission | Pancrase: Advance 2 | February 6, 1998 | 1 | 2:36 | Yokohama, Kanagawa, Japan | |
| Win | 33–7 | Yuki Kondo | Submission (triangle kimura) | Pancrase: Alive 11 | December 20, 1997 | 1 | 2:20 | Yokohama, Kanagawa, Japan | Won the Pancrase Openweight Championship. |
| Win | 32–7 | Jason Godsey | Submission (calf slicer) | Pancrase: Alive 10 | November 16, 1997 | 1 | 7:12 | Kobe, Hyogo, Japan | |
| Win | 31–7 | Guy Mezger | Submission (triangle armbar) | Pancrase: 1997 Anniversary Show | September 6, 1997 | 1 | 3:58 | Urayasu, Chiba, Japan | |
| Win | 30–7 | Osami Shibuya | Submission (guillotine choke) | Pancrase: 1997 Neo-Blood Tournament, Round 1 | July 20, 1997 | 1 | 2:34 | Tokyo, Japan | |
| Win | 29–7 | Wes Gassaway | Submission (achilles lock) | Pancrase: Alive 7 | June 30, 1997 | 1 | 1:05 | Hakata, Fukuoka, Japan | |
| Loss | 28–7 | Yuki Kondo | Submission (triangle armbar) | Pancrase: Alive 4 | April 27, 1997 | 1 | 2:34 | Urayasu, Chiba, Japan | Lost the Pancrase Openweight Championship. |
| Win | 28–6 | Paul Lazenby | Submission (top wristlock) | Pancrase: Alive 3 | March 22, 1997 | 1 | 4:36 | Nagoya, Aichi, Japan | |
| Win | 27–6 | Semmy Schilt | Submission (toe hold) | Pancrase: Alive 2 | February 22, 1997 | 1 | 5:47 | Urayasu, Chiba, Japan | |
| Win | 26–6 | Jason DeLucia | TKO (leg injury) | Pancrase: Truth 10 | December 15, 1996 | 1 | 2:34 | Tokyo, Japan | Won the vacant Pancrase Openweight Championship. |
| Win | 25–6 | Yuki Kondo | Submission (rear-naked choke) | Pancrase: Truth 9 | November 9, 1996 | 1 | 1:43 | Fukuoka, Japan | |
| Loss | 24–6 | Bas Rutten | KO (knee) | Pancrase: 1996 Anniversary Show | September 7, 1996 | 1 | 17:05 | Urayasu, Chiba, Japan | For the Pancrase Openweight Championship. |
| Win | 24–5 | Takafumi Ito | Submission (rear-naked choke) | Pancrase: 1996 Neo-Blood Tournament, Round 2 | July 23, 1996 | 1 | 2:01 | Tokyo, Japan | |
| Win | 23–5 | Vernon White | Submission (achilles lock) | Pancrase: Truth 6 | June 25, 1996 | 1 | 2:34 | Fukuoka, Japan | |
| Win | 22–5 | August Smisl | Submission (rear-naked choke) | Pancrase: Truth 5 | May 16, 1996 | 1 | 2:01 | Tokyo, Japan | |
| Win | 21–5 | Katsuomi Inagaki | Submission (kneebar) | Pancrase: Truth 2 | March 2, 1996 | 1 | 1:14 | Kobe, Hyogo, Japan | |
| Win | 20–5 | Ryushi Yanagisawa | Technical Submission (americana) | Pancrase: Truth 1 | January 28, 1996 | 1 | 8:42 | Yokohama, Kanagawa, Japan | |
| Win | 19–5 | Takaku Fuke | Submission (rear-naked choke) | Pancrase: Eyes of Beast 7 | December 14, 1995 | 1 | 0:31 | Sapporo, Hokkaido, Japan | |
| Loss | 18–5 | Frank Shamrock | Submission (toe hold) | Pancrase: Eyes of Beast 6 | November 4, 1995 | 1 | 10:31 | Yokohama, Kanagawa, Japan | |
| Win | 18–4 | Guy Mezger | Submission (achilles lock) | Pancrase: 1995 Anniversary Show | September 1, 1995 | 1 | 6:46 | Tokyo, Japan | |
| Win | 17–4 | Leon Dijk | Submission (achilles lock) | Pancrase: 1995 Neo-Blood Tournament Second Round | July 23, 1995 | 1 | 1:01 | Tokyo, Japan | |
| Win | 16–4 | Gregory Smit | Submission (achilles lock) | Pancrase: Eyes of Beast 5 | July 13, 1995 | 1 | 7:30 | Tokyo, Japan | |
| Win | 15–4 | Alex Cook | Submission (heel hook) | Pancrase: Eyes of Beast 4 | May 13, 1995 | 1 | 7:14 | Urayasu, Chiba, Japan | |
| Loss | 14–4 | Manabu Yamada | Submission (heel hook) | Pancrase: Eyes of Beast 3 | April 8, 1995 | 1 | 4:43 | Nagoya, Aichi, Japan | |
| Win | 14–3 | Frank Shamrock | Submission (toe hold) | Pancrase: Eyes of Beast 2 | March 10, 1995 | 1 | 5:11 | Yokohama, Kanagawa, Japan | |
| Win | 13–3 | Jason DeLucia | Submission (heel hook) | Pancrase: Eyes of Beast 1 | January 26, 1995 | 1 | 9:04 | Nagoya, Aichi, Japan | |
| Loss | 12–3 | Ken Shamrock | Submission (arm-triangle choke) | Pancrase: King of Pancrase Tournament Second Round | December 17, 1994 | 1 | 5:50 | Tokyo, Japan | |
| Win | 12–2 | Vernon White | Submission (americana) | Pancrase: King of Pancrase Tournament Opening Round | December 16, 1994 | 1 | 5:37 | Tokyo, Japan | |
| Win | 11–2 | Todd Bjornethun | Submission (armbar) | Pancrase: King of Pancrase Tournament Opening Round | December 16, 1994 | 1 | 2:20 | Tokyo, Japan | |
| Win | 10–2 | Minoru Suzuki | Technical Submission (rear-naked choke) | Pancrase: Road to the Championship 5 | October 15, 1994 | 1 | 1:51 | Tokyo, Japan | |
| Win | 9–2 | Ken Shamrock | Submission (rear-naked choke) | Pancrase: Road to the Championship 4 | September 1, 1994 | 1 | 2:30 | Osaka, Japan | |
| Win | 8–2 | Scott "Bam Bam" Sullivan | Submission (heel hook) | Pancrase: Road to the Championship 3 | July 26, 1994 | 1 | 0:56 | Tokyo, Japan | |
| Loss | 7–2 | Jason DeLucia | Submission (kneebar) | Pancrase: Road to the Championship 2 | July 6, 1994 | 1 | 1:01 | Amagasaki, Hyogo, Japan | |
| Win | 7–1 | Gregory Smit | Submission (rear-naked choke) | Pancrase: Road to the Championship 1 | May 31, 1994 | 1 | 1:58 | Tokyo, Japan | |
| Win | 6–1 | Takaku Fuke | Submission (rear-naked choke) | Pancrase: Pancrash! 3 | April 21, 1994 | 1 | 6:55 | Osaka, Japan | |
| Win | 5–1 | Vernon White | KO (palm strike) | Pancrase: Pancrash! 2 | March 12, 1994 | 1 | 1:13 | Nagoya, Aichi, Japan | |
| Win | 4–1 | Bas Rutten | Submission (toe hold) | Pancrase: Pancrash! 1 | January 19, 1994 | 1 | 2:58 | Yokohama, Kanagawa, Japan | |
| Win | 3–1 | Kazuo Takahashi | KO (palm strikes and knees) | Pancrase: Yes, We Are Hybrid Wrestlers 4 | December 8, 1993 | 1 | 3:09 | Hakata, Fukuoka, Japan | |
| Win | 2–1 | Cees Bezems | Submission (americana) | Pancrase: Yes, We Are Hybrid Wrestlers 3 | November 8, 1993 | 1 | 1:42 | Kobe, Hyogo, Japan | |
| Win | 1–1 | Ryushi Yanagisawa | Submission (kneebar) | Pancrase: Yes, We Are Hybrid Wrestlers 2 | October 14, 1993 | 1 | 1:35 | Nagoya, Aichi, Japan | |
| Loss | 0–1 | Ken Shamrock | Submission (arm-triangle choke) | Pancrase: Yes, We Are Hybrid Wrestlers 1 | September 21, 1993 | 1 | 6:15 | Urayasu, Chiba, Japan | |

== See also ==
- List of professional wrestlers by MMA record
