= Battlarts =

Japanese professional wrestling promotion

- Founded: 1996
- Defunct: 2011
- Style: Bati-bati style (Shoot style wrestling)
- Headquarters: Koshigaya, Saitama, Japan
- Founder: Yuki Ishikawa
- Owner: Yuki Ishikawa
- Predecessor: Pro Wrestling Fujiwara Gumi
- Successor: Professional Wrestling Wallabee; Battle Arts; Battle Art Pro-Wrestling; Kakuto Tanteidan

Kakuto Tanteidan Battlarts (格闘探偵団バトラーツ, Kakutō Tanteidan Batorātsu; "Fighting Detectives Battlarts" or "Fighting Investigation Team Battlarts"), more commonly referred to as simply Battlarts (also stylized as BattlARTS) was a professional wrestling promotion founded in 1996 by Yuki Ishikawa following the mass exodus he led from Pro Wrestling Fujiwara Gumi (PWFG) amidst the financial struggle that ultimately led the company to fold. The initial promotion's roster was composed of the entire PWFG roster that did not depart for Pancrase, thus making Battlarts a direct successor to PWFG.

Battlarts developed its distinctive bati-bati style, which blended the realistic presentation and technical grappling of shoot-style wrestling with the dramatic conventions and athletic maneuvers of traditional professional wrestling. While retaining an emphasis on stiff strikes, submission holds and realistic-looking combat exchanges, the style also incorporated conventional professional wrestling techniques, high-impact moves and theatrical match storytelling.

The promotion ceased operations in 2011, but was succeeded in 2023 by the independent Kakuto Tanteidan project led by Fuminori Abe and Takuya Nomura.

== History ==
The promotion was formed in 1996 by Japanese wrestler Yuki Ishikawa and featured all of the wrestlers from the Fujiwara Gumi promotion, who had abandoned the promotion in favor of Battlarts. They ran shows in the Tokyo area regularly from 1998 to 2002.

Even though Battlarts' style was based on shoot wrestling, the promotion often cooperated with other shoot style and mixed martial arts promotions, including Fighting Network Rings, Kingdom, Michinoku Pro and Big Japan Pro Wrestling, therefore matches sometimes resembled more traditional professional wrestling matches. The biggest co-promotion occurred on October 17, 1999, when Battlarts and The Great Sasuke's Michinoku Pro Wrestling produced "Michinoku Pro vs. Battlarts", which was headlined by a tag team match pitting the owners of both promotions (Great Sasuke and Ishikawa) against Jinsei Shinzaki and Alexander Otsuka.

The promotion ceased running regular shows and events in 2001 due to "management aggravation". Battlarts eventually began to run monthly shows mainly in Tokyo, Saitama, and Shizuoka Prefecture, often co-promoting with Daisuke Ikeda's Fu-ten, Kiyoshi Tamura's U-Style and Satoru Sayama's Real Japan Pro Wrestling promotions. On September 14, 2008, at a press conference with Yuki Ishikawa and Shinjiro Otani Battlarts announced a working agreement with Pro Wrestling Zero1.

It was revealed in late December 2010 that Battlarts would be closing their doors sometime in 2011. The promotion held its final event on November 5, 2011.

On June 26, 2023, Fuminori Abe and Takuya Nomura held a press conference to announce they would hold an independent show titled We Are Kakuto Tanteidan (ぼくらは格闘探偵団, Bokura wa Kakutō Tanteidan) on October 12 at Shinjuku Face, broadcast on Wrestle Universe. This led to the creation of the Battlarts revival project Kakuto Tanteidan which now holds one or two events each year.

== Alumni ==
- Bob Backlund
- Johnny Geo Basco
- Dieuseul Berto
- Hayato Fujita
- Minoru Fujita
- Shoichi Funaki
- Ikuto Hidaka
- Ryuji Hijikata
- Daisuke Ikeda
- Yuki Ishikawa
- Ryuichi Kawakami
- Carl Malenko
- Joe Malenko
- Masaaki Mochizuki
- Masao Orihara
- Alexander Otsuka
- Shannon Ritch
- Road Warrior Animal
- Road Warrior Hawk
- Munenori Sawa
- Super Tiger II
- Taka Michinoku
- Minoru Tanaka
- Tiger Shark
- Turtle Kamen
- Katsumi Usuda
- The Willow
- Keita Yano
- Muhammad Yone

== Championships ==
| Championship | Final recognized champion(s) | Date won |
|---|---|---|
| UWA World Middleweight Championship | Psycho | August 9, 2009 |
| Independent World Junior Heavyweight Championship | Marines Mask II | April 2, 2010 |
| FMW Brass Knuckles Tag Team Championship | Koji Nakagawa and Gedo | June 13, 1999 |
| P☆Mix Tag Team Championship | Gran Hamada and Ayako Hamada | June 29, 2000 |

== See also ==
- Professional wrestling in Japan
- List of professional wrestling promotions in Japan
