= Daisuke Ikeda =

Japanese professional wrestler (born 1968)

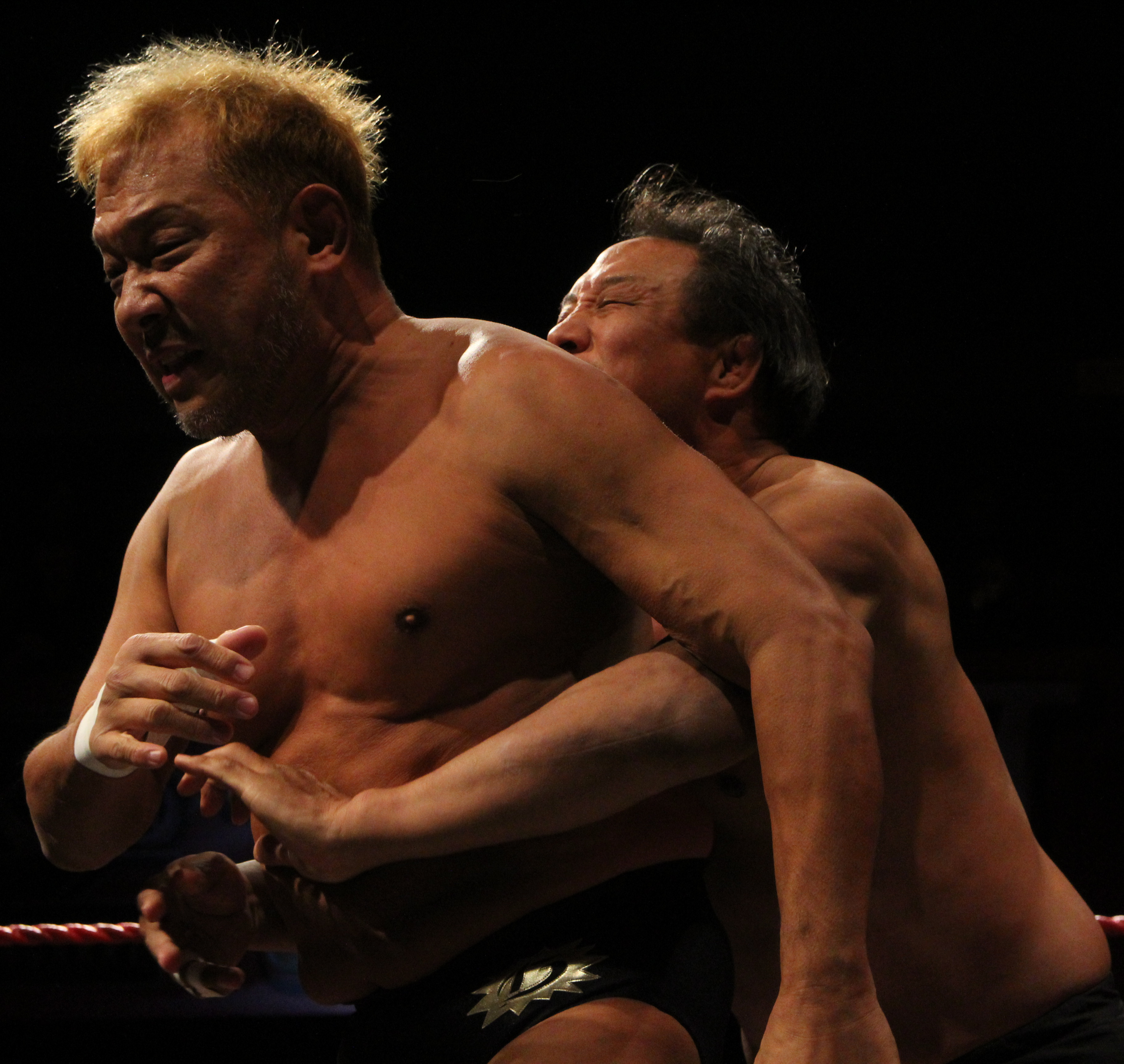
- Ikeda (left) in March 2020 at wXw Ambition 12, wrestling Yuki Ishikawa

Personal information
- Born: February 13, 1968 (age 58) Ushibuka, Kumamoto, Japan

Professional wrestling career
- Ring name: Daisuke Ikeda
- Billed height: 1.80 m (5 ft 11 in)
- Billed weight: 105 kg (231 lb)
- Trained by: Yoshiaki Fujiwara
- Debut: December 5, 1993

Daisuke Ikeda (池田 大輔, Ikeda Daisuke; born February 13, 1968) is a Japanese professional wrestler who is currently wrestling in the Independent circuit in Japan. Since debuting in 1993, Ikeda has worked for a number of promotions in Japan, including Battlarts, All Japan Pro Wrestling, Pro Wrestling Noah and Frontier Martial Arts Wrestling (FMW).

== Professional wrestling career ==
Ikeda was trained by Yoshiaki Fujiwara and joined Fujiwara's promotion Fujiwara Gumi in 1993. In 1994, representing Fujiwara Gumi, he fought for Fighting Network RINGS in his only mixed martial arts fight against Tsuyoshi Kosaka in a losing effort. In 1995 he moved to BattlARTS. As one of the few heavyweights competing in a promotion made up mostly of junior heavyweights (compare Jinsei Shinzaki in Michinoku Pro Wrestling), he often had to look out of the promotion for challenges, including Shinzaki and FMW talent such as Hayabusa, Masato Tanaka, and Hiromichi Fuyuki.

In 1997 he started making appearances in All Japan Pro Wrestling, and finally in early 2000 he joined the promotion as a full-time worker.

He did not stay long as later that year he left for Mitsuharu Misawa's new promotion Pro Wrestling Noah. He briefly joined Misawa's Wave faction, but left soon after. On June 1, 2004 he beat Takeshi Morishima for the WLW Heavyweight Championship. In December 2004 he announced his departure from Noah. He now wrestles in the Japanese Independent circuit, and runs his own promotion, Fu-Ten Promotion.

== Championships and accomplishments ==
- A-Team
  - WEW World Tag Team Championship (2 times) – with HASEGAWA (1) and Keiichi Sato (1)
- Fujiwara Gumi/Battlarts
  - FMW Brass Knuckles Tag Team Championship (2 times) – with Yoshiaki Fujiwara (1), and Hayabusa (1)
  - BattlARTS Young Generation Battle League (1995, 1996, 1999, 2008)
- WLW
  - WLW Heavyweight Championship (1 time)
- Tokyo Sports
  - Newcomer Award (1995)
