= Kazunari Murakami =

Japanese professional wrestler

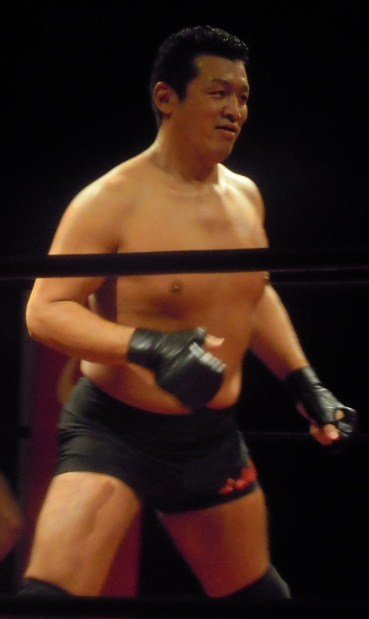
- Born: Kazunari Murakami (村上 一成, Murakami Kazunari); November 29, 1973 (age 52); Nei District, Toyama, Japan
- Native name: 村上和成
- Nationality: Japanese
- Height: 1.85 m (6 ft 1 in)
- Weight: 100 kg (220 lb)
- Division: Heavyweight
- Style: Judo, Kickboxing, Sumo
- Team: Universal Fighting-Arts Organization (UFO)
- Teacher: Yoshinori Nishi
- Rank: 4th Dan Black Belt in Judo
- Years active: 9 (1995-2003)

Mixed martial arts record
- Total: 10
- Wins: 5
- By knockout: 1
- By submission: 3
- By decision: 1
- Losses: 5
- By knockout: 4
- By submission: 1

Other information
- Mixed martial arts record from Sherdog

Kazunari Murakami
Personal information
- Born: November 29, 1973 (age 52) Toyama, Japan

Professional wrestling career
- Ring name(s): Kazunari Murakami; Big Murakami
- Billed height: 1.86 m (6 ft 1 in)
- Billed weight: 105 kg (231 lb)
- Trained by: Antonio Inoki; Satoru Sayama; NJPW Dojo
- Debut: 1998

Kazunari Murakami (村上 一成, Murakami Kazunari; ring name: 村上 和成) (born November 29, 1973) is a Japanese professional wrestler and retired mixed martial artist currently working for Pro Wrestling Noah. Murakami is best known for his work in New Japan Pro-Wrestling (NJPW) during the late 1990s and early 2000s, where he primarily competed as a member of the villainous Makai Club stable. Aside from pro wrestling, Murakami was also part of the first fight in PRIDE history, defeating John Dixson by submission in 1997.

After leaving NJPW in the fall of 2004, Murakami subsequently competed for Pro Wrestling ZERO1-MAX (ZERO1-MAX) and Big Mouth LOUD, of which he was a founding member. Murakami has also made sporadic appearances in Dramatic Dream Team (DDT), Pro Wrestling Noah (Noah) and Chō Sentō Puroresu FMW (FMW).

== Mixed martial arts career ==
Trained in Judo and Sumo since high school, Kazunari became a member of the judo team in Takushoku University. He met Wajyutsu Keishukai founder Yoshinori Nishi, who convinced him to join his team, and Murakami started his career in mixed martial arts.

Murakami began his career fighting for the Lumax Cup: Tournament of J '95 on October 13, 1995, where he lost his first fight to Akihiro Gono by knockout. A few months later, on March 30, 1996, Murakami fought at the Lumax Cup: Tournament of J '96. He fared better, defeating Isamu Osugi by submission and avenging his loss to Gono by decision, but lost to Masanori Suda by submission. In late 1996, Murakami then began fighting for Extreme Fighting where he defeated Bart Vale At EF3: Extreme Fighting 3 on October 18, 1996, by TKO. A few months later, at EF4: Extreme Fighting 4 on March 28, 1997, Murakami lost to future UFC Heavyweight Champion Maurice Smith by KO.

On October 11, 1997, Murakami made history by joining the newly formed PRIDE Fighting Championships and won in the company's first fight by defeating John Dixson at PRIDE 1. He returned to PRIDE three years later at PRIDE 10 on August 27, 2000, where he lost to Masaaki Satake by TKO. He returned to fighting two years later at UFO: Legend in a losing effort to Wallid Ismail by TKO. He last fight was at Jungle Fight 1 on September 13, 2003, where he defeated Lee Young Gun by verbal submission ending his MMA career at 5-5.

== Professional wrestling career ==
=== Early career (1998–2000) ===
Murakami entered professional wrestling in 1998 when he joined Antonio Inoki's Universal Fighting-Arts Organization alongside fellow judoka Naoya Ogawa. In June 1999, he had a brief stint wrestling for various National Wrestling Alliance affiliates in the United States. In September 1999, he began wrestling for shoot-style promotion Battlarts, where he formed a tag team with Yuki Ishikawa.

=== New Japan Pro-Wrestling (2000–2004) ===
In 2000, Murakami and Ogawa joined New Japan Pro-Wrestling. Murakami initially gained fame for attacking wrestlers while sporting a white mask, becoming known as "The Terrorist of Heisei". During his early career, Murakami split his time between NJPW and Battlarts to hone his skills as a wrestler. One of his first matches was at Wrestling World 2000, teaming with Ogawa in a losing effort to Shinya Hashimoto and Takashi Iizuka when he submitted to Iizuka. On April 7, Murakami took on Iizuka in an attempt to avenge his loss but he once again fell to Iizuka by submission. On May 5 at Wrestling Dontaku 2000, Murakami teamed with Ogawa to challenge Fighting Club G-Eggs (Yuji Nagata and Manabu Nakanishi) for the IWGP Tag Team Championship but lost when Murakami was pinned by Nagata.

In early 2001, Murakami would also wrestle several times for the newborn Pro Wrestling ZERO1, main eventing the promotion's second ever show where he and Ogawa lost to Mitsuharu Misawa and Takeshi Rikio. Murakami became known for his wild, seemingly uncontrollable style of wrestling, predominately made up of punches, kicks, and legitimate judo/MMA throws and submissions, with very little actual wrestling moves in his moveset. In August 2001, Murakami entered the 2001 G1 Climax, his first time ever competing in the tournament. He finished fourth in his block with 5 points scoring victories over Nakanishi and Tadao Yasuda while going to a double countout with eventual winner, Yuji Nagata.

In early 2002, Murakami joined NJPW full time, and in the summer, Murakami joined the heel stable Makai Club, where he was considered one of the highest-ranking members behind only Tadao Yasuda. On December 10, 2002, Murakami challenged Yuji Nagata for the IWGP Heavyweight Championship. Despite making Nagata bleed and trapping him in his own finishing move, the Nagata Lock II, Murakami was defeated by Nagata.

At Wrestling World 2003, Murakami and Yasuda lost to Michiyoshi Ohara and Shinsuke Nakamura. The following month, Murakami teamed with Yasuda in a #1 Contenders Tournament for the IWGP Tag Team Championship, making it to the finals before losing to Mike Barton and Jim Steele. However, an injury to Steele would give the title shot to Murakami and Yasuda who unsuccessfully challenged Cho-Ten on February 16. Throughout much of 2003, Murakami and the rest of the Makai Club feuded with Michiyoshi Ohara's Crazy Dogs faction, and in March 2003, MMA fighter Enson Inoue was bought into New Japan to feud with Murakami. On May 2 at NJPW Ultimate Crush 2003, Murakami lost to Inoue in an extremely bloody match that ended in just 6 minutes. In the fall of 2003, Murakami began competing in a series of three "bounty" matches, where the winner would receive a cash prize from Makai Club leader Kantaro Hoshino. He defeated Shinya Makabe at Road to Ultimate Crush on September 21 in a 1,000,000 Yen Bounty match, then fellow Makai Club member Katsuyori Shibata at Ultimate Crush II on October 13 in a 2,000,000 Yen Bounty match, and finally Koji Kanemoto at Yokohama Dead Out on November 3 in a 4,000,000 Bounty match. In early 2004, Murakami began feuding with Hiroshi Tanahashi for the IWGP U-30 Openweight Championship, which eventually led to an empty arena steel cage match on March 28 at King of Sports, won by Tanahashi. On May 3, 2004, at Nexxess in the Tokyo Dome, Murakami teamed with Masahiro Chono to unsuccessfully challenge Yoshihiro Takayama and Minoru Suzuki for the IWGP Tag Team Championship. Makai Club broke up in the summer of 2004 and Murakami would briefly join Masahiro Chono's Black New Japan stable before leaving New Japan shortly after. His last match under contract to the promotion took place on July 7, where he, Katsuyori Shibata, Super Strong Machine, Mitsuya Nagai and Masahiro Chono defeated Hiroyoshi Tenzan, Osamu Nishimura, Shinya Makabe, Yuji Nagata and Yutaka Yoshie. Murakami would return to New Japan for a one-off match at the 2006 Tokyo Dome show, losing to Yuji Nagata.

=== Big Mouth Loud (2005–2006) ===
Having both left New Japan, Murakami and Katsuyori Shibata announced the formation of a new promotion, Big Mouth Loud in January 2005. Backed by Fumihiko Uwai, the promotion was set to focus largely on shoot-style, and would use talent from other promotions as well as their own contracted wrestlers. At Big Mouth Loud's first show in September 2005, Murakami defeated Shibata in the main event. Murakami reignited his feud with Enson Inoue at the next show in December 2005, defeating him in a singles match. Murakami continued to compete for BML until the promotion's closure in mid-2006.

=== Freelance (2006–2007) ===
After Big Mouth Loud folded, Murakami went freelance and began working for Pro Wrestling Zero1 in the summer of 2006. Murakami took part in ZERO1's 2006 Fire Festival tournament, making it to the semi-finals before losing to Shinjiro Otani. He also debuted for Pro Wrestling Noah, taking part in a tournament for the GHC Tag Team Championship alongside Shinjiro Otani. They reached the semi-finals before losing to eventual winners Takeshi Morishima and Muhammad Yone. Murakami was also pinned by Mitsuharu Misawa in their only singles match in October. In the first match of the 2007 Fire Festival, Murakami suffered a severe brain injury against Shinjiro Otani, which forced him to leave professional wrestling effective immediately to undergo brain surgery.

=== Return (2010–2014) ===
In February 2010 Murakami returned to pro wrestling, as Big Murakami, losing to Kensuke Sasaki in a match for Sasaki's Kensuke Office promotion. He also returned to Pro Wrestling Noah, and on March 26 teamed with Katsumi Usuda to challenge Takeshi Rikio and Muhammad Yone for the GHC Tag Team Titles but they came up short. Murakami later announced Kensuke Office as his home promotion, and continued to compete with the promotion until its closure in 2014.

=== Return in Noah (2020–) ===
On December 26 at Kongoh Produce ~ Diamond 3 Murakami made his return in Pro Wrestling Noah as NOSAWA Rongai announced his return to the company. On December 29 at Takashi Sugiura 20th Anniversary Show he fought in a 7 vs 7 match and his team, Takashi Sugiura, Kazushi Sakuraba, Kendo Kashin, NOSAWA Rongai, Kaz Hayashi, Daisuke Nakamura won by defeating the whole Kongoh led by Kenoh. On January 4, 2021, at Noah New Sunrise 2021 Sugiura-gun (Kazunari Murakami, Kazushi Sakuraba & Takashi Sugiura) defeat Kongoh (Katsuhiko Nakajima, Kenou & Masa Kitamiya) by referee's decision. On January 16, 2021, at Noah Higher Ground 2021 - Day 2 in another six-men tag team match Sugiura-gun (NOSAWA Rongai & Takashi Sugiura & Kazunari Murakami) defeat Kongo (Kenou, Manabu Soya & Tadasuke). By defeating three times in a row the Kongoh stable Murakami earned a title match against Kenou for the GHC National Title. On January 23, 2021, at the Noah Higher Ground 2021 - Day 3 show held at the EDION Arena Osaka Kenou retained the title.

== Mixed martial arts record ==
Professional record breakdown
10 matches	5 wins	5 losses
By knockout	1	4
By submission	3	1
By decision	1	0
By disqualification	0	0
Unknown	0	0
Draws	0	
No contests	0	

Res.	Record	Opponent	Method	Event	Date	Round	Time	Location	Notes
Win	5–5	Lee Young Gun	Submission (armbar)	Jungle Fight 1	September 13, 2003	1	1:09	Manaus, Amazonas, Brazil	
Loss	4–5	Wallid Ismail	TKO (punches)	UFO: Legend	August 8, 2002	2	3:03	Tokyo, Japan	
Loss	4–4	Masaaki Satake	TKO (punches)	PRIDE 10	August 27, 2000	1	6:58	Tokorozawa, Saitama, Japan	
Win	4–3	John Dixson	Submission (armbar)	PRIDE 1	October 11, 1997	1	1:34	Tokyo, Japan	
Loss	3–3	Maurice Smith	KO (punch)	Extreme Fighting 4	March 28, 1997	1	4:23	Des Moines, Iowa, United States	
Win	3–2	Bart Vale	TKO (punches)	Extreme Fighting 3	October 18, 1996	1	4:37	Tulsa, Oklahoma, United States	
Loss	2–2	Masanori Suda	Submission (armbar)	Lumax Cup: Tournament of J '96	March 30, 1996	2	1:38	Japan	
Win	2–1	Akihiro Gono	Decision	Lumax Cup: Tournament of J '96	March 30, 1996	2	3:00	Japan	
Win	1–1	Isamu Osugi	Submission (armlock)	Lumax Cup: Tournament of J '96	March 30, 1996	1	4:10	Japan	
Loss	0–1	Akihiro Gono	KO (head kick)	Lumax Cup: Tournament of J '95	October 13, 1995	1	2:25	Japan	

== Kickboxing record ==
Kickboxing record
0 wins, 1 loss
Date	Result	Opponent	Event	Location	Method	Round	Time	Record
December 31, 2003	Loss	(Germany) Stefan Leko	Inoki Bom-Ba-Ye 2003	Kobe, Japan	KO (right high kick)	1	1:08	0–1
Legend: Win Loss Draw/No contest
