= Black New Japan =

Professional wrestling stable

Stable
- Members: Masahiro Chono (leader); Manabu Nakanishi; Scott Norton; Black Strong Machine; Ryushi Yanagisawa; Mitsuya Nagai; Katsuyori Shibata; Kazunari Murakami; Togi Makabe; Toru Yano; Minoru Suzuki; Harry Smith; Don Frye
- Name: Black New Japan
- Debut: October 2004
- Disbanded: October 2005

Black New Japan was a professional wrestling stable that competed in New Japan Pro-Wrestling. Black New Japan was led by Masahiro Chono and was one of many of Chono's anti-New Japan stables.

== History ==
Black New Japan began around October 2004 following the 2004 G1 Climax when Masahiro Chono broke away from the New Japan army and turned heel creating a new anti-New Japan army. For his new army, Chono reunited with fellow nWo Japan and Team 2000 alumni Scott Norton, New Japan wrestler Manabu Nakanishi, & Makai Club alumni Makai #1 (later becoming Black Strong Machine), Katsuyori Shibata, Kazunari Murakami, Mitsuya Nagai, & Ryushi Yanagisawa. In their first tour, Black New Japan competed in two tournaments. The first was on October 17, 2004 where Nagai & Shibata teamed with former Makai Club member Ryota Chikuzen in the Yuko 6-man tag team tournament, where they defeated Hiro Saito, Tatsutoshi Goto, and Toru Yano in the semifinals but lost to Shinsuke Nakamura, Blue Wolf and Katsuhiko Nakajima. On October 24, Chono and Shibata entered President Hoshino's 10,000,000 Yen Tag Tournament defeating Genichiro Tenryu and Kensuke Sasaki in the semifinals but lost to Hiroyoshi Tenzan and Shinsuke Nakamura in the finals. At Chrono Stream: Masahiro Chono 20th Anniversary on November 3, 2004. Nagai (teaming with Masayuki Naruse) to defeat Tenryu and Masanobu Fuchi to win the All Asia Tag Team Championship, later in the night Nakanishi, Norton, and Don Frye (one night member) defeated Yutaka Yoshie, Blue Wolf, and Shinsuke Nakamura, Shibata lost to Toshiaki Kawada, and in the main event, Chono teaming with Riki Choshu defeated Tenzan and Yuji Nagata. For the Battle Final 2004 tour, Black New Japan formed an alliance with Jyushin Thunder Liger's stable C.T.U. On December 9, Black New Japan took part in a best of 7 series against New Japan but lost it 3–4.

In January 2005, Shibata and Murakami left New Japan & Black New Japan to join Big Mouth LOUD. At Toukon Festival: Wrestling World 2005 on January 4, 2005, Nakanishi and Nagai entered the 8 Ultimate Royal Tournament where Nagai lost to Dolgorsürengiin Sumyaabazar while Nakanishi defeated Toru Yano in the first round but lost to Ron Waterman in the semifinals. Later in the night, Chono won a dogfight against Choshu and Tenzan. In February 2005, Harry Smith and Minoru Suzuki joined Black New Japan and the group would take part in several matches against the New Japan Army. On the first show on January 23, Smith defeated Hiro Saito, Nagai made a successful All Asia Tag Title defense, and Nakanishi & C.T.U.'s Minoru Tanaka defeated Tenzan and Koji Kanemoto. On January 26, Black New Japan and the New Japan Army went to battle. C.T.U. leader Jyushin Thunder Liger defeated Katsushi Takemura while Koji Kanemoto and Wataru Inoue defeated Jado and Gedo to even things and the New Japan Army won a single elimination match. On February 2, Nagai lost the All Asia Tag Title in All Japan to Bull Buchanan and Rico. On February 20, Black New Japan would win a single elimination match against the New Japan Army. On March 13, Nakanishi and Norton challenged Hiroshi Tanahashi and Shinsuke Nakamura for the IWGP Tag Team Championship but lost. Following the tag title match, Nakanishi left Black New Japan to join Yujia Nagata's Team JAPAN, around the same time, Togi Makabe and Toru Yano joined the group. On June 4, 2005, Scott Norton challenged Hiroyoshi Tenzan for the IWGP Heavyweight Championship but came up short. In June 2005, Yano and Smith entered a tournament for the IWGP U-30 Openweight Championship. Smith would finish with 4 points while Yano became a runner-up losing to Hiroshi Tanahashi in the finals.

In July 2005, Black New Japan (along with Team JAPAN and C.T.U.) would engage in several matches with New Japan Army members. On July 1, the first series would go to a tie with Black and New Japan each getting 3 wins. Another series took place on July 17 with Black New Japan winning 4–1. In August 2005, Chono, Suzuki, Yano, and Makabe would enter the 2005 G1 Climax. Makabe would finish last in Block B with 0 Points due to injury while Yano finished in 7th place with 4 points in Block B. Suzuki would finish in 5th place with 6 points while Chono won Block A with 10 points. After defeating Shinsuke Nakamura in the semifinals, he would defeat Kazuyuki Fujita to win his 5th G1 Climax. Two months after the G1, Chono challenged Fujita for the IWGP Heavyweight Championship in a three way (also involving Brock Lesnar) at Toukon Souzou New Chapter on October 8, but lost to the match after he was pinned by Lesnar. Following Toukon Souzou, Riki Choshu returned to power in New Japan and disbanded several stables including Black New Japan.

== Championships and accomplishments ==
- All Japan Pro Wrestling
  - All Asia Tag Team Championship (1 time) - Nagai and Masayuki Naruse
- New Japan Pro-Wrestling
  - G1 Climax (2005) - Chono
