= Cho-Ten =

Professional wrestling tag team

Tag team
- Members: Masahiro Chono; Hiroyoshi Tenzan
- Name(s): Cho-Ten; Masahiro Chono and Hiroyoshi Tenzan; Ookami Gundan
- Billed heights: Chono: 1.85 m (6 ft 1 in); Tenzan: 1.83 m (6 ft 0 in)
- Combined billed weight: 223 kg (492 lb)
- Billed from: Japan
- Debut: February 1995
- Disbanded: September 2006

Cho-Ten, also known as Ookami Gundan (Japanese for "Wolf Army"), was a professional wrestling tag team who competed in New Japan Pro-Wrestling (NJPW) intermittently from February 1995 to September 2006. The team consisted of Masahiro Chono and Hiroyoshi Tenzan. Cho-Ten is one of the most decorated and successful tag teams in New Japan history. They held the IWGP Tag Team Championship five times and won the 1995 Super Grade Tag League.

== History ==
=== Team Wolf (1995–1998) ===
Cho-Ten first began teaming up on February 19, 1995 along with veteran Hiro Saito to defeat Hiroshi Hase, Kensuke Sasaki, & Riki Choshu. After forming their alliance, the three became known as "Team Wolf"; Sabu would join Team Wolf as well. Cho-Ten would see immediate success as they received their first shot at the IWGP Tag Team Championship on June 12, 1995 as they took on Shinya Hashimoto and Junji Hirata for the vacant titles. Cho-Ten would emerge victorious and would win their first tag team title. The title reign would not last long as they stripped of the titles on July 7, 1995 when Chono no-showed a title defense, it would later be revealed that Chono missed the show due to his father's death. After being stripped of the titles, Cho-Ten would challenge for the titles 3 times during 1995 but came up short each time. Despite this setback Cho-Ten would bounce back as they won the 1995 Super Grade Tag League marking their second achievement in less than a year.

After several months out of the title hunt, Cho-Ten received a title shot against Kazuo Yamazaki and Takashi Iizuka on July 16, 1996. The challengers came out on top winning their second tag title. After the title victory, Cho-Ten would successfully defend the titles against Yamazaki and Iizuka in rematches before eventually dropping the titles to Tatsumi Fujinami and Kengo Kimura at Wrestling World 1997 on January 4, 1997. After the title loss, Cho-Ten briefly broke up with Chono forming nWo Japan (which Tenzan joined), afterward he would form teams with nWo Sting and Keiji Mutoh, the latter which he won the IWGP Tag Team Title and the 1997 Super Grade Tag League. During 1997, both Chono and Tenzan received shots at the IWGP Heavyweight Championship but both failed to win the title and Tenzan also became the runner up in the 1997 G1 Climax.

On May 7, 1998, Chono and Mutoh were stripped of the tag team titles due to Mutoh suffering from a knee injury. Following the vacancy, Cho-Ten reunited and on June 5, 1998 they defeated Genichiro Tenryu and Shiro Koshinaka to win the titles for the third time. The title reign would not last as they lost the titles on July 15, 1998 to Tenryu and Koshinaka in a rematch. After the title loss, Cho-Ten broke up again as Chono began focusing on singles competition while Tenzan formed another highly successful tag team: Tencozy with Satoshi Kojima.

=== Cho-Ten (2002–2006) ===
In 2002, Keiji Mutoh, Satoshi Kojima, and Kendo Kashin left New Japan for All Japan Pro Wrestling. With Mutoh gone, the IWGP Tag Team Championships became vacated and Kojima departure marked the end of Tencozy for the moment. In March 2002, Cho-Ten reunited to take part in a tournament for the vacant titles, the team would defeat Kensuke Sasaki and Shiro Koshinaka in the first round, Hiroshi Tanahashi and Kenzo Suzuki in the second round and on March 24, 2002, Cho-Ten took on Yuji Nagata and Manabu Nakanishi in the finals for the titles. Despite not having teamed in years, the magic was still there as Cho-Ten won their fourth tag title. The fourth title reign would be Cho-Ten's most successful title reign as they would hold the titles for over 446 Days which has become the longest title reign in the history of the titles, they also made the most successful title defenses as they successfully defended the titles 7 times against the likes of The Steiner Brothers and variations of the Makai Club (Tadao Yasuda and Ryushi Yanagisawa, Yasuda and Kazunari Murakami). During the title reign, Chono won his fourth G1 Climax on August 11, 2002 adding more trophies to the team. Eventually the team would lose the titles on June 13, 2003 to Hiroshi Tanahashi and Yutaka Yoshie. After the title loss, Cho-Ten broke up once again as both decided to focus on their singles careers with Tenzan winning the IWGP Heavyweight Championship 4 times between 2003–2005 and the 2003 and 2004 G1 Climax while Chono won the 2005 G1.

On October 30, 2005, Cho-Ten reunited once again to challenge Hiroshi Tanahashi and Shinsuke Nakamura for the IWGP Tag Team Championship. History would be made as Cho-Ten won their record setting fifth tag title. It was during this reign that Chono and Tenzan finally adopted the Cho-Ten portmanteau as their official team name. They would hold the titles for nearly a year fending off challenges from Takao Omori and Shiro Koshinaka, Yuji Nagata and Naofumi Yamamoto, and Manabu Nakanishi and Giant Bernard. Unfortunately during the title reign, Chono would suffer an injury and upon his return, the two would begin to show dissension and eventually had a falling-out. Due to their refusal to defend the title together, Cho-Ten were stripped of the tag titles on September 24, 2006, and began feuding from there.

=== Aftermath ===
After breaking up, Chono and Tenzan began feuding with each other with Tenzan defeating Chono on September 24, 2006. Soon after Chono formed Chono-Nakamura gun/BLACK with Shinsuke Nakamura while Tenzan formed GBH (Great Bash Heel) and the feud continued. After Tenzan was eventually kicked out of GBH in February 2008, the two began to make peace as they began teaming up again in tag matches. Despite teaming again, Cho-Ten never officially got back together as Tenzan instead began re-teaming with Kojima as well began suffering numerous injuries.

In February 2010, Chono left New Japan to become a Freelancer. Tenzan future was unknown as he had been inactive since August 2009 due to injuries, until returning to New Japan in November 2010.

In October 2011, Chono and Tenzan reunited, alongside Hiro Saito, for Tenzan's 20th Anniversary Show, defeating Osamu Nishimura, Shinjiro Otani, and Koji Kanemoto.

== Championships and accomplishments ==
- New Japan Pro-Wrestling
  - IWGP Heavyweight Championship (5 times) – Chono (1), Tenzan (4)
  - IWGP Tag Team Championship (5 times)
  - G1 Climax (2002, 2005) – Chono
  - G1 Climax (2003, 2004) – Tenzan
  - Super Grade Tag League (1995)
- Tokyo Sports
  - Tag Team of the Year (1995)
  - Tag Team of the Year (1996) – with Hiro Saito
