= Makai Club =

Professional wrestling stable

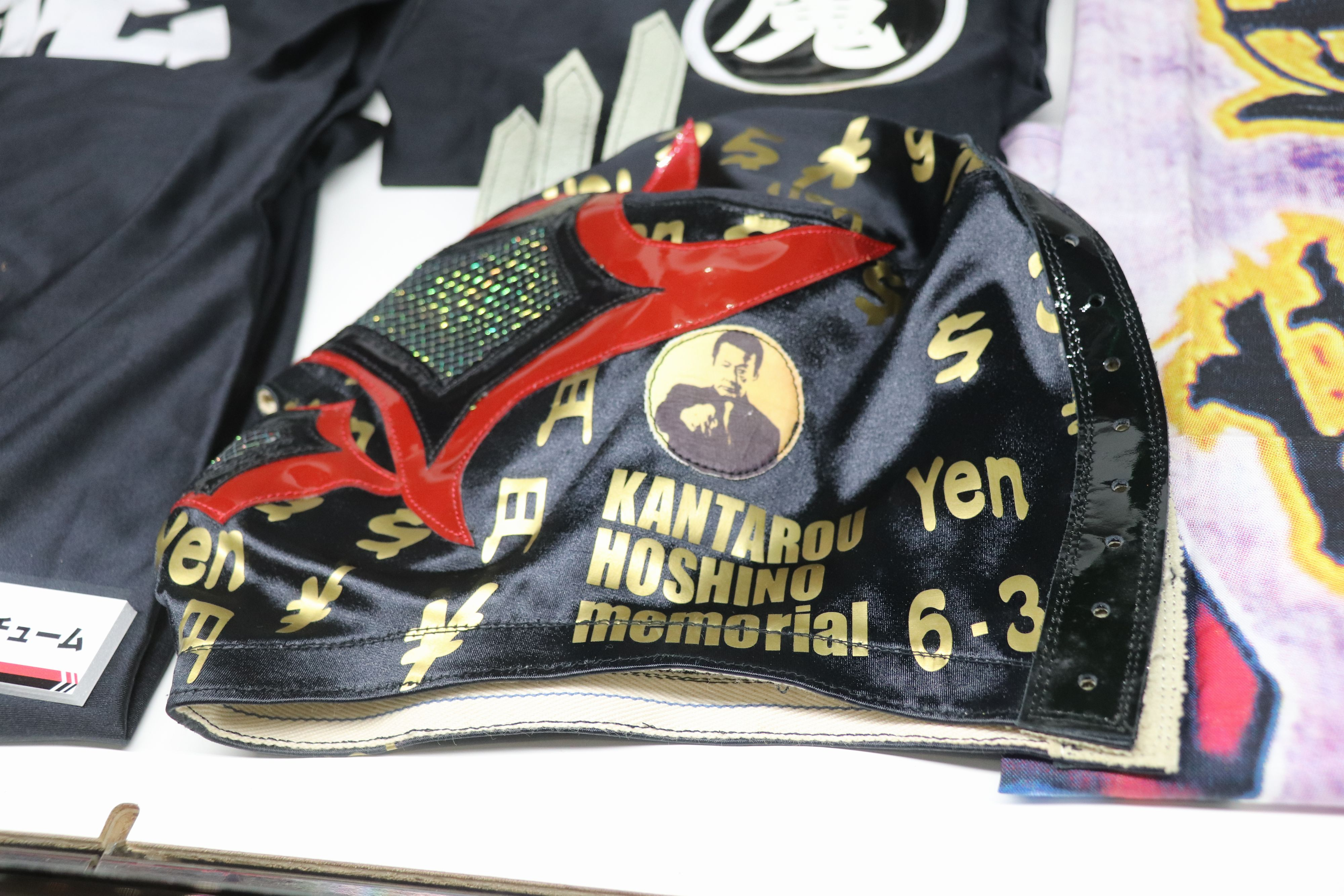
- Mask associated with the Makai Club, displayed at a Tokyo Dome City exhibit in Japan

Stable
- Members: See below
- Debut: 2002
- Disbanded: 2004

Makai Club (魔界倶楽部, Makai Kurabu), originally Puroresu Kessha Makai Club (プロレス結社魔界倶楽部, Puroresu Kessha Makai Kurabu; Pro Wrestling Association Hell Club), was a villainous professional wrestling stable that competed in New Japan Pro-Wrestling. It was led by Tadao Yasuda and managed by Kantaro Hoshino, and its gimmick was that of a group of mixed martial arts fighters and pro wrestlers who worshipped Antonio Inoki as a god.

It also had influence over All Japan Women's Pro-Wrestling, where it had an extension called Makai Majo Gundan (魔界魔女軍団, Makai Majo Gundan; Hell Witch Army) which was led by Chiyo Obata.

== History ==
Makai Club first formed in the summer of 2002 during New Japan's G1 Climax when Antonio Inoki's crown wrestler Tadao Yasuda sent three masked men against Masahiro Chono. One of the masked men would reveal himself as MMA fighter: Ryushi Yanagisawa, while the other two were Makai #1 (Junji Hirata, the original Super Strong Machine) and Makai #2 (in the form of Ryota Chikuzen).

The group's first tour was the September 2002 G1 World Tour which they dominated and would go 13–3 on the entire tour and would also go on to add a new member in Kazunari Murakami. Makai Club would continue to enjoy success as the group added another member in Makai #3, who was actually Michiyoshi Ohara. The group also would go on to win a three match 5 vs. 5 series against New Japan which gave Hoshino the chance to name challengers for the IWGP Titles. Following the G1 World Tour, the Club would go on a slump for the remainder of the year. In November 2002, Yasuda, Yanagisawa, and Makai #1 entered the 2002 Triathlon Survivor League but finished in last place with 1 point. Then on December 10, 2002, Yasuda and Yanagisawa challenged Cho-Ten for the IWGP Tag Team Championship, but lost, and later in the night, Murakami challenged Yuji Nagata for the IWGP Heavyweight Championship but he also came up short.

Makai Club bounced back at Wrestling World 2003. Yanagisawa won the Young Generation Cup defeating Kenzo Suzuki in the semi-finals and Yutaka Yoshie in the finals. Meanwhile, Makai #1 and one night only member, Dai Majin, defeated Hiro Saito and Tatsutoshi Goto. The new members Makai #4 (being Young Lion Katsuyori Shibata) and Makai #5 (former All Japan Pro Wrestling competitor Mitsuya Nagai) defeated Takashi Iizuka and Masahito Kakihara. The group would suffer one loss with Yasuda and Murakami losing to their former Makai #3 partner Ohara and Shinsuke Nakamura. On February 1, 2003, Makai Club entered the Teisen Hall Six-Man Tag Team Tournament with Yanagisawa, Makai #1, and Makai #2 forming one team, while Kazunari Murakami, Makai #4 and #5 formed another team. However neither team would win with, as both teams lost to eventual winners Shinsuke Nakamura, Hiro Saito, and Tatsutoshi Goto. Also in February, Makai Club entered a #1 contenders tournament for the IWGP Tag Team Championship. On January 30, Makai #1 and #2 lost an entrance match to Saito and Goto, Makai #4 and #5 lost in the first round to Iizuka and Kakihara on February 6, and Yasuda and Murakami would make it to the finals where they lost to Mike Barton and Jim Steele. Despite the loss, Yasuda and Murakami would ultimately be granted the title match after Steele suffered an injury a few days later. On February 16, 2003, Yasuda and Murakami challenged Cho-Ten for the IWGP Tag Titles but would fail to win the titles, and in the main event, Yanagisawa challenged Yoshihiro Takayama for the NWF Heavyweight Championship, but lost. By the spring, the group began a feud with the Crazy Dogs (Tatsutoshi Goto, Hiro Saito, Michiyoshi Ohara and Enson Inoue) and Makai #5 began a feud with Takashi Iizuka, who recognized him as Nagai (who got him injured in June 2001) with Iizuka defeating him in a best of series (with Nagai even unmasking for the final match). On April 23, 2003, Yasuda challenged Yuji Nagata for the IWGP Title in a rematch from a year ago (where Nagata won the title from Yasuda), but Yasuda lost. At Ultimate Crush on May 2, 2003, Ken Shamrock joined the Makai Club for one night defeating Takashi Iizuka, while Murakami lost to Enson Inoue. Following Ultimate Crush, Makai Club for the most part of the year, went to the midcard and would only receive a few more title shots afterwards. On July 9, 2003, Makai #4 and #5 challenged Hiroshi Tanahashi and Yutaka Yoshie for the IWGP Tag Team Championship, but came up short. On July 13, Yasuda challenged Takayama for the NWF Heavyweight Championship, but he also came up short. Yasuda and Shibata, who abandoned his Makai #4 profile, entered the 2003 G1 Climax, with Shibata finishing third, while Yasuda finished last in their block. In the fall of 2003, Makai #2 and #5 unmasked and began going by their real names, also during this time Yasuda and Makai #1 entered the 2003 G1 Tag League finishing in 5th place with 7 points.

At Wrestling World 2004, Makai #1, Yanagisawa, Nagai and Chikuzen defeated The Crazy Dogs in the forms of Ohara, Goto, Saito and Inoue, while Yasuda lost to Masayuki Naruse twice (firstly by disqualification, and secondly by KO after a sleeper hold), and Murakami and Shibata lost to Josh Barnett and Takashi Iizuka. One of the group's last big moments occurred in February 2004, when Yasuda took part in a tournament for the vacated IWGP Heavyweight Championship but he would lose to Yuji Nagata in the first round. The Club would remain for only a few more months until Yasuda left New Japan in the summer of 2004, ending the Makai Club.

== Members ==
=== First incarnation ===
- Kantaro Hoshino (executive president)
- Tadao Yasuda (leader)
- Kazunari Murakami
- Ryushi Yanagisawa
- Ken Shamrock
- Bob Sapp (one night member)
- Makai No. 1 / Junji Hirata
- Makai No. 2 / Ryota Chikuzen
- Makai No. 3 / Michiyoshi Ohara
- Makai No. 4 / Katsuyori Shibata
- Makai No. 5 / Mitsuya Nagai
- Makai No. 18 / Daisuke Miura (special guest)
- Makai No. 21 and No. 22 / Yuzu (special guests)
- Makai Heat / Madoka
- Makai X / Hiroshi Nagao
- Dai Majin / Giant Silva
- Giant Majin / Michael Jarvi

=== Makai Majo Gundan ===
- Chiyo Obata (executive president)
- Amazing Kong
- Makai Majo No. 1 (Kaoru Ito)
- Makai Majo No. 2 (Hiromi Yagi)
- Makai Majo No. 3 (Hikaru)

== Championships and accomplishments ==
- New Japan Pro-Wrestling
  - IWGP Heavyweight Championship (2002) – Tadao Yasuda
  - Young Generation Cup (2003) – Ryushi Yanagisawa
