= Kotetsu Yamamoto =

Japanese wrestler, referee, and color commentator

Personal information
- Born: Masaru Yamamoto (山本 勝, Yamamoto Masaru); October 30, 1941 Yokohama, Kanagawa Prefecture, Japan
- Died: August 28, 2010 (aged 68) Karuizawa, Nagano Prefecture, Japan
- Cause of death: hypoxic encephalopathy

Professional wrestling career
- Ring name(s): Kotetsu Yamamoto; Little Yamaha
- Billed height: 1.68 m (5 ft 6 in)
- Billed weight: 100 kg (220 lb)
- Trained by: Rikidozan; Antonio Inoki
- Debut: July 19, 1963
- Retired: April 4, 1980 (full time); December 18, 2008 (Last Match)

Masaru Yamamoto (山本 勝, Yamamoto Masaru; October 30, 1941 – August 28, 2010), known by his ring name Kotetsu Yamamoto (山本小鉄, Yamamoto Kotetsu) was a Japanese professional wrestler, referee, and color commentator for New Japan Pro-Wrestling. He was named "Kotetsu" ("Little Iron") by former Japanese pro wrestler Toyonobori after the famous knight, Aizu-No-Kotetsu. Originally a wrestler, Yamamoto was mostly known for his tag team the Yamaha Brothers with Kantaro Hoshino but made his biggest mark as a trainer in the New Japan Dojo having helped train Keiji Mutoh, Jushin Thunder Liger, Minoru Suzuki, Shinsuke Nakamura, and Masahiro Chono among others.

== Professional wrestling career ==
After graduating from high school, Yamamoto trained as a bodybuilder at a local YMCA while working for the then blossoming steel industry in Japan. In 1962, he was discovered by Rikidozan and trained as his last ever student. After Rikidozan died, he became the "tsukebito" or trainee of Antonio Inoki.

During January 1967, he along with Kantaro Hoshino were sent to the United States to gain experience. While there, the two became known as The Yamaha Brothers. They appeared at NWA Mid-America where Yamamoto won his first championship, when he and Hoshino defeated Bad Boy Hines and Billy Hines on August 3, 1967, to win the NWA Mid-America Southern Tag Team Championship but only held the titles for a week as they lost them to Bad Boy Hines and Len Rossi on August 10. He returned to Japan the same year. On May 2, 1969, he defeated Gorilla Monsoon gaining one of the largest upset victories of the time in less than 5 minutes. When Antonio Inoki was expelled from the JWA, Yamamoto went along with Inoki and helped start New Japan Pro-Wrestling. Along with Antonio Inoki and Karl Gotch, Yamamoto is said to be responsible for the fundamentals of the Japanese "strong style".

Yamamoto also participated in the first three New Japan World Leagues from 1974 to 1976. He placed 5th in his block with 3.5 points in 1974, 8th place with 8 points in 1975, and last place with zero points in 1976. He also took part in New Japan's Pre-Japanese Championship tournament but again finished last with 0 points.

By 1979, Yamamoto reunited with Hoshino at International Wrestling Enterprise where they defeated Animal Hamaguchi and Great Kusatsu to win the IWA World Tag Team Championship on January 21, 1979. They held the titles for a month before losing them to Hamaguchi and Mighty Inoue on February 23.

== Post-retirement ==
In 1980, Yamamoto retired from Professional Wrestling as an active competitor. After that, he became a color commentator, coach, and referee for New Japan Pro-Wrestling until his death. He spent most of his retirement as a trainer in the New Japan Dojo where he helped train some of the greatest names in New Japan history including Yoshiaki Fujiwara, inventor of the legendary "Fujiwara armbar", the legendary Jyushin Thunder Liger, and modern wrestlers like Shinsuke Nakamura, Togi Makabe, Toru Yano and many more.

Despite retiring, Yamamoto would occasionally return to the ring from time to time including a nine-man NJPW Alumnus Battle Royal on May 1, 2003, which he co-won with Hoshino. On March 6, 2007, 35 years to the day of New Japan's first show, Yamamoto would be one of the inaugural inductees into the NJPW Greatest Wrestlers Hall of Fame. His final match would be on December 18, 2008, teaming with Hoshino against Great Kabuki and Great Kojika which went to a time limit draw.

== Death ==
Yamamoto died on August 28, 2010, due to a hypoxic encephalopathy. He was 68 years old. His passing came three months before long time tag team partner Kantaro Hoshino who died on November 25.

== Championships and accomplishments ==
- International Wrestling Enterprise
  - IWA World Tag Team Championship (1 time) – with Kantaro Hoshino
- New Japan Pro-Wrestling
  - NJPW Greatest Wrestlers (Class of 2007)
  - New Japan Alumnus Battle Royal (2003) – with Kantaro Hoshino
- NWA Mid-America
  - NWA Mid-America Southern Tag Team Championship (1 time) – with Kantaro Hoshino
- Tokyo Sports
  - Effort Award (1974)
  - Lifetime Achievement Award (1979, 2010)
