= Kantaro Hoshino =

Zainichi Korean wrestler (1943–2010)

Personal information
- Born: Yeo Geon-bu (여건부); October 9, 1943 Kobe, Hyogo, Japan
- Died: November 25, 2010 (aged 67)

Professional wrestling career
- Ring name(s): Kantaro Hoshino; Great Yamaha
- Billed height: 1.70 m (5 ft 7 in)
- Billed weight: 95 kg (209 lb)
- Trained by: Rikidōzan
- Debut: December 22, 1961
- Retired: February 19, 1995 (full-time); December 22, 2008 (last match)

Kantaro Hoshino (星野 勘太郎, Hoshino Kantarō; October 9, 1943 – November 25, 2010), born Yeo Geon-bu (여건부), was a Japanese born, Korean professional wrestler, manager, and promoter best known for his time in New Japan Pro-Wrestling. As a wrestler, he was half of The Yamaha Brothers team along with Kotetsu Yamamoto. As a manager, he co-led the heel stable Makai Club, with Tadao Yasuda.

== Professional wrestling career ==
Hoshino began his wrestling career after previously attempting a professional boxing career. He was trained by the father of Puroresu: Rikidozan. Using the name Kantaro Hoshino, he wrestled his debut match on December 22, 1961, against Atsuhide Koma (Masio Koma, future NWA World Middleweight Champion). The godfather of the ring name is Toyonobori.

Over the next few years, Hoshino worked his way up the card and paid his dues. In 1967, he was sent on a learning visit to the United States with fellow up and comer Kotetsu Yamamoto, with the two forming the tag team: the Yamaha Brother with Hoshino using the name "Great Yamaha". While in America, Hoshino enjoyed championship success. On August 3, 1967, the Yamaha Brothers won the AWA Southern Tag Team Championship. They would hold the titles for a week before losing them on August 10 to Bad Boy Hines and Len Rossi. Nine days later, Hoshino won the NWA Southern Junior Heavyweight Championship, he would hold the title until August 31.

By the end of the decade Hoshino returned to the JWA. In 1970, Hoshino teamed with Antonio Inoki in the first NWA World Tag League tournament which they won defeating Nick Bockwinkel and John Quinn in the finals. Hoshino was also the first opponent of Mexico's Mil Máscaras in Japan.

Following the JWA closing in 1973, Hoshino jumped to New Japan Pro-Wrestling where he remained for the rest of his career. By the mid-1970s, he and Yamamoto reformed the Yamaha Brothers team, although going individually by their Japanese ring names instead of their American gimmicks.

On January 21, 1979, The Yamaha Brothers entered the International Wrestling Enterprise and defeated Animal Hamaguchi and Great Kusetsu to win the IWA World Tag Team Championship. They would hold the titles for a month before dropping them to Hamaguchi and Mighty Inoue on February 23.

In 1980, Yamamoto retired from wrestling, ending the Yamaha Brothers. Hoshino spent the remainder of his in-ring career in the low to midcard, rarely competing for championships or tournaments, only winning the Six-Man Tag Team Cup League with Antonio Inoki and Riki Choshu on December 7, 1988, after the trio defeated Tatsumi Fujinami, Masahiro Chono and Shinya Hashimoto to win the cup. Hoshino would only wrestle with fellow young talents in tag and singles action for the remainder of his career, most notably against Jushin "Thunder" Liger, Norio Honaga and Shiro Koshinaka. After a few more years of wrestling, Hoshino retired on February 19, 1995, wrestling Osamu Kido to a 10-minute draw.

== Retirement and death ==
After retiring Hoshino continued to work with New Japan as a promoter where he help promote New Japan shows in Kobe. In 2002, Hoshino returned to New Japan as a co-leader of the stable Makai Club. During his time in the Makai Club, Hoshino would earn some popularity with New Japan fans with his "BISSHIBISSHI" catchphrase. On May 1, 2003, Hoshino returned to the ring in a 9-man New Japan alumnus Battle Royal which he co-won with former partner: Kotetsu Yamamoto. After the Makai Club broke up in 2004, Hoshino would hold a President Hoshino 10,000,000 Yen Offer Tag Tournament which was won by Hiroyoshi Tenzan and Shinsuke Nakamura.

On March 6, 2007, Hoshino would become one of the first inductees in the NJPW Greatest Wrestlers Hall of Fame.

In late 2008, Hoshino returned to NJPW for one final program. On December 7, he helped No Limit (Tetsuya Naito and Yujiro) defeat Gedo and Jado to retain their IWGP Junior Heavyweight Tag Team Championship, which led to his last match on December 22, 47 years to the day after he debuted, where he defeated Gedo in a street fight.

On February 4, 2009, Hoshino suffered a stroke and his health declined until his death on November 25, 2010, due to pneumonia. He was 67 years old.

== Championships and accomplishments ==
- International Wrestling Enterprise
  - IWA World Tag Team Championship (1 time) - with Kotetsu Yamamoto
- Japan Wrestling Association
  - 1st Annual Tag League (1970) - with Antonio Inoki
- NWA Mid-America
  - NWA Southern Tag Team Championship (1 time) - with Kotetsu Yamamoto
  - NWA Southern Junior Heavyweight Championship (1 time)
- New Japan Pro-Wrestling
  - NJPW Six Man Tag Team Cup League (1988) - with Riki Choshu and Antonio Inoki
  - NJPW Greatest Wrestlers (Class of 2007)
  - New Japan Alumnus Battle Royal (2003) - with Kotetsu Yamamoto
- Tokyo Sports
  - Lifetime Achievement Award (2010)
  - Service Award (1995)
  - Technique Award (1977)
