= Tadao Yasuda =

Japanese rikishi and professional wrestler (1963–2026)

Takanofuji Tadao
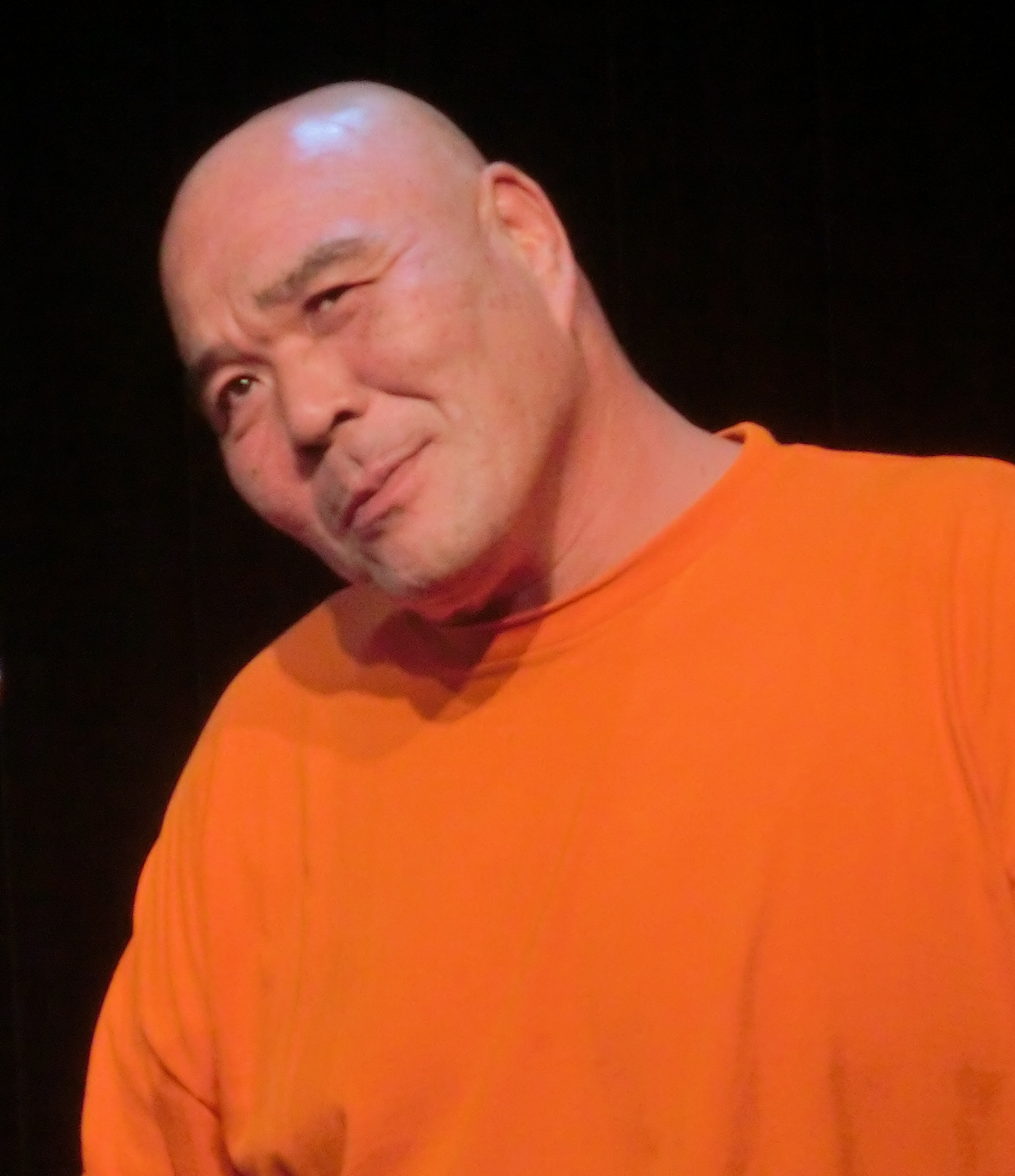
- Yasuda in 2018

Personal information
- Native name: 孝乃富士 忠雄
- Born: October 9, 1963 Tokyo, Japan
- Died: February 8, 2026 (aged 62) Tokyo, Japan
- Height: 1.91 m (6 ft 3 in)
- Weight: 150 kg (331 lb)

Sport
- Sport: Sumo
- Retired: May, 1992
- Heya: Kokonoe
- Record: 418-459-4
- Debut: March, 1979
- Highest rank: Komusubi (July, 1990)
- Special Prizes: Fighting Spirit (1)
- Gold Stars: 2 (Futahaguro)
- Updated on August 2007

Tadao Yasuda (安田 忠夫, Yasuda Tadao; October 9, 1963 – February 8, 2026) was a Japanese sumo wrestler (rikishi), professional wrestler and mixed martial artist. Known as the "Debt King", he competed in sumo from 1979 to 1992 under the shikona of Takanofuji Tadao (孝乃富士 忠雄), achieving the rank of komusubi. After his retirement from sumo, he turned to professional wrestling, in which he competed from 1994 to 2011, most notably in New Japan Pro-Wrestling (NJPW), where he was a one-time IWGP Heavyweight Champion. He also fought in mixed martial arts from 2001 to 2003, holding a notable win over Jérôme Le Banner.

== Sumo career ==
Yasuda made his professional sumo debut in March 1979 at the age of 15, after leaving junior high school. He was recruited by Kokonoe stable. In 1980 he adopted the shikona ring name of Fujinomori, before switching to Takanofuji in 1984. He first reached sekitori status in March 1985 upon promotion to the second highest jūryō division, but could manage only 4 wins against 11 losses and was demoted back to the unsalaried makushita division. After winning promotion back to jūryō in January 1986 he made his debut in the top makuuchi division only two tournaments later in May 1986.

Takanofuji was ranked in the top division for 33 tournaments, winning one special prize for Fighting Spirit. His two gold stars for defeating yokozuna were both earned against Futahaguro (who, as Koji Kitao, also turned to professional wrestling). Takanofuji had the advantage of belonging to a stable that included two yokozuna, Chiyonofuji and Hokutoumi, which under sumo regulations meant he never had to face them in tournament play. However, his height of 1.92 m (6 ft 3 1/2 in) meant he had a higher centre of gravity than was ideal for a sumo wrestler, and he seemed to struggle when promoted above the mid maegashira ranks. Though he managed to reach the fourth highest komusubi ranking in July 1990 he could not maintain the rank, winning only two bouts there. He was demoted from the top division after the September 1991 tournament and announced his retirement in May 1992. His career coincided exactly with that of his stablemate Hokutoumi, who made his debut alongside him in March 1979 and also retired in May 1992. At Takanofuji's own request, it was the previous head of Kokonoe stable, ex-yokozuna Kitanofuji, his long-time coach, and not his successor, ex-yokozuna Chiyonofuji, who performed the topknot cutting at Takanofuji's official retirement ceremony or danpatsu-shiki.

=== Fighting style ===
Takanofuji's most common winning kimarite were yori-kiri (force out), hataki-komi (slap down) and tsuki-otoshi (thrust over).

== Professional wrestling career ==
Tadao Yasuda
Personal information
- Born: October 9, 1963 Tokyo, Japan
- Died: February 8, 2026 (aged 62) Tokyo, Japan

Professional wrestling career
- Ring name(s): Tadao Yasuda; Yasudakinen
- Billed height: 1.93 m (6 ft 4 in)
- Billed weight: 130 kg (290 lb)
- Trained by: Kensuke Sasaki; Shinya Hashimoto; Hiroshi Hase; Antonio Inoki; Genichiro Tenryu
- Debut: February 24, 1994
- Retired: February 4, 2011

Reverting to his real name, he joined the New Japan Pro-Wrestling (NJPW) promotion in June 1993, making his debut in February 1994. Even though he was a sumo wrestler before, he did not received the same usual special treatment that other sumo champions Hiroshi Wajima in All Japan and Koji Kitao in New Japan received when both also started in professional wrestling. This was mostly because of the issues behind the reasons they joined the sport and how it end up bad for them, as Wajima used professional wrestling to settle his enormous gambling debts, and Kitao engaged in various confrontations with professional wrestling promoters due to being called out for his lazy habits and bad attitude. With that being said, New Japan made Yasuda start from the absolute bottom, presenting him as a young lion instead of a celebrity with past sumo champion status, a decision Yasuda humbly agreed upon.

He spent the majority of the 1990s as an undercard wrestler, primarily competing in opening matches or as the fall guy in tag team matches with wrestlers such as Shinya Hashimoto and Kensuke Sasaki, achieving little success. In late 2000, Yasuda, along with Kazuyuki Fujita, became somewhat of a pet project for Antonio Inoki, and both of them were sent to the United States to train in mixed martial arts. Yasuda returned to Japan soon after, and was victorious in his first fight against veteran Masaaki Satake at Pride 13. Yasuda's win helped further legitimise him as a pro wrestler in the eyes of Inoki, and this was rewarded with Yasuda reaching the semi-finals of the 2001 G1 Climax, where he lost to Keiji Mutoh. After earning one win and one loss in MMA throughout 2001, Yasuda earned the biggest win of his career in December by choking out veteran Jerome Le Banner. His defeat of Jerome led to Yasuda's stock in New Japan skyrocketing almost overnight, and Yasuda soon found himself elevated from over the hill veteran to top title contender in early 2002. Yasuda earned the biggest win of his pro wrestling career on February 16, defeating Yuji Nagata in a tournament to win the vacant IWGP Heavyweight Championship.

Yasuda held the title for 48 days, before dropping it to Nagata in April. In August 2002, Yasuda and Kantaro Hoshino formed their own faction, the Makai Club, a group of wrestlers primarily with MMA backgrounds who worshipped Antonio Inoki like a god. Yasuda was viewed as the leader of the group, and in early 2003 he partnered up with his second in command Kazunari Murakami to enter the IWGP Tag Team Championship #1 Contender Tournament. Despite losing to Jim Steele and Mike Barton in the final, an injury to Steele would give the title shot to Murakami and Yasuda who unsuccessfully challenged Hiroyoshi Tenzan and Masahiro Chono on February 16. Having retired from MMA, the aging Yasuda's position in the New Japan card began to fall again, and in late 2004 he left the promotion. After leaving New Japan, he started making sporadic appearances for ZERO-ONE and Hustle.

In October 2007 he reportedly attempted to commit suicide by carbon monoxide poisoning, using a yeontan. A friend however, interrupted the alleged attempt. He was hospitalized with fears of possible brain damage, but this proved not to be the case and he eventually made a return to wrestling. Speaking to Tokyo Sports Yasuda later denied attempting suicide, saying the poisoning was accidental. On January 11, 2011, Yasuda announced his retirement from professional wrestling. He wrestled his final match on February 4, 2011, in which he was defeated by Genichiro Tenryu.

== Mixed martial arts career ==
Though very past his prime physically, Yasuda made his transition to mixed martial arts as a NJPW representative in March 2001. He had his debut at the PRIDE 13 against similarly retired kickboxer and karate champion Masaaki Satake. Yasuda received damage and bled from his face, but he nullified most of Satake's attacks by rushing him through sumo techniques against the ropes every time they were separated. In the end, the unanimous decision was given to Yasuda for controlling the fight.

Yasuda returned to MMA in the K-1 Andy Hug Memorial event, taking on Rene Rooze in a special rules match, but he lost via head kick KO at the third round. He would be more successful in December 2001, when he fought popular K-1 player Jerome Le Banner at an Inoki Bom-Ba-Ye event: Yasuda managed to take him down and submit him by pressing his forearm against Le Banner's throat, getting the biggest win of his MMA career.

He would later lose to fellow NJPW wrestler Kazuyuki Fujita in a Universal Fighting-Arts Organization event. Yasuda then fought superheavyweight kickboxer Jan Nortje, but he had to retire from the match when he hurt a leg seriously. His last fight was a rematch against Rooze, losing the fight again, this time by TKO.

== Personal life and death ==
Yasuda's daughter Ayami was born in 1987 and is a model.

Yasuda was found dead at his home in Tokyo, on February 8, 2026, at the age of 62.

== Championships and accomplishments ==
- Hustle

- Hustle Hardcore Hero Championship (1 time, final)
- Hustle Super Tag Team Championship (1 time, inaugural) – with Genichiro Tenryu
- Hustle King Hashimoto Memorial Six-Man Tag Tournament (2006) – with Masato Tanaka and Shinjiro Otani

- New Japan Pro-Wrestling

- IWGP Heavyweight Championship (1 time)
- IWGP Heavyweight Championship Tournament (2002)

- Pro Wrestling Illustrated

- PWI ranked him #150 of the 500 best singles wrestlers of the year in the PWI 500 in 2002

== Sumo career record ==
Takanofuji Tadao
Year	January Hatsu basho, Tokyo	March Haru basho, Osaka	May Natsu basho, Tokyo	July Nagoya basho, Nagoya	September Aki basho, Tokyo	November Kyūshū basho, Fukuoka
1979	x	(Maezumo)	West Jonokuchi #7; 3–2–2	West Jonokuchi #8; 5–2	West Jonidan #87; 3–4	East Jonidan #99; 5–2
1980	East Jonidan #64; 3–4	West Jonidan #83; 4–3	East Jonidan #56; 5–2	West Jonidan #17; 1–6	West Jonidan #49; 3–4	West Jonidan #59; 5–2
1981	West Jonidan #17; 5–2	West Sandanme #73; 3–4	West Sandanme #86; 7–0–P	East Makushita #58; 1–6	West Sandanme #21; 3–4	West Sandanme #32; 4–3
1982	East Sandanme #18; 5–2	East Makushita #53; 3–4	East Sandanme #6; 4–3	West Makushita #53; 3–4	West Sandanme #12; 6–1	West Makushita #38; 4–3
1983	West Makushita #31; 5–2	East Makushita #18; 3–4	East Makushita #31; 4–3	West Makushita #21; 4–3	West Makushita #16; 3–4	East Makushita #27; 2–5
1984	West Makushita #43; 6–1	East Makushita #19; 5–2	East Makushita #9; 4–3	West Makushita #5; 2–5	East Makushita #20; 6–1	West Makushita #6; 5–2
1985	West Makushita #1; 5–2	West Jūryō #10; 4–11	West Makushita #6; 5–2	West Jūryō #13; 6–9	West Makushita #4; 4–3	West Makushita #2; 6–1
1986	West Jūryō #9; 9–6	West Jūryō #2; 9–6	East Maegashira #14; 8–7	East Maegashira #10; 8–7	West Maegashira #3; 4–11 ★	West Maegashira #9; 8–7
1987	West Maegashira #5; 6–9	East Maegashira #9; 8–7	East Maegashira #5; 5–10	West Maegashira #9; 9–6	West Maegashira #1; 3–12 ★	East Maegashira #9; 8–7
1988	West Maegashira #2; 3–12	West Maegashira #9; 8–5–2	East Maegashira #5; 7–8	West Maegashira #6; 8–7	West Maegashira #1; 2–13	West Maegashira #12; 9–6
1989	East Maegashira #6; 8–7	East Maegashira #3; 3–12	East Maegashira #10; 8–7	West Maegashira #7; 6–9	East Maegashira #11; 9–6	West Maegashira #4; 7–8
1990	East Maegashira #5; 9–6	West Maegashira #1; 2–13	East Maegashira #9; 11–4; F	East Komusubi #1; 2–13	West Maegashira #9; 8–7	East Maegashira #4; 6–9
1991	East Maegashira #7; 8–7	West Maegashira #2; 1–14	East Maegashira #15; 8–7	East Maegashira #11; 5–10	East Maegashira #15; 7–8	East Jūryō #3; 8–7
1992	West Jūryō #2; 6–9	East Jūryō #6; 6–9	East Jūryō #10; Retired; 4–11	x	x	x
Record given as wins–losses–absences Top division champion Top division runner-up Retired Lower divisions Non-participation Sanshō key: F=Fighting spirit; O=Outstanding performance; T=Technique Also shown: ★=Kinboshi; P=Playoff(s); Divisions: Makuuchi — Jūryō — Makushita — Sandanme — Jonidan — Jonokuchi Makuuchi ranks: Yokozuna — Ōzeki — Sekiwake — Komusubi — Maegashira

== Mixed martial arts record ==
Professional record breakdown
6 matches	2 wins	4 losses
By knockout	0	3
By submission	1	1
By decision	1	0

Res.	Record	Opponent	Method	Event	Date	Round	Time	Location	Notes
Loss	2–4	Rene Rooze	TKO (punches)	Inoki Bom-Ba-Ye 2003	December 31, 2003	1	0:50	Kobe, Japan	
Loss	2–3	Jan Nortje	TKO (injury)	Inoki Bom-Ba-Ye 2002	December 31, 2002	2	0:57	Saitama, Japan	
Loss	2–2	Kazuyuki Fujita	Submission (arm triangle choke)	Universal Fighting-Arts Organization: Legend	August 8, 2002	1	2:46	Tokyo, Japan	
Win	2–1	Jérôme Le Banner	Submission (forearm choke)	Inoki Bom-Ba-Ye 2001	December 31, 2001	2	2:50	Saitama, Japan	
Loss	1–1	Rene Rooze	KO (kick)	K-1 Andy Memorial 2001 Japan GP Final	August 19, 2001	3	0:09	Saitama, Japan	
Win	1–0	Masaaki Satake	Decision (split)	Pride 13 - Collision Course	March 25, 2001	3	5:00	Saitama, Japan	

== See also ==
- Glossary of sumo terms
- List of komusubi
- List of past sumo wrestlers

Vacant Title last held by Kazuyuki Fujita	30th IWGP Heavyweight Champion; February 16, 2002 – April 5, 2002	Succeeded by Yuji Nagata
