= Shinsuke Nakamura =

Japanese professional wrestler (born 1980)

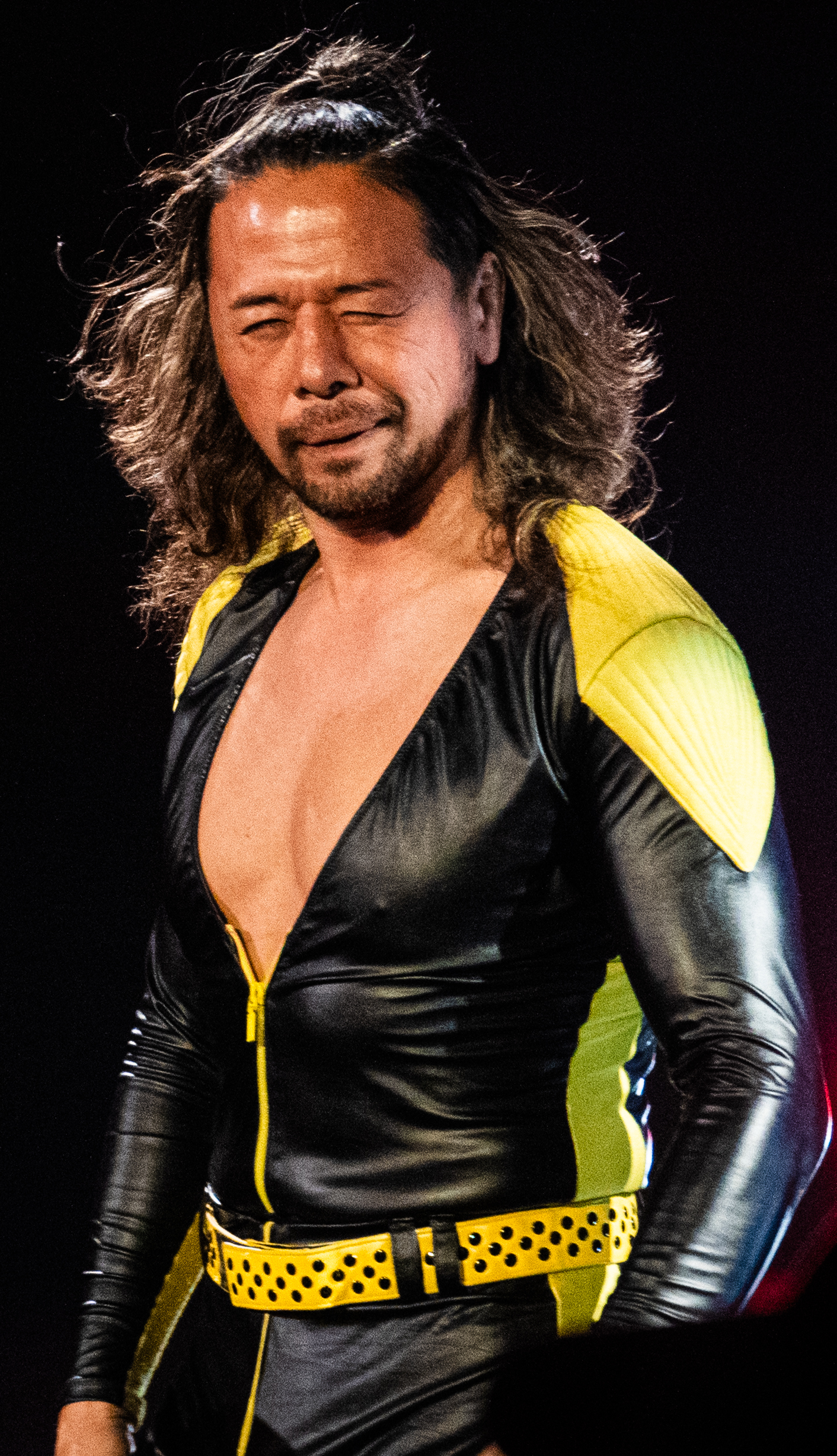
- Nakamura in 2024

Personal information
- Born: Shinsuke Nakamura; February 24, 1980 (age 46) Kyōtango, Kyōto, Japan

Professional wrestling career
- Ring names: Banzai; King Nakamura; Nakamura; Shinsuke Nakamura
- Billed height: 6 ft 2 in (188 cm)
- Billed weight: 229 lb (104 kg)
- Billed from: Kyoto, Japan
- Trained by: Antonio Inoki; Inoki Dojo; Kotetsu Yamamoto; Osamu Kido
- Debut: August 29, 2002

Shinsuke Nakamura (Japanese: 中邑 真輔, Hepburn: Nakamura Shinsuke; born February 24, 1980) is a Japanese professional wrestler and former mixed martial artist. As of January 2016, he is signed to WWE, where he performs on the SmackDown brand and is one-half of Bakusai alongside Kyoki.

Nakamura is also known for his time in New Japan Pro-Wrestling (NJPW), where he is a former 3-time IWGP Heavyweight Champion, with his first reign coming at the age of 23 years and 9 months; making Nakamura the youngest IWGP Heavyweight Champion at the time. His other accomplishments within the company include winning the 2011 G1 Climax and the 2014 New Japan Cup, and being the final IWGP Third Belt Champion, the final NWF Heavyweight Champion, and the longest reigning IWGP Intercontinental Champion for his first reign (he formerly held the record for most reigns at five). He is also a founding member and the original leader of the stable Chaos.

Prior to his main roster debut in WWE, Nakamura competed in the company's NXT brand, where he became a two-time NXT Champion. In January 2018, Nakamura won the 2018 Men's Royal Rumble match and lost at WrestleMania 34 and later won the WWE United States Championship three times. He won the Intercontinental Championship for the first time in 2019 at Extreme Rules, making him the second wrestler (behind Chris Jericho) to hold both WWE and IWGP Intercontinental Championships. Nakamura is also a former WWE SmackDown Tag Team Champion with Cesaro. From July 2021 to October of the same year, Nakamura dubbed himself King Nakamura due to being in possession of the King of the Ring crown, although he never won the tournament, instead defeating reigning King of the Ring Baron Corbin in a "Battle for the Crown" match. Overall, Nakamura is a five-time world champion and a seven-time intercontinental champion in professional wrestling.

== Early life ==
Shinsuke Nakamura was born in Kyōtango, Kyoto, on February 24, 1980. Growing up Nakamura would watch Jackie Chan movies which lead to him garnering an interest martial arts and eventually pro wrestling. As a child, his favorite wrestler was Jushin Liger. Nakamura competed in wrestling during high school, and later attended Aoyama Gakuin University, where he was also a member of the collegiate wrestling team, and earned a degree in economics. In 2021, he revealed on Renee Paquette's podcast that he was inspired to become a professional wrestler because he “wanted to be a man”, adding that “wrestlers work almost every day”, believing that it would help toughen himself up.

== Professional wrestling career ==
=== New Japan Pro-Wrestling (2002–2016) ===
==== Super Rookie (2002–2005) ====
Nakamura joined NJPW in March 2002 and quickly began making a name for himself as a bright prospect for the company. In his debut match on August 29, 2002 he lost to Tadao Yasuda. Having earned the nickname "Super Rookie", Nakamura impressed both NJPW officials and fans with an excellent combination of strength, speed, and technical skill. Alongside fellow rookies Hiroshi Tanahashi and Katsuyori Shibata, Nakamura became known as one of the "new Three Musketeers". On December 9, Nakamura defeated Hiroyoshi Tenzan for the IWGP Heavyweight Championship, thus becoming the youngest wrestler in history to win the title. His record was broken in 2026, when Callum Newman won the title. On January 4, 2004, at Wrestling World 2004, Nakamura successfully defended the IWGP Heavyweight Championship against the NWF Heavyweight Champion Yoshihiro Takayama in a title unification match. However, Nakamura was forced to vacate the title due to an injury just a month later.

Upon his return, Nakamura received a shot at the title at Nexess on May 3, now held by Bob Sapp, but lost to the defending champion. On December 11, Nakamura and his tag team partner Hiroshi Tanahashi defeated Kensuke Sasaki and Minoru Suzuki in a decision match to win the IWGP Tag Team Championship. On January 4, 2005, at Toukon Festival: Wrestling World 2005, Nakamura defeated his own tag team partner to win the IWGP U-30 Openweight Championship. During their tag team title reign, the two left for an excursion to Mexico, where they feuded with Los Guerreros del Infierno and defended the IWGP Tag Team Championship against Rey Bucanero and Olímpico. On October 30, they lost the IWGP Tag Team Championship to Cho-Ten (Hiroyoshi Tenzan and Masahiro Chono).

==== Excursion and return (2006–2009) ====
At Toukon Shidou Chapter 1 on January 4, 2006, Nakamura challenged Brock Lesnar for the IWGP Heavyweight Championship, but lost. In March 2006, Nakamura announced that he would depart on a learning excursion to further improve his wrestling skills. He would also travel to Mexico, Brazil and Russia and train with Lesnar at Lesnar's personal gym to gain muscle mass. NJPW President Simon Inoki later suggested that as part of his learning excursion, Nakamura would be loaned to World Wrestling Entertainment (WWE) to gain experience in working large American shows. However, it was mostly speculation and never came to pass as Nakamura was urgently needed back in New Japan due to Lesnar's departure.

On September 24, Nakamura made his long-awaited return to New Japan, joining Masahiro Chono's Black New Japan faction, which had the goal of reforming New Japan with Chono as the president and Nakamura as the "ace". Nakamura had greatly improved his muscular mass during his overseas training and also debuted a new finisher, called the Landslide. On December 10, Nakamura was unable to win the IWGP Heavyweight Championship from then-champion Tanahashi and was again unsuccessful on January 4, 2007, at the Wrestle Kingdom in Tokyo Dome show, where he lost to Toshiaki Kawada. Nakamura entered the 2007 G1 Climax tournament, where he reached the semi-finals before dislocating his shoulder. The injury sidelined Nakamura for months, but he made his return on November 11 and took over the leadership of Black New Japan from Chono and reformed the faction under the new name RISE. The faction originally consisted of himself, Minoru, Milano Collection A.T., Hirooki Goto, Giant Bernard, Travis Tomko and Prince Devitt. Low Ki was later added to the stable after Milano was injured, having impressed Nakamura during an appearance when he was still with Impact! Wrestling (formerly TNA). On December 9, Nakamura defeated Togi Makabe to earn an IWGP Heavyweight Championship match at the following month's Tokyo Dome show.

On January 4, 2008, Nakamura defeated his rival Tanahashi in the main event of Wrestle Kingdom II in Tokyo Dome, winning the IWGP Heavyweight Championship for the second time. On February 17, Nakamura defeated Kurt Angle to win the IGF version of the IWGP Heavyweight Championship, unifying it with his own NJPW version of the title. He lost the IWGP Heavyweight Championship to All Japan Pro Wrestling (AJPW) representative Keiji Mutoh in Osaka on April 27.

On September 5, Nakamura and RISE stablemate Hirooki Goto unsuccessfully challenged Togi Makabe and Toru Yano for the IWGP Tag Team Championship. Immediately after the match, the duo were attacked by Giant Bernard, Rick Fuller and the returning Low Ki, who had just left RISE to join Makabe's GBH faction. On February 15, 2009, Nakamura faced Tanahashi for the IWGP Heavyweight Championship, but he failed to regain the title.

==== King of Strong Style (2009–2012) ====
In April 2009, Nakamura turned into a villain, siding with the former members of GBH (especially Toru Yano) in a feud against Togi Makabe and Tomoaki Honma. This new group was soon named Chaos with Nakamura as their leader. Nakamura began to work a much rougher style, using a lot of knees and continuing to use a straight right hand as a frequent move in addition to the Bomaye (renamed Kinshasa in WWE), his new finisher. It was the Bomaye that took him to the finals of the 2009 G1 Climax, where he lost to Makabe. Prior to the final, Nakamura had gone undefeated, winning each match with the Bomaye. The move was also credited for fracturing IWGP Heavyweight Champion Hiroshi Tanahashi's orbital bone in the semi-finals of the G1, which forced Tanahashi to vacate the title later that month.

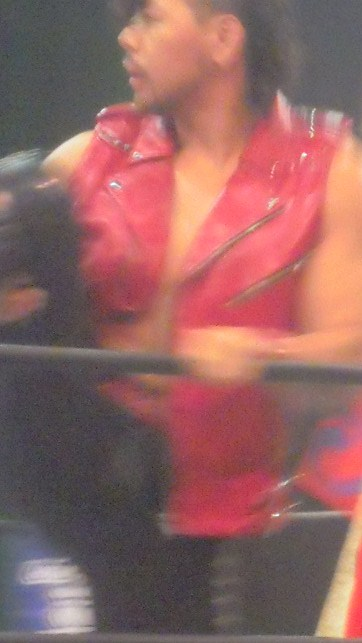
Nakamura in November 2011

On September 27, Nakamura avenged his G1 loss and defeated Makabe in a decision match to win the IWGP Heavyweight title for a third time. Upon winning the title, Nakamura drew the ire of Antonio Inoki by announcing his plan of wanting to restore the "Strong Style" of New Japan by capturing the original IWGP Heavyweight Championship belt from Inoki to replace the fourth generation title belt held by Nakamura. On October 12, Nakamura successfully defended the title against Shinjiro Otani. On November 8, at Destruction '09, Nakamura successfully defended the title against previous champion Hiroshi Tanahashi. On December 5, Nakamura retained the title by defeating Yuji Nagata. On January 4, 2010, at Wrestle Kingdom IV in Tokyo Dome, Nakamura successfully defended the IWGP Heavyweight Championship against Yoshihiro Takayama in a rematch of their 2004 Tokyo Dome title unification bout. Nakamura was then challenged by Manabu Nakanishi, whom he would pin on February 14 at New Japan's ISM show in Sumo Hall, making his fifth defense. On April 4, Nakamura made his sixth successful title defense against the 2010 New Japan Cup winner and former teammate Hirooki Goto and afterwards accepted Togi Makabe's challenge for the title. On May 3, at Wrestling Dontaku 2010, Nakamura lost the IWGP Heavyweight Championship to Makabe. Following the loss, Nakamura was sidelined with a shoulder injury until he returned on June 19 at Dominion 6.19, defeating Daniel Puder. Atsushi Sawada and Simon Inoki of IGF appeared at the show and seemed to eye up Nakamura after the match. On July 19, Nakamura lost to Makabe in a rematch for the IWGP Heavyweight Championship. The following month, Nakamura entered the 2010 G1 Climax, where he won four out of his seven-round robin stage matches, including one over eventual winner Satoshi Kojima, leading his block heading to the final day, where he wrestled Pro Wrestling Noah's Go Shiozaki to a 30-minute time limit draw and thus missed the finals of the tournament by a single point. The draw with Shiozaki led to a no time limit match at a Pro Wrestling Noah show on August 22, where Nakamura was defeated. Despite losing to Goto in a number one contender's match on October 11, Nakamura was hand-picked by new IWGP Heavyweight Champion Satoshi Kojima as his first challenger. The title match took place on December 11, which Nakamura lost.

On January 4, 2011, Nakamura avenged his loss to Go Shiozaki by defeating him in a singles match at Wrestle Kingdom V in Tokyo Dome. On May 3, Nakamura failed in his attempt to regain the IWGP Heavyweight Championship from Hiroshi Tanahashi. From late May to early June, Nakamura worked a tour with Mexican promotion Consejo Mundial de Lucha Libre (CMLL), whom New Japan had a working agreement with. On August 1, Nakamura entered the 2011 G1 Climax and after winning seven out of his nine-round robin stage matches finished first in his block to advance to the finals of the tournament. On August 14, Nakamura defeated Tetsuya Naito to win the 2011 G1 Climax and earn another shot at the IWGP Heavyweight Championship. Nakamura went on to challenge for the IWGP Heavyweight Championship on September 19, but he failed to recapture the title from Tanahashi. In the 2011 G1 Tag League, Nakamura teamed with Toru Yano as the Chaos Top Team, winning all five of their group stage matches, advancing to the semi-finals of the tournament with a clean sheet. On November 6, Nakamura and Yano were eliminated from the tournament in the semi-finals by the team of Lance Archer and Minoru Suzuki. On January 4, 2012, at Wrestle Kingdom VI in Tokyo Dome, the Chaos Top Team was defeated by Pro Wrestling Noah representatives Go Shiozaki and Naomichi Marufuji.

==== IWGP Intercontinental Champion (2012–2016) ====
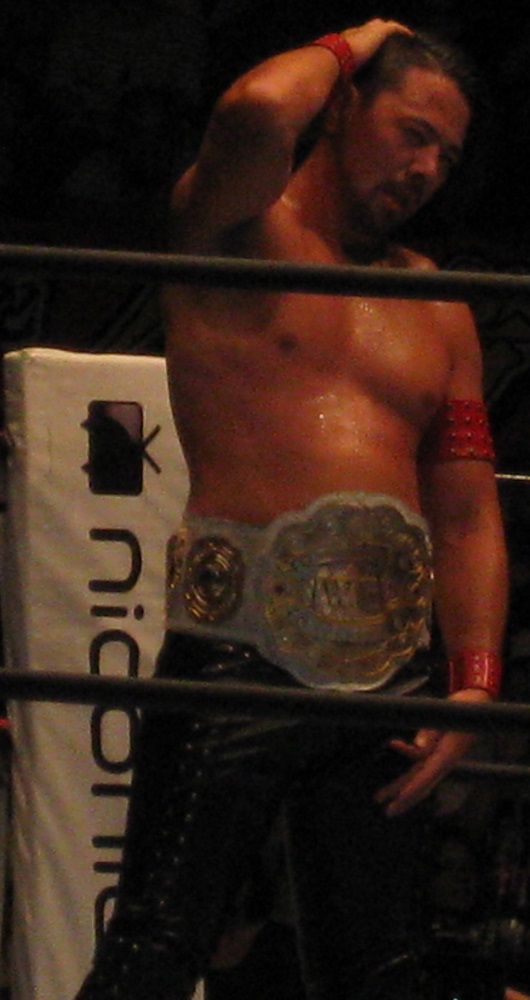
Nakamura in September 2013, during his second reign as the IWGP Intercontinental Champion

On July 22, Nakamura defeated Hirooki Goto to win the IWGP Intercontinental Championship for the first time. In August's 2012 G1 Climax tournament, Nakamura wrestled in the same block as fellow Chaos member and recent IWGP Heavyweight Champion Kazuchika Okada. The two stablemates faced each other on August 5, with Nakamura picking up the win, effectively solidifying his spot as the leader of Chaos. After four wins and three losses, Nakamura lost to Hiroyoshi Tenzan in the final day of the tournament and was eliminated from the finals, failing to defend his crown. On August 26, Nakamura traveled to the United States to make his first successful defense of the IWGP Intercontinental Championship, defeating Oliver John at a Sacramento Wrestling Federation (SWF) event in Gridley, California. The following day, Nakamura threw the ceremonial first pitch at a Major League Baseball game between the Texas Rangers and Tampa Bay Rays in Arlington, Texas. On October 8, at King of Pro-Wrestling, Nakamura successfully defended the title in a rematch against Hirooki Goto. On November 11, at Power Struggle, Nakamura made his third successful defense against Karl Anderson. From November 20 to December 1, Nakamura took part in the round-robin portion of the 2012 World Tag League, alongside stablemate Tomohiro Ishii under the tag team name Chaos Invincible. The team finished with a record of three wins, which included a win over stablemates Kazuchika Okada and Yoshi-Hashi as well as three losses, failing to advance from their block. On January 4, 2013, at Wrestle Kingdom 7 in Tokyo Dome, Nakamura defeated Kazushi Sakuraba for his fourth successful defense of the IWGP Intercontinental Championship. From January 18 to 19, Nakamura took part in the Fantastica Mania 2013 weekend, co-promoted by New Japan and CMLL. In the main event of the second night, Nakamura made his fifth successful defense of the title against La Sombra. In early 2013, Nakamura became involved in Chaos' rivalry with New Japan's other top villainous stable, Suzuki-gun. At New Japan's 41st anniversary event on March 3, Nakamura defeated Suzuki-gun's Lance Archer for his sixth successful defense. On April 5, Nakamura and Ishii unsuccessfully challenged KES (Archer and Davey Boy Smith Jr.) for the IWGP Tag Team Championship. Two days later at Invasion Attack, Nakamura successfully defended the IWGP Intercontinental Championship against Smith, avenging the previous loss from the first round of the New Japan Cup. On May 3, at Wrestling Dontaku 2013, Nakamura defeated Suzuki-gun's newest member Shelton X Benjamin for his eighth successful defense of the championship.

On May 11, Nakamura left for another tour with Mexican promotion CMLL. His first match back in Mexico took place the following day when he teamed with El Felino and Negro Casas in a six-man tag team two out of three falls match at Arena Coliseo, losing to Máscara Dorada, Rush and Titán. Nakamura quickly started a rivalry with La Sombra and after suffering two pinfall defeats in six-man tag team matches on April 17 and 24 accepted his challenge for the IWGP Intercontinental Championship, setting up a Fantastica Mania 2013 rematch between the two. On May 31, Nakamura lost the IWGP Intercontinental Championship to La Sombra, ending his reign at 313 days and eight successful title defenses. Nakamura wrestled his final match of the tour on June 9, losing to Rush. Nakamura returned to New Japan on June 22 at Dominion 6.22, where he and Tomohiro Ishii lost to Minoru Suzuki and Shelton X Benjamin, who pinned Nakamura for the win. On July 20, Nakamura regained the IWGP Intercontinental Championship from La Sombra, becoming the first multi-time holder of the title. From August 1 to 11, Nakamura took part in the 2013 G1 Climax. Finishing with a record of five wins and four losses, Nakamura narrowly failed to advance to the finals after losing to Benjamin on the final day. On September 29, at Destruction, Nakamura defeated Benjamin to make the first successful defense of his second reign as the IWGP Intercontinental Champion. His second successful defense took place on October 14 at King of Pro-Wrestling, when he defeated Pro Wrestling Noah representative Naomichi Marufuji. On November 9, at Power Struggle, Nakamura made his third successful title defense against Minoru Suzuki in a match which had the added stipulation that Nakamura would have had to join Suzuki-gun had he lost the title. Post-match, Nakamura nominated Hiroshi Tanahashi as his next challenger, setting up the first title match between the two longtime rivals in over two years. From November 23 to December 7, Nakamura and Ishii took part in the 2013 World Tag League, where they finished with a record of three wins and three losses, with a loss against Togi Makabe and Tomoaki Honma on the final day costing them a spot in the semi-finals.

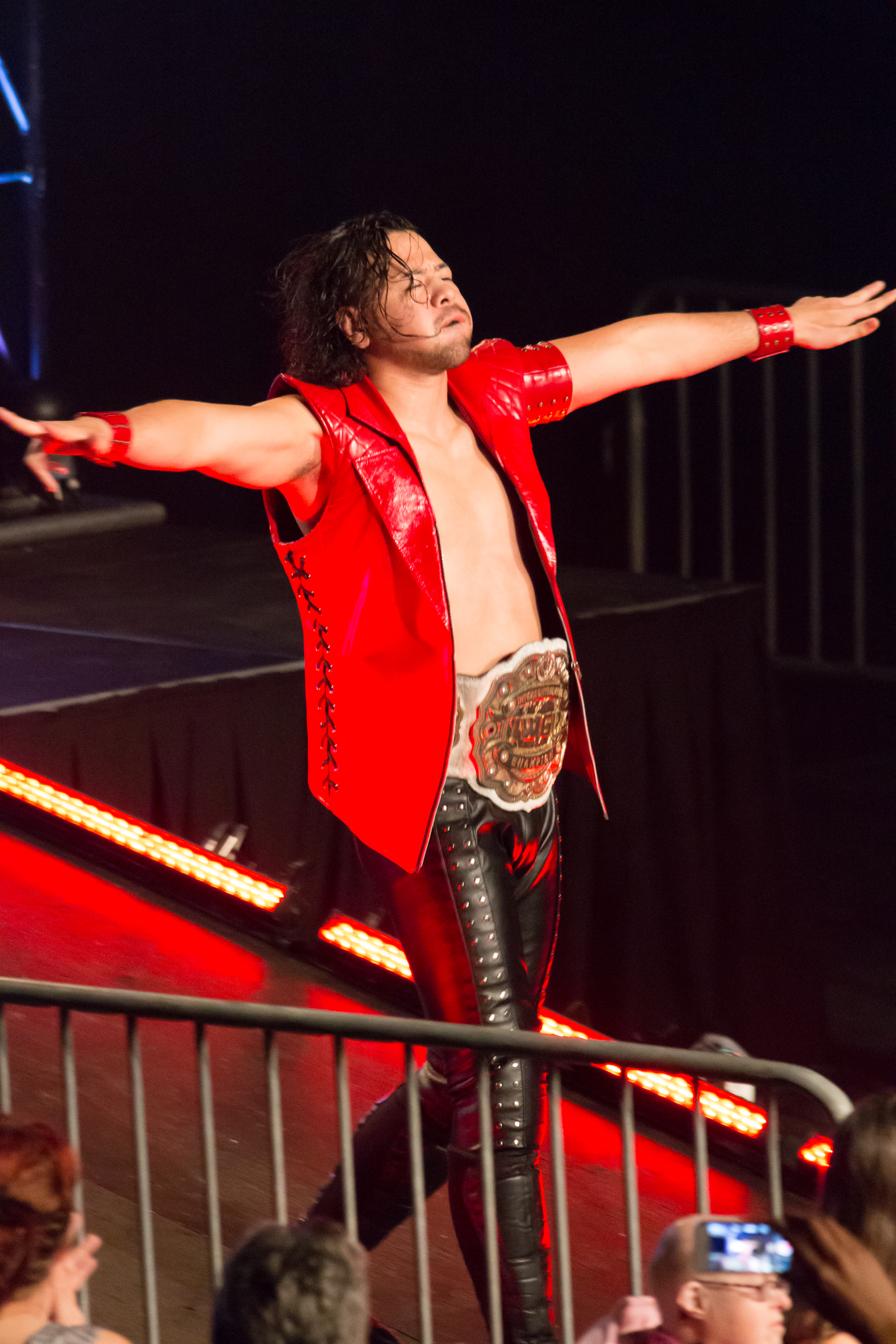
Nakamura as the IWGP Intercontinental Champion in May 2014

On January 4, 2014, Nakamura lost the IWGP Intercontinental Championship to Tanahashi in the main event of Wrestle Kingdom 8 in Tokyo Dome, and lost a rematch on February 9 at The New Beginning in Hiroshima. In March, Nakamura took part in the 2014 New Japan Cup, which he won, defeating Bad Luck Fale in the finals on March 23 and challenging Tanahashi to another rematch for the title. On April 6, at Invasion Attack 2014, Nakamura defeated Tanahashi to win the IWGP Intercontinental Championship for the third time. The following month, Nakamura took part in NJPW's North American tour, defeating Ring of Honor (ROH) wrestler Kevin Steen in an interpromotional match on May 17 at War of the Worlds. On May 25, at Back to the Yokohama Arena, Nakamura made the first successful defense of his third reign as the IWGP Intercontinental Champion against Daniel Gracie. On June 21, at Dominion 6.21, Nakamura lost the title to Bad Luck Fale in his second defense. In the 2014 G1 Climax, Nakamura won his block with eight wins and two losses, advancing to the finals on August 10, where he lost to Chaos stablemate Kazuchika Okada. On September 21, at Destruction in Kobe, Nakamura regained the IWGP Intercontinental Championship from Bad Luck Fale. He made his first successful title defense on November 8 at Power Struggle against Katsuyori Shibata. From November 23 to December 5, Nakamura took part in the 2014 World Tag League alongside Tomohiro Ishii. The team finished second in their block with a record of four wins and three losses, narrowly missing the finals of the tournament due to losing to Hirooki Goto and Katsuyori Shibata on the final day. On January 4, 2015, at Wrestle Kingdom 9 in Tokyo Dome, Nakamura made his second successful defense of the IWGP Intercontinental Championship against Kota Ibushi. His third defense took place on February 14 at The New Beginning in Sendai, where Nakamura defeated Yuji Nagata. On May 3, Nakamura's fourth title reign ended after losing to Goto at Wrestling Dontaku 2015, and he lost his rematch for the title on July 5 at Dominion 7.5 in Osaka-jo Hall.

From July 23 to August 15, Nakamura took part in the round-robin stage of the 2015 G1 Climax. Despite missing one match due to an elbow injury, Nakamura won his block and advanced to the finals by defeating reigning IWGP Heavyweight Champion and Chaos stablemate Kazuchika Okada in his last round-robin match, giving him a record of seven wins and two losses. On August 16, Nakamura was defeated in the finals of the tournament by Hiroshi Tanahashi. On September 27, at Destruction in Kobe, Nakamura defeated Hirooki Goto to win the IWGP Intercontinental Championship for the fifth time; this would remain the record for most reigns until Tetsuya Naito became a six-time champion in 2020. He made his first successful title defense on November 7 at Power Struggle against Karl Anderson. He made his second successful defense on January 4, 2016, by defeating A.J. Styles at Wrestle Kingdom 10 in Tokyo Dome. Hours after the event, it was reported that Nakamura had given his notice to NJPW on the morning of January 4, announcing that he was leaving the promotion for WWE. Nakamura remained under NJPW contract and was expected to finish off his contracted dates with the promotion before leaving. On January 12, NJPW confirmed Nakamura's upcoming departure, announcing he would also be stripped of the IWGP Intercontinental Championship. Nakamura handed in the title on January 25, officially ending his fifth reign. Nakamura wrestled his last match under his NJPW contract on January 30, where he, Kazuchika Okada and Tomohiro Ishii defeated Hirooki Goto, Hiroshi Tanahashi and Katsuyori Shibata.

Before Nakamura's departure from NJPW, ROH had announced that he would be appearing at their 14th Anniversary Show in Las Vegas as part of ROH's cross-promotion deal with NJPW, but ROH was forced to pull him from the event due to Nakamura signing an exclusive WWE contract.

=== Total Nonstop Action Wrestling (2008) ===
On January 28, 2008, Nakamura defeated Elix Skipper in a match taped for TNA Xplosion.

=== WWE (2016–present) ===
==== NXT Champion (2016–2017) ====
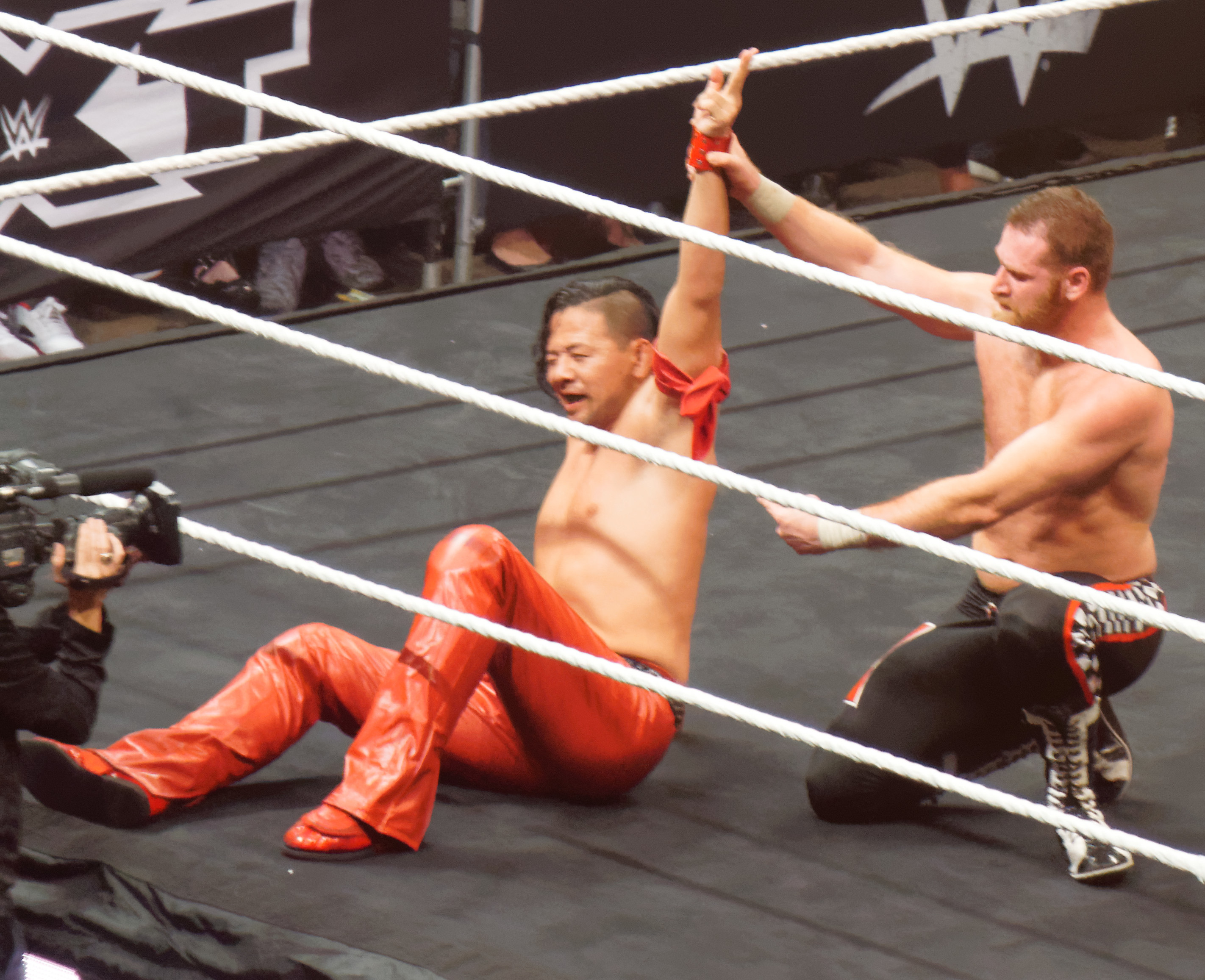
Nakamura and Sami Zayn after their match at NXT TakeOver: Dallas

On January 6, 2016, Nakamura confirmed in an interview with Tokyo Sports that he would be leaving NJPW at the end of the month and signing with WWE. On January 27, WWE officially announced that Nakamura would be taking part in the NXT TakeOver: Dallas event. On January 31, Nakamura was confirmed to have finished his NJPW commitments and was said to be reporting to the WWE Performance Center for training and handling logistical matters regarding his move to the company. On February 2, Nakamura arrived in Pittsburgh, Pennsylvania to undergo pre-contract signing medical tests. On February 22, WWE held a press conference in Tokyo, Japan to officially announce the signing of Nakamura to NXT. On April 1, Nakamura defeated Sami Zayn in his debut match at NXT TakeOver: Dallas. On the April 13 episode of NXT, Nakamura defeated Tye Dillinger in his NXT television debut.

On the May 25 episode of NXT, Austin Aries declared his intention to become the next NXT Champion, prompting a response from Nakamura, and NXT general manager William Regal scheduled a match between the two on June 8 at NXT TakeOver: The End, which Nakamura won. On the June 15 episode of NXT, Nakamura challenged former NXT Champion Finn Bálor to a match that was accepted and won by Nakamura on the July 13 episode of NXT. At NXT TakeOver: Brooklyn II on August 20, Nakamura defeated Samoa Joe to win his first NXT Championship. On November 19, at NXT TakeOver: Toronto, Nakamura lost the title to Joe in his first defense, marking his first televised loss in NXT. On the December 28 episode of NXT from Osaka, Japan, Nakamura would regain the NXT Championship from Joe. On the January 4, 2017, episode of NXT, he successfully defended the championship against Joe in a steel cage match, ending their feud.

At NXT TakeOver: San Antonio on January 28, Nakamura lost the NXT Championship to Bobby Roode. In his return match on March 8, Nakamura defeated T. J. Perkins and was put into a rematch to face Roode for the NXT Championship at NXT TakeOver: Orlando on April 1, but he was unsuccessful in reclaiming the championship. On the April 12 episode of NXT, Nakamura made his final NXT appearance, bidding farewell to the Full Sail University crowd.

==== Main roster beginnings (2017–2018) ====
On the April 4 episode of SmackDown Live following WrestleMania 33, Nakamura made his main roster debut, interrupting The Miz and Maryse following their promo mocking John Cena and Nikki Bella, officially joining the brand in the process. However, a feud never materialized as Miz and Maryse would move to Raw during the Superstar Shake-up. Nakamura would eventually have his first feud with Dolph Ziggler, culminating in a match at Backlash on May 21, where he won in his main roster in-ring debut. Nakamura was then announced as a competitor in the Money in the Bank ladder match at Money in the Bank. At the event on June 18, while Nakamura made his entrance, Baron Corbin attacked him with both a ladder and a camera. He was checked on by medical staff and carried out of the arena, but he later returned during the match and attacked all other participants, only to lose the match as Corbin retrieved the briefcase. At Battleground on July 23, Nakamura defeated Corbin by disqualification after Corbin attacked him with a low blow. Two nights later on SmackDown Live, Nakamura defeated Corbin in a rematch, ending their feud. On the August 1 episode of SmackDown Live, Nakamura defeated John Cena to earn a WWE Championship match against Jinder Mahal on August 20 at SummerSlam, which he lost after interference from The Singh Brothers, marking his first pinfall loss on the main roster. Nakamura defeated Randy Orton on the September 5 episode of SmackDown Live to earn a rematch for the WWE Championship at Hell in a Cell on October 8, but was again defeated. On November 19, at Survivor Series, Nakamura competed as part of Team SmackDown in the 5-on-5 Survivor Series elimination match, but was the first man eliminated by Braun Strowman, and his team lost to Team Raw. At Clash of Champions on December 17, Nakamura and Orton lost to Kevin Owens and Sami Zayn, who retained their jobs with Daniel Bryan and Shane McMahon serving as special guest referees.

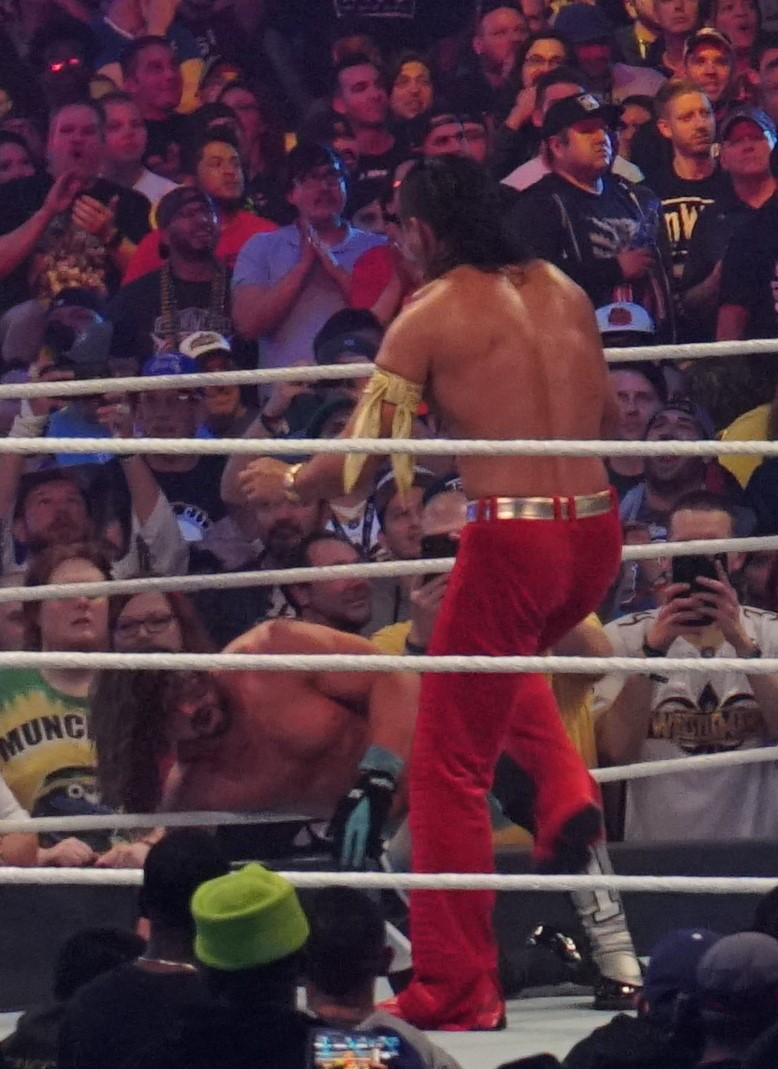
Nakamura attacking Styles after their match at WrestleMania 34

At the Royal Rumble on January 28, 2018, Nakamura entered the Royal Rumble match at number 14, which he won after last eliminating Roman Reigns. Immediately afterwards, Nakamura announced that he would challenge AJ Styles for the WWE Championship at WrestleMania 34. At the event on April 8, Nakamura lost to Styles; after the match, Nakamura attacked Styles with a low blow followed by a Kinshasa, turning heel in the process. On the following episode of SmackDown Live, Nakamura said in an interview that he got "too emotional" and was "sorry" for attacking Styles, but when asked to explain more, he sarcastically said "Sorry, no speak English". Later that night, Nakamura cemented his heel turn by attacking Styles and Daniel Bryan, low blowing Styles twice and striking Bryan in the back of the head with a Kinshasa. Over the following weeks, Nakamura continued to low blow Styles and received a rematch for the WWE Championship at the Greatest Royal Rumble on April 27, where Nakamura and Styles fought to a double count-out, with Styles retaining the title. Another rematch between the two was made for Backlash with a no disqualification stipulation added on the May 1 episode of SmackDown Live. At the event on May 6, Nakamura and Styles fought to a no contest after low blowing each other, with Styles again retaining the title. Looking for a decisive winner, SmackDown Commissioner Shane McMahon announced one more rematch between the two at Money in the Bank. Nakamura was granted the right to choose the stipulation for the match after defeating Styles on the May 15 episode of SmackDown Live, which he revealed the following week to be a Last Man Standing match after attacking Styles with a Kinshasa and giving him a 10-count. At the event on June 17, Nakamura failed to win the title, ending their feud. He then suffered a minor injury after a police dog bit his left leg.

==== United States Champion (2018–2019) ====
At Extreme Rules on July 15, Nakamura defeated Jeff Hardy by executing a low blow and Kinshasa to win the WWE United States Championship, his first title on the main roster. On August 19, Nakamura successfully defended the title against Hardy at SummerSlam. After refusing to defend the WWE United States Championship at the Hell in a Cell pay-per-view on September 16, general manager Paige ordered Nakamura to defend the championship on the September 18 episode of SmackDown Live, which he did successfully against Rusev. At SmackDown 1000, Nakamura lost to the returning Rey Mysterio in a qualifying match for the WWE World Cup at Crown Jewel. On November 2, he successfully defended the title against Rusev at Crown Jewel. At Survivor Series on November 18, Nakamura lost to Raw's WWE Intercontinental Champion Seth Rollins in an interbrand Champion vs Champion match. On the December 25 episode of SmackDown Live, Nakamura lost the United States Championship to Rusev, ending his reign at 156 days.

On January 27, 2019, at the Royal Rumble, Nakamura defeated Rusev to win his second United States Championship. Later that night, he participated in the Royal Rumble match, entering at #3, but was eliminated by Mustafa Ali. Two days later on SmackDown Live, Nakamura lost the title to R-Truth. Rusev then confronted Truth and pushed him into a title match, but Truth retained the title. After the match, Nakamura joined forces with Rusev into attacking Truth, starting an alliance between the two. At the Fastlane pre-show on March 2, Nakamura and Rusev were defeated by The New Day. At WrestleMania 35 on April 7, Nakamura and Rusev competed in a fatal four-way tag team match for the SmackDown Tag Team Championship, but lost.

==== The Artist Collective (2019–2021) ====
On July 14, at the Extreme Rules pre-show, Nakamura defeated Intercontinental Champion Finn Bálor to win the title for the first time in his career. This win made him the second man, after Chris Jericho, to have held both the IWGP and WWE Intercontinental Championship, as well as the first Asian-born wrestler to win the title. On July 27, he retained his title against Ali at Smackville. He then started an alliance with Sami Zayn, defeating The Miz with his help at Clash of Champions on September 15 to retain the title. At Crown Jewel on October 31, Nakamura was a member of Team Flair, losing to Team Hogan. At Survivor Series on November 24, Nakamura lost to NXT North American Champion Roderick Strong in an inter-brand triple threat match also involving Raw's United States Champion AJ Styles. On the November 29 episode of SmackDown, Nakamura and Zayn formed an alliance with Cesaro, thus forming a stable known as The Artist Collective. That same night, Nakamura and Cesaro failed to win the SmackDown Tag Team Championship from The New Day.

At Royal Rumble on January 26, 2020, Nakamura entered the Royal Rumble match at #11, but was eliminated by Brock Lesnar. On the January 31 episode of SmackDown, Nakamura lost the Intercontinental Championship to Braun Strowman, ending his reign at 201 days. At Elimination Chamber on March 8, Zayn, along with Nakamura and Cesaro, defeated Strowman in 3-on-1 handicap match for the title; Zayn won by pinning Strowman. Nakamura began teaming with Cesaro more frequently as they feuded with New Day for the SmackDown Tag Team Championship. On July 19, at The Horror Show at Extreme Rules, Nakamura and Cesaro defeated Kofi Kingston and Big E in a tables match to capture the titles. On the October 9 episode of SmackDown, they lost the titles to Kingston and Xavier Woods.

==== Championship pursuits (2021–2026) ====
On the January 8, 2021, episode of SmackDown, Nakamura competed in a gauntlet match to determine the challenger for the WWE Universal Championship at the Royal Rumble, defeating Rey Mysterio, King Corbin, and Daniel Bryan, the latter of whom he proceeded to shake hands with following Bryan's loss, before he lost to Adam Pearce after being assaulted by champion Roman Reigns and Jey Uso, turning face for the first time since 2018. At Royal Rumble on January 31, Nakamura entered at #7, but was eliminated by King Corbin. On the May 14 episode of SmackDown, after losing to Corbin, Nakamura attacked him before stealing his crown, starting a feud between the two. The next week, Rick Boogs became an ally of Nakamura, playing the guitar for him during his entrance. On the June 18 episode of SmackDown, Nakamura defeated Corbin in a "Battle for the Crown" match to become the new King. Now known as "King Nakamura", he defeated Corbin on the July 9 episode of SmackDown to qualify for the Money in the Bank ladder match at the titular event on July 18, which was won by Big E. On the August 13 episode of SmackDown, Nakamura defeated Apollo Crews to win his second Intercontinental Championship. He defeated Crews in a rematch on the September 24 episode of SmackDown to retain the title in his only successful defense. On the October 8 episode of SmackDown, just prior to the start of the King of the Ring tournament that night, Nakamura relinquished the crown. At Survivor Series on November 21, Nakamura defeated United States Champion Damian Priest by disqualification in a champion vs. champion match. On the February 18, 2022 (taped February 11) episode of SmackDown, Nakamura lost the title to Sami Zayn, ending his reign at 189 days.

At Night 1 of WrestleMania 38 on April 2, Boogs and Nakamura faced The Usos for the SmackDown Tag Team Championship in a losing effort.

After six months away from WWE programming, Nakamura made his return on the April 14, 2023, episode of SmackDown, scoring a victory over Madcap Moss, but was then drafted to the Raw brand during the 2023 WWE Draft. After weeks of frustration building up throughout the latter half of July, Nakamura eventually snapped and attacked Seth Rollins after a match, turning heel for the first time since 2021. Nakamura wrestled Rollins for the World Heavyweight Championship on September 2 at Payback and on October 7 at Fastlane in a Last Man Standing match, but he didn't win the title.

Nakamura then began appearing in pre-filmed promos, challenging an unspecified wrestler. He subsequently began a feud with Rhodes after spraying his face with mist on the November 27 episode of Raw. On the December 11 episode of Raw, Rhodes defeated Nakamura by disqualification as Nakamura once again utilized the mist to blind Rhodes. Nakamura continued to torment Rhodes through promos, leading to a Street Fight match on the January 8, 2024 episode of Raw, where Nakamura lost to Rhodes. On January 27, at the Royal Rumble, Nakamura entered at #6, before he was eliminated by eventual winner Rhodes. On the February 5 episode of Raw, Nakamura lost to Rhodes in a Bull Rope match, ending their feud. In the 2024 Draft, Nakamura was drafted back to the SmackDown brand. Following the Draft, he would have another lengthy absence from television, mostly appearing on house shows before making his on-screen return seven months later on the November 15 episode of SmackDown, attacking United States Champion LA Knight after his title match against Berto. During this time, Nakamura would debut a sinister, samurai-themed gimmick. He had his televised return match on the November 29 episode of SmackDown, defeating Andrade before spraying poison mist in Knight's face. At Survivor Series: WarGames on November 30, Nakamura defeated Knight to win the United States Championship for the third time. On the January 10, 2025 episode of SmackDown, Nakamura made his first title defense against Knight, which ended in a disqualification loss for Nakamura when The Bloodline's Tama Tonga and Jacob Fatu attacked Knight. However, since championships do not change hands via disqualification or countout unless stipulated, Nakamura remained champion. On the March 7 episode of SmackDown, Nakamura lost the title back to Knight in a rematch, ending his third reign at 97 days. On the October 10 episode of SmackDown, Nakamura returned after a brief hiatus with his old entrance theme, accepting Sami Zayn's open challenge for the United States Championship but the match ended in a no contest after both men were attacked by the MFT, reverting Nakamura back to a face for the first time since 2023.

At Saturday Night's Main Event XLIII on January 24, 2026, Nakamura lost to AJ Styles in what would be the two's final match against each other as Styles would retire a week later.

==== Bakusai (2026–present) ====
On the August 21 episode of SmackDown, Nakamura introduced the debuting Kyoki as his new tag team partner, later adopting the team name of "Bakusai". On the November 13 episode of SmackDown, Bakusai challenged the MFTs (Talla Tonga and Tama Tonga) for the WWE Tag Team Championship but the match ended in a no contest after both teams were attacked by the War Raiders (Erik and Ivar).

=== Pro Wrestling Noah (2023, 2025) ===
On October 30, 2022, Pro Wrestling Noah announced that Nakamura (while under WWE contract) would be The Great Muta's opponent for the Noah The New Year show on January 1, 2023. At the event, Nakamura defeated Muta, his long-time idol, in a dramatic finish. In December, the match was awarded the Best Bout Award (2023) by Tokyo Sports, recognizing it as one of the most outstanding matches of the year in Japan.

On October 14, 2024, in a Pro Wrestling Noah event at Korakuen Hall, Keiji Muto announced that Ulka Sasaki would face Nakamura on January 1, 2025 at Nippon Budokan, as part of the Noah The New Year 2025 show. Nakamura defeated Sasaki at the event.

== Mixed martial arts career ==
Nakamura has an extensive background in mixed martial arts, and he has incorporated his martial arts background into his wrestling move set as well. In an interview with Bleacher Report he stated "My character is from everything I have in my life," "I have experience in karate, kung fu, boxing, kickboxing, Brazilian jiu-jitsu, submission wrestling and more."

In 2002 Nakamura began training vale tudo and ended up making his pro MMA debut later that same year on December 31, in a middleweight bout vs. Daniel Gracie. He lost the fight via submission in the second round.

Nakamura then moved up to heavyweight for his next bout vs. Jan Nortje on May 2, 2003. Nakamura won the fight via forearm choke in the second round.

Nakamura then faced Shane Eitner on September 13, 2003, he won the fight via an americana submission in the first round.

Nakamura next fight vs. Alexey Ignashov was on December 31, 2003 the fight ended in a no contest. His last pro fight came on May 22, 2004 in a rematch against Ignashov. Nakamura won the fight via forearm choke in the second round.

In 2017 Nakamura revealed that he was offered to fight for the UFC in 2005: “Around 2005, UFC offered me a chance to fight for them. But, at that moment, I was under contract with NJPW and I decided to stay in pro-wrestling. It was a good opportunity, but I don’t regret my choice.”

In 2024 Nakamura cornered UFC fighter Rei Tsuruya during his fight at UFC 303.

== In other media ==
Along with fellow NJPW wrestler Kazuchika Okada, Nakamura is featured in the Japanese music video directed by fashion designer, DJ and record producer Nigo for Pharrell Williams' song "Happy", released in May 2014.

In 2015 they also appeared in the music video for the song LOLLiPOP by Tempura Kidz, which in 2024 was used in Sonic the Hedgehog 3 (film) soundtrack.

On May 27, 2014, Nakamura published an autobiography titled King of Strong Style: 1980–2014. An English language version of the book was released by Viz Media on August 7, 2018.

Nakamura made his first video game appearance as a playable character in King of Colosseum II in 2004, Nakamura has been added into many WWE games, including: WWE Tap Mania, WWE Mayhem, WWE Universe, WWE Undefeated, WWE Champions, WWE SuperCard, WWE 2K17 (As DLC), WWE 2K18, WWE 2K19, WWE 2K20, WWE 2K Battlegrounds, WWE 2K22, WWE 2K23, WWE 2K24, WWE 2K25 and WWE 2K26.

Nakamura's WWE theme was sampled on Lil Uzi Vert's song "Nakamura" (named after him), which appeared on Uzi's 2023 album Pink Tape.

== Personal life ==
As of March 2016, Nakamura resided in Orlando, Florida. He practices Brazilian jiu-jitsu and Shito-ryu karate, and has also been an avid surfer since 2003. Nakamura also has an interest in ninjas and samurais, along with being a fan of Jackie Chan and Bruce Lee, both of whom he cites as inspirations in starting his wrestling and martial arts careers.

== Championships and accomplishments ==
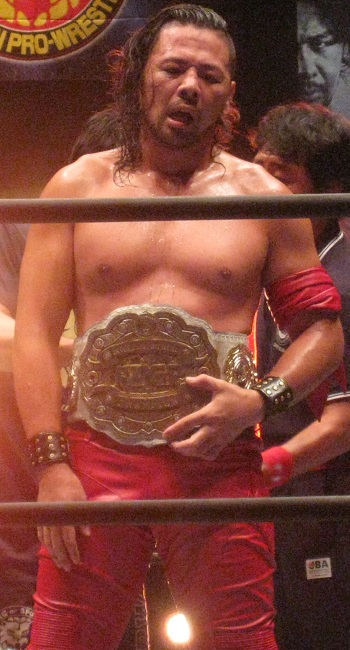
Nakamura is a five-time and longest reigning IWGP Intercontinental Champion...

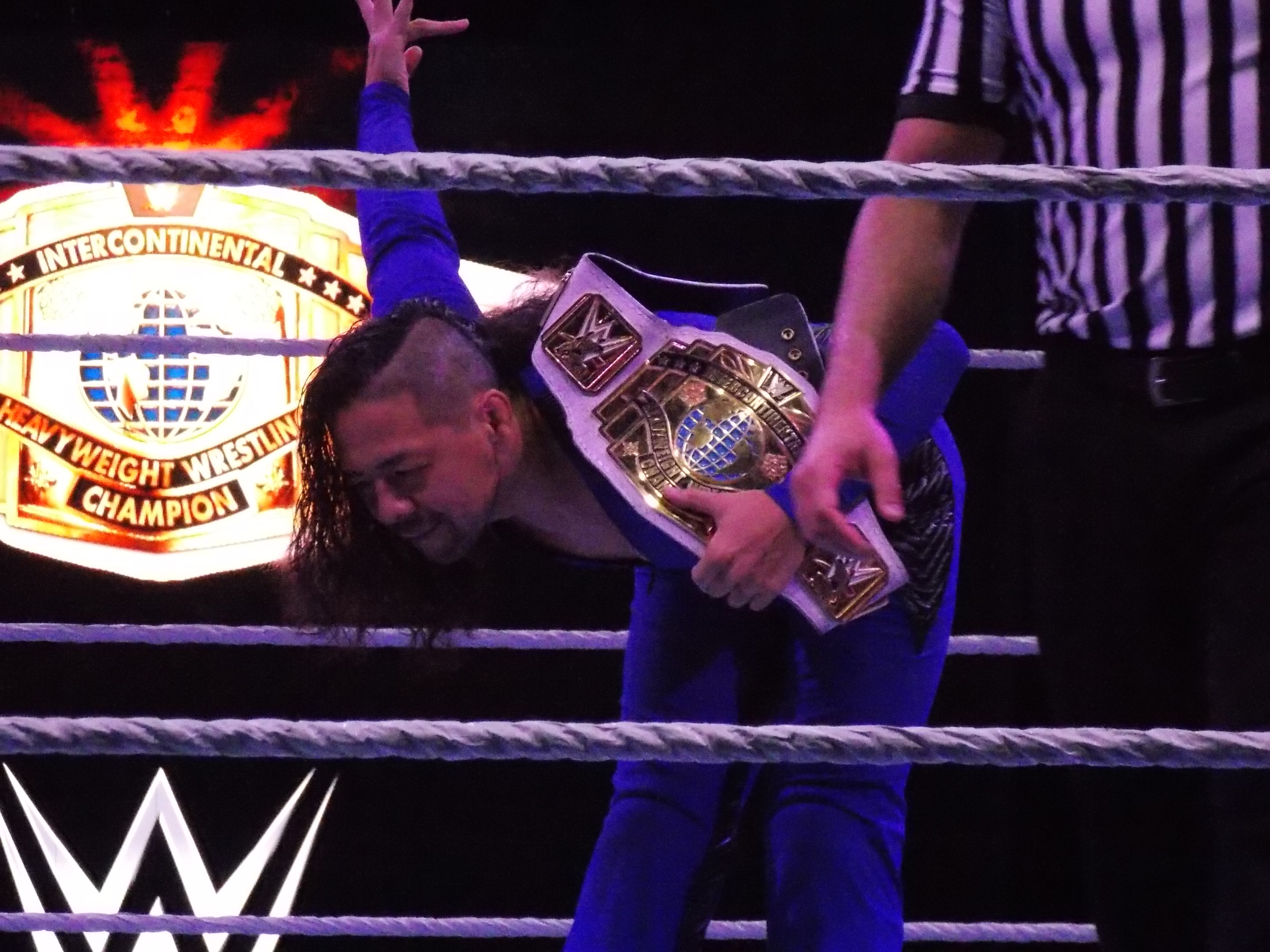
...a two-time WWE Intercontinental Champion...

...and a three-time WWE United States Champion.

- New Japan Pro-Wrestling
  - IWGP 3rd Belt Championship (Note: After winning the IGF's version of the IWGP Heavyweight Championship, also known as the IWGP 3rd Belt Championship, the title was unified with the NJPW sanctioned IWGP Heavyweight Championship, which Nakamura also held at the time.) (1 time, final)
  - IWGP Heavyweight Championship (3 times)
  - IWGP Intercontinental Championship (5 times)
  - IWGP Tag Team Championship (1 time) – with Hiroshi Tanahashi
  - IWGP U-30 Openweight Championship (1 time)
  - NWF Heavyweight Championship (Note: After winning the NWF Heavyweight Championship, the title was unified with the IWGP Heavyweight Championship, which Nakamura also held at the time.) (1 time, final)
  - 10,000,000 Yen Tag Tournament (2004) – with Hiroyoshi Tenzan
  - G1 Climax (2011)
  - G1 Tag League (2006) – with Masahiro Chono
  - National District Tournament (2006) – with Koji Kanemoto
  - New Japan Cup (2014)
  - Teisen Hall Cup Six Man Tag Team Tournament (2003) – with Hiro Saito and Tatsutoshi Goto
  - Yuko Six Man Tag Team Tournament (2004) – with Blue Wolf and Katsuhiko Nakajima
  - Heavyweight Tag MVP Award (2005) with Hiroshi Tanahashi
  - New Wave Award (2003)
  - Tag Team Best Bout (2004) with Hiroyoshi Tenzan vs. Katsuyori Shibata and Masahiro Chono on October 24
  - Technique Award (2004)
- Nikkan Sports
  - Match of the Year Award (2009) vs. Hiroshi Tanahashi on November 8
  - Match of the Year Award (2014) vs. Kazuchika Okada on August 10
  - Outstanding Performance Award (2003)
  - Technique Award (2012)
- Pro Wrestling Illustrated
  - Most Popular Wrestler of the Year (2016)
  - Ranked No. 5 of the best 500 singles wrestlers in the PWI 500 in 2015
- The Baltimore Sun
  - WWE Match of the Year (2016) vs. Sami Zayn at NXT TakeOver: Dallas
- Tokyo Sports
  - Best Bout Award (2013) vs. Kota Ibushi on August 4
  - Best Bout Award (2014) vs. Kazuchika Okada on August 10
  - Best Bout Award (2023) vs. The Great Muta on Noah The New Year 2023
  - Rookie of the Year Award (2003)
  - Technique Award (2012)
- Wrestling Observer Newsletter
  - Most Charismatic (2014, 2015)
  - Pro Wrestling Match of the Year (2015) vs. Kota Ibushi on January 4
  - Wrestler of the Year (2014)
  - Wrestling Observer Newsletter Hall of Fame (Class of 2015)
- WWE
  - NXT Championship (2 times)
  - WWE Intercontinental Championship (2 times)
  - WWE United States Championship (3 times)
  - WWE SmackDown Tag Team Championship (1 time) – with Cesaro
  - Men's Royal Rumble (2018)
  - Battle for the Crown (2021)
  - NXT Year-End Award (2 times)
    - Male Competitor of the Year (2016)
    - Overall Competitor of the Year (2016)

== Mixed martial arts record ==
Professional record breakdown
5 matches	3 wins	1 loss
By submission	3	1
No contests	1	

Res.	Record	Opponent	Method	Event	Date	Round	Time	Location	Notes
Win	3–1 (1)	Alexey Ignashov	Submission (forearm choke)	K-1 MMA ROMANEX	May 22, 2004	2	1:51	Saitama, Japan	
NC	2–1 (1)	Alexey Ignashov	NC (overturned)	K-1 PREMIUM 2003 Dynamite!!	December 31, 2003	3	1:19	Nagoya, Japan	
Win	2–1	Shane Eitner	Submission (americana)	Jungle Fight 1	September 13, 2003	1	4:29	Manaus, Brazil	
Win	1–1	Jan Nortje	Submission (forearm choke)	NJPW Ultimate Crush	May 2, 2003	2	3:12	Tokyo, Japan	
Loss	0–1	Daniel Gracie	Submission (armbar)	Inoki Bom-Ba-Ye 2002	December 31, 2002	2	2:14	Saitama, Japan	
