= Masahiro Chono =

Japanese professional wrestler (born 1963)

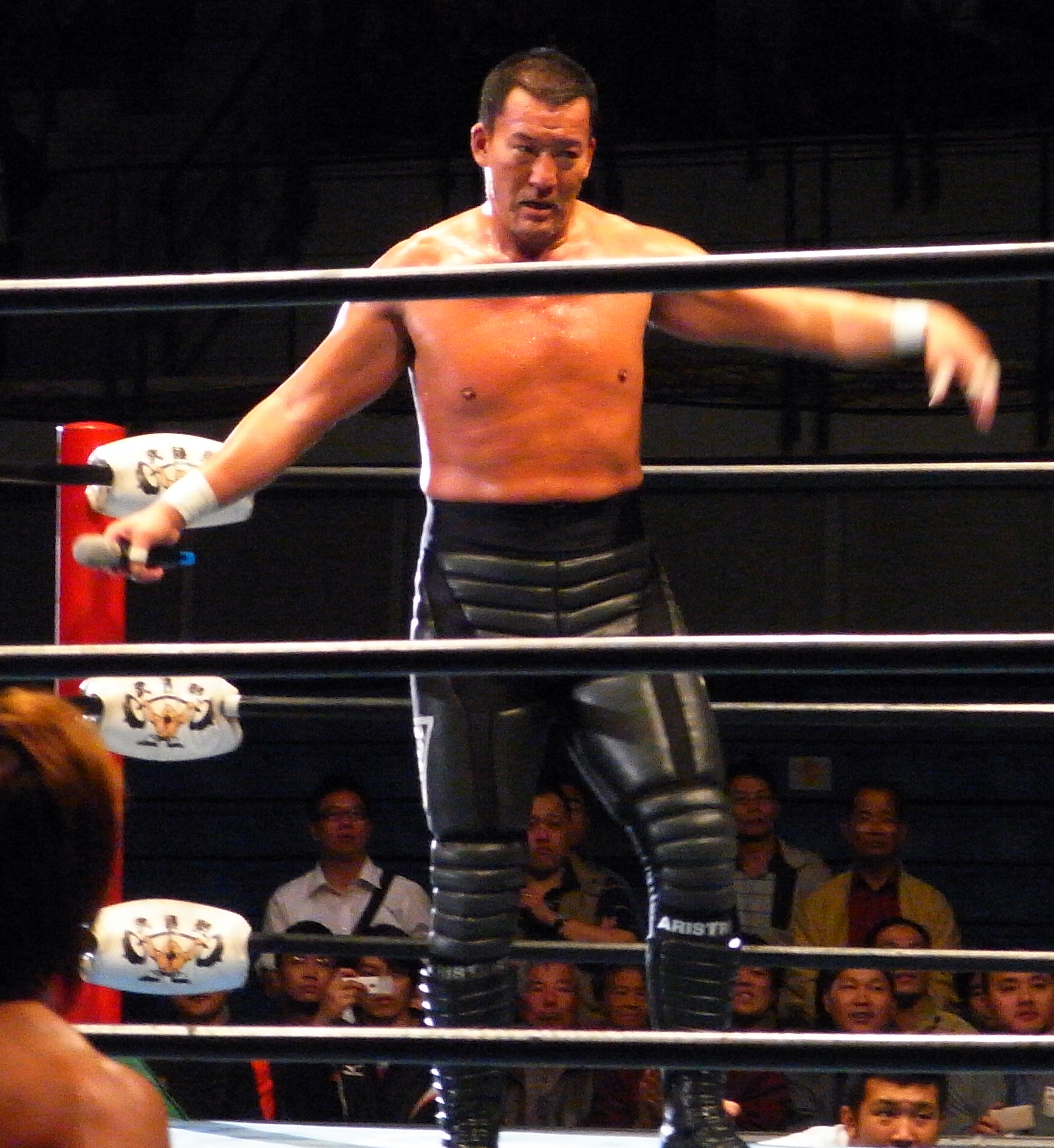
- Chono in November 2010

Personal information
- Born: September 17, 1963 (age 63) Seattle, Washington, U.S.

Professional wrestling career
- Ring name(s): Kamikaze Chono; Masahiro Chono; Masa Chono; Tokyo Chono
- Billed height: 6 ft 1 in (185 cm)
- Billed weight: 238 lb (108 kg)
- Billed from: Tokyo, Japan (WCW); Mitaka, Tokyo (NJPW)
- Trained by: Stu Hart; Lou Thesz; Antonio Inoki; Kotetsu Yamamoto
- Debut: October 5, 1984
- Retired: February 21, 2023

Masahiro Chono (蝶野正洋, Chōno Masahiro; born September 17, 1963) is an American-born Japanese retired professional wrestler and actor best known for his 26-year stint with New Japan Pro-Wrestling (NJPW). As the leader of nWo Japan, Team 2000 and Black New Japan, he was the promotion's top heel for much of his career, beginning in 1994 when he adopted a yakuza inspired gimmick.

Aside from his work in NJPW, Chono has also made appearances for World Championship Wrestling (WCW), as a member of the New World Order, as well as occasional appearances in All Japan Pro Wrestling (AJPW), Pro Wrestling Noah and Pro Wrestling Zero1. Chono holds the record for most wins at the G1 Climax at 5, which has earned him the nicknames "Mr. August" and "Mr. G1". Overall, he is a two-time world champion, with one reign as IWGP Heavyweight Champion and NWA Worlds Heavyweight Champion each. He is also a seven-time IWGP Tag Team Champion.

== Professional wrestling career ==
=== New Japan Pro-Wrestling (1984–2010) ===
==== Early years (1984–1989) ====
A freestyle wrestler during his high school years, Chōno debuted professionally in 1984 against Keiji Mutoh at a New Japan Pro-Wrestling (NJPW) event in Saitama, Japan. In 1987, he defeated Shinya Hashimoto to win the Young Lions Cup. After winning the tournament, he went on an excursion that started in Europe, wrestling for Otto Wanz's Catch Wrestling Association.

After a while in Europe, Chono went on an excursion to North America, starting in the United States for Central States Wrestling in Kansas City, which by then had broken away from the National Wrestling Alliance to form the World Wrestling Alliance. His first major feud was against Mike George over the NWA Central States TV and WWA World Heavyweight championships. He would also later wrestle in the Canadian Maritimes for Atlantic Grand Prix Wrestling and in Puerto Rico, where he, Hashimoto, and Mutoh formed The Three Musketeers.

Chono returned to NJPW part-time in July 1988. He came back to the United States in October 1988 and teamed with Mike Davis in Continental Championship Wrestling (CCW), by then renamed the Continental Wrestling Federation (CWF), and won that company's tag titles as the Japanese Connection.

In April 1989, he took part in the IWGP Heavyweight Championship tournament, held at New Japan's very first show at the Tokyo Dome; he lost to eventual winner of the tournament and new champion Big Van Vader in the quarterfinals. During this time, he would return to the United States and have a brief run in Australia.

==== Rise to superstardom (1989–1994) ====
Upon Chono's return to New Japan in October 1989, he reinvented himself. On October 15, 1989 during a match against Matt Borne where he was victorious, he debuted his signature move, the STF. On February 10, 1990, he wrestled in the main-event of NJPW's second Tokyo Dome show, teaming with Shinya Hashimoto against Antonio Inoki and Seiji Sakaguchi, on April 27 he won the IWGP Tag Team Championship with Mutoh, and on December 26 he defeated his mentor, wrestling legend Lou Thesz, when Thesz came out of retirement for one last match. The next year, Chono solidified his main-event status with an amazing performance in the first G1 Climax tournament, winning the tournament in a thirty-minute final over Mutoh.

He won the tournament again in 1992, winning the NWA World Heavyweight Championship in the process. Since then, he has won the tournament on three more occasions. On September 23, 1992, Chono suffered a serious neck injury from a botched sitdown tombstone piledriver while defending the NWA World Heavyweight Championship against Steve Austin. On January 4, 1993, he lost the NWA World title to IWGP Heavyweight champion The Great Muta in a Title vs. Title match. Around 1993, he participated in his third G1 Climax tournament, losing to Hiroshi Hase in the semi-finals. In January 1994, he received a shot at the IWGP Heavyweight Championship against Shinya Hashimoto, though he would ultimately lose the match. In August 1994, he won his third G1 Climax tournament, defeating Power Warrior in the finals.

==== nWo Japan and Team 2000 (1994–2004) ====
A short time after winning his third G1 Climax, Chono underwent a change in attitude. Originally a clean-cut fan favorite during his NWA World title reign, he turned heel, angered that Power Warrior received a shot at the IWGP Heavyweight Championship before him, as he won the tournament. He also changed his image and adopted a yakuza gimmick, complete with sunglasses, menacing mannerisms and black coats and tights. Chono's partnering with Hiroyoshi Tenzan and Hiro Saito as "Team Wolf" provided a foundation to NJPW's nWo Japan. Establishing himself as leader of its Japanese sister stable, Chono joined the American nWo in December 1996 as it was gaining momentum in World Championship Wrestling (WCW). He would also join its successor, Team 2000, which would eventually restructure again. In a match against WCW's Bill Goldberg, Chono supposedly "shot" the match (actually employing legitimate combat) and dislocated his shoulder.

Upon returning to Japan, Chono rejoined NJPW, where he achieved much success. He won the IWGP Tag Team Titles on six occasions and also won the very prestigious IWGP Heavyweight Title in 1998. In 2002, Chono won his fourth G1 Climax tournament and had a brief, memorable feud with WWE's Chyna. He also became a booker for NJPW around this time. In 2003, Chono briefly joined Pro Wrestling NOAH for a handful of matches and was defeated by GHC Champion Kenta Kobashi on 2 May of that year. On October 13, he lost to Hulk Hogan.

==== Black New Japan and ChoTen (2004–2007) ====
In early 2004, Chono became the leader of the Black New Japan stable, which was the most dominating heel stable in NJPW until it was disbanded by Riki Choshu. As a reaction to this, Chono lead an "Anti-Choshu Army" with Hiroyoshi Tenzan and Black Strong Machine. Chono won the 2005 G1 Climax tournament, thus having achieved a record-setting five G1 victories. His success in the G1 has given him the nickname Mr. August.

On October 30, 2005, Masahiro Chono and Tenzan defeated the team of Shinsuke Nakamura and Hiroshi Tanahashi to win their fifth IWGP Tag Team Championship. The team went on to rename themselves Cho-Ten, a portmanteau of the members' names. They were stripped of the titles in late 2006 after they split up, and refused to defend them together. Masahiro Chono formed a stable with Shinsuke Nakamura in 2006 called Chono and Nakamura-gun, which began feuding with Tenzan's new group, GBH.

==== Legend (2007–2010) ====
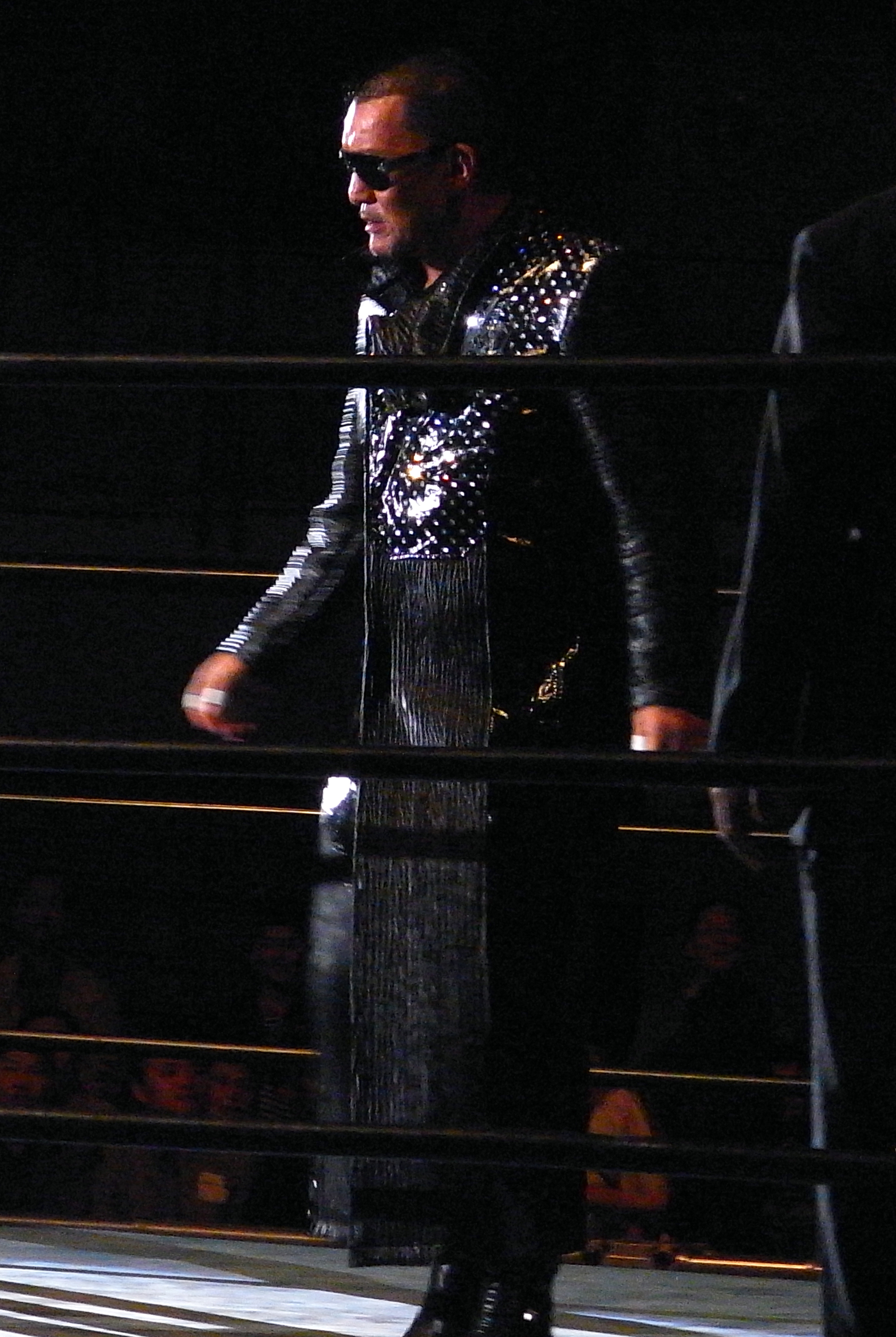
Chono in November 2010

Chono continued to wrestle full-time in 2007, but also began working as a promoter, with New Japan permitting him to set up cards in different areas of Japan. Following the 2007 G1 Climax, it appears that Chono may be breaking away from his BLACK faction and formed the Legend stable, having sworn in wrestlers such as Riki Choshu, Jushin Thunder Liger, Shiro Koshinaka, and AKIRA.

Outside wrestling, Chono began appearing on Gaki no Tsukai's "No Laughing Batsu Game" as one of the attackers, usually giving Hōsei Tsukitei a slap to the face.

In January 2010 it was reported that Chono would be leaving New Japan and becoming a freelancer, after spending most of his career with the company.

=== Later career (2010–2023) ===
In March 2010, Chono portrayed Nobunaga Oda in two matches during a Samurai Festival after leaving New Japan. Chono wrestled AKIRA, who portrayed Mitsuhide Akechi, on both days, winning the first match and losing the second. On August 15, 2010, Chono returned to New Japan to serve as the special ring announcer for the G1 Climax final match between Hiroshi Tanahashi and Satoshi Kojima. On November 5 and 6, Chono appeared in a series of shows in Taiwan for All Japan. On November 5, Chono and Mutoh defeated the Voodoo Murders (TARU and Rene Dupree). The following day, Chono teamed with Mutoh and Masakatsu Funaki to defeat the Voodoo Murders (Dupree, KENSO, and Joe Doering). In December 2010, Chono began working for Antonio Inoki's Inoki Genome Federation as a booker.

On March 6, 2011, Chono entered Pro Wrestling ZERO1 for their 10th Anniversary Show, where he defeated Daichi Hashimoto in his debut match. On April 17, 2011, Chono wrestled for Osaka Pro, where he teamed with Kuuga and Orochi in a losing effort against Shodai Tiger Mask, Billyken Kid, and Tsubasa. On August 14, 2011, Chono returned to Osaka Pro, teaming with TAJIRI and Zeus in a victory over JOKER (Kuuga, Orochi, and Tadasuke). On October 3, 2011, Chono returned to NJPW for a Team Wolf reunion match, teaming with Hiroyoshi Tenzan and Hiro Saito to defeat Osamu Nishimura, Koji Kanemoto, and Shinjiro Otani.

In January 2013, Chono signed with All Japan Pro Wrestling (AJPW) as an advisor. On August 25, 2013, Chono teamed with Joe Doering and defeated KENSO and AJPW President Nobuo Shiraishi in an exhibition tag team match. Chono left AJPW in 2014.

After returning to freelance, Chono wrestled once in eight years: a six man tag team match for Dotonbori Pro Wrestling on April 13, 2014. He teamed with Daisuke Masaoka and Hayata in a loss to Super Delfin, Hub, and Gran Hamada. From 2014, Chono's appearances were limited to non-active roles such as commentary, talk battles and special appearances. In a 2017 interview, Chono did not completely rule out the possibility of a return to the ring but believed it would be unlikely due to various injuries. In 2021, he revealed that he had been suffering from spinal stenosis and underwent surgery for it, which was successful.

In a 2022 interview, Chono discussed how Keiji Muto requested to have his retirement match with him but was unsure if he could compete. On February 21, 2023, Chono was challenged to an impromptu match by Muto during Muto's retirement show at the Tokyo Dome, which Chono won. Chono announced his own retirement following the match.

== Personal life ==
On December 28, 1991, Chono married Martina Carlsbad, whom he met while on an excursion in Germany in 1987. Together they have one son (born July 4, 2006) and one daughter (born August 2009).

On July 9, 1995, Chono's father died. His death forced Chono to miss an IWGP Tag Team title defense and take a hiatus, which forced him and Hiroyoshi Tenzan to vacate the title on July 7, 1995.

Since 1999, Chono has owned his own clothing brand, Aristrist (stylised in all caps), with his wife Martina. The name is a portmanteau of "Aristo" and "Tristano".

== Other media ==
Chono appears as a gang member in the 2017 video game Yakuza Kiwami 2, alongside Genichiro Tenryu, Keiji Mutoh, Riki Choshu and Tatsumi Fujinami. Besides appearing in numerous TV shows, he was the voice actor in the Japanese dubbed version of Blade: Trinity for Jarko Grimwood, portrayed by fellow professional wrestler Triple H.

Chono has provided his vocals for an UTAU voice library, distributed through the February 2013 issue of UTAU Perfect Master, a Windows100% mook.

== Championships and accomplishments ==
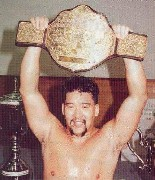
Chono as the NWA World Heavyweight Champion in 1992

- Atlantic Grand Prix Wrestling
  - AGPW North American Tag Team Championship (1 time) – with Bob Brown
- Central States Wrestling / World Wrestling Alliance
  - NWA Central States Television Championship (1 time)
  - WWA World Heavyweight Championship (1 time)
- Continental Wrestling Federation
  - CWF Tag Team Championship (1 time) – with Mike Davis
- Hawai'i Championship Wrestling
  - HCW Kamehameha Heritage World Heavyweight Championship (1 time)
- New Japan Pro-Wrestling
  - IWGP Heavyweight Championship (1 time)
  - IWGP Tag Team Championship (7 times) – with Keiji Mutoh (2), Hiroyoshi Tenzan (5)
  - NWA World Heavyweight Championship (1 time)
  - G1 Climax (1991, 1992, 1994, 2002, 2005)
  - G1 Tag League (2006) – with Shinsuke Nakamura
  - Super Grade Tag League (1995) – with Hiroyoshi Tenzan
  - Super Grade Tag League (1997) – with Keiji Mutoh
  - Teisen Hall Six-Man Tournament (2002) – with Giant Singh and Giant Silva
  - Japan/China Friendship Tournament (1990)
  - Young Lion Cup (1987)
  - Heavyweight MVP Award (2005)
  - Singles Best Bout (2002) vs. Yuji Nagata on October 26
  - Singles Best Bout (2005) vs. Kazuyuki Fujita on August 14
  - Tag Team Best Bout (2002) with Hiroyoshi Tenzan vs. Manabu Nakanishi and Osamu Nishimura on June 5
  - Tag Team Best Bout (2004) with Katsuyori Shibata vs. Hiroyoshi Tenzan and Shinsuke Nakamura on October 24
  - NJPW New Year Tag Team Tournament (1990) – with Shiro Koshinaka
- Nikkan Sports
  - Wrestler of the Year (1997)
- Pro Wrestling Illustrated
  - PWI ranked him No. 28 of the 500 best singles wrestlers of the PWI 500 in 1997
  - PWI ranked him No. 70 of the 500 best singles wrestlers of the "PWI Years" in 2003
- Tokyo Sports
  - Fighting Spirit Award (1991, 2002)
  - Outstanding Performance Award (1992)
  - Tag Team of the Year (1990)- with Keiji Mutoh
  - Tag Team of the Year (1995)- with Hiroyoshi Tenzan
  - Tag Team of the Year (1996)- with Hiroyoshi Tenzan and Hiro Saito
  - Wrestler of the Year (1997)
- Wrestling Observer Newsletter awards
  - Best Heel (1995)
  - Best Gimmick (1996) – nWo
  - Feud of the Year (1996) New World Order vs. World Championship Wrestling
  - Worst Worked Match of the Year (1992) vs. Rick Rude at Halloween Havoc
  - Wrestling Observer Newsletter Hall of Fame (Class of 2004)
