= Kazuyuki Fujita =

Japanese professional wrestler and MMA fighter (born 1970)

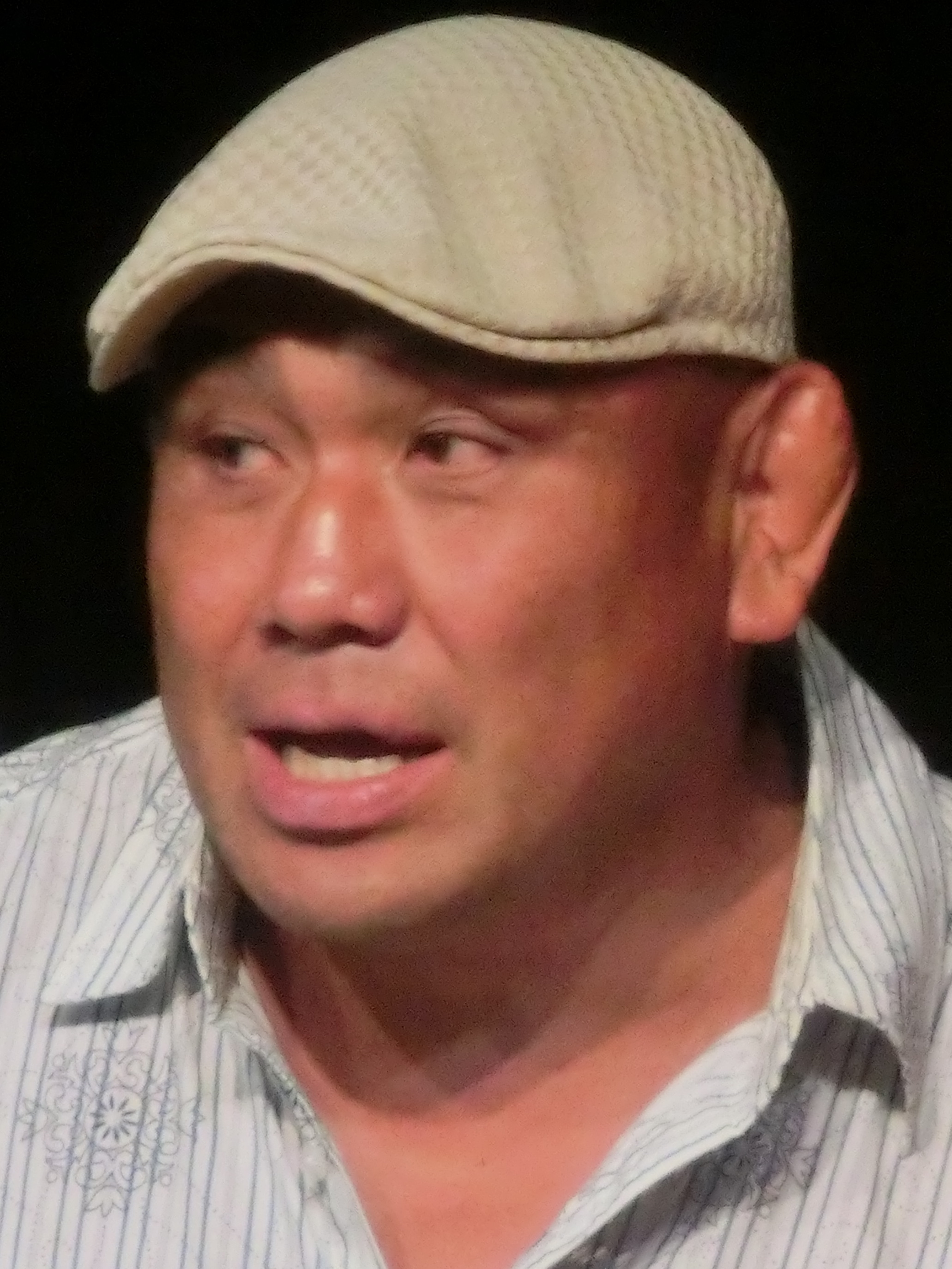
- Fujita in 2018
- Born: October 16, 1970 (age 56); Funabashi, Chiba, Japan
- Other names: Ol' Ironhead; The Last Disciple of Antonio Inoki; The Last Successor of Inokiism; Wild Beast; The Real Beast
- Height: 6 ft (183 cm)
- Weight: 240 lb (109 kg; 17 st 2 lb)
- Division: Heavyweight
- Style: MMA; Freestyle wrestling, shoot wrestling
- Stance: Orthodox
- Fighting out of: Funabashi, Chiba, Japan
- Teachers: Antonio Inoki; Satoru Sayama; Marco Ruas
- Years active: 2000–2009, 2013, 2016-2018 (MMA)

Mixed martial arts record
- Total: 32
- Wins: 18
- By knockout: 9
- By submission: 7
- By decision: 2
- Losses: 14
- By knockout: 8
- By submission: 2
- By decision: 4

Other information
- Mixed martial arts record from Sherdog

Kazuyuki Fujita (藤田 和之, Fujita Kazuyuki; born October 16, 1970) is a Japanese professional wrestler, former mixed martial artist and freestyle wrestler, currently signed to Pro Wrestling Noah, where he is a one-time GHC Heavyweight Champion. He has most recently fought in Road FC, but is also known for his work in the PRIDE Fighting Championships, K-1, Rizin Fighting Federation, and World Victory Road.

Fujita began his career as a professional wrestler in 1993, joining the New Japan Pro-Wrestling (NJPW) dojo, while still competing as an amateur wrestler. Debuting in 1996, Fujita would put his wrestling career on hiatus in early 2000 to train in MMA. Returning the following year with a new shoot based offence, Fujita won the IWGP Heavyweight Championship immediately and went on to hold it two more times before leaving the company in 2005. After a six-year hiatus, Fujita returned to pro wrestling in 2011 for Inoki Genome Federation (IGF), and continues to make occasional appearances as a freelancer, most recently for Pro Wrestling Noah and Real Japan Pro Wrestling (RJPW).

== Early life ==
Fujita practiced freestyle wrestling in high school. He participated in the FILA World Championships as a junior in 1988, placing sixth, and in the Espoir division in 1989, placing eleventh. In 1993, Fujita placed fifth at the Asian Championships at the senior level, and in 1993 and 1994, he represented Japan as a senior in the World Cup, a dual meet tournament. He was also a national champion in Japan in Greco-Roman wrestling. He missed making the Japanese Olympic team by 1 point in the Olympic qualifiers.

== Professional wrestling career ==
=== New Japan Pro-Wrestling (1996–2005) ===
==== Early career (1996–2000) ====
Fujita was approached to join New Japan Pro-Wrestling (NJPW) in 1993 whilst he was still competing in amateur wrestling. Fujita agreed to join, but because of his amateur career, his professional debut was delayed three years until 1996. Fujita made his in-ring debut on November 1, 1996, losing to Yuji Nagata. Fujita was trained in the NJPW dojo by Antonio Inoki and Satoru Sayama, who described him as a "monster". Regarded as a promising rookie for his natural athletic ability and strength, Fujita was pushed as a future star during his young lion days. In 1998, he was one of the wrestlers selected to face Riki Choshu in one of his retirement matches, and was also chosen as a training partner for former judoka Naoya Ogawa during his transition into professional wrestling. Despite being praised and touted as a future star, Fujita had doubts about a career in professional wrestling, and didn't feel like he was adapting to it well enough. In addition, he struggled to find a regular position on the card behind more experienced rookies like Yuji Nagata, Manabu Nakanishi and Satoshi Kojima. In 1999, he requested to leave New Japan with the intention of joining Fighting Network Rings, a former shoot-style promotion that had recently changed itself to a full on mixed martial arts company. New Japan higher ups agreed to the move, as did Rings' owner Akira Maeda, but at the last minute, New Japan owner and Fujita's trainer Antonio Inoki intervened and stopped it. In a bid to keep Fujita in New Japan, Inoki sent him abroad to train for MMA, with the intention of sending him to Pride Fighting Championship as a representative of Team Inoki. Fujita's run in Pride was successful, and in 2001 he was bought back in to wrestle for New Japan.

==== Return and championship push (2001–2005) ====
After over a year away from pro-wrestling, Fujita's return to NJPW was announced in early 2001 for the Strong Style 2001 pay-per-view on April 9, where he was set to face Scott Norton for the IWGP Heavyweight Championship. Fujita dominated the match with his new shoot-based offence and quickly won the championship in just under 7 minutes. Fujita made two successful defences, beating Yuji Nagata and Don Frye. Fujita reigned as champion until January 2002, when he was forced to vacate the title due to injury.

Fujita returned to New Japan on July 20, 2002, at Toukon Memorial Day, beating junior heavyweight Masahito Kakihara in 1:09. At Cross Road on August 29, Fujita entered a tournament for the vacated NWF Heavyweight Championship but was defeated by eventual winner Yoshihiro Takayama, giving Fujita his first loss in New Japan since January 2000. On October 14, Fujita challenged Yuji Nagata for the IWGP Heavyweight Championship but came up short.

After spending most of 2003 in Pride, Fujita returned to New Japan once again in October 2003 at Ultimate Crush II, teaming with Minoru Suzuki, Bob Sapp, Yoshihiro Takayama and Shinsuke Nakamura as "Shin Inoki Gun" to defeat Yuji Nagata, Hiroyoshi Tenzan, Hiroshi Tanahashi, Manabu Nakanishi and Seiji Sakaguchi. In June 2004, he won the vacated IWGP Heavyweight Championship for a second time by defeating Hiroshi Tanahashi. He lost the championship to Kensuke Sasaki on October 9, 2004.

In 2005 he joined the Team JAPAN faction, and on July 18, 2005, he won the championship for the third time against Hiroyoshi Tenzan. In August 2005, Fujita entered the 2005 G1 Climax where he won all his matches in the round robin portion, then defeated Toshiaki Kawada but lost to Masahiro Chono in the finals. He lost the IWGP Championship to Brock Lesnar on October 8, 2005, at Toukon Souzou New Chapter in a three-way match including Masahiro Chono. Lesnar pinned Chono to win the title. In late 2005 he withdrew from a rematch with Lesnar, scheduled for January 4, 2006. Fujita was represented by Inoki Office, an agency originally started by Antonio Inoki, and had not been under a contract with NJPW.

=== Inoki Genome Federation (2011–2015) ===
After almost 6 years away from the ring, Fujita returned to professional wrestling in 2011 with his longtime associate and mentor Antonio Inoki's Inoki Genome Federation (IGF) promotion where he competed for the next few years. He won the IGF Championship from Jerome Le Banner in early 2012, and made successful defences against Bobby Lashley, Hideki Suzuki, Erik Hammer and Atsushi Sawada before dropping it to Satoshi Ishii in a worked shoot fight in December 2013. Fujita made a rare appearance outside of IGF in November 2015, competing for Genichiro Tenryu's Tenryu Project retirement show, where he teamed with Daisuke Sekimoto in a loss to Suwama and Yuji Okabayashi. Not long after this, Fujita left IGF and became inactive in pro wrestling once again.

=== Freelance (2017–2019) ===
After two more years away from wrestling, Fujita once again returned to the ring in October 2017, now a freelancer. He formed an alliance with fellow IGF and NJPW alumni Kendo Kashin, with Nosawa Rongai also aligning himself with the pair. They began a feud with Atsushi Onita during the lead up to Onita's retirement match in Korakuen Hall, where the three lost to Onita, Kai and Shingo Takagi on October 31. In early 2018, the trio invaded All Japan Pro Wrestling for a short lived run, starting a feud with Suwama's Evolution stable. In their only official match in the promotion, they defeated Suwama, Hikaru Sato and Yusuke Okada by referee's decision on March 25. Fujita would also make a one-off appearance for Big Japan Pro Wrestling in July 2018, teaming with Daisuke Sekimoto to defeat Daichi Hashimoto and Hideyoshi Kamitani.

After another extended period of absence, Fujita returned to the ring in June 2019, debuting for Real Japan Pro Wrestling (RJPW). Still aligned with Kendo Kashin, Fujita began a feud with RJPW ace Super Tiger, challenging him to a match for the Legend Championship. In a prelude match, Fujita and Kashin defeated Tiger and Masakatsu Funaki. In their official title match on September 19, Fujita defeated Tiger to win the title, ending his reign at 735 days. Fujita also made a special appearance for Pro Wrestling Noah in September, beating Yoshiki Inamura.

== Mixed martial arts career ==
In January 2000 Fujita put his professional wrestling career on hiatus and began training for mixed martial arts competition. His trainer was his professional wrestling mentor and mixed martial arts legend, Antonio Inoki, as well as luta livre veteran Marco Ruas.

=== Pride and K-1 ===
==== First wins ====
Kazuyuki entered the PRIDE organization as part of the 2000 Openweight Grand Prix. His first opponent was Fighting Network RINGS alumnus Hans Nijman, who Fujita beat fast by taking him down and submitting him with a wrestling neck crank. After this success, Inoki sent him abroad to compete in American promotion Extreme Shootout, where he KOed Dan Chase and then submitted Will Childs, before returning to PRIDE.

On May 1, Fujita competed at Pride Grand Prix 2000 Finals, where he would score the first big win of his career by defeating Mark Kerr, who at the time was considered to be one of the best heavyweights in MMA. Kerr dominated early in the match, taking the Japanese down and hitting ground and pound through his guard, followed by a series of knee strikes to the head, but Fujita endured shockingly all the punishment and waited for his opportunity. It finally came when Kerr became visibly tired from attacking, moment in which Kazuyuki took him down, taking his back and launching his own series of knee strikes and hammerfists. Kerr turtled up while Fujita scored points over him with unceasing striking, and at the end the referee stopped the match in Fujita's favour. His win over Kerr was considered to be a gigantic upset, and was the first loss in Kerr's career, snapping a 13-fight unbeaten streak.

Fujita's next fight was against former UFC Heavyweight Champion Mark Coleman in the semifinals of the Grand Prix, but the NJPW corner threw in the towel at the start of the match to avoid risks for Fujita's health. Despite Fujita being eliminated from the tournament, he became a star with the Japanese crowds for his victory over Kerr; the toughness he demonstrated in that fight gaining him the nickname "Ironhead". As Fujita himself noted, "I am not so great a puncher, not so great a kicker. I don't really have anything all that great, but in today's vale tudo, the strongest is the one that can take a beating."

At Pride 10, Fujita next fought MMA superstar Ken Shamrock. Like in the Kerr fight, Fujita took another incredible beating yet was not knocked out, and Shamrock then began to experience heart attack symptoms and had his corner throw in the towel, resulting in another massive win for Fujita and his career. Color commentator Eddie Bravo proclaimed during Fujita's fight with Shamrock, "that guy can take a baseball bat to the side of the head!".

He followed up his titanic wins over Kerr and Shamrock with a win over dangerous striker Gilbert Yvel at Pride 12. Fujita scored takedowns and dominated positionally Yvel for most of the match, only occasionally trying armlocks, in order to secure a decision win. It was after this match that commentator Stephen Quadros coined the term "lay and pray" to describe the strategy.

In May 2001 at Pride 14, Fujita defeated fellow pro wrestler Yoshihiro Takayama by submission in his first PRIDE main event. Notably, Takayama was similarly able to take a great punishment, enduring knees to the head and punches, but Kazuyuki submitted him via arm triangle choke.

==== Main competition ====
On August 19 at the K-1 Andy Hug 2001 GP Final, Fujita fought K-1 legend and future MMA legend Mirko Cro Cop in Cro Cop's MMA debut. The fight was short and brutal, with Fujita shooting a takedown which Cro Cop tried to avoid with a knee strike to the face. Though Fujita was unfazed and completed the takedown, it opened a cut in his eye, which moved the referee to stop the match for a TKO loss for the Japanese.

Fujita was baffled for the fortuitousness of the bout and requested a rematch, which was conceded for the Inoki Bom-Ba-Ye event. This fight would be longer and more intense, with Fujita repeatedly taking the kickboxer down only for the latter to successfully defend from his guard. At the second half of the match, however, Cro Cop started dominating through low kicks and a powerful sprawl, which he used to hold Fujita down while scoring series of unanswered knees to the head. The bout went to the judges, where Mirko seized the unanimous win.

In 2003, after Fujita defeated fellow NJPW pro wrestler Manabu Nakanishi, he launched a challenge to PRIDE champion Fedor Emelianenko for a match in Pride 26. When it came, Kazuyuki shocked the world by stunning Emelianenko with a heavy counter right hand, but despite his best attempts to remain on the offensive Emelianenko recovered and defeated Fujita with a rear naked choke submission. At the end of the year, Fujita defeated American boxer: Imamu Mayfield by submission at Inoki Bom-Ba-Ye 2003.

In May 2004, Fujita made his debut for the K-1 MMA event ROMANEX, taking on then IWGP Heavyweight Champion Bob Sapp. Not fearing Sapp's size and fame, Fujita executed a takedown and went aggressively for Sapp on the ground, repeatedly landing punches and soccer kicks on his head. At this moment, Sapp ceased fighting and only covered himself to defend Fujita's assault. Finally, the referee stopped the match for a TKO victory. Sapp had to vacate his championship after this performance, while Kazuyuki adopted the nickname of "The Real Beast" to capitalize on Sapp's own "The Beast" moniker.

Egyptian Greco-Roman wrestler and Olympic gold medalist Karam Gaber was his next opponent, at the K-1 Premium 2004 Dynamite!! event. The younger and bigger Karam managed to push down and fend off Kazuyuki, but he landed a punch after one minute which knocked out Gaber.

On May 5, 2006, at PRIDE Total Elimination Absolute, Fujita returned to MMA by competing in PRIDE's 2006 Openweight Grand Prix making him the only fighter in PRIDE's history to have competed in both openweight grand prix. In the first round, Fujita defeated James Thompson by knockout. Typically, Thompson dominated Fujita for most of the fight, until Fujita rallied with a flurry of punches that knocked out him at his weakest point.

At the quarterfinals, Fujita fought PRIDE Middleweight champion and feared Muay Thai striker Wanderlei Silva. The match was wild, with Silva landing soccer kicks and knees while Fujita relentlessly tried to take him down and handle him on the ground. After avoiding armbars and triangle chokes by powering out, Fujita controlled the Brazilian through his guard for a few minutes, but the situation returned to the beginning when the referee stood them up. With three minutes left in the clock, Silva unloaded on Fujita and surprisingly managed to knock him down with hook combos, after which he delivered multiple soccer kicks to the face. Although Fujita was not knocked out, he was unable to stop Silva's offence, so the referee stepped in to give the Brazilian the win.

After defeating freestyle champion Eldar Kurtanidze by submission due to strikes, Fujita was pitted against Ultimate Fighting Championship fighter Jeff Monson. The Japanese wrestler fended off takedowns and choke attempts, but Monson was able to lock one of them to make Kazuyuki tap out. The fight was historic as it would be the final fight in PRIDE's history. Fujita would lose by submission.

=== World Victory Road ===
After PRIDE was sold to Zuffa, Fujita joined the new promotion: World Victory Road. He debuted on March 5, 2008, at Sengoku 1 where he defeated Peter Graham by submission. Fujita next fight was against Travis Wiuff at Sengoku 3 where he lost by TKO.

On August 2, 2009, Fujita was defeated by Blagoi Ivanov at World Victory Road's ninth event, Sengoku 9.

On December 31, 2009, at Dynamite!! 2009, Fujita took on Alistair Overeem and was knocked out via knee to the head in the first round. This was the first time Fujita has been knocked unconscious.

After a 4-year hiatus from the sport, Fujita returned to face Satoshi Ishii on December 31, 2013, at Inoki Bom-Ba-Ye 2013 for the IGF Championship. Fujita lost the bout via unanimous decision, marking his fourth loss in a row.

=== Road Fighting Championship ===
After an eight fight losing streak, Fujita has since competed for Road FC where he is currently on a three fight winning streak. However, he has not competed since 2018 due to returning to professional wrestling full-time.

== Championships and accomplishments ==
Mixed Martial Arts

- Extreme Shootout
  - 2000 Extreme Shootout - The Underground Tournament Winner
- Fight Matrix
  - 2000 Rookie of the Year
- PRIDE Fighting Championships
  - 2000 PRIDE Openweight Grand Prix Semi-Finalist

Professional Wrestling

- Inoki Genome Federation
  - IGF Championship (1 time)
- New Japan Pro-Wrestling
  - IWGP Heavyweight Championship (3 times)
  - Singles Best Bout (2005) vs. Masahiro Chono on August 14
- Nikkan Sports
  - Fighting Spirit Award (2000)
- Pro Wrestling Illustrated
  - Ranked No. 434 of the top singles wrestlers in the PWI 500 in 2026
- Pro Wrestling Noah
  - GHC National Championship (1 time)
  - GHC Heavyweight Championship (1 time)
- Strong Style Pro-Wrestling
  - Legend Championship (1 time)
- Tokyo Sports
  - Match of the Year (2001) vs. Yuji Nagata on June 6, 2001
  - Rookie of the Year (1997)

== Mixed martial arts record ==
Professional record breakdown
32 matches	18 wins	14 losses
By knockout	9	8
By submission	7	2
By decision	2	4

Res.	Record	Opponent	Method	Event	Date	Round	Time	Location	Notes
Win	18–14	Choi Mu-Bae	TKO (punches)	Road FC 050	November 3, 2018	1	1:55	Daejeon, South Korea	
Win	17–14	Justin Morton	Submission (north-south choke)	Road FC 049	August 18, 2018	2	1:19	Seoul, South Korea	
Win	16–14	Handong Kong	TKO (retirement)	Road FC 047	May 12, 2018	2	4:46	Beijing, China	Road FC 2018 Openweight Grand Prix Alternate
Loss	15–14	Sang Soo Lee	TKO (punches)	HEAT 41	December 23, 2017	1	3:59	Nagoya, Japan	
Loss	15–13	Aorigele	TKO (punches)	Road FC 044	November 11, 2017	1	1:59	Shijiazhuang, China	
Loss	15–12	Baruto Kaito	Decision (unanimous)	Rizin World Grand-Prix 2016: 1st Round	September 25, 2016	2	5:00	Saitama, Japan	Openweight Grand-Prix 1st Round
Loss	15–11	Jiří Procházka	KO (punch)	Rizin FF 1	April 17, 2016	1	3:33	Nagoya, Japan	
Loss	15–10	Satoshi Ishii	Decision (unanimous)	Inoki Bom-Ba-Ye 2013	December 31, 2013	3	5:00	Tokyo, Japan	For the IGF Championship
Loss	15–9	Alistair Overeem	KO (knee)	Dynamite!! The Power of Courage 2009	December 31, 2009	1	1:15	Saitama, Japan	
Loss	15–8	Blagoi Ivanov	Decision (split)	World Victory Road Presents: Sengoku 9	August 2, 2009	3	5:00	Saitama, Japan	
Loss	15–7	Travis Wiuff	KO (punches)	World Victory Road Presents: Sengoku 3	June 8, 2008	1	1:24	Saitama, Japan	
Win	15–6	Peter Graham	Submission (north-south choke)	World Victory Road Presents: Sengoku First Battle	March 5, 2008	1	1:23	Tokyo, Japan	
Loss	14–6	Jeff Monson	Submission (rear-naked choke)	PRIDE 34	April 8, 2007	1	6:37	Saitama, Japan	
Win	14–5	Eldar Kurtanidze	TKO (submission to punches)	PRIDE FC: Shockwave 2006	December 31, 2006	1	2:09	Saitama, Japan	
Loss	13–5	Wanderlei Silva	TKO (punches and soccer kicks)	Pride FC - Critical Countdown Absolute	July 1, 2006	1	9:21	Saitama, Japan	PRIDE 2006 Openweight Grand Prix Quarterfinal
Win	13–4	James Thompson	KO (punch)	Pride FC - Total Elimination Absolute	May 5, 2006	1	8:25	Osaka, Japan	PRIDE 2006 Openweight Grand Prix First Round.
Win	12–4	Karam Gaber	KO (punch)	K-1 - Premium 2004 Dynamite!!	December 31, 2004	1	1:07	Osaka, Japan	
Win	11–4	Bob Sapp	TKO (submission to soccer kicks)	K-1 MMA ROMANEX	May 22, 2004	1	2:15	Saitama, Japan	
Win	10–4	Imamu Mayfield	Technical Submission (arm-triangle choke)	Inoki Bom-Ba-Ye 2003	December 31, 2003	2	2:15	Kobe, Japan	
Loss	9–4	Fedor Emelianenko	Submission (rear-naked choke)	PRIDE 26	June 8, 2003	1	4:17	Yokohama, Japan	
Win	9–3	Manabu Nakanishi	TKO (punches)	NJPW Ultimate Crush	May 2, 2003	3	1:09	Tokyo, Japan	
Loss	8–3	Mirko Cro Cop	Decision (unanimous)	Inoki Bom-Ba-Ye 2002	December 31, 2002	3	5:00	Saitama, Japan	
Win	8–2	Tadao Yasuda	Submission (arm-triangle choke)	UFO - Legend	August 8, 2002	1	2:46	Tokyo, Japan	
Loss	7–2	Mirko Cro Cop	TKO (doctor stoppage)	K-1 Andy Memorial 2001 Japan GP Final	August 19, 2001	1	0:39	Saitama, Japan	
Win	7–1	Yoshihiro Takayama	Submission (arm-triangle choke)	Pride 14 - Clash of the Titans	May 27, 2001	2	3:10	Yokohama, Japan	
Win	6–1	Gilbert Yvel	Decision (unanimous)	Pride 12 - Cold Fury	December 9, 2000	2	10:00	Saitama, Japan	
Win	5–1	Ken Shamrock	TKO (corner stoppage)	Pride 10 - Return of the Warriors	August 27, 2000	1	6:46	Tokorozawa, Saitama, Japan	
Loss	4–1	Mark Coleman	TKO (corner stoppage)	PRIDE Grand Prix 2000 Finals	May 1, 2000	1	0:02	Tokyo, Japan	PRIDE 2000 Openweight Grand Prix Semifinals
Win	4–0	Mark Kerr	Decision (unanimous)	PRIDE Grand Prix 2000 Finals	May 1, 2000	1	15:00	Tokyo, Japan	PRIDE 2000 Openweight Grand Prix Quarterfinals
Win	3–0	Will Childs	Submission (rear-naked choke)	Extreme Shootout - The Underground	April 1, 2000	N/A	N/A	Killeen, Texas, United States	Extreme Shootout - The Underground Tournament Finals
Win	2–0	Dan Chase	KO (punch)	Extreme Shootout - The Underground	April 1, 2000	N/A	N/A	Killeen, Texas, United States	Extreme Shootout - The Underground Tournament Semifinals
Win	1–0	Hans Nijman	Submission (neck crank)	PRIDE Grand Prix 2000 Opening Round	January 30, 2000	1	2:48	Tokyo, Japan	PRIDE 2000 Openweight Grand Prix 1st Round

== Filmography ==
Year	Title	Role
2001	Di Gi Charat - A Trip to the Planet	Dejiko's father (voice)
