= Mitsuya Nagai =

Japanese mixed martial arts fighter and professional wrestler

Mitsuya Nagai 長井満也
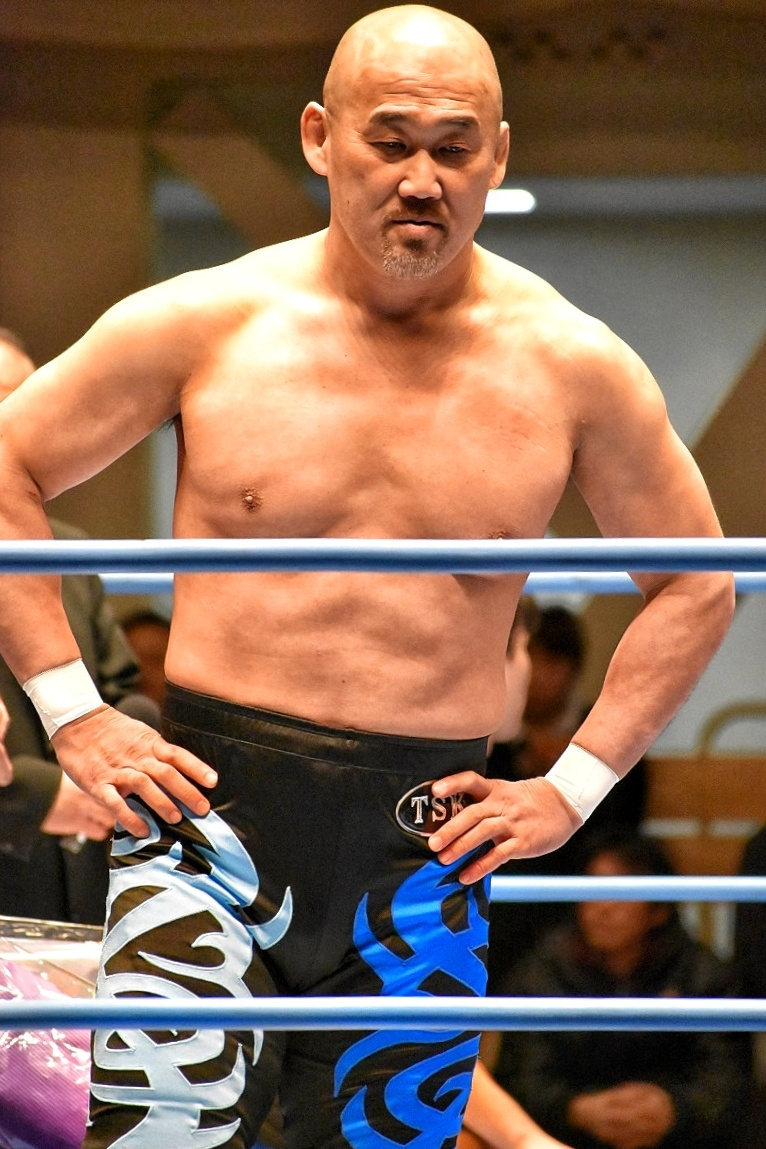
- Nagai in November 2019
- Born: 10 November 1968 (age 57); Sunagawa, Hokkaido, Japan
- Other names: Mitsuyaman; Makai #5; Great Tiger
- Height: 1.85 m (6 ft 1 in)
- Weight: 108 kg (238 lb; 17.0 st)
- Division: Middleweight
- Style: Shootboxing, shoot wrestling
- Team: RINGS Japan
- Teachers: Akira Maeda; Satoru Sayama; Naoyuki Taira
- Years active: 1991–2013 (MMA) 1997–1999 (kickboxing) 1999–present (professional wrestling)

Kickboxing record
- Total: 7
- Wins: 0
- By knockout: 0
- Losses: 6
- By knockout: 4
- No contests: 1

Mixed martial arts record
- Total: 26
- Wins: 18
- By knockout: 4
- By submission: 14
- Losses: 8
- By knockout: 3
- By submission: 3
- Unknown: 2

Other information
- Mixed martial arts record from Sherdog
- Last updated on: 8 January 2014

Hirokazu Nagai (長井 弘和, Nagai Hirokazu; born 10 November 1968), better known as Mitsuya Nagai (長井満也, Nagai Mitsuya), is a Japanese professional wrestler and former mixed martial artist and kickboxer. A professional MMA competitor from 1991 until 2013, he fought the majority of his career in Fighting Network RINGS. Once a student of legendary professional wrestlers Satoru Sayama and Akira Maeda, Nagai holds notable victories over former King of Pancrase Super Heavyweight Champion Tsuyoshi Kosaka, Nobuaki Kakuda, four-time world kickboxing champion Andre Mannaart, Russian sambo champion Mikhail Ilyukhin, RINGS King of Kings 2000 Tournament runner up Valentijn Overeem, ADCC bronze medallist and RINGS Light Heavyweight title contender Chris Haseman, and Pancrase veteran Takaku Fuke. He also fought for K-1 in kickboxing.

He later transitioned to traditional puroresu and notably wrestled for Battlarts, New Japan Pro-Wrestling (NJPW) and All Japan Pro Wrestling (AJPW), where he is a former three time All Asia Tag Team Champion. He currently performs on a part-time basis and has competed for shoot style and MMA promotion GLEAT and Pro Wrestling Noah.

== Mixed martial arts career ==
Hirokazu trained in Satoru Sayama's Super Tiger Gym during secondary school and tried to join All Japan Pro Wrestling immediately afterwards, but its chairman Giant Baba asked him to finish high school first. While studying, Nagai started competing in amateur shootboxing and amassed a 5–2 record, which made him change his ambition, so after graduating he went to join UWF Newborn instead of AJPW. He became a trainee under Akira Maeda, training in the shoot wrestling style, but he got injured and UWF closed his doors before he could debut. Nagai eventually followed Maeda to his new promotion, Fighting Network RINGS.

=== Fighting Network RINGS (1991–1997) ===
Nagai debuted in RINGS on 1 August 1991, in a match against Herman Renting. He revealed himself as a promising rookie, showing will and toughness, but aside of a high-profile shoot match against Gerard Gordeau on 7 December, in which he was defeated in 0:34, Nagai was relegated to low profile matches. He qualified for the Mega Battle Tournament 1991, but was eliminated on the first round by Masaaki Satake. During his time at RINGS, Nagai competed in shoot style wrestling matches, shoot fights and mixed martial arts fights. He competed in a number of shoot contests during the early years of RINGS where he was defeated by Dick Vrij on 16 May 1992, by TKO, and would also lose to Willie Peeters on 16 July 1992, however he got notable KO victories against Koichiro Kimura and Nobuhiro Tsurumaki, and a decision win against Nobuaki Kakuda.

In 1994, Nagai looked to ascend the scale by taking part on the Mega Battle Tournament 1994, eliminating Ameran Bitsadze on the first round, but then losing to Chris Dolman in the second. By 1995, RINGS was transitioning into a mixed martial arts promotion, and he faced Dick Vrij in a shoot rematch held in RINGS Holland on 19 February 1995, but he fell knocked by a knee strike while Vrij was illegally holding the ropes in the corner, an action which went unnoticed or the referee, and the decision was not overturned. However, Mitsuya would get booked for a trend of victories back in Japan, beating the likes of Andrei Kopylov, Yoshihisa Yamamoto and Carl Greco. He finally would get his retribution over Vrij submitting him via heel hook in an MMA fight on 24 August 1996. Nagai then fought Tsuyoshi Kohsaka, overwhelming the judoka with kicks, palm strikes, body punches and knees while Kohsaka fended off the strikes with takedowns and submission attempts. However, when the fight was brought back to standing Nagai beat him with knees, earning a TKO victory and one of the biggest wins of his RINGS career. He then got another MMA victory against Willie Peeters, winning via heel hook, but his momentum got cut short by a submission loss to Kiyoshi Tamura at the Mega Battle Tournament 1996. In 1997, Nagai competed in several MMA fights, losing his first three, with two of those losses coming via mismatched contests against heavyweight fighter Joop Kasteel. He then got notable wins against Valentijn Overeem, Andre Mannaart and Chris Haseman, all by heel hook.

In 1997, Nagai got a license by the All Japan Kickboxing Federation and competed at the Kick Over IX event as a RINGS representative. It would be his last year in the promotion, as he left RINGS after a match with Akira Maeda in which Maeda shot on him after the bell, although it is possible it could have been a worked shoot.

=== Kickboxing and later MMA career (1997–2013) ===
After leaving RINGS Nagai briefly pursued a career in kickboxing, and fought in K-1 between 1997 and 1999. His kickboxing career was unsuccessful, and he retired with a record of 6 losses and 1 draw in August 1999. In March 2013, Nagai returned to MMA after 15 years away from the sport, beating Takaku Fuke by ankle lock in the first round at a U-SPIRITS event.

== Professional wrestling career ==
=== Battlarts (1999–2000) ===
Nagai turned his hand to professional wrestling and joined Yuki Ishikawa's shoot style promotion Battlarts. His run was somewhat successful, with Nagai earning victories over established wrestlers like Takeshi Ono, Yuki Ishikawa and Katsumi Usuda. In the 2000 Young Generation Battle, Nagai went undefeated for the entirety of the tournament, beating Usuda, Mohammed Yone, Mach Junji, Rastaman and Minoru Tanaka to reach the final, where he lost to Alexander Otsuka. After Battlarts went on hiatus beginning in November 2000, Nagai and the rest of the roster were forced to leave the promotion.

=== All Japan Pro Wrestling (2001–2005) ===
Almost immediately after Battlarts began its hiatus, Nagai was announced for the 2000 Real World Tag League in All Japan Pro Wrestling (AJPW), the promotion he had originally hoped to join in high school. Nagai was paired up with fellow UWF alumnus Masahito Kakihara, calling themselves "Team Strongs". Despite the name, Team Strongs performed poorly in the tag league, earning just two points with a win over Barry Windham and Kendall Windham. In only his second match, Nagai lost to AJPW's top star Toshiaki Kawada, and, even though he lost, he earned Kawada's respect and was selected to be his new tag partner. As a newcomer, Nagai was required to prove himself before he entered the 2001 Champion Carnival, and thus was put into the Champion Carnival Qualifying League. Nagai excelled in the qualification league which granted him entry to the Champion Carnival where he struggled, again earning just one win and two points. Despite mixed success and his newcomer status, Nagai was pushed as an All Japan loyalist and represented the company in interpromotional matches during AJPW's working relationship with New Japan Pro-Wrestling (NJPW).

On 6 June 2001, Nagai was involved in an incident during a match against NJPW wrestler Takashi Iizuka at an NJPW show, where Nagai delivered a kick to Iizuka's face which resulted in Iizuka being severely concussed and needing over a year off to recover. Two days later when the NJPW roster came to the AJPW show in Nippon Budokan, Nagai and Kakihara beat NJPW's Yuji Nagata and Shinya Makabe to win the vacant All Asia Tag Team Championship, however, their reign was cut short after Kakihara suffered a knee injury and eventually left All Japan for NJPW after he had recovered, effectively breaking up Team Strongs. Nevertheless, Nagai's position as a loyalist in the post-exodus era All Japan continued to rise, and he teamed with Toshiaki Kawada in a loss to TenCozy (Hiroyoshi Tenzan and Satoshi Kojima) on 16 September on an NJPW card. Nagai teamed up with Kawada again for the 2001 Real World Tag League, seeing much greater success than the previous year, earning 10 points and making it to the final where they lost to Keiji Mutoh and Taiyo Kea. In early 2002, he entered the Giant Baba Memorial Cup, a tournament focused on young wrestlers where he dominated, earning 24 points and beating Nobutaka Araya in the final to win the tournament. Not long after winning, he entered the 2002 Champion Carnival and performed respectably, earning 6 points but failing to reach the final. In what would be his final tour with All Japan, Nagai partnered with Yoji Anjo for the 2002 Real World Tag League, earning 4 points and failing to reach the final.

After 2 years with the promotion, Nagai left All Japan in December 2002.

=== New Japan Pro-Wrestling (2003–2005) ===
==== Makai Club (2003–2004) ====
Immediately after leaving AJPW, Nagai was signed by New Japan Pro-Wrestling (NJPW), whom he had previously worked for during the inter-promotional relationship between both promotions. Due to his background in kickboxing and Rings, Nagai was placed into the Makai Club, a group of wrestlers with legitimate backgrounds in martial arts. Nagai debuted under a mask as Makai #5 at Wrestling World 2003, teaming with the returning Katsuyori Shibata, who was now masked and competing as Makai #4. In their debut as a team, the two defeated Nagai's former partner Masahito Kakihara and Takashi Iizuka. After defeating Kakihara in singles action at Ryogoku Kokugikan in February, Makai #5 voluntarily unmasked himself as Nagai, though he continued to compete as both himself and Makai #5 after this. In July, Makai #5 and #4, who had dubbed themselves Halimao'z (破悧魔王'Z, Harimaozu, "Devil Demon King'z"), challenged for the IWGP Tag Team Championship, losing to reigning champions Hiroshi Tanahashi and Yutaka Yoshie in Osaka. Nagai competed at Wrestling World 2004, teaming with Makai #1, Ryushi Yanagisawa and Ryota Chikuzen to defeat the Crazy Dogs (Enson Inoue, Hiro Saito, Michiyoshi Ohara and Tatsutoshi Goto). Nagai would compete twice at NJPW's King of Sports pay-per-view in March, first teaming with Shibata, #1 and Yanagisawa to defeat Blue Wolf, Shinya Makabe, Toru Yano and Yutaka Yoshie, but later losing to Josh Barnett in a singles match.

==== Face turn and team with Naruse (2004–2006) ====
After the Makai Club broke up in the summer of 2004, Nagai began a face turn, returning to AJPW for one night only on 22 July where he lost to his mentor Toshiaki Kawada. It was also during this time that he aligned himself with fellow Rings alumni Masayuki Naruse, with the two unsuccessfully challenging Genichiro Tenryu and Masanobu Fuchi for the All Asia Tag Team Championship on 26 July. Around this time, Nagai joined Black New Japan while keeping his team with Naruse, which caused friction between them. On 3 November at Masahiro Chono's 20th Anniversary Show, they challenged once again, this time beating Fuchi and Tenryu to win the titles. He also returned to AJPW in December, teaming with Kawada for the Real World Tag League. They made it to the playoffs, where a loss to a RO&D (Jamal and Taiyo Kea) stopped them from reaching the final. After dropping the All Asia belts in February, Nagai suffered an injury competing against Naruse in March which would keep him out of action for the rest of 2005. In January 2006, Nagai was one of a number of New Japan wrestlers who opted not to renew their contracts with the promotion and became a freelancer.

=== Freelancing (2006–present) ===
After leaving New Japan, Nagai debuted for Dramatic Dream Team (DDT), choosing a lighter schedule in a comedy promotion which would allow his injury to heal at a quicker rate. He aligned himself with Poison Sawada Julie's Serpent Council in late 2006, and also began competing for Tatsumi Fujinami's Muga World Pro Wrestling around this time. It was in MUGA Nagai would find his new home, competing regularly for the next few years while also making occasional appearances in DDT and various shoot style promotions such as Battlarts and Daisuke Ikeda's Fu-Ten. In February 2009, he wrestled Canadian wrestler Test in what would be Test's last match before he died the following month.

In September 2010, he beat Alexander Otsuka to win Real Japan Pro Wrestling (RJPW)'s Legend Championship. He held the title for nearly a year before dropping it to Super Tiger in July 2011. Nagai won it back from Tiger in March 2012, and again dropped it to Tiger in December. In January 2014, Nagai's appearances in Dradition became more sporadic, and he instead became a regular in All Japan Pro Wrestling (AJPW) once again, forming the Dark Kingdom stable with Kenso, which would later add Black Tiger VII, Black Tiger and Takeshi Minamino to its ranks. As Dark Kingdom, Nagai and Minamino won the All Asia Tag Team Championship in January 2015. They dropped the titles to Ultimo Dragon and Yoshinobu Kanemaru in March.

Nagai would later debut and make Pro Wrestling Noah his home in late 2017, entering the 2017 Global League where a loss to Naomichi Marufuji stopped him from reaching the final.

== Fighting style ==
As a fighter, Nagai utilized his shootboxing background and made use of precise kicks, knees and body punches before engaging in clinch fighting. Owing to his shoot wrestling influence, he showed excellent knowledge of leglocks and often used single and double-leg takedown attempts to transition into leglock battles, notably winning several fights by heel hook. As he wasn't the strongest fighter in RINGS, he operated an efficient bottom grappling game centered around his flexibility and ability to transition to submission attempts from unlikely positions.

== Championships and accomplishments ==
- All Japan Pro Wrestling

- All Asia Tag Team Championship (3 times) - with Masahito Kakihara (1), Masayuki Naruse (1), and Takeshi Minamino (1)
- Giant Baba Memorial Cup (2002)

- Chō Sentō Puroresu FMW
  - FMW World Street Fight 8-Man Tag Team Championship (1 time, current) – with Black Tiger V, Black Tiger VII and Tiger Mask III Tigre en Mascarado
- Muga World Pro Wrestling

- Muga Premium Tournament (2006)

- Real Japan Pro Wrestling

- Legend Championship (2 times)

== Mixed martial arts record ==
Professional record breakdown
26 matches	18 wins	8 losses
By knockout	4	3
By submission	14	4
By decision	0	0
Unknown	0	1

Res.	Record	Opponent	Method	Event	Date	Round	Time	Location	Notes
Win	18–8	Takaku Fuke	Submission (ankle lock)	U-Spirits - Again	9 March 2013	1	8:46	Tokyo, Japan	
Loss	17–8	Akira Maeda	N/A	Rings - Mega Battle Tournament 1997 Final	27 January 1998	N/A	N/A	Tokyo, Japan	
Win	17–7	Chris Haseman	Submission (heel hook)	Rings - Mega Battle Tournament 1997 Semifinal 1	25 October 1997	1	9:18	Tokyo, Japan	
Win	16–7	Mikhail Simov	Submission (kneebar)	Rings - Rings Fighting Extension 6	13 August 1997	1	6:38	Kagoshima, Japan	
Loss	15–7	Yoshihisa Yamamoto	Submission (armbar)	Rings - Fighting Extension 5	22 July 1997	1	2:27	Tokyo, Japan	
Win	15–6	Andre Mannaart	Submission (heel hook)	Rings - Fighting Extension 4	26 June 1997	1	0:20	Tokyo, Japan	
Win	14–6	Valentijn Overeem	Submission (heel hook)	Rings - Fighting Extension 3	23 May 1997	1	4:58	Sendai, Japan	
Loss	13–6	Joop Kasteel	TKO (lost points)	Rings - Extension Fighting 2	22 April 1997	1	6:27	Osaka, Japan	
Loss	13–5	Joop Kasteel	KO (punches)	Rings Holland - The Final Challenge	2 February 1997	1	5:12	Amsterdam, Netherlands	
Loss	13–4	Nikolai Zouev	Submission (ankle lock)	Rings - Budokan Hall 1997	22 January 1997	1	13:01	Tokyo, Japan	
Loss	13–3	Kiyoshi Tamura	Submission (scarf hold armlock)	Rings - Battle Dimensions Tournament 1996 Final	22 November 1996	1	6:13	Osaka, Japan	
Win	13–2	Willie Peeters	Submission (heel hook)	Rings - Battle Dimensions Tournament 1996 Opening Round	25 October 1996	1	9:36	Tokyo, Japan	
Win	12–2	Tsuyoshi Kosaka	TKO (knees)	Rings - Maelstrom 7	25 September 1996	1	11:05	Sapporo, Japan	
Win	11–2	Dick Vrij	Submission (heel hook)	Rings - Maelstrom 6	24 August 1996	1	6:16	Tokyo, Japan	
Loss	10–2	Volk Han	Submission (rear-naked choke)	Rings - Maelstrom 4	29 June 1996	1	11:47	Tokyo, Japan	
Win	10–1	Glenn Brown	Submission (rear-naked choke)	Rings - Maelstrom 2	26 April 1996	1	0:40	Osaka, Japan	
Win	9–1	Mikhail Ilyukhin	KO (palm strike)	Rings - Maelstrom 1	25 March 1996	1	11:24	Niigata, Japan	
Win	8–1	Ruud Ewoldt	TKO (retirement)	Rings Holland - Kings of Martial Arts	18 February 1996	2	2:12	Amsterdam, Netherlands	
Win	7–1	Tony Halme	Submission (kneebar)	Rings - Budokan Hall 1996	24 January 1996	1	8:58	Tokyo, Japan	
Win	6–1	Nikolai Zouev	Submission (guillotine choke)	Rings - Mega Battle Tournament 1995	19 December 1995	1	14:04	Osaka, Japan	
Win	5–1	Bakouri Gogitidze	Submission (kneebar)	Rings - Battle Dimensions Tournament 1995 Opening Round	21 October 1995	1	6:38	Tokyo, Japan	
Win	4–1	Peter Oele	Submission (ankle lock)	Rings Rising Series - Nagatsuki	22 September 1995	1	7:42	Sapporo, Japan	
Win	3–1	Willie Peeters	Submission (rear-naked choke)	Rings Rising Series - Uzuki	28 April 1995	1	5:34	Osaka, Japan	
Win	2–1	Yoshihisa Yamamoto	Submission (achilles lock)	Rings Rising Series - Yayoi	18 March 1995	1	17:18	Tokyo, Japan	
Loss	1–1	Dick Vrij	KO (knee)	Rings Holland - Free Fight	19 February 1995	1	3:07	Amsterdam, Netherlands	
Win	1–0	Mark Ashford	TKO (kicks)	Rings - Budokan Hall 1995	25 January 1995	1	8:11	Tokyo, Japan	

=== Mixed rules ===
Professional record breakdown
11 matches	6 wins	4 losses
By knockout	2	3
By submission	2	0
By decision	2	1
Draws	1	

Res.	Record	Opponent	Method	Event	Date	Round	Time	Location	Notes
Draw	6–4–1	Vladimir Klementiev	Draw	Rings Megaton Fight 1994	17 October 1994	6	18:00	Tokyo, Japan	
Win	6–4	Mikhail Simov	Submission	Rings Korakuen Experimental League 1993 Round 6	6 February 1994	3	1:32	Tokyo, Japan	
Win	5–4	Yoshinori Nishi	Decision (unanimous)	Rings Korakuen Experimental League 1993 Round 3	9 June 1993	5	15:00	Tokyo, Japan	
Win	4–4	Nobuhiro Tsurumaki	KO (knees)	Rings Korakuen Experimental League 1993 Round 2	30 April 1993	2	0:37	Tokyo, Japan	
Win	3–4	Sandor Telgen	Submission (toe hold)	Rings Korakuen Experimental League 1993 Round 1	28 February 1993	1	5:27	Tokyo, Japan	
Loss	2–4	Masaaki Satake	KO (palm strike)	Rings - Mega Battle Tournament 1992 First Round	29 October 1992	1	1:24	Nagoya, Japan	
Loss	2–3	Willie Peeters	Decision (unanimous)	Rings - Mega Battle VI	16 July 1992	5	15:00	Osaka, Japan	
Win	2–2	Nobuaki Kakuda	Decision (unanimous)	Rings Mega Battle 5th - Shishiku	25 June 1992	5	15:00	Sendai, Japan	
Loss	1–2	Dick Vrij	TKO (palm strike)	Rings - Mega Battle IV	16 May 1992	1	6:11	Tokyo, Japan	
Win	1–1	Koichiro Kimura	KO (palm strikes and knees)	Rings Mega Battle 1st - Kaiten	25 January 1992	1	28:05	Urayasu, Japan	
Loss	0–1	Gerard Gordeau	TKO	Rings Astral Step Final - Blaze Up	7 December 1991	4	0:34	Tokyo, Japan	

== Kickboxing record ==
Kickboxing record
0 wins, 6 losses, 1 draw
Date	Result	Opponent	Event	Location	Method	Round	Time	Record
22 August 1999	Loss	Musashi	K-1 Spirits '99	Tokyo, Japan	KO (left mid kick)	1	3:00	0-6-1
22 August 1999	Loss	Ryuji Murakami	K-1 Spirits '99	Tokyo, Japan	Decision (unanimous)	2	3:00	0-5-1
3 February 1999	Loss	Andre Mannaart	K-1 Rising '99	Tokyo, Japan	KO (right punch)	2	1:20	0-4
28 October 1998	Loss	Jan Nortje	K-1 Japan '98 Kamikaze	Tokyo, Japan	TKO (punch)	1	2:51	0-3
28 August 1998	Loss	Tsuyoshi Nakasako	K-1 Bushido '98	Tokyo, Japan	TKO (left high kick)	2	2:55	0-2
28 September 1997	Loss	Reed	Japan Kickboxing Federation - Kick Over IX	Tokyo, Japan	Decision (unanimous)	3	5:00	0-1
Legend: Win Loss Draw/No contest
