= Hisashi Shinma =

Japanese businessperson (1935–2025)

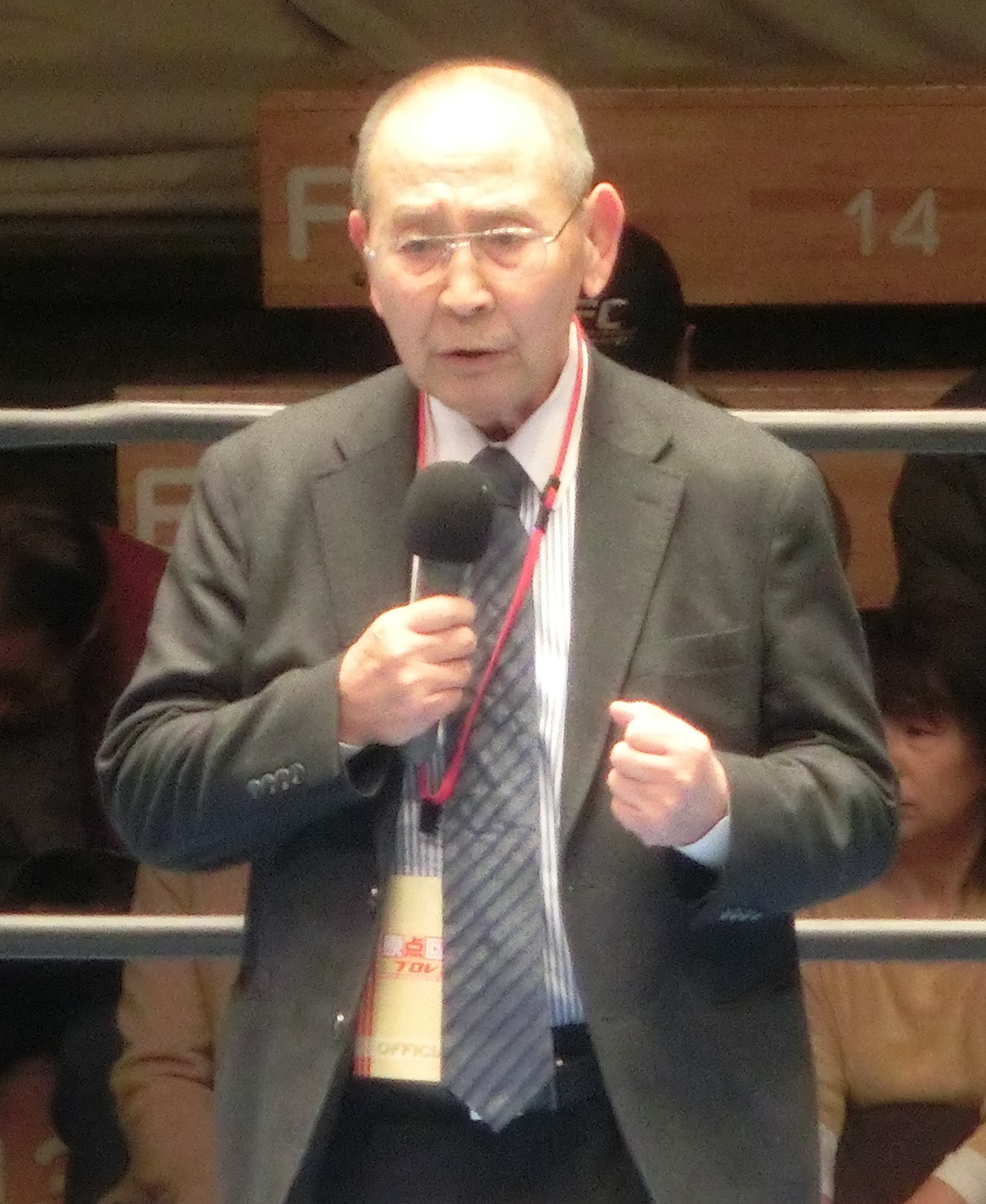
- Shinma in 2017
- Born: March 22, 1935; Tokyo, Japan
- Died: April 21, 2025 (aged 90); Tokyo, Japan
- Education: Chuo University
- Occupations: Executive Chairman of New Japan Pro Wrestling; Businessman, Booker

Hisashi Shinma (新間 寿, Shinma Hisashi; March 22, 1935 – April 21, 2025) was a Japanese professional wrestling booker and professional wrestling promoter. Shinma is noted for having been an on-screen authority for the World Wrestling Federation, from 1978 to 1984, billed as the President of the promotion. He was succeeded by Jack Tunney.

== Career ==
Shinma was chairman and one of the bookers for New Japan Pro-Wrestling at the time and negotiated a talent-sharing arrangement with the World Wrestling Federation within the junior heavyweight division, which ultimately launched Tatsumi Fujinami as an international superstar and an eventual successor to Antonio Inoki.

Shinma's most famous moment as WWF President occurred on December 6, 1979, after Bob Backlund regained the WWF title from Antonio Inoki at the end of his Japan tour. Shinma overruled the decision due to interference from Tiger Jeet Singh. Inoki refused to accept the belt, but Backlund regained the vacant title after returning to the United States. Backlund's title loss to Inoki is still not officially acknowledged by WWE and largely unknown to American audiences until Pro Wrestling Illustrated recognized Inoki's reign in the late-1990s.

Shinma's other accomplishments included fitting Satoru Sayama with the Tiger Mask gimmick, discovering Akira Maeda, advocated the concept of the International Wrestling Grand Prix (IWGP) in NJPW and forming the Universal Wrestling Federation in Japan after leaving New Japan. Shinma remained in UWF until disagreements arose with Sayama over the match content.

His son Hisatsune Shinma was also a promoter, and co-founded Universal Lucha Libre with Gran Hamada, one of the original UWF members, but with the promotion focusing on the lucha libre style brought from Mexico.

In his later years, Shinma was active as the chairman of Real Japan Pro Wrestling. When RJPW evolved into Strong Style Pro Wrestling, he became their representative director. He retired in October 2024.

== Death ==
In March 2025, Shinma was admitted to a Tokyo hospital for COVID-19. Although he recovered and was discharged, he developed pneumonia and died at his home on April 21, 2025, at the age of 90.

== Championships and accomplishments ==
- Tokyo Sports
  - Lifetime Achievement Award (1983)
- Wrestling Observer Newsletter
  - Wrestling Observer Newsletter Hall of Fame (Class of 1996)
- WWE
  - WWE Hall of Fame (Class of 2019)
