= Victor Koga =

Japanese-Russian martial artist and trainer

- Born: 1935; Hailar, Hulunbuir, Manchukuo
- Died: November 3, 2018 (aged 82–83); Tokyo, Japan
- Nationality: Japanese
- Style: Sambo
- Team: Koga Dojo
- Rank: Master of Sports in sambo Black belt in judo
- Years active: 1965–2018

Victor Shoichi Koga (1935 – November 3, 2018) was a Japanese-Russian martial artist and trainer. He introduced the martial art of sambo in Japan and was one of its main exponents until his death.

== Biography ==
Koga was born in Manchuria, to a Japanese father and a Russian mother. After the end of World War II, his family moved to Kyushu, Japan, and the young Victor was sent to live with relatives in Tokyo. There he started his martial career by joining the amateur wrestling club of Nihon University, where he was studying medicine. His wrestling tenure was successful, including distinguished participations in the National Sports Festival of Japan and the All-Japan Wrestling Championship. After graduating, he also trained judo in Riichiro Watanabe's dojo in Yokosuka.

In 1965, becoming interested in the Russian martial art of sambo, Koga associated with fellow judoka and wrestler Ichiro Hatta in order to pioneer it in Japan. After forming the Japanese Sambo Federation, Koga moved to Soviet Union to learn personally the style. He traveled to many countries to teach before returning to Japan, creating multiple sambo schools. In 1975, in acknowledgement of his efforts, he was granted the title of Master of Sports in sambo. One of his most famous students in Japan was Satoru Sayama, who went to open the first mixed martial arts promotion in the form of Shooto.

Koga died in November 2018.
