= Willie Peeters =

Dutch mixed martial arts fighter

- Born: 26 October 1965 (age 60); Nijmegen, Netherlands
- Height: 5 ft 9 in (1.75 m)
- Weight: 218 lb (99 kg; 15.6 st)
- Division: Heavyweight
- Style: Wrestling, Judo, Kickboxing, Kyokushin Karate, Sambo, Muay Thai
- Team: Dolman Gym; Rings Holland
- Teachers: Chris Dolman; Jan Lomulder; Fred Royer
- Years active: 1995 - 2000

Mixed martial arts record
- Total: 20
- Wins: 9
- By knockout: 6
- By submission: 1
- By decision: 2
- Losses: 10
- By knockout: 2
- By submission: 5
- Unknown: 3
- Draws: 1

Other information
- Mixed martial arts record from Sherdog

Willie Peeters (born 26 October 1965) is a Dutch mixed martial artist. He competed in the Heavyweight division.

== Biography ==
Peeters started his career in Wrestling at the age of ten, training with famed champion Freddy Winters and winning several junior competitions across Europe. At sixteen, he moved to the Oyama Gym in Amsterdam, where he trained Judo under Chris Dolman and Willem Ruska, as well as Kickboxing under Jan Lomulder, and finally Kyokushin Karate, winning a heavyweight championship. In 1991, after talking about his interest in mixed martial arts, Dolman invited him to his team in Fighting Network RINGS in order to compete in both MMA and professional wrestling in Japan.

Peeters would develop a rivalry with Wataru Sakata in a long series of shootfighting bouts. Peeters defeated Wataru by TKO on their first fight On 16 November 1995, and they went to fight a rematch on 29 June 1996. During the latter, Sakata released late a toehold, injuring Peeters, who retaliated by illegally knocking him out with a close-fisted punch, gaining a red card. Still, Peeters would win by KO due palm strikes. The two met again on 24 August, when Peeters dominated in a grappling contest and defeated Sakata north/south choke. Willie would face Sakata again under different rules in a RINGS Holland event on 8 February 1998, but although Wataru performed dominantly for the first time, he lost a controversial decision, as the Dutch referee invalidated a finishing hold by Sakata while allowing Peeters to throw illegal strikes. Peeters finally lost to Sakata on 27 June by ankle lock.

On 1 July 1999 Peeters fought in Brazilian promotion World Vale Tudo Championship against Antonio Carlos Ribiero. The match, which was lost by Peeters by doctor stoppage, saw copious amounts of blood and Willie biting his opponent, and it was followed by a brawl between their teams.

== Mixed martial arts record ==
Professional record breakdown
20 matches	9 wins	10 losses
By knockout	6	2
By submission	1	5
By decision	2	0
Unknown	0	3
Draws	1	

Res.	Record	Opponent	Method	Event	Date	Round	Time	Location	Notes
Loss	9–10–1	Heath Herring	Submission (rear-naked choke)	Pride 9	4 June 2000	1	0:48	Nagoya, Japan	
Win	9–9–1	Yasuhito Namekawa	TKO (knee to the body)	Rings Holland: There Can Only Be One Champion	6 February 2000	2	4:56	Utrecht, Netherlands	
Draw	8–9–1	Peter Varga	Draw	BOA 1: Battle of Arnhem 1	5 September 1999	0	0:00	Netherlands	
Loss	8–9	Chris Haseman	Submission (kneebar)	Rings: Rise 5th	19 August 1999	1	3:13	Japan	
Loss	8–8	Antonio Carlos Ribeiro	TKO (cut)	WVC 8: World Vale Tudo Championship 8	1 July 1999	1	5:56	Aruba	
Loss	8–7	Ryuki Ueyama	TKO (lost points)	Rings: Rise 4th	24 June 1999	3	3:05	Japan	
Loss	8–6	Wataru Sakata	Submission	Rings: Fourth Fighting Integration	27 June 1998	1	1:45	Tokyo, Japan	
Win	8–5	Wataru Sakata	Decision (unanimous)	Rings Holland: The King of Rings	8 February 1998	2	5:00	Amsterdam, North Holland, Netherlands	
Loss	7–5	Sean Alvarez	N/A	Rings: Mega Battle Tournament 1997 Semifinal	23 December 1997	1	9:40	Japan	
Win	7–4	Sergei Sousserov	KO (palm strikes)	Rings Holland: The Final Challenge	2 February 1997	1	4:51	Amsterdam, North Holland, Netherlands	
Loss	6–4	Tom Erikson	Submission (neck crank)	MARS: Martial Arts Reality Superfighting	22 November 1996	1	0:31	Birmingham, Alabama, United States	
Win	6–3	Serge Narsisyan	TKO (corner stoppage)	MARS: Martial Arts Reality Superfighting	22 November 1996	1	5:10	Birmingham, Alabama, United States	
Loss	5–3	Mitsuya Nagai	N/A	Rings: Battle Dimensions Tournament 1996 Opening Round	25 October 1996	0	0:00		
Win	5–2	Wataru Sakata	Submission (neck lock)	Rings: Maelstrom 6	24 August 1996	1	18:31	Japan	
Win	4–2	Eduardo Rocha	TKO (submission to punches)	CFT 2: Cage Fight Tournament 2	21 April 1996	1	1:51	Netherlands	
Win	3–2	Hubert Numrich	TKO (punches and headbutts)	CFT 2: Cage Fight Tournament 2	21 April 1996	1	2:06	Netherlands	
Win	2–2	Allen Harris	TKO (punches)	CFT 2: Cage Fight Tournament 2	21 April 1996	1	1:37	Netherlands	
Loss	1–2	Tsuyoshi Kosaka	Submission (rear-naked choke)	Rings Holland: Kings of Martial Arts	18 February 1996	2	0:12	Amsterdam, North Holland, Netherlands	
Loss	1–1	Chris Haseman	N/A	Rings: Budokan Hall 1996	24 January 1996	0	0:00	Tokyo, Japan	
Win	1–0	Masayuki Naruse	Decision (unanimous)	Rings Holland: Free Fight	19 February 1995	1	10:00	Amsterdam, North Holland, Netherlands	

== See also ==
- List of male mixed martial artists
