= Nikolai Zouev =

Russian mixed martial arts fighter (1958–2022)

- Born: 20 May 1958; Sverdlovsk, Russian SFSR, USSR
- Died: 21 May 2022 (aged 64); Luxor, Egypt
- Nationality: Russian
- Weight: 235 lb (107 kg; 16.8 st)
- Division: Heavyweight
- Years active: 1995–1999

Mixed martial arts record
- Total: 5
- Wins: 1
- Unknown: 1
- Losses: 4
- By submission: 2
- Unknown: 2

Other information
- Mixed martial arts record from Sherdog

Nikolai Nikolayevich Zouev (Russian: Николай Николаевич Зуев; 20 May 1958 – 21 May 2022) was a Russian mixed martial artist. He competed in the Heavyweight division.

== Career ==
He had a background in sambo and freestyle wrestling, starting a rivalry with Volk Han.

He debuted on 13 July 1993 at Fighting Network Rings "RINGS BATTLE DIMENSION '93" against Todor Todorov.

He spent most of his career in Fighting Network Rings in a variety of fighting codes including professional wrestling, Sambo and Mixed Martial Arts. He had multiple matches against his rival Volk Han and Mitsuya Nagai.

He stopped fighting for RINGS on 21 February 1999 in a loss against Magomedkhan Gamzatkhanov as the promotion was shifting towards only doing MMA matches.

He became a coach after his retirement, helping to train fighters such as Sergei Kharitonov.

Zouev died on 21 May 2022, a day after his 64th birthday, from years of heart disease.

== Mixed martial arts record ==
Professional record breakdown
5 matches	1 win	4 losses
By submission	0	2
Unknown	1	2

Res.	Record	Opponent	Method	Event	Date	Round	Time	Location	Notes
Loss	1-4	Magomedkhan Gamzatkhanov	Submission	Rings: Final Capture	21 February 1999	1	4:49	Japan	
Loss	1-3	Akira Maeda	Submission (rear naked choke)	Rings: Mega Battle Tournament 1997 Semifinal 1	25 October 1997	1	5:17	Japan	
Win	1-2	Mitsuya Nagai	N/A	Rings: Budokan Hall 1997	22 January 1997	0	0:00	Tokyo, Japan	
Loss	0-2	Tariel Bitsadze	N/A	Rings: Battle Dimensions Tournament 1996 Opening Round	25 October 1996	0	0:00		
Loss	0-1	Mikhail Ilyukhin	N/A	Rings: Battle Dimensions Tournament 1995 Opening Round	21 October 1995	0	0:00		

== See also ==
- List of male mixed martial artists
