= Yuji Sakuragi =

Japanese professional wrestler and mixed martial arts fighter

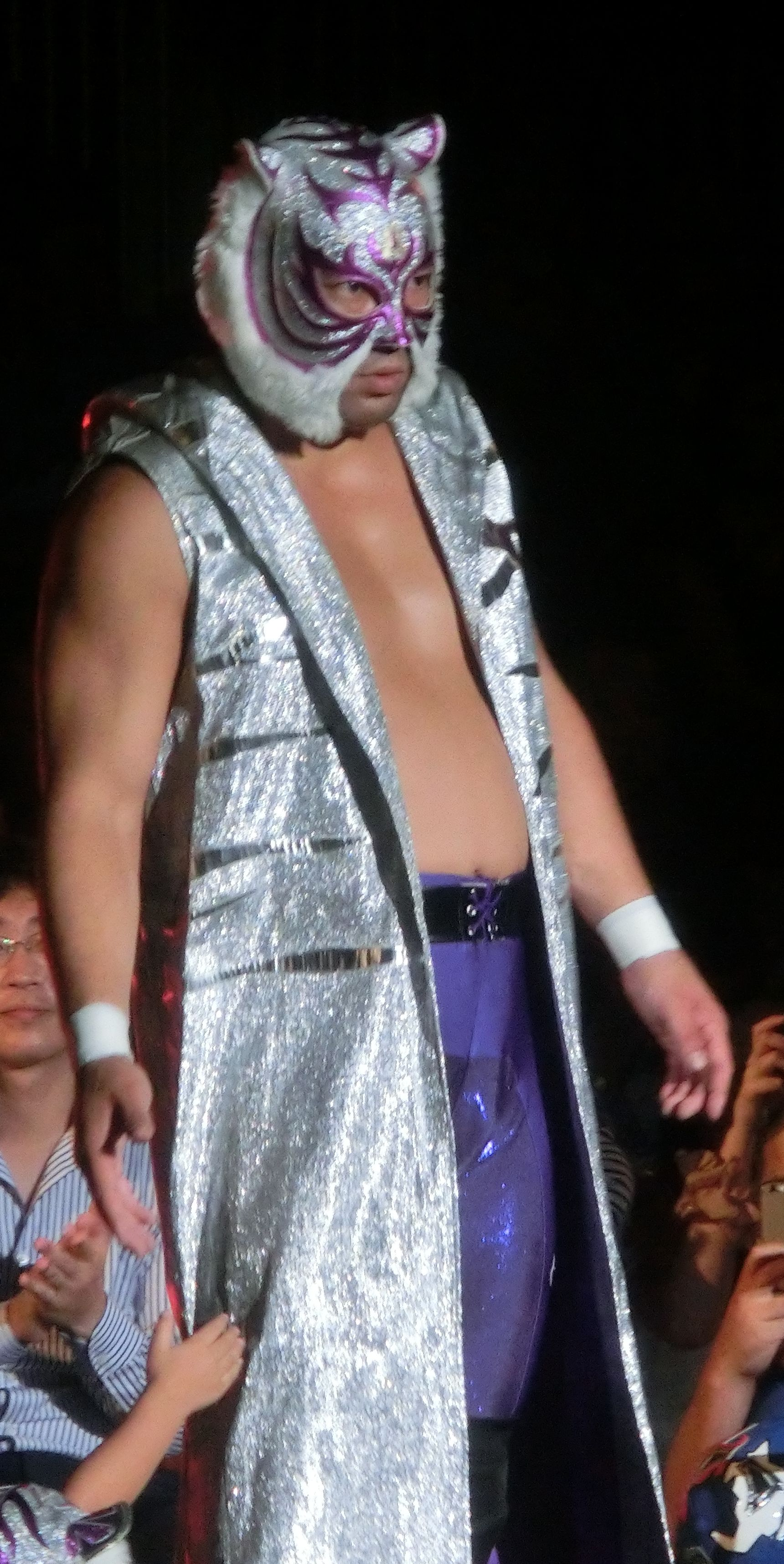
- Sakuragi as Super Tiger in September 2016
- Born: Yuji Sakuragi (桜木裕司, Sakuragi Yūji); July 20, 1977 (age 49); Miyazaki, Miyazaki Prefecture, Japan
- Other names: Super Tiger (II)
- Nationality: Japanese
- Height: 1.80 m (5 ft 11 in)
- Weight: 95 kg (209 lb; 15.0 st)
- Division: Heavyweight; Light Heavyweight; Middleweight
- Fighting out of: Miyazaki, Japan
- Team: Seikendo
- Teacher: Satoru Sayama
- Rank: Black belt in Kyokushin Karate
- Years active: 2000–present

Kickboxing record
- Total: 12
- Wins: 4
- By knockout: 1
- Losses: 8
- By knockout: 7

Mixed martial arts record
- Total: 44
- Wins: 16
- By knockout: 14
- By decision: 2
- Losses: 25
- By knockout: 9
- By submission: 8
- By decision: 8
- Draws: 2
- No contests: 1

Other information
- Mixed martial arts record from Sherdog
- Last updated on: January 8, 2014

Yuji Sakuragi (Japanese: 桜木裕司, Sakuragi Yūji; born July 20, 1977) is a Japanese mixed martial artist, kickboxer, and professional wrestler, currently associated with Real Japan Pro Wrestling (RJPW)'s team Seikendo. He is known for his Kyokushin Karate background and his ability to score KO wins. In MMA, he competed for the Pancrase, M-1 Global, and DEEP promotions.

Sakuragi wrestles under the name of Super Tiger, being the second incarnation of the name used by his trainer Satoru Sayama. He has also worked in promotions like All Japan Pro Wrestling (AJPW), Battlarts, Dramatic Dream Team (DDT) and Riki Choshu's Legend The Pro Wrestling.

== Early life ==
Yuji started training Kyokushin in middle school, and later joined the Japan Self-Defense Forces for a time. After his military tenure, he worked as a physical education teacher for the Nippon Sport Science University, where he met Satoru Sayama. Sakuragi moved to Sayama's Seikendo promotion and started training in order to be a professional mixed martial artist.

== Mixed martial arts career ==
In 2005, after some unimpressive fights abroad, Sakuragi made his debut in Seikendo's partner company Pancrase with a high note, knocking out Kengo Watanabe with a head kick. The victory, as well as his performance against veteran Kazuo "Yoshiki" Takahashi, made him shine in the indy MMA scene. He became famous for his Kyokushin background, exemplified by his refined striking and ability to score total KOs as opposed to TKOs or stoppages. Sakuragi was also famous for his flashy personal style, wearing hip hop and b-kei fashion, striking the military salute before his matches and paying his dues to the Yasukuni Shrine in special occasions.

In 2012, Sakuragi defeated Kazuo Takahashi at the promotion's Progress Tour event. The wrestling expert chose to trade strikes with Sakuragi, who landed a left hook at the second round and knocked him out cold, winning the fight.

On October 27, 2012, Sakuragi faced grappling expert Sanae Kikuta in a special fight in Grabaka under full vale tudo rules, without gloves and allowing elbows and headbutts. The bout was short, and saw Sakuragi landing a spinning back kick, sidestepping Kikuta's attempts to push him against the cage wall, and finally knocking him down with strikes.

Sakuragi's next matchups against grapplers wouldn't be so successful, as he was choked out by Daiju Takase at DEEP Haleo Impact and defeated by Ryuta Sakurai in an upset knockout by flying knee at Cage Impact 2013.

== Professional wrestling career ==
=== Real Japan Pro Wrestling (2007–present) ===
In 2007, Sakuragi made his transition to professional wrestling as part of Sayama's Real Japan Pro Wrestling (RJPW). He received the gimmick of Super Tiger II, the second incarnation of the character used by Sayama in Universal Wrestling Federation. Yuji wrestled under a purple and silver attire and mask, utilizing a style based around kicks and suplexes. His debut was against Ikuto Hidaka, a wrestler who had been especially approved by Sayama for Tiger II's debut, and later moved into a major feud with Tiger Shark.

Super Tiger challenged Alexander Otsuka for the RJPW Legend Championship in 2008, but he was defeated. Sakuragi then formed a steady team with Minoru Suzuki, getting victories over names like Yuki Ishikawa and Great Sasuke. In 2011, Super Tiger got finally the championship when he defeated Mitsuya Nagai in a title match. Tiger retained it successfully against Black Tiger V before trading the title once more with Nagai, and this time his reign was longer, defending it against Kazunari Murakami, Taka Kuno, Masashi Aoyagi and Great Tiger. However, he lost it in 2015, against Masakatsu Funaki.

=== Battlarts (2007–2011) ===
The year of his debut, Super Tiger started wrestling in shoot-style promotion Battlarts as a RJPW representative. Tiger formed a tag team with Katsumi Usuda and competed extensely for the company, briefly feuding with Mitsuya Nagai and Yuki Ishikawa. In 2008, he participated in the B1 Climax 2009 Block B, where he got big wins over Munenori Sawa, Usuda and Bison Tagai, and went to face Ishikawa in the block's final match, but he was defeated. Super Tiger then teamed up with his long time rival Tiger Shark, though they broke up shortly after. His last match in Battlarts was a tag team match with Chocoball Mukai as a special referee, teaming up with Sanshu Tsubakichi to face Ryuji Walter and Alexander Otsuka in a losing effort.

=== All Japan Pro Wrestling (2016–2017) ===
Sakuragi debuted in All Japan Pro Wrestling (AJPW) as a RJPW representative for the Champion Carnival 2016. He scored important victories over Jun Akiyama and Daisuke Sekimoto, but otherwise his success was little. He didn't stop appearing in AJPW after the league, however, aligning himself with Suwama's stable Evolution. On 27 August, he and Suwama challenged Daisuke Sekimoto and Yuji Okabayashi for the AJPW World Tag Team Championship, being defeated. In December, Super Tiger and fellow Evolution member Hikaru Sato competed at the Real World Tag League 2016, though scoring only one win.

=== Pro Wrestling Zero1 (2017–2019) ===
In 2017, Sakuragi switched AJPW by Pro Wrestling Zero1 (Zero1) as his main field. He participated in that year's Fire Festival, gaining high victories over Shogun Okamoto and Kohei Sato, but ultimately came short. He bounced back by winning the previously vacated Zero1 United National Heavyweight Championship against Hartley Jackson, which he retained until losing it in 2018 to Chris Vice. Super Tiger then repeated participation in the 2018 Fire Festival, achieving again important wins over names like Shinjiro Otani, Sugi and Hiroshi Yamato, and returned again after a hiatus at the 2019 edition, adding another win over Masato Tanaka.

== Championships and accomplishments ==
=== Kickboxing ===
- Universal Kickboxing Federation
  - UKF International Heavyweight Championship (1 time)

=== Mixed martial arts ===
- World Absolute Fighting Championship
  - WAFC Pankration Openweight Crown (2009)

=== Professional wrestling ===
- Pro Wrestling Illustrated
  - PWI ranked him #400 of the top 500 singles wrestlers in the PWI 500 in 2017
- Pro Wrestling Zero1
  - NWA United National Heavyweight Championship (1 time)
- Real Japan/Strong Style Pro-Wrestling
  - Legend Championship (5 times)
  - SSPW World Tag Team Champion (1 time, current) – with Masashi Takeda
- Pro-Wrestling A-Team
  - WEW Heavyweight Championship (2 times, current)
  - WEW World Tag Team Championship (2 times) – with Tomohiko Hashimoto and Kota Nagashima

== Mixed martial arts record ==
Professional record breakdown
44 matches	16 wins	25 losses
By knockout	14	9
By submission	0	8
By decision	2	8
Draws	2	
No contests	1	

Res.	Record	Opponent	Method	Event	Date	Round	Time	Location	Notes
Loss	16–25–2 (1)	Luis Santos	TKO (punches)	Real Fight Championship 4	March 12, 2016	1	1:27	Tokyo, Japan	
Win	16–24–2 (1)	Kang Chul Yoon	TKO (punches)	Real Fight Championship 3	December 5, 2015	2	0:19	Yokohama, Japan	Return to Heavyweight.
Loss	15–24–2 (1)	Alan Baudot	TKO (punches)	Grandslam MMA 3: Way of the Cage	September 12, 2015	1	2:35	Tokyo, Japan	Openweight bout.
Win	15–23–2 (1)	Shungo Oyama	TKO (corner stoppage)	Pancrase: 263	December 6, 2014	2	1:03	Tokyo, Japan	Openweight bout.
Loss	14–23–2 (1)	Aleksey Shapovalov	TKO (punches)	FEFoMP: Amur Challenge 6	March 31, 2014	1	4:15	Blagoveshchensk, Russia	
Loss	14–22–2 (1)	Kazuhiro Nakamura	Submission (arm-triangle choke)	DEEP: Cage Impact 2013	November 24, 2013	3	2:49	Tokyo, Japan	Catchweight (88 kg) bout.
Loss	14–21–2 (1)	Ryuta Sakurai	KO (punch and flying knee)	DEEP: Cage Impact 2013	June 15, 2013	1	1:04	Tokyo, Japan	Middleweight debut.
Loss	14–20–2 (1)	Daiju Takase	Submission (guillotine choke)	DEEP: Haleo Impact	December 22, 2012	2	1:33	Tokyo, Japan	
Win	14–19–2 (1)	Sanae Kikuta	KO (knee and soccer kick)	Grabaka Live 2	October 27, 2012	1	0:35	Tokyo, Japan	
Win	13–19–2 (1)	Kazuo Takahashi	KO (punch)	Pancrase: Progress Tour 9	August 5, 2012	1	4:59	Tokyo, Japan	
Loss	12–19–2 (1)	Shinso Anzai	Decision (unanimous)	Pancrase: Progress Tour 3	March 11, 2012	2	5:00	Tokyo, Japan	
Loss	12–18–2 (1)	Kazuhisa Tazawa	Submission (rear-naked choke)	DEEP: 52 Impact	February 25, 2011	2	0:54	Tokyo, Japan	For the vacant DEEP Openweight Championship.
Draw	12–17–2 (1)	Ryo Kawamura	Draw	Pancrase: Passion Tour 11	December 5, 2010	3	5:00	Tokyo, Japan	For the Pancrase Light Heavyweight Championship.
Loss	12–17–1 (1)	Alexander Grinchuk	Decision (unanimous)	FEFoMP: Impact League 4	October 16, 2010	3	5:00	Khabarovsk, Russia	Heavyweight bout.
Win	12–16–1 (1)	Ryo Kawamura	TKO (Punches)	Pancrase: Passion Tour 8	September 5, 2010	1	3:55	Tokyo, Japan	
Loss	11–16–1 (1)	Christian M'Pumbu	TKO (punches)	Deep: 46 Impact	February 28, 2010	1	2:29	Tokyo, Japan	DEEP Light Heavyweight Tournament Quarterfinal.
Win	11–15–1 (1)	Alavutdin Gadjiev	KO (knee)	FEFoMP: Impact League 2	October 17, 2009	1	0:30	Khabarovsk, Russia	
Loss	10–15–1 (1)	Hans Stringer	TKO (punches)	DEEP: 43 Impact	August 23, 2009	2	2:11	Tokyo, Japan	
Win	10–14–1 (1)	Minoru Kato	KO (punch)	DEEP: 41 Impact	April 17, 2009	2	0:59	Tokyo, Japan	Return to Light Heavyweight.
Loss	9–14–1 (1)	Rogent Lloret	Decision (unanimous)	M-1 Challenge 8: USA	October 29, 2008	2	0:59	Kansas City, United States	
Loss	9–13–1 (1)	Stefan Struve	Submission (triangle choke)	M-1 Challenge 6: Korea	August 29, 2008	1	2:30	Seoul, South Korea	
Loss	9–12–1 (1)	Kamil Uygun	TKO (punches)	M-1 Challenge 5: Japan	July 17, 2008	1	4:52	Tokyo, Japan	Light Heavyweight bout.
Loss	9–11–1 (1)	Besiki Gerenava	TKO (punches)	M-1 Challenge 2: Russia	April 3, 2008	2	5:00	Saint Petersburg, Russia	
Win	9–10–1 (1)	Kenichi Shinohara	TKO (punches)	MARS 11: 2nd Anniversary	February 2, 2008	1	1:34	Tokyo, Japan	Light Heavyweight bout.
Draw	8–10–1 (1)	Hidetada Irie	Draw	DEEP: 33 Impact	December 12, 2007	3	5:00	Tokyo, Japan	
Loss	8–10 (1)	Yuki Kondo	Decision (unanimous)	Pancrase: Rising 8	October 14, 2007	3	5:00	Tokyo, Japan	
Loss	8–9 (1)	Katsuhisa Fujii	Decision (majority)	DEEP: Glove	July 26, 2007	2	5:00	Tokyo, Japan	
Loss	8–8 (1)	Basil Yamilkhanov	TKO (doctor stoppage)	FEFoMP: Mayor Cup 2007	May 26, 2007	1	0:38	Khabarovsk, Russia	Lost the Mayor Cup Heavyweight Championship.
Win	8–7 (1)	Nikolai Onikienko	Decision (unanimous)	FEFoMP: Mayor Cup 2007	May 26, 2007	2	5:00	Khabarovsk, Russia	Return to Heavyweight. Won the Mayor Cup Heavyweight Championship.
Loss	7–7 (1)	Yasuhito Namekawa	Submission (heel hook)	Deep: 29 Impact	April 13, 2007	1	2:12	Tokyo, Japan	90 kg bout.
Win	7–6 (1)	Fabiano Aoki	TKO (injury)	MARS 6: Rapid Fire	December 22, 2006	2	1:55	Tokyo, Japan	97 kg bout.
NC	6–6 (1)	Fabiano Aoki	No Contest (accidental low blow)	MARS 5: Marching On	October 28, 2006	1	0:17	Tokyo, Japan	97 kg bout.
Loss	6–6	Tatsuya Mizuno	Submission (rear-naked choke)	Pancrase: Blow 7	September 17, 2006	2	2:30	Tokyo, Japan	
Loss	6–5	Riki Fukuda	Decision (unanimous)	Pancrase: 2006 Neo-Blood Tournament Finals	July 28, 2006	2	5:00	Yokohama, Japan	
Loss	6–4	Poai Suganuma	TKO (punches)	Pancrase: Blow 4	May 2, 2006	1	1:47	Yokohama, Japan	
Win	6–3	Hikaru Sato	TKO (soccer kicks)	Pancrase: Blow 1	January 26, 2006	1	0:55	Tokyo, Japan	
Win	5–3	Jimmy Akishige	KO (punch)	RJPW: Legend Championship	December 16, 2005	1	1:55	Tokyo, Japan	
Loss	4–3	Hideki Tadao	Submission (arm-triangle choke)	Pancrase: Spiral 8	October 2, 2005	2	3:33	Yokohama, Japan	
Win	4–2	Yuta Nakamura	Decision (unanimous)	Pancrase: Z	September 3, 2005	2	5:00	Kumamoto, Japan	
Win	3–2	Aslan Dzeboev	KO (body kick)	Pancrase: Spiral 6	July 31, 2005	2	1:31	Tokyo, Japan	
Loss	2–2	Kazuo Takahashi	Submission (armbar)	Pancrase: Spiral 5	July 10, 2005	2	3:01	Yokohama, Japan	
Win	2–1	Kengo Watanabe	KO (high kick)	Pancrase: Spiral 1	February 4, 2005	3	0:06	Tokyo, Japan	
Win	1–1	Sung Chu Kim	TKO (punches)	Gladiator FC: Day 2	June 27, 2004	1	0:42	Seoul, South Korea	
Loss	0–1	Eduard Churakov	Decision (unanimous)	Seikendo: SWA Ultimate Boxing	October 29, 2000	3	3:00	Tokyo, Japan	

== Submission grappling record ==
KO PUNCHES

Result	Opponent	Method	Event	Date	Round	Time	Notes
Loss	(Brazil) Marcos de Souza	Submission (rear-naked choke)	DEEP X 3	2008	1	3:53	

== Kickboxing record ==
Kickboxing record
4 wins (1 KO), 8 losses
Date	Result	Opponent	Event	Location	Method	Round	Time	Record	Notes
January 24, 2015	Loss	(Japan) Kengo Shimizu	RISE 103	Tokyo, Japan	TKO (3 knockdowns)	1	2:25	4–8	-92 kg
November 3, 2009	Loss	(Japan) Mitsugu Noda	Japan-Korea Friendship International Martial Arts Tournament GLADIATOR	Tokyo, Japan	KO (punch)	1	1:05	4–7	
September 13, 2009	Win	(Japan) Tensho Yama	New☆Jungle Square - Mr. Martial Arts Advent!	Tokyo, Japan	DQ (low blow)	4	2:37	4–6	Wins UKF International Heavyweight Championship
October 28, 2007	Loss	(Netherlands) Gilbert Yvel	Shootboxing Battle Sumit Ground Zero Tokyo 2007	Tokyo, Japan	KO (punch)	1	1:48	3–6	
March 6, 2006	Loss	(Japan) Keiichiro Yamamiya	RJPW - Legend Championship & City Area Style Battle	Tokyo, Japan	Decision (unanimous)	3	3:00	3–5	
November 5, 2005	Loss	(United States) Will Riva	AJKF: Rock'n Roll☆U5 FIGHT☆Hill it!	United States	KO (punches)	3	2:00	3–4	
April 9, 2005	Loss	(Netherlands) Melvin Manhoef	Muay Thai Championships League XIV	Amsterdam, Netherlands	TKO (referee stop)	2	2:53	3–3	
March 6, 2005	Win	(Japan) Akihiro Gono	AJKF/Pancrase 2005 Spiral Tour	Tokyo, Japan	KO (punch)	2	1:17	3–2	
December 5, 2004	Loss	(Japan) Ryo Takigawa	AJKF: Fujiwara Festival 2004	Tokyo, Japan	KO (punch)	2	1:30	2–2	
September 23, 2004	Win	(Japan) Kazushi Nishida	AJKF: Danger Zone	Tokyo, Japan	Decision (unanimous)	extra	5:00	2–1	
February 28, 2004	Loss	(Netherlands) Jan Lomulder	RISING SUN	Japan	KO (low kick)	3	5:00	1–1	
December 7, 2003	Win	(Japan) Suzuki 3:26	AJKF: Fujiwara Festival	Tokyo, Japan	Decision (unanimous)	3	5:00	1–0	
Legend: Win Loss Draw/No contest
