= UWA Asia Pacific Heavyweight Championship =

Professional wrestling championship

- The UWA Asia Pacific Heavyweight Championship belt

Details
- Promotion: Strong Style Pro-Wrestling
- Date established: 2018
- Current champion: Shogun Okamoto
- Date won: April 22, 2021
Statistics
- First champion: Rey Ángel
- Most reigns: Shogun Okamoto (2 reigns)
- Longest reign: Shogun Okamoto; 1,762+
- Shortest reign: Rey Ángel (51 days)

The UWA Asia Pacific Heavyweight Championship (Japanese: UWAアジアパシフィックヘビー級王座, Hepburn: UWA Ajia Pashifikku Hebī-kyū Ōza) is a single championship title in the Japanese professional wrestling promotion Strong Style Pro-Wrestling (SSPW), formerly known as Real Japan Pro Wrestling (RJPW). The title was established in 2018 as part of a collaboration between SSPW and the revived Mexican Universal Wrestling Association. As it is a professional wrestling championship, the championship is not won not by actual competition, but by a scripted ending to a match determined by the bookers and match makers. (Note: Hornbaker (2016) p. 550: "Professional wrestling is a sport in which match finishes are predetermined. Thus, win–loss records are not indicative of a wrestler's genuine success based on their legitimate abilities – but on now much, or how little they were pushed by promoters") On occasion the promotion declares a championship vacant, which means there is no champion at that point in time. This can either be due to a storyline, (Note: Duncan & Will (2000) p. 271, Chapter: Texas: NWA American Tag Team Title [World Class, Adkisson] "Championship held up and rematch ordered because of the interference of manager Gary Hart") or real life issues such as a champion suffering an injury being unable to defend the championship, (Note: Duncan & Will (2000) p. 20, Chapter: (United States: 19th Century & widely defended titles – NWA, WWF, AWA, IW, ECW, NWA) NWA/WCW TV Title "Rhodes stripped on 85/10/19 for not defending the belt after having his leg broken by Ric Flair and Ole & Arn Anderson") or leaving the company. (Note: Duncan & Will (2000) p. 201, Chapter: (Memphis, Nashville) Memphis: USWA Tag Team Title "Vacant on 93/01/18 when Spike leaves the USWA.")

As of April 19, 2022, there have been a total of five reigns. The current champion is Shogun Okamoto who is in his second reign.

== History ==
On February 28, 2018, a press conference was held in Tokyo, Japan announcing a Universal Wrestling Association (UWA) revival. As part of the revival, the UWA Asia Pacific Heavyweight Championship was created and Rey Ángel was appointed as the first champion with a title defense scheduled on September 20 against Kouki Iwasaki from Ganbare☆Pro-Wrestling.

== Reigns ==
Key
No.	Overall reign number
Reign	Reign number for the specific champion
Days	Number of days held
Defenses	Number of successful defenses
N/A	Unknown information
(NLT)	Championship change took place "no later than" the date listed
+	Current reign is changing daily

No.	Champion	Championship change			Reign statistics			Notes	Ref.
No.	Champion	Date	Event	Location	Reign	Days	Defenses	Notes	Ref.
1	Rey Ángel	July 31, 2018 (NLT)	N/A	N/A	1	(Note: The exact date the championship was awarded has not been confirmed, putting the title reign at between 51 and 204 days.)	0	Was awarded the title.	
2	Kouki Iwasaki	September 20, 2018	Return to Origin Pro-Wrestling #4: World Mask Man Tournament Semi-Final	Tokyo, Japan	1	364	0		
3	Shogun Okamoto	September 19, 2019	Strong Style Pro-Wrestling Vol. 3	Tokyo, Japan	1	182	0		
4	Hayato Mashita	March 19, 2020	Strong Style Pro-Wrestling Vol. 5	Tokyo, Japan	1	399	2	This was a three-way match also involving Kouki Iwasaki.	
5	Shogun Okamoto	April 22, 2021	Strong Style Pro-Wrestling Vol. 10	Tokyo, Japan	2	1,762+	2		

== Combined reigns ==
†	Indicates the current champion
¤	The exact length of at least one title reign is uncertain, so the shortest possible length is used.

Rank	Wrestler	No. of reigns	No. of defenses	Combined days
1	Shogun Okamoto †	2	2	1,944+
2	Hayato Mashita	1	2	399
3	Kouki Iwasaki	1	0	364
4	Rey Ángel	1	0	51¤
