= Legend Championship =

Professional wrestling championship

Details
- Promotion: Strong Style Pro-Wrestling
- Date established: 2005
- Current champion: Kuroshio Tokyo Japan
- Date won: September 11, 2025

Other names
- Legend Championship (レジェンドチャンピオンシップ, Rejendo Chanpionshippu)
Statistics
- First champion: First Tiger Mask
- Most reigns: Super Tiger II (5)
- Longest reign: Super Tiger (1,015 days)
- Shortest reign: Masakatsu Funaki (77 days)

The Legend Championship (Japanese: レジェンド王座, Hepburn: Rejendo Ōza) is the top singles title in the Japanese professional wrestling promotion Strong Style Pro-Wrestling. The title was established in 2005 and, as the name suggests, is mainly competed for by seasoned veterans of the sport. As it is a professional wrestling championship, the championship is not won not by actual competition, but by a scripted ending to a match determined by the bookers and match makers. (Note: Hornbaker (2016) p. 550: "Professional wrestling is a sport in which match finishes are predetermined. Thus, win–loss records are not indicative of a wrestler's genuine success based on their legitimate abilities – but on how much, or how little they were pushed by promoters") On occasion the promotion declares a championship vacant, which means there is no champion at that point in time. This can either be due to a storyline, (Note: Duncan & Will (2000) p. 271, Chapter: Texas: NWA American Tag Team Title [World Class, Adkisson] "Championship held up and rematch ordered because of the interference of manager Gary Hart") or real life issues such as a champion suffering an injury being unable to defend the championship, (Note: Duncan & Will (2000) p. 20, Chapter: (United States: 19th Century & widely defended titles – NWA, WWF, AWA, IW, ECW, NWA) NWA/WCW TV Title "Rhodes stripped on 85/10/19 for not defending the belt after having his leg broken by Ric Flair and Ole & Arn Anderson") or leaving the company. (Note: Duncan & Will (2000) p. 201, Chapter: (Memphis, Nashville) Memphis: USWA Tag Team Title "Vacant on 93/01/18 when Spike leaves the USWA.")

There have been a total of 21 reigns shared among 13 wrestlers. The current champion is Kuroshio Tokyo Japan who is in his first reign.

== Title history ==
=== Reigns ===
Key
No.	Overall reign number
Reign	Reign number for the specific champion
Days	Number of days held
Defenses	Number of successful defenses
N/A	Unknown information
+	Current reign is changing daily

No.	Champion	Championship change			Reign statistics			Notes	Ref.
No.	Champion	Date	Event	Location	Reign	Days	Defenses	Notes	Ref.
Real Japan Pro Wrestling (RJPW)
1	First Tiger Mask	January 27, 2005	First Tiger Mask Legend Championship & Seiken Shinkage-ryu Urban Bodyguard Close-Quarters Combat Tournaments	Tokyo, Japan	1	(Note: The exact date the championship was vacated has not been confirmed, putting the title reign at between 1 day and 323 days.)	0	Defeated The Great Sasuke in the final of a four-man tournament to win the inaugural title.	
—	Vacated	2005	—	—	—	—	—	Tiger Mask vacated the title due to a neck injury.	
2	Masao Orihara	December 16, 2005	Legend Championship	Tokyo, Japan	1	(Note: The exact date the championship was vacated has not been confirmed, putting the title reign at between 16 days and 380 days.)	2	Defeated Alexander Otsuka to win the vacant title.	
—	Vacated	2006	—	—	—	—	—	Championship vacated due to unknown circumstances	
3	Alexander Otsuka	December 4, 2008	Conclusion	Tokyo, Japan	1	643	4	Defeated The Great Sasuke to win the vacant title.	
4	Mitsuya Nagai	September 8, 2010	Strong Proof	Tokyo, Japan	1	316	2		
5	Super Tiger (II)	July 21, 2011	Space Flying Tiger Drop	Tokyo, Japan	1	239	1		
6	Mitsuya Nagai	March 16, 2012	Daybreak	Tokyo, Japan	2	266	1		
7	Super Tiger (II)	December 7, 2012	Traditional	Tokyo, Japan	2	1,015	4		
8	Masakatsu Funaki	September 18, 2015	First Tiger Mask Golden Legend: Legend of the Gold II	Tokyo, Japan	1	82	0		
9	Daisuke Sekimoto	December 9, 2015	First Tiger Mask Golden Legend: Legend of the Gold III	Tokyo, Japan	1	197	1		
10	Masakatsu Funaki	June 23, 2016	First Tiger Mask Golden Legend: Legend of the Gold V	Tokyo, Japan	2	79	0		
11	Shinjiro Otani	September 10, 2016	Golden Age of the Tiger	Tokyo, Japan	1	292	3		
12	Masakatsu Funaki	June 29, 2017	Legend of the Gold VII	Tokyo, Japan	3	77	0		
13	Super Tiger (II)	September 14, 2017	Legend of the Gold VIII	Tokyo, Japan	3	735	2		
Strong Style Pro-Wrestling (SSPW)
14	Kazuyuki Fujita	September 19, 2019	Strong Style Pro-Wrestling Vol. 3	Tokyo, Japan	1	455	1		
15	Super Tiger (II)	December 17, 2020	Strong Style Pro-Wrestling Vol. 8	Tokyo, Japan	4	616	4		
16	Kengo Mashimo	August 25, 2022	Strong Style Pro-Wrestling Vol. 18	Tokyo, Japan	1	181	2		
17	Hayato Mashita	February 22, 2023	Strong Style Pro-Wrestling Vol. 21	Tokyo, Japan	1	484	3		
18	Kazunari Murakami	June 20, 2024	Strong Style Pro-Wrestling Vol. 29	Tokyo, Japan	1	168	1		
19	Super Tiger (II)	December 5, 2024	Strong Style Pro-Wrestling Vol. 32: Rikidōzan Sensei 100th Birthday	Tokyo, Japan	5	98	0		
20	Masakatsu Funaki	March 13, 2025	Strong Style Pro-Wrestling Vol. 33: The 20th Anniversary Year	Tokyo, Japan	4	182	1		
21	Kuroshio Tokyo Japan	September 11, 2025	Strong Style Pro-Wrestling Vol. 36: The 20th Anniversary	Tokyo, Japan	1	155+	0		

=== Combined reigns ===
†	Indicates the current champion
¤	The exact length of at least one title reign is uncertain, so the shortest possible length is used.

Rank	Wrestler	No. of reigns	No. of defenses	Combined days
1	Super Tiger (II)	5	11	2,703
2	Alexander Otsuka	1	4	643
3	Mitsuya Nagai	2	3	582
4	Hayato Mashita	1	3	484
5	Kazuyuki Fujita	1	1	455
6	Masakatsu Funaki	4	1	420
7	Shinjiro Otani	1	3	292
8	Daisuke Sekimoto	1	1	197
9	Kengo Mashimo	1	2	181
10	Kazunari Murakami	1	1	168
11	Masao Orihara	1	2	16¤
12	Kuroshio Tokyo Japan †	1	0	155+
13	First Tiger Mask	1	0	1¤

== See also ==
- WEW Heavyweight Championship
- KO-D Openweight Championship
