= Alexander Otsuka =

Japanese professional wrestler and mixed martial arts fighter

Alexander Otsuka アレクサンダー大塚
- Born: Takashi Otsuka; July 17, 1971 (age 55); Tokushima, Japan
- Other names: The Diet Butcher
- Height: 1.85 m (6 ft 1 in)
- Weight: 92 kg (203 lb)
- Division: Heavyweight; Light Heavyweight
- Style: MMA; Boxing, Wrestling, Brazilian jiu-jitsu, Muay thai, Shooto
- Fighting out of: Adachi-ku, Tokyo, Japan
- Years active: 1994-present (professional wrestling); 1995–2011 (MMA)

Mixed martial arts record
- Total: 18
- Wins: 5
- By knockout: 1
- By submission: 2
- By decision: 1
- By disqualification: 1
- Losses: 13
- By knockout: 7
- By submission: 2
- By decision: 4

Other information
- Mixed martial arts record from Sherdog

Takashi Otsuka (Japanese: 大塚 崇, Ōtsuka Takashi; born July 17, 1971), known by the ring name Alexander Otsuka, is a Japanese professional wrestler and former mixed martial artist. Having competed for multiple pro wrestling organizations in his career, he is known for his work in the Battlarts promotion, as well as Dradition and the Japanese independent circuit.

Otsuka made the move from a successful professional wrestling career to mixed martial arts competition in 1995. He earned a notable victory over Vale Tudo pioneer Marco Ruas in 1998. Though Otsuka finished his career in 2006 with a 4–13 record, he mostly faced very high-ranked opponents, including all-time greats Renzo Gracie, Ken Shamrock, Igor Vovchanchyn, Quinton Jackson, Wanderlei Silva, and Anderson Silva, all of whom defeated him. Otsuka was famous for his toughness in the ring.

== Professional wrestling career ==
A former amateur wrestler since high school, Otsuka was contacted by Yoshiaki Fujiwara to train in Pro Wrestling Fujiwara Gumi. Takashi debuted in 1994 under the name of Alexander Otsuka, a tribute to Alexander Karelin. He went to compete in the promotion until its closure, time in which he moved to Battlarts.

=== Battlarts (1996–2001, 2009) ===
Otsuka became one of the greatest Battlarts stars, feuding with Daisuke Ikeda and Yuki Ishikawa in violent matches and brawls, and being also part of the Love Warriors tag team along with Mohammed Yone. His career in the promotion was parallel to its very existence, ceasing when Battlarts folded in 1999, and doing a return when it reopened in 2002 with Pro Wrestling Zero-One's support. He also competed as a Battlarts representative in Zero-One, U-STYLE, Universal Fighting-Arts Organization and other promotions.

=== Michinoku Pro Wrestling (2006–2007) ===
In 2006, Otsuka started competing in Michinoku Pro Wrestling under the gimmick of Otoko Sakari (男盛), a bisexual, sex addict wrestler who wore a fundoshi and utilized sexual antics against his opponents. Sakari never took off as a serious contender, as he often lost matches by morodashi (モロダシ, being exposed in public) when his opponent compromised his attire, making the ring crew throw the towel to cover it. Sakari feuded mainly with Kanjyuro Matsuyama, scheduling a 7-matches series to solve their enmity, which Sakari lost by 3-4, being forced to shave his pubic hair. Sakari would later appear also in Dradition Pro Wrestling, getting in a feud with Kikutaro.

== Mixed martial arts career ==
Otsuka had his first contact with mixed martial arts when he was sent as a PWFG representative to the Lumax Cup 1995, a tournament of gi-clad MMA, but he was submitted in less of a minute by Shooto representative Egan Inoue. Afterwards, he had a short stint in Fighting Network Rings, losing to Chris Haseman by doctor stoppage from a cut at the event Extension Fighting 2. He retaliated by defeating Haseman in another Rings event, Battle Genesis Vol.2.

=== PRIDE ===
In 1998, Otsuka debuted in worldwide MMA for PRIDE Fighting Championships in PRIDE 4, the same event in which fellow pro wrestler Nobuhiko Takada had his rematch against Rickson Gracie. Otsuka was pitted against Marco Ruas, a Brazilian luta livre exponent from the Ruas Vale Tudo, while Alexander himself represented his home promotion Battlarts. Going against the pundits' judgement, Otsuka showed his skill and tenacity when he managed to take Ruas down and perform ground and pound through his guard, as well as later defending a fully locked rear naked choke to the end of the round. At the second one, Otsuka took Ruas down again and continued throwing punches, drawing blood from Ruas's face, and finally making the doctors call the fight. It was later revealed that Ruas fought under medication for hepatitis and a knee injury, but nonetheless the Japanese press lauded it as one of the biggest upsets ever, and Otsuka won the Tokyo Sports magazine topic award for his victory.

Alexander returned to the promotion at PRIDE 8, facing this time Renzo Gracie. Otsuka still competed in pro wrestling around the time and came to the fight with a head injury, but he did not back down. During the match, he took Gracie down and even mounted him, but Renzo escaped and hit a series of upkicks which bloodied Otsuka's face. However, Otsuka kept on, escaping from a locked triangle choke and seeking the ground and pound again. The second round would have even more action, with the Japanese wrestler forcing Renzo to the mat and getting out of an armbar which seemed to be decisive. Renzo executed a German suplex-like takedown and tried an arm triangle choke, but Alexander was never inactive and even threatened with a Kimura lock before the match ended, with a unanimous decision for Gracie. Despite the loss, Otsuka was cheered all through the match and solidified himself as a fan favorite, while Gracie himself praised Otsuka for his performance and considered him "a very tough opponent".

Two years later, Otsuka returned to PRIDE to take part in the Grand Prix 2000, and was pitted against feared kickboxer Igor Vovchanchyn. Otsuka, who had worked a wrestling match the same day, was cornered by The Great Sasuke, and showed off further his pro wrestling roots by throwing a dropkick against Vovchanchyn. The Ukrainian landed several hard punches and knocked Otsuka down several times, but Alexander kept himself away from being finished and managed to stun Igor with a right punch, though still losing by unanimous decision. Although he was eliminated from the tournament, the Japanese came to fight the next event as well, taking on Pancrase and Ultimate Fighting Championship exponent Ken Shamrock, who won the fight by knocking Otsuka down and executing ground and pound.

At PRIDE 11, Otsuka got his first victory against American wrestler Mike Bourke, who had taken the fight in short notice, yet in turn outweighed Otsuka by 60ibs. Despite missing another dropkick, Otsuka worked from the bottom and locked both of his opponent's arms in a double armbar, making him submit. The technique was originally being used as a finishing move by Otsuka's fellow Battlarts pro wrestler, Carl Greco.

After losing two fights against Guy Mezger, Otsuka was put against Pride middleweight champion Wanderlei Silva, who had defeated many Japanese names in his way, including Kazushi Sakuraba and Daijiro Matsui. Despite his technical inferiority, Otsuka characteristically built the fight over his toughness and defensive abilities. He survived for two rounds, absorbing punches, knees and soccer kicks in his attempts to get the takedown, which he accomplished, gaining north/south position at the end of the second time, though he couldn't capitalize on it. At the third one, Otsuka was finished by a broken nose due to a knee strike.

At Pride 20, Otsuka fought Sanae Kikuta after the two fighters had trashtalked each other since a long time. The fight was a heated one, with Alexander being cornered by Mexican wrestler Solar, who had been disqualified weeks before by hitting Minoru Suzuki with a low blow in his MMA debut. Similarly, Otsuka threw several low blows to Kikuta and disrespected his opponent through the fight, despite being controlled and receiving a soccer kick by Sanae which caused a protruding hematoma in Otsuka's head. Kikuta seemed to finish the fight with a completely extended armbar, but Otsuka typically got out and led the match to a decision, it going to Kikuta.

After giving up professional wrestling in order to focus in MMA, Otsuka faced Anderson Silva at PRIDE 22. The Japanese gave a performance which was described as shocking, taking down and positionally controlling Silva through the majority of the fight; he only lost due to PRIDE's judgement basing itself less on control than submission attempts, which Silva had got with a rear-naked choke on the first round and a heel hook on the third.

Alexander faced fellow shoot-style wrestler Yoshihisa Yamamoto in a special match in PRIDE. The fight was violent, with the two fighters trading takedowns, punches and knees. After Otsuka took his opponent's back when Yoshihisa attempted a rolling kneebar, the Battlarts wrestler landed a jumping knee drop on his spine, but the move also slammed Otsuka's other knee on the mat, injuring it. Alexander continued dominating, hitting hammerfists to the head and even locking a crucifix, but the injury was too grave to keep on and Yamamoto came back with his own knees, making Otsuka throw the fight.

Otsuka had his last apparition at PRIDE 27, where he went against Murilo Rua, but the fight had to be postponed later in the event when Rua landed an accidental low blow. It was hard enough to actually break Otsuka's protective cup and making him need to be stretchered out. The restarted fight was fast, with Otsuka absorbing knee strikes and attempting heel hooks until Murilo got an arm triangle choke, making him tap out.

== Championships and accomplishments ==
- BattlARTS
  - Young Generation Battle (2000)
  - BattlARTS Tag Battle (1998) - with Muhammad Yone
  - King And Queens Tournament (1999) – with Azumi Hyuga and Hikari Fukuoka
  - King And Queens Tournament (2000) – with Mariko Yoshida and Yumi Fukawa
- Dragongate
  - Open the Owarai Gate Championship (1 time)
- Michinoku Pro Wrestling
  - Akita Across Noshiro Cup (2006)
- Osaka Pro Wrestling
  - Osaka Pro Wrestling Owarai Championship (1 times)
- Real Japan Pro Wrestling
  - Legend Championship (1 time)
- Tokyo Sports
  - Topic Award (1998)

=== Luchas de Apuestas record ===
| Winner (wager) | Loser (wager) | Location | Event | Date | Notes |
|---|---|---|---|---|---|
| Kanjyuro Matsuyama (hair) | Otoko Sakari (hair) | Tokyo, Japan | Michi Pro Ride High | February 24, 2007 | |

== Mixed martial arts record ==
Professional record breakdown
| 18 matches | 5 wins | 13 losses |
| By knockout | 1 | 7 |
| By submission | 2 | 2 |
| By decision | 1 | 4 |
| By disqualification | 1 | 0 |

| Res. | Record | Opponent | Method | Event | Date | Round | Time | Location | Notes |
|---|---|---|---|---|---|---|---|---|---|
| Win | 5–13 | Bob Sapp | DQ (illegal slams) | Accel: Vol. 18: X'mas Seiya Matsuri | December 25, 2011 | 2 | 1:43 | Kobe, Hyogo, Japan | |
| Win | 4–13 | Masada Masada | Submission (triangle choke) | VFX: Vale Tudo Fighters Mexico | May 27, 2006 | 1 | 4:00 | Tlahuac, Mexico | |
| Loss | 3–13 | Murilo Rua | Submission (arm-triangle choke) | PRIDE 27 | February 1, 2004 | 1 | 5:25 | Osaka, Japan | |
| Win | 3–12 | Kenichi Yamamoto | Decision (unanimous) | PRIDE 25 | March 16, 2003 | 3 | 5:00 | Yokohama, Japan | |
| Loss | 2–12 | Yoshihisa Yamamoto | TKO (leg injury) | PRIDE 24 | December 23, 2002 | 2 | 5:00 | Fukuoka, Japan | |
| Loss | 2–11 | Anderson Silva | Decision (unanimous) | PRIDE 22 | September 29, 2002 | 3 | 5:00 | Nagoya, Japan | |
| Loss | 2–10 | Sanae Kikuta | Decision (unanimous) | PRIDE 20 | April 28, 2002 | 3 | 5:00 | Yokohama, Japan | |
| Loss | 2–9 | Wanderlei Silva | TKO (doctor stoppage) | PRIDE 18 | December 23, 2001 | 3 | 2:22 | Fukuoka, Japan | |
| Loss | 2–8 | Quinton Jackson | TKO (doctor stoppage) | BattlArts: BattlArts vs. the World | October 14, 2001 | 2 | 5:00 | Tokyo, Japan | |
| Loss | 2–7 | Guy Mezger | TKO (doctor stoppage) | KOTC 7: Wet and Wild | February 24, 2001 | 2 | 1:57 | San Jacinto, California, United States | |
| Loss | 2–6 | Guy Mezger | TKO (punches) | PRIDE 12: Cold Fury | December 9, 2000 | 1 | 1:52 | Saitama, Japan | |
| Win | 2–5 | Mike Bourke | Submission (double armbar) | PRIDE 11: Battle of the Rising Sun | October 31, 2000 | 1 | 2:37 | Osaka, Japan | |
| Loss | 1–5 | Ken Shamrock | KO (punches) | PRIDE Grand Prix 2000 Finals | May 1, 2000 | 1 | 9:43 | Tokyo, Japan | |
| Loss | 1–4 | Igor Vovchanchyn | Decision (unanimous) | PRIDE Grand Prix 2000 Opening Round | January 30, 2000 | 1 | 15:00 | Tokyo, Japan | |
| Loss | 1–3 | Renzo Gracie | Decision (unanimous) | PRIDE 8 | November 21, 1999 | 2 | 10:00 | Tokyo, Japan | |
| Win | 1–2 | Marco Ruas | TKO (corner stoppage) | PRIDE 4 | October 11, 1998 | 2 | 10:00 | Tokyo, Japan | |
| Loss | 0–2 | Chris Haseman | TKO (doctor stoppage from a cut) | RINGS: Extension Fighting 2 | April 22, 1997 | 1 | 7:03 | Japan | |
| Loss | 0–1 | Egan Inoue | Submission (armbar) | Lumax Cup: Tournament of J '95 | October 13, 1995 | 1 | 0:55 | Japan | |
