= Strong Style Pro-Wrestling =

Japanese professional wrestling

- Strong Style Pro-Wrestling logo used since 2019
- Acronym: SSPW
- Founded: 2005
- Style: Puroresu; Mixed martial arts Shoot style
- Headquarters: Japan
- Founder: Satoru Sayama
- Owner: Satoru Sayama
- Formerly: Real Japan Pro-Wrestling (2005–2019)
- Split from: Shooto
- Predecessor: Seikendo
- Website: www.firsttiger.jp

First Tiger Mask Satoru Sayama Strong Style Pro-Wrestling (Japanese: 初代タイガーマスク 佐山サトル ストロングスタイルプロレス, Hepburn: Shodai Taigā Masuku Sayama Satoru Sutorongu Sutairu Puroresu; also simply known as Strong Style Pro-Wrestling) (SSPW) is a Japanese professional wrestling and martial arts promotion founded in 2005 by Satoru Sayama as Real Japan Pro-Wrestling (リアルジャパンプロレス, Riaru Japan Puroresu) (RJPW), before being renamed in 2019.

The promotion runs shows every two or three months, and features both professional wrestling matches and matches from a variety of martial arts, like mixed martial arts, kickboxing, and Seikendo. SSPW feature wrestlers from other promotions as well as their own talent, and has had working agreements with Toryumon Mexico, Battlarts, and Dradition.

== Roster ==
- Hayato Mashita
- Ikuto Hidaka
- Shodai Tiger Mask
- Super Rider
- Super Tiger II

Notable guests

- Akebono
- Akifumi Saito
- Alexander Otsuka
- Atsushi Onita
- Bear Fukuda
- Daisuke Sekimoto
- Gran Hamada
- Great Sasuke
- Great Tiger
- Hikaru Sato
- Kendo Nagasaki
- Kota Ibushi
- Kozo Urita
- Masao Orihara
- Masakatsu Funaki
- Minoru Suzuki
- Mitsuya Nagai
- Riki Choshu
- Tatsuhito Takaiwa
- Tatsumi Fujinami
- Último Dragón
- Wakashoyo Shunichi

== Championships ==
=== Active ===
As of February 14, 2026, Strong Style Pro-Wrestling has four active championships.

Championship	Current champion(s)	Reign	Date won	Days held	Location	Notes	Ref.
Legend Championship	Kuroshio Tokyo Japan	1	September 11, 2025	156+	Tokyo, Japan	Defeated Masakatsu Funaki at Strong Style Pro-Wrestling Vol. 36: The 20th Anniversary.	
UWA Asia Pacific Heavyweight Championship	Shogun Okamoto	2	April 22, 2021	1,759+	Tokyo, Japan	Defeated Hayato Mashita at Strong Style Pro-Wrestling Vol. 10.	
SSPW World Tag Team Championship	Super Tiger and Masashi Takeda	1	December 4, 2025	72+	Tokyo, Japan	Defeated Kazunari Murakami and Yoshiki "Hitokui" Takahashi at Strong Style Pro-Wrestling Vol. 37: The 20th Anniversary to become the inaugural champions.	
SSPW Women's Tag Team Championship	Jaguar Yokota and Megumi Yabushita	1	December 7, 2023	800+	Tokyo, Japan	Defeated Tiger Queen and Haruka Umesaki in the final of a tournament at Strong Style Pro-Wrestling Vol. 26: 60th Anniversary Memorial Show for Rikidōzan Sensei to become the inaugural champions.	

=== Inactive ===
Championship	Last champion(s)	Reign	Date won	Location	Notes	Ref.
RJPW Tag Team Championship	Black Shadow and Tiger Shark	1	December 9, 2010	Tokyo, Japan	Defeated Black Tiger and Alexander Otsuka at Extreme to become the inaugural champions.	

=== SSPW World Tag Team Championship ===
SSPW World Tag Team Championship

Details
- Promotion: Strong Style Pro-Wrestling
- Current champions: Super Tiger and Masashi Takeda
- Date won: December 4, 2025
Statistics
- First champions: Super Tiger and Masashi Takeda

The SSPW World Tag Team Championship (Japanese: SSPW認定世界タッグ王座, Hepburn: SSPW-nintei Sekai Taggu Ōza) is a professional wrestling championship created and promoted by Strong Style Pro-Wrestling. The current and inaugural champions are Super Tiger and Masashi Takeda.

Key
No.	Overall reign number
Reign	Reign number for the specific team—reign numbers for the individuals are in parentheses, if different
Days	Number of days held
Defenses	Number of successful defenses
+	Current reign is changing daily

No.	Champion	Championship change			Reign statistics			Notes	Ref.
No.	Champion	Date	Event	Location	Reign	Days	Defenses	Notes	Ref.
1	Super Tiger and Masashi Takeda	December 4, 2025	Strong Style Pro-Wrestling Vol. 37: The 20th Anniversary	Tokyo, Japan	1	72+	0	Defeated Kazunari Murakami and Yoshiki "Hitokui" Takahashi to become the first champions.	

=== SSPW Women's Tag Team Championship ===
SSPW Women's Tag Team Championship

Details
- Promotion: Strong Style Pro-Wrestling
- Current champions: Jaguar Yokota and Megumi Yabushita
- Date won: December 7, 2023
Statistics
- First champions: Jaguar Yokota and Megumi Yabushita

The SSPW Women's Tag Team Championship (Japanese: SSPW認定女子タッグ王座, Hepburn: SSPW-nintei Joshi Taggu Ōza) is a professional wrestling championship created and promoted by Strong Style Pro-Wrestling. The current and inaugural champions are Jaguar Yokota and Megumi Yabushita.

Key
No.	Overall reign number
Reign	Reign number for the specific team—reign numbers for the individuals are in parentheses, if different
Days	Number of days held
Defenses	Number of successful defenses
+	Current reign is changing daily

No.	Champion	Championship change			Reign statistics			Notes	Ref.
No.	Champion	Date	Event	Location	Reign	Days	Defenses	Notes	Ref.
1	Jaguar Yokota and Megumi Yabushita	December 7, 2023	Strong Style Pro-Wrestling Vol. 26: 60th Anniversary Memorial Show for Rikidōzan Sensei	Tokyo, Japan	1	800+	4	Defeated Tiger Queen and Haruka Umesaki in the final of a tournament to become the first champions.	

== See also ==
- Professional wrestling in Japan
- List of professional wrestling promotions in Japan
