= Satoru Sayama =

Japanese professional wrestler

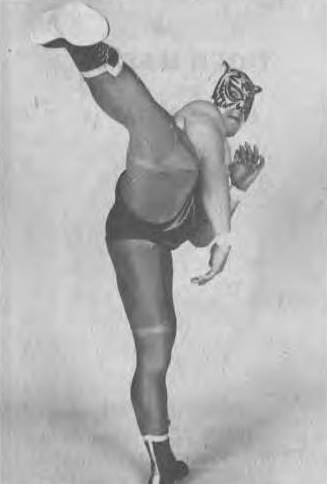
- Tiger Mask, c. 1983

Personal information
- Born: November 27, 1957 (age 68) Shimonoseki, Yamaguchi, Japan

Professional wrestling career
- Ring name(s): First Tiger Mask; Mask of Tiger; Sammy Lee; Satoshi Sayama; Satoru Sayama; Super Tiger; Tiger; Tiger King; Tiger Mask; Tigre Enmascarado
- Billed height: 5 ft 8 in (173 cm)
- Billed weight: 198 lb (90 kg)
- Trained by: Antonio Inoki; Diablo Velasco; Karl Gotch; Kotetsu Yamamoto; Yoshiaki Fujiwara
- Debut: May 28, 1976
- Retired: December 7, 2016

Satoru Sayama (佐山 聡, Sayama Satoru; born November 27, 1957), best known as the original Tiger Mask, is a Japanese writer, retired professional wrestler, martial artist, mixed martial arts (MMA) and wrestling promoter, and trainer.

He is the founder of Shooto, a pre-Ultimate Fighting Championship MMA promotion, and is widely considered to be one of the most influential masked Japanese wrestlers of all time (alongside his contemporaries Jushin Thunder Liger and Último Dragón). The only man to hold the WWF Junior Heavyweight Championship and the NWA World Junior Heavyweight Championship simultaneously, Sayama became widely known in the wrestling world for his all-round prowess of high-flying, technical abilities, and martial combat skills (as he was a practitioner of judo and freestyle wrestling in his youth).

Primarily trained under New Japan Pro-Wrestling (NJPW) founder Antonio Inoki and his mentor Karl Gotch, Sayama made his professional wrestling debut in 1976 at 18 years old. He was sent on an excursion to Europe for World of Sport Wrestling and Mexico for Empresa Mexicana de la Lucha Libre, where he not only found his ground as a technical wrestler, but also found his niche in Lucha libre. Sayama became Tiger Mask in 1981, brought from Ikki Kajiwara's 1968 manga series of the same name and the popular anime of the decade. He became involved in highly publicized feuds with Black Tiger (portrayed by Mark Rocco), Dynamite Kid, and Yoshiaki Fujiwara, who was one of Sayama's own trainers. He left NJPW at the height of his popularity in 1983 due to political disenfranchisement, and later became a founding member of the UWF brand in Japan. He then became dissatisfied with wrestling as a whole, leading him to write Kay Fabe (1985), which detailed the kayfabe and secrets of puroresu at the time.

After declaring retirement from professional wrestling in 1985 after the collapse of UWF, he founded Shooto, one of the first MMA organizations in the world. Sayama also started mixed martial arts training and developed his own Shooto syllabus for learning what could be considered the first put together MMA training of its kind, with a focus on striking from arts like boxing, muay thai, and karate, and grappling from wrestling, judo, and sambo. The curriculum would help produce the first well-rounded fighters of MMA several years before the first UFC event. While on Shooto, Sayama promoted the Vale Tudo Japan events, more rules free events inspired by Brazilian Vale Tudo and early UFC, helping to popularize MMA in Japan. He retired from his post in Shooto in 1996, and returned to professional wrestling soon after.

In 2005, Sayama founded his own promotion, Real Japan Pro-Wrestling (RJPW), which later became Strong Style Pro-Wrestling. Sayama likened the promotion to include wrestlers from the past, as well as martial artists, Sayama's students, and modern stars from the likes of Battlarts, Big Japan Pro Wrestling (BJPW), and more. Although he hasn't officially declared retirement, Sayama last wrestled on December 7, 2016. It was announced in 2020 that he had several health problems, which linked him to Parkinson's disease and immobility.

== Professional wrestling and martial arts career ==
Sayama grew up idolizing Antonio Inoki, which drove him to take up judo and amateur wrestling while in middle school. After winning a wrestling tournament, he dropped out of high school to join Inoki's promotion New Japan Pro-Wrestling.

=== Early career; New Japan Pro-Wrestling and excursion (1976–1981) ===
After joining New-Japan Pro wrestling, Sayama trained under Kotetsu Yamamoto and Karl Gotch, who were famous for their harsh training regime and their emphasis in real fighting. They believed wrestlers had to be actually trained to fight before learning to work the predetermined style of professional wrestling. While sparring against taller opponents, Sayama realized he would struggle to grapple in a fight with strikes due to his short weight and reach, so he also joined a kickboxing dojo to compensate for it. Sayama routinely faced the fighters and martial artists who came to perform dojoyaburi in the NJPW dojo, defeating them all. According to Yamamoto, "Sayama was the only, aside from Inoki, who was skilled in breaking someone's arm with a smile in his face."

He debuted in the ring on May 28, 1976 against Shoji Kai (Kanji Kitazawa), a jobber known to have been the debut opponent for future stars (Rusher Kimura, Masa Saito, Osamu Kido, Tatsumi Fujinami, and Mitsuo Momota had debuted against him before). He continued his martial training, especially influenced by the Muhammad Ali vs. Antonio Inoki shoot fight. He developed the philosophy that fights started with striking, transitioned to wrestling and throwing and then ended in submission holds on the ground. The following year, inspired by Bruce Lee's film Enter the Dragon, Sayama created the first MMA gloves in order to be able to both strike and grapple while sparring. He presented them to Inoki, who used them during his match with boxer Chuck Wepner in October.

Sayama also proposed Inoki to create a NJPW branch showcasing real fighting, as if professional wrestling as fought for real (an act called "cement"). Inoki later showed Sayama a possible ruleset, which had been originally proposed by kickboxing champion Benny Urquidez, and promised he would make the branch reality and place Sayama at its front.

His martial experience earned him to represent NJPW in a kickboxing match in the combat sport event Kakutōgi Daisensō, on November 14, 1977. To better prepare himself, he trained in Kenji Kurosaki's Mejiro Gym and lost 4,5 kg. However, his opponent in the event would be experienced American karateka Marc Costello, who was heavily favored for fighting in his usual rules. Sayama realized that he could not win the match, so he treated the match as an experiment and decided to try to grapple through Costello's strikes, even although it would be illegal. As predicted, he was dominated with strikes and defeated by decision, but he was partially successful in his goal, dropping Costello with illegal suplexes and takedowns against the referee's protests. He was criticized by this after the match, but Inoki gave him his approval. The bout drove him to train even harder in real fighting.

Despite the promise to make him a real fighter, Sayama was ordered the learn the theatrical lucha libre style of wrestling in 1978, landing in Mexico. Sayama was disappointed, but nonetheless obligued. It was in Mexico where he started to grow in prominence, winning the NWA World Middleweight Championship in EMLL. In 1980, he was sent to England where wrestling under the gimmick of Sammy Lee, Bruce Lee's fictional cousin. He teamed often with his storyline younger brother Quick-Kick Lee, played by fellow New Japan wrestler Akira Maeda. He took on opponents such as Mark Rocco and Mick McManus as well as teaming with Big Daddy. He was successful enough that initially resisted to being recalled to Japan to play a new character, but relented upon being told it would be a one-night gimmick.

A case of legal trouble related to taxes impeded Sayama to leave England, requiring NJPW executive Hisashi Shinma to contact then Prime Minister of Japan Takeo Fukuda to solve it through the Japanese embassy.

=== Return to NJPW (1981–1983) ===
==== Becoming Tiger Mask ====
In 1981, NJPW was looking for a way to attract young fans to its wrestling. During the height of popular anime Tiger Mask II, its creator Ikki Kajiwara proposed New Japan to create a wrestling character called Tiger Mask for the fans, with Sayama being chosen by Inoki to play the role. On the evening of Thursday, April 23, 1981, Satoru Sayama made his way to the ring in the Kuramae Kokugikan as Tiger Mask to face renowned cruiserweight Dynamite Kid. Initially, many traditional Japanese fans scoffed at the thought of the popular comic book wrestling hero being pushed as a legitimate wrestling star, but he shocked the crowd in the arena by unveiling a wrestling style never seen before and pinning Kid with a German suplex.

As a result, the character was made permanent and was regarded as the premier star in New Japan's junior heavyweight ranks. Sayama stood out for his charisma, ability, and his mix of Japanese wrestling and martial arts with Mexican lucha libre, nicknamed "fourth dimension pro wrestling" (4次元プロレス). Whenever he was in the cards, NJPW sold out and reached 25% share levels in its TV show. Moreover, that match would be the first of many classic battles between Sayama and Dynamite Kid.

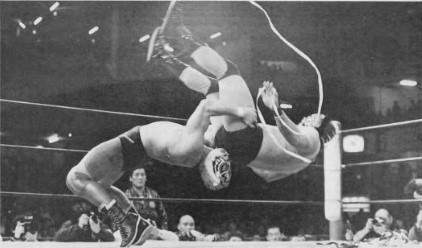
Tiger Mask applies a German suplex to Black Tiger, c. 1982

On May 6, 1982, Tiger Mask was forced to vacate the WWF Junior Heavyweight Championship after injuring his right knee. Tiger Mask would go on to win the NWA World Junior Heavyweight less than 3 weeks later on May 25, 1982. The next day, Tiger Mask defeated old UK rival Mark Rocco, wrestling in the guise of Black Tiger, in a match for the WWF Junior Heavyweight title. This victory was met with controversy, as some board members on the NWA declared the title vacant, as they felt that the NWA World Junior Heavyweight Championship was the premier title for the division. However, during an annual meeting between the NWA and New Japan Pro-Wrestling, it was declared that Tiger Mask was still recognized as the official champion, which made him the only man to simultaneously hold the NWA World Junior Heavyweight Championship and the WWF Junior Heavyweight Championship.

Sayama had mixed feelings about his stardom, feeling NJPW were losing interest in martial arts. This was not only due to Tiger Mask's success, but also because Inoki, increasingly aging and with his health affected by diabetes, could not keep the pace in his traditional matches against martial artists. Sayama tried to compensate by wrestling with the maximum realism, keeping the acrobatics but refraining from using moves that would have been implausible in a real fight. Around this time, Sayama trained in sambo under Victor Koga and kickboxing under Toshio Fujiwara.

==== Departure from NJPW ====
During a tag team match on April 3, 1983 he was injured by Dynamite Kid; two days later, he was forced to vacate the NWA World Junior Heavyweight title after it became clear that he would need time off to recuperate. However, once the determined Tiger Mask recovered, he regained his NWA World Junior Heavyweight Championship by defeating Kuniaki Kobayashi on June 2, 1983, making him a simultaneous NWA/WWF Jr. champion for the second time.

By 1983, however, Sayama started feeling dissatisfied as he hated the politics behind-the-scenes. Executives found out Inoki had embezzled money from the company for his private business in Brazil with the help of Hisashi Shinma and Seiji Sakaguchi. Sayama was required to support to remove them from the company, but feeling in debt with Inoki and citing intrusions by the company in his personal life, he opted to announce his retirement from active competition on August 12, 1983. His last match occurred on August 4, facing Isamu Teranishi. It was a shock to the wrestling world, as Tiger Mask was going to retire while he was at the top of his game and as the holder of two Junior Heavyweight Championships. Both titles were declared vacant.

=== World Wrestling Federation tours (1982) ===
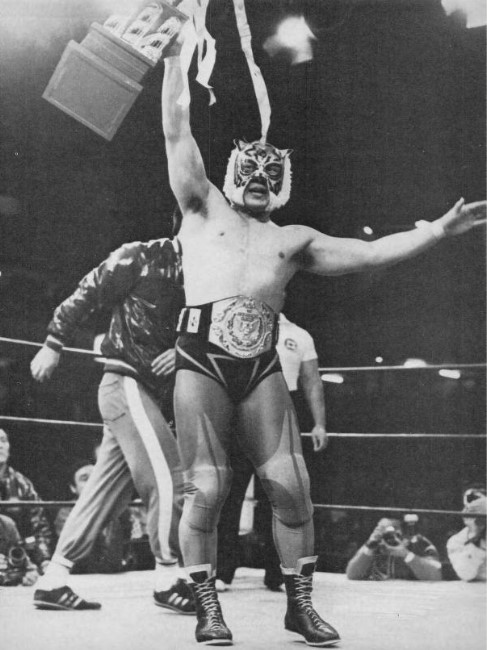
Tiger Mask wins the WWF Junior Heavyweight Championship, c. 1982

In late 1982, while still a member of the NJPW roster, Sayama made at least two tours of the United States as part of the NJPW-WWF working relationship. He appeared primarily in the World Wrestling Federation, at the time a regional promotion in the northeast region of the country.

Sayama defended the WWF Junior Heavyweight Championship by defeating Dynamite Kid at Madison Square Garden in New York City on August 30, and Eddie Gilbert at the Spectrum in Philadelphia on November 25. During his time as Tiger Mask, Sayama had faced mainly English and Mexican opponents, with styles complementary to his own. As a result, the match with Gilbert would be regarded as one of his higher-profile matches against an American-style opponent.

Sayama also made appearances at WWF television tapings during these tours, in which he had televised matches against José Estrada and Mr. Saito.

Joe McHugh, the Pennsylvania Athletic Commission-appointed ring announcer for WWF events in the state and nearing 80 years of age, mistakenly introduced Sayama during one of his appearances as "Timer Mask."

=== Universal Wrestling Federation (1984–1985) ===
Sayama was inactive from the ring for nearly a year, which he invested in dedicating himself to martial arts with Inoki's blessing. He founded the Tiger Gym and created the combat sport known as Shooting, later known as Shooto, which would reflect all of his martial philosophy. Shoot is considered to be the first mixed martial arts promotion.

Sayama resurfaced in the Japanese Universal Wrestling Federation in 1984, joining along with his protege Kazuo Yamazaki. By then, All Japan Pro Wrestling had purchased the Tiger Mask name and gimmick and given it to Mitsuharu Misawa. As a result, Sayama initially made appearances for UWF as The Tiger (which was the same colors as Tiger Mask), then alternated between using his real name and the gimmick of Super Tiger (colored silver and purple). He initially supported the UWF concept and had several memorable matches against Akira Maeda and Yoshiaki Fujiwara. Sayama would soon disagree with Maeda over style ideology, which led to a shoot during a match between Sayama and Maeda in 1985, in which Maeda delivered some controversial kicks to Sayama's lower abdomen. Sayama claimed that he was kicked in the groin, resulting in Maeda being disqualified. Shortly after this, Sayama left UWF, amid recriminations from other UWF wrestlers who disliked him for his selfish leadership. With no key opponents for Maeda, the UWF collapsed and Maeda and the rest of the roster headed back to NJPW.

=== Retirement and Shooto (1985–1996) ===
Sayama then left professional wrestling altogether and focused on managing Shooto and the Tiger Gym. He taught the art of shooting to fighters like Yorinaga Nakamura, Yuki Nakai and Rumina Sato, among others. During this time Sayama hosted the Vale Tudo Japan event, leading to the introduction of Brazilian jiu-jitsu in Japan, which drove him to change the rules of Shooto to adapt them to the vale tudo. In 1996 he left Shooto due to disagreements with the board of directors, and was succeeded by Taro Wakayabayshi.

On May 1, 1994, Sayama made a return and fought in a match against Jushin Thunder Liger that ended in a no contest at a New Japan Pro Wrestling.

=== Return to wrestling and aftermath (1995–2016, 2026) ===
In 1995, Sayama was offered to return to puroresu for a match against old mentor Antonio Inoki. As there was already a Tiger Mask on the scene (his disciple, Tiger Mask IV, who debuted with the mask), Sayama used the name and gimmick Tiger King, using a gold-colored outfit. Inoki ended up winning the match.

In subsequent years, he (using the Original [Shodai] Tiger Mask identity), competing sporadically in various independent promotions, often in legends matches and teams with his younger disciple. In 1998, he was invited by Inoki to be a part of the board of his new venture, Universal Fighting-Arts Organization. He did, but left a year later to form Seikendo.

In 1999, attempting to return to the world of martial arts and to create something similar to Shooto, he created a martial art named Seikendo. It was a hybrid martial art similar to Shooto and MMA, but more akin to a traditional martial art—with focus on etiquette and ceremonials based on traditional Japanese imagery and ideals and spiritual and mental development—and focused on "street" self-defense rather than sporting events: Seikendokas would wear keikogis to simulate clothing, had rules that based on the principle it had a concrete floor, with groundfighting that focused on ground-and-pound, with no submissions allowed, and fighting was in an octagonal ring without ropes. Sayama also created a professional promotion by the same name to promote his martial art (as he had done to Shooto), which ran for three years and had five events before closing down in 2003.

In 2005, he founded a new promotion called Real Japan Pro-Wrestling and started to promote his old Super Tiger gimmick. However, with a career spanning over 30 years in addition to being actively involved in martial arts aside from wrestling, have taken its toll, with Sayama being fodder in singles matches for current stars aiming to become legends, such as Shinjiro Otani and Triple Crown Heavyweight Champion Minoru Suzuki (the title was not on the line in their match).

He has also appeared in Tatsumi Fujinami's Dradition promotion, as well as Antonio Inoki's Inoki Genome Federation. Sayama is much heavier than he was in his younger days, and as a result, his style has changed; he focuses more on mat-based wrestling, though he still uses his trademark martial arts kicks.

Still training young wrestlers, Sayama endorsed a second Super Tiger, played by seikendoka and mixed martial artist Yuji Sakuragi. In 2010, Sayama picked Ikuhisa Minowa as the fifth Tiger Mask, but has not wrestled under the mask since.

At the March 20, 2015, Real Japan event, Sayama was defeated by All Japan wrestler Akebono following a splash from the former yokozuna. Afterwards, Sayama began experiencing chest pains, which forced him to pull out of subsequent matches. After multiple tests, it was determined that Sayama needed to undergo emergency heart surgery, which took place on May 22. Following the surgery, Sayama began suffering from angina, which forced him to pull out of Real Japan's 10th anniversary event on June 11. On June 5, Sayama held a press conference, stating that he was not thinking about retiring from professional wrestling despite his life being in danger prior to the catheter surgery. Sayama returned to the ring on June 23, 2016, battling Minowaman to a draw, but has not been back since then.

On July 7, 2026, Sayama made a rare appearance as part of the fourth Tiger Mask and protoge, Yoshihiro Yamazaki's retirement ceremony.

== Other media ==
In 1995, Sayama starred along Itsumi Osawa in the Toshihiro Sato movie Roppongi Soldier as Ken Washizu, a former kickboxer turned private detective. His partner Yoshiaki Fujiwara appears as well, portraying a fellow fighter.

He also had an appearance in the 2004 movie Shinsetsu Tiger Mask, a biographical film about Sayama's life in which he is played by Masakatsu Funaki. Sayama himself plays Tiger Mask's trainer.

== Works ==
- (1984) Super Tiger Shooting: The road to the strongest combat sports (スーパー・タイガーシューティング―格闘技最強への道, Sūpā taigāshūtingu ― kakutōgi saikyō e no michi)
- (1986) Introduction to Satoru Sayama's shooting (佐山聡のシューティング入門, Sayamasatoru no shūtingu nyūmon) ISBN 9784062027113
- (1989) Satoru Sayama's advanced shooting: The road to pankration (佐山聡のシューティング上級編―パンクラチオンへの道, Sayamasatoru no shūtingu jōkyū-hen ― pankurachion e no michi) ISBN 9784062032391
- (1989) Kayfabe (ケーフェイ, Kēfei) ISBN 9784795220720
- (1998) This is sambo! (これがサンボだ!, Kore ga sanbo da!) ISBN 9784583025643 - with Victor Koga
- (1999) The Kakutoka: The true face of the warrior aiming to be the best (ザ・格闘家―最強を目指した戦士たちの素顔, Za kakutō-ka ― saikyō o mezashita senshi-tachi no sugao) ISBN 9784334972325
- (2000) Satoru Sayama's seikendo (佐山聡の掣圏道, Sayamasatoru no seikendō) ISBN 9784893741448
- (2001) Brave on heart, with a true hero: If you break, you lose (ブレイヴ・オン・ハート 真の勇者とは―キレたら負ける, Bureivu on hāto shin no yūsha to wa ― Kiretara makeru) ISBN 9784828409092
- (2002) Self-defense: The strongest real technique (護身―最強のリアルテクニック, Goshin ― saikyō no riarutekunikku) ISBN 978-4537201024
- (2010) Sayama's principles for neworn modern martial arts (佐山原理 新生武道真陰, Sayama genri Shinsei budō shin'in) ISBN 9784809408502
- (2014) The real immovable mind: Mental training (「リアル不動心」メンタルトレーニング, `Riaru fudō kokoro' mentarutorēningu) ISBN 9784062728799

== Championships and accomplishments ==
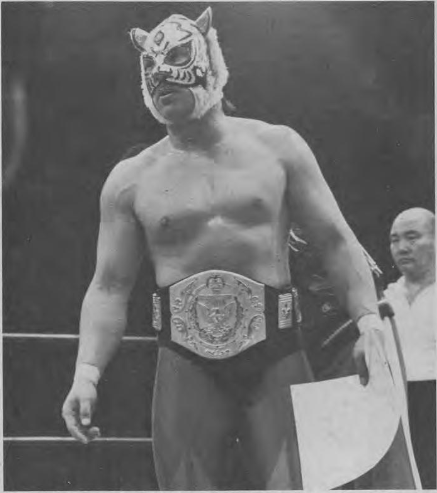
Tiger Mask as the WWF Junior Heavyweight Champion, 1982

- Empresa Mexicana de la Lucha Libre

- NWA World Middleweight Championship (1 time)
- WWF Junior Heavyweight Championship (1 time)

- New Japan Pro-Wrestling

- NWA World Junior Heavyweight Championship (2 times)
- WWF Junior Heavyweight Championship (2 times)

- International Professional Wrestling Hall of Fame
  - Class of 2021
- Pro Wrestling Illustrated

- PWI ranked him #274 of the top 500 singles wrestlers of the PWI 500 in 2006
- PWI ranked him #37 of the top 500 singles wrestlers of the PWI Years in 2003

- Real Japan Pro Wrestling

- Legend Championship (1 time)

- Tokyo Pro Wrestling

- TWA Tag Team Championship (1 time) - with Yoji Anjo

- Tokyo Sports

- MVP Award (1982)
- Popularity Award (1981)
- Technique Award (1982, 1984)

- Universal Wrestling Federation

- UWF Tournament winner (1984)
- Kakuto Nettai Road "A" League Tournament (1985)

- Wrestling Observer Newsletter

- Best Flying Wrestler (1982, 1983)
- Most Impressive Wrestler (1982)
- Best Technical Wrestler (1982, 1983)
- Match of the Year (1982) vs. Dynamite Kid, August 5, Tokyo, Japan
- Wrestling Observer Newsletter Hall of Fame (Class of 1996)

=== Luchas de Apuestas record ===
Winner (wager)	Loser (wager)	Location	Event	Date	Notes
Satoru Sayama (hair)	Alfonso Dantés (hair)	México City	Live event	June 15, 1979	
Tiger Mask (mask)	Masked Hurricane (mask)	Tokyo, Japan	Live event	October 8, 1981	

== Kickboxing record ==
Kickboxing record
0 wins, 1 loss
Date	Result	Opponent	Event	Location	Method	Round	Time	Record
November 14, 1977	Loss	Marc Costello	Kakutōgi Daisensō	Tokyo, Japan	Decision (unanimous)	6	2:00	0-1
Legend: Win Loss Draw/No contest

== Mixed martial arts exhibition record ==
Exhibition record breakdown		
3 matches	1 win	0 losses
By knockout	1	0
Draws	2	

Res.	Record	Opponent	Method	Event	Date	Round	Time	Location	Notes
Draw	1–0–2	Yoshinori Nishi	Technical Draw	Lumax Cup - Tournament of J'95	October 13, 1995	1	5:30	Tokyo, Japan	
Win	1–0–1	Kuniaki Kobayashi	KO (high kick)	Shooto: Vale Tudo Perception	September 26, 1995	1	6:05	Tokyo, Japan	
Draw	0–0–1	Yuji Ito	Technical Draw	VTJ 1994 - Vale Tudo Japan 1994	July 29, 1994	2	3:00	Tokyo, Japan	

== Filmography ==
Year	Title	Role
1995	Roppongi Soldier	Ken Washizu
2004	Shinsetsu Tiger Mask	Tiger Mask's trainer
2006	Waru	
2006	Waru: kanketsu-hen	

== See also ==
- Universal Wrestling Federation (Japan)
