= Professional wrestling at the Tokyo Dome =

List of professional wrestling shows

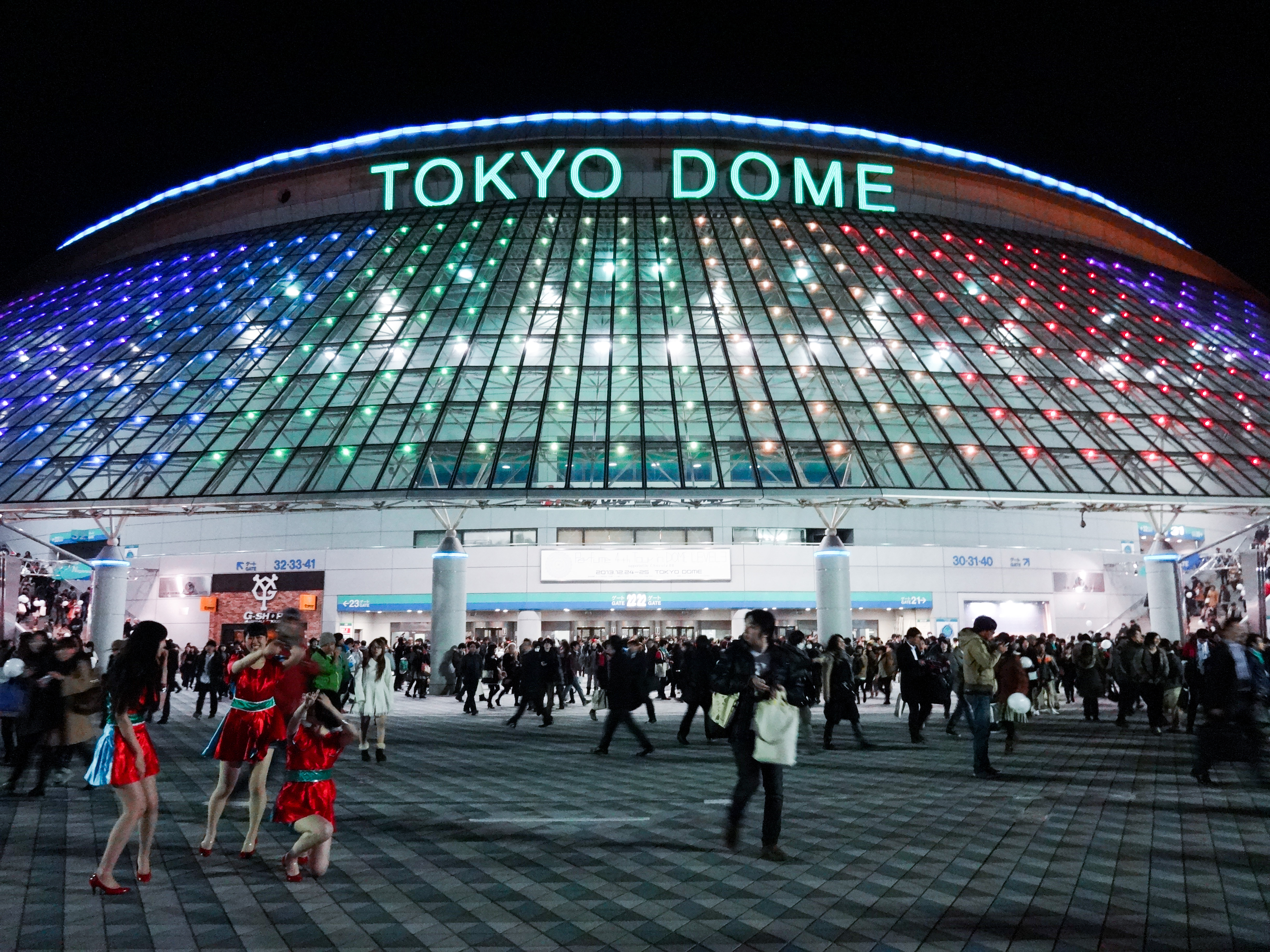
The Tokyo Dome at night

This is a list chronicling the history of professional wrestling at the Tokyo Dome. The Tokyo Dome stadium in Bunkyo, Tokyo, Japan has hosted a number of professional wrestling supercard events over the years. These events often air on pay-per-view (PPV) or are recorded for a future television broadcast. New Japan Pro-Wrestling (NJPW) is the promotion which has held the most shows at the Tokyo Dome, including the very first professional wrestling event at the venue – Battle Satellite in Tokyo Dome on April 24, 1989. NJPW also holds their annual January 4 Tokyo Dome Show event, currently promoted under the Wrestle Kingdom name – Wrestle Kingdom is considered NJPW's biggest show of the year, their version of WrestleMania. The first January 4 show, Super Warriors in Tokyo Dome, took place in 1992 and has been held each year since then. As of night two of Wrestle Kingdom 15, NJPW has held a total of 55 shows in the Tokyo Dome. (Note: Sources are found in the table.)

The Tokyo Dome was the site of the only NJPW, All Japan Pro Wrestling (AJPW), and World Wrestling Federation (WWF, now WWE) co-promoted show, the Wrestling Summit held on April 13, 1990. WWE participated in two additional Tokyo Dome events, co-promoting WrestleFest and SuperWrestle with Super World of Sports (SWS) in 1991. Including the Wrestling Summit, AJPW has been involved in six Dome shows, currently holding the record for the second highest amount of Tokyo Dome wrestling events. Pro Wrestling Noah, All Japan Women's Pro-Wrestling (AJW), DDT Pro-Wrestling (DDT), Jd', the Universal Wrestling Federation (UWF) and its successor the Union of Wrestling Forces International (UWFi), Pro Wrestling Fujiwara Gumi (PWFG), Big Japan Pro Wrestling (BJW), World Championship Wrestling (WCW), the Universal Fighting-Arts Organization (UFO), Total Nonstop Action Wrestling (TNA), Global Force Wrestling (GFW), All Elite Wrestling (AEW), Ring of Honor (ROH), Consejo Mundial de Lucha Libre (CMLL), and World Wonder Ring Stardom have all also held events at the Tokyo Dome. Many Tokyo Dome events are collaborative efforts that feature wrestlers from multiple promotions; Weekly Pro Wrestling magazine's Bridge of Dreams event featured the participation of thirteen professional wrestling and mixed martial arts promotions and AJW's Big Egg Wrestling Universe event featured the participation of every major joshi promotion in Japan.

NJPW wrestler Hiroshi Tanahashi has worked eleven main event matches at the Tokyo Dome, the most of any wrestler. This is followed by Shinya Hashimoto, Keiji Mutoh, Shinsuke Nakamura, and Kazuchika Okada (tied at eight).

== Dates and events ==
Date	Promotion(s)	Show	Main Event	Notes	Ref(s).
April 24, 1989	NJPW	Battle Satellite in Tokyo Dome	Shota Chochishvili vs. Antonio Inoki (c) for the WWF World Martial Arts Heavyweight Championship		
November 29, 1989	UWF	U-Cosmos	Akira Maeda vs. Willie Wilhelm		
February 10, 1990	NJPW	Super Fight	Antonio Inoki and Seiji Sakaguchi vs. Shinya Hashimoto and Masahiro Chono; Lou Thesz served as the guest referee		
April 13, 1990	AJPW; NJPW; WWF	Wrestling Summit	Hulk Hogan vs. Stan Hansen		
March 21, 1991	NJPW; WCW	Starrcade in Tokyo Dome	Tatsumi Fujinami (c – IWGP) vs. Ric Flair (c – NWA) for the NWA World Heavyweight Championship and the IWGP Heavyweight Championship	Aired in the United States as WCW/New Japan Supershow I in April 1991	
March 30, 1991	SWS; WWF	Wrestlefest	The Legion of Doom (Animal and Hawk) vs. Hulk Hogan and Genichiro Tenryu		
December 12, 1991	SWS; WWF	SuperWrestle	Hulk Hogan vs. Genichiro Tenryu		
January 4, 1992	NJPW; WCW	Super Warriors in Tokyo Dome	Riki Choshu (c – Greatest 18) vs. Tatsumi Fujinami (c – IWGP) for the IWGP Heavyweight Championship and the Greatest 18 Club Championship	Aired in the United States as WCW/New Japan Supershow II in March 1992	
October 4, 1992	PWFG	Stack of Arms	Masakatsu Funaki vs. Maurice Smith		
January 4, 1993	NJPW; WCW	Fantastic Story in Tokyo Dome	Genichiro Tenryu vs. Riki Choshu	Aired in the United States as WCW/New Japan Supershow III in March 1993	
January 4, 1994	NJPW	Battlefield	Genichiro Tenryu vs. Antonio Inoki		
November 20, 1994	AJW	Big Egg Wrestling Universe	Akira Hokuto vs. Aja Kong		
January 4, 1995	NJPW	Battle 7	Shinya Hashimoto (c) vs. Kensuke Sasaki for the IWGP Heavyweight Championship		
April 2, 1995	Weekly Pro-Wrestling magazine	Bridge of Dreams	Shinya Hashimoto vs. Masahiro Chono		
October 9, 1995	NJPW; UWFi	NJPW vs. UWFi	Keiji Mutoh (c) vs. Nobuhiko Takada for the IWGP Heavyweight Championship		
January 4, 1996	NJPW; UWFi	Wrestling World 1996	Nobuhiko Takada vs. Keiji Mutoh (c) for the IWGP Heavyweight Championship		
April 29, 1996	NJPW	Battle Formation 1996	Shinya Hashimoto vs. Nobuhiko Takada (c) for the IWGP Heavyweight Championship		
December 26, 1996	Jd'	Jd' Star	Cooga, Cynthia Moreno, and Lioness Asuka vs. Kumiko Maekawa, Yoshiko Tamura, and Yumiko Hotta		
January 4, 1997	NJPW; BJW	Wrestling World 1997	Shinya Hashimoto (c) vs. Riki Choshu for the IWGP Heavyweight Championship		
April 12, 1997	NJPW	Battle Formation 1997	Naoya Ogawa vs. Shinya Hashimoto		
January 4, 1998	NJPW	Final Power Hall	Kensuke Sasaki (c) vs. Keiji Mutoh for the IWGP Heavyweight Championship		
April 4, 1998	NJPW	Antonio Inoki Retirement Show	Antonio Inoki vs. Don Frye		
May 1, 1998	AJPW	AJPW's 25th Anniversary	Toshiaki Kawada vs. Mitsuharu Misawa (c) for the Triple Crown Heavyweight Championship		
January 4, 1999	NJPW	Wrestling World 1999	Keiji Mutoh vs. Scott Norton (c) for the IWGP Heavyweight Championship		
April 10, 1999	NJPW	Strong Style Symphony	Keiji Mutoh (c) vs. Don Frye for the IWGP Heavyweight Championship		
May 2, 1999	AJPW	Giant Baba Memorial Show	Mitsuharu Misawa vs. Vader (c) for the Triple Crown Heavyweight Championship		
October 11, 1999	NJPW	Final Dome	Naoya Ogawa (c) vs. Shinya Hashimoto for the NWA World Heavyweight Championship; Tatsumi Fujinami served as the guest referee		
January 4, 2000	NJPW	Wrestling World 2000	Kensuke Sasaki vs. Genichiro Tenryu (c) for the IWGP Heavyweight Championship		
April 7, 2000	NJPW	Dome Impact	Naoya Ogawa vs. Shinya Hashimoto		
October 9, 2000	NJPW	Do Judge!!	Toshiaki Kawada vs. Kensuke Sasaki		
January 4, 2001	NJPW	Wrestling World 2001	Kensuke Sasaki vs. Toshiaki Kawada for the vacant IWGP Heavyweight Championship		
January 28, 2001	AJPW; NJPW	Giant Baba Memorial Spectacular	Toshiaki Kawada and Kensuke Sasaki vs. Genichiro Tenryu and Hiroshi Hase		
October 8, 2001	NJPW	Indicate of Next	Yuji Nagata and Jun Akiyama vs. Hiroshi Hase and Keiji Mutoh		
January 4, 2002	NJPW	Wrestling World 2002	Jun Akiyama (c) vs. Yuji Nagata for the GHC Heavyweight Championship		
May 2, 2002	NJPW	NJPW's 30th Anniversary	Mitsuharu Misawa vs. Masahiro Chono		
August 8, 2002	UFO	Legend	Naoya Ogawa vs. Matt Ghaffari		
October 14, 2002	NJPW	Spiral	Yuji Nagata (c) vs. Kazuyuki Fujita for the IWGP Heavyweight Championship		
January 4, 2003	NJPW	Wrestling World 2003	Yuji Nagata (c) vs. Josh Barnett for the IWGP Heavyweight Championship		
January 19, 2003	AJPW	2nd Wrestle-1	Ernesto Hoost vs. Bob Sapp		
May 1, 2003	NJPW	Ultimate Festival	New Japan Alumnus Battle Royal		
May 2, 2003	NJPW	Ultimate Crush	Yoshihiro Takayama (c – NWF) vs. Yuji Nagata (c – IWGP) for the IWGP Heavyweight Championship and the NWF Heavyweight Championship		
October 13, 2003	NJPW	Ultimate Crush II	Yoshihiro Takayama, Kazuyuki Fujita, Minoru Suzuki, Shinsuke Nakamura, and Bob Sapp vs. Hiroyoshi Tenzan, Yuji Nagata, Manabu Nakanishi, Hiroshi Tanahashi, and Seiji Sakaguchi		
January 4, 2004	NJPW	Wrestling World 2004	Shinsuke Nakamura (c – IWGP) vs. Yoshihiro Takayama (c – NWF) for the IWGP Heavyweight Championship and the NWF Heavyweight Championship		
May 3, 2004	NJPW	Nexess	Bob Sapp (c) vs. Shinsuke Nakamura for the IWGP Heavyweight Championship		
July 10, 2004	Noah	Departure	Kenta Kobashi (c) vs. Jun Akiyama for the GHC Heavyweight Championship		
January 4, 2005	NJPW	Toukon Festival: Wrestling World 2005	Shinsuke Nakamura vs. Hiroshi Tanahashi (c) for the IWGP U-30 Openweight Championship		
May 14, 2005	NJPW	Nexess VI	Hiroyoshi Tenzan vs. Satoshi Kojima (c) for the IWGP Heavyweight Championship		
July 18, 2005	Noah	Destiny	Mitsuharu Misawa vs. Toshiaki Kawada		
October 8, 2005	NJPW	Toukon Souzou New Chapter	Brock Lesnar vs. Kazuyuki Fujita (c) and Masahiro Chono in a three-way match for the IWGP Heavyweight Championship		
January 4, 2006	NJPW	Toukon Shidou Chapter 1	Brock Lesnar (c) vs. Shinsuke Nakamura for the IWGP Heavyweight Championship		
January 4, 2007	NJPW; AJPW	Wrestle Kingdom	Keiji Mutoh and Masahiro Chono vs. Tencozy (Hiroyoshi Tenzan and Satoshi Kojima)		
January 4, 2008	NJPW; TNA	Wrestle Kingdom II	Shinsuke Nakamura vs. Hiroshi Tanahashi (c) for the IWGP Heavyweight Championship	Aired in the United States as TNA Global Impact on January 17, 2008	
January 4, 2009	NJPW; TNA	Wrestle Kingdom III	Hiroshi Tanahashi vs. Keiji Mutoh (c) for the IWGP Heavyweight Championship	Aired in the United States as TNA Global Impact 2 on October 8, 2009	
January 4, 2010	NJPW	Wrestle Kingdom IV	Shinsuke Nakamura (c) vs. Yoshihiro Takayama for the IWGP Heavyweight Championship		
January 4, 2011	NJPW; TNA	Wrestle Kingdom V	Hiroshi Tanahashi vs. Satoshi Kojima (c) for the IWGP Heavyweight Championship	Aired in the United States as TNA Global Impact 3 on February 24, 2011	
January 4, 2012	NJPW	Wrestle Kingdom VI	Hiroshi Tanahashi (c) vs. Minoru Suzuki for the IWGP Heavyweight Championship		
January 4, 2013	NJPW	Wrestle Kingdom 7	Hiroshi Tanahashi (c) vs. Kazuchika Okada for the IWGP Heavyweight Championship		
January 4, 2014	NJPW	Wrestle Kingdom 8	Hiroshi Tanahashi vs. Shinsuke Nakamura (c) for the IWGP Intercontinental Championship		
January 4, 2015	NJPW; GFW	Wrestle Kingdom 9	Hiroshi Tanahashi (c) vs. Kazuchika Okada for the IWGP Heavyweight Championship	Aired live in the United States on PPV as a presentation of GFW	
January 4, 2016	NJPW	Wrestle Kingdom 10	Kazuchika Okada (c) vs. Hiroshi Tanahashi for the IWGP Heavyweight Championship		
January 4, 2017	NJPW	Wrestle Kingdom 11	Kazuchika Okada (c) vs. Kenny Omega for the IWGP Heavyweight Championship		
June 1, 2017	DDT	Street Wrestling in Tokyo Dome	Minoru Suzuki vs. Sanshiro Takagi		
January 4, 2018	NJPW	Wrestle Kingdom 12	Kazuchika Okada (c) vs. Tetsuya Naito for the IWGP Heavyweight Championship		
January 4, 2019	NJPW	Wrestle Kingdom 13	Hiroshi Tanahashi vs. Kenny Omega (c) for the IWGP Heavyweight Championship		
January 4, 2020	NJPW	Wrestle Kingdom 14 (Night 1)	Kazuchika Okada (c) vs. Kota Ibushi for the IWGP Heavyweight Championship		
January 5, 2020	NJPW	Wrestle Kingdom 14 (Night 2)	Tetsuya Naito (c – Intercontinental) vs. Kazuchika Okada (c – Heavyweight) for the IWGP Heavyweight Championship and the IWGP Intercontinental Championship		
January 4, 2021	NJPW	Wrestle Kingdom 15 (Night 1)	Kota Ibushi vs. Tetsuya Naito (c) for the IWGP Heavyweight Championship and the IWGP Intercontinental Championship		
January 5, 2021	NJPW	Wrestle Kingdom 15 (Night 2)	Kota Ibushi (c) vs. Jay White for the IWGP Heavyweight Championship and the IWGP Intercontinental Championship		
July 25, 2021	NJPW	Wrestle Grand Slam in Tokyo Dome	Shingo Takagi (c) vs. Hiroshi Tanahashi for the IWGP World Heavyweight Championship		
October 31, 2021	DDT	Tokyo Dome Cup	The 37Kamiina (Konosuke Takeshita, Mao, Shunma Katsumata, and Yuki Ueno) vs. Brahman Brothers (Brahman Kei and Brahman Shu), Chris Brookes, and Gorgeous Matsuno, and 121000000 (Maki Itoh and Miyu Yamashita), Hikari Noa, and Hyper Misao, and Pheromones (Danshoku Dino, Yuki Iino and Yumehito Imanari), and Tetsuya Endo and Kazuki Hirata, Kazusada Higuchi, Kouzi and Shinya Aoki		
January 4, 2022	NJPW; Noah	Wrestle Kingdom 16 (Night 1)	Kazuchika Okada vs. Shingo Takagi (c) for the IWGP World Heavyweight Championship		
January 5, 2022	NJPW; Noah	Wrestle Kingdom 16 (Night 2)	Kazuchika Okada (c) vs. Will Ospreay for the IWGP World Heavyweight Championship		
January 4, 2023	NJPW; Noah	Wrestle Kingdom 17 (Night 1)	Kazuchika Okada vs. Jay White (c) for the IWGP World Heavyweight Championship		
February 21, 2023	Noah	Keiji Muto Grand Final Pro-Wrestling "Last" Love	Masahiro Chono vs. Keiji Muto		
January 4, 2024	NJPW	Wrestle Kingdom 18	Tetsuya Naito vs. Sanada (c) for the IWGP World Heavyweight Championship		
January 4, 2025	NJPW	Wrestle Kingdom 19	Zack Sabre Jr. (c) vs. Shota Umino for the IWGP World Heavyweight Championship		
January 5, 2025	AEW; NJPW; CMLL; ROH; Stardom	Wrestle Dynasty	Zack Sabre Jr. (c) vs. Ricochet for the IWGP World Heavyweight Championship		
January 4, 2026	NJPW	Wrestle Kingdom 20	Hiroshi Tanahashi vs. Kazuchika Okada		
