= List of professional wrestling attendance records in Japan =

List of the largest attendances in the history of Japanese professional wrestling

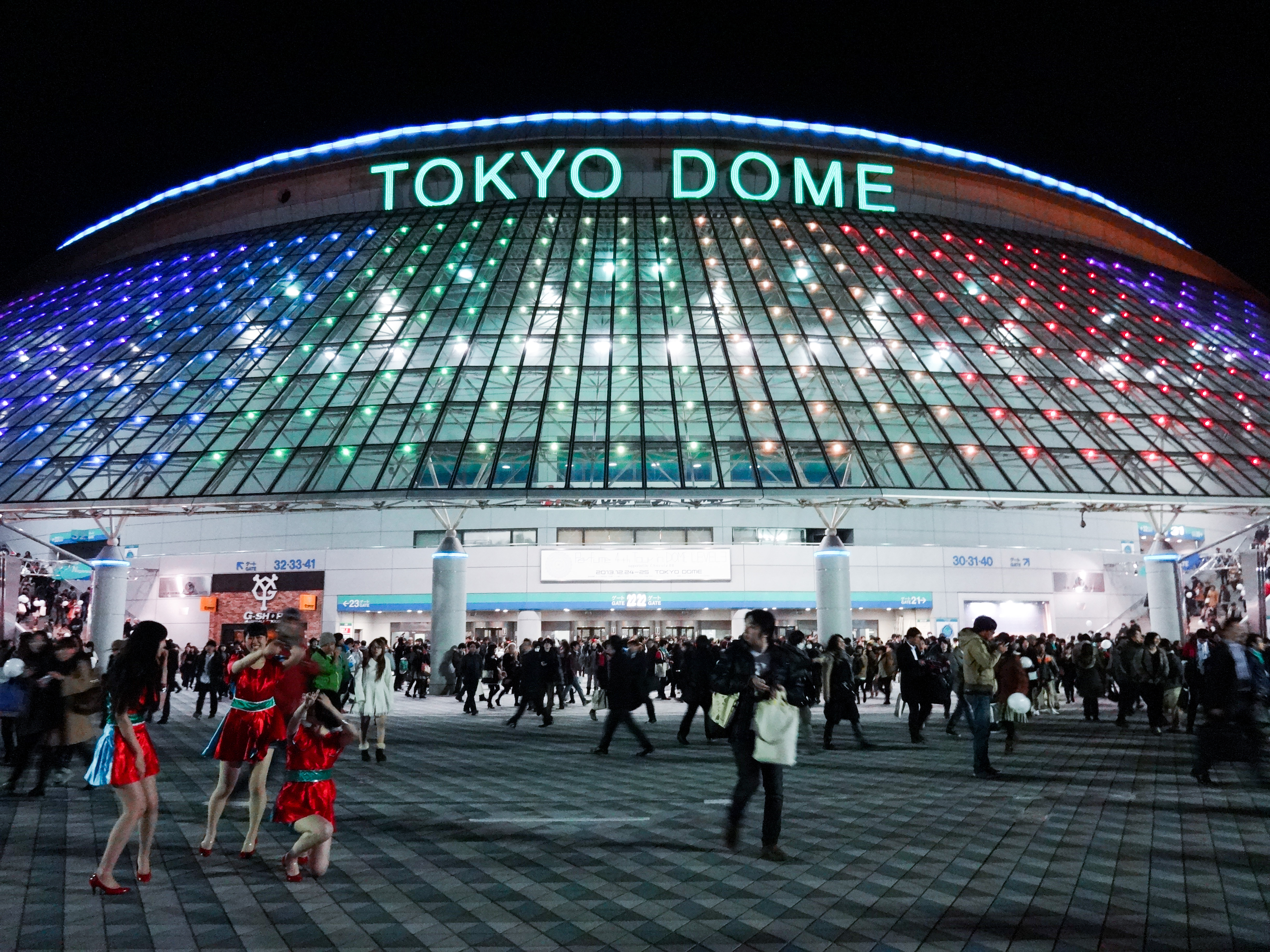
The Tokyo Dome, one of Japan's biggest sport stadiums, holds several national and world pro wrestling attendance records. The average attendance for professional wrestling at the Tokyo Dome consistently exceeded 50,000 fans from 1989 to 1999.

The following is a list of professional wrestling attendance records in Japan. The list is dominated by the country's largest promotion, New Japan Pro-Wrestling (NJPW). The company was founded by Antonio Inoki in 1972 and had a long rivalry with Giant Baba's All Japan Pro Wrestling. AJPW set a number of attendance records during its heyday, especially during the 1990s wrestling boom, however, only three of its shows remain on the list as of 2023.

According to this list, 5 events are from NJPW's flagship Wrestling World supercard event, which since 1992's Super Warriors in Tokyo Dome has been held exclusively at the Tokyo Dome which typically has a seating capacity of at least 42,000 people or more. Only six of the attendances listed are non-NJPW events, with the Weekly Pro Wrestling Tokyo Dome Show being an interpromotional event involving over a dozen Japanese promotions. In addition, NJPW has hosted three co-promotional events each with the U.S.-based World Championship Wrestling, two with the Japan-based UWF International, and one with deathmatch promotion Big Japan Pro Wrestling. All but two of the events have been held at the Tokyo Dome in the Japanese capital city of Tokyo, while one has been held at Sun Beach in Atami, Japan and one at Kawasaki Stadium in Kawasaki, Japan.

== Events and attendances ==
Promotion	Event	Location	Venue	Attendance	Main Event(s)	Ref.
NJPW	Antonio Inoki Retirement Show; April 4, 1998	Tokyo, Japan	Tokyo Dome	70,000	Antonio Inoki vs. Don Frye	
NJPW / UWFi	NJPW vs. UWFi; October 9, 1995	Tokyo, Japan	Tokyo Dome	67,000	Keiji Muto (NJPW) vs. Nobuhiko Takada (UWFI) in a Champion vs. Champion match for the IWGP Heavyweight Championship and UWFI Heavyweight Championship	
AJPW	Giant Baba Memorial Show; May 2, 1999	Tokyo, Japan	Tokyo Dome	65,000	Vader vs. Mitsuharu Misawa for the Triple Crown Heavyweight Championship	
NJPW	Battle Formation; April 29, 1996	Tokyo, Japan	Tokyo Dome	65,000	Nobuhiko Takada (c) vs. Shinya Hashimoto for the IWGP Heavyweight Championship	
TPW	Battle Entertainment; July 23, 1996	Atami, Japan	Sun Beach	65,000	Abdullah the Butcher and Daikokubo Benkei vs. Kishin Kawabata and Takashi Ishikawa	
NJPW	Final Power Hall in Tokyo Dome; January 4, 1998	Tokyo, Japan	Tokyo Dome	65,000	Kensuke Sasaki (c) vs. Keiji Mutoh for the IWGP Heavyweight Championship	
NJPW / WCW	Starrcade in Tokyo Dome; March 21, 1991	Tokyo, Japan	Tokyo Dome	64,500	Tatsumi Fujinami (c - NJPW) vs. Ric Flair (c - NWA) in a Champion vs. Champion match for the IWGP Heavyweight Championship and NWA World Heavyweight Championships	
NJPW / UWFi	Wrestling World 1996; January 4, 1996	Tokyo, Japan	Tokyo Dome	64,000	Keiji Mutoh (c - NJPW) vs. Nobuhiko Takada (UWFi) for the IWGP Heavyweight Championship	
NJPW	Do Judge!! October 9, 2000	Tokyo, Japan	Tokyo Dome	64,000	Toshiaki Kawada vs. Kensuke Sasaki	
NJPW	Super Fight in Tokyo Dome; February 10, 1990	Tokyo, Japan	Tokyo Dome	63,900	Antonio Inoki and Seiji Sakaguchi vs. Masahiro Chono and Shinya Hashimoto with special referee Lou Thesz	
NJPW / WCW	Fantastic Story in Tokyo Dome; January 4, 1993	Tokyo, Japan	Tokyo Dome	63,500	Genichiro Tenryu vs. Riki Choshu	
NJPW	Strong Style Symphony: New Japan Spirit; April 10, 1999	Tokyo, Japan	Tokyo Dome	63,500	Keiji Muto (c) vs. Don Frye for the IWGP Heavyweight Championship	
NJPW	Wrestling World 2000; January 4, 2000	Tokyo, Japan	Tokyo Dome	63,500	Genichiro Tenryu (c) vs. Kensuke Sasaki for the IWGP Heavyweight Championship	
NJPW	Battle 7 January 4, 1995	Tokyo, Japan	Tokyo Dome	62,500	Shinya Hashimoto (c) vs. Kensuke Sasaki for the IWGP Heavyweight Championship	
NJPW / BJW	Wrestling World 1997; January 4, 1997	Tokyo, Japan	Tokyo Dome	62,500	Shinya Hashimoto (c) vs. Riki Choshu for the IWGP Heavyweight Championship	
NJPW	Wrestling World 1999; January 4, 1999	Tokyo, Japan	Tokyo Dome	62,500	Scott Norton (c) vs. Keiji Mutoh for the IWGP Heavyweight Championship	
NJPW	Battlefield; January 4, 1994	Tokyo, Japan	Tokyo Dome	62,000	Antonio Inoki vs. Genichiro Tenryu	
NJPW	Wrestling World 2001; January 4, 2001	Tokyo, Japan	Tokyo Dome	62,000	Kensuke Sasaki vs. Toshiaki Kawada in a tournament final for the IWGP Heavyweight Championship	
NOAH	Destiny; July 18, 2005	Tokyo, Japan	Tokyo Dome	62,000	Toshiaki Kawada vs. Mitsuharu Misawa	
NJPW	Indicate of Next; October 8, 2001	Tokyo, Japan	Tokyo Dome	61,500	Jun Akiyama and Yuji Nagata vs. BATT (Hiroshi Hase and Keiji Muto)	
NJPW	Battle Formation; April 12, 1997	Tokyo, Japan	Tokyo Dome	60,500	Shinya Hashimoto vs. Naoya Ogawa	
UWF	U-Cosmos; November 29, 1989	Tokyo, Japan	Tokyo Dome	60,000	Akira Maeda vs. Willie Wilhelm in a "Wrestler vs. Judoka" match	
NJPW / WCW	Super Warriors in Tokyo Dome; January 4, 1992	Tokyo, Japan	Tokyo Dome	60,000	Tatsumi Fujinami (c – IWGP) vs. Riki Choshu (c – Greatest 18) in a Champion vs. Champion match for the IWGP Heavyweight and Greatest 18 Club Championships	
Multi-promotional	Weekly Pro Wrestling Tokyo Dome Show; April 2, 1995	Tokyo, Japan	Tokyo Dome	60,000	Shinya Hashimoto vs. Masahiro Chono	
NJPW	Dome Impact; April 7, 2000	Tokyo, Japan	Tokyo Dome	60,000	Shinya Hashimoto vs. Naoya Ogawa	
NJPW	Final Dome; October 11, 1999	Tokyo, Japan	Tokyo Dome	58,500	Naoya Ogawa (c) vs. Shinya Hashimoto for the NWA World Heavyweight Championship	
AJPW	King's Road New Century 2001; January 28, 2001	Tokyo, Japan	Tokyo Dome	58,700	"Dr. Death" Steve Williams vs. Mike Barton in a revenge match (televised main event on the pay-per-view's initial live broadcast, promoted on TV) Toshiaki Kawada and Kensuke Sasaki vs. Genichiro Tenryu and Hiroshi Hase (dark match main event)	
AJPW	AJPW 25th Anniversary Show; May 1, 1998	Tokyo, Japan	Tokyo Dome	58,300	Mitsuharu Misawa (c) vs. Toshiaki Kawada for the Triple Crown Heavyweight Championship	
FMW	FMW 6th Anniversary Show; May 5, 1995	Kawasaki, Japan	Kawasaki Stadium	58,250	Atsushi Onita (c) vs. Hayabusa in a No Rope Exploding Barbed Wire Deathmatch for the FMW Brass Knuckles Heavyweight Championship	

== Historical ==
Top 10 most-attended shows in the 1950s
No.	Promotion	Event	Location	Venue	Attendance	Main Event(s)
1.	JWA	JWA Pro-Wrestling World Championship Series (Day 1); October 7, 1957	Tokyo, Japan	Korakuen Stadium	30,000	Lou Thesz (c) vs. Rikidozan for the NWA World Heavyweight Championship
1.	JWA	JWA Pro-Wrestling World Championship Series (Day 2); October 13, 1957	Osaka, Japan	Ogimachi Pool	30,000	Lou Thesz (c) vs. Rikidozan in a Best 2-out-of-3 Falls match for the NWA World Heavyweight Championship
3.	JWA	JWA International Big Competition (Day 10); August 1, 1955	Osaka, Japan	Ogimachi Pool	25,000	Mitsuhiro Rikidozan and Kin'ichi Azumafuji (c) vs. Jesús Ortega and Bud Curtis in a Best 2-out-of-3 Falls match for the NWA Hawaii Tag Team Championship
4.	JWA	JWA Pacific Coast Championship (Day 14); August 22, 1954	Utsunomiya, Japan	Josetsu Stadium	20,000	Mitsuhiro Rikidozan and Kokichi Endo vs. Hans Schnabel and Lou Newman in a Best 2-out-of-3 Falls match
4.	JWA	JWA Pacific Coast Championship (Day 15); August 23, 1954	Takasaki, Japan	Jonan Baseball Stadium	20,000	Mitsuhiro Rikidozan and Kokichi Endo vs. Hans Schnabel and Lou Newman in a Best 2-out-of-3 Falls match
4.	JWA	JWA International Big Competition (Day 35); September 4, 1955	Kawasaki, Japan	Kawasaki Stadium	20,000	Mitsuhiro Rikidozan and Kin'ichi Azumafuji (c) vs. Jesús Ortega and Bud Curtis in a Best 2-out-of-3 Falls match
5.	JWA	JWA Asia Championships (Day 6); November 14, 1955	Tokyo, Japan	Kuramae Kokugikan	18,000	Mitsuhiro Rikidozan and Harold Sakata vs. Dara Singh and Syed Saif Shah in a Best 2-out-of-3 Falls match
5.	JWA	JWA World League (Day 14); June 8, 1959	Kure, Japan	Municipal Niko Pool	18,000	Danny Plechas vs. Tarlok Singh in a World League tournament match Kokichi Endo vs. Lord Blears in a World League tournament match
6.	JWA	JWA Opening Series (Day 13); March 6, 1954	Tokyo, Japan	Ryogoku Kokugikan	15,000	The Sharpe Brothers (Ben Sharpe and Mike Sharpe) (c) vs. Rikidozan and Masahiko Kimura in a Best 2-out-of-3 Falls match for the NWA World Tag Team Championship
6.	JWA	JWA Pacific Coast Championship (Day 1); August 6, 1954	Tokyo, Japan	Metropolitan Gymnasium	15,000	Mitsuhiro Rikidozan and Mitsuo Surugaumi vs. Hans Schnabel and Lou Newman in a Best 2-out-of-3 Falls match
6.	JWA	JWA Pacific Coast Championship (Day 2); August 7, 1954	Tokyo, Japan	Metropolitan Gymnasium	15,000	Mitsuhiro Rikidozan vs. Hans Schnabel in a Best 2-out-of-3 Falls match
6.	JWA	JWA Pacific Coast Championship (Day 3); August 8, 1954	Tokyo, Japan	Metropolitan Gymnasium	15,000	Hans Schnabel and Lou Newman (c) vs. Rikidozan and Masahiko Kimura in a Best 2-out-of-3 Falls match for the NWA Pacific Coast Tag Team Championship
6.	JWA	JWA Pacific Coast Championship (Day 16); August 25, 1954	Tokyo, Japan	Metropolitan Gymnasium	15,000	Mitsuhiro Rikidozan, Kokichi Endo and Oki Shikina vs. Hans Schnabel, Lou Newman and Dr. Bob Olson in a Best 2-out-of-3 Falls match for the Mainichi Cup
6.	JWA	JWA Pacific Coast Championship (Day 28); September 10, 1954	Osaka, Japan	Osaka Prefectural Gymnasium	15,000	Hans Schnabel and Lou Newman (c) vs. Mitsuhiro Rikidozan and Kokichi Endo in a Best 2-out-of-3 Falls match for the NWA Pacific Coast Tag Team Championship
6.	JWA	JWA Pacific Coast Championship (Day 36); September 21, 1954	Tokyo, Japan	Metropolitan Gymnasium	15,000	Mitsuhiro Rikidozan and Kokichi Endo (c) vs. Hans Schnabel and Lou Newman in a Best 2-out-of-3 Falls match for the NWA Pacific Coast Tag Team Championship
6.	SKS	World Ladies' Pro-Wrestling Big Competitions; November 19, 1954	Tokyo, Japan	Kuramae Kokugikan	15,000	Mae Young and Ruth Boatcallie vs. Gloria Barattini and Rita Martinez in a Best 2-out-of-3 Falls match
6.	JWA	JWA International Big Competition (Day 8); July 28, 1955	Tokyo, Japan	Korakuen Stadium	15,000	Mitsuhiro Rikidozan and Kin'ichi Azumafuji (c) vs. Jesús Ortega and Bud Curtis in a Best 2 out of 3 Falls match for the NWA Hawaii Tag Team Championship
6.	JWA	JWA International Big Competition (Day 9); July 31, 1955	Saitama, Japan	Omiya Park Athletics Stadium and Bicycle Racetrack	15,000	Mitsuhiro Rikidozan and Kin'ichi Azumafuji vs. Bob Orton and Bud Curtis in a Best-2-out-of-3 Falls match
6.	JWA	JWA International Big Competition (Day 14); August 6, 1955	Kochi, Japan	Sumo Ring	15,000	Mitsuhiro Rikidozan and Kin'ichi Azumafuji vs. Jesús Ortega and Bud Curtis in a Best 2 out of 3 Falls match
6.	JWA	JWA International Big Competition (Day 19); August 13, 1955	Kumamoto, Japan	Sirakawa Park	15,000	Mitsuhiro Rikidozan and Kokichi Endo vs. Jesús Ortega and Bob Orton in a Best 2 out of 3 Falls match
6.	JWA	JWA Asia Championships (Day 10); November 22, 1955	Tokyo, Japan	Kuramae Kokugikan	15,000	Rikidozan vs. King Kong in a tournament final for the All Asia Heavyweight Championship
6.	JWA	JWA International Big Competition (Day 1); April 24, 1956	Tokyo, Japan	Kuramae Kokugikan	15,000	Mitsuhiro Rikidozan and Kokichi Endo vs. The Sharpe Brothers (Ben Sharpe and Mike Sharpe) in a Best 2-out-of-3 Falls match
6.	JWA	JWA International Big Competition (Day 2); April 25, 1956	Tokyo, Japan	Kuramae Kokugikan	15,000	Mitsuhiro Rikidozan vs. Mike Sharpe in a Best 2-out-of-3 Falls match
6.	JWA	JWA International Big Competition (Day 31); June 7, 1956	Tokyo, Japan	Kuramae Kokugikan	15,000	The Sharpe Brothers (Ben Sharpe and Mike Sharpe) (c) vs. Mitsuhiro Rikidozan and Kokichi Endo in a Best 2-out-of-3 Falls match for the NWA World Tag Team Championship
6.	JWA	JWA Pro-Wrestling World Championship Series (Day 5); October 17, 1957	Kobe, Japan	Ohji Gymnasium	15,000	Lou Thesz vs. Rikidozan in a Best 2-out-of-3 Falls match
6.	JWA	JWA Pro-Wrestling World Championship Series (Day 9); October 25, 1957	Naha, Japan	Kumoji Park	15,000	Lou Thesz vs. Rikidozan in a Best 2-out-of-3 Falls match
6.	JWA	JWA World League (Day 1); May 21, 1959	Tokyo, Japan	Metropolitan Gymnasium	15,000	Rikidozan vs. Jesús Ortega in a World League tournament
6.	JWA	JWA World League (Day 2); May 22, 1959	Tokyo, Japan	Metropolitan Gymnasium	15,000	Rikidozan and Toyonobori vs. Jesús Ortega and King Kong Czaya in a Best 2-out-of-3 Falls match
6.	JWA	JWA World League (Day 19); June 15, 1959	Tokyo, Japan	Metropolitan Gymnasium	15,000	Rikidozan vs. Jesús Ortega in a World League tournament final
7.	JWA	JWA Pacific Coast Championship (Day 26); September 8, 1954	Osaka, Japan	Osaka Prefectural Gymnasium	14,000	Mitsuhiro Rikidozan and Mitsuo Surugaumi vs. Hans Schnabel and Lou Newman in a Best 2-out-of-3 Falls Match
8.	JWA	JWA Opening Series (Day 1); February 19, 1954	Tokyo, Japan	Ryogoku Kokugikan	13,000	The Sharpe Brothers (Ben Sharpe and Mike Sharpe) (c) vs. Rikidozan and Masahiko Kimura in a Best 2-out-of-3 Falls match for the NWA World Tag Team Championship
8.	JWA	JWA Japanese Championship; December 22, 1954	Tokyo, Japan	Kuramae Kokugikan	13,000	Mitsuhiro Rikidozan vs. Masahiko Kimura in a Best-2-out-of-3 Falls match for the inaugural Japanese Heavyweight Championship
8.	JWA	JWA Opening Series (Day 2); February 20, 1954	Tokyo, Japan	Ryogoku Kokugikan	13,000	Rikidozan vs. Ben Sharpe in a Best 2-out-of-3 Falls match
8.	JWA	JWA Opening Series (Day 3); February 21, 1954	Tokyo, Japan	Ryogoku Kokugikan	13,000	The Sharpe Brothers (Ben Sharpe and Mike Sharpe) (c) vs. Rikidozan and Masahiko Kimura in a Best 2-out-of-3 Falls match for the NWA World Tag Team Championship
8.	JWA	JWA Opening Series (Day 15); March 9, 1954	Tokyo, Japan	Ryogoku Kokugikan	13,000	The Sharpe Brothers (Ben Sharpe and Mike Sharpe) (c) vs. Rikidozan and Bobby Bruns in a Best 2-out-of-3 Falls match
8.	SKS	World Ladies' Pro-Wrestling Big Competitions; November 23, 1954	Osaka, Japan	Osaka Prefectural Gymnasium	13,000	Mae Young and Ruth Boatcallie vs. Gloria Barattini and Rita Martinez in a Best 2-out-of-3 Falls match
8.	JWA	JWA International Big Competition (Day 2); July 16, 1955	Tokyo, Japan	Kuramae Kokugikan	13,000	Mitsuhiro Rikidozan and Mitsuo Surugaumi vs. Bob Orton and Hardy Kruskamp in a Best 2-out-of-3 Falls match
8.	JWA	JWA International Big Competition (Day 3); July 17, 1955	Tokyo, Japan	Kuramae Kokugikan	13,000	Mitsuhiro Rikidozan vs. Primo Carnera in a Best 2-out-of-3 Falls match
8.	JWA	JWA International Big Competition (Day 3); April 26, 1956	Tokyo, Japan	Kuramae Kokugikan	13,000	The Sharpe Brothers (Ben Sharpe and Mike Sharpe) (c) vs. Mitsuhiro Rikidozan and Kokichi Endo in a Best 2-out-of-3 Falls match for the NWA World Tag Team Championship
8.	JWA	JWA Pro-Wrestling World Championship Series (Day 8); October 24, 1957	Naha, Japan	Kumoji Park	13,000	Rikidozan and Toyonobori vs. Lou Thesz and Danny Plechas in a Best 2-out-of-3 Falls match
9.	JWA	JWA Pacific Coast Championship (Day 27); September 9, 1954	Osaka, Japan	Osaka Prefectural Gymnasium	12,000	Mitsuhiro Rikidozan, Kokichi Endo and Mitsuo Surugaumi vs. Hans Schnabel, Lou Newman and Dr. Bob Olson in a Best 2-out-of-3 Falls match
9.	JWA	Tokyo Governor Cup Tournament; October 1, 1954	Tokyo, Japan	Metropolitan Gymnasium	12,000	Mitsuhiro Rikidozan vs. Junzo Yoshinosato, Mitsuo Surugaumi and Kokichi Endo in an elimination match for the Tokyo Governor Cup
9.	JWA	JWA International Big Competition (Day 1); July 15, 1955	Tokyo, Japan	Kuramae Kokugikan	12,000	Mitsuhiro Rikidozan and Kin'ichi Azumafuji vs. Primo Carnera and Hardy Kruskamp in a Best 2-out-of-3 Falls match
9.	JWA	JWA International Big Competition (Day 6); July 23, 1955	Osaka, Japan	Osaka Prefectural Gymnasium	12,000	Mitsuhiro Rikidozan and Kokichi Endo vs. Bob Orton and Bud Curtis in a Best 2-out-of-3 Falls match
9.	JWA	JWA International Big Competition (Day 37); September 7, 1955	Tokyo, Japan	Metropolitan Gymnasium	12,000	Mitsuhiro Rikidozan vs. Jesús Ortega in a Best 2-out-of-3 Falls match for the Mainichi Cup
9.	JWA	JWA International Big Competition (Day 7); May 3, 1956	Osaka, Japan	Osaka Prefectural Gymnasium	12,000	Rikidozan vs. Lucky Simunovich in a Best 2-out-of-3 Falls match
9.	JWA	JWA International Big Competition (Day 27); June 2, 1956	Fukuoka, Japan	Fukuoka Sports Center	12,000	The Sharpe Brothers (Ben Sharpe and Mike Sharpe) (c) vs. Mitsuhiro Rikidozan and Kokichi Endo in a Best 2-out-of-3 Falls match for the NWA World Tag Team Championship
9.	JWA	JWA International Competitions of the Fall; August 14, 1957	Tokyo, Japan	Metropolitan Gymnasium	12,000	Rikidozan vs. Bobo Brazil in a Best 2-out-of-3 Falls match
9.	JWA	JWA 1st Annual World League (Day 5); May 26, 1959	Osaka, Japan	Osaka Prefectural Gymnasium	12,000	Rikidozan and Toyonobori vs. Lord Blears and Danny Plechas in a Best 2-out-of-3 Falls match
9.	JWA	JWA 1st Annual World League (Day 7); May 28, 1959	Osaka, Japan	Osaka Prefectural Gymnasium	12,000	Rikidozan vs. King Kong Czaya in a World League tournament match
10.	JWA	JWA Asia Championships (Day 7); November 15, 1955	Tokyo, Japan	Kuramae Kokugikan	11,000	Mitsuhiro Rikidozan and Harold Sakata vs. King Kong and Tiger Joginder Singh in a Best 2-out-of-3 Falls match for the inaugural All Asia Tag Team Championship

Top 10 most-attended shows in the 1960s
No.	Promotion	Event	Location	Venue	Attendance	Main Event(s)
1.	JWA	World Big League; May 7, 1961	Nara, Japan	Ayame Pond Amusement Park	36,000	Rikidozan and Toyonobori vs. Jim Wright and Mr. X in a Best 2-out-of-3 Falls match
2.	JWA	Summer Series I (Day 15); August 14, 1967	Osaka, Japan	Osaka Baseball Stadium	25,000	Giant Baba (c) vs. Gene Kiniski in a Best 2-out-of-3 Falls match for the NEPW International Heavyweight Championship
3.	JWA	Yasukuni Shrine Festival; April 23, 1961	Tokyo, Japan	Yasukuni Shrine Sumo/Wrestling Place	20,000	Giant Baba and Kintaro Oki vs. Tosanohana and Hideyuki Nagasawa in a Best 2-out-of-3 Falls match
4.	JWA	International Competitions of the Fall (Day 18); October 3, 1962	Kitami, Japan	Kitami Bus Garage	18,000	Rikidozan, Kokichi Endo and Mammoth Suzuki vs. Moose Cholak, Art Michalik and Skull Murphy in a Best 2-out-of-3 Falls match
4.	JWA	Summer Series I (Day 18); August 2, 1968	Sendai, Japan	Miyagi Prefectural Sports Center	18,000	Giant Baba vs. Bruno Sammartino in a Best 2-out-of-3 Falls match
5.	JWA	JWA International Competitions - Okinawa Series (Day 3); November 5, 1962	Naha, Japan	Asahibashi Square	17,000	Rikidozan and Toyonobori (c) defeated Art Michalik and Chief Big Heart in a Best 2-out-of-3 Falls match for the All Asia Tag Team Championship
5.	JWA	JWA International Competitions of the Fall (Day 14); October 4, 1963	Nagano, Japan	Civic Hall Square	17,000	Rikidozan and Yoshino Sato vs. Buddy Austin and Ilio DiPaolo in a Best 2-out-of-3 Falls match
6.	JWA	World Big League (Day 2); May 2, 1961	Tokyo, Japan	Metropolitan Gymnasium	15,000	Rikidozan and Toyonobori vs. Mr. X and Ike Eakins
6.	JWA	JWA International Competitions - New Year Series (Day 2); January 12, 1962	Kisarazu, Japan	Egawa Air Self-Defense Forces Gymnasium	15,000	Rikidozan and Michiaki Yoshimura vs. Ronnie Etchison and Rocky Hamilton in a Best 2-out-of-3 Falls match
6.	JWA	World Big League (Day 10); April 29, 1962	Hiroshima, Japan	Civic Stadium	15,000	Rikidozan, Great Togo and Michiaki Yoshimura vs. Larry Hennig, Duke Hoffman and Mike Sharpe in a Best 2-out-of-3 Falls match
6.	JWA	JWA International Competitions of the Fall (Day 33); October 22, 1962	Nakatane, Japan	Town Field	15,000	Rikidozan, Kokichi Endo and Michiaki Yoshimura vs. Art Michalik, Gorilla Marconi and Skull Murphy in a Best 2-out-of-3 Falls match
6.	JWA	JWA International Competitions - Okinawa Series (Day 2); November 4, 1962	Naha, Japan	Asahibashi Square	15,000	Rikidozan, Mammoth Suzuki and Toyonobori vs. Moose Cholak, Gorilla Marconi and Skull Murphy in a Best 2-out-of-3 Falls match
6.	JWA	World Big League (Day 23); April 15, 1963	Naha, Japan	Asahibashi Square	15,000	Rikidozan, Great Togo and Giant Baba vs. Pat O'Connor, Killer X and Gino Marella in a Best 2-out-of-3 Falls match
6.	JWA	World Big League (Day 24); April 16, 1963	Naha, Japan	Asahibashi Square	15,000	Rikidozan, Michiaki Yoshimura and Great Togo vs. Killer Kowalski, Pat O'Connor and Killer X in a Best 2-out-of-3 Falls match
6.	JWA	Golden Series (Day 18); June 18, 1966	Kawasaki, Japan	Kawasaki Stadium	15,000	Hiro Matsuda and Michiaki Yoshimura (c) vs. Eddie Graham and Sam Steamboat in a Best 2-out-of-3 Falls match for the All Asia Tag Team Championship
6.	JWA	Summer Series I (Day 2); July 22, 1967	Kawasaki, Japan	Kawasaki Stadium	15,000	Giant Baba and Antonio Inoki vs. Art Mahalik and Jesús Ortega in a Best 2-out-of-3 Falls match
7.	JWA	International Competitions - New Year Series (Day 5); January 19, 1962	Osaka, Japan	Osaka Prefectural Gymnasium	14,000	Rikidozan (c) defeated Ronnie Etchison in a Best 2-out-of-3 Falls match for the All Asia Heavyweight Championship
7.	JWA	Summer Series I (Day 21); August 7, 1968	Osaka, Japan	Osaka Baseball Stadium	14,000	Giant Baba (c) vs. Bruno Sammartino in a Best 2-out-of-3 Falls match for the NWA International Heavyweight Championship
8.	JWA	World Big League (Day 25); June 2, 1961	Tokyo, Japan	Kuramae Kokugikan	13,000	Rikidozan (c) vs. The Great Antonio in a Best 2-out-of-3 Falls match for the NWA International Heavyweight Championship
8.	JWA	World Big League (Day 2); April 21, 1962	Tokyo, Japan	Metropolitan Gymnasium	13,000	Rikidozan and Michiaki Yoshimura vs. Buddy Austin and Mike Sharpe in a Best 2-out-of-3 Falls match
8.	JWA	International Competitions of the Fall (Day 20); October 5, 1962	Sapporo, Japan	Nakajima Sports Center	13,000	Rikidozan and Michiaki Yoshimura (c) vs. Skull Murphy and Gorilla Marconi in a Best 2-out-of-3 Falls match for the All Asia Tag Team Championship
8.	JWA	Golden Series (Day 31); July 5, 1966	Tokyo, Japan	Riki Sports Palace	13,000	Giant Baba (c) vs. Killer Karl Kox in a Best 2-out-of-3 Falls match for the NWA International Heavyweight Championship
9.	JWA	World Big League (Day 4); April 23, 1962	Tokyo, Japan	Metropolitan Gymnasium	12,000	Rikidozan (c) vs. Fred Blassie in a Best 2-out-of-3 Falls match for the NAWA World Heavyweight Championship
9.	JWA	World Big League (Day 9); April 28, 1962	Okayama, Japan	Tsushima Gymnasium	12,000	Rikidozan and Toyonobori vs. Buddy Austin and Larry Hennig in a Best 2-out-of-3 Falls match
9.	JWA	World Big League (Day 11); April 30, 1962	Fukuoka, Japan	Fukuoka Sports Center	12,000	Rikidozan, Kokichi Endo and Toyonobori vs. Lou Thesz, Buddy Austin and Larry Hennig in a Best 2-out-of-3 Falls match
9.	JWA	Selection Series (Day 19); June 18, 1962	Hiroshima, Japan	Prefectural Gymnasium	12,000	Mike Sharpe and Buddy Austin (c) vs. Rikidozan and Toyonobori in a Best 2-out-of-3 Falls match for the All Asia Tag Team Championship
9.	JWA	Selection Series (Day 27); July 1, 1962	Toyonaka, Japan	Daimon Park	12,000	Mike Sharpe and Buddy Austin (c) vs. Rikidozan and Toyonobori in a Best 2-out-of-3 Falls match for the All Asia Tag Team Championship
9.	JWA	International Competitions of the Fall (Day 7); September 20, 1962	Osaka, Japan	Osaka Prefectural Gymnasium	12,000	Rikidozan, Toyonobori and Kokichi Endo vs. Art Michalik, Gorilla Marconi and Skull Murphy in a Best 2-out-of-3 Falls match
9.	JWA	International Competitions of the Fall (Day 39); October 30, 1962	Okayama, Japan	Prefectural Gymnasium	12,000	Rikidozan and Toyonobori vs. Skull Murphy and Gorilla Marconi in a Best 2-out-of-3 Falls match
9.	JWA	International Competitions - Okinawa Series (Day 1); November 3, 1962	Naha, Japan	Asahibashi Square	12,000	Rikidozan and Kokichi Endo vs. Art Michalik and Gorilla Marconi in a Best 2-out-of-3 Falls match
9.	JWA	International Competitions of the Spring (Day 13); January 29, 1963	Osaka, Japan	Osaka Prefectural Gymnasium	12,000	Rikidozan and Michiaki Yoshimura vs. Jess Ortega and Tony Marino in a Best 2-out-of-3 Falls match
9.	JWA	World Big League (Day 30); April 24, 1963	Osaka, Japan	Osaka Prefectural Gymnasium	12,000	Rikidozan (c) vs. Pat O'Connor in a Best 2-out-of-3 Falls match for the NWA International Heavyweight Championship
9.	JWA	WWA World Championship Series (Day 1); May 19, 1963	Osaka, Japan	Osaka Prefectural Gymnasium	12,000	Rikidozan vs. The Destroyer in a Best 2-out-of-3 Falls match
9.	JWA	WWA World Championship Series (Day 4); May 24, 1963	Tokyo, Japan	Metropolitan Gymnasium	12,000	Rikidozan vs. The Destroyer in a Texas Death match
9.	JWA	International Championship Series (Day 7); December 2, 1963	Tokyo, Japan	Metropolitan Gymnasium	12,000	Rikidozan (c) vs. The Destroyer in a Best 2-out-of-3 Falls match for the NWA International Heavyweight Championship
9.	JWA	New Year International Competitions; February 26, 1965	Tokyo, Japan	Metropolitan Gymnasium	12,000	The Destroyer (c) vs. Toyonobori in a Best 2-out-of-3 Falls match for the WWA World Heavyweight Championship
9.	JWA	MSG Series (Day 7); March 7, 1967	Tokyo, Japan	Ryogoku Kokugikan	12,000	Giant Baba (c) vs. Bruno Sammartino in a Best 2-out-of-3 Falls match for the NWA International Heavyweight Championship
9.	JWA	New Year Champion Series (Day 2); January 3, 1968	Tokyo, Japan	Korakuen Hall	12,000	Giant Baba (c) vs. Reggie Lisowski for the NWA International Heavyweight Championship
9.	JWA	Golden Series (Day 31); June 27, 1968	Tokyo, Japan	Ryogoku Kokugikan	12,000	Giant Baba (c) vs. Bobo Brazil in a Best 2-out-of-3 Falls match for the NWA International Heavyweight Championship
9.	JWA	NWA Series (Day 7); November 28, 1969	Tokyo, Japan	Kuramae Kokugikan	12,000	Giant Baba and Antonio Inoki (c) vs. Dory Funk Jr. and Danny Hodge in a Best 2-out-of-3 Falls match for the NWA International Tag Team Championship
10.	JWA	World Big League (Day 20); May 11, 1962	Osaka, Japan	Osaka Prefectural Gymnasium	11,100	Rikidozan vs. Dick Hutton in a Best 2-out-of-3 Falls match

Top 10 most-attended shows in the 1970s
No.	Promotion	Event	Location	Venue	Attendance	Main Event(s)
1.	NJPW	Big Fight Series; March 19, 1974	Tokyo, Japan	Kuramae Kokugikan	16,500	Antonio Inoki (c) vs. Strong Kobayashi for the NWF World Heavyweight Championship with special referee Kiyomigawa
1.	NJPW	Tohkon Series (Day 30); October 10, 1974	Tokyo, Japan	Kuramae Kokugikan	16,500	Antonio Inoki (c) vs. Kintaro Oki for the NWF World Heavyweight Championship
1.	AJPW / IWE / NJPW	Tokyo Sports All-Star Dream Card; August 26, 1979	Tokyo, Japan	Nippon Budokan	16,500	Giant Baba and Antonio Inoki vs. Abdullah the Butcher and Tiger Jeet Singh
2.	NJPW	New Year Golden Series (Day 28); February 6, 1976	Tokyo, Japan	Nippon Budokan	15,000	Antonio Inoki (c) vs. Willem Ruska for the WWF World Martial Arts Heavyweight Championship
3.	AJPW / IWE / JWA	Rikidozan Memorial Show; December 11, 1975	Tokyo, Japan	Nippon Budokan	14,500	Giant Baba and The Destroyer vs. Dory Funk Jr. and Jumbo Tsuruta in a Best 2-out-of-3 Falls match
4.	NJPW	Antonio Inoki vs. Muhammad Ali; June 26, 1976	Tokyo, Japan	Nippon Budokan	14,000	Antonio Inoki (c) vs. Muhammad Ali in a Wrestler vs. Boxer match for the WWF World Martial Arts Heavyweight Championship
5.	NJPW	Antonio Inoki vs. Chuck Wepner; October 25, 1977	Tokyo, Japan	Nippon Budokan	13,500	Antonio Inoki vs. Chuck Wepner in a Wrestler vs. Boxer match
6.	NJPW	Big Fight Series (Day 23); March 18, 1975	Nagoya, Japan	Aichi Prefectural Gymnasium	13,000	Antonio Inoki and Seiji Sakaguchi (c) vs. Tiger Jeet Singh and Mighty Zulu in a Best 2-out-of-3 Falls match for the NWA North American Tag Team Championship
6.	AJW	Maki Ueda vs. Jackie Sato; November 1, 1977	Tokyo, Japan	Nippon Budokan	13,000	Maki Ueda (c) vs. Jackie Sato for the WWWA World Single Championship with special judge Mildred Burke
7.	AJPW	Giant Series (Day 22); October 10, 1974	Suita, Japan	Expo Land Festival Square	12,500	The Destroyer (c) vs. Abdullah the Butcher in a Best 2-out-of-3 Falls match for the PWF United States Heavyweight Championship
7.	AJPW	Real World Tag League (Day 9); December 9, 1978	Tokyo, Japan	Kuramae Kokugikan	12,500	The Funk Brothers (Terry Funk and Dory Funk Jr.) vs. Abdullah the Butcher and The Sheik
7.	AJPW	Real World Tag League (Day 13); December 13, 1979	Tokyo, Japan	Kuramae Kokugikan	12,500	The Funk Brothers (Terry Funk and Dory Funk Jr.) vs. Abdullah the Butcher and The Sheik in a Real World Tag League tournament match
8.	AJPW	Giant Series (Day 3); October 9, 1973	Tokyo, Japan	Kuramae Kokugikan	12,000	The Funk Brothers (Terry Funk and Dory Funk Jr.) (c) vs. Giant Baba and Jumbo Tsuruta in a Best 2-out-of-3 Falls match for the NWA International Tag Team Championship
8.	AJPW	Summer Action Series (Day 7); July 14, 1974	Yaku, Japan	General Ground	12,000	Giant Baba, The Destroyer and Jumbo Tsuruta vs. Bob Backlund, Bob Roop and George "The Animal" Steele in a Best 2-out-of-3 Falls match
8.	NJPW	Big Fight Series (Day 19); March 13, 1975	Hiroshima, Japan	Hiroshima Prefectural Gymnasium	12,000	Antonio Inoki vs. Tiger Jeet Singh for the vacant NWF World Heavyweight Championship
8.	NJPW	Toukon Series II (Day 41); December 11, 1975	Tokyo, Japan	Kuramae Kokugikan	12,000	Antonio Inoki (c) vs. Billy Robinson in a Best 2-out-of-3 Falls match for the NWF World Heavyweight Championship with special witnesses Lou Thesz and Karl Gotch
8.	AJPW	Open Tag League (Day 13); December 15, 1977	Tokyo, Japan	Kuramae Kokugikan	12,000	The Funk Brothers (Terry Funk and Dory Funk Jr.) vs. Abdullah the Butcher and The Sheik in an Open Tag League tournament match
8.	NJPW	New Year Golden Series (Day 29); February 8, 1978	Tokyo, Japan	Nippon Budokan	12,000	Antonio Inoki vs. Umanosuke Ueda in a Nail Floor Death match
9.	NJPW	MSG Series (Day 35); June 1, 1978	Tokyo, Japan	Nippon Budokan	11,000	Antonio Inoki (c-NJPW) defeated Bob Backlund (c-WWWF) in a Champion vs. Champion Best 2-out-of-3 Falls match for the NWF World Heavyweight Championship and WWWF World Heavyweight Championship
10.	NJPW	Golden Fight Series (Day 24); June 26, 1975	Tokyo, Japan	Ryogoku Kokugikan	10,600	Antonio Inoki (c) vs. Tiger Jeet Singh in a Best 2-out-of-3 Falls match for the NWF World Heavyweight Championship

Top 10 most-attended shows in the 1980s
No.	Promotion	Event	Location	Venue	Attendance	Main Event(s)
1.	UWF	U-Cosmos; November 29, 1989	Tokyo, Japan	Tokyo Dome	60,000	Akira Maeda vs. Willie Wilhelm in a "Wrestler vs. Judoka" match
2.	NJPW	Super Powers Clash; April 24, 1989	Tokyo, Japan	Tokyo Dome	53,600	Antonio Inoki vs. Shota Chochishvili
3.	UWF	May History 1st May 4, 1989	Osaka, Japan	Osaka Baseball Stadium	23,000	Akira Maeda vs. Chris Dolman in a Wrestler vs. Kickboxer match
4.	UWF	Midsummer Creation; August 13, 1989	Yokohama, Japan	Yokohama Arena	17,000	Akira Maeda vs. Yoshiaki Fujiwara
5.	AJPW	Super Power Series (Day 19); June 5, 1989	Tokyo, Japan	Nippon Budokan	15,200	Jumbo Tsuruta (c) vs. Gen'ichiro Tenryu for the Triple Crown Heavyweight Championship
6.	UWF	Dynamism; January 10, 1989	Tokyo, Japan	Nippon Budokan	15,000	Akira Maeda vs. Nobuhiko Takada
7.	AJPW	Real World Tag League (Day 18); December 6, 1989	Tokyo, Japan	Nippon Budokan	14,800	Gen'ichiro Tenryu and Stan Hansen vs. Yoshiaki Yatsu and Jumbo Tsuruta in the Real World Tag League tournament final for the vacant AJPW World Tag Team Championship
8.	AJPW	Excite Series (Day 11); March 8, 1989	Tokyo, Japan	Nippon Budokan	14,400	Gen'ichiro Tenryu and The Road Warriors (Road Warrior Hawk and Road Warrior Animal) vs. Jumbo Tsuruta, Yoshiaki Yatsu and Shunji Takano
9.	AJPW	Bruiser Brody Memorial Show; August 29, 1988	Tokyo, Japan	Nippon Budokan	14,200	Jumbo Tsuruta and Yoshiaki Yatsu (c) vs. Gen'ichiro Tenryu and Ashura Hara for the World Tag Team Championship
10.	NJPW	Inoki Toukon Live II; March 26, 1987	Osaka, Japan	Castle Hall	13,850	Antonio Inoki vs. Masa Saito

Top 10 most-attended shows in the 1990s
No.	Promotion	Event	Location	Venue	Attendance	Main Event(s)
1.	NJPW	Antonio Inoki Retirement Show; April 4, 1998	Tokyo, Japan	Tokyo Dome	70,000	Antonio Inoki vs. Don Frye
2.	NJPW / UWFi	NJPW vs. UWFi; October 9, 1995	Tokyo, Japan	Tokyo Dome	67,000	Keiji Muto (NJPW) vs. Nobuhiko Takada (UWFI) in a Champion vs. Champion match for the IWGP Heavyweight Championship and UWFI Heavyweight Championship
3.
3.	AJPW	Giant Baba Memorial Show; May 2, 1999	Tokyo, Japan	Tokyo Dome	65,000	Vader vs. Mitsuharu Misawa for the Triple Crown Heavyweight Championship
3.	NJPW	Battle Formation; April 29, 1996	Tokyo, Japan	Tokyo Dome	65,000	Nobuhiko Takada (c) vs. Shinya Hashimoto for the IWGP Heavyweight Championship
3.	TPW	Tokyo Pro Wrestling in Atami; July 23, 1996	Atami, Japan	Sun Beach	65,000	Abdullah the Butcher and Daikokubo Benkei vs. Kishin Kawabata and Takashi Ishikawa
4.	NJPW / WCW	Starrcade in Tokyo Dome; March 21, 1991	Tokyo, Japan	Tokyo Dome	64,500	Tatsumi Fujinami (c - NJPW) vs. Ric Flair (c - NWA) in a Champion vs. Champion match for the IWGP Heavyweight Championship and NWA World Heavyweight Championships
5.	NJPW / UWFi	Wrestling World 1996; January 4, 1996	Tokyo, Japan	Tokyo Dome	64,000	Keiji Mutoh (c - NJPW) vs. Nobuhiko Takada (UWFi) for the IWGP Heavyweight Championship
6.	NJPW	Super Fight in Tokyo Dome; February 10, 1990	Tokyo, Japan	Tokyo Dome	63,900	Antonio Inoki and Seiji Sakaguchi vs. Masahiro Chono and Shinya Hashimoto with special referee Lou Thesz
7.	NJPW	Fantastic Story in Tokyo Dome; January 4, 1993	Tokyo, Japan	Tokyo Dome	63,500	Genichiro Tenryu vs. Riki Choshu
7.	NJPW	Strong Style Symphony: New Japan Spirit; April 10, 1999	Tokyo, Japan	Tokyo Dome	63,500	Keiji Muto (c) vs. Don Frye for the IWGP Heavyweight Championship
8.	NJPW	Battle 7 January 4, 1995	Tokyo, Japan	Tokyo Dome	62,500	Shinya Hashimoto (c) vs. Kensuke Sasaki for the IWGP Heavyweight Championship
8.	NJPW	Wrestling World 1997; January 4, 1997	Tokyo, Japan	Tokyo Dome	62,500	Shinya Hashimoto (c) vs. Riki Choshu for the IWGP Heavyweight Championship
8.	NJPW	Wrestling World 1999; January 4, 1999	Tokyo, Japan	Tokyo Dome	62,500	Scott Norton (c) vs. Keiji Mutoh for the IWGP Heavyweight Championship
9.	NJPW	Battlefield; January 4, 1994	Tokyo, Japan	Tokyo Dome	62,000	Antonio Inoki vs. Genichiro Tenryu
10.	AJPW	AJPW 25th Anniversary Show; May 1, 1998	Tokyo, Japan	Tokyo Dome	58,300	Mitsuharu Misawa (c) vs. Toshiaki Kawada for the Triple Crown Heavyweight Championship

Top 10 most-attended shows in the 2000s
No.	Promotion	Event	Location	Venue	Attendance	Main Event(s)
1.	NJPW	Do Judge!! October 9, 2000	Tokyo, Japan	Tokyo Dome	64,000	Toshiaki Kawada vs. Kensuke Sasaki
2.	NJPW	Wrestling World 2000; January 4, 2000	Tokyo, Japan	Tokyo Dome	63,500	Genichiro Tenryu (c) vs. Kensuke Sasaki for the IWGP Heavyweight Championship
3.	NJPW	Wrestling World 2001; January 4, 2001	Tokyo, Japan	Tokyo Dome	62,000	Kensuke Sasaki vs. Toshiaki Kawada in a tournament final for the IWGP Heavyweight Championship
3.	NOAH	Destiny; July 18, 2005	Tokyo, Japan	Tokyo Dome	62,000	Toshiaki Kawada vs. Mitsuharu Misawa
4.	NJPW	Indicate of Next; October 8, 2001	Tokyo, Japan	Tokyo Dome	61,500	Jun Akiyama and Yuji Nagata vs. BATT (Hiroshi Hase and Keiji Muto)
5.	NJPW	Dome Impact; April 7, 2000	Tokyo, Japan	Tokyo Dome	60,000	Shinya Hashimoto vs. Naoya Ogawa
6.	AJPW	King's Road New Century 2001; January 28, 2001	Tokyo, Japan	Tokyo Dome	58,700	"Dr. Death" Steve Williams vs. Mike Barton in a revenge match (televised main event on the pay-per-view's initial live broadcast, promoted on TV) Toshiaki Kawada and Kensuke Sasaki vs. Genichiro Tenryu and Hiroshi Hase (dark match main event)
7.	NOAH	Departure; July 10, 2004	Tokyo, Japan	Tokyo Dome	58,000	Kenta Kobashi (c) vs. Jun Akiyama for the GHC Heavyweight Championship
8.	NJPW	Fighting Spirit Memorial Day; May 2, 2002	Tokyo, Japan	Tokyo Dome	57,500	Masahiro Chono vs. Mitsuharu Misawa
9.	NJPW	Ultimate Crush; May 2, 2003	Tokyo, Japan	Tokyo Dome	55,000	Yuji Nagata (c-NJPW) vs. Yoshihiro Takayama (c-NWF) in a Champion vs. Champion match for the IWGP Heavyweight Championship and NWF Heavyweight Championship
10.	NJPW	Wrestling World 2004; January 4, 2004	Tokyo, Japan	Tokyo Dome	53,000	Shinsuke Nakamura (c-NJPW) defeated Yoshihiro Takayama (c-NWF) in a unification match for the IWGP Heavyweight Championship and the NWF Heavyweight Championship

Top 10 most-attended shows in the 2010s
No.	Promotion	Event	Location	Venue	Attendance	Main Event(s)
1.	NJPW	Wrestle Kingdom VI; January 4, 2012	Tokyo, Japan	Tokyo Dome	43,000	Hiroshi Tanahashi (c) vs. Minoru Suzuki for the IWGP Heavyweight Championship
2.	NJPW	Wrestle Kingdom V January 4, 2011	Tokyo, Japan	Tokyo Dome	42,000	Satoshi Kojima (c) vs. Hiroshi Tanahashi for the IWGP Heavyweight Championship
3.	NJPW	Wrestle Kingdom IV; January 4, 2010	Tokyo, Japan	Tokyo Dome	41,500	Shinsuke Nakamura (c) vs. Yoshihiro Takayama for the IWGP Heavyweight Championship
4.	NJPW	Wrestle Kingdom 13; January 4, 2019	Tokyo, Japan	Tokyo Dome	38,162	Kenny Omega (c) vs. Hiroshi Tanahashi for the IWGP Heavyweight Championship
5.	NJPW	Wrestle Kingdom 9 January 4, 2015	Tokyo, Japan	Tokyo Dome	36,000	Hiroshi Tanahashi (c) vs. Kazuchika Okada for the IWGP Heavyweight Championship
6.	NJPW	Wrestle Kingdom 8 January 4, 2014	Tokyo, Japan	Tokyo Dome	35,000	Shinsuke Nakamura (c) vs. Hiroshi Tanahashi for the IWGP Intercontinental Championship
7.	NJPW	Wrestle Kingdom 12; January 4, 2018	Tokyo, Japan	Tokyo Dome	34,995	Kazuchika Okada (c) vs. Tetsuya Naito for the IWGP Heavyweight Championship
8.	DDT	Tokyo Ramen Show Street Wrestling; October 30, 2014	Tokyo, Japan	Komazawa Olympic Park	30,000	Kudo and Gota Ihashi vs. Choun Shiryu and Cao Zhang vs. Sanshiro Takagi and Jun Kasai vs. Golden Storm Riders (Kota Ibushi and Daisuke Sasaki) in a Four-Way match
9.	NJPW	Wrestle Kingdom 7 January 4, 2013	Tokyo, Japan	Tokyo Dome	29,000	Hiroshi Tanahashi (c) vs. Kazuchika Okada for the IWGP Heavyweight Championship
10.	NJPW	Wrestle Kingdom 11; January 4, 2017	Tokyo, Japan	Tokyo Dome	26,192	Kazuchika Okada (c) vs. Kenny Omega for the IWGP Heavyweight Championship

== See also ==
- List of professional wrestling attendance records
- List of professional wrestling attendance records in Europe
- List of professional wrestling attendance records in Puerto Rico
- List of professional wrestling attendance records in the United Kingdom
- List of WWE attendance records
- List of professional wrestling attendance records in Oceania
