= 2000 All Japan Pro Wrestling mass exodus =

Incident in Japanese All Japan Pro Wrestling

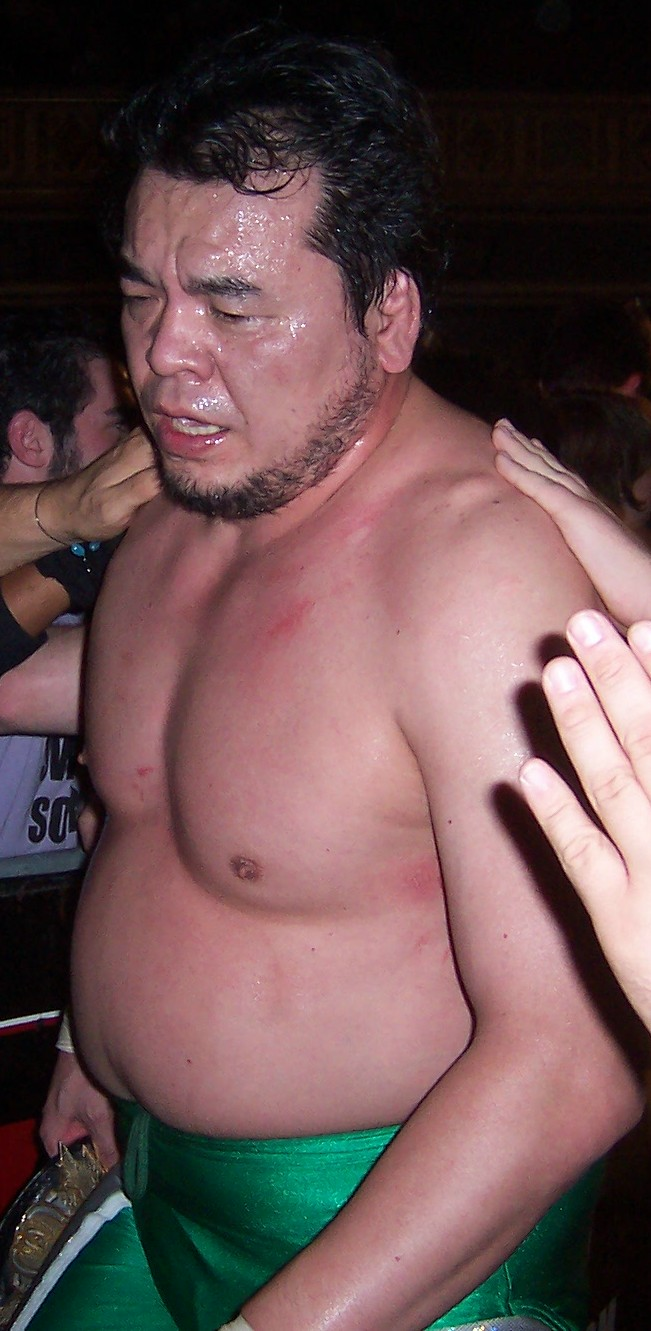
Mitsuharu Misawa, leader of the exodus

The 2000 All Japan Pro Wrestling mass exodus was an incident in the Japanese All Japan Pro Wrestling (AJPW) professional wrestling promotion that took place throughout May and June 2000, and culminated in 24 of the 26 contracted native wrestlers leaving the promotion (Masanobu Fuchi and Toshiaki Kawada remained). Led by Mitsuharu Misawa, they later formed their own promotion, Pro Wrestling Noah.

== Background ==
=== History ===
All Japan Pro Wrestling (AJPW) was founded in 1972 by Shohei "Giant" Baba, Mitsuo Momota, and Yoshihiro Momota; the three were a student and the two sons of Rikidōzan, the godfather of Japanese professional wrestling a.k.a. Puroresu. Baba served as the promotion's president, head booker, talent scout, and head trainer for much of his lifetime. Under Baba, the promotion enjoyed much success and reached new heights in the 1990s thanks mostly to the performances of Mitsuharu Misawa, Toshiaki Kawada, Kenta Kobashi, and Akira Taue--dubbed "The Four Pillars Of Heaven" by magazines and reporters. Baba continued to run the promotion until late 1998 when his health deteriorated and he was hospitalized in January 1999.

=== Build-up ===
Baba died from liver failure (a complication of colon cancer) on January 31, 1999, at the age of 61. In the wake of his death, widow and majority shareholder Motoko Baba intended for Mitsuo Momota to inherit the presidential position, but board member Jumbo Tsuruta used his influence to help Misawa inherit the position, before Tsuruta himself was forced out of the company (with no severance package). Misawa was trained for the position during the following months, and was officially announced as AJPW president during a press conference on May 7.

Disagreements with Motoko Baba arose even before the transition was made public, as reports of a "quiet" power struggle saw print in March 1999, and Tsuruta confirmed these when he left Japan for Portland, Oregon. In fact, the two had had professional tensions long beforehand. Motoko had opposed the decision to push Misawa in the wake of Genichiro Tenryu's departure in 1990, and the two began conflicting as early as 1996; in the year before Shohei Baba's death, Misawa even asked him on behalf of the locker room to have his wife leave the company, and was somewhat successful in that she ceased to have any creative influence when Misawa began booking. Misawa attempted to keep Baba content by maintaining the same salary that she had been paid when her husband was alive (approximately $500,000), but this did not change the power dynamic. Misawa's wish to change the AJPW product, and to modernize its presentation, to address their box office troubles ran in direct opposition to Baba's intent to maintain her late husband's booking philosophy. Misawa was particularly intent on pushing the company's younger talent, and in September 1999 he and Baba had a major fight over a match between Jun Akiyama and Takao Omori being the main event of a Budokan show (which sold out), although this match's placement had been decided by a fan ballot. Motoko's conservatism was partially due to her belief that the company, and Japanese wrestling as a whole, had fallen from its peak. Misawa was also angry with Motoko over fiscal matters, as he had discovered that much of the company's merchandise sales did not produce funds for AJPW, but for a subsidiary that she had set up. At some point, Misawa approached Nippon TV with his plans to leave AJPW to start a new promotion, and told them that nearly everyone in the locker room would follow him. NTV officials told Misawa that they supported him, but that they needed to keep their agreement quiet for the time being as, due to the proximity of Baba's death, the station wanted to wait until enough time had passed to drop All Japan's television program, which had been associated closely with NTV since its formation. Nevertheless, rumors that NTV had taken Misawa's side in his dispute against Baba saw print in February 2000, and Weekly Fight Magazine reported that AJPW would split into two groups in May, though Misawa declined to comment on this.

Adding to the situation was that, as of the end of the fiscal year on March 31, 2000, all the promotion's talent were working as free agents, since Misawa was not authorized to give the raises he intended to award all native workers; Misawa had also wanted to modernize their contracts, providing wrestlers with full medical coverage, full injury pay, and possibly stock options (which NJPW's contracts offered). As the result of these disagreements, the AJPW executive board voted to remove Misawa from the presidential position on May 28. All parties agreed to keep this news private until the end of the current tour, and Misawa attempted to persuade Baba to give him her public blessings to start a new company, so as to smooth the public transition and preserve the legacies of Giant Baba and the recently deceased Tsuruta. Baba refused this proposal or relinquishment of any of her majority share, and Tokyo Sports broke the news on June 12. At an emergency board meeting held in response on June 13, co-vice president Mitsuo Momota and fellow boardsmen Kobashi, Taue, Kenichi Oyagi, and Yoshihiro Momota collectively resigned from their positions.

== Incident ==
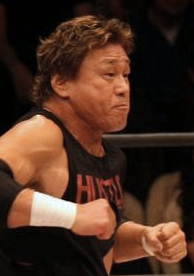
Genichiro Tenryu made his return to AJPW in 2000 after leaving the promotion in 1990

On June 16, 2000, a press conference was led by Mitsuharu Misawa, where 24 of the 26 native wrestlers contracted to All Japan Pro Wrestling joined him. With over 100 reporters and news outlets in attendance, Misawa announced that everyone surrounding him would be leaving All Japan Pro Wrestling after finishing their last committed appearances in July, and that they would be forming a new promotion together. A day later, Misawa announced the promotion's name: Pro Wrestling Noah. On June 19, 2000, it was confirmed at a press conference in the All Japan dojo held by Toshiaki Kawada and Masanobu Fuchi that NTV had agreed to discontinue broadcasting All Japan Pro Wrestling after 27 years with the network. NTV also announced that they would carry weekly tapings of Misawa's new Noah promotion, with the title of the program being called "Colosseo", in the place of All Japan's former 30-minute timeslot on Sundays at midnight. On June 20, Misawa met with Nippon TV officials, who had cancelled All Japan's television program, and secured a time slot for Noah programming.

On July 2 at Korakuen Hall, Motoko Baba came out to the ring and announced the return of Genichiro Tenryu to All Japan. This was previously unfathomable as Giant Baba had sworn to banish him from ever competing in the promotion again after Tenryu led his own exodus from AJPW in 1990 to form the Super World of Sports (SWS) promotion. Baba announced he would team with Toshiaki Kawada to face Maunakea Mossman and Stan Hansen on July 23 on the final show of the Super Action Series Tour in Nippon Budokan. On July 20, 2000, Yoshinobu Kanemaru, Takeshi Morishima, Naomichi Marufuji, Kentaro Shiga, Takeshi Rikio, Mitsuo Momota, Rusher Kimura, Haruka Eigen, Tsuyoshi Kikuchi, Kenta Kobayashi, Takao Omori, Yoshihiro Takayama, Jun Izumida, Masao Inoue, Yoshinari Ogawa, Akira Taue, Jun Akiyama and Mitsuharu Misawa competed in their last matches for All Japan Pro Wrestling at the sold-out Hakata Star Lane in Fukuoka. During the show, "Dr. Death" Steve Williams came out and shook Misawa's hand, and requested one last singles match between the two. However, Misawa returned to the bus immediately after his match, not staying for the last two matches of the show and the match never happened. Every single one of All Japan's titles were vacated due to the departure of the aforementioned wrestlers and title holders. Mrs. Baba later appointed Stan Hansen as the new Chairman of All Japan's Pacific Wrestling Federation title governing body, replacing Lord James Blears.

== Aftermath ==
Although a mass exodus in Japanese pro wrestling was not unheard of, an exodus of this size was unprecedented at the time, rivalled only by Tenryu's exodus to form SWS in 1990. The event caused a shockwave throughout Japanese sports tabloids, and newfound attention was bought to Misawa and his new promotion. The two promotions would eventually begin working together in 2004, with Keiji Mutoh and Taiyo Kea facing Misawa and Yoshinari Ogawa at Departure 2004 in the Tokyo Dome, and Misawa returning to All Japan twice in 2004.

=== All Japan Pro Wrestling ===
After the new Noah roster wrestled their last matches for the promotion, All Japan began the process of rebuilding itself, relying on freelance talent and cross promotional matches to fill its cards. On August 11, 2000, Masanobu Fuchi appeared at the New Japan Pro-Wrestling (NJPW) G1 Climax show in Ryogoku Kokugikan. Standing in a New Japan ring for the first time in his career, Fuchi announced his intention to "break down the walls" between All Japan and New Japan, and he was soon joined in the ring by NJPW foreman Riki Choshu. The two exchanged a handshake in the ring, and thus a cross promotional relationship began between All Japan Pro Wrestling and New Japan Pro Wrestling. The first major cross promotional matches between NJPW and AJPW took place on October 9, 2000 at NJPW Do Judge!! in the Tokyo Dome. Fuchi, Dr. Death Steve Williams and Toshiaki Kawada all represented AJPW on the card, with Kawada shockingly defeating IWGP Heavyweight Champion Kensuke Sasaki in a non-title match in the main event. This led to Sasaki, in kayfabe, becoming so disgusted with himself for losing to an outsider that he vacated the championship. The two promotions continued to work together, with Fuchi and Kawada regularly appearing in NJPW throughout late 2000. All Japan returned to the Tokyo Dome for the first time since the exodus on January 28, 2001, with appearances from Keiji Mutoh and Jushin Thunder Liger, as well as a main event featuring Kensuke Sasaki teaming up with Toshiaki Kawada to defeat Genichiro Tenryu and Hiroshi Hase.

=== Pro Wrestling Noah ===
Pro Wrestling Noah debuted on August 5, 2000 in Differ Ariake, main evented by a 2 out of 3 falls match putting Kenta Kobashi and Jun Akiyama against Mitsuharu Misawa and Akira Taue, won by Akiyama and Kobashi. Misawa later established the promotion's championships as the Global Honored Crown, and a tournament was held for the GHC Heavyweight Championship in 2001, where Misawa defeated Yoshihiro Takayama in the final to become the inaugural champion. Interest in the fledgling promotion was high, and Misawa used this to push younger talent over himself, with Jun Akiyama winning the title in July 2001. Despite the positive reception to Akiyama's reign, head booker Misawa grew anxious that a lack of legitimate title contenders would damage both the title and Akiyama's reputation early in the promotion's life, and in April 2002 Akiyama dropped the championship to Yoshinari Ogawa as a stepping stone to get the championship back to Misawa.

== Bibliography ==
- Charlton, Chris (July 17, 2018). EGGSHELLS: Pro Wrestling in the Tokyo Dome (Kindle ed.). ISBN 9784990865856.
- Misawa, Mitsuharu (2000). Misawa Mitsuharu Autobiography (in Japanese). Kobunsha. ISBN 4334972756.
- Nakata, Ryu; Honda, Makoto (2007). NOAHを創った男_三沢光晴の参謀 (in Japanese). BASEBALL MAGAZINE SHA Co., Ltd. ISBN 458310040X.
