= Departure (2004) =

2004 Pro Wrestling NOAH event

- Promotion: Pro Wrestling NOAH
- Date: July 10, 2004
- City: Tokyo, Japan
- Venue: Tokyo Dome
- Attendance: 58,000

Departure was a major professional wrestling event produced by Pro Wrestling Noah. The event took place on July 10, 2004 at the Tokyo Dome in Tokyo, Japan, and marked Noah's first ever show in the arena.

The main event was marketed as the culmination of the long running feud between former allies and tag team partners Kenta Kobashi and Jun Akiyama for the GHC Heavyweight Championship, then held by Kobashi. Beginning on Noah's very first show in 2000 and having spanned over four years since then, it marked the first time Akiyama and Kobashi had faced off in singles competition since December 23rd 2000, where Kenta Kobashi defeated Jun Akiyama, avenging his loss against Akiyama from August 6th 2000. Which made this match the 3rd meeting between the two in Noah, and made this match a tiebreaker of sorts.

In other major matches on the event, All Japan Pro Wrestling's Keiji Mutoh and Taiyo Kea made their first ever appearances in the promotion, facing former AJPW wrestlers Mitsuharu Misawa and Yoshinari Ogawa. This marked the first ever co-operative match between All Japan and Noah since Misawa had left AJPW to form the latter four years earlier. Yoshinobu Kanemaru also defended the GHC Junior Heavyweight Championship against Jushin Thunder Liger. The show also featured participation from New Japan Pro-Wrestling (NJPW), with IWGP Tag Team Champions Minoru Suzuki and Yoshihiro Takayama defending the titles against Takeshi Rikio and Takeshi Morishima.

== Background ==
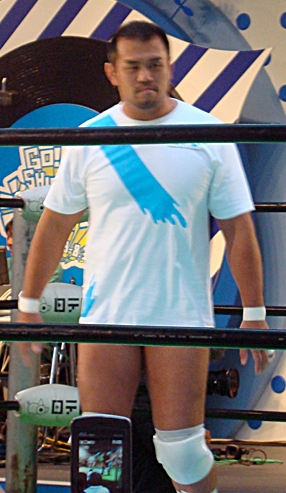
Jun Akiyama challenged for the GHC Heavyweight Championship in the main event.

At Noah's first ever show in 2000, Jun Akiyama turned heel for the first time in his career after he and Kenta Kobashi had defeated Mitsuharu Misawa and Akira Taue in the two out of three falls main event, with Akiyama winning both falls. The following night, Akiyama and Kobashi faced off in the main event, with Akiyama winning by referee stoppage after Kobashi legitimately passed out. This marked the first time Akiyama had defeated Kobashi in his career, and helped elevate Akiyama as one of NOAH's top stars in the formative years of the promotion. Due to large amounts of injuries piling up, Kobashi needed time off and was absent from Noah for much of 2001. While this was happening, Akiyama defeated Misawa on July 27, 2001, to win the GHC Heavyweight Championship. Akiyama successfully defended the championship against Tamon Honda and Vader, and defeated Yuji Nagata to retain the title in the main event of New Japan Pro-Wrestling's Wrestling World 2002. Despite the positive reception to Akiyama's reign, head booker Mitsuharu Misawa grew anxious that a lack of legitimate title contenders would damage both the title and Akiyama's reputation early in the promotion's life, and in April 2002 Akiyama dropped the championship to Yoshinari Ogawa as a stepping stone to get the championship back to Misawa. Shortly after, Akiyama primarily became a tag team wrestler, teaming with Akitoshi Saito to win the GHC Tag Team Championship in September. While Akiyama focused on tag team competition, Kobashi had returned and was set to become the top star of Noah, becoming number one contender for the GHC Heavyweight Championship in late 2002. On March 1, 2003, Kobashi defeated Misawa to win the GHC Heavyweight Championship and embarked on the longest reign in the championship's history, holding the title for over a year leading into Departure.

== Results ==
No.	Results	Stipulations	Times
1	Mitsuo Momota defeated Haruka Eigen	Singles match	8:03
2	Jun Izumida, Tamon Honda and Tsuyoshi Kikuchi defeated Masao Inoue, Kishin Kawabata and Masashi Aoyagi	Six man tag team match	10:58
3	Team Kaos (Donovan Morgan and Michael Modest) defeated Kotaro Suzuki and Ricky Marvin	Tag team match	11:55
4	Kaos (Richard Slinger and Scorpio) defeated Akitoshi Saito and Makoto Hashi	Tag team match	16:44
5	Akira Taue and Takuma Sano defeated Daisuke Ikeda and Muhammad Yone	Tag team match	10:45
6	Kenta and Naomichi Marufuji (c) defeated Kendo Kashin and Takashi Sugiura	Tag team match for the GHC Junior Heavyweight Tag Team Championship	22:26
7	Yoshinobu Kanemaru defeated Jushin Thunder Liger (c)	Singles match for the GHC Junior Heavyweight Championship	17:39
8	Minoru Suzuki and Yoshihiro Takayama (c) defeated Wild II (Takeshi Rikio and Takeshi Morishima)	Tag team match for the IWGP Tag Team Championship	12:55
9	Mitsuharu Misawa and Yoshinari Ogawa (c) defeated Keiji Mutoh and Taiyo Kea	Tag team match for the GHC Tag Team Championship	21:46
10	Kenta Kobashi (c) defeated Jun Akiyama	Singles match for the GHC Heavyweight Championship	35:34
(c) / – the champion(s) heading into the match

== Aftermath ==
Kenta Kobashi would continue to hold the GHC Heavyweight Championship well into 2005, eventually losing it to Takeshi Rikio in March 2005, setting the record for longest ever reign with the championship at 735 days.

Misawa would compete in AJPW for the first time in 4 years 8 days after this event, defeating Satoshi Kojima at Battle Banquet.

== See also ==
- Pro Wrestling Noah
