= Wrestling World 2002 =

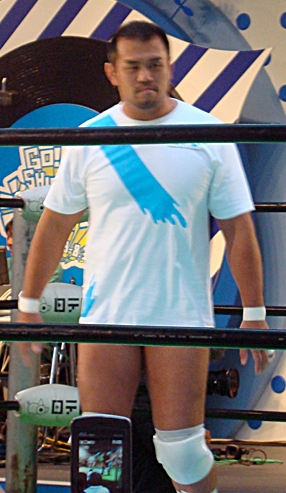
- Jun Akiyama, who successfully defended the GHC Heavyweight Championship at the event.
- Promotion: New Japan Pro-Wrestling
- Date: January 4, 2002
- City: Tokyo, Japan
- Venue: Tokyo Dome
- Attendance: 52,000

Wrestling World chronology
← Previous; 2001	Next → 2003

New Japan Pro-Wrestling events chronology
← Previous; Wrestling Dontaku 2001	Next → Wrestling World 2003

Wrestling World 2002 was a professional wrestling event produced by New Japan Pro-Wrestling (NJPW). It took place on January 4 in the Tokyo Dome. Wrestling World 2002 was the eleventh January 4 Tokyo Dome Show held by NJPW. The show drew 52,000 spectators.

The show was the first January 4 Tokyo Dome Show to feature wrestlers from Pro Wrestling Noah, with the main event of the ten match show being a successful defense of the GHC Heavyweight Championship as champion Jun Akiyama defeated NJPW representative Yuji Nagata. The show also featured a successful IWGP Junior Heavyweight Championship defense by Kendo Kashin.

== Production ==
=== Background ===
The January 4 Tokyo Dome Show is NJPW's biggest annual event and has been called "the largest professional wrestling show in the world outside of the United States" and the "Japanese equivalent to the Super Bowl".

== Results ==
No.	Results	Stipulations	Times
1	Masahito Kakihara and Masayuki Naruse defeated Katsuyori Shibata and Wataru Inoue	Tag team match	10:50
2	El Samurai and Minoru Tanaka defeated Akira and Koji Kanemoto	Tag team match	12:31
3	Kazunari Murakami and Yuki Ishikawa defeated Hiroshi Tanahashi and Kenzo Suzuki	Tag team match	08:00
4	The Great Sasuke, Jushin Thunder Liger and Tiger Mask defeated Dick Togo, Gedo and Jado	Six-man tag team match	20:12
5	Manabu Nakanishi defeated Giant Silva via countout	Singles match	06:49
6	Kendo Kashin (c) defeated Daijiro Matsui	Singles match for the IWGP Junior Heavyweight Championship	05:43
7	Hiroshi Hase and Keiji Mutoh defeated Osamu Nishimura and Tatsumi Fujinami	Tag team match	16:44
8	Naoya Ogawa vs. Kensuke Sasaki ended in a no contest	Singles match	04:02
9	Tencozy (Hiroyoshi Tenzan and Satoshi Kojima) defeated Giant Singh and Masahiro Chono	Tag team match	10:47
10	Jun Akiyama (c) defeated Yuji Nagata	Singles match for the GHC Heavyweight Championship	19:58
(c) / – the champion(s) heading into the match
