= NJPW Do Judge!! =

2000 New Japan Pro-Wrestling event

Do Judge!!
- Promotional poster featuring Masahiro Chono
- Promotion: New Japan Pro-Wrestling
- Date: October 9, 2000
- City: Tokyo, Japan
- Venue: Tokyo Dome
- Attendance: 64,000

Pay-per-view chronology
| ← Previous; Wrestling Dontaku 2000 | Next → Wrestling World 2001 |

Do Judge!! was a major professional wrestling television special event produced by New Japan Pro-Wrestling (NJPW). The event took place on October 9, 2000, at the Tokyo Dome in Tokyo, Japan. It marked the first major cross promotional matches between New Japan Pro-Wrestling and All Japan Pro Wrestling (AJPW) after the two had entered into a working relationship in August.

The main event was marketed as a "dream match", putting Toshiaki Kawada, the top star of AJPW, up against Kensuke Sasaki, then-reigning IWGP Heavyweight Champion and winner of that year's G1 Climax. Despite Sasaki being champion at the time, the title was not on the line. Other talent representing AJPW on the show included Masanobu Fuchi and "Dr Death" Steve Williams.

In other major matches on the event, Team 2000 (Satoshi Kojima and Hiroyoshi Tenzan) defended the IWGP Tag Team Championship against Fighting Club G-Eggs (Manabu Nakanishi and Yuji Nagata), and Koji Kanemoto challenged Tatsuhito Takaiwa for the IWGP Junior Heavyweight Championship. Shinya Hashimoto also returned to face Tatsumi Fujinami, in his last match as a contracted NJPW performer.

== Production ==
=== Background ===
After the 2000 All Japan Pro Wrestling mass exodus, AJPW was left with a severely depleted roster, and relied on freelancers and talent from other promotions to fill their cards. In August 2000 at the G1 Climax finals, All Japan mainstay Masanobu Fuchi appeared in a New Japan Pro-Wrestling (NJPW) ring for the first time ever, and announced his intentions to "break down the walls" between AJPW and NJPW, 2 companies who had only worked together a handful of times prior. Shortly after, Fuchi was joined in the ring by NJPW foreman Riki Choshu, and the two exchanged a firm handshake in ring, signalling the start of a working relationship between the two companies. The first cross promotional match of the new relationship took place in September 2000's Amazing tour, with All Japan representatives Fuchi and Taiyo Kea defeating NJPW's Masahiro Chono and Tatsutoshi Goto. Shortly after this, it was announced that the main event of the upcoming Tokyo Dome show would be All Japan's Toshiaki Kawada facing New Japan's IWGP Heavyweight Champion Kensuke Sasaki in a non-title match. Though this was marketed as a "dream match", it was not the first time they had faced off - Kawada defeated Sasaki twice in AJPW in 1987.

After losing a match to longtime rival Naoya Ogawa in which he stipulated he would retire from pro wrestling if he did so, Shinya Hashimoto was absent from New Japan Pro-Wrestling for months afterwards. A special one-off return match was announced for this show, where Hashimoto would face Tatsumi Fujinami.

=== Storylines ===
Do Judge!! featured professional wrestling matches that involved different wrestlers from pre-existing scripted feuds and storylines. Wrestlers portrayed villains, heroes, or less distinguishable characters in scripted events that built tension and culminated in a wrestling match or series of matches.

== Aftermath ==
Despite the title not being on the line, Kensuke Sasaki was (in kayfabe) so disgusted with himself for losing to an outsider that he vacated the IWGP Heavyweight Championship shortly after the event. A tournament was later set up for the 2001 January 4 Tokyo Dome Show, featuring Sasaki, Toshiaki Kawada, Satoshi Kojima, Hiroyoshi Tenzan, Yuji Nagata and Masahiro Chono. In the final of the tournament, Sasaki defeated Kawada to win the vacant championship.

After defeating Tatsumi Fujinami, Shinya Hashimoto was officially released by NJPW in November 2000. He soon competed for rival Pro Wrestling Noah, and later formed his own promotion, Pro Wrestling Zero-One.

== Results ==
| No. | Results | Stipulations | Times |
|---|---|---|---|
| 1 | Shinya Hashimoto defeated Tatsumi Fujinami | Singles match | 14:18 |
| 2 | Jushin Thunder Liger defeated Super Delfin | Singles match | 13:44 |
| 3 | Don Frye defeated Takashi Iizuka | Singles match | 10:47 |
| 4 | Tatsuhito Takaiwa (c) defeated Koji Kanemoto | Singles match for the IWGP Junior Heavyweight Championship | 12:51 |
| 5 | Team 2000 (Hiroyoshi Tenzan and Satoshi Kojima) (c) defeated Fighting Club G-Eggs (Manabu Nakanishi and Yuji Nagata) | Tag team match for the IWGP Tag Team Championship | 20:22 |
| 6 | Steve Williams defeated Scott Norton | Singles match | 12:56 |
| 7 | Team 2000 (Masahiro Chono and Tatsutoshi Goto) defeated Masanobu Fuchi and Shiro Koshinaka | Tag team match | 12:28 |
| 8 | Toshiaki Kawada defeated Kensuke Sasaki | Singles match | 19:38 |
(c) / – the champion(s) heading into the match
