= Wrestling World 2003 =

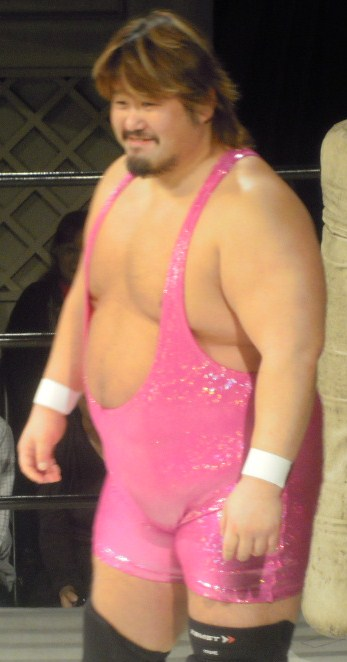
- Yutaka Yoshie, who was defeated by Ryushi Yanagisawa in the Young Generation Cup finals.
- Promotion: New Japan Pro-Wrestling
- Date: January 4, 2003
- City: Tokyo, Japan
- Venue: Tokyo Dome
- Attendance: 30,000

Wrestling World chronology
← Previous; 2002	Next → 2004

New Japan Pro-Wrestling events chronology
← Previous; Wrestling World 2002	Next → Ultimate Crush

Wrestling World 2003 was a professional wrestling television special event held by New Japan Pro-Wrestling (NJPW). The event took place on January 4 in the Tokyo Dome. It was the twelfth January 4 Tokyo Dome Show promoted by NJPW. The show drew 30,000 spectators.

The show featured the semi-finals and the finals of the "Young Generation Cup", an NJPW tournament for relative newcomers who have yet to establish themselves as top level wrestlers, which saw Ryushi Yanagisawa defeat Yutaka Yoshie to win the cup. The show featured a total of eleven matches, including a match for the vacant NWF Heavyweight Championship that Yoshihiro Takayama won by defeating Tsuyoshi Kosaka in the finals of a four-man tournament. The main event was a successful defense of the IWGP Heavyweight Championship as champion Yuji Nagata defeated Josh Barnett.

== Production ==
=== Background ===
The January 4 Tokyo Dome Show is NJPW's biggest annual event and has been called "the largest professional wrestling show in the world outside of the United States" and the "Japanese equivalent to the Super Bowl".

=== Storylines ===
Wrestling World 2003 featured professional wrestling matches that involved different wrestlers from pre-existing scripted feuds and storylines. Wrestlers portrayed villains, heroes, or less distinguishable characters in scripted events that built tension and culminated in a wrestling match or series of matches.

== Results ==
No.	Results	Stipulations	Times
1	Osamu Nishimura defeated Tatsumi Fujinami	Singles match	08:10
2	Yutaka Yoshie defeated Shinya Makabe	Singles match: semifinal of the Young Generation Cup	13:20
3	Ryushi Yanagisawa defeated Kenzo Suzuki	Singles match: semifinal of the Young Generation Cup	09:23
4	Dai Majin and Makai #1 defeated Hiro Saito and Tatsutoshi Goto via disqualification	Tag team match	07:50
5	Makai #4 and Makai #5 defeated Masahito Kakihara and Takashi Iizuka	Tag team match	10:54
6	Jushin Thunder Liger, Koji Kanemoto and Takehiro Murahama defeated Heat, Masayuki Naruse and Tiger Mask	Six-man tag team match	16:10
7	Ryushi Yanagisawa defeated Yutaka Yoshie	Singles match: Finals of the Young Generation Cup	06:48
8	Michiyoshi Ohara and Shinsuke Nakamura defeated Kazunari Murakami and Tadao Yasuda via referee stoppage	Tag team match	07:12
9	Satoshi Kojima and Hiroyoshi Tenzan defeated Masahiro Chono and Manabu Nakanishi	Tag team match	23:18
10	Yoshihiro Takayama defeated Tsuyoshi Kosaka	Singles match; Tournament final for the vacant NWF Heavyweight Championship	10:19
11	Yuji Nagata (c) defeated Josh Barnett	Singles match for the IWGP Heavyweight Championship	10:40
(c) / – the champion(s) heading into the match

=== NWF Heavyweight Championship tournament bracket ===
Semifinals
Cross Road	Yoshihiro Takayama	Pin
08/29/2002	Kazuyuki Fujita	08:28
The Spiral	Tsuyoshi Kosaka	Sub
10/14/2002	Tadao Yasuda	02:15

Finals
Wrestling World	Yoshihiro Takayama	Pin
01/04/2003	Tsuyoshi Kosaka	10:19

=== Young Generation Cup tournament bracket ===
Semifinals
Shinya Makabe	Pin
Yutaka Yoshie	13:20
Kenzo Suzuki	Pin
Ryushi Yanagisawa	09:23

Finals
Yutaka Yoshie	Sub
Ryushi Yanagisawa	06:48
