= Wrestling World 2001 =

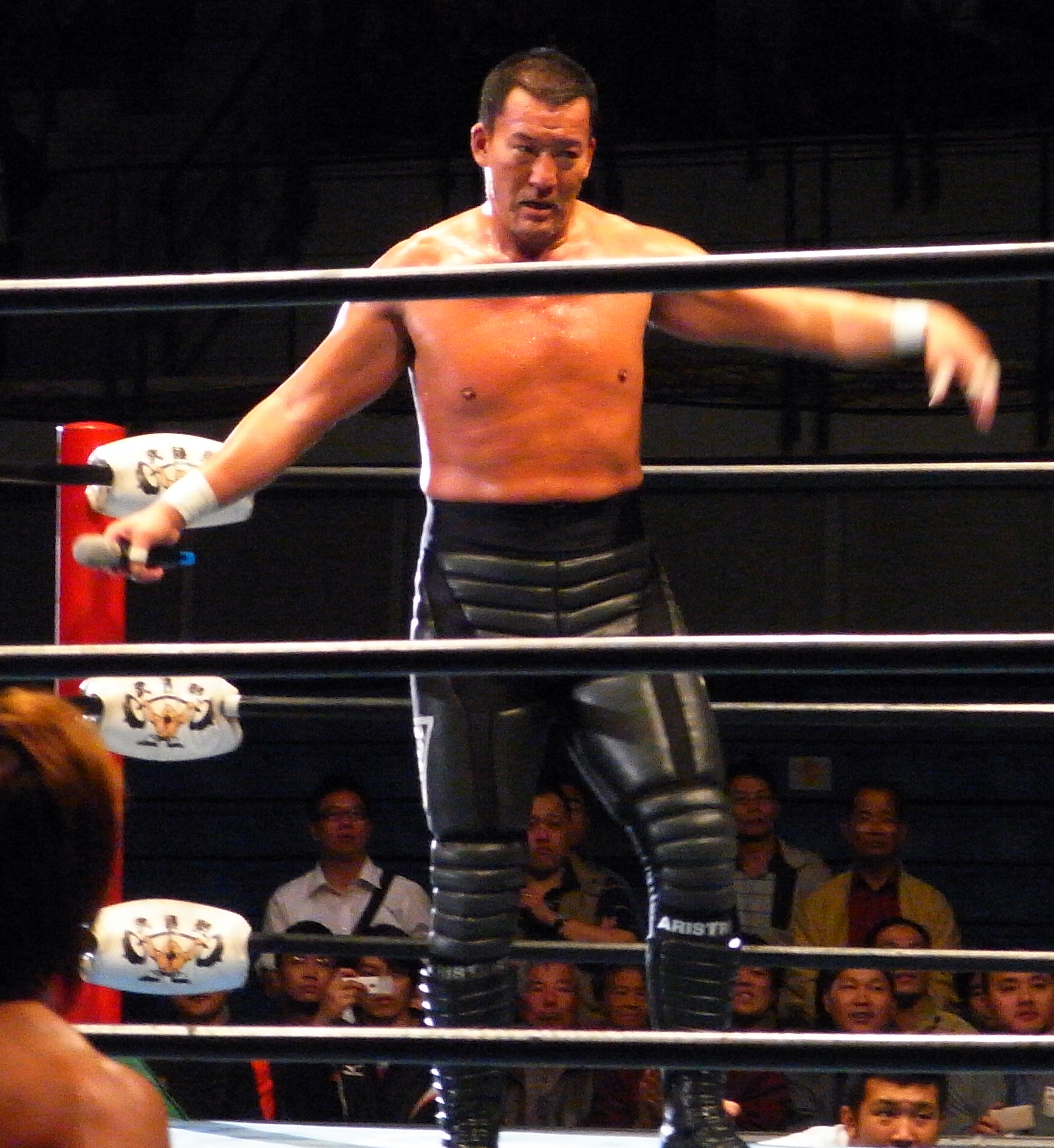
- Masahiro Chono, who made it to the semi-finals of the IWGP Heavyweight Championship tournament.
- Promotion: New Japan Pro-Wrestling
- Date: January 4, 2001
- City: Tokyo, Japan
- Venue: Tokyo Dome
- Attendance: 52,000

Wrestling World chronology
← Previous; 2000	Next → 2002

New Japan Pro-Wrestling events chronology
← Previous; Do Judge!!	Next → Wrestling Dontaku 2001

Wrestling World 2001 was a professional wrestling television special event produced by New Japan Pro-Wrestling (NJPW). It took place on January 4 in the Tokyo Dome. It was the tenth January 4 Tokyo Dome Show held by NJPW. The show drew 52,000 spectators.

The focal point of Wrestling World 2001 was a tournament to crown a new IWGP Heavyweight Champion, which accounted for five of the nine matches on the show. No other championships were defended in 2001, marking the first year that only one title was on the line. The show saw Toshiaki Kawada wrestle twice; Kawada had previously been one of the main event wrestlers of NJPW's biggest rival All Japan Pro Wrestling.

== Production ==
=== Background ===
The January 4 Tokyo Dome Show is NJPW's biggest annual event and has been called "the largest professional wrestling show in the world outside of the United States" and the "Japanese equivalent to the Super Bowl".

=== Storylines ===
Wrestling World 2001 featured professional wrestling matches that involved different wrestlers from pre-existing scripted feuds and storylines. Wrestlers portrayed villains, heroes, or less distinguishable characters in scripted events that built tension and culminated in a wrestling match or series of matches.

== Results ==
No.	Results	Stipulations	Times
1	Kensuke Sasaki defeated Satoshi Kojima	Singles match: IWGP Heavyweight Championship tournament quarter-final	16:33
2	Hiroyoshi Tenzan defeated Yuji Nagata	Singles match: IWGP Heavyweight Championship tournament quarter-final	16:45
3	Koji Kanemoto and Minoru Tanaka defeated Shinya Makabe and Tatsuhito Takaiwa	Tag team match	18:02
4	Takashi Iizuka defeated Kendo Kashin	Singles match	06:12
5	Kensuke Sasaki defeated Masahiro Chono	Singles match: IWGP Heavyweight Championship tournament semi-final	11:28
6	Toshiaki Kawada defeated Hiroyoshi Tenzan	Singles match: IWGP Heavyweight Championship tournament semi-final	10:45
7	Keiji Mutoh and Shinjiro Otani defeated Jushin Thunder Liger and Manabu Nakanishi	Tag team match	05:44
8	Riki Choshu vs. Shinya Hashimoto ended in a no contest	Singles match	15:20
9	Kensuke Sasaki defeated Toshiaki Kawada	Singles match: IWGP Heavyweight Championship tournament final	10:30

=== IWGP Heavyweight Championship tournament bracket ===
Quarterfinals
Satoshi Kojima	Sub
Kensuke Sasaki	16:33
Yuji Nagata	Pin
Hiroyoshi Tenzan	16:45

Semifinals
Kensuke Sasaki	Sub
Masahiro Chono	11:28
Hiroyoshi Tenzan	Pin
Toshiaki Kawada	10:45

Finals
Kensuke Sasaki	Pin
Toshiaki Kawada	10:30
