= January 4 Tokyo Dome Show =

New Japan Pro-Wrestling event series

- Promotion(s): New Japan Pro-Wrestling (1992–present); World Championship Wrestling (1992–1993); Big Japan Pro Wrestling (1997); All Japan Pro Wrestling (2007); All Elite Wrestling (2027)
- First event: 1992

For NJPW Tokyo Dome events on other dates, see Professional wrestling at the Tokyo Dome.

The January 4 Tokyo Dome Show is a professional wrestling event produced annually on January 4 in the Tokyo Dome by New Japan Pro-Wrestling (NJPW), a Japan-based professional wrestling promotion. NJPW has promoted events in the venue every January 4 since Super Warriors in Tokyo Dome in 1992. Since its debut on pay-per-view in 2007, the January 4 show has been branded as Wrestle Kingdom.

The January 4 Tokyo Dome Show became NJPW's premier annual event and the biggest event in Japanese wrestling, similar to what WrestleMania is for WWE and American professional wrestling. It has been described as "the largest professional wrestling show in the world outside of the United States" and the "Japanese equivalent to the Super Bowl". Since 2014, NJPW has scheduled supporting shows on the days before or after January 4, including a second Wrestle Kingdom show in the Tokyo Dome between 2020 and 2023.

NJPW began running events at the Tokyo Dome with Battle Satellite in Tokyo Dome in April 1989. This proved successful enough to repeat each year, with Super Fight in February 1990, the collaborative WWF/AJPW/NJPW Wrestling Summit in April 1990, and the World Championship Wrestling joint venture Starrcade in Tokyo Dome in March 1991. The latter WCW/New Japan Supershow became a brief annual theme, with the second & third such events being the first two to take place on the date of January 4, a tradition that outlasted the WCW partnership and has remained since. All of the Dome shows have featured championship matches, including several titles not owned by NJPW. On three occasions (1998, 2006 and 2013), no titles changed hands during the show. The 2019 show, which featured eight title matches, was the first in which all contested titles changed hands.

Some of the earlier January 4 show attendance numbers have been disputed. Officially, the 1993 Tokyo Dome show set the attendance record with 63,500 fans packing the Tokyo Dome, while according to Dave Meltzer, the 1998 show holds the record with an attendance of 55,000. The lowest attendances for any Dome Shows were for the 2021 event, held under attendance restrictions due to COVID-19; NJPW announced an attendance of 12,689 for the first night and 7,801 for the second. Prior to COVID-19, the 2007 and 2011 Dome shows drew the lowest unofficial gates, with only 18,000 in attendance.

As of 2021, the January 4 shows (including matches held on January 5 as part of two-night events) have hosted 328 matches (not including dark or pre-show matches), 126 of which were title matches leading to 69 title changes in total. (Note: The count of title changes includes one match during Wrestle Kingdom 15 in 2021 in which two titles changed hands. During the first night, Kota Ibushi defeated Tetsuya Naito for both the IWGP Heavyweight Championship and IWGP Intercontinental Championship.) The 2005 Tokyo Dome show had a 16-match card, the largest of any single-night show, while 2001, 2002, 2007, 2013, 2016, 2018 and 2019 featured 9 matches, the lowest number of matches on a single-night show (again, not counting dark or pre-show matches). The first two-night show in 2020 featured a total of 16 matches, tying the 2005 show for the most in a single event, but each night featured only eight matches, fewer than any previous Dome Show card. The second two-night show in 2021, affected by COVID-19, had only 6 matches scheduled for each night.

== Events ==
#	Year	Event	Main Event	Ref
1	1992	Super Warriors in Tokyo Dome	Riki Choshu (Greatest 18) vs. Tatsumi Fujinami (IWGP Heavyweight) for the Greatest 18 Championship and IWGP Heavyweight Championship	
2	1993	Fantastic Story in Tokyo Dome	Genichiro Tenryu vs. Riki Choshu	
3	1994	Battlefield	Antonio Inoki vs. Genichiro Tenryu	
4	1995	Battle 7	Shinya Hashimoto (c) vs. Kensuke Sasaki for the IWGP Heavyweight Championship	
Wrestling World/Final Power Hall
5	1996	Wrestling World 1996	Keiji Mutoh (c) vs. Nobuhiko Takada for the IWGP Heavyweight Championship	
6	1997	Wrestling World 1997	Shinya Hashimoto (c) vs. Riki Choshu for the IWGP Heavyweight Championship	
7	1998	Final Power Hall in Tokyo Dome	Kensuke Sasaki (c) vs. Keiji Mutoh for the IWGP Heavyweight Championship	
8	1999	Wrestling World 1999	Scott Norton (c) vs. Keiji Mutoh for the IWGP Heavyweight Championship	
9	2000	Wrestling World 2000	Genichiro Tenryu (c) vs. Kensuke Sasaki for the IWGP Heavyweight Championship	
10	2001	Wrestling World 2001	Kensuke Sasaki vs. Toshiaki Kawada in the IWGP Heavyweight Championship tournament final	
11	2002	Wrestling World 2002	Jun Akiyama (c) vs. Yuji Nagata for the GHC Heavyweight Championship	
12	2003	Wrestling World 2003	Yuji Nagata (c) vs. Josh Barnett for the IWGP Heavyweight Championship	
13	2004	Wrestling World 2004	Shinsuke Nakamura (IWGP) vs. Yoshihiro Takayama (NWF) for the IWGP Heavyweight Championship and NWF Heavyweight Championship	
14	2005	Toukon Festival: Wrestling World 2005	Hiroshi Tanahashi (c) vs. Shinsuke Nakamura for the IWGP U-30 Openweight Championship	
Toukon Shidou
15	2006	Toukon Shidou Chapter 1	Brock Lesnar (c) vs. Shinsuke Nakamura for the IWGP Heavyweight Championship	
Wrestle Kingdom
16	2007	Wrestle Kingdom I	Keiji Mutoh and Masahiro Chono vs. Tencozy (Hiroyoshi Tenzan and Satoshi Kojima)	
17	2008	Wrestle Kingdom II	Hiroshi Tanahashi (c) vs. Shinsuke Nakamura for the IWGP Heavyweight Championship	
18	2009	Wrestle Kingdom III	Keiji Mutoh (c) vs. Hiroshi Tanahashi for the IWGP Heavyweight Championship	
19	2010	Wrestle Kingdom IV	Shinsuke Nakamura (c) vs. Yoshihiro Takayama for the IWGP Heavyweight Championship	
20	2011	Wrestle Kingdom V	Satoshi Kojima (c) vs. Hiroshi Tanahashi for the IWGP Heavyweight Championship	
21	2012	Wrestle Kingdom VI	Hiroshi Tanahashi (c) vs. Minoru Suzuki for the IWGP Heavyweight Championship	
22	2013	Wrestle Kingdom 7	Hiroshi Tanahashi (c) vs. Kazuchika Okada for the IWGP Heavyweight Championship	
23	2014	Wrestle Kingdom 8	Shinsuke Nakamura (c) vs. Hiroshi Tanahashi for the IWGP Intercontinental Championship	
24	2015	Wrestle Kingdom 9	Hiroshi Tanahashi (c) vs. Kazuchika Okada for the IWGP Heavyweight Championship	
25	2016	Wrestle Kingdom 10	Kazuchika Okada (c) vs. Hiroshi Tanahashi for the IWGP Heavyweight Championship	
26	2017	Wrestle Kingdom 11	Kazuchika Okada (c) vs. Kenny Omega for the IWGP Heavyweight Championship	
27	2018	Wrestle Kingdom 12	Kazuchika Okada (c) vs. Tetsuya Naito for the IWGP Heavyweight Championship	
28	2019	Wrestle Kingdom 13	Kenny Omega (c) vs. Hiroshi Tanahashi for the IWGP Heavyweight Championship	
29	2020	Wrestle Kingdom 14: Night 1	Kazuchika Okada (c) vs. Kota Ibushi for the IWGP Heavyweight Championship	
""	"" (Note: From 2021 to 2023, the Tokyo Dome hosted 2 Wrestle Kingdom events on back-to-back days, with the climax of proceedings actually taking place on January 5.)	Wrestle Kingdom 14: Night 2	Kazuchika Okada (c) vs. Tetsuya Naito for the IWGP Heavyweight Championship and IWGP Intercontinental Championship	
30	2021	Wrestle Kingdom 15: Night 1	Tetsuya Naito (c) vs. Kota Ibushi for the IWGP Heavyweight Championship and IWGP Intercontinental Championship	
""	""	Wrestle Kingdom 15: Night 2	Kota Ibushi (c) vs. Jay White for the IWGP Heavyweight Championship and IWGP Intercontinental Championship	
31	2022	Wrestle Kingdom 16: Night 1	Shingo Takagi (c) vs. Kazuchika Okada for the IWGP World Heavyweight Championship	
""	""	Wrestle Kingdom 16: Night 2	Kazuchika Okada (c) vs. Will Ospreay for the IWGP World Heavyweight Championship	
32	2023	Wrestle Kingdom 17: Night 1 (Note: This was a return to January 4 being the climactic date for NJPW: "Night 2" of this year's Wrestle Kingdom was a collaboration with Pro Wrestling NOAH that took place two weeks later and 40km away, on January 21 in Yokohama Arena.)	Jay White (c) vs. Kazuchika Okada for the IWGP World Heavyweight Championship	
33	2024	Wrestle Kingdom 18	Sanada (c) vs. Tetsuya Naito for the IWGP World Heavyweight Championship	
34	2025	Wrestle Kingdom 19	Zack Sabre Jr. (c) vs. Shota Umino for the IWGP World Heavyweight Championship	
35	2026	Wrestle Kingdom 20	Hiroshi Tanahashi vs. Kazuchika Okada	
36	2027	Wrestle Kingdom 21	TBA	
(c) - refers to the champion(s) heading into the match

== See also ==
- List of New Japan Pro-Wrestling pay-per-view events
- Professional wrestling at the Tokyo Dome
