= Wrestling World 2000 =

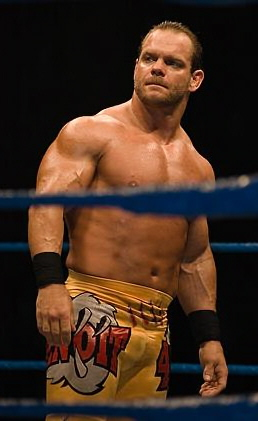
- Chris Benoit, who portrayed his former gimmick "Wild Pegasus" at the event.
- Promotion: New Japan Pro-Wrestling
- Date: January 4, 2000
- City: Tokyo, Japan
- Venue: Tokyo Dome
- Attendance: 53,500

Wrestling World chronology
← Previous; 1999	Next → 2001

New Japan Pro-Wrestling events chronology
← Previous; Final Dome	Next → Wrestling Dontaku 2000

Wrestling World 2000 was a professional wrestling television special event produced by New Japan Pro-Wrestling (NJPW). It took place on January 4, 2000, in the Tokyo Dome. It was the ninth January 4 Tokyo Dome Show held by NJPW. The show drew 53,500 spectators and $5,900,000 in ticket sales.

The event saw the return of World Championship Wrestling's Chris Benoit under the ring name Wild Pegasus, reprising the character he played for NJPW in the early to mid-1990s. The show also featured Rick Steiner and Randy Savage, both working as freelancers brought in specifically for the show. The twelve match card saw a successful defense of the IWGP Junior Heavyweight Tag Team Championship and the IWGP Junior Heavyweight Championship as well as Kensuke Sasaki defeating Genichiro Tenryu to win the IWGP Heavyweight Championship. The undercard featured a match between Masahiro Chono defeated Keiji Mutoh bearing a stipulation that the losing wrestler's faction would have to disband. Chono represented Team 2000, while Mutoh represented nWo Japan. Through Mutoh's loss nWo Japan ceased to be. It also featured the retirement match of Kazuo Yamazaki, as he wrestled his student, Yuji Nagata.

== Production ==
=== Background ===
The January 4 Tokyo Dome Show is NJPW's biggest annual event and has been called "the largest professional wrestling show in the world outside of the United States" and the "Japanese equivalent to the Super Bowl".

=== Storylines ===
Wrestling World 2000 featured professional wrestling matches that involved different wrestlers from pre-existing scripted feuds and storylines. Wrestlers portrayed villains, heroes, or less distinguishable characters in scripted events that built tension and culminated in a wrestling match or series of matches.

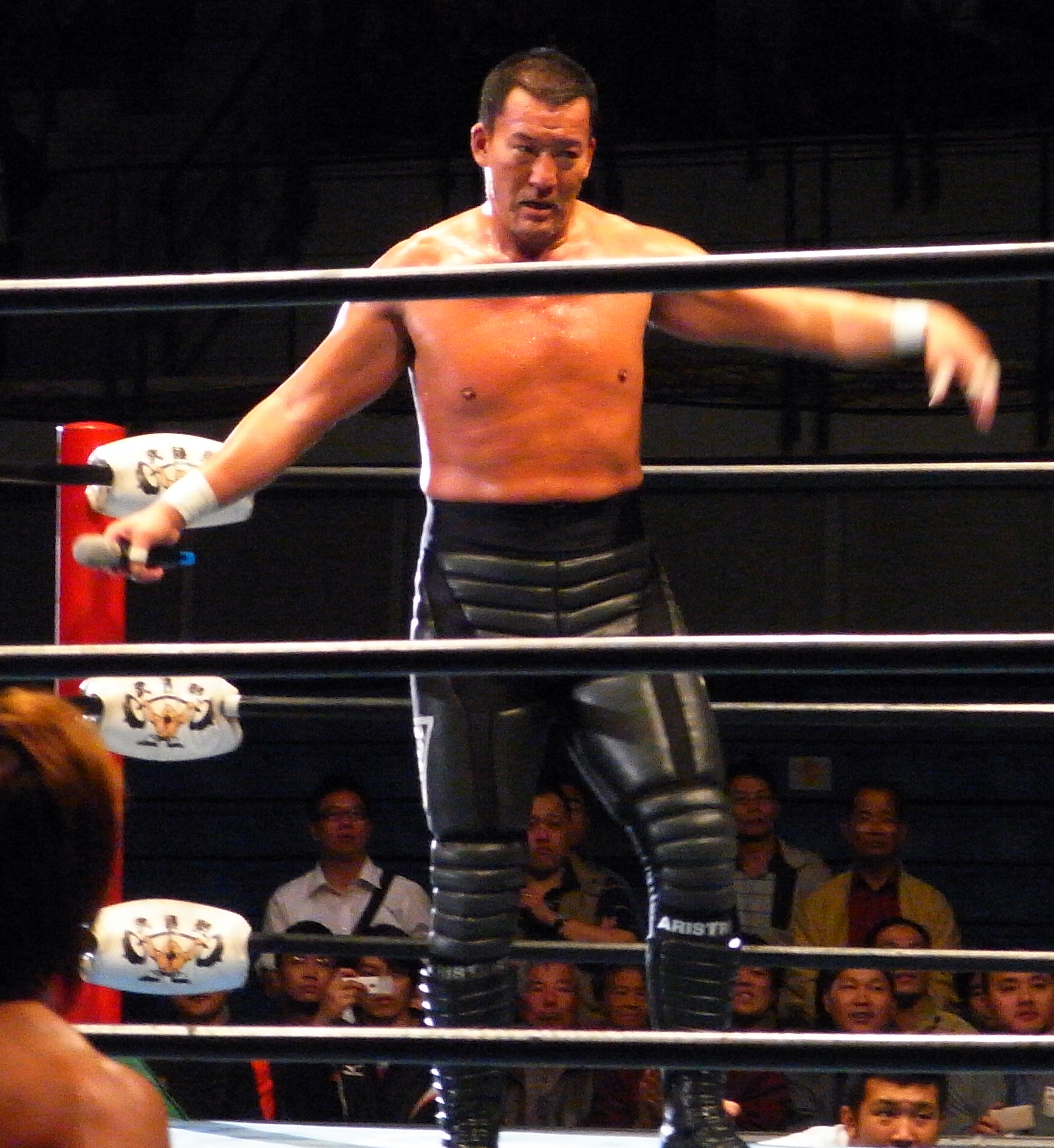
Masahiro Chono, who was leader of Team2000

Among these matches featured a series of stories that were followed throughout the year or in the following months before Wrestling World. At the beginning of 1999, at Wrestling World 1999 Keiji Muto would defeat fellow stablemate of nWo Japan Scott Norton for the IWGP Heavyweight Championship. Watching the match was then sidelined Masahiro Chono (he has been out of action since September 1998 due to a neck injury,) who had disagreements with how Keiji Muto was directing the stable after Chono's injury. Following the match, Chono would storm out and would leave nWo Japan not long afterwards, forming Team2000 with a returning Akira Nogami now referred to as AKIRA during a handicap match on the 5th of February 1999 where Chono would face off against Keiji Muto and Hiro Saito. During the course of the year, Team2000 and nWo Japan would face off against each other in an all-out war, with both sides constantly facing off against each other in 6-man or regular tag bouts. By the end of 1999, the stage was set as following Keiji Muto's loss to Genichiro Tenryu for the IWGP Heavyweight Championship on the 10th of December, Muto and Chono would face off against each other, with the condition being that whoever loses must disband their faction. As well, Scott Norton and Don Frye would also face off against each other, with both men being a part of the respective factions (Frye for Team2000, Norton for nWo Japan.)

Meanwhile, Genichiro Tenryu and Kensuke Sasaki have been engaging in a feud since Genichiro Tenryu beat Kensuke Sasaki at NJPW Final Dome on October 11, 1999, pinning Sasaki with his own trademark move, The Northern Lights Bomb.

Following this, Tenryu had been taunting Kensuke Sasaki, taking Sasaki's finisher and using it for his own benefit even while also discrediting the move. Tenryu would even use the move to win the IWGP Heavyweight Title against Keiji Muto.

With the two at odds with one another, the match was scheduled to be the main event of Wrestling World 2000 for the IWGP Heavyweight Championship.

Kazuo Yamazaki would announce his retirement in November 1999. Yamazaki, a famed wrestler from The UWF and UWFI promotions, would have his retirement match against his student and occasional tag partner Yuji Nagata.

Shinya Hashimoto and Naoya Ogawa since January 4, 1999 have been at war with one another, with Ogawa famously shooting on Shinya Hashimoto, and ever since then the pair have been facing off against each other in one-on-one matches with Ogawa always coming out victorious. In order to have one final shot against Ogawa, Hashimoto would have to face off against him in a tag match, with Hashimoto selecting Takashi Iizuka to go off against Ogawa and Kazunari Murakami, a protégé of Inoki and former member of UFO (Universal Fighting Organization, a MMA and Pro Wrestling hybrid company ran by Antonio Inoki) and PRIDE

Murakami, on the last televised show of 1999, December 10, would storm the ring and call out Iizuka before Iizuka's match, with the pair having to be separated. Afterwards Ogawa would come into the ring too, before being pulled away by company president Tatsumi Fujinami.

With the stakes high, the show was a culmination of a year's worth of storylines coming to an end or adding another chapter into them.

== Results ==
No.	Results	Stipulations	Times
1	Shinjiro Otani and Tatsuhito Takaiwa (c) defeated Kendo Kashin and Minoru Tanaka	Tag team match for the IWGP Junior Heavyweight Tag Team Championship	13:19
2	Shiro Koshinaka defeated Satoshi Kojima	Singles match	10:17
3	Hiroyoshi Tenzan defeated Wild Pegasus	Singles match	10:55
4	Jushin Thunder Liger (c) defeated Koji Kanemoto	Singles match for the IWGP Junior Heavyweight Championship	03:56
5	Manabu Nakanishi defeated Kenzo Suzuki	Singles match	06:41
6	Yuji Nagata defeated Kazuo Yamazaki	Singles match	06:44
7	Kimo defeated Kazuyuki Fujita by disqualification	Singles match	04:02
8	Scott Norton defeated Don Frye	Singles match	08:50
9	Rick Steiner defeated Randy Savage	Singles match	11:08
10	Shinya Hashimoto and Takashi Iizuka defeated Kazunari Murakami and Naoya Ogawa	Tag team match	11:29
11	Masahiro Chono defeated Keiji Mutoh	Singles match	25:00
12	Kensuke Sasaki defeated Genichiro Tenryu (c)	Singles match for the IWGP Heavyweight Championship	14:43
(c) / – the champion(s) heading into the match

== Aftermath ==
Following Wrestling World 2000, Keiji Muto would go on hiatus, not returning underneath his name of Keiji Muto until 2001. Meanwhile, the remainders of nWo Japan would continue to fight Team2000, most notable among them being the team of TenKoji and Hiro Saito. However, by February, those left of nWo Japan would reunite with Team2000.
