= Battle Satellite in Tokyo Dome =

1989 professional wrestling event in Japan

- Promotion: New Japan Pro-Wrestling
- Date: April 24, 1989
- City: Tokyo, Japan
- Venue: Tokyo Dome
- Attendance: 43,800
- Tagline: Super Powers Clash

Event chronology
← Previous —	Next → Super Fight in Tokyo Dome (NJPW)

Battle Satellite in Tokyo Dome (Japanese: '89格闘衛星☆闘強導夢, Hepburn: '89 Kakutō Eisei ☆ Tōkyōdōmu) was a major professional wrestling television special event produced by New Japan Pro-Wrestling (NJPW). The event took place on April 24, 1989, at the Tokyo Dome in Tokyo, Japan. It was the first major professional wrestling event held in the Tokyo Dome, with wrestlers from the United States, Japan, and the Soviet Union.

The event saw a one-night single-elimination tournament for the vacant IWGP Heavyweight Championship, the debut of the Jushin Liger character in NJPW, and Antonio Inoki versus Shota Chochishvili in a no rope martial arts match for the WWF World Martial Arts Heavyweight Championship.

== Background ==
The Tokyo Dome opened on March 17, 1988. At the time, NJPW looked to use the Dome to hold the first major wrestling event of the Heisei period.

== Aftermath ==
Battle Satellite in Tokyo Dome was a great success for NJPW, and the Dome would be a home for many years to come for puroresu. Starting in 1992, NJPW returned to the Dome to hold the first of what has become an annual tradition and their biggest show of the year, the January 4 Tokyo Dome Show.

== Results ==
No.	Results	Stipulations	Times
1	Naoki Sano defeated Hiro Saito	Singles match for the 1989 Young Lion Cup	10:43
2	Big Van Vader defeated Masahiro Chono	IWGP Heavyweight Championship tournament quarterfinal match	5:52
3	Tatsumi Fujinami defeated Vladimir Berkovich by submission	IWGP Heavyweight Championship tournament quarterfinal match	4:51
4	Victor Zangiev defeated Buzz Sawyer	IWGP Heavyweight Championship tournament quarterfinal match	3:56
5	Shinya Hashimoto defeated Riki Choshu	IWGP Heavyweight Championship tournament quarterfinal match	3:41
6	Benny Urquidez vs. Shinya Asuka ended in a draw after five rounds	Kickboxing match	10:00
7	Big Van Vader defeated Tatsumi Fujinami	IWGP Heavyweight Championship tournament semifinal match	14:37
8	Shinya Hashimoto defeated Victor Zangiev by submission	IWGP Heavyweight Championship tournament semifinal match	7:28
9	Wahka Eveloev defeated Masa Saito by submission	Singles match	5:28
10	Big Van Vader defeated Shinya Hashimoto	IWGP Heavyweight Championship tournament final match with Lou Thesz as the guest referee	9:47
11	George Takano & Super Strong Machine defeated Hiroshi Hase & Shiro Koshinaka	Tag team match with Lou Thesz as the guest referee	17:10
12	Jushin Liger defeated Kuniaki Kobayashi	Singles match	9:55
13	Salman Hashimikov defeated Crusher Bam Bam Bigelow	Singles match	2:26
14	Shota Chochishvili defeated Antonio Inoki (c) by knockout in five rounds	No rope martial arts match for the WWF World Martial Arts Heavyweight Championship	13:20
(c) / – the champion(s) heading into the match

== IWGP Heavyweight Championship tournament bracket ==
Quarterfinals
Big Van Vader	Pin
Masahiro Chono	5:52
Tatsumi Fujinami	Sub
Vladimir Berkovich	4:51
Victor Zangiev	Pin
Buzz Sawyer	3:56
Shinya Hashimoto	Pin
Riki Choshu	3:41

Semifinals
Big Van Vader	Pin
Tatsumi Fujinami	14:37
Victor Zangiev	7:28
Shinya Hashimoto	Sub

Final
Big Van Vader	Pin
Shinya Hashimoto	9:47
