= NJPW Ultimate Crush =

2003 New Japan Pro-Wrestling event

Ultimate Crush
- Official DVD cover
- Promotion: New Japan Pro-Wrestling
- Date: May 2, 2003
- City: Tokyo, Japan
- Venue: Tokyo Dome
- Attendance: 55,000 (total)

Event chronology
| ← Previous; Ultimate Festival | Next → Best of the Super Junior X |

New Japan Pro-Wrestling events chronology
| ← Previous; Wrestling World 2003 | Next → Wrestling World 2004 |

Ultimate Crush was a major professional wrestling and mixed martial arts pay-per-view event promoted by New Japan Pro-Wrestling (NJPW). The event took place on May 2, 2003, at the Tokyo Dome in Tokyo, Japan. The card contained a mixture of pro wrestling matches and mixed martial arts fights. The show was headlined by Yoshihiro Takayama defending the NWF Heavyweight Championship against Yuji Nagata, who also defended the IWGP Heavyweight Championship in a unification match.

The show also featured participation from Pro Wrestling Noah, as Kenta Kobashi defended the GHC Heavyweight Championship against Masahiro Chono. The only other title match on the show featured Jushin Thunder Liger and Koji Kanemoto defending the IWGP Junior Heavyweight Tag Team Championship against Heat and Tiger Mask IV. Ultimate Crush featured 6 professional wrestling matches and 5 mixed martial arts fights contested under Vale Tudo rules, with a total of 11 matches on the card.

== Production ==
=== Background ===
In April 2002, Yoshihiro Takayama re-debuted in New Japan Pro-Wrestling (NJPW) by attacking Yuji Nagata after he had won the IWGP Heavyweight Championship from Tadao Yasuda in Nippon Budokan and began a long running feud with Nagata. Takayama quickly skyrocketed up the card and became one of the most well-known pro wrestlers in Japan. Thanks to his fights in Pride Fighting Championship. In the same year, Antonio Inoki declared the NWF Heavyweight Championship would return, and a tournament was set up throughout later part of 2002 and early 2003. At Wrestling World 2003, Takayama defeated Tsuyoshi Kosaka in the final of the tournament to win the vacant title. While Takayama was NWF Champion, Nagata had held the IWGP Heavyweight Championship for over a year. A unification match was later set up for Ultimate Crush, where the winner would get both belts.

On January 10, 2003, Masahiro Chono debuted for Pro Wrestling Noah, teaming with Mitsuharu Misawa in a loss to Kenta Kobashi and Akira Taue in what was called a "dream match", pitting All Japan's top stars of the 1990s against New Japan's top villain of the 1990s. On April 13, Chono was in attendance to watch Kobashi successfully defend the GHC Heavyweight Championship against Tamon Honda at Ariake Coliseum, and after the match, was invited to ringside by Kobashi. Chono expressed his wish to challenge for the GHC Heavyweight Title in the Tokyo Dome on May 2, in what he called a "Mr. Pro Wrestling vs Mr. Pro Wrestling" match.

In early 2003, Kazunari Murakami and the Makai Club began a feud with Michiyoshi Ohara's Crazy Dog's stable, with the two exchanging wins throughout the start of the year. On January 4, Ohara teamed with Shinsuke Nakamura to beat Murakami and Tadao Yasuda at Wrestling World 2003, and on March 21 Makai Club beat Crazy Dogs. However, Masahiro Chono came to their aid during a post match beatdown and helped the Crazy Dogs stuff Makai Club president Kantaro Hoshino into a doghouse, something that would become a trademark of the Crazy Dogs. During this time, Crazy Dogs recruited MMA fighter Enson Inoue to join the group and combat Kazunari Murakami, and a match was later set up to pit Murakami against Inoue in the Tokyo Dome.

=== Storylines ===
Ultimate Crush featured professional wrestling matches that involved different wrestlers from pre-existing scripted feuds and storylines. Wrestlers portrayed villains, heroes, or less distinguishable characters in scripted events that built tension and culminated in a wrestling match or series of matches.

== Results ==
| No. | Results | Stipulations | Times |
|---|---|---|---|
| 1 | Hiroyoshi Tenzan defeated Hiroshi Tanahashi | Singles match to determine the #1 contender for the IWGP Heavyweight Championship | 10:24 |
| 2 | Ken Shamrock defeated Takashi Iizuka | Singles match | 11:44 |
| 3 | Jushin Thunder Liger and Koji Kanemoto (c) defeated Heat and Tiger Mask IV | Tag team match for the IWGP Junior Heavyweight Tag Team Championship | 19:50 |
| 4 | Lyoto Machida defeated Kengo Watanabe by unanimous decision | Vale Tudo rules | 5:00 |
| 5 | Tsuyoshi Kosaka defeated Dolgorsürengiin Sumyaabazar by TKO | Vale Tudo rules | 2:58 |
| 6 | Shinsuke Nakamura defeated Jan Nortje by submission | Vale Tudo rules | 3:12 |
| 7 | Josh Barnett defeated Jimmy Ambriz by TKO | Vale Tudo rules | 3:05 |
| 8 | Kazuyuki Fujita defeated Manabu Nakanishi by TKO | Vale Tudo rules | 1:09 |
| 9 | Enson Inoue defeated Kazunari Murakami | Singles match | 6:33 |
| 10 | Kenta Kobashi (c) defeated Masahiro Chono | Singles match for the GHC Heavyweight Championship | 28:27 |
| 11 | Yoshihiro Takayama (c ─ NWF) defeated Yuji Nagata (c ─ IWGP) | Singles match for the IWGP Heavyweight Championship and NWF Heavyweight Championship | 18:17 |
(c) / – the champion(s) heading into the match

== Aftermath ==
After beating Nagata, Yoshihiro Takayama overcame both the IWGP Heavyweight Championship and NWF Heavyweight Championship separately throughout the rest of 2003. He successfully defended the NWF title against Shinsuke Nakamura, Tadao Yasuda and Minoru Suzuki, and successfully defended the IWGP title against Hiroyoshi Tenzan and Masahiro Chono twice, including in a cage deathmatch. Takayama dropped the IWGP title to Tenzan on November 3, but retained the NWF title until January 4, 2004, when he lost to IWGP Heavyweight Champion Shinsuke Nakamura in a unification match, effectively retiring the NWF Heavyweight Championship once again.

Enson Inoue and Kazunari Murakami would face off once more in June, with Inoue once again winning by referee stoppage. After the Crazy Dogs began to break up, Inoue primarily aligned himself with Yuji Nagata and the rest of the New Japan sekigun before leaving New Japan in early 2004.
