= Willy Wilhelm =

Dutch judoka (born 1958)

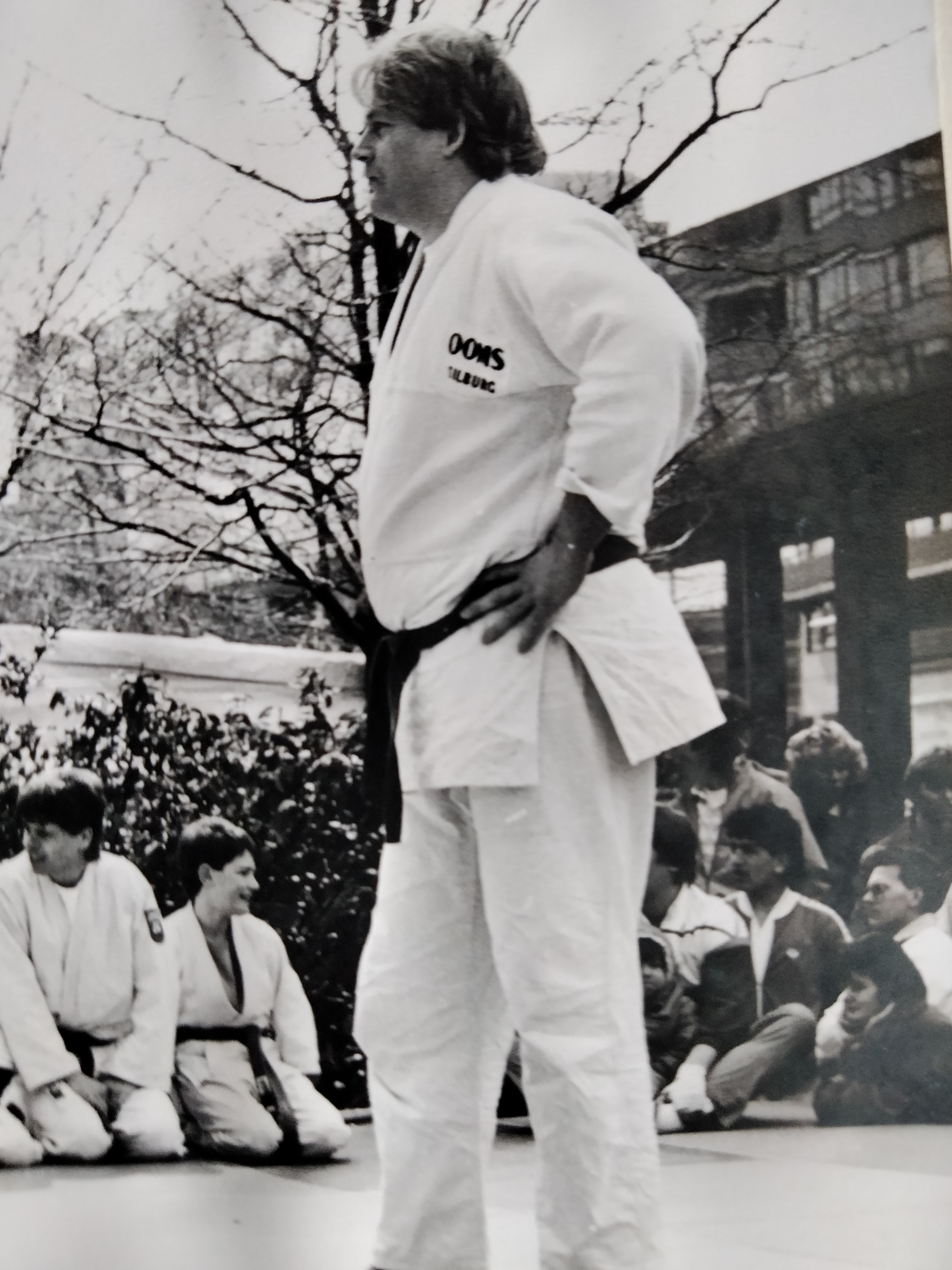

Wilhelmus Paul Karel ("Willy") Wilhelm (born 16 September 1958 in 's-Hertogenbosch) is a Dutch former Judoka. He represented his country at the 1984 Summer Olympics in Los Angeles. He lost in the first round in the over 95 kg category. He was more successful at the World Judo Championships where he got silver in 1983 in the over 95 kg category and bronze in 1985 in the open category. He also main evented a Universal Wrestling Federation (a shoot style professional wrestling promotion) event at the Tokyo Dome on November 29, 1989 in front of 60,000 spectators, losing to Akira Maeda.
