= Wrestling World 1999 =

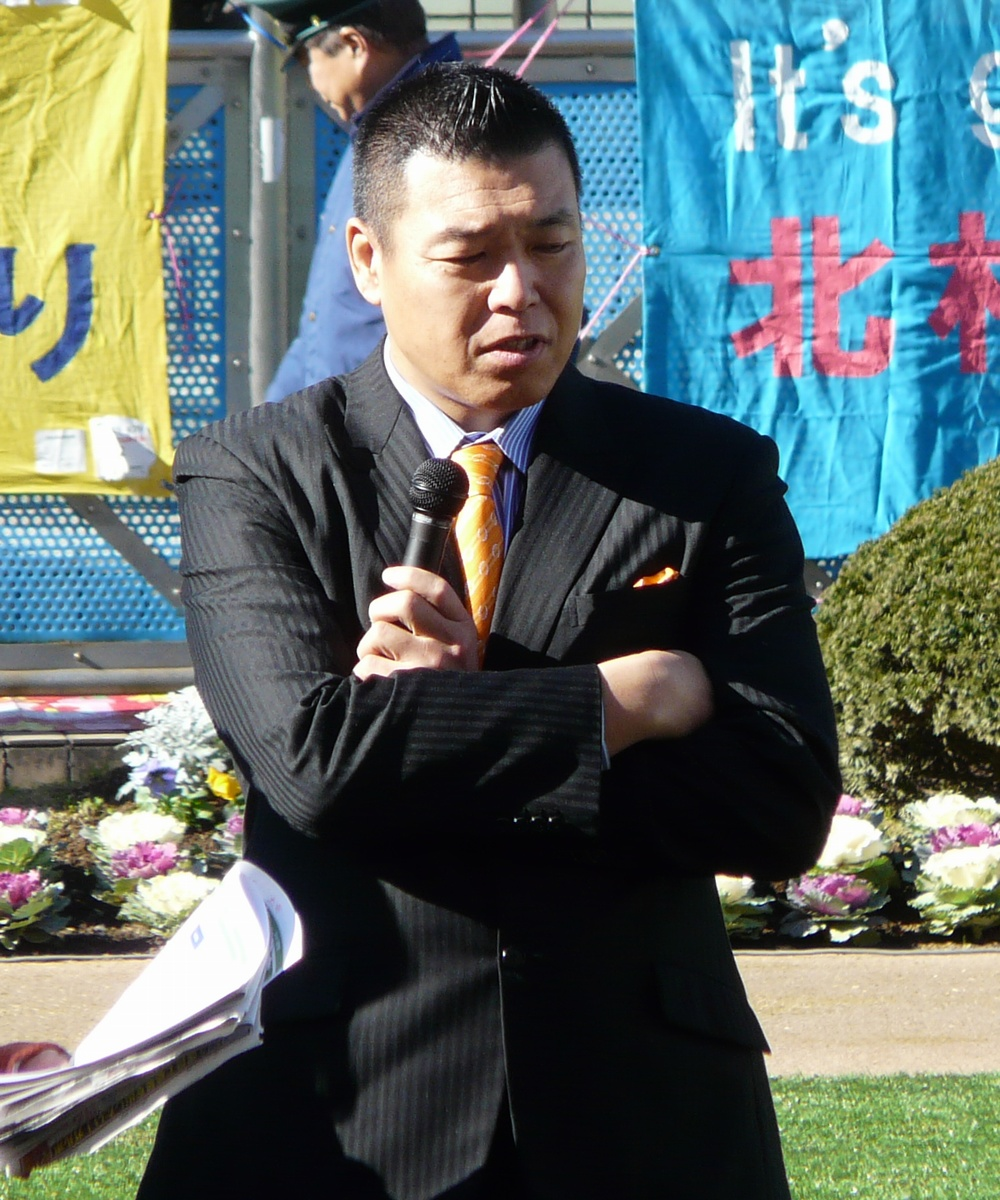
- Naoya Ogawa, who wrestled Shinya Hashimoto to a no contest at the event.
- Promotion: New Japan Pro-Wrestling
- Date: January 4, 1999
- City: Tokyo, Japan
- Venue: Tokyo Dome
- Attendance: 52,500

January 4 Tokyo Dome Show chronology
← Previous; Final Power Hall in Tokyo Dome	Next → Wrestling World

New Japan Pro-Wrestling events chronology
← Previous; Final Power Hall in Tokyo Dome	Next → Jingu Climax

Wrestling World 1999 was a professional wrestling television special event produced by New Japan Pro-Wrestling (NJPW). It took place on January 4, 1999 in the Tokyo Dome. Wrestling World 1999 was the eighth January 4 Tokyo Dome Show held by NJPW. The show drew 52,500 spectators and $5,300,000 in ticket sales. The show featured 10 matches in total including four championship matches, three of which saw the championship change hands.

== Production ==
=== Background ===
The January 4 Tokyo Dome Show is NJPW's biggest annual event and has been called "the largest professional wrestling show in the world outside of the United States" and the "Japanese equivalent to the Super Bowl".

=== Storylines ===
Wrestling World 1999 featured professional wrestling matches that involved different wrestlers from pre-existing scripted feuds and storylines. Wrestlers portrayed villains, heroes, or less distinguishable characters in scripted events that built tension and culminated in a wrestling match or series of matches.

== Results ==
No.	Results	Stipulations	Times
1	Manabu Nakanishi defeated Kazuyuki Fujita	Singles match	11:10
2	Osamu Kido, Tadao Yasuda and Tatsumi Fujinami defeated Kengo Kimura, Michiyoshi Ohara and Tatsutoshi Goto	Six-man tag team match	09:17
3	Dr. Wagner Jr. and Kendo Kashin defeated Shinjiro Otani and Tatsuhito Takaiwa (c)	Tag team match for the IWGP Junior Heavyweight Tag Team Championship	16:53
4	Jushin Thunder Liger (c) defeated Koji Kanemoto	Singles match for the IWGP Junior Heavyweight Championship	23:11
5	Kensuke Sasaki defeated Atsushi Onita by disqualification	Singles match	05:55
6	Yuji Nagata defeated David Beneteau	Singles match	05:30
7	Don Frye defeated Brian Johnston via referee stoppage	Singles match	07:55
8	Shinya Hashimoto vs. Naoya Ogawa ended in a no contest	Singles match	06:58
9	Tencozy (Hiroyoshi Tenzan and Satoshi Kojima) defeated Genichiro Tenryu and Shiro Koshinaka (c)	Tag team match for the IWGP Tag Team Championship	16:35
10	Keiji Mutoh defeated Scott Norton (c)	Singles match for the IWGP Heavyweight Championship	19:01
(c) / – the champion(s) heading into the match
