= The New Beginning in Hiroshima (2021) =

2021 professional wrestling event

- Promotion: New Japan Pro-Wrestling
- Date: February 10–11, 2021
- City: Hiroshima, Japan
- Venue: Hiroshima Sun Plaza Hall
- Attendance: Night 1: 1,135; Night 2: 2,007

Event chronology
← Previous; Road to The New Beginning	Next → Road to Castle Attack

The New Beginning chronology
← Previous; Nagoya	Next → USA

The New Beginning in Hiroshima was a professional wrestling event promoted by New Japan Pro-Wrestling (NJPW). The event took place on February 10 and 11, 2021 in Hiroshima, Hiroshima at the Hiroshima Sun Plaza Hall. It was the thirty-first event promoted under the NJPW The New Beginning name and the second in Hiroshima, the last being The New Beginning in Hiroshima in 2014.

The event featured thirteen matches across both days. The first day was main evented by Hiromu Takahashi making his first defence of the IWGP Junior Heavyweight Championship against Sho. The first day also features Guerrillas of Destiny defending the IWGP Tag Team Championship against Dangerous Tekkers. The second night main event saw Kota Ibushi face against Sanada for the IWGP Heavyweight and IWGP Intercontinental Championships.

== Production ==
Other on-screen personnel
Role:	Name:
English Commentators	Kevin Kelly
English Commentators	Chris Charlton
English Commentators	Rocky Romero
Japanese Commentators	Shinpei Nogami
Japanese Commentators	Milano Collection A.T.
Japanese Commentators	Katsuhiko Kanazawa
Japanese Commentators	Kazuyoshi Sakai
Japanese Commentators	Togi Makabe
Japanese Commentators	Miki Motoi
Japanese Commentators	Jushin Thunder Liger
Japanese Commentators	Masahiro Chono
Ring announcers	Makoto Abe
Ring announcers	Kimihiko Ozaki
Referees	Kenta Sato
Referees	Marty Asami
Referees	Red Shoes Unno

=== Background ===
Since 2020, NJPW has been unable to run events with a full arena capacity due to COVID-19 restrictions. The New Beginning is NJPW's first major show after their annual January 4 Tokyo Dome Show, which is their biggest show of the year.

=== Storylines ===
The New Beginning in Hiroshima's events featured thirteen professional wrestling matches across both days that involve different wrestlers from pre-existing scripted feuds and storylines. Wrestlers portray villains, heroes, or less distinguishable characters in the scripted events that build tension and culminate in a wrestling match or series of matches.

At the G1 Climax 30 final, Kota Ibushi defeated Sanada to win the tournament for the second time in a row. At Wrestle Kingdom 15, Ibushi won the IWGP Heavyweight Championship for the first time in his career and the IWGP Intercontinental Championship the second time after defeating Tetsuya Naito in the first night's main event. The next night, he successfully defended both belts against Jay White. Ibushi then proclaimed that her had finally 'became god' and declared he would seek to unify the IWGP Heavyweight & Intercontinental belts. After the defence, Sanada came into the ring and challenged Ibushi for the belts, asking if Ibushi would accept 'the gift' of Sanada, which Ibushi accepted. The match was made for The New Beginning in Hiroshima's second night on February 11.

During the 2020 Best of the Super Juniors tournament, Sho defeated eventual tournament winner Hiromu Takahashi in their round-robin match. At Wrestle Kingdom, Takahashi won the IWGP Junior Heavyweight Championship for the fourth time against Taiji Ishimori and after the match, nominated Sho as his desired first challenger. This will be Sho's first challenge for the belt in his career as he has been primarily a tag team wrestler working with Yoh and Rocky Romero as Roppongi 3K. The match was made for The New Beginning in Hiroshima's first night on February 10.

== Results ==
=== Night 1 (February 10) ===
No.	Results	Stipulations	Times
1	Suzuki-gun (Minoru Suzuki, El Desperado, and Yoshinobu Kanemaru) defeated Yota Tsuji, Yuya Uemura, and Gabriel Kidd by referee stoppage	Six-man tag team match	8:01
2	Bushi defeated Master Wato (with Hiroyoshi Tenzan)	Singles match	11:08
3	Chaos (Kazuchika Okada, Toru Yano, Hirooki Goto, Tomohiro Ishii, and Yoshi-Hashi) defeated Bullet Club (Jay White, Evil, Yujiro Takahashi, Taiji Ishimori, and El Phantasmo) (with Dick Togo and Gedo)	Ten-man tag team match	12:08
4	Los Ingobernables de Japón (Sanada and Tetsuya Naito) defeated Kota Ibushi and Tomoaki Honma	Tag team match	11:02
5	Guerrillas of Destiny (Tama Tonga and Tanga Loa) (with Jado) (c) defeated Dangerous Tekkers (Taichi and Zack Sabre Jr.) (with Douki) by disqualification	Tag team match for the IWGP Tag Team Championship	29:08
6	Hiromu Takahashi (c) defeated Sho	Singles match for the IWGP Junior Heavyweight Championship	35:38
(c) / – the champion(s) heading into the match

=== Night 2 (February 11) ===
No.	Results	Stipulations	Times
1	Suzuki-gun (Taichi, Zack Sabre Jr., and Douki) defeated Yota Tsuji, Yuya Uemura, and Gabriel Kidd by submission	Six-man tag team match	8:51
2	Tomoaki Honma, Sho, and Master Wato defeated Suzuki-gun (Minoru Suzuki, El Desperado, and Yoshinobu Kanemaru)	Six-man tag team match	8:07
3	Los Ingobernables de Japón (Tetsuya Naito, Hiromu Takahashi, and Bushi) defeated Bullet Club (Yujiro Takahashi, Taiji Ishimori, and El Phantasmo)	Six-man tag team match	9:54
4	Chaos (Kazuchika Okada and Toru Yano) vs. Bullet Club (Evil and Dick Togo) ended in a double countout	Tag team match	1:27
5	Kazuchika Okada defeated Evil by disqualification	Singles match	5:41
6	Chaos (Tomohiro Ishii, Hirooki Goto, and Yoshi-Hashi) (c) defeated Bullet Club (Jay White, Tama Tonga, and Tanga Loa) (with Jado and Gedo)	Six-man tag team match for the NEVER Openweight 6-Man Tag Team Championship	27:01
7	Kota Ibushi (c) defeated Sanada	Singles match for the IWGP Heavyweight Championship and IWGP Intercontinental Championship	27:51
(c) / – the champion(s) heading into the match

== See also ==
- 2021 in professional wrestling
- List of NJPW major events
