= Castle Attack =

2021 professional wrestling event

- Promotion: New Japan Pro-Wrestling
- Date: February 27–28, 2021
- City: Osaka, Japan
- Venue: Osaka-jō Hall
- Attendance: Night 1: 1,846; Night 2: 3,218

Event chronology
← Previous; The New Beginning in Hiroshima; Road to Castle Attack	Next → 49th Anniversary Event

Castle Attack was a professional wrestling event promoted by New Japan Pro-Wrestling (NJPW). The event took place on February 27 and 28, 2021, in Osaka, Osaka at Osaka-jō Hall.

The event featured 12 matches across both days. The first day saw Kazuchika Okada defeating Evil in the main event with other prominent matches including Jay White defeating Tomohiro Ishii. The second day main event saw Kota Ibushi successfully defend the IWGP Intercontinental Championship against Tetsuya Naito, making this the first time the IWGP Intercontinental Championship was defended separately from the IWGP Heavyweight Championship since Wrestle Kingdom 14. Other matches on the card for the second day included El Desperado defeating El Phantasmo and Bushi to win the vacant IWGP Junior Heavyweight Championship, which the title was vacated by former champion Hiromu Takahashi after suffering a shoulder injury (Takahashi was originally scheduled to defend the title against El Phantasmo at the event). Hiroshi Tanahashi also successfully defended the NEVER Openweight Championship against Great-O-Khan.

== Production ==
Other on-screen personnel
Role:	Name:
English Commentators	Kevin Kelly
English Commentators	Chris Charlton
English Commentators	Rocky Romero
Japanese Commentators	Shinpei Nogami
Japanese Commentators	Milano Collection A.T.
Japanese Commentators	Katsuhiko Kanazawa
Japanese Commentators	Kazuyoshi Sakai
Japanese Commentators	Togi Makabe
Japanese Commentators	Miki Motoi
Japanese Commentators	Jushin Thunder Liger
Japanese Commentators	Masahiro Chono
Ring announcers	Makoto Abe
Ring announcers	Kimihiko Ozaki
Referees	Kenta Sato
Referees	Marty Asami
Referees	Red Shoes Unno

=== Background ===
Since 2020, NJPW has unable to run events with a full arena capacity due to COVID-19 restrictions. The New Beginning is NJPW's first major show after their annual January 4 Tokyo Dome Show, which is their biggest show of the year. On December 25, NJPW announced Castle Attack for February 27 and 28, 2021.

=== Storylines ===
Castle Attack featured twelve professional wrestling matches across both days that involve different wrestlers from pre-existing scripted feuds and storylines. Wrestlers portray villains, heroes, or less distinguishable characters in the scripted events that build tension and culminate in a wrestling match or series of matches.

Since New Year Dash!!, Kazuchika Okada has been asking for a match with Evil. On night two of The New Beginning in Hiroshima, Okada teamed with Toru Yano to take on Evil and Dick Togo but the match ended due to a double countout as Evil attacked Okada outside of the ring with a steel chair. After the match, Okada asked for an impromptu match with Evil which he accepted; although the match ended by disqualification after inference by Togo. NJPW later announced a rematch between Okada and Evil was scheduled for Castle Attack.

After winning the IWGP Heavyweight Championship and IWGP Intercontinental Championship from Tetsuya Naito at Wrestle Kingdom 15, Kota Ibushi declared that he wants to unify the championships into one belt. At The New Beginning in Hiroshima, Ibushi made his first successful defence for both championships against Sanada. After the match, Naito came out and challenged Ibushi for the IWGP Intercontinental Championship; stating that since he lost at Wrestle Kingdom 15 that he feel that he doesn't have the right to challenge for both championships but he doesn't want Ibushi to unify the titles, deciding to only challenge for the Intercontinental Championship; Ibushi accepted Naito's challenge. The match was scheduled for Castle Attack.

Hiromu Takahashi was originally scheduled to face El Phantasmo for the IWGP Junior Heavyweight Championship, but on February 22, it was learned that Takahashi suffered a left pectoral tear, which will leave him out of action for six months. On February 25, Takahashi vacated the championship, and a three-way match between El Phantasmo, El Desperado, and Bushi for the vacant title was announced.

== Results ==
=== Night 1 (February 27) ===
No.	Results	Stipulations	Times
1	United Empire (Will Ospreay, Great-O-Khan, and Jeff Cobb) defeated Hiroshi Tanahashi and Tencozy (Hiroyoshi Tenzan and Satoshi Kojima)	Six-man tag team match	10:22
2	Tanga Loa defeated Yoshi-Hashi	Singles match	12:58
3	Hirooki Goto defeated Tama Tonga	Singles match	6:39
4	Toru Yano (c) defeated Chase Owens	YTR Style Texas Strap match for the Provisional KOPW 2021 Trophy; The first one to pull out all corner pad consecutively while strapped to the opponent wins	12:50
5	Jay White defeated Tomohiro Ishii	Singles match	25:42
6	Kazuchika Okada defeated Evil	Singles match	28:11
(c) / – the champion(s) heading into the match

=== Night 2 (February 28) ===
No.	Results	Stipulations	Times
1	Tencozy (Hiroyoshi Tenzan and Satoshi Kojima) defeated United Empire (Will Ospreay and Jeff Cobb)	Tag team match	9:56
2	Chaos (Kazuchika Okada, Tomohiro Ishii, and Toru Yano) defeated Bullet Club (Jay White, Evil, and Chase Owens) by submission	Six-man tag team match	8:35
3	Guerrillas of Destiny (Tama Tonga and Tanga Loa) (c) defeated Chaos (Hirooki Goto and Yoshi-Hashi)	Tag team match for the IWGP Tag Team Championship	15:46
4	Hiroshi Tanahashi (c) defeated Great-O-Khan	Singles match for the NEVER Openweight Championship	18:44
5	El Desperado defeated El Phantasmo and Bushi	Three-way match for the vacant IWGP Junior Heavyweight Championship	23:12
6	Kota Ibushi (c) defeated Tetsuya Naito	Singles match for the IWGP Intercontinental Championship	27:50
(c) / – the champion(s) heading into the match

== See also ==
- 2021 in professional wrestling
- List of major NJPW events
