= The New Beginning in Nagoya (2021) =

2021 professional wrestling event

- Promotion: New Japan Pro-Wrestling
- Date: January 30, 2021
- City: Nagoya, Japan
- Venue: Aichi Prefectural Gymnasium (Dolphins Arena)
- Attendance: 2,156

Event chronology
← Previous; New Year Dash!! Road to The New Beginning	Next → Road to The New Beginning

The New Beginning chronology
← Previous; Osaka (2020)	Next → Hiroshima (2021)

The New Beginning in Nagoya was a professional wrestling event promoted by New Japan Pro-Wrestling (NJPW). The event took place on January 30, 2021 in Nagoya, Aichi at the Aichi Prefectural Gymnasium (Dolphins Arena). This was the thirtieth event promoted under the NJPW The New Beginning name and the first to be held in Nagoya.

The event featured five matches on the card. The main event was Shingo Takagi defending the NEVER Openweight Championship against Hiroshi Tanahashi. Other matches included Hiroyoshi Tenzan of Tencozy taking on Great-O-Khan of United Empire and their teammates, Satoshi Kojima and Will Ospreay, also squared off in the semi-main event.

== Production ==
Other on-screen personnel
Role:	Name:
English Commentators	Kevin Kelly
English Commentators	Chris Charlton
English Commentators	Rocky Romero
Japanese Commentators	Shinpei Nogami
Japanese Commentators	Milano Collection A.T.
Japanese Commentators	Katsuhiko Kanazawa
Japanese Commentators	Kazuyoshi Sakai
Japanese Commentators	Togi Makabe
Japanese Commentators	Miki Motoi
Japanese Commentators	Jushin Thunder Liger
Japanese Commentators	Masahiro Chono
Ring announcers	Makoto Abe
Ring announcers	Kimihiko Ozaki
Referees	Kenta Sato
Referees	Marty Asami
Referees	Red Shoes Unno

=== Background ===
Since 2020, NJPW are unable to run events with full capacity due to COVID-19 restrictions. The New Beginning is NJPW's first major show after their annual January 4 Tokyo Dome Show, which is their biggest show of the year.

=== Storylines ===
The New Beginning in Nagoya featured five professional wrestling matches that involve different wrestlers from pre-existing scripted feuds and storylines. Wrestlers portray villains, heroes, or less distinguishable characters in the scripted events that build tension and culminate in a wrestling match or series of matches.

On night two of Wrestle Kingdom 15, Shingo Takagi successfully defended the NEVER Openweight Championship against Jeff Cobb. At New Year Dash!!, Takagi issued a challenge to Hiroshi Tanahashi for the championship, the match was scheduled for The New Beginning in Nagoya.

On night one of Wrestle Kingdom 15, both Great-O-Khan and Will Ospreay from the stable The Empire lost their matches. At New Year Dash!!, The Empire defeated Satoshi Kojima, Hiroyoshi Tenzan and Yota Tsuji in a match. Post-match; Ospreay, Great-O-Khan and Cobb attacked Kojima and Tenzan, Ospreay proclaims that The Empire will take over 2021 and the stable will now be called United Empire. Ospreay and Great-O-Khan was scheduled to face Kojima and Tenzan in single matches. During the Road to New Beginning on January 25, Ospreay challenged Kojima to a No Disqualification match which Kojima accepted. NJPW confirmed the No Disqualification stipulation for Ospreay vs. Kojima after the event, they also announced that the loser of Great-O-Khan vs. Tenzan must stop using the Mongolian chop.

== Results ==
No.	Results	Stipulations	Times
1	Chaos (Kazuchika Okada and Toru Yano) defeated Bullet Club (Evil and Yujiro Takahashi)	Tag team match	7:40
2	Kota Ibushi, Tomoaki Honma, Sho, and Master Wato defeated Los Ingobernables de Japón (Sanada, Tetsuya Naito, Hiromu Takahashi, and Bushi)	Eight-man tag team match	11:32
3	Great-O-Khan defeated Hiroyoshi Tenzan	Singles match Since Tenzan lost, he must stop using the Mongolian chop	12:45
4	Will Ospreay defeated Satoshi Kojima	No Disqualification match	16:57
5	Hiroshi Tanahashi defeated Shingo Takagi (c)	Singles match for the NEVER Openweight Championship	35:40
(c) / – the champion(s) heading into the match

== See also ==
- 2021 in professional wrestling
- List of major NJPW events
