= Wrestle Kingdom 19 =

2025 New Japan Pro-Wrestling event

- Promotional poster featuring various NJPW wrestlers
- Promotion: New Japan Pro-Wrestling
- Date: January 4, 2025
- City: Tokyo, Japan
- Venue: Tokyo Dome
- Attendance: 24,107
- Tagline: 2 Days to Move the World (Japanese: 世界を動かす2DAYS, Hepburn: Sekai o ugokasu 2 DAYS)

Event chronology
← Previous; Strong Style Evolved	Next → Wrestle Dynasty

Wrestle Kingdom chronology
← Previous; 18	Next → 20

Wrestle Kingdom 19 was a professional wrestling event promoted by the New Japan Pro-Wrestling (NJPW). The event took place on January 4, 2025, at the Tokyo Dome, in Tokyo, Japan. It was the 34th January 4 Tokyo Dome Show and the 19th promoted under the Wrestle Kingdom name.

Ten matches were contested at the event, including one on the pre-show. In the main event, Zack Sabre Jr. defeated Shota Umino to retain the IWGP World Heavyweight Championship. In other prominent matches, Tetsuya Naito defeated Hiromu Takahashi, Yota Tsuji defeated David Finlay to win the IWGP Global Heavyweight Championship, Hiroshi Tanahashi defeated Evil in a Lumberjack match where Tanahashi's professional wrestling career was on the line, and in the opening contest, Ichiban Sweet Boys (Robbie Eagles and Kosei Fujita) defeated Intergalactic Jet Setters (Kevin Knight and Kushida), Catch 2/2 (TJP and Francesco Akira) and Bullet Club War Dogs (Clark Connors and Drilla Moloney) in a Four-way Tokyo Terror ladder match to win the IWGP Junior Heavyweight Tag Team Championship. The event also featured wrestlers from NJPW's partnered promotions All Elite Wrestling (AEW) and Consejo Mundial de Lucha Libre (CMLL).

== Production ==
Other on-screen personnel
Role:	Name:
English Commentators	Kevin Kelly
English Commentators	Chris Charlton
English Commentators	Gino Gambino
English Commentators	Rocky Romero
Japanese Commentators	Shinpei Nogami
Japanese Commentators	Milano Collection A.T.
Japanese Commentators	Katsuhiko Kanazawa
Japanese Commentators	Kazuyoshi Sakai
Japanese Commentators	Togi Makabe (Guest)
Japanese Commentators	Masahiro Chono (Guest)
Ring announcers	Hidekazu Tanaka
Ring announcers	Kimihiko Ozaki
Ring announcers	Makoto Abe
Referees	Norio Honaga
Referees	Kenta Sato
Referees	Yuya Sakamoto
Referees	Marty Asami
Referees	Red Shoes Unno
Referees	Tiger Hattori

=== Background ===
The January 4 Tokyo Dome Show is NJPW's biggest annual event and has been called "the largest professional wrestling show in the world outside of the United States" and the "Japanese equivalent to the Super Bowl". The show has been promoted under the Wrestle Kingdom name since 2007.

Wrestle Kingdom 19 was announced on July 3, 2024.

=== Storylines ===
Wrestle Kingdom 19 featured professional wrestling matches that involved different wrestlers from pre-existing scripted feuds and storylines. Wrestlers portrayed villains, heroes, or less distinguishable characters in the scripted events that built tension and culminated in a wrestling match or series of matches.

=== Event ===
The event started with the preshow New Japan Ranbo won by Hirooki Goto by last eliminating Great-O-Khan to become the number one contender for the IWGP World Heavyweight Championship. Next up, Robbie Eagles and Kosei Fujita defeated reigning champions Kevin Knight and Kushida to win the IWGP Junior Heavyweight Tag Team Championship in a Tokyo Terror ladder match which also involved the teams of TJP and Francesco Akira, and Clark Connors and Drilla Moloney. The third bout saw Mayu Iwatani defeating AZM to secure the ninth consecutive defense of the IWGP Women's Championship. In the fourth bout, El Phantasmo defeated reigning champion Ren Narita to win the NJPW World Television Championship in a four-way match which also involved Jeff Cobb and Ryohei Oiwa, ending Narita's reign at 82 days and no defenses. Next up, Hiroshi Tanahashi defeated Evil in a bout which was disputed for Tanahashi's in-ring career. Next up, Konosuke Takeshita defeated Shingo Takagi in a winner takes all bout to successfully defend his AEW International Championship and win Takagi's NEVER Openweight Championship. The seventh bout saw El Desperado defeating Douki via referee stoppage to win the IWGP Junior Heavyweight Championship after the latter executed a jump, subsequently suffering a legitimate shoulder injury which rendered him unable to continue the match. Next up, Yota Tsuji defeated David Finlay to win the IWGP Global Heavyweight Championship, ending the latter's reign at 245 days and four defenses. In the semi main event, Tetsuya Naito defeated Hiromu Takahashi in singles competition.

In the main event, Zack Sabre Jr. defeated Shota Umino to retain the IWGP World Heavyweight Championship.

== Results ==
No.	Results	Stipulations	Times
1^{P}	Hirooki Goto won by last eliminating Great-O-Khan (Note: Other participants were Josh Barnett, Oleg Boltin, Yuji Nagata, Togi Makabe, Kenta, Yoshi-Hashi, Yujiro Takahashi, Toru Yano, Hiroyoshi Tenzan, Satoshi Kojima, Tomoaki Honma, Sanada, Taichi, Tomohiro Ishii, and Alex Zayne.)	New Japan Ranbo to determine the #1 contender for the IWGP World Heavyweight Championship	34:35
2	Ichiban Sweet Boys (Robbie Eagles and Kosei Fujita) defeated Intergalactic Jet Setters (Kevin Knight and Kushida) (c), Catch 2/2 (TJP and Francesco Akira), and Bullet Club War Dogs (Clark Connors and Drilla Moloney)	Four-way Tokyo Terror ladder match for the IWGP Junior Heavyweight Tag Team Championship	13:05
3	Mayu Iwatani (c) defeated AZM by pinfall	Singles match for the IWGP Women's Championship	8:46
4	El Phantasmo (with Jado) defeated Ren Narita (c), Jeff Cobb, and Ryohei Oiwa (with Hartley Jackson) by pinfall	Four-way match for the NJPW World Television Championship	10:01
5	Hiroshi Tanahashi defeated Evil by pinfall	Lumberjack Deathmatch; Had Tanahashi lost, he would have been forced to retire from in-ring competition. The lumberjacks were: Toru Yano, Oleg Boltin, Tiger Mask, Master Wato, Dick Togo, Sho, Yujiro Takahashi, and Yoshinobu Kanemaru	15:07
6	Konosuke Takeshita (International) (with Don Callis) defeated Shingo Takagi (NEVER) by pinfall	Winner Takes All match for the NEVER Openweight Championship and AEW International Championship	12:46
7	El Desperado defeated Douki (c) by referee stoppage	Singles match for the IWGP Junior Heavyweight Championship	5:23
8	Yota Tsuji defeated David Finlay (c) (with Gedo) by pinfall	Singles match for the IWGP Global Heavyweight Championship	19:39
9	Tetsuya Naito defeated Hiromu Takahashi by pinfall	Singles match	17:08
10	Zack Sabre Jr. (c) (with Hartley Jackson, Kosei Fujita, Robbie Eagles, and Ryohei Oiwa) defeated Shota Umino by pinfall	Singles match for the IWGP World Heavyweight Championship	43:44
(c) / – the champion(s) heading into the match; P / – the match was broadcast on the pre-show

== See also ==
- 2025 in professional wrestling
- List of NJPW pay-per-view events
- Professional wrestling at the Tokyo Dome
