= United Empire =

Professional wrestling stable

- The stable's logo

Stable
- Names: The Empire; United Empire
- Leader(s): Callum Newman (III/NJPW/Main); Will Ospreay (I/AEW)
- Members: See below
- Former members: See below
- Debut: October 16, 2020
- Years active: 2020–present

United Empire (ユナイテッド・エンパイア, Yunaiteddo Enpaia), originally and occasionally still called The Empire (ジ・エンパイア, Ji Enpaia), is a professional wrestling stable. The stable is represented by two branches in New Japan Pro-Wrestling (NJPW) and All Elite Wrestling (AEW). The NJPW branch and overall stable is led by Callum Newman, while the AEW branch is led by Will Ospreay.

The group was formed in October 2020 by Will Ospreay and Great-O-Khan, when Ospreay turned on his Chaos stablemate Kazuchika Okada during the G1 Climax. The stable included Jeff Cobb, Aaron Henare, TJP, Francesco Akira, the team of Aussie Open (Kyle Fletcher & Mark Davis) and Gideon Grey. Ospreay led the stable until 2024, when his contract with NJPW ended and signed with AEW. In 2024, TJP became the leader until 2025, when Callum Newman was pointed as the new leader. Newman won the 2026 New Japan Cup and the IWGP Heavyweight Championship, becoming the youngest wrestler in history to win both achievements

The stable held several titles across several promotions, including AEW, Consejo Mundial de Lucha Libre, Major League Wrestling, and NJPW. Ospreay and Newman are both former IWGP Heawyweight Champions, and Ospreay is the current AEW World Champion in his first reign.

== Concept ==
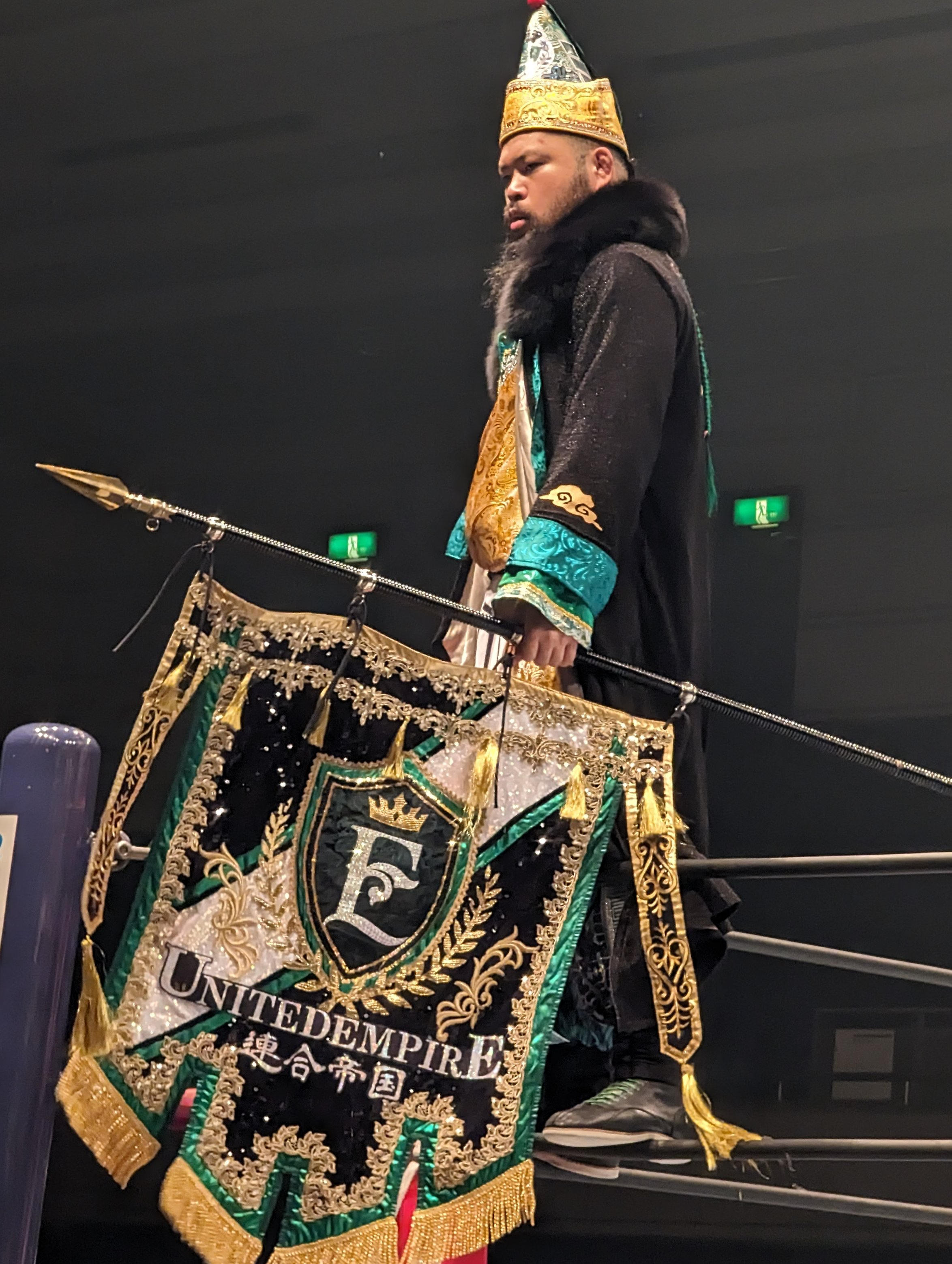
Founding member Great-O-Khan shown carrying a flag depicting the stable's official coat of arms.

The formation's concept is based on the multitude of its members from different countries and cultures. So far, the stable has had members from nine different countries. Kyle Fletcher and Mark Davis from Australia, Mike Bailey from Canada, Alex Windsor, Bea Priestley, Callum Newman, Dan Moloney, Jamie Hayter, and Will Ospreay from England, Francesco Akira from Italy, Great-O-Khan from Japan, Jake Lee representing Korea (Note: Lee is a Zainichi-Korean.), Andrade El Idolo and Templario from Mexico, Aaron Henare, from New Zealand, TJP representing the Philippines (Note: Although born and raised as an American, Perkins is of Filipino descent through his mother.), and finally Jakob Austin Young, Jeff Cobb, and Zane Jay from the United States.

== History ==
=== Formation; Will Ospreay's leadership (2020–2024) ===
==== 2020 ====
On Night 17 of G1 Climax 30, during a match between Chaos members Kazuchika Okada and Will Ospreay, Bea Priestley, Ospreay's girlfriend at the time, made her debut appearance in NJPW, at ringside. As Okada locked his Money Clip submission onto Ospreay, Priestley attempted to enter the ring, distracting the referee in the process. Tomoyuki Oka (now known as Great O-Kharn) then made his surprise return from excursion and entered the ring behind the referee's back, attacking Okada with an iron claw slam, which allowed Ospreay to hit his Storm Breaker finisher, earning him the pinfall victory. After the match, Ospreay turned heel on Okada by attacking him with his Hidden Blade elbow strike to the back of his head. Later, in a backstage interview, Ospreay announced that he would officially leave Chaos to start a new faction with him, Priestley, and O-Kharn called The Empire. O-Kharn later changed the spelling of his name to Great O-Khan, in reference to Genghis Khan of the Mongol Empire. Jeff Cobb joined the stable on November 15 when he was revealed to be O-Khan's mystery tag team partner for the annual World Tag League tournament. The duo would score 10 points (5 wins & 4 losses), not making the final, but getting a win over tournament finalists (and the previous year's winners), FinJuice (Juice Robinson & David Finlay).

==== 2021 ====
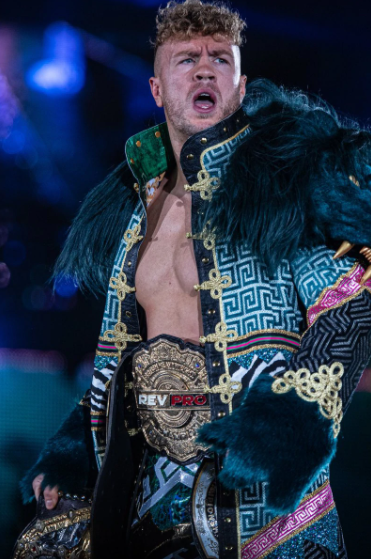
Founding member and original leader of the stable from October 2020 to February 2024, Will Ospreay.

At Wrestle Kingdom 15, O-Khan, Cobb, and Ospreay lost their matches to Hiroshi Tanahashi, Shingo Takagi (for the NEVER Openweight Championship), and Kazuchika Okada, respectively. At New Year Dash!! on January 6, The Empire defeated Tencozy (Hiroyoshi Tenzan & Satoshi Kojima) & Yota Tsuji when O-Khan & Cobb held Tsuji up for a Super OsCutter. After beating down O-Khan's trainer, Tenzan to the point where he had to be stretchered out, Ospreay declared that they would be renamed the United Empire. This change was later reflected on New Japan's websites, along with the group's first logo. After attempting to defend his tag partner from the Empire's attack, Kojima was scheduled to face Ospreay one-on-one at The New Beginning in Nagoya on January 30. O-Khan was also scheduled to face Tenzan one-on-one. All four men squared off a week beforehand in Tenzan's comeback from injury match in Ota City General Gymnasium on January 23, a match won by Ospreay and O-Khan. On January 26, new stipulations were added to the Ospreay vs. Kojima and O-Khan vs. Tenzan matches for The New Beginning in Nagoya. The loser of O-Khan vs. Tenzan is forced to retire their Mongolian Chop, while the Ospreay vs. Kojima match will be contested under no-disqualification rules. O-Khan and Ospreay went on to win their respective matches.

At Castle Attack, United Empire beat the team of Hiroshi Tanahashi and Tencozy on night one, but were unable to win their matches on night two. Ospreay and Cobb lost to Tencozy, while O-Khan failed to capture the NEVER Openweight Championship from Tanahashi. In March, Ospreay won the 2021 New Japan Cup after defeating Shingo Takagi. After the match, Ospreay hit a Os-Cutter on Bea Priestley, kicking her out of the United Empire and saying that he was "only looking out for number one" from now on. Toa Henare, now going by the ring name Aaron Henare, would become the fourth man to join the faction at Sakura Genesis 2021. On the same show Ospreay would defeat Kota Ibushi to win the IWGP World Heavyweight Championship. At Wrestling Dontaku, Ospreay made his first defense of the title when he defeated Shingo Takagi. However, Ospreay would later vacate the title after sustaining a neck injury. He would make his return at NJPW Resurgence, claiming to be the "real world champion", and announcing to not be returning to Japan for that years G1 Climax. In September at the Revolution Pro Wrestling High Stakes event, Ospreay recruited Aussie Open (Mark Davis and Kyle Fletcher) to the group. The following month during NJPW Strong's Autumn Attack, TJP betrayed the LA Dojo and joined United Empire as their first Junior Heavyweight member.

Despite Ospreay's absence, both O'Khan and Cobb would enter the tournament in the A and B block respectively. O'Khan would finish in the bottom half of his block, scoring just 8 points, however, Cobb would break records in his block, going undefeated for 8 straight wins, before losing on the final deciders to Kazuchika Okada on Day 18, whom he had traded back and forth wins with over the second half of the year.

==== 2022 ====
At Wrestle Kingdom 16, Ospreay being the previous champion and not directly losing his title, would get a shot at the IWGP World Heavyweight Championship against the winner of Shingo Takagi and Kazuchika Okada on night two, where he would lose to Okada. Both O-Khan and Cobb would also lose their respective matches to Sanada and Tetsuya Naito, respectively. United Empire would take part in the New Japan Cup, where Ospreay, O-Khan, Cobb and Aaron Henare would proceed to the second round with wins over Bushi, Kota Ibushi, Togi Makabe and Yuto Nakashima, respectively. Ibushi was injured at the time and O-Khan would win by forfeit. Ospreay, O-Khan and Cobb would move to the third round with wins over El Phantasmo, Taiji Ishimori and Kosei Fujita, respectively. Henare was eliminated after losing to Sanada. Ospreay and Cobb would qualify for the quarter finals with wins over Yoshi-Hashi and Sanada, respectively while O-Khan would lose to Zack Sabre Jr. Both Ospreay and Cobb were eliminated in the semi-final after losing to Tetsuya Naito and Zack Sabre Jr., respectively. After the New Japan Cup, Ospreay would start scouting the Junior Heavyweight division and at Hyper Battle he would recruit Francesco Akira as the newest member.

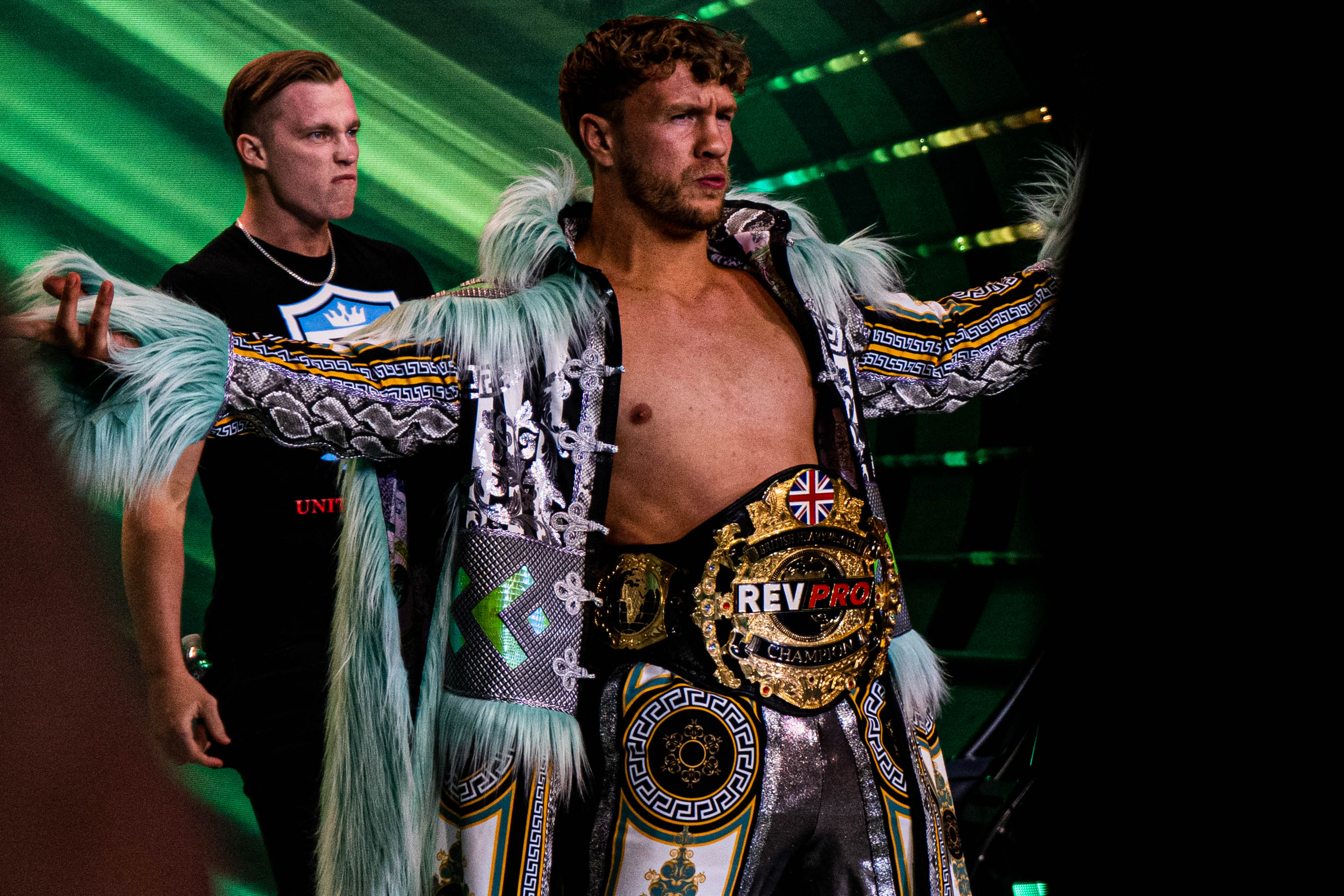
Will Ospreay (right) at AEWxNJPW: Forbidden Door, being accompanied by stablemate Kyle Fletcher (left).

On the May 25th episode of AEW Dynamite, Cobb and O'Khan interrupted the ROH World Tag Team Championship match between, FTR and Roppongi Vice causing a disqualification by attacking both teams, with Cobb returning to All Elite Wrestling for the first time since 2019 and O'Khan making his debut. They raised the titles, indicating the intention of challenging for the championships. The stable returned two weeks later, on the June 8th episode of Dynamite, this time with Ospreay, Henare, Fletcher and Davis making their AEW debuts, attacking Trent Beretta and FTR. Ospreay competed in his first singles match at the June 15th special episode of Dynamite, Road Rager, where he defeated Dax Harwood. After the match Ospreay and United Empire stablemates attacked FTR and Roppongi Vice once more, only to be interrupted by Orange Cassidy, who stared down Ospreay. Soon after a singles match between both men was scheduled for AEW×NJPW: Forbidden Door, for Ospreay's newly won IWGP United States Heavyweight Championship, along with a triple-threat tag-team match, between FTR, Roppongi Vice and O-Khan and Cobb, for the ROH World Tag Team Championships and O-Khan and Cobb's newly won IWGP Tag Team Championships. At the event, Cobb and O-Khan lost the IWGP Heavyweight Tag Team Championships to FTR, yet Will Ospreay retained his IWGP United States Championship against Orange Cassidy. After the match Aussie Open and Ospreay continued to attack Cassidy and Roppongi Vice, however were interrupted by Katsuyori Shibata, who saved Cassidy from the trio.

On the June 19th edition of NJPW Strong Ignition, Aussie Open competed in a tournament to crown the inaugural Strong Openweight Tag Team Championship. In the first round, they defeated The Dark Order's Evil Uno and Alan Angels and they defeated the Stray Dog Army in the semi-finals. In the finals at Strong: High Alert, Davis and Fletcher defeated Christopher Daniels and Yuya Uemura to become the inaugural champions.

On July 27, the AEW World Trios Championship was revealed, with Ospreay and Aussie Open being named as participants in the inaugural tournament. On August 24, Ospreay and Aussie Open defeated Death Triangle to progress to the semifinals, where they were defeated by The Elite on August 31. After the match, United Empire attacked The Elite.

United Empire made their Impact Wrestling debut on the September 8th edition of Impact!, when Aussie Open defeated Bullet Club's Chris Bey and Ace Austin.

==== 2023 and early 2024 ====
On March 26, 2023, at Revolution Rumble, a show promoted by Revolution Pro Wrestling, Dan Moloney defeated United Empire's Akira in singles competition. Immediately following the match, an impressed Will Ospreay appeared and extended Moloney an invitation to join the faction, which was accepted.

Following Catch 2/2's claim of their second IWGP Junior Heavyweight Tag Team Championship on June 4 at Dominion 6.4 in Osaka-jo Hall, the duo was confronted by Bullet Club's Clark Connors. This led to Dan Moloney attacking the duo from behind, betraying United Empire and joining Connors in Bullet Club. In July 2023, Ospreay introduced his student and protege Callum Newman into the stable and NJPW.

On 11 February at The New Beginning in Osaka, United Empire was defeated by Bullet Club War Dogs, in the 10-man steel cage match. After the match, Ospreay thanked the NJPW fans and promised to return to the promotion one day, before embracing with his United Empire stablemates in the ring. This marked Ospreay's final appearance for the promotion as a NJPW talent and ending his tenure as leader of the United Empire, though he would still represent the stable in AEW.

==== Expansion into All Elite Wrestling and Ring of Honor ====
On May 24, 2023, AEW owner Tony Khan announced that both Fletcher and Davis had signed contracts joining AEW. This would officially bring the faction to AEW. Ospreay would be announced to sign with the promotion several months later. During their tenure in AEW, Ospreay and Fletcher were also part of The Don Callis Family, but would still represent the United Empire in AEW. On July 21, 2023, Aussie Open won the ROH World Tag Team Championships at Ring of Honor's Death Before Dishonor in a Four-way tag team match, marking the first ROH championship for the duo and the Empire. On the Zero-Hour of All In, Aussie Open lost the ROH World Tag Team Titles to Adam Cole and MJF, ending their reign at 37 days. In October 2023, it was revealed that Davis had suffered a wrist injury and would be out of action, putting Aussie Open on hiatus. On 15 December at Final Battle, Fletcher won a Survival of the Fittest to win the vacant ROH World Television Championship, thus making it his first ever singles championship. At Consejo Mundial de Lucha Libre (CMLL)'s event Viernes Espectacular, Fletcher lost his ROH World Television Championship to Atlantis Jr..

On May 26, 2024 at Double or Nothing, Ospreay defeated Roderick Strong to win the AEW International Championship, marking the first AEW championship victory for both himself and the Empire. On the September 11 episode of Dynamite, Fletcher teamed with Ospreay as the United Empire to win a tag team Casino Gauntlet match to earn a shot at The Young Bucks' AEW World Tag Team Championships at Grand Slam on September 25, though they failed to win the titles at the event. On October 12 at WrestleDream, Fletcher betrayed Ospreay by helping Don Callis Family member Konosuke Takeshita defeat both Ospreay and Ricochet for the International Championship, officially putting an end to any dual associations between the Don Callis Family and United Empire. On October 30 at Fright Night Dynamite, Davis returned to AEW after a year off following a wrist injury, confronting Fletcher over his treacherous actions. On the February 5, 2025 episode of Dynamite, Davis was revealed as the newest member of the Don Callis Family, abandoning the Empire in the process.

=== TJP's leadership (2024–2025) ===
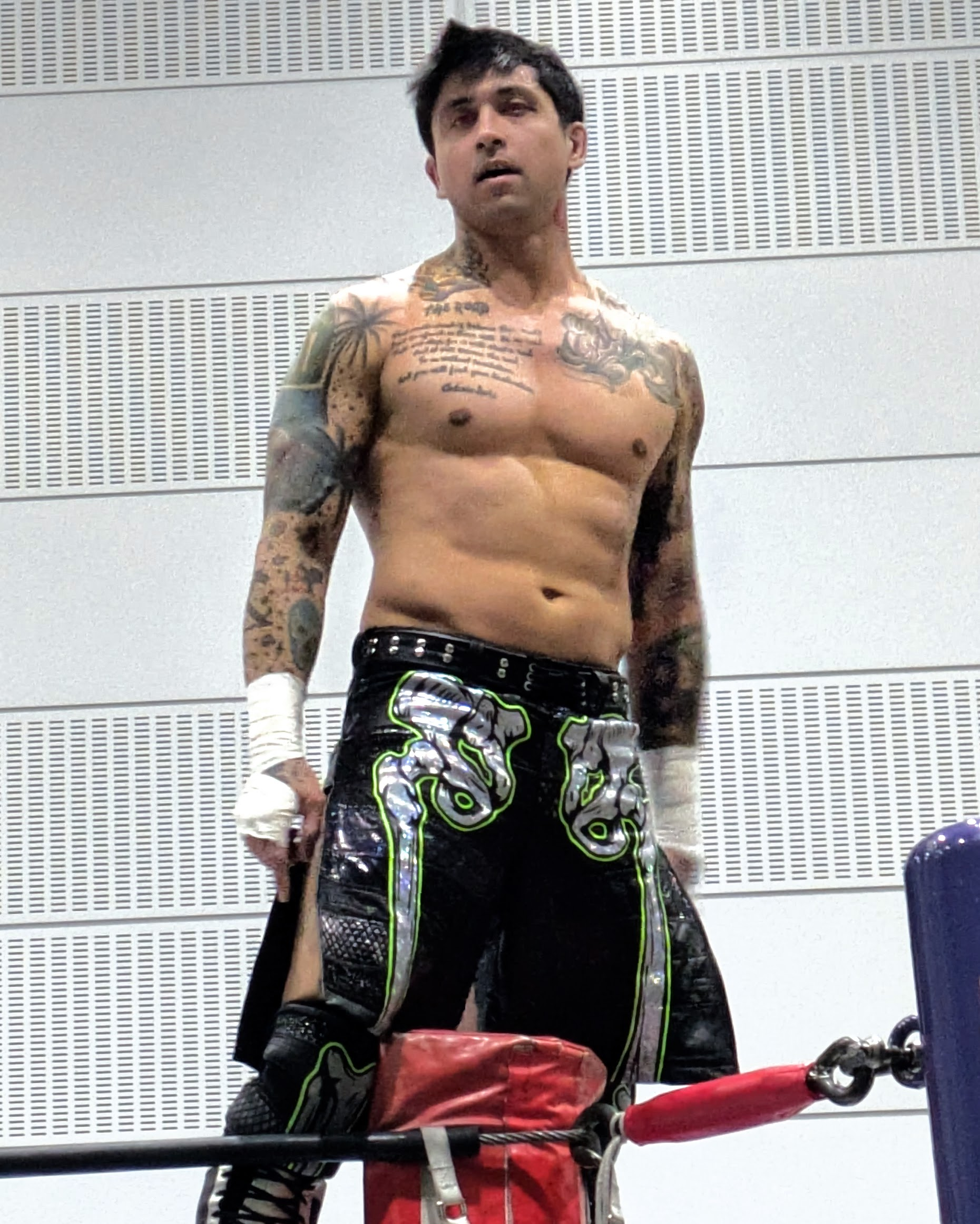
T. J. Perkins, the stable's second leader from April 2024 to April 2025

On March 12, 2024, following Ospreay completing his full-time NJPW duties and going to AEW, TJP claimed himself as leader the NJPW branch of United Empire, but would be pushed back by Great-O-Khan due to the stable losing. On April 22 however, after defeating Just 5 Guys in a gauntlet match, the remaining members fully accepted TJP as the new leader of United Empire.

On April 27, O-Khan lost the Provisional KOPW Championship to Yuya Uemura. On May 3 at Wrestling Dontaku: Night 1, Cobb defeated Zack Sabre Jr. to win the NJPW World Television Championship. On June 9 at Dominion 6.9 in Osaka-jo Hall, O-Khan defeated Uemura in a Storm Catch Rules match to regain the provisional KOPW Championship. On June 16, Henare defeated Shingo Takagi to win the NEVER Openweight Championship. On the July 3 episode of Dynamite, Ospreay left the Don Callis Family and successfully defended his International Championship against Daniel Garcia. Despite leaving The Don Callis Family, Ospreay remained aligned with Kyle Fletcher, maintaining the links between the two factions.

From July 20 and August 14, four members of United Empire took part in the 2024 G1 Climax, with only O-Khan managing to advance from his group to the A block play-off match, where he was defeated by Shingo Takagi on August 15. Five days later, Jakob Austin Young was announced as the stable's newest member. On September 29 at Destruction in Kobe, Henare lost the NEVER Openweight Championship to Shingo Takagi after initially winning it from him back in January. On October 14 at King of Pro-Wrestling, Cobb lost the NJPW World Television Championship to Ren Narita in a three-way match, also involving Yota Tsuji.

From October 24 to November 2, Akira and TJP took part in the 2024 Super Jr. Tag League, finishing the tournament with a record three wins and two losses, advancing to the finals.On November 4 at Power Struggle, Henare and O-Khan defeated TMDK's Mikey Nicholls and Shane Haste to win the IWGP Tag Team Championship. Later that night, Akira and TJP were defeated by Kosei Fujita and Robbie Eagles also of TMDK, in the finals of the 2024 Super Jr. Tag League. On the November 6 episode of Dynamite, Aussie Open officially disbanded after Fletcher attempted to attack Davis, only to be chased off by Ospreay. On December 6, it was announced that the IWGP Tag Team Championship would be vacated, due to Henare suffering a right knee injury. On December 9, Templario was invited into the stable by TJP, which he accepted, becoming the stable's eighth homebase member.

=== Callum Newman's leadership (2025–present) ===
Callum Newman, the stable's third and current leader since April 2025

==== 2025 ====
On April 5, at Sakura Genesis, O-Khan defeated El Phantasmo to win the NJPW World Television Championship. At the event, Cobb and Newman defeated Tetsuya Naito and Hiromu Takahashi to win the IWGP Tag Team Championship. They vacated the titles on April 9, due to Cobb leaving NJPW. In a press conference that same day, Newman challenged Hirooki Goto to a title match for the IWGP World Heavyweight Championship at Wrestling Dontaku. Newman also announced in the same press conference that he would take over the leadership of United Empire as TJP had become a freelancer with NJPW after his contract expired, though TJP remained a member of United Empire. On April 26, at Wrestling Redzone in Hiroshima, Newman and O-Khan defeated Bishamon (Goto and Yoshi-Hashi) to win the vacant IWGP Tag Team Championship. At Wrestling Dontaku, Newman lost the title match to Goto. At Resurgence, TJP and Templario defeated World Class Wrecking Crew (Jorel Nelson and Royce Isaacs) to win the Strong Openweight Tag Team Championship. At Dominion 6.15 in Osaka-jo Hall on June 15, Newman and O-Khan lost the IWGP Tag Team Championship to Taichi and Tomohiro Ishii. Newman and O-Khan both participated in the 2025 G1 Climax, with both men failing to advance out of their blocks (A and B respectively) and finishing with records of 4–5 respectively. On September 13 at MLW Fightland, Templario defeated Ikuro Kwon to win the MLW World Middleweight Championship, marking his first major title outside of Mexico. From October 23 till November 2, Templario and Jakob Austin Young participated in the 2025 Super Junior Tag League, finishing with a record of 2–3 in Block A and failing to qualify for the finals.

After King of Pro-Wrestling, the United Empire began to feud with the newborn alliance between Bullet Club War Dogs and Unaffiliated (composed by the former member of Los Ingobernables de Japon), as Newman started developing a more vicious and aggressive attitude in his rivalry with War Dogs leader David Finlay, blaming him for the United Empire downfall after Ospreay left. At Hiroshi Tanahashi Final Homecoming on November 2, Newman, O-Khan, Jakob, and Templario defeated Shingo Takagi, Clark Connors, Oskar, and Yuto-Ice in an eight-man tag team match. On November 14, 2025 at CMLL Viernes Espectacular, TJP and Templario lost the Strong Openweight Tag team Championship to Los Hermanos Chavez (Ángel de Oro and Niebla Roja), marking TJP's final appearance as part of United Empire. During the Road to Tokyo Dome tour, on December 14, Newman challenged Finlay and the War Dogs and Unaffiliated members to a ten-men tag match at Wrestle Kingdom 20, claiming that himself, O-Khan and the returning Henare would be accompanied by other two mysterious partners. On December 22, Andrade El Ídolo, made his first appearance for NJPW since 2015 in a pre-taped video, revealing himself as the newest member of the United Empire and one of the two mystery wrestlers.

==== 2026 ====
At Wrestle Kingdom 20 on January 4, 2026, Jake Lee was revealed as the second mystery partner and subsequently joined the United Empire, leaving the War Dogs in the process. United Empire went on to defeat Finlay, Gabe Kidd and Drilla Moloney, Shingo Takagi, and Hiromu Takahashi; post-match, Akira made his NJPW return after 7 months as United Empire fully turned heel, beating down their defeated opponents. During the Road to the New Beginning tour on January 19, Newman interfered in a Young Lion Cup match between Daiki Nagai and Zane Jay and offered a steel chair to Jay, which Jay accepted, proceeding to hit it over Nagai's head, turning heel and joining the United Empire. On January 29 at MLW Battle Riot VIII, Templario lost the MLW World Middleweight Championship to Kushida. At The New Beginning in Osaka on February 11, Jake Lee failed to win the IWGP Heavyweight Championship from Yota Tsuji. In March, Newman won New Japan Cup after he defeated Yuya Uemura in the finals. On April 2 at Road to Sakura Genesis: Night 5, Akira and Young failed to defeat Taiji Ishimori and Robbie X for the IWGP Junior Heavyweight Tag Team Championship. On April 4 at Sakura Genesis, Ospreay, Henare and O-Khan defeated Yuya Uemura, Taichi and El Desperado in what was Ospreay's first NJPW match since originally leaving the company in 2024, and Newman defeated Yota Tsuji to win the IWGP Heavyweight Championship, becoming the youngest wrestler to hold the title. At Wrestling Dontaku, Andrade defeated Yota Tsuji to win the IWGP Global Heavyweight Championship on Night 1, while on Night 2, Ospreay, O-Khan, and Henare won the NEVER Openweight 6-Man Tag Team Championship. On June 14 at Dominion 6.14 in Osaka-jo Hall, Henare and O-Khan defeated Knock Out Brothers (Yuto-Ice and Oskar) to win the IWGP Tag Team Championship, while Andrade and Newman lost their titles. On October 6 during the Road to King of Pro-Wrestling tour, Henare and O-Khan lost the IWGP Tag Team Championship back to the Knock Out Brothers, ending their reign at 114 days. On October 12 at King of Pro-Wrestling, Ospreay, Henare, and O-Khan lost the NEVER Openweight Six-Man Tag Team Championship to Unbound Co. (Yuto-Ice, Oskar, and Jeff Cobb), ending their reign at 161 days. On November 3 at Power Struggle, Ospreay and Newman failed to win back the IWGP Tag Team Championship from Knock Out Brothers after Newman attacked Oskar with a chair; post-match, Ospreay and Newman brawled after months of tension before Newman challenged Ospreay to a match at Wrestle Kingdom 21. Due to the feud between Ospreay and Newman, the United Empire became divided, with the American branch plus Henare and Akira remaining loyal to Ospreay, while remaining Japanse branch members (barring Templario) Jay, Young, and Lee sided with Newman. O-Khan, meanwhile, distanced himself from the stable.

==== Formation of United Empire in AEW ====
Meanwhile, on the April 8, 2026 episode of AEW Dynamite, Newman, Henare, and Akira assisted Ospreay during his feud against the Death Riders, defeating them in a Chaos in Canada match. Between May and September, Ospreay won the 2026 Owen Hart Cup and the AEW World Championship. while Andrade El Idolo, who joined both the Don Callis Family in AEW and United Empire in NJPW in late 2025, betrayed the Don Callis Family and won the AEW National Championship. On the September 2 episode of Dynamite, Ospreay announced that he would be starting a branch of the United Empire in AEW, officially dividing the stable into two contingents with one in Japan and one in America with Ospreay leading the latter. The American branch also included "Speedball" Mike Bailey and the reigning AEW Women's World Tag Team Champions the Brawling Birds (Alex Windsor and Jamie Hayter). On November 7 at Chris Jericho's Rock 'N' Wrestling Rager at Sea – Seventh Cruise of a Seventh Cruise, Andrade lost the National Championship to Tommaso Ciampa, ending his reign at 104 days. On November 14 at Full Gear, the Brawling Birds lost the AEW Women’s World Tag Team Championship to Wrathlander (Harley Cameron and Kris Statlander), ending their reign at 76 days.

== Members ==
*	Founding member
I-III	Leader(s)
M	Manager

=== Current ===
==== Japanese contingent ====
This branch of the stable primarily performs in Japan with NJPW, while also making sporadic appearances in AEW.

United Empire (Japan)
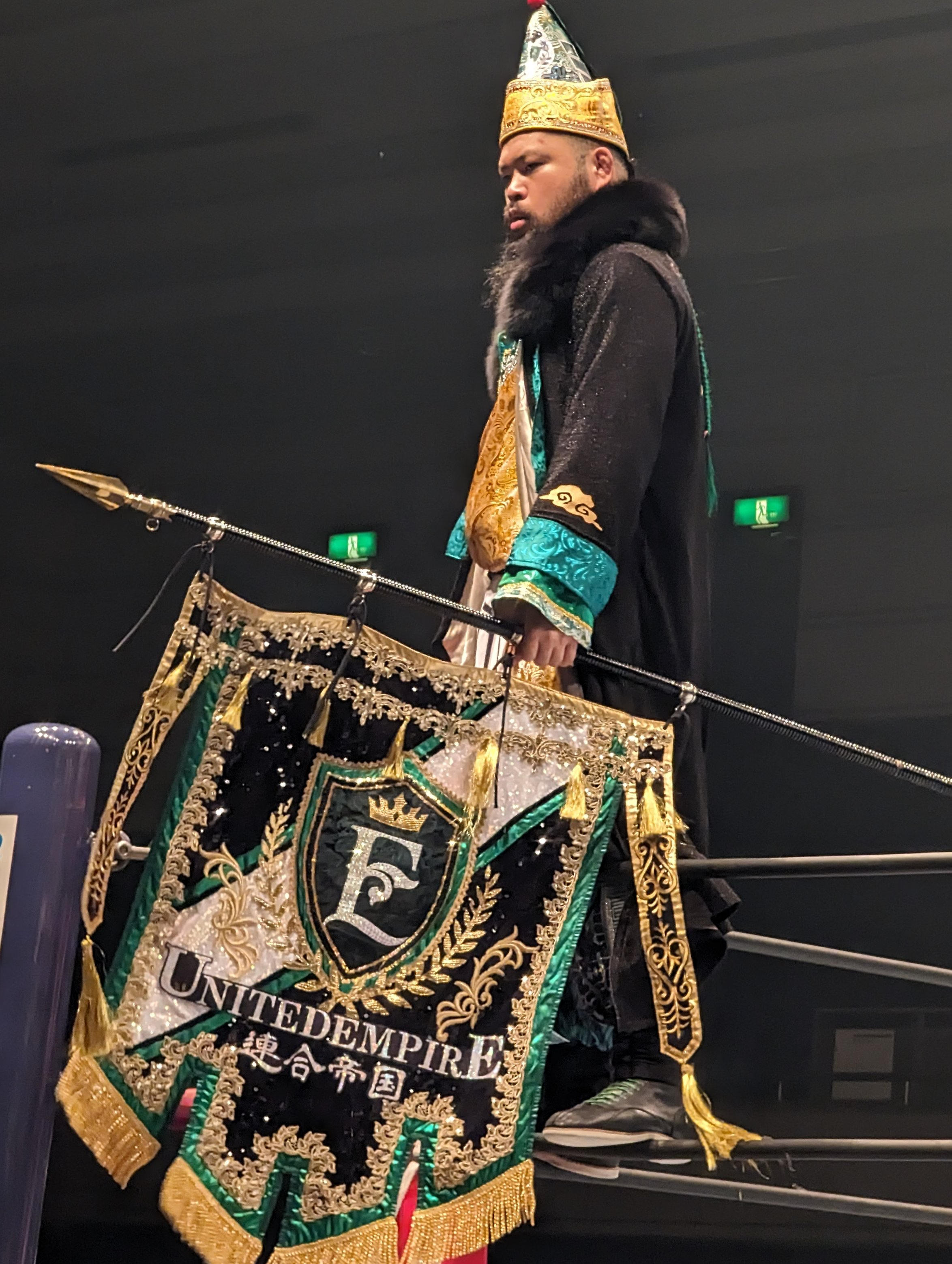
Great-O-Khan (*)

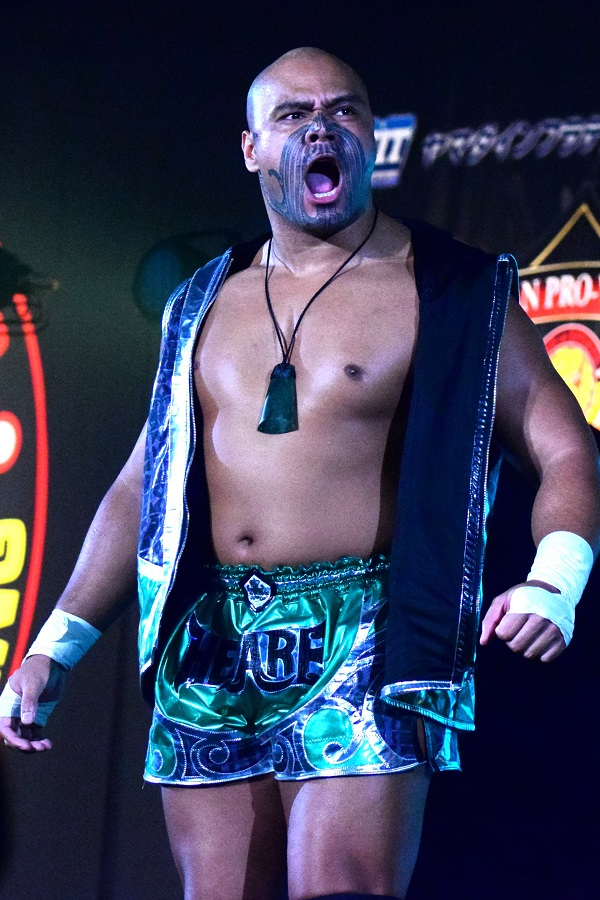
Henare

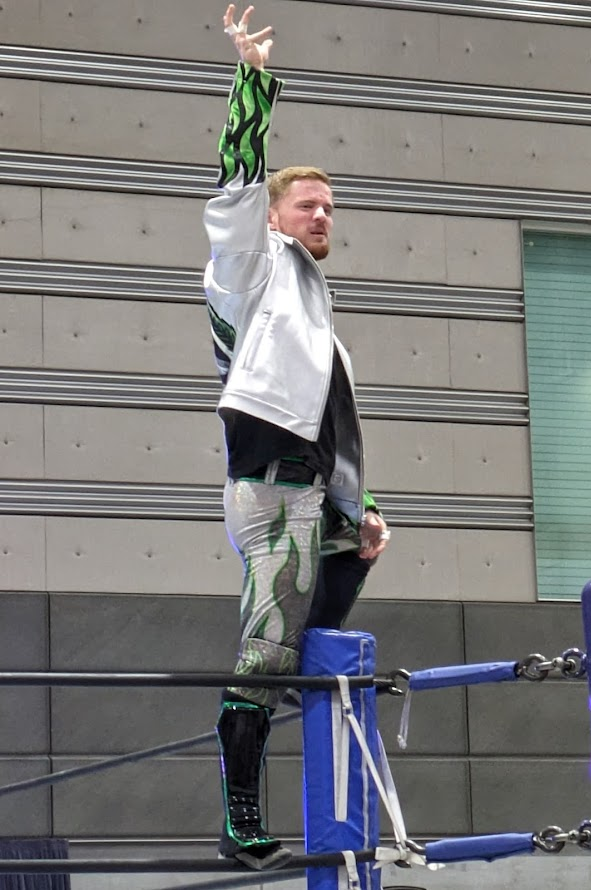
Francesco Akira

Callum Newman (III)

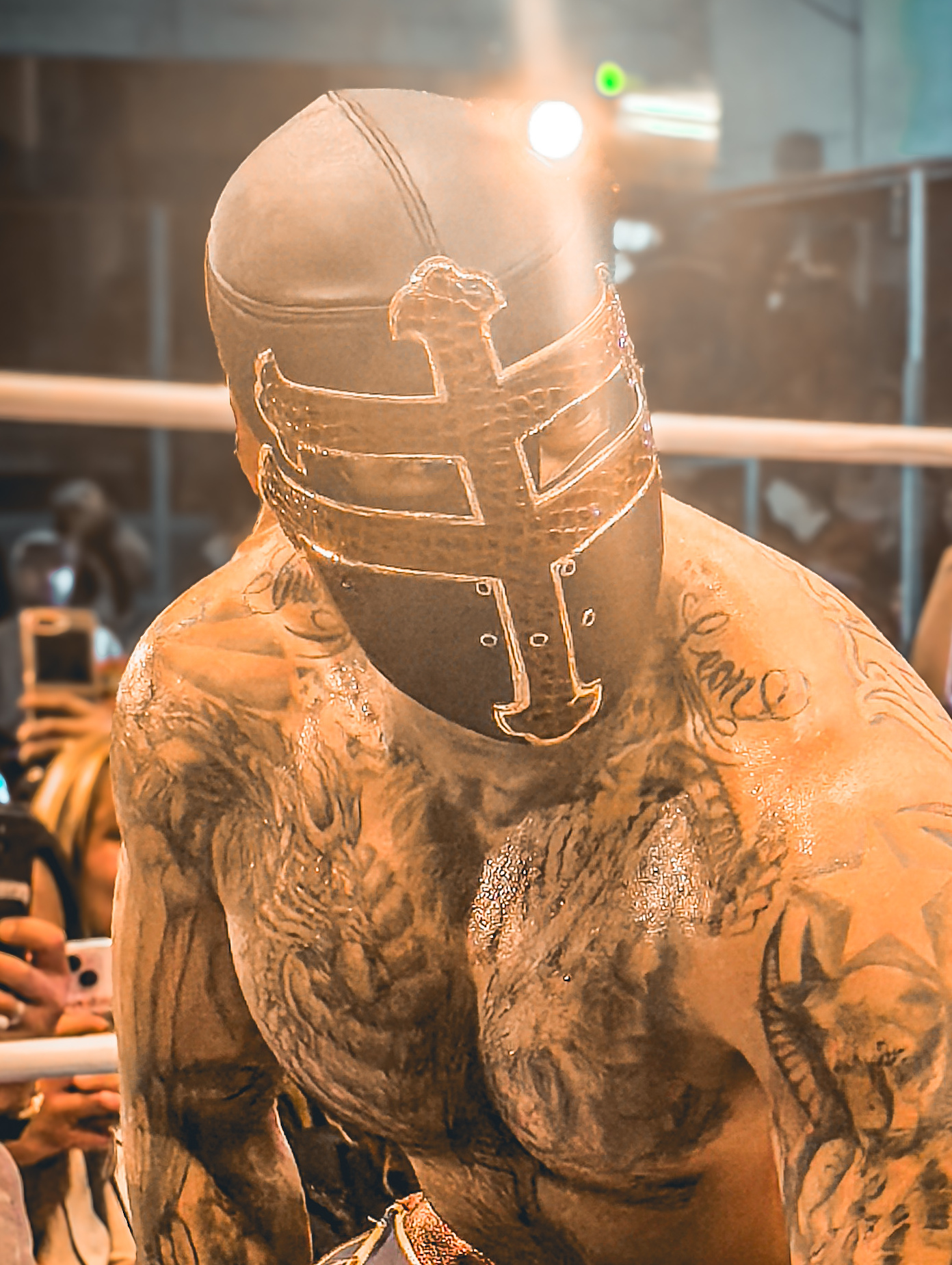
Templario

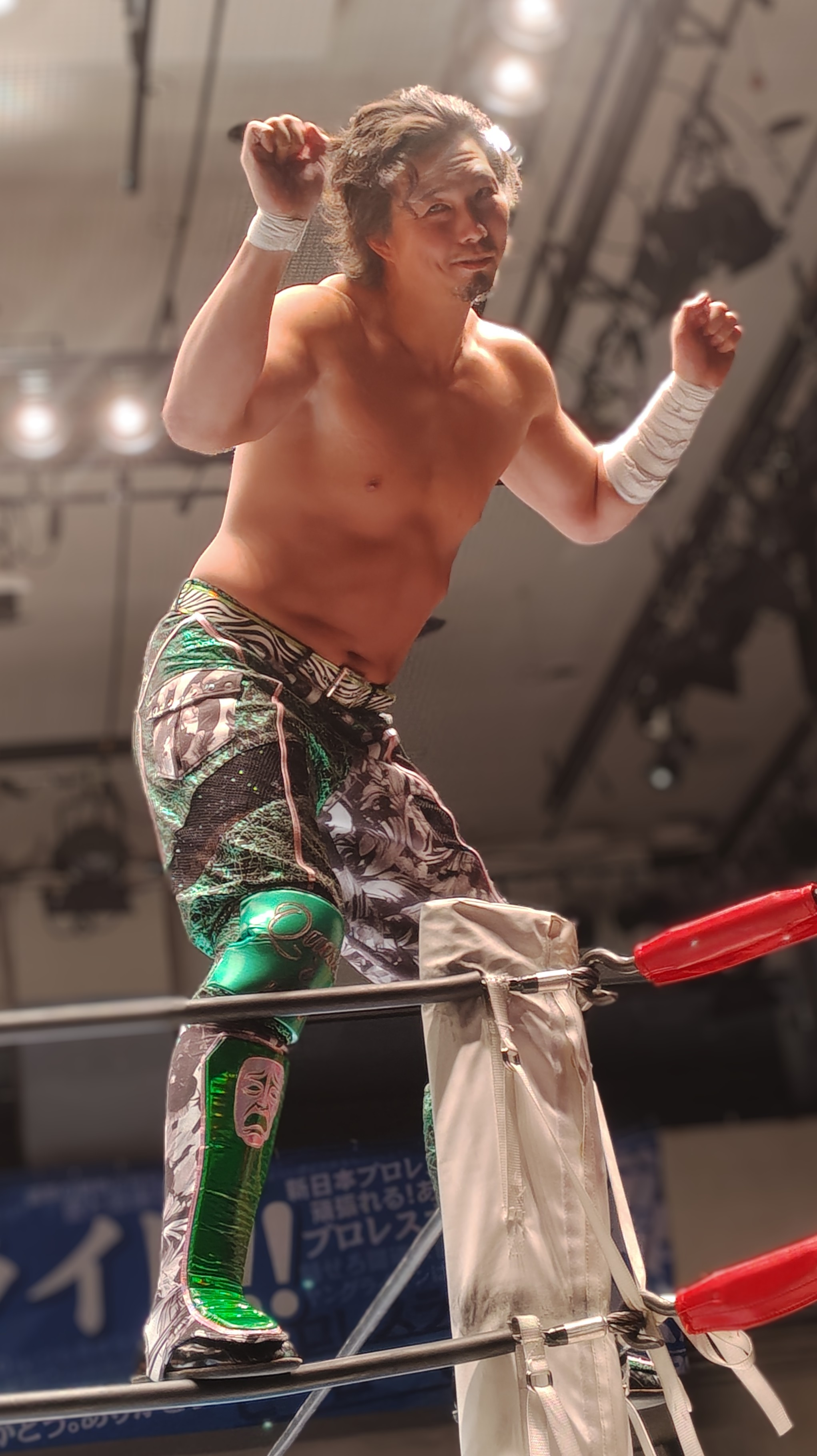
Jake Lee

Member			Joined
(Japan)	Great-O-Khan	*	October 16, 2020
(New Zealand)	Henare		April 4, 2021
(Italy)	Francesco Akira		April 9, 2022
(England)	Callum Newman	III	June 18, 2023
(United States)	Jakob Austin Young		August 20, 2024
(Mexico)	Templario (Note: Templario represents the stable in Mexico through his affiliation with New Japan Pro Wrestling and its cross-promotional partnership with Templario's parent company Consejo Mundial de Lucha Libre.)		December 10, 2024
(Japan) (South Korea)	Jake Lee		January 4, 2026
(United States)	Zane Jay		January 19, 2026

==== American contingent ====
This branch of the stable primarily performs in the United States with AEW, while also making sporadic appearances in NJPW.

United Empire (USA)
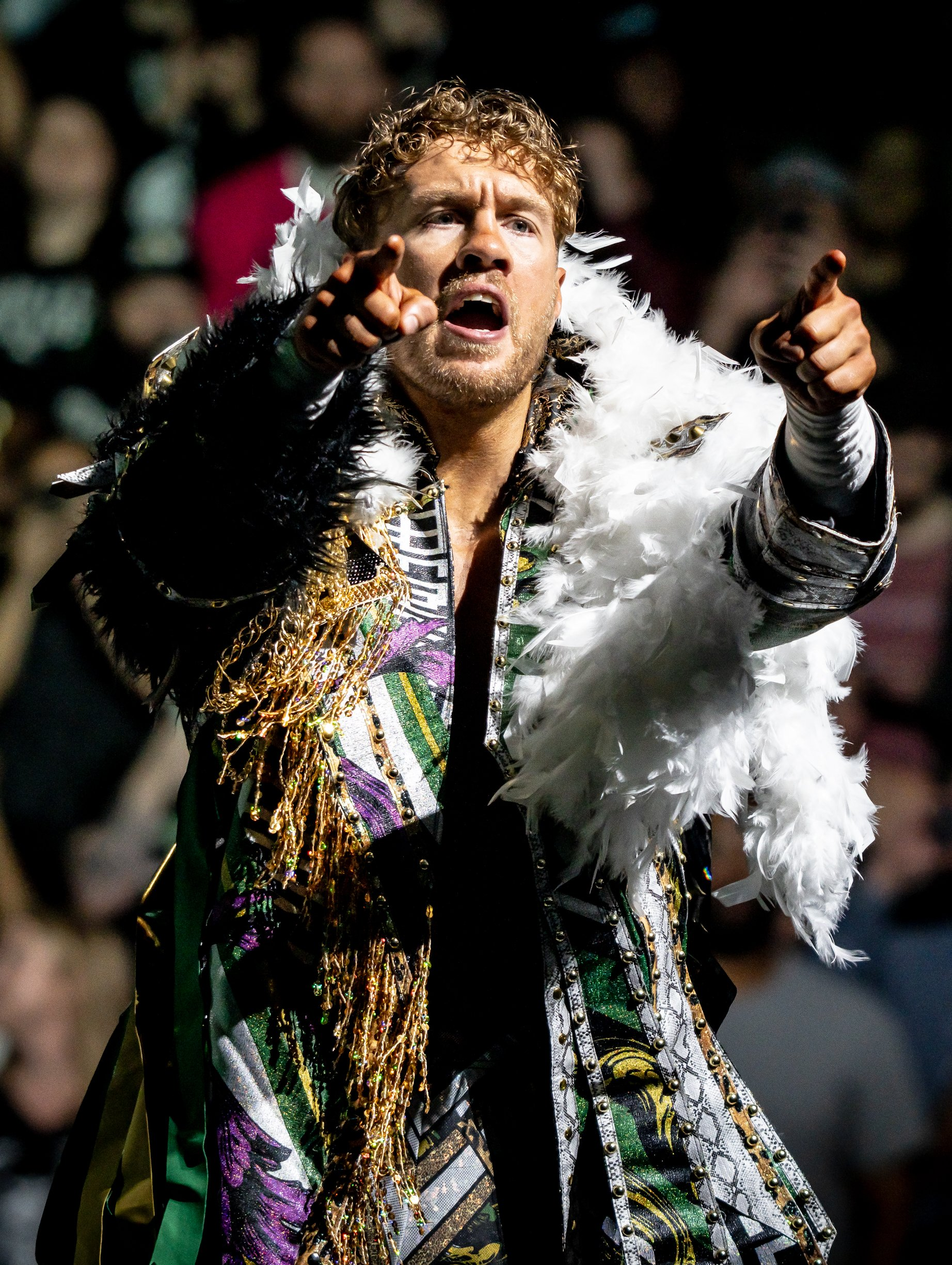
Will Ospreay (*/I)

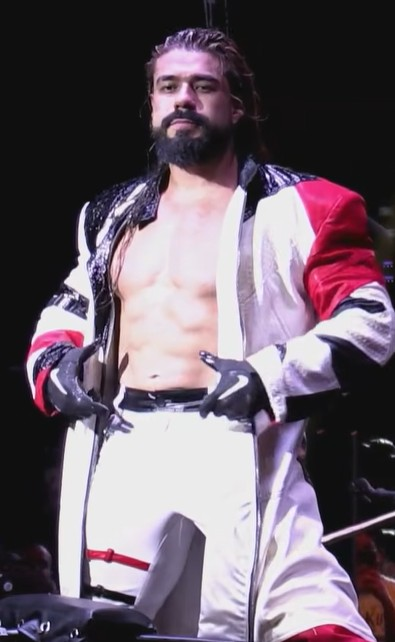
Andrade El Ídolo

Mike Bailey

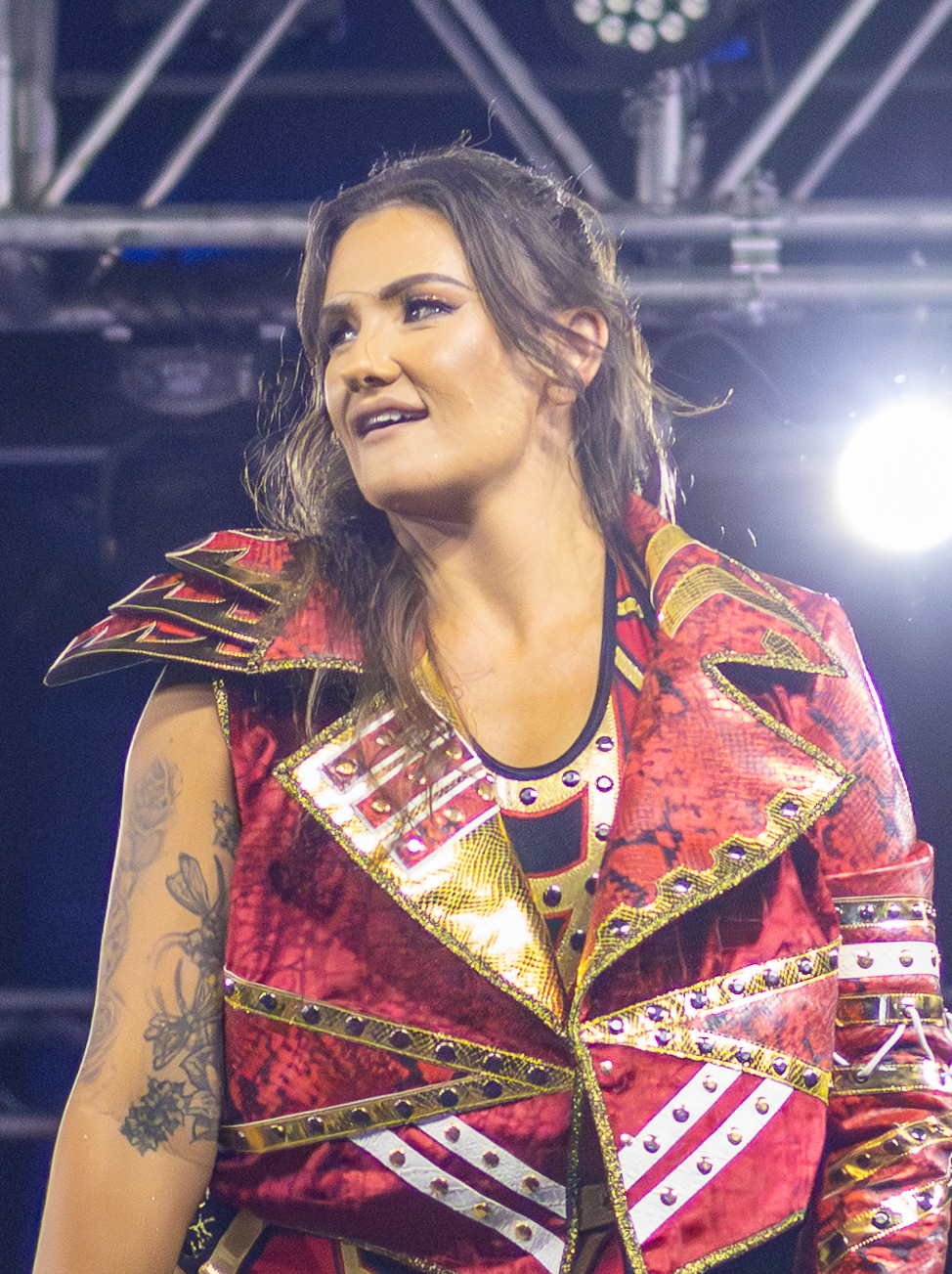
Alex Windsor

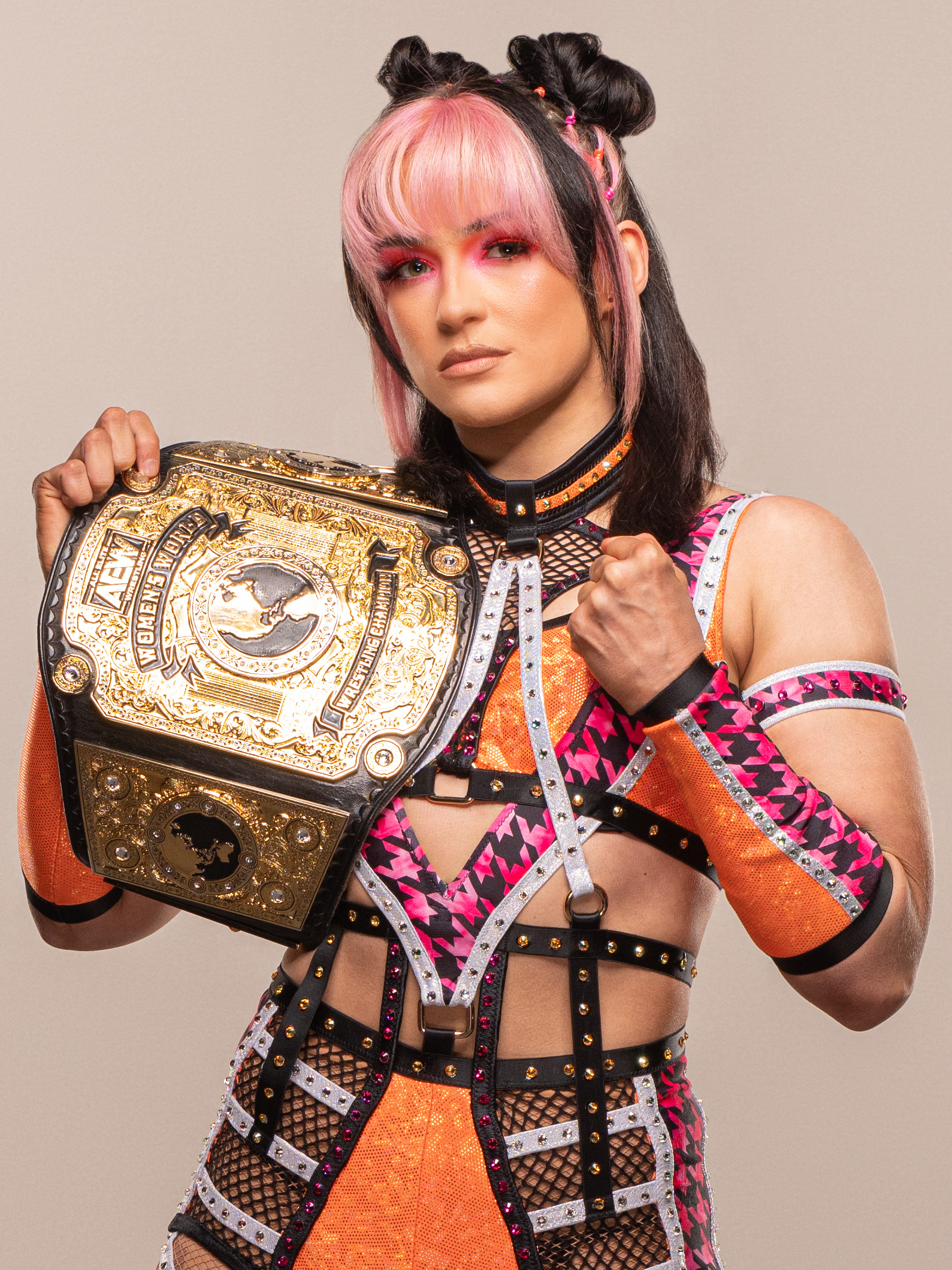
Jamie Hayter

Member			Joined
(England)	Will Ospreay (Note: From October 16, 2020 to February 11, 2024, Ospreay served as the leader of the NJPW branch. As of September 2, 2026, Ospreay serves as the leader of the AEW branch.)	*I	October 16, 2020
(Mexico)	Andrade El Ídolo		December 22, 2025
(Canada)	Mike Bailey		September 23, 2026
(England)	Alex Windsor		September 26, 2026
(England)	Jamie Hayter		September 26, 2026

=== Former ===
Member			Joined	Left
(England)	Bea Priestley	*	October 16, 2020	March 21, 2021
(England)	Gideon Grey	M	August 22, 2022	November 20, 2022
(England)	Dan Moloney		March 26, 2023	June 4, 2023
(Australia)	Kyle Fletcher		September 19, 2021	October 12, 2024
(Australia)	Mark Davis		September 19, 2021	February 5, 2025
(United States)	Jeff Cobb		November 15, 2020	April 19, 2025
(United States) (Philippines)	TJP	II	September 25, 2021	November 14, 2025 (Note: TJP never officially left the group. This date marks his last appearance as a member.)

== Sub-groups ==
=== Current ===
Affiliate	Members	Tenure	Type
The Brawling Birds	Jamie Hayter; Alex Windsor	2026–present	Tag team

=== Former ===
Affiliate	Members	Tenure	Type
Aussie Open	Kyle Fletcher; Mark Davis	2021–2024	Tag team
Catch 2/2	TJP; Francesco Akira	2022–2025	Tag team

== Championships and accomplishments ==
- All Elite Wrestling
  - AEW World Championship (1 time, current) – Ospreay
  - AEW National Championship (1 time) – Andrade
  - AEW International Championship (2 times) – Ospreay
  - AEW Women's World Tag Team Championship (1 time) – Hayter and Windsor
  - Owen Hart Cup (2026) – Ospreay
- Aotearoa Wrestling
  - Undisputed Aotearoa New Zealand Heavyweight Championship (1 time, current) – Henare
- Consejo Mundial de Lucha Libre
  - CMLL World Middleweight Championship (1 time, current) – Templario
- Filipino Pro Wrestling
  - FPW Championship (1 time) – Cobb
- German Wrestling Federation
  - GWF World Championship (1 time) – Andrade
- Relentless Wrestling
  - Relentless Heavyweight Championship (2 times) – TJP
- Major League Wrestling
  - MLW World Middleweight Championship (2 times, current) – Templario
- New Japan Pro-Wrestling
  - IWGP Heavyweight Championship (2 times) – Ospreay (1) (Note: During Ospreay's reign, the title was called the IWGP World Heavyweight Championship.) and Newman (1)
  - IWGP Global Heavyweight Championship (1 time) – Andrade
  - IWGP United States/United Kingdom Heavyweight Championship (2 times, final) – Ospreay
  - IWGP Intercontinental Championship (1 time) – Ospreay (Note: With the reactivation of the IWGP Heavyweight Championship and the restored and combined histories of both it, the World Heavyweight, and the Intercontinental titles, all former IWGP World Heavyweight Champions are retroactively recognized as having been an IWGP Intercontinental Champion.)
  - NJPW World Television Championship (2 times) – Cobb (1) and O-Khan (1)
  - IWGP Tag Team Championship (7 times) – O-Khan and Cobb (2), Fletcher and Davis (1), O-Khan and Henare (2), Newman and Cobb (1), Newman and O-Khan (1)
  - NEVER Openweight 6-Man Tag Team Championship (1 time) – Ospreay, O-Khan, and Henare
  - IWGP Junior Heavyweight Tag Team Championship (3 times) – TJP and Akira
  - KOPW Provisional Championship (2 times) – O-Khan
  - New Japan Cup (2 times)
    - (2021) – Ospreay
    - (2026) – Newman
  - NEVER Openweight Championship (1 time) – Henare
  - Super Junior Tag League (2023) – TJP and Akira
  - Strong Women's Championship (1 time, current) - Windsor
  - Strong Openweight Tag Team Championship (3 times) – Fletcher and Davis (2), TJP and Templario (1)
  - Inaugural Strong Openweight Tag Team Championship Tournament (2022) – Fletcher and Davis
  - Fifth NJPW Triple Crown Champion – Ospreay
  - Third NJPW Grand Slam Champion – Ospreay
- New Tradition Lucha Libre
  - NTLL Gladiator Championship (1 time) – TJP
- One Pro Wrestling
  - 1PW Heavyweight Championship (1 time) – Ospreay
- Pro Wrestling Illustrated
  - Singles wrestlers
    - Ranked Ospreay No. 7 of the top 500 singles wrestlers in the PWI 500 of 2021
    - Ranked TJP No. 91 of the top 500 singles wrestlers in the PWI 500 of 2021
    - Ranked Cobb No. 139 of the top 500 singles wrestlers in the PWI 500 of 2021
    - Ranked O-Khan No. 157 of the top 500 singles wrestlers in the PWI 500 of 2021
    - Ranked Fletcher No. 188 of the top 500 singles wrestlers in the PWI 500 of 2023
    - Ranked Akira No. 264 of the top 500 singles wrestlers in the PWI 500 of 2022
    - Ranked Henare No. 449 of the top 500 singles wrestlers in the PWI 500 of 2023
    - Ranked Templario No. 121 of the top 500 singles wrestlers in the PWI 500 of 2025.
    - Ranked Callum Newman No. 14 of the top 500 singles wrestlers in the PWI 500 of 2026.
  - Tag teams
    - Ranked Kyle Fletcher and Mark Davis No. 11 of the top 100 tag teams in the PWI Tag Team 100 of 2022
    - Ranked Great-O-Khan and Jeff Cobb No. 12 of the top 100 tag teams in the PWI Tag Team 100 of 2022
    - Ranked TJP and Francesco Akira No. 22 of the top 100 tag teams in the PWI Tag Team 100 of 2022
- PWA Black Label
  - PWA Tag Team Championship (1 time) – Fletcher and Davis
- Revolution Pro Wrestling
  - British Heavyweight Championship (2 times) – Ospreay (1), O-Khan (1)
  - British Tag Team Championship (2 times) – O-Khan with Rampage Brown (1), Fletcher and Davis (1)
- Ring of Honor
  - ROH World Tag Team Championship (1 time) – Fletcher and Davis
  - ROH World Television Championship (1 time) – Fletcher
- The Crash Lucha Libre
  - The Crash Heavyweight Championship (1 time) – Andrade
- Tokyo Sports
  - Best Bout Award (2022) – Ospreay vs. Kazuchika Okada on August 18
  - Technique Award (2021) – O-Khan
  - Fighting Spirit Award (2022) – O-Khan
  - Best Tag Team Award (2022) – O-Khan and Cobb
- Warrior Wrestling
  - Warrior Wrestling Championship (1 time) – Ospreay
- World Series Wrestling
  - WSW Australian Championship (1 time) – TJP
  - WSW Tag Team Championship (1 time) – Henare and Andrade
- World Wrestling Council
  - WWC Universal Heavyweight Championship (1 time) – Andrade
- World Wonder Ring Stardom
  - SWA World Championship (1 time) – Priestley
- Wrestling Knockout Chile
  - WKC Championship (1 time, current) – Andrade
