= IWGP Junior Heavyweight Championship =

Professional wrestling championship

- The IWGP Junior Heavyweight Championship belt

Details
- Promotion: New Japan Pro-Wrestling (NJPW)
- Date established: February 6, 1986
- Current champion: Yoh
- Date won: June 14, 2026

Other names
- IWGP Junior Heavyweight Championship (1986–present); IWGP Jr. Heavyweight Championship
Statistics
- First champion: Shiro Koshinaka
- Most reigns: Jushin Thunder Liger (11 reigns)
- Longest reign: Jushin Thunder Liger (sixth reign, 628 days)
- Shortest reign: Juventud Guerrera (first reign, 7 days)
- Oldest champion: El Desperado (41 years and 6 days)
- Youngest champion: Black Tiger (IV) (22 years, 11 months and 10 days)

The IWGP Junior Heavyweight Championship (IWGPジュニアヘビー級王座, IWGP juniahebī-kyū ōza) is a professional wrestling world junior heavyweight championship owned by the New Japan Pro-Wrestling (NJPW) promotion. "IWGP" is the acronym of NJPW's governing body, the International Wrestling Grand Prix (インターナショナル・レスリング・グラン・プリ, intānashonaru resuringu guran puri). Only wrestlers under the junior heavyweight weight-limit may hold the championship. NJPW currently controls two junior heavyweight championships: the IWGP Junior Heavyweight Championship and the IWGP Junior Heavyweight Tag Team Championship. The weight-limit for the title is 100 kg (220 lb). The current champion is Yoh, who is in his first reign. He won the title by defeating Douki at Dominion 6.14 in Osaka-jo Hall in Osaka, Japan, on June 14, 2026.

== History ==
The title was introduced on February 6, 1986, at a NJPW show.

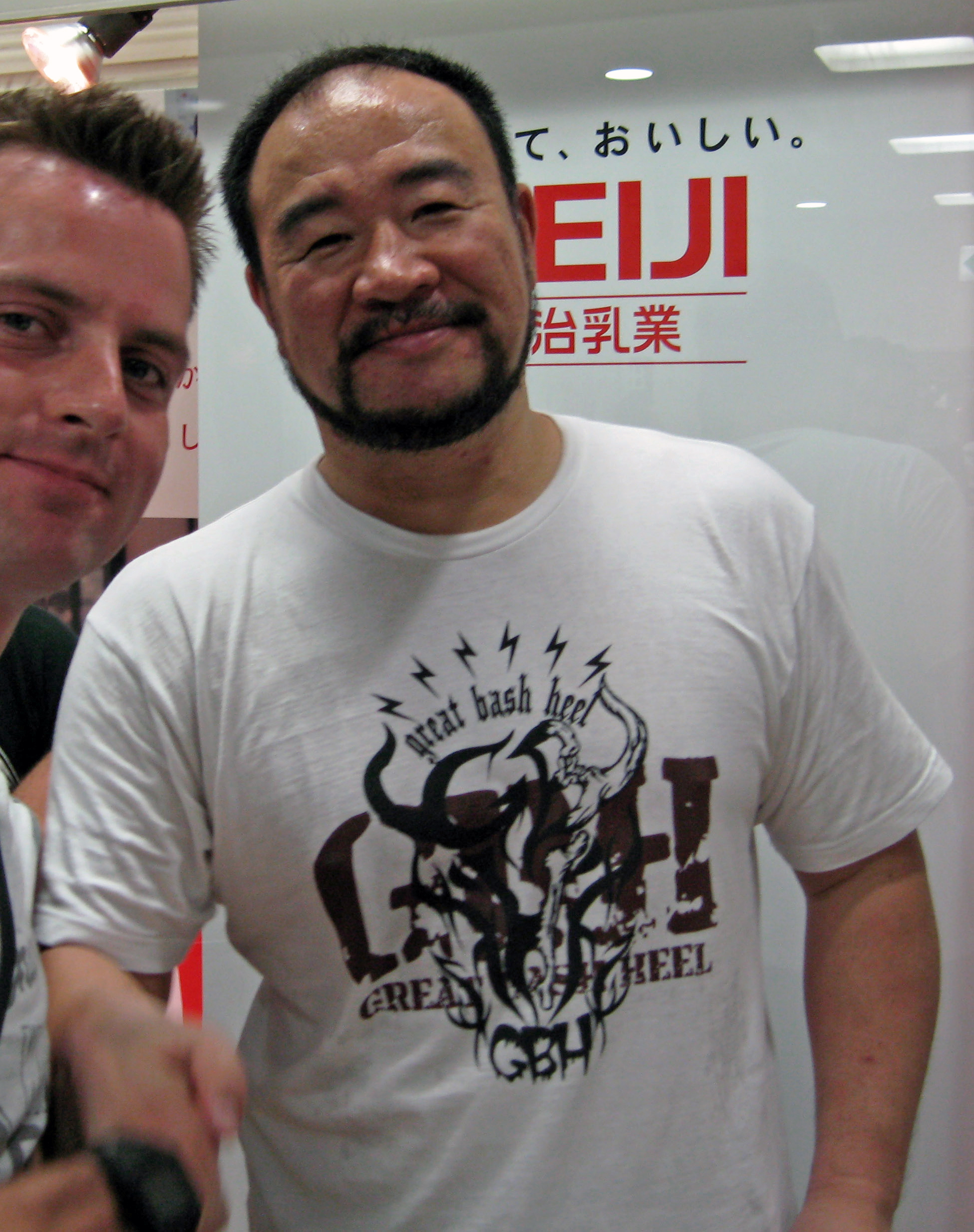
Inaugural and three-time champion Shiro Koshinaka

From August 5, 1996, until November 5, 1997, the title was part of the J-Crown, or J-Crown Octuple Unified Championship. The J-Crown was an assembly of eight different championships from several different promotions. It was created on August 5, 1996, when The Great Sasuke won an eight-man tournament. The IWGP Junior Heavyweight Championship, the British Commonwealth Junior Heavyweight Championship, the NWA World Junior Heavyweight Championship, the NWA World Welterweight Championship, the UWA World Junior Light Heavyweight Championship, the WAR International Junior Heavyweight Championship, the WWA World Junior Light Heavyweight Championship, and the WWF Light Heavyweight Championship were the eight championships that were involved. On November 5, 1997, then-champion Shinjiro Otani vacated all J-Crown belts but the IWGP Junior Heavyweight Championship after the World Wrestling Federation (WWF) retook control of its Light Heavyweight title, effectively ending the J-Crown.

On November 12, 2023, the title belt itself became a champion during DDT's Ultimate Party 2023 event, by winning the company's comedic Ironman Heavymetalweight Championship, which is defended under a 24/7 rule: during the event, Hiromu Takahashi, who was both IWGP Junior Heavyweight Champion and Ironman Heavymetalweight Champion, successfully defended the latter title against Kazuki Hirata before laying in the ring. Because the Junior Heavyweight Championship belt was on Takahashi's chest when he did so, the referee counted this as a pinfall and declared the belt the new champion; Hirata quickly pinned the belt to win the Ironman Heavymetalweight Championship, although the Junior Heavyweight Championship and its belt remained in Takahashi's possession.

== Reigns ==
Current champion Yoh

As of November 21, 2026, there have been a total of 100 reigns shared among 44 different wrestlers with eight vacancies. Title changes happen mostly at NJPW-promoted events, as it has only changed hands at non-NJPW events twice. Reigns 36 and 37 occurred on World Championship Wrestling's Nitro television program, when Juventud Guerrera defeated Jushin Thunder Liger on November 29, 1999, and on December 6, 1999, when Liger retrieved the championship by defeating Guerrera's stand-in Psychosis. Shiro Koshinaka was the first champion in the title's history. Liger holds the record for most reigns with eleven, over which he has successfully defended the title 31 times, more than any champion. He also holds the record for the longest reign in the title's history at 628 days during his sixth reign. Guerrera's only reign of 7 days is the shortest in the title's history.

The current champion is Yoh, who is in his first reign. He won the title by defeating Douki at Dominion 6.14 in Osaka-jo Hall in Osaka, Japan, on June 14, 2026.

Key
No.	Overall reign number
Reign	Reign number for the specific champion
Days	Number of days held
Defenses	Number of successful defenses
+	Current reign is changing daily

No.	Champion	Championship change			Reign statistics			Notes	Ref.
No.	Champion	Date	Event	Location	Reign	Days	Defenses	Notes	Ref.
New Japan Pro Wrestling (NJPW)
1	Shiro Koshinaka	February 6, 1986	New Year Dash 1986	Tokyo, Japan	1	102	1	Defeated The Cobra in a tournament final to become the first champion.	
2	Nobuhiko Takada	May 19, 1986	IWGP Champion Series 1986	Tokyo, Japan	1	123	6		
3	Shiro Koshinaka	September 19, 1986	Challenge Spirit 1986	Fukuoka, Japan	2	317	2		
—	Vacated	August 2, 1987	—	—	—	—	—	Koshinaka vacated the championship due to injuring his right ankle.	
4	Kuniaki Kobayashi	August 20, 1987	Summer Night Fever In Kokugikan	Tokyo, Japan	1	129	1	Defeated Nobuhiko Takada to win the vacant championship.	
5	Hiroshi Hase	December 27, 1987	Year End in Kokugikan 1987	Tokyo, Japan	1	152	3		
6	Owen Hart	May 27, 1988	IWGP Champion Series 1988	Sendai, Japan	1	28	1		
7	Shiro Koshinaka	June 24, 1988	IWGP Champion Series 1988	Osaka, Japan	3	265	6		
8	Hiroshi Hase	March 16, 1989	Big Fight Series	Yokohama, Japan	2	70	0		
9	Jushin Liger	May 25, 1989	Battle Satellite 1989 In Osaka Dome	Osaka, Japan	1	77	2		
10	Naoki Sano	August 10, 1989	Fighting Satellite of 1989	Tokyo, Japan	1	174	2		
11	Jushin Thunder Liger	January 31, 1990	New Spring Gold Series 1990	Osaka, Japan	2	200	1	Previously known as Jushin Liger.	
12	Pegasus Kid	August 19, 1990	Summer Night Fever II	Tokyo, Japan	1	74	0		
13	Jushin Thunder Liger	November 1, 1990	Dream Tour 1990	Tokyo, Japan	3	165	2		
—	Vacated	April 15, 1991	—	—	—	—	—	Liger vacated the championship so a new champion could be decided in the Top of the Super Juniors tournament.	
14	Norio Honaga	April 30, 1991	Explosion Tour 1991	Tokyo, Japan	1	43	2	Defeated Jushin Thunder Liger in the finals of the Top of the Super Juniors tournament.	
15	Jushin Thunder Liger	June 12, 1991	Fighting Connection ~ Ultra-High And Mighty Declaration II ~	Tokyo, Japan	4	58	0		
16	Akira Nogami	August 9, 1991	Violent Storm in Kokugikan	Tokyo, Japan	1	88	1		
17	Norio Honaga	November 5, 1991	Tokyo 3 Days Battle	Tokyo, Japan	2	95	1		
18	Jushin Thunder Liger	February 8, 1992	NJPW Fighting Spirit 1992	Sapporo, Japan	5	139	3		
19	El Samurai	June 26, 1992	Masters Of Wrestling	Tokyo, Japan	1	149	3		
20	Último Dragón	November 22, 1992	Wrestling Scramble 1992	Tokyo, Japan	1	43	1		
21	Jushin Thunder Liger	January 4, 1993	Fantastic Story in Tokyo Dome	Tokyo, Japan	6	628	5		
—	Vacated	September 24, 1994	—	—	—	—	—	Liger vacated the championship due to fracturing his left ankle.	
22	Norio Honaga	September 27, 1994	G1 Climax Special 1994	Osaka, Japan	3	145	6	Defeated Wild Pegasus in a tournament final to win the vacant championship.	
23	Koji Kanemoto	February 19, 1995	Fighting Spirit 1995	Tokyo, Japan	1	73	2		
24	Sabu	May 3, 1995	Wrestling Dontaku 1995	Fukuoka, Japan	1	42	1		
25	Koji Kanemoto	June 14, 1995	Fighting Spirit Legend	Tokyo, Japan	2	204	2	This match was also for Kanemoto's UWA World Welterweight Championship.	
26	Jushin Thunder Liger	January 4, 1996	Wrestling World	Tokyo, Japan	7	116	2		
27	The Great Sasuke	April 29, 1996	Battle Formation	Tokyo, Japan	1	165	5	On August 5, 1996, Sasuke won an 8-man tournament to form the J-Crown, an octuple-belt championship that includes the IWGP Junior Heavyweight title; these titles were still considered separate, but were defended together.	
28	Último Dragón	October 11, 1996	Osaka Crush Night	Osaka, Japan	2	85	7		
29	Jushin Thunder Liger	January 4, 1997	Wrestling World 1997	Tokyo, Japan	8	183	4	Liger lost the WAR International Junior Heavyweight Championship from the J-Crown on June 6, 1997, but continued to defend the other 7 belts.	
30	El Samurai	July 6, 1997	Summer Struggle 1997	Sapporo, Japan	2	35	0		
31	Shinjiro Otani	August 10, 1997	The Four Heaven in Nagoya Dome	Nagoya, Japan	1	181	5	On November 5, 1997, Otani vacated all J-Crown belts but the IWGP Junior Heavyweight title after the WWF retook control of its Light Heavyweight title, effectively ending the J-Crown.	
32	Jushin Thunder Liger	February 7, 1998	Fighting Spirit 1998	Sapporo, Japan	9	403	8		
33	Koji Kanemoto	March 17, 1999	Hyper Battle 1999	Hiroshima, Japan	3	164	3		
34	Kendo Kashin	August 28, 1999	Jingu Climax	Tokyo, Japan	1	44	1		
35	Jushin Thunder Liger	October 11, 1999	Final Dome	Tokyo, Japan	10	49	1		
36	Juventud Guerrera	November 29, 1999	Nitro	Denver, Colorado, U.S.	1	7	0		
37	Jushin Thunder Liger	December 6, 1999	Nitro	Milwaukee, Wisconsin, U.S.	11	227	3	Psychosis replaced Guerrera in the match due to Guerrera suffering a fractured right arm.	
38	Tatsuhito Takaiwa	July 20, 2000	Summer Struggle 2000	Sapporo, Japan	1	101	2		
39	Minoru Tanaka	October 29, 2000	Get a Right!!	Kobe, Japan	1	264	2		
40	Masayuki Naruse	July 20, 2001	Dome Quake	Sapporo, Japan	1	80	1		
41	Tokimitsu Ishizawa/Kendo Kashin	October 8, 2001	Indicate of Next	Tokyo, Japan	2	116	2	Won the title under the name Tokimitsu Ishizawa, but defended it under the name Kendo Kashin.	
—	Vacated	February 1, 2002	—	—	—	—	—	Kashin left NJPW and returned the title to the IWGP Championship Committee.	
42	Minoru Tanaka	February 16, 2002	Fighting Spirit 2002	Tokyo, Japan	2	153	3	Defeated Masahito Kakihara to win the championship.	
43	Koji Kanemoto	July 19, 2002	Summer Fight Series 2002	Sapporo, Japan	4	278	6		
44	Tiger Mask (IV)	April 23, 2003	Strong Energy 2003	Hiroshima, Japan	1	153	4		
—	Vacated	September 23, 2003	—	—	—	—	—	The championship was vacated so it could be contested for in a battle royal.	
45	Jado	October 13, 2003	Ultimate Crush II	Tokyo, Japan	1	62	1	Defeated Dick Togo, El Samurai, Gedo, Heat, Jushin Thunder Liger, Katsushi Takemura, Koji Kanemoto, Masahito Kakihara, Masayuki Naruse and Tiger Mask (IV) in a battle royal to win the vacant championship.	
46	Heat	December 14, 2003	Battle Final 2003	Nagoya, Japan	3	387	11	Previously known as Minoru Tanaka.	
47	Tiger Mask (IV)	January 4, 2005	Toukon Festival: Wrestling World	Tokyo, Japan	2	277	3		
48	Black Tiger (IV)	October 8, 2005	Toukon Souzou New Chapter	Tokyo, Japan	1	134	1	This match was also for Black Tiger's NWA World Junior Heavyweight Championship.	
49	Tiger Mask (IV)	February 19, 2006	Acceleration	Tokyo, Japan	3	73	1	This match was also for Black Tiger's NWA World Junior Heavyweight Championship.	
50	Koji Kanemoto	May 3, 2006	New Japan Cup 2006 Special	Fukuoka, Japan	5	235	1		
51	Minoru	December 24, 2006	Battle Xmas! Catch the Victory	Tokyo, Japan	4	194	4	Previously known as Minoru Tanaka/Heat.	
52	Ryusuke Taguchi	July 6, 2007	New Japan Soul C.T.U Farewell Tour	Tokyo, Japan	1	155	4		
53	Wataru Inoue	December 8, 2007	New Japan Alive	Osaka, Japan	1	191	3		
—	Vacated	June 16, 2008	—	—	—	—	—	The championship was vacated when Inoue moved to the heavyweight division.	
54	Tiger Mask (IV)	July 8, 2008	New Japan Trill	Tokyo, Japan	4	75	0	Defeated Prince Devitt in a tournament final to win the vacant championship.	
55	Low Ki	September 21, 2008	New Japan Generation	Kobe, Japan	1	105	1		
56	Tiger Mask (IV)	January 4, 2009	Wrestle Kingdom III in Tokyo Dome	Tokyo, Japan	5	223	4		
57	Místico	August 15, 2009	G1 Climax 2009: New Lords, New Laws	Tokyo, Japan	1	85	2		
58	Tiger Mask (IV)	November 8, 2009	Destruction '09	Tokyo, Japan	6	57	0		
59	Naomichi Marufuji	January 4, 2010	Wrestle Kingdom IV in Tokyo Dome	Tokyo, Japan	1	166	5		
60	Prince Devitt	June 19, 2010	Dominion 6.19	Osaka, Japan	1	364	7		
61	Kota Ibushi	June 18, 2011	Dominion 6.18	Osaka, Japan	1	86	2		
—	Vacated	September 12, 2011	—	—	—	—	—	The championship was vacated after Ibushi was sidelined with a shoulder injury.	
62	Prince Devitt	September 19, 2011	Kantaro Hoshino Memorial Show	Kobe, Japan	2	227	4	Defeated Kushida to win the vacant championship.	
63	Low Ki	May 3, 2012	Wrestling Dontaku	Fukuoka, Japan	2	87	1		
64	Kota Ibushi	July 29, 2012	Last Rebellion	Tokyo, Japan	2	71	2		
65	Low Ki	October 8, 2012	King of Pro-Wrestling	Tokyo, Japan	3	34	0		
66	Prince Devitt	November 11, 2012	Power Struggle	Osaka, Japan	3	419	4		
67	Kota Ibushi	January 4, 2014	Wrestle Kingdom 8 in Tokyo Dome	Tokyo, Japan	3	181	4		
68	Kushida	July 4, 2014	Kizuna Road 2014	Tokyo, Japan	1	79	0		
69	Ryusuke Taguchi	September 21, 2014	Destruction in Kobe	Kobe, Japan	2	105	2		
70	Kenny Omega	January 4, 2015	Wrestle Kingdom 9 in Tokyo Dome	Tokyo, Japan	1	182	3		
71	Kushida	July 5, 2015	Dominion 7.5 in Osaka-jo Hall	Osaka, Japan	2	80	1		
72	Kenny Omega	September 23, 2015	Destruction in Okayama	Okayama, Japan	2	103	1		
73	Kushida	January 4, 2016	Wrestle Kingdom 10 in Tokyo Dome	Tokyo, Japan	3	257	5		
74	Bushi	September 17, 2016	Destruction in Tokyo	Tokyo, Japan	1	49	0		
75	Kushida	November 5, 2016	Power Struggle	Osaka, Japan	4	60	0		
76	Hiromu Takahashi	January 4, 2017	Wrestle Kingdom 11 in Tokyo Dome	Tokyo, Japan	1	158	4		
77	Kushida	June 11, 2017	Dominion 6.11 in Osaka-jo Hall	Osaka, Japan	5	120	2		
78	Will Ospreay	October 9, 2017	King of Pro-Wrestling	Tokyo, Japan	1	27	0		
79	Marty Scurll	November 5, 2017	Power Struggle	Osaka, Japan	1	60	0		
80	Will Ospreay	January 4, 2018	Wrestle Kingdom 12 in Tokyo Dome	Tokyo, Japan	2	156	3	This was a four-way match, also involving Hiromu Takahashi and Kushida.	
81	Hiromu Takahashi	June 9, 2018	Dominion 6.9 in Osaka-jo Hall	Osaka, Japan	2	72	2		
—	Vacated	August 20, 2018	—	—	—	—	—	The championship was vacated after Takahashi suffered a neck injury.	
82	Kushida	October 8, 2018	King of Pro-Wrestling	Tokyo, Japan	6	88	0	Defeated Marty Scurll to win the vacant championship.	
83	Taiji Ishimori	January 4, 2019	Wrestle Kingdom 13 in Tokyo Dome	Tokyo, Japan	1	92	2		
84	Dragon Lee	April 6, 2019	G1 Supercard	New York City, U.S.	1	64	1	This was a three-way match, also involving Bandido.	
85	Will Ospreay	June 9, 2019	Dominion 6.9 in Osaka-jo Hall	Osaka, Japan	3	209	3		
86	Hiromu Takahashi	January 4, 2020	Wrestle Kingdom 14 in Tokyo Dome	Tokyo, Japan	3	238	1		
87	Taiji Ishimori	August 29, 2020	Summer Struggle in Jingu	Tokyo, Japan	2	129	0		
88	Hiromu Takahashi	January 5, 2021	Wrestle Kingdom 15 in Tokyo Dome	Tokyo, Japan	4	51	1		
—	Vacated	February 25, 2021	—	—	—	—	—	The championship was vacated after Takahashi suffered a pectoral muscle injury.	
89	El Desperado	February 28, 2021	Castle Attack	Osaka, Japan	1	147	2	Defeated Bushi and El Phantasmo, in a three-way match, to win the vacant championship.	
90	Robbie Eagles	July 25, 2021	Wrestle Grand Slam in Tokyo Dome	Tokyo, Japan	1	104	1		
91	El Desperado	November 6, 2021	Power Struggle	Osaka, Japan	2	176	3		
92	Taiji Ishimori	May 1, 2022	Wrestling Dontaku	Fukuoka, Japan	3	248	1		
93	Hiromu Takahashi	January 4, 2023	Wrestle Kingdom 17	Tokyo, Japan	5	365	7	This was a four-way match, also involving El Desperado and Master Wato.	
94	El Desperado	January 4, 2024	Wrestle Kingdom 18	Tokyo, Japan	3	50	1		
95	Sho	February 23, 2024	The New Beginning in Sapporo	Sapporo, Japan	1	114	2	This title change was via countout	
96	El Desperado	June 16, 2024	New Japan Soul; Night 1	Sapporo, Japan	4	19	0	This was a steel cage match.	
97	Douki	July 5, 2024	New Japan Soul; Night 7	Tokyo, Japan	1	183	4		
98	El Desperado	January 4, 2025	Wrestle Kingdom 19	Tokyo, Japan	5	275	8		
99	Douki	October 6, 2025	Road to King of Pro Wrestling: Night 2	Tokyo, Japan	2	251	4		
100	Yoh	June 14, 2026	Dominion 6.14 in Osaka-jo Hall	Osaka, Japan	1	160+	4		

== Combined reigns ==
As of November 21, 2026.

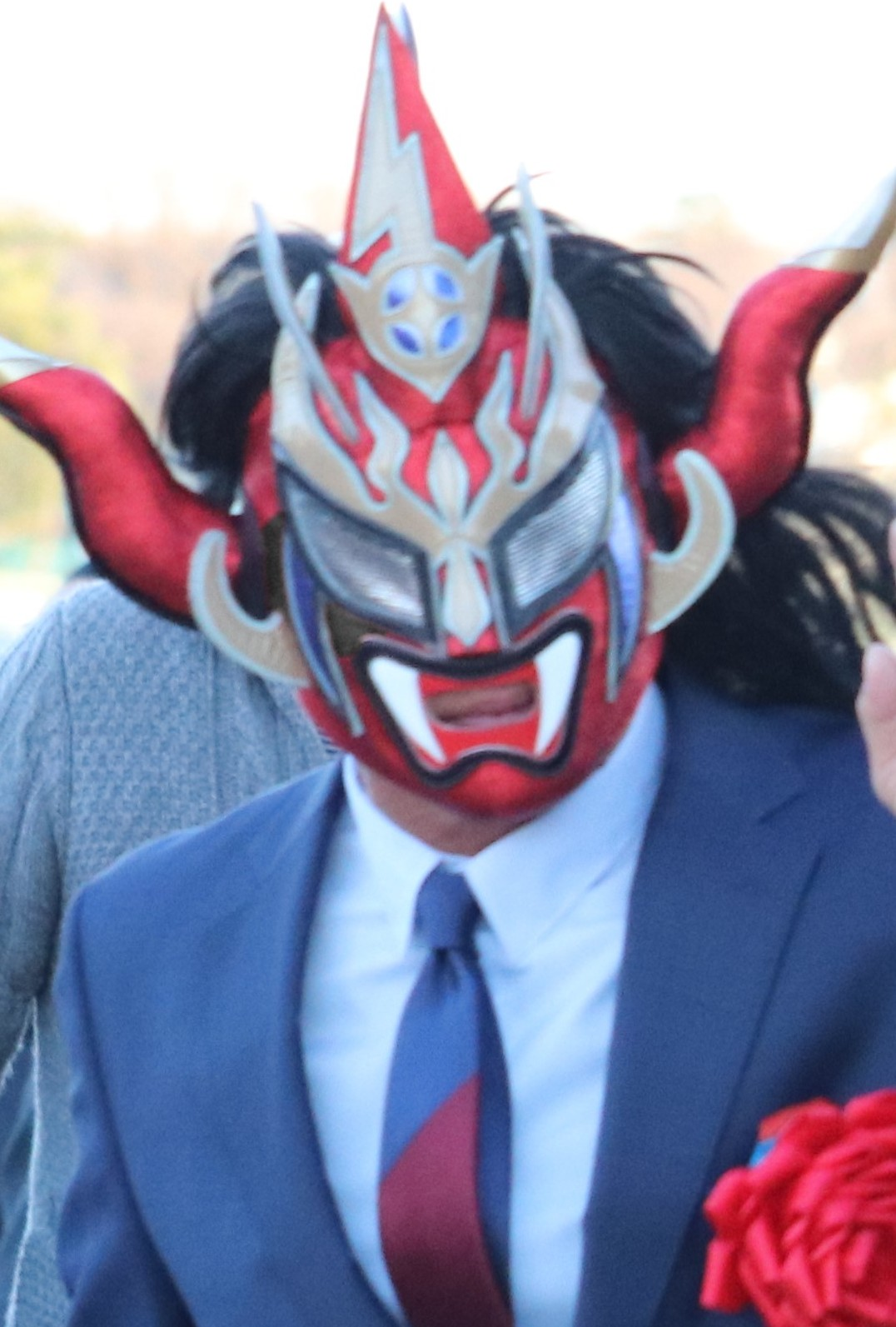
Record eleven-time champion Jushin Thunder Liger also holds the records for longest reign at 628 days, longest combined reign at 2,245 days, and most combined defenses at 31.

†	Indicates the current champion

Rank^{[A]}	Wrestler	No. of reigns	Combined defenses	Combined days
1	Jushin Liger/Jushin Thunder Liger	11	31	2,245
2	Prince Devitt	3	15	1,010
3	Heat/Minoru/Minoru Tanaka	4	20	998
4	Koji Kanemoto	5	14	954
5	Hiromu Takahashi	5	15	884
6	Tiger Mask (IV)	6	12	858
7	Shiro Koshinaka	3	9	702
8	Kushida	6	8	684
9	El Desperado	5	14	667
10	Taiji Ishimori	3	3	469
11	Douki	2	8	434
12	Will Ospreay	3	6	392
13	Kota Ibushi	3	8	338
14	Kenny Omega	2	4	285
15	Norio Honaga	3	9	283
16	Ryusuke Taguchi	2	6	260
17	Low Ki	3	2	226
18	Hiroshi Hase	2	3	222
19	Wataru Inoue	1	3	191
20	El Samurai	2	3	184
21	Shinjiro Otani	1	5	181
22	Naoki Sano	1	2	174
23	Naomichi Marufuji	1	5	166
24	The Great Sasuke	1	5	165
25	Yoh †	1	4	160+
26	Tokimitsu Ishizawa/Kendo Kashin	2	3	160
27	Black Tiger (IV)	1	1	134
28	Kuniaki Kobayashi	1	1	129
29	Último Dragón	2	8	128
29	Nobuhiko Takada	1	6	123
31	Sho	1	2	114
32	Robbie Eagles	1	1	104
33	Tatsuhito Takaiwa	1	2	101
34	Akira Nogami	1	1	88
35	Místico	1	2	85
36	Masayuki Naruse	1	1	80
37	Pegasus Kid	1	0	74
38	Dragon Lee	1	1	64
39	Jado	1	1	62
40	Marty Scurll	1	0	60
41	Bushi	1	0	49
42	Sabu	1	1	42
43	Owen Hart	1	1	28
44	Juventud Guerrera	1	0	7
