= Wrestle Kingdom 15 =

2021 professional wrestling event

- Promotional poster featuring various NJPW wrestlers
- Promotion: New Japan Pro-Wrestling
- Date: January 4–5, 2021
- City: Tokyo, Japan
- Venue: Tokyo Dome
- Attendance: Night 1: 12,689; Night 2: 7,801; Combined: 20,490
- Tagline: Go To New Japan!

Event chronology
← Previous; Power Struggle; Road to Tokyo Dome	Next → New Year Dash!!

Wrestle Kingdom chronology
← Previous; 14	Next → 16

Wrestle Kingdom 15 in Tokyo Dome was a professional wrestling pay-per-view (PPV) event produced by New Japan Pro-Wrestling (NJPW). The event took place over two nights, on January 4 and 5, 2021 at the Tokyo Dome in Tokyo, Japan. It was the 30th January 4 Tokyo Dome Show and the 15th promoted under the Wrestle Kingdom name.

== Production ==
Other on-screen personnel
Role:	Name:
English Commentators	Kevin Kelly
English Commentators	Chris Charlton
English Commentators	Rocky Romero
Japanese Commentators	Shinpei Nogami
Japanese Commentators	Milano Collection A.T.
Japanese Commentators	Katsuhiko Kanazawa
Japanese Commentators	Kazuyoshi Sakai
Japanese Commentators	Togi Makabe
Japanese Commentators	Miki Motoi
Japanese Commentators	Jushin Thunder Liger
Japanese Commentators	Masahiro Chono
Ring announcers	Makoto Abe
Ring announcers	Kimihiko Ozaki
Referees	Kenta Sato
Referees	Marty Asami
Referees	Red Shoes Unno

=== Background ===
The January 4 Tokyo Dome Show is NJPW's biggest annual event and has been called "the largest professional wrestling show in the world outside of the United States" and the "Japanese equivalent to the Super Bowl". The show has been promoted under the Wrestle Kingdom name since 2007.

NJPW announced Wrestle Kingdom 15 for January 4 and 5, 2021 on October 18, 2020, during the G1 Climax 30 finals. This marked the second time that Wrestle Kingdom took place over two nights.

Due to the COVID-19 pandemic, Wrestle Kingdom 15 originally had a limited attendance capacity of 20,000 for both nights. On December 29, NJPW stopped ticket sales due to tighter restrictions on large-scale events in Tokyo.

On December 20, NJPW's sister promotion World Wonder Ring Stardom announced that they would host a match on the January 5 event.

=== Storylines ===
On October 18, 2020, Kota Ibushi won the G1 Climax 30 by defeating Sanada in the finals, entitling him to a match for both the IWGP Heavyweight Championship and IWGP Intercontinental Championship at Wrestle Kingdom 15. Ibushi unsuccessfully defended his Right to Challenge contract at Power Struggle on November 7, losing the contract to Jay White. On November 8, Naito announced that he would defend the titles against both Ibushi and White on the two nights, Ibushi on night 1 and White on night 2.

On October 16, 2020, Will Ospreay defeated Kazuchika Okada in their A Block G1 Climax match, after interference from Bea Priestley and the returning young lion Tomoyuki Oka who was on an excursion at Revolution Pro Wrestling, performing under the ring name Great-O-Khan. After the match Ospreay turned heel when he attacked Okada; in the post-match interview Ospreay announced he left Chaos and formed a new stable, later called The Empire. At Power Struggle, Okada defeated Great-O-Khan; after the match, Ospreay challenged Okada to a match at Wrestle Kingdom 15 which Okada accepted.

On December 11, Hiromu Takahashi defeated El Desperado to win the Best of the Super Juniors tournament; after the match, Takahashi said he wanted to face the Super J-Cup winner before facing the IWGP Junior Heavyweight Champion. On December 12, El Phantasmo won the Super J-Cup by defeating A. C. H. and accepted Takahashi's challenge. NJPW announced that Takahashi and El Phantasmo would face each other on night 1 at Wrestle Kingdom 15 with the winner facing Taiji Ishimori on night 2 for the IWGP Junior Heavyweight Championship.

On August 21, 2020, Kenta defeated David Finlay to win the New Japan Cup USA tournament, which entitled him to a match for the IWGP United States Championship. During Road to Tokyo Dome on December 22, Juice Robinson challenged Kenta to a match for Kenta's Right to Challenge contract at Wrestle Kingdom. However, Robinson would suffer an injury to his orbital bone, and NJPW subsequently named Satoshi Kojima as Robinson's replacement.

== Results ==
Night 1
No.	Results	Stipulations	Times
1^{P}	Chase Owens, Bad Luck Fale, Bushi, and Toru Yano won (Note: Other competitors by order of elimination: Minoru Suzuki, Yuji Nagata, Toa Henare, Hirooki Goto, Yoshi-Hashi, Togi Makabe, Douki, Yujiro Takahashi, Tomohiro Ishii, Tomoaki Honma, Hiroyoshi Tenzan, Rocky Romero, Sho, Tiger Mask, Gabriel Kidd, Yota Tsuji, and Yuya Uemura)	21-man New Japan Rambo to determine who will challenge for the Provisional KOPW 2021 Trophy on night 2	34:40
2	Hiromu Takahashi (Best of the Super Juniors winner) defeated El Phantasmo (Super J-Cup winner)	Singles match to determine who will challenge for the IWGP Junior Heavyweight Championship on night 2	17:46
3	Guerrillas of Destiny (Tama Tonga and Tanga Loa) (with Jado) defeated Dangerous Tekkers (Taichi and Zack Sabre Jr.) (c) (with Douki)	Tag team match for the IWGP Tag Team Championship	19:18
4	Kenta (c) defeated Satoshi Kojima (with Hiroyoshi Tenzan)	Singles match for the IWGP United States Championship challenge rights certificate	14:12
5	Hiroshi Tanahashi defeated Great-O-Khan	Singles match	17:13
6	Kazuchika Okada defeated Will Ospreay (with Bea Priestley)	Singles match	35:41
7	Kota Ibushi defeated Tetsuya Naito (c)	Singles match for the IWGP Heavyweight Championship and IWGP Intercontinental Championship	31:18
(c) / – the champion(s) heading into the match; P / – the match was broadcast on the pre-show

Night 2
No.	Results	Stipulations	Times
1^{D}	Queen's Quest (AZM, Saya Kamitani, and Utami Hayashishita) defeated MaiHimePoi (Himeka, Maika and Natsupoi)	Six-woman tag team match This was a Stardom exhibition match.	9:48
2^{D}	Donna Del Mondo (Syuri and Giulia) defeated Mayu Iwatani and Tam Nakano	Tag team match This was a Stardom exhibition match.	12:49
3	Toru Yano defeated Chase Owens, Bad Luck Fale, and Bushi	Four way match for the Provisional KOPW 2021 Trophy	7:34
4	Suzuki-gun (El Desperado and Yoshinobu Kanemaru) (c) defeated One or Eight (Ryusuke Taguchi and Master Wato) (with Hiroyoshi Tenzan)	Tag team match for the IWGP Junior Heavyweight Tag Team Championship	13:20
5	Shingo Takagi (c) defeated Jeff Cobb	Singles match for the NEVER Openweight Championship	21:11
6	Sanada defeated Evil (with Dick Togo)	Singles match	23:40
7	Hiromu Takahashi defeated Taiji Ishimori (c)	Singles match for the IWGP Junior Heavyweight Championship	25:31
8	Kota Ibushi (c) defeated Jay White (with Gedo)	Singles match for the IWGP Heavyweight Championship and IWGP Intercontinental Championship	48:05
(c) / – the champion(s) heading into the match; D / – this was a dark match

== See also ==
- 2022 in professional wrestling
- Professional wrestling at the Tokyo Dome
- List of NJPW pay-per-view events
