= Hiroyoshi Tenzan =

Japanese professional wrestler (born 1971)

- Tenzan in August 2026

Personal information
- Born: Hiroyoshi Yamamoto; March 23, 1971 (age 55) Kyoto, Kyoto, Japan

Professional wrestling career
- Ring name(s): Hiroyoshi Tenzan; Hiroyoshi Yamamoto; Super Strong Machine Buffalo; Tenzan
- Billed height: 1.83 m (6 ft 0 in)
- Billed weight: 115 kg (254 lb)
- Trained by: Tokyo Joe; Kotetsu Yamamoto; Hiroshi Hase; Kensuke Sasaki
- Debut: January 11, 1991
- Retired: August 15, 2026

Hiroyoshi Yamamoto (山本 広吉, Yamamoto Hiroyoshi; born March 23, 1971), better known by his ring name Hiroyoshi Tenzan (天山 広吉, Tenzan Hiroyoshi), is a retired Japanese professional wrestler. He is signed to New Japan Pro-Wrestling (NJPW). With Satoshi Kojima, in 2008, they won the World's Strongest Tag Determination League in All Japan Pro Wrestling and the G1 Tag League in NJPW, becoming the only tag team which has done both. He is a four-time IWGP Heavyweight Champion and a record twelve-time IWGP Tag Team Champion.

== Professional wrestling career ==
=== New-Japan Pro Wrestling (1991–1993) ===
Hiroyoshi Yamamoto first worked for New Japan Pro-Wrestling. He debuted in January 1991, wrestling Osamu Matsuda.

=== Catch Wrestling Association (1993–1995) ===
In 1993, after winning the Young Lions Cup, NJPW sent Yamamoto on a European excursion; one of his stops was in the Catch Wrestling Association in Germany, where in July 1993, he defeated Lance Storm to become the promotion's first World Junior Heavyweight Champion. A few weeks later, he lost the title to Storm. Three months later, he would regain and lose the title back to Storm.

=== Return to NJPW (1995–2026) ===
After spending nearly two years in Europe, Yamamoto would finally make his return to NJPW on January 4, 1995, at the Tokyo Dome, this time under a new name, Hiroyoshi Tenzan (天山 広吉, Tenzan Hiroyoshi). The name was given to him by Tokyo Joe, who derived the name from the Tien Shan mountains. A month later, he received his very first shot at the IWGP Heavyweight Championship in a losing effort against Shinya Hashimoto. Tenzan then began teaming with Masahiro Chono as Team Wolf. In June 1995, Tenzan and Chono won the IWGP Tag Team Championship in a tournament, which they held for a month until the title was vacated due to Chono missing a match when his father died.

In July 1996, Tenzan and Chono won the IWGP Tag Team Title again, this time beating Kazuo Yamazaki and Takashi Iizuka. They held the titles for over 5 months before losing to Tatsumi Fujinami and Kengo Kimura in January 1997. A few weeks later, Tenzan became a founding member of NWO Japan, as Chono joined the nWo in December 1996. For the rest of 1997, Tenzan and the rest of nWo Japan continued the nWo tradition of attacking their various enemies.

Tenzan got his third chance for the IWGP Tag Team Titles in July 1998, after Chono's former tag-team partner Keiji Mutoh was injured. Tenzan and Chono went on to win the tournament and the belts. A month later, they were defeated by Genichiro Tenryu and Shiro Koshinaka. Tenzan continued to feud with Tenryu and Koshinaka, eventually getting a new partner in Satoshi Kojima, thanks to Mutoh's leadership in nWo Japan. The two teams fought at the Tokyo Dome in January 1999, with Tenzan and Kojima coming through, defeating Koshinaka and Tenryu to get the IWGP Tag-Team belts. A few months later, Koshinaka retook the titles from Tenzan and Kojima, with his partner Kensuke Sasaki. For the next year, Tenzan continued to wrestle in NJPW, feuding with Koshinaka, Masahiro Chono, Manabu Nakanishi, and others. He defeated Wild Pegasus at the Tokyo Dome in January 2000.

In July 2000, Tenzan, still teamed with Kojima, got the IWGP Tag Team Titles for the 5th time, winning over Manabu Nakanishi and Yuji Nagata. Tenzan and Kojima feuded with Nakanishi and Nagata for the next few months, with Tenzan and Kojima coming out on top.

On February 24, 2002, Tenzan made a brief appearance at WWA The Revolution pay-per-view from Las Vegas, Nevada, where he choked Disco Inferno. Scott Steiner then attacked Disco in the ring. Tenzan could be seen sitting right behind the announcer's table when Disco joined commentary. He can be seen leaving the arena following Steiner's attack on Disco.

Tenzan also won the IWGP Tag Team Titles in March 2002 with Masahiro Chono (their title reign lasting over one year; it also tied the team record for most championships won with Fujinami & Kimura), and again in December 2003 with Osamu Nishimura.

After he and Chono lost the IWGP Tag Team titles to Hiroshi Tanahashi and Yutaka Yoshie, Tenzan went on a brief excursion to Canada in the summer of 2003, training with Tokyo Joe Daigo. When he returned for the G1 Climax, he transformed his wrestling style from a buffalo to an anaconda. The excursion worked, as he won his first G1 Climax, defeating NOAH's Jun Akiyama in the finals.

In November 2003, Tenzan finally won the IWGP Heavyweight Championship from Yoshihiro Takayama. He would go on to drop the title less than a month later to unlikely victor Shinsuke Nakamura, who, at the young age of 23, became the youngest world champion in company history. Tenzan proceeded to win it three other times (in February 2004 from Genichiro Tenryu, December 2004 from Kensuke Sasaki and May 2005 from Satoshi Kojima).

He lost the championship to AJPW Triple Crown Heavyweight Champion Kojima in a cross-promotional champion vs. champion match. The match had a unique finish designed to fool fans in attendance. The idea was to make it look like the match was going to end in a 60-minute time limit draw. However, with just seconds before the match would be declared a time limit draw, Tenzan, who was known to have a legitimate back injury, could not continue, resulting in Kojima being declared the winner and becoming the new IWGP Heavyweight Champion. NJPW officials had come up with the finish, which was designed to look like a "mistake", having agreed with AJPW that it would be better if Kojima won the match, but not wanting the match to end in a standard pinfall or submission. Tenzan defeated Kojima in a rematch three months later, bringing the championship back to NJPW. He lost the championship to Kazuyuki Fujita on July 18, 2005.

Tenzan competed in the 2005 G1 Tournament, and almost made it to the semi-finals. In October 2005, Tenzan and Chono reunited to win the IWGP Tag Team Title for a fifth time from Hiroshi Tanahashi and Shinsuke Nakamura.

On August 13, 2006, Tenzan defeated longtime rival Satoshi Kojima in the final of the 2006 G1 Climax, becoming only the second wrestler to go undefeated in a round robin style G-1. This would be his third G1 title.

After severing ties with his old mentor Masahiro Chono, Tenzan founded the heel unit GBH ("Great Bash Heel", affectionately referred to by fans as "Great Big Head"); it was composed of Tenzan, Togi Makabe, Shiro Koshinaka, Toru Yano, Tomohiro Ishii and Tomoaki Honma. In February 2008, GBH turned on Tenzan with Makabe taking over the leadership of the group. Tenzan feuded with his former stablemates until the following October.

Since returning to New Japan in May 2009, he has split his time between reforming Tencozy and teaming with old GBH teammates Makabe and Honma against CHAOS. In August 2009 Tenzan was sidelined with an injury.

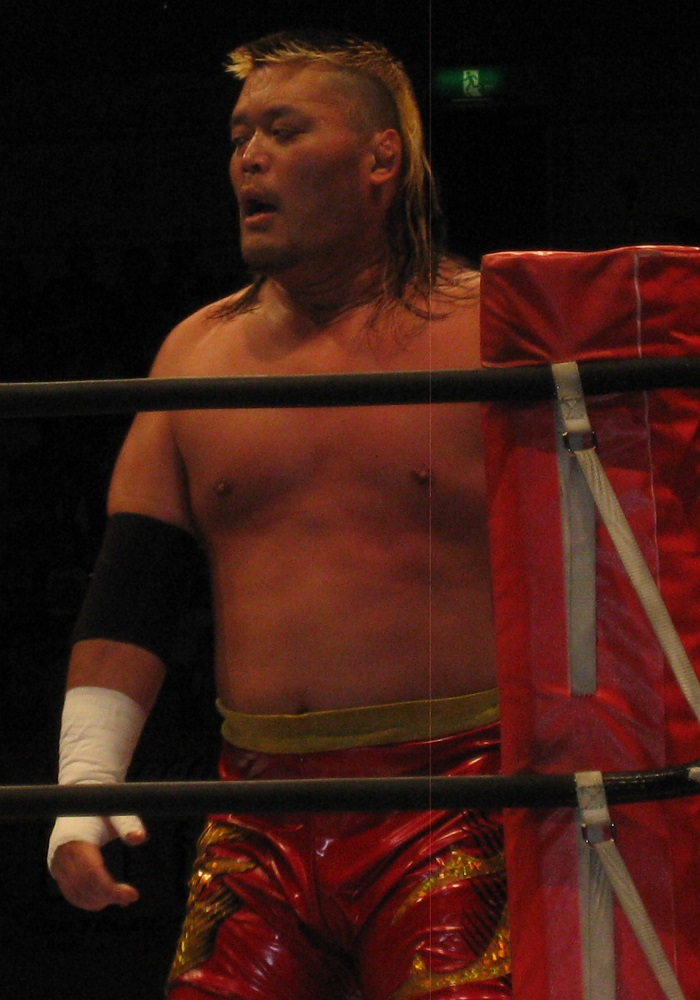
Tenzan in June 2014.

Fifteen months later on November 18, 2010, Tenzan returned to the ring, defeating Antonio Honda at New Japan's NEVER.4 event. On December 11 Tenzan wrestled his first main show for New Japan since his return, defeating Gedo in Osaka. After the match Tenzan was attacked by Takashi Iizuka, restarting the feud between the two. On January 4, 2011, at Wrestle Kingdom V in Tokyo Dome, Tenzan defeated Iizuka in a Deep Sleep to Lose match, a match that could only be won by choking the opponent unconscious. In August, Tenzan took part in the 2011 G1 Climax, where he managed to win four out of his nine matches, finishing in the middle of his block. Later in the year, Tenzan and Kojima reformed their Tencozy tag team, defeating CHAOS members Hideo Saito and Takashi Iizuka in their return match on December 4. On January 4, 2012, at Wrestle Kingdom VI in Tokyo Dome, Tenzan and Kojima defeated Bad Intentions (Giant Bernard and Karl Anderson) to win the IWGP Tag Team Championship for the third time together, Tenzan's ninth time individually. On May 3 at Wrestling Dontaku 2012, Tenzan and Kojima lost the title to Takashi Iizuka and Toru Yano in their third defense. On July 22, Tenzan and Kojima defeated Iizuka and Yano in a decision match to regain the newly vacated title. On October 8 at King of Pro-Wrestling, Tenzan and Kojima lost the title to K.E.S. (Davey Boy Smith, Jr. and Lance Archer). From November 20 to December 1, Tencozy took part in the round-robin portion of the 2012 World Tag League. The team finished with a record of four wins and two losses, winning their block and advancing to the semifinals of the tournament. On December 2, Tencozy was eliminated from the tournament in their semifinal match by Sword & Guns (Hirooki Goto and Karl Anderson). On May 3, 2013, Tencozy regained the IWGP Tag Team Championship from K.E.S. in a four-way match, which also included Takashi Iizuka and Toru Yano, and Manabu Nakanishi and Strong Man, starting Tenzan's eleventh reign as champion.

During early August, Tenzan competed in the G1 Climax, but midway through the tournament it was announced that, due to a fractured rib, he was pulled from the competition. Tenzan returned to the ring on October 14 at King of Pro-Wrestling, ironically just as Kojima was sidelined with an injury of his own, teaming with Takaaki Watanabe in a tag team match, where they were defeated by K.E.S. Kojima returned to the ring on November 9 at Power Struggle, where he and Tenzan lost the IWGP Tag Team Championship back to K.E.S. in a three-way match, which also included The IronGodz (Jax Dane and Rob Conway). In December, Tencozy made it to the finals of the 2013 World Tag League, defeating K.E.S. in the semifinals, before losing to Doc Gallows and Karl Anderson. On April 6, 2014, at Invasion Attack 2014, Tencozy defeated The IronGodz to win the NWA World Tag Team Championship. After four successful title defenses, they lost the title to K.E.S. on October 13 at King of Pro-Wrestling. The following month, Tencozy took part in the 2014 World Tag League, where they finished with a record of four wins and three losses, failing to advance to the finals.

On February 14, 2015, at The New Beginning in Sendai, Tenzan defeated Rob Conway to win the NWA World Heavyweight Championship. He made successful title defenses against Kojima on March 21 and Big Daddy Yum-Yum on April 29. In the 2015 G1 Climax, Tenzan finished second to last in his block with a record of three wins and six losses. On August 29, Tenzan lost the NWA World Heavyweight Championship to Jax Dane in San Antonio, Texas. On April 10, 2016, at Invasion Attack 2016, Tenzan unsuccessfully challenged Katsuyori Shibata for the NEVER Openweight Championship. When the participants for the 2016 G1 Climax were revealed, Tenzan was surprisingly left out of the tournament. Tenzan was a former three-time G1 Climax winner and the holder of the record for most wins in G1 Climax matches, who had participated in every tournament since 1995 with the exception of the 2010 tournament, which he missed due to an injury. Afterwards, Tenzan repeatedly expressed his anger at being left out of possibly his last G1 Climax. However, on July 3, Satoshi Kojima bowed out of the tournament and agreed to give his spot to Tenzan under the condition that he goes on to win the tournament. Tenzan later confirmed that the 2016 G1 Climax would be his last. After kicking off his tournament with two wins, Tenzan lost all seven of his following matches, finishing last in his block.

On March 6, 2017, Tencozy defeated Tomohiro Ishii and Toru Yano to win the IWGP Tag Team Championship for the sixth time. They lost the title to War Machine (Hanson and Raymond Rowe) on April 9 at Sakura Genesis 2017. Tencozy would participate in every World Tag League from 2015 onward, failing to advance to any finals.

Tenzan main evented the retirement show for Takashi Iizuka who had betrayed him in 2008. Tenzan had been trying to convince Iizuka to team with him once more before his retirement, and after match (which Tenzan had won, pinning Iizuka) the two embraced before Iizuka attacked and retired as a villain.

Tenzan competed in the newly expanded New Japan Cup in 2019, where he would lose in the Round of 32 to Ryusuke Taguchi , who was filling in for injured David Finlay. He would also compete in next year's tournament, losing in the same round to Yoshi-Hashi.

After 35 years, on May 5, 2026, Tenzan announced that he was retiring from the ring, which was confirmed in a press conference on May 11, 2026. His final match took place on August 15, exactly 13,000 days after his debut in 1991. He was retired by Satoshi Kojima at that year’s G1 Climax 36 show.

=== World Championship Wrestling (1995, 1998) ===
Tenzan had a brief tenure in World Championship Wrestling, most notably being defeated by "Macho Man" Randy Savage at Starrcade '95: World Cup of Wrestling; Tenzan would get a rematch with Savage at NJPW's Battle Formation show on April 29, 1996, and again he lost.

In 1998 he returned to WCW as a member of NWO Japan, where he mainly teamed with Masahiro Chono.

== Other media ==
Tenzan appeared in the video for "Yonaoshi Good Vibration" by Japanese metal band Sex Machineguns.

Tenzan also appeared as a cooking chief alongside Masahiro Chono on a movie called Kantoku Banzai! directed by Takeshi Kitano. He appears alongside Chono beating a few misconducted customers (played by Togi Makabe, Toru Yano, Jado, Gedo and a CTU Themed wrestler).

He has appeared on the Japanese television show Sasuke.

Tenzan, along with fellow NJPW wrestlers Hiroshi Tanahashi, Kazuchika Okada, Satoshi Kojima, Tetsuya Naito and Toru Yano, appears as a member of the gang Justis in the 2016 video game Yakuza 6: The Song of Life.

== Championships and accomplishments ==
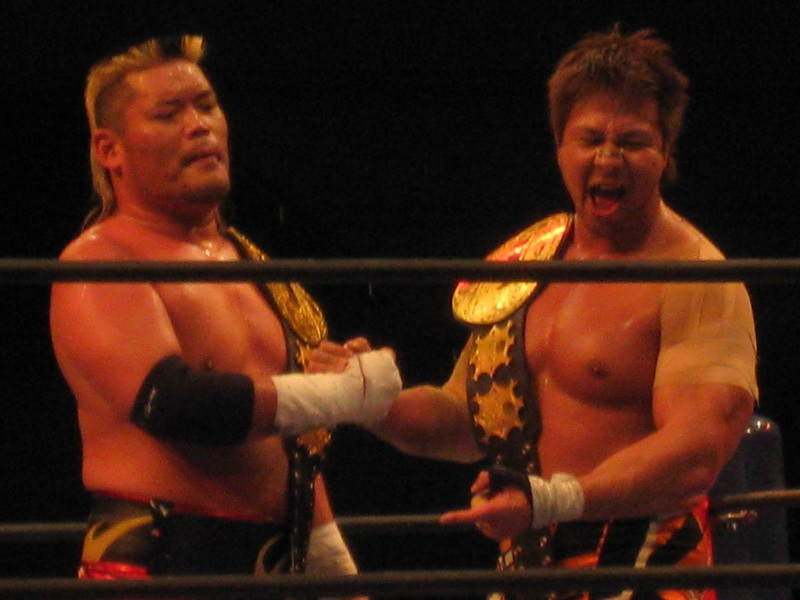
Tenzan (left) and Satoshi Kojima as the IWGP Tag Team Champions in February 2012.

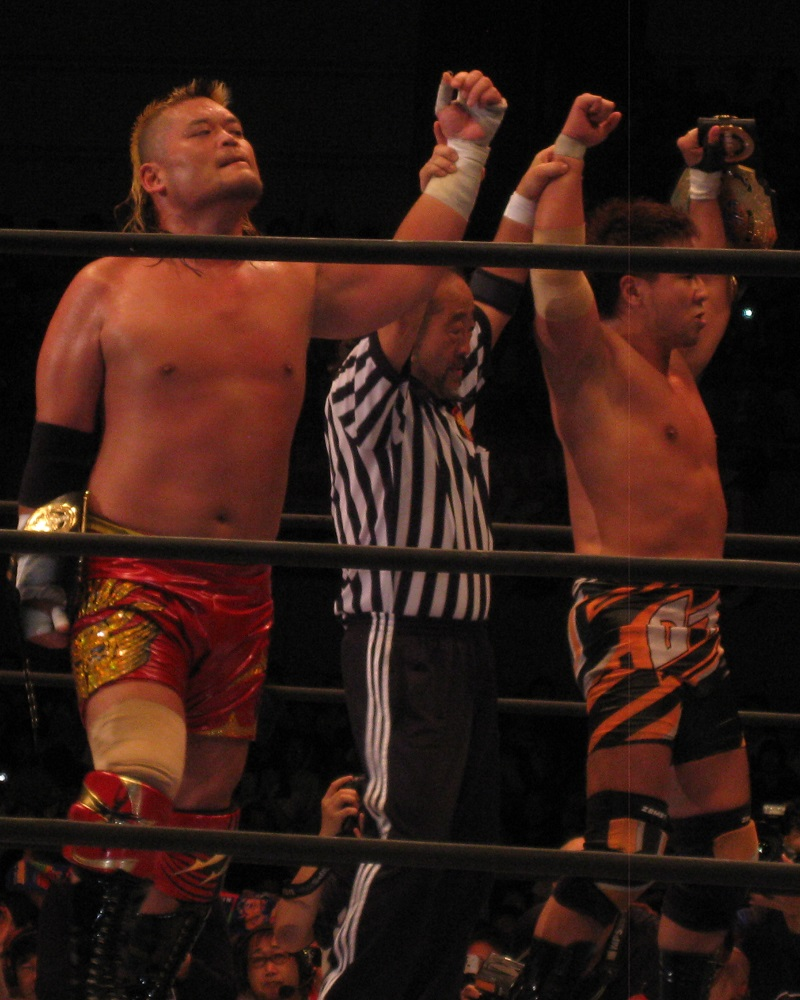
Tenzan (left) and Satoshi Kojima as the NWA World Tag Team Champions in June 2014.

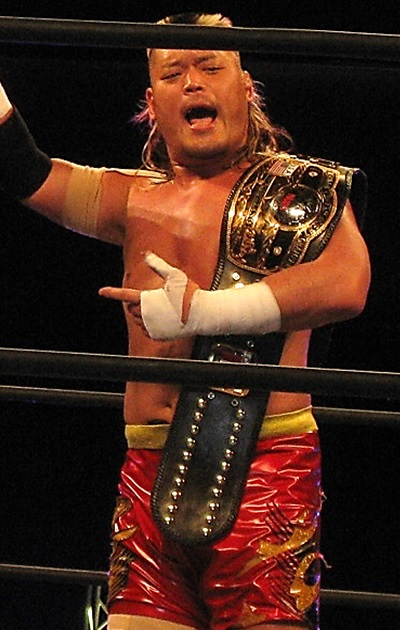
Tenzan as the NWA World Champion in March 2015.

- All Japan Pro Wrestling
  - World's Strongest Tag Determination League (2006, 2008) – with Satoshi Kojima
- Catch Wrestling Association
  - CWA World Junior Heavyweight Championship (1 times)
- National Wrestling Alliance
  - NWA World Heavyweight Championship (1 time)
  - NWA World Tag Team Championship (1 time) – with Satoshi Kojima
- New Japan Pro-Wrestling
  - IWGP Heavyweight Championship (4 times)
  - IWGP Tag Team Championship (12 times) – with Masahiro Chono (5), Satoshi Kojima (6), and Osamu Nishimura (1)
  - G1 Climax (2003, 2004, 2006)
  - G1 Tag League (2001, 2008) – with Satoshi Kojima
  - G1 Tag League (2003) – with Osamu Nishimura
  - Super Grade Tag League (1995) – with Masahiro Chono
  - Young Lion Cup (1993)
  - Yuke's Cup Tag Tournament (2008) – with Shinjiro Otani
  - 10,000,000 Yen Tag Tournament (2004) – with Shinsuke Nakamura
  - MVP Award (2003, 2004)
  - Singles Best Bout (2003) vs. Jun Akiyama on August 17
  - Singles Best Bout (2004) vs. Hiroshi Tanahashi on August 15
  - Tag Team Best Bout (2000) with Satoshi Kojima vs. Manabu Nakanishi and Yuji Nagata on October 9
  - Tag Team Best Bout (2002) with Masahiro Chono vs. Manabu Nakanishi and Osamu Nishimura on June 5
  - Tag Team Best Bout (2004) with Shinsuke Nakamura vs. Katsuyori Shibata and Masahiro Chono on October 24
- Nikkan Sports
  - Best Tag Team Award (2008) with Satoshi Kojima
- Pro Wrestling Illustrated
  - Ranked No. 10 of the 500 best singles wrestlers in the "PWI 500" in 2005
  - Ranked No. 223 of the top 500 singles wrestlers of the "PWI Years" in 2003
- Tokyo Sports
  - Fighting Spirit Award (2004)
  - Tag Team of the Year (1995)
  - Tag Team of the Year (1996) with Masahiro Chono and Hiro Saito
  - Tag Team of the Year (2000)
- Wrestling Observer Newsletter awards
  - Tag Team of the Year (2001) with Satoshi Kojima
  - Best Gimmick (1996) – nWo
  - Feud of the Year (1996) New World Order vs. World Championship Wrestling
