= Battle Formation (1996) =

Japanese wrestling event

- Promotion: New Japan Pro-Wrestling
- Date: April 29, 1996
- City: Tokyo, Japan
- Venue: Tokyo Dome
- Attendance: 55,000–65,000

Battle Formation chronology
← Previous; First	Next → 1997

New Japan Pro-Wrestling events chronology
← Previous; Wrestling World 1996	Next → Wrestling World 1997

The 1996 Battle Formation was the first Battle Formation event produced by New Japan Pro-Wrestling. The event was held on April 29, 1996 at the Tokyo Dome in Tokyo, Japan. It was a major success with a crowd of estimated 60,000 people and an approximate revenue of $5,700,000 from ticket sales. The event featured competitors from various promotions including Michinoku Pro Wrestling, New Japan Pro-Wrestling, Union of Wrestling Forces International, World Championship Wrestling and Wrestle Association R.

Nine professional wrestling matches were contested at the event. The main event saw the culmination of the lengthy invasion angle between NJPW and UWFi as UWFi's Nobuhiko Takada lost the IWGP Heavyweight Championship to NJPW's Shinya Hashimoto.

Another title change occurred at the event when The Great Sasuke defeated Jushin Liger to win the IWGP Junior Heavyweight Championship. The event featured many other major matches including an eight-man tag team match, in which NJPW representatives Osamu Nishimura, Riki Choshu, Satoshi Kojima and Takashi Iizuka defeated Heisei Ishingun (Akira Nogami, Akitoshi Saito, Michiyoshi Ohara and Shiro Koshinaka), a series of interpromotional matches between WCW wrestlers and NJPW faction Ookami Gundan members, and main event calibre matches pitting Tatsumi Fujinami against Genichiro Tenryu from WAR and The Great Muta against Jinsei Shinzaki from Michinoku Pro.

== Background ==
An invasion angle occurred in late 1995, when Union of Wrestling Forces International (UWFi) proposed a co-promotional angle with New Japan Pro-Wrestling due to UWFi suffering financial losses at the time. A co-promotional event between the two promotions took place on October 9, where a series of matches took place between NJPW and UWFi. The event was headlined by an IWGP Heavyweight Championship match between IWGP's Keiji Muto and UWFi's Nobuhiko Takada. Muto retained the title via submission. A title rematch took place at Wrestling World, where Takada defeated Muto to win the title. At the same event, Shinya Hashimoto defeated Kazuo Yamazaki and then confronted Takada in the ring following his title win, setting up a match between Takada and Hashimoto for the title at Battle Formation.

The event also marked a boiling point on the relationship between The Road Warriors and World Championship Wrestling. WCW management was irate that NJPW officials considered the Road Warriors a separate entity and not part of WCW stars that took part of the show. The situation soured ongoing contract negotiations between the Road Warriors and WCW, to the point that Eric Bischoff supposedly stalled on the deal, forcing Hawk and Animal to quit WCW after Slamboree on May 19. The Road Warriors would continue touring with NJPW until the end of 1996, before returning to the World Wrestling Federation in February 1997.

== Event ==
=== Preliminary matches ===
The event kicked off with a tag team match pitting Koji Kanemoto and Shinjiro Otani against Tokimitsu Ishizawa and Yuji Nagata. Nagata delivered a belly-to-belly suplex from the top rope to Kanemoto for the win.

Next, an eight-man tag team match took place in which NJPW's Osamu Nishimura, Riki Choshu, Satoshi Kojima and Takashi Iizuka took on Heisei Ishingun (Akira Nogami, Akitoshi Saito, Michiyoshi Ohara and Shiro Koshinaka). Choshu delivered a Riki Lariat to Nogami for the win.

Next, Jushin Liger defended the IWGP Junior Heavyweight Championship against The Great Sasuke. Sasuke delivered a hurricanrana, a one shoulder powerbomb and a double chickenwing suplex for the win.

It was followed by a match between WCW's Randy Savage and Ookami Gundan's Hiroyoshi Tenzan. Savage pinned Tenzan with an inside cradle after delivering three Savage Elbows.

In the next match, WCW's Lex Luger took on Ookami Gundan's Masahiro Chono. Chono made Luger submit to the STF after hitting a Yakuza Kick and an inverted atomic drop.

It was followed by a six-man tag team match, in which The Road Warriors (Animal Warrior, Hawk Warrior and Power Warrior) took on Scott Norton and The Steiner Brothers (Rick Steiner and Scott Steiner). Animal delivered an Oklahoma Stampede to Rick from the middle rope onto the floor for the win.

Later, The Great Muta took on Jinsei Shinzaki. Muta countered a Nenbutsu Powerbomb by Shinzaki by spraying a mist and then hit a chop to drop Shinzaki on the floor and delivered a moonsault to Shinzaki for the win.

It was followed by the penultimate match, in which Tatsumi Fujinami took on Genichiro Tenryu. Tenryu avoided a diving knee drop by Fujinami and hit a series of lariats to Fujinami for the win.

=== Main event match ===
In the main event, Nobuhiko Takada defended the IWGP Heavyweight Championship against Shinya Hashimoto. After failing at an attempt to hit a brainbuster, Hashimoto delivered a DDT to Takada and delivered a brainbuster to Takada and then applied a triangle choke to Takada to make him submit to win the match and become the new IWGP Heavyweight Champion.

== Reception ==
Jason Manning of Puroresu Central praised the event as "so really great to watch" with specific praise towards "the Sasuke/Liger and Hash/Takada matches", which he felt as "must-see professional wrestling". According to him, the match between Genichiro Tenryu and Tatsumi Fujinami was a bout "you really need to check out". He directed his only criticism towards "Savage/Tenzan and the first couple minutes of Chono/Luger".

Danny Djeljosevic of The Sportster praised the main event as "a classic where the stakes are so high that the crowd goes BALLISTIC any time Hashimoto lands a strike."

== Results ==
No.	Results	Stipulations	Times
1	Tokimitsu Ishizawa and Yuji Nagata defeated Koji Kanemoto and Shinjiro Otani	Tag team match	11:20
2	Osamu Nishimura, Riki Choshu, Satoshi Kojima and Takashi Iizuka defeated Heisei Ishingun (Akira Nogami, Akitoshi Saito, Michiyoshi Ohara and Shiro Koshinaka) (with Kuniaki Kobayashi and Tatsutoshi Goto)	Eight-man tag team match	11:04
3	The Great Sasuke defeated Jushin Liger (c)	Singles match for the IWGP Junior Heavyweight Championship	19:27
4	Randy Savage defeated Hiroyoshi Tenzan	Singles match	9:49
5	Masahiro Chono defeated Lex Luger	Singles match	14:37
6	The Road Warriors (Animal Warrior, Hawk Warrior and Power Warrior) defeated Scott Norton and The Steiner Brothers (Rick Steiner and Scott Steiner)	Six-man tag team match	15:17
7	The Great Muta defeated Jinsei Shinzaki	Singles match	19:44
8	Genichiro Tenryu defeated Tatsumi Fujinami	Singles match	9:16
9	Shinya Hashimoto defeated Nobuhiko Takada (c)	Singles match for the IWGP Heavyweight Championship	12:53
(c) / – the champion(s) heading into the match
