= Wrestling World 1997 =

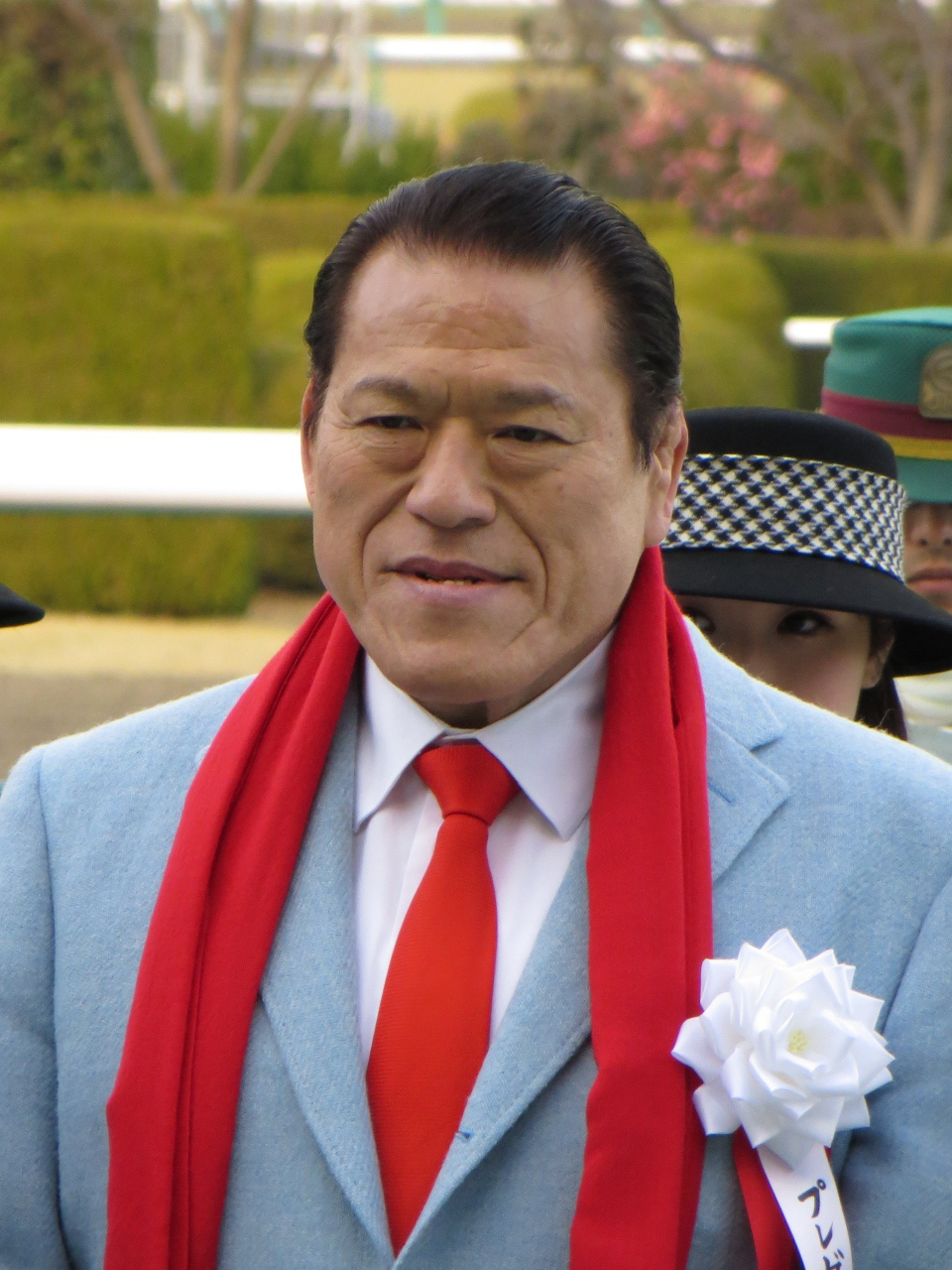
- Antonio Inoki, who defeated Willie Williams at the event.
- Promotion(s): New Japan Pro-Wrestling; Big Japan Pro Wrestling
- Date: January 4, 1997
- City: Tokyo, Japan
- Venue: Tokyo Dome
- Attendance: 62,500 (official); 52,500 (claimed)

January 4 Tokyo Dome Show chronology
← Previous; Wrestling World	Next → Final Power Hall in Tokyo Dome

New Japan Pro-Wrestling events chronology
← Previous; Battle Formation 1996	Next → Battle Formation 1997

Wrestling World 1997 was a professional wrestling television special event co-produced by the New Japan Pro-Wrestling (NJPW) and Big Japan Pro Wrestling (BJW) promotions. It took place on January 4, 1997 in the Tokyo Dome. Officially, the show drew 62,500 spectators and $5,000,000 in ticket sales. The show featured 12 matches, including four matches that were promoted jointly with the BJW promotion and presented as a rivalry between the two promotions. The show featured 12 matches in total, including three title matches, two of which saw new champions crowned.

== Production ==
=== Background ===
The January 4 Tokyo Dome Show is NJPW's biggest annual event and has been called "the largest professional wrestling show in the world outside of the United States" and the "Japanese equivalent to the Super Bowl".

=== Storylines ===
Wrestling World 1997 featured professional wrestling matches that involved different wrestlers from pre-existing scripted feuds and storylines. Wrestlers portrayed villains, heroes, or less distinguishable characters in scripted events that built tension and culminated in a wrestling match or series of matches.

== Event ==
=== Preliminary matches ===
The first match of the show was an eight-man tag team match which on one side featured Junji Hirata, Satoshi Kojima, Manabu Nakanishi and Osamu Nishimura going against Takashi Iizuka, Osamu Kido, Yuji Nagata and Kazuo Yamazaki. The contest lasted for 11:21 before Junji Hirata pinned Yuji Nagata after striking him with a lariat. This was the last match Nagata wrestled in Japan before travelling to the United States to work for World Championship Wrestling (WCW) as part of an "educational tour" that a lot of young Japanese wrestlers undertake to learn various styles of wrestling.

The second match of the night featured the debut of a character called "Super Liger", a silver and white version of Jushin Thunder Liger played by Chris Jericho. Super Liger wrestled Koji Kanemoto in what Power Slam Magazine correspondent Rob Butcher called "A super aerial battle". Super Liger won after 11 minutes and 11 seconds of action by using a bridging tiger suplex to pin Kanemoto. NJPW intended to use "Super Liger" character as a storyline enemy of Jushin Thunder Liger, hoping to create a rivalry similar to the Tiger Mask vs. Black Tiger rivalry. However, the character was so poorly received that it was never used again.

In the third match freelancer Jinsei Shinzaki defeated longtime NJPW midcarder Michiyoshi Ohara after using the Nenbutsu powerbomb.

Matches four, five, six and seven featured a "NJPW vs. BJW" premise as wrestlers representing the two companies wrestled against each other. In previous years NJPW had great success promoting "inter-promotional rivalries" against UWF International, only this time they were working with the much smaller BJW. In the first match Shinjiro Otani defeated Yoshihiro Tajiri after a flying heel kick in what was described as the best contest of the NJPW vs. BJW series. Kendo Nagasaki defeated Tatsutoshi Goto to even the score to 1–1. NJPW headliner Masahiro Chono made very short work of BJW wrestler Shoji Nakamaki, defeating him with a Yakuza kick in just over a minute. The final match of the series saw NJPW veteran Masa Saito defeat BJW president Shinya Kojika, who wrestled under the ring name The Great Kojika, to win the series 3 to 1.

Match number eight was billed as a Mixed martial arts match although it was still as predetermined as all the other matches of the night. NJPW founder Antonio Inoki took on karateka Willie Williams in a rematch of a highly publicized match from 1980. In the end Inoki forced Williams to submit to a ground cobra twist after 4:19.

The ninth match of the evening was originally supposed be for nine championships in total, but at the last minute WCW had not allowed Último Dragón to put the WCW World Cruiserweight Championship on the line in the match, Dragón still defended the J-Crown Championship, a championship consisting of eight unified titles. His opponent of the night was Jushin Thunder Liger, the driving force behind NJPW's very successful Light Heavyweight division and multiple time IWGP Junior Heavyweight Championship holder, a belt that at the time was part of the J-Crown. Liger and Dragón had previously wrestled at the 1993 January 4 Tokyo Dome show called Fantastic Story in Tokyo Dome. After over 18 minutes of high flying wrestling Liger pinned Dragón following a Steiner Screwdriver to become the fourth J-Crown holder.

The storyline going into the tenth match of the evening was that of the first ever holders of the IWGP Tag Team Championship wanted "one last chance at the title that made them famous" before retirement. Fujinami and Kimura took on Hiroyoshi Tenzan and Masahiro Chono (who had already wrestled that night, albeit in a very short match) for the IWGP Tag Team Championship. While the age of the challengers prevented the match from being a good wrestling match the antics of Tenzan and Chono and the emotion of the challengers "last stand" created a match the crowd in the Tokyo Dome enjoyed. The end came after Tenzan accidentally hit his partner, allowing Fujinami to apply a dragon sleeper on Chono to force him to submit. With this victory Fujinami and Kimura became four-time tag team champions and the 29th overall champions.

The semi-main event of the evening was billed as a "battle of the alter egos" as Keiji Mutoh reverted to his "Great Muta" character and Kensuke Sasaki wrestled as "Power Warrior". While Mutoh and Sasaki tended to wrestle a more scientific style their face painted alter egos tended to brawl more. The match quickly turned into more of a brawl than a wrestling match with both participants using the ringside tables and a steel chair during the match. Power Warrior won after moving out of the way of a Moonsault from Muta allowing him to drive Muta into a table with his Northern Lights bomb for the victory.

=== Main event ===
The main event of the show featured the same "last stand" storyline that was used in the tag team title match as NJPW veteran Riki Choshu challenged Shinya Hashimoto for the IWGP Heavyweight Championship. In August, 1996 Choshu had surprisingly defeated Hashimoto during the 1996 G1 Climax tournament. Unlike their encounter in 1996 and unlike the tag team championship match the "legend" did not prevail in this match as Hashimoto pinned Choshu after a brainbuster following 18:04 of wrestling.

== Results ==
No.	Results	Stipulations	Times
1	Junji Hirata, Manabu Nakanishi, Osamu Nishimura and Satoshi Kojima defeated Kazuo Yamazaki, Osamu Kido, Takayuki Iizuka and Yuji Nagata	Eight-man tag team match	11:21
2	Super Liger defeated Koji Kanemoto	Singles match	11:11
3	Jinsei Shinzaki defeated Michiyoshi Ohara	Singles match	09:17
4	Shinjiro Otani defeated Yoshihiro Tajiri	Singles match: NJPW (1) vs. BJW (0)	08:30
5	Kendo Nagasaki defeated Tatsutoshi Goto	Singles match: NJPW (1) vs. BJW (1)	09:23
6	Masahiro Chono defeated Shoji Nakamaki	Singles match: NJPW (2) vs. BJW (1)	01:07
7	Masa Saito defeated Shinya Kojika	Singles match: NJPW (3) vs. BJW (1)	04:25
8	Antonio Inoki defeated Willie Williams	Mixed martial arts match	04:19
9	Jushin Thunder Liger defeated Último Dragón (c)	Singles match for the J-Crown Championship	18:21
10	Kengo Kimura and Tatsumi Fujinami defeated Cho-Ten (Hiroyoshi Tenzan and Masahiro Chono) (c)	Tag team match for the IWGP Tag Team Championship	16:10
11	Power Warrior defeated The Great Muta	Singles match	16:09
12	Shinya Hashimoto (c) defeated Riki Choshu	Singles match for the IWGP Heavyweight Championship	18:04
(c) / – the champion(s) heading into the match
