= NJPW Battle Formation =

New Japan Pro-Wrestling event series

Battle Formation
- Promotions: New Japan Pro-Wrestling
- First event: 1996
- Last event: 1997

Battle Formation was an annual professional wrestling event promoted by New Japan Pro-Wrestling (NJPW). The event took place at the Tokyo Dome during the month of April in 1996 and 1997. It was a major event, drawing over 60,000 fans in attendance during both editions. Shinya Hashimoto headlined both editions, cementing his status as the ace of NJPW during that period.

== Events ==
#	Event	Date	City	Venue	Attendance	Main event	Ref(s)
1	Battle Formation (1996)	April 29, 1996	Tokyo, Japan	Tokyo Dome	65,000	Nobuhiko Takada (c) vs. Shinya Hashimoto for the IWGP Heavyweight Championship	
2	Battle Formation (1997)	April 12, 1997	Tokyo, Japan	Tokyo Dome	60,500	Naoya Ogawa vs. Shinya Hashimoto in a Different Style Fight	

== Results ==
=== 1996 ===
The 1996 event was held on April 29, 1996 at the Tokyo Dome in Tokyo, Japan. It was a major success with a crowd of estimated 60,000 people and an approximate revenue of $5,700,000 from ticket sales. The event featured competitors from various promotions including Michinoku Pro Wrestling, New Japan Pro-Wrestling, Union of Wrestling Forces International, World Championship Wrestling and Wrestle Association R.

Battle Formation was headlined by an IWGP Heavyweight Championship match in which NJPW representative Shinya Hashimoto defeated the defending champion Nobuhiko Takada, who represented UWFI. The match was significant for storyline purposes as the title change was responsible in bringing the title back to NJPW after Takada claimed the title by beating The Great Muta at Wrestling World and took the title to UWFI. It has been considered as one of the best IWGP Heavyweight Championship title changes by Danny Djeljosevic of The Sportster, who reviewed it as "a classic where the stakes are so high that the crowd goes BALLISTIC any time Hashimoto lands a strike."

Another title change occurred at the event when The Great Sasuke defeated Jushin Liger to win the IWGP Junior Heavyweight Championship. The event featured many other major matches including an eight-man tag team match, in which NJPW representatives Osamu Nishimura, Riki Choshu, Satoshi Kojima and Takashi Iizuka defeated Heisei Ishingun (Akira Nogami, Akitoshi Saito, Michiyoshi Ohara and Shiro Koshinaka), a series of interpromotional matches between WCW wrestlers and NJPW faction Ookami Gundan members, and main event calibre matches pitting Tatsumi Fujinami against Genichiro Tenryu from WAR and The Great Muta against Jinsei Shinzaki from Michinoku Pro.

=== 1997 ===
The 1997 event took place on April 12, 1997 at the Tokyo Dome in Tokyo, Japan. It was a massive success, drawing a crowd of about 60,000 fans and the revenue generated from ticket sales amounted to $5,000,000.

It was headlined by a Different Style Fight, which featured the professional wrestling debut of former judoka Naoya Ogawa, who won seven medals in the World Judo Championships and a silver medal in the 1992 Summer Olympics. Ogawa was brought in as a replacement for Ken Shamrock and took on the IWGP Heavyweight Champion Shinya Hashimoto. Ogawa got a shocking upset win by knocking out Hashimoto with a choke. The result set the stage for a lengthy rivalry between the two that resulted in a series of matches.

The undercard of the event featured two championship matches, in which Jushin Liger retained the J-Crown Championship against The Great Sasuke, while Kensuke Sasaki and Riki Choshu defeated Kengo Kimura and Tatsumi Fujinami to win the IWGP Tag Team Championship. Other prominent matches included Antonio Inoki's second last singles match of his career against Tiger King, The Great Muta taking on Masahiro Chono, and a continuation of the real-life WCW feud between Chris Benoit and Kevin Sullivan.
