= Strong Style Evolution =

- Promotion: New Japan Pro-Wrestling
- Date: May 3, 1997
- City: Osaka, Japan
- Venue: Osaka Dome
- Attendance: 53,000

New Japan Pro-Wrestling events chronology
← Previous; Battle Formation 1997	Next → Final Power Hall in Tokyo Dome

Strong Style Evolution was a professional wrestling television special event produced by New Japan Pro-Wrestling (NJPW). It took place on May 3, 1997 at the Osaka Dome in Osaka, Japan.

Ten professional wrestling matches were contested at the event. In the main event, Shinya Hashimoto defeated Naoya Ogawa via submission to retain the IWGP Heavyweight Championship.

Other major featured matches on the card included Kensuke Sasaki and Riki Choshu versus Bull Powers (Manabu Nakanishi and Satoshi Kojima) for the IWGP Tag Team Championship, Antonio Inoki and Tiger King versus Jushin Liger and Yoshiaki Fujiwara, Lex Luger and The Giant versus Buff Bagwell and Scott Norton, and Keiji Muto and The Steiner Brothers (Rick Steiner and Scott Steiner) versus Masahiro Chono and The Outsiders (Kevin Nash and Scott Hall) in a six-man tag team match. The event also featured the return of Tokimitsu Ishizawa, who debuted the character Kendo Kashin in NJPW against Kazuo Yamazaki in a losing effort.

== Background ==
At Battle Formation, Naoya Ogawa made his IWGP debut against the IWGP Heavyweight Champion Shinya Hashimoto in a non-title Different Style Fight. Ogawa shocked the crowd by knocking out Hashimoto with a choke and getting the upset win over the champion. This win earned Ogawa, a title shot against Hashimoto for the Heavyweight Championship at Strong Style Evolution.

== Event ==
=== Preliminary matches ===
The event started with a two out of three falls ten-man tag team match pitting Kaientai DX (Dick Togo, Hanzo Nakajima and Men's Teioh), Koji Kanemoto and Shinjiro Otani against the team of El Samurai, Gran Hamada, Norio Honaga, Super Delfin and The Great Sasuke. Kanemoto claimed the first fall for his team by pinning Delfin after a double chickenwing suplex. The second fall was scored when Togo delivered a diving senton to Honaga after a powerslam.

In the following match, Tokimitsu Ishizawa made his return to NJPW as "Kendo Kashin" against Kazuo Yamazaki. Yamazaki made Kashin submit to the sleeper hold for the win.

Next, Kengo Kimura took on Shiro Koshinaka. After countering a back body drop by Kimura, Koshinaka hit a diving hip attack and a powerbomb for the win.

Next, Tatsumi Fujinami took on Hiroyoshi Tenzan. Fujinami made Tenzan submit to the Cobra Twist for the win.

Next, Tadao Yasuda and Takashi Iizuka took on nWo Sting and Syxx in the first New Japan versus nWo series of matches of the event. Syxx delivered a Northern Lights suplex to Yasuda for the win.

Next, Lex Luger and The Giant represented WCW against nWo's Buff Bagwell and Scott Norton. Luger applied a Torture Rack on Norton to score the win but Hiro Saito and Hiroyoshi Tenzan interfered in the match, allowing Norton to hit an elbow drop to Luger for the win. Saito and Tenzan would then confirm their allegiance to nWo Japan as the newest members of the faction.

Later, a match took place pitting NJPW's Keiji Muto and WCW's The Steiner Brothers (Rick Steiner and Scott Steiner) took on nWo's Masahiro Chono and The Outsiders (Kevin Nash and Scott Hall). Nash delivered a Jackknife Powerbomb to Rick for the win.

It was followed by a match pitting Antonio Inoki and Tiger King against Jushin Liger and Yoshiaki Fujiwara. Inoki made Fujiwara submit to the sleeper hold for the win.

The following match was the penultimate match, in which Kensuke Sasaki and Riki Choshu defended the IWGP Tag Team Championship against Bull Powers (Manabu Nakanishi and Satoshi Kojima). The match ended in a double submission as Nakanishi had applied a backbreaker rack on Sasaki while Kojima made Choshu submit to the dragon sleeper for the win. As a result, Bull Powers won the Tag Team Championship.

=== Main event match ===
In the main event, Shinya Hashimoto defended the IWGP Heavyweight Championship against Naoya Ogawa. Hashimoto eventually hit a massive kick to Ogawa's head to knock him out and Satoru Sayama threw in the towel on behalf of Ogawa. As a result, Hashimoto won the match and retained the title.

== Reception ==
Strong Style Evolution was a major success, drawing a crowd of 53,000 fans, with an estimated revenue of $4,000,000 from ticket sales.

According to Jason Manning of Puroresu Central, the event was a "fun show to just sit back, watch, and suck in its greatness." He believed that almost all of the matches were "for the most part fun minus the (Kendo) Kashin match" and had specific praise for the opening ten-man tag team match as "must-see wrestling for everyone".

== Aftermath ==
Bull Powers held the IWGP Tag Team Championship for the next three months until Kensuke Sasaki regained the titles with Kazuo Yamazaki by defeating Bull Powers for the titles at The Four Heaven.

Shinya Hashimoto and Naoya Ogawa resumed their rivalry in 1998 and a rubber match between the two took place at Wrestling World 1999, which ended in a no contest. A rematch occurred at Final Dome, where Ogawa retained the NWA World Heavyweight Championship against Hashimoto by knocking him out with stiff kicks, forcing the referee Tatsumi Fujinami to stop the match. Ogawa finally defeated Hashimoto for a decisive win at Dome Impact to end the rivalry.

== Results ==
No.	Results	Stipulations	Times
1	Kaientai DX (Dick Togo, Hanzo Nakajima and Men's Teioh), Koji Kanemoto and Shinjiro Otani defeated El Samurai, Gran Hamada, Norio Honaga, Super Delfin and The Great Sasuke (2:0)	Two out of three falls ten-man tag team match	19:11
2	Kazuo Yamazaki defeated Kendo Kashin	Singles match	8:06
3	Shiro Koshinaka defeated Kengo Kimura	Singles match	13:34
4	Tatsumi Fujinami defeated Hiroyoshi Tenzan	Singles match	9:03
5	nWo Sting and Syxx defeated Tadao Yasuda and Takashi Iizuka	Tag team match	12:23
6	Buff Bagwell and Scott Norton defeated Lex Luger and The Giant	Tag team match	10:09
7	Masahiro Chono and The Outsiders (Kevin Nash and Scott Hall) defeated Keiji Muto and The Steiner Brothers (Rick Steiner and Scott Steiner)	Six-man tag team match	14:31
8	Antonio Inoki and Tiger King defeated Jushin Liger and Yoshiaki Fujiwara	Tag team match	10:42
9	Bull Powers (Manabu Nakanishi and Satoshi Kojima) defeated Kensuke Sasaki and Riki Choshu (c)	Tag team match for the IWGP Tag Team Championship	11:34
10	Shinya Hashimoto (c) defeated Naoya Ogawa by knockout	Singles match for the IWGP Heavyweight Championship	10:20
(c) / – the champion(s) heading into the match
