= NJPW Final Dome =

1999 New Japan Pro-Wrestling event

Final Dome
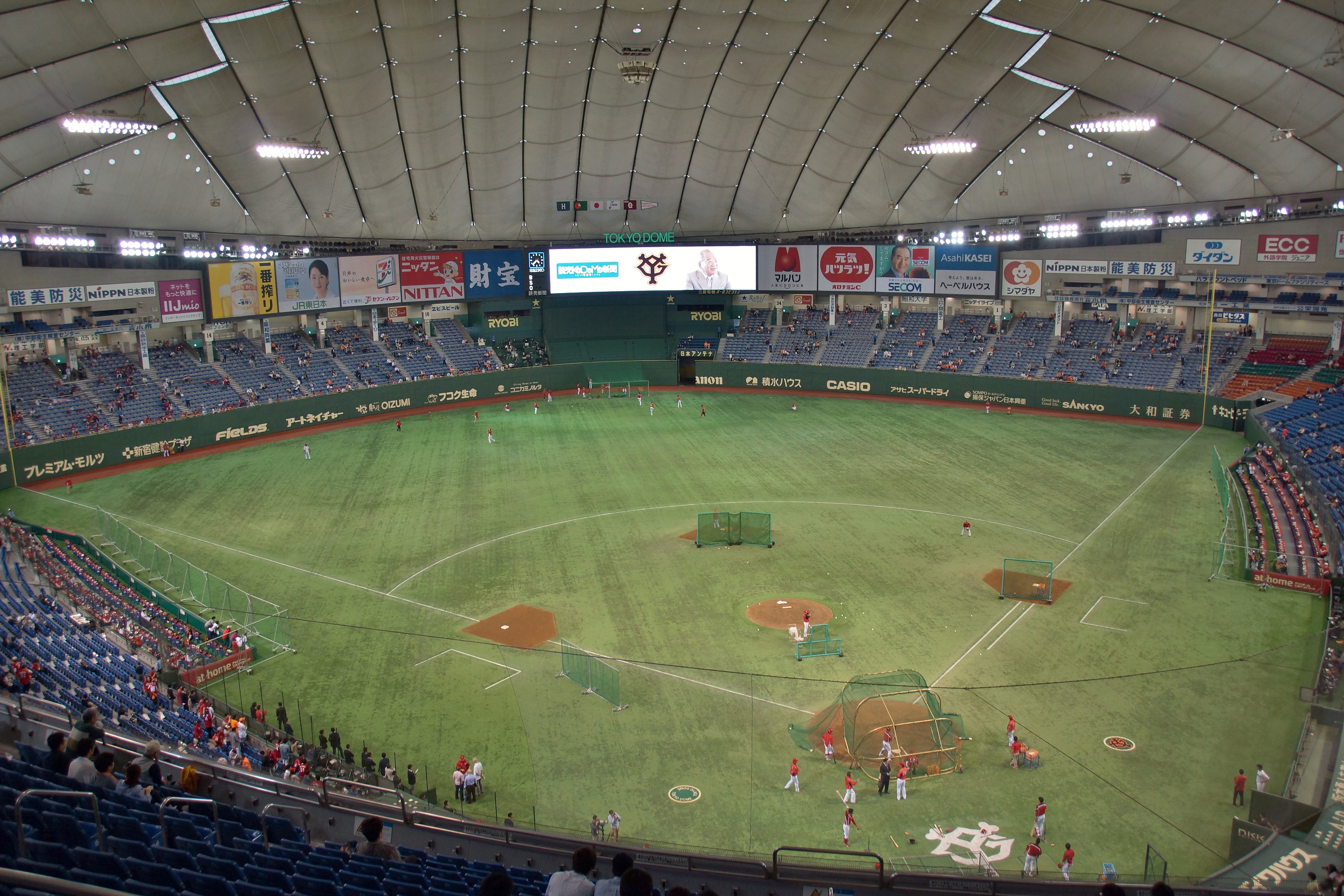
- Tokyo Dome, the venue of the event
- Promotion: New Japan Pro-Wrestling
- Date: October 11, 1999
- City: Tokyo, Japan
- Venue: Tokyo Dome
- Attendance: 48,000

Event chronology
← Previous; Jingu Climax	Next → Wrestling World 2000

Final Dome was a major professional wrestling television special event produced by New Japan Pro-Wrestling (NJPW). It took place on October 12, 1999 at the Tokyo Dome in Tokyo, Japan and was televised live on TV Asahi.

Ten professional wrestling matches were contested at the event. The event featured a dual main event; the first main event was for the IWGP Heavyweight Championship in which Keiji Mutoh retained the title against Manabu Nakanishi and the second main event was for the NWA World Heavyweight Championship in which Naoya Ogawa retained the title against Shinya Hashimoto, with Tatsumi Fujinami serving as the special guest referee. In other prominent matches on the undercard, Genichiro Tenryu defeated Kensuke Sasaki, Team 2000 (Don Frye and Masahiro Chono) defeated nWo Japan (Satoshi Kojima and Scott Norton) and Jushin Liger defeated Kendo Kashin to win the IWGP Junior Heavyweight Championship while Shinjiro Otani and Tatsuhito Takaiwa retained the IWGP Junior Heavyweight Tag Team Championship against Junior Stars (Koji Kanemoto and Minoru Tanaka).

== Production ==
=== Storylines ===
The main event of the event pitted the defending champion Naoya Ogawa against Shinya Hashimoto for the NWA World Heavyweight Championship. The lengthy rivalry between Ogawa and Hashimoto began at Battle Formation on April 12, 1997, where Ogawa pulled out an upset victory in his debut match against Hashimoto by knocking him out with a choke in a different style fight. This earned Ogawa, a title shot against Hashimoto for the latter's IWGP Heavyweight Championship, the following month at Strong Style Evolution, where Hashimoto retained the title. The duo had a rubber match at the 1999 Wrestling World event, where they fought to a no contest after Ogawa hit Hashimoto viciously and knocked him out. The feud further escalated when Hashimoto attacked Ogawa at a press conference in the United States after Ogawa won the NWA World Heavyweight Championship, thus setting up a match between the two for the latter's title at Final Dome.

A second main event of Final Dome was between Keiji Mutoh and Manabu Nakanishi for the former's IWGP Heavyweight Championship. On August 15, Nakanishi defeated Mutoh in the finals of the 1999 G1 Climax to win the tournament, thus earning a future title shot against Mutoh. This set up a title match between the two at Final Dome.

== Event ==
=== Preliminary matches ===
The event kicked off with a match between Hiroyoshi Tenzan and Tatsutoshi Goto. Tenzan won the match by performing a diving headbutt on Goto.

Next, Kazuyuki Fujita took on Sean McCully. Fujita won the match by making McCully submit to the Achilles tendon hold.

Next, the team of Shinjiro Otani and Tatsuhito Takaiwa defended the IWGP Junior Heavyweight Tag Team Championship against Junior Stars (Koji Kanemoto and Minoru Tanaka). Otani delivered a Spiral Bomb to Kanemoto to win the match and retain the titles.

Next, Kendo Kashin defended the IWGP Junior Heavyweight Championship against Jushin Liger. Liger nailed a fisherman buster to Kashin to win the title.

Next, the team of Shiro Koshinaka and Tatsumi Fujinami took on Osamu Kido and Takashi Iizuka in a tag team match. Koshinaka executed a powerbomb on Iizuka for the win.

Next, Yuji Nagata took on Kimo. Kimo won the match via submission by applying a sleeper hold on Nagata.

Next, Team 2000 representatives Don Frye and Masahiro Chono took on the nWo Japan representatives Satoshi Kojima and Scott Norton in a tag team match. Chono made Kojima submit to the STF for the win.

Later, Kensuke Sasaki took on Wrestle Association R representative Genichiro Tenryu in an interpromotional match. Tenryu nailed a scoop brainbuster on Sasaki for the win.

The penultimate match was for the IWGP Heavyweight Championship, in which Keiji Mutoh defended the title against G1 Climax winner Manabu Nakanishi. Mutoh made Nakanishi submit to the cross armbreaker to retain the title.

=== Main event match ===
In the main event, Naoya Ogawa defended the NWA World Heavyweight Championship against Shinya Hashimoto, with Tatsumi Fujinami serving as the special guest referee. Hashimoto was knocked out after a series of stiff kicks and punches by Ogawa, which resulted in Fujinami stopping the match and Ogawa was awarded the victory and thus retained the title.

== Aftermath ==
The feud between Naoya Ogawa and Shinya Hashimoto continued after Final Dome as the two squared off in a tag team match on opposite sides at Wrestling World 2000, where Ogawa teamed with Kazunari Murakami and Hashimoto teamed with Takashi Iizuka. Hashimoto and Iizuka won the match. Ogawa and Hashimoto had one final encounter at Dome Impact, which Ogawa won to end the feud.

Minoru Tanaka would challenge Shinjiro Otani and Tatsuhito Takaiwa for the Junior Heavyweight Tag Team Championship, with Kendo Kashin as his partner at Wrestling World but failed to win the titles. Tanaka would then receive a Final Dome rematch with Koji Kanemoto against Otani and Takaiwa on June 25, where they won the titles.

== Results ==
No.	Results	Stipulations	Times
1	Hiroyoshi Tenzan defeated Tatsutoshi Goto	Singles match	10:13
2	Kazuyuki Fujita defeated Sean McCully via submission	Singles match	2:35
3	Shinjiro Otani and Tatsuhito Takaiwa (c) defeated Junior Stars (Koji Kanemoto and Minoru Tanaka)	Tag team match for the IWGP Junior Heavyweight Tag Team Championship	18:32
4	Jushin Liger defeated Kendo Kashin (c)	Singles match for the IWGP Junior Heavyweight Championship	16:08
5	Shiro Koshinaka and Tatsumi Fujinami defeated Osamu Kido and Takashi Iizuka	Tag team match	9:31
6	Kimo defeated Yuji Nagata via submission	Singles match	3:54
7	Team 2000 (Don Frye and Masahiro Chono) defeated nWo Japan (Satoshi Kojima and Scott Norton) via submission	Tag team match	17:01
8	Genichiro Tenryu defeated Kensuke Sasaki	Singles match	14:49
9	Keiji Mutoh (c) defeated Manabu Nakanishi via submission	Singles match for the IWGP Heavyweight Championship	20:00
10	Naoya Ogawa (c) defeated Shinya Hashimoto by referee's decision	Singles match for the NWA World Heavyweight Championship with Tatsumi Fujinami as the special guest referee	13:10
(c) / – the champion(s) heading into the match
