= Final Power Hall in Tokyo Dome =

- Promotional poster featuring Riki Choshu
- Promotion: New Japan Pro-Wrestling
- Date: January 4, 1998
- City: Tokyo, Japan
- Venue: Tokyo Dome
- Attendance: 55,000

January 4 Tokyo Dome Show chronology
← Previous; Wrestling World	Next → Wrestling World

New Japan Pro-Wrestling events chronology
← Previous; Strong Style Evolution	Next → Wrestling World 1999

Final Power Hall in Tokyo Dome was a professional wrestling television special event produced by New Japan Pro-Wrestling (NJPW). It took place on January 4, 1998 in the Tokyo Dome. Final Power Hall in Tokyo Dome was the seventh January 4 Tokyo Dome Show held by NJPW. The show drew 55,000 spectators and $6,000,000 in ticket sales.

One of the focal points of the show was the retirement of wrestling legend Riki Choshu, who would wrestle five times that night against select opponents in what was billed as the Riki Road Final Message 5, the completion of a months-long "retirement tour" for Choshu. The show also featured successful defenses of the IWGP Junior Heavyweight Championship and the IWGP Heavyweight Championship, which made Final Power Hall in Tokyo Dome the first January 4 Tokyo Dome show to not have a single championship change hands. Besides the five Riki Road Final Message 5 matches the show featured eight additional matches.

== Production ==
=== Background ===
The January 4 Tokyo Dome Show is NJPW's biggest annual event and has been called "the largest professional wrestling show in the world outside of the United States" and the "Japanese equivalent to the Super Bowl".

=== Storylines ===
Final Power Hall in Tokyo Dome featured professional wrestling matches that involved different wrestlers from pre-existing scripted feuds and storylines. Wrestlers portrayed villains, heroes, or less distinguishable characters in scripted events that built tension and culminated in a wrestling match or series of matches.

== Results ==
No.	Results	Stipulations	Times
1	Kendo Kashin defeated Koji Kanemoto	Singles match	12:01
2	Shinjiro Otani (c) defeated Último Dragón	Singles match for the IWGP Junior Heavyweight Championship	17:06
3	Yuji Nagata defeated Hiroyoshi Tenzan	Singles match	11:33
4	Osamu Nishimura and Tatsumi Fujinami defeated Manabu Nakanishi and Satoshi Kojima	Tag team match	12:39
5	Riki Choshu defeated Kazuyuki Fujita	Singles match: Riki Road Final Message 5	03:57
6	Riki Choshu defeated Yutaka Yoshie	Singles match: Riki Road Final Message 5	01:42
7	Riki Choshu defeated Tatsuhito Takaiwa	Singles match: Riki Road Final Message 5	01:21
8	Takashi Iizuka defeated Riki Choshu	Singles match: Riki Road Final Message 5	02:02
9	Riki Choshu defeated Jushin Thunder Liger	Singles match: Riki Road Final Message 5	05:09
10	Don Frye defeated Naoya Ogawa via referee stoppage	Singles match	08:47
11	Shinya Hashimoto defeated Dennis Lane via referee stoppage	Singles match	01:34
12	Masahiro Chono defeated Shiro Koshinaka	Singles match	15:05
13	Kensuke Sasaki (c) defeated Keiji Mutoh (with Hiro Saito and Hiroyoshi Tenzan)	Singles match for the IWGP Heavyweight Championship	25:18
(c) / – the champion(s) heading into the match
