= Battle Formation (1997) =

Battle Formation 1997
- Promotion: New Japan Pro-Wrestling
- Date: April 12, 1997
- City: Tokyo, Japan
- Venue: Tokyo Dome
- Attendance: 50,500–60,500

Battle Formation chronology
← Previous; 1996	Next → Last

New Japan Pro-Wrestling events chronology
← Previous; Wrestling World 1997	Next → Strong Style Evolution

The 1997 Battle Formation was the second and final Battle Formation television special event produced by New Japan Pro-Wrestling, which took place on April 12, 1997 at the Tokyo Dome in Tokyo, Japan. It was a massive success, drawing a crowd of about 60,000 fans and the revenue generated from ticket sales amounted to $5,000,000.

Ten professional wrestling matches occurred at the event. The main event was a non-title Different Style Fight, in which the IWGP Heavyweight Champion Shinya Hashimoto took on the debuting Naoya Ogawa, a former judoka who won seven medals in the World Judo Championships and a silver medal in the 1992 Summer Olympics. Ogawa got a shocking upset win by knocking out Hashimoto with a choke. The result set the stage for a lengthy rivalry between the two that resulted in a series of matches.

The undercard of the event featured two championship matches, in which Jushin Liger retained the J-Crown Championship against The Great Sasuke, while Kensuke Sasaki and Riki Choshu defeated Kengo Kimura and Tatsumi Fujinami to win the IWGP Tag Team Championship. Other prominent matches included Antonio Inoki's second last singles match of his career against Tiger King, The Great Muta taking on Masahiro Chono, and a continuation of the real-life WCW feud between Chris Benoit and Kevin Sullivan.

== Event ==
=== Preliminary matches ===
In the opening match, Hiroyoshi Tenzan took on Manabu Nakanishi. Tenzan delivered a diving headbutt to Nakanishi.

Next, El Samurai took on Shinjiro Otani. Samurai delivered an inverted DDT to Otani for the win.

Next, a match took place pitting World Championship Wrestling competitors Chris Benoit and Kevin Sullivan against each other. Benoit delivered a diving splash to Sullivan for the win.

Next, the team of Junji Hirata and Satoshi Kojima took on Kazuo Yamazaki and Osamu Kido. Kojima delivered a Stretch Bomb to Kido for the win.

Next, Shiro Koshinaka took on Takashi Ishikawa. Koshinaka delivered a diving hip attack to Ishikawa for the win.

It was followed by the first championship match in NJPW as Jushin Liger defended the J-Crown Championship against The Great Sasuke. Liger delivered a brainbuster to Sasuke from the top rope for the win.

Next, Antonio Inoki wrestled in his second-to-last singles match against Tiger King. Inoki made King submit to the Cobra Twist for the win.

Later, The Great Muta took on Masahiro Chono. Muta delivered a moonsault to Chono for the win.

It was followed by the penultimate match, in which Kengo Kimura and Tatsumi Fujinami defended the IWGP Tag Team Championship against Kensuke Sasaki and Riki Choshu. Choshu delivered a Riki Lariat to Kimura to win the match, resulting in Choshu and Sasaki winning the Tag Team Championship.

=== Main event match ===
Shinya Hashimoto took on the debuting Naoya Ogawa in the main event, a Different Style Fight. Ogawa won by knocking out Hashimoto with a sleeper hold.

== Aftermath ==
Naoya Ogawa's upset win over Shinya Hashimoto earned him a title shot for the latter's IWGP Heavyweight Championship at Strong Style Evolution. Hashimoto retained the title by knocking out Ogawa with a massive kick to the head.

Following their match at Battle Formation, Antonio Inoki and Tiger King teamed with each other as they took on Jushin Liger and Yoshiaki Fujiwara at Strong Style Evolution. Inoki and King won the match.

The rivalry between The Great Muta and Masahiro Chono continued as Muta competed under his real name Keiji Muto, representing NJPW, and teamed with WCW representatives The Steiner Brothers to take on nWo's Chono and The Outsiders in a six-man tag team match at Strong Style Evolution. nWo won the match.

== Results ==
No.	Results	Stipulations	Times
1	Hiroyoshi Tenzan defeated Manabu Nakanishi	Singles match	14:29
2	El Samurai defeated Shinjiro Otani	Singles match	13:51
3	Chris Benoit (with Woman) defeated Kevin Sullivan (with Jacqueline)	Singles match	9:17
4	Junji Hirata and Satoshi Kojima defeated Kazuo Yamazaki and Osamu Kido	Tag team match	10:18
5	Shiro Koshinaka defeated Takashi Ishikawa	Singles match	11:16
6	Jushin Liger (c) defeated The Great Sasuke	Singles match for the J-Crown Championship	20:08
7	Antonio Inoki defeated Tiger King	Singles match	6:46
8	The Great Muta defeated Masahiro Chono	Singles match	14:09
9	Kensuke Sasaki and Riki Choshu defeated Kengo Kimura and Tatsumi Fujinami (c)	Tag team match for the IWGP Tag Team Championship	15:31
10	Naoya Ogawa defeated Shinya Hashimoto by referee's decision	Different Style Fight	9:25
(c) / – the champion(s) heading into the match
