= Wrestling World 1996 =

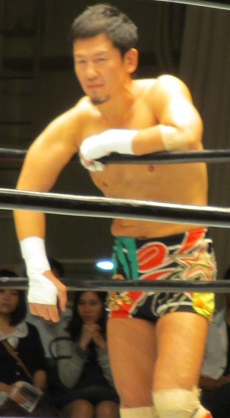
- Koji Kanemoto, who lost his IWGP Junior Heavyweight Championship to Jushin Thunder Liger at the event.
- Promotion(s): New Japan Pro-Wrestling; UWF International
- Date: January 4, 1996
- City: Tokyo, Japan
- Venue: Tokyo Dome
- Attendance: 54,000

January 4 Tokyo Dome Show chronology
← Previous; Battle 7	Next → Wrestling World

New Japan Pro-Wrestling events chronology
← Previous; Wrestling Dontaku 1995	Next → Battle Formation 1996

Wrestling World 1996 was a professional wrestling television special event co-produced by the New Japan Pro-Wrestling (NJPW) and UWF International (UWFi) promotions. The event took place on January 4 in the Tokyo Dome. Wrestling World 1996 was the fifth January 4 Tokyo Dome Show held by NJPW. The show drew 54,000 spectators and $5,400,000 in ticket sales.

The driving storyline behind the show was an "inter-promotional" rivalry between NJPW and UWFi, which saw wrestlers from the promotions face off in a series of three matches. Hiroshi Hase's retirement match against his former tag team partner Kensuke Sasaki was also part of the card. The main event of the show was IWGP Heavyweight Champion Keiji Mutoh losing the championship to UWFi representative Nobuhiko Takada. The undercard featured an additional title change as Jushin Thunder Liger defeated Koji Kanemoto to win the IWGP Junior Heavyweight Championship. In total the show consisted of 10 matches.

== Production ==
=== Background ===
The January 4 Tokyo Dome Show is NJPW's biggest annual event and has been called "the largest professional wrestling show in the world outside of the United States" and the "Japanese equivalent to the Super Bowl".

=== Storylines ===
Wrestling World 1996 featured professional wrestling matches that involved different wrestlers from pre-existing scripted feuds and storylines. Wrestlers portrayed villains, heroes, or less distinguishable characters in scripted events that built tension and culminated in a wrestling match or series of matches.

== Results ==
No.	Results	Stipulations	Times
1	Shinjiro Otani, Tokimitsu Ishizawa and Yuji Nagata defeated Hiromitsu Kanehara, Kazushi Sakuraba and Kenichi Yamamoto	Six-man tag team match: NJPW (1) vs. UWFi (0)	10:15
2	Hiroyoshi Tenzan defeated Satoshi Kojima	Singles match	09:24
3	Jushin Thunder Liger defeated Koji Kanemoto (c)	Singles match for the IWGP Junior Heavyweight Championship	18:59
4	Shiro Koshinaka defeated Masahiro Chono	Singles match	09:49
5	Hiromichi Fuyuki defeated Yoji Anjo	Singles match	06:42
6	Kensuke Sasaki defeated Hiroshi Hase	Singles match	16:36
7	Antonio Inoki defeated Big Van Vader via submission	Singles match	14:16
8	Riki Choshu defeated Masahito Kakihara	Singles match: NJPW (2) vs. UWFi (0)	05:46
9	Shinya Hashimoto defeated Kazuo Yamazaki	Singles match	09:18
10	Nobuhiko Takada defeated Keiji Mutoh (c)	Singles match for the IWGP Heavyweight Championship: NJPW (2) vs. UWFi (1)	17:51
(c) / – the champion(s) heading into the match
