= Mark Fleming (wrestler) =

American professional wrestler

Personal information
- Born: June 15, 1962 (age 64) Norfolk, Virginia, U.S.

Professional wrestling career
- Ring name: Mark Fleming
- Billed height: 6 ft 2 in (1.88 m)
- Billed weight: 255 lb (116 kg; 18.2 st)
- Trained by: Lou Thesz
- Debut: 1982
- Retired: 2006

Mark Fleming (born June 15, 1962) is an American retired professional wrestler, who worked for Jim Crockett Promotions in the Mid-Atlantic, and in Japan in the 1980s and 1990s. He is known for his shoot style of wrestling.

== Early life ==
Fleming was the district champion for Virginia in high school wrestling in 1980. He was trained by Lou Thesz. Fleming got a try out in the Mid-Atlantic led by Gene Anderson and Ole Anderson.

== Professional wrestling career ==
Fleming made his professional wrestling debut in 1982 for Jim Crockett Promotions. During his time with the company he worked as a jobber. He would also worked for Pro Wrestling America which had joint shows with Jim Crockett. In 1986, he worked for Central States Wrestling in Kansas City. During his time in JCP, Fleming lost to the likes of Bruiser Brody, Gene Anderson, Nikita Koloff, Ivan Koloff, Dusty Rhodes, Magnum T. A., Tully Blanchard, and Sting. Fleming said "His best opponent was Ivan Koloff." In 1988, Ted Turner bought Jim Crockett Promotions and renamed it World Championship Wrestling (WCW). Fleming left WCW at the end of 1988.

In 1989, Fleming made his debut in Japan where he was guided by Tokyo Joe. During that year he worked for New Japan Pro Wrestling.

In 1990, Fleming returned to the States working for South Atlantic Pro Wrestling. Fleming fought Ken Shamrock to a 20-minute time limit draw during the first round of the NAWA Heavyweight Championship. He also worked in independent promotions in the Carolinas and Virginia.

In 1992, Fleming returned to Japan this time working for UWF International, a shoot style promotion. He left UWF International in 1993.

From 1995 to 1999, Fleming worked in Japan's United Nations Wrestling where he feuded with Japanese wrestler Sad Genius.

Fleming's last match on October 14, 2006, when he defeated Kamala at TNT Pro Wrestling in Portsmouth, Virginia.

== Personal life ==
Fleming owned a gym called Fleming's Gym in Portsmouth, Virginia. He is also a head instructor for Lou Thesz's professional wrestling gym.

In 2016, Fleming released an autobiography with Scott Teal called It's Wrestling, Not Rasslin! about Fleming's life and career in wrestling published by Crowbar Press.

== Championships and accomplishments ==
  - International Heavyweight Champion 1990 to 1992
  - Virginia Heavyweight Champion (3 times)
