= The Three Musketeers (professional wrestling) =

Professional wrestling trio tag team

Toukon Sanjushi

Stable
- Members: Keiji Muto; Masahiro Chono; Shinya Hashimoto
- Name(s): Toukon Sanjushi ("The Three Musketeers")
- Billed heights: Mutoh:

Toukon Sanjushi (闘魂三銃士, Tōkon Sanjūshi) was a Japanese professional wrestling trio consisting of Keiji Muto, Masahiro Chono, and Shinya Hashimoto.

While the Japanese name of the trio literally translates to "Fighting Spirit Three Musketeers", in English they are commonly known simply as "The Three Musketeers".

== Careers ==
Keiji Muto, Masahiro Chono, and Shinya Hashimoto were part of the Class of 1984 of the New Japan Pro-Wrestling (NJPW) dojo, which included Akira Nogami and Jyushin Thunder Liger. Hashimoto would be the first to make his debut, in September 1984, while Muto and Chono faced each other in their debuts a month later.

In 1988, while on an excursion in Puerto Rico, the three formed Toukon Sanjushi or The Three Musketeers. They had one match in NJPW as a team together on July 29 against Kengo Kimura, Shiro Koshinaka, and Tatsumi Fujinami, before Muto returned to North America for more seasoning. Chono and Hashimoto would remain a tag team for a couple years, with their most notable match against Antonio Inoki and Seiji Sakaguchi in February 1990 at the Tokyo Dome.

In 1991, Toukon Sanjushi solidified their status as the next generation of NJPW at the first-ever G1 Climax tournament with Chono winning the tournament after defeating Muto in the finals. A year later, the trio would begin to have more success, as Chono won the NWA World Heavyweight Championship, and Muto, as The Great Muta, won the IWGP Heavyweight Championship. It temporarily left Hashimoto out in the cold, until he won the IWGP Heavyweight Championship from Muta in September 1993.

In August 1994, Toukon Sanjushi disbanded as a team, as Chono turned into a villain shortly after the G1 Climax.

In the early 2000s, NJPW began promoting the trio of Hiroshi Tanahashi, Katsuyori Shibata and Shinsuke Nakamura as the new Three Musketeers.

Between 2001 and 2005, the three would reunite on special occasions, mainly press conferences, occasionally with Mitsuharu Misawa.

Tragedy struck the group when Shinya Hashimoto died on July 11, 2005, from a brain aneurysm, at the young age of 40. Hashimoto's death dashed hopes for Hashimoto's return to NJPW and the upcoming Tokon Sanjushi reunion on July 26. Muto and Chono were deeply affected by the loss of Hashimoto.

In January 2007, after defeating Hiroyoshi Tenzan and Satoshi Kojima at the first edition of Wrestle Kingdom, Muto and Chono paid tribute to Hashimoto by wearing his trademark white headband and exiting the ring to Hashimoto's theme music.

In March 2011, Shinya's son Daichi debuted, and Muto and Chono served as his first opponents.

On June 29, 2023, NJPW announced that Ren Narita, Shota Umino and Yota Tsuji would henceforth be referred to as the Reiwa Three Musketeers.
