= Nobuhiko Takada =

Japanese professional wrestler (born 1962)

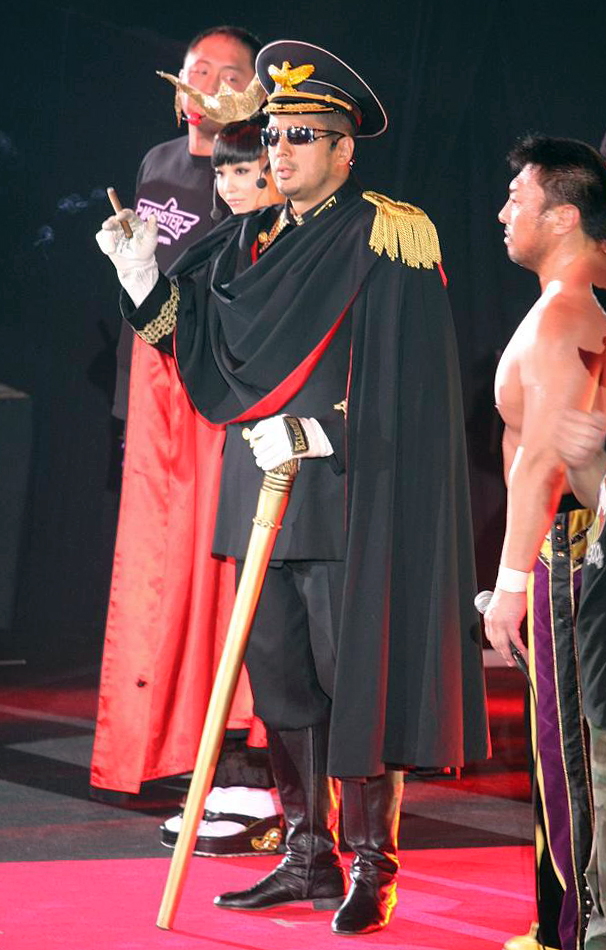
- Takada dressed as Generalissimo Takada in HUSTLE
- Born: April 12, 1962 (age 64); Izumi-ku, Yokohama, Japan
- Professional wrestling career
- Ring name(s): The Esperanza; Generalissimo Takada; Nobuhiko Takada
- Billed height: 1.83 m (6 ft 0 in)
- Trained by: Antonio Inoki; Karl Gotch; Kotetsu Yamamoto; Yoshiaki Fujiwara
- Debut: May 9, 1981
- Retired: July 26, 2009
- Martial arts career
- Nationality: Japanese
- Height: 1.83 m (6 ft 0 in)
- Weight: 95.25 kg (210 lb; 15 st 0 lb)
- Division: Heavyweight; Openweight
- Style: Shootfighting, Black belt in Brazilian jiu-jitsu
- Team: Takada Dojo
- Years active: 1997–2002

Mixed martial arts record
- Total: 10
- Wins: 2
- By submission: 2
- Losses: 6
- By knockout: 1
- By submission: 4
- By decision: 1
- Draws: 2

Other information
- Mixed martial arts record from Sherdog

Nobuhiko Takada (Japanese: 高田伸彦, ring name: 高田 延彦) (born April 12, 1962) is a Japanese former mixed martial artist, retired professional wrestler, actor, and writer. He competed in New Japan Pro-Wrestling (NJPW), Universal Wrestling Federation (UWF) and the Union of Wrestling Forces International (UWFI) in the 1980s and 1990s, becoming one of the highest figures of the "shoot-style" movement.

Takada later turned to mixed martial arts (MMA) where, despite his controversial match fixing ventures and lack of competitive success, he was credited with the existence and development of global MMA promotion Pride Fighting Championships, in which he worked as an executive after his retirement from active competition until its closure. He also founded and starred at the sports entertainment professional wrestling promotion Hustle from 2004 to 2009, and worked as an executive for the Rizin Fighting Federation from 2015 to 2023.

== Professional wrestling career ==
=== New Japan Pro-Wrestling (1981–1984) ===
After training in the New Japan Pro-Wrestling (NJPW) dojo under Yoshiaki Fujiwara, Takada made his professional wrestling debut in 1981 against Norio Honaga. As is customary for professional wrestling newcomers, Takada spent his first year as a jobber, though he scored occasional victories against other rookies. Among them, he feuded with Kazuo Yamazaki, and their matches were so well received that TV Asahi included one of them as part of the NJPW show, something unheard at the time. Takada was appointed Antonio Inoki's personal assistant. He was also Hulk Hogan's assistant for his Japanese tours, and during that time, he was nicknamed Seishun no Esperanza (transl. "Youth Esperanza") due to his gutsy and hopeful rookie antics.

In August 1983, Takada accompanied Inoki to Canada for a special appearance in Stampede Wrestling. He replaced the retiring Satoru Sayama in the event, and had his first worldwide match, defeating Athol Foley. The victory granted a rank increase for Takada, and he was made part of the 1984 WWF Junior Heavyweight Championship league, facing wrestlers like Bret Hart, Dynamite Kid, and Davey Boy Smith. He stayed with NJPW until April 1984, before switching over to the Universal Wrestling Federation (UWF) by Fujiwara's invitation, and in June he was officially part of the new promotion.

=== Universal Wrestling Federation (1985–1986) ===
Takada's first matches in UWF were as a NJPW representative, but he soon joined full-time. He started with a successful singles run; he defeated foreign wrestlers and had fought Fujiwara and Akira Maeda. On 20 January 1985, he won against Super Tiger by referee stoppage. The tenure was short, as UWF folded shortly after, and Takada and other wrestlers returned to NJPW.

=== Return to NJPW (1986–1988) ===
Upon their return, the former UWF wrestlers created a storyline of invading the promotion, with Takada and Maeda as the twin leaders. As a singles wrestler, Takada was involved in a heated feud with the IWGP junior heavyweight champion, Shiro Koshinaka, who had been Giant Baba's assistant like Takada was Inoki's. Takada defeated Koshinaka in their first match on May 19 to win the title after hitting a Tombstone Piledriver, and he retained it in two more matches against him, as well as challengers like Keiichi Yamada, Black Tiger, and Kazuo Yamazaki, before losing the title back to Koshinaka on September 19. At the peak of his popularity, Takada received the new nickname of Wagamamana Hikazoku (Egotistical Kneecap) for his hard, stiff kicking ability.

In March 1987, Takada amplified the feud with Koshinaka to a tag team when he and Maeda defeated Koshinaka and Keiji Mutoh to capture the vacant IWGP Tag Team Championship. They retained it for months until they lost it to Fujiwara and Yamazaki. Takada spent the rest of the year in tag team fights, except for a tenure in the Top of The Super Junior I and two challenges for the IWGP Junior Heavyweight title before Kuniaki Kobayashi and Hiroshi Hase. In March 1988, Takada left NJPW with Maeda and most of the original UWF wrestlers to form the second incarnation of the UWF called UWF Newborn.

=== UWF Newborn (1988–1990) ===
Takada debuted in UWF Newborn in an exhibition match with rookie Shigeo Miyato, but he soon climbed the rankings to become the promotion's top wrestler second only to Maeda, who he defeated by TKO in their second match. The promotion's run was highly successful, and they broke records on the professional wrestling/shoot-fighting event U-COSMOS, where he defeated Greco-Roman wrestling champion Duane Koslowski, twin brother of Olympic medalist Dennis Koslowski. After the event, Takada was almost unbeaten in singles matches until the promotion's closure in December 1990.

=== Union of Wrestling Forces International (1991–1996) ===
After UWF Newborn shut down, Takada formed the Union of Wrestling Forces International (UWFI), using former UWF wrestlers, while Maeda formed Fighting Network Rings, and Fujiwara formed Pro Wrestling Fujiwara Gumi. Takada opened his run as the top star of the company beating Tatsuo Nakano, Yamazaki, and American wrestler Bob Backlund, whom he fought in a pair of publicized matches. The first of them was controversial, as Takada ended the bout in 1:15 when Backlund fell to a body kick, and it almost caused a riot in the stadium; it is believed that it was an accidental KO instead of a pre-planned match. They held a rematch after two months, with Takada winning by submission after 15 minutes.

==== Fight with Trevor Berbick ====
Immediately after his affair with Backlund, Takada was put in a bout against former heavyweight champion boxer Trevor Berbick, the last man to fight Muhammad Ali. Sources disagree about whether it was meant to be a worked match or a real fight, or even whether Berbick himself knew it before the bout.

Takada landed a low kick to the left leg seconds into the match, to which Berbick immediately protested to the referee while signaling that kicking below the waist was not allowed. Berbick seemed to be under the impression that leg kicks were illegal in the match, even although he was wearing leg protectors in the first place. As the action was not stopped, Takada continued landing low kicks one after another, dominating an increasingly irate and panicked Berbick, who was doing nothing to defend against them other than complaining loudly with every kick. Eventually, Takada scored a roundhouse kick to the head when Berbick downed his hands to protect his legs, which he followed with more leg kicks. At that point, Berbick exited the ring and refused to return, granting Takada the victory by forfeit. The match had lasted less than one round end ended with the boxing champion failing to throw any punch.

After the bout, Berbick claimed he had been double crossed, accusing UWF-i of changing the rules to allow kicking to the legs in order to benefit their wrestler. For their part, UWF-i officials claimed they had tried repeatedly to explain the rules to Berbick, who would have refused to listen to the details. According to UWFI trainer Pat McCarthy, "no rules were ever changed. [Berbick] just never wanted to listen." Regardless of the truth, the image of the heavyweight champion walking out of the fight increased greatly Takada's popularity.

==== Pro-Wrestling World Heavyweight Champion ====
Takada also had feuds with Gary Albright and Super Vader. In 1992, Takada was awarded an old NWA World Heavyweight title belt by Lou Thesz after defeating Albright, and was proclaimed the "Pro-Wrestling World Heavyweight Champion". He defended the title until Thesz withdrew the belt in 1995, losing the title once to Super Vader. On December 5, 1993, he defeated Super Vader before 46,168 fans at Tokyo's Meiji-Jingu Stadium.

As champion, Takada fought against Kōji Kitao, who came back after a long hiatus, at the October 23, 1992, UWFI event. However, it was known that Kitao was no stranger to controversy and so discussions over the outcome of the match were difficult, which led to a draw. During the match, Takada shot on Kitao, throwing a roundhouse kick which legitimately knocked him out. Like the Berbick situation, it improved Takada's reputation with the audience, but also changed Kitao's professionalism to a better avail, as the two shook hands afterwards.

In 1995, Takada returned to NJPW as the key figure in the landmark New Japan vs. UWFI program. On October 9, 1995, Takada's match against Mutoh drew 67,000 fans to the Tokyo Dome, drawing the largest crowd and gate in Japanese wrestling history at the time. Three months later at Wrestling World, Takada defeated Mutoh in a rematch to capture the IWGP Heavyweight Championship, becoming the only wrestler to have held all three major New Japan titles at the time, and the only one for over 20 years to hold both IWGP Heavyweight and Junior Heavyweight titles in his career (succeeded by Kenny Omega in 2018). Takada dropped the title to Shinya Hashimoto at Battle Formation on April 29, 1996, drawing a crowd of 65,000 and a gate of $5.7 million.

On August 17, 1996, Takada defeated Yoji Anjo at Tokyo's Meiji-Jingu Stadium. UWFI would fold in December 1996.

=== Various Promotions (1996–1997, 2000) ===
In July 1996, while still working for UWFI, Takada participated in a six-man tag team title tournament with Masahito Kakihara and Yuhi Sano where they won the vacated WAR World 6-Man Tag Team Championship defeating Gedo, Jado and Kodo Fuyuki. They dropped the titles to Bam Bam Bigelow, Kodo Fuyki, and Yoji Anjo. On October 8, 1996, he defeated Abdullah the Butcher at Tokyo Pro Wrestling.

In December 1996, the UWFI folded after the UWFI–WAR feud, and founded Kingdom Pro Wrestling in its place. Takada only participated in one of its events: an exhibition against Ryuki Ueyama on May 4, 1997, in a draw. He later left professional wrestling for mixed martial arts (MMA).

He returned for one night on New Year's Eve 2000 teaming with Keiji Muto defeating MMA fighters Don Frye and Ken Shamrock at Inoki Bom-Ba-Ye in Osaka, Japan.

=== Hustle (2004–2009) ===
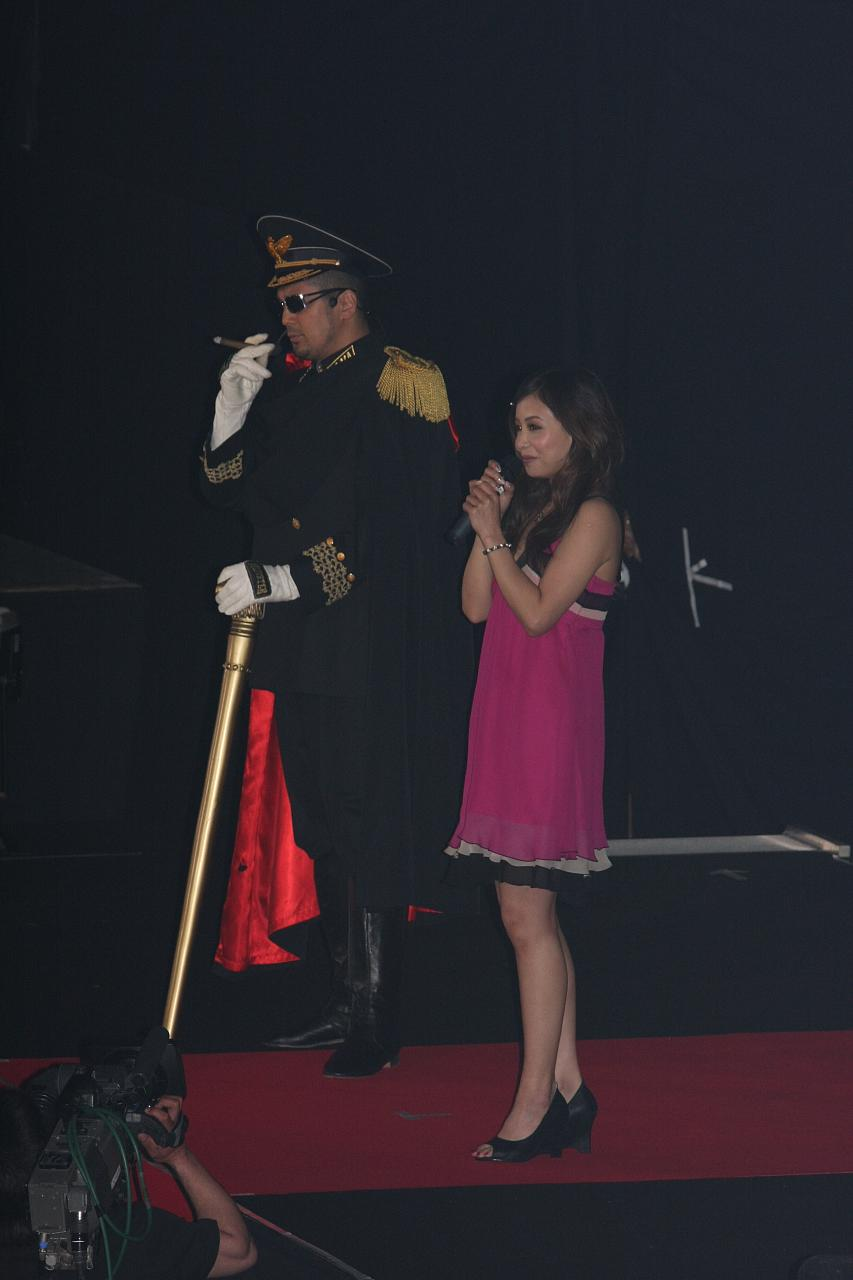
Generalissimo Takada along with Yinling

In 2004, Takada was made the president of the Hustle promotion in Japan, created by a coproduction between Dream Stage Entertainment and Pro Wrestling ZERO-ONE. He firstly appeared in a press conference previous to the first Hustle event along with fellow DSE directive Nobuyuki Sakakibara, who badmouthed professional wrestling to praise MMA, which angered Naoya Ogawa, who flipped the table and confronted them. To solve things, the event featured a battle between Ogawa's professional wrestling loyalists and Takada's MMA allies, who were called the Takada Monster Army. The night ended with Ogawa being pinned by Monster Army member Bill Goldberg, giving the first victory to Takada. The next event, Takada expanded his army and debuted the gimmick of Generalissimo Takada, a larger-than-life military dictator endowed with supernatural powers, reminiscent of fictional villains Yasunori Katō and Lord Dessler. Generalissimo Takada presented himself not as Nobuhiko Takada, but an old friend of his, and proceeded to send his enforcers to beat up Naoya before his match against Matt Ghaffari. This marked the new view of Hustle, in which Takada and his evil forces battled Ogawa and his heroic Hustle Army.

Takada returned to the ring in 2006 as The Esperanza, a supernatural wrestling cyborg created by Generalissimo Takada. The Esperanza defeated Yoshihiro Tajiri and pinned him with Takada's trademark kick to the head. At HustleMania 2006, he defeated Masaki Sumitani in what was billed as Sumitani's retirement match, pinning him and giving him his own finisher, the 69 Driver, which caused "erectile dysfunction" in Sumitani. The Esperanza was described as invincible until Hustlemania 2007, when he was defeated by Wataru Sakata thanks to the magical aid of Sakata's wife Eiko Koike. The Esperanza's last match was at Hustle Aid 2009, when he was finally beaten by Magnum Tokyo. The same night, Generalissimo Takada announced his retirement, revealing that his true goal was to leave an eternal mark in professional wrestling, which he had accomplished thanks to Hustle. He appointed Magnum Tokyo as the new director and shook hands with the Hustle Army members. A character named King RIKI (Riki Takeuchi) interrupted and challenged him, which led to a supernatural duel in which RIKI reflected Takada's attacks and mortally wounded the Generalissimo. The dying Takada disappeared, declaring that Hustle would live forever. After that, the Monster Army was disbanded.

== Mixed martial arts career ==
Takada entered MMA when he joined Pride Fighting Championships, an event created to host a fight between him and Brazilian jiu-jitsu master Rickson Gracie. The bout was highly anticipated since Gracie had defeated the UWFI wrestler Yoji Anjo in 1994, as Takada was still expected to face Rickson in order to restore his late promotion's reputation. However, although he had been believed to be a strong legitimate contender for most of his career, Takada was not a qualified fighter. He had trained in submission wrestling and other disciplines in his various promotions, but after a 17-year professional wrestling career, he was already too far from his physical prime to transition into MMA.

According to his former training partners, future King of Pancrase champions Masakatsu Funaki and Minoru Suzuki, Takada had actually been an outstanding fighter in their youth, being able to repeatedly dominate them in sparring, but after stopping sparring during his stardom, and with the arrival of injuries and ring wear, his skills waned over time. By the time of his Pride fights, as attested by Bas Rutten, Takada was overcome by Brazilian jiu-jitsu white belt practitioners while training in the Beverly Hills Jiu-Jitsu Club. His placement in the main event scene also forced him to fight only high-level opponents, which included several of the greatest fighters of the period, like Igor Vovchanchyn, Mark Kerr, and Mirko Cro Cop.

Despite these considerations, Takada was able to hold a limited amount of in-ring competence. As described by Jack Slack from Fightland: "It would be easy to remember Nobuhiko Takada as some kind of bum. [...] But this might be doing a disservice to what Takada was able to accomplish in the ring despite inexperience, age and a lack of athletic prowess. For one thing, in legitimate fights Takada was able to scramble up from beneath Mark Kerr, take down Igor Vovchanchyn, and indeed take the latter's notoriously powerful punches." Since 2024, twelve years after the end of his mixed martial arts career, Takada holds a brown belt in Brazilian jiu-jitsu granted by Rickson Gracie himself.

Pundits acknowledged his effort to continue an unsuccessful fighting career in order to support the MMA promotion he had helped to found, lending Pride his own popularity as a professional wrestler until it had established its place, even through fixed fights whenever it was needed. In his book The MMA Encyclopedia, Jonathan Snowden wrote about Takada: "He lost all [the fights], but it never seemed to faze him. He'd be back again and again, realizing that even though the fights were hopeless, the promotion needed his presence on the card to sell tickets."

=== Pride (1997–2007) ===
==== Challenge against Gracie ====
Takada's debut against Gracie happened on October 11, 1997, at Pride 1. After circling around Gracie for some time, Takada stopped the first takedown attempt by grabbing the ring ropes, but after the restart, Gracie scored a double leg takedown and moved to mount position over him. Although Takada tried to hold him down from the bottom, Gracie captured his arm and executed an armbar for the win at the 2:32 mark. While the matchup was a huge economic success, which ensured new Pride events in the future, Takada's poor performance resulted in a comparable disappointment for Japanese audiences, drawing very negative comments and marked the beginning of the end of Takada as a main eventer. He was likened to a war criminal to Japan by specialized press. His own former trainer Karl Gotch commented unfavorably at the bout, stating: "that is not the Takada I know."

Takada faced kickboxer Kyle Sturgeon at Pride 3, a match that was acknowledged as a fight fixed in order to attempt to rebuild Takada's status for a rematch. As planned, Takada overcame Sturgeon by heel hook and requested another fight against Gracie. The latter agreed, claiming "I feel Takada is a warrior and deserves the chance to try and redeem himself" in a subsequent interview, and the rematch was held at Pride 4.

Gracie opened the fight shooting for a takedown, but Takada blocked it and held Gracie away from the ground with a tight clinch. After exchanging short knee strikes and stomps with Gracie, Takada dropped him with a hard knee to the midsection and blocked his subsequent guard pulling attempt. Gracie eventually managed to pull Takada down, but Takada stood up in order to initiate a leglock. Takada worked from the bottom, dismounting Gracie several times and transitioned into a heel hook attempt, but Gracie avoided it and applied an armbar for the win. Although the fight did not restore Takada's reputation, it was unanimously considered a much better performance, with some calling it Takada's best showing.

==== Matches against wrestlers ====
Takada fought his next match at Pride 5 against Ultimate Fighting Championship tournament winner Mark Coleman. This was the second instance of a worked fight in Takada's career given in an attempt to increase his fleeting popularity. Despite outweighing Takada by 40 pounds, Coleman was chosen as his opponent because his previous losses to low-ranked fighters would make the result more credible. He described the treat as "It was what it was. I needed to support my family. They guaranteed me another fight after that and I needed that security. It was what it was. I'm going to leave it at that." However, it is unknown whether Takada himself was aware of the fixing.

The match was noted to fail at working seamlessly. Takada opened it earning a yellow card when he grabbed the ropes to avoid being taken down, while Coleman had to abstain visibly from landing strikes on the ground when he scored another takedown. After some scrambling, Coleman achieved dominant position and pursued a neck crank and a keylock, but the first round ended right after. At the second, Coleman took Takada down again, but he gave up his position into Takada's guard and the Japanese locked a heel hook, making him tap out theatrically.

Takada was then pitted against Mark Kerr, Mark Coleman's teammate, at Pride 6. Unlike the previous, this match is generally acknowledged as a non-fixed fight, although Kerr reported he was offered a bonus payment in exchange for fighting a technical bout instead of using ground and pound. As such, Kerr went to claim he would defeat Takada by a submission move in less time than Rickson Gracie had done in Takada's debut. The fight was also promoted as Kerr taking revenge for Coleman.

Started the match, Takada came out with punches, driving Kerr to clinch. The American executed a single leg takedown, but Takada escaped and returned to standing, where he started scoring quick low kicks. Kerr took him down again, though, and achieved side control. From there, he locked an Americana, forcing Takada to tap out. The fight ended at 3:05, two minutes less than the first fight between Takada and Gracie, as Kerr had promised.

At PRIDE 7, Takada faced fellow professional wrestler Alexander Otsuka. The match, another worked venture, is controversial about whether it was billed as a mixed martial arts fight or a professional wrestling match. It is not included in Takada's fight record on the Sherdog website, though is in his PRIDE official record. The match saw Otsuka landing a fisherman suplex before Takada locked a rear naked choke for the tap out.

==== PRIDE Grand Prix and competition against strikers ====
Takada competed in the PRIDE Grand Prix 2000 Opening Round, where he was pitted against his second opponent in the Gracie family, Rickson's brother Royce, who returned from a hiatus after his career in Ultimate Fighting Championship (UFC). At the beginning of the match, Royce immediately clinched Takada and pulled guard, but action stopped right there, as none of the fighters followed with any action. For the rest of the 15 minute match, Takada lied on Royce's guard, while Royce held him there occasionally hitting heel kicks to the Japanese's kidneys and trying gi chokes. After the end of the bout, decision was given to Royce. Takada visibly limped to his corner, which was later explained as Takada having fought the bout with a heel injury.

The fight was negatively received by the crowd, who booed Takada. It drew comparisons to Ken Shamrock's "The Dance in Detroit" bout against Dan Severn in April 1995 and particularly to Shamrock's own bout against Royce Gracie at the same year.

Takada's next MMA event participation was in Pride 11, where he fought against Vovchanchyn. Having trained especially for the match with his own trainee Kazushi Sakuraba and K-1 veteran Masaaki Satake, Takada was acknowledged to have improved his performance. However, Vovchanchyn overpowered Takada in the second round, when he caught him with a counterpunch and gained full mount after a restart. Vovchanchyn landed hard strikes, making Takada tap out.

At Pride 17, Takada faced Cro Cop, who was debuting in mixed martial arts; as such, the fight had six shorter rounds and no judges. During the match, Takada broke his foot, forcing him to depend solely on defensive tactics. He spent the rest of the match sitting on the mat, fruitlessly goading Cro Cop to engage him on the ground until the end of the bout. Reception to this strategy was negative.

His next fight was again against a kickboxer, Mike Bernardo, as part of Inoki's team in the Inoki Bom-Ba-Ye event. The fight saw virtually no offense, as both fighters acted with excessive caution to the other's skills and never engaged in the entire fight.

==== Retirement fight ====
Takada's final match was against his former student Kiyoshi Tamura. There was both story and controversy between them, as Tamura had challenged Takada several times without an answer, and then walked out of UWF International in 1995 to work for Fighting Network Rings. Tamura was also reluctant to fight at the event, as he shared cards with Kenichi Yamamoto, another Takada understudy he had a personal enmity with.

Tamura dropped Takada with a leg kick, but the match was paused when he landed an accidental heavy low blow. After recovering, Takada took Tamura down and worked a few strikes through his guard, but he escaped to his feet. In the second round, Tamura connected with a combination and knocked Takada out.

The bout was followed by a reconciliation between Takada and Tamura, the latter of whom cried and stated: "Thank you for giving the people their dream and hope for twenty-two years." Takada's proper retirement ceremony was hosted after the main event between his other student Kazushi Sakuraba and Gilles Arsene. Former UWF wrestlers like Sakuraba, Tamura, Yamamoto, Yoshihiro Takayama, and Anjo attended the ceremony, along with Pride fighters like Fedor Emelianenko, Antonio Rodrigo Nogueira, Wanderlei Silva and Gary Goodridge. Inoki also came to the ceremony.

After retiring, Takada ran his mixed martial arts training facility, Takada Dojo, where he helped train fighters. He also stayed on in a management role at Pride and its parent company Dream Stage Entertainment until it was purchased by Zuffa in 2007.

=== Rizin Fighting Federation (2015–2023) ===
In 2015, Takada returned to mainstream MMA when he signed on as a spokesperson and matchmaker for the Rizin Fighting Federation, alongside Nobuyuki Sakakibara and other former Pride employees. He left the promotion at the end of 2023, with Sakakibara explaining it as Takada not feeling able to play a worthy role in Rizin after turning 60. Takada later revealed he had a stress-related heart condition, undergoing surgery in July 2024.

=== Jiu-Jitsu (2026) ===
Nobuhiko Takada stood at the center of the mat at Yoyogi National Gymnasium on Friday, September 4, and did something few would have predicted for a man in his sixties who spent decades absorbing the physical toll of professional wrestling and mixed martial arts. He won a world title, competing in the Masters 61+ brown belt.

It marked his third consecutive year on the SJJIF World Championship stage, a run that began in 2024 when the tournament was held in Japan, and across all three appearances he has now claimed titles in both the purple and brown belt divisions.https://bjjdoc.com/2026/09/05/rickson-gracies-legendary-opponent-nobuhiko-takada-competes-and-wins-brown-belt-world-championship/

Rickson Gracie has promoted Nobuhiko Takada to Brazilian jiu-jitsu black belt, according to BJJDOC, placing a formal jiu-jitsu rank on one of the most recognizable opponents from Gracie's Japan fighting years.https://letsbjj.com/en/news/news-20260913-rickson-gracie-promotes-old-rival-nobuhiko-takada-with/

== Bibliography ==
- (1993) In the name of the Strongest (最強の名のもとに, Saikyō no na no moto ni) ISBN 4195551900
- (2005) 10.11 ISBN 4062130602
- (2012) Words to be ready: Those who are worried, come on! (覚悟の言葉 〜悩める奴らよでてこいや!〜, Kakugo no kotoba 〜 nayameru yatsura yo dete koi ya!〜) ISBN 9784062130608

== Championships and accomplishments ==
- New Japan Pro-Wrestling
  - IWGP Heavyweight Championship (1 time)
  - IWGP Junior Heavyweight Championship (1 time)
  - IWGP Tag Team Championship (1 time) – with Akira Maeda
- Nikkan Sports
  - Match of The Year (1996) vs. Shinya Hashimoto on April 29
- Pro Wrestling Illustrated
  - Ranked No. 27 of the 500 best singles wrestlers in the PWI 500 in 1995
  - Ranked No. 43 of the 500 best singles wrestlers during the PWI Years in 2003
  - Ranked No. 13 of the 100 best tag teams during the PWI Years with Akira Maeda in 2003
- Tokyo Sports
  - Best Tag Team of the Year (1986) – with Shiro Koshinaka
  - Effort Award (1983)
  - Match of the Year (1996) – vs. Genichiro Tenryu on September 11
  - Wrestler of the Year (1992)
- Union of Wrestling Forces International
  - Pro-Wrestling World Heavyweight Championship (2 times)
- Wrestle Association R
  - WAR World Six-Man Tag Team Championship (1 time) – with Naoki Sano and Masahito Kakihara
  - WAR World Six-Man Tag Team Championship Tournament (1996) – with Naoki Sano and Masahito Kakihara
- Wrestling Observer Newsletter
  - Best Technical Wrestler (1987)
  - Wrestling Observer Newsletter Hall of Fame (Class of 1996)

== Mixed martial arts record ==
Professional record breakdown
| 10 matches | 2 wins | 6 losses |
| By knockout | 0 | 1 |
| By submission | 2 | 4 |
| By decision | 0 | 1 |
| Draws | 2 | |

| Res. | Record | Opponent | Method | Event | Date | Round | Time | Location | Notes |
|---|---|---|---|---|---|---|---|---|---|
| Loss | 2–6–2 | Kiyoshi Tamura | KO (punch) | PRIDE 23 | November 24, 2002 | 2 | 1:00 | Tokyo, Japan | |
| Draw | 2–5–2 | Mike Bernardo | Draw | Inoki Bom-Ba-Ye 2001 | December 31, 2001 | 3 | 3:00 | Saitama, Japan | |
| Draw | 2–5–1 | Mirko Cro Cop | Draw | PRIDE 17 | November 3, 2001 | 4 | 5:00 | Tokyo, Japan | |
| Loss | 2–5 | Igor Vovchanchyn | Submission (punches) | PRIDE 11 | October 31, 2000 | 2 | 3:17 | Osaka, Japan | |
| Loss | 2–4 | Royce Gracie | Decision (unanimous) | PRIDE Grand Prix 2000 Opening Round | January 30, 2000 | 1 | 15:00 | Tokyo, Japan | |
| Loss | 2–3 | Mark Kerr | Submission (kimura) | PRIDE 6 | July 4, 1999 | 1 | 3:04 | Yokohama, Kanagawa, Japan | |
| Win | 2–2 | Mark Coleman | Submission (heel hook) | PRIDE 5 | April 29, 1999 | 2 | 1:44 | Nagoya, Japan | |
| Loss | 1–2 | Rickson Gracie | Submission (armbar) | PRIDE 4 | October 11, 1998 | 1 | 9:30 | Tokyo, Japan | |
| Win | 1–1 | Kyle Sturgeon | Submission (heel hook) | PRIDE 3 | June 24, 1998 | 1 | 2:18 | Tokyo, Japan | |
| Loss | 0–1 | Rickson Gracie | Submission (armbar) | PRIDE 1 | October 11, 1997 | 1 | 4:47 | Tokyo, Japan | |

== Exhibition boxing record ==
| 1 fight | 1 win | 0 losses |
|---|---|---|
| By disqualification | 1 | 0 |

| No. | Result | Record | Opponent | Type | Round, time | Date | Location | Notes |
|---|---|---|---|---|---|---|---|---|
| 1 | Win | 1–0 | Trevor Berbick | DQ | 1 (10), 3:00 | 21 Dec 1991 | Sumo Hall, Tokyo, Japan | Under special boxing-wrestling rules |

== Filmography ==
Film

| Year | Title | Role | Notes |
|---|---|---|---|
| 1989 | Yawara! A Fashionable Judo Girl! | Himself | Cameo |
| 2006 | Simpsons | Noriyuki Motoyima | |
| 2007 | Calling You | Mr. Yamaguchi | |
| 2007 - 2019 | Mokoubuchi movies 1-16 | An-san | |
| 2010 | Watashi no Yasashiku nai Senpai | Makoto Iriomote | |
| 2010 | Bokutachi no Play Ball | Himself | |
| 2014 | The Great Shu Ra Ra Boom | Nami Natsume | |
| 2015 | Super Hero Taisen GP: Kamen Rider 3 | General Black | |
| 2015 | Mr. Maxman | Ryo Jindaiji | |
| 2019 | Mentai Piriri | Kazuhisa Inao | |
| 2023 | We're Broke, My Lord! | | |

Television

| Year | Title | Role | Notes |
|---|---|---|---|
| 2006 | Kōmyō ga Tsuji | Honda Tadakatsu | Taiga drama |
| 2007 | Fūrin Kazan | Kojima Gorozaemon | Taiga drama |
| 2007 | Hitomi | Masaru Morimoto | |
| 2007 | Seven Days of a Daddy and a Daughter | Shin'ichi Sakuragi | |
| 2009 | Otomen | Ryo's father | |
| 2012 | Mou Yuukai Nante Shinai | Quick service delivery man | |
| 2018 | Solitary Gourmet | | |

Dubbing

| Year | Title | Role | Notes |
|---|---|---|---|
| 2014 | Sabotage | James "Monster" Murray | |

== Video games ==
- Saikyō: Takada Nobuhiko – Super Famicom 1995
