= UWF International =

Japanese professional wrestling promotion 1991–1996

Union of Wrestling Forces International
- Acronym: UWFi
- Founded: May 10, 1991
- Defunct: December 27, 1996
- Style: Shoot style
- Headquarters: Japan
- Founder(s): Nobuhiko Takada, Kazuo Yamazaki, Yukoh Miyato, Yoji Anjo and others
- Predecessor: Newborn UWF
- Successor: Kingdom

Union of Wrestling Forces International, better known as UWF International, U-Inter, or simply UWFi, was a shoot style professional wrestling promotion in Japan from 1991 to 1996. Founded in 1991 by Nobuhiko Takada and other former UWF wrestlers, UWF International was built around Takada as its ace and top star. The UWFi was the successor to the Newborn UWF that ran from 1988 to 1990, which itself was the successor to the original Universal Wrestling Federation.

Although the matches were predetermined, the UWF-i was very convincing for its time, promoting a combat-based style featuring a mix of wrestling, submission grappling and kickboxing. While the presentation was designed to resemble a legitimate combat sport, matches followed a distinct set of rules, with victory coming by knockout, submission, referee stoppage, or a points decision. Central to the promotion's image was the theme of it being "Real Pro-Wrestling". The promotion also held legitimate Kickboxing contests through its "Standing Bouts" division, and, in rare instances, special shoot fight matches.

In retrospect, UWFi, along with other shoot-style promotions, served as a precursor to mixed martial arts and to popular Japanese MMA promotions, particularly Pride FC. The promotion was also known for hiring dangerous shooters Lou Thesz, Billy Robinson and Danny Hodge as trainers and promoters of their product in order to establish legitimate credibility. At its peak, UWFi was one of Japan's most successful wrestling promotions, drawing large crowds at major venues such as the Tokyo Dome and Ryōgoku Kokugikan, including 67,000 spectators for the "UWFi vs. NJPW" 1995 event and 64,000 for Wrestling World 1996—making them the second- and fourth-largest-attended events in Japanese professional wrestling history—and having large ratings on Japanese television, while establishing Takada as one of the country's leading wrestling stars.

Financial difficulties and declining attendance led UWFi to enter an interpromotional feud with New Japan Pro-Wrestling (NJPW) in 1995, generating revenue but undermining its credibility when its supposedly superior "real" fighters were repeatedly defeated by NJPW wrestlers. UWFi closed in December 1996, with most of its roster moving to successor promotion Kingdom and later to mixed martial arts, particularly Pride Fighting Championships.

== History ==
The promotion was founded on May 10, 1991, as a continuation of the UWF. The UWFi featured most of UWF's roster, and was led by Nobuhiko Takada, who was the top star and the face of the promotion. Other natives for the promotion included Kazuo Yamazaki, Yoji Anjo, Kiyoshi Tamura, Tatsuo Nakano, Yuko Miyato, Masahito Kakihara and kickboxer Makoto Oe. Vintage shooter Billy Robinson was used as head trainer for their gym (the UWFi Snakepit), and wrestling legends Lou Thesz and Danny Hodge occasionally served as trainers in their pursuit of old-school credibility. Former pro wrestler Shinji Sasazaki would lend a hand by helping some of the foreign talent, mostly from the Tennessee area, get booked on their cards.

In 1992, the UWFi introduced its first championship, the "Real Pro-Wrestling World Heavyweight Championship", which was won by Takada after a victory over top foreign antagonist Gary Albright. Lou Thesz acted as commissioner and lent his 1950s NWA World title belt to be used as the distinction for it. The theme of UWFi being "real pro-wrestling" was central to the promotion's image, and both Thesz and Takada would deride other Japanese promotions (particularly Takada's old promotion New Japan Pro-Wrestling) for being "fake", while claiming themselves to be legit. UWFi, however, was no more legit than any other group at the time. Takada went so far as to challenge the champions of other major Japanese promotions (Mitsuharu Misawa (AJPW Triple Crown Champion at the time), Masahiro Chono (NWA World Heavyweight Champion at the time), and The Great Muta (IWGP Heavyweight Champion at the time), in an effort to determine who was the true world champion.

The UWFi's emphasis on proving the superiority of its "Real Pro-Wrestling" style was inspired in part by Antonio Inoki's famous inter-style bouts, particularly his 1976 match against Muhammad Ali. The promotion incorporated fighters and contests representing a range of disciplines, including kickboxing, Muay Thai, karate, Kempo karate and Savate in matches against their wrestlers. Notable examples included Nobuhiko Takada vs. WBC Heavyweight boxing champion Trevor Berbic, Kiyoshi Tamura vs. former WBC light-heavyweight boxing champion Matthew Saad Muhammad, and Nobuhiko Takada vs. former sumo grand champion and karate stylist Koji Kitao.

The UWFi also featured a separate division of "Standing Bouts", originally billed as the "UWF International Stand-up Fighting Division". These were genuine kickboxing contests held alongside the promotion's shoot-style wrestling, with rules varying between Oriental-style kickboxing, Full-Contact kickboxing and Muay Thai without elbows. The division's regular fighters were Makoto Ohe, a former All Japan Shootboxing champion, Bovy Chowaikung and Gong Yuttachai, who faced opponents from around the world with backgrounds in kickboxing, Muay Thai, karate, Kempo karate and Savate. Ohe's June 1991 bout with American kickboxer Rudy Lovato was particularly notable, while Ohe and Chowaikung later won ISKA world titles during their UWFi tenure. The UWFi also hosted the first ISKA-sanctioned bout in Japan and became the only professional wrestling promotion to have held world kickboxing titles.

In 1993, Super Vader, the World Heavyweight Champion from the United States-based World Championship Wrestling, accepted Thesz and Takada's grandstand challenge, whereas the aforementioned champions were "too afraid" of Takada to face him. After Gary Albright quit UWFi to join All Japan and Vader left over money disputes, the promotion was left with a lack of credible challengers to Takada's title, and interest in the promotion began to wane. After being overlooked several times over the years, Kazuo Yamazaki left to return to New Japan in July 1995.

In July 1994, Brazilian jiu-jitsu practitioner Rickson Gracie won the inaugural Vale Tudo Japan tournament, defeating four opponents in legitimate bouts. Gracie's victory drew UWFi's attention, as the promotion was seeking legitimate inter-style contests to demonstrate the superiority of its "Real Pro-Wrestling" style. UWFi approached Gracie about a fight with Nobuhiko Takada, but Gracie refused, as he reportedly expressed little interest in working with professional wrestlers or participating in matches that he regarded as staged rather than legitimate. The dispute was further inflamed by Takada, who publicly provoked and challenged Gracie, contributing to a personal feud between the two fighters. In December 1994, Yoji Anjo, accompanied by UWFi executive Shinji Sasazaki and members of the Japanese press, traveled to Gracie's academy in Los Angeles and performed a dojo storm, challenged him to a fight. Gracie accepted the challenge and defeated Anjo in the unsanctioned bout, dominating him with a violent ground-and-pound and choking him out with a rear-naked choke. The confrontation was subsequently publicized in Japan and became a serious embarrassment for UWFi, intensifying Gracie's rivalry with the promotion and fueling interest in a Gracie–Takada fight, which ultimately took place not at the UWFi, but at the inaugural Pride Fighting Championships event in 1997.

=== Interpromotional feuds and downfall ===
In 1995, Anjo and other UWFi bookers proposed co-promoting with New Japan Pro-Wrestling, as a potential solution to their financial problems. New Japan booker Riki Choshu agreed, under the condition that New Japan have full control over the booking of the interpromotional matches. Thesz, who saw New Japan as another gimmicky promotion, withdrew his support as a result and took the belt with him. For Choshu, it was an opportunity to get payback for Thesz and Takada's earlier derision of their wrestling style, and he was determined to show fans that the real stars were in New Japan. All of UWFi's stars mainly lost the interpromotional matches, with the exception of Takada, who won the IWGP Heavyweight Championship on January 4, 1996 at Wrestling World 1996. The NJPW vs. UWFi event on October 9, 1995 was a huge commercial success, drawing 67,000 spectators to the Tokyo Dome, making it the second-highest-attended professional wrestling event ever held in Japan, while its followup Wrestling World 1996 drew another 65,000, making it the fourth-largest event. However, the defeats severely undermined UWFi's credibility and its claim to have the superior and "real" fighters.

Kiyoshi Tamura had left UWFi before the feud in 1995, to join rival promotion, RINGS.

In 1996, as the New Japan feud died down, UWFi formed an alliance with Genichiro Tenryu's WAR.

On August 17, 1996, Takada defeated Yoji Anjo at Tokyo's Meiji-Jingu Stadium. The damage to the promotion's credibility had already been done, however, and UWFi had its farewell card ("UWF FINAL") on December 27, 1996, at Tokyo's Korakuen Hall arena. Most of the UWFi roster formed Kingdom, which would promote a similar product on a smaller scale. Kingdom would have a presence at UFC Japan: Ultimate Japan in 1997, as Yoji Anjo would lose to Tank Abbott, while Kazushi Sakuraba won the heavyweight tournament. The promotion, however, failed to reach the same level of popularity as the UWFi and closed in March 1998.

Takada went on to become one of the founding figures of Pride Fighting Championships. He faced Rickson Gracie in the main event of the inaugural Pride event on October 11, 1997, losing by submission in the second round. The bout was the culmination of the rivalry that had begun with Yoji Anjo's dojo storm in 1994 and helped establish Pride as the major mixed martial arts promotion in Japan and the world. Takada later served as one of Pride's most prominent executives and public figures, while several former UWFi and Kingdom wrestlers, most notably Kazushi Sakuraba, who had been a relatively low-card wrestler during his UWFi tenure, became major stars in the promotion. Sakuraba's victories over members of the Gracie family would eventually make him one of Pride's biggest attractions and further connect the promotion's history to the UWFi's earlier pursuit of "real" wrestling.

== Rules ==
The combatants would start with 15 points each. Points would be lost for knockout attempts, being at a disadvantage during a hold, and/or for breaking a hold by grabbing onto the ring ropes with hand(s) and/or feet. The only way to win was by submission, knockout (count of 10) or a wrestler's points being reduced to 0.

Tag team matches were allowed as well, with 21 points (instead of 15) given to a team at start time. However, the points system was rarely referred to, as a wrestler or team losing points could still win by forcing his opponent to submit or by knocking him out. No pinfall counts were allowed, and no countouts were allowed (in practice, wrestlers never set foot outside the ring during the match). Similarly, six-man tag team matches occurred, but were rare, with 30 points given to a team at start time.

In 1995, rules were somewhat relaxed to allow pinfalls in order to allow for New Japan, WAR, and other non-submission-oriented wrestlers (such as Abdullah the Butcher) to compete.

In 2017 an American independent promotion, Paradigm Pro Wrestling, based in Jeffersonville, Indiana, revived the rules for its matches.

== Roster ==
Natives:

- Nobuhiko Takada
- Kazuo Yamazaki
- Naoki Sano
- Kazushi Sakuraba
- Yoshihiro Takayama
- Kōji Kitao
- Masahito Kakihara
- Yoji Anjo
- Tatsuo Nakano
- Hiromitsu Kanehara
- Kenichi Yamamoto
- Yuko Miyato
- Masakazu Maeda
- Kiyoshi Tamura
- Makoto Oe (kickboxer)

Foreigners:

- Super Vader
- Gary Albright
- Dan Severn
- Mark Fleming
- Victor Zangiev
- Salman Hashimikov
- Vladimir Berkovitch
- The Iron Sheik
- Bob Backlund
- Gene Lydick
- J. T. Southern
- James Stone
- Bad News Allen
- Tom Burton
- Steve Nelson
- Mark Silver
- Billy Scott
- Dennis Koslowski
- Tommy Cairo
- Steve Cox
- Greg Bobchick
- Pez Whatley
- Jim Boss
- Matthew Saad Muhammad
- Bowy Chowaikun (kickboxer)
- Danny Steel (kickboxer)
- Norman Smiley
- Raymond Lloyd

== Championships ==
=== Pro-Wrestling World Heavyweight Championship ===
The championship used the belt used by Lou Thesz as NWA World Champion during the 1950s.

Key
No.	Overall reign number
Reign	Reign number for the specific champion
Days	Number of days held
Defenses	Number of successful defenses

No.	Champion	Championship change			Reign statistics			Notes	Ref.
No.	Champion	Date	Event	Location	Reign	Days	Defenses	Notes	Ref.
1	Nobuhiko Takada	September 21, 1992	Pro-Wrestling Heavyweight Championship Match	Osaka, Japan	1	696	2	Defeated Gary Albright to become the first champion; Takada and Albright had been chosen as contenders based on their UWFi records (11 wins and no losses for Albright; 10 wins and 1 loss for Takada).	
2	Super Vader	August 18, 1994	Pro-Wrestling World Tournament Final 1994	Tokyo, Japan	1	245	1	This was the final of the Best of the World 1994 tournament.	
3	Nobuhiko Takada	April 20, 1995	Pro-Wrestling Heavyweight Championship Match	Nagoya, Japan	2	165	0		
—	Deactivated	October 2, 1995	—	—	—	—	—	Lou Thesz withdrew his support for the promotion and took the belt with him in protest against a proposed unification match against IWGP Heavyweight Champion Keiji Muto. Takada went on to defeat Muto on January 4, 1996, winning the IWGP title.	

=== Combined reigns ===
Rank^{[A]}	Wrestler	No. of reigns	Combined days
1	Nobuhiko Takada	2	861
2	Super Vader	1	245

== Video game ==
In 1995, Hudson Soft published a video game, Saikyō: Takada Nobuhiko (最強～高田延彦～) for the Super Famicom in Japan. Unlike most wrestling games, Saikyō was a linear fighting game, but moves such as suplexes counted for heavy scoring, like in the real-life promotion. Nobuhiko Takada was the only actual wrestler licensed as a character, all others used made-up pseudonyms made through alterations of their kana or kanji names, such as Gary Albright being known as Gary Briant.

== See also ==
- Professional wrestling in Japan
