= Kendo Kashin =

Japanese professional wrestler

Kendo Kashin ケンドー・カシン
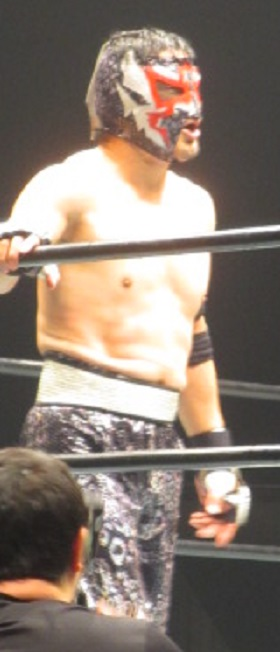
- Kashin in July 2017

Personal information
- Born: Tokimitsu Ishizawa; August 5, 1968 (age 58) Minamitsugaru, Aomori, Japan

Professional wrestling career
- Ring name(s): Dragon Soldier B Kendo Kashin; Kendo Ka Shin; Tokimitsu Ishizawa
- Billed height: 1.80 m (5 ft 11 in)
- Billed weight: 92 kg (203 lb)
- Trained by: Antonio Inoki; NJPW Dojo
- Debut: September 21, 1992
- Mixed martial arts career Martial arts career
- Nationality: Japanese
- Height: 1.8 m (5 ft 11 in)
- Weight: 92 kg (203 lb; 14 st 7 lb)
- Style: MMA; Shooto, Pankration
- Team: NJPW Dojo

Tokimitsu Ishizawa (Japanese: 石澤 常光Ishizawa Tokimitsu, born August 5, 1968), better known by his ring name Kendo Kashin (ケンドー・カシン, Kendō Kashin), is a Japanese professional wrestler. He is perhaps best known for his time in New Japan Pro-Wrestling (NJPW), where he was a two time IWGP Junior Heavyweight Champion, a one time IWGP Junior Heavyweight Tag Team Champion, and the winner of the 1999 Best of the Super Juniors. He is also known for his forays into mixed martial arts, most notably for Pride Fighting Championship (Pride), where he defeated Gracie Jiu Jitsu fighter Ryan Gracie at PRIDE 15. He currently wrestles for Pro Wrestling Noah.

== Career ==
Ishizawa was an outstanding Amateur wrestler from Waseda University before being scouted and initiated into the New Japan Pro-Wrestling (NJPW) promotion on September 21, 1992, wrestling against Tiger Mask. During the NJPW vs. UWFi feud, he was taught the shoot style by Kazuo Yamazaki. After defeating Yuji Nagata to win the 1996 Young Lion Cup, he left on a learning excursion to Austria's CWA promotion, where he disguised himself under a mask and called himself Kendo Kashin.

He returned to New Japan as Kashin in May 1997 at the Osaka Dome, facing his mentor, Kazuo Yamazaki. Kashin quickly rose up the ranks of the Junior Heavyweight division, utilizing a cross armbreaker and other armbar techniques to quickly submit opponents. After defeating Koji Kanemoto to win the 1999 Best of the Super Juniors Tournament, he defeated Kanemoto again in August of that year to capture the IWGP Junior Heavyweight Championship for the first time.

In August 2000 Ishizawa ventured into the mixed martial arts world and fought under his real name and without the mask in PRIDE 10. He lost his match with Ryan Gracie by TKO in little more than two minutes. Continuing to suffer many losses, Kashin took several months off from New Japan to train. In July 2001 Ishizawa challenged Ryan for a rematch at PRIDE 15. This time he TKO'd Ryan in under 5 minutes. That same month he returned to New Japan as Kendo Kashin and won the IWGP Junior Heavyweight Title for the second time by defeating Masayuki Naruse.

In January 2002, while he was still champion, he followed fellow New Japan stars Keiji Mutoh and Satoshi Kojima to rival promotion All Japan Pro Wrestling. In All Japan, Kashin quickly established himself as the Junior ace, submitting Masanobu Fuchi to win the vacant World Junior Heavyweight Championship. He also won the World Tag Team Championship with Yuji Nagata.

In 2004 Kashin split from All Japan to become a freelancer, taking one of the two World Tag Team Championship belts with him, with Nagata taking the other. The championship was later declared vacant by AJPW six months later.

In 2005 he returned to New Japan as a regular for a few months, working through the Inoki Office agency. The agency and New Japan's association ended in late 2005. On April 2, 2005, Kashin competed under a mask as Dragon Soldier B in Ring of Honor's Best of the American Super Juniors Tournament.

After a long hiatus from wrestling, Kashin returned on December 20, 2007, at the Inoki Genome Federation's show in Tokyo and faced off against Kurt Angle for IGF's version of the IWGP World Heavyweight Championship in a losing effort.

Kendo returned to the ring for IGF in 2012. In March 2014, Kashin returned to All Japan Pro Wrestling, announcing his participation in the 2014 Champion Carnival. Kashin faced 2 Cold Scorpio for the WPW title in a losing effort at Cheltenham Town Hall on February 18, 2018, at SuperClash.

On 14 August 2019, it was announced that Kashin has joined the WWE Performance Centre as a coach. He was released on April 15, 2020.

On July 19, 2020, Kashin returned to the ring in Japan and appeared for Pro Wrestling Noah for their 'In the Spotlight' series.

== Championships and accomplishments ==
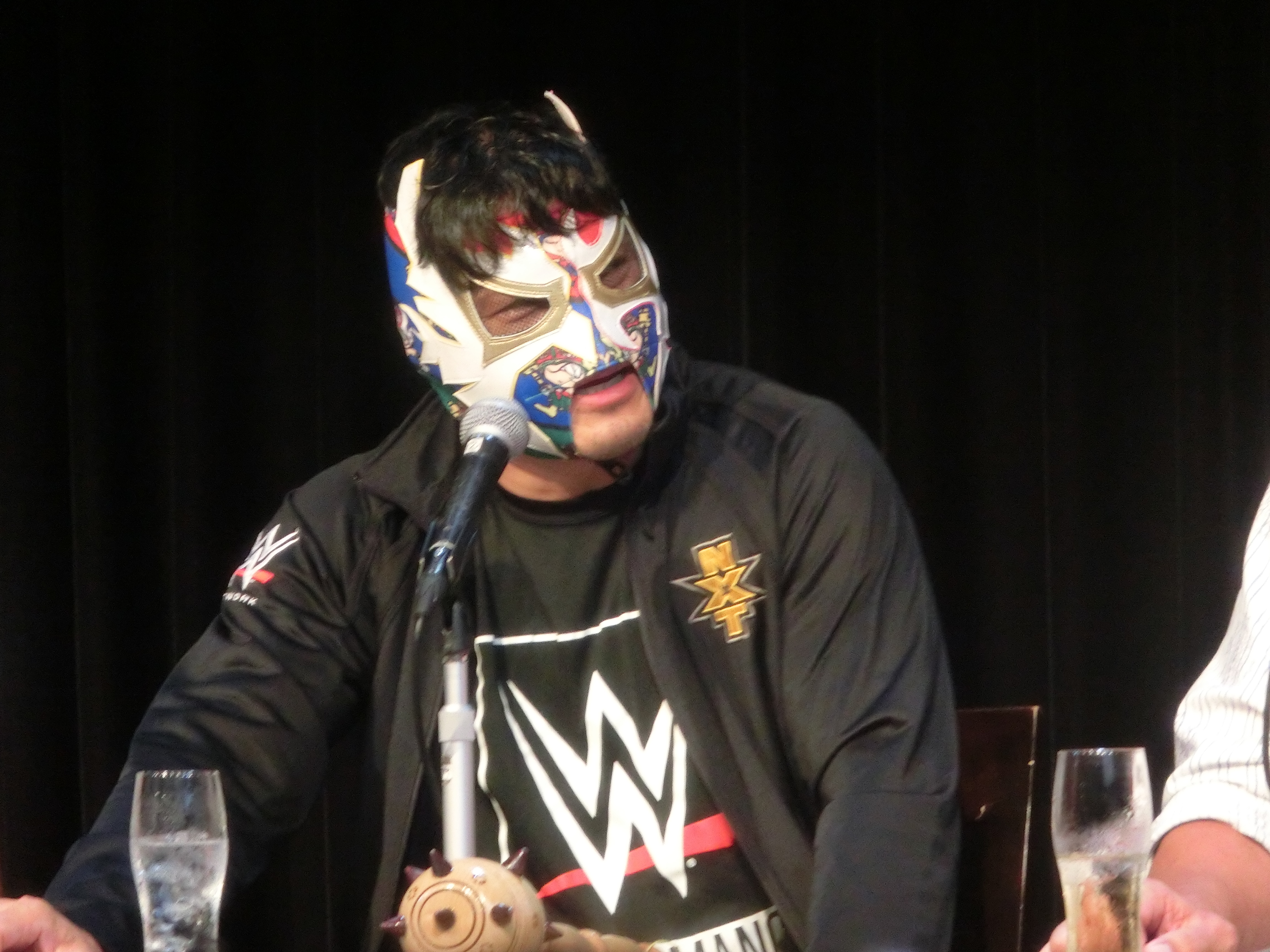
Kashin in 2019.

- All Japan Pro Wrestling
  - World Junior Heavyweight Championship (1 time)
  - World Tag Team Championship (1 time) - with Yuji Nagata
  - All Asia Tag Team Championship (1 time) – with Nosawa Rongai
  - January 3 Korakuen Hall Junior Heavyweight Battle Royal (2003)
- Catch Wrestling Association
  - CWA World Junior Heavyweight Championship (1 time)
- Dramatic Dream Team
  - DDT Extreme Championship (1 time)
- European Wrestling Promotion
  - EWP Intercontinental Championship (1 time)
  - EWP Tag Team Championship (1 time) - with Toru Yano
- New Japan Pro-Wrestling
  - IWGP Junior Heavyweight Championship (2 times)
  - IWGP Junior Heavyweight Tag Team Championship (1 time) - with Dr. Wagner, Jr.
  - Best of the Super Juniors (1999)
  - Young Lion Cup (1996)
- Nikkan Sports
  - Technique Award (1999)
- Pro Wrestling Illustrated
  - PWI ranked him #22 of the 500 best singles wrestlers of the PWI 500 in 2002
  - PWI ranked him #351 of the 500 best singles wrestlers during the PWI Years in 2003
- Ring of Honor
  - Best of the American Super Juniors (2005)

== Mixed martial arts record ==
Professional record breakdown
7 matches	1 win	5 losses
By knockout	1	4
By submission	0	1
By decision	0	0
Draws	1	

Res.	Record	Opponent	Method	Event	Date	Round	Time	Location	Notes
Loss	1–5–1	Katsuyori Shibata	TKO (punches)	Dream 12	October 25, 2009	1	4:52	Osaka, Japan	
Loss	1–4–1	Taiei Kin	KO (head kick)	K-1 PREMIUM 2006 Dynamite!!	December 31, 2006	1	2:48	Osaka, Japan	
Loss	1–3–1	Carlos Newton	TKO (punches)	Hero's 7	October 9, 2006	1	0:22	Yokohama, Japan	
Loss	1–2–1	Yoshihiro Akiyama	Submission (ezekiel choke)	Hero's 4	March 15, 2006	2	1:41	Tokyo, Japan	
Draw	1–1–1	Shingo Koyasu	Draw	Inoki Bom-Ba-Ye 2001	December 31, 2001	5	3:00	Saitama, Japan	K-1 vs. Pride rules
Win	1–1	Ryan Gracie	TKO (injury)	Pride 15	July 29, 2001	1	4:51	Saitama, Japan	
Loss	0–1	Ryan Gracie	KO (punches)	Pride 10 - Return of the Warriors	August 27, 2000	1	2:16	Saitama, Japan	
