= Kazuo Yamazaki =

Japanese professional wrestler

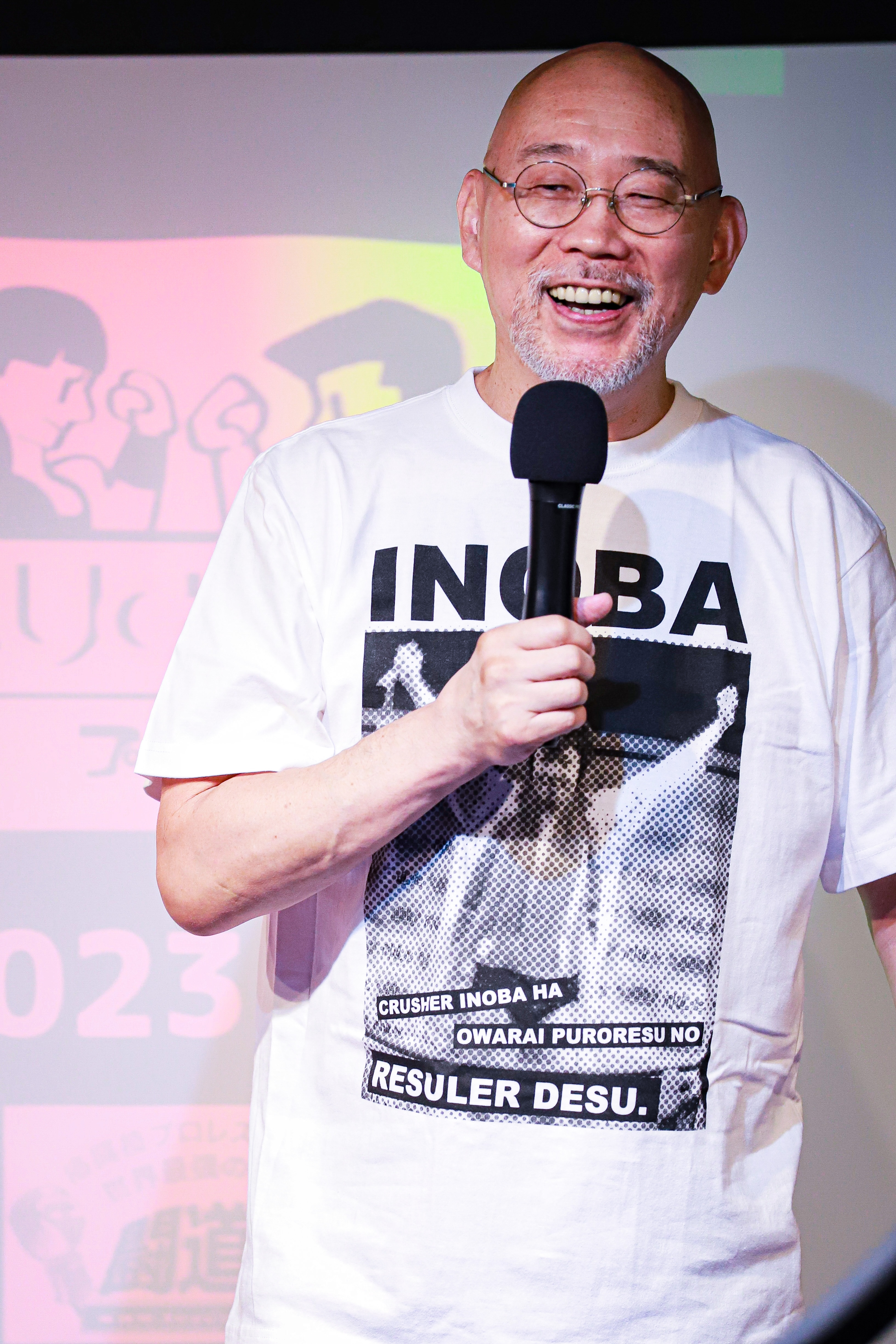
- Yamazaki in 2023

Personal information
- Born: August 15, 1962 (age 63) Tokyo, Japan

Professional wrestling career
- Billed height: 1.88 m (6 ft 2 in)
- Billed weight: 103 kg (227 lb)
- Trained by: Satoru Sayama; Yoshiaki Fujiwara
- Debut: May 6, 1982
- Retired: January 4, 2000

Kazuo Yamazaki (山崎一夫, Yamazaki Kazuo; born August 15, 1962) is a Japanese retired professional wrestler, wrestling instructor and commentator who is known for his work in New Japan Pro-Wrestling (NJPW), and shoot-style promotions Universal Wrestling Federation (UWF) and UWF International (UWFi). He is signed as a commentator for New Japan Pro-Wrestling (NJPW).

== Professional wrestling career ==
=== New Japan Pro-Wrestling (1982–1984) ===
An amateur wrestler and high school judoka in his youth, Yamazaki's professional wrestling career began in May 1982 in New Japan Pro-Wrestling. He wrestled his debut match on May 6 against Kuroneko. During this time, he was also a student of Satoru Sayama, better known as Tiger Mask, who trained Yamazaki extensively in shoot wrestling and kickboxing. He also trained under NJPW's head submission grappling instructor Yoshiaki Fujiwara. Whenever Kuniaki Kobayashi stripped Sayama of his mask, Yamazaki was always the first to help remask him.

=== Universal Wrestling Federation (1984–1985) ===
In 1984, Yamazaki joined the shoot style promotion Japanese UWF, an early precursor to modern mixed martial arts. However, differences between his mentor Satoru Sayama and Akira Maeda over direction caused the promotion to fail.

=== Return To NJPW (1985–1988) ===
He rejoined New Japan in 1985 as a junior heavyweight. Despite this, he found more success in tag teams in 1987, winning the IWGP Tag Team Championship with one of his mentors, Yoshiaki Fujiwara.

=== Newborn UWF (1988–1990) ===
In 1988, however, the UWF was reconstituted as Newborn UWF and Yamazaki joined it, and stayed there until it folded in December 1990. During this time, he moved up to heavyweight.

=== UWF International (1991–1995) ===
In May 1991, Yamazaki joined UWF International. In UWF International, he supported Nobuhiko Takada, but after being overlooked several times for shots at Takada's UWFI World Heavyweight championship, he decided to quit and return to New Japan on his own in July 1995.

=== Return To NJPW (1995–2000) ===
During the New Japan vs. UWFI feud in 1995-1996, Yamazaki participated on New Japan's side, but mostly as a behind-the-scenes supporter, training Yuji Nagata and Tokimitsu Ishizawa (Kendo Ka Shin) in the use of the shoot-style. He won two more IWGP Tag Team Championships, first with Takashi Iizuka in June 1996 and with Kensuke Sasaki in August 1997. In 1998, he participated in the G1 Climax tournament, defeating Tatsumi Fujinami, Kensuke Sasaki, and Masahiro Chono, before losing to Shinya Hashimoto in the finals. Yamazaki retired from in-ring competition on January 4, 2000, losing to his student Yuji Nagata as his final opponent.

== Retirement ==
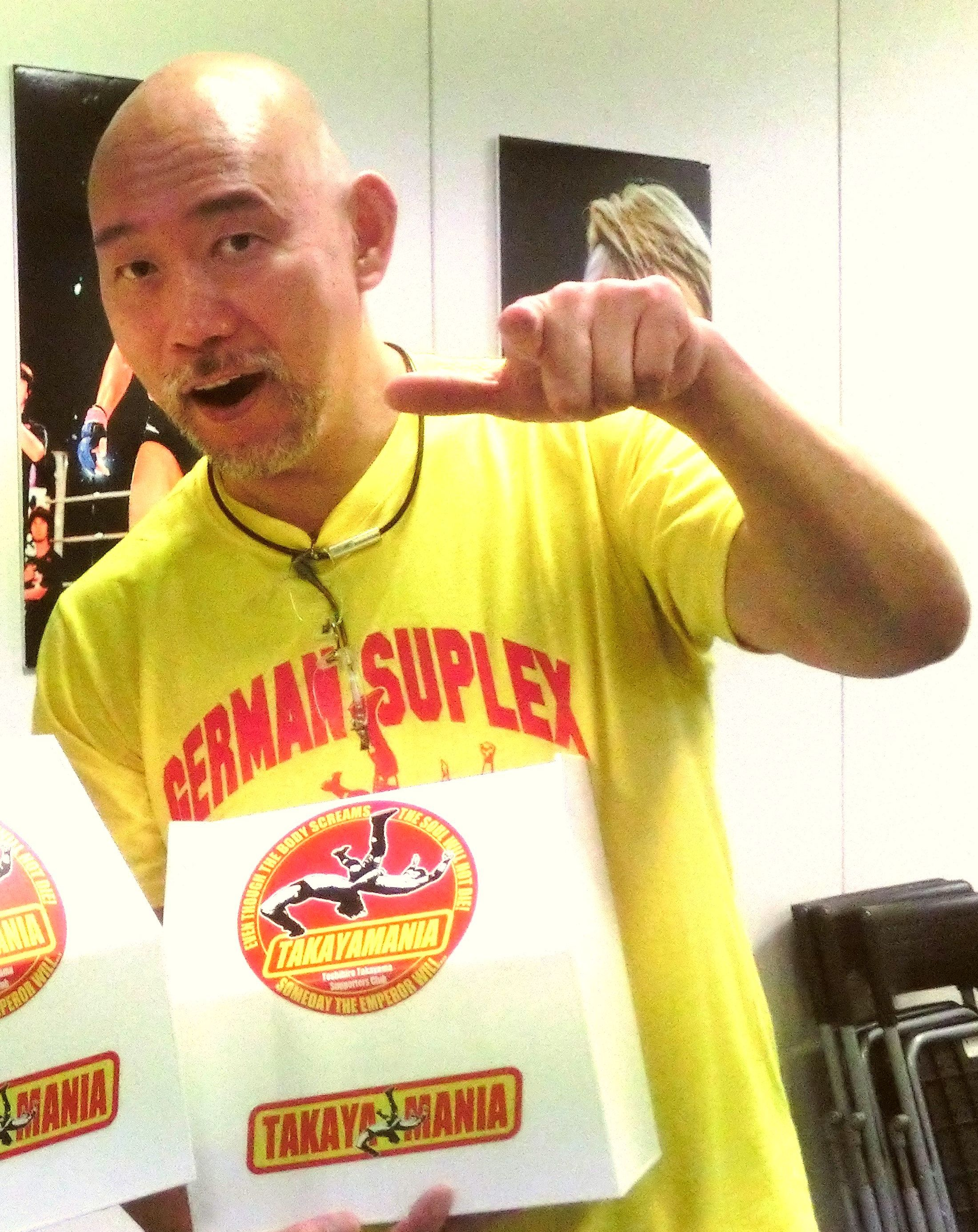
Yamazaki in 2018

Kazuo Yamazaki now works as a wrestling instructor at the NJPW Dojo and sometimes acts as color commentator for the NJPW program on TV Asahi. He also works as a seitaishi in Ayase, Kanagawa.

== Championships and accomplishments ==
- New Japan Pro-Wrestling
  - IWGP Tag Team Championship (3 times) – with Yoshiaki Fujiwara (1), Takashi Iizuka (1), and Kensuke Sasaki (1)
  - G1 Climax Special Tag Team Tournament (1997) – with Kensuke Sasaki
- Pro Wrestling Illustrated
  - PWI ranked him #92 of the 500 best singles wrestlers of the year in the PWI 500 in 1997
  - PWI ranked him #310 of the Top 500 Singles Wrestlers of the "PWI Years" in 2003
- Universal Wrestling Federation
  - Kakuto Nettai Road "B" League Tournament (1985)
