= Shinya Hashimoto =

Japanese professional wrestler (1965–2005)

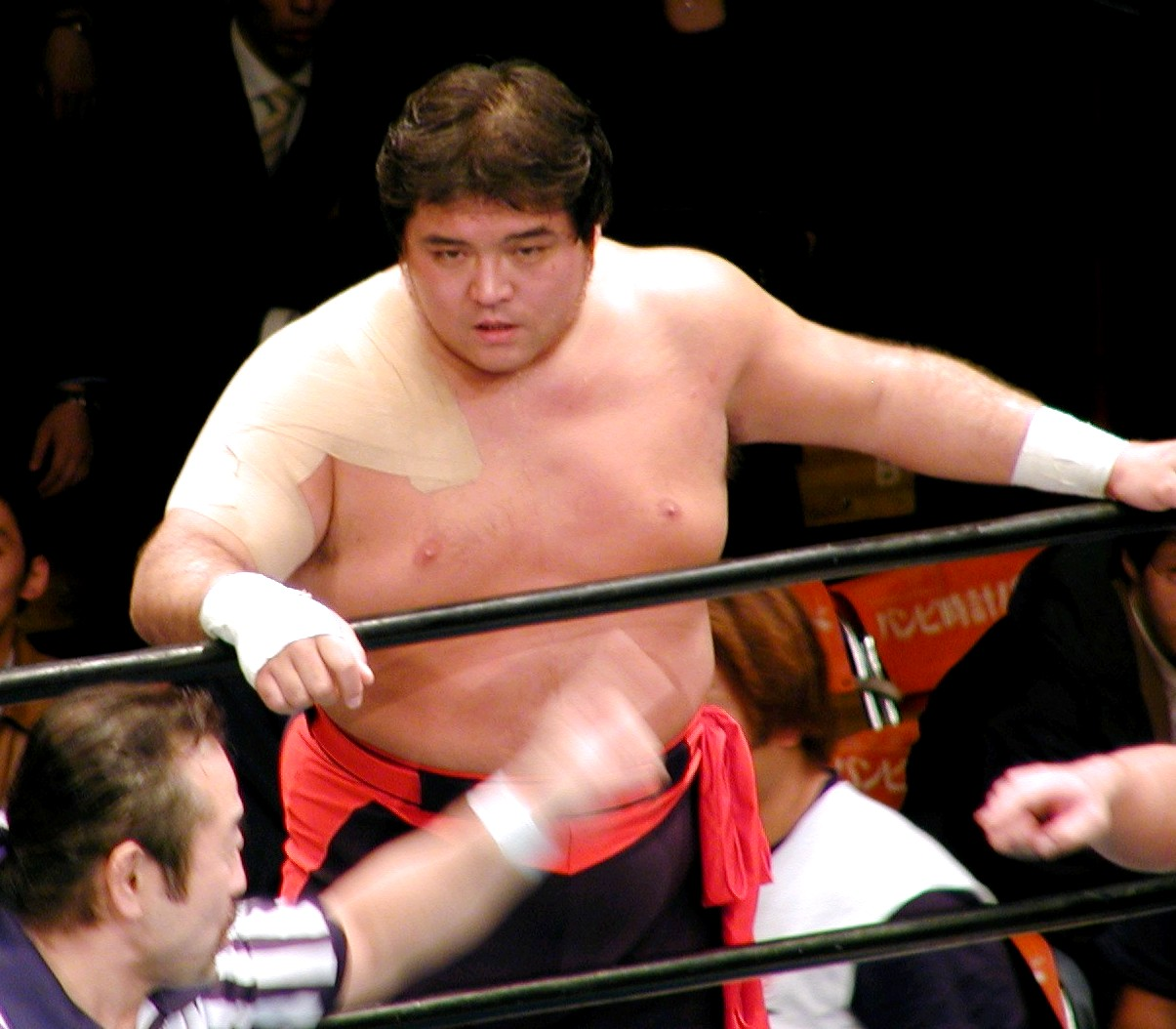
- Hashimoto in 2004

Personal information
- Born: July 3, 1965 Toki City, Gifu, Japan
- Died: July 11, 2005 (aged 40) Yokohama, Japan
- Cause of death: Brain hemorrhage
- Family: Daichi Hashimoto (son)

Professional wrestling career
- Ring name(s): Hashif Khan; Shinya Hashimoto; Shogun
- Billed height: 1.80 m (5 ft 11 in)
- Billed weight: 130 kg (287 lb)
- Trained by: Antonio Inoki; Stu Hart; Tokyo Joe
- Debut: September 1, 1984
- Retired: September 2, 2004

Shinya Hashimoto (橋本 真也, Hashimoto Shin'ya; July 3, 1965 – July 11, 2005) was a Japanese professional wrestler, promoter and actor. Along with Masahiro Chono and Keiji Mutoh, Hashimoto was dubbed one of the "Three Musketeers" that began competing in New Japan Pro-Wrestling (NJPW) in the mid-1980s and dominated the promotion in the 1990s.

He is one of three wrestlers (the others being Keiji Mutoh and Satoshi Kojima) that have held the NWA World Heavyweight Championship, the Triple Crown Heavyweight Championship and the IWGP Heavyweight Championship and is an overall five-time world champion.

== Professional wrestling career ==
=== Early years (1984–1988) ===
Hashimoto grew up in Toki City in Gifu and began training in judo and karate in his late teens. His training helped him in his transition to professional wrestling, as he joined the NJPW Dojo in April 1984. He made his debut for NJPW in September 1984 at the age of 19, wrestling against Tatsutoshi Goto. Hashimoto worked on becoming a skilled wrestler over the next few years, traveling whenever necessary to gain more seasoning, such as over in the United States (Continental Wrestling Association), Canada (Stampede Wrestling), and Puerto Rico (World Wrestling Council).

It was in Puerto Rico in 1988 that Hashimoto formed The Three Musketeers with Masahiro Chono and Keiji Mutoh.

=== New Japan Pro-Wrestling (1988–2000) ===
Upon Hashimoto's return to New Japan in July 1988, he started to climb his way up the NJPW ladder. By this time, he introduced a martial artist gimmick based on his background, which he represented by wearing a hachimaki during his ring entrances and utilizing a wrestling style based on shoot kicks, karate strikes, and submission holds. In April 1989, he took part in the IWGP Heavyweight Championship tournament at New Japan's first show in the Tokyo Dome, Battle Satellite in Tokyo Dome he defeated Riki Choshu and Victor Zangiev, before losing to Big Van Vader in the finals. In September 1989, Hashimoto teamed with Masa Saito to win his first gold, the IWGP Tag Team Championship, beating Choshu and Takayuki Iizuka. The two held the belts until the next year, losing in April 1990 to two other up-and-comers: Masahiro Chono and Keiji Mutoh.

In August 1991, Hashimoto, Chono, and Mutoh cemented their status as the aces of NJPW during the G1 Climax, surpassing longtime aces Antonio Inoki, Tatsumi Fujinami, and Riki Choshu. In July 1992, he replaced an eye injured Akira Nogami (where it turns out, it was a kick by Hashimoto that caused the injury on June 20) to team with Hiroshi Hase to participate in the NWA World Tag Team Championship tournament held by World Championship Wrestling and they defeated The Fabulous Freebirds in the quarterfinals, before losing to Dustin Rhodes and Barry Windham in the semi-finals. Hashimoto finally hit the big time in 1993, as he won the IWGP Heavyweight Championship from the Great Muta in September. Hashimoto held the biggest belt in NJPW for the next seven months before being taken down by the legendary Tatsumi Fujinami. Hashimoto regained the gold only a month later, in May 1994. For the next year, Hashimoto stayed a dominating force in New Japan, defeating challenger after challenger. Hashimoto reigned as the IWGP Heavyweight Champion for over a year, losing the belt to Mutoh only two days after celebrating the milestone.

A few months after losing the gold, Hashimoto teamed up with Junji Hirata in July 1995 to face and defeat Scott Norton and Mike Enos to win the vacated IWGP Tag Team Championship, making Hashimoto a two-time champion in both divisions. Soon, Hashimoto enjoyed another lengthy championship run, as he and Hirata remained the champions for almost another year. Hashimoto also became a double champion, as he defeated Nobuhiko Takada to regain the IWGP Heavyweight Title on April 29, 1996. Hashimoto and Hirata lost the tag title in June 1996, when they fell to Takashi Iizuka and Kazuo Yamazaki. Hashimoto soldiered on to focus solely on the singles gold, as he worked on another lengthy run. In 1997, he was presented with a new championship belt (the second-generation IWGP Heavyweight Championship). On August 31, 1997, Hashimoto lost the title to Kensuke Sasaki, after reigning as a champion for a record-breaking 489 days (the record has since been broken by Kazuchika Okada in 2017). Hashimoto continued to work for NJPW for the next few years, earning another great honor by winning the G1 Climax in 1998.

Hashimoto launched into a brutal rivalry against Judo champion Naoya Ogawa in 1997, leading to Hashimoto vowing to retire from NJPW if he lost again, which happened in April 2000. He stayed at New Japan for the New Japan/All Japan "Do Judge!" card on October 9, where he defeated Tatsumi Fujinami by submission, and also appeared at the Great Voyage 2000 event for Pro Wrestling Noah on December 23, where he defeated Takao Omori, but he later left NJPW as promised.

==== Different Style Fights (1990–1998) ====
Between 1990 and 1998, Hashimoto took part in various worked mixed martial arts-like worked bouts in NJPW, called "Different Style Fights", where he defeated the likes of Tony Halme, Ramzan Shibiev, and Dennis Lane. Most of the bouts lasted from 3 to 14 minutes and usually ended via submission or knockout.

Due to his success at this field, Hashimoto was scouted by K-1 executive Kazuyoshi Ishii to compete in their '93 GP tournament, but he declined. He was also invited to a 1994 all-star shoot wrestling tournament in Union of Wrestling Forces International, NJPW's rival promotion, in which the winner would receive a hundred million yen prize, but he refused again.

=== Pro Wrestling Zero-One (2001–2005) ===
Hashimoto registered the Pro Wrestling Zero-One name on November 13, 2000, after being fired from New Japan Pro-Wrestling, and the promotion had its first show on March 2, 2001. Hashimoto challenged Steve Corino for the NWA World Heavyweight Championship in October 2001. The match ended in controversy, leading to the belt being vacated. In December 2001, Hashimoto faced off against Corino and Gary Steele in a Triple Threat Match, winning the vacated NWA World Heavyweight Title. Hashimoto's NWA World Title reign would come to an end in March 2002 through duplicitous means, as a crooked referee gave a fast count, allowing Dan Severn to win the title. Hashimoto then went back to concentrating on Zero-One, where he was an active competitor. In October 2002, Hashimoto teamed with his old rival, Naoya Ogawa, to win the NWA Intercontinental Tag-Team Title (which were usually defended in Zero-One) from John Heidenreich and Nathan Jones. The two defended the championship for the next few months, before falling to Matt Ghaffari and Tom Howard in December 2002. The two teams feuded on and off over the next few months, even as Hashimoto looked to another organization for a major accomplishment.

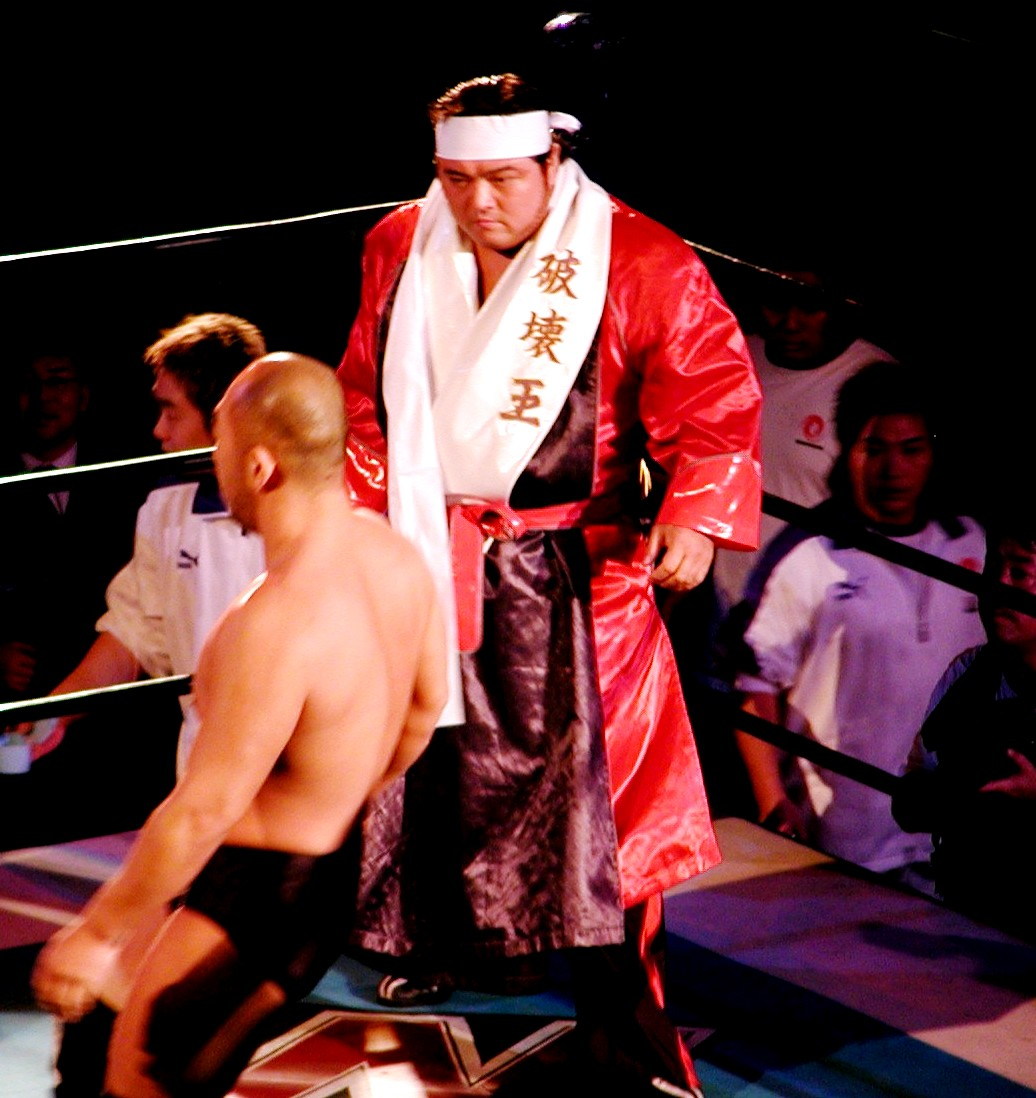
Hashimoto in January 2004

On February 23, 2003, Hashimoto defeated the Great Muta to win All Japan Pro Wrestling's Triple Crown Heavyweight Championship; as a result, Hashimoto became only the second man to have held the NJPW, AJPW, and NWA World Titles (as Keiji Mutoh was the first). Hashimoto and Ogawa won back the NWA Intercontinental Tag Team Title from Ghaffari and Howard in April 2003. However, due to Ogaya having thrown Ghaffari over the top rope at one point in the match, NWA President Richard Arpin stripped them of the championship a few days later, as throwing an opponent over the top rope is against the rules in the NWA. Hashimoto's Triple Crown would face a similar fate, as Hashimoto suffered a shoulder injury in July 2003 and had to vacate the belt.

Despite the build-up of several injuries, Hashimoto continued to wrestle on and off in Zero-One, including teaming with Yoshiaki Fujiwara to get the NWA Intercontinental Tag-Team Titles for a third time, defeating Takao Omori and Shiro Koshinaka in June 2004. The two remained the champions until before Omori found a new partner in Shinjiro Otani to win the championship in August 2004. Going into 2005, Hashimoto left Zero-One and placed Otani in charge, citing financial problems as the reason for his departure.

== Personal life ==
Hashimoto has a son, Daichi Hashimoto, who made his pro wrestling debut for the Zero1 promotion at their 10th Anniversary Show on March 6, 2011, facing Masahiro Chono in a losing effort. He also left behind two young daughters.

== Death ==
Hashimoto suddenly died of a brain aneurysm on July 11, 2005; he was pronounced dead at 10:36 a.m. while en route to the hospital. Hashimoto's sister Masanari claimed that Hashimoto had been complaining about chest pains and thought that his heart was beating too fast a week prior to his death, but refused to contact his doctor about the conditions. Hashimoto had a heart problem in 2004 and was put on medicine, but he had to stop taking it after having shoulder surgery. Hashimoto's doctor claimed that high blood pressure was the most likely cause for his brain hemorrhage and proposed that other stress over the years led to these problems.

=== Tributes ===
In the years following Hashimoto's death, numerous wrestlers and promotions have paid tribute to him. Immediately following his death, New Japan retired the second IWGP Heavyweight Championship belt as Hashimoto was the first to wear it. A third IWGP Title belt was created and debuted in October 2005, but New Japan lost it in July 2006 when Brock Lesnar left New Japan and took the belt with him which forced New Japan to bring the second belt back. After regaining the third belt in February 2008 and the creation of the fourth IWGP Title belt, the second was retired once again. On March 2, 2008, then IWGP Heavyweight Champion: Shinsuke Nakamura visited ZERO1 for their anniversary show where he defeated Kohei Sato. After the match, he gave the second IWGP Title belt to Hashimoto's son, Daichi.

In August 2005, Masahiro Chono used Hashimoto's Bakusho Sengen theme during the final match of the 2005 G1 Climax. At PRIDE Shockwave 2005, Naoya Ogawa wore Hashimoto's signature headband and came out to Bakusho Sengen for his fight against Hidehiko Yoshida. In late 2005, Hashimoto was posthumously awarded an achievement award by Tokyo Sports. At Wrestle Kingdom in Tokyo Dome on January 4, 2007, Chono and Mutoh paid tribute after defeating Tencozy as they wore Hashimoto's headbands while his theme song played. On September 21, 2009, ZERO1 held the Shinya Hashimoto 25th Anniversary Destructive King Legend In Korakuen Hall show which celebrated Hashimoto's would be 25th anniversary. In 2010, Hashimoto was inducted into both New Japan's Greatest Wrestlers Hall of Fame and the NWA Hall of Fame.

== Championships and accomplishments ==
- All Japan Pro Wrestling
  - Triple Crown Heavyweight Championship (1 time)
- National Wrestling Alliance
  - NWA Hall of Fame (Class of 2010)
- NWA Pro-Wrestling Xpress
  - NWA World Heavyweight Championship (1 time)
- New Japan Pro-Wrestling
  - IWGP Heavyweight Championship (3 times)
  - IWGP Tag Team Championship (2 times) – with Masa Saito (1) and Junji Hirata (1)
  - G1 Climax (1998)
  - Kyushu Cup (1990)
  - IWGP Tag Team Title Challenger Decision League (1989) - with Masa Saito
  - Super Grade Tag League (1992) – with Riki Choshu
  - Super Grade Tag League (1996) – with Scott Norton
  - Greatest Wrestlers (Class of 2010)
- Nikkan Sports
  - Match of The Year (1996) vs. Nobuhiko Takada on April 29
- Pro Wrestling Zero-One
  - NWA Intercontinental Tag Team Championship (3 times) – with Naoya Ogawa (2) Yoshiaki Fujiwara (1)
- Pro Wrestling Illustrated
  - Ranked No. 7 of the 500 best singles wrestlers for the PWI 500 in 1997.
  - Ranked No. 45 of the 500 best singles wrestlers for the "PWI Years" in 2003.
- Tokyo Sports
  - Achievement Award (2005)
  - Fighting Spirit Award (1993)
  - Outstanding Performance Award (1989)
  - Wrestler of the Year (1994)
- Wrestling Observer Newsletter
  - Wrestling Observer Newsletter Hall of Fame (Class of 2000)

== Filmography ==
Year	Title	Role
1998	Ultraman Gaia - Episode 34	Himself
2002	Muscle Heat	Wrestler
2003	Kimi wa Petto - Episode 7	Himself
2004	Rikidozan	Azumanami
2004	Oh! My Zombie Mermaid (A! Ikkenya Puroresu)	Kota Shishio
2005	Sakigake!! Kuromati Kōkō: The Movie	Himself

== See also ==
- List of premature professional wrestling deaths
