= 1940 in professional wrestling =

1940 in professional wrestling describes the year's events in the world of professional wrestling.

== List of notable promotions ==
Only one promotion held notable shows in 1940.

Promotion Name	Abbreviation
Empresa Mexicana de Lucha Libre	EMLL

== Calendar of notable shows ==
Date	Promotion(s)	Event	Location	Main Event
September 12	EMLL	EMLL 7th Anniversary Show	Mexico City, Mexico	Tarzán López (c) defeated John Nemenic in a singles match for the NWA World Middleweight Championship
(c) – denotes defending champion(s)

== Notable events ==
- June 23 – The first Lucha de Apuestas (Spanish for "Bet match") takes place in Mexico with El Murciélago Enmascarado defeated Merced Gómez to force Gómez to be shaved bald. If he had lost El Murciélago Enmascarado would have had to unmask. The Lucha de Apuestas match would become the most prestigious match type in Mexico subsequently.

== Championship changes ==
=== EMLL ===
NWA World Middleweight Championship
incoming champion – Octavio Gaona
Date	Winner	Event/Show	Note(s)
February 19	Tarzán López	EMLL show	

Mexican National Heavyweight Championship
Incoming champion – Francisco Aguayo
Date	Winner	Event/Show	Note(s)
Uncertain	Vacant	N/A	
Uncertain	Firpo Segura	EMLL show	

Mexican National Featherweight Championship
Incoming champion – Luis Robles
No title changes

Mexican National Lightweight Championship
Incoming champion – Jack O'Brien
Date	Winner	Event/Show	Note(s)
May 5	Bobby Bonales	EMLL show	
December 12	Dientes Hernandez	EMLL show	

Mexican National Middleweight Championship
Incoming champion – Tarzán López
No title changes

Mexican National Welterweight Championship
Incoming champion – Tarzán López
Date	Winner	Event/Show	Note(s)
February 3	Bobby Arreola	EMLL show	
Uncertain	Vacant	EMLL show	

NWA World Middleweight Championship
Incoming champion – Octavio Gaona
Date	Winner	Event/Show	Note(s)
February 4	Tarzán López	EMLL show	

== Lucha de Apuestas matches ==
Winner (wager)	Loser (wager)	Location	Event	Date	Notes
El Murciélago Enmascarado (mask)	Merced Gómez (hair)	Mexico City	EMLL show	June 23, 1940	
El Murciélago Enmascarado (mask)	Bobby Bonales (hair)	Mexico City	EMLL show	June 30, 1940	
El Murciélago Enmascarado (mask)	Dientes Hernández (hair)	Mexico City	EMLL show	July 4, 1940	
El Murciélago Enmascarado (mask)	Ciclón Veloz (hair)	Mexico City	EMLL show	July 11, 1940	
Octavio Gaona (hair)	El Murciélago Enmascarado (mask)	Mexico City	EMLL show	July 18, 1940	

== Births ==
- Date of birth unknown
  - Espectro II(died in 1985)
- January 2 -
  - Jerry Monti (died 1999)
  - Motoko Baba(died in 2018)
- January 15 – Tommy Gilbert(died in 2015)
- February 5 – Luke Graham(died in 2006)
- February 11 – Espanto III(died in 1996)
- February 20 – Frankie Williams (died in 1991)
- March 24 – The Spoiler(died in 2006)
- March 25 -
  - Jim Breaks (died in 2023)
  - Joe Carollo (died in 2025)
- April 7 – Bruce Swayze (died in 2026)
- April 20 – El Matematico
- June 20 – Umanosuke Ueda(died in 2011)
- July 4 – Bob Sweetan(died in 2017)
- July 18 – Dean Ho (died in 2021)
- July 23 – Thunder Sugiyama (died in 2002)
- August 20 – Ken Lucas(died in 2014)
- August 25 – Wilhelm von Homburg (died in 2004)
- August 29 – Wim Ruska (died in 2015)
- September 3 – Spiros Arion
- September 15 – Man Mountain Mike(died in 1988)
- October 15 – Kay Noble (died in 2006)
- October 17 – Baron Von Raschke
- October 21 – Crusher Verdu (died in 2004)
- October 28 – Les Thatcher
- November 5 – Aníbal(died in 1994)
- November 30 – Johnny De Fazio (died in 2021)
- December 5 – Adrian Street(died in 2023)
- December 15 – Strong Kobayashi (died in 2021)

== Deaths ==
- March 26 – Dan Koloff 47
- June 27 – Emil Klank 64
- August 29 – Renato Gardini 51
- October 10 – Harold Angus 35
- November 21 – Ivan Linow 52
