= 1953 in professional wrestling =

1953 in professional wrestling describes the year's events in the world of professional wrestling.

== List of notable promotions ==
Only one promotion held notable shows in 1953.

| Promotion Name | Abbreviation |
|---|---|
| Empresa Mexicana de Lucha Libre | EMLL |

== Calendar of notable shows ==
| Date | Promotion(s) | Event | Location | Main Event |
|---|---|---|---|---|
| September 25 | EMLL | EMLL 20th Anniversary Show | Mexico City, Mexico | Blue Demon defeated El Santo (c) in a best two-out-of-three falls match for the NWA World Welterweight Championship |
(c) – denotes defending champion(s)

== Notable events ==
- July 30 – The Japan Pro Wrestling Alliance (日本プロレス協会, nihon puroresu kyōkai), Japan's first professional wrestling promotion, was created.
- Empresa Mexicana de Lucha Libre (EMLL) joined the National Wrestling Alliance (NWA) representing Mexico in the Alliance.

== Championship changes ==
=== EMLL ===
NWA World Middleweight Championship
incoming champion – Tarzán López
| Date | Winner | Event/Show | Note(s) |
| June 20 | Sugi Sito | EMLL show | |

NWA World Welterweight Championship
incoming champion – El Santo
| Date | Winner | Event/Show | Note(s) |
| September 25 | Blue Demon | EMLL show | |

Mexican National Heavyweight Championship
incoming champion - Firpo Segura
No title changes

Mexican National Middleweight Championship
incoming champion – Uncertain
No title changes

Mexican National Lightweight Championship
incoming champion – Black Shadow
No title changes

Mexican National Light Heavyweight Championship
incoming champion –Vacant
No title changes

Mexican National Welterweight Championship
incoming champion – El Santo
| Date | Winner | Event/Show | Note(s) |
| September 25 | Blue Demon | EMLL show | |
| Uncertain | Vacated | N/A | Championship vacated for undocumented reasons |

=== NWA ===
NWA Worlds Heavyweight Championship
Incoming Champion – Lou Thesz
| Date | Winner | Event/Show | Note(s) |
No title changes

== Debuts ==
- Debut date uncertain:
  - Black Gordman
  - George Cannon
  - Joe Blanchard
  - Lou Albano
  - Mario Milano
  - Mark Lewin
  - Mitsu Arakawa
  - Pampero Firpo
  - Pepper Gomez
  - Peter Maivia
  - Rod Trongard
  - Stan Stasiak
  - Tojo Yamamoto
- February 28 – Wilbur Snyder
- August 20 – Irma González

== Births ==
- Date of birth uncertain:
  - Joe Lightfoot
- January 24 – Bruce Jones (actor)
- January 25 – The Honky Tonk Man
- February 5 – Takashi Ishikawa
- February 13 – Akio Sato
- February 20 – Terry Gibbs
- February 28 – Ricky Steamboat
- March 5 – Dennis Coralluzzo (died in 2001)
- March 22 – Buffalo Jim Barrier (died in 2008)
- April 3 – Russ Francis (died in 2023)
- April 5 – Salman Hashimikov (died in 2025)
- April 14 – John Ayers (died in 1995)
- April 25 – Carl Fergie
- May 10 – Tito Santana
- May 18 – Tiger Conway Jr.
- June 20 – Flesh Gordon
- June 30 – Hombre Bala(died in 2018)
- July 3 – Steve O
- July 10 -
  - Billy Jack Haynes
  - Zoogz Rift (died in 2011)
- July 11 – Leon Spinks (died in 2021)
- July 20 – Angel of Death(died in 2007)
- August 5 – Stan Lane
- August 11:
  - Hulk Hogan (died in 2025)
  - Franco Columbo
- August 13 – Sue Green
- August 14 – Gran Markus Jr.(died in 2026)
- August 18 – Chief Jay Eagle
- August 22 – Paul Ellering
- August 28 – Joel Goodhart
- September 1 – Rocco Rock(died in 2002)
- September 4 – Kengo Kimura
- September 15 – Adrian Adonis (died in 1988)
- September 29 – Warren Cromartie
- December 13 – Brad Rheingans
- December 14 – Fuerza Guerrera
- December 24:
  - Ricky Knight
  - Steve Wright
- December 28 – Tatsumi Fujinami
- December 30 – Bill Kazmaier

== Deaths ==
- May 29 – Man Mountain Dean (61)
- June 13 – Yakov Kozalchik (50)
