= French wrestling =

French wrestling may refer to:

- Professional wrestling in France
- Professional wrestling in Russia in the Greco Roman style at circuses during the Imperial and Soviet Union eras
- Any other Greco Roman wrestling in Soviet-era Russia including amateur, Olympic and other legitimate sport wrestling.
