= WWF World Martial Arts Heavyweight Championship =

Professional wrestling championship

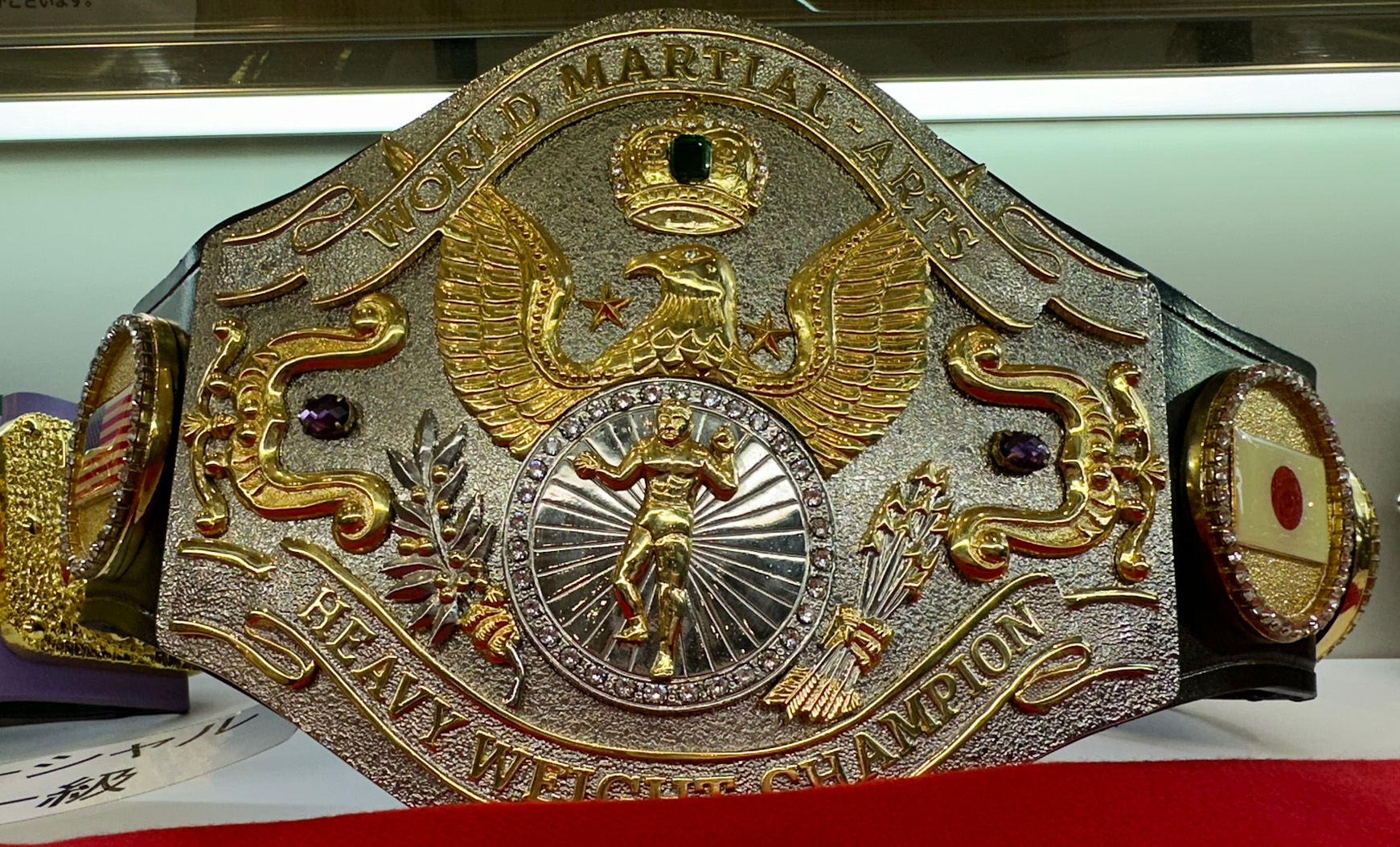

Details
- Promotion: World Wide Wrestling Federation / World Wrestling Federation (WWWF / WWF); New Japan Pro-Wrestling (NJPW)
- Date established: December 18, 1978
- Date retired: December 31, 1989

Other names
- WWWF World Martial Arts Heavyweight Championship (1978–1979); WWF World Martial Arts Heavyweight Championship (1979–1989)
Statistics
- First champion: Antonio Inoki
- Final champion: Antonio Inoki
- Most reigns: Antonio Inoki (2 reigns)
- Longest reign: Antonio Inoki (1st reign, 3,780 days)
- Shortest reign: Shota Chochishvili (31 days)
- Oldest champion: Shota Chochishvili (38 years, 289 days)
- Youngest champion: Antonio Inoki (35 years, 302 days)
- Heaviest champion: Shota Chochishvili (243lb (110kg))
- Lightest champion: Antonio Inoki (224lb (102kg))

The WWF World Martial Arts Heavyweight Championship was a professional wrestling heavyweight championship in the World Wrestling Federation (WWF) and later in New Japan Pro-Wrestling (NJPW). It was created on December 18, 1978, and awarded to NJPW mainstay Antonio Inoki by Vincent J. McMahon, upon Inoki's arrival in America. The championship served largely as a vanity championship for Inoki similar to Ted DiBiase's Million Dollar Championship and Hook's FTW Championship. The WWF World Martial Arts Heavyweight Championship was contested solely in NJPW after the promotion became unaffiliated with the WWF in 1985.

== History ==
The WWWF World Martial Arts Heavyweight Championship was first established on December 18, 1978, during a World Wide Wrestling Federation (WWWF) house show in New York, New York. At the event, WWWF promoter Vincent J. McMahon awarded the championship to New Japan Pro-Wrestling (NJPW) promoter Antonio Inoki for Inoki's achievements against fighters from other combat sports, including his fight against Dutch judoka Willem Ruska and his 1976 fight against world champion boxer Muhammad Ali. Inoki made his first defense of the Martial Arts Championship on the December 18 house show, defeating Texas Red. Inoki would continue to defend the championship against both professional wrestlers, like Larry Sharpe during Showdown at Shea, and martial artists like karateka Willie Williams. In 1979, the WWWF was renamed the World Wrestling Federation (WWF), with the championship adopting the new initials and becoming known as the WWF World Martial Arts Heavyweight Championship. The championship was defended sporadically in its 11-year history before being retired on December 31, 1989, during NJPW's inaugural event in the Soviet Union.

During the thirtieth anniversary of Inoki's career, NJPW created the "Greatest 18 Club", a hall of fame. NJPW then created a new title, the Greatest 18 Club Championship, which was intended to complement the IWGP Heavyweight Championship. The Greatest 18 Championship was represented by the former Martial Arts Championship belt and was awarded to Riki Choshu in 1990. Choshu lost the title to The Great Muta in 1992. Muta retired the title on September 23 of that year, in order to focus on his IWGP Heavyweight Championship title defenses. The title was subsequently officially retired by NJPW.

Inoki awarded the WWWF World Martial Arts Heavyweight Championship belt to Mark Coleman on March 25, 2001, for his victory over Allan Goes at the Pride 13 mixed martial arts event.

== Reigns ==
Over the championship's 11-year history, there were only two reigns between two champions. Antonio Inoki was the inaugural and last champion. Inoki's first reign was the longest at 3,780, while Shota Chochishvili's reign was the shortest at 31 days. Chochishvili was the oldest champion at 38 years old, while Inoki was the youngest at 35 years old.

Key
No.	Overall reign number
Reign	Reign number for the specific champion
Days	Number of days held

No.	Champion	Championship change			Reign statistics		Notes	Ref.
No.	Champion	Date	Event	Location	Reign	Days	Notes	Ref.
National Wrestling Alliance: World Wide Wrestling Federation (WWWF)
1	Antonio Inoki	December 18, 1978	WWWF house show	New York, NY	1	3,780	Inoki was awarded the championship by Vincent J. McMahon for his achievements in matches against fighters from other combat sports. Inoki makes his first defense of the title at this event against Texas Red.	
World Wrestling Federation (WWF)
2	Shota Chochishvili	April 24, 1989	Battle Satellite in Tokyo Dome	Tokyo, Japan	1	31	This was a no rope martial arts match; Chochishvili won in the fifth round via knockout.	
3	Antonio Inoki	May 25, 1989	Battle Satellite 1989 in Osaka	Osaka, Japan	2	220	This was a no rope martial arts match; Inoki won in the second round via submission.	
—	Deactivated	December 31, 1989	Martial Arts Festival	Moscow, Russia, Soviet Union	—	—	Inoki gives the belt to Soviet judoka Shota Chochishvili, the only man to defeat him for the championship, as a sign of friendship between the Japanese and Soviet peoples during NJPW's inaugural event in the Soviet Union. Inoki was then recognized as the final champion after NJPW abandoned the title on December 31, 1989. The physical belt was later used to represent NJPW's Greatest 18 Club Championship.	

== Combined reigns ==
Rank	Champion	No. of reigns	Combined days
1	Antonio Inoki	2	4,000
2	Shota Chochishvili	1	31
