= Marc Mercier =

French professional wrestler and actor (1958–2026)

- Born: 11 April 1958; Bourg-la-Reine, France
- Died: 7 September 2026 (aged 68)
- Occupations: Wrestler; Actor
- Professional wrestling career
- Billed height: 1.84 m (6 ft 1/2 in)
- Billed weight: 224 kg (494 lb)
- Trained by: Guy Mercier
- Debut: September 1977
- Retired: 30 December 2008

Marc Mercier (French: [mˈaʁk mɛʁsjˈe]; 11 April 1958 – 7 September 2026) was a French professional wrestler and actor. He competed in the Fédération Française de Catch Professionnel (FFCP), achieving the title of World Champion from 1985 to 1989.

== Life and career ==
Born in Bourg-la-Reine on 11 April 1958, Mercier was the son of Guy Mercier, also a wrestler. His uncle, also named Marc Mercier, was a member of the French Resistance who was killed in a German ambush on 14 August 1944. His first professional wrestling match was at the Élysée Montmartre in September 1977. He became French champion in 1979, European champion in 1981, and world champion in 1985, As well as several wrestling matches on French TV, Mercier also wrestled on Britain's ITV in 1988, unsuccessfully challenging Marty Jones for the World Mid Heavyweight Championship.

A fractured ankle during a match in Kyiv in March 1989 forced him into early retirement. He returned to the ring in 2002 with the organization Wrestling Stars before joining the International Catch Wrestling Alliance in 2005. In 2006, he re-created the FFCP, of which he was elected president, and founded the Catch Academy in Wissous. There, he encouraged young wrestlers to avoid dangerous wrestling moves. In 2013, he criticized the Fédération française de lutte et disciplines associées following the International Olympic Committee's decision to drop wrestling from the Olympic Games. On 16 February 2014, he announced his departure from the FFCP, but returned to the role of president after his successor, Artémis Ortygie, left the country.

In addition to his professional wrestling career, Mercier appeared on the screen as an actor and stuntman. He held minor roles in television series such as Cordier and Son: Judge and Cop and Une femme d'honneur before serving as Gérard Depardieu's stunt double in the 1998 film Asterix and Obelix vs. Caesar after the actor had suffered a car accident during the time of filming. He befriended Depardieu and his son, Guillaume.

Mercier died of oesophageal cancer on 7 September 2026, at the age of 68.
