= Professional wrestling in Russia =

Professional wrestling in Russia has been promoted in the country from the late 19th century.

== History ==
=== Russian Empire ===
1892 is considered the year when professional wrestling appeared in Russia, when Polish wrestler Vladislav Pytljasinski came to St. Petersburg. In 1894, the first public contest in French wrestling was held, in the same year wrestling was first allowed in the Ciniselli Сircus. The circus administration considered wrestling to be "dangerous for inciting passions among spectators" and only allowed "demonstration of wrestling techniques" with a time limit of 10 and 20 minutes. Among the amateurs who wrestled Pytljasinski in the circus was A. F. Meo, a local clerk, for whom a performance in the circus could have caused problems in his career, so he performed wearing a mask. European and Turkish wrestlers are invited to perform in Russia. "Professionals" were considered those wrestlers who have no other job and earn solely by performing.

In 1897 Vladislav Kraevsky created the "St. Petersburg Athletic and Cycling Club", which trained professional wrestlers. His pupil was the greatest wrestler of the first wave, Georg Hackenschmidt. In July 1900, Hackenschmidt took part in a forty-day wrestling tournament in Moscow, making his first appearance as a professional in Russia. Wrestling goes for two prizes, he won both, and became champion of Moscow and St. Petersburg.

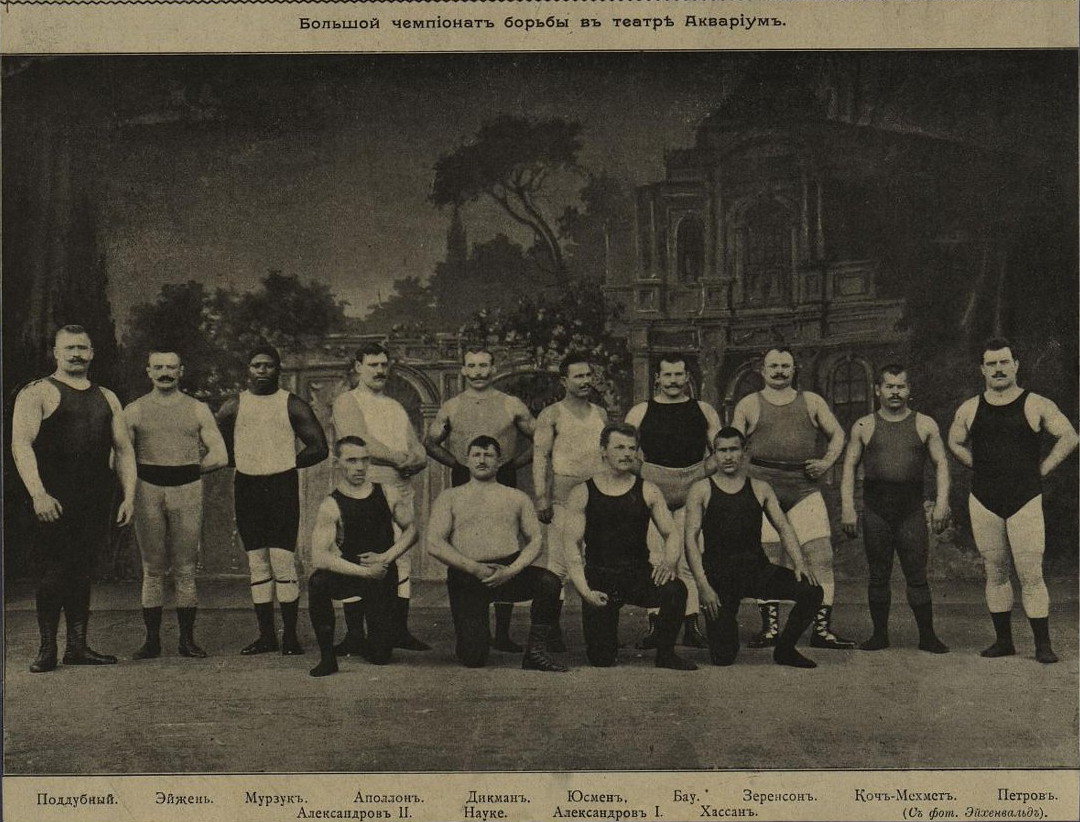
Grand Championship Wrestling at the Aquarium Theater, Moscow. About 1903

Circus wrestling developed in the same time. Wrestling was the highlight of the circus program; championships could last for weeks and months. By 1905, it resembled modern professional wrestling with its rules, customs, and manners. One of the most notable promoters of such shows was "Uncle Vanya" Ivan Lebedev, an associate of Kravesky's, who entertained the audience, announced the wrestlers' entrances and developed a number of characters—Svyatogor, Uncle Pound, Sarakiki, Ivan the Cain, and Abel. It was considered essential for black wrestlers to perform. Georg Lurich once persuaded the wrestler Osipov to paint himself brown and passed him off as the leader of an endangered Native American tribe. Uncle Vanya invented Sarakiki, a Chinese pretending to be Japanese, which was in vogue after Russia's defeat in the war with Japan. There were "beasts"—wrestlers who broke the rules and excited the public with their wild antics. There were "noble beauties", who earned the audience's sympathy with their gentlemanly manners and fairness, and who would inevitably defeat the "beasts" at the end of the championship. Comic wrestlers staged parody fights, there were wrestlers in colorful masks. In the competitions were staged performances, which played on human feelings, capable of touching the heart of the then viewer. To arouse interest resorted to various tricks: started arguments in front of an audience, threatened each other with violence, hid behind the cheek swim bladder with red paint, which then poured faces.

The fight was divided into two types:

- "Shike" was wrestling for the public, the fight was lively and interesting. In it, holds and counter holds followed in succession. Risky and spectacular moves were used, which had no place in competitive wrestling.
- "Bur" was a violent and "sometimes disgusting" spectacle. In "bur" fights the champions found out who was the stronger of the two. It was a fight for prestige, for the right to get a large paycheck.

Ivan Zaikin said: "You can't make a wrestler endure serious 'bur' fights every day. He just can't stand too much tension, and the audience won't enjoy it either". The best wrestlers rarely faced each other, as each defeat sidelined them.

According to Ivan Poddubny's recollections, there was the following hierarchy:

At the highest level of the wrestling hierarchy were "technicals", or, as they were also called, "pirouettes"—wrestlers who had a perfect command of wrestling techniques. Below them stood "loggers". And on the lowest step were wrestlers, who were contemptuously called "padding", those who by order of the director of the championship lost by pinfall.

Circus historian Evgeny Kuznetsov writes: "...circus without championships became equally unthinkable both in the capital and in the provinces, where wrestling, which had completely lost its sporting character, took rude, punishing forms". Count George Ribopierre achieved that wrestling was allowed in the fourth week of Lent, when all other entertainments were closed: he proved that wrestling is not a spectacle, but a sport. Pictures of Poddubny, Hackenschmidt, and Stanislaus Zbyszko sold by the thousands.

On May 4, 1905, Hackenschmidt defeats American Tom Jenkins in New York City and became the first ever recognized world heavyweight wrestling champion. He lost the title, losing to Frank Gotch in Chicago on April 3, 1908. On September 4, 1911, Hackenschmidt failed to take revenge on Gotch and ended his career. Their confrontation is considered a professional wrestling classic . In the 1920s in the United States, like circus wrestling, professional wrestling transformed from a competitive sport into a show whose match results were determined in advance.

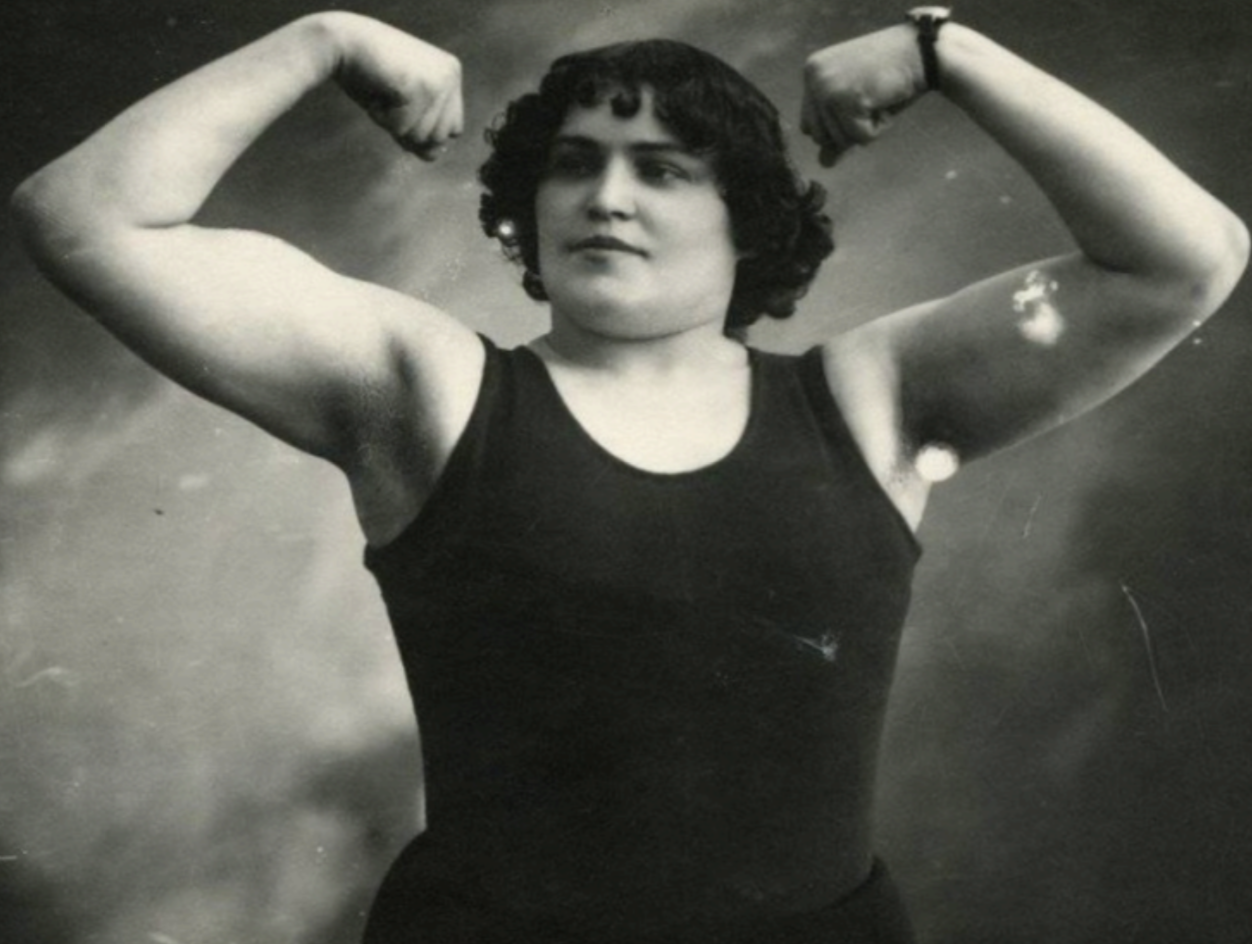
Female wrestler Annette Сelt

Women's wrestling was widespread. One of its representatives was Annette Сelt, wife of Anatoly Durov.

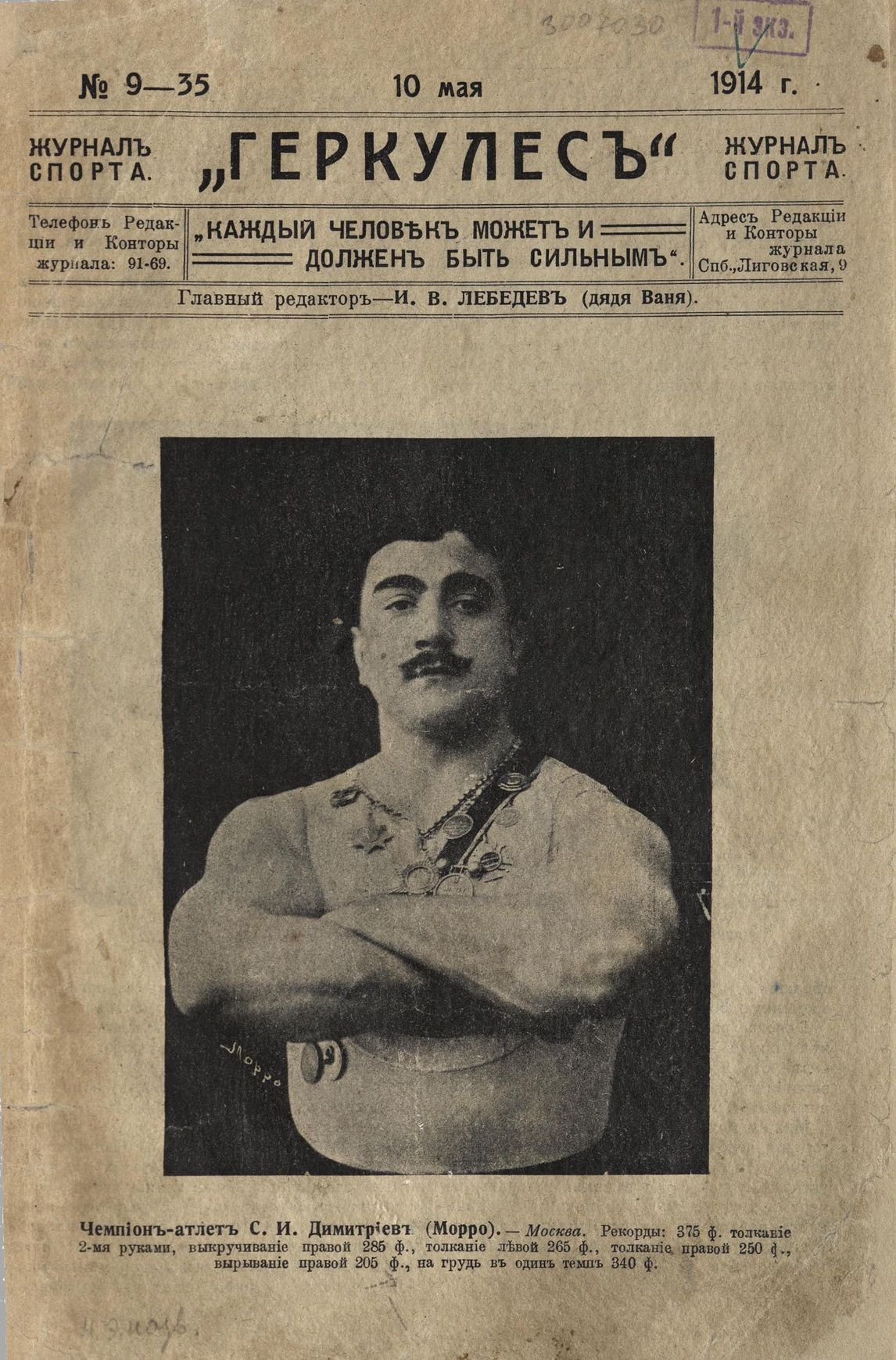
Hercules Magazine, 1914, No. 9-35 (May 10)

In 1912–1917, Uncle Vanya published the magazine Hercules, a magazine about professional wrestling.

=== Soviet Union ===
After the Russian Revolution, professional wrestling caused skepticism in the media, newspapers wrote: "...wild, transferred to our time from the Middle Ages wrestling, the fight of gladiators and boxing - who needs it?". Some of this mirrored the cynicism about professional wrestling in the media of Western nations - in 1936 Pravda published a satire - "Where to go in one's spare time? To a film? A drama? A lecture on Abyssinia? ... To the circus to watch French wrestling, and argue if it's real or not." Wrestling persisted in circus programs until about the beginning of World War II. By the 1980s, Catch-based professional wrestling was flourishing in the United States, Canada, United Kingdom, France, West Germany/Austria, Mexico and Japan, but had yet to exist in the Soviet Union.

In 1989, Japanese wrestling promoter Antonio Inoki and New Japan Pro-Wrestling prepared an agreement with the USSR State Sports Committee, under which several wrestlers went to New Japan Dojo for training, which lasted a month. Two of them, Salman Hasimikov and Viktor Zangiev then competed in NJPW and later, from 1989 to 1994, in UWF-I. They represented the Soviet Union at WCW Starrcade 1990 in a national team tournament called the Pat O'Connor Memorial Cup. On May 25, 1989, in Osaka, Hasimikov defeated Big Van Vader to win IWGP Heavyweight Championship.

In wrestling in Western nations in the mid to late 20th century, there were several wrestlers who played the role of Russians for most of their careers, but they were not Russians. In America, examples included Boris Malenko, Nikolai Volkoff, Ivan Koloff and Nikita Koloff. (Volkoff was played by Serbian-born Josip Peruzović who claimed to be a quarter Russian). In Europe, there was longtime French star Le Grand Vladimir, while Canadian Richard Krupa toured for the British Joint Promotions in 1987 as Red Ivan, teaming with "Comrade" McDonald. The first Soviet-born wrestler in a major US promotion is Vladimir Kozlov, who competed in WWE in the late 2000s. Alex Koslov, also born in the Soviet Union, was popular in the independent circuit. Ilja Dragunov is the first non-kayfabe Russian-born male wrestler to have ever competed in the WWE. In 2021 Leyla Hirsch was the first Russian-born female wrestler had officially signed with All Elite Wrestling.

==== NJPW Martial Arts Festival ====
Thanks to good relations between Inoki and the USSR, the first professional wrestling show in the USSR was held on December 31, 1989, in Moscow at the Luzhniki Palace of Sports with the participation of NJPW. It was called NJPW Martial Arts Festival, and was attended by approximately 15,000 spectators. Athletes from the USSR took part in the show: Viktor Zangiev and Salman Khashimikov, Shota Chochishvili, and others. On the NJPW side, popular wrestlers took part: Antonio Inoki, Junshin Liger, Masahiro Chono, and Bam Bam Bigelow. The show had a total of 9 matches with 20 wrestlers from four different countries: nine wrestlers from Japan, seven from the USSR, three from the US and one from the UK. There is a video recording of some of the matches from this show.

===== Card =====
	Result	Duration
1	Kuniaki Kobayashi defeats Takayuki Iizuka	12:07
2	Jushin Liger defeats Black Tiger	9:32
3	Masahiro Chono defeats Timur Zalasov	10:46
4	Shinya Hashimoto vs. Wahka Eveloev, time limit draw	15:00
5	Riki Choshu defeats Victor Zangiev	6:04
6	Bam Bam Bigelow defeats Vladimir Berkovich	9:30
7	Habieli Victachev defeats Hiroshi Hase	Round 3, 1:11
8	Salman Hashimikov defeats Manny Fernandez	8:20
9	Antonio Inoki & Shota Chochishvili defeat Brad Rheingans & Masa Saito	11:35

=== Russia ===
On August 9–11, 1994, three Frontier Martial-Arts Wrestling (FMW) shows were held at the Lenin Stadium in Khabarovsk, which attracted 600-1100 spectators each. Previously, Russian athletes Svetlana Gundarenko and Grigory Verichev competed in FMW.

In 1998, for the first time in Russia, professional wrestling shows began to be broadcast on national TV channels. A program called Titans of Wrestling appeared on TNT with Nikolai Fomenko as its announcer. Until 2000, the WCW Monday Nitro show was broadcast on it. Then WCW broadcasts were briefly replaced by the Women of Wrestling (WOW!) promotion. From 2000 to 2002, The World Wrestling, a shortened 45-minute international version of WWF/WWE SmackDown! was broadcast on STS, with voice actors Vsevolod Kuznetsov and Alexander Novikov as announcers. In September 2002, wrestling returned to TNT, with the new Titans of Wrestling airing a 45-minute version of WWE Raw. The broadcasts lasted exactly one year, until September 2003. After that, the contract with WWE expired and was never renewed. Since 2012, Eurosport broadcasts only two international programs from WWE—Review of the Week and WWE Vintage Collection.

On November 30, 2010, it was announced that from February 2011, the 2x2 television channel would begin airing WWE Raw and WWE SmackDown.

On April 11, 2012, WWE held its first Raw World Tour house show in Russia at the Luzhniki Palace of Sports. In the main event CM Punk defeated Dolph Ziggler for the WWE Championship. On April 25, 2013, WrestleMania Revenge Tour 2013 hosted the first WWE Raw show in St. Petersburg Ice Palace, and the next day, April 26, the show returned to Moscow at the Luzhniki.

Since April 2016, all new WWE pay-per-view shows have been available on the WWE Network with Russian-language voiceover, with Moti Margolin and Jean Pomerantsev as announcers. After the end of the contract, 2x2 did not renew it with WWE, but switched to Lucha Underground broadcasts. As of April 6, 2019, Lucha Underground is broadcast on 2x2 with commentary by Roman Alexandrovich and Alexander Barybin.

Beginning January 7, 2020, the Match! Fighter channel broadcasts WWE Raw and WWE SmackDown shows in Russian. The announcers are Artem Davydov and a representative of the Independent Wrestling Federation (IWF) Mikhail Vakhneev. The channel announces that Raw and SmackDown live from the U.S. begins at 03:55 am Moscow time. Replays of the show are shown throughout the week.

As of March 3, 2022, WWE terminated its broadcast partnership with the Match TV station and removed access to WWE network and all related products for Russian audiences.

== Promotions ==
=== Independent Wrestling Federation (2002–present) ===
In November 2002, the Independent Wrestling Federation (IWF) held its first show in Moscow. The first two shows were The Physical Punishment Zone and Judgment Day. Since 2003, Danger Zone shows have been held monthly in Moscow and the Moscow region. Once a year the shows President's Cup, King of Hardcore, and Wrestliada began to take place. The IWF also gives showcases, and wrestlers participate in various festivals. In 2006, one of the IWF shows was attended by Shane McMahon, who was in Russia to negotiate the return of WWE to Russian television. At various times, professional wrestlers such as El Generico, Sonjay Dutt, Zema Ion and Matt Cross have appeared at IWF. From 2005 to 2010, IWF shows were broadcast on 7TV and Russian Extreme. IWF has its own school. As of February 2018, the IWF has hosted over 100 shows.

=== Northern Storm Wrestling (2014–present) ===
In 2014, Northern Storm Wrestling (NSW) was established in St. Petersburg. In 2015, the promotion's wrestlers performed at Comic-Con Russia. NSW hosts a monthly Northern Storm show. On September 20, 2015, the company's first major show, Battle on the Neva, was held at the Leningrad Palace of Youth, featuring former WWE superstar and two-time NWA World Heavyweight Champion Colt Cabana. In September 2015, NSW became part of the Union of European Wrestling Alliances. In November 2016, NSW wrestlers participated in the IWF Danger Zone 100 anniversary show.
