= Crusher Verdu =

Spanish professional wrestler (1940–2004)

Personal information
- Born: Oscar Verdu; October 21, 1940 Barcelona, Spain
- Died: January 2004 (aged 63)

Professional wrestling career
- Ring name(s): Crusher Verdu; Killer Verdu; Spanish Hercules; Oscar Verdu; Rick Ferraro; Der Henker
- Billed height: 5"10
- Billed weight: 330 lb (150 kg)
- Billed from: Columbus, Ohio
- Debut: 1955
- Retired: 1983

Oscar Verdu (October 21, 1940 – January 2004) was a Spanish professional wrestler known by his ring name Crusher Verdu. He competed in Spanish, various European and North American wrestling promotions including the World Wide Wrestling Federation, National Wrestling Federation and NWA Hollywood.

== Professional wrestling career ==
Verdu began his professional wrestling debut in 1955 in Spain. In 1958, he debuted in North America in New York City. He worked for NWA Upstate in Cleveland and Buffalo throughout the early 1960s. Then in 1964, he made his debut in the United Kingdom for Joint Promotions and stayed there for a few years. In 1968, he returned to North America and worked for Big Time Wrestling in Detroit.

In 1970, Verdu wrestled for the World Wide Wrestling Federation being managed by Lou Albano. He feuded with WWWF Champion Bruno Sammartino. On June 15 he defeated Sammartino by referee's decision but did not win the title. He also defeated Gorilla Monsoon. His in-ring capabilities were hampered by a limited command of English, and Albano was assigned to be his mouthpiece. Albano emphasized Verdu's physique and insisted that he had never been taken off his feet during a match. To rile up audiences, he also engaged in ethnic slurs, which were then a more common part of WWWF banter; Albano promised that Verdu would stomp on "that Italian" (Sammartino); the fact that Albano was known to be Italian himself only heightened the audience's reaction. Sammartino later said, "They wanted to see me beat the hell out of Verdu to make Albano a liar. He could get the kind of heat that nobody else could." The result was a Madison Square Garden sellout when Verdu faced Sammartino in June 1970, the first for the company in five years and a then-record gate for a wrestling event in that arena. The record lasted only a month, when a rematch brought in over $85,000 in ticket receipts. After losing that match, Verdu cycled out of the WWWF rotation, but Albano remained as the top heel manager for the next 15 years.

After WWWF, Verdu returned to Cleveland this time working for National Wrestling Federation in 1971. He wrestled in France for the FFCP as the masked Der Henker ("the Hangman") from Germany, appearing on multiple occasions on France's national TV wrestling. In 1974, he worked in Georgia for the All-Star Wrestling Alliance. Then in 1975 worked for Central States Wrestling.

In 1976, Verdu won the NWA Americas Heavyweight Championship defeating Gory Guerrero in Los Angeles. A month later he dropped the title to Guerrero's son Chavo.

In 1977, he made his debut in Indianapolis for World Wrestling Association as Killer Verdu.

In 1983, Verdu returned to the FFCP in France, once more as the masked Der Henker, where he held the French Heavyweight Championship around October that year, before he retired from professional wrestling in Germany where he resided.

== Death ==
Verdu died in January 2004 in Germany.

== Championships and accomplishments ==
- Fédération Française de Catch Professionnel
  - French Heavyweight Championship (1 time)
- NWA Hollywood Wrestling
  - NWA Americas Heavyweight Championship (1 time)
  - NWA Americas Tag Team Championship (5 times) – with Roddy Piper (1), and Frank Monte (1)
