= Professional wrestling in France =

A professional wrestling match between 'Killer' Leteur vs 'Hairy' Hessle in Paris, France in 1948

Professional wrestling in France dates back to the 1830s and exhibitions of Greco Roman wrestling in circuses. In the 1930s French wrestling moved from Greco Roman to Catch wrestling. Between the early 1950s and late 1980s France was one of two European countries, along with the United Kingdom, to have regular national television coverage of professional wrestling. As with British Wrestling on ITV, French TV likewise made household names of wrestling stars like L'Ange Blanc, Le Bourreau de Bethune Chéri Bibi, Robert Duranton, Le Petit Prince and Flesh Gordon. Some French wrestlers, notably André the Giant and Edouard Carpentier, went on to successful American wrestling careers. By the mid-1980s, the WWF had invaded France and soon eclipsed local wrestling in popular culture. In the 21st century, wrestling companies in France are split between the surviving traditional French promotions and those more styled after American independent wrestling.

== Terminology ==
In France since the 1930s, professional wrestling has been known as "Catch" (from catch wrestling) and practitioners are known as "catcheurs", as distinct from "lutte", which generally refers to legitimate sport wrestling ("lutte" refers to professional wrestling in some other Francophone territories, including Canadian wrestling).

Many other professional wrestling terms used in French "Catch" differ radically from those used in Canadian promotions which present in Quebec French. For example tag team wrestling which is called "combat par équipe" in Quebec is called "Catch á Quatre" in France. Similarly, the falls of a Best of three falls match are called "Chutes" in Quebec and "Manches" in France.

== History ==
=== 1830s–1930s: Professional Greco-Roman wrestling ===
Exhibitions of Greco Roman wrestling at circuses in France date back to the 1830s. According to United World Wrestling, a Napoleonic soldier named Jean Exbrayat first developed the Greco Roman style of wrestling. Exbrayat performed in fairs and called his style of wrestling "flat hand wrestling" to distinguish it from other forms of hand-to-hand combat that allowed striking. In 1848 he established the rule that no holds below the waist were to be allowed; neither were painful holds or torsions that would hurt the opponent. Professional Greco Roman developed all throughout Europe and became a popular sport, even spreading to America with champion William Muldoon (who had served in the Franco-Prussian War where he had learned the sport). Professional wrestling in Russia continued in the Greco Roman styled, circus-based format into the Soviet era and was generally advertised as "French Wrestling".

=== 1930s: Birth of French Catch ===
In 1933, Raoul Paoli, a French rugby player and all-round athlete, helped his friend Henri Deglane, a Greco-Roman wrestling gold medalist at the 1924 Summer Olympics, to popularize wrestling in France. In 1933 the two men co-founded the Fédération Française de Catch Professionnel (FFCP). The style of wrestling which was promoted by the FFCP was a flashy American style known as "Catch" as it was based on catch wrestling. "Catch" has since become the standard term for professional wrestling across most of the non-English speaking mainland of Europe.

With their friends Charles Rigoulot and Julien Duvivier, both top athletes, they introduced wrestling at the Velodrome d'Hiver in Paris. They became affiliated with the Fédération Française de Lutte (FFL), effectively becoming the professional branch of wrestling within the organization at that time. That same year, a French troupe of wrestlers performed in Madrid, Spain, and introduced modern American-style professional wrestling to Spanish audiences for the first time. Five months later, the FFCP held the earliest-known catch-as-catch-can professional wrestling show in Barcelona on October 25, 1933, headlined by Henri Deglane and Sailor Arnold.

=== 1950s–1980s: Wrestling on French television ===
From the 1950s until the 1970s, live wrestling shows were commonplace in France, notably at the Cirque d'Hiver in Paris, at fairs or on the occasion of special galas such as on Bastille Day. From 1952, French television regularly screened wrestling highlights as part of news broadcasts with standalone full length wrestling match broadcasts following in 1956. Roger Couderc, Georges de Caunes, Claude Darget (who was briefly sacked for flouting kayfabe on air in 1959, resulting in industrial action by supportive colleagues) and Thierry Roland generally provided commentary for televised matches. In the late 1970s and through most of the 1980s, Daniel Cazal provided commentary.

Although popular television, the sport's worked nature and working class appeal attracted hostility from such luminaries as sports minister Maurice Herzog who lobbied for cancellation of "vulgar" wrestling and RTF assistant director general Raymond Janot who attempted to pull wrestling from the schedules in April 1961 only for a public backlash to force him to relent. At various times 1955-1970, neighbouring French language TV stations Télévision Suisse Romande, Télé Monte Carlo, Telesaar and Radio-Television Luxembourg also broadcast wrestling from France.

When RTF Channel 2 was launched in 1964, wrestling coverage was increasingly migrated to the new channel, with matches on Channel 2 transmitted in colour once the channel's colour service began in October 1967. At least one bout from this early period, a January 1969 match pitting Roger Delaporte and regular partner Andre Bollet against Marcel Montreal and Warnia de Zarzecki survives on colour videotape at France's INA; other late 1960s/early 1970s bouts originally screened in colour survive only on monochrome kinescope film prints.

Top stars of French wrestling at the time included l'Ange Blanc, Jean Ferre (the future André the Giant), "Le Tigre de la Lutte", Le Bourreau de Béthune (Jacques Ducrez), Le Petit Prince (Daniel Dubail), Jean Corne, the masked Zarak (British wrestler Dave Larsen), Claude Roca, André Drapp known as "the Lion of Lorraine", Abdesslam El Alami, Robert Duranton, Chéri Bibi and Delaporte, who also bought out the FFCP from Paoli in 1960, becoming the dominant promoter in France. Édouard Carpentier began his wrestling career in Paris (as "Eddy Wiechoski") before moving to Canada in 1956. Film star Lino Ventura was a star wrestler (as "Lino Borrini") before becoming an actor.

During the 1960s, wrestling had a weekly residence at seven Parisian venues: the Élysée Montmartre (also a top music venue), the Salle Wagram, the Stadium, the Palais des Sports de Paris, La Mutualité, the Cirque d'hiver and the Vel d'Hiv. During the 1970s, Roger Delaporte would reinvent himself from notorious villain to hard-nosed referee. He also owned the Élysée Montmartre until he sold it in 1988 to the production company Garance Productions. retiring from promotion the following year.

In the 1980s, wrestling in France moved to a more acrobatic style of action and colourful gimmick-led presentation, as exemplified by lead babyface Flesh Gordon (Gerard Hervé) who had learned his craft in 1970s Mexico. In 1982 the FR3 network of regional stations began screening some wrestling matches. In 1984, it broadcast the series La Dernière Manchette ("The Last Forearn Smash") featuring vintage footage, new bouts and mock crowd scene sketches. The following year, in August 1985, the main wrestling coverage migrated from Channel 2 (by then known as Antenne 2) to FR3 where it would remain until November 1987, usually as part of the Sports Loisirs sports anthology show, with at least one further match broadcast on the network in February 1991.

In late 1988, a first run of episodes of the New Catch wrestling programme was screened on TF1, the former Channel 1, as part of another sports package show Minuit Sport. This was filmed mostly in France and heavily used local stars already long established on previous television such as Gordon/Hervé, Jacky Richard (as "Le Marquis" - he would later become "Travesti Man"), Prince Zéfy and Angelito, alongside CWA and British talent. The series was bookended on TF1 by a run of AWA shows in Summer 1988 and a similar run of World Class episodes in early 1989. A repeat of the 1988 first season of New Catch episodes and the premiére of a new second season were shown on Eurosport in 1991-1992 after TF1 replaced BSkyB as co-owner of the channel. Four second run episodes were screened on TF1 in late 1991. Later in the 1990s and into the 21st century, many French wrestlers such as Gordon, Richard (as "Monsieur Jacky"), Zéfy and Scott Rider worked for Belgian promotion Eurostars, run by wrestler Bernard Van Damme, which produced a TV show and held live TV tapings as far afield as Switzerland and FYR Macedonia.

=== 1980s–1990s: WWF invasion ===
Privately owned, subscription-only Canal + was launched in 1984 and carried WWF programming from an early stage. The first live WWF show in France, indeed in all Europe, took place October 23, 1987 at Bercy Stadium headlined by a match with Andre as special referee between Junkyard Dog and Harley Race. The following year 1988, a show on October 7 filmed at the same venue as part of a French/Italian tour and screened in the United States on WWF Wrestling Challenge on November 8 (with hosts Gorilla Monsoon and Bobby Heenan purporting to be live at the Arena) saw Rockin Robin win the WWF Women's Championship from Sensational Sherri as well as WWF champion Randy Savage and tag team champions Demolition defend their titles against Akeem and the British Bulldogs respectively.

A third show at the Arena on October 13, 1989, once again as part of a European Tour following on from the WWF's debut U.K shows 2–3 days earlier, was headlined by a rematch of the Wrestlemania V main event pitting champion Hulk Hogan against former champion Savage. This would be followed by a week-long national tour with shows in Clermont, Grenoble, Lyon, Marseille and Toulouse. The WWF continued to visit France sporadically through the early 1990s - an October 9, 1991 show at Palais Omnisports was headlined by a battle royal won by Davey Boy Smith, a return to the Bercy Stadium on April 8, 1993, saw Yokozuna, between World title reigns, defeat Hacksaw Duggan while on August 5 that year in Toulon, he kept his by-then regained World title by losing by disqualification to Hulk Hogan, in the penultimate appearance of Hogan's 1983–1993 WWF run. This would be the promotion's last French show for 14 years until 2007.

=== Modern era ===
The FFCP remained defunct for seventeen years after Delaporte's retirement. until being revived by second generation wrestler Marc Mercier, the son of wrestler Guy Mercier, in 2006 under the supervision of the elderly Delaporte until his death in 2009. In its absence, Hervé and fellow professional wrestler, veteran heel Jacky Richard, had established their own company International Wrestling Stars Federation (IWSF), later renamed Wrestling Stars in 2012, as the dominant promotion in the country. The IWSF had evolved out of Hervé's earlier KMG promotion he had co-founded in 1979 with partners Evelyne Kaluza and the brothers Moïse and Marc Mehnaoui. WS's promoters both continued to wrestle with Hervé still as a stouter, shaven-headed moustachioed Flesh Gordon and Richard still as "Monsieur Jacky" in shirt and braces, respectively as lead babyface and lead heel of the company until the early 2010s, when they both retired from the ring, confining themselves to officialdom roles. Mercier retired from the FFCP presidency, aged 65, in February 2024 after 49 years in the wrestling industry. He died 7 September 2026.

Relations between the big two traditional promotions are exceptionally poor – even by standards of inter-promotional rivalries in the wrestling business globally – with each accusing the other of being fraudulent and refusing to speak to journalists who interview the other side. Mercier has accused WS of price dumping their product on venues and TV stations, while Richard has accused Mercier – and his father before him during the latter's 1968–1976 campaign for wrestlers to be eligible for "Intermittent du spectacle" status under French law and thus payment even when not hired – of seeking to stamp out competing promoters by driving up employer costs across the industry.

As elsewhere in Europe, "American-style" promotions such as the International Catch Wrestling Alliance (ICWA) have sprung up providing a product more consistent with modern American independent wrestling and aiming to supplant the old school European style in France.

WWE (formerly WWF) returned to France in 2007. Backlash (2024) was held in Lyon on May 4, 2024. Clash in Paris was held in Nanterre on August 31, 2025.

== Cultural influence ==
Roland Barthes' compilation of essays Mythologies (published in 1957) included Le Catch, a dissection of professional wrestling. Barthes examined wrestling as a form of proletarian morality play and examined differences between the French and American styles of professional wrestling.

Several French language pop music records were produced by wrestlers and other related personnel such as Le Catch by commentator Couderc and Le Monde est Méchant ("The World is Wicked", idiomatically "Everyone's a Heel") by the tag team of Delaporte and Bollet. The latter duo also acted together in the Spaghetti Western movie Left Handed Johnny West.

== See also ==
- France section on French Wikipedia article "Catch"
