= Bruce Swayze =

Canadian professional wrestler (1940–2026)

Personal information
- Born: April 7, 1940 Kirkland Lake, Ontario, Canada
- Died: September 18, 2026 (aged 86)

Professional wrestling career
- Ring name(s): Bruce Swayze; Black Baron; Beautiful Bruce; Jack Swayze; Jack Ross; Bruce Heffernan
- Billed height: 5 ft 10 in (1.78 m)
- Billed weight: 235 lb (107 kg; 16.8 st)
- Billed from: Sarasota, Florida
- Trained by: Jack Wentworth
- Debut: 1958
- Retired: 1978

Bruce Swayze (April 7, 1940 – September 18, 2026) was a Canadian professional wrestler and manager who spent his career in Cleveland, Ontario, Florida, Carolinas, Calgary and Memphis. He was also known as The Black Baron when he was a manager in the 1970s.

== Biography ==
Swayze made his debut in wrestling in 1958. Swayze formerly played hockey. It wasn't until 1970 that he had his first match in Cleveland for National Wrestling Federation.

He was also known as Black Baron where he managed Abdullah the Butcher, the Love Brothers, Crusher Verdu, and the Samoans.

Swayze died on September 18, 2026, at the age of 86. He was not related to Patrick Swayze.

== Sources ==
- Oliver, Greg (2003). "Roll Call: Hangman Neil Guay". The Pro Wrestling Hall of Fame: The Canadians. ECW Press. p. 176. ISBN 1-55022-531-6.
- Nevada, Vance (2022). (Un)Controlled Chaos: Canada's Remarkable Professional Wrestling Legacy. FriesenPress. ISBN 9781039154797.
