= Bullwhip Johnson =

Canadian wrestler

Personal information
- Born: Daniel R. Johnston; January 6, 1954 Hamilton, Ontario, Canada
- Died: July 20, 2003 (aged 49)

Professional wrestling career
- Ring name(s): Bullwhip Johnson; Bull Johnson; Battleship Johnson; Danny Johnson; Danny Sharp
- Billed height: 6"5
- Billed weight: 286 lb (130 kg)
- Billed from: Toronto
- Trained by: Bull Johnson
- Debut: 1974
- Retired: 1990s

Daniel Johnston (1954–2003) was a Canadian professional wrestler. He wrestled under the ring name, Bull Johnson, Bullwhip Johnson or Battleship Johnson where he spent his career in the National Wrestling Alliance, Lutte International in Montreal and World Championship Wrestling.

== Professional wrestling career ==
His father Ron Bull Johnson trained him and made his wrestling debut in 1974 in Stoney Creek, Ontario. He worked in Buffalo, New York for Pedro Martinez's National Wrestling Federation in 1975.

In 1978, Johnson appeared in the wrestling film Blood & Guts. The movie was filmed in Hamilton.

In 1980, he won the NWA "Beat the Champ" Television Championship in Los Angeles defeating Butcher Brannigan after winning a tournament. He also teamed with former football player Walter Johnson winning the Tag Team title Los Angeles version.

In 1982, Johnson made his debut in Montreal for Lutte International. He worked there until 1986. From 1986 to 1987 he worked for Jim Crockett Promotions in the Mid-Atlantic.

Johnson appeared at World Championship Wrestling's Starrcade '90: Collision Course teaming with Canadian Troy Montour losing to Russians Victor Zangiev and Salman Hashimikov in the quarterfinals at the Pat O'Connor (wrestler) Memorial International Cup Tag Team Tournament. In a reader's poll in the January 8, 1991 edition of the Wrestling Observer Newsletter, 234 out of 447 fans that responded gave the show a thumbs up. 176 gave it a thumbs down, with the remaining 37 giving it a thumbs in the middle reaction. The match between the teams of Hasimikov and Zangiev and Johnson and Montour received the most votes for the worst match of the night with 116.

Johnson worked in the World Wrestling Federation in 1991. Later in his career, Johnson worked in the independents in Ontario.

He retired from wrestling sometime in the 1990s. Johnson would promote wrestling in Hamilton at a Kiwanis club.

== Personal life ==
Johnson died on July 20, 2003, at 49 from liver cirrhosis due to years of alcoholism.

His father, Bull Johnson, was a wrestler who wrestled in the World Wide Wrestling Federation, Toronto, Calgary, the United States and Japan from the 1960s to 1980s. Died in 1988. His brother, Randy also wrestled and teamed with Johnson. Randy died on October 13, 2023, at 67.

His son, Eric is also a wrestler and a comedian. Eric and Canadian authors Greg Oliver and Joseph Casciaro did a book called Run with the Bull: Three Generations of Sports & Entertainment covering Johnson, his dad and his grandpa, Bull Johnson. The book was released on February 1, 2024. On March 16, 2024, a launch party in Toronto was a meet and greet for the book.

== Championships and accomplishments ==
- NWA Hollywood Wrestling
  - NWA Americas Tag Team Championship (1 time) – with Walter Johnson
  - NWA World Tag Team Championship (Los Angeles Version) (1 time) – with Walter Johnson
  - NWA "Beat the Champ" Television Championship (1 time)
