= Victor Zangiev =

Soviet and Russian freestyle wrestler

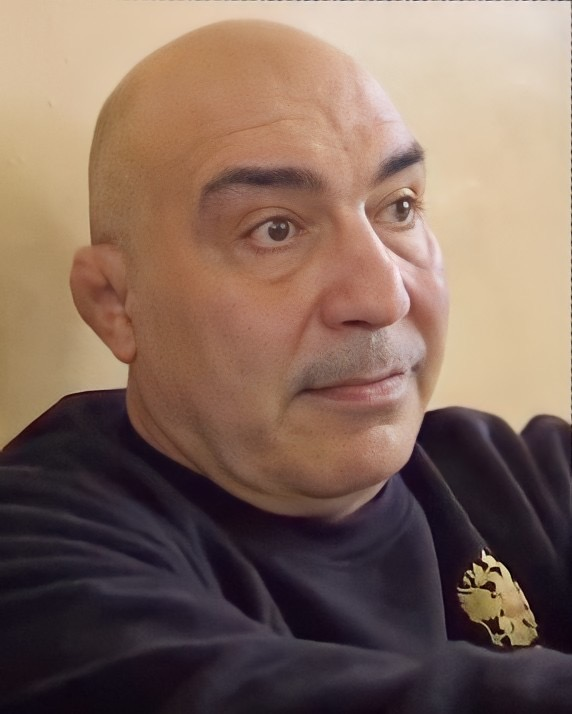
- Born: Victor Dzantemirovich Zangiev; 26 May 1962 (age 64); Kazakh SSR, Soviet Union
- Height: 6 ft 2 in (1.88 m)
- Weight: 247 lb (112 kg)
Medal record
Representing the Soviet Union
Men's freestyle wrestling
World Cup
Silver medal – second place	1985 Toledo	+100 kg
Junior World Championships
Gold medal – first place	1981 Vancouver	+100 kg
Junior European Championships
Gold medal – first place	1982 Leipzig	+100 kg
- Professional wrestling career
- Billed from: Tbilisi, Georgian SSR, U.S.S.R.
- Trained by: Antonio Inoki; NJPW Dojo
- Debut: February 22, 1989
- Retired: 1994

Victor Dzantemirovich Zangiev (Russian: Виктор Дзантемирович Зангиев, Iron Ossetic: Зæнджиаты Дзантемиры фырт Виктор; born 26 May 1962) is a retired Soviet and Russian freestyle wrestler of Ossetian origin, who wrestled professionally in Japan, where he became the cultural inspiration for the Zangief character of the Street Fighter series.

== Amateur wrestling career ==
Victor Zangiev was an amateur wrestler from the Soviet Union. In 1981, he reversed the first seat in the 100 kg class for the Junior World Championships in freestyle wrestling. In 1985, he won two major amateur wrestling titles, the U.S.-Soviet Cup Championships and the World Cup Championships. In 1988, Zangiev won the Soviet Championships.

After retirement, worked as a children's freestyle wrestling coach in Aleksin, Tula Region. As of 2022, he coaches children in Vladikavkaz.

== Professional wrestling career ==
=== New Japan Pro-Wrestling (1989–1990) ===
In 1989, Zangiev, along with several other amateurs, were invited by Antonio Inoki to train in his dojo and wrestle professionally in his promotion, New Japan Pro-Wrestling. Debuting on 22 February at Sumo Hall, Zangiev wrestled two exhibition matches, first against Salman Hashimikov (which ended in a time-limit draw), then against Osamu Matsuda, whom he defeated. In April 1989, he participated in a tournament to determine the new IWGP Heavyweight Champion at New Japan's first show at the Tokyo Dome; he defeated Buzz Sawyer in the quarterfinals, but lost to Shinya Hashimoto in the semifinals. Zangiev would continue wrestling in the mid-card, before leaving at the tail end of 1990.

=== World Championship Wrestling (1990) ===
Before their departure, he and Hashimikov were chosen to represent the Soviet Union for the Pat O'Connor International Tag Team Tournament at Starrcade '90: Collision Course for World Championship Wrestling; they defeated the Canadian team of Danny Johnson and Troy Montour in the quarterfinals, but lost to Masa Saito and The Great Muta in the semifinals.

=== UWF International (1994) ===
In April 1994, Zangiev returned to Japan, this time with the shoot-style UWF International. Like in NJPW, he didn't compete for championships; instead, he mainly wrestled in mid-card single and tag team matches. In October 1994, he left UWFi and retired from professional wrestling.

=== Independent Wrestling Federation (2022) ===
On November 20, Zangiev was a guest on the Independent Wrestling Federation's "20 Years of Pro-Wrestling in Russia" anniversary show. Zangiev interfered in the main event of the show and held Ronnie Crimson a belly-to-belly suplex and then locked him in a knee backbreaker lock.

== Other media ==
In 2022 Victor Zangiev starred in the music video of Miyagi & Endshpil for the song "Silhouette", filmed in the mountains of Ossetia.

== Championships and accomplishments ==
- Pro Wrestling Illustrated
  - PWI ranked him #71 of the best 500 singles wrestlers in the PWI 500 in 1991
