= Raoul Paoli =

French actor, rugby union footballer and sportsman

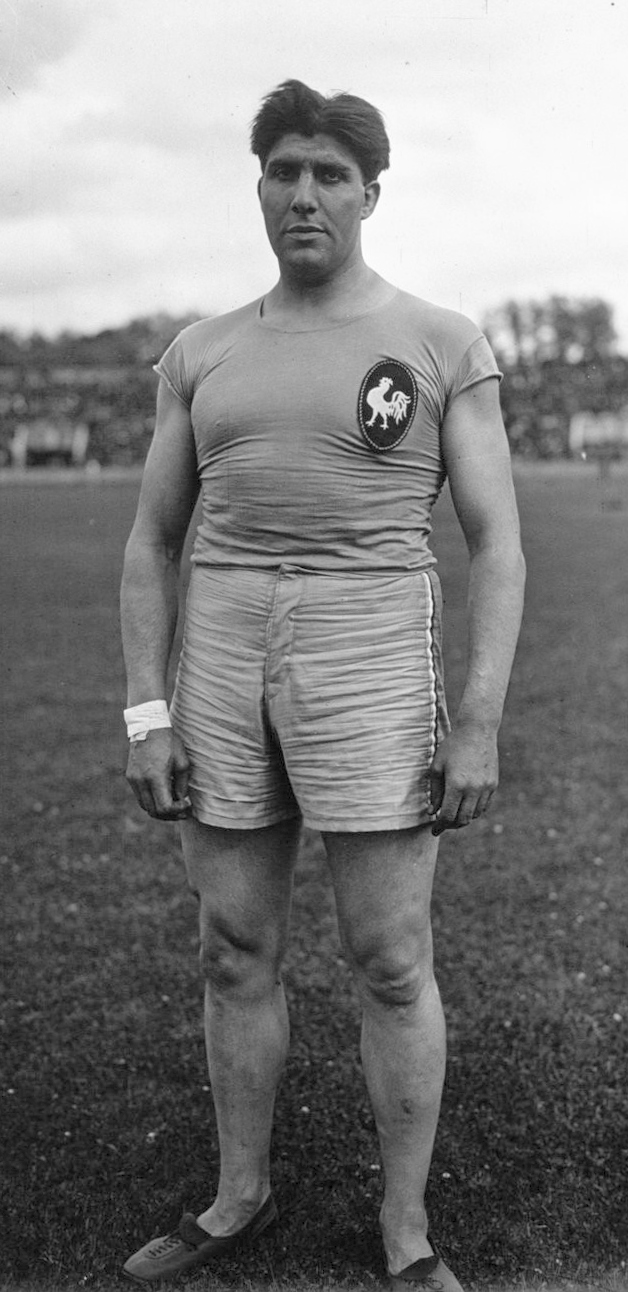
- Paoli in 1923

Personal information
- Full name: Jacques Marie Lucien Raoul Simonpaoli
- Born: 24 November 1887 Courtalain, France
- Died: 23 March 1960 (aged 72) Paris, France
- Height: 186 cm (6 ft 1 in)
- Weight: 125 kg (276 lb)

Sport
- Sport: Athletics, wrestling
- Events: Shot put, discus throw
- Club: Métropolitain Club Colombes; Stade français, Paris; Olympique de Paris, Paris

Achievements and titles
- Personal bests: SP – 14.69 m (1926); DT – 39.90 (1917)
Medal record
Representing France
Olympic Games
Bronze medal – third place	1900 Paris	Coxed pair

Jacques Marie Lucien Raoul Simonpaoli (24 November 1887 – 23 March 1960) was a French athlete, boxer, wrestler, rower and actor. Aged 12, he served as a coxswain in the French coxed pair and won a bronze medal at the 1900 Summer Olympics. He competed in the shot put at the 1912, 1920, 1924 and 1928 Summer Olympics with the best result of ninth place in 1924. In 1912 he also took part in the Greco-Roman wrestling contest and served as the Olympic flag bearer for France, and in 1928 he finished 29th in the discus throw.

Paoli was a French champion in boxing and rugby, with Stade Français. He played three international rugby games for the French national rugby union team in 1911–12 and scored one try. In the 1920s he was romantically involved with the fellow athlete Violette Morris. In 1933 he co-founded the French Federation of Professional Wrestling.

Paoli won the British AAA Championships title in the shot put event at the 1920 AAA Championships and finished second behind Bertil Jansson in the same event at the 1921 AAA Championships.

On Nov. 14, 2025, wrestling journalist Dave Meltzer inducted Paoli into the Wrestling Observer Newsletter Hall of Fame.

== Partial filmography ==
- La Souriante Madame Beudet (1922)
- Possession (1922)
- Terror (1924)
- Madame Sans-Gêne (1925)
- Nitchevo (1926)
- Senorita (1927)
- The Coward (1927)
- The Magic Flame (1927)
- Beau Sabreur (1928)
- Woman Wise (1928)
- The Olympic Hero (1928)
- A Night of Mystery (1928)
- Safety in Numbers (1930)
- The Big Trail (1931)
- Pardon Us (1931) Lost French-Language Version

== Awards and accomplishments ==
- Wrestling Observer Newsletter
  - Wrestling Observer Newsletter Hall of Fame (Class of 2025)
