= Yakov Kozalchik =

Polish-Israeli professional wrestler (1902 – 1953)

Personal information
- Born: 13 July 1902 Krynica-Zdrój, Poland
- Died: 13 June 1953 Holon, Israel

Professional wrestling career
- Ring name(s): Yakov Kozalchik; Samson Eisen; Shimshon Eisen
- Debut: 1920
- Retired: 1949

Yakov Kozalchik (Hebrew: יעקב קוזלצ'יק; 1902 – 13 June 1953) was a known Polish-Israeli strongman and professional wrestler. Kozalchik was the head of the Jewish police in the town of Krynica-Zdrój, a Kapo in the Auschwitz concentration camp, Auschwitz nickname 'Bunker-Jakob'.

== Biography ==
Kozalchik was born in Krynica, near Nowy Sacz to a family of tanners. At an early age he stood out thanks to his tremendous strength and wide, muscular body. At the age of 7 he shocked the town, with carrying a bucket of water with his teeth from the well to the house of his parents. At the age of 8 he lost both his parents.

When he turned 18, he left Poland and went to Cuba. He found a job as a porter at the port of Havana. A strong young man, weighing 130 kg, he joined the circus as a wrestler and toured in the United States, Mexico and Argentina.

In 1938 he returned to Eastern Europe within an international group of wrestlers, which hosted the circus of Warsaw. He used to get into the ring with a giant Star of David painted on his shirt, and many young Jews identify with his character. When the rest of the wrestlers returned to the United States, Kozalchik stayed in Poland to start a family.

In 1941, the Germans entered the town of Krynica, where he was born and lived. When a 100 kg unexploded bomb was found in a house, Kozalchik picked it up and carried it out of the city. The Germans nicknamed Kozalchik the "Bombenträger" and appointed him to be the commander of the Jewish ghetto police.

In November 1942, the ghetto was liquidated in Krynica. All Jews, including his wife and two small children, were murdered at the Treblinka extermination camp. He was sent to command the camp "factory," where 350 Jews worked for the benefit of the German war machine.

In May 1943 became a Kapo in Auschwitz's Block 11, which was known as the "death block." His job was to distribute food to detainees held in 28 cells, clear the block, execute spanking, and lead the condemned to the "black wall" in front of the executions that were carried out in the courtyard of the block.

In June 1946, Kozalchik came to Israel. He opened a kiosk in Holon and later on returned to be an active strongman and a professional wrestler under the name of Samson Eisen. In 1947, he went on tour in England.

In September 1946, Haaretz published reports claiming Kozalchik collaborated with the Nazis. In response, Kozalchik asked for evidence. Kozalchik brought Auschwitz survivors who testified that the news was false and that Kozalchik, in fact, helped many Jews. But the rumors continued and, after a few years, destroyed his career as an entertainer.

Allegations of collaboration with the Nazis damaged Kozalchik's health as he suffered from depression and spent most of the day sleeping. On the evening of 13 June 1953, he died at his home in Holon when he was only 50.

== See also ==
- Professional wrestling in Israel
- List of Jewish professional wrestlers
