= Flesh Gordon (professional wrestler) =

French professional wrestler

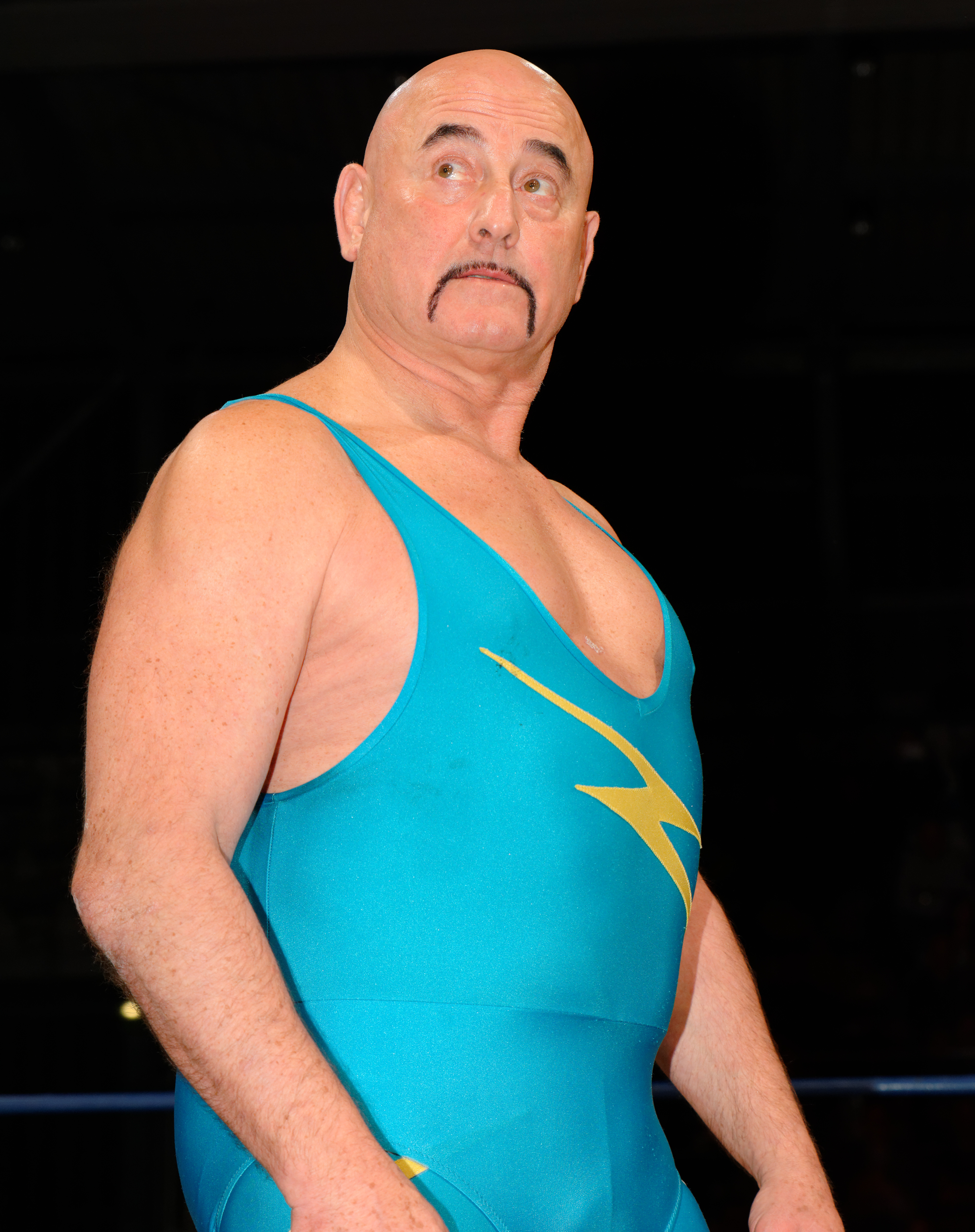

Personal information
- Born: Gérard Hervé; 20 June 1953 (age 73) France

Professional wrestling career
- Ring name(s): Flesh Gordon; Super Flèche
- Billed height: 1.78 m (5 ft 10 in)
- Billed weight: 100 kg (220 lb)
- Debut: 1973
- Retired: 2016

Gérard Hervé (born June 20, 1953, Villeneuve-Saint-Georges in Val-de-Marne) is a French wrestler better known under the name Flesh Gordon.

He was a dominant fan favorite in France from the 1980s when his matches first began airing on national television until his 2016 retirement. He is co-promoter, along with veteran heel Jacky Richard, of nationwide promotion Wrestling Stars (formerly the IWSF - International Wrestling Stars Federation).

== Career ==
Hervé practiced boxing from the age of fourteen as well as pankration. In the 1970s, he went to Mexico and discovered lucha libre. He started in wrestling as Super Flèche.

By 1979 he had returned home and made his debut on French TV Wrestling, initially under his real name but soon adopting the Flesh Gordon identity. He wrestled for the FFCP, regularly teaming with Walter Bordes, with whom he co-held the FFCP French Tag Team Championship. Later in the decade he would team with Prince Zéfy. He became a regular on TF1/Eurosport's New Catch programme, also appearing in Wales for Welsh language channel S4C's Reslo wrestling show and home video releases by the German CWA.

He became FFCP European champion in 1988 and World Light Heavyweight champion in 1992, then created a wrestling school in Faremoutiers in Seine et Marne.

In 1995, Belgian TV show Strip-Tease devoted an episode to him entitled Flesh Gordon and the Firemen.

He wrestled for French wrestling promotion Wrestling Stars (formerly IWSF) since its creation in 2001, it having evolved out of his earlier KMG promotion he had co-founded in 1979 with partners Evelyne Kaluza and the brothers Moïse and Marc Mehnaoui.

Gordon retired February 9, 2016 and subsequently became a trainer. He holds the position of National Technical Director with Wrestling Stars.

== Championships and accomplishments ==
- Fédération Française de Catch Professionnel
  - European Championship
  - French Tag Team Championship (1 time) – with Walter Bordes
- International Wrestling Stars Federation
  - World Light Heavyweight Championship
