= Emil Klank =

American wrestler, trainer, and manager

Emil Klank (June 19, 1876 - June 27, 1940) was a wrestler, trainer, and manager that flourished in the 1910s.

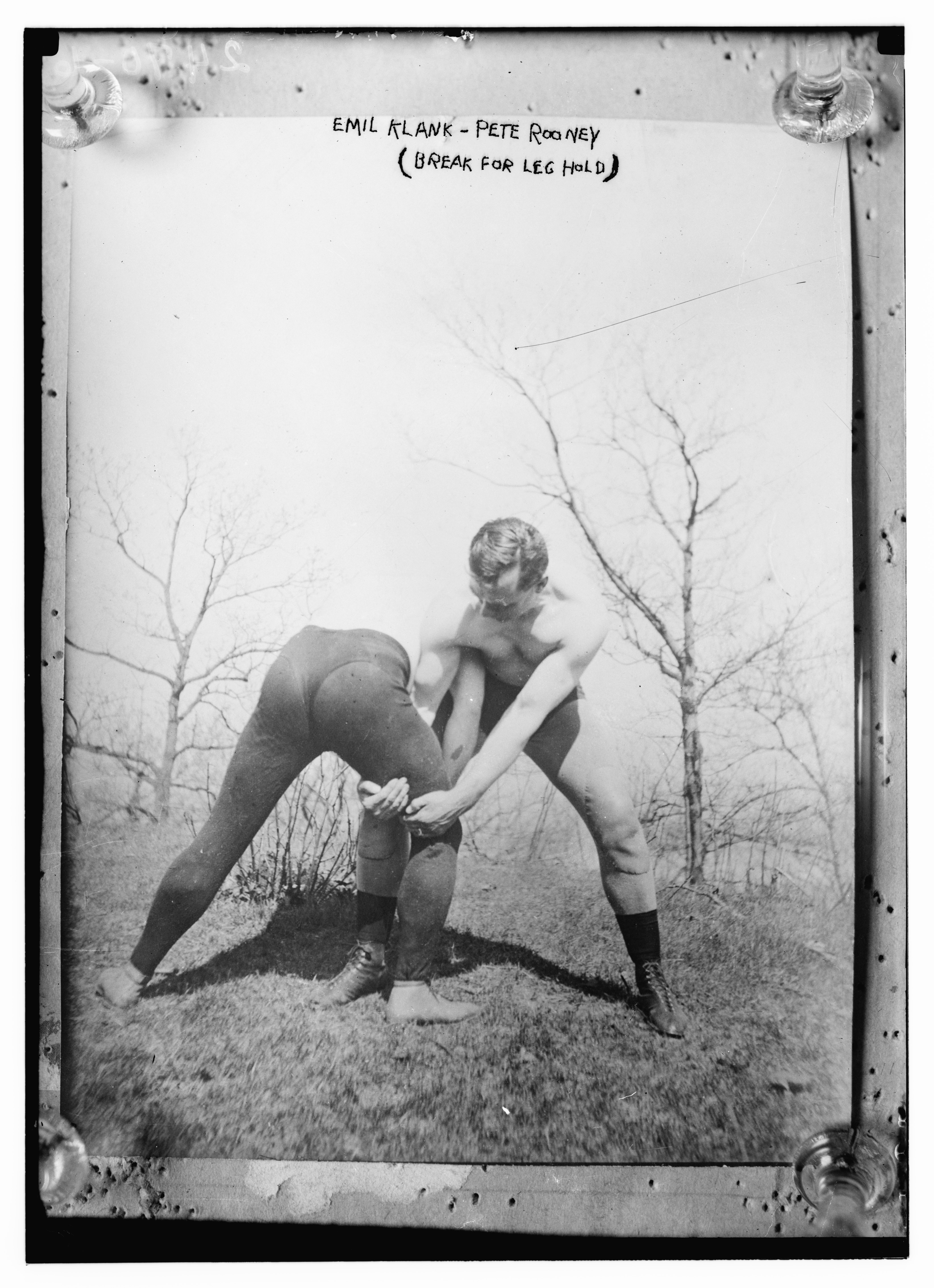

== Biography ==
He was born on June 19, 1876, in Chicago, Illinois and in 1918 was working as a policeman in Chicago. He was the trainer for brothers Silent Rowan and Mike Rowan, and later was wrestler Frank Gotch's manager. He died on June 27, 1940, in Hot Springs, Arkansas.

He fought in mixed style challenge matches. For example, in 1902 for $100 a-side against Tony Harris in Catch as catch can wrestling and Cornish wrestling.
