= Fédération Française de Catch Professionnel =

First professional wrestling promotion in France

- Acronym: FFCP
- Founded: 1933
- Defunct: 1989 (reactivated 2006)
- Style: Professional wrestling, Sports entertainment, French catch
- Headquarters: Paris, France (1933–1989); Wissous, France (2006–)
- Founder: Raoul Paoli
- Owner(s): Raoul Paoli (1933–1960); Roger Delaporte (1960–1989); Marc Mercier (2006–)

Fédération Française de Catch Professionnel (French pronunciation: [fedeʁɑsjɔ̃ fʁɑ̃sɛːz də katʃ pʁɔfɛsjɔnɛl]; lit. 'French Federation of Professional Wrestling'; FFCP) is a professional wrestling promotion based in France, originally active from 1933 until 1989. and later revived in the 21st century. The organization was founded by Raoul Paoli and functioned as a governing body somewhat similar to the U.S.-based National Wrestling Alliance, the British Joint Promotions, the German VdB or the Spanish CIC (Corporación Internacional de Catch). With Henri Deglane as its headliner, the promotion set a number of attendance records in the 1930s that remained unbroken in France and continental Europe until the arrival of the World Wrestling Federation in the late 1980s. In 2006, the promotion was revived by former FFCP wrestler Marc Mercier who ran several national tours in conjunction with his Catch Academy wrestling school in 2007–2008, and again in 2018.

== Creation ==
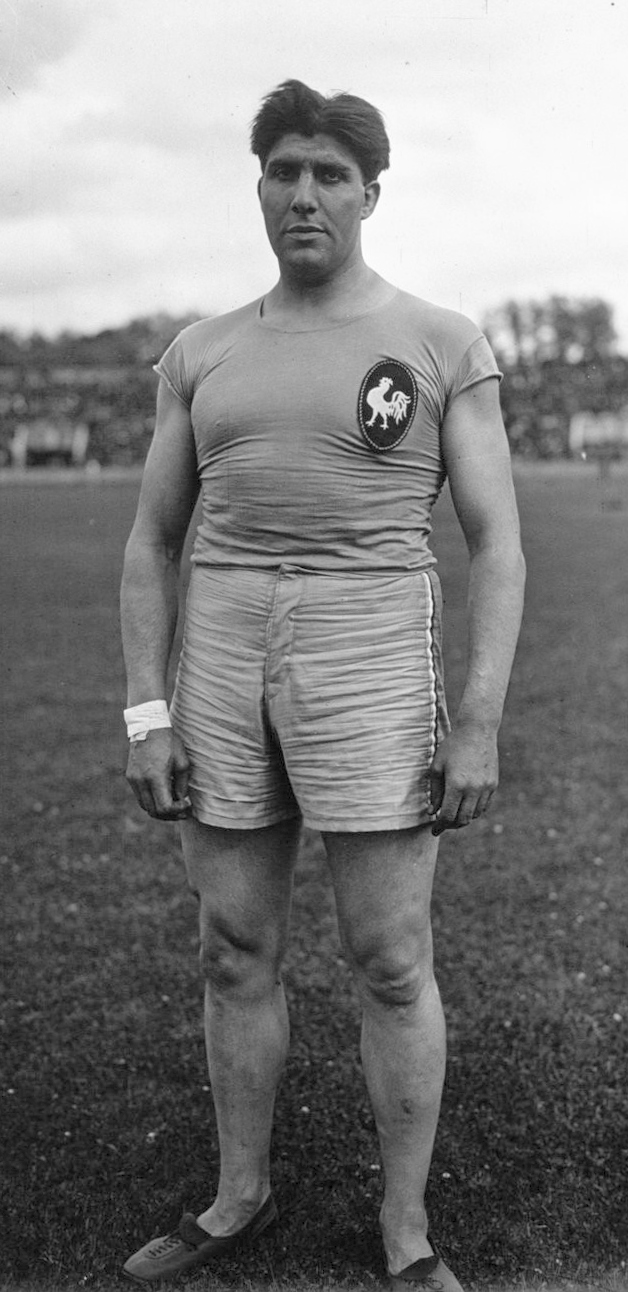
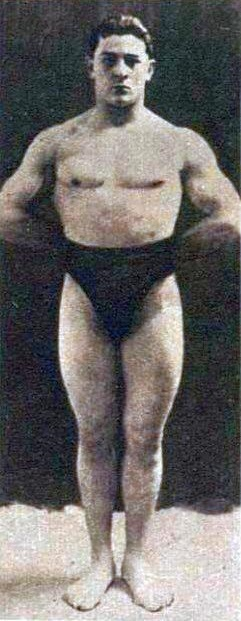
Raoul Paoli (left) and Henri Deglane (right), both French Olympic champions, co-founded the Fédération Française de Catch Professionnel in 1933.

In 1933, Raoul Paoli, a French rugby player and all-round athlete, helped his friend Henri Deglane, a Greco-Roman wrestling gold medalist at the 1924 Summer Olympics, to popularize wrestling in France. In 1933 the two men co-founded the FFCP. The style of wrestling which was promoted by the FCCP was a flashy American style known as "Catch" as it was based on catch wrestling.

With their friends Charles Rigoulot and Julien Duvivier, both top athletes, they introduced wrestling at the Velodrome d'Hiver in Paris. They became affiliated with the Fédération Française de Lutte (FFL), effectively becoming the professional branch of wrestling within the organization at that time. That same year, a French troupe of wrestlers performed in Madrid, Spain, and introduced "modern" catch and U.S.-style pro wrestling to Spanish audiences for the first time. Five months later, the FFCP held the earliest-known catch wrestling show in Barcelona on 25 October 1933, headlined by Henri Deglane and Sailor Arnold.

Deglane was the country's top star throughout the 1930s. His bouts against Dan Koloff, Charlie Santen and Ed "Strangler" Lewis drew a record 15,000 people at the Palais des Sports during 1933–34. One Palais des Sports show featuring Dan Koloff vs. Charles Rigoulot on 22 January 1934 topped 18,000. The promotion set a number of attendance records for pro wrestling in Western Europe during the 1930s. As of 2022, the Koloff vs. Rigoulot bout still remains the most attended pro wrestling event in France. Dan Koloff went on to become Deglane's main rival for the French-version of the European Heavyweight Championship.

Raoul Paoli became the first president of the Fédération Française de Catch Professionnel (FFCP), and the first wrestling matchmaker in France. Raoul Paoli died on 23 March 1960, in Paris, leaving his chair empty.

== The Golden Age ==
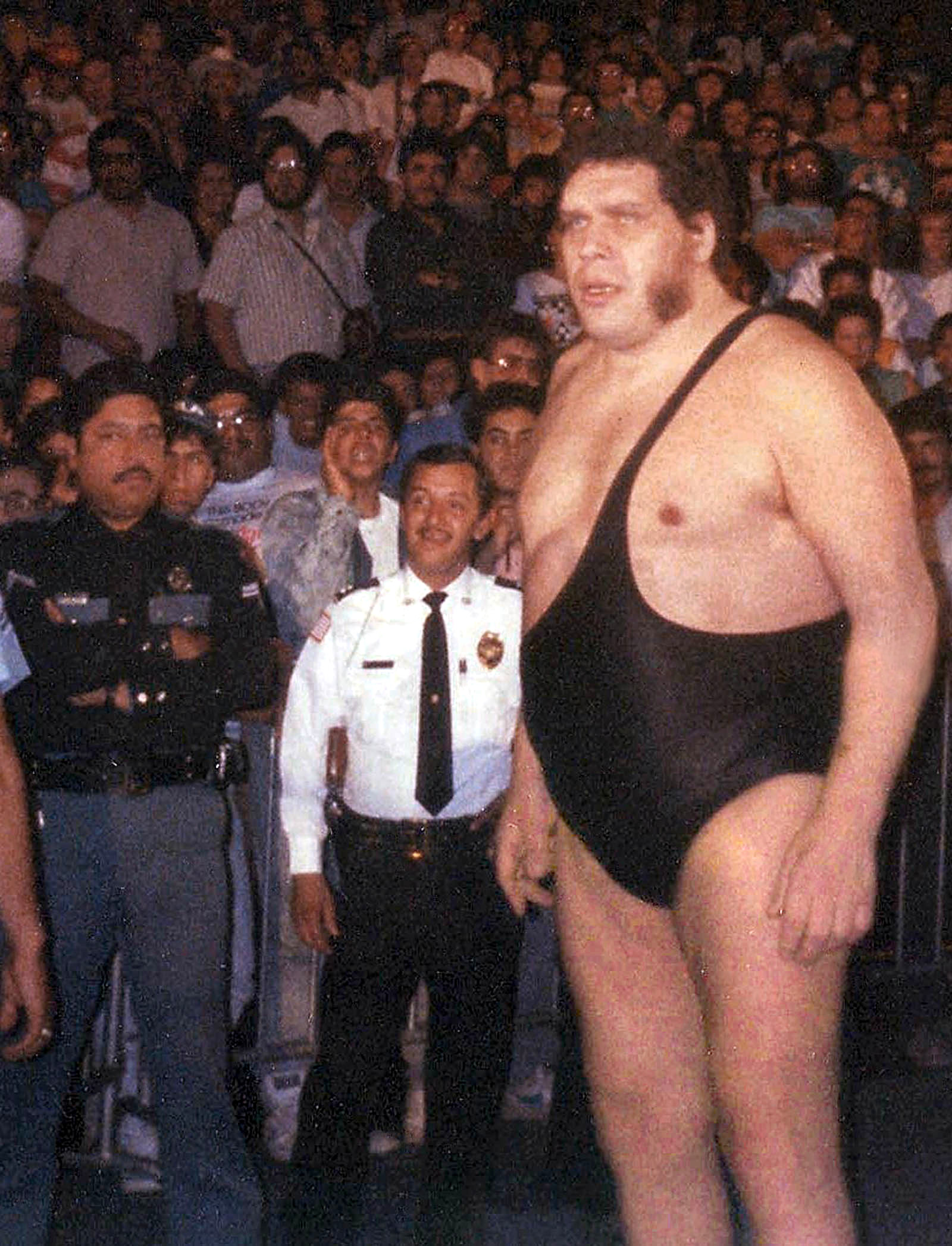
Andre the Giant began his wrestling career in the FFCP.

From 1960 until the 1980s, professional wrestling in France was at its peak. During this period, no less than seven venues held shows in Paris every week: the Élysée Montmartre, the Salle Wagram, the Stadium, the Palais des Sports de Paris, La Mutualité, the Cirque d'hiver and the Vel d'Hiv. The Élysée Montmartre is the scene of many television broadcasts on the ORTF). Its owner and star wrestler of the time Roger Delaporte – later a referee with a reputation for physically imposing order in matches – was one of the great wrestling bookers of France. He successively directed the Fédération Française de Lutteurs Indépendants (FFLI) and then the Fédération Française de Catch Professionnel following the death of Raoul Paoli. Robert Lageat, a promoter for the FFCP, is credited with discovering Andre the Giant (then known as Jean Ferré) who made his pro wrestling debut for the promotion in Rouen on 25 January 1966.

At the end of the 1980s, Roger Delaporte retired and sold the Élysée Montmartre to the production company Garance Productions. The Fédération Française de Catch Professionnel remained in limbo for nearly 20 years.

== Revival ==
In 2006, Marc Mercier, a former wrestler from Delaporte's company who in 1987 – through talent exchanges between Delaporte and Max Crabtree – had appeared on ITV in the UK to unsuccessfully challenge Marty Jones for his World Mid Heavyweight championship, made agreements with the latter to reactivate the federation, which was one of the first wrestling associations in the world. Indeed, wrestling, already popular in the United States in the 1930s, waited until 1948 to have its first national association: the National Wrestling Alliance (NWA)... (Untrue, the American Wrestling Association and National Wrestling Association had already existed in the U.S. for decades. The NWAlliance was just the renamed Midwest Wrestling Association). Mercier created the Catch Academy in 2006 in Wissous, a school designed to train a new generation of French wrestlers. Several waves of men and women learned the rudiments of wrestling through the various facilities of the school (from Wissous to Villejuif through Chennevières, Choisy-le-Roi and Ris-Orangis). The FFCP held its first national tour during the summer of 2007, showcasing its Catch Academy students, and received coverage from a number of mainstream publications including, most notably, Le Télégramme. During this period, Mercier and his Catch Academy students participated in a number of television and radio public service announcements as well as public appearances at schools, colleges and community centers raising awareness of French children who had suffered serious injuries attempting to imitate American-style professional wrestling moves. In July 2009, the FFCP opened a training facility in Angers with a focus on helping children from low-income households. In July 2012, Catch Academy held a summer training program for teenagers in Laparade.

President Marc Mercier's goal was to revitalize and reorganize the sport through appealing and media-friendly events. If the Fédération Française de Catch Professionnel is now back in the news, the fact remains that a huge work of general restructuring of wrestling still remains to be done in France, and this while awaiting a state legislation aiming at supporting the profession. Shows produced by the FFCP in 2013 were covered by Midi Libre, La Provence and Les Inrockuptibles. Around this time, Mercier pitched a reality tv-style series following students at Catch Academy but was considered too expensive to produce.

In February 2014, Marc Mercier decided to entrust the presidency of the FFCP to the young referee and ex-wrestler from Bordeaux, Artémis d'Ortygie, appointing in turn Norbert Feuillan as vice-president. In March 2014, the promotion was profiled by Sud Ouest. D'Ortygie left the position of president in May 2014 to pursue personal projects, Marc Mercier resumed her position as president of the FFCP. On 22 May 2017, referee Jérémy Grand joined Marc Mercier as vice president, replacing Norbert Feuillan who also resigned. Feuillan went on to become a French-language commentator for AEW Dynamite with Alain Mistrangelo on the Toonami channel.

In October 2017, the Fédération Française de Catch Professionnel announced another national tour, the Catch Academy Tour 3, which is based on the model of the first Catch Academy Tour of 2007 to train a new generation of wrestlers, and was scheduled to visit at least 20 cities across France starting in March 2018. Despite low turnout for its April shows, the promotion finished the tour holding its finale in Saint-Germain-le-Gaillard on 22 September 2018.

Mercier retired from the FFCP presidency, aged 65, in February 2024 after 49 years in the wrestling industry. He died 7 September 2026.

== Dispute with Wrestling Stars promotion ==
Today, FFCP is one of two main promotions in France to cater for the "traditional"/"old school" style of European professional wrestling, the other being Wrestling Stars, formerly the International Wrestling Stars Federation (IWSF) run by veteran wrestler Jacky Richard and starring Flesh Gordon (Gérard Hervé). Relations between the two promotions are extremely poor with each accusing the other of being fraudulent and refusing to speak to journalists who interview the other side.

== Championships ==
=== World Championships ===
- World Heavyweight Championship (French version)
- World Light Heavyweight Championship (Spanish version)

=== European Championships ===
- European Heavyweight Championship
- European Mid-Heavyweight Championship
- European Light Heavyweight Championship
- European Middleweight Championship
- European Welterweight Championship

=== French Championships ===
- French Heavyweight Championship
- French Light Heavyweight Championship
- French Middleweight Championship
- French Welterweight Championship
- French Lightweight Championship
- French Tag Team Championship

=== Revived Championships ===
- FFCP France Championship
- FFCP Heavyweight Championship
- FFCP Intercontinental Championship
- FFCP Women's Championship
