= Salman Hashimikov =

Soviet and Russian heavyweight wrestler (1953–2025)

- Born: Salman Alkhauzurovich Hashimikov; 4 May 1952; Kazakh SSR, USSR
- Died: 28 May 2025 (aged 73); Moscow, Russia
- Height: 5 ft 10 in (1.78 m)
- Weight: 264 lb (120 kg)
Medal record
Representing the Soviet Union
Men's Freestyle wrestling
World Championships
Gold medal – first place	1979 San Diego	+100 kg
Gold medal – first place	1981 Skopje	+100 kg
Gold medal – first place	1982 Edmonton	+100 kg
Gold medal – first place	1983 Kiev	+100 kg
World Cup
Gold medal – first place	1982 Toledo	+100 kg
European Championships
Gold medal – first place	1979 Bucharest	+100 kg
Gold medal – first place	1981 Łódź	+100 kg
Silver medal – second place	1980 Prievidza	+100 kg
Silver medal – second place	1984 Jönköping	+100 kg
Summer Universiade
Gold medal – first place	1977 Sofia	+100 kg
Representing CSKA
USSR Championships
Gold medal – first place	1979 Moscow	+100 kg
Gold medal – first place	1980 Moscow	+100 kg
Gold medal – first place	1982 Ordzhonikidze	+100 kg
Gold medal – first place	1983 Moscow	+100 kg
Silver medal – second place	1981 Ulan-Ude	+100 kg
Bronze medal – third place	1978 Minsk	+100 kg
- Professional wrestling career
- Ring name: Salman Hashimikov
- Billed from: Tbilisi, U.S.S.R.
- Trained by: Antonio Inoki; NJPW Dojo
- Debut: 22 February 1989
- Retired: 1994

Salman Alkhazurovich Hashimikov (Russian: Салман Алхазурович Хасимиков), also spelled Hasimikov or Khasimikov (4 May 1952 – 28 May 2025), was a Soviet heavyweight wrestler. A Chechen from Russia, he won two European and four World Championship gold medals in freestyle wrestling (1979, 1981, 1982, 1983). He had also won European and World gold as a Junior in 1970–71. After an unsuccessful business career, Salman spent five years as a professional wrestler in Japan at New Japan Pro-Wrestling (NJPW). There he won the IWGP Heavyweight Championship from Big Van Vader in May 1989.

== Career ==
Salman achieved significant success in both amateur freestyle wrestling and professional wrestling. A four-time World Champion (1979, 1981, 1982, 1983) in international freestyle wrestling during the late 1970s and early 1980s.

=== New Japan (1989–1990) ===
After a long career as an amateur wrestler Hashimikov and Victor Zangiev travelled to Japan training for a professional wrestling career in the NJPW Dojo, specifically by NJPW founder Antonio Inoki. Hashimikov made his debut against his friend Zangiev on 22 February 1989, in a five-minute exhibition match that ended in a draw between the two former amateur world champions, then he defeated Hiro Saito. On 25 May of that year Hashimikov defeated Big Van Vader to become the first European to hold the IWGP Heavyweight Championship. His reign was short lived as he lost the championship in his first defense only 48 days later, to Riki Choshu. Hashimikov was the first actual Russian-born to win a professional wrestling title in the capitalist countries before the Cold War ended, at the time most "Russians" in North America and Japan were in fact characters played by either Russian descendants or wrestlers with no Russian connection.

=== World Championship Wrestling (1990) ===
In December 1990 Hashimikov and Zangiev travelled to the United States for their first, and only wrestling show, the 1990 Starrcade. At Starrcade they participated in the Pat O'Connor memorial tag team tournament. In the first round they defeated the team of Danny Johnson and Troy Montour representing Canada. In the second round the Russian team lost to NJPW representatives Mr. Saito and The Great Muta. After WCW, Hashimikov took a hiatus from wrestling.

=== UWFI Japan (1993–1994) ===
Upon his return to Japan, Hashimikov began working for UWF International in 1993 where he teamed with fellow Kazakhstani, Vladimir Berkovich. Also he reunited with Victor Zangiev. He lost to Nobuhiko Takada on 18 July. On 3 April 1994, he lost to Big Van Vader. Later that year he retired from wrestling.

== Legacy and death ==
In 2018, in the village of Staraya Sunzha, Leninsky District of Grozny, Lenin Street was ceremoniously renamed after him.

On May 28, 2025, Hashimikov died from heart failure at a Moscow hospital, at the age of 73.

== Championships and accomplishments ==
- New Japan Pro-Wrestling

- IWGP Heavyweight Championship (1 time)

Awards and achievements
Preceded by Big Van Vader	5th IWGP Heavyweight Champion; 25 May 1989 – 12 July 1989	Succeeded by Riki Choshu
