= List of FMW supercards and pay-per-view events =

Frontier Martial-Arts Wrestling was a Japanese hardcore wrestling promotion founded by Atsushi Onita in 1989. The event held its first card on October 6, 1989, and the first supercard was titled Battle Creation which took place on December 10, 1989. The event held many supercards and the most prestigious show was the FMW Anniversary Show. The company conducted many supercards until 1997 and then produced its first pay-per-view event Entertainment Wrestling Live on April 30, 1998, and continued to broadcast shows via pay-per-view until the promotion closed in 2002.

== Supercards ==
=== 1989 ===
Date	Name	Venue	City	Main event
October 6, 1989	The Grudge in Nagoya	Nagoya Sports Center	Nagoya, Aichi, Japan	Masashi Aoyagi vs. Atsushi Onita
October 10, 1989	The Grudge in Tokyo	Korakuen Hall	Tokyo, Japan	Atsushi Onita vs. Masashi Aoyagi
December 10, 1989	Battle Creation	Korakuen Hall	Tokyo, Japan	Atsushi Onita and Tarzan Goto vs. Jerry Blayman and Mitsuhiro Matsunaga

=== 1990 ===
Date	Name	Venue	City	Main event
January 7, 1990	Battle Resistance - 1st Open Tournament	Korakuen Hall	Tokyo, Japan	Masanobu Korisu vs. Tarzan Goto
February 12, 1990	Battle Brave in Korakuen	Korakuen Hall	Tokyo, Japan	Atsushi Onita vs. Masanobu Korisu
April 1, 1990	Texas Street Fight	Korakuen Hall	Tokyo, Japan	Atsushi Onita and Tarzan Goto vs. Masanobu Korisu and Dragon Master
August 4, 1990	Summer Spectacular in Shiodome	Shiodome	Tokyo, Japan	Atsushi Onita vs. Tarzan Goto
August 25, 1990	Battle Rebellion	Korakuen Hall	Tokyo, Japan	Atsushi Onita vs. Mr. Pogo
November 5, 1990	1st Anniversary Show	Komazawa Gymnasium	Tokyo, Japan	Atsushi Onita vs. Mr. Pogo

=== 1991 ===
Date	Name	Venue	City	Main event
September 23, 1991	2nd Anniversary Show: Fall Spectacular	Kawasaki Stadium	Kawasaki, Kanagawa, Japan	Atsushi Onita vs. Tarzan Goto

=== 1992 ===
Date	Name	Venue	City	Main event
May 16, 1992	FMW/WWA in Los Angeles	California State Gymnasium	Los Angeles, California, United States	Atsushi Onita, Tarzan Goto and El Hijo del Santo vs. Negro Casas, Tim Patterson and Horace Boulder
September 19, 1992	3rd Anniversary Show: Fall Spectacular	Yokohama Stadium	Yokohama, Japan	Tiger Jeet Singh vs. Atsushi Onita

=== 1993 ===
Date	Name	Venue	City	Main event
May 5, 1993	4th Anniversary Show: Origin	Kawasaki Stadium	Kawasaki, Kanagawa, Japan	Atsushi Onita vs. Terry Funk
August 22, 1993	Summer Spectacular	Hankyu Nishinomiya Stadium	Nishinomiya, Hyōgo, Japan	Atsushi Onita vs. Mr. Pogo
December 8, 1993	Year End Spectacular	Harumi Dome	Tokyo, Japan	Atsushi Onita vs. Mitsuhiro Matsunaga
December 26, 1993	FMW/MPW	Korakuen Hall	Tokyo, Japan	Atsushi Onita, Tarzan Goto and The Great Sasuke vs. Mr. Pogo, Jinsei Shinzaki and Masaru Toi

=== 1994 ===
Date	Name	Venue	City	Main event
May 5, 1994	5th Anniversary Show	Kawasaki Stadium	Kawasaki, Kanagawa, Japan	Genichiro Tenryu vs. Atsushi Onita
July 14, 1994	FMW/LLPW/AJW	Tokyo Coliseum	Tokyo, Japan	Bull Nakano vs. Shinobu Kandori
August 28, 1994	Summer Spectacular	Osaka-jō Hall	Osaka, Japan	Atsushi Onita vs. Masashi Aoyagi

=== 1995 ===
Date	Name	Venue	City	Main event
May 5, 1995	6th Anniversary Show	Kawasaki Stadium	Kawasaki, Kanagawa, Japan	Atsushi Onita vs. Hayabusa
December 21, 1995	Year End Spectacular	Bunka Gym	Yokohama, Japan	Hayabusa, Koji Nakagawa and The Great Sasuke vs. Ricky Fuji, Super Delfin and Taka Michinoku
December 22, 1995	Yamato Nadeshiko II	Korakuen Hall	Tokyo, Japan	Megumi Kudo vs. Shark Tsuchiya

=== 1996 ===
Date	Name	Venue	City	Main event
April 4, 1996	Yamato Nadeshiko III	Osaka Prefectural Gymnasium	Osaka, Japan	Megumi Kudo and KAORU vs. Combat Toyoda and Chigusa Nagayo
May 5, 1996	7th Anniversary Show	Kawasaki Stadium	Kawasaki, Kanagawa, Japan	Hayabusa and Masato Tanaka vs. Puerto Rican Army (Terry Funk and Mr. Pogo)
August 1, 1996	Summer Spectacular: Shiodome Legend	Shiodome	Tokyo, Japan	Mr. Pogo vs. Terry Funk
December 11, 1996	Year End Spectacular	Komazawa Gymnasium	Tokyo, Japan	Atsushi Onita, Mr. Pogo, Masato Tanaka and Tetsuhiro Kuroda vs. Funk Masters of Wrestling (Terry Funk, Hisakatsu Oya and The Headhunters)

=== 1997 ===
Date	Name	Venue	City	Main event
April 29, 1997	8th Anniversary Show	Yokohama Arena	Yokohama, Japan	Megumi Kudo vs. Shark Tsuchiya
May 8, 1997	Japanese Survival	Korakuen Hall	Tokyo, Japan	Hido, The Great Nita and W*ING Kanemura vs. Fuyuki-Gun (Kodo Fuyuki, Jado and Gedo)
August 2, 1997	Shiodome Legend	Shiodome	Tokyo, Japan	Masato Tanaka vs. W*ING Kanemura
September 28, 1997	Fall Spectacular: Kawasaki Legend	Kawasaki Stadium	Kawasaki, Kanagawa, Japan	Atsushi Onita vs. W*ING Kanemura

=== 1998 ===
Date	Name	Venue	City	Main event
August 11, 1998	Atsushi Onita Presents Liar, Liar	Korakuen Hall	Tokyo, Japan	Atsushi Onita, Mr. Pogo, Shoichi Arai and Yoshinori Sasaki vs. Go Ito and Team No Respect (Kodo Fuyuki, Koji Nakagawa and Yukihiro Kanemura)

=== 1999 ===
Date	Name	Venue	City	Main event
August 20, 1999	Goodbye Hayabusa II: Haunted House	Korakuen Hall	Tokyo, Japan	Masato Tanaka vs. Mr. Gannosuke

=== 2001 ===
Date	Name	Venue	City	Main event
July 24, 2001	Rolling Thunder Riverside Death Match Series In Edogawa Kyotei	River Boat Race Field	Edogawa, Tokyo, Japan	Hayabusa and GOEMON vs. Kodo Fuyuki and Mammoth Sasaki; Hayabusa and GOEMON vs. Kodo Fuyuki and Chocoball Mukai
November 3, 2001	Iizuka Car Race Special I		Iizuka, Fukuoka, Japan	Onryo and Tetsuhiro Kuroda vs. Kodo Fuyuki and Chocoball Mukai
November 4, 2001	Iizuka Car Race Special II		Iizuka, Fukuoka, Japan	Kintaro Kanemura, Kodo Fuyuki and Mr. Gannosuke vs. GOEMON, Onryo and Ricky Fuji

== Pay-per-views ==
=== 1998 ===
Date	Name	Venue	City	Main event
April 30, 1998	9th Anniversary Show: Entertainment Wrestling Live	Yokohama Cultural Gymnasium	Yokohama, Japan	Mr. Gannosuke vs. Hayabusa
May 19, 1998	Neo 1998: Day 1	Korakuen Hall	Tokyo, Japan	Hayabusa vs. Masato Tanaka
June 19, 1998	King of Fight 1998: Day 2	Korakuen Hall	Tokyo, Japan	Hayabusa, Hisakatsu Oya, Ricky Fuji and Daisuke Ikeda vs. Team No Respect (Kodo Fuyuki, Koji Nakagawa, Gedo and Yukihiro Kanemura)
July 10, 1998	King of Fight II 1998: Day 2	Korakuen Hall	Tokyo, Japan	Hayabusa, Hisakatsu Oya, Ricky Fuji and Daisuke Ikeda vs. Team No Respect (Kodo Fuyuki, Koji Nakagawa, Jado and Gedo)
August 22, 1998	Welcome to the Darkside	DirecTV Studios	Tokyo, Japan	Darkside Hayabusa vs. Koji Nakagawa
September 8, 1998	Super Dynamism 1998: Day 11	Korakuen Hall	Tokyo, Japan	Hayabusa and Daisuke Ikeda vs. Kodo Fuyuki and Yukihiro Kanemura
October 6, 1998	Flashover 1998: Day 10	Korakuen Hall	Tokyo, Japan	Hayabusa vs. Koji Nakagawa
November 20, 1998	Scramble Survivor 1998: Day 6	Bunka Gym	Yokohama, Japan	Hayabusa vs. Kodo Fuyuki
December 12, 1998	ECW/FMW Supershow I	Korakuen Hall	Tokyo, Japan	Hayabusa and Tommy Dreamer vs. Rob Van Dam and Sabu
December 13, 1998	ECW/FMW Supershow II	Korakuen Hall	Tokyo, Japan	Dudley Boyz (Bubba Ray Dudley and D-Von Dudley) vs. Rob Van Dam and Sabu

=== 1999 ===
Date	Name	Venue	City	Main event
January 5, 1999	New Year Generation 1999: Day 1	Korakuen Hall	Tokyo, Japan	Hisakatsu Oya vs. Mr. Gannosuke
February 27, 1999	Over the Top Super Fighting Spirit Part Two: Day 7	Korakuen Hall	Tokyo, Japan	Masato Tanaka vs. Tetsuhiro Kuroda
March 29, 1999	Round Robin Tag League: Day 8	Korakuen Hall	Tokyo, Japan	Hayabusa and Kodo Fuyuki vs. Masato Tanaka and Tetsuhiro Kuroda
April 20, 1999	Strongest Tag League: Day 1	Korakuen Hall	Tokyo, Japan	Hayabusa and Kodo Fuyuki vs. Daisuke Ikeda and Muhammad Yone
May 5, 1999	Strongest Tag League: Day 7	Bunka Gym	Yokohama, Japan	Kodo Fuyuki vs. Tetsuhiro Kuroda
June 15, 1999	Making of a New Legend: Day 2	Korakuen Hall	Tokyo, Japan	Hayabusa, Masato Tanaka and Tetsuhiro Kuroda vs. Mr. Gannosuke, Yukihiro Kanemura and Hido
July 31, 1999	Goodbye Hayabusa: Day 7	Korakuen Hall	Tokyo, Japan	Hayabusa, Masato Tanaka and Tetsuhiro Kuroda vs. Kodo Fuyuki, Koji Nakagawa and Gedo
August 23, 1999	Goodbye Hayabusa II: Hayabusa Graduation Ceremony	Korakuen Hall	Tokyo, Japan	Yukihiro Kanemura vs. Hayabusa
August 25, 1999	Goodbye Hayabusa II: Last Match	Nakajima Sports Center	Sapporo, Hokkaido, Japan	Hayabusa vs. Mr. Gannosuke
September 24, 1999	Making of a New Legend III: Day 6	Korakuen Hall	Tokyo, Japan	H, Tetsuhiro Kuroda, Flying Kid Ichihara and Yoshinori Sasaki vs. "Hayabusa", Koji Nakagawa, Gedo and Chocoball Mukai
October 29, 1999	Making of a New Legend IV: Day 7	Korakuen Hall	Tokyo, Japan	Masato Tanaka, Tetsuhiro Kuroda, Hisakatsu Oya and Ricky Fuji vs. Kodo Fuyuki, Kintaro Kanemura, Koji Nakagawa and Jado
November 23, 1999	10th Anniversary Show: Entertainment Wrestling Special Live	Yokohama Arena	Yokohama, Japan	H vs. "Hayabusa"
December 12, 1999	Making of a New Legend VI: Day 5	Korakuen Hall	Tokyo, Japan	H and Mr. Gannosuke vs. Masato Tanaka and Tetsuhiro Kuroda

=== 2000 ===
Date	Name	Venue	City	Main event
January 5, 2000	New Year Generation 2000: Day 1	Korakuen Hall	Tokyo, Japan	Masato Tanaka vs. Tetsuhiro Kuroda
February 25, 2000	Cluster Battle 2000: Day 5	Korakuen Hall	Tokyo, Japan	H and Mr. Gannosuke vs. Kodo Fuyuki and Kyoko Inoue
March 27, 2000	Winning Road 2000: Day 1	Korakuen Hall	Tokyo, Japan	Tetsuhiro Kuroda vs. Kodo Fuyuki
April 11, 2000	Winning Road 2000: Day 11	Korakuen Hall	Tokyo, Japan	H and Mr. Gannosuke vs. Masato Tanaka and Balls Mahoney
May 5, 2000	11th Anniversary Show: Backdraft	Komazawa Gymnasium	Tokyo, Japan	H vs. Masato Tanaka
June 16, 2000	Neo 2000: Day 14	Korakuen Hall	Tokyo, Japan	Darkside of H and "Hayabusa" vs. Kodo Fuyuki and GOEMON
July 28, 2000	King of Fight 2000 II: Day 9	Korakuen Hall	Tokyo, Japan	Hayabusa, Masato Tanaka and Hisakatsu Oya vs. Kodo Fuyuki, Jinsei Shinzaki and Mr. Gannosuke
August 28, 2000	Super Dynamism 2000: Day 4	Korakuen Hall	Tokyo, Japan	Hayabusa vs. Mr. Gannosuke
September 26, 2000	Flashover 2000: Day 8	Korakuen Hall	Tokyo, Japan	Kodo Fuyuki vs. Hayabusa
October 29, 2000	Power Splash 2000: Day 11	Korakuen Hall	Tokyo, Japan	Hayabusa and Onryo vs. Kodo Fuyuki and GOEMON
November 12, 2000	Deep Throat	Bunka Gym	Yokohama, Japan	Kodo Fuyuki vs. Hayabusa
November 28, 2000	Scramble Survivor 2000: Day 8	Korakuen Hall	Tokyo, Japan	Kodo Fuyuki, Kintaro Kanemura and Tetsuhiro Kuroda vs. Complete Players (Masato Tanaka, Jado and Gedo)
December 10, 2000	Year End Sensation 2000: Day 4	Korakuen Hall	Tokyo, Japan	Masato Tanaka, Jado, Gedo & Kaori Nakayama beat Kodo Fuyuki, Tetsuhiro Kuroda, Kintaro Kanemura, and Azusa Kudo)
December 20, 2000	Year End Sensation 2000: Day 6	Korakuen Hall	Tokyo, Japan	Kodo Fuyuki, Kintaro Kanemura and Tetsuhiro Kuroda vs. Complete Players (Masato Tanaka, Jado and Gedo)

=== 2001 ===
Date	Name	Venue	City	Main event
January 7, 2001	New Year Generation 2001: Day 1	Korakuen Hall	Tokyo, Japan	Kodo Fuyuki and Tetsuhiro Kuroda vs. Masato Tanaka and Gedo
January 16, 2001	New Year Generation 2001: Day 6	Korakuen Hall	Tokyo, Japan	Kodo Fuyuki vs. Tetsuhiro Kuroda
February 6, 2001	New Year Generation 2001: Day 6	Korakuen Hall	Tokyo, Japan	Kodo Fuyuki, GOEMON and Onryo vs. Tetsuhiro Kuroda, Mammoth Sasaki and Kyoko Inoue
February 23, 2001	Cluster Battle 2001: Day 10	Korakuen Hall	Tokyo, Japan	Kodo Fuyuki and The Great Sasuke vs. Team Kuroda (Tetsuhiro Kuroda and Mammoth Sasaki)
March 5, 2001	Winning Road 2001: Tag 2	Korakuen Hall	Tokyo, Japan	The Great Sasuke vs. Tetsuhiro Kuroda
March 13, 2001	Winning Road 2001: Tag 7	Korakuen Hall	Tokyo, Japan	Kintaro Kanemura vs. Tetsuhiro Kuroda
April 1, 2001	Fighting Creation 2001: Tag 2	Korakuen Hall	Tokyo, Japan	Kodo Fuyuki vs. Tetsuhiro Kuroda
April 15, 2001	Fighting Creation 2001: Tag 3	Korakuen Hall	Tokyo, Japan	Team Kuroda (Tetsuhiro Kuroda, Mr. Gannosuke and Mammoth Sasaki) vs. The Great Sasuke, GOEMON and Onryo
May 5, 2001	12th Anniversary Show: Kawasaki Legend	Kawasaki Stadium	Kawasaki, Nakagawa, Japan	Hayabusa and The Great Sasuke vs. Team Kuroda (Tetsuhiro Kuroda and Mr. Gannosuke)
May 11, 2001	Neo 2001: Day 1	Korakuen Hall	Tokyo, Japan	Hayabusa, Hisakatsu Oya and Ricky Fuji vs. Team Kuroda (Tetsuhiro Kuroda, Mr. Gannosuke and Mammoth Sasaki)
June 8, 2001	King of Fight 2001: Day 1	Korakuen Hall	Tokyo, Japan	Hayabusa and Tetsuhiro Kuroda vs. Mr. Gannosuke and Kintaro Kanemura
July 20, 2001	King of Fight II 2001: Day 9	Korakuen Hall	Tokyo, Japan	Kodo Fuyuki, Mr. Gannosuke, Kintaro Kanemura and Senmu Yoshida vs. Hayabusa, Tetsuhiro Kuroda, Azusa Kudo and Shoichi Arai
August 3, 2001	Super Dynamism 2001: Day 4	Korakuen Hall	Tokyo, Japan	Mr. Gannosuke, Kintaro Kanemura and Mammoth Sasaki vs. Hayabusa, GOEMON and Onryo
August 11, 2001	Super Dynamism 2001: Day 6	Korakuen Hall	Tokyo, Japan	Hayabusa vs. Kintaro Kanemura
September 9, 2001	Super Dynamism 2001: Day 14	Korakuen Hall	Tokyo, Japan	Kintaro Kanemura, Kodo Fuyuki and Mr. Gannosuke vs. Hayabusa, Tetsuhiro Kuroda and GOEMON
October 9, 2001	Power Splash 2001: Day 4	Korakuen Hall	Tokyo, Japan	Mr. Gannosuke and Mammoth Sasaki vs. Hayabusa and Tetsuhiro Kuroda
October 22, 2001	Power Splash 2001: Day 13	Korakuen Hall	Tokyo, Japan	Hayabusa vs. Mammoth Sasaki
November 5, 2001	Scramble Survivor 2001: Day 1	Korakuen Hall	Tokyo, Japan	Kodo Fuyuki, Arashi and Koki Kitahara vs. Tetsuhiro Kuroda, Hisakatsu Oya and Ricky Fuji
November 23, 2001	Scramble Survivor 2001: Day 1	Korakuen Hall	Tokyo, Japan	Tetsuhiro Kuroda and Garuda vs. Kodo Fuyuki and Genichiro Tenryu
December 9, 2001	FMW PPV	Korakuen Hall	Tokyo, Japan	Team FMW (Tetsuhiro Kuroda, Kintaro Kanemura, Mr. Gannosuke and Mammoth Sasaki) vs. Team WAR (Genichiro Tenryu, Kodo Fuyuki, Arashi and Koki Kitahara)
December 21, 2001	Year End Sensation 2001	Korakuen Hall	Tokyo, Japan	Tetsuhiro Kuroda and Mr. Gannosuke vs. Kintaro Kanemura and Mammoth Sasaki

=== 2002 ===
Date	Name	Venue	City	Main event
January 6, 2002	Power is All	Korakuen Hall	Tokyo, Japan	Kintaro Kanemura vs. Kodo Fuyuki
February 4, 2002	Cluster Battle 2002	Korakuen Hall	Tokyo, Japan	Kodo Fuyuki and The Sandman vs. Sabu and Tetsuhiro Kuroda

== Tours ==
=== 1995 ===
Name	Date	Notes
Grand Slam	August 20, 1995–September 26, 1995	The tour showcased the Grand Slam Tournament to crown a new FMW Brass Knuckles Heavyweight Champion.

=== 1996 ===
Name	Date	Notes
King of Fight	June 17, 1996–June 28, 1996	The build-up to Summer Spectacular. The tour included the FMW Independent Heavyweight Championship tournament.
King of Fight II	July 21, 1996–August 1, 1996	The tour concluded at Summer Spectacular. The tour included the FMW Independent Heavyweight Championship tournament.
Super Dynamism	August 21, 1996–September 1, 1996	The build-up to Year End Spectacular.
Flashover	September 15, 1996–September 24, 1996	The build-up to Year End Spectacular.
Power Splash	October 12, 1996–October 26, 1996	The build-up to Year End Spectacular.
Scramble Survivor	November 6, 1996–November 11, 1996	The build-up to Year End Spectacular.
Year End Sensation	November 26, 1996–December 11, 1996	The tour concluded at Year End Spectacular.

=== 1997 ===
Name	Date	Notes
New Year Generation	January 5, 1997–January 12, 1997	The tour was named after the New Generation of FMW which would lead the company after Atsushi Onita's retirement in 1995.
Cluster Battle	February 9, 1997–February 19, 1997	The build-up to 8th Anniversary Show.
Winning Road	March 12, 1997–March 28, 1997	The build-up to 8th Anniversary Show.
Fighting Creation	April 15, 1997–April 28, 1997	The build-up to 8th Anniversary Show.
Neo FMW	May 13, 1997–May 25, 1997	The build-up to Shiodome Legend 1997.
King of Fight	June 13, 1997–June 22, 1997	The build-up to Shiodome Legend 1997.
King of Fight II	July 19, 1997–July 27, 1997	The build-up to Shiodome Legend 1997.
Super Dynamism	August 21, 1997–August 31, 1997	The build-up to Fall Spectacular 1997.
Flashover	September 15, 1997–September 26, 1997	The build-up to Fall Spectacular 1997.
Power Splash	October 12, 1997–October 21, 1997	
Scramble Survivor	November 15, 1997–November 28, 1997	
Year End Sensation	December 5, 1997–December 13, 1997	
Super Extreme Wrestling War	December 19, 1997–December 22, 1997	The tour marked the beginning of talent exchange and working agreement with Extreme Championship Wrestling and the conclusion of FMW's rivalry with ZEN.

=== 1998 ===
Name	Date	Notes
New Year Generation	January 6, 1998–January 16, 1998	The build-up to Entertainment Wrestling Live.
Cluster Battle	February 4, 1998–February 13, 1998	The build-up to Entertainment Wrestling Live.
Winning Road	March 7, 1998–March 29, 1998	The build-up to Entertainment Wrestling Live.
Fighting Creation	April 21, 1998–April 30, 1998	The tour concluded at Entertainment Wrestling Live.
Neo FMW	May 19, 1998–June 1, 1998	
King of Fight	June 13, 1998–June 28, 1998	
King of Fight II	July 9, 1998–July 27, 1998	
Heaven	August 9, 1998–August 10, 1998	
Super Dynamism	August 21, 1998–September 8, 1998	The tour featured Welcome to the Darkside.
Flashover	September 18, 1998–October 6, 1998	
Power Splash	October 15, 1998–October 24, 1998	
Scramble Survivor	November 1, 1998–November 20, 1998	
Year End Sensation	December 5, 1998–December 13, 1998	The tour featured Over the Top Tournament and ECW/FMW Supershows.

=== 1999 ===
Name	Date	Notes
New Year Generation	January 5, 1999–January 13, 1999	
Over the Top Super Fighting Spirit Part Two	February 11, 1999–February 27, 1999	
Round Robin Tag League	March 20, 1999–March 28, 1999	The tour featured the round-robin tournament for the FMW Brass Knuckles Tag Team Championship.
Strongest Tag League	April 20, 1999–May 5, 1999	The continuity and conclusion of the Brass Knuckles Tag Team Championship round-robin tournament.
Making of a New Legend	June 13, 1999–June 21, 1999	The dismissal of the Hayabusa character and build-up to his farewell.
Goodbye Hayabusa	July 18, 1999–July 31, 1999	The farewell of Hayabusa character and build-up to his new character.
Goodbye Hayabusa II	August 20, 1999–August 25, 1999	The tour featured the final matches of the Hayabusa character.
Making of a New Legend II	August 27, 1999–September 3, 1999	The debut of Hayabusa's new alter ego H.
Making of a New Legend III	September 16, 1999–September 24, 1999	The build-up to 10th Anniversary Show.
Making of a New Legend IV	October 18, 1999–October 29, 1999	The build-up to 10th Anniversary Show.
Making of a New Legend V	November 4, 1999–November 10, 1999	The build-up to 10th Anniversary Show.
Making of a New Legend VI	December 1, 1999–December 12, 1999	

=== 2000 ===
Name	Date	Notes
New Year Generation	January 5, 2000–January 16, 2000	The build-up to Backdraft.
Cluster Battle	February 14, 2000–February 25, 2000	The build-up to Backdraft.
Winning Road	March 27, 2000–April 11, 2000	The build-up to Backdraft.
Golden Series	April 28, 2000–May 5, 2000	The tour concluded with Backdraft.
Neo FMW	May 27, 2000–June 16, 2000	
King of Fight	June 21, 2000–June 26, 2000	
King of Fight II	July 13, 2000–July 30, 2000	
Super Dynamism	August 18, 2000–August 28, 2000	
Flashover	September 7, 2000–September 26, 2000	
Power Splash	October 7, 2000–October 29, 2000	
Scramble Survivor	November 11, 2000–November 25, 2000	
Year End Sensation	December 2, 2000–December 20, 2000	

=== 2001 ===
Name	Date	Notes
New Year Generation	January 7, 2001–January 16, 2001	
Cluster Battle	February 6, 2001–February 23, 2001	
Winning Road	March 4, 2001–March 13, 2001	
Fighting Creation	March 31, 2001–April 15, 2001	
Golden Series	April 29, 2001–May 3, 2001	The build-up to Kawasaki Legend.
Neo FMW	May 11, 2001–June 1, 2001	
King of Fight	June 8, 2001–June 30, 2001	
King of Fight II	July 2, 2001–July 20, 2001	
Super Dynamism	July 30, 2001–September 29, 2001	
Power Splash	October 5, 2001–October 22, 2001	
Scramble Survivor	November 5, 2001–November 25, 2001	

== Number of events by year ==
=== Supercards ===
- 1989 – 3
- 1990 – 6
- 1991 – 1
- 1992 – 2
- 1993 – 4
- 1994 – 3
- 1995 – 3
- 1996 – 4
- 1997 – 4
- 1998 – 1
- 1999 – 1
- 2000 – 8
- 2001 – 3

=== Pay-per-view events ===
- 1998 – 10
- 1999 – 13
- 2000 – 14
- 2001 – 21
- 2002 – 2

=== Tours ===
- 1995 – 1
- 1996 – 8
- 1997 – 13
- 1998 – 13
- 1999 – 12
- 2000 – 12
- 2001 – 11
- Total – 173
