= Goodbye Hayabusa II: Last Match =

- Promotion: Frontier Martial-Arts Wrestling
- Date: August 25, 1999
- City: Sapporo, Japan
- Venue: Nakajima Sports Center
- Attendance: 4,900

Pay-per-view chronology
← Previous; Goodbye Hayabusa II: Hayabusa Graduation Ceremony	Next → Making of a New Legend III: Day 6

Goodbye Hayabusa II: Last Match was a professional wrestling pay-per-view (PPV) event produced by Frontier Martial-Arts Wrestling (FMW). The event took place on August 25, 1999, at the Nakajima Sports Center in Sapporo, Japan. The pay-per-view was the last event in the Goodbye Hayabusa tour used to retire Eiji Ezaki's "Hayabusa" character and to showcase the character's final matches. The tour was used as a build-up to Hayabusa's new character "H", which was tested during Darkside Hayabusa's revival at Haunted House and Ezaki would debut his H character on August 27.

The event was notable for featuring the final defenses of the FMW Brass Knuckles Heavyweight Championship and the FMW Independent Heavyweight Championship. Masato Tanaka retained the Independent Heavyweight Championship against Yukihiro Kanemura and Hayabusa retained the Brass Knuckles Heavyweight Championship against his arch rival Mr. Gannosuke in the main event of Last Match, which was the last match of the "Hayabusa" character.

== Results ==
No.	Results	Stipulations	Times
1	Super Leather and Chris Youngblood defeated Ricky Fuji and Naohiko Yamazaki	Tag team match	8:54
2	Kaori Nakayama defeated Emi Motokawa	Singles match	5:41
3	Jado defeated Flying Kid Ichihara (with Sena Wakana)	Singles match	6:26
4	Giant Steele defeated Hido	Singles match	3:48
5	Team No Respect (Kodo Fuyuki, Koji Nakagawa and Gedo) (c) defeated Tetsuhiro Kuroda, Hisakatsu Oya and Yoshinori Sasaki	Six-man tag team match for the WEW 6-Man Tag Team Championship	12:41
6	Masato Tanaka (c) defeated Yukihiro Kanemura	Singles match for the FMW Independent Heavyweight Championship	13:42
7	Hayabusa (c) defeated Mr. Gannosuke	Singles match for the FMW Brass Knuckles Heavyweight Championship	18:28
(c) / – the champion(s) heading into the match
