= Goodbye Hayabusa =

Professional wrestling events in Japan

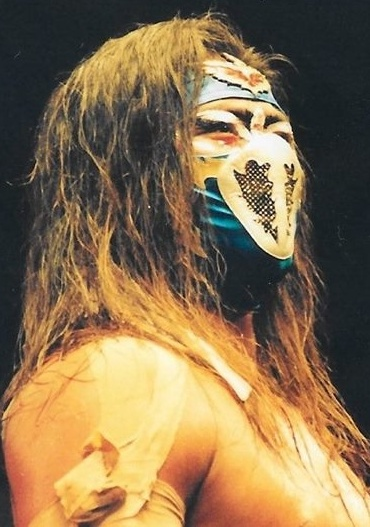
- The entire tour centered around the farewell to the Hayabusa character, which was FMW's ace at the time.
- Promotion: Frontier Martial-Arts Wrestling
- Date: July 18, 1999–August 25, 1999
- Attendance: 20,730 (combined)

Goodbye Hayabusa was the name of two professional wrestling series of events produced by Frontier Martial-Arts Wrestling (FMW) in 1999. The backstory of the series was that on-screen FMW Commissioner Kodo Fuyuki decided to end Eiji Ezaki's "Hayabusa" character after August 25, 1999 and the tour consisted of farewell matches of Ezaki's Hayabusa character and the end of it. The first part of the event took place between July 18 and July 31, 1999 and the second part of the event took place between August 20 and August 25, 1999. The series also introduced the WEW 6-Man Tag Team Championship, a substitute for the FMW World Street Fight 6-Man Tag Team Championship, which had been retired and awarded to the departing Atsushi Onita by FMW President Shoichi Arai on November 20, 1998 for establishing FMW and taking it to a huge level.

== Dates, venues and main events ==
=== Goodbye Hayabusa I ===
Show:	Date:	Venue:	City:	Main event:
Day 1	July 18, 1999	Osaka Municipal East Gymnasium	Osaka	Hayabusa, Masato Tanaka and Tetsuhiro Kuroda vs. Team Respect No (Kodo Fuyuki, Koji Nakagawa and Gedo)
Day 2	July 19, 1999	Gifu Industrial Gymnasium	Gifu	Hayabusa, Masato Tanaka and Tetsuhiro Kuroda vs. Super Leather, Armageddon #1 and Armageddon #2
Day 3	July 20, 1999	Toyohashi City Gymnasium	Toyohashi	Mr. Gannosuke, Yukihiro Kanemura and Jado vs. Super Leather, Armageddon #1 and Armageddon #2
Day 4	July 24, 1999	Kaseda City Gymnasium	Kaseda	Mr. Gannosuke and Yukihiro Kanemura vs. Hayabusa and Hisakatsu Oya
Day 5	July 25, 1999	Kushira Peaceful Arena	Kushira	Mr. Gannosuke, Yukihiro Kanemura and Jado vs. Team Respect No (Kodo Fuyuki, Koji Nakagawa and Gedo)
Day 6	July 29, 1999	Takamatsu City Gymnasium	Takamatsu	Hayabusa, Masato Tanaka and Tetsuhiro Kuroda vs. Mr. Gannosuke, Yukihiro Kanemura and Jado
Pay-per-view	July 31, 1999	Korakuen Hall	Tokyo	Hayabusa, Masato Tanaka and Tetsuhiro Kuroda vs. Team Respect No (Kodo Fuyuki, Koji Nakagawa and Gedo)

=== Goodbye Hayabusa: II ===
Show:	Date:	Venue:	City:	Main event:
Haunted House	August 20, 1999	Korakuen Hall	Tokyo	Masato Tanaka vs. Mr. Gannosuke (c) for the FMW Independent Heavyweight Championship
Hayabusa Graduation Ceremony	August 23, 1999	Korakuen Hall	Tokyo	Hayabusa vs. Yukihiro Kanemura (c) for the FMW Brass Knuckles Heavyweight Championship
Last Match	August 25, 1999	Nakajima Sports Center	Sapporo	Hayabusa (c) vs. Mr. Gannosuke for the FMW Brass Knuckles Heavyweight Championship with special guest referee Kodo Fuyuki

== Background ==
On May 5, 1999, Team No Respect reunited when they helped Kodo Fuyuki in retaining the FMW Double Championship against Tetsuhiro Kuroda. After the match, Fuyuki revealed that he had become the new Commissioner of FMW as he had goaded FMW President Shoichi Arai into giving him the position. On May 18, Fuyuki separated the Double Championship by awarding the FMW Brass Knuckles Heavyweight Championship and the FMW Independent Heavyweight Championship to his Team No Respect teammates Yukihiro Kanemura and Mr. Gannosuke respectively. On June 15, Fuyuki decided to end the Hayabusa character and announced that Eiji Ezaki would not be allowed to compete with the mask or under the "Hayabusa" character after August 25. Later at the event, the FMW team of Hayabusa, Masato Tanaka and Tetsuhiro Kuroda defeated Mr. Gannosuke, Yukihiro Kanemura and Hido in a ladder match which stipulated that Fuyuki would have to eat dog food if TNR lost. Fuyuki chewed it and then spit it in Hayabusa's face and a brawl took place between TNR and FMW wrestlers. On June 23, Hayabusa met Arai to null Fuyuki's decision of ending the Hayabusa character but Arai said that the decision stood. The legitimate reason of ending the gimmick was that Ezaki had suffered many injuries throughout the past few years and he was unable to do high-flying in the ring and he needed to change his wrestling style to mat wrestling, so he needed a character change. A series of events took place to feature farewell matches of the "Hayabusa" character titled Goodbye Hayabusa from July to August 1999.

On July 2, Kodo Fuyuki announced the formation of a new WEW 6-Man Tag Team Championship and four teams were selected to compete in a tournament to crown the inaugural champions and the tournament would take place throughout the Goodbye Hayabusa tour. The four teams were Fuyuki, Koji Nakagawa and Gedo, the team of Mr. Gannosuke, Yukihiro Kanemura and Jado, the team of Hayabusa, Masato Tanaka and Tetsuhiro Kuroda and the team of Super Leather, Armageddon #1 and Armageddon #2. The first match took place on the first show of the Goodbye Hayabusa tour on July 18, in which the team of Hayabusa, Tanaka and Kuroda fought Fuyuki, Nakagawa and Gedo to a thirty-minute time limit draw. Super Leather and Armageddon defeated Hayabusa, Tanaka and Kuroda to gain two points. Super Leather and Armageddon lost to both TNR teams and then both TNR teams competed in a match, which Fuyuki, Nakagawa and Gedo won. This gave them the advantage and they qualified for the final. On July 29, Hayabusa, Tanaka and Kuroda fought Gannosuke, Kanemura and Jado to a time limit draw, giving the advantage to the latter team and they qualified for the semi-final. The teams of Hayabusa, Tanaka and Kuroda and Super Leather and Armageddon would compete in a decision match on the July 31 show airing on pay-per-view.

== July 31 pay-per-view ==
Goodbye Hayabusa: Day 7
- Promotion: Frontier Martial-Arts Wrestling
- Date: July 31, 1999
- City: Tokyo, Japan
- Venue: Korakuen Hall
- Attendance: 2,150

Pay-per-view chronology
← Previous; Making of a New Legend: Day 2	Next → Goodbye Hayabusa II: Hayabusa Graduation Ceremony

The seventh show of the "Goodbye Hayabusa" tour aired live on pay-per-view via DirecTV. The event took place on July 31, 1999 at the Korakuen Hall in Tokyo, Japan. The event featured matches of a round-robin tournament contested for the new WEW 6-Man Tag Team Championship, in which the team of Hayabusa, Masato Tanaka and Tetsuhiro Kuroda qualified for the final by defeating the team of Super Leather, Armageddon #1 and Armageddon #2 and the team of Jado, Mr. Gannosuke and Yukihiro Kanemura and then faced the team of Kodo Fuyuki, Koji Nakagawa and Gedo in the final. Fuyuki, Nakagawa and Gedo became the inaugural 6-Man Tag Team Champions when Fuyuki performed a Lariat on Hayabusa.

=== Preliminary matches ===
Yoshinori Sasaki defeated Naohiko Yamazaki in the opening match by performing a Nodowa Otoshi. Flying Kid Ichihara got a disqualification victory against Team No Respect member Hido. Hisakatsu Oya defeated Hiroshi Usumi with an octopus hold and then called Kodo Fuyuki out to the ring and as Fuyuki came, Oya removed his wig to reveal his bald head. The next match was a decision match in the WEW 6-Man Tag Team Championship tournament pitting Hayabusa, Masato Tanaka and Tetsuhiro Kuroda against Super Leather, Armageddon #1 and Armageddon #2. Hayabusa performed a Firebird Splash on Leather to win the match and to qualify for the semi-final match against Jado, Mr. Gannosuke and Yukihiro Kanemura. Hayabusa slapped Jado and rolled him up to qualify for the final.

=== Main event match ===
Hayabusa, Masato Tanaka and Tetsuhiro Kuroda took on Kodo Fuyuki, Koji Nakagawa and Gedo in the final of the WEW 6-Man Tag Team Championship tournament as Fuyuki's team got the advantage by topping the round-robin stage. After a back and forth match, Fuyuki performed a running lariat on Hayabusa to win the title.

=== Results ===
No.	Results	Stipulations	Times
1	Yoshinori Sasaki defeated Naohiko Yamazaki	Singles match	9:53
2	Flying Kid Ichihara defeated Hido via disqualification	Singles match	3:07
3	Hisakatsu Oya defeated Hiroshi Usumi via submission	Singles match	3:46
4	Hayabusa, Masato Tanaka and Tetsuhiro Kuroda defeated Super Leather and Armageddon (#1 and #2)	WEW 6-Man Tag Team Championship tournament decision match	4:03
5	Hayabusa, Masato Tanaka and Tetsuhiro Kuroda defeated Team No Respect (Jado, Mr. Gannosuke and Yukihiro Kanemura)	WEW 6-Man Tag Team Championship tournament semi-final match	20:55
6	Team No Respect (Kodo Fuyuki, Koji Nakagawa and Gedo) defeated Hayabusa, Masato Tanaka and Tetsuhiro Kuroda	WEW 6-Man Tag Team Championship tournament final match	10:21

=== Tournament brackets ===
Round-robin stage

Team	Points
Kodo Fuyuki, Koji Nakagawa and Gedo	5
Mr. Gannosuke, Yukihiro Kanemura and Jado	3
Hayabusa, Masato Tanaka and Tetsuhiro Kuroda	2
Super Leather and Armageddon (#1 and #2)	2

Knockout stage

Decision
Hayabusa, Masato Tanaka and Tetsuhiro Kuroda	Pin
Super Leather, Armageddon #1 and Armageddon #2	4:03
Mr. Gannosuke, Yukihiro Kanemura and Jado
BYE
Kodo Fuyuki, Koji Nakagawa and Gedo
BYE

Semi-Finals
Hayabusa, Masato Tanaka and Tetsuhiro Kuroda	Pin
Mr. Gannosuke, Yukihiro Kanemura and Jado	20:55
Kodo Fuyuki, Koji Nakagawa and Gedo
BYE

Final
Hayabusa, Masato Tanaka and Tetsuhiro Kuroda	Pin
Kodo Fuyuki, Koji Nakagawa and Gedo	10:20

== Goodbye Hayabusa II ==
Three more events were conducted as farewell to the "Hayabusa" character following the July tour in August 1999 as a continuation of the "Goodbye Hayabusa" series. The three events concluded with the end of Hayabusa's character. The first event Haunted House took place on August 20 at the Korakuen Hall in Tokyo, Japan. At the event, Hayabusa unleashed his "darkside" for the final time and the event was headlined by Masato Tanaka beating Mr. Gannosuke for the FMW Independent Heavyweight Championship. The second event Hayabusa Graduation Ceremony aired as a pay-per-view event on August 23 at the Korakuen Hall and the departing character of Hayabusa defeated Yukihiro Kanemura in the main event to win the FMW Brass Knuckles Heavyweight Championship. The final event in the series was the Last Match, also airing on pay-per-view and taking place on August 25 at Nakajima Sports Center in Sapporo. Masato Tanaka retained the Independent Heavyweight Championship against Yukihiro Kanemura and Hayabusa retained the Brass Knuckles Heavyweight Championship in his last match under the gimmick against frequent rival Mr. Gannosuke in the main event of the show.

== Aftermath ==
Kodo Fuyuki deactivated the Brass Knuckles Heavyweight Championship and the Independent Heavyweight Championship and created the WEW Single Championship in place of the double titles. After the retirement of the "Hayabusa" character, Eiji Ezaki announced that he would begin competing as "H". H was an unmasked cool dude wearing jeans and shirts and was completely different than the serious Hayabusa. He debuted the character on August 27 and continued his war with Team No Respect but the character failed to get over with the fans and attendance declined, forcing FMW to revive the Hayabusa character on July 23, 2000.
