= Goodbye Hayabusa II: Hayabusa Graduation Ceremony =

Goodbye Hayabusa II: Graduation Ceremony
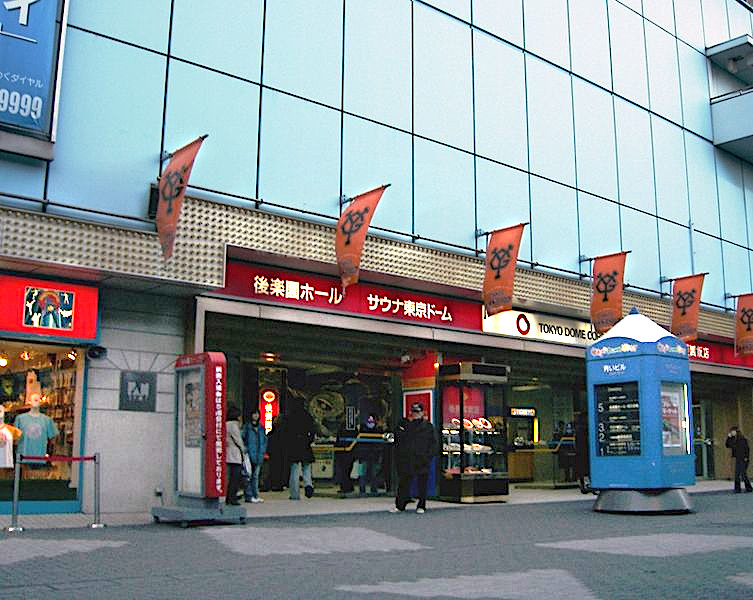
- Korakuen Hall
- Promotion: Frontier Martial-Arts Wrestling
- Date: Taping date: August 23, 1999; Broadcast: August 25, 1999
- City: Tokyo, Japan
- Venue: Korakuen Hall
- Attendance: 2,150

Pay-per-view chronology
← Previous; Goodbye Hayabusa: Day 7	Next → Goodbye Hayabusa II: Last Match

Goodbye Hayabusa II: Hayabusa Graduation Ceremony was a professional wrestling pay-per-view (PPV) event produced by Frontier Martial-Arts Wrestling (FMW). The event was taped on August 23, 1999 and aired on pay-per-view via broadcast delay on DirecTV on August 25. This event was a part of the Goodbye Hayabusa tour used as build-up to the retirement of Eiji Ezaki's "Hayabusa" character and switch to a new character.

In the main event of the show, Hayabusa defeated Yukihiro Kanemura to win the FMW Brass Knuckles Heavyweight Championship. The event also featured the in-ring debut of Giant Steele, who debuted at Haunted House to assist Shoichi Arai in defeating Ricky Fuji.

== Background ==
Eiji Ezaki was forced by FMW Commissioner Kodo Fuyuki to end his "Hayabusa" character on August 25 and Ezaki planned three major shows with Shoichi Arai as farewell to Hayabusa and build-up to his character change. At Goodbye Hayabusa II: Haunted House, Hayabusa unleashed his Darkside for the very last time in a six-man tag team match, which Darkside Hayabusa's team won. Hayabusa would be scheduled to challenge for the promotion's top title, the FMW Brass Knuckles Heavyweight Championship at the Hayabusa Graduation Ceremony pay-per-view.

Jado defeated Flying Kid Ichihara at Haunted House in a match which stipulated that Ichihara's valet Sena Wakana must remove her clothes if Jado won. Jado would win and Wakana undressed her clothes to reveal her undergarments beneath. Jado would be scheduled to team with Mr. Gannosuke against Ichihara and Naohiko Yamazaki in a match at Hayabusa Graduation Ceremony, in which Jado put a stipulation that Wakana must strip off her undergarments to show her naked body.

== Results ==
No.	Results	Stipulations	Times
1	Mr. Gannosuke and Jado defeated Flying Kid Ichihara and Naohiko Yamazaki via submission	Tag team match	5:18
2	Kaori Nakayama defeated Emi Motokawa	Singles match	9:41
3	Giant Steele defeated Yoshinori Sasaki	Singles match	0:48
4	Masato Tanaka and Ricky Fuji defeated Kodo Fuyuki and Shoichi Arai	Tag team match	7:15
5	Tetsuhiro Kuroda and Hisakatsu Oya defeated Koji Nakagawa and Gedo (c)	Tag team match for the WEW World Tag Team Championship	18:52
6	Hayabusa defeated Yukihiro Kanemura (c)	Singles match for the FMW Brass Knuckles Heavyweight Championship	18:28
(c) / – the champion(s) heading into the match
