= FMW Deep Throat =

Professional wrestling event

Deep Throat
- Promotion: Frontier Martial-Arts Wrestling
- Date: November 12, 2000
- City: Yokohama, Kanagawa, Japan
- Venue: Bunka Gym
- Attendance: 2,500

Pay-per-view chronology
← Previous; Power Splash 2000: Day 11	Next → Scramble Survivor 2000: Day 8

Deep Throat was a professional wrestling pay-per-view (PPV) event produced by Frontier Martial-Arts Wrestling (FMW). The event took place on November 12, 2000 at the Bunka Gym in Yokohama, Kanagawa, Japan.

Ten matches were contested at the event. In the main event, Kodo Fuyuki successfully defended the WEW World Heavyweight Championship against Hayabusa with a running lariat. Hayabusa would take a hiatus after the match due to injury and announced that he would return to FMW at 12th Anniversary Show. In other major matches, Tetsuhiro Kuroda defeated Mr. Gannosuke in a match, which stipulated that Gannosuke must retire if he lost and Kintaro Kanemura successfully defended the WEW Hardcore Championship against Masato Tanaka.

== Reception ==
Stuart of Puroresu Central gave negative reviews to the event, with "It turned into a good show after the awful match with XPW scrubs involved, but the sheer quantity of junk before that really damages the show as a whole. Looking past that stuff, the good part not only had the better wrestler, but maybe coincidentally, maybe not, had better booked angles than some of the bush league crap on the undercard. GOEMON vs. Onryo is goofy in theory, but I dug the uniqueness of it. Gannosuke vs. Kuroda was one mans fight to save FMW from the evil of show puroresu (sports-entertainment), although he failed and got retired (for now). Kanemura vs. Tanaka had no real storyline in the modern FMW sense that I picked up on, it was just a war between two old rivals, who turned the clock back a few years and left the current era for just under 18 minutes. And the main event concluded, for now, the ongoing saga between Hayabusa and Fuyuki, with Fuyuki hinting at a full babyface turn at the end, especially with Kuroda turning heel. Even though those were better booked than the undercard stuff, the constant turns, swerves and what have you seemed to jade many fans, which probably contributed to the bad attendance."

== Results ==
No.	Results	Stipulations	Times
1	Ricky Fuji defeated Chocoball Mukai	Singles match	7:06
2	Flying Kid Ichihara defeated Shinjuku Shark	Singles match	8:02
3	Jado, Gedo and Kaori Nakayama (c) defeated Brad Elliot, Damien Blade and Pat Tanaka	Six-person intergender tag team match for the WEW 6-Man Tag Team Championship	11:33
4	Kyoko Inoue defeated Naohiro Yamazaki	Singles match	7:54
5	Hisakatsu Oya defeated Azusa Kudo and Emi Motokawa	Handicap match	8:32
6	Hideki Hosaka and Mammoth Sasaki defeated Supreme and Homeless Jimmy (c)	Tag team match for the WEW Hardcore Tag Team Championship	12:57
7	Onryo defeated GOEMON	Singles match	10:44
8	Tetsuhiro Kuroda defeated Mr. Gannosuke	Singles match; if Gannosuke lost, he must retire from professional wrestling	12:44
9	Kintaro Kanemura (c) defeated Masato Tanaka	Singles match for the WEW Hardcore Championship	17:46
10	Kodo Fuyuki (c) defeated Hayabusa	Singles match for the WEW World Heavyweight Championship	21:29
(c) / – the champion(s) heading into the match
