= List of Frontier Martial-Arts Wrestling tournaments =

Professional Wrestling Tournaments (1989-2001)

Frontier Martial-Arts Wrestling held a variety of professional wrestling tournaments competed for by wrestlers that were part of their roster during its existence between 1989 and 2001.

== Sporadic tournaments ==
=== Battle Resistance Open Tournament ===
Battle Resistance - 1st Open Tournament
- Promotion: Frontier Martial-Arts Wrestling
- Date: January 7, 1990
- City: Tokyo, Japan
- Venue: Korakuen Hall
- Attendance: 2,450

Event chronology
← Previous; Battle Creation	Next → Battle Brave in Korakuen

FMW's first tournament, a single-elimination tournament took place at the Battle Resistance - 1st Open Tournament event on January 7, 1990. Aside from the tournament, the event also featured a women's wrestling match between Miwa Sato and Kumiko Matsuda.

First Round
Masanobu Kurisu	Pin
Jang Yong Wow	4:38
Mitsuhiro Matsunaga	DQ
Katsuji Ueda	3:21
Sambo Asako	DQ
Rick Wonshu	6:29
Tarzan Goto	Pin
Satoshi Imaizumi	4:14
Atsushi Onita	Pin
The Shooter	3:57
Beast the Barbarian
BYE

Quarterfinals
Masanobu Kurisu	Count-out
Mitsuhiro Matsunaga	4:14
BYE
BYE
Tarzan Goto	Pin
Sambo Asako	6:14
Atsushi Onita	Pin
Beast the Barbarian	4:56

Semifinals
Masanobu Kurisu
BYE
Tarzan Goto	Pin
Atsushi Onita	3:52

Finals
Masanobu Kurisu	Referee stoppage
Tarzan Goto	7:58

Non-tournament match

No.	Results	Stipulations	Times
1	Kumiko Matsuda defeated Miwa Sato	Singles match	2:41

=== AWA World Light Heavyweight Championship Tournament ===
A six-man tournament was set up for the vacant AWA World Light Heavyweight Championship on September 25, 1990 after previous champion Lee Gak-soo left FMW earlier that month. Katsuji Ueda defeated Jimmy Backlund in the tournament final to win the vacant title.

Quarterfinals
Ricky Fuji	Pin
Jang Yong Wow	3:20
Katsuji Ueda	Pin
The Shooter	3:39
Jimmy Backlund	Pin
Kim Hyun Hwan	2:23

Semifinals
Ricky Fuji	6:44
Katsuji Ueda	Pin
Jimmy Backlund
BYE

Final
Katsuji Ueda	Pin
Jimmy Backlund	15:25

=== FMW Tag Team Tournament ===
The FMW Tag Team Tournament was a six-team tournament held by FMW from January 6 to January 15, 1991. The opening round was a round-robin tournament in which five teams scored 3 points to qualify for the knockout format to determine the winner, while the team of Lee Gak-soo and Nam Sung Gun was the only team which failed to qualify as they lost all of their matches and scored 0 points. The knockout format took place on January 15, 1991.

Round-robin stage

Team	Points
Boris Gogichashivili and Grigory Verichev	3
Ricky Fuji and Tarzan Goto	3
Mr. Pogo and The Gladiator	3
Atsushi Onita and Sambo Asako	3
Jimmy Backlund and The Shooter	3
Lee Gak-soo and Nam Sung Gun	0

Knockout stage

Quarterfinals
Boris Gogichashivili and Grigory Verichev	Pin
Jimmy Backlund and The Shooter	6:57
Mr. Pogo and The Gladiator
BYE
Atsushi Onita and Sambo Asako	Pin
Ricky Fuji and Tarzan Goto	12:47

Semifinals
Boris Gogichashivili and Grigory Verichev	Pin
Mr. Pogo and The Gladiator	4:51
Atsushi Onita and Sambo Asako
BYE

Final
Mr. Pogo and The Gladiator	Pin
Atsushi Onita and Sambo Asako	9:13

=== Barbed Wire Deathmatch Tournament ===
The Barbed Wire Deathmatch Tournament was a single-elimination tournament in which all matches were no rope barbed wire deathmatches. The tournament took place on August 17, 1991.

Quarterfinals
Atsushi Onita	Pin
Jimmy Backlund	3:31
Ricky Fuji	Pin
Mark Starr	4:58
The Gladiator	Pin
Horace Boulder	4:53
Sambo Asako
BYE

Semifinals
Atsushi Onita	Forfeit
Ricky Fuji
The Gladiator	Pin
Sambo Asako	6:01

Final
Atsushi Onita	KO
Sambo Asako	9:51

=== World's Strongest Tag Team Tournament ===
World's Strongest Tag Team Tournament was a ten-team tag team tournament conducted from November 20 to December 9, 1991 to determine the inaugural WWA World Martial Arts Tag Team Champions. The first stage was round robin and the second stage was contested in knockout format after one team topped the round robin format while two teams tied with 7 points and they had a playoff match to take on the topping team in the final round.

Round-robin stage

Team	Points
Grigory Verichev and Koba Kurtanidze	9
Atsushi Onita and Tarzan Goto	7
Ricky Fuji and Sambo Asako	7
The Gladiator and Big Titan	6
Leon Spinks and Rufus Blackborn	6
Sabu and The Sheik	5
Horace Boulder and Mark Starr	3
Calypso Jim and Katsuji Ueda	3
Los Mercenarios Americanos (Mercenario I and Mercenario II)	1
Chong Summusu and Kim Shunki	0

Knockout stage

Play-off
December 9
Ricky Fuji and Sambo Asako	Pin
Atsushi Onita and Tarzan Goto	9:09
Final
December 9
Grigory Verichev and Koba Kurtanidze	Pin
Atsushi Onita and Tarzan Goto	11:34

=== FMW Women's Tag Team Tournament ===
The FMW Women's Tag Team Tournament was a round-robin tag team tournament between female wrestlers of the promotion that took place between June 16 and June 28, 1992.

Team	Points
Eriko Tsuchiya and Yoshika Maedomari	4
Megumi Kudo and Rie Nakamura	2
Combat Toyoda and Keiko Iwami	2
Miwa Sato and Yukie Nabeno	1
Yuki Morimatsu and Kumiko Matsuda	1

Final
Eriko Tsuchiya and Yoshika Maedomari	Pin
Megumi Kudo and Rie Nakamura	14:40

=== Street Fight Tag Team Tournament ===
The Street Fight Tag Team Tournament was a tag team tournament which took place between November 20 and December 7, 1992. Every match in the tournament was a street fight. The first stage was a round-robin stage in which the three top scoring teams qualified for the knockout stage while the team of Atsushi Onita and Grigory Verichev defeated Dr. Luther and Dr. Hannibal in a playoff to qualify for the knockout as both teams were tied at 4 points.

Round-robin stage

Team	Points
Tarzan Goto and Big Titan	8
Tiger Jeet Singh, Sr. and Tiger Jeet Singh, Jr.	6
Horace Boulder and The Gladiator	5
Atsushi Onita and Grigory Verichev	4
Dr. Luther and Dr. Hannibal	4
Haystacks Calhoun Jr. and Sambo Asako	3
Sabu and Kareem Sudan	3
The Alligators (Alligator Man #1 and Alligator Man #2)	2
The Psychos (Psycho #1 and Psycho #2)	1

Knockout stage

Playoff
Atsushi Onita and Grigory Verichev	Pin
Dr. Luther and Dr. Hannibal	5:27

Semifinals
Atsushi Onita and Grigory Verichev	Pin
Tiger Jeet Singh, Sr. and Tiger Jeet Singh, Jr.	8:18
Tarzan Goto and Big Titan	Pin
The Gladiator and Horace Boulder	6:50

Final
Atsushi Onita and Grigory Verichev	Pin
Tarzan Goto and Big Titan	10:48

=== FMW Independent World Junior Heavyweight Championship Tournament ===
The Independent Junior Heavyweight Tournament was a round-robin tournament to crown the first FMW Independent World Junior Heavyweight Champion. The tournament was held between September 17 and September 27, 1993. The Great Sasuke was given a bye in the tournament and the winner of the tournament would face him for the title on October 28.

First Round
Block A September 17
Koji Nakagawa	Pin
Eiji Ezaki	10:12
Block A September 22
Battle Ranger Z	Pin
The American	9:42
Block B September 18
Atsushi Onita, Jr.	Pin
Ricky Fuji	10:31
Block B September 23
Damian	Pin
Bull Rider	7:58
The Great Sasuke
BYE
BYE
BYE
BYE
BYE
BYE
BYE

Semi-Final
Block A September 25
Eiji Ezaki^{1}	Pin
Battle Ranger Z	9:57
Block B September 26
Atsushi Onita, Jr.	Pin
Damian	8:11
The Great Sasuke
BYE
BYE
BYE

Final
September 27
Battle Ranger Z	Pin
Damian	18:24
The Great Sasuke
BYE

Title Match
October 28
Battle Ranger Z^{2}	Pin
The Great Sasuke

^1Nakagawa suffered an arm injury, so Ezaki advanced to the semi-final.

^2Damian was unable to compete and was replaced by Battle Ranger Z to face Sasuke for the title.

=== WWA World Women's Championship #1 Contender's Tournament ===
A tournament was held in October 1993 to determine the #1 contender to the WWA World Women's Championship held by Combat Toyoda. The four-woman tournament was first conducted in a round robin format and the top two females competed in the final round on October 28, 1993. Crusher Maedomari won the tournament and defeated Toyoda to win the title on October 31.

Round-robin stage

Team	Points
Shark Tsuchiya	5
Crusher Maedomari	4
Miwa Sato	2
Yukie Nabeno	2

Knockout stage

Final
Shark Tsuchiya	Pin
Crusher Maedomari	9:28

=== FMW Brass Knuckles Tag Team Championship Tournament (1994) ===
A double-elimination tournament was held to crown the new FMW Brass Knuckles Tag Team Champions after the WWA version of the title was retired in 1992. The tournament was held between January 7, 1994 and January 18, 1994. The losing teams competed in Block B and the winners of Block B faced the winners of Block A in the tournament final on January 18. All the matches in the tournament were either street fights or deathmatches.

Block A

Quarter-Final
Big Titan and The Gladiator	Pin
Hideki Hosaka and Hisakatsu Oya	13:24
Jinsei Shinzaki and Masaru Toi	Pin
Ricky Fuji and Terry Simms	16:46
Mr. Gannosuke and Tarzan Goto	KO
Sabu and Damian	14:39
Mr. Pogo and Goro Tsurumi	Pin
Atsushi Onita and Katsutoshi Niiyama	16:15

Semi-Final
Big Titan and The Gladiator	Pin
Jinsei Shinzaki and Masaru Toi	15:13
Mr. Gannosuke and Tarzan Goto	Pin
Mr. Pogo and Goro Tsurumi	15:57

Final
Big Titan and The Gladiator	Pin
Mr. Gannosuke and Tarzan Goto	12:46

Loser's Block B

First Round
Hideki Hosaka and Hisakatsu Oya	Pin
Ricky Fuji and Terry Simms	13:42
Loser of Block A Second Semifinal
BYE
Sabu and Damian	Pin
Atsushi Onita and Katsutoshi Niiyama	13:45
Loser of Block A First Semifinal
BYE

Second Round
Hideki Hosaka and Hisakatsu Oya	Pin
Mr. Pogo and Goro Tsurumi	5:11
Atsushi Onita and Katsutoshi Niiyama	Pin
Jinsei Shinzaki and Masaru Toi	8:19

Semi-Final
Mr. Pogo and Goro Tsurumi	Pin
Atsushi Onita and Katsutoshi Niiyama	13:00
Final
Atsushi Onita and Katsutoshi Niiyama	Pin
Mr. Gannosuke and Tarzan Goto	13:17

Tournament Final
Big Titan and The Gladiator	Pin
Atsushi Onita and Katsutoshi Niiyama	13:20

=== FMW Independent Women's / WWA World Women's Championship Tournament ===
A tournament was held for the vacant FMW Independent Women's / WWA World Women's Championship after champion Crusher Maedomari vacated the title to participate in the tournament. The tournament was held between February 11 and February 25, 1994.

Quarter-Final
Block A February 11
Megumi Kudo	Pin
Malia Hosaka	8:33
Block A
Crusher Maedomari
BYE
Block A February 12
Lola González	Pin
Miwa Sato	10:59
BYE
BYE
Block A February 13
Bambi	Pin
Yukie Nabeno	9:09
BYE
BYE
Block B February 15
Combat Toyoda	Pin
Neftali	8:11
Block B
Leilani Kai
BYE

Semi-Final
Block A February 16
Megumi Kudo	Pin
Crusher Maedomari	15:39
Block A
Lola González
BYE
Block B February 17
Bambi	Pin
Crusher Maedomari	12:33
Block B February 18
Combat Toyoda	Pin
Leilani Kai	8:06

Final
Block A February 19
Megumi Kudo	Pin
Lola González	15:30
Block B February 21
Shark Tsuchiya*	Pin
Leilani Kai	8:09

Tournament Final
February 25
Megumi Kudo	Pin
Leilani Kai	13:50

- Shark Tsuchiya replaced Crusher Maedomari in the Block B final.

=== Six Man Tag Team Tournament ===
The Six Man Tag Team Tournament was a tournament held on March 13, 1994 in which all matches were six-man tag team matches.

Semi-Final
Damian, Sabu and The Sheik	Pin
Mr. Pogo, Goro Tsurumi and Hideki Hosaka	7:19
Atsushi Onita, Sambo Asako and Tarzan Goto	Pin
Big Titan, Ricky Fuji and The Gladiator	13:20

Final
Mr. Pogo, Goro Tsurumi and Hideki Hosaka	Pin
Atsushi Onita, Sambo Asako and Tarzan Goto	12:02

=== Young Spirit Tournament ===
The Young Spirit Tournament was a tournament consisting of young and rising stars of FMW who were representing the company's New Generation after Atsushi Onita retired from wrestling and left the company. The tournament was held to choose a rising star who could lead the company into the next generation. The tournament took place between July 18 and July 30, 1995. The finalists of the tournament were entered into the Grand Slam Tournament for the vacant FMW Brass Knuckles Heavyweight Championship.

Round-robin stage

Team	Points
W*ING Kanemura	8
Masato Tanaka	7
Hideki Hosaka	6
Hido	4
Koji Nakagawa	4
Tetsuhiro Kuroda	1

Knockout stage

Final
July 30
W*ING Kanemura	Pin
Masato Tanaka	12:47

=== Grand Slam Tournament ===
Grand Slam Tournament
- Location: Japan
- Start date: August 22, 1995
- End date: September 26, 1995
- Competitors: Hayabusa; Hisakatsu Oya; Katsutoshi Niiyama; Masato Tanaka; Mitsuhiro Matsunaga; Super Leather; The Gladiator; W*ING Kanemura

Champion
- The Gladiator

The Grand Slam Tournament was a round-robin tournament held to crown a new FMW Brass Knuckles Heavyweight Champion after the previous champion Hayabusa vacated the title due to injury. The tournament was held between August 22 and September 26, 1995.

Round-robin stage

Team	Points
The Gladiator	12
Hayabusa	11
Super Leather	10
Hisakatsu Oya	9
Mitsuhiro Matsunaga	8
Katsutoshi Niiyama	4
W*ING Kanemura	2
Masato Tanaka	0

Knockout stage

Final
September 26
The Gladiator	Pin
Hayabusa	23:38

=== FMW Independent Heavyweight Championship Tournament ===
The FMW Independent Heavyweight Championship Tournament was a tournament for the newly created FMW Independent Heavyweight Championship. The tournament took place between May 26 and August 1, 1996.

Quarter-Final
Masato Tanaka	Pin
Mr. Pogo	20:42
Super Leather	Pin
Hido	19:18
Hisakatsu Oya	Referee Stoppage
Horace Boulder	13:21
W*ING Kanemura	Pin
Koji Nakagawa	15:51

Semi-Final
Masato Tanaka	Pin
Hisakatsu Oya	20:31
W*ING Kanemura*	Pin
Super Leather	15:59

Final
W*ING Kanemura	Pin
Masato Tanaka	14:51

- This match was a Caribbean Barbed Wire Deathmatch.

=== FMW World Street Fight 6-Man Tag Team Championship Tournament ===
The FMW World Street Fight 6-Man Tag Team Championship Tournament was a tournament which took place on August 5, 1997 for the vacant FMW World Street Fight 6-Man Tag Team Championship after the title was vacated by Fuyuki-Gun (Kodo Fuyuki, Jado and Gedo).

Quarter-Final
The Great Kabuki, Keisuke Yamada and Daikokubo Benkei	Pin
Fuyuki-Gun (Kodo Fuyuki, Jado and Gedo)	16:19
Lioness Asuka, Shark Tsuchiya and Eagle Sawai
BYE
Hayabusa, Ricky Fuji and Koji Nakagawa	Pin
The Gladiator, Hisakatsu Oya and Mr. Gannosuke	14:59

Semi-Final
Fuyuki-Gun	Pin
Lioness Asuka, Shark Tsuchiya and Eagle Sawai	9:22
The Gladiator, Hisakatsu Oya and Mr. Gannosuke
BYE

Final
Fuyuki-Gun	Pin
The Gladiator, Hisakatsu Oya and Mr. Gannosuke	20:28

=== FMW Double Championship #1 Contender's Tournament ===
The FMW Double Championship #1 Contender's Tournament was a tournament to determine the #1 contender for Mr. Gannosuke's FMW Brass Knuckles Heavyweight Championship and FMW Independent Heavyweight Championship at FMW's first pay-per-view Entertainment Wrestling Live. The tournament was held between March 7 and March 17, 1998.

Quarterfinals
FMW TV	Hayabusa	Pin
3/13	Masato Tanaka	23:17
Live event	Tetsuhiro Kuroda	Pin
3/7	Jado	13:27
Live event	Koji Nakagawa	Pin
3/7	Yukihiro Kanemura	8:17
Live event	The Gladiator	Pin
3/8	Hisakatsu Oya	16:30

Semifinals
FMW TV	Hayabusa	Pin
3/16	Jado	17:15
FMW TV	Yukihiro Kanemura	Pin
3/16	The Gladiator	3:12

Final
FMW TV	Hayabusa	Pin
3/17	The Gladiator	14:09

=== Over the Top Tournament ===
The Over the Top Tournament was a tournament to determine the #1 contender for Kodo Fuyuki's FMW Brass Knuckles Heavyweight Championship and FMW Independent Heavyweight Championship on the March 19, 1999 pay-per-view. The event took place between December 9, 1998 and January 5, 1999. Fuyuki himself participated in the tournament to get a title shot in case he lost the title before the pay-per-view.

First Round
December 9, 1998
Hayabusa	Pin
Gedo	15:40
December 9, 1998
Kodo Fuyuki	Pin
Hisakatsu Oya	10:58
December 9, 1998
Muhammad Yone	Pin
Gosaku Goshogawara	9:36
December 9, 1998
Tetsuhiro Kuroda	Pin
Super Leather	14:49
ECW/FMW Supershow I
Hido	Pin
Takeshi Ono	5:46
ECW/FMW Supershow I
Masao Orihara	Pin
Ricky Fuji	6:00
ECW/FMW Supershow I
Yukihiro Kanemura	Pin
Hideki Hosaka	8:53
ECW/FMW Supershow I
Mr. Gannosuke	Pin
Koji Nakagawa	13:08

Quarter-Finals
ECW/FMW Supershow II
Hayabusa	Pin
Hisakatsu Oya	13:28
ECW/FMW Supershow II
Muhammad Yone	Pin
Tetsuhiro Kuroda	8:10
ECW/FMW Supershow II
Hido	Pin
Masao Orihara	5:33
ECW/FMW Supershow II
Yukihiro Kanemura	Pin
Mr. Gannosuke	10:53

Semi-Finals
ECW/FMW Supershow II
Hisakatsu Oya	Pin
Tetsuhiro Kuroda	13:42
ECW/FMW Supershow II
Hido	Pin
Mr. Gannosuke	2:22

Final
January 5, 1999
Hisakatsu Oya	Pin
Mr. Gannosuke	24:55

=== FMW Brass Knuckles Tag Team Championship Tournament (1999) ===
The FMW Brass Knuckles Tag Team Championship Tournament was held for the FMW Brass Knuckles Tag Team Championship after previous champions Hayabusa and Daisuke Ikeda vacated the titles due to Ikeda's health problems. This was an eight-team round-robin tournament taking place between March 20 and May 3, 1999.

Round-robin stage

Team	Points
Hayabusa and Kodo Fuyuki	13
Masato Tanaka and Tetsuhiro Kuroda	10
Koji Nakagawa and Gedo	10
Daisuke Ikeda and Muhammad Yone	9
Mr. Gannosuke and Hisakatsu Oya	8
Hideki Hosaka and Super Leather	2
Armageddon (#1 and #2)	2
Yukihiro Kanemura and Hido	0

Knockout stage

Play-off
May 3
Masato Tanaka and Tetsuhiro Kuroda	Pin
Koji Nakagawa and Gedo	2:04
Final
May 3
Masato Tanaka and Tetsuhiro Kuroda	Pin
Hayabusa and Kodo Fuyuki	24:54

=== WEW 6-Man Tag Team Championship Tournament ===
A tournament was set up for the newly created WEW 6-Man Tag Team Championship, which replaced FMW World Street Fight 6-Man Tag Team Championship in 1999. A four-team round-robin tournament took place between July 18 and July 31, 1999 during the Goodbye Hayabusa tour.

Round-robin stage

Team	Points
Kodo Fuyuki, Koji Nakagawa and Gedo	5
Mr. Gannosuke, Yukihiro Kanemura and Jado	3
Hayabusa, Masato Tanaka and Tetsuhiro Kuroda	2
Super Leather and Armageddon (#1 and #2)	2

Knockout stage

Decision
Hayabusa, Masato Tanaka and Tetsuhiro Kuroda	Pin
Super Leather, Armageddon #1 and Armageddon #2	4:03
Mr. Gannosuke, Yukihiro Kanemura and Jado
BYE
Kodo Fuyuki, Koji Nakagawa and Gedo
BYE

Semi-Finals
Hayabusa, Masato Tanaka and Tetsuhiro Kuroda	Pin
Mr. Gannosuke, Yukihiro Kanemura and Jado	20:55
Kodo Fuyuki, Koji Nakagawa and Gedo
BYE

Final
Hayabusa, Masato Tanaka and Tetsuhiro Kuroda	Pin
Kodo Fuyuki, Koji Nakagawa and Gedo	10:20

=== WEW Tag Team Championship Tournament ===
The WEW Tag Team Championship Tournament was held for the WEW Tag Team Championship on December 21, 2001 after previous champions Hayabusa and Tetsuhiro Kuroda were forced to vacate the title due to Hayabusa's injury.

Quarter-finals
Tetsuhiro Kuroda and Mr. Gannosuke	Pin
GOEMON and Onryo	10:26
Biomonster DNA and Leatherface	Pin
Sabu and Yoshihito Sasaki	10:58
Super Crazy and Crazy Boy	Pin
Mitsunobu Kikuzawa and NOSAWA	17:14
Kintaro Kanemura and Mammoth Sasaki	Pin
Balls Mahoney and Horace Boulder	14:25

Semi-finals
Tetsuhiro Kuroda and Mr. Gannosuke	Pin
Sabu and Yoshihito Sasaki	8:03
Super Crazy and Crazy Boy	Pin
Kintaro Kanemura and Mammoth Sasaki	11:32

Final
Tetsuhiro Kuroda and Mr. Gannosuke	Pin
Kintaro Kanemura and Mammoth Sasaki	16:38
