= Goodbye Hayabusa II: Haunted House =

Professional wrestling event

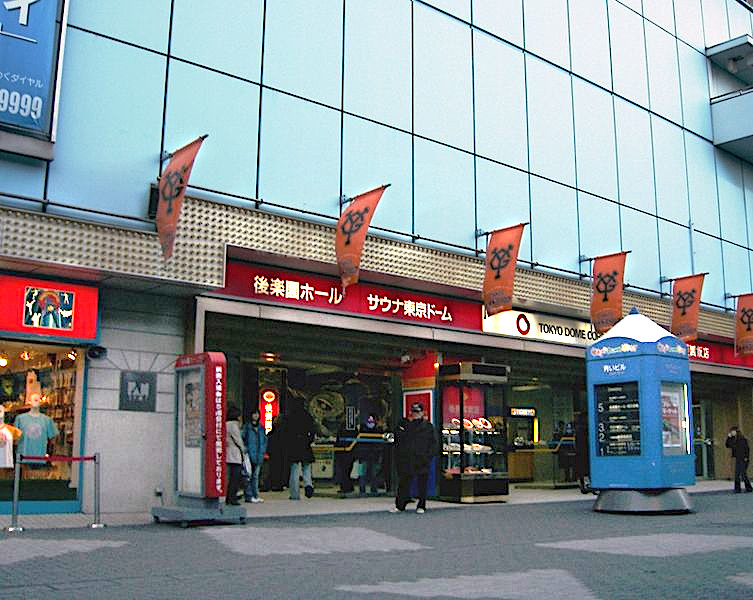
- Korakuen Hall
- Promotion: Frontier Martial-Arts Wrestling
- Date: August 20, 1999
- City: Tokyo, Japan
- Venue: Korakuen Hall
- Attendance: 2,100

Goodbye Hayabusa II: Haunted House was a professional wrestling live event produced by Frontier Martial-Arts Wrestling (FMW) as part of the Goodbye Hayabusa tour on August 20, 1999 at the Korakuen Hall in Tokyo, Japan. The tour would feature the end of the Hayabusa character in FMW.

The event was notable as Hayabusa unleashed his "darkside" for the last time before the retirement of the character as he teamed with Tetsuhiro Kuroda and Hisakatsu Oya against Koji Nakagawa, Yukihiro Kanemura and Hido, which Hayabusa's team won. In the main event, Masato Tanaka defeated Mr. Gannosuke to win the FMW Independent Heavyweight Championship with Kodo Fuyuki as the special guest referee.

== Background ==
FMW's ace Hayabusa was going through many injuries which were affecting him due to his high-flying style and he opted to change his wrestling style from high-flying to mat wrestling to risk the end of his career. Eiji Ezaki met FMW President Shoichi Arai to end the "Hayabusa" character and the Goodbye Hayabusa tour was built around the retirement of the character to develop a character change for Ezaki.

=== Storylines ===
On May 31, FMW Commissioner Kodo Fuyuki cut an in-ring segment with FMW President Shoichi Arai in which Fuyuki declared war on Masato Tanaka and announced that if Tanaka got pinned, he would be forced to leave FMW. Ricky Fuji interrupted him to protest on it but he was attacked by Fuyuki and Arai, which led to a match between Fuji and Arai at Haunted House. On June 15, Eiji Ezaki's retirement of "Hayabusa" was incorporated into a storyline in which Fuyuki announced that Ezaki would not be allowed to compete as Hayabusa after August 25. Tanaka joined forces with Hayabusa to feud with Team No Respect throughout the summer of 1999.

Flying Kid Ichihara had become a rival of Team No Respect after Kodo Fuyuki brought in porn star Sena Wakana in FMW but Wakana walked out on TNR by accompanying Ichihara during his match against TNR's Jado on June 15. Jado defeated Ichihara and then Wakana became Ichihara's valet. This led to a rematch between Jado and Ichihara at Haunted House.

== Event ==
=== Preliminary matches ===
In the opening match, Yoshinori Sasaki defeated Naohiko Yamazaki with a Chokeslam. Jado took on Flying Kid Ichihara in a match which stipulated that if Jado won, Ichihara's valet Sena Wakana must take off her dress. Jado applied a cloverleaf on Ichihara to win the match. As per pre-match stipulation, Wakana removed her dress to reveal her undergarments beneath. The team of Emi Motokawa and Kaori Nakayama defeated Tanny Mouse and Yuka Nakamura when Nakayama performed a fisherman suplex on Nakamura.

Ricky Fuji took on Shoichi Arai in a match in which Kodo Fuyuki served as the special guest referee. Arai put on a mask before the match and then switched places with Gedo, who nailed Fuji in the head with a stick and the debuting Giant Steele performed a Chokeslam on Fuji, allowing Arai to get the easy win over Fuji.

The Darkside Hayabusa, Hisakatsu Oya and Tetsuhiro Kuroda took on Hido, Koji Nakagawa and Yukihiro Kanemura. This would be the last match of the Darkside Hayabusa. During the match, Hayabusa tested the looks of his new "H" character by dying his hair orange and tattooing his chest. Bamboos were used as weapons in the match. Hayabusa spit mist into Hido and performed a Firebird Splash to win the match.

=== Main event match ===
Mr. Gannosuke defended the FMW Independent Heavyweight Championship against Masato Tanaka in his first title defense and Kodo Fuyuki inserted himself as the special guest referee. Fuyuki favored Gannosuke by making fast counts during Gannosuke's pinfall attempts on Tanaka. Tanaka attempted a Rolling Elbow on Gannosuke but Gannosuke moved out of the way and Fuyuki was accidentally knocked out with it. A substitute referee came in Fuyuki's place and Tanaka performed a Diamond Dust to win the title.

== Aftermath ==
The next event in the Goodbye Hayabusa tour was the "Hayabusa Graduation Ceremony" pay-per-view event which took place on August 23. During the event, Hayabusa defeated Yukihiro Kanemura to win the FMW Brass Knuckles Heavyweight Championship. Ricky Fuji gained his revenge on Shoichi Arai by pinning him in a tag team match at the event. On August 25, the "Last Match" pay-per-view event took place in which Masato Tanaka retained the FMW Independent Heavyweight Championship against Yukihiro Kanemura and Hayabusa retained the FMW Brass Knuckles Heavyweight Championship against Mr. Gannosuke in the last match of "Hayabusa" character. Both titles would be retired after the event and would be replaced by a WEW Single Championship.

After their win at Haunted House, Kaori Nakayama and Emi Motokawa competed against each other in matches at Hayabusa Graduation Ceremony and Last Match pay-per-views with Nakayama winning both matches.

After helping Shoichi Arai in beating Ricky Fuji at Haunted House, Giant Steele made his in-ring debut at Hayabusa Graduation Ceremony by defeating Yoshinori Sasaki in a quick match at Hayabusa Graduation Ceremony. Steele won a series of short matches before leaving the company just after a week.

At Hayabusa Graduation Ceremony, Mr. Gannosuke and Jado defeated Flying Kid Ichihara and Naohiko Yamazaki in a match which stipulated that Sena Wakana must remove her undergarments if Jado won. Wakana removed her undergarments to reveal another pair of undergarments. At Last Match, Jado defeated Ichihara in a match which stipulated that Wakana must strip off her all clothes to reveal her naked body and as Wakana was undressing herself, Jado stopped her as he did not want to see her naked.

Hayabusa debuted his "H" character on August 27 in an elimination tag team match, during which he re-injured Mr. Gannosuke's knee by dropkicking him in the knee. On September 3, Gannosuke appeared under the Hayabusa mask and attire and attacked H and then Gannosuke began competing as Hayabusa. This culminated in the main event of the 10th Anniversary Show, in which H defeated Hayabusa and then the two reconciled.

== Results ==
| No. | Results | Stipulations | Times |
|---|---|---|---|
| 1 | Yoshinori Sasaki defeated Naohiko Yamazaki | Singles match | 8:24 |
| 2 | Jado defeated Flying Kid Ichihara (with Sena Wakana) via submission | Singles match | 10:42 |
| 3 | Emi Motokawa and Kaori Nakayama defeated Tanny Mouse and Yuka Nakamura | Tag team match | 12:23 |
| 4 | Shoichi Arai defeated Ricky Fuji | Singles match with Kodo Fuyuki as the special guest referee | 3:45 |
| 5 | Darkside Hayabusa, Hisakatsu Oya and Tetsuhiro Kuroda defeated Hido, Koji Nakagawa and Yukihiro Kanemura | Six-man tag team match | 19:46 |
| 6 | Masato Tanaka defeated Mr. Gannosuke (c) | Singles match for the FMW Independent Heavyweight Championship with Kodo Fuyuki as the special guest referee | 20:51 |
(c) / – the champion(s) heading into the match
