= FMW Independent Heavyweight Championship =

Details
- Promotion: Frontier Martial-Arts Wrestling
- Date established: May 27, 1996
- Date retired: August 25, 1999

Other name
- FMW Double Championship (1996–1999)
Statistics
- First champion: W*ING Kanemura
- Final champion: Masato Tanaka
- Most reigns: Mr. Gannosuke and Masato Tanaka (2 reigns)
- Longest reign: The Gladiator (291 days)
- Shortest reign: Masato Tanaka (5 days)

The FMW Independent Heavyweight Championship was a professional wrestling world heavyweight championship contested in Frontier Martial-Arts Wrestling (FMW). It was one of the top two titles in the company, along with the FMW Brass Knuckles Heavyweight Championship. The title belt was created for Atsushi Onita to use in his retirement match at 6th Anniversary Show in 1995 but could not be shipped to FMW at that time and the title was finally shipped to FMW in 1996 and FMW used it as the alternative top title to the Brass Knuckles Heavyweight Championship. Both titles were unified later that year and were collectively referred to as "FMW Double Championship". The titles were separated in 1999 and deactivated later that year in favor of the new WEW Single Championship.

== History ==
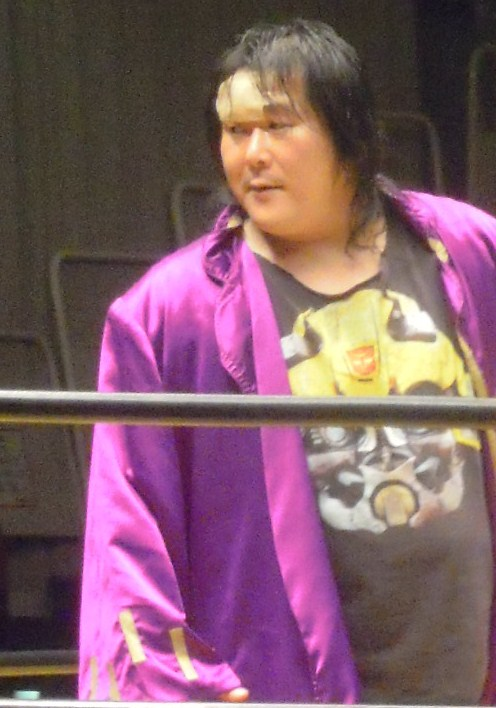
W*ING Kanemura was the inaugural Independent Heavyweight Champion.

FMW requested a new customized FMW Brass Knuckles Heavyweight Championship belt for Atsushi Onita to defend it against Hayabusa in the former's retirement match at 6th Anniversary Show on May 5, 1995, but the title could not be created at that time. The title was shipped a year later to FMW in 1996 when Onita had already retired from in-ring competition and FMW would have two Brass Knuckles Championship belts. FMW used the second title belt as a new alternative world heavyweight championship naming it the "FMW Independent Heavyweight Championship" and an eight-man single-elimination tournament was conducted to determine the inaugural champion and the tournament took place during a period of three months. W*ING Kanemura defeated Masato Tanaka in the finals of the tournament to become the inaugural champion at Summer Spectacular on August 1, 1996. The title would then be unified with the Brass Knuckles Heavyweight Championship after Brass Knuckles Heavyweight Champion The Gladiator defeated the Independent Heavyweight Champion W*ING Kanemura in a title unification match at Year End Spectacular on December 11. Both titles would then be defended collectively as the "Double Titles Championship" or simply the "Double Championship" for the next two and a half years.

On May 18, 1999, the FMW Commissioner Kodo Fuyuki vacated and split the Double Championship and split the Independent Heavyweight Championship from the Brass Knuckles Heavyweight Championship as separate titles, awarding the Independent Heavyweight Championship to Mr. Gannosuke, making him the first two-time champion. During this time, Fuyuki decided to change the promotion's name from FMW to World Entertainment Wrestling (WEW) but FMW President Shoichi Arai rejected the request and allowed him to change the name of the FMW titles to WEW titles instead. On August 25, the Independent Heavyweight Championship and the Brass Knuckles Heavyweight Championship were retired at the Goodbye Hayabusa II: Last Match event, where both titles were defended for the final time. Champion Masato Tanaka defeated Yukihiro Kanemura at the event to retain the title in the final defense of the Independent Heavyweight Championship to become the final Independent Heavyweight Champion. The title belts were auctioned and a new WEW World Heavyweight Championship was created instead as the sole world championship of FMW.

=== Inaugural tournament ===
Quarter finals
May 27
Masato Tanaka	Pin
Mr. Pogo	20:42
June 27
Hisakatsu Oya	Referee stoppage
Horace Boulder	13:21
June 17
Hido	Pin
Super Leather	19:18
June 27
Koji Nakagawa	Pin
W*ING Kanemura	15:51

Semi finals
July 21
Masato Tanaka	Pin
Hisakatsu Oya	20:31
July 21
Super Leather	Pin
W*ING Kanemura	15:59

Final
Summer Spectacular
Masato Tanaka	Pin
W*ING Kanemura	14:51

== Title history ==
=== Names ===
Name	Years
FMW Independent Heavyweight Championship	August 1, 1996–December 12, 1996
FMW Double Championship	December 12, 1996–May 18, 1999
FMW Independent Heavyweight Championship	May 18, 1999–August 25, 1999

=== Reigns ===
No:	Wrestler:	Reigns:	Date:	Days held:	Location:	Event:	Notes:
1	W*ING Kanemura	1	August 1, 1996	132	Tokyo, Japan	Summer Spectacular	Kanemura defeated Masato Tanaka in a tournament final to become the inaugural champion.
2	The Gladiator	1	December 11, 1996	291	Tokyo, Japan	Year End Spectacular	Gladiator defeated Kanemura to unify the Independent Heavyweight Championship with the FMW Brass Knuckles Heavyweight Championship and the title was renamed FMW Double Championship.
3	Masato Tanaka	1	September 28, 1997	100	Kawasaki, Kanagawa	Fall Spectacular	
4	Mr. Gannosuke	1	January 6, 1998	114	Tokyo, Japan	New Year Generation Tour	
5	Hayabusa	1	April 30, 1998	204	Yokohama, Kanagawa	9th Anniversary Show	
6	Kodo Fuyuki	1	November 20, 1998	179	Yokohama, Kanagawa	Scramble Survivor Tour	
7	Mr. Gannosuke	2	May 18, 1999	94	Tokyo, Japan	FMW	Kodo Fuyuki relinquished the title due to injury and awarded it to Gannosuke. The title was separated from the FMW Brass Knuckles Heavyweight Championship and continued to be defended as the FMW Independent Heavyweight Championship.
8	Masato Tanaka	2	August 20, 1999	5	Tokyo, Japan	Goodbye Hayabusa II: Haunted House	
—	Retired	—	August 25, 1999	—	Sapporo, Hokkaido	Goodbye Hayabusa II: Last Match	The title, along with the FMW Brass Knuckles Heavyweight Championship were abandoned and replaced with a new WEW Single Championship.

== Combined reigns ==
Rank	Wrestler	No. of reigns	Combined days
1	The Gladiator	2	291
2	Mr. Gannosuke	2	208
3	Hayabusa	1	204
4	Kodo Fuyuki	1	179
5	Kintaro Kanemura	1	132
6	Masato Tanaka	2	105

== See also ==
- FMW Brass Knuckles Heavyweight Championship
- WEW Heavyweight Championship
