= Grigory Verichev =

Russian judoka (1957–2006)

Personal information
- Born: 4 April 1957 Küñgär, Russia
- Died: 25 May 2006 (aged 49) Chelyabinsk, Russia
- Occupation: Judoka
- Height: 1.88 m (6 ft 2 in)
- Weight: 125 kg (276 lb)
- Professional wrestling career
- Ring name: Grigory Verichev
- Debut: 1990
- Retired: 1993

Sport
- Country: Soviet Union
- Sport: Judo
- Weight class: +95 kg, Open

Achievements and titles
- Olympic Games: (bronze) (1988)
- World Champ.: (1987)
- European Champ.: (gold) (1981, 1985, 1987, 1988)
Medal record
Men's judo
Representing Soviet Union
Olympic Games
Bronze medal – third place	1988 Seoul	+95 kg
World Championships
Gold medal – first place	1987 Essen	+95 kg
Silver medal – second place	1981 Maastricht	+95 kg
Bronze medal – third place	1985 Seoul	+95 kg
Bronze medal – third place	1989 Belgrade	+95 kg
European Championships
Gold medal – first place	1981 Debrecen	+95 kg
Gold medal – first place	1985 Hamar	+95 kg
Gold medal – first place	1987 Paris	Open
Gold medal – first place	1988 Pamplona	+95 kg
Silver medal – second place	1984 Liege	Open
Bronze medal – third place	1982 Rostock	+95 kg
Bronze medal – third place	1983 Paris	Open
Bronze medal – third place	1986 Belgrade	+95 kg
Bronze medal – third place	1986 Belgrade	Open
Bronze medal – third place	1989 Helsinki	+95 kg

Profile at external databases
- IJF: 53797
- JudoInside.com: 5748
- Updated on 18 June 2023

Grigory Vladimirovich Verichev (Russian: Григорий владимирович Веричев; 4 April 1957 – 25 May 2006) was a Russian judoka who competed for the Soviet Union at the 1988 Summer Olympics, where he won a bronze medal in the heavyweight class.

From 1990 to 1993 Verichev competed for Frontier Martial-Arts Wrestling in Japan.

== Championships and accomplishments ==
- Frontier Martial-Arts Wrestling
  - WWA World Martial Arts Heavyweight Championship (1 time)
  - WWA World Martial Arts Tag Team Championship (1 time) - with Tarzan Goto
  - Street Fight Tag Team Tournament (1992) - with Atsushi Onita
