= Despina Montagas =

Greek professional wrestler (born 1961)

Personal information
- Born: June 9, 1961 (age 65) Athens, Greece
- Spouses: Tarzan Goto (until death, 2022)
- Children: 3

Professional wrestling career
- Ring name(s): Despina Montagas; Despina Goto; Batgirl
- Trained by: The Fabulous Moolah
- Debut: 1984
- Retired: 1991

Despina Montagas (born June 9, 1961) is a retired Greek female professional wrestler.

== Professional wrestling career ==
Despina Montagas debuted in 1984 for the American Wrestling Association in Minneapolis. She would also wrestle for various territories including Florida (Championship Wrestling from Florida), Mid-Atlantic (Jim Crockett Promotions), Memphis (Continental Wrestling Association), and New York (World Wrestling Federation). She also went overseas to Japan to wrestle for All Japan Women's Pro Wrestling. In 1986, she had a brief stint in the Gulf Coast for Continental Championship Wrestling. She also had a stint in Mexico for the Universal Wrestling Association.

In 1989, she returned to Japan to wrestle for Frontier Martial-Arts Wrestling. In October 1990, she took part in the country's first mixed tag team match. In March 1991, she left the promotion and retired shortly thereafter.

== Personal life ==
Montagas was married to Tarzan Goto, and the couple have three sons. A year after beginning to wrestle, Montagas quit and sold life insurance, but returned to wrestling shortly afterwards. Goto died on May 29, 2022, from liver cancer.

== Championships and accomplishments ==
- All-Star Wrestling (Florida)
  - Florida Women's Championship (1 time)
