= Tarzan Goto =

Japanese professional wrestler (1963–2022)

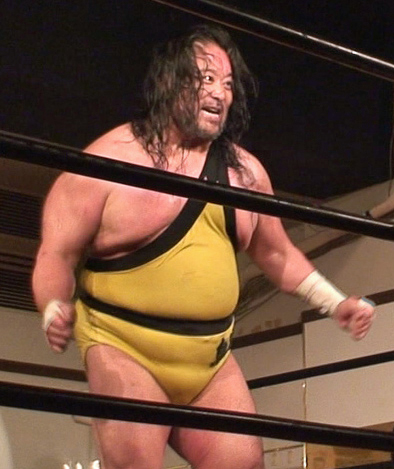
- Goto in 2009

Personal information
- Born: Seiji Goto; August 16, 1963 Shimada, Shizuoka, Japan
- Died: May 29, 2022 (aged 58)
- Spouse: Despina Montagas
- Children: 3

Professional wrestling career
- Ring name(s): Tarzan Goto; Ho Chi Winh; Ghost Face
- Billed height: 1.78 m (5 ft 10 in)
- Billed weight: 150 kg (331 lb)
- Trained by: Jumbo Tsuruta
- Debut: February 19, 1981
- Retired: December 9, 2018

Seiji Goto (後藤政二, Gotō Seiji; August 16, 1963 – May 29, 2022), better known by his ring name Tarzan Goto (ターザン後藤), was a Japanese professional wrestler who wrestled on the independent circuit most of his career. He is best known for his exploding steel cage matches against Atsushi Onita in Frontier Martial-Arts Wrestling (FMW).

== Sumo wrestling career ==
In 1979, Goto joined a sumo stable, Kokonoe, but shortly afterwards he retired from sumo.

=== Career record ===
Goto Seiji
Year	January Hatsu basho, Tokyo	March Haru basho, Osaka	May Natsu basho, Tokyo	July Nagoya basho, Nagoya	September Aki basho, Tokyo	November Kyūshū basho, Fukuoka
1979	x	(Maezumo)	West Jonokuchi #32; 5–2	East Jonidan #95; 2–5	West Jonidan #120; Sat out due to injury 0–0–7	West Jonokuchi #24; Retired; 0–0–7
Record given as wins–losses–absences Top division champion Top division runner-up Retired Lower divisions Non-participation Sanshō key: F=Fighting spirit; O=Outstanding performance; T=Technique Also shown: ★=Kinboshi; P=Playoff(s); Divisions: Makuuchi — Jūryō — Makushita — Sandanme — Jonidan — Jonokuchi Makuuchi ranks: Yokozuna — Ōzeki — Sekiwake — Komusubi — Maegashira

== Professional wrestling career ==
=== All Japan Pro Wrestling (1981–1985) ===
Goto debuted for All Japan Pro Wrestling on February 19, 1981, against Shiro Koshinaka. While in AJPW, he was student of Jumbo Tsuruta. In 1983, he won the Rookie of the Year award at Tokyo Sports' Pro Wrestling Awards.

=== United States (1985–1989) ===
In November 1985, Goto went to the United States to wrestle. His first stop on his excursion was in Kansas City for the NWA Central States Wrestling. He'd also wrestle for Jim Crockett Promotions on shows within the area. In June 1986, Goto moved to Memphis, wrestling for Continental Wrestling Association, where he teamed with Akio Sato and managed by Tojo Yamamoto. While in the United States, he married female wrestler Despina Montagas. In 1988, he wrestled for World Wrestling Council in Puerto Rico. In 1989, he wrestled in Florida for Professional Wrestling Federation.

=== Frontier Martial-Arts Wrestling (1989–1995) ===
In 1989, Goto returned to Japan after being proposed by the founder of the pioneering hardcore wrestling promotion Frontier Martial-Arts Wrestling, Atsushi Onita.

In August 1990, Goto had the first-ever exploding barbed wire match with Onita, which started a revolution between the small "garbage wrestling" organizations of Japan. Two months later, Goto and his wife Despina Montagas teamed up in Japan's first mixed tag team match, defeating Ricky Fuji and Megumi Kudo. He wrestled in many matches for FMW even one that he lost in which he tagged with Onita and lost to Sabu and Horace Boulder.

In 1991, he and tag team partner Atsushi Onita became the first-ever FMW Brass Knuckles Tag Team Champions in the finals of a ten-team tournament defeating Gregory Veritchev and Koba Krutanize. He had several death matches for the FMW Brass Knuckles Heavyweight Championship against his former AJPW comrade, Atsushi Onita. On January 30, 1992, Goto captured the FMW Brass Knuckles Heavyweight Championship after defeating Big Titan. Due to the wind conditions, Goto's and Onita's fire deathmatch versus The Sheik and Sabu was called off. He later became a two-time tag team champion with Gregory Veritchev.

In February 1995, Goto formed Lethal Weapon with Hisakatsu Oya and Ricky Fuji. However, upset about possibly losing to Onita in his retirement match, Goto announced that he was leaving FMW in April 1995, just two days after no-showing an event in Korakuen Hall.

=== Post-FMW career (1995–2018) ===
After leaving FMW, Goto wrestled throughout the Japanese indies. He also contested two matches for Extreme Championship Wrestling in July 1996 at the Heat Wave event, defeating Axl Rotten both nights. Goto also worked for International Wrestling Association of Japan from 1995 to 1999. Goto returned to one-night returns to AJPW in 2001 and 2002. In 1995, he formed Super FMW, which lasted from 1995 to 1998 in its first run and from 2009 to 2018 in its second run. His last match to date was on December 9, 2018, teaming with Reina Ayukawa defeating Taro Ramen and Sase in a Caribbean Barbed wire Thumbtacks Death Match. It would also end up being the very last show for Super FMW, although another show was originally scheduled for November 10, 2019, but due to poor ticket sales, it was rescheduled to March 29, 2020. Unfortunately, the show would be canceled due to COVID-19 and Super FMW quietly folded.

== Personal life and death ==
Goto was married to Despina Montagas, and they have three sons. He had since remarried in December 2016.

On May 29, 2022, Goto died from liver cancer at the age of 58.

== Championships and accomplishments ==
- Continental Wrestling Association
  - CWA/AWA International Tag Team Championship (5 times) - with Akio Sato
- Dynamite Vamp
  - Gotta Ippa & Dynamite Vamp Mixed Tag Tournament - with Mikan
- Frontier Martial-Arts Wrestling
  - FMW WWA Martial Arts Heavyweight Championship (1 time)
  - FMW WWA Martial Arts Tag Team Championship (2 times) - with Atsushi Onita (1 time) and Grigory Verichev (1 time)
  - World's Strongest Tag Team Tournament (1992) - with Atsushi Onita
  - Six Man Tag Team Tournament (1994) - with Atsushi Onita and Sambo Asako
- International Wrestling Association of Japan
  - IWA World Heavyweight Championship (2 times)
  - IWA World Tag Team Championship (1 time) - with Mr. Gannosuke
- National Wrestling Alliance
  - NWA World Tag Team Championship (1 time) - with Mr. Gannosuke
- Tokyo Sports
  - Match of the Year (1990) vs. Atsushi Onita on August 4
  - Match of the Year (1994) with Atsushi Onita vs. Ashura Hara and Genichiro Tenryu on March 2
  - Newcomer of the Year (1983)
