= Horace Hogan =

American professional wrestler (born 1965)

Personal information
- Born: Michael Allan Bollea; October 21, 1965 (age 61) Tampa, Florida, U.S.
- Children: 2
- Family: Hulk Hogan (uncle); Nick Hogan (cousin); Brooke Hogan (cousin); Mike Awesome (cousin)

Professional wrestling career
- Ring name(s): Axe Boulder; Horace; Horace Boulder; Horace Hogan; The Predator; Prey of the Dead
- Billed height: 6 ft 6 in (198 cm)
- Billed weight: 240 lb (110 kg)
- Billed from: Tampa, Florida
- Trained by: Boris Malenko; WCW Power Plant
- Debut: January 1990
- Retired: September 2002

Michael Allan Bollea (born October 21, 1965) is an American retired professional wrestler. The nephew of fellow wrestler Hulk Hogan, he is best known for his appearances with World Championship Wrestling in the late 1990s under the ring name Horace Hogan.

== Professional wrestling career ==
=== Early career (1990–1991) ===
Bollea was trained by Boris Malenko, debuting on the Floridian independent circuit in January 1990 under the ring name "Horace Boulder". Bollea competed for promotions such as the International Championship Wrestling Alliance.

=== Frontier Martial-Arts Wrestling (1991–1992) ===
In May 1991, Bollea joined the Japanese promotion Frontier Martial-Arts Wrestling. In mid-1991, Bollea formed a dominant tag team with a fellow gaijin wrestler, The Gladiator (his cousin). The duo engaged in a long-running feud with Atsushi Onita and Sambo Asako.

In April 1992, Bollea began tagging with Sabu. On May 7, 1992, in Tokyo, Bollea and Sabu defeated Onita and Tarzan Goto for the WWA World Martial Arts Tag Team Championship. They held the championship until May 24, 1992, when they were defeated by Goto and Gregory Veritchev in Tokyo. Bollea continued to compete with FMW until December 1992.

=== World Wrestling Federation (1993) ===
In January 1993, Bollea joined the World Wrestling Federation as "The Predator". Sometimes he wore a mask. He made his televised debut on the January 30, 1993, episode of WWF Wrestling Challenge losing to El Matador. This was his sole televised match in the WWF, as he competed exclusively at house shows for the remainder of his tenure. He was used primarily as a jobber, losing to wrestlers such as Jim Brunzell, Jim Powers, and Marty Jannetty. His only victory was against Louie Spicolli. Bollea made his final appearance with the WWF in August 1993.

=== New Japan Pro-Wrestling (1993) ===
In April 1993, Bollea toured Japan with New Japan Pro-Wrestling, wrestling as "Axe Boulder".

=== Extreme Championship Wrestling (1995) ===
In early 1995, Bollea briefly performed with Extreme Championship Wrestling under the ring name "Prey of the Dead".

=== Frontier Martial-Arts Wrestling (1995–1996, 1998) ===
In mid-1995, Bollea returned to FMW. He joined the stable "Lethal Weapon" with Hisakatsu Oya, The Gladiator, Mr. Pogo, and Ricky Fuji. He and Oya began teaming together and won the FMW Brass Knuckles Tag Team Championship from Daisuke Ikeda and Yoshiaki Fujiwara on December 21, 1995, in Yokohama. Their reign lasted until January 5, 1996, when Jason the Terrible and Super Leather defeated them in Tokyo.

He would return in March 1998 with the stable "Team No Respect" with Mr. Gannosuke, Hido, Kodo Fuyuki and Super Leather before getting a contract with WCW.

=== World Championship Wrestling (1996–2000) ===
Returning to America, Bollea debuted in World Championship Wrestling. On the February 23, 1997 episode of WCW Worldwide (taped November 10, 1996), Bollea, as Horace Boulder, defeated J.L. (Jerry Lynn). On April 19, 1998, at Spring Stampede, Boulder officially debuted helping Raven defeat Diamond Dallas Page for the WCW United States Heavyweight Championship and joining Raven's Flock in the process, under the name "Horace Boulder". He remained in the Flock until the stable disbanded on September 13, 1998.

The fall of 1998 held one of the most crucial moments in Horace's wrestling career. Hollywood Hogan, backed by fellow New World Order (nWo) Hollywood members, revealed on the October 19 episode of WCW Monday Nitro that Horace was the son of his dead brother. Showing a sincerity not seen in previous years, he continued by proclaiming his love to his family and offering Horace a membership in the nWo. The mood took a turn when Hogan bashed his nephew with a steel chair, causing a wound that required several stitches. He continued by throwing his nephew off a stretcher and mercilessly beating him. During this time, Hogan was involved in a heated rivalry with The Ultimate Warrior, and this scene worked as a testament to Hulk's fragile state of mind. With fellow nWo members standing in bewilderment, Hogan took the mic and said "If I could do this to someone I love, imagine what I'm gonna do to you, Warrior!"

Despite their unsettling confrontation, on October 25 at Halloween Havoc, Horace joined nWo Hollywood by interfering on his uncle's behalf during the final match between Hollywood Hogan and The Warrior. Thereafter, he began using the ring name "Horace Hogan" to signify his blood ties with Hulk Hogan. He wrestled for the nWo in singles matches and teamed with Scott Norton, Stevie Ray, Vincent; in early 1999, he and Brian Adams challenged for the WCW World Tag Team Championship while feuding with The Four Horsemen. Hogan also participated in a WCW Thunder battle royal for leadership of the nWo Hollywood faction. When the nWo Elite and B-Team began to dissolve in 1999, Horace began competing for the WCW Hardcore Championship.

Horace and his uncle began feuding with Billy Kidman and the New Blood in April 2000, with Horace helping Hogan defeat Kidman at Slamboree on May 7, 2000. He defected to the New Blood after its leader, Eric Bischoff, offered him Kidman's girlfriend Torrie Wilson in exchange for his assistance. Horace feuded with his uncle until The Great American Bash on June 11, when he refereed a rematch between Kidman and his uncle fairly, allowing his uncle to defeat Kidman after interference from Torrie who gave Hulk some brass knuckles, which he used to get the win. After Hulk Hogan left WCW in July 2000 due to a legitimate incident with Vince Russo that happened at that year's Bash at the Beach pay-per-view, Horace left the promotion.

=== Worldwide appearances (2000–2002) ===
After leaving WCW, Bollea began wrestling around the world, appearing with promotions including the X Wrestling Federation, the World Wrestling Council in Puerto Rico and Frontier Martial-Arts Wrestling.

=== World Wrestling Entertainment (2002) ===
In 2002, Bollea was signed to a developmental contract by World Wrestling Entertainment. He was assigned to the Ohio-based Heartland Wrestling Association development territory. In September, Bollea was recalled to the main roster, wrestling dark matches for the SmackDown brand. He remained with WWE until being released later that month. Following his release, Bollea wrestled briefly on the independent circuit before retiring from professional wrestling to work in the construction industry.

== Personal life ==
Bollea is the son of Martha Alfonso (1944–1978) and Allan Bollea (1947–1986), brother of professional wrestler Terry Bollea better known as Hulk Hogan, making him Hogan's nephew. Bollea's parents separated when he was a child. In 1978, his mother, Martha Alfonso, was murdered by her boyfriend, and his father died of a drug overdose in 1986. Bollea has two sisters.

Professional wrestler Mike Awesome was Bollea's cousin. The two were close as children, with Bollea encouraging Awesome to wrestle, and later helping him secure a job with World Championship Wrestling in the late 1990s.

Bollea has two daughters.

== Championships and accomplishments ==
- Frontier Martial Arts Wrestling
  - FMW Brass Knuckles Tag Team Championship (1 time) – with Hisakatsu Oya
  - WWA Martial Arts Tag Team Championship (1 time) – with Sabu
- Pro Wrestling Illustrated
  - PWI ranked him No. 257 of the top 500 singles wrestlers in the PWI 500 in 1992
  - PWI ranked him No. 497 of the 500 best wrestlers of the PWI Years in 2003
- Other titles
  - PCW Heavyweight Championship (1 time)
  - SPW Heavyweight Championship (1 time)
