= Kaori Nakayama =

Japanese wrestler

Personal information
- Born: March 14, 1978 (age 48) Hobikino, Osaka, Japan

Professional wrestling career
- Ring name: Kaori Nakayama
- Billed height: 1.50 m (4 ft 11 in)
- Billed weight: 53 kg (117 lb)
- Trained by: Megumi Kudo
- Debut: July 19, 1994
- Retired: October 23, 2002

Kaori Nakayama (中山香里) is a retired Japanese professional wrestler who spent much of her career with Frontier Martial-Arts Wrestling.

== Professional wrestling career ==
The daughter of former All Japan Women's Pro Wrestling star Miyoko Hoshino, Kaori Nakayama followed in her mother's footsteps by training at the Frontier Martial-Arts Wrestling Dojo, where she was trained by another former AJW star, Megumi Kudo. Nakayama made her debut on July 19, 1994, against Mayumi Shimizu. After two years of paying her dues, she gradually ascended the ranks. Nakayama was widely expected to become the next prominent female babyface following Megumi Kudo's retirement. However, FMW and the media abandoned their women's division, discontinued the championships, and by the summer of 1998, all the female wrestlers had left the promotion. However, Nakayama stayed loyal and remained with the promotion.

With no other females to wrestle, Nakayama was put in several intergender matches for over a year, before FMW signed Emi Motokawa in August 1999. Nakayama and Motokawa would alternate as partners and opponents. In 2000, Nakayama joined Masato Tanaka and Gedo and Jado in a stable called The Complete Players. In September 2000, Nakayama won her only championship, the WEW Six-Man Tag Team Championship, with Gedo and Jado, defeating Kodo Fuyuki, Mr. Gannosuke, and Shinjuku Shark. They would hold onto the titles, until January 2001, when they vacated the titles. A month later, Nakayama, Jado, Gedo, Tanaka, and Hideki Hosaka announced that they would be leaving FMW, citing problems with Shoichi Arai.

After leaving FMW, Nakayama became a freelancer, wrestling for various promotions, including BattlARTS, GAEA Japan, JWP Joshi Puroresu, Ladies Legend Pro-Wrestling, NEO Ladies, OZ Academy, Onita Pro, World W*ING Spirit, World Entertainment Wrestling, and Wrestling Marvelous Future. On October 23, 2002, she wrestled her retirement match, losing to Shark Tsuchiya.

== Mixed martial arts career ==
In May 2001, Nakayama made her mixed martial arts debut at JEWELS' ReMix Golden Gate 2001 event, losing to Yeon Hwa Lee by judges' decision. In August 2002, she fought her second and final fight at Smackgirl's Summer Gate 2002 event, losing to Lay Ho by judges' decision.

== Championships and accomplishments ==
- Frontier Martial Arts Wrestling
  - WEW 6-Man Tag Team Championship (1 time) - with Gedo and Jado

== Mixed martial arts record ==
Professional record breakdown
2 matches	0 wins	2 losses
By knockout	0	0
By submission	0	0
By decision	0	2
Draws	0	

Res.	Record	Opponent	Method	Event	Date	Round	Time	Location	Notes
Loss	0–2	Lay Ho	Judges' unanimous decision	Smackgirl Summer Gate 2002	August 4, 2002	3	5:00	Tokyo, Japan	
Loss	0–1	Yeon Hwa Lee	Judges' decision	Remix Golden Gate 2001	May 3, 2001	3	5:00	Tokyo, Japan	
