= Nakajima Sports Center =

Event facility in Sapporo, Hokkaido, Japan

The Nakajima Sports Center (中島スポーツセンター, Nakajima Supōtsu Sentā) is a multi-purpose event facility located in Nakajima Park in Chūō-ku, Sapporo, Hokkaido, Japan. It was built in 1954 for the National Sports Festival of Japan. A concert by the rock band Rainbow in January 1978 resulted in one death when 2,000 fans rushed the stage. By the end of the 1990s, the facility had lost its viability and was eventually converted to its current state.

Boats are available for rental at the Shobu Pond near the sports center entrance from spring to autumn. This pond was built in 1871 as a lumber yard to store timber felled from the upper reaches of the Ishikari River.
