= FMW Brass Knuckles Heavyweight Championship =

Wrestling championship

Details
- Promotion: Frontier Martial-Arts Wrestling
- Date established: January 7, 1990
- Date retired: August 25, 1999

Other names
- WWA Brass Knuckles Heavyweight Championship; WWA World Martial Arts Heavyweight Championship
Statistics
- First champion: Beast the Barbarian
- Final champion: Hayabusa
- Most reigns: Atsushi Onita (7 reigns)
- Longest reign: The Gladiator (490 days)
- Shortest reign: Hayabusa (<1 days)

The FMW Brass Knuckles Heavyweight Championship was the world heavyweight championship for the wrestling promotion Frontier Martial-Arts Wrestling (FMW). It was one of the two premier championships in FMW, alongside the FMW Independent Heavyweight Championship.

== Title history ==
=== Names ===
Name	Years
WWA Brass Knuckles Heavyweight Championship	January 7, 1990–February 27, 1991
WWA World Martial Arts Heavyweight Championship	February 27, 1991–August 28, 1993
FMW Brass Knuckles Heavyweight Championship	August 28, 1993–December 12, 1996
FMW Double Championship	December 12, 1996–May 18, 1999
FMW Brass Knuckles Heavyweight Championship	May 18, 1999–August 25, 1999

=== Reigns ===
Key
No.	Overall reign number
Reign	Reign number for the specific champion
Days	Number of days held

No.	Champion	Championship change			Reign statistics		Notes	Ref.
No.	Champion	Date	Event	Location	Reign	Days	Notes	Ref.
1	Beast the Barbarian	January 7, 1990	Battle Resistance - 1st Open Tournament	Tokyo	1	10	Recognized as first champion.	
2	Atsushi Onita	January 17, 1990	House show	Tokyo	1	406	The title was renamed WWA World Martial Arts Heavyweight Championship on February 27, 1991.	
3	Grigory Verichev	February 27, 1991	House show	Tokyo	1	91		
4	Atsushi Onita	May 29, 1991	House show	Tokyo	2	231		
5	Big Titan	January 15, 1992	House show	Kobe, Hyogo	1	15		
6	Tarzan Goto	January 30, 1992	House show	Tokyo	1	55		
7	Leon Spinks	March 25, 1992	House show	Tokyo	1	60		
8	Atsushi Onita	May 24, 1992	House show	Tokyo	3	32		
9	The Sheik	June 25, 1992	House show	Sapporo, Hokkaido	1	(Note: The exact date when The Sheik rewarded the title to Tiger Jeet Singh is uncertain, which means that the championship reign lasted between 37 and 67 days.)		
10	Tiger Jeet Singh	August 1992	House show	Sapporo, Hokkaido	1	(Note: The exact date when The Sheik rewarded the title to Tiger Jeet Singh is uncertain, which means that Singh's championship reign lasted between 19 and 49 days.)	The Sheik rewarded the title to Tiger Jeet Singh for helping him in beating Atsushi Onita for the title.	
11	Atsushi Onita	September 19, 1992	3rd Anniversary Show	Yokohama, Kanagawa	4	337	Title replaced by the FMW World Brass Knuckles Heavyweight Championship.	
12	Atsushi Onita	August 22, 1993	Summer Spectacular	Osaka	5	137	Onita defeated Mr. Pogo to become the first FMW World Brass Knuckles Heavyweight Champion.	
13	Mr. Pogo	January 6, 1994	House show	Tokyo	1	244		
14	Atsushi Onita	September 7, 1994	House show	Sapporo, Hokkaido	6	136		
15	Mr. Pogo	January 21, 1995	House show	Sendai, Miyagi	2	103		
16	Atsushi Onita	May 4, 1995	House show	Sendai, Miyagi	7	1		
—	Vacated	May 5, 1995	6th Anniversary Show	Kawasaki, Kanagawa	—	—	Atsushi Onita vacated the title due to his retirement.	
17	Hayabusa	June 27, 1995	House show	Tokyo	1	<1	Hayabusa defeated Hisakatsu Oya for the vacant title.	
—	Vacated	June 27, 1995	House show	Tokyo	—	—	Hayabusa vacated the title due to injury.	
18	The Gladiator	September 26, 1995	Grand Slam tour	Tokyo	1	101	Gladiator defeated Hayabusa in the finals of a Grand Slam Tournament.	
—	Vacated	January 5, 1996	House show	Tokyo	—	—	The Gladiator vacated the title due to injury.	
19	Super Leather	February 23, 1996	House show	Tokyo	1	94	Leather defeated Hisakatsu Oya for the vacant title.	
20	The Gladiator	May 27, 1996	House show	Fukuoka, Fukuoka	2	489	Gladiator unified the title with the FMW Independent Heavyweight Championship by defeating W*ING Kanemura on December 11, 1996 and the title was renamed to Double Championship. This was the longest reign of the Brass Knuckles Heavyweight Championship.	
21	Masato Tanaka	September 28, 1997	Fall Spectacular	Kawasaki, Kanagawa	1	100		
22	Mr. Gannosuke	January 6, 1998	New Year Generation tour	Tokyo	1	114		
23	Hayabusa	April 30, 1998	9th Anniversary Show	Yokohama, Kanagawa	2	204		
24	Kodo Fuyuki	November 20, 1998	Scramble Survivor tour	Yokohama, Kanagawa	1	179		
25	Yukihiro Kanemura	May 18, 1999	House show	Tokyo	1	97	Kodo Fuyuki relinquished the title due to injury and awarded it to Kanemura. As a result, the title was split from the Independent Heavyweight Championship, reverted to being Brass Knuckles Heavyweight Championship.	
26	Hayabusa	August 23, 1999	Goodbye Hayabusa II: Hayabusa Graduation Ceremony	Tokyo	3	2		
—	Deactivated	August 25, 1999	Goodbye Hayabusa II: Last Match	Sapporo, Hokkaido	—	—	The title was retired and replaced with WEW Heavyweight Championship.	

== Combined reigns ==
Rank	Wrestler	No. of reigns	Combined days
1	Atsushi Onita	7	1,280
2	The Gladiator	2	590
3	Mr. Pogo	2	347
4	Hayabusa	3	206
5	Kodo Fuyuki	1	179
6	Mr. Gannosuke	1	114
7	Masato Tanaka	1	100
8	Yukihiro Kanemura	1	97
9	Super Leather	1	94
10	Grigory Verichev	1	90
11	Leon Spinks	1	60
12	Tarzan Goto	1	55
13	Tiger Jeet Singh	1	49
14	The Sheik	1	37
15	Big Titan	1	15
16	Beast the Barbarian	1	10
