= WEW 6-Man Tag Team Championship =

Professional wrestling trios tag team championship

Details
- Promotion: Frontier Martial-Arts Wrestling (1999-2002); World Entertainment Wrestling (2002-2004)
- Date established: July 30, 1999
- Date retired: May 5, 2004
Statistics
- First champion(s): Kodo Fuyuki, Koji Nakagawa and Gedo
- Most reigns: Gedo and Kodo Fuyuki (5 reigns)
- Longest reign: Gosaku Goshogawara, TAKA Michinoku and Tetsuhiro Kuroda (344 days)
- Shortest reign: Kodo Fuyuki, Mr. Gannosuke and Shinjuku Shark (2 days)

The WEW 6-Man Tag Team Championship was a championship in Frontier Martial-Arts Wrestling and later in World Entertainment Wrestling. It was active from July 1999 until February 2002 as a substitute for the FMW World Street Fight 6-Man Tag Team Championship. The final champions were Hayabusa, Tetsuhiro Kuroda and GOEMON. They were stripped of the belts on November 5, 2001 when Hayabusa sustained an injury that left him unable to defend the title. The promotion closed in February 2002. The title was later revived in Kodo Fuyuki's World Entertainment Wrestling promotion in 2002 and was used there until the promotion closed on May 5, 2004.

== Title history ==
No:	Wrestler:	Reigns:	Date:	Days held:	Location:	Event:	Notes:
Frontier Martial-Arts Wrestling
1	Team No Respect (Kodo Fuyuki, Koji Nakagawa and Gedo)	1	July 31, 1999	54	Tokyo, Japan	Goodbye Hayabusa tour	Defeated Hayabusa, Masato Tanaka and Tetsuhiro Kuroda in the finals of the WEW 6 Man Tag Team Championship tournament to become the inaugural champions.
2	Masato Tanaka, Tetsuhiro Kuroda and Hisakatsu Oya	1	September 23, 1999	(Note: The exact date when Hisakatsu Oya, Masato Tanaka and Tetsuhiro Kuroda vacated the titles is unknown, which means that their title reign lasted between 8 days and 38 days.)	Kanazawa, Japan	Making of a New Legend III tour	
—	Vacated	—	October 1999	—	—	—	Hisakatsu Oya, Masato Tanaka and Tetsuhiro Kuroda vacated the titles due to splitting up.
3	Ricky Fuji, Flying Kid Ichihara and Chocoball Mukai	1	November 23, 1999	18	Yokohama, Japan	10th Anniversary Show	Defeated Koji Nakagawa, Jado and Gedo in a Ladder match for the vacated title
4	Team No Respect (Koji Nakagawa (2), Jado and Gedo (2))	1	December 11, 1999	136	Tokyo, Japan	Making of a New Legend VI tour	
5	Kodo Fuyuki (2), Kyoko Inoue and Chocoball Mukai (2)	1	April 25, 2000	8	Tokyo, Japan	Night in Shibuya Backdraft Eve	
6	Team No Respect (Koji Nakagawa (3), Jado (2) and Gedo (3))	2	May 3, 2000	25	Fukuoka, Japan	Golden Series tour	
7	Shin Fuyuki-Gun (Kodo Fuyuki (3), Kyoko Inoue (2) and Chocoball Mukai (3))	2	May 28, 2000	29	Tokyo, Japan	Neo FMW tour	
8	Hayabusa, Tetsuhiro Kuroda (2) and Hisakatsu Oya (2)	1	June 26, 2000	81	Gunma, Japan	King of Fight tour	
9	Shin Fuyuki-Gun; Kodo Fuyuki (4), Mr. Gannosuke and Shinjuku Shark	1	September 15, 2000	2	Kumagaya, Japan	Flashover tour	
10	Jado (3), Gedo (4) and Kaori Nakayama	1	September 17, 2000	132	Tokyo, Japan	Flashover tour	
—	Vacated	—	January 27, 2001	—	—	—	Nakayama vacated the title
11	Complete Players (Masato Tanaka, Jado (4) and Gedo (5))	1	February 11, 2001	10	Fukuoka, Japan	Cluster Battle tour	Defeated Kodo Fuyuki, GOEMON, and Onryo for the vacant title
—	Vacated	—	February 21, 2001	—	—	—	Title vacated when all three champions left FMW.
12	Hisakatsu Oya (3), Ricky Fuji (2) and Flying Kid Ichihara (2)	1	May 22, 2001	69	Sapporo, Japan	Neo FMW tour	Defeated Azusa Kudo, Shinjuku Shark and Naohiko Yamazaki for the vacant title
13	Kodo Fuyuki (5), Mr. Gannosuke (2) and Kintaro Kanemura	1	July 30, 2001	41	Fukuoka, Japan	FMW	
14	Hayabusa (2), Tetsuhiro Kuroda (3) and GOEMON (4)	1	September 9, 2001	57	Tokyo, Japan	Super Dynamism tour	Hayabusa formerly held the title as H and GOEMON formerly held the title as Koji Nakagawa.
—	Vacated	—	November 5, 2001	—	Tokyo, Japan	Scramble Survivor tour	Vacated after Hayabusa suffered an injury in a match against Mammoth Sasaki on October 22, 2001. The title was deactivated after FMW closed on February 15, 2002.
World Entertainment Wrestling
15	Gosaku Goshogawara, TAKA Michinoku and Tetsuhiro Kuroda (4)	1	October 23, 2002	344	Tokyo, Japan	WEW	Defeated Kuroge Wagyuta, Masato Tanaka and Shinjiro Otani to revive the title.
16	2 Tuff Tony, Kintaro Kanemura (2) and Mad Man Pondo	1	October 2, 2003	216	Takaoka, Japan	Fuyuki Army	
—	Retired	—	May 5, 2004	—	—	—	The title was retired on May 5, 2004.
