= Corporal Kirchner =

American professional wrestler (1957–2021)

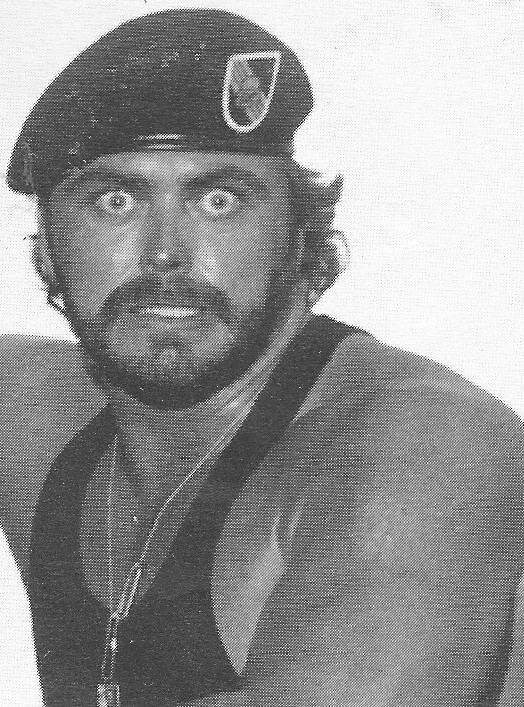
- Kirchner, circa 1988

Personal information
- Born: Michael James Penzel; September 7, 1957 Chicago, Illinois, U.S.
- Died: December 22, 2021 (aged 64) Siler City, North Carolina, U.S.
- Spouse: Tina Duke
- Children: 4

Professional wrestling career
- Ring name(s): Axe; Colonel Kirchner; Corporal Kirchner; Freddie Krueger; Leatherface; RT Reynolds; Super Leather; Super Leather Face
- Billed height: 6 ft 2 in (188 cm)
- Billed weight: 263 lb (119 kg)
- Billed from: Fort Bragg, North Carolina (as Corporal Kirchner); Texas (as Leatherface / Super Leather)
- Trained by: Verne Gagne
- Debut: 1980
- Retired: January 26, 2010
- Military service
- Allegiance: United States
- Branch: United States Army
- Unit: 82nd Airborne Division

Michael James Penzel (September 7, 1957 – December 22, 2021) was an American professional wrestler and United States Army paratrooper. He was best known for his appearances with the World Wrestling Federation under the ring name Corporal Kirchner in the mid-1980s, as well as his appearances in Japan for New Japan Pro-Wrestling, W*ING, International Wrestling Association Japan, and Frontier Martial-Arts Wrestling under the ring name Leatherface.

== Early life ==
Penzel was born in Chicago, Illinois, on September 7, 1957. He enlisted in the United States Army as a teenager, becoming a paratrooper in the 82nd Airborne Division. He left the Army in his early twenties.

== Professional wrestling career ==
=== Early career (1980–1984) ===
While working as a mechanic and bouncer in Minnesota, Penzel met professional wrestler Hulk Hogan in a gym. Hogan introduced him to American Wrestling Association promoter Verne Gagne, who sent him to his professional wrestling school.

=== World Wrestling Federation (1984–1987) ===
After working as a preliminary wrestler for the World Wrestling Federation under the name "RT Reynolds", Penzel was eventually given the character of a military hero after WWF owner/promoter Vince McMahon discovered that he had been in the 82nd Airborne. Penzel then adopted the ring name "Corporal Kirchner" and used a militaristic character with several vignettes airing showing him in typical army survival training exercises to help build his character as a patriotic American. He is known for his feud with Nikolai Volkoff in the World Wrestling Federation in 1986 and into 1987 which included a victory over Volkoff at WrestleMania 2 in a Flag Match; they would trade victories, with Kirchner winning many of the early matches, but Volkoff coming up victorious in most of the matches near the end of the feud. During a pre-Wrestlemania 2 interview with Jesse "The Body" Ventura in Ventura's "Body Shop" segment, he talked about his time in the U.S. Army, and even made a reference to Ventura's time as a Navy SEAL, causing Ventura to momentarily break character and agree with him.

He was a member of the WWF's Australian tour in mid-1986 (the WWF's first tour to Australia under Vince McMahon's ownership), wrestling in Adelaide, Brisbane, Melbourne, Perth and Sydney, and was considered one of the toughest men in the WWF at the time. He was also considered one of the stiffest wrestlers in the WWF and his career suffered because many wrestlers were reluctant to work with him, and he was subsequently used as enhancement talent. He was suspended by the WWF for testing positive for drug use in July 1987 and when his suspension ended, he declined to return and left the company.

In 2001, Kirchner was announced as a participant in the Gimmick Battle Royal at WrestleMania X-Seven. The WWF went as far as to picture him in a graphic on WWF.com promoting the match, though he was removed weeks before the event.

=== Stampede Wrestling (1987) ===
After leaving the World Wrestling Federation, Penzel joined the Calgary, Alberta, Canada-based Stampede Wrestling promotion, debuting in September 1987 under the ring name "Colonel Kirchner". While in Stampede Wrestling, his regular opponents included Jason the Terrible, Makhan Singh, and Zodiac. Penzel left Stampede Wrestling in December 1987.

=== New Japan Pro-Wrestling (1989–1990) ===
Penzel had some short stints with New Japan Pro-Wrestling in June 1989 and March 1990. Then he started what would be a successful wrestling career for himself in Japan as he created the ring name and gimmick of "Leatherface" and tied it in with the villain of the same name from the movie The Texas Chainsaw Massacre.

=== Universal Wrestling Federation (1991) ===
In 1991, Penzel appeared with the Universal Wrestling Federation as "Corporal Kirchner".

=== W*ING (1992–1994) ===
In 1992, Penzel joined Víctor Quiñones' W*ING promotion and was considered by many to be the toughest hardcore wrestler in W*ING. While in Japan, he had a fight with American Wrestling Association wrestler, Jonnie Stewart, breaking Stewart's jaw and causing Stewart to leave the tour prematurely. Penzel was later arrested and jailed for six months following an attempted assault by a fan, which left the fan with severe facial injuries. During his brief time in jail, the Leatherface character that Penzel created was given to another wrestler, Rick Patterson, who eventually left W*ING and went to International Wrestling Association of Japan.

=== International Wrestling Association Japan (1994) ===
During a subsequent match in the IWA that the new Leatherface competed in, the original Leatherface (Penzel) appeared in the crowd. This set up the team of the Leatherfaces, which lasted for only one match and was intended as a transition of the character away from Patterson. On December 13, 1994, the Leatherfaces faced two popular wrestlers, Shoji Nakamaki and Hiroshi Ono, in a nail hell deathmatch. In a match that would become a classic within hardcore wrestling, Penzel broke kayfabe after the match and ripped off a piece of the bed of nails, placed it on Ono's throat and then executed a leg drop onto the patch of nails. He then powerbombed Ono onto the bed of nails. Penzel afterward left the IWA, with the promotion claiming that he was fired in an attempt to salvage Ono's destroyed reputation.

=== Frontier Martial-Arts Wrestling (1995–2002) ===
Penzel then left for Frontier Martial-Arts Wrestling. Using a modified version of his Leatherface gimmick, he debuted for the promotion under the name "Super Leather" and later formed a tag team with Chris Romero. The team proved to be successful, as they managed to score wins over popular and well-known tag teams including Jado and Gedo, and Masato Tanaka and Iko Kuroda. Penzel remained with FMW until its closure in 2002.

=== Late career (2002–2010) ===
Following the closure of FMW, Penzel made some further appearances for International Wrestling Association Japan. He retired from wrestling full-time in 2004. In 2007, he revived his Leatherface character for his first match since 2004. In his return match, he teamed with Jayson Voorhees as The Serial Killers in a losing effort to Mad Man Pondo and Necro Butcher on February 25, 2007, during the Insane Clown Posse's Tempest Release Party. On March 2, the Serial Killers defeated KJ Hellfire and Ricky during the Tempest Release Party. He wrestled his final match in Tokyo, Japan on January 26, 2010, teaming with Mr. Pogo and The W*inger in a loss to Hisakatsu Oya, Ricky Fuji, and Tarzan Goto.

== Personal life ==
Penzel was reportedly announced dead on October 15, 2006, by former employer World Wrestling Entertainment (formerly known as the World Wrestling Federation). On October 21, it was announced that he was still alive. This came as a result of confusion over Penzel's actual name, which was believed to be Thomas Spear at the time. There, in fact, was a Thomas Spear who died in White Marsh, Maryland, but he is completely unconnected to Penzel. Penzel's mother heard about the WWE's announcement of her son's death and immediately called her son to inform him. Penzel and his mom then contacted the WWE to tell that Penzel was still alive and in good health, leading to the WWE's announcement on October 21. Penzel, who was working as a truck driver at the time, later remarked that he was honored and surprised that people still remembered him 20 years after his brief rise to fame in WWF/E.

He died from a heart attack in Siler City, North Carolina, on December 22, 2021, at the age of 64.

== Championships and accomplishments ==
- Frontier Martial-Arts Wrestling
  - FMW Brass Knuckles Heavyweight Championship (1 time)
  - FMW Brass Knuckles Tag Team Championship (1 time) – with Jason the Terrible
  - FMW World Street Fight 6-Man Tag Team Championship (1 time) – with The Headhunters
- W*ING
  - W*ING World Tag Team Championship (1 time) – with Freddy Krueger
- Pro Wrestling Illustrated
  - PWI ranked him #287 of the top 500 singles wrestlers in the PWI 500 in 1991
