= Shoichi Arai =

Japanese professional wrestler (1965 – 2002)

Personal information
- Born: December 19, 1965 Matsudo, Chiba, Japan
- Died: May 16, 2002 (aged 36) Tokyo, Kantō, Japan

Professional wrestling career
- Ring name: Shoichi Arai
- Debut: 1989

Shoichi Arai (荒井 昌一 Arai Shōichi) (December 19, 1965 – May 16, 2002) was a Japanese professional wrestling promoter. Arai ran Frontier Martial-Arts Wrestling from 1995 until its closure in 2002.

== Career ==
Arai started with FMW as a backstage assistant. Arai became FMW's ring announcer, and was well known for his high-pitched voice during countdowns of various death-matches. Arai became Chief Executive Officer of FMW, after Atsushi Onita retired in April 1995. As CEO, Arai toned down the number of death matches, and promoted Hayabusa as the main star of the promotion. Onita returned to FMW in 1996, and insisted on becoming the main focus of the promotion. Arai and the FMW wrestlers eventually met with Onita, and declared that Onita needed to leave FMW, due to Onita's ego and attitude towards the younger stars. FMW shifted its focus towards an entertainment-based style, similar to WWE. The shift occurred after FMW secured a television and pay-per-view deal with DirecTV, who wanted a role in shaping the product. In addition, Kodo Fuyuki was named head booker. Eventually, attendance dwindled, and the promotion dealt with several financial issues. In early-2000, Arai publicly fired Fuyuki who threatened to start a rival promotion as a result.

In October 2001, Hayabusa suffered a career-ending injury against Mammoth Sasaki. While attempting an Asai Moonsault, Hayabusa slipped off the rope and landed on his head, resulting in immediate paralysis. Arai left the commentary booth, and immediately rushed to the ring. Attendance and revenue continued to dwindle, as FMW finally declared bankruptcy on February 15, 2002.

FMW was three million dollars in debt, and Arai also owed the yakuza another million dollars. Arai went into hiding from the yakuza, and planned to write a book about his experience of running FMW. Arai released a statement, where he criticized Atsushi Onita for his ego and excessive womanizing. Arai's book intended to generate enough money to pay back the yakuza. In conversations with Hayabusa, Arai brought up plans to kill himself, because his life insurance would pay off his debt to the yakuza.

== Death ==
On May 16, 2002, an early morning jogger found Arai hanging by his necktie in Tokyo's Mizumoto Park. Arai's suicide resulted in a life insurance payment to his ex-wife and child. However, the life insurance payment did not cover all of Arai's debt. The Arai family continued paying his debt to the yakuza for years, until his ex-wife's father paid the remaining balance.

Shoichi Arai was buried at Saitama Kawaguchi Memorial Garden. Arai's gravestone includes an engraved FMW logo.

On September 30, 2021, Arai was featured in the Dark Side of the Ring episode "Blood & Wire: Onita’s FMW".
