= Hiromichi Fuyuki =

Japanese professional wrestler

Personal information
- Born: May 11, 1960 Tokyo, Japan
- Died: March 19, 2003 (aged 42) Yokohama, Japan
- Cause of death: Intestinal cancer
- Spouse: Kaoru Fuyuki (m. 1986)

Professional wrestling career
- Ring name(s): Kodo Fuyuki; Ricky Fuyuki; Samson Fuyuki; Hiromichi Fuyuki; Masamichi Fuyuki
- Billed height: 1.83 m (6 ft 0 in)
- Billed weight: 109 kg (240 lb)
- Trained by: Isao Yoshihara
- Debut: May 4, 1980
- Retired: April 14, 2002

Hiromichi Fuyuki (冬木 弘道, Fuyuki Hiromichi) (May 11, 1960 – March 19, 2003) was a Japanese professional wrestler and promoter better known by his ring name Kodo Fuyuki (冬木 弘道, Fuyuki Kōdō) best known for his time in All Japan Pro Wrestling (AJPW), Frontier Martial-Arts Wrestling (FMW), New Japan Pro-Wrestling (NJPW), Wrestle Association R (WAR) and other Japanese and international promotions during the 1980s and 1990s as the leader of 6-man tag team Fuyuki-Gun with Gedo and Jado.

He is also known as a mainstay of FMW where he was the arch rival of the company's top star Hayabusa and a founding member of the stable Team No Respect included Kintaro Kanemura, Hideki Hosaka, Masao Orihara, Tetsuhiro Kuroda, Mr. Gannosuke, Koji Nakagawa, Horace Boulder, Super Leather, Hido, Gedo and Jado.

== Career ==
=== International Pro Wrestling / International Wrestling Enterprise (1980) ===
Trained by Isao Yoshihara, Hiromichi Fuyuki made his professional wrestling debut in International Pro Wrestling on May 4, 1980, one week before his 20th birthday. Three months later, IWE folded, and Fuyuki applied to the All Japan Pro Wrestling Dojo.

=== All Japan Pro Wrestling (1981-1990) ===
In August 1981, after spending a year training in the dojo, he made his debut in All Japan Pro Wrestling. In November 1984, he went on an excursion of North America, where he made stops in Mexico, Puerto Rico, and San Antonio, Texas, where he wrestled under the name Ricky Fuyuki, in honor of his childhood idol, Riki Choshu. He would also wrestle in Memphis under the name Mr. Helo, teaming with "Mr. Shima, and was managed by Tojo Yamamoto.

In December 1985, he returned to AJPW, under the name Samson Fuyuki, and began teaming with Toshiaki Kawada, under the team name "Footloose". As members of Genichiro Tenryu's Revolution Army, Footloose captured the All Asia Tag Team Championship three times between March 9, 1988 and October 20, 1989.

Footloose would disband in April 1990, as Kawada teamed with Tiger Mask II, who would later unmask, revealing himself as Mitsuharu Misawa, during a match on May 14, where Fuyuki teamed with Yoshiaki Yatsu.

=== Super World of Sports (1990-1992) ===
One of several wrestlers to leave AJPW with Genichiro Tenryu in July 1990, Fuyuki competed in Tenryu's rival promotion Super World of Sports under his real name, also appearing on interpromotional shows for the World Wrestling Federation, with little to no impact.

=== Wrestle And Romance / Wrestle Association R (1992-1996) ===
Following the closing of SWS in June 1992, Fuyuki followed Tenryu to WAR. While there, he became one of the top wrestlers and was the main heel.

In August 1993, Fuyuki was invited by New Japan Pro-Wrestling to participate in the G1 Climax tournament; he defeated Takayuki Iizuka in the first round, but lost to Masahiro Chono in the quarterfinals. In 1994, he would make a brief stint in EMLL in Mexico, once again under the name Samson Fuyuki, feuding with Vampiro.

In early 1994, he started teaming with Jado and Gedo as Fuyuki-Gun, with whom he held the WAR World Six-Man Tag Team Championship five times between June 1994 and June 1996, as well as a single reign with UWFI's Yoji Anjo and ECW's Bam Bam Bigelow in October 1996. Lionheart also became a member of Fuyuki-Gun, during their stint in WAR.

=== Freelance (1996-1997) ===
Upon leaving WAR in October 1996, he wrestled briefly as a freelancer, wrestling in various promotions such as Frontier Martial-Arts Wrestling, Big Japan Pro Wrestling, and International Wrestling Association of Japan. Around this time, he started using a shorter variation of his real name, Kodo Fuyuki.

=== Frontier Martial-Arts Wrestling ===
==== Fuyuki-Gun (1997) ====
After spending over four months freelancing, Fuyuki found a new home in Frontier Martial-Arts Wrestling in February 1997. Fuyuki-Gun made their FMW debut on February 19 by defeating W*ING Alliance members W*ING Kanemura, Hideki Hosaka and Dragon Winger. Fuyuki-Gun initially performed as freelancers on the Japanese independent circuit until they began competing full time for FMW. They appeared at the 8th Anniversary Show, where they defeated Hisakatsu Oya and The Headhunters in a street fight. Fuyuki began feuding with Terry Funk, the leader of Funk Masters of Wrestling, which culminated in a loser leaves FMW match between the two at Fall Spectacular, which Fuyuki lost. As a result, he was forced to leave FMW. He began promoting his own shows under the "Fuyuki Army" banner.

He began competing for FMW full-time on November 15, when Fuyuki-Gun defeated ZEN members Hido, The Gladiator and The Great Fake. They ceased appearing for other promotions and established themselves as a villainous group and entered a rivalry with Atsushi Onita and his ZEN group.

==== Team No Respect (1998–1999) ====
In 1998, Fuyuki formed Team No Respect with several of FMW's leading wrestlers which remained the dominant "heel" stable until its disbandment in June 2000. From there, he formed multiple stables, which didn't last as long.

==== WEW World Heavyweight Champion (2000–2002) ====
He became the head "booker" of the promotion in 1999. Attempting to distance the promotion from its earlier reputation for "garbage wrestling" style, he instead focused more on a "sports entertainment" approach based heavily on comedic storylines and characters similar to American promotions such as World Wrestling Entertainment.

The beginning of the end for FMW was realized after its top star Hayabusa suffered a career-ending injury in October 2001; to make matters worse, Mr. Gannosuke injured both his ankles in January 2002. With Hayabusa and Gannosuke gone, Fuyuki was finally forced to close the promotion in March 2002, one month after it filed for bankruptcy.

=== World Entertainment Wrestling (2002) ===
Soon after the close of FMW, Fuyuki opened his own promotion, World Entertainment Wrestling, and briefly appeared in WEW before announcing his retirement after being diagnosed with cancer.

Wrestling his last match at a retirement show held by Pro Wrestling Noah, Fuyuki teamed with Yoshinari Ogawa & Mitsuharu Misawa to defeat Tamon Honda, Masao Inoue & Tsuyoshi Kikuchi on April 14, 2002.

== Death ==
Although continuing to promote events for WEW during the next year, he planned to come out of retirement and had been scheduled to face Shinya Hashimoto before his death. Fuyuki died at approximately 6:50pm on March 19, 2003, after an almost year long battle with intestinal cancer. Fuyuki was perhaps the only wrestler to participate in a match posthumously, as the planned barbed wire deathmatch with Hashimoto indeed went ahead, with Kintaro Kanemura taking Fuyuki's place. After a ceremony in Kawasaki stadium honouring Fuyuki, Hashimoto clutched an urn containing Fuyuki's ashes, and he and Kanemura flung themselves into the barbed wire, both giving Fuyuki a final victory.

Fuyuki was survived by his wife Kaoru, whom he married in November 1986, and his two daughters. Under his associate Kintaro Kanemura, the promotion reorganized in 2004 as Apache Pro-Wrestling Army, but continued the WEW titles.

== Championships and accomplishments ==
- All Japan Pro Wrestling
  - All Asia Tag Team Championship (3 times) - with Toshiaki Kawada
- Frontier Martial-Arts Wrestling - World Entertainment Wrestling
  - FMW Brass Knuckles Heavyweight Championship (1 time)
  - FMW Brass Knuckles Tag Team Championship (2 times) - with Hido and Yukihiro Kanemura
  - FMW Independent Heavyweight Championship (1 time)
  - FMW World Street Fight 6-Man Tag Team Championship (3 times) - with Gedo and Jado (1), Hido and Yukihiro Kanemura (1), and Koji Nakagawa and Yukihiro Kanemura (1)
  - WEW 6-Man Tag Team Championship (5 times) - with Koji Nakagawa and Gedo (1), Kyoko Inoue and Chocoball Mukai (2), and Mr. Gannosuke and Shinjuku-zame (2)
  - WEW World Heavyweight Championship (3 times)
  - WEW World Tag Team Championship (3 times) - with Kyoko Inoue, Tetsuhiro Kuroda and The Sandman
  - WEW 6-Man Tag Team Championship Tournament (1999) - with Koji Nakagawa and Gedo
- Pro Wrestling Illustrated
  - Ranked #119 of the 500 top wrestlers in the PWI 500 in 2000
  - Ranked #379 of the 500 best singles wrestlers during the "PWI Years" in 2003
  - Ranked #69 of the 100 best tag team of the "PWI Years" with Toshiaki Kawada
- Tokyo Sports
  - Fighting Spirit Award (1995)
  - Outstanding Performance Award (1998)
  - Service Award (2003)
- Wrestling and Romance / Wrestle Association R
  - WAR World Six-Man Tag Team Championship (6 times) - with Jado and Gedo (5), and Yoji Anjo and Bam Bam Bigelow (1)
  - WAR World Six-Man Tag Team Championship Tournament (1994) - with Jado and Gedo

== See also ==
- List of premature professional wrestling deaths
