= Hisakatsu Oya =

Japanese professional wrestler (born 1964)

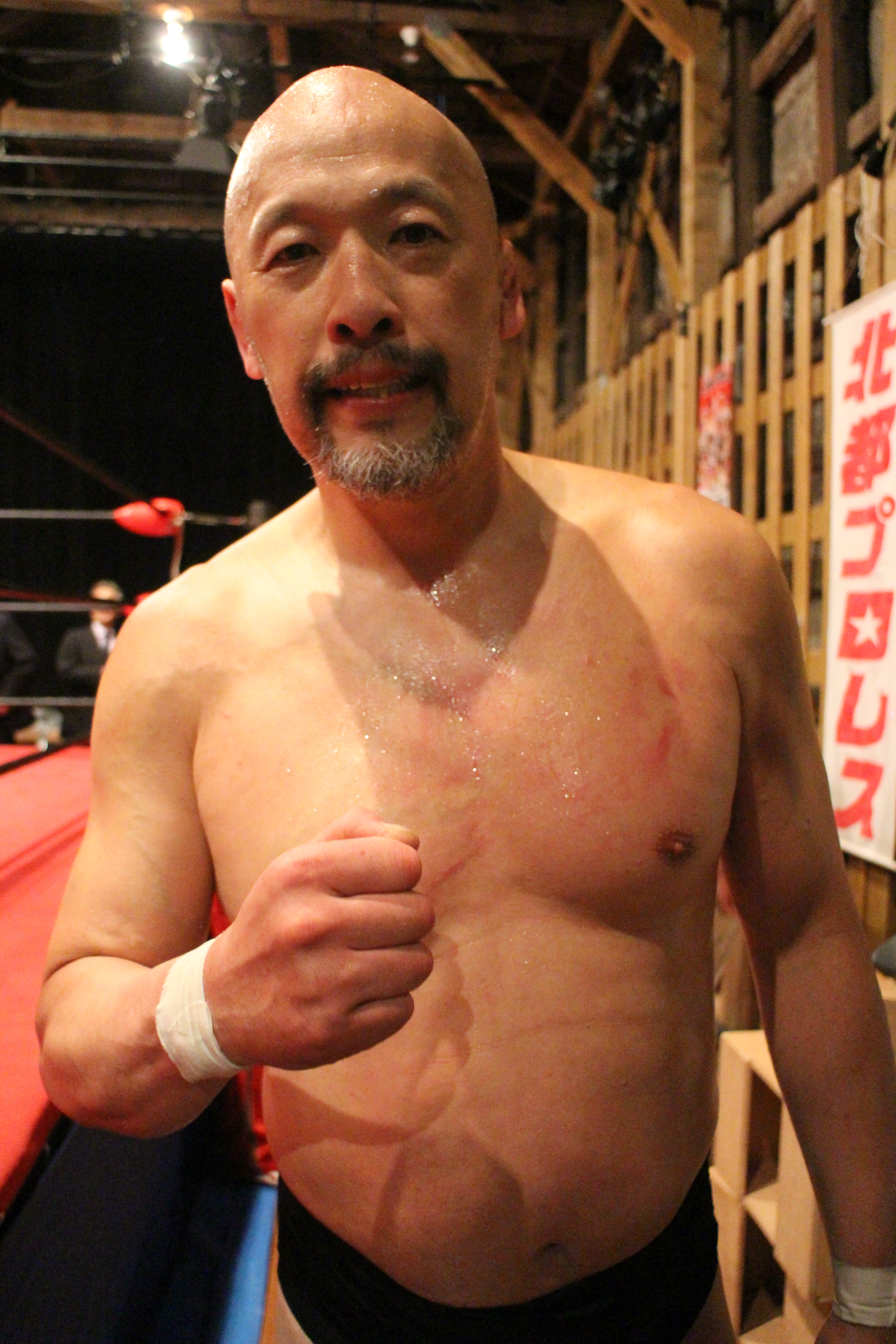
- Oya in 2015

Personal information
- Born: Kenichi Oya; July 2, 1964 (age 62) Kanazawa, Ishikawa, Japan

Professional wrestling career
- Ring name(s): HISAKATSU; Hisakatsu Oya; Kenichi Oya; The Jaguar
- Billed height: 1.85 m (6 ft 1 in)
- Billed weight: 105 kg (231 lb)
- Trained by: NJPW Dojo
- Debut: April 20, 1986

Hisakatsu Oya (大矢剛功, Ōya Hisakatsu; born Kenichi Oya (大矢健一, Ōya Ken'ichi); July 2, 1964) is a semi-retired Japanese professional wrestler. Although he started out for New Japan Pro-Wrestling, he is well known for his stint in Frontier Martial-Arts Wrestling.

== Career ==
=== New Japan Pro-Wrestling (1986–1989) ===
Kenichi Oya trained at the NJPW Dojo. He made his wrestling debut in April 1986, against Masahiro Chono. During his tenure in New Japan, Oya also teamed with the likes of Kensuke Sasaki and Osamu Matsuda, and donned the persona of The Jaguar in 1988 to team with Shinji Sasazaki's persona of "The Tiger". However, due to injuries, he retired in 1989.

=== Super World of Sports (1990–1992) ===
After a hiatus, Oya joined Super World of Sports in July 1990. Oya would not only wrestle his fellow SWS comrades, he would also wrestle against stars from the World Wrestling Federation as well. In January 1992, he teamed up with Kendo Nagasaki for a tournament to determine the first SWS Tag Team Champions, which was won by Yoshiaki Yatsu and Haku. In June 1992, SWS shut down.

=== Network Of Wrestling (1992–1993) ===
After SWS shut down, Oya joined Kendo Nagasaki's Network Of Wrestling. He didn't make much of an impact there, so he left in November 1993.

=== Frontier Martial-Arts Wrestling (1993–2002) ===
Oya made his debut in Frontier Martial-Arts Wrestling in November 1993, under the name Hisakatsu Oya. Unlike his previous stints in NJPW, SWS, and NOW, Oya found his niche. Over the course of a year, Oya proved his worth in FMW, battling the likes of Battle Ranger, Masato Tanaka, Mitsuhiro Matsunaga, and Atsushi Onita.

In April 1995, he formed Lethal Weapon with Tarzan Goto and Ricky Fuji, but Goto would leave FMW shortly thereafter. He and Fuji formed a tag team known as The Love Guns, and together they held the FMW Brass Knuckles Tag Team Championship once between May 1995 and September 1995. Oya and Fuji would also increase the numbers in Lethal Weapon by recruiting Mr. Pogo, The Gladiator, and Horace Boulder. In August 1995, during a round-robin tournament for the vacant FMW Brass Knuckles Heavyweight Championship, Oya fought Hayabusa to a 30-minute time-limit draw.

In September 1996, Lethal Weapon disbanded and Oya joined Funk Masters of Wrestling, where he formed a trio with The Headhunters and won the FMW World Street Fight 6-Man Tag Team Championship. After the Funk Masters disbanded, Oya decided to turn face for the first time in his career and join forces with Hayabusa. Up until the demise of FMW in February 2002, he fought alongside Hayabusa in his wars against Mr. Gannosuke and Kodo Fuyuki.

=== Freelance and semi-retirement (2002–present) ===
After FMW shut down, Oya occasionally wrestles from time to time, as many considered him semi-retired. When he did wrestle, he wrestled for many promotions, such as Wrestling Marvelous Future, Fighting World of Japan Pro Wrestling, and Osaka Pro Wrestling. During his stint in WMF, he developed a Puerto Rican assassin gimmick named HISAKATSU.

Oya runs his own promotion called Hokuto Pro Wrestling.

== Personal life and reputation ==
During his retirement in the late 1980s, he was a sports instructor before coming out of retirement in 1990.

Oya has been one of the most underrated wrestlers in Japan, as well as one of the best technical wrestlers in the world. His ring psychology and submission wrestling is second-to-none, similar to Jake Roberts. As a sneaky heel, he chose not to taunt the crowd and to remain unpredictable to his opponents.

== Championships and accomplishments ==
- Frontier Martial-Arts Wrestling

- FMW Brass Knuckles Tag Team Championship (4 times) – with Mr. Pogo (1), Ricky Fuji (1), Horace Boulder (1), and Mr. Gannosuke (1)
- FMW World Street Fight 6-Man Tag Team Championship (3 times) – with The Headhunters (1), The Gladiator and Mr. Gannosuke (1), and Hayabusa and Masato Tanaka (1)
- WEW 6-Man Tag Team Championship (3 times) – with Masato Tanaka and Tetsuhiro Kuroda (1), Hayabusa and Tetsuhiro Kuroda (1), and Ricky Fuji and Flying Kid Ichihara (1)
- WEW Tag Team Championship (1 time) - with Tetsuhiro Kuroda
- FMW World Street Fight 6-Man Tag Team Championship Tournament (1997) – with The Gladiator and Mr. Gannosuke
