= Super Extreme Wrestling War =

- Promotion: Frontier Martial-Arts Wrestling
- Date: December 19, 1997–December 22, 1997
- Attendance: 15,300 (combined)

Super Extreme Wrestling War was a series of professional wrestling events produced by Frontier Martial-Arts Wrestling (FMW) in 1997. These events marked the first time that FMW began a partnership with American counterpart Extreme Championship Wrestling (ECW) and a working relationship began between the two companies as ECW wrestlers competed at these events and it marked the beginning of interpromotional matches and events between ECW and FMW. These events would create a huge impact in FMW's storylines as they concluded with the breakup of ZEN when Mr. Gannosuke, Yukihiro Kanemura and Hido attacked their leader Atsushi Onita out of jealousy after Hayabusa pinned Onita in a WarGames match. They merged with Fuyuki-Gun to form Team No Respect, which would dominate FMW until 2000.

== Dates, venues and main events ==
Day:	Date:	Venue:	Location:	Main event:
1	December 19, 1997	Komazawa Gymnasium	Tokyo, Japan	Masato Tanaka vs. Atsushi Onita
2	December 20, 1997	Osaka Seaside Sports Center	Osaka, Japan	Atsushi Onita, Tetsuhiro Kuroda and Hido vs. Hayabusa, Masato Tanaka and Hisakatsu Oya
3	December 21, 1997	Aichi Prefectural Gymnasium	Nagoya, Japan	Masato Tanaka vs. Yukihiro Kanemura
4	December 22, 1997	Korakuen Hall	Tokyo, Japan	Hayabusa, Jinsei Shinzaki and Masato Tanaka vs. Atsushi Onita, Mr. Gannosuke and Yukihiro Kanemura

== Background ==
=== Production ===
The tour marked the beginning of a talent exchange working agreement between ECW and FMW which would last throughout the existence of both promotions. The theme of the tour was that ECW wrestlers would work matches on all of the shows on the tour. The tour also featured the return of FMW wrestlers, who were part of ECW roster at the time, Terry Funk and Sabu as ECW wrestlers. Funk had been the leader of Funk Masters of Wrestling and was returning the company for the first time since beating Kodo Fuyuki at Kawasaki Legend: Fall Spectacular and Sabu was returning since losing to Hayabusa at Summer Spectacular in 1994.

=== Storylines ===
At Kawasaki Legend: Fall Spectacular, Atsushi Onita defeated W*ING Kanemura in a no rope barbed wire electrified dynamite land mine time bomb death match which stipulated that if Onita lost, he would retire and if Kanemura lost, then W*ING Alliance must disband. After the match, W*ING Alliance members Kanemura, Hideki Hosaka and Hido were concerned because no group in FMW would accept them. Onita became upset at FMW's team of Hayabusa, Masato Tanaka and Koji Nakagawa for being rude to Kanemura, Hosaka and Hido and then he met Kanemura in his ambulance to conduct a meeting with the former W*ING members. On September 30, Onita held a press conference in which he turned villain for the first time in his FMW career by denouncing himself as a FMW wrestler and formed ZEN with the former W*ING Alliance and FMW's upstart Tetsuhiro Kuroda. A rivalry blossomed between FMW and ZEN and the Funk Masters of Wrestling was quickly phased out after Mr. Gannosuke, Hisakatsu Oya and The Gladiator ended it due to the group's leader Terry Funk leaving FMW and they joined ZEN. On November 20, Masato Tanaka, Ricky Fuji and Mr. Pogo #2 defeated ZEN's Atsushi Onita, Tetsuhiro Kuroda and Hido in a six-man tag team match when Tanaka pinned Onita, leading to a match between the two on the first show of the Super Extreme Wrestling War tour on December 19.

At 8th Anniversary Show, Hayabusa defeated Mr. Gannosuke in a mask vs. hair match and then attempted to reconcile with Gannosuke but Gannosuke attacked him and attempted to blow fire on him until Hayabusa's ally Jinsei Shinzaki made the save, thus forming an alliance with Hayabusa and beginning to feud with Gannosuke. On June 21, Gannosuke attacked Shinzaki under a Hayabusa disguise during Shinzaki's entrance before a match at a Michinoku Pro Wrestling show. On July 19, Gannosuke, Hisakatsu Oya and The Gladiator defeated Hayabusa, Shinzaki and Koji Nakagawa in a six-man tag team match. On August 25, Gannosuke, Gladiator and Super Leather defeated the team of Shinzaki, Ricky Fuji and Ricky Morton in a barbed wire tornado deathmatch. On October 14, Gannosuke attacked Shinzaki from behind before a match between the two and then easily defeated him by making him bleed. On October 19, Gannosuke, along with Hisakatsu Oya left Funk Masters of Wrestling and joined ZEN after losing the FMW Brass Knuckles Tag Team Championship to ZEN's Atsushi Onita and Yukihiro Kanemura. The title would be vacated due to Onita's inactivity. On November 28, Gannosuke and Yukihiro Kanemura defeated Hayabusa and Masato Tanaka to win the vacant title. On December 5, Gannosuke stole Shinzaki's clothes and wore them during a tag team match pitting him and Hideki Hosaka against Shinzaki and Ricky Fuji, which Gannosuke and Hosaka won. This set up a title defense for Gannosuke and Kanemura against Hayabusa and Shinzaki on the December 19 show of the tour.

Other important changes in the FMW roster took place in December as Hisakatsu Oya quit ZEN after losing to Hayabusa on December 5 and Koji Nakagawa walked out on FMW after feeling betrayed by Shoichi Arai for not been given major opportunities which had been promised to him in the past.

== Events ==
=== Day 1 ===
Super Extreme Wrestling War
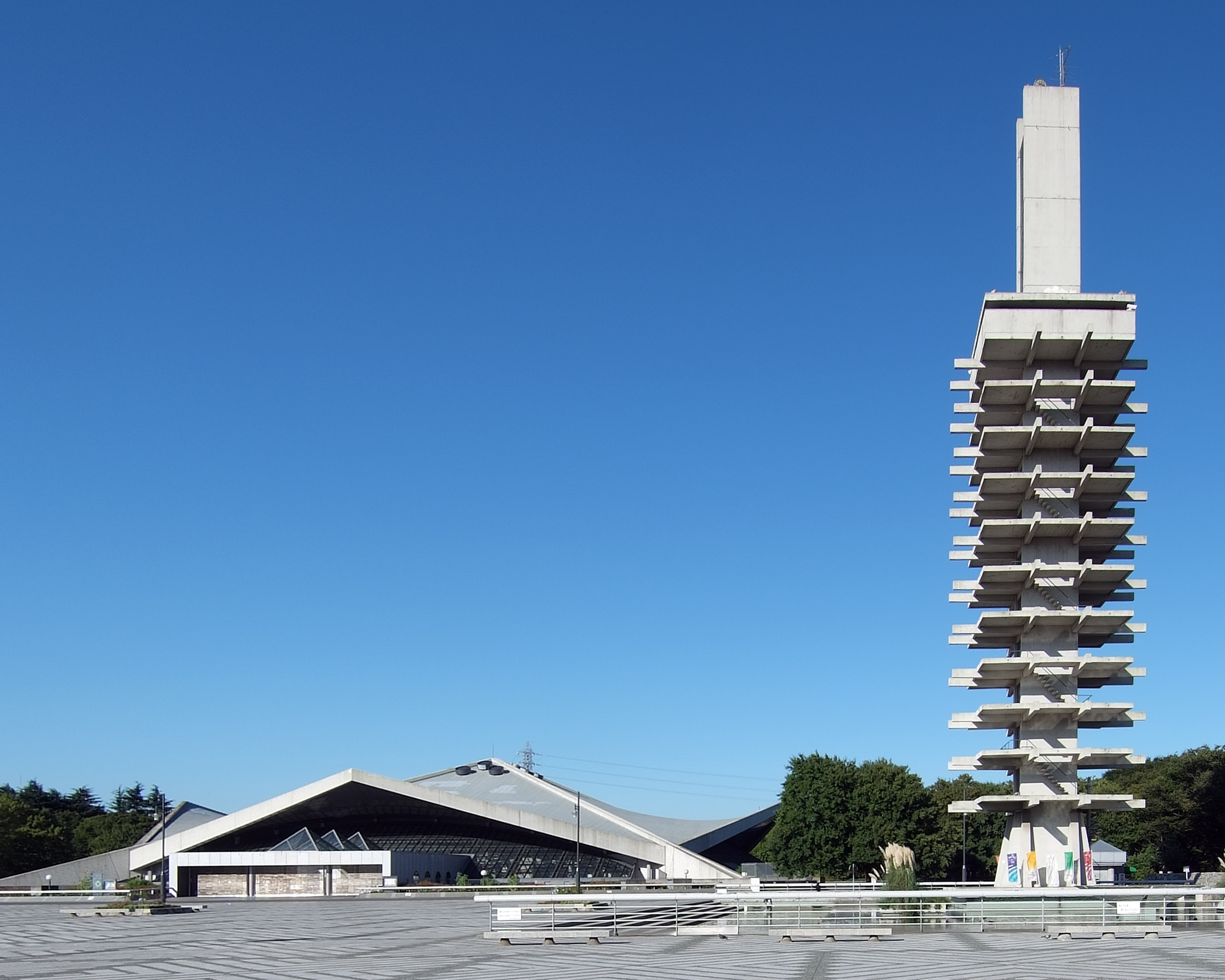
- Promotion: Frontier Martial-Arts Wrestling
- Date: December 19, 1997
- City: Tokyo, Japan
- Venue: Komazawa Gymnasium
- Attendance: 5,200

The first show of the Super Extreme Wrestling War took place on December 19, 1997, at the Komazawa Gymnasium in Tokyo, Japan. It was the first event in FMW history to host Extreme Championship Wrestling's (ECW) roster in FMW and marked the beginning of the talent exchange between FMW and ECW wrestlers which would see wrestlers from both companies appear in interpromotional matches. In the first match, Fuyuki-Gun (Kodo Fuyuki, Jado and Gedo) defeated ZEN members defeated Tetsuhiro Kuroda, Hido and The Great Fake when Fuyuki performed a Lariat on Hido. Aja Kong defeated Shark Tsuchiya with a Uraken. D-Von Dudley from ECW defeated Ricky Fuji with a Dudley Death Drop from Dudley Boyz and ZEN's The Gladiator defeated ECW's Tommy Dreamer with a Super Awesome Bomb. The event marked the return of the former leader of Funk Masters of Wrestling Terry Funk to FMW as an ECW wrestler. He defeated The Sandman and Buh Buh Ray Dudley in a three-way dance. Mr. Gannosuke and Yukihiro Kanemura retained the FMW Brass Knuckles Tag Team Championship against Hayabusa and Jinsei Shinzaki when Kanemura hit a diving Hayabusa in his injured ribs with his knee and then rolled him up to win the match. The main event of the show featured the Brass Knuckles Heavyweight Champion and the Independent Heavyweight Champion Masato Tanaka competing against ZEN leader Atsushi Onita in a non-title match, stemming from Tanaka pinning Onita in a match. Onita defeated Tanaka in the match. A dissension took place within ZEN as Onita booked himself in the main event while Mr. Gannosuke and Yukihiro Kanemura grew upset as they thought that their FMW Brass Knuckles Tag Team Championship match deserved to be the main event of the show as they had become popular villains of FMW. A clash occurred within ZEN.

No.	Results	Stipulations	Times
1	Fuyuki-Gun (Kodo Fuyuki, Jado and Gedo) defeated Tetsuhiro Kuroda, Hido and The Great Fake	Six-man tag team match	6:46
2	Aja Kong defeated Shark Tsuchiya	Singles match	13:02
3	D-Von Dudley defeated Ricky Fuji	Singles match	8:09
4	The Gladiator defeated Tommy Dreamer	Singles match	9:52
5	Terry Funk defeated The Sandman and Buh Buh Ray Dudley	Three-Way Dance	6:32
6	Mr. Gannosuke and Yukihiro Kanemura (c) defeated Hayabusa and Jinsei Shinzaki	Tag team match for the FMW Brass Knuckles Tag Team Championship	17:49
7	Atsushi Onita defeated Masato Tanaka	Singles match	20:07
(c) / – the champion(s) heading into the match

Three-Way Dance eliminations

Wrestler:	Eliminated by:	Elimination move:	Time:
The Sandman	Buh Buh Ray Dudley	Dudley Death Drop	6:32
Buh Buh Ray Dudley	Terry Funk	DDT	8:18
Winner:	Terry Funk		

=== Day 2 ===
Super Extreme Wrestling War
- Promotion: Frontier Martial-Arts Wrestling
- Date: December 20, 1997
- City: Osaka, Japan
- Venue: Osaka Seaside Sports Center
- Attendance: 3,600

The second show of the tour took place on December 20, 1997, at the Osaka Seaside Sports Center in Osaka, Japan. It drew an attendance of 3,600. In the opening match, Ricky Fuji defeated Flying Kid Ichihara with a Brainbuster. Kaori Nakayama and Miwa Sato defeated Toxic Corps (Crusher Maedomari and Miss Mongol) when Nakayama pinned Mongol with a la magistral, leading to a rematch between the two teams on the next show. Jinsei Shinzaki made Mr. Pogo #2 submit to a Gokuraku-gatame. Fuyuki-Gun leader Kodo Fuyuki continued his rivalry with ZEN by defeating ZEN member Hideki Hosaka as The Great Fake, with a running lariat. Extreme Championship Wrestling's (ECW) Dudley Boyz (Buh Buh Ray and D-Von) fought Jado and Gedo to a no contest. ZEN's The Gladiator, Mr. Gannosuke and Yukihiro Kanemura defeated ECW's Terry Funk, The Sandman and Tommy Dreamer when Gannosuke pinned his former Funk Masters of Wrestling leader Funk with a Gannosuke Clutch. In the main event, Hayabusa, Masato Tanaka and former ZEN member Hisakatsu Oya defeated ZEN's Atsushi Onita, Tetsuhiro Kuroda and Hido to win the FMW World Street Fight 6-Man Tag Team Championship.

No.	Results	Stipulations	Times
1	Ricky Fuji defeated Flying Kid Ichihara	Singles match	11:48
2	Kaori Nakayama and Miwa Sato defeated Toxic Corps (Crusher Maedomari and Miss Mongol)	Tag team match	10:19
3	Jinsei Shinzaki defeated Mr. Pogo #2 via submission	Singles match	8:36
4	Kodo Fuyuki defeated The Great Fake	Singles match	8:44
5	Dudley Boyz (Buh Buh Ray and D-Von) vs. Jado and Gedo ended in a no contest	Tag team match	17:48
6	ZEN (The Gladiator, Mr. Gannosuke and Yukihiro Kanemura) defeated Terry Funk, The Sandman and Tommy Dreamer	Six-man tag team match	13:48
7	Hayabusa, Masato Tanaka and Hisakatsu Oya defeated ZEN (Atsushi Onita, Tetsuhiro Kuroda and Hido) (c)	Six-man tag team match for the FMW World Street Fight 6-Man Tag Team Championship	17:52
(c) / – the champion(s) heading into the match

=== Day 3 ===
Super Extreme Wrestling War
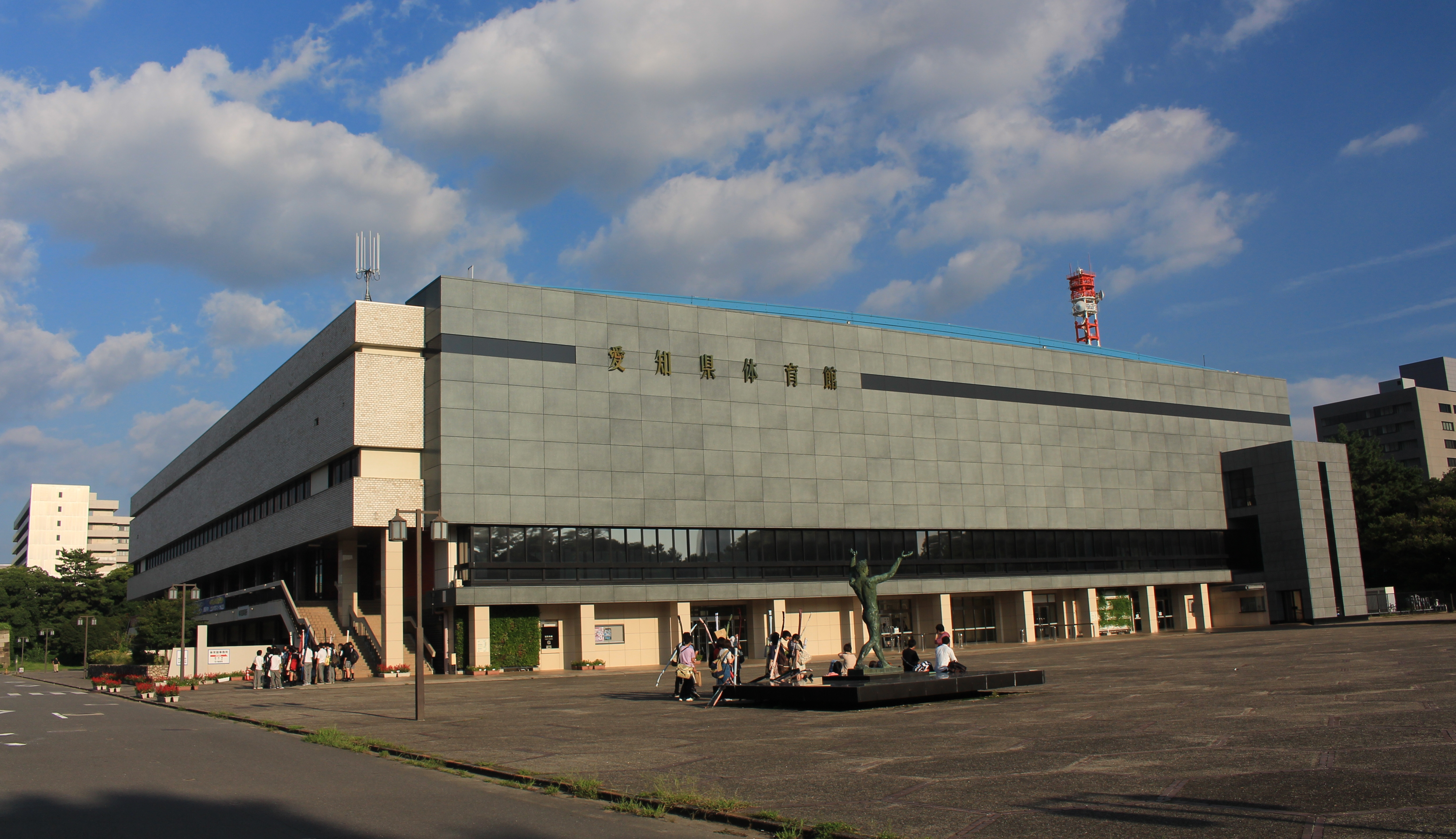
- Promotion: Frontier Martial-Arts Wrestling
- Date: December 21, 1997
- City: Nagoya, Aichi, Japan
- Venue: Aichi Prefectural Gymnasium
- Attendance: 4,350

The third show took place on December 21, 1997, at the Aichi Prefectural Gymnasium in Nagoya, Aichi, Japan. The event drew a crowd of 4,350 people. Hideki Hosaka defeated newcomer Yoshinori Sasaki by making him submit to a one-legged Boston crab. Toxic Corps (Crusher Maedomari and Miss Mongol) defeated Kaori Nakayama and Miwa Sato in a rematch from the previous show when Maedomari delivered a Nodowa Otoshi to Sato. Jinsei Shinzaki gained a submission victory over Flying Kid Ichihara with a Gokuraku-gatame. Fuyuki-Gun (Kodo Fuyuki, Jado and Gedo) defeated the FMW team of Hayabusa, Ricky Fuji and Mr. Pogo #2 when Fuyuki delivered a running lariat to Pogo #2. Mr. Gannosuke defeated his former tag team partner Hisakatsu Oya with a Gannosuke Clutch. Extreme Championship Wrestling's (ECW) Terry Funk, The Sandman, Tommy Dreamer and Dudley Boyz took on ZEN's Hido, Tetsuhiro Kuroda, The Gladiator, Atsushi Onita and The Great Fake in an interpromotional match which Funk won by pinning Hido with a small package. In the main event, Masato Tanaka successfully defended the FMW Brass Knuckles Heavyweight Championship and the FMW Independent Heavyweight Championship against ZEN's Yukihiro Kanemura by performing a Roaring Elbow.

No.	Results	Stipulations	Times
1	Hideki Hosaka defeated Yoshinori Sasaki via submission	Singles match	6:21
2	Toxic Corps (Crusher Maedomari and Miss Mongol) defeated Kaori Nakayama and Miwa Sato	Tag team match	12:16
3	Jinsei Shinzaki defeated Flying Kid Ichihara via submission	Singles match	8:49
4	Fuyuki-Gun (Kodo Fuyuki, Jado and Gedo) defeated Hayabusa, Ricky Fuji and Mr. Pogo #2	Six-man tag team match	13:42
5	Mr. Gannosuke defeated Hisakatsu Oya	Singles match	16:07
6	Team ECW (Terry Funk, The Sandman, Tommy Dreamer and Dudley Boyz (Buh Buh Ray and D-Von)) defeated ZEN (Hido, Tetsuhiro Kuroda, The Gladiator, Atsushi Onita and The Great Fake)	Ten-man tag team match	15:57
7	Masato Tanaka (c) defeated Yukihiro Kanemura	Singles match for the FMW Brass Knuckles Heavyweight Championship and the FMW Independent Heavyweight Championship	15:00
(c) / – the champion(s) heading into the match

=== Day 4 ===
Super Extreme Wrestling War
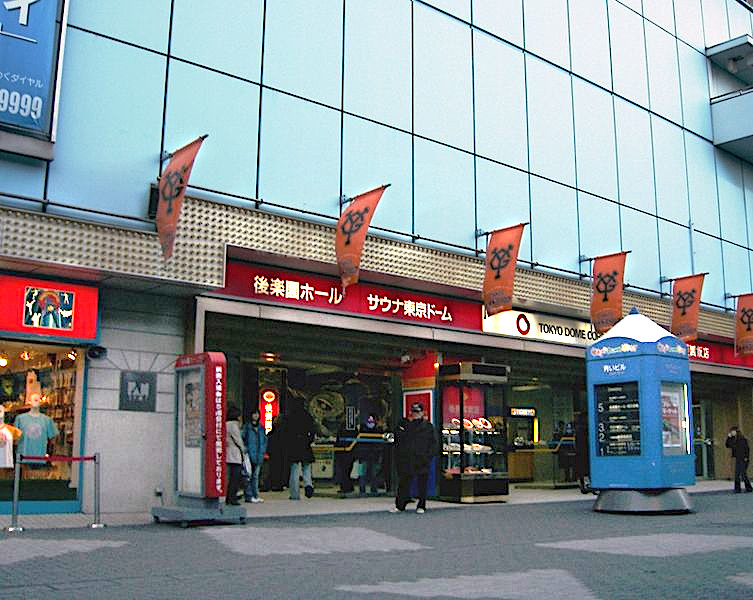
- Promotion: Frontier Martial-Arts Wrestling
- Date: December 22, 1997
- City: Tokyo, Japan
- Venue: Korakuen Hall
- Attendance: 2,150

The final show of the Super Extreme Wrestling War tour took on December 22, 1997, at the historic Korakuen Hall in Tokyo, Japan. The show drew a crowd of 2,150 and marked the conclusion of Extreme Championship Wrestling's (ECW) tour in FMW. Mr. Pogo #2 defeated Yoshinori Sasaki in the opening match with a body scissors. Miss Mongol and Miwa Sato competed in a match after exchanging wins in tag team matches during the previous two shows. Mongol won the match with a diving senton. Former Brass Knuckles Tag Team Champions Hisakatsu Oya and Ricky Fuji teamed with each other as FMW members for the first time in over a year in an unofficial reunion against ZEN's Tetsuhiro Kuroda and The Great Fake. Fake pinned Fuji with a small package. ECW had an exhibition match in which former FMW wrestler Sabu returned to the company, having competed for the last time in a loss to Hayabusa at Summer Spectacular in 1994. He defeated The Sandman with an Arabian Facebuster. Terry Funk and Tommy Dreamer defeated Dudley Boyz and ZEN members The Gladiator and Hido in a three-Way dance. The main event was an important match in FMW history as it concluded the rivalry between FMW and ZEN. Hayabusa, Jinsei Shinzaki and Masato Tanaka took on ZEN's Atsushi Onita, Mr. Gannosuke and Yukihiro Kanemura in a WarGames barbed wire baseball bat ladder cage match. Gannosuke and Kanemura separated themselves from Onita and did not help him throughout the match and Hayabusa won it by performing a Moonsault from the top of the steel cage, which he had failed to execute during his match against Onita at the 6th Anniversary Show. After the match, Gannosuke and Kanemura attacked Onita until Koji Nakagawa made the rescue for him and forced Gannosuke and Kanemura to retreat and quit ZEN, along with Hido.

No.	Results	Stipulations	Times
1	Mr. Pogo #2 defeated Yoshinori Sasaki	Singles match	6:28
2	Miss Mongol defeated Miwa Sato	Singles match	9:33
3	Tetsuhiro Kuroda and The Great Fake defeated Hisakatsu Oya and Ricky Fuji	Tag team match	12:39
4	Sabu defeated The Sandman	Singles match	13:33
5	Terry Funk and Tommy Dreamer defeated Dudley Boyz (Buh Buh Ray and D-Von) and The Gladiator and Hido	Three-Way Dance	13:22
6	Hayabusa, Jinsei Shinzaki and Masato Tanaka defeated Atsushi Onita, Mr. Gannosuke and Yukihiro Kanemura	WarGames Barbed Wire Baseball Bat Ladder Cage match	17:52

Three-Way Dance eliminations

Wrestler:	Team:	Eliminated by:	Elimination move:	Time:
Hido	The Gladiator and Hido	Buh Buh Ray Dudley	Dudley Death Drop	7:59
D-Von Dudley	Dudley Boyz	Terry Funk	DDT	13:22
Winners:	Terry Funk and Tommy Dreamer			

== Aftermath ==
Koji Nakagawa was added into ZEN for helping Atsushi Onita to fend off the attack of Mr. Gannosuke and Yukihiro Kanemura and ZEN ended their feud with FMW and focused on feuding with the new freelance trio of Gannosuke, Kanemura and Hido. On January 6, 1998, Gannosuke defeated Masato Tanaka to win the Brass Knuckles Heavyweight Championship and the Independent Heavyweight Championship. The following night, ZEN promoted its first show, modeled after nWo Souled Out, which was headlined by ZEN's Onita, Nakagawa and Tetsuhiro Kuroda defeating Gannosuke, Kanemura and Hido. After the match, Gannoskue, Kanemura and Hido attacked ZEN and Fuyuki-Gun joined them in the assault and the two groups merged to form Team No Respect, which became the lead heel stable in FMW. Hayabusa won a tournament to become the #1 contender for the Double Championship and defeated Gannosuke for the title at the 9th Anniversary Show while Onita lost to TNR member Kodo Fuyuki.
