= ECW/FMW Supershow =

1998 Extreme Championship Wrestling and Frontier Martial-Arts Wrestling event

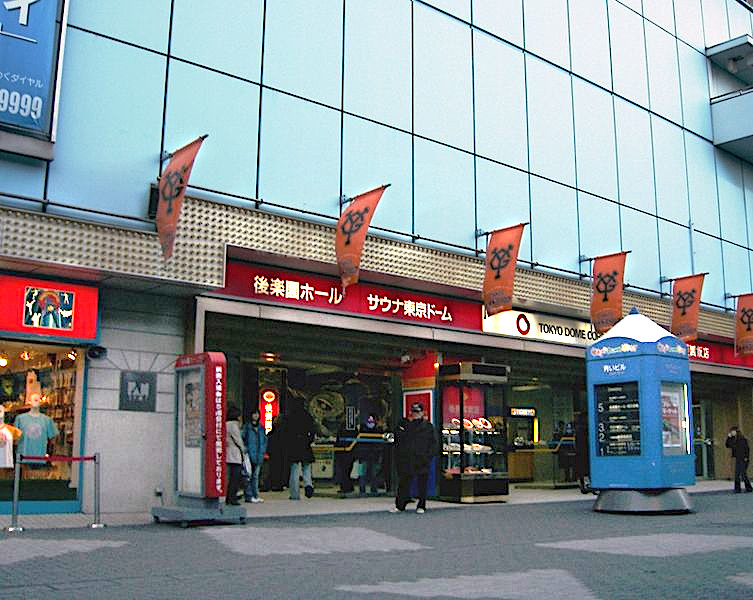
- Korakuen Hall
- Promotion(s): Frontier Martial-Arts Wrestling; Extreme Championship Wrestling
- Date: December 12, 1998; December 13, 1998 (aired December 13 and 16, 1998)
- City: Tokyo, Japan
- Venue: Korakuen Hall
- Attendance: 2,150 (December 12, 1998); 2,150 (December 13, 1998)

Pay-per-view chronology
← Previous; November to Remember (ECW); Scramble Survivor 1998: Day 6 (FMW)	Next → Guilty as Charged (ECW); New Year Generation 1999: Day 1 (FMW)

The ECW/FMW Supershow was a professional wrestling event jointly promoted by the Japan promotion Frontier Martial-Arts Wrestling (FMW) and the United States–based promotion Extreme Championship Wrestling (ECW) at Korakuen Hall in Tokyo, Japan on December 12 and 13, 1998.

Both shows aired live on pay-per-view (PPV) in Japan via DirecTV. Excerpts from the December 13 show aired on episode #295 of the syndicated television show ECW Hardcore TV in the United States on December 16, 1998. The December 13 show was also released on DVD.

== Background ==
The shows formed part of Frontier Martial-Arts Wrestling (FMW)'s December 1998 "Year End Sensation" tour. The event featured several matches from FMW's Over the Top tournament, which was held to determine the number one contender for the FMW Brass Knuckles and Independent Heavyweight Championships.

In a continuation of the working relationship between FMW and Extreme Championship Wrestling (ECW), ECW promoter Paul Heyman sent eight members of the ECW roster to participate on the 1998 Year End Sensation tour, including on the December 12 and 13 ECW/FMW Supershow events. During their visit, the ECW personnel visited the Ribera Steakhouse, a popular eatery amongst professional wrestlers. On December 11, Sabu, among other ECW and FMW wrestlers, attended a retirement ceremony for his uncle, The Sheik, held by Atsushi Onita in Korakuen Hall. On December 12, Sabu and his wife Mibu held a traditional Japanese wedding ceremony.

== December 12, 1998 ==
=== Event ===
The first show of the event was held on December 12, 1998, in Korakuen Hall in Tokyo, Japan. It was attended by 2,150 people.

The opening bout was a singles match between Team No Respect stablemates Hido and Takeshi Ono to determine who would advance past the first round of the Over the Top tournament. The match was won by Hido, who pinned Ono using a small package.

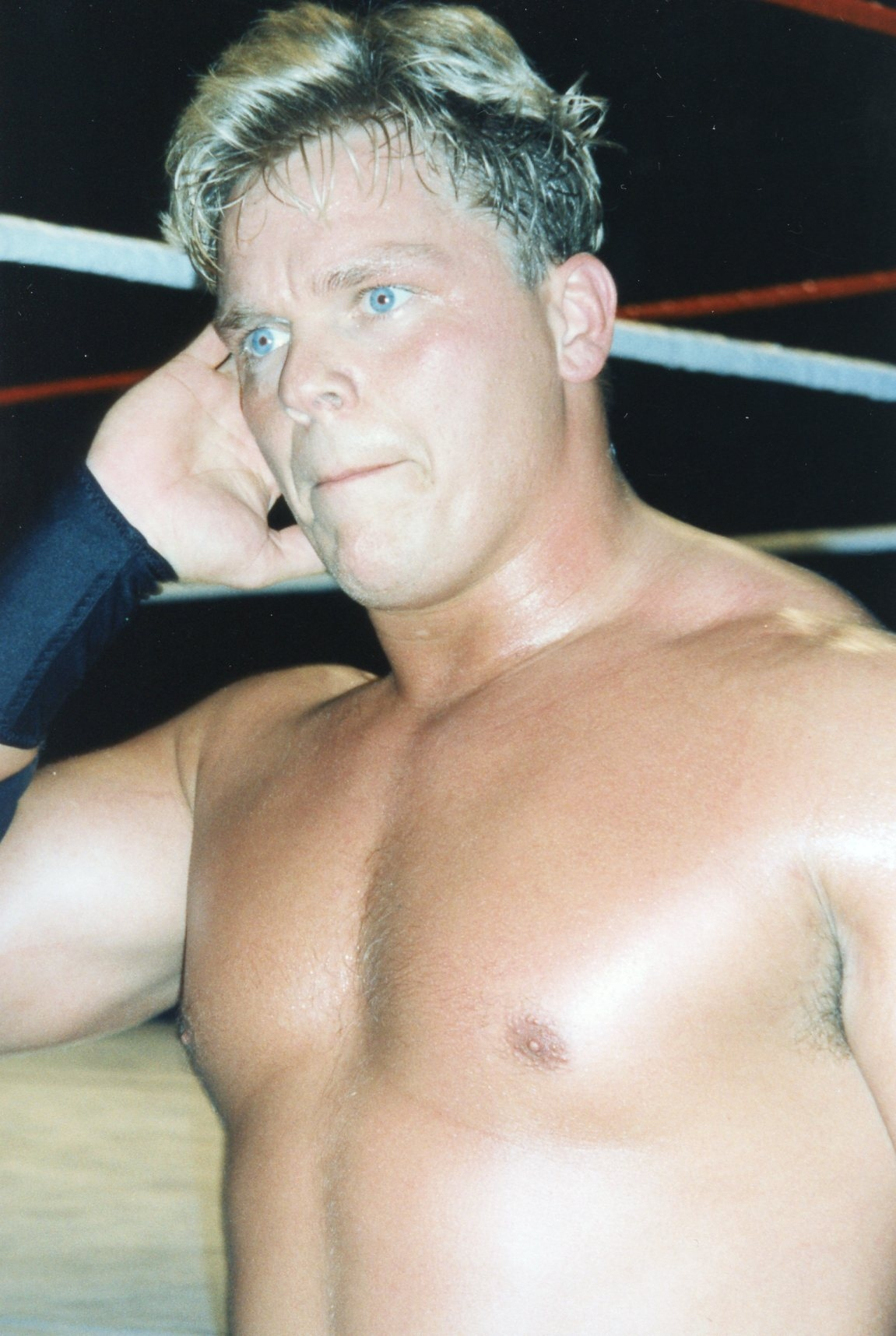
ECW World Heavyweight Champion Shane Douglas successfully defended his title at the December 12, 1998 event.

The second bout was a singles match between Masao Orihara and Ricky Fuji to determine who would advance past the first round of the Over the Top tournament. The match was won by Orihara, who pinned Ono using a small package.

The third bout was a three way dance between Hisakatsu Oya, Super Leather, and Yoshinori Sasaki. The match was won by Oya, who first eliminated Super Leather by throwing him over the top rope, then eliminated Sasaki by forcing him to submit using an octopus hold.

The fourth bout was a singles match between Kodo Fuyuki and Muhammad Yone, with Fuyuki pinning Yone following a lariat.

The fifth bout saw ECW World Tag Team Champions the Dudley Boyz defend their titles against Gosaku Goshogawara and Tetsuhiro Kuroda. The match was won by the Dudley Boyz, with D-Von Dudley pinning Goshogawara following a 3D.

The sixth bout was a singles match between Hideki Hosaka and Yukihiro Kanemura to determine who would advance past the first round of the Over the Top tournament. The match was won by Kanemura, who pinned Hosaka following a Blast Yama Special.

The seventh bout was a singles match between Koji Nakagawa and Mr. Gannosuke to determine who would advance past the first round of the Over the Top tournament. The match was won by Mr. Gannosuke, who forced Nakagawa to submit using his Nirvana Strangle (a full nelson camel clutch).

The eighth bout saw ECW World Heavyweight Championship Shane Douglas defend his title against Gedo. The match was won by Douglas, who pinned Gedo following a Pittsburgh Plunge.

The main event was a tag team match pitting Hayabusa and Tommy Dreamer against Rob Van Dam and Sabu. The match was won by Sabu and Van Dam, with Van Dam pinning Dreamer with a diving crossbody.

=== Results ===
No.	Results	Stipulations	Times
1	Hido defeated Takeshi Ono by pinfall	Over the Top tournament first round match	5:46
2	Masao Orihara defeated Ricky Fuji by pinfall	Over the Top tournament first round match	6:00
3	Hisakatsu Oya defeated Super Leather and Yoshinori Sasaki by submission	Three way dance	4:28
4	Kodo Fuyuki defeated Muhammad Yone by pinfall	Singles match	5:37
5	The Dudley Boyz (Buh Buh Ray Dudley and D-Von Dudley) (c) defeated Gosaku Goshogawara and Tetsuhiro Kuroda by pinfall	Tag Team match for the ECW World Tag Team Championship	14:45
6	Yukihiro Kanemura defeated Hideki Hosaka by pinfall	Over the Top tournament first round match	8:53
7	Mr. Gannosuke defeated Koji Nakagawa by submission	Over the Top tournament first round match	13:08
8	Shane Douglas (c) (with Francine) defeated Gedo by pinfall	Singles match for the ECW World Heavyweight Championship	12:25
9	Rob Van Dam and Sabu (with Bill Alfonso) defeated Hayabusa and Tommy Dreamer by pinfall	Tag team match	17:27
(c) / – the champion(s) heading into the match

== December 13, 1998 ==
=== Event ===
The second and final show of the event was held on December 13, 1998, in Korakuen Hall in Tokyo, Japan. It was attended by 2,150 people. The commentators for the pay-per-view broadcast in Japan were Go Ito, Jado, Jtarô Sugisaku, and Takashi Saito; Joey Styles provided English language commentary on the ECW Hardcore TV broadcast in post-production.

The opening bout was a singles match between Muhammad Yone and Tetsuhiro Kuroda to determine who would advance past the quarter finals of the Over the Top tournament. The match was won by Kuroda, who pinned Yone following a lariat.

The second bout was a singles match between Hido and Masao Orihara to determine who would advance past the quarter finals of the Over the Top tournament. The match was won by Hido when Orihara was disqualified.

The third bout was a singles match between Mr. Gannosuke and Yukihiro Kanemura to determine who would advance past the quarter finals of the Over the Top tournament. The match was won by Mr. Gannosuke, who pinned Kanemura following Fire Thunder.

The fourth bout was a singles match between Hayabusa and Hisakatsu Oya to determine who would advance past the quarter finals of the Over the Top tournament. The match was won by Oya, who forced Hayabusa to submit using an octopus hold.

The fifth bout was a six-man tag team match pitting Flying Kid Ichihara, Ricky Fuji, and Super Leather against Team No Respect. Team No Respect won the bout when Kodo Fuyuki pinned Ichihara following a lariat.

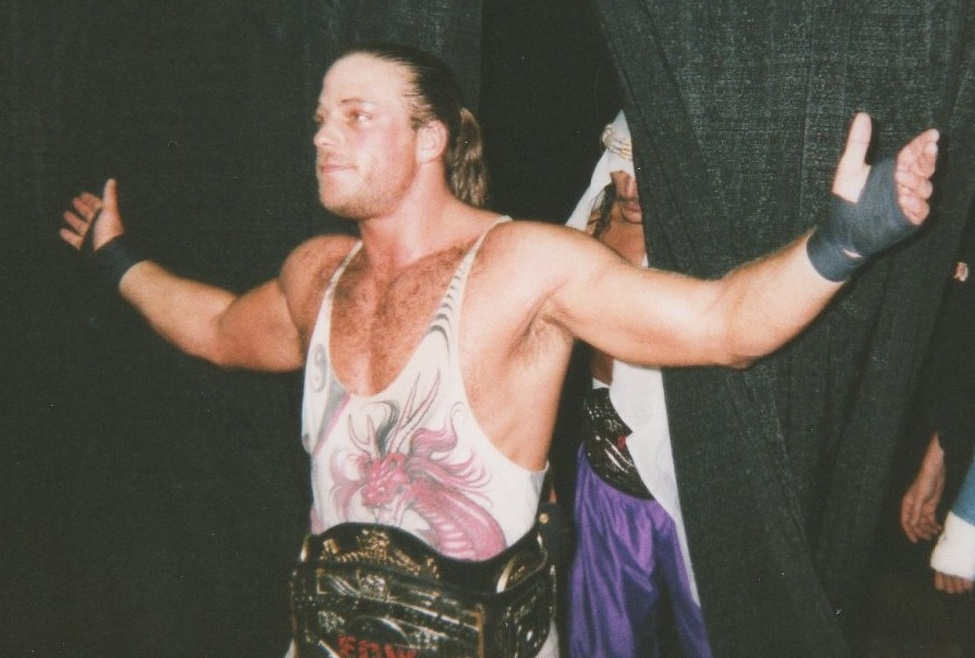
Rob Van Dam and Sabu won the ECW World Tag Team Championship at the December 13, 1998 show.

The sixth bout saw ECW World Heavyweight Champion Shane Douglas defend his title against Tommy Dreamer. Douglas defeated Dreamer by pinfall following a Pittsburgh Plunge.

The seventh bout was the main event which saw ECW World Tag Team Champions the Dudley Boyz defend their titles against Rob Van Dam and Sabu. Sabu and Van Dam defeated the Dudley Boyz by pinfall after Van Dam drove a chair into Buh Buh Ray Dudley's face with a Van Daminator, thus becoming the new ECW World Tag Team Champions.

The eighth bout (which was not included on the pay-per-view broadcast) was a singles match between Hido and Mr. Gannosuke to determine who would advance past the quarter finals of the Over the Top tournament. The match was won by Mr. Gannosuke, who forced Hido to submit using the Nirvana Strangle (a full nelson camel clutch).

The ninth bout (which was not included on the pay-per-view broadcast) was a singles match between Hisakatsu Oya and Tetsuhiro Kuroda to determine who would advance past the quarter finals of the Over the Top tournament. The match was won by Oya, who pinned Kuroda using a bridging German suplex.

=== Results ===
No.	Results	Stipulations	Times
1	Tetsuhiro Kuroda defeated Muhammad Yone by pinfall	Over the Top tournament quarter finals match	8:10
2	Hido defeated Masao Orihara via disqualification	Over the Top tournament quarter finals match	5:33
3	Mr. Gannosuke defeated Yukihiro Kanemura by pinfall	Over the Top tournament quarter finals match	10:53
4	Hisakatsu Oya defeated Hayabusa by submission	Over the Top tournament quarter finals match	13:28
5	Team No Respect (Gedo, Kodo Fuyuki, and Koji Nakagawa) defeated Flying Kid Ichihara, Ricky Fuji, and Super Leather by pinfall	Six-man tag team match	2:10
6	Shane Douglas (c) (with Francine) defeated Tommy Dreamer by pinfall	Singles match for the ECW World Heavyweight Championship	12:06
7	Rob Van Dam and Sabu (with Bill Alfonso) defeated The Dudley Boyz (Buh Buh Ray Dudley and D-Von Dudley) (c) by pinfall	Tag team match for the ECW World Tag Team Championship	17:00
8^{D}	Mr. Gannosuke defeated Hido by submission	Over the Top tournament semi-finals match	2:22
9^{D}	Hisakatsu Oya defeated Tetsuhiro Kuroda by pinfall	Over the Top tournament semi-finals match	13:42
(c) / – the champion(s) heading into the match; D / – this was a dark match

== Tournament brackets ==
Four matches of the first round and the entirety of the quarter-final and semi-final rounds of the Over the Top tournament to determine the number one contender for the FMW Brass Knuckles Heavyweight Championship and the FMW Independent Heavyweight Championship were held at the ECW/FMW Supershow.

First round
December 9, 1998
Hayabusa	Pin
Gedo	15:40
December 9, 1998
Kodo Fuyuki	Pin
Hisakatsu Oya	10:58
December 9, 1998
Muhammad Yone	Pin
Gosaku Goshogawara	9:36
December 9, 1998
Tetsuhiro Kuroda	Pin
Super Leather	14:49
December 12, 1998
Hido	Pin
Takeshi Ono	5:46
December 12, 1998
Masao Orihara	Pin
Ricky Fuji	6:00
December 12, 1998
Yukihiro Kanemura	Pin
Hideki Hosaka	8:53
December 12, 1998
Mr. Gannosuke	Pin
Koji Nakagawa	13:08

Quarter-finals
December 13, 1998
Hayabusa	Pin
Hisakatsu Oya	13:28
December 13, 1998
Muhammad Yone	Pin
Tetsuhiro Kuroda	8:10
December 13, 1998
Hido	Pin
Masao Orihara	5:33
December 13, 1998
Yukihiro Kanemura	Pin
Mr. Gannosuke	10:53

Semi-finals
December 13, 1998
Hisakatsu Oya	Pin
Tetsuhiro Kuroda	13:42
December 13, 1998
Hido	Pin
Mr. Gannosuke	2:22

Final
January 5, 1999
Hisakatsu Oya	Pin
Mr. Gannosuke	24:55
