= FMW 9th Anniversary Show =

FMW 9th Anniversary Show: Entertainment Wrestling Live
- Promotion: Frontier Martial-Arts Wrestling
- Date: April 30, 1998
- City: Yokohama, Japan
- Venue: Yokohama Cultural Gymnasium
- Attendance: 5,200

Pay-per-view chronology
← Previous; First	Next → FMW Neo 1998 Day 1

FMW Anniversary Show chronology
← Previous; 8th Anniversary	Next → 10th Anniversary

FMW 9th Anniversary Show: Entertainment Wrestling Live was the first professional wrestling pay-per-view (PPV) event produced by Frontier Martial-Arts Wrestling (FMW). The event took place on April 30, 1998, at the Yokohama Cultural Gymnasium in Yokohama, Japan. This was the first FMW event to be broadcast on pay-per-view via DirecTV. The event commemorated the ninth anniversary of FMW and was the first to be broadcast on pay-per-view.

There were two main event matches on the card. In the first main event, Mr. Gannosuke defended the FMW Double Championship (the unification of the FMW Brass Knuckles Heavyweight Championship and the FMW Independent Heavyweight Championship) against Hayabusa, who earned the title shot by winning a tournament. Hayabusa defeated Gannosuke to win the title. The second main event on the card featured Kodo Fuyuki defeating Atsushi Onita, the leader of ZEN in a match which stipulated that if Onita lost then ZEN must disband.

== Background ==
=== Production ===
FMW signed a deal with the American direct broadcast satellite provider DirecTV to begin producing monthly pay-per-view events at the time when DirecTV had just begun launching in Japan. As per deal, DirecTV would pay FMW around $600,000 annually to show FMW once a month on pay-per-view as their television outlet instead of Samurai TV. This led FMW owner Shoichi Arai to broadcast the 9th Anniversary Show on April 30, 1998, on pay-per-view and named it Entertainment Wrestling Live.

=== Storylines ===
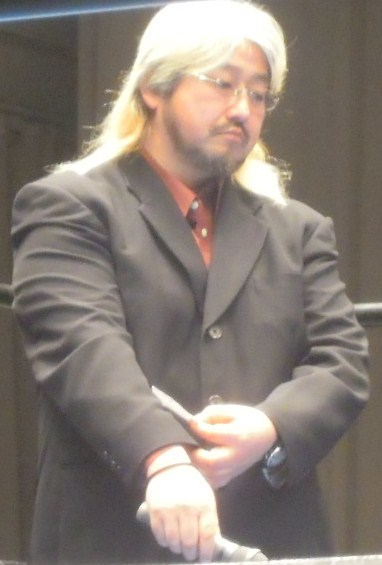
Mr. Gannosuke defended the Brass Knuckles Heavyweight Championship and the Independent Heavyweight Championship in the main event.

Hayabusa and Mr. Gannosuke had been feuding with each other since January 5, 1997, when Gannosuke returned to FMW to confront Hayabusa for not leaving FMW with him for IWA Japan. Hayabusa defeated Gannosuke in a hair vs. hair match at the 8th Anniversary Show and the two battled with each other in many matches throughout the year. On January 6, 1998, Gannosuke defeated Masato Tanaka to win the unified Brass Knuckles Heavyweight Championship and the Independent Heavyweight Championship. Following Gannosuke's title win, an eight-man single elimination tournament was set up in March to determine the #1 contender for the title at Entertainment Wrestling Live which included former champion Tanaka, Hayabusa, The Gladiator, Yukihiro Kanemura, Jado, Hisakatsu Oya, Koji Nakagawa and Tetsuhiro Kuroda. Hayabusa defeated Gladiator in the final of the tournament on March 17 to win the tournament and earn the title match with Gannosuke. On March 29, Gannosuke and Kanemura lost the Brass Knuckles Tag Team Championship to Kodo Fuyuki and Hido. On April 17, a tag team gauntlet took place to determine the #1 contenders for the Brass Knuckles Tag Team Championship, which was won by Hayabusa and Tanaka by defeating Gannosuke and Kanemura and then they subsequently defeated tag team champions Kodo Fuyuki and Hido to win the title. On April 21, Hayabusa's friend Jinsei Shinzaki announced that he would leave FMW after Entertainment Wrestling Live and he defeated Gannosuke in a non-title match to end their long running feud. On April 26, Gannosuke cost Hayabusa and Shinzaki, a tag team match against Jado and Yukihiro Kanemura by blowing fire at Hayabusa as their last confrontation before their match.

Quarterfinals
FMW TV	Hayabusa	Pin
3/13	Masato Tanaka	23:17
Live event	Tetsuhiro Kuroda	13:27
3/7	Jado	Pin
Live event	Koji Nakagawa	8:17
3/7	Yukihiro Kanemura	Pin
Live event	The Gladiator	Pin
3/8	Hisakatsu Oya	16:30

Semifinals
FMW TV	Hayabusa	Pin
3/16	Jado	17:15
FMW TV	Yukihiro Kanemura	3:12
3/16	The Gladiator	Pin

Final
FMW TV	Hayabusa	Pin
3/17	The Gladiator	14:09

Fuyuki-Gun (Fuyuki, Jado and Gedo) debuted in FMW on February 19, 1997, and he immediately began a rivalry with the former FMW owner Atsushi Onita by insulting him backstage after Onita had been assaulted by Funk Masters of Wrestling. This began a feud between Fuyuki-Gun and Onita's group ZEN. ZEN crippled by the end of the year after its key members Mr. Gannosuke, Yukihiro Kanemura and Hido turned on Onita after Onita was pinned by Hayabusa in a WarGames match on December 22. Gannosuke and his allies merged with Fuyuki-Gun to form a new group Team No Respect to feud with ZEN as all of them were jealous of Onita pushing himself as a main eventer at the expense of the entire FMW roster. On March 17, 1998, Fuyuki and Gedo defeated Koji Nakagawa and Tetsuhiro Kuroda in a tag team match, where Fuyuki mocked Onita by using Onita's "Wild Thing" theme song and Onita's finishing move Thunder Fire Powerbomb on Nakagawa, thus setting up his match with Onita at Entertainment Wrestling Live. Another added stipulation into the match due to TNR's influence was that Onita must disband ZEN if he lost the match.

== Event ==
=== Preliminary matches ===
The opening match of the event was between Hideki Hosaka and Hido. Hosaka dominated the majority of the match but Hido won the match by reversing Hosaka's attempt at a hurricanrana into a roll-up. The next match was a three-way dance between Hisakatsu Oya, Koji Nakagawa and Chris Chetti from Extreme Championship Wrestling (ECW). Oya quickly eliminated Nakagawa by making him tap out to an armbar. After a back and forth action between the two, Oya applied an octopus hold on Chetti but Chetti managed to get out of it. Oya delivered a backdrop suplex to Chetti but got a near-fall and then Oya delivered another suplex to win the match.

Jado and Gedo took on ECW's John Kronus and Ricky Fuji in a tag team match. Both teams traded momentum during the earlier part of the match until Kronus and Fuji took control of the match and delivered a Total Elimination to Jado and then Kronus proceeded to perform a 450° splash but Gedo broke the pinfall. Fuji fought Gedo and both men fell out of the ring and Kronus delivered a Chokeslam for another near-fall and then Jado kicked him in the groin and performed a Brainbuster to win the match.

The fourth match on the card was Jinsei Shinzaki's last match in the company against Team No Respect member Yukihiro Kanemura. Go Ito interfered in the match on Kanemura's behalf which allowed Kanemura to gain momentum by hitting Shinzaki with a piece of table and following it with a Baku Yama Special. Kanemura grabbed the piece to hit Shinzaki with it again but Shinzaki blocked it and hit Kanemura with it in the head repeatedly. Shinzaki delivered a Mandala Hineri and applied a Gokuraku-Gatame but Go Ito broke it. Shinzaki went after Ito and applied a Gokuraku-Gatame which was broken by Kanemura and then Shinzaki delivered a high knee and a Nenbutsu Powerbomb to Kanemura to win the match.

ECW wrestler Bam Bam Bigelow and Masato Tanaka battled back and forth in a lengthy match, where Tanaka delivered a Roaring Elbow near the end of the match but got a near-fall. He delivered a pair of enzuigiri kicks to Bigelow and climbed the top rope and dived onto his opponent but Bigelow caught him in mid-air and delivered a Greetings from Asbury Park to win the match. The Gladiator and Tetsuhiro Kuroda represented ZEN against Team No Respect members Horace Boulder and Super Leather. Boulder won the match for his team by delivering a Spinebuster to Kuroda.

The final match on the undercard pitted ZEN leader Atsushi Onita against TNR member Kodo Fuyuki. Fuyuki controlled the earlier part of the match until Onita gained momentum. Both men had back and forth action and several near-falls. Onita delivered a Thunder Fire Powerbomb near the end of the match but got a near-fall. Fuyuki hit Onita with a wooden board and delivered a lariat. Onita blocked Fuyuki's attempt at the second lariat and continued to perform moves on Onita but Onita made comeback into the match. Go Ito tried to slow down Onita's momentum by hitting him with a crutch and Fuyuki delivered a powerbomb but still got a near-fall. Fuyuki delivered a charging lariat and a powerbomb to win the match.

=== Main event match ===
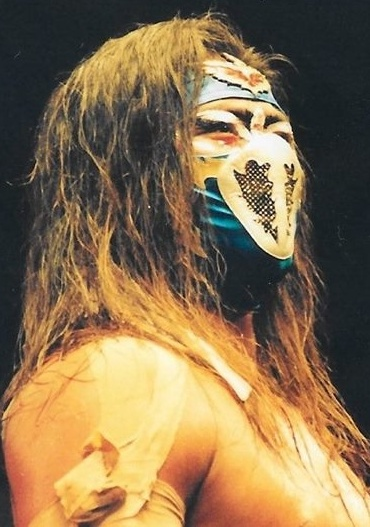
Hayabusa defeated Mr. Gannosuke in the main event to win the Brass Knuckles Heavyweight Championship and the Independent Heavyweight Championship.

In the main event, Mr. Gannosuke defended the Brass Knuckles Heavyweight Championship and the Independent Heavyweight Championship against Hayabusa. Hayabusa injured Gannosuke's knee by dropkicking him in the knee and Gannosuke worked the entire match with the injured knee. Near the end of the match, Gannosuke delivered a Fire Thunder and a Northern Light suplex but got near-falls on both attempts. He attempted to slam him down to the mat but Hayabusa countered with a dragon suplex and performed a Phoenix Splash to win the titles.

== Aftermath ==
Mr. Gannosuke was out of action for six months due to suffering the knee injury in his title loss to Hayabusa and Kodo Fuyuki took over as the leader of Team No Respect due to his win over Atsushi Onita and became the top villain and the new rival to Hayabusa. Fuyuki formed a tag team with TNR member Yukihiro Kanemura called "The New Footloose", a play on Fuyuki's old tag team Footloose. Onita continued to feud with Fuyuki as Onita, Koji Nakagawa and Tetsuhiro Kuroda lost the World Street Fight 6-Man Tag Team Championship to Hido and New Footloose at a FMW and ZEN promoted show on May 5. New Footloose won the Brass Knuckles Tag Team Championship by defeating Hayabusa and Masato Tanaka on May 27. ZEN suffered the final blow when Nakagawa turned on Onita during a title shot against New Footloose on May 31. ZEN and TNR continued to fight throughout the year and Onita was slowly being phased out of the company and quit it by the fall of the year and Hayabusa cemented his place as the permanent ace of FMW. Fuyuki continued his role as the top villain and ultimately defeated Hayabusa to capture the Double Championship on November 20.

Horace Boulder left the company after Entertainment Wrestling Live as he had already debuted for World Championship Wrestling (WCW) prior to the event and his tag team match at the pay-per-view was his last ever match for FMW. Masato Tanaka and The Gladiator left FMW and joined ECW where they continued their rivalry and competed there for the rest of the year. Gladiator would compete there under the ring name "Mike Awesome" and the two exchanged the ECW World Heavyweight Championship with each other in 1999. Tanaka would continue to work on and off with FMW while Awesome competed in his home country United States.

Mr. Gannosuke returned to FMW on November 20 and won an Over the Top Tournament between late 1998 and early 1999 to become the #1 contender for the Brass Knuckles Heavyweight Championship and the Independent Heavyweight Championship against Kodo Fuyuki. Gannosuke got his title shot on March 19, 1999, and Fuyuki retained the title.

== Results ==
No.	Results	Stipulations	Times
1	Hido defeated Hideki Hosaka	Singles match	7:32
2	Hisakatsu Oya defeated Chris Chetti and Koji Nakagawa	Three-Way Dance	9:48
3	Jado and Gedo defeated John Kronus and Ricky Fuji	Tag team match	11:52
4	Jinsei Shinzaki defeated Yukihiro Kanemura	Singles match	7:45
5	Bam Bam Bigelow defeated Masato Tanaka	Singles match	15:10
6	Horace Boulder and Super Leather defeated The Gladiator and Tetsuhiro Kuroda	Tag team match	11:01
7	Kodo Fuyuki defeated Atsushi Onita	Singles match	14:32
8	Hayabusa defeated Mr. Gannosuke (c)	Singles match for the FMW Brass Knuckles Heavyweight Championship and the FMW Independent Heavyweight Championship	21:45
(c) / – the champion(s) heading into the match

=== Three-Way Dance eliminations ===
Elimination no.	Wrestler	Eliminated by	Elimination move	Time
1	Koji Nakagawa	Hisakatsu Oya	Armbar	6:35
2	Chris Chetti	Hisakatsu Oya	Backdrop Suplex	9:48
Winner:	Hisakatsu Oya			

== See also ==
- Frontier Martial-Arts Wrestling events
