= ZEN (professional wrestling) =

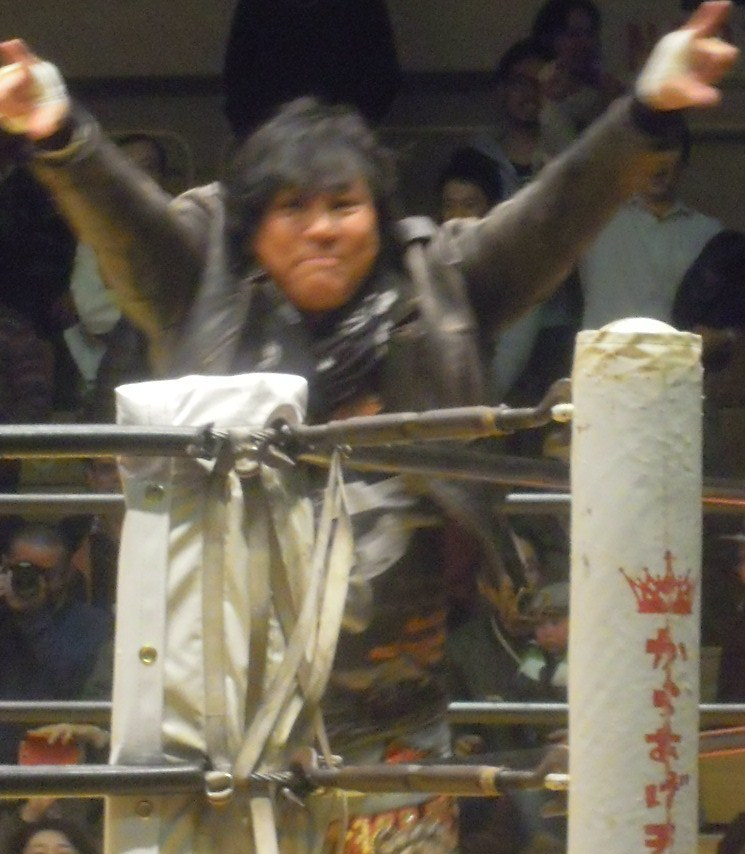
- The group leader and founder Atsushi Onita

Stable
- Members: See below
- Name(s): ZEN
- Debut: September 30, 1997
- Disbanded: May 5, 1998

ZEN was a professional wrestling stable in Frontier Martial-Arts Wrestling (FMW). The group was led by former FMW owner and the company's founder Atsushi Onita from late 1997 to mid 1998 and the group was based on World Championship Wrestling's New World Order (nWo). The group produced its own shows in collaboration with FMW like nWo promoted its own pay-per-view nWo Souled Out.

Upon its formation, the group immediately wiped out W*ING Alliance and Funk Masters of Wrestling that had been dominating FMW for the past few years and was the lead villainous group formed by the unofficial merger of both factions. Their dominance ended when Mr. Gannosuke, Yukihiro Kanemura and Hido turned on Onita after Onita lost a WarGames match to Hayabusa. The trio formed Team No Respect and ZEN turned fan favorites and feuded with TNR. The group was forced to disband after Onita lost to Kodo Fuyuki and the group disbanded on May 5, 1998.

== History ==
=== Feud with FMW ===
Atsushi Onita had been feuding with W*ING Alliance since 1994 and the group was formed with the concept of ending FMW because the group held Onita and his FMW responsible for ending W*ING. Onita concluded his rivalry with W*ING at Kawasaki Legend on September 28, 1997 by defeating W*ING Kanemura and the match stipulated that W*ING group would be forced to disband if Kanemura lost to Onita. As a result, the W*ING group disbanded. After the match, W*ING members Kanemura, Hideki Hosaka and Hido were worried because FMW or any other group would not accept them and Onita became concerned about them and then quit FMW in anger and took them under his wing. On September 30, Onita announced the formation of his new group ZEN with W*ING Alliance members and FMW's Tetsuhiro Kuroda defected to the group as well. The group was irate at Hayabusa, Masato Tanaka and Koji Nakagawa's leadership of FMW and replaced Funk Masters of Wrestling as the new lead villainous group of FMW and marked the first time that Onita became a villain in FMW.

The group based itself after nWo by sporting black and white colors and rebelled against Shoichi Arai's FMW. On October 14, ZEN competed in its first match in which Onita, Hido and Kuroda defeated FMW's Hayabusa, Nakagawa and Tanaka to win the World Street Fight 6-Man Tag Team Championship. ZEN also won the Brass Knuckles Tag Team Championship from Funk Masters of Wrestling's Mr. Gannosuke and Hisakatsu Oya on October 19, which led Gannosuke and Oya to join ZEN. On October 21, Gannosuke and Oya defeated Funk Masters of Wrestling's remaining members The Gladiator and Super Leather after Gladiator turned on Leather and disbanded Funk Masters of Wrestling for good. Later in the night, ZEN members Kanemura, Hosaka, Hido and Kuroda defeated FMW's team of Hayabusa, Masato Tanaka, Koji Nakagawa and Jinsei Shinzaki in an eight-man tag team match when Kuroda pinned Tanaka for the first time in his career. After the match, ZEN attacked their opponents until Gladiator showed up and delivered an Awesome Bomb to Hayabusa and joined ZEN by waving its flag in the group.

In November 1997, Onita and Kanemura were forced to vacate the Brass Knuckles Tag Team Championship due to inactivity and Kanemura and Gannosuke brought the title back to ZEN by defeating Hayabusa and Masato Tanaka for the vacant title on November 28. Friction arose within ZEN after Hisakatsu Oya and Hideki Hosaka began screaming at one another. Oya quit ZEN after losing to Hayabusa on December 5 and Oya turned fan favorite by quitting ZEN and joining FMW, thus becoming the first person to quit ZEN. Also on the show, Tetsuhiro Kuroda earned a title shot at Masato Tanaka's Brass Knuckles Heavyweight Championship and Independent Heavyweight Championship for pinning Tatanka on October 21 and Tanaka retained his Double Championship.

=== Feud with Team No Respect ===
More friction arose in ZEN following Hisakatsu Oya's exit as Gannosuke and Kanemura became upset at Atsushi Onita for booking his non-title match with the Double Champion Masato Tanaka to be the main event instead of Gannosuke and Kanemura's Brass Knuckles Tag Team Championship defense against Hayabusa and Jinsei Shinzaki on the December 19 show in the Super Extreme Wrestling War tour. ZEN competed in three matches at the event with Hideki Hosaka, Hido and Tetsuhiro Kuroda losing to Fuyuki-Gun in the opening match of the event while Gannosuke and Kanemura retained the title against Hayabusa and Shinzaki and Onita pinned Tanaka in the main event. Gannosuke, Kanemura and Hido began separating themselves from Onita due to his selfishness and ego. The following night, on December 20, Onita, Hido and Kuroda lost the World Street Fight 6-Man Tag Team Championship to Hayabusa, Masato Tanaka and former ZEN member Hisakatsu Oya. On December 21, Onita, Hido, Hosaka (as The Great Fake), Kuroda and Gladiator lost to the ECW team of Terry Funk, The Sandman, Tommy Dreamer and Dudley Boyz. On December 22, a turning point took place in the history of ZEN when Onita, Gannosuke and Kanemura lost to Hayabusa, Masato Tanaka and Jinsei Shinzaki in a Barbed Wire Baseball Bat Ladder WarGames match when Hayabusa pinned Onita following a Moonsault from the top of the cage, which he had failed to do at the 6th Anniversary Show. After the match, Gannosuke, Kanemura and Hido attacked Onita out of jealousy until a mysterious man in a black jacket attacked them with a steel chair forcing them to retreat and leave ZEN. The man was revealed to be Koji Nakagawa, who had left FMW a week ago due to being upset with his position in the company and joined ZEN as the group's newest member.

As a result of it, ZEN turned fan favorites and feuded with the new group of their former members Gannosuke, Kanemura and Hido and the group became a four-man group with Onita, Nakagawa, Kuroda and Hosaka. On January 7, 1998, ZEN promoted its first show in the nWo Souled Out-themed format, in which Onita, Nakagawa and Kuroda defeated Gannosuke, Kanemura and Hido. Fuyuki-Gun attacked ZEN after the match due to Kodo Fuyuki's hatred for Onita and then formed a team with Gannosuke, Kanemura and Hido called Team No Respect. ZEN switched its battle from FMW to TNR. On February 13, Onita, Nakagawa and Kuroda defeated Gannosuke, Kanemura and Jado to win the World Street Fight 6-Man Tag Team Championship at ZEN's second promoted show. After the match, TNR attacked the match referee Go Ito, forcing him to walk on crutches. This turned out to be a ruse as Ito turned on ZEN by attacking Nakagawa with his crutch in the back to cost Nakagawa and Kuroda, a Brass Knuckles Tag Team Championship opportunity against Gannosuke and Kanemura on February 19.

ZEN promoted its third show on March 13, on which they lost to TNR's Mr. Gannosuke, Horace Boulder, Hido and Yukihiro Kanemura. ZEN's fourth show took place on April 6, where ZEN lost to Gannosuke, Fuyuki, Hido and Kanemura in the main event.

=== Dissolution ===
A legitimate feud evolved between Onita and Fuyuki over backstage control on FMW as Onita wanted to continue the deathmatch style of FMW, which had brought success to the company while Fuyuki was trying to influence backstage by putting his emphasis on converting the FMW style into sports entertainment style based on American wrestling but it would be a disappointment for FMW because FMW had gained fame due to the deathmatch style. Fuyuki would win the support of the majority of FMW staff because most of the staff had been jealous towards Onita due to his notoriety as an egomaniac.

The dominance of ZEN rapidly declined and TNR began growing in power. Onita's off-screen feud with Fuyuki developed into a match between the two at FMW's first pay-per-view Entertainment Wrestling Live, where Onita lost to Fuyuki, which stipulated that ZEN must disband if Onita lost to Fuyuki. ZEN lost the rest of its matches on the show as well; Hideki Hosaka lost to Hido, Koji Nakagawa lost a three-way dance to Hisakatsu Oya and The Gladiator and Tetsuhiro Kuroda lost to Horace Boulder and Super Leather. However, Onita, who was notorious for being "Mr. Liar" did not end ZEN as a show was already planned for ZEN on May 5 and he said that ZEN would disband if they lost to TNR on the show. Onita, Nakagawa and Kuroda lost the World Street Fight 6-Man Tag Team Championship to Kodo Fuyuki, Yukihiro Kanemura and Hido, forcing ZEN to disband and FMW owner Shoichi Arai was forced to lick Go Ito's boots as a result of pre-match stipulation.

=== Post-dissolution ===
ZEN name officially ended but the group remained united even after its demise and continued their feud with Team No Respect as Onita wanted his revenge on Fuyuki for ending the group. On May 25, the former ZEN members lost to TNR's Hido, Jado, Kodo Fuyuki and Yukihiro Kanemura in a match stipulated that TNR would get to pick a member of Onita's alliance and they forced Hideki Hosaka to become their slave. The following night, on May 26, Hido, Fuyuki and Kanemura defeated Onita, Koji Nakagawa and Tetsuhiro Kuroda with the same stipulation and picked Kuroda as their slave, which led to Onita and Nakagawa as the only remaining members of the alliance. On May 31, Onita and Nakagawa received a shot at Fuyuki and Kanemura's Brass Knuckles Tag Team Championship, during which Nakagawa turned on Onita by hitting him with Go Ito's crutch and was revealed as TNR's planted mole in ZEN to destroy ZEN.

== Team Zero ==
Team Zero

Stable
- Members: Atsushi Onita; Tetsuhiro Kuroda; Hideki Hosaka; Mr. Pogo #2/Gosaku Goshogawara; Yoshinori Sasaki
- Name(s): Team Zero
- Debut: August 21, 1998
- Disbanded: December 11, 1998

Team Zero was a short-lived spin-off of Atsushi Onita's ZEN, which was formed on August 21, 1998. Onita went on a leave of absence after the dissolution of ZEN because he felt that he was not being booked properly and he was enraged at putting over Kodo Fuyuki. After working a storyline in ECW, Onita returned to FMW on July 20 after Team No Respect attacked FMW President Shoichi Arai and Onita made the save for Arai with preliminary wrestlers Yoshinori Sasaki and FMW's veteran enhancement talent Gosaku Goshogawara as Mr. Pogo #2 (Goshogawara had been given the character by the original Mr. Pogo after Pogo retired from FMW in 1996). At Atsushi Onita Presents Liar, Liar, Onita, Arai, Pogo and Sasaki defeated Go Ito and Team No Respect members Kodo Fuyuki, Koji Nakagawa and Yukihiro Kanemura in a weapons deathmatch to release Onita's former ZEN teammates Tetsuhiro Kuroda and Hideki Hosaka from TNR's slavery and retain Arai's post as FMW President.

On August 21, Onita formed Team Zero with Tetsuhiro Kuroda, Hideki Hosaka, Mr. Pogo and Yoshinori Sasaki due to Onita's grudge with Fuyuki and his desire to fulfill the revenge. Team Zero's first match was a loss to TNR. The group began wearing kilts. On September 1, Team Zero defeated TNR in a match where they put their kilts on the line against TNR's briefs. Onita gained his revenge on Fuyuki by pinning him to win the match and TNR were no longer allowed to wear briefs due to the pre-match stipulation and Team Zero crucified their briefs after the match. TNR retaliated by stealing Team Zero's kilts.

On September 3, the original Mr. Pogo returned to FMW under the name "The Great Pogo" and cost Team Zero, a barbed wire street fight against TNR by attacking Onita and Mr. Pogo #2 in the parking lot. Team Zero defeated TNR in a street fight on September 4. On September 29, Great Pogo defeated Mr. Pogo #2 to begin re-using Mr. Pogo while Mr. Pogo #2 reverted to using his real name Gosaku Goshogawara. Onita and Pogo restarted their historic rivalry and they concluded their feud in FMW on November 20, where Onita defeated Pogo in his farewell match to leave FMW. Onita had quit FMW because he was irate at being demoted from the company's ace to wrestle mid-card matches and FMW was not being a success without him, which led to his departure. On December 11, Onita and Yoshinori Sasaki defeated Team Zero teammates Tetsuhiro Kuroda and Hideki Hosaka in a street fight to officially end Team Zero.

== Members ==
- Atsushi Onita (September 30, 1997–May 5, 1998)
- Yukihiro Kanemura (September 30, 1997–December 22, 1997)
- Hido (September 30, 1997–December 22, 1997)
- Hideki Hosaka (September 30, 1997–May 5, 1998)
- Tetsuhiro Kuroda (September 30, 1997–May 5, 1998)
- Hisakatsu Oya (October 19, 1997–December 5, 1997)
- Mr. Gannosuke (October 19, 1997–December 22, 1997)
- The Gladiator (October 21, 1997–May 5, 1998)
- Koji Nakagawa (December 22, 1997–May 5, 1998)

== Championships and accomplishments ==
- Frontier Martial-Arts Wrestling
  - FMW Brass Knuckles Tag Team Championship (2 times) - Atsushi Onita and Koji Nakagawa (1), Mr. Gannosuke and Yukihiro Kanemura (1)
  - FMW World Street Fight 6-Man Tag Team Championship (2 times) - Atsushi Onita, Tetsuhiro Kuroda and Hido (1), Atsushi Onita, Koji Nakagawa and Tetsuhiro Kuroda (1)
