= Team No Respect =

Stable
- Members: See list
- Name(s): Team No Respect (TNR); Brief Brothers
- Debut: January 7, 1998
- Disbanded: June 16, 2000 (FMW); 2003 (WEW)

Team No Respect was a professional wrestling faction in Frontier Martial-Arts Wrestling (FMW), which existed in the company between 1998 and 2000. The ideology of the group was that they disrespected all the wrestlers in FMW as well as the company's management and President Shoichi Arai. TNR was formed after Mr. Gannosuke, Yukihiro Kanemura and Hido turned on their ZEN leader Atsushi Onita out of jealousy with Onita due to his high ego and selfishness and formed a major alliance with Fuyuki-Gun. TNR was the most popular, successful and influential stable in the history of FMW and were involved in FMW's major storylines and rivalries during its two and a half year existence.

== History ==
=== Frontier Martial-Arts Wrestling ===
==== Mr. Gannosuke's leadership (1998) ====
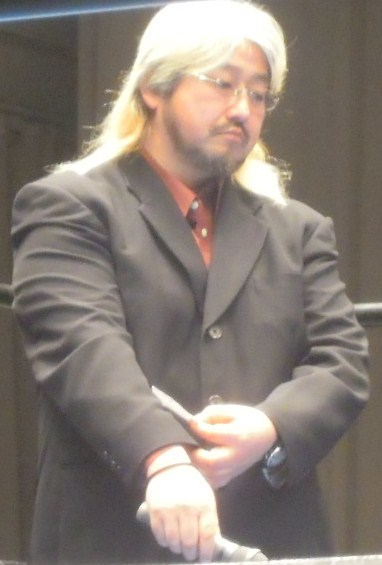
Mr. Gannosuke was the original leader of Team No Respect and the top villain of FMW in early 1998.

Atsushi Onita had formed ZEN in late 1997, which quickly removed W*ING and Funk Masters of Wrestling from FMW and absorbed the members of the groups into ZEN. Jealousy arose within the group on December 19, 1997, during the first show of the Super Extreme Wrestling War when Onita booked himself in the main event, which angered Mr. Gannosuke and Yukihiro Kanemura, who thought that their FMW Brass Knuckles Tag Team Championship match deserved to be the main event of the show. They were irate of Onita's egoism and selfishness. On December 22, Onita, Gannosuke and Kanemura lost a WarGames match to Masato Tanaka, Hayabusa and Jinsei Shinzaki after Hayabusa pinned Onita. Gannosuke and Kanemura attacked Onita after the match and left ZEN, along with Hido. On January 7, 1998, Onita, Koji Nakagawa and Tetsuhiro Kuroda defeated the trio of Gannosuke, Kanemura and Hido at ZEN's first show. Kodo Fuyuki and Jado attacked ZEN after the match and joined Gannosuke and Kanemura in a meeting in their locker rooms, where Kanemura named the merger "Team No Respect". Gannosuke became the leader of the group as he was the company's top villain and the reigning Brass Knuckles Heavyweight Champion and Independent Heavyweight Champion.

TNR primarily feuded with ZEN and FMW's team and TNR also got the Brass Knuckles Tag Team Championship held by Gannosuke and Kanemura. TNR's first match together took place on January 9, in which Gannosuke, Kanemura and Jado defeated Hayabusa, Jinsei Shinzaki and Ricky Fuji. On January 16, the trio defeated Hayabusa, Hisakatsu Oya and Masato Tanaka to capture the World Street Fight 6-Man Tag Team Championship, the first title that was won by TNR. As a result, Gannosuke held all major FMW's men's titles. TNR soon gained more members as Fuyuki-Gun member Gedo returned to FMW and Super Leather joined the group and TNR's ally Hido also became an official member. On February 13, Gannosuke, Kanemura and Jado lost the World Street Fight 6-Man Tag Team Championship to ZEN's Atsushi Onita, Koji Nakagawa and Tetsuhiro Kuroda. After the match, TNR attacked the match referee Go Ito, forcing him to walk on crutches. This turned out to be a ruse as Ito joined TNR by attacking Nakagawa with his crutch in the back to cost Nakagawa and Kuroda, a Brass Knuckles Tag Team Championship opportunity against Gannosuke and Kanemura on February 19. Later in the main event, TNR achieved more success as Fuyuki defeated the company's ace Hayabusa in the first-time ever match between the two.

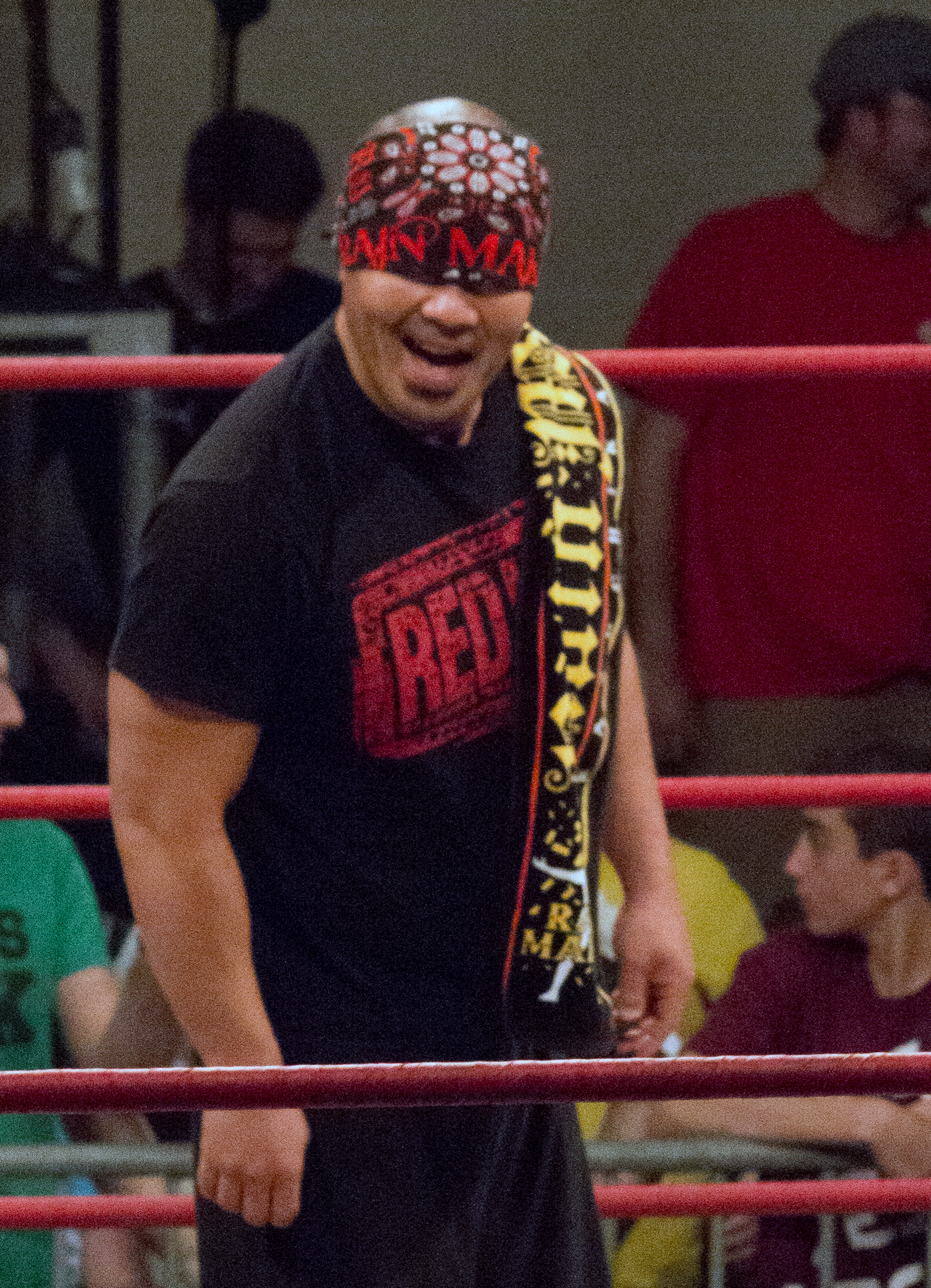
Gedo was one of the founding members of TNR who remained with the group throughout its existence.

Gannosuke demanded that Shoichi Arai set up a tournament to determine the #1 contender for his Double Championship. Kanemura and Jado were entered into the tournament and both men won their quarter-final matches against Koji Nakagawa and Tetsuhiro Kuroda on March 7 respectively, but lost to The Gladiator and Hayabusa in their respective semi-final matches. Hayabusa won the tournament to become the #1 contender to Gannosuke's title. On March 13, Horace Boulder was brought in as TNR's newest member alongside Hido, Gannosuke and Kanemura during a street fight against ZEN, which TNR won. TNR and ZEN's feud would also develop a singles rivalry between Kodo Fuyuki and ZEN leader Atsushi Onita, stemming from the legitimate backstage conflict between the two on the control over FMW. Onita wanted to maintain the deathmatch style in FMW which made the company successful while Fuyuki wanted to transform it into sports entertainment and had won the support of the majority of FMW's locker room, who were upset at Onita due to his egoism and selfishness.

In early 1998, TNR introduced a new gimmick for TNR called "Brief Brothers" in which they would undress to reveal their briefs and held many hilarious pranks which would help TNR get over with the fans. During one skit, they pulled a rag on their member Hido and had Jado portray Hido's wife Megumi Kudo as "Megumi Jado" and they conducted a "wedding" between Hido and Megumi Jado. On March 17, TNR mocked the fans into believing that Hayabusa had joined the group by having Hayabusa appear to join them and then he unmasked himself to reveal Yukihiro Kanemura in a Hayabusa outfit and then he removed the "Hayabusa" attire to reveal his briefs. Kodo Fuyuki and Hido defeated Mr. Gannosuke and Yukihiro Kanemura to win the Brass Knuckles Tag Team Championship on March 29. They lost the title to Hayabusa and Masato Tanaka on April 17.

TNR competed in five matches at FMW's first pay-per-view 9th Anniversary Show. Hido won the first match against ZEN's Hideki Hosaka. Jado and Gedo defeated Ricky Fuji and John Kronus in a tag team match and Yukihiro Kanemura lost to the departing Jinsei Shinzaki in Shinzaki's last FMW match and the team of Horace Boulder and Super Leather defeated ZEN's Tetsuhiro Kuroda and The Gladiator. Kodo Fuyuki defeated Atsushi Onita in a match where Onita put ZEN's existence on the line, forcing ZEN to disband while Mr. Gannosuke lost the Double Championship to Hayabusa. Gannosuke injured his knee during the match and he was out of action for six months.

==== Kodo Fuyuki's leadership (1998) ====
Following Mr. Gannosuke's injury, Kodo Fuyuki took over as the leader of TNR. On May 5, Onita agreed to end ZEN if Fuyuki, Yukihiro Kanemura and Hido were able to beat him, Koji Nakagawa and Tetsuhiro Kuroda in a street fight for the World Street Fight 6-Man Tag Team Championship. TNR won the title, forcing ZEN to disband. On May 19, Fuyuki and Kanemura formed a tag team called The New Footloose, a spin-off of Fuyuki's old tag team with Toshiaki Kawada called Footloose. Fuyuki began getting influential in FMW by getting the right to book his own matches and he made a match between TNR and ZEN on May 25, with the stipulation that if ZEN lost then TNR would pick a member of ZEN. ZEN lost and TNR picked Hideki Hosaka as their slave. The same stipulation was for the next night and TNR won again with Tetsuhiro Kuroda being forced to become TNR's slave. On May 27, New Footloose defeated Hayabusa and Masato Tanaka to win the Brass Knuckles Tag Team Championship. On May 31, New Footloose defended the title against Atsushi Onita and Koji Nakagawa, during which Nakagawa turned on Onita by hitting him with a crutch to end Onita's alliance and joined TNR. TNR misused Hosaka and Kuroda and Nakagawa would often beat and attack his former ZEN teammates to prove his loyalty to TNR. On June 1, TNR vacated the World Street Fight 6-Man Tag Team Championship and regained it later in the night as Fuyuki, Kanemura and Nakagawa defeated Hayabusa, Masato Tanaka and Hisakatsu Oya to win the title.

On June 19, Super Leather took on Hido in a loser leaves TNR match due to his recent losing streak and TNR helped Hido in beating Leather and then Go Ito publicly fired Leather from the group. Later at the event, TNR lost to FMW's Hayabusa, Hisakatsu Oya, Ricky Fuji and Daisuke Ikeda. TNR would then split into two rivalries and that were against FMW and the returning Atsushi Onita. On July 10, Nakagawa pinned Hayabusa in an elimination tag team match and Hayabusa wanted retribution by demanding a match with Hayabusa. On July 20, New Footloose defeated Yoshinori Sasaki and Mr. Pogo #2 and then attacked Shoichi Arai until Onita made the save and Go Ito suggested that he, Fuyuki, Nakagawa and Kanemura face Onita, Pogo #2, Sasaki and Arai in a match which stipulated that if TNR won, Arai would lose his presidency and if Onita's team won, then Tetsuhiro Kuroda and Hideki Hosaka would be freed from TNR's slavery. Onita's team defeated TNR in a weapons deathmatch to release Kuroda and Hosaka from TNR's slavery at Atsushi Onita Presents Liar, Liar.

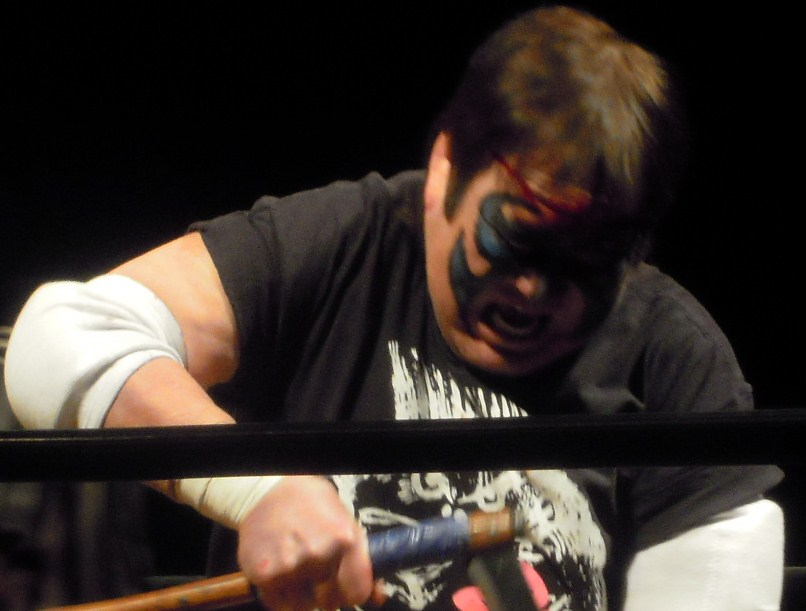
Mr. Pogo was affiliated with TNR during his brief return to FMW in 1998 as both shared a common enemy in Atsushi Onita.

On August 21, Onita formed Team Zero and took on TNR in a street fight, which TNR won. Go Ito kidnapped Shoichi Arai's niece Kaoruko Arai and began brainwashing her to make her fall in love with him. At Welcome to the Darkside, Nakagawa defeated Darkside of Hayabusa with the help of Mr. Gannosuke, who appeared in a disguise as Jinsei Shinzaki. Team Zero defeated TNR in a street fight on September 1 and then crucified TNR's briefs to end the "Brief Brothers" gimmick. The original Mr. Pogo returned to FMW as "The Great Pogo" and attacked Onita and Pogo #2 in the parking lot, which led to the renewal of a feud between Onita and Great Pogo, allowing TNR to completely focus on feuding with Hayabusa and FMW. During this time, Masao Orihara and Takeshi Ono joined TNR. Nakagawa headlined the October 6 pay-per-view against Hayabusa for his Double Championship, where Hayabusa retained the title. The show also featured Daisuke Ikeda and Ricky Fuji defeat Gedo and Hido with the help of Kaori Nakayama, who prevented Go Ito from interfering. TNR defeated Hayabusa and Ricky Fuji in a handicap match when Fuyuki pinned Hayabusa to become the #1 contender for the Double Championship. On October 26, New Footloose lost the Brass Knuckles Tag Team Championship to Hayabusa and Daisuke Ikeda.

TNR was successful on November 20 as Mr. Gannosuke returned to FMW under the guise of Jinsei Shinzaki at the event and defeated Tetsuhiro Kuroda. Yukihiro Kanemura asked him about his antics but Gannosuke refused to answer and walked out on TNR. Go Ito and Hido defeated Kaori Nakayama and Ricky Fuji in an intergender tag team match. Later at the event, Kodo Fuyuki defeated Hayabusa to win the Double Championship. Shoichi Arai stripped TNR off the World Street Fight 6-Man Tag Team Championship and awarded it to the departing Atsushi Onita as a tribute for setting up the company and making it very successful. An Over the Top Tournament was set up during which problems arose between the team of Ono and Orihara and the rest of TNR beginning with Hido beating Ono in the opening round at ECW/FMW Supershow I. Orihara low blowed Hido during the quarter-final match at ECW/FMW Supershow II. Fuyuki also participated in the tournament but lost to Hisakatsu Oya in the opening round. On December 17, TNR let Orihara and Ono out of the group when Gedo caused them to get eliminated during a Come Out and Play match, which TNR eventually lost.

==== Face run (1999) ====
Orihara and Ono gained their revenge on TNR by defeating Gedo and Hido on January 5, 1999. Later at the event, Kodo Fuyuki defeated Yukihiro Kanemura in a non-title match and then Fuyuki announced that TNR would no longer be looking for control over FMW. On January 6, Fuyuki retained the Double Championship against Hisakatsu Oya and then TNR officially turned fan favorites by quitting their villainous tactics. Jado and Go Ito disagreed with Fuyuki and quit TNR. TNR began feuding with Gannosuke's Outlaws and Fuyuki rescued Hayabusa from an assault on February 21 to end his feud with Hayabusa and form an alliance. TNR also began feuding with Battlarts group. During this time, TNR formed an alliance with Hayabusa's Team Phoenix to feud with Gannosuke's Outlaws and Battlarts. Hayabusa and Fuyuki participated in a tournament for the vacant Brass Knuckles Tag Team Championship, which they ended up losing to Masato Tanaka and Tetsuhiro Kuroda in the final on May 3, 1999.

TNR formed an alliance with Gannosuke's Outlaws to feud with Battlarts. Former tag team partners Jado and Gedo also began feuding as Jado was irate at Gedo for sticking with TNR and the two had a match on May 5, which Gedo won. Later at the event, Battlarts defeated TNR and Gannosuke's Outlaws in an elimination match. In the main event, Fuyuki retained the Double Championship against Tetsuhiro Kuroda and TNR reunited as Gannosuke and Jado rejoined the group and they did their signature TNR Dance to their theme song "Come Out and Play". TNR turned villains again and Fuyuki revealed that he had become the new FMW Commissioner and they reverted to feuding with Hayabusa and FMW.

==== The reunion of TNR (1999) ====
Following TNR's reunion, Kodo Fuyuki brought in porn star Sena Wakana as his valet and awarded his Independent Heavyweight Championship to Mr. Gannosuke and Brass Knuckles Heavyweight Championship to Yukihiro Kanemura. On May 31, FMW President Shoichi Arai joined TNR who had been brainwashed by Fuyuki into making him the Commissioner of the company. Later at the show, the FMW team of Masato Tanaka, Hayabusa, Hideki Hosaka, Hisakatsu Oya and Tetsuhiro Kuroda defeated TNR in an elimination tag team match. On June 13, Koji Nakagawa and Gedo defeated Tanaka and Kuroda to win the Brass Knuckles Tag Team Championship. On June 15, Sena Wakana walked out on Fuyuki and TNR by leaving with Flying Kid Ichihara, who had been beaten by Jado. Hayabusa, Tanaka and Kuroda defeated the original TNR members Mr. Gannosuke, Yukihiro Kanemura and Hido in a ladder match where Fuyuki would be forced to eat dog food if TNR lost. Fuyuki chewed a bit of it and then spit it on Hayabusa's face and a brawl took place between TNR and FMW.

Fuyuki instituted a governing body for FMW called World Entertainment Wrestling (WEW) and renamed Nakagawa and Gedo's FMW Brass Knuckles Tag Team Championship to WEW World Tag Team Championship. He slowly abandoned FMW titles and replaced them with WEW titles. He created a new WEW 6-Man Tag Team Championship and a tournament was set up for the title which Fuyuki, Nakagawa and Gedo won on July 31 by defeating Hayabusa, Masato Tanaka and Tetsuhiro Kuroda on July 31. Fuyuki also forced Hayabusa to end the Hayabusa character and compete under his real name Eiji Ezaki after August 25. At Goodbye Hayabusa II: Haunted House, Jado defeated Flying Kid Ichihara in a match which stipulated that Sena Wakana must remove her clothes if Ichihara lost and Wakana undressed to reveal her undergarments. Gedo helped Shoichi Arai defeat Ricky Fuji in a match on August 20, with Fuyuki as the special guest referee. Later at the event, Mr. Gannosuke lost the Independent Heavyweight Championship to Masato Tanaka. At Goodbye Hayabusa II: Hayabusa Graduation Ceremony, Mr. Gannosuke and Jado defeated Flying Kid Ichihara and Naohiko Yamazaki and Sena Wakana was forced to remove her bra and panties due to the pre-match stipulation, which she did to reveal another pair of bra and panties. Masato Tanaka and Ricky Fuji defeated Kodo Fuyuki and Shoichi Arai while Koji Nakagawa and Gedo lost the WEW Tag Team Championship to Tetsuhiro Kuroda and Hisakatsu Oya. Yukihiro Kanemura lost to the Brass Knuckles Heavyweight Championship to Hayabusa. Following the match, Fuyuki offered flowers and handshake to Hayabusa which the latter shook.

At Goodbye Hayabusa II: Last Match, Jado defeated Flying Kid Ichihara once again with the stipulation that Sena Wakana had to strip her bra and panties and as she began to do it, Jado stopped it by saying that he did not want to see her naked anyway. The event also saw TNR retain the 6-Man Tag Team Championship while Yukihiro Kanemura failed to win the Independent Heavyweight Championship from Masato Tanaka and Mr. Gannosuke unsuccessfully challenged Hayabusa for the Brass Knuckles Heavyweight Championship in Eiji Ezaki's last match as Hayabusa. After the match, Fuyuki came out to present Hayabusa with the flowers once again and then TNR attacked him and tore his mask and clothes. Shoichi Arai pleaded TNR to stop doing so but he was attacked as well, thus leaving TNR. Hayabusa would then go by the ring name "H". On August 27, H eliminated all the members of TNR in an elimination match and re-injured Gannosuke's knee by dropkicking him in the same knee which H had injured a year ago. On September 3, Gannosuke attacked H under a Hayabusa disguise and said that he would compete as Hayabusa from then onwards.

On September 23, TNR lost the World Street Fight 6-Man Tag Team Championship to Masato Tanaka, Tetsuhiro Kuroda and Hisakatsu Oya. A day later, Fuyuki replaced the Independent Heavyweight Championship and the Brass Knuckles Heavyweight Championship with the WEW Single Championship and created a new WEW Hardcore Championship and awarded it to Yukihiro Kanemura, who changed his name to "Kintaro Kanemura". TNR brought a bag and revealed Shoichi Arai's body in the bag and then the group circled around it and urinated on it. TNR's Hayabusa began feuding with H while Fuyuki picked up a rivalry with Tanaka. Shoichi Arai helped Tanaka beat Fuyuki, Kanemura and Jado in a handicap match. TNR and their mystery partner Chocoball Mukai lost to H, Tetsuhiro Kuroda, Flying Kid Ichihara and Yoshinori Sasaki in the main event. H and Hayabusa competed in an anus explosion match on October 29, during which Hayabusa tied H in the corner and pulled down his shorts to place a firecracker in his G-string, which exploded.

At 10th Anniversary Show, Koji Nakagawa, Gedo and Jado lost to Ricky Fuji, Flying Kid Ichihara and Chocoball Mukai in a ladder match for the vacant 6-Man Tag Team Championship. Later in the show, Hido lost a mixed martial arts match to Willie Williams. Kanemura retained the Hardcore Championship against ECW's Balls Mahoney. Fuyuki lost the WEW World Heavyweight Championship to Masato Tanaka in a loser leaves FMW 13,000 volt electrical thunderbolt cage deathmatch, forcing Fuyuki to leave FMW. H defeated Hayabusa in the main event, with Shawn Michaels as the special guest referee. H and Gannosuke reconciled after the match and formed a tag team, which led to Gannosuke turning fan favorite and leaving TNR.

==== Dissolution (1999–2000) ====
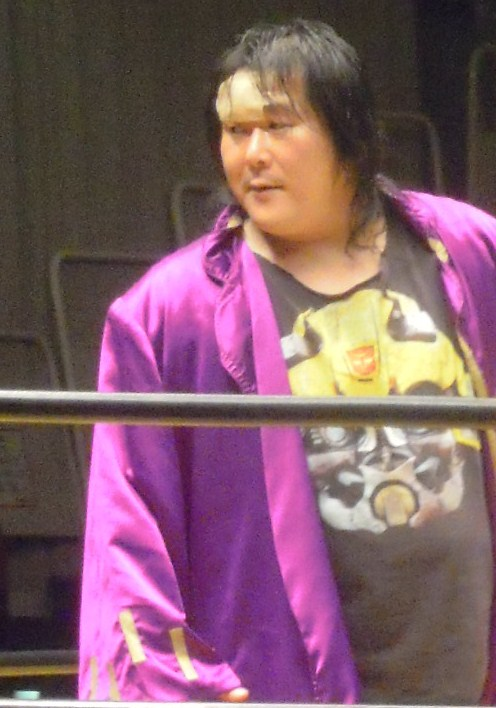
Kintaro Kanemura led the group after Kodo Fuyuki was forced to leave FMW in storyline.

Following the departure of Kodo Fuyuki and Mr. Gannosuke from the group, TNR began to lose influence and main event status in FMW and were relegated to mid-card status and Kintaro Kanemura took over as the leader of the group. On December 11, Koji Nakagawa, Jado and Gedo defeated Ricky Fuji, Chocoball Mukai and Flying Kid Ichihara to win the 6-Man Tag Team Championship and Kintaro Kanemura successfully defended the WEW Hardcore Championship against ECW's Axl Rotten. On December 12, Hido left TNR and changed his ring name to "Willie Takayama" in honor of Willie Williams, to whom he had lost at 10th Anniversary Show. TNR defeated ECW's Yoshihiro Tajiri, Super Crazy and Hardcore Chair Swingin' Freaks (Balls Mahoney and Axl Rotten) in a TNR vs. ECW match. Kanemura lost the Hardcore Championship to Ryuji Yamakawa at a Big Japan Pro Wrestling (BJW) event on February 22. On February 25, TNR was split into two teams: Kanemura and Jado and Nakagawa and Gedo in a four corners match. Nakagawa and Gedo won the match by last eliminating Kanemura and Jado to become the #1 contenders for the Tag Team Championship, which they would win by defeating former TNR member Kodo Fuyuki and Kyoko Inoue on April 1. On March 2, Kanemura, Jado and Gedo represented FMW against BJW's Ryuji Yamazaki, Great Kojika and The Winger at a BJW event, with TNR winning the match for FMW.

TNR turned fan favorites by siding with FMW to feud with Kodo Fuyuki's ECW Japan group. On April 3, Kanemura represented FMW against ECW Japan in a FMW vs. ECW series, losing to ECW Japan member Balls Mahoney. At Night in Shibuya Backdraft Eve, TNR lost the 6-Man Tag Team Championship to Kodo Fuyuki, Kyoko Inoue and Chocoball Mukai, but regained the title on May 3. At 11th Anniversary Show, Kanemura defeated Ryuji Yamakawa to win the Hardcore Championship while Gedo, Jado and Nakagawa retained the 6-Man Tag Team Championship against Willie Williams, former TNR member Willie Takayama and Williams' students Bouzu and Megane. On May 28, Nakagawa turned on Jado and Gedo during a 6-Man Tag Team Championship defense against Kodo Fuyuki, Kyoko Inoue and Chocoball Mukai and left TNR to join Fuyuki's Shin Fuyuki-Gun group. This forced Kanemura to finally disband TNR on June 16 as he joined Shin Fuyuki-Gun.

=== World Entertainment Wrestling (2002–2003) ===
On September 14, 2002, Hido, Tetsuhiro Kuroda and TAKA Michinoku took on Dick Togo, Kintaro Kanemura and Masao Orihara for the Apex of Triangle Championship at a show for Kodo Fuyuki's World Entertainment Wrestling (WEW), a replacement for FMW, which closed in 2002. Hido turned on Kuroda and helped the opposing team win the match. Hido reformed TNR with Fuyuki, Kanemura, Dick Togo and Orihara's Far East Connection group but the reunion did not last long as the group quietly closed in 2003 due to Fuyuki's death. The group performed TNR Dances on many occasions to pay tribute to the group.

== Members ==
Member:	Tenure:	Notes:
Mr. Gannosuke/Hayabusa	January 7, 1998–November 20, 1998; May 5, 1999–November 23, 1999	Gannosuke was the group's founding member and leader until he was injured and Kodo Fuyuki replaced him as the group leader. Gannosuke rejoined TNR on May 5 and left the group by forming a team with H after H defeated him.
Kodo Fuyuki	January 7, 1998–November 23, 1999	Fuyuki was the group's founding member and took over Mr. Gannosuke's spot as the leader of the team after Gannosuke was injured on April 30, 1998. Fuyuki left the group as he was forced to leave FMW due to losing a match to Masato Tanaka on November 23, 1999.
Yukihiro/Kintaro Kanemura	January 7, 1998–June 16, 2000	Kanemura was the group's founding member and took over as the group's leader after Kodo Fuyuki was forced to leave FMW due to losing to Masato Tanaka on November 23, 1999.
Jado	January 7, 1998–January 6, 1999; May 5, 1999–June 16, 2000	Jado was the group's founding member and quit TNR due to differences with Kodo Fuyuki. Jado reunited with Gedo to join TNR on May 5 and remained with the group until its dissolution.
Miss Mongol	January 1998–March 1998	
Gedo	February 4, 1998–June 16, 2000	Gedo joined the group in February 1998 and remained with the group until its dissolution.
Go Ito	February 19, 1998–January 16, 1999	Ito turned on ZEN to join TNR and left the group due to differences with Kodo Fuyuki.
Hido	March 1998–December 12, 1999	Hido was an ally of TNR during the group's formation and was added into the group in March. He left the group to change his character to Willie Takayama.
Super Leather	March 13, 1998–June 19, 1998	
Horace Boulder	March 13, 1998–April 30, 1998	
Hideki Hosaka	May 25, 1998–August 11, 1998	Hosaka was forced to join TNR after Atsushi Onita's team lost a match with the stipulation that TNR would pick a member from Onita's team if Onita's team lost. Onita would free Hosaka from TNR by beating them in a match on August 11.
Tetsuhiro Kuroda	May 26, 1998–August 11, 1998	Kuroda was forced to join TNR after Atsushi Onita's team lost a match with the stipulation that TNR would pick a member from Onita's team if Onita's team lost. Onita would free Kuroda from TNR by beating them in a match on August 11.
Koji Nakagawa	May 31, 1998–May 28, 2000	Nakagawa joined the group by turning on Atsushi Onita on May 31 and then double-crossed TNR to join Kodo Fuyuki in Shin Fuyuki-Gun and changed his ring name to GOEMON.
Masao Orihara	September 8, 1998–December 17, 1998	Orihara and Ono were kicked out of TNR after Gedo caused them to get eliminated from a match due to their failures.
Takeshi Ono	September 8, 1998–December 17, 1998	Orihara and Ono were kicked out of TNR after Gedo caused them to get eliminated from a match due to their failures.
Kaoruko Arai	September 20, 1998–November 20, 1998; July 31, 1999–November 23, 1999	Arai was kidnapped and hypnotized by Go Ito into joining TNR until regaining her senses and quitting the group. Arai re-joined the group in July 1999 and left it after Kodo Fuyuki was forced to quit in November 1999.
Shoichi Arai	May 31, 1999–September 24, 1999	Kodo Fuyuki brainwashed Arai into making him the FMW Commissioner and Arai joined TNR. Arai quit the group due to differences with Fuyuki.

== Championships and accomplishments ==
- Frontier Martial-Arts Wrestling
  - FMW Brass Knuckles Heavyweight Championship (3 times) - Mr. Gannosuke (1), Kodo Fuyuki (1), Yukihiro Kanemura (1)
  - FMW Brass Knuckles Tag Team Championship (2 times) - Mr. Gannosuke and Yukihiro Kanemura (1), Kodo Fuyuki and Hido (1), Kodo Fuyuki and Yukihiro Kanemura (1), Koji Nakagawa and Gedo (1)
  - FMW Independent Heavyweight Championship (3 times) - Mr. Gannosuke (2), Kodo Fuyuki (1)
  - FMW World Street Fight 6-Man Tag Team Championship (3 times) - Mr. Gannosuke, Yukihiro Kanemura and Jado (1), Kodo Fuyuki, Yukihiro Kanemura and Hido (1), Kodo Fuyuki, Koji Nakagawa and Yukihiro Kanemura (1)
  - WEW 6-Man Tag Team Championship (3 times) - Kodo Fuyuki, Koji Nakagawa and Gedo (1), Koji Nakagawa, Jado and Gedo (2)
  - WEW World Heavyweight Championship (1 time) - Kodo Fuyuki (1)
  - WEW World Tag Team Championship (2 times) - Koji Nakagawa and Gedo
  - FMW/WEW Hardcore Championship (2 times) - Kintaro Kanemura
