= Koji Nakagawa =

Japanese professional wrestler (born 1968)

- Born: June 26, 1968 (age 58); Setagaya, Tokyo, Japan
- Occupation: Professional wrestler
- Years active: 1992–present
- Spouse: Yoko Ikeda
- Professional wrestling career
- Ring name(s): Koji Nakagawa; Goemon
- Billed height: 1.75 m (5 ft 9 in)
- Billed weight: 90 kg (198 lb)
- Trained by: Tarzan Goto
- Debut: March 20, 1992

Koji Nakagawa (中川 浩二, Nakagawa Koji; born June 26, 1968) is a Japanese semi-retired professional wrestler best known for his work in Frontier Martial-Arts Wrestling (FMW) between 1992 and 2002. He is perhaps best known for his “Hitman” character, heavily inspired by Canadian professional wrestler Bret Hart. Nakagawa also wrestled as Goemon between 2000 and 2002, a dark thief character that was eventually killed and turned into a ghost in storyline.

== Professional wrestling career ==
=== Frontier Martial-Arts Wrestling ===
==== Early years (1992–1994) ====
An amateur wrestler in his scholastic years, Nakagawa debuted for Frontier Martial-Arts Wrestling (FMW) on March 20, 1992 in a losing effort against Eiji Ezaki. After two months in the lower card, he wrestled his very first main event match by teaming with Atsushi Onita to defeat Sambo Asako and Mr. Gannosuke in a tag team match on May 31. As a rookie, he was utilized in opening matches against fellow rookies during the early years of his career and would often put over major stars. The first win of Nakagawa's career was an eight-man battle royal on August 23. His first big match took place at the company's 3rd Anniversary Show, where he teamed with Eiji Ezaki against Chris Jericho and Kevin Faule in a losing effort. He picked up his first win in singles competition against Ezaki on October 17. His next major show appearance was at the 4th Anniversary Show from Kawasaki Stadium on May 5, 1993, where he lost to Eiji Ezaki in the opening match. He defeated Chiaki Matsuyama via submission at Summer Spectacular on August 22.

Nakagawa participated in a tournament for the newly created Independent World Junior Heavyweight Championship, in which he defeated Eiji Ezaki in the opening round but injured his arm, which put him out of action and Ezaki replaced him in the semi-final round. Nakagawa returned to FMW on November 19 by losing to Masato Tanaka. At the 5th Anniversary Show on May 5, 1994, Nakagawa teamed with Battle Ranger Z and Masato Tanaka to defeat the Michinoku Pro Wrestling's team of The Great Sasuke, Hanzo Nakajima and Shiryu. In his next major match later that year at Summer Spectacular, Nakagawa teamed with Katsutoshi Niiyama and Tetsuhiro Kuroda to defeat Battle Ranger Z, Masato Tanaka and Gosaku Goshogawara.

==== Independent World Junior Heavyweight Champion (1995–1996) ====
In 1995, Nakagawa would adopt the "Hitman" persona, reminiscent of Bret Hart, wearing similar ring attire to Hart and receiving a theme song similar to Hart’s theme, "Hart Attack". On March 30, Nakagawa defeated Hideki Hosaka to win his first title, the Independent World Junior Heavyweight Championship. The title was vacated later that year for unknown reasons. In the summer of 1995, Nakagawa participated in the Young Spirit Tournament, featuring the new generation of wrestlers that represented FMW after the departure of Atsushi Onita. He scored four points in the tournament by defeating Tetsuhiro Kuroda and Hideki Hosaka. On November 20, Nakagawa defeated Ricky Fuji to win his second Independent World Junior Heavyweight Championship. The following month, Nakagawa went to the United States to wrestle three matches for Extreme Championship Wrestling (ECW), which included losses to El Puerto Ricano and Taz at Holiday Hell and a title shot against Mikey Whipwreck for the ECW World Television Championship, where Whipwreck retained the title.

In early 1996, Nakagawa began feuding with Kaientai Deluxe after Kaientai DX members Taka Michinoku and Shoichi Funaki stole Nakagawa's Independent World Junior Heavyweight Championship title belt after Nakagawa and Wild Shooter defeated the team of Michinoku and Funaki in a match on February 23. Nakagawa successfully defended the title against Funaki on April 21 before losing the title to Michinoku at the 7th Anniversary Show. Nakagawa would then participate in a tournament for the newly created Independent Heavyweight Championship, losing to the eventual winner W*ING Kanemura in the opening round on June 27. Nakagawa would then fight as a fan favorite alongside FMW to feud with W*ING Alliance, Puerto Rican Army and Lethal Weapon. He was also promoted as an off-screen booker of FMW. On June 28, Nakagawa teamed with Masato Tanaka and Tetsuhiro Kuroda to defeat Super Leather and The Headhunters to win the World Street Fight 6-Man Tag Team Championship. After the title win, Nakagawa spotted Hayabusa watching the match backstage and confronted him for leaving FMW to fight Puerto Rican Army at a time when FMW needed him. As a result, both men competed in a match at Summer Spectacular, which Hayabusa won. However, the match was considered a disappointment and both men competed in a rematch on August 23, which Nakagawa won and then the two reconciled to fight as a team on the FMW side. Nakagawa, Tanaka and Kuroda lost the World Street Fight 6-Man Tag Team Championship to Hisakatsu Oya and The Headhunters on November 16 and failed in a rematch on February 19, 1997.

==== ZEN and Team No Respect (1997–2000) ====
Nakagawa began feuding with Katsutoshi Niiyama, after Niiyama joined the Funk Masters of Wrestling and the two competed in a match at 8th Anniversary Show, which Nakagawa won. After the match, both men embraced and Niiyama left FMW. Nakagawa won his second World Street Fight 6-Man Tag Team Championship by teaming with Hayabusa and Masato Tanaka to defeat Hisakatsu Oya, Mr. Gannosuke and The Gladiator on August 31, 1997. At Kawasaki Legend: Fall Spectacular, Nakagawa participated in a Royal Rumble match, which was won by Tetsuhiro Kuroda. They lost the title to the newly formed stable ZEN members Atsushi Onita, Hido and Tetsuhiro Kuroda on October 14. Nakagawa grew upset with his position in the company as FMW President Shoichi Arai had promised him of a push but he was restricted to wrestle in the undercard. On December 13, Nakagawa attacked Hayabusa after Hayabusa praised FMW and screamed at him for praising the company after it had lied to him for giving him the push but had almost released him. On the final day of the Super Extreme Wrestling War tour, Nakagawa joined ZEN by rescuing Atsushi Onita from an assault by his teammates Mr. Gannosuke and Yukihiro Kanemura after Onita had lost a WarGames match to Hayabusa, Masato Tanaka and Jinsei Shinzaki.

On January 7, 1998, the team of Atsushi Onita, Koji Nakagawa and Tetsuhiro Kuroda defeated Mr. Gannosuke, Yukihiro Kanemura and Hido at ZEN's first promoted show. After the match, Gannosuke, Kanemura and Hido, along with Fuyuki-Gun attacked ZEN and merged to form Team No Respect. On February 13, Onita, Nakagawa and Kuroda defeated Gannosuke, Kanemura and Jado to win the World Street Fight 6-Man Tag Team Championship. Nakagawa participated in a tournament to determine the #1 contender for the Double Championship (the unified Brass Knuckles Heavyweight Championship and the Independent Heavyweight Championship), in which he lost to Yukihiro Kanemura in the opening round. Nakagawa competed against Hisakatsu Oya and Chris Chetti in a three-way dance at FMW's first pay-per-view event 9th Anniversary Show on April 30, 1998, where he was the first to get eliminated. On May 5, ZEN lost the title to TNR's Kodo Fuyuki, Hido and Yukihiro Kanemura after Nakagawa suffered a shoulder injury and was pinned in a match which stipulated that ZEN would be forced to disband. On May 31, Nakagawa teamed with Onita to challenge Fuyuki and Kanemura for the Brass Knuckles Tag Team Championship. Nakagawa turned on Onita by smashing Go Ito's crutch on Onita's back and helping Fuyuki and Kanemura retain the title. Nakagawa turned villain for the first time in his career and revealed that the injury was a ruse to end ZEN and then joined Team No Respect. Go Ito gave him the nickname "Mr. Double Cross" on his betrayal of Onita.

A day later, Nakagawa teamed with Fuyuki and Kanemura to defeat Hayabusa, Masato Tanaka and Hisakatsu Oya to win the vacant World Street Fight 6-Man Tag Team Championship. The following month, on July 10, Nakagawa pinned Hayabusa in an eight-man elimination tag team match, which led Hayabusa to challenge Nakagawa to a match at the Welcome to the Darkside pay-per-view, where Nakagawa defeated "Darkside of Hayabusa" with the help of Mr. Gannosuke. This earned Nakagawa, a title shot against Hayabusa for the Double Championship on October 6, where Hayabusa retained the title. The World Street Fight 6-Man Tag Team Championship was retired on November 20 and awarded to the departing Atsushi Onita as a tribute by Shoichi Arai for establishing FMW. Nakagawa then participated in the Over the Top Tournament to become the #1 contender for the Double Championship, losing to eventual winner Mr. Gannosuke in the opening round at ECW/FMW Supershow I.

In 1999, Nakagawa teamed with TNR teammate Gedo to participate in a tournament for the vacant Brass Knuckles Tag Team Championship, where they scored ten points and qualified for the play-off, where they lost to Masato Tanaka and Tetsuhiro Kuroda on May 3. On June 13, Nakagawa and Gedo defeated Tanaka and Kuroda to win the title. They successfully defended the title against Sabu and Super Leather on June 15 and the title was replaced with the WEW World Tag Team Championship on June 16, with Nakagawa and Gedo being crowned the first WEW Tag Team Champions by Kodo Fuyuki. They also won the new WEW 6-Man Tag Team Championship with Fuyuki by defeating Hayabusa, Masato Tanaka and Tetsuhiro Kuroda in the final of a tournament on July 31 during the Goodbye Hayabusa tour. At Hayabusa Graduation Ceremony, Nakagawa and Gedo lost the WEW Tag Team Championship to Tetsuhiro Kuroda and Hisakatsu Oya. At Last Match, the team of Kodo Fuyuki, Koji Nakagawa and Gedo successfully defended the WEW 6-Man Tag Team Championship against Tetsuhiro Kuroda, Hisakatsu Oya and Yoshinori Sasaki. They lost the title to Masato Tanaka, Tetsuhiro Kuroda and Hisakatsu Oya on September 23.

At 10th Anniversary Show, Nakagawa teamed with his Team No Respect teammates Jado and Gedo to take on Ricky Fuji, Flying Kid Ichihara and Chocoball Mukai for the vacant WEW 6-Man Tag Team Championship, which the latter team won. However, Nakagawa, Jado and Gedo defeated Fuji, Ichihara and Mukai in a rematch to win the title on December 11. Following the departure of Kodo Fuyuki from TNR, the rest of the group turned fan favorites and feuded with the ECW Japan group. On February 25, 2000, Nakagawa and Gedo defeated the team of Hideki Hosaka and Yoshinori Sasaki, Hisakatsu Oya and Naohiko Yamazaki and Jado and Kintaro Kanemura in a four corners match to become the #1 contenders for the WEW Tag Team Championship, which they won by defeating Kodo Fuyuki and Kyoko Inoue on April 1. At Night in Shibuya Backdraft Eve, the team of Nakagawa, Jado and Gedo lost the WEW 6-Man Tag Team Championship to Kodo Fuyuki, Kyoko Inoue and Chocoball Mukai, but regained it in a rematch on May 3. They successfully defended the title against Willie Takayama, Willie Williams, Bouzu and Megane at 11th Anniversary Show. Nakagawa, Jado and Gedo lost the title to Kodo Fuyuki, Kyoko Inoue and Chocoball Mukai on May 28 after Nakagawa hit Gedo with the title belt and turned on Team No Respect to leave the group and join Fuyuki's group, which would be called Shin Fuyuki-Gun.

==== GOEMON (2000–2002) ====
After joining Shin Fuyuki-Gun in 2000, Nakagawa debuted a new gimmick on May 30 named GOEMON, a dark thief character based on the historic Japanese thief Goemon Ishikawa. Under the new persona, he began feuding with Onryo, a ghost wrestler after GOEMON and Kintaro Kanemura defeated Masato Tanaka and Onryo on August 28. Goemon defeated Onryo in their first singles encounter on October 10. Onryo later brought an item called the Belt of Curse and put it on the line in their feud, revealing it was a cursed object which would be granted to the loser and would slowly kill him if he held it, and that it was what killed Onryo in the first place and turned him into a ghost. After losing to Onryo at Deep Throat, Goemon was handcuffed to the belt and it started to kill him, weakening him and making him cough up blood during his matches. He also started to wear a half mask to hide the fact that half of his face was turning white like Onryo's. Goemon lost rematches to Onryo on November 28 and December 10, and was forced to keep the belt and eventually died in storyline after bleeding profusely. He returned as Onryo's mystery tag team partner on December 20 against Shinjuku Shark and Naohiko Yamazaki, explaining he had also become a ghost and that they both had shared a bond in dying, which would turn Goemon into a fan favorite. During this time, Nakagawa was promoted to head trainer at the FMW Dojo.

On January 7, 2001, Goemon and Onryo defeated Hideki Hosaka and Mammoth Sasaki to win the WEW Hardcore Tag Team Championship after Hosaka turned on Sasaki. They lost the title to Kintaro Kanemura and Ryuji Yamakawa on February 23. On April 15, the team of Goemon, Onryo and The Great Sasuke lost to Team Kuroda (Tetsuhiro Kuroda, Mr. Gannosuke and Mammoth Sasaki). At 12th Anniversary Show, Goemon and Onryo defeated Super Crazy and Crazy Boy to win the vacant WEW World Tag Team Championship. After a four month reign, Goemon and Onryo dropped the title to Gannosuke and Sasaki on September 5. The titles would later be won by the team of Hayabusa and Tetsuhiro Kuroda, who vacated it on November 5, after Hayabusa suffered a career ending injury. Goemon and Onryo participated in a tournament for the vacant title by losing to Mr. Gannosuke and Tetsuhiro Kuroda in the first round on December 21. Nakagawa's last FMW match took place on February 4, 2002, in which he teamed with Kintaro Kanemura and Mammoth Sasaki to defeat Mitsunobu Kikuzawa, Paul DeLuc and Vic Grimes. This would turn out to be FMW's last show as Shoichi Arai closed FMW due to bankruptcy on February 25.

=== Wrestlings Marvelous Future ===
==== Brand Double Cross (2002–2003) ====
After the dissolution of FMW, Nakagawa, along with several FMW alumni joined Mr. Gannosuke's new promotion Wrestlings Marvelous Future (WMF), which was based on promoting younger talent. His first match for WMF on its pre-debut show took place on August 18, 2002, when he teamed with Mammoth Sasaki, Ricky Fuji and Soldier against Garuda, Mr. Gannosuke, Seiji Ikeda and Onryo in a losing effort in an eight-man tag team match. On August 28, GOEMON participated in WMF's debut show The Independence Day, where he teamed with Onryo and Darkness Dragon against Dragon Kid, The Great Sasuke and Tiger Mask IV in a losing effort. Later that night, GOEMON turned heel by attacking Mr. Gannosuke and Jinsei Shinzaki with a baseball bat after Mitsuhiro Matsunaga had cost Gannosuke and Shinzaki, a match against Hisakatsu Oya and Tetsuhiro Kuroda. GOEMON formed a villainous faction called Brand Double Cross with Tetsuhiro Kuroda, Hisakatsu Oya and Sukeiyo, based on his "Mr. Double Cross" moniker, thus ending Goemon's affiliation with Onryo. On November 10, Goemon unsuccessfully challenged Flying Kid Ichihara for the NMC Junior Heavyweight Championship. At Marvelous Days 1st, Goemon and Sukeiyo defeated Asian Cougar and Flying Kid Ichihara.

On December 21, Goemon and Tetsuhiro Kuroda took on Mr. Gannosuke and Jinsei Shinzaki in a match, during which Gannosuke turned on Shinzaki and then joined Goemon in taking out Kuroda as well. This signified that Gannosuke joined Brand Double Cross and Kuroda was kicked out of the group. Gannosuke left the group in early 2003 due to friction with Hisakatsu Oya and formed his own group with his lookalikes called The Guns. On March 9, the team of Goemon, Hisakatsu Oya and Soldier lost to Guns. On March 23, Goemon brought out Mr. Pogo as his new partner as he, Oya and Pogo lost to The Guns via disqualification. Guns began gaining dominance in WMF and their prominence led to Brand Double Cross being relegated to a secondary group in the mid-card. During this time, Ricky Fuji joined the group. At Marvelous Days 2nd, Goemon and his stablemates Hisakatsu Oya and Ricky Fuji defeated Asian Cougar, Flying Kid Ichihara and Mineo Fujita. Goemon participated in a tournament for the new Junior Heavyweight Championship, in which he lost to Ikeda-kun in the opening round. On July 7, Goemon and Gentaro defeated Hido and Chocoball Mukai in a match at a Fuyuki Army show and after the match, Hido attacked Goemon and Gentaro until Onryo made the save for them and Goemon turned back into a fan favorite by shaking Onryo's hands and the two reunited as a tag team and then Goemon disbanded Brand Double Cross.

==== Junior Heavyweight Champion and KHM Army (2003–2007) ====
Upon reuniting with Onryo, Goemon began competing in WMF's junior heavyweight division. Goemon and Onryo's first match as a tag team took place at Marvelous Days 3rd on July 25, where the two lost to Gentaro and Taka Michinoku. At Flash! 1st Stage, Gentaro and Goemon defeated Onryo and Tomoya Adachi. Later that night, at the company's 1st Anniversary Show, Goemon and Onryo lost to Dick Togo and Ikuto Hidaka. At Flash! 2nd Stage, Goemon unsuccessfully challenged Tomoya Adachi for the Junior Heavyweight Championship. At Marvelous Days 5th, Goemon and Onryo lost to Naohiro Hoshikawa and Yoshihito Sasaki. At Marvelous Days 6th, Goemon teamed with Kintaro Kanemura and Tetsuhiro Kuroda against Jinsei Shinzaki, Kazuya Yuasa and Seiji Ikeda in a losing effort. At Marvelous Days 7th, the team of Goemon, Chocoball Mukai and Mr. Gannosuke lost to Koichiro Kimura, Ricky Fuji and Yoji Anjo.

At Marvelous Days 8th, Goemon and Tetsuhiro Kuroda defeated Hideki Hosaka and Ricky Fuji. Goemon continued to compete in the junior heavyweight division until WMF temporarily closed down in early 2004. The promotion returned on August 7. At 2nd Anniversary Show Part 1, Goemon teamed with Mr. Gannosuke against Garuda and Seiji Ikeda in a losing effort. At 2nd Anniversary Show Part 2, the team of Goemon, Junji Tanaka and Onryo lost to Mammoth Sasaki, Seiya Morohashi and Tomohiko Hashimoto. Goemon participated in the WMF Round Robin Tournament, in which he scored six points, winning three matches and losing four of his matches in the tournament. On April 1, 2005, Goemon defeated Onryo in a hardcore match to win the Junior Heavyweight Championship. He made his first successful title defense against Mineo Fujita on May 14. In the summer of 2005, WMF's financial backers Laing, Inc. pulled out of the promotion, which led the company to suffer financially and the Junior Heavyweight Championship was disbanded as a result. Goemon continued to wrestle for the company in the mid-card while also took independent bookings. At 4th Anniversary Show, Goemon, Asian Cougar and Kitten Kid lost to Isami, Onryo and Tomoya Adachi.

In 2007, Goemon teamed with Keiichi Kono in the Marvelous Future Tag Team Tournament, where they lost to Kitten Kid and Mineo Fujita in the opening round on January 13. On April 14, the team of Goemon and Hideki Hosaka took on Mr. Gannosuke and Soldier in a tag team match, which ended in a no contest after all four men united with each other and left WMF in storyline to feud with WMF and formed a villainous alliance called KHM Army. However, Goemon left the promotion in the midst of the feud after defeating Chon Shiryu at 5th Anniversary Show on August 28.

=== Independent circuit (2002–present) ===
After FMW folded down in 2002, Nakagawa mainly competed in WMF alternating between his real name and Goemon character but also began competing in various independent promotions including Dramatic Dream Team (DDT), Ice Ribbon, Pro Wrestling Zero1, 666 and Fuyuki Army Promotion. In the fall of 2003, Goemon and Onryo participated in a tournament for the new NWA International Lightweight Tag Team Championship, in which they lost to eventual winners Ikuto Hidaka and Dick Togo in the semi-final round. Nakagawa was one of the founding members of the Apache Army group in 2003 and the group consisted of various FMW alumni and Japanese independent wrestlers. The group evolved to become a promotion in 2004. After leaving WMF in 2007, Nakagawa became a freelancer on the independent circuit and became less active after 2010.

== Personal life ==
Nakagawa is married to female professional wrestler Yoko Ikeda, who also wrestled for FMW during her career. They have five children.

== Championships and accomplishments ==
- Frontier Martial-Arts Wrestling / World Entertainment Wrestling
  - FMW Brass Knuckles Tag Team Championship (1 time) – with Gedo
  - FMW Independent World Junior Heavyweight Championship (2 times)
  - FMW World Street Fight 6-Man Tag Team Championship (4 times) – with Masato Tanaka and Tetsuhiro Kuroda (1), Hayabusa and Masato Tanaka (1), Atsushi Onita and Tetsuhiro Kuroda (1), and Kodo Fuyuki and Yukihiro Kanemura (1)
  - WEW 6-Man Tag Team Championship (4 times) – with Gedo (3), Jado (2), Kodo Fuyuki (1), Hayabusa (1), and Tetsuhiro Kuroda (1)
  - WEW Hardcore Tag Team Championship (1 time) – with Onryo
  - WEW Tag Team Championship (3 times) – with Gedo (2) and Onryo (1)
  - WEW 6-Man Tag Team Championship Tournament (1999) - with Kodo Fuyuki and Gedo
- Wrestling Marvelous Future
  - WMF Junior Heavyweight Championship (1 time, final)
