= FMW World Street Fight 6-Man Tag Team Championship =

Professional wrestling trios tag team championship

Details
- Promotion: Frontier Martial-Arts Wrestling; Cho Sento Puroresu FMW
- Date established: May 5, 1996
- Date retired: October 27, 2016
Statistics
- First champion(s): Puerto Rican Army (Super Leather, Headhunter A and Headhunter B)
- Most reigns: Atsushi Onita, Masato Tanaka and W*ING / Yukihiro Kanemura (4 reigns)
- Longest reign: Atsushi Onita, Hideki Hosaka and Sean Guinness (244 days)
- Shortest reign: Funk Masters of Wrestling (The Gladiator, Hisakatsu Oya and Mr. Gannosuke) (26 days)

The FMW World Street Fight 6-Man Tag Team Championship was a championship in Frontier Martial-Arts Wrestling. It was initially active from May 1996 until May 1999. The title was abandoned by Shoichi Arai on November 20, 1998 and presented to the departing Atsushi Onita as a tribute to Onita for founding FMW and taking the company to a major level. The title was replaced in July 1999 with the WEW 6-Man Tag Team Championship.

On October 30, 2015, it was announced that the FMW World Street Fight 6-Man Tag Team Championship will be reactivated for the newly-resurrected FMW promotion. The new champions were determined on December 22. The title was again deactivated in October 2016.

== Title history ==
No.	Champion	Reign	Date	Days held	Location	Event	Notes	Ref.
1	Puerto Rican Army (Super Leather, Headhunter A and Headhunter B)	1	May 5, 1996	54	Kawasaki, Japan	7th Anniversary Show	Defeated The Gladiator, Hisakatsu Oya and Horace Boulder to win the title	
2	Masato Tanaka, Koji Nakagawa and Tetsuhiro Kuroda	1	June 28, 1996	141	Tokyo, Japan	FMW		
3	Funk Masters of Wrestling (Hisakatsu Oya, Headhunter A (2) and Headhunter B (2))	1	November 16, 1996	125	Osaka, Japan	FMW		
4	Fuyuki-Gun (Kodo Fuyuki, Jado and Gedo)	1	March 21, 1997	109	Sendai, Japan	FMW		
Vacant		N/A	July 8, 1997	N/A	N/A			
5	Funk Masters of Wrestling (The Gladiator, Hisakatsu Oya (2) and Mr. Gannosuke)	1	August 5, 1997	26	Sapporo, Japan	FMW	Defeated Kodo Fuyuki and Jado and Gedo for the vacant title	
6	Hayabusa, Masato Tanaka (2) and Koji Nakagawa (2)	1	August 31, 1997	44	Yokohama, Japan	FMW		
7	ZEN (Atsushi Onita, Tetsuhiro Kuroda (2) and Hido)	1	October 14, 1997	67	Sapporo, Japan	FMW		
8	Hayabusa (2), Masato Tanaka (3) and Hisakatsu Oya (3)	1	December 20, 1997	27	Osaka, Japan	Super Extreme Wrestling War tour		
9	Team No Respect (Mr. Gannosuke (2), Yukihiro Kanemura and Jado (2))	1	January 16, 1998	28	Yokkaichi, Japan	FMW		
10	ZEN (Atsushi Onita (2), Koji Nakagawa (3) and Tetsuhiro Kuroda (3))	1	February 13, 1998	81	Chiba, Japan	FMW		
11	Team No Respect (Kodo Fuyuki (2), Yukihiro Kanemura (2) and Hido (2))	1	May 5, 1998	27	Wakayama, Japan	FMW		
Vacant			June 1, 1998		Osaka, Japan	Neo FMW tour		
12	Team No Respect (Kodo Fuyuki (3), Koji Nakagawa (3) and Yukihiro Kanemura (3))	1	June 1, 1998	172	Osaka, Japan	Neo FMW tour	Defeated Hayabusa, Masato Tanaka and Hisakatsu Oya for the vacant title.	
Vacant		N/A	November 20, 1998		N/A		Title retired.	
13	Atsushi Onita (3), Masato Tanaka (4), and Hideki Hosaka	1	December 22, 2015	33	Tokyo, Japan	25+2 Anniversary Series Origin Return - Day 3	Defeated NOSAWA Rongai, Raijin Yaguchi, and Tomohiko Hashimoto in a decision match for the re-activated titles.	
14	W*ING Kanemura (4), Raijin Yaguchi, and Tomohiko Hashimoto	1	January 24, 2016	33	Tokyo, Japan	Everyday Battle In The City	Wing Kanemura previously known as Yukihiro Kanemura	
15	Atsushi Onita (4), Hideki Hosaka (2), and Sean Guinness	1	February 26, 2016	244	Tokyo, Japan	For Whom The Glory Is - Day 2	Defeated Yaguchi, Nosawa Rongai and Sabu. This was a Barbed Wire Board, Barricade Mats Scramble Bunkhouse Tornado Lumberjack, Certified Weapon OK and Grossing 7,000,000 Yen Contention Death Match.	
Deactivated		N/A	October 27, 2016		N/A		Title deactivated and replaced with the FMW World Street Fight 8-Man Tag Team Championship.	
