= Hido =

Japanese professional wrestler (1969–2021)

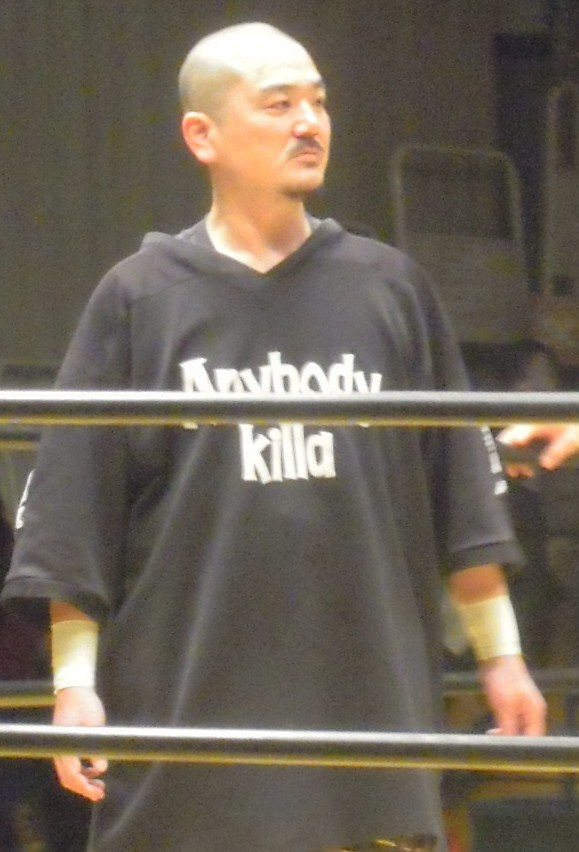
- Hido in 2013

Personal information
- Born: Hideo Takayama; October 19, 1969 Osaka, Japan
- Died: October 17, 2021 (aged 51)
- Spouse: Megumi Kudo (m. 1998)

Professional wrestling career
- Ring name(s): BADBOY Hido; Hido; Hido Takayama; Hideo Takayama; Willie Takayama; Yaiba
- Billed height: 6 ft 1 in (1.85 m)
- Billed weight: 231 lb (105 kg)
- Billed from: Osaka, Japan
- Debut: January 20, 1993
- Retired: May 4, 2013

Hideo Takayama (高山 秀男, Takayama Hideo; October 19, 1969 – October 17, 2021) was a Japanese professional wrestler, better known under the ring name BADBOY Hido (BADBOY非道, Baddobōi Hidō) or simply Hido (非道, Hidō). He is best known for his time with hardcore wrestling federations Big Japan Pro Wrestling (BJW), Independent Wrestling Association Mid-South (IWA-MS), Frontier Martial-Arts Wrestling (FMW) and Wrestling International New Generations (W*ING).

== Professional wrestling career ==
=== W*ING (1993–1994) ===
Hideo Takayama made his professional wrestling debut for Wrestling International New Generations (W*ING) against Masahiko Takasugi in a losing effort on January 20, 1993 at an interpromotional show between W*ING, Michinoku Pro Wrestling (MPW) and Union Pro Wrestling (UPW). Takayama picked up his first win against Ryo Miyake on October 23. At Odawara Brazing Night in Odawara, Takayama developed himself as a villain by shortening his given name to "Hido", but lost to Takashi Okano. Hido would lose most of his matches during his early career in W*ING but learned the hardcore wrestling style of W*ING which would continue with him throughout his career. He began feuding with Yukihiro Kanemura, which culminated in a loser leaves W*ING street fight on February 15, 1994, which Hido lost, forcing him to leave W*ING. Coincidentally, W*ING disbanded shortly after Hido's departure from the promotion.

=== Wrestle Association R / Wrestle and Romance (1994) ===
After leaving W*ING, Takayama joined Wrestle Association R (WAR), where he debuted for the promotion on June 1 under a new character Yaiba by teaming with Arashi and Ashura Hara to defeat Genichiro Tenryu, Animal Hamaguchi and Koji Ishinriki in a six-man tag team match. On June 3, Yaiba defeated Matsuoka in his first singles match and faced Koki Kitahara in a match later at the event, which Yaiba won by disqualification. This led to a rematch between the two on June 5, which Yaiba lost. Takayama soon dropped the Yaiba character and began competing under his real name. On June 30, Takayama teamed with Hiroshi Itakura and Ichiro Yaguchi against Fuyuki-Gun in a losing effort in the quarter-final round of a tournament to crown the promotion's first World Six-Man Tag Team Champions. Takayama joined Frontier Martial-Arts Wrestling (FMW) in the fall of 1994, which would lead to his departure from WAR. His last match took place on October 16, in which Takayama and Yaguchi lost to Jado and Gedo.

=== Frontier Martial-Arts Wrestling ===
==== W*ING Alliance (1994–1997) ====
Takayama debuted in FMW on October 9 as a member of W*ING Alliance, a group consisting of former wrestlers from the defunct W*ING who wanted to avenge the end of W*ING from Atsushi Onita and his FMW and they aimed to end FMW. His debut match was a six-man tag team match with W*ING members Hideki Hosaka and Mitsuhiro Matsunaga against FMW's Koji Nakagawa, Battle Ranger Z and Masato Tanaka, which W*ING won. Hido mainly competed as a mid-carder and was usually utilized in tag team matches alongside W*ING members while losing in singles competition. Hido picked up his first win in a singles match in FMW on April 24, 1995 against Gosaku Goshogawara. At 6th Anniversary Show, Hido, Hideki Hosaka and Mitsuhiro Matsunaga lost a match to Takashi Ishikawa, Apollo Sagawa and Kishin Kawabata. Hido began getting more wins against lower-tier wrestlers of the company but failed to win against more established wrestlers. He participated in the Young Spirit Tournament to promote the younger generation of FMW which would lead the company after the company's ace Atsushi Onita retired from wrestling. Hido scored only four points with two wins against Koji Nakagawa and Tetsuhiro Kuroda, while losing to Hideki Hosaka, W*ING Kanemura and Masato Tanaka.

On September 26, Hido turned on his W*ING partners Hideki Hosaka and W*ING Kanemura in a match against Masato Tanaka, Koji Nakagawa and Tetsuhiro Kuroda to join Lethal Weapon and insulted W*ING for siding with FMW. Hido, along with Super Leather and other Lethal Weapons feuded with their former W*ING teammates for the next two months. On November 25, Hido and Super Leather rejoined W*ING in a swerve by turning on Horace Boulder against Hideki Hosaka, Mitsuhiro Matsunaga & W*ING Kanemura in a street fight. In early 1996, W*ING turned into fan favorites and formed an alliance with FMW after the formation of Funk Masters of Wrestling. At the 7th Anniversary Show, Hido, Hosaka and Matsunaga defeated Miguel Perez, Shoji Nakamaki and Toryu. This would be Matsunaga's last match in FMW as he left the company after the match.

On June 12, Hido competed as BADBOY Hido for the first time at a W*ING promoted show W*ING Take Off 2nd. Hido participated in a tournament to crown the inaugural Independent Heavyweight Champion, losing to Super Leather in the quarter-final. Hido's first major win of his FMW career took place at Summer Spectacular on August 1, where he won a Royal Rumble by last eliminating Tetsuhiro Kuroda. Hido received his first title shot on September 20 as he and Hideki Hosaka unsuccessfully challenged The Headhunters for the Brass Knuckles Tag Team Championship. On April 25, 1997, Hido and W*ING Kanemura defeated Headhunters to win the title thus ending Headhunters' year-long reign and Hido won the first championship of his career. At 8th Anniversary Show, Hido and Dragon Winger lost to Ricky Fuji and Ricky Morton. Hido lost to Kodo Fuyuki at Shiodome Legend. After holding the title for nearly four months, Hido and Kanemura lost the Brass Knuckles Tag Team Championship to Mr. Gannosuke and Hisakatsu Oya in their fourth title defense on August 21. W*ING Alliance was forced to disband after W*ING Kanemura lost a match to Atsushi Onita at Kawasaki Legend.

==== ZEN and Team No Respect (1997–1999) ====
After ending W*ING Alliance, Atsushi Onita became upset at FMW for not accepting W*ING wrestlers in their group and denounced himself as a member of FMW and then took Tetsuhiro Kuroda, Hideki Hosaka, Yukihiro Kanemura and Hido under his wing and formed ZEN. The group began feuding with FMW and Hido turned villain as a result. On October 14, Onita, Hido and Kuroda defeated Hayabusa, Masato Tanaka and Koji Nakagawa to win the World Street Fight 6-Man Tag Team Championship. They lost the title to Hayabusa, Tanaka and Hisakatsu Oya on December 20. Friction began rising in ZEN as Mr. Gannosuke, Kanemura and Hido became upset at Onita for booking himself in the main event of the December 19 show. They attacked Onita after Onita lost a WarGames match to Hayabusa on December 22 and then Gannosuke, Kanemura and Hido officially left ZEN.

On January 7, 1998, Gannosuke, Kanemura and Hido lost a street fight to ZEN's Atsushi Onita, Koji Nakagawa and Tetsuhiro Kuroda at ZEN's first promoted show. After the match, Fuyuki-Gun joined Gannosuke, Kanemura and Hido in attacking ZEN and both groups merged to form Team No Respect. Hido was involved in a hilarious skit of TNR in which the group mocked Hido's legitimate wedding with Megumi Kudo by holding their own wedding of Hido and Jado as "Megumi Jado" in their white underwears. On March 29, Hido and Kodo Fuyuki defeated their own TNR teammates Mr. Gannosuke and Yukihiro Kanemura to win the Brass Knuckles Tag Team Championship. They lost the title to Hayabusa and Masato Tanaka on April 17.

At 9th Anniversary Show, Hido picked up a major win by defeating ZEN member and former ally Hideki Hosaka. On May 5, Hido replaced the injured Mr. Gannosuke to team with Kodo Fuyuki and Yukihiro Kanemura to defeat Atsushi Onita, Koji Nakagawa and Tetsuhiro Kuroda for the World Street Fight 6-Man Tag Team Championship. On May 19, Hido and Super Leather took on their TNR teammates Jado and Gedo in a losing effort. On June 19, Hido picked up an upset win over Leather in a loser leaves TNR match with the help of Jado and Yukihiro Kanemura. As a result, Hido began feuding with Super Leather and the match culminated in a chain street fight between the two on July 10, which Leather won. Hido would lose to Leather in another rematch at Welcome to the Darkside.

On November 20, Hido teamed with Go Ito to defeat Kaori Nakayama and Ricky Fuji in an intergender tag team match. The following month, Hido participated in the Over the Top Tournament to determine the #1 contender for the Double Championship (the unified Brass Knuckles Heavyweight Championship and the Independent Heavyweight Championship). Hido defeated Takeshi Ono in the quarter-final and Masao Orihara in the final before losing to eventual winner Mr. Gannosuke in the semi-final. Orihara and Ono left TNR due to their differences with the group and Gedo and Hido defeated Orihara and Ono on January 5, 1999. On January 6, Hido lost to Ono to end the feud. Hido teamed with Yukihiro Kanemura to participate in a round robin tournament for the vacant Brass Knuckles Tag Team Championship and ended the tournament by losing all the matches. Hido continued to compete with TNR against FMW throughout the year.

==== Willie Takayama (1999–2000) ====
At 10th Anniversary Show, Hido faced karateka Willie Williams in a different style fight, losing via knockout in the second round. Williams respected Hido after the match. On December 12, Hido left TNR and changed his ring name to "Willie Takayama" in honor of Williams and developed the character of a karateka influenced by Williams. Takayama defeated Naohiko Yamazaki at the event. Takayama defeated Tarek Pasca on January 5, 2000 and unsuccessfully challenged Tetsuhiro Kuroda for the WEW World Heavyweight Championship on February 25. On April 30, Takayama and Williams unsuccessfully challenged Koji Nakagawa and Gedo for the WEW World Tag Team Championship. At 11th Anniversary Show, Takayama, Williams and Williams' students Bouzu and Megane unsuccessfully challenged Koji Nakagawa, Jado and Gedo for the WEW 6-Man Tag Team Championship. Takayama's final match in FMW came on May 27, when he and Yoshinori Sasaki lost to Michael Shane and Ruben Cruise.

=== Independent circuit (2001–2013) ===
Hido travelled to United States and worked for Independent Wrestling Association Mid-South (IWA-MS), debuting for the promotion against Sabu in a losing effort at No Blood, No Guts, No Glory on May 12, 2001. Hido participated in the promotion's King of the Deathmatch Tournament by defeating Bull Pain in the first round and then he was forced to withdraw from the tournament due to injury, thus forfeiting his quarter-final match against Corporal Robinson. Hido feuded with Necro Butcher during his tour in IWA-MS. On July 14, Hido defeated Chip Fairway and Trent Baker in a three-way dance to win the promotion's Mid-South Heavyweight Championship. Four days later, Hido lost a Loser Leaves IWA Mid-South match to Butcher, forcing him to leave the promotion and vacate the title.

Hido returned to Japan in 2002 and became a freelancer, working on several independent promotions. He would work Atsushi Onita's deathmatch ventures under the Onita Pro banner and for Kodo Fuyuki's World Entertainment Wrestling (WEW) promotion, a successor to FMW, which had closed in February 2002. On April 29, 2003, Hido and YOSHIYA defeated Ryuji Ito and Daisaku Shimoda to win the WEW Hardcore Tag Team Championship. The title was vacated shortly after. On December 19, Ryuji Ito and BADBOY Hido defeated Daikokubo Benkei and Abdullah Kobayashi in a cage deathmatch to win the BJW Tag Team Championship at a Big Japan Pro Wrestling (BJW) event. Ito and Hido lost the title to Men's Teioh and Mr. Big Japan on December 23. On August 19, 2004, Hido and Kintaro Kanemura defeated Kendo Kashin and Tomohiro Ishii to win the World Magma the Greatest Tag Team Championship at Riki Pro's Take Off event. Hido and Kanemura would split up and they competed at Crushing Each Other! where Hido teamed with Tetsuhiro Kuroda against Kanemura and Ishii, with both men putting their titles on the line. Hido and Kuroda won the match and Hido kept the title.

On August 6, 2006, Hido and Takashi Sasaki defeated Jun Kasai and Tetsuhiro Kuroda in the final of a round robin tournament to win the reactivated WEW World Tag Team Championship at an Apache Army show. They lost the title to Kasai and Tomoaki Honma in a scramble bunkhouse barbed wire baseball bat and ladder deathmatch at the company's 3rd Anniversary Show. Hido became semi-retired in 2008 by reducing his matches per year. Takayama wrestled his last match on May 4, 2013 at Pro Wrestling Zero1's Big Bang event by teaming with Hideki Hosaka and Kintaro Kanemura against Atsushi Onita, Tetsuhiro Kuroda and Ricky Fuji in a losing effort.

== Personal life ==
Takayama began dating fellow FMW wrestler Megumi Kudo during the mid-1990s and they got married on July 12, 1998. He died on October 17, 2021.

== Championships and accomplishments ==
- Big Japan Pro Wrestling
  - BJW Tag Team Championship (1 time) – with Ryuji Ito
- Fighting World of Japan Pro Wrestling
  - World Magma the Greatest Tag Team Championship (2 times) – with Kintaro Kanemura (1) and Tetsuhiro Kuroda (1)
- Frontier Martial-Arts Wrestling / World Entertainment Wrestling / Apache Army
  - FMW Brass Knuckles Tag Team Championship (2 times) – with W*ING Kanemura (1) and Kodo Fuyuki (1)
  - FMW World Street Fight 6-Man Tag Team Championship (2 times) – with Atsushi Onita and Tetsuhiro Kuroda (1), and Kodo Fuyuki and Kintaro Kanemura (1)
  - WEW Hardcore Tag Team Championship (1 time) – with YOSHIYA
  - WEW World Tag Team Championship (1 time) – with Takashi Sasaki
- Independent Wrestling Association Mid-South
  - IWA Mid-South Heavyweight Championship (1 time)
