= Hideki Hosaka =

Japanese professional wrestler (1971–2021)

Personal information
- Born: August 5, 1971 Itoigawa, Niigata, Japan
- Died: August 2, 2021 (aged 49)

Professional wrestling career
- Ring name(s): Hideki Hosaka; The Great Fake; Benkei; Mr. Pogo (II)
- Billed height: 1.80 m (5 ft 11 in)
- Billed weight: 110 kg (243 lb)
- Debut: August 7, 1991
- Retired: August 18, 2019

Hideki Hosaka (保坂 秀樹, Hosaka Hideki) (August 5, 1971 – August 2, 2021) was a Japanese professional wrestler, who is best known for his work in Frontier Martial-Arts Wrestling, All Japan Pro Wrestling, and Pro Wrestling Zero-One.

== Career ==
=== Early career (1991–1993) ===
An amateur wrestler in his scholastic years, he enrolled in Submission Arts Wrestling in May 1990. After over a year of training (including a dark match for Fighting Network RINGS in May 1991), he joined Wrestling International New Generations (W*ING) in August 1991. In W*ING he trained with wrestlers including The Great Wojo, TNT, and Mr. Pogo. In 1992, he left W*ING and joined the Takano Brothers' Pro Wrestling Crusaders, under the ring name Benkei. As PWC did not run regular shows, he transferred to Frontier Martial-Arts Wrestling (FMW) a year later.

=== Frontier Martial-Arts Wrestling (1993–2001) ===
Hosaka made his debut for FMW in 1993, siding with his W*ING friends Mr. Pogo and Mitsuhiro Matsunaga. He competed against Atsushi Onita in several street fights and deathmatches for well over a year. In February 1995 he won his first championship, the FMW Independent World Junior Heavyweight Championship, by defeating Ricky Fuji. He reigned as champion for two months, before losing the title to Koji Nakagawa. During his time in FMW, he also wrestled on various W*ING Reunion shows. In September 1997, the W*ING faction disbanded, due to W*ING Kanemura's loss to Onita, as Hosaka joined Onita and Kanemura to form a group called ZEN. In May 1998, he wrestled his first match for All Japan Pro Wrestling at their Tokyo Dome show. After ZEN disbanded in May 1998, he joined Onita's Team Zero, until Onita finally left the promotion in November 1998. That same month, he wrestled a match for BattlARTS. In 2000, he won three WEW Hardcore Tag Team Championships with Mammoth Sasaki, before leaving FMW in 2001 in an exodus that also included Masato Tanaka, Jado, Gedo, and Kaori Nakayama.

=== All Japan Pro Wrestling (2001–2006) ===
After wrestling a couple of W*ING Reunion shows in April 2001, Hosaka became a regular for Big Japan Pro Wrestling and All Japan Pro Wrestling before officially signing with AJPW in 2002. He underwent a five match trail series from April 27 to May 6, losing all matches. He was unable to make much progress in AJPW and began wrestling regularly for Pro Wrestling Zero-One where he had a more prominent role. By 2004, he was back wrestling solely for AJPW, but a major knee injury forced him out of action and he left AJPW.

=== Freelance (2006–2019) ===
After fully recovering from his knee injury, Hosaka returned to the ring as a freelancer in November 2006, which included stints in Wrestling Marvelous Future, Team Vader, and Ice Ribbon, before retiring from active competition in February 2008.

In 2010, Hosaka came out of retirement and returned to the ring as a freelancer, aligned with Atsushi Onita and Ichiro Yaguchi. The trio wrestled for multiple promotions including Zero1, Kaientai Dojo Pro Wrestling Freedoms and Pro Wrestling Noah. Hosaka held the Niigata Openweight Championship for three years from December 2013 to December 2016. He was a regular for the revived FMW known as "Chō Sentō Puroresu FMW" until the promotion stopped promoting events in early 2018. After the death of his mentor Mr. Pogo in June 2017, he wrestled a tour for the resurrected FMW as Mr. Pogo, as a tribute to his mentor.

He retired from wrestling in 2019.

== Political career ==
On October 16, 2016, Hosaka announced that he was running for the City Council for the Sodeguara District in Chiba.

== Illness and death ==
On October 21, 2019, Hosaka announced that in the month prior, he was diagnosed with Stage-IV colon and liver cancer. After nearly two years battling cancer, Hosaka died on August 2, 2021, just three days shy of his 50th birthday.

== Championships and accomplishments ==
- Frontier Martial-Arts Wrestling / World Entertainment Wrestling
  - FMW Independent World Junior Heavyweight Championship (1 time)
  - FMW World Street Fight 6-Man Tag Team Championship (2 times) - with Atsushi Onita and Masato Tanaka (1), and Atsushi Onita and Sean Guinness (1)
  - WEW Hardcore Tag Team Championship (3 times) – with Yoshinori/Mammoth Sasaki
- Niigata Pro Wrestling
  - Niigata Openweight Championship (1 time)
