= FMW 10th Anniversary Show =

1999 professional wrestling event

FMW 10th Anniversary Show: Entertainment Wrestling Special Live
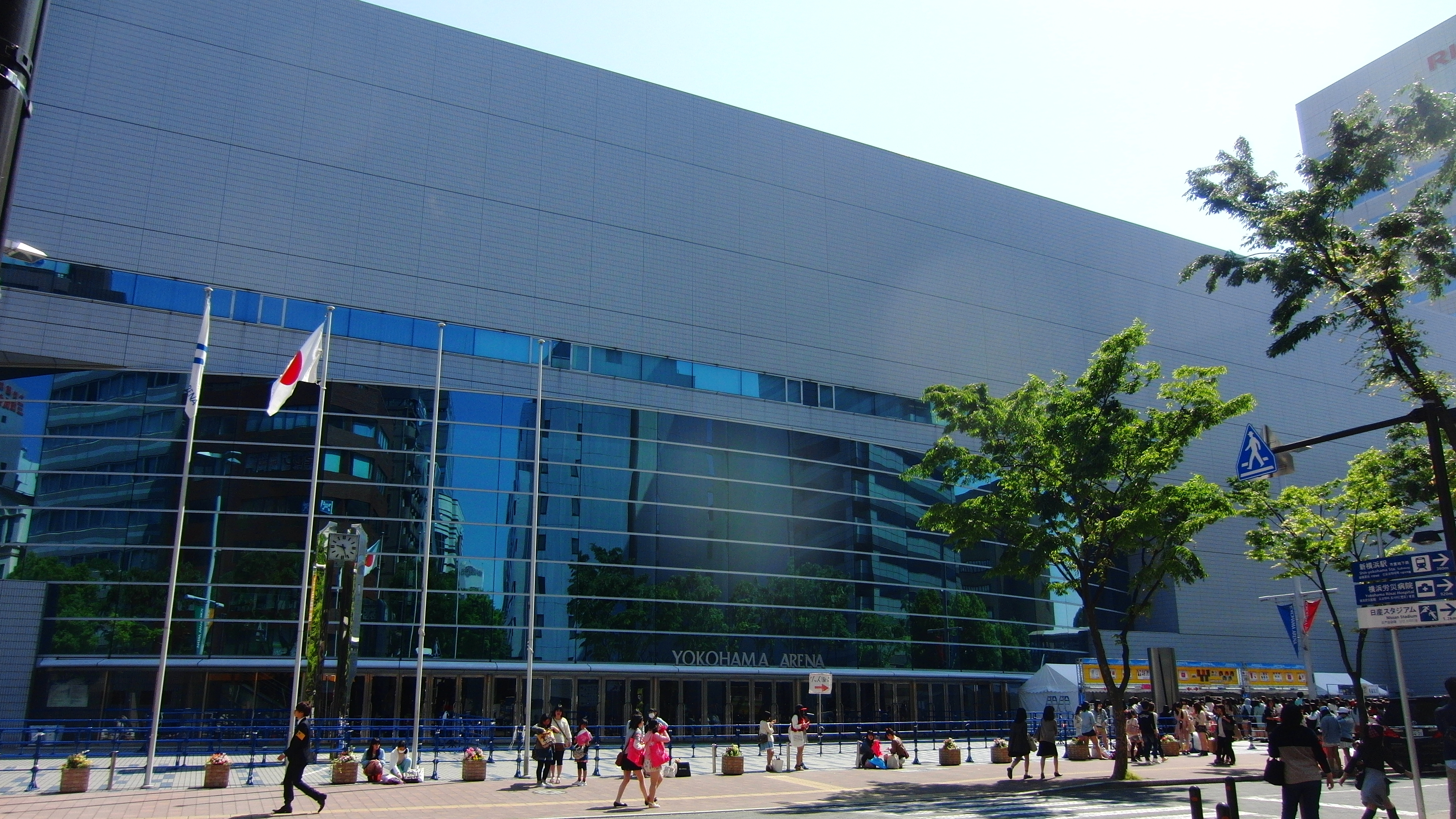
- Promotion: Frontier Martial-Arts Wrestling
- Date: November 23, 1999
- City: Yokohama, Japan
- Venue: Yokohama Arena
- Attendance: 11,000

Pay-per-view chronology
← Previous; Making of a New Legend IV: Day 7	Next → Making of a New Legend VI: Day 5

FMW Anniversary Show chronology
← Previous; 9th Anniversary	Next → 11th Anniversary

FMW 10th Anniversary Show: Entertainment Wrestling Special Live was a professional wrestling pay-per-view (PPV) event produced by Frontier Martial-Arts Wrestling (FMW). The event took place on November 23, 1999, at the Yokohama Arena in Yokohama, Japan. This was the tenth edition of the company's premier event Anniversary Show, commemorating the tenth anniversary of the company.

In the main event, H defeated "Hayabusa" (Mr. Gannosuke in disguise) with Shawn Michaels as the special guest referee (originally, it was supposed to be Dr. Death Steve Williams as the special guest referee, but allegedly due to his loyalty to Giant Baba and All Japan Pro Wrestling, Williams refused, which resulted in the WWF firing him and replacing him with Michaels). H and Gannosuke reconciled after the match and ended their rivalry for the first time in FMW and would enjoy a reign as WEW Tag Team Champions shortly after the event. In the event's other high-profile matches, Masato Tanaka defeated Kodo Fuyuki in a loser leaves FMW 13,000 volt electrical thunderbolt cage deathmatch to win the WEW Heavyweight Championship, forcing Fuyuki to leave FMW, Tetsuhiro Kuroda and Hisakatsu Oya retained the WEW Tag Team Championship against ECW World Tag Team Champions Raven and Tommy Dreamer and Kintaro Kanemura retained the WEW Hardcore Championship against Balls Mahoney.

The event is known in the United States as Judgment Day.

== Event ==
Other on-screen personnel
Role:	Name:
Commentary team	J-Taro Sugisaku
Commentary team	Takashi Saito
Commentary team	Jun Kusanagi

=== Preliminary matches ===
The event kicked off with a ladder match for the vacant WEW 6-Man Tag Team Championship, pitting Ricky Fuji, Flying Kid Ichihara and Chocoball Mukai against Koji Nakagawa, Jado and Gedo. Fuji grabbed the title belt from the top of the ladder after knocking Gedo off the ladder to win the titles.

Next, the team of Kaori Nakayama and Emi Motokawa took on Jazz, Malia Hosaka and Miss Mongol in a handicap match. Nakayama delivered a Diamond Dust to Jazz for the win.

Next, Hido took on Willie Williams in a Different Style Fight. Williams knocked out Hido in the second round after hitting a series of knee strikes and a hard kick for the win.

Next, The Funks (Dory Funk, Jr. and Terry Funk) took on Naohiko Yamazaki and Yoshinori Sasaki. Both Funks applied the spinning toe holds on Yamazaki and Sasaki and made them submit for the win.

Next, Kintaro Kanemura defended the WEW Hardcore Championship against Balls Mahoney. Kanemura and Mahoney brawled with each other throughout the backstage area until they returned to the ringside. Kanemura knocked Mahoney out with a sleeper hold and placed him on a table. Kanemura then climbed a scaffold and delivered a Baku Yama Special off the scaffold onto Mahoney on the table to retain the title.

Next, Tetsuhiro Kuroda and Hisakatsu Oya defended the WEW World Tag Team Championship against Raven and Tommy Dreamer. Kuroda avoided a Dreamer Driver by Dreamer and hit a lariat for the win to retain the titles.

It was followed by the penultimate match, a Loser Leaves FMW 13,000 Volt Electrical Thunderbolt Cage Deathmatch in which Kodo Fuyuki defended the WEW World Heavyweight Championship against Masato Tanaka. Tanaka delivered a Roaring Elbow to Fuyuki to win the title. After the match, Tanaka threw a stretchered Fuyuki into a garbage can.

=== Main event match ===
H took on Hayabusa in the main event, with Shawn Michaels serving as the special guest referee. Michaels tried to stop Hayabusa from hitting H with a steel chair in the tree of woe position. Hayabusa hit H with it and then hit Michaels with a chair as well, prompting Michaels to deliver a Sweet Chin Music to Hayabusa. Michaels tried to remove Hayabusa's mask but H prevented him from doing so. Hayabusa eventually tore off the mask himself to reveal his identity as Mr. Gannosuke. After a lengthy action, H finally knocked Gannosuke out with a H Thunder and a Phoenix Splash for the win. After the match, Michaels convinced Gannosuke to shake hands with H, who proceeded to shake hands with H and hug him, turning into a fan favorite in the process.

== Reception ==
The 10th Anniversary Show received mixed reviews from critics. Stuart of Puroresu Central wrote "This card was so/so, but the good outweighed the bad, or at least will be remembered more than the bad (which is essentially the same thing). From the Kanemura vs. Balls match onward, everything was decent (the ECW vs FMW tag was borderline) or better", and considered it a good way for Japanese wrestling to "get into the Japanese style without immediately dashing away from the dominant angle-driven style of the WWF and WCW" He appreciated the ladder match, calling it "a good way to start the show, because it was a hot, action-packed match with no resting" but also panned it for not being "the standard of many U.S. ladder matches, despite being fought in the same Americanized way" and gave mixed reviews to the Hardcore Championship match, praising Kanemura by stating "This match showed how good Kanemura can still be and was a walk in the park for him, because it was hardcore-lite compared to the old school FMW garbage stuff (exploding barbed wire, etc.)" but panned Mahoney's performance and the match itself. He gave mixed reaction to the Tag Team Championship match, in which he praised the defending champions and panned the challengers, with analyzing that the match was not "even that decent, but the champions and the novelty made it watchable". He gave positive reviews to Tanaka/Fuyuki match by stating that the match was "really damn good".

Ryan Byers of 411Mania wrote "Though this card wasn’t quite as bad as things would become, it certainly featured several key steps in that direction. As a result, instead of this show being pleasant nostalgia, it was an unfortunate reminder of how a once great company began its death spiral" He appreciated the Hardcore Championship match, with stating that "The two wrestlers paced the match well and the spots built in their intensity to the big finish, which is how you want a hardcore match to play out. In addition to that, I have to give them credit for coming up with some spots involving the car that I had never seen before and have not seen since. Heck, some of them were even safer than many extreme spots, since the automobile glass that they were using on one another is actually designed to break in such a way that it will do as little damage as possible to people. Though I’m at a point in my life during which I’m not going to advocate for any wrestlers slamming each other on hard metal objects or making risky twelve foot dives, if you accept the premise that this sort of match is going to be happening in the world, this was a damn fine example of it." He also praised the WEW World Heavyweight Championship match considering it "interesting" and rated it a 3 out of 4 stars.

== Results ==
No.	Results	Stipulations	Times
1	Ricky Fuji, Flying Kid Ichihara and Chocoball Mukai defeated Koji Nakagawa, Jado and Gedo	Ladder match for the vacant WEW 6-Man Tag Team Championship	14:54
2	Kaori Nakayama and Emi Motokawa defeated Jazz, Malia Hosaka and Miss Mongol	Handicap match	12:59
3	Willie Williams defeated Hido via knockout in the 2nd round	Different Style Fight	2:34
4	The Funks (Dory Funk, Jr. and Terry Funk) defeated Naohiko Yamazaki and Yoshinori Sasaki	Tag team match	15:13
5	Kintaro Kanemura (c) defeated Balls Mahoney	Singles match for the WEW Hardcore Championship	12:34
6	Tetsuhiro Kuroda and Hisakatsu Oya (c) defeated Raven and Tommy Dreamer	Tag team match for the WEW World Tag Team Championship	11:13
7	Masato Tanaka defeated Kodo Fuyuki (c)	Loser Leaves FMW 13,000 Volt Electrical Thunderbolt Cage Deathmatch for the WEW World Heavyweight Championship	16:14
8	H defeated "Hayabusa"	Singles match with Shawn Michaels as the special guest referee	18:21
(c) / – the champion(s) heading into the match
