= Ryuji Yamakawa =

Japanese retired professional wrestler (born 1970)

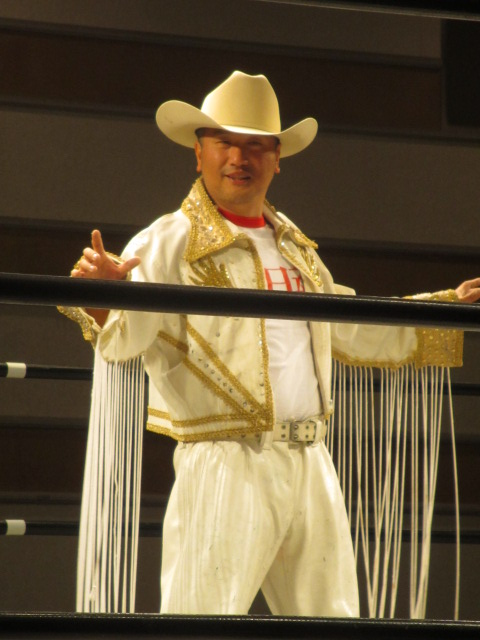
- Yamakawa in Feb 2018

Personal information
- Born: Seiji Yamakawa; April 2, 1970 (age 56) Teshikaga, Hokkaido, Japan

Professional wrestling career
- Ring name(s): Mr. Big Japan; Ryuji Yamakawa; Seiji Yamakawa
- Billed height: 5 ft 10 in (1.78 m)
- Billed weight: 198 lb (90 kg)
- Billed from: Kawakami, Hokkaido, Japan
- Trained by: Kazuo Sakurada; BJW Dojo
- Debut: October 25, 1994
- Retired: July 15, 2012

Seiji Yamakawa (山川 征二, Yamakawa Seiji; born 2 April 1970) is a Japanese retired professional wrestler, better known by his ring name Ryuji Yamakawa (山川 竜司, Yamakawa Ryūji). He is best known for his time with Big Japan Pro Wrestling (BJW), where he spent the majority of his career between 1995 and 2012 as a deathmatch wrestler. He was one of the top wrestlers and an over main eventer of the company, winning the Deathmatch Heavyweight Championship two times and the Tag Team Championship seven times.

== Professional wrestling career ==
=== Early career ===
Yamakawa was trained by Kazuo Sakurada and made his professional wrestling debut for Network of Wrestling (NOW) on October 25, 1994 in a loss to Poison Julie Sawada. He would lose to Ryo Miyake on October 26 and then suffered a second loss to Sawada on the promotion's last event on October 27. He then joined the newly founded Tokyo Pro Wrestling (TPW) at the company's debut show on December 7 by teaming with Ryo Miyake against Yoshihiro Tajiri and Fukaya in a tag team match, which the latter team won.

=== Big Japan Pro Wrestling ===
==== Early years (1995–1996) ====
Yamakawa debuted for the new deathmatch wrestling promotion Big Japan Pro Wrestling (BJW) at the company's first show Start Up on March 16, 1995 by teaming with Daisuke Taue against Kin Soppo and Nam Ti Ryon in a losing effort. Yamakawa picked the first win of his career by defeating Yuichi Taniguchi on June 2. Yamakawa became a mainstay of BJW by excelling the deathmatch wrestling style and competing in various deathmatches during the course of his career.

==== Championship reigns (1997–2001) ====
On July 23, 1997, Yamakawa and Yoshihiro Tajiri defeated Kishin Kawabata and Takashi Ishikawa to win the vacant Tag Team Championship. During this time, Yamakawa changed his ring name to Ryuji Yamakawa. They lost the title to Jado and Gedo at a Kodo Fuyuki-promoted Fuyuki Army event on December 22. Tamakawa and Tajiri defeated Jado and Gedo in a rematch to regain the title on January 2, 1998. They lost the title to Shadow Winger and Shadow WX on March 4. Yamakawa regained the title from Shadow Winger and Shadow WX with Shoji Nakamaki on August 9. Nakamaki left BJW on November 29, causing the title to be vacated. Yamakawa reached the pinnacle of his career by defeating Shadow WX in a no rope barbed wire death pallet coffin and fire deathmatch to win his first Deathmatch Heavyweight Championship, the top title in the promotion on May 30, 1999. Yamakawa became a double champion by teaming with Mike Samples to defeat Shadow WX and Tomoaki Honma for the Tag Team Championship on July 31. Yamakawa lost the Deathmatch Heavyweight Championship back to Shadow WX in a.no rope barbed wire fire deathmatch on August 10. On September 7, Yamakawa and Mike Samples lost the Tag Team Championship to the team of KAMIKAZE and Shunme Matsuzaki.

Yamakawa formed a tag team with Tomoaki Honma to participate in the 1999 Maximum Tag League, which they won by winning all of their matches in the tournament. On December 4, Yamakawa defeated Shadow WX in a four corners lighttubes board deathmatch to win his second Deathmatch Heavyweight Championship. Yamakawa lost the title to his tag team partner Honma in a 5-inch spike nail and barbed wire double board deathmatch in the quarter-final round of the 2000 BJ Grand Prix on January 2, 2000. On January 7, Yamakawa and Honma defeated KAMIKAZE and Shunme Matsuzaki to win the Tag Team Championship. Yamakawa would often represent BJW in wars with rival hardcore promotions Combat Zone Wrestling (CZW) and Frontier Martial-Arts Wrestling (FMW).

Yamakawa began feuding with FMW's Team No Respect group and the rivalry took place in both BJW and FMW. On February 22, Yamakawa defeated TNR member Kintaro Kanemura to win the WEW Hardcore Championship. Yamakawa debuted for FMW on April 11 as he, Tomoaki Honma and Winger unsuccessfully challenged TNR members Jado, Gedo and Koji Nakagawa for the WEW 6-Man Tag Team Championship. Yamakawa successfully defended the Hardcore Championship against Kanemura on April 24, before losing the title to Kanemura at the FMW 11th Anniversary Show. Yamakawa and Tomoaki Honma lost the BJW Tag Team Championship to CZW's John Zandig and Nick Gage on June 2. On July 2, Yamakawa teamed with former rival Shadow WX to defeat CZW's Justice Pain and The Wifebeater. They lost the title to Abdullah Kobayashi and KAMIKAZE on September 15.

Yamakawa reunited with Tomoaki Honma to win the 2000 Maximum Tag League for the second consecutive year. On February 23, 2001, Yamakawa teamed with Kintaro Kanemura at a FMW show and defeated GOEMON and Onryo to win the WEW Hardcore Tag Team Championship. They successfully defended the title against Azusa Kudo and Mammoth Sasaki on March 5. On March 18, Yamakawa participated in a tournament for the vacant BJW Deathmatch Heavyweight Championship, competing against Wifebeater in the quarter-final round. During the match, Yamakawa fractured his skull after Wifebeater delivered a Chokenstein and the injury put Yamakawa out of action for several months. He returned to action on December 2, where he teamed with Kintaro Kanemura to defend the Hardcore Tag Team Championship against the BJW Tag Team Champions Daisuke Sekimoto and Men's Teioh in a title vs. title match at a BJW show, with the BJW Tag Team Championship also being defended in the match. Sekimoto and Teioh won the match and both titles. Kanemura and Yamakawa unsuccessfully challenged Sekimoto and Teioh for the Hardcore Tag Team Championship in a rematch on January 2, 2002.

==== Mr. Big Japan (2002–2004) ====
Yamakawa reverted to competing under his real name Seiji Yamakawa and won the World Extreme Cup tournament later that year by defeating Kintaro Kanemura in the final at Harder Than Hardcore II. Yamakawa adopted the ring name Mr. Big Japan on July 21, 2003. On December 23, Mr. Big Japan and Men's Teioh defeated Badboy Hido and Ryuji Ito to win the Tag Team Championship, marking Yamakawa's record-setting seventh Tag Team Championship reign, a record for most reigns with the tag team title which would be broken by Daisuke Sekimoto, who won the title for an eighth time in 2017. They enjoyed a lengthy reign, losing the title to Abdullah Kobayashi and Jaki Numazawa on August 15, 2004. He took a hiatus from wrestling in September to recover from his injuries.

==== Part-time competition and retirement (2006–2012) ====
After two years away from the ring, Yamakawa returned to BJW at Katsura Special 4 on September 23, 2006 by teaming with Kintaro Kanemura against Shadow WX and Tetsuhiro Kuroda in his recovery match, which Yamakawa and Kanemura lost. He wrestled one more match on October 29, which he lost and then went on a hiatus again. His multiple injuries forced him to give up full-time wrestling and he became a part-timer in 2008. On August 19, 2009, Yamakawa teamed with Shadow WX, Jaki Numazawa and Abdullah Kobayashi as "Deathmatch Champions" and participated in an Eight-Man Tag Team Tournament, making to the final round, where they lost to Strong BJ (Daisuke Sekimoto, Yoshihito Sasaki, Shinya Ishikawa and Yuji Okabayashi). During the tournament, Yamakawa participated in his first deathmatch since 2002, as Deathmatch Champions defeated Deathmatch Young Bloods (Masashi Takeda, Isami Kodaka, Kankuro Hoshino and Mototsugu Shimizu) in a Tokyo Tower vs. Sapporo Television Tower Double Fluorescent Lighttubes match. On November 22, 2011, Yamakawa announced that he would retire on July 15, 2012 and worked his retirement tour throughout the late 2011 and the first half of 2012. He wrestled the first BJW match of 2012 by teaming with Yuichi Taniguchi to defeat Atsushi Ohashi and Masato Inaba. On July 25, Yamakawa competed in his retirement match at Ryuji Yamakawa Retirement The Final, in which he teamed with Abdullah Kobayashi and Ryuji Ito to defeat Jaki Numazawa, Shadow WX and Kankuro Hoshino in a Fluorescent Lighttubes and Nail Board Death Match when Yamakawa pinned Hoshino after a Reverse Tiger Driver.

== Championships and accomplishments ==
- Big Japan Pro Wrestling
  - BJW Deathmatch Heavyweight Championship (2 times)
  - BJW Tag Team Championship (7 times) – with Yoshihiro Tajiri (2), Shoji Nakamaki (1), Mike Samples (1), Tomoaki Honma (1), Shadow WX (1) and Men's Teioh (1)
  - WEW Hardcore Championship (1 time)
  - WEW Hardcore Tag Team Championship (1 time) – with Kintaro Kanemura
  - Maximum Tag League (1999, 2000) – with Tomoaki Honma
  - World Extreme Cup (2002)
