= FMW 12th Anniversary Show =

Wrestling event

FMW 12th Anniversary Show: Kawasaki Legend 2001
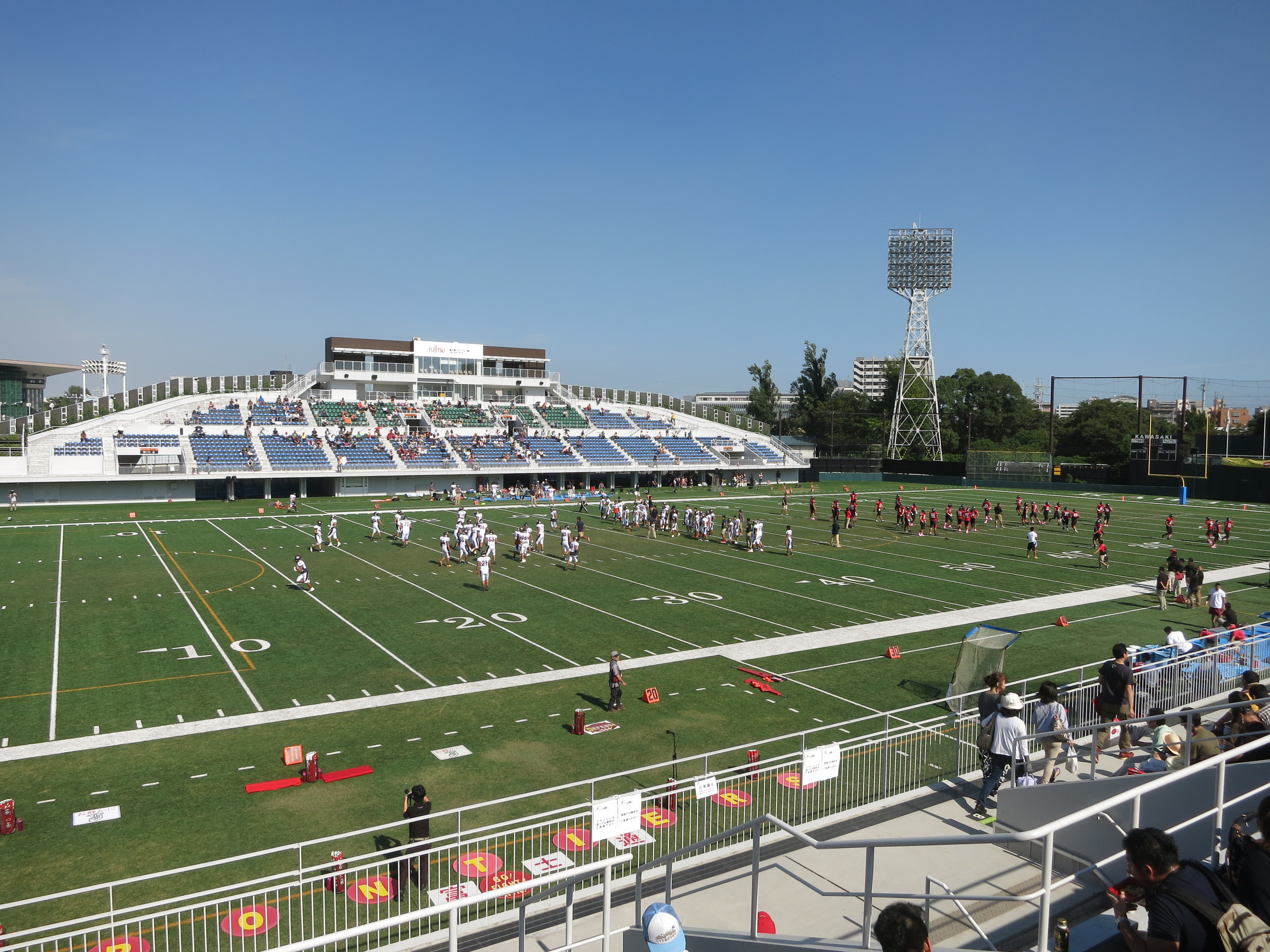
- Kawasaki Stadium
- Promotion: Frontier Martial-Arts Wrestling
- Date: May 5, 2001
- City: Kawasaki, Kanagawa, Japan
- Venue: Kawasaki Stadium
- Attendance: 10,500

Pay-per-view chronology
| ← Previous; Fighting Creation 2001: Day 3 | Next → Neo 2001: Day 1 |

FMW Anniversary Show chronology
| ← Previous; 11th Anniversary | Next → Last |

FMW 12th Anniversary Show: Kawasaki Legend 2001 was a professional wrestling pay-per-view (PPV) event produced by Frontier Martial-Arts Wrestling (FMW). The event took place on May 5, 2001 at Kawasaki Stadium in Kawasaki, Kanagawa, Japan. The event marked the return of FMW to the Kawasaki Stadium since Fall Spectacular in 1997. The event commemorated the twelfth anniversary of the promotion and was the final edition of the Anniversary Show as the promotion closed on February 15, 2002.

In the main event, Tetsuhiro Kuroda and Mr. Gannosuke took on Hayabusa and The Great Sasuke in an exploding 15000 volt thunderbolt octagon cage electric bomb deathmatch, which Hayabusa won by pinning Gannosuke. In another important match of the event, Genichiro Tenryu of WAR defeated Kodo Fuyuki.

== Background ==
=== Production ===
On March 13, 2001, FMW held a pay-per-view event at Korakuen Hall which was headlined by a match between Tetsuhiro Kuroda and Kintaro Kanemura. The event was a failure as it drew a crowd of only 2,000 people and FMW started preparing for its 12th Anniversary Show, which marked FMW's return to the historic Kawasaki Stadium after 1997's Fall Spectacular. The event was conducted in the parking lot of the Kawasaki Stadium.

=== Storylines ===
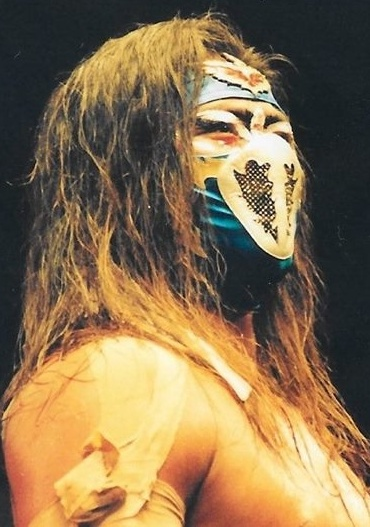
Hayabusa made his return to FMW after six months in the main event of 12th Anniversary Show.

At Deep Throat, Tetsuhiro Kuroda defeated Mr. Gannosuke in a match which stipulated that Gannosuke must retire if he lost. Later that night, Kodo Fuyuki defeated Hayabusa to retain the WEW World Heavyweight Championship and then announced that he was taking time off due to injury and would return to FMW at 12th Anniversary Show on May 5, 2001. Tetshiro Kuroda turned heel by attacking Hayabusa and proclaiming himself the new ace of FMW. On November 28, Kuroda turned on his tag team partner Masato Tanaka during a three-way match against Jado and Gedo and the team of Kodo Fuyuki and Kintaro Kanemura, which led to a six-man tag team match pitting Fuyuki, Kanemura and Kuroda against Tanaka, Jado and Gedo, which Kuroda's team won. This led Masato Tanaka to form Complete Players with Jado and Gedo. On December 20, Fuyuki, Kanemura and Kuroda defeated Complete Players in a barbed wire match and Kuroda confronted Hayabusa after the match at ringside and Hayabusa marched to confront Kuroda but Mr. Gannosuke held him back. On January 7, 2001, Kuroda established himself as FMW's top heel when he turned on Kodo Fuyuki during a title defense of the WEW World Tag Team Championship against Masato Tanaka and Gedo on January 7, 2001. Kuroda then formed Team Kuroda with a bunch of FMW's mid-card villains. On February 6, Kuroda called out Hayabusa for a confrontation after his match and then goaded him into getting attacked by The Masked Sumo, who hit a chair on Hayabusa's injured arms until The Great Sasuke returned to FMW to make the save. On February 23, Kodo Fuyuki and The Great Sasuke defeated Kuroda and Mammoth Sasaki when Sasuke pinned Kuroda, setting up a Naked Man Deathmatch between the two on March 5, which Kuroda won. On March 13, Mr. Gannosuke helped Kuroda defeat Kintaro Kanemura to become the #1 contender for the WEW World Heavyweight Championship. On April 1, Kuroda defeated Kodo Fuyuki, with Gannosuke's help, to win the WEW World Heavyweight Championship and then Gannosuke joined Team Kuroda. Shortly after, it was announced that Kuroda and Gannosuke would take on Hayabusa and The Great Sasuke in Hayabusa's return match, an Exploding 15000 Volt Thunderbolt Octagon Cage Bomb Deathmatch at the 12th Anniversary Show. On April 15, Kuroda, Gannosuke and Mammoth Sasaki defeated GOEMON, Onryo and The Great Sasuke in a match and then Hayabusa tried to make the rescue for Sasuke but got attacked and then Gannosuke ripped off Sasuke's match and wore it to mock Hayabusa and Sasuke.

On April 1, Mammoth Sasaki defeated Kintaro Kanemura to win the WEW Hardcore Championship, setting up a rematch between the two for the title at 12th Anniversary Show.

Kodo Fuyuki had beaten FMW owner Atsushi Onita at 9th Anniversary Show on April 30, 1998 in a match stemming from their legitimate rivalry over the backstage influence in FMW, which ultimately led to Onita's departure from FMW on November 20. Fuyuki planned on reviving the rivalry and setting up a rematch between the two at 12th Anniversary Show but talks with Onita fell down and Genichiro Tenryu was roped in to replace Onita and return to FMW as a WAR representative and face Fuyuki in a match at 12th Anniversary Show to resolve the feud between Tenryu and Fuyuki which had begun in the WAR promotion during the mid-1990s.

== Event ==
=== Preliminary matches ===
In the opening match, Ricky Fuji and Satoru Makita took on Tomokazu Morita and Yoshihito Sasaki. In the end, Fuji executed a Kamikaze and a DDT to Sasaki for the win. After the match, Morita tried to attack Fuji but Fuji countered by hitting him with a DDT.

Next, Shinjuku Shark took on the mixed martial artist Tarec Pasca. In the end, Shark hit a moonsault for the win.

Next, the team of Flying Kid Ichihara, Hisakatsu Oya, Survival Tobita and Tomomi Tanimoto took on Azusa Kudo, Kaoruko Arai, Naohiko Yamazaki and Saitama Gorilla in an eight-person tag team match. Oya hit an enzuigiri and two consecutive backdrop suplexes to Yamazaki, allowing Tanimoto to pin Yamazaki for the win.

Next, Ricky Banderas defended the IWA World Heavyweight Championship against Chocoball Mukai. In the end, Banderas hit a brainbuster and a diving crossbody on Mukai to win the match and retain the title.

Next, the team of Emi Motokawa and Kyoko Inoue took on Ayako Hamada and AKINO. In the end, Hamada hit a Hama-chan Cutter to Motokawa for the win.

In the following match, Mammoth Sasaki defended the WEW Hardcore Championship against Kintaro Kanemura. In the end, Kanemura hit a German suplex, a Baku Yama Special and a double underhook powerbomb to Sasaki to win the title.

Later, GOEMON and Onryo defended the WEW World Tag Team Championship against the team of Super Crazy and Super Nova. In the end, GOEMON delivered a diving senton to Nova to retain the titles.

In the penultimate match, Kodo Fuyuki took on Genichiro Tenryu in a match in which Ashura Hara served as the special guest referee for the match. In the end, Tenryu hit a series of lariats to Fuyuki for the win.

=== Main event match ===
The main event was an Exploding 15000 Volt Thunderbolt Octagon Cage Bomb Deathmatch pitting the WEW World Heavyweight Champion Tetsuhiro Kuroda and Mr. Gannosuke against Hayabusa and The Great Sasuke. In the end, Hayabusa hit a H Thunder to Gannosuke for the win.

== Reception ==
The event received negative reviews from Stuart of Puroresu Central, who considered it a "disappointing show". He compared it to be better than the previous year's event. He appreciated the AKINO/Hamada vs. Motokawa/Inoue joshi tag team match as the best match of the show while criticized Tenryu/Fuyuki and the main event for not living "up to their potential", with "For a regular FMW PPV, where you have to lower the standards, this show would have been good, but this was their big event."

The show drew a crowd of 10,500, the biggest crowd for the company since 1997's Fall Spectacular due to its return to Kawasaki Stadium as they were holding their shows at smaller venues where they could not draw much crowds.

== Results ==
| No. | Results | Stipulations | Times |
|---|---|---|---|
| 1 | Ricky Fuji and Makita defeated Morita and Yoshihito Sasaki | Tag team match | 4:59 |
| 2 | Shinjuku Shark defeated Tarek Pasca | Singles match | 4:47 |
| 3 | Flying Kid Ichihara, Hisakatsu Oya, Survival Tobita and Tomomi Tanimoto defeated Azusa Kudo, Kaoruko Arai, Naohiko Yamazaki and Saitama Gorilla | Intergender tag team match | 5:18 |
| 4 | Ricky Banderas (c) defeated Chocoball Mukai | Singles match for the IWA World Heavyweight Championship | 7:59 |
| 5 | AKINO and Ayako Hamada defeated Emi Motokawa and Kyoko Inoue | Tag team match | 7:51 |
| 6 | Kintaro Kanemura defeated Mammoth Sasaki (c) | Singles match for the WEW Hardcore Championship | 7:57 |
| 7 | GOEMON and Onryo defeated Super Crazy and Super Nova | Tag team match for the vacant WEW World Tag Team Championship | 11:38 |
| 8 | Genichiro Tenryu (with Koki Kitahara and Nobukazu Hirai) defeated Kodo Fuyuki | Singles match with Ashura Hara as the special guest referee | 13:33 |
| 9 | Hayabusa and The Great Sasuke defeated Tetsuhiro Kuroda and Mr. Gannosuke | Exploding 15000 Volt Thunderbolt Octagon Cage Bomb Deathmatch | 20:07 |
(c) / – the champion(s) heading into the match
