= Ricky Fuji =

Japanese professional wrestler

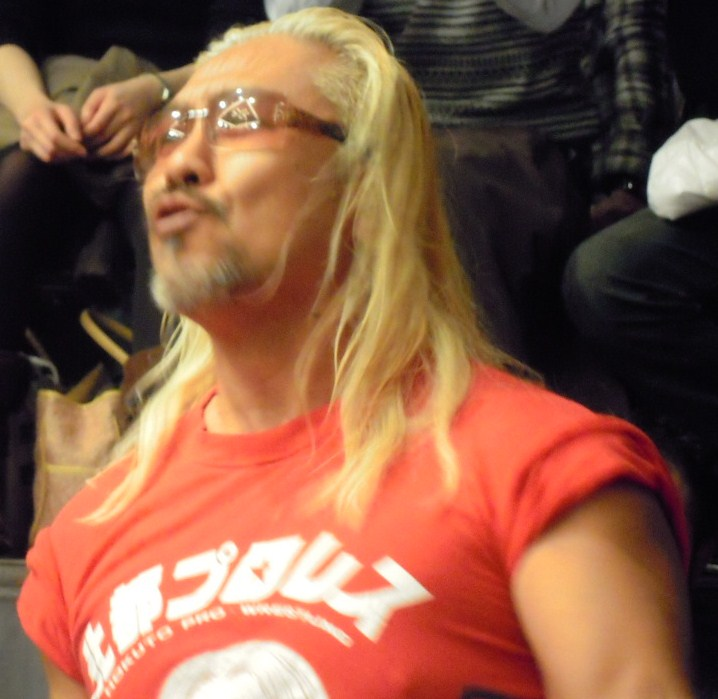
- Fuji in 2010

Personal information
- Born: Masanori Morimura; September 27, 1965 (age 60) Chiba, Japan

Professional wrestling career
- Ring name(s): Ricky Fuji; Black Tomcat; Calgary Tiger
- Billed height: 1.73 m (5 ft 8 in)
- Billed weight: 96 kg (212 lb)
- Billed from: Calgary, Alberta, Canada
- Trained by: NJPW Dojo; Mr. Hito; Stu Hart
- Debut: June 28, 1988

Masanori Morimura (森村 方則, Morimura Masanori) (born September 27, 1965) better known under his ring name Ricky Fuji (リッキー・フジ, Rikkī Fuji) is a Japanese professional wrestler currently signed to Action Advance Pro Wrestling, where he also runs the day-to-day operations. He is perhaps best known for his time with Frontier Martial-Arts Wrestling (FMW), where he wrestled between the promotion's early days in 1990 until the promotion's closure in 2002, making him the longest-tenured wrestler in the company's history.

Fuji initially joined FMW as a mid-carder, who initially teamed and feuded with the promotion's founder Atsushi Onita on several occasions. He was a part of many groups including Team Canada and Lethal Weapon during the mid-1990s while also achieving success in the company's junior heavyweight division, winning the AWA World Light Heavyweight Championship and the Independent World Junior Heavyweight Championship once each.

== Professional wrestling career ==
=== Training ===
Masanori Morimura started training in the NJPW Dojo in 1984, but left the dojo because he was "young and dumb". While at the NJPW Dojo, he wanted to be a UWF fighter instead. When he failed to join UWF, he realized he ruined his chances at beginning his career in Japan. He then left Japan in January 1987 for a training expedition in Canada, where he was trained in the Dungeon by Stu Hart and his right-hand man, Mr. Hito. During his time training in Calgary, he would befriend other Japanese stars like Hiroshi Hase and his former NJPW Dojo mates Keiichi Yamada and Shinya Hashimoto.

=== Debut delayed ===
In March 1987, he was set to debut as Hase's new partner in the Viet Cong Express, due to his original partner, Fumihiro Niikura, leaving the territory and taking a hiatus, due to a heart attack in December 1986. However, a twist of bad luck befallen Morimura, as just days before his official debut, he suffered a cerebral hemorrhage and was hospitalized; his role in the Viet Cong Express was taken over by Shinji Sasazaki. Morimura would fully recover and by August 1987, he would resume his training in the Dungeon.

=== Canada (1988–1990) ===
On June 28, 1988, Morimura made his professional wrestling debut in Stampede Wrestling against Hart's son, Ross, under the name Tiger Mask (not the same as Satoru Sayama), at a show in Kamloops, British Columbia, Canada. After a couple of matches, he evolved into Black Tomcat. In August 1988, Black Tomcat was one of many wrestlers cut from Stampede, and joined the North Western Wrestling Federation and later won the promotion's Junior Heavyweight Championship, his first title, after defeating Steve Gillespie.

In March 1989, Black Tomcat left the NWWF for the Canadian Independent Wrestling Federation, ran by Les Thornton. After losing a loser leaves town match to Kid Chaos in June 1989, he unmasked and started wrestling under the ring name Ricky Fuji and adopted a rock star gimmick. During his time in the CIWF, he was scouted by the World Wrestling Federation after Bruce Hart introduced him to his brother Bret, but no deal was ever finalized, as they didn't know how to bring him in. Later that year, he would become the promotion's final Junior Heavyweight Champion, before the promotion folded by the end of 1989. In January 1990, Fuji returned to Japan and trained with former NJPW star Masanobu Kurisu and was offered a spot in the upstart promotion Frontier Martial-Arts Wrestling by Atsushi Onita, which he accepted.

=== Frontier Martial-Arts Wrestling ===
==== Debut (1990) ====
Upon debuting for FMW in May 1990, Fuji quickly became over with the fans, particularly among female fans, due to his Shawn Michaels-inspired gimmick and promo skills. He debuted for FMW by defeating The Shooter on May 12, 1990. He quickly established himself as an arrogant villain and entered a rivalry with FMW owner Atsushi Onita, as Fuji and Masanobu Kurisu lost to the team of Onita and Tarzan Goto in a match, a day later on May 13, marking Fuji competing in a FMW main event, just in his second match with the company. On June 2, Fuji competed in his first deathmatch, a stretcher street fight against Tarzan Goto, which Fuji lost. On June 6, Fuji received his first title shot in FMW as he unsuccessfully challenged Lee Gak Soo for the AWA World Light Heavyweight Championship. Tarzan Goto would soon enter a feud with Onita and Fuji formed an alliance with Onita's rivals Tarzan Goto and Mr. Pogo in the summer of 1990. On July 22, Fuji participated in a thirteen-man battle royal, which took place in a ring placed in the Miyazaki Nichinan Sea. Fuji went on to win the battle royal by last eliminating Kim Hyun Hwan.

At Summer Spectacular, Fuji was paired with Mr. Pogo and Katsuji Ueda as the trio defeated Kim Hyun Han, Lee Gak Soo and Sambo Asako in a six-man tag team match. Fuji received another shot against Lee Gak Soo for the World Light Heavyweight Championship on August 18 but failed to win the title. On August 20, Fuji and Pogo lost a street fight to Atsushi Onita and Sambo Asako, after which Fuji turned into a fan favorite for the first time in his career as he teamed with Onita on the following day against Pogo and Gran Mendoza in a losing effort. In September, Fuji entered a tournament for the vacant World Light Heavyweight Championship, defeating Jang Yong Wow in the quarter-final before losing to eventual winner Katsuji Ueda in the semi-final. On October 26, Fuji participated in Japan's first intergender tag team match, teaming with Megumi Kudo in a loss to Tarzan Goto and his wife Despina Montagas. At the promotion's 1st Anniversary Show in November, Fuji teamed with Akihito Ichihara against The Shooter and Billy Mack in a losing effort.

==== World Light Heavyweight Champion and teaming with Sambo Asako (1991–1992) ====
In January 1991, Fuji teamed with Tarzan Goto to participate in a tag team tournament, in which the team qualified for the knockout stage by scoring three points in the round-robin stage. They were eliminated from the knockout stage by losing to Atsushi Onita and Sambo Asako in the quarter-final on January 15. He continued to team with Goto and Onita to wrestle Mr. Pogo and his allies in several matches. On May 29, Fuji was booked to win his first title in FMW by defeating Jimmy Backlund to capture the World Light Heavyweight Championship. He began feuding with Mark Starr after successfully defending the title against Starr in his first title defense on June 21. On August 17, Fuji entered the Barbed Wire Deathmatch Tournament, in which he defeated Starr in the quarter-final round before losing to eventual winner Atsushi Onita via forfeit in the semi-final. Fuji dropped the World Light Heavyweight Championship to Starr on August 24.

At the 2nd Anniversary Show in September, Fuji was paired with Sambo Asako against Big Titan and The Gladiator in a street fight, which Fuji's team lost. In the fall of 1991, Fuji and Asako participated in the World's Strongest Tag Team Tournament for the newly created WWA World Martial Arts Tag Team Championship. They qualified for the play-off by scoring seven points in the round-robin stage and lost to the eventual winners Atsushi Onita and Tarzan Goto in the play-off. At 3rd Anniversary Show, Fuji teamed with Sambo Asako and The Great Punk against Big Titan, The Gladiator and Horace Boulder in a stretcher street fight in a losing effort.

==== Team Canada (1993–1994) ====
On January 12, 1993, Ricky Fuji turned on his teammates The Great Punk, Mr. Gannosuke and Tarzan Goto in an elimination tag team match against the team of Big Titan, Dr. Luther, The Gladiator and The Sheik, which led to Fuji turning into a villain. He formed a faction with Titan, Luther and Gladiator called Team Canada, based on Fuji's own time in Canada in the past. Sheik would eventually depart the group to form an alliance with Atsushi Onita. Team Canada quickly became FMW's top villainous group and feuded with the likes of Onita, Tarzan Goto, Mr. Gannosuke, The Sheik and Sabu among others.

At 4th Anniversary Show, Fuji teamed with his Team Canada stablemates Big Titan and The Gladiator, defeating Katsuji Ueda, The Great Punk and Tarzan Goto in a Captain's Fall Losing Captain Leaves Town No Rope Barbed Wire Tornado Street Fight Deathmatch. Fuji then defeated Mercurio in his next major match at Summer Spectacular. In September, Fuji entered a tournament for the new Independent World Junior Heavyweight Championship, in which he lost to Atsushi Onita, Jr. in the opening round. At Year End Spectacular, the team of Fuji, Titan and Gladiator defeated Sambo Asako, Katsuji Ueda and Grigory Verichev in a street fight.

In early 1994, Fuji participated in a tournament for the new Brass Knuckles Tag Team Championship, in which he was paired with Terry Simms, losing to Jinsei Shinzaki and Masaru Toi in a barbed wire street fight in the first round, leading to Fuji and Simms being demoted to Loser's Block B, where they ended up losing to Hideki Hosaka and Hisakatsu Oya in a barbed wire deathmatch. In April, Fuji entered the inaugural Super J-Cup tournament, where he defeated Negro Casas in the first round, but lost to Jushin Thunder Liger in the quarter-final round. The following month, in May, Fuji teamed with his Team Canada stablemates Big Titan and The Gladiator to take on WAR's Fuyuki-Gun (Hiromichi Fuyuki, Jado and Gedo) in an interpromotional six-man tag team match at 5th Anniversary Show. During the match, a miscommunication took place between Titan and Gladiator. Gladiator won the match for his team but then abandoned Fuji and Titan after the match.

Fuji toured a few events for Michinoku Pro Wrestling (MPW) in June, where he won the vacant Canadian Rocky Mountain Wrestling's (CRMW) North American Mid-Heavyweight Championship by defeating Terry Boy on June 16. Fuji then returned to FMW, defeating Mach Hayato at Summer Spectacular. Shortly after, Team Canada disbanded after the departure of Big Titan from FMW in December.

==== Independent World Junior Heavyweight Champion and Lethal Weapon (1994–1996) ====
On December 20, 1994, Fuji defeated The Great Sasuke to win the Independent World Junior Heavyweight Championship. He successfully defended the title against Battle Ranger Z in his first title defense on January 6, 1995. He lost the title to Hideki Hosaka in his second title defense on February 6. Soon after the title loss, Fuji formed a new faction called Lethal Weapon with Tarzan Goto and Hisakatsu Oya, although Goto would soon after leave FMW in April 1995.

At 6th Anniversary Show, Fuji and Oya defeated Mr. Pogo and Yukihiro Kanemura of the W*ING Alliance to capture the Brass Knuckles Tag Team Championship and their tag team was named Love Guns, Lethal Weapon's resident tag team. Following the departure of Tarzan Goto, Fuji and Oya would later recruit The Gladiator, Mr. Pogo and Horace Boulder into Lethal Weapon. The group would briefly takeover W*ING Alliance as the top villainous faction in FMW. Fuji and Oya lost the Brass Knuckles Tag Team Championship four months later to Daisuke Ikeda and Yoshiaki Fujiwara on September 5. During the fall of 1995, Lethal Weapon began transitioning into fan favorites after W*ING Alliance betrayed both FMW and Lethal Weapon during a tag team match. Lethal Weapon would then side with FMW to feud with W*ING. Fuji headlined December's Year End Spectacular event by teaming with Super Delfin and Taka Michinoku against the team of Hayabusa, The Great Sasuke and Koji Nakagawa in a losing effort.

Fuji participated in the first WarGames match in FMW history on February 23, 1996, by teaming with Masato Tanaka and Tetsuhiro Kuroda to defeat W*ING Alliance members Hido, W*ING Kanemura and Mitsuhiro Matsunaga, thus ending the feud of FMW and Lethal Weapon against W*ING. The match was followed by the debut of the new group Puerto Rican Army, which took over as FMW's new villainous group by luring away several key members of W*ING and Lethal Weapon. At 7th Anniversary Show, Fuji teamed with The Rock 'n' Roll Express (Ricky Morton and Robert Gibson) to defeat the team of Crypt Keeper, Boogie Man and Freddy Krueger. On July 31, Fuji, Oya and Gladiator unsuccessfully challenged Koji Nakagawa, Masato Tanaka and Tetsuhiro Kuroda for the World Street Fight 6-Man Tag Team Championship. On September 15, Fuji's tag team partners Horace Boulder and The Gladiator turned on Fuji after the trio lost a match to Hideki Hosaka, Hido and Taka Michinoku. The entire Lethal Weapon group turned on Fuji to join Puerto Rican Army, thus forcing Lethal Weapon to disband.

==== Various rivalries (1997–2002) ====
Following Lethal Weapon's disbandment, Fuji aligned himself with Hayabusa and began competing as a mid-card wrestler on the FMW side, often assisting him in his rivalries with Mr. Gannosuke and Kodo Fuyuki. Fuji competed in the opening match of the 8th Anniversary Show, teaming with Ricky Morton to defeat Hido and Dragon Winger. At Shiodome Legend, Fuji successfully defended the CRMW North American Middleweight Championship against Hayato Nanjyo. He lost the title to Gedo on August 31. At Fall Spectacular, Fuji participated in a twelve-man Royal Rumble match, where he lasted until the final two when he was eliminated by Tetsuhiro Kuroda. His success dwindled in FMW and was relegated to mid-card matches. He balanced competing in singles, tag team, and six-man tag team matches.

On January 7, 1998, Fuji wrestled a special match under the ring name Morimura on a ZEN-produced show, defeating Sunao Gosaku and El Pandita in a three-way dance. Fuji competed at FMW's first pay-per-view event 9th Anniversary Show, where he teamed with John Kronus in a loss to Jado and Gedo on April 30. On August 15, he resurrected his masked Black Tomcat persona from his days in Canada, for one night only on a Michinoku Pro Wrestling card, in which he lost to Super Delfin. Later that year, he joined Hayabusa's Team Phoenix to feud with Team No Respect. In the fall of 1998, Fuji participated in an Over the Top Tournament to determine the #1 contender for the FMW Double Championship (the unified Brass Knuckles Heavyweight Championship and the Independent Heavyweight Championship), where he lost to Masao Orihara in the opening round at ECW/FMW Supershow I.

On May 5, 1999, Fuji took on Minoru Tanaka in a match for the vacant Independent World Junior Heavyweight Championship, which Tanaka won. In the summer of 1999, Fuji began feuding with the FMW President Shoichi Arai after Arai turned on FMW to join Team No Respect, leading to a match between the two at Haunted House, which Arai won after Giant Steele made his FMW debut and attacked Fuji. Fuji would eventually gain revenge by teaming with Masato Tanaka to defeat Kodo Fuyuki and Shoichi Arai at Hayabusa Graduation Ceremony on August 23. At the Last Match pay-per-view on August 25, Fuji teamed with Naohiko Yamazaki in a loss to Super Leather and Chris Youngblood.

At 10th Anniversary Show on November 23, Fuji teamed with Chocoball Mukai and Flying Kid Ichihara to defeat Team No Respect members Koji Nakagawa, Jado and Gedo in a ladder match to win the vacant WEW 6-Man Tag Team Championship. They lost the title to Nakagawa, Jado and Gedo on December 11, ending their reign at eighteen days. In April 2000, Fuji entered the 2000 Super J-Cup, where he defeated Sasuke the Great in the first round, but lost to Gran Hamada in the quarterfinals. The following month, Fuji defeated Crazy Boy in the opening match of the 11th Anniversary Show. Later that year, Fuji gained a victory over former tag team partner Chocoball Mukai in the opening match of the Deep Throat pay-per-view.

At 12th Anniversary Show, Fuji teamed with Makita to defeat Morita and Yoshihito Sasaki in a tag team match. On May 22, 2001, Fuji reunited with former Lethal Weapon member Hisakatsu Oya and Flying Kid Ichihara to defeat Azusa Kudo, Shinjuku Shark and Naohiko Yamazaki for the vacant WEW 6-Man Tag Team Championship, winning the title for a second time. They held the title for two months until losing to Kodo Fuyuki, Mr. Gannosuke and Kintaro Kanemura on July 30. On February 3, 2002, Fuji wrestled his last FMW match, in which he teamed with Shinjuku Shark against GOEMON and Hisakatsu Oya in a losing effort. A day later, on February 4, FMW held its last event and Shoichi Arai closed the company due to bankruptcy on February 15.

=== Freelance (2002–2012) ===
Since FMW's closing, Fuji has been wrestling as a freelancer for various Japanese independent promotions, including Wrestling Marvelous Future, Apache Pro-Wrestling, and FREEDOMS.

On September 17, 2011, Fuji teamed with Bambi and Yuji Hino to win the Chiba Six Man Tag Team Championship after defeating Little Galaxy (Hiro Tonai, Shiori Asahi and Yuki Sato). The championship is Fuji's first in a major promotion since May 2001. On October 2, Fuji, Bambi and Hino were successful in their first title defense after defeating Daigoro Kashiwa, Marines Mask II and Tigers Mask.

=== Kaientai Dojo/Action Advance Pro Wrestling (2012–present) ===
On January 4, 2012, Kaientai Dojo confirmed that they signed Ricky Fuji for one year; he has remained with the promotion ever since.

On February 5, 2012, Fuji had a chance to win the Independent World Junior Heavyweight Championship at a Freedoms show against Hiroki, but failed. After the match, he got on the microphone and announced his goal of winning the belt by the end of the year, after looking at the "FMW" letters still engraved on the belt.

On January 26, 2013, after nearly a year after his announced his intentions, Fuji finally won the Independent World Junior Heavyweight title from Hiroki, ending his nearly 15-month reign. He would hold onto the title for nearly four months, before losing the title to Nanjyo Hayato. On June 16, Fuji and Daigoro Kashiwa defeated Hiroki and Yuji Hino to win the vacant Strongest-K Tag Team Championship. They lost the title to Kazma Sakamoto and Kengo Mashimo on September 16.

Upon Taka Michinoku's departure and the renaming of the company to Action-Advance Pro Wrestling (2AW) in 2019, Fuji was chosen to run the day-to-day operations, as well as being in the active roster. In January 2020, Fuji announced that 2AW is now the Japanese affiliate for Allied Independent Wrestling Federations.

=== Return to FMW (2015–present) ===
On March 4, 2015, it was confirmed by Flying Kid Ichihara and Choden Senshi Battle Ranger that Ricky Fuji is confirmed as one of the seven FMW originals to rejoin FMW. On April 21, 2015, Fuji defeated Battle Ranger in the opening match of the promotion's first show in 13 years.

== Personal life ==
Outside of wrestling, Fuji runs his own gym in Chiba called Endo's Gym, and also plays in two rock bands, Crazy Crew (which includes The Great Sasuke and Ken45°) and The Heavyweighters.

On September 7, 2022, Fuji collapsed at his home in Chiba. He was taken to a nearby hospital, where it was revealed that he had suffered a stroke. He underwent a successful cerebral angiography, placing a cerebrovascular catheter in his brain. Fuji's condition is stable, but the left side of his body is currently paralyzed. He has since made a speedy recovery and was released from the hospital on November 29.

== Championships and accomplishments ==
- Canadian Independent Wrestling Federation

- CIWF Junior Heavyweight Championship (1 time, last champion)

- Canadian Rocky Mountain Wrestling

- CRMW North American Mid-Heavyweight Championship (2 times)

- DDT Pro-Wrestling

- Greater China Unified Zhongyuan Tag Team Championship (1 time) – with The Great Sasuke

- Frontier Martial-Arts Wrestling / World Entertainment Wrestling

- AWA World Light Heavyweight Championship (1 time)
- FMW Brass Knuckles Tag Team Championship (1 time) – with Hisakatsu Oya
- FMW Independent World Junior Heavyweight Championship (2 times)
- WEW 6-Man Tag Team Championship (2 times) – with Flying Kid Ichihara and Chocoball Mukai (1) and Flying Kid Ichihara and Hisakatsu Oya

- Kaientai Dojo

- Chiba Six Man Tag Team Championship (1 time) – with Bambi and Yuji Hino
- Independent World Junior Heavyweight Championship (1 time)
- Strongest-K Tag Team Championship (1 time) - with Daigoro Kashiwa
- WEW Hardcore Tag Team Championship (1 time) - with Nasu Banderas

- NMC Pro/Pro Wrestling Nightmare

- NMC Wrestle Brain Junior Heavyweight Championship (1 time)

- North Western Wrestling Federation

- NWWF Junior Heavyweight Championship (1 time)
