= FMW 11th Anniversary Show =

FMW 11th Anniversary Show: Backdraft
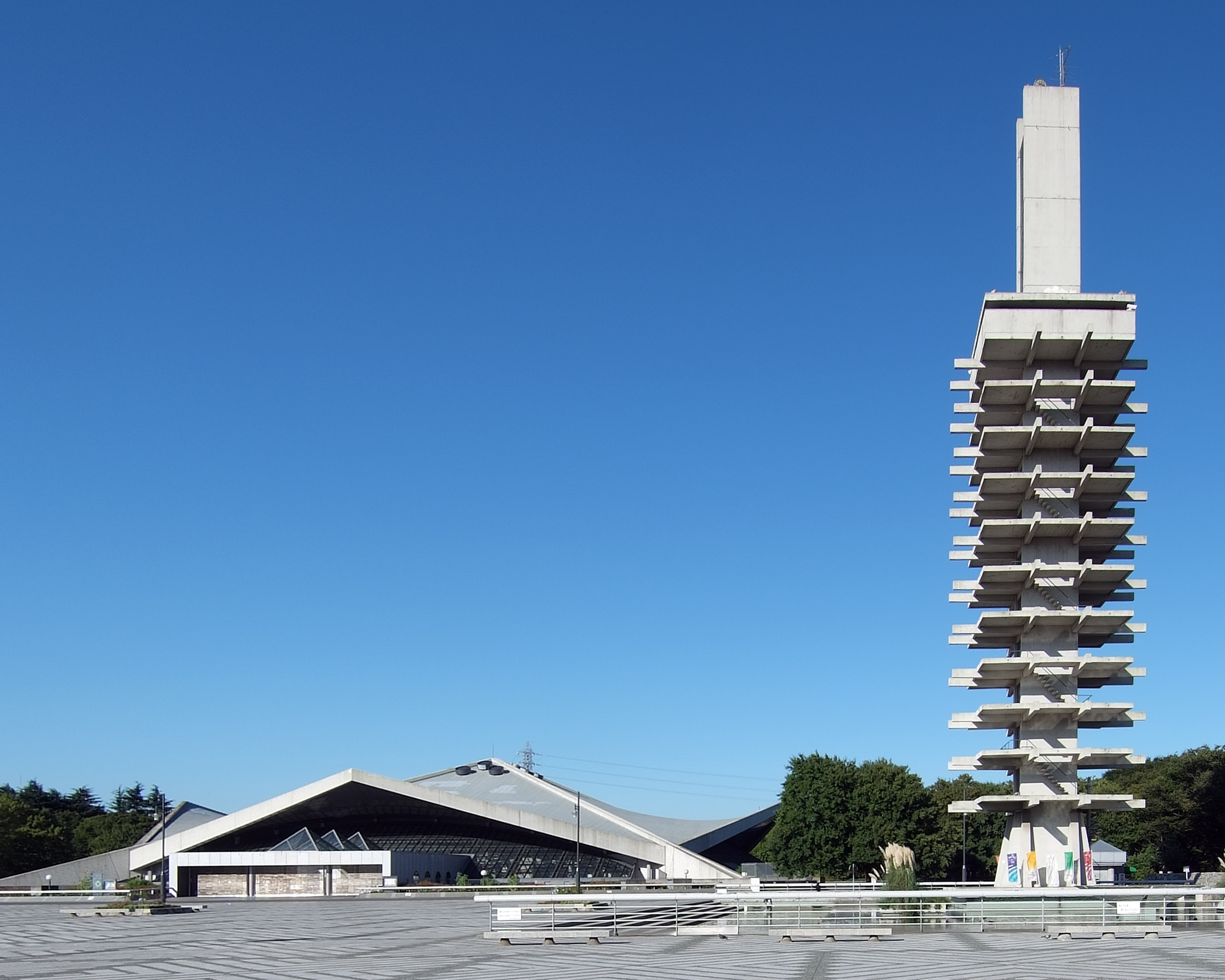
- Promotion: Frontier Martial-Arts Wrestling
- Date: May 5, 2000
- City: Tokyo, Japan
- Venue: Komazawa Gymnasium
- Attendance: 4,200

Pay-per-view chronology
← Previous; Winning Road 2000: Day 11	Next → Neo FMW 2000: Day 14

FMW Anniversary Show chronology
← Previous; 10th Anniversary	Next → 12th Anniversary

FMW 11th Anniversary Show: Backdraft was a professional wrestling pay-per-view (PPV) event produced by Frontier Martial-Arts Wrestling (FMW). The event took place on May 5, 2000 at Komazawa Gymnasium in Tokyo, Japan. The event commemorated the eleventh anniversary of FMW.

In the main event, Hayabusa defeated ECW Japan member Masato Tanaka. Another important match on the card featured Tetsuhiro Kuroda defend the WEW World Heavyweight Championship against Kodo Fuyuki, with Fuyuki defeating Kuroda to win the title. Originally, the main event was planned to be Mr. Gannosuke and H against Masato Tanaka and The Gladiator, as part of the ECW-FMW talent exchange. However, The Gladiator (who was also the ECW World Heavyweight Champion) left ECW for WCW in April 2000 due to Paul Heyman owing him money, which killed off the relationship between ECW and FMW.

== Reception ==
Stuart of Puroresu Central felt that the 11th Anniversary Show "didn't live up to the hype and anticipation it had. A couple of very good matches and a perfectly watchable one didn't make it too bad but much of the undercard stuff was dreadful. Fuyuki's booking has dragged the FMW product down so far."

== Results ==
No.	Results	Stipulations	Times
1	Ricky Fuji defeated Crazy Boy	Singles match	8:03
2	Yoshinori Sasaki and Hideki Hosaka (c) defeated The Samoans (Matty Smalls and Eddie Fatu)	Tag team match for the WEW Hardcore Tag Team Championship	13:44
3	Kaoruko Arai defeated Jun Kasanagi	Singles match with Flying Kid Ichihara as special guest referee	2:35
4	Kaori Nakayama, Chocoball Mukai and Kyoko Inoue defeated Yuka Nakamura, Azusa Kudo and Emi Motokawa	Intergender tag team match	12:26
5	Kintaro Kanemura defeated Ryuji Yamakawa (c)	Singles match for the WEW Hardcore Championship	16:36
6	Gedo, Jado and Koji Nakagawa (c) defeated Willie Williams, Willie Takayama, Bouzu and Megane	Six-man tag team match for the WEW 6-Man Tag Team Championship	8:28
7	Sabu vs. Mr. Gannosuke ended in a no contest	Singles match	10:55
8	Kodo Fuyuki defeated Tetsuhiro Kuroda (c)	Singles match for the WEW World Heavyweight Championship	18:09
9	Hayabusa defeated Masato Tanaka	Singles match	18:43
(c) / – the champion(s) heading into the match
