= WEW World Tag Team Championship =

Professional wrestling tag team championship

Details
- Promotion: FMW (1999–2002); WEW (2002–2003); Apache Army (2005–2016); A-Team (2017–present)
- Date established: June 16, 1999
- Current champions: Iori and Kosaku Tonosaki
- Date won: June 22, 2025
Statistics
- First champions: Team No Respect (Koji Nakagawa and Gedo)
- Most reigns: Individual: Tetsuhiro Kuroda and Tomohiko Hashimoto (10 reigns each); Team: Kintaro Kanemura and Tetsuhiro Kuroda (3 reigns)

The WEW (World Entertainment Wrestling) World Tag Team Championship is a tag team professional wrestling championship formerly contested in the Japanese promotions Frontier Martial-Arts Wrestling, World Entertainment Wrestling and Apache Pro-Wrestling Army, and currently contested in A-Team. The title is sometimes called the FMW/WEW World Tag Team Championship.

== Title history ==
No:	Wrestler:	Reigns:	Date:	Days held:	Location:	Event:	Notes:
Frontier Martial-Arts Wrestling
1	Team No Respect (Koji Nakagawa and Gedo)	1	June 16, 1999	53	Chiba, Japan	Making of a New Legend tour	Nakagawa and Gedo defeated Masato Tanaka and Tetsuhiro Kuroda for the FMW Brass Knuckles Tag Team Championship on June 13, 1999. The title was replaced by the new WEW World Tag Team Championship on June 16.
2	Tetsuhiro Kuroda and Hisakatsu Oya	1	August 8, 1999	115	Tokyo, Japan	FMW	
3	Mr. Gannosuke and H	1	December 1, 1999	86	Osaka, Japan	Making of a New Legend VI tour	
4	Kyoko Inoue and Kodo Fuyuki	1	February 25, 2000	36	Tokyo, Japan	Cluster Battle tour	Kyoko Inoue was the first female to hold the title.
5	Team No Respect (Koji Nakagawa and Gedo)	2	April 1, 2000	57	Winning Road tour	Yokosuka, Japan	
—	Vacated	—	May 28, 2000	—	Tokyo, Japan	Neo FMW tour	The title was vacated after Koji Nakagawa turned on his partners during a WEW 6-Man Tag Team Championship defense against Kodo Fuyuki, Kyoko Inoue and Chocoball Mukai.
6	Jado and Gedo (3)	1	July 14, 2000	14	Takamatsu, Japan	King of Fight II tour	Defeat H and Tetsuhiro Kuroda to win the vacant titles.
7	Masao Inoue and Yoshinobu Kanemaru	1	July 28, 2000	25	Tokyo, Japan	King of Fight II tour	
8	Tamon Honda and Naomichi Marufuji	1	August 22, 2000	123	Tokyo, Japan	One Night Navigation	Title change occurs in Pro Wrestling Noah.
9	Shin Fuyuki-Gun (Kodo Fuyuki (2) and Tetsuhiro Kuroda (2))	1	December 23, 2000	15	Tokyo, Japan	Grand Voyage	Title change occurs in Pro Wrestling Noah. Aired on tape delay on
10	Complete Players (Masato Tanaka and Gedo (4))	1	January 7, 2001	45	Tokyo, Japan	New Year Generation tour	
—	Vacated	—	February 21, 2001	—	—	—	The title was vacated due to Masato Tanaka and Gedo leaving FMW.
11	GOEMON (3) and Onryo	1	May 5, 2001	123	Kawasaki, Japan	12th Anniversary Show: Kawasaki Legend	Defeated Nova and Super Crazy to win the vacant titles. GOEMON formerly held the title as Koji Nakagawa.
12	Mr. Gannosuke (2) and Mammoth Sasaki	1	September 5, 2001	34	Sapporo, Japan	Super Dynamism tour	
13	Hayabusa (2) and Tetsuhiro Kuroda (3)	1	October 9, 2001	27	Tokyo, Japan	Power Splash tour	
—	Vacated	—	November 5, 2001	—	Tokyo, Japan	Scramble Survivor tour	The title was vacated after Hayabusa suffered a career-ending injury against Mammoth Sasaki on October 22, 2001.
14	Mr. Gannosuke (3) and Mammoth Sasaki (2)	2	November 23, 2001	<1	Yokohama, Japan	Scramble Survivor tour	Defeated Biomonster DNA and Dr. Luther to win the vacant titles.
—	Vacated	—	November 23, 2001	—	Yokohama, Japan	Scramble Survivor tour	Mr. Gannosuke and Mammoth Sasaki split up to vacate the titles.
15	Tetsuhiro Kuroda (4) and Mr. Gannosuke (4)	1	December 21, 2001	16	Tokyo, Japan	FMW	Kuroda and Gannosuke defeated Kintaro Kanemura and Mammoth Sasaki in a tournament to win the vacant titles.
—	Vacated	—	January 6, 2002	—	Tokyo, Japan	FMW	The titles were vacated after Mr. Gannosuke suffered an injury.
16	Kodo Fuyuki (3) and The Sandman	1	February 4, 2002	11	Tokyo, Japan	FMW	Fuyuki and Sandman defeated Sabu and Tetsuhiro Kuroda to win the vacant titles.
—	Vacated	—	February 15, 2002	—	—	—	The titles were retired after FMW closed.
World Entertainment Wrestling
17	Takashi Sasaki and GENTARO	1	August 23, 2002	200	Tokyo, Japan	WEW	Defeat Taka Michinoku and Hi69 to revive the titles in WEW.
18	Kintaro Kanemura and Tetsuhiro Kuroda (5)	1	March 11, 2003	51	Tokyo, Japan	WEW	
—	Retired	—	May 1, 2003	—	—	—	The title was retired after WEW closed.
Apache Army
19	Tetsuhiro Kuroda (6) and Onryo (2)	1	March 12, 2005	(Note: The exact date when Onryo and Tetsuhiro Kuroda vacated the title is unknown.)	Chiba, Japan	Kintaro Kanemura Festival	Defeat Takashi Sasaki and Gentaro to revive the titles in Apache Army. Titles are later vacated.
20	Takashi Sasaki (2) and BADBOY Hido	1	August 6, 2006	49	Tokyo, Japan	Apache Pro	Defeated Tetsuhiro Kuroda and Jun Kasai in a tournament final for the vacant titles.
21	Jun Kasai and Tomoaki Honma	1	September 24, 2006	149	Tokyo, Japan	Apache Pro 3rd Anniversary Show	
—	Vacated	—	February 20, 2007	—	—	—	The titles were vacated when the team split up.
22	Jun Kasai (2) and Jaki Numazawa	1	June 24, 2007	91	Tokyo, Japan	Form of Challenge	Defeated Gentaro and The W*INGer for the vacant titles.
23	Gentaro (2) and The W*INGer	1	September 23, 2007	207	Tokyo, Japan	Apache Pro	
24	Nosawa and Mazada	1	April 17, 2008	388	Tokyo, Japan	Tetsuhiro Kuroda Festival	
—	Vacated	—	May 10, 2009	—	Mie, Japan	XWF	The titles were vacated after May 10, 2009.
25	Kohei Sato and Kamikaze	1	September 6, 2009	711	Osaka, Japan	Wrestler's	Kohei Sato and KAMIKAZE defeated Magnitude Kishiwada and Koichiro Kimura for the vacant title. The title change took place in Pro Wrestling Zero1.
26	Kintaro Kanemura (2) and Tetsuhiro Kuroda (7)	2	August 18, 2011	41	Tokyo, Japan	Apache Pro	
27	Hiroki and Yusaku Obata	1	September 28, 2011	179	Tokyo, Japan	Apache Pro	
28	Manjimaru and Takeshi Minamino	1	March 25, 2012	32	Tokyo, Japan	Apache Pro	
29	Daisaku Shimoda and Kazushi Miyamoto	1	April 26, 2012	35	Tokyo, Japan	Apache Pro	
30	Kengo Nishimura and Tomohiko Hashimoto	1	May 31, 2012	113	Tokyo, Japan	Apache Pro	
31	Kotaro Nasu and Masato Shibata	1	September 21, 2012	22	Tokyo, Japan	Apache Pro	
32	Shoichi Ichimiya and Tomohiko Hashimoto (2)	1	October 13, 2012	274	Tokyo, Japan	Apache Pro	
33	Daisaku Shimoda (2) and Rikiya Fudo	1	July 14, 2013	119	Osaka, Japan	Apache Pro	
34	Tadasuke and Tomohiko Hashimoto (3)	1	November 10, 2013	301	Osaka, Japan	Apache Pro	
35	Ryoji Sai and Tetsuhiro Kuroda (8)	1	September 7, 2014	266	Osaka, Japan	Apache Pro	
36	Kazushi Miyamoto (2) and Tomohiko Hashimoto (4)	1	May 31, 2015	245	Tokyo, Japan	Apache Pro	
37	Mikami and Rion Mizuki	1	January 31, 2016	105	Tokyo, Japan	Apache Pro	This was a four-way Tables, Ladders, and Chairs match, also involving Chikara and Kintaro Kanemura, and Hi69 and Passion Hasegawa.
38	Hi69 (2) and HASEGAWA	1	May 15, 2016	105	Tokyo, Japan	Apache Pro	Hi69 formerly held the title as Hiroki.
39	Kintaro Kanemura (3) and Tetsuhiro Kuroda (9)	3	August 28, 2016	35	Tokyo, Japan	Apache Pro	
40	Tomohiko Hashimoto (5) and Keisuke Okuda	1	October 2, 2016	84	Tokyo, Japan	Kintaro Kanemura Retirement Tour - Day 1	
41	Tatsuhito Takaiwa and Tetsuhiro Kuroda (10)	1	December 25, 2016	112	Tokyo, Japan	Final Gong	Apache promotion closed after the event and moved to A-Team.
A-Team
42	Masashi Takeda and Tomohiko Hashimoto (6)	1	April 16, 2017	117	Tokyo, Japan	Take Off	
43	Daisaku Shimoda (3) and Blue Shark	1	August 11, 2017	57	Tokyo, Japan	A-Team	
44	Daisuke Ikeda and HASEGAWA (2)	1	October 7, 2017	246	Yokohama, Japan	A-Team	
45	Tomohiko Hashimoto (7) and Nobutaka Moribe	1	June 10, 2018	1	Tokyo, Japan	A-Team	
—	Vacated	—	June 11, 2018	—	—	—	The titles were vacated after June 11, 2018.
46	Akira Jo and Raiden	1	December 23, 2018	119	Tokyo, Japan	WEW Tag Team Title League	Defeat Daisaku Shimoda and Takumi Sakurai in the final of the WEW Tag Team Title League.
47	Daisuke Ikeda (2) and Keiichi Sato	1	April 21, 2019	161	Tokyo, Japan	A-Team 2nd Anniversary	
48	Gajo and Tomohiko Hashimoto (8)	1	September 29, 2019	161	Tokyo, Japan	A-Team	
49	Gentaro (3) and Nobutaka Moribe (2)	1	March 8, 2020	147	Tokyo, Japan	A-Team	
50	Brian Ishizaka and Takumi Sakurai	1	August 2, 2020	35	Tokyo, Japan	A-Team	
51	Mikami (2) and HASEGAWA (3)	1	September 6, 2020	252	Tokyo, Japan	A-Team	
52	Raiden (2) and Joji Otani	1	May 16, 2021	81	Tokyo, Japan	A-Team	
—	Vacated	—	August 5, 2021	—	—	—	The titles were vacated after August 5, 2021.
53	Daisaku Shimoda (4) and Iori	1	August 22, 2021	35	Tokyo, Japan	A-Team	Defeat Raiden and Hashinosuke for the vacant titles.
54	Gajo (2) and Tomohiko Hashimoto (9)	2	September 26, 2021	1,846	Tokyo, Japan	A-Team	
—	Vacated	—	March 22, 2022	—	—	—	The titles were vacated after March 22, 2022.
55	Raiden (3) and Takumi Sakurai (2)	1	March 27, 2022	56	Tokyo, Japan	A-Team	Defeat Tomohiko Hashimoto and Daisaku Shimoda for the vacant titles.
56	Iori (2) and Masahiro Sase	1	May 22, 2022	70	Tokyo, Japan	A-Team	
57	Daisaku Shimoda (5) and Kosaku Tonosaki	1	July 31, 2022	119	Tokyo, Japan	A-Team	
58	Tomohiko Hashimoto (10) and Super Tiger II	1	November 27, 2022	462	Tokyo, Japan	A-Team	
59	HASEGAWA (4) and Dylan James	1	March 3, 2024	301	Tokyo, Japan	A-Team	Defeat Super Tiger II & Takahiro Tababa, substituting for Tomohiko Hashimoto who double-booked himself in a six-man tag team match earlier in the card.
60	Kota Nagashima and Super Tiger II (2)	1	December 29, 2024	175	Urayasu, Japan	A-Team	
61	Iori (3) and Kosaku Tonosaki (2)	1	June 22, 2025	481+	Tokyo, Japan	A-Team	

== See also ==
- WEW Heavyweight Championship
- FMW Brass Knuckles Tag Team Championship, predecessor.
