= Mammoth Sasaki =

Japanese rikishi and professional wrestler

Yoshinori Sasaki
- 佐々木嘉則
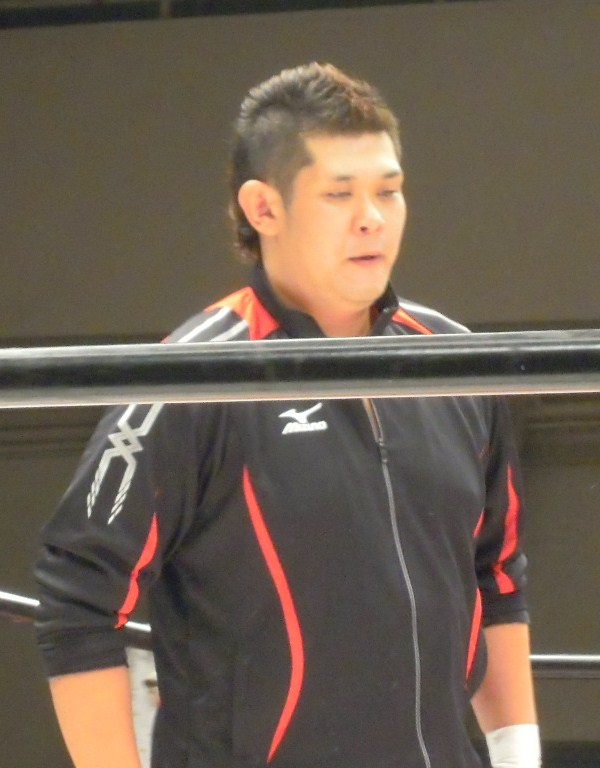
- Sasaki in August 2010
- Born: July 23, 1974 (age 52); Osaka, Japan
- Professional wrestling career
- Ring names: Mammoth Sasaki; Yoshinori Sasaki
- Billed height: 188 cm (6 ft 2 in)
- Billed weight: 125 kg (276 lb)
- Trained by: Katsutoshi Niiyama
- Debut: November 15, 1997
- Martial arts career
- Nationality: Japanese
- Height: 6 ft (1.8 m)
- Weight: 275 lb (125 kg; 19.6 st)
- Style: Shoot wrestling, Professional wrestling
- Teacher: Katsutoshi Niiyama
- Years active: 1993–1996 (Sumo wrestling); 1997–present (Professional wrestling); 2002 (MMA)

Other information
- Mixed martial arts record from Sherdog

Yoshinori Sasaki (佐々木 嘉則, Sasaki Yoshinori; born 23 July 1974) is a Japanese professional wrestler and retired sumo wrestler and mixed martial artist, currently working for Pro Wrestling Freedoms under the ring name Mammoth Sasaki (マンモス佐々木, Manmosu Sasaki), where he is a former King of Freedom Tag Team Champion, becoming the longest reigning champion during his second reign with the title. He is best known for his time with Frontier Martial-Arts Wrestling (FMW), where he competed between 1997 until the promotion's closure in 2002.

After training at the FMW Dojo, Sasaki made his debut in December 1997 under his given name and competed as an enhancement talent through the early years of his career. His first push came when he became a member of Atsushi Onita's faction Team Zero in 1998. After years on the low-card, Sasaki won his first title, the WEW Hardcore Tag Team Championship with Hideki Hosaka in 2000 and changed his ring name to Mammoth Sasaki in the fall of the year and became a main eventer during the fall of 2001.

== Sumo career ==
Naniwa Yoshinori
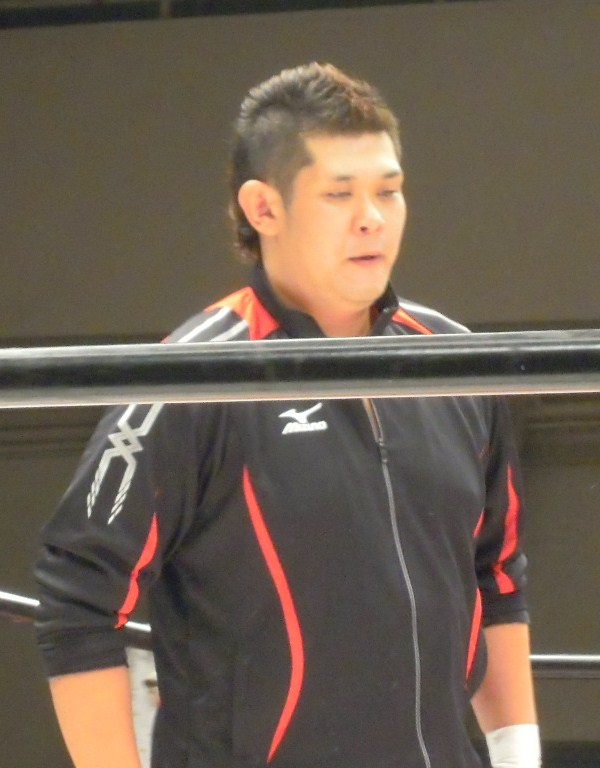

Personal information
- Native name: 浪速 嘉則
- Born: Yoshinori Sasaki; 23 July 1974 (age 52) Osaka, Japan
- Height: 1.84 m (6 ft 1/2 in)
- Weight: 118.5 kg (261 lb)

Sport
- Sport: Sumo
- Retired: November, 1996
- Heya: Azumazeki
- Record: 57-52-31
- Debut: January, 1993
- Highest rank: Sandanme 98 (January, 1995)
- Updated on March 2023

Sasaki was a third-rank junior champion of sumo wrestling in his high school and began training to compete for a professional sumo career in 1990. He made his sumo debut in January 1993 under the ring name (shikona) Wakasasaki (若佐々木) and rose to the rank of sandanme in 1995. In March, he changed his name to Naniwa (浪速). Later that year, he injured his right ligament and retired from sumo in November 1996 to train for a professional wrestling career. His overall career record of sumo was 57–52–31.

== Professional wrestling career ==
=== Frontier Martial-Arts Wrestling ===
==== Training and debut (1997–1998) ====
Sasaki began training for a professional wrestling career at the Frontier Martial-Arts Wrestling (FMW) dojo in April 1997, where he was trained by Katsutoshi Niiyama. Sasaki earned the nickname of "Mammoth" by his peers due to his size and strength. Sasaki made his wrestling debut by defeating Nobuyaso Anesaki in an exhibition match on November 15, 1997. Sasaki debuted in FMW on December 8 by losing to Koji Nakagawa. Sasaki began teaming with his dojo teammate Naohiko Yamazaki by losing to Mr. Pogo #2 and Flying Kid Ichihara on February 6, 1998 and got the first win of his FMW career against Yamazaki on February 9. Sasaki was used as an enhancement talent, being used to put over the established stars of FMW during the early matches of his career. On May 19, Sasaki made his pay-per-view debut by teaming with Yamazaki in a loss to Ichihara and Pogo.

==== Team Zero and low-card (1998–1999) ====
On July 10, Sasaki and Pogo #2 were present with FMW President Shoichi Arai when Arai made the decision to move FMW to sports entertainment. Team No Respect leader Kodo Fuyuki attacked the trio to begin Sasaki's first program in FMW. At Atsushi Onita Presents Liar, Liar, Sasaki competed in the first main event of his career by teaming with Atsushi Onita, Pogo #2 and Arai against Fuyuki, Yukihiro Kanemura, Koji Nakagawa and Go Ito in a weapon deathmatch in a winning effort to retain Arai's presidency and release Tetsuhiro Kuroda and Hideki Hosaka from TNR's slavery. On August 21, Sasaki became a founding member of Onita's Team Zero faction, with Pogo #2, Kuroda and Hosaka. Team Zero feuded with TNR during the fall of 1998 before the group disbanded when Onita quit FMW on November 20.

On January 5, 1999, Hideki Hosaka turned on Sasaki and Gosaku Goshogawara during a match against Nanjyo Hayato, Flying Kid Ichihara, and Naohiko Yamazaki, causing Sasaki to lose the match. Sasaki faced Hosaka to gain revenge on March 29, but lost the match. Sasaki resumed teaming with Yamazaki and continued to compete as a jobber to the stars throughout 1999. He received his first championship match at Goodbye Hayabusa II: Last Match, by teaming with Tetsuhiro Kuroda and Hisakatsu Oya against Kodo Fuyuki, Koji Nakagawa and Gedo for the WEW 6-Man Tag Team Championship in a losing effort. On September 24, Sasaki participated in his first pay-per-view main event by teaming with H, Tetsuhiro Kuroda and Flying Kid Ichihara to defeat "Hayabusa", Koji Nakagawa, Gedo and Chocoball Mukai. Sasaki and Yamazaki would lose to Terry Funk and Dory Funk, Jr. at the 10th Anniversary Show in their first high-profile match.

==== Hardcore Tag Team Champion and Team Kuroda (2000–2001) ====
Sasaki and Yamazaki teamed with Hideki Hosaka against Team No Respect's Koji Nakagawa, Jado and Gedo in a losing effort on January 5, 2000. As a result, Sasaki began teaming with Hosaka as the duo competed against Nakagawa and Gedo, Jado and Kintaro Kanemura and Hisakatsu Oya and Naohiko Yamazaki in a #1 contender's four corners elimination match for the WEW World Tag Team Championship. On March 27, Sasaki, Yamazaki and H unsuccessfully challenged Team No Respect for the 6-Man Tag Team Championship. At Night in Shibuya Backdraft Eve, Sasaki won the first title of his career as he and Hosaka defeated Kintaro Kanemura and Hido to become the inaugural WEW Hardcore Tag Team Champions. They successfully defended the title against The Samoans (Matty Smalls and Fatu) in their first title defense at 11th Anniversary Show. After retaining the title in their second title defense against Michael Shane and Reuben Cruise on May 28, Sasaki and Hosaka became villains by turning on H and Tetsuhiro Kuroda to join Kodo Fuyuki in his new Shin Fuyuki-gun group. On June 21, Sasaki and Hosaka lost the Hardcore Tag Team Championship to Samoans. After failing in a rematch on July 14, Hosaka and Sasaki regained the title by defeating Samoans on July 28. They successfully defended the title against Jado and Gedo on August 28.

On September 15, Sasaki's ring name was changed to his former FMW dojo name "Mammoth Sasaki" to avoid confusion with newcomer Yoshihito Sasaki. Sasaki competed in a series of three matches titled Mammoth Sasaki Renaming Commemoration Trial Series, losing all of the matches against Masato Tanaka, Hayabusa and Tetsuhiro Kuroda. On September 21, Sasaki and Hosaka lost the Hardcore Tag Team Championship to Jado and Gedo in a three-way match, also involving Kintaro Kanemura and Ryuji Yamakawa. At Deep Throat, Sasaki and Hosaka defeated Xtreme Pro Wrestling's Supreme and Homeless Jimmy to win their third Hardcore Tag Team Championship. Sasaki unsuccessfully challenged Kintaro Kanemura for the WEW Hardcore Championship on November 19 in his first singles championship match. They successfully defended the title against Pogo the Clown and Supreme on November 28, before dropping the title to GOEMON and Onryo on January 7, 2001 after Hosaka turned on Sasaki by performing a Powerbomb. Hosaka left FMW before a rivalry could develop between Hosaka and Sasaki.

Sasaki soon joined Tetsuhiro Kuroda's Team Kuroda with Shinjuku Shark, Naohiko Yamazaki and Azusa Kudo. Sasaki played a pivotal role in Kuroda's feud with Kodo Fuyuki. On February 6, the trio of Kuroda, Sasaki and Kyoko Inoue lost to the team of Fuyuki, GOEMON and Onryo, which stipulated that Kuroda must marry Inoue if he lost. On February 23, Sasaki and Kuroda lost to Fuyuki and The Great Sasuke with help from the returning Hayabusa. On April 1, Sasaki defeated Kintaro Kanemura in an upset to win the Hardcore Championship, the first singles championship of his career. Sasaki lost the title to Kanemura in a rematch at 12th Anniversary Show.

==== Various feuds and alliances (2001–2002) ====
On June 8, Kodo Fuyuki announced that he was going to sell FMW to Stuart Levy's Tokyopop as he owned the majority of the shares and offered the wrestlers to leave Shoichi Arai and side with him. Sasaki chose to join Fuyuki and defeated GOEMON later at the event. Sasaki began rising as a main event competitor and defeated Onryo on July 20, to earn his very first opportunity for the WEW World Heavyweight Championship against Hayabusa on the August 1 airing on Samurai! TV, but failed to win the title. On August 11, Sasaki and Chocoball Mukai unsuccessfully challenged GOEMON and Onryo in an octagon cage match for the WEW Tag Team Championship. On the September 17 airing on Samurai! TV, Sasaki teamed with Mr. Gannosuke to defeat GOEMON and Onryo for the title. A month later, they lost the title to Hayabusa and Tetsuhiro Kuroda on October 9. After the match, Senmu Yoshida announced that Shoichi Arai would be reinstated as FMW President if Hayabusa would be able to beat Sasaki on October 22, which ended in a no contest after Hayabusa slipped from the middle rope while attempting to perform a springboard moonsault on Sasaki and suffering an injury which ended Hayabusa's career.

Hayabusa's injury caused the World Tag Team Championship to be vacated. On November 23, Gannosuke and Sasaki defeated Biomonster DNA and Dr. Luther to win their second World Tag Team Championship. Later that night, the duo vacated the title to feud with Kodo Fuyuki, who had joined forces with Genichiro Tenryu's WAR group. Sasaki turned fan favorite by joining Gannosuke, Kintaro Kanemura and Tetsuhiro Kuroda to defend FMW against WAR. On December 9, Gannosuke, Sasaki, Kanemura and Kuroda defeated the WAR team of Tenryu, Fuyuki, Arashi and Koki Kitahara to gain revenge for FMW. After the match, Sasaki raised Hayabusa's mask to pay tribute to the injured Hayabusa. On December 21, Sasaki and Kanemura participated in a tournament for the vacated WEW World Tag Team Championship, defeating Super Crazy and Crazy Boy in the quarter-final and Balls Mahoney and Horace Boulder in the semi-final but lost to Mr. Gannosuke and Tetsuhiro Kuroda in the final. On January 6, 2002, the team of Gannosuke, Kuroda and Sasaki lost to Balls Mahoney, The Sandman and Vic Grimes. At FMW's last show on February 4, Sasaki teamed with GOEMON and Kintaro Kanemura to beat Grimes, Paul DeLuc and Mitsunobu Kikuzawa. On February 25, Shoichi Arai declared FMW bankrupt and closed the promotion. A few days later, Sasaki and GOEMON closed the FMW Dojo.

=== Wrestlings Marvelous Future (2002–2005) ===
After the closure of FMW and failed mixed martial arts venture, Sasaki worked a few shows for Kodo Fuyuki but fell out with him after Fuyuki brought out Atsushi Onita. Sasaki and a few former FMW wrestlers aligned with Hayabusa to establish Wrestlings Marvelous Future (WMF) promotion. Sasaki headlined WMF's debut show The Independence Day by defeating Garuda. On September 16, Mitsuhiro Matsunaga cost Sasaki, a match against Hisakatsu Oya and Sasaki defeated Matsunaga in a match on September 29 to rid WMF of him. Sasaki suffered an injury and returned to WMF at Marvelous Days on December 12 by wrestling Tetsuhiro Kuroda to a double count-out. Sasaki was pushed as the promotion's top fan favorite, feuding with the Brand Double Cross group and was eventually groomed to become the company's ace.

Sasaki defeated Mr. Gannosuke, with the help of Atsushi Onita on May 24. On July 25, Sasaki teamed with Tetsuhiro Kuroda and Kintaro Kanemura to defeat Gannosuke, Mr. Iwaonosuke and Mr. Rocknosuke in a street fight by debuting his new finishing move, 29 Years Old to prevent WMF from ending. At WMF's 1st Anniversary Show, Sasaki teamed with Ideka-kun and Tetsuhiro Kuroda against Hido, Mr. Gannosuke and Tetsuhiro Kuroda in a losing effort. Sasaki faced and defeated Ikeda-kun in a friendly match on September 23. On October 19, Sasaki lost a Caribbean Barbed Wire Board Ladder Deathmatch to Hido due to interference by Gannosuke, and then teamed with Hayabusa (Genichiro Tenryu) to defeat Gannosuke and Hido in a street fight on November 20. Following the match, Sasaki challenged Tenryu to a match on December 27, which Sasaki lost. After the match, Sasaki was embraced by Tenryu, his peers and rival Mr. Gannosuke as the two put away their differences by hugging each other. WMF took a hiatus in February 2004 and the promotion resumed on July 18. At WMF's 2nd Anniversary Show, Sasaki teamed with Seiya Morohashi and Tomohiko Hashimoto to defeat GOEMON, Junji Tanaka and Onryo.

In late 2004, Sasaki participated in a round robin tournament, where he qualified for the finals by defeating Mr. Gannosuke in a playoff and then lost to Soldier in the tournament final on February 20, 2005. Sasaki began appearing at Apache Army shows in early 2005 to distance himself from WMF as he was irate at Gannosuke booking himself as the focus of the promotion. Sasaki lost to Gannosuke in a barbed wire deathmatch on July 31. His last match for the promotion was a loss to Tetsuhiro Kuroda on August 5.

=== Independent circuit (2003–2009) ===
During his stay in WMF, Sasaki began competing in the Japanese independent circuit. He debuted for Fighting World of Japan Pro Wrestling on July 31, 2003 and competed a few matches for the promotion in 2003 and 2004. He debuted for Pro Wrestling Zero-One on December 24 by teaming with Tetsuhiro Kuroda to defeat Kohei Sato and Tatsuhito Takaiwa. After years of resistance for working with Apache Army, Sasaki finally joined the promotion on June 9 by defeating YOSHIYA. After debuting for Big Japan Pro Wrestling (BJW) on March 28, Sasaki teamed with Shadow WX to defeat Abdullah Kobayashi and Daisuke Sekimoto to win the BJW Tag Team Championship on February 27, 2006. After a lengthy reign, Sasaki and Shadow WX lost the title to Sekimoto and Yoshihito Sasaki on December 3. Sasaki would participate in Apache Army's round robin tournament for the vacated WEW World Tag Team Championship by teaming with GENTARO and they scored four points in the tournament before being eliminated.

On February 4, 2007, Sasaki received a title shot against Togi Makabe for the WEW Heavyweight Championship in a steel cage match, with Makabe retaining the title. Sasaki failed in another title shot against Makabe on April 15. On September 23, Sasaki finally won his first world championship by defeating Toru Yano for the WEW Heavyweight Championship. Sasaki successfully defended the title against Jun Kasai in a four corners of glass deathmatch on October 22. Sasaki held the title for nearly ten months, retaining it against Tetsuhiro Kuroda, Daisuke Sekimoto, Tomohiro Ishii and Takashi Sasaki, before losing the title to Ishii on July 12.

On July 13, Sasaki and Daisuke Sekimoto defeated Kengo Mashimo and Madoka to win his second BJW Tag Team Championship. They were forced to vacate the title on March 7, 2009, when Sasaki was injured in an automobile accident, which put him out of action for more than a year.

=== Pro Wrestling Freedoms (2010–present) ===
Sasaki debuted for Takashi Sasaki's Pro Wrestling Freedoms as a fan favorite on March 10, 2010, making his return to wrestling after the accident and joining the promotion full-time. On June 21, Sasaki made his in-ring debut for Freedoms in a loss to Daisuke Sekimoto. In 2011, Sasaki participated in the Death Match Tournament by defeating Kenji Fukimoto in a scramble bunkhouse deathmatch quarter-final and lost to Masada in a barbed wire board alpha deathmatch semi-final. On October 27, Sasaki and Kamui defeated Kengo Mashimo and Ryuichi Sekine to win the WEW Hardcore Tag Team Championship. They lost the title to The Brahman Brothers on January 9, 2012, but regained the title from Brahman Brothers in a rematch on February 11. Sasaki represented Freedoms against the Unchain group. On June 28, Sasaki suffered a neck injury during a hardcore match with Takashi Sasaki against Unchain's Tomoaki Honma and Masashi Takeda, which the former won but the injury forced Sasaki to vacate the Hardcore Tag Team Championship.

Sasaki returned from his injury on December 4 where he saved Susumu from an assault by Captain Abnormal. On January 15, 2013 airing of Samurai TV!, the team of Hiroki, Sasaki, Ryuchi Sekine and The Winger defeated Badboy Hido, Kenji Fukimoto, One Man Kru and Captain Abnormal in a scramble bunkhouse deathmatch. Sasaki participated in a tournament for the inaugural King of Freedom World Championship, losing to Minoru Fujita in the opening round on February 27. He entered the 2013 Death Match Tournament, losing to Jun Kasai in the opening round. In January 2014, Sasaki was paired with Toru Suguira to participate in a tournament for the inaugural King of Freedom World Tag Team Championship. They topped their Block B to advance to the semi-final where they lost to Takashi Sasaki and Tatsuhito Takaiwa.

In early 2015, Sasaki and Kamui began pursuing the King of Freedom World Tag Team Championship. On January 3, the duo challenged Jun Kasai and Masashi Takeda, Brahman Brothers, Takashi Sasaki and Tatsuhito Takaiwa and Kenichiro Arai and The Winger in a five-way match. On May 1, Sasaki and Kamui defeated Buffalo and Yuya Susumu to win the title. They successfully defended the title against fellow FMW alumni Mr. Gannosuke and Gosaku Goshogawara to celebrate Kamui's tenth anniversary of his career on May 17. They lost the title to Gentaro and Takashi Sasaki on July 26. Sasaki received his next title shot at the tag team title with Toru Suguira against Hayata and Yuya Susumu on November 17, 2016, but failed to win the title. Hayata and Susumu lost the titles to Brahman Brothers in early 2017 and Sasaki and Suguira defeated Hayata and Susumu to become the #1 contenders for the titles on March 2. On March 23, Sasaki and Suguira defeat Brahman Brothers to win the King of Freedom World Tag Team Championship. They became the longest reigning champions as they lost the title to Daisuke Masaoka and Violento Jack at F Spirit on May 24, 2018, ending their reign at 427 days.

== Mixed martial arts career ==
Following the closure of FMW, Sasaki decided to pursue a career in mixed martial arts and made his MMA debut at Pride Fighting Championships's Pride FC: The Best, Vol. 1 on February 22, 2002, losing to Jong Wang Kim by submission in twenty-five seconds and then retired from MMA after only one fight.

== Championships and accomplishments ==
- Big Japan Pro Wrestling
  - BJW World Tag Team Championship (2 times) – with Shadow WX (1), Daisuke Sekimoto (1)
- Frontier Martial-Arts Wrestling / World Entertainment Wrestling / Apache Pro-Wrestling Army
  - WEW Hardcore Championship (1 time)
  - WEW Hardcore Tag Team Championship (3 times, inaugural) – with Hideki Hosaka
  - WEW World Heavyweight Championship (1 time)
  - WEW World Tag Team Championship (2 times) – with Mr. Gannosuke
- Pro Wrestling Freedoms
  - WEW Hardcore Tag Team Championship (2 times) – with Kamui
  - King of Freedom World Tag Team Championship (3 times) – with Kamui (1), Toru Sugiura (1) and Violento Jack (1 time, current)

== Sumo career record ==
Naniwa Yoshinori
Year	January Hatsu basho, Tokyo	March Haru basho, Osaka	May Natsu basho, Tokyo	July Nagoya basho, Nagoya	September Aki basho, Tokyo	November Kyūshū basho, Fukuoka
1993	(Maezumo)	West Jonokuchi #46; 4–3	West Jonidan #157; 3–4	East Jonidan #177; 4–3	East Jonidan #142; 5–2	East Jonidan #96; 4–3
1994	East Jonidan #74; 4–3	West Jonidan #51; 2–5	West Jonidan #81; 4–3	West Jonidan #58; 5–2	West Jonidan #20; 3–4	East Jonidan #37; 5–2
1995	West Sandanme #98; 2–5	West Jonidan #34; 3–4	West Jonidan #51; 4–3	West Jonidan #26; 3–4	West Jonidan #48; 2–2–3	East Jonidan #80; Sat out due to injury 0–0–7
1996	East Jonidan #80; Sat out due to injury 0–0–7	East Jonidan #150; Sat out due to injury 0–0–7	East Jonokuchi #17; Sat out due to injury 0–0–7	(Banzukegai)	(Banzukegai)	Banzuke-gai; Retired –
Record given as wins–losses–absences Top division champion Top division runner-up Retired Lower divisions Non-participation Sanshō key: F=Fighting spirit; O=Outstanding performance; T=Technique Also shown: ★=Kinboshi; P=Playoff(s); Divisions: Makuuchi — Jūryō — Makushita — Sandanme — Jonidan — Jonokuchi Makuuchi ranks: Yokozuna — Ōzeki — Sekiwake — Komusubi — Maegashira

== Mixed martial arts record ==
Professional record breakdown
1 match	0 wins	1 loss
By submission	0	1

Res.	Record	Opponent	Method	Event	Date	Round	Time	Location	Notes
Loss	0-1-0	Jong Wang Kim	Submission (guillotine choke)	Pride FC: The Best, Vol. 1	February 22, 2002	1	0:25	Tokyo, Japan	
