= FMW/WEW Hardcore Championship =

Professional wrestling championship

WEW Hardcore Championship

Details
- Promotion: Frontier Martial-Arts Wrestling
- Date established: September 24, 1999
- Date retired: May 22, 2001

Other names
- FMW Hardcore Championship; WEW Hardcore Championship
Statistics
- First champion: Kintaro Kanemura
- Final champion: Kintaro Kanemura
- Most reigns: Kintaro Kanemura (3 reigns)
- Longest reign: Kintaro Kanemura (331 days)
- Shortest reign: Kintaro Kanemura (17 days)
- Oldest champion: Kintaro Kanemura (30 years, 269 days)
- Youngest champion: Mammoth Sasaki (26 years, 252 days)
- Heaviest champion: Mammoth Sasaki (275 lb (125 kg))
- Lightest champion: Ryuji Yamakawa (198 lb (90 kg))

The FMW/WEW Hardcore Championship was a hardcore wrestling championship contested in Frontier Martial-Arts Wrestling.

== Title history ==
Key
No.	Overall reign number
Reign	Reign number for the specific champion
Days	Number of days held

No.	Champion	Championship change			Reign statistics		Notes	Ref.
No.	Champion	Date	Event	Location	Reign	Days	Notes	Ref.
1	Kintaro Kanemura	September 24, 1999	Making of a New Legend III Tour	Tokyo, Japan	1	151	The title was awarded to Kanemura by FMW Commissioner Kodo Fuyuki.	
2	Ryuji Yamakawa	February 22, 2000	Big Japan Pro Wrestling's Excite Series Tour	Tokyo, Japan	1	73		
3	Kintaro Kanemura	May 5, 2000	11th Anniversary Show: Backdraft	Tokyo, Japan	2	331		
4	Mammoth Sasaki	April 1, 2001	Fighting Creation Tour	Tokyo, Japan	1	34		
5	Kintaro Kanemura	May 5, 2001	12th Anniversary Show: Kawasaki Legend	Kawasaki, Japan	3	17		
—	Deactivated	May 22, 2001	—	—	—	—	Kintaro Kanemura vacated the title and the title was retired afterwards.	

== Combined reigns ==
Rank	Wrestler	No. of reigns	Combined days
1	Kintaro Kanemura	3	499
2	Ryuji Yamakawa	1	73
3	Mammoth Sasaki	1	34
