= Tetsuhiro Kuroda =

Japanese professional wrestler

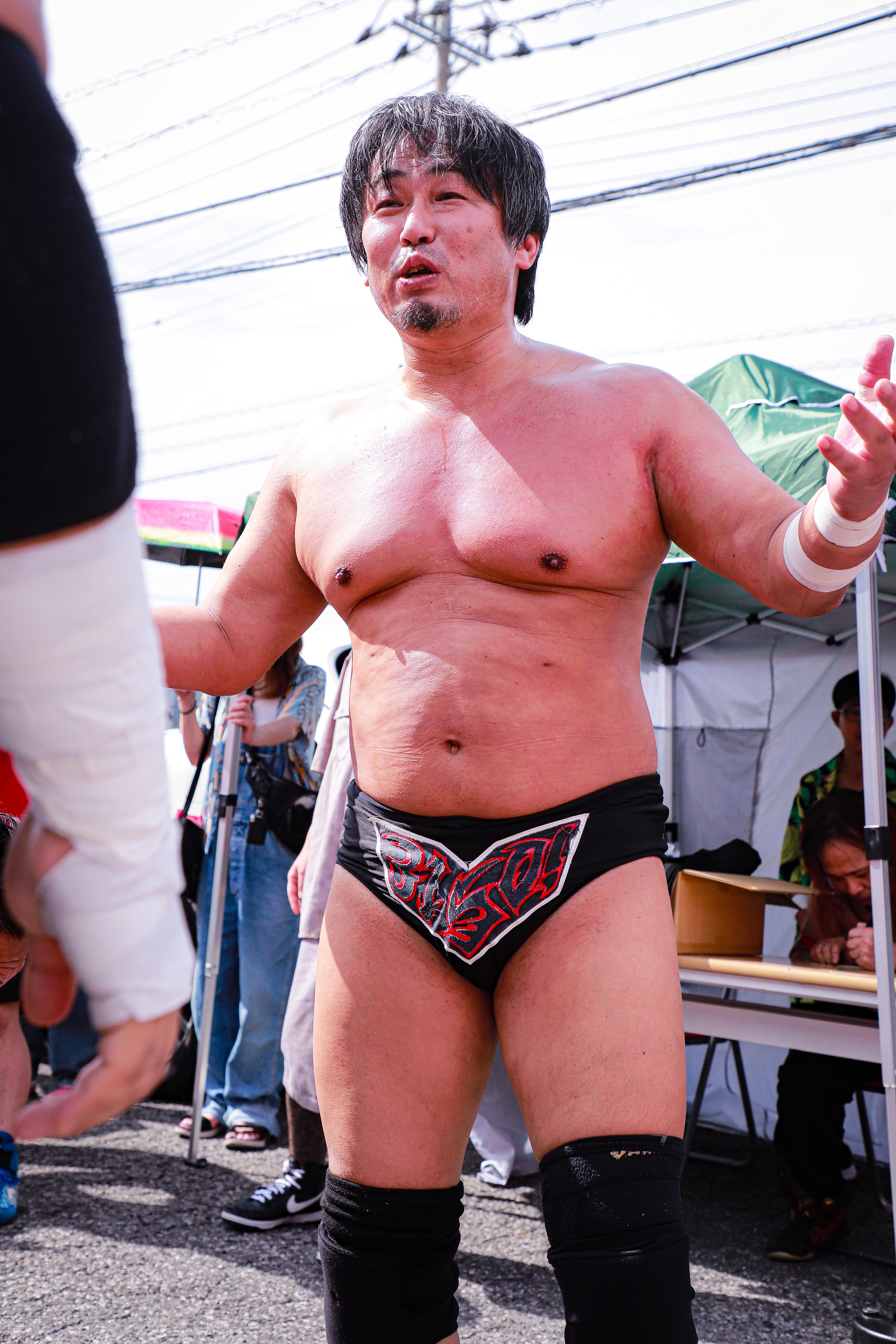
- Tetsuhiro Kuroda in 2023

Personal information
- Born: Tetsuhiro Kuroda; November 23, 1971 (age 54) Hakodate, Hokkaido, Japan

Professional wrestling career
- Ring name(s): Tetsuhiro Kuroda; Kurodaman
- Billed height: 5 ft 11 in (1.80 m)
- Billed weight: 100 kg (220 lb)
- Trained by: Pro Wrestling Crusaders Dojo; FMW Dojo
- Debut: March 18, 1993

Tetsuhiro Kuroda (黒田 哲広, Kuroda Tetsuhiro; born 23 November 1971) is a Japanese professional wrestler, currently competing as a freelancer on the Japanese independent circuit. He is best known for his time with Frontier Martial-Arts Wrestling (FMW), where he primarily competed from 1993 until the promotion's closure in 2002.

He started his FMW career after being trained at the FMW Dojo in 1993 and initially worked in low-card matches as an enhancement talent during his initial years with the company until he joined Atsushi Onita's ZEN faction in 1997, earning his first title shot at the FMW Brass Knuckles Heavyweight Championship and the FMW Independent Heavyweight Championship that December. He would remain a part of many factions throughout the late 1990s and began rising to the main event status, winning his first WEW Heavyweight Championship in 2000. By the end of the year, the underdog Kuroda established himself as the company's top villain and formed his own group Team Kuroda to feud with the company's top fan favorite Hayabusa. He headlined the company's flagship event FMW Anniversary Show in 2001.

Kuroda won several championships in his career including being a four-time WEW Heavyweight Champion. He was a highly decorated tag team champion, winning the FMW Brass Knuckles Tag Team Championship once, the WEW World Tag Team Championship ten times, the FMW World Street Fight 6-Man Tag Team Championship three times, the WEW 6-Man Tag Team Championship four times, the All Asia Tag Team Championship two times and the WMG Tag Team Championship once.

== Professional wrestling career ==
=== Frontier Martial-Arts Wrestling ===
==== Early years (1993–1996) ====
Kuroda began his professional wrestling career in January 1993, when he was trained by Pro Wrestling Crusaders (PWC) at their dojo and made his debut on March 18, 1993, against Hideki Hosaka. PWC closed after a few months and Kuroda resumed his training at the Frontier Martial-Arts Wrestling (FMW) dojo. He made his FMW debut as a fan favorite with Masato Tanaka by losing to Dark Ranger and Masaru Toi in a tag team match on October 15. Kuroda remained in the low card for many years in the company and was usually utilized in opening matches on the card and served as an enhancement talent against higher level opponents, winning against only lesser known talent. He was often paired with fellow newcomer Tanaka in mid-card matches during the early years of his career and often wrestled Tanaka, Koji Nakagawa and Gosaku Goshogawara. Kuroda's first main event match took place on November 26, 1994, when he teamed with Atsushi Onita, Katsutoshi Niiyama and Masato Tanaka to defeat Mr. Pogo, The Gladiator, Hideki Hosaka and Hisakatsu Oya in a no ropes barbed wire street fight deathmatch. Kuroda would team with Onita, Niiyama and Tanaka in several street fights during late 1994 and early 1995. In the summer of 1995, Kuroda was entered into the Young Spirit Tournament, a round robin tournament consisting of rising rookies of the company. He would lose all of his matches in the tournament against W*ING Kanemura, Hideki Hosaka, Koji Nakagawa and Hido, while wrestling Masato Tanaka to a double knockout to gain one point in the tournament.

Kuroda received the first championship match of his career on May 19, 1996, by teaming with Masato Tanaka and Katsutoshi Niiyama against Super Leather and The Headhunters for the World Street Fight 6-Man Tag Team Championship but were defeated. The following month, on June 28, Kuroda and Tanaka won the title with Koji Nakagawa by defeating Super Leather and The Headhunters to give Kuroda, his first championship of his career. They successfully defended the title against Hisakatsu Oya, Ricky Fuji and The Gladiator and Terry Funk, Horace Boulder and The Gladiator on September 20. On November 16, Nakagawa, Tanaka and Kuroda were booked to drop the title to Hisakatsu Oya and The Headhunters. Kuroda headlined the Year End Spectacular event on December 11 by teaming with Atsushi Onita, Mr. Pogo and Masato Tanaka to defeat Funk Masters of Wrestling members Terry Funk, Hisakatsu Oya and The Headhunters.

==== Various alliances and initial main event push (1997–1999) ====
On September 23, 1997, Kuroda began receiving his first major push by last eliminating Mr. Pogo #2 to win a battle royal featuring major FMW wrestlers. Five days later, at Kawasaki Legend: Fall Spectacular, Kuroda won a royal rumble match by last eliminating Ricky Fuji to win a cheque of 10,000,000 yens. On September 30, Kuroda turned into a villain by joining Atsushi Onita's faction ZEN to feud with FMW. On October 14, Kuroda won his second World Street Fight 6-Man Tag Team Championship by teaming with Onita and Hido to defeat Hayabusa, Koji Nakagawa and Masato Tanaka. On October 21, Kuroda pinned his friend Tanaka for the first time in his career in an eight-man tag team match, thus earning his very first title shot at the Double Championship (the unified Brass Knuckles Heavyweight Championship and the Independent Heavyweight Championship) held by Tanaka on December 5, where he lost. On December 20, Onita, Hido and Kuroda lost the World Street Fight 6-Man Tag Team Championship to Hayabusa, Hisakatsu Oya and Masato Tanaka during the Super Extreme Wrestling War tour.

In 1998, ZEN turned into a fan favorite group after Mr. Gannosuke, Yukihiro Kanemura and Hido turned on Onita and quit ZEN to form their new group Team No Respect. On January 7, 1998, Onita, Nakagawa and Kuroda competed at ZEN's first promoted show and scored a win against Gannosuke, Kanemura and Hido to gain revenge. On February 13, Onita, Nakagawa and Kuroda defeated Gannosuke, Kanemura and Jado to win the World Street Fight 6-Man Tag Team Championship. Kuroda played an important role in ZEN's rivalry with TNR. In March, Kuroda participated in a #1 contender's tournament for the Double Championship, where he ended up losing to Jado in the opening round. Kuroda and The Gladiator lost to TNR members Horace Boulder and Super Leather at the company's first pay-per-view event 9th Anniversary Show. The following night, Kuroda debuted for All Japan Pro Wrestling (AJPW) at the company's twenty-fifth anniversary show Showdown at the Egg by teaming with Gladiator and Hideki Hosaka against Akira Taue, Takao Omori and Masao Inoue in a losing effort. On May 5, Onita, Nakagawa and Kuroda lost the World Street Fight 6-Man Tag Team Championship to TNR members Hido, Kodo Fuyuki and Yukihiro Kanemura. After the title loss, Onita disbanded ZEN. Kuroda and Nakagawa lost to Fuyuki and Kanemura on May 19.

Hideki Hosaka and Kuroda were forced to become TNR's slaves after losing matches to TNR on May 25 and May 26 respectively. On June 13, Kuroda was forced to wrestle Hosaka in a match by TNR, which Kuroda won. On June 19, Kuroda lost to Masato Tanaka in Tanaka's farewell match as he was departing the promotion for Extreme Championship Wrestling (ECW). TNR forced Kuroda and Hosaka to wrestle one another again on July 10 and Kuroda once again emerged victorious. On August 11, Kuroda lost to Hosaka in a rematch. Later in the night, Atsushi Onita, Shoichi Arai, Mr. Pogo and Yoshinori Sasaki defeated Go Ito, Kodo Fuyuki, Yukihiro Kanemura and Koji Nakagawa in a match to restore Arai's presidency over FMW and free Hosaka and Kuroda from TNR.

On August 21, Kuroda and Hosaka became the founding members of the new group Team Zero with Onita, Mr. Pogo and Yoshinori Sasaki and the group wore kilts. The duo would lose to Hayabusa and Hisakatsu Oya in their first match as members of Team Zero. On September 1, Team Zero fought TNR in a match with Team Zero's kilts and TNR's briefs on the line. Team Zero won to retain their kilts and rip off TNR's briefs. On September 4, Team Zero defeated TNR in a street fight. Kuroda lost to TNR member Koji Nakagawa in a singles match on September 8. Kuroda began rising as a singles star as he issued a challenge to the returning Mr. Gannosuke and defeated Gannosuke's TNR teammate Yukihiro Kanemura to get an upset victory on October 6. Kuroda lost to the returning Gannosuke in a hard-fought match on November 20. In December, Kuroda participated in an Over the Top Tournament to determine the #1 contender for the Double Championship by defeating Super Leather in the first round and Muhammad Yone in the quarter-final before losing to Hisakatsu Oya in the semi-final.

Kuroda began 1999 by competing in high-profile matches with Hayabusa and the returning Masato Tanaka. Kuroda formed a tag team with Tanaka as the two unsuccessfully challenged Hayabusa and Jinsei Shinzaki for the All Asia Tag Team Championship on March 19. Tanaka and Kuroda participated in a round robin tournament for the vacant Brass Knuckles Tag Team Championship, in which they defeated Hido and Yukihiro Kanemura, Hideki Hosaka and Super Leather, Hisakatsu Oya and Mr. Gannosuke, and Armageddon. while fighting Hayabusa and Kodo Fuyuki and Daisuke Ikeda and Muhammad Yone to thirty-minute time limit draws and suffered their only loss against Gedo and Koji Nakagawa. On May 3, Tanaka and Kuroda defeated Gedo and Nakagawa in the playoff match and Hayabusa and Fuyuki in the final round to win the tournament and the tag team titles. On May 5, Tanaka and Kuroda defeated Darkside Hayabusa and Jinsei Shinzaki in a non-title match after Kuroda pinned Hayabusa for the first time in his career to become the #1 contender for the Double Championship. He received his title match in the main event against Kodo Fuyuki and was defeated. Tanaka and Kuroda successfully defended the Brass Knuckles Tag Team Championship against Hido and Yukihiro Kanemura before losing the title to Gedo and Nakagawa in their second title defense on June 13.

Tanaka and Kuroda joined Hayabusa and FMW in their war with Team No Respect as the FMW team defeated TNR in a ten-man elimination tag team match on May 31. On June 15, the FMW team of Hayabusa, Tanaka and Kuroda defeated TNR members Hido, Mr. Gannosuke and Yukihiro Kanemura in a ladder match with the stipulation that Kodo Fuyuki would be forced to eat dog food if TNR lost. On June 20, Team FMW defeated TNR in a three out of five falls match. Tanaka and Kuroda teamed with Hayabusa to participate in a round robin tournament for the new WEW 6-Man Tag Team Championship, where the team lost to Kodo Fuyuki, Koji Nakagawa and Gedo in the final on July 31.

Kuroda teamed with new partner Hisakatsu Oya to defeat Gedo and Koji Nakagawa to win the WEW Tag Team Championship on August 23. On August 25, Kuroda, Oya and Yoshinori Sasaki unsuccessfully challenged Kodo Fuyuki, Koji Nakagawa and Gedo for the WEW 6-Man Tag Team Championship. Kuroda continued to side with Hayabusa, who had transformed into H to battle Fuyuki and his allies. On September 23, Kuroda, Oya and Masato Tanaka defeated Fuyuki, Nakagawa and Gedo to capture the six-man tag team title. Kuroda and Oya successfully defended the WEW Tag Team Championship against Raven and Tommy Dreamer at the 10th Anniversary Show. On December 1, Kuroda and Oya lost the title to H and Mr. Gannosuke and lost in a rematch for the title. On December 12, Kuroda and Masato Tanaka were defeated by H and Gannosuke in a tag team match. After the match, Kuroda shook hands with his opponents while Tanaka refused to do so as he was angry at H for forgiving Gannosuke so easily.

==== WEW Heavyweight Champion (2000–2001) ====
Kuroda defeated Masato Tanaka in singles competition for the first time in his career to win his first WEW Heavyweight Championship on January 5, 2000. He retained the title in his first title defense against Willie Takayama on February 25. Kodo Fuyuki returned to FMW and formed the ECW Japan group and became the contender to Kuroda's title. Kuroda retained the title against Fuyuki on March 27 via a no contest after ECW Japan interrupted the match and FMW wrestlers came to Kuroda's rescue. Kuroda lost the title to Fuyuki in a rematch at the 11th Anniversary Show on May 5. Kuroda competed against H and Mr. Gannosuke in a #1 contender's three-way dance for the WEW Heavyweight Championship with Fuyuki as the special guest referee and was eliminated by H after a fast count by Fuyuki. Kuroda would remain out of the title picture for the next few months and competed with H against Fuyuki and his allies. On June 26, Kuroda, H and Hisakatsu Oya defeated Fuyuki, Kyoko Inoue and Chocoball Mukai to win the WEW 6-Man Tag Team Championship. During this time, Kuroda had a brief feud with Kyoko Inoue, who he defeated in a cooking death match on July 28. On July 30, H, Kuroda and Oya made a successful title defense against Hideki Hosaka, Kintaro Kanemura and Yoshinori Sasaki.

Kuroda received his rematch against Kodo Fuyuki for the WEW Heavyweight Championship on August 26, with Fuyuki retaining the title. Kuroda, Hayabusa and Hisakatsu Oya lost the WEW 6-Man Tag Team Championship to Fuyuki, Mr. Gannosuke and Shinjuku Shark on September 15. Kuroda began a rivalry with Gannosuke after the two began brawling with each other in a six-man tag team match on September 21. On September 26, Kuroda teamed with Onryo against Gannosuke and Goemon in a losing effort after Kuroda tapped out to an armbar by Gannosuke to Kuroda's injured shoulder. Gannosuke went crazy and attacked Kuroda during his matches, costing him wins against Chocoball Mukai and Gedo. At Deep Throat, Kuroda forced Gannosuke to retire by defeating him in a match by debuting his new finishing move Technan Buster DDT, which stipulated that Gannosuke would have to retire on losing due to his insane behaviour. Later that night, Kuroda began turning into a villain by attacking Hayabusa, who was taking a hiatus due to injury. Kuroda then proclaimed that he would become the new ace of FMW.

On November 28, Kuroda teamed with Masato Tanaka against Jado and Gedo and the team of Kodo Fuyuki and Kintaro Kanemura in a three-way tag team match, during which he completed his villainous turn by attacking first Jado and Gedo and then his partner Tanaka with a lariat and sided with Fuyuki and Kanemura, making it a six-man tag team match, in which Kuroda, Fuyuki and Kanemura defeated Tanaka, Jado and Gedo. The two teams met in a barbed wire street fight on December 20, where Kuroda's team won again after he pinned Jado to get the victory. On December 24, Kuroda and Fuyuki defeated Tamon Honda and Naomichi Marufuji to win the WEW Tag Team Championship at Pro Wrestling NOAH's Great Voyage pay-per-view. They lost the title to Tanaka and Gedo on January 7, 2001, after Kuroda turned on Fuyuki and formed Team Kuroda with Azusa Kudo, Shinjuku Shark and Naohiko Yamazaki. After the match, Kuroda humiliated Fuyuki by putting makeup and Kyoko Inoue's bra on him until Inoue made the rescue, thus becoming the top villain of the company. On January 16, Fuyuki defeated Kuroda in a match, which stipulated that Kuroda must marry Inoue if Fuyuki won. On February 6, Kuroda teamed with Inoue and Team Kuroda's newest member Mammoth Sasaki against Fuyuki, Goemon and Onryo in an intergender tag team match, which stipulated that Kuroda must marry Inoue if Inoue pinned Fuyuki. Kuroda hit a lariat on Inoue, costing her the match against Fuyuki. Following the match, Kuroda mocked Hayabusa provoking him to come and fight him but he was attacked by Team Kuroda until The Great Sasuke made the save.

On February 23, Kuroda and Mammoth Sasaki lost to Fuyuki and Sasuke in a tag team match after Sasuke pinned Kuroda, setting up a naked man death match between the two on March 5, which stipulated that one needed to tear off others' clothes and pin his opponent. Kuroda won the match. Kuroda defeated Kintaro Kanemura to become the #1 contender for Fuyuki's WEW Heavyweight Championship on March 13, and defeated Fuyuki, with the help of the reinstated Mr. Gannosuke to win the title for a second time on April 1. Gannosuke joined Team Kuroda and then the two attacked Hayabusa, who was watching the match from ringside until The Great Sasuke made the save but got beaten as well. Kuroda and Gannosuke lost to Hayabusa and Sasuke in an exploding octagon cage electric bomb death match at the 12th Anniversary Show on May 5. Team Kuroda began to split after they lost a six-man tag team match to Hayabusa, Hisakatsu Oya and Ricky Fuji due to a miscommunication between Kuroda and Gannosuke on May 11. On May 22, Kuroda lost the WEW Heavyweight Championship to Hayabusa in a barbed wire double hell match, with Kodo Fuyuki as the special guest referee.

==== Defending FMW (2001–2002) ====
On June 8, Kuroda turned into a fan favorite by siding with Hayabusa and Shoichi Arai after Kodo Fuyuki announced that he had bought 48% of the shares in FMW. This marked the end of Team Kuroda and Kuroda made peace with rival Hayabusa and formed an alliance and faced Mr. Gannosuke and Kintaro Kanemura in the main event and lost their match. On August 11, Kuroda was defeated by Gannosuke via submission in a best of three match series between FMW and Fuyuki's team with Hayabusa's 5% stock in the company on the line. Hayabusa lost the third match in the series, thus losing his stock to Fuyuki. On September 9, Kuroda teamed with Hayabusa and Goemon to defeat Gannosuke, Fuyuki and Kintaro Kanemura to win the WEW 6-Man Tag Team Championship. The following month, on October 9, Kuroda and Hayabusa defeated Mr. Gannosuke and Mammoth Sasaki to win the WEW Tag Team Championship. On October 22, Hayabusa suffered an injury in a match against Mammoth Sasaki and Kuroda was stripped of both titles on November 5.

Fuyuki introduced Garuda to FMW to replaced Hayabusa as the company's new ace but Garuda turned on Fuyuki and sided with Kuroda and the fan favorites. On November 23, Kuroda and Garuda lost to Fuyuki and Genichiro Tenryu and then Kuroda formed an alliance with Mr. Gannosuke, Kintaro Kanemura and Mammoth Sasaki to feud with Fuyuki, who had turned on FMW to become a loyalist of Tenryu and his WAR group. Garuda left FMW and Kuroda became the new ace of FMW. On December 9, FMW's team of Kuroda, Gannosuke, Kanemura and Sasaki defeated WAR's team of Fuyuki, Tenryu, Arashi and Koki Kitahara. On December 21, Kuroda and Gannosuke defeated Goemon and Onryo, Sabu and Yoshito Sasaki and Kintaro Kanemura and Mammoth Sasaki to win a one-night eight-man tag team tournament for the vacant WEW Tag Team Championship. On January 6, 2002, Gannosuke broke his ankles during a six-man tag team match between the team of Gannosuke, Kuroda and Sasaki against Fuyuki's foreigner team of Balls Mahoney, The Sandman and Vic Grimes, which would cost Kuroda's team the match. The following month, on February 4, Kuroda was stripped of the WEW Tag Team Championship due to Gannosuke's injury and he teamed with Sabu to take on Fuyuki and Sandman for the vacant title in the main event and ended up losing the match. This would turn out to be the last ever match in FMW history as Shoichi Arai closed FMW due to bankruptcy on February 15.

=== World Entertainment Wrestling (2002–2004) ===
Kodo Fuyuki quickly picked up the venues and dates that FMW had originally planned after February 2002 and began booking his own shows on the same dates under the "Fuyuki Army" banner. Kuroda competed at Fuyuki Army shows in April and then signed a contract with Fuyuki's new promotion World Entertainment Wrestling (WEW), the successor to FMW. Kuroda competed at WEW's debut show on May 5, losing to Akira Taue. Kuroda would soon begin competing in the Japanese independent circuit along with WEW, most notably his friend Eiji Ezaki's Wrestlings Marvelous Future (WMF). The WEW titles of FMW were restored in the company as Kuroda took on Kintaro Kanemura for the WEW Heavyweight Championship on August 23 and lost the match after Fuyuki ordered Garuda to attack Kuroda for competing in WMF. On October 23, Kuroda won the WEW 6-Man Tag Team Championship with Gosaku Goshogawara and TAKA Michinoku by defeating Masato Tanaka, Shinjiro Otani and Kuroge Wagyuta. Kuroda also won the WEW Tag Team Championship with Kintaro Kanemura by defeating GENTARO and Takeshi Sasaki on March 11, 2003. Kuroda lost to Masato Tanaka at WEW's last show, which aired on May 18 on Samurai TV. The Tag Team Championship was vacated after WEW's closure and Kuroda, Goshogawara and Michinoku lost the 6-Man Tag Team Championship to 2 Tuff Tony, Kintaro Kanemura and Mad Man Pondo at a Fuyuki Army show on October 2. They were the longest reigning 6-Man Tag Team Champions, with their reign lasting at 344 days.

=== Freelance (2002–present) ===
During his time in WEW, Kuroda debuted for Dramatic Dream Team on April 25 as a WEW representative and began touring the Japanese independent circuit. He debuted for Pro Wrestling Zero-One alongside Kintaro Kanemura on June 29 as challengers for Masato Tanaka and Shinjiro Otani's NWA Intercontinental Tag Team Championship, which Tanaka and Otani retained. He represented WEW in the company's prestigious 2002 Fire Festival, where he reached the finals by topping his Block B with six points and lost to Shinjiro Otani in the final round. He primarily competed for Hayabusa's WMF, debuting for the company at The Independence Day by teaming with Hisakatsu Oya to defeat Mr. Gannosuke and Jinsei Shinzaki with the show airing on September 5. Kuroda formed a stable with Goemon, Hisakatsu Oya and Soldier called Brand Double Cross and the group became the top villainous group of the company.

In early 2003, Kuroda teamed with Chocoball Mukai to participate in Pro Wrestling NOAH's first Differ Cup tournament, in which they lost to Kudo and Mikami in the quarter-final. In the summer of 2003, Kuroda and Kanemura participated in a round robin tournament for the vacant All Asia Tag Team Championship, in which they scored four points. Kuroda next participated in the 2003 Fire Festival, in which he scored four points and failed to qualify for the final. Kuroda and Kanemura unsuccessfully challenged Hirotaka Yokoi and Kohei Sato for the All Asia Tag Team Championship on August 18 but defeated Yokoi and Sato in a rematch to win the title on October 10. They vacated the title at the Infinity pay-per-view after Kanemura suffered an injury. On the same event, Kuroda unsuccessfully challenged Wataru Sakata for the International Junior Heavyweight Championship. Kuroda recaptured the All Asia Tag Team Championship by teaming with Mr. Gannosuke to defeat Jun Kasai and Tengu Kaiser on December 25. Gannosuke and Kuroda lost the title to The Great Kosuke and Shiryu on January 2, 2004, at an AJPW event.

Kintaro Kanemura formed a freelancer stable of former FMW wrestlers called Apache Army and Kuroda was a part of the group. They would compete at several promotions most notably Pro-Wrestling Zero1. They worked many Zero-One shows and pay-per-views for the new Hustle promotion. Kuroda participated in his third straight Fire Festival in the summer of 2004, in which he scored only three points. At Hustle-2, Kuroda, Kanemura and Masato Tanaka defeated Justin Credible, Sabu and The Gladiator in a match between former FMW champions and former ECW champions. In the summer of 2004, the group founded their own promotion Apache Army and Kuroda lost to Takao Omori at the promotion's first show on August 30. On November 28, Kuroda promoted his own show for the first time ever titled Tetsuhiro Kuroda Festival, which he headlined by teaming with Hido to get a tag team victory over Ryuji Ito and The Winger in a hardcore rules match.

On March 12, 2005, Kuroda and Onryo defeated Takeshi Sasaki and GENTARO to revive the WEW World Tag Team Championship in Apache Army. The title would be vacated later in the year. At Hustle-8, Kuroda participated in a battle royal to determine the promotion's inaugural Hardcore Hero Champion. Masato Tanaka won the battle royal. On April 16, 2005, Kuroda and Hido defeated Kintaro Kanemura and Tomohiro Ishii to win Riki Pro's World Magma the Greatest (WMG) Tag Team Championship. On September 10, Kuroda participated in a battle royal for the Hardcore Hero Championship at Hustle-12, which was won by Tadao Yasuda. The title was vacated in 2006 after the promotion closed. On January 28, 2006, Kuroda debuted for New Japan Pro-Wrestling (NJPW) by teaming with Kintaro Kanemura and Hido against Control Terrorism Unit (Jyushin Thunder Liger, Jado and Gedo), with the match ending in a no contest after Apache Army and CTU began brawling with each other. A rematch took place between the two teams on February 19, which CTU won. On January 8, 2007, Kuroda unsuccessfully challenged Togi Makabe for the WEW Heavyweight Championship. On March 17, Kuroda debuted a new masked character named Kurodaman as he teamed with Kintaro Kanemura, who competed as Kintaman in a tag team match against Kohei Sato and Giant Sabo at the HUSTLE House Vol. 23 pay-per-view. He worked many shows for Hustle as Kurodaman while teaming with Kintaman from 2007 to 2009.

He received subsequent title shots for the WEW Heavyweight Championship in 2008 against Mammoth Sasaki and Tomohiro Ishii but failed to win the title. In 2009, Kuroda participated in his fourth Fire Festival, where he lost three out of four matches in his block, winning only against Daisuke Sekimoto. On July 25, 2011, Kuroda and Kintaro Kanemura defeated HIROKI and Yusaku Obata at an Apache Army show to earn a title shot at the WEW World Tag Team Championship, which they won by defeating tag team champions Kohei Sato and KAMIKAZE on August 18. They lost the title to HIROKI and Yusaku Obata on September 28. Kuroda unsuccessfully challenged Arashi for the WEW Heavyweight Championship on February 29, 2012, but defeated Arashi in a rematch to win the title for the third time on April 26. He made a successful title defense against Shoichi Ichimiya on June 25 and then vacated the title to put it for grabs in Takeover the Independent Tournament. He defeated Kintaro Kanemura, Manjimaru, Arashi and Takeshi Minamino to win the tournament and his fourth WEW Heavyweight Championship. He lost the title to Kintaro Kanemura in a street fight on September 1, 2013.

On September 7, 2014, Kuroda and Ryoji Sai defeated Tadasuke and Tomohiko Hashimoto to win the WEW Tag Team Championship. They lost the title to Kazushi Miyamoto and Tomohiko Hashimoto on May 31, 2015. On August 28, 2016, Kuroda and Kanemura defeated Hi69 and Hasegawa during Kanemura's retirement tour to win the tag team championship for the second time as a team and marked Kuroda's fifth reign with the title. They lost the title to Keisuke Okuda and Tomohiko Hashimoto on October 2. Kuroda then teamed with Tatsuhito Takaiwa to beat Okuda and Hashimoto for the title at Apache Army's last show Final Gong on December 25. Apache closed down but Kuroda and Takaiwa kept the titles. On January 5, 2017, Kuroda debuted for the resurrected FMW under the Chō Sentō Puroresu FMW name by competing with Masato Tanaka and NOSAWA Rongai against Atsushi Onita, Hideki Hosaka and Ricky Fuji in a losing effort. On April 16, Kuroda and Takaiwa lost the titles to Masashi Takeda and Tomohiko Hashimoto on A-Team's Take Off event.

== Championships and accomplishments ==
- Mobius
  - Apex of Triangle Six–Man Tag Team Championship (1 time) – with Daisuke Sekimoto and Nosawa Rongai
- All Japan Pro Wrestling
  - All Asia Tag Team Championship (2 times) - with Mr. Gannosuke (1) and Kintaro Kanemura (1)
- Apache Pro-Wrestling Army
  - WEW Heavyweight Championship (2 times)
  - WEW World Tag Team Championship (5 times) - with Onryo (1), Kintaro Kanemura (2), Ryoji Sai (1) and Tatsuhito Takaiwa (1)
  - Takeover the Independent Tournament (2012)
- DDT Pro Wrestling
  - Ironman Heavymetalweight Championship (1 time)
- Fighting World of Japan Pro Wrestling
  - World Magma the Greatest Tag Team Championship (1 time) - with Hido
- Frontier Martial-Arts Wrestling / World Entertainment Wrestling
  - FMW Brass Knuckles Tag Team Championship (1 time) - with Masato Tanaka
  - FMW World Street Fight 6-Man Tag Team Championship (3 times) - with Masato Tanaka and Koji Nakagawa (1), Atsushi Onita and Hido (1), and Atsushi Onita and Koji Nakagawa (1)
  - WEW 6-Man Tag Team Championship (4 times) - with Hisakatsu Oya and Masato Tanaka (1), H/Hayabusa and Hisakatsu Oya (1), Hayabusa and Goemon (1), and Taka Michinoku and Gosaku Goshogawara (1)
  - WEW Heavyweight Championship (2 times)
  - WEW Tag Team Championship (5 times) - with Hisakatsu Oya (1), Kodo Fuyuki (1), Hayabusa (1), Mr. Gannosuke (1) and Kintaro Kanemura (1)
  - FMW Brass Knuckles Tag Team Championship Tournament (1999) - with Masato Tanaka
  - WEW Tag Team Championship Tournament (2001) - with Mr. Gannosuke
- Pro Wrestling HEAT UP
  - Burning King Tournament (2018)
- Secret Base
  - Captain of the Secret Base Tag Team Championship (1 time) - with Ferist
- Total Triumph Team
  - TTT Indie Unified Tag Team Championship (1 time) – with Masked Mystery
  - TTT Indie Unified Six Man Tag Team Championship (1 time) – with Guts Ishijima and Masked Mystery
