= WEW Heavyweight Championship =

Professional wrestling championship

- The WEW Heavyweight Championship belt introduced by Pro-Wrestling A-Team in 2018

Details
- Promotion: FMW (1999–2002); WEW (2002–2004); Apache (2004–2016); A-Team (2018–present)
- Date established: September 24, 1999
- Current champion: Super Tiger (II)
- Date won: April 20, 2025

Other names
- WEW Singles Championship (1999); WEW World Heavyweight Championship (1999–2002); WEW Heavyweight Championship (2002–present)
Statistics
- First champion: Kodo Fuyuki
- Most reigns: Kintaro Kanemura (6 reigns)
- Longest reign: Tomohiro Ishii (959 days)
- Shortest reign: Kintaro Kanemura (2 days)
- Oldest champion: Kim Duk (70 years, 123 days)
- Youngest champion: Masato Tanaka (26 years, 268 days)
- Heaviest champion: Arashi (146 kg (322 lb))
- Lightest champion: Koji Kanemoto (80 kg (180 lb))

The WEW Heavyweight Championship (Japanese: WEWヘビー級王座, Hepburn: WEW Hebī-kyū Ōza) was a professional wrestling championship, originally created in Frontier Martial-Arts Wrestling (FMW) as the WEW Singles Championship (WEWシングル王座, WEW Shinguru Ōza), later being renamed as the WEW World Heavyweight Championship. After FMW closed in 2002, the title became the WEW Heavyweight Championship in the World Entertainment Wrestling promotion, although carrying a new lineage.

== History ==
In May 1995, Atsushi Onita went into retirement and sold Frontier Martial-Arts Wrestling to ring announcer Shoichi Arai. Under Arai, the company underwent changes that would phase out the deathmatch style that popularized FMW in the early 90s. Arai enlisted Kodo Fuyuki to bring in a more "sports entertainment" look and feel for the promotion. In 1999, this resulted in the creation of the World Entertainment Wrestling (WEW) governing body for new championship titles. Fuyuki had originally intended to rename the entire promotion to complete the reorientation from hardcore (FMW) to entertainment wrestling (WEW), but this plan was stopped by Arai. Eventually, both sides agreed on a new set of titles to replace the old FMW titles. As a result, from 1999 until the end of FMW in 2002, the WEW Singles Championship was the promotion's main singles title.

Later, Fuyuki founded his own promotion (also called World Entertainment Wrestling) where the title was taken over, renamed WEW Heavyweight Championship and given a new lineage. The last champion for a long time was Kintaro Kanemura, who won the title in August 2002. When WEW folded in May 2003, the title was also declared vacant, before being reactivated in September 2006 at Kanemura's Apache Pro-Wrestling Army.

In 2018, two years after Apache Army closed its doors, the title was revived in Pro-Wrestling A-Team, an offshoot founded by Tomohiko Hashimoto.

=== Takeover the Independent Tournament ===
The "Takeover the Independent Tournament" was a sixteen-man single-elimination tournament held by Apache Army between July 25, 2012 and September 21, 2012.

First Round
July 25, 2012
Tetsuhiro Kuroda	TKO
Kintaro Kanemura	7:12
July 25, 2012
Manjimaru	Pin
Tomohiko Hashimoto	4:33
July 25, 2012
Arashi	Pin
Shota	0:44
July 25, 2012
Kazushi Miyamoto	Pin
Kotaro Nasu	5:52
July 25, 2012
Takeshi Minamino	Pin
Shoichi Ishimiya	5:52
July 25, 2012
Masato Shibata	DQ
Rikiya Fudo	8:06
July 25, 2012
Hiroki	Pin
Daisaku Shimoda	13:18
July 25, 2012
Keita Yano	Pin
Kengo Nishimura	11:19

Quarter-Finals
August 28, 2012
Tetsuhiro Kuroda	Pin
Manjimaru	10:56
August 28, 2012
Arashi	TKO
Kazushi Miyamoto	11:27
August 28, 2012
Takeshi Minamino	Pin
Masato Shibata	5:42
August 28, 2012
Hiroki (Note: Hiroki's Independent World Junior Heavyweight Championship was also on the line in the match.)	Pin
Keita Yano	16:40

Semi-Finals
September 21, 2012
Tetsuhiro Kuroda	Pin
Arashi	4:20
September 21, 2012
Takeshi Minamino	Pin
HIROKI	8:40

Final
September 21, 2012
Tetsuhiro Kuroda	Sub
Takeshi Minamino	13:57

== Reigns ==
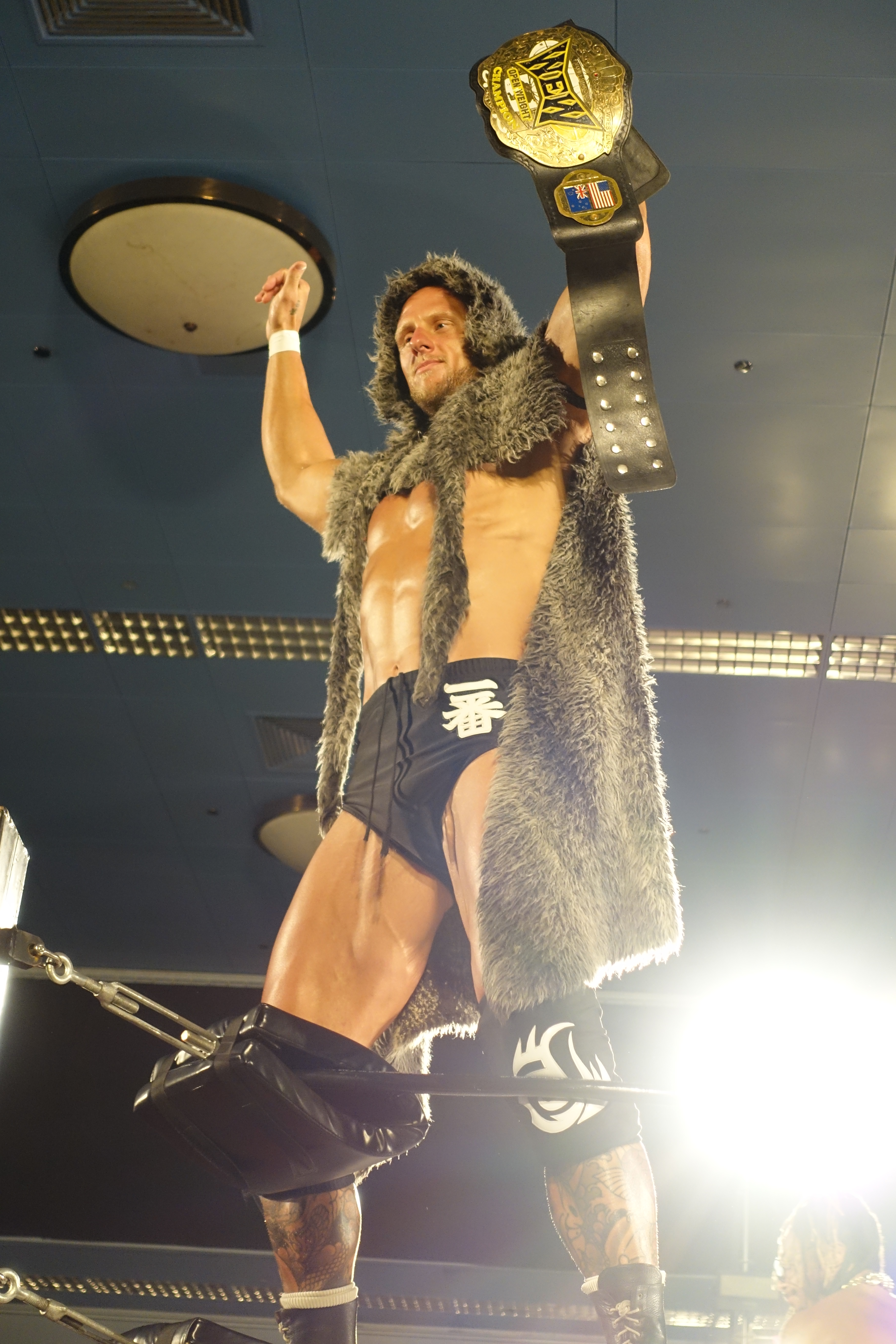
Current Champion Dylan James

As of June 25, 2025, between the two lineages, there have been 30 recognized reigns between 17 champions and two vacancies (there are 2 reigns that are not recognized by FMW). Kodo Fuyuki was the inaugural WEW Singles Champion; Kintaro Kanemura was the inaugural WEW Heavyweight Champion. Kanemura has the most reigns at six and has the longest combined reign at 1,331 days (1,335 days recognized by FMW). He also has the shortest reign at 2 days. Tomohiro Ishii's reign is the longest at 959 days. Kim Duk is the oldest champion when he won it at 70 years old, while Masato Tanaka is the youngest champion at 26 years old.

=== WEW Singles Championship ===
Key
No.	Overall reign number
Reign	Reign number for the specific champion
Days	Number of days held
Days recog.	Number of days held recognized by the promotion
†	Championship change is unrecognized by the promotion

No.	Champion	Championship change			Reign statistics			Notes	Ref.
No.	Champion	Date	Event	Location	Reign	Days	Days recog.	Notes	Ref.
Frontier Martial-Arts Wrestling (FMW)
1	Kodo Fuyuki	September 24, 1999	Making of a New Legend III	Tokyo, Japan	1	60	60	As commissioner of FMW, Kodo Fuyuki created the WEW Singles Championship and declared himself the first champion.	
2	Masato Tanaka	November 23, 1999	FMW 10th Anniversary Show	Yokohama, Japan	1	43	43	This was a Loser Leaves FMW 13,000 Volt Thunderbolt Cage Deathmatch.	
3	Tetsuhiro Kuroda	January 5, 2000	New Year Generation	Tokyo, Japan	1	117	117		
—	Vacated	May 1, 2000	—	—	—	—	—	On March 27, 2000, at Winning Road, Kuroda's second title defense against Kodo Fuyuki ended in a no contest decision after an intervention by Masato Tanaka and ECW. Dissatisfied with the decision, Kuroda decided to vacate the title on May 1.	
4	Kodo Fuyuki	May 5, 2000	Golden Series: Backdraft	Tokyo, Japan	2	331	331	Defeated Tetsuhiro Kuroda to win the vacant title.	
5	Tetsuhiro Kuroda	April 1, 2001	Fighting Creation	Tokyo, Japan	2	51	51		
6	Hayabusa	May 22, 2001	Neo FMW	Sapporo, Japan	1	81	81	This was a Barbed Wire Double Hell Landmine Deathmatch with Kodo Fuyuki as special guest referee.	
7	Kintaro Kanemura	August 11, 2001	Super Dynamism: Back Draft 2001	Tokyo, Japan	1	25	148		
†	Hayabusa	September 5, 2001	Flashover: That's Entertainment Wrestling Show #6	Sapporo, Japan	1	4	—	Defeated Kintaro Kanemura, but FMW President Yoshida awarded the title back to Kanemura four days later, claiming Hayabusa used an illegal move to win.	
†	Kintaro Kanemura	September 9, 2001	Flashover	Tokyo, Japan	1	119	—	Kanemura was awarded the title back; FMW only recognizes Kanemura's uninterrupted reign as 7th champion.	
8	Kodo Fuyuki	January 6, 2002	New Year Generation	Tokyo, Japan	3	40	40		
—	Deactivated	February 15, 2002	—	—	—	—	—	Title deactivated when FMW closed.	

=== WEW Heavyweight Championship ===
Key
No.	Overall reign number
Reign	Reign number for the specific champion
Days	Number of days held
+	Current reign is changing daily

No.	Champion	Championship change			Reign statistics		Notes	Ref.
No.	Champion	Date	Event	Location	Reign	Days	Notes	Ref.
World Entertainment Wrestling (WEW)
1	Kintaro Kanemura	August 23, 2002	Fuyuki Produce Sports Variety Show: Episode 1 Reform	Tokyo, Japan	1	255	Defeated Tetsuhiro Kuroda to revive the title as the WEW Heavyweight Championship. WEW and all subsequent promotions to feature the title consider this reign to be the first of a new lineage.	
—	Deactivated	May 5, 2003	—	—	—	—	WEW promoter Kodo Fuyuki passed away on March 19, 2003. On May 5, the promotion closed and the title was deactivated.	
Apache Pro-Wrestling Army
2	Togi Makabe	September 24, 2006	Apache Pro 3rd Anniversary Show	Tokyo, Japan	1	273	Defeated Kintaro Kanemura in a Street Fight Barbed Wire Barricade Chain Deathmatch to re-establish the title.	
3	Kintaro Kanemura	June 24, 2007	Challenge	Tokyo, Japan	2	35	This was a street fight.	
4	Toru Yano	July 29, 2007	Lock Up	Tokyo, Japan	1	56	This was a New Japan Pro-Wrestling taped show.	
5	Mammoth Sasaki	September 23, 2007	Apache	Tokyo, Japan	1	293		
6	Tomohiro Ishii	July 12, 2008	Lock Up	Tokyo, Japan	1	959	This was a New Japan Pro-Wrestling taped show.	
7	Kintaro Kanemura	February 26, 2011	House show	Tokyo, Japan	3	90		
8	Arashi	May 27, 2011	House show	Tokyo, Japan	1	335		
9	Tetsuhiro Kuroda	April 26, 2012	House show	Tokyo, Japan	1	90		
—	Vacated	July 25, 2012	—	—	—	—	Kuroda vacated the title to enter the "Takeover the Independent" tournament.	
10	Tetsuhiro Kuroda	September 21, 2012	House show	Tokyo, Japan	2	345	Defeated Takeshi Minamino in the final of the 16-man "Takeover the Independent" tournament to win the vacant title.	
11	Kintaro Kanemura	September 1, 2013	House show	Tokyo, Japan	4	805	This was a street fight.	
12	Tomohiko Hashimoto	November 15, 2015	House show	Osaka, Japan	1	98		
13	Koji Kanemoto	February 21, 2016	House show	Osaka, Japan	1	308		
14	Kintaro Kanemura	December 25, 2016	Final Gong	Tokyo, Japan	5	2		
—	Deactivated	December 27, 2016	—	—	—	—	The title was retired when Kanemura retired and Apache Army closed.	
Pro-Wrestling A-Team
15	Daisaku Shimoda	April 13, 2018	A-Team 1st Anniversary Show	Tokyo, Japan	1	58	Defeated The Blue Shark to re-establish the title.	
16	Kim Duk	June 10, 2018	House show	Tokyo, Japan	1	223		
17	Daisaku Shimoda	January 19, 2019	House show	Tokyo, Japan	2	274		
18	Gajo	October 20, 2019	House show	Tokyo, Japan	1	56		
19	Tomohiko Hashimoto	December 15, 2019	House show	Tokyo, Japan	2	343		
20	Super Tiger (II)	November 22, 2020	2020 Final: Vol. 2	Tokyo, Japan	1	616		
21	Tomohiko Hashimoto	July 31, 2022	House show	Tokyo, Japan	3	84		
22	Dylan James	October 23, 2022	House show	Tokyo, Japan	1	910		
23	Super Tiger (II)	April 20, 2025	House show	Tokyo, Japan	2	66+		

== Combined reigns ==
As of June 25, 2025.

†	Indicates the current champion

Rank	Champion	No. of reigns	Combined days	
Rank	Champion	No. of reigns	Actual	Recognized by FMW
1	Kintaro Kanemura	6	1,331	1,335
2	Tomohiro Ishii	1	959	
3	Super Tiger (II)	1	616	
4	Tetsuhiro Kuroda	4	603	
5	Tomohiko Hashimoto	3	525	
6	Kodo Fuyuki	3	431	
7	Dylan James †	1	976+	
8	Arashi	1	335	
9	Daisaku Shimoda	2	332	
10	Koji Kanemoto	1	308	
11	Mammoth Sasaki	1	293	
12	Togi Makabe	1	273	
13	Kim Duk	1	223	
14	Hayabusa	1	85	81
15	Toru Yano	1	56	
15	Gajo	1	56	
17	Masato Tanaka	1	43	

== See also ==
- FMW Brass Knuckles Heavyweight Championship
- NWA United National Heavyweight Championship
- World Heavyweight Championship (Zero1)
- Wrestle-1 Championship
- KO-D Openweight Championship
- BJW Deathmatch Heavyweight Championship
- BJW World Strong Heavyweight Championship
- Legend Championship
