= WAR Anniversary Show =

- Promotions: Wrestle Association R
- First event: 1st Anniversary of Revolution
- Last event: 8 Years Later
- Event gimmick: The anniversary celebration of WAR and flagship event

WAR Anniversary Show was a professional wrestling event produced by the Japanese professional wrestling promotion Wrestle Association R (WAR) to commemorate the anniversary of the promotion's founding by Genichiro Tenryu in 1992. The event to celebrate its anniversary was held between 1993 and 2000.

== Dates, venues and main events ==
Event	Date	City	Venue	Attendance	Main event
1st Anniversary of Revolution	June 17, 1993	Tokyo, Japan	Nippon Budokan	14,300	Genichiro Tenryu vs. Shinya Hashimoto
2nd Anniversary of Revolution	July 17, 1994	Tokyo, Japan	Sumo Hall	11,050	Atsushi Onita, Crusher Bam Bam Bigelow and Genichiro Tenryu vs. Ashura Hara, Jinsei Shinzaki and John Tenta
3rd Anniversary Show	July 7, 1995	Tokyo, Japan	Sumo Hall	9,000	Genichiro Tenryu vs. Koji Kitao
4th Anniversary Show	July 20, 1996	Tokyo, Japan	Sumo Hall	11,000	Koki Kitahara, Nobuhiko Takada and Yuhi Sano vs. Fuyuki-Gun (Hiromichi Fuyuki, Jado and Gedo) for the vacant WAR World Six-Man Tag Team Championship
5th Anniversary Show	July 6, 1997	Tokyo, Japan	Sumo Hall	6,000	Genichiro Tenryu vs. Tarzan Goto
7th Anniversary Show	June 20, 1999	Tokyo, Japan	Korakuen Hall	2,100	Genichiro Tenryu, Nobutaka Araya and Shoji Nakamaki vs. Atsushi Onita, Sambo Asako and Takashi Okamura
8 Years Later	July 13, 2000	Tokyo, Japan	Korakuen Hall	2,000	Genichiro Tenryu vs. Hayabusa

== Results ==
=== 1st Anniversary of Revolution ===
1st Anniversary of Revolution
- Promotion: Wrestling and Romance
- Date: June 17, 1993
- City: Tokyo, Japan
- Venue: Nippon Budokan
- Attendance: 14,300

WAR Anniversary Show chronology
← Previous; First	Next → 2nd Anniversary of Revolution

1st Anniversary of Revolution marked the first anniversary of Wrestling and Romance after the promotion was established in 1992. The event took place on June 17, 1993 at the Nippon Budokan in Tokyo, Japan, drawing a crowd of 14,300 people.

Results

No.	Results	Stipulations	Times
1	Black Cat and Osamu Nishimura defeated Nobukazu Hirai and Yuji Yasuraoka	Tag team match	12:08
2	Último Dragón defeated Norio Honaga	Singles match	—
3	Takashi Ishikawa defeated Masashi Aoyagi	Singles match	5:26
4	Heisei Ishingun (Kengo Kimura, Shiro Koshinaka and The Great Kabuki) defeated Raging Staff (Super Strong Machine and Tatsutoshi Goto) and Yoshiro Ito	Six-man tag team match	11:34
5	Hiroshi Hase defeated Hiromichi Fuyuki	Singles match	—
6	John Tenta and King Haku defeated The Barbarian and Tony Halme	Tag team match	15:10
7	Masahiro Chono defeated Koki Kitahara	Singles match	13:32
8	The Great Muta defeated Ashura Hara	Singles match	11:59
9	Genichiro Tenryu defeated Shinya Hashimoto	Singles match	18:23

=== 2nd Anniversary of Revolution ===
2nd Anniversary of Revolution
- Promotion: Wrestling and Romance
- Date: July 17, 1994
- City: Tokyo, Japan
- Venue: Sumo Hall
- Attendance: 11,050

WAR Anniversary Show chronology
← Previous; 1st Anniversary of Revolution	Next → 3rd Anniversary Show

2nd Anniversary of Revolution marked the second anniversary of Wrestling and Romance. The event took place on July 17, 1994 at the Sumo Hall in Tokyo, Japan, drawing a crowd of 11,050 people. The event featured a special six-man tag team tournament, in which eight six-man teams were paired in three rounds and paired Atsushi Onita and WAR owner Genichiro Tenryu in one team along with Crusher Bam Bam Bigelow, just a few months after Tenryu had beaten Onita in a no ropes barbed wire deathmatch at FMW 5th Anniversary Show.

Results

No.	Results	Stipulations	Times
1	Masanobu Kurisu defeated Yuji Yasuraoka	Singles match	12:15
2	Ashura Hara, Jinsei Shinzaki and John Tenta defeated Fuyuki-Gun (Hiromichi Fuyuki, Gedo and Jado)	Six-Man Tag Team Tournament quarter-final match	9:04
3	Koji Ishinriki, Koki Kitahara and Takashi Ishikawa defeated Akio Kobayashi, Koji Kitao and Masaaki Mochizuki	Six-Man Tag Team Tournament quarter-final match	6:37
4	Arashi, Kendo Nagasaki and Masashi Aoyagi defeated Animal Hamaguchi, Nobukazu Hirai and Shoichi Funaki	Six-Man Tag Team Tournament quarter-final match	13:23
5	Atsushi Onita, Crusher Bam Bam Bigelow and Genichiro Tenryu defeated Lionheart, Vampiro Casanova and The Warlord	Six-Man Tag Team Tournament quarter-final match	9:38
6	Ashura Hara, Jinsei Shinzaki and John Tenta defeated Koji Ishinriki, Koki Kitahara and Takashi Ishikawa	Six-Man Tag Team Tournament semi-final match	11:14
7	Atsushi Onita, Crusher Bam Bam Bigelow and Genichiro Tenryu defeated Arashi, Kendo Nagasaki and Masashi Aoyagi	Six-Man Tag Team Tournament semi-final match	10:43
8	Último Dragón (c) defeated The Great Sasuke	Singles match for the UWA World Middleweight Championship	22:23
9	Atsushi Onita, Crusher Bam Bam Bigelow and Genichiro Tenryu defeated Ashura Hara, Jinsei Shinzaki and John Tenta	Six-Man Tag Team Tournament final match	16:04
(c) / – the champion(s) heading into the match

==== Tournament bracket ====
Quarterfinals
Ashura Hara, Jinsei Shinzaki and John Tenta	Pin
Fuyuki-Gun (Hiromichi Fuyuki, Gedo and Jado)	12:15
Koji Ishinriki, Koki Kitahara and Takashi Ishikawa	Pin
Akio Kobayashi, Koji Kitao and Masaaki Mochizuki	6:37
Arashi, Kendo Nagasaki and Masashi Aoyagi	Pin
Animal Hamaguchi, Nobukazu Hirai and Shoichi Funaki	13:23
Atsushi Onita, Crusher Bam Bam Bigelow and Genichiro Tenryu	Pin
Lionheart, Vampiro Casanova and The Warlord	9:38

Semifinals
Ashura Hara, Jinsei Shinzaki and John Tenta	Pin
Koji Ishinriki, Koki Kitahara and Takashi Ishikawa	11:14
Arashi, Kendo Nagasaki and Masashi Aoyagi	Pin
Atsushi Onita, Crusher Bam Bam Bigelow and Genichiro Tenryu	10:43

Finals
Ashura Hara, Jinsei Shinzaki and John Tenta	Pin
Atsushi Onita, Crusher Bam Bam Bigelow and Genichiro Tenryu	16:04

=== 3rd Anniversary Show ===
3rd Anniversary Show
- Promotion: Wrestling and Romance
- Date: July 7, 1995
- City: Tokyo, Japan
- Venue: Sumo Hall
- Attendance: 9,000

WAR Anniversary Show chronology
← Previous; 2nd Anniversary of Revolution	Next → 4th Anniversary Show

3rd Anniversary Show took place on July 7, 1995 at the Sumo Hall in Tokyo, Japan.

Results

No.	Results	Stipulations	Times
1	Hiroshi Itakura, Osamu Tachihikari and Yuji Yasuraoka defeated Fukumen Taro, Kamikaze and Masayoshi Motegi	Six-man tag team match	—
2	Nobutaka Araya defeated Nobukazu Hirai via submission	Singles match	—
3	Koki Kitahara defeated Arashi	Singles match	—
4	Lionheart (c) defeated Último Dragón	Singles match for the WAR International Junior Heavyweight Championship	19:59
5	Bob Backlund, Jimmy Snuka and Mil Mascaras defeated Hector Garza and The Eliminators (John Kronus and Perry Saturn)	Six-man tag team match	18:08
6	Mr. Gannosuke and Tarzan Goto defeated Fuyuki-Gun (Jado and Gedo)	Tag team match	22:57
7	Animal Hamaguchi and Riki Choshu defeated Masao Orihara and Tatsutoshi Goto	Tag team match	8:55
8	Shiro Koshinaka defeated Hiromichi Fuyuki via submission	Singles match	18:55
9	Genichiro Tenryu defeated Koji Kitao in round 4	Ten-round match	2:21
(c) / – the champion(s) heading into the match

=== 4th Anniversary Show ===
4th Anniversary Show
- Promotion: Wrestle Association R
- Date: July 20, 1996
- City: Tokyo, Japan
- Venue: Sumo Hall
- Attendance: 11,000

WAR Anniversary Show chronology
← Previous; 3rd Anniversary Show	Next → 5th Anniversary Show

4th Anniversary Show commemorated the fourth anniversary of WAR. The event took place on July 20, 1996 at the Sumo Hall in Tokyo, Japan. The event featured an eight-team tournament for the vacant World Six-Man Tag Team Championship, which had been vacated by previous champions Fuyuki-Gun after they vacated the title in June to participate in the tournament.

Results

No.	Results	Stipulations	Times
1	Nobukazu Hirai and Último Dragón defeated Lion Do and Ti Do	Tag team match	15:19
2	Fuyuki-Gun (Hiromichi Fuyuki, Jado and Gedo) defeated Kazuo Yamazaki, Osamu Kido and Takashi Iizuka	WAR World Six-Man Tag Team Championship tournament quarter-final match	19:21
3	Osamu Nishimura, Riki Choshu and Satoshi Kojima defeated 200% Machine, Yoji Anjo and Yoshihiro Takayama	WAR World Six-Man Tag Team Championship tournament quarter-final match	10:23
4	Arashi, John Tenta and Osamu Taitoko defeated Koji Kitao, Koki Kitahara and Masaaki Mochizuki	WAR World Six-Man Tag Team Championship tournament quarter-final match	11:46
5	Masahito Kakihara, Nobuhiko Takada and Yuhi Sano defeated Genichiro Tenryu, Nobutaka Araya and Tatsumi Fujinami via submission	WAR World Six-Man Tag Team Championship tournament quarter-final match	16:40
6	El Samurai and Jushin Thunder Liger defeated Lance Storm and Yuji Yasuraoka (c)	Tag team match for the WAR International Junior Heavyweight Tag Team Championship	15:45
7	Fuyuki-Gun defeated Osamu Nishimura, Riki Choshu and Satoshi Kojima	WAR World Six-Man Tag Team Championship tournament semi-final match	11:23
8	Masahito Kakihara, Nobuhiko Takada and Yuhi Sano defeated Arashi, John Tenta and Osamu Taitoko via submission	WAR World Six-Man Tag Team Championship tournament semi-final match	11:22
9	Rey Misterio, Jr. defeated Juventud Guerrera (c)	Singles match for the WWA World Welterweight Championship	8:36
10	Masahito Kakihara, Nobuhiko Takada and Yuhi Sano defeated Fuyuki-Gun via submission	WAR World Six-Man Tag Team Championship tournament final match	12:35
(c) / – the champion(s) heading into the match

==== Tournament bracket ====
Quarterfinals
Fuyuki-Gun (Hiromichi Fuyuki, Gedo and Jado)	Pin
Kazuo Yamazaki, Osamu Kido and Takashi Iizuka	19:21
Osamu Nishimura, Riki Choshu and Satoshi Kojima	Pin
200% Machine, Yoji Anjo and Yoshihiro Takayama	10:23
Arashi, John Tenta and Osamu Taitoko	Pin
Koji Kitao, Koki Kitahara and Masaaki Mochizuki	11:46
Masahito Kakihara, Nobuhiko Takada and Yuhi Sano	Sub
Genichiro Tenryu, Nobutaka Araya and Tatsumi Fujinami	16:40

Semifinals
Fuyuki-Gun	Pin
Osamu Nishimura, Riki Choshu and Satoshi Kojima	11:23
Arashi, John Tenta and Osamu Taitoko	Sub
Masahito Kakihara, Nobuhiko Takada and Yuhi Sano	11:22

Finals
Fuyuki-Gun	Sub
Masahito Kakihara, Nobuhiko Takada and Yuhi Sano	12:35

=== 5th Anniversary Show ===
5th Anniversary Show
- Promotion: Wrestle Association R
- Date: July 6, 1997
- City: Tokyo, Japan
- Venue: Sumo Hall
- Attendance: 6,000

WAR Anniversary Show chronology
← Previous; 4th Anniversary Show	Next → 7th Anniversary Show

5th Anniversary Show commemorated the fifth anniversary of WAR. The event took place on July 6, 1997 at the Sumo Hall in Tokyo, Japan. The show was headlined by a main event between Genichiro Tenryu and Tarzan Goto, which Tenryu won. A match was held for the vacant World Six-Man Tag Team Championship at the event, in which Koki Kitahara, Lance Storm and Nobutaka Araya defeated Mitsuharu Kitao, Nobukazu Hirai and Tommy Dreamer to capture the vacant title. The event was televised on Samurai! TV.

Results

No.	Results	Stipulations	Times
1	Shigeo Okumura, Shoichi Ichimiya and Tomohiro Ishii defeated Masaaki Mochizuki, Takashi Okamura and Yoshikazu Taru	Six-man tag team match	13:49
2	Ryo Miyake defeated Battle Ranger	Singles match	7:50
3	Michiko Omukai and Rumi Kazama defeated Eagle Sawai and Sayuri Okino	Tag team match	13:32
4	Kishin Kawabata and Takashi Ishikawa defeated Jun Kikuchi and Osamu Tachihikari	Tag team match	13:27
5	Arashi and Shinichi Nakano defeated Joel Deaton and Tatsuo Nakano	Tag team match	15:03
6	Yoshiaki Fujiwara defeated Abdullah the Butcher	Singles match	14:19
7	Yuji Yasuraoka (c) defeated Masao Orihara	Singles match for the WAR International Junior Heavyweight Championship	17:06
8	Koki Kitahara, Lance Storm and Nobutaka Araya defeated Mitsuharu Kitao, Nobukazu Hirai and Tommy Dreamer	Six-man tag team match for the vacant WAR World Six-Man Tag Team Championship	16:46
9	Genichiro Tenryu defeated Tarzan Goto	Singles match	16:59
(c) / – the champion(s) heading into the match

=== 7th Anniversary Show ===
7th Anniversary Show
- Promotion: Wrestle Association R
- Date: June 20, 1999
- City: Tokyo, Japan
- Venue: Korakuen Hall
- Attendance: 2,100

WAR Anniversary Show chronology
← Previous; 5th Anniversary Show	Next → 8 Years Later

7th Anniversary Show was the seventh anniversary event of Wrestle Association R, which took place on June 20, 1999 at the Korakuen Hall in Tokyo, Japan. This marked the first time that the event was held at the Korakuen Hall and the first time that it was held at any other venue instead of Sumo Hall, where the previous four Anniversary Show events had taken place. In the main event, Genichiro Tenryu revived his feud with Atsushi Onita as the two captained opposite teams in a Street Fight Tornado Deathmatch.

Results

No.	Results	Stipulations	Times
1	Masao Orihara defeated Tomohiro Ishii	Singles match	12:09
2	Tatsumi Kitahara defeated Ni Hao via submission	Singles match	6:05
3	Ryuma Go defeated Thunder Warrior Alpha via submission	Singles match	7:42
4	Genichiro Tenryu and Magnum Tokyo defeated Nobutaka Araya and Sumo Fuji	Tag team match	5:35
5	Arashi and Osamu Tachihikari defeated Daikokubo Benkei and Ichiro Yaguchi	Tag team match	12:42
6	Naohiro Hoshikawa and Super Delfin defeated Masaaki Mochizuki and Yuji Yasuraoka	Tag team match	17:39
7	Masaaki Mochizuki defeated Yuji Yasuraoka	Singles match	4:31
8	Genichiro Tenryu, Nobutaka Araya and Shoji Nakamaki defeated Atsushi Onita, Sambo Asako and Takashi Okamura	Street Fight Tornado Deathmatch	12:52

=== 8 Years Later ===
8 Years Later
- Promotion: Wrestle Association R
- Date: July 13, 2000
- City: Tokyo, Japan
- Venue: Korakuen Hall
- Attendance: 2,000

WAR Anniversary Show chronology
← Previous; 7th Anniversary Show	Next → Last

8 Years Later marked the eighth anniversary of Wrestle Association R and was the final event of the promotion before Genichiro Tenryu closed it down to return to All Japan Pro Wrestling (AJPW). The event took place on July 13, 2000 at the Korakuen Hall in Tokyo, Japan and was headlined by an interpromotional match in which Tenryu took on Frontier Martial-Arts Wrestling wrestler Hayabusa.

Results

No.	Results	Stipulations	Times
1	Osamu Tachihikari defeated Nobukazu Hirai	Singles match	8:22
2	TARU defeated Stalker Ichikawa	Singles match	12:25
3	Shoji Nakamaki defeated Mitsunobu Kikuzawa	Singles match	5:40
4	Keiko Aono and Shinobu Kandori defeated Harley Saito and Noriyo Tateno	Tag team match	11:04
5	Masaaki Mochizuki defeated Tomohiro Ishii	Singles match	14:24
6	Crazy MAX (CIMA, Sumo Dandy Fuji 2000 and SUWA) defeated Dragon Kid, Genki Horiguchi and SAITO	Six-man tag team match	17:21
7	Koki Kitahara defeated Nobutaka Araya	Singles match	10:54
8	Genichiro Tenryu defeated Hayabusa	Singles match	12:44
