= Fuyuki-Gun =

Professional wrestling stable

Fuyuki-gun

Stable
- Members: See below
- Name(s): Fuyuki-gun; Shin Fuyuki-gun
- Debut: April 26, 1994 (Fuyuki-Gun); May 28, 2000 (Shin Fuyuki-Gun)
- Disbanded: November 23, 1999 (Fuyuki-Gun); January 7, 2001 (Shin Fuyuki-Gun)

Fuyuki-gun (Japanese: 冬木軍, English: Fuyuki Army) was the name of Japanese professional wrestling stables led by Hiromichi Fuyuki in Frontier Martial-Arts Wrestling (FMW) and Wrestle Association R (WAR) during the 1990s. Fuyuki-gun was originally founded by Fuyuki in WAR in 1994 and they became the first WAR World Six-Man Tag Team Champions, winning the title a record five times. They left WAR in 1996 and competed as freelancers before being signed by FMW to a full-time contract, where they held the FMW World Street Fight 6-Man Tag Team Championship. The group would merge with the trio of Mr. Gannosuke, Yukihiro Kanemura and Hido to form Team No Respect. Fuyuki-Gun disbanded after Fuyuki left FMW (kayfabe) due to losing a match to Masato Tanaka at the 10th Anniversary Show. Fuyuki formed a new offshoot group called "Shin Fuyuki-Gun" (New Fuyuki Army) which lasted until 2001.

== History ==
=== WAR (1994–1996) ===
Hiromichi Fuyuki had been wrestling in Wrestle Association R (WAR) since 1992 and took Jado and Gedo, who just joined WAR after their home promotion, W*ING, folded, under his wing to form the villainous stable Fuyuki-gun and became the lead villain of the company. The group competed in its first match as a team on April 26, 1994 by defeating Genichiro Tenryu, Koki Kitahara and Takashi Ishikawa and quickly became the lead villains of the company. Shortly after their debut as a team, Fuyuki-gun debuted for Frontier Martial-Arts Wrestling (FMW) at the 5th Anniversary Show by losing to Team Canada's Big Titan, The Gladiator and Ricky Fuji. Fuyuki-gun lost to the team of Genichiro Tenryu, Animal Hamaguchi and Koki Kitahara in the main event of the Live War Rise event on June 6. The group went on a brief hiatus as Fuyuki went to Mexico to work a few matches with Consejo Mundial de Lucha Libre (CMLL). Fuyuki-gun returned to WAR on June 30 by defeating Hideo Takayama, Hiroshi Itakura and Ichiro Yaguchi in the quarter-final, Brett Como, Lionheart and Dos Caras in the semi-final and Genichiro Tenryu, Animal Hamaguchi and Koti Kitahara in a one-night tournament to become the promotion's first World Six-Man Tag Team Champions. They participated in a Six-Man Tag Team Tournament at the 2nd Anniversary Show, where they lost to Ashura Hara, Jinsei Shinzaki and John Tenta in the quarter-final.

Fuyuki-gun lost the World Six-Man Tag Team Championship to Bob Backlund, Scott Putski and The Warlord in their first title defense on August 26, only to regain it in a rematch on September 1. On September 29, Fuyuki lost a hair vs. hair match to Tenryu, which stipulated that upon losing Fuyuki would have to ride the Sumida River or Jado and Gedo would have to get their heads shaved. Fuyuki forcibly cut the hair of Jado and Gedo. Fuyuki-gun retained the title against Bob Backlund, Dos Caras and Vampiro Canadiense in their first title defense on October 11. On November 8, Fuyuki-gun retained the title against Genichiro Tenryu, Animal Hamaguchi and Koki Kitahara in a lengthy match which went for nearly forty-three minutes. On January 8, 1995, Fuyuki-gun lost the title to Heisei Ishingun members Shiro Koshinaka, Tatsutoshi Goto and Michiyoshi Ohara. As a result, Fuyuki-gun began a feud with Heisei Ishingun and Fuyuki battled the group's leader Koshinaka in a losing effort at 3rd Anniversary Show.

On August 5, Fuyuki-gun defeated Animal Hamaguchi, Koki Kitahara and Genichiro Tenryu to win their third World Six-Man Tag Team Championship. They lost the title to Arashi, Nobutaka Araya and Koti Kitahara on October 4. Fuyuki-gun defeated the trio in a rematch to regain the title on March 22, 1996. They lost the title to Golden Cups (Youji Anjoh, Yoshihiro Takayama and Kenichi Yamamoto) on May 26. On June 7, Fuyuki-gun defeated Golden Cups in a rematch to win their record-setting fifth World Six-Man Tag Team Championship. The title would be vacated on June 19 to be defended in a tournament at 4th Anniversary Show on July 20. Fuyuki-gun made it to the finals of the tournament by defeating Kazuo Yamazaki, Osamu Kido and Takashi Iizuka in the quarter-final and Riki Choshu, Satoshi Kojima and Osamu Nishimura in the semi-final but ended up losing to Masahito Kakihara, Yuuhi Sano and Nobuhiko Takada in the final. In July 1996, Lionheart, who joined the group in November 1994, left WAR as he signed with WCW, while the remaining members of Fuyuki-gun left WAR in October and became freelancers on the Japanese independent circuit.

=== Freelance (1996–1997) ===
After quitting WAR, Fuyuki-gun began freelancing in various Japanese promotions. They debuted for Tokyo Pro Wrestling (TPW) on December 7 by defeating Takashi Ishikawa, The Great Kabuki and Daikokubo Benkei. They made their debut for International Wrestling Association on their television show on March 9, 1997 by picking a win over Daikokubo Benkei, Katsumi Hirano and Leatherface. Fuyuki began promoting his own shows as well under the "Fuyuki Army" banner beginning with the Samurai TV airing on April 28. They also began wrestling for Frontier Martial-Arts Wrestling (FMW), which would become their home promotion. They made their debut for Big Japan Pro Wrestling (BJW) on July 23 and continued to tour with BJW and IWA Japan while running their own Fuyuki Army shows as well with FMW lending its talent and financial support to their shows.

=== Frontier Martial Arts-Wrestling ===
==== World Street Fight 6-Man Tag Team Champions (1997) ====
Fuyuki-Gun debuted for FMW on February 19 by defeating W*ING's W*ING Kanemura, Dragon Winger and Hideki Hosaka. They returned to FMW on March 14 by picking another win over W*ING. A week later, Fuyuki-Gun began feuding with Funk Masters of Wrestling by defeating the group's members Hisakatsu Oya and The Headhunters to win the World Street Fight 6-Man Tag Team Championship. Fuyuki-Gun defeated the trio in a street fight at 8th Anniversary Show. They defended the title on their own Fuyuki Army shows before it was vacated on July 8 to be defended in a tournament. Fuyuki-Gun participated in the tournament, beating Eagle Sawai, Lioness Asuka and Shark Tsuchiya in the quarter-final and Daikokubo Benkei, Keisuke Yamada and The Great Kabuki in the semi-final but lost to Funk Masters of Wrestling's Mr. Gannosuke, Hisakatsu Oya and The Gladiator on August 5.

Fuyuki-Gun continued their freelancing after Fuyuki was forced to leave FMW after losing a match to Funk Masters of Wrestling leader Terry Funk at Kawasaki Legend. However, Fuyuki-Gun returned to FMW to work full-time for the promotion on November 15. The group began feuding with Atsushi Onita's ZEN due to Fuyuki's hatred with Onita. On December 5, Fuyuki-Gun defeated Onita's alter ego The Great Nita, Yukihiro Kanemura and Hido.

==== Team No Respect (1998–1999) ====
On January 7, 1998, Fuyuki-Gun's Kodo Fuyuki and Jado joined former ZEN members Mr. Gannosuke, Yukihiro Kanemura and Hido in attacking ZEN members Atsushi Onita, Koji Nakagawa and Tetsuhiro Kuroda after the latter defeated the former. Fuyuki, Jado, Gannosuke and Kanemura merged to form Team No Respect to feud with FMW and ZEN. Gedo joined the group upon returning to FMW on February 4. Fuyuki-Gun had now been merged in TNR and the trio continued to team with each other as TNR members in various matches throughout 1998. On January 6, 1999, Fuyuki turned fan favorite for the first time by quitting villainous tactics. Jado disagreed with Fuyuki and left TNR while Gedo chose to stay in the group, leading to a feud between Jado and Gedo. The two former tag team partners met in a match on May 5, where Gedo defeated Jado. Later in the night, Fuyuki-Gun reunited as Jado re-joined TNR. Fuyuki-Gun continued teaming together as TNR members until Fuyuki was forced to leave FMW in storyline due to losing a loser leaves FMW match to Masato Tanaka at 10th Anniversary Show.

=== Shin Fuyuki-gun ===
On May 28, 2000, Koji Nakagawa turned on his Team No Respect allies Jado and Gedo during a defense of WEW 6-Man Tag Team Championship against Kodo Fuyuki, Kyoko Inoue and Chocoball Mukai by hitting Gedo in the back of the head with a title belt, allowing Fuyuki to get the easy victory. Fuyuki formed a new version of Fuyuki-gun called Shin Fuyuki-gun (English: New Fuyuki Army) with Mr. Gannosuke, Chocoball Mukai, Kyoko Inoue, Koji Nakagawa, Hideki Hosaka, Yoshinori Sasaki and Shoichi Arai. On June 16, Kintaro Kanemura ended TNR and joined Shin Fuyuki-gun. They would be based on Team No Respect as the top villainous group in FMW and mainly feuded with FMW's top wrestler H. Nakagawa changed his character to "GOEMON".

On May 30, Shin Fuyuki-gun kidnapped Ricky Fuji during an autograph signing and planned to blow him after Kodo Fuyuki and GOEMON's match against H and Hayabusa on June 16. H and Hayabusa won the match and then Mr. Gannosuke took Fuji away to blow him and a dynamite exploded but both wrestlers were away from the explosion. On June 26, Fuyuki, Inoue and Mukai lost the 6-Man Tag Team Championship to H, Hisakatsu Oya and Tetsuhiro Kuroda. H eventually returned as Hayabusa on July 23 and defeated Shin Fuyuki-gun in a gauntlet match to earn a title shot at Fuyuki's WEW World Heavyweight Championship and Fuyuki managed to retain the title. On September 15, Gannosuke, Fuyuki and Shinjuku Shark won the 6-Man Tag Team Championship from Hayabusa, Hisakatsu Oya and Tetsuhiro Kuroda, but lost the title to Jado, Gedo and Kaori Nakayama two days later when Nakayama pinned Fuyuki for the title. Gannosuke became upset at Fuyuki losing the title to a girl.

Fuyuki retained the World Heavyweight Championship against Hayabusa while GOEMON began feuding with Onryo. Gannosuke grew tired of FMW's sports entertainment style and attacked Shoichi Arai, forcing Arai to fire him. He became unstable and attacked Tetsuhiro Kuroda and cost him matches leading to Arai reinstating him for a match against Kuroda at Deep Throat pay-per-view, where Onryo defeated GOEMON, Kuroda defeated Gannosuke which stipulated that Gannosuke must retire if he lost and Fuyuki defeated Hayabusa to retain the World Heavyweight Championship. After the match, Hayabusa was taking time off to heal his injured elbows until Kuroda attacked him. On November 28, Kuroda and Masato Tanaka took on Fuyuki and Kanemura and Jado and Gedo in a three-way match, during which Kuroda turned on Tanaka to join Shin Fuyuki-Gun and the match was turned into a six-man tag team match, with Kuroda, Fuyuki and Kanemura gaining a win over Tanaka, Jado and Gedo. The latter would form a trio called Complete Players. The event also saw Onryo get his second consecutive win on GOEMON.

GOEMON and Onryo had a third match together on December 10, which ended in a no contest after GOEMON died during the match and was put into a casket. On December 20, GOEMON quit Shin Fuyuki-Gun by returning as Onryo's mystery partner against Azusa Kudo and Naohiko Yamazaki. On December 23, Fuyuki and Kuroda defeated Tamon Honda and Naomichi Marufuji to win the WEW World Tag Team Championship at Pro Wrestling NOAH's Great Voyage pay-per-view. On January 7, 2001, Kuroda turned on Fuyuki during a title defense against Masato Tanaka and Gedo, allowing Gedo to pin Fuyuki for the title. As a result, Fuyuki turned fan favorite to end Shin Fuyuki-Gun and begin feuding with Kuroda and his new villainous stable Team Kuroda. On April 1, Kuroda defeated Fuyuki to win the World Heavyweight Championship with the help of Mr. Gannosuke.

== Members ==
- Fuyuki-gun
  - Hiromichi / Kodo Fuyuki, leader (April 26, 1994 – November 23, 1999)
  - Jado (April 26, 1994 – January 6, 1999; May 5, 1999 – November 23, 1999)
  - Gedo (April 26, 1994 – November 23, 1999)
  - Lionheart (November 5, 1994 – July 21, 1996)
- Shin Fuyuki-gun
  - Kodo Fuyuki (May 28, 2000–January 7, 2001)
  - Mr. Gannosuke (May 28, 2000–November 12, 2000)
  - Kintaro Kanemura (May 28, 2000–January 7, 2001)
  - Kyoko Inoue (May 28, 2000–January 7, 2001)
  - Chocoball Mukai (May 28, 2000–January 7, 2001)
  - GOEMON (May 28, 2000–December 20, 2000)
  - Hideki Hosaka (May 28, 2000–January 7, 2001)
  - Yoshinori / Mammoth Sasaki (May 28, 2000–January 7, 2001)
  - Shoichi Arai (May 28, 2000–January 7, 2001)
  - Tetsuhiro Kuroda (November 12, 2000–January 7, 2001)

== Championships and accomplishments ==
- Frontier Martial-Arts Wrestling
  - FMW World Street Fight 6-Man Tag Team Championship (1 time) – Kodo Fuyuki, Jado and Gedo
  - WEW 6-Man Tag Team Championship (1 time) – Kodo Fuyuki, Kyoko Inoue and Shinjuku Shark
  - WEW Hardcore Championship (1 time) – Kintaro Kanemura
  - WEW Hardcore Tag Team Championship (2 times) – Hideki Hosaka and Yoshinori/Mammoth Sasaki
  - WEW World Heavyweight Championship (1 time) – Kodo Fuyuki
  - WEW World Tag Team Championship (2 times) – Kodo Fuyuki and Kyoko Inoue (1), Kodo Fuyuki and Tetsuhiro Kuroda (1)
- Wrestling and Romance / Wrestle Association R
  - WAR International Junior Heavyweight Championship (2 times, inaugural) – Gedo
  - WAR International Junior Heavyweight Tag Team Championship (1 time) – Gedo and Lion Do
  - WAR World Six-Man Tag Team Championship (5 times, inaugural) – Hiromichi Fuyuki, Jado and Gedo
  - WAR World Six-Man Tag Team Championship Tournament (1994) – Hiromichi Fuyuki, Jado and Gedo
  - WAR International Junior Heavyweight Championship Tournament (1995) – Gedo
  - WAR International Junior Heavyweight Tag Team Championship Tournament (1996) – Gedo and Lion Do
