= Tenryu Project WAR World 6-Man Tag Team Championship =

Professional wrestling trios tag team championship

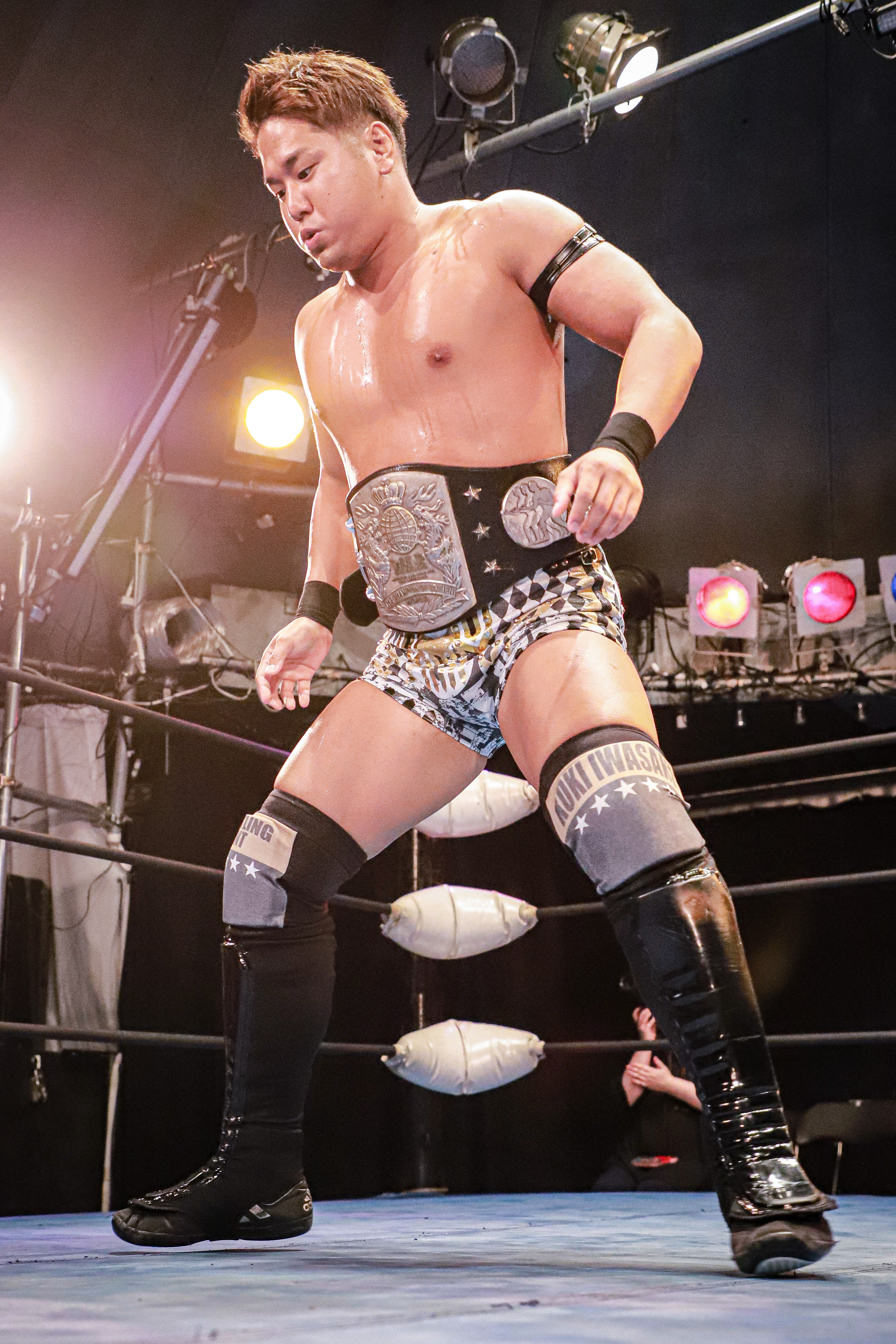
- Kouki Iwasaki with one of the title belts in July 2023

Details
- Promotion: WAR (1994–2006); Tenryu Project (2010–present)
- Date established: June 30, 1994
- Current champions: Kohei Sato, Satsuki Nagao and Takuro Niki
- Date won: October 3, 2026

Other names
- WAR World 6-Man Tag Team Championship (1994–2006); Tenryu Project World 6-Man Tag Team Championship (2010–2015); Tenryu Project WAR World 6-Man Tag Team Championship (2021–present)
Statistics
- First champions: Hiromichi Fuyuki, Gedo and Jado
- Most reigns: As a team (5 reigns): Fuyuki-gun (Hiromichi Fuyuki, Gedo and Jado); As individual (6 reigns): Hiromichi Fuyuki
- Longest reign: Genichiro Tenryu, Arashi and Tomohiro Ishii (1,216 days)
- Shortest reign: Genichiro Tenryu, Nobutaka Araya and Último Dragón (<1 day)
- Oldest champion: Don Fujii (55 years, 1 month and 10 days)

The Tenryu Project WAR World 6-Man Tag Team Championship (Japanese: 天龍プロジェクト認定WAR世界6人タッグ王座, Hepburn: Tenryū Purojekuto Nintei WAR Sekai Roku-nin Taggu Ōza) is a six-man tag team title contested for in the Japanese professional wrestling promotion Tenryu Project. The title was established in Wrestle Association R (WAR) in 1994, the first title of its kind in Japan. Since it was reestablished in 2022, the title has been defended in 2-out-of-3 falls match.

== History ==
=== Names ===
Name	Years
WAR World 6-Man Tag Team Championship	June 30, 1994–July 27, 2006
Tenryu Project World 6-Man Tag Team Championship	June 9, 2010–November 15, 2015
Tenryu Project WAR World 6-Man Tag Team Championship	July 1, 2021–present

=== Inaugural tournament ===
Genichiro Tenryu had the idea for the WAR World 6-Man Tag Team Championship from his stay in World Championship Wrestling, where he held the NWA World Six-Man Tag Team Championship with The Road Warriors during the time he elevated to the top of All Japan Pro Wrestling. On June 30, 1994, an eight-team single elimination tournament was held in Sendai to crown the inaugural champions. The tournament saw Fuyuki-gun (Hiromichi Fuyuki, Gedo and Jado) defeat Animal Hamaguchi, Genichiro Tenryu and Koki Kitahara in the final.

Quarterfinals
Fuyuki-gun (Hiromichi Fuyuki, Gedo and Jado)	N/A
Hideo Takayama, Hiroshi Itakura and Ichiro Yaguchi	N/A
Arashi, Ashura Hara and Super Strong Machine	Dec
Dos Caras, Brett Como and Lionheart	30:00
Masao Orihara, Shiryu and The Great Sasuke	N/A
Ishinriki Kōji, Masanobu Kurisu and Takashi Ishikawa	N/A
Animal Hamaguchi, Genichiro Tenryu and Koki Kitahara	N/A
Kendo Nagasaki, Kishin Kawabata and Ryo Miyake	N/A

Semifinals
Fuyuki-gun	N/A
Dos Caras, Como and Lionheart	N/A
Orihara, Shiryu and The Great Sasuke	N/A
Hamaguchi, Tenryu and Kitahara	N/A

Final
Fuyuki-gun	N/A
Hamaguchi, Tenryu and Kitahara	N/A

This title was essentially WAR's main championship, as it drew both heavyweights and junior heavyweights for competition. The promotion closed in 2000, and the title was abandoned.

=== Revivals ===
Genichiro Tenryu revived the title in 2010, for his new Tenryu Project promotion, as the Tenryu Project World 6-Man Tag Team Championship. It was disbanded when Tenryu closed the promotion after his retirement on November 15, 2015.

The title was reactivated in July 2021 as the Tenryu Project WAR World 6-Man Tag Team Championship and a four-team tournament was held between January and February 2022 to crown new champions.

First round January 9
Keita Yano, Toru and Shota	2
Mizuki Watase, Shoki Kitamura and Takuro Niki	1
Kenichiro Arai, Kohei Sato and Masayuki Kono	2
Rey Paloma, Shigehiro Irie and Jun Tonsho	0

Final; February 1
Yano, Toru and Shota	1
Arai, Sato and Kono	2

== Reigns ==
As of October 22, 2026, there have been a total of 25 reigns shared among 21 different teams consisting of 47 distinctive wrestlers. The title is currently vacant.

Key
No.	Overall reign number
Reign	Reign number for the specific team—reign numbers for the individuals are in parentheses, if different
Days	Number of days held
Defenses	Number of successful defenses
<1	Reign lasted less than a day
+	Current reign is changing daily

No.	Champion	Championship change			Reign statistics			Notes	Ref.
No.	Champion	Date	Event	Location	Reign	Days	Defenses	Notes	Ref.
Wrestle Association R (WAR)
1	Fuyuki-gun (Hiromichi Fuyuki, Jado and Gedo)	June 30, 1994	WAR	Sendai, Japan	1	57	0	Defeated Animal Hamaguchi, Koki Kitahara and Genichiro Tenryu in the finals of an eight-team tournament to become the inaugural champions.	
2	Bob Backlund, The Warlord and Scott Putski	August 26, 1994	Revolutionary Ignition '94	Yokohama, Japan	1	6	0		
3	Fuyuki-gun (Hiromichi Fuyuki, Jado and Gedo)	September 1, 1994	Revolutionary Ignition '94	Saku, Japan	2	129	3		
4	Heisei Ishingun (Shiro Koshinaka, Tatsutoshi Goto and Michiyoshi Ohara)	January 8, 1995	Early Spring Super Revolution '95	Tokyo, Japan	1	112	3		
5	Animal Hamaguchi, Genichiro Tenryu and Koki Kitahara	April 30, 1995	Warfare: Disruption	Tokyo, Japan	1	97	2		
6	Fuyuki-gun (Hiromichi Fuyuki, Jado and Gedo)	August 5, 1995	Summer Tour in R	Kagoshima, Japan	3	60	0		
7	Arashi, Koki Kitahara and Nobutaka Araya	October 4, 1995	The Restart: Restart	Hamamatsu, Japan	1 (1, 2, 1)	170	3		
8	Fuyuki-gun (Hiromichi Fuyuki, Jado and Gedo)	March 22, 1996	House show	Hamamatsu, Japan	4	65	2		
9	Golden Cups (Yoji Anjo, Yoshihiro Takayama and Kenichi Yamamoto)	May 26, 1996	The R-One Day Special	Yokohama, Japan	1	12	0		
10	Fuyuki-gun (Hiromichi Fuyuki, Jado and Gedo)	June 7, 1996	UWFi vs. WAR: Tosen!	Sapporo, Japan	5	12	1	This was a show co-produced with Union of Wrestling Forces International (UWFi).	
—	Vacated	June 19, 1996	—	—	—	—	—	Title vacated so it could be put up for grab in a tournament.	
11	Nobuhiko Takada, Yuhi Sano and Masahito Kakihara	July 20, 1996	WAR 4th Anniversary Show	Tokyo, Japan	1	83	0	Defeated Fuyuki-gun (Hiromichi Fuyuki, Gedo and Jado) in the finals of an eight-team tournament to win the vacant title.	
12	Hiromichi Fuyuki, Yoji Anjo and Bam Bam Bigelow	October 11, 1996	Osaka Crush Night!	Osaka, Japan	1 (6, 2, 1)	17	0		
13	Genichiro Tenryu, Nobutaka Araya and Último Dragón	October 28, 1996	WAR-ism '96	Osaka, Japan	1 (2, 2, 1)	<1	0		
—	Deactivated	October 28, 1996	—	—	—	—	—	Genichiro Tenryu retired the title in order to create a heavyweight title.	
14	Koki Kitahara, Nobutaka Araya and Lance Storm	July 6, 1997	WAR 5th Anniversary Show	Tokyo, Japan	1 (3, 3, 1)	113	1	Defeated Tommy Dreamer, Nobukazu Hirai and Mitsuharu Kitao to win the revived title.	
15	Mitsuharu Kitao, Nobukazu Hirai and Masaaki Mochizuki	October 27, 1997	WAR-ism '97	Isesaki, Japan	1	247	1		
—	Vacated	July 1, 1998	—	—	—	—	—	Title vacated when Mitsuharu Kitao announced his retirement from wrestling.	
—	Deactivated	July 27, 2006	—	—	—	—	—	WAR closed in 2000, and held its official final event on July 27, 2006.	
Tenryu Project
16	Tatsutoshi Goto, Yoshihiro Takayama and Daisuke Sekimoto	June 9, 2010	Next Revolution	Tokyo, Japan	1 (2, 2, 1)	112	1	Defeated Koki Kitahara, Mitsuo Momota and Genichiro Tenryu to win the revived title, now renamed Tenryu Project World 6-Man Tag Team Championship. Tenryu Project introduces the rule that any one of the champion team members can be replaced by another wrestler. Aired on tape delay on June 25, 2010.	
17	Arashi, Tomohiro Ishii and Suwama	September 29, 2010	Never So	Tokyo, Japan	1 (2, 1, 1)	268	1		
—	Vacated	June 24, 2011	—	—	—	—	—	Suwama requests Tenryu to replace him so that he can concentrate on wrestling for All Japan Pro Wrestling (AJPW).	
18	Genichiro Tenryu, Arashi and Tomohiro Ishii	June 24, 2011	—N/a	—N/a	1 (3, 3, 2)	1,216	1	Title is awarded to the team of Arashi, Tenryu and Ishii.	
—	Vacated	October 22, 2014	—	—	—	—	—	Title vacated due to inactivity.	
19	Ryuichi Kawakami, Buki and Classic Kid	December 2, 2014	Survive	Tokyo, Japan	1	270	2	Defeated Arashi, Nosawa Rongai and Ricky Fuji in the finals of a four-team tournament to win the vacant title. This was a show co-produced with VKF Pro-Wrestling. After Classic was sidelined with a neck injury in March 2015, both Heddi French and Hikaru Sato were given the role of one-off replacements, defending the title alongside Buki and Kawakami, while Classic was still recognized as one third of the official champions.	
—	Vacated	August 29, 2015	—	—	—	—	—	Title vacated when Kawakami suffered an injury.	
—	Deactivated	November 15, 2015	—	—	—	—	—	Title retired when Tenryu closed the promotion.	
—	Vacated	July 1, 2021	—	—	—	—	—	Title reactivated but left vacant when Tenryu Project was relaunched in 2021.	
20	Kenichiro Arai, Kohei Sato and Masayuki Kono	February 1, 2022	Survive the Revolution Vol. 16	Tokyo, Japan	1	504	3	Defeated Keita Yano, Toru and Shota in the finals of a four-team tournament to win the vacant title.	
21	Gaina, Kengo and Kouki Iwasaki	June 20, 2023	Still Revolution Vol. 3	Tokyo, Japan	1	119	2	This was a 2-out-of-3 falls match.	
22	Masayuki Kono, Yusuke Kodama and Kumaarashi	October 17, 2023	Still Revolution Vol. 7	Tokyo, Japan	1 (2, 1, 1)	33	0	This was a 2-out-of-3 falls match.	
23	Kazuki Hashimoto, Daichi Hashimoto and Hideyoshi Kamitani	November 19, 2023	Ryūkon Cup III: Live For Today	Tokyo, Japan	1	92	1	This was a 2-out-of-3 falls match.	
24	Minoru Suzuki, "brother" Yasshi and Kengo	February 19, 2024	Still Revolution Vol. 10	Tokyo, Japan	1 (1, 1, 2)	212	2	This was a 2-out-of-3 falls match.	
25	Shigehiro Irie, Koji Iwamoto and Kouki Iwasaki	September 18, 2024	Light My Fire Vol. 6	Tokyo, Japan	1 (1, 1, 2)	155	0	This was a 2-out-of-3 falls match.	
26	Daichi Hashimoto, Hikaru Sato and Sushi	February 20, 2025	Light My Fire Vol. 10	Tokyo, Japan	1 (2, 1, 1)	150	0	This was a 2-out-of-3 falls match.	
27	Kengo, Masayuki Kono and Yuya Susumu	July 20, 2025	Live For Today Vol. 4	Tokyo, Japan	1 (3, 3, 1)	27	0	This was a 2-out-of-3 falls match.	
28	Don Fujii, Kenichiro Arai and Yasshi	August 16, 2025	Osaka Crush Night 2025	Osaka, Japan	1 (1, 2, 2)	70	0	This was a 2-out-of-3 falls match.	
29	Kengo, Masayuki Kono and Yuya Susumu	October 25, 2025	Osaka Crush Night 2025	Osaka, Japan	2 (4, 4, 2)	305	1	This was a 2-out-of-3 falls match.	
—	Vacated	August 26, 2026	—	—	—	—	—	Title vacated due to a lack of defenses.	
30	Kohei Sato, Satsuki Nagao and Takuro Niki	October 3, 2026	IJ Tag And Six-Man Tag Title New Decision Tournaments	Tokyo, Japan	1 (2, 1, 1)	19+	0	Defeated Daichi Hashimoto, Mizuki Watase and Tatsuhito Takaiwa in the finals of a tournament to win the vacant titles.	

== Combined reigns ==
As of October 22, 2026.

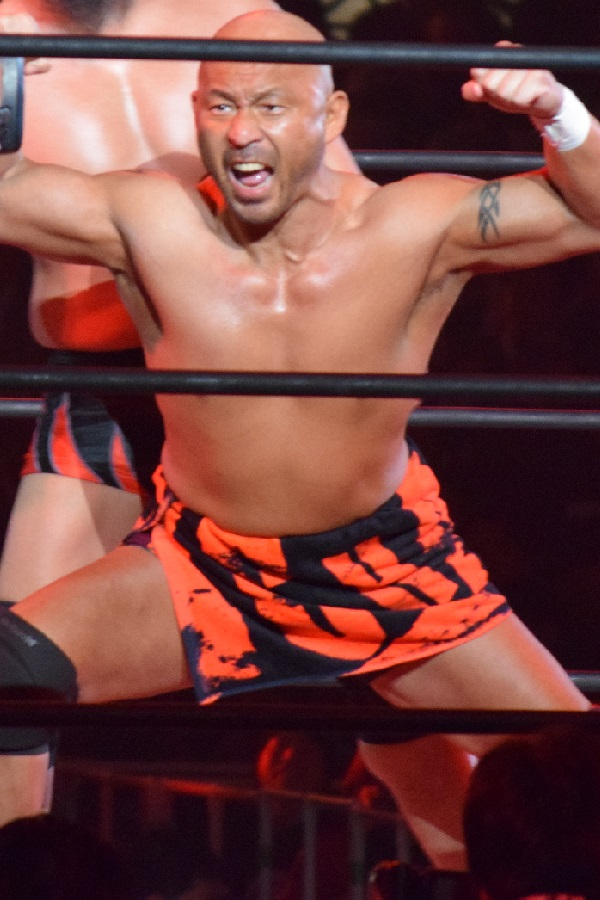
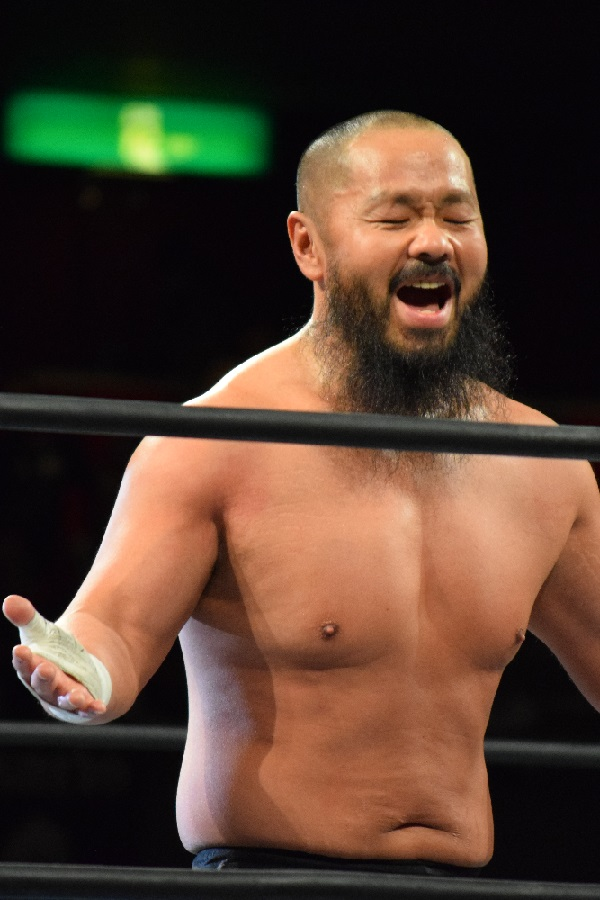
Fuyuki-gun (Hiromichi Fuyuki, Jado and Gedo), record five-time champions

†	Indicates the current champion

=== By team ===
Rank	Team	No. of reigns	Combined defenses	Combined days
1	Genichiro Tenryu, Arashi and Tomohiro Ishii	1	1	1,216
2	Kenichiro Arai, Kohei Sato and Masayuki Kono	1	3	504
3	Kengo, Masayuki Kono and Yuya Susumu	2	1	332
4	Fuyuki-gun (Hiromichi Fuyuki, Jado and Gedo)	5	6	323
5	Ryuichi Kawakami, Buki and Classic Kid	1	2	270
6	Arashi, Tomohiro Ishii and Suwama	1	1	268
7	Mitsuharu Kitao, Nobukazu Hirai and Masaaki Mochizuki	1	1	247
8	Minoru Suzuki, "brother" Yasshi and Kengo	1	2	212
9	Arashi, Koki Kitahara and Nobutaka Araya	1	3	170
10	Shigehiro Irie, Koji Iwamoto and Kouki Iwasaki	1	0	155
11	Daichi Hashimoto, Hikaru Sato and Sushi	1	0	150
12	Gaina, Kengo and Kouki Iwasaki	1	2	119
13	Koki Kitahara, Nobutaka Araya and Lance Storm	1	1	113
14	Heisei Ishingun (Shiro Koshinaka, Tatsutoshi Goto and Michiyoshi Ohara)	1	3	112
14	Tatsutoshi Goto, Yoshihiro Takayama and Daisuke Sekimoto	1	1	112
16	Animal Hamaguchi, Genichiro Tenryu and Koki Kitahara	1	2	97
17	Kazuki Hashimoto, Daichi Hashimoto and Hideyoshi Kamitani	1	1	92
18	Nobuhiko Takada, Yuhi Sano and Masahito Kakihara	1	0	83
19	Don Fujii, Kenichiro Arai and Yasshi	1	0	70
20	Masayuki Kono, Yusuke Kodama and Kumaarashi	1	0	33
21	Hiromichi Fuyuki, Yoji Anjo and Bam Bam Bigelow	1	0	17
22	Kohei Sato, Satsuki Nagao and Takuro Niki †	1	0	19+
23	Golden Cups (Yoji Anjo, Yoshihiro Takayama and Kenichi Yamamoto)	1	1	12
24	Bob Backlund, The Warlord and Scott Putski	1	0	6
25	Genichiro Tenryu, Nobutaka Araya and Último Dragón	1	0	<1

=== By wrestler ===
Rank	Wrestler	No. of reigns	Combined defenses	Combined days
1	Arashi	3	5	1,654
2	Tomohiro Ishii	2	2	1,484
3	Genichiro Tenryu	3	3	1,313
4	Masayuki Kono	4	4	869
5	Kengo	4	5	663
6	Kenichiro Arai	2	3	574
7	Kohei Sato †	2	3	523+
8	Koki Kitahara	3	6	380
9	Hiromichi Fuyuki	6	6	340
10	Yuya Susumu	2	1	332
11	Gedo	5	6	323
11	Jado	5	6	323
13	Nobutaka Araya	3	4	283
14	"brother" Yasshi/Yasshi	2	2	282
15	Kouki Iwasaki	2	2	274
16	Buki	1	2	270
16	Classic Kid	1	0	270
16	Ryuichi Kawakami	1	2	270
19	Suwama	1	1	268
20	Nobukazu Hirai	1	1	247
20	Mitsuharu Kitao	1	1	247
20	Masaaki Mochizuki	1	1	247
23	Daichi Hashimoto	2	1	242
24	Tatsutoshi Goto	2	4	224
25	Minoru Suzuki	1	2	212
26	Koji Iwamoto	1	0	155
26	Shigehiro Irie	1	0	155
28	Hikaru Sato	1	0	150
28	Sushi	1	0	150
30	Yoshihiro Takayama	2	2	124
31	Gaina	1	2	119
32	Lance Storm	1	1	113
33	Shiro Koshinaka	1	3	112
33	Michiyoshi Ohara	1	3	112
33	Daisuke Sekimoto	1	1	112
36	Animal Hamaguchi	1	2	97
37	Hideyoshi Kamitani	1	1	92
37	Kazuki Hashimoto	1	1	92
39	Masahito Kakihara	1	0	83
39	Yuhi Sano	1	0	83
39	Nobuhiko Takada	1	0	83
42	Don Fujii	1	0	70
43	Kumaarashi	1	0	33
43	Yusuke Kodama	1	0	33
45	Yoji Anjo	2	1	29
46	Bam Bam Bigelow	1	0	17
47	Satsuki Nagao †	1	0	19+
47	Takuro Niki †	1	0	19+
48	Kenichi Yamamoto	1	1	12
49	Bob Backlund	1	0	6
49	Scott Putski	1	0	6
49	The Warlord	1	0	6
52	Último Dragón	1	0	<1
