= Jado & Gedo =

Professional wrestling tag team

Tag team
- Members: Gedo; Jado
- Name(s): The World Class Tag Team; Jado & Gedo; Punish and Crush; Team No Respect
- Combined billed weight: 185 kg (408 lb)
- Debut: March 19, 1989
- Disbanded: March 13, 2022
- Years active: 1989–2022

Jado & Gedo (邪道&外道, Jadō & Gedō) were a professional wrestling tag team that currently work in New Japan Pro-Wrestling (NJPW), where they are also the head bookers. One of the most accomplished tag teams in puroresu, the team has won numerous tag team titles and six-man tag team titles in over seven promotions.

== Professional wrestling career ==
=== Debut, UWA, and W*ING (1989–1994) ===
Both Jado and Gedo debuted for NJPW on March 19, 1989. Early on, Jado used the name Punish, while Gedo used the name Crush. The two were part of the TPG (Takeshi Puroresu Gundan), until it broke up, after which the two left New Japan.

Jado and Gedo eventually joined Gran Hamada's Universal Lucha Libre (UWF) promotion, where they became the first UWA/UWF Intercontinental Tag Team Champions on November 8, 1991 by defeating Silver King and El Texano. They would hold the title for nearly eight months, before losing them to Scorpio Jr. and Shu El Guerrero on June 15, 1992. Six days later on June 21, Punish and Crush won the title back for a second time, but vacated them immediately as the two decided to split up. By 1993, UWA/UWF closed and Punish and Crush decided to go to W*ING.

After UWA/UWF closed, Punish and Crush jumped to W*ING in 1993, where Punish was able to win the W*ING/WWC Caribbean Heavyweight Championship, but their tenure proved to be short lived as W*ING closed in early 1994.

=== WAR (1994–1996) ===
After W*ING closed, Punish and Crush joined Genichiro Tenryu's WAR promotion. It was in WAR that the two started going by their more famous names, Jado and Gedo. While in WAR, the two would get their big break as they formed an alliance with Hiromichi Fuyuki called Fuyuki-Gun and would dominate WAR Six Man Tag team Division for years to come. The three would defeat Tenryu, Animal Hamaguchi and Koki Kitahara in a tournament final on June 30, 1994 to become the first WAR World Six-Man Tag Team Champions.

The three would hold the title for two months, before losing it to Bob Backlund, Scott Putski and The Warlord on August 26, 1994. Six days later, they would rebound and win the titles for a second time, holding the title for another four months before losing it on January 8, 1995. After losing the title, the team took a break with Gedo winning the WAR International Junior Heavyweight Championship on two occasions as well becoming a runner up in New Japan's 1995 Super J-Cup.

By the summer of 1995, Jado, Gedo and Fuyuki reunited and on August 5, 1995, won the Six-Man Tag Team Title for the third time by defeating Tenryu, Hamaguchi and Kitahar, a but lost the title one month later on October 4 to Kitahara, Nobutaka Araya and Arashi. On March 22, 1996, they would win the title for a fourth time in a rematch. Two months later on May 26, 1996, they would lose the title to Yoji Anjo, Yoshihiro Takayama and Kenichi Yamamoto. A few weeks later on June 7, Jado, Gedo, and Fuyuki would win the title for a fifth and final time. After the title was vacated on June 19, the three entered a tournament to win them back, but lost in the finals. After failing to regain the title, Jado and Gedo left WAR at the end of 1996.

=== Frontier Martial–Arts Wrestling (1997–2001) ===
In 1997, Jado and Gedo followed Fuyuki (now known as Kodo Fuyuki) to Frontier Martial-Arts Wrestling (FMW) and spend most of their time in Fuyuki's Team No Respect stable. Wasting no time, the three won the FMW World Street Fight 6-Man Tag Team Championship on March 21, 1997, but after four months as champions the title was vacated in July 1997. After losing the title, Jado and Gedo would be unable to win anymore championships together for the next few years (though Gedo did win the WEW Tag Team Championship with Koji Nakagawa), during this time, the team also began wrestling for All Japan Pro Wrestling, most notably participating at All Japan's first Tokyo Dome show on May 1, 1998.

In 2000, Jado and Gedo returned to title glory as they won the vacated WEW World Tag Team Championship on July 14, 2000, but lost the title two weeks later on July 28 to Pro Wrestling Noah's Masao Inoue and Yoshinobu Kanemaru. A few months later, on September 21, 2000, they would win the WEW Hardcore Tag Team Championship in a three way ladder match, but would lose those title a few weeks later on October 10, 2000, to Supreme and Homeless Jimmy. Towards the end of their tenure, Jado and Gedo formed a stable with Masato Tanaka called The Complete Players, which won the Six Man Tag Team Championship. However, ten days later, the group left FMW and were stripped of the title. Through FMW's working relationship with American promotion Extreme Championship Wrestling (ECW), Jado and Gedo worked three matches for the promotion in March 2000.

=== New Japan Pro-Wrestling (2001–2022) ===
In early 2001, Jado and Gedo eventually returned to NJPW and sided with Masahiro Chono and his Team 2000 stable. Immediately after returning to New Japan they made an impact as they defeated Jyushin Thunder Liger and El Samurai at Dome Quake on July 20, 2001 to win their first IWGP Junior Heavyweight Tag Team Championship. The two would dominate the title, holding it for over ten months and making six successful title defenses before losing it to Liger and Minoru Tanaka on May 2, 2002. For the next year and half, the team would get several shots at the title, but came up short, before finally regaining them on November 29, 2003, from Liger and Koji Kanemoto. Along with the Tag Title, Jado won the IWGP Junior Heavyweight Championship on October 13, 2003, briefly giving Jado and Gedo a monopoly on the Junior Heavyweight division. Eventually, they would lose the Jr. Tag Title on March 12, 2004, to American Dragon and Curry Man. Three months later on June 12, they would win the title back for a third time and would hold onto them for over nine months and would make five successful title defenses before eventually losing the title to Kanemoto and Wataru Inoue on March 4, 2005.

Around the time of their third reign, Jado and Gedo joined Jyushin Thunder Liger's stable CTU (Control Terrorism Unit). On July 8, 2006, Jado and Gedo would win their fourth Jr. Tag Title by defeating El Samurai and Ryusuke Taguchi. The two would hold the title for another ten months, before losing it to Taka Michinoku and Dick Togo on May 2, 2007. Following the title loss, Jado and Gedo left CTU just before it broke up and joined GBH (Great Bash Heel). Over the next few years, Jado and Gedo would eventually officially name their team The World Class Tag Team and also eventually joined GBH's splinter unit CHAOS in 2009, but despite the changes, they were unable to regain the Jr. Tag Title despite several attempts. In 2009, the team would suffer several setbacks with Gedo spending most of 2009 out with injuries, while, a few months after Gedo's return, Jado went down with injuries in early 2010 and wouldn't return until September 3, 2010. On November 13, 2010, Jado and Gedo returned to the top of New Japan's Junior Tag Team division by defeating their CHAOS team mates Davey Richards and Rocky Romero in the finals of a five-day-long tournament to win the 2010 Super J Tag League. As a result of their victory, Jado and Gedo received a match for the IWGP Junior Heavyweight Tag Team Championship, which took place at a Dramatic Dream Team (DDT) event on December 26, 2010, where they were defeated by the defending champions, the Golden☆Lovers (Kenny Omega and Kota Ibushi). On November 1, 2013, Gedo and Jado received their first shot at the IWGP Junior Heavyweight Tag Team Championship in three years, but were defeated by the defending champions, Suzuki-gun (Taichi and Taka Michinoku). Gedo and Jado's next title opportunity came on April 9, 2017, when they unsuccessfully challenged Suzuki-gun's Taichi and Yoshinobu Kanemaru at Sakura Genesis 2017.

On March 13, 2022, Evil defeated Tonga. Following this match, Evil and the rest of Bullet Club attacked G.o.D. and Jado, officially ejecting them from the group as a result, and siding with White. This would also break up Jado and Gedo's 33-year-long tenure as a tag team.

=== Pro Wrestling Noah (2016) ===
On May 28, 2016, Gedo and Jado made a surprise appearance for Pro Wrestling Noah, challenging Atsushi Kotoge and Daisuke Harada to a match for the GHC Junior Heavyweight Tag Team Championship. They received their title shot on June 12, but were defeated by Kotoge and Harada in a three-way match, also involving Taichi and Taka Michinoku. On October 8, Gedo and Jado defeated Kotoge and Harada to win the GHC Junior Heavyweight Tag Team Championship, becoming the second team (after Jyushin Thunder Liger and Tiger Mask) to hold both the IWGP and GHC titles. They lost the title back to Kotoge and Harada on December 24.

== Championships and accomplishments ==
- Big Japan Pro Wrestling
  - BJW Tag Team Championship (1 time)
- Canadian Rocky Mountain Wrestling
  - CRMW North American Mid-Heavyweight Championship (1 time) – Gedo
- Dragon Gate
  - Dragon Gate I-J Heavyweight Tag Team Championship (1 time)
- Frontier Martial-Arts Wrestling
  - WEW World Tag Team Championship (1 time)
  - WEW Hardcore Tag Team Championship (1 time)
  - FMW World Street Fight 6-Man Tag Team Championship (1 time) – with Hiromichi Fuyuki
  - WEW 6-Man Tag Team Championship (4 times) – with Koji Nakagawa (2), Kaori Nakayama (1) and Masato Tanaka (1)
- New Japan Pro-Wrestling
  - IWGP Junior Heavyweight Championship (1 time) – Jado
  - IWGP Junior Heavyweight Tag Team Championship (4 times)
  - Super J Tag League (2010)
  - DREAM* Win Jr. Tag Team Tournament (2002) – Gedo (with El Samurai)
  - IWGP Junior Heavyweight Tag Team Title Tournament (2003)
- Pro Wrestling Noah
  - GHC Junior Heavyweight Tag Team Championship (1 time)
- Tokyo Sports
  - Best Tag Team Award (2001)
- Toryumon X
  - UWA World Trios Championship (1 time) – with Katsushi Takemura
- Universal Wrestling Association
  - UWA/UWF Intercontinental Tag Team Championship (2 times)
- Wrestle Association "R"
  - WAR International Junior Heavyweight Championship (2 times) – Gedo
  - WAR World Six-Man Tag Team Championship (4 times) – with Hiromichi Fuyuki
- Wrestling International New Generations
  - W*ING/WWC Caribbean Heavyweight Championship (1 time) – Jado
- Wrestling Observer Newsletter
  - Best Bookers (2011–2014)
  - Best Booker (2016–2019) – Gedo
  - Wrestling Observer Newsletter Hall of Fame (Class of 2019) – Gedo
