= Yuji Yasuraoka =

Japanese wrestler (born 1971)

Personal information
- Born: January 28, 1971 (age 55) Yachiyo, Chiba, Japan

Professional wrestling career
- Ring name: Yuji Yasuraoka
- Billed height: 1.80 m (5 ft 11 in)
- Billed weight: 91 kg (201 lb)
- Trained by: Genichiro Tenryu; SWS Dojo
- Debut: January 4, 1992
- Retired: June 20, 1999

Yuji Yasuraoka (安良岡裕二 Yasuraoka Yuji) (born January 28, 1971) is a retired Japanese professional wrestler. He is best known for his work in Wrestle Association R, where he became a one-time Tenryu Project International Junior Heavyweight Champion and a four-time Tenryu Project International Junior Heavyweight Tag Team Champion.

== Professional wrestling career ==
=== Super World of Sports (1992) ===
Yasuraoka was trained for a professional wrestling career by Genichiro Tenryu and made his professional wrestling debut for Tenryu's promotion Super World of Sports (SWS) on January 4, 1992, by competing against Toshiyuki Nakahara in a losing effort. Yasuraoka picked up his first win of his career against Tetsuya Yamanaka on June 18. Yasuraoka competed in several matches in SWS until the promotion closed down a few months later on June 19.

=== Wrestling and Romance / Wrestle Association R ===
==== Early years (1992–1995) ====
Yasuraoka was soon hired by Tenryu for his new promotion Wrestling and Romance (WAR), which was a successor to SWS. He competed in WAR's debut show on July 14, 1992, against Nobukazu Hirai in a losing effort. He wrestled Koji Inomata in several matches during the early days of WAR including a win against Inomata at a WAR/WWF interpromotional event on September 15. Yasuraoka mainly wrestled as a junior heavyweight and lost the majority of the early matches of his career. He also made a few appearances for New Japan Pro-Wrestling during this time as a partnership between NJPW and WAR. At the promotion's 1st Anniversary of Revolution, Yasuraoka teamed with Nobukazu Hirai in a loss to Black Cat and Osamu Nishimura.

At Revolution, Yasuraoka teamed with Nobukazu Hirai to defeat Tatsuhito Takaiwa and Yuji Nagata. At Live War Rise, Yasuraoka teamed with Último Dragón to defeat the team of Arashi and Yaiba. He lost a match to Masanobu Kurisu at 2nd Anniversary of Revolution. On August 28, 1994, Yasuraoka received his first title shot against Último Dragón for the UWA World Middleweight Championship, where he failed to capture the title. He then suffered a loss against Masanobu Kurisu at Mega Power. On March 26, 1995, Yasuraoka entered a tournament to crown the inaugural International Junior Heavyweight Champion, where he lost to Gedo in the quarter-final round. At Battle Angel, Yasuraoka teamed with Último Dragón to defeat Masao Orihara and Ultimate Dragon. At 3rd Anniversary Show, Yasuraoka teamed with Hiroshi Itakura and Osamu Tachihikari to defeat Fukumen Taro, Kamikaze and Masayoshi Motegi in a six-man tag team match.

==== International Junior Heavyweight Tag Team Champion (1996–1997) ====
On February 23, 1996, Yasuraoka teamed with Lance Storm to participate in a tournament for the new International Junior Heavyweight Tag Team Championship, defeating Gran Naniwa and Masaaki Mochizuki in the semi-final before losing to Gedo and Lion Do in the final. Yasuraoka and Storm defeated Gedo and Lion Do in a rematch on March 27 to win the International Junior Heavyweight Tag Team Championship, marking Yasuraoka's first championship win of his career. After making successful title defenses against Masaaki Mochizuki and Último Dragón on May 26 and El Samurai and Norio Honaga at New Japan Pro-Wrestling's Skydiving J, Storm and Yasuraoka dropped the titles to El Samurai and Jushin Thunder Liger at 4th Anniversary Show. The following night, at Super Summer Wars, Lance Storm, Rey Misterio, Jr., Último Dragón and Yuji Yasuraoka defeated Gedo, Jushin Thunder Liger, Juventud Guerrera and Lion Do.

At Osaka Crush Night, Yasuraoka teamed with Koki Kitahara against Arashi and Masaaki Mochizuki in a losing effort. On November 9, Storm and Yasuraoka regained the International Junior Heavyweight Tag Team Championship by defeating El Samurai and Jushin Thunder Liger. The following month, at Ryogoku Crush Night, Storm and Yasuraoka made their first title defense against Tiger Mask and Masaaki Mochizuki. The duo would lose the titles to Battle Ranger and Masaaki Mochizuki on February 12, 1997. The duo received a rematch against Ranger and Mochizuki for the titles at the following month's Battle Angel, in which they lost. Shortly after, Yasuraoka had a brief stint with World Championship Wrestling (WCW), where he debuted as a villain introduced by Sonny Onoo on the May 17 episode of Saturday Night, where he defeated enhancement talent Julio Sanchez. After the match, Yasuraoka continued to assault Sanchez until Rey Misterio, Jr. made the save, leading to a match between the two at Slamboree, which Misterio won. Yasuraoka then returned to WAR.

==== International Junior Heavyweight Champion (1997–1999) ====
On June 6, 1997, Yasuraoka defeated the J-Crown Champion Jushin Thunder Liger to win the International Junior Heavyweight Championship, his first and only singles championship. Due to Yasuraoka's win the International Junior Heavyweight Championship was removed from the J-Crown Championship. Yasuraoka made his first successful title defense against Masao Orihara at 5th Anniversary Show. He then successfully defended the title against the likes of Masaaki Mochizuki and Battle Ranger. On October 12, Yasuraoka became a double champion as he teamed with Tomohiro Ishii to defeat Masashi Aoyagi and Hirofumi Miura to win the International Junior Heavyweight Tag Team Championship, beginning Yasuraoka's third reign with the title. The duo vacated the title only six days later on October 18.

In May 1998, Yasuraoka entered New Japan Pro-Wrestling's 1998 Best of the Super Juniors tournament, where he won only one match in his block against the eventual winner Koji Kanemoto, while losing the rest of his matches in the tournament. In July, Yasuraoka teamed with Kendo Kashin to participate in a round robin tournament for the new IWGP Junior Heavyweight Tag Team Championship, which they failed to win as they won only one match in the tournament against eventual winners Shinjiro Otani and Tatsuhito Takaiwa. On September 27, Yasuraoka and Yasha Kurenai entered the Mixed Tag Team Tournament, which they won by defeating Masaaki Mochizuki and Harley Saito in the quarter-final, Nobukazu Hirai and Noriyo Tateno in the semi-final and Koki Kitahara and Eagle Sawai in the final.

On January 15, 1999, Yasuraoka lost the International Junior Heavyweight Championship to Masao Orihara, ending his reign at 588 days. On March 1, Yasuraoka and Tomohiro Ishii defeated Shinjiro Otani and Tatsuhito Takaiwa to win their second International Junior Heavyweight Tag Team Championship as a team, while marking Yasuraoka's fourth tag team championship reign. At 7th Anniversary Show, Yasuraoka teamed with Masaaki Mochizuki against Naohiro Hoshikawa and Super Delfin in a losing effort. Immediately after losing, Yasuraoka competed against Mochizuki in a match, which Yasuraoka lost. This would be Yasuraoka's last match as he announced his retirement from wrestling after the match, which led Yasuraoka and Ishii to vacate the International Junior Heavyweight Tag Team Championship.

== Retirement ==
A motorcycle enthusiast before entering pro wrestling, Yasuraoka became a motorcycle mechanic after ending his wrestling career.

== Championships and accomplishments ==
- Wrestle And Romance / Wrestle Association R
  - WAR International Junior Heavyweight Championship (1 time)
  - WAR International Junior Heavyweight Tag Team Championship (4 times) – with Lance Storm (2), Tomohiro Ishii (2)
  - Mixed Tag Team Tournament (1998) - with Yasha Kurenai
