= Yuya Susumu =

Japanese professional wrestler

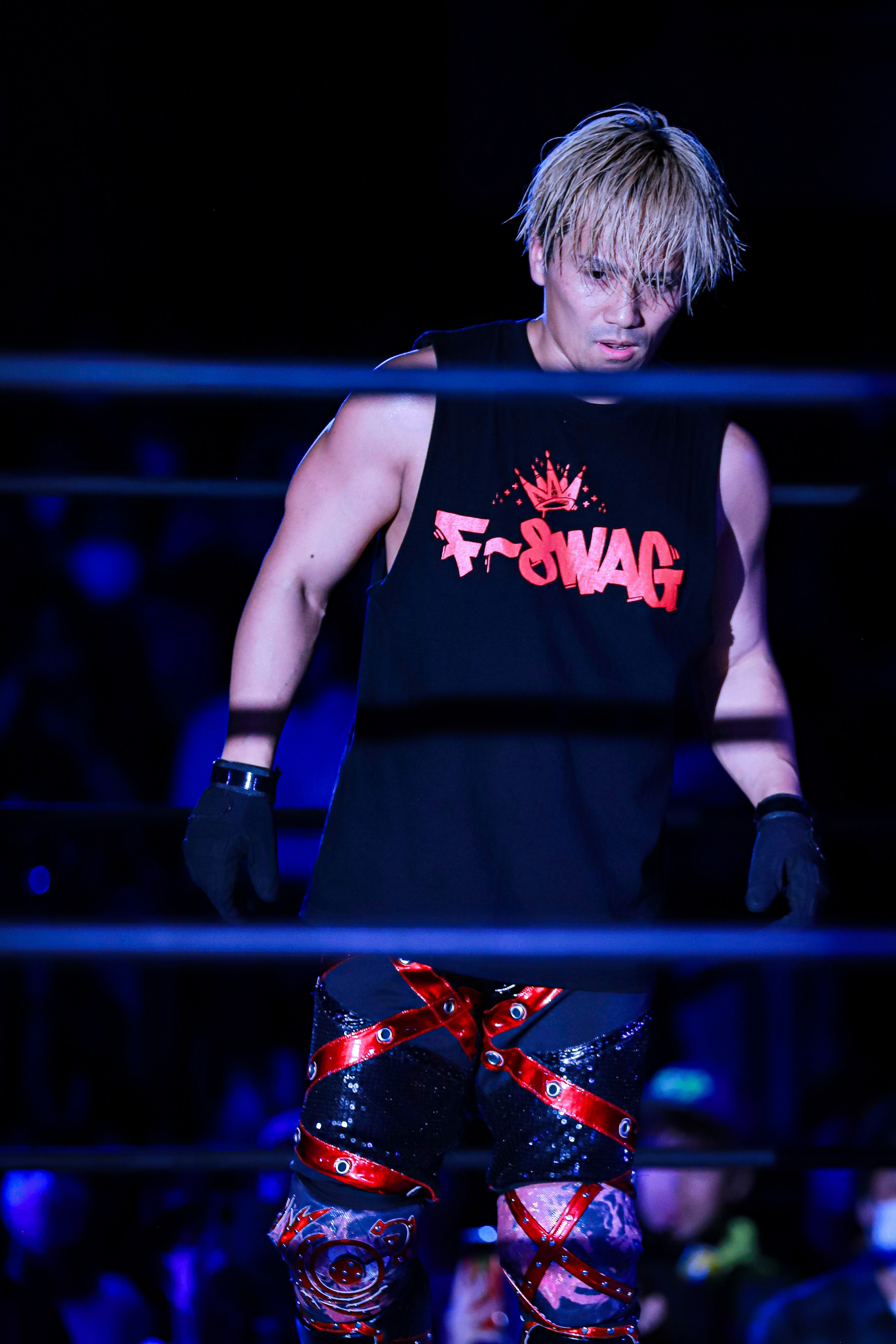
- Susumu in May 2023

Personal information
- Born: 14 January 1984 (age 42) Kasaoka, Okayama, Japan

Professional wrestling career
- Ring names: Dragon Joker; Salvahe de Oriente; Susumu; Yuya Susumu
- Billed height: 1.70 m (5 ft 7 in)
- Billed weight: 76 kg (168 lb)
- Trained by: Hanzo Nakajima
- Debut: 14 December 2003

Yuya Susumu (進祐哉, Susumu Yuya) (born 14 January 1984), previously known mononymously as Susumu (stylized in all capital letters), is a Japanese professional wrestler who currently works for Pro Wrestling Noah, where he is a former holder of the GHC Junior Heavyweight Tag Team Championship, and a former member of the Stinger stable. He is also known for his time with Wrestle Gate and Pro Wrestling Freedoms.

== Professional wrestling career ==
=== Wrestle Gate (2003–2013) ===
Susumu was born in Kasaoka, Okayama Prefecture and began his career in the neighboring prefecture Hiroshima, for local promotion Wrestle Gate. Trained by former Michinoku Pro Wrestling wrestler Hanzo Nakajima, he made his debut on 14 December 2003 teaming with Hanzo against Grappler and Yusuke Maeyama. Shortly after, he changed his ring name to Susumu (stylised as SUSUMU). On 26 December 2010, Susumu appeared on neighbouring promotion Dove Pro Wrestling's biggest show of the year, Bump Bump Revolution. He wrestled in the main event, challenging Heavyweight Champion Shoichi Uchida, and was unsuccessful. On 24 April 2011, Susumu won Wrestle Gate's 10 Minutes Battle Tournament, defeating Seiki, Betcha Hogo & Kabuki Kid in one night. Susumu would form a tag team with Seiki called Scramble☆Time, and the two defeated Hanzo & Victory Shanghai to become #1 contenders for Pro Wrestling Kageki's Hakata Tag Team Championship. They would go on to defeat Cosmo Soldier & Super Taira to win the belts and defended the belts 4 times before losing them to Hanzo & Victory Shanghai. Susumu's last match at Wrestle Gate was a loss teaming with Betcha Hogo against Sakigake & Souther.

=== Pro Wrestling Freedoms (2010–2022) ===
Susumu made his first appearance for Freedoms on 23 November 2010 teaming with Onryo to defeat Madoka & Ricky Fuji. He made sporadic appearances for the next couple of years before facing deathmatch wrestler Yuko Miyamoto in a Street Fight on Christmas Day 2012, resulting in a loss. Susumu was signed to Freedoms on 2 May 2013. On 23 March 2015, Susumu teamed up with Buffalo to defeat Gentaro & Kenichiro Arai for the King of Freedom Tag Team Championship, after Susumu submitted Arai with a Cross armbar. Susumu then announced he would be going back to his real name, Yuya Susumu. After one successful defence against Hi69 & Tatsuhito Takaiwa, they lost the belts to Mammoth Sasaki & Kamui after Mammoth pinned Susumu. Susumu participating in a 1-day #1 contender's tournament for the King of Freedom World Championship. He submitted Toru Sugiura in the semi-finals, and scored a referee stop on Kenji Fukumoto to win the tournament, and earn the right to challenge Masashi Takeda. Susumu was unsuccessful in his challenge, being submitted with an Ankle Hold. On 15 September 2016, Susumu and Hayata defeated Gentaro & The Winger for win the King of Freedom Tag Team Championship, after Hayata hit the Headache on Gentaro. They successfully defended 4 times before losing the belts to The Brahman Brothers on 19 February 2017, after Brahman Shu pinned Hayata. On 2 May, Susumu won his first singles title, defeating Gentaro for the UWA World Junior Heavyweight Championship, submitting him with a Cross Face Lock. Susumu defended against Psycho, Rey Paloma, Masamune, Kamui & Kenshin Chikano before losing the belt to "brother" Yasshi after a German Suplex on 2 May 2018, exactly 1 year after he won the belt. 4 months later, Susumu won the belt back from Yasshi with an Avalanche Falcon Arrow. After one successful defence against Shuichiro Katsumata, he lost the belt to Kenichiro Arai.

On 12 September 2018, Scramble☆Time faced off in a singles match in the main event of a J-Stage event, with Seiki (now known as Seiki Yoshioka) defeating Susumu. Susumu won the UWA World Junior Heavyweight Championship back from Kenichiro Arai on 1 October 2019, defeating him with the Front Crush. His 3rd and so far final reign with the belt included successful defences against Naoki Tanizaki, Shuichiro Katsumata & Kengo before losing the belt to Kamui on 31 August 2020 after a Firebird Splash. Susumu unsuccessfully challenged for the belt on 17 November 2021 against Tatsuhito Takaiwa. On 2 March 2022, Susumu unsuccessfully challenged for the King of Freedom World Tag Team Championship with Kengo against Toru Sugiura and Tomoya Hirata when Hirata pinned Susumu.

On 18 March 2022, Freedoms announced that Susumu would be parting ways with them after March. His final match will be on the 29th in Korakuen Hall teaming with Toru Sugiura & Tomoya Hirata to take on Takashi Sasaki, Mammoth Sasaki & Dragon Libre.

=== Tenryu Project (2012–2015, 2020–present) ===
On 27 July 2012, Susumu was announced to be appearing on Tenryu Project events under a mask with the name Dragon Joker (stylised as Dragon JOKER). Joker defeated Kengo Nishimura in just 3 minutes on 26 September in Korakuen Hall. On 4 March 2014, Joker competed for the vacant UWA World Junior Heavyweight Championship, but lost to Kengo after he executed a Frankensteiner. He then challenged Kengo 2 months later in an empty arena, but lost after a Frog splash. From June to October 2014, Joker entered a tag tournament where the participant's tag partners would change with each match. Joker reached the final and faced Ryuichi Kawakami, who had Yoshihiro Takayama as his tag partner. Joker had chosen Zero1's Shinjiro Otani as his partner, but unfortunately the duo lost after Kawakami pinned Joker. Genichiro Tenryu, owner and promoter of Tenryu Project announced his retirement tour in 2015. On this tour, Joker: suffered losses to Buki and Yoshinari Ogawa; defeated Buki; won a tag match against Voodoo Murders' Taru & "brother" Yasshi teaming with Kazuaki Mihara; defeated Kotaro Nasu and then lost to Koraro Nasu for the vacant UWA World Junior Heavyweight Championship. Joker's final match was at Tenryu's retirement event at Ryōgoku Kokugikan. Joker teamed up with Jyushin Thunder Liger, Ryota Chikuzen & Shigeno Shima in an unsuccessful effort against Fujita, Kuuga, Taru & Yasu Kubota, after Fujita defeated Joker. After the match, Joker unmasked, revealing himself to be Yuya Susumu, and retiring the Dragon Joker character.

On 15 November 2020, Tenryu Project was revived without Tenryu as an active wrestler. Susumu wrestled on the first card, under his real name. He teamed with Hideki Suzuki to defeat Masayuki Kono & Kotaro Nasu. On 25 November 2021, Tenryu Project would hold an empty arena event co-produced with Vamostar. In the main event, Vamostar faced Tenryu Project in a 2-out-of-3 Falls match. Vamostar's Masayuki Kono, Yusuke Kodama, Andy Wu & Jun Tonsho defeated Tenryu Project's Susumu, Keita Yano, Toru & Kengo 2-1.

=== Pro Wrestling Noah (2020–2022) ===
On 22 November 2020, a mysterious character by the name of Salvahe de Oriente appeared in Pro Wrestling Noah, allied with Kotaro Suzuki. They teamed up to defeat Kongo's Haoh & Tadasuke, with Oriente defeating Haoh. on 6 December, the two challenged Stinger's Hayata & Yoshinari Ogawa for the GHC Junior Heavyweight Tag Team Championship, but halfway through the match Oriente turned on Kotaro, allowing Stinger to retain. Oriente then unmasked, revealing himself to be Yuya Susumu, and joined Stinger. Nosawa Rongai & a masked wrestler then appeared to ally with Kotaro, building a feud. At The Gift 2020 in Nagoya, Susumu faced Kotaro in a singles match. After just 4 minutes, the match was ruled a no-contest due to outside interference. It was then contested as a 6-man tag with Stinger vs Kotaro, Nosawa & their masked accomplice, but that match only lasted 2 minutes before being thrown out. The feud continued in 2021, with Nosawa's masked ally being revealed to be Ikuto Hidaka. The two teams faced off at Higher Ground 2021 on 31 January in Korakuen Hall, with Stinger getting the win after Hayata pinned Kotaro. Susumu scored his first big win in Noah after submitting Hajime Ohara with his Cross Face Lock at The Infinity 2021 in Korakuen Hall. The feud between Stinger and Nosawa's Alliance continued in April with Susumu teaming up with Ogawa to face Hidaka & Kotaro. The match ended in a DQ when Hayata interfered. At Neo Breeze 2021 in Korakuen Hall, the two trios faced off. Susumu won when Nosawa hit him with a low blow. Susumu faced Kotaro one-on-one at Noah The Glory 2021 at Nagoya Congress Center Event Hall, and it ended in a double-pinfall.

At All Out Attack 2021, Susumu submitted GHC Junior Heavyweight Champion Atsushi Kotoge in a tag team match with the Cross Face Lock. This earned him a shot at the championship. At the Mitsuharu Misawa Memorial 2021 event, Susumu unsuccessfully challenged Kotoge for the championship, being pinned after a Killswitch. Susumu participated in the 2021 Jr. Rumble, and reignited the rivalry with Nosawa's Alliance, now named Perros del Mal de Japon. Susumu pinned Hidaka before being pinned by Tadasuke just 30 seconds later. During this time, both units had added a 4th member. Perros added Yo-Hey while Susumu's Stinger had added Susmu's old tag partner, Seiki Yoshioka. The two units fought at Up to Emotion 2021 with the two teams scoring a win each. Hayata, Yoshioka & Susumu defeated Perros's Nosawa, Yo-Hey & Hidaka at Cross Over 2021 in Sendai, after Yoshioka pinned Yo-Hey. On 23 July, Susumu faced Daisuke Harada in a singles match, which Harada won. Stinger competed in the Jr. Team Game 2021 being eliminated by Seiki gun in the first round.

On 1 August at Cross Over 2021 in Hiroshima, Scramble☆Time won the GHC Junior Heavyweight Tag Team Championship for the first time, defeating Daisuke Harada and Hajime Ohara. They'd defend the belts at Kawasaki Go! against Kongo's Aleja & Tadasuke before losing them to Atsushi Kotoge & Hajime Ohara at the N-1 Victory 2021 opening event. On 7 December, the Stinger vs Perros feud was again reignited, with Perros adding Dragon Gate's Eita to their ranks. Eita & Nosawa defeated Scramble☆Time at Man Crush 2021 after Eita pinned Susumu in just 5 minutes. On 5 January 2022, Perros' new addition Super Crazy, pinned Susumu in an 8-man tag match. Stinger got one up on Perros the next night when Scramble☆Time defeated Yo-Hey & Kotaro in an N Innovation U-Cup 2022 match. Later that night, Susumu participated in the 2022 Jr. Rumble, being eliminated by Atsushi Kotoge. At Higher Ground 2022, Scramble☆Time won the GHC Junior Heavyweight Tag Team Championship for the second time, defeating Atsushi Kotoge & Hajime Ohara for the vacant titles when Susumu submitted Ohara with the Cross Face Lock. 5 days later in Korakuen Hall, Perros would defeats Stinger in an 8-man tag match when Yo-Hey pinned Susumu. Yo-Hey and Nosawa then challenged Scramble☆Time for their tag titles. On 17 February, Susumu defeated Yo-Hey in a singles match with the Front Crush.

After Yoshioka suffered an injury, Scramble☆Time had to vacate their titles. Susumu teamed with Hayata to regain the titles against Nosawa & Yo-Hey, but Yo-Hey was kicked out of Perros. Yo-Hey, then chose Atsushi Kotoge as his tag team partner. Stinger were defeated by Kotoge & Yo-Hey, making them unable to regain the tag belts.

== Championships and accomplishments ==
- Dragon Gate
  - Open the Triangle Gate Championship (1 time) – with Seiki Yoshioka and Yoshinari Ogawa
- Ganbare Pro-Wrestling
  - Spirit of Ganbare World Tag Team Championship (1 time, current) – with Shuichiro Katsumura
- Pro Wrestling Kageki
  - Hakata Tag Team Championship (1 time) – with Seiki
- Pro Wrestling Freedoms
  - King of Freedom World Junior Heavyweight Championship (2 times, current)
  - King of Freedom World Tag Team Championship (2 times) – with Buffalo (1) and Hayata (1)
  - UWA World Junior Heavyweight Championship (3 times)
- Pro Wrestling Noah
  - GHC Junior Heavyweight Tag Team Championship (2 times) – with Seiki Yoshioka
- Tenryu Project
  - Tenryu Project International Junior Heavyweight Championship (1 time)
  - International Junior Heavyweight Tag Team Championship (2 times) – with Keita Yano (1) and Kengo (1)
  - Tenryu Project World 6-Man Tag Team Championship (2 times) — with Masayuki Kono and Kengo
