= Masashi Aoyagi =

Japanese professional wrestler (1956–2022)

Personal information
- Born: 27 December 1956 Kasuya District, Fukuoka, Japan
- Died: 6 July 2022 (aged 65)

Professional wrestling career
- Ring names: Masashi Aoyagi; Seiji Aoyagi
- Billed height: 1.72 m (5 ft 7 1/2 in)
- Billed weight: 93 kg (205 lb)
- Debut: 6 October 1989
- Retired: 15 August 2021

Masashi Aoyagi (Japanese: 青柳 政司, Hepburn: Aoyagi Masashi; 27 December 1956 – 6 July 2022) was a Japanese professional wrestler and karateka. He worked for numerous Japanese promotions such as Frontier Martial-Arts Wrestling, New Japan Pro Wrestling and Pro Wrestling NOAH.

== Early life ==
Aoyagi was born into a family of coal miners in Kasuya District, Fukuoka, and raised in Toyota, Aichi, after his father lost his job due to the energy revolution. He was a swimmer while he was in elementary and junior high school, and was occasionally selected as a representative of the prefectural convention.

After moving to Aichi, Aoyagi became increasingly exposed to the local martial arts culture, which was especially active in the region during the 1960s and 1970s. Although swimming was his primary sport, he developed an early fascination with combat sports and frequently attended regional martial arts exhibitions. This interest would later influence his transition from athletics to karate training.

== Karate career ==
Although he aspired to become a professional wrestler in middle school, a lack of wrestlers shorter than 180 cm at the time discouraged him. He entered Chukyo High School on a swimming scholarship but dropped out after three months due to financial difficulties. While working for a transportation company, he discovered a nearby Shitō-ryū karate dojo and began training in karate.

He went on to win several tournaments in the Tōkai region and, in 1978, at age 22, participated in the10th Open Tournament All Japan Karate Championship organized by Kyokushin Kaikan, where he reached the top 16. The following year, he quit his job and moved to Tokyo to join Kyokushin Kaikan but left after six months. Returning to his hometown, he founded Seishin Kaikan with his former students and continued competing in tournaments such as those hosted by Seidokaikan.

== Professional wrestling career ==
Aoyagi started his professional wrestling debut in 1989. Early in his career Aoyagi worked for Wrestle Association-R from 1992 to 1994 and 1997 to 1998, Frontier Martial-Arts Wrestling from 1989 to 1994, and New Japan Pro Wrestling from 1990 to 1994.

In May 1994, when the World Wrestling Federation was on tour in Japan, Aoyagi wrestled a few matches for WWF. He defeated Bob Backlund on 8 May and later lost to Owen Hart and Bam Bam Bigelow.

In 2000, Aoyagi made his debut for the new promotion Pro Wrestling NOAH where he would work there until his retirement in 2015.

On 18 February 2018, Aoyagi came out of retirement. He wrestled his last match on 15 August 2021.

== Death ==
Aoyagi died on 6 July 2022. His death was announced by Pro Wrestling Zero1 the following day.

== Championships and accomplishments ==
- Daiwa Entertainment Pro Wrestling
  - DEP Openweight Champion (1 time)
- WAR
  - International Junior Heavyweight Tag Team Championship (1 time) – with Gokuaku Umibozu
- Tokyo Sports
  - Newcomer Award (1990)
  - Best Tag Team Award (1992) – with Akitoshi Saito, Kengo Kimura and Shiro Koshinaka
