= Tenryu Project International Junior Heavyweight Tag Team Championship =

Professional wrestling tag team championship

Details
- Promotion: WAR (1996–2000); Dragon Gate (2006–2007); Tenryu Project (2010–present)
- Date established: February 23, 1996
- Current champions: Ayumu Honda and Keita Yano
- Date won: October 3, 2026

Other names
- WAR International Junior Heavyweight Tag Team Championship (1996–2006); Dragon Gate I-J Heavyweight Tag Team Championship (2006–2007); Tenryu Project International Junior Heavyweight Tag Team Championship (2010–present); IJ Tag Team Championship (2021–present)
Statistics
- First champions: Gedo and Lionheart
- Most reigns: As a team (2 times): Lance Storm and Yuji Yasuraoka; Tomohiro Ishii and Yuji Yasuraoka; As individual (4 times): Yuji Yasuraoka
- Longest reign: Black Tiger V and Masao Orihara (667 days)
- Shortest reign: Naruki Doi and Masato Yoshino (<1 day)

The Tenryu Project International Junior Heavyweight Tag Team Championship (Japanese: 天龍プロジェクト認定インターナショナル・ジュニアヘビー級タッグ王座, Hepburn: Tenryū Purojekuto Nintei Intānashonaru Junia Hebī-kyū Taggu Ōza) is a professional wrestling tag team championship contested for in the Japanese promotion Wrestle Association R, and later Dragon Gate and Tenryu Project. This title was the first tag team championship in Japan dedicated to junior heavyweight wrestlers. In the revived Tenryu Project, the title is also referred to as the IJ Tag Team Championship (IJタッグ王座, IJ Taggu Ōza).

== History ==
The title was created in Wrestle Association R (WAR) on February 23, 1996, when Fuyuki-gun (Gedo and Lionheart) defeated Lance Storm and Yuji Yasuraoka in a tournament final. It was deemed inactive in 2000 when WAR folded, and was later revived by Dragon Gate on August 8, 2006. The I-J belts would be unified with the new Dragon Gate Open the Twin Gate Championship, a tag title made specifically for Dragon Gate, on October 12, 2007. In September 2010, the championship was reactivated by Tenryu Project.

== Reigns ==
As of October 31, 2026, there have been a total of 27 reigns (including one unrecognized) shared among 25 teams and 38 individuals. The title is currently vacant.

Key
| No. | Overall reign number |
| Reign | Reign number for the specific team—reign numbers for the individuals are in parentheses, if different |
| Days | Number of days held |
| Defenses | Number of successful defenses |
| † | Championship change is unrecognized by the promotion |
| <1 | Reign lasted less than a day |
| + | Current reign is changing daily |

| No. | Champion | Championship change | | | Reign statistics | | | Notes | Ref. |
| No. | Champion | Date | Event | Location | Reign | Days | Defenses | Notes | Ref. |
|---|---|---|---|---|---|---|---|---|---|
Wrestle Association R (WAR)
| 1 | Fuyuki-gun (Lionheart and Gedo) | February 23, 1996 | WAR | Sendai, Japan | 1 | 33 | 1 | Defeated Lance Storm and Yuji Yasuraoka in a five-team round-robin tournament final. | |
| 2 | Lance Storm and Yuji Yasuraoka | March 27, 1996 | WAR | Nagoya, Japan | 1 | 115 | 2 | | |
| 3 | Jushin Thunder Liger and El Samurai | July 20, 1996 | WAR 4th Anniversary Show | Tokyo, Japan | 1 | 112 | 0 | | |
| 4 | Lance Storm and Yuji Yasuraoka | November 9, 1996 | WAR-ism '96 | Tokyo, Japan | 2 | 95 | 1 | | |
| 5 | Masaaki Mochizuki and Choden Senshi Battle Ranger | February 12, 1997 | Battle Winter '97 | Toyohashi, Japan | 1 | 108 | 2 | | |
| 6 | Masashi Aoyagi and Gokuaku Umibozu | May 31, 1997 | WAR Fare '97 | Tsu, Japan | 1 | 134 | 2 | Gokuaku Umibozu reverted back to his real name Hirofumi Miura during this reign. | |
| 7 | Yuji Yasuraoka and Tomohiro Ishii | October 12, 1997 | Run to the Hills | Hachioji, Japan | 1 (3, 1) | 6 | 1 | This was a show produced by Wrestle Yume Factory. | |
| — | Vacated | October 18, 1997 | — | — | — | — | — | Title vacated for unknown reasons. | |
| 8 | Masakazu Fukuda and Hiroyoshi Kotsubo | November 24, 1997 | Champion of R '97 | Yokohama, Japan | 1 | 253 | 1 | Defeated Tomohiro Ishii and Yuji Yasuraoka in a four-team tournament final to win the vacant title. | |
| — | Vacated | August 4, 1998 | — | — | — | — | — | Vacated due to Fukuda moving up to the heavyweight division. | |
| 9 | Shinjiro Otani and Tatsuhito Takaiwa | December 11, 1998 | Destiny | Tokyo, Japan | 1 | 80 | 0 | Defeated Masaaki Mochizuki and Masao Orihara to win the vacant title. | |
| 10 | Yuji Yasuraoka and Tomohiro Ishii | March 1, 1999 | WAR | Tokyo, Japan | 2 (4, 2) | 111 | 0 | | |
| — | Vacated | June 20, 1999 | WAR 7th Anniversary Show | Tokyo, Japan | — | — | — | Title vacated when Yasuraoka retired. | |
| — | Deactivated | July 27, 2006 | — | — | — | — | — | WAR closed in 2000 and held its official final event on July 27, 2006. | |
Dragon Gate
| 11 | Masaaki Mochizuki and Don Fujii | August 6, 2006 | The Gate of Adventure | Nagoya, Japan | 1 (2, 1) | 154 | 2 | Defeated Gamma and Dr. Muscle in an eight-team single elimination tournament final to revive the title in Dragon Gate. The title was then referred to as the I-J Heavyweight Tag Team Championship. | |
| 12 | Jado & Gedo | January 7, 2007 | Circuit 2007: Battle Hall Live Vol. 1 | Tokyo, Japan | 1 (1, 2) | 175 | 2 | This was a show produced by New Japan Pro-Wrestling. This match was also for Gedo and Jado's IWGP Junior Heavyweight Tag Team Championship. | |
| 13 | Typhoon (Ryo Saito and Susumu Yokosuka) | July 1, 2007 | Kobe Pro-Wrestling Festival 2007 | Kobe, Japan | 1 | 83 | 1 | | |
| 14 | Tozawa-juku (Kenichiro Arai and Taku Iwasa) | September 22, 2007 | Storm Gate: Tokyo Special – "Dragon Storm 2007" | Tokyo, Japan | 1 | 20 | 0 | | |
| † | Muscle Outlaw'z (Naruki Doi and Masato Yoshino) | October 12, 2007 | The Gate of Victory | Tokyo, Japan | 1 | <1 | 0 | This match was to unify the I-J title into the newly created interim Dragon Gate Open the Twin Gate Championship. Although this reign was originally recognized, it was retroactively removed from the official I-J title lineage. | |
| — | Unified | October 12, 2007 | The Gate of Victory | Tokyo, Japan | — | — | — | Unified with the Open the Twin Gate Championship. | |
Tenryu Project
| 15 | Masao Orihara and Black Tiger V | September 29, 2010 | Never So | Tokyo, Japan | 1 (1, 2) | 667 | 1 | Defeated Madoka and Shinobu when the title was reinstated by Tenryu Project. Black Tiger V previously held the title under his real name Tatsuhito Takaiwa. | |
| 16 | Diamond Ring (Katsuhiko Nakajima and Satoshi Kajiwara) | July 27, 2012 | R-2 "Real": Tenryu Project 8 | Tokyo, Japan | 1 | 266 | 2 | | |
| 17 | Masao Orihara and Hiroki | April 19, 2013 | Diamond Ring | Toyama, Japan | 1 (2, 1) | (Note: The exact date the championship was vacated has not been confirmed, putting their title reign at between 165 and 195 days.) | 1 | This was a show produced by Diamond Ring. | |
| — | Vacated | October 2013 | — | — | — | — | — | Title vacated when Orihara left the promotion. | |
| 18 | Joker (Kuuga and Gamerasu) | October 7, 2014 | Tenryu Project 21: 2nd Mizuchi-R League Finals | Tokyo, Japan | 1 | 404 | 2 | Defeated The Kubota Brothers (Hide Kubota and Yasu Kubota) to win the vacant title. | |
| — | Deactivated | November 15, 2015 | — | — | — | — | — | The title was retired due to Tenryu Project closing. | |
| 19 | Hattoshite Good (Kenichiro Arai and Shota) | June 23, 2021 | Survive the Revolution Vol. 5 | Tokyo, Japan | 1 (2, 1) | 98 | 2 | Defeated Toru and Keita Yano in a four-team single elmimination tournament to win the reactivated title. | |
| 20 | Hikaru Sato and Keita Yano | September 29, 2021 | Survive the Revolution Vol. 10 | Tokyo, Japan | 1 | 233 | 2 | | |
| 21 | Naoki Tanizaki and Yusuke Kodama | May 20, 2022 | Wrestle and Romance Vol. 2 | Tokyo, Japan | 1 | 205 | 1 | | |
| 22 | Kenichiro Arai and Rey Paloma | December 11, 2022 | Wrestle and Romance Vol. 8 | Tokyo, Japan | 1 (3, 1) | 105 | 0 | | |
| 23 | Oji Shiiba and Takuro Niki | March 26, 2023 | Wrestle and Romance Vol. 11 | Tokyo, Japan | 1 | 143 | 2 | | |
| 24 | Yuya Susumu and Keita Yano | August 16, 2023 | Still Revolution Vol. 5 | Tokyo, Japan | 1 (1, 2) | 187 | 2 | | |
| 25 | Naoki Tanizaki and Yusuke Kodama | February 19, 2024 | Still Revolution Vol. 10 | Tokyo, Japan | 2 | 239 | 1 | | |
| 26 | Yuya Susumu and Kengo | October 15, 2024 | Light My Fire Vol. 7 | Tokyo, Japan | 1 (2, 1) | 431 | 2 | | |
| 27 | Yusuke Kodama and Takuro Niki | December 20, 2025 | Live For Today Vol. 8 | Tokyo, Japan | 1 (3, 2) | 249 | 1 | | |
| — | Vacated | August 26, 2026 | — | — | — | — | — | Title vacated due to a lack of defenses. | |
| 28 | Ayumu Honda and Keita Yano | October 3, 2026 | IJ Tag Team & 6-Man Tag Team New Champions 1-Day Tournaments | Tokyo, Japan | 1 (1, 3) | 28+ | 0 | Defeated Kenichiro Arai and Masaaki Mochizuki in the finals of a tournament to win the vacant titles. | |

== Combined reigns ==
As of October 31, 2026.

| † | Indicates the current champion |
| ¤ | The exact length of at least one title reign is uncertain, so the shortest possible length is used. |
| <1 | Reign was less than a day |

=== By team ===
| Rank | Team | No. of reigns | Combined defenses | Combined days |
|---|---|---|---|---|
| 1 | Masao Orihara and Black Tiger V | 1 | 1 | 667 |
| 2 | Naoki Tanizaki and Yusuke Kodama | 2 | 2 | 444 |
| 3 | Yuya Susumu and Kengo | 1 | 2 | 431 |
| 4 | Joker (Kuuga and Gamerasu) | 1 | 2 | 404 |
| 5 | Diamond Ring (Katsuhiko Nakajima and Satoshi Kajiwara) | 1 | 2 | 266 |
| 6 | Masakazu Fukuda and Hiroyoshi Kotsubo | 1 | 1 | 253 |
| 7 | Yusuke Kodama and Takuro Niki | 1 | 1 | 249 |
| 8 | Hikaru Sato and Keita Yano | 1 | 2 | 233 |
| 9 | Lance Storm and Yuji Yasuraoka | 2 | 3 | 210 |
| 10 | Yuya Susumu and Keita Yano | 1 | 2 | 187 |
| 11 | Jado & Gedo | 1 | 2 | 175 |
| 12 | Masao Orihara and Hiroki | 1 | 1 | 165¤ |
| 13 | Masaaki Mochizuki and Don Fujii | 1 | 2 | 154 |
| 14 | Oji Shiiba and Takuro Niki | 1 | 2 | 143 |
| 15 | Masashi Aoyagi and Gokuaku Umibouzu | 1 | 2 | 134 |
| 16 | Yuji Yasuraoka and Tomohiro Ishii | 2 | 1 | 117 |
| 17 | Jushin Thunder Liger and El Samurai | 1 | 0 | 112 |
| 18 | Masaaki Mochizuki and Choden Senshi Battle Ranger | 1 | 2 | 108 |
| 19 | Kenichiro Arai and Rey Paloma | 1 | 0 | 105 |
| 20 | Hattoshite Good (Kenichiro Arai and Shota) | 1 | 2 | 98 |
| 21 | Typhoon (Ryo Saito and Susumu Yokosuka) | 1 | 1 | 83 |
| 22 | Shinjiro Otani and Tatsuhito Takaiwa | 1 | 0 | 80 |
| 23 | Fuyuki-gun (Lionheart and Gedo) | 1 | 1 | 33 |
| 24 | Tozawa-juku (Kenichiro Arai and Taku Iwasa) | 1 | 0 | 20 |
| 25 | Ayumu Honda and Keita Yano † | 1 | 0 | 28+ |
| — | Muscle Outlaw'z (Naruki Doi and Masato Yoshino) | — | 0 | <1 |

=== By wrestler ===
| Rank | Wrestler | No. of reigns | Combined defenses | Combined days |
|---|---|---|---|---|
| 1 | Masao Orihara | 2 | 2 | 832¤ |
| 2 | Tatsuhito Takaiwa/Black Tiger V | 2 | 1 | 747 |
| 3 | Yusuke Kodama | 3 | 3 | 693 |
| 4 | Yuya Susumu | 2 | 4 | 618 |
| 5 | Naoki Tanizaki | 2 | 2 | 444 |
| 6 | Keita Yano † | 3 | 4 | 448+ |
| 7 | Kengo | 1 | 2 | 431 |
| 8 | Gamerasu | 1 | 2 | 404 |
| 8 | Kuuga | 1 | 2 | 404 |
| 10 | Takuro Niki | 2 | 3 | 392 |
| 11 | Yuji Yasuraoka | 4 | 4 | 327 |
| 12 | Satoshi Kajiwara | 1 | 2 | 266 |
| 12 | Katsuhiko Nakajima | 1 | 2 | 266 |
| 14 | Masaaki Mochizuki | 2 | 4 | 262 |
| 15 | Masakazu Fukuda | 1 | 1 | 253 |
| 15 | Hiroyoshi Kotsubo | 1 | 1 | 253 |
| 17 | Hikaru Sato | 1 | 2 | 233 |
| 18 | Kenichiro Arai | 3 | 2 | 223 |
| 19 | Lance Storm | 2 | 3 | 210 |
| 20 | Gedo | 2 | 3 | 208 |
| 21 | Jado | 1 | 2 | 175 |
| 22 | Hiroki | 1 | 1 | 165¤ |
| 23 | Don Fujii | 1 | 2 | 154 |
| 24 | Oji Shiiba | 1 | 2 | 143 |
| 25 | Masashi Aoyagi | 1 | 2 | 134 |
| 25 | Gokuaku Umibozu | 1 | 2 | 134 |
| 27 | Tomohiro Ishii | 2 | 1 | 117 |
| 28 | Jushin Thunder Liger | 1 | 0 | 112 |
| 28 | El Samurai | 1 | 0 | 112 |
| 30 | Choden Senshi Battle Ranger | 1 | 2 | 108 |
| 31 | Rey Paloma | 1 | 0 | 105 |
| 32 | Shota | 1 | 2 | 98 |
| 33 | Ryo Saito | 1 | 1 | 83 |
| 33 | Susumu Yokosuka | 1 | 1 | 83 |
| 35 | Shinjiro Otani | 1 | 0 | 80 |
| 36 | Lionheart | 1 | 1 | 33 |
| 37 | Ayumu Honda † | 1 | 0 | 28+ |
| — | Naruki Doi | — | 0 | <1 |
| — | Masato Yoshino | — | 0 | <1 |

== See also ==
- IWGP Junior Heavyweight Tag Team Championship
- GHC Junior Heavyweight Tag Team Championship
- NWA International Lightweight Tag Team Championship
