= Masakazu Fukuda =

Japanese professional wrestler (1972 – 2000)

Personal information
- Born: May 17, 1972 Ōtawara, Tochigi, Japan
- Died: April 19, 2000 (aged 27) Kesennuma, Miyagi, Japan

Professional wrestling career
- Billed height: 6 ft 2 in (1.88 m)
- Billed weight: 227 lb (103 kg)
- Trained by: Masayoshi Motegi
- Debut: March 20, 1996

Masakazu Fukuda (福田 雅一, Fukuda Masakazu) (May 17, 1972 – April 19, 2000) was a Japanese professional wrestler who is best known for his appearances in WAR and NJPW. He also joined a short-lived stable known as Fighting Club G-EGGS, the stable included Manabu Nakanishi, Yuji Nagata, Brian Johnston and Yutaka Yoshie.

== Death ==
On April 14, 2000, Fukuda suffered a fatal head injury during a match with Katsuyori Shibata in the Young Lion Cup Tournament after taking a flying elbow drop. He was rushed to the hospital but died five days later on April 19 due to a brain hemorrhage; he was 27 years old.

Fukuda had suffered a similar cerebral hemorrhage and undergone brain surgery in October of the prior year and had been out of action for roughly four months as a result. He had also reportedly collapsed in-ring during his first match back, which was roughly two months before his death. According to reports regarding the match with Shibata, Fukuda never landed on his head during the match and took nothing more than a few stiff elbows to the head, the likes of which were normal in a New Japan opening match at the time.

The rest of the 2000 Young Lion’s Cup was dedicated to Fukuda's memory and he was honored with a ten-bell salute and a tribute show in September of that year.

== Championships and accomplishments ==
- Wrestle Association "R"

- WAR International Junior Heavyweight Tag Team Championship (1 time) - with Hiroyoshi Kotsubo
- WAR International Junior Heavyweight Tag Team Championship Tournament (1997) - with Hiroyoshi Kotsubo

== See also ==
- 27 Club
- List of premature professional wrestling deaths
