= Keita Yano =

Japanese professional wrestler

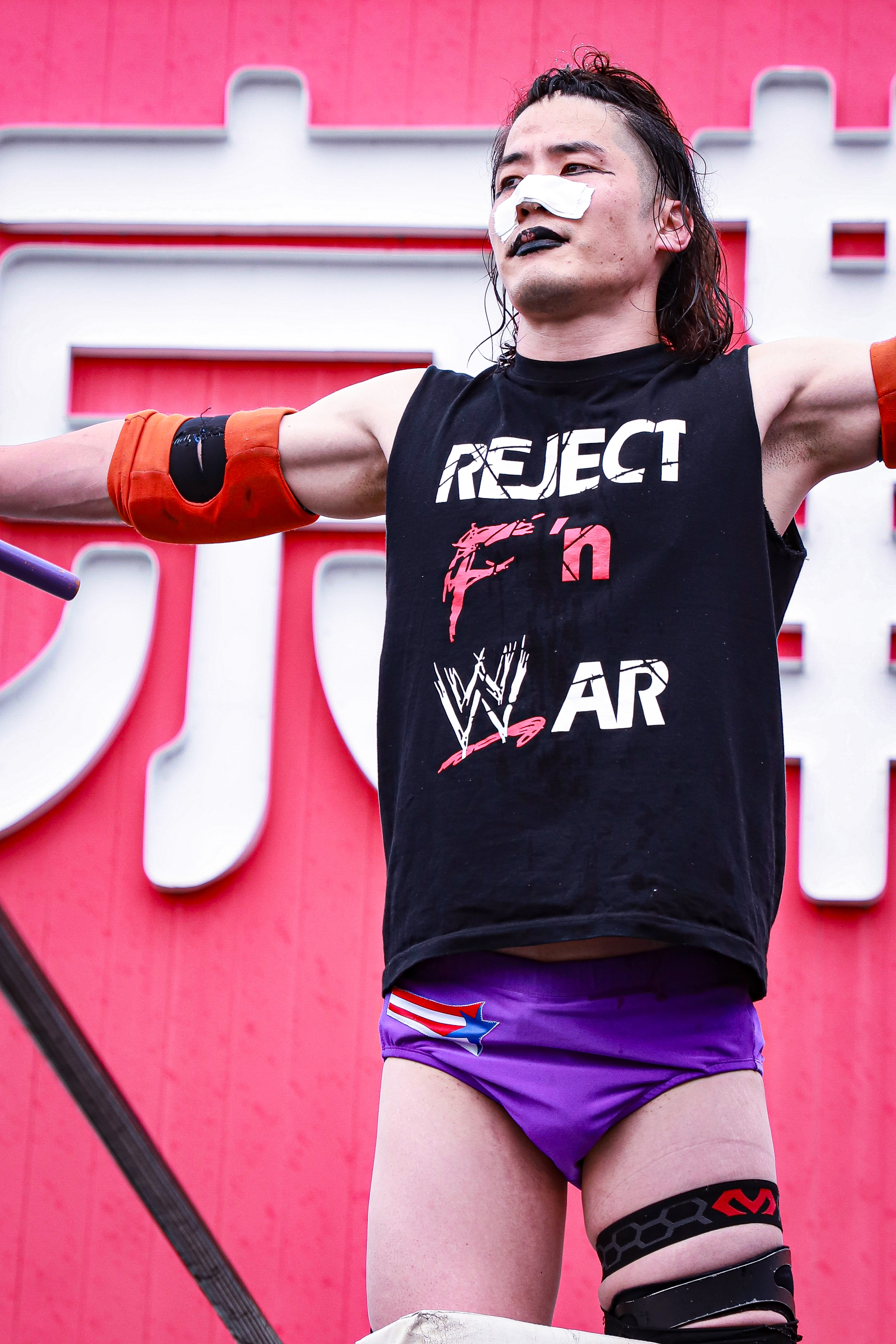
- Yano in July 2023

Personal information
- Born: January 9, 1988 (age 38) Matsubara, Osaka

Professional wrestling career
- Ring name(s): Brody Boy; Keita in the °C; Keita in the House*; Keita Kenta; Keita Yano; Kendo Ke Ita; Yano Keita
- Billed height: 1.81 m (5 ft 11 1/2 in)
- Billed weight: 97 kg (214 lb)
- Billed from: Detroit, Michigan
- Trained by: Joe E. Legend; Negro Navarro; Yuki Ishikawa
- Debut: February 25, 2007

Keita Yano (矢野 啓太, Yano Keita; born January 9, 1988) is a Japanese professional wrestler and mixed martial artist currently working for Professional Wrestling Wallabee. He started his career with Battlarts in February 2007 and remained with the promotion for four years, winning the B-Rule Tournament in 2009. During his tenure, Yano also represented Battlarts in major Japanese promotions such as New Japan Pro-Wrestling (NJPW) and Pro Wrestling Zero1 and American promotion Chikara, where he took part in the Young Lions Cup VIII tournament in August 2010. After the folding of Battlarts, Yano began working for DDT Pro-Wrestling, where, as a representative of the Crying Wolf stable, he became a one-time Ironman Heavymetalweight Champion, before parting ways with the promotion in July 2012.

== Professional wrestling career ==
=== Battlarts (2006–2011) ===
Yano began training professional wrestling with Battlarts in 2006, when the promotion accepted his third application to enter its training program. He eventually made his in-ring debut on February 25, 2007, losing to Manabu Hara. During the rest of 2007, Yano faced the likes of Yuta Yoshikawa, Kota Ibushi and Ryuji Hijikata, losing all of his matches. As Battlarts only held an event every two months, Yano also made regular appearances for Big Japan Pro Wrestling (BJW) and women's wrestling promotion Ice Ribbon, losing all of his matches in those promotions as well. Yano finally picked up his first win at a Battlarts event on March 9, 2008, submitting Akifumi Saito with the Larsson. Despite his first win, Yano's second year in professional wrestling also included mostly opening matches and losses. Through Battlarts' and especially its top star Munenori Sawa's relationship with Pro Wrestling Zero1, Yano also made appearances for the promotion, most notably taking part in the 2008 Tenkaichi Jr. tournament. On January 10, 2009, Yano entered the B-Rule Tournament, advancing directly to the semifinals, after Yuta Yoshikawa was unable to wrestle in his first round match. Later that same day, Yano defeated Super Tiger II in his semifinal match to advance to the finals, where he would defeat veteran Alexander Otsuka via points to win the entire tournament. Finally out of the opening match spot, Yano main evented his first Battlarts event on February 15, when he and Munenori Sawa were defeated in a tag team match by Super Tiger II and Yuki Ishikawa. The following June, Yano entered the 2009 B-1 Climax tournament, but failed to advance from his round-robin block. During 2009, Yano also made debuts for Apache Pro-Wrestling Army, Pro Wrestling Freedoms, Kaientai Dojo (K-Dojo) and Osaka Pro Wrestling. On January 17, 2010, Yano made it to the finals of his second B-Rule Tournament in a row, but was this time defeated by Yujiro Yamamoto. During the year, Yano teamed regularly with Munenori Sawa, while also debuting a new look, inspired by the Joker from the Batman film The Dark Knight.

=== Chikara (2010) ===
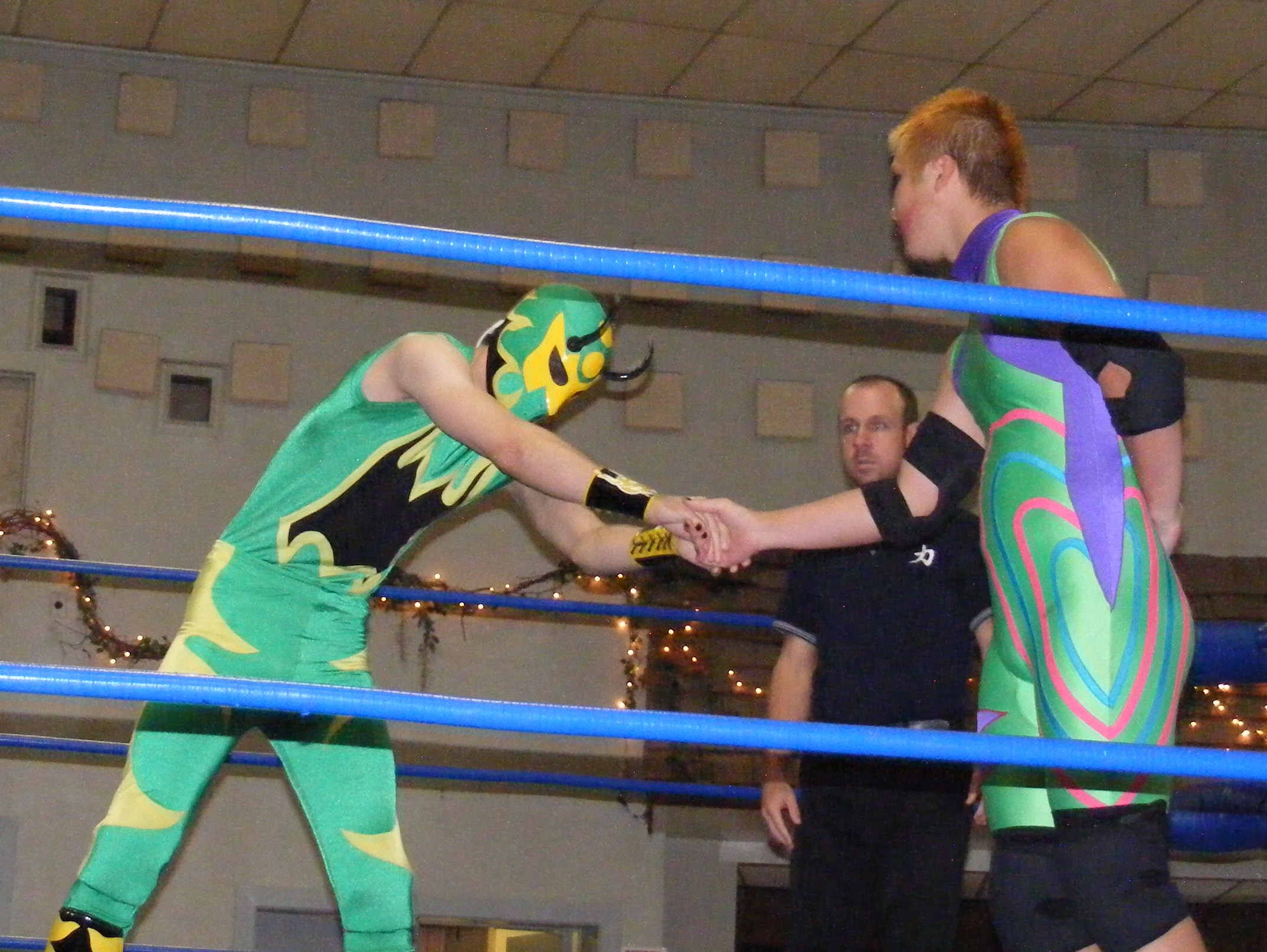
Yano and Green Ant shaking hands prior to their match during the Young Lions Cup weekend

On August 28, 2010, Yano made his American debut, when he represented Battlarts in Chikara's eighth Young Lions Cup tournament in Reading, Pennsylvania. In his first round match, Yano defeated Mike Sydal with a submission. Later that same day, Yano wrestled in a six-way elimination semifinal match, from which he was the third man eliminated by Obariyon. The following day, Yano defeated Green Ant in a non-tournament match. The finish of the match had to improvised, after Green Ant legitimately broke his arm, after Yano performed one of his signature moves, Calf Branding, on him. Back in Japan, Yano began working regularly for Professional Wrestling Wallabee, a promotion founded by the male wrestlers of Ice Ribbon, becoming the promotion's first TV Champion in October 2010. Yano later went to unify the TV Championship with the Capture International and Ricky Fuji Aggressive World Heavyweight Championships, creating what he referred to as the "Indie Triple Crown". On October 8, 2010, Yano made his debut for New Japan Pro-Wrestling (NJPW), losing to Tomohiro Ishii at a NEVER event, a New Japan project aimed at showcasing up-and-coming wrestlers not signed to the promotion.

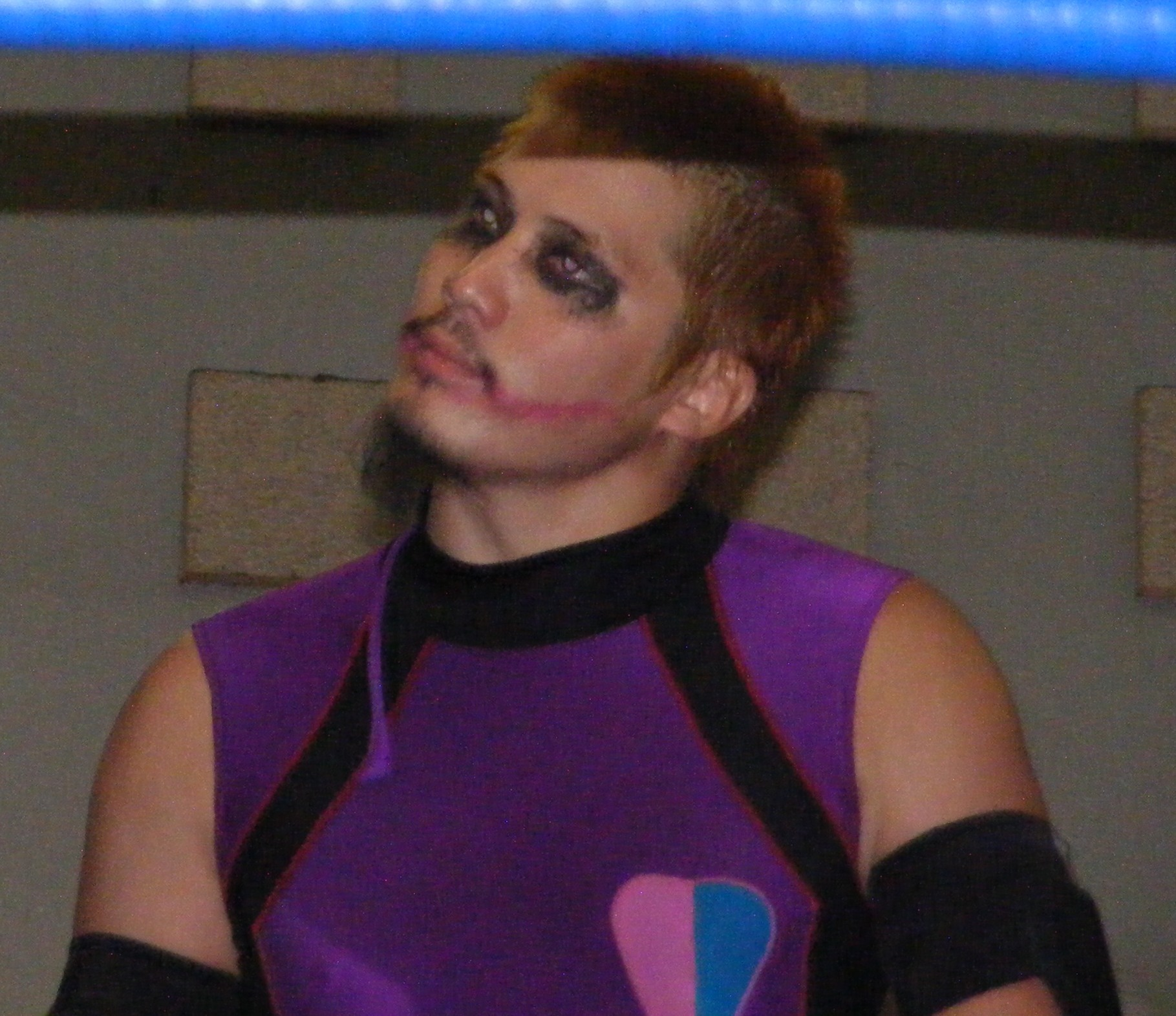
Yano in 2010

On January 23, 2011, Yano once again made it to the finals of the B-Rule Tournament, but was, for the second year in a row, defeated there by Yujiro Yamamoto. On March 21, Yano was defeated by Battlarts founder Yuki Ishikawa in a main event singles match. The following day, Battlarts announced Yano's resignation from the promotion, which had announced it would be folding before the end of the year. Yano returned to take part in Battlarts' final event on November 5, 2011, defeating Kenji Takeshima in the opening match.

=== DDT Pro-Wrestling (2011–2012) ===
On November 13, 2011, Yano began working regularly for the DDT Pro-Wrestling promotion, when he teamed with Antonio Honda and Yasu Urano to defeat Hoshitango, Mikami and Tomomitsu Matsunaga in a six-man tag team match. Following the event, Honda announced that the three men, along with Yuji Hino, had formed a stable named "Crying Wolf". All four members of Crying Wolf remained undefeated for the rest of the year, with Yano ending his year by pinning Michael Nakazawa on December 31 in a tag team match, where he and Antonio Honda defeated Do Hentai Dan (Nakazawa and Hikaru Sato). Crying Wolf's win streak ended at the first event of 2012 on January 8, when the four members were defeated in an eight-man tag team match by Daisuke Sasaki, Keisuke Ishii, Masa Takanashi and Shigehiro Irie. During the following months, Crying Wolf developed a storyline rivalry with the Homoiro Clover Z stable, with Crying Wolf picking up six-man tag team victories on January 29 and March 4, and finally defeating Danshoku Dino, Hiroshi Fukuda, Kudo and Makoto Oishi in an eight-man elimination tag team match on March 18. On April 1, Yano took part in the annual Anytime and Anywhere battle royal, a match combining elements of a regular battle royal and a ladder match, where he managed to grab the "Box Office Rights Anytime, Anywhere" contract to earn the right to book a DDT event of his own. On April 8, Yano took part in a ten-minute, six-person battle royal for the Ironman Heavymetalweight Championship. Towards the end of the match, Yano pinned Kana to win the title, however, just twenty seconds later, Kana rolled him up to regain the title. On July 1, Yano used his "Box Office Rights Anytime, Anywhere" contract to book a co-promoted event between DDT and Professional Wrestling Wallabee. The following day, DDT announced that the promotion and Yano had agreed to terminate his DDT contract due to "ideological differences".

=== Other promotions (2012–present) ===
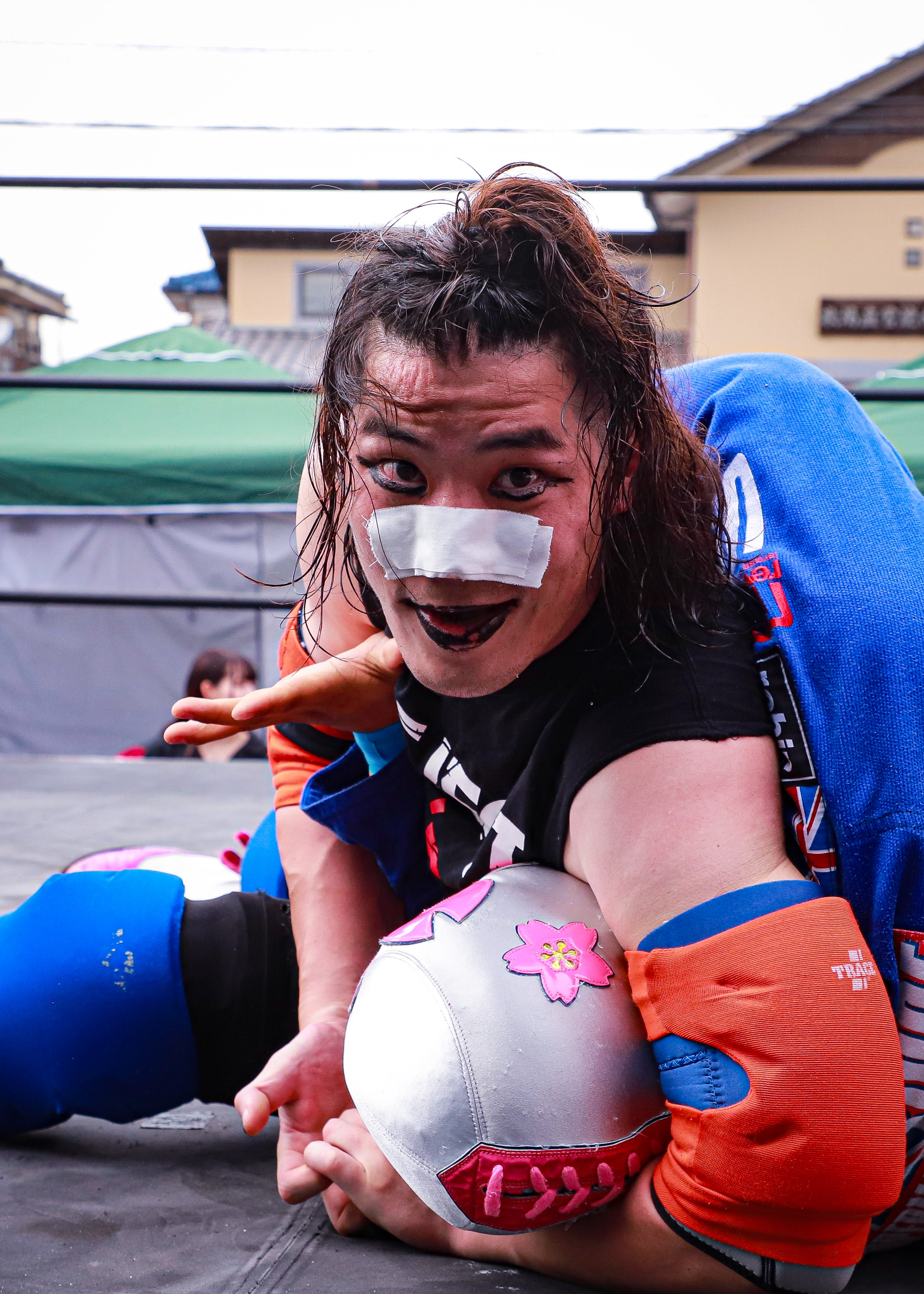
Yano facing Cerejeria at "Harumi Pro Wrestling" in July 2023

Following his departure from DDT, Yano concentrated on his work with the Professional Wrestling Wallabee promotion, where he now also held a backstage executive role. While also continuing to work for other small promotions, including Apache Pro-Wrestling Army, Freedoms, and Ganko Pro Wrestling, Yano returned to Zero1 on February 8, 2013, working in an opening tag team match.

== Personal life ==
Yano cites Kendo Kashin as his main influence in wanting to become a wrestler himself. He later also became a fan of Bruiser Brody, adopting many of his in-ring mannerisms, including his signature "huss" chant, while also billing himself from Detroit, Michigan, Brody's hometown. Yano has wrestled as both "Kendo Ke Ita" and "Brody Boy" in honor of his idols. Yano is a fan of soccer, having played the game with some success in high school, and has named two of his signature moves after Swedish soccer players Freddie Ljungberg and Henrik Larsson.

== Championships and accomplishments ==
- Battlarts

- B-Rule Tournament (2009)

- Chika Puroresu Exit

- Capture International Championship (1 time)
- WUW Aun Japanese Underground Championship (1 time)
- WUW World Tag Team Championship (1 time) – with Buki

- DDT Pro-Wrestling

- Ironman Heavymetalweight Championship (1 time)

- Professional Wrestling Wallabee

- Wallabee TV Championship (2 times, current)
- NWA-Wallabee Worlds Martial-Arts Championship (1 time, inaugural)
- Wallabee Worlds Martial-Arts Title Tournament (2013)

- Tenryu Project

- Tenryu Project International Junior Heavyweight Championship (1 time, current)
- International Junior Heavyweight Tag Team Championship (3 times, current ) – with Hikaru Sato (1) , Yuya Susumu (1) and Ayumu Honda (1)
- Ryūkon Cup (II)

- VKF Wrestle Naniwa

- Ricky Fuji Aggressive World Heavyweight Championship (1 time)

== Mixed martial arts record ==
Professional record breakdown
| 1 match | 0 wins | 1 loss |
| By knockout | 0 | 1 |
| By submission | 0 | 0 |
| By decision | 0 | 0 |
| By disqualification | 0 | 0 |

| Res. | Record | Opponent | Method | Event | Date | Round | Time | Location | Notes |
|---|---|---|---|---|---|---|---|---|---|
| Loss | 0–1 | Carlos Toyota | TKO (punches) | RFC: Real Fight Championship 2 | May 2, 2015 | 1 | 0:17 | Yokohama, Kanagawa | |
