= Masao Orihara =

Japanese professional wrestler (born 1969)

Personal information
- Born: June 16, 1969 (age 57) Oura, Gunma

Professional wrestling career
- Ring name(s): Dragon the Great; Gekko; Iga; Masao Orihara; Sasuke the Great; Secret Sasuke
- Billed height: 1.75 m (5 ft 9 in)
- Billed weight: 88 kg (194 lb)
- Billed from: Oura, Gunma
- Trained by: Giant Baba; Genichiro Tenryu; AJPW Dojo
- Debut: February 22, 1990

Masao Orihara (折原昌夫, Orihara Masao) (born June 16, 1969) is a Japanese professional wrestler. He is known for his tenure with various Japanese promotions such as Michinoku Pro Wrestling, Wrestle Association R, Battlarts and Dramatic Dream Team.

== Professional wrestling career ==
Orihara was trained in the All Japan Pro Wrestling Dojo under Genichiro Tenryu's tutelage. When Tenryu left for Super World of Sports, Orihara and others followed him to the new promotion. In 1992, Orihara was sent to Mexico, where he learnt the high-flying lucha libre style and wrestled for Consejo Mundial de Lucha Libre as Iga, a masked ninja character, mostly teaming with fellow young wrestler Toshiyuki Nakahara (Koga). Upon his return, SWS had been disbanded and replaced with Wrestle Association R. There Orihara showed his new style and competed in memorable cruiserweight bouts with Ultimo Dragon, with whom he formed a long friendship. After the WAR demise, Orihara landed in Michinoku Pro Wrestling, where he became Sasuke the Great, a The Great Sasuke copycat. Orihara formed a tag team with Takeshi Ono (who competed as Masked Tiger) and feuded with Sasuke and Tiger Mask. Alongside their work in Michinoku Pro, Orihara and Ono became a mainstay team on Battlarts. In 1999, Orihara competed in New Japan Pro-Wrestling and Dramatic Dream Team.

Currently, Orihara is a part of Satoru Sayama's Real Japan Pro Wrestling and Tenryu Project.

== Championships and accomplishments ==
- Consejo Mundial de Lucha Libre

- CMLL Japan Tag Team Championship (1 time) – with Nosawa

- Dramatic Dream Team

- KO-D Openweight Championship (1 time, Inaugural)

- Guts World Pro-Wrestling

- GWC Tag Team Championship (1 time) – with Masked Mystery
- GWC 6-Man Tag Team Championship (2 times) – with Dick Togo and Ryan Upin (1), Amigo Suzuki and Ryan Upin (1)

- Michinoku Pro Wrestling

- Apex of Triangle Championship (1 time) – with Takeshi Ono and Cow Cow
- Futaritabi Tag Team League (2003) – with Dick Togo

- Mobius

- Apex of Triangle Championship (4 times) – with Dick Togo and Buho Mochero (2), Nobutaka Moribe and El Jalapeño (2)

- Pro Wrestling Illustrated

- PWI ranked him # 47 of the best 500 singles wrestlers in the PWI 500 in 2000

- Real Japan Pro Wrestling

- Legend Championship (1 time)

- Tenryu Project

- Tenryu Proyect International Junior Heavyweight Championship (1 time)
- Tenryu Project International Junior Heavyweight Tag Team Championship (2 times) – with Black Tiger V (1) and Hiroki (1)

- Tokyo Pro Wrestling (1994–1996)
  - TWA Junior Heavyweight Championship (1 time)
- Tokyo Sports

- Rookie of the Year (1991)

- Universal Wrestling Association / Universal Wrestling Federation

- UWA/UWF Intercontinental Tag Team Championship (1 time) – with The Great Sasuke

- Wrestling Entertainment Wrestling

- Apex of Triangle Championship (1 time) – with Dick Togo and Kintaro Kanemura

- Wrestling and Romance

- WAR International Junior Heavyweight Championship (1 time)

- Wrestling Observer Newsletter

- Best Wrestling Maneuver (1991) Moonsault to the outside of the ring
