= Tenryu Project International Junior Heavyweight Championship =

Professional wrestling championship

Details
- Promotion: Wrestle Association R (1995–2000); Dragon Gate (2006–2007); Tenryu Project (2010–2015; 2021-present)
- Date established: March 26, 1995
- Current champion: Masaaki Mochizuki
- Date won: September 19, 2026

Other names
- WAR International Junior Heavyweight Championship (1995–2010); Tenryu Project International Junior Heavyweight Championship (2010–present); IJ Singles Championship (2021–present)
Statistics
- First champion: Gedo
- Most reigns: Masaaki Mochizuki (4 reigns)
- Longest reign: Masaaki Mochizuki (2,705 days)
- Shortest reign: Masaaki Mochizuki (<1 day)
- Oldest champion: Masaaki Mochizuki (56 years, 8 months and 2 days)

The Tenryu Project International Junior Heavyweight Championship (Japanese: 天龍プロジェクト認定インターナショナル・ジュニアヘビー級王座, Hepburn: Tenryū Purojekuto Nintei Intānashonaru Junia Hebī-kyū Ōza) is a professional wrestling championship contested for in the Japanese professional wrestling promotion Tenryu Project. The title was established in 1995 in Wrestle Association R (WAR). In the revived Tenryu Project, the title is also referred to as the IJ Singles Championship (IJシングル王座, IJ Shinguru Ōza).

== Title history ==
=== Inaugural championship tournament ===
On March 26, 1995, an eight-man single elimination tournament was held on the second day of the Wrestle Association R (WAR) event Battle Angel. The tournament saw Gedo defeat Lionheart in the finals to become the inaugural champion.

First round
Gedo	Pin
Yuji Yasuraoka	07:21
1-2-3 Kid	Pin
Negro Casas	04:40
Lionheart	Pin
Masao Orihara	08:52
Último Dragón	Pin
Ultimate Dragon	09:58

Semifinals
Gedo	Pin
1-2-3 Kid	7:08
Lionheart	Pin
Último Dragón	11:19

Finals
Gedo	Pin
Lionheart	19:31

The title was part of New Japan Pro-Wrestling's short-lived J-Crown Championship in 1996 and 1997. In late 2006, the title briefly moved to Dragon Gate where Masaaki Mochizuki beat Gedo in a decision match on January 26, 2007 to determine the final champion, and then retired the title.

=== Revivals ===
The title was revived in April 2010, for Genichiro Tenryu's Tenryu Project promotion, but it was retired again in 2015 after the promotion closed. After Tenryu Project reopened in 2021, the championship was reactivated. An eight-man single elimination tournament was held on May 25 and June 6 to crown a new champion. Hub defeated Kengo in the finals.

First round May 25
Toru	12:47
Hub	Pin
Kenichiro Arai	Pin
Kikutaro	12:47
Tsubasa	Pin
Mazada	13:33
"brother" Yasshi	19:59
Kengo	Pin

Semifinals; June 12
Hub	Sub
Kenichiro Arai	10:54
Tsubasa	16:19
Kengo	Pin

Finals; June 12
Hub	Pin
Kengo	19:59

== Reigns ==
As of October 30, 2026, there have been a total of 29 reigns shared between 21 different champions and two vacancies. The current champion is Masaaki Mochizuki who is in his fifth reign.

Key
No.	Overall reign number
Reign	Reign number for the specific champion
Days	Number of days held
Defenses	Number of successful defenses
(NET)	Championship change took place "no earlier than" the date listed
<1	Reign lasted less than a day

No.	Champion	Championship change			Reign statistics			Notes	Ref.
No.	Champion	Date	Event	Location	Reign	Days	Defenses	Notes	Ref.
Wrestle Association R (WAR)
1	Gedo	March 26, 1995	Battle Angel	Tokyo, Japan	1	70	2	Defeated Lionheart in a tournament final to become the inaugural champion.	
2	Lionheart	June 4, 1995	House show	Tokyo, Japan	1	54	1		
3	Último Dragón	July 28, 1995	House show	Tokyo, Japan	1	32	0		
4	Gedo	August 29, 1995	House show	Shizuoka, Japan	2	37	0		
5	Último Dragón	October 5, 1995	House show	Saitama, Japan	2	305	5		
6	The Great Sasuke	August 5, 1996	G1 Climax 1996	Tokyo, Japan	1	67	1	The championship became one of eight championships comprising New Japan Pro Wrestling's J-Crown.	
7	Último Dragón	October 11, 1996	Osaka Crush Night	Osaka, Japan	3	85	5	This match was for the J-Crown.	
8	Jushin Thunder Liger	January 4, 1997	Wrestling World 1997	Tokyo, Japan	1	153	4	This match was for the J-Crown.	
9	Yuji Yasuraoka	June 6, 1997	WAR	Tokyo, Japan	1	588	6	Only the WAR championship was on the line. Liger retained the other seven titles.	
10	Masao Orihara	January 15, 1999	House show	Tokyo, Japan	1	45	0		
11	Masaaki Mochizuki	March 1, 1999	House show	Tokyo, Japan	1	2,705	2	WAR stopped running cards in July 2000, but Mochizuki kept the title and did not regularly defend it.	
12	Pentagón Black	July 27, 2006	WAR Final: Reborn to Future	Tokyo, Japan	1	119	0		
Dragon Gate
13	Masaaki Mochizuki	November 23, 2006	Crown Gate: Osaka Special	Osaka, Japan	2	<1	0	Dragon Gate incorrectly reported this as the 12th reign, creating an offset in the reported number of reigns.	
—	Vacated	November 23, 2006	—	—	—	—	—	Mochizuki immediately vacated the title.	
14	Masaaki Mochizuki	January 26, 2007	2007 Primal Gate	Tokyo, Japan	3	<1	0	Defeated Gedo to win the vacant title, and to determine the final champion.	
—	Deactivated	January 26, 2007	—	—	—	—	—	Mochizuki immediately retired the title.	
Tenryu Project
15	Masaaki Mochizuki	April 19, 2010	Tenryu Project	Osaka, Japan	4	51	0	Defeated Susumu Yokosuka and Naoki Tanizaki in a three-way match.	
16	Tiger Shark	June 9, 2010	Next Revolution	Tokyo, Japan	1	112	5		
17	Hiroki	September 29, 2010	Never So	Tokyo, Japan	1	76	1		
18	Ryuji Hijikata	December 14, 2010	Gekiryū	Tokyo, Japan	1	591	1		
19	Takaku Fuke	July 27, 2012	R-2: "Real" Tenryu Project 8	Tokyo, Japan	1	155	0		
20	Masao Orihara	December 29, 2012	Genichiro Tenryu Return Match: Revolution	Tokyo, Japan	2	(Note: The exact date the championship was vacated has not been confirmed, putting the title reign at between 276 day and 306 days.)	2	During this reign, the number of reigns was corrected, and Orihara was correctly recognized as the 20th titleholder.	
—	Vacated	October 1, 2013 NET	—	—	—	—	—	Title vacated when Masao Orihara left the promotion after a defense against Manjimaru on October 1, 2013 at Kōryū R.	
—	Deactivated	December 15, 2015	—	—	—	—	—	Title deactivated when Tenryu Project closed.	
21	Hub	June 12, 2021	Survive the Revolution Vol. 4	Tokyo, Japan	1	62	2	Defeated Kengo in the final of a tournament to win the reactivated title.	
22	Kengo	August 13, 2021	Survive the Revolution Vol. 8	Tokyo, Japan	1	183	3		
23	Toru	February 12, 2022	Osaka Crush Night 2022: 2nd Crush	Osaka, Japan	1	123	2		
24	Hikaru Sato	June 15, 2022	Wrestle and Romance Vol. 3	Tokyo, Japan	1	463	6		
25	Yuya Susumu	September 21, 2023	Still Revolution Vol. 6	Tokyo, Japan	1	336	3		
26	Yusuke Kodama	August 22, 2024	Light My Fire Vol. 5	Tokyo, Japan	1	272	3		
27	Koji Iwamoto	May 21, 2025	Live For Today Vol. 2	Tokyo, Japan	1	280	4		
28	Keita Yano	February 25, 2026	Live For Today Vol. 10	Tokyo, Japan	1	206	2		
29	Masaaki Mochizuki	September 19, 2026	Reborn for the Future Vol. 4	Tokyo, Japan	5	41+	0		

== Combined reigns ==
†	Indicates the current champion
¤	The exact length of at least one title reign is uncertain, so the shortest possible length is used.

Rank	Wrestler	No. of Reigns	Combined defenses	Combined Days
1	Masaaki Mochizuki †	5	2	2,797+
2	Ryuji Hijikata	1	1	591
3	Yuji Yasuraoka	1	6	588
4	Hikaru Sato	1	6	463
5	Último Dragón	3	10	422
6	Yuya Susumu	1	3	336
7	Masao Orihara	2	2	321¤
8	Koji Iwamoto	1	2	280
9	Yusuke Kodama	1	3	272
10	Keita Yano	1	2	206
11	Kengo	1	3	183
12	Takaku Fuke	1	0	155
13	Jushin Thunder Liger	1	4	153
14	Toru	1	2	123
15	Pentagón Black	1	0	119
16	Tiger Shark	1	4	112
17	Gedo	2	2	107
18	Hiroki	1	1	76
19	The Great Sasuke	1	1	67
20	Hub	1	2	62
21	Lionheart	1	1	54
