= Welcome to the Darkside =

1998 professional wrestling event in Tokyo, Japan

- Promotion: Frontier Martial-Arts Wrestling
- Date: August 22, 1998
- City: Tokyo, Japan
- Venue: DirecTV Studio
- Attendance: 50

Pay-per-view chronology
← Previous; King of Fight II 1998: Day 2	Next → Super Dynamism 1998: Day 11

Welcome to the Darkside was a professional wrestling pay-per-view (PPV) event produced by Frontier Martial-Arts Wrestling (FMW). The event took place on August 22, 1998 at the DirecTV Studio in Tokyo, Japan.

Four matches were contested at the event. In the main event, Hayabusa's alter ego Darkside Hayabusa lost to Koji Nakagawa after outside interference by Mr. Gannosuke. In other matches at the event, Kodo Fuyuki and Kouhiro Kanemura retained the FMW Brass Knuckles Tag Team Championship against Jado and Gedo, The Gladiator defeated Team Zero in a gauntlet match and Super Leather defeated Hido.

== Background ==
On July 10, the FMW team of Hayabusa, Daisuke Ikeda, Hisakatsu Oya and Ricky Fuji competed against Team No Respect's Kodo Fuyuki, Koji Nakagawa, Jado and Gedo in a four-on-four elimination tag team match. Nakagawa lastly eliminated Hayabusa to win the match for TNR. This loss angered Hayabusa and he decided to avenge his loss from Nakagawa and proclaimed that he would unleash his darkside on Nakagawa, leading to a match between Darkside Hayabusa and Koji Nakagawa for the August 22 pay-per-view which would be titled Welcome to the Darkside as a result.

On June 19, Super Leather and Hido competed in a loser leaves TNR match, which Hido won after TNR members Yukihiro Kanemura and Gedo attacked Leather and then Go Ito fired Leather from the group largely due to frustration over Leather's recent losing streak. As a result, Leather turned into a face and began feuding with TNR and sided with the FMW team. On July 10, Leather defeated Hido in a chain street fight. This led to another match between Leather and Hido at Welcome to the Darkside.

== Event ==
=== Preliminary matches ===
Ricky Fuji and his band started the event by performing Fuji's entrance theme song "Sexy Storm". The first match of the event was a singles match between Super Leather and Hido. Hido delivered a low blow to Leather and used several moves to keep the momentum and performed a moonsault from the middle rope. Leather got some near-falls on Hido and after failing in an attempt, Leather executed a brainbuster for the victory. After the match, Team No Respect played a Brief Brothers skit.

The Gladiator competed against three low-card competitors in a gauntlet match. He defeated his first opponent Naohiko Yamazaki after an Awesome Bomb. Gladiator would then defeat his second opponent Yoshinori Sasaki after an Awesome Splash. His final opponent was Mr. Pogo #2. Gladiator tried to perform an Awesome Bomb but Pogo escaped it and delivered a backdrop suplex. He continued the momentum with an elevated cutter and a chokeslam. Gladiator made a comeback by performing a release German suplex but Pogo did not sell the move and charged at him but Gladiator hit a boot. He then hit a lariat and an Awesome Bomb for the win.

Kodo Fuyuki and Yukihiro Kanemura defended the Brass Knuckles Tag Team Championship against their Team No Respect teammates Jado and Gedo. Both teams exchanged momentum throughout the match. Near the end of the match, Gedo attempted a hurricanrana on Fuyuki but Fuyuki countered by powerbombing him. Fuyuki attempted to perform another powerbomb but Gedo countered that into a hurricanrana. Fuyuki attempted a running lariat on Gedo but Gedo countered with a backfist and then ran towards Fuyuki, who hit a running lariat on Gedo to retain the title.

=== Main event match ===
The Darkside Hayabusa took on Koji Nakagawa. Nakagawa dominated the earlier part of the match but Hayabusa hit him with a fork and made him bleed. Hayabusa delivered a low blow to Nakagawa and delivered a springboard legdrop to Nakagawa's groin and then attempted to hit the referee but the referee ducked it. Nakagawa made a comeback with a low blow and placed a table in the corner and tried to toss Hayabusa into it but Hayabusa countered it and then delivered a high kick and hit Nakagawa with the table to send him outside the ring. Hayabusa put Nakagawa through the table with a diving senton through the top rope but the table did not break and he followed with a senton bomb. Hayabusa grabbed a piece of table to hit Nakagawa but Nakagawa countered it and attempted to hit him with the fork but Hayabusa blinded him by spitting red mist in his eyes. Hayabusa delivered a facelock jawbreaker and a Falcon Arrow to Nakagawa and then hit a backfist to the referee. Go Ito went to the ring and Hayabusa grabbed him and delivered a kneeling reverse piledriver. Hayabusa then climbed the top rope for a Phoenix Splash but the lights went out and Mr. Gannosuke returned to FMW in a Jinsei Shinzaki disguise and hit Hayabusa with a Powerbomb, allowing Nakagawa to win the match. After the match, an irate Hayabusa attacked the referee.

== Reception ==
Stuart of Puroresu Central gave negative reviews on the event, considering it "simply appalling" and ranked it among "the worst major shows of 1998 worldwide" with "ludicrous booking and poor action", with "Again, the lack of crowd heat also hurt. From its debut show to some point in 1998, FMW had a lot of wild Street Fights that weren't technically very good, but were made so entertaining by a maniacal crowd that screamed non-stop. The worst or at least unentertaining FMW show I've seen to date. FMW's downhill slide from its golden era was well on the way, although it would get no lower than this. The show... well, no Gannosuke, no Tanaka, no Kuroda, no good. Avoid at all costs."

== Aftermath ==
Hayabusa continued his feud with Team No Respect and primarily TNR member Koji Nakagawa after the event. On September 20, Koji Nakagawa, Kodo Fuyuki and Gedo defeated Hayabusa and Ricky Fuji in a handicap match, which resulted in Nakagawa and Fuyuki earning title shots against Hayabusa for the unified Brass Knuckles Heavyweight Championship and Independent Heavyweight Championship. Hayabusa successfully defended the championship against Nakagawa on October 6. Fuyuki received his title shot against Hayabusa on November 20, where he defeated Hayabusa to win the title.

== Results ==
No.	Results	Stipulations	Times
1	Super Leather defeated Hido	Singles match	11:45
2	The Gladiator defeated Naohiko Yamazaki, Yoshinori Sasaki and Mr. Pogo #2	Gauntlet match	7:11
3	Kodo Fuyuki and Yukihiro Kanemura (c) defeated Jado and Gedo	Tag team match for the FMW Brass Knuckles Tag Team Championship	13:09
4	Koji Nakagawa defeated Darkside Hayabusa	Singles match	21:10
(c) / – the champion(s) heading into the match
