= 昭二 =

昭二, meaning 'brilliant, two', may refer to:

- Akiji, Japanese give name of the actor Akiji Kobayashi (1930–1996)
- Shoji, a masculine Japanese given name

== See also ==
- Shoji (disambiguation)
