= FMW Productions =

Japanese record label

- Parent company: Frontier Martial-Arts Wrestling
- Founded: 1995
- Founder: Shoichi Arai
- Defunct: 2001
- Genre: J-pop; Rock
- Country of origin: Japan

FMW Productions was the name of a Japanese record label of professional wrestling promotion Frontier Martial-Arts Wrestling (FMW), which produced many compilation albums consisting of theme songs of wrestlers on the FMW roster during the promotion's existence between 1991 and 2001.

== Last Fight ==
FMW Last Fight

Compilation album by Frontier Martial-Arts Wrestling
- Released: July 21, 1994
- Recorded: 1994
- Genres: Jpop; Rock
- Labels: BMG Victor; FMW Productions

Last Fight was the first compilation album by Frontier Martial-Arts Wrestling (FMW), which was produced and released in 1994. The album was recorded shortly after Atsushi Onita lost his match to Genichiro Tenryu at 5th Anniversary Show on May 5, 1994, forcing him to retire at the following year's 6th Anniversary Show. The album was released on July 21, 1994 and consisted of various FMW theme songs and clips of Atsushi Onita's retirement press conference on May 9, 1994 as well as his acclaimed messages with Genichiro Tenryu from 5th Anniversary Show and Tarzan Goto at the 1990 Summer Spectacular and the 2nd Anniversary Show.

=== Track listing ===
1. Retirement Press Conference (May 9, 1994)
2. Atsushi Onita – "Wild Thing" by X
3. Mune-ippai No Puroresu Jinsei
4. Encounter With Wrestling
5. Return First Round ~ FMW Raising An Army Decision
6. FMW Raising An Army
7. Barbed Wire
8. Shiodome ~ Norobu Barbed Wire Deathmatch
9. FMW 1st Anniversary Show
10. The Meaning Of A Flame and Mine Deathmatch
11. Atsushi Onita vs. Tarzan Goto at FMW 2nd Anniversary Show
12. Zasetsu To Fukkatsu
13. Atsushi Onita vs. Genichiro Tenryu at FMW 5th Anniversary Show
14. To The Next Generation
15. Message To The Fans
16. Mune-ippai Ni Dakishimete
17. Current Blast Sound
18. Timed Blast Sound

== Phoenix: FMW Official Theme Song CD 1st ==
FMW Official Theme Song CD 1st

Compilation album by Frontier Martial-Arts Wrestling
- Released: December 20, 1995
- Recorded: 1995
- Genres: Jpop; Rock
- Labels: Toshiba EMI; FMW Productions

Phoenix: FMW Official Theme Song CD 1st was the second compilation album by FMW which featured various versions of theme songs of Hayabusa and various FMW theme songs.

=== Track listing ===
No.	Title	Subject	Length
1.	"Jokyoku"	FMW Opening Theme Song	0:56
2.	"Team FMW"	FMW Main Theme Song	4:29
3.	"Fight With Dream"	Hayabusa	3:15
4.	"Halcón"	Hayabusa	4:40
5.	"See You Again ~ Kitto Ashita Ha"	FMW Ending Theme Song	5:14
6.	"Fight With Dream (Kawasaki Remix)"	Hayabusa	3:11

== Theme of the F: FMW Official Theme Song CD 2nd ==
Theme of the F: FMW Official Theme Song 2nd

Compilation album by Frontier Martial-Arts Wrestling
- Released: June 26, 1996
- Recorded: 1995–1996
- Genres: Jpop; Rock
- Labels: Toshiba EMI; FMW Productions

Dead or Alive: FMW Official Theme Song 2nd was the third compilation album by Frontier Martial-Arts Wrestling, featuring theme songs of FMW wrestlers. The album was released on June 26, 1996.

=== Track listing ===
No.	Title	Subject	Length
1.	"One Way Heart"	Megumi Kudo	3:49
2.	"D-A-N-G-A-N"	Masato Tanaka	3:48
3.	"The Master"	Hisakatsu Oya	4:42
4.	"Get!"	FMW Women's Theme	3:08
5.	"Sexy Storm"	Ricky Fuji	3:10
6.	"He is Awesome"	The Gladiator	4:15
7.	"Final Road"	7th Anniversary Show	3:14

== Dead or Alive: FMW Official Theme Song CD 3rd ==
Dead or Alive: FMW Official Theme Song 3rd

Compilation album by Frontier Martial-Arts Wrestling
- Released: September 26, 1997
- Recorded: 1995–1997
- Genres: Jpop; Rock
- Labels: Toshiba EMI; FMW Productions

Dead or Alive: FMW Official Theme Song 3rd was the fourth compilation album by Frontier Martial-Arts Wrestling, featuring theme songs of various FMW wrestlers. The album was released on September 26, 1997.

=== Track listing ===
No.	Title	Subject	Length
1.	"Fight With Dream II"	Hayabusa	3:29
2.	"Hit Man"	Koji Nakagawa	4:10
3.	"Street Fighter"	Tetsuhiro Kuroda	3:16
4.	"Lonely Girl"	Kaori Nakayama	3:20
5.	"Danger Zone" (W*ING Edit – performed by Kenny Loggins)	W*ING Kanemura	3:57
6.	"Bad Boy"	Hido	4:28
7.	"Wilder"	Hideki Hosaka	2:43
8.	"Face of the Dead"	Super Leather	3:48
9.	"Sound of War"	The Headhunters	3:49
10.	"Kishindo"	Mr. Gannosuke	2:52
11.	"Mad Dog"	Shark Tsuchiya	3:10
12.	"Wild Thing" (FMW Edit – performed by X)	Atsushi Onita	3:43

== FMW Entertainment Music - Official Theme Song CD Best ==
FMW Entertainment Music - Official Theme Song CD Best

Compilation album by Frontier Martial-Arts Wrestling
- Released: November 17, 1999
- Genres: Jpop; Rock
- Labels: Toshiba EMI; FMW Productions

FMW Entertainment Music - Official Theme Song CD Best was the fifth and final compilation album of Frontier Martial-Arts Wrestling featuring new theme songs of wrestlers as well as a few theme songs which had been featured in the previous albums as well.

=== Track listing ===
No.	Title	Subject	Length
1.	"Team FMW"	FMW Theme	4:30
2.	"Silver Resistance"	H	3:11
3.	"D-A-N-G-A-N"	Masato Tanaka	3:49
4.	"Street Fighter (Saikou Version)"	Tetsuhiro Kuroda	3:15
5.	"Sexy Storm"	Ricky Fuji	3:10
6.	"Wilder"	Hideki Hosaka	2:41
7.	"Hollywood Tropicana"	Flying Kid Ichihara and Sena Wakana	2:22
8.	"Lonely Girl"	Kaori Nakayama	3:18
9.	"Get!"	FMW Women's Theme	3:09
10.	"Fight With Dream II"	Hayabusa	3:26
11.	"Welcome to Darkside"	Darkside of Hayabusa	3:58
12.	"Shoot It '95"	Kodo Fuyuki	4:19
13.	"Kishindo"	Mr. Gannosuke	2:51
14.	"Sharp Dressed Man" (Performed by Bloods)	Jado & Gedo	4:16
15.	"Come Out and Play" (FMW Edit – performed by The Offspring)	Kintaro Kanemura	3:17
16.	"One Way Heart (Ballad Version)"	Megumi Kudo	4:53
