= Shōji (given name) =

- Gender: Male

Shōji, Shoji, Shouji or Shohji is a masculine Japanese given name written with various kanji (正治, 昌二, 昭二, 鐘史 etc.). Notable people with the name include:

- Shoji Akiyoshi (秋吉 昭二; born 1968), Japanese wrestler
- Shoji Azuma (東 照二; born 1956), Japanese sociolinguist, ski instructor, author and Professor
- Shoji Gatoh (賀東 招二; born 1971), Japanese author and anime screenwriter
- Shōji Hamada (濱田 庄司; 1894–1978), Japanese potter
- Shoji Hashimoto (橋本 昌二; 1935–2009), Japanese professional Go player
- Shōji Hayashi (林 昌二; 1928–2011), Japanese architect
- Shoji Ikitsu (生津 将司; born 1977), Japanese former football player
- Shoji Ito (伊藤 鐘史; born 1980), Japanese rugby union player
- Shoji Jo (城 彰二; born 1975), Japanese former professional footballer
- Shoji Kamata (鎌田 正司; born 1935), Japanese basketball player
- Shoji Kameda (born 1976), Japanese American musician and composer
- Shōji Kawamori (河森 正治; born 1960), Japanese anime creator
- Shoji Kikuchi (born 1944), Japanese professional golfer
- Shōji Kojima (小島 章司; born 1939), Japanese flamenco dancer
- Shoji Kokami (鴻上 尚史; born 1958), Japanese playwright, director, actor and filmmaker
- Shōji Maitachi (舞立 昇治; born 1975), Japanese politician
- Shoji Meguro (目黒 将司; born 1971), Japanese composer, guitarist, and video game designer
- Shōji Nakayama (中山 昭二; 1928–1998), Japanese film actor
- Shoji Nishida (西田 昌司; born 1958), Japanese politician
- Shoji Nishida (House of Representatives) (西田 昭二; born 1969), Japanese politician
- Shoji Nishikawa (西尾 昭二; 1927–2005), Japanese aikido teacher
- Shōji Nishimura (西村 祥治; 1899–1944), Japanese Imperial Navy admiral
- Shoji Nishio (西川 正治; 1884–1952), Japanese physicist
- Shoji Nonoshita (埜下 荘司; born 1970), Japanese former football player
- Shoji Oguma (大熊 正二; born 1951), Japanese former professional boxer
- Shōji Ōtake (大竹 省二; 1920-2015), Japanese photographer
- Shoji Sadao (貞尾 昭二; 1927–2019), Japanese American architect
- Shouji Saeki (佐伯 昭志; born 1971), Japanese director, storyboard artist, writer and animator
- Shōji Satō (佐藤 翔冶; born 1982), Japanese retired badminton player
- Shōji Satō (artist) (佐藤 ショウジ), Japanese manga artist and illustrator
- Shōji Segawa (瀬川 晶司; born 1970), Japanese shogi player
- Shoji Shiba (司馬 正次; born 1933), Japanese Total Quality Management
- Shōji Shimazaki (1905-1982), birth name of Takashi Shimura, Japanese actor
- Shoji Suzuki (鈴木 章治; 1932–1995), Japanese jazz clarinet player
- Shoji Tabuchi (田淵 章二; 1944–2023), Japanese-American country music fiddler and singer
- Shoji Tomihisa, Japanese track and field athlete
- Shoji Toyama (唐山 翔自; born 2002), Japanese footballer
- Shōji Tōyama (遠山 奨志; born 1967), Japanese former baseball pitcher and coach
- Shoji Uchida (内田 正二; born 1949), Japanese modern pentathlete
- Shōji Ueda (植田 正治; 1913–2000), Japanese photographer
- Shoji Ueda (cinematographer) (上田 正治; 1938–2025), Japanese cinematographer
- Shōji Yamagishi (山岸 章二; 1930–1979), Japanese photography critic, curator, and magazine editor
- Shōji Yasui (安井 昌二; 1928–2014), Japanese actor
- Shōji Yonemura (米村 正二; born 1964), Japanese writer
- Shoji Yoshio (吉尾 詔ニ; born 1943), Japanese sprint canoeist
- Shoji Yuki (结城 昭二; born 1950), Japanese basketball player
