= Shoji (disambiguation) =

Shoji or Shōji may refer to:

- Shōji, a type of Japanese room partition with a wooden frame holding a wooden or bamboo grid
- Shōji (era), a Japanese era name spanning the years from April 1199 through February 1201
- Shōji (given name), a masculine Japanese given name

== People with the surname ==
- Koichi Shoji (庄司浩一; 1955–2019), Japanese murderer
- Nanase Shoji (庄司 七瀬; born 1989), Japanese rhythmic gymnast
- Tarō Shōji, a Japanese ryūkōka singer
- Toshihiko Shoji (庄司 敏彦; 1909–?), Japanese ice hockey player
- Yoshihiro Shoji (庄司 悦大; born 1989), Japanese footballer
- Yuki Shōji (庄司 夕起; born 1981), Japanese volleyball player

== See also ==
- 昭二 (disambiguation)
