= Mr. Gannosuke =

Japanese professional wrestler

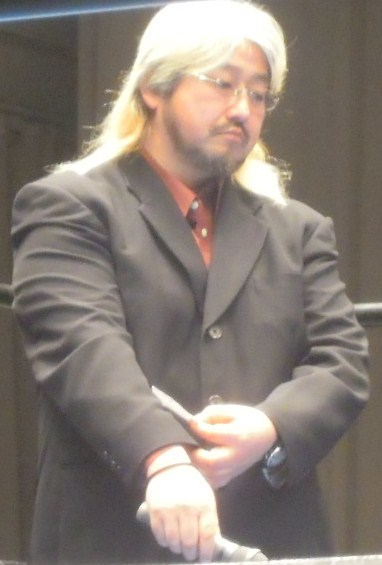
- Mr. Gannosuke in March 2011.

Personal information
- Born: Masashi Honda; June 20, 1968 (age 58) Nagasaki-shi, Nagasaki, Japan

Professional wrestling career
- Ring name(s): Gannosuke Honda; Mr. Gannosuke; Hayabusa; Masashi Honda; Riki Ganshu
- Billed height: 1.78 m (5 ft 10 in)
- Billed weight: 100 kg (220 lb)
- Trained by: Takashi Ishikawa; Tarzan Goto
- Debut: November 2, 1987 (Note: FMW's website has officially listed Gannosuke's debut as November 2, 1987, although most of the sources have recorded his debut as June 22, 1991.)
- Retired: April 15, 2018

Masashi Honda (本田雅史, Honda Masashi; born June 20, 1968) is a Japanese retired professional wrestler. He is best known for his work in Frontier Martial-Arts Wrestling (FMW) under the ring name Mr. Gannosuke (ミスター雁之助, Misutā Gannosuke).

Honda was quickly pushed as "Mr. Gannosuke" due to his resemblance to the actor Ashiya Gannosuke and he began competing as Atsushi Onita's tag team partner in main event matches during his rookie year. He left the company in 1995 with his trainer Tarzan Goto due to differences with Onita and worked in International Wrestling Association (IWA) for nearly two years. He returned to FMW in 1997 and became the main rival of Hayabusa for the next four years. He was the company's most popular villain from 1997 to 1998 and the second top villain from then onwards. He would be a member of villainous groups Funk Masters of Wrestling, ZEN, Team No Respect and Shin Fuyuki-gun.

He held many titles in his FMW career including being a one-time Brass Knuckles Heavyweight Champion and a two-time Independent Heavyweight Champion. He was also the winner of Over the Top tournament in 1999. He headlined many pay-per-view events for FMW including the company's flagship event Anniversary Show in 1998, 1999 and 2001.

== Early life ==
Masashi Honda was born in Nagasaki-shi, Nagasaki, Japan on June 20, 1968. He was a fan of professional wrestling since childhood and grew up watching New Japan Pro-Wrestling (NJPW). Honda idolized Riki Choshu as his favorite wrestler and decided to follow in his footsteps and become a professional wrestler. He joined Kumamoto University in 1987 and excelled in weight training, where he befriended Eiji Ezaki and the two trained for a professional wrestling career.

== Professional wrestling career ==
=== Early years (1987–1991) ===
Honda made his wrestling debut while in college on a student wrestling event on November 2, 1987, teaming with Eiji Ezaki against three upper classmen. They would cut their teeth on the small Japanese independent circuit for four years, before applying for the upstart promotion Frontier Martial-Arts Wrestling (FMW) in 1991.

=== Frontier Martial-Arts Wrestling (1991–1995) ===
In February 1991, Ezaki and Honda joined the FMW Dojo, where they were trained by Tarzan Goto. Ezaki would debut for FMW in May and Honda made his FMW debut a month later as a fan favorite against Akihito Ichihara on June 22, which Honda lost. He and Ezaki wrestled as a low-card tag team during the early matches of his career and against each other on the cards and would be utilized as preliminary talents, being used to lose against more established stars. Honda picked up his first win in FMW against Ezaki on June 26. The duo competed against each other in the opening match of the 2nd Anniversary Show, which Ezaki won. The following month, on October 14, Honda picked up his first major victory by winning a thirteen-man battle royal by last eliminating The Gladiator. His battle royal win elevated him to the upper mid-card while also competing in few main event matches as Atsushi Onita's partner. On October 22, Honda changed his ring name to Mr. Gannosuke, a nickname first given to him by his trainer Tarzan Goto during his training days due to Honda's resemblance to actor Ashiya Gannosuke. He would team with Onita in numerous street fights and deathmatches by the end of his rookie year.

He suffered an injury in the fall of 1991 and returned to FMW on January 5, 1992, losing to Kevin Sullivan. Gannosuke suffered another injury on July 28 and was sidelined for the rest of the year. He returned on January 5, 1993, where he lost to Koji Nakagawa in the opening match of the show. A third injury ensued during a tag team match on April 23 when he and Atsushi Onita lost to Big Titan and The Gladiator after Gladiator punched hard in Gannosuke's jaw, thus breaking it. He returned to FMW on June 15 by defeating Eiji Ezaki. At Summer Spectacular, Gannosuke teamed with Sambo Asako to take on Big Titan and The Gladiator in a tag team match. Gannosuke pinned Gladiator by debuting his new finisher, the Gannosuke Clutch to gain a major upset win over Gladiator. In early 1994, Gannosuke was paired with his mentor Tarzan Goto in a tournament for the new Brass Knuckles Tag Team Championship. They defeated Sabu and Damian in the quarter-final, a Barbed Wire Street Fight and the team of Mr. Pogo and Goro Tsurumi in the semi-final, a Barbed Wire Deathmatch and then lost to Big Titan and The Gladiator in a No Ropes Barbed Wire Deathmatch in the final of Block A. They would be moved to the losing teams' Block B, where they were defeated by Atsushi Onita and Katsutoshi Niiyama in the final of Block B, a No Ropes Barbed Wire Deathmatch. Gannosuke would then team with Sambo Asako to defeat Goro Tsurumi and Hideki Hosaka at 5th Anniversary Show.

Gannosuke began elevating his status in the summer of 1994 by picking up a major victory against Sambo Asako at Summer Spectacular. He then joined forces with Atsushi Onita and his allies to feud with the upstart faction W*ING Alliance. On November 23, the team of Gannosuke, Onita and Katsutoshi Niiyama took on W*ING members Mr. Pogo, Yukihiro Kanemura and The Gladiator in a Penalty Box Elimination No Ropes Barbed Wire Street Fight Deathmatch, during which Gannosuke was eliminated by Gladiator and suffered an injury, which put him out of action for nearly two months. He returned to FMW on January 5, 1995, where he teamed with FMW fellows Tarzan Goto, Katsutoshi Niiyama and Tetsuhiro Kuroda against W*ING's Mr. Pogo, The Gladiator, Yukihiro Kanemura and Hisakatsu Oya in a losing effort. A month later, on February 24, Gannosuke won his first championship, the Brass Knuckles Tag Team Championship with Onita by defeating Mr. Pogo and The Gladiator. They dropped the title to Pogo and Yukihiro Kanemura on March 7. Gannosuke and his mentor Tarzan Goto no-showed the April 22 event, and the following day, the two along with Flying Kid Ichihara announced that they were leaving FMW due to Goto's refusal of losing to Onita at 6th Anniversary Show. This also led Gannosuke and Katsutoshi Niiyama's scheduled match against Hisakatsu Oya and Ricky Fuji at the event to be cancelled.

=== Big Japan Pro Wrestling and International Wrestling Association of Japan (1995–1996) ===
Upon leaving FMW, Tarzan Goto, Mr. Gannosuke and Flying Kid Ichihara joined the upstart deathmatch wrestling promotion Big Japan Pro Wrestling (BJW), where they debuted on May 30 with a win over Kendo Nagasaki, Giant Korean and Kim Soppo. They soon left BJW and joined International Wrestling Association of Japan in July, where the trio formed a stable Shin-FMW and were heavily pushed as the company's top villains. Gannosuke and Tarzan Goto also made an appearance for Wrestle Association R's 3rd Anniversary Show, where the duo defeated Jado and Gedo. At IWA Japan's Kawasaki Dream, Gannosuke participated in the well received King of the Deathmatch tournament, losing to Tiger Jeet Singh in a Barbed Wire Board and Chain Deathmatch in the quarter-final round. On October 1, Gannosuke and Tarzan Goto defeated Cactus Jack and Tracy Smothers to win the World Tag Team Championship. On December 9, Gannosuke and Goto defeated Jack and Tiger Jeet Singh in the final of a tag team tournament to win the vacant NWA World Tag Team Championship and held both sets of tag team championships. Despite holding two sets of tag team titles, IWA Japan lost tons of money and suspended operations. Shin-FMW left the company in October 1996, forcing Gannosuke and Goto to vacate both titles.

=== Tokyo Pro Wrestling (1996) ===
Shin-FMW also made a few appearances in Tokyo Pro Wrestling (TPW) during their time in IWA Japan in mid-1996. The ill-fated promotion closed down after producing its last event on December 7.

=== Return to FMW ===
==== Funk Masters of Wrestling and ZEN (1997) ====
On January 5, 1997, Mr. Gannosuke and Flying Kid Ichihara returned to FMW, confronting Hayabusa, upset that Hayabusa did not leave FMW with him in 1995. Gannosuke and Ichihara established themselves as villains and joined Terry Funk's Funk Masters of Wrestling. This marked the beginning of a historic and long-lasting rivalry between Gannosuke and Hayabusa. Gannosuke made his in-ring return to FMW on February 18 as he and Hisakatsu Oya defeated the team of Hayabusa and Ricky Fuji. Gannosuke went on a vicious streak, defeating other wrestlers and calling them victories over Hayabusa. At 8th Anniversary Show, Gannosuke wrestled Hayabusa in their first singles encounter, a mask vs. hair match, which Hayabusa won. However, Hayabusa suggested to Gannosuke that he would not cut his hair if Gannosuke left Funk Masters of Wrestling and Hayabusa initiated a handshake but Gannosuke attacked him and ripped off his mask and attempted to blow a fireball on Hayabusa before Jinsei Shinzaki made the save. This led to Gannosuke, wearing a purple Hayabusa mask, attacked Shinzaki with a stick during Shinzaki's entrance before a match at a Michinoku Pro Wrestling (MPW) show on June 21. He then proceeded to burn Hayabusa's mask and also beginning to feud with Shinzaki.

On August 5, Mr. Gannosuke won the World Street Fight 6-Man Tag Team Championship with Funk Masters of Wrestling teammates Hisakatsu Oya and The Gladiator by defeating Hayabusa, Ricky Fuji and Koji Nakagawa in the quarter-final and Fuyuki-Gun (Kodo Fuyuki, Jado, and Gedo) in the final. Two weeks later, on August 21, Gannosuke and Oya defeated W*ING Kanemura and Hido to win the Brass Knuckles Tag Team Championship. On August 31, Funk Masters of Wrestling lost the World Street Fight 6-Man Tag Team Championship to Hayabusa, Masato Tanaka and Koji Nakagawa. At Kawasaki Legend: Fall Spectacular, Gannosuke and Oya successfully defended the Brass Knuckles Tag Team Championship against Jado and Gedo. On October 14, Gannosuke defeated Jinsei Shinzaki after attacking him from behind. During this time, he got over with the fans as the company's top villain due to getting heel heat after the departure of Terry Funk. On October 19, Gannosuke and Oya lost the Brass Knuckles Tag Team Championship to ZEN's Atsushi Onita and Yukihiro Kanemura. After losing the title, Gannosuke and Oya left Funk Masters of Wrestling and jumped to ZEN. Two days later, Gannosuke and Oya defeated The Gladiator and Super Leather after Gladiator attacked Leather and abandoned Funk Masters of Wrestling.

On November 28, Gannosuke teamed with his ZEN teammate Yukihiro Kanemura and they defeated Hayabusa and Masato Tanaka to win the vacant Brass Knuckles Tag Team Championship and the two formed a very successful tag team, even surpassing their leader Atsushi Onita as the top villains of FMW due to them getting the biggest heel heat from the crowd. Friction arose within ZEN as Onita put himself in the main event of the December 19 show in the Super Extreme Wrestling War tour against Masato Tanaka, instead of Gannosuke and Kanemura's Brass Knuckles Tag Team Championship defense against Hayabusa and Jinsei Shinzaki, which the duo felt deserved to be the main event of the show and it led to a heated argument between Gannosuke and Onita. Gannosuke and Kanemura successfully defended the title against Hayabusa and Shinzaki. On the final day of the tour on December 22, the team of Onita, Gannosuke and Kanemura took on Hayabusa, Jinsei Shinzaki and Masato Tanaka in a WarGames match, during which Gannosuke and Kanemura showed tactics of dissension with Onita and turned on Onita after Onita was pinned by Hayabusa. They attacked Onita until Koji Nakagawa made the rescue and then Gannosuke, Kanemura and Hido left ZEN to form their own freelance group alongside Miss Mongol. This led Onita to turn fan favorite and Gannosuke cemented his place as the top villain of FMW.

==== Double Champion and Gannosuke's Outlaws (1998–1999) ====
Impressed by Honda due to his heel heat and increasing popularity, FMW's head booker Go Ito pushed Gannosuke as the company's top main event star. On January 6, 1998, Gannosuke defeated Masato Tanaka to win the FMW Double Championship (the unified Brass Knuckles Heavyweight Championship and the Independent Heavyweight Championship) to claim his first world championship reigns. A day later, Gannosuke, Yukihiro Kanemura and Hido took on Atsushi Onita, Koji Nakagawa and Tetsuhiro Kuroda in a street fight at ZEN's first promoted show. Gannosuke's team lost the match, but they attacked ZEN after the match and Fuyuki-Gun joined Gannosuke's group in the assault and the two factions subsequently merged to form Team No Respect, with Gannosuke becoming the leader of the group. On January 16, Gannosuke, Kanemura and Jado defeated Hayabusa, Masato Tanaka and Hisakatsu Oya to win the World Street Fight 6-Man Tag Team Championship. Gannosuke began mocking Jinsei Shinzaki by appearing in his outfit and using Shinzaki's mannerisms and moves during his matches. On February 13, Gannosuke's team lost the World Street Fight 6-Man Tag Team Championship to ZEN's Atsushi Onita, Koji Nakagawa and Tetsuhiro Kuroda. On March 29, Gannosuke and Kanemura lost the Brass Knuckles Tag Team Championship to TNR teammates Kodo Fuyuki and Hido. On April 21, Gannosuke lost to Jinsei Shinzaki to end their year-lasting feud. The following week, Gannosuke lost the Double Championship to his rival Hayabusa at FMW's first pay-per-view event 9th Anniversary Show: Entertainment Wrestling Live on April 30. During the match, Gannosuke dislocated his knee, which required reconstructive surgery and to be out of action for six months and then Kodo Fuyuki took over as the leader of Team No Respect.

Gannosuke made his first appearance since losing the title on May 25 for a Brief Brothers skit with Yukihiro Kanemura, during which the two began to bicker with each other. He would then make an appearance in Jinsei Shinzaki's outfit at Welcome to the Darkside pay-per-view on August 22, where he cost The Darkside of Hayabusa, a match against Koji Nakagawa, who had joined TNR during Gannosuke's injury. He made his full-time return on October 6 after Tetsuhiro Kuroda defeated Yukihiro Kanemura and began praying instead of shaking hands with Kuroda, which set up a match between Gannosuke and Kuroda on November 20, where Gannosuke made his in-ring return and defeated Kuroda. After the match, Kanemura confronted Gannosuke on his allegiance to TNR but Gannosuke did not answer and simply walked away, thus quietly leaving Team No Respect. He then entered the Over the Top Tournament to determine the #1 contender for the Double Championship on March 19, 1999. Gannosuke defeated Koji Nakagawa in the first round, Yukihiro Kanemura in the quarter-final, Hido in the semi-final and Hisakatsu Oya in the final round of the tournament on January 5, 1999, to become the #1 contender for the titles and earn the title shot.

Following his tournament victory, Gannosuke formed a group with Hideki Hosaka and Super Leather called Gannosuke's Outlaws, which became the top villainous group in FMW due to Team No Respect turning into fan favorites. Gannosuke gained his first singles win over Hayabusa on February 21. On February 27, Hisakatsu Oya turned on Hayabusa during a match against Gannosuke and Hosaka and then Oya joined Gannosuke's Outlaws and then received his title shot against Kodo Fuyuki for the Double Championship on March 19, where he failed to win the title. Gannosuke would then team with Oya to participate in a round robin tournament for the vacant Brass Knuckles Tag Team Championship. They scored eight points in the tournament and were eliminated from the tournament. They subsequently began feuding with Daisuke Ikeda and Muhammad Yone after losing to them in a tournament match on March 29. Gannosuke and Oya defeated Ikeda and Yone in a rematch on May 3. Later in the show, Gannosuke's Outlaws and Team No Respect formed an alliance as TNR helped Gannosuke's Outlaws in laying out an assault on Daisuke Ikeda. Two days later, on May 5, the combined alliance of Gannosuke's Outlaws and Team No Respect defeated Battlarts' team in an elimination tag team match.

==== Team No Respect reunion (1999) ====
Later in the show, Gannosuke showed up during Kodo Fuyuki's Double Championship title defense against Tetsuhiro Kuroda and reunited Team No Respect as all the members of TNR began dancing to TNR's theme song Come Out and Play. The group helped Fuyuki in retaining the title against Kuroda, resulting in Gannosuke ending Gannosuke's Outlaws and rejoining TNR. On May 18, Fuyuki split the Double Championship and awarded the Independent Heavyweight Championship to Gannosuke. Despite holding the title, Gannosuke's status dwindled from a main eventer to being Fuyuki's assistant along with the rest of TNR. He participated in a six-man tag team tournament with Yukihiro Kanemura and Jado for the new WEW 6-Man Tag Team Championship. The trio scored three points in the tournament, thus directly qualifying for the semi-final on July 31 pay-per-view during the Goodbye Hayabusa tour, where they would lose to the team of Hayabusa, Masato Tanaka and Tetsuhiro Kuroda.

Gannosuke dropped the Independent Heavyweight Championship to Masato Tanaka at Haunted House. The match was well received and voted FMW's Match of the Year of 1999. Two days later, at Hayabusa Graduation Ceremony, Gannosuke and Jado defeated Flying Kid Ichihara and Naohiko Yamazaki. Gannosuke would then wrestle Hayabusa at Last Match in the last match of Eiji Ezaki's Hayabusa character, challenging Hayabusa for the Brass Knuckles Heavyweight Championship. Hayabusa retained the title and it would be the last match for the Brass Knuckles Heavyweight Championship as the title, along with the Independent Heavyweight Championship would be retired in favor of the new WEW Single Championship. On August 27, Hayabusa debuted his new character H in an elimination tag team match against Team No Respect, during which H injured Gannosuke's knee, reminiscent of Hayabusa injuring him the previous year at 9th Anniversary Show.

The following week, on September 3, Honda appeared in Hayabusa's attire and mask and attacked H during a six-man tag team match and proclaimed that he was the real Hayabusa. Gannosuke would then use Hayabusa's entrance theme and compete as Hayabusa and embarrassed H by filming a porn video with Chocoball Mukai as Hayabusa. This led to an anus explosion match between H and Hayabusa on October 29, which ended in a no contest after Hayabusa handcuffed H to the corner and blew a firecracker in between his buttocks to cause it to explode. Honda would then go through an identity crisis in storyline if he was Hayabusa, Masashi Honda or Mr. Gannosuke. H and Hayabusa competed in the main event of the 10th Anniversary Show on November 23 in a match, in which Shawn Michaels served as the special guest referee. During the match, Hayabusa had enough of the identity crisis and he removed his mask to compete as Gannosuke. H won the match and after the match, H and Hayabusa finally made peace by making friends with each other and ending their rivalry and as a result, Gannosuke turned fan favorite for the first time since 1995.

==== Teaming and feuding with Hayabusa (1999–2001) ====
Gannosuke's transition into a fan favorite led to him to quit Team No Respect and he formed a tag team with H. On December 1, H and Gannosuke defeated Tetsuhiro Kuroda and Hisakatsu Oya to capture the WEW World Tag Team Championship. In the meanwhile, Masato Tanaka became upset at H forgiving Gannosuke so easily and forming a team with him and did not celebrate with them after the trio defeated Team No Respect members Kintaro Kanemura, Koji Nakagawa and Gedo in a match on December 3. H and Gannosuke successfully defended their title against Tetsuhiro Kuroda and Hisakatsu Oya on December 11. On December 12, H and Gannosuke defeated Kuroda and Tanaka in a match and after the match, Tanaka refused to shake H and Gannosuke's hands while Kuroda shook their hands. On January 5, 2000, Gannosuke, H, Hisakatsu Oya and Ricky Fuji represented FMW against the ECW Japan team of Kodo Fuyuki, Kyoko Inoue, Balls Mahoney and Pitbull #1, which FMW's team lost. On January 7, H and Gannosuke lost a match to Fuyuki and Inoue, setting up a title defense of the WEW Tag Team Championship against Fuyuki and Inoue on February 25, where H and Gannosuke lost the title. Honda would then take time off and returned to FMW on April 11 to team with H against ECW Japan's Masato Tanaka and Balls Mahoney. H was injured early in the match and then returned as Hayabusa by the end of the match but Gannosuke's team still lost the match. At 11th Anniversary Show: Backdraft, Gannosuke represented FMW against ECW Japan's Sabu and the match ended in a no contest after Gannosuke blew a fireball on Sabu.

Gannosuke would shortly after injure his leg and wore a cast and a crutch on his leg. On May 28, Gannosuke competed against H and Tetsuhiro Kuroda in a three-way dance to determine the #1 contender for the WEW World Heavyweight Championship, with champion Kodo Fuyuki as the special guest referee. Gannosuke turned on H by hitting him with his crutch after H eliminated Kuroda and then Gannosuke defeated H, with Fuyuki's help and turned into a villain. He then joined Fuyuki's new group Shin Fuyuki-Gun. Gannosuke kidnapped Ricky Fuji on June 6 and held him hostage in a forest and threatened to blow him if H and his partner did not defeat Kodo Fuyuki and GOEMON on June 16. H and his partner Hayabusa would win the match but the explosion still occurred and it was revealed that Gannosuke and Fuji had left the spot before the explosion. On July 28, Gannosuke kidnapped Ricky Fuji once again from a restaurant with the help of Flying Kid Ichihara but Fuji would escape after Gannosuke made Ichihara incharge, who then left. On July 28, the team of Gannosuke, Kodo Fuyuki and Jinsei Shinzaki lost to Hayabusa, Masato Tanaka and Hisakatsu Oya after Shinzaki turned on his team. Gannosuke renewed his rivalry with Hayabusa and the two competed against each other in a match on August 28, which Gannosuke lost.

On September 15, the team of Mr. Gannosuke, Kodo Fuyuki and new Shin Fuyuki-Gun recruit Shinjuku Shark defeated H, Tetsuhiro Kuroda and Hisakatsu Oya to win the WEW 6-Man Tag Team Championship. Two days later, they lost the titles to Jado, Gedo and Kaori Nakayama when Fuyuki was pinned by Nakayama. Gannosuke began growing upset at his teammates. On September 26, Gannosuke and GOEMON defeated Tetsuhiro Kuroda and Onryo in a match where a baseball player interfered on Kuroda's behalf. Later at the show, Gannosuke confronted FMW President Shoichi Arai on the direction that FMW was going through and had turned from a deathmatch wrestling federation to a joke for the sake of sports entertainment and after Arai refused to listen to him, Gannosuke attacked him, which led Arai to fire him from FMW. Gannosuke began feuding with Kuroda by costing him a match against Chocoball Mukai on October 7 and against Gedo on October 29, leading to Arai allowing Gannosuke to compete in a match against Kuroda at Deep Throat, which stipulated that Gannosuke would be reinstated if he won but he would be forced to retire if he lost. Gannosuke would lose the match and retired in storyline. In reality, he needed time off due to the birth of his daughter. Gannosuke made an appearance on December 20 under his real name Masashi Honda and provided color commentary for the main event match along with the injured Hayabusa. In the meanwhile, Tetsuhiro Kuroda had turned heel and joined Shin Fuyuki-Gun.

Honda returned to FMW on April 1, 2001, and introduced his protégé Banji Takada, who would lose to Yoshihito Sasaki. Honda shook hands with Sasaki and teased a face turn, which led Shoichi Arai to reinstate him as a wrestler. Later that night, Gannosuke helped Tetsuhiro Kuroda to defeat Kodo Fuyuki for the WEW World Heavyweight Championship by hitting Fuyuki with a chair and turned into a villain. Gannosuke became a member of Kuroda's Team Kuroda group and aligned himself with Kuroda in his feud with Hayabusa and The Great Sasuke. Gannosuke made his in-ring return on April 15 by teaming with Mammoth Sasaki and Tetsuhiro Kuroda to defeat The Great Sasuke, GOEMON and Onryo. Kuroda and Gannosuke competed against Hayabusa and Sasuke in an Exploding 15000 Volt Thunderbolt Octagon Cage Bomb Deathmatch at 12th Anniversary Show, which Kuroda and Gannosuke lost. On May 22, Gannosuke and Mammoth Sasaki unsuccessfully challenged GOEMON and Onryo for the WEW World Tag Team Championship. On June 8, Kodo Fuyuki announced that he had sold his stock to Tokyopop and wanted to sell FMW to Tokyopop and gave the FMW roster, a choice to side either with him or Shoichi Arai. Gannosuke opted to side with Fuyuki while Kuroda sided with Arai and turned face, leading to the breakup of Team Kuroda. Later that night, Gannosuke teamed with Kintaro Kanemura and the duo defeated Hayabusa and Kuroda in the night's main event. Gannosuke would then be allied with Fuyuki and feud with Hayabusa and the FMW team.

On July 2, Gannosuke introduced his new on-screen girlfriend Mirei to FMW. On July 30, Gannosuke, Kodo Fuyuki and Kintaro Kanemura defeated Hisakatsu Oya, Ricky Fuji and Flying Kid Ichihara to capture the WEW 6-Man Tag Team Championship. On August 11, Gannosuke defeated Kanemura to gain a lead for Tokyopop in a three-match series between FMW and Tokyopop with the ownership of FMW on the line. Later that night, Hayabusa lost the WEW World Heavyweight Championship to Kintaro Kanemura, which led to Tokyopop gaining the ownership of FMW. On September 5, Gannosuke and Mammoth Sasaki defeated GOEMON and Onryo to win the WEW World Tag Team Championship. On September 9, Gannosuke, Fuyuki and Kanemura lost the WEW 6-Man Tag Team Championship to Hayabusa, Tetsuhiro Kuroda and GOEMON. The following month, on October 9, Gannosuke and Sasaki lost the WEW World Tag Team Championship to Hayabusa and Tetsuhiro Kuroda.

==== Final feuds (2001–2002) ====
Gannosuke got involved in a feud between his on-screen girlfriend Mirei and Makiko over the affections of Gannosuke. On November 5, Gannosuke turned fan favorite by cutting a worked shoot promo in which he showed support for Hayabusa, who had been recently injured on October 22. On November 23, Makiko defeated Mirei in an evening gown match for Gannosuke. Later at the show, Gannosuke teamed with Mammoth Sasaki as the two defeated Biomonster DNA and Dr. Luther to win their second WEW World Tag Team Championship. Later that night, they vacated the titles and joined forces with Tetsuhiro Kuroda and Kintaro Kanemura to feud with Kodo Fuyuki who had turned on FMW to align himself with Genichiro Tenryu's WAR alliance. On December 9, the FMW alliance defeated WAR's team of Tenryu, Fuyuki, Arashi and Koki Kitahara to win the feud.

On December 21, Gannosuke teamed with Tetsuhiro Kuroda to participate in a tournament for the vacant WEW World Tag Team Championship. They defeated GOEMON and Onryo in the quarter-final, Sabu and Yoshihito Sasaki in the semi-final and Kintaro Kanemura and Mammoth Sasaki in the final to win the tournament and the vacant title. On January 6, 2002, Gannosuke teamed with Tetsuhiro Kuroda and Mammoth Sasaki to take on Kodo Fuyuki's foreign alliance of The Sandman, Balls Mahoney and Vic Grimes. During the match, Gannosuke broke his both ankles after Grimes delivered a Moonsault on Gannosuke through a table. With both Hayabusa and Gannosuke out of action, FMW closed a month later on February 15 due to bankruptcy.

=== Wrestlings Marvelous Future ===
==== Brand Double Cross and The GUN's (2002–2003) ====
Gannosuke made his comeback to the ring for Hayabusa's new promotion Wrestlings Marvelous Future (WMF) at the pre-debut show on August 18, where he teamed with Garuda, Onryo and Ikeda-kun to defeat Ricky Fuji, GOEMON, Mammoth Sasaki and Soldier in an eight-man tag team match. He established himself as a fan favorite by teaming with Jinsei Shinzaki to defeat Tetsuhiro Kuroda and Hisakatsu Oya in the company's debut show The Independence Day. Gannosuke would initially feud with the Brand Double Cross faction. At Marvelous Days 1st, Gannosuke lost to Satoshi Kojima. On December 21, Gannosuke and Shinzaki took on Kuroda and GOEMON. The match ended in a no contest when Gannosuke turned on Shinzaki and became a villain as he aligned himself with GOEMON and GOEMON turned on Kuroda and took him out of Brand Double Cross, with Gannosuke then replacing Kuroda and joining the group as the newest member. Gannosuke would then begin a rivalry with Shinzaki as well as WMF's ace Mammoth Sasaki. On February 15, 2003, Gannosuke and Hisakatsu Oya lost a tag team match to Shinzaki and Sasaki.

On February 23, Gannosuke brought out Katsumi Hirano as "Hayabusa" and defeated Ricky Fuji and Tetsuhiro Kuroda. He then formed a group called The GUN's with Hirano as Mr. Iwaonosuke and Ichiro Yaguchi as Mr. Rocknosuke and both men modelled each other after Gannosuke. Gannosuke defeated Shinzaki in a match at Marvelous Days 2nd. Gannosuke began a rivalry with Mr. Pogo, which led to a street fight between the duo on May 11, which Gannosuke won. He would then lose a match to rival Mammoth Sasaki on May 24. At Marvelous Days 3rd on July 25, The GUN's lost a street fight to Kintaro Kanemura, Mammoth Sasaki and Tetsuhiro Kuroda in a match which stipulated that WMF would be forced to end if GUN's won. The loss marked the end of GUN's.

==== Various feuds (2003–2006) ====
Gannosuke formed a group called Apache Army with several fellow FMW alumni and various wrestlers from the Japanese independent circuit including Kintaro Kanemura, Hido, Taka Michinoku, Gentaro and Takashi Sasaki and the group would compete in various independent promotions. At WMF's 1st Anniversary Show, Gannosuke, Hido and Kanemura defeated Ikeda-kun, Mammoth Sasaki and Tetsuhiro Kuroda. At Marvelous Days 5th, the team of Gentaro, Kanemura and Gannosuke defeated Yuko Miyamoto, Mineo Fujita and Seiji Ikeda. At Marvelous Days 6th on November 20, Mammoth Sasaki brought Genichiro Tenryu as "Hayabusa" against Gannosuke and Hido in a street fight, which Gannosuke's team lost.

Gannosuke then got involved in Apache Army's feud with his idol Riki Choshu's Fighting World of Japan Pro Wrestling. At Marvelous Days 7th, Gannosuke would team with Chocoball Mukai and GOEMON as the trio lost to Koichiro Kimura, Ricky Fuji and Yoji Anjo. In 2004, it was announced that WMF would be closed down due to financial loss and the promotion held its final show Marvelous Days 8th on February 11, where Gannosuke challenged Kensuke Sasaki for the Hawai'i Championship Wrestling (HCW) Kamehameha Heritage World Heavyweight Championship in a losing effort. He then turned fan favorite as he ended his rivalry with Mammoth Sasaki as the two embraced and hugged each other and they announced that WMF was not ending and going on a hiatus instead as it marked the end of the promotion's Chapter 1 and it would return in the summer of 2004. The promotion returned on August 7, where Gannosuke teamed with GOEMON against Seiji Ikeda and Garuda in a losing effort on the occasion of the promotion's second anniversary. On August 29, Gannosuke defeated Ikeda on the second night of the promotion's second anniversary. In the fall of 2004, Gannosuke participated in the WMF Round Robin Tournament, in which he qualified for the semi-final round by scoring eight points and lost to Mammoth Sasaki in the semi-final on February 20, 2005.

Gannosuke would then represent WMF in a feud against Soldier, who brought his allies from International Wrestling Cartel (IWC). At Super Hardcore Night, Gannosuke teamed with Gosaku Goshogawara against Soldier and Balls Mahoney, which Gannosuke's team lost. At Kawagoe Decisive Battle, Gannosuke brought Kensuke Sasaki as his tag team partner against Soldier and Mahoney, with Gannosuke's team winning the match. Gannosuke began financing WMF personally after Laing, Inc. stopped financial support of the company. On July 31, Gannosuke defeated Mammoth Sasaki in a street fight to end their rivalry. In the fall of 2005, Gannosuke began feuding with Soldier and his new group New Generation Army, which aimed at eliminating old veteran wrestlers from WMF and giving place to new and young wrestlers and the two groups feuded with each other throughout 2006. In 2007, Gannosuke teamed with Soldier to participate in the Marvelous Future Tag Team Tournament, in which they defeated Onryo and Yuko Miyamoto in the quarter-final but lost to Mineo Fujita and Kitten Kid in the semi-final.

==== KHM Army (2007–2008) ====
On April 14, Gannosuke announced that he would compete as a freelancer on the Japanese independent circuit and refused Soldier's challenge for a singles match and thus denounced himself as a WMF wrestler. However, Gannosuke appeared on May 19 as the mystery tag team partner of GOEMON and Hideki Hosaka against the WMF team of Soldier, Mineo Fujita and Kengo Takai, during which Gannosuke turned villain and Fujita turned on Soldier, allowing Gannosuke to defeat Soldier for the victory. Gannosuke formed a group with Fujita, Hosaka, GOEMON, Leatherface and Yasu Orano called KHM as the top villainous group to feud with WMF. The KHM Army wrestled the WMF and feuded with the likes of Soldier and Kitten Kid throughout the year. On November 24, KHM Army defeated Kamui, Kankuro Hirano, Soldier and SYU in an elimination tag team match. However, KHM Army would lose a six-man tag team match against Kamui, Kitten Kid and Soldier on December 26. On February 17, 2008, Gannosuke announced that he was ending the KHM Army, which marked the end of the rivalry between KHM Army and WMF. Gannosuke announced his retirement at the end of the year and decided to end the WMF promotion and then quit the company. He returned to WMF for only one match against Kamui on July 27, which Gannosuke won. This was his last match in the WMF and he closed the promotion a month later on August 31.

=== Independent circuit (2002–2008) ===
After the closure of FMW, Honda primarily wrestled for its successor WMF, but also competed in the Japanese independent circuit. He was one of the founding members of Apache Army group, along with Kintaro Kanemura and several other wrestlers. Apache Army invaded Pro Wrestling Zero-One and the two sides battled each other during the fall of 2003 and early 2004. On December 25, Gannosuke and Tetsuhiro Kuroda defeated Jun Kasai and Tengu Kaiser to win the vacant All Asia Tag Team Championship. They lost the title to Great Kosuke and Shiryu at an All Japan Pro Wrestling show on January 2, 2004. In 2004, Apache Army began an interpromotional rivalry with Riki Choshu's Fighting World of Japan Pro Wrestling, which led to the group making appearances in WJ. Gannosuke was removed from Apache Army due to differences with Kintaro Kanemura and would then continue to focus on reviving his WMF promotion. He made frequent appearances in Kings Road, Muga World Pro Wrestling, Ice Ribbon, Dramatic Dream Team, Fuyuki Army Promotion, Guts World Pro Wrestling and also promoted his own shows under the "Kishindo" banner, named after his FMW theme song.

On January 10, 2005, Gannosuke appeared for a Big Japan Pro Wrestling show, where he mimicked his idol Riki Choshu as Riki Ganshu and teamed with Riki Sensyu to defeat Abdullah Kobayashi and Poison Julie Sawada by disqualification. On July 29, 2007, Gannosuke, SUZKI and Yuji Hino defeated Alexander Otsuka, Devilman Mystery and Masked Mystery to win the GWC Six-Man Tag Team Championship for Guts World Pro Wrestling. They lost the title to Yuki Sato, Dick Togo and Ryan Upin on October 21. On May 1, 2008, Gannosuke announced that he would retire from professional wrestling at the end of the year. During this time, Gannosuke reunited with various FMW wrestlers and was able to compete in the Apache Army promotion as well due to Kintaro Kanemura being expelled from Apache Army due to a sexual harassment scandal. He formed a stable with fellow FMW alumni Tetsuhiro Kuroda, Koji Nakagawa and Ricky Fuji called FMW Legends Army and the group feuded with the Apache Army stable. This rivalry led to Gannosuke taking on Mammoth Sasaki in a No Ropes Barbed Wire Deathmatch on October 10, which Gannosuke lost and then Gannosuke appreciated Sasaki on his performance and added him to his FMW Legends Army faction. On December 27, Gannosuke promoted his retirement show, where he teamed with Jinsei Shinzaki and Mammoth Sasaki to defeat Masato Tanaka, Tetsuhiro Kuroda and Kintaro Kanemura in a street fight.

=== Guts World Pro Wrestling (2014–2018) ===
After a six-year absence from the ring, Gannosuke signed a contract with Guts World Pro Wrestling and appeared as a ring announcer for a Guts World show on September 6, 2014. During the show, he was attacked by Masao Orihara after Orihara lost a match to Guts Ishijima and then Ishijima asked Gannosuke to come out of retirement and team with him to take on Orihara and a masked mystery partner at the promotion's 10th Anniversary Show the next month and Gannosuke tweeted the following day that he would be returning to the ring as a full-time wrestler for Guts World at the 10th Anniversary Show. Gannosuke made his in-ring return at 10th Anniversary Show, on October 12, where he teamed with Guts Ishijima to defeat Tonpachi Machine Guns (Masao Orihara and Masked Mystery Partner). In February 2015, Gannosuke and Ishijima participated in a tournament for the vacant GWC Tag Team Championship, in which they defeated Tsuneo Yoshie and Ultraman Robin in the quarter-final and Takumi Tsukamoto and The Winger in the semi-final and lost to Hattoshite Good in the final. On July 19, Gannosuke unsuccessfully challenged Daisuke for the GWC Single Championship. On March 22, 2016, Gannosuke defeated Tatsuhiko Yoshino to become the #1 contender for the title and then defeated Daisuke to win the title on May 8. He made his first successful title defense against Gentaro on June 17. He lost the title to Masked Mystery on September 11. Gannosuke held his retirement ceremony on April 15 at Guts World's final show, where he competed in his final wrestling match, teaming with Michio Kageyama against Tatsumi Fujinami and Hiro Saito in a losing effort. After the event, Honda closed Guts World Pro Wrestling and retired from wrestling.

=== Return to independent circuit (2015–2018) ===
Although primarily wrestling for Guts World Pro Wrestling, Mr. Gannosuke also wrestles on several independent promotions and promotes his own wrestling events under the Kishindo banner as well. He debuted for Pro Wrestling FREEDOMS on May 1, 2015, as a member of Kamui's reformed WMF Army by teaming with Onryo against Tatsuhito Takaiwa and Toru Sugiura. Gannosuke and Onryo won the match. Gannosuke continues to wrestle occasionally for FREEDOMS. He debuted for the resurrected FMW on March 22, 2017, at the occasion of the first anniversary of Hayabusa's death. Gannosuke teamed with Raijin Yaguchi, Tetsuhiro Kuroda and Tomohiko Hashimoto against Atsushi Onita, Hideki Hosaka, Mammoth Sasaki and Ricky Fuji in an eight-man tag team match, which Gannosuke's team lost. In 2018, Gannosuke announced his retirement from professional wrestling, promoting his last Kishindo Returns Final show on March 27, where he teamed with Hayabucha against Yuko Miyamoto and Isami Kodaka in a losing effort.

== Personal life ==
Although portrayed on screen as longtime rivals, Honda and Hayabusa (Eiji Ezaki) were good friends with each other. Honda is also friends with Kintaro Kanemura. Their friendship suffered in 2002 after the demise of FMW when Gannosuke lured away half of the FMW roster for his Wrestlings Marvelous Future (WMF) and refused to compete in Kodo Fuyuki's World Entertainment Wrestling (WEW) and Kanemura remained loyal to Fuyuki. In 2004, the two broke their friendship over combining their WMF and Fuyuki Army Promotions and Kanemura used his links to prevent Gannosuke from competing in other major promotions in Japan. They patched up in 2008 and Gannosuke convinced Kanemura to compete in his retirement match on December 27, 2008, which Kanemura accepted.

Gannosuke now promotes shows under his own name about every four months and is a trainer for Emi Sakura's Ice Ribbon promotion. He also runs his bar called Nov Bar every night.

== Championships and accomplishments ==
- All Japan Pro Wrestling

- All Asia Tag Team Championship (1 time) – with Tetsuhiro Kuroda

- Frontier Martial-Arts Wrestling / World Entertainment Wrestling

- FMW Brass Knuckles Heavyweight Championship (1 time)
- FMW Independent Heavyweight Championship (2 times)
- FMW Brass Knuckles Tag Team Championship (3 times) – with Atsushi Onita (1), Hisakatsu Oya (1), and Yukihiro Kanemura (1)
- FMW World Street Fight 6-Man Tag Team Championship (2 times) – with The Gladiator and Hisakatsu Oya (1), Yukihiro Kanemura and Jado (1)
- WEW 6-Man Tag Team Championship (2 times) – with Kodo Fuyuki and Shinjuku Shark (1), Kodo Fuyuki and Kintaro Kanemura (1)
- WEW Tag Team Championship (4 times) – with H (1), Mammoth Sasaki (2), and Tetsuhiro Kuroda (1)
- FMW World Street Fight 6-Man Tag Team Championship Tournament (1997) – with The Gladiator and Hisakatsu Oya
- Over the Top Tournament (1999)
- WEW Tag Team Championship Tournament (2001) – with Tetsuhiro Kuroda

- Guts World Pro-Wrestling

- GWC Single Championship (1 time)
- GWC 6-Man Tag Team Championship (1 time) — with Yuji Kito and Suzki

- International Wrestling Association of Japan

- IWA World Tag Team Championship (1 time) – with Tarzan Goto

- National Wrestling Alliance

- NWA World Tag Team Championship (1 time) – with Tarzan Goto
