= Mike Awesome =

American professional wrestler (1965–2007)

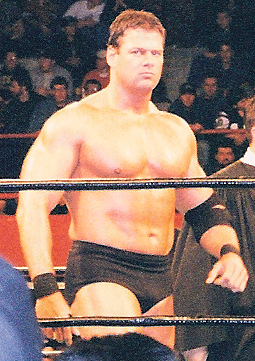
- Awesome in 1999

Personal information
- Born: Michael Lee Alfonso; January 24, 1965 Tampa, Florida, U.S.
- Died: February 17, 2007 (aged 42) Tampa, Florida, U.S.
- Cause of death: Suicide by hanging
- Spouse: Delisa Diann Bowers (m. 1991)
- Children: 2
- Family: Horace Hogan (cousin)

Professional wrestling career
- Ring name(s): Captain Awesome; The Gladiator; Mike Awesome; The Pro; Fat Chick Thriller; That '70s Guy
- Billed height: 6 ft 6 in (198 cm)
- Billed weight: 292 lb (132 kg)
- Trained by: Steve Keirn
- Debut: February 26, 1989
- Retired: February 26, 2006

Michael Lee Alfonso (January 24, 1965 – February 17, 2007) was an American professional wrestler. He was best known for his appearances with the American professional wrestling promotions Extreme Championship Wrestling (ECW), World Championship Wrestling (WCW) and the World Wrestling Federation/World Wrestling Entertainment (WWF/WWE) under the ring name Mike Awesome and for his appearances in Japan with Frontier Martial-Arts Wrestling and All Japan Pro Wrestling as The Gladiator.

Alfonso achieved the biggest success of his career in FMW as The Gladiator, where he became a three-time world champion, with two reigns as FMW Brass Knuckles Heavyweight Champion and one reign as FMW Independent Heavyweight Champion. His second Brass Knuckles Heavyweight Championship reign from 1996–1997 was the longest reign in the title's history, lasting for 489 days. During this reign, he defeated W*ING Kanemura to unify the title with the Independent Heavyweight Championship at the 1996 Year End Spectacular. He would then tour with ECW, where he became a two-time ECW World Heavyweight Champion. He was a member of two separate stables Team Canada in both FMW and WCW.

== Professional wrestling career ==
=== Early career (1989–1990) ===
Alfonso was trained to wrestle by Steve Keirn, debuting on February 26, 1989, at the Eddie Graham Sports Complex in Orlando, Florida. Alfonso trained for about one year alongside Dennis Knight and "Big" Al Green before making his debut. Alfonso debuted in the Professional Wrestling Federation in 1990. Alfonso then competed in the United States Wrestling Association, and World Championship Wrestling, before making his way to FMW in Japan.

=== Frontier Martial-Arts Wrestling ===
==== Initial years (1990–1992) ====
Alfonso moved on to Japan, joining Frontier Martial-Arts Wrestling (FMW) in September 1990 and using the name The Gladiator. He was recruited by FMW as the replacement for Al Green, who was originally scheduled to compete as Gladiator but moved to WCW. Alfonso debuted in FMW as a monster villain on September 20 in a street fight with Mr. Pogo against Atsushi Onita and Jimmy Backlund, which Alfonso's team won. Gladiator was Pogo's ally who feuded with Onita and competed with Pogo against Onita and his partners. He lost to Onita in a Chain Deathmatch on October 1, after which Alfonso returned to United States. Onita was impressed by Gladiator and called him back for more tours with FMW. He returned to the company as Mr. Pogo's partner in a tag team tournament on January 6, 1991, where the duo lost their first match in the tournament against Onita and Sambo Asako. Pogo and Gladiator made to the semi-final, where they beat Grigory Verichev and Boris Gogichashivili and then defeated Onita and Asako in the final on January 15 to win the tournament. The success of the tournament led Alfonso to work full-time with FMW.

In the summer of 1991, Gladiator would form a villainous alliance with Tarzan Goto, Big Titan and Horace Boulder after Mr. Pogo's departure from FMW and resumed the feud with Atsushi Onita. On August 17, Gladiator participated in the Barbed Wire Deathmatch Tournament, in which he defeated Horace Boulder in the quarter-final and lost to Sambo Asako in the semi-final. During this time, Gladiator was inspired by Damian's lucha libre videos on travels, which led him to adopt a high-flying style despite his big size. The following month, Gladiator and Big Titan defeated Sambo Asako and Ricky Fuji in a street fight stretcher match at the 2nd Anniversary Show. This partnership led the two to form a tag team which lasted nearly three years. In the fall of the year, Gladiator and Titan participated in the World's Strongest Tag Team Tournament to determine the inaugural WWA World Martial Arts Tag Team Champions, but were eliminated from the round robin stage with total six points. Gladiator and his allies would join The Sheik and Sabu to resume the feud with Onita and his allies throughout 1992. At 3rd Anniversary Show, Big Titan, The Gladiator and Horace Boulder defeated Sambo Asako, Ricky Fuji and The Great Punk in a street fight stretcher match. Later that year, Gladiator and Boulder participated in the Street Fight Tag Team Tournament, where they qualified for the semi-final against Tarzan Goto and Big Titan, which they lost.

==== Team Canada and W*ING Alliance (1993–1995) ====
In 1993, Gladiator formed the first villainous faction in FMW called Team Canada with Ricky Fuji, Big Titan, Horace Boulder, Dr. Luther and Dr. Hannibal after The Sheik and Sabu turned fan favorites and formed an alliance with Atsushi Onita. At 4th Anniversary Show, the team of Gladiator, Ricky Fuji and Big Titan defeated Katsuji Ueda, The Great Punk and Tarzan Goto in a Captain's Fall Losing Captain Leaves Town No Rope Barbed Wire Tornado Street Fight Deathmatch, which Team Canada won. The group strengthened its dominance after Mr. Pogo returned to FMW in the summer of 1993 and took over as the leader of the group. Gladiator and Titan were defeated by Sambo Asako and Mr. Gannosuke at Summer Spectacular. The team of Gladiator, Titan and Fuji gained more success by defeating Asako, Katsuji Ueda and Grigory Verichev in a street fight at Year End Spectacular.

The following year, Gladiator and Titan participated in a double-elimination tournament for the newly created Brass Knuckles Tag Team Championship, in which they defeated Hideki Hosaka and Hisakatsu Oya in the quarter-final, Jinsei Shinzaki and Masaru Toi in the semi-final and Mr. Gannosuke and Tarzan Goto in the final to succeed in their block and then defeated Atsushi Onita and Katsutoshi Niiyama in the tournament final on January 18, 1994, to win the Brass Knuckles Tag Team Championship, marking Alfonso's first title in FMW. They successfully defended the title against Atsushi Onita and Sambo Asako in a street fight on March 29 and then lost the title to Mr. Pogo and Hisakatsu Oya in their second title defense on April 21. The title loss created dissension between Titan and Gladiator. At 5th Anniversary Show, Gladiator, Titan and Fuji took on Fuyuki-Gun in a match, where Gladiator and Titan had a miscommunication with each other but still managed to win their match. However, Gladiator abandoned his partners after the match to quietly join Team Canada. As a result, Gladiator began feuding with Titan and defeated him in their first singles match against each other on July 31. Gladiator won a rematch at Summer Spectacular, before finally losing to Titan on September 7 to end the rivalry.

In October, Gladiator joined the new W*ING Alliance with Mr. Pogo, Mitsuhiro Matsunaga, Yukihiro Kanemura, Goro Tsurumi, Horace Boulder, Hideki Hosaka and Hisakatsu Oya. The group mostly consisted of wrestlers from the former W*ING promotion, who held Atsushi Onita and FMW responsible for ending the promotion and had formed the alliance to bring the demise of FMW just like W*ING suffered its demise. On October 28, Gladiator and Pogo defeated Atsushi Onita and Mr. Gannosuke to win the vacant Brass Knuckles Tag Team Championship. They lost the tag titles to Onita and Gannosuke in a rematch on February 24, 1995. At 6th Anniversary Show, Gladiator and Horace Boulder lost to Katsutoshi Niiyama and Masato Tanaka. Later at the event, Mr. Pogo turned on W*ING Alliance by blowing a fireball on Yukihiro Kanemura after Pogo and Kanemura lost their match, which led Gladiator, Boulder and Hisakatsu Oya to follow Pogo and join Lethal Weapon.

==== Longest reigning world champion (1995–1997) ====
The retirement of Atsushi Onita led FMW to change its direction from deathmatch wrestling to technical wrestling style and Gladiator received a strong push as the archrival of the company's new top star Hayabusa. He was booked to win the Grand Slam Tournament in September, in which he defeated Hayabusa in the tournament final on September 26 to win the company's top title, the vacant Brass Knuckles Heavyweight Championship and cemented his place as the company's top villain. Gladiator made his first successful title defense against Horace Boulder on October 25. He suffered a knee injury in the fall of 1995, which forced him to vacate the title on January 5, 1996. Gladiator returned from injury to challenge Super Leather for the title on March 15, but was defeated by Leather. During this time, Víctor Quiñones' group Puerto Rican Army overturned W*ING and Lethal Weapon to become the top villainous group in FMW and Quinones was luring away members of both factions into his Puerto Rican Army, which led Gladiator to turn fan favorite for the first time in his career. At 7th Anniversary Show, Hisakatsu Oya, Horace Boulder and The Gladiator lost to Super Leather and The Headhunters in a match for the inaugural World Street Fight 6-Man Tag Team Championship.

On May 27, Gladiator defeated Super Leather to win his second Brass Knuckles Heavyweight Championship. Gladiator successfully defended the title against Leather in a rematch on September 1. On September 15, Gladiator and Horace Boulder turned on Ricky Fuji during a match against Hideki Hosaka, Hido and Taka Michinoku. The entire Lethal Weapon attacked Fuji and turned on him to join Terry Funk's new group Funk Masters of Wrestling, which led Gladiator to turn into a villain again. On October 12, Gladiator attacked W*ING Kanemura after Kanemura successfully defended the Independent Heavyweight Championship against Hisakatsu Oya and Gladiator challenged Kanemura to a title unification match for both Brass Knuckles Heavyweight Championship and the Independent Heavyweight Championship at Year End Spectacular, which Gladiator won and unified both titles to become the first-ever FMW Double Champion. Gladiator successfully defended his Double Championship against Masato Tanaka on February 18, 1997. Gladiator would then resume his feud with the returning Atsushi Onita as the team of Gladiator, Terry Funk and Cactus Jack was defeated by Atsushi Onita, Masato Tanaka and W*ING Kanemura at 8th Anniversary Show on April 29. The following day, on April 30, Gladiator surpassed Atsushi Onita's fourth reign of 337 days to become the longest reigning Brass Knuckles Heavyweight Champion by having reigned for 338 days at that point.

On August 5, Hisakatsu Oya, Mr. Gannosuke and The Gladiator defeated Fuyuki-Gun at a Fuyuki Army show to win the World Street Fight 6-Man Tag Team Championship. They lost the title to the team of Hayabusa, Koji Nakagawa and Masato Tanaka on August 31. At Kawasaki Legend: Fall Spectacular, Gladiator lost the Double Championship to Masato Tanaka, thus ending his Brass Knuckles Heavyweight Championship reign at 489 days and his Independent Heavyweight Championship reign at 291 days, making him the longest reigning Brass Knuckles Heavyweight Champion and the longest reigning Independent Heavyweight Champion.

==== ZEN and departure (1997–1998) ====
Following Terry Funk's departure from FMW, Funk Masters (FMW) of Wrestling began to cripple as Atsushi Onita denounced himself as a FMW wrestler and formed ZEN on September 30, 1997, to feud with FMW. On October 21, Super Leather and The Gladiator lost a match to their former teammates Hisakatsu Oya and Mr. Gannosuke, after which Gladiator attacked Leather and officially ended Funk Masters of Wrestling. Later that night, Gladiator attacked Hayabusa after ZEN members defeated Hayabusa's team in the main event and then Gladiator raised the flag of ZEN and joined ZEN, which marked the first time in his career that he had become Atsushi Onita's ally after having feuded with him for the past seven years. Gladiator had lost his significance as a main event competitor after losing the Double Championship despite being the longest reigning champion and became a mid-card member of ZEN. The group turned fan favorites in the fall of 1997 when three of its members Mr. Gannosuke, Yukihiro Kanemura and Hido turned on Atsushi Onita and left the group and they would form Team No Respect in 1998.

In March, Gladiator participated in a tournament to determine the #1 contender for the Double Championship at 9th Anniversary Show. He defeated Hisakatsu Oya in the quarter-final and Yukihiro Kanemura in the semi-final to become the runner-up of the tournament as he lost to Hayabusa in the final. At FMW's first pay-per-view event FMW 9th Anniversary Show, Gladiator teamed with ZEN teammate Tetsuhiro Kuroda to take on TNR members Super Leather and Horace Boulder in a losing effort. Later at the event, Atsushi Onita lost a match to TNR member Kodo Fuyuki, which forced Onita to end ZEN. Gladiator became a free agent after ZEN's dissolution on May 5. Gladiator's last pay-per-view appearance in FMW was at the Welcome to the Darkside pay-per-view on August 22, where he defeated Naohiko Yamazaki, Yoshinori Sasaki and Mr. Pogo #2 in a gauntlet match. On August 26, Gladiator wrestled his last FMW match, in which he defeated longtime rival Super Leather. Alfonso injured his knee during the match and went on a hiatus, during which he returned to United States and toured with Extreme Championship Wrestling (ECW) for the rest of the year. He left the company due to disagreement over Kodo Fuyuki's style of booking.

=== All Japan Pro Wrestling (1998–1999) ===
Alfonso wrestled as The Gladiator for a brief period in All Japan Pro Wrestling in 1998 and 1999.

=== Eastern/Extreme Championship Wrestling (1993–1994, 1997, 1998, 1999–2000) ===
In 1993, Alfonso appeared in NWA Eastern Championship Wrestling (ECW) for a short period (as "Awesome" Mike Awesome), he was convinced to do so by Sabu, whom he befriended during their time in Japan. After Sabu started working for ECW, he returned to Japan and told Michael about the promotion and how he should work there. Although he was initially hesitant, citing a lack of interest, Sabu managed to talk Alfonso into it, who used his frequent-flier miles to go to Philadelphia and wrestle a match for ECW.

On February 5, 1994, at ECW's event, The Night the Line Was Crossed, Awesome nearly injured wrestler, J.T. Smith when he performed a high-risk dive to the outside of the ring. Smith's back was folded backwards against the guard rail during the impact. This spot appeared in many ECW highlight reels including the intro to a variety of their television programs for years to come (according to ECW announcer Joey Styles his own reaction to the spot inspired his "Oh my God" catchphrase).

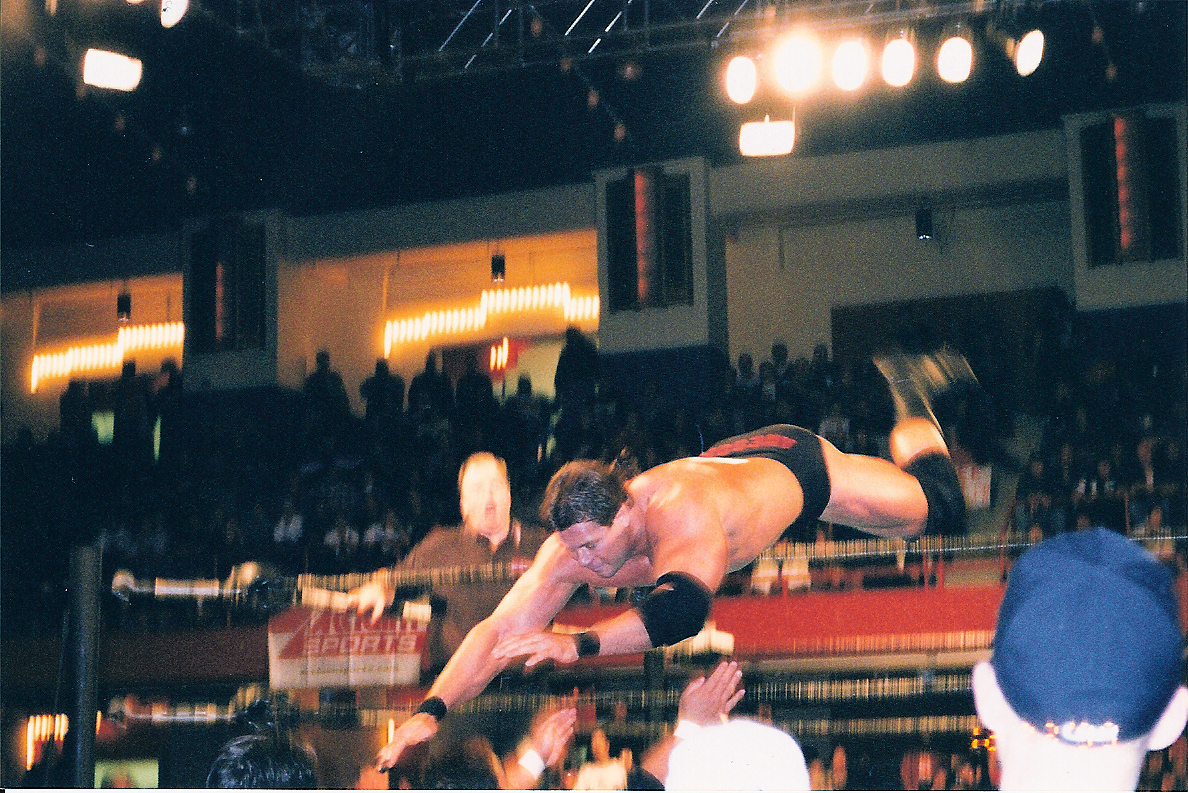
Alfonso performing a dive at an ECW show at Westchester County Center in White Plains, New York, 1999

Awesome returned to ECW in January 1997 at House Party, defeating Balls Mahoney. At Crossing the Line Again the following month, he lost to Louie Spicolli, departing ECW once more thereafter.

In July 1998, Awesome began appearing for ECW again and continued his feud with Masato Tanaka in the United States. Awesome began in ECW by losing to Tanaka on an episode ECW's weekly Hardcore TV. However, following the match, he delivered an Awesome Bomb to Tanaka over the top rope through a table set up on the outside. Awesome lost to Tanaka again at the August Heat Wave pay-per-view event. In September 1998 at UltraClash, Awesome tore his anterior cruciate ligament in a bout with Balls Mahoney; he did not wrestle again until September 1999.

Almost immediately upon arriving in ECW for his third stint in September 1999, he shocked the wrestling world by winning the ECW World Heavyweight Championship at Anarchy Rulz by defeating the reigning champion Taz and nemesis Masato Tanaka in a three-way dance, which was signed on the spot. Awesome continued to be a major factor in ECW early in 2000, including teaming with Raven to beat Tanaka and Tommy Dreamer for the ECW World Tag Team Championship. He gained a new manager, Judge Jeff Jones, who managed Awesome to the top of winning the ECW World Heavyweight Championship twice in 1999.

=== World Championship Wrestling (2000–2001) ===
==== The New Blood (2000) ====
On April 10, 2000, Awesome made a surprise appearance on WCW Monday Nitro—aiding The New Blood by attacking Kevin Nash—while still reigning as ECW World Heavyweight Champion. Awesome's friend Lance Storm has said that he had refused to sign a new contract with ECW until Paul Heyman paid him overdue wages. Due to concerns over legal issues, WCW refrained from having Awesome appear on their television shows with the ECW belt. Eventually, a compromise was reached. Awesome (a WCW employee and ECW champion) appeared a few days later at an ECW event in Indianapolis, Indiana, accompanied by WCW's head of security, where he lost the title to Tazz (a World Wrestling Federation employee), who lost it a week later to Tommy Dreamer (a full-time ECW wrestler) (who incidentally lost it approximately 20 minutes later to Justin Credible). In a shoot interview released by Highspots in 2005, Awesome expressed that he would have rather faced off with his former ECW and WWE colleague Rhyno and suggested that they could have put on a more entertaining match regardless of the circumstances and the manner in which he had left ECW.

Now with WCW, Awesome continued to be a major factor with the New Blood for the next month, teaming with Billy Kidman occasionally to aid him in his feud with Hulk Hogan. Awesome also engaged in an on-and-off feud with Kevin Nash, as well as feuding with Diamond Dallas Page and Kanyon. In May 2000, Awesome threw Kanyon off the top of the first level of a triple cage onto the entrance ramp, which started his "Career Killer" gimmick.

==== The Fat Chick Thriller / That '70s Guy (2000) ====
After Bash at the Beach in July 2000, his gimmick was tweaked, with him becoming infatuated with heavyset women and calling himself "The Fat Chick Thriller" and feuded with Scott Steiner and Lance Storm for the WCW United States Championship.

On the September 6, 2000, edition of Thunder, Awesome's gimmick was changed to "That '70s Guy" (a reference to the TV series That '70s Show), for which he dressed in 1970s-inspired attire and hosted the "Lava Lamp Lounge" interview segment. He was additionally given a bus that resembled the one featured on The Partridge Family to drive into arenas as part of his entrance. During this time, he had a feud with Vampiro, which resulted in brawls between Awesome and Vampiro's allies, the rap duo Insane Clown Posse (Violent J and Shaggy 2 Dope). Awesome battled both ICP members in a handicap match on an episode of Nitro, during which he hit Shaggy with a powerbomb on the roof of the bus that caused Shaggy to fall to the concrete floor below.

==== Team Canada (2001) ====
On the January 3, 2001, edition of Thunder, Awesome dropped the 1970s gimmick in favor of a "Canadian Career Killer" gimmick and joined WCW's Team Canada stable with Lance Storm and Elix Skipper. A feud with The Filthy Animals led to Awesome challenging Billy Kidman to a Hair-vs-Hair match, on January 15, however before the bout could take place, Team Canada attacked Kidman backstage, leaving him unable to compete. Kidman's bald stablemate Konnan replaced him and got the win, giving the Animals the right to cut off Awesome's longtime mullet. Awesome then faded into the background, mostly helping Storm in his battles against Ernest "The Cat" Miller. On the final Nitro on March 26, 2001, Awesome and Storm were defeated by Chuck Palumbo and Sean O'Haire in a WCW World Tag Team Championship match.

In an shoot interview released by Highspots in 2003, Awesome said that the infamous incident between Vince Russo and Hulk Hogan at Bash at the Beach 2000 may have been one of the underlying reasons as to why he was plagued by a string of unfavorable gimmicks. As a cousin of Michael Bollea (Horace Hogan, who also left WCW following the incident), Awesome suggested that Russo may have thought that he was just "too close of kin" to Hulk Hogan and decided to take it out on him.

=== World Wrestling Federation / World Wrestling Entertainment (1996, 2001–2002) ===
Awesome first made an appearance in WWF as a jobber on December 12, 1996, losing to Aldo Montoya in a dark match for WWF Superstars of Wrestling.

After the March 2001 purchase of WCW by the World Wrestling Federation (WWF, later renamed WWE), Awesome became part of The Invasion storyline in the WWF. His WWF debut came on the June 25, 2001, episode of Raw during a match which saw Test defending his WWF Hardcore Championship against Rhyno. After Rhyno Gored Test against a wall and pinned him, he stood celebrating his new title only to be attacked by Awesome wielding a metal pipe. He then powerbombed Rhyno onto a ladder and pinned him, becoming champion himself due to the 24/7 rule. Awesome was the first "Invader" to gain gold in the WWF, stealing away with the Hardcore belt before any WWF wrestlers could catch him. Awesome's hardcore reign came to an end a few weeks later on the July 12 edition of SmackDown! when he was pinned by Jeff Hardy, thanks to distraction from Edge. Awesome defeated Edge on the July 16 episode of Raw.

The feud continued when Edge introduced his tag team partner Christian into the rivalry. Awesome and Lance Storm were defeated by Edge and Christian at Invasion on July 22, Awesome's first WWF pay-per-view match. From here Awesome's push diminished and he began appearing mostly on WWF's b-shows, before being sidelined with an injury in November 2001.

Awesome returned to the SmackDown! brand on the July 27, 2002, edition of Velocity where he was defeated by Tajiri. Awesome was a mainstay on Velocity, SmackDown!'s tertiary show, for the next few months jobbing to wrestlers such as Faarooq, Bull Buchanan, Mark Henry and Funaki.

Awesome was released from the WWE on September 27, 2002, along with Shawn Stasiak and Horace Hogan. Awesome was quoted saying, "Being in the WWE (formerly the WWF) sucked. I hated it. You had to kiss everybody's ass... You had to be on your political toes all the time. You would not believe the backstage politics. You were getting stabbed in the back constantly. I was so happy when I was told I was gone".

=== Later career (2002–2006) ===
From 2002 to 2006, Awesome competed on the independent circuit in the United States and Japan where he returned to All Japan Pro Wrestling (AJPW) as "The Gladiator" once again. On the independent circuit, he had a short stint with Major League Wrestling (MLW) where he won the MLW World Heavyweight Championship from Satoshi Kojima, only to lose it ten minutes later to Steve Corino (Kojima's employers, AJPW, would not allow him to drop the title to an employee of a rival company Zero-1).

He worked for Pro Wrestling Noah from 2004 to 2005.

In February 2006, after 17 years in the ring, Awesome announced his retirement from wrestling, saying he wanted to spend more time with his family and adding that he felt underpaid for his work at the One Night Stand event and that he would only return to the ring "if the money was right".

=== Total Nonstop Action Wrestling (2003) ===
In April 2003, Awesome debuted in Total Nonstop Action Wrestling (TNA). He wrestled several matches for the promotion before leaving in May 2003. His TNA in-ring debut was on April 16, 2003, where Awesome defeated Perry Saturn by DQ when The Sandman and New Jack interfered. On April 23, Awesome teamed with Brian Lee and Slash in a losing effort against Perry Saturn, New Jack and The Sandman. On May 14, Awesome competed in his final TNA match where he lost to Mike Sanders in a Tables Match.

=== Return to WWE (2005) ===
Awesome made an appearance at WWE's (formerly the WWF) ECW One Night Stand reunion pay-per-view on June 12, 2005, defeating Masato Tanaka. The crowd greeted Awesome with jeers at the beginning of the match, and commentator Joey Styles made frequent references to Awesome's leaving of ECW for WCW and during the match, after Awesome performed a suicide dive, Styles infamously said, "And it's a shame he didn't succeed in taking his own life", but by the end the crowd were chanting "This match rules!" and gave both men a standing ovation.

== Other media ==
Alfonso appeared in at least four wrestling video games including ECW Hardcore Revolution, WCW Backstage Assault, Virtual Pro Wrestling 2: Ōdō Keishō, and Fire Pro Wrestling Returns. The ECW toy series manufactured by Original San Francisco Toymakers released a Mike Awesome action figure in 2000. A WCW action figure of Awesome was released by Toy Biz in 2001.

== Personal life ==
Alfonso attended King High School in Tampa, Florida, and trained at Stan's Gym, an old school muscle gym, on 56th Street. On May 11, 1991, he married his high school sweetheart Delisa Diann Bowers in Hillsborough, Florida. They had two children together; son Casey (born 1996) and daughter Carissa (born 2000). Alfonso was an avid outdoorsman and enjoyed fishing and trail bike riding with friends and his son. He enjoyed mountain biking and would ride frequently at Alafia River State Park in Florida, close to his Tampa home.

Alfonso was the cousin of Hulk Hogan's nephew Michael Bollea, who was better known for his stint in WCW under the name Horace Hogan.

After Awesome's retirement from professional wrestling, he worked as a real estate agent in New Tampa, Florida.

== Death ==
On February 17, 2007, a group of Alfonso's friends found him dead after he had hanged himself inside his Tampa home. He was later paid tribute on the February 20 broadcast of ECW on Sci-Fi with an "In Memory..." graphic at the opening of the program.

== Championships and accomplishments ==
- Extreme Championship Wrestling
  - ECW World Heavyweight Championship (2 times)
  - ECW World Tag Team Championship (1 time) – with Raven
- Frontier Martial-Arts Wrestling
  - FMW Independent World Heavyweight Championship (1 time)
  - FMW World Brass Knuckles Championship (2 times)
  - FMW World Brass Knuckles Tag Team Championship (2 times) – with Big Titan (1), and Mr. Pogo (1)
  - FMW World Street Fight 6-Man Tag Team Championship (1 time) – with Mr. Gannosuke and Hisakatsu Oya
  - FMW Tag Team Tournament (1991) – with Mr. Pogo
  - FMW Brass Knuckles Tag Team Championship Tournament (1994) – with Big Titan
  - Grand Slam Tournament (1995)
  - FMW World Street Fight 6-Man Tag Team Championship Tournament (1997) – with Hisakatsu Oya and Mr. Gannosuke
- Major League Wrestling
  - MLW World Heavyweight Championship (1 time)
- Pro Wrestling Illustrated
  - Ranked No. 7 of the top 500 singles wrestlers in the PWI 500 in 2000
- World Championship Wrestling
  - Countdown To Armageddon Battle Royal (2000)
- World Wrestling Federation
  - WWF Hardcore Championship (1 time)
- Wrestling Observer Newsletter
  - Worst Gimmick (2000)

== See also ==
- List of premature professional wrestling deaths
