= Hayabusa (wrestler) =

Japanese professional wrestler and promoter, stage actor and musician (1968–2016)

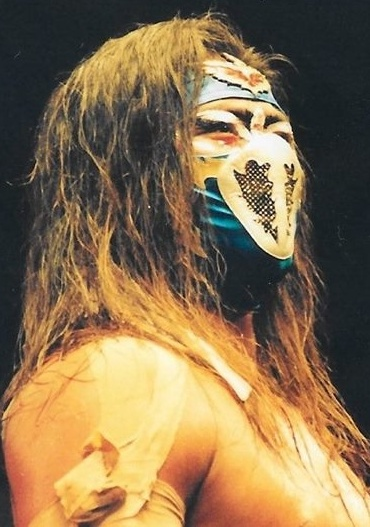
- Ezaki as Hayabusa at an FMW show in April 1999
- Born: Eiji Ezaki; November 29, 1968; Yatsushiro, Kumamoto, Japan
- Died: March 3, 2016 (aged 47); Kamata, Tokyo, Japan
- Occupations: Professional wrestler, musician, stage actor
- Years active: 1987–2001 (professional wrestler); 2001–2016 (musician); 2000–2005 (actor)
- Spouse: Harumi Ezaki (m. 1997; div. 2004)
- Children: 2
- Professional wrestling career
- Ring name(s): Darkside Hayabusa; Darkside of Hayabusa; Eiji Ezaki; H Hayabusa
- Billed height: 1.83 m (6 ft 0 in)
- Billed weight: 102 kg (225 lb)
- Trained by: Takashi Ishikawa; Tarzan Goto; Rey Misterio Sr. FMW Dojo
- Debut: November 2, 1987 (Note: The exact date of Hayabusa's professional wrestling debut is disputed. FMW's website has officially listed Hayabusa's debut as November 2, 1987, although most of the sources have recorded his debut as May 5, 1991.)
- Retired: October 22, 2001

Eiji Ezaki (江崎 英治, Ezaki Eiji; November 29, 1968 – March 3, 2016), better known as Hayabusa (ハヤブサ, Hayabusa; "Falcon"), was a Japanese professional wrestler and promoter, stage actor, and musician. He was best known for his time with Frontier Martial-Arts Wrestling (FMW), where he primarily wrestled throughout his career and was the ace of the company between 1995 and 2001.

Ezaki initially competed for FMW as a low-carder between 1991 and 1993 before travelling to Mexico where he developed the "Hayabusa" character and his signature wrestling style during his time with lucha libre organizations. He returned to Japan in 1994 at the inaugural Super J-Cup tournament, and received a significant push in FMW as the face of the company; he won his first Brass Knuckles Heavyweight Championship later that year. He spent much of 1996 on the sidelines due to injury and lost the majority of his high-profile matches upon his return. He started gaining popularity and championship success in 1997 and won the Double Championship in 1998 and held the title for most of the year. He developed alter egos such as "The Darkside of Hayabusa" in 1996 and the unmasked "H" in 1999. His career ended in late 2001 after a botched moonsault left him paralysed during a match with Mammoth Sasaki.

He was a five-time world champion in FMW as he won the Brass Knuckles Heavyweight Championship three times, Independent Heavyweight Championship one time and the WEW Heavyweight Championship one time. He also became a two time Brass Knuckles Tag Team Champion, a two time WEW World Tag Team Champion, a two time World Street Fight 6-Man Tag Team Champion and a two time WEW 6-Man Tag Team Champion. He also won All Japan Pro Wrestling's All Asia Tag Team Championship once.

He headlined many pay-per-view events for FMW including the company's premier show Anniversary Show a record six times, consecutively for four years between the 9th and 12th editions of the event. In his post-retirement years, Ezaki promoted the Wrestlings Marvelous Future (WMF) promotion, which spun off from FMW, but the promotion was a failure and closed in 2008.

== Professional wrestling career ==
=== Early career (1987–1991) ===
Trained by former All Japan Pro Wrestling (AJPW) star and sumo wrestler Takashi Ishikawa, Eiji Ezaki made his wrestling debut while in college on a student wrestling event on November 2, 1987, teaming with Masashi Honda against three upper classmen. He and Honda would continue to perform on student wrestling events and for small independent promotions before joining Frontier Martial Arts Wrestling (FMW)'s dojo, headed by another former AJPW alumnus Tarzan Goto.

=== Frontier Martial-Arts Wrestling (1991–2001) ===
==== Early years (1991–1993) ====
After graduating from the FMW dojo, Ezaki made his FMW debut on May 5, 1991, where he teamed up with Amigo Ultra to defeat El Pandita and Yukihide Ueno in a tag team match. As is customary for rookies to lose matches in professional wrestling, especially puroresu, Ezaki lost the majority of his matches throughout the year. Ezaki got his first win in FMW against fellow rookie (and his former college compatriot) Masashi Honda on June 29. The two competed in many matches including the opening match of FMW's 2nd Anniversary Show on September 23, which Ezaki won. His next major show appearance was at a FMW and World Wrestling Association co-promoted interpromotional event on May 16, 1992, where Ezaki represented FMW with Mr. Gannosuke and Ultra Taro against WWA's Los Mercenarios Americanos (Mercenario I, Mercenario II and Mercenario III) in a six-man tag team match, which Ezaki lost after being pinned by Spicolli. At September's 3rd Anniversary Show, Ezaki and Gannosuke lost to Chris Jericho and Kevin Faule. Ezaki participated in the company's 4th Anniversary Show on May 5, 1993, where he defeated Koji Nakagawa in the opening match. In September 1993, Ezaki participated in a tournament for the inaugural Independent World Junior Heavyweight Championship, where he lost both matches in his block against Koji Nakagawa and Battle Ranger Z. His last match in FMW during this tenure was a win against Masato Tanaka on September 27, before Atsushi Onita sent Ezaki overseas to learn the lucha libre style in Mexico.

==== North American excursion (1993–1995) ====
Ezaki adopted the Hayabusa character in December 1993 while in Mexico. While there, he learned the lucha libre style from wrestling instructor Rey Misterio, Sr. Ezaki wrestled for the World Wrestling Association, Consejo Mundial de Lucha Libre (CMLL) during his time in Mexico. He then returned to Japan to participate in the 1994 Super J-Cup tournament for New Japan Pro-Wrestling (NJPW), where he competed as Hayabusa in Japan for the first time to test how the crowd reacted to his character in Japan. He faced Jushin Liger in a losing effort in a well received first round match of the tournament. The following month, Hayabusa debuted for CMLL on May 17 by teaming with Ringo Mendoza and La Sombra to defeat Javier Cruz, Panico and Tornado Negro in a two out of three falls match. He teamed with Super Astro in the number one contender's tournament for the vacated World Tag Team Championship, where the duo lost to El Dandy and Negro Casas in the opening round. During his time in Mexico, Víctor Quiñones would offer Ezaki a contract to defect to IWA Japan, but declined, showing loyalty to FMW. He appeared as Hayabusa in FMW for the first time at Summer Spectacular on August 28, 1994, by defeating Sabu. He then returned to CMLL to team with fellow Japanese wrestler Último Dragón in the 1994 Copa de Oro on October 25 in a loss to eventual winners Apolo Dantés and El Dandy in the quarter-final. The following month, Hayabusa and Dragon participated in the number two contender's tournament for the World Tag Team Championship, where they defeated El Felino and Mano Negra in the first round before losing to El Satánico and Emilio Charles Jr. in the quarter-final. He would remain in Mexico until December 1994.

Between January 1995 and April 1995, Ezaki wrestled in the United States, mainly in the Florida area. During this time, the World Wrestling Federation (WWF) was interested in Ezaki and offered a tryout, but he declined and remained with FMW.

==== Initial push and injuries (1995–1996) ====
Ezaki was scheduled to make his full-time return to FMW as Hayabusa at the company's 6th Anniversary Show against The Gladiator on May 5, 1995. However, he was chosen by FMW's new owner Shoichi Arai to fill the spot as Atsushi Onita's opponent in Onita's retirement match at the event as Onita wanted his final opponent to succeed him as the promotion's ace after Onita's originally supposed opponent Tarzan Goto left FMW and there was no main event star left to be Onita's opponent. Hayabusa returned to FMW at the 6th Anniversary Show, where he unsuccessfully challenged Onita for the Brass Knuckles Heavyweight Championship in an exploding cage barbed wire deathmatch. During the match, Ezaki managed to kick out of Onita's Thunder Fire Powerbomb and gave a huge fight. He was rushed to the hospital on a stretcher due to severe burns but became Onita's successor as the ace of FMW. Hayabusa returned to the company on May 17 by teaming with Katsutoshi Niiyama against Lethal Weapon members The Gladiator and Horace Boulder in a losing effort to begin his first rivalry in the company with Lethal Weapon. He was the leader of the new generation of FMW wrestlers including Niiyama, Masato Tanaka and Tetsuhiro Kuroda and Koji Nakagawa. He wrestled the group's members in several tag matches for the next one month after Lethal Weapon questioned his ability to become the ace of FMW and vowed to take over the company. He initially struggled to gain a fanbase after Onita's loyal fans refused to accept him but Hayabusa got to impress the Japanese fans by debuting the Phoenix Splash against Lethal Weapon member Ricky Fuji during a match on May 28. Hayabusa's team lost but the Phoenix Splash was heavily promoted by the Japanese media, which helped FMW in regaining the fanbase and Ezaki started becoming popular due to his high-flying skills.

Just one month after his re-debut, Ezaki was booked to win the promotion's top title, the vacant Brass Knuckles Heavyweight Championship by defeating Lethal Weapon member Hisakatsu Oya on June 27 by debuting his new finishing move, Falcon Arrow. However, he immediately vacated the title due to injury but a storyline was created that he vacated it because he wanted to beat Gladiator and all the members of the W*ING Alliance. The title was put up for grabs in the Grand Slam Tournament, an eight-man tournament in the round-robin format and Ezaki was put in the tournament. However, before the tournament started, Ezaki was severely injured by The Gladiator in a match on July 30 but he insisted that he would compete in the tournament. Ezaki started the tournament on August 22 by defeating Masato Tanaka. He won his next match against W*ING Kanemura on August 25 to gain four points. He competed against Hisakatsu Oya to a thirty-minute time limit draw and defeated The Gladiator and Katsutoshi Niiyama to gain nine points in the tournament. He suffered his first loss in the tournament against Super Leather and then defeated Mitsuhiro Matsunaga to qualify for the final. He lost to Gladiator in the final round of the Grand Slam on September 25. Ezaki competed against W*ING and Lethal Weapon members in various tag team matches, street fights and deathmatches throughout the rest of the year and early 1996 before taking time off due to multiple injuries.

Despite the injury, Hayabusa returned to FMW on March 30 to rescue Jason the Terrible from an assault by Mr. Pogo and The Headhunters to set up the main event for the company's 7th Anniversary Show on May 5, where he teamed with Masato Tanaka to take on Pogo and Terry Funk in a no rope explosive barbed wire time bomb land mine double hell death match and the winner would receive one million yens. Hayabusa was pinned by Funk after a brutal match. After the one-off return, Ezaki continued to heal his injuries and did not compete in FMW for the next three months. On August 1, he made his return to full-time competition by defeating Koji Nagakawa at the Summer Spectacular event. On September 11, Ezaki debuted an alter ego called Darkside Hayabusa during a street fight against Hido at a W*ING show, which Ezaki won. On September 20, Jinsei Shinzaki of Michinoku Pro Wrestling challenged Hayabusa to a match, who Hayabusa lost to in the main event of Michinoku Pro Wrestling's These Days event. This marked the beginning of a future friendship between the two. Following the match, The Great Sasuke challenged Hayabusa to a match at FMW's Year End Spectacular on December 11, which Ezaki won.

==== The Ace of FMW (1997–1998) ====
In the meanwhile, Terry Funk formed the Funk Masters of Wrestling group, which replaced Lethal Weapon as the new antagonist group and Hayabusa wrestled the group's members throughout the rest of 1996 and much of 1997. Ezaki's former friend Mr. Gannosuke returned to FMW and attacked Hayabusa after Hayabusa and Katsutoshi Niiyama lost to The Headhunters in a tag team match on January 5, 1997. As a result of the attack, Hayabusa began a lengthy and emotional rivalry with Gannosuke that would continue for the rest of his career. During this time, Ricky Fuji sided with FMW after the demise of Lethal Weapon and became an ally of Hayabusa. On March 19, Hayabusa got his first title shot in nearly two years as he and Fuji challenged The Headhunters for the Brass Knuckles Tag Team Championship in a losing effort. The following month, Ezaki served as the centerpiece of FMW during a meeting with All Japan Pro Wrestling owner Giant Baba to begin a partnership between AJPW and FMW and subsequently made his AJPW debut at the 1997 Champion Carnival by teaming with Yoshinobu Kanemaru against Kentaro Shiga and Yoshinari Ogawa in a losing effort. This paved the way for wrestlers of AJPW and FMW to sporadically appear in both companies and began Hayabusa's occasional appearances in AJPW. Hayabusa defeated Gannosuke in a hair vs. hair match at FMW's 8th Anniversary Show. After the match, Hayabusa said that Gannosuke's hair would not be cut off if he left Funk Masters of Wrestling and side with FMW and Gannosuke apparently shook his hands and then attacked Hayabusa, thus removed his mask and attempted to blow fire on him until Jinsei Shinzaki made the save.

As a result, Hayabusa formed a tag team with Shinzaki. They teamed with each other for the first time by teaming with Koji Nakagawa against Funk Masters of Wrestling members Hisakatsu Oya, Mr. Gannosuke and The Gladiator in a six-man tag team match on July 19. On August 5, Hayabusa teamed with Nakagawa and Ricky Fuji in a tournament for the vacant World Street Fight 6-Man Tag Team Championship. They lost to eventual winners Oya, Gannosuke and Gladiator in the semi-final round. On August 31, the trio of Hayabusa, Nakagawa and Masato Tanaka defeated Oya, Gannosuke and Gladiator to win the World Street Fight 6-Man Tag Team Championship. On September 28, Hayabusa wrestled two matches on the same day. He first appeared in a tag team match for AJPW at Korakuen Hall in Tokyo by teaming with Mitsuharu Misawa to defeat Jun Akiyama and Saturo Asako. He then travelled to Kawasaki, Kanagawa to compete at FMW's Fall Spectacular at the Kawasaki Stadium, where he and Shinzaki lost to AJPW's Kenta Kobashi and Maunakea Mossman in a highly acclaimed tag team match. On October 14, Hayabusa, Nakagawa and Tanaka dropped the six-man tag team title to ZEN members Atsushi Onita, Hido and Tetsuhiro Kuroda. This marked the beginning of a feud between Hayabusa and Onita as Onita wanted to stay on the top of FMW while Ezaki wanted to remain the ace of the company.

Hayabusa and Shinzaki participated in AJPW's 1997 Real World Tag League and kicked off the tournament on November 19 by defeating Giant Kimala and Jun Izumida. They finished the tournament with four points as they would win only one more match against Johnny Smith and Wolf Hawkfield, while losing the rest of their matches. Hayabusa and Masato Tanaka faced Mr. Gannosuke and Yukihiro Kanemura in a losing effort for the vacant Brass Knuckles Tag Team Championship on November 28. Hayabusa and Jinsei Shinzaki unsuccessfully challenged Gannosuke and Kanemura for the tag team title on December 19. On December 20, Hayabusa, Hisakatsu Oya and Masato Tanaka won the World Street Fight Six-Man Tag Team Championship by beating Atsushi Onita, Hido and Tetsuhiro Kuroda during the Super Extreme Wrestling War tour. On December 22, Hayabusa, Jinsei Shinzaki and Masato Tanaka defeated ZEN members Atsushi Onita, Mr. Gannosuke and Yukihiro Kanemura in a WarGames match after Hayabusa pinned Onita after a Moonsault from the top of the cage as a payback for his loss to Onita at 6th Anniversary Show in 1995. Hayabusa started getting over with the audience and he was finally being heavily pushed. Friction arose within ZEN and Gannosuke formed his own group Team No Respect. On January 16, 1998, Hayabusa, Masato Tanaka and Hisakatsu Oya lost their six-man tag team title to Team No Respect members Gannosuke, Yukihiro Kanemura and Jado. Hayabusa and his allies battled Team No Respect members for the next three months and Hayabusa lost a singles match to TNR member Kodo Fuyuki in the first singles encounter between the two on February 19 to begin a long lasting rivalry with Fuyuki.

The following month, Hayabusa won a tournament by defeating Masato Tanaka, Jado and The Gladiator to become the #1 contender for his rival Mr. Gannosuke's FMW Double Championship, the unified Brass Knuckles Heavyweight Championship and the Independent Heavyweight Championship. On April 17, Hayabusa and Masato Tanaka defeated Hido and Kodo Fuyuki to win the Brass Knuckles Tag Team Championship. On April 30, Hayabusa defeated Mr. Gannosuke to win the Double Titles Championship at FMW's first pay-per-view 9th Anniversary Show: Entertainment Wrestling Live. Immediately after the title win, Hayabusa appeared at AJPW's twenty-fifth anniversary show Showdown at the Egg, where he teamed with AJPW owner Giant Baba and Kentaro Shiga against Jinsei Shinzaki, Jun Izumida and Giant Kimala. Hayabusa got the win for his team by pinning Izumida. Hayabusa made his first title defense of the Double Championship against his tag team championship partner Masato Tanaka on May 19, where Hayabusa retained the title. The match between the two earned critical acclaim and is highly regarded as the best match of Ezaki's career. On May 27, Hayabusa and Tanaka lost the Brass Knuckles Tag Team Championship to Kodo Fuyuki and Yukihiro Kanemura.

Shortly after, Tanaka left FMW and Ezaki made Daisuke Ikeda his new tag team partner. During this time, Gannosuke was injured and Kodo Fuyuki became the new leader of Team No Respect. Hayabusa and his allies split wins with Team No Respect at the June and July pay-per-views. On August 2, Hayabusa made an appearance for Extreme Championship Wrestling (ECW) at the Heat Wave pay-per-view where he and Jinsei Shinzaki unsuccessfully challenged Rob Van Dam and Sabu for the ECW World Tag Team Championship. Hayabusa returned to FMW to begin a feud with Koji Nakagawa after Nakagawa pinned him to win an elimination tag team match. As a result, Hayabusa faced him as "Darkside Hayabusa" in a losing effort at the Welcome to the Darkside pay-per-view. On September 1, Hayabusa successfully defended the Double Championship in his third defense against Hisakatsu Oya after the duo wrestled to a thirty-minute time limit draw. He made his next title defense against Jado on September 20, where he retained and then teamed with Ricky Fuji to take on Kodo Fuyuki, Koji Nakagawa and Gedo in an immediate handicap match, which he lost and this earned Nakagawa and Fuyuki title shots at the Double Championship.

Ezaki successfully defended the title against Nakagawa at the October pay-per-view. On October 26, Hayabusa and Ikeda defeated Kodo Fuyuki and Yukihiro Kanemura to capture the Brass Knuckles Tag Team Championship. They made only one title defense against Hideki Hosaka and Tetsuhiro Kuroda on November 14. On November 20, Hayabusa lost the Double Championship to Fuyuki in his sixth title defense. Hayabusa participated in an Over the Top tournament to earn a title shot at the Double Championship by defeating Gedo in the first round, before losing to Hisakatsu Oya in the quarter-final round at the ECW/FMW Supershow II.

==== Character change (1999–2000) ====
In early 1999, Hayabusa and Daisuke Ikeda vacated the Brass Knuckles Tag Team Championship after Ikeda suffered an injury. On January 16, 1999, Hayabusa reunited with Jinsei Shinzaki at an AJPW show to challenge Tamon Honda and Jun Izumida for the All Asia Tag Team Championship in a losing effort. Hayabusa and Shinzaki were granted a rematch on February 13, in which they defeated Honda and Izumida to capture the All Asia Tag Team Championship. Hayabusa and Shinzaki made their first and only successful title defense against Masato Tanaka and Tetsuhiro Kuroda on March 19. Hayabusa renewed his rivalry with Mr. Gannosuke and formed an alliance with rival Double Champion Kodo Fuyuki. Hayabusa and Fuyuki entered a round robin tournament for the vacant Brass Knuckles Tag Team Championship, where they qualified for the finals by topping the tournament with thirteen points by winning all of their matches except fighting Masato Tanaka and Tetsuhiro Kuroda to a thirty-minute time limit draw on March 29. On May 3, Hayabusa and Fuyuki lost to Tanaka and Kuroda in the final round. After the match, Hayabusa poured water on Fuyuki to revive him which angered Fuyuki and the two came to blows and this ended the partnership between the two. On May 5, Hayabusa and Shinzaki took on Tanaka and Kuroda in a tag team match where the winner of the fall would earn a Double Championship match against Kodo Fuyuki in the main event and Kuroda pinned Hayabusa to earn the title shot. Fuyuki took over as the new commissioner of FMW and an alliance was formed between Gannosuke's Outlaws and Team No Respect. On May 31, Hayabusa, Masato Tanaka, Tetsuhiro Kuroda, Hideki Hosaka and Hisakatsu Oya faced Kodo Fuyuki, Mr. Gannosuke, Hido, Koji Nakagawa and Yukihiro Kanemura in a five-on-five elimination tag team match which Hayabusa's FMW team won with a clean sweep as his entire team survived. On June 4, Hayabusa and Shinzaki lost the All Asia Tag Team Championship to No Fear (Takao Omori and Yoshihiro Takayama).

Ezaki had suffered multiple injuries during the past few years of his career which forced him to change his wrestling style from high flying to mat wrestling. This was incorporated into a storyline that Kodo Fuyuki would not allow Ezaki to wear the falcon mask and compete as Hayabusa anymore. This led Ezaki to go through a character change. On June 15, Hayabusa teamed with Masato Tanaka and Tetsuhiro Kuroda to defeat Mr. Gannosuke, Yukihiro Kanemura and Hido in a ladder match which stipulated that Fuyuki had to eat dog food if his team lost. FMW held a series of events titled Goodbye Hayabusa as a farewell to Ezaki's Hayabusa character. During this time, he participated in a tournament with Tanaka and Kuroda for the newly created WEW 6-Man Tag Team Championship. Hayabusa and his team reached the finals of the tournament on July 31, where they lost to Kodo Fuyuki, Gedo and Koji Nakagawa. At Hayabusa Graduation Ceremony, Hayabusa defeated Yukihiro Kanemura to win his third Brass Knuckles Heavyweight Championship and made his first and only title defense against Mr. Gannosuke on August 25 in his last match as Hayabusa, which he won to retain the title. The title was immediately retired.

On August 27, Ezaki debuted his new character H, with a complete makeover of colored hair, a tattooed chest and jeans. Ezaki won his first match as H, an elimination match against Team No Respect. Gannosuke was injured in the match and then he attacked H under the Hayabusa costume and attire on September 3, thus instigating a feud between H and Hayabusa. This led to an anus exploding match between the two on October 29, which ended in a no contest. At the 10th Anniversary Show, H defeated fake Hayabusa in the main event, with Shawn Michaels as the special guest referee. H and Gannosuke reconciled after the match by shaking hands with each other to end their rivalry and form a tag team. On December 1, H and Gannosuke defeated Tetsuhiro Kuroda and Hisakatsu Oya to win the WEW Tag Team Championship. H and Gannosuke lost the title to Kodo Fuyuki and Kyoko Inoue on February 25, 2000. H defeated Inoue in singles action on March 27.

On April 3, H represented FMW against the new ECW Japan leader Kodo Fuyuki in a losing effort. H began feuding with Masato Tanaka due to Tanaka confronting him on forgiving Mr. Gannosuke. Ezaki and Gannosuke lost to Tanaka and Balls Mahoney in a tag team match on April 11, during which Ezaki went backstage as H and then competed as Hayabusa for the first time in several months. Ezaki's H character had failed to garner crowd support and ticket sales were dwindling, which caused Ezaki to slowly transition back to compete as Hayabusa. At Backdraft, he competed as Hayabusa in a win over Tanaka. On May 28, H competed against Gannosuke and Tetsuhiro Kuroda in a three-way dance to determine the #1 contender for the WEW Heavyweight Championship with the champion Kodo Fuyuki as the special guest referee. H eliminated Kuroda and then Gannosuke turned on H by hitting with a crutch and pinned him with Fuyuki's help and became a member of Shin Fuyuki-Gun. On June 16, Ezaki unleashed Darkside of H and brought "Hayabusa" as his tag team partner for a match against Goemon and Kodo Fuyuki. H and Hayabusa won the match to take revenge from Shin-Fuyuki-Gun for attacking and kidnapping Ricky Fuji. On June 26, H won the WEW 6-Man Tag Team Championship with Hisakatsu Oya and Tetsuhiro Kuroda by defeating Kodo Fuyuki, Kyoko Inoue and Chocoball Mukai. On July 22, Ezaki retired his H character and announced that he would begin competing as Hayabusa again after he and Tetsuhiro Kuroda defeated The Samoans (Eddie Fatu and Matty Samu).

==== WEW Heavyweight Champion and career-ending injury (2000–2001) ====
On July 23, Ezaki revived his Hayabusa character after a year and defeated Shin Fuyuki-Gun members in a gauntlet match to earn an immediate WEW Heavyweight Championship match against Kodo Fuyuki, which he lost after Jinsei Shinzaki turned on Hayabusa. On July 28, Hayabusa, Masato Tanaka and Hisakatsu Oya defeated Fuyuki, Shinzaki and Mr. Gannosuke after Hayabusa pinned Gannosuke. This set up a match against Gannosuke on August 28, which Hayabusa won to earn a shot at Fuyuki's WEW Heavyweight Championship. On September 15, Hayabusa, Hisakatsu Oya and Tetsuhiro Kuroda lost the WEW 6-Man Tag Team Championship to Fuyuki, Gannosuke and Shinjuku Shark. On September 21, Hayabusa defeated Fuyuki in a non-title 15,000 volt thunderbolt cage death match. On September 26, Hayabusa took on Fuyuki for the WEW Heavyweight Championship in a sixty-minute Iron Man match, which ended in a draw. Hayabusa called it the hardest match of his career. After the match, Hayabusa demanded another title shot, which Fuyuki agreed. On October 29, Hayabusa and Onryo defeated Goemon and Fuyuki in a tag team match. On November 12, Hayabusa got another title shot against Fuyuki at the Deep Throat pay-per-view, but lost the match. Hayabusa and Fuyuki ended the feud after the match by shaking hands with each other and then Tetsuhiro Kuroda turned on Hayabusa by attacking him. Hayabusa then took time off to heal his injured arms.

Hayabusa had a successful double elbow surgery on November 22. He returned to FMW at a pay-per-view on December 20 as a color commentator, along with Mr. Gannosuke, who had retired from wrestling after losing to Tetsuhiro Kuroda. During the match, Kuroda mocked Hayabusa to anger him and Hayabusa headed to the ring but Gannosuke held him back. On February 6, 2001, Hayabusa made another non-wrestling appearance to confront Kuroda along with The Masked Sumo. Sumo turned on Gannosuke and Kuroda injured Hayabusa's arms with a folding chair until The Great Sasuke made the save. On April 1, Hayabusa appeared during Kuroda and Kodo Fuyuki's WEW Heavyweight Championship match, where he attacked Mr. Gannosuke after Gannosuke attacked Fuyuki during the match and then Kuroda and his allies attacked Hayabusa until Sasuke came to his rescue again. Hayabusa made his in-ring return at the 12th Anniversary Show on May 5 by teaming with Sasuke to defeat Kuroda and Gannosuke in an octagon cage electric bomb death match. This match also commemorated the tenth anniversary of his FMW debut. On May 11, Hayabusa pinned Kuroda in a six-man tag team match to earn a title shot at Kuroda. On May 22, Hayabusa defeated Kuroda in a double hell barbed wire deathmatch to win the WEW Heavyweight Championship, with Kodo Fuyuki as the special guest referee.

On June 8, Fuyuki bought FMW from Shoichi Arai in storyline and gave the wrestlers option to either side with Arai or Fuyuki. Hayabusa sided with Arai by revealing that he had purchased 5% stock of the company. Tetsuhiro Kuroda also refused to side with Fuyuki and this resulted in Hayabusa and Kuroda being paired to take on Mr. Gannosuke and Kintaro Kanemura in a tag team match, which they lost. Hayabusa made his first title defense of the WEW Heavyweight Championship against Mammoth Sasaki on July 30, where he retained the title. On August 3, Hayabusa offered to put his 5% stock if he, Goemon and Onryo lost the six-man tag team match to Mr. Gannosuke, Kintaro Kanemura and Mammoth Sasaki. Hayabusa was pinned by Kanemura and he agreed to put his 5% stock in a two out of three match series on August 11. The FMW team and Fuyuki's team were even with 1–1 score until Hayabusa lost the WEW Heavyweight Championship to Kanemura in the main event. As a result of losing the series, Hayabusa lost his 5% stock to Fuyuki and Fuyuki sold the stock to Stuart Levy. On September 5, Hayabusa defeated Kanemura to regain the title but the win was reversed by new FMW Vice President Senmu Yoshida, who returned the title to Kanemura.

On September 9, Hayabusa teamed with Tetsuhiro Kuroda and Goemon to defeat Kintaro Kanemura, Kodo Fuyuki and Mr. Gannosuke to win the WEW 6-Man Tag Team Championship. The following month, on October 9, Hayabusa and Kuroda defeated Gannosuke and Mammoth Sasaki to win the WEW Tag Team Championship. After the match, Sasaki challenged Hayabusa to a match which stipulated that if Hayabusa won then Shoichi Arai would be reinstated as FMW President. The match took place on October 22, during which Hayabusa had a career-ending injury when he attempted a springboard moonsault off the middle rope and lost footing, landing on his head, cracking two of his vertebrae and leaving him paralyzed. The injury provoked a high fever and required surgery. This injury ended his wrestling career. As he was considered the heart and soul of FMW, the company slowly folded after his departure.

== Post-retirement ==
Ezaki later pursued a career as a singer. He promoted a new wrestling company called WMF (Wrestlings Marvelous Future) that contained up-and-coming wrestlers. The name was chosen since, spelled backwards, the initials are FMW in honor of the late company. He traveled to a few WWE events where he met old friends such as Sabu, Rob Van Dam, and Rey Mysterio backstage. He also took photographs with John Cena, then WWE Champion Edge, then WWE Women's Champion Lita, Vince McMahon, Shane McMahon, Triple H, and Jeff Hardy.

Ezaki attended the PWU (Pro Wrestling Unplugged) FAHRENHEIT: 3RD DEGREE event on August 19, 2006, at the New Alhambra (formerly known as ECW Arena). This was his first appearance in the USA since 2000, the last time being at E3 in Los Angeles, helping promote TOKYOPOP's FMW DVDs by having a 6-man tag match. He also participated in a shoot interview with RF Video.

Ezaki was active in working with the Dragon Gate promotion. He recorded a debut album with Dragon Kid titled Trust! which came out in November 2007. He partook in the company's first US tour, joining them in their appearance in Los Angeles on September 5 and Hawaii on September 8, 2008. Ezaki also designed the tour's T-shirt. When asked about his career in an interview, Ezaki said that one never knows what the chances are of a return to the ring.

On April 3, 2015, Hayabusa was part of a press conference announcing the return of FMW. He served as the executive producer of the promotion.

== Legacy ==
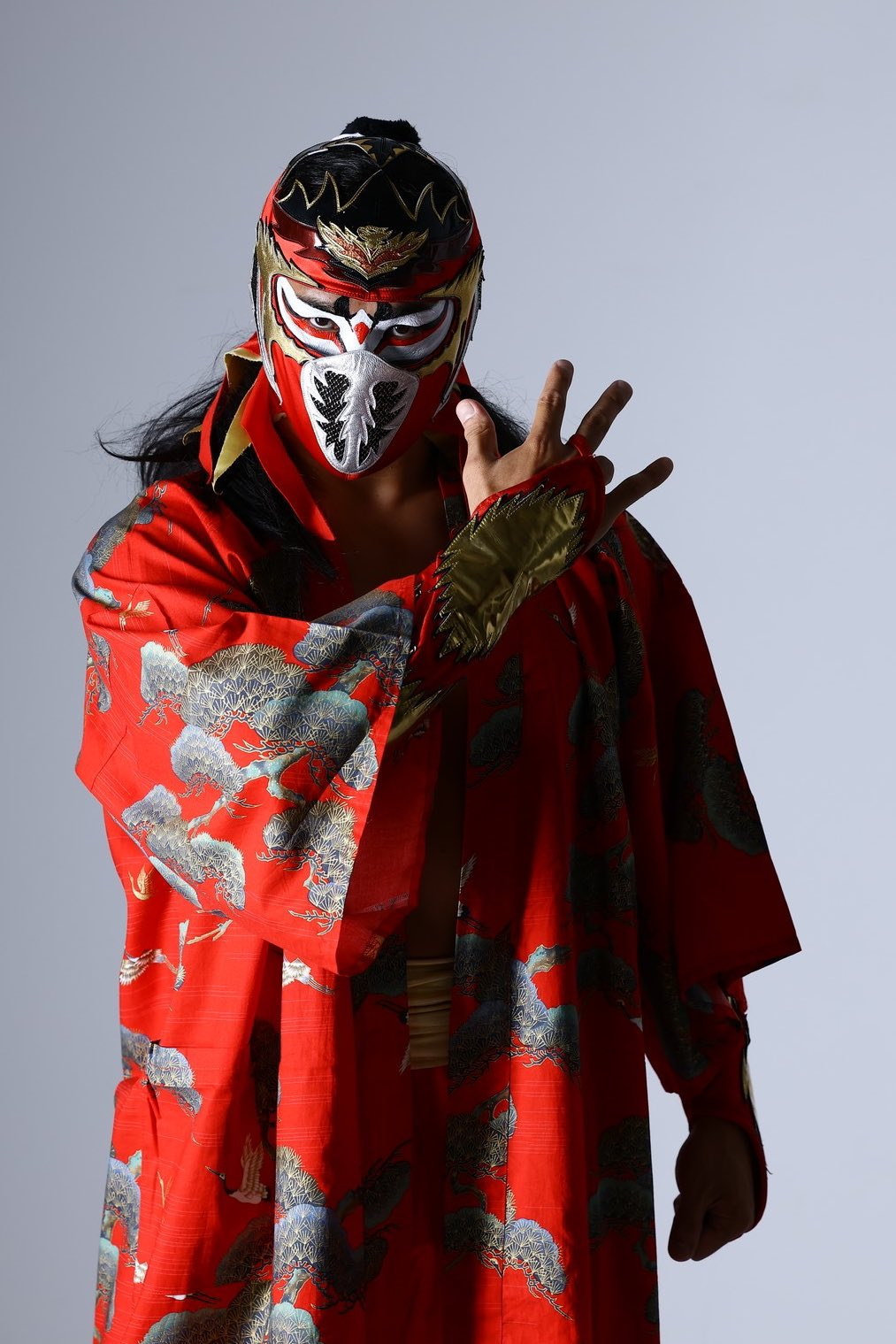
Shingo Suzuki as the new Hayabusa in 2025

Hayabusa (Eiji Ezaki) is widely regarded as a pivotal figure in professional wrestling, recognized as a pioneer of the high-flying junior heavyweight wrestling in Japan. Throughout his career, which was spent exclusively with Frontier Martial-Arts Wrestling (FMW), he became the promotion's second-most prominent star, following company founder Atsushi Onita.

Ezaki is credited with innovating several signature maneuvers, including the Falcon Arrow and Phoenix Splash. He also popularized the Firebird Splash, a move that gained significant prominence in North America as the 450° splash. Despite receiving offers from major international promotions—including New Japan Pro-Wrestling and World Wrestling Federation—Ezaki remained with FMW throughout his career, citing personal loyalty to the organization. Serving as the promotion’s ace, he was known for a physically demanding wrestling style and headlined many of the most significant matches in FMW history.

His match with Masato Tanaka on May 19, 1998, has been cited as one of the most notable matches of his career and has been ranked among the top matches in Frontier Martial Arts (FMW), alongside Combat Toyoda vs. Megumi Kudo at the 7th Anniversary Show. He was involved in rivalries with Mr. Gannosuke, Kodo Fuyuki and The Gladiator.

His feud with Gannosuke included multiple matches between 1997 and 2001 and was a central storyline in FMW during that period. The two headlined several major events, including the eighth, ninth and tenth Anniversary Shows as well as the main event of Goodbye Hayabusa II: Last Match, which marked the final appearance of the Hayabusa character in 1999.

Kevin Wilson reviewed on the 9th Anniversary Show encounter between the two that "both wrestlers played their roles well and they hit their major moves without any problems. I still think the Phoenix Splash is one of the top five most beautiful moves in wrestling (let's see... Phoenix Splash, Shooting Star Press, Space Flying Tiger Drop, Ultimo Dragon's Asai Moonsault, and a Dragonrana), and Hayabusa hit it perfectly. It was the perfect ending, as the two other times he had gone for the move in the match he had failed... he knew that to win the titles he had to hit his ultimate finisher. Overall a really fun match, it wasn't perfectly executed, but the good far outweighed the bad." Stuart of Puroresu Central stated that "Hayabusa's highspots were dazzling as always and Gannosuke's craftsmanship made them look better and very important. They fought almost one year exactly before this and Hayabusa smoked Gannosuke as a worker" and considered it "a worthy main event between two excellent wrestlers and undoubtedly the best match on the show."

Many of the industry's wrestlers like Chris Jericho, Jonathan Gresham, Jack Evans, AJ Styles, Pac, Will Ospreay, Samuray Del Sol, Kota Ibushi, Matt Sydal, Ricochet, Seth Rollins and Mustafa Ali were inspired by Hayabusa at some point in their careers.

On April 27, 2025, the Hayabusa character was brought back through Pro Wrestling Zero1 at the Lucha Festival Especial event held at Ryōgoku Kokugikan. At the event, this new Hayabusa, portrayed by Shingo Suzuki, defeated Masato Tanaka and continues to work predominately for Pro Wrestling Zero1.

== Other media ==
- As a musician, Hayabusa released three solo albums (one posthumously), an album with Dragon Kid, and an album with Koji Nakagawa and Masahiko.
- Hayabusa appears in the low-budget wrestling movie Backyard Dogs and in Mask de 41 as the "Red Falcon". He also appears as Eiji Ezaki in Baion.
- Hayabusa also appeared in the music video "Life Is...~another story~" by J-Pop artist Ken Hirai.
- Hayabusa appears in the Japan-exclusive Nintendo 64 games Virtual Pro Wrestling 64 and Virtual Pro Wrestling 2: Ōdō Keishō and the Japan-exclusive PlayStation 2 game Wrestle Kingdom 2: Pro Wrestling Sekai Taisen. He appears unofficially in WCW vs. nWo: World Tour, as Hannibal, in WCW/nWo Revenge, as Han Zo Mon, and in WCW vs. the World as Habanero.

== Personal life ==
Ezaki was the older of two sons. His maternal grandparents were owners of a hotel, which later his parents took over.

Ezaki married his wife Harumi on April 7, 1997. Together, they had two daughters, Ayane (born October 19, 1997) and Shie (born May 10, 1999). He and Harumi amicably divorced in 2004, but remained friends, while sharing custody of their daughters.

Ezaki's nephew, Takuro Ezaki, is a professional football player who currently belongs to Júbilo Iwata.

Ezaki had been close friends with Keiichi Yamada (best known as Jushin Thunder Liger) since 1994. The two had a falling out in 1996 after Ezaki turned down a deal with NJPW, but they mended their friendship in 2005.

In May 2005, he performed a play called The Shinichi Amano Story at the Tokyo Shinjuku Theater. He portrayed the main character's best friend Fuyuki Hayato, an injured air pilot soldier in World War II, who is reliant on a wheelchair. His performance was given positive reviews and the play was a huge success.

By 2015, Ezaki had regained the use of his legs and could stand on his own and walk with a cane.

== Death ==
Ezaki died of a cerebral hemorrhage on March 3, 2016, at age 47. His body was found when the owner of a nearby tavern, went to his home after Ezaki failed to arrive for their planned meeting.

== Championships and accomplishments ==
- All Japan Pro Wrestling
  - All Asia Tag Team Championship (1 time) – with Jinsei Shinzaki
- Frontier Martial Arts Wrestling
  - FMW Brass Knuckles Heavyweight Championship (3 times, final)
  - FMW Brass Knuckles Tag Team Championship (2 times) – with Masato Tanaka (1), Daisuke Ikeda (1)
  - FMW Independent Heavyweight Championship (1 time)
  - FMW World Street Fight 6-Man Tag Team Championship (2 times) – with Masato Tanaka and Koji Nakagawa (1), and Masato Tanaka and Hisakatsu Oya (1)
  - WEW 6-Man Tag Team Championship (2 times) – with Tetsuhiro Kuroda and Hisakatsu Oya (1), and Tetsuhiro Kuroda and Goemon (1)
  - WEW Heavyweight Championship (1 time)
  - WEW Tag Team Championship (2 times) – with Mr. Gannosuke (1), Tetsuhiro Kuroda (1)
  - FMW Double Championship #1 Contender's Tournament (1998)
- Pro Wrestling Illustrated
  - Ranked No. 38 of the top 500 singles wrestlers in the PWI 500 in 1998 and 1999
  - Ranked No. 255 of the 500 top singles wrestlers during the "PWI Years" in 2003
- Tokyo Sports
  - Fighting Spirit Award (1997)
  - Service Award (2016)

== Luchas de Apuestas record ==
Winner (wager)	Loser (wager)	Location	Event	Date	Notes
Hayabusa (mask)	Mr. Gannosuke (hair)	Yokohama, Japan	FMW 8th Anniversary Show	April 29, 1997	
Hayabusa (mask) and Masato Tanaka	Hido and Kodo Fuyuki (hair/championship)	Sapporo, Japan	Fuyuki-Army	April 17, 1998	

== See also ==
- List of premature professional wrestling deaths
