= Shoji Azuma =

Japanese linguist

Dr. Shoji Azuma
- 東照二
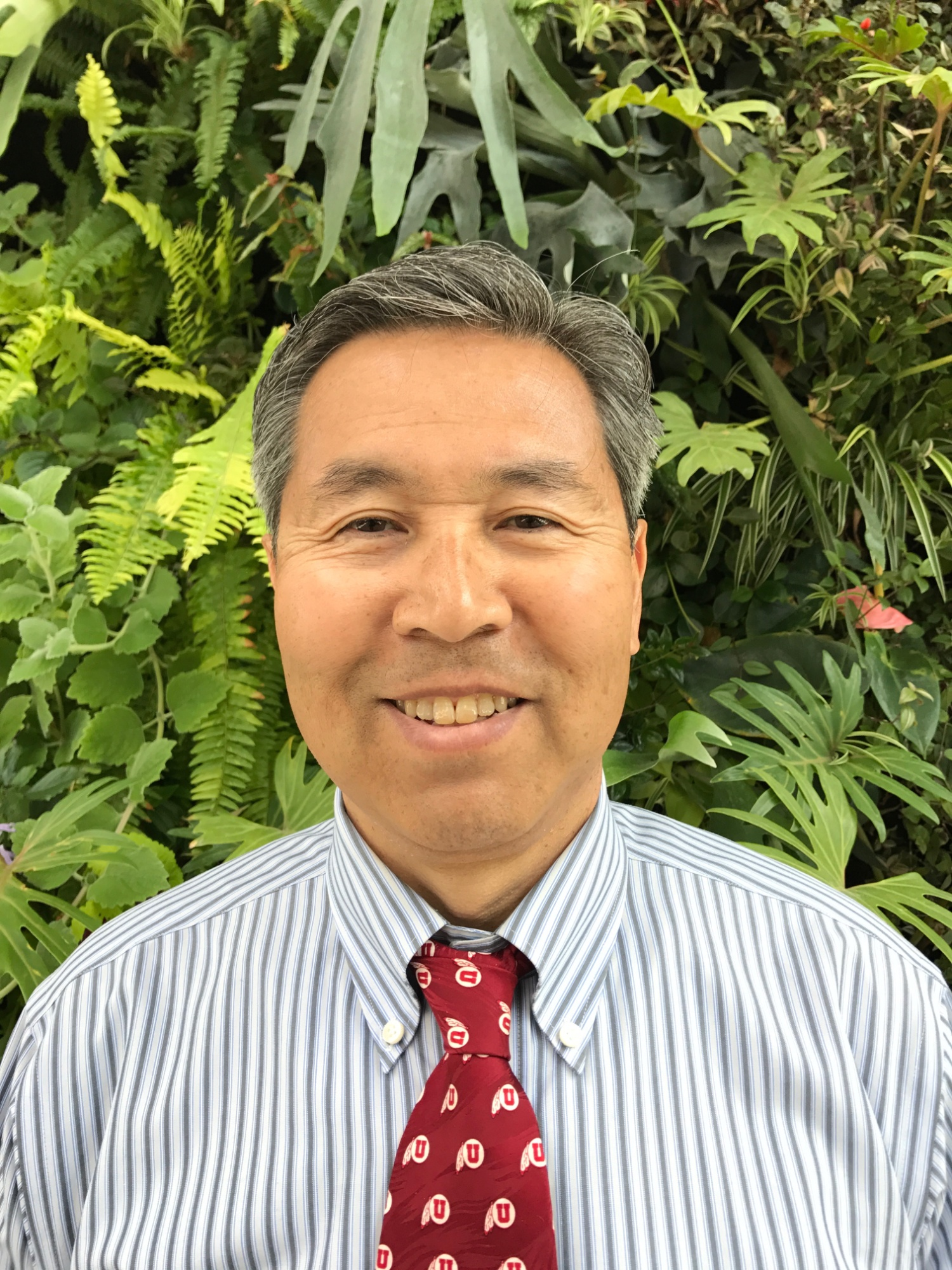
- Born: 14 February 1956; Suzu, Ishikawa Prefecture, Japan
- Education: Waseda University
- Occupations: Sociolinguist, professor, Ski Instructor, Author
- Awards: Consul-General of Japan Commendation Award (2021)

Shoji Azuma (Japanese: 東 照二, Hepburn: Azuma Shōji; 1956年 –) is a Japanese sociolinguist, ski instructor, author and Professor of World Languages and Cultures at the University of Utah (Salt Lake City, Utah, USA).

== Background ==
Shoji Azuma was born in the city of Suzu in Ishikawa Prefecture, Japan. He graduated from Waseda University in 1978 with a degree in English Studies. In 1987, he received a master's degree in linguistics from the University of Utah and in 1991, a PhD in linguistics from the University of Texas. He has served as a professor at Ritsumeikan University Graduate School of Language Education and Information Science in Kyoto, Japan and at the University of Utah School of Linguistics in Salt Lake City, Utah. His specialty is sociolinguistics and has made multiple appearances on major Japanese media outlets where he provides commentary on political speeches from an academic perspective.

On 28 July 2021 Shoji received the Consul-General's Award from the Consulate-General of Japan in Denver for his contributions towards friendship between Japan and the USA.

== Publications ==
- (1990) A Frame Based Processing Model of Code-Switching.
- (1997) Speech accommodation and Japanese Emperor Hirohito
- (1997) Lexical Categories and Code-Switching: A Study of Japanese/English Code-Switching in Japan
- (1998) How do Japanese say No in the Written Mode?
- (2011) Soapbox Speeches in the Summer of Seiken Kōtai.
- (2014) Japanese Earthquake Slogans and the Persistence of Wakimae ('discernment')
- (2015) How Do Strangers Speak on a Ski Lift in North American Ski Resorts? – A Discourse Analysis of Small Talk
- (2022) A Study of Former Japanese Prime Minister Abe's Speaking Style in 2020: Listener-Oriented or Speaker-Oriented?
- (2022) Japanese Americans and generational tension: a case of the ethnic press the Utah Nippoo during World War II
