= Shoji Tomihisa =

Japanese track and field athlete

Personal information
- Nationality: Japanese
- Born: Awaji Island, Hyōgo Prefecture

Sport
- Country: Japan
- Sport: Athletics
- Event(s): 60m, 100m

Shoji Tomihisa was a Japanese track and field athlete who was also an atomic bomb survivor. He was a hibakusha, a survivor of the atomic bombing of Hiroshima. He also holds the Japanese national record in men's 60m in the 100~104 age category. He rose to prominence and limelight after competing at the 2017 Chugoku Region Masters Athletics Championship.

== Biography ==
Tomihisa was born on Awaji Island in the Hyōgo Prefecture. He was drafted into the Imperial Japanese Army at the age of 21. He faced leaps and bounds in his military career as he faced near-death experiences during his brief stint and tenure in China. Soon after returning to Japan, he received a job offer at Japanese National Railways. He was one of the survivors of the Atomic bombings of Hiroshima and Nagasaki which took place in August 1945. He was eventually exposed to the radiation which was emitted from the fatal atomic bombings in 1945. It was revealed that he had to face the misery and agony of the Hiroshima bombings, as coincidentally he was engaged in rescue operations during that occasion and as a result he was directly impacted by the radiation of the atomic bombings.

== Career ==
He began his track and field athletic career journey at the age of 97 defying the odds, adversity and stereotypes despite the age factor. He was inspired by his own friend Hiromi Sadasue who was also an osteopathic physician to pursue his interest in athletics. He shattered the Japanese national record in men's 100~104 age category, when he set a new record clocking in at 16.98 seconds in the 60 meters event during the 2017 Chugoku Masters Track and Field meet which was held at Tottori Prefecture. Soon after his outstanding display of running at the age of 102, he received acclaim, spotlight and widespread media attention and even the official Twitter handle of historyinmemes shared a post praising Tomihisa's athleticism by indicating, "102-year-old Shoji Tomihisa competes in a race and proves that age is just a number." He also showed his sprinting skills by announcing his arrival in the 100m event.

He was selected as one of the frontrunners in contention as a torchbearer for the COVID-19 pandemic delayed 2020 Summer Olympics. He received the honor and invitation to take part in a nationwide torch relay at the age of 102 which was held in Hiroshima. However, the impact of the COVID-19 pandemic initially prompted the organizers of the Tokyo Olympics to cancel the planned torch relay on public roads, and it also nearly brought an abrupt end to Tomihisa's hopes of carrying the torch in the Tokyo Olympics, which was eventually dubbed the "Recovery Games" as a mark of tribute and respect to the casualties and victims of the 2011 Tōhoku earthquake and tsunami. Later, it was revealed that Tomihisa himself withdrew from taking part in carrying the Olympic flame and also cancelled his participation in running around Hiroshima Peace Memorial Park among the allotted list of runners officially chosen for the occasion as he pulled out as a precautionary measure owing to concerns related to the rapid resurgence of coronavirus infections.

In May 2022, he announced his retirement from the sport at the age of 105 and a special ceremony to mark the occasion was held at his usual practice training ground at Miyoshi Sports Park Field in Miyoshi. He made the tough decision to quit the sport after realizing that his physical strength began to wane and fade away gradually.
