= Jado =

Japanese professional wrestler

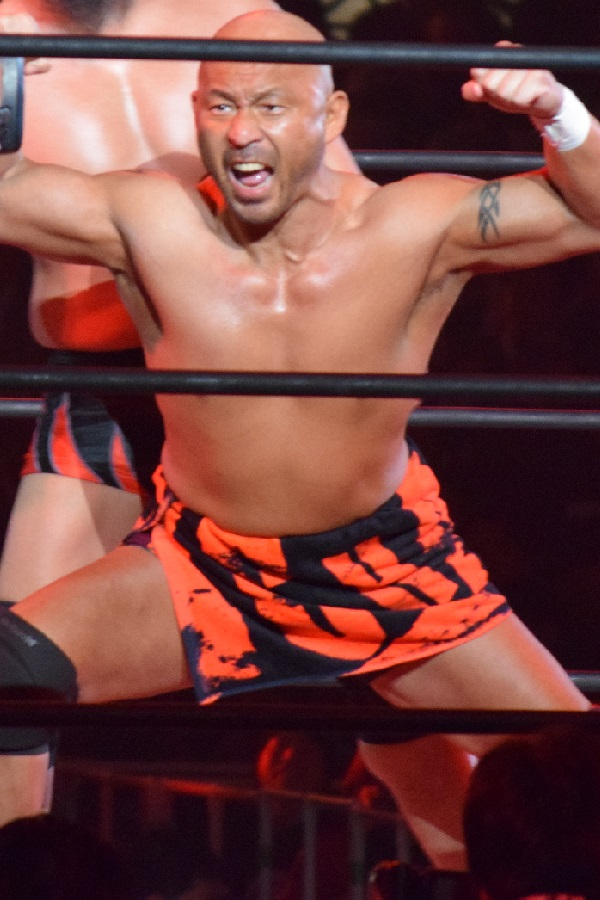
- Jado in 2017

Personal information
- Born: Shoji Akiyoshi (秋吉 昭二, Akiyoshi Shōji); September 28, 1968 (age 57) Minato, Tokyo, Japan

Professional wrestling career
- Ring name(s): Captain Noah; Coolie S.Z. C.T.U Ranger Blue; Jado; Punish; Shoji Akiyoshi
- Billed height: 5 ft 10 in (1.78 m)
- Billed weight: 218 lb (99 kg)
- Trained by: Gran Hamada
- Debut: March 19, 1989

Shoji Akiyoshi (秋吉 昭二, Akiyoshi Shōji) (born September 28, 1968) is a Japanese professional wrestler, manager and booker better known by the ring name Jado (邪道, Jadō). He is best known for his work in New Japan Pro-Wrestling (NJPW) as part of a tag team with his partner Gedo. Jado and Gedo's careers have largely paralleled each other, except for a brief period Jado spent in Universal Lucha Libre in 1993, a stint in Frontier Martial-Arts Wrestling (FMW) in 1997 where they were on opposing sides, and Jado not having emulated Gedo's tour of North America with World Championship Wrestling. The World Class Tag team has held numerous championships in wrestling, including NJPW's IWGP Junior Heavyweight Tag Team Championship, the Universal Wrestling Association's UWA/UWF Intercontinental Tag Team Title, and Dragon Gate's International Junior Heavyweight Tag Team Championship, as well as having won NJPW's Super J Tag League once. Jado and Gedo are co-head bookers of NJPW.

== Professional wrestling career ==
=== Early career (1989–1991) ===
Under his real name, Akiyoshi debuted for Frontier Martial-Arts Wrestling, losing to Masanobu Kurisu. He joined New Japan Pro-Wrestling (NJPW) as part of the Takeshi Puroresu Gundan (TPG) stable (NJPW's parody of the World Wrestling Federation's "Rock 'n Wrestling" era). After TPG disbanded, Akiyoshi and TPG comrade Keiji Takayama left NJPW.

=== Universal Wrestling Association; Consejo Mundial de Lucha Libre (1991–1993) ===
In April 1991, Akiyoshi and Takayama began wrestling for the Universal Wrestling Association in Mexico, as "Punish" and "Crush" respectively. On November 8, 1991, they won their first championship, defeating Silver King and El Texano for the UWA/UWF Intercontinental Tag Team Championship. After holding the championship for over 200 days, they lost it to Shu El Guerrero and Scorpio, Jr., and regained it six days later. On June 21, 1992, they split up and vacated the championship. After leaving UWA, they joined Consejo Mundial de Lucha Libre for a few months, wrestling mostly in six or eight-man tag team matches.

=== Wrestling International New Generations (1993–1994) ===
Akiyoshi and Takayama debuted for Wrestling International New Generations (W*ING) on July 11, 1993 (as "Jado" and "Gedo"), teaming with Freddie Krueger to defeat Miguelito Perez, Mitsuhiro Matsunaga and Yukihiro Kanemura in a WarGames match. On September 26, Jado won his first singles championship by defeating Yukihiro Kanemura for the WWC Caribbean Heavyweight Championship. While champion, he and Gedo defeated The Headhunters to win the vacant W*NG World Tag Team Championship, but lost it back to them days later. Jado then unsuccessfully challenged W*NG Heavyweight Champion, Crypt Keeper. In their final month at W*ING, they faced The Headhunters again, and lost. When they left, Jado vacated the Caribbean Heavyweight Championship.

=== Wrestle Association R (1994–1996) ===
Jado and Gedo debuted for Wrestle Association R (WAR) in 1994, and became a top tag team. They teamed with Hiromichi Fuyuki in the WAR World Six-Man Tag Team Championship tournament, defeating Genichiro Tenryu, Animal Hamaguchi and Koki Kitahara in the final to win the title, on June 6, 1994. On August 26, the trio lost the championship to Bob Backlund, Scott Putski and Warlord, and regained it a month later. They won this championship three more times, in 1995 and 1996.

=== Frontier Martial-Arts Wrestling (1997–2001) ===
Jado and Gedo left WAR, for Frontier Martial-Arts Wrestling, one of Japan's top independent promotions. Jado, Gedo, and Fuyuki (now called "Kodo" Fuyuki) won the FMW World Street Fight 6-Man Tag Team Championship, defeating The Headhunters and Hisakatsu Oya on March 21, 1997. They vacated it on July 8. On January 16, 1998, Jado won the FMW World Street Fight 6-Man Tag Team Championship with Mr. Gannosuke and Yukihiro Kanemura, and lost it to Atsushi Onita, Koji Nakagawa and Tetsuhiro Kuroda a month later.

Jado participated in the FMW Double Championship number one contender tournament, losing in the semifinals to Hayabusa.

He began teaming with Gedo again in the spring of 1998. They unsuccessfully challenged Hayabusa & Masato Tanaka for the FMW Brass Knuckles Tag Team Championship. On December 11, 1999, Jado and Gedo teamed with Koji Nakagawa to win the WEW 6-Man Tag Team Championship. In April 2000, they lost it to Kodo Fuyuki, Kyoko Inoue and Chocoball Mukai, regained it a month later, then lost it back again 20 days later. On July 14, 2000, Jado and Gedo defeated H and Tetsuhiro Kuroda for the WEW World Tag Team Championship, losing it to Masao Inoue & Yoshinobu Kanemaru.

=== New Japan Pro-Wrestling (2001–present) ===
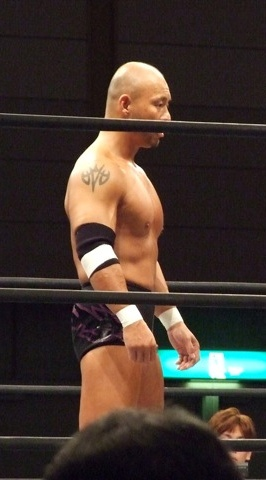
Jado in June 2011

Jado left FMW in 2001, along with Masato Tanaka, Gedo, Hideki Hosaka, and Kaori Nakayama. The group became freelancers and Jado and Gedo eventually returned to New Japan Pro-Wrestling. They became IWGP Junior Heavyweight Tag Team Champions by defeating Jyushin Thunder Liger and El Samurai on July 20, 2001. In the G1 Junior Tag League 2001, they reached the final before losing to Liger and Samurai. In the Teisen Hall Cup Tag Team Tournament, they teamed with Koji Kanemoto and lost to Liger, Osamu Nishimura and Tatsumi Fujinami. Liger once again got the better of Jado and Gedo when he and Minoru Tanaka beat them for the Junior Heavyweight Tag Team Championship.

Jado participated in the Best of the Super Juniors IX with little success, winning only one match and therefore not progressing. He bounced back quickly by teaming with Gedo and Koji Kanemoto to win the Junior Triathlon Survivor tournament.

On October 13, 2003 at Ultimate Crush II, Jado won an eleven-man battle royal for the IWGP Junior Heavyweight Championship. During his time as champion, he and Gedo regained the Junior Heavyweight Tag Team Championship, on November 29. Jado soon lost the Junior Heavyweight Championship to Heat, and lost the Junior Heavyweight Tag Team Championship to American Dragon and Curry Man.

On June 5, 2004, Jado and Gedo won the tag title for a third time, and held it for over nine months and through five defenses. They lost the title to Kanemoto and Wataru Inoue on March 4, 2005. During their third reign, Jado and Gedo joined Jyushin Thunder Liger's stable, CTU (Control Terrorism Unit). On July 8, 2006, they won the tag title for a fourth time by defeating El Samurai and Ryusuke Taguchi. They held the title for ten months, before losing it to Taka Michinoku and Dick Togo on May 2, 2007.

Following the championship loss, Jado and Gedo left CTU just before it broke up, and joined GBH (Great Bash Heel). In the next few years, Jado and Gedo named their team The World Class Tag Team. They joined GBH's splinter faction, Chaos, in 2009. They then suffered several setbacks; Gedo spent most of 2009 out with injuries, and a few months after Gedo's return, Jado was injured in early 2010 and wouldn't return until September 3.

On November 13, 2010, Jado and Gedo returned to tag team contention by defeating CHAOS stablemates, Davey Richards and Rocky Romero, in the finals of a five-day-long tournament to win the 2010 Super J Tag League. As a result, they received a match for the Junior Heavyweight Tag Team Championship at a Dramatic Dream Team (DDT) event on December 26, where they were defeated by the defending champions, the Golden☆Lovers (Kenny Omega and Kota Ibushi).

At the end of 2011, the Wrestling Observer Newsletter named Gedo and Jado the "Bookers of the Year", for the first of four consecutive years. On November 1, 2013, Jado and Gedo received their first shot at the IWGP Junior Heavyweight Tag Team Championship in three years, but were defeated by the defending champions, Suzuki-gun (Taichi and Taka Michinoku).

In early 2015, Jado took over as the booker of Pro Wrestling Noah, leaving the booking of New Japan primarily to Gedo, while also starting to work for the promotion under a mask as "Captain Noah", a comedy character similar to Captain New Japan. On January 4, 2016, Jado returned to NJPW unmasked to take part in the New Japan Rumble on the Wrestle Kingdom 10 pre-show. Entering as the last of 18 participants, he eliminated Shiro Koshinaka and Ryusuke Taguchi to win the match. On June 12, 2016, Jado reunited with Gedo to unsuccessfully challenge Atsushi Kotoge and Daisuke Harada for Noah's GHC Junior Heavyweight Tag Team Championship in a three-way match, also involving Taichi and Taka Michinoku. On October 8, Jado and Gedo defeated Kotoge and Harada to win the GHC Junior Heavyweight Tag Team Championship. They lost the title back to Kotoge and Harada on December 24.

On October 8, 2018, at King of Pro-Wrestling, Jado defected from Chaos and aligned himself with the Bullet Club OG's, alongside Jay White and Gedo.

== Championships and accomplishments ==
- Big Japan Pro Wrestling
  - BJW Tag Team Championship (1 time) – with Gedo
- Dragon Gate
  - Dragon Gate I-J Heavyweight Tag Team Championship (1 time) – with Gedo
- Dramatic Dream Team
  - Ironman Heavymetalweight Championship (1 time)
- Frontier Martial-Arts Wrestling
  - WEW World Tag Team Championship (1 time) – with Gedo
  - WEW Hardcore Tag Team Championship (1 time) – with Gedo
  - FMW World Street Fight 6-Man Tag Team Championship (2 times) – with Gedo and Hiromichi Fuyuki (1) and Mr. Gannosuke and Yukihiro Kanemura (1)
  - WEW 6-Man Tag Team Championship (4 times) – with Gedo and Koji Nakagawa (2), Gedo and Kaori Nakayama (1) and Gedo and Masato Tanaka (1)
- New Japan Pro-Wrestling
  - IWGP Junior Heavyweight Championship (1 time)
  - IWGP Junior Heavyweight Tag Team Championship (4 times) – with Gedo
  - New Japan Rumble (2016)
  - Super J Tag League (2010) – with Gedo
  - IWGP Junior Heavyweight Tag Team Title Tournament (2003) - with Gedo
- Pro Wrestling Illustrated
  - PWI ranked him #150 of the top 500 singles wrestlers in the PWI 500 in 2014
- Pro Wrestling Noah
  - GHC Junior Heavyweight Tag Team Championship (1 time) – with Gedo
- Tokyo Sports
  - Best Tag Team Award (2001) – with Gedo
- Toryumon X
  - UWA World Trios Championship (1 time) – with Gedo and Katsushi Takemura
- Universal Wrestling Federation
  - UWA/UWF Intercontinental Tag Team Championship (2 time) – with Crush
- Wrestle Association "R"
  - WAR World Six-Man Tag Team Championship (5 times) – with Gedo and Hiromichi Fuyuki
  - WAR World Six-Man Tag Team Championship Tournament (1994) - with Hiromichi Fuyuki and Gedo
- Wrestling International New Generations
  - WWC Caribbean Heavyweight Championship (1 time)
- Wrestling Observer Newsletter
  - Best Booker (2011–2014) – with Gedo
