= Independent circuit =

Grouping of small professional wrestling promotions

In professional wrestling, the independent circuit (often shortened to the indie circuit or the indies) is the collective name of independently owned promotions which are deemed to be smaller and more regionalized than major national promotions. There have also been smaller national and global independent promotions that have toured on a larger scale such as Juggalo Championship Wrestling (JCW), Deadlock Pro-Wrestling (DPW), Wrestling Revolver, Game Changer Wrestling (GCW), House of Hardcore (HOH), House of Glory (HOG), Mystery Wrestling, Evolve, Revolution Pro Wrestling (RevPro), and Maple Leaf Pro Wrestling (MLP).

Independent promotions are, for the majority of the time, viewed as a minor league or farm system for the larger national promotions, as wrestlers in "indie" companies (especially young wrestlers just starting their careers, and wrestlers in larger Indie promotions) are usually honing their craft with the goal of being noticed and signed by a major national promotion such as WWE, All Elite Wrestling (AEW) (which also owns Ring of Honor (ROH)), or Total Nonstop Action Wrestling in the United States, Lucha Libre AAA Worldwide (which is owned by WWE) or Consejo Mundial de Lucha Libre in Mexico, or New Japan Pro-Wrestling, All Japan Pro Wrestling, World Wonder Ring Stardom or one of the CyberFight promotions in Japan. It is also not uncommon for veteran wrestlers who have had past tenures with major promotions to appear on independent shows, either as special attractions or as a way to prolong their careers as free agents. There are also wrestlers who do not wish to sign with any of the major promotions and therefore primarily depend on the independent circuit for work.

== Origins ==
The "indie" scene in the United States dates back to the days of regional territories. When a promoter ran opposition in even one town controlled by a National Wrestling Alliance sanctioned territory, they were often called an "outlaw" territory. This is considered by some to be a forerunner to indies since some stars of the past got their start in these low quality local rivals to the big regional territories.

The modern definition of the independent circuit came about in the mid to late 1980s and fully formed and flourished after 1990. These promotions initially sought to revive the feel of old school territorial wrestling after former territories either went national, such as WWF, went out of business, or eventually did both, such as WCW. Several indies did manage to tour different towns within a region and maintain a consistent schedule.

After Vince McMahon, seeking regulatory relief, gave in 1989 testimony in front of the New Jersey State Athletic Commission where he publicly admitted pro wrestling was a sports-based entertainment, rather than a true athletic competition, many state athletic commissions stopped regulating wrestling. This obviated the need for complying with many expensive requirements, such as the need for an on-site ambulance and trained emergency medical personnel at each bout. After the business was thus exposed and deregulated, just about anyone could be a promoter or a wrestler since no licensing beyond a business license was then required. Many thought they could save money by holding shows in smaller towns and smaller venues with little to no televised exposure, leading to many shows being held only once a week or once a month in local towns.

== By country ==
=== United States ===
Independent promotions are usually local in focus and, lacking national TV contracts, are much more dependent on revenue from house show attendance. Due to their lower budgets, most independent promotions offer low salaries (it is not unusual for a wrestler to work for free due to the fact that most promoters can only afford to pay well-known talent). Most cannot afford to regularly rent large venues, and would not be able to attract a large enough crowd to fill such a venue were they able to do so. Instead, they make use of almost any open space (such as fields, ballrooms, or gymnasiums) to put on their performances. Some independent promotions are attached to professional wrestling schools, serving as a venue for students to gain experience in front of an audience. As independent matches are seldom televised, indie wrestlers who have not already gained recognition in other promotions tend to remain in obscurity. However, scouts from major promotions attend indie shows, and an indie wrestler who makes a good impression may be offered a developmental or even a full professional contract.

The advent of the Internet has allowed independent wrestlers and promotions to reach a wider audience, and it is possible for wrestlers regularly working the indie circuit to gain some measure of fame among wrestling fans online. Additionally, some of the more successful indies have video distribution deals, streaming deals with platforms such as Triller TV, Independent Wrestling TV, Title Match Network, and Highspots, operate their own streaming services such as WWNLive or Psychopathic Live, or use existing video streaming and sharing platforms such as YouTube and Twitch, giving them an additional source of income and allowing them to reach a larger audience outside of their local areas.

Top 10 most-attended shows
| No. | Promoter | Event | Location | Venue | Attendance | Main Event(s) | Ref |
|---|---|---|---|---|---|---|---|
| — | NWA-NE | WRKO's Taste of the Boss; September 25, 1999 | Boston, Massachusetts | Boston City Hall Plaza | 35,000 | 5-0 (Trooper Gilmore and Corporal Johnson) vs. Victor Rivera and Jay Kobain | |
| — | IWR | Warped Tour 2002; August 3, 2003 | Pontiac, Michigan | Pontiac Silverdome | 19,000 | Deranged vs. Tommy Starr in a UV Light Tube Death match | |
| — | BELIEVE | BELIEVE 156; April 21, 2018 | Orlando, Florida | Central Florida Fairgrounds | 15,000 | Aaron Epic (c) vs. Andrew Merlin for the SCW Florida Heavyweight Championship | |
| — | AWF | Cement Belt Fair; June 21, 1990 | Cementon, Pennsylvania | Cementon Fairgrounds | 12,500 | Heidi Lee Morgan vs. Baby Face Nellie | |
| — | WPW | OC Fair: Flower Power (Day 2); July 23, 2006 | Costa Mesa, California | Washington Mutual Arena | 12,000 | El Hijo del Santo, Lil Cholo and Silver Tyger vs. Infernal, Super Kendo 2 and Super Parka | |
| 1. | — | All In; September 1, 2018 | Hoffman Estates, Illinois | Sears Centre Arena | 11,263 | The Golden Elite (Kota Ibushi, Matt Jackson and Nick Jackson) vs. Bandido, Rey Fénix and Rey Mysterio in a six-man tag team match | |
| — | WPW | OC Fair: Flower Power (Day 1); July 22, 2006 | Costa Mesa, California | Washington Mutual Arena | 10,000 | El Hijo del Santo, Lil Cholo and Silver Tyger vs. Infernal, Super Kendo 2 and Super Parka | |
| — | HWA | BaseBrawl; July 19, 2003 | Columbus, Ohio | Cooper Stadium | 8,757 (Note: This was part of a post-game show for an MLB game between the Columbus Clippers vs. Louisville Bats.) | Rory Fox (c) vs. Shark Boy for the HWA Cruiserweight Championship | |
| 2. | USWA | Memphis Memories; March 7, 1994 | Memphis, Tennessee | Mid-South Coliseum | 8,377 | Jerry Lawler vs. Austin Idol vs. Brian Christopher vs. Doug Gilbert vs. Eddie Gilbert vs. Jimmy Valiant vs. Koko B. Ware vs. Moondog Spot vs. Terry Funk vs. Tommy Rich in a 10-man elimination match | |
| — | WXW | Sportsfest; July 12, 1998 | Allentown, Pennsylvania | Cedar Beach Park | 8,000 | The Love Connection (Jay Love and Georgie Love) vs. D'Lo Brown and Owen Hart | |
| 3. | USWA / WWF | USWA vs. WWF; February 17, 1996 | Memphis, Tennessee | Mid-South Coliseum | 7,500 | Bret Hart (c) vs. Jerry Lawler in a Steel Cage match for the WWF World Heavyweight Championship | |
| 4. | FMLL | LuchaMania USA Tour; January 26, 2013 | Los Angeles, California | Los Angeles Memorial Sports Arena | 7,000 | Blue Demon Jr., Cien Caras Jr. and Dr. Wagner Jr. vs. El Hijo del Santo, L.A. Par-K and Rayo de Jalisco Jr. in a six-man tag team match | |
| 5. | JCP | Ric Flair's Last Match; July 31, 2022 | Nashville, Tennessee | Nashville Municipal Auditorium | 6,800 | Ric Flair and Andrade El Idolo vs. Jay Lethal and Jeff Jarrett | |
| 6. | FMW / WWA | FMW vs. WWA; May 16, 1992 | Los Angeles, California | Cal State-Los Angeles Gym | 6,250 | Atsushi Onita, Tarzan Goto and El Hijo del Santo vs. Negro Casas, Horace Boulder and Tim Patterson in a Best 2-out-of-3 Falls Street Fight match | |
| — | IWC | Big Butler Fair; June 28, 2003 | Prospect, Pennsylvania | Big Butler Fairgrounds | 6,000 | Dusty Rhodes vs. Jerry Lawler | |
| 7. | Multiple | World Wrestling Peace Festival; June 1, 1996 | Los Angeles, California | Los Angeles Sports Arena | 5,964 | Antonio Inoki and Dan Severn vs. Yoshiaki Fujiwara and Oleg Taktarov | |
| 8. | ECW | November to Remember; November 1, 1998 | New Orleans, Louisiana | Lakefront Arena | 5,800 | The Triple Threat (Shane Douglas, Bam Bam Bigelow and Chris Candido) vs. New Triple Threat (Sabu, Rob Van Dam and Taz) | |
| 8. | JCW | Bloodymania; August 11, 2007 | Cave-In-Rock, Illinois | Hatchet Landings | 5,800 | Sabu and The Insane Clown Posse (Shaggy 2 Dope and Violent J) vs. Trent Acid and The Young Altar Boys (Young Altar Boy #1 and Young Altar Boy #4) | |
| 9. | FCW | Pride; September 24, 2005 | Inglewood, California | Great Western Forum | 5,500 | Blue Demon Jr., El Hijo del Santo, Mil Mascaras and Tinieblas vs. Dr. Wagner Jr., Scorpio Jr. and Los Guerreros del Infierno (Rey Bucanero and Ultimo Guerrero) | |
| 10. | — | Funk Free for All; October 28, 1993 | Amarillo, Texas | Amarillo Civic Center | 5,500 | Terry Funk vs. Eddie Gilbert in a Texas Death match | |

=== Canada ===
Top 10 most-attended shows
| No. | Promoter | Event | Location | Venue | Attendance | Main Event(s) | Ref |
|---|---|---|---|---|---|---|---|
| — | Lutte 2000 | Alouettes Mania I August 25, 2002 | Montreal, Quebec | Stade Percival-Molson | 20,000 | Jacques Rougeau vs. King Kong Bundy | |
| — | LF | Alouettes Mania III; July 15, 2004 | Montreal, Quebec | Stade Percival-Molson | 20,000 (Note: This was part of a halftime show for a CFL game between the Montreal Alouettes vs. Calgary Stampeders.) | Jacques Rougeau vs. Kamala | |
| — | LF | Alouettes Mania IV; July 8, 2005 | Montreal, Quebec | Stade Percival-Molson | 20,000 (Note: This was part of a halftime show for a CFL game between the Montreal Alouettes vs. Edmonton Eskimos.) | Jim Duggan vs. Kurrgan with special referee Jacques Rougeau | |
| 1. | Lutte 2000 | Pierre Carl Ouellet vs. Kurrgan; December 30, 2001 | Montreal, Quebec | Centre Bell | 5,500+ (Note: There are different reports on the attendance of the event with numbers ranging from 5,500 to as high as 10,000 and 12,000.) | Pierre Carl Ouellet vs. Kurrgan with special referee Sid Vicious | |
| 2. | — | Stu Hart 50th Anniversary Show; December 15, 1995 | Calgary, Alberta | Stampede Corral | 4,600 | Bret Hart (c) vs. The British Bulldog for the WWF World Heavyweight Championship | |
| 3. | LF | Jacques Rougeau's Super Wrestling Family Gala; December 27, 2008 | Verdun, Quebec | Verdun Auditorium | 4,300 | Jacques Rougeau Jr. and J.J. Rougeau (c) vs. Eric Mastrocola and Taloche the Clown for the Johnny Rougeau Tag Team Championship | |
| 4. | Lutte 2000 | Pierre Carl Ouellet vs. King Kong Bundy; December 29, 2000 | Verdun, Quebec | Verdun Auditorium | 4,000 | Pierre Carl Ouellet vs. King Kong Bundy | |
| 5. | CWI | Brawl at the Bush II; May 14, 2011 | Brantford, Ontario | Brantford Civic Centre | 3,600 | Haven, Lanny Poffo, Brutus Beefcake and Bushwhacker Luke vs. Big Daddy Hammer, Virgil and The Nasty Boys (Brian Knobbs and Jerry Sags) in a Survivor Series elimination match | |
| 6. | JRP | Richard Charland vs. Abdullah the Butcher; July 15, 1995 | Montreal, Quebec | Verdun Auditorium | 3,500 | Richard Charland vs. Abdullah the Butcher | |
| 6. | LF | Jacques Rougeau's Super Wrestling Family Gala; December 27, 2009 | Montreal, Quebec | Verdun Auditorium | 3,500 | Jacques Rougeau and Giant Martin vs. Kurrgan and Eric Mastrocola | |
| 7. | Gatineau Pro wrestling (GPW) | Guerre civil 4 | Gatineau, Quebec | Centre Slush Puppie | 3,242 | Thunder VS Darko (heavy weight championship) | |
| 8. | NOTP | Night of Thunder; February 12, 2000 | Winnipeg, Manitoba | Winnipeg Convention Centre | 3,000 | Chi Chi Cruz vs. Scott D'Amore | |
| 8. | LF | Jacques Rougeau Jr. Retirement Tour (Day 1); December 28, 2010 | Montréal, Quebec | Verdun Auditorium | 3,000 | Jacques Rougeau Jr. and J.J. Rougeau vs. Eric Mastrocola and Sylver | |
| 9. | Lutte 2000 | L'Union Fait La Force IV; December 29, 1999 | Montreal, Quebec | Centre Pierre Charbonneau | 2,600 | The Fabulous Rougeaus (Jacques Rougeau and Raymond Rougeau) vs. The Garvin Brothers (Ron Garvin and Jimmy Garvin) for the Johnny Rougeau Memorial Tag Team Championship | |
| 10. | BSE | Welcome to Mexico! (Day 1); July 18, 2009 | Toronto, Ontario | Harbourfront Centre | 2,500 | James Champagne, La Sombra and The KGB vs. Incógnito, Xtremo and Blue Demon Jr. | |
| 11. | Lutte 2000 | L'Union Fait la Force; February 14, 1999 | Montreal, Quebec | Pierre-Charbonneau Arena | 2,200 | 14-man Battle Royal | |
| 11. | BCW | Rumble on the River; July 15, 2000 | Windsor, Ontario | Riverfront Festival Plaza | 2,200 | Sabu (c) vs. Geza Kalman for the BCW Can-Am Heavyweight Championship | |

=== Australia ===
Unlike the North American or Japanese products which have large, globally renowned organisations such as WWE and New Japan Pro-Wrestling with several hundred smaller promotions, Australia only has approximately 30 smaller independent circuit promotions which exist in all but one of the states and territories, that being the Northern Territory. Tours from the North American product are regularly sold out in capital cities such as Melbourne, Sydney, Perth and Brisbane.

Top 10 most-attended shows
| No. | Promoter | Event | Location | Venue | Attendance | Main Event(s) | Ref |
|---|---|---|---|---|---|---|---|
| 1. | AWF | Wrestleriot; February 26, 1993 | Melbourne, Victoria | Festival Hall | 4,000 | Jake Roberts vs. Jim Neidhart | |
| 2. | AWF | Wrestleriot 2 June 18, 1993 | Sydney, New South Wales | | 3,500 | Road Warrior Hawk vs. Demolition Smash | |
| 2. | AWF | Wrestleriot 2 June 24, 1993 | Melbourne, Victoria | | 3,500 | Nailz vs. Big Boss Man | |
| 2. | HRCW | High Risk Championship Wrestling TV; July 17, 1999 | Melbourne, Victoria | Festival Hall | 3,500 | Nailz vs. Primo Carnera III | |
| 3. | WSW | International Incident (Day 1); October 5, 2005 | Melbourne, Victoria | | 2,500+ (Note: There are different reports on the attendance of the event with numbers ranging from 2,500 to 3,000.) | Jeff Jarrett vs. Rhino for the inaugural WSW Heavyweight Championship | |
| 4. | AWF | Wrestleriot; February 25, 1993 | Brisbane, Queensland | | 2,200 | Jake Roberts vs. Jim Neidhart | |
| 5. | WSW | International Assault Tour (Day 2); October 7, 2005 | Sydney, New South Wales | | 2,100 | Rhino (c) vs. Jeff Jarrett for the WSW Heavyweight Championship | |
| 6. | AWF | Wrestleriot 2 June 26, 1993 | Adelaide, South Australia | | 1,450 | Big Bossman vs. Nailz | |
| 7. | WSW | International Assault Tour (Day 3); October 8, 2005 | Newcastle, New South Wales | | 1,200+ (Note: There are different reports on the attendance of the event with numbers ranging from 1,200 to 2,000.) | Rhino (c) vs. Jeff Jarrett for the WSW Heavyweight Championship | |
| 8. | AAP / HOH | HoH 28; June 17, 2017 | Sydney, New South Wales | Sydney Showground | 1,200 | Tommy Dreamer and Billy Gunn vs. The Young Bucks (Matt Jackson & Nick Jackson) | |
| 8. | MCW | MCW 100; August 18, 2018 | Albert Park, Victoria | Melbourne Sports & Aquatic Centre | 1,200 | Slex (c) vs. Will Ospreay for the MCW Intercommonwealth Championship | |
| 9. | OCW / HOH | HOH 15; June 24, 2016 | Burwood East, Victoria | Whitehorse Club | 1,100 | Andy Phoenix vs. KrackerJak vs. Carlito vs. Tommy Dreamer in a Number 1 contenders Fatal 4-Way match for the OCW Heavyweight Championship | |
| 9. | AAP / HOH | HOH 30; June 23, 2017 | Burwood East, Victoria | Whitehorse Club | 1,100 | MVP vs. Jack Swagger vs. Tommy Dreamer in a Three-Way Dance | |
| 10. | AWF | Wrestleriot; March 2, 1993 | Adelaide, South Australia | | 1,000 | Jake Roberts vs. Jim Neidhart | |
| 10. | HRCW | Nailz vs. High Risk Warrior; July 23, 1999 | Adelaide, South Australia | | 1,000 | Nailz vs. High Risk Warrior | |
| 10. | AWF | Psycho Slam Tour (Day 4); August 30, 1999 | Melbourne, Victoria | Camberwell Civic Centre | 1,000 | Sabu vs. Chris Candido | |
| 10. | AWF | Supanova Sidney (Day 1); June 27, 2009 | Sydney, New South Wales | Sydney SuperDome | 1,000 | Spaceboy Dacey vs. Zander Bathory | |

=== Mexico ===
Mexican professional wrestling has many more independent wrestlers in proportion to the rest of North America, because of the weight classes prevalent in the Mexican league system as well as its emphasis on multiple person tag matches; just about anyone with ability can emerge from an independent lucha libre promotion into either AAA or Consejo Mundial de Lucha Libre and be a champion there. Independent Mexican wrestlers may use a lot of gimmicks, including some that may be based on copyrighted characters from American television shows, such as Thundercats and X-Men. (These gimmicks are often changed if the wrestler playing them makes it into AAA or CMLL; the most prominent example of non-compliance with this method is midget wrestler Chucky from AAA, whose gimmick is based on the Child's Play movies.)

Top 10 most-attended shows
| No. | Promoter | Event | Location | Venue | Attendance | Main Event(s) | Ref |
|---|---|---|---|---|---|---|---|
| 1. | Toryumon Mexico | DragonMania III; May 11, 2008 | Mexico City, Mexico | Arena Mexico | 17,000 | Ultimo Dragon, Mistico and Tatsumi Fujinami vs. Ultimo Guerrero, Atlantis and Rene Dupree | |
| 2. | Toryumon Mexico | DragonMania II; May 13, 2007 | Mexico City, Mexico | Arena Mexico | 16,800 | Último Dragón, Mil Máscaras, Marco Corleone, and Kazuchika Okada vs. Yoshihiro Takayama, Minoru Suzuki, Último Guerrero and SUWA | |
| 3. | LLE | ALL Elite; February 8, 2015 | Mexico City, Mexico | Arena Mexico | 15,000 | Dr. Wagner Jr. and La Sombra vs. L.A. Par-K and Volador Jr. | |
| 4. | TXT | Torneo Todo X El Todo; December 8, 2007 | Naucalpan, Mexico | El Toreo de Cuatro Caminos | 12,000 | 16-man Torneo Todo X El Todo tournament | |
| 4. | Toryumon Mexico | DragonMania VIII; June 15, 2013 | Mexico City, Mexico | Arena Mexico | 12,000 | Último Dragón, Atlantis and Rayo de Jalisco Jr. vs. Último Guerrero, Hajime Ohara and Mike Knox | |
| 4. | LLE | December 20, 2015 | Mexico City, Mexico | Arena Mexico | 12,000 | Rayo de Jalisco Jr., Octagón and Atlantis vs. Los Hermanos Dinamita (Universo Dos Mil, Cien Caras, Máscara Año Dos Mil) | |
| 5. | — | Lucha de Leyendas; June 23, 2013 | Mérida, Mexico | El Poliforo Zamná | 11,500 | El Hijo del Santo vs. Blue Demon Jr. | |
| 6. | LL-VIP | July 5, 2008 | Monterrey, Nuevo Leon | La Arena Monterrey | 10,500+ (Note: There are different reports on the attendance of the event with numbers ranging from 10,500 to 11,000.) | Atlantis vs. Blue Panther vs. Místico vs. Último Guerrero vs. Villano V vs. Tigre Universitario in a 6-way Mask vs. Mask match | |
| 7. | Toryumon Mexico | DragonMania V May 29, 2010 | Mexico City, Mexico | Arena Mexico | 10,000+ (Note: There are different reports on the attendance of the event with numbers ranging from 10,000 to 13,000.) | Mil Máscaras, Tatsumi Fujinami, Último Dragón and Brazo de Plata vs. Rey Bucanero, Chuck Palumbo, Atlantis and Arkángel de la Muerte | |
| 8. | Toryumon Mexico | DragonMania XI; May 28, 2016 | Mexico City, Mexico | Arena Mexico | 10,000 (Note: Event is described as "heavily papered".) | Ultimo Dragon, Octagon and Caristico vs. Fuerza Guerrera, Tiger Ali and Mephisto | |
| 9. | Toryumon Mexico | DragonManía; May 14, 2005 | Mexico City, Mexico | Arena Mexico | 9,914 | Último Dragón, Rayo de Jalisco Jr. and Tigre Enmascarado vs. Los Guerreros del Infierno (Rey Bucanero, Tarzan Boy and Último Guerrero) | |
| 10. | The Crash | The Crash in San Luis Potosí; August 10, 2017 | San Luis Potosí City, San Luis Potosí | El Domo de San Luis | 9,000 | Rey Misterio Jr., Blue Demon Jr. and Rey Fénix vs. La Máscara, M-ximo and Rey Escorpión | |

=== Japan ===
Until 1984, no independent puroresu promotion per se existed in Japan; potential talent went directly into the training dojos of either New Japan Pro-Wrestling or All Japan Pro Wrestling. (International Wrestling Enterprise also was a third-party promotion until 1981.) The advent of the Japanese Universal Wrestling Federation offered a long-sought third alternative.

From 1986 to 1988 the Japanese system went back to the two-promotion system, but then the UWF was reformed and another promotion, Pioneer Senshi, was started. Because of Japanese societal mores which implied that a wrestler was a lifelong employee of a company and thus identified with it wherever he went, neither AJPW nor NJPW made an effort to acquire wrestlers trained in other promotions; wrestlers from the major promotions who left, such as Genichiro Tenryu, Gran Hamada, Yoshiaki Fujiwara, Akira Maeda, Atsushi Onita, and Nobuhiko Takada had to start their own independent promotions in order to keep themselves in the limelight (Wrestling Association "R", Universal Lucha Libre, Pro Wrestling Fujiwara Gumi, Fighting Network Rings, Frontier Martial-Arts Wrestling, and Hustle respectively) .

As the 1990s ended, though, things began to change. Independent promotions began gaining more prominence as they were featured in major specialized media such as Shukan Puroresu and Shukan Gong magazines. With the death of Giant Baba and retirement of Antonio Inoki, which effectively broke their control over the promotions they founded, the major promotions began looking to the smaller promotions for talent.

In 2000, the first major signing from an independent, Minoru Tanaka by NJPW from BattlARTS, took place; soon after NJPW stocked the junior heavyweight division with independent talent such as Masayuki Naruse, Tiger Mask, Gedo, and Jado. On the same year, following the Pro Wrestling Noah split, AJPW was forced to fill its ranks with independent talent; Nobutaka Araya, Shigeo Okumura and Mitsuya Nagai signed up (Araya is the only one who remains, but other signings since then have been Kaz Hayashi, Tomoaki Honma, Hideki Hosaka, and Ryuji Hijikata.)

Noah admitted one wrestler from the independents, Daisuke Ikeda, to its ranks as well (Ikeda has since left, but other wrestlers from the independents that were signed included Akitoshi Saito, Takahiro Suwa, and Taiji Ishimori). Although AJPW, NJPW, and Noah remain committed to their dojos, the reliance on independents is growing as obscure talent is recognized for its ability.

Top 10 most-attended shows
| No. | Promoter | Event | Location | Venue | Attendance | Main Event(s) | Ref |
|---|---|---|---|---|---|---|---|
| — | TPW | Tokyo Pro Wrestling in Atami; July 23, 1996 | Atami, Shizuoka | Sun Beach | 65,000 | Abdullah the Butcher and Daikokubo Benkei vs. Kishin Kawabata and Takashi Ishikawa | |
| 1. | FMW | FMW 6th Anniversary Show; May 5, 1995 | Kawasaki, Kanagawa | Kawasaki Stadium | 58,250 | Atsushi Onita (c) vs. Hayabusa in a No Rope Exploding Barbed Wire Deathmatch for the FMW Brass Knuckles Heavyweight Championship | |
| 2. | FMW | FMW 5th Anniversary Show; May 5, 1994 | Kawasaki, Kanagawa | Kawasaki Stadium | 52,000 | Atsushi Onita vs. Genichiro Tenryu in a No Rope Exploding Barbed Wire Deathmatch | |
| 3. | FMW | Barbed Wire Deathmatch Tournament; August 17, 1991 | Tokyo, Japan | Torisu Stadium | 48,221 | Atsushi Onita vs. Sambo Asako in a no rope barbed wire death match tournament final | |
| 4. | UWFi | UWFi Pro Wrestling World Championship: Takada vs. Vader; December 5, 1993 | Tokyo, Japan | Meiji Jingu Stadium | 46,168 | Nobuhiko Takada (c) vs. Super Vader for the UWFI World Heavyweight Championship | |
| 5. | AJW | Super Woman Great War: Big Egg Wrestling Universe; November 20, 1994 | Tokyo, Japan | Tokyo Dome | 42,500 | Akira Hokuto vs. Aja Kong in the V*TOP Woman Tournament final | |
| 6. | FMW | FMW 4th Anniversary Show; May 5, 1993 | Kawasaki, Kanagawa | Kawasaki Stadium | 41,000 | Atsushi Onita vs. Terry Funk in a No Ropes Exploding Barbed Wire Timebomb Death match | |
| 7. | PWFG | Tokyo Dome Show; October 4, 1992 | Tokyo, Japan | Tokyo Dome | 40,800 | Masakatsu Funaki vs. Maurice Smith | |
| 8. | SWS / WWF | SuperWrestle; December 12, 1991 | Tokyo, Japan | Tokyo Dome | 40,000 | Genichiro Tenryu vs. Hulk Hogan | |
| 8. | MPW | Sendai Television Broadcasting Festival: Happy!! Juni*Land (Day 2); November 5, 2006 | Sendai, Miyagi | Sendai West Park Open Space | 40,000 | Jinsei Shinzaki and Shinjitsu Nohashi vs. Yoshitsune and Rasse | |
| 9. | MPW | Sendai Television Broadcasting Festival: Happy!! Juni*Land (Day 1); November 4, 2006 | Sendai, Miyagi | Sendai West Park Open Space | 37,500 | Jinsei Shinzaki and Shinjitsu Nohashi vs. The Great Sasuke and Yoshitsune | |
| 10. | FMW | Summer Spectacular; August 22, 1993 | Nishinomiya, Hyogo | Hankyu Nishinomiya Stadium | 36,223 | Atsushi Onita vs. Mr. Pogo in a No Ropes Barbed Wire Exploding Cage Deathmatch for the FMW Brass Knuckles Heavyweight Championship | |

=== United Kingdom ===
For most of the years of ITV's coverage of British Wrestling, the dominant promoter in the United Kingdom was the Joint Promotions cartel, which was originally modelled on the NWA and later amalgamated into a single company. Nonetheless, throughout this period, untelevised alternative promotions flourished with at least one significant competitor to Joint for live shows.

Initially the main rival was the former dominant promotion in the territory, Atholl Oakley's BWA. By the time of its demise, wrestler/promoter Paul Lincoln had established himself as a major promoter with shows featuring himself as headline heel. In 1958, when Bert Assirati was stripped of the British Heavyweight Championship, Lincoln formed the BWF alliance of promoters to support Assirati's claim, later recognising Shirley Crabtree as champion. Lincoln's BWF was eventually bought out into Joint in 1970.

Welsh promoter Orig Williams also used the BWF name, promoting from the late 1960s up until the early 2000s and then sporadically until his death in 2009. From 1982 to 1995, Williams had a Welsh language TV wrestling show "Reslo" on S4C. Brian Dixon, a referee for Williams, set up his own company Wrestling Enterprises of Birkenhead later renamed All Star Wrestling c. 1984. An alliance with promoter and former top star Jackie Pallo failed to prevent Joint gaining a five-year extension on its TV wrestling monopoly from January 1982 to December 1986.

However, by the mid-1980s Dixon had won over many wrestlers and fans from Joint who were tired of the Big Daddy-orientated direction of Joint. Eventually this culminated in All Star gaining a TV show on satellite channel Screensport and later, a slice of ITV's coverage from 1987 until the end of ITV wrestling in 1988. By the end of this period, All Star had effectively replaced Joint (by now owned by Max Crabtree, brother of Shirley) as the dominant promotion in the UK.

Joint, renamed Ring Wrestling Stars in 1991, dwindled down before closing with Crabtree's retirement in 1995, All Star has continued to be the dominant non-import live promotion in the UK up to the present day. Its principal competitors since that time have been Scott Conway's TWA, John Freemantle's Premier Promotions, RBW and LDN Wrestling. Since the 1990s there have also been numerous American-style "New School" promotions.

Top 10 most-attended shows
| No. | Promoter | Event | Location | Venue | Attendance | Main Event(s) | Ref |
|---|---|---|---|---|---|---|---|
| 1. | ICW | Fear & Loathing IX; November 20, 2016 | Glasgow, Scotland | The SSE Hydro | 6,193 | Joe Coffey vs. Kurt Angle | |
| 2. | PROGRESS | PROGRESS Chapter 76: Hello Wembley! September 30, 2018 | London, England | SSE Wembley Arena | 4,750 | WALTER (c) vs. Tyler Bate for the PROGRESS World Championship | |
| 3. | ICW | Fear & Loathing X November 19, 2017 | Glasgow, Scotland | The SSE Hydro | 4,500 | Joe Coffey (c-WHC) vs. BT Gunn (c-ZGC) in a Champion vs. Champion match for the ICW World Heavyweight Championship and ICW Zero G Championship | |
| 4. | RevPro | RevPro 11th Anniversary Show; August 26, 2023 | London, England | Copper Box Arena | 4,072 | Will Ospreay vs. Shingo Takagi | |
| 5. | PCW | Tribute to the Troops; June 28, 2014 | Preston, England | Harris Flights | 4,000 | Joey Hayes (c) vs. Carlito for the PCW Heavyweight Championship | |
| 5. | ICW | Fear & Loathing VIII; November 15, 2015 | Glasgow, Scotland | Scottish Exhibition and Conference Centre | 4,000 | Drew Galloway (c) vs. Grado for the ICW World Heavyweight Championship | |
| 6. | TWC / FWA | International Showdown; March 19, 2005 | Coventry, England | Coventry Skydome | 3,400 | Christopher Daniels (c) vs. AJ Styles for the TNA X-Division Championship | |
| 7. | RevPro / NJPW | Strong Style Evolved UK (Day 2); July 1, 2008 | Manchester, England | Silver Blades Altrincham | 3,000 | Tomohiro Ishii (c) vs. Minoru Suzuki for the RevPro Undisputed British Heavyweight Championship | |
| 8. | RevPro / NJPW | Strong Style Evolved UK (Day 1); June 30, 2018 | Milton Keynes, England | Planet Ice Milton Keynes | 2,546 | Suzuki-gun (Minoru Suzuki and Zack Sabre Jr.) (c) vs. CHAOS (Kazuchika Okada and Tomohiro Ishii) for the RevPro Undisputed British Tag Team Championship | |
| 9. | WCPW | True Legacy; October 8, 2016 | Manchester, England | Silver Blades Altrincham | 2,500+ (Note: There are different reports on the attendance of True Legacy with numbers ranging from 2,500 to 2,600.) | Kurt Angle vs. Cody Rhodes | |
| 10. | PROGRESS | PROGRESS Chapter 36: We're Gonna Need A Bigger Room... Again; September 25, 2016 | London, England | O2 Academy Brixton | 2,400 | Marty Scurll (c) vs. Mark Haskins vs. Tommy End in a Three-Way Dance for the PROGRESS World Championship | |

== Attendance records ==
Note: Minimum attendance of 5,000.

- Light Grey indicates event was a free show and/or held at a major public gathering.

| Promotion | Event | Location | Venue | Attendance | Main Event(s) | Ref |
|---|---|---|---|---|---|---|
| NWA-NE | WRKO's Taste of the Boss; September 25, 1999 | Boston, Massachusetts, United States | Boston City Hall Plaza | 35,000 | 5-0 (Trooper Gilmore and Corporal Johnson) vs. Victor Rivera and Jay Kobain | |
| Lutte 2000 | Alouettes Mania I August 25, 2002 | Montreal, Quebec, Canada | Stade Percival-Molson | 20,000 | Jacques Rougeau vs. King Kong Bundy | |
| LF | Alouettes Mania III; July 15, 2004 | Montreal, Quebec, Canada | Stade Percival-Molson | 20,000 | Jacques Rougeau vs. Kamala | |
| LF | Alouettes Mania IV; July 8, 2005 | Montreal, Quebec, Canada | Stade Percival-Molson | 20,000 | Jim Duggan vs. Kurrgan with special referee Jacques Rougeau | |
| IWR | Warped Tour 2002; August 3, 2003 | Pontiac, Michigan, United States | Pontiac Silverdome | 19,000 | Deranged vs. Tommy Starr in a UV Light Tube Death match | |
| — | Final Slam; November 14, 2026 | Nanterre, France | Plenitude Arena | 18,000 | Amine vs. Squeezie | |
| BELIEVE | BELIEVE 156; April 21, 2018 | Orlando, Florida | Central Florida Fairgrounds | 15,000 | Aaron Epic (c) vs. Andrew Merlin for the SCW Florida Heavyweight Championship | |
| AWF | Cement Belt Fair; June 21, 1990 | Cementon, Pennsylvania, United States | Cementon Fairgrounds | 12,500 | Heidi Lee Morgan vs. Baby Face Nellie | |
| WPW | OC Fair: Flower Power (Day 2); July 23, 2006 | Costa Mesa, California, United States | Washington Mutual Arena | 12,000 | El Hijo del Santo, Lil Cholo and Silver Tyger vs. Infernal, Super Kendo 2 and Super Parka | |
| — | All In; September 1, 2018 | Hoffman Estates, Illinois, United States | Sears Centre Arena | 11,263 | The Golden Elite (Kota Ibushi, Matt Jackson and Nick Jackson) vs. Bandido, Rey Fénix and Rey Mysterio in a six-man tag team match | |
| BBWF | Caribbean Wrestling Bash: The Legends Tour; September 9, 2012 | San Nicolas, Aruba | Joe Laveist Ballpark | 11,000 | Scott Steiner vs. Billy Gunn for the Aruba Wrestling Bash Championship | |
| WWN | WWNLive in China (Day 4); November 16, 2014 | Beijing, China | Cadillac Arena | 10,500 | Ricochet (c) vs. Johnny Gargano for the Open the Freedom Gate Championship | |
| WPW | OC Fair: Flower Power (Day 1); July 22, 2006 | Costa Mesa, California, United States | Washington Mutual Arena | 10,000 | El Hijo del Santo, Lil Cholo and Silver Tyger vs. Infernal, Super Kendo 2 and Super Parka | |
| BBWF | Caribbean Wrestling Bash: The Legends Tour; September 8, 2012 | San Nicolas, Aruba | Joe Laveist Ballpark | 9,000 | Scott Steiner vs. Kevin Nash | |
| HWA | BaseBrawl; July 19, 2003 | Columbus, Ohio, United States | Cooper Stadium | 8,757 | Rory Fox (c) vs. Shark Boy for the HWA Cruiserweight Championship | |
| USWA | Memphis Memories, United States; March 7, 1994 | Memphis, Tennessee | Mid-South Coliseum | 8,377 | Jerry Lawler vs. Austin Idol vs. Brian Christopher vs. Doug Gilbert vs. Eddie Gilbert vs. Jimmy Valiant vs. Koko B. Ware vs. Moondog Spot vs. Terry Funk vs. Tommy Rich in a 10-man elimination match | |
| WXW | Sportsfest; July 12, 1998 | Allentown, Pennsylvania, United States | Cedar Beach Park | 8,000 | The Love Connection (Jay Love and Georgie Love) vs. D'Lo Brown and Owen Hart | |
| USWA / WWF | USWA vs. WWF; February 17, 1996 | Memphis, Tennessee | Mid-South Coliseum | 7,500 | Bret Hart (c) vs. Jerry Lawler in a Steel Cage match for the WWF World Heavyweight Championship | |
| FMLL | LuchaMania USA Tour; January 26, 2013 | Los Angeles, California, United States | Los Angeles Memorial Sports Arena | 7,000 | Blue Demon Jr., Cien Caras Jr. and Dr. Wagner Jr. vs. El Hijo del Santo, L.A. Par-K and Rayo de Jalisco Jr. in a six-man tag team match | |
| JCP | Ric Flair's Last Match; July 31, 2022 | Nashville, Tennessee, United States | Nashville Municipal Auditorium | 6,800 | Ric Flair and Andrade El Idolo vs. Jay Lethal and Jeff Jarrett | |
| FMW / WWA | FMW vs. WWA; May 16, 1992 | Los Angeles, California, United States | Cal State-Los Angeles Gym | 6,250 | Atsushi Onita, Tarzan Goto and El Hijo del Santo vs. Negro Casas, Horace Boulder and Tim Patterson in a Best 2-out-of-3 Falls Street Fight match | |
| IWC | Big Butler Fair; June 28, 2003 | Prospect, Pennsylvania, United States | Big Butler Fairgrounds | 6,000 | Dusty Rhodes vs. Jerry Lawler | |
| Multiple | World Wrestling Peace Festival; June 1, 1996 | Los Angeles, California, United States | Los Angeles Sports Arena | 5,964 | Antonio Inoki and Dan Severn vs. Yoshiaki Fujiwara and Oleg Taktarov | |
| ECW | November to Remember; November 1, 1998 | New Orleans, Louisiana, United States | Lakefront Arena | 5,800 | The Triple Threat (Shane Douglas, Bam Bam Bigelow and Chris Candido) vs. New Triple Threat (Sabu, Rob Van Dam and Taz) | |
| JCW | Bloodymania; August 11, 2007 | Cave-In-Rock, Illinois, United States | Hogrock Ranch & Campground | 5,800 | Sabu and The Insane Clown Posse (Shaggy 2 Dope and Violent J) vs. Trent Acid and The Young Altar Boys (Young Altar Boy #1 and Young Altar Boy #4) | |
| Lutte 2000 | Pierre Carl Ouellet vs. Kurrgan; December 30, 2001 | Montreal, Quebec, Canada | Centre Bell | 5,500+ | Pierre Carl Ouellet vs. Kurrgan with special referee Sid Vicious | |
| FCW | Pride; September 24, 2005 | Inglewood, California, United States | Great Western Forum | 5,500 | Blue Demon Jr., El Hijo del Santo, Mil Mascaras and Tinieblas vs. Dr. Wagner Jr., Scorpio Jr. and Los Guerreros del Infierno (Rey Bucanero and Ultimo Guerrero) | |
| — | Funk Free for All; October 28, 1993 | Amarillo, Texas, United States | Amarillo Civic Center | 5,500 | Terry Funk vs. Eddie Gilbert in a Texas Death match | |
| WWWoW | Cleveland County Fair; October 1, 1992 | Shelby, North Carolina, United States | Cleveland County Fairgrounds | 5,200 | 9-man battle royal | |
| NWA-OVW | Christmas Chaos; January 31, 2001 | Louisville, Kentucky, United States | Louisville Gardens | 5,010 | Leviathan vs. Kane | |
| USWA | Challenge for the Championship; October 8, 1990 | Memphis, Tennessee, United States | Mid-South Coliseum | 5,000 | 20-man tournament for the vacant USWA World Heavyweight Championship | |
| SMW | Night of Legends; August 5, 1994 | Knoxville, Tennessee, United States | Knoxville Civic Coliseum | 5,000 | Bob Armstrong, Tracy Smothers and Road Warrior Hawk vs. Bruiser Bedlam and The Funk Brothers (Dory Funk Jr. and Terry Funk) | |
| SMW | Superbowl of Wrestling; August 4, 1995 | Knoxville, Tennessee, United States | Knoxville Civic Coliseum | 5,000 | Shawn Michaels vs. Buddy Landel for the WWF Intercontinental Championship | |
| NEPW | Lake County Fair; August 24, 2002 | Painesville, Ohio, United States | Lake County Fairgrounds | 5,000 | Julio Dinero vs. Dick Trimmins | |
| WXW | Sportsfest; July 9, 2004 | Allentown, Pennsylvania, United States | Cedar Beach Park | 5,000 | Rapid Fire Maldonado (c) vs. Mana the Polynesian Warrior for the WXW Heavyweight Championship | |
| MW | Throwback Night II; August 28, 2004 | Memphis, Tennessee, United States | Mid-South Coliseum | 5,000 | Terry Funk and Corey Maclin vs. Jerry Lawler and Jimmy Hart with special referee Jimmy Valiant | |
| ASW | DukesFest 2007; June 12, 2007 | Nashville, Tennessee, United States | Music City Motorplex | 5,000 | Iron Cross, Bobby Houston and Jerry Lawler vs. Stan Lee, Eddie Golden and K.C. Thunder | |

=== Historical ===
Top 10 most-attended shows in the 1990s
| No. | Promoter | Event | Location | Venue | Attendance | Main Event(s) | Ref |
|---|---|---|---|---|---|---|---|
| 1. | WXW | Sportsfest; July 12, 1998 | Allentown, Pennsylvania, United States | Cedar Beach Park | 8,000 | The Love Connection (Jay Love and Georgie Love) vs. D'Lo Brown and Owen Hart | |
| 2. | FMW / WWA | FMW vs. WWA; May 16, 1992 | Los Angeles, California, United States | California State University | 6,250 | Atsushi Onita, Tarzan Goto and El Hijo del Santo vs. Negro Casas, Horace Boulder and Tim Patterson in a Best 2-out-of-3 Falls Street Fight match | |
| 3. | ECW | Anarchy Rulz; September 19, 1999 | Villa Park, Illinois, United States | Odeum Expo Center | 6,000 | Rob Van Dam (c) vs. Balls Mahoney for the ECW World Television Championship | |
| 4. | Multiple | World Wrestling Peace Festival; June 1, 1996 | Los Angeles, California, United States | Los Angeles Sports Arena | 5,964 | Antonio Inoki and Dan Severn vs. Yoshiaki Fujiwara and Oleg Taktarov | |
| 5. | ECW | November to Remember; November 1, 1998 | New Orleans, Louisiana, United States | Lakefront Arena | 5,800 | The Triple Threat (Shane Douglas, Bam Bam Bigelow and Chris Candido) vs. New Triple Threat (Sabu, Rob Van Dam and Taz) | |
| 6. | — | Funk Free for All; October 28, 1993 | Amarillo, Texas, United States | Amarillo Civic Center | 5,500 | Terry Funk vs. Eddie Gilbert in a Texas Death match | |
| 7. | WWWoW | October 1, 1992 | Shelby, North Carolina, United States | 9-Man Battle Royal | 5,200 | 9-man battle royal | |
| 8. | SMW | Night of Legends; August 5, 1994 | Knoxville, Tennessee, United States | Knoxville Civic Coliseum | 5,000 | Bob Armstrong, Tracy Smothers and Road Warrior Hawk vs. Bruiser Bedlam and The Funk Brothers (Dory Funk Jr. and Terry Funk) | |
| 8. | SMW | Superbowl of Wrestling; August 4, 1995 | Knoxville, Tennessee, United States | Knoxville Civic Coliseum | 5,000 | Shawn Michaels vs. Buddy Landel for the WWF Intercontinental Championship | |
| 9. | ECW | November to Remember; November 30, 1997 | Monaca, Pennsylvania, United States | Golden Dome | 4,634 | Bam Bam Bigelow (c) vs. Shane Douglas for the ECW World Heavyweight Championship | |
| 10. | PWF | Pro Wrestlemania II; December 10, 1993 | Charlotte, North Carolina, United States | Charlotte Coliseum | 4,500 | George South and Italian Stallion vs. Austin Steele and Black Scorpion | |

Top 10 most-attended shows in the 2000s
| No. | Promoter | Event | Location | Venue | Attendance | Main Event(s) |
|---|---|---|---|---|---|---|
| 1. | PMG | Clash of the Legends; April 27, 2004 | Memphis, Tennessee, United States | FedEx Forum | 6,000? | Hulk Hogan vs. Paul Wight |
| 2. | ECW | Heat Wave; July 16, 2000 | Los Angeles, California, United States | Grand Olympic Auditorium | 5,700 | Justin Credible (c) vs. Tommy Dreamer in a Stairway to Hell match for the ECW World Heavyweight Championship |
| 3. | NWA | NWA New Jersey vs. NWA Pro; June 27, 2009 | Newark, New Jersey, United States | JFK Recreation Center | 5,500 | Apollo (c) vs. Dimitrios Papadon for the NWA North American Heavyweight Championship |
| 4. | NEPW | NEPW at the Lake County Fairgrounds; August 24, 2002 | Painesville, Ohio, United States | Lake County Fairgrounds | 5,000 | Julio Dinero vs. Dick Trimmins |
| 4. | WXW | Sportsfest; July 9, 2004 | Allentown, Pennsylvania, United States | Cedar Beach Park | 5,000 | Rapid Fire Maldonado (c) vs. Mana the Polynesian Warrior for the WXW Heavyweight Championship |
| 4. | MW | Throwback Night II; August 28, 2004 | Memphis, Tennessee, United States | Mid-South Coliseum | 5,000 | Terry Funk and Corey Maclin vs. Jerry Lawler and Jimmy Hart with Jimmy Valiant as special referee |
| 4. | ASW | Dukes of Hazzard Festival; June 12, 2007 | Nashville, Tennessee, United States | Music City Motorplex | 5,000 | Iron Cross, Bobby Houston and Jerry Lawler vs. Stan Lee, Eddie Golden and K.C. Thunder |
| 5. | ECW | Guilty as Charged; January 9, 2000 | Birmingham, Alabama, United States | Boutwell Memorial Auditorium | 4,700 | Mike Awesome vs. Spike Dudley for the ECW World Heavyweight Championship |
| 5. | — | Clash of the Legends; June 15, 2001 | Memphis, Tennessee, United States | Mid-South Coliseum | 4,700 | Jerry Lawler vs. Lord Humongous with Lance Russell as special referee |
| 6. | ECW | Anarchy Rulz; October 1, 2000 | Saint Paul, Minnesota, United States | Roy Wilkins Auditorium | 4,600 | Justin Credible (c) vs. Jerry Lynn for the ECW World Heavyweight Championship |
| 6. | ECW | November to Remember; November 5, 2000 | Villa Park, Illinois, United States | Odeum Expo Center | 4,600 | Jerry Lynn (c) vs. Steve Corino vs. Justin Credible vs. The Sandman and in a Double Jeopardy match for the ECW World Heavyweight Championship |
| 7. | MW | Throwback Night; July 10, 2004 | Memphis, Tennessee, United States | Mid-South Coliseum | 3,758 | Jerry Lawler and Jimmy Hart vs. Corey Maclin and Kamala |
| 8. | ECW | ECW on TNN; April 8, 2000 | Buffalo, New York, United States | Flickinger Center | 3,700 | Super Crazy (c) vs. Yoshihiro Tajiri and Little Guido in a 3-Way Dance match for the ECW World Television Championship |
| 9. | ECW | ECW on TNN; June 24, 2000 | Villa Park, Illinois, United States | Odeum Sports & Expo Center | 3,500 | Justin Credible (c) vs. The Sandman for the ECW World Heavyweight Championship |
| 9. | MW | Throwback Night III: A Nightmare in Memphis; October 30, 2004 | Memphis, Tennessee, United States | Mid-South Coliseum | 3,500 | Jerry Lawler and The Rock 'n' Roll Express (Ricky Morton and Robert Gibson) vs. Corey Maclin, Stan Lane and Jackie Fargo |
| 10. | ECW | Hardcore Heaven; May 14, 2000 | Milwaukee, Wisconsin, United States | The Rave | 3,400 | Justin Credible (c) vs. Lance Storm and Tommy Dreamer in a 3-Way Dance match for the ECW World Heavyweight Championship |

Top 10 most-attended shows in the 2010s
| No. | Promoter | Event | Location | Venue | Attendance | Main Event(s) |
|---|---|---|---|---|---|---|
| 1. | — | All In; September 1, 2018 | Hoffman Estates, Illinois, United States | Sears Centre Arena | 11,263 | The Golden Elite (Kota Ibushi, Matt Jackson and Nick Jackson) vs. Bandido, Rey Fénix and Rey Mysterio in a six-man tag team match |
| 2. | FMLL | Luchamania USA; January 26, 2013 | Los Angeles, California | Los Angeles Memorial Sports Arena | 7,000 | Blue Demon Jr., Cien Caras Jr. and Dr. Wagner Jr. vs. El Hijo del Santo, L.A. Par-K and Rayo de Jalisco Jr. in a six-man tag team match |
| 3. | JCW | Take Me Home Charity Show; February 21, 2015 | Detroit, Michigan | Detroit Masonic Temple | 4,500 | 2 Tuff Tony (c) vs. The Weedman for the JCW Heavyweight Championship |
| 4. | JCW | Hatchet Attacks; March 26, 2011 | Milwaukee, Wisconsin, United States | The Rave | 4,311 | Corporal Robinson (c) vs. Ian Rotten in a Barbed Wire, Tables, Ladders & Glass match for the JCW Heavyweight Championship |
| 5. | WCE | WrestleCade 5: The Final 3 Count; November 26, 2016 | Winston-Salem, North Carolina, United States | Benton Convention Center | 4,000 | Matt Hardy (c) vs. Ryback for the WrestleCade Championship |
| 6. | NEW | Six Flags Slam Fest; June 15, 2019 | Jackson, New Jersey | Six Flags Great Adventure Theme Park | 3,700 | Jon Moxley vs. Caz XL |
| 7. | CWI | Brawl at the Bush II; May 14, 2011 | Brantford, Ontario | Brantford Civic Center | 3,600 | Haven, Lanny Poffo, Brutus Beefcake and Bushwhacker Luke vs. Big Daddy Hammer, Virgil and The Nasty Boys (Brian Knobbs and Jerry Sags) in a Survivor Series elimination match |
| 8. | — | February 17, 2013 | Chicago, Illinois | Congress Theatre | 3,500 | Blue Demon Jr., Imágen Nocturna and Piloto Suicida vs. L.A. Par-K, El Hijo del Santo and Rayo de Jalisco Jr. |
| 8. | LU | Austin Warfare; March 15, 2016 | Austin, Texas | Austin Music Hall | 3,500 | Cage, Prince Puma and Rey Mysterio Jr. vs. Jack Evans, Johnny Mundo and PJ Black |
| 8. | ROH | Supercard of Honor XI; April 1, 2017 | Lakeland, Florida | Lakeland Center | 3,500 | Christopher Daniels (c) vs. Dalton Castle for the ROH World Championship |
| 9. | NEW | Wrestling under the Stars (Day 1); August 1, 2015 | Wappingers Falls, New York | Dutchess Stadium | 3,341 | Rey Mysterio Jr. and Alberto El Patrón vs. The Young Bucks (Matt Jackson and Nick Jackson) |
| 10. | NEW | Wrestlefest; March 3, 2017 | Waterbury, Connecticut | Crosby High School | 3,300 | Kurt Angle vs. Cody Rhodes in a Steel Cage match |

== See also ==
- List of professional wrestling terms
- List of professional wrestling memorial shows
