= Atsushi Onita =

Japanese professional wrestler (born 1957)

- 大仁 田厚
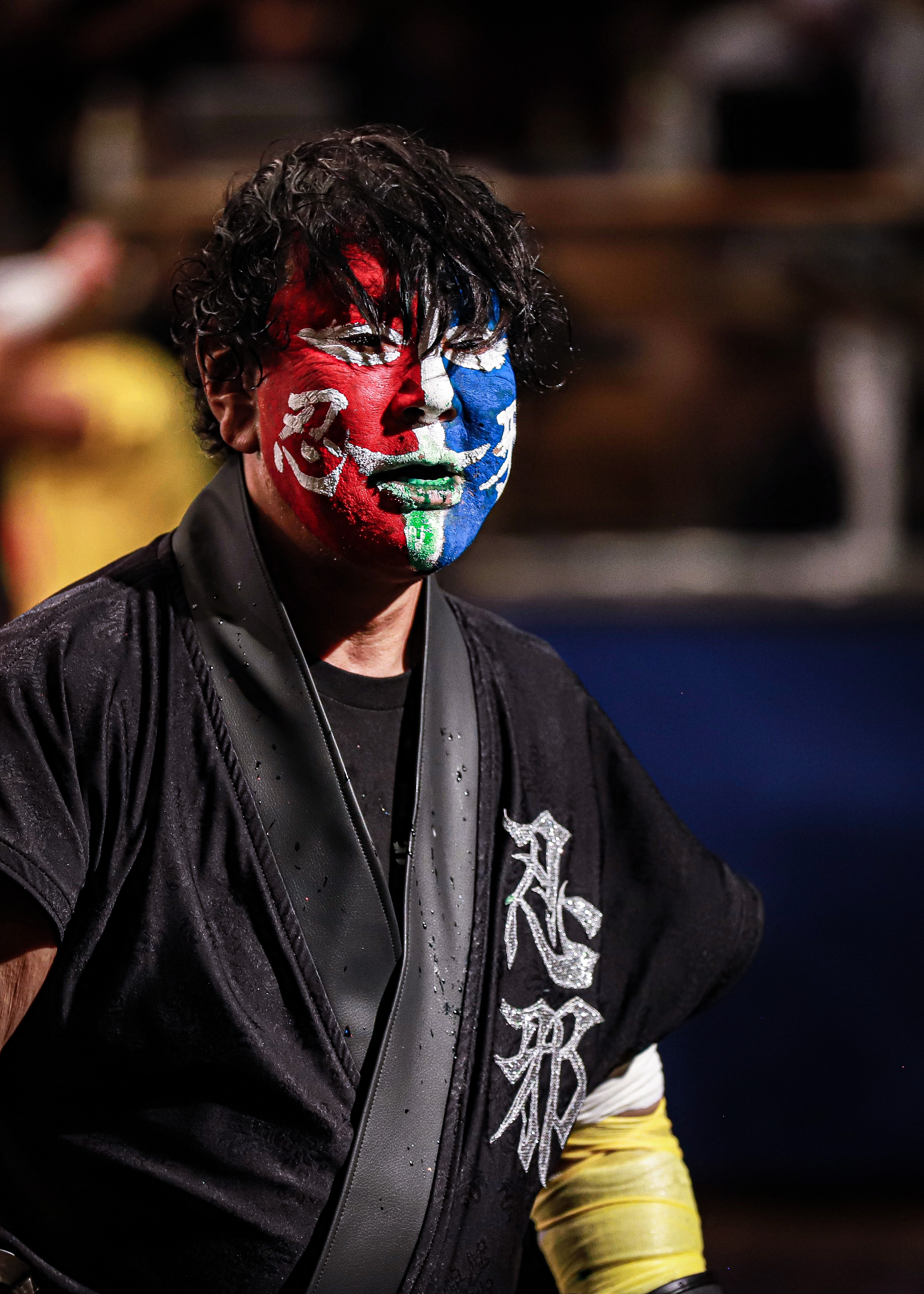
- Onita (as the Great Nita) in August 2023

Member of the House of Councillors
- In office 29 July 2001 – 28 July 2007
- Constituency: National PR

Personal details
- Born: 25 October 1957 (age 68) Nagasaki, Japan
- Party: Independent
- Other political affiliations: LDP (2001–2007)
- Education: Meiji University
- Professional wrestling career
- Ring name(s): Atsushi Onita; Mr. Onita; The Great Nita
- Billed height: 1.81 m (5 ft 11 in)
- Billed weight: 99 kg (218 lb)
- Trained by: Masio Koma; Giant Baba; Dick Beyer; Terry Funk
- Debut: April 14, 1974

Atsushi Onita (大仁田 厚, Ōnita Atsushi; born October 25, 1957) is a Japanese actor, politician, and semi-retired professional wrestler. He is best known for his work in Frontier Martial-Arts Wrestling (FMW) and is credited with introducing the deathmatch style of professional wrestling to Japan. He is a former 7-time FMW Brass Knuckles Heavyweight Champion and 3-time All Asia Tag Team Champion alongside partners Masanobu Fuchi, Yoshitatsu, and Toy Kojima.

Onita founded FMW in 1989, defeating martial artist Masashi Aoyagi under his own martial arts rules in the main event of the second night of the promotion's inaugural event. FMW later emerged as a full-fledged touring organization, moving away from martial arts-inspired shoot style matches and moving toward the rasslin'-inspired deathmatch style – which became popular with Japanese fans. He was the promotion's top star, wrestling in main event matches at sold-out events, making FMW a financially successful company, particularly for a Japanese independent promotion. Onita sold FMW to Shoichi Arai and retired from wrestling in 1995 to pursue an acting career, which was unsuccessful, forcing him to return as a wrestler in 1996. After returning to FMW, he led stables ZEN and Team Zero but departed the company in 1998 after disagreements over his position in the company.

He held the FMW Brass Knuckles Heavyweight Championship a record seven times and headlined the first six editions of FMW's premier Anniversary Show event from 1989 to 1995.

== Professional wrestling career ==
=== All Japan Pro Wrestling (1974–1985) ===
Onita was the first true graduate of the All Japan Pro Wrestling (AJPW) dojo (Jumbo Tsuruta had debuted first, but he had trained in Amarillo, Texas, with Dory Funk Jr. and Terry Funk), debuting on April 14, 1974. In his early days he teamed with dojo classmate Masanobu Fuchi, who debuted only a few weeks after him. He was known as a loyal ring attendant to AJPW promoter Giant Baba, who had accepted him into the dojo despite not having graduated from high school. In the late 1970s and the early 1980s, he and Fuchi toured Memphis, Tennessee, winning the AWA Southern Tag Team titles three times.

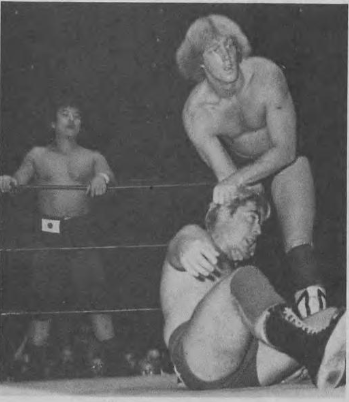
Onita (background) with David Von Erich (top) and Eric Embry during a 1981 match in Florida

When the junior heavyweight wrestling boom started in Japan, originally in New Japan Pro-Wrestling (NJPW) under Tatsumi Fujinami and the original Tiger Mask, Satoru Sayama, Onita was picked as the ace of AJPW's makeshift junior heavyweight division. Baba was able to get Chavo Guerrero, who had been an early rival of Fujinami, to jump over to AJPW's side, and Guerrero brought the NWA International Junior Heavyweight Championship with him, effectively establishing it as AJPW's junior heavyweight cornerstone. Onita and Guerrero's subsequent feud over the title spanned three promotions (AJPW, Jim Crockett Promotions, and Empresa Mexicana de Lucha Libre), and, while not as spectacular as NJPW's junior heavyweight division, provided a solid alternative to heavyweight-style wrestling for AJPW fans.

Onita took a hiatus from wrestling due to injury in April 1983. He attempted a comeback in May 1984. His last match prior to his retirement occurred on December 2, 1984, against Mighty Inoue. He would be replaced by his former tag team partner Masanobu Fuchi as the new junior heavyweight ace of AJPW. On January 3, 1985, Onita retired for the first time due to accumulated injuries.

=== Pioneer Senshi (1988) ===
After over three years recuperating from his injuries, Onita returned to the ring in December 1988 for Pioneer Senshi, an independent promotion, losing a martial arts–inspired bout to Ryuma Go.

=== Frontier Martial-Arts Wrestling (1989–1998) ===
==== Brass Knuckles Heavyweight Champion (1989–1993) ====
Following his return to the ring, Onita issued a challenge to the wrestlers of the shoot style promotion Universal Wrestling Federation (UWF) but his challenge was rejected and he responded by taking on martial artist Masashi Aoyagi in a (worked) martial arts fight for the World Karate Association (WKA) on July 2, 1989, during which Onita was disqualified for using wrestling moves on Aoyagi. In the aftermath of his fight for the WKA, Onita personally promoted two wrestling shows under the Frontier Martial-Arts Wrestling (FMW) banner titled Grudge in Nagoya and Grudge in Tokyo in October and headlined both shows against Aoyagi. He lost to Aoyagi at Grudge in Nagoya and defeated him at Grudge in Tokyo. Onita shortly after developed FMW into a full-time promotion, originally basing it around shoot style matches before transitioning the company into being Japan's first death match promotion – taking inspiration from the style of matches he had seen during his earlier stay in Memphis. Even as the deathmatch wrestling style become the main trademark of FMW, the promotion would continue to hold shoot style matches. Onita would bring in numerous karate and martial arts fighters to be part of the FMW roster in the early years of the promotion.

The first street fight of FMW took place on December 4, in which Onita and Dick Murdoch defeated Jos LeDuc and Masanobu Kurisu. Onita was featured as the company's main star and the top fan favorite and headlined every show. His first Barbed Wire Deathmatch took place at Battle Creation as he teamed with Tarzan Goto to defeat Jerry Blayman and Mitsuhiro Matsunaga. After being eliminated by his frequent ally Tarzan Goto from the Battle Resistance tournament, Onita defeated Beast the Barbarian to win the WWA World Brass Knuckles Heavyweight Championship for the first time on January 17, 1990.

Onita's first feud began in the summer of 1990 when Onita defeated Lee Gak-soo in a different style fight on May 19 and then the two showed respect to each other and teamed to defeat Mitsuteru Tokuda and Sambo Asako in a tag team match on June 2. Goto was irate at Onita for teaming with karate fighters and toning down professional wrestling and he brought in Mr. Pogo to FMW and Onita began feuding with Goto and Pogo. Onita defeated Goto in an empty arena match on June 24 and then successfully defended the Brass Knuckles Heavyweight Championship against Goto in the first-ever no ropes exploding barbed wire deathmatch at Summer Spectacular. After the match, Onita and Goto ended their feud by embracing each other and putting away their differences and then Onita began a legendary rivalry against Mr. Pogo, with Onita defeating Pogo in the first singles encounter in a street fight on August 25. Onita successfully defended the Brass Knuckles Heavyweight Championship against Pogo in a Texas Deathmatch at 1st Anniversary Show.

Onita lost the Brass Knuckles Heavyweight Championship to Grigory Verichev on February 27, 1991. Onita unsuccessfully challenged Verichev for the title in a rematch on May 5 and then received another title shot on May 29, where Onita defeated Verichev to regain the renamed World Martial Arts Heavyweight Championship. On August 17, Onita defeated Jimmy Backlund, Ricky Fuji and Sambo Asako to win the Barbed Wire Deathmatch Tournament. During this time, Mr. Pogo left FMW and Tarzan Goto turned on Onita once again to renew their feud and became Onita's arch rival. Onita defeated Goto in the first-ever no rope exploding barbed wire steel cage deathmatch at the very successful 2nd Anniversary Show on September 23 at the Kawasaki Stadium in Kawasaki, which would become the venue for FMW's major events in future.

Onita and Goto reunited once again and they participated in the World's Strongest Tag Team Tournament, which they won by defeating Grigory Verichev and Koba Krutanize in the final on December 9 to win the inaugural WWA World Martial Arts Tag Team Championship. FMW phased away the martial arts style and emphasized on the deathmatch wrestling as its key feature during this time. Onita lost his World Martial Arts Heavyweight Championship to Big Titan on January 15, 1992. Onita and Goto lost the World Martial Arts Tag Team Championship to Sabu and Horace Boulder in a no ropes barbed wire street fight deathmatch on May 7. Onita regained the World Martial Arts Heavyweight Championship by defeating former boxing champion Leon Spinks in a cage match on May 24, which earned a rapid rise in popularity and stardom to Onita for having beaten a famous celebrity. A month later, Onita lost the title to The Sheik on June 25 because of an injury sustained from an attack by Tiger Jeet Singh before the match. Sheik would later reward the title to Singh. Onita lost to Singh in a jungle deathmatch on June 30, before defeating him in a no ropes exploding barbed wire deathmatch to win his fourth World Martial Arts Heavyweight Championship at the 3rd Anniversary Show.

Onita continued his success by winning the Street Fight Tournament with former rival Grigory Verichev on December 7. He ended his feud with The Sheik by defeating him for the United States Championship on January 18, 1993; Onita later returned the belt to Sheik saying that Sheik deserved the title for holding it for over a decade. This earned him Sheik's respect and both men ended their feud and became allies. Onita's success streak continued as he defeated Terry Funk in the first-ever no ropes exploding barbed wire time bomb deathmatch at the 4th Anniversary Show on May 5. Onita renewed his rivalry with Mr. Pogo, who returned to FMW in the summer of 1993 and the World Martial Arts Heavyweight Championship was replaced with the FMW Brass Knuckles Heavyweight Championship. Onita defeated Pogo in a no ropes exploding barbed wire time bomb deathmatch to win the vacant Brass Knuckles Heavyweight Championship at the Summer Spectacular show on August 22. Onita successfully defended the title against W*ING's former ace Mitsuhiro Matsunaga in a no ropes exploding barbed wire deathmatch at Year End Spectacular, and then the two men became allies to feud with Mr. Pogo and his entourage.

==== Second retirement (1994–1995) ====
On January 6, 1994, Onita lost the Brass Knuckles Heavyweight Championship to Mr. Pogo in a street fight. After losing the title, Onita began his next feud with Genichiro Tenryu after the team of Onita and Tarzan Goto defeated Tenryu and Ashura Hara at Wrestling and Romance's Revolution Rumble when Onita pinned Tenryu. Onita and Tenryu competed in a no ropes exploding barbed wire deathmatch at 5th Anniversary Show on May 5, which stipulated that if Onita lost, he must retire from professional wrestling. Tenryu defeated Onita to even the scores and then Onita debuted his "Mr. Liar" character by saying that he was not going to retire immediately and that the retirement stipulation would take place a year later. Onita began his retirement tour which would conclude at the following year's 6th Anniversary Show. Onita reunited with Tenryu as the two teamed with Crusher Bam Bam Bigelow at WAR's 2nd Anniversary Show and the trio won a Six-Man Tag Team Tournament.

On July 31, Onita teamed with Mitsuhiro Matsunaga to defeat Mr. Pogo and Hisakatsu Oya to win the Brass Knuckles Tag Team Championship. Around the same time, Onita renewed his feud with Masashi Aoyagi, who had returned to FMW and attacked Onita after a match. Their rivalry culminated in a no ropes electrified explosive barbed wire barricade double hell match at Summer Spectacular, which Onita won. Onita defeated Mr. Pogo to win his sixth Brass Knuckles Heavyweight Championship on September 7. After the match, former W*ING wrestler Yukihiro Kanemura made his FMW debut and attacked Onita to avenge the demise of W*ING. Mitsuhiro Matsunaga visited Kanemura at hospital as Kanemura was getting treated for some burns which he had suffered during a past match. Onita accused Matsunaga of turning on FMW and mistrusting his loyalty and this angered Matsunaga, who then joined Kanemura and Mr. Pogo to form W*ING Alliance and Onita feuded with the group for the rest of his retirement tour. As a result, Onita and Matsunaga broke up as a team and vacated the Brass Knuckles Tag Team Championship in October.

On December 1, Onita debuted his alter ego "The Great Nita", which was based and stylized on The Great Muta. The team of Nita and Tarzan Goto defeated Hisakatsu Oya and Mr. Pogo in a no ropes exploding barbed wire double hell deathmatch. Onita would return as Nita to defeat Pogo in a lumberjack match on December 20 and would continue to use this alternative character on several occasions. Onita lost the Brass Knuckles Heavyweight Championship to Mr. Pogo's alter ego "Pogo Daiyo" on January 21, 1995. On February 24, Onita and his pupil Mr. Gannosuke defeated Pogo and The Gladiator to win the Brass Knuckles Tag Team Championship. They lost the title to Pogo and W*ING Kanemura on March 7. Speculation arose over the person to succeed Onita as the promotion's ace. Mitsuhiro Matsunaga had been the original choice but citing that W*ING had failed with Matsunaga as the ace, Onita had to change the decision and give the spot to Tarzan Goto, who would be Onita's opponent in his retirement match at the 6th Anniversary Show. Goto left FMW and took away his pupils Mr. Gannosuke and Flying Kid Ichihara as he was upset for putting over Onita again after having done it so many times in the past.

On March 30, Great Nita lost to Pogo Daiyo in a lumberjack match. Mr. Pogo refused to be Onita's opponent at 6th Anniversary Show and then Takashi Ishikawa was finally selected as the ace until Hayabusa interrupted Onita at a press conference and volunteered to be his opponent at the event as Hayabusa had been convinced by Shoichi Arai, whom Onita had sold the company around this time. Hayabusa was ultimately selected to be Onita's opponent in his retirement match. Just one day shy of his retirement match, Onita defeated Pogo in a barbed wire double hell deathmatch to win his record-setting seventh and final Brass Knuckles Heavyweight Championship on May 4. The following night at the 6th Anniversary Show, Onita successfully defended the title against Hayabusa in a no ropes exploding barbed wire deathmatch. After the match, Onita vacated the title due to his retirement from wrestling to pursue an acting career. During this time, he starred in the movie Dan Gan (Japanese for "bullet"), which would later be adopted as the nickname for Onita's pupil, Masato Tanaka. Onita's acting career flopped and he ventured a return to wrestling.

==== Return (1996–1997) ====
After a sabbatical (getting his high school diploma, as he had dropped out of high school when he was 16), Onita made a surprise return to FMW on March 15, 1996, along with his former rivals W*ING Alliance to rescue FMW's team from an attack by the Puerto Rican Army. He convinced the FMW wrestlers to challenge Puerto Rican Army at the 7th Anniversary Show and announced that he would be present in the crowd at the event. He also sold off his jacket that he wore for his retirement match at the 6th Anniversary Show to assist FMW team get the money for their match against the Puerto Rican Army. Onita made his next appearance on October 28, where his former rival Mr. Pogo begged him to come out of retirement and team with him against the Funk Masters of Wrestling in Pogo's retirement match at Year End Spectacular. Onita initially rejected Pogo's request and then rescued Pogo from an assault by Funk Masters of Wrestling on November 26 and agreed to come out of his retirement to team with Pogo. At the Year End Spectacular event, the FMW team of Onita, Pogo, Masato Tanaka and Tetsuhiro Kuroda defeated Funk Masters of Wrestling's Terry Funk, Hisakatsu Oya and The Headhunters in a Texas Tornado Street Fight Deathmatch.

Onita had supposedly returned to the company for only one match until he began working part-time for the company on March 14, 1997, by teaming with Koji Nakagawa, Masato Tanaka and Tetsuhiro Kuroda to defeat The Headhunters, Hisakatsu Oya and The Gladiator in a street fight. During this time, Onita also quietly ended his feud with W*ING Alliance as the group joined him in his feud with the Funk Masters of Wrestling. At the 8th Anniversary Show, the team of Onita, Masato Tanaka and W*ING Kanemura defeated Terry Funk, Cactus Jack and The Gladiator in a Texas Tornado Street Fight Deathmatch.

==== ZEN and Team Zero (1997–1998) ====
Onita headlined the Fall Spectacular event on September 28, 1997, against W*ING Kanemura in a no rope barbed wire electrified dynamite land mine time bomb death match, which stipulated that if Onita lost, he must retire and if Kanemura lost then W*ING Alliance would be forced to disband. Onita defeated Kanemura, forcing W*ING to disband. Onita became upset at the W*ING Alliance members Kanemura, Hideki Hosaka and Hido, who were upset as no group would accept them and he became enraged at FMW leaders Hayabusa, Koji Nakagawa and Masato Tanaka on their leadership of the FMW team. On September 30, Onita held a press conference in which he publicly denounced himself as a FMW wrestler and formed a New World Order (nWo)-themed faction ZEN with W*ING members and FMW wrestler Tetsuhiro Kuroda. As a result, Onita turned heel for the first and only time in FMW history. On October 14, the team of Onita, Hido and Kuroda defeated Hayabusa, Koji Nakagawa and Masato Tanaka to win the World Street Fight 6-Man Tag Team Championship.

On October 19, Onita and Yukihiro Kanemura defeated Mr. Gannosuke and Hisakatsu Oya to win the Brass Knuckles Tag Team Championship. Funk Masters of Wrestling came to an end as its leader Terry Funk left FMW, while the remaining members Mr. Gannosuke, Hisakatsu Oya and The Gladiator joined ZEN, which had now become the main villainous group in FMW against the FMW team led by Hayabusa. Onita and Kanemura were stripped of the Brass Knuckles Tag Team Championship in November due to Onita's inactivity and ZEN also lost the World Street Fight 6-Man Tag Team Championship to Hayabusa, Hisakatsu Oya and Masato Tanaka during the Super Extreme Wrestling War tour. During this tour, Mr. Gannosuke and Yukihiro Kanemura, along with Hido, grew upset at Onita for booking himself in the main event match on December 19 against Masato Tanaka instead of booking Gannosuke and Kanemura's match. This exploded when the team of Hayabusa, Jinsei Shinzaki and Masato Tanaka defeated Atsushi Onita, Mr. Gannosuke and Yukihiro Kanemura in a WarGames match on December 22. After the match, Gannosuke and Kanemura attacked Onita and quit ZEN, along with Hido and Koji Nakagawa joined Onita as ZEN's newest member. As a result, Onita reverted to being face along with ZEN.

ZEN began feuding with the newly formed Team No Respect, which evolved from legitimate heat between Onita and Kodo Fuyuki, who was getting a lot of influence and booking power in the company. Onita wanted to return FMW to its old deathmatch style ideology while Shoichi Arai and Kodo Fuyuki were toning down the deathmatch content. On February 13, Onita, Koji Nakagawa and Tetsuhiro Kuroda defeated TNR's Mr. Gannosuke, Yukihiro Kanemura and Jado to win the World Street Fight 6-Man Tag Team Championship. Onita's rivalry with Fuyuki would lead to a match between the two at 9th Anniversary Show, which stipulated that Onita must disband ZEN if he lost. Onita lost the lumberjack match and was forced to disband ZEN but he said that he would break the group only if Kodo Fuyuki, Yukihiro Kanemura and Hido would beat Onita, Koji Nakagawa and Tetsuhiro Kuroda for the World Street Fight 6-Man Tag Team Championship at ZEN's promoted show on May 5. Onita's team would lose after Nakagawa suffered an injury. Nakagawa continued to fake injury and would ultimately be revealed as the man responsible for breaking ZEN after he turned on Onita during a Brass Knuckles Tag Team Championship match against The New Footloose on May 31.

After the breakup of ZEN, Onita took a hiatus as he was unhappy with his position in the company. He made an appearance for FMW's working partner Extreme Championship Wrestling (ECW) on June 26 by costing The Sandman and Tommy Dreamer, a match against Dudley Boyz to set up a no ropes exploding barbed wire deathmatch against Sandman in ECW but the match never took place as Onita returned to FMW on July 20 to rescue Shoichi Arai from an assault by Team No Respect. At Atsushi Onita Presents Liar, Liar on August 11, Onita released his former ZEN teammates Hideki Hosaka and Tetsuhiro Kuroda from Team No Respect's slavery and saved Shoichi Arai's job as FMW President by defeating TNR in a weapons deathmatch. On August 21, Onita formed a group called Team Zero with Kuroda, Hosaka, Yoshinori Sasaki and Mr. Pogo #2 and the group feuded with TNR throughout the fall of 1998. Onita's former rival Mr. Pogo returned to FMW and the two feuded with each other, with Onita defeating Pogo in a match on November 20 to end their rivalry in FMW once and for all. This would be Onita's last match and last appearance in FMW as he left the company after the match as Shoichi Arai refused to restore him as the promotion's ace due to Onita receiving backlash from FMW's roster due to his reputation as an egomaniac and selfish.

=== Freelancing (1998–present) ===
He used the promotional names "USO" (all caps version of the Japanese word for "lie"), "Jado" ("evil ways"; not to be confused with the wrestler of the same name), "Onita Pro" and "Project X."

Onita made a few appearances for New Japan Pro-Wrestling (NJPW), in 1999, establishing himself as a heel, since he was a FMW employee, the crowd would not accept him on a NJPW ring, which prompted him to gain a lot of heat. During that time, he would cut promos insulting his interviewers (such as spitting water in their faces, physically assaulting and threatening them) and future targets. On January 4, during the Wrestling World Tokyo Dome event, he faced Kensuke Sasaki, losing by disqualification after throwing a fireball to Sasaki's face. Then on April 10, he wrestled Masahiro Chono on a No-Rope Explosive Barbed-Wire Death Match, ending in no-contest after both Chono and Onita were knocked out. Shortly after that, Onita allied himself with Chono and his Team 2000 faction against the nWo Japan. On July 21, he, Chono and AKIRA defeated nWo Japan's Hiro Saito, Hiroyoshi Tenzan and their leader, Keiji Mutoh. For a short period, he brought back his Great Nita persona, facing Keiji Mutoh's, The Great Muta in a No Rope Explosive Barbed Wire Barricade Explosive Land Mine match (also dubbed Double Hell Deathmatch) on August 28, losing the match after Muta used Nita's kama to knock him down. One year later, he challenged Riki Choshu to a barbed wire deathmatch on July 30, 2000: Choshu accepted and came out of retirement to wrestle him. Choshu defeated Onita in a squash after launching him in the explosive barbed wires multiple times, and making him pass out while locking him in his finisher, the Sasori-Gatame.

In 2001, he returned to AJPW for one night only, at the Tokyo Dome, to team with Terry Funk against Abdullah the Butcher and Giant Kimala. Whereas AJPW fans had already known Funk and Abdullah's willingness to brawl, Onita also played a huge part in the match, and his team emerged victorious.

In 2002, following FMW's closure Onita appeared briefly in WEW, run by Hiromichi Fuyuki. The storyline saw Onita blaming Fuyuki's "Entertainment Pro Wrestling" business strategy and supposed embezzlement of money for causing FMW to close, and appeared to be paving the road to an eventual match between Onita and Fuyuki before Fuyuki abruptly announced his retirement due to cancer that would eventually claim his life in March 2003.

Onita attempted to resurrect the FMW name with another promotion (called Onita FMW since he did not own the rights to the FMW name), but the promotion would fold after only three months. Onita would retire once again on September 23, 2003, losing a death match to The Great Sasuke, but this would not last long. Onita fought yet another retirement match on March 26, 2005, being pinned by Genichiro Tenryu. This also would be disregarded, as he would come out of retirement in May 2008 and would begin promoting his own cards again in July.

In the late 2000s and early 2010s, Onita kept on bringing Death Matches, (though mostly six-man affairs with Ichiro Yaguchi as one of his frequent partners), to promotions such as Osaka Pro Wrestling, Pro Wrestling Zero1 and Pro Wrestling NOAH. On December 12, 2014, he returned to AJPW to team with Fuchi and defeat the promotion's current junior standard bearers, Último Dragón and Yoshinobu Kanemaru.

In April 2015, FMW was again resurrected with Onita as its central wrestler.

On July 11, 2016, Onita announced the foundation of a new promotion named Fire Puroresu, which was set to hold its first show on August 26. On July 24, Onita fractured his right arm in a match, where he lost the Bakuha-ō Championship to Masakatsu Funaki, putting his participation in Fire Puroresu's inaugural event at risk.

On November 27, 2016, Onita returned to All Japan, where he and fellow first class graduate Masanobu Fuchi defeated Atsushi Aoki and Hikaru Sato to become the 100th All Asia Tag Team Champions. Two days later, Onita announced he was planning to retire from professional wrestling at a special event at Kawasaki Stadium in October 2017.

On May 10, 2017, Onita announced his retirement tour, which would conclude with his final match on October 31. Onita's plans for Kawasaki Stadium had fallen through and his final match would instead take place at Korakuen Hall in Tokyo. Onita claimed that this, his seventh retirement, would be his "true" retirement. On June 20, Onita and Fuchi lost the All Asia Tag Team Championship back to Aoki and Sato. Onita's retirement tour also took him to the United States, where he worked for Combat Zone Wrestling (CZW) on August 5. Prior to his actual retirement, Onita retired the Great Nita character on August 27. On October 31, Onita's retirement took place in a six-man barbed wire match, where he teamed with Kai and Shingo Takagi to defeat Nosawa Rongai, Kazuyuki Fujita and Kendo Kashin by pinning Rongai.

However, Onita came out of retirement, the following year, on October 28, 2018, for Pro Wrestling A-Team. Onita fought Matt Tremont to a no-contest. Later, the latter wanted him to be his tag team partner against Masada and DJ Hyde.

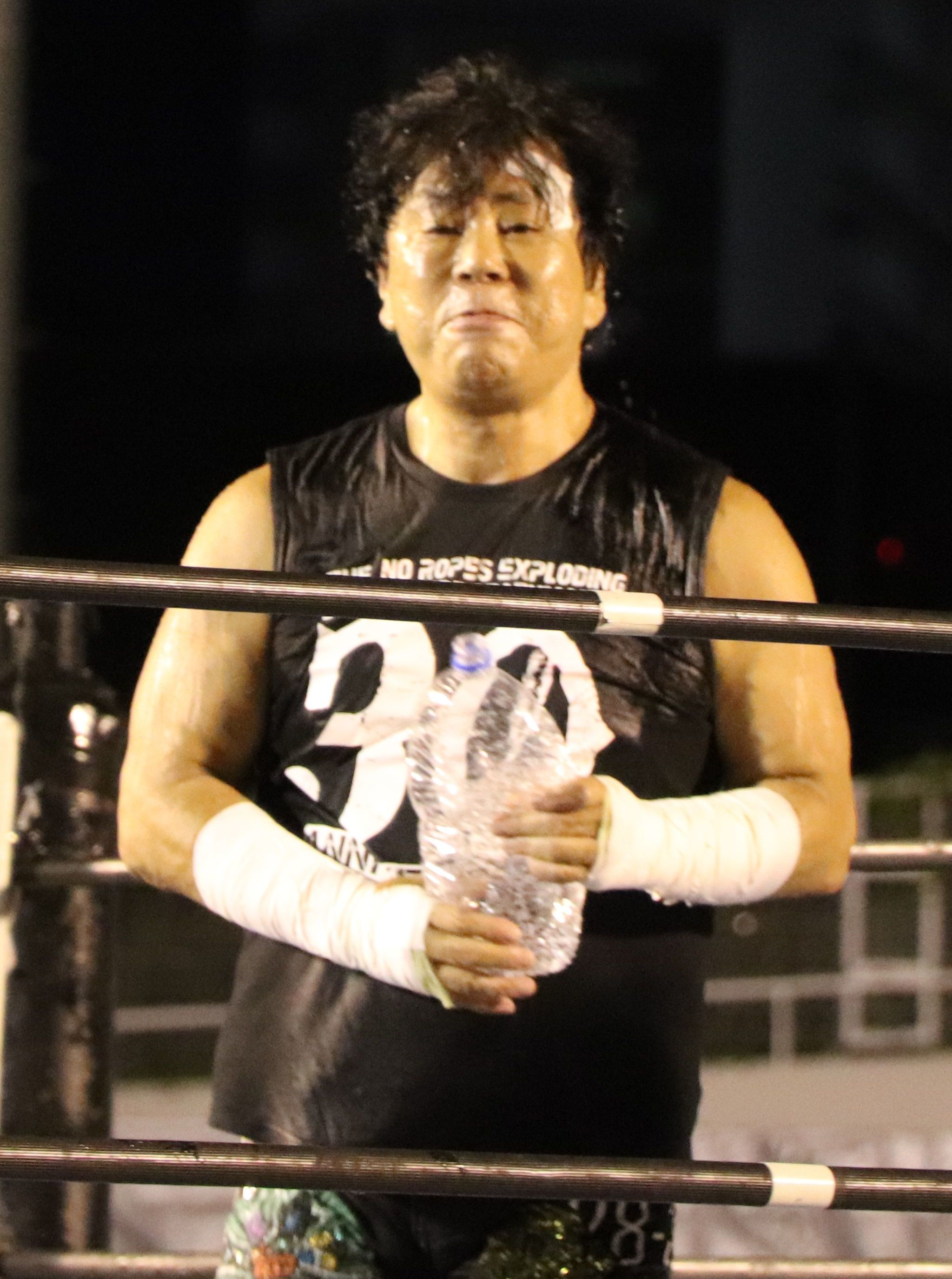
Onita in August 2020

On May 6, 2021, Onita announced the formation of a new promotion that would focus on Explosion Matches. The promotion is called FMWE, and they plan to have events shown online for fans to see all over the world. Onita also hopes to finally bring real Explosion Matches to the United States. At the press conference for FMWE it was also announced that the first show would be held on July 4, 2021, at Tsurumi Fruit and Vegetable Market in Yokohama City.

On October 31, 2021, in Trenton, NJ at the Trenton Thunder Ballpark, Onita stepped into the ring again with Matt Tremont to have an Exploding Barbed Wire Deathmatch. The match was promoted by FMWE and Tremont's H2O Wrestling.

As of 2025, Onita still wrestles at 68 years old.

== Political career ==
Though he originally dropped out of high school, Onita returned to finish his education when he was in his late thirties. In 2001, he won the 19th House of Councilors election as a representative of the Liberal Democratic Party, following Antonio Inoki and Hiroshi Hase to a seat in the Japanese Diet. One of his first major acts in office was to launch a post-9/11 humanitarian mission to Afghanistan, where he performed professional wrestling matches in crudely constructed rings made of sticks and rope, to benefit the children. This was all documented on film.

Like fellow professional wrestler Scott Steiner, Onita has also claimed to have broken Wilt Chamberlain's record of sleeping with 20,000 women. Coincidentally, his exit from politics was forced by a sex scandal in which he was alleged to have used government accommodations to host a threesome with a pornographic film actress and a female employee of the Ministry of Land, Infrastructure, Transport and Tourism. After retirement from politics, he lent his name and image to a Nintendo DS game, Atsushi Onita's Political Quiz.

== Championships and accomplishments ==
- All Japan Pro Wrestling
  - All Asia Tag Team Championship (3 times) – with Masanobu Fuchi (1), Yoshitatsu (1) and Toy Kojima (1)
  - NWA International Junior Heavyweight Championship (1 time)
- Continental Wrestling Association
  - AWA Southern Tag Team Championship (3 times) – with Masanobu Fuchi
- Empresa Mexicana de Lucha Libre
  - NWA International Junior Heavyweight Championship (1 time)
- Frontier Martial-Arts Wrestling
  - FMW Brass Knuckles Heavyweight Championship (7 times) (Note: Onita's first reign was as WWA Brass Knuckles Heavyweight Champion. His second, third, and fourth reigns were as WWA World Martial Arts Heavyweight Champion. His final three reigns were as FMW Brass Knuckles Heavyweight Champion.)
  - FMW Brass Knuckles Tag Team Championship (4 times) – with Tarzan Goto (1), Mitsuhiro Matsunaga (1), Mr. Gannosuke (1), and W*ING Kanemura (1)
  - FMW World Street Fight 6-Man Tag Team Championship (4 times) – with Tetsuhiro Kuroda and Hido (1), Koji Nakagawa and Tetsuhiro Kuroda (1), Masato Tanaka and Hideki Hosaka (1), and Hideki Hosaka and Sean Guinness (1)
  - FMW United States Championship (1 time)
  - Barbed Wire Deathmatch Tournament (1991)
  - World's Strongest Tag Team Tournament (1992) – with Tarzan Goto
  - Street Fight Tag Team Tournament (1992) – with Grigory Verichev
  - Six Man Tag Team Tournament (1994) – with Tarzan Goto and Sambo Asako
- Mid-Atlantic Championship Wrestling
  - NWA International Junior Heavyweight Championship (1 time)
- Onita Pro
  - Barbed-Wire Street Fight 6-Man Tag Team Championship (2 time) – with Shigeo Okumura and Mitsunobu Kikuzawa (1), Exciting Yoshida and Mitsunobu Kikuzawa (1)
- Pro Wrestling Illustrated
  - PWI ranked him #43 of the 500 best singles wrestlers in the PWI 500 in 1999
  - PWI ranked him #123 of the 500 best singles wrestlers during the PWI Years in 2003
- Pro Wrestling Zero1
  - Blast King Championship (3 times)
  - Blast King Tag Team Championship (1 time) – with Chigusa Nagayo
- Tokyo Sports
  - Best Tag Team Award (2015) with Chigusa Nagayo
  - Effort Award (1979)
  - Fighting Spirit Award (2014)
  - Match of the Year (1990) vs. Tarzan Goto on August 4
  - Match of the Year (1994) with Tarzan Goto vs. Genichiro Tenryu and Ashura Hara on March 2
  - Outstanding Performance Award (1991)
  - Special Award (1989)
  - Topic Award (1991)
  - Wrestler of the Year (1990)
- Wrestle Association "R"
  - Six Man Tag Team Tournament (1994) – with Genichiro Tenryu and Crusher Bam Bam Bigelow
- Wrestling Observer Newsletter awards
  - Most Disgusting Promotional Tactic (1990) Stabbing of José González storyline
  - Best Babyface (1993, 1994)
  - Most Charismatic (1994)
  - Wrestling Observer Newsletter Hall of Fame (Class of 1996)

== Video games ==
- Onita Atsushi FMW, a fighting game released in 1993 by Pony Canyon for the Super Famicom
- Itsu Demo Doko Demo: Onita Atsushi no Seiji Quiz DS, a political quiz game released by Milestone in 2007 for the Nintendo DS
