= WAR Revolution Rumble =

Wrestling and Romance supercard event

Revolution Rumble '94 in Ryōgoku Kokugikan
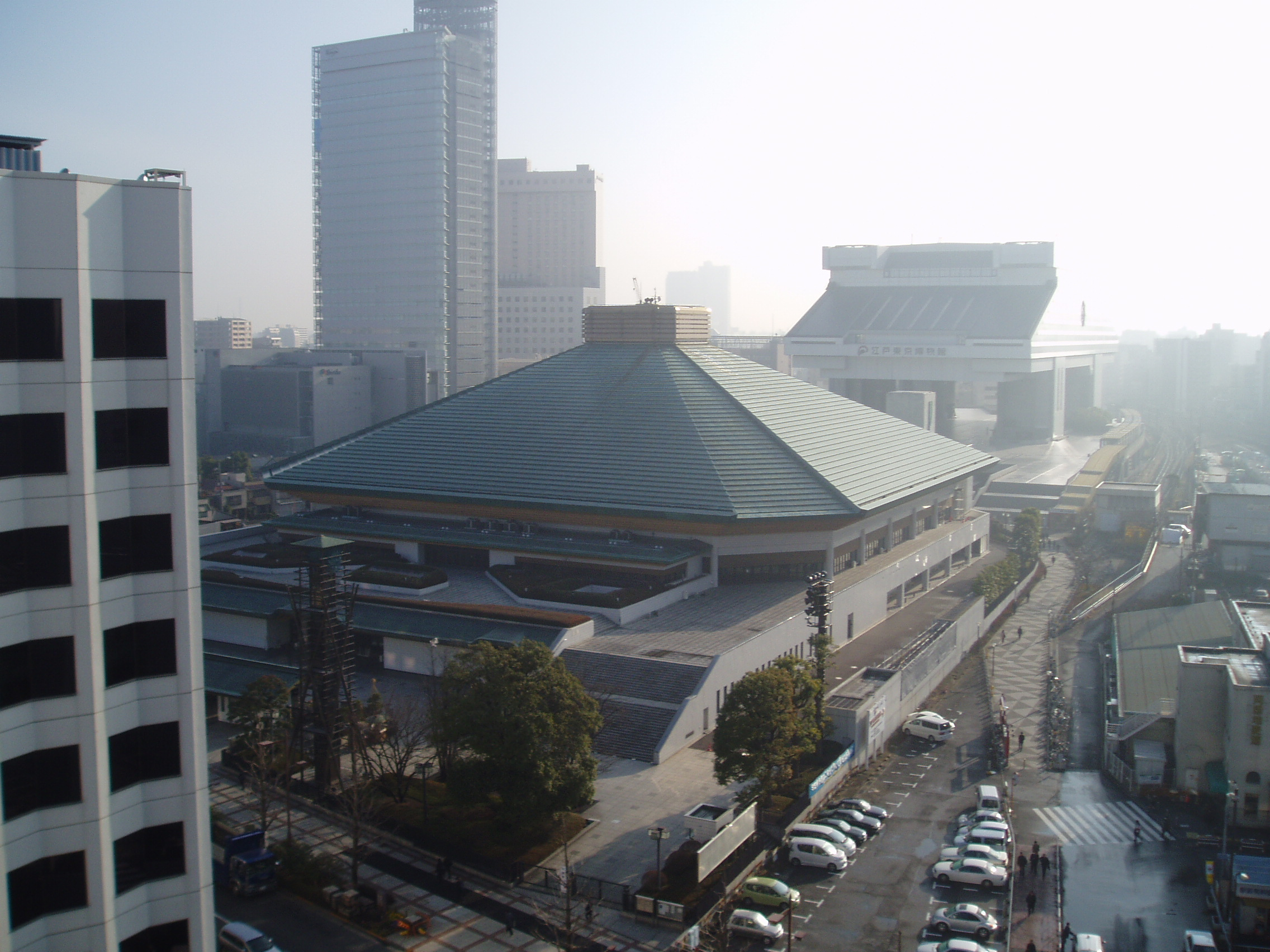
- Ryōgoku Kokugikan
- Promotion: Wrestling and Romance
- Date: March 2, 1994
- City: Tokyo, Japan
- Venue: Ryōgoku Kokugikan
- Attendance: 11,000

Revolution Rumble '94 in Ryōgoku Kokugikan was a major professional wrestling supercard event produced by Wrestling and Romance on March 2, 1994 at the Ryōgoku Kokugikan in Tokyo, Japan. The event was a success as it drew a crowd of 11,000 fans.

Nine professional wrestling matches were contested at the event. The main event was an interpromotional tag team match, in which Ashura Hara and Genichiro Tenryu represented WAR against Frontier Martial-Arts Wrestling's Atsushi Onita and Tarzan Goto. The match was very well received by critics and audiences and famed Japanese sports newspaper Tokyo Sports named it the Match of the Year for 1994.

== Event ==
Other on-screen personnel
Role:	Name:
Commentator	Toshio Suzuki
Commentator	Kagehiro Osano

=== Preliminary matches ===
The opening match of the event was a tag team match, in which the team of Masanobu Kurisu and Nobukazu Hirai took on the tag team of Jado and Gedo. Jado and Gedo hit an aided superbomb to Hirai to get the win.

In the following match, Koki Kitahara defeated Kim Duk by pinning him with a crucifix.

Next, Arashi took on Hiromichi Fuyuki in a five-round match with each match having a three minute time limit. After battling each other throughout the five rounds, the match ended in a time limit draw. After the match, Fuyuki challenged Arashi for an extra sixth round, which Arashi agreed. Fuyuki pinned Arashi with an inside cradle to pick up the victory.

Later, Masao Orihara and Ultimo Dragon represented WAR against Michinoku Pro Wrestling representatives SATO and The Great Sasuke in a junior heavyweight tag team match. During the match, SATO hit a suicide dive onto Ultimo on the floor and then Orihara hit a springboard moonsault on SATO, followed by Sasuke nailing a Sasuke Special II onto the three men. After a back and forth action, Ultimo hit an Asai moonsault on SATO followed by a German suplex for the win.

In the next match, Super Strong Machine took on Lionheart. Machine hit a diving headbutt to Lionheart to win the match. The match was followed by another singles match, in which King Haku defeated Mr. Hughes after executing a backdrop suplex on Hughes.

In the penultimate match of the evening, Koji Kitao took on fellow former sumo wrestler Koji Ishinriki. Kitao hit an axe kick on Ishinriki to knock him out for the victory.

=== Main event match ===
Ashura Hara and Genichiro Tenryu represented WAR against Frontier Martial-Arts Wrestling representatives Atsushi Onita and Tarzan Goto in the interpromotional main event. Goto and Hara started the match. Midway into the match, Goto made Tenryu bleed by hitting him with a steel chair to weaken him, leaving Hara at a temporary disadvantage. Tenryu made a comeback by hitting Onita with a few chops and a lariat. Tenryu then controlled Onita and Goto until the effects of the chair shot by Goto dazed him, allowing Onita to execute a Thunder Fire Powerbomb to Tenryu to win the match.

== Reception ==
Revolution Rumble was positively received by critics and audiences alike. The interpromotional tag team main event of the show was appreciated by the Tokyo Sports newspaper, which presented it with the Match of the Year Award for 1994.

Ryan Mancuso of Puroresu Central gave a score of 6 to the event and rated it an average event. He appreciated the interpromotional tag team matches of WAR wrestlers against Michinoku Pro Wrestling and Frontier Martial-Arts Wrestling. He appreciated the main event match "This was a one match show with the FMW vs. WAR main event delivering. It shows people that a good match is not determined by how moves the wrestlers could do, but when the moves are used", while praising the junior heavyweight tag team match between WAR and MPW as a "nice bonus" and added that "those two matches are worth checking out".

== Aftermath ==
Atsushi Onita's pinfall victory over Genichiro Tenryu at Revolution Rumble led to the formation of a friendship between the two men. Onita's pinfall victory over Tenryu in Tenryu's home promotion WAR set up the main event for the FMW 5th Anniversary Show on May 5 at the Kawasaki Stadium, in which Onita would compete against Tenryu in an interpromotional no rope exploding barbed wire deathmatch. Onita added a stipulation to spark public interest that he would retire from wrestling if he lost the match. Tenryu was a big draw in Japan and a big favourite for puroresu fans, which led to the event drawing a crowd of 52,000 people and FMW was able to produce a successful event. Tenryu defeated Onita to return the favour. Onita returned to WAR at the 2nd Anniversary of Revolution to team with Tenryu and Crusher Bam Bigelow as the trio won a six-man tag team tournament.

Hiromichi Fuyuki went on to become the top villain of WAR by forming the Fuyuki-Gun stable with Jado and Gedo. On June 30, Fuyuki-Gun won a tournament to become the inaugural World Six-Man Tag Team Champions and achieved success as the group would win the title four more times.

== Results ==
No.	Results	Stipulations	Times
1	Jado and Gedo defeated Masanobu Kurisu and Nobukazu Hirai	Tag team match	11:02
2	Koki Kitahara defeated Kim Duk	Singles match	10:44
3	Arashi versus Hiromichi Fuyuki ended in a time limit draw	Singles match	15:00
4	Hiromichi Fuyuki defeated Arashi	Singles match	1:27
5	Masao Orihara and Ultimo Dragon defeated SATO and The Great Sasuke	Tag team match	28:13
6	Super Strong Machine defeated Lionheart	Singles match	8:11
7	King Haku defeated Mr. Hughes	Singles match	10:36
8	Koji Kitao defeated Koji Ishinriki by knockout	Singles match	4:05
9	Atsushi Onita and Tarzan Goto defeated Ashura Hara and Genichiro Tenryu	Tag team match	18:13
