= FMW 4th Anniversary Show =

FMW 4th Anniversary Show: Origin
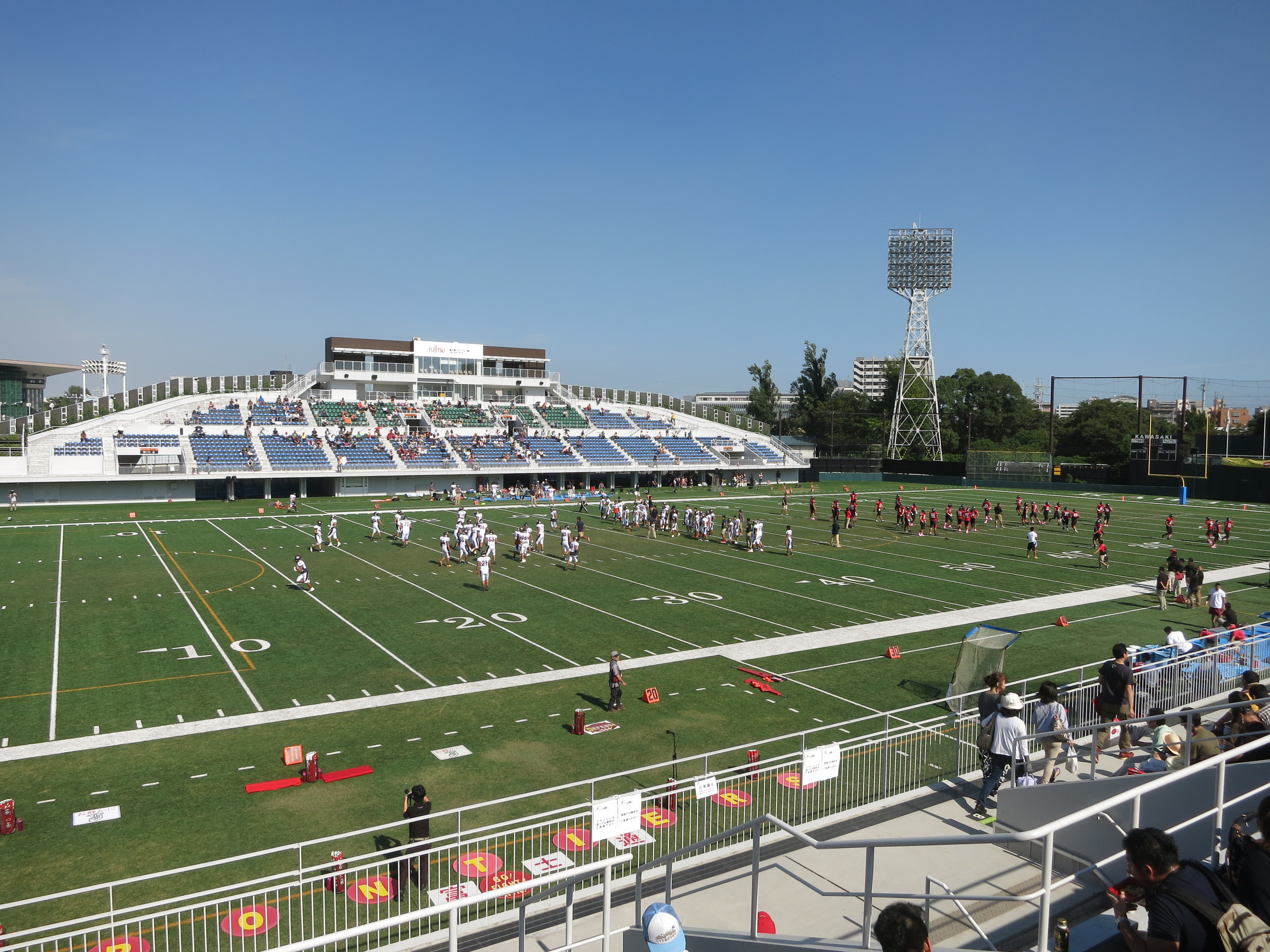
- Promotion: Frontier Martial-Arts Wrestling
- Date: May 5, 1993
- City: Kawasaki, Kanagawa, Japan
- Venue: Kawasaki Stadium
- Attendance: 41,000

Event chronology
← Previous; FMW 3rd Anniversary Show: Fall Spectacular	Next → Summer Spectacular

FMW Anniversary Show chronology
← Previous; 3rd Anniversary	Next → 5th Anniversary

FMW 4th Anniversary Show: Origin was a professional wrestling event produced by Frontier Martial-Arts Wrestling (FMW). The event took place on May 5, 1993 at the Kawasaki Stadium in Kawasaki, Kanagawa, Japan. This was the fourth edition of the company's flagship event Anniversary Show, commemorating the fourth anniversary of the company.

The main event was a no rope exploding barbed wire time bomb deathmatch between Atsushi Onita and Terry Funk, which Onita won. The event was also notable for a Captain's Fall Losing Captain Leaves Town No Rope Barbed Wire Tornado Street Fight Deathmatch pitting Tarzan Goto, The Great Punk and Katsuji Ueda against Team Canada members Ricky Fuji, Big Titan and The Gladiator in a losing effort. The event featured interpromotional matches between female wrestlers of FMW and Ladies Legend Pro-Wrestling (LLPW) and All Japan Women's Pro-Wrestling (AJW).

== Background ==
=== Production ===
FMW decided to capitalize on the huge success of the 2nd Anniversary Show on September 23, 1991 at the huge Kawasaki Stadium as the show drew a crowd of 33,000. FMW booked their 4th Anniversary Show at the Kawasaki Stadium on May 5, 1993 to commemorate the fourth anniversary of the company and the huge crowd attraction was a dream match between the company's promoter and main star Atsushi Onita and hardcore wrestling idol Terry Funk. FMW signed Kawasaki Stadium to be the company's venue for future shows on May 5.

=== Storylines ===
Atsushi Onita defeated Tiger Jeet Singh to regain the WWA World Martial Arts Heavyweight Championship at the 3rd Anniversary Show and ended his rivalry with Sabu and The Sheik after successfully defending the title against Sabu on January 12 and winning Sheik's United States Championship on January 18. Onita returned the title to Sheik after the match because he felt that Sheik deserved the title which formed a trio of Onita, Sheik and Sabu, leading to Sheik and Sabu transitioning into fan favorites. On February 16, Onita defeated The Gladiator in a no rope exploding barbed wire deathmatch. During the match, Ricky Fuji wrapped barbed wire around Onita's neck and Onita accidentally swallowed some of the barbed wire which gave him a near-fatal injury and put him out of action for two months. He returned to FMW in a six-man tag team match on April 22.

On January 12, 1993, the fan favorite team of Sambo Asako, Ricky Fuji, Mr. Gannosuke and Great Punk took on the villainous team of Big Titan, The Gladiator, The Sheik and Dr. Luther in an eight-man elimination tag team match. Fuji turned on FMW by causing Goto to get eliminated by Big Titan and became a villain. Fuji formed a stable Team Canada with Big Titan, Gladiator, Luther, Horace Boulder and Dr. Hannibal, which would lead to matches between FMW and Team Canada at 4th Anniversary Show.

Megumi Kudo and Combat Toyoda lost to All Japan Women's Pro-Wrestling (AJW)'s Bull Nakano and Akira Hokuto at 3rd Anniversary Show. This match received huge acclaim and paved the way for more interpromotional matches between women of AJW and FMW. On November 27, 1992, FMW's Eriko Tsuchiya and Yoshika Maedomari defeated former AJW Tag Team Champions Sakie Hasegawa and Debbie Malenko. The success of AJW and FMW's match lead to Kudo and Toyoda being invited to AJW to participate in the Dream Slam events. They lost to AJW's WWWA World Tag Team Champions Manami Toyota and Toshiyo Yamada in a highly acclaimed main event of Dream Slam I. Kudo and Toyoda defeated Las Cachorras Orientales (Etsuko Mita and Mima Shimoda) at Dream Slam II. On April 22, it was announced that Kudo and Toyoda would take on Toyota and Yamada in a Dream Slam I rematch at 4th Anniversary Show.

== Event ==
=== Preliminary matches ===
Eiji Ezaki defeated Koji Nakagawa in the opening match by performing a Moonsault. The second match was a women's wrestling match in which Rie Nakamura defeated Keiko Iwame with a rolling cradle.

Miwa Sato, Eriko Tsuchiya, Yoshika Maedomari, Kumiko Matsuda and Yukie Nabeno represented FMW against LLPW's Eagle Sawai, Utako Ozumi, Yasha Kurenai, Midori Saito and Mikiko Futagami in a Captain's Fall match. Sato captained Combat Army while Sawai captained her team. Maedomari eliminated Futagami to gain the first elimination of the match. Sawai rebounded by eliminating Maedomari. Tsuchiya then eliminated Kurenai and Sawai pinned the opposing team's captain Sato following a Powerbomb to win the match. Eliminations for both teams tied at 2.

The Sheik and Sabu defeated Team Canada's Dr. Luther and Dr. Hannibal in a tag team match when Sabu performed a Moonsault on Luther. After the match, Sabu went crazy by putting himself through a table with a Moonsault and then put himself through the second table with a flying leg drop. The Great Sasuke, Kendo and Battle Ranger Z defeated Super Delfin, Espanto IV and Espanto V in a junior heavyweight six-man tag team match when Kendo pinned Espanto V with a cradle. LLPW's Shinobu Kandori defeated Victoria Kazumiya with a Fujiwara armbar in a different style fight.

Megumi Kudo and Combat Toyoda took on AJW's Toshiyo Yamada and Manami Toyota in a rematch of the Dream Slam I main event. Yamada and Toyota performed many high-flying moves to control the early portion of the match until Kudo and Toyoda delivered a double clothesline to gain momentum and then Kudo performed a tiger suplex on Toyota to win the match.

FMW's The Great Punk, Katsuji Ueda and Tarzan Goto took on Team Canada's Ricky Fuji, Big Titan and The Gladiator in a Captain's Fall losing captain leaves town no rope barbed wire tornado street fight deathmatch. Fuji captained his team while Punk captained FMW's team. Titan eliminated Ueda with a Powerbomb to gain advantage and then Goto eliminated Titan with a Lariat to even the score. Awesome was tripped into the barbed wire and then Goto and Punk double teamed Fuji until Awesome escaped it and performed an Awesome Bomb on Punk and Fuji followed with a German suplex to eliminate him and get the win for Team Canada.

Grigory Verichev took on Leon Spinks in a different style match. Verichev made Spinks submit to a cross armbar in the third round to win the match.

=== Main event match ===
Atsushi Onita headlined his fourth straight Anniversary Show against Terry Funk in a no rope exploding barbed wire time bomb deathmatch. As the name suggested, the ring would explode after each fifteen minutes into the match. Onita delivered a Flowing Snap DDT to Funk for the win just nearly four minutes within the explosion of the entire ring. Onita left the ring when thirty seconds were left but Funk was unable to move due to his injury and then Onita put himself on Funk to take the blast and the two embraced after the match.

== Reception ==
The 4th Anniversary Show was a huge success for FMW as the key attraction of the event was the main event match between Atsushi Onita and Terry Funk, which drew a crowd of 41,000, the biggest for FMW until then and the event brought a revenue of $1,800,000.

4th Anniversary Show received mixed reviews from Ryan Mencuso of Puroresu Central. He rated the event 5.5 stars. He considered it "a two match show" rating the interpromotional match of Kudo and Toyoda vs. Toyota and Yamada "the high quality of match that fans expect from those 4 ladies" and called the Onita vs. Funk main event "a great spectacle to watch", with "The worked shoot matches were really bad. The six-man barbed wire match wasn't good, but it could have also been much worse. Everything else was clipped into pieces. The Michinoku Pro six man tag looked really fun. In the end, Toyota & Yamada vs. Kudo & Toyoda along with Funk vs. Onita are the only things worth checking out from this show. If you haven't seen those two matches, then this show is worth watching. If you have, then don't bother getting this show."

== Aftermath ==
Following his win over Terry Funk, Atsushi Onita resumed his rivalry with Team Canada. In the summer of 1993, Mr. Pogo left W*ING and returned to FMW and restarted his feud with Onita. At Summer Spectacular, on August 22, Onita defeated Pogo to replace the WWA World Martial Arts Heavyweight Championship with the FMW Brass Knuckles Heavyweight Championship. By the fall of the year, another W*ING wrestler Mitsuhiro Matsunaga defected to FMW and W*ING began declining which forced the promotion to close in 1994. Many of former W*ING wrestlers began feuding with Onita and formed W*ING Alliance with the mission of ending FMW. Onita began a rivalry with Genichiro Tenryu and took part in interpromotional matches between FMW and Tenryu's WAR to build momentum for Onita vs. Tenryu as the main event of the 5th Anniversary Show. Onita manipulated the crowd into attending the show by putting a retirement stipulation if he lost and he lost to Tenryu but then revealed that the retirement stipulation would be for May 5, 1995, a year later. Onita retired after defeating Hayabusa at the 6th Anniversary Show.

Megumi Kudo's alliance with Combat Toyoda began to break up after the 4th Anniversary Show due to Aja Kong's disrespect towards Toyoda causing jealousy between Toyoda and Kudo. On June 28, Kudo, Toyoda and Miwa Sato lost to Noriyo Tateno, Eriko Tsuchiya and Yoshika Maedomari after Tateno pinned Sato. Toyoda attacked Sato after the match and then Kudo tried to stop her but Toyoda attacked her as well and smashed a chair on Yukie Nabeno's head, prompting Kudo to attack Toyoda and Toyoda turned villain. She reunited with Tsuchiya and Maedomari to reform their Combat Army under the new name Mad Dog Military. On July 24, Toyoda defeated Kudo to win the WWA World Women's Championship.

== Results ==
No.	Results	Stipulations	Times
1	Eiji Ezaki defeated Koji Nakagawa	Singles match	10:03
2	Rie Nakamura defeated Keiko Iwame	Singles match	10:45
3	Eagle Sawai, Utako Ozumi, Yasha Kurenai, Midori Saito and Mikiko Futagami defeated Combat Army Miwa Sato, Eriko Tsuchiya, Yoshika Maedomari, Kumiko Matsuda and Yukie Nabeno	Captain's Fall match	25:52
4	The Sheik and Sabu defeated Team Canada (Dr. Luther and Dr. Hannibal)	Tag team match	6:53
5	The Great Sasuke, Kendo and Battle Ranger Z defeated Super Delfin, Espanto IV and Espanto V	Six-man tag team match	20:22
6	Shinobu Kandori defeated Victoria Kazumiya via submission	Different Style Fight	5:18
7	Combat Toyoda and Megumi Kudo defeated Toshiyo Yamada and Manami Toyota	Tag team match	22:17
8	Team Canada (Ricky Fuji, Big Titan and The Gladiator) defeated Katsuji Ueda, The Great Punk and Tarzan Goto	Captain's Fall Losing Captain Leaves Town No Rope Barbed Wire Tornado Street Fight Deathmatch	9:31
9	Grigory Verichev defeated Leon Spinks via submission in 3rd round	Different Style Fight	2:09
10	Atsushi Onita defeated Terry Funk	No Rope Exploding Barbed Wire Time Bomb Deathmatch	12:14
