= FMW 5th Anniversary Show =

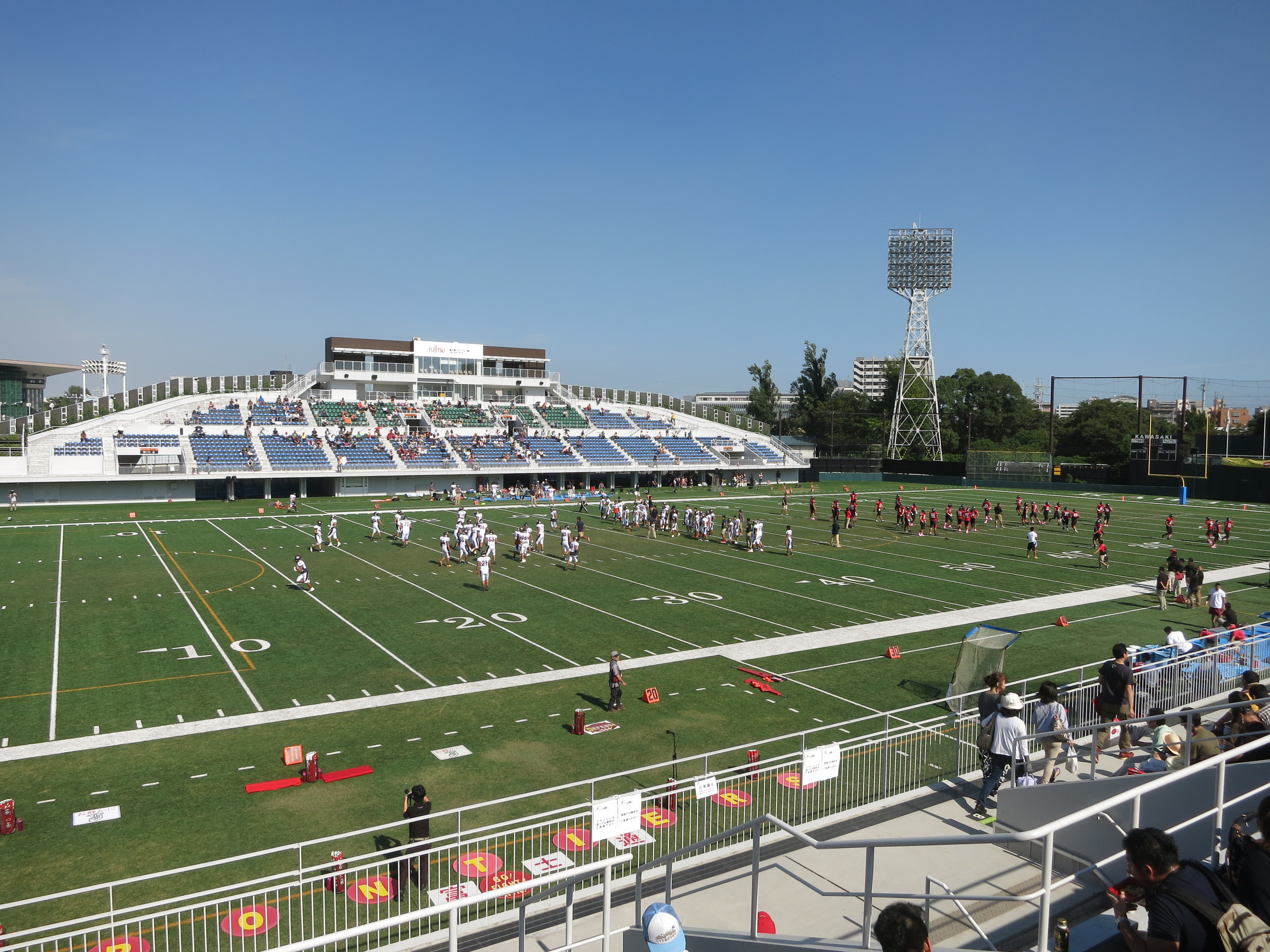
- Promotion: Frontier Martial-Arts Wrestling
- Date: May 5, 1994
- City: Kawasaki, Kanagawa, Japan
- Venue: Kawasaki Stadium
- Attendance: 52,000

Event chronology
← Previous; FMW/MPW	Next → FMW/LLPW/AJW

FMW Anniversary Show chronology
← Previous; 4th Anniversary	Next → 6th Anniversary

The FMW 5th Anniversary Show was a professional wrestling event produced by Frontier Martial-Arts Wrestling (FMW). The event took place on May 5, 1994 at the Kawasaki Stadium in Kawasaki, Kanagawa, Japan. This was the fifth edition of the company's flagship event Anniversary Show, commemorating the fifth anniversary of the company. It was the third edition of the event to take place at Kawasaki Stadium and took place on May 5 for the second consecutive year. May 5 would become a significant date for FMW like January 4 was for New Japan Pro-Wrestling (NJPW).

The main event was an interpromotional no rope exploding barbed wire deathmatch between FMW's ace Atsushi Onita and WAR's Genichiro Tenryu. Tenryu delivered a Powerbomb to win the match. The match stipulated that Onita would be forced to retire if he lost but he revealed that the retirement stipulation would be for the 6th Anniversary Show, a year later, where he truly retired.

== Background ==
On January 6, 1994, Mr. Pogo defeated Atsushi Onita in a street fight to win the FMW Brass Knuckles Heavyweight Championship. Despite Pogo being Onita's top rival in FMW, a new opponent was required for Onita at 5th Anniversary Show, so Onita began a rivalry with Genichiro Tenryu because Onita and Tenryu thought that a rivalry between both men could become a huge success for FMW and Tenryu's WAR and they planned to work interpromotional matches for each other. Onita and Tarzan Goto represented FMW against WAR's Tenryu and Ashura Hara in an interpromotional tag team match at WAR's Revolution Rumble event on March 2, 1994. Onita pinned Tenryu to set up a no rope exploding barbed wire deathmatch between Onita and Tenryu at 5th Anniversary Show. Onita announced that he would retire if he lost the match. Onita received a title shot against Pogo in a no rope barbed wire deathmatch on March 17, to make his match with Tenryu, a title match but failed to regain the title.

== Event ==
=== Preliminary matches ===
Tetsuhiro Kuroda faced Gosaku Goshogawara in the opening match of the event. Kuroda applied a one-legged Boston crab to win the match. Battle Ranger Z, Koji Nakagawa and Masato Tanaka represented FMW against MPW's The Great Sasuke, Hanzo Nakajima and Shiryu in an interpromotional match. Ranger performed a hyper tornado on Nakajima to win the match. Mad Dog Military represented FMW against LLPW's Eagle Sawai, Noriyo Tateno and Mitsuko Endo. Maedomari hit a crooked arm lariat to Endo for the win.

Sambo Asako and Mr. Gannosuke took on Goro Tsurumi and Hideki Hosaka in a tag team match. Gannosuke performed a Gannosuke Clutch on Hosaka to win the match for his team. Katsuji Ueda knocked out Katsutoshi Niiyama in the third round of a different style fight by knocking him out with a left straight punch.

Sabu and Damian defeated Dr. Luther and Yone Genjin in tag team action when Damian performed a Moonsault from the second rope on Genjin. Megumi Kudo made her first defense of the FMW Independent and WWA World Women's Championship against AJW's Yumiko Hotta. Kudo pinned Hotta with a cradle to retain the title.

Team Canada members Big Titan, The Gladiator and Ricky Fuji took on WAR representatives Fuyuki-Gun (Hiromichi Fuyuki, Jado and Gedo) in an interpromotional match. A miscommunication occurred between Gladiator and Big Titan and then Gladiator performed an Awesome Bomb on Gedo for the win and abandoned his partners. Terry Funk took on The Sheik with Funk gaining the win by knocking him out with a torch. Mr. Pogo and Hisakatsu Oya defended the FMW Brass Knuckles Tag Team Championship against Tarzan Goto and Mitsuhiro Matsunaga in a street fight. Oya performed a backdrop to Matsunaga to retain the title.

=== Main event match ===
Atsushi Onita participated in his fifth straight Anniversary Show main event against WAR's Genichiro Tenryu in a No Rope Exploding Barbed Wire Deathmatch with the stipulation that if Onita lost, he would retire from wrestling. Tenryu performed a Powerbomb to Onita to hand him his first defeat at the Anniversary Show. As per pre-match stipulation, Onita was forced to retire.

== Reception ==
The 5th Anniversary Show was the most successful event in FMW's history till 1994 as it surpassed the previous year's event in terms of revenue and audience. The epic main event encounter between Atsushi Onita and Genichiro Tenryu and the retirement stipulation of Onita sparked crowd interest into the event and the show drew a crowd of 52,000 and the company earned a revenue of $2,100,000.

== Aftermath ==
After his loss to Genichiro Tenryu, Atsushi Onita announced that the retirement stipulation was for the next year at the 6th Anniversary Show. He appeared with Tenryu in Tenryu's WAR promotion and they won the WAR 6-Man Tag Team Tournament with Crusher Bam Bam Bigelow at WAR's 2nd Anniversary of Revolution. Onita and Tenryu's friendship ended after that because Onita did not pay Tenryu his fair dues for his participation at 5th Anniversary Show. Onita then reverted his focus to regaining the Brass Knuckles Heavyweight Championship from Mr. Pogo. He regained the title on September 7 and then Yukihiro Kanemura made his FMW debut and attacked Onita after the match and formed W*ING Alliance with Pogo and Mitsuhiro Matsunaga. W*ING Alliance replaced Team Canada as the lead villainous group after Team Canada crippled due to dissension within teammates.

The breakup of Team Canada was confirmed after The Gladiator walked away on Big Titan and Ricky Fuji after their win over Fuyuki-Gun at 5th Anniversary Show. Gladiator began feuding with Big Titan and the two met in a match at Summer Spectacular, which Gladiator won. He would soon join Mr. Pogo in the W*ING Alliance.

Eiji Ezaki returned to FMW at Summer Spectacular to compete in his new "Hayabusa" character for the first time in FMW to test if the character could go well in FMW and defeated Sabu in the experimental match. He returned to the company at 6th Anniversary Show as Atsushi Onita's opponent in Onita's retirement match which Hayabusa lost but succeeded him as the company's ace.

Tarzan Goto once again turned on Atsushi Onita in 1995 and formed Lethal Weapon with W*ING Alliance member Hisakatsu Oya and former Team Canada member Ricky Fuji. He was chosen to succeed Onita as FMW's ace after Onita's retirement at 6th Anniversary Show but withdrew from the match and left FMW because he was booked to lose to Onita and did not want to lose to Onita again after putting him over every time they wrestled each other. Mr. Pogo did not agree due to not being approached first and Takashi Ishikawa was chosen for the position but Hayabusa was finalized since Ishikawa could not become a major draw for FMW.

Feeling betrayed at not getting a fair share of his job to Atsushi Onita at previous year's 4th Anniversary Show, Terry Funk left FMW after his victory over The Sheik at 5th Anniversary Show. Funk would return to FMW in 1996 as Mr. Pogo's partner against Hayabusa and Masato Tanaka in a No Ropes Exploding Barbed Wire Double Hell Exploding Deathmatch at the 7th Anniversary Show, where the winning team would receive one million yens and Funk's team won. Funk formed a dominant villainous stable called Funk Masters of Wrestling which dominated FMW for the next one year.

== Results ==
No.	Results	Stipulations	Times
1	Tetsuhiro Kuroda defeated Gosaku Goshogawara via submission	Singles match	9:28
2	Battle Ranger Z, Koji Nakagawa and Masato Tanaka defeated The Great Sasuke, Hanzo Nakajima and Shiryu	Six-man tag team match	18:49
3	Mad Dog Military (Combat Toyoda, Crusher Maedomari and Shark Tsuchiya) defeated Eagle Sawai, Noriyo Tateno and Mitsuko Endo	Six-woman tag team match	14:44
4	Sambo Asako and Mr. Gannosuke defeated Goro Tsurumi and Hideki Hosaka	Tag team match	12:24
5	Katsuji Ueda defeated Katsutoshi Niiyama via knockout in 3rd round	Different style match	1:43
6	Sabu and Damian defeated Dr. Luther and Yone Genjin	Tag team match	15:14
7	Megumi Kudo (c) defeated Yumiko Hotta	Singles match for the FMW Independent and WWA World Women's Championship	16:48
8	Team Canada (Big Titan, The Gladiator and Ricky Fuji) defeated Fuyuki-Gun (Hiromichi Fuyuki, Jado and Gedo)	Six-man tag team match	15:06
9	Terry Funk defeated The Sheik w/ Sabu by knockout	Singles match	5:59
10	Mr. Pogo and Hisakatsu Oya (c) defeated Tarzan Goto and Mitsuhiro Matsunaga	Street Fight for the FMW Brass Knuckles Tag Team Championship	16:30
11	Genichiro Tenryu defeated Atsushi Onita	No Rope Exploding Barbed Wire Deathmatch	23:55
(c) / – the champion(s) heading into the match
