= FMW 6th Anniversary Show =

1995 professional wrestling event

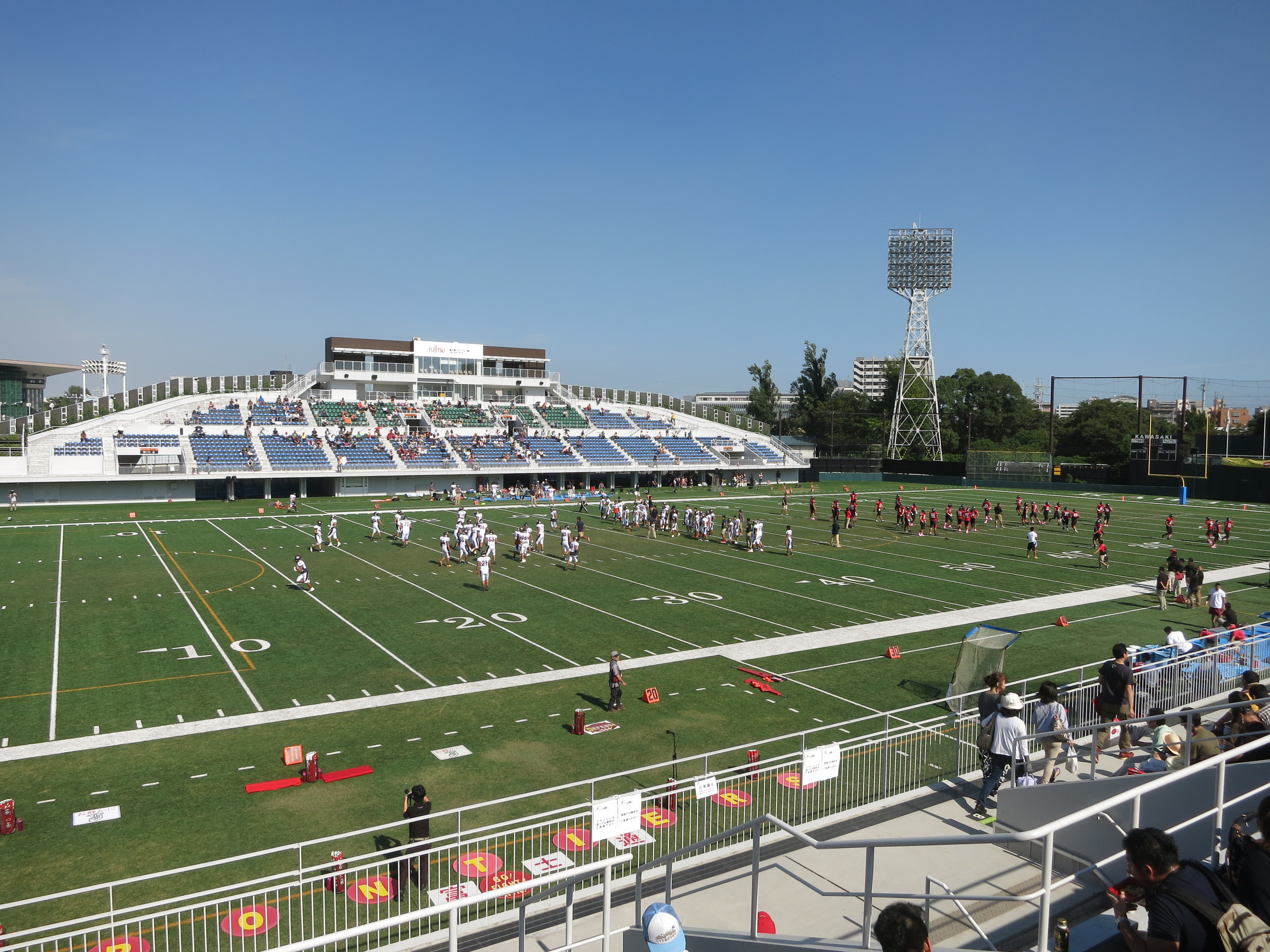
- Promotion: Frontier Martial-Arts Wrestling
- Date: May 5, 1995
- City: Kawasaki, Kanagawa, Japan
- Venue: Kawasaki Stadium
- Attendance: 58,250

Event chronology
← Previous; Summer Spectacular	Next → Year End Spectacular

FMW Anniversary Show chronology
← Previous; 5th Anniversary	Next → 7th Anniversary

FMW 6th Anniversary Show was a professional wrestling event produced by Frontier Martial-Arts Wrestling (FMW), taking place on May 5, 1995 at the Kawasaki Stadium in Kawasaki, Kanagawa, Japan. This was the sixth edition of the company's flagship event Anniversary Show, commemorating the sixth anniversary of the company and the third consecutive and fourth overall edition of Anniversary Show at Kawasaki Stadium.

The main event was a heavily-hyped no rope exploding barbed wire deathmatch between Atsushi Onita and Hayabusa for Onita's FMW Brass Knuckles Heavyweight Championship and it was billed as Onita's retirement match. Onita defeated Hayabusa to retain the title. The event and the match itself was significant in FMW's history as Onita retired from wrestling after the match and passed the torch to Hayabusa as the company's new ace. This was Onita's final Anniversary Show main event. The show was also notable for featuring deathmatch wrestling legend The Sheik's last record wrestling match in which he defeated Damian 666, who wrestled twice at the event.

== Background ==
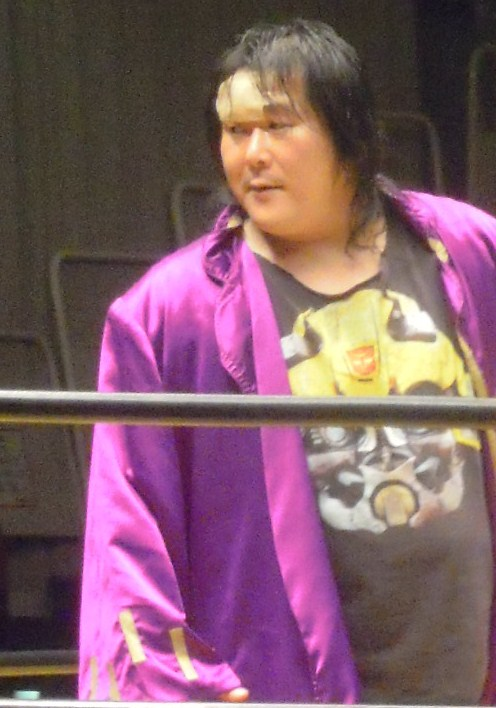
Kintaro Kanemura's arrival in FMW was one of the key elements in the formation of W*ING Alliance.

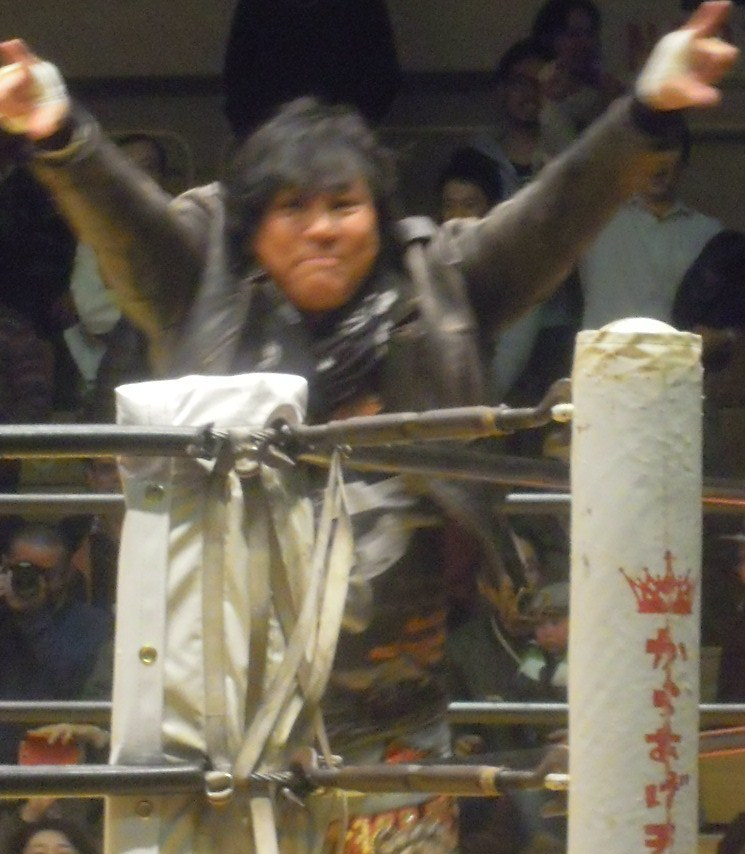
FMW founder Atsushi Onita wrestled his last match in FMW at 6th Anniversary Show.

The 6th Anniversary Show revolved around Atsushi Onita's retirement match, who was forced to retire after losing to Genichiro Tenryu at 5th Anniversary Show. However, after the match, Onita revealed that the retirement stipulation would be for the next year at the 6th Anniversary Show and began his retirement tour for the next full year. He battled W*ING Alliance throughout the year, which had been formed by Mr. Pogo, Yukihiro Kanemura and Mitsuhiro Matsunaga, all former W*ING wrestlers in 1994. He lost the FMW Brass Knuckles Heavyweight Championship to Pogo's alter ego Pogo Daiyo (English: King Pogo) on January 21, 1995. Onita needed an opponent for his retirement at the 6th Anniversary Show, who could succeed him as FMW's ace and his on-and-off ally and rival Tarzan Goto challenged him to be his opponent in early 1995. On February 6, 1995, Goto defeated Hisakatsu Oya for turning on him on September 25, 1994 to join W*ING Alliance. On February 24, Goto formed Lethal Weapon with Oya and Ricky Fuji to become the lead villainous stable of FMW. However, conspiracy transpired as Goto was never considered a major draw for FMW and the decision of Goto putting over Onita again at 6th Anniversary Show led Goto and his trainees Mr. Gannosuke and Flying Kid Ichihara to no-show April 21 show and leave FMW to join rival IWA Japan. Pogo, the reigning Brass Knuckles Heavyweight Champion and Onita's top rival at the time was then chosen to be Onita's opponent and FMW's next ace but declined the offer due to not being approached first and not accepting to be a substitute. Onita initially picked Takashi Ishikawa for the spot but Ishikawa was not generally accepted by the audience for not being a good wrestler to lead FMW and then Hayabusa, the former FMW's preliminary talent Eiji Ezaki, who was scheduled to make his full-time return to FMW at 6th Anniversary Show, stepped in to challenge Onita for the match at a press conference by Onita on April 30. Onita was initially reluctant but Hayabusa insisted on it and Ishikawa stepped down from the match, leading to Hayabusa being chosen as Onita's opponent. On May 1, Onita used his alter ego "The Great Nita" for the last time in a six-man tag team match and then defeated Pogo to win the Brass Knuckles Heavyweight Championship on May 4, just one day shy of 6th Anniversary Show, to make his retirement match with Hayabusa, a title match.

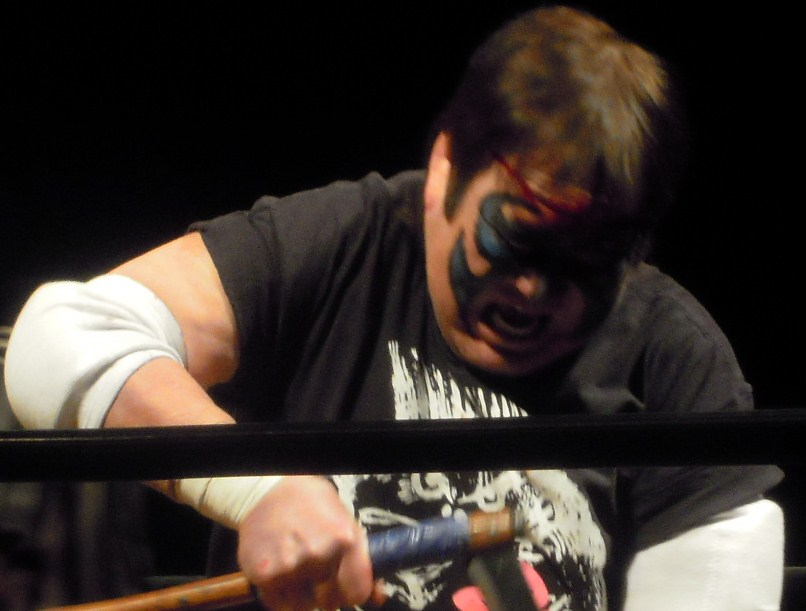
Mr. Pogo was one of the choices to be Atsushi Onita's opponent retirement match and his successor as FMW's ace but Pogo refused it for not being approached first.

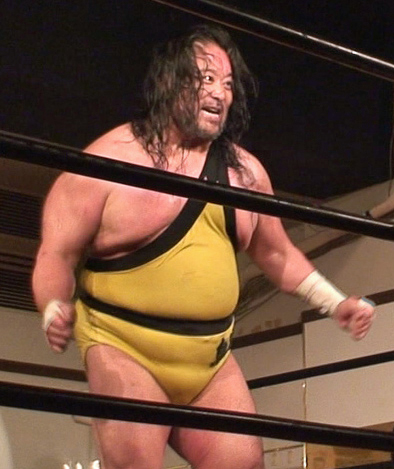
Tarzan Goto was the first choice to be Atsushi Onita's opponent at 6th Anniversary Show but no-showed a FMW event in April and left the company due to having to job to Onita again.

At Summer Spectacular on August 28, 1994, Yukie Nabeno defeated Combat Toyoda to win the FMW Independent and WWA World Women's Championship while Tsuppari Mack and Mad Dog Military's Shark Tsuchiya and Crusher Maedomari defeated Megumi Kudo, Miwa Sato and Bad Nurse Nakamura. On September 7, the team of Nabeno, Sato and Kudo lost to Mad Dog Military (Combat Toyoda, Shark Tsuchiya and Crusher Maedomari) after Tsuchiya stole the pinfall from Toyoda, which led to Toyoda and Tsuchiya coming to blows with each other and Toyoda left Mad Dog Military to turn fan favorite. On December 9, the team of Nabeno, Kudo and Toyoda lost to Tsuchiya, Maedomari and Mack after which Nabeno suffered a severe injury, forcing her to vacate the titles. On February 6, 1995, Kudo, Toyoda and Nurse Nakamura defeated Tsuchiya, Maedomari and new Mad Dog Military member Killer Iwami. After the match, Nakamura joined Mad Dog Military and changed her character to "Bad Nurse Nakamura". Nakamura defeated Kudo on March 30 to win the vacant Women's Championship, with the help of Mad Dog Military and cut Kudo's hair after the match. On April 21, Kudo wore camouflage to declare war on Mad Dog Military, leading to a rematch against Nakamura for the title at 6th Anniversary Show.

On October 28, 1994, Mr. Pogo and The Gladiator from W*ING defeated FMW's Atsushi Onita and Mr. Gannosuke to win the FMW Brass Knuckles Tag Team Championship. They lost the title to Onita and Gannosuke on February 24, 1995 but Pogo and Yukihiro Kanemura regained the title on March 7. During this time, Hisakatsu Oya broke away from W*ING and became a founding member of Lethal Weapon with Tarzan Goto and Ricky Fuji on February 24. Lethal Weapon began feuding with W*ING and Goto left FMW on April 23 leading to Pogo and Kanemura defending the Brass Knuckles Tag Team Championship against Oya and Fuji at 6th Anniversary Show.

== Event ==
=== Preliminary matches ===
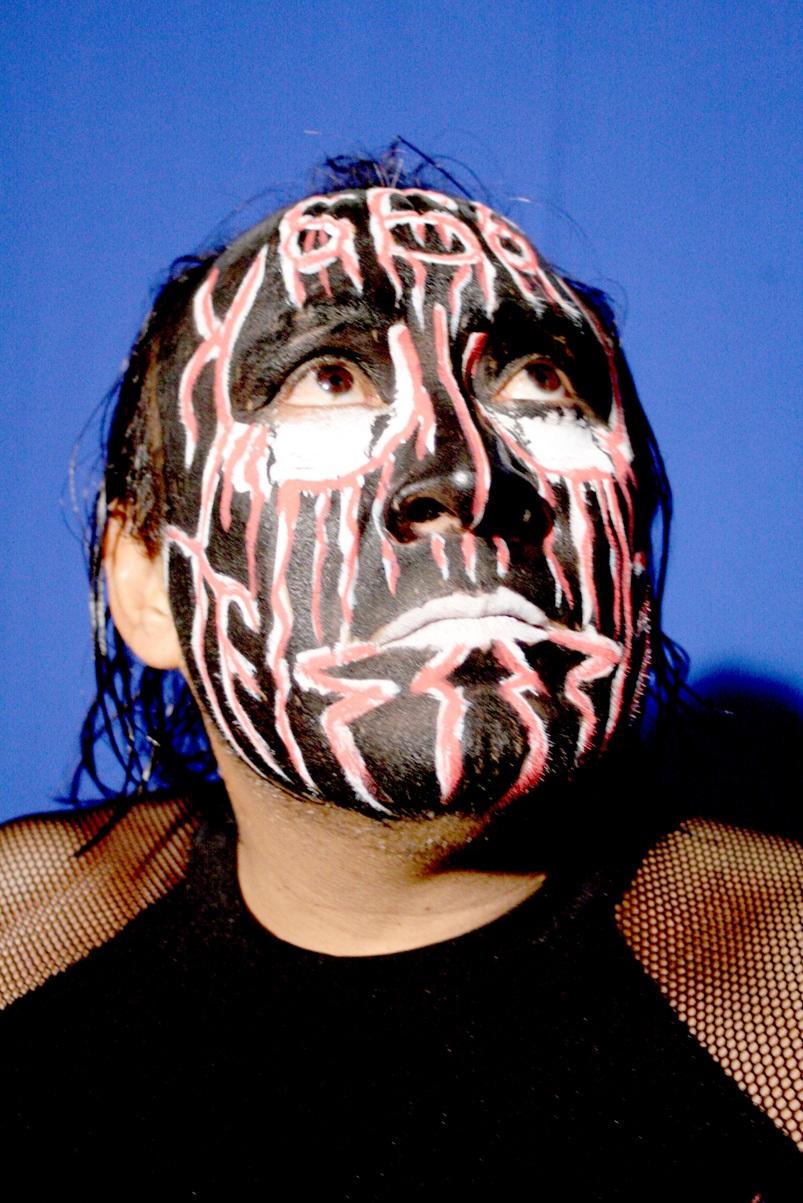
Leonardo Carrera Gomez wrestled two matches at the event under different characters, first as Amigo Ultra and second as Damian. He was The Sheik's last opponent.

In the opening match of the event, Rikio Ito defeated Gosaku Goshogawara by performing a Thunder Fire Powerbomb and a body press. The second match was a different style fight between Katsuji Ueda and Tetsuhiro Kuroda, which Ueda won by knocking out Kuroda with a left punch in the third round. Amigo Ultra and Ultra Taro defeated Battle Ranger Z and Mach Hayato when Ultra performed a muscle buster on Hayato.

Combat Toyoda, Miwa Sato and Yukari Ishikawa took on Crusher Maedomari, Shark Tsuchiya and Kaori Nakayama in a street fight. Tsuchiya knocked out Ishikawa with a Tsuchi Bomb to win the match.

Judge Dread and Koji Nakagawa defeated Tokyo Pro Wrestling's Ryo Miyake and Dunktane after Dread performed a splash on Miyake in the corner. The Sheik defeated Damian, who competed in his second match of the event, having wrestled as "Amigo Ultra" earlier at the event.

Takashi Ishikawa, Apollo Sagawa and Kishin Kawabata defeated W*ING Alliance members Mitsuhiro Matsunaga, Hideki Hosaka and Hido when Ishikawa made Hido submit to a Sumopion Deathlock.

Bad Nurse Nakamura defended the FMW Independent and WWA World Women's Championship against Megumi Kudo. Mad Dog Military interfered in the match on Nakamura's behalf causing Kudo to bleed. Nakamura dominated the match and performed a kneeling reverse piledriver and a piledriver on a steel chair but Kudo managed to kick out of the pinfall. Kudo threw powder in Nakamura's face to blind her and used a chain and followed it with a Kudo Driver to win the title.

The Gladiator and Horace Boulder of W*ING took on Masato Tanaka and Katsutoshi Niiyama. Niiyama performed a German suplex on Gladiator to win the match. The next match featured W*ING members Mr. Pogo and Yukihiro Kanemura defend the FMW Brass Knuckles Tag Team Championship against Lethal Weapon members The Love Guns (Hisakatsu Oya and Ricky Fuji). During the match, a miscommunication occurred between Pogo and Kanemura, allowing Hisakatsu Oya to perform a backdrop on Kanemura to win the title. After the match, Pogo blew a fireball at Kanemura for the loss.

=== Main event match ===
Atsushi Onita defended the FMW Brass Knuckles Heavyweight Championship against Hayabusa in a No Rope Exploding Barbed Wire Deathmatch, which would be Onita's last match after which he would retire. Near the end of the match, Hayabusa attempted to perform a Moonsault on Onita from the top of the steel cage but Onita moved out of the way and then performed a Thunder Fire Powerbomb on Hayabusa but Hayabusa managed to kick out of the pinfall attempt. Onita performed the move twice to retain the title and win his retirement match. Following the match, Onita showed respect to his opponent by pouring water on him to wake him up.

== Reception ==
The 6th Anniversary Show was a huge success and became the most successful event of FMW of all time. The retirement of Atsushi Onita sparked huge crowd interest because his loyal fans wanted to see him compete in his last match and it drew a record attendance of 58,250, the biggest in the history of FMW. It earned the company $2,500,000.

== Aftermath ==
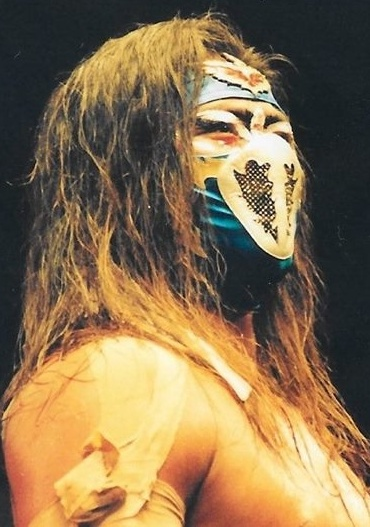
Hayabusa wrestled Atsushi Onita in his retirement match and ultimately became his successor and led the company as its ace throughout his career.

Atsushi Onita vacated the FMW Brass Knuckles Heavyweight Championship due to his retirement. Following his retirement, Hayabusa took over as FMW's ace under the ownership of Shoichi Arai, who Onita sold the company before retiring and the entire focus had been Onita throughout FMW's existence till then and the company switched to focusing on the younger talent. A Young Spirit Tournament was held to recognize the younger talent, which Masato Tanaka won by defeating W*ING Kanemura. On June 27, Hayabusa defeated Hisakatsu Oya to win the vacant Brass Knuckles Heavyweight Championship for the first time in his career but vacated immediately due to injury. He participated in the Grand Slam Tournament, which he ended up losing to The Gladiator in the final.

Megumi Kudo enjoyed a lengthy reign as FMW Independent and WWA World Women's Champion, before dropping the title to Shark Tsuchiya on November 20, 1995.

Mr. Pogo's attack on Yukihiro Kanemura at 6th Anniversary Show led to him to turn on W*ING and join Lethal Weapon with Hisakatsu Oya, Ricky Fuji and become the leader of the group. The Gladiator and Horace Boulder also turned on W*ING to join the group as well and Lethal Weapon replaced W*ING as the top villainous group in FMW. In January 1996, Víctor Quiñones returned to FMW and formed Puerto Rican Army which became the top villainous group of FMW and crippled Lethal Weapon and W*ING by luring away their top members into the group. Hayabusa and Masato Tanaka, the leaders of FMW's new generation took on Puerto Rican Army's Mr. Pogo and Terry Funk in a no rope explosive barbed wire time bomb land mine double hell death match at the 7th Anniversary Show, which Pogo and Funk won.

== Results ==
No.	Results	Stipulations	Times
1	Rikio Ito defeated Gosaku Goshogawara	Singles match	10:36
2	Katsuji Ueda defeated Tetsuhiro Kuroda via knockout in 3rd round	Different Style Fight	7:36
3	Amigo Ultra and Ultra Taro defeated Battle Ranger Z and Mach Hayato	Tag team match	15:17
4	Mad Dog Military (Crusher Maedomari and Shark Tsuchiya) and Kaori Nakayama defeated Combat Toyoda, Miwa Sato and Yukari Ishikawa	Street Fight	16:27
5	Judge Dread and Koji Nakagawa defeated Ryo Miyake and Dunktane	Tag team match	14:26
6	The Sheik defeated Damian	Singles match	1:47
7	Takashi Ishikawa, Apollo Sagawa and Kishin Kawabata defeated Mitsuhiro Matsunaga, Hideki Hosaka and Hido	Six-man tag team match	12:35
8	Megumi Kudo defeated Bad Nurse Nakamura (c)	Singles match for the FMW Independent and WWA World Women's Championship	14:32
9	Katsutoshi Niiyama and Masato Tanaka defeated Horace Boulder and The Gladiator	Tag team match	10:25
10	The Love Guns (Hisakatsu Oya and Ricky Fuji) defeated Mr. Pogo and W*ING Kanemura (c)	Tag team match for the FMW Brass Knuckles Tag Team Championship	12:45
11	Atsushi Onita (c) defeated Hayabusa	No Rope Exploding Barbed Wire Deathmatch for the FMW Brass Knuckles Heavyweight Championship	18:11
(c) / – the champion(s) heading into the match
