= Summer Spectacular (1993) =

Professional wrestling event in Japan

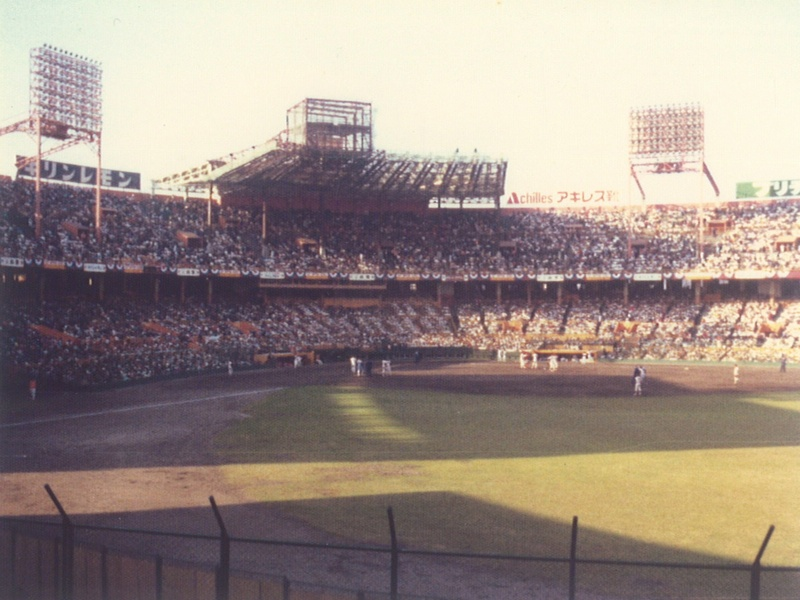
- Promotion: Frontier Martial-Arts Wrestling
- Date: August 22, 1993
- City: Nishinomiya, Hyōgo, Japan
- Venue: Hankyu Nishinomiya Stadium
- Attendance: 36,223

Event chronology
| ← Previous; FMW 4th Anniversary Show | Next → Year End Spectacular |

Summer Spectacular chronology
| ← Previous; 1990 | Next → 1994 |

Summer Spectacular (1993) was the second Summer Spectacular professional wrestling event produced by Frontier Martial-Arts Wrestling (FMW). The event took place on August 22, 1993 at the Hankyu Nishinomiya Stadium in Nishinomiya, Hyōgo, Japan.

Thirteen matches were contested at the event. In the main event, Atsushi Onita defeated Mr. Pogo in a no ropes exploding barbed wire time bomb cage deathmatch to win the new FMW Brass Knuckles Heavyweight Championship, which replaced the WWA World Martial Arts Heavyweight Championship.

== Background ==
Mr. Pogo left W*ING as FMW had offered him an annual salary of $120,000, and he returned to FMW in June 1993 by attacking Atsushi Onita after a match and then quickly escaped in a car. The two men renewed their rivalry and Pogo joined Team Canada. On July 16, Pogo made his in-ring return to FMW with Big Titan and The Gladiator against Onita, Sambo Asako and Tarzan Goto in a street fight, which Pogo's team won. Onita defeated Pogo in a no ropes exploding barbed wire double hell deathmatch on July 24, which was the first singles encounter between the two since 1991 and a rematch was set up between the two at Summer Spectacular. Onita vacated his WWA World Martial Arts Heavyweight Championship as FMW's martial arts style had ended and FMW completely shifted to deathmatch wrestling style. Martial arts was limited only to kickboxer Katsuji Ueda's exhibition matches. The title was replaced by the FMW Brass Knuckles Heavyweight Championship, which would represent FMW's deathmatch competition and the title would be decided in Onita and Pogo's match. Onita combined his barbed wire cage match against Tarzan Goto from the 2nd Anniversary Show and the exploding ring time bomb stipulation against Terry Funk from the 4th Anniversary Show to make the first-ever no ropes exploding ring barbed wire time bomb cage deathmatch against Pogo at Summer Spectacular.

== Event ==
=== Preliminary matches ===
In the opening match, Masato Tanaka defeated the aging 60-year old Mr. Chin with a cradle.

Koji Nakagawa took on Chiaki Matsuyama in a very quick match which ended when Nakagawa applied a half Boston crab on Matsuyama for the submission victory.

The team of Kumiko Matsuda, Keiko Iwami and Nurse Nakamura took on Mad Dog Military (Combat Toyoda, Shark Tsuchiya and Crusher Maedomari). After a lengthy match, Toyoda pinned Matsuda to win the match.

Little Frankie defeated Tomeko Tsunokake in a short match.

Ricky Fuji took on Mercenario in a match, which Fuji won by performing a diving headbutt.

Yasha Kurenai took on Yukie Nabeno, winning the match with a Chokeslam.

The team of Terry Boy and Atsushi Onita, Jr. took on The Cockroaches (#1 and #2) in a tag team action. Onita performed a hurricanrana on Cockroach #2 to win.

Megumi Kudo and Miwa Sato took on All Japan Women's Pro Wrestling's (AJW) Jungle Jack members Aja Kong and Kaoru Ito. Kong initially overpowered Kudo and almost knocked her out but Kudo managed to get up at the referee's count of 9 and then performed a Kudo Driver to win the match for FMW.

The Great Sasuke, Battle Ranger Z and TAKA Michinoku defeated Jinsei Shinzaki, Super Delfin and Gran Naniwa when Ranger performed a dragon suplex on Naniwa.

The team of Sambo Asako and Mr. Gannosuke took on Team Canada's Big Titan and The Gladiator. Both teams brawled all over the stadium and then continued to fight over a scaffold. Gannosuke pinned Gladiator with a Gannosuke Clutch.

Leon Spinks took on kickboxer Katsuji Ueda in a different style fight. After a back and forth contest, Ueda knocked out Spinks in the third round.

The Sheik and Sabu took on Terry Funk and Tarzan Goto. Near the end of the match, Funk performed a Piledriver to Sabu on a steel chair to knock Sabu out and get the win.

=== Main event match ===
Atsushi Onita took on Mr. Pogo in the first-ever no ropes exploding barbed wire time bomb cage deathmatch for the new FMW Brass Knuckles Heavyweight Championship. Pogo controlled the earlier part of the match by tossing Onita into the exploding cage and then carved his back with his sickle. Pogo attempted to throw a fireball into Onita but Onita moved out of it and the fire struck Pogo and then Onita tried to throw Pogo into the exploding cage but Pogo grabbed the referee Go Ito and both men fell into the cage and were knocked out with the explosions. Onita capitalized by performing two DDTs but Pogo still kicked out of the pinfall attempt and then Onita delivered a third DDT to win the title. After the match, the clock ticked and the ring exploded with Onita putting himself over Ito to protect Ito from getting blowed.

== Reception ==
Summer Spectacular was a huge success as the event drew a crowd of 36,223, breaking the highest attendance record of Osaka. The event earned the company a revenue of $1,600,000.

== Aftermath ==
Atsushi Onita and Mr. Pogo continued their feud after Summer Spectacular. Pogo gained more allies as Mitsuhiro Matsunaga and Hideki Hosaka left W*ING to join FMW and Hisakatsu Oya from Super World of Sports (SWS) also joined FMW as Pogo's ally. Onita defended the FMW Brass Knuckles Heavyweight Championship against Matsunaga in a No Ropes Exploding Barbed Wire Deathmatch at Year End Spectacular, with Onita retaining the title and then both men made peace with each other. Pogo ultimately defeated Onita to win the title on January 6, 1994.

== Results ==
| No. | Results | Stipulations | Times |
|---|---|---|---|
| 1 | Masato Tanaka defeated Mr. Chin | Singles match | 5:29 |
| 2 | Koji Nakagawa defeated Chiaki Matsuyama via submission | Singles match | 2:58 |
| 3 | Mad Dog Military (Combat Toyoda, Shark Tsuchiya and Crusher Maedomari) defeated Kumiko Matsuda, Keiko Iwami and Nurse Nakamura | Six-woman tag team match | 20:18 |
| 4 | Little Frankie defeated Tomezo Tsunokake | Singles match | 5:29 |
| 5 | Ricky Fuji defeated Mercurio | Singles match | 6:10 |
| 6 | Yasha Kurenai defeated Yukie Nabeno | Singles match | 8:50 |
| 7 | Terry Boy and Atsushi Onita, Jr. defeated The Cockroaches (#1 and #2) | Tag team match | 12:40 |
| 8 | Megumi Kudo and Miwa Sato defeated Jungle Jack (Aja Kong and Kaoru Ito) | Tag team match | 18:25 |
| 9 | The Great Sasuke, Battle Ranger Z and TAKA Michinoku defeated Jinsei Shinzaki, Super Delfin and Gran Naniwa | Six-man tag team match | 22:56 |
| 10 | Sambo Asako and Mr. Gannosuke defeated Big Titan and The Gladiator | Tag team match | 9:51 |
| 11 | Katsuji Ueda defeated Leon Spinks via knockout in third round | Different Style Fight | 6:43 |
| 12 | Terry Funk and Tarzan Goto defeated The Sheik and Sabu by knockout | Stretcher match | 6:32 |
| 13 | Atsushi Onita defeated Mr. Pogo | No Ropes Exploding Barbed Wire Time Bomb Cage Deathmatch for the vacant FMW Brass Knuckles Heavyweight Championship | 12:45 |
