= FMW 2nd Anniversary Show =

1991 professional wrestling event

FMW 2nd Anniversary Show: Fall Spectacular (1991)
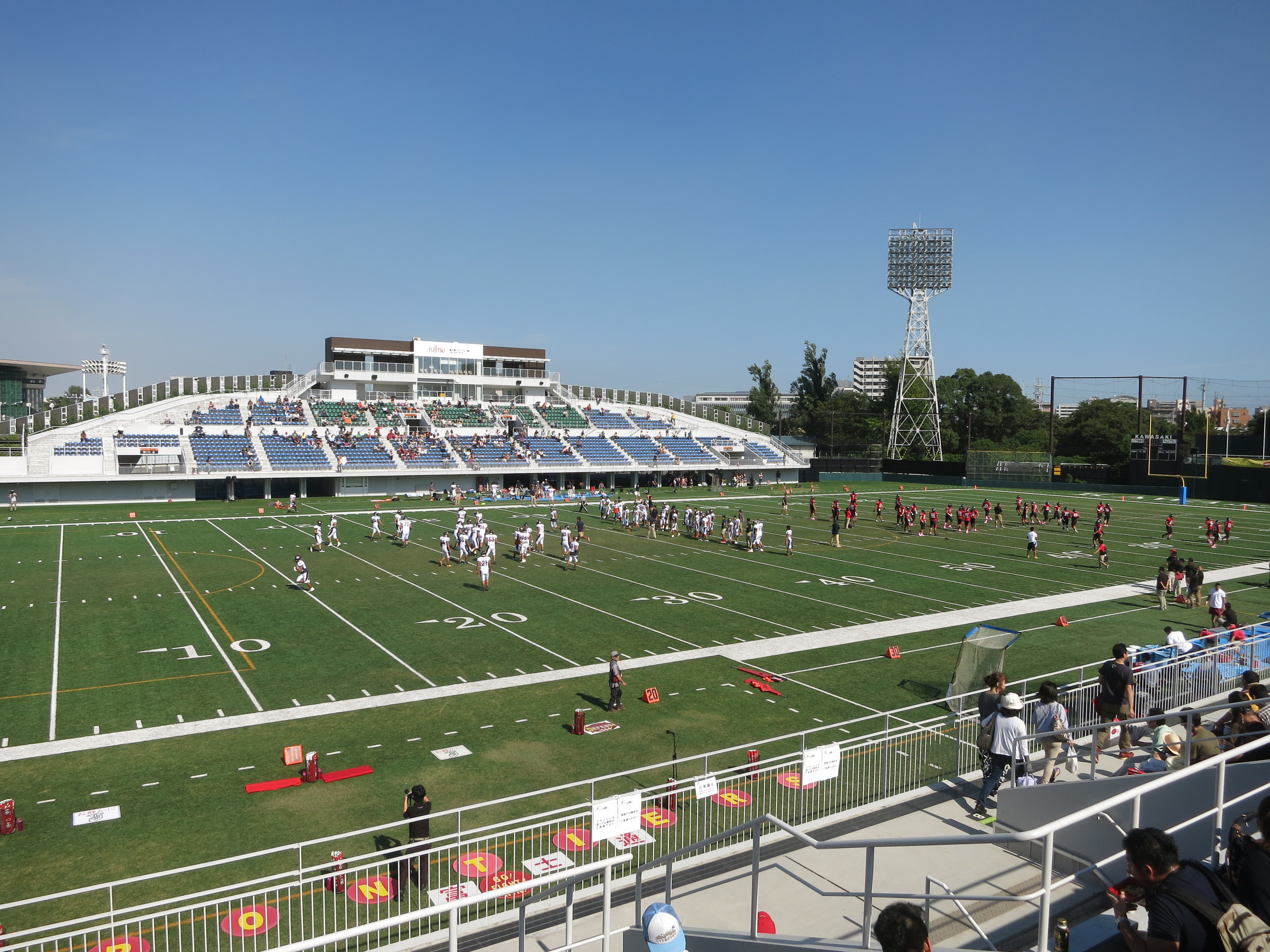
- Promotion: Frontier Martial-Arts Wrestling
- Date: September 23, 1991
- City: Kawasaki, Kanagawa, Japan
- Venue: Kawasaki Stadium
- Attendance: 33,000

Event chronology
| ← Previous; FMW 1st Anniversary Show | Next → FMW/WWA in Los Angeles |

FMW Anniversary Show chronology
| ← Previous; 1st Anniversary | Next → 3rd Anniversary |

Fall Spectacular chronology
| ← Previous; First | Next → 3rd Anniversary Show: Fall Spectacular |

FMW 2nd Anniversary Show: Fall Spectacular (1991) was a professional wrestling event produced by Frontier Martial-Arts Wrestling (FMW). The event took place on September 23, 1991 at the Kawasaki Stadium in Kawasaki, Kanagawa, Japan. This was FMW's first show at the venue and it would become a venue for FMW's future major events. This was the second edition of the company's flagship event Anniversary Show, commemorating the second anniversary of the company.

The main event was a no rope exploding barbed wire steel cage deathmatch between Atsushi Onita and Tarzan Goto, which Onita won after Goto was knocked out and failed to answer the referee's ten count.

== Background ==
=== Production ===
Atsushi Onita planned two major shows for FMW in the summer of 1991. The first show took place on August 17, 1991 at the Torisu Stadium in Tokyo, where FMW held a Barbed Wire Deathmatch Tournament, which Onita won. However, FMW had to split gates due to a concert taking place at the venue as well and FMW planned its next major show at the Kawasaki Stadium on September 23, marking the company's first show at Kawasaki Stadium.

=== Storylines ===
After having made peace at the 1990 Summer Spectacular, Atsushi Onita and Tarzan Goto resumed their rivalry with each other after Goto brutalized his opponent Sambo Asako in a Barbed Wire Deathmatch on June 21, 1991, forcing the referee to stop the match due to Asako injuring his arm badly. Goto continued the brutal assault and Onita angrily shouted at him for injuring Asako. On June 27, Goto turned into a villain by turning on his partner Ricky Fuji in a tag team match and became the rival of Fuji, Asako and Onita. On June 30, Goto teamed with Horace Boulder and The Gladiator to defeat Onita, Fuji and Asako in a street fight. Goto and Onita clashed in many tag team matches with different partners throughout the summer, leading to a match between the two at Fall Spectacular.

== Event ==
=== Preliminary matches ===
Eiji Ezaki defeated Masashi Honda in the opening match by delivering a Dropkick to Honda and then made him submit to a cross armbreaker.

Miwa Sato won an eight-woman battle royal by last eliminating Eriko Tsuchiya with a reverse achilles tendon hold.

Horace Boulder and The Shooter defeated Jimmy Backlund and Kim Hyun Han in a tag team match after Boulder performed an Axe Bomber on Han. Amigo Ultra, Akihito Ichihara and Ultramancito defeated El Pandita, Pandita Chiquita and Yukihide Ueno in a Six-man tag team match.

Combat Toyoda successfully defended the WWA World Women's Championship against Reggie Bennett in an Indian Strap Deathmatch by making her submit to a camel clutch by wrapping strap around her neck. Following the match, Svetlana Gundarenko defeated Megumi Kudo in the second consecutive women's match of the event by making her tap out to a cross armbreaker.

Big Titan and The Gladiator won the elimination street fight against their opponents Sambo Asako and Ricky Fuji when Gladiator first eliminated Asako by knockout and then Big Titan knocked out Fuji.

Grigory Verichev took on Katsuji Ueda in Ueda's speciality, a mixed style match. Verichev knocked out Ueda in the fifth round to win the match.

=== Main event match ===
Atsushi Onita faced Tarzan Goto in a no rope exploding barbed wire steel cage deathmatch. Near the end of the match, Onita performed a Thunder Fire Powerbomb on Goto to knock him out and Goto failed to answer the referee's ten count.

== Reception ==
The success of the 2nd Anniversary Show with a crowd of 33,000 people which earned FMW a $1,200,000 at the Kawasaki Stadium would pave the way for FMW to hold more shows at the stadium and the company signed a contract with Kawasaki Stadium to produce a major show at the venue every year on May 5, beginning with the 4th Anniversary Show on May 5, 1993, which drew a crowd out of 41,000 people due to the heavily hyped main event match between Atsushi Onita and Terry Funk.

== Aftermath ==
Atsushi Onita and Tarzan Goto ended their rivalry and made peace after their match at 2nd Anniversary Show, which caused Goto to revert to being a fan favorite. Onita and Goto paired together to participate in the World's Strongest Tag Team Tournament in the fall of 1991 for the new WWA World Martial Arts Tag Team Championship, which they won. Onita headlined his third straight Anniversary Show at the 3rd Anniversary Show in the following year against Tiger Jeet Singh at the Yokohama Arena in Yokohama, drawing a crowd of 30,000 people.

Eiji Ezaki and Masashi Honda's popularity began to increase after their opening match at 2nd Anniversary Show and they started becoming successful in the company as Onita picked them to be the major stars. Ezaki would be sent to Mexico to learn the high-flying lucha libre style and Honda was repackaged as "Mr. Gannosuke" due to his resemblance with actor Ashiya Gannosuke. Gannosuke was quickly pushed to compete in the main event matches while Ezaki remained in the undercard. Ezaki would develop a character named "Hayabusa", which would become extremely popular and successful. He succeeded Onita as the company's ace after losing to Onita in Onita's retirement match at 6th Anniversary Show in 1995. Hayabusa and Gannosuke's rivalry would become one of FMW's long lasting rivalries and the two competed in many major matches.

== Results ==
| No. | Results | Stipulations | Times |
|---|---|---|---|
| 1 | Eiji Ezaki defeated Masashi Honda via submission | Singles match | 7:22 |
| 2 | Miwa Sato won by last eliminating Eriko Tsuchiya (Note: The other participants were Keiko Iwami, Kumiko Matsuda, Rie Nakamura, Yoshika Maedomari, Yuki Morimatsu and Yukie Nabeno.) | Women's Battle Royal | 10:11 |
| 3 | Horace Boulder and The Shooter defeated Jimmy Backlund and Kim Hyun Han | Tag team match | 12:48 |
| 4 | Amigo Ultra, Akihito Ichihara and Ultramancito defeated El Pandita, Pandita Chiquita and Yukihide Ueno | Six-man tag team match | 11:19 |
| 5 | Combat Toyoda (c) defeated Reggie Bennett | Indian Strap Deathmatch for the WWA World Women's Championship | 11:36 |
| 6 | Svetlana Goundarenko defeated Megumi Kudo | Singles match | 9:56 |
| 7 | Big Titan and The Gladiator defeated Sambo Asako and Ricky Fuji | Elimination Street Fight | 11:12 |
| 8 | Grigory Verichev defeated Katsuji Ueda by knockout in 5th round | Mixed style match | 1:44 |
| 9 | Atsushi Onita defeated Tarzan Goto by knockout | No Rope Exploding Barbed Wire Steel Cage Deathmatch | 16:01 |
(c) / – the champion(s) heading into the match
