= Year End Spectacular (1995) =

Professional wrestling event in Yokohama, Japan

- Promotion: Frontier Martial-Arts Wrestling
- Date: Taping: December 21, 1995; Airing: January 26, 1996
- City: Yokohama, Kanagawa, Japan
- Venue: Bunka Gym
- Attendance: 2,500

Event chronology
← Previous; FMW 6th Anniversary Show	Next → Yamato Nadeshiko II

Year End Spectacular chronology
← Previous; 1993	Next → 1996

Year End Spectacular (1995) was the second Year End Spectacular professional wrestling event produced by Frontier Martial-Arts Wrestling (FMW). The event took place on December 21, 1995, at the Bunka Gym in Yokohama, Kanagawa, Japan. The event aired as a television special on Gaora TV on January 26, 1996.

The main event was a mixed match between FMW and Michinoku Pro Wrestling as the team of Hayabusa, The Great Sasuke and Koji Nakagawa defeated Super Delfin, Ricky Fuji and TAKA Michinoku. The other major match on the card was a Caribbean Barbed Wire Double Hell Glass Death Match between members of the W*ING Alliance as Mitsuhiro Matsunaga, Jason the Terrible and Hideki Hosaka defeated Super Leather, W*ING Kanemura and Hido.

== Event ==
=== Preliminary matches ===
Gekko defeated Gosaku Goshogawara in the opening match of the event by performing a fisherman suplex.

Kaori Nakayama and Miwa Sato competed in the first joshi match of the event, which Nakayama won by pinning Sato with a cradle.

Bad Nurse Nakamura defeated Yukari Ishikawa with a STF.

Katsutoshi Niiyama took on Tetsuhiro Kuroda in a match, which Niiyama won by performing a Uranage.

The Fujiwara Gumi team of Daisuke Ikeda and Yoshiaki Fujiwara defended the FMW Brass Knuckles Tag Team Championship against Lethal Weapon members Hisakatsu Oya and Horace Boulder. Near the end of the match, Oya performed a backdrop suplex on Ikeda to win the title.

Masato Tanaka of the FMW team took on Lethal Weapon's Mr. Pogo. Pogo knocked out Tanaka by hanging him with a chain.

Megumi Kudo and Aja Kong took on Combat Toyoda and Bison Kimura in a match, which Kudo and Kong won after Kudo performed a sunset flip powerbomb on Toyoda to win the match.

The W*ING Alliance members competed against each other in a Caribbean Barbed Wire Double Hell Glass Death Match as Mitsuhiro Matsunaga, Jason the Terrible and Hideki Hosaka took on Super Leather, W*ING Kanemura and Hido. Near the end of the match, Kanemura would be thrown into the barbed wire glass outside of the ring, and tortured by forcing to lay in it while Hosaka and Jason continued to kick his body around in the glass. Jason performed a Northern Lights Bomb on Hido to win the match.

=== Main event match ===
The main event match was a six-man tag team match involving wrestlers from FMW and Michinoku Pro Wrestling (MPW), in which the team of Hayabusa, The Great Sasuke and Koji Nakagawa took on Super Delfin, Ricky Fuji and TAKA Michinoku. Hayabusa performed a Phoenix Splash on Fuji to win the match.

== Results ==
No.	Results	Stipulations	Times
1	Gekko defeated Gosaku Goshogawara	Singles match	3:00
2	Kaori Nakayama defeated Miwa Sato	Singles match	7:18
3	Bad Nurse Nakamura defeated Yukari Ishikawa via submission	Singles match	6:09
4	Katsutoshi Niiyama defeated Tetsuhiro Kuroda	Singles match	9:40
5	Lethal Weapon (Hisakatsu Oya and Horace Boulder) defeated Yoshiaki Fujiwara and Daisuke Ikeda (c)	Tag team match for the FMW Brass Knuckles Tag Team Championship	17:38
6	Mr. Pogo defeated Masato Tanaka via knockout	Singles match	19:19
7	Aja Kong and Megumi Kudo defeated Bison Kimura and Combat Toyoda	Tag team match	22:30
8	Mitsuhiro Matsunaga, Jason the Terrible and Hideki Hosaka defeated Super Leather, W*ING Kanemura and Hido	W*ING Caribbean Barbed Wire Double Hell Glass Death Match	14:42
9	Hayabusa, The Great Sasuke and Koji Nakagawa defeated Super Delfin, Ricky Fuji and TAKA Michinoku	Six-man tag team match	17:44
(c) / – the champion(s) heading into the match
