= Summer Spectacular (1994) =

Professional wrestling event in Japan

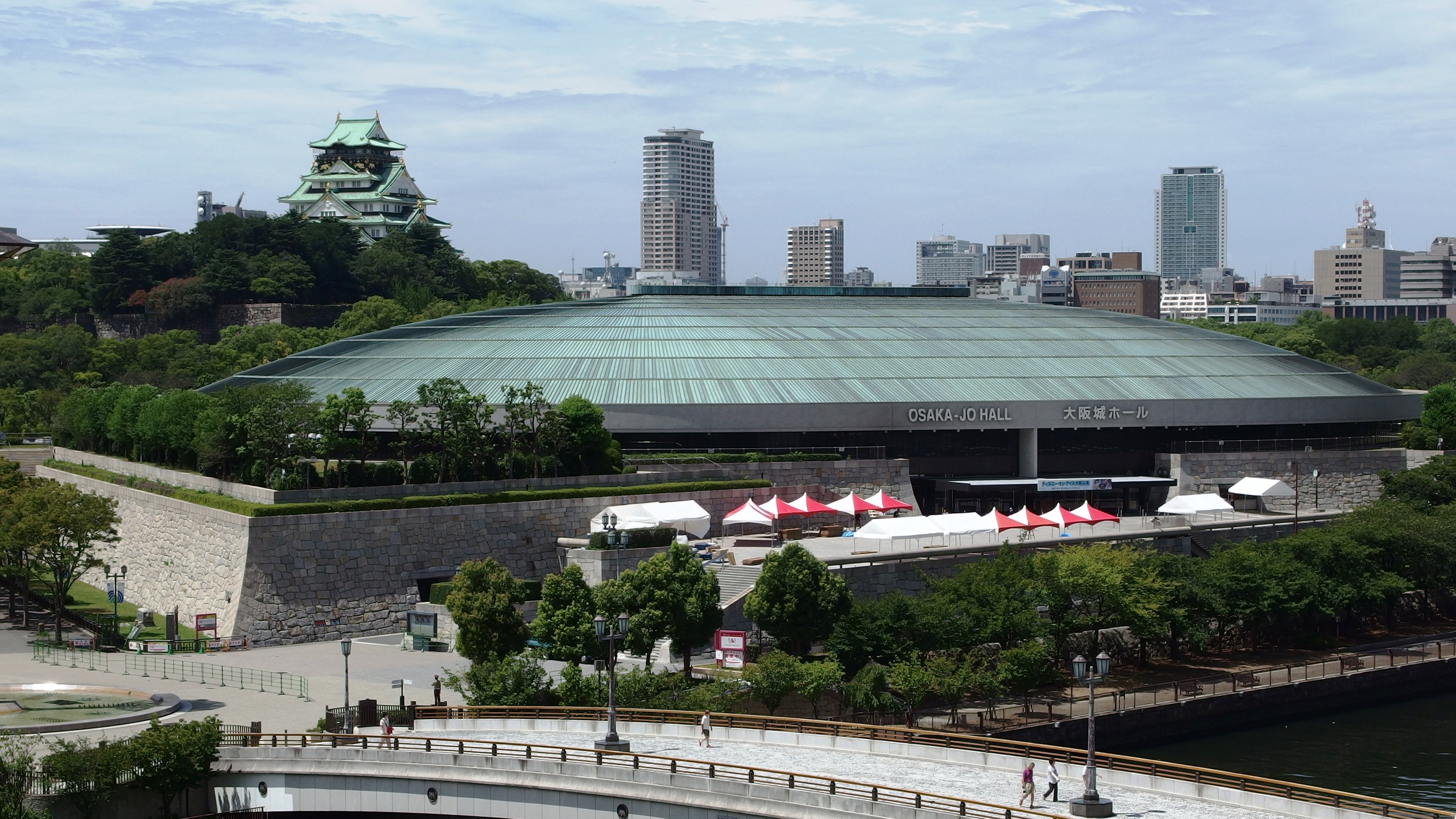
- Promotion: Frontier Martial-Arts Wrestling
- Date: August 28, 1994
- City: Osaka, Japan
- Venue: Osaka-jō Hall
- Attendance: 15,382

Event chronology
← Previous; FMW/LLPW/AJW	Next → FMW 6th Anniversary Show

Summer Spectacular chronology
← Previous; 1993	Next → 1996

Summer Spectacular (1994) was the third Summer Spectacular professional wrestling event produced by Frontier Martial-Arts Wrestling (FMW). The event took place on August 28, 1994 at the Osaka-jō Hall in Osaka, Japan.

Eleven matches were contested at the event. The main event featured Atsushi Onita taking on his longtime rival Masashi Aoyagi in a no ropes electrified explosive barbed wire barricade double hell match. Onita won the match by knocking out Aoyagi. Another important match on the event was a street fight deathmatch between Mr. Pogo and Mitsuhiro Matsunaga, which Pogo won. The event also marked Eiji Ezaki's return to FMW after having worked in Mexico and his first match in FMW as Hayabusa, in which he took on Sabu in a winning effort.

== Background ==
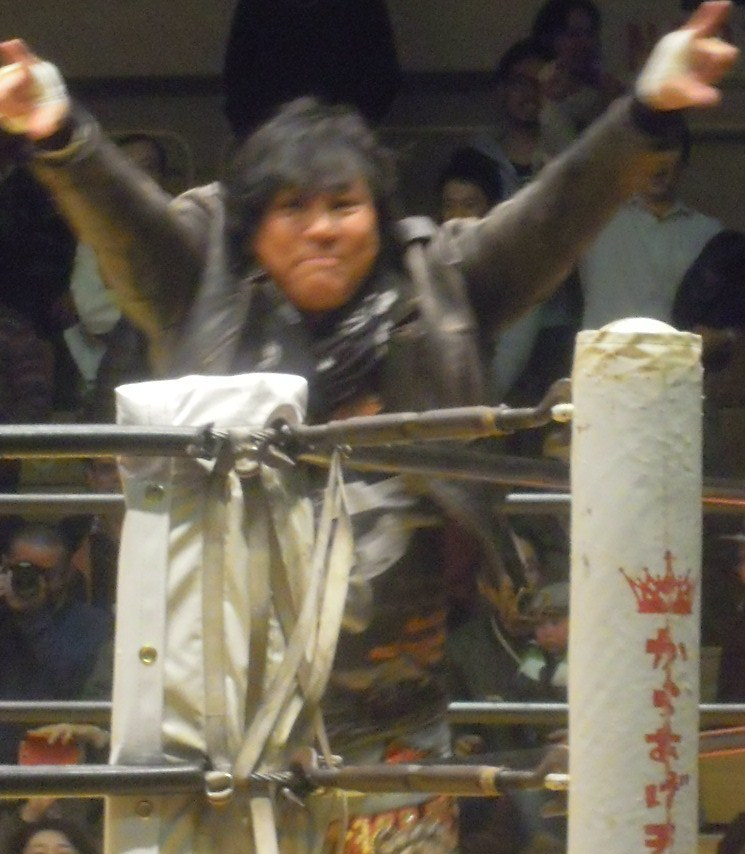
Atsushi Onita headlined the event against longtime rival Masashi Aoyagi.

At the 5th Anniversary Show, Genichiro Tenryu defeated Atsushi Onita in a match which stipulated that if Onita would lose then he would be forced to retire from wrestling. However, after the match, Onita revealed that the retirement stipulation would be for the next year's Anniversary Show and began a retirement tour that would take place throughout the year. Onita's former rival Masashi Aoyagi returned to FMW in the summer of 1994 and attacked Onita, leading to the two rivals facing each other for the first time in five years after having exchanged wins with each other in FMW's first two shows Grudge in Nagoya and Grudge in Tokyo in 1989. The two rivals first squared off in the WAR 6-Man Tag Team Tournament at WAR 2nd Anniversary Show, where Onita, Genichiro Tenryu and Crusher Bam Bam Bigelow defeated the team of Aoyagi, Kendo Nagasaki and Arashi in the semi-final round. Onita's match with Aoyagi at Summer Spectacular would be a no ropes electrified explosive barbed wire barricade double hell match. On August 22, the two rivals competed against each other for the last time before Summer Spectacular as the team of Onita and Mitsuhiro Matsunaga defeated the team of Aoyagi and Mr. Pogo in a street fight.

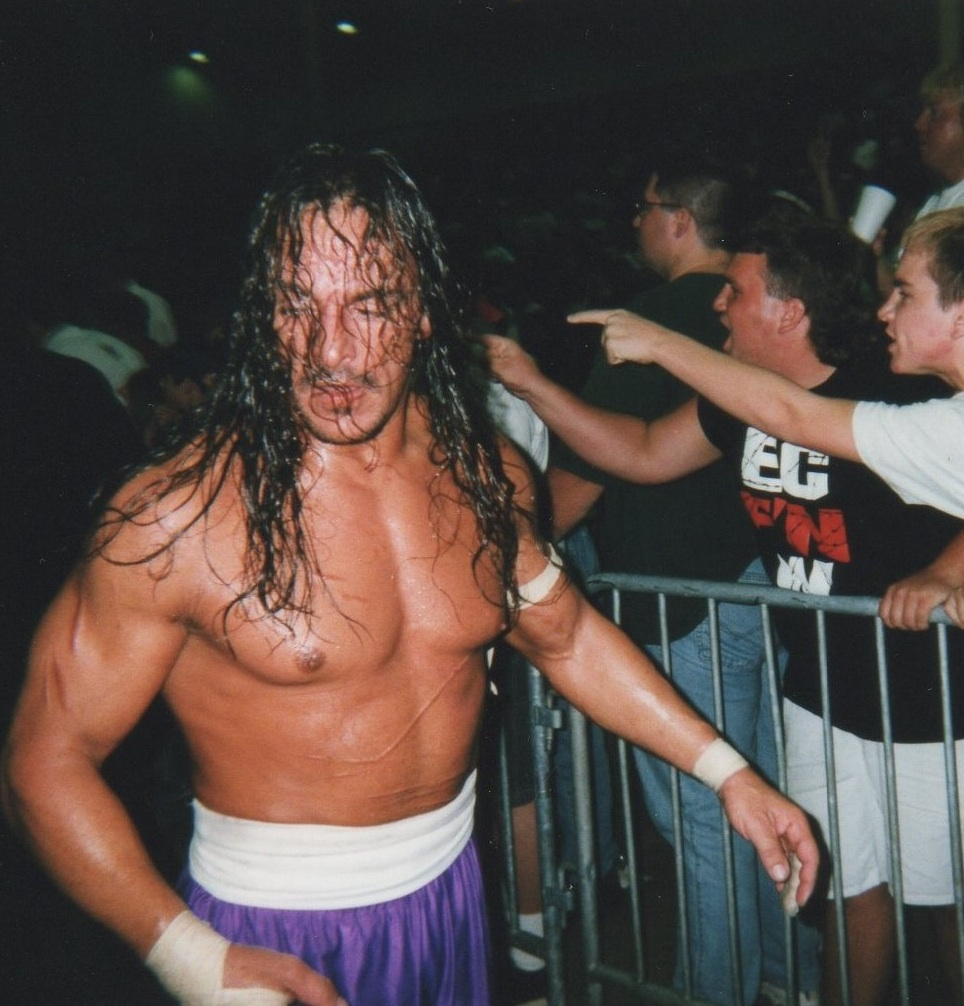
Sabu was the first opponent of Hayabusa in FMW.

Mitsuhiro Matsunaga unsuccessfully challenged Atsushi Onita for the FMW Brass Knuckles Heavyweight Championship at Year End Spectacular and after the loss, he joined Onita in his feud with Mr. Pogo and his entourage. Pogo defeated Onita for the title on January 6 and also won the FMW Brass Knuckles Tag Team Championship with Hisakatsu Oya on April 21. At 5th Anniversary Show, Matsunaga and Tarzan Goto unsuccessfully challenged Pogo and Oya for the tag team titles. Pogo and Matsunaga continued to feud with each other to renew their W*ING rivalry, leading to a match between the two at Summer Spectacular. On July 31, Onita and Matsunaga defeated Pogo and Oya in a no ropes barbed wire double hell deathmatch to win the Brass Knuckles Tag Team Championship.

Eiji Ezaki debuted in FMW in 1991 and Atsushi Onita realized potential in the rookie to become a big star in FMW and sent him on a learning excursion to Mexico in 1993. Ezaki developed a masked character for his excursion called Hayabusa. He made his first appearance in Japan as Hayabusa in the 1994 Super J-Cup against Jushin Liger in a highly acclaimed match. A match was made between Hayabusa and Sabu at Summer Spectacular to test how the character worked in FMW and if it clicked with the fans, marking Ezaki's first match as Hayabusa in FMW.

At 5th Anniversary Show, Team Canada members Ricky Fuji, Big Titan and The Gladiator took on Fuyuki-Gun from WAR in an interpromotional match. During the match, a miscommunication took place between Titan and Gladiator which led to both men shoving each other. Fuji tried to separate them but Gladiator won the match and then walked out on Team Canada, effectively ending the team. As a result, Titan and Gladiator began feuding with each other. Gladiator formed a team with Goro Tsurumi, Hideki Hosaka and Hisakatsu Oya. Titan and Fuji defeated Gladiator and Tsurumi on July 23. Titan and Gladiator had their first singles match against each other on July 31, which Gladiator won, setting up a rematch between the two at Summer Spectacular.

== Event ==
=== Preliminary matches ===
Katsutoshi Niiyama, Koji Nakagawa and Tetsuhiro Kuroda defeated Battle Ranger Z, Masato Tanaka and Gosaku Goshogawara in the opening match after Nakagawa performed a diving shoulder block to Tanaka.

The team of Miwa Sato, Megumi Kudo and Nurse Nakamura took on Mad Dog Military's Crusher Maedomari, Shark Tsuchiya and Tsuppari Mack in a Texas Deathmatch. Near the end of the match, Mack threw Kudo in the guardrail far from the ring, allowing Mad Dog Military to gain advantage as Tsuchiya performed a Tsuchi Bomb on Nakamura to get the win.

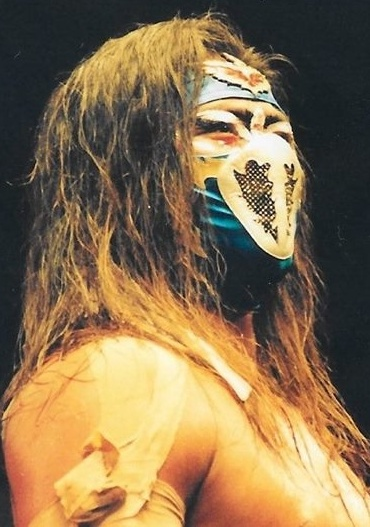
Eiji Ezaki made his first appearance as "Hayabusa" in FMW by defeating Sabu at the event.

Ricky Fuji performed a dragon suplex on Mach Hayato to get the victory.

The team of Dr. Luther and Dr. Hannibal defeated The Great Sasuke and Damien after Luther performed a diving leg drop to Damien.

Sambo Asako took on Mr. Gannosuke in a match, where Gannosuke picked up a major victory with a German suplex.

Combat Toyoda defended her FMW Independent and WWA World Women's Championship against Yukie Nabeno. Nabeno performed a Moonsault to win the title.

Eiji Ezaki made his first appearance in FMW as Hayabusa against Sabu. Sabu's back was injured when he placed Hayabusa on a table and attempted to drive him through the table with a 450° splash but Hayabusa moved out of the way. Hayabusa took advantage and performed a shooting star press to win the match. Both men shook hands with each other after the match.

Big Titan took on his former tag team partner The Gladiator. Gladiator performed an Awesome Bomb on Titan to win the match.

Mitsuhiro Matsunaga competed against Mr. Pogo in a Street Fight Deathmatch. After a back and forth match, Pogo hit Matsunaga with a flaming barbed wire baseball bat to win the match.

Tarzan Goto defeated Hisakatsu Oya with a guillotine chair shot.

=== Main event match ===
Atsushi Onita competed against his longtime rival Masashi Aoyagi in a no ropes electrified explosive barbed wire barricade double hell match. Aoyagi punished Onita with his stiff kicks and tossed him into the exploding double hell barbedwire. Despite sustaining the damage, Onita managed to make a comeback and performed two Thunder Fire Powerbombs and Aoyagi was knocked out, with Onita getting the victory.

== Aftermath ==
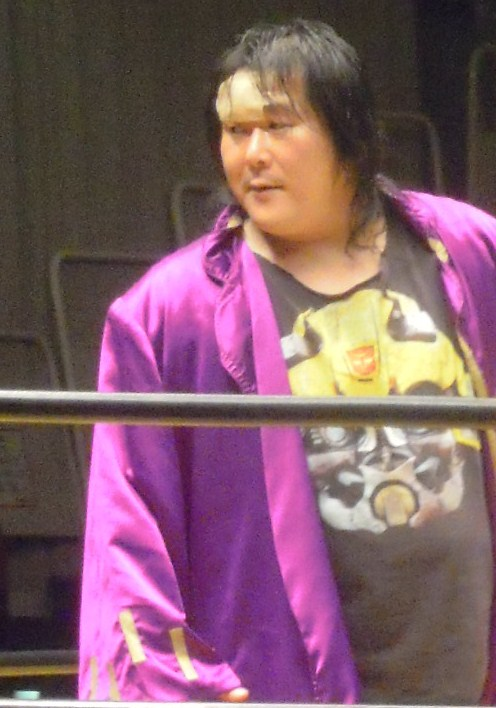
Yukihiro Kanemura's FMW debut shortly after the event would lead to the formation of W*ING Alliance.

Atsushi Onita was badly injured in his match with Masashi Aoyagi and required 111 switches in his body and got 1,032 stitches in his overall body. On September 7, Onita defeated Mr. Pogo in a no ropes exploding barbed wire double hell deathmatch to win the FMW Brass Knuckles Heavyweight Championship. After the match, former W*ING wrestler Yukihiro Kanemura debuted in FMW and attacked Onita. Kanemura quickly joined Pogo and Mitsuhiro Matsunaga to form W*ING Alliance. Matsunaga was initially reluctant but Onita accused him of being allied with W*ING and an angered Matsunaga left FMW team, forcing Onita and Matsunaga to vacate the FMW Brass Knuckles Tag Team Championship. A rivalry began between Onita and W*ING, which would ultimately culminate at Kawasaki Legend: Fall Spectacular on September 28, 1997, with Onita defeating W*ING Kanemura in a match, forcing W*ING to disband.

Hayabusa returned to Mexico after Summer Spectacular and finally made his full-time return to FMW at 6th Anniversary Show as Atsushi Onita's opponent in his retirement match. Onita defeated Hayabusa to retain the Brass Knuckles Heavyweight Championship and then immediately vacated the title to retire and pursue an acting career and Hayabusa succeeded Onita as the promotion's ace for the rest of FMW's existence.

Big Titan and The Gladiator continued their feud after Summer Spectacular, as Titan finally got a win over Gladiator in another rematch on September 7. Gladiator would join Mr. Pogo's W*ING Alliance and defeated Titan on December 9 to end the feud as Titan left FMW after the match.

After winning the Independent Women's Championship, Yukie Nabeno continued to feud with Mad Dog Military alongside Megumi Kudo. On September 7, the team of Combat Toyoda, Shark Tsuchiya and Crusher Maedomari took on Nabeno, Kudo and Miwa Sato in a match in which Tsuchiya stole the win from Toyoda, which brought Toyoda and Tsuchiya to blows and both women brawled with each other and Toyoda broke away from Mad Dog Military, turning face and siding with FMW to feud with Mad Dog Military. On December 9, the Mad Dog Military team of Shark Tsuchiya, Crusher Maedomari and Tsuppari Mack defeated Combat Toyoda, Megumi Kudo and Yukie Nabeno when Nabeno suffered a severe injury, which forced her to vacate her titles in a press conference on December 12. Nabeno would return to FMW in late 1995 but the severity of her injury forced her to retire on August 1, 1996.

== Results ==
No.	Results	Stipulations	Times
1	Katsutoshi Niiyama, Koji Nakagawa and Tetsuhiro Kuroda defeated Battle Ranger Z, Masato Tanaka and Gosaku Goshogawara	Six-man tag team match	10:27
2	Mad Dog Military (Crusher Maedomari, Shark Tsuchiya and Tsuppari Mack) defeated Miwa Sato, Megumi Kudo and Nurse Nakamura	Texas Deathmatch	17:13
3	Ricky Fuji defeated Mach Hayato	Singles match	11:01
4	Dr. Luther and Dr. Hannibal defeated The Great Sasuke and Damien	Tag team match	15:48
5	Mr. Gannosuke defeated Sambo Asako	Singles match	9:03
6	Yukie Nabeno defeated Combat Toyoda (c)	Singles match for the FMW Independent and WWA World Women's Championship	10:32
7	Hayabusa defeated Sabu	Singles match	14:15
8	The Gladiator defeated Big Titan	Singles match	10:20
9	Mr. Pogo defeated Mitsuhiro Matsunaga	Street Fight Deathmatch	12:15
10	Tarzan Goto defeated Hisakatsu Oya	Singles match	25:04
11	Atsushi Onita defeated Masashi Aoyagi via knockout	No Ropes Electrified Explosive Barbed Wire Barricade Double Hell match	17:07
(c) / – the champion(s) heading into the match
