= FMW 1st Anniversary Show =

1990 professional wrestling event

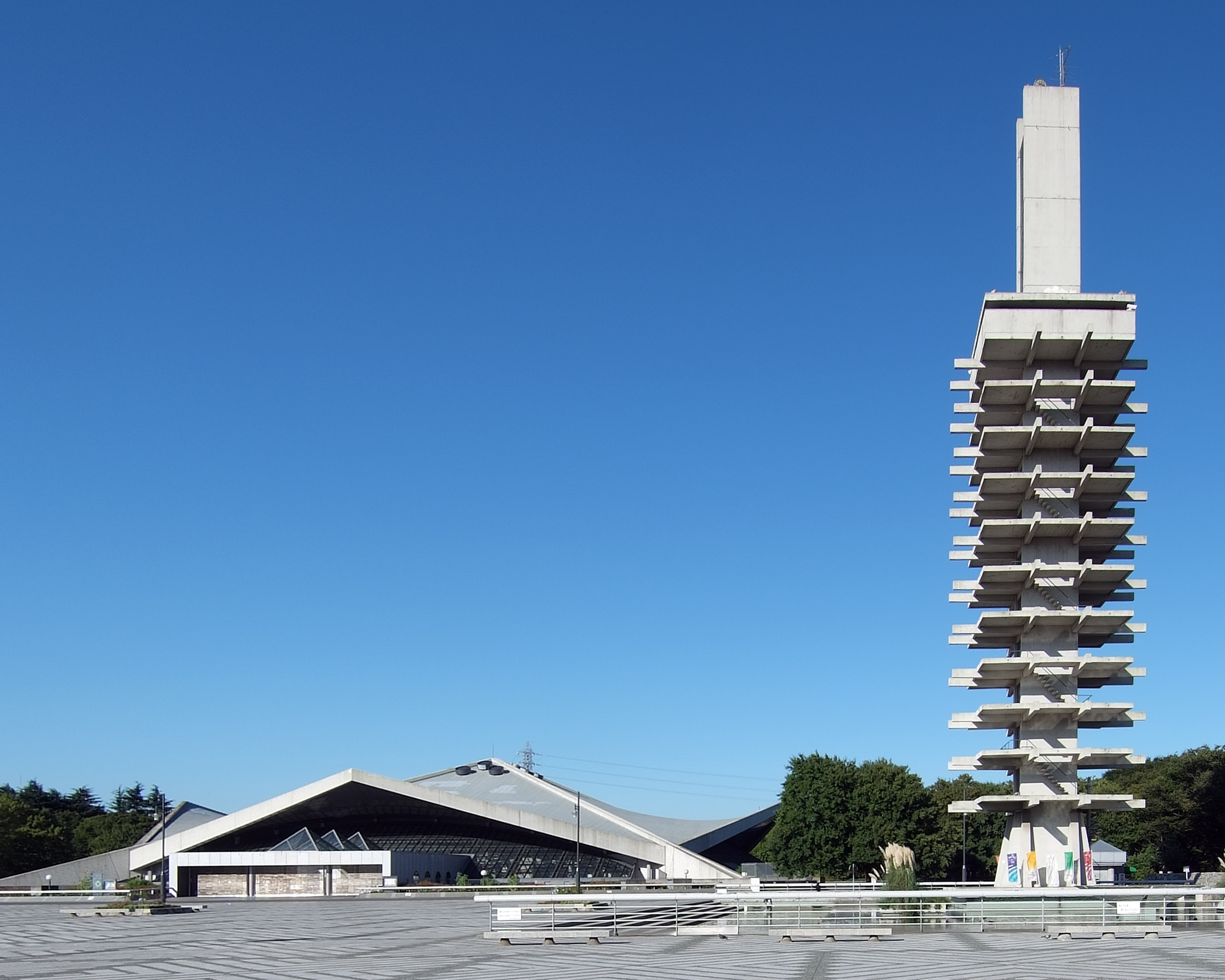
- Promotion: Frontier Martial-Arts Wrestling
- Date: November 5, 1990
- City: Tokyo, Japan
- Venue: Komazawa Gymnasium
- Attendance: 7,352

Event chronology
← Previous; Summer Spectacular in Shiodome	Next → FMW 2nd Anniversary Show: Fall Spectacular

FMW Anniversary Show chronology
← Previous; First	Next → 2nd Anniversary

FMW 1st Anniversary Show was the first professional wrestling supercard produced by the Japanese professional wrestling promotion Frontier Martial-Arts Wrestling (FMW). The event took place on November 5, 1990 at the Komazawa Gymnasium in Tokyo, Japan and was held to celebrate the first anniversary of FMW, which was founded on July 28, 1989. This was the first edition of the Anniversary Show, FMW's biggest event of the year.

The main event was a Texas Deathmatch between the company's promoter and owner Atsushi Onita and Mr. Pogo for Onita's WWA Brass Knuckles Heavyweight Championship. Onita won the match to retain the title.

== Background ==
=== Production ===
FMW owner Atsushi Onita originally planned to hold the company's 1st Anniversary Show on October 19, 1990 at the Sumo Hall in Tokyo, Japan but the plans were shelved after the arena management did not allow FMW to hold their show at the venue due to their intense brutal and barbaric deathmatches and due to the brutality of a storyline, which Onita had worked with World Wrestling Council (WWC) in Puerto Rico to bring WWC wrestlers to compete at the event. In the storyline, he was brutally attacked by Invader I, Víctor Quiñones, Mr. Pogo and El Gran Mendoza and a Japanese photographer took pics of his stitches. Onita and FMW received criticism and backlash from the Japanese audiences for working the storyline with Invader I (José González), who had murdered Bruiser Brody in reality, forcing FMW to withdraw the event from Sumo Hall and postpone it for November 5 and changed the venue to Komazawa Gymnasium.

=== Storylines ===
The main rivalry heading into the event was between Atsushi Onita and Mr. Pogo for the WWA Brass Knuckles Heavyweight Championship. Onita won the title on January 17, 1990 by defeating Beast the Barbarian. He had formed a unique partnership with Tarzan Goto, which would break up after Goto introduced Pogo to FMW during his match against Ricky Fuji on June 2. Onita was angered at it and Goto became a villain and a new arch rival to Onita and Pogo also became a rival to Onita. Onita defeated Goto in their first singles encounter, an empty arena match on June 24. Fuji joined Goto and Pogo to become Onita's rival but Goto switched back to join Onita after Onita defeated Goto in a No Ropes Exploding Barbed Wire Deathmatch to retain his title at Summer Spectacular. On August 20, Onita and Sambo Asako defeated Pogo and Fuji in a Street Fight after Onita scored the pinfall over Fuji. The following day, Fuji became Onita's partner in a match against Pogo and Gran Mendoza, thus quietly separating himself from Pogo to become Onita's ally. This transition made Pogo, the new top villain and the biggest arch rival to Onita. On August 25, Onita met Pogo in their first singles encounter in a street fight, which Onita won and set the stage for their match at the 1st Anniversary Show.

Jimmy Backlund won the AWA World Light Heavyweight Championship in 1988 and began defending it at FMW events after the promotion came into existence. On April 1, Backlund lost the title to Lee Gak-soo at Texas Street Fight but the title was vacated after Gak-soo apparently left FMW in September. Later that month, a tournament was conducted for the vacant title on September 25, in which Katsuji Ueda defeated Backlund in the tournament final to win the title, thus setting the stage for a title match between Ueda and Backlund at the 1st Anniversary Show.

Megumi Kudo, Noriyo Toyoda and Reuben Amada were trainees of the 1986 badge of All Japan Women's Pro-Wrestling and worked for the promotion for a few while before leaving it in 1988. The three were brought into FMW by Atsushi Onita in 1990 as they debuted in FMW on March 8, 1990 as a villainous team called The Outbreakers. They attacked Miwa Sato and Yuki Morimatsu before their match and Kudo and Toyoda delivered a spike piledriver to Sato to make an impact. They declared war on FMW's women's division and continued their impact until Kudo began showing signs of a transition as a fan favorite on May 19 after not joining Amada and Toyoda in cutting Sato's hair after Kudo and Amada had defeated Sato and Morimatsu in a hair vs. hair match. This created dissension within Outbreakers. On July 16, Kudo and Toyoda lost a match to Sato and Morimatsu and Kudo once again refused to join Amada and Toyoda in double-teaming Sato and Morimatsu, which led to Toyoda and Amada attacking Kudo and kicking her out of Outbreakers to complete her face turn. Kudo became their rival and faced Toyoda in a losing effort at Summer Spectacular in Shiodome. On August 25, Kudo and Sato defeated Amada and Toyoda in a street fight. Amada defeated Kudo in singles competition on September 25 due to Kudo injuring her knee, thus setting up a rematch between Kudo and Amada at 1st Anniversary Show.

== Event ==
=== Preliminary matches ===
The first match of the event was a tag team match in which Miwa Sato and Yuki Morimatsu defeated Eriko Tsuchiya and Yoshika Maedomari when Sato performed a Powerbomb on Tsuchiya. In the next tag team match, The Shooter and Billy Mack defeated Akihito Ichihara and Ricky Fuji when Mack delivered a Powerslam to Fuji. Ultraman and Lee Gak Soo defeated Kim Hyun Han and Yukihide Ueno after Ultraman made Ueno submit to an Ultra Clutch.

Combat Toyoda took on Beastie the Road Warrior to determine the inaugural WWA World Women's Champion. Toyoda performed a Thunder Fire Powerbomb to become the champion. Katsuji Ueda defended the AWA World Light Heavyweight Championship against Jimmy Backlund in a different style fight. Backlund made Ueda submit to a Scorpion Death Hold in the fifth round to win the title.

Megumi Kudo ended her rivalry with Reuben Amada by defeating her via knockout. Grigory Verichev defeated Sambo Asako in a different style fight in the first round with a triangle choke. Tarzan Goto defeated Soul King in a different style match by knocking him out in the second round with a belly to back inverted mat slam.

=== Main event match ===
Atsushi Onita defended the WWA Brass Knuckles Heavyweight Championship against Mr. Pogo in a Texas Deathmatch. Both wrestlers bled in the match by performing headbutts to one another. Onita delivered a Facebuster to Pogo and Pogo refused to answer the referee's ten count. As a result, Onita retained the title.

== Reception ==
The 1st Anniversary Show was considered to be FMW's most successful event at the time drawing a crowd of 7,352, which was considered to be the biggest crowd for a Japanese independent promotion. The success and popularity of FMW skyrocketed following the event.

== Aftermath ==
Atsushi Onita continued his feud with Mr. Pogo as the two clashed in the first-ever Exploding Double Hell Deathmatch on May 6, 1991, which Onita won. Later that month, FMW's co-founders Kazuyoshi Osako and Mickey Ibaragi left the company and formed their own hardcore wrestling promotion W*ING as they were unable to cope with Onita's ego. They hired Pogo and Víctor Quiñones with a promise of better salaries than FMW and Pogo was promised to be the top guy of the company and Quiñones was hired as the head booker of the organization because everyone was jealous of Onita being benefited from FMW's success. Pogo's departure led FMW to replace Pogo with Tarzan Goto as the company's lead villain and he renewed his rivalry with Onita, which culminated in a No Rope Exploding Barbed Wire Steel Cage Deathmatch at the 2nd Anniversary Show on September 23, 1991.

Following the success of 1st Anniversary Show, FMW capitalized on the emerging women's division as they held their first women's only show on December 22. At the show, Reuben Amada retired after losing to her teammate Combat Toyoda. This broke up The Outbreakers team and Toyoda formed a new stable Combat Army with Eriko Tsuchiya and Yoshika Maedomari. Megumi Kudo began to emerge as a rising star in the women's division and ultimately became the top female wrestler of the company.

== Results ==
No.	Results	Stipulations	Times
1	Miwa Sato and Yuki Morimatsu defeated Eriko Tsuchiya and Yoshika Maedomari	Tag team match	10:34
2	The Shooter and Billy Mack defeated Akihito Ichihara and Ricky Fuji	Tag team match	06:29
3	Ultraman and Lee Gak Soo defeated Kim Hyun Han and Yukihide Ueno	Tag team match	12:24
4	Combat Toyoda defeated Beastie the Road Warrior	Singles match for the inaugural WWA World Women's Championship	10:20
5	Jimmy Backlund defeated Katsuji Ueda (c) in Round 5	Different Style Fight for the AWA World Light Heavyweight Championship	12:36
6	Megumi Kudo defeated Reuben Amada	Singles match	11:58
7	Grigory Verichev defeated Sambo Asako	Different Style Fight	05:15
8	Tarzan Goto defeated Soul King via knockout	Different Style Fight	02:12
9	Atsushi Onita (c) defeated Mr. Pogo via knockout	Texas Deathmatch for the WWA Brass Knuckles Heavyweight Championship	11:08
(c) / – the champion(s) heading into the match

== See also ==
- 1990 in professional wrestling
- List of FMW supercards and pay-per-view events
