= Year End Spectacular (1993) =

- Promotion: Frontier Martial-Arts Wrestling
- Date: December 8, 1993
- City: Tokyo, Japan
- Venue: Tokyo International Trade Harumi Dome
- Attendance: 12,552

Event chronology
← Previous; Summer Spectacular	Next → FMW/MPW

Year End Spectacular chronology
← Previous; First	Next → 1995

Year End Spectacular (1993) was a major professional wrestling event produced by Frontier Martial-Arts Wrestling (FMW). The event took place on December 8, 1993 at the Tokyo International Trade Harumi Dome in Tokyo, Japan. This was the first Year End Spectacular event and would set the stage for future major events in FMW to close the month of December.

In the main event, FMW's ace Atsushi Onita defended the FMW Brass Knuckles Heavyweight Championship against W*ING's ace Mitsuhiro Matsunaga in the first-ever encounter between the Japanese deathmatch wrestling icons for the first time ever. Onita defeated Matsunaga in a no ropes exploding barbed wire deathmatch to retain the title. In another important match on the card, Mr. Pogo defeated Tarzan Goto.

== Background ==
A rivalry had taken place between FMW and W*ING when W*ING was established in 1991. W*ING's dominance ended when former W*ING wrestlers Mr. Pogo, Hideki Hosaka and Mitsuhiro Matsunaga joined FMW during the summer of 1993. They became Atsushi Onita's main rivals. At Summer Spectacular, Onita defeated Pogo to become the first-ever FMW Brass Knuckles Heavyweight Champion. Matsunaga had been W*ING's ace in 1992 and he challenged Onita to a title match for the first time ever between FMW's ace and W*ING's ace at Year End Spectacular, which Onita accepted. The match was originally scheduled to be a glass cage deathmatch in which cage would be made out of glass containing explosives and once a wrestler was thrown into the cage, the explosives would blow. The idea was rejected because it was considered unsafe for the wrestlers and fans at ringside.

== Event ==
=== Preliminary matches ===
In the opening match, the FMW team of Keiko Iwami, Nurse Nakamura, Miwa Sato and Yukie Nabeno defeated Ladies Legend Pro-Wrestling's (LLPW) team of Michiko Omukai, Michiko Nagashima, Carol Midori and Otaku Hozumi when Sato applied a Scorpion Death Hold on Omukai.

The team of Tetsuhiro Kuroda and Little Frankie defeated Strong Machine Chin and Tomezo Tsunokake when Kuroda applied a single-legged Boston crab on Chin.

Katsutoshi Niiyama, Mr. Gannosuke, Koji Nakagawa and Masato Tanaka took on Dark Ranger, Maseru Toi, Hisakatsu Oya and Hideki Hosaka in a tag team match. Niiyama performed a reverse side slam on Ranger to win the match.

Tsuppari Mack took on LLPW's Yasha Kurenai, who won by performing a crooked arm lariat.

A junior heavyweight match took place in which the team of Battle Ranger Z, SATO and Taka Michinoku took on Michinoku Pro Wrestling's (MPW) Super Delfin, Jinsei Shinzaki and Gran Naniwa. Ranger performed a top-rope frankensteiner on Naniwa to get the win.

The Mad Dog Military members Shark Tsuchiya and Crusher Maedomari took on All Japan Women's Pro-Wrestling (AJW)'s Aja Kong and Kyoko Inoue. Kong performed a backdrop suplex on Tsuchiya to get the win for AJW. In the next match, Mad Dog Military's Combat Toyoda took on AJW's Bull Nakano. Nakano performed a diving guillotine leg drop to hand FMW, their second consecutive defeat against AJW.

The Great Sasuke made his first defense of the FMW Independent World Junior Heavyweight Championship against Damien. Sasuke performed a Moonsault to retain the title.

Team Canada's Dr. Luther and Dr. Hannibal took on The Sheik and his nephew Sabu. Luther performed Sabu's Facecrusher to win the match.

Megumi Kudo defeated AJW's Takako Inoue with a top-rope frankensteiner to get the only win for FMW over AJW at the event.

The first major match of the event took place as FMW's Sambo Asako, Katsuji Ueda and Grigory Verichev took on Team Canada's Big Titan, The Gladiator and Ricky Fuji. Titan pinned Asako to win the match.

Mr. Pogo and Tarzan Goto competed in a match, during which Hisakatsu Oya blew a fireball on Goto, allowing Pogo to win the match.

=== Main event match ===
Atsushi Onita defended the FMW Brass Knuckles Heavyweight Championship against Mitsuhiro Matsunaga in the first-ever no ropes exploding barbed wire deathmatch. Onita performed a Thunder Fire Powerbomb to retain the title.

== Reception ==
Even though Year End Spectacular managed to draw a crowd of 12,552, the event itself and the Onita/Matsunaga main event was considered a disappointment.

== Aftermath ==
After their match at Year End Spectacular, Atsushi Onita and Mitsuhiro Matsunaga formed an alliance to feud with Mr. Pogo and his entourage. On January 6, 1994, Pogo defeated Onita to win the FMW Brass Knuckles Heavyweight Championship. Pogo and his sidekick Hisakatsu Oya won the FMW Brass Knuckles Tag Team Championship on April 21 and successfully defended the title against rivals Tarzan Goto and Matsunaga at 5th Anniversary Show. Onita and Matsunaga defeated Pogo and Oya to win the tag team championship on July 31. Pogo and Matsunaga's feud concluded at Summer Spectacular, where Pogo defeated Matsunaga in a non-title street fight deathmatch.

The old retired WWA World Martial Arts Tag Team Championship was re-installed as the FMW Brass Knuckles Tag Team Championship after Year End Spectacular and a round robin tournament took place for the vacant title, won by Team Canada's Big Titan and The Gladiator on January 18. They lost the title on April 21 and tension began growing within the group due to their recent losses. At the 5th Anniversary Show, Team Canada took on WAR's Fuyuki-Gun in a match and Titan and Gladiator had a miscommunication with each other. Team Canada won the match but Gladiator walked on Team Canada after the match to end the group.

== Results ==
No.	Results	Stipulations	Times
1	Keiko Iwami, Nurse Nakamura, Miwa Sato and Yukie Nabeno defeated Michiko Omukai, Michiko Nagashima, Carol Midori and Otaku Hozumi	Eight-woman tag team match	9:57
2	Tetsuhiro Kuroda and Little Frankie defeated Strong Machine Chin and Tomezo Tsunokake	Tag team match	8:19
3	Katsutoshi Niiyama, Mr. Gannosuke, Koji Nakagawa and Masato Tanaka defeated Dark Ranger, Maseru Toi, Hisakatsu Oya and Hideki Hosaka	Eight-man tag team match	10:01
4	Yasha Kurenai defeated Tsuppari Mack	Singles match	13:08
5	Battle Ranger Z, SATO and Taka Michinoku defeated Super Delfin, Jinsei Shinzaki and Gran Naniwa	Six-man tag team match	16:25
6	Aja Kong and Kyoko Inoue defeated Shark Tsuchiya and Crusher Maedomari	Tag team match	6:02
7	Bull Nakano defeated Combat Toyoda	Singles match	6:19
8	The Great Sasuke (c) defeated Damien	Singles match for the FMW Independent World Junior Heavyweight Championship	11:55
9	Dr. Luther and Dr. Hannibal defeated The Sheik and Sabu	Tag team match	6:03
10	Megumi Kudo defeated Takako Inoue	Singles match	6:19
11	Big Titan, The Gladiator and Ricky Fuji defeated Sambo Asako, Katsuji Ueda and Grigory Verichev	Street Fight	8:12
12	Mr. Pogo defeated Tarzan Goto	Singles match	13:01
13	Atsushi Onita (c) defeated Mitsuhiro Matsunaga	No Ropes Exploding Barbed Wire Deathmatch for the FMW Brass Knuckles Heavyweight Championship	17:32
(c) / – the champion(s) heading into the match
