= FMW 3rd Anniversary Show =

1992 professional wrestling event in Yokohama, Japan

FMW 3rd Anniversary Show: Fall Spectacular (1992)
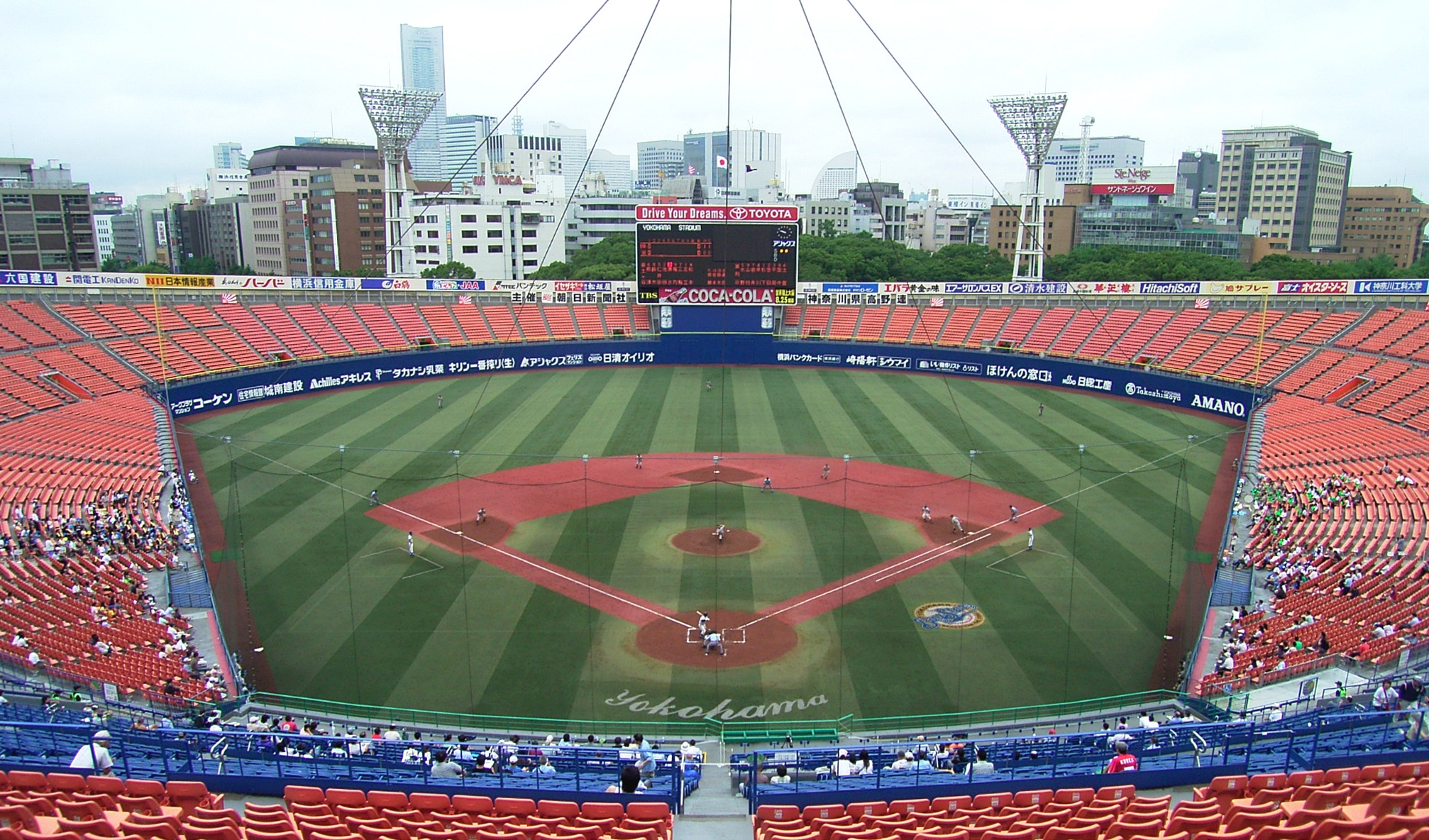
- Promotion: Frontier Martial-Arts Wrestling
- Date: September 19, 1992
- City: Yokohama, Japan
- Venue: Yokohama Stadium
- Attendance: 30,000

Event chronology
← Previous; FMW/WWA in Los Angeles	Next → FMW 4th Anniversary Show: Origin

FMW Anniversary Show chronology
← Previous; 2nd Anniversary	Next → 4th Anniversary

Fall Spectacular chronology
← Previous; 2nd Anniversary Show: Fall Spectacular	Next → Kawasaki Legend: Fall Spectacular

FMW 3rd Anniversary Show: Fall Spectacular (1992) was a professional wrestling event produced by Frontier Martial-Arts Wrestling (FMW). The event took place on September 19, 1992 at the Yokohama Arena in Yokohama, Japan. This was the third edition of the company's flagship event Anniversary Show, commemorating the third anniversary of the company.

In the main event, Tiger Jeet Singh defended the WWA World Martial Arts Heavyweight Championship against Atsushi Onita in a no rope explosion barbed wire deathmatch. Onita pinned Singh to win the title. The event also featured the first-ever interpromotional match of joshi wrestlers in Japan pitting FMW's Megumi Kudo and Combat Toyoda against AJW's Bull Nakano and Akira Hokuto in a losing effort.

== Background ==
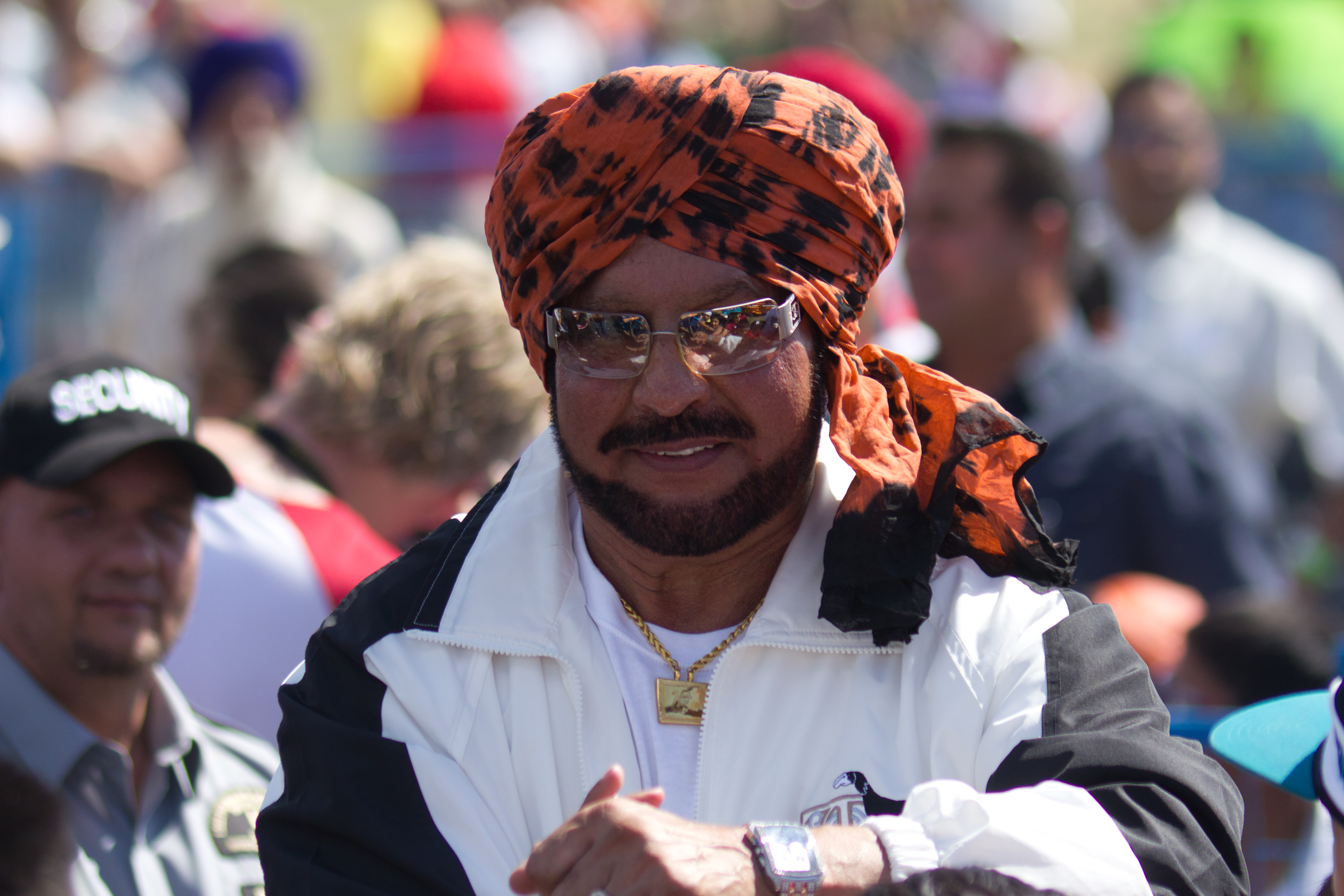
Tiger Jeet Singh defended the WWA World Martial Arts Heavyweight Championship against Atsushi Onita at the event.

Tiger Jeet Singh made his FMW debut on June 25, 1992 by attacking Atsushi Onita with his sword and made him bleed before Onita's scheduled title defense of the WWA World Martial Arts Heavyweight Championship against The Sheik in a no ropes barbed wire steel cage deathmatch. The injury allowed Sheik to win the title and Sheik rewarded the title to Singh for his assistance. Onita challenged Singh to a match to gain his revenge and Singh accepted it under his own rules, the first jungle deathmatch in FMW, which took place at the Ganryū-jima island on June 30, which Singh won. This would lead to a title match between Onita and Singh at the 3rd Anniversary Show.

Megumi Kudo and Combat Toyoda had been feuding with each other for the past year until their rivalry ended when Toyoda's Combat Army teammates Eriko Tsuchiya and Yoshika Maedomari turned on Toyoda after Combat Army defeated Kudo, Miwa Sato and Yukie Nabeno on July 19. On July 30, Kudo teamed with Tsuchiya and Maedomari to take on Toyoda, Sato and Nabeno in a match, which they won but Tsuchiya and Maedomari turned on Kudo after the match by attacking her until Toyoda made the save. On August 10, Toyoda defeated Tsuchiya and then Maedomari defeated Kudo later in the night with the help of Tsuchiya and then they double teamed her until Toyoda once again made the save for Kudo and turned into a fan favorite. Kudo and Toyoda formed a tag team to defeat Maedomari and Tsuchiya on August 11. On September 1, Kudo successfully defended her WWA World Women's Championship against Toyoda. After the match, they challenged Bull Nakano and Akira Hokuto of All Japan Women's Pro-Wrestling to an interpromotional match at the 3rd Anniversary Show to prove that they were the best set of women wrestlers.

== Event ==
=== Preliminary matches ===
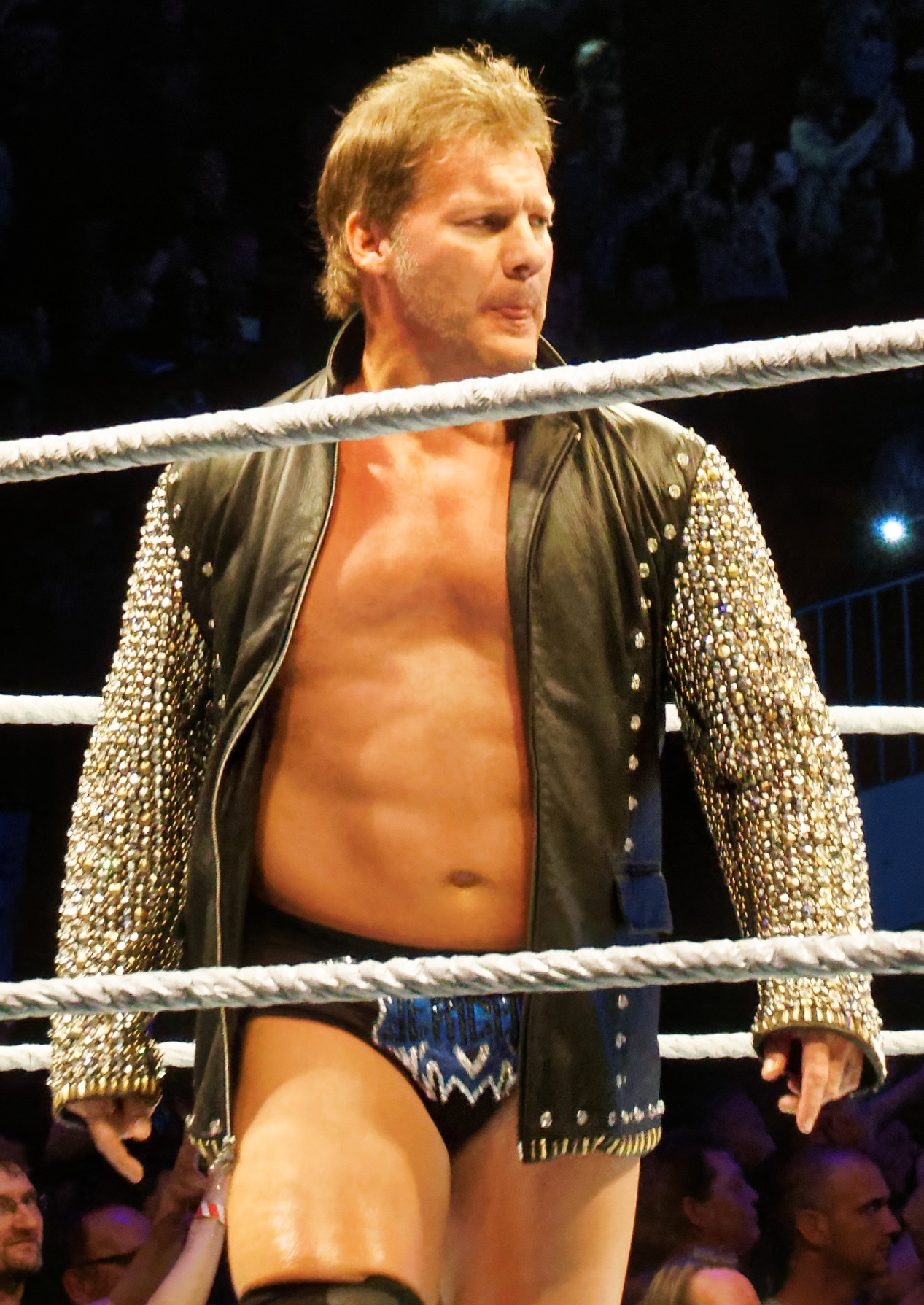
Chris Jericho competed in the opening match of the 3rd Anniversary Show.

Chris Jericho and Kevin Faule defeated FMW's young rising preliminary wrestlers Eiji Ezaki and Koji Nakagawa in the opening match when Jericho pinned Ezaki after Jericho and Faule performed a double dropkick on Ezaki.

Eriko Tsuchiya, Miwa Sato and Kumiko Matsuda defeated Rie Nakamura, Naoko Kumazawa and Yumiko Komatsuzaki in a six-woman tag team match when Tsuchiya pinned Kumazawa following a Tsuchi Bomb.

Sabu defeated Shoji Nakamaki in a quick match with a Moonsault in Nakamaki's retirement match, followed by a tag team match in which The Alligators took on Amigo Ultra and Ultramancito. Ultra applied a surfboard on Alligator Man #1 to get the victory. Loc Matrere followed with a win over Katsuji Ueda in a different style fight with a right low kick.

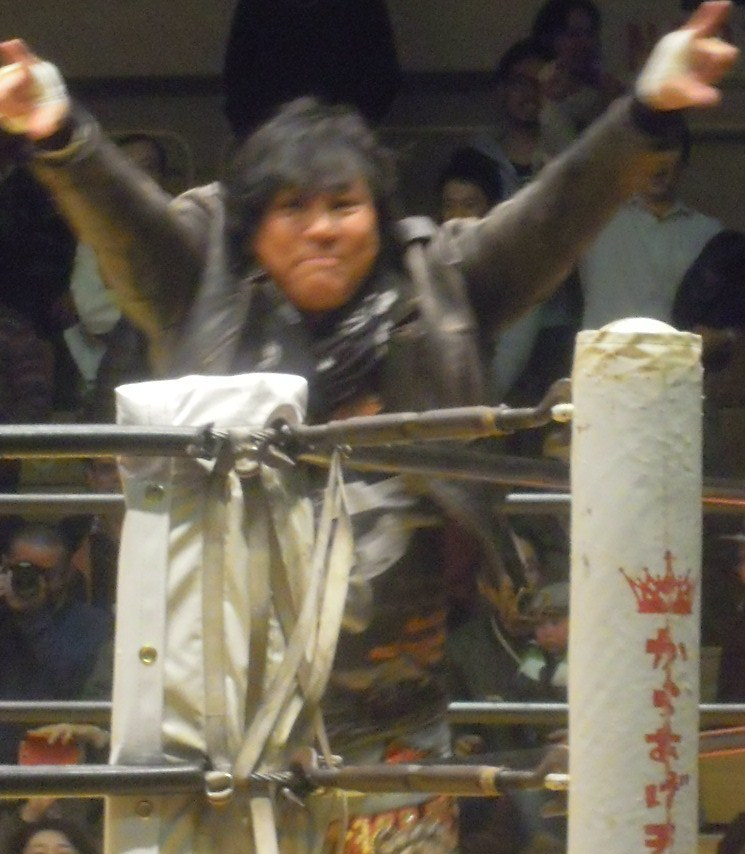
Atsushi Onita defeated Tiger Jeet Singh in the main event to win his fourth WWA World Martial Arts Heavyweight Championship.

Big Titan, The Gladiator and Horace Boulder took on Sambo Asako, Great Punk and Ricky Fuji in a street fight stretcher match. Titan knocked out Fuji with a Powerbomb to win the match. John Tolos and Killer Kowalski fought to a ten-minute time-limit draw.

Combat Toyoda and Megumi Kudo represented FMW against All Japan Women's Pro-Wrestling's Bull Nakano and Akira Hokuto in an interpromotional match. Nakano performed a diving guillotine leg drop on Kudo to win the match.

Tarzan Goto and Grigory Verichev successfully defended the WWA World Martial Arts Tag Team Championship against Leon Spinks and Brian Sayodill when Goto made Sayodill submit to an Argentine backbreaker rack.

=== Main event match ===
Tiger Jeet Singh defended the WWA World Martial Arts Heavyweight Championship against Atsushi Onita in a no rope explosion barbed wire deathmatch in the main event of the show. Onita performed a Thunder Fire Powerbomb on Singh for the win.

== Aftermath ==
The WWA World Martial Arts Tag Team Championship was retired after 3rd Anniversary Show and Grigory Verichev reunited with former tag team partner Atsushi Onita to participate in the Street Fight Tag Team Tournament in the fall of the year, which they won by defeating Big Titan and Verichev's former tag team partner Tarzan Goto.

Sabu and The Sheik continued their alliance with Tiger Jeet Singh after 3rd Anniversary Show and became Atsushi Onita's rivals. He successfully defended the WWA World Martial Arts Heavyweight Championship against Sabu in a no ropes barbed wire deathmatch on January 12, 1993. On the same event, Ricky Fuji turned on FMW during an elimination tag team match and formed Team Canada with Big Titan, The Gladiator, Dr. Luther and Dr. Hannibal, which became the top villainous group of FMW. On January 18, Onita defeated Sheik to win Sheik's United States Championship and then returned the title to Sheik which caused Sheik and Sabu to turn into fan favorites and formed an alliance with Onita.

Megumi Kudo and Combat Toyoda's interpromotional match paved the way for many interpromotional matches between female wrestlers of FMW and AJW. Kudo and Toyoda rebounded with their loss at the 3rd Anniversary Show by defeating AJW's Manami Toyota and Toshiyo Yamada at the 4th Anniversary Show.

== Results ==
No.	Results	Stipulations	Times
1	Chris Jericho and Kevin Faule defeated Eiji Ezaki and Koji Nakagawa	Tag team match	10:12
2	Eriko Tsuchiya, Miwa Sato and Kumiko Matsuda defeated Rie Nakamura, Naoko Kumazawa and Yumiko Komatsuzaki	Six-woman tag team match	19:00
3	Sabu defeated Shoji Nakamaki	Singles match	2:37
4	Amigo Ultra and Ultramancito defeated The Alligators (Alligator Man #1 and Alligator Man #2)	Tag team match	10:32
5	Loc Matrere defeated Katsuji Ueda	Different Style Fight	17:32
6	Big Titan, The Gladiator and Horace Boulder defeated Sambo Asako, Great Punk and Ricky Fuji by knockout	Street Fight Stretcher match	11:49
7	John Tolos vs. Killer Kowalski ended in a time limit draw	Singles match	10:00
8	Bull Nakano and Akira Hokuto defeated Combat Toyoda and Megumi Kudo	Interpromotional women's tag team match	13:54
9	Tarzan Goto and Grigory Verichev (c) defeated Leon Spinks and Brian Sayodill	Tag team match for the WWA World Martial Arts Tag Team Championship	10:39
10	Atsushi Onita defeated Tiger Jeet Singh (c)	No Rope Explosion Barbed Wire Deathmatch for the WWA World Martial Arts Heavyweight Championship	13:54
(c) / – the champion(s) heading into the match
