= FMW 8th Anniversary Show =

8th anniversary wrestling show

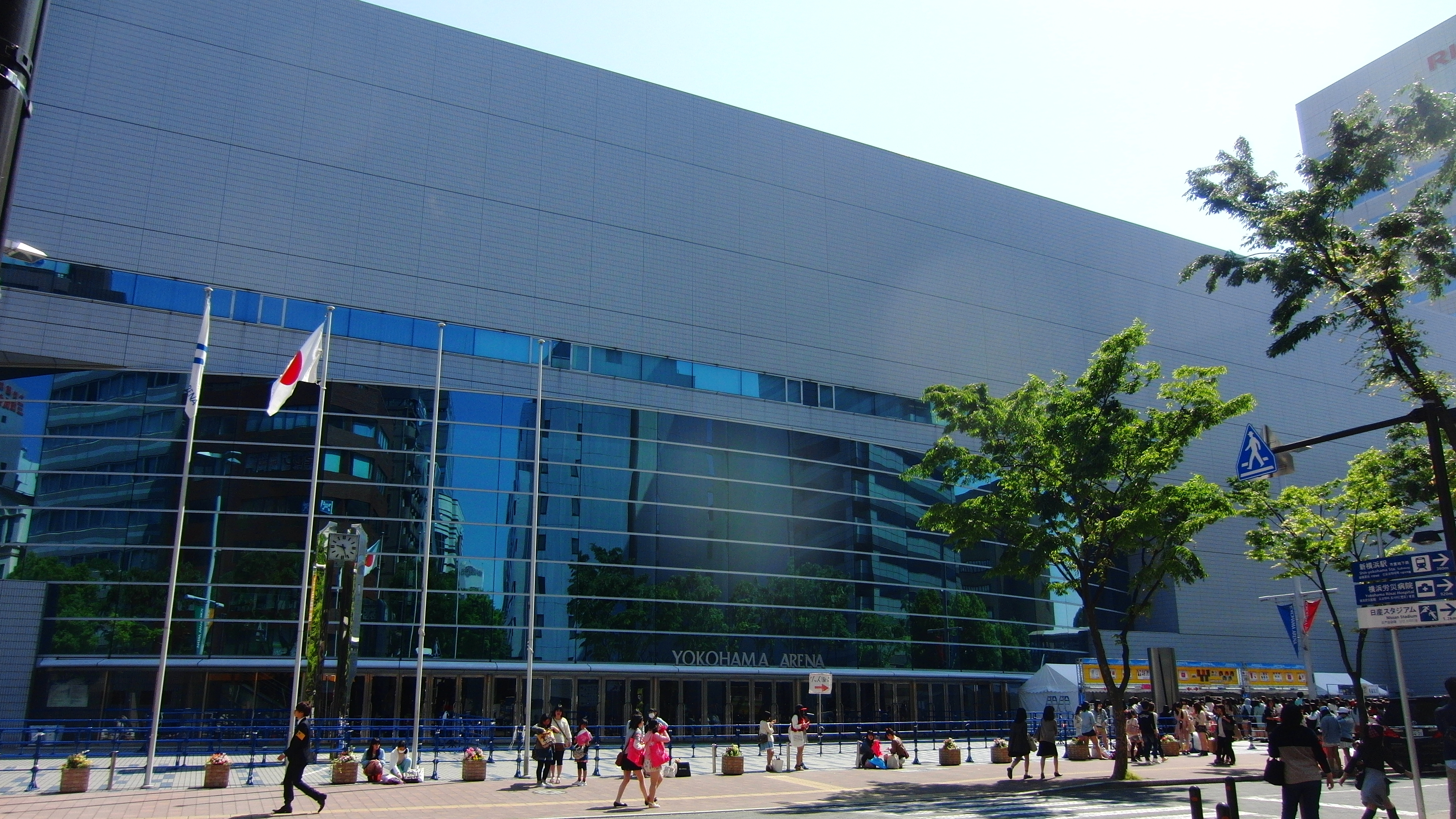
- Promotion: Frontier Martial-Arts Wrestling
- Date: April 29, 1997
- City: Yokohama, Japan
- Venue: Yokohama Arena
- Attendance: 16,000

Event chronology
← Previous; Year End Spectacular	Next → Japanese Survival

FMW Anniversary Show chronology
← Previous; 7th Anniversary	Next → 9th Anniversary

FMW 8th Anniversary Show was a professional wrestling event produced by Frontier Martial-Arts Wrestling (FMW). The event took place on April 29, 1997 at the Yokohama Arena in Yokohama, Japan. This was the eighth edition of the company's flagship event Anniversary Show, commemorating the seventh anniversary of the company. It was the second edition of the event at the Yokohama Arena after 3rd Anniversary Show in 1992 and the first time in four years that the event was not held at Kawasaki Stadium.

The main event was a no rope 200 volt double hell double barbed wire barricade double landmine crushed glass electrical barbed wire deathmatch between Shark Tsuchiya and Megumi Kudo for Tsuchiya's FMW Independent and WWA World Women's Championship. Kudo defeated Tsuchiya to win the title. The match was billed as Kudo's farewell match as she retired from wrestling after the event. In other major matches on the card, FMW's Atsushi Onita and Masato Tanaka and W*ING Alliance's W*ING Kanemura defeated Funk Masters of Wrestling's Terry Funk, Cactus Jack and The Gladiator in a Texas Tornado Street Fight Deathmatch and Hayabusa defeated Mr. Gannosuke in a highly acclaimed mask vs. hair match, the first of the historic matches of their epic rivalry.

== Event ==
=== Preliminary matches ===
The opening match of the event was a tag team match, in which Ricky Fuji teamed with Ricky Morton to take on Hido and Dragon Winger. Fuji executed a jumping DDT and a brainbuster to Winger for the win.

Next, the team of Tetsuhiro Kuroda and Hayato Nanjyo took on Flying Kid Ichihara and Crypt Keeper. Keeper delivered a double underhook powerbomb to Hayato, allowing Ichihara to execute a moonsault to Ichihara for the win.

Next, Koji Nakagawa competed against Funk Masters of Wrestling member Katsutoshi Niiyama. After a back and forth match, Nakagawa delivered an exploder suplex to Niiyama for the win. After the match, Niiyama turned into a fan favorite by shaking hands with Nakagawa as it was Niiyama's last match in FMW.

Next, the team of Kaori Nakayama, Michiko Omukai, Chikako Shiratori, Mizuki Endo and Yoko Ikeda competed against Lioness Asuka, Eagle Sawai, Crusher Maedomari, Michiko Nagashima and Miss Mongol in a ten-woman tag team match. Nakayama delivered a frankensteiner to Mongol for the win.

Later, Jinsei Shinzaki competed against Super Leather. After a back and forth action, Shinzaki applied a Gokuraku-Gatame on Leather to make him submit.

Next, Hisakatsu Oya and The Headhunters competed against Fuyuki-Gun (Kodo Fuyuki, Jado and Gedo) in a Street Fight. A Headhunter delivered a double underhook powerbomb and a moonsault to Gedo for the win.

Next, Hayabusa took on Mr. Gannosuke in a Mask vs. Hair match. Near the end of the match, Gannosuke delivered a Northern Lights suplex to Hayabusa but got a near-fall and then Hayabusa delivered a Falcon Arrow to Gannosuke for the win. After the match, Hayabusa offered to forgive Gannosuke and not to cut his hair if Gannosuke left Funk Masters of Wrestling and joined FMW. Gannosuke then shook hands with Hayabusa but turned on him by attacking him and ripping off his mask and then attempted to blow fire on him until Jinsei Shinzaki made the save.

The penultimate match was a Texas Tornado Street Fight Deathmatch, pitting the team of Atsushi Onita, Masato Tanaka and W*ING Kanemura against Funk Masters of Wrestling members Terry Funk, Cactus Jack and The Gladiator. Kanemura dived from the top rope and hit Gladiator with a chair for the win.

=== Main event match ===
In the main event, Shark Tsuchiya defended the FMW Women's Championship against Megumi Kudo in a No Rope 200 Volt Double Hell Double Barbed Wire Barricade Double Landmine Crushed Glass Electrical Barbed Wire Deathmatch. This was Kudo's retirement match. Near the end of the match, Kudo blocked a lariat by Tsuchiya, but both fell into the barbed wire. Tsuchiya managed to escape but Kudo was trapped and the barbed wire exploded with Kudo within it. She then fell on Tsuchiya and Tsuchiya got pinned, resulting in Kudo winning the title.

== Reception ==
Stuart of Puroresu Central gave negative reviews to the event, calling it "a very disappointing major show", with "there were no good matches (a couple of those clipped matches looked promising, but were cut to shreds)." He panned the deathmatch between FMW and Funk Masters of Wrestling, considering it "the biggest letdown of the show and wasn't as good as people hoped it would be." He praised Kudo's performance stating that she "had an epic performance and took uncanny punishment. The post-match stuff was also very effective, a vintage FMW moment with raw emotion, not just a storyline. She went out with the belts, but it would have been nice if she retired having a match worthy of her talent, against someone like Aja Kong or Lioness Asuka." He praised the Hayabusa/Gannoske hair vs. hair match, suggesting it to be a "real good match" He praised Hayabusa's performance by stating that he "really stepped up to carry Gannosuke to more than just a spot-to-spot match", with Gannosuke "wasn't that great here, after wallowing as Tarzan Goto's underling for so long. He always showed potential, but never really had the chance to build on it until arriving in FMW". He stated that the "match was close and the finish was quick and somewhat sudden", with "telling the tale of how evenly matched they were" and opined that the match was a "good start to their excellent feud". He also praised Nakagawa/Niiyama match, with "the action was solid and the sequences quite smooth".

== Results ==
No.	Results	Stipulations	Times
1	Ricky Fuji and Ricky Morton defeated Hido and Dragon Winger	Tag team match	8:20
2	Flying Kid Ichihara and Crypt Keeper defeated Tetsuhiro Kuroda and Hayato Nanjyo	Tag team match	11:11
3	Koji Nakagawa defeated Katsutoshi Niiyama	Singles match	14:39
4	Kaori Nakayama, Michiko Omukai, Chikako Shiratori, Mizuki Endo and Yoko Ikeda defeated Lioness Asuka, Eagle Sawai, Crusher Maedomari, Michiko Nagashima and Miss Mongol	Ten-woman tag team match	13:03
5	Jinsei Shinzaki defeated Super Leather via submission	Singles match	10:29
6	Hisakatsu Oya and The Headhunters defeated Fuyuki-Gun (Kodo Fuyuki, Jado and Gedo)	Street Fight	12:30
7	Hayabusa defeated Mr. Gannosuke	Mask vs. Hair match	13:22
8	Atsushi Onita, Masato Tanaka and W*ING Kanemura defeated Terry Funk, Cactus Jack and The Gladiator	Texas Tornado Street Fight Deathmatch	20:20
9	Megumi Kudo defeated Shark Tsuchiya (c)	No Rope 200 Volt Double Hell Double Barbed Wire Barricade Double Landmine Crushed Glass Electrical Barbed Wire Deathmatch for the FMW Independent and WWA World Women's Championship	21:46
(c) / – the champion(s) heading into the match
