= FMW Anniversary Show =

- Promotions: Frontier Martial-Arts Wrestling
- Other names: Fall Spectacular (1991–1992); Judgment Day / Entertainment Wrestling Special Live (1999)
- First event: FMW 1st Anniversary Show
- Last event: FMW 12th Anniversary Show
- Event gimmick: The anniversary celebration of FMW and flagship event of the company

The FMW Anniversary Show was the biggest annual professional wrestling supercard promoted by the Japanese hardcore wrestling promotion Frontier Martial-Arts Wrestling (FMW) between 1990 and 2001 to celebrate the anniversary of the company. The ninth edition of the event was the first to be broadcast on pay-per-view.

== Dates and venues ==
Event	Date	City	Venue	Attendance	Main event	Ref
1st Anniversary Show	November 5, 1990	Tokyo, Japan	Komazawa Gymnasium	7,352	Atsushi Onita (c) vs. Mr. Pogo in a Death match for the WWA Brass Knuckles Heavyweight Championship	
2nd Anniversary Show: Fall Spectacular (1991)	September 23, 1991	Kawasaki, Kanagawa	Kawasaki Stadium	33,000	Atsushi Onita vs. Tarzan Goto in a No Rope Explosive Barbed Wire Deathmatch	
3rd Anniversary Show: Fall Spectacular (1992)	September 19, 1992	Yokohama, Japan	Yokohama Stadium	30,000	Tiger Jeet Singh (c) vs. Atsushi Onita in a No Rope Explosive Barbed Wire Deathmatch for the WWA World Martial Arts Heavyweight Championship	
4th Anniversary Show	May 5, 1993	Kawasaki, Kanagawa	Kawasaki Stadium	41,000	Atsushi Onita vs. Terry Funk in an Exploding Ring Barbed Wire Landmine match	
5th Anniversary Show	May 5, 1994	Kawasaki, Kanagawa	Kawasaki Stadium	52,000	Atsushi Onita vs. Genichiro Tenryu in an Exploding Ring Barbed Wire Steel Cage match	
6th Anniversary Show	May 5, 1995	Kawasaki, Kanagawa	Kawasaki Stadium	58,250	Atsushi Onita (c) vs. Hayabusa in an Exploding Ring Barbed Wire Steel Cage match for the FMW Brass Knuckles Heavyweight Championship	
7th Anniversary Show	May 5, 1996	Kawasaki, Kanagawa	Kawasaki Stadium	33,231	Terry Funk and Mr. Pogo vs. Hayabusa and Masato Tanaka in a No Rope Explosive Barbed Wire Time Bomb Landmine Double Hell match	
8th Anniversary Show	April 29, 1997	Yokohama, Japan	Yokohama Arena	16,000	Shark Tsuchiya (c) vs. Megumi Kudo in a No Rope 200 Volt Double Hell Double Barbed Wire Barricade Double Landmine Crushed Glass Electrical Barbed Wire Deathmatch for the FMW Women's Championship	
9th Anniversary Show: Entertainment Wrestling Live	April 30, 1998	Yokohama, Japan	Yokohama Cultural Gymnasium	5,200	Mr. Gannosuke (c) vs. Hayabusa for the FMW Brass Knuckles Heavyweight Championship and the FMW Independent Heavyweight Championship	
10th Anniversary Show: Entertainment Wrestling Special Live	November 23, 1999	Yokohama, Japan	Yokohama Arena	11,000	H vs. "Hayabusa" with special guest referee Shawn Michaels	
11th Anniversary Show: Backdraft	May 5, 2000	Tokyo, Japan	Komazawa Gymnasium	4,200	Hayabusa vs. Masato Tanaka	
12th Anniversary Show: Kawasaki Legend 2001	May 5, 2001	Kawasaki, Japan	Kawasaki Stadium	10,500	Hayabusa and The Great Sasuke vs. Tetsuhiro Kuroda and Mr. Gannosuke in an Octagon Cage Electric Bomb Deathmatch	
(c) – refers to the champion(s) heading into the match
