= Summer Spectacular (1990) =

Professional wrestling event in Japan

Summer Spectacular in Shiodome
- Promotion: Frontier Martial-Arts Wrestling
- Date: August 4, 1990
- City: Tokyo, Japan
- Venue: Shiodome
- Attendance: 4,520

Event chronology
← Previous; Texas Street Fight	Next → FMW 1st Anniversary Show

Summer Spectacular chronology
← Previous; First	Next → 1993

Summer Spectacular in Shiodome was the first Summer Spectacular professional wrestling event produced by Frontier Martial-Arts Wrestling (FMW). The event took place on August 4, 1990, in the Shiodome in Tokyo, Japan. It was aired as a television special on Samurai! TV. The event was a counterpart to World Wrestling Federation's SummerSlam event in August.

Seven matches were contested at the event. In the main event, Atsushi Onita successfully defended the WWA World Brass Knuckles Heavyweight Championship against Tarzan Goto in the first-ever no ropes exploding barbed wire deathmatch. Other predominant matches on the card featured the team of Katsuji Ueda, Mr. Pogo and Ricky Fuji defeating Kim Hyun Han, Lee Gak Soo and Sambo Asako, and Noriyo Toyoda defeating her former Outbreakers partner Megumi Kudo in a street fight.

== Background ==
Atsushi Onita was the top star of FMW since the promotion came to existence in 1989 and Tarzan Goto was his right-hand man and frequent ally. Goto grew irate at Onita as he felt that Onita was toning down professional wrestling by teaming with karate fighter Lee Gak-soo against Sambo Asako and Mitsuteru Tokuda on June 2. Goto responded by bringing in Mr. Pogo to FMW on the same show during his match against Ricky Fuji, which angered Onita. Onita and Goto began feuding with each other, resulting in Goto turning heel, setting up a match between Onita and Goto for Onita's WWA World Brass Knuckles Heavyweight Championship at Summer Spectacular. Their first match against each other was an empty arena match, which took place on June 24, which Onita won. The popularity of street fights and barbed wire deathmatches led Onita to introduce a new speciality in his title match with Goto, which was adding explosives in the barbed wire, in which if a wrestler was sent into the wire then explosions would be set off to spark crowd interest.

Megumi Kudo, Noriyo Toyoda and Reuben Amada were trainees of the 1986 badge of All Japan Women's Pro-Wrestling and worked for the promotion for a few while before leaving it in 1988. The three were brought into FMW by Atsushi Onita in 1990 as they debuted in FMW on March 8, 1990, as a villainous team called The Outbreakers. They attacked Miwa Sato and Yuki Morimatsu before their match, and Kudo and Toyoda delivered a spike piledriver to Sato to make an impact. They declared war on FMW's women's division and continued their impact until Kudo began showing signs of a transition as a fan favorite on May 19 after not joining Amada and Toyoda in cutting Morimatsu's hair after Kudo and Amada had defeated Sato and Morimatsu in a hair vs. hair match. This created dissension within Outbreakers. On July 16, Kudo and Toyoda lost a match to Sato and Morimatsu and Kudo once again refused to join Amada and Toyoda in double-teaming Sato and Morimatsu, which led to Toyoda and Amada attacking Kudo and kicking her out of Outbreakers to complete her face turn.

== Event ==
=== Preliminary matches ===
Ryo Miyake defeated Akihito Ichihara in the first match.

Yuki Morimatsu defeated Kumiko Matsuda in the first joshi match of the event.

Mascarita Sagrada and Ultraman defeated Pirata Morgan and Yukihide Ueno when Ultraman performed a Frankensteiner on Morgan.

Magnificent Mimi defended her All Europe Women's Championship against Miwa Sato. Mimi performed a diving bodypress on Sato to retain the title.

The former Outbreakers teammates Megumi Kudo and Noriyo Toyoda competed against each other in a street fight. They brawled with each other at the ringside area and Kudo managed to make Toyoda bleed but Toyoda overpowered her opponent and performed a Thunder Fire Powerbomb on Kudo to win the match.

A six-man tag team match was next, in which the team of Kim Hyun Han, Lee Gak Soo and Sambo Asako took on Katsuji Ueda, Mr. Pogo and Ricky Fuji. Ueda performed a right punch to Han to knock him out for the win.

=== Main event match ===
Atsushi Onita defended his WWA World Brass Knuckles Heavyweight Championship against Tarzan Goto in the main event of Summer Spectacular, the first-ever no ropes exploding barbed wire deathmatch, in which electricity was put into the barbed wire and an explosion would be set off every time a wrestler would be sent into the barbed wire. After a back and forth match, Onita performed a Thunder Fire Powerbomb to knock out Goto and retain the title.

== Aftermath ==
Noriyo Toyoda received a major push after her street fight win over Megumi Kudo and Atsushi Onita repackaged her as "Combat Toyoda" due to her willingness to take pain in street fights. Toyoda was pushed as the company's top female and defeated Beastie the Road Warrior for the first WWA World Women's Championship at the 1st Anniversary Show. Megumi Kudo would move on to feud with the other Outbreakers member Reuben Amada, whom she defeated at the 1st Anniversary Show.

Atsushi Onita and Tarzan Goto made peace after Summer Spectacular and Goto turned face. Ricky Fuji followed suit, and they became united to feud with Mr. Pogo, who replaced Goto as the top villain. Onita defeated Pogo in a street fight on August 25, which was the first singles encounter between the duo. At 1st Anniversary Show, Onita defeated Pogo in a Texas Deathmatch to retain the WWA World Brass Knuckles Heavyweight Championship.

== Results ==
No.	Results	Stipulations	Times
1	Ryo Miyake defeated Akihito Ichihara	Singles match	4:10
2	Yuki Morimatsu defeated Kumiko Matsuda	Singles match	6:29
3	Mascarita Sagrada and Ultraman defeated Pirata Morgan and Yukihide Ueno	Tag team match	8:17
4	Magnificent Mimi (c) defeated Miwa Sato	Singles match for the All Europe Women's Championship	10:31
5	Noriyo Toyoda defeated Megumi Kudo	Street Fight	10:31
6	Katsuji Ueda, Mr. Pogo and Ricky Fuji defeated Kim Hyun Han, Lee Gak Soo and Sambo Asako via knockout	Six-man tag team match	8:34
7	Atsushi Onita (c) defeated Tarzan Goto via knockout	No Ropes Exploding Barbed Wire Deathmatch for the WWA World Brass Knuckles Heavyweight Championship	11:14
(c) / – the champion(s) heading into the match

== See also ==
- 1990 in professional wrestling
