= Katsuji Ueda =

Japanese kickboxer, martial artist and professional wrestler

Personal information
- Born: December 15, 1945 Japan
- Died: 20 April 2017 (aged 71) Japan

Professional wrestling career
- Ring name: Katsuji Ueda
- Billed height: 177 cm (5 ft 10 in)
- Billed weight: 96 kg (212 lb)
- Trained by: Atsushi Onita; FMW Dojo
- Debut: January 7, 1990
- Retired: 2016

Katsuji Ueda (上田 勝次, Ueda Katsuji; December 15, 1945–April 20, 2017) was a Japanese kickboxer, martial artist and professional wrestler, best known for his time with Frontier Martial-Arts Wrestling (FMW) between 1990 and 1995. He was usually utilized in martial arts fights during his FMW career and won the promotion's World Light Heavyweight Championship three times. He was also a bodyguard for Atsushi Onita.

== Professional wrestling career ==
=== Frontier Martial-Arts Wrestling ===
==== World Light Heavyweight Champion (1990–1992) ====
Trained and skilled in martial arts and kickboxing, Katsuji Ueda was brought into Frontier Martial-Arts Wrestling (FMW) by Atsushi Onita, who created the promotion to prove that professional wrestling was better than martial arts and held many fights between wrestlers and martial artists. Ueda's first professional wrestling match in FMW took place in the Battle Resistance Tournament on January 7, 1990, where he lost to Mitsuhiro Matsunaga in the opening round. Initially a villain, Ueda headlined the July 16 show against company's top star Atsushi Onita in a martial arts match, which FMW dubbed "different style fight". At Summer Spectacular in Shiodome, Ueda teamed with Mr. Pogo and Ricky Fuji to defeat the team of Kim Hyun Han, Lee Gak-soo and Sambo Asako. He scored a major victory over Tarzan Goto on August 25. On September 25, Ueda defeated The Shooter, Ricky Fuji and Jimmy Backlund to win a tournament for the vacant AWA World Light Heavyweight Championship. This began a feud with Backlund, which culminated in a mixed fight at the 1st Anniversary Show. Ueda turned fan favorite and joined forces with Atsushi Onita on the FMW team.

On August 31, 1991, Ueda knocked out Mark Starr to win his second FMW World Light Heavyweight Championship. The following month, Ueda lost a mixed style fight to former WWA World Martial Arts Heavyweight Champion Grigory Verichev via knockout at 2nd Anniversary Show. Ueda would then enter the World's Strongest Tag Team Tournament with Calypso Jim for the newly created WWA World Martial Arts Tag Team Championship, in which their team scored only three points. Ueda successfully defended his World Light Heavyweight Championship against The Shooter on February 8, 1992. On March 23, Ueda lost the title to Dr. Luther. Ueda regained the title by defeating Luther for his third WWA World Martial Arts Junior Heavyweight Championship on September 7. This would be the last match of the title as it would be retired in 1993. Ueda would lose a different style fight to Loc Matrere at 3rd Anniversary Show.

==== Different style fights (1993–1995) ====
Ueda became a major fixture on FMW's mid-card and he was usually utilized for different style fights against various professional wrestlers, kickboxers and martial artists but FMW began phasing away the martial arts style in 1993 and mainly focused on the deathmatch wrestling style and Ueda was restricted to mainly different style fights in the mid-card. At 4th Anniversary Show, Ueda teamed with Tarzan Goto and The Great Punk against Team Canada's Big Titan, Ricky Fuji and The Gladiator in a captain's fall losing captain leaves town no rope barbed wire tornado street fight deathmatch. At Summer Spectacular, Ueda got a knockout win over former boxing heavyweight champion and former WWA World Martial Arts Heavyweight Champion Leon Spinks in a different style fight. At Year End Spectacular, the kickboxer Ueda teamed with former judoka Grigory Verichev and former sambo fighter Sambo Asako against the team of Big Titan, Ricky Fuji and The Gladiator in a street fight.

Ueda continued to perform in the mid-card, usually getting wins over lower and lesser-known talent. He knocked out Katsutoshi Niiyama in a different style fight at 5th Anniversary Show on May 5, 1994. He continued to perform in FMW's mid-card for the next year. His last major different style fight took place at the 6th Anniversary Show on May 5, 1995, in which he knocked out Tetsuhiro Kuroda. His last match was a loss to Katsutoshi Niiyama on June 27.

=== Independent circuit (1998–2016) ===
Katsuji Ueda retired from active competition after quitting FMW and competed occasionally. He returned to wrestling after three years on January 18, 1998 by losing to George Takano for a Tokyo Pro Wrestling show. He would then work for Atsushi Onita's promoted shows between 1998 and 2002. On November 23, 2004, Ueda appeared for a Pro Wrestling Zero-One event, where he teamed with Koji Ishinnki to defeat Rikiya Fudo and Shinsuke Z Yamagasa in a tag team match. On March 14, 2016, Ueda defeated The Shooter in a mixed martial arts match at an Atsushi Onita–promoted show. He then competed in two matches for Cho Sento Puroresu FMW.

== Death ==
Ueda died from a heart attack on April 20, 2017. He was 71 years old.

== Championships and accomplishments ==
- Frontier Martial-Arts Wrestling
  - AWA World Light Heavyweight Championship / WWA World Martial Arts Junior Heavyweight Championship (3 times)
  - AWA World Light Heavyweight Championship Tournament (1990)
