= W*ING Alliance =

Stable
- Members: Yukihiro/W*ING Kanemura; Mitsuhiro Matsunaga; Mr. Pogo; Hideki Hosaka; Hisakatsu Oya; Goro Tsurumi; Hido/BADBOY Hido; Super Leather; The Gladiator; Jason the Terrible; Dragon Winger
- Name: W*ING Alliance
- Debut: September 25, 1994
- Disbanded: September 28, 1997

The W*ING Alliance was a Japanese professional wrestling group that existed in Frontier Martial-Arts Wrestling (FMW) between 1994 and 1997. The group consisted of wrestlers from the W*ING promotion, which ended in March 1994 due to FMW hiring the top tier talent of W*ING and the W*ING alumni wanted to avenge the demise of the company from FMW and the company's owner Atsushi Onita in storyline.

== Background ==
Kazuyoshi Osako and Kiyoshi Ibaragi were former FMW employees who formed their own hardcore wrestling promotion W*ING to compete with FMW but the company was unable to compete with FMW after the company's top fan favorite Mitsuhiro Matsunaga and top villain Mr. Pogo both defected to FMW in 1993. Another W*ING wrestler Hideki Hosaka defected to FMW as well and W*ING ultimately met its demise on March 21, 1994. The group consisted of former wrestlers from the W*ING promotion who joined FMW during 1993-1994 and held Atsushi Onita and FMW responsible for the company's end and their aim was to take over and end FMW.

== History ==
=== Formation ===
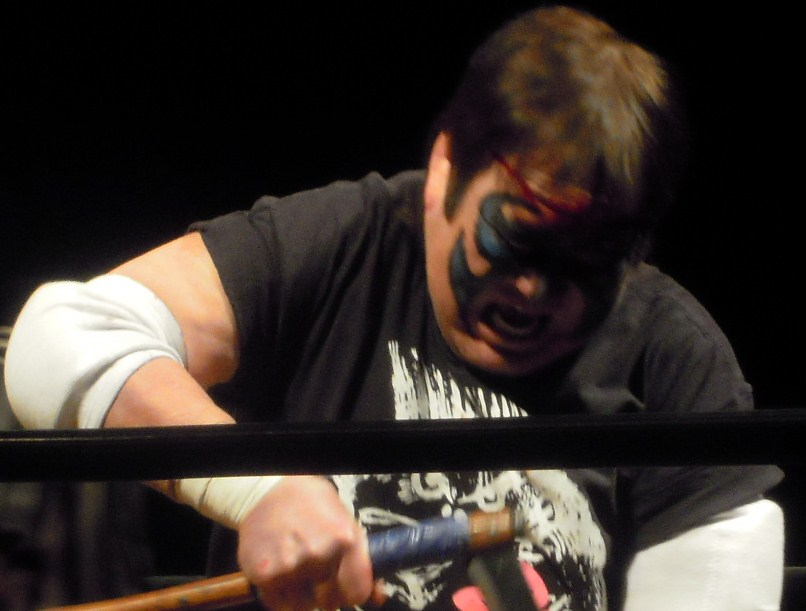
Mr. Pogo

Mr. Pogo and Mitsuhiro Matsunaga had been arch rivals in W*ING and they resumed their rivalry in FMW, which culminated in a street fight at Summer Spectacular on August 28, 1994, which Pogo won. Matsunaga was being groomed to succeed Atsushi Onita as the promotion's ace. On September 7, Onita defeated Pogo to win the Brass Knuckles Heavyweight Championship and Yukihiro Kanemura, a former W*ING wrestler made his FMW debut by attacking Onita after the match. Kanemura and Pogo, both former W*ING wrestlers formed an alliance and convinced Matsunaga to join them to form an alliance of W*ING alumni but Matsunaga did not make the decision. Matsunaga visited Kanemura at hospital after Kanemura was getting treated for suffering some burns during a match in W*ING and Onita misunderstood it and accused Matsunaga of betraying FMW. An enraged Matsunaga turned villain and joined Kanemura, Pogo and Hideki Hosaka to form the W*ING Alliance to avenge the demise of W*ING from Onita and FMW.

On September 25, Kanemura and Matsunaga took on Tarzan Goto and Hisakatsu Oya, which ended in a no contest after Oya turned on Goto and triple teamed him with Kanemura and Matsunaga to join W*ING Alliance. The next match was an exploding barbed wire dynamite pool elimination match in which Mr. Pogo and Hideki Hosaka teamed with The Gladiator against Onita, Mr. Gannosuke and Katsutoshi Niiyama. Pogo's team lost the match. The W*ING faction would strengthen with the addition of Gladiator, Goro Tsurumi and Hido.

=== Championship success ===
The Brass Knuckles Tag Team Championship had been vacated after Onita and Matsunaga split from each other due to Matsunaga joining W*ING. W*ING started gaining championship success after Mr. Pogo and The Gladiator defeated Onita and Mr. Gannosuke in a falls count anywhere match to win the vacant Brass Knuckles Tag Team Championship on October 28. W*ING would wrestle Onita and his FMW wrestlers in several matches throughout the fall of 1994. On January 21, 1995, Pogo competed under his alter ego Pogo Daiyo and defeated Onita to win the Brass Knuckles Heavyweight Championship to reach to the top of FMW's championship hierarchy. On February 6, Hideki Hosaka defeated Ricky Fuji to win the Independent World Junior Heavyweight Championship, resulting in W*ING holding all of FMW's men's titles. The no rope barbed wire deathmatches between FMW and W*ING continued to headline FMW events into earlier part of 1995 to build momentum into Onita's retirement match at 6th Anniversary Show. During this time, Hisakatsu Oya left W*ING to form Lethal Weapon with Tarzan Goto and Ricky Fuji, thus beginning a feud between W*ING and Lethal Weapon. The formation of this faction would slow down W*ING's momentum as Onita chose Goto to succeed him as the promotion's ace and Goto replaced Pogo's spot as the top villain. On February 24, W*ING members Yukihiro Kanemura, Mitsuhiro Matsunaga and Hideki Hosaka took on the new Lethal Weapon group in a losing effort. Later that night, Pogo and Gladiator lost their tag team titles to Onita and Mr. Gannosuke but Pogo regained it with Yukihiro Kanemura on March 7.

On March 15, Onita and Pogo competed in their alter egos "The Great Nita" and "Pogo Daiyo" respectively, with Nita coming out victorious. However, on March 30, Pogo Daiyo defeated Nita in a lumberjack match. Hideki Hosaka lost the Independent World Junior Heavyweight Championship to Koji Nakagawa on the same event. Horace Boulder was brought in as the newest member of W*ING in April. Tarzan Goto quit FMW in April due to refusing to job to Onita in Onita's retirement match at 6th Anniversary Show and Onita chose Pogo for the spot but Pogo refused it because he was not approached first. As a result, Pogo dropped the Brass Knuckles Heavyweight Championship to Onita on May 4, just one day shy of the 6th Anniversary Show, so Onita could defend the title against his new chosen successor Hayabusa in his retirement match. At 6th Anniversary Show, Horace Boulder and Gladiator lost to Katsutoshi Niiyama and Masato Tanaka in a tag team match and Mitsuhiro Matsunaga, Hideki Hosaka and Hido lost a six-man tag team match to Kishin Kawabata, Takashi Ishikawa and Apollo Sagawa. Pogo and Kanemura lost the Brass Knuckles Tag Team Championship to Lethal Weapon members Love Guns (Hisakatsu Oya and Ricky Fuji) after a miscommunication took place between Pogo and Kanemura. After the match, Pogo blew fire on Kanemura to quit W*ING and joined Lethal Weapon. Gladiator and Horace Boulder followed him to Lethal Weapon as well. This positioned Lethal Weapon as the top villainous group in FMW and W*ING began losing its significance.

=== Emergence of new factions ===
Following Pogo's departure, Kanemura began rising as the focal point of the W*ING group and he changed his ring name to W*ING Kanemura out of loyalty to the group during a match against Masato Tanaka on May 17. On May 28, Matsunaga and Kanemura defeated their former W*ING allies Pogo and Horace Boulder in a street fight. Kanemura and Matsunaga both lost to Pogo in a street fight and a barbed wire deathmatch respectively. On June 27, Super Leather debuted in FMW to replace the injured Kanemura as the newest member of W*ING by teaming with Hido and Mitsuhiro Matsunaga to defeat Horace Boulder, Mr. Pogo and The Gladiator in a street fight. Kanemura, Hideki Hosaka and Hido represented W*ING in the Young Lions Tournament, a round robin tournament consisting of newcomers of FMW, while Masato Tanaka, Koji Nakagawa and Tetsuhiro Kuroda being the other three participants. During the tournament, the W*ING members competed against each other as Hosaka defeated Kanemura on July 18 and Hido on July 19 and Kanemura defeated Hido on July 22. Kanemura reached the finals of the tournament against Tanaka on July 30, which he lost but both men qualified for the Grand Slam Tournament for the vacant Brass Knuckles Heavyweight Championship. Kanemura and Matsunaga were both entered into the Grand Slam Tournament and squared off against each other on August 31, where Matsunaga emerged victorious.

Matsunaga turned into a fan favorite after showing respect to his opponent Hayabusa by shaking hands with him after Hayabusa defeated Matsunaga in a Grand Slam tournament match on September 24. This led to FMW and W*ING forming a brief alliance as Matsunaga teamed with Hayabusa to take on his W*ING Alliance teammate W*ING Kanemura and FMW's Masato Tanaka in a tag team match on October 28, which Hayabusa and Matsunaga won. Super Leather and Hido questioned Kanemura and Matsunaga for turning on W*ING by siding with FMW. Hido joined Lethal Weapon but it was short lived as Matsunaga turned on Hayabusa during a tag team match against Mr. Pogo and Super Leather on November 20 while Hido and Leather turned on Lethal Weapon to reform W*ING and feud with FMW and Lethal Weapon. On January 10, 1996, Matsunaga, Kanemura and Hido defeated Hayabusa, Masato Tanaka and Koji Nakagawa in a barbed wire spider net deathmatch. Hayabusa was injured after the match and Tanaka teamed with Tetsuhiro Kuroda and Ricky Fuji of Lethal Weapon to defeat Matsunaga, Kanemura and Hido in the first WarGames match in FMW on February 23. The event also saw Super Leather win the Brass Knuckles Heavyweight Championship from Hisakatsu Oya, who substituted for the champion The Gladiator. After the WarGames match, Puerto Rican Army debuted in FMW and attacked FMW and W*ING and the two sides joined forces to battle the new group.

=== Alliance with FMW ===
In late 1995, Jason the Terrible joined W*ING Alliance and he formed a tag team with Super Leather called "The Faces of Dead" and they defeated Hisakatsu Oya and Horace Boulder to win the Brass Knuckles Tag Team Championship on January 5, 1996. Super Leather defeated Gladiator in a rematch to retain the Brass Knuckles Heavyweight Championship on March 15. W*ING began a slow turn as fan favorites by joining FMW against the new Puerto Rican Army. On March 30, Faces of Dead lost the Brass Knuckles Tag Team Championship to Puerto Rican Army members The Headhunters after Super Leather turned on Jason the Terrible and joined Puerto Rican Army. W*ING competed in three matches at 7th Anniversary Show as Jason the Terrible defeated Nanjyo Hayato and the team of Mitsuhiro Matsunaga, Hido and Hideki Hosaka defeated Puerto Rican Army members Toryu, Miguel Perez and Shoji Nakamaki. W*ING Kanemura challenged Cactus Jack in a high-profile Caribbean barbed wire barricade spider net broken glass death match for Jack's King of the Deathmatch title which he had won in IWA Japan. Jack retained his title.

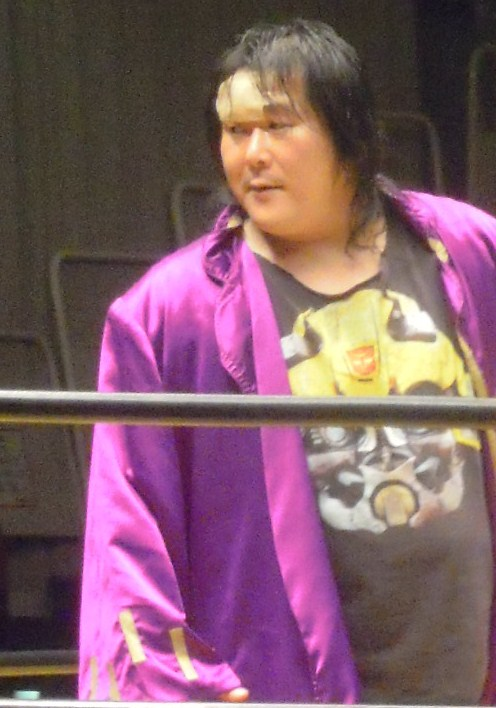
W*ING Kanemura

After the event, Mitsuhiro Matsunaga and Jason the Terrible left FMW as Matsunaga joined Big Japan Pro Wrestling, reducing W*ING to only three members W*ING Kanemura, Hideki Hosaka and Hido. On June 12, W*ING Alliance held their first event under the W*ING banner titled W*ING Take Off 2nd, which was headlined by a street fight between Hido, Hideki Hosaka and Kanemura against Masato Tanaka, Koji Nakagawa and Tetsuhiro Kuroda in a losing effort. However, the W*ING Alliance received a positive reaction from the audiences of the old W*ING promotion. W*ING Alliance held more shows under the W*ING banner for the next few months. Kanemura and Hido participated in an eight-man single elimination tournament was held for the new Independent Heavyweight Championship. Hido was eliminated after losing to Super Leather in the quarter-final while Kanemura defeated Koji Nakagawa, Super Leather and Masato Tanaka at Summer Spectacular to win the tournament and become the first Independent Heavyweight Champion. Hido also succeeded at the event by winning a battle royal. Kanemura's Independent Heavyweight Championship win established him as the frontman and leader of the W*ING Alliance.

Kanemura was injured in an exploding barbed wire double hell deathmatch between W*ING Alliance and the team of Masato Tanaka, Koji Nakagawa and Tetsuhiro Kuroda on September 1, which put him out of action. On September 12, W*ING promoted their second show under the W*ING banner, which was headlined by Hido against FMW's ace Hayabusa in a losing effort. Dragon Winger joined W*ING in October and Kanemura returned to the company as well. During this time, the Puerto Rican Army had become the Funk Masters of Wrestling and Kanemura faced Funk Masters of Wrestling member The Gladiator in a title unification match for Kanemura's Independent Heavyweight Championship and Gladiator's Brass Knuckles Heavyweight Championship to determine the unified Double Champion at Year End Spectacular. Kanemura lost the match.

=== Dissolution ===
In the fall of 1996, Atsushi Onita returned to FMW to fight Funk Masters of Wrestling and W*ING formed an alliance with FMW by siding with Onita. On April 25, 1997, Kanemura and Hido defeated The Headhunters to win the Brass Knuckles Tag Team Championship, ending Headhunters' year-long reign. At 8th Anniversary Show, Hido and Dragon Winger were defeated by Ricky Fuji and Ricky Morton in the opening match while Kanemura teamed with Atsushi Onita and Masato Tanaka to defeat Terry Funk, Cactus Jack and The Gladiator from Funk Masters of Wrestling. On May 25, Kanemura and Hido teamed with Onita to defeat Masato Tanaka, Koji Nakagawa and Tetsuhiro Kuroda in a barbed wire deathmatch after Kanemura pinned Tanaka and the match stipulated that the winning person would face Onita at Fall Spectacular which would take place on September 28 at the Kawasaki Stadium. This earned Kanemura, a match against Onita at the event. W*ING promoted its final show on July 13, which was headlined by a barbed wire double hell deathmatch between Kanemura, Hido and Hosaka and the team of Tanaka, Nakagawa and Kuroda, which the FMW team won.

Kanemura and Hido lost the Brass Knuckles Tag Team Championship to Funk Masters of Wrestling's Mr. Gannosuke and Hisakatsu Oya on August 21. Kanemura and Onita headlined the Fall Spectacular event on September 28 at the Kawasaki Stadium by competing in a no rope barbed wire electrified dynamite land mine time bomb death match, which stipulated that Onita would retire if he lost and W*ING Alliance would be forced to disband if Kanemura lost. Onita defeated Kanemura to end the rivalry between the two that had been stemming from 1994 and W*ING Alliance disbanded as a result.

== Championships and accomplishments ==
- FMW Brass Knuckles Heavyweight Championship (2 times) - Mr. Pogo (1), Super Leather (1)
- FMW Brass Knuckles Tag Team Championship (4 times) - Mr. Pogo and The Gladiator (1), Mr. Pogo and Yukihiro Kanemura (1), Super Leather and Jason the Terrible (1), W*ING Kanemura and Hido (1)
- FMW Independent Heavyweight Championship (1 time) - W*ING Kanemura (1, inaugural)
- FMW Independent World Junior Heavyweight Championship (1 time) - Hideki Hosaka
- FMW Independent Heavyweight Championship Tournament (1996)
