= FMW Women's Championship =

Professional wrestling women's championship

Details
- Promotion: Frontier Martial-Arts Wrestling
- Date established: November 5, 1990
- Date retired: September 28, 1997

Other name(s)
- WWA World Women's Championship; FMW Independent Women's Championship
Statistics
- First champion(s): Combat Toyoda
- Most reigns: Megumi Kudo (6 reigns)
- Longest reign: Megumi Kudo (426 days)
- Shortest reign: Shark Tsuchiya (<1 day)

The FMW Women's Championship consisted of two Japanese women's professional wrestling championships, the FMW Independent Women's Championship and the WWA World Women's Championship. The championships were contested in the promotion Frontier Martial-Arts Wrestling (FMW). During the heyday of FMW, the female wrestlers wrestled in the same types of bloody death matches as the FMW men, and were feared by other Japanese female wrestlers for their toughness and intensity.

== Title history ==
=== Names ===
Name	Years
WWA World Women's Championship	November 5, 1990 – February 25, 1994
FMW Independent Women's Championship	February 25, 1994 – September 28, 1997
FMW Independent / WWA World Women's Championship	February 25, 1994 – September 28, 1997

=== Reigns ===
Key
No.	Overall reign number
Reign	Reign number for the specific champion
Days	Number of days held
<1	Reign lasted less than a day

No.	Champion	Championship change			Reign statistics		Notes	Ref.
No.	Champion	Date	Event	Location	Reign	Days	Notes	Ref.
1	Combat Toyoda	November 5, 1990	1st Anniversary Show	Tokyo, Japan	1	143	Defeated Beastie the Road Warrior to become the first WWA World Women's Champion	
2	Megumi Kudo	March 28, 1991	FMW	Tokyo, Japan	1	142		
3	Combat Toyoda	August 17, 1991	FMW	Tokyo, Japan	2	58		
4	Miwa Sato	October 14, 1991	FMW	Tokyo, Japan	1	163		
5	Shark Tsuchiya	March 25, 1992	FMW	Tokyo, Japan	1	60		
6	Megumi Kudo	May 24, 1992	FMW	Tokyo, Japan	2	426		
7	Combat Toyoda	July 24, 1993	FMW	Kitakyushu, Japan	3	99		
8	Crusher Maedomari	October 31, 1993	FMW	Tokyo, Japan	1	103		
—	Vacated	February 11, 1994	FMW	Fukaya, Japan	—	—	Crusher Maedomari vacated the title due to the creation of a new FMW Independent World Women's Championship and the vacant WWA World Women's Championship would also be decided in the tournament.	
9	Megumi Kudo	February 25, 1994	FMW	Tokyo, Japan	3	128	Defeated Leilani Kai to become the first FMW Independent World Women's Champion and win the vacant WWA World Women's Championship. Both titles were unified and defend it as one and the same lineage continued.	
10	Combat Toyoda	June 19, 1994	FMW	Tokyo, Japan	4	70		
11	Yukie Nabeno	August 28, 1994	Summer Spectacular	Osaka, Japan	1	106		
—	Vacated	December 12, 1994	—	—	—	—		
12	Bad Nurse Nakamura	March 30, 1995	FMW	Yokohama, Japan	1	36	Defeated Megumi Kudo for the vacant titles.	
13	Megumi Kudo	May 5, 1995	6th Anniversary Show	Kawasaki, Japan	4	199		
14	Shark Tsuchiya	November 20, 1995	FMW	Fukuoka, Japan	2	20		
15	Combat Toyoda	December 10, 1995	FMW	Tokyo, Japan	5	147		
16	Megumi Kudo	May 5, 1996	7th Anniversary Show	Kawasaki, Japan	5	320	This was a no ropes exploding barbed wire deathmatch and Combat Toyoda's retirement match.	
17	Shark Tsuchiya	March 21, 1997	Winning Road tour	Sendai, Miyagi	3	39		
18	Megumi Kudo	April 29, 1997	8th Anniversary Show	Yokohama, Japan	6	45	This was a no rope 200 volt double hell double barbed wire barricade double landmine crushed glass electrical barbed wire deathmatch and Megumi Kudo's retirement match.	
—	Vacated	June 13, 1997	King of Fight tour	Tokyo, Japan	—	—	Megumi Kudo vacated the titles at her retirement ceremony due to retirement.	
19	Shark Tsuchiya	September 28, 1997	Fall Spectacular	Kawasaki, Japan	4	<1	Defeated Aja Kong for vacant titles. This was the final match of the Women's Championship titles and the titles were retired after the match.	
—	Deactivated	September 28, 1997	Fall Spectacular	Kawasaki, Japan	—	—	The titles were retired after the match.	

== Combined reigns ==
Rank	Wrestler	No. of reigns	Combined days
1	Megumi Kudo	6	1,246
2	Combat Toyoda	5	517
3	Miwa Sato	1	163
4	Shark Tsuchiya	4	119
5	Yukie Nabeno	1	106
6	Crusher Maedomari	1	103
7	Bad Nurse Nakamura	1	36

== See also ==
- IWGP Women's Championship, a women's championship in a male-majority promotion (New Japan Pro Wrestling)
