= FMW Brass Knuckles Tag Team Championship =

Professional wrestling tag team championship

Details
- Promotion: Frontier Martial-Arts Wrestling
- Date established: December 9, 1991
- Date retired: June 16, 1999

Other name
- WWA World Martial Arts Tag Team Championship
Statistics
- First champions: Atsushi Onita and Tarzan Goto
- Most reigns: W*ING Kanemura/Yukihiro Kanemura (5 reigns)
- Longest reign: The Headhunters (Headhunter A and Headhunter B) (391 days)
- Shortest reign: Koji Nakagawa and Gedo (3 days)

The FMW Brass Knuckles Tag Team Championship was a tag team hardcore wrestling championship contested in Frontier Martial-Arts Wrestling.

== Title history ==
=== Names ===
Name	Years
WWA World Martial Arts Tag Team Championship	December 9, 1991–September 19, 1992
FMW Brass Knuckles Tag Team Championship	January 18, 1994–June 13, 1999

=== Reigns ===
No:	Wrestlers:	Reigns:	Date:	Days held:	Location:	Event:	Notes:
1	Atsushi Onita and Tarzan Goto	1	December 9, 1991	150	Tokyo, Japan	FMW	Onita and Goto defeated Grigory Verichev and Koba Kurtanidze in the finals of a World's Strongest Tag Team Tournament to become the first WWA World Martial Arts Tag Team Champions.
2	Sabu and Horace Boulder	1	May 7, 1992	17	Tokyo, Japan	FMW	
3	Tarzan Goto (2) and Grigory Verichev	1	May 25, 1992	117	Tokyo, Japan	FMW	
—	Abandoned	—	September 19, 1992	—	Yokohama, Kanagawa	3rd Anniversary Show	The title was abandoned after the 3rd Anniversary Show.
4	Big Titan and The Gladiator	1	January 18, 1994	93	Saitama, Japan	FMW	The title was re-installed as FMW Brass Knuckles Tag Team Championship. Titan and Gladiator defeated Atsushi Onita and Katsutoshi Niiyama in a tournament final to win the vacant title.
5	Mr. Pogo and Hisakatsu Oya	1	April 21, 1994	101	Aomori, Japan	FMW	
6	Atsushi Onita (2) and Mitsuhiro Matsunaga	1	July 31, 1994	(Note: The exact date when Atsushi Onita and Mitsuhiro Matsunaga vacated the title is uncertain, which means that their reign lasted between 62 and 89 days.)	Yokohama, Japan	FMW	
—	Vacated	—	October 1994	—	—	FMW	The title was vacated when Onita and Matsunaga split up.
7	W*ING Alliance (Mr. Pogo (2) and The Gladiator (2))	1	October 28, 1994	119	Tokyo, Japan	FMW	Pogo and Gladiator defeated Atsushi Onita and Mr. Gannosuke for vacant title.
8	Atsushi Onita (3) and Mr. Gannosuke	1	February 24, 1995	11	Tokyo, Japan	FMW	
9	W*ING Alliance (Mr. Pogo (3) and Yukihiro Kanemura)	1	March 7, 1995	59	Iwate, Japan	FMW	
10	Lethal Weapon (Ricky Fuji and Hisakatsu Oya (2))	1	May 5, 1995	123	Kawasaki, Japan	6th Anniversary Show	
11	Daisuke Ikeda and Yoshiaki Fujiwara	1	September 5, 1995	107	Sapporo, Japan	Grand Slam Tour	
12	Lethal Weapon (Hisakatsu Oya (3) and Horace Boulder)	1	December 21, 1995	15	Yokohama, Japan	Year End Spectacular	
13	The Faces of Dead (Super Leather and Jason the Terrible)	1	January 5, 1996	85	Tokyo, Japan	FMW	
14	The Headhunters (A and B)	1	March 30, 1996	391	Tokyo, Japan	FMW	
15	W*ING Alliance (W*ING Kanemura (2) and Hido)	1	April 25, 1997	118	Osaka, Japan	Fighting Creation Tour	
16	Funk Masters of Wrestling (Mr. Gannosuke (2) and Hisakatsu Oya (4))	1	August 21, 1997	59	Yokosuka, Japan	Super Dynamism Tour	
17	ZEN (Atsushi Onita (3) and Yukihiro Kanemura (3))	1	October 19, 1997	(Note: The exact date when Atsushi Onita and Yukihiro Kanemura vacated the title is uncertain, which means that their reign lasted between 13 and 40 days.)	Sendai, Japan	Power Splash Tour	
—	Vacated	—	November 1997	—	—	—	Onita and Kanemura were stripped of the title due to Onita's inactivity.
18	ZEN/Team No Respect (Mr. Gannosuke (3) and Yukihiro Kanemura (4))	1	November 28, 1997	121	Tokyo, Japan	Scramble Survivor Tour	Defeated Hayabusa and Masato Tanaka for the vacant title.
19	Team No Respect (Kodo Fuyuki and Hido (2))	1	March 29, 1998	19	Niigata, Japan	Winning Road Tour	
20	Hayabusa and Masato Tanaka	1	April 17, 1998	40	Sapporo, Japan	Fuyuki Army	
21	Team No Respect (Kodo Fuyuki (2) and Yukihiro Kanemura (5))	1	May 27, 1998	152	Fukuoka, Japan	Neo FMW	
21	Hayabusa (2) and Daisuke Ikeda (2)	1	October 26, 1998	(Note: The exact date when Hayabusa and Daisuke Ikeda vacated the title is uncertain, which means that their reign lasted between 67 and 97 days.)	Chiba, Japan	Fuyuki Army	
—	Vacated	—	January 1999	—	—	—	Title vacated due to Ikeda's health problems.
22	Masato Tanaka (2) and Tetsuhiro Kuroda	1	May 3, 1999	41	Nagoya, Japan	Strongest Tag League Tour	Defeated Hayabusa and Kodo Fuyuki in an eight-team round-robin tournament final for vacant title.
23	Team No Respect (Koji Nakagawa and Gedo)	1	June 13, 1999	3	Okayama, Japan	Making of a New Legend Tour	
—	Retired	—	June 16, 1999	—	Chiba, Japan	Making of a New Legend Tour	The title was replaced with the WEW World Tag Team Championship.
