= Miwa Sato =

Japanese professional wrestler (born 1966)

Personal information
- Born: August 8, 1966 (age 59) Naze, Kagoshima Prefecture, Japan

Professional wrestling career
- Ring name: Miwa Sato
- Billed height: 1.56 m (5 ft 1 in)
- Billed weight: 52 kg (115 lb)
- Trained by: Tarzan Goto
- Debut: October 6, 1989
- Retired: December 22, 1997

Miwa Sato (里美和, born August 8, 1966) is a retired Japanese female professional wrestler, who spent her entire career in Frontier Martial Arts Wrestling.

== Professional wrestling career ==
Trained by Tarzan Goto at the Frontier Martial Arts Wrestling Dojo, Miwa Sato debuted at the first FMW event on October 6, 1989, in a three on one handicap match teaming with the dojo mates Eriko Tsuchiya and Kumiko Matsuda. On May 19, 1990, she and Yuki Morimatsu lost a loser-of-the fall-loses-hair match to Megumi Kudo and Reibun Amada, where Morimatsu lost the fall, thus Sato's hair was safe.

On October 14, 1991, Sato won her only championship, the WWA World Women's Championship, defeating Combat Toyoda. She would hold onto the title for over five months, before losing the title to Eriko Tsuchiya. In May 1992, she wrestled two shows in North America, the first night in Tijuana, Mexico, and the second night in Los Angeles, California, in the United States, as FMW talent was collaborating with the World Wrestling Association. In 1993, she wrestled a couple shows for Ladies Legend Pro-Wrestling.

By the summer of 1995, after spending nearly six years as a babyface, second only to Megumi Kudo, she turned heel by revealing herself as the mystery partner of Bad Nurse Nakamura against Kudo and Toyoda on July 27, in turn joined Shark Tsuchiya's Mad Dog Military. By 1997, Kudo had retired, and FMW had given up on their Women's division, and Sato wrestled her retirement match on December 22, 1997, losing to Mad Dog Military stablemate Miss Mongol.

== Retirement ==
After retiring from professional wrestling, Sato attended an Evangelical college, where she graduated in 2001 after three years of classes. She is now a member of the Protestant-based Japan Assemblies of God. She has also been a missionary for the AG Soka Shinsho Church.

== Championships and accomplishments ==
- Frontier Martial Arts Wrestling
  - WWA World Women's Championship (1 time)
