= Noriyo Toyoda =

Japanese professional wrestler (born 1967)

Combat Toyoda
Personal information
- Born: Noriyo Toyoda; October 26, 1967 (age 58) Koshigaya, Saitama, Japan

Professional wrestling career
- Ring name(s): Combat Toyoda; Noriyo Toyoda
- Billed height: 1.68 m (5 ft 6 in)
- Billed weight: 80 kg (180 lb)
- Trained by: Jaguar Yokota
- Debut: September 17, 1986
- Retired: May 5, 1996

Noriyo Toyoda (豊田 記代, born October 26, 1967) is a Japanese retired professional wrestler, best known under the name Combat Toyoda (コンバット豊田). She spent much of her career in Frontier Martial Arts Wrestling.

== Professional wrestling career ==
Trained by Jaguar Yokota in the All Japan Women's Pro Wrestling Dojo, Noriyo Toyoda debuted on September 17, 1986, against the future Aja Kong, Erika Shishido. That same year, she was named Rookie of the Year by the promotion. However, by 1988, she was passed over by the promotion and left the promotion. After a couple years in a hiatus, Toyoda, alongside her fellow AJW dojo mates Megumi Kudo and Reibun Amada, was asked by Atsushi Onita to join Frontier Martial Arts Wrestling. The three debuted in March 1990 as a trio under the name "The Outbreakers."

It was not until July 16, 1990, that Toyoda began to change. She and Reibun Amada turned on Megumi Kudo, and a month later, developed a punk look and adopted the name "Combat Toyoda" by Onita. On November 5, 1990, Toyoda defeated former GLOW wrestler Beastie the Road Warrior to become the inaugural WWA World Women's Champion. In January 1991, she formed her own army with Eriko Tsuchiya, Yoshika Maedomari, Canadian Delta Dawn, and American Reggie Bennett. After nearly five months as champion, she lost the title to Kudo on March 28, 1991. However, she regained the title nearly three months later on August 17. Unfortunately, her second reign didn't last as long as her first, as she lost the title to Miwa Sato on October 14, after nearly two months as champion.

In July 1992, Toyoda's group split up, with Toyoda eventually reuniting with Megumi Kudo, feuding with Eriko Tsuchiya and Yoshika Maedomari. Two months later, Toyoda and Kudo took part in Japan's first inter-promotional Joshi tag team match, in a loss to AJW's Akira Hokuto and Bull Nakano. In June 1993, Toyoda turned heel and reunited with Tsuchiya and Maedomari, reforming her group under a different name, Mad Dog Military. A month later on July 28, she defeated Kudo to win her third WWA Championship.She would hold onto the title for over three months, before losing the title to Mad Dog Military stablemate Maedomari, now going by the name Crusher Maedomari. It wouldn't be until June 19, 1994, when Toyoda regained the WWA Championship for the fourth time, as well as her first FMW Independent Women's Championship, by defeating Kudo. She would hold onto both belts for over two months, before losing them in an upset to Yukie Nabeno. Over a week later, on September 7, Tsuchiya and Maedomari turned on Toyoda, turning her face for the remainder of her career.

Once again reunited with Megumi Kudo against the Mad Dog Military, Toyoda regained the titles from Eriko Tsuchiya, now going by the name Shark Tsuchiya, on December 10, 1995. However, by that time, Toyoda has been hinting at retiring soon. She would hold onto the titles for nearly five months, before losing her retirement match, the Exploding Barbed Wire Deathmatch, and the titles, to Kudo. Atsushi Onita would carry Toyoda on his back after the match. She would have her retirement ceremony a month later on June 28, 1996.

== Retirement ==
After retiring from professional wrestling, Toyoda became a restaurateur. She started out by opening a ramen shop. In August 2013, she opened a Korean barbecue restaurant in Amagasaki, Hyogo, Japan.

== Championships and accomplishments ==
- All Japan Women's Pro Wrestling
  - Rookie of the Year (1986)
- Frontier Martial Arts Wrestling
  - WWA World Women's Championship (5 times, first champion)
  - FMW Independent World Women's Championship (3 times)
