= Shark Tsuchiya =

Japanese professional wrestler (born 1970)

Shark Tsuchiya シャーク土屋
Personal information
- Born: Eriko Tsuchiya; February 19, 1970 (age 56) Nerima, Tokyo, Japan

Professional wrestling career
- Ring name(s): Eriko Tsuchiya; Shark Tsuchiya
- Billed height: 1.69 m (5 ft 7 in)
- Billed weight: 88 kg (194 lb)
- Trained by: Tarzan Goto
- Debut: October 6, 1989
- Retired: November 24, 2016

Eriko Tsuchiya (土屋 恵理子, born February 19, 1970) is a Japanese retired professional wrestler better known by the ring name Shark Tsuchiya (シャーク土屋). She spent most of her career working for Frontier Martial Arts Wrestling.

== Professional wrestling career ==
=== Frontier Martial Arts Wrestling (1989–1998) ===
Trained by Tarzan Goto in the FMW Dojo, Eriko Tsuchiya debuted on the very first Frontier Martial Arts Wrestling show on October 6, 1989, losing a four-way match to Witch Warrior, which also saw Miwa Sato and Kumiko Matsuda debut as well. Tsuchiya spent the first year teaming with Matsuda until March 1990, when Yoshika Maedomari debuted, and she began teaming with Maedomari. In March 1992, she defeated Miwa Sato to win her first championship, the WWA World Women's Championship, which she held for nearly two months, before losing it to Megumi Kudo.

In July 1993, she evolved into an evil hardcore wrestler named Shark Tsuchiya. Adopting the hardcore style reminiscent of Mr. Pogo, Tsuchiya quickly became the top female heel of FMW, going through a long-running feud its top female babyface, Megumi Kudo. In November 1995, she regained the WWA World Women's Championship, which is now unified with the Independent World Women's Championship, from Kudo, and held it for a month, before losing both titles to Combat Toyoda. It wouldn't be until March 1997 that she regained the titles from Kudo, only to lose them over a month later to Kudo in her retirement match. Although she would regain the titles in September 1997, defeating Aja Kong in a decision match, FMW abandoned the titles and the Women's division, and Tsuchiya left the company in June 1998.

=== Various Promotions (1998–2010) ===
After leaving FMW in 1998, Tsuchiya began wrestling for various promotions as a freelancer, such as All Japan Women's Pro Wrestling, JDStar, Ladies Legend Pro-Wrestling, Onita Pro Wrestling, Dramatic Dream Team, NEO Ladies, IWA Japan, JWP Joshi Puroresu, Onita FMW, World Entertainment Wrestling, OZ Academy, GAEA Japan, Wrestling Marvelous Future, and Super FMW.

=== Hiatus and retirement (2010–present) ===
Tsuchiya wrestled her final match in August 2010 with Super FMW. In November 2016, she held an official retirement ceremony in Korakuen Hall at an event promoted by FMW.

== Personal life ==
In August 2015, Tsuchiya was diagnosed with type 1 diabetes. In October 2015, she was forced to have her right leg amputated below the knee due to gangrene (she originally had three toes removed from her right foot before the final amputation). In May 2016, her right breast was removed due to breast cancer.

== Championships and accomplishments ==
- DDT Pro-Wrestling
  - Ironman Heavymetalweight Championship (1 time)
- Frontier Martial Arts Wrestling
  - WWA World Women's Championship (4 times)
  - FMW Independent World Women's Championship (3 times)
- Tokyo Sports
  - Joshi Puroresu Grand Prize (1997)
