= Megumi Kudo =

Japanese professional wrestler (born 1969)

Personal information
- Born: Megumi Kudo; September 20, 1969 (age 57) Koshigaya, Saitama, Japan
- Spouse: Hido (m. 1998; died 2021)

Professional wrestling career
- Ring name: Megumi Kudo
- Billed height: 1.63 m (5 ft 4 in)
- Billed weight: 60 kg (132 lb)
- Trained by: Jaguar Yokota
- Debut: August 8, 1986
- Retired: April 29, 1997

Megumi Takayama (高山 めぐみ, Takayama Megumi; née Kudo (工藤), born September 20, 1969) is a Japanese entertainment personality and former professional wrestler. She wrestled under her maiden name for Frontier Martial Arts Wrestling (FMW), where she became the top star of the Women's Division. Kudo is primarily known for competing in brutal death matches, where the ring ropes were replaced with barbed wire.

== Professional wrestling career ==
Kudo played basketball in high school. She joined All Japan Women's Pro-Wrestling at the age of 16, but did not achieve any substantial success. Kudo was released in March 1988. Following her release, Kudo worked as a kindergarten teacher. Kudo returned to wrestling in March 1990 with Frontier Martial Arts Wrestling (FMW). Kudo participated in Japan's first mixed tag team match in October 1990, teaming with Ricky Fuji in a losing effort to Tarzan Goto and Despina Montagas. Her notable feuds were against Shark Tsuchiya, Combat Toyoda and Sumie Sakai. In 1992, Kudo released a music album titled Keep On Running, and starred in the action film A Human Murder Weapon.

On December 6, 1993, Kudo returned to All Japan Women's Pro-Wrestling for one night, losing to WWWA World Champion Aja Kong. Kudo competed in her retirement match on April 29, 1997, against Tsuchiya. The match was contested in a "No Ropes Barbed-Wire Double Landmine Glass Crush Death Match". Kudo officially vacated both of her title belts in a retirement ceremony on June 13, 1997.

== Retirement ==
After retiring from professional wrestling, Kudo worked on various television programs, including as a color commentator for pro wrestling events. She also hosts a weekly radio show in Japan. Kudo married professional wrestler Hido on July 12, 1998, whom she met while in FMW; they remained married until his death in 2021. In July 2020, she became the general manager of Pro Wrestling Zero1, until the promotion was sold in December 2024.

== Championships and accomplishments ==
- Frontier Martial Arts Wrestling
  - WWA World Women's Championship (6 times)
  - FMW Independent World Women's Championship (4 times)
  - FMW Independent Women's / WWA World Women's Championship Tournament (1994)
- Tokyo Sports
  - Service Award (1997)
