= FMW 7th Anniversary Show =

1996 Frontier Martial-Arts Wrestling event

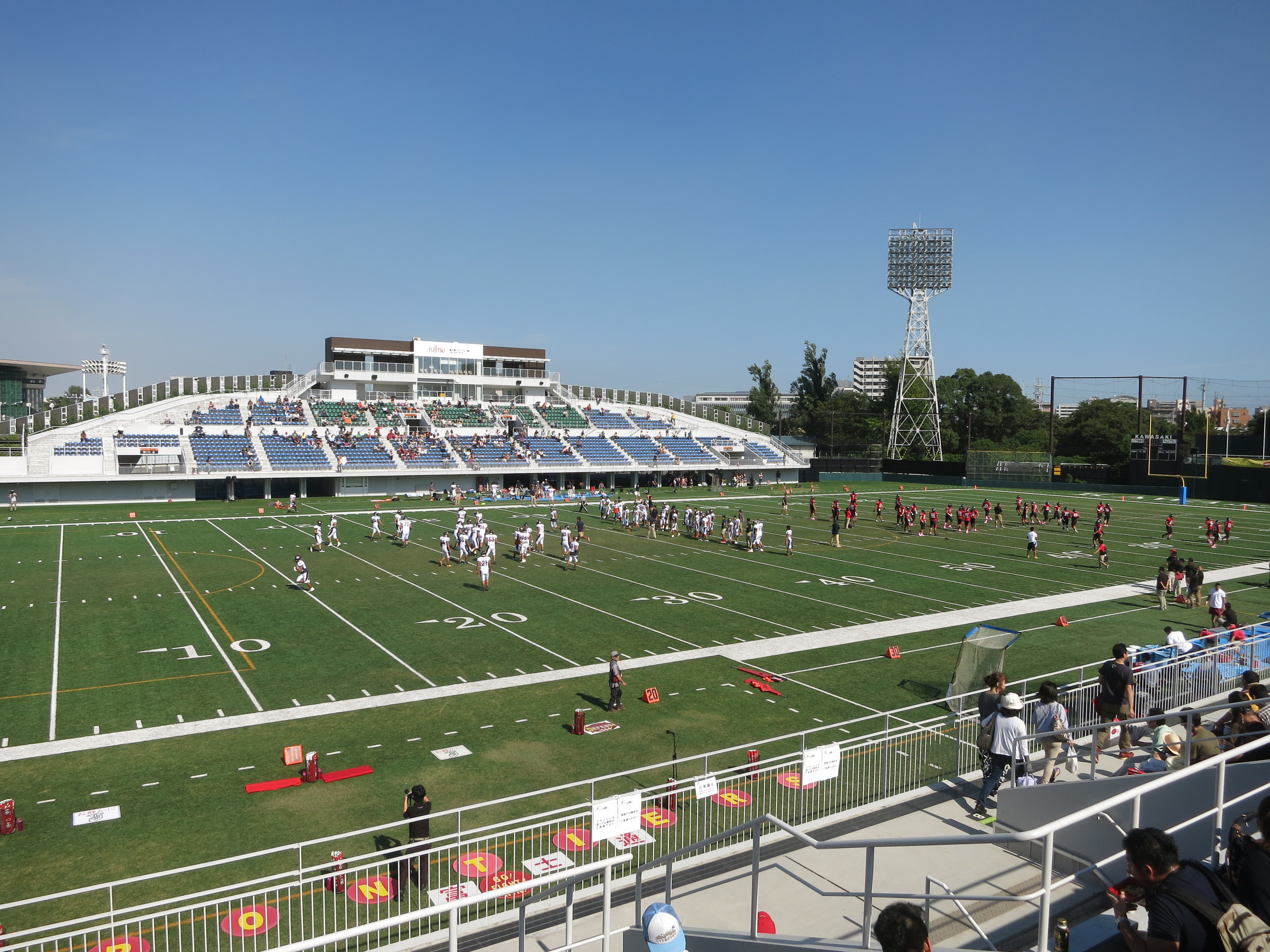
- Kawasaki Stadium
- Promotion: Frontier Martial-Arts Wrestling
- Date: May 5, 1996
- City: Kawasaki, Kanagawa, Japan
- Venue: Kawasaki Stadium
- Attendance: 33,231

Event chronology
← Previous; Yamato Nadeshiko III	Next → Summer Spectacular

FMW Anniversary Show chronology
← Previous; 6th Anniversary	Next → 8th Anniversary

FMW 7th Anniversary Show was a professional wrestling event produced by Frontier Martial-Arts Wrestling (FMW), taking place on May 5, 1996 at the Kawasaki Stadium in Kawasaki, Kanagawa, Japan. This was the seventh edition of the company's flagship event Anniversary Show, commemorating the seventh anniversary of the company and the fourth consecutive and fifth overall edition of Anniversary Show at Kawasaki Stadium.

The main event was a one million yen no rope explosive barbed wire time bomb land mine double hell death match between FMW's Hayabusa and Masato Tanaka and the Puerto Rican Army's Terry Funk and Mr. Pogo. Funk and Pogo claimed the win for the Puerto Rican Army. This was the first Anniversary Show, which took place without the company's founder and former owner Atsushi Onita. The event also featured the last match of Combat Toyoda, as she defended the FMW Independent and WWA World Women's Championship against Megumi Kudo in a No Ropes Exploding Barbed Wire Deathmatch. Toyoda lost the title to Kudo and retired from wrestling after the event. Cactus Jack retained his IWA King of the Death Match Championship against W*ING Kanemura in a Caribbean Barbed Wire Barricade Spider Net Glass Deathmatch.

== Background ==
The card featured twelve professional wrestling matches that resulted from scripted storylines featuring wrestlers portray either heroes or villains and involve in rivalries against each other.

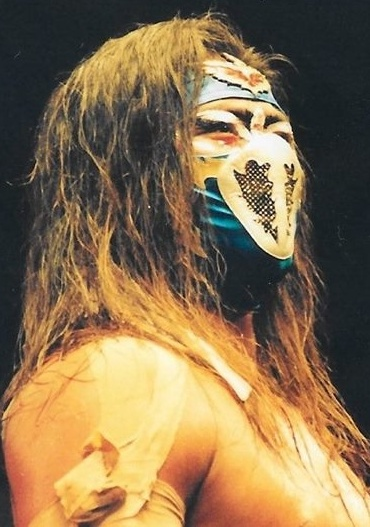
Hayabusa headlined his second straight Anniversary Show by teaming with Masato Tanaka.

On February 23, 1996, the FMW team of Masato Tanaka and Tetsuhiro Kuroda teamed with Lethal Weapon's Ricky Fuji to defeat W*ING Alliance members Mitsuhiro Matsunaga, W*ING Kanemura and Hido in FMW's first WarGames match to conclude FMW's rivalry with W*ING. After the match, Víctor Quiñones returned to FMW and led a storyline IWA Japan-invasion of FMW in which The Headhunters made their FMW debut and attacked FMW and W*ING wrestlers and became the first members of Quinones' Puerto Rican Army, which would become the top villainous stable in FMW. The group would quickly lure away W*ING and Lethal Weapon members including Mr. Pogo, Super Leather and The Gladiator. Shoji Nakamaki was introduced as Puerto Rican Army's newest member on March 15 as he teamed with Headhunter A to defeat Masato Tanaka and Koji Nakagawa. After the match, Mr. Pogo launched a brutal assault on Tanaka by wrapping a chain around his neck and hang him which led Atsushi Onita to make his one-time return to FMW following his retirement at 6th Anniversary Show and he made the save against Puerto Rican Army by smashing a piece of table on its members and encouraged FMW to challenge and fight the Puerto Rican Army at the 7th Anniversary Show. On March 30, Super Leather turned on his W*ING teammate Jason the Terrible during a Brass Knuckles Tag Team Championship defense against The Headhunters, causing Leather and Jason to lose the titles and Leather defected to Puerto Rican Army. After the match, Puerto Rican Army attacked W*ING which led FMW wrestlers to make the save along with Hayabusa, who returned to the company after being injured on January 10. Hayabusa and Masato Tanaka challenged Puerto Rican Army's Mr. Pogo and a partner of his choice to a No Ropes Exploding Barbed Wire Double Hell Exploding Deathmatch at 7th Anniversary Show and the winning team would receive one million yens. Terry Funk was brought back to FMW as Pogo's partner, marking his return to the company for the first time since 5th Anniversary Show in 1994.

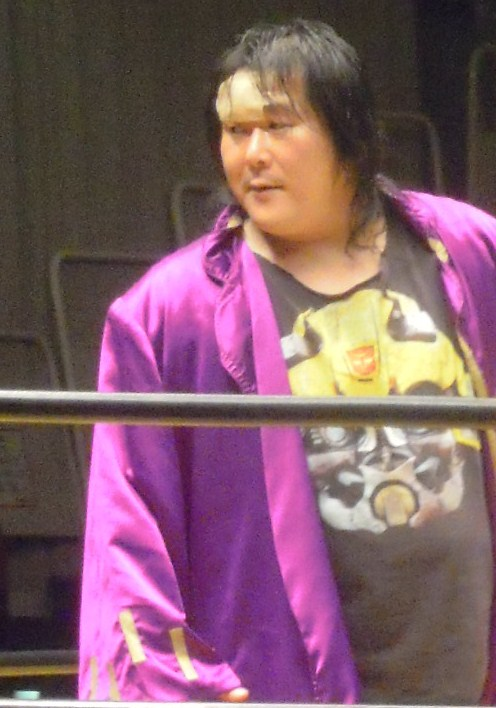
W*ING Kanemura replaced Mitsuhiro Matsunaga to be Cactus Jack's opponent in one of the three main event matches of the 7th Anniversary Show.

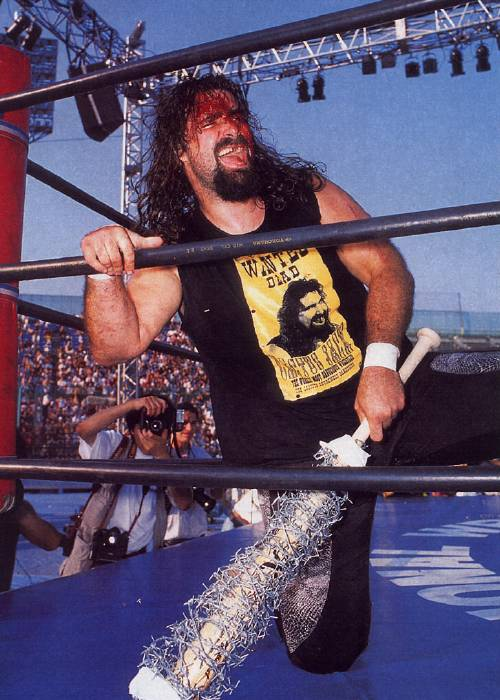
Cactus Jack replaced Abdullah the Butcher to be Mitsuhiro Matsunaga's original opponent and retained his IWA King of the Deathmatch Championship against Matsunaga's replacement W*ING Kanemura.

Megumi Kudo defeated Bad Nurse Nakamura to win the FMW Women's Championship at 6th Anniversary Show. She dropped the title to Shark Tsuchiya on November 20, who would lose the belt to Combat Toyoda on December 10. On March 30, 1996, Toyoda defeated Bison Kimura and then announced that she would retire at the 7th Anniversary Show and challenged Kudo to a No Ropes Exploding Barbed Wire Deathmatch as she wanted Kudo to be her last opponent for the Women's Championship. This would be the first match of such genre between the two women with Kudo accepting the challenge for 7th Anniversary Show. Toyoda and Kudo had their last encounter against each other before the event at FMW's women's only show Yamato Nadeshiko III, where Toyoda and Chigusa Nagayo defeated Kudo and KAORU.

Mitsuhiro Matsunaga was scheduled to compete against Abdullah the Butcher in a Caribbean Barbed Wire Barricade Spider Net Glass Deathmatch but then FMW replaced Butcher with Cactus Jack. However, the plan was scrapped after Matsunaga gave his resignation notice and Jack's employer World Wrestling Federation (WWF) did not allow Jack to compete against Matsunaga due to Matsunaga being contracted with hepatitis B. FMW then replaced Matsunaga with his W*ING alliance teammate W*ING Kanemura as Jack's opponent with Jack's King of the Deathmatch trophy on the line which he won in IWA Japan in 1995.

On February 23, 1996, Koji Nakagawa and The Wild Shooter defeated Kaientai Deluxe members Taka Michinoku and Shoichi Funaki and after the match, Kaientai stole Nakagawa's Independent World Junior Heavyweight Championship belt to begin a feud with Nakagawa over the title, thus setting up a match between Nakagawa and Michinoku for the title at 7th Anniversary Show. Nakagawa successfully defended the title against Funaki on April 21.

== Event ==
=== Preliminary matches ===
In the opening match, Jason the Terrible took on Hayato Nanjyo. Nanjyo used his high-flying skills to keep the pace slower and performed a series of moonsaults on Jason. Nanjyo attempted a corkscrew senton bomb on his opponent but missed it and then Jason dropped his opponent with a sitout powerbomb and then tried another but Nanjyo countered with a Frankensteiner. Jason performed another powerbomb on Nanjyo and followed it with a lariat and a scoop brainbuster to win the match.

In an interpromotional women's match, the team of Aki Kambayashi and Kaori Nakayama represented FMW against All Japan Women's Pro-Wrestling's (AJW) Chaparita Asari and Yumi Fukawa. Nakayama performed a moonsault and a plancha on Asari, who then hit her own plancha and delivered a corkscrew senton bomb to get the win for AJW.

The team of Kamikaze, Katsutoshi Niiyama and Wild Shooter took on Daisuke Ikeda, Shoichi Funaki and Tetsuhiro Kuroda. After a back and forth action, Niiyama finished Kuroda with a lariat and a Ura-nage to win the match.

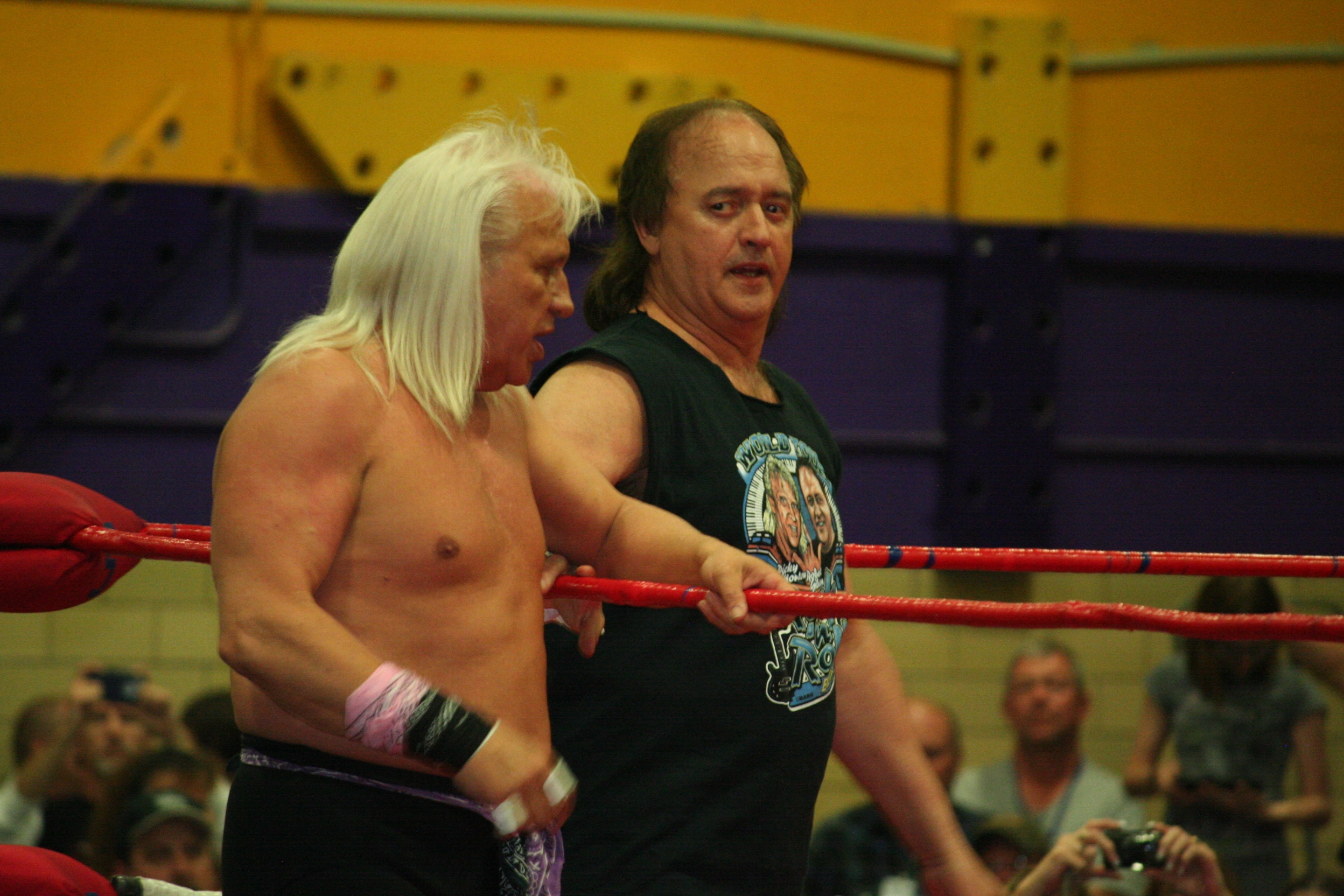
The Rock 'n' Roll Express won their six-man tag team match at the event.

Lethal Weapon's Ricky Fuji teamed with The Rock 'n' Roll Express to take on Puerto Rican Army's Freddy Krueger, Crypt Keeper and Boogie Man. Rock n Roll Express delivered a Rocket Launcher on Boogie Man for the victory.

Ryuma Go and Samurai Max took on the alien tag team of I Maijin and Uchu Maijin Silver X. Go roughed up the Maijins and then tagged in Samurai Max, who was beaten up by the Maijins throughout the match. Near the end of the match, Go was tagged in and he performed a series of lariats before delivering a backdrop suplex to I Maijin and pinned him by rolling his legs.

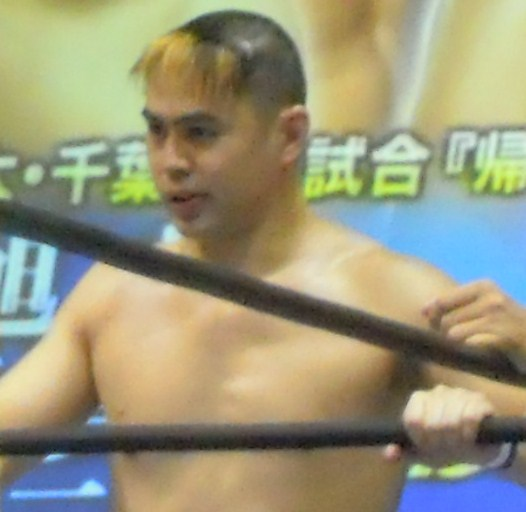
Taka Michinoku defeated Koji Nakagawa in a highly critically acclaimed match to win the Independent World Junior Heavyweight Championship at the event.

Koji Nakagawa defended the FMW Independent World Junior Heavyweight Championship against Taka Michinoku in the first championship match of the event. After a back and forth high-flying action during the earlier part of the match, Nakagawa applied a Scorpion Deathhold on Michinoku and Michinoku got out of the move after struggling into it. Both men exchanged many moves for the latter part of the match and Nakagawa performed a tiger suplex but got a near-fall. Michinoku delivered a Michinoku Driver II to Nakagawa to get a near-fall and then Michinoku performed a springboard dropkick and a second Michinoku Driver II to win the title.

Shark Tsuchiya represented FMW against GAEA's Chigusa Nagayo in an interpromotional street fight. Shark brutalized Nagayo with a flaming pole and carved her back with the pole and then attempted a fireball on Nagayo but Nagayo kicked her. The action spilled to the ringside where Nagayo delivered a Piledriver to Tsuchiya through the table. Tsuchiya attempted to make a comeback by trying to carve Nagayo's back with her pole but Nagayo countered by striking Tsuchiya with her bullrope and then gained momentum with a sleeper hold and applied a cross armbar to knock Tsuchiya out and the referee stopped the match to award the win to Nagayo.

The W*ING Alliance members Hideki Hosaka, Hido and Mitsuhiro Matsunaga took on Puerto Rican Army's Miguel Perez, Shoji Nakamaki and Toryu. During the match, Hido attempted to tear off Toryu's mask but Toryu fought back and prevented him from doing so. Both teams brawled with each other and Matsunaga and Nakamaki had a wild brawl as they did not sell each other's chair shots. Hosaka performed a Frankensteiner to Toryu from the top rope and W*ING Alliance continued their momentum against Toryu with an aided superbomb. Matsunaga delivered a sitout powerbomb to Toryu after some more brawling to win the match.

Lethal Weapon members Hisakatsu Oya, Horace Boulder and The Gladiator took on Puerto Rican Army's Super Leather and The Headhunters in a Street Fight for the inaugural FMW World Street Fight 6-Man Tag Team Championship. Both teams had a back and forth brawl with several moves and they exchanged momentum throughout the match. Near the end of the match, Leather hit a one shoulder powerbomb to Horace and followed it with a brainbuster to win the match as he and Headhunters became the inaugural World Street Fight 6-Man Tag Team Champions.

=== Main event matches ===
Cactus Jack defended his IWA King of the Death Match Championship (which he won in a tournament at IWA Japan's Kawasaki Dream event in 1995) against W*ING Kanemura in a Caribbean Barbed Wire Barricade Spider Net Glass Deathmatch. Jack suplexed Kanemura into the spider net as the match began and then delivered a diving elbow drop to Kanemura with a steel chair. Jack grabbed a board to hit Kanemura with it but Kanemura grabbed it and hit him with it. The two tossed each other into the barricades and spider nets throughout the match and used the structure to gain advantage. Near the end of the match, Jack threw a broken glass structure into the ring and delivered a double arm DDT to Kanemura on the piece of glass retain the title.

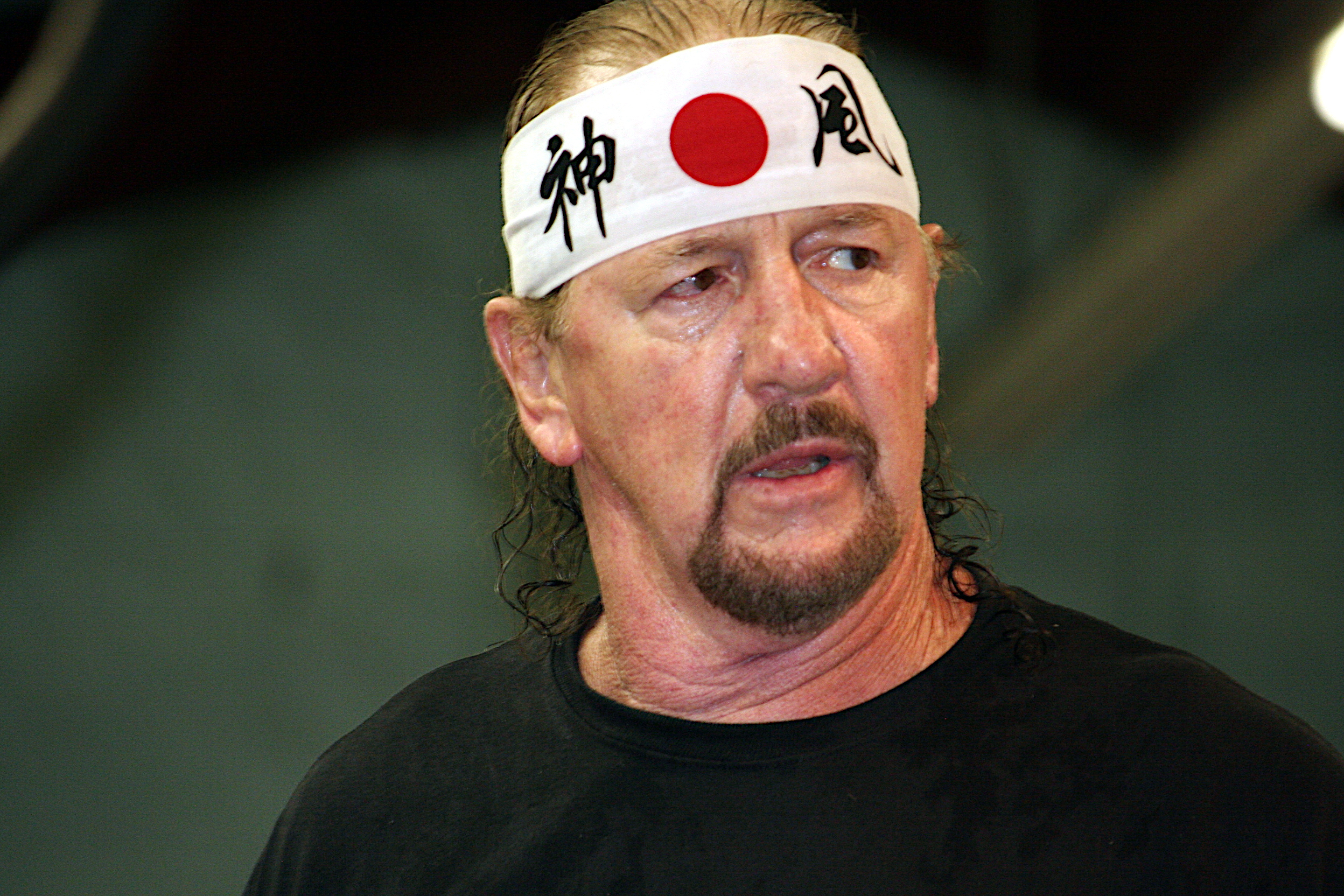
Terry Funk picked up the pinfall win for his team in the main event.

Combat Toyoda defended the FMW Women's Championship against Megumi Kudo in a No Ropes Exploding Barbed Wire Deathmatch in what was Toyoda's retirement match. Explosives were placed in the barbed wires as the match began. Several explosions took place during the match and both women traded moves and momentum shifted between both of them through the duration of the match. Near the end of the match, Toyoda delivered a double underhook powerbomb to Kudo to gain a near-fall and then Kudo countered with a Ganso bomb and performed a Kudo Driver on Toyoda to win the title.

In the main event of the show, Hayabusa and Masato Tanaka took on Puerto Rican Army's Mr. Pogo and Terry Funk in a No Ropes Exploding Barbed Wire Double Hell Exploding Deathmatch, where the winning team would win one million yens where the ring would explode after every fifteen minutes. Mid-way through the match, Pogo poured liquid on Tanaka to blast him with a fireball but Hayabusa made the save as he and Pogo suffered the fireball explosion in a barricade. Near the end of the match, Funk performed a Powerbomb on Hayabusa to win the match.

== Reception ==
Stuart of Puroresu Central called it a "massive show", with "twelve long matches, with even the shortest passing 8 minutes". He further wrote that the event "was a definite variety-fest with a little something for everyone. It was a mixed bag, but there were a few really good matches that make the tape worth obtaining. Outside involvement helped the show become a memorable and historic one, giving it a grand aura. A lot of people frown at garbage wrestling, which is cool (it's better to approach each style with an open mind), but I think a lot of non-garbage fans would enjoy Kudo vs. Toyoda, because it was very wrestling-driven". He criticized the main event wrestling wise but considered it "enjoyable" for hardcore wrestling fans. He appreciated the Women's Championship match because he thought "the wrestling was primary here and the explosions were made to look as deadly as possible, with both selling them to perfection" and praised it as a "brutal, great match with tons of drama and a great storyline" and also had positive reviews for the Independent World Junior Heavyweight Championship match with "strong matwork, clear focus and great execution" and the opening match of the event was a "fine opener" in his opinion.

== Aftermath ==
After their triumph at the 7th Anniversary Show, Puerto Rican Army cemented its place as the top villainous group in the company. A new championship was introduced to FMW called the FMW Independent Heavyweight Championship, which was originally designed for Atsushi Onita to wear it during his retirement match at the 6th Anniversary Show. Masato Tanaka defeated Mr. Pogo in the quarter-final match of a tournament for the new title on May 27, which led Víctor Quiñones to slap Pogo for losing the match and Pogo took it as an insult and confronted Quinones and then The Headhunters attacked Pogo, thus kicking him out of the group and Pogo turned face. Pogo joined the FMW team to feud with the Puerto Rican Army and lost to his tag team partner Terry Funk at Summer Spectacular. During the match, Pogo suffered an injury which would lead him to a temporary retirement. Funk would become the leader of the Puerto Rican Army and rename it to Funk Masters of Wrestling in September. At Year End Spectacular, Pogo wrestled his retirement match in which Atsushi Onita made his comeback from retirement and the two teamed with Masato Tanaka and Tetsuhiro Kuroda to defeat the Funk Masters of Wrestling.

Hayabusa was embarrassed at letting FMW down and held himself responsible for FMW's loss of the one million yens to the Puerto Rican Army. He hid from FMW. On June 28, Koji Nakagawa, Masato Tanaka and Tetsuhiro Kuroda defeated Super Leather and The Headhunters to win the World Street Fight 6-Man Tag Team Championship. After the match, Nakagawa spotted Hayabusa watching the match backstage and attacked him for leaving FMW when the company needed him most and it would lead to a match between the two at Summer Spectacular, which Hayabusa won. However, the match was considered disappointing and they had a rematch which Nakagawa won to settle the score. On September 15, Hayabusa regained the yens for FMW, which they lost at 7th Anniversary Show, by defeating Funk Masters of Wrestling in a two million yens on a pole match.

After losing the Women's Championship to Megumi Kudo in her retirement match at 7th Anniversary Show, Combat Toyoda had her retirement ceremony on June 28. A year later, Kudo announced her own retirement as she would wrestle in the main event of the following year's 8th Anniversary Show, where she defeated Shark Tsuchiya in a No Rope 200 Volt Double Hell Double Barbed Wire Barricade Double Landmine Crushed Glass Electrical Barbed Wire Deathmatch to win the Women's Championship and then retired immediately after the match.

== Results ==
No.	Results	Stipulations	Times
1	Jason the Terrible defeated Nanjyo Hayato	Singles match	8:20
2	Chaparita Asari and Yumi Fukawa defeated Kaori Nakayama and Aki Kanbayashi	Tag team match	12:08
3	Kamikaze, Katsutoshi Niiyama and Wild Shooter defeated Daisuke Ikeda, Shoichi Funaki and Tetsuhiro Kuroda	Six-man tag team match	14:39
4	The Rock 'n' Roll Express (Ricky Morton and Robert Gibson) and Ricky Fuji defeated Crypt Keeper, Boogie Man and Freddy Krueger	Six-man tag team match	9:09
5	Ryuma Go and Samurai Max defeated Maijin and Silver X	Tag team match	15:33
6	Taka Michinoku defeated Koji Nakagawa (c)	Singles match for the FMW Independent World Junior Heavyweight Championship	15:49
7	Chigusa Nagayo defeated Shark Tsuchiya via referee stoppage	Street Fight	13:20
8	Hideki Hosaka, Hido and Mitsuhiro Matsunaga defeated Miguel Perez, Shoji Nakamaki and Toryu	Six-man tag team match	13:18
9	Super Leather and The Headhunters (A and B) defeated Hisakatsu Oya, Horace Boulder and The Gladiator	Street Fight for the inaugural FMW World Street Fight 6-Man Tag Team Championship	19:59
10	Cactus Jack (c) defeated W*ING Kanemura	Caribbean Barbed Wire Barricade Spider Net Glass Deathmatch for the IWA King of the Death Match Championship	16:49
11	Megumi Kudo defeated Combat Toyoda (c)	No Ropes Exploding Barbed Wire Deathmatch for the FMW Independent and WWA World Women's Championship	21:26
12	Mr. Pogo and Terry Funk defeated Hayabusa and Masato Tanaka	One Million Yen No Ropes Exploding Barbed Wire Double Hell Exploding Deathmatch	19:01
(c) / – the champion(s) heading into the match
