= Summer Spectacular (1996) =

Professional wrestling event in Japan

Summer Spectacular: Shiodome Legend
- Promotion: Frontier Martial-Arts Wrestling
- Date: August 1, 1996
- City: Tokyo, Japan
- Venue: Shiodome
- Attendance: 3,580

Event chronology
| ← Previous; Yamato Nadeshiko III | Next → Year End Spectacular |

Summer Spectacular / Shiodome Legend chronology
| ← Previous; 1994 | Next → 1997 |

Summer Spectacular (1996) was the fourth Summer Spectacular professional wrestling event produced by Frontier Martial-Arts Wrestling (FMW). The event took place on August 1, 1996 at the Shiodome in Tokyo, Japan.

The main event was a no ropes exploding barbed wire glass crush spider net double hell deathmatch between Mr. Pogo and the Puerto Rican Army leader Terry Funk. Funk won by knockout. The event also featured the tournament final for the newly created Independent Heavyweight Championship between Masato Tanaka and W*ING Kanemura. Kanemura defeated Tanaka to become the first Independent Heavyweight Champion.

== Background ==
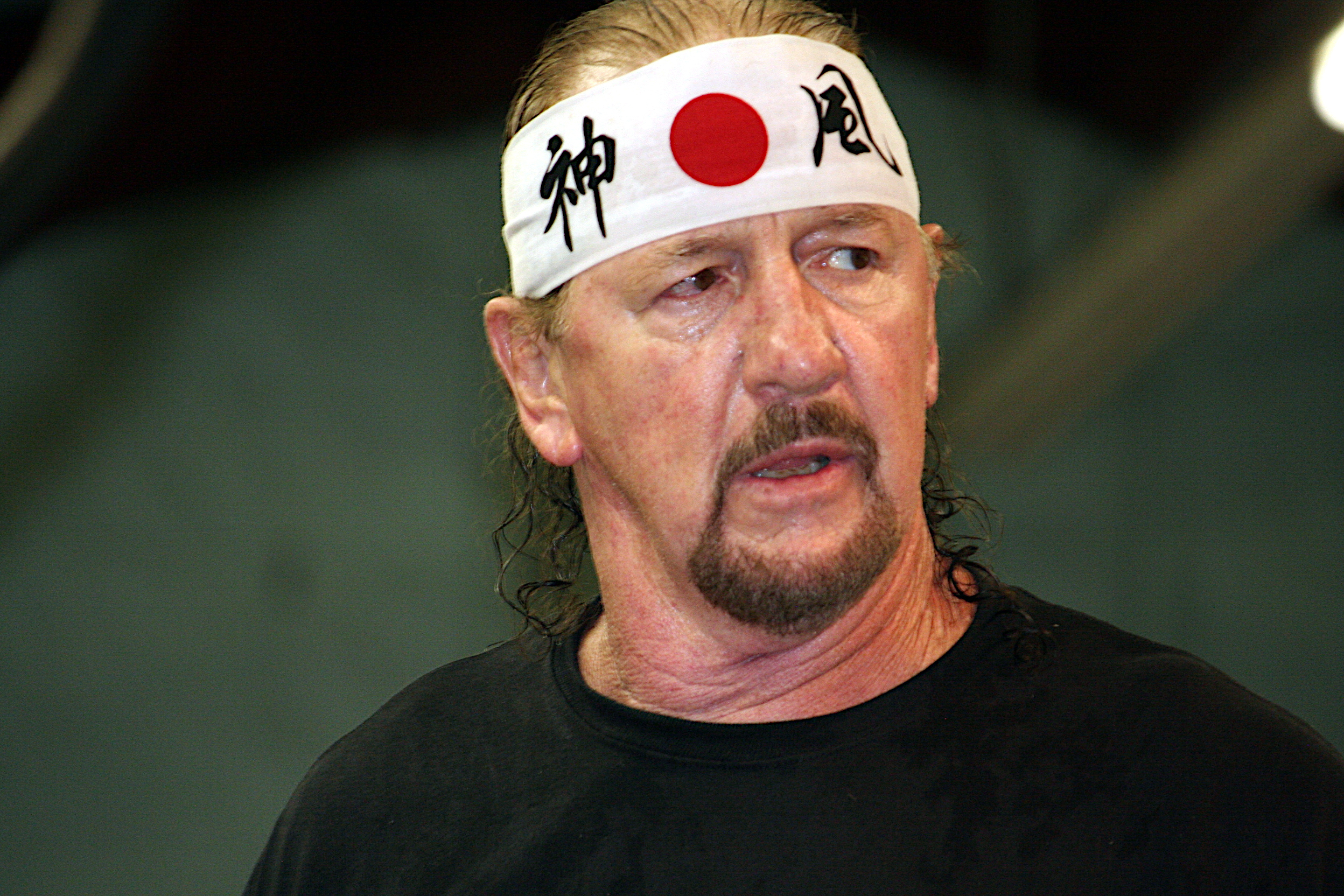
Terry Funk defeated Mr. Pogo in the main event.

At 7th Anniversary Show, Puerto Rican Army members Mr. Pogo and Terry Funk defeated Hayabusa and Masato Tanaka in a one million yen no rope explosive barbed wire time bomb land mine double hell death match to win FMW's one million yens. After the event, Pogo and Tanaka participated in a tournament for the new FMW Independent Heavyweight Championship, in which Tanaka defeated Pogo in the quarter-final on May 27, 1996. After the match, Puerto Rican Army's manager Víctor Quiñones slapped Pogo on the loss and Pogo took it as an insult and grabbed Quiñones and then The Headhunters laid out Pogo. As a result, Pogo turned face and joined the FMW team to feud with the Puerto Rican Army, leading to a match against Terry Funk at Summer Spectacular.

Hayabusa was embarrassed for letting down FMW at 7th Anniversary Show and went into hiding. On June 28, the FMW team of Koji Nakagawa, Masato Tanaka and Tetsuhiro Kuroda defeated Super Leather and The Headhunters to win the FMW World Street Fight 6-Man Tag Team Championship. After the match, Nakagawa spotted Hayabusa backstage watching the match and attacked him for leaving FMW in war against the Puerto Rican Army, until Tanaka and Kuroda held him back. The infuriated Nakagawa challenged Hayabusa to a match at Hayabusa's in-ring return at Summer Spectacular, which Hayabusa accepted.

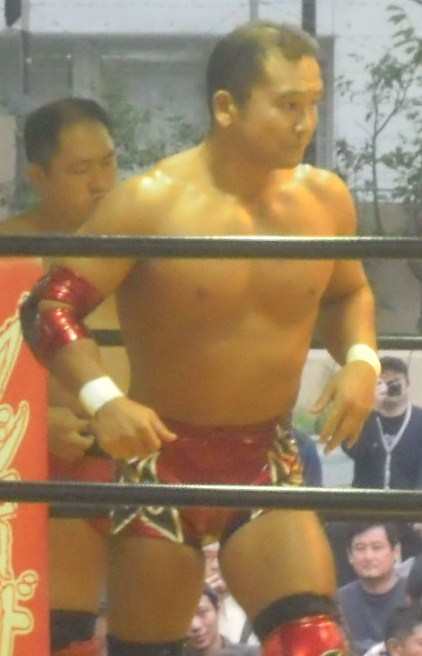
Masato Tanaka was the runner-up of the tournament of the new Independent Heavyweight Championship.

A new FMW Brass Knuckles Heavyweight Championship belt had been planned for Atsushi Onita to defend against Hayabusa in his retirement match at the 6th Anniversary Show in 1995 but the title belt was unavailable at the time and was finally shipped to the company in 1996 and the championship belt was used as a new world heavyweight championship, the FMW Independent Heavyweight Championship. A tournament was announced for the title with Hido, Hisakatsu Oya, Horace Boulder, Koji Nakagawa, Masato Tanaka, Mr. Pogo, Super Leather and W*ING Kanemura named as participants for the eight-man tournament and the final was set to take place at Summer Spectacular. Tanaka and Kanemura advanced to the final of the tournament.

Taka Michinoku defeated Koji Nakagawa to win the FMW Independent World Junior Heavyweight Championship at 7th Anniversary Show. On June 24, Michinoku made his first title defense against Hayato Nanjyo, where he retained the title. After the match, Michinoku offered Nanjyo, a handshake but he refused to shake it and began feuding with Michinoku. On July 21, the team of Tetsuhiro Kuroda, Hayato Nanjyo and Koji Nakagawa defeated Taka Michinoku, Ricky Fuji and Toryu when Nanjyo mocked Michinoku by using Michinoku's Michinoku Driver II on Toryu for the win and then challenged Michinoku to a hair vs. hair match for the title at Summer Spectacular, which Michinoku accepted.

At 7th Anniversary Show, Megumi Kudo defeated Combat Toyoda in a no ropes exploding barbed wire double hell deathmatch to win the FMW Independent and WWA World Women's Championship in Toyoda's retirement match. Toyoda held her retirement ceremony on June 28 and all the female wrestlers of FMW paid their homage to her. Later in the show, Shark Tsuchiya, Miwa Sato and Crusher Maedomari defeated Kudo, Kaori Nakayama and Aki Kambayashi and Kudo began her next feud with the Mad Dog Military, leading to Kudo defending her title against Mad Dog Military at Summer Spectacular.

== Event ==
=== Preliminary matches ===
Makuro Okamuto defeated Hideo Makimura in the opening match of the show by making him submit to a single legged Boston crab.

Kaori Nakayama took on Miwa Sato in a match, which began with both women pulling each other's hair. Near the end of the match, Sato attempted to perform a backdrop suplex on Nakayama but Nakayama countered it into a pinfall attempt and then performed a Moonsault to win the match.

Next was an eleven-man royal rumble match. Ricky Fuji and Hideki Hosaka were the first two participants. After the rest of the wrestlers got eliminated, Hido, The Gladiator and Tetsuhiro Kuroda were the final three participants remaining in the ring. Kuroda dropkicked Gladiator, allowing Hido to eliminate him over the top rope with a lariat. Hido and Kuroda battled each other and brought chairs into the ring. Hido delivered a Piledriver to Kuroda and followed it with a Moonsault to win the match.

Taka Michinoku defended the FMW Independent World Junior Heavyweight Championship against Hayato Nanjyo in a hair vs. hair match. Near the end of the match, both men blocked each other's attempts at the Michinoku Driver II and collapsed down on the mat. Michinoku quickly gained breath and performed a missile dropkick and followed it with a Michinoku Driver II to retain the title. After the match, Nanjyo handed Michinoku scissor to cut his hair to respect the pre-match stipulation and Michinoku showed respect by cutting just a bit of hair.

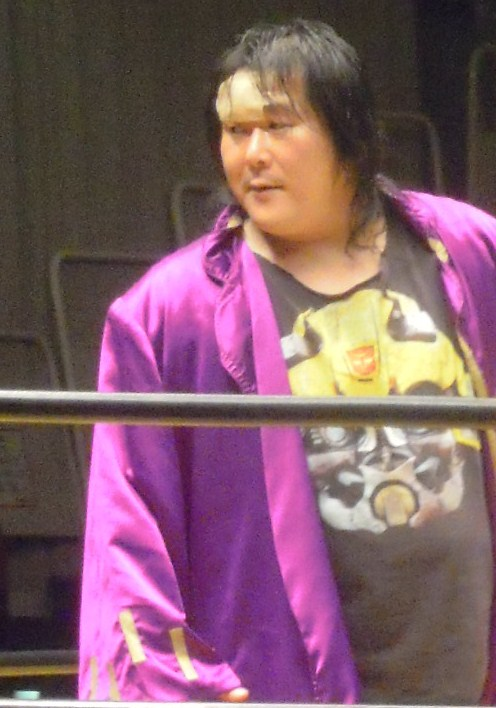
W*ING Kanemura defeated Masato Tanaka in a tournament final to become the inaugural Independent Heavyweight Champion in the semi-main event.

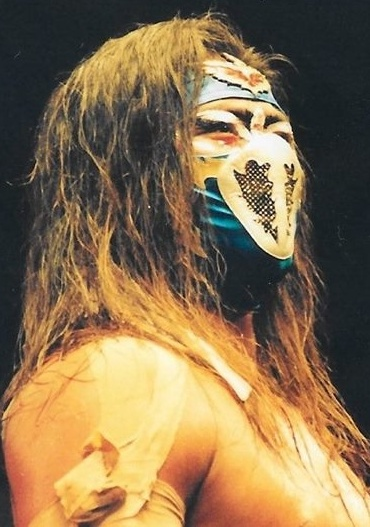
Hayabusa made his in-ring return to Summer Spectacular after his injury by defeating Koji Nakagawa at the event.

Megumi Kudo defended the FMW Independent and WWA World Women's Championship against Mad Dog Military (Shark Tsuchiya, Bad Nurse Nakamura and Crusher Maedomari) in a handicap match. Mad Dog Military overpowered Kudo during the earlier part of the match. At one moment, Tsuchiya accidentally hit Nakamura with a barbed wire baseball bat intended for Kudo. As the match reached its climax, Tsuchiya handed a bat to Nakamura to hit Kudo with it but Nakamura turned on Tsuchiya by hitting her with the bat instead and Kudo grabbed Nakamura and delivered a Kudo Driver and a Thunder Fire Powerbomb to retain the title. After the match, Tsuchiya blew a fireball on Kudo.

Hayabusa took on Koji Nakagawa in his in-ring return after recovering from his injury. Hayabusa executed his Firebird Splash and Falcon Arrow on Nakagawa but Nakagawa managed to survive in the match until Hayabusa performed a face kick which knocked both men down. The referee began to count and Hayabusa got up while Nakagawa failed to answer the referee's ten count and Hayabusa was awarded the win via knockout.

Masato Tanaka and W*ING Kanemura competed in the finals of a tournament for the new FMW Independent Heavyweight Championship. Near the end of the match, Kanemura performed a low blow on Tanaka and ran off the ropes to receive a Rolling Elbow from Tanaka. Kanemura slowed down Tanaka with a lariat and then performed a Thunder Fire Powerbomb to get a near-fall. He attempted it again but Tanaka countered by backdropping him to the mat. Tanaka attempted another Rolling Elbow but Kanemura countered with two German suplexes. Tanaka made a comeback by hitting Kanemura with a Rolling Elbow and got a near-fall and then attempted the move again but Kanemura countered it with his own Rolling Elbow and Tanaka kicked out of the pinfall attempt. Kanemura weakened down Tanaka with two diving leg drops and then performed a Thunder Fire Powerbomb to win the title.

=== Main event match ===
Mr. Pogo took on Terry Funk in a no ropes exploding barbed wire glass crush spider net double hell deathmatch. Both men traded momentum until Víctor Quiñones set a chair on fire and tossed it into the ring and Funk hit Pogo repeatedly with the flaming chair and then blew fire at him, causing Pogo to fall into the spider net, which exploded. Pogo became unconscious and Funk blew a fireball to knock him out for the win.

== Reception ==
Stuart of Puroresu Central gave negative reviews to the event, considering it to be "one of the worst FMW major shows" between 1994 and 1998. He praised the Independent Heavyweight Championship match, the Independent World Junior Heavyweight Championship match and the main event match, with "The show was boring though, because some of the early matches were really dull and just plain bad." According to him, the Tanaka/Kanemura encounter "was a great match of a style that has become more common in FMW as the years have gone by, relying less on garbage props and more on natural ability, blending the two nicely."

== Aftermath ==
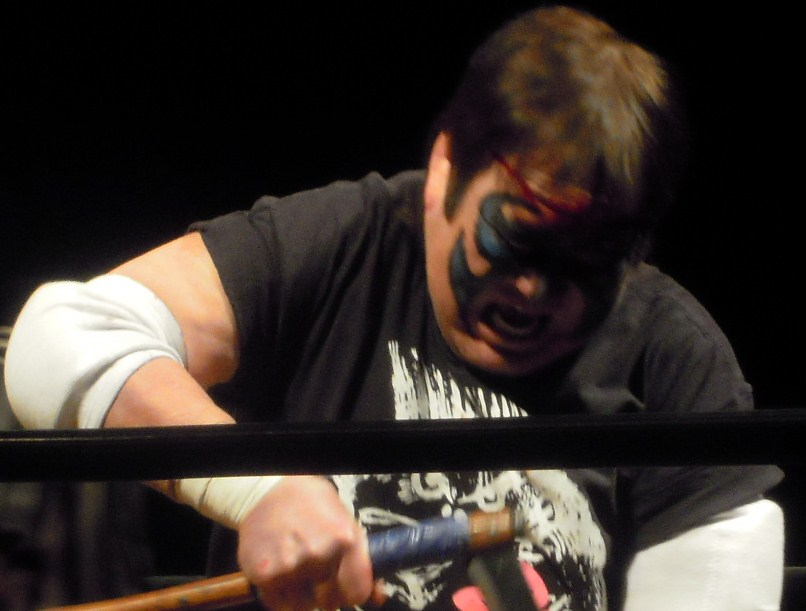
The injuries suffered during his match at Summer Spectacular forced Mr. Pogo to temporarily retire from FMW.

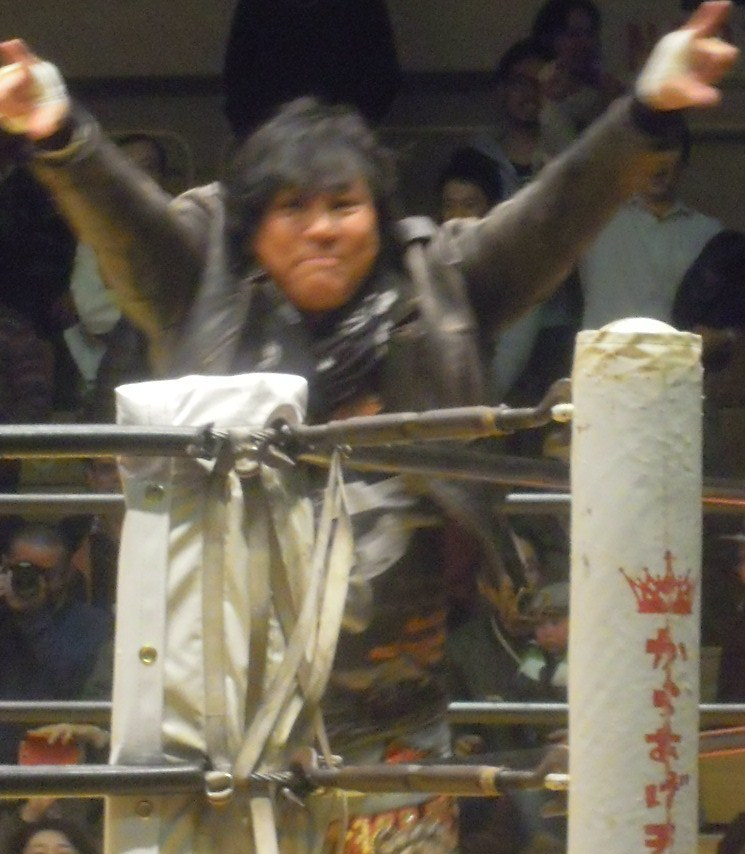
Atsushi Onita came out of retirement to join forces with Mr. Pogo and FMW to compete against Funk Masters of Wrestling at Year End Spectacular.

Mr. Pogo suffered a severe injury that almost ended his career at Summer Spectacular. He continued to feud with Puerto Rican Army, which would become the Funk Masters of Wrestling. Lethal Weapon disbanded on September 15 when Hisakatsu Oya, Horace Boulder and The Gladiator turned on Ricky Fuji and joined Funk Masters of Wrestling. Pogo announced that he would retire at Year End Spectacular. Pogo begged his rival Atsushi Onita to come out of retirement and team with him in his retirement match, with Onita initially declining the offer and then joining Pogo in the war against Funk Masters of Wrestling. At Year End Spectacular, Onita made his in-ring return in Pogo's retirement match with Masato Tanaka and Tetsuhiro Kuroda against the Funk Masters of Wrestling team of Terry Funk, Hisakatsu Oya and The Headhunters, which Onita's team won.

Hayabusa and Koji Nakagawa's match was considered to be a disappointment and the two agreed to have a rematch on August 23, which Nakagawa won and then both men joined forces on the FMW team and put away their differences. Hayabusa regained FMW's yens from the Puerto Rican Army, which they had lost at the 7th Anniversary Show as the FMW team of Hayabusa, Koji Nakagawa, Masato Tanaka and Tetsuhiro Kuroda defeated the Puerto Rican Army team of Hisakatsu Oya, Super Leather and The Headhunters in a two million yen on a pole match on September 15. Hayabusa would begin a losing streak in singles matches, which would end with his win over The Great Sasuke at Year End Spectacular.

After retaining her title at Summer Spectacular, Megumi Kudo announced that she would retire from professional wrestling at 8th Anniversary Show. In her retirement match, Kudo defeated Shark Tsuchiya in the main event of the show, a no rope 200 volt double hell double barbed wire barricade double landmine crushed glass electrical barbed wire deathmatch.

== Results ==
| No. | Results | Stipulations | Times |
|---|---|---|---|
| 1 | Mamoru Okamoto defeated Hideo Makimura via submission | Singles match | 8:40 |
| 2 | Kaori Nakayama defeated Miwa Sato | Singles match | 9:56 |
| 3 | Hido won by last eliminating Tetsuhiro Kuroda (Note: Other participants listed in order of elimination: Gosaku Goshogawara, Toryu, Hideki Hosaka, Ricky Fuji, Halcon Negro, Katsutoshi Niiyama, Super Leather, Hisakatsu Oya and The Gladiator.) | 11-man Royal Rumble | 26:38 |
| 4 | Taka Michinoku (c) defeated Hayato Nanjyo | Hair vs. hair match for the FMW Independent World Junior Heavyweight Championship | 15:47 |
| 5 | Megumi Kudo (c) defeated Mad Dog Military (Shark Tsuchiya, Bad Nurse Nakamura and Crusher Maedomari) | Handicap match for the FMW Independent and WWA World Women's Championship | 17:06 |
| 6 | Hayabusa defeated Koji Nakagawa via knockout | Singles match | 21:55 |
| 7 | W*ING Kanemura defeated Masato Tanaka | Tournament final for the inaugural FMW Independent Heavyweight Championship | 14:51 |
| 8 | Terry Funk (with Víctor Quiñones) defeated Mr. Pogo via knockout | No Ropes Exploding Barbed Wire Glass Crush Spider Net Double Hell Deathmatch | 11:42 |
(c) / – the champion(s) heading into the match

=== Tournament brackets ===
Quarter-Final
Masato Tanaka | Pin
Mr. Pogo | 20:42
Super Leather | Pin
Hido | 19:18
Hisakatsu Oya | Referee Stoppage
Horace Boulder | 13:21
W*ING Kanemura | Pin
Koji Nakagawa | 15:51

Semi-Final
Masato Tanaka | Pin
Hisakatsu Oya | 20:31
W*ING Kanemura | Pin
Super Leather | 15:59

Final
W*ING Kanemura | Pin
Masato Tanaka | 14:51
