= Fall Spectacular (1997) =

1997 professional wrestling event

Fall Spectacular: Kawasaki Legend
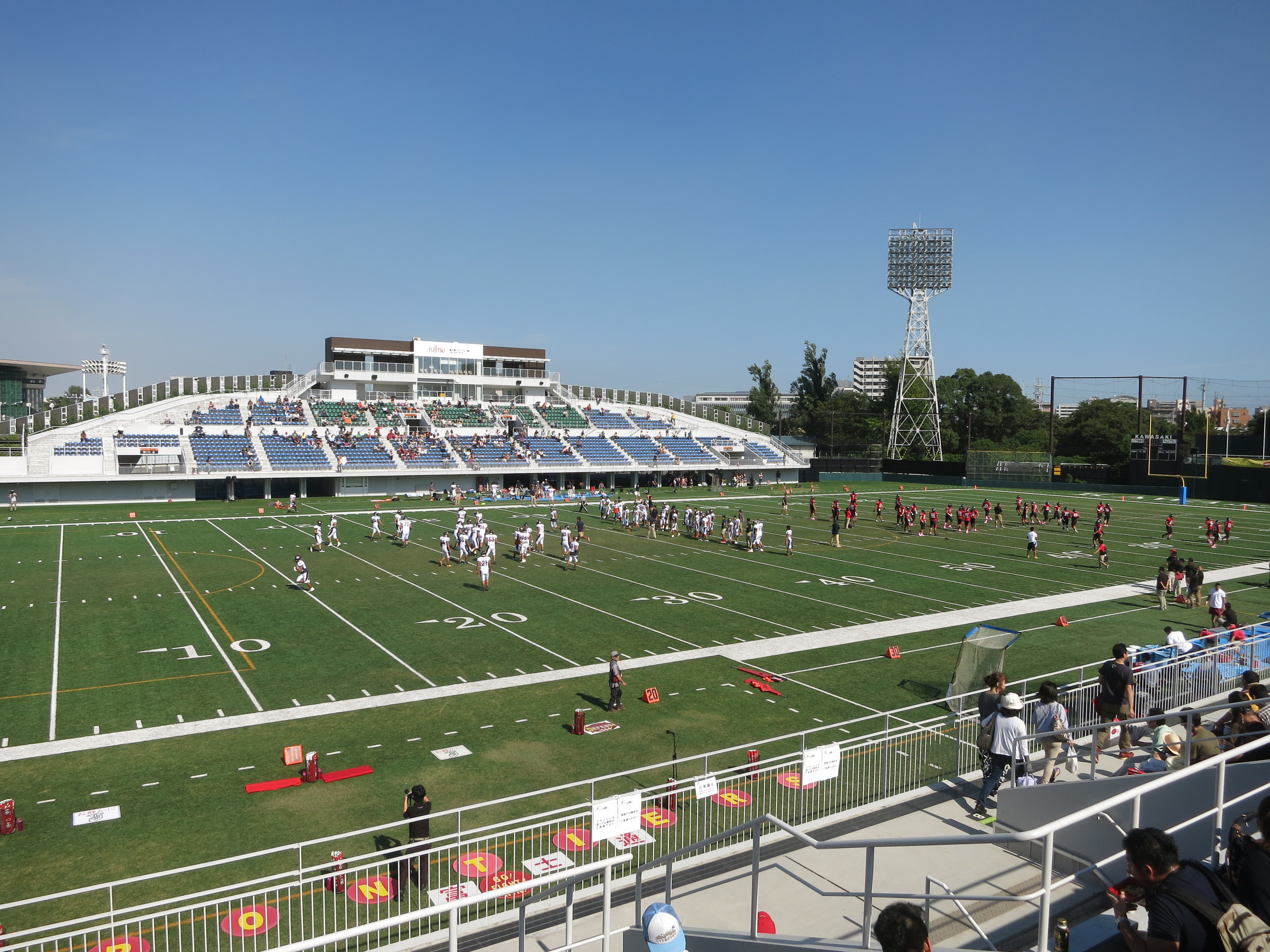
- Promotion: Frontier Martial-Arts Wrestling
- Date: September 28, 1997
- City: Kawasaki, Kanagawa, Japan
- Venue: Kawasaki Stadium
- Attendance: 50,012

Event chronology
| ← Previous; Shiodome Legend | Next → Atsushi Onita Presents Liar, Liar |

Fall Spectacular chronology
| ← Previous; 3rd Anniversary | Next → Last |

Fall Spectacular: Kawasaki Legend was a Fall Spectacular professional wrestling event produced by Frontier Martial-Arts Wrestling (FMW). The event took place on September 28, 1997 at the Kawasaki Stadium in Kawasaki, Kanagawa, Japan. The show aired via tape delay on Samurai TV! on October 12.

The main event was a No Ropes Exploding Barbed Wire Steel Cage Time Bomb Death Match between Atsushi Onita and W*ING Kanemura, which stipulated that if Onita lost, he must retire from professional wrestling and if Kanemura lost, then W*ING Alliance would have to disband. Onita won, forcing W*ING to disband. After the event, Onita formed a bonding with W*ING members and quit FMW team in sympathy and formed ZEN with W*ING members to feud with FMW.

In other major matches on the event, Masato Tanaka defeated The Gladiator to win the FMW Brass Knuckles Heavyweight Championship and the FMW Independent Heavyweight Championship, the All Japan team of Kenta Kobashi and Maunakea Mossman defeated Hayabusa and Jinsei Shinzaki, Funk Masters of Wrestling leader Terry Funk defeated Fuyuki-Gun leader Kodo Fuyuki in a loser leaves FMW match to retain the NWA Texas Heavyweight Championship, Vader defeated Ken Shamrock in an ultimate rules steel cage match and Shark Tsuchiya defeated Aja Kong to win the FMW Independent and WWA World Women's Championship.

== Event ==
=== Preliminary matches ===
The opening match was a twelve-man Royal Rumble match. The final two participants were Ricky Fuji and Tetsuhiro Kuroda. Kuroda lastly eliminated Fuji with a one shoulder powerbomb to win the match.

Next, Kaori Nakayama and Miwa Sato took on Mad Dog Military members Crusher Maedomari and Miss Mongol. Maedomari executed a Nodowa Otoshi on Sato for the win.

Next, Hisakatsu Oya and Mr. Gannosuke defended the Brass Knuckles Tag Team Championship against Jado and Gedo. Gannosuke executed a Thunder Fire Powerbomb on Gedo to retain the titles.

Later, Aja Kong took on Shark Tsuchiya in a match for the vacant FMW Independent and WWA World Women's Championship. Tsuchiya attacked Kong with a fireball to win the vacant titles.

Next, Terry Funk defended the NWA Texas Heavyweight Championship against Kodo Fuyuki in a Loser Leaves FMW match, with the loser being forced to leave FMW. Funk executed a Moonsault on Fuyuki to retain the title.

Next, Ken Shamrock took on Vader in an Ultimate Rules Steel Cage match. Vader was awarded the match via referee stoppage after Shamrock began bleeding heavily.

Next, The Gladiator defended the unified FMW Double Championship against Masato Tanaka. Tanaka nailed a Rolling Elbow Smash to Gladiator to win the title, ending Gladiator's year-long reign.

In the penultimate match, the team of Hayabusa and Jinsei Shinzaki took on Kenta Kobashi and Maunakea Mossman in an interpromotional tag team match. Kobashi nailed a Burning Lariat to Hayabusa for the win.

=== Main event match ===
The main event was a No Ropes Exploding Barbed Wire Steel Cage Time Bomb Death Match between Atsushi Onita and W*ING Kanemura. The match stipulated that if Onita lost then he would be forced to retire and if Kanemura lost then W*ING Alliance would be forced to disband. After a back and forth match, Onita executed a Thunder Fire Powerbomb on Kanemura for the win, thus saving his career and forcing W*ING Alliance to retire.

== Results ==
| No. | Results | Stipulations | Times |
|---|---|---|---|
| 1 | Tetsuhiro Kuroda won by last eliminating Ricky Fuji | 12-man Royal Rumble match | 28:49 |
| 2 | Crusher Maedomari and Miss Mongol defeated Kaori Nakayama and Miwa Sato | Tag team match | 12:34 |
| 3 | Hisakatsu Oya and Mr. Gannosuke (c) defeated Jado and Gedo | Tag team match for the FMW Brass Knuckles Tag Team Championship | 15:12 |
| 4 | Shark Tsuchiya defeated Aja Kong | Singles match for the vacant FMW Independent and WWA World Women's Championship | 18:25 |
| 5 | Terry Funk (c) defeated Kodo Fuyuki | Loser Leaves FMW match for the NWA Texas Heavyweight Championship | 12:23 |
| 6 | Vader defeated Ken Shamrock via referee stoppage | Ultimate Rules Steel Cage match | 7:17 |
| 7 | Masato Tanaka defeated The Gladiator (c) | Singles match for the FMW Brass Knuckles Heavyweight Championship and the FMW Independent Heavyweight Championship | 15:18 |
| 8 | Kenta Kobashi and Maunakea Mossman defeated Hayabusa and Jinsei Shinzaki | Tag team match | 21:30 |
| 9 | Atsushi Onita defeated W*ING Kanemura | No Ropes Exploding Barbed Wire Steel Cage Time Bomb Death Match | 17:41 |
(c) / – the champion(s) heading into the match
