= FMW Fall Spectacular =

- Promotions: Frontier Martial-Arts Wrestling
- Other names: Anniversary Show (1991–1992); Kawasaki Legend (1997)
- First event: 1991
- Last event: 1997

Fall Spectacular was the name of a major professional wrestling event produced by Frontier Martial-Arts Wrestling (FMW) usually held in the month of September. It was considered to be one of the four major shows of FMW, alongside FMW Anniversary Show, Summer Spectacular and Year End Spectacular. The event was first used as a subtitle for the FMW 2nd Anniversary Show in 1991 and the FMW 3rd Anniversary Show in 1992 as both events took place in the month of September. This title would be re-used with the subtitle "Kawasaki Legend" in 1997 before FMW discontinued the use of these events as it began producing pay-per-view events in 1998.

== Dates, venues and main events ==
Event	Date	City	Venue	Main event	Notes
2nd Anniversary Show: Fall Spectacular (1991)	September 23, 1991	Kawasaki, Kanagawa	Kawasaki Stadium	Atsushi Onita vs. Tarzan Goto in a No Rope Explosive Barbed Wire Deathmatch	
3rd Anniversary Show: Fall Spectacular (1992)	September 19, 1992	Yokohama, Japan	Yokohama Stadium	Tiger Jeet Singh (c) vs. Atsushi Onita in a No Rope Explosive Barbed Wire Deathmatch for WWA World Martial Arts Heavyweight Championship	
Fall Spectacular: Kawasaki Legend (1997)	September 28, 1997	Kawasaki, Kanagawa	Kawasaki Stadium	Atsushi Onita vs. W*ING Kanemura in a No Ropes Exploding Barbed Wire Steel Cage Time Bomb Deathmatch	
(c) – refers to the champion(s) heading into the match
