= FMW Summer Spectacular =

- Promotions: Frontier Martial-Arts Wrestling
- Other names: Summer Spectacular (1990; 1993–1994; 1996); Shiodome Legend (1996–1997)
- First event: 1990
- Last event: 1997

Summer Spectacular was a major annual professional wrestling event produced by Frontier Martial-Arts Wrestling during the month of August. The supercard was first held in 1990 in response to World Wrestling Federation's August event SummerSlam. The event would return and be held for two consecutive years in 1993 and 1994. The 1996 edition was subtitled "Shiodome Legend", which would become the event's name for the 1997 edition. This would be the last edition as FMW began producing pay-per-view events in 1998. The event was considered one of the FMW's four big supercards of the year, along with FMW Anniversary Show, Fall Spectacular and Year End Spectacular.

== Dates, venues and main events ==
Event	Date	City	Venue	Main event	Notes
Summer Spectacular in Shiodome	August 4, 1990	Tokyo, Japan	Shiodome	Atsushi Onita (c) vs. Tarzan Goto in a No Ropes Exploding Barbed Wire Deathmatch for the WWA World Brass Knuckles Heavyweight Championship	
Summer Spectacular (1993)	August 22, 1993	Nishinomiya, Hyōgo, Japan	Hankyu Nishinomiya Stadium	Atsushi Onita vs. Mr. Pogo in a No Ropes Exploding Barbed Wire Deathmatch for the vacant FMW Brass Knuckles Heavyweight Championship	
Summer Spectacular (1994)	August 28, 1994	Osaka, Osaka, Japan	Osaka-jō Hall	Atsushi Onita vs. Mr. Pogo in a No Ropes Exploding Barbed Wire Double Hell Deathmatch	
Summer Spectacular: Shiodome Legend	August 1, 1996	Tokyo, Japan	Shiodome	Mr. Pogo vs. Terry Funk in a No Ropes Barbed Wire Landmine match	
Shiodome Legend (1997)	August 2, 1997	Tokyo, Japan	Shiodome	Masato Tanaka vs. W*ING Kanemura in a No Ropes Exploding Barbed Wire Deathmatch	
(c) – refers to the champion(s) heading into the match
