= Shiodome Legend (1997) =

Professional wrestling event in Japan

- Promotion: Frontier Martial-Arts Wrestling
- Date: August 2, 1997
- City: Tokyo, Japan
- Venue: Shiodome
- Attendance: 3,750

Event chronology
← Previous; Japanese Survival	Next → Kawasaki Legend: Fall Spectacular

Summer Spectacular / Shiodome Legend chronology
← Previous; Summer Spectacular: Shiodome Legend	Next → Last

Shiodome Legend (1997) was the fifth and final Summer Spectacular and second Shiodome Legend professional wrestling television event produced by Frontier Martial-Arts Wrestling (FMW). The event took place on August 2, 1997 at Shiodome in Tokyo, Japan and aired on Samurai TV!.

The main event was a no ropes exploding barbed wire deathmatch between Masato Tanaka and W*ING Kanemura for the right to face Atsushi Onita in the main event of Kawasaki Legend: Fall Spectacular. Kanemura won the match and earned a match against Onita at Fall Spectacular, which stipulated that if Kanemura lost, W*ING Alliance would disband.

== Results ==
No.	Results	Stipulations	Times
1	Koji Nakagawa defeated Mr. Pogo #2	Singles match	9:09
2	Ricky Fuji (c) defeated Hayato Nanjyo	Singles match for the Rocky Mountain Middleweight Championship	16:43
3	Tetsuhiro Kuroda defeated Hideki Hosaka	Singles match	11:41
4	Eagle Sawai, Lioness Asuka and Shark Tsuchiya defeated Crusher Maedomari, Miss Mongol and Sayuri Okino	Six-woman tag team match	17:55
5	Super Leather and The Gladiator defeated The Headhunters (A and B)	Tag team match	17:06
6	Kodo Fuyuki defeated Hido	Singles match	13:07
7	Hayabusa and Jinsei Shinzaki defeated Hisakatsu Oya and Mr. Gannosuke	Tag team match	20:43
8	W*ING Kanemura defeated Masato Tanaka	No Ropes Exploding Barbed Wire Deathmatch for the right to face Atsushi Onita at Fall Spectacular	13:05
(c) / – the champion(s) heading into the match
