= Dr. Hannibal =

Canadian professional wrestler (1963–2020)

Personal information
- Born: Steven Gillespie; July 22, 1963 Calgary, Alberta, Canada
- Died: January 18, 2020 (aged 56) Calgary, Alberta, Canada
- Cause of death: Heart attack

Professional wrestling career
- Ring name(s): Dr. Hannibal; Steve Gillespie
- Billed height: 5 ft 9 in (175 cm)
- Billed weight: 205 lb (93 kg)
- Trained by: Les Thornton
- Debut: 1987
- Retired: 2013

Steven Gillespie (July 22, 1963 – January 18, 2020) was a Canadian professional wrestler. He is best known for his appearances in Japan with Frontier Martial-Arts Wrestling in the early-1990s under the ring name Dr. Hannibal.

== Professional wrestling career ==
=== Early career (1987–1992) ===
Born and raised in Calgary, Steve Gillespie trained under former NWA World Junior Heavyweight Champion Les Thornton. He made his debut for the Edmonton, Alberta-based North American Wrestling Association (NAWA) in 1987. He would spend the next two years cutting his teeth in Western Canada's independent circuit, which also included the Winnipeg, Manitoba-based West Four Wrestling Alliance (WFWA). In August 1989, he joined Stampede Wrestling in Calgary, but the promotion closed down four months later. After Stampede's closure, he joined the Canadian National Wrestling Alliance (CNWA) in 1990. After the CNWA closed down in 1991, he returned to the Canadian indies.

In October 1992, Gillespie joined Calgary's new promotion, Canadian Rocky Mountain Wrestling (CRMW).

=== World Wrestling Federation (1992, 1997) ===
Throughout 1992, Gillespie appeared with the World Wrestling Federation as a jobber. In September 1992, Gillespie took part in two TV tapings for the World Wrestling Federation (WWF) in Manitoba. On September 21, he lost to Shawn Michaels at a WWF Superstars TV taping in Winnipeg; the match aired on October 17. The next night on September 22, he lost to Razor Ramon at a WWF Wrestling Challenge TV taping in Brandon; the match aired on October 25. In October 1992, he took part in two TV tapings in Saskatchewan. On October 12, he lost to Kamala at the WWF Superstars TV taping in Saskatoon; the match aired on November 14. The next night on October 13, he lost to Papa Shango at a WWF Wrestling Challenge TV taping in Regina; the match aired on November 1.

Nearly five years later, in July 1997, he defeated Steve Rivers in a dark match at a WWF Shotgun Saturday Night TV taping in Edmonton.

=== Frontier Martial-Arts Wrestling (1992–1994) ===
In November 1992, Gillepsie was invited to join Frontier Martial-Arts Wrestling in Japan, where he adopted the name "Dr. Hannibal", after the fictional Hannibal Lecter from a series of suspense novels. In FMW, he teamed up with fellow Canadian Dr. Luther. In January 1993, he and Luther formed Team Canada with The Gladiator, Big Titan and Ricky Fuji, feuding with the likes of Atsushi Onita, Tarzan Goto and Mr. Gannosuke, among others. He would remain in FMW until September 1994.

=== Late career (1994–2013) ===
On April 8, 1994, Gillepsie won his first championship, the CRMW Mid-Heavyweight Championship, by defeating Steve Rivers. He would hold onto the title for two weeks, before losing it to Sonny Corleone on April 22. A month later on May 22, he rebounded by winning the CRMW Tag Team Championship with Katana, defeating Jason the Terrible and Brad Young to win the vacant titles. He and Katana would hold onto the titles for nearly four months, before losing them to his old rival Corleone and his partner, Rob Austin, on September 10. On November 18, he won his second CRMW Tag team title with Steve Wilde. However, on January 20, 1995, the SS Squad split up, causing the Tag Team titles to be held up in a match between the two. A week later on January 27, Gillespie defeated Wilde by disqualification, making him a three-time Tag Team champion and selecting Eric Freeze as his new partner. Unfortunately, his reign would last two weeks, as he and Freeze lost the titles to Wilde and his partner, Black Bart Steiger. Two weeks later on February 24, he rebounded by defeating Steve Rivers to win the Mid-Heavyweight title for the second time. His reign would last two months, before an injury forced him to vacate the title in April 1995.

After CRMW closed down in 1995, Gillespie was back in the Canadian indies. In the summer of 1996, he joined Bruce Hart in an attempt to revive Stampede Wrestling, but it didn't last very long. In 1997, he, along with Steve Wilde and Otto Gentile, formed Can-Am Wrestling Federation (CAWF). It was in CAWF, where he would alternate between his real name and his Dr. Hannibal gimmick. On February 17, 1998, he won the CAWF Can-Am Mid-Heavyweight Championship, defeating Steve Rivers. In May 1998, he reunited with Wilde as the SS Squad again and won the CAWF Can-Am Tag Team Championship on July 31, defeating Eric Freeze and The Pitbull Kid to win the vacant titles. In August, they lost the titles to Teddy Hart and Mike McFly, but regained the titles back a month later. Not long after regaining the titles, SS Squad would split up again, forcing the tag team titles in limbo. On September 25, Gillespie lost control of the Tag Team titles to Wilde. In 1999, Gillespie sold his stake of the promotion to Wilde and Gentile, before leaving the promotion in June 2000 and retiring.

Gillespie returned to Japan in 1999, wrestling a match for Onita Pro.

In 2012, 12 years after retiring, Gillespie made his return to the ring for Real Canadian Wrestling. His last match was held on March 22, 2013, losing a three-way dance to Jason the Terrible, which also included his former partner Katana.

=== Retirement ===
After retiring from the ring in 2013, Gillespie stayed involved in professional wrestling behind the scenes. He was promoting Hart Legacy Wrestling alongside Teddy Hart and was a trainer for Pro Fitness Group Wrestling Academy in Calgary.

== Death ==
Gillespie was found deceased in his truck in Calgary on January 18, 2020, having suffered an apparent heart-attack; he was 56 years old.

== Championships and accomplishments ==
- Canadian Rocky Mountain Wrestling
  - CRMW Mid-Heavyweight Championship (2 times)
  - CRMW Tag Team Championship (3 times) – with Katana (1 time), Steve Wilde (1 time), and Eric Freeze (1 time)
- Can-Am Wrestling Federation
  - CAWF Can-Am Mid-Heavyweight Championship (1 time)
  - CAWF Can-Am Tag Team Championship (2 times) – with Steve Wilde
