= FMW Year End Sensation =

- Promotions: Frontier Martial-Arts Wrestling
- Other names: Year End Spectacular (1993; 1995–1996)
- First event: 1993
- Last event: 2000

Year End Sensation was a series of touring events produced by Frontier Martial-Arts Wrestling (FMW) taking place annually in the month of December. The intent of the series was to conclude the storylines by the end of the year and head into the new year. The event started in 1993 as a supercard titled Year End Spectacular and then the event was incorporated into a tour after FMW began producing wrestling series in 1995. The event was renamed Year End Sensation and continued as a tour until 2000. The last event promoted as Year End Spectacular took place in 1996. It was considered one of the FMW's four big supercards of the year, along with FMW Anniversary Show, Summer Spectacular and Fall Spectacular before FMW began producing pay-per-view events in 1998.

== Dates and venues ==
Event	Date	City	Venue	Main event	Notes
Year End Spectacular (1993)	December 8, 1993	Tokyo, Japan	Tokyo International Trade Harumi Dome	Atsushi Onita (c) vs. Mitsuhiro Matsunaga in a No Ropes Exploding Barbed Wire Deathmatch for the FMW Brass Knuckles Heavyweight Championship	
Year End Spectacular (1995)	Taped: December 21, 1995; Aired: January 26, 1996	Yokohama, Japan	Bunka Gym	Hayabusa, The Great Sasuke and Koji Nakagawa vs. Super Delfin, Ricky Fuji and TAKA Michinoku	
Year End Sensation (1996)	November 26–December 11, 1996	A tour of eleven shows throughout the country concluding with Year End Spectacular on December 11			
Year End Spectacular (1996)	December 11, 1996	Tokyo, Japan	Komazawa Gymnasium	Atsushi Onita, Mr. Pogo, Masato Tanaka and Tetsuhiro Kuroda vs. Funk Masters of Wrestling (Terry Funk, Hisakatsu Oya and The Headhunters in a Texas Street Fight Tornado Deathmatch	
Year End Sensation (1997)	December 5–December 13, 1997	A tour of five shows throughout the country			
Year End Sensation (1998)	December 5–December 13, 1998	A tour of five shows throughout the country showcasing the Over the Top Tournament and featuring ECW/FMW Supershows.			
Year End Sensation (2000)	December 2–December 20, 2000	A tour of six shows throughout the country including two pay-per-view events.			
(c) – refers to the champion(s) heading into the match
