= Kintaro Kanemura =

Japanese Korean wrestler (born 1970)

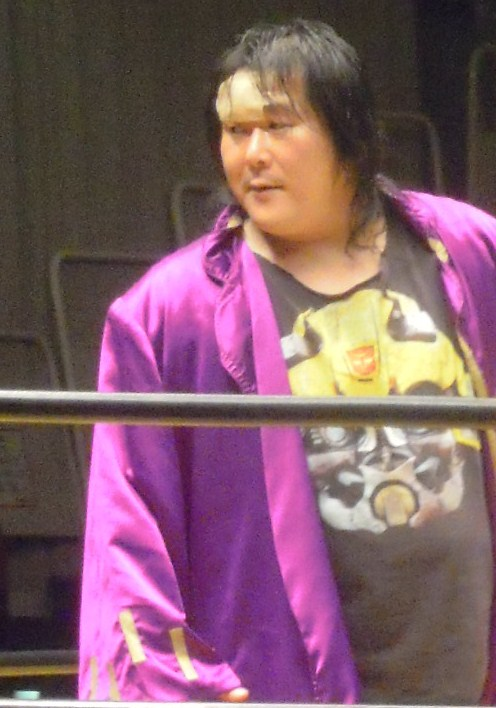
- Kanemura in February 2013

Personal information
- Born: Yukihiro Kanemura; August 9, 1970 (age 55) Tsu, Mie, Japan

Professional wrestling career
- Ring name(s): Kintaman; Kintaro Kanemura; W*ING Kanemura; Wing Kanemura; Yukihiro Kanemura
- Billed height: 1.78 m (5 ft 10 in)
- Billed weight: 112 kg (247 lb; 17.6 st)
- Debut: December 20, 1990
- Retired: December 27, 2016

Yukihiro Kanemura (金村 珩皓, Kanemura Yukihiro; born August 9, 1970), better known by his ring name Kintaro Kanemura (金村 キンタロー, Kanemura Kintarō), is a Zainichi Korean retired professional wrestler. He also wrestled under the ring name Wing Kanemura (ウイング金村, Uingu Kanemura) (stylized as W*ING Kanemura). He is best known for his death matches in Apache Army, Big Japan Pro Wrestling (BJW), Extreme Championship Wrestling (ECW), Frontier Martial-Arts Wrestling (FMW), International Wrestling Association (IWA) and Wrestling International New Generations (W*ING).

After beginning his career in the Japanese independent circuit in 1990, Kanemura joined W*ING in 1991 where he got his first mainstream exposure in professional wrestling and became skilled in deathmatch wrestling style as he participated in many notable deathmatches in the promotion, becoming one of the top stars of W*ING and became a one-time Caribbean Heavyweight Champion, one-time Pacific Northwest Heavyweight Champion and one-time World Tag Team Champion. He then worked briefly for IWA Japan after W*ING folded in 1994 before ultimately joining FMW. He made a name for himself in FMW by rising from a mid-carder to one of FMW's top main eventers as a member of W*ING Alliance and Team No Respect. He was the first title holder of the Independent Heavyweight Championship and the Hardcore Championship. He became a three-time world champion in FMW, winning the Brass Knuckles Heavyweight Championship once, the Independent Heavyweight Championship once and the WEW World Heavyweight Championship once. After FMW folded down, Kanemura became a freelancer in the independent circuit and founded his own promotion, Apache Army, an offshoot of FMW, which ended with Kanemura's retirement in 2016. Other major titles won by Kanemura were the BJW Deathmatch Heavyweight Championship and the KO-D Openweight Championship.

Kanemura is of Korean descent. His Korean name is Kim Hyeong-ho (Korean: 김행호), but he has used a Japanese name in and outside of the ring. However, his best known pseudonym reflected his background, as the forename was a reference to South Korean professional wrestler Kintarō Ōki. He also had a short-lived marriage to Shiho Tsubaki of All Japan Women's Pro-Wrestling (AJW), having first met each other when she was touring with W*ING.

== Professional wrestling career ==
=== Pioneer Senshi (1990–1991) ===
Yukihiro Kanemura made his debut in December 1990 for Pioneer Senshi, against Akitoshi Saito, who also debuted. Within months, Pioneer Senshi folded.

=== Wrestling International New Generations (1991–1994) ===
Kanemura made his debut for Wrestling International New Generations (W*ING) on August 7, 1991, as a fan favorite underdog by teaming with Ryo Miyake against The Headhunters in a losing effort. Although he started in the undercard, he worked his way up the ladder in W*ING and quickly became one of the top stars of the company due to his willingness to take damage in deathmatches. On May 5, 1992, he defeated The Grappler in Osaka to lay claim to a version of the Pacific Northwest Heavyweight Championship, whose championship belt was owned by Grappler (that title win, however, is not recognized as part of the official title history for the NWA Pacific Northwest Heavyweight Championship, which was held at that point by C.W. Bergstrom and would be until Pacific Northwest Wrestling folded in July 1992 after Don Owen's retirement; however, W*ING recognized Kanemura as their Pacific Northwest Heavyweight Champion until the promotion's closure). On June 4, Kanemura teamed with Mitsuteru Tukoda against The Headhunters in a steel cage match, which Kanemura lost after suffering an injury which put him out of action for two months.

Kanemura returned to W*ING at One Night One Soul on August 2, where he teamed with Tokuda to defeat Super Invader and The Masked Inferno in a hair vs. mask barbed wire barricade match when Kanemura pinned Masked Inferno, forcing Inferno to take off his mask and begin competing as Rochester Roadblock. As a result, Kanemura began feuding with Roadblock and the two wrestled each other to a double disqualification on August 14. After coming up short in a title shot on September 27, Kanemura finally defeated Miguel Perez Jr. on December 18 to win the Caribbean Heavyweight Championship.

On March 1, 1993, Kanemura wrestled Kevin Sullivan at a television taping for Smoky Mountain Wrestling (SMW) in the United States, which Kanemura won by disqualification after Sullivan bladed Kanemura's arm with a spike; the incident was censored on national television in America. The injury required Kanemura to get fifty-eight stitches. On April 3, he teamed up with Mitsuhiro Matsunaga to win the World Tag Team Championship, defeating Freddy Krueger and Leatherface. However, Matsunaga vacated the title only six days later to wrestle Leatherface. Kanemura continued his feud with Sullivan to avenge the attack in SMW and the two battled each other to no contest at Dog in the Box on May 27. The two had another rematch at Hollywood Nightmare, which again ended in a no contest. Kanemura became W*ING's top fan favorite after Mitsuhiro Matsunaga left the company to join Frontier Martial-Arts Wrestling (FMW).

On September 26, Kanemura lost the Caribbean Heavyweight Championship to Jado. On October 19, Kanemura and Shoji Nakamaki lost to Jado and Gedo in a falls count anywhere match. At Odawara Brazing Night, Kanemura and Nakamaki lost to Jado and Gedo in a No Ropes Barbed Wire Scramble Fire Deathmatch, when Jado executed a Powerbomb on Kanemura into the fire with Hido's help, burning 75 percent of his skin tissue off his back and shoulder. As a result, Jado and Gedo were awarded the win by forfeit and Kanemura was taken to hospital on a stretcher. Kanemura returned to W*ING on November 20 to show his burns to the crowd and Gedo and Hido tried to confront him until he chased them away with his umbrella. He made his in-ring return to W*ING on February 15 by defeating Hido in a Loser Leaves W*ING Street Fight, forcing Hido to leave W*ING. On March 13, Kanemura headlined the show by teaming with Shoji Nakamaki against Kendo Nagasaki and Nobutaka Araya in a Ring Filled with Cream tornado tag team match, which Kanemura's team lost. This would turn out to be W*ING's last show as the promotion closed due to financial loss on March 21.

=== International Wrestling Association of Japan (1994) ===
After W*ING folded, Kanemura joined the upstart International Wrestling Association of Japan (IWA), defeating The Winger in IWA Japan's debut show on May 21, 1994. While there, he feuded with Shoji Nakamaki in a series of chain matches, until a dispute with bookers caused Kanemura to quit on August 31, 1994.

=== Frontier Martial-Arts Wrestling ===
==== W*ING Alliance (1994–1997) ====
Kanemura signed with FMW for a deal of a monthly salary of $10,000. He debuted in FMW on September 7, 1994, as a villain by attacking Atsushi Onita and joining Mr. Pogo's group. Mitsuhiro Matsunaga would join Kanemura after a falling out with Onita, which was the genesis of the W*ING Alliance. The aim of the group was to end FMW as they held Onita and FMW responsible for ending W*ING. On September 25, Kanemura made his in-ring debut for FMW by teaming with Matsunaga against Hisakatsu Oya and Tarzan Goto in an exploding barbed wire dynamite pool elimination match, which ended in a no contest after Oya turned on Goto to join W*ING Alliance. W*ING and FMW battled each other in many matches between late 1994 and early 1995 and W*ING established itself as the top villainous group. On March 7, 1995, Kanemura won his first title in FMW as he and Mr. Pogo defeated Atsushi Onita and Mr. Gannosuke to win the Brass Knuckles Tag Team Championship. They lost the title to Hisakatsu Oya and Ricky Fuji at the 6th Anniversary Show after a miscommunication took place between Kanemura and Pogo. This led Pogo to blow fire on Kanemura after the match to turn on W*ING and join Lethal Weapon.

On May 17, Kanemura changed his ring name to W*ING Kanemura as a homage to W*ING during his first match against Masato Tanaka, which Kanemura won. The following month, Kanemura took on Mr. Pogo in a Street Fight on June 25 to avenge the betrayal at 6th Anniversary Show, which he lost. In July, Kanemura participated in the Young Spirit Tournament, a tournament featuring the new generation of young wrestlers of FMW after the departure of Atsushi Onita. He made to the finals of the tournament, where he lost to Masato Tanaka on July 30, but reaching in the finals earned both men place in the Grand Slam Tournament for the vacant Brass Knuckles Heavyweight Championship. Kanemura was eliminated from the tournament and scored only two points as his only win in the tournament came against Masato Tanaka on September 5. W*ING briefly turned fan favorites by siding with FMW after Mitsuhiro Matsunaga showed respect to Hayabusa after Hayabusa defeated Matsunaga in a match. On October 28, Kanemura and Tanaka lost to Hayabusa and Matsunaga in a match and all four men formed an alliance to fight Lethal Weapon. Super Leather and Hido took exception to it and joined Lethal Weapon. However, it turned out to be a swerve as Matsunaga turned on Hayabusa during a match against Mr. Pogo and Super Leather of Lethal Weapon and then Super Leather and Hido turned on Lethal Weapon and W*ING Alliance reunited as a group and became a serious threat to FMW and Lethal Weapon.

At Year End Spectacular, the W*ING Alliance squared off against each other as the team of Super Leather, W*ING Kanemura and Hido lost to Mitsuhiro Matsunaga, Jason the Terrible and Hideki Hosaka in a W*ING Caribbean Barbed Wire Double Hell Glass Deathmatch. On February 23, W*ING alliance lost to the FMW team of Koji Nakagawa, Masato Tanaka and Tetsuhiro Kuroda in the first-ever WarGames match in FMW, which ended FMW's feud with W*ING as Víctor Quiñones returned to FMW and introduced Puerto Rican Army to attack FMW and W*ING. As a result, W*ING reverted to fan favorites. At 7th Anniversary Show, Kanemura replaced Mitsuhiro Matsunaga and challenged Cactus Jack for the IWA King of the Deathmatch Championship in a Caribbean Barbed Wire Barricade Spider Net Glass Deathmatch, which Kanemura ended up losing. The match raised Kanemura's stock and enabled him to shine as W*ING's standout performer as Mitsuhiro Matsunaga would leave FMW after the event and Kanemura became the main focus of the group and began rising in popularity in FMW.

Kanemura participated in a tournament for the new Independent Heavyweight Championship, defeating Koji Nakagawa in the quarter-final and Super Leather in the semi-final, a Caribbean Barbed Wire Deathmatch to advance to the final round to determine the first champion at Summer Spectacular, where he defeated Masato Tanaka to win the tournament and become the inaugural Independent Heavyweight Champion. On September 1, the FMW team of Koji Nakagawa, Masato Tanaka and Tetsuhiro Kuroda took on Kanemura, Hido and Hideki Hosaka in a no rope barbed wire double hell deathmatch, during which Kanemura injured his ear after Nakagawa threw him into the exploding barbed wire. Kanemura returned to FMW on October 12 by teaming with Jason the Terrible to defeat Hisakatsu Oya and The Gladiator. After the match, Kanemura was attacked by Gladiator, setting up a title unification match between the two at Year End Spectacular, where Gladiator's Brass Knuckles Heavyweight Championship would also be on the line. After successfully defending the Independent Heavyweight Championship against Hisakatsu Oya in his first title defense on October 26, Kanemura lost the title to Gladiator in the title unification match at Year End Spectacular. This led to the unification of the Independent Heavyweight Championship and the Brass Knuckles Heavyweight Championship which would be collectively defended as the FMW Double Championship.

In 1997, W*ING Alliance joined forces with the returning Atsushi Onita to feud with Funk Masters of Wrestling. On April 25, Kanemura and Hido defeated The Headhunters to end their year-long reign to win the Brass Knuckles Tag Team Championship. At 8th Anniversary Show, the team of Onita, Masato Tanaka and W*ING Kanemura defeated the team of Cactus Jack, The Gladiator and Terry Funk in a Texas Tornado Street Fight Deathmatch when Kanemura pinned Gladiator. On May 25, Kanemura earned the right to face Onita in the main event of Fall Spectacular, after Onita, Kanemura and Hido defeated Koji Nakagawa, Masato Tanaka and Tetsuhiro Kuroda when Onita pinned Tanaka. However, Tanaka begged Onita and Kanemura to give him one more chance and the request was accepted with Kanemura defeating Tanaka in a No Rope Barbed Wire Deathmatch at Shiodome Legend to earn the right to face Onita in the main event of Fall Spectacular. On August 21, Kanemura and Hido lost the Brass Knuckles Tag Team Championship to Mr. Gannosuke and Hisakatsu Oya. Shortly after the title loss, Kanemura fractured his foot but still competed in his scheduled match against Atsushi Onita in a No Ropes Exploding Barbed Wire Steel Cage Time Bomb Deathmatch at Fall Spectacular, which stipulated that if Onita lost, he would be forced to retire and if Kanemura lost then W*ING Alliance would be forced to disband. Kanemura lost the match due to his fractured foot, resulting in him being forced to disband W*ING Alliance.

==== ZEN and Team No Respect (1997–2000) ====
Atsushi Onita grew upset at Yukihiro Kanemura, Hideki Hosaka and Hido being worried due to the end of W*ING Alliance and no group would accept them in FMW. This led Onita to denounce himself as a FMW wrestler and take the former W*ING Alliance members and FMW's young rising star Tetsuhiro Kuroda under his wing to form a new nWo-themed group named ZEN at a press conference on September 30, 1997. The group emerged as the top villainous faction in FMW. On October 14, Kanemura reverted to using his previous ring name Yukihiro Kanemura as he and Hideki Hosaka defeated Super Leather and The Gladiator. On October 19, Onita and Kanemura defeated Funk Masters of Wrestling's Hisakatsu Oya and Mr. Gannosuke to win the Brass Knuckles Tag Team Championship. The impact of ZEN's dominance led Oya, Gannosuke and The Gladiator to end Funk Masters of Wrestling and jump ship to ZEN. The following month, Onita and Kanemura vacated the tag team titles due to Onita's inactivity. On November 28, Kanemura teamed with Mr. Gannosuke to defeat Hayabusa and Masato Tanaka for the vacant Brass Knuckles Tag Team Championship. Gannosuke and Kanemura had a great chemistry and they became over with the fans due to their villainous antics and surpassed their leader Atsushi Onita to get heat from the audience.

Friction arose between ZEN when Onita booked himself against Masato Tanaka in the main event of the first show of the Super Extreme Wrestling War on December 19, while Gannosuke and Kanemura felt that their defense of the Brass Knuckles Tag Team Championship against Hayabusa and Jinsei Shinzaki deserved to be the main event match. Gannosuke and Kanemura retained the titles against Hayabusa and Shinzaki and confronted Onita on his ego and selfishness. On December 22, Gannosuke, Kanemura and Onita lost to Hayabusa, Jinsei Shinzaki and Masato Tanaka in a Barbed Wire Baseball Bat Ladder WarGames match and Gannosuke and Kanemura turned on Onita by attacking him after the match until Koji Nakagawa made the save for Onita. The duo, along with Hido left ZEN. On January 7, 1998, the trio took on Atsushi Onita, Koji Nakagawa and Tetsuhiro Kuroda in the main event of the first ZEN-promoted show. Kanemura's team lost but attacked their opponents after the match and were joined by Fuyuki-Gun in the assault, leading to the two groups merging to form a new alliance called Team No Respect, with Mr. Gannosuke as the leader.

On January 16, Gannosuke, Kanemura and Jado defeated Hayabusa, Hisakatsu Oya and Masato Tanaka to win the World Street Fight 6-Man Tag Team Championship. They lost the title to Atsushi Onita, Koji Nakagawa and Tetsuhiro Kuroda on February 13. The following month, Kanemura participated in a tournament to determine the #1 contender for Mr. Gannosuke's Double Championship, defeating Koji Nakagawa in the quarter-final before losing to The Gladiator in the semi-final. Kanemura would wrestle the departing Jinsei Shinzaki in Shinzaki's last FMW match at the company's first pay-per-view event 9th Anniversary Show, which Kanemura lost. After the event, Kodo Fuyuki took over as the leader of Team No Respect due to Mr. Gannosuke being injured. On May 5, Fuyuki, Kanemura and Hido defeated Atsushi Onita, Koji Nakagawa and Tetsuhiro Kuroda to win the World Street Fight 6-Man Tag Team Championship after Nakagawa apparently suffered a shoulder injury, forcing ZEN to disband as a result of the pre-match stipulation. Later that month, Fuyuki and Kanemura formed a tag team called The New Footloose, a spin-off of Fuyuki's old tag team with Toshiaki Kawada called Footloose in All Japan Pro Wrestling (AJPW).

On May 27, New Footloose defeated Hayabusa and Masato Tanaka to win the Brass Knuckles Tag Team Championship. In June, TNR vacated the World Street Fight 6-Man Tag Team Championship, only to regain it as Fuyuki, Kanemura and new member Koji Nakagawa defeated Hayabusa, Masato Tanaka and Hisakatsu Oya to win the title. On June 26, Kanemura unsuccessfully challenged Hayabusa for the Double Championship. TNR grew in power and began influencing FMW and feuded with Atsushi Onita's ZEN and Hayabusa's Team Phoenix throughout the year. On October 26, New Footloose lost the Brass Knuckles Tag Team Championship to Hayabusa and Daisuke Ikeda. On November 20, FMW President Shoichi Arai stripped TNR of the World Street Fight 6-Man Tag Team Championship and awarded the titles to the departing Atsushi Onita as a reward for founding FMW and making it a successful promotion. In December, Kanemura participated in an Over the Top Tournament to determine the #1 contender for the Double Championship. He defeated Hideki Hosaka in the opening round before losing to eventual winner Mr. Gannosuke in the quarter-final round.

In early 1999, Kanemura teamed with Hido to participate in a tournament for the vacant Brass Knuckles Tag Team Championship and they were eliminated from the tournament losing all of the matches. On May 18, Kodo Fuyuki separated the Double Championship into Brass Knuckles Heavyweight Championship and the Independent Heavyweight Championship and awarded the Brass Knuckles Heavyweight Championship to Kanemura. Kanemura would then team with Mr. Gannosuke and Jado to participate in a tournament for the newly created WEW 6-Man Tag Team Championship, where they lost to Hayabusa, Masato Tanaka and Tetsuhiro Kuroda in the semi-final on July 31. Kanemura lost the Brass Knuckles Heavyweight Championship to Hayabusa at the Hayabusa Graduation Ceremony pay-per-view on August 23. Two days later, Kanemura unsuccessfully challenged Masato Tanaka for the Independent Heavyweight Championship at Last Match, which would turn out to be the last match of the title as it would be retired after the event.

On September 20, Kanemura changed his ring name to Kintaro Kanemura, a name given to him by Shark Tsuchiya based on Korean wrestler Kintarō Ōki and was awarded the new Hardcore Championship by Kodo Fuyuki. He successfully defended the title against Extreme Championship Wrestling's (ECW) Balls Mahoney at 10th Anniversary Show. Later at the event, Kodo Fuyuki lost a loser leaves FMW match to Masato Tanaka and Mr. Gannosuke left TNR to form a tag team with H, which left Kanemura as the leader of Team No Respect and the group turned fan favorites. On December 11, Kanemura successfully defended the Hardcore Championship against Mahoney's tag team partner Axl Rotten. The following night, TNR defeated ECW's Balls Mahoney, Axl Rotten, Super Crazy and Yoshihiro Tajiri. In 2000, Kanemura began an angle with Big Japan Pro Wrestling's (BJW) Ryuji Yamakawa, resulting in an interpromotional feud between BJW and FMW. On February 23, Kanemura lost the Hardcore Championship to Yamakawa at a BJW event. Kanemura then wrestled for ECW, where he lost to Balls Mahoney at Living Dangerously. At FMW 11th Anniversary Show, Kanemura defeated Ryuji Yamakawa to win his second Hardcore Championship.

==== Championship reigns (2000–2002) ====
On June 16, Kanemura disbanded Team No Respect to join Kodo Fuyuki's Shin Fuyuki-Gun, thus turning into a villain and teamed with Hideki Hosaka and Yoshinori Sasaki to defeat Tetsuhiro Kuroda, Hisakatsu Oya and Flying Kid Ichihara. He would be involved in a comedy feud with Hisakatsu Oya, which culminated in a ladder match between the two on July 23, which Oya won. Kanemura successfully defended the Hardcore Championship against Mike Samples on July 28. He then began a violent feud with Masato Tanaka, which culminated in a match between the two for Kanemura's Hardcore Championship at Deep Throat, which Kanemura won to retain the title. In 2001, Shin Fuyuki-Gun disbanded after Tetsuhiro Kuroda turned on Kodo Fuyuki to form Team Kuroda. After a successful title defense against Azusa Kudo on February 11, Kanemura teamed with Ryuji Yamakawa on February 23 to defeat GOEMON and Onryo to win the Hardcore Tag Team Championship. Kanemura and Yamakawa successfully defended the title against Azusa Kudo and Mammoth Sasaki on March 5.

On March 13, Kanemura lost to Tetsuhiro Kuroda in a #1 contender's match for the WEW World Heavyweight Championship. On March 18, Yamakawa suffered a severe brain injury in a match against The Wifebeater, which put him out of action and Kanemura continued to compete in singles competition. Kanemura dropped the Hardcore Championship to Mammoth Sasaki on April 1. At 12th Anniversary Show, Kanemura defeated Sasaki to regain the title winning it for a third time. Kanemura successfully defended the title against Jun Kasai on May 22 and then retired the title afterwards.

On June 8, Kanemura affiliated with Kodo Fuyuki, who owned 48% of the company's shares and wanted to sale it to Stuart Levy's Tokyopop. Kanemura would then feud with Hayabusa and Shoichi Arai's FMW team. On July 30, Kanemura, Mr. Gannosuke and Kodo Fuyuki defeated the team of Flying Kid Ichihara, Hisakatsu Oya and Ricky Fuji to win the WEW 6-Man Tag Team Championship. On August 3, Kanemura pinned Hayabusa in a six-man tag team match to earn a title shot at Hayabusa's WEW World Heavyweight Championship on August 11, where he defeated Hayabusa to win the title with help from Mammoth Sasaki. Kanemura lost the title back to Hayabusa in a rematch on September 5, but the FMW President Senmu Yoshida overturned the decision on September 9 by showing a video in which Hayabusa used a low blow on Kanemura to win the title and returned the title to Kanemura. Later at the event, the team of Kintaro Kanemura, Kodo Fuyuki and Mr. Gannosuke lost the WEW 6-Man Tag Team Championship to Hayabusa, GOEMON and Tetsuhiro Kuroda.

On November 23, Kanemura successfully defended the WEW World Heavyweight Championship against The Great Sasuke. Later that night, Kanemura turned fan favorite by siding with Mr. Gannosuke, Tetsuhiro Kuroda and Mammoth Sasaki to feud with Kodo Fuyuki, who had turned on FMW to ally with Genichiro Tenryu's WAR alliance. On December 2, Kanemura teamed with the returning Ryuji Yamakawa to defend the WEW Hardcore Tag Team Championship at a BJW event against Daisuke Sekimoto and Men's Teioh in a title vs. title match with Sekimoto and Teioh's BJW Tag Team Championship also being defended. Kanemura and Yamakawa lost the match and the titles. On December 9, FMW's team of Kuroda, Gannosuke, Kanemura and Sasaki defeated WAR's team of Fuyuki, Tenryu, Arashi and Koki Kitahara. On December 23, Kanemura teamed with Sasaki and participated in a tournament for the vacant WEW World Tag Team Championship, defeating Balls Mahoney and Horace Boulder in the quarter-final and Super Crazy and Crazy Boy in the semi-final before losing to Mr. Gannosuke and Tetsuhiro Kuroda in the final. On January 6, 2002, Kanemura lost the WEW World Heavyweight Championship to Kodo Fuyuki. The following month, on February 4, the team of Kanemura, GOEMON and Mammoth Sasaki defeated Vic Grimes, Paul LeDuc and Mitsunobu Kikuzawa. This would turn out to be FMW's last show as the promotion closed on February 15 due to bankruptcy.

=== Freelance (2002–2004) ===
After FMW's demise, Kanemura joined Kodo Fuyuki's World Entertainment Wrestling (WEW), which lasted until 2004. Kanemura's home promotion was WEW but he became a freelancer and wrestled on many independent promotions in Japan. Kanemura had begun wrestling for several promotions in 2000 to make more money while also competing for FMW. Kanemura had begun making appearances for Dramatic Dream Team (DDT) in 2001 and began feuding with DDT's top star Sanshiro Takagi in 2002. On April 18, Kanemura teamed with Super Uchu Power, Chocoball Mukai and Futoshi Miwa to take on Takagi, Takashi Sasaki and Tanomusako Toba in a handicap match with Power's Ironman Heavymetalweight Championship on the line. Takagi won the title and then Kanemura used the title's 24/7 rules and immediately defeated Takagi to win the title. The following week, on April 25, Kanemura teamed with Super Uchu Power to defend the title against Takagi and Takashi Sasaki in a match, during which Takagi pinned Kanemura to win the title. On May 16, Kanemura defeated GENTARO and Takashi Sasaki in a three-way match to become the #1 contender for the KO-D Openweight Championship. At Max Bump, Kanemura defeated champion Sanshiro Takagi to win the KO-D Openweight Championship, also winning Takagi's Ironman Heavymetalweight Championship for the second time in the process. Kanemura lost the Ironman Heavymetalweight Championship six days later to Chocoball Mukai. Kanemura would then team with Futoshi Miwa to participate in the 2002 KO-D Tag League, in which the two managed to score eight points. Kanemura lost the KO-D Openweight Championship back to Sanshiro Takagi on September 7.

Kanemura would frequently make appearances in Pro Wrestling Zero-One as part of a working partnership between WEW and Zero-One, participating in Zero-One's Fire Festival, where he won only one match in his block against Taka Michinoku. Kanemura defeated Tetsuhiro Kuroda to win the reinstated WEW World Heavyweight Championship on a WEW television show which aired on September 3. On March 3, 2003, the team of Kanemura and Kuroda defeated Gentaro and Takashi Sasaki to win the WEW World Tag Team Championship. Later that month, Kanemura defeated Shadow WX in a Lighttubes and Glass Deathmatch to win the vacant BJW Deathmatch Heavyweight Championship on March 30 during the Harder than Hardcore IV tour. He successfully defended the title against Abdullah Kobayashi in a No Ropes Barbed Wire Deathmatch on June 1, before dropping the title to Ryuji Ito in a steel cage match on August 24. Kanemura continued to compete as WEW's top wrestler until the promotion closed in 2003 due to the death of its owner Kodo Fuyuki and the promotion was changed into Fuyuki Army. Kanemura would then also begin making appearances for Hayabusa's Wrestlings Marvelous Future (WMF) promotion, where he debuted at Marvelous Days 3rd event on July 25 as the tag team partner of Mammoth Sasaki and Tetsuhiro Kuroda against Mr. Gannosuke, Mr. Iwaonosuke and Mr. Rocknosuke, which Kanemura's team won.

On August 25, Kanemura defeated Mr. Gannosuke in a match and after the match, Kanemura formed a stable with several former FMW wrestlers called Apache Army. The stable would include Gannosuke, Taka Michinoku, Tetsuhiro Kuroda, GOEMON, GENTARO, Hido, Go Ito and Takashi Sasaki. On October 2, the team of 2 Tuff Tony, Kintaro Kanemura and Mad Man Pondo defeated Gosaku Goshogawara, Taka Michinoku and Tetsuhiro Kuroda to win the WEW 6-Man Tag Team Championship. A week later, Kanemura and Kuroda won the All Asia Tag Team Championship by defeating Hirotaka Yokoi and Kohei Sato. On December 5, Kanemura was scheduled to team with Mr. Gannosuke and Tetsuhiro Kuroda against Shinjiro Otani, Masato Tanaka and Tatsuhito Takaiwa but was pulled out of the show due to a lymph infection and was replaced by Mammoth Sasaki. The injury forced Kanemura to vacate the All Asia Tag Team Championship on December 10.

=== Apache Pro-Wrestling Army (2004–2016) ===
Kanemura returned to the ring in early 2004 and WEW's successor Fuyuki Army ended on May 5. The Apache Army stable competed as freelancers in the Japanese independent circuit. On July 4, Kanemura promoted his own show Kintaro Kanemura Festival, where he and Hido defeated the team of Daisuke Sekimoto and Ryuji Ito in a hardcore rules match. On August 19, Kanemura and Hido defeated Tomohiro Ishii and Kendo Kashin to win the WMG Tag Team Championship at a Riki Pro show. On August 28, Kanemura started a promotion Apache Pro-Wrestling Army, which grew out of their stable. Things were going well for Kanemura until February 2008, when a sexual harassment scandal cost him several bookings from other promotions.

On November 15, 2015, Kanemura announced that he plans on retiring from the ring sometime in the next year. Kanemura's retirement match took place on December 27, 2016, and saw him, Masato Tanaka and Tetsuhiro Kuroda lose to Daisuke Sekimoto, Kohei Sato and Yuji Hino in a six-man tag team match with Sekimoto pinning Kanemura to end his career.

== Championships and accomplishments ==
- Big Japan Pro Wrestling
  - BJW Deathmatch Heavyweight Championship (1 time)
- Dramatic Dream Team
  - Ironman Heavymetalweight Championship (2 times)
  - KO-D Openweight Championship (1 time)
- Fighting World of Japan Pro Wrestling
  - WMG Tag Team Championship (1 time) – with Badboy Hido
- Frontier Martial-Arts Wrestling / World Entertainment Wrestling / Apache Pro-Wrestling Army
  - FMW Brass Knuckles Heavyweight Championship (1 time)
  - FMW Brass Knuckles Tag Team Championship (5 times) – with Mr. Pogo (1), Hido (1), Atsushi Onita (1), Mr. Gannosuke (1), and Kodo Fuyuki (1)
  - FMW Independent Heavyweight Championship (1 time)
  - FMW/WEW Hardcore Championship (3 times)
  - FMW World Street Fight 6-Man Tag Team Championship (4 times) – with Mr. Gannosuke and Jado (1), Kodo Fuyuki and Hido (1), Kodo Fuyuki and Koji Nakagawa (1), and Raijin Yaguchi and Tomohiko Hashimoto (1)
  - WEW 6-Man Tag Team Championship (1 time) – with Kodo Fuyuki and Mr. Gannosuke (1)
  - WEW Hardcore Tag Team Championship (1 time) – with Ryuji Yamakawa
  - WEW Heavyweight Championship (6 times)
  - WEW Tag Team Championship (2 times) – with Tetsuhiro Kuroda
  - FMW Independent Heavyweight Championship Tournament (1996)
- Wrestling International New Generations
  - W*ING Caribbean Heavyweight Championship (1 time)
  - W*ING Pacific Northwest Heavyweight Championship (1 time)^{1}
  - W*ING World Tag Team Championship (1 time) – with Mitsuhiro Matsunaga
- Other
  - Koichiro Kimura Memorial Time Difference Battle Royal (2014)

1 W*ING recognized Kanemura as the W*ING Pacific Northwest Heavyweight Champion until W*ING's closure on March 13, 1994. However, Pacific Northwest Wrestling did not recognize Kanemura's title win.
