= Víctor Quiñones =

Puerto Rican professional wrestling promoter (1959–2006)

- Quiñones in 1997.
- Born: Víctor Quiñones Hernández; June 30, 1959; San Juan, Puerto Rico
- Died: April 2, 2006 (aged 46); Carolina, Puerto Rico
- Occupation: Professional wrestling executive
- Years active: 1984–2006

Víctor Quiñones Hernández (June 30, 1959 – April 2, 2006) was a Puerto Rican professional wrestling promoter, manager, and the founder and owner of International Wrestling Association in Japan, as well as the later International Wrestling Association in Puerto Rico.

== Early life ==
Quiñones' mother was the owner of a hotel in San Juan where wrestlers stayed in Puerto Rico and his stepfather was a lawyer and politician and they raised him to be savvy and entrepreneurial. Being bilingual, he became an asset to the Puerto Rican wrestling office at a young age of 13, helping out Gorilla Monsoon and others when they came to the island. After his mother died, Quiñones moved to the United States in 1979, where he lived with Gorilla Monsoon until 1984. In 1984, Quiñones bought a quarter interest from Gorilla Monsoon in the World Wrestling Council.

== Professional wrestling career ==
=== World Wrestling Council (1984–1996) ===
In 1984, Víctor Quiñones bought a quarter interest in the World Wrestling Council from Gorilla Monsoon. He worked as a booker, agent, and referee.

In July 1988, when Bruiser Brody was stabbed in Puerto Rico, Quiñones had to call a radio station to broadcast that they needed an ambulance urgently and a local ambulance driver heard the call over the radio at a local restaurant and made his way to the scene.

=== Japan (1996–1998) ===
Quiñones was primarily a manager for The Headhunters and Mr. Pogo, but was affiliated with Terry Funk, Mike Awesome, Hisakatsu Oya and Cactus Jack in the stable Funk Masters of Wrestling on Frontier Martial-Arts Wrestling (FMW) from 1996 to 1997. He also became official manager for Taka Michinoku for one time only, when he assisted him to fought his own mentor The Great Sasuke on 4th Anniversary of Michinoku Pro after Taka won WWF Light Heavyweight Championship from Brian Christopher at D-Generation X: In Your House in 1997.

Quiñones was one of the prominent managers of the pioneering hardcore wrestling promotion Frontier Martial-Arts Wrestling, and also was the picador of Shocker & founder and owner of two hardcore wrestling promotions in Japan; Wrestling International New Generations (W*ING) and International Wrestling Association of Japan (IWA Japan).

Quiñones retained strong connections with many professional wrestling federations outside Puerto Rico, and was known for his extraordinary booking/promoting faculty. He was a very rich person and took very good care of wrestlers. Japanese wrestler Taka Michinoku was heavily helped by Quiñones when he had been to outside Japan. Thanks to Quiñones, he could wrestle in ECW, WWF (USA), AAA (Mexico), IWA (Puerto Rico), FMW (Japan), and he has stated that without Quiñones' help, he wouldn't be able to start Kaientai Dojo and that Quiñones was like a father to him. Kintaro Kanemura reminisced about Quiñones as "If I didn't meet him, maybe I would die in the middle of America" (when he first arrived in North America, he had only ¢20). Mitsunobu Kikuzawa described Quiñones as the No.1 promoter in the world. Tajiri has referred to Quiñones as his biggest mentor in wrestling.

=== World Wrestling Federation (1998–1999) ===
Quiñones was hired by the World Wrestling Federation (WWF, now WWE) to be the president of WWF Latino. He produced a WWF Spanish brand named Los Super Astros that aired from 1998 to 1999 in Univision. The show was hosted by Carlos Cabrera and Hugo Savinovich. Backstage interviews were handled by Maria Felipe. The storylines were created within the program only with Mexican luchadores such as El Hijo del Santo and Negro Casas that competed in Asistencia Asesoría y Administración (AAA) and Puerto Rican wrestlers such as Miguel Pérez Jr., Jesús Castillo Jr. and José Estrada Jr.. Also Savio Vega and some other talents went from the main roster to make appearances at Super Astros.

The last Super Astros taping aired on June 6, 1999.

=== IWA Puerto Rico (1999–2006) ===
The International Wrestling Association tried to launch in 1994 with some TV tapings but was unsuccessful. By the end of 1999, Victor Quiñones, alongside Savio Vega and Miguel Pérez, formed the International Wrestling Association in Puerto Rico. Quiñones with his contact with the World Wrestling Federation, became a base for WWF house shows for some time. It featured superstars like The Rock, Kane, Chris Jericho, Edge, Kurt Angle and The Undertaker, among others. The WWF also send developmental talent to IWA Puerto Rico to train and gain experience.

By 2002 the WWF finish the working agreement, IWA had developed a roster of home grown talent like Chicano, Ricky Banderas, El León Apolo with a booking team of Dutch Mantel, Luke Williams and Hector “Moody” Melendez. He promoted IWA Puerto Rico until his death in 2006. The company was keep in business until 2011 with Savio Vega and Miguel Pérez Jr promoting. On October 24, 2018, IWA Puerto Rico was relaunched by Savio Vega. IWA Puerto Rico is regarded as Víctor Quiñones legacy in professional wrestling in Puerto Rico.

== Personal life ==
Quiñones was the son of Robert "Gorilla Monsoon" Marella. However, Marella's family denies that Quiñones was a biological child of Marella.

=== Death ===
On April 2, 2006, Quiñones died in his home in Carolina, Puerto Rico at age 46. The cause of death was a mixture of somas (muscle relaxers) with alcohol which caused a cardiac arrest. Soon after the death, several Japanese federations and wrestlers, including Taka Michinoku and Tajiri, paid tribute to him by having special ceremonies.

== See also ==
- List of family relations in professional wrestling
- List of professional wrestling promoters
