= Bad Nurse Nakamura =

Japanese professional wrestler

Personal information
- Born: Rie Nakamura; February 1, 1974 (age 52) Osaka, Osaka, Japan

Professional wrestling career
- Ring name(s): Bad Nurse Nakamura; Nurse Nakamura; Rie Nakamura; Rie
- Billed height: 1.60 m (5 ft 3 in)
- Billed weight: 62 kg (137 lb)
- Trained by: Tarzan Goto; Megumi Kudo
- Debut: December 22, 1990
- Retired: June 2000

Rie Nakamura (中村 理恵, Nakamura Rie) is a retired Japanese professional wrestler known as Bad Nurse Nakamura (バッドナース中村, Baddonāsu Nakamura). She worked most of her career for Frontier Martial Arts Wrestling.

== Career ==
After dropping out of high school, Rie Nakamura joined the Frontier Martial Arts Wrestling Dojo, where she was trained by Tarzan Goto and Megumi Kudo. She debuted on December 22, 1990, on FMW's first all-female show, losing to Keiko Iwami, who also made her debut. After paying her dues for over two years, she finally began to move up the ranks. In August 1993, she became known as Nurse Nakamura, portraying a sweet registered nurse. She was initially paired with former IWE veteran Mr. Chin, who was periodically wrestling comedy matches for FMW, due to his diabetes. She would (kayfabe) help examine Chin's condition.

In February 1995, Nakamura joined Shark Tsuchiya's Mad Dog Military, turning heel, and became Bad Nurse Nakamura (the name was influenced by Bad News Allen). Upon turning heel, she adopted kumadori paint and wearing a short kimono. On March 30, 1995, she defeated Megumi Kudo in a decision match to win the unified FMW Women's Championship. She would hold onto the titles for over a month, before losing them to Kudo on May 5. After a year and a half feuding with Kudo, she quit the Mad Dog Military in August 1996, turned face, and changed her name to simply Rie (stylized in all capital letters). She did not have much of an impact since turning, so in 1998, she left FMW after nearly eight years with the company.

After leaving FMW, she became a freelancer, alternating between her Bad Nurse Nakamura and Rie personas as she choose. She would wrestle for Gaea Japan, Oz Academy, NEO Ladies, and Onita Pro. However, a back injury forced Nakamura to retire in June 2000.

== Retirement ==
After retiring, Nakamura remained active in pro wrestling. In 2001, she was a part-time trainer for Oz Academy. In 2004, she was an assistant manager for Kensuke Office. She was also a coach for Osaka Joshi Puroresu, most notably training Sawako Shimono.

Outside of pro wrestling, Nakamura has been running a hotel in Osaka since April 2008.

== Championships and accomplishments ==
- Frontier Martial Arts Wrestling
  - WWA World Women's Championship (1 time)
  - FMW Independent World Women's Championship (1 time)
