= Kawasaki Stadium =

Stadium in Kanagawa, Japan

Coordinates: 35°31′37.50″N 139°42′35″E

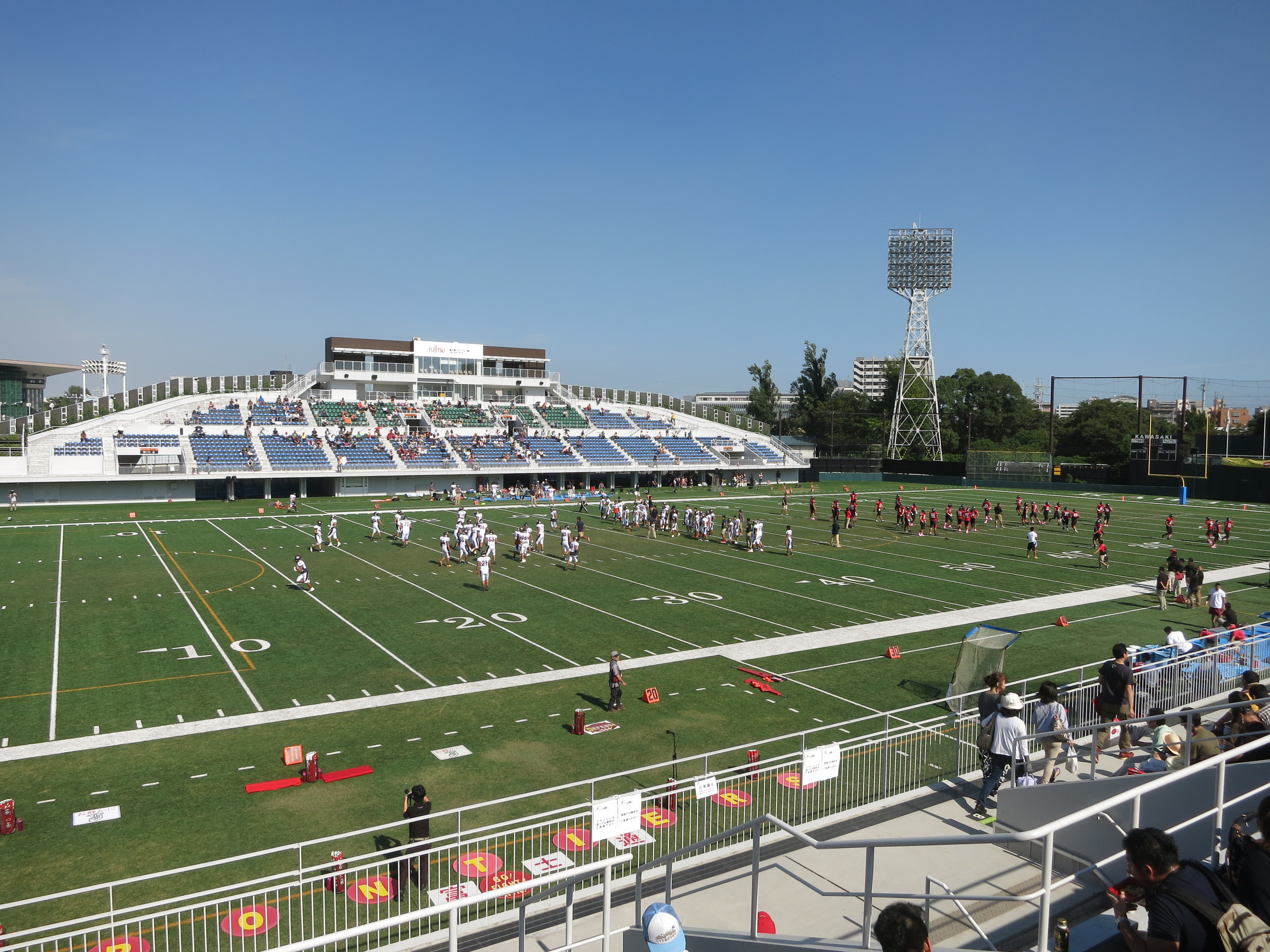
- Interactive map of Kawasaki Stadium
- Location: Kawasaki, Japan
- Owner: Kawasaki City
- Capacity: 30,000 (1952–2003); 2,700 (current)
- Surface: FieldTurf

Construction
- Opened: 1952
- Renovated: 2004

Tenants
- Taiyo Whales (1955–1977); Lotte Orions (1978–1991); Fujitsu Frontiers (1985–present)

Kawasaki Stadium (川崎球場, Kawasaki Kyūjō) is a stadium in Kawasaki, Kanagawa, Japan. The stadium was opened in 1952 and had a capacity of 30,000 people, but was demolished and rebuilt in 2003 as an American football venue and is now the home of the Fujitsu Frontiers of the X-League.

In its first incarnation, it was primarily used for baseball and was home of the Taiyo Whales until they moved to Yokohama in 1977 and became the Yokohama Taiyo Whales. It was also home to the Takahashi Unions from 1954 to 1956, before they became the Daiei Unions, and the Lotte Orions before they moved to Chiba in 1992 and became the Chiba Lotte Marines. The venue was used by Frontier Martial-Arts Wrestling for its annual Anniversary Show from 1991 to 1997 until it was demolished in 1998. FMW returned for one more show in 2001.

Preceded by First stadium	Home of the Takahashi Unions; 1954 – 1956	Succeeded by Final stadium
Preceded by Osaka Stadium	Home of the Taiyo Whales; 1955 – 1977	Succeeded by Yokohama Stadium
Preceded by Miyagi Baseball Stadium	Home of the Lotte Orions; 1978 – 1991	Succeeded by Chiba Marine Stadium
