= Frontier Martial-Arts Wrestling =

Japanese professional wrestling promotion

Frontier Martial-Arts Wrestling-Explosion
- Acronym: FMW (1989–2002, 2015–2018); FMW-E (2021–present)
- Founded: July 28, 1989 (original promotion)
- Defunct: February 15, 2002 (original promotion)
- Style: Hardcore wrestling Sports entertainment
- Headquarters: Japan
- Founder(s): Atsushi Onita (original promotion); Akihito Ichihara and Yukihide Ueno (2nd promotion); Atsushi Onita and Hidetaka Kajiki (3rd promotion)
- Owner(s): Atsushi Onita (1989–1995); Shoichi Arai (1995–2002); Akihito Ichihara and Yukihide Ueno (2015–2018); Hidetaka Kajiki (2021–present)
- Formerly: Frontier Martial-Arts Wrestling; Chō Sentō Puroresu FMW
- Successor: Initial: World Entertainment Wrestling; Wrestlings Marvelous Future; Later: Fuyuki-Gun Promotion; Apache Pro-Wrestling Army; Xtreme Wrestling Force; Pro Wrestling Freedoms; Pro-Wrestling A-Team
- Website: Official website

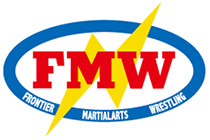
Logo of the original FMW

Frontier Martial-Arts Wrestling-Explosion (FMW-E) is a Japanese professional wrestling promotion founded on July 28, 1989, by Atsushi Onita as Frontier Martial-Arts Wrestling (フロンティア・マーシャルアーツ・レスリング, Furontia Māsharuātsu Resuringu) (FMW). The promotion specializes in hardcore wrestling involving weapons such as barbed wire and fire. They held their first show on October 6, 1989. In the late 1990s, FMW had a brief working agreement with Extreme Championship Wrestling, and as well had 14 DVDs released in the U.S. by Tokyopop. On March 4, 2015, FMW was resurrected under the name Chō Sentō Puroresu FMW (超戦闘プロレスFMW). With the resurrected FMW not holding any events since 2018, Onita announced in 2021 that he would be starting Frontier Martial-Arts Wrestling-Explosion (FMW-E) in which the promotion would specialize in exploding death matches.

The promotion was highlighted in the third season of the Vice TV's pro wrestling docuseries Dark Side of the Ring in September 2021.

== History ==
=== FMW under Atsushi Onita (1989–1995) ===
The Atsushi Onita era of FMW originally originally featured a combination of professional wrestling and martial arts competition. Its style was influenced by the Universal Wrestling Federation (UWF) and the broader shoot-style wrestling scene, blending professional wrestling with martial arts and a more combat-oriented approach. Onita would bring in American talent that were known in Japan like Jos LeDuc and Dick Murdoch, as well female talent and midget wrestlers.

As the years progressed with FMW, Onita decided to phase out the martial arts aspect of the company and focus strictly on professional wrestling. Onita would go on to have violent and bloody matches like the first ever barbed wire match in the company where he would team with Tarzan Goto as they took on the team of Mitsuhiro Matsunaga and Jerry Flynn. Onita would use real barbed wire which resulted in him receiving a nasty gash on his arm. Such matches distinguished FMW from more traditional wrestling promotions, as the use of real barbed wire and the emphasis on bloodshed introduced a more dangerous and extreme element to its in-ring presentation. As FMW continued to experiment with increasingly violent match concepts, the promotion was developing what became known as hardcore wrestling. Onita's former mentor and head of All Japan Pro Wrestling, Giant Baba disparaged FMW's violent style as "Garbage Wrestling", a term which became associated with the promotion's emphasis on bloodshed, weapons, and increasingly violent match stipulations rather than conventional technical wrestling.

Onita took the concept further in August 1990, when he faced his rival, Tarzan Goto, in what is described as the first exploding barbed wire match. In subsequent years, FMW increasingly featured wrestlers from the United States and other countries, including Chris Jericho, Lance Storm, The Original Sheik, Sabu, Damián 666, Dr. Luther, Leon Spinks, Tiger Jeet Singh and so forth.

During these years, the young Eiji Ezaki started to slowly work his way through the ranks. He was known as a prodigy in the world of wrestling and like a-lot of promotions in Japan do, send him on excursion away from the company as they will learn and develop. Ezaki would go on excursion to Mexico and wrestle for a couple of different promotions and developed the character of Hayabusa. Hayabusa became a fan favorite in the promotion for his high flying style and it was known that Hayabusa was the "ace" of FMW.

Onita was fixing to retire once again from professional wrestling and his retirement match was held at the annual May 5, Kawasaki Stadium show. This was FMW's biggest show of the year and Onita would take on Hayabusa in an exploding barbed wire cage, timebomb deathmatch.

This match now signified a changing of the guard as Onita would retire and Hayabusa would step up and be the face of FMW.

Onita would go on and sell the company to FMW ring announcer, Shoichi Arai.

=== FMW under Shoichi Arai and Hiromichi Fuyuki (1995–2002) ===
The Shoichi Arai era of FMW would end up issuing changes to the promotion and gave the promotion a new look and feel. Arai would slowly phase out the deathmatches that Atsushi Onita would help popularize and what put the company on the map and would bring in a more "sports entertainment" look and feel for the promotion that would be almost similar to that of the WWE. In a nod to the WWE, the old Brass Knuckles and Independent championships were abandoned and replaced with new titles, the World Entertainment Wrestling (WEW) championships.

Arai would enlist the help of professional wrestler, Kodo Fuyuki as both men would usher in this new era. Having Fuyuki as the booker, he would put forth his vision on how FMW should be run as Arai would sign the checks and book the arenas for the promotion.

During this time, Onita would return to professional wrestling and start a faction that would rival FMW and they were known simply as ZEN. This group was loosely based on World Championship Wrestling's group known as The New World Order. Onita would run shows under the ZEN label and these shows would feature FMW talent.

Hayabusa would continue to be featured as the ace of FMW and would go on to feud with the likes of Mr. Gannosuke, Kintaro Kanemura, and, Tetsuhiro Kuroda.

As the booker of FMW, Kodo Fuyuki also continued to wrestle and he would go on to help form the top heel faction known as Team No Respect. In 2000, FMW would sign a distribution deal with Tokyopop which would help get their product out to a Western audience as FMW could now be seen officially on VHS and DVD in the United States. They would go on to release 12 programs which were old FMW cards shortened down to feature the best matches or they were compilations of specific talent like Hayabusa. They also featured dubbed commentary from Eric Gellar and John Watanabe. Later releases would feature Dan Lovranski replacing Eric Gellar.

As the years progressed, the audiences for the live shows began to decrease and Arai would slowly sink further and further into debt. Tragedy struck the promotion on October 22, 2001, during a match with Hayabusa and Mammoth Sasaki. Hayabusa attempted a springboard moonsault—one of his signature moves—but he accidentally slipped on the ropes and fell directly on his neck, breaking it and paralyzing him. As the crowds continued to decrease, the amount of debt became too much for Arai, as he finally decided to announce that he has filed for bankruptcy and FMW would go on to have their final show on February 4, 2002. As 2001 came to a close, it was stated that Arai owed the sum of what would be the equivalent of one million US dollars to yakuza due to the money he would constantly borrow but never pay back. Running out of options, on May 16, 2002, Shoichi Arai would commit suicide so his family could collect the life insurance to pay back the money owed to the yakuza.

=== Closure and aftermath ===
The talent divided into two promotions: Kodo Fuyuki's World Entertainment Wrestling (WEW), the name of FMW's title governing body since 1999, and Mr. Gannosuke's Wrestlings Marvelous Future (WMF). Some of the talent also made appearances on Onita's special shows.

Following Fuyuki's death in 2003, most of the WEW talent under Kintaro Kanemura formed a successor promotion, Apache Pro-Wrestling Army, which continued the WEW championships until 2016 when Kanemura retired and closed the promotion. Since 2017, the WEW championships have been administered by Tomohiko Hashimoto's Pro-Wrestling A-Team promotion.

=== Chō Sentō Puroresu FMW (revival, 2015–2018) ===
On April 3, 2015, Hideki Takahashi, Hayabusa and Choden Senshi Battle Ranger held a press conference, announcing they were reviving FMW under the new name "Chō Sentō Puroresu FMW". Takahashi would serve as the president and Hayabusa as the executive producer of the promotion, which would also feature participation from Atsushi Onita. The promotion held its first event on April 21. On October 30, 2015, they announced that they were reviving the FMW World Street Fight 6-Man Tag Team Championship, as they set a match to determine new champions on December 22.

In 2016, two tragedies had befallen FMW. On February 17, 2016, Ray would announce that she had inoperable stage three brain cancer after being diagnosed with a tumor in December 2015. She would succumb to the disease in 2018, she was 36 years old. On March 3, 2016, Hayabusa would pass away at his home from a brain aneurysm, he was 47 years old.

On October 31, 2017, FMW founder Atsushi Onita retired after 43 years in the ring. The promotion held its most recent event as Chō Sentō Puroresu FMW in 2018. Although not officially closing once again the revival seemed to have been forgotten about.

=== FMW-E (second revival, 2021–present) ===
In 2018, Onita would come out of retirement at a Pro-Wrestling A-Tean (Apache Army's successor promotion) event. After this he would come back as a wrestler having matches with Combat Zone Wrestling, Big Japan Pro-Wrestling, World Wonder Ring Stardom and DDT Pro-Wrestling.

In 2021, Onita announced that he would be starting Frontier Martial-Arts Wrestling-Explosion, a promotion under the FMW name that specialized in exploding death matches, a match type in which Onita became famous for. The new promotion will have Hidetaka Kajiki serving as president. Onita stated he got the idea for the promotion after All Elite Wrestling's 2021 Revolution PPV in which the event held an exploding barbed wire death match and seeing that there was still a market for these types of matches internationally in the pro wrestling world and with the popularity of online media streaming the new promotion was formed. The promotion, however, held its last card to date on December 19, 2021, after which Onita went freelance yet again. In October 2022, FMW-E started back up promoting cards.

== Personnel ==
=== Current FMW-E roster ===
- Andreza Giant Panda
- Atsushi Onita
- Gabai Jai-chan
- Hasegawa
- Hiro Takita
- Kyoya Okazaki
- Maku Donaruto
- Mejiro Kid
- Miss Mongol
- Monster Leather
- Naoshi Sano
- Nene Mugen Dai
- Noriyuki Yoshida
- Onryo
- Pandita
- Mr. Pogo #3
- Raijin Yaguchi
- Ricky Fuji
- Shooter
- Skull Reaper A-ji
- Takumi Sakurai
- Umanosuke Ueda #2
- Yuichi Taniguchi

=== FMW alumni ===
Deceased individuals are indicated with a dagger (†).

- Aja Kong
- Akira Hokuto
- Alex Pourteau
- Alexander Otsuka
- The American Dragon
- Atsushi Onita
- Axl Rotten †
- Ayako Hamada
- Badboy Hido †
- Bad Nurse Nakamura
- Balls Mahoney †
- Bam Bam Bigelow †
- Bambi
- Big Titan †
- Big Van Vader †
- Bill Alfonso
- Bull Nakano
- Cactus Jack
- Captain Jack †
- Chigusa Nagayo
- Chocoball Mukai
- Chris Candido †
- Chris Chetti
- Chris Jericho
- Chris Youngblood †
- Combat Toyoda
- Crazy Boy
- Crusher Dennis
- Crypt the Keeper
- Daisuke Ikeda
- Damián 666
- Despina Montagas
- Dick Murdoch †
- Dory Funk Jr.
- The Dragon Master †
- Dragon Winger
- Dudley Boyz
- Francine
- Mr. Gannosuke
- Gedo
- Gekko
- Genichiro Tenryu
- Giant Steele
- The Gladiator †
- The Great Kabuki
- The Great Sasuke
- Grigory Verichev †
- Dr. Hannibal
- Hayabusa †
- The Headhunters
- Hideki Hosaka †
- Hisakatsu Oya
- Horace Boulder
- Jado
- Jerry Blayman
- Jimmy Backlund †
- Jimmy Snuka †
- Jinsei Shinzaki
- Jos LeDuc †
- John Kronus †
- John Tolos †
- Jun Kasai
- Kaori Nakayama
- Katsuji Ueda †
- Keisuke Yamada
- Ken Shamrock
- Kenta Kobashi
- Kevin Sullivan
- Kevin Wacholz
- Kikutaro
- Killer Kowalski †
- Kintaro Kanemura
- Kodo Fuyuki †
- Koji Nakagawa
- Konnan the Great
- Kyoko Inoue
- Lance Cade †
- Lance Storm
- Leon Spinks †
- Lioness Asuka
- Lola González
- Dr. Luther
- Magnificent Mimi
- Mammoth Sasaki
- Manami Toyota
- Mark Starr †
- Masashi Aoyagi †
- Masato Tanaka
- Mascarita Dorada
- Maunakea Mossman
- Megumi Kudo
- Men's Teioh
- Mercenario #2
- Miguel Pérez Jr.
- Mitsuhiro Matsunaga
- Miwa Sato
- Muhammad Yone
- Naomichi Marufuji
- Neftali
- Nosawa
- One Man Gang
- Onryo
- Pat Tanaka
- Pirata Morgan
- Pitbull #1
- Mr. Pogo †
- Raven
- Ray †
- Rey Bucanero Jr.
- Reggie Bennett
- Rey Misterio
- Rhonda Sing †
- Ricky Banderas
- Ricky Fuji
- Rob Van Dam
- Rock 'n' Roll Express
- Sabu †
- The Samoans †
- The Sandman
- Shane Douglas
- Shark Tsuchiya
- Shawn Michaels
- The Sheik †
- Shinobu Kandori
- Shocker
- Shoichi Arai †
- Shoichi Funaki
- Super Crazy
- Super Delfin
- Super Leather †
- Super Nova
- Supreme
- Svetlana Goundarenko
- Sweet Georgia Brown
- Taka Michinoku
- Tamon Honda
- Tarzan Goto †
- Terry Funk †
- Tetsuhiro Kuroda
- Tiger Ali Singh
- Tiger Jackson
- Tiger Jeet Singh
- Tommy Dreamer
- Tomohiko Hashimoto
- Tracy Smothers †
- Tsuyoshi Kikuchi
- Último Dragón
- Vic Grimes
- Víctor Quiñones †
- White African †
- Willie Williams †
- Yone Genjin
- Yoshiaki Fujiwara
- Yoshihiro Tajiri
- Yoshinobu Kanemaru

== Championships and accomplishments ==
=== Defunct championships ===
| Championship | Date of entry | First champion(s) (Tag team name) | Date retired | Last champion(s) (Tag team name) | Years active | Notes |
|---|---|---|---|---|---|---|
| AWA World Light Heavyweight Championship | 1989 | Jimmy Backlund | April 1992 | Dr. Luther | 1989–1992 | FMW began using the title shortly after the promotion's creation and recognized it as its junior heavyweight championship. However, the title changes in FMW were not recognized by the American Wrestling Association (AWA). |
| WWA World Brass Knuckles Heavyweight Championship | January 7, 1990 | Beast the Barbarian | February 27, 1991 | Atsushi Onita | 1990–1991 | The title was initially established as the WWA World Brass Knuckles Heavyweight Championship and later replaced by the WWA World Martial Arts Heavyweight Championship. |
| WWA World Women's Championship | November 5, 1990 | Combat Toyoda | February 15, 1994 | Crusher Maedomari | 1990–1994 | The title was unified with the new FMW Independent Women's Championship in 1994. |
| WWA World Martial Arts Heavyweight Championship | February 27, 1991 | Grigory Verichev | August 28, 1993 | Atsushi Onita | 1991–1993 | The title replaced the former WWA World Brass Knuckles Heavyweight Championship as the company's primary championship. It was replaced by the FMW Brass Knuckles Heavyweight Championship in 1993. |
| WWA World Martial Arts Tag Team Championship | December 9, 1991 | Atsushi Onita and Tarzan Goto | September 19, 1992 | Grigory Verichev and Tarzan Goto | 1991–1992 | The title was initially created as the WWA World Martial Arts Tag Team Championship and vacated it in 1992 to be replaced by the FMW Brass Knuckles Tag Team Championship. |
| WWA World Martial Arts Junior Heavyweight Championship | April 1992 | Dr. Luther | 1993 | Dr. Luther | 1992–1993 | FMW renamed the previous AWA World Light Heavyweight Championship as the WWA World Martial Arts Junior Heavyweight Championship to distinguish it from the AWA-recognized championship. The title was retired in 1993. |
| FMW Brass Knuckles Heavyweight Championship | August 27, 1993 | Atsushi Onita | August 25, 1999 | Hayabusa | 1993–1999 | FMW Brass Knuckles Heavyweight Championship replaced the former WWA World Martial Arts Heavyweight Championship as the company's premier title. The title was abandoned in favor of the WEW Singles Championship in 1999. |
| FMW Independent World Junior Heavyweight Championship | October 28, 1993 | The Great Sasuke | May 31, 1999 | Naoki Sano | 1993–1999 | FMW introduced the title as a replacement to the WWA World Martial Arts Light Heavyweight Championship. FMW discontinued the title after May 31, 1999, and the title has since been defended in various Japanese independent promotions. |
| FMW Brass Knuckles Tag Team Championship | January 18, 1994 | Big Titan and The Gladiator | June 16, 1999 | Gedo and Koji Nakagawa | 1994–1999 | The title replaced the former WWA World Martial Arts Tag Team Championship as the company's tag team title. The title was renamed by Kodo Fuyuki as the WEW World Tag Team Championship in 1999. |
| FMW Women's Championship | February 15, 1994 | Megumi Kudo | September 28, 1997 | Shark Tsuchiya | 1994–1997 | The title was created as the FMW Independent Women's Championship during a tournament and unified with the WWA World Women's Championship. The FMW Women's Championship was then represented by both the FMW Independent Women's Championship and WWA World Women's Championship belts. The title was deactivated in 1997 as the women's division of FMW ended with the departure of the final champion Shark Tsuchiya. |
| FMW World Street Fight 6-Man Tag Team Championship | May 5, 1996 | Puerto Rican Army (Headhunter A, Headhunter B and Super Leather) | October 27, 2016 | Atsushi Onita, Hideki Hosaka and Sean Guinness | 1996–1998; 2015–2016 | The title was awarded to the departing Atsushi Onita as a tribute for establishing FMW and making it a success and was abandoned as a result. The title was later brought back in the resurrected FMW in 2015 and abandoned in 2016 in favor of the new FMW World Street Fight 8-Man Tag Team Championship. |
| FMW World Street Fight 8-Man Tag Team Championship | November 24, 2016 | The Tiger Clan | August 2018 | The Tiger Clan | 2016–2018 | The initial champions were The Tiger Clan (Great Tiger, Tiger Mask #3, Black Tiger #5, Black Tiger #7) The titles would go defunct in 2018 as Chō Sentō Puroresu FMW would become dormant. |
| FMW Independent Heavyweight Championship | August 1, 1996 | W*ING Kanemura | August 25, 1999 | Masato Tanaka | 1996–1999 | The title was originally designed as Atsushi Onita's FMW Brass Knuckles Heavyweight Championship title belt for his retirement match at FMW 6th Anniversary Show but could not be available at the moment and was finally shipped to FMW in 1996 and used as the company's second world title. The title was abandoned in favor of the WEW Single Championship in 1999. |
| WEW World Tag Team Championship | June 16, 1999 | Gedo and Koji Nakagawa | February 15, 2002 | Kodo Fuyuki and The Sandman | 1999–2002 | The former FMW Brass Knuckles Tag Team Championship was renamed and changed to the WEW World Tag Team Championship in 1999. The title has been defended in World Entertainment Wrestling (WEW), Apache Army and A-Team after FMW's closure in 2002. |
| WEW 6-Man Tag Team Championship | July 31, 1999 | Team No Respect (Gedo, Kodo Fuyuki and Koji Nakagawa) | February 15, 2002 | GOEMON, Hayabusa and Tetsuhiro Kuroda | 1999–2002 | The title was defended in World Entertainment Wrestling (WEW) after FMW's closure in 2002 until being retired in 2004. |
| WEW Hardcore Championship | September 24, 1999 | Kintaro Kanemura | May 22, 2001 | Kintaro Kanemura | 1999–2001 | Kanemura retired the title in 2001. |
| WEW Singles / World Heavyweight Championship | September 24, 1999 | Kodo Fuyuki | February 15, 2002 | Kodo Fuyuki | 1999–2002 | The championship was created as the WEW Singles Championship before being renamed the WEW World Heavyweight Championship. The title was defended in World Entertainment Wrestling (WEW), Apache Army and A-Team after FMW's closure in 2002. |
| WEW Hardcore Tag Team Championship | April 25, 2000 | Hideki Hosaka and Yoshinori Sasaki | February 15, 2002 | Daisuke Sekimoto and Men's Teioh | 2000–2002 | The title was defended in Big Japan Pro Wrestling (BJW), Kaientai Dojo, Pro Wrestling Freedoms, and several Japanese independent promotions after FMW's closure in 2002. |

== Events ==
=== Primary events ===
- FMW Anniversary Show
- Summer Spectacular
- Fall Spectacular
- Year End Spectacular

=== Interpromotional events ===
- ECW/FMW Supershow (with ECW)
- FMW/WWA in Los Angeles (with WWA)
- FMW/MPW (with MPW)
- FMW/LLPW/AJW (with LLPW and AJW)
- Super Extreme Wrestling War (with ECW)

== See also ==
- List of FMW supercards and pay-per-view events
- List of Frontier Martial-Arts Wrestling tournaments
- Professional wrestling in Japan
- List of professional wrestling promotions in Japan
- All Japan Pro Wrestling
- W*ING
- Apache Pro-Wrestling Army
