= Tennōzan (professional wrestling) =

Osaka Pro Wrestling event series

- Promotions: Osaka Pro Wrestling
- First event: Tennōzan (2000)
- Event gimmick: Single-elimination tournament

The Tennōzan (Note: Japanese: 天王山; sometimes transcribed as Ten-No-Zan, Ten-Nou-Zan or Tenno-zan) is a single elimination professional wrestling tournament held in late autumn by the Osaka Pro Wrestling (OPW) promotion. It has been held annually since 2000 except in 2014, 2016–2017, and 2019–2021. It is considered the most prominent tournament in OPW.

The number of participants in the Tennōzan has varied over the years, from a lowest of 12 in 2001 to a highest of 24 in 2011. Naohiro Hoshikawa is the inaugural winner; "Big Boss" Ma-g-ma holds the record for most tournaments wins with three, while Billyken Kid, Daisuke Harada, Tigers Mask and Zeus have won two each. Ma-g-ma is also the only wrestler to have won three consecutive tournaments.

== Tournament finals ==
| # | Event | Date | Venue | Location | Attendance | Final | Ref. |
|---|---|---|---|---|---|---|---|
| 1 | Tennōzan 2000 Final | October 15, 2000 | Osaka NGK Studio | Osaka, Japan | 474 | Super Delfin vs. Naohiro Hoshikawa | |
| 2 | Osaka Pro Story #7: Tennōzan 2001 the Final!! | October 30, 2001 | Osaka Prefectural Gymnasium #2 | Osaka, Japan | 762 | Takehiro Murahama vs. Super Delfin | |
| 3 | Osaka Pro Story #15: Tennōzan 2002 the Final!! | November 9, 2002 | Osaka Prefectural Gymnasium #2 | Osaka, Japan | 672 | "Big Boss" Ma-g-ma vs. Takehiro Murahama | |
| 4 | Osaka Pro Story #21: Tennōzan 2003 the Final!! | November 9, 2003 | Matsushita IMP Hall | Osaka, Japan | 900 | "Big Boss" Ma-g-ma vs. Billyken Kid | |
| 5 | Osaka Pro Story #26: Tennōzan 2004 the Final!! | November 3, 2004 | Matsushita IMP Hall | Osaka, Japan | 807 | Billyken Kid vs. "Big Boss" Ma-g-ma | |
| 6 | Osaka Pro Story #30: Tennōzan 2005 the Final!! | December 3, 2005 | Matsushita IMP Hall | Osaka, Japan | 748 | Super Dolphin vs. Toru Owashi | |
| 7 | Osaka Pro Story #36: Tennōzan 2006 the Final!! | November 5, 2006 | Matsushita IMP Hall | Osaka, Japan | 753 | Tigers Mask vs. Gaina | |
| 8 | Osaka Pro Story #40: Tennōzan 2007 the Final!! | December 2, 2007 | Matsushita IMP Hall | Osaka, Japan | 652 | Tigers Mask vs. Zeus | |
| 9 | Osaka Pro Story #46: Tennōzan 2008 the Final!! | December 7, 2008 | Matsushita IMP Hall | Osaka, Japan | 669 | Black Buffalo vs. Billyken Kid | |
| 10 | Osaka Pro Story #50: Pink Ribbon Charity | December 6, 2009 | Matsushita IMP Hall | Osaka, Japan | 731 | Magnitude Kishiwada vs. Billyken Kid | |
| 11 | Tennōzan 2010 | December 26, 2010 | Matsushita IMP Hall | Osaka, Japan | 732 | Kuuga vs. Daisuke Harada | |
| 12 | Tennōzan 2011 | December 18, 2011 | Matsushita IMP Hall | Osaka, Japan | 695 | Kuuga vs. Daisuke Harada | |
| 13 | Tennōzan 2012 Final! | December 16, 2012 | Matsushita IMP Hall | Osaka, Japan | 506 | Daisuke Harada vs. Hub | |
| 14 | Tennōzan 2013 | December 23, 2013 | Matsushita IMP Hall | Osaka, Japan | 351 | The Bodyguard vs. Zeus | |
| 15 | Osaka Pro's Business Is Thriving!: Tennōzan Final | January 31, 2016 | Osaka Minato Ward Citizen Center | Osaka, Japan | 197 | Tadasuke vs. Kaiju New World | |
| 16 | We Are Osaka Pro! 2018: Tennōzan Final | November 24, 2018 | Azalea Taisho Hall | Osaka, Japan | 186 | Ultimate Spider Jr. vs. Tsubasa | |
| 17 | Tennōzan 2022: Who Is the Strongest! Tournament | October 10, 2022 | Azalea Taisho Hall | Osaka, Japan | 300 | Tigers Mask vs. Toru | |
| 18 | Tennōzan 2023 | October 29, 2023 | 176Box | Osaka, Japan | 519 | Zeus vs. Toru | |
| 19 | Tennōzan 2024 | September 23, 2024 | Azalea Taisho Hall | Osaka, Japan | 332 | Shigehiro Irie vs. Toru | |
| 20 | Tennōzan 2025 | September 28, 2025 | Azalea Taisho Hall | Osaka, Japan | 345 | Kazuaki Mihara vs. Ryuya Matsufusa | |
| 21 | Tennōzan 2026 | September 23, 2026 | Azalea Taisho Hall | Osaka, Japan | 327 | Kazuaki Mihara vs. Aran Sano | |

== Tournaments ==
| Year | Winner | Times won | Participants |
|---|---|---|---|
| 2000 | Naohiro Hoshikawa | 1 | 16 |
| 2001 | Super Delfin | 1 | 12 |
| 2002 | "Big Boss" Ma-g-ma | 1 | 16 |
| 2003 | "Big Boss" Ma-g-ma | 2 | 16 |
| 2004 | "Big Boss" Ma-g-ma | 3 | 16 |
| 2005 | Super Dolphin | 1 | 16 |
| 2006 | Gaina | 1 | 16 |
| 2007 | Tigers Mask | 1 | 16 |
| 2008 | Billyken Kid | 1 | 16 |
| 2009 | Billyken Kid | 2 | 16 |
| 2010 | Kuuga | 1 | 16 |
| 2011 | Daisuke Harada | 1 | 24 |
| 2012 | Daisuke Harada | 2 | 16 |
| 2013 | Zeus | 1 | 16 |
| 2015 | Tadasuke | 1 | 14 |
| 2018 | Tsubasa | 1 | 14 |
| 2022 | Tigers Mask | 2 | 16 |
| 2023 | Zeus | 2 | 16 |
| 2024 | Toru | 1 | 16 |
| 2025 | Ryuya Matsufusa | 1 | 14 |
| 2026 | Kazuaki Mihara | 1 | 16 |

== Results ==
=== 2000 ===
Tennōzan 2000
- Promotion: Osaka Pro Wrestling
- Date: September 16 – October 15, 2000
- City: Osaka, Japan
- Venue: Osaka NGK Studio

Tennōzan chronology
| ← Previous — | Next → 2001 |

The 2000 Tennōzan was held from September 16 to October 15.

Round 1 September 16, 17, 23, 24
Black Buffalo | Pin
Masato Yakushiji | 14:49
Ebessan | 10:12
Daio Quällt | Sub
Super Demekin | 9:16
Yoshihito Sugamoto | Sub
Super Delfin | Sub
Kuishinbo Kamen | 19:25
Tsubasa | Pin
The Monkey Magic | 8:24
Policeme～n | 7:54
Takehiro Murahama | Sub
Kaiju Zeta Mandora | 14:34
Naohiro Hoshikawa | Pin
Dick Togo | Sub
Takashi Tachibana | 6:31

Round 2 September 30, October 1
Black Buffalo | Stop
Daio Quällt | 20:06
Yoshihito Sugamoto | 14:18
Super Delfin | Sub
Tsubasa | Pin
Takehiro Murahama | 13:02
Naohiro Hoshikawa | Pin
Dick Togo | 17:27

Semifinals; October 7, 8
Black Buffalo | 17:38
Super Delfin | Sub
Tsubasa | 19:07
Naohiro Hoshikawa | Pin

Final; October 15
Super Delfin | 23:02
Naohiro Hoshikawa | Pin

=== 2001 ===
Tennōzan 2001
- Promotion: Osaka Pro Wrestling
- Date: September 15 – October 30, 2001
- City: Osaka, Japan
- Venue: Various; Final: Osaka Prefectural Gymnasium #2

Tennōzan chronology
| ← Previous; 2000 | Next → 2002 |

The 2001 Tennōzan was held from September 15 to October 30.

Round 1 September 15, 22
Ebessan | Pin
Kaiju King Mandora | 9:08
Tsubasa | 23:45
Azteca | Pin
Super Demekin | 24:00
Black Buffalo | Pin
Kaiju Zeta Mandora | 17:29
Super Delfin | Pin

Round 2 September 29, October 6
Gamma | Pin
Ebessan | 8:49
Azteca | 13:38
Takehiro Murahama | Sub
Kuishinbo Kamen | 11:07
Black Buffalo | Sub
Super Delfin | Sub
Miracleman | 11:47

Semifinals; October 13, 20
Gamma | 13:08
Takehiro Murahama | Pin
Black Buffalo | 20:25
Super Delfin | Stop

Final; October 30
Takehiro Murahama | 21:25
Super Delfin | Pin

=== 2002 ===
Tennōzan 2002
- Promotion: Osaka Pro Wrestling
- Date: October 20 – November 9, 2002
- City: Osaka, Japan
- Venue: Various; Final: Osaka Prefectural Gymnasium #2

Tennōzan chronology
| ← Previous; 2001 | Next → 2003 |

The 2002 Tennōzan was held from October 20 to November 9.

Round 1 October 20, 26
Super Delfin | 27:25
Tsubasa | Pin
Kaiju King Mandora | 8:14
"Big Boss" Ma-g-ma | Pin
Tigers Mask | Pin
Kuishinbo Kamen | 9:39
Gamma | Pin
Azteca | 13:00
Takehiro Murahama | Sub
Miracleman | 13:39
Ebessan | 8:53
Daio Quällt | Pin
Kengo Takai | 4:10
Black Buffalo | Sub
Billyken Kid | 14:01
El Samurai | Sub

Round 2 November 2
Tsubasa | 15:47
"Big Boss" Ma-g-ma | Sub
Tigers Mask | 6:28
Gamma | Pin
Takehiro Murahama | Sub
Daio Quällt | 16:46
Black Buffalo | 16:51
El Samurai | Pin

Semifinals; November 9
"Big Boss" Ma-g-ma | Pin
Gamma | 11:13
Takehiro Murahama | Sub
El Samurai | 11:57

Final; November 9
"Big Boss" Ma-g-ma | Pin
Takehiro Murahama | 11:43

=== 2003 ===
Tennōzan 2003
- Promotion: Osaka Pro Wrestling
- Date: October 18 – November 9, 2003
- City: Osaka, Japan
- Venue: Various; Final: Matsushita IMP Hall

Tennōzan chronology
| ← Previous; 2002 | Next → 2004 |

The 2003 Tennōzan was held from October 18 to November 9.

Round 1 October 18, 25
"Big Boss" Ma-g-ma | KO
Black Buffalo | 27:38
Goa | Pin
Azteca | 13:02
Tsubasa | Sub
Kuishinbo Kamen | 13:39
Miracleman | TKO
Gran Hamada | 5:58
Takehiro Murahama | Pin
Ebessan | 15:09
Perro | 16:48
Tigers Mask | Pin
Billyken Kid | Pin
Daio Quällt | 21:36
Yutaka Fukuda | 10:21
Gentaro | Pin

Round 2 November 1
"Big Boss" Ma-g-ma | Pin
Goa | 15:23
Tsubasa | Pin
Miracleman | 18:13
Takehiro Murahama | 11:08
Tigers Mask | Pin
Billyken Kid | Pin
Gentaro | 17:43

Semifinals; November 9
"Big Boss" Ma-g-ma | Pin
Tsubasa | 17:21
Tigers Mask | 13:45
Billyken Kid | Pin

Final; November 9
"Big Boss" Ma-g-ma | Pin
Billyken Kid | 19:30

=== 2004 ===
Tennōzan 2004
- Promotion: Osaka Pro Wrestling
- Date: October 16 – November 3, 2004
- City: Osaka, Japan
- Venue: Various; Final: Matsushita IMP Hall

Tennōzan chronology
| ← Previous; 2003 | Next → 2005 |

The 2004 Tennōzan was held from October 16 to November 3.

Round 1 October 16, 23
Billyken Kid | Pin
Masato Matoba | 2:17
Black Buffalo | 15:36
Daio Quällt | Pin
Gamma | 11:51
Tigers Mask | Pin
Kuishinbo Kamen | 9:41
Takaku Fuke | Sub
"Kabuto" Beetle | 13:56
Perro | Pin
Yutaka | 9:26
Takehiro Murahama | Pin
Goa | Pin
Ebessan | 12:11
Katsuhiko Nakajima | 12:26
"Big Boss" Ma-g-ma | Pin

Round 2 October 29
Billyken Kid | Pin
Daio Quällt | 16:45
Tigers Mask | Pin
Takaku Fuke | 16:10
Perro | Pin
Takehiro Murahama | 10:31
Goa | 16:36
"Big Boss" Ma-g-ma | Pin

Semifinals; November 3
Billyken Kid | Pin
Tigers Mask | 15:31
Perro | 9:17
"Big Boss" Ma-g-ma | Pin

Final; November 3
Billyken Kid | 18:04
"Big Boss" Ma-g-ma | Pin

=== 2005 ===
Tennōzan 2005
- Promotion: Osaka Pro Wrestling
- Date: November 5 – December 3, 2005
- City: Osaka, Japan
- Venue: Various; Final: Matsushita IMP Hall

Tennōzan chronology
| ← Previous; 2004 | Next → 2006 |

The 2005 Tennōzan was held from November 5 to December 3.

Round 1 November 5, 12
Black Buffalo | Sub
Masamune | 19:22
Ebessan II | 13:01
Takaku Fuke | Sub
Kuishinbo Kamen | 11:58
Hideyoshi | Pin
Tsubasa | 26:44
Super Dolphin | Pin
Miracleman | Pin
La Uchida | 12:55
Tigers Mask | 19:23
Toru Owashi | Pin
Atsushi Kotoge | 10:18
Hisakatsu Oya | Pin
Billyken Kid | Pin
El Pantera | 15:41

Round 2 November 19
Black Buffalo | Sub
Takaku Fuke | 14:15
Hideyoshi | 21:17
Super Dolphin | Pin
Miracleman | 13:44
Toru Owashi | Pin
Hisakatsu Oya | 14:57
Billyken Kid | Pin

Semifinals; November 26
Black Buffalo | 18:01
Super Dolphin | Pin
Toru Owashi | Pin
Billyken Kid | 19:03

Final; December 3
Super Dolphin | Pin
Toru Owashi | 18:48
Third place
Black Buffalo | 19:47
Billyken Kid | Pin

=== 2006 ===
Tennōzan 2006
- Promotion: Osaka Pro Wrestling
- Date: October 9 – November 5, 2006
- City: Osaka, Japan
- Venue: Various; Final: Matsushita IMP Hall

Tennōzan chronology
| ← Previous; 2005 | Next → 2007 |

The 2006 Tennōzan was held from October 9 to November 5.

Round 1 October 9, 21
Fujita "Jr." Hayato | Sub
Kuishinbo Kamen | 8:23
Miracleman | Pin
Asian Condor | 10:02
Tigers Mask | Pin
Gran Naniwa | 16:05
Masamune | 21:31
Hideyoshi | Pin
Gaina | Pin
Takaku Fuke | 8:23
Flash Moon | 9:34
Atsushi Kotoge | Pin
Súper Astro | 16:52
Billyken Kid | Pin
Mineo Fujita | 13:48
Asian Cougar | Sub

Round 2 October 28
Fujita "Jr." Hayato | Stop
Miracleman | 11:57
Tigers Mask | Pin
Hideyoshi | 21:44
Gaina | Pin
Atsushi Kotoge | 9:17
Billyken Kid | Pin
Asian Cougar | 18:16

Semifinals; November 5
Fujita "Jr." Hayato' | 11:11
Tigers Mask | Stop
Gaina | Pin
Billyken Kid | 9:40

Final; November 5
Tigers Mask | 16:39
Gaina | Pin

=== 2007 ===
Tennōzan 2007
- Promotion: Osaka Pro Wrestling
- Date: November 10 – December 2, 2007
- City: Osaka, Japan
- Venue: Various; Final: Matsushita IMP Hall

Tennōzan chronology
| ← Previous; 2006 | Next → 2008 |

The 2007 Tennōzan was held from November 10 to December 2.

Round 1 November 10, 17
Black Buffalo | Pin
Flash Moon | 12:55
Takaku Fuke | 18:42
Tigers Mask | Pin
Kuishinbo Kamen | 10:57
Gaina | Pin
Zero | Pin
Atsushi Kotoge | 15:24
Asian Cougar | Pin
Hideyoshi | 15:36
Masamune | Sub
Condor | 9:12
Super Delfin | 6:22
Zeus | Pin
Daisuke Harada | Pin
Miracleman | 10:25

Round 2 November 24
Black Buffalo | 7:23
Tigers Mask | Pin
Gaina | Pin
Zero | 26:08
Asian Cougar | Pin
Masamune | 17:55
Zeus | Pin
Daisuke Harada | 11:00

Semifinals; December 2
Tigers Mask | Pin
Gaina | 17:03
Asian Cougar | 12:20
Zeus | Pin

Final; December 2
Tigers Mask | Pin
Zeus | 14:22

=== 2008 ===
Tennōzan 2008
- Promotion: Osaka Pro Wrestling
- Date: November 23 – December 7, 2008
- City: Osaka, Japan
- Venue: Various; Final: Matsushita IMP Hall

Tennōzan chronology
| ← Previous; 2007 | Next → 2009 |

The 2008 Tennōzan was held from November 23 to December 7.

Round 1 November 23, 24, 29
Hideyoshi | Sub
Takaku Fuke | 12:15
Miracleman | Pin
Kuishinbo Kamen | 12:58
Masanori Ishikura | Stop
Tadasuke | 14:05
Black Buffalo | Pin
Tsubasa | 14:50
Billyken Kid | Pin
Masamune | 18:31
Zeus | 8:04
Orochi | CO
Asian Cougar | Pin
Tigers Mask | 14:28
Daisuke Harada | Pin
Atsushi Kotoge | 20:01

Round 2 November 30
Hideyoshi | Sub
Miracleman | 16:15
Masanori Ishikura | 12:47
Black Buffalo | Pin
Billyken Kid | Pin (Note: This match originally ended in a double countout at 14:01, and was restarted with Billyken Kid winning by pinfall in 2:59.)
Orochi | 2:59
Asian Cougar | Pin
Daisuke Harada | 15:58

Semifinals; December 7
Hideyoshi | 8:41
Black Buffalo | Pin
Billyken Kid | TKO
Asian Cougar | 1:59

Final; December 7
Black Buffalo | 18:48
Billyken Kid | Pin

=== 2009 ===
Tennōzan 2009
- Promotion: Osaka Pro Wrestling
- Date: November 14 – December 6, 2009
- City: Osaka, Japan
- Venue: Various; Final: Matsushita IMP Hall

Tennōzan chronology
| ← Previous; 2008 | Next → 2010 |

The 2009 Tennōzan was held from November 14 to December 6.

Round 1 November 14, 21, 22, 23
Magnitude Kishiwada | Pin
Daisuke Harada | 17:24
Black Buffalo | Pin
Tadasuke | 8:20
Masamune | Sub
Kuishinbo Kamen | 17:38
Atsushi Kotoge | Pin
Kazuaki Mihara | 18:17
Tigers Mask | Sub
Miracleman | 21:07
The Bodyguard | 15:38
Hideyoshi | Sub
Asian Cougar | Sub
Orochi | 15:07
Billyken Kid | Pin
Yoshihito Sasaki | 15:15

Round 2 November 28
Magnitude Kishiwada | TKO
Black Buffalo | 23:24
Masamune | 13:16
Atsushi Kotoge | Pin
Tigers Mask | Sub
Hideyoshi | 26:33
Asian Cougar | 12:07
Billyken Kid | Pin

Semifinals; November 29
Magnitude Kishiwada | 12:55
Atsushi Kotoge | TKO
Tigers Mask | 39:42
Billyken Kid | Pin

Final; December 6
Magnitude Kishiwada | 30:19
Billyken Kid | Pin

=== 2010 ===
Tennōzan 2010
- Promotion: Osaka Pro Wrestling
- Date: December 5–26, 2010
- City: Osaka, Japan
- Venue: Various; Final: Matsushita IMP Hall

Tennōzan chronology
| ← Previous; 2009 | Next → 2011 |

The 2010 Tennōzan was held from December 5 to December 26.

Round 1 December 5, 12
Kuuga | Pin
Masamune | 19:19
Atsushi Kotoge | 25:35
Tsubasa | Sub
Kanjyuro Matsuyama | Pin
Ultimate Spider Jr. | 12:10
Billyken Kid | 26:49
Hideyoshi | Sub
Daisuke Harada | Pin
Black Buffalo | 22:52
The Bodyguard | Pin
Zeus | 9:36
Tigers Mask | Stop
Miracleman | 17:19
Orochi | 22:07
Tadasuke | Pin

Round 2 December 19
Kuuga | Pin
Tsubasa | 9:01
Kanjyuro Matsuyama | 7:14
Hideyoshi | Stop
Daisuke Harada | Pin
The Bodyguard | 8:08
Tigers Mask | Pin
Tadasuke | 15:48

Semifinals; December 23
Kuuga | Pin
Hideyoshi | 22:00
Daisuke Harada | Pin
Tigers Mask | 28:25

Final; December 26
Kuuga | Pin
Daisuke Harada | 24:48

=== 2011 ===
Tennōzan 2011
- Promotion: Osaka Pro Wrestling
- Date: November 27 – December 18, 2011
- City: Osaka, Japan
- Venue: Various; Final: Matsushita IMP Hall

Tennōzan chronology
| ← Previous; 2010 | Next → 2012 |

The 2011 Tennōzan was held from November 27 to December 18.

Round 1 November 27, December 3
Black Buffalo | 9:24
Jigsaw | Pin
Tsubasa | 15:35
Orochi | Pin
Ultimate Spider Jr. | 17:45
Keizo Matsuda | Pin
Kuuga | Pin
Tadasuke | 14:03
Atsushi Kotoge | 23:19
Daisuke Harada | Pin
Kanjyuro Matsuyama | 14:42
Kuishinbo Kamen | Pin
Takoyakida | 7:48
Cosmo☆Soldier | Sub
Billyken Kid | Pin
Naoki Setoguchi | 3:28

Round 2 December 4, 10
Jigsaw | Sub
The Bodyguard | 6:45
Orochi | Pin
Kazuaki Mihara | 13:11
Keizo Matsuda | 14:49
Zeus | Pin
Kuuga | Pin
Ebessan III | 5:17
Daisuke Harada | Pin
Masamune | 11:16
Kuishinbo Kamen | 13:36
Hayata | Sub
Cosmo☆Soldier | 17:30
Hideyoshi | Sub
Billyken Kid | DKO
Tigers Mask | 24:34

Round 3 December 11
Jigsaw | Pin
Orochi | 18:58
Zeus | 12:15
Kuuga | Sub
Daisuke Harada | Pin
Hayata | 16:04
Hideyoshi | Bye
— | —

Semifinals; December 18
Jigsaw | 8:05
Kuuga | Pin
Daisuke Harada | Pin
Hideyoshi | 19:34

Final; December 18
Kuuga | 17:40
Daisuke Harada | Pin

=== 2012 ===
Tennōzan 2012
- Promotion: Osaka Pro Wrestling
- Date: November 25 – December 16, 2012
- City: Osaka, Japan
- Venue: Various; Final: Matsushita IMP Hall

Tennōzan chronology
| ← Previous; 2011 | Next → 2013 |

The 2012 Tennōzan was held from November 25 to December 16.

Round 1 November 25, December 1
Masamune | 11:42
Kengo Takai | Pin
Billyken Kid | 24:35
Daisuke Harada | Pin
Tsubasa | 11:46
Hayata | Pin
Zeus | Pin
Orochi | 14:17
Black Buffalo | 12:13
Kuuga | Pin
Tigers Mask | 11:02
Takoyakida | Pin
Hub | Pin
Hideyoshi | 25:12
Tadasuke | Pin
Quiet Storm | 14:25

Round 2 December 2, 8
Kengo Takai | 19:17
Daisuke Harada | Pin
Hayata | Pin
Zeus | 10:23
Kuuga | Pin
Takoyakida | 12:15
Hub | Pin
Tadasuke | 19:03

Semifinals; December 9
Daisuke Harada | Pin
Hayata | 20:22
Kuuga | 16:03
Hub | Pin

Final; December 16
Daisuke Harada | Pin
Hub | 22:30
Third place
Hayata | 12:22
Kuuga | Pin

=== 2013 ===
Tennōzan 2013
- Promotion: Osaka Pro Wrestling
- Date: December 8–23 2013
- City: Osaka, Japan
- Venue: Various; Final: Matsushita IMP Hall

Tennōzan chronology
| ← Previous; 2012 | Next → 2015 |

The 2013 Tennōzan was held from December 8 to December 23.

Round 1 December 8, 14
Churaumi Saver | 13:50
Kazuaki Mihara | Pin
Ultimate Spider Jr. | 14:55
Billyken Kid | Pin
The Bodyguard | Pin
Takoyakida | 14:53
Bull Armor Takuya | 9:44
Black Buffalo | Pin
Tadasuke | 13:12
Alexander Otsuka | Stop
Tigers Mask | Sub
Naoki Setoguchi | 21:25
Tsubasa | Pin
Quiet Storm | 15:13
Zeus | Pin
Mikey Broderick | 11:40

Round 2 December 15, 21
Kazuaki Mihara | Pin
Billyken Kid | 19:30
The Bodyguard | Pin
Black Buffalo | 20:21
Alexander Otsuka | Sub
Tigers Mask | 8:18
Tsubasa | 18:43
Zeus | Pin

Semifinals; December 23
Kazuaki Mihara | 7:10
The Bodyguard | Pin
Alexander Otsuka | 12:21
Zeus | Pin

Final; December 23
The Bodyguard | 20:32
Zeus | Pin

=== 2015 ===
Tennōzan 2015
- Promotion: Osaka Pro Wrestling
- Date: September 21, 2015 – January 31, 2016
- City: Osaka, Japan
- Venue: Various; Final: Osaka Minato Ward Citizen Center

Tennōzan chronology
| ← Previous; 2013 | Next → 2018 |

The 2015 Tennōzan was held from September 21, 2015 to January 31, 2016. The winner of the tournament, Tadasuke, also won the Osaka Pro Wrestling Championship left vacant after OPW went on a hiatus in 2014.

Round 1 September 21 | Round 2 November 21
Magnitude Kishiwada | Pin
Hiroaki Moriya | 10:59
Robbie Wolf | 8:31
Hiroaki Moriya | Sub
Block A
Ebessan | 14:14
Kushikatsu Oyaji | Pin
Kushikatsu Oyaji | 13:59
Tadasuke | Sub
Gamma | 11:12
Tadasuke | Pin
Tsubasa | Pin
Ultimate Spider Jr. | 13:28
Kuishinbo Kamen | 9:29
Ultimate Spider Jr. | Pin
Block B
Caramel Boy | 6:21
Golden Dragon | Pin
Golden Dragon | 8:47
Kaiju New World | Pin
Kaiju New World | Pin
Night Scooper Hiroshi | 7:40

Semifinals; January 31
Magnitude Kishiwada | 12:52
Tadasuke | Pin
Tsubasa | 10:59
Kaiju New World | Pin

Final; January 31
Tadasuke | Pin
Kaiju New World | 15:14

=== 2018 ===
Tennōzan 2018
- Promotion: Osaka Pro Wrestling
- Date: August 18 – November 24, 2018
- City: Osaka, Japan
- Venue: Various; Final: Azalea Taisho Hall

Tennōzan chronology
| ← Previous; 2015 | Next → 2022 |

The 2018 Tennōzan was held from August 18 to November 24, 2018.

Round 1 August 18
Kushikatsu Oyaji | 8:57
Ultimate Spider Jr. | Pin
Kanjyuro Matsuyama | 8:59
Mondai Ryu | CO
Kazuhiro Tamura | 9:57
Hub | Pin
Tsubasa | Sub
Takoyakida | 12:19
Gamma | Pin
Magnitude Kishiwada | 9:57
Shirokuma | 8:59
Takashi Yoshida | Pin

Round 2 October 14
Golden Dragon | 10:29
Ultimate Spider Jr. | Pin
Mondai Ryu | 1:56
Hub | Pin
Tsubasa | Pin
Gamma | 17:13
Takashi Yoshida | 12:08
Caramel Boy | Pin

Semifinals; November 24
Ultimate Spider Jr. | Forfeit
Hub | —
Tsubasa | Pin
Caramel Boy | 6:18

Final; November 24
Ultimate Spider Jr. | 14:24
Tsubasa | Sub

=== 2022 ===
Tennōzan 2022
- Promotion: Osaka Pro Wrestling
- Date: September 25 – October 10, 2022
- City: Osaka, Japan
- Venue: Various; Final: Azalea Taisho Hall

Tennōzan chronology
| ← Previous; 2018 | Next → 2023 |

The 2022 Tennōzan was held from September 25 to October 10, 2022.

Round 1 September 25, October 1
Kazuaki Mihara | Pin
Joichiro Osaka | 11:26
Takoyakida | 13:00
Hub | Pin
Black Buffalo | 17:02
Tigers Mask | Stop
Ebessan III | 5:04
Kuishinbo Kamen | Pin
Quiet Storm | Pin
The Bodyguard | 5:27
Ultimate Spider Jr. | Pin
Tsubasa | 8:24
Ares | 25:33
Yuto Kikuchi | Pin
Toru | Pin
Ryuya Matsufusa | 12:00

Round 2 October 9
Kazuaki Mihara | Pin
Hub | 22:20
Tigers Mask | Sub
Kuishinbo Kamen | 4:32
Quiet Storm | Pin
Ultimate Spider Jr. | 5:56
Yuto Kikuchi | 15:19
Toru | Sub

Semifinals; October 10
Kazuaki Mihara | 12:09
Tigers Mask | Stop
Quiet Storm | 11:53
Toru | Pin

Final; October 10
Tigers Mask | Pin
Toru | 22:28

=== 2023 ===
Tennōzan 2023
- Promotion: Osaka Pro Wrestling
- Date: October 15–29, 2023
- City: Osaka, Japan
- Venue: Various; Final: 176BOX

Tennōzan chronology
| ← Previous; 2022 | Next → 2024 |

The 2023 Tennōzan was held from October 15 to October 29, 2023.

Round 1 October 15, 21
Zeus | Pin
Quiet Storm | 16:28
Goliath | Pin
Ultimate Spider Jr. | 9:26
Shu Asakawa | Pin
Joichiro Osaka | 9:36
Billyken Kid | Pin
Kazuaki Mihara | 15:10
Black Buffalo | 9:06
The Bodyguard | Pin
Takoyakida | 12:53
Toru | Pin
Ryuya Matsufusa | Pin
Tsubasa | 18:16
Aran Sano | Forfeit
Tigers Mask | —

Round 2 October 22
Zeus | Pin
Goliath | 14:42
Shu Asakawa | Pin
Billyken Kid | 10:48
The Bodyguard | 10:37
Toru | Pin
Ryuya Matsufusa | Pin
Aran Sano | 10:01

Semifinals; October 29
Zeus | Pin
Shu Asakawa | 10:55
Toru | Pin
Ryuya Matsufusa | 12:06

Final; October 29
Zeus | Pin
Toru | 21:23

=== 2024 ===
Tennōzan 2024
- Promotion: Osaka Pro Wrestling
- Date: September 8–23, 2024
- City: Osaka, Japan
- Venue: Azalea Taisho Hall

Tennōzan chronology
| ← Previous; 2023 | Next → 2025 |

The 2024 Tennōzan was held from September 8 to September 23, 2024.

Round 1 September 8, 15
Shigehiro Irie | Pin
Goliath | 16:26
Tsubasa | 14:01
Shu Asakawa | Pin
Aran Sano | Pin
Quiet Storm | 9:37
Tigers Mask | CO
Yuto Kikuchi | 21:23
Toru | Pin
Hub | 16:13
Joichiro Osaka | 6:11
Zeus | Pin
Yasutaka Osera | Sub
Billyken Kid | 12:34
Takoyakida | 13:25
Ryuya Matsufusa | Pin

Round 2 September 22
Shigehiro Irie | Stop
Shu Asakawa | 12:55
Aran Sano | 12:25
Tigers Mask | Sub
Toru | Pin
Zeus | 26:20
Yasutaka Osera | Pin
Ryuya Matsufusa | 13:13

Semifinals; September 23
Shigehiro Irie | Sub
Tigers Mask | 11:04
Toru | Pin
Yasutaka Osera | 7:50

Final; September 23
Shigehiro Irie | 23:59
Toru | Pin

=== 2025 ===
Tennōzan 2025
- Promotion: Osaka Pro Wrestling
- Date: September 13–28, 2025
- City: Osaka, Japan
- Venue: Azalea Taisho Hall

Tennōzan chronology
| ← Previous; 2024 | Next → 2026 |

The 2025 Tennōzan was held from September 13 to September 28, 2025.

Round 1 September 13, 14
Ultimate Spider Jr. | Pin
Tiiida | 13:21
Shu Asakawa | 13:26
Quiet Storm | Pin
Kazuaki Mihara | Sub
Shigehiro Irie | 21:09
Aran Sano | Pin
Goliath | 10:51
Ryuya Matsufusa | Sub
Tigers Mask | 19:18
Motonobu Tezuka | Sub
Takoyakida | 11:41

Round 2 September 21
Yasutaka Osera | 10:33
Ultimate Spider Jr. | Pin
Quiet Storm | 12:31
Kazuaki Mihara | Sub
Aran Sano | 23:43
Ryuya Matsufusa | Sub
Motonobu Tezuka | 10:38
Toru | Pin

Semifinals; September 28
Ultimate Spider Jr. | 13:16
Kazuaki Mihara | Pin
Ryuya Matsufusa | Pin
Toru | 10:34

Final; September 28
Kazuaki Mihara | 22:50
Ryuya Matsufusa | Sub

=== 2026 ===
Tennōzan 2026
- Promotion: Osaka Pro Wrestling
- Date: September 5–23, 2026
- City: Various; Final: Osaka, Japan
- Venue: Various; Final: Azalea Taisho Hall

Tennōzan chronology
| ← Previous; 2025 | Next → — |

The 2026 Tennōzan was held from September 5 to September 23, 2026.

Round 1 September 5, 13
Aran Sano | Pin
Sho Mizuno | 17:00
Kohei Kinoshita | 9:44
Suzaku | Pin
Goliath | 9:28
Van Vert Jack | Pin
Tiiida | 18:08
Toru | Pin
Tigers Mask | 12:37
Kazuaki Mihara | Pin
Ryuya Matsufusa | Pin
Takoyakida | 23:44
Hub | 10:41
Shu Asakawa | Pin
Kuukai | Sub
Ultimate Spider Jr. | 11:31

Round 2 September 22
Aran Sano | Pin
Suzaku | 11:40
Vent Vert Jack | 15:45
Toru | Pin
Kazuaki Mihara | Pin
Ryuya Matsufusa | 19:16
Shu Asakawa | 8:53
Kuukai | Pin

Semifinals; September 23
Aran Sano | Pin
Toru | 11:04
Kazuaki Mihara | Pin
Kuukai | 10:01

Final; September 23
Aran Sano | 17:24
Kazuaki Mihara | Pin

== See also ==
- Osaka Pro Wrestling
- New Japan Cup
- Ōdō Tournament
- King of DDT Tournament
- Wrestle-1 Grand Prix
- Ryūkon Cup
