= Ultimate Spider Jr. =

Japanese wrestler (born 1984)

- Ultimate Spider Jr. in September 2015

Personal information
- Born: 18 March 1984 (age 42) Osaka, Japan

Professional wrestling career
- Ring name: Beetle RX Captain Zack Churaumi Pirate Kabuto Soldier Robert Tanaka Spider Ant Spider J Ultimate Spider Jr.
- Billed height: 175 cm (5 ft 9 in)
- Billed weight: 80 kg (176 lb)
- Trained by: Tigers Mask; Tsubasa
- Debut: 2006

Ultimate Spider Jr. (アルティメット・スパイダーJr., Arutimetto supaidā junia) is a masked Japanese professional wrestler best known for his tenure with Osaka Pro Wrestling (OPW). He also works as a freelancer for various promotions of the Japanese independent scene.

== Professional wrestling career ==
=== Osaka Pro Wrestling (2006–present) ===
Ultimate Spider Jr. made his professional wrestling debut in Osaka Pro Wrestling on the third night of the 2006 Tennozan Tournament, having competed outside of the main tournament under the name of "Robert Tanaka" in a losing effort against Super Delfin. During his time with the promotion, he competed for various accomplishments. He is a former three-time Osaka Tag Team Champion, titles which he has held only alongside Takoyakida as "Takosupa", and having won them for the first time at It's Osaka Pro Everyone Gather! on October 8, 2017. Ultimate Spider Jr. won the Osaka Light Heavyweight Championship at Excalibur 2025 on December 7, by defeating Yasutaka Oosera.

He competed in several of the promotion's signature events. In the Tennōzan tournament, he made his first appearance at the 2010 edition where he fell short to Kanjyuro Matsuyama in the first rounds. He scored his best result at the 2018 edition where he defeated Kushikatsu Oyaji in the first rounds, Golden Dragon in the second, Hub in the semifinals, then fell short to Tsubasa in the finals.

=== Japanese independent circuit (2007–present) ===
Ultimate Spider Jr. competed in various promotions of the Japanese independent scene as an OPW talent. At NJPW Exciting Battle In Okinawa 2009, an event promoted by New Japan Pro Wrestling on March 29, 2009, he teamed up with Mil Mongoose and Shisaou to defeat Kaijin Habu Otoko, Menso-re Oyaji and Super Delfin. On the seventh night of All Japan Pro Wrestling's Real World Tag League from December 2, 2017, he teamed up with Takoyakida outside of the main tournament, in a losing effort against Nextream (Naoya Nomura and Yuma Aoyagi). At BJW Osaka Surprise 52, an event promoted by Big Japan Pro Wrestling on July 4, 2021, he teamed up with Andy Wu and Hub and defeated Viva México Cabrones (Billyken Kid, Masamune, and Tsubasa) to win the UWA World Trios Championship.

== Championships and accomplishments ==
- Big Japan Pro Wrestling
  - UWA World Trios Championship (1 time) – with Andy Wu and Hub
- Dotonbori Pro Wrestling
  - WDW Tag Team Championship (1 time) – with Captain Amemura
- Japan Pro Wrestling 2000
  - JWF Tag Team Championship (1 time) – with Takoyakida
- Osaka Pro Wrestling
  - Osaka Light Heavyweight Championship (1 times)
  - Osaka Pro Wrestling Battle Royal Championship (1 time)
  - Osaka Tag Team Championship (3 times) – with Takoyakida
  - Osaka Pro Light Heavyweight Tournament (2023)
