= Naohiro Hoshikawa =

Personal information
- Born: December 13, 1974 (age 51) Shigeru, Kanagawa, Japan

Professional wrestling career
- Ring name(s): Hoshikawa; Ichiro Ryusei; Naohiro Hoshikawa
- Billed height: 173 cm (5 ft 8 in)
- Billed weight: 90 kg (198 lb)
- Trained by: Michinoku Pro Wrestling
- Debut: July 26, 1993
- Retired: October 17, 2004

Naohiro Hoshikawa (星川尚浩, Hoshikawa Naohiro; born December 13, 1974) is a retired Japanese professional wrestler. Hoshikawa competed extensively in Michinoku Pro Wrestling, Osaka Pro Wrestling and Pro Wrestling Zero1 until he was forced to retire after suffering a career-ending brain injury in 2004. Hoshikawa also competed in All Japan Pro Wrestling, Big Japan Pro Wrestling, Pro Wrestling Noah and Battlarts.

== Professional wrestling career ==
=== Michinoku Pro Wrestling (1993–1999) ===
Hoshikawa was trained by Michinoku Pro Wrestling and debuted on July 26, 1993, losing to Wellington Wilkins, Jr. Hoshikawa competed almost exclusively in losing efforts throughout the early years of his career, wrestling the likes of Wilkins, Terry Boy, Sato, and Taka Michinoku. On August 11, 1996, Hoshikawa received the first championship opportunity of his career, unsuccessfully challenging Taka Michinoku for the FMW Independent Heavyweight Championship. One week later on August 17, he competed against El Pantera in a losing effort for the vacant WWA Middleweight Championship. On October 10, he competed against Johnny Saint in a special World Of Sport rules match, which he lost in the 4th round. On September 14, 1997, he unsuccessfully challenged Minoru Tanaka for the UWA World Middleweight Championship.

=== Osaka Pro Wrestling (1999–2001) ===
After 5 years in Michinoku Pro, Hoshikawa left the promotion in 1999 and signed with Osaka Pro Wrestling in April 1999. In July of the same year, he teamed with Masato Yakushiji to capture the CMLL Japan Tag Tag Team Championship, the first title of his career. On February 20, 2000, they made their first successful defence of the championships, defeating Ebessan and Kuishinbo Kamen. They once again defended the titles against Policeman and Daio Quallt on March 23. On October 15, he defeated Super Delfin in the final to win the 2000 Tennozan Tournament.

=== Pro Wrestling Zero-One (2001–2004) ===
After a short absence from professional wrestling, Hoshikawa left Osaka Pro in early 2001, signing with Pro Wrestling Zero1. In his debut on match on March 2, 2001, he lost to Naomichi Marufuji. On August 26, he debuted in Pro Wrestling Noah, teaming with Tatsuhito Takaiwa to defeat Makoto Hashi and Yoshinobu Kanemaru. On September 1, he faced Takaiwa for the first time, the first match of many between the two. On December 7, Hoshikawa competed in his last match in NOAH, teaming with Takaiwa in a loss to Takeshi Morishima and Takeshi Rikio. On December 15, he made his debut in the United States for NWA East / Pro Wrestling eXpress, unsuccessfully challenging Paul Atlas for the PWL Triple Jeopardy Championship in a triple threat match also involving Nikita Allanov. On June 30, 2002, he unsuccessfully challenged Leonardo Spanky for the International Junior Heavyweight Championship. On October 26, he challenged for the championship once again, this time losing against Low-Ki. Throughout November and December 2002, he competed in the 2002 Tenkaichi Junior Tournament, making it to the final where he lost to Wataru Sakata. On August 27, 2003, he once again unsuccessfully challenged Low-Ki for the Junior Heavyweight Championship. In December 2003, he teamed with Takaiwa in a tournament to crown the new NWA International Lightweight Tag Team Champions. They made it to the final, where they lost to Ikuto Hidaka and Dick Togo. In April 2004, he once again took part in the Tenkaichi Junior Tournament, finishing with 2 points and failing to advance to the final. On May 15, he teamed with Jun Kasai to unsuccessfully challenge Tommy Wilson and Tony Stradlin for the UPW Lightweight Heavyweight Tag Team Championship.

=== Injury and retirement ===
On October 17, 2004, he faced Takaiwa in a cage death match for the International Junior Heavyweight Title in what would be the last match of his career. After taking a powerbomb from the top of the cage and then a clothesline, the referee noticed that Hoshikawa had become completely unresponsive and had begun snoring. The match was immediately brought to an end, and Hoshikawa was transported to hospital where doctors frantically tried to stop the bleeding in his brain. He fell into a month-long coma, but finally awoke in November 2004. Upon awaking, doctors scanned his brain and determined that although he had survived, he had sustained severe brain damage and would likely use a wheelchair for the rest of his life. The cause for the injury was not solely due to injuries suffered in the cage match, but multiple concussions that went untreated in weeks prior to it as well. Due to obvious reasons, Hoshikawa announced his retirement from professional wrestling shortly after. Since retiring, Hoshikawa has managed to regain the ability to stand, albeit with the aid of a crutch. He made a one-off return to professional wrestling on July 17, 2013 for the 20th Anniversary of his debut, where he defeated Naomichi Marufuji in less than a minute.

== Other media ==
In 1998, Hoshikawa appeared on the Japanese television show Sasuke, where he failed the Rapid Descent/Maruta Kudari in the First Stage.

Hoshikawa appears as a playable character in 4 video games, including Fire Pro Wrestling 2, King Of Colosseum Green, King Of Colosseum 2, and Fire Pro Wrestling Returns.

== Championships and accomplishments ==
- Osaka Pro Wrestling
  - CMLL Japan Tag Team Championship (one time) – with Masato Yakushiji
  - Tennōzan (2000)
- Pro Wrestling Illustrated
  - PWI ranked him #194 of the top 500 singles wrestlers in the PWI 500 in 2000
