= Takoyakida =

Japanese professional wrestler

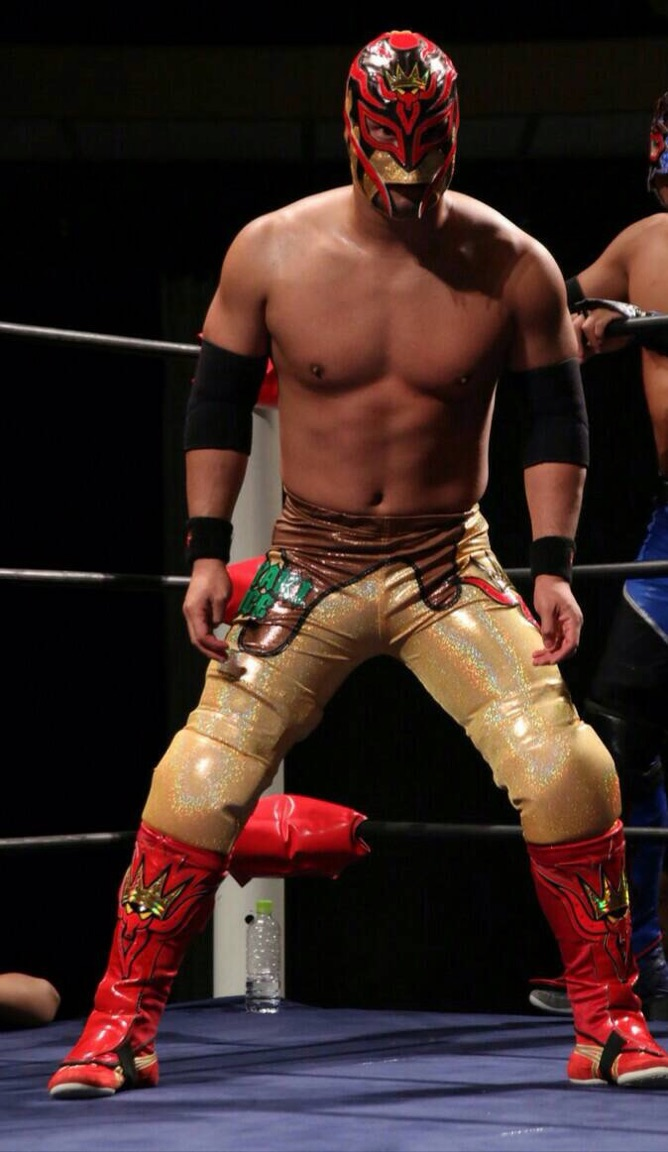
- Takoyakida in April 2016

Personal information
- Born: January 18, 1986 (age 40) Takarazuka, Japan

Professional wrestling career
- Ring name(s): Takoyaki Daio; Prince Tako; Takoyakida
- Billed height: 168 cm (5 ft 6 in)
- Billed weight: 80 kg (176 lb)
- Trained by: Tigers Mask
- Debut: 2005

Takoyakida (タコヤキーダー, Takoyakīdā) is a Japanese professional wrestler currently working as a freelancer and is best known for his time in the Japanese promotion Osaka Pro Wrestling. A masked wrestler, Takoyakida is greatly influenced by lucha libre, and because of this, he has followed Mexican tradition for masked wrestlers, so his real name is not a matter of public record.

== Professional wrestling career ==
=== Independent circuit (2005–present) ===
As a freelancer, Takoyakida is known for competing in various promotions. At Shiny Navigation 2013 Ark New Chapter, an event promoted by Pro Wrestling Noah on September 19, 2013, he fell short to Taiji Ishimori. At FREEDOMS Osaka & Miyakojima, an event promoted by Pro Wrestling Freedoms on March 24, 2019, Takoyakida teamed up with Ultimate Spider Jr. and Idea to pick up a victory over Dyna Mido Gentaro and Takashi Sasaki. At BJW BJ-Style #25, an event promoted by Big Japan Pro Wrestling on March 22, 2020, he teamed up with Kazuki Hashimoto and Yuya Aoki to defeat Kosuke Sato, Kota Sekifuda and Tida Heat.

==== All Japan Pro Wrestling (2016–2020) ====
Takoyakida spent a few years sporadically working for All Japan Pro Wrestling. At AJPW Summer Action Series 2017 on July 30 he teamed up with Minoru Tanaka and Ultimate Spider Jr. to defeat Atsushi Maruyama, Último Dragón and Yusuke Okada. At AJPW Excite Series 2018 on February 25, he teamed up with Jun Akiyama, Kai and Yohei Nakajima in a losing effort to Mineo Fujita, Naoya Nomura, Ryouji Sai and Shoichi Uchida. At AJPW Super Power Series 2018 on June 3, he teamed up with The Bodyguard and Zeus in a losing effort to Kento Miyahara, Naoya Nomura and Yoshitatsu as a result of a six-man tag team match.

==== Osaka Pro Wrestling (2005–present) ====
Takoyakida made his professional wrestling debut at Osaka Pro Story #30, an event promoted by Osaka Pro Wrestling on December 3, 2005, where he fell short to his own coach, Tigers Mask. He is best known for competing in the company since his debut.

He worked in one of the promotion's signature events, the Osaka Hurricane, making his first appearance at the 2006 edition from February 26 where he competed in an Eight-way elimination match for the Osaka Meibutsu Sekaiichi Championship won by Mr. Okita and also involving Policeman, Azteca, Ebessan, Ice Penguin, Kuishinbo Kamen and Monkey Magic III. At the 2008 edition, he teamed up with Daisuke Harada, picking up a victory over Robert Tanaka and Tadasuke.

== Championships and accomplishments ==
- DDT Pro-Wrestling

- Ironman Heavymetalweight Championship (1 time)
- UWA World Trios Championship (1 time) – with Atsushi Kotoge and Daisuke Harada

- Osaka Pro Wrestling
  - Osaka Meibutsu Sekaiichi Championship (1 time, current)
  - Osaka Pro Wrestling Battle Royal Championship (1 time)
  - Osaka Owarai Championship (1 time)
  - Osaka Tag Team Championship (3 times) – with Ultimate Spider Jr.
