= Osaka Meibutsu Sekaiichi Championship =

Professional wrestling championship

Details
- Promotion: Osaka Pro Wrestling
- Date established: January 4, 2000
- Current champion: Tigers Mask
- Date won: July 20, 2026

Other name
- Osaka World's Best Attraction Championship
Statistics
- First champion: Kuishinbo Kamen
- Most reigns: Kuishinbo Kamen (6 times)
- Longest reign: Kuishinbo Kamen (1,124 days)
- Shortest reign: Kanjyuro Matsuyama (<1 day)
- Oldest champion: Ebessan III (55 years, 193 days)
- Youngest champion: Okita-kun (21 years, 350 days)

The Osaka Meibutsu Sekaiichi Championship (大阪名物世界一王座, Ōsaka Meibutsu Sekaiichi Ōza; lit. Osaka World's No. 1 Attraction Championship) is a secondary professional wrestling title contested in the Japanese promotion Osaka Pro Wrestling. The title was established in 2000 when Kuishinbo Kamen defeated Ebessan to win the championship.

The title is currently held by Tigers Mask.

== Title history ==
Key
No.	Overall reign number
Reign	Reign number for the specific champion
Days	Number of days held
†	Championship change is unrecognized by the promotion
<1	Reign lasted less than a day
+	Current reign is changing daily

No.	Champion	Championship change			Reign statistics		Notes	Ref.
No.	Champion	Date	Event	Location	Reign	Days	Notes	Ref.
Osaka Pro Wrestling (OPW)
1	Kuishinbo Kamen	January 4, 2000	Osaka Pro Story	Osaka, Japan	1	1,124	Kamen defeated Ebessan to become the first champion.	
2	Ebessan	February 1, 2003	Osaka Hurricane 03.2.1	Osaka, Japan	1	56	This was a Character Deprivation Best-Two-Out-of-Three Falls match.	
3	Perro	March 29, 2003	Saturday Night Story	Osaka, Japan	1	7	Ebessan was relegated to World's No. 5.	
4	Ebessan	April 5, 2003	Saturday Night Story: Story Must Go On!!	Osaka, Japan	2	92	Perro was relegated to World's No. 5.	
5	Tigers Mask	July 6, 2003	Osaka Pro Story #18	Osaka, Japan	1	90	Ebessan was relegated to World's No. 4.	
—	Vacated	October 4, 2003	—	—	—	—	Tigers Mask vacated the title to enter the 2003 Tennōzan tournament.	
6	Miracleman	December 7, 2003	Osaka Holiday Paradise	Osaka, Japan	1	55	Defeated Ebessan (relegated to World's No. 5), Kuishinbo Kamen (relegated to No. 2), and Perro (relegated to No. 3) in a four-way match to win the vacant title. Tortuga was relegated to No. 4.	
7	Ebessan	January 31, 2004	Saturday Night Story	Osaka, Japan	3	21	This was a three-way match also involving Kuishinbo Kamen. Miracleman was relegated to World's No. 5.	
8	Kuishinbo Kamen	February 21, 2004	Super J-Cup 4th Stage: Osaka Hurricane 2004	Osaka, Japan	2	665		
—	Vacated	December 17, 2005	Saturday Night Story	Osaka, Japan	—	—	Kuishinbo Kamen was stripped of the title due to a lack of title defenses.	
9	Okita-kun	February 26, 2006	Osaka Hurricane 2006: Starting Point Revolution	Osaka, Japan	1	314	Okita-kun won an eight-man battle royal to win the vacant title. The match also involved Policeman, Azteca, Ebessan, Ice Penguin, Kuishinbo Kamen, Takoyakida and Monkey Magic III.	
—	Vacated	January 6, 2007	Saturday Night Story	Osaka, Japan	—	—	Okita-hun vacated the title due to an ear injury sustained on September 16, 2006.	
10	Sgt. Suchi	February 12, 2007	Osaka Hurricane 2007	Osaka, Japan	1	194	Sgt. Suchi is a comedian who won a battle royal, last eliminating Miracleman and Kuishinbo Kamen, to win the vacant title.	
11	Ebessan III	August 25, 2007	Saturday Night Story	Osaka, Japan	1	113	This was a battle royal also involving Takaku Fuke, Kuishinbo Kamen, Kanjyuro Matsuyama, Tokoyakida and Miracleman.	
12	Kuishinbo Kamen	December 16, 2007	Osaka Pro Tokyo Story #7	Tokyo, Japan	3	84	This was a best two-out-of-three falls match.	
13	Miracleman	March 9, 2008	Osaka Pro Tokyo Story #8	Tokyo, Japan	2	51		
14	Kanjyuro Matsuyama	April 29, 2008	Osaka Pro Story #41: Osaka Pro 9th Anniversary	Tokyo, Japan	1	<1		
—	Deactivated	April 29, 2008	Osaka Pro Story #41: Osaka Pro 9th Anniversary	Tokyo, Japan	—	—	Matsuyama retired the title immediately after the match and declared himself the first Osaka Pro Wrestling Owarai Champion.	
15	Kuishinbo Kamen	April 29, 2010	Osaka Pro 11th Anniversary: Heartfelt Thanks	Osaka, Japan	4	59	Defeated Kikutaro for both his Osaka Pro Wrestling Owarai Championship and the reactivated Osaka Meibutsu Sekaiichi Championship.	
16	Kyusei Ninja Ranmaru	June 27, 2010	Osaka Tag Festival 2010	Osaka, Japan	1	22	This match was also for Kuishinbo Kamen's Osaka Pro Wrestling Owarai Championship. Ranmaru was the first woman to win the titles.	
17	Kuishinbo Kamen	July 19, 2010	Summer Action Series #8	Osaka, Japan	5	11	This match was also for Kyusei Ninja Ranmaru's Osaka Pro Wrestling Owarai Championship.	
—	Deactivated	July 30, 2010	Hito no Tsunagari 2010	Osaka, Japan	—	—	Kuishinbo Kamen successfully defended the title and then retired it.	
†	Ebessan	April 29, 2014	Osaka Pro 15th Anniversary Show	Osaka, Japan	—	—	Defeated Kuishinbo Kamen in a match billed as the Osaka Meibutsu Sekaiichi 2014 Championship match. No belt was awarded.	
†	Ebessan	November 24, 2014	Tsubasa 20th Anniversary Show: When There's a Will, There's a Way	Izumi, Japan	—	—	Defeated Kuishinbo Kamen at an independently produced event to win the vacant title. No belt was awarded and the title was abandonned once again.	
—	Joichiro Osaka	May 21, 2023	Osaka Castle Festival	Osaka, Japan	—	<1	The title was revived to replace the Osaka Owarai Championship and Joichiro Osaka was declared the interim champion.	
18	Kuishinbo Kamen	May 21, 2023	Osaka Castle Festival	Osaka, Japan	6	203	Kuishinbo Kamen then defeated Joichiro Osaka and Kanjyuro Matsuyama in a three-way match to win the revived title.	
19	Joichiro Osaka	December 10, 2023	Excalibur	Osaka, Japan	1	258	This was a five-way match also involving Ebessan III, Kikutaro and Kyusei Ninja Ranmaru.	
20	Kanjyuro Matsuyama	August 24, 2024	Osaka Pro Summer Festival 2024 Day 1	Osaka, Japan	2	127		
21	Joichiro Osaka	December 29, 2024	Excalibur 2024	Osaka, Japan	2	168		
22	Ebessan III	June 15, 2025	Osaka Castle Festival 2025	Osaka, Japan	2	175		
23	Takoyakida	December 7, 2025	Excalibur 2025	Osaka, Japan	1	91	This was a three-way match also involving Billy Ken Kid.	
24	Kanjyuro Matsuyama	March 8, 2026	Bushi-Do 2026: Opening Day	Osaka, Japan	3	14		
25	Takoyakida	March 22, 2026	Bushi-Do 2026	Osaka, Japan	2	35	This was a four-way match also involving Kuishinbo Kamen and Joichiro Osaka.	
26	Joichiro Osaka	April 26, 2026	Osaka Pro 27th Anniversary	Toyonaka, Japan	3	85	This was a four-way match also involving Kuishinbo Kamen and Tigers Mask.	
27	Tigers Mask	July 20, 2026	Osaka Pro Osaka Castle Town Festival 2026	Osaka, Japan	2	47+	This was a three-way match also involving Ebessan III.	

== Combined reigns ==
As of September 5, 2026.

†	Indicates the current champion

Rank	Champion	No. of reigns	Combined days
1	Kuishinbo Kamen	6	2,146
2	Joichiro Osaka	3	511
3	Okita-kun	1	314
4	Ebessan III	2	288
5	Sgt. Suchi	1	194
6	Ebessan	3	169
7	Kanjyuro Matsuyama	3	141
8	Tigers Mask †	2	137+
9	Takoyakida	2	126
10	Miracleman	2	106
11	Kyusei Ninja Ranmaru	1	22
12	Perro	1	7
