= Osaka Owarai Championship =

Professional wrestling championship

Details
- Promotion: Osaka Pro Wrestling
- Date established: April 29, 2008
- Date retired: January 8, 2023

Other name
- Osaka Pro Wrestling Owarai Championship (2008–2019)
Statistics
- First champion: Kanjyuro Matsuyama
- Final champion: Billyken Kid
- Most reigns: Kanjyuro Matsuyama] (4 times)
- Longest reign: Billyken Kid (1,050 days)
- Shortest reign: Otoko Sakari (3 days)

The Osaka Owarai Championship (Japanese: 大阪お笑い王座, Hepburn: Ōsaka Owarai Ōza) was the secondary title contested in the Japanese professional wrestling promotion Osaka Pro Wrestling. It was established in 2008 as the Osaka Pro Wrestling Owarai Championship (before being renamed in 2019) when Kanjyuro Matsuyama declared himself the first Owarai Champion upon vacating the Osaka Meibutsu Sekaiichi Championship.

Being a professional wrestling championship, it was not won via direct competition; it was instead won via a predetermined ending to a match or awarded to a wrestler because of a wrestling angle.

== History ==
=== Names ===
Name	Years
Osaka Pro Wrestling Owarai Championship	April 29, 2008 – February 16, 2019
Osaka Owarai Championship	February 16, 2019 – January 8, 2023

=== Reigns ===
During the championship's existence, there have been 23 recognized reigns shared among 14 wrestlers with three vacancies. Kanjyuro Matsuyama was the inaugural champion. He also has the most reigns with four. Billyken Kid holds the record for the longest in the title's history at 1,050 days during his sole reign, but Kikutaro (who also held the title as the third incarnation of Ebessan) has the longest combined reign at 1,054 days. Billyken Kid was the final recognized champion.

Key
No.	Overall reign number
Reign	Reign number for the specific champion
Days	Number of days held
Defenses	Number of successful defenses
N/A	Unknown information

No.	Champion	Championship change			Reign statistics			Notes	Ref.
No.	Champion	Date	Event	Location	Reign	Days	Defenses	Notes	Ref.
Osaka Pro Wrestling (OPW)
1	Kanjyuro Matsuyama	April 29, 2008	Osaka Pro 9th Anniversary Show	Osaka, Japan	1	333	7	Matsuyama declared himself the inaugural champion after having defeated Miracle Man for the Osaka Meibutsu Sekaiichi Championship which he retired immediately afterwards.	
2	Kikutaro	March 28, 2009	Saturday Night Story	Osaka, Japan	1	397	3		
3	Kuishinbo Kamen	April 29, 2010	Osaka Pro 11th Anniversary Show	Osaka, Japan	1	59	1	This match was also for the vacant Osaka Meibutsu Sekaiichi Championship.	
4	Kyusei Ninja Ranmaru	June 27, 2010	Osaka Tag Festival 2010	Osaka, Japan	1	22	1	This match was also for Kuishinbo Kamen's Osaka Meibutsu Sekaiichi Championship.	
5	Kuishinbo Kamen	July 19, 2010	Summer Achoo Series	Osaka, Japan	2	40	1	This match was also for Kyusei Ninja Ranmaru's Osaka Meibutsu Sekaiichi Championship.	
6	Miracle Man	August 28, 2010	Summer Achoo Series	Osaka, Japan	1	13	0		
—	Vacated	September 10, 2010	—	—	—	—	—	Miracle Man vacated the title in order to focus on defending the Osaka Pro Wrestling Tag Team Championship.	
7	Kanjyuro Matsuyama	September 18, 2010	Violet September Series	Osaka, Japan	2	23	0	Defeated Kuishinbo Kamen, Takaku Fuke and Takoyakida in a four-way match to win the vacant title.	
8	Takoyakida	October 11, 2010	Battle Autumn 2010	Osaka, Japan	1	40	1	This was a five-way match also involving Kuishinbo Kamen, Kyusei Ninja Ranmaru and Miracle Man.	
9	Otoko Sakari	November 20, 2010	Fuyu ga Hajimaru yo Series	Osaka, Japan	1	3	0	This was a three-way match also involving Kanjyuro Matsuyama.	
10	Kanjyuro Matsuyama	November 23, 2010	Osaka Pro in Nagoya	Nagoya, Japan	3	406	5	Matsuyama won the title by forfeit when Otoko Sakari failed to appear for the match.	
11	Ebessan (III)	January 3, 2012	New Year Osaka Holiday Paradise	Osaka, Japan	1	403	3		
12	Orochi	February 9, 2013	Saturday Night Story	Osaka, Japan	1	15	0		
13	Ebessan (III)	February 24, 2013	Osaka Holiday Paradise	Osaka, Japan	2	147	0		
14	Mr. #6	July 21, 2013	Osaka Pro-Wrestling Story	Osaka, Japan	1	35	0		
15	Tigers Mask	August 25, 2013	Osaka Tornado	Osaka, Japan	1	69	2	This was a three-way match also involving Nise Grandpa Mask.	
16	Hof Senyo Zeong	November 2, 2013	Saturday Night Story	Osaka, Japan	1	14	0		
17	Tigers Mask	November 16, 2013	Saturday Night Story	Osaka, Japan	2	155	0		
—	Vacated	April 20, 2014	—	—	—	—	—	Title vacated due to Tigers Mask leaving Osaka Pro.	
18	Ebessan (I)	July 12, 2014	House show	Osaka, Japan	2	657	1	Defeated Kuishinbo Kamen to win the vacant title. Previously held the title under the name Kikutaro.	
19	Kuishinbo Kamen	April 29, 2016	Osaka Pro Raising an Army 17th Anniversary Show	Osaka, Japan	3	93	0		
20	Shiro Kuma	July 31, 2016	Osaka Pro ga Yattekita! in Konohana	Osaka, Japan	1	N/A (Note: The date of at least one of the title changes in this reign is uncertain, which means that the reign lasted between 1 and 973 days.)	3		
—	Vacated	N/A	—	—	—	—	—	Title vacated due to unknown circumstances. The championship was renamed Osaka Owarai Championship on February 16, 2019.	
21	Kanjyuro Matsuyama	March 31, 2019	Osaka Pro no Kaika Sengen 2019	Osaka, Japan	4	31	0	Defeated Miracle Man to win the vacant title.	
22	Miracle Man	May 1, 2019	Osaka Pro 20th Anniversary Show	Osaka, Japan	2	298	0		
23	Billyken Kid	February 23, 2020	Hero Battle Show 2020	Tokyo, Japan	1	1,050	0	This was also for Billyken Kid's Fukumen World Championship. This was an Osaka Style Wrestling event.	
†	Joichiro Osaka	January 8, 2023	Osaka Pro New Year Special 2023	Osaka, Japan	—	<1	0	Won a battle royal to win the championship. The title change was voided when Billyken Kid confessed he had lost the physical title belt prior to the match.	
—	Deactivated	January 8, 2023	Osaka Pro New Year Special 2023	Osaka, Japan	—	—	—	Zeus decided to retire the title and revive the Osaka Meibutsu Sekaiichi Championship instead.	

== Combined reigns ==
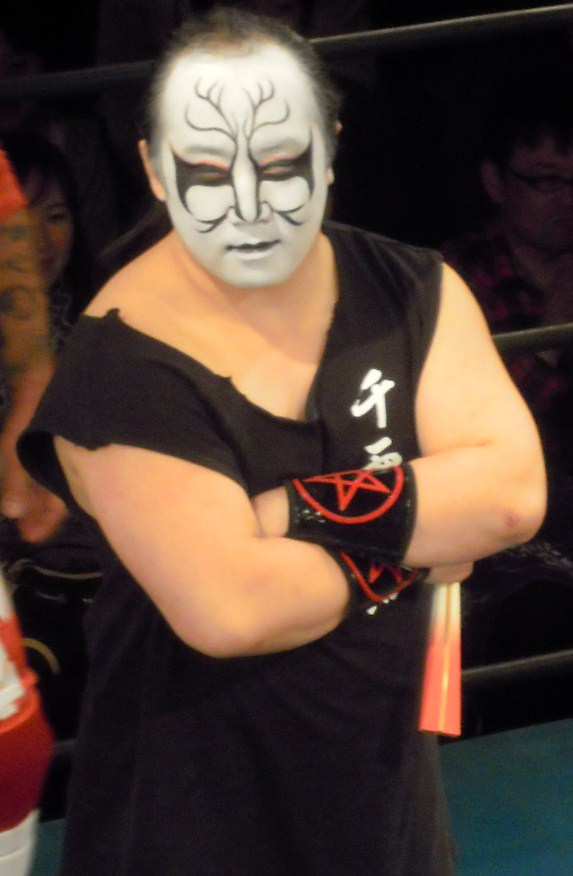
Record four-time champion, Kanjyuro Matsuyama.

¤	The exact length of at least one title reign is uncertain, so the shortest possible length is used.

Rank	Wrestler	No. of reigns	Combined defenses	Combined days
1	Kikutaro/Ebessan (I)	2	4	1,054
2	Billyken Kid	1	0	1,050
3	Kanjyuro Matsuyama	4	12	793
4	Ebessan (III)	2	3	550
5	Miracle Man	2	0	311
6	Tigers Mask	2	2	224
7	Kuishinbo Kamen	3	2	192
8	Takoyakida	1	1	40
9	Mr. #6	1	0	35
10	Kyusei Ninja Ranmaru	1	1	22
11	Orochi	1	0	15
12	Hof Senyo Zeong	1	0	14
13	Otoko Sakari	1	0	3
14	Shiro Kuma	1	3	N/A¤
—	Joichiro Osaka	—	0	<1
