= Tenpohzan Grand Prix Championship =

Professional wrestling championship

Details
- Promotion: Osaka Pro Wrestling
- Date established: March 24, 2001
- Date retired: April 30, 2013
Statistics
- First champion: Miracle Man
- Final champion: Miracle Man
- Most reigns: Miracle Man (2 times)
- Longest reign: Miracle Man (588 days)
- Shortest reign: Billyken Kid (91 days)

The Tenpohzan Grand Prix Championship is a title contested in the Japanese pro wrestling promotion Osaka Pro Wrestling. The title was established when Miracle Man became the first champion.

Being a professional wrestling championship, it is not won via direct competition; it is instead won via a predetermined ending to a match or awarded to a wrestler because of a wrestling angle. There have been three reigns by three wrestlers with one vacancies. The vacancy came when Miracle Man didn't defend the title.

== Title history ==
As of September 19, 2026

#	Order in reign history
Reign	The reign number for the specific set of wrestlers listed
—	Used for vacated reigns so as not to count it as an official reign
N/A	The information is not available or is unknown
+	Indicates the current reign is changing daily

#	Wrestlers	Reign	Date	Days held	Location	Notes	Ref
Osaka Pro Wrestling (OPW)
1	Miracle Man	1	March 29, 2009	560	Osaka, Japan	Miracle Man defeated El Samurai and Kuishimbo Kamen to become the first champion.	
—	Vacant	—	October 10, 2010	—	Osaka, Japan	Miracle Man vacated the title for not defending it.	
2	Billyken Kid	1	October 27, 2010	91	Osaka, Japan	Billyken Kid defeated Great Kaiser in the finals of a six man tournament. The first round are three way matches. The final is a karaoke singing contest with the audience as the judges.	
3	Takoyakida	1	January 26, 2011	300	Osaka, Japan	Takoyakida pins Naoshi Sano in a four way match also involving Billyken Kid and Kuishimbo Kamen.	
4	Miracle Man	2	November 22, 2011	541	Osaka, Japan		
—	Vacant	—	April 30, 2013	—	Osaka, Japan	Vacated when Miracle Man left Osaka Pro Wrestling.	

== List of combined reigns ==
As of September 19, 2026

Rank	Team	# Of Reigns	Combined Days
1.	Miracle Man	2	1113
2.	Takoyakida	1	300
3.	Billyken Kid	1	91
