= IMGP World Heavyweight Championship =

Professional wrestling championship

Details
- Promotion: DDT Pro-Wrestling
- Date established: 2006
- Current champion: Atsushi Maruyama
- Date won: July 12, 2015
Statistics
- First champion: Danshoku Dino
- Most reigns: Atsushi Maruyama (2 reigns)
- Longest reign: Atsushi Maruyama (4,009+ days)
- Shortest reign: Danshoku Dino (96 days)
- Oldest champion: Atsushi Maruyama (39 years, 41 days)
- Youngest champion: Kota Ibushi (25 years, 108 days)

The IMGP World Heavyweight Championship (Japanese: IMGP世界ヘビー級王座, Hepburn: IMGP Sekai Hebī-kyū Ōza) is an inactive professional wrestling championship in the Japanese promotion Muscle (マッスル, Massuru), a sub-brand of DDT Pro-Wrestling. IMGP is the acronym of International Muscle Grand Prix and a parody of New Japan Pro-Wrestling's governing body, the International Wrestling Grand Prix.

The championship was introduced in late 2006 and has been represented by a belt resembling the second IWGP Heavyweight Championship design. Since Atsushi Maruyama won the title in 2015, it has never been defended nor has it been officially deactivated.

== History ==
Key
No.	Overall reign number
Reign	Reign number for the specific champion
Days	Number of days held
Defenses	Number of successful defenses
N/A	Unknown information
+	Current reign is changing daily

No.	Champion	Championship change			Reign statistics			Notes	Ref.
No.	Champion	Date	Event	Location	Reign	Days	Defenses	Notes	Ref.
1	Danshoku Dino	September 29, 2006	Muscle 11	Tokyo, Japan	1	96	0	Defeated Antonio Honda and Seiya Morohashi in a three-way match to win the inaugural title.	
2	Lee Nikkan	January 3, 2007	Muscle House 3	Tokyo, Japan	1	121	0	First woman to win the title. Ryuji Ito was the scheduled opponent for Danshoku Dino. However, his wife Lee Nikkan (who was the referee for the whole event) replaced him, fearing his recently injured arm was not fully healed yet.	
3	Norikazu Fujioka	May 4, 2007	Muscle House 4	Tokyo, Japan	1	125	0		
4	Kota Ibushi	September 6, 2007	Muscle 15	Tokyo, Japan	1	243	1		
5	Sasori	May 6, 2008	Muscle House 6	Tokyo, Japan	1	322	1		
6	Tigers Mask	March 24, 2009	N/A	N/A	1	(Note: The date of at least one of the title changes in this reign is uncertain, which means that the reign lasted between 1 and 2,301 days.)	0		
—	Vacated	N/A	—	—	—	—	—	Vacated due to unknown circumstances.	
7	Atsushi Maruyama	July 12, 2015	Dramatic Dreams! Vol. 2: No Subtitle	Osaka, Japan	2	4,009+	0	Defeated Super Sasadango Machine to win the vacant title. Previously held the title as Tigers Mask.	

== Combined reigns ==
†	Indicates the current champions
¤	The exact length of at least one title reign is uncertain, so the shortest possible length is used.

Rank	Wrestler	No. of reigns	Combined defenses	Combined days
1	Tigers Mask/Atsushi Maruyama †	2	0	¤4,010+
2	Sasori	1	1	322
3	Kota Ibushi	1	1	243
4	Norikazu Fujioka	1	0	125
5	Lee Nikkan	1	0	121
6	Danshoku Dino	1	0	96

== See also ==
- DDT Pro-Wrestling
- Professional wrestling in Japan
