= Osaka Pro Wrestling Battle Royal Championship =

Professional wrestling championship

Details
- Promotion: Osaka Pro Wrestling
- Date established: March 24, 2001
- Date retired: April 20, 2014
Statistics
- First champion: Miracle Man
- Final champion: Tigers Mask
- Most reigns: Ebessan and Kuishinbo Kamen (4 times)
- Longest reign: Miracle Man (552 days)
- Shortest reign: Tigers Mask (<1 day)

The Osaka Pro Wrestling Battle Royal Championship is a title contested in the Japanese pro wrestling promotion Osaka Pro Wrestling. The title is won and lost in Battle Royals. The title was established in 2001 when Miracle Man won an 11-Man Battle Royal to become the first champion.

Being a professional wrestling championship, it is not won via direct competition; it is instead won via a predetermined ending to a match or awarded to a wrestler because of a wrestling angle. There have been 37 reigns by 20 wrestlers with three vacancies. One of the vacancies came when Black Buffalo vacated the title due to an injury.

== Title history ==
As of September 19, 2026

#	Order in reign history
Reign	The reign number for the specific set of wrestlers listed
—	Used for vacated reigns so as not to count it as an official reign
N/A	The information is not available or is unknown
+	Indicates the current reign is changing daily

#	Wrestlers	Reign	Date	Days held	Location	Notes
1	Miracle Man	1	March 24, 2001	76	Osaka, Japan	Miracle Man last eliminated Ebessan in an 11-Man Battle Royal to become the first champion.
2	Ebessan	1	June 8, 2001	254	Osaka, Japan	Ebessan last eliminated Super Delfin in a 17-Man Battle Royal to win the title.
3	Shu	1	February 17, 2002	32	Osaka, Japan	Shu last eliminated Ebessan in a 14-Man Battle Royal to win the title.
4	Ebessan	2	March 21, 2002	87	Osaka, Japan	Ebessan last eliminated Takashi Tachibana in a Ten-Man Battle Royal to win the title.
5	Shu	2	June 16, 2002	13	Osaka, Japan	Shu last eliminated Takashi Tachibana in an 11-Man Battle Royal to win the title.
6	Kuishinbo Kamen	1	June 29, 2002	45	Osaka, Japan	Kamen last eliminated Ebessan in an 11-Man Battle Royal to win the title.
7	Billyken Kid	1	August 13, 2002	43	Osaka, Japan	Kid last eliminated Super Demekin in a Nine-Man Battle Royal to win the title.
8	Ebessan	3	September 25, 2002	46	Osaka, Japan	Ebessan last eliminated Miracle Man in a Nine-Man Battle Royal to win the title.
9	Yutaka Fukuda	1	November 10, 2002	43	Osaka, Japan	Fukuda last eliminated Ebessan and Kuishinbo Kamen in an 11-Man Battle Royal to win the title.
10	Kengo Takai	1	December 23, 2002	20	Osaka, Japan	Takai last eliminates Tigers Mask in a Ten-Man Battle Royal to win the title.
11	Ebessan	4	January 12, 2003	252	Osaka, Japan	Ebessan last eliminates Billyken Kid in a Ten-Man Battle Royal to win the title.
12	Billyken Kid	2	September 21, 2003	48	Osaka, Japan	Kid last eliminated Jeremy Lopez in a 13-Man Battle Royal to win the title.
13	Miracle Man	2	November 8, 2003	211	Osaka, Japan	Miracle Man last eliminated Yutaka Fukuda in a 12-Man Battle Royal to win the title.
14	Ebessan	5	June 6, 2004	43	Osaka, Japan	Ebessan last eliminated Gamma in a 9-Man Battle Royal to win the title.
15	Tsukkomi Mask	1	July 19, 2004	420	Osaka, Japan	Mask last eliminated Kuishinbo Kamen in a 10-Man Battle Royal to win the title.
16	Ebessan	6	June 6, 2004	72	Osaka, Japan	Ebessan last eliminated Kuishinbo Kamen in a 9-Man Battle Royal to win the title.
17	Tsukkomi Mask	2	November 23, 2004	47	Osaka, Japan	Mask last eliminated Kuishinbo Kamen in an 11-Man Battle Royal to win the title.
18	Miracle Man	3	January 9, 2005	552	Osaka, Japan	Miracle Man last eliminated Kuishinbo Kamen and Trutuger in a 10-Man Battle Royal to win the title.
19	Black Buffalo	1	July 15, 2006	14	Osaka, Japan	Black Buffalo last eliminates Miracle Man in an 11-Man Battle Royal to win the title.
—	Vacant	—	July 29, 2006	—	Osaka, Japan	Black Buffalo vacates the title due to injury.
20	Mr. Carrasco	1	August 13, 2006	22	Osaka, Japan	Mr. Carrasco last eliminates Kuishinbo Kamen in a 10-Man Battle Royal to win the vacant title.
—	Vacant	—	September 4, 2006	—	Osaka, Japan	Mr. Carrasco vacates the title due to injury.
21	Kuishinbo Kamen	2	September 4, 2006	111	Osaka, Japan	
22	Santa Man	1	December 24, 2006	163	Osaka, Japan	Santa Man last eliminates Asian Cooger in a 17-Man Battle Royal to win the title.
23	Mr. Carrasco	2	June 5, 2007	1	Sendai, Japan	Mr. Carrasco last eliminates Tigers Mask in a Seven-Man Battle Royal to win the title.
24	Ebessan III	1	June 6, 2007	17	Sendai, Japan	Ebessan last eliminates Shinjitsu Nohashi in an Eight-Man Battle Royal to win the title.
25	Takoyakida	1	June 23, 2007	190	Osaka, Japan	Takoyakida last eliminates Asian Cooger in a Ten-Man Battle Royal to win the title.
—	Vacant	—	January 12, 2009	—	Osaka, Japan	Takoyakida vacated the title due to injury.
26	Ebessan III	2	January 12, 2009	188	Tokyo, Japan	Ebessan last eliminates Miracle Man in a Nine-Man Battle Royal to win the vacant title.
27	Masamune	1	July 19, 2009	182	Osaka, Japan	Masmune last eliminates Kanjyuro Matsuyama in an 11-Man Battle Royal to win the title.
28	Kanjyuro Matsuyama	1	January 17, 2010	63	Tokyo, Japan	Masuyama last eliminates Masamune in a Ten-Man Battle Royal to win the title.
29	Kuishinbo Kamen	3	March 21, 2010	111	Osaka, Japan	Kamen last eliminates Kanjyuro Matsuyama in a Nine-Man Battle Royal to win the title.
30	Ebessan III	3	July 10, 2010	215	Osaka, Japan	Ebessan last eliminated Miracle Man in a 14-Man Battle Royal to win the title.
31	Ultimate Spider Jr.	1	February 26, 2011	238	Osaka, Japan	Ultimate Spider Jr. last eliminated Kuishinbo Kamen in an 11-Man Battle Royal to win the title
32	Apple Miyuki	1	October 22, 2011	364	Osaka, Japan	Miyuki last eliminated Kanjyuro Matsuyama in a 5-Person Battle Royal to win the title
33	Kuishinbo Kamen	4	October 20, 2012	13	Osaka, Japan	Kamen last eliminated Kanjyuro Matsuyama in a 21-Person Battle Royal to win the title
34	Tadasuke	1	November 2, 2012	196	Osaka, Japan	Tadasuke last eliminated Billyken Kid and Kuishinbo Kamen in a 12-Person Battle Royal to win the title
35	Kanjyuro Matsuyama	1	May 17, 2013	225	Tokyo, Japan	Matsuyama last eliminated Tadasuke and Naoki Setoguchi in a Battle Royal to win the title
36	Naoki Setoguchi	1	December 28, 2013	113	Osaka, Japan	Setoguchi last eliminated Ebessan III and Tigers Mask in a 10-Man Battle Royal to win the title
37	Tigers Mask	1	April 20, 2014	0	Osaka, Japan	Tigers Mask last eliminated Billyken Kid in a 17-Man Battle Royal to win the title
—	Vacant	—	April 20, 2014	—	Osaka, Japan	Title vacated due to Tigers Mask leaving Osaka Pro

== List of combined reigns ==
As of September 19, 2026

†	Indicates the current champions
<1	Indicates that the combined total is less than one day.
+	Indicates the current reign is changing daily

Rank	Team	# Of Reigns	Combined Days
1.	Miracle Man	3	839
2.	Ebessan	6	754
3.	Tsukkomi Mask	2	467
4.	Ebessan III	3	420
5.	Apple Miyuki	1	364
6.	Kanjyuro Matsuyama	2	288
7.	Kuishinbo Kamen	4	280
8.	Ultimate Spider Jr.	1	238
9.	Tadasuke	4	196
10.	Takoyakida	1	190
11.	Masamune	1	182
12.	Santa Man	1	163
13.	Naoki Setoguchi	1	113
14.	Billyken Kid	2	91
15.	Shu	2	45
16.	Yutaka Fukuda	1	43
17.	Mr. Carrasco	2	23
18.	Kengo Takai	1	20
19.	Black Buffalo	1	14
20.	Tigers Mask	1	<1
