= IMP Hall =

Building in Chuo-ku, Osaka Prefecture, Japan

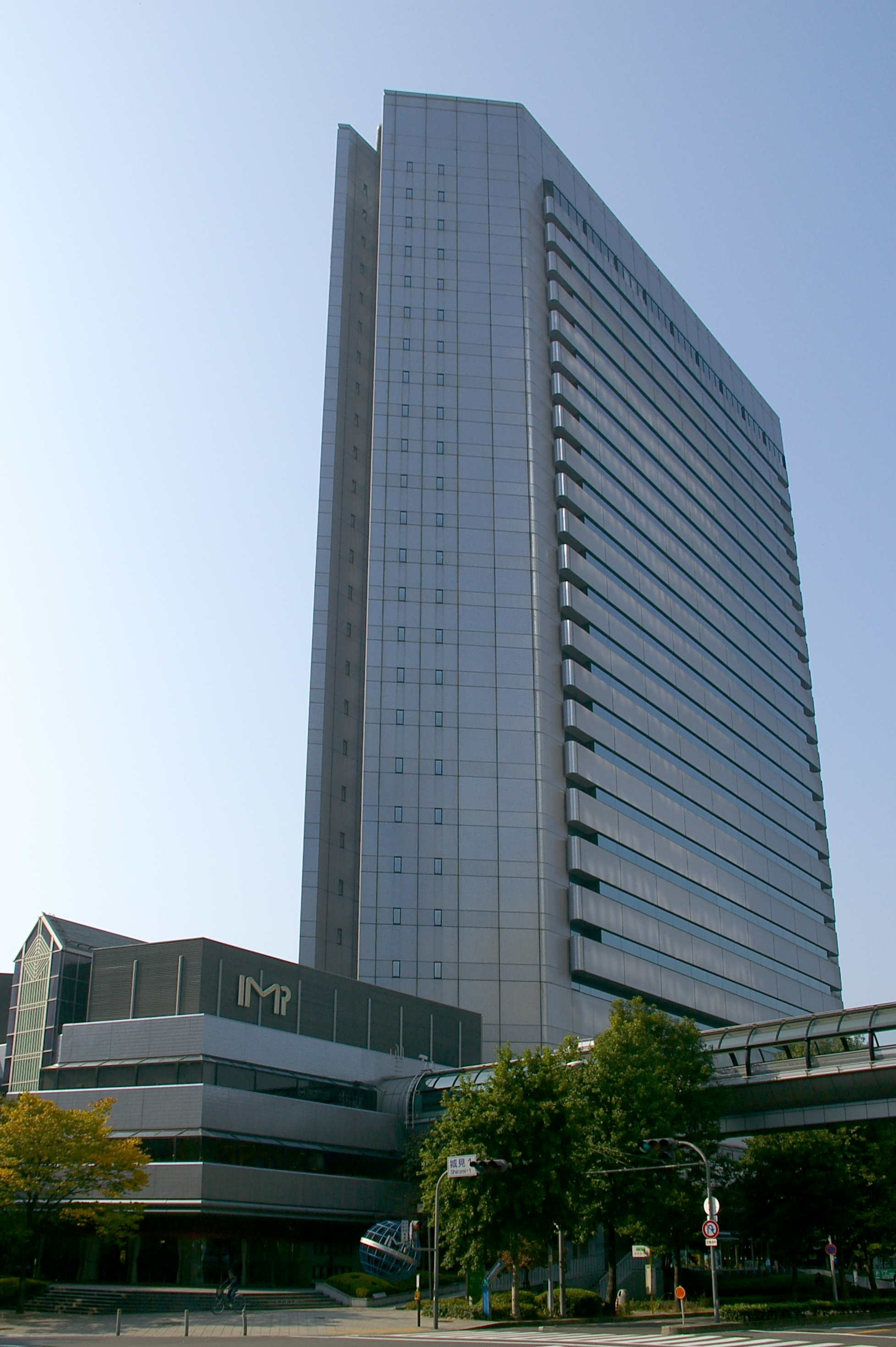
- Matsushita IMP Building in 2006
- Interactive map of IMP Hall
- Location: Osaka, Japan
- Coordinates: 34°41′31″N 135°31′51″E
- Seating type: Reserved
- Type: concert hall

Matsushita IMP Hall (松下IMPホール; usually shortened to IMP Hall) is a multi-purpose venue located on the second floor of the Matsushita IMP Building, in Osaka, Japan. It has a floor area of 642.96m^{2} and 857 movable seats. It has hosted many notable international touring artists, such as Morrissey, Night Ranger, Alice Cooper, My Chemical Romance, Linkin Park, Cheap Trick, Kansas, Iron Maiden, UFO, Green Day, Rage Against the Machine and Björk.
