= Osaka Pro Wrestling =

Japanese professional wrestling

- Osaka Pro Wrestling's logo
- Acronym: OPW
- Founded: March 4, 1999; 27 years ago
- Style: Puroresu; Comedy; Lucha libre
- Headquarters: Osaka, Japan
- Founder: Super Delfin
- Owner: Zeus
- Split from: Michinoku Pro Wrestling
- Website: www.osakaprowres.com

Osaka Pro Wrestling (Japanese: 大阪プロレス, Hepburn: Ōsaka Puroresu) is a Japanese professional wrestling promotion based in Osaka. The promotion was founded by Super Delfin on March 4, 1999, following his departure from Michinoku Pro Wrestling, and has been operated by Zeus since July 2021. Commonly associated with the comedy wrestling and lucha libre genres, Osaka Pro features a variety of masked wrestlers inspired by Osaka characters.

== History ==
In January 1999, Super Delfin announced that due to disagreements with The Great Sasuke regarding the direction of Michinoku Pro Wrestling, he would be leaving the promotion alongside several wrestlers and backstage personnel. On March 4, he officially founded Osaka Pro Wrestling (OPW) in his hometown of Osaka. Starting April 29, OPW produced their first tour, the Spicy Series 1999. The first event took place at the Namihaya Dome – now the Towa Pharmaceutical Ractab Dome – in Kadoma, Osaka and saw the team of Super Delfin, Masato Yakushiji and Naohiro Hoshikawa defeat Dick Togo, Black Buffalo and Violencia.

The promotion held a major flagship event called the Osaka Hurricane each year from 2003 to 2012 and also hosted the fourth edition of the Super J-Cup in 2004, which was the second edition of Osaka Hurricane.

In 2010 Osaka Pro started a close working relationship with American promotion Chikara.

On March 1, 2014, Osaka Pro announced that it would fold on April 20, 2014, due to financial difficulties, after which all of its wrestlers would become freelancers. Osaka Pro later announced that the promotion would continue under new president Yuji Sakagami and wrestlers Kuishinbo Kamen and Takoyakida. The new Osaka Pro Wrestling lost many of the old one's key wrestlers as well as their home base of Nasci Hall Umeda, forcing them to employ a new tour format.

In October 2021, it was announced that Zeus had been appointed as the owner and president of OPW. He became president on July 30, and on August 26, he received a share transfer from former owner Yuji Sakagami. However, he remained under contract with All Japan Pro Wrestling (AJPW) for the rest of the year.

== Roster ==
Ring name	Real name	Unit	Notes
Aran Sano	Aran Sano	VerteX	Osaka Pro Wrestling Tag Team Champion
Billyken Kid	Undisclosed	Main Unit	
Black Buffalo	Keisuke Yamada	Main Unit	Sales manager
The Bodyguard	Noboru Kurakawa	Main Unit	
Ebessan (III)	Osamu Suganuma	Main Unit	
Goliath	Undisclosed	Rogue Nation	
Hub	Yuto Kigawa	Unaffiliated	Freelancer
Joichiro Osaka	Joichiro Osaka	Main Unit	
Kuishinbo Kamen	Akinori Tsukioka	Main Unit	
Kohei Kinoshita	Kohei Kinoshita	Unaffiliated	Freelancer
Motonobu Tezuka	Motonobu Tezuka	Main Unit	
Ryuya Matsufusa	Ryuya Matsufusa	VerteX	Osaka Pro Wrestling Champion
Shigehiro Irie	Shigehiro Irie	#StrongHearts	Freelancer
Sho Mizuno	Sho Mizuno	VerteX	
Shu Asakawa	Undisclosed	Rogue Nation	
Super Delfin	Hiroto Wakita	Sea Food Pro Wrestling	Freelancer affiliated with Sea Food Pro Wrestling
Suzaku	Oji Shiiba	VerteX	Osaka Light Heavyweight Champion
Takoyakida	Undisclosed	Main Unit	
Tigers Mask	Atsushi Maruyama	Main Unit	Osaka Pro Wrestling Tag Team Champion
TiiiDA	Undisclosed	VerteX	
Toru	Toru Matsunaga	Rogue Nation	
Tsubasa	Undisclosed	Main Unit	
Ultimate Spider Jr.	Undisclosed	Main Unit	
Yasutaka Oosera	Yasutaka Oosera	Rogue Nation	Signed to Michinoku Pro Wrestling
Zeus	Kensho Obayashi	Main Unit	Owner and president of OPW

=== Notable alumni ===
- Apple Miyuki (RDPW)
- Atsushi Kotoge (Noah)
- Azumi Hyuga (JWP Joshi Puroresu)
- Daigoro Kashiwa (Kaientai Dojo)
- Daisuke Harada (Noah)
- Gamma (D-Gate)
- Gami (Wave Pro)
- Hayata (Noah)
- Kaito Ishida (D-Gate)
- Kanjyuro Matsuyama
- Kuuga
- Magnitude Kishiwada (Freelancer)
- Masamune (DES)
- Orochi (DES)
- Rising Hayato (AJPW)
- Sawako Shimono (Freelancer)
- Takaku Fuke (Pancrase Mission)
- Tadasuke
- Thunder
- Yuu Yamagata

== Staff ==
- Keigo Yoshino (Referee)
- Naoki (Ring announcer)
- Shinjiro Miyao (Ring announcer)
- Zeus (President and Owner)

== Championships ==
=== Active ===
Championship	Current champion(s)	Reign	Date won	Days held	Location	Notes	Ref.
Osaka Pro Wrestling Championship	Ryuya Matsufusa	1	December 7, 2025	286+	Osaka, Japan	Defeated Toru at Excalibur 2025.	
Osaka Light Heavyweight Championship	Suzaku	1	July 5, 2026	76+	Osaka, Japan	Defeated Ultimate Spider Jr. at Osaka Pro Summer Battle 2026.	
Osaka Meibutsu Sekaiichi Championship	Tigers Mask	2	July 20, 2026	61+	Osaka, Japan	Defeated Joichiro Osaka at Osaka Pro Osaka Castle Town Festival 2026.	
Osaka Pro Wrestling Tag Team Championship	Rogue Nation (Shu Asakawa and Toru)	1 (3, 2)	July 20, 2026	61+	Osaka, Japan	Defeated Takosupa (Takoyakida and Ultimate Spider Jr.) at Osaka Pro Osaka Castle Town Festival 2026.	

=== Inactive ===
Championship	Last champion(s)	Reign	Date won	Location	Notes	Ref.
Osaka Owarai Championship	Joichiro Osaka	—	January 8, 2023	Osaka, Japan	Won a battle royal to win the championship. The title change was voided when Billyken Kid confessed he had lost the physical title belt prior to the match. It was then replaced with the revived Osaka Meibutsu Sekaiichi Championship.	
Super Welterweight Championship	Super Delfin	5	November 28, 1999	Osaka, Japan	Defeated Black Buffalo then immediately abandoned the title to create the Osaka Pro Wrestling Championship.	
MWF World Junior Heavyweight Championship	Goya Mask	2	October 3, 2008	Naha, Japan	Won a 10-man battle royale by last eliminating Kaijin Habu-otoko to win the vacant title. Title deactivated in 2012 when Okinawa Pro-Wrestling, where the title had moved to in May 2008, closed.	
Tenpohzan Grand Prix Championship	Miracle Man	2	November 22, 2011	Osaka, Japan	Defeated Takoyakida at Osaka Happy Weekday. Title moved to FFF Pro-Wrestling.	
Osaka Pro Wrestling Battle Royal Championship	Tigers Mask	1	April 20, 2014	Osaka, Japan	Won a 18-man battle royale by last eliminating Billyken Kid to win the title. Title deactivated two days later when Tigers Mask left the promotion.	

== Annual tournaments ==
Tournament	Last winner(s)	Date won
Tennōzan	Ryuya Matsufusa	September 28, 2025
Osaka Tag Festival	Aran Sano and Tigers Mask	February 24, 2025
Osaka Light Heavyweight Tournament	Suzaku	May 25, 2025

== Major events ==
- Osaka Hurricane

== See also ==
- Professional wrestling in Japan
- List of professional wrestling promotions in Japan
