= Kanjyuro Matsuyama =

Japanese professional wrestler (born 1984)

Chiharu Watanabe
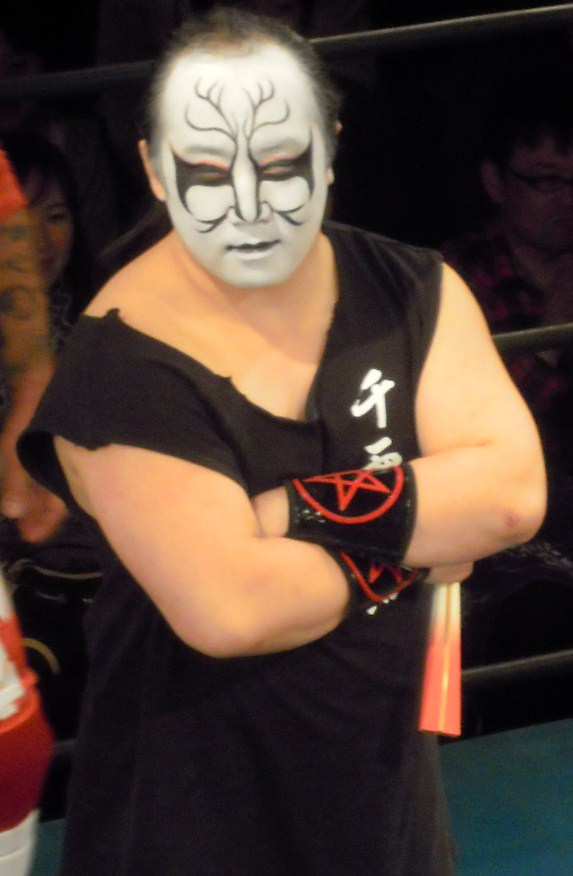
- Watanabe as Matsuyama in 2011

Personal information
- Born: April 13, 1984 (age 42) Minamikanbara District, Niigata, Japan

Professional wrestling career
- Ring name(s): Chiharu Watanabe; Kanjyuro Matsuyama
- Billed height: 1.63 m (5 ft 4 in)
- Billed weight: 85 kg (187 lb)
- Trained by: Último Dragón; Jorge "Skayde" Rivera
- Debut: February 22, 2004

Chiharu Watanabe (渡辺 千春, Watanabe Chiharu) is a Japanese professional wrestler, better known for his ring name Kanjyuro Matsuyama (松山 勘十郎, Matsuyama Kanjūrō). He has worked in Toryumon and Michinoku Pro Wrestling, but is more famous for his long career in Osaka Pro Wrestling. Along with Kikutaro and Stalker Ichikawa, he is considered one of the greatest three comedy wrestlers in Japan.

== Career ==
=== Toryumon (2004–2006) ===
Watanabe trained in the Último Dragón Gym and graduated in the 13 Toryumon school class term, debuting in Toryumon Mexico in 2004 against Small Dandy Fujii. He adopted the gimmick of Kanjyuro Matsuyama, a flamboyant, kumadori-wearing kabuki actor. Matsuyama still competed in Mexico until 2006, teaming up with Milanito Collection a.t. and wrestling in low profile matches. In 2005, however, he was sent to Chikara as a Toryumon representative, accompanying his master Skayde and trying to apply for the Young Lions Cup before being eliminated by Icarus. Upon his return to Toryumon, he left for Japan and never came back to Mexico.

=== Michinoku Pro Wrestling (2006–2007) ===
He started working in Michinoku Pro Wrestling in October 2006, teaming with The Great Sasuke to compete in the Futaritabi Tag Team Tournament, although only to be eliminated at the first round by Osaka Pro Wrestling representatives Ebessan and Kuishinbo Kamen. Afterwards, he feuded with Otoko Sakari, having a series of five matches which Matsuyama won by 4–3. Watanabe oscillated between MPW and Osaka Pro Wrestling through 2007, until he settled down in Osaka Pro in 2007.

=== Osaka Pro Wrestling (2007–2014) ===
Matsuyama was a mainstay of Osaka Pro Wrestling until 2014, when he left the promotion. He continued making sporadic appearances over the years.

He currently runs Matsuyamaza Pro Wrestling, which is based out of Osaka, Japan and hosts many top Japanese wrestling stars from the past and present, as well as international pro wrestlers.

== Championships and accomplishments ==
- Dramatic Dream Team

- Ironman Heavymetalweight Championship (2 times)

- Osaka Pro Wrestling

- Osaka Pro Wrestling Battle Royal Championship (1 time)
- Osaka Meibutsu Sekaiichi Championship (2 times)
- Osaka Pro Wrestling Owarai Championship (3 times)
- UWA World Trios Championship (1 time) - with Ebessan III & Kuishinbo Kamen
- FM Osaka Cup 1 Day Six Man Tag Tournament (2009) - with Ebessan III & Kuishinbo Kamen

=== Luchas de Apuestas record ===
Winner (wager)	Loser (wager)	Location	Event	Date	Notes
Kanjyuro Matsuyama (hair)	Otoko Sakari (hair)	Tokyo, Japan	Michi Pro Ride High	February 24, 2007	
