= Kikutaro =

Japanese professional wrestler

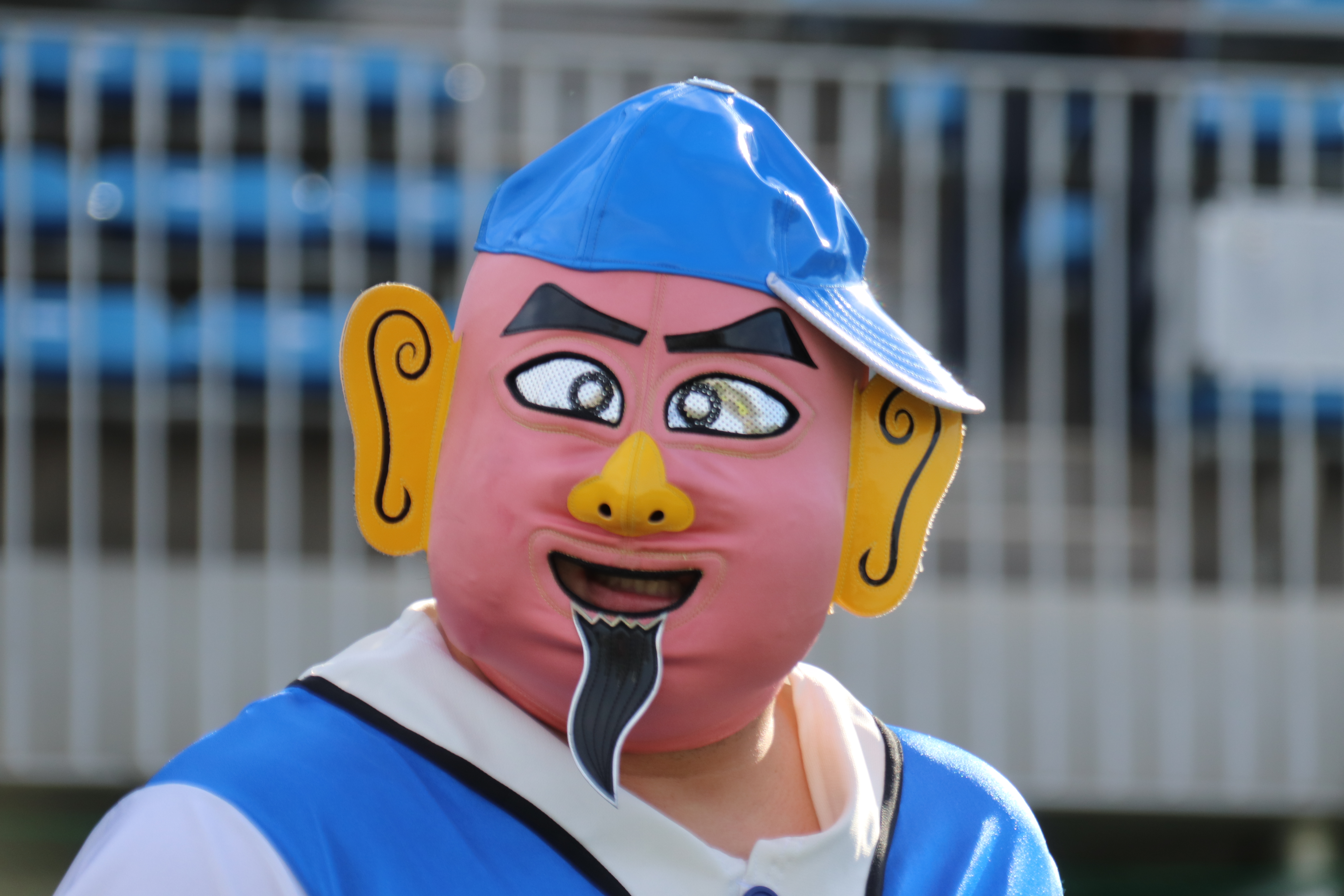
- Kikutaro in 2021

Personal information
- Born: November 17, 1976 (age 49) Osaka, Japan

Professional wrestling career
- Ring name(s): Bret KikuHart; Dump Kiku; Ebedullah the Butcher; Ebessan; Ebestan Hansen; Ebetaro; Jumbo Kiku; Jyushin Thunder Ebesga; Keiji Ebitoh; Kiku-Kiku-Kiku; Kiku Angle; Kiku Flair; Kiku H Kiku-san Hansen; Kiku Hiroshi; Kikutaro; Kikutasu Jack; Kikutimate Warrior; Kikuzawa; Killer Kiku; Mitsunobu Kikuzawa; Teriyaki Boy; Momochi Sandayū; Teriyakitaro; Kodo Fuyukiku
- Billed height: 1.70 m (5 ft 7 in)
- Billed weight: 111 kg (245 lb)
- Trained by: Masanobu Kurisu
- Debut: May 14, 1994

Mitsunobu Kikuzawa (菊澤 光信, Kikuzawa Mitsunobu; born November 17, 1976), better known as his wrestling persona Kikutaro (菊タロー, Kikutarō) and Ebessan (えべっさん, Ebessan), is a Japanese professional wrestler who works as a freelancer.

Though best known for wrestling under a mask, he also regularly works unmasked under the ring name Kikuzawa (stylized in all capital letters), representing Tokyo Gurentai. Kikuzawa has also made appearances in North America, competing in promotions such as Chikara, Pro Wrestling Guerrilla (PWG), Ring of Honor (ROH), Impact Wrestling, Game Changer Wrestling, F1RST Wrestling and Beyond Wrestling.

== Career ==
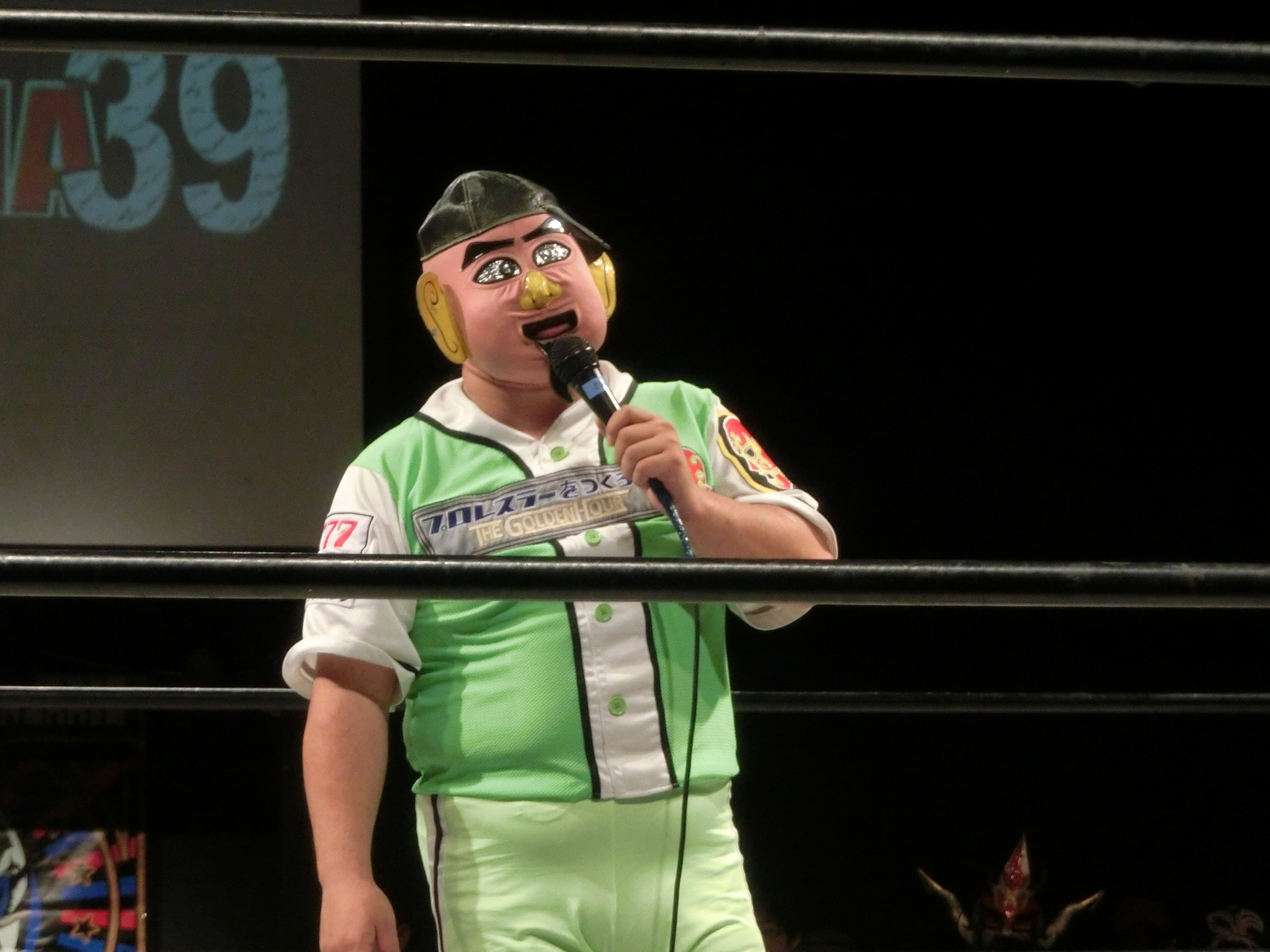
Kikutaro in 2018

Kikuzawa started his wrestling career in 1994, wrestling under his birth name for the new Tokyo Pro Wrestling (TPW) and hardcore wrestling promotions such as International Wrestling Association of Japan (IWA Japan) and Wrestling International New Generations (W*ING). He eventually signed with Osaka Pro Wrestling and Dramatic Dream Team (DDT), where he continued to use his real name while competing for DDT.

While wrestling for Osaka Pro, he began wearing a mask as a character named Ebessan based on Ebisu, the Japanese god of good fortune. Using comedic spots to get over with the crowd, Ebessan was immediately accepted by the Osaka Pro crowd. He moved up the ranks quickly and soon made Osaka Pro his full-time home in 2001. Ebessan became particularly well known for his rivalry with Kuishinbo Kamen, the two having many fun and comedic matches. They even worked as a tag team from time to time.

As Ebessan was OPW's registered trademark, Kikuzawa was forced to give away his Ebessan character to Flying Kid Ichihara before leaving the company in 2005. Kikuzawa modified his character and used the name Ebetaro, but he would end up settling down for a new, original gimmick. He became Kikutaro, a masked, exaggerated self-parodic alter ego who behaved both goofy and self-important, wearing always colored tracksuits and baseball caps. He kept most of his comedic spots and impersonations, however, as well as his feud with Kuishinbo Kamen, adding now the new Ebessan to the enmity.

In 2006, he began competing for All Japan Pro Wrestling (AJPW), where he continued to work through the years. He often wrestled in the opening match, but also offered himself as an ally to Keiji Muto in his feud against Voodoo Murders and other factions.

In 2014, Kikuzawa returned to the Ebessan gimmick when performing in Osaka Pro Wrestling after Osamu Suganuma, who had been wrestling as the third incarnation of Ebessan, left the company. Suganuma returned to Osaka Pro in 2021 as Ebessan, and is sometimes referred to as Ebessan III (3代目えべっさん, Sandaime Ebessan) while Kikuzawa is referred to as Ebessan I (初代えべっさん, Shodai Ebessan) to avoid confusion.

In December 2016, Kikutaro moved from Japan to the United States. He currently resides in Las Vegas, Nevada.

== Tributes ==
Kikuzawa has been known to do tributes to many wrestlers throughout his career, either through subtle imitations or by doing full imitations of their gimmick. He typically includes a tribute to Keiji Muto in his matches by performing Muto's signature elbow drop and Shining Wizard, as well as using Muto's "love" pose. Kikuzawa has also done many tributes to wrestlers in "borrowing" their gimmicks by dressing in similar attire and performing their signature moves. Kikuzawa has famously imitated Stan Hansen, Abdullah the Butcher, Jyushin Thunder Liger, Keiji Muto, Triple H, Bret Hart, Cactus Jack, Bill Goldberg, Kurt Angle, Ric Flair and Yuji Nagata.

== Championships and accomplishments ==
- Compound Pro Wrestling

- Oklahoma X Division Championship (1 time)

- Dragon Gate

- Open the Owarai Gate Championship (3 times)
- Open the Owarai Twin Gate Championship (1 time) – with Don Fujii

- Dramatic Dream Team

- Ironman Heavymetalweight Championship (8 times)

- Frontier Martial-Arts Wrestling

- Barbed Wire Street Fight Six Man Tag Team Championship (2 times) – with Atsushi Onita and Okumura (1), and Atsushi Onita and Exciting Yoshida (1)

- Impact Wrestling

- Gravy Train Turkey Trot (2018) – with KM, Alisha Edwards, Fallah Bahh, Dezmond Xavier

- Mobius

- El Mejor de Máscara Championship (1 time)

- Nosawa Bom-Ba-Ye

- NGF Heavyweight Championship (1 time)

- Osaka Pro Wrestling

- Osaka Meibutsu Sekaiichi Championship (3 times)
- Osaka Owarai Championship (1 time)
- Osaka Pro Wrestling Battle Royal Championship (6 times)

- Pro Wrestling Illustrated

- PWI ranked him #185 of the top 500 singles wrestlers in the PWI 500 in 2006

- Tokyo Gurentai

- Tokyo Intercontinental Tag Team Championship (1 time) – with Stalker Ichikawa

- Ultimate Superstars Action

- USA World Tag Team Championship (1 time) – with Hulk Puchihogan
