= Atsushi Maruyama =

Japanese professional wrestler

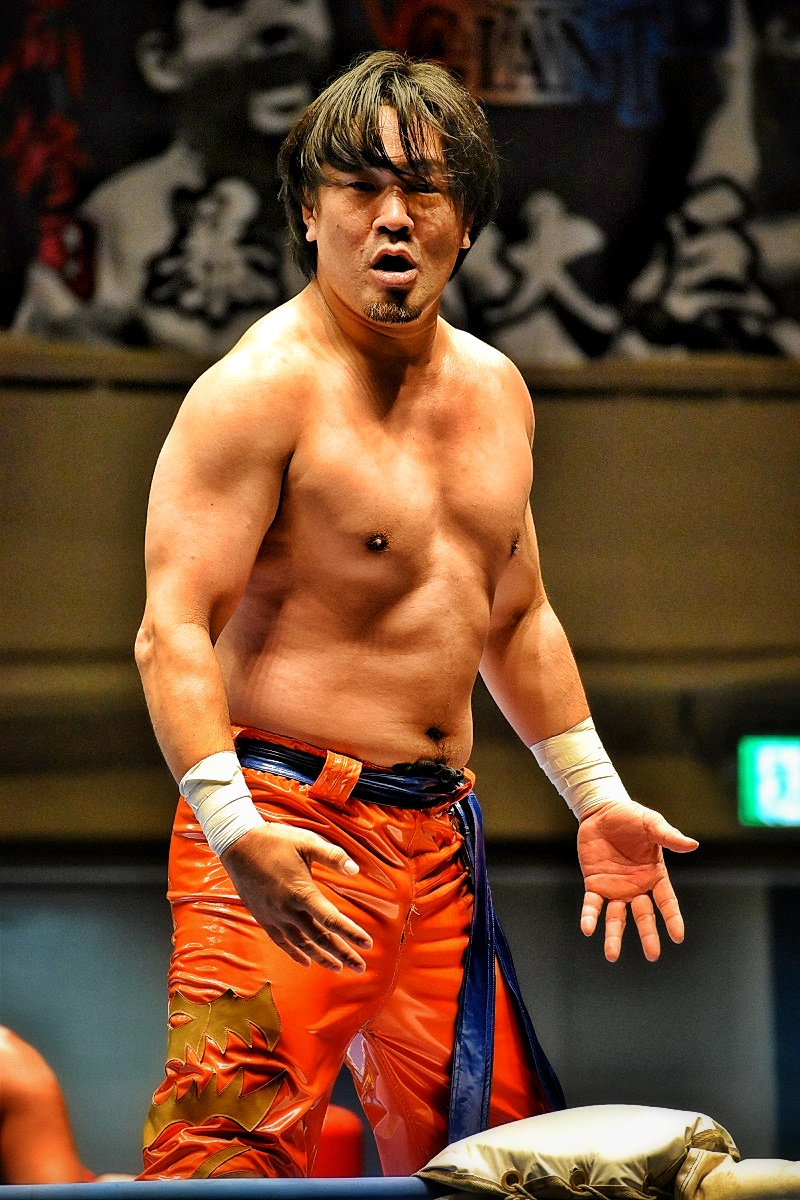
- Maruyama in September 2019

Personal information
- Born: Atsushi Maruyama; June 14, 1976 (age 50) Takatsuki, Osaka

Professional wrestling career
- Ring name(s): Akatora; Atsushi Maruyama; Eagles Mask; Hong Kong Kokusai Fujin Keisatsu Man; Teppei; Tigers Mask; Izanagi
- Billed height: 1.75 m (5 ft 9 in)
- Billed weight: 85 kg (187 lb; 13.4 st)
- Trained by: Super Delfin; Kaijin Habu Otoko
- Debut: May 19, 2001

Atsushi Maruyama (丸山 敦, Maruyama Atsushi; born on June 14, 1976) is a Japanese professional wrestler, currently signed to All Japan Pro Wrestling (AJPW). He previously worked for Osaka Pro Wrestling under the ring name Tigers Mask (タイガースマスク, Taigāsu Masuku). His ring name and original wrestling attire were inspired by the Hanshin Tigers baseball team.

== Professional wrestling career ==
On February 8, 2014, Tigers Mask announced his resignation from Osaka Pro, effective April 20, after which he began working in the Tokyo area under a new persona. On April 22, 2014, Maruyama made his first appearance unmasked, announcing that in the future he would be working under his real name. Maruyama also adopted two new ring names, when he started to work for Pro Wrestling Heat Up as Akatora (アカトラ, Akatora) and Kaientai Dojo as Teppei (stylized in all capital letters).

In January 2018, Maruyama signed with All Japan Pro Wrestling (AJPW) and adopted the name Izanagi (イザナギ, Izanagi) in 2020.

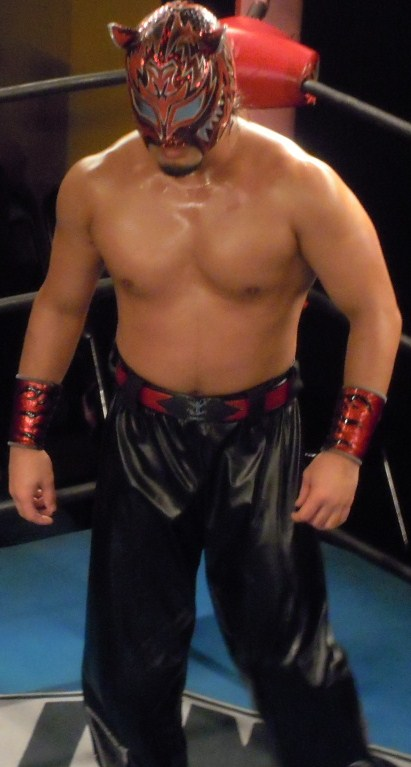
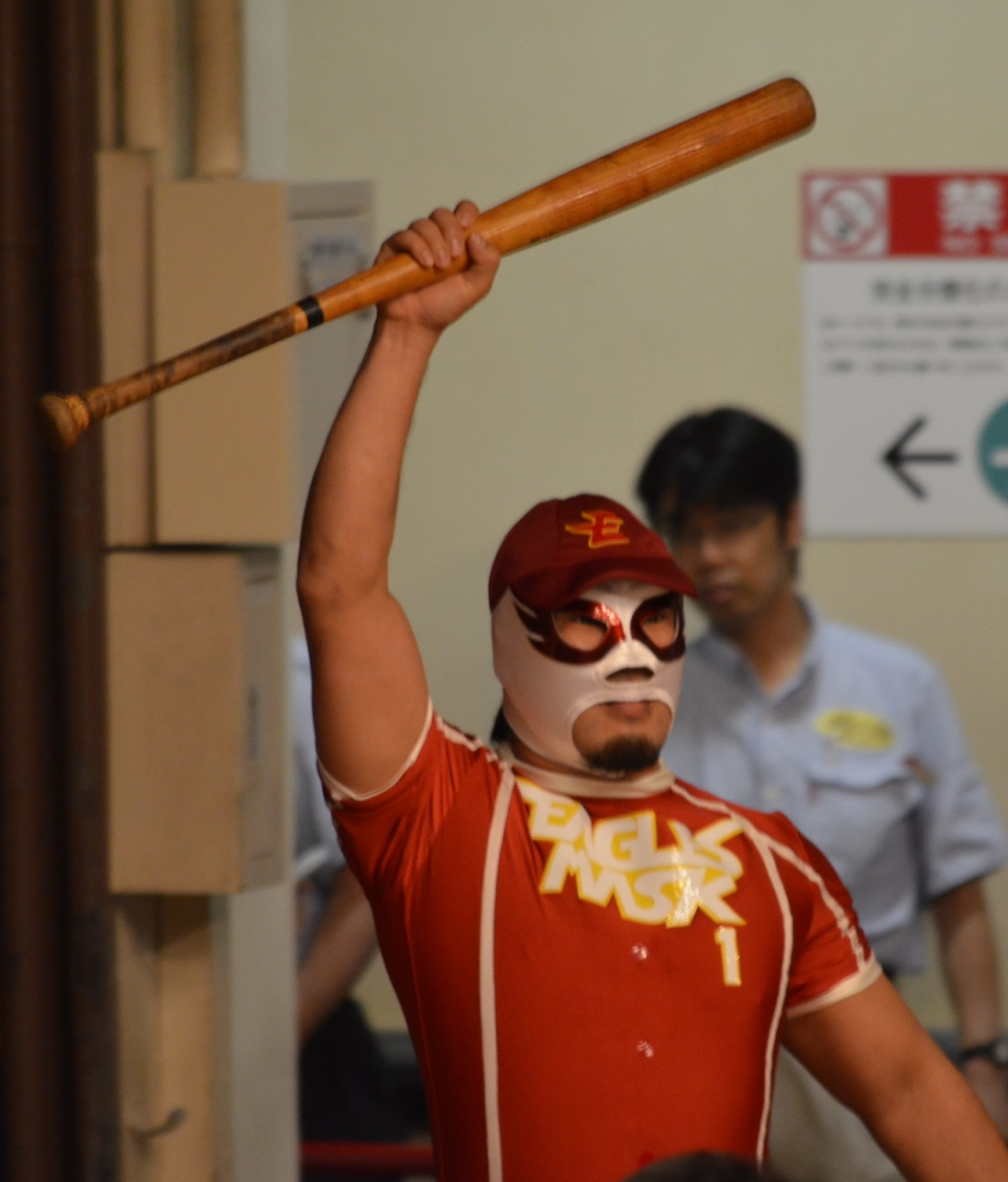
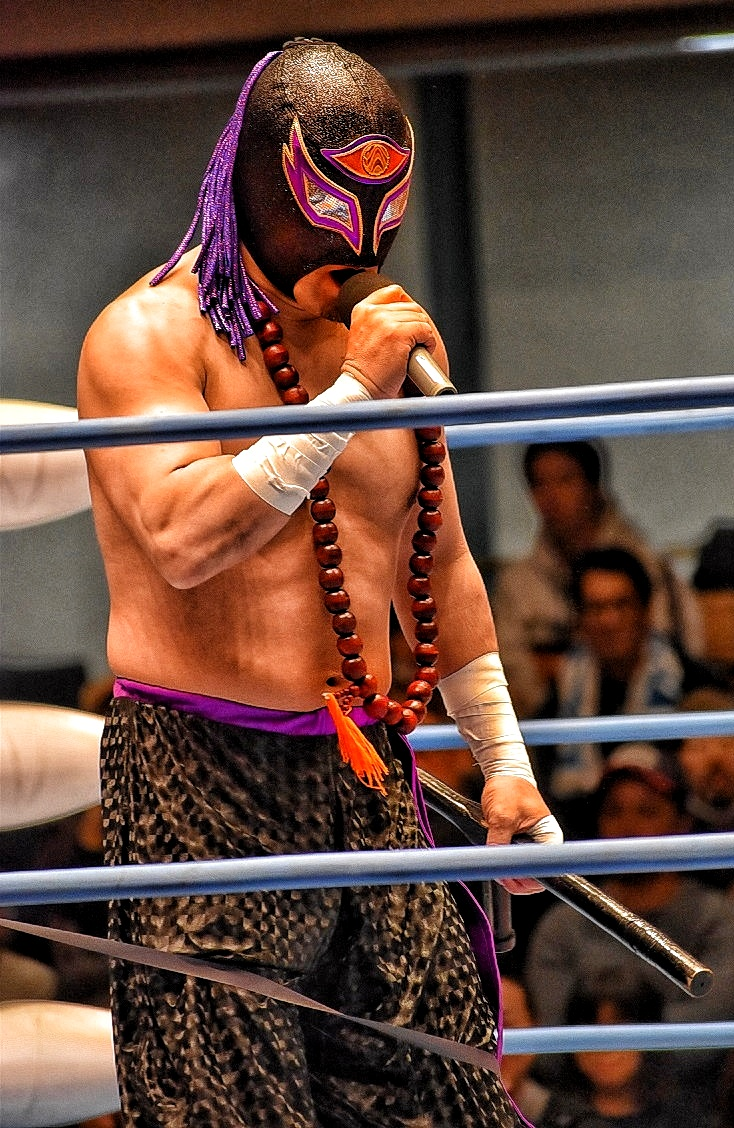
Some of Maruyama's masked personas: as Tigers Mask (left), as Eagles Mask (center) and as Izanagi (right)

== Championships and accomplishments ==
- All Japan Pro Wrestling
  - All Asia Tag Team Championship (1 time) – with Zeus
  - Gaora TV Championship (1 time)
  - World Junior Heavyweight Championship (1 time)
  - Jr. Tag Battle of Glory (2017) – with Masashi Takeda
- DDT Pro-Wrestling
  - IMGP World Heavyweight Championship (2 times, current)
  - Ironman Heavymetalweight Championship (2 times)
- Dragon Gate
  - Open the Brave Gate Championship (1 time)
- Kaientai Dojo
  - Independent World Junior Heavyweight Championship (3 times)
- Kyushu Pro-Wrestling
  - Glocal Tag Tournament (2022) – - with Hub
- Mexican Wrestling Federation
  - MWF World Junior Heavyweight Championship (1 time)
- Michinoku Pro Wrestling
  - Tohoku Tag Team Championship (1 time) – with Flash Moon
  - Iron Man Tournament (2008)
- Osaka Pro Wrestling
  - CMLLL World Super Mexico Championship (1 time, current)
  - Osaka Light Heavyweight Championship (1 time, inaugural)
  - Osaka Pro Wrestling Battle Royal Championship (1 time)
  - Osaka Pro Wrestling Owarai Championship (2 times)
  - Osaka Meibutsu Sekaiichi Championship (1 time)
  - Osaka Pro Wrestling Championship (4 times)
  - Osaka Pro Wrestling Tag Team Championship (4 times) – with Billyken Kid (1), Black Buffalo (2) and Aran Sano (1)
  - First Grand Slam Chanpion
  - Osaka Tag Festival (2006) – with Flash Moon
  - Osaka Tag Festival (2007) – with Billyken Kid
  - Osaka Tag Festival (2011) – with Black Buffalo
  - Osaka Tag Festival (2024) – with Zeus
  - Osaka Tag Festival (2025) – with Aran Sano
  - Tennōzan (2007, 2022)
  - Osaka Light Heavvyweight Title Tournament (2022)
- Pro Wrestling Illustrated
  - Ranked No. 232 of the top 500 singles wrestlers in the PWI 500 in 2022
- Pro Wrestling Zero1
  - NWA International Lightweight Tag Team Championship (1 time) – with Billyken Kid
