= Zeus (Japanese wrestler) =

Zainichi Korean wrestler (born 1982)

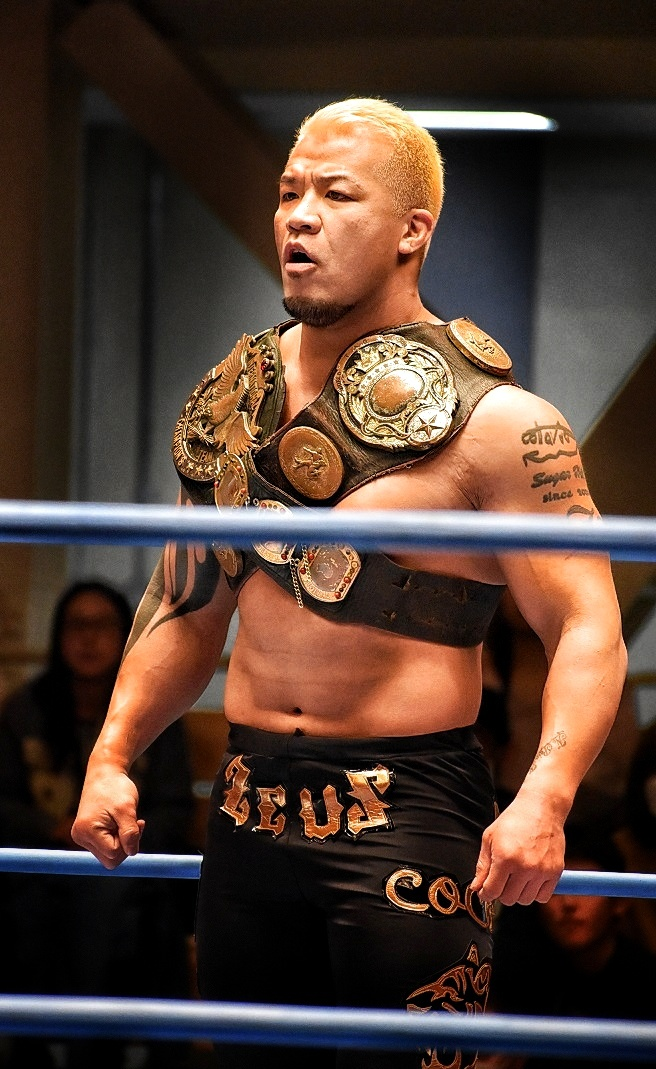
- Zeus in 2020

Personal information
- Born: Kim Bǒn-u; January 27, 1982 (age 44) Ikuno-ku, Osaka, Osaka, Japan

Professional wrestling career
- Ring name(s): Zeus; Kensho Obayashi; Zeus Kanaya
- Billed height: 181 cm (5 ft 11 in)
- Billed weight: 105 kg (231 lb)
- Trained by: Gamma
- Debut: November 11, 2006

Kensho Obayashi (大林 賢将, Ōbayashi Kenshō), born Kim Bǒn-u (Korean: 김번우; January 27, 1982), and formerly Shigemasa Kanaya (金谷 成格, Kanaya Shigemasa), is a Japanese bodybuilder, professional wrestler, and former boxer best known by his ring name Zeus (ゼウス, Zeusu). He is currently signed to Osaka Pro Wrestling, where he also serves as owner and company president. He is perhaps best known for his time in All Japan Pro Wrestling (AJPW), where he is a former AJPW Triple Crown Heavyweight Champion and a four-time World Tag Team Champion alongside Bodyguard as The Big Guns.

Obayashi began his career in Osaka Pro, where he is a former Osaka Pro Champion and three-time Osaka Tag Team Champion, winning the championship once with Gaina and twice with longtime rival-turned-partner Bodyguard. Outside of Osaka Pro and All Japan, he is a former NWA Intercontinental Tag Team Champion, NWA United National Heavyweight Champion and winner of the 2012 Furinkazan Tournament with James Raideen in the Zero1 promotion, and a former Ironman Heavymetalweight Champion in DDT Pro-Wrestling (DDT).

Obayashi is of Korean descent. His Korean name is Kim Bǒn-u (金 繁優, 김번우), but he used the tsūmei Shigemasa Kanaya (金谷 成格, Kanaya Shigemasa) until he legally changed his name to Kensho Obayashi when he was naturalized in 2011.

== Professional wrestling career ==
=== Osaka Pro Wrestling (2006–2009; 2010–2013; 2021–present) ===
==== Early years (2006–2009) ====
In the run up to the 2006 Tennozan Finals, a brief video hyped up the debut of a mysterious new wrestler. That man was revealed to be Zeus, who would make his first appearance at that show, first bending a frying pan in a show of strength and then aligning himself with Gaina & Condor, taking out the OPW Seikigun. Soon after joining forces, the group dubbed themselves "Bad Force". Nicknamed "God of Destroy", Zeus went undefeated for several months after his debut. He teamed up with Gaina to win the Osaka Pro Tag Title shortly afterwards, but they would lose them at Hurricane 2007 to Hideyoshi & Masamune in a three-way match also featuring Tsubasa and Flash Moon. Zeus started to break out as a singles wrestler in late 2007, reaching the Tennozan final but losing to the Osaka Pro Champion, Tigers Mask. Super Delfin then started to take an interest in Zeus, offering to teach him more about professional wrestling and give him further training. Despite the rest of Bad Force’s protests, Zeus accepted Delfin’s offer and eventually left the group. After Hurricane 2008, he started the rookie group Blood & Guts (B&G), recruiting Daisuke Harada, Tadasuke and eventually Atsushi Kotoge to join.

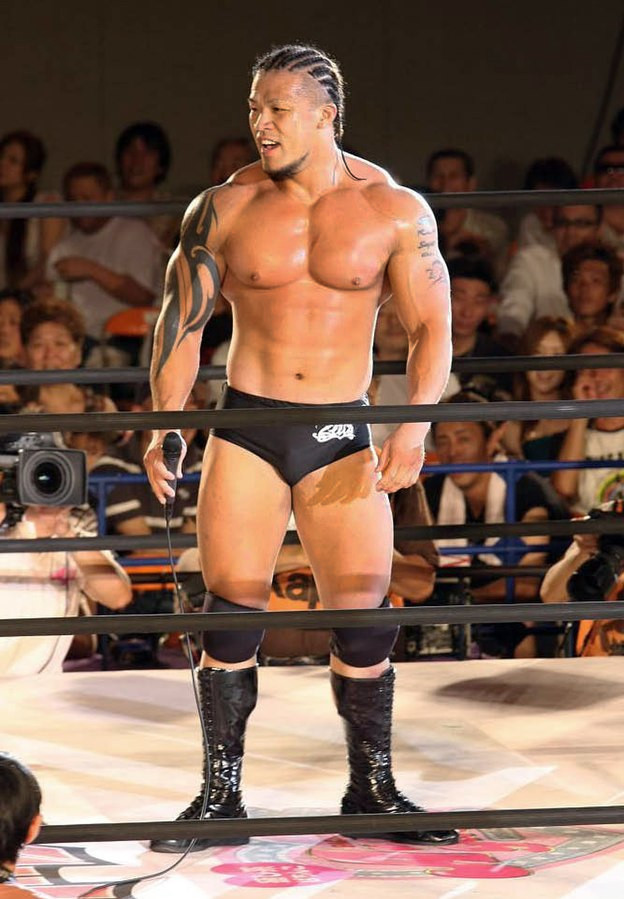
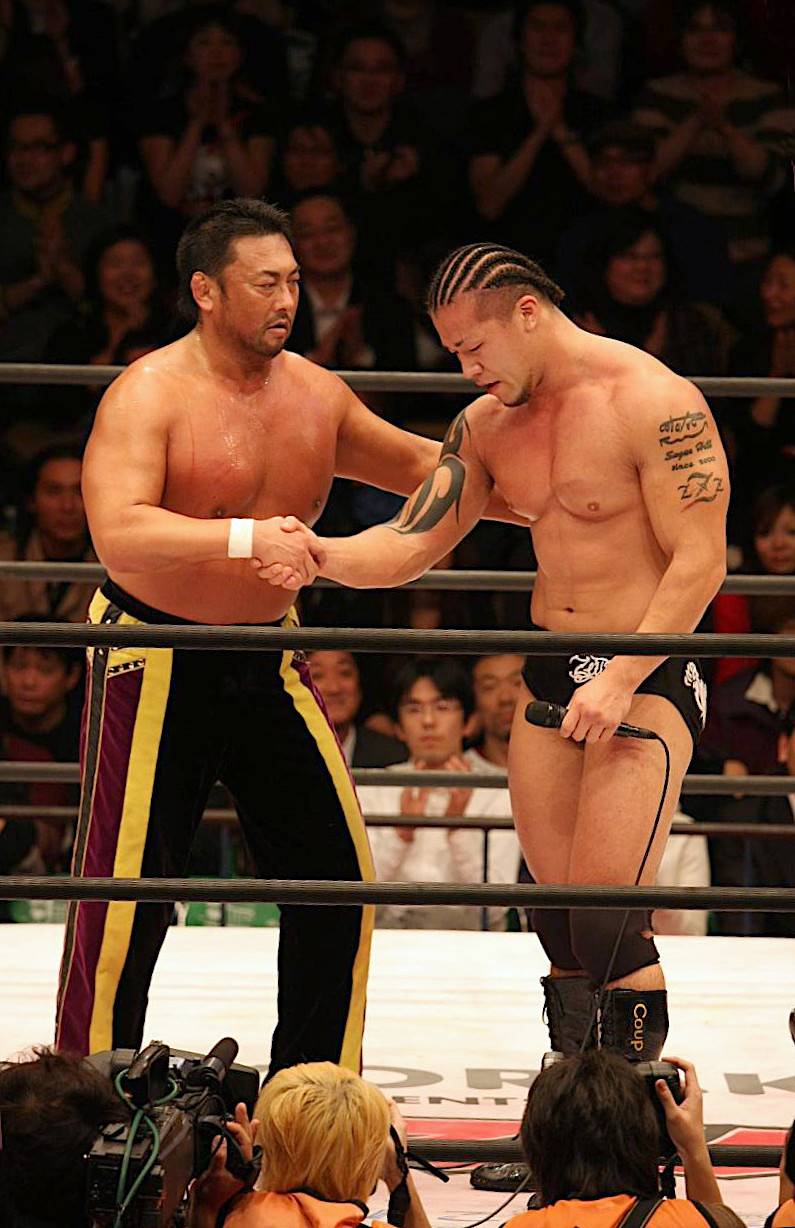
Zeus in 2008: In the ring at Christmas Day Hustle (left) and shaking hands after a match with Toshiaki Kawada (right)

In 2008, Zeus started to appear in other promotions, most notably facing and later teaming with veteran Toshiaki Kawada in Hustle. It was in Hustle that he picked up a clean singles win over former IWGP Heavyweight Champion Bob Sapp. Zeus produced his own show in December and hinted at a major announcement at Hurricane 2009. After defeating the Bodyguard, Zeus announced that he was going to start training for a career in boxing and that he would be leaving the wrestling industry effective immediately.

==== Return to OPW (2010–2013) ====
After retiring from boxing, Obayashi announced his return to professional wrestling in July 2010. His in-ring return was delayed after he underwent further training and spent time to trying to build up body mass after losing a lot of weight for boxing. His official return to wrestling took place in November 2010 at Osaka Pro: Zeus Will Be Back, where he teamed with Daisuke Sekimoto to defeat Akebono and Don Fujii. Shortly after returning, Zeus re-ignited his old rivalry with the Bodyguard. The two traded wins back and forth for months, but eventually formed a tag team in early 2011 after Bodyguard was kicked out of the Joker stable, and Zeus saved him from an attack by the rest of Joker. Known collectively as the Big Guns, they would go on to hold the Osaka Pro Tag Title for a short time in early 2011. The Big Guns started to achieve major success in 2013, winning the Osaka Tag Festival and the Osaka Pro Wrestling Tag Team Championship for the second time later that year. In the 2013 Tennozan, Zeus and Bodyguard faced each other in the finals with Zeus coming out victorious. On March 1, 2014, it was announced that Osaka Pro would be folding due to financial difficulties. On April 20, all of its workers became freelancers. It was later announced that the promotion would continue under new management, but Zeus and Bodyguard eventually vacated their all of their championships, and on April 20 wrestled their last match in OPW, teaming with Quiet Storm in a losing effort against Billyken Kid, Bull Armor Takuya and Black Buffalo.

==== As owner of OPW (2022–present) ====
In October 2021, he announced that he had been appointed as the owner and president of Osaka Pro Wrestling. He became president on July 30, and on August 26, he received a share transfer from former owner Yuji Sakagami. However, he remained under contract with All Japan Pro Wrestling (AJPW) for the rest of the year.

=== Pro Wrestling Zero1 (2011–2014) ===
Zeus debuted with Zero1 in 2011, taking part in the 2011 Fire Festival, finishing with 3 points and therefore not advancing to the final. In September, he teamed with Masato Tanaka to capture the NWA Intercontinental Tag Team Championship from Kohei Sato and Kamikaze. Zeus and Tanaka held the title for over a year, eventually losing them to Yusuke Obata and Shito Ueda in November 2012. Zeus and James Raideen participated in the 2012 Furinkazan tournament, defeating Ueda and Obata in the final on December 15. On February 3, 2013, Kohei Sato and Zeus received an opportunity at the vacated NWA Intercontinental Tag Team Championship, but lost to Zero64 (Akebono and Daisuke Sekimoto). On July 30, Zeus defeated Ikuto Hidaka to win the NWA United National Heavyweight Championship. Zeus held the championship for 6 months, losing it in January 2014 to Tama Williams in his first defense and last appearance in Zero1 to date.

=== DDT Pro-Wrestling (2014) ===
Zeus made his debut for DDT in March 2014, when he and The Bodyguard defeated the Nuru Nuru Brothers (Michael Nakazawa & Tomomitsu Matsunaga). On September 13, Zeus received an opportunity at the DDT Extreme Division Championship, losing against Danshoku Dino in a "Kiss Pin" match. On February 15, Zeus won the Ironman Heavymetalweight Championship, defeating Soma Takao, but later that day he lost the championship back to Tomomitsu Matsunaga.

=== All Japan Pro Wrestling (2014–2021) ===
On March 28, Zeus and The Bodyguard made their debut for AJPW, defeating Menso～re Oyaji and Sushi. On May 16, Zeus and The Bodyguard received an opportunity at the World Tag Team Championship, but were unable to defeat defending champions Evolution (Joe Doering and Suwama). Zeus and Bodyguard both participated in the 2014 Ōdō Tournament as singles competitors, with Zeus being eliminated in the second round by eventual winner Go Shiozaki and Bodyguard in the first round by Takao Omori. Zeus and The Bodyguard participated in the 2014 World's Strongest Tag Determination League, finishing with 8 points but not making it to the final.

On January 12, 2015, Zeus defeated Kenso to become the new #1 contender to the Triple Crown Heavyweight Championship. On February 7, Zeus failed to capture the championship from Go Shiozaki. Both Zeus and The Bodyguard participated in the 2015 Champion Carnival Tournament, with Zeus finishing the tournament with 3 points in Block B and Bodyguard finishing with 2 points in Block A. On May 31, they received another shot at the World Tag Team Championship, but were unable to defeat Xceed (Go Shiozaki and Kento Miyahara). On August 15, Zeus and Bodyguard scored a big win, defeating former World Tag Team Champions Akebono and Yutaka Yoshie. The following day, Zeus made his second challenge for the Triple Crown Heavyweight Championship, this time losing to Akebono. Zeus and The Bodyguard participated in the 2015 World's Strongest Tag Determination League, losing their first two matches but managing to win the rest of their matches, and make it into the finals, finishing the tournament with 8 points. In the final, they were defeated by Kento Miyahara and Suwama. On December 23, Zeus and Bodyguard finally captured the World Tag Team Championship, defeating Wild Burning (Jun Akiyama and Takao Omori).

On January 10, 2016, after Zeus, Bodyguard, and Billyken Kid defeated Suwama, Atsushi Aoki & Hikaru Sato, Zeus called out for a shot at the Triple Crown Heavyweight Championship. On February 12, at the first day of the Jr.Battle Of Glory, Zeus lost to Kento Miyahara for the vacated Triple Crown Heavyweight Championship. On February 21, Zeus and Bodyguard retained the World Tag Team Championship against Nextream (Jake Lee and Kento Miyahara). From April 9 to April 24, Zeus participated in the 2016 Champion Carnival Zeus in block B. He finished his block with 10 points, losing only 1 match and advancing to the finals, where he lost to Daisuke Sekimoto. On June 15, Zeus and Bodyguard lost the World Tag Team title to Daisuke Sekimoto and Yuji Okabayashi. On November 27, Zeus and Bodyguard defeated Sekimoto and Okabayashi to regain the World Tag Team Championship. On May 21, 2017, they lost the titles to Kai and Kengo Mashimo, but managed to regain the titles in a rematch on June 11. However, they would lose the titles in their first defense to Nextream (Jake Lee and Naoya Nomura) on July 17. On February 25, 2018, they defeated Kento Miyahara and Yoshitatsu to win the titles for the fourth time, but lost them exactly one month later to Ryoji Sai and Dylan James. On July 29, Zeus once more challenged and defeated Kento Miyahara to finally capture the Triple Crown Heavyweight Championship. He made his first successful defense on August 26 against Shuji Ishikawa. However, he lost the title back to Miyahara on October 21 in his second defense.

== Personal life ==
Outside of professional wrestling, Obayashi is a bodybuilder and co-owner of "King Gym", a power and strength gym in Osaka, Japan with tag team partner and former bodybuilder Noboru Kurakawa.

== Championships and accomplishments ==
- All Japan Pro Wrestling
  - All Asia Tag Team Championship (1 time) – with Izanagi
  - Triple Crown Heavyweight Championship (1 time)
  - World Tag Team Championship (5 times) – with The Bodyguard (4) and Ryoji Sai (1)
  - Champion Carnival (2020)
- DDT Pro-Wrestling
  - Ironman Heavymetalweight Championship (1 time)
- Osaka Pro Wrestling
  - Osaka Pro Wrestling Championship (2 times)
  - Osaka Pro Wrestling Tag Team Championship (3 times) – with The Bodyguard (2) and Gaina (1)
  - Tennōzan (2013, 2023)
  - Osaka Tag Festival (2008) – with Daisuke Harada
  - Osaka Tag Festival (2013) – with Bodyguard
  - Osaka Tag Festival (2024) – with Tigers Mask
- Pro Wrestling Illustrated
  - Ranked No. 91 of the top 500 singles wrestlers in the PWI 500 in 2019
- Pro Wrestling Zero1
  - NWA United National Heavyweight Championship (1 time)
  - NWA Intercontinental Tag Team Championship (1 time) – with Masato Tanaka
  - Furinkazan (2012) – with James Raideen
