= Kuishinbo Kamen =

Japanese professional wrestler (born 1975)

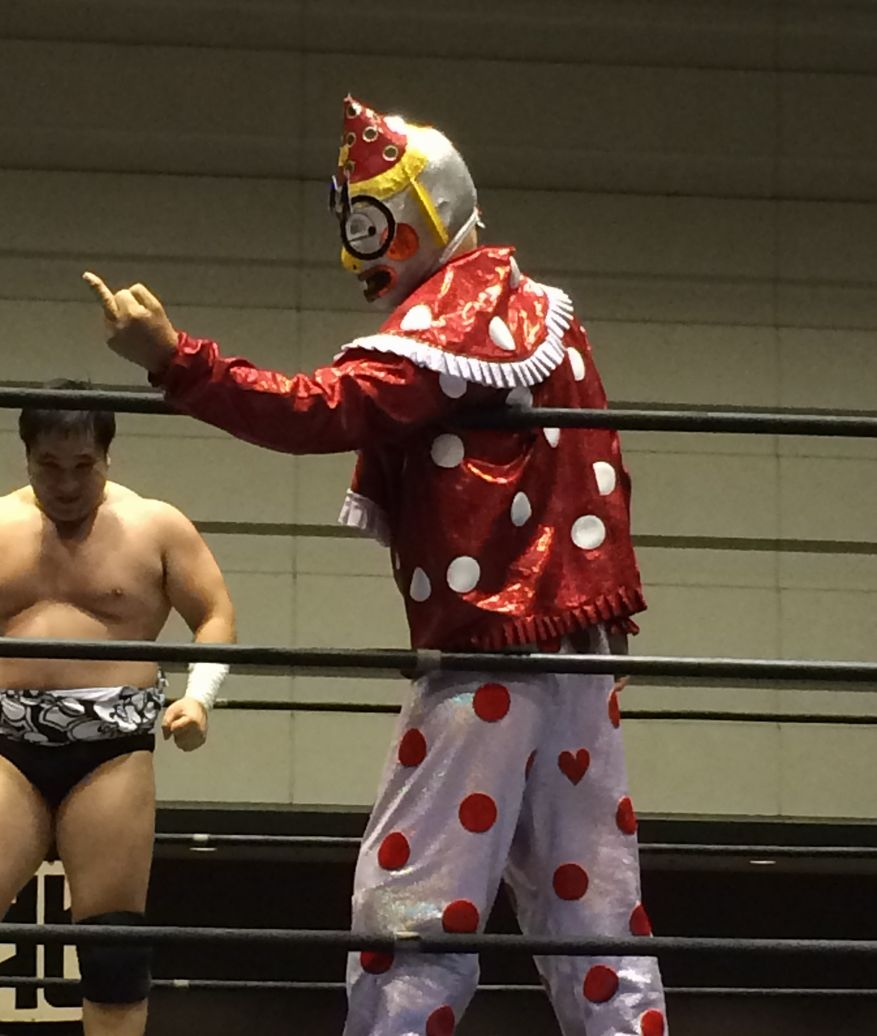
- Kuishinbo Kamen in 2014.

Personal information
- Born: Akinori Tsukioka; August 19, 1975 (age 50) Mima, Tokushima, Japan
- Website: Official Twitter

Professional wrestling career
- Ring name(s): Akinori Tsukioka; Super Robo K Kuishinbo Kamen
- Billed height: 182 cm (6 ft 0 in)
- Debut: 1999

Akinori Tsukioka (月岡 明則, Tsukioka Akinori; born August 19, 1975) is a Japanese professional wrestler better known as Kuishinbo Kamen (くいしんぼう仮面, Kuishinbō Kamen), a masked clown character. Kuishinbo Kamen is Japanese for "Gluttonous Mask". For a while he was forced to give up the Kuishinbo Kamen character, instead he worked as "Super Robo K", a futuristic Robot character, but returned to the Kuishinbo Kamen identity later on.

== Professional wrestling career ==
Tsukioka made his professional wrestling debut in 1999, working under his real name for International Wrestling Association of Japan for the first year of his career. When Tsukioka joined Osaka Pro Wrestling he adopted a masked clown gimmick, the comedic character "Kuishinbo Kamen" who wore a clown suit and even had a hat with yellow pom-poms attached to the mask. He quickly developed a storyline feud with another comedic masked wrestler known as Ebessan. Kamen defeated Ebessan to become the first ever holder of the Osaka Meibutsu Sekaiichi Championship (roughly translated into the "Osaka World's Best Attraction Championship"). On June 29, 2002 he became a double champion winning a battle royal to become the Osaka Pro Wrestling Battle Royal Champion). A title he would hold for a month and a half before losing it in another battle royal. February 2, 2003 Kurishinbo Kamen's feud with Ebessan hit its peak as Ebessan defeated Kurishinbo Kamen to win the Osaka Meibutsu Sekaiichi Championship, but more importantly the loss forced Tsukioka to give up the Kurishibo Kamen character. He would return to the ring a week later as ""Super Robo K", a robot gimmick completed with a more mechanical wrestling style. The character change only lasted for a couple of months before Kurishinbo Kamen returned to the ring. He regained the Meibutso Sekaiichi Championship on February 21, 2004 almost a year to the day he lost it. In March 2003 Kurishinbo Kamen and other Osaka Pro Wrestling representatives traveled to the United States of America, where they were part of the 2004 World X-Cup in TNA Wrestling. Kuishinbo Kamen teamed up with rival Ebessan and Nosawa, known as "Team Japan" losing to Chris Sabin, Elix Skipper and Sonjay Dutt who were part of "Team NWA". The group also worked a match for Revolution Pro Wrestling and Pro Wrestling Guerrilla before returning to Japan. Kurishinbo Kamen would hold the Battle Royal and the Meibutsu Sekaiichi several times in subsequent years. On June 6, 2010 Kamen teamed up with Ebessan III and Kanjyuro Matsuyama to defeat the team of Atsushi Kotoge, Daisuke Harada and Takoyakida to win the UWA World Trios Championship, holding it for six days before losing it to Tokyo Gurentai (Fujita, Mazada and Nosawa).

== Championships and accomplishments ==
- Dragon Gate
  - Open the Owarai Gate Championship (1 time)
- Dramatic Dream Team

- Ironman Heavymetalweight Championship (2 times)

- Osaka Pro Wrestling

- Osaka Meibutsu Sekaiichi Championship (5 times, first, current)
- Osaka Pro Wrestling Battle Royal Championship (4 times)
- Osaka Pro Wrestling Owarai Championship (2 times)
- UWA World Trios Championship (1 time) - with Ebessan (III) and Kanjyuro Matsuyama
- FM Osaka Cup 1 Day Six Man Tag Tournament (2009) - with Ebessan (III) and Kanjyuro Matsuyama
