= Takahiro Katori =

Japanese professional wrestler

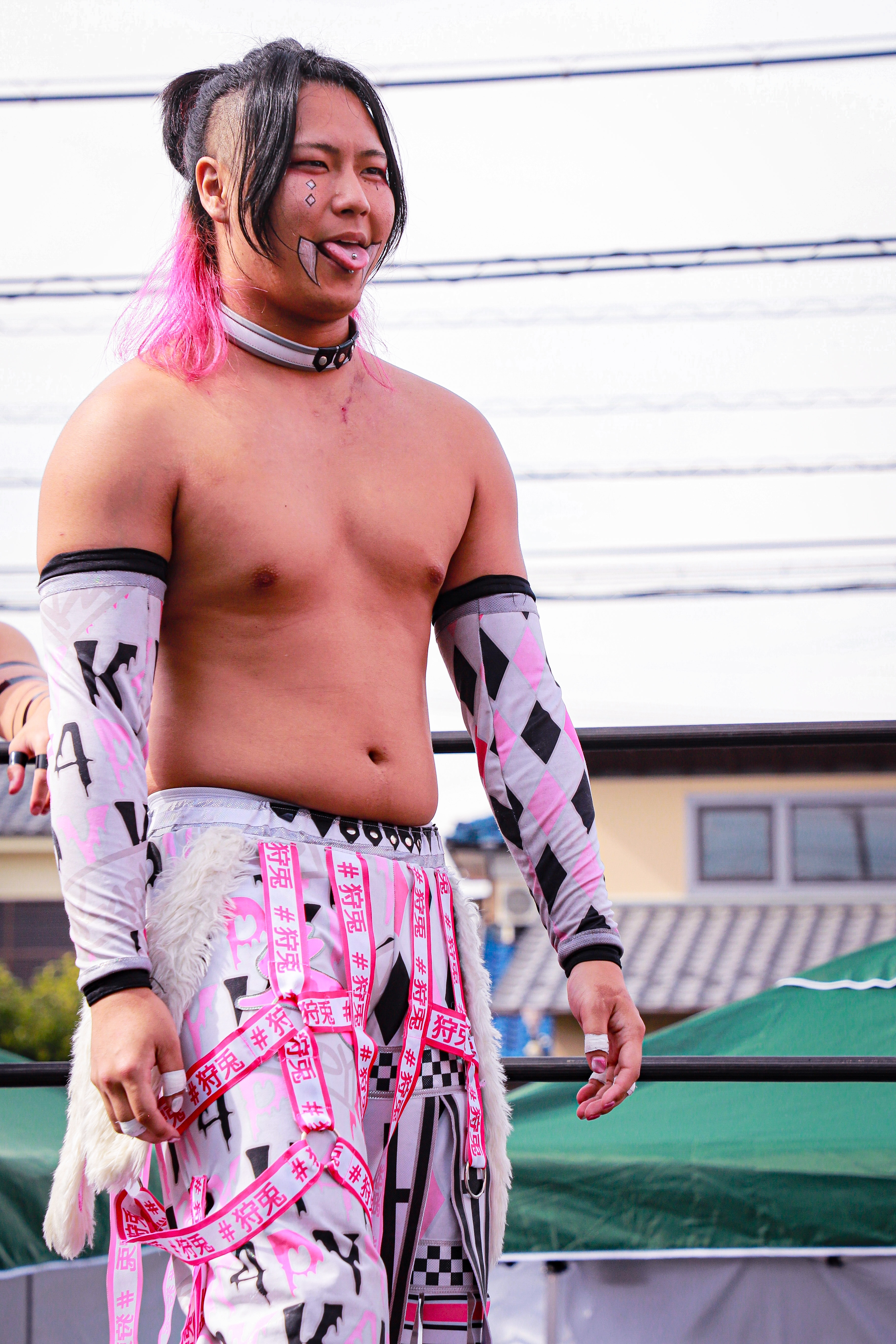
- Katori in July 2023

Personal information
- Born: 13 June 1999 (age 27) Koga, Japan

Professional wrestling career
- Ring names: K4py; Kapy; Takahiro Katori
- Billed height: 172 cm (5 ft 8 in)
- Billed weight: 76 kg (168 lb)
- Trained by: Kazunori Yoshida
- Debut: 2017

Takahiro Katori (香取貴大, Katori Takahiro) is a Japanese professional wrestler. He primarily competes in Pro Wrestling Freedoms, a Japanese professional wrestling promotion, and has also wrestled in other independent promotions.

== Professional wrestling career ==
=== Japanese independent circuit (2017–present) ===
In 2023, Katori made his first appearance in the Ryūkon Cup, a tournament held by independent puroresu promotion Tenryu Project. He was defeated by Naoki Tanizaki in the first round of the event. Katori's All Japan Pro Wrestling debut came on January 2, 2024 during the AJPW New Year Giant Series, where he competed in the a battle royal alongside Naruki Doi, Hideki Suzuki, Yuma Anzai, Yuma Aoyagi, and eventual winner Ryo Inoue.

==== Eagle Pro Wrestling (2017–present) ====
Katori made his professional wrestling debut in Eagle Pro Wrestling at EAGLE Koyama New Era, a house show held on May 28, 2017, where he lost his debut match to Taro Yamada in singles competition.

=== Pro Wrestling Freedoms (2017–present) ===
Katori made his Pro Wrestling Freedoms debut at FREEDOMS/Takashi Sasaki Produce Show, an event held on 26 December 2017, where he teamed up with Kazunori Yoshida and Hiroyuki Kondo to compete in the show's tag-team Country Battle Tournament. Katori, Yoshida and Kondo defeated Grandpa Sho Mask 4, Kengo Takai and Michio Kageyama in the first round, only to lose to Gurukun Mask, Hija Kidman and Ultra Soki in the semifinals.

Katori is a former King of Freedom World Junior Heavyweight Champion. He won the title on March 22, 2024 at The Gekokujō by defeating Jun Masaoka in singles competition. On September 15, 2024, Katori lost the title to Yuya Susumu at FREEDOMS 15th Anniversary.

During his Pro Wrestling Freedoms tenure, Katori has also competed for championships of other promotions. On December 25, 2023, Katori teamed up with Minoru Fujita and unsuccessfully challenged ERE (Kyu Mogami and Toshiyuki Sakuda) for the King of Freedom World Tag Team Championship at FREEDOMS/Jun Kasai Produce Blood X'Mas.

=== New Japan Pro Wrestling (2023) ===
Katori briefly competed in New Japan Pro Wrestling as a developmental talent. On July 4, 2023, he made an appearance at the NJPW Independence Day event, where he teamed up with Dragon Libre and Kengo and lost to Oskar Leube, Yoh and Ryusuke Taguchi. The following day, he joined Libre and Rekka in a losing effort against Ryusuke Taguchi, Master Wato and Boltin Oleg. On October 9, 2023, during the second night of Destruction in Ryogoku, Katori formed a team with Takeshi Masada, Kazuma Sumi, Kengo, and Jun Masaoka. The team lost to Chaos (Yoshi-Hashi, Toru Yano and Yoh), Tiger Mask and Ryusuke Taguchi.

== Championships and accomplishments ==
- Pro Wrestling Freedoms
  - King of Freedom World Junior Heavyweight Championship (1 time)
