= Tetsuya Izuchi =

Japanese professional wrestler

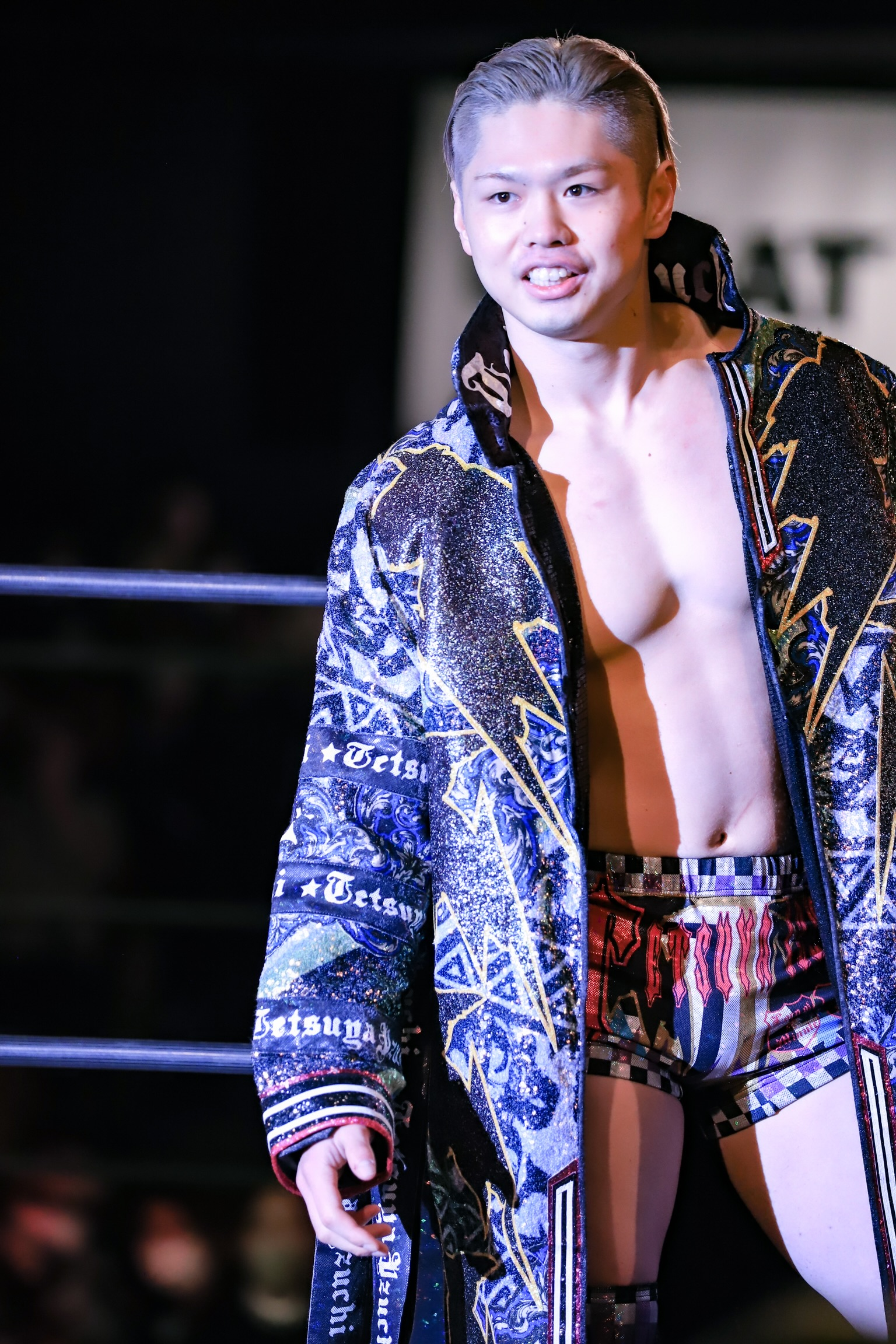
- Izuchi in February 2023

Personal information
- Born: 16 February 2000 (age 26) Tokyo, Japan

Professional wrestling career
- Ring name: Tetsuya Izuchi
- Billed height: 180 cm (5 ft 11 in)
- Billed weight: 95 kg (209 lb)
- Trained by: Kazuhiro Tamura; Hiroshi Watanabe
- Debut: 2016

Tetsuya Izuchi (井土徹也, Izuchi Tetsuya) is a Japanese professional wrestler and mixed martial artist currently signed to Gleat, where he is a former G-Infinity Champion and a member of Black Generation International. He is also known for his tenure with Pro Wrestling Heat Up.

== Professional wrestling career ==
=== Japanese independent circuit (2016–present) ===
On the first night of the AJPW Summer Action Series 2019 on July 17, 2019, Izuchi competed in a number-one contendership battle royal for the Gaora TV Championship. The match was won by Toru Matsunaga and also featured notable opponents such as Psycho and Survival Tobita. Izuchi competed in the 2020 edition of All Japan Pro Wrestling's AJPW Junior Tag League alongside Yu Iizuka, where they were eliminated by Evolution (Dan Tamura and Hikaru Sato) in the first round. At 2AW Grand Slam In Korakuen Hall, a house show promoted by Active Advance Pro Wrestling on March 26, 2023, he unsuccessfully challenged Ayato Yoshida for the 2AW Openweight Championship.

=== Pro Wrestling Heat Up (2016–present) ===
Izuchi made his professional wrestling debut in Pro Wrestling Heat Up at HEAT UP The Light Of Hope That Illuminates Kawasaki ~ Make A Miracle Happen 2016 on October 31, where he teamed with Yuu Iizuka and Fuminori Abe in a losing effort against Kenichiro Arai, Masahiro Takanashi, and Leona in six-man tag team competition. During his time with the promotion, Izuchi won the Heat Up Universal Tag Team Championship on two separate occasions alongside Daisuke Kanehira.

=== Gleat (2021–present) ===
Izuchi made his debut in Gleat at Gleat Ver. 1 on July 1, 2021, where he teamed with Daijiro Matsui to defeat Minoru Tanaka and Soma Watanabe in an UWF Rules match. Izuchi competes in both professional wrestling and mixed martial arts bouts, as Gleat promotes both types of sports. At Gleat MMA Ver.0 on December 14, 2022, he fell short to Yuki Kondo via decision in the main event.

During his time with the promotion, Izuchi pursued various championships. At GLEAT Ver. 3 ~ 1st Anniversary on July 1, 2022, he unsuccessfully challenged El Lindaman for the G-Rex Championship. At Gleat Ver. 53 on May 21, 2023, he teamed with "60 Seconds" stablemate Jun Tonsho to unsuccessfully challenge Bulk Orchestra (Check Shimatani and Hayato Tamura) for the G-Infinity Championship. One month later at GLEAT Ver. EX Face-Off on July 1, 2023, Izuchi teamed with stablemates Jun Tonsho and Keiichi Sato in a losing effort against Bulk Orchestra's Check Shimatani, Hayato Tamura, Kazma Sakamoto, and Ryuichi Kawakami in a losing unit must disband match. As a result, Izuchi's stable, "60 Seconds", officially disbanded. In May 2024, he joined the villainous stable "Black Generation International". At Gleat Ver.12 on July 1, 2024, he teamed with stablemate Kaito Ishida and defeated Coelacanths (Cima and Kaz Hayashi) to win the G-Infinity Championship. They dropped the titles to The Rascalz (Zachary Wentz and Trey Miguel) at Gleat Ver. Mega in Osaka on October 6, 2024.

== Mixed martial arts record ==
Professional record breakdown
2 matches	0 wins	2 losses
By decision	0	2

Res.	Record	Opponent	Method	Event	Date	Round	Time	Location	Notes
Loss	0–2	Akihiro Gono	Decision (unanimous)	Gleat Ver.Mega	August 4, 2023	3	5:00	Tokyo, Japan	
Loss	0–1	Yuki Kondo	Decision (unanimous)	Gleat MMA Ver.0	December 14, 2022	3	5:00	Tokyo, Japan	

Amateur record breakdown		
5 matches	5 wins	0 losses
By decision	5	0

Res.	Record	Opponent	Method	Event	Date	Round	Time	Location	Notes
Win	5–0	Keinosuke Yoshinaga	Decision (split)	Breaking Down 4	March 21, 2022	1	1:00	Tokyo, Japan	
Win	4–0	Takahito Maruta	Decision (split)	Breaking Down 3	November 27, 2021	1	1:00	Tokyo, Japan	
Win	3–0	Lindaman	Decision (unanimous)	Breaking Down 3	November 27, 2021	1	1:00	Tokyo, Japan	
Win	2–0	Junya Tokai	Decision (unanimous)	Breaking Down 3	November 27, 2021	1	1:00	Tokyo, Japan	
Win	1–0	Minechika Matsumoto	Decision (split)	Breaking Down 2	September 26, 2021	1	1:00	Tokyo, Japan	

== Championships and accomplishments ==
=== Mixed martial arts ===
- Breaking Down
  - Breaking Down Middleweight Championship (1 time, inaugural)

=== Professional wrestling ===
- Gleat
  - G-Infinity Championship (1 time) – with Kaito Ishida
- Pro Wrestling Heat Up
  - Heat Up Universal Tag Team Championship (2 times) – with Daisuke Kanehira
