= United National Tag Team Championship =

Professional wrestling tag team championship

Tenryu Project United National Heavyweight Tag Team Championship
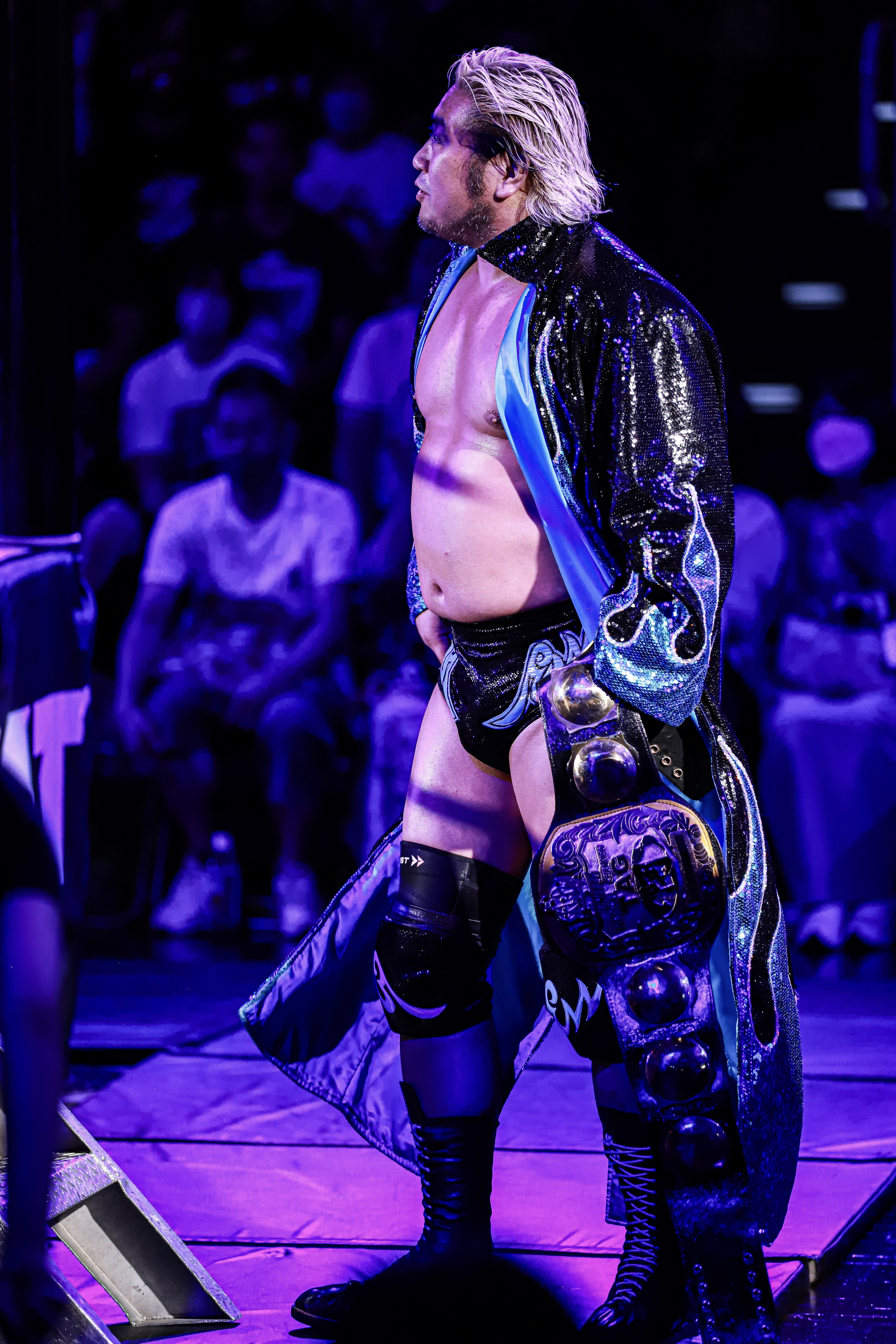
- Suwama with one of the belts in August 2023

Details
- Promotion: Tenryu Project (2023–present)
- Date established: April 19, 2023
- Current champions: Koji Iwamoto and Hideyoshi Kamitani
- Date won: December 20, 2025
Statistics
- First champions: Yuma Aoyagi and Atsuki Aoyagi
- Longest reign: Kohei Sato and Masayuki Kono (431 days)
- Shortest reign: Yuma Aoyagi and Atsuki Aoyagi (36 days)
- Oldest champion: Suwama (46 years, 235 days)
- Youngest champion: Atsuki Aoyagi (23 years, 185 days)
- Heaviest champion: Suwama (264 lbs)
- Lightest champion: Atsuki Aoyagi (176 lbs)

The Tenryu Project United National Heavyweight Tag Team Championship (Japanese: 天龍プロジェクト認定ユナイテッドナショナル・ヘビー級タッグ王座, Hepburn: Tenryū Purojekuto Nintei Yunaiteddo Nashonaru Hebī-kyū Taggu Ōza) is a professional wrestling tag team championship contested for in the Japanese promotion Tenryu Project. This title is the first championship in Tenryu Project that is not revived from Wrestle Association-R. It is also referred to as the UN Tag Team Championship (UNタッグ王座, UN Taggu Ōza) for short. The title matches are fought under PWF rules.

== History ==
The title was created in April 2023 with the approval of All Japan Pro Wrestling (AJPW) and Dory Funk Jr., chairman of the Pacific Wrestling Federation (PWF), the governing body for AJPW's championships. It was created to honor the career of Genichiro Tenryu, who held the NWA United National Championship twice before it was unified into the Triple Crown Heavyweight Championship. The title matches are held under classic PWF rules, with all matches being 2-out-of-3 falls with a 60-minute time limit.

=== Inaugural tournament ===
On June 10, 2023, a one-day, four-team tournament was held at the GEN Sports Palace in Shinjuku, Tokyo, to crown the inaugural champions. The Aoyagi brothers, Yuma and Atsuki, representing AJPW and their stable Zennichi Shin Jidai (Note: Japanese: 全日新時代, Hepburn: Zennichi Shinjidai; lit. New Era of All Japan), ended up victorious.

Round 1
Masayuki Kono and Yusuke Kodama	Pin
Hideyoshi Kamitani and Kazumasa Yoshida	10:35
Kohei Sato and Sushi	9:02
Yuma Aoyagi and Atsuki Aoyagi	Pin

Final
Masayuki Kono and Yusuke Kodama	16:30
Yuma Aoyagi and Atsuki Aoyagi	Pin

=== Belt design ===
The Tenryu Project United National Heavyweight Tag Team Championship belts are almost exact replicas of the old NWA United National Championship singles belt, originally made in 1970 and retired from use for the Triple Crown since 2013. They feature the same six side plates on a black leather strap. In the center plate, the word "TAG" has been added between the "UNITED NATIONAL CHAMPION" inscription and the globe. Instead of a red leather background, one of the belt has a yellow background, while the other has a blue background. Instead of a depiction of two grapplers, the globe features a kanji in black enamel; the yellow belt reads "阿" while the blue belt reads "呍". Together, these kanji form the word A-un (阿呍, aun; although the spelling 阿吽 is more common). In Japanese Buddhism, it is the syllable that represents the primordial trinity of Vishnu, Shiva, and Brahma, and is similar to the idea of the "Alpha and Omega".

== Reigns ==
As of June 17, 2026, there have been a total of five reigns shared among five different teams consisting of ten distinctive wrestlers. The current champions are Koji Iwamoto and Hideyoshi Kamitani who are in their first reign as a team.

Key
No.	Overall reign number
Reign	Reign number for the specific team—reign numbers for the individuals are in parentheses, if different
Days	Number of days held
Defenses	Number of successful defenses
+	Current reign is changing daily

No.	Champion	Championship change			Reign statistics			Notes	Ref.
No.	Champion	Date	Event	Location	Reign	Days	Defenses	Notes	Ref.
Tenryu Project
1	Zennichi Shin Jidai (Yuma Aoyagi and Atsuki Aoyagi)	June 10, 2023	Tenryu Project UN Tag Team Inaugural Championship 1 Day Tournament	Tokyo, Japan	1	36	1	Defeated Masayuki Kono and Yusuke Kodama in the final of a four-team tournament to win the inaugural title.	
2	Evolution (Suwama and Dan Tamura)	July 16, 2023	Summer Action Series 2023	Tokyo, Japan	1	126	3	This was an All Japan Pro Wrestling event.	
3	Hikaru Sato and Hideki Suzuki	November 19, 2023	Ryūkon Cup III: Live For Today	Tokyo, Japan	1	331	3		
4	Kohei Sato and Masayuki Kono	October 15, 2024	Light My Fire Vol. 7	Tokyo, Japan	1	431	4		
5	Koji Iwamoto and Hideyoshi Kamitani	December 20, 2025	Tenryu Genichiro Triple Year Crowdfunding Event (2nd Session, Evening)	Tokyo, Japan	1	179+	1		

== Combined reigns ==
As of June 17, 2026.

†	Indicates the current champion

=== By team ===
Rank	Team	No. of reigns	Combined defenses	Combined days
1	Kohei Sato and Masayuki Kono	1	4	431
2	Hikaru Sato and Hideki Suzuki	1	3	331
3	Koji Iwamoto and Hideyoshi Kamitani †	1	1	179+
4	Evolution (Suwama and Dan Tamura)	1	3	126
5	Zennichi Shin Jidai (Yuma Aoyagi and Atsuki Aoyagi)	1	1	36

=== By wrestler ===
Rank	Wrestler	No. of reigns	Combined defenses	Combined days
1	Kohei Sato	1	4	431
1	Masayuki Kono	1	4	431
3	Hikaru Sato	1	3	331
3	Hideki Suzuki	1	3	331
5	Koji Iwamoto †	1	1	179+
5	Hideyoshi Kamitani †	1	1	179+
7	Suwama	1	3	126
7	Dan Tamura	1	3	126
9	Atsuki Aoyagi	1	1	36
9	Yuma Aoyagi	1	1	36

== See also ==
- Tenryu Project International Junior Heavyweight Championship
- World Heavyweight Tag Team Championship
- NWA United National Championship
