= Yu Iizuka =

Japanese wrestler (born 1996)

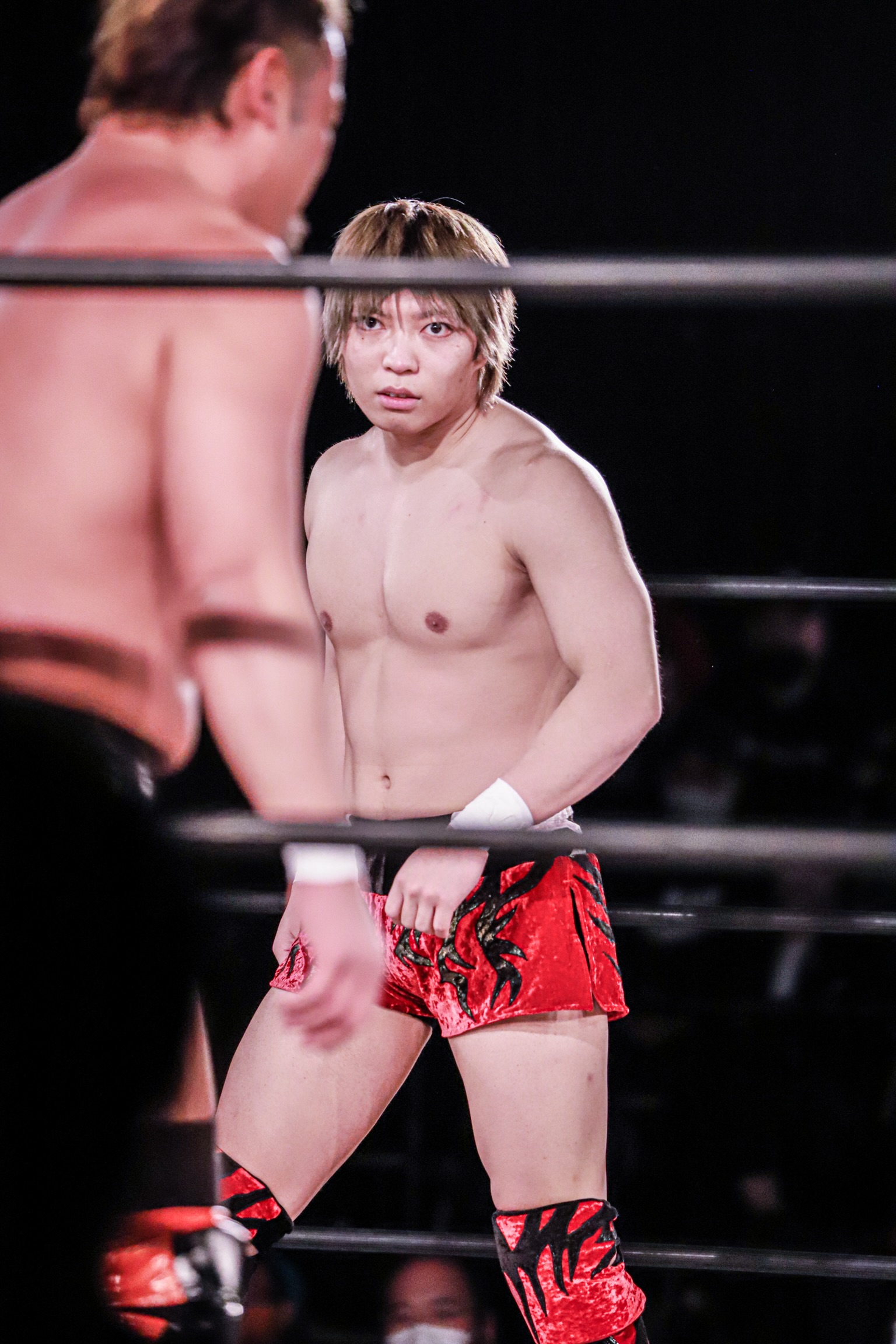
- Iizuka in January 2022

Personal information
- Born: 11 October 1996 (age 30) Tokyo, Japan

Professional wrestling career
- Ring name: Yu Iizuka
- Billed height: 170 cm (5 ft 7 in)
- Billed weight: 75 kg (165 lb)
- Trained by: Kazuhiro Tamura; Hiroshi Watanabe; Kiyoshi Tamura; Kaz Hayashi
- Debut: 2016

Yu Iizuka
- Born: Yu Iizuka; October 11, 1996 (age 30); Tokyo, Japan
- Native name: 飯塚優
- Nationality: Japanese
- Height: 1.68 m (5 ft 6 in)
- Weight: 75 kg (165 lb; 11.8 st)
- Division: Lightweight
- Fighting out of: Tokyo, Japan
- Team: Heat Up
- Years active: 2020–2022

Mixed martial arts record
- Total: 4
- Wins: 1
- By knockout: 1
- Losses: 3
- By submission: 3

Yu Iizuka (飯塚優, Iizuka Yu) is a Japanese professional wrestler and former mixed martial artist signed to the Japanese promotion Gleat. He is also known for his tenures with various promotions from the Japanese independent scene such as Pro Wrestling Heat Up.

== Professional wrestling career ==
=== Japanese independent circuit (2016–present) ===
Iizuka made his professional wrestling debut in Pro Wrestling Heat Up at Dream-Up ~ Days Of Youth on July 21, 2016, where he fell short to one of his coaches Hiroshi Watanabe in singles competition. He spent roughly five years in the promotions and was active in various signature events such as the Burning King and Powerful Tag Tournaments. On December 24, 2020, the promotion officially announced that he would be leaving at the end of the year due to the expiration of his contract with the company. His last match took place at Heat Up Dentetsu on December 25, 2020, where he fell short to Tetsuya Izuchi.

Iizuka competed in the 2017 edition of Kaientai Dojo's K-METAL League, where he scored a total of two points in the only block after competing against Yuki Ueno, Kyu Mogami, Go Asakawa and Marines Mask. At Josh Barnett's Bloodsport: Bushido on June 22, 2024, Iizuka fell short to Fuminori Abe via submission.

=== All Japan Pro Wrestling (2020–2023) ===
Iizuka sporadically competed in All Japan Pro Wrestling as a developmental talent. He made his debut in the promotion in the 2020 edition of the AJPW Junior Tag League where he teamed up with Tetsuya Izuchi and fell short to Evolution (Dan Tamura and Hikaru Sato) in the first rounds. One year later at the 2021 edition of the tournament, Iizuka teamed up with Atsuki Aoyagi and defeated Takayuki Ueki and Seigo Tachibana in the first rounds, only to fall short again to Sato and Tamura in the next stage.

=== Gleat (2021–present) ===
Iizuka made his debut in Gleat at GLEAT Experimental Match 4th #2 on March 11, 2021, where he defeated Soma Watanabe in the semifinals of an UWF Rules tournament.

During his time with the promotion, he chased for various accomplishments. He competed in the inaugural tournament of the G-Rex Championship in which he defeated Kaz Hayashi in the first rounds, then fell short to Hayato Tamura in the second. Iizuka also competed in the inaugural tournament of the Lidet UWF World Championship in which he defeated Minoru Tanaka in the first rounds, then fell short to Takanori Ito in the second rounds at G Prowrestling Ver.49 on April 12, 2023. At G Prowrestling Ver.33 on September 10, 2022, he teamed up with Soma Watanabe to unsuccessfully challenge Voodoo Murders (Minoru and Toshizo) for the All Asia Tag Team Championship. At G Prowrestling Ver.63 on November 3, 2023, Iizuka teamed up with Tetsuya Izuchi and fell short to Bulk Orchestra (Kazma Sakamoto and Quiet Storm in a number one contendership tournament for the G-Infinity Championship.

== Championships and accomplishments ==
=== Grappling ===
- IMPACT NOGI Openweight Championship (2nd)

== Submission grappling record ==
On September 21st, he entered the "5th THE NEXT CONTENDERS tournament" held at NicoPro presents Hard Hit "Tokyo Grappling March". In the first round, he defeated Tatsuya Hanami of K-DOJO (armbar), and in the second round, he defeated Tomoya Omura of Toshin (headscissors armlock) to advance to the final. His main rival in the final was Tetsuya Izuchi, a junior from the same gym (Pro Wrestling HEAT-UP) with whom he had a bonding since his days at Animal Hamaguchi's Gym. Immediately after the gong for the final match rang, he countered Ido's tackle with a front choke, winning the tournament in a lightning-fast 42 seconds.

On September 22, 2019, at Masamune's independent show "Purple Beard One Eye," he was challenged by the show's producer, Masamune, to a singles match. He lost in 16 minutes and 16 seconds by a figure-four leglock. As a prize for winning the 5th THE NEXT CONTENDERS tournament, he requested a match against Mitsuya Nagai, a former member of RINGS Japan, an organization he admired. The match took place at the December 30 tournament, but he was soundly defeated in 2 minutes and 36 seconds.

Result	Opponent	Method	Event	Date	Round	Time
Loss	(Japan) Kenichi Ito	Submission (heel hook)	ZST 67	January 26, 2020	1	2:57
Loss	(Japan) Daisuke Matsumoto	Submission (armlock)	ZST Battle Hazard 07	August 30, 2020	1	7:41
Win	(Brazil) Rodrigo Anraku	TKO (ground and pound)	Chakuriki 13	September 23, 2021	1	4:59
Loss	(Japan) Daisuke Nakamura	Submission (arm triangle choke)	Gleat MMA Ver.0	December 14, 2022	1	6:06
