= Gleat MMA Ver.0 =

Combat sport events in 2022

- Promotion: Gleat
- Date: December 14, 2022
- Venue: Korakuen Hall
- City: Tokyo, Japan
- Attendance: 438

Gleat MMA Ver.0 was the first combat sport event produced by Lidet Entertainment via the Gleat promotion. It took place on December 14, 2022, at the Korakuen Hall in Tokyo, Japan.

== Background ==
Gleat MMA Ver.0 was the first mixed martial arts event of the professional wrestling promotion Gleat. The promotion was founded by the Japanese advertising company Lidet Entertainment after producing several events for Tokyo Gurentai, DDT Pro-Wrestling, Lucha Libre AAA Worldwide, Riki Choshu and Shiro Koshinaka in the late 2010s. In 2019, Lidet acquired 75% of the shares of Pro Wrestling Noah with the aim of reinvigorating the promotion. However, due to financial difficulties, Lidet sold all of its shares to CyberAgent a year later. Several days after the sale, Lidet President Hiroyuki Suzuki met with Kiyoshi Tamura, and later announced the formation of a brand new promotion called Gleat.

The promotion focuses on puroresu and shoot-style wrestling, dividing its roster and events between a traditional pro-wrestling brand called "G Prowrestling" and a shoot-style brand inspired by UWF International called "Lidet UWF". On September 19, 2022, Gleat officially announced the creation of a third brand – called "Gleat MMA" – dedicated to promoting legitimate mixed martial arts events. The first event was held at the Korakuen Hall on December 14, and titled Gleat MMA Ver.0.

The event showcased a total of seven matches, including three MMA, two kickboxing and two grappling matches. Hikaru Sato had to withdraw from his scheduled fight against Taisei due to a back injury sustained at a Tenryu Project event on December 11. The main event featured former Openweight King of Pancrase, Yuki Kondo, facing off against 22-year-old Gleat pro-wrestler Tetsuya Izuchi in his first professional MMA bout. Ultimately, Kondo won by unanimous decision. In the semi-main event, Takuya Wada, the former Welterweight King of Pancrase, defeated Minoru Tanaka, a veteran junior heavyweight pro-wrestler, by technical knockout.

== Results ==
Main card
Weight class				Method	Round	Time	Notes
Catchweight (161 lb)	Yuki Kondo	def.	Tetsuya Izuchi	Decision (unanimous) (29–28, 30–27, 30–27)	3	5:00
Openweight	Takuya Wada	def.	Minoru Tanaka	TKO (punches and elbows)	1	1:37
Openweight	Hideki Sekine	def.	Dan Tamura	Decision (unanimous) (10–9, 10–9, 10–9)	1	10:00	(Note: Grappling bout.)
Catchweight (165 lb)	Daisuke Nakamura	def.	Yu Iizuka	Submission (arm-triangle choke)	1	6:06	(Note: Grappling bout.)
Catchweight (101 lb)	Minori Kikuchi	def.	Maya Fukuda	Decision (split) (30–29, 29–30, 28–29)	3	3:00	(Note: Kickboxing bout.)
Catchweight (165 lb)	Shuya Arimura	def.	Soma Watanabe	Decision (unanimous) (30–25, 30–25, 30–24)	3	3:00	(Note: Kickboxing bout.)
Strawweight	Toru Sakakibara	def.	Nobuya Hasegawa	Submission (triangle choke)	1	1:10

== See also ==
- Gleat
