= Noah Apex Conquest 2026 =

2026 Pro Wrestling Noah event

NOAH Apex Conquest 2026 (Night 1)
- Promotional poster featuring Yoshiki Inamura and Kenoh
- Promotion: CyberFight
- Brand: Pro Wrestling Noah
- Date: March 8, 2026
- City: Yokohama, Japan
- Venue: Yokohama Budokan
- Attendance: 1,904

Pay-per-view chronology
← Previous; Legacy Rise 2026	Next → Apex Conquest (Night 2)

NOAH Apex Conquest 2026 was a multiple-night professional wrestling event promoted by CyberFight's sub-brand Pro Wrestling Noah. The pay-per-view nights of the event took place on March 8, 2026, in Yokohama, at the Yokohama Budokan, and on April 12, 2026, in Nagoya, at the Kinjofuto Arena. Both of the events were broadcast on CyberAgent's AbemaTV online linear television service and CyberFight's streaming service Wrestle Universe.

The card comprised a total of 16 matches, with eight on both nights. In the main event for Night 1, Yoshiki Inamura defeated Kenoh to retain the GHC Heavyweight Championship. In the main event for Night 2, Inamura defeated Alpha Wolf to retain the title.

== Background ==
=== Storylines ===
The event featured eleven professional wrestling matches that resulted from scripted storylines, where wrestlers portrayed villains, heroes, or less distinguishable characters in the scripted events that built tension and culminated in a wrestling match or series of matches.

== Night 1 ==
=== Event ===
The event started with the six-man tag team confrotation between the team of Atsushi Kotoge, Hajime Ohara and Mohammed Yone, and the team of Manabu Soya, Midori Takahashi and Shuhei Taniguchi, solded with the victory of the latters.

Next up, Alpha Wolf, Jun Masaoka, Kai Fujimura and Tadasuke picked up a victory over Black Menso-re, Eita, Katsumi Inahata and Kieron Lacey in eight-man tag team competition. The third bout saw Hiroto Tsuruya and Naomichi Marufuji outmatching Angel Reyes and Ryusei in tag team competition. Next up, Knull, Masa Kitamiya, Ozawa and Takashi Sugiura defeated Hayata, Kenta, Tetsuya Endo and Yuto Koyonagi in eight-man tag team competition. In the fifth bout, Kaito Kiyomiya defeated Galeno in singles competition. Next up, 2026 Global Junior Heavyweight Tag League winners Alejandro and Dragon Bane defeated Daga and Daiki Odashima to win the GHC Junior Heavyweight Championship, ending the latter team's reign at 148 days and two defenses. In the semi main event, Amakusa defeated Mark Trew to secure the second consecutive defense of the GHC Junior Heavyweight Championship in that respective reign.

In the main event, Yoshiki Inamura defeated Kenoh to secure the fifth consecutive defense of the GHC Heavyweight Championship in that respective reign. After the bout concluded, Inamura was furtherly challenged by GHC National Champion Alpha Wolf.

=== Results ===
No.	Results	Stipulations	Times
1	Team Noah (Atsushi Kotoge, Hajime Ohara and Mohammed Yone) defeated Manabu Soya, Midori Takahashi and Shuhei Taniguchi by pinfall	Six-man tag team match	7:31
2	Team 2000X (Alpha Wolf, Jun Masaoka, Kai Fujimura and Tadasuke) defeated Black Menso-re, Eita, Katsumi Inahata and Kieron Lacey by pinfall	Eight-man tag team match	6:43
3	Hiroto Tsuruya and Naomichi Marufuji defeated Los Tranquilos de Japon (Angel Reyes and Ryusei) by pinfall	Tag team match	8:53
4	Team 2000X (Knull, Masa Kitamiya, Ozawa and Takashi Sugiura) defeated White Raven Squad (Hayata, Kenta and Tetsuya Endo) and Yuto Koyonagi by pinfall	Eight-man tag team match	9:10
5	Kaito Kiyomiya defeated Galeno by pinfall	Singles match	9:35
6	Alejandro and Dragon Bane defeated Los Intocables (Daga and Daiki Odashima) (c) by pinfall	Tag team match for the GHC Junior Heavyweight Tag Team Championship	17:52
7	Amakusa (c) defeated Mark Trew by pinfall	Singles match for the GHC Junior Heavyweight Championship	12:10
8	Yoshiki Inamura (c) defeated Kenoh by pinfall	Singles match for the GHC Heavyweight Championship	21:59
(c) / – the champion(s) heading into the match

== Night 2 ==
NOAH Apex Conquest 2026 (Night 2)
- Promotional poster featuring Yoshiki Inamura and Alpha Wolf
- Promotion: CyberFight
- Brand: Pro Wrestling Noah
- Date: April 12, 2026
- City: Nagoya, Japan
- Venue: Kinjofuto Arena
- Attendance: 1,280

Pay-per-view chronology
← Previous; Apex Conquest (Night 1)	Next → Spring Mayhem

=== Event ===
The event started with the six-man tag team confrontation between the team of Black Menso-re, Manabu Soya and Yuto Koyanagi, and the team of Daiki Odashima, Hajime Ohara and Midori Takahashi, solded with the victory of the latters.

Next up, Angel Reyes and Ryusei picked up a victory over the team of Eita and Hiroto Tsuruya in tag team competition. The third bout saw Kai Fujimura, Knull and Tadasuke defeat Atsushi Kotoge, Hi69 and Mohammed Yone in six-man tag team competition. Next up, Amakusa, Kenoh and Naomichi Marufuji outmatched Katsumi Inahata, Hayata and Tetsuya Endo in another six-man tag team bout. In the fifth match, Masa Kitamiya and Takashi Sugiura picked up a victory over Harutoki and Kaito Kiyomiya in tag team competition. Next up, Alejandro and Dragon Bane defeated Kid Lykos and Kid Lykos II to secure the first successful defense of the GHC Junior Heavyweight Tag Team Championship in that respective reign. After the bout concluded, Bane called out Amakusa and challenged him for the GHC Junior Heavyweight Championship in a match which took place at Spring Mayhem on May 2, 2026, three weeks later. In the semi main event, Tetsuya Naito and Bushi defeated Jun Masaoka and Ozawa to secure the third consecutive defense of the GHC Tag Team Championship in that respective reign. After the bout concluded, Ozawa challenged Naito to an all-out battle three weeks later at Spring Mayhem on May 2, 2026.

In the main event, Yoshiki Inamura defeated Alpha Wolf to secure the sixth consecutive defense of the GHC Heavyweight Championship in rhat respective reign. After the bout concluded, Shane Haste stormed the ring wearing a White Raven Squad t-shirt, hinting him joining the latter stable and layed a title challenge to Inamura in a match which took place at Spring Mayhem on May 2, 2026.

=== Results ===
No.	Results	Stipulations	Times
1	Daiki Odashima, Hajime Ohara and Midori Takahashi defeated Black Menso-re, Manabu Soya and Yuto Koyanagi	Six-man tag team match	7:55
2	Los Tranquilos de Japon (Angel Reyes and Ryusei) defeated Eita and Hiroto Tsuruya	Tag team match	4:45
3	Team 2000X (Kai Fujimura, Knull and Tadasuke) defeated Team Noah (Atsushi Kotoge, Hi69 and Mohammed Yone)	Six-man tag team match	3:22
4	Amakusa, Kenoh and Naomichi Marufuji defeated Katsumi Inahata and White Raven Squad (Hayata and Tetsuya Endo)	Six-man tag team match	6:43
5	Team 2000X (Masa Kitamiya and Takashi Sugiura) defeated All Rebellion (Harutoki and Kaito Kiyomiya)	Tag team match	12:06
6	Alejandro and Dragon Bane (c) defeated Lykos Gym (Kid Lykos and Kid Lykos II)	Tag team match for the GHC Junior Heavyweight Tag Team Championship	12:39
7	Los Tranquilos de Japon (Tetsuya Naito and Bushi) (c) defeated Team 2000X (Jun Masaoka and Ozawa)	Tag team match for the GHC Tag Team Championship	19:03
8	Yoshiki Inamura (c) defeated Alpha Wolf	Singles match for the GHC Heavyweight Championship	22:53
(c) / – the champion(s) heading into the match
