= Noah Spring Mayhem =

2026 Pro Wrestling Noah event

NOAH Spring Mayhem
- Promotional poster featuring various wrestlers
- Promotion: CyberFight
- Brand: Pro Wrestling Noah
- Date: May 2, 2026
- City: Tokyo, Japan
- Venue: Ryogoku Kokugikan
- Attendance: 4,539

Pay-per-view chronology
← Previous; Apex Conquest	Next → Legacy Rise 2026 (Night 2)

NOAH Spring Mayhem was a professional wrestling event promoted by CyberFight's sub-brand Pro Wrestling Noah and took place on May 2, 2026, in Tokyo, Japan, at the Ryogoku Kokugikan. It was broadcast on CyberAgent's AbemaTV online linear television service and CyberFight's streaming service Wrestle Universe.

Eleven matches were contested at the event, including four during the pre-show, and two of Noah's seven championships were on the line. The main event saw Shane Haste defeat Yoshiki Inamura to win the GHC Heavyweight Championship. In another prominent match, Dragon Bane defeated Amakusa to win the GHC Junior Heavyweight Championship.

== Background ==
=== Storylines ===
The event featured eleven professional wrestling matches that resulted from scripted storylines, where wrestlers portrayed villains, heroes, or less distinguishable characters in the scripted events that built tension and culminated in a wrestling match or series of matches.

=== Event ===
The event started with four preshow bouts. The first one portrayed the six-man tag team confrontation between Hiroto Tsuruya, Midori Takahashi and Yuto Koyanagi, and the team of Atsushi Kotoge, Hajime Ohara and Hi69, solded with the victory of the latters. In the second one, Eita picked up a victory over Katsumi Inahata in singles competition. Next up, Hayata, Kenta and Tetsuya Endo outmatched Daiki Odashima, Kazuyuki Fujita and Mohammed Yone in six-man tag team competition. In the last preshow match, Knull defeated Kid Lykos and Kid Lykos II in two-on-one handicap competition.

In the first main card bout, Manabu Soya, Saxon Huxley and Yuki Iino picked up a victory over the teams of Alejandro, Harutoki and Kaito Kiyomiya, and Masa Kitamiya, Tadasuke and Takashi Sugiura in three-way tag team competition. Next up, Alpha Wolf and Kai Fujimura defeated Angel Reyes and Ryusei in tag team competition. The seventh bout of the event saw Bushi defeat Jun Masaoka in singles competition. Next up, Kenoh and Naomichi Marufuji defeated Doc Gallows and Karl Anderson in tag team competition. Next up, Ozawa defeated Tetsuya Naito. In the semi main event, Dragon Bane defeated Amakusa to win the GHC Junior Heavyweight Championship, ending the latter's reign at 121 days and two defenses.

In the main event, Shane Haste defeated Yoshiki Inamura to win the GHC Heavyweight Championship, ending the latter's reign at 175 days and six defenses.

== Results ==
No.	Results	Stipulations	Times
1^{P}	Team Noah (Atsushi Kotoge, Hajime Ohara and Hi69) defeated Hiroto Tsuruya, Midori Takahashi and Yuto Koyanagi by pinfall	Six-man tag team match	6:34
2^{P}	Eita defeated Katsumi Inahata by pinfall	Singles match	3:45
3^{P}	White Raven Squad (Hayata, Kenta and Tetsuya Endo) defeated Daiki Odashima, Kazuyuki Fujita and Mohammed Yone by pinfall	Six-man tag team match	8:38
4^{P}	Knull defeated Lykos Gym (Kid Lykos and Kid Lykos II) by pinfall	2-on-1 handicap match	4:22
5	Ratel's (Manabu Soya and Saxon Huxley) and Yuki Iino defeated All Rebellion (Alejandro, Harutoki and Kaito Kiyomiya) and Team 2000X (Masa Kitamiya, Tadasuke and Takashi Sugiura) by pinfall	Three-way nine-man tag team match	5:32
6	Team 2000X (Alpha Wolf and Kai Fujimura) defeated Los Tranquilos de Japon (Angel Reyes and Ryusei) by pinfall	Tag team match	7:29
7	Bushi defeated Jun Masaoka by pinfall	Singles match	11:44
8	Kenoh and Naomichi Marufuji defeated The Good Brothers (Doc Gallows and Karl Anderson) by pinfall	Tag team match	10:50
9	Ozawa defeated Tetsuya Naito by pinfall	Singles match	18:12
10	Dragon Bane defeated Amakusa (c) by pinfall	Singles match for the GHC Junior Heavyweight Championship	14:33
11	Shane Haste defeated Yoshiki Inamura (c) by pinfall	Singles match for the GHC Heavyweight Championship	31:42
(c) / – the champion(s) heading into the match; P / – the match was broadcast on the pre-show
