= Pro-Wrestling Shi-En =

Japanese professional wrestling company

- Pro-Wrestling Shi-En logo
- Founded: 2010
- Style: Puroresu, Comedy wrestling
- Headquarters: Osaka, Japan
- Founder: Kiai-ryuken Ecchan
- Owner: Kiai-ryuken Ecchan
- Website: shi-en.com

Pro-Wrestling Shi-En (Japanese: プロレスリング紫焔(しえん), Hepburn: Puroresuringu Shi-En) is an Osaka-based Japanese professional wrestling promotion founded in 2010 by Eiji Sahara, better known by the ring name Kiai-ryuken Ecchan, with the goal of filling-in the spot left by the closure of Hustle. The name Shi-En (紫焔; lit. "purple flame") is a play on the word shien (支援), meaning "support". The mottoes of the promotion are "Energize Osaka" and "Bring life back to pro-wrestling". In addition to monthly paid shows, the organization holds many free shows in a special outdoor ring at Uehonmachi Hi-Hi Town, next to the Uehonmachi Station.

== History ==
The promotion was founded by Eiji Sahara, who was a member of the student wrestling club called Osaka Wrestling Federation (OWF) in Osaka Gakuin University, under the ring name Kiai-ryuken Ecchan. Throughout 2009, Sahara organized a dozen wrestling events with his classmates in a makeshift ring set up in Triangle Park, in Amerikamura, Osaka. The following year, the promotion was officially founded and, on February 20, a pre-launch event titled "ƒ (forte)" was held at the Nipponbashi 4-chōme Theatre. On March 6, a second pre-launch event titled "ƒƒ (fortissimo)" was held in Triangle Park; then, on March 21, the official launching event titled "ƒƒƒ (fortississimo)" was held at the Black Chamber in the Creative Center Osaka.

On February 21, 2015, the promotion held its 5th anniversary event at the Osaka Prefectural Gymnasium.

On September 15, 2018, and March 31, 2019, the promotion took part in two of Keiji Muto's Pro-Wrestling Festival events, held respectively in Kashihara, Nara and Hanyū, Saitama.

On February 9, 2019, the promotion held its first event in Tokyo, at Shin-Kiba 1st Ring.

On March 22, 2020, Shi-En held its 10th anniversary event at Cool Japan Park Osaka.

== Personnel ==
=== Wrestlers ===
Ring name	Real name	Notes
Bahamut	Undisclosed	
Bakotsu	Undisclosed	
Bomber Okuno	Unknown	Pro-Wrestling Shi-En Singles Champion
Daddy Loco	Unknown	
Dongury Fujie	Unknown	
Genki Yamada	Unknown	
Hiroaki Taniguchi	Unknown	Pro-Wrestling Shi-En Tag Team Champion
Hiroto Okubo	Unknown	
Joker Fuyuki	Unknown	
Kiai-ryuken Ecchan	Eiji Sahara	
La Colza	Undisclosed	
Maro Kuriyama	Kazuya Kuriyama	
Raipachi Isobe	Unknown	
Rascal Fujiwara	Unknown	
Seiya Nishiyama	Unknown	
Tetsuya Gotoh	Unknown	
Tiger Heart	Undisclosed	Pro-Wrestling Shi-En 6-Man Tag Team Champion
Tomo Enami	Unknown	"I Love Shi-En" Champion
Yoriaki Ogyu	Unknown	
Yosuke Takii	Unknown	Pro-Wrestling Shi-En 6-Man Tag Team Champion
Yuko Kawabata	Unknown	Pro-Wrestling Shi-En 6-Man Tag Team Champion
Yuta Ogawa	Unknown	

=== Sporadic characters ===
Ring name	Real name	Notes
Kirin	Undisclosed	
Masked Police 24	Undisclosed	

=== Staff ===
Ring name	Real name	Notes
God Hattori	Unknown	Referee
Ponta Tonegawa	Unknown	Referee
Shodai Deguchi	Shodai Deguchi	Ring announcer

=== Notable alumni ===
- Jun Masaoka
- Orca Uto (as Battosai Shichiten)
- Toru (as Agu Matsunaga)

== Championships and accomplishments ==
Shi-En currently has four titles. The three main titles are the Pro-Wrestling Shi-En Singles, Tag Team and 6-Man Tag Team Championships. The "I Love Shi-En" Championship is a secondary title.

Championship	Current champion(s)	Reign	Date won	Days held	Location	Notes	Ref.
Pro-Wrestling Shi-En Singles Championship	Bomber Okuno	1	December 28, 2025	329	Osaka, Japan	Defeated Hiroaki Taniguchi at the Higashinari Community Center.	
"I Love Shi-En" Championship	Tomo Enami	1	October 12, 2026	41	Osaka, Japan	Defeated Kian-ryuuken Ecchan at the Oyodo Community Center.	
Pro-Wrestling Shi-En Tag Team Championship	Ayato Horiuchi and Hiroaki Taniguchi	1 (3, 2)	August 16, 2026	98	Osaka, Japan	Defeated Hiroto Okubo and Tetsuya Goto at the Higashinari Community Center.	
Pro-Wrestling Shi-En 6-Man Tag Team Championship	Tiger Heart, Yosuke Takii and Yuko Kawabata	1 (1, 2, 1)	February 23, 2026	272	Osaka, Japan	Defeated Kansai Genki Hōshutsu Kyōkai (Kiai-ryuken Ecchan, Hiroto Okubo and Tomo Enami) at the Ikuno Community Center.	

=== Pro-Wrestling Shi-En Singles Championship ===
Pro-Wrestling Shi-En Singles Championship

Details
- Promotion: Pro-Wrestling Shi-En
- Date established: April 24, 2016
- Current champion: Bomber Okuno
- Date won: December 28, 2025
Statistics
- First champion: Kiai-ryuken Ecchan
- Longest reign: Maro Kuriyama (727 days)
- Shortest reign: Jun Masaoka (28 days)
- Oldest champion: Maro Kuriyama (45 years, 92 days)
- Youngest champion: Hiroaki Taniguchi (28 years, 90 days)
- Heaviest champion: Hiroaki Taniguchi (105 kg)
- Lightest champion: Jun Masaoka (70 kg)

The Pro-Wrestling Shi-En Singles Championship (Japanese: プロレスリング紫焔シングル王座, Hepburn: Puroresuringu Shi-En Shinguru Ōza) is a professional wrestling championship created and promoted by Pro-Wrestling Shi-En. It is the top title of the company and has been held by a total of seven champions in ten different recognized reigns. The current champion is Bomber Okuno who is in his first reign.

Key
No.	Overall reign number
Reign	Reign number for the specific champion
Days	Number of days held
Defenses	Number of successful defenses
+	Current reign is changing daily

No.	Champion	Championship change			Reign statistics			Notes	Ref.
No.	Champion	Date	Event	Location	Reign	Days	Defenses	Notes	Ref.
1	Kiai-ryuken Ecchan	April 24, 2016	6th Anniversary Show	Osaka, Japan	1	357	1	Defeated Tiger Heart to become the first champion.	
2	Dongury Fujie	April 16, 2017	7th Anniversary Show	Osaka, Japan	1	364	2		
3	Maro Kuriyama	April 15, 2018	8th Anniversary Show	Osaka, Japan	1	238	3		
4	Kiai-ryuken Ecchan	December 9, 2018	Shi-En	Osaka, Japan	2	441	4		
5	Jun Masaoka	February 23, 2020	Shi-En	Ōyodo, Japan	1	28	0		
6	Hiroto Okubo	March 22, 2020	10th Anniversary Show	Osaka, Japan	1	392	3		
7	Hiroaki Taniguchi	April 18, 2021	Shi-En	Osaka, Japan	1	336	3		
8	Maro Kuriyama	March 20, 2022	12th Anniversary Show	Osaka, Japan	2	727	10	This was a no disqualification match.	
9	Hiroaki Taniguchi	March 16, 2024	14th Anniversary Show	Osaka, Japan	2	652	5		
10	Bomber Okuno	December 28, 2025	Shi-En	Osaka, Japan	1	329+	4		

==== Combined reigns ====
†	Indicates the current champion

Rank	Wrestler	No. of reigns	Combined defenses	Combined days
1	Hiroaki Taniguchi	2	8	982
2	Maro Kuriyama	2	13	965
3	Kiai-ryuken Ecchan	2	5	798
4	Hiroto Okubo	1	3	392
5	Dongury Fujie	1	2	364
6	Bomber Okuno †	1	4	329+
7	Jun Masaoka	1	0	28

=== "I Love Shi-En" Championship ===
"I Love Shi-En" Championship

Details
- Promotion: Pro-Wrestling Shi-En
- Date established: April 15, 2018
- Current champion: Tomo Enami
- Date won: October 12, 2026
Statistics
- First champion: Kiai-ryuken Ecchan
- Most reigns: Kiai-ryuken Ecchan (6 reigns)
- Longest reign: Raipachi Isobe (448 days)
- Shortest reign: Kiai-ryuken Ecchan (27 days)

The "I Love Shi-En" Championship (Japanese: “I LOVE 紫焔”王座, Hepburn: "Ai Rabu Shi-En" Ōza) is a professional wrestling championship created and promoted by Pro-Wrestling Shi-En. It is a secondary title of the company that has been held by a total of 13 champions in 21 different recognized reigns. Anyone can challenge for the title and the reigning champion chooses the stipulation of the matches. The current champion is Tomo Enami who is in his first reign.

Key
No.	Overall reign number
Reign	Reign number for the specific champion
Days	Number of days held
Defenses	Number of successful defenses
+	Current reign is changing daily

No.	Champion	Championship change			Reign statistics			Notes	Ref.
No.	Champion	Date	Event	Location	Reign	Days	Defenses	Notes	Ref.
1	Kiai-ryuken Ecchan	April 15, 2018	8th Anniversary Show	Osaka, Japan	1	189	6	Defeated Raipachi Isobe to become the first champion.	
2	Daichi	October 21, 2018	Shi-En	Osaka, Japan	1	266	4	This was a tag team match in which Daichi was teaming with Kirin while Kiai-ryuken Ecchan was teaming with Maro Kuriyama. Daichi pinned Ecchan to win the title.	
3	Dongury Fujie	July 14, 2019	Shi-En	Osaka, Japan	1	189	3	This was a submission match.	
4	Raipachi Isobe	January 19, 2020	Shi-En	Osaka, Japan	1	35	0		
5	Dongury Fujie	February 23, 2020	Shi-En	Ōyodo, Japan	2	28	0	This match was fought under normal rules for Raipachi Isobe, but under 2-count rules for Dongury Fujie.	
6	Kiai-ryuken Ecchan	March 22, 2020	10th Anniversary Show	Osaka, Japan	2	140	0	This was a falls count anywhere match.	
7	Bakotsu	August 9, 2020	Shi-En	Osaka, Japan	1	43	1	This was a five-way match also involving Joker Fuyuki, Tomo Enami and Maro Kuriyama.	
8	Kiai-ryuken Ecchan	September 21, 2020	Shi-En	Osaka, Japan	3	27	0	This was an "Elastic Band Chicken Race" held immediately after the scheduled title match went to a time limit draw.	
9	God Hattori	October 18, 2020	Shi-En	Osaka, Japan	1	70	1	This was a "Referee Judge Match" also involving Daichi and Bakotsu.	
10	Kiai-ryuken Ecchan	December 27, 2020	Shi-En	Osaka, Japan	4	331	2	This was a "Referee Judge Match" also involving Asuka The World and Bakotsu.	
11	Asuka The World	November 23, 2021	Shi-En	Osaka, Japan	1	306	5		
12	Raipachi Isobe	September 25, 2022	Shi-En	Osaka, Japan	2	448	6		
13	Hiroto Okubo	December 17, 2023	Shi-En	Osaka, Japan	1	90	0		
14	Momoka Hanazono	March 16, 2024	14th Anniversary Show	Osaka, Japan	1	372	2	This was a "Falls Count Anywhere Fans Bring the Weapons Happy Hardcore Match". Hanazono is the first woman to hold the title.	
14	Maro Kuriyama	March 23, 2025	15th Anniversary Show	Osaka, Japan	1	308	4	This was a No Disqualification Falls Count Anywhere match.	
15	Ogyu Yoriaki	January 25, 2026	Shi-En	Osaka, Japan	1	29	0	This was a four-way match also involving Bakotsu and Tomo Enami.	
16	Maro Kuriyama	February 23, 2026	Shi-En	Osaka, Japan	2	26	0		
17	Kiai-ryuken Ecchan	March 21, 2026	16th Anniversary Show	Osaka, Japan	5	71	0		
18	Joker Fuyuki	May 31, 2026	Shi-En	Osaka, Japan	1	28	0	This was a five-way match also involving Donguri Fujie, Raipachi Isobe and Yuko Kawabata.	
19	Dongury Fujie	June 28, 2026	Shi-En	Osaka, Japan	3	28	0		
20	Kiai-ryuken Ecchan	July 26, 2026	Shi-En	Osaka, Japan	6	78	1	This was a six-way match also involving Bakotsu, Genki Yamada, Ogyu Yoriaki and Tomo Enami.	
21	Tomo Enami	October 12, 2026	Shi-En	Osaka, Japan	1	41+	0		

==== Combined reigns ====
†	Indicates the current champion

Rank	Wrestler	No. of reigns	Combined defenses	Combined days
1	Kiai-ryuken Ecchan	6	9	809
2	Raipachi Isobe	2	6	483
3	Maro Kuriyama	1	4	334
4	Momoka Hanazono	1	2	372
5	Asuka The World	1	5	306
6	Daichi	1	4	266
7	Dongury Fujie	3	3	245
8	Hiroto Okubo	1	0	90
9	God Hattori	1	1	70
10	Bakotsu	1	1	43
11	Tomo Enami †	1	0	41+
12	Ogyu Yoriaki	1	0	29
13	Joker Fuyuki	1	0	28

=== Pro-Wrestling Shi-En Tag Team Championship ===
Pro-Wrestling Shi-En Tag Team Championship

Details
- Promotion: Pro-Wrestling Shi-En
- Date established: March 9, 2013
- Current champions: Ayato Horiuchi and Hiroaki Taniguchi
- Date won: August 16, 2026
Statistics
- First champions: Rascal Fujiwara and Dongury Fujie
- Most reigns: (as a team); Rascal Fujiwara and Dongury Fujie, and Maro Kuriyama and Raipachi Isobe (3 reigns) (as an individual); Raipachi Isobe (6 reigns)
- Longest reign: Kansai Genki Hōshutsu Kyōkai (Kiai-ryuken Ecchan and Bull Armor Takuya) (539 days)
- Shortest reign: Kiai-ryuken Ecchan and Raipachi Isobe (<1 day)

The Pro-Wrestling Shi-En Tag Team Championship (Japanese: プロレスリング紫焔タッグ王座, Hepburn: Puroresuringu Shi-En Taggu Ōza) is a professional wrestling tag team championship created and promoted by Pro-Wrestling Shi-En. There have been a total of 22 reigns shared between 21 wrestlers. The current champions are Ayato Horiuchi and Hiroaki Taniguchi who are in their first reign as a team, but are in their first and third reigns individually.

Key
No.	Overall reign number
Reign	Reign number for the specific team—reign numbers for the individuals are in parentheses, if different
Days	Number of days held
Defenses	Number of successful defenses
(NLT)	Championship change took place "no later than" the date listed
<1	Reign lasted less than a day
+	Current reign is changing daily

No.	Champion	Championship change			Reign statistics			Notes	Ref.
No.	Champion	Date	Event	Location	Reign	Days	Defenses	Notes	Ref.
1	Rascal Fujiwara and Dongury Fujie	March 9, 2013	Shi-En	Osaka, Japan	1	(Note: The exact date the championship was vacated has not been confirmed, putting their title reign at between 1 day and 92 days.)	0	Defeated Kiai-ryuken Ecchan and Asuka The World to become the first champions.	
—	Vacated	June 9, 2013 (NLT)	—	—	—	—	—	Title vacated for unknown reasons.	
2	Tribe (Agū Matsunaga and Jun Masaoka)	June 9, 2013	Shi-En	Osaka, Japan	1	189	1	Defeated Dongury Fujie and Raipachi Isobe to win the vacant title.	
3	Kansai Genki Hōshutsu Kyōkai (Kiai-ryuken Ecchan and Bull Armor Takuya)	December 15, 2013	Shi-En	Osaka, Japan	1	539	3		
4	Hiroto Okubo and Jun Masaoka	June 7, 2015	Shi-En	Osaka, Japan	1 (1, 2)	322	2		
5	Raipachi Isobe and Maro Kuriyama	April 24, 2016	6th Anniversary Show	Osaka, Japan	1	42	0		
6	Rascal Fujiwara and Dongury Fujie	June 5, 2016	Shi-En	Osaka, Japan	2	378	4		
7	Raipachi Isobe and Hiroaki Taniguchi	June 18, 2017	Shi-En	Osaka, Japan	1 (2, 1)	91	1		
8	Hiroto Okubo and Asuka The World	September 17, 2017	Shi-En	Osaka, Japan	1 (2, 1)	161	1		
9	Kiai-ryuken Ecchan and Raipachi Isobe	February 25, 2018	Shi-En	Osaka, Japan	1 (2, 3)	<1	0		
10	Hiroaki Taniguchi and Tatsunari Nashio	February 25, 2018	Shi-En	Osaka, Japan	1 (2, 1)	108	1		
—	Vacated	June 13, 2018	—	—	—	—	—	Title vacated due to Nashio being sidelined with an injury.	
11	Dongury Fujie and Jun Masaoka	October 21, 2018	Shi-En	Osaka, Japan	1 (3, 3)	147	2	Defeated Hiroto Obuko and Raipachi Isobe in the final of a four-team tournament to win the vacant title.	
12	Tomo Emami and Yoriaki Ogyu	March 17, 2019	9th Anniversary Show	Osaka, Japan	1	147	1		
13	Liberta (Maro Kuriyama and Raipachi Isobe)	August 11, 2019	Shi-En	Osaka, Japan	2 (2, 4)	162	1		
—	Vacated	January 20, 2020	—	—	—	—	—	Isobe vacated the title when Kuriyama left Liberta.	
14	Liberta (Raipachi Isobe and Kirin)	March 22, 2020	10th Anniversary Show	Osaka, Japan	1 (5, 1)	491	3	Defeated Maro Kuriyama and Rascal Fujiwara to win the vacant title.	
—	Vacated	July 26, 2021	—	—	—	—	—	Isobe vacated the title when Liberta disbanded.	
15	Rascal Fujiwara and Dongury Fujie	October 17, 2021	Shi-En	Osaka, Japan	3 (3, 4)	217	1	Defeated Hiroaki Taniguchi and Raipachi Isobe, and Daichi and Bomber Okuno in a three-way tag team match to win the vacant title.	
16	Kansai Genki Hōshutsu Kyōkai (Kiai-ryuken Ecchan and Tomo Emami)	May 22, 2022	Shi-En	Osaka, Japan	1 (3, 2)	301	4		
17	BB Brothers (Bomber Okuno and BBQ Aoki)	March 19, 2023	13th Anniversary Show	Osaka, Japan	1	98	1		
18	Yosuke Takii and Tetsuya Goto	June 25, 2023	Shi-En	Osaka, Japan	1	265	3		
19	Bahamut and Dongury Fujie	March 16, 2024	14th Anniversary Show	Osaka, Japan	1 (1, 5)	512	4		
20	Maro Kuriyama and Raipachi Isobe	August 10, 2025	Shi-En	Osaka, Japan	3 (3, 6)	140	0		
21	Hiroto Okubo and Tetsuya Goto	December 28, 2025	Shi-En	Osaka, Japan	1 (3, 2)	231	3		
22	Ayato Horiuchi and Hiroaki Taniguchi	August 16, 2026	Shi-En	Osaka, Japan	1 (1, 3)	98+	0		

==== Combined reigns ====
†	Indicates the current champions
¤	The exact length of at least one title reign is uncertain, so the shortest possible length is used.

===== By team =====
Rank	Team	No. of reigns	Combined defenses	Combined days
1	Rascal Fujiwara and Dongury Fujie	3	6	596¤
2	Kansai Genki Hōshutsu Kyōkai (Kiai-ryuken Ecchan and Bull Armor Takuya)	1	3	539
3	Bahamut and Dongury Fujie	1	4	511
4	Liberta (Raipachi Isobe and Kirin)	1	3	491
5	Raipachi Isobe and Maro Kuriyama	3	1	344
6	Hiroto Okubo and Jun Masaoka	1	2	322
7	Kansai Genki Hōshutsu Kyōkai (Kiai-ryuken Ecchan and Tomo Emami)	1	4	295
8	Yosuke Takii and Tetsuya Goto	1	3	265
9	Hiroto Okubo and Tetsuya Goto	1	3	231
10	Tribe (Agū Matsunaga and Jun Masaoka)	1	1	189
11	Hiroto Okubo and Asuka The World	1	1	161
12	Dongury Fujie and Jun Masaoka	1	2	147
12	Tomo Emami and Yoriaki Ogyu	1	1	147
14	Hiroaki Taniguchi and Tatsunari Nashio	1	1	108
15	Ayato Horiuchi and Hiroaki Taniguchi †	1	0	98+
16	BB Brothers (Bomber Okuno and BBQ Aoki)	1	1	98
17	Raipachi Isobe and Hiroaki Taniguchi	1	1	91
18	Kiai-ryuken Ecchan and Raipachi Isobe	1	0	<1

===== By wrestler =====
Rank	Wrestler	No. of reigns	Combined defenses	Combined days
1	Dongury Fujie	5	11	1,345¤
2	Raipachi Isobe	6	5	926
3	Kiai-ryuken Ecchan	3	7	840
4	Hiroto Okubo	3	6	713
5	Jun Masaoka	3	5	658
6	Rascal Fujiwara	3	5	596¤
7	Bull Armor Takuya	1	3	539
8	Bahamut	1	4	511
9	Tetsuya Goto	2	6	496
10	Kirin	1	3	491
11	Tomo Emami	2	5	448
12	Maro Kuriyama	3	1	344
13	Hiroaki Taniguchi †	3	2	297+
14	Yusuke Takii	1	3	265
15	Agū Matsunaga	1	1	189
16	Asuka The World	1	1	161
17	Yoriaki Ogyu	1	1	147
18	Tatsunari Nashio	1	1	108
19	Ayato Horiuchi †	1	0	98+
20	BBQ Aoki	1	1	98
20	Bomber Okuno	1	1	98

=== Pro-Wrestling Shi-En 6-Man Tag Team Championship ===
Pro-Wrestling Shi-En 6-Man Tag Team Championship

Details
- Promotion: Pro-Wrestling Shi-En
- Date established: December 30, 2020
- Current champions: Tiger Heart, Yosuke Takii and Yuko Kawabata
- Date won: February 23, 2026
Statistics
- First champions: Maro Kuriyama, Bahamut and Dongury Fujie
- Most reigns: As tag team (2 reigns): Mōretsu; As individual (3 reigns): Dongury Fujie; Rascal Fujiwara; Hiroaki Taniguchi
- Longest reign: Kansai Genki Hōshutsu (Kiai-ryuken Ecchan, Hiroto Okubo and Tomo Enami) (393 days)
- Shortest reign: Mōretsu (Hiroaki Taniguchi, Bomber Okuno and Yoriaki Ogyu) (91 days)

The Pro-Wrestling Shi-En 6-Man Tag Team Championship (Japanese: プロレスリング紫焔6人タッグ王座, Hepburn: Puroresuringu Shi-En Roku-nin Taggu Ōza) is a professional wrestling tag team championship created and promoted by Pro-Wrestling Shi-En. It is contested for by teams of three wrestlers. There have been a total of 10 reigns shared between 18 wrestlers. The current champions are Tiger Heart, Yosuke Takii and Yuko Kawabata, who are in their first reign as a team.

Key
No.	Overall reign number
Reign	Reign number for the specific team—reign numbers for the individuals are in parentheses, if different
Days	Number of days held
Defenses	Number of successful defenses
+	Current reign is changing daily

No.	Champion	Championship change			Reign statistics			Notes	Ref.
No.	Champion	Date	Event	Location	Reign	Days	Defenses	Notes	Ref.
1	Maro Factory (Maro Kuriyama, Bahamut and Dongury Fujie)	March 21, 2021	11th Anniversary Show	Osaka, Japan	1	392	1	Defeated Liberta (Jun Masaoka, Raipachi Isobe and Kirin) in the final of a four-team tournament to become the first champions. The scheduled match ended in a no contest decision, but was immediately restarted under no disqualification rules.	
2	Hiroaki Taniguchi, Raipachi Isobe and Yosuke Takii	April 17, 2022	Shi-En	Osaka, Japan	1	92	0		
3	Maro Factory (Rascal Fujiwara, Dongury Fujie and Tetsuya Gotoh)	July 18, 2022	Shi-En	Osaka, Japan	1 (1, 2, 1)	160	1		
4	Bahamut, Daichi and Joker Fuyuki	December 25, 2022	Shi-En	Osaka, Japan	1 (2, 1, 1)	147	0		
5	Kiai-ryuken Ecchan, Rascal Fujiwara and Dongury Fujie	May 21, 2023	Shi-En	Osaka, Japan	1 (1, 2, 3)	210	0		
6	Mōretsu (Hiroaki Taniguchi, Bomber Okuno and Yoriaki Ogyu)	December 17, 2023	Shi-En	Osaka, Japan	1 (2, 1, 1)	217	2		
7	Notorious (Raipachi Isobe, Seiya Nishiyama and Rascal Fujiwara)	July 21, 2024	Shi-En	Osaka, Japan	1 (2, 1, 3)	98	0		
8	Mōretsu (Hiroaki Taniguchi, Bomber Okuno and Yoriaki Ogyu)	October 27, 2024	Shi-En	Osaka, Japan	2 (3, 2, 2)	91	0		
9	Kansai Genki Hōshutsu Kyōkai (Kiai-ryuken Ecchan, Hiroto Okubo and Tomo Enami)	January 26, 2025	Shi-En	Osaka, Japan	1 (2, 1, 1)	393	2		
10	Tiger Heart, Yosuke Takii and Yuko Kawabata	February 23, 2026	Shi-En	Osaka, Japan	1 (1, 2, 1)	272+	2		

==== Combined reigns ====
†	Indicates the current champions

===== By team =====
Rank	Team	No. of reigns	Combined defenses	Combined days
1	Kansai Genki Hōshutsu (Kiai-ryuken Ecchan, Hiroto Okubo and Tomo Enami)	1	2	393
2	Maro Factory (Maro Kuriyama, Bahamut and Dongury Fujie)	1	1	392
3	Mōretsu (Hiroaki Taniguchi, Bomber Okuno and Yoriaki Ogyu)	2	2	308
4	Tiger Heart, Yosuke Takii and Yuko Kawabata †	1	2	272+
5	Kiai-ryuken Ecchan, Rascal Fujiwara and Dongury Fujie	1	0	210
6	Maro Factory (Rascal Fujiwara, Dongury Fujie and Tetsuya Goto)	1	1	160
7	Bahamut, Daichi and Joker Fuyuki	1	0	147
8	Notorious (Raipachi Isobe, Seiya Nishiyama and Rascal Fujiwara)	1	0	98
9	Hiroaki Taniguchi, Raipachi Isobe and Yosuke Takii	1	0	92

===== By wrestler =====
Rank	Wrestler	No. of reigns	Combined defenses	Combined days
1	Dongury Fujie	3	2	762
2	Kiai-ryuken Ecchan	2	2	603
3	Bahamut	2	1	539
4	Rascal Fujiwara	3	1	468
5	Hiroaki Taniguchi	3	2	400
6	Tomo Enami	1	2	393
6	Hiroto Okubo	1	2	393
8	Maro Kuriyama	1	1	392
9	Yosuke Takii †	2	2	364+
10	Bomber Okuno	2	2	308
10	Yoriaki Ogyu	2	2	308
12	Tiger Heart †	1	2	272+
12	Yuko Kawabata †	1	2	272+
14	Raipachi Isobe	2	0	190
15	Tetsuya Goto	1	1	160
16	Daichi	1	0	147
16	Joker Fuyuki	1	0	147
18	Seiya Nishiyama	1	0	98

=== Tournaments ===
Tournament	Latest winner(s)	Date won	Location	Notes	Ref.
One Chance Tournament	Tetsuya Goto	October 15, 2023	Osaka, Japan	Defeated Bomber Okuno in the tournament final.	
