= Ryūkon Cup =

Tenryu Project event series

- Ryūkon-hai calligraphy by Makiyo Shimada, Genichiro Tenryu's wife, used as a logo
- Promotions: Tenryu Project
- Nicknames: Dragon Soul Cup
- First event: Ryūkon Cup I
- Event gimmick: Single-elimination tournament

The Ryūkon Cup (Japanese: 龍魂杯, Hepburn: Ryūkon-hai; lit. "Dragon Soul Cup") is an annual single elimination professional wrestling tournament held by Tenryu Project since 2021.

The first edition, announced at Survive the Revolution Vol. 11 on October 26, 2021, was meant to feature wrestlers who had a connection to Tenryu Project founder Genichiro Tenryu. Though it is held every year in November, the first three editions were numbered instead of being referred to by year (e.g. the first edition was titled Ryūkon Cup I (Note: 第一回龍魂杯, Daiikkai Ryūkon-hai; "Dragon Soul Cup I")).

Toru is the inaugural winner of the tournament.

== Tournaments ==
Tournament	Year	Winner	Times won	Participants	Ref.
Ryūkon Cup I	2021	Toru	1	16	
Ryūkon Cup II	2022	Keita Yano	1	16	
Ryūkon Cup III	2023	Kengo	1	16	
Ryūkon Cup 2024	2024	Hideyoshi Kamitani	1	24	
Ryūkon Cup 2025	2025	Hikaru Sato	1	16	
Ryūkon Cup 2026	2026	Koji Iwamoto	1	16	

== Results ==
=== 2021 ===
Ryūkon Cup I
- Promotion: Tenryu Project
- Date: November 14–15, 2021
- City: Tokyo, Japan
- Venue: Shin-Kiba 1st Ring

Ryūkon Cup chronology
← Previous —	Next → II

The first edition of the Ryūkon Cup featured 11 wrestlers each representing their respective home promotion as well as five freelancers for a total of 16 participants. Ryoma Tsukamoto of All Japan Pro Wrestling was originally scheduled to enter the tournament, but after he suffered an injury on November 11, he had to be replaced by Dan Tamura. The tournament ran for two days; the first round played out on November 14, at Survive the Revolution Vol. 12, then the remaining matches were held the next day at Survive the Revolution Vol. 13. Representing Total Triumph Team Pro-Wrestling (TTT), Toru defeated Professional Wrestling Wallabee's Keita Yano in the final to become the first winner of the tournament.

Round 1 November 14, 2021
Rey Paloma	13:46
Hikaru Sato	Sub
Toru	Pin
Kohei Sato	10:47
Leona	Pin
Dan Tamura	7:10
Mizuki Watase	11:03
Kengo	Pin
Keita Yano	Sub
Shoki Kitamura	10:14
Kenichiro Arai	10:40
Shota	Pin
Sushi	7:13
Masayuki Kono	Pin
Kazumasa Yoshida	Forfeit
Hub	—

Round 2 November 15, 2021
Hikaru Sato	11:19
Toru	Pin
Leona	13:13
Kengo	Pin
Keita Yano	Pin
Shota	11:39
Masayuki Kono	Pin
Kazumasa Yoshida	8:05

Semifinals; November 15, 2021
Toru	Pin
Kengo	10:08
Keita Yano	Pin
Masayuki Kono	7:04

Final; November 15, 2021
Toru	Pin
Keita Yano	16:23

=== 2022 ===
Ryūkon Cup II
- Promotion: Tenryu Project
- Date: November 12–13, 2022
- City: Tokyo, Japan
- Venue: Shin-Kiba 1st Ring

Ryūkon Cup chronology
← Previous; I	Next → III

The second Ryūkon Cup ran between November 12 and 13, and featured 16 participants. Previous year finalist Keita Yano defeated Hikaru Sato in the final to win the tournament.

Round 1 November 12, 2022
Don Fujii	Sub
Kenichiro Arai	9:44
Kohei Sato	Pin
Kazumasa Yoshida	9:33
Hikaru Sato	Pin
Rey Paloma	14:33
Kenshin Chikano	10:01
Kouki Iwasaki	Pin
Keita Yano	Sub
Kotaro Nasu	11:28
Naoki Tanizaki	Pin
Oji Shiiba	11:48
Sushi	12:14
Mizuki Watase	Pin
Masayuki Kono	5:18
Takuro Niki	Pin

Round 2 November 13, 2022
Don Fujii	3:03
Kohei Sato	Pin
Hikaru Sato	Sub
Kouki Iwasaki	13:13
Keita Yano	Sub
Naoki Tanizaki	9:52
Mizuki Watase	3:10
Takuro Niki	DQ

Semifinals; November 13, 2022
Kohei Sato	5:45
Hikaru Sato	Pin
Keita Yano	Sub
Takuro Niki	10:11

Final; November 13, 2022
Hikaru Sato	16:21
Keita Yano	Sub

=== 2023 ===
Ryūkon Cup III
- Promotion: Tenryu Project
- Date: November 6–19, 2023
- City: Various, Japan; Final: Tokyo, Japan
- Venue: Various; Final: Korakuen Hall

Ryūkon Cup chronology
← Previous; II	Next → 2024

The third Ryūkon Cup ran between November 6 and 19, and featured 16 participants. The two halves of the bracket were designated as A Block and B Block. The entire A Block played out on November 6 at Shin-Kiba 1st Ring in Tokyo, B Block played out on November 11 at Azalea Taisho in Osaka, and the final was held on November 19 in Korakuen Hall. Kengo defeated Keita Yano in the final to win the tournament.

Round 1 November 6–11, 2023	Round 2 November 6–11, 2023
Kenichiro Arai	9:13
Keita Yano	Sub
Keita Yano	Sub
Yuya Susumu	10:53
Yuya Susumu	Pin
Dan Tamura	5:48
A Block
Yusuke Kodama	Pin
Kazumasa Yoshida	7:34
Yusuke Kodama	Pin
Kohei Sato	7:02
Kohei Sato	Sub
Masayuki Kono	10:03
Hikaru Sato	Sub
Rey Paloma	13:13
Hikaru Sato	Pin
Kumaarashi	7:51
Sushi	11:14
Kumaarashi	Pin
B Block
Kengo	Pin
Kouki Iwasaki	11:45
Kengo	Pin
Naoki Tanizaki	15:12
Naoki Tanizaki	Pin
Takahiro Katori	10:07

Semifinals; November 6–11, 2023
Keita Yano	Sub
Yusuke Kodama	14:04
Hikaru Sato	20:14
Kengo	Pin

Final; November 19, 2023
Keita Yano	27:51
Kengo	Pin

=== 2024 ===
Ryūkon Cup 2024
- Promotion: Tenryu Project
- Date: November 15–23, 2024
- City: Tokyo, Japan
- Venue: Various; Final: Shin-Kiba 1st Ring

Ryūkon Cup chronology
← Previous; III	Next → 2025

The fourth Ryūkon Cup ran between November 15 and 23, and featured 24 participants with 8 receiving a bye to round 2. The matches were announced on October 20. Hideyoshi Kamitani defeated Hikaru Sato in the final to win the tournament.

Round 1 November 15
Yusuke Kodama	Pin
Ayumu Honda	10:18
Kohei Sato	Sub
Daichi Hashimoto	9:45
Shigehiro Irie	Pin
Mizuki Watase	8:14
"brother" Yasshi	10:15
Hideyoshi Kamitani	Pin
Kengo	Pin
Oji Shiiba	10:21
Kenichiro Arai	8:39
Yuya Susumu	Sub
Tatsuhito Takaiwa	10:15
Sushi	Pin
Hikaru Sato	Sub
Rey Paloma	12:05

Round 2 November 17
Yusuke Kodama	Sub
Takuro Niki	13:33
Kohei Sato	Pin
Kazumasa Yoshida	6:40
Shigehiro Irie	Pin
Yuji Hino	8:46
Hideyoshi Kamitani	Pin
Masayuki Kono	9:31
Kengo	Pin
Jun Masaoka	11:40
Yuya Susumu	Sub
Kouki Iwasaki	9:32
Sushi	7:09
Koji Iwamoto	Pin
Hikaru Sato	TKO
Naoki Tanizaki	14:50

Quarterfinals; November 23
Yusuke Kodama	7:15
Kohei Sato	Pin
Shigehiro Irie	5:16
Hideyoshi Kamitani	Pin
Kengo	12:30
Yuya Susumu	Sub
Koji Iwamoto	7:52
Hikaru Sato	Sub

Semifinals; November 23
Kohei Sato	8:14
Hideyoshi Kamitani	Pin
Yuya Susumu	1:08
Hikaru Sato	Sub

Final; November 23
Hideyoshi Kamitani	Pin
Hikaru Sato	15:34

=== 2025 ===
Ryūkon Cup 2025
- Promotion: Tenryu Project
- Date: November 24, 2025
- City: Tokyo, Japan
- Venue: Shin-Kiba 1st Ring

Ryūkon Cup chronology
← Previous; 2024	Next → 2026

The fifth Ryūkon Cup ran between two shows held on November 24, 2025, at Shin-Kiba 1st Ring in Tokyo. Hikaru Sato defeated Daichi Hashimoto in the final to win the tournament.

Round 1 November 24
Kengo	Pin
Naoki Tanizaki	10:13
Sushi	10:07
Keita Yano	Pin
Hideyoshi Kamitani	Pin
Kenichiro Arai	9:37
Mizuki Watase	6:18
Hikaru Sato	TKO
Yusuke Kodama	11:46
Koji Iwamoto	Pin
Yuya Susumu	Sub
Kazumasa Yoshida	10:13
Daichi Hashimoto	Pin
Masayuki Kono	7:42
Rey Paloma	6:22
Kohei Sato	Pin

Round 2 November 24
Kengo	12:46
Keita Yano	Sub
Hideyoshi Kamitani	12:14
Hikaru Sato	Sub
Koji Iwamoto	Pin
Yuya Susumu	7:03
Daichi Hashimoto	TKO
Kohei Sato	5:52

Semifinals; November 24
Keita Yano	11:02
Hikaru Sato	Sub
Koji Iwamoto	15:02
Daichi Hashimoto	Pin

Final; November 24
Hikaru Sato	Sub
Daichi Hashimoto	18:18

=== 2026 ===
Ryūkon Cup 2026
- Promotion: Tenryu Project
- Date: November 21, 2026
- City: Tokyo, Japan
- Venue: Shin-Kiba 1st Ring

Ryūkon Cup chronology
← Previous; 2025	Next → —

The sixth Ryūkon Cup was held over two shows on November 21, 2026, at Shin-Kiba 1st Ring in Tokyo.

Round 1 November 21
Koji Iwamoto	Pin
Mizuki Watase	2:37
Kenichiro Arai	8:00
Hideyoshi Kamitani	Pin
Kohei Sato	Pin
Kazumasa Yoshida	11:05
Ali Najima	10:42
Satsuki Nagao	Pin
Vent Vert Jack	Pin
Ayumu Honda	8:12
Masayuki Kono	11:34
Keita Yano	Pin
Daichi Hashimoto	Countout
Masaaki Mochizuki	13:12
Sushi	6:47
Takuro Niki	Pin

Round 2 November 21
Koji Iwamoto	Pin
Hideyoshi Kamitani	13:50
Kohei Sato	7:15
Satsuki Nagao	Pin
Vent Vert Jack	Pin
Keita Yano	10:46
Daichi Hashimoto	8:47
Takuro Niki	Pin

Semifinals; November 21
Koji Iwamoto	Pin
Satsuki Nagao	13:21
Vent Vert Jack	7:08
Takuro Niki	Pin

Final; November 21
Koji Iwamoto	Pin
Takuro Niki	14:26

== See also ==
- Tenryu Project
- Annual elimination tournaments in Japan:
  - King of DDT Tournament
  - New Japan Cup
  - Ōdō Tournament
  - Tennōzan
