= Oji Shiiba =

Japanese professional wrestler

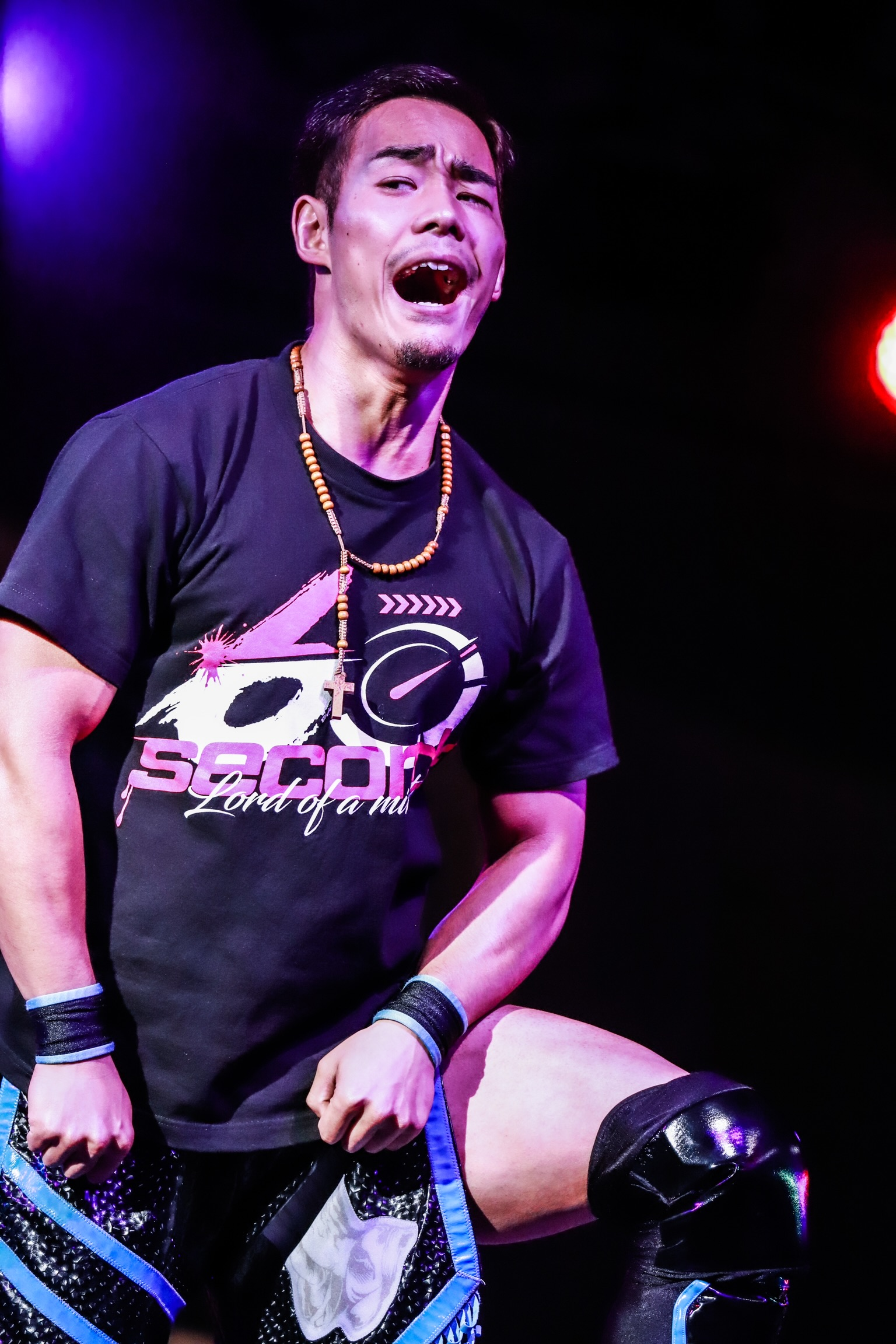
- Shiiba in November 2022

Personal information
- Born: July 14, 1996 (age 30) Aso, Japan
- Relative: Kotoka (brother)

Professional wrestling career
- Ring names: Oji Shiiba; Suzaku
- Billed height: 166 cm (5 ft 5 in)
- Billed weight: 70 kg (154 lb)
- Debut: December 8, 2017

Oji Shiiba (椎葉 旺詩, Shība Ōji; ring name: 椎葉 おうじ) (born July 14, 1996) is a Japanese professional wrestler. He currently competes as a freelancer, predominantly for Osaka Pro Wrestling (OPW), where he is a current Osaka Light Heavyweight Champion in his first reign and is believed to be performing under ring name mask as a Suzaku, He is also makes appearances on the Tenryu Project. He is best known for his tenure in Dragon Gate.

== Professional wrestling career ==
=== Dragon Gate (2017–2020) ===
Shiiba made his professional wrestling debut for Dragon Gate at NEX Sanctuary.160 on December 8, 2017, in a singles match against Shun Skywalker, which he lost. He appeared at Gate of Destiny 2019, one of Dragon Gate's signature events, where he competed in a ten-man battle royal won by Dragon Dia and also featuring Ho Ho Lun, Jimmy, Kagetora, Kanjyuro Matsuyama, Mondai Ryu, Punch Tominaga, Stalker Ichikawa and Shachihoko Boy. His final appearance for the promotion took place on June 13, 2020, during the first night of the Rainbow Gate 2020 series, where he teamed with Jason Lee and U-T in a losing effort against Ho Ho Lun, Kota Minoura and Yosuke♡Santa Maria in a six-man tag team match.

=== Freelancing (2021–present) ===
==== Dove Pro Wrestling (2021–2023) ====
After taking a year-and-a-half hiatus from professional wrestling, Shiiba returned to in-ring competition at Dove Pro's Bump Bump Revolution 17 on December 18, 2021, where he was defeated by Kohei Kinoshita. On February 18, 2023, at a Dove Pro house show, he defeated Naoki Tanizaki to win the Independent World Junior Heavyweight Championship, bringing the title under the Dove Pro banner. On May 31, 2023, at Indie Junior Festival: We Are All Alive 2, an independent event produced by Hikaru Sato, Shiiba lost the title to Yasu Urano, but regained it later that same night. He vacated the title on August 30 after announcing another hiatus from competition in order to recover from a knee injury.

==== Tenryu Project (2022–present) ====
Shiiba made his debut for Tenryu Project at Osaka Crush Night 2022 on April 2, where he teamed with Kazumasa Yoshida in a losing effort against Leona and Kengo. He continued to appear in the promotion’s Crush Night series, including a show on June 4, 2022, where he teamed with Tsubasa and "brother" Yasshi in a six-man tag team match, losing to Naoki Tanizaki, Toru, and Yusuke Kodama. On November 12, 2022, at Wrestle and Romance Vol. 8, Shiiba won a battle royal featuring opponents such as Drew Parker, Tomato Kaji, Kohei Sato, Masayuki Kono, Kouki Iwasaki, Sushi, and Mizuki Watase. At Wrestle and Romance Vol. 11 on March 26, 2023, he teamed with Takuro Niki to defeat Kenichiro Arai and Rey Paloma, winning the International Junior Heavyweight Tag Team Championship.

==== Gleat (2022–2023) ====
Shiiba made his debut for Gleat at Face-Off: Access 2 TDCH 2022 on June 5, where he was defeated by El Lindaman. He continued to make occasional appearances for the promotion, including at G Prowrestling Ver. 33 on September 10, 2022, where he teamed with The Rule (Ayato Yoshida and Shigehiro Irie) in a losing effort against Bulk Orchestra (Kazma Sakamoto, Quiet Storm, and Ryuichi Kawakami). Toward the end of 2022, Shiiba joined the 60 Seconds stable. At Ver. EX Face-Off: Access 2 TDCH 2023 on June 7, 2023, he teamed with stablemates Jun Tonsho and Keiichi Sato in a six-man tag team match, losing to Black Generation International (Kotaro Suzuki and Yutani) and Emperador Azteca.

==== All Japan Pro Wrestling (2022–2023) ====
Shiiba began competing for All Japan Pro Wrestling (AJPW) in 2022. He made his first appearance at Champions Night 4: 50th Anniversary Tour on June 19, 2022, where he defeated Ryo Inoue. In 2023, he took part in the Junior Tag League, teaming with Inoue and earning two points in total. During the tournament, they faced the teams of Black Generation International (Kaito Ishida and Kotaro Suzuki), Zennichi Shin Jidai (Atsuki Aoyagi and Rising Hayato), Naoki Tanizaki and Naruki Doi, and Dan Tamura and Hikaru Sato.

==== Osaka Pro Wrestling (2024–present) ====
Since October 2024, a masked wrestler known as Suzaku—whose name is inspired by the Vermilion Bird from Chinese mythology—has competed regularly in Osaka Pro Wrestling. While his identity has not been officially confirmed, it is widely speculated to be Oji Shiiba, due to similarities in in-ring style, physique and of the timing of his appearances. On December 29, at Excalibur 2024, Suzaku unsuccessfully challenged Ryuya Matsufusa for the Osaka Light Heavyweight Championship. He entered the Osaka Tag Festival on February 23, 2025, teaming with Hub; the duo advanced to the semi-finals, where they were eliminated by Aran Sano and Tigers Mask. On May 24, Suzaku entered the fourth edition of the Osaka Light Heavyweight Tournament, defeating Ultimate Spider Jr. in the first round. After advancing past Tiiida in the semi-finals, he defeated Ryuya Matsufusa in the final on May 25 to win the tournament.

== Personal life ==
His real life brother is Kotoka who wrestled for Dragon Gate from 2009 to 2018.

== Championships and accomplishments ==
- Dove Pro-Wrestling
  - Independent World Junior Heavyweight Championship (2 times)
- Hard Hit
  - 1st Break Through Tournament (2022)
- Osaka Pro Wrestling
  - Osaka Light Heavyweight Championship (1 time, current)
  - Osaka Pro 4th Light Heavyweight Tournament (2025, 2026)
  - Osaka Tag Festival (2026) – with Tiiida
- Tenryu Project
  - International Junior Heavyweight Tag Team Championship (1 time) – with Takuro Niki
