= Osaka Light Heavyweight Championship =

Professional wrestling championship

- The Osaka Light Heavyweight Championship belt

Details
- Promotion: Osaka Pro Wrestling
- Date established: March 2022
- Current champion: Suzaku
- Date won: July 5, 2026
Statistics
- Longest reign: Tigers Mask (497 days)
- Oldest champion: Tigers Mask (46 years, 60 days)
- Youngest champion: Ryuya Matsufusa (25 years, 36 days)
- Heaviest champion: Tigers Mask (85 kg (187 lb))
- Lightest champion: Suzaku (70 kg (150 lb))

The Osaka Light Heavyweight Championship (Japanese: 大阪ライトヘビー級王座, Hepburn: Ōsaka Raito Hebī-kyū Ōza) is a professional wrestling light heavyweight championship owned by the Osaka Pro Wrestling (OPW) promotion. Only wrestlers under the light heavyweight weight-limit may hold the championship.

There have been a total of five reigns shared between five different champions. The current champion is Suzaku who is in his first reign.

== History ==
The title was announced in March 2022 and the belt, unveiled on April 30, was awarded to Tigers Mask after he won an eight-man tournament on July 31.

=== Inaugural tournament ===
Round 1 June 26
Ares	N/A
Billyken Kid	Forfeit
Ryuya Matsufusa	19:37
Tigers Mask	Pin
Ultimate Spider Jr.	25:36
Yuto Kikuchi	Pin
Takoyakida	N/A
Tsubasa	Forfeit

Semifinals; July 31
Billyken Kid	Sub
Tigers Mask	19:40
Yuto Kikuchi	Pin
Tsubasa	20:35

Final; July 31
Tigers Mask	Pin
Yuto Kikuchi	25:20

== Reigns ==
Key
No.	Overall reign number
Reign	Reign number for the specific champion
Days	Number of days held
Defenses	Number of successful defenses
+	Current reign is changing daily

No.	Champion	Championship change			Reign statistics			Notes	Ref.
No.	Champion	Date	Event	Location	Reign	Days	Defenses	Notes	Ref.
Osaka Pro Wrestling (OPW)
1	Tigers Mask	July 31, 2022	Osaka Light Heavyweight Inaugural Championship Tournament	Osaka, Japan	1	497	4	Defeated Yuto Kikuchi in the finals of an eight-man tournament to win the title.	
2	Ryuya Matsufusa	December 10, 2023	Excalibur	Osaka, Japan	1	399	5		
3	Yasutaka Oosera	January 12, 2025	Osaka Pro New Year Special 2025	Osaka, Japan	1	329	4		
4	Ultimate Spider Jr.	December 7, 2025	Excalibur 2025	Osaka, Japan	1	210	2		
5	Suzaku	July 5, 2026	Osaka Pro Summer Battle 2026	Osaka, Japan	1	76+	2		

== See also ==
- Professional wrestling in Japan
