= Toru Matsunaga =

Japanese professional wrestler

Toru
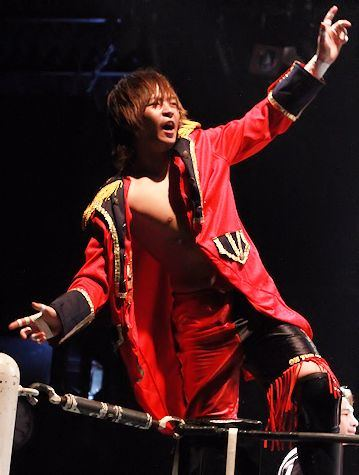
- Matsunaga in 2012

Personal information
- Born: 25 February 1991 (age 35) Katano, Japan

Professional wrestling career
- Ring name: Toru Matsunaga Agu Matsunaga Toru
- Billed height: 180 cm (5 ft 11 in)
- Billed weight: 86 kg (190 lb)
- Trained by: Hub
- Debut: 2010

Toru Matsunaga (松永透, Matsunaga Tōru; born 25 February 1991) is a Japanese professional wrestler. He currently works as a freelancer for Osaka Pro Wrestling, Tenryu Project and Dotonbori Pro Wrestling.

== Professional wrestling career ==
=== Japanese independent circuit (2010–present) ===
Matsunaga made his professional wrestling debut in Pro-Wrestling Shi-En in early 2010. During the early years of his career, he also worked for various promotions of the Japanese independent wrestling scene such as Dove Pro Wrestling, Dotonbori Pro Wrestling, Guts World Pro Wrestling and VKF Pro Wrestling. Matsunaga made sporadic appearances for All Japan Pro Wrestling. On the first night of the AJPW Summer Action Series 2019 on 17 July 2019, Matsunaga won a number one contendership battle royal for the Gaora TV Championship featuring various notable opponents such as Psycho, Survival Tobita and Tetsuya Izuchi. Ten days later, Matsunaga lost the title match against the retaining Yoshi Tatsu.

==== Dotonbori Pro Wrestling (2013–2023) ====
Matsunaga had a ten-year tenure with Dotonbori Pro Wrestling. During his time with the promotion, he won the WDW Championship and the WDW Tag Team Championship alongside his "Super Sonic" tag team partner Real Inunakin one time each. He also won the 2017 edition of the Dotonbori Saikyou Otoko Tournament.

==== Tenryu Project (2021–2022) ====
Between 2021 and 2022, Matsunaga had the Tenryu Project as his main battlefield. He won the Tenryu Project International Junior Heavyweight Championship at Osaka Crush Night 2022 on 12 February by defeating Kengo. Additionally, Matsunaga won the inaugural edition of the Ryūkon Cup in 2021 by defeating Kohei Sato in the first rounds, Hikaru Sato in the second, Kengo in the semifinals and Keita Yano in the final.

==== Osaka Pro Wrestling (2022–present) ====
Matsunaga made his Osaka Pro Wrestling debut at Osaka Pro: New Osaka Pro Pre-Launch Battle, an event promoted on 6 March 2022, where he teamed up with Yuto Kikuchi in a losing effort against Takoyakida and Ultimate Spider Jr. in tag team competition.

During his tenure with the promotion, Matsunaga won the Osaka Tag Team Championship on one occasion alongside "Rogue Nation" stablemate Goliath at Osaka Pro Excalibur 2023 on 21 May after defeating Takosupa (Takoyakida and Ultimate Spider Jr.). The following year, he won the Osaka Pro Wrestling Championship, the promotion's top achievement on, 29 December 2024 by defeating Zeus at Osaka Pro Excalibur.

Matsunaga competed in one of the promotion's signature events, the Tennozan Tournament, making his first appearance in the 2022 edition where he defeated Ryuya Matsufusa in the first rounds, then fell short to Yuto Kikuchi in the second ones. He scored his best result when he won the 2024 edition of the competition in which he defeated Hub in the first rounds, Zeus in the second rounds, Yasutaka Oosera in the semifinals and Shigehiro Irie in the finals.

== Championships and accomplishments ==
- Dotonbori Pro Wrestling
  - WDW Championship (1 time)
  - WDW Tag Team Championship (1 time) – with Real Inunakin
  - Dotonbori Saikyou Otoko Tournament (2017)
- Dove Pro Wrestling
  - Dove Pro Tag Team Championship (1 time) – with Kazuaki Mihara
- Osaka Pro Wrestling
  - Osaka Tag Team Championship (1 time) – with Goliath
  - Osaka Pro Wrestling Championship (1 time)
  - Osaka Tag Festival (2023) – with Kazuaki Mihara
  - Tennozan (2024)
- Pro-Wrestling Shi-En
  - Pro-Wrestling Shi-En Tag Team Championship (1 time) – with Jun Masaoka
- Real Guts Army
  - CCW Canadian Heavyweight Championship (1 time)
- Tenryu Project
  - Tenryu Project International Junior Heavyweight Championship (1 time)
  - Ryūkon Cup (2021)
- Total Triumph Team
  - TTT Indie Unified Openweight Championship (1 time)
  - GWC 6-Man Tag Team Championship (1 time) – with Akiyori Takizawa and Tetsuya Goto
  - GWC Tag Team Championship (1 time) – with Fuminori Abe
- VKF Pro Wrestling
  - VKF King of Wrestle Naniwa Championship (2 times)
