= Evolution (All Japan Pro Wrestling) =

Professional wrestling stable

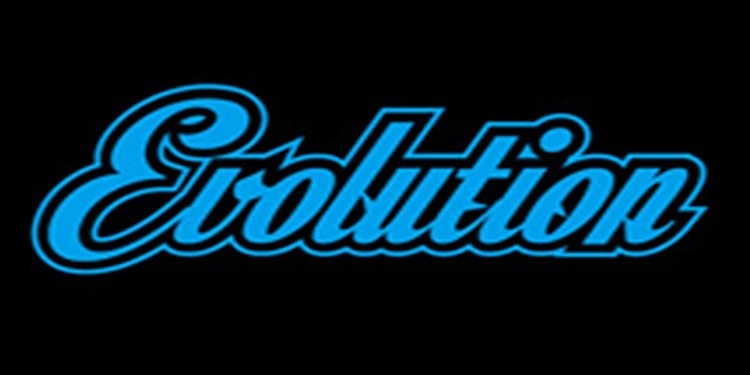
- The logo of Evolution

Stable
- Members: See below
- Names: Evolution; Last Revolution
- Debut: October 21, 2012 (as Last Revolution); September 23, 2013 (as Evolution)
- Disbanded: August 25, 2022
- Years active: 2012–2022

Evolution was a professional wrestling stable in the All Japan Pro Wrestling (AJPW) promotion. Originally started as a tag team named Last Revolution (ラスト・レボリューション, Rasuto Reboryūshon) by Joe Doering and Suwama in October 2012, it was later turned into a stable when Kaz Hayashi, Shuji Kondo and Yasufumi Nakanoue joined the two. The stable was disbanded in June 2013, when Hayashi, Kondo and Nakanoue left AJPW, but Doering and Suwama came back together under the new name Evolution the following September and recruited Hikaru Sato as the stable's third member in February 2014. Suwama has held the Triple Crown Heavyweight Champion twice and Doering once as representatives of the stable. The two are also former one-time World Tag Team Champions and won the 2013 World's Strongest Tag Determination League. In July 2014, Atsushi Aoki joined Evolution, bringing the World Junior Heavyweight Championship to the stable with him. As part of Evolution, Aoki and Sato formed a tag team named Hentai Jieitai (変態自衛隊; lit. "Pervert Self-Defense Forces"), becoming two-time All Asia Tag Team Champions and three-time winners of the Jr. Tag Battle of Glory tournament.

== History ==
=== Last Revolution (2012–2013) ===
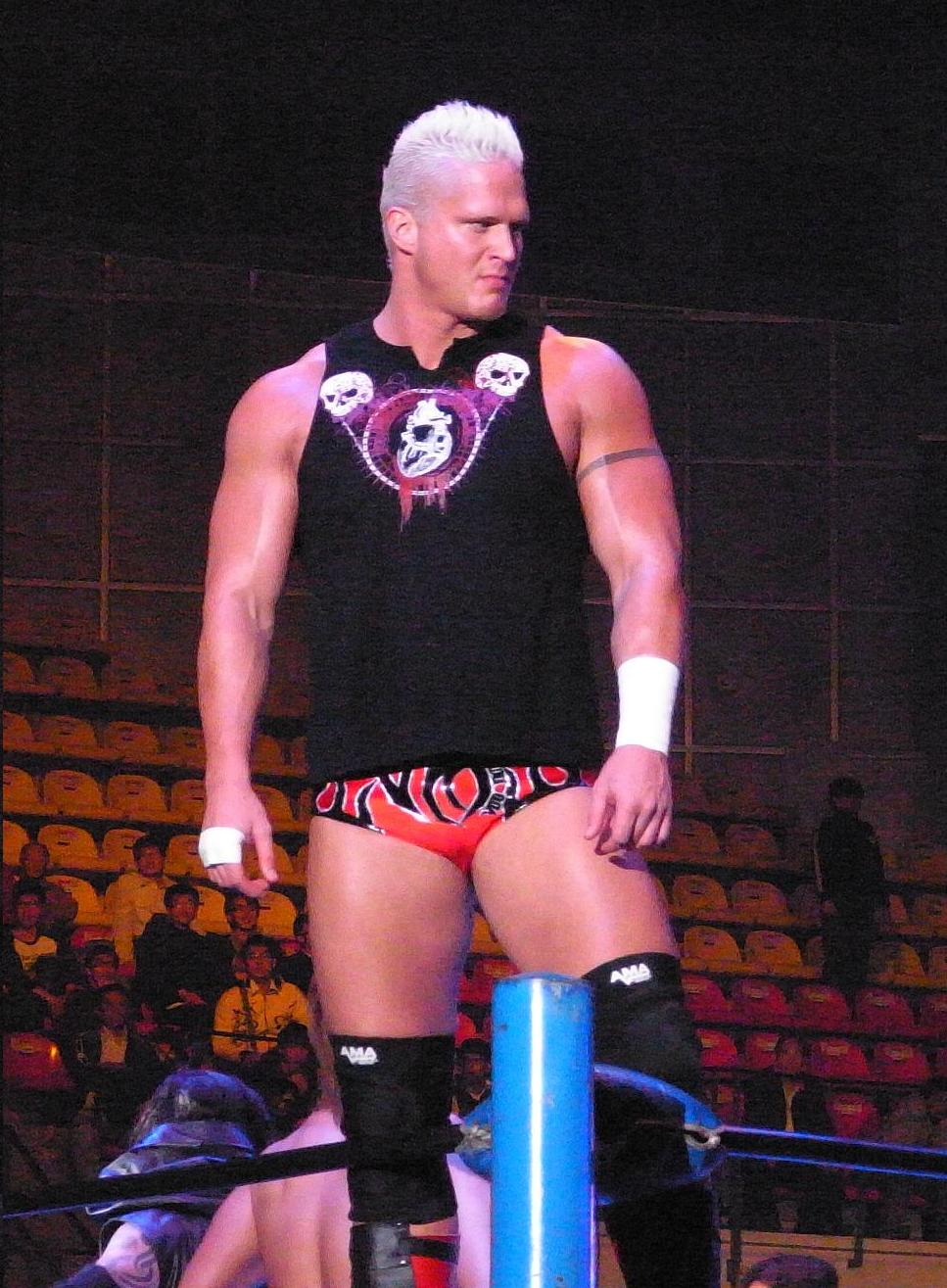
Joe Doering

On October 21, 2012, two longtime "generational rivals", Joe Doering and Suwama, faced each other in a match, which ended in a draw, after both men were counted out of the ring. After Suwama successfully pleaded for the match to be restarted, it ended in another draw less than three minutes later, when neither man was able to continue. Following the match, the two men shook hands, before Suwama announced that he was going to be taking part in the upcoming World's Strongest Tag Determination League and nominated Doering as his partner. On November 13, Suwama held a press conference to announce that he and Doering had come up with a name for their new tag team, "Last Revolution" (L/R), combining the names of the finishing moves of the two men; Suwama's Last Ride and Doering's Revolution Bomb. In the tournament, which ran from November 17 to 30 and was contested for the vacant World Tag Team Championship, Last Revolution made it all the way to the finals, before losing to Get Wild (Manabu Soya and Takao Omori).

On March 4, 2013, Suwama announced that in order to counter the momentum of the new Burning stable, Last Revolution had recruited a new member, Shuji Kondo. Before the end of the month, Kondo's longtime tag team partner Kaz Hayashi also joined Last Revolution, while veteran wrestler Masahiro Chono acted as an unofficial advisor for members of the stable. On March 17, Suwama defeated Masakatsu Funaki for AJPW's top title, the Triple Crown Heavyweight Championship, bringing Last Revolution its first title. On April 29, Hayashi and Kondo faced Sushi and Yasufumi Nakanoue in a tag team match. Despite Hayashi pinning Nakanoue for the win, he and Kondo afterwards offered the rookie wrestler a spot in Last Revolution. Nakanoue immediately accepted the offer, thus becoming the stable's fifth member. However, the following June, after Nobuo Shiraishi took over as the new president of AJPW, Keiji Mutoh quit the promotion and was joined by wrestlers loyal to him, which included Hayashi, Kondo and Nakanoue, leading to Suwama announcing that Last Revolution would be disbanding following the June 30 AJPW event.

=== Evolution (2013–2022) ===
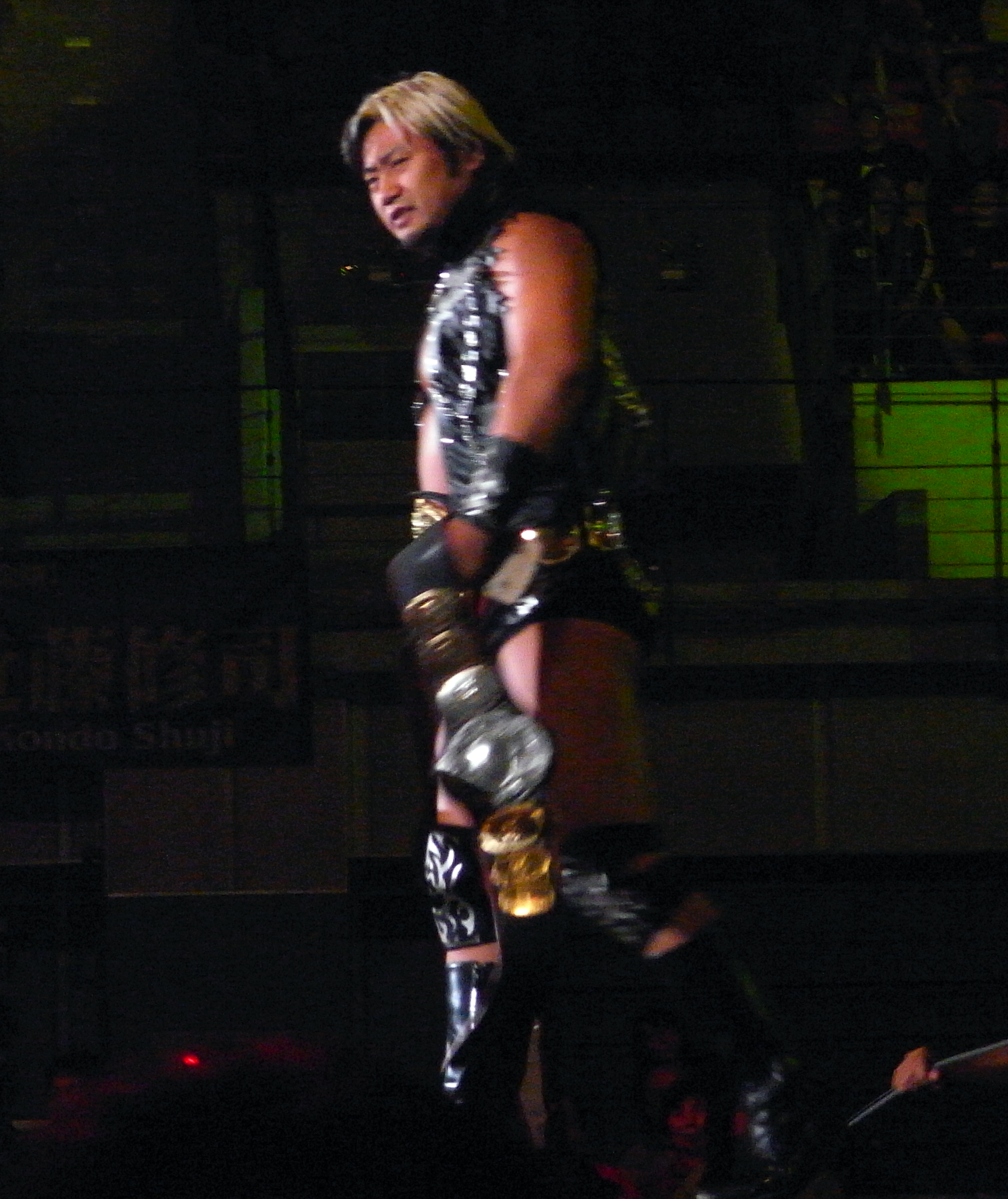
Suwama

On September 23, 2013, it was announced that Doering and Suwama were coming back together full time under the new team name "Evolution", challenging the reigning World Tag Team Champions, Burning's Go Shiozaki and Jun Akiyama, to a title match. The match took place on October 22 and saw Evolution defeat Burning to become the new World Tag Team Champions. With the win, Suwama, now holding the three Triple Crown Heavyweight Championship belts and two World Tag Team Championship belts, became AJPW's first "Quintuple Crown Champion" in 12 years. However, just five days later, Suwama lost the Triple Crown Heavyweight Championship to Akebono. On December 8, Doering and Suwama solidified their spot as AJPW's top tag team by defeating Xceed's Go Shiozaki and Kento Miyahara in the finals to win the 2013 World's Strongest Tag Determination League. On February 16, 2014, Evolution was once again turned into a stable, when Suwama accepted Hikaru Sato's direct appeal and made him Evolution's third member, tasking him with bringing the World Junior Heavyweight Championship over to the stable. Suwama and Doering's reign as the World Tag Team Champions came to an end on June 28, when they lost the title to Wild Burning (Jun Akiyama and Takao Omori). However, the very next day, Suwama defeated Omori to recapture the Triple Crown Heavyweight Championship.

On July 27, after successfully defending the World Junior Heavyweight Championship against Hikaru Sato, Atsushi Aoki announced he was joining Evolution. Later that same event, Evolution's two original members faced off in a match, where Doering defeated Suwama to win the Triple Crown Heavyweight Championship for the first time. On October 22, Aoki and Sato won the 2014 Jr. Tag Battle of Glory, defeating Último Dragón and Yoshinobu Kanemaru in the finals. On January 3, 2015, Doering lost the Triple Crown Heavyweight Championship to Go Shiozaki in his fourth defense. On March 27, Aoki lost the World Junior Heavyweight Championship to Kotaro Suzuki. On October 23, Aoki and Sato won their second Jr. Tag Battle of Glory in a row by winning the round-robin tournament with a record of three wins and one loss. In late 2015, following Go Shiozaki's departure from AJPW, Suwama offered his tag team partner Kento Miyahara a spot in Evolution. Though Miyahara turned down the offer, he agreed to team with Suwama in the 2015 World's Strongest Tag Determination League. After winning the tournament, Miyahara expressed interest in continuing to team up with Suwama, but was attacked by Suwama, who instead announced Naoya Nomura as the newest member of Evolution.

On January 2, 2016, Suwama defeated Jun Akiyama to regain the Triple Crown Heavyweight Championship. However, Suwama was stripped of the title only ten days later after suffering an achilles tendon rupture. On February 21, Aoki defeated Sato in the finals to win the 2016 Jr. Battle of Glory and the vacant World Junior Heavyweight Championship. Aoki went on to lose the title to Sato on June 19. On July 16, the second Super Tiger joined the stable. On July 24, Aoki and Sato defeated Isami Kodaka and Yuko Miyamoto at a Big Japan Pro Wrestling (BJW) event to win the All Asia Tag Team Championship, bringing it back to AJPW. On July 30, Naoya Nomura left Evolution to join Kento Miyahara's Nextream stable. On August 28, Sato lost the World Junior Heavyweight Championship to Soma Takao in his second defense at DDT Pro-Wrestling's Ryōgoku Peter Pan 2016. On September 19, Suwama defeated Zeus in the finals to win the 2016 Ōdō Tournament. On November 17, Aoki and Sato won their third Jr. Tag Battle of Glory in a row by defeating Soma Takao and Yuma Aoyagi in a playoff match. On November 27, Aoki and Sato lost the All Asia Tag Team Championship to veteran wrestlers Atsushi Onita and Masanobu Fuchi, who became the 100th champions in the title's history.

On January 2, 2017, Joe Doering returned to AJPW after being sidelined for 18 months due to a brain tumor, teaming with Evolution stablemates Hikaru Sato and Suwama in a six-man tag team match, where they defeated Jake Lee, Kento Miyahara and Naoya Nomura. On April 28, Sato defeated Keisuke Ishii to win the World Junior Heavyweight Championship for the second time. On June 20, Aoki and Sato defeated Onita and Fuchi to regain the All Asia Tag Team Championship. On July 30, Sato lost the World Junior Heavyweight Championship to Tajiri in his fifth defense. That same day, Doering quit Evolution, which was followed by Sato also quitting the stable just four days later after losing to Suwama in a grappling match. Suwama and Doering immediately started feuding with each another, with Doering vowing to kill his former stable. On September 23, Suwama first defeated Doering in the semifinals and then Shuji Ishikawa in the finals to win his second Ōdō Tournament in a row. On October 9, Suwama defeated Kento Miyahara to regain the Triple Crown Heavyweight Championship. He lost the title to Doering on October 21.

On June 3, 2019, the World Junior Heavyweight Champion Atsushi Aoki died in a motorcycle accident.

== Members ==
*	Founding member
L	Leader

=== Evolution ===
Member		Tenure
Atsushi Aoki		July 27, 2014 – June 3, 2019 (Note: Aoki was killed in a motorcycle accident on June 3, 2019, but was still regarded as a member of the stable on the official website.)
Dan Tamura		July 13, 2020 – present
Hikaru Sato		February 16, 2014 – August 3, 2017; February 8, 2023 – present
Joe Doering	*	September 23, 2013 – July 30, 2017
Naoya Nomura		December 6, 2015 – July 30, 2016
Super Tiger II		July 16, 2016 – present
Suwama	* L	September 23, 2013 – May 22, 2022; June 9, 2023 – present
Yusuke Okada		February 3, 2018 – July 13, 2020

=== Last Revolution ===
Member		Tenure
Joe Doering	*	October 21, 2012 – June 30, 2013
Kaz Hayashi		March 23, 2013 – June 30, 2013
Shuji Kondo		March 4, 2013 – June 30, 2013
Suwama	* L	October 21, 2012 – June 30, 2013
Yasufumi Nakanoue		April 29, 2013 – June 30, 2013

== Championships and accomplishments ==
- All Japan Pro Wrestling
  - All Asia Tag Team Championship (4 times) – Aoki and Sato (2), Tamura and Sato (2)
  - Triple Crown Heavyweight Championship (6 times) – Suwama (5) and Doering (1)
  - World Junior Heavyweight Championship (4 times) – Aoki (2) and Sato (2)
  - World Tag Team Championship (1 time) – Doering and Suwama
  - AJPW TV Six-Man Tag Team Championship (1 time, current) – Tamura, Suzuki and Suwama
  - Jr. Battle of Glory (2016) – Aoki
  - Jr. Tag Battle of Glory (2014, 2015, 2016) – Aoki and Sato
  - Jr. Tag Battle of Glory (2019) – Sato and Okada
  - Jr. Tag Battle of Glory (2020) – Sato and Tamura
  - Ōdō Tournament (2016, 2017) – Suwama
  - World's Strongest Tag Determination League (2013) – Doering and Suwama
- Tenryu Project
  - United National Tag Team Championship (1 time) – Suwama and Tamura

== See also ==
- All Japan Pro Wrestling
- Puroresu
