= Tenryu Project =

Japanese professional wrestling promotion

- Founded: 2010; (re-established) November 15, 2020
- Style: Puroresu
- Headquarters: Tokyo, Japan
- Founder: Genichiro Tenryu
- Owner: Genichiro Tenryu
- Predecessor: Wrestle Association R
- Website: https://tenryuproject.jp

Tenryu Project (Japanese: 天龍プロジェクト, Hepburn: Tenryū Purojekuto) is an independent Japanese professional wrestling promotion. The promotion was founded by and is owned by puroresu legend Genichiro Tenryu, who has owned and operated it since its creation in 2010.

== History ==
Tenryu Project is the successor to Genichiro Tenryu's WAR promotion that ran from 1992 until 2000 as well as Tenryu's Super World of Sports (SWS) that existed from 1990 until 1992. Tenryu Project doesn't have wrestlers on full-time contracts, instead producing shows with freelancers and working with other promotions. After Tenryu's in-ring retirement match in 2015, Tenryu Project stopped running shows. Five years later, a special anniversary show was held in 2020 titled Kakumei Denshō (革命伝承; lit. "Revolutionary Tradition").

Tenryu Project was re-established with a tour in 2021 titled "Survive the Revolution".

== Roster ==
Ring name	Real name	Notes
"brother" Yasshi	Yasushi Tsujimoto	Signed to Dove Pro-Wrestling
Daichi Hashimoto	Daichi Hashimoto	Signed to Big Japan Pro Wrestling
Fujita	Minoru Fujita	Freelancer affiliated with Tokyo Gurentai
Hideyoshi Kamitani	Hideyoshi Kamitani	Signed to Big Japan Pro Wrestling
Hikaru Sato	Hiroaki Sato	Signed to Pancrase Mission
Hub	Yuto Kigawa	Freelancer
Jun Masaoka	Jun Masaoka	Freelancer
Jun Saito	Jun Saito	Signed to All Japan Pro Wrestling
Kamikaze	Shoichi Maruyama	Freelancer
Kazuki Hashimoto	Kazuki Hashimoto	Signed to Big Japan Pro Wrestling
Kazumasa Yoshida	Kazumasa Yoshida	Signed to Big Japan Pro Wrestling
Keita Yano	Keita Yano	Signed to Professional Wrestling Wallabee
Kengo	Kengo Nishimura	International Junior Heavyweight Tag Team Champion; WAR World 6-Man Tag Team Champion; Freelancer
Kengo Mashimo	Kengo Mashimo	Signed to Action Advance Pro Wrestling
Kenichiro Arai	Kenichiro Arai	Signed to Dragongate
Kikutaro	Mitsunobu Kikuzawa	Freelancer
Kohei Sato	Kohei Sato	United National Heavyweight Tag Team Champion; Freelancer
Koji Iwamoto	Koji Iwamoto	International Junior Heavyweight Champion; Freelancer
Kouki Iwasaki	Kouki Iwasaki	Freelancer
Leona	Reona Fujinami	Signed to Dradition
Mammoth Sasaki	Yoshinori Sasaki	Signed to Pro Wrestling Freedoms
Masayuki Kono	Masayuki Kono	WAR World 6-Man Tag Team Champion; United National Heavyweight Tag Team Champion; Freelancer
Mazada	Kazuhiro Masada	Freelancer affiliated with Tokyo Gurentai
Minoru Suzuki	Minoru Suzuki	Signed to Pancrase Mission
Mizuki Watase	Mizuki Watase	Signed to Ganbare☆Pro-Wrestling
Naoki Tanizaki	Naoki Tanizaki	Signed to Dove Pro-Wrestling
Oji Shiiba	Oji Shiiba	Freelancer
Rei Saito	Rei Saito	Signed to All Japan Pro Wrestling
Rey Paloma	Jiro Kumagae	Signed to Dove Pro-Wrestling
Ricky Fuji	Masanori Morimura	Signed to Action Advance Pro Wrestling
Ryoma Tsukamoto	Ryoma Tsukamoto	Signed to All Japan Pro Wrestling
Ryuki Honda	Ryuki Honda	Signed to All Japan Pro Wrestling
Shigehiro Irie	Shigehiro Irie	Freelancer
Shota	Shota Suzuki	Signed to Ganbare☆Pro-Wrestling
Sushi	Akira Kawabata	Freelancer
Takuro Niki	Unknown	Signed to Action Advance Pro Wrestling
Tatsuhito Takaiwa	Tatsuhito Takaiwa	Freelancer
Tatsuya Hanami	Unknown	Signed to Action Advance Pro Wrestling
Toru	Toru Matsunaga	Signed to Total Triumph Team Pro-Wrestling
Towa Iwasaki	Towa Iwasaki	Signed to Pro-Wrestling Burst
Yuji Hino	Yusuke Hino	Freelancer
Yusuke Kodama	Yusuke Kodama	Freelancer
Yuya Susumu	Yuya Susumu	International Junior Heavyweight Tag Team Champion; WAR World 6-Man Tag Team Champion; Freelancer

=== Notable guests/alumni ===
- Genichiro Tenryu
- Kuuga
- Nosawa Rongai
- Ryuichi Kawakami
- Taru

== Championships and accomplishments ==
=== Current championships ===
As of November 22, 2026, Tenryu Project has four recognized championships, the first three revived from WAR.

Championship	Current champion(s)	Reign	Date won	Days held	Location	Notes	Ref.
International Junior Heavyweight Championship	Masaaki Mochizuki	5	September 19, 2026	64	Tokyo, Japan	Defeated Keita Yano at Reborn for the Future Vol. 4.	
International Junior Heavyweight Tag Team Championship	Keita Yano and Ayumu Honda	1 (3, 1)	October 3, 2026	50	Tokyo, Japan	Defeated Masaaki Mochizuki and Kenichiro Arai in the final of a four-team tournament to win the vacant title at IJ Tag Team & WAR World 6-Man Tag Team New Champions 1-Day Tournament.	
WAR World 6-Man Tag Team Championship	Kohei Sato, Takuro Niki and Satsuki Nagao	1 (2, 1, 1)	October 3, 2026	50	Tokyo, Japan	Defeated Tatsuhito Takaiwa, Daichi Hashimoto and Mizuki Watase in the final of a four-team tournament to win the vacant title at IJ Tag Team & WAR World 6-Man Tag Team New Champions 1-Day Tournament.	
United National Heavyweight Tag Team Championship	Koji Iwamoto and Hideyoshi Kamitani	1	December 20, 2025	337	Tokyo, Japan	Defeated Kohei Sato and Masayuki Kono at Tenryu Genichiro Triple Year Crowdfunding Event.	

=== Tournaments ===
Accomplishment	Last winner(s)	Date won	Location	Notes
Ryūkon Cup	Koji Iwamoto	November 21, 2026	Tokyo, Japan	Defeated Takuro Niki in the tournament final.

== Notable shows ==
=== First Show ===
The first show ever held under the "Tenryu Project" banner took place on April 19, 2010 in the Shinjuku Face arena in Tokyo, Japan.

No.	Results	Stipulations	Times
1	Mitsuo Momota defeated Masao Orihara	Singles match	09:15
2	Bear Fukuda defeated Chango	Singles match	08:54
3	Kyoko Inoue and Munenori Sawa defeated Keita Yano and Manami Toyota	Tag team match	14:33
4	Masaaki Mochizuki defeated Naoki Tanizaki and Susumu Yokosuka	Three-way match for the vacant WAR International Junior Heavyweight Championship	22:13
5	Genichiro Tenryu and Sanshiro Takagi defeated Arashi and Dick Togo	Tag team match	20:03

=== Genichiro Tenryu Retirement: Revolution Final Tour ===
Genichiro Tenryu started his retirement tour with a show at the Shin-Kiba 1st Ring arena on March 6, 2015.

No.	Results	Stipulations	Times
1	Shota defeated Mitsunobu Kikuzawa	Singles match	09:20
2	Buki defeated Dragon Joker	Singles match	07:40
3	Kazuki Hashimoto defeated Ryuji Hijikata	Singles match	10:18
4	Great Kojika and Ryuichi Kawakami defeated Nosawa Rongai and Ricky Fuji	Tag team match	12:22
5	Kengo (c) defeated Choden Senshi Battle Ranger	Singles match for the UWA World Junior Heavyweight Championship	12:11
6	Arashi and Genichiro Tenryu defeated Kotaro Nasu and Toru Sugiura	Tag team match	10:11
(c) / – the champion(s) heading into the match

=== Genichiro Tenryu Retirement: Revolution Final Tour in Shinjuku ===
This event took place on April 3, 2015.

No.	Results	Stipulations	Times
1	Ricky Fuji defeated Mitsunobu Kikuzawa	Singles match	08:11
2	Kazuki Hashimoto and Ryuji Hijikata defeated Gamelas and Nosawa Rongai	Tag team match	12:40
3	Kengo (c) defeated Kaze	Singles match for the UWA World Junior Heavyweight Championship	11:33
4	Arashi and Great Kojika defeated the Great Kabuki and Masao Inoue	Tag team match	11:51
5	Yoshinari Ogawa defeated Dragon Joker	Singles match	16:15
6	Buki, Heddi French and Ryuichi Kawakami (c) defeated Kotaro Nasu, Shota and Toru Sugiura	Six-man tag team match for the Tenryu Project World Six Man Tag Team Championship	17:14
7	Genichiro Tenryu and Shiro Koshinaka defeated Konosuke Takeshita and Sanshiro Takagi	Tag team match	08:35
(c) / – the champion(s) heading into the match

=== Genichiro Tenryu Retirement: Revolution Final Tour in Korakuen ===
This event took place at the Korakuen Hall on September 2, 2015.

No.	Results	Stipulations	Times
1	Ricky Fuji and Great Kabuki defeated Great Kojika and Kikutaro	Tag team match	09:02
2	Kotaru Nasu defeated Dragon Joker	Singles match for the vacant UWA World Junior Heavyweight Championship	10:08
3	Kendo Kashin and Kenichiro Arai defeated Nosawa Rongai and Yoshinari Ogawa	Tag team match	10:52
4	Arashi, Kazunari Murakami and Koki Kitahara defeated Buki, Hikaru Sato and Manabu Soya	Six-man tag team match	16:49
5	Kuuga and Tomohiro Ishii defeated Minoru Fujita and Yuji Hino	Tag team match	16:55
6	Genichiro Tenryu and Katsuyori Shibata defeated Suzuki-gun (Minoru Suzuki and Takashi Iizuka)	Tag team match	20:26

=== Genichiro Tenryu Retirement: Revolution Final ===
November 15, 2015 at Ryōgoku Kokugikan, Tokyo. Last card of the promotion before the 2020 revival.

No.	Results	Stipulations	Times
1	Ricky Fuji and Sanshiro Takagi defeated Kikutaro and The Winger	Tag team match	08:41
2	Dash Chisako and Sendai Sachiko defeated Cassandra Miyagi and Meiko Satomura	Tag team match	09:29
3	Fujita, Kuuga, Onryo, Taru and Yasu Kubota defeated Dragon Joker, Gurukun Mask, Jyushin Thunder Liger, Ryota Chikuzen and Shigeno Shima	Ten-man tag team match	11:16
4	Buki, Great Kabuki and Kai defeated Great Kojika, Jun Kasai and Toru Sugiura	Six-man tag team match	08:57
5	Kendo Kashin and Yoshinari Ogawa defeated Kenichiro Arai and Nosawa Rongai	Tag team match	12:47
6	Hikaru Sato, Katsuhiko Nakajima and Kazuki Hashimoto defeated Koki Kitahara, Kotaro Nasu and Ryuji Hijikata	Six-man tag team match	13:08
7	Arashi and Shiro Koshinaka defeated Taiyo Kea and Yuto Aijima	Tag team match	09:54
8	Yoshiaki Fujiwara and Yoshihiro Takayama defeated Minoru Suzuki and Kazunari Murakami	Tag team match	13:10
9	Riki Choshu and Tomohiro Ishii defeated Akitoshi Saito and Ryuichi Kawakami	Tag team match	13:46
10	Suwama and Yuji Okabayashi defeated Kazuyuki Fujita and Daisuke Sekimoto	Tag team match	18:54
11	Kazuchika Okada defeated Genichiro Tenryu	Singles match (Tenryu's retirement match)	17:27

=== Revolutionary Tradition: Genichiro Tenryu Retirement 5th Anniversary ===
Held on November 15, 2020 at Korakuen Hall, Tokyo.

No.	Results	Stipulations	Times
1	Great Kojika and Masao Inoue defeated Ricky Fuji and Shota by submission	Tag team match	11:08
2	Onryo defeated Kenichiro Arai by pinfall	Singles match	8:50
3	Ryuji Hijikata and Chihiro Hashimoto defeated Hideyoshi Kamitani and Dash Chisako by technical knockout	Tag team match	12:50
4	Hideki Suzuki and Yuya Susumu defeated Masayuki Kono and Kotaro Nasu by pinfall	Tag team match	11:19
5	Hikaru Sato, Yuji Hino and Ryuichi Kawakami defeated Minoru Suzuki, Kengo Mashimo and Kengo by submission	Six-man tag team match	23:57
6	Genichiro Tenryu vs. Kazuchika Okada ended in a draw	Talk battle	34:43

== See also ==
- WAR
- Super World of Sports
