= Jun Masaoka =

Japanese wrestler (born 1991)

- Masaoka in January 2023

Personal information
- Born: 17 April 1991 (age 35) Toyonaka, Japan

Professional wrestling career
- Ring name: Jun Masaoka Kogal B
- Billed height: 166 cm (5 ft 5 in)
- Billed weight: 68 kg (150 lb)
- Trained by: Toru; Donguri Fujie
- Debut: 2009

Jun Masaoka (政岡純, Masaoka Jun) is a Japanese professional wrestler, He is currently working on the Japanese promotion Pro Wrestling Noah, where is a member of Team 2000X stable. He is also makes appearances on the Japanese independent scene such as Pro Wrestling Freedoms, Pro-Wrestling Shi-En, Wrestling of Darkness 666 and others.

== Professional wrestling career ==
=== Japanese independent circuit (2009–present) ===
Masaoka made his professional wrestling debut at a house show promoted by K-WEST Wrestling on November 5, 2009, where he teamed up with Dyna Mido in a losing effort against Daisuke Masaoka and Mahoroba. Throughout his career, Masaoka competed in various promotions from the Japanese independent scene such as Pro-Wrestling Shi-En, Gleat, Pro-Wrestling Basara's branch of DDT Pro-Wrestling, Wrestling of Darkness 666, Total Triumph Team (TTT) and others.

Masaoka made several appearances for New Japan Pro Wrestling. On the second night of the Destruction in Ryogoku from October 9, 2023, Masaoka teamed up with Takahiro Katori, Takeshi Masada and Kazuma Sumi and unsuccessfully competed in a ten-man tag team match won by Chaos (Yoshi-Hashi, Toru Yano and Yoh), Tiger Mask and Ryusuke Taguchi. At NJPW Death Pain Invitational on June 24, 2025, he fell short to Kosei Fujita in singles competition.

In Tenryu Project's Ryūkon Cup, Masaoka made his first appearance at the 2024 edition where he fell short to Kengo in the second rounds.

In Pro Wrestling Zero1's Tenkaichi Junior tournament, Masaoka made his first appearance at the 2022 edition, placing himself in the A block and scoring a total of ten points after competing against Shoki Kitamura, Leo Isaka, Yoshikazu Yokoyama and Astroman, failing to qualify to the finals. He unsuccessfully challenged Astroman for both the World Junior Heavyweight Championship and International Junior Heavyweight Championship on the first night of the 2022 Furinkazan.

At Masaaki Mochizuki Produce Buyuden Rei vol. 7, an event produced by Dragongate on July 23, 2025, Masaoka unsuccessfully challenged Ryoya Tanaka for the Open the Brave Gate Championship.

=== Pro-Wrestling Shi-En (2010–present) ===
Masaoka was signed to Pro-Wrestling Shi-En for almost a decade between 2010 and 2019. During his time with the promotion, he won the Pro-Wrestling Shi-En Championship on one occasion, and the Pro-Wrestling Shi-En Tag Team Championship on three separate occasions. He was part of the "Liberta" stable alongside Maro Kuriyama, Raipachi Isobe, Kirin, Hiroaki Taniguchi.

=== Pro Wrestling Freedoms (2018–present) ===
Masaoka made his debut in Pro Wrestling Freedoms at Takashi Sasaki Produce Show ~ Pro-Wrestling Sengoku-Jidai 3 on August 6, 2018, where he teamed up with Daisuke Masaoka to defeat Aizawa NO. 1 and Yuya Susumu in tag team competition. During his time with the promotion, he chased for various accomplishments. He competed in the inaugural tournament of the King of Freedom World Junior Heavyweight Championship, where he defeated Brahman Kei in the first rounds, Dragon Libre in the second, but fell short to Kamui in the finals. He eventually defeated Kamui at We Love Freedoms! We Are Freedoms! on May 3, 2023, to win the championship.

=== Pro Wrestling Noah (2025–present) ===
Masaoka competed in several of Pro Wrestling Noah's signature events. In the Global Junior Heavyweight Tag League, he made his first appearance at the 2025 edition where he teamed up with Gaia Hox, placing themselves in the B Block where they scored a total of three points after competing against the teams of Amakusa and Junta Miyawaki, Tadasuke and Yuto Kikuchi, and Atsushi Kotoge and Hajime Ohara. In the Jr. Grand Prix, Masaoka made his first appearance at the 2025 edition where he fell short to Amakusa in the first rounds.

Masaoka made his debut in a Noah pay-per-view on the first night of the 2025 Star Navgation series of events where he teamed up with "F-Swag" stablemate to unsuccessfully challenge Amakusa and Junta Miyawaki for the GHC Junior Heavyweight Tag Team Championship. At Noah Memorial Voyage in Yokohama on March 2, 2025, he teamed up with Gaia Hox, Atsushi Kotoge and Hajime Ohara in a losing effort against All Rebellion (Alejandro and Kai Fujimura), Eita and Daiki Odashima.

==== Team 2000X (2025–present) ====
On the second night of the Jr. Grand Prix from November 16, 2025, Masaoka turned on Amakusa who was one of his allies, costing the latter his quarterfinal performance, helping Tadasuke get the win an siding with him, thus joining Team 2000X in the process.

== Championships and accomplishments ==
- Pro Wrestling Freedoms
  - King of Freedom World Junior Heavyweight Championship (1 time)
  - Barefoot King Championship (1 time)
- Pro Wrestling Noah
  - GHC Junior Heavyweight Tag Team Championship (1 time, current) – with Yo-Hey
- Pro-Wrestling Shi-En
  - Pro-Wrestling Shi-En Championship (1 time)
  - Pro-Wrestling Shi-En Tag Team Championship (3 times) – with Toru Matsunaga (1), Hiroto Okubo (1) and Donguri Fujie (1)
  - One Chance Tournament (2017)
- Total Triumph Team
  - GWC 6-Man Tag Team Championship (1 time, final) – with Kohei Kinoshita and Mataro Aoki
  - TTT Indie Unified Tag Team Championship (1 time) – with Kohei Kinoshita
  - TTT Indie Unified Six Man Tag Team Championship (1 time) – with Kohei Kinoshita and Gaia Hox
