= Shin-Kiba 1st Ring =

Arena in Tokyo, Japan

Shinkiba 1st RING
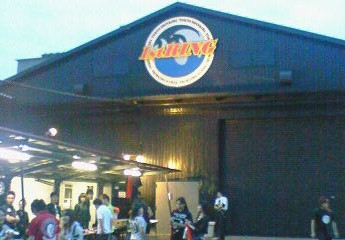
- Interactive map of Shinkiba 1st RING
- Location: Shinkiba 1-6-24, Koto Tokyo, Japan
- Coordinates: 35°38′43″N 139°49′42″E
- Operator: West Corporation Inc.
- Capacity: 290

Construction
- Opened: March 2004

Shin-Kiba 1st Ring is an arena in Tokyo, which holds 290 people. It was opened in 2001, its first event being a JDStar "Grapple Beauty" show, even though the inside of the building was not even close to being completed. It has quickly become a favorite of smaller promotions, for its cheap rental prices and the close proximity that it has to Shin-Kiba Station, and the train lines.

Japanese all women's professional wrestling promotion World Wonder Ring Stardom holds a lot of their events at the venue.
