= Osaka Hurricane =

- Created by: Super Delfin
- Promotions: Osaka Pro Wrestling
- First event: 2003
- Last event: 2012
- Event gimmick: OPW's flagship event

Osaka Hurricane was the annual flagship professional wrestling event produced by Osaka Pro Wrestling between 2003 and 2012. The event was held during the month of February. The event was considered the biggest event of Osaka Pro. It was introduced first in 2003. Two editions of the event were held in 2004. The first edition of 2004 was the fourth Super J-Cup tournament held in Osaka while the second edition of 2004 was held in Tokyo during the month of April and was the only version of the event to be held in April and outside Osaka. The final event was held in July 2012 and then Osaka Hurricane was discontinued.

== Dates and venues ==
Event	Date	City	Venue	Attendance	Main event	Ref
Osaka Hurricane (2003)	February 1, 2003	Osaka, Japan	Osaka-jō Hall	7,868	Super Delfin (c) vs. Big Boss MA-G-MA for the Osaka Pro Wrestling Championship	
Osaka Hurricane (2004): Super J-Cup 4th Stage	February 21, 2004	Osaka, Japan	Osaka-jō Hall	6,800	Naomichi Marufuji vs. Takehiro Murahama in the Super J-Cup tournament final	
Osaka Hurricane in Tokyo	April 2, 2004	Tokyo, Japan	Yoyogi National Gymnasium	2,000	Jushin Thunder Liger, Koji Kanemoto and Wataru Inoue vs. Big Boss MA-G-MA, Daio QUALLT and Goa	
Osaka Hurricane (2005)	February 13, 2005	Osaka, Japan	Osaka Prefectural Gymnasium	4,096	Big Boss MA-G-MA (c) vs. Super Dolphin for the Osaka Pro Wrestling Championship	
Osaka Hurricane (2006) "Starting Point Revolution"	February 26, 2006	Kadoma, Osaka, Japan	Namiyaha Dome Sub-Arena	1,882	Super Dolphin (c) vs. Super Delfin for the Osaka Pro Wrestling Championship	
Osaka Hurricane (2007)	February 12, 2007	Osaka, Japan	Grand Cube Osaka	2,862	Billy Ken Kid (c) vs. Tigers Mask for the Osaka Pro Wrestling Championship	
Osaka Hurricane (2008)	February 11, 2008	Osaka, Japan	Osaka Prefectural Gymnasium	6,816	Tigers Mask (c) vs. Black Buffalo in a mask vs. mask match for the Osaka Pro Wrestling Championship	
Osaka Hurricane (2009)	February 15, 2009	Osaka, Japan	Osaka Prefectural Gymnasium	5,082	Hideyoshi (c) vs. Billy Ken Kid for the Osaka Pro Wrestling Championship	
Osaka Hurricane (2010) "Pink Ribbon Charity"	February 11, 2010	Osaka, Japan	Osaka Prefectural Gymnasium	5,083	Dick Togo (c) vs. Billy Ken Kid in a No Disqualification match for the Osaka Pro Wrestling Championship	
Osaka Hurricane (2011)	August 14, 2011	Osaka, Japan	Osaka Prefectural Gymnasium	4,583	Tigers Mask (c) vs. Billy Ken Kid for the Osaka Pro Wrestling Championship	
Osaka Hurricane (2012)	July 22, 2012	Osaka, Japan	Osaka Prefectural Gymnasium	4,516	Black Buffalo (c) vs. Daisuke Harada for the Osaka Pro Wrestling Championship	

== Results ==
=== 2003 ===
Osaka Hurricane (2003)
- Promotion: Osaka Pro Wrestling
- Date: February 1, 2003 (taped); February 15, 2003 (aired)
- City: Chūō-ku, Osaka
- Venue: Osaka-jō Hall
- Attendance: 7,868

Osaka Hurricane chronology
← Previous; First	Next → Osaka Hurricane (2004): Super J-Cup

The first Osaka Hurricane event took place on February 1, 2003, at the Osaka-jō Hall. The event was headlined by an Osaka Pro Wrestling Championship match billed as "Symbol of Osaka vs. Tennozan" in which Delfin defeated the defending champion Big Boss MA-G-MA to capture the title.

No.	Results	Stipulations	Times
1	Azteca defeated Black Tigers	Singles match	7:42
2	Monster King Mandora and Policewoman defeated Night Master and Tortuga	Tag team match	11:05
3	Kintaro Kanemura defeated Daio Quallt	Singles match	11:51
4	Billy Ken Kid, Miracle Man and Tigers Mask defeated Kengo Takai, Super Demekin and Yutaka Fukuda	Six-man tag team match	12:49
5	Ebessan defeated Kuishinbo Kamen (c) (2:1)	Character Deprivation Two out of three falls match for the Osaka Meibutsu Sekaiichi Championship	11:05
6	Taka Michinoku defeated Gamma	Singles match	14:26
7	Jushin Thunder Liger and Takehiro Murahama defeated Infinity (Black Buffalo and Tsubasa) (c)	Tag team match for the Osaka Pro Wrestling Tag Team Championship	17:01
8	Super Delfin (c) defeated Big Boss MA-G-MA	Singles match for the Osaka Pro Wrestling Championship	14:13
(c) / – the champion(s) heading into the match

=== 2004 ===
==== Super J-Cup ====
The second Osaka Hurricane was held on February 21, 2004, featured the 2004 Super J-Cup tournament, featuring the best junior heavyweights in Japan and the event was aired on pay-per-view. The tournament was won by Naomichi Marufuji from Pro Wrestling Noah. The event also featured a six-man tag team match, in which Cima, Heat and Kenta defeated the veteran team of Jushin Thunder Liger, Jinsei Shinzaki and Super Delfin.

No.	Results	Stipulations	Times
1	Naomichi Marufuji defeated Jun Kasai	2004 Super J-Cup tournament quarter-final	8:16
2	Garuda defeated Goa	2004 Super J-Cup tournament quarter-final	7:01
3	Wataru Inoue defeated Kazuya Yuasa via submission	2004 Super J-Cup tournament quarter-final	9:25
4	Takehiro Murahama defeated Taichi Ishikari	2004 Super J-Cup tournament quarter-final	5:03
5	Ofune defeated Apple Miyuki	Singles match	6:52
6	Men's Teioh, MIKAMI and Tomohiro Ishii defeated Azteca, Kintaro Kanemura and MA-G-MA	Six-man tag team match	10:35
7	Kuishinbo Kamen defeated Ebessan (c)	Singles match for the Osaka Meibutsu Sekaiichi Championship	8:04
8	Naomichi Marufuji defeated Garuda	2004 Super J-Cup tournament semi-final	10:22
9	Takehiro Murahama defeated Wataru Inoue	2004 Super J-Cup tournament semi-final	9:30
10	Billyken Kid and Tigers Mask (c) defeated Shiryu and Taka Michinoku	Tag team match for the Osaka Pro Wrestling Tag Team Championship	12:55
11	Cima, Heat and Kenta defeated Jinsei Shinzaki, Jushin Thunder Liger and Super Delfin	Six-man tag team match	16:53
12	Naomichi Marufuji defeated Takehiro Murahama	2004 Super J-Cup tournament final	14:05
(c) / – the champion(s) heading into the match

Tournament brackets

Round 1
Naomichi Marufuji	Pin
Jun Kasai
Garuda	Pin
Goa
Wataru Inoue	Sub
Kazuya Yuasa
Takehiro Murahama	Pin
Taichi Ishikari

Semifinals
Naomichi Marufuji	Pin
Garuda
Wataru Inoue
Takehiro Murahama	Pin

Final
Naomichi Marufuji	Pin
Takehiro Murahama

==== Osaka Hurricane in Tokyo ====
Osaka Hurricane in Tokyo
- Promotion: Osaka Pro Wrestling
- Date: April 2, 2004 (taped); May 2, 2004 (aired)
- City: Shibuya, Tokyo
- Venue: Yoyogi National Gymnasium
- Attendance: 2,000

Osaka Hurricane chronology
← Previous; Osaka Hurricane (2004): Super J-Cup	Next → Osaka Hurricane (2005)

The third Osaka Hurricane event was held at Yoyogi National Gymnasium in Tokyo and was the first and only Osaka Hurricane event to be held in Tokyo and was dubbed Osaka Hurricane in Tokyo. The event took place on April 2, 2004, and marked the only time that Osaka Hurricane was held twice in a year. The event was headlined by a six-man tag team match in which Big Boss MA-G-MA, Daio QUALLT and GOA billed as Kishiwada Gurentai took on the team of New Japan Pro-Wrestling representatives Jushin Thunder Liger, Koji Kanemoto and Wataru Inoue. Kaz Hayashi defended the AJPW World Junior Heavyweight Championship against Tsubasa in the penultimate match.

No.	Results	Stipulations	Times
1	Gamma defeated Masato Motoba	Singles match	5:17
2	Black Buffalo defeated Onryo	Singles match	12:55
3	Billy Ken Kid and Tigers Mask defeated Perro and Yutaka	Tag team match	10:45
4	Ai Fujita, Kuishinbo Kamen and Super Delfin defeated Ebessan, Miracle Man and Policewoman	Six-man tag team match	18:54
5	Heat vs. Takehiro Murahama ended in a time limit draw	Singles match	30:00
6	Kaz Hayashi (c) defeated Tsubasa	Singles match for the World Junior Heavyweight Championship	13:47
7	Team New Japan (Jushin Thunder Liger, Koji Kanemoto and Wataru Inoue) defeated Kishiwada Gurentai (Big Boss MA-G-MA, Daio QUALLT and Goa)	Six-man tag team match	19:25
(c) / – the champion(s) heading into the match

=== 2005 ===
Osaka Hurricane (2005)
- Promotion: Osaka Pro Wrestling
- Date: February 13, 2005
- City: Naniwa-ku, Osaka
- Venue: Osaka Prefectural Gymnasium
- Attendance: 4,096

Osaka Hurricane chronology
← Previous; Osaka Hurricane in Tokyo	Next → Osaka Hurricane (2006)

The fourth Osaka Hurricane was held on February 13, 2005, at the Osaka Prefectural Gymnasium in Osaka, Japan. The event was aired live on pay-per-view via "Perfect Choice" pay-per-view service. In the main event, Big Boss MA-G-MA defended the Osaka Pro Wrestling Championship against Super Dolphin, who defeated MA-G-MA to win the title. The event also featured the return of Tsubasa to action as he teamed with Jushin Thunder Liger to take on Super Delfin and The Tiger in a tag team match, which Liger and Tsubasa won.

No.	Results	Stipulations	Times
1	Yutaka defeated La Uchida	Singles match	6:51
2	Takaku Fuke and Viewtiful Joe defeated Azteca and Densen Man	Tag team match	10:36
3	Tigers Mask defeated Histeria and Kendo Kobayashi	Two out of three falls Handicap match	8:59
4	Kabuto Beetle defeated El Oriental (c)	Singles match for the MWF World Junior Heavyweight Championship	17:18
5	Kuishinbo Kamen (c) defeated Ebessan	Singles match for the Osaka Meibutsu Sekaiichi Championship	11:23
6	Jushin Thunder Liger and Takehiro Murahama defeated Super Delfin and The Tiger	Tag team match	14:32
7	Billy Ken Kid and Perro defeated Black Buffalo and Daio QUALLT (c)	Tag team match for the Osaka Pro Wrestling Tag Team Championship	17:24
8	Super Dolphin defeated Big Boss MA-G-MA (c)	Singles match for the Osaka Pro Wrestling Championship	16:47
(c) / – the champion(s) heading into the match

=== 2006 ===
Osaka Hurricane (2006)
- Promotion: Osaka Pro Wrestling
- Date: February 26, 2006 (taped); March 19, 2006 (aired)
- City: Kadoma, Osaka
- Venue: Namiyaha Dome Sub-Arena
- Attendance: 1,882
- Tagline: Starting Point Revolution

Osaka Hurricane chronology
← Previous; Osaka Hurricane (2005)	Next → Osaka Hurricane (2007)

The fifth Osaka Hurricane was held on February 26, 2006, at Namiyaha Dome Sub-Arena in Kadoma, Osaka, Japan. The main event featured a match between teacher and student in which Super Dolphin defended the Osaka Pro Wrestling Championship against his trainer and mentor Super Delfin, who defeated Dolphin to capture the title.

No.	Results	Stipulations	Times
1	La Uchida defeated Atsushi Kotoge	Singles match	9:11
2	Miracle Man defeated Monster King Mandora	Singles match	5:55
3	Hisakatsu Oya and Takaku Fuke defeated Sengoku (Hideyoshi and Masamune)	Tag team match	12:02
4	Mr. Okita defeated Policeman (c), Azteca, Ebessan, Ice Penguin, Kuishinbo Kamen, Monkey Magic III and Takoyakida	Eight-way elimination match for the Osaka Meibutsu Sekaiichi Championship	9:15
5	Billy Ken Kid and Black Buffalo defeated Flash Moon and Tigers Mask	Tag team match for the Osaka Pro Wrestling Tag Team Championship	23:07
6	Super Delfin defeated Super Dolphin (c)	Singles match for the Osaka Pro Wrestling Championship	26:11
(c) / – the champion(s) heading into the match

=== 2007 ===
Osaka Hurricane (2007)
- Promotion: Osaka Pro Wrestling
- Date: February 12, 2007 (taped); March 4, 2007 (aired)
- City: Osaka, Osaka
- Venue: Grand Cube Osaka
- Attendance: 2,862

Osaka Hurricane chronology
← Previous; Osaka Hurricane (2006)	Next → Osaka Hurricane (2008)

The sixth Osaka Hurricane event was held on February 12, 2007, at the Grand Cube Osaka in Osaka, Japan. In the main event, Billy Ken Kid defended the Osaka Pro Wrestling Championship against Tigers Mask, with Mask beating Kid for the title. The event also featured a special dream tag team match featuring four of the biggest junior heavyweights of Japan, pitting Super Delfin and The Great Sasuke against Gran Hamada and Último Dragón.

No.	Results	Stipulations	Times
1	Daisuke Harada defeated Robert Tanaka	Singles match	7:50
2	Condor and Kazushi defeated Atsushi Kotoge and La Uchida	Tag team match	11:58
3	Super Dolphin defeated Asian Cougar	Singles match	14:11
4	Gunsou Suuchi defeated Dingo, Don Arakawa, Ebessan, Ice Penguin, Kuishinbo Kamen, Miracle Man, Peckey, Takaku Fuke and YUKA	10-man Battle Royal for the vacant Osaka Meibutsu Sekaiichi Championship	11:34
5	Sengoku (Hideyoshi and Masamune) defeated GAINA and Zeus (c) and Flash Moon and Tsubasa	Three-way elimination match for the Osaka Pro Wrestling Tag Team Championship	13:59
6	Super Delfin and The Great Sasuke defeated Gran Hamada and Último Dragón	Tag team match	17:56
7	Tigers Mask defeated Billy Ken Kid (c)	Singles match for the Osaka Pro Wrestling Championship	36:55
(c) / – the champion(s) heading into the match

=== 2008 ===
Osaka Hurricane (2008)
- Promotion: Osaka Pro Wrestling
- Date: February 11, 2008 (taped); March 1, 2008 (aired)
- City: Naniwa-ku, Osaka
- Venue: Osaka Prefectural Gymnasium
- Attendance: 6,816

Osaka Hurricane chronology
← Previous; Osaka Hurricane (2007)	Next → Osaka Hurricane (2009)

The seventh Osaka Hurricane was held on February 11, 2008, at the Osaka Prefectural Gymnasium in Osaka, Japan. The main event was a mask vs. mask match, in which Black Buffalo defended the Osaka Pro Wrestling Championship against Tigers Mask. Billy Ken Kid made his return to action at the event by competing against Naomichi Marufuji.

No.	Results	Stipulations	Times
1	Daisuke Harada and Takoyakida defeated Robert Tanaka and Tadasuke	Tag team match	8:55
2	Atsushi Kotoge, Flying Kid Ichihara, Takaku Fuke and Último Dragón defeated Kamui, Condor and Sengoku (Hideyoshi and Masamune)	Eight-man tag team match	11:57
3	Zeus defeated Jinsei Shinzaki	Singles match	15:08
4	Akebono, Kuishinbo Kamen and Super Delfin defeated Ebessan, Kanjyuro Matsuyama and Miracle Man	Six-man tag team match	10:40
5	Naomichi Marufuji defeated Billy Ken Kid	Singles match	13:15
6	GAINA and Zero (c) defeated Asian Cougar and Tsubasa	Tag team match for the Osaka Pro Wrestling Tag Team Championship	19:59
7	Tigers Mask (c) defeated Black Buffalo	Mask vs. mask match for the Osaka Pro Wrestling Championship	20:38
(c) / – the champion(s) heading into the match

=== 2009 ===
Osaka Hurricane (2009)
- Promotion: Osaka Pro Wrestling
- Date: February 15, 2009 (taped); March 11, 2009 (aired)
- City: Naniwa-ku, Osaka
- Venue: Osaka Prefectural Gymnasium
- Attendance: 5,082

Osaka Hurricane chronology
← Previous; Osaka Hurricane (2008)	Next → Osaka Hurricane (2010)

The eighth Osaka Hurricane was held on February 15, 2009, at the Osaka Prefectural Gymnasium in Osaka, Japan. The main event pitted Hideyoshi defending the Osaka Pro Wrestling Championship against Billy Ken Kid. Kid won the title. The Bodyguard competed in his first professional wrestling match at the event, making his in-ring debut against Zeus. The two would go on to form a tag team in future called The Big Guns, winning the Osaka Pro Wrestling Tag Team Championship multiple times and also achieving success in All Japan Pro Wrestling. The event featured comic tag team matches featuring wrestlers mimicking Antonio Inoki, Tatsumi Fujinami and Riki Choshu.

No.	Results	Stipulations	Times
1	Kazuaki Mihara defeated Naoki Setoguchi	Singles match	7:11
2	Tsubasa and Último Dragón defeated Masamune and Orochi	Tag team match	9:17
3	Dump Matsumoto, Ebessan, Kuishinbo Kamen and Kyusei Ninja Ranmaru defeated Kanjyuro Matsuyama, Miracle Man, Stalker Ichikawa and Takaku Fuke	Eight-man tag team match	12:13
4	Atsushi Kotoge, Daisuke Harada and Tadasuke defeated Kazma, Makoto Oishi and Shiori Asahi	Six-man tag team match	10:57
5	Honey Shinya and Small Antonio Inoki defeated Love Sexy Otowaya and Love Sexy Rose	Tag team match	6:58
6	Riki Kansyu and Tatsumi Ebenami defeated Honey Shinya and Small Antonio Inoki	Tag team match	3:43
7	Zeus defeated The Bodyguard	Singles match	8:03
8	Asian Cougar and The Great Sasuke defeated Black Buffalo and Tigers Mask (c)	Tag team match for the Osaka Pro Wrestling Tag Team Championship	16:51
9	Billy Ken Kid defeated Hideyoshi (c)	Singles match for the Osaka Pro Wrestling Championship	27:50
(c) / – the champion(s) heading into the match

=== 2010 ===
Osaka Hurricane (2010)
- Promotion: Osaka Pro Wrestling
- Date: February 11, 2010
- City: Naniwa-ku, Osaka
- Venue: Osaka Prefectural Gymnasium
- Attendance: 5,083
- Tagline: Pink Ribbon Charity

Osaka Hurricane chronology
← Previous; Osaka Hurricane (2008)	Next → Osaka Hurricane (2010)

The ninth Osaka Hurricane event was held on February 11, 2010, at the Osaka Prefectural Gymnasium in Osaka, Japan. In the main event, Billy Ken Kid defeated the defending champion Dick Togo in a No Disqualification match for the Osaka Pro Wrestling Championship.

No.	Results	Stipulations	Times
1	Kazuaki Mihara and Shigehiro Irie defeated Perro and Takoyakida	Tag team match	9:31
2	GAMI and Yumi Ohka defeated Apple Miyuki and Kana	Tag team match	10:43
3	Kikutaro, Kyusei Ninja Ranmaru and Shiro Koshinaka defeated Ebessan, Kanjyuro Matsuyama and Kuishinbo Kamen	Six-man tag team match	13:05
4	Black Buffalo and Tigers Mask defeated Gamma and Super Shisa by disqualification	Tag team match	12:47
5	Abdullah the Butcher, Asian Cougar, Miracle Man and Takaku Fuke defeated Fujita, Orochi, Tadasuke and The Bodyguard	Eight-man tag team match	8:42
6	Momo no Seishun Tag (Atsushi Kotoge and Daisuke Harada) defeated Sengoku (Hideyoshi and Masamune) (c)	Tag team match for the Osaka Pro Wrestling Tag Team Championship	20:53
7	Billy Ken Kid defeated Dick Togo (c)	No Disqualification match for the Osaka Pro Wrestling Championship	33:33
(c) / – the champion(s) heading into the match

=== 2011 ===
Osaka Hurricane (2011)
- Promotion: Osaka Pro Wrestling
- Date: August 14, 2011 (taped); September 3, 2011 (aired)
- City: Naniwa-ku, Osaka
- Venue: Osaka Prefectural Gymnasium
- Attendance: 4,583

Osaka Hurricane chronology
← Previous; Osaka Hurricane (2010)	Next → Osaka Hurricane (2012)

The tenth Osaka Hurricane event was held on August 14, 2011, at the Osaka Prefectural Gymnasium in Osaka, Japan. In the main event, Billy Ken Kid defeated Tigers Mask to capture the Osaka Pro Wrestling Championship.

No.	Results	Stipulations	Times
1	Kazuaki Mihara and Naoki Setoguchi defeated Shigehiro Irie and Yusuke Kodama	Tag team match	6:28
2	Apple Miyuki, Takoyakida and Ultimate Spider Jr. defeated Honey Jiro, Kikutaro and Kyusei Ninja Ranmaru	Six-person tag team match	9:50
3	Black Buffalo, Kana, Tsubasa and Yutaka defeated Hayata, Hideyoshi, Masamune and Mio Shirai	Eight-person mixed tag team match	9:38
4	Kanjyuro Matsuyama and Miracle Man defeated Ebessan and Kuishinbo Kamen	Tag team match	9:40
5	Masahiro Chono, Tajiri and Zeus defeated Kuuga, Orochi and Tadasuke	Six-man tag team match	14:19
6	Momo no Seishun Tag (Atsushi Kotoge and Daisuke Harada) (c) defeated Ricky Marvin and Taiji Ishimori	Tag team match for the Osaka Pro Wrestling Tag Team Championship	22:45
7	Billy Ken Kid defeated Tigers Mask (c)	Singles match for the Osaka Pro Wrestling Championship	38:20
(c) / – the champion(s) heading into the match

=== 2012 ===
Osaka Hurricane (2012)
- Promotion: Osaka Pro Wrestling
- Date: July 22, 2012
- City: Naniwa-ku, Osaka
- Venue: Osaka Prefectural Gymnasium
- Attendance: 4,516

Osaka Hurricane chronology
← Previous; Osaka Hurricane (2011)	Next → Last

The eleventh and final Osaka Hurricane was held on July 22, 2012, at the Osaka Prefectural Gymnasium in Osaka, Japan. The main event was a singles match for the Osaka Pro Wrestling Championship, in which Daisuke Harada defeated the defending champion Black Buffalo to capture the title.

No.	Results	Stipulations	Times
1	Shoichi Uchida and Yutaka defeated Kazuaki Mihara and Naoki Setoguchi	Tag team match	8:31
2	Kana and Sawako Shimono defeated Apple Miyuki and Syuri	Tag team match	8:50
3	Kaijin Habu Otoko and Shisao defeated Billy Ken Kid and Tsubasa	Tag team match	12:02
4	Hayata and Tadasuke defeated The Big Guns (The Bodyguard and Zeus) and Sengoku (Hideyoshi and Masamune)	Three-way match for the vacant Osaka Pro Wrestling Tag Team Championship	13:02
5	Ebessan, The Great Kabuki, Kuishinbo Kamen and Kyusei Ninja Ranmaru defeated Kanjyuro Matsuyama, Kikutaro, Miracle Man and Takoyakida	Eight-man tag team match	13:24
6	First Tiger Mask, Tiger Shark and Tigers Mask defeated JOKER (Kuuga, Orochi and Spider J)	Six-man tag team match	12:13
7	Daisuke Harada defeated Black Buffalo (c)	Singles match for the Osaka Pro Wrestling Championship	29:52
(c) / – the champion(s) heading into the match
