= Tsubasa (wrestler) =

Japanese professional wrestler

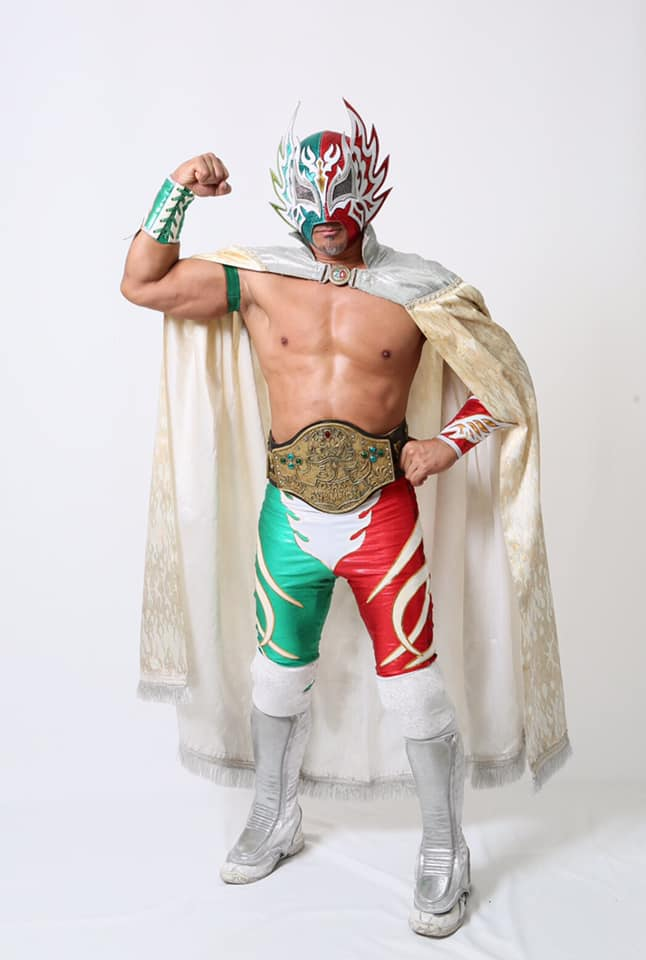
- Tsubasa in 2019

Personal information
- Born: June 21, 1973 (age 53) Kasahara, Japan

Professional wrestling career
- Ring name: Tsubasa
- Billed height: 170 cm (5 ft 7 in)
- Billed weight: 80 kg (176 lb)
- Trained by: Fray Tormenta
- Debut: 1996

Tsubasa (ツバサ, Tsubasa) (sometimes stylized in capital letters as TSUBASA) is a Japanese professional wrestler currently working as a freelancer on the Japanese independent circuit and is best known for his tenure with the Japanese promotion Osaka Pro Wrestling where he is a former Osaka Openweight Champion. A masked wrestler, Tsubasa is greatly influenced by lucha libre, and because of this, he has followed Mexican tradition for masked wrestlers, so his real name is not a matter of public record.

== Professional wrestling career ==
=== North American independent circuit (1996–1999) ===
Tsubasa made an appearance at WCW Monday NITRO #97 of World Championship Wrestling on July 22, 1997, show where he fell short to Konnan.

==== Consejo Mundial de Lucha Libre (1996–1999) ====
Tsubasa made his professional wrestling debut at CMLL Martes De Coliseo, an event promoted by Consejo Mundial de Lucha Libre on June 25, 1996, where he teamed up with Atlantico and Kung Fu to defeat Damian El Guerrero, Yone Genjin and Zumbido in a 2-out-of-3 falls six man tag team match.

Tsubasa participated in the CMLL International Gran Prix branch of events. He made his first appearance at the 1997 Grand Prix where he fell short to Último Dragón in a first-round match.

=== Japanese independent circuit (1996–present) ===
As a freelancer, Tsubasa is known for competing in various promotions from the Japanese independence scene. At a house show promoted by Wrestle Association-R on September 7, 1999, he unsuccessfully challenged Masaaki Mochizuki for the WAR International Junior Heavyweight Championship. Tsubasa had a brief encounter in New Japan Pro Wrestling and at NJPW The 2nd Judgement!! on December 14, 2000, he wrestled alongside Super Delfin and Takehiro Murahama in a losing effort to Jushin Thunder Liger, Minoru Tanaka and Togi Makabe. At DDT Vol. 6 ~ Yukinori Matsui 25th Anniversary from May 16, 2019, Tsubasa teamed up with Jinsei Shinzaki and Yukio Sakaguchi to defeat Damnation (Mad Paulie, Soma Takao and Tetsuya Endo) in a six-man tag team match. At AJPW Zeus Festival 2019, an event promoted by All Japan Pro Wrestling on October 20, he teamed up with Billy Ken Kid to defeat Tajiri and Ultimate Spider Jr. At STRONGHEARTS Action 6 In Oska, an event promoted by Oriental Wrestling Entertainment on December 19, 2020, he teamed up with Gaina and HUB to defeat StrongHearts (El Lindaman, Issei Onitsuka and T-Hawk).

==== Dragon Gate (2013) ====
Tsubasa briefly stepped in the Dragon Gate promotion, making an appearance at the 2013 Gate of Destiny from November 3 where he teamed up with Ciba and We Are Team Veteran (Cima and Masaaki Mochizuki) to defeat Millennials (Flamita, Rocky Lobo, U-T and Yosuke Santa Maria) in an Eight-man tag team match. On the fourteenth night of the Summer Adventure Tag League 2013 from September 29, he fell short to Genki Horiguchi in the semi-finals of an Open the Brave Gate Championship tournament after defeating Super Shisa one night before to qualify further.

==== Osaka Pro Wrestling (1999–present) ====
Tsubasa wrestled in the very first show of the promotion, the Osaka Pro Debut Spicy Series on May 1, 1999, where he competed in a 13-man battle royal also involving Kuishinbo Kamen, Super Delfin, Virus, Violencia and others. He is a former Osaka Openweight Championship, title which he won at Osaka Pro-Wrestling Came Over! in Suminoe on February 16, 2019, by defeating Kushikatsu Oyaji.

He is known for working in the Osaka Hurricane branch of events. He made his first appearance at the Osaka Hurricane in Tokyo edition on April 2, 2004, where he unsuccessfully challenged Kaz Hayashi for the World Junior Heavyweight Championship. At the 2011 edition of the event from August 14, he teamed up with Black Buffalo, Kana and Yutaka to defeat Hayata, Hideyoshi, Masamune and Mio Shirai in an Eight-person mixed tag team match. He marked his last appearance at the 2012 edition of the event from July 22 where he teamed up with Billy Ken Kid falling short to Kaijin Habu Otoko and Shisao in a tag team match.

== Championships and accomplishments ==
- Consejo Mundial de Lucha Libre
  - CMLL Japan Tag Team Championship (1 time) – with El Oriental
- DDT Pro Wrestling
  - Ironman Heavymetalweight Championship (1 time)
- Dove Pro Wrestling
  - Dove Pro Tag Team Championship (1 time) – with Black Buffalo
  - Dove Pro Tag Team Title Tournament (2014-2015) – with Black Buffalo
- Kyushu Pro-Wrestling
  - Kyushu Pro Tag Team Championship (1 time) – with Billyken Kid
- Osaka Pro Wrestling
  - Osaka Openweight Championship (1 time)
  - Osaka Tag Team Championship (6 times) – with Black Buffalo (3), Asian Cougar (1) and Billyken Kid (2)
  - Osaka Tag Festival (2003, 2004) – with Billyken Kid and Yutaka
  - Tennōzan (2018)
- Pro-Wrestling Basara
  - UWA World Trios Championship (1 time) – with Billyken Kid and Masamune
- Pro Wrestling Illustrated
  - Ranked No. 206 of the top 100 male singles wrestlers in the PWI 100 in 2002
