= Super J-Cup (2004) =

2004 Osaka Pro Wrestling event

Super J-Cup: 4th Stage
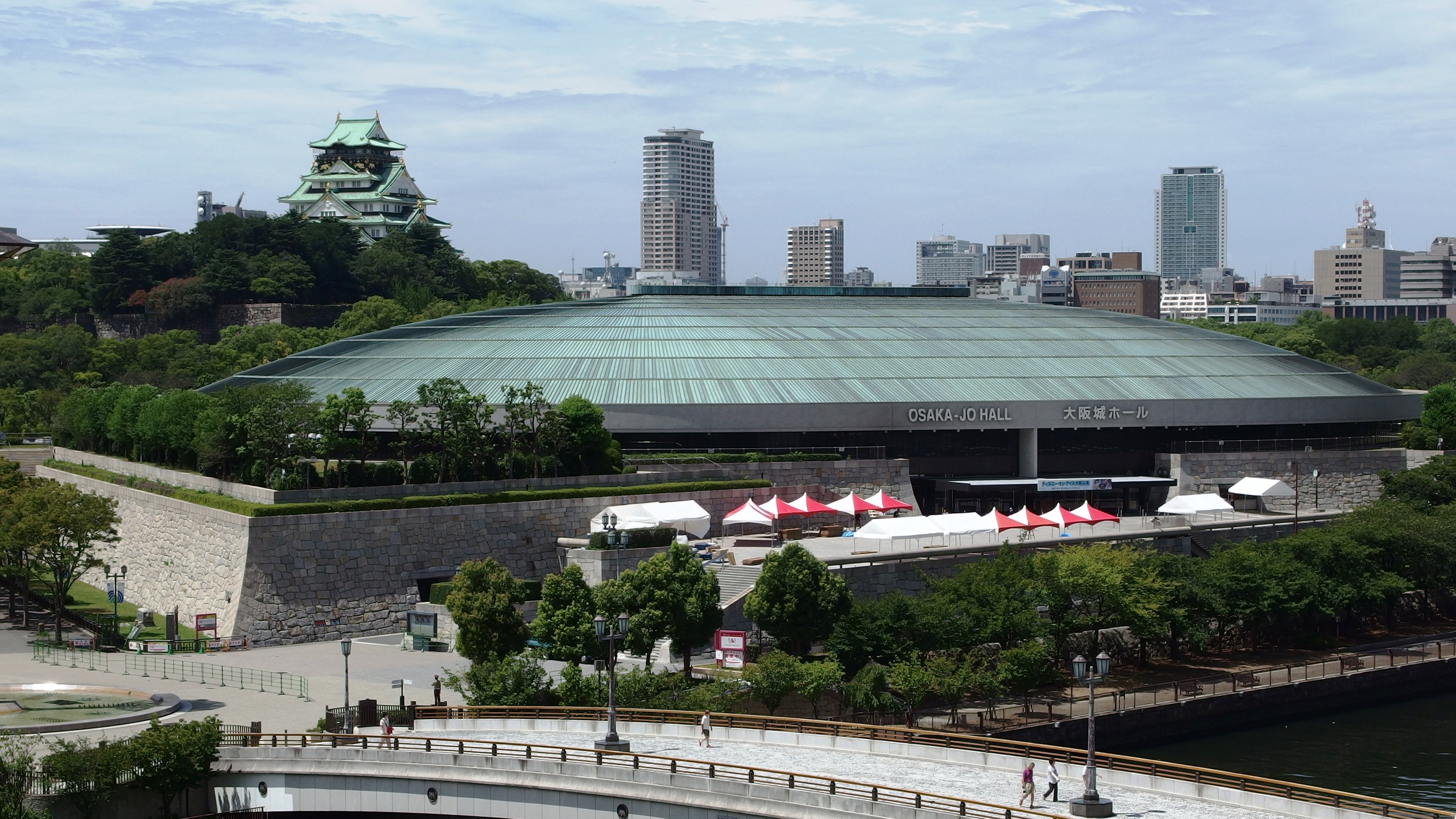
- Osaka-jō Hall
- Promotion: Osaka Pro Wrestling
- Date: February 21, 2004
- City: Osaka, Japan
- Venue: Osaka-jō Hall
- Attendance: 6,800

Osaka Hurricane chronology
← Previous; Osaka Hurricane (2003)	Next → Osaka Hurricane in Tokyo

Super J-Cup chronology
← Previous; Super J-Cup: 3rd Stage	Next → Super J-Cup: 5th Stage

Super J-Cup: 4th Stage: Osaka Hurricane 2004 was the second Osaka Hurricane and the fourth Super J-Cup professional wrestling pay-per-view event, it was produced by Osaka Pro Wrestling on February 21, 2004, at Osaka-jō Hall in Osaka, Japan. The event was broadcast live on pay-per-view via SKY PerfecTV! direct broadcast satellite service. It was the fourth edition of the famous interpromotional junior heavyweight tournament Super J-Cup, featuring the best junior heavyweight wrestlers from Japan and marked the tenth anniversary of the inaugural Super J-Cup event held in 1994. It was a three-round single elimination tournament featuring eight wrestlers, marking the fewest participants in a Super J-Cup tournament ever.

The event featured twelve professional wrestling matches. The main focus was the namesake Super J-Cup tournament as OPW's own Takehiro Murakama faced Pro Wrestling Noah's Naomichi Marufuji in the final round of the 2004 Super J-Cup, which Marufuji won. On the undercard, Kuishinbo Kamen defeated defending champion Ebessan to capture the promotion's Meibutsu Sekaiichi Championship and the team of Billyken Kid and Tigers Mask successfully defended the Tag Team Championship against Taka Michinoku and Shiryu. The event also featured the Super J-Cup creator and two-time winner Jushin Thunder Liger, OPW's owner Super Delfin, Pro Wrestling Noah's Kenta and Jinsei Shinzaki in highly acclaimed non-tournament matches.

== Participants ==
Name:	Promotion:	Championship held:
Garuda	Wrestling Marvelous Future	–
Goa	Osaka Pro Wrestling	–
Jun Kasai	Pro Wrestling Zero-One	–
Kazuya Yuasa	Michinoku Pro Wrestling	–
Naomichi Marufuji	Pro Wrestling Noah	GHC Junior Heavyweight Tag Team Champion
Taichi Ishikari	All Japan Pro Wrestling	–
Takehiro Murakama	Osaka Pro Wrestling	–
Wataru Inoue	New Japan Pro-Wrestling	–

== Event ==
=== Quarterfinals ===
The 2004 Super J-Cup tournament kicked off with Naomichi Marufuji taking on Jun Kasai in the first match of the tournament. After a back and forth action, Marufuji executed a Shiranui on Kasai to win the match. In the next match, Garuda defeated Goa by performing a Hurricanrana to advance to the semi-final. The third match of the quarter-final saw Wataru Inoue defeating Kazuya Yuasa by forcing him to submit to an octopus hold. In the last match of the quarter-final round, OPW's own wrestler Takehiro Murakama took on Taichi Ishikari. After a back and forth action, Murakama executed a Brainbuster for the victory.

The quarter-final was followed by non-tournament matches. The first was a joshi match, in which Ofune defeated Apple Miyuki by making her submit to a front headlock. The next match was a six-man tag team match, in which the team of Men's Teioh, MIKAMI and Tomohiro Ishii took on Azteca, Kintaro Kanemura and MA-G-MA. Ishii hit a vertical drop brainbuster to Azteca for the victory.

Ebessan defended the Meibutsu Sekaiichi Championship against Kuishinbo Kamen. After a back and forth action between the two competitors, Kamen delivered a Cancun Tornado to Ebessan to capture the Meibutsu Sekaiichi Championship.

=== Semifinals ===
In the first semi-final match of the tournament, Naomichi Marufuji defeated Garuda by pinning him with a La Magistral. The next semi-final took place between Takehiro Murakama and Wataru Inoue. The two exchanged momentum until Murakama hit a Brainbuster on Inoue to win the match.

In the following match, Billy Kenkid and Tigers Mask defended the Tag Team Championship against the team of Shiryu and Taka Michinoku in their second title defense of the tag team titles. Kid pinned Michinoku with a backslide to retain the titles.

The penultimate match of the event was a six-man tag team match, in which the veteran team of Jinsei Shinzaki, Jushin Thunder Liger and Super Delfin took on the team of young wrestlers Cima, Heat and Kenta. After a back and forth action, Cima hit a Schwein on Delfin to win the match.

=== Final ===
In the final round of the 2004 Super J-Cup, Naomichi Marufuji took on Takehiro Murakama. After a back and forth action, Marufuji executed a Shiranui from the top rope on Murakama to win the 2004 Super J-Cup tournament.

== Results ==
No.	Results	Stipulations	Times
1	Naomichi Marufuji defeated Jun Kasai	2004 Super J-Cup tournament quarter-final	8:16
2	Garuda defeated Goa	2004 Super J-Cup tournament quarter-final	7:01
3	Wataru Inoue defeated Kazuya Yuasa via submission	2004 Super J-Cup tournament quarter-final	9:25
4	Takehiro Murahama defeated Taichi Ishikari	2004 Super J-Cup tournament quarter-final	5:03
5	Ofune defeated Apple Miyuki	Singles match	6:52
6	Men's Teioh, MIKAMI and Tomohiro Ishii defeated Azteca, Kintaro Kanemura and MA-G-MA	Six-man tag team match	10:35
7	Kuishinbo Kamen defeated Ebessan (c)	Singles match for the Osaka Meibutsu Sekaiichi Championship	8:04
8	Naomichi Marufuji defeated Garuda	2004 Super J-Cup tournament semi-final	10:22
9	Takehiro Murahama defeated Wataru Inoue	2004 Super J-Cup tournament semi-final	9:30
10	Billyken Kid and Tigers Mask (c) defeated Shiryu and Taka Michinoku	Tag team match for the Osaka Pro Wrestling Tag Team Championship	12:55
11	Cima, Heat and Kenta defeated Jinsei Shinzaki, Jushin Thunder Liger and Super Delfin	Six-man tag team match	16:53
12	Naomichi Marufuji defeated Takehiro Murahama	2004 Super J-Cup tournament final	14:05
(c) / – the champion(s) heading into the match

=== Tournament brackets ===
Round 1
Naomichi Marufuji	Pin
Jun Kasai
Garuda	Pin
Goa
Wataru Inoue	Sub
Kazuya Yuasa
Takehiro Murahama	Pin
Taichi Ishikari

Semifinals
Naomichi Marufuji	Pin
Garuda
Wataru Inoue
Takehiro Murahama	Pin

Final
Naomichi Marufuji	Pin
Takehiro Murahama
