= Kuuga =

Kuuga may refer to:

- Kamen Rider Kuuga, a Japanese tokusatsu television series
- Kuuga (wrestler), Japanese professional wrestler
