= Osaka Pro Wrestling Championship =

Professional wrestling championship

- The current belt design

Details
- Promotion: Osaka Pro Wrestling
- Date established: January 4, 2000
- Current champion: Ryuya Matsufusa
- Date won: December 7, 2025

Other name
- Osaka Openweight Championship (2019–2022)
Statistics
- First champion: Super Delfin
- Most reigns: Billyken Kid (5 reigns)
- Longest reign: Tsubasa (883 days)
- Shortest reign: Daisuke Harada (28 days)

The Osaka Pro Wrestling Championship (Japanese: 大阪プロレス王座, Hepburn: Ōsaka Puroresu Ōza) is the top singles title in the Japanese professional wrestling promotion Osaka Pro Wrestling. The title was established in 2000 when Super Delfin defeated Dick Togo to be crowned the inaugural champion.

There have been a total of 22 recognized champions, who have had a combined 38 official reigns and there have been four vacancies. The current champion is Ryuya Matsufusa who is in his first reign.

== History ==
=== Names ===
Name	Years
Osaka Pro Wrestling Championship	January 4, 2000–January 18, 2019
Osaka Openweight Championship	January 18, 2019–May 1, 2022
Osaka Pro Wrestling Championship	May 1, 2022–present

On January 18, 2019, the title was renamed Osaka Openweight Championship (大阪無差別級王座, Ōsaka Musabetsu-kyū Ōza).

During the COVID-19 pandemic in Japan, Osaka Pro Wrestling (OPW) remained fairly inactive, having held only one event in 2020 and one in 2021. On July 30, 2021, Zeus was appointed as the owner and president of OPW. On August 26, he received a share transfer from former owner Yuji Sakagami. Following the acquisition, OPW underwent a "relaunch" in early 2022. On May 1, a new belt was unveiled and Zeus defeated Kazuaki Mihara to win the title, which was now once again referred to as the Osaka Pro Wrestling Championship.

== Reigns ==
Key
No.	Overall reign number
Reign	Reign number for the specific champion
Days	Number of days held
Defenses	Number of successful defenses
+	Current reign is changing daily

No.	Champion	Championship change			Reign statistics			Notes	Ref.
No.	Champion	Date	Event	Location	Reign	Days	Defenses	Notes	Ref.
Osaka Pro Wrestling (OPW)
1	Super Delfin	January 4, 2000	Legend Story	Osaka, Japan	1	124	1	Defeated Dick Togo to become the first champion.	
2	Takehiro Murahama	May 7, 2000	Osaka Pro 1st Anniversary Spicy Series	Tokyo, Japan	1	42	0		
3	Super Delfin	June 18, 2000	Dramatic Rain Series 2000	Osaka, Japan	2	371	1		
4	Gamma	June 24, 2001	Osaka Pro Story #3	Osaka, Japan	1	193	1		
5	Super Delfin	January 3, 2002	Osaka Pro Story #8	Osaka, Japan	3	394	3		
—	Vacated	February 1, 2003	Osaka Hurricane 03.02.01	Osaka, Japan	—	—	—	Super Delfin relinquished the title after defending it against "Big Boss" Ma-G-Ma.	
6	Takehiro Murahama	July 6, 2003	Osaka Pro Story #18	Osaka, Japan	2	286	3	Defeated Tsubasa in the finals of a 12-man tournament to win the vacant title.	
7	Daio Quällt	April 17, 2004	Osaka Pro Story #23	Osaka, Japan	1	113	1		
8	Billyken Kid	August 8, 2004	Osaka Pro Story #25	Osaka, Japan	1	55	1	This was a three-way match also involving Goa.	
9	"Big Boss" Ma-G-Ma	October 2, 2004	Saturday Night Story	Osaka, Japan	1	134	0		
10	Super Dolphin	February 13, 2005	Osaka Hurricane 2005	Osaka, Japan	1	378	3		
11	Super Delfin	February 26, 2006	Osaka Hurricane 2006	Osaka, Japan	4	181	2		
12	Billyken Kid	August 26, 2006	Saturday Night Story	Osaka, Japan	2	170	1		
13	Tigers Mask	February 12, 2007	Osaka Hurricane 2007	Osaka, Japan	1	530	6		
14	Hideyoshi	July 26, 2008	Saturday Night Story	Osaka, Japan	1	204	2		
15	Billyken Kid	February 15, 2009	Osaka Hurricane 2009	Osaka, Japan	3	160	2		
16	Dick Togo	July 25, 2009	Saturday Night Story	Osaka, Japan	1	201	2		
17	Billyken Kid	February 11, 2010	Osaka Hurricane 2010	Osaka, Japan	4	127	2		
18	Cima	June 18, 2010	Hanshin Pro-Wrestling Battle: Dragon Gate vs. Osaka Pro Wrestling	Osaka, Japan	1	41	1	This was a joint show with Dragon Gate.	
19	Tigers Mask	July 29, 2010	Rainbow Gate 2010	Osaka, Japan	2	30	0	This match was also for Tigers Mask's Open the Brave Gate Championship. This was a Dragon Gate show.	
20	Asian Cougar	August 28, 2010	Summer Achoo Series	Osaka, Japan	1	244	2	Asian Cougar changed his name to Kuuga during this reign.	
21	Tigers Mask	April 29, 2011	Osaka Pro 12th Anniversary Show	Osaka, Japan	3	107	1		
22	Billyken Kid	August 14, 2011	Osaka Hurricane 2011	Osaka, Japan	5	196	2		
23	Daisuke Harada	February 26, 2012	Saturday Night Story	Osaka, Japan	1	28	0		
24	Black Buffalo	March 25, 2012	Osaka Holiday Paradise	Osaka, Japan	1	119	1		
25	Daisuke Harada	July 22, 2012	Osaka Hurricane 2012	Osaka, Japan	2	251	1		
—	Vacated	March 30, 2013	—	—	—	—	—	Harada relinquished the title when he announced his departure from the promotion effective on April 29, 2013.	
26	Tigers Mask	May 19, 2013	Osaka Holiday Paradise	Osaka, Japan	4	63	0	Defeated Billyken Kid in the finals of a 4-man tournament to win the vacant title.	
27	Quiet Storm	July 21, 2013	Osaka Pro-Wrestling Story	Osaka, Japan	1	182	1	This was a No Disqualification match.	
28	Zeus	January 19, 2014	Osaka Tornado Vol. 4	Osaka, Japan	1	91	1		
—	Vacated	April 20, 2014	—	—	—	—	—	Title was vacated when Osaka Pro announced the promotion would fold on April 20, 2014 due to financial difficulties.	
29	Tadasuke	January 31, 2016	Osaka Pro's Business Is Thriving!: Tennōzan Final	Osaka, Japan	1	182	1	Defeated Kaiju New World in the final of the Tennōzan to win the vacant title.	
30	Hub	July 31, 2016	Osaka Pro-Wrestling Has Come to Konohana	Osaka, Japan	2	511	4	Hub previously held the title under the name Super Dolphin.	
31	Kushikatsu Oyaji	December 24, 2017	Big Year End Party 2017	Osaka, Japan	1	419	1	The championship was renamed Osaka Openweight Championship on January 18, 2019.	
32	Tsubasa	February 16, 2019	Osaka Pro-Wrestling Came Over! in Suminoe	Osaka, Japan	1	883	2		
33	Kazuaki Mihara	July 18, 2021	Osaka Pro-Wrestling 22nd Anniversary	Osaka, Japan	1	287	0		
34	Zeus	May 1, 2022	Launching Business 3rd Round	Osaka, Japan	2	453	2	Title reverted back to its original name of Osaka Pro Wrestling Championship.	
—	Vacated	July 28, 2023	—	—	—	—	—	Zeus vacated the title after having suffered a broken nose on July 17, which would prevent him from defending the title as scheduled.	
35	Quiet Storm	August 20, 2023	Osaka Pro Summer Festival 2023	Osaka, Japan	2	370	2	Defeated Tigers Mask to win the vacant title.	
36	Zeus	August 24, 2024	Osaka Pro Summer Festival 2024	Osaka, Japan	3	127	0		
37	Toru	December 29, 2024	Osaka Pro Excalibur 2024	Osaka, Japan	1	343	5		
38	Ryuya Matsufusa	December 7, 2025	Osaka Pro Excalibur 2025	Osaka, Japan	1	279+	3		

== Combined reigns ==
As of September 12, 2026.

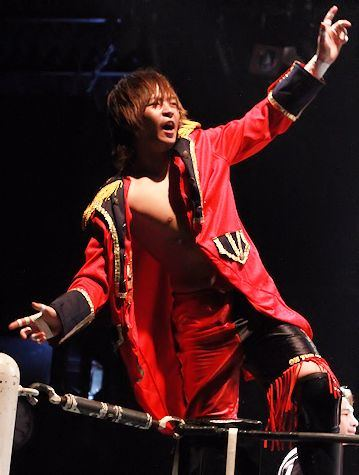
Former one-time champion Toru.

†	Indicates the current champion

Rank	Wrestler	No. of reigns	Combined defenses	Combined days
1	Super Delfin	4	5	1,070
2	Super Dolphin/Hub	2	3	891
3	Tsubasa	1	2	883
4	Tigers Mask	4	6	730
5	Billyken Kid	5	8	708
6	Zeus	3	3	671
7	Quiet Storm	2	3	552
8	Kushikatsu Oyaji	1	1	419
9	Toru	1	5	343
10	Takehiro Murahama	2	2	328
11	Kazuaki Mihara	1	0	287
12	Ryuya Matsufusa †	1	3	279+
13	Daisuke Harada	2	1	279
14	Asian Cougar/Kuuga	1	2	244
15	Hideyoshi	1	2	204
16	Dick Togo	1	2	201
17	Gamma	1	1	193
18	Tadasuke	1	0	182
19	"Big Boss" Ma-G-Ma	1	0	134
20	Black Buffalo	1	1	119
21	Daio Quällt	1	1	113
22	Cima	1	0	41

== See also ==
- Osaka Pro Wrestling Battle Royal Championship
- Osaka Pro Wrestling Tag Team Championship
