= Masamune (wrestler) =

Japanese professional wrestler (born 1974)

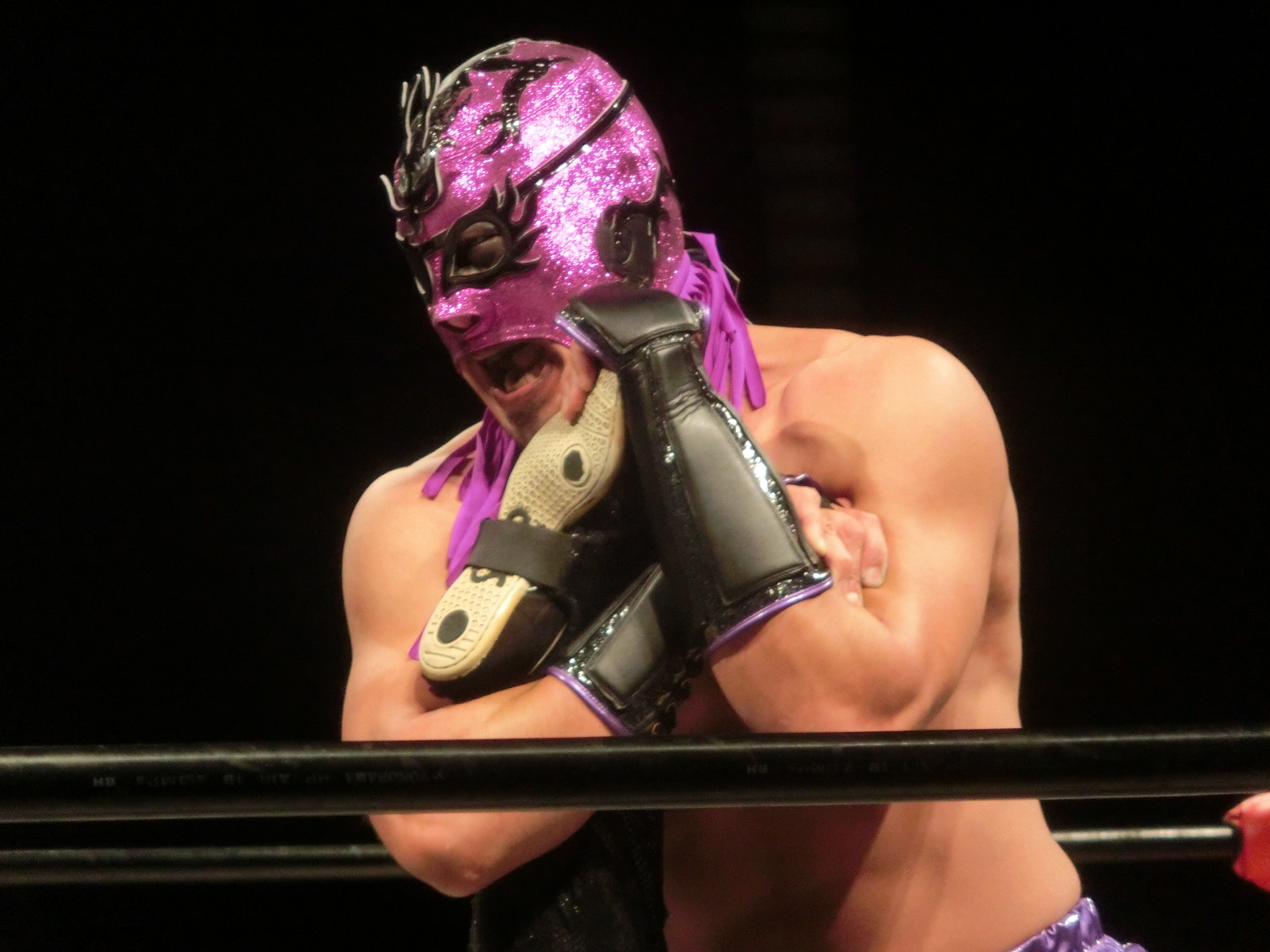
- Masamune in 2019

Personal information
- Born: August 16, 1974 (age 52) Sendai, Miyagi, Japan

Professional wrestling career
- Ring name(s): Dragon Furia; Furia del Dragon; Masamune; Rakute Masamune
- Billed height: 1.73 m (5 ft 8 in)
- Billed weight: 78 kg (172 lb)
- Trained by: Lizmark
- Debut: April 1999

Masamune (Japanese: 政宗; born August 16, 1974) is a masked Japanese professional wrestler. He currently works for Dotonbori Pro Wrestling and has also worked for Kaientai Dojo (K-Dojo) and Osaka Pro Wrestling (OPW) in Japan. For several years he formed a tag team with Japanese wrestler Hideyoshi and was also part of a group known as Bad Force. Greatly influenced by lucha libre, Masamune has followed Mexican tradition for masked wrestlers, so his real name is not a matter of public record.

== Professional wrestling career ==
The masked wrestler known as Masamune made his professional wrestling debut in Mexico in April 1999, after being trained by Mexican Luchador Lizmark. Initially he wrestled under the ring names Dragon Furia or Furia del Dragon ("Dragon Fury" or "Fury of the Dragon") but later adopted the ring name Masamune. The Masamune character was inspired by Japanese Daimyo feudal lord Date Masamune, which in part is reflected in his mask, which has what looks like an eye patch over one eye just like Date Masamune only had one eye. Due to his mask design Masamune earned the nickname dokuganryū (the "one-eyed dragon"), just like the original Masamune.

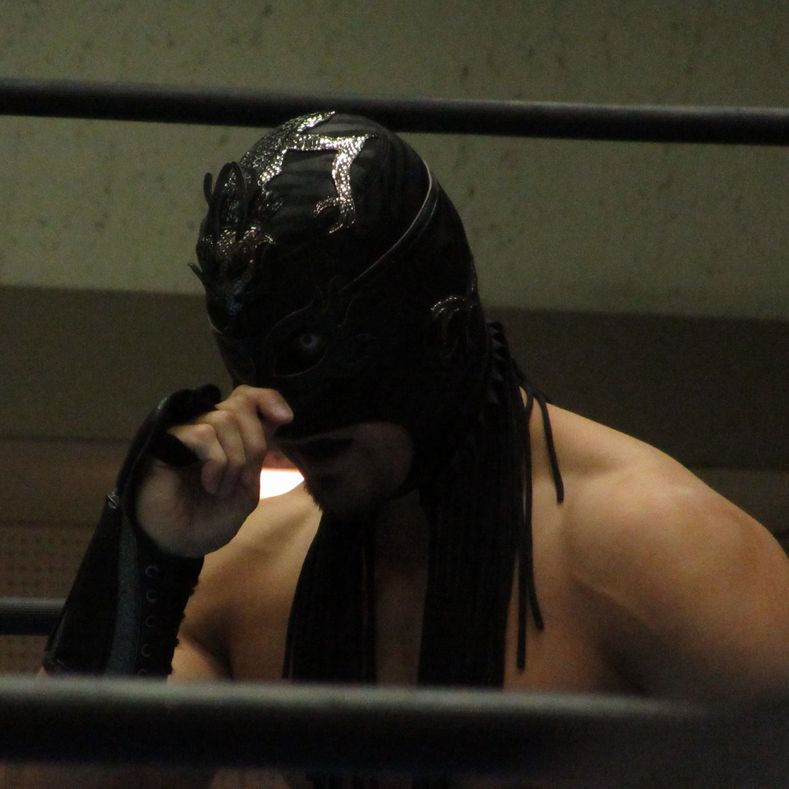
Masamune in June 2016.

After initially working as a freelancer, by 2005, Masamune had made Osaka Pro Wrestling (Osaka Pro) his home promotion, teaming with Hideyoshi, another masked wrestler with a "samurai" ring character, collectively known as Sengoku, after the Sengoku period in Japan. The team's first notable achievement came in July 2005, where they competed in the first ever Osaka Tag Festival. In the first round Sengoku defeated Kuishinbo Kamen and Ebessan II, in the semi-finals they defeated Tsubasa and Billyken Kid and finally the team of Super Delfin and Tigers Mask to win the entire tournament. The tournament victory also meant that Sengoku won the vacant Osaka Pro Wrestling Tag Team Championship at the same time. The championship reign was ended 56 days later, when they lost to a team known as Universal Global Members (Billyken Kid and Tsubasa). On February 12, 2007, Sengoku defeated the team of Gaina and Zeus to win the Osata Pro Wrestling Tag Team Championship once more. At some point in 2007, Masamune and Hideyoshi joined up with Atsushi Kotoge, Black Buffalo, Condor, Gaina, Kazushi, Zero and Zeus to form a group known as "Bad Force". On August 26, 2007, they lost the championship to Kagetora and Rasse. Sengoku competed in, and won the 2009 Osaka Tag Festival, defeating Asian Cougar and Miracle Man in the first round, Tigers Mask and Black Buffalo in the second round and Orochi and Tadasuke in the finals. Sengoku's third Osaka Tag Team Championship run began on July 18, 2009, when they defeated former "Bad Force" partners Black Buffalo and Tigers Match to win the championship. The third reign was their longest, at 208 days, until they lost the championship to Atsushi Kotoge and Daisuke Harada. On July 19, 2009, Masamune won a battle royal to win the Osaka Pro Wrestling Battle Royal Championship The title had the special stipulation that it could only be defended in battle royals, which is how Masamune lost the championship to Kanjyuro Matsuyama on March 21, 2010. Masamune began working for El Dorado Wrestling in 2010 as well, teaming with Minoru Fujita to defeat Speed of Sounds (Hercules Senga and Tsutomu Oosugi) to win the UWA World Tag Team Championship, holding the title for 344 days until Speed of Sounds regained the title.

In 2013, Osaka Pro Wrestling announced that they were closing, which led to a number of wrestlers jumping to Dotonbori Pro Wrestling (DPW). By the time Osaka Pro Wrestling revealed that they had secured financial backing and was not closing, a number of wrestlers, including Masamune, had already committed to DPW. The Joker group reformed in DPW, consisting of Kuuga, Gamelas, Kazuaki Mihara and Masamune, effectively ending Sengoku after being a regular team for seven years. Masamune teamed up with former rival Billyken Kid to win the Second Dotonbori Tag King tournament when they defeated Super Sonic (Daisuke Masaoka and Rapid) to win the tournament as well as the WDW Tag Team Championship. In April 2015, it was announced that Masamune had been selected to represent All Japan Pro Wrestling (AJPW) in the Lucha Libre AAA World Wide (AAA) promoted Lucha Libre World Cup, despite having only wrestled a few matches for AJPW. Masamune and his partners Kenzo Suzuki and Tiger Mask III were eliminated from the tournament in the first round by Team MexLeyendas (Blue Demon Jr., Dr. Wagner Jr. and El Solar).

== Championships and accomplishments ==
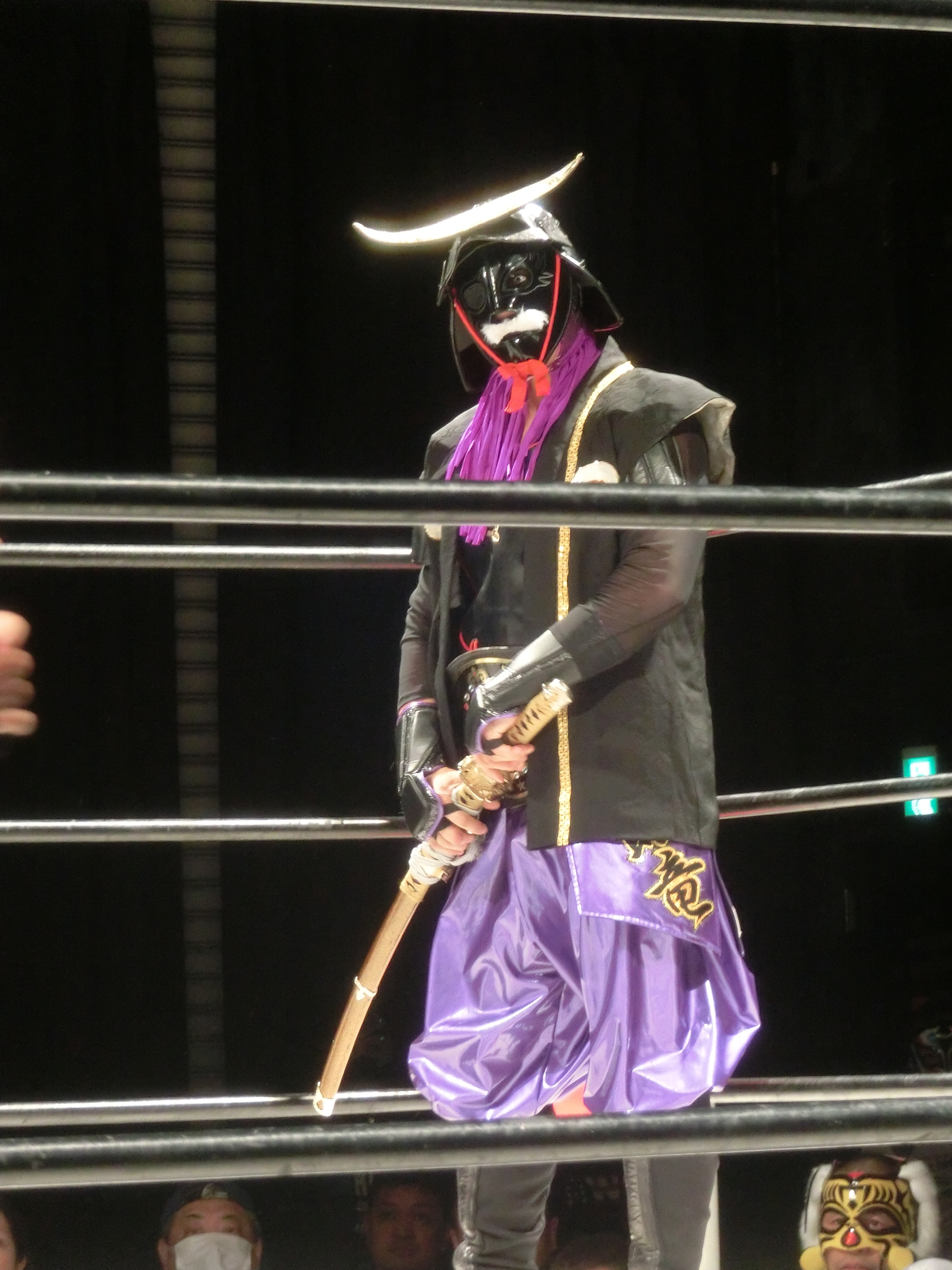
Masamune in June 2019.

- Dotonbori Pro Wrestling
  - WDW World Tag Team Championship (1 time, current) – with Billyken Kid
  - Second Dotonbori Tag King – with Billyken Kid
- El Dorado Wrestling / Kohaku Puroresu Gassen
  - UWA World Tag Team Championship (1 time) – with Minoru Fujita
- Kaientai Dojo
  - UWA World Middleweight Championship (1 time)
- Osaka Pro Wrestling
  - Osaka Pro Wrestling Battle Royal Championship (1 time)
  - Osaka Pro Wrestling Tag Team Championship (3 times) – with Hideyoshi
  - Osaka Tag Festival (2005, 2009) – with Hideyoshi
- Pro-Wrestling Basara
  - UWA World Trios Championship (1 time) – with Billyken Kid and Tsubasa
- Pro Wrestling Illustrated
  - Ranked No. 422 of the top 500 singles wrestlers in the PWI 500 in 2019
- Pro Wrestling Zero1
  - NWA International Lightweight Tag Team Championship (1 time) – with Sugi
