= Kuuga (wrestler) =

Japanese professional wrestler

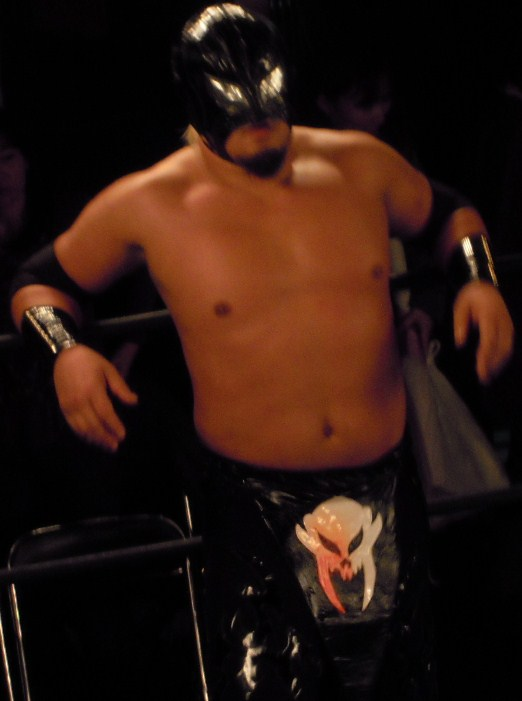
- Kuuga in April 2011

Personal information
- Born: Arida, Japan

Professional wrestling career
- Ring name(s): Asian Coogar; Asian Cougar; Asian Cooger; Kappa Boy; Kappa Komachi; Kuuga; Sorakiba; Vancouver Cougar
- Billed height: 174 cm (5 ft 9 in)
- Trained by: Gran Hamada; Yoshiaki Yatsu
- Debut: 1995

Kuuga (空牙, Kūgā) is a Japanese professional masked wrestler. Greatly influenced by lucha libre, he is best known for his Osaka Pro Wrestling and Dotonbori Pro Wrestling promotions.

== Career ==
=== Independent circuit ===
Kuuga made his professional wrestling debut at SPWF Fierce Fighting October Series, an event promoted by Social Pro Wrestling Federation, on October 13, 1995. Teaming with Asian Condor, he lost to Masahiko Kochi and Toyonari Fujita in a tag team match.

Over the following decades, Kuuga became a regular presence on the Japanese independent circuit, competing for a variety of promotions as a freelancer. In 2003, he participated in Pro Wrestling Noah's Differ Cup junior heavyweight tag tournament under the name Kappa Kozo, teaming with The Great Takeru to represent the promotion IWA Japan. The pair lost to Kenta and Kotaro Suzuki in a first-round match. At JWP Climax 2005 on December 3, 2005, he teamed with Baby-M and Baye-L in a loss to Command Bolshoi, Darkside Bolshoi and Darkside Hero in a six-person tag team match. Two years later, he teamed with Chikayo Nagashima at Oz Academy's OZ Mysterious Dance event, where they lost to Sonoko Kato and Atsushi Kotoge.

By the mid-2010s, Kuuga remained active on the Japanese independent circuit. At FREEDOMS Daisuke Masaoka 10th Anniversary on October 19, 2014, he teamed with Jun Kasai to defeat UNCHAIN (Kenji Fukimoto and Masashi Takeda). Later that year, he competed in a 24-man battle royal at Tenryu Project/VKF ~Survive~, alongside wrestlers including Genichiro Tenryu. On March 25, 2017, Kuuga and Billy Ken Kid defeated B Faultless Junky's (Jaki Numazawa and Masashi Takeda) to win the WDW Tag Team Championship at BJW BJ Style 12. Later that year, he teamed with Gaina in a loss to Burning Wild (Jun Akiyama and Takao Omori) at AJPW Zeus Festival 2017.

==== DDT Pro-Wrestling ====
Kuuga worked for DDT Pro-Wrestling under the name of Asian Cougar. He is known for competing in various of the promotion's signature events such as DDT Judgement, making his first appearance at the first-ever event under this branch, the Judgement 1997 from March 25 where he defeated Kyohei Mikami. His last appearance occurred at Judgement 6 on March 25, 2002, where he teamed up with Onryo to unsuccessfully challenge Mikami and Takashi Sasaki for the KO-D Tag Team Championship.

==== New Japan Pro Wrestling ====
Kuuga wrestled in severaltour matches organized by New Japan Pro Wrestling. His first appearance occurred at NJPW Lock Up on July 29, 2006, where he teamed up with Gentaro to defeat Hirooki Goto and Minoru. At NJPW Circuit 2010 New Japan Brave on April 30, he teamed up with Ryusuke Taguchi to defeat Akira Nogami and Tiger Mask.

==== Osaka Pro Wrestling ====
Kuuga is probably best known for his time in Osaka Pro Wrestling. He participated in one of the promotion's signature events, the Osaka Hurricane, making his first appearance at the 2007 edition of the event on February 12, where he fell short against Super Dolphin. At the 2008 edition of the event, he teamed up with The Great Sasuke to defeat Tigers Mask and Black Buffalo for the Osaka Tag Team Championship.

== Championships and accomplishments ==
- DDT Pro-Wrestling
  - Ironman Heavymetalweight Championship (2 times)
- Dotonbori Pro Wrestling
  - WDW Championship (1 time)
  - WDW Tag Team Championship (1 time) – with Billy Ken Kid

- Doutonbori Saikyo Tag King Kettei Tournament (2015) – with Magnitude Kishiwada

- Elite Canadian Championship Wrestling
  - ECCW Pacific Cup (2000)
- International Wrestling Association Japan
  - IWA World Junior Heavyweight Championship (1 time)
- National Wrestling Alliance
  - NWA Canadian Junior Heavyweight Championship (1 time)
- Osaka Pro Wrestling
  - Osaka Openweight Championship (1 time)
  - Osaka Tag Team Championship (4 times) – with Tsubasa (1), The Great Sasuke (1), Orochi (1) and Hayata (1)
  - MWF World Junior Heavyweight Championship (1 time)
  - Tennōzan (2010)
- Tenryu Project
  - International Junior Heavyweight Tag Team Championship (1 time) – with Gamerasu
- Thrash Wrestling
  - Thrash Wrestling Championship (1 time)
