= Magnitude Kishiwada =

Japanese professional wrestler

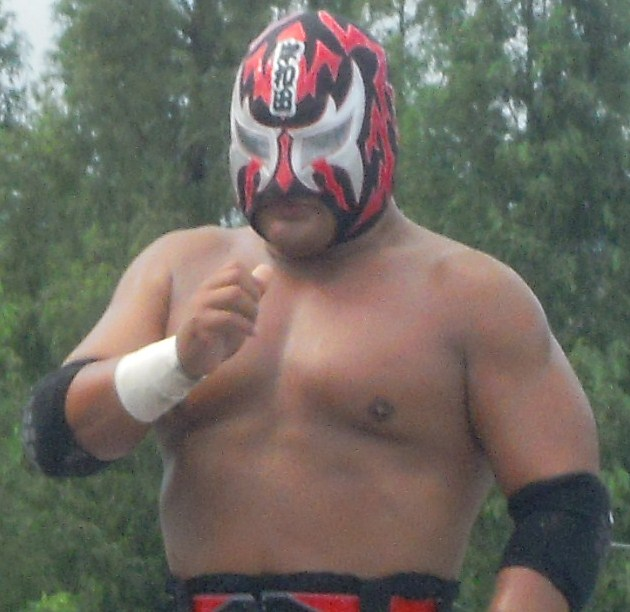

Personal information
- Born: May 9, 1971 (age 55) Kishiwada, Osaka, Japan

Professional wrestling career
- Ring names: "Big Boss" Ma-g-ma; Dragon Winger; Kaijyu Z Mandra; Magnitude Kishiwada; Magnitude Tokyo; Toryu
- Billed height: 1.75 m (5 ft 9 in)
- Billed weight: 91 kg (201 lb)
- Trained by: Mr. Pogo; Super Delfín
- Debut: January 20, 1993

Toyonari Fujita (藤田 豊成, Fujita Toyonari; born May 9, 1971), better known under his ring name Magnitude Kishiwada (マグニチュード岸和田, Magunichūdo Kishiwada), is a Japanese professional wrestler.

== Career ==
During high school, Fujita trained in artistic gymnastics, mixed martial arts, and powerlifting, becoming interested in professional wrestling after graduation. Fujita trained and participated in preliminary matches in Japan's hardcore wrestling promotions, including FMW, W*ING, and Big Japan Pro Wrestling. He competed under his real name and with the ring name Toryu (闘龍, Tōryū; lit. "Fighting Dragon").

=== Osaka Pro Wrestling (1999–2005) ===
In 1999, he joined Osaka Pro, where he became a kaiju character named Kaijyu Z Mandra (怪獣Zマンドラ, Kaijū Zēta Mandora). He gained fame in late 2001 by turning heel, donning a more traditional wrestling mask, and renaming himself "Big Boss" Ma-g-ma ("ビッグボス"MA-G-MA, Biggu Bosu Maguma). He left the promotion in 2005.

=== Dragon Gate (2005–2010, 2012) ===
His debut in Dragon Gate was heavily hyped, first arriving wearing a motorcycle helmet, referring to himself as "Big Boss" Ma-g-ma. In what was to be his debut match, a singles match against Cima, he instead removed the helmet and embraced Cima, joining his faction of Blood Generation and renaming himself Magnitude Kishiwada (from the magnitude of an earthquake and the name of his hometown). The addition of Kishiwada to Blood Generation was unusual, since one of the principles of Blood Generation was a "clean face" (i.e. maskless and paintless faces), but Cima claimed the rule was only designed to prevent Super Shisa joining when the group was created. Kishiwada ended Masaaki Mochizuki's 11-month reign as Open the Dream Gate Champion, becoming the first non DG-trueborn to win the Dream Gate title. He would suffer a severe shoulder injury, and drop the Dream Gate to Ryo Saito.

Kishiwada brought Gamma, his running partner from Osaka Pro, into Blood Generation as a replacement while he recovered. Gamma and Cima clashed, splitting Blood Generation in half, with Cima leading a smaller face faction, and Naruki Doi and Gamma leading a heel faction. Doi's faction won the rights to Blood Generation's name, but immediately renounced it, instead renaming themselves the Muscle Outlaw'z. Upon his return, Kishiwada allied with the MO'z.

Kishiwada began making fewer appearances for Dragon Gate. In 2007 he joined the Global Professional Wrestling Alliance, limiting his Dragon Gate time even further. As part of the GPWA, he has appeared in El Dorado, allied with heel faction Hell Demons. As many of the wrestlers in Dorado were formerly part of the Dragon system, and in a few cases on bad terms with the system, his participation in Dorado and Dragon Gate at the same time is considered controversial.

With the Muscle Outlaw'z stable in Dragon Gate over, Magnitude Kishiwada joined forces with Masaaki Mochizuki and Don Fujii in an "over 30" team, his first non-heel role in years. Their team would become Open the Triangle Gate Champions on September 28, 2008, beating Yasushi Kanda, Yamato and Gamma. In 2009, Kishiwada returned to Osaka Pro to participate in the company's 2009 Tennōzan tournament, beating Daisuke Harada, Black Buffalo, and Atsushi Kotoge before losing to Billyken Kid in the finals of the tournament.

By the end of 2009 he had stopped appearing on Dragon Gate cards, before returning in 2012 as a member of Kaettekita Veteran-gun. He would also make sporadic appearances over the next years.

== Championships and accomplishments ==
- Doutonbori Pro Wrestling

- WDW Single Championship (1 time)
- Doutonbori Saikyo Otoko Tournament (2016)
- Doutonbori Saikyo Tag King Kettei Tournament (2015) – with Kuuga

- Dragon Gate

- Dragon Gate Open the Dream Gate Championship (1 time)
- Dragon Gate Open the Triangle Gate Championship (5 times) – Gamma and Naruki Doi (1), Cima and Masato Yoshino (1), Masato Yoshino and Naruki Doi (1), Don Fujii and Masaaki Mochizuki (1), and Gamma and Hub (1)

- Osaka Pro Wrestling

- Osaka Pro Wrestling Championship (1 time)
- Osaka Pro Wrestling Tag Team Championship (2 times) – with Takehiro Murahama (1) and Daio Quällt (1)
- Osaka Pro Wrestling Battle Royal Championship (1 time)
- Tennōzan (2002, 2003, 2004)

== Mixed martial arts record ==
Professional record breakdown
1 match	0 wins	1 loss
By knockout	0	0
By submission	0	1
By decision	0	0

Res.	Record	Opponent	Method	Event	Date	Round	Time	Location	Notes
Loss	0–1	(Japan) Yasunori Okuda	Submission (armbar)	Professional Shooting Vol.28	March 18, 1994	1	0:25	Tokyo, Japan	
