= Super Shisa =

Japanese professional wrestler

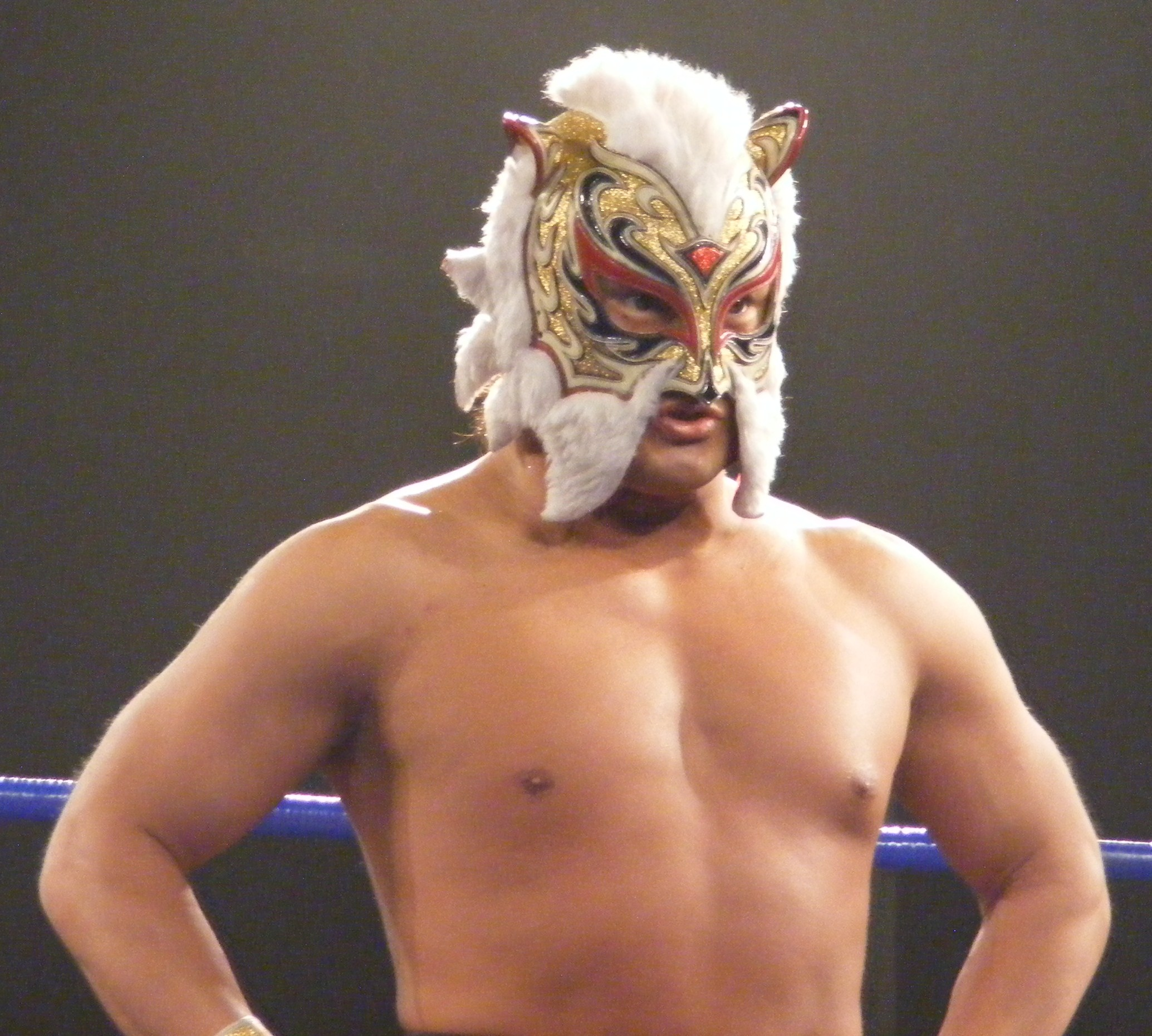
- Super Shisa in April 2011

Personal information
- Born: Yoshiyuki Saito; April 9, 1970 (age 56) Naha-shi, Okinawa, Japan

Professional wrestling career
- Ring names: Saito; Yoshiyuki Saito; Super Ciesar; Super Shisa
- Billed height: 1.78 m (5 ft 10 in)
- Billed weight: 77 kg (170 lb)
- Trained by: Último Dragón; Dos Caras
- Debut: June 30, 1996

Yoshiyuki Saito (斉藤 義之, Saitō Yoshiyuki; born April 9, 1970) is a Japanese professional wrestler and restaurant owner best known by his ring name Super Shisa (スペル・シーサー, Superu Shīsā; alternatively spelled Super Ciesar). He is best known for wrestling in Dragon Gate, where he was employed from its inception until April 2022. His gimmick is inspired by the Ryukyuan Shisa. He claimed to be a student of Toryumon alumni Saito, but was outed as being Saito himself in 2007.

== Career ==
=== As Saito ===
Saito got his start in wrestling with Último Dragón's upstart promotion Toryumon. He trained in Mexico with the rest of the Último Dragón students, and briefly used the Super Shisa gimmick while there. He wrestled January 31, 1999, on Toryumon's debut show. Wrestling under his real name, he teamed with Magnum Tokyo and Dragon Kid to take on Shima Nobunaga, Sumo Fuji and Judo Suwa in an elimination match on the main event of the card. Saito would be eliminated second following a Nodowa Elbow from Fuji, but his team would go on to win the match.

He would continue to be a top line player in early Toryumon, and would rename to Saito. In the spring of 2000, he and fellow Toryumon participant Chocoball Kobe would wrestle in Pro Wrestling Kageki. Saito would win the Hakata City Jr Heavyweight Title in a tournament, defeating Daiyu Kawuchi in the final round.

He abruptly announced his retirement in late 2001, and stated that his first student, Super Shisa, would take his place. Saito would be given a "Sayonara Saito" series of matches by Toryumon. His record in the series was 0-5-1, the draw being a double countout against Yasushi Kanda. His final match as Saito would be a loss to Shuji Kondo on 10/28/2001.

=== As Super Shisa ===
Super Shisa would debut on August 11, 2001, wrestling a 10-minute draw with Kenichiro Arai.

Shisa has spent most of his career in both Toryumon and Dragon Gate near the bottom of the card, rarely joining units. He was a member of a short-lived unit called Waku Waku Fuji Land, led by Don Fujii. Waku Waku Fuji Land was designed to bridge the gap between Crazy Max and the soon-to-form Blood Generation. As Blood Generation was based on a clean face (no masks or face paint) concept, Fuji gave Shisa an ultimatum: unmask or you may not join Blood Generation. The ultimatum prompted the fans to begin chanting Saito's name, but Shisa quickly opted to leave rather than unmask.

Shisa then aligned with Magnum Tokyo's PosHearts unit. PosHearts would go on hiatus due to an injury to Tokyo, and Shisa spent the latter part of 2005 and much of 2006 teaming with King Shisa, and occasionally with Dragon Gate dojo student Shisa Boy. The team broke up when King Shisa was outed as being Mexican heel Pentagon Black, and reverted to that gimmick.

Towards the end of 2006, PosHearts would reunite, and Shisa would win his first title in Toryumon / Dragon Gate, winning the Open the Triangle Gate titles with stablemates BxB Hulk and Anthony W. Mori. The success was short-lived, as PosHearts lost the titles to the Muscle Outlaw'z, and then lost a follow-up match forcing them to disband as a stable. It was during this match that Shisa was outed as being Saito; damage to the mask and blood loss forced him to voluntarily demask.

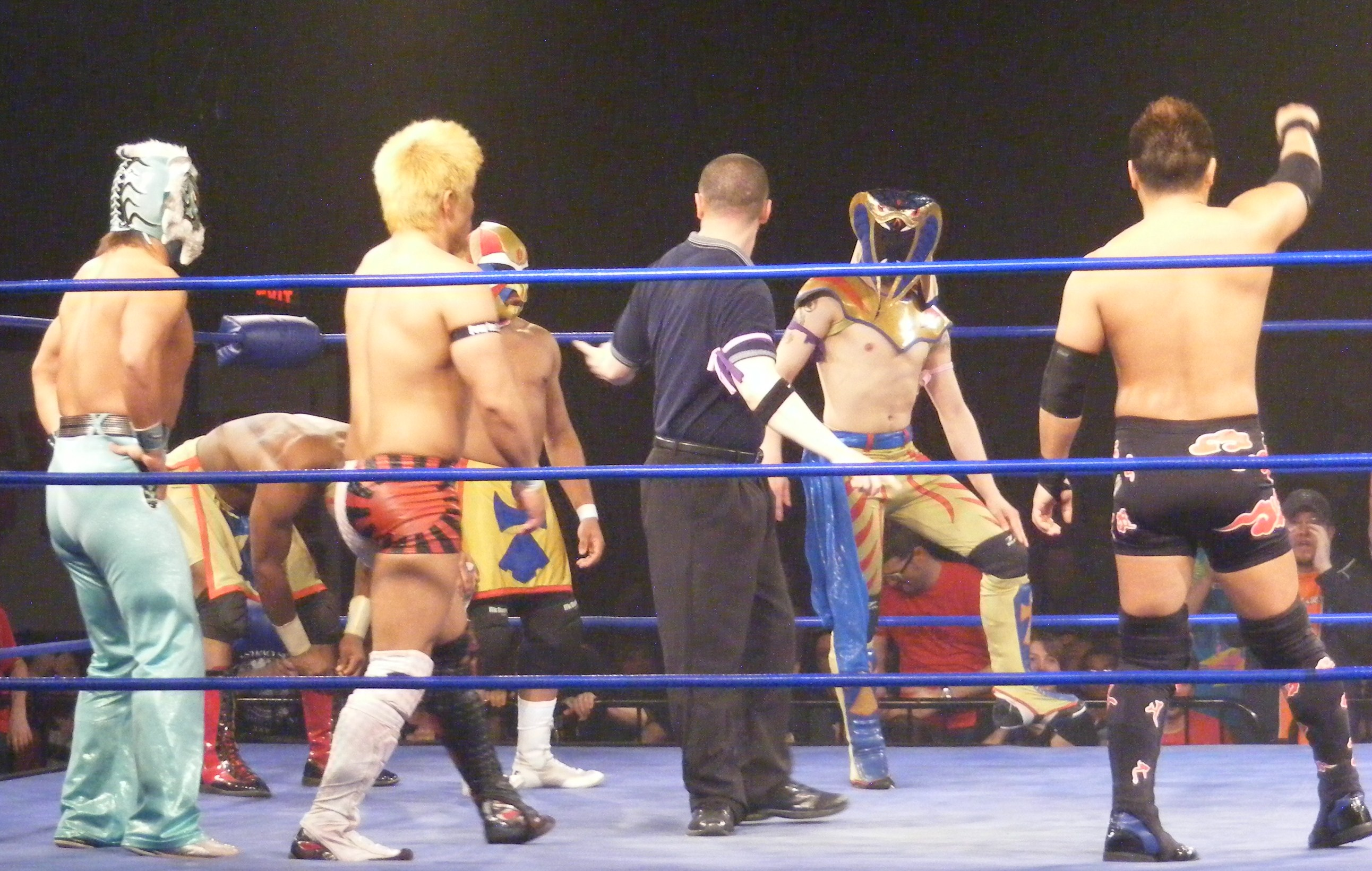
Shisa, along with Akira Tozawa and Kagetora represent Dragon Gate in the 2011 King of Trios tournament, where they faced the Osirian Portal in the quarter-finals.

Since the dissolution of PosHearts, Shisa has remained unaligned and wrestling low on the card. He is a trainer in the Dragon Gate dojo, and focuses primarily on those duties. While wrestling on the main roster, Shisa aligns with the "Mushozoku" Unit, a group of older wrestlers including Masaaki Mochizuki, K-ness and Magnitude Kishiwada. Aside from Dragon Gate, Shisa spends time in various smaller Japanese independent promotions.

On February 27, 2010, his ranking in the promotion improved significantly when he defeated K-ness to become the Open the Brave Gate Champion. He held the title for just under two months before losing it to Tigers Mask of Osaka Pro Wrestling.

On April 15, 2011, Shisa represented Team Dragon Gate in the 2011 King of Trios tournament along with Akira Tozawa and Kagetora. In the first round of the tournament, Team Dragon Gate defeated the Spectral Envoy (UltraMantis Black, Hallowicked and Frightmare). The following day, Team Dragon Gate was eliminated from the tournament in the quarter-final stage by The Osirian Portal (Amasis, Hieracon and Ophidian). On April 17, the final day of the tournament, Shisa and KAGETORA took part in a gauntlet tag match and were the final team to enter, but they were defeated by Atsushi Kotoge and Daisuke Harada.

==== The Shisa lineage ====
Other wrestlers with a Shisa gimmick have appeared in Dragon Gate, aligned with Super Shisa. One of the current dojo students is Shisa Boy. Mexican wrestler Pentagon Black spent several months in Dragon Gate as King Shisa. Introduced as the leader of the Shisa clan, King Shisa was pushed further than Super Shisa ever was, even going so far as to get a Dream Gate title shot. He was eventually outed as being Pentagon Black by the Muscle Outlaw'z, and joined them.

== Personal life ==
Saito is the owner of a taco shop in Engaru, Hokkaido. He is a supporter of the Liberal Democratic Party (LDP), and frequently uses X (Twitter) to retweet anti-LGBT and anti-immigration statements by LDP politicians.

== Championships and accomplishments ==
- Dragon Gate
  - Dragon Gate Open the Triangle Gate Championship (1 time) – with BxB Hulk and Anthony W. Mori
  - Dragon Gate Open the Brave Gate Championship (1 time)
- Osaka Pro Wrestling
  - Osaka Pro Wrestling Tag Team Championship (1 time) – with Gamma
- Pro-Wrestling Kageki
  - Hakata City Junior Heavyweight Championship (1 time)
