= Miyawaki (wrestler) =

Japanese professional wrestler

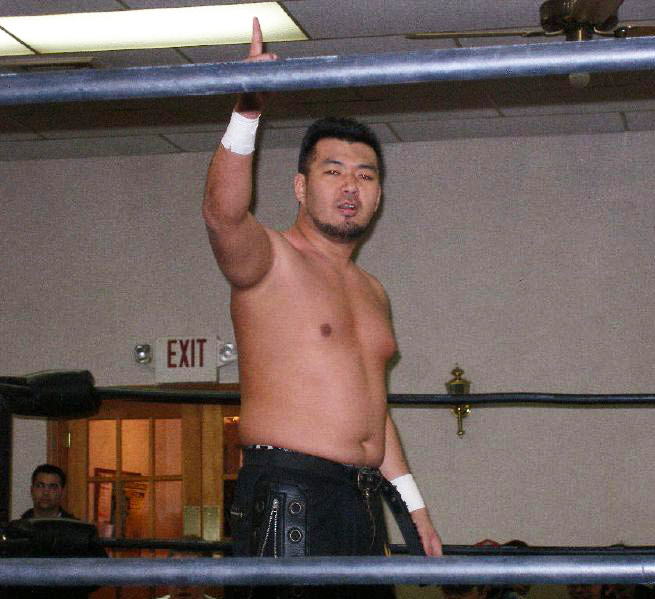
- Miyawaki in February 2007

Personal information
- Born: June 28, 1977 (age 49) Osaka, Japan

Professional wrestling career
- Ring name(s): Harley Miyawaki; Miyawaki; Orochi
- Billed height: 1.81 m (5 ft 11 1/2 in)
- Billed weight: 95 kg (209 lb)
- Debut: October 18, 2001

Miyawaki (stylized in all capital letters; born June 28, 1977) is a Japanese professional wrestler, best known for his work in the Kaientai Dojo and Osaka Pro Wrestling promotions. He has also wrestled in the United States for Chikara and Pro Wrestling Guerrilla (PWG).

== Professional wrestling career ==
Miyawaki made his professional wrestling debut in Puerto Rico, facing Super Crazy on October 18, 2001. Upon his return to Japan, he joined the Apache Pro-Wrestling Army promotion, where he spent his first years in the business, before making Kaientai Dojo his new home promotion. Miyawaki won his first professional wrestling title on May 6, 2007, when he and Yoshiya defeated Saburo Inematsu and Yuji Hino for the Strongest-K Tag Team Championship. A year later, Miyawaki won the title for the second time with Kazma.

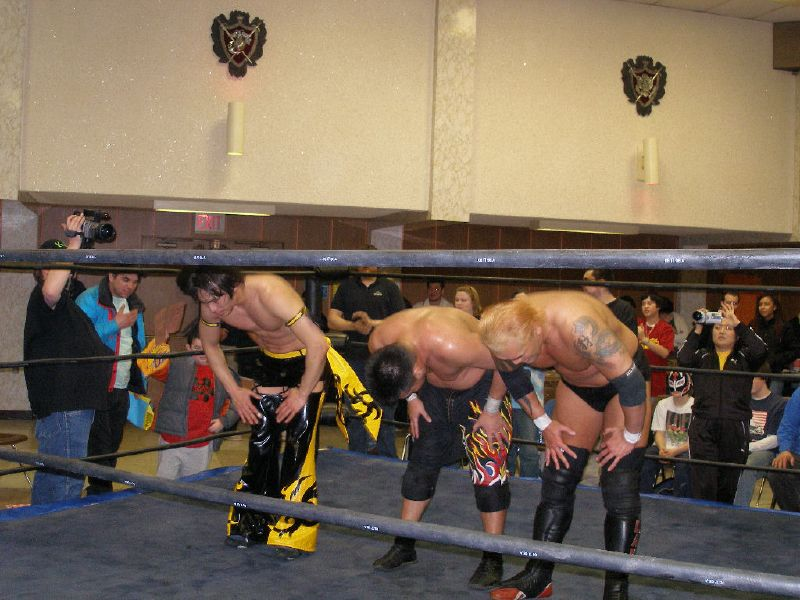
(Left to right) Kudo, Miyawaki and Yoshiaki Yago at Chikara King of Trios in February 2007

Miyawaki has also made several wrestling trips to the United States. In February 2006, he took part in Chikara's 2006 Tag World Grand Prix, where he and Yoshiaki Yago made it to the second round before losing to compatriots Kudo and Mikami. Miyawaki and Yago returned to the promotion the following May to unsuccessfully challenge The Kings of Wrestling (Chris Hero and Claudio Castagnoli) for the Chikara Campeonatos de Parejas. In February 2007, Miyawaki took part in Chikara's first-ever King of Trios tournament, where he, Yago and Kudo made it all the way to the finals, before losing to Jigsaw, Mike Quackenbush and Shane Storm. A year later, Miyawaki, Kudo and Susumu made it to the quarterfinals of the 2008 King of Trios tournament, before losing to Eddie Kingston, Joker and Ruckus. The following July, Miyawaki made his debut for Southern California-based Pro Wrestling Guerrilla (PWG), teaming with Kazma in a three-way tag team match, where they were defeated by The Young Bucks (Matt and Nick Jackson).

On November 20, 2008, Miyawaki made his debut for Osaka Pro Wrestling as the masked character Orochi. He initially joined the rudo army, but in 2010 turned on the group and joined a new stable named Joker, as a member of which he went on to become a two-time Osaka Pro Wrestling Tag Team Champion and a one-time Osaka Pro Wrestling Owarai and Independent World Junior Heavyweight Champion. In April 2013, Orochi, along with Joker stablemates Hayata, Hideyoshi, Kuuga and Masamune left Osaka Pro to join Kuuga's new Doutonbori Entertainment System promotion. In June, during the promotion's inaugural event, Miyawaki revealed that he had wrestled under the Orochi mask and made all subsequent appearances for the promotion unmasked and under his original ring name. On June 22, 2014, Miyawaki defeated Saburo Inematsu to win Kaientai Dojo's top singles title, the Strongest-K Championship, after Inematsu legitimately dislocated his left shoulder and was unable to continue the match. Initially, Miyawaki refused the title, but the Kaientai Dojo commission recognized him as the official champion on June 25. He lost the title to Kengo Mashimo in his second defense on August 24.

== Championships and accomplishments ==
- Doutonbori Pro Wrestling
  - WDW Tag Team Championship (1 time) – with Hub
  - WDW Six Man Tag Team Championship (1 time) – with Yuto Kikuchi and Violence Dragon
- DDT Pro-Wrestling
  - Ironman Heavymetalweight Championship (2 times)
- Kaientai Dojo
  - Strongest-K Championship (1 time)
  - Strongest-K Tag Team Championship (2 times) – with Yoshiya (1) and Kazma (1)
  - K-Survivor Tournament (2003) – with Kengo Mashimo, Kunio Toshima, Mike Lee Jr., Super-X and Yuu Yamagata
- Osaka Pro Wrestling
  - Independent World Junior Heavyweight Championship (1 time)
  - Osaka Pro Wrestling Owarai Championship (1 time)
  - Osaka Pro Wrestling Tag Team Championship (2 times) – with Kuuga (1) and Tadasuke (1)
