= Osaka Tag Team Championship =

Professional wrestling tag team championship

Osaka Pro Wrestling Tag Team Championship

Details
- Promotion: Osaka Pro Wrestling
- Date established: 2001
- Current champions: Rogue Nation (Shu Asakawa and Toru)
- Date won: July 20, 2026

Other name
- Osaka Tag Team Championship (2019–2023)
Statistics
- First champions: Daio Quällt and Gamma
- Most reigns: As tag team (3 reigns): Sengoku (Hideyoshi and Masamune); Momo no Seishun Tag (Atsushi Kotoge and Daisuke Harada); Takosupa (Takoyakida and Ultimate Spider Jr.); As individual (7 reigns): Black Buffalo
- Longest reign: Gaina and Hub (1,240 days)
- Shortest reign: Momo no Seishun Tag (Atsushi Kotoge and Daisuke Harada) (27 days)

The Osaka Pro Wrestling Tag Team Championship (大阪プロレスタッグ王座, Ōsaka Puroresu Taggu Ōza) is the top tag team title in the Japanese professional wrestling promotion Osaka Pro Wrestling. The title was established in 2001 when Daio Quällt and Gamma won a seven-team round-robin tournament to win the inaugural titles.

Being a professional wrestling championship, it is not won via direct competition; it is instead won via a predetermined ending to a match or awarded to a wrestler because of a wrestling angle. The current champions are Shu Asakawa and Toru who are in their first reign as a team.

== Title history ==
=== Names ===
Name	Years
Osaka Pro Wrestling Tag Team Championship	May 19, 2001 – January 18, 2019; February 2023 – present
Osaka Tag Team Championship	January 18, 2019 – February 2023

=== Reigns ===
As of September 19, 2026, there have been 47 reigns by 36 teams among 43 individual wrestlers. The current champions are Rogue Nation (Golitah and Shu Asakawa), who are in their first reign as a team.

Key
No.	Overall reign number
Reign	Reign number for the specific team—reign numbers for the individuals are in parentheses, if different
Days	Number of days held
Defenses	Number of successful defenses
+	Current reign is changing daily

No.	Champion	Championship change			Reign statistics			Notes	Ref.
No.	Champion	Date	Event	Location	Reign	Days	Defenses	Notes	Ref.
Osaka Pro Wrestling (OPW)
1	Daio Quällt and Gamma	May 19, 2001	Osaka Pro 2nd Anniversary Spicy Series 2001	Osaka, Japan	1	42	0	Defeated Super Delfin and Takehiro Murahama in the 2001 Osaka Tag Festival tournament final to become the inaugural champions.	
—	Vacated	June 30, 2001	—	—	—	—	—	Titles vacated due to Daio Quällt suffering an injury.	
2	Infinity (Black Buffalo and Tsubasa)	July 21, 2001	Osaka Pro Story #4	Osaka, Japan	1	34	0	Defeated Super Delfin and Takehiro Murahama to win the vacant titles.	
3	Takehiro Murahama and Kaiju Zeta Mandora	August 24, 2001	Osaka Pro Story #5	Osaka, Japan	1	92	0		
4	Miracle Man and Azteca	November 24, 2001	Saturday Night Story	Osaka, Japan	1	40	0		
5	Daio Quällt and "Big Boss" Ma-G-Ma	January 3, 2002	Osaka Pro Story #8	Osaka, Japan	1 (2, 2)	234	2	"Big Boss" Ma-G-Ma previously held the title under the name Kaiju Zeta Mandora.	
6	Infinity (Black Buffalo and Tsubasa)	August 25, 2002	Osaka Pro Story #13	Osaka, Japan	2	160	1		
7	Jushin Thunder Liger and Takehiro Murahama	February 1, 2003	Osaka Hurricane 03.02.01	Osaka, Japan	1 (1, 2)	308	5		
8	Universal Global Members (Billyken Kid and Tigers Mask)	December 6, 2003	Saturday Night Story	Osaka, Japan	1	379	4		
9	Daio Quällt and Black Buffalo	December 19, 2004	Osaka Pro Story #27	Osaka, Japan	1 (3, 3)	56	0		
10	Billyken Kid and Perro	February 13, 2005	Osaka Hurricane 2005	Osaka, Japan	1 (2, 1)	55	1		
—	Vacated	April 9, 2005	—	—	—	—	—	Titles vacated immediately after the first defense.	
11	Sengoku (Hideyoshi and Masamune)	July 23, 2005	Osaka Pro Story #28	Osaka, Japan	1	56	0	Defeated Super Delfin and Tigers Mask in the Osaka Tag Festival 2005 tournament final to win the vacant titles.	
12	Tsubasa and Billyken Kid	September 17, 2005	Osaka Pro Story #29	Osaka, Japan	1 (3, 3)	36	1		
—	Vacated	October 23, 2005	—	—	—	—	—	Tsubasa and Billyken Kid vacated the titles for the Tenpozan 2005 tournament.	
13	Billyken Kid and Black Buffalo	February 26, 2006	Osaka Hurricane 2006	Osaka, Japan	1 (4, 4)	153	0		
—	Vacated	July 29, 2006	—	Osaka, Japan	—	—	—	Vacated after Buffalo suffered a legitimate shoulder injury.	
14	Billyken Kid and Hideyoshi	August 5, 2006	Saturday Night Story	Osaka, Japan	1 (5, 2)	119	1	Defeated the teams of Gaina and Super Delfin, and Flash Moon and Tigers Mask in a three-way elimination tag team match to win the vacant titles.	
15	Bad Force (Gaina and Zeus)	December 2, 2006	Saturday Night Story	Osaka, Japan	1	72	0		
16	Sengoku (Hideyoshi and Masamune)	February 12, 2007	Osaka Hurricane 2007	Osaka, Japan	2 (3, 2)	195	1	This was a three-way elimination tag team match also involving Flash Moon and Tsubasa.	
17	Kagetora and Rasse	August 26, 2007	Pro-Wrestling Summit in Ariake	Tokyo, Japan	1	111	1	This was an interpromotional Winner-takes-All match where Kagetora and Rasse's Tohoku Tag Team Championship was also on the line.	
18	Zero and Gaina	December 15, 2007	Michinoku Pro National Tour 2007	Anan, Japan	1 (1, 2)	316	5	This was a Michinoku Pro Wrestling event.	
19	Mucha Lucha (Asian Cougar and Tsubasa)	October 26, 2008	Osaka Pro Story #44	Osaka, Japan	1 (1, 4)	67	0		
20	Tigers Mask and Black Buffalo	January 1, 2009	New Year Holiday Paradise	Osaka, Japan	1 (2, 5)	45	0		
21	Mucha Lucha (The Great Sasuke and Asian Cougar)	February 15, 2009	Osaka Hurricane 2009	Osaka, Japan	1 (1, 2)	94	0		
22	Tigers Mask and Black Buffalo	May 20, 2009	Osaka Pro 10th Anniversary Show	Tokyo, Japan	2 (3, 6)	59	0		
23	Sengoku (Hideyoshi and Masamune)	July 18, 2009	Saturday Night Story	Osaka, Japan	3 (4, 3)	208	4		
24	Momo no Seishun Tag (Atsushi Kotoge and Daisuke Harada)	February 11, 2010	Osaka Hurricane 2010	Osaka, Japan	1	156	2		
25	Don Fujii and Masaaki Mochizuki	July 17, 2010	Summer Achoo Series	Osaka, Japan	1	106	1		
26	Momo no Seishun Tag (Atsushi Kotoge and Daisuke Harada)	October 31, 2010	Battle Autumn 2010	Osaka, Japan	2	27	0		
27	Joker (Kuuga and Orochi)	November 27, 2010	Winter Starts Series	Osaka, Japan	1 (3, 1)	77	1	Kuuga previously held the title under the name Asian Cougar.	
28	The Big Guns (Zeus and The Bodyguard)	February 12, 2011	Gerende ga Tokeruhodo Koishitai Series	Osaka, Japan	1 (2, 1)	35	1		
29	Joker (Tadasuke and Orochi)	March 19, 2011	Spring Samba Series	Osaka, Japan	1 (1, 2)	121	0	This was a three-way elimination tag team match also involving The Big Guns.	
30	Momo no Seishun Tag (Atsushi Kotoge and Daisuke Harada)	July 18, 2011	Summer Achoo Series 2011	Osaka, Japan	3	104	2	This was a three-way elimination tag team match also involving Takoyakida and Ultimate Spider Jr.	
31	Joker (Hayata and Kuuga)	October 30, 2011	Saturday Night Story	Osaka, Japan	1 (1, 4)	238	2		
—	Vacated	June 24, 2012	Osaka Tag Festival 2012 Final!	Osaka, Japan	—	—	—	Hayata and Tadasuke defeated their fellow Joker stablemates Kuuga and Ultimate Spider Jr. in the finals of the 2012 Osaka Tag Festival. Subsequently, they announced their departure from the stable and vacated the titles.	
32	Glare (Hayata and Tadasuke)	July 22, 2012	Osaka Hurricane 2012	Osaka, Japan	1 (2, 2)	251	2	Defeated The Big Guns and Sengoku (Hideyoshi and Masamune) in a three-way tag team match to win the vacant titles.	
—	Vacated	March 30, 2013	—	Osaka, Japan	—	—	—	The titles were declared vacated after Hayata announced his contract with the promotion was running out on April 29.	
33	Bad Stream (Kazuaki Mihara and Tadasuke)	May 19, 2013	Osaka Holiday Paradise	Osaka, Japan	1 (1, 3)	161	3	Defeated The Big Guns to win the vacant titles.	
34	The Big Guns (Zeus and The Bodyguard)	October 27, 2013	Osaka Tornado Vol. 2	Osaka, Japan	2 (3, 2)	175	1		
—	Vacated	April 20, 2014	—	Osaka, Japan	—	—	—	Titles were declared vacated after Zeus and The Bodyguard left Osaka Pro Wrestling for All Japan Pro Wrestling.	
35	Caramel Boy and Kaiju New World	May 6, 2017	Osaka Pro Wrestling 18th Anniversary Show	Osaka, Japan	1	155	1	Defeated Hub and Okonomiyakida in the final of the Osaka Tag Festival tournament to win the vacant titles.	
36	Takosupa (Takoyakida and Ultimate Spider Jr.)	October 8, 2017	It's Osaka Pro Everyone Gather!	Osaka, Japan	1	463	2		
37	Infinity (Black Buffalo and Tsubasa)	January 14, 2019	Road To 20th Anniversary	Osaka, Japan	3 (7, 5)	76	0	The title was renamed Osaka Tag Team Championship during this reign.	
38	Magnitude Kishiwada and Takashi Yoshida	March 31, 2019	Declaration of Flowering 2019	Osaka, Japan	1 (3, 1)	31	0	Magnitude Kishiwada previously held the title under the names Kaiju Zeta Mandora and "Big Boss" Ma-G-Ma.	
39	Gamma and Super Delfin	May 1, 2019	Osaka Pro 20th Anniversary Show	Osaka, Japan	1 (2, 1)	39	0		
40	Rising Hayato and Santaro Ishizuchi	June 9, 2019	Ehime Pro Wrestling 3rd Anniversary	Matsuyama, Japan	1	83	0	This was an Ehime Pro Wrestling event.	
41	Gamma and Super Shisa	August 31, 2019	Summer Festival 2019	Osaka, Japan	1 (3, 1)	119	1		
42	Hub and Gaina	December 28, 2019	Osaka Pro Has Come to Noha Hanshin	Osaka, Japan	2 (2, 3)	1,240	1	Hub previously held the title under the name Zero.	
43	Takosupa (Takoyakida and Ultimate Spider Jr.)	May 21, 2023	Osaka Castle Festival	Osaka, Japan	2	203	2		
44	Rogue Nation (Goliath and Toru)	May 21, 2023	Excalibur	Osaka, Japan	1	196	1		
45	Tsubasa and Billyken Kid	June 23, 2024	Osaka Castle Festival	Osaka, Japan	2 (6, 6)	126	1		
46	Rogue Nation (Shu Asakawa and Yasutaka Oosera)	October 27, 2024	Osaka Pro Autumn Festival 2024	Osaka, Japan	1	63	0		
47	Quiet Storm and Shigehiro Irie	December 29, 2024	Osaka Pro Excalibur 2024	Osaka, Japan	1	168	1		
48	Rogue Nation (Goliath and Shu Asakawa)	June 15, 2025	Osaka Pro Castle Festival 2025	Osaka, Japan	1 (2, 2)	175	1		
49	Aran Sano and Tigers Mask	December 7, 2025	Osaka Pro Excalibur 2025	Osaka, Japan	1 (1, 4)	182	2		
50	Takosupa (Takoyakida and Ultimate Spider Jr.)	June 7, 2026	Osaka Pro Ultimate Spider Jr. 20th Anniversary & Takoyakida 21st Anniversary	Osaka, Japan	3	43	0		
51	Rogue Nation (Shu Asakawa and Toru)	July 20, 2026	Osaka Pro Osaka Castle Town Festival 2026	Osaka, Japan	1 (3, 2)	61+	0		

== Combined reigns ==
†	Indicates the current champion

=== By team ===
Rank	Team	No. of reigns	Combined defenses	Combined days
1	Zero/Hub and Gaina	2	6	1,556
2	Takosupa (Takoyakida and Ultimate Spider Jr.)	3	4	709
3	Sengoku (Hideyoshi and Masamune)	3	5	459
4	Billyken Kid and Tigers Mask	1	4	379
5	Jushin Thunder Liger and Takehiro Murahama	1	5	308
6	Momo no Seishun Tag (Atsushi Kotoge and Daisuke Harada)	3	4	287
7	Infinity (Black Buffalo and Tsubasa)	3	1	270
8	Glare (Hayata and Tadasuke)	1	2	251
9	Joker (Hayata and Kuuga)	1	2	238
10	Daio Quällt and "Big Boss" MA-G-MA	1	2	234
11	The Big Guns (Zeus and The Bodyguard)	2	2	210
12	Rogue Nation (Goliath and Toru)	1	1	196
13	Aran Sano and Tigers Mask	1	2	182
14	Rogue Nation (Goliath and Shu Asakawa)	1	1	175
15	Quiet Storm and Shigehiro Irie	1	1	168
16	Tsubasa and Billyken Kid	2	2	162
17	Bad Stream (Kazuaki Mihara and Tadasuke)	1	3	161
18	Caramel Boy and Kaiju New World	1	1	155
19	Billyken Kid and Black Buffalo	1	0	153
20	Joker (Tadasuke and Orochi)	1	0	121
21	Billyken Kid and Hideyoshi	1	1	119
21	Gamma and Super Shisa	1	1	119
23	Kagetora and Rasse	1	1	111
24	Don Fujii and Masaaki Mochizuki	1	1	106
25	Tigers Mask and Black Buffalo	2	0	104
26	Mucha Lucha (The Great Sasuke and Asian Cougar)	1	0	94
27	Takehiro Murahama and Kaiju Zeta Mandora	1	0	92
28	Rising Hayato and Santaro Ishizuchi	1	0	83
29	Joker (Kuuga and Orochi)	1	1	77
30	Bad Force (Gaina and Zeus)	1	0	72
31	Mucha Lucha (Asian Cooger and Tsubasa)	1	0	67
32	Rogue Nation (Shu Asakawa and Yasutaka Oosera)	1	0	63
33	Daio Quällt and Black Buffalo	1	0	56
34	Billyken Kid and Perro	1	1	55
35	Rogue Nation † (Shu Asakawa and Toru)	1	0	61+
36	Daio Quällt and Gamma	1	0	42
37	Miracle Man and Azteca	1	0	40
38	Gamma and Super Delfin	1	0	39
39	Magnitude Kishiwada and Takashi Yoshida	1	0	31

=== By wrestler ===
Rank	Wrestler	No. of reigns	Combined defenses	Combined days
1	Gaina	3	6	1,628
2	Zero/Hub	2	6	1,556
3	Billyken Kid	6	8	868
4	Takoyakida	3	4	709
4	Ultimate Spider Jr.	3	4	709
6	Tigers Mask	4	6	665
7	Black Buffalo	7	1	583
8	Hideyoshi	4	6	578
9	Tadasuke	3	5	533
10	Tsubasa	6	3	499
11	Hayata	2	4	489
12	Asian Cougar/Kuuga	4	3	476
13	Masamune	3	5	459
14	Takehiro Murahama	2	5	400
15	Goliath	2	2	371
16	Magnitude Kishiwada	3 (Note: Won first two reigns under the names of Kaiju Zeta Mandora and "Big Boss" Ma-G-Ma.)	2	357
17	Daio Quällt	3	2	332
18	Jushin Thunder Liger	1	5	308
19	Shu Asakawa †	3	1	299+
20	Atsushi Kotoge	3	4	287
20	Daisuke Harada	3	4	287
22	Zeus	3	2	282
23	Toru †	2	1	257+
24	The Bodyguard	2	2	210
25	Gamma	3	1	200
26	Orochi	2	1	198
27	Aran Sano	1	2	182
28	Quiet Storm	1	1	168
28	Shigehiro Irie	1	1	168
30	Kazuaki Mihara	1	3	161
31	Caramel Boy	1	1	155
31	Kaiju New World	1	1	155
33	Super Shisa	1	1	119
34	Kagetora	1	1	111
34	Rasse	1	1	111
36	Don Fujii	1	1	106
36	Masaaki Mochizuki	1	1	106
38	The Great Sasuke	1	0	94
39	Rising Hayato	1	0	83
39	Santaro Ishizuchi	1	0	83
41	Yasutaka Oosera	1	0	63
42	Perro	1	1	55
43	Azteca	1	0	40
43	Miracle Man	1	0	40
45	Super Delfin	1	0	39
46	Takashi Yoshida	1	0	31
