= Black Buffalo (wrestler) =

Japanese professional wrestler

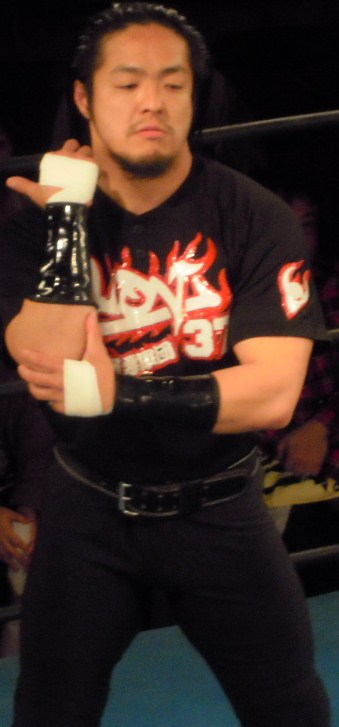
- Buffalo in April 2011

Personal information
- Born: Keisuke Yamada; July 6, 1974 (age 52) Tottori Prefecture

Professional wrestling career
- Ring name(s): Black Buffalo; Black Búfalo; Black Vampire Buffalo; Buffalo; Inaba no Buffalo; Keisuke Yamada; Mōgyūma; Mōgyūma Aratame Tawara Tōda; Orix Buffalo; Rojo del Sol; Tawara Tōda; Zombie
- Billed height: 1.76 m (5 ft 9 1/2 in)
- Billed weight: 86 kg (190 lb)
- Debut: August 2, 1993

Keisuke Yamada (山田 圭介, Yamada Keisuke; born July 6, 1974) is a Japanese professional wrestler, better known by the ring name Black Buffalo (ブラックバファロー, Burakku Bafarō). Originally starting his career in International Wrestling Association of Japan, where he worked under his real name, Yamada found a new home promotion in 1999 in Osaka Pro Wrestling, where he began wrestling under a mask and the ring name Black Buffalo. For most of his career in Osaka Pro, Yamada has portrayed a villainous character, having been a part of every major villainous alliance in the history of the promotion. During his first years in the promotion, Buffalo went on to become a four-time Tag Team Champion. In February 2008, Buffalo was forced to unmask and reveal his true identity, after losing a match, and afterwards began teaming with the man, who unmasked him, Tigers Mask, with two becoming two-time Osaka Pro Wrestling Tag Team Champions together. Finally, in March 2012, Buffalo managed to win Osaka Pro's top title, the Osaka Pro Wrestling Championship. Backstage, Yamada served as the vice president of Osaka Pro Wrestling. Yamada left Osaka Pro Wrestling after the promotion went through a corporate restructuring in April 2014, shortening his ring name to Buffalo (バッファロー, Baffarō).

== Professional wrestling career ==
=== Debut (1993) ===
Yamada made his professional wrestling debut on August 2, 1993, working under his real name for the Oriental Puroresu promotion. Shortly afterwards, he left the promotion to become a freelancer.

=== IWA Japan (1994–1999) ===
In 1994, Yamada joined the International Wrestling Association of Japan promotion. During his years in IWA Japan, Yamada had several high-profile matches with the likes of Cactus Jack, Terry Funk and Tiger Jeet Singh, and, at the end of his run, also served as the president of the promotion. He quit the promotion in 1999.

=== Osaka Pro Wrestling (1999–2014) ===
In April 1999, Yamada joined the Osaka Pro Wrestling promotion, where he began wrestling under a mask as Black Buffalo, a character inspired by the Osaka Kintetsu Buffaloes baseball team. He made his debut for the promotion at its first event on April 29, where he, Dick Togo and Violencia, forming the villainous alliance Legion of Violence (LOV), were defeated in a six-man tag team main event by Masato Yakushiji, Naohiro Hoshikawa and Super Delfin. Buffalo kept teaming with Togo for the rest of the year. On November 21, Buffalo won his first title in Osaka Pro, when he defeated Super Delfin for the UWF Super Welterweight Championship, only to lose it back to him seven days later. In early 2000, LOV was joined by Daio Quallt and Policeme~n, replacing Violencia. On May 1, Buffalo and Togo defeated Super Delfin and Super Demekin in the finals to win the 1st Anniversary Tag Tournament. In September, Buffalo took part in the inaugural Tenno-zan tournament, where he made it to the semifinals, before being eliminated by Super Delfin. After Dick Togo left Osaka Pro at the end of 2000, LOV was disbanded and replaced by the new group, FLUXxx, as a member of which Buffalo formed a new tag team named Infinity with Tsubasa. After reaching the semifinals of the 2001 Osaka Tag Festival, Buffalo and Tsubasa defeated Super Delfin and Takehiro Murahama on July 21 to win the vacant Osaka Pro Wrestling Tag Team Championship. They would lose the title to Murahama and Kaiju Zeta Mandora on August 24. The following October's Tenno-zan saw a repeat of the previous year's tournament as Buffalo was eliminated in the semifinals by Super Delfin. On January 27, 2002, Buffalo, Tsubasa and Gamma defeated Super Delfin, Super Demekin and Takehiro Murahama to win the Trios Cup Tournament. On August 25, Buffalo and Tsubasa regained the Osaka Pro Wrestling Tag Team Championship by defeating the Kishiwada Gurentai (Big Boss MA-G-MA and Daio Quallt). After a five-month reign, they would lose the title to Jyushin Thunder Liger and Takehiro Murahama on February 1, 2003.

After Buffalo and Tsubasa failed to regain the title from Liger and Murahama on August 13, Buffalo turned on Tsubasa on November 15 and jumped to Big Boss MA-G-MA's Kishiwada Gurentai stable. Buffalo and Tsubasa had their big grudge match against each other on May 29, 2004, ending with Buffalo picking up the win. On December 19, Buffalo and Daio Quallt defeated Billyken Kid and Tigers Mask to win the Osaka Pro Wrestling Tag Team Championship. Their reign would last until February 13, 2005, when they were defeated by Billyken Kid and Perro. On April 29, Buffalo and Tsubasa reformed Infinity for one night, when they defeated Kageki Pro representatives Aztec and Kaze in a special interpromotional tag team match. After the Kishiwasa Gurentai was disbanded in the aftermath of Big Boss MA-G-MA leaving Osaka Pro, Buffalo, Hideyoshi, Masamune and Toru Owashi formed the promotion's new top villainous alliance, Buraikan, on June 25. In November, Buffalo made it to the semifinals of the Tenno-zan for the third time, but was there once again defeated by Super Delfin. On January 28, 2006, longtime babyface Billyken Kid shocked Osaka Pro by turning on Tigers Mask and the Osaka Pro Seikigun ("regular army") and taking over Buraikan, which was then renamed Vendaval, with Buffalo becoming his second-in-command. On February 26, Buffalo and BKK defeated Flash Moon and Tigers Mask to win the Osaka Pro Wrestling Tag Team Championship. The two teams faced each other in a rematch on June 3 in the finals of the 2006 Tag Festival, which was won by Flash Moon and Tigers Mask. On July 15, Buffalo added another title to his résumé, when he defeated ten other men to win the Osaka Pro Wrestling Battle Royal Championship. However, on July 29, Osaka Pro announced that Buffalo had suffered a rotator cuff tear in his right shoulder and stripped him of both the Osaka Pro Wrestling Tag Team and the Osaka Pro Wrestling Battle Royal Championship.

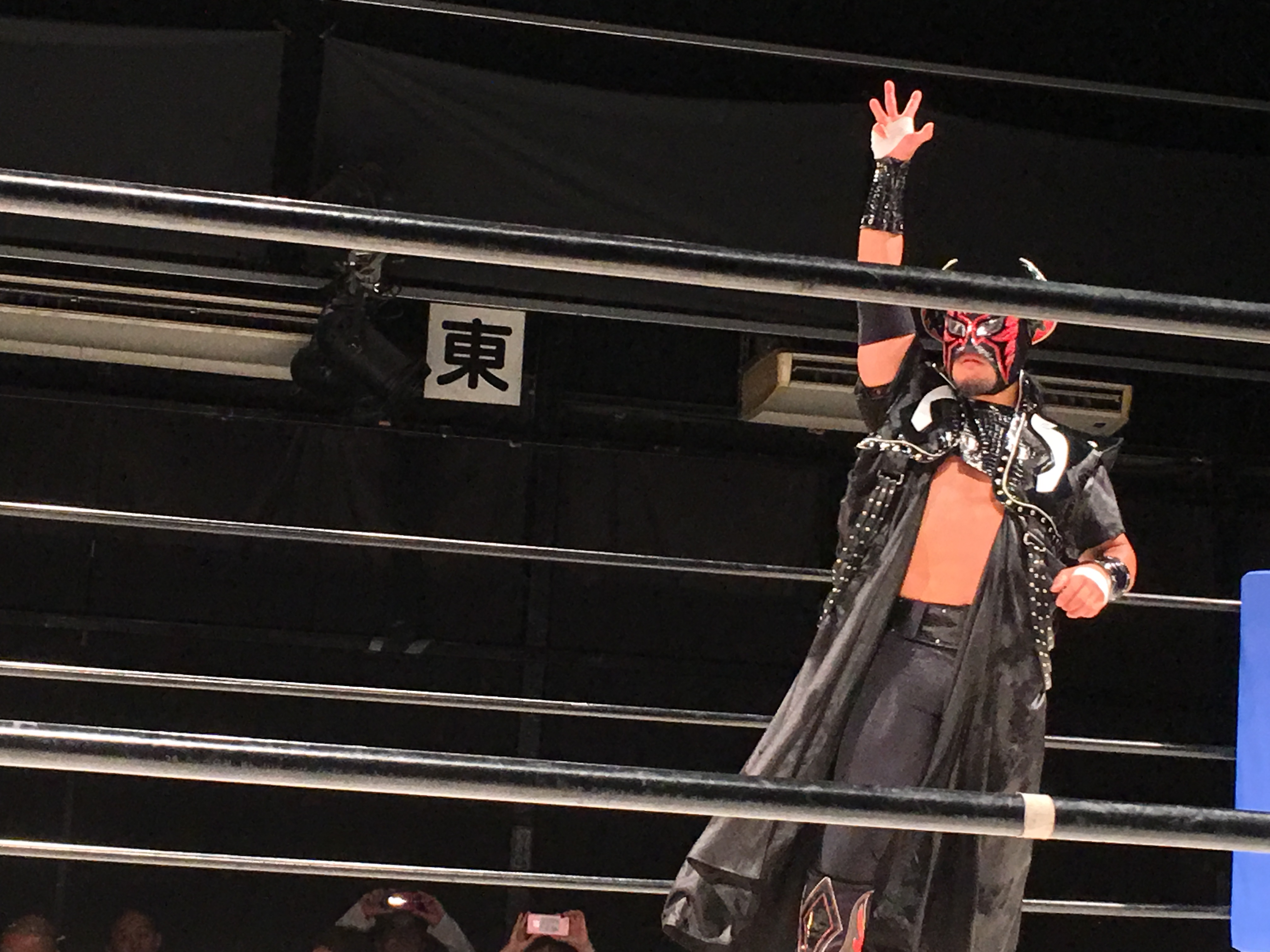
Buffalo wearing his mask

After remaining inactive for the rest of 2006, Buffalo showed up in Mexico in early 2007, making his debut for AAA on February 16 as a member of La Legión Extranjera, a villainous stable of foreigners. During his stay in Mexico, Buffalo teamed with Rossy Moreno to unsuccessfully challenge Cynthia Moreno and El Oriental for the AAA World Mixed Tag Team Championship on March 23. After spending almost a year away from Osaka Pro, Buffalo made a surprise return to the promotion on June 30, 2007, by attacking Kuishinbo Kamen and Miracle Man, revealing himself as Bad Force leader Gaina's partner in the 2007 Tag Festival. After defeating Miracle Man and Kuishinbo Kamen in less than a minute, Buffalo and Gaina picked up their second win of the night by defeating Atsushi Kotoge and Daisuke Harada in the following match. After defeating Asian Cougar and Tsubasa in their semifinal match on July 8, Buffalo and Gaina advanced to the finals of the Tag Festival, where, on July 14, they were defeated by Tigers Mask and Billyken Kid, who had rejoined the Osaka Pro Seikigun during Buffalo's time away from the promotion. On August 25, Buffalo unsuccessfully challenged Tigers Mask for the Osaka Pro Wrestling Championship. Buffalo kept teaming with Bad Force for the rest of the year, pinning Tigers Mask in a non-title match on October 8. On December 8, Buffalo pinned Tigers Mask again, this time in a Captain's Fall tag team match, and afterwards challenged him to a match for the Osaka Pro Wrestling Championship. On December 22, the two men agreed to the match with the added stipulation, that the loser of the match would also be unmasked. On February 11, 2008, Black Buffalo and Tigers Mask faced each other in a Mask vs. Mask match for the Osaka Pro Wrestling Championship in the main event of Osaka Pro's biggest annual event, Osaka Hurricane. After being pinned by Tigers Mask for the win, Buffalo was forced to unmask and reveal himself as Keisuke Yamada of IWA Japan. In an out-of-character post-match speech, Yamada revealed that the real reason he had spent a year away from Osaka Pro was that he had been battling depression and alcoholism, which he had managed to overcome with Tigers Mask's support. Buffalo was then kicked out of Bad Force, which led to Tigers Mask inviting him to join the Osaka Pro Seikigun. After spending some time away from Osaka Pro, Buffalo returned to the promotion on March 29, accepting Tigers Mask's invitation. Despite being unmasked, Yamada continued performing under the Black Buffalo ring name.

In October 2008, the Osaka Pro Seikigun was broken into two camps following problems between Billyken Kid and Tigers Mask, which eventually led to Tigers Mask, Black Buffalo and Masamune breaking away from the group and forming a new villainous alliance, unofficially referred to as the "Rudo Army". On November 15, Buffalo and Tigers Mask defeated Atsushi Kotoge and Daisuke Harada, with help from the debuting Orochi, to become the interim Osaka Pro Wrestling Tag Team Champions. Osaka Pro had been forced to introduce the title, after one half of the reigning Osaka Pro Wrestling Tag Team Champions, Asian Cougar, had been injured at the hands of the Rudo Army. In December, Buffalo made it to the finals of the 2008 Tenno-zan tournament, before being defeated by Billyken Kid. On January 1, 2009, Buffalo and Tigers Mask defeated Mucha Lucha (Asian Cougar and Tsubasa) in a title unification match to become the new Osaka Pro Wrestling Tag Team Champions. They would lose the title to Asian Cougar and Great Sasuke on February 15 at Osaka Hurricane 2009, only to regain it on May 20 at Osaka Pro's tenth anniversary event. The team's second and Buffalo's sixth reign ended on July 18, when they were defeated by Sengoku (Hideyoshi and Masamune). During the summer, Yamada returned to IWA Japan, now working as Black Buffalo, for a short run as the IWA World Heavyweight Champion. Back in Osaka Pro, Buffalo's and Tigers Mask's stable, which now also included The Bodyguard, Orochi and Tadasuke, was officially named LOV in reference to Osaka Pro's original villainous alliance. In January 2009, LOV, still villains within Osaka Pro, became de facto babyfaces by starting an interpromotional storyline rivalry with the Dragon Gate promotion, starting on January 17, when Black Buffalo and Tigers Mask invaded a Dragon Gate event and attacked Cima, who had publicly been making disparaging remarks about Osaka Pro. The rivalry was mainly contested between Cima and Tigers Mask; Black Buffalo's participation culminated on July 11, when he, Tigers Mask and The Bodyguard unsuccessfully challenged Cima, Gamma and Genki Horiguchi for the Open the Triangle Gate Championship. LOV's babyface turn would be finalized on August 28, when Orochi turned on the stable, helping Asian Cougar defeat Tigers Mask for the Osaka Pro Wrestling Championship. The newly renamed Kuuga, Orochi and another LOV turncoat, The Bodyguard, would then form the Joker stable, which took over LOV's spot as the promotion's top villainous alliance. On January 29, 2011, Buffalo and Tigers Mask challenged Kuuga and Orochi for the Osaka Pro Wrestling Tag Team Championship, but were defeated, when Tadasuke also turned on them and jumped to Joker. On February 27, Buffalo was forced to join Joker, after he and Tigers Mask were defeated in a tag team match by Orochi and Tadasuke. Meanwhile, Tigers Mask kept LOV alive by recruiting Naoki Setoguchi as his new partner. On March 5, Buffalo defeated Tigers Mask in a singles match, following interference from members of Joker. After refusing to return to his villainous antics, Buffalo turned on Joker on March 13 and returned to LOV. After LOV picked up two big wins over Joker, first on April 10, when Buffalo, Tigers Mask and Naoki Setoguchi defeated Kuuga, Tadasuke and Hayata to win the 12th Anniversary Six Man Tag Team Tournament, and then, when Tigers Mask regained the Osaka Pro Wrestling Championship from Kuuga on April 29, Tigers Mask suddenly announced that he was disbanding LOV and rejoining the Osaka Pro Seikigun, along with Buffalo and Setoguchi. In June, Buffalo and Tigers Mask entered the 2011 Tag Festival. After two wins and one loss, they advanced to the finals, where, on June 26, they defeated Billyken Kid and Joker leader Kuuga to win the tournament.

After a disappointing 2011 Tenno-zan, where Buffalo was eliminated in the first round by American Chikara representative Jigsaw, his 2012 started with him defeating seven other men, including Tigers Mask, in a gauntlet match on February 26, to become the number one contender to new Osaka Pro Wrestling Champion, Daisuke Harada. On March 25, Buffalo defeated Harada to win the Osaka Pro Wrestling Championship for the first time in his thirteenth year in the promotion. Buffalo made his first successful title defense on May 26, defeating Joker member Spider J. On July 22, Buffalo main evented his second Hurricane event, in which he lost the Osaka Pro Wrestling Championship back to Daisuke Harada, ending his reign at 119 days. On November 3, Buffalo teamed with Tigers Mask to unsuccessfully challenge Harada's Glare stablemates Hayata and Tadasuke for the Osaka Pro Wrestling Tag Team Championship. On January 19, 2013, Buffalo teamed with fellow Osaka Pro Seikigun members Kazuaki Mihara and Naoki Setoguchi in a six-man tag team main event, where they were defeated by Glare. After the match, Glare leader Daisuke Harada revealed that he had recruited a new member to his stable, someone who agreed with his idea of changing Osaka Pro. He then revealed Black Buffalo as his newest ally, much to the dismay of the Osaka Pro Seikigun, especially Tigers Mask. On January 26, Buffalo, Harada, Hayata and Tadasuke defeated Billyken Kid, Kazuaki Mihara, Naoki Setoguchi and Tigers Mask in an eight-man tag team main event, with Buffalo submitting Tigers Mask for the win. After the match, he challenged the Osaka Pro Seikigun to an elimination match, where the losing team would be forced to disband. After Buffalo and Tigers Mask had eliminated each other from the match on February 24, Harada pinned Billyken Kid for the final elimination, saving Glare and forcing Seikigun to disband. On March 2, Billyken Kid and Kazuaki Mihara joined Glare, announcing they now agreed with the stable's "revolution". Glare then declared war on Joker and Unique Gundan, the two remaining stables in Osaka Pro. The following major Osaka Pro event on March 24 saw former rivals, Tigers Mask and Joker's Orochi, come together to defeat Buffalo and Billyken Kid in a grudge tag team match. The following month, Glare was disbanded, when Daisuke Harada and Hayata quit Osaka Pro. From May 26 to June 23, Buffalo and Billyken Kid took part in the 2013 Osaka Tag Festival, making it to the final day with a chance of winning the tournament, however, a loss against the reigning Osaka Pro Wrestling Tag Team Champions, former Glare stablemates Kazuaki Mihara and Tadasuke, meant that they dropped behind the Big Guns (The Bodyguard and Zeus) in the final standings. On July 18, Buffalo made his debut for the Pro Wrestling Noah promotion in his home prefecture of Tottori, losing to Maybach Taniguchi in a singles match. The following day, he pinned Hitoshi Kumano in a tag team match, where he and Gastón Mateo faced Kumano and Pesadilla. On August 10, Buffalo and nine other wrestlers revived the Osaka Pro Seikigun in order to battle the new Bad Stream stable. The first big battle between the Seikigun and Bad Stream took place on August 25, when Buffalo, The Bodyguard, Naoki Setoguchi and Zeus defeated Kazuaki Mihara, Mikey Broderick, Quiet Storm and Tadasuke in a four-on-four elimination tag team match. On September 15, Buffalo unsuccessfully challenged Bad Stream leader Quiet Storm for the Osaka Pro Wrestling Championship.

On March 1, 2014, Black Buffalo, as the vice president of Osaka Pro Wrestling, announced that the promotion would be folding due to financial difficulties on April 20 with all of its workers becoming freelancers. It was later announced that Osaka Pro Wrestling would continue under new management. On April 20, Buffalo wrestled his final match as an Osaka Pro Wrestling affiliated worker, teaming with Billyken Kid and Bull Armor Takuya in a six-man tag team match, where they were defeated by The Bodyguard, Quiet Storm and Zeus.

=== Freelancing and Makai (2014–present) ===
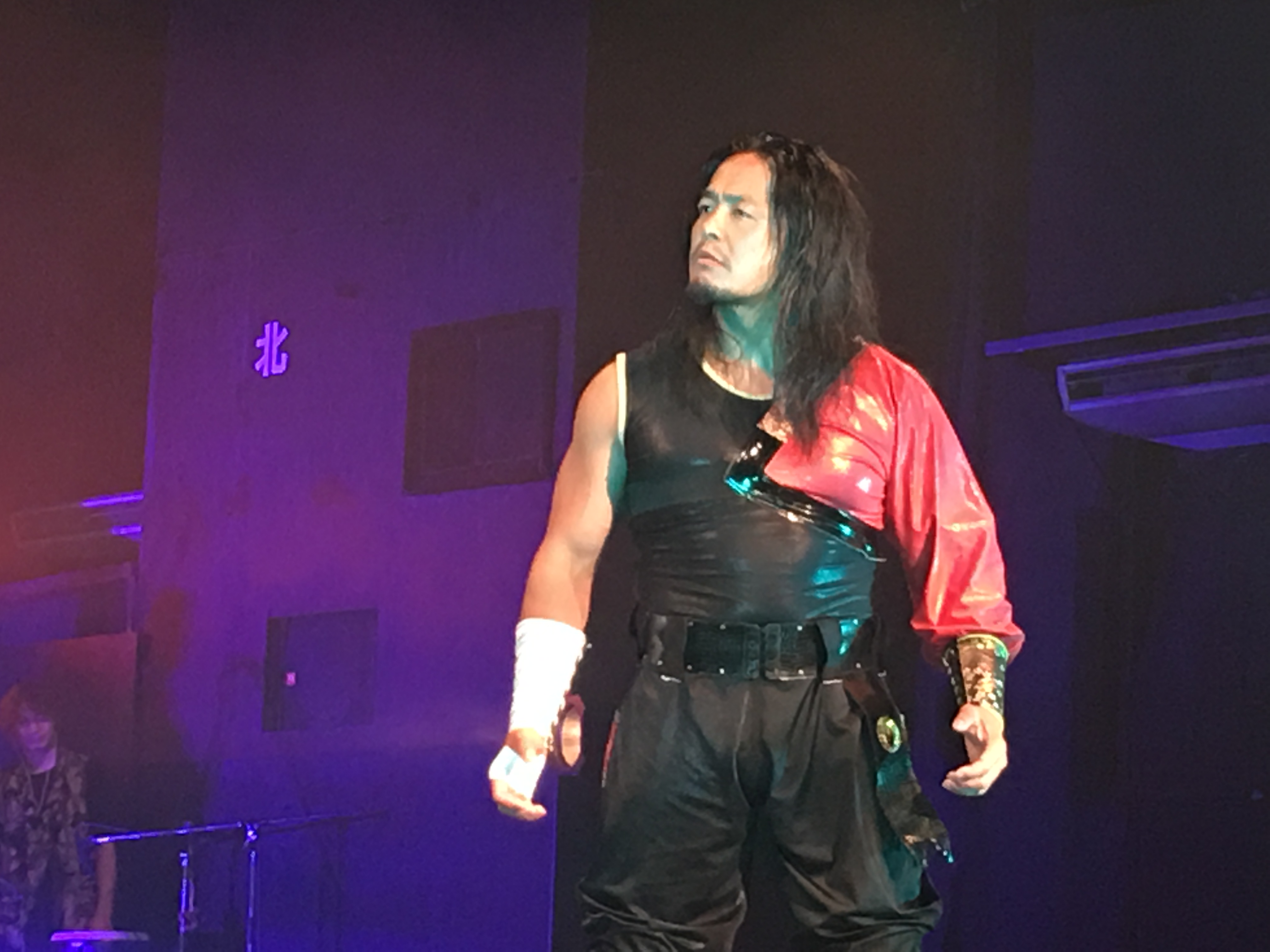
Buffalo in August 2016

On April 22, 2014, Yamada announced that in the future he would be working under a new mask with the shortened ring name Buffalo. Yamada also started working for the Tottori Darazu Puroresu promotion under the ring name Inaba no Buffalo ("Buffalo of Inaba"). On September 10, Buffalo returned to Pro Wrestling Noah to take part in an Osaka Pro Wrestling alumni tag team match, where he and Atsushi Maruyama, the former Tigers Mask, were defeated by Daisuke Harada and Quiet Storm. On February 16, 2015, Buffalo put his mask on the line in a VKF Championship match against Yoshiaki Yago. Buffalo won the match, retaining his mask and becoming the new champion. On February 28, Buffalo and Tsubasa, the reformed Infinity tag team, defeated Hayata and Tadasuke to capture the Dove-Pro Wrestling Tag Team Championship. On March 23, Buffalo and Yuya Susumu defeated Gentaro and Kenichiro Arai to win Pro Wrestling Freedoms' King of Freedom World Tag Team Championship. They lost the title to Kamui and Mammoth Sasaki on May 1. On June 7, Buffalo made his debut for Wrestle-1, teaming with Jay Freddie in a tag team match, where they were defeated by Seiki Yoshioka and Yasufumi Nakanoue. In December, Buffalo started working for women's wrestling promotion Reina Joshi Puroresu as a member of Syuri's Narcissist-gun stable. By 2017, Buffalo had ended his freelancing days by signing with the Makai company, which presents shows combining music, theater and wrestling.

== Championships and accomplishments ==
- Dove Pro-Wrestling
  - Dove Tag Team Championship (1 time) – with Tsubasa
  - Dove Pro Tag Team Title Tournament (2014-2015) – with Tsubasa
- Dramatic Dream Team/DDT Pro-Wrestling
  - Ironman Heavymetalweight Championship (4 times)
  - Itabashi Singles Tournament (1999)
- International Wrestling Association of Japan
  - IWA World Heavyweight Championship (1 time)
- Osaka Pro Wrestling
  - Interim Osaka Pro Wrestling Tag Team Championship (1 time) – with Tigers Mask
  - Osaka Pro Wrestling Championship (1 time)
  - Osaka Pro Wrestling Battle Royal Championship (1 time)
  - Osaka Pro Wrestling Tag Team Championship (6 times) – with Tsubasa (2), Daio Quallt (1), Billyken Kid (1), and Tigers Mask (2)
  - UWF Super Welterweight Championship (1 time)
  - 1st Anniversary Tag Tournament (2000) – with Dick Togo
  - Osaka Mixed Pancake Tournament (2002) – with Tsubasa and Tsubasa Kuragaki
  - Osaka Pro Wrestling 12th Anniversary Six Man Tag Team Tournament (2011) – with Naoki Setoguchi and Tigers Mask
  - Osaka Tag Festival (2011) – with Tigers Mask
  - Trios Cup Tournament (2002) – Gamma and Tsubasa
- Pro Wrestling Freedoms
  - King of Freedom World Tag Team Championship (1 time) – with Yuya Susumu
- Pro Wrestling Illustrated
  - PWI ranked him #213 of the 500 best singles wrestlers in the PWI 500 in 2002
- VKF Puroresu
  - VKF Championship (1 time)

=== Luchas de Apuestas record ===
Winner (wager)	Loser (wager)	Location	Event	Date	Notes
Tigers Mask (mask)	Black Buffalo (mask)	Osaka, Osaka, Japan	Osaka Hurricane 2008	February 11, 2008	
Buffalo (mask)	Yoshiaki Yago (VKF Championship)	Tokyo, Japan	Monday Night Brawl	February 16, 2015	
