= Mitsuhiro Matsunaga =

Japanese retired professional wrestler (born 1966)

Personal information
- Born: Mitsuhiro Matsunaga; March 24, 1966 (age 60) Chita, Aichi, Japan

Professional wrestling career
- Ring name: Mitsuhiro Matsunaga
- Billed height: 5 ft 11 in (1.80 m)
- Billed weight: 231 lb (105 kg)
- Billed from: Chita, Aichi, Japan
- Trained by: Masashi Aoyagi
- Debut: October 6, 1989
- Retired: December 23, 2009

Mitsuhiro Matsunaga (松永 光広, Matsunaga Mitsuhiro; born March 24, 1966) is a Japanese retired professional wrestler best known for his deathmatch wrestling style, having competed in memorable deathmatches in Big Japan Pro Wrestling (BJW), Frontier Martial-Arts Wrestling (FMW) and Wrestling International New Generations (W*ING). He is renowned for participating in the first-ever deathmatch in Japanese wrestling history on December 10, 1989 and is also credited for participating in a Piranha Deathmatch against Kendo Nagasaki on August 19, 1996, which has been considered to be the most popular and greatest deathmatch in Japanese wrestling history by wrestling journalists and many sports websites and Matsunaga has received critical acclaim for his performance.

Matsunaga began his career in FMW where he specialized in the deathmatch wrestling style and adopted it as his own trademark style. He competed in many infamous deathmatches in W*ING and high-profile feuds with Mr. Pogo, Freddy Krueger and Leatherface in many successful deathmatches earned him the moniker of "Mr. Danger". After working as W*ING's ace from 1992-1993, Matsunaga left the company and returned to FMW where he headlined the successful 1993 Year End Spectacular event against Atsushi Onita. After an alliance with Onita, Matsunaga formed the W*ING Alliance to feud with FMW and avenge the demise of W*ING from FMW. Initially considered to be Onita's successor as FMW's ace, Matsunaga was demoted from his role and failed to gain prominence in FMW and ultimately quit the company in 1996. He then joined BJW and helped the promotion revolutionize in deathmatch wrestling and became a two-time Deathmatch Heavyweight Champion in the company before quitting in 2001.

== Professional wrestling career ==
=== Frontier Martial-Arts Wrestling (1989–1990) ===
Matsunaga was initially trained in martial arts and worked for the World Karate Association (WKA) organization. He received the training of professional wrestling from fellow karateka Masashi Aoyagi and made his wrestling debut for Atsushi Onita's Grudge in Nagoya event promoted under the Frontier Martial-Arts Wrestling (FMW) banner on October 6, 1989, by defeating Billy Mack. FMW would bring in martial artists and several fighters to combine matches between professional wrestlers and martial artists and Matsunaga would be roped in to tour with FMW for a few more shows as part of FMW's working partnership with WKA. Matsunaga headlined the Battle Creation event on December 10 at the Korakuen Hall in Tokyo by teaming with Jerry Blayman against Onita and Tarzan Goto in the company's first-ever barbed wire deathmatch and the first-ever deathmatch in Japan, which Matsunaga and Blayman lost. This match would set the stage for Matsunaga to establish himself as a deathmatch wrestler. Matsunaga then participated in the Battle Resistance Tournament on January 7, 1990, in which he defeated Katsuji Ueda via disqualification in the first round before losing to eventual winner Masanobu Kurisu in the quarterfinals.

=== New Japan Pro Wrestling (1991) ===
Matsunaga left FMW after the partnership of FMW and WKA ended. He worked two shows for New Japan Pro-Wrestling (NJPW) in the summer of 1991 in which he traded wins with Masashi Aoyagi.

=== Wrestling International New Generations (1991–1993) ===
Matsunaga joined the newly upstart deathmatch wrestling promotion Wrestling International New Generations (W*ING) later that year, making his debut on September 20 by defeating Nobuhiro Tsurumaki. He was soon placed in a rivalry against the company's top villain Mr. Pogo and was pushed as the promotion's top fan favorite and the company's ace. After having faced off against each other in many tag team matches throughout the late 1991, Matsunaga and Pogo competed in their first singles match against one another in a Scramble Bunkhouse Barbed Wire Baseball Bat Deathmatch on March 8, 1992, at Korakuen Hall in Tokyo, which Matsunaga lost. Matsunaga rebounded by defeating Pogo in a Fire Deathmatch at One Night One Soul. Matsunaga competed in many memorable deathmatches throughout 1992 and his rivalry with Mr. Pogo was considered a classic. He was then involved in a feud with Leatherface, to whom he lost in a Barbed Wire Deathmatch on October 28. He then suffered another loss against Leatherface in a Spike Nail Deathmatch at We Love W*ING.

On April 3, 1993, Matsunaga won his first title, the promotion's World Tag Team Championship with Yukihiro Kanemura by defeating Freddie Krueger and Leatherface. He vacated the title only six days later to concentrate on his ongoing feud with Leatherface. On May 5, Matsunaga defeated Leatherface in a Spike Nail Deathmatch to gain his first singles win over his nemesis. Matsunaga then defeated Mr. Pogo in a Scramble Bunkhouse Deathmatch in their last meeting against each other in W*ING as Pogo would leave the company afterwards due to a contract dispute and return to FMW. Following Pogo's departure, Matsunaga continued to feud with Freddie Krueger, Leatherface and The Headhunters throughout the summer of 1993. He also made an appearance for Eastern Championship Wrestling (ECW) in the United States on the August 31 episode of Hardcore TV by teaming with Miguelito Perez to wrestle The Headhunters to a double disqualification. He then toured Mexico to wrestle on two shows for the Universal Wrestling Association (UWA). Matsunaga's final match in W*ING was a WarGames match, in which Matsunaga, Crash the Terminator and W*ING Kanemura lost to Freddie Krueger, Jado and Gedo at Best Champ on August 25.

=== Return to FMW (1993–1996) ===
Matsunaga followed his rival Mr. Pogo and left W*ING to return to FMW on September 15, 1993, as a villain. He teamed with Pogo to defeat Atsushi Onita and Mr. Gannosuke in a No Ropes Barbed Wire Street Fight Deathmatch. Matsunaga feuded with Onita throughout the fall of 1993 and he challenged Onita for the Brass Knuckles Heavyweight Championship in a highly anticipated No Ropes Barbed Wire Deathmatch between the two at Year End Spectacular, which was promoted as the first-ever meeting between FMW's ace and W*ING's ace. Onita retained the title. After the match, Matsunaga made friends with Onita and turned fan favorite as he joined the FMW side to feud with Pogo and his entourage. At FMW 5th Anniversary Show on May 5, 1994, Matsunaga and Tarzan Goto unsuccessfully challenged Pogo and Hisakatsu Oya for the Brass Knuckles Tag Team Championship. On July 31, Matsunaga teamed with Atsushi Onita to defeat Pogo and Oya for the tag team championship. As a result, Matsunaga renewed his W*ING-era rivalry with Mr. Pogo as the two clashed in a Street Fight Deathmatch at Summer Spectacular, which Matsunaga lost.

Matsunaga had gained fame for his deathmatch wrestling style and was considered by Onita to succeed him as FMW's ace after Onita's retirement at FMW 6th Anniversary Show but Matsunaga's box office drawing power was considered weak by management and the management had to change their mind. On September 7, former W*ING wrestler Yukihiro Kanemura debuted in FMW and quickly joined Mr. Pogo and convinced Matsunaga to join them but a reluctant Matsunaga did not agree to the offer. Matsunaga met Kanemura at a hospital where Kanemura was being treated for some burns suffered in a match and Onita got the pictures of the meeting and accused Matsunaga of having turned on FMW and joined Kanemura which upset Matsunaga and he broke up with Onita and turned on FMW to form W*ING Alliance with Kanemura and Pogo to become a villain and feud with FMW. At 6th Anniversary Show on May 5, 1995, the W*ING team of Matsunaga, Hido and Hideki Hosaka lost to Takashi Ishikawa, Apollo Sagawa and Kishin Kawabata. Matsunaga's stock began dropping in FMW and he was mainly utilized in the mid-card. Following Onita's retirement, Matsunaga and Pogo continued their rivalry to maintain the deathmatch wrestling in FMW.

Matsunaga would enter the Grand Slam Tournament for the vacant Brass Knuckles Heavyweight Championship, in which he scored eight points and lost his last match in the tournament against Hayabusa on September 24. After the loss, Matsunaga showed respect to Hayabusa and teased an alliance between FMW and W*ING as the two defeated W*ING Kanemura and Masato Tanaka in a tag team match on October 28. The four men formed an alliance while Super Leather and Hido grew upset at Matsunaga and Kanemura for turning on W*ING and joining FMW and the two joined Lethal Weapon. This turned out to be a ruse as Matsunaga turned on Hayabusa during a match against Mr. Pogo and Super Leather on November 20 and then Matsunaga and Kanemura turned on FMW and Leather and Hido turned on Lethal Weapon to reform W*ING. This was where W*ING regained its spot as the top villainous group and feuded with FMW and Lethal Weapon.

On February 23, 1996, Matsunaga, Hido and W*ING Kanemura lost to Masato Tanaka, Ricky Fuji and Tetsuhiro Kuroda in the first-ever WarGames match in FMW history. After the match, Víctor Quiñones debuted in FMW and led The Headhunters in attacking FMW and W*ING and then Quinones formed Puerto Rican Army in an attempt to take over FMW. FMW and W*ING joined forces and W*ING turned into a fan favorite group. Matsunaga lost to longtime rival Mr. Pogo in a Barbed Wire Double Hell Deathmatch on March 15. Matsunaga was initially scheduled to take on Abdullah the Butcher in a high-profile Barbwire Caribbean Glass Double Hell Deathmatch at FMW 7th Anniversary Show but then Cactus Jack was selected in Abdullah's place. Jack was contracted to World Wrestling Federation (WWF) at the time and WWF did not allow Jack to compete against Matsunaga due to Matsunaga's Hepatitis B and Matsunaga was pulled out of the match by FMW and replaced by W*ING Kanemura. Matsunaga would instead team with Hideki Hosaka and Hido to defeat Miguel Perez, Shoji Nakamaki and Toryu. This would be his last appearance with the company as Matsunaga left FMW due to being unhappy with his spot in the company.

=== Big Japan Pro Wrestling (1996–2001) ===
Matsunaga and Nagasaki did a fantastic job of building up the drama of someone going into the piranha tank. It could have been one of those matches where they just danced around for 16 minutes and teased someone going in. Instead Matsunaga and Nagasaki managed to stay away from the tank during the match and built up a decent story and progression for it to take place. They even made it a point to open each other up and get a lot of their blood into the tank to "fire up" the crazy, biting fish.

— Jerry Palleschi's comments on the Yokohama Piranha Deathmatch on August 19, 1996.

Matsunaga debuted for the new rising deathmatch promotion Big Japan Pro Wrestling (BJW) on July 19, 1996, by teaming with Shoji Nakamaki to defeat Kendo Nagasaki and Seiji Yamakawa in a No Ropes Barbed Wire, Scaffold, Table and Barbed Wire Boards Elimination Deathmatch to begin feuding with Nagasaki. Matsunaga defeated Nagasaki in a singles match on August 5. At Summer Night Dream, Matsunaga competed against Nagasaki in a high-profile Yokohama Amazon River Piranha and Barbed Wire Board Deathmatch, which Nagasaki won. The match earned critical acclaim and would become very popular in Japan and considered to be a pioneer in the popularity and success of deathmatch wrestling in Japan. It was considered by many to be the best deathmatch in Japanese wrestling history.

Daniel Massey of Bleacher Report commented "The piranhas took a chunk out of Matsunaga’s chest and he looked in terrible pain when he left the arena. I don’t wish that on anyone, but he chose to wrestle there and in Japan—had they have been fobbed off with a rubbish ending, there would have been a riot. That does not mean I condone the actions, but that’s what makes it great. The final reason this match was the greatest Death Match of all time was because the wrestlers were so good. Matsunaga was already synonymous with the Death Match format and was considered a veteran, so this new concept of piranhas made it more exciting, as even he hadn’t encountered anything like it before. The two wrestlers had a certain chemistry in the ring, and to hold an audience for 20 minutes with a tank of piranhas in the middle of the ring is no easy feat."

Ryan Byers of 411mania commented "This probably seemed like a fairly revolutionary little match when it first occurred, and the stipulation upon which the match was built is something that has rarely if ever been duplicated. However, if you take away the piranha, there’s nothing that separates it from five hundred other deathmatches that we have seen throughout the years", with "The match is still well worth watching for curiosity’s sake, but I can’t imagine going out of your way to watch it if you’re interesting in seeing a top of the line deathmatch."

Matsunaga competed in a variety of deathmatches during the early years of BJW and helped the promotion to make a mark in the deathmatch wrestling fame in Japan. In the summer of 1998, Matsunaga participated in a tournament to crown the inaugural Deathmatch Heavyweight Champion, losing to The Great Pogo in the final in a Glass and Fire Coffin Cremation Deathmatch on August 9. On August 23, Matsunaga defeated Pogo in a Glass and Fire Coffin Cremation Deathmatch to win the title. Matsunaga lost the title to Shadow WX in a 3-Way Board Alligator Deathmatch on September 23. On August 19, 2001, Matsunaga defeated Zandig in a 200 lighttubes and thumbtack and glass board deathmatch to win his second Deathmatch Heavyweight Championship. Matsunaga lost the title back to Zandig at Ante Up. This was his last appearance with BJW as he left the company after losing the title.

=== Independent circuit (2002–2009) ===
Matsunaga competed as a freelancer in the Japanese independent circuit during the last few years of his career. On September 16, 2002, Matsunaga attacked Mammoth Sasaki with a baseball bat during Sasaki's match against Hisakatsu Oya for the Wrestlings Marvelous Future (WMF) promotion. A match was made between Matsunaga and Sasaki which stipulated that if Matsunaga won then he would be allowed to compete in WMF and deathmatches would also be legal in the company and if he lost then he would be banned from competing in WMF. The match took place on September 30, which Matsunaga lost. Matsunaga would make appearances for Pro Wrestling Zero1 between 2005 and 2008. On December 23, 2009, Matsunaga lost to Akitoshi Saito in his retirement match at a Pro Wrestling NOAH show.

== Personal life ==
After retiring from professional wrestling, Matsunaga opened Mr. Danger, a franchised steakhouse with two Tokyo locations operating out of Sumida City and Taitō City.

== Championships and accomplishments ==
- Big Japan Pro Wrestling
  - BJW Deathmatch Heavyweight Championship (2 times)
- Frontier Martial-Arts Wrestling
  - FMW Brass Knuckles Tag Team Championship (1 time) – with Atsushi Onita
- Wrestling International New Generations
  - W*ING World Tag Team Championship (1 time) – with Yukihiro Kanemura
