= Takashi Uwano =

Japanese professional wrestler

Personal information
- Born: Takashi Uwano; 3 October 1976 (age 49) Sapporo, Hokkaido, Japan

Professional wrestling career
- Billed height: 1.8288 m (6 ft 0 in)
- Billed weight: 224 lb (102 kg)
- Trained by: NJPW dojo, Riki Choshu
- Debut: 1998
- Retired: February 9, 2008

Takashi Uwano (宇和野 貴史, Uwano Takashi; born October 3, 1976) is a retired Japanese professional wrestler most famous for competing with NJPW (New Japan Pro Wrestling) and Pro Wrestling Zero1. Uwano has a background in the martial art, Judo.

== Professional wrestling career ==
=== Various Japanese promotions (1998–2006) ===
Takashi started his wrestling career by competing for DDT Pro-Wrestling and IWA Japan. He competed in a losing effort against Phantom Funakoshi on the 5th anniversary show of IWA Japan in July 1999.

In 2002, Uwano formed a tag team with Keizo Matsuda. The duo took on and defeated tag teams in the IWA, earning a title shot at the IWA World Tag Team Championship in late 2002. On October 1, the team defeated the tag team title holders Jun Izumida and Shoichi Ichimiya. Uwano and Matsuda held the IWA World Tag Team Championship until 2003.

=== New Japan Pro Wrestling (2006–2008) ===
Uwano would sign with NJPW at the start of 2006 thanks to his friend and fellow wrestler, Riki Choshu. Uwano would compete in opening matches for the events on NJPW. He faced the likes of Shinsuke Nakamura. Uwano formed a tag team with Ishii. On January 29, he defeated Mitsuhide Hirasawa, one day after the latter's debut, at a NJPW Circuit 2006 Acceleration event.

=== Retirement ===
On February 29, 2008, Takashi Uwano announced his retirement from professional wrestling. This would end his nine, close to ten year career. Uwano's retirement match saw him defeat Kuniyoshi Wada.

== Championships and accomplishments ==
- International Wrestling Association of Japan
  - IWA World Tag Team Championship (1 time) – with Keizo Matsuda

== In other media ==
Takashi Uwano is a playable character in the video game "King Of Colosseum II" created by Spike for PlayStation 2.

== See also ==
- Pro Wrestling Zero1 roster
- New Japan Pro Wrestling personnel
