= IWA World Heavyweight Championship =

IWA World Heavyweight Championship may refer to:

- IWA Undisputed World Heavyweight Championship (Puerto Rico)
- IWA World Heavyweight Championship (IWA Japan)
- IWA World Heavyweight Championship (International Wrestling Enterprise), in Japan
- IWA World Heavyweight Championship (Australia)
- International Wrestling Association (1970s)'s championship
