= W*ING World Heavyweight Championship =

Details
- Promotion: Wrestling International New Generations (1993–1994); International Wrestling Association of Japan (1995)
- Date established: 1993
- Date retired: 1995
Statistics
- First champion(s): Crash The Terminator
- Most reigns: The Crypt Keeper (2 reigns)
- Longest reign: The Crypt Keeper (202 days)
- Shortest reign: Crash The Terminator (51 days)

The W*ING World Heavyweight Championship (W★ING認定世界ヘビー級王座, uingu nintei sekai hebī-kyū ōza) was a professional wrestling championship contested in Wrestling International New Generations. It was briefly revived in International Wrestling Association of Japan in 1995.

== Title history ==
=== Reigns ===
Key
No.	Overall reign number
Reign	Reign number for the specific champion
Days	Number of days held
(NLT)	Championship change took place "no later than" the date listed

No.	Champion	Championship change			Reign statistics		Notes	Ref.
No.	Champion	Date	Event	Location	Reign	Days	Notes	Ref.
Wrestling International New Generations (W*ING)
1	Crash the Terminator	July 11, 1993	Best Champ 1993	Yokohama, Japan	1	51	Defeated Goliath El Gigante in the finals of a 16-man tournament to win the inaugural title.	
2	Crypt Keeper	August 31, 1993	Hollywood Nightmare	Akita, Japan	1	202		
—	Vacated	March 21, 1994	—	—	—	—	Vacated due to W*ING closing.	
International Wrestling Association of Japan (IWA Japan)
3	Hiroshi Ono	February 2, 1995	A New Trial: Future Road	Tokyo, Japan	1	119	Defeated The Crypt Keeper in a No Referee Ladder Scramble Bunkhouse Deathmatch to win the vacant title.	
4	Crypt Keeper	June 2, 1995	The Heat Is On: Hot Night	Mie, Japan	2	(Note: The exact date the championship was vacated has not been confirmed, putting the title reign at between 1 day and 212 days.)	This was a Ladder Deathmatch.	
—	Deactivated	1995 (NLT)	—	—	—	—	Title retired.	

=== Combined reigns ===
¤	The exact length of at least one title reign is uncertain, so the shortest possible length is used.

Rank	Wrestler	No. of reigns	Combined days
1	Crypt Keeper	2	203¤
2	Hiroshi Ono	1	119
3	Crash the Terminator	1	51

== See also ==
- IWA World Heavyweight Championship (IWA Japan)
