= BJW Deathmatch Heavyweight Championship =

Professional wrestling championship

- Official design of the BJW Deathmatch Heavyweight Championship (2012 – present)

Details
- Promotion: Big Japan Pro Wrestling
- Date established: August 9, 1998
- Current champion: Abdullah Kobayashi
- Date won: January 2, 2026
Statistics
- First champion: The Great Pogo
- Most reigns: Ryuji Ito and Abdullah Kobayashi (7 reigns)
- Longest reign: Ryuji Ito (850 days)
- Shortest reign: Ryuji Ito (4 days)
- Oldest champion: Abdullah the Butcher (57 years, 11 months and 30 days)
- Youngest champion: Drew Parker (23 years, 6 months and 24 days)
- Heaviest champion: Abdullah the Butcher (502 lb)
- Lightest champion: Isami Kodaka and Drew Parker (165 lb)

The BJW Deathmatch Heavyweight Championship (BJW認定デスマッチヘビー級王座, BJW nintei desumacchi hebī-kyū ōza) is a title contested for in the Japanese promotion Big Japan Pro Wrestling. As its name suggests, it is exclusively defended in deathmatches. It was first created in 1998 when The Great Pogo defeated Mitsuhiro Matsunaga in a tournament final. There have been a total of 23 recognized champions who have had a combined 48 official reigns. The current champion is Yusaku Ito who is in his first reign.

== Inaugural tournament ==
A single elimination tournament was set up to crown the inaugural champion which took place between June 8 and August 9, 1998.

Quarterfinals
Mitsuhiro Matsunaga	Pin
Jason the Terrible	14:29
Shadow Winger	Pin
Shoji Nakamaki	7:29
The Great Pogo	Pin
Kung Fu Lee	9:23
Shadow WX	Pin
Tomoaki Honma	16:22

Semifinals
Mitsuhiro Matsunaga	Pin
Shadow Winger	10:21
The Great Pogo	Pin
Shadow WX	15:02

Final
Mitsuhiro Matsunaga	Pin
The Great Pogo	8:36

== Title history ==
Key
No.	Overall reign number
Reign	Reign number for the specific champion
Days	Number of days held
Defenses	Number of successful defenses
(NLT)	Championship change took place "no later than" the date listed
+	Current reign is changing daily

No.	Champion	Championship change			Reign statistics			Notes	Ref.
No.	Champion	Date	Event	Location	Reign	Days	Defenses	Notes	Ref.
1	The Great Pogo	August 9, 1998	Big Japan Fighter Declaration 1998	Kawasaki, Japan	1	14	0	Defeated Mitsuhiro Matsunaga in a glass and fire coffin cremation deathmatch tournament final.	
2	Mitsuhiro Matsunaga	August 23, 1998	Big Japan Fighter Declaration 1998	Osaka, Japan	1	31	0	This was a glass and fire coffin cremation deathmatch.	
3	Shadow WX	September 23, 1998	BJ Hard Core	Tokyo, Japan	1	109	1	This was a three-way board alligator deathmatch.	
4	Abdullah the Butcher	January 10, 1999	House show	Fukuoka, Japan	1	49	0	This was a lumberjack deathmatch.	
5	Shadow WX	February 28, 1999	House show	Tokyo, Japan	2	91	1	This was a barbed wire board deathmatch.	
6	Ryuji Yamakawa	May 30, 1999	House show	Osaka, Japan	1	72	1	This was a no rope barbed wire death pallet coffin and fire deathmatch.	
7	Shadow WX	August 10, 1999	House show	Osaka, Japan	3	116	2	This was a no rope barbed wire fire deathmatch.	
8	Ryuji Yamakawa	December 4, 1999	House show	Yokohama, Japan	2	29	0	This was a four-corner lighttubes board deathmatch.	
9	Tomoaki Honma	January 2, 2000	New Year Great Series 2000	Tokyo, Japan	1	182	1	This was a five-inch spike nail and barbed wire double board quarterfinal deathmatch in the BJ Grand Prix 2000 tournament.	
10	Zandig	July 2, 2000	BJ Hardcore Series II 2000	Tokyo, Japan	1	144	2	This was a lemon, salt and mustard deathmatch.	
11	Tomoaki Honma	November 23, 2000	Wonder BJ 2000 Series	Yokohama, Japan	2	(Note: The date of at least one of the title changes in this reign is uncertain, which means that the reign lasted between 70 and 97 days.)	2	This was a lemon, salt and mustard deathmatch.	
—	Vacated	February 2001 (NLT)	—	—	—	—	—	Honma was stripped of the title after he left BJW.	
12	Zandig	May 4, 2001	North Wave 2001	Sapporo, Japan	2	107	1	Defeated Kintaro Kanemura in a CZW Caribbean-style barbed wire, lighttubes, lighttubes board and barbed wire chess board deathmatch to win the vacant title.	
13	Mitsuhiro Matsunaga	August 19, 2001	Universe 2001	Yokohama, Japan	2	105	0	This was a 200 lighttubes and thumbtack and glass board deathmatch.	
14	Zandig	December 2, 2001	Ante Up 2001	Yokohama, Japan	3	(Note: The date of at least one of the title changes in this reign is uncertain, which means that the reign lasted between 30 and 394 days.)	0	This was an exploding glass, lighttubes and thumbtacks deathmatch.	
—	Vacated	2002 (NLT)	—	—	—	—	—	When Combat Zone Wrestling (CZW) and BJW's business relationship ended, Zandig left the company with the title belt. The belt was used in CZW to represent the new CZW Death Match Championship. BJW vacated the title in 2002. In 2003, the title belt returned to Japan and a tournament was held to crown a new champion.	
15	Kintaro Kanemura	March 30, 2003	Harder Than Hardcore IV	Yokohama, Japan	1	147	1	Defeated Shadow WX in a lighttubes and glass deathmatch to win the vacant title.	
16	Ryuji Ito	August 24, 2003	HTH5 Series 2003	Yokohama, Japan	1	850	6	This was a steel cage match.	
17	Abdullah Kobayashi	December 21, 2005	House show	Yokohama, Japan	1	100	0	This was a scaffold match.	
18	Takashi Sasaki	March 31, 2006	House show	Tokyo, Japan	1	163	1	This was a lighttubes and bed of nails deathmatch.	
19	Ryuji Ito	September 10, 2006	House show	Yokohama, Japan	2	4	0	This was a lighttubes, bunkhouse, double hell, super high ladder, and barbed wire Hell deathmatch.	
—	Vacated	September 14, 2006	—	—	—	—	—	Vacated due to a wrist injury.	
20	Takashi Sasaki	December 3, 2006	House show	Yokohama, Japan	2	266	2	Defeated "Black Angel" Jaki Numazawa in a lighttubes shrine deathmatch to win the vacant title.	
21	"Black Angel" Jaki Numazawa	August 26, 2007	Pro-Wrestling Summit in Ariake	Tokyo, Japan	1	110	1		
22	Ryuji Ito	December 14, 2007	House show	Yokohama, Japan	3	142	1	This was a four corner cross of D match.	
23	Shadow WX	May 4, 2008	Katsura Special 14	Koshigaya, Japan	4	229	3	This was a fluorescent lighttube boards and weapons deathmatch.	
24	Yuko Miyamoto	December 19, 2008	House show	Yokohama, Japan	1	501	4		
25	Ryuji Ito	May 4, 2010	BJW 15th Anniversary Show	Yokohama, Japan	4	593	6	This was a 200 fluorescent lighttubes cage deathmatch.	
26	Abdullah Kobayashi	December 18, 2011	Big Japan Death Vegas 2011	Yokohama, Japan	2	381	7	This was a Game of Death deathmatch.	
27	Shuji Ishikawa	January 2, 2013	House show	Tokyo, Japan	1	306	4	This was a glass board and new year deathmatch.	
28	Isami Kodaka	November 4, 2013	Big Japan Death Vegas 2013	Yokohama, Japan	1	202	4	This was a culture of death match.	
29	Ryuji Ito	May 25, 2014	Death Market 21	Nagoya, Japan	5	21	0	This was a two-out-of-three falls match.	
30	Yuko Miyamoto	June 15, 2014	House show	Hiroshima, Japan	2	324	5		
31	Abdullah Kobayashi	May 5, 2015	Endless Survivor 2015	Yokohama, Japan	2	76	0		
32	Ryuji Ito	July 20, 2015	Ryōgokutan 2015	Tokyo, Japan	6	370	5		
33	Kankuro Hoshino	July 24, 2016	Ryōgokutan 2016	Tokyo, Japan	1	147	3		
34	Abdullah Kobayashi	December 18, 2016	Big Japan Death Vegas 2016	Yokohama, Japan	4	138	0		
35	Masaya Takahashi	May 5, 2017	Endless Survivor 2017	Yokohama, Japan	1	106	2	This was a Spike nails and 150 lighttubes deathmatch.	
36	Masashi Takeda	August 19, 2017	Death Mania V	Nagoya, Japan	1	449	9		
37	Masaya Takahashi	November 11, 2018	Ryōgokutan 2018	Tokyo, Japan	2	175	3		
38	Isami Kodaka	May 5, 2019	Endless Survivor 2019	Yokohama, Japan	2	227	4		
39	Abdullah Kobayashi	December 18, 2019	Big Japan Pro Wrestling 25th Anniversary Memorial	Yokohama, Japan	5	89	1		
40	Ryuji Ito	March 16, 2020	BJW Dai Nippon Pro-Wrestling 25th Anniversary ~ Stardust Superstars	Yokohama, Japan	7	165	0		
41	Minoru Fujita	August 29, 2020	Last Buntai at BJW	Yokohama, Japan	1	128	3		
42	Takumi Tsukamoto	January 2, 2021	BJW 2021 New Year	Tokyo, Japan	1	202	1		
43	Drew Parker	July 23, 2021	BJW Korakuen Hall Tournament	Tokyo, Japan	1	44	1	This was a Barbed wire casket and Fluorescent light tubes Death Match	
44	Yuko Miyamoto	September 5, 2021	BJW Death Mania IX 2021	Nagoya, Japan	3	242	5	This was a tables, ladders & chairs deathmatch	
45	Drew Parker	May 5, 2022	BJW Big Japan Welcome Back	Yokohama, Japan	2	8	1	This was a scaffold & alpha deathmatch	
—	Vacated	May 13, 2022	BJW	Tokyo, Japan	—	—	—	Parker vacated the championship upon leaving BJW.	
46	Hideyoshi Kamitani	August 28, 2022	BJW Death Mania X 2022	Nagoya, Japan	1	249	4	Kamitani defeated Abdullah Kobayashi in the finals of a tournament which was contested in a fluorescent lighttubes jungle deathmatch.	
47	Abdullah Kobayashi	May 4, 2023	BJW Endless Survivor ~ Infinity Independent	Yokohama, Japan	6	73	0	This was a Yokohama explosion jungle deathmatch.	
48	Yuki Ishikawa	July 16, 2023	BJW	Tokyo, Japan	1	167	4	This was a deathmatch.	
49	Mad Man Pondo	December 30, 2023	BJW	Tokyo, Japan	1	5	0	This was a fluorescent lighttubes & Illinois street fight deathmatch.	
50	Yuki Ishikawa	January 4, 2024	BJW Deathmatch King Death	Tokyo, Japan	2	101	1	This was a lighttube deathmatch.	
51	Hideyoshi Kamitani	April 14, 2024	BJW New Standard Big "B" ~ Feelin' Come 2024	Sapporo, Japan	2	349	3	This was a high pressure deathmatch.	
52	Akira	March 29, 2025	BJW	Tokyo, Japan	1	148	3	This was a Tokyo SOS crazy monster deathmatch.	
53	Yusaku Ito	August 24, 2025	BJW Death Mania XIII 2025 ~ Back To Inazawa	Inazawa, Japan	1	131	3	This was a Under The Sea deathmatch.	
54	Abdullah Kobayashi	January 2, 2026	BJW 2026 New Year's Battle Begins	Tokyo, Japan	7	284+	7		

== Combined reigns ==
As of October 13, 2026.

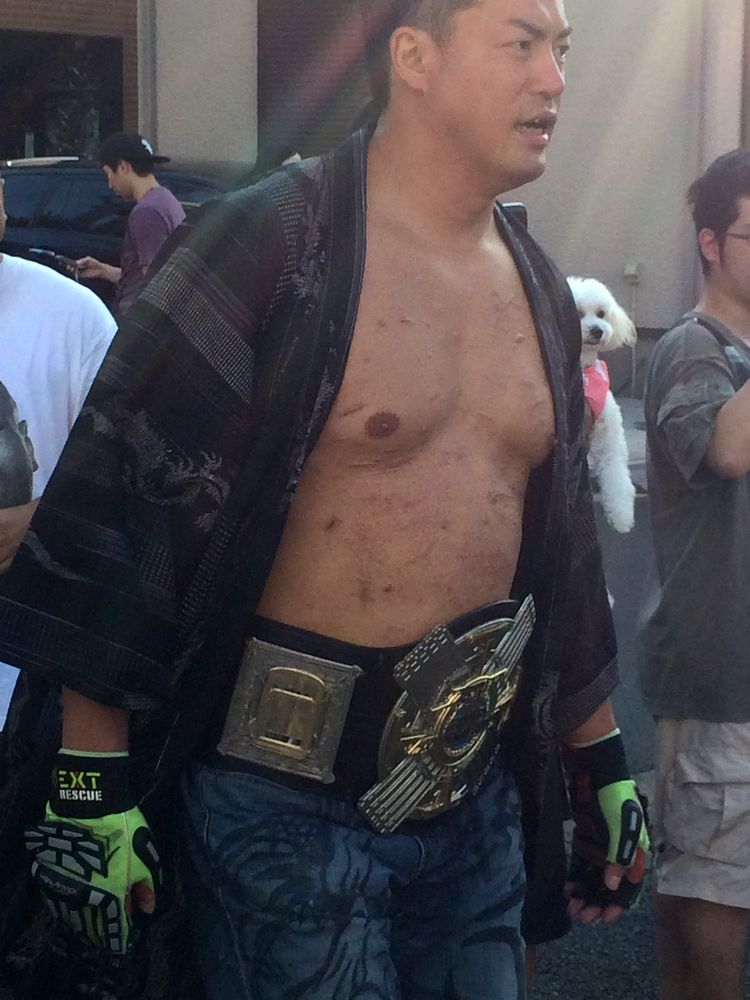
Record tied seven-time, longest single and combined reigning champion Ryuji Ito with the title belt in August 2015.

†	Indicates the current champion
¤	The exact length of at least one title reign is uncertain, so the shortest possible length is used.

Rank	Wrestler	No. of reigns	Combined defenses	Combined days
1	Ryuji Ito	7	18	2,145
2	Abdullah Kobayashi †	7	16	1,143+
3	Yuko Miyamoto	3	14	1,067
4	Hideyoshi Kamitani	2	7	598
5	Shadow WX	4	7	545
6	Masashi Takeda	1	9	449
7	Isami Kodaka	2	8	429
7	Takashi Sasaki	2	3	429
9	Shuji Ishikawa	1	4	306
10	Masaya Takahashi	2	5	281
10	Zandig	3	3	281¤
12	Yuki Ishikawa	2	5	268
13	Tomoaki Honma	2	3	252¤
14	Takumi Tsukamoto	1	1	202
15	Akira	1	3	148
16	Kankuro Hoshino	1	3	147
16	Kintaro Kanemura	1	1	147
18	Mitsuhiro Matsunaga	2	0	136
19	Yusaku Ito	1	3	131
20	Minoru Fujita	1	3	128
21	"Black Angel" Jaki Numazawa	1	1	110
22	Ryuji Yamakawa	2	1	101
23	Drew Parker	2	2	52
24	Abdullah the Butcher	1	0	49
25	The Great Pogo	1	0	14
26	Mad Man Pondo	1	0	5
