= Jim Duggan =

American professional wrestler (born 1954)

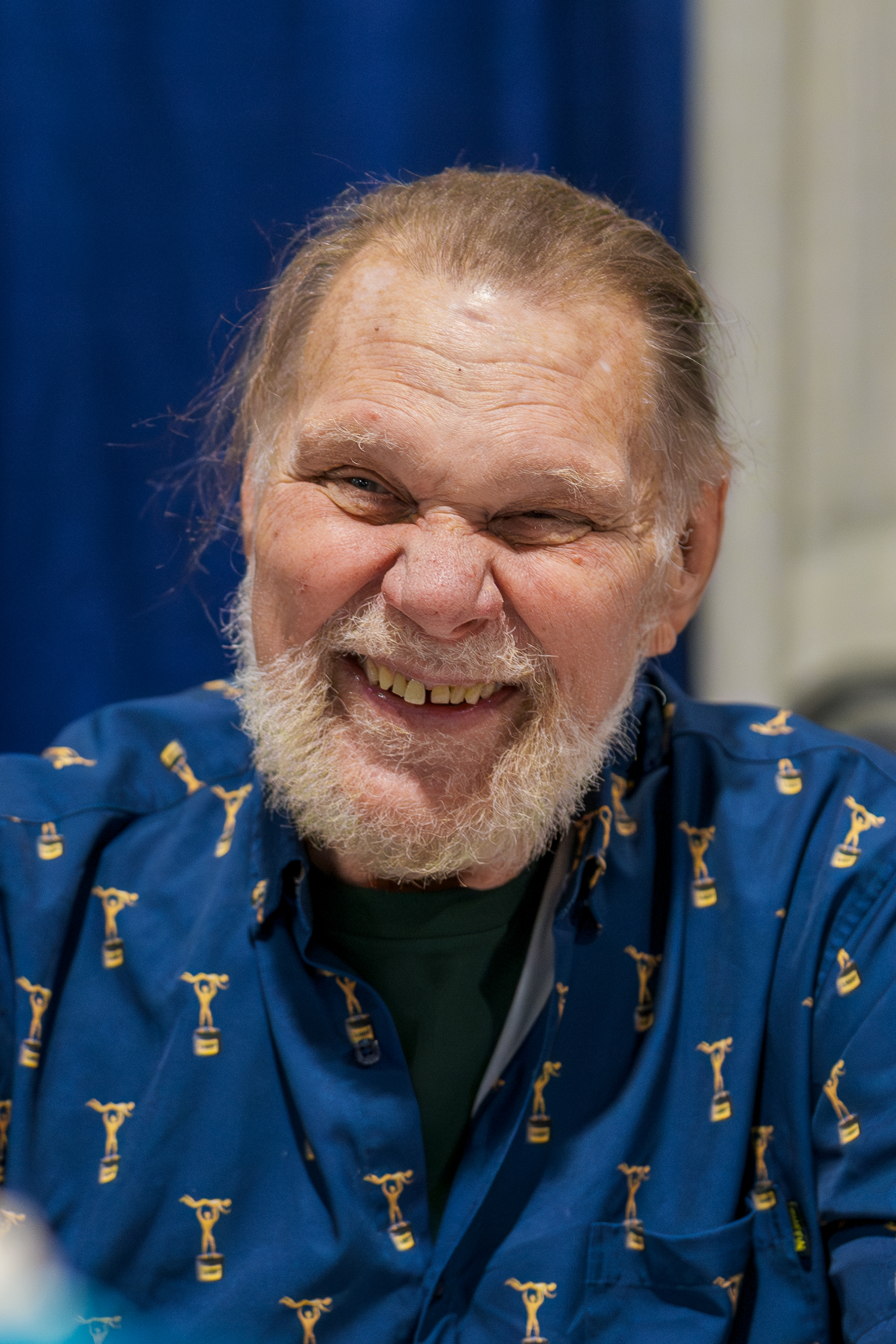
- Duggan at GalaxyCon Richmond in 2026

Personal information
- Born: James Edward Duggan Jr. January 14, 1954 (age 72) Glens Falls, New York, U.S.
- Education: Southern Methodist University
- Spouse: Debra Duggan (m. 1989)
- Children: 2

Professional wrestling career
- Ring names: The Convict; Derek Wood; Jim Duggan; King Duggan
- Billed height: 6 ft 3 in (191 cm)
- Billed weight: 270 lb (122 kg)
- Billed from: Glens Falls, New York
- Trained by: Fritz Von Erich
- Debut: 1979
- Retired: May 12, 2019

James Edward Duggan Jr. (born January 14, 1954), better known by his ring name "Hacksaw" Jim Duggan, is an American retired professional wrestler. As of February 2025, he is signed to WWE under a Legends contract. He was inducted into the WWE Hall of Fame in 2011.

Beginning his career in 1979, Duggan first came to national prominence during his time with Mid-South Wrestling from 1982 to 1986. He achieved his greatest fame during his run with the World Wrestling Federation (WWF, now WWE) from 1987 to 1993 – where he won the inaugural Royal Rumble in 1988 – and with World Championship Wrestling (WCW) from 1994 to 2001, where he was a WCW United States Heavyweight Champion and the final WCW World Television Champion. In 2004, he won the IWA World Heavyweight Championship in Tokyo, making him a one-time wrestling world champion. He retired in 2019, marking the end of a career that spanned 40 years and five decades.

== Early life and career ==
James Edward Duggan Jr. was born on January 14, 1954, in Glens Falls, New York, to James Edward Duggan Sr., a police officer, and Celia Meadows Duggan. He grew up alongside his three older sisters.

Duggan attended Glens Falls High School, where he was a letterman in football, track, wrestling, and basketball. In wrestling, Duggan went undefeated his junior and senior year, winning a section 2 championship both years, and during his senior season he won the New York State High School wrestling championship in the unlimited weight division.

After graduating from high school, Duggan was recruited by Ohio State University, but instead choose to play football at Southern Methodist University, where he was eventually voted team captain. Duggan earned his bachelor's degree in applied plant biology. After college, Duggan was signed by the Atlanta Falcons of the National Football League, but was released after being plagued by knee injuries.

== Professional wrestling career ==
=== Early career (1979–1981) ===
Duggan broke into professional wrestling thanks in large part to wrestler Fritz Von Erich. The two met while Duggan was on a recruiting trip to Southern Methodist University. Duggan's first professional match was in 1979 against Gino Hernandez. Duggan began his career as a villain. Training at the Sportatorium in Dallas, Texas as well as with Samoan wrestling promoter Peter Maivia, Duggan gained the attention of Vincent J. McMahon and the World Wrestling Federation (WWF).

After a brief stint with the WWF, Duggan began to work regularly for Georgia Championship Wrestling. During this time, Duggan was known by two in-ring aliases: in the Contiguous United States as "Big" Jim Duggan and in Hawaii as The Convict, a masked wrestler. After wrestling for a Birmingham, Alabama-based promotion, Duggan began wrestling for Southwest Championship Wrestling based in San Antonio, Texas where he adopted his well-known "Hacksaw" nickname.

=== New Japan Pro-Wrestling (1981) ===
In August 1981, while still wrestling in Georgia, Duggan toured throughout Japan under New Japan Pro-Wrestling, during their Bloody Fight Series tour, facing Antonio Inoki in the first day of August 21, in a losing effort. Duggan would defeat low-card wrestlers such as Haruka Eigen, Kengo Kimura, Ryūma Gō and Kantaro Hoshino, while losing to main eventers such as Inoki, Tatsumi Fujinami, Seiji Sakaguchi, Strong Kobayashi and Tiger Toguchi. At one point, he teamed up with Bad News Allen to face the teams of Eigen and Gō, in a winning effort, and Choshu and Sakaguchi, in a losing effort.

=== Mid-South Wrestling / Universal Wrestling Federation (1982–1987) ===
In 1982, Duggan made his debut in Mid-South Wrestling. Upon debuting as a heel, and bounty hunter for Skandor Akbar, Duggan soon became a member of the Rat Pack stable, alongside Ted DiBiase, Matt Borne, and Mr. Olympia. After newcomer "Hacksaw" Butch Reed debuted within the promotion, Duggan and Reed feuded over who would be the true "Hacksaw". The Rat Pack also feuded with babyfaces such as Reed, Magnum T. A. and the Junkyard Dog. During this time, Duggan interfered in a DiBiase/Junkyard Dog match while wearing a gorilla suit during the Louisiana State Fair, causing Junkyard Dog to lose a loser leaves town match in Shreveport, Louisiana. After DiBiase aligned himself with Skandor Akbar, Duggan refused to go along with him and became a face for the first time in his career. At this time, Duggan began carrying his iconic 2x4.

As a babyface, he won the Mid-South Tag Team Championship with Magnum T. A. and later won the Mid-South North American Heavyweight Championship. After the Mid-South North American Championship was retired when Mid-South became the Universal Wrestling Federation (UWF) in 1986, Duggan lost to Terry Gordy in a tournament final to determine the first UWF World Heavyweight Champion. Duggan then teamed up with Terry Taylor and won the UWF World Tag Team Championship for the second time. After losing a loser leaves town match to the One Man Gang in January 1987, Duggan left the UWF for the World Wrestling Federation (WWF).

=== New Japan Pro-Wrestling (1986) ===
In January 1986, while he was now working under Bill Watts' Universal Wrestling Federation, Duggan would once again venture overseas to New Japan, now wrestling in their New Year Dash tour, coincidentally facing Inoki once again in the first day of their tour on January 3, this time ending in a double count-out. Duggan, a now more established wrestler, was receiving a lot of good results during the tour, clashing with main eventers such as Fujinami, Sakaguchi, Kimura and Choshu to draws, and dominating young lions such as Tatsutoshi Goto and Yang-Seung Hi. He also wrestled tag-team action during the series, teaming with the likes of Tony St. Clair, Johnny Mantell, Black Tiger, Mike Miller and the twin-team of Madd Maxx (1 & 2), with the majority of them ending in the losing end for Duggan's team.

Duggan would tour one last time overseas in September of the same year, wrestling on New Japan's Challenge Spirit tour, resuming his encounters against Inoki, Fujinami, Kimura and Sakaguchi, as well as facing Umanosuke Ueda and George Takano in tag-team matches, teaming once again with Madd Maxx, Jerry Gray and The Angel Of Death. His last match came against Seiji Sakaguchi in a double count-out.

=== World Wrestling Federation (1987–1993) ===
==== Early feuds (1987–1988) ====
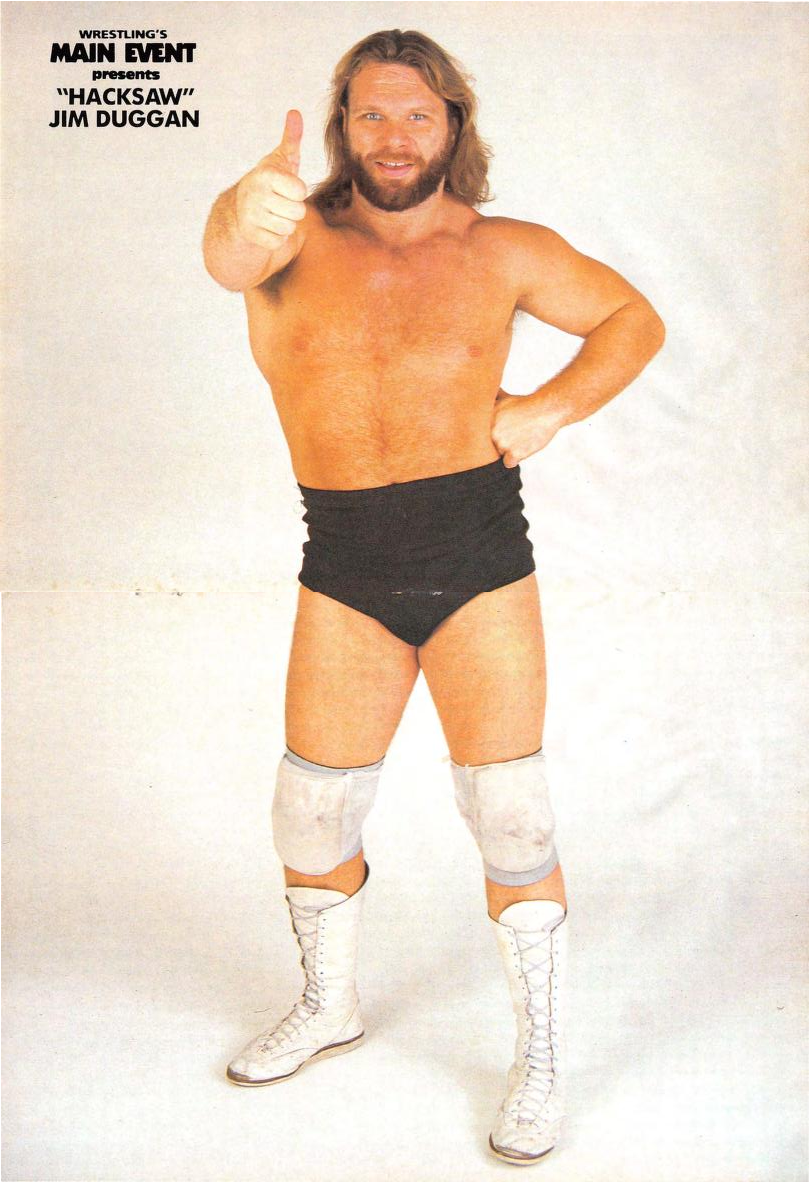
Jim Duggan, c. 1987

In January 1987, Duggan was signed by the World Wrestling Federation (WWF). He began his first WWF feud with Nikolai Volkoff. At WrestleMania III, he ran to ringside prior to a match between The Killer Bees and The Iron Sheik and Nikolai Volkoff and interrupted Volkoff's pre-match singing of the Russian national anthem. Duggan had previously done this on TV matches leading up to the event.

On May 26, 1987, Duggan and the Iron Sheik were arrested for DUI in New Jersey. Duggan was released from the company, but was ultimately brought back in a lower spot on the roster. Although he did not win any major titles in the promotion, for seven years he was a consistent fan favorite with his patriotic working class everyman gimmick. His character was mainly comical, as he rarely was in major contention for titles. His first major WWF match was at the inaugural Survivor Series in November 1987, where he participated in the first Survivor Series match and was a member of the winning team.

In late 1987, Duggan received his first major push since his return, being placed in a feud opposite "King" Harley Race, who was using a "monarch" gimmick; sneering at wrestlers he thought were below him. During a televised confrontation, Duggan took Race's crown and cape, though Race would later get them back. At the 1987 Slammy Awards, where Duggan presented the nominees for "Best Ring Apparel", an on-stage shoving match between him and the winner (Race), sparked a brawl, going backstage and eventually reaching back to the main stage before interrupting another award presentation. Gorilla Monsoon stepped in to separate the two. Duggan eventually defeated Race several times in both televised and non-televised shows.

==== First Royal Rumble winner (1988–1989) ====
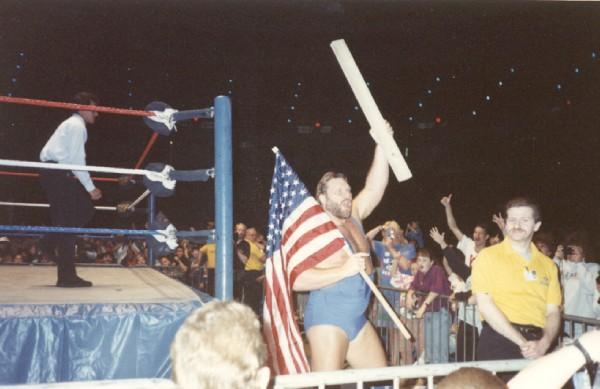
Duggan in a WWF event

Duggan participated in the first-ever Royal Rumble match in 1988, where he was the 13th of twenty entrants. He won the match after he last eliminated the One Man Gang.

At WrestleMania IV, he participated in a 14-man tournament for the vacant WWF World Heavyweight Championship, where he lost to Ted DiBiase in the first round after interference from André the Giant. Shortly after WrestleMania IV, Duggan—upset that André cost him his match—came to the ring during one of André's matches and challenged him; a feud erupted when André suddenly grabbed Duggan and began throttling him, before Duggan knocked André out with his 2x4 board. André generally came out the winner in their matches, usually by interference from André's manager Bobby Heenan. André also interfered in several of Duggan's matches against other wrestlers, including Hercules on the April 30 edition of Saturday Night's Main Event.

Duggan earned a shot at the Intercontinental Heavyweight Championship against The Honky Tonk Man in July 1988, but Honky Tonk got himself disqualified, thus retaining the title.

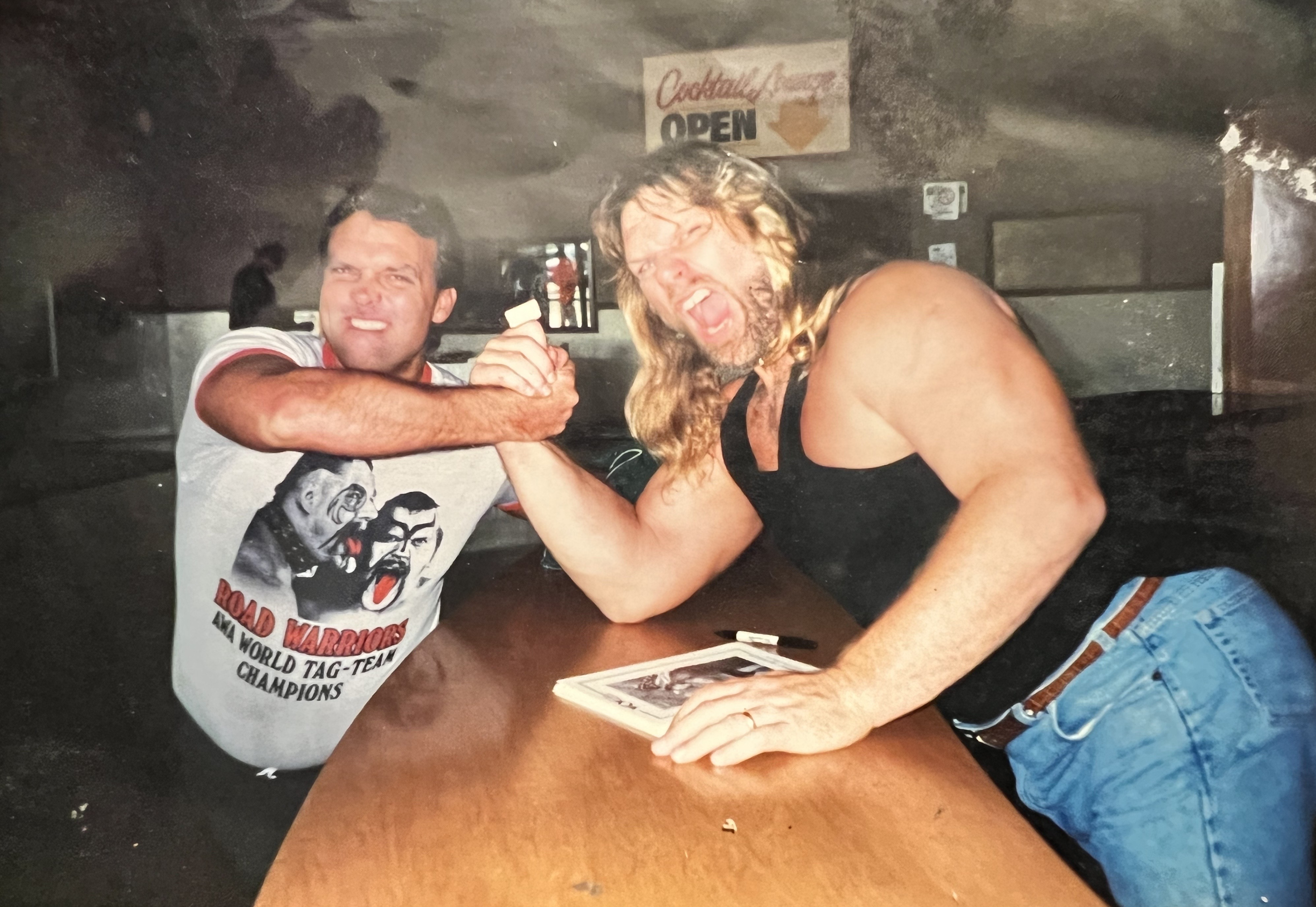
Jim Duggan with fan in Dayton, Ohio, 1988

Duggan then began displaying traits of an American patriot by feuding with several foreign villains in the fall of 1988. He got involved in a feud with Dino Bravo, and the two were on opposing sides as Jake "The Snake" Roberts' team fought André the Giant's at the 1988 Survivor Series. Duggan was disqualified after he used his 2x4 on Bravo. Duggan's team eventually lost the match. His next feud was with Russian Boris Zhukov, whom he defeated in a flag match on the November 26 edition of Saturday Night's Main Event. He restarted his feud with Dino Bravo, and at the 1989 Royal Rumble, Duggan and The Hart Foundation (Bret Hart and Jim Neidhart) defeated Bravo and The Fabulous Rougeau Brothers (Jacques and Raymond) in a two out of three falls match. He was involved in a rivalry with Bad News Brown, which culminated in a match at WrestleMania V where both men fought to a no contest.

==== King and American patriot (1989–1993) ====
In mid-1989, he started a feud with King Haku, who was awarded the crown on the July 9, 1988 edition of Superstars when Harley Race was forced to vacate the crown due to injuries sustained in a match against Hulk Hogan on the March 12, 1988 edition of Saturday Night's Main Event. Duggan defeated Haku to win the crown and earn the title of "King of the WWF" on the May 13, 1989 edition of Superstars. On the May 27 edition of Saturday Night's Main Event, Duggan earned a shot at the Intercontinental Championship against "Ravishing" Rick Rude. Duggan won the match by countout, and Rude retained the title, as a title cannot change hands via countout or disqualification. At SummerSlam, Duggan teamed with Demolition (Ax and Smash) in a six-man tag team match and defeated André the Giant and The Twin Towers (Akeem and The Big Bossman).

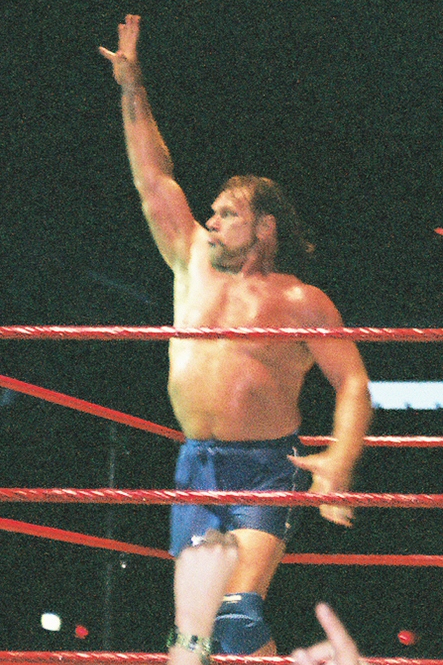
Duggan poses for the fans.

He eventually lost his crown to "Macho Man" Randy Savage, who began calling himself "Macho King", and started a feud with Savage. At Survivor Series, he captained a team dubbed "The 4x4's" against Savage's team, "The King's Court". Duggan's team lost the match. He faced Savage again on the January 27 edition of Saturday Night's Main Event. Duggan defeated another former rival, Dino Bravo at WrestleMania VI. He began teaming with his former rival, Nikolai Volkoff and started a feud with The Orient Express (Tanaka and Sato), whom they beat at SummerSlam. He began a short feud with WWF World Heavyweight Champion Sgt. Slaughter and faced Slaughter for the title on the February 1 edition of The Main Event. Slaughter retained the title by getting himself disqualified.

In late 1991, he patched up things with Sgt. Slaughter, who had turned babyface, and the pair formed a tag team. At Survivor Series, the duo joined the Texas Tornado and Tito Santana in an elimination match to defeat a team led by Col. Mustafa. On the February 8 edition of Saturday Night's Main Event, Duggan and Slaughter defeated the Beverly Brothers (Blake and Beau). At WrestleMania VIII, he teamed up with Virgil, Sgt. Slaughter, and Big Bossman against The Nasty Boys (Jerry Sags and Brian Knobs), The Mountie, and Repo Man. Slaughter eventually left active wrestling and Duggan continued to pursue his singles career again.

In mid-1992, Duggan was moved to undercard status. In early 1993, he was involved in a feud with the then near 600 pound Yokozuna, who was the number one contender to the WWF Championship. Manager Mr. Fuji was bad mouthing America and Duggan challenged his protégé to a match. The match was promoted by claiming that no one had knocked Yokozuna off his feet, even though Yokozuna had fallen off his feet shortly before, during the 1993 Royal Rumble match. The stipulations to the match were if Duggan knocked Yokozuna off his feet, Duggan would win. On the February 6 edition of Superstars, Duggan won the match after knocking Yokozuna down completely, but then was manhandled by the much bigger Yokozuna after the match and fell victim to four Banzai Drops, sidelining Duggan for about four months.

Duggan eventually returned to television and started a feud with then-Intercontinental Champion Shawn Michaels, challenging him for the title on the May 3 edition of Monday Night Raw. Michaels ran through the crowd, and retained the title by countout. On the next show, to prevent Michaels from pulling the stunt again, Duggan received a return bout in a lumberjack match. Before the match started, Duggan attacked his former rival Yokozuna after discovering he was one of the lumberjacks. Late in the match, Bam Bam Bigelow distracted Duggan from the outside, which enabled Michaels to attack him and throw him out of the ring to where Yokozuna was standing. Yokozuna then paid Duggan back by legdropping him on the floor, then rolled his lifeless body back into the ring as the referee's back was turned. As Michaels went to pin Duggan, Mr. Perfect entered the ring and attacked the champion, which resulted in Duggan being disqualified and touching off a postmatch brawl between the lumberjacks; Duggan would eventually rise to his feet and clear the ring with his 2x4. Duggan then competed in the King of the Ring tournament, defeating Papa Shango to qualify before losing to Bam Bam Bigelow in the quarterfinals. He continued to appear on WWF programming until August 1993, when he left the WWF after losing several pre-Summerslam matches to Yokozuna.

=== Various promotions (1993–1994) ===
Shortly after leaving the WWF, Duggan began wrestling on the independent circuit. He also wrestled a handful of matches in Europe for World Wrestling Superstars and the Catch Wrestling Association.

=== World Championship Wrestling (1994–2001) ===
==== United States Heavyweight Champion (1994–1995) ====
In mid-1994, Duggan signed a contract with World Championship Wrestling (WCW). He debuted in WCW in July 1994, defeating Tex Slazenger in a dark match. He made his televised debut the following month on WCW Saturday Night. In September 1994, Duggan participated in WCW's "Hulkamania" tour of Europe.

At Fall Brawl '94: War Games on September 18, 1994, Duggan defeated Steve Austin in a squash match lasting thirty-five seconds to win the WCW United States Heavyweight Championship. The result prompted a feud with Austin, who Duggan defeated in a title rematch at Halloween Havoc by disqualification. The two had a second title rematch on November 16 at Clash of the Champions XXIX, where Duggan again retained the title by disqualification. Duggan's reign ended in December at Starrcade '94: Triple Threat, where he was defeated by Vader. Duggan repeatedly challenged Vader in a series of matches lasting till March 1995, but was unable to regain the title.

==== Various feuds; hiatus (1995–1998) ====
Duggan defeated Bunkhouse Buck at SuperBrawl V. He faced former WWF rival Meng (known as Haku in WWF) in a martial arts match at Uncensored, which Meng won. At The Great American Bash, he defeated Sgt. Craig Pittman by disqualification in Pittman's pay-per-view debut. At Bash at the Beach, Duggan lost to Kamala.

In late 1995, Duggan started a feud with Big Bubba Rogers, which culminated in a Taped Fist match at World War 3, which Rogers won. Duggan participated in the first-ever three ring, 60 man battle royal for the vacant World Heavyweight Championship, but was eliminated. He fought Loch Ness to a double disqualification at a Main Event taping before SuperBrawl VI. Duggan then started a short feud with Diamond Dallas Page, to whom he lost in a taped fist match at Bash at the Beach. At World War 3 in November 1996, he unsuccessfully participated in a three ring 60 man battle royal to determine the #1 contender to the WCW World Heavyweight Championship.

On April 2, 1998, Duggan teamed with radio personality Bubba the Love Sponge to defeat the Texas Hangmen at "Malice at the Palace", an event held in the Ice Palace in Tampa, Florida that was live streamed.

Duggan disappeared from WCW in August 1998 after he was diagnosed with kidney cancer.

==== Return; World Television Champion; Millionaire's Club (1999–2000) ====
After being cured of his cancer, Duggan returned to wrestling in April 1999. He replaced Buff Bagwell in a match against Berlyn at Fall Brawl, which Duggan lost. Soon after, Duggan became involved in a storyline where he became a janitor for WCW.

In late 1999, Duggan started a feud with the anti-American stable the Revolution (Shane Douglas, Dean Malenko, Perry Saturn, and Asya). At Starrcade, he and his surprise partners, the newly reunited Varsity Club (Kevin Sullivan, Mike Rotunda, and Rick Steiner), faced the Revolution in a losing effort after the Club turned on Duggan. As a result of losing, the next night on Nitro, Duggan was forced to denounce the U.S. flag but he refused to do so. In response, the Revolution attacked him and began beating him until the Filthy Animals, who were also feuding with the Revolution, saved Duggan.

In February 2000, Duggan found the WCW World Television Championship in a trash can, which had been thrown away by the previous champion Scott Hall earlier and claimed it for himself. He would make title defenses exclusively on Saturday Night, and remained champion until the title was deactivated.

After WCW was rebooted and the nWo storyline ended, it was replaced by two new factions in WCW called the Millionaire's Club and the New Blood, which began feuding with one another. The Millionaire's Club consisted of veterans and the New Blood consisted of young wrestlers of the 1990s. Duggan joined the Millionaire's Club and helped them in their war against the New Blood.

==== Team Canada (2000–2001) ====
Near the end of his career in WCW, Duggan became involved in more major storylines, including one that involved him becoming a villain by abandoning the patriotic gimmick for a short time to join Lance Storm and his faction Team Canada. This angle began when Duggan started working with the Misfits In Action (MIA) but at Fall Brawl, he turned on MIA's leader United States Heavyweight Champion General Rection during Rection's title defense against Team Canada's Lance Storm. Duggan was the special guest enforcer for the match, and helped Storm in winning the match. During this time Duggan cut his hair short, shaved his trademark beard and sang "O Canada". At Halloween Havoc, Duggan and Storm teamed up against General Rection in a handicap match for Storm's United States Heavyweight Championship. Duggan missed an attack on Rection, which led to Rection pinning Duggan to win the match. Duggan continued to unintentionally cost Team Canada many of their victories, but he helped Storm to defeat The Cat in a match at Starrcade. After the match, Team Canada turned on Duggan, starting a feud.

At Sin, Duggan was the special guest referee in a Penalty Box match between Team Canada and the Filthy Animals. Despite Duggan's role as the referee, Team Canada won the match after Storm forced Kidman to submit.

=== NWA Total Nonstop Action (2003) ===
On the March 12, 2003 pay-per-view of NWA Total Nonstop Action (TNA), Duggan made a surprise appearance and defeated fellow WCW alumnus Mike Sanders. on the March 19 pay-per-view, Duggan and Moondog Spot defeated Mike Sanders and Disco Inferno. Duggan made his final appearance in TNA on October 29, 2003, losing to Jeff Jarrett.

=== International Wrestling Association of Japan (2004) ===
In April 2004, Duggan debuted in the International Wrestling Association of Japan. In May 2004 at the Mike Rotundo Retirement Show in Tokyo's Korakuen Hall, Duggan teamed with Animal Warrior and Keizo Matsuda in a loss to Barry Windham, Mike Rotundo, and Ryo Miyake, with Ted DiBiase as special guest referee.

In August 2004, Duggan took part in a one-night tournament held in Tokyo's Yoyogi National Stadium for the vacant IWA World Heavyweight Championship. After defeating Konga the Barbarian and Bruiser Kong, Duggan defeated Big Boss Man in the tournament finals to win the title; this marked the final match of Boss Man's career before his sudden death. In September 2004, Duggan successfully defended the title against Kong in the Korakuen Hall, marking his final match for IWA Japan. He later vacated the IWA World Heavyweight Championship.

=== World Wrestling Entertainment / WWE (2005–2009, 2011–2013) ===
==== Teaming with Eugene (2005) ====
Duggan returned to the World Wrestling Federation - since renamed World Wrestling Entertainment - on the October 3, 2005 edition of Raw, dubbed "The Homecoming" along with several other WWF/E alumni after a 12-year absence with the company. He and the other legends attacked Rob Conway after Conway came to the ring and insulted them. He was also one of the "legends" available for fans to select to team with Eugene in a match at Taboo Tuesday to face the team of Conway and Tyson Tomko (Jimmy Snuka was chosen instead of Duggan). He returned to WWE again after Royal Rumble, with a message from John Cena to Lita after Edge lost the WWE Championship: "HOOOOO!" Duggan and Edge began a short feud with each other which culminated in a match that occurred two weeks later on Raw, which Edge won after Lita provided a distraction.

After feuding with Edge and Lita, he became mentor and tutor to Eugene and the two feuded with The Spirit Squad. He began working on Heat, but also made a few appearances on Raw with Eugene and The Highlanders. On the November 6 edition of Raw, Duggan and Eugene faced the Spirit Squad in a match with the stipulation that the losing team would disband and never team up again. After Duggan was caught off guard after the other Spirit Squad members interfered and then pinned for the win, Eugene snapped and attacked Duggan. He started a feud with Eugene, and three weeks later, the two had a match with each other, which Eugene won.

==== Various appearances (2006–2009) ====
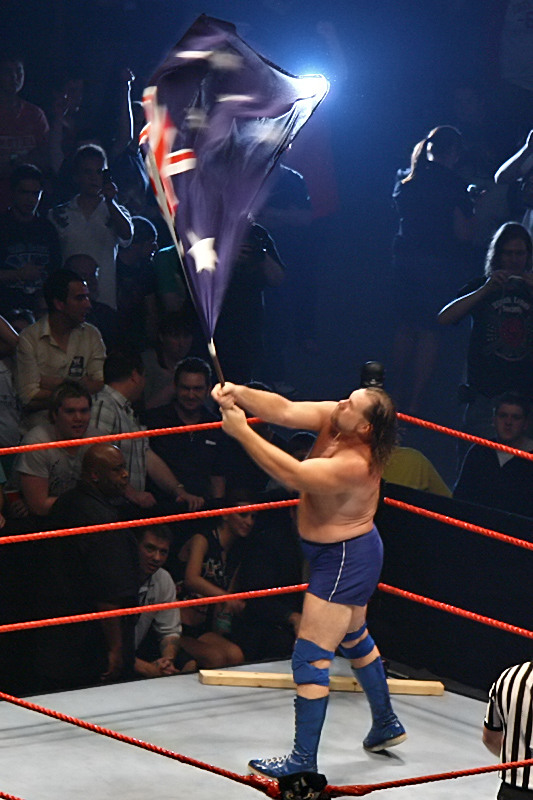
Duggan waving an Australian flag during his ring entrance in Australia, 2007, with his 2x4 in the corner

At New Year's Revolution in January 2007, Duggan teamed with Super Crazy in a tag team turmoil match to determine the number one contenders to the World Tag Team Championship, in a losing effort. On the January 15 edition of Raw, Duggan was dragged out by Rated-RKO (Edge and Randy Orton) and was beaten to a pulp. Edge and Orton feared Duggan would help out Shawn Michaels in a handicap match and wanted to set an example for anyone else backstage that wished to do the same. On the March 5 edition of Raw, he faced Chris Masters in a Masterlock Challenge, but was unable to break the hold.

After months of wrestling on Heat, Duggan returned to Raw in July, teaming up with The Sandman and feuding with Carlito and William Regal. The team ended when Duggan soon returned to Heat and Sandman was released. On the August 6 edition of Raw, he played The WWE Dating Game, a parody of The Dating Game, losing when Maria Kanellis chose Ron Simmons.

On December 31, he lost a 2008 Royal Rumble qualifying match to the returning Umaga. After that, he began primarily appearing on Heat once again, defeating locals and teaming with Super Crazy. On the March 17 episode of Raw, he participated in a 17-on-2 handicap elimination tag team match as part of the 17 members of the Raw roster against John Cena and Randy Orton. After Cody Rhodes was eliminated, all the remaining Raw wrestlers attacked Cena and Orton, resulting in their disqualification. Duggan also took part in a 12-on-12 tag team preview match on the March 25 episode of ECW. He competed in a 24-man battle royal held just before WrestleMania XXIV aired to determine the #1 contender for the ECW Championship. The match was eventually won by Kane.

In the summer of 2008, Duggan started a short feud with Cody Rhodes and Ted DiBiase after Rhodes and DiBiase tried to convince Duggan to retire and let the young talent run the show. Soon after, Duggan would come out and announce that he would take Rhodes and DiBiase's advice and retire, but Jerry Lawler stopped him by convincing Duggan to stay. Duggan and Lawler then wrestled Rhodes and DiBiase on the August 25, 2008 edition of Raw, but lost the match. On the October 20 edition of Raw, Duggan confronted Santino Marella and Beth Phoenix during one of Marella's tirades against his three possible opponents at Cyber Sunday (Roddy Piper, Goldust, and The Honky Tonk Man). Upset at being interrupted, Marella took off his clothes, getting ready to fight Duggan. Yet before a fight could begin, Marella instructed Phoenix to throw the clothes in Duggan's face, a move that temporarily distracted Duggan. Marella then smashed a guitar over Duggan's head, ending the segment. Duggan would appear on Raw's 800th episode during Kung Fu Naki's in-ring dance segment, which also involved various other members of the WWE roster.

In 2009, Duggan appeared in the 2009 Royal Rumble match, entering at #29 and setting a record for the most years between Royal Rumble appearances. He was eliminated by Big Show. On the August 10 episode of Raw, Sgt. Slaughter had him come out in place of Bret Hart after introducing "the best there is, the best there was and the best there ever will be", antagonizing the crowd of Canadians. This marked his final appearance with WWE until 2011.

==== WWE Hall of Famer (2011–2013) ====
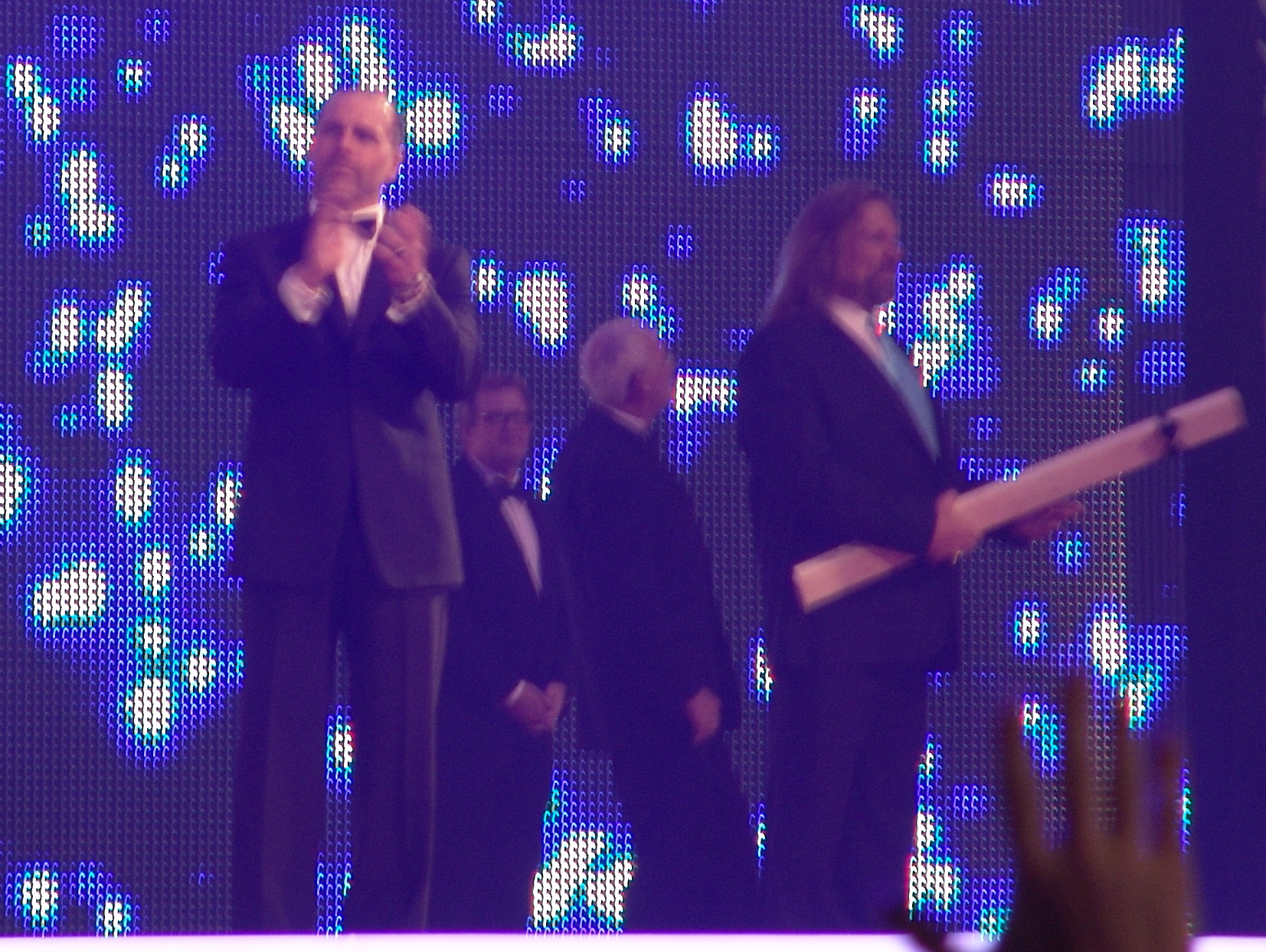
Duggan (right) being inducted into the WWE Hall of Fame in 2011

On April 2, 2011, Duggan was inducted into the WWE Hall of Fame by fellow inductee "The Million Dollar Man" Ted DiBiase. Duggan returned to wrestling in WWE with an appearance at the 2012 Royal Rumble and entered the Royal Rumble match as the #19 entrant and was eliminated by Cody Rhodes.

On the February 3, 2012 episode of SmackDown, Duggan teamed with Santino Marella in a losing effort against the WWE Tag Team Champions Primo and Epico. On April 10, 2012, Duggan made an appearance on SuperSmackDown LIVE: Blast from the Past, where he lost to Hunico by disqualification. Later that year, he appeared on the July 3 SuperSmackDown LIVE: The Great American Bash event, teaming with Sgt. Slaughter and Santino Marella to face Hunico, Camacho, and Drew McIntyre.

On the March 4, 2013 "Old School" episode of Raw, Duggan defeated Jack Swagger in what was his final match for WWE.

=== Late career (2013–2019) ===
Duggan in 2015

On November 30, 2013, at WrestleCade 2013, Duggan defeated Daivari. He signed on with Global Force Wrestling as a "legend" to help promote GFW events and tours. To promote the shows, GFW's Jeff Jarrett and Duggan have appeared at Dell Diamond on Thursday, May 28. January 2016, Duggan appeared in an event for Modern Vintage Wrestling in Wilmington, North Carolina. On July 17, he won the Danny Hodge Trophy Battle Royal at IWR OklaMania 2016.

On May 6, 2017, at AWF Head to the Edge, Duggan defeated Josh Price. Duggan continued to compete in various independent promotions all the way till 2019. His final match took place on May 12, 2019, at Destiny Sunday Night Power Slam in Ontario, Canada, where he was defeated by Gursinder Singh.

=== Retirement (2019–present) ===
In February 2025, Duggan revealed he signed a Legends contract with the WWE. He then made an appearance on SmackDown on July 25 during the tribute to Hulk Hogan.

On November 20, 2026, Duggan appeared in an in-ring segment on SmackDown alongside Cody Rhodes and CM Punk, where Punk announced that Duggan will join Team USA in the Team USA vs. Team Mexico 5-on-5 traditional Survivor Series elimination match at Survivor Series: WarGames. However, Duggan immediately declined after watching a scouting tape of Team Mexico.

== Other media ==
Duggan at Big Lick Comic Con 2026

It was announced in February 2012 that Duggan would appear on a WWE original reality show called WWE Legends House. The show premiered on the WWE Network on April 17, 2014.

Duggan worked alongside author Scott E. Williams to release his autobiography Hacksaw: The Jim Duggan Story in 2012. The book goes over both his wrestling career and personal life.

Duggan appears as himself in the film Pro Wrestlers vs Zombies, in which he battles the undead with his 2x4.

In 1991, Duggan appeared in the Harry and the Henderson's TV series' 16th episode.

In 1999, Duggan was a guest panelist for two episodes of the Nickelodeon children's game show Figure It Out.

Duggan appears in the sixth episode of the second season of GamesMaster in the UK, where he played WWF on the Super Nintendo against a boy he picked from the crowd, Hacksaw played as "Macho Man" Randy Savage and was beaten.

Duggan also appeared in the season five finale of Duck Dynasty.

Duggan and former WWF announcer Sean Mooney ran a weekly podcast on the MLW Radio Network called "Primetime with Hacksaw Jim Duggan and Sean Mooney". Duggan left the podcast after 18 episodes and Mooney is now hosting by himself.

Since 2016, Duggan has toured the US as apart of his "One Man Show" where he combines stand-up comedy and storytelling from his wrestling career.

In 2017, Duggan released the first issue of a biographical comic book miniseries through Squared Circle Comics, titled Hacksaw Jim Duggan. He also appeared in the Green Jellÿ single, Fr3tö F33t.

In 2022, rapper Estee Nack released the album Nacksaw Jim Duggan on the label Griselda Records, whose name, track titles and album cover are all inspired by Duggan. Track 1 "NACKMANCOLETRANE" features a snippet of Tucker Carlson reporting on Duggan defending his house from a home invader. Track 4 "ANGELDIOR" features vocals from Duggan himself.

=== Video games ===
Year	Game	Note
1987	MicroLeague Wrestling	Video game debut
1989	WWF Superstars	
1990	WWF WrestleMania Challenge	
1993	WWF Royal Rumble	
2002	Legends Of Wrestling II	
2004	Showdown: Legends Of Wrestling	
2009	WWE Legends Of WrestleMania	
2014	WWE SuperCard	Mobile game

== Personal life ==
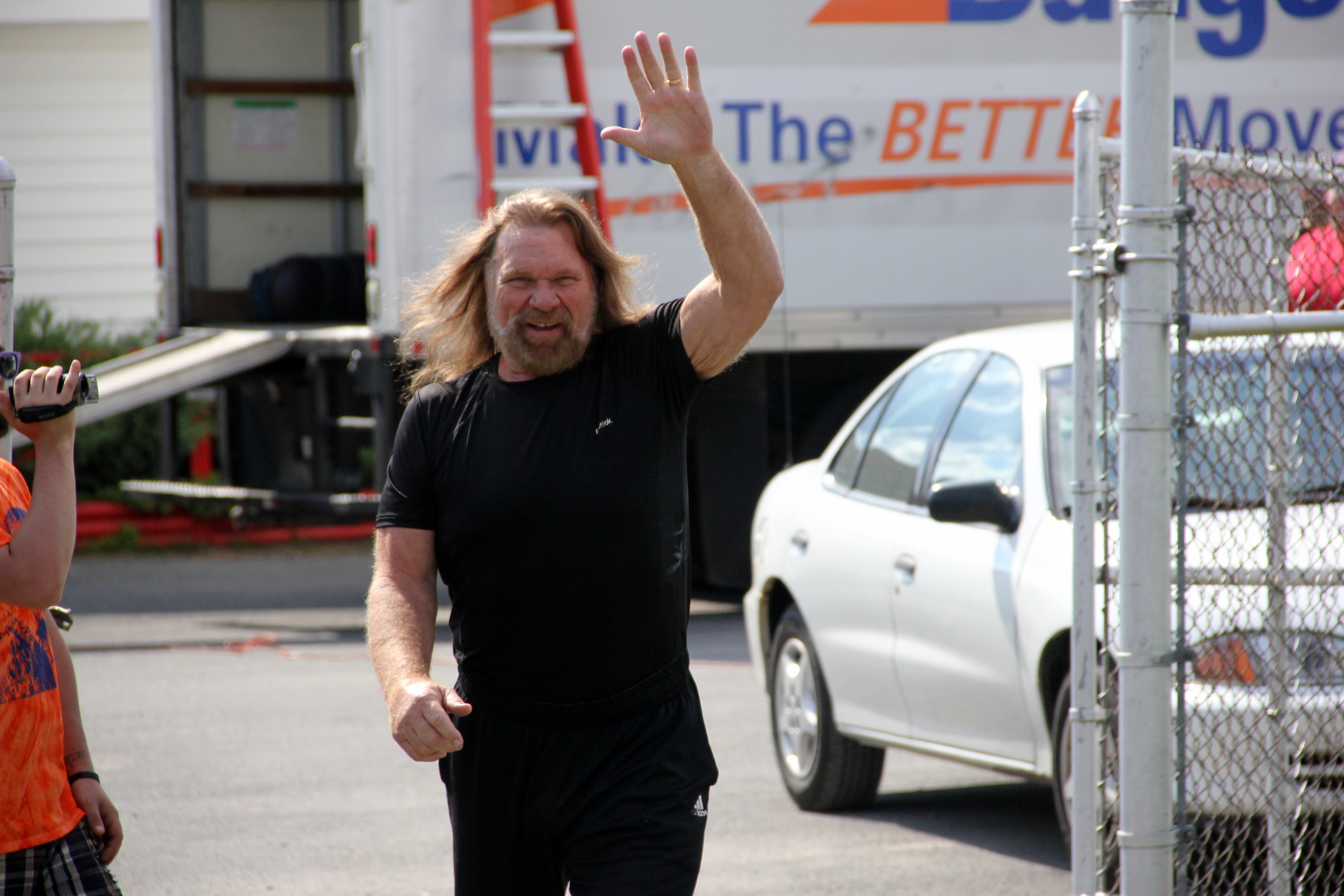
Duggan in 2013

Duggan and his wife Debra have two daughters, Celia and Rebecca. He is a close friend of Willie Robertson, who is president and CEO of Duck Commander.

In 1987, Duggan and The Iron Sheik (Khosrow Vaziri) were pulled over by New Jersey State Police before a WWF event, suspecting Duggan of driving under the influence. After a search of the vehicle and the persons, police discovered that Duggan was under the influence of marijuana and alcohol, while Vaziri was high on cocaine. Small amounts of cocaine were also found in the vehicle. Duggan received a conditional release while Vaziri was placed on probation for a year. Given the closely-guarded nature of kayfabe at the time, the scandal that erupted after two in-ring enemies were found drinking and doing drugs together led to the end of the angle, the Sheik's release, and Duggan's temporary departure from WWF. Duggan soon returned to wrestling.

=== Health issues ===
In November 2013, Duggan started an IndieGoGo campaign to cover the cost repairing his torn rotator cuff. Funding closed December 2013 and raised $10,396, well over the goal of $6,500.

In 2018, Duggan was admitted into the intensive care unit for a heart procedure to treat atrial fibrillation. In 2019, he had a pair of heart surgeries to fight infection. On October 20, 2021, his wife posted on Facebook: "Back where we don't want to be. Please pray for Jim and his doctors as he has emergency surgery this morning. Thank you, Debra." On October 28, 2021, Duggan announced via Instagram a week later that he was diagnosed with prostate cancer and had been living with it for a couple of months. This led to another surgery on October 29, 2021. "Jim's surgery went as planned. He is resting comfortably now. Thank you for your prayers, good vibes and well wishes. Please continue them as he continues to heal" his wife said. On December 8, 2021, Duggan announced in a video uploaded to his Twitter account that he was cancer-free. On May 15, 2022, he announced in a Facebook video that his cancer treatment continued, he would need hormone shots and radiation treatment for the next eight weeks, five days a week, and that doctors were optimistic about catching it early.

In December 2022, Duggan said he detained a home invader at gunpoint at his house in Kershaw County, South Carolina.

On September 8, 2023, Duggan was doing an autograph signing in his hometown of Glens Falls, NY, where he was being honored by the Glens Falls Firefighters Association for his work as a seasonal firefighter in the 1970s. During the signing, Duggan fell ill with a high temperature and severe pain. His wife and the fire chief suggested he go to Glens Falls Hospital where he was once again diagnosed with perirectal abscess with a high white blood cell count that was heading towards sepsis, Duggan said. Emergency surgery on September 9 was required to drain the abscess. Surgery went well for Duggan and on September 12 he announced on social media that he was being released from the hospital and allowed to fly home.

== Championships and accomplishments ==
=== Amateur wrestling ===
- New York State Public High School Athletic Association
  - Section 2 champion (1972, 1973) out of Glens Falls High School.
  - New York unlimited weight division state champion out of Glens Falls High School (1973)
- CNY Wrestling Hall of Fame
  - Class of 2015

=== Professional wrestling ===
- Heroes And Legends Wrestling
  - HLW Midwestern Championship (1 time)
- Imperial Wrestling Revolution
  - Danny Hodge Trophy (2016)
- International Wrestling Association of Japan
  - IWA World Heavyweight Championship
- International Wrestling Cartel
  - IWC Tag Team Championship (1 time) –with Scottie Gash
- Mid-South Wrestling / Universal Wrestling Federation
  - Mid-South Louisiana Heavyweight Championship (1 time, final)
  - Mid-South North American Heavyweight Championship (1 time, final)
  - Mid-South/UWF World Tag Team Championship (2 times), with Magnum T. A. and Terry Taylor
- Pro Wrestling Alabama
  - PWA Southern Tag Team Championship (1 time) –with Nigel Sherrod
- Pro Wrestling Illustrated
  - PWI ranked him #66 of the top 500 singles wrestlers in the PWI 500 in 1993
  - PWI ranked him #157 of the top 500 singles wrestlers of the "PWI Years" in 2003
- Pro Wrestling This Week
  - Wrestler of the Week (March 22–28, 1987)
- Professional Wrestling Hall of Fame
  - Class of 2018
- River City Wrestling
  - RCW Legends Championship (1 time)
- Texas All-Star Wrestling
  - TASW Heavyweight Championship (1 time)
- World Championship Wrestling
  - WCW World Television Championship (1 time, final)
  - WCW United States Heavyweight Championship (1 time)
- World Wrestling Federation / WWE
  - Royal Rumble (1988)
  - WWE Hall of Fame (Class of 2011)
  - Slammy Award (2 times)
    - Best Vocal Performance (1987)
    - Greatest Hit (1987)
- Wrestling Observer Newsletter
  - Most Improved (1982)
  - Feud of the Year (1985) vs. Ted DiBiase
  - Most Unimproved (1989)

=== Other honors ===
Capital Region Football Hall of Fame

- Class of 2010

Space Coast Sports Hall of Fame

- Class of 2025
