= W*ING World Tag Team Championship =

Professional wrestling tag team championship

Details
- Promotion: Wrestling International New Generations; International Wrestling Association
- Date established: July 1992
- Date retired: July 24, 2004

Other name
- IWA World Tag Team Championship
Statistics
- First champion: The Headhunters
- Final champions: Ryo Miyake and "Dr. Death" Steve Williams
- Most reigns: The Headhunters (4 reigns)
- Longest reign: Mr. Gannosuke and Tarzan Goto (390 days)
- Shortest reign: Tracy Smothers and Cactus Jack (4 days)

The W*ING World Tag Team Championship was a tag team championship contested in both Wrestling International New Generations and International Wrestling Association. The titles were established and won around July 1992 and were active until July 24, 2004, when they were abandoned. Ryo Miyake suffered an injury in the summer of 2004 and "Dr. Death" Steve Williams's throat cancer rapidly worsened during the same time frame, both being unable to defend the titles. There have been a total of 14 reigns shared between 11 different teams. Williams and Miyake were the last champions.

== Title history ==
Key
No.	Overall reign number
Reign	Reign number for the specific team—reign numbers for the individuals are in parentheses, if different
Days	Number of days held
<1	Reign lasted less than a day
+	Current reign is changing daily

No.	Champion	Championship change			Reign statistics		Notes	Ref.
No.	Champion	Date	Event	Location	Reign	Days	Notes	Ref.
Wrestling International New Generations
1	The Headhunters (Headhunter A and Headhunter B)	July 11, 1992	Best Champ	Yokohama, Japan	1	118	Defeated Dick Murdoch and Dick Slater in the finals of a tournament to determine the inaugural champions.	
2	Mr. Pogo and Crash The Terminator	November 6, 1992	House show	Sapporo, Japan	1	137		
—	Vacated	March 23, 1993	—	—	—	—	The titles were vacated due to Mr. Pogo not showing up to a title defense.	
3	Freddy Kruger and Leatherface	March 30, 1993	House show	Hakata, Japan	1	4	Defeated Crash The Terminator and Mitsuhiro Matsunaga in a decision match for the vacant titles.	
4	Mitsuhiro Matsunaga and Yukihiro Kanemura	April 3, 1993	House show	Kagoshima, Japan	1	6		
—	Vacated	April 9, 1993	—	—	—	—	The titles were vacated due to Matsunaga giving up the championship to fight Leatherface.	
5	The Headhunters (Headhunter A and Headhunter B)	May 9, 1993	House show	Honjō, Japan	2	316	Defeated Yukihiro Kanemura and Miguel Perez, Jr. in the finals of a four-team tournament to win the vacant titles.	
—	Deactivated	March 21, 1994	—	—	—	—	The titles were deactivated due to the Wrestling International New Generations promotion closure.	
International Wrestling Association
6	The Headhunters (Headhunter A and Headhunter B)	November 17, 1994	IWA Japan Texas Bronco New Coming	Yokohama, Japan	3	106	Defeated Dick Slater and Nobutaka Araya in 8-team round-robin tournament final to win the re-activated titles. The titles were renamed as the IWA World Tag Team Championship due to being revived by International Wrestling Association.	
7	Los Cowboys (Silver King and El Texano)	March 3, 1995	IWA Japan A Spring Breeze ~Condition Of Victory~	Hiroshima, Japan	1	170		
8	The Headhunters (Headhunter A and Headhunter B)	August 20, 1995	IWA Japan KAWASAKI DREAM - The Indie Dream	Kawasaki, Japan	4	40		
9	Cactus Jack and Tracy Smothers	September 29, 1995	IWA Japan DARKEST HOUR ~ A New Dawn ~	Yokohama, Japan	1	2		
10	Tarzan Goto and Mr. Gannosuke	October 1, 1995	IWA Japan DARKEST HOUR ~ A New Dawn ~	Akita, Japan	1	391	Also win NWA World Tag Team Championship on December 9, 1995, and defend titles simultaneously.	
—	Vacated	October 26, 1996	—	—	—	—	The titles were vacated after Tarzan Goto and Mr. Gannosuke left the promotion.	
11	The Faces of Death (Leatherface (2) and Jason the Terrible)	November 23, 1999	House show	Tokyo, Japan	1	782-886	Defeat Yoshiya Yamashita and The Shooter in an 8-team tournament final to win the vacant titles. Shooter was unmasked by Tarzan Goto, who ran in during the final as Katsutoshi Niiyama. Leatherface and Jason the Terrible were formerly known as Rick Patterson and Rafael Rodríguez. The length of this reign is uncertain as their last documented title defense was at an Lucha Libre AAA Worldwide event from January 12, 2002 where they defeated The Headhunters to retain the titles.	
—	Vacated	January 12 - April 26, 2002	—	—	—	—	The titles were vacated under unknown circumstances.	
12	Jun Izumida and Shoichi Ichimiya	April 26, 2002	House show	Tokyo, Japan	1	158	Defeated Keizo Matsuda and Takashi Uwano in a one-night tournament final to win the vacant titles.	
13	Keizo Matsuda and Takashi Uwano	October 1, 2002	House show	Tokyo, Japan	1	51		
—	Vacated	November 21, 2002	—	—	—	—	The titles were vacated after Uwano left the promotion.	
14	Steve Williams and Ryo Miyake	November 30, 2003	House show	Tokyo, Japan	1	234	Defeated Keizo Matsuda and Leatherface in six-team tournament final to win the vacant titles.	
—	Deactivated	July 21, 2004	—	—	—	—	The titles were deactivated and abandoned after Miyake suffered an injury and was unable to further defend the titles, as well as Williams's throat cancer quickly developing into Stage IV.	
