= José Estrada Jr. =

Puerto Rican wrestler (born 1973)

Personal information
- Born: August 25, 1973 (age 53) Brooklyn, New York, U.S.
- Parent: José Estrada Sr. (father)
- Relative: Rico Suave (brother)

Professional wrestling career
- Ring name(s): Super Medico III; Crypt Keeper; Foreign Exchange; Jose Estrada; Jose Estrada Jr. Halcón Negro; 18k El Vigilante
- Billed height: 6 ft 0 in (1.83 m)
- Billed weight: 269 lb (122 kg)
- Debut: 1990
- Retired: 1999

José Estrada Jr. (born August 25, 1973) is a Puerto Rican retired professional wrestler best known for his time in the World Wrestling Federation (WWF (now, WWE) as a member of Los Boricuas.

== Professional wrestling career ==
=== World Wrestling Council (1990–1997) ===
==== The Super Medicos ====
In the World Wrestling Council (WWC), Estrada was known as Super Medico III and teamed with his father José Estrada Sr. (Super Medico I) as the Super Medicos. The first won the WWC Caribbean Tag Team Championship from Rick Valentine and Eric Embry on November 10, 1990, before losing the title back to the team on December 15 of that year. They began their second reign on January 6, 1991, losing the title to Valentine and new partner Gran Mendoza 17 days later.

==== Singles competition ====
A few months later, Estrada—now known as Super Medic III—defeated American Scott Hall to win the WWC Caribbean Heavyweight Championship on April 20, 1991. He lost the title to Rod Price on July 6, 1991. Super Medic III regained the title from Price on July 13, before losing it to Fidel Sierra on August 3, 1991. Also, during his career, he worked in various promotions in Japan and Mexico such as Frontier Martial-Arts Wrestling, W*ING, IWA Japan, Universal Wrestling Association and Consejo Mundial de Lucha Libre.

=== World Wrestling Federation (1997–1999) ===
Estrada made his World Wrestling Federation (WWF) debut in June 1997 as a member of Savio Vega's Los Boricuas stable with Miguel Pérez Jr. and Jesús "Huracán" Castillo. They were mainly involved in angles with other stables including the Nation of Domination and the Disciples of Apocalypse (DoA). The feud with DoA was voted the Worst Feud of the Year by the Wrestling Observer Newsletter. During WrestleMania XIV's tag team Battle Royal, Los Boricuas engaged two teams (Savio and Miguel, and José and Jesús), fighting on Raw is War.

Vega left the group in July, but the remaining members still fought as a tag team on Raw and Shotgun Saturday Night until October 1998. Estrada was injured while facing Edge in the latter's television debut match on the June 22, 1998, episode of Raw is War. The incident was the result of a botched suicide senton, which led to Estrada being counted out shortly into the match. Los Boricuas competed on Super Astros until the show ended in August 1999 and all three left the company. Estrada retired from wrestling shortly after.

In February 2024, Los Bouricas teamed together for the first time in almost 25 years at an International Wrestling Association (IWA) event honouring four decades of Vega's career.

== Championships ==
- World Wrestling Council
  - WWC Caribbean Tag Team Championship (2 times) – with Super Medico I
  - WWC Caribbean Heavyweight Championship (2 times)
  - WWC World Tag Team Championship (4 times) – with Super Medico I (3) and Muhammed Hussein (1)
- Americas Wrestling Federation (Puerto Rico)
  - AWF World Tag Team Championship (3 times) – with 24 K
- Wrestling International New Generations
  - W*ING World Heavyweight Championship (2 times)
- Wrestling Observer Newsletter awards

- Worst Feud of the Year (1997) – vs. Disciples of Apocalypse

== See also ==
- Professional wrestling in Puerto Rico
