= International Wrestling Association of Japan =

Defunct Japanese professional wrestling promotion

- Acronym: IWA Japan
- Founded: 1994
- Defunct: 2014
- Style: Hardcore wrestling (early); Comedy wrestling and King's Road style (later)
- Headquarters: Japan
- Founder: Víctor Quiñones
- Owner: Tatsukuni Asano
- Predecessor: W*ING

The International Wrestling Association of Japan, also known as International Wrestling Association Japan (IWA Japan) and simply International Wrestling Association (IWA), was a Japanese professional wrestling promotion operating from 1994 to 2014.

== History ==
=== Early years ===
It was formed by Víctor Quiñones as a successor to the W*ING promotion, which was folding as a rival to Frontier Martial-Arts Wrestling (FMW), the pioneer of deathmatch wrestling in Japan and the only deathmatch promotion in Japan at the time. Most of the wrestlers jumped ship to Quiñones' new IWA Japan group. He found a sponsor in Tatsukuni "Kinroku" Asano, a businessman who owned several restaurants in Tokyo and had bought and run several wrestling shows prior to IWA Japan.

They had their first show in Yokosuka, Kanagawa on May 21, 1994, which was taped for television. The early shows often featured many ex-W*ING wrestlers like Yukihiro Kanemura, Shoji Nakamaki, Nobutaka Araya and The Headhunters. They also had fans to fill out questionnaires about the shows and sometimes gave away freebies. Quiñones booked talent from all over the world to compete in IWA, including Cactus Jack and Terry Funk who engaged in some of their most famous bouts.

=== Kawasaki Dream ===
With IWA getting more popular due to the charisma of some of their wrestlers, they decided to produce a show called Kawasaki Dream, which was held on August 20, 1995, at the Kawasaki Baseball Stadium. The main attraction of the show was the first ever 8-man single elimination deathmatch tournament, which featured Cactus Jack, Terry Funk, Shoji Nakamaki, Hiroshi Ono, Leatherface, Tiger Jeet Singh, Terry Gordy and former FMW wrestler Mr. Gannosuke. The show also featured an NWA World Heavyweight Championship defense, as Tarzan Goto challenged then-champion Dan Severn for the title.

=== Demise, mid 2000s resurgence and folding ===
Quiñones left IWA at the end of 1995, along with the NWA affiliation. Goto, Gannosuke, and Flying Kid Ichihara followed suit in late-1996 to join Tokyo Pro. Subsequently, IWA started to go downhill after losing much of the talent that Quiñones booked.

IWA experienced a resurgence in the mid 2000s when "Dr. Death" Steve Williams and Mike Rotunda, as well as other All Japan Pro Wrestling (AJPW) gaijins such as Johnny Smith, George Hines and Giant Kimala found work in IWA after AJPW was sold. By late 2003 IWA also had a television deal with Fighting Samurai TV, notable for previously airing its own version of AJPW TV before AJPW was sold. Various WWE Hall of Famers also worked regularly for IWA during this IWA TV period, including Big Bossman, "Hacksaw" Jim Duggan, and Barry Windham. The veterans would work in the main event along with the younger stars, becoming similar to TNA at the time.

Ted DiBiase as "The Million Dollar Man" was the on-screen general manager on the show, acting as a heel. Steve Williams and up and comer Ryo Miyake formed a babyface tag-team in late 2003, Williams becoming his mentor. They would defeat Leatherface and Keizo Matsuda for the vacant IWA World Tag Team Championship. An angle between Big Bossman and Steve Williams commenced in January 2004, where DiBiase hired Bossman to force fan favorite Williams into retirement for being "an AJPW invader", kayfabe being accused of taking the spotlight from the native IWA guys.

Mike Rotunda would take Williams side, Rotunda also teaming with Miyake. Rotunda would also find himself in an angle with Keizo Matsuda, who behaved as a young and cocky heel to the veteran babyface Rotunda.

Both angles were cut short, the first one due to Williams being diagnosed with throat cancer in March 2004 and the latter due to Rotunda's nagging injures, who ultimately decided to retire on May 5, 2004. Rotunda the day before retiring got his revenge on Matsuda, defeating him in singles competition. Instead of Williams, Bossman feuded with "Hacksaw" Jim Duggan, who defeated Bossman in a TV tournament for the IWA World Heavyweight Title on IWA's 10th anniversary episode. This would be Bossman's last match before he died a month later.

After an uptick in interest, IWA would find itself seriously struggling after its main prospects in Williams, Miyake, Rotunda and Bossman were no longer on TV due to uncontrollable circumstances. Miyake decided to retire in July 2004 when Williams's health further deteriorated. Miyake after ending his wrestling career has run a successful dog breeding business that is still active as of 2023. Bossman eventually died on September 22, 2004, and by 2005, Jim Duggan and George Hines left the promotion. Johnny Smith's much promoted debut on IWA TV never happened because he decided to retire due to injuries like Rotunda did.

IWA held a show dedicated to Steve Williams on October 15, 2004, which AJPW mainstay and "Four Pillars of Heaven" member Toshiaki Kawada main-evented the show in Williams's honor defeating Keizo Matsuda. Kawada also defeated Matsuda in the main event of the prior IWA 10th Anniversary Show on August 31, 2004. Despite Kawada's prominent appearances, a full-time contract was never signed due to struggling financials and major loss of talent.

Williams showed his electrolarynx for the first time publicly on the March 27, 2005 edition of IWA TV when his first bout of throat cancer recovery was showing improvement. This would be Williams's last mainstream wrestling TV appearance as he chose to pursue a lighter schedule on the independent circuit given his age and electrolarynx. After this appearance there were no AJPW or WWE wrestling veterans left on the roster to pave way for younger talents. This ultimately hurt the casual fan interest and arena attendance it quickly garnered in 2004 with AJPW's 2003 gaijin exodus, ex-WWE talent hires and Kawada's main event matches and promo appearances.

After nearly a decade of gradually declining interest the promotion folded on October 13, 2014, following its 20th anniversary event and the retirement of Asano.

== Championships ==
- IWA Triple Crown Championship
- IWA World Heavyweight Championship
- IWA World Tag Team Championship
- IWA World Junior Heavyweight Championship
- AJPW/IWA Women's World Championship
- AWF World Women's Championship
- W*ING World Heavyweight Championship

== Roster ==
- Natives: Great Kabuki, Tarzan Goto, Mr. Gannosuke, Yoshihiro Tajiri, Shoji Nakamaki, Nobutaka Araya, Daisuke Taue, Takashi Okano, Yoshiya Yamashita, Ryo Miyake, Keizo Matsuda, Flying Kid Ichihara, Mr. Pogo, Kintaro Kanemura, Hiroshi Ono, Kendo Nagasaki, Keisuke Yamada, Kenji Takana, Mitsunobu Kikuzawa, Takashi Ishikawa, Shigeo Okumura, Kishin Kawabata.
- Foreigners: Dick Slater, Terry Funk, Cactus Jack, Tracy Smothers, "Dr. Death" Steve Williams, "Hacksaw" Jim Duggan, The Headhunters (Headhunter A and Headhunter B), Big Buddah, Miguel Pérez Jr., Super Leather, Leatherface (Rick Patterson), The Iceman, Big Boss Man, The Crypt Keeper, Jason the Terrible (Rafel Moreno Jr.), Dennis Knight, New Jason the Terrible, Tiger Jeet Singh, Gran Sheik, Terry Gordy, Dan Severn, El Texano, Silver King, Doug Gilbert
- Attractions: Toshiaki Kawada, Satoshi Kojima, Kensuke Sasaki

== See also ==
- Professional wrestling in Japan
- List of professional wrestling promotions in Japan
- List of National Wrestling Alliance territories
- International Wrestling Association
- IWA Mid-South
