= Bill DeMott =

American professional wrestler (born 1966)

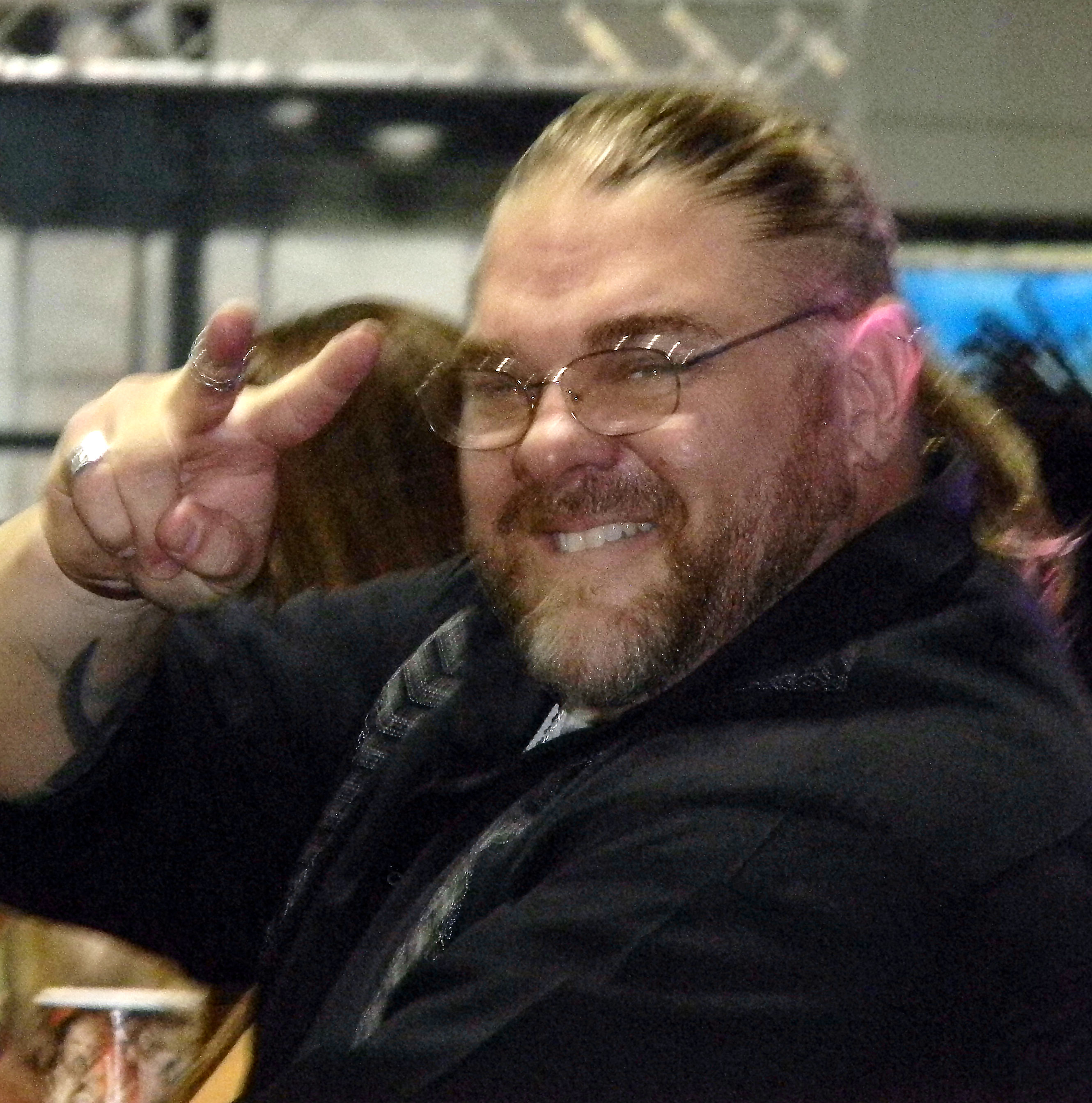
- DeMott in 2012

Personal information
- Born: William Charles DeMott II; November 10, 1966 (age 59) Ridgewood, New Jersey, U.S.
- Spouses: Rose Azzolino (m. 1987; ann. 2004) Lacey Storey (m. 2004)
- Children: 3

Professional wrestling career
- Ring name(s): Bill DeMott; Captain Hugh G. Rection; Crash the Terminator; General Hugh G. Rection; Hugh Morrus; The Laughing Man; The Man of Question; General E. Rection; Gen. Rection
- Billed height: 6 ft 2 in (1.88 m)
- Billed weight: 280 lb (130 kg)
- Billed from: Paramus, New Jersey
- Trained by: Johnny Rodz
- Debut: 1988
- Retired: 2010

William Charles DeMott II (born November 10, 1966) is an American retired professional wrestler, road agent, and trainer. He is best known for his appearances with World Championship Wrestling (WCW) as Hugh Morrus and World Wrestling Federation/Entertainment (WWF/E) under his real name. DeMott also performed as Crash the Terminator in both Eastern Championship Wrestling (ECW) and Japan.

Generally used as a jobber to the stars in WCW, he attained championship success during the promotion's dying days in late 2000 and early 2001, holding the WCW United States Heavyweight Championship twice. After an unsuccessful stint as a performer in WWE, DeMott retired from in-ring competition and transitioned into the role of a trainer for the company's Tough Enough program, on which he became known for using a rough, controversial style in handling trainees, as well as WWE's developmental territories Deep South Wrestling, Florida Championship Wrestling, and NXT; after working for WWE a total of 14 years between 2001 and 2015. In 2015, he resigned from his role in response to numerous allegations of misconduct in relation throughout his role as trainer in various WWE developmental territories.

== Early life ==
William Charles DeMott II was born on November 10, 1966, in Ridgewood, New Jersey. He grew up in Paramus, New Jersey, graduating from Paramus High School in 1983.

== Professional wrestling career ==
=== Early career (1988–1996) ===
DeMott was trained by Johnny Rodz in Rodz's New York City wrestling school beginning in 1988. From there he began working at small independent promotions using the name Big Sweet Williams. In 1992 DeMott began wrestling for the Americas Wrestling Federation and started using the name Crash the Terminator. Under this name he found partial success, first capturing the AWF World Heavyweight Title from Steve Strong in Puerto Rico, before moving on to the Japanese promotion W*ING and winning the World Tag Team Championship with Mr. Pogo. In 1993, while competing in W*ING, DeMott won a 16-man tournament to be crowned their World Heavyweight Champion.

On February 21, 1994 DeMott received a tryout match with the World Wrestling Federation at a Monday Night Raw taping at Poughkeepsie, New York. He competed in two other matches at a two day taping for WWF Superstars of Wrestling and Wrestling Challenge. He then went to Pennsylvania Championship Wrestling, where he won the latter promotion's World Heavyweight Championship upon winning a battle royal in 1995.

=== Eastern Championship Wrestling (1993–1994) ===
He wrestled for Eastern Championship Wrestling for a short time under his "Crash the Terminator" name. At Ultimate Jeopardy in March 1994 he defeated the Pitbull. His final ECW appearance came on May 13, 1994, in a TV victory against AJ Powers, which aired on June 7.

=== World Championship Wrestling (1995–2001) ===
==== Dungeon of Doom (1995–1998) ====
In 1995, DeMott was signed to a World Championship Wrestling (WCW) contract at the behest of Kevin Sullivan who had been impressed by him. He debuted in dark matches as The Man of Question and The Laughing Man, a strange gimmick that saw him wearing a singlet covered in question marks and laughing frequently. He made his television debut as a member of The Dungeon of Doom as "The Laughing Man" Hugh Morrus (a pun on the word humorous) on the November 18, 1995 episode of WCW Saturday Night in a vignette inside the Dungeon, where Kevin Sullivan told his (kayfabe) father, The Master, that he was giving him something he never had: laughter, and that he was giving him "the man from the Isle of Nowhere."

==== First Family (1997–2000) ====
Upon the dissolution of the Dungeon of Doom in mid-1997, Morrus was relegated to the undercard. He gained the distinction of being the first wrestler to compete and lose in a televised match to Bill Goldberg during the September 22, 1997 episode of Nitro.

As a part of the growing hardcore wrestling style in WCW, Morrus joined Jimmy Hart's First Family stable in 1998. Although the Family found success and received a push following a victory over their rivals The Revolution, the stable was suddenly disbanded in 1999. At this time, DeMott took some time off from WCW.

==== Misfits In Action (2000–2001) ====
DeMott returned in early 2000, utilizing the same name and ring attire, but squashing a number of wrestlers as an angrier version of himself. The angry Morrus gimmick came to a halt when Vince Russo and Eric Bischoff took over and aimed to take WCW in a new direction.

After getting on Russo's bad side (in kayfabe), Morrus was fired from his New Blood stable along with a number of other wrestlers. These ex-New Blood members (including Chavo Guerrero Jr. and Booker T) formed the comedic Misfits in Action stable, which saw its members adopt both military-themed names and attires. As the stable's leader, Morrus re-christened himself General Hugh G. Rection, and led the group in a feud against Filthy Animals.

The group's comedic nature and the workrate of some of the wrestlers made the group immediate favorites with fans. Upon the introduction of the heel Team Canada, the Misfits In Action immediately began feuding with Team Canada, based over the patriotism both stables had for their respective countries. As the leader of the Misfits, Rection feuded with Team Canada's leader and United States Heavyweight Champion Lance Storm, with the two trading wins until Rection defeated both Storm and a turncoat "Hacksaw" Jim Duggan in a handicap match on October 29 at Halloween Havoc to win the title. Rection would soon lose the title back to Storm on the November 13 episode of Nitro before defeating Storm to regain the title on November 26 at Mayhem.

After his feud with Storm, the next night on Nitro, DeMott stood in the ring and spoke to the fans. During this segment, the WCW locker room emptied and many wrestlers from backstage stood on the entrance way clapping for DeMott; Bill Goldberg grabbed the microphone and, fondly recalling his first opponent in WCW, said "Hey, Goldberg's streak had to start somewhere, my friend."

At Sin on January 14, 2001, Rection lost the United States Heavyweight Title to Shane Douglas. Following the title loss, the Misfits disbanded when Rection announced that they were honorably discharged, which led to Rection reverting to his Hugh Morrus name while the now former Misfits briefly feuded amongst each other. DeMott would then resume his pursuit of the United States Heavyweight Title until the World Wrestling Federation (WWF) bought out WCW.

=== World Wrestling Federation/Entertainment (2001–2008) ===
==== The Alliance (2001–2002) ====
When WCW was purchased by the WWF, DeMott signed a deal with the WWF and became part of The Invasion angle under his Hugh Morrus ring name as a member of The Alliance. Morrus made his WWF debut on the June 4, 2001 episode of Raw by attacking Edge. Aside from a pay-per-view match at Invasion on July 22 where he, Shawn Stasiak and Chris Kanyon defeated Big Show, Billy Gunn and Albert and an Intercontinental Championship match on the August 27 episode of Raw which he lost to Edge via disqualification, Morrus was relegated to wrestling on the company's secondary shows Heat and Jakked much like his fellow WCW alumni. In the September 29 episode of WWE Metal, Morrus made his first appearance at the show, where he took on Billy Gunn, in a losing effort. When The Invasion ended at Survivor Series following Team Alliance's loss to Team WWF, Morrus was kayfabe fired by Vince McMahon. While off television, Morrus performed at house shows and worked in company's developmental territory Heartland Wrestling Association (HWA). During his time in the HWA, he teamed with Raven to defeat Lance Cade and Steve Bradley to win the Tag Team Championship on March 12, 2002, which they lost only three days later to Cade and Bradley.

==== SmackDown! (2002–2004) ====
In April 2002, Morrus was drafted to the SmackDown! brand. He made his television return on the April 6 episode of Jakked alongside fellow WCW alumnus Chavo Guerrero Jr. and defeated The Hurricane and Funaki. Morrus was soon relegated to being a mainstay on Jakked and later Velocity until late July 2002, when he was legitimately injured in a motorcycle accident and had to take a leave of absence. During his time away, he became a trainer for the third season of Tough Enough, WWE's reality television show.

When he had sufficiently healed, Morrus made his return on the November 23 episode of Velocity under his real name. DeMott made his SmackDown! debut on December 5 as a heel, where he defeated Funaki in a squash match. The victory saw DeMott immediately receive a push that saw him squash several established wrestlers, including Funaki, Shannon Moore, Chuck Palumbo, Crash Holly, and Rikishi weekly on SmackDown!. However, this came to an end soon and saw DeMott relegated back to Velocity beginning in February 2003. In May, DeMott made a face turn that also saw him tell knock-knock jokes as part of the turn. As the gimmick failed to get over, he remained on Velocity while continuing to win several squash matches. DeMott wrestled his last televised match on the June 14 episode of Velocity, where he defeated fellow WCW alumnus Chris Kanyon. Later that month, DeMott retired from in-ring action, citing years of knee injuries. He then moved on to become the color commentator for Velocity, beginning on the November 1 episode, and remained in that position until December 11, 2004.

==== Deep South Wrestling (2004–2008) ====
When Tough Enough 4 wrapped production, DeMott did not make a return to Velocity. Instead, he became a full-time trainer for WWE and began working in the company's Deep South Wrestling developmental territory. DeMott also worked as a booker for DSW, although his direction in the promotion received criticism, most notably by former WWE developmental wrestler Kenny Omega, who soon requested to be released from his developmental contract due to poor treatment. DeMott was released from his WWE contract on January 19, 2007, with Tom Prichard taking his place as DSW's head trainer.

In March 2015, Devon Nicholson described an incident from 2006 that DeMott was involved with while he was head trainer for the WWE's Deep South Wrestling developmental territory. Nicholson described an incident in which Drew Hankinson was completely naked in the ring for a long period of time and gave naked stinkfaces to Zack Ryder and Melissa Coates while DeMott held jelly donuts over their faces. The wrestlers agreed to do this (with the other talent encouraging them) in order to get out of regular training for that day. DeMott refuted the notion that it was his idea, stating that the other trainees came up with because they wanted to skip the session.

=== Independent circuit (2007–2011) ===
After parting ways with WWE, DeMott competed for several independent promotions, including the Carolina Wrestling Association and the United Wrestling Federation. In addition to wrestling, he also began operating his own wrestling school called New Energy Wrestling School from 2009 to 2010 in McDonough, Georgia, while also running a brief series of wrestling events in Locust Grove, Georgia. Demott wrestled his last match in 2011.

=== Return to WWE (2011–2015) ===
==== Return as trainer (2011–2015) ====
In 2011, WWE announced that DeMott would return to the company to perform as the head trainer on the revived Tough Enough series. Following the conclusion of Tough Enough, DeMott replaced Tom Prichard as the head trainer for the Florida Championship Wrestling developmental territory on June 2, 2012. After FCW was rebranded into NXT, DeMott retained his position as the head trainer, and continued in that role when the WWE Performance Center was opened in 2013. He was featured as a trainer in the WWE 2K15 video game.

DeMott resigned from WWE on March 6, 2015 following multiple online wrestling news reports of accusations of misconduct and abuse by a dozen-plus former WWE trainees (see below) -- allegations DeMott defiantly denied.

==== Allegations of misconduct and departure (2015) ====
Several former FCW, DSW, and NXT employees previously working within or with the WWE developmental system made public allegations of misconduct by DeMott during his time as trainer, including accusing DeMott of making trainees perform dangerous drills, physically assaulting and bullying trainees, using homophobic and racial slurs amongst other derogatory terms, letting trainees train while naked, and condoning sexual harassment. These allegations were made by Kevin Matthews, Mike Bucci, Ivelisse Vélez, and Devon Nicholson in 2012, Chad Baxter and Chase Donovan in 2013, Curt Hawkins in 2014, as well as several wrestlers including Judas Devlin, Briley Pierce, Brandon Traven, Derrick Bateman, independent wrestler Terra Calaway, and Kenny Omega from late February to March 2015. Devlin and Traven stated they had submitted complaints to WWE management about DeMott in March 2013 when still WWE employees; they publicized those complaints in 2015. WWE released statements regarding some of the claims that came to light in 2013 and 2015, stating it had investigated the matter and had found no wrongdoing. Pierce questioned the thoroughness of WWE's investigations, saying WWE did not question him despite Pierce being one of the alleged victims. The allegations caused a strongly negative reaction on social media in March 2015, with the #FireDeMott hashtag trending on Twitter. On March 6, 2015, DeMott publicly denied the allegations on Twitter, but also announced his resignation from WWE "to avoid any embarrassment or damage" to the company.

During a May 2015 podcast with Vince Russo, Vélez asserted that her reporting DeMott's alleged misconduct in 2012 to WWE officials was the likely reason WWE released her (i.e., as retribution) shortly thereafter.

== Other media ==
DeMott voiced himself in the video game WWE 2K15. His character is a coach in the MyCareer mode.

== Filmography ==
Video game appearances
Year	Title	Role	Notes
2000	WCW Backstage Assault	Himself (as General Rection)	Video game debut

== Personal life ==
DeMott was married to his first wife from 1987 to 2004. Their daughter, Keri Anne DeMott, was killed in a collision with a drunk driver in 2015, prompting DeMott and his former wife to establish an organization dedicated to combating drunk driving.

DeMott married his second wife on December 18, 2004.

== Championships and accomplishments ==
- Americas Wrestling Federation (Puerto Rico)
  - AWF World Heavyweight Championship (1 time)
- Cauliflower Alley Club
  - Men's Wrestling Award (2012)
- Heartland Wrestling Association
  - HWA Tag Team Championship (1 time) – with Raven
- George Tragos/Lou Thesz Professional Wrestling Hall of Fame
  - Lou Thesz Award (2023)
- Pennsylvania Championship Wrestling
  - PCW Heavyweight Championship (1 time)
- Pro Wrestling Illustrated
  - Ranked No. 40 of the top 500 singles wrestlers in the PWI 500 in 2001
  - Ranked No. 450 of the top 500 singles wrestlers in the PWI 500 in 2003
- Wrestling International New Generations
  - W*ING World Heavyweight Championship (1 time)
  - W*ING World Tag Team Championship (1 time) – with Mr. Pogo
- World Championship Wrestling
  - WCW United States Heavyweight Championship (2 times)
