= W*ING =

Japanese professional wrestling promotion

Wrestling International New Generations
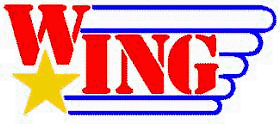
- Acronym: W*ING
- Founded: December 1, 1991
- Defunct: March 21, 1994
- Style: Hardcore wrestling
- Headquarters: Japan
- Founder(s): Kazuyoshi Osako; Mickey Ibaragi
- Successor: IWA Japan; World W*ING Spirit

Wrestling International New Generations (W*ING) was a Japanese professional wrestling promotion specialized in deathmatches.

== History ==
After leaving Frontier Martial-Arts Wrestling in the summer of 1991, Kazuyoshi Osako and Kiyoshi "Mickey" Ibaragi founded Wrestling International New Generations (W*ING), with Osako as president and Ibaragi as vice president. They would also lure away Mr. Pogo and Víctor Quiñones from FMW, taking away their number one heel and booker/talent exchanger.

Their first show took place on August 7, 1991, at the Korakuen Hall in Tokyo. W*ING would also have a talent exchange relationship with Puerto Rico-based World Wrestling Council, as well as sharing WWC's Caribbean Heavyweight and World Junior Heavyweight Championships between the two promotions. On March 21, 1994, W*ING closed due to the massive loss of money. Quinones would later form International Wrestling Association of Japan later that year.

== After W*ING ==
In 1994, former W*ING wrestlers Mr. Pogo, Mitsuhiro Matsunaga, Hideki Hosaka and Yukihiro Kanemura joined FMW and formed a W*ING Alliance, which had the motive of ending FMW as they held Atsushi Onita and his FMW responsible for ending W*ING. The W*ING storyline carried on for three years before the stable was forced to disband on September 28, 1997.

Since 1995, Ibaragi has held several one-off W*ING reunion shows until 2010.

Mr. Pogo formed an offshoot promotion in 2001 called World W*ING Spirit (WWS), which would last until his death on June 23, 2017.

== Notable W*ING alumni ==
=== Natives ===
- Mr. Pogo
- Yukihiro Kanemura/W*ING Kanemura
- Masayoshi Motegi
- Ryo Miyake
- Jado
- Gedo
- Hiroshi Ono
- Akitoshi Saito
- Koichiro Kimura
- Hideki Hosaka
- Kim Duk
- Kendo Nagasaki
- Etsuko Mita
- Manami Toyota
- Shizuka Minami
- Yumiko Hotta
- Aja Kong
- Akira Hokuto
- Kyoko Inoue
- The Great Sasuke
- Shunji Takano
- Super Delfin
- Taka Michinoku
- Terry Boy

=== Gaijin ===
==== United States ====
- Crash The Terminator
- Leatherface
- Freddy Kruger/Nightmare Freddie/Doug Gilbert
- Boogie Man/Eddie Gilbert
- The Headhunters
- Super Invader
- New Jason The Terrible
- Dick Murdoch
- Masked Superstar
- Wahoo McDaniel
- The Grappler #2
- Gypsy Joe
- Kevin Sullivan
- Giant Kimala
- Tom Prichard
- The Moondogs (Spot and Splat)
- Jimmy Backlund
- The Great Wojo
- The Texas Hangmen (Killer and Psycho)
- Scotty The Body
- Danny Davis
- Eric Embry
- Cheetah Kid
- Rip Rogers
- Rochester Roadblock
- Samoan Warrior
- Tazmaniac
- Vic Steamboat
- Bart Sawyer
- Brett Sawyer
- Killer Kyle
- The Bruise Brothers
- Iceberg |(Edward Chastain)

==== Canada ====
- Bash The Terminator
- Ivan Koloff
- Goliath El Gigante
- Iron Horse/Leatherface II

==== Mexico ====
- Mil Mascaras
- El Canek
- Dos Caras
- Zuleyma
- Martha Villalobos
- Fishman
- Super Muneco
- Super Raton
- Tinieblas
- Tinieblas, Jr.
- El Gran Sheik
- Arkangel de la Muerte
- Dr. Wagner, Jr.
- El Texano
- Francisco Flores
- Hopper King
- Miss Janeth
- Mascara Magica
- Silver King

==== Puerto Rico ====
- Jason The Terrible
- TNT
- The Iceman
- Miguel Perez, Jr.
- Carlos Jose Estrada/Super Medic I
- Víctor Quiñones (manager)
- Ray González
- The Crypt Keeper
- Cuban Assassin
- Huracan Castillo, Jr.
- Invader I
- Invader II
- Richie Santiago (El Boricua)

==== United Kingdom ====
- Pete Collins
- Bill Collins

==== Australia ====
- Bill Dundee

==== Africa ====
- Steve Simpson

== Championships ==
=== Championships exclusive to W*ING ===
- W*ING World Heavyweight Championship
- W*ING Pacific Northwest Heavyweight Championship
- W*ING World Tag Team Championship

=== Championships shared between W*ING and WWC ===
- W*ING/WWC Caribbean Heavyweight Championship
- W*ING/WWC World Junior Heavyweight Championship

== See also ==
- Professional wrestling in Japan
