= IWA World Heavyweight Championship (IWA Japan) =

Japanese wrestling championship

Details
- Promotion: International Wrestling Association of Japan (1994–2014); Gatoh Move Pro Wrestling (2014–2017)
- Date established: July 20, 1994
- Date retired: August 5, 2017

Other name
- IWA Triple Crown Championship
Statistics
- First champion: Doug Gilbert
- Final champion: Emi Sakura
- Most reigns: Emi Sakura (4 reigns)
- Longest reign: Doug Gilbert (455 days)
- Shortest reign: Emi Sakura (<1 day)

The IWA World Heavyweight Championship (Japanese: IWA世界ヘビー級王座, Hepburn: IWA Sekai Hebī-kyū Ōza) was a title used on the Japanese independent circuit. The title was the world heavyweight championship of the International Wrestling Association of Japan (IWA Japan). It was later revived in the women's wrestling promotion Gatoh Move Pro Wrestling, where it became part of the IWA Triple Crown Championship (Japanese: IWA三冠統一王座, Hepburn: IWA Sankan Tōitsu Ōza) with a separate reign history.

== Title history ==
=== IWA World Heavyweight Championship ===
Key
No.	Overall reign number
Reign	Reign number for the specific champion
Days	Number of days held
<1	Reign lasted less than a day

No.	Champion	Championship change			Reign statistics		Notes	Ref.
No.	Champion	Date	Event	Location	Reign	Days	Notes	Ref.
International Wrestling Association of Japan
1	Dick Slater	July 20, 1994	Who Is the Best	Iwate Prefecture, Japan	1	391	Defeated Nobutaka Araya to become the inaugural champion.	
—	Vacated	August 15, 1995	—	—	—	—	Vacated due to Slater leaving Japan to return to the United States because of his mother's illness.	
2	Tarzan Goto	August 15, 1995	Kawasaki★Dream: The Indie Dream	Yokkaichi, Japan	1	438	Defeated Leatherface to win the vacant title.	
—	Vacated	October 26, 1996	—	—	—	—	Vacated when Goto left the promotion.	
3	Doug Gilbert	January 13, 1998	House show	Tokyo, Japan	1	455	Won a 15-man Battle Royal Deathmatch by last eliminating Keisuke Yamada to win the vacant title.	
4	Ghost Face	April 13, 1999	House show	Tokyo, Japan	2	129	Previously held the title under the name Tarzan Goto. Reverted to this name on June 27, 1999.	
—	Vacated	August 20, 1999	—	—	—	—	Vacated due to unknown circumstances.	
5	Hacksaw Jim Duggan	August 31, 2004	IWA Japan 10th Anniversary Show	Tokyo, Japan	1	239	Defeated Big Boss Man in a six-man tournament final to win the vacant title.	
—	Vacated	April 27, 2005	—	—	—	—	Vacated due to unknown circumstances.	
6	Black Buffalo	July 2, 2009	House show	Tokyo, Japan	1	156	Defeated Keizo Matsuda to win the vacant championship.	
7	Keizo Matsuda	December 5, 2009	House show	Tokyo, Japan	1	531		
—	Vacated	May 20, 2011	—	—	—	—	Vacated when Matsuda left the promotion.	
—	Deactivated	July 30, 2011	—	—	—	—		
8	Emi Sakura	November 16, 2013	House show	Tokyo, Japan	1	<1	Defeated Kyonin Shihan to win the vacant title. This match was also contested for the AWF World Women's Championship and the IWA World Junior Heavyweight Championship.	
—	Unified	November 16, 2013	—	—	—	—	Unified with the AWF World Women's Championship and the IWA World Junior Heavyweight Championship to create the IWA Triple Crown Championship.	

=== IWA Triple Crown Championship ===
Key
No.	Overall reign number
Reign	Reign number for the specific champion
Days	Number of days held
Defenses	Number of successful defenses
<1	Reign lasted less than a day

No.	Champion	Championship change			Reign statistics			Notes	Ref.
No.	Champion	Date	Event	Location	Reign	Days	Defenses	Notes	Ref.
Gatoh Move Pro Wrestling
1	Emi Sakura	November 16, 2013	IWA Japan house show	Tokyo, Japan	1	41	0	Defeated Kyonin Shihan to unify the vacant IWA World Heavyweight Championship, the IWA World Junior Heavyweight Championship and the AWF World Women's Championship.	
2	Antonio Honda	December 27, 2013	Japan Tour #79: Last Itabashi Of 2013	Tokyo, Japan	1	29	0	This was an Ogiri Deathmatch.	
3	Emi Sakura	January 25, 2014	Japan Tour #87	Tokyo, Japan	2	197	2	This was a Wasabi Cream Deathmatch.	
4	Konaka Pahalwan	August 10, 2014	Japan Tour #122: Sakura 7 Days War	Tokyo, Japan	1	55	1		
5	Emi Sakura	October 4, 2014	Japan Tour #131	Tokyo, Japan	3	29	1		
6	Riho	November 2, 2014	Japan Tour #135: Thinking of Culture	Tokyo, Japan	1	323	4		
7	DJ Nira	September 21, 2015	Japan Tour #187: First Time in Yokohama	Tokyo, Japan	1	92	2		
8	Kaori Yoneyama	December 22, 2015	Japan Tour #202: Last Itabashi of 2015	Tokyo, Japan	1	183	1		
9	Riho	June 22, 2016	Riho 10th Anniversary: Flowers Blooming for 10 Years	Tokyo, Japan	2	150	0		
10	Makoto	November 19, 2016	Japan Tour #258	Tokyo, Japan	1	224	2		
—	Vacated	July 1, 2017	—	—	—	—	—	Vacated due to Makoto suffering a neck injury.	
11	Emi Sakura	August 5, 2017	Japan Tour #303	Nagoya, Japan	4	<1	0	Defeated Riho to win the vacant title.	
—	Deactivated	August 5, 2017	—	—	—	—	—	Sakura immediately retired the title and returned the belt to IWA Japan. Gatoh Move then introduced the Super Asia Championship to take its place.	

== See also ==
- International Wrestling Association of Japan
- Super Asia Championship
