= Japan Pro-Wrestling =

Japanese professional wrestling promotion

Japan Puroresu Japan Pro-Wrestling
- Founded: 1984
- Defunct: 1987
- Headquarters: Japan
- Founder(s): Riki Choshu
- Split from: New Japan Pro-Wrestling

Japan Puroresu (ジャパンプロレス) or Japan Pro-Wrestling was the first renegade professional wrestling promotion in Japan. It was formed by Riki Choshu and his Ishingun after leaving New Japan Pro-Wrestling in 1984. The promotion co-promoted with All Japan Pro Wrestling until 1987 when it dissolved.

== History ==
In August 1984, Riki Choshu had formed Ishin Gundan with Animal Hamaguchi, Isamu Teranishi, Yoshiaki Yatsu, Masa Saito and Kuniaki Kobayashi to feud with Antonio Inoki and New Japan Pro-Wrestling. However, just as the feud was heating up, tensions both in and out of the ring forced Ishingun and a few others to leave NJPW that September. The next month, they formed Japan Pro-Wrestling and also announced a co-promotion with All Japan Pro Wrestling. Masa Saito briefly went back to North America but returned to Japan in 1985 and joined in the new promotion.

In the beginning JPW promoted their own shows, but soon these began to be on-and-off. By the end of 1985, the entire active roster (excluding trainees and wrestlers on foreign circuits) were essentially AJPW wrestlers working on a separate contract, that of their promotion. While New Japan suffered from the lack of strong Japanese vs. Japanese feuds due to the loss of Choshu and Akira Maeda who led the Japanese UWF, All Japan enjoyed banner years as Choshu feuded with its luminaries Jumbo Tsuruta and Genichiro Tenryu, and Kobayashi feuded with the new version of Tiger Mask, Mitsuharu Misawa.

On March 23, 1987, Choshu and JPW announced the cancellation of the contract with AJPW. By the end of March 1987, Japan Pro-Wrestling dissolved, as some went back to NJPW, while some stayed with AJPW. AJPW championships were stripped off of the JPW stars that went back to NJPW. Hamaguchi chose to retire (he would return to wrestling in 1990) and Killer Khan, who had joined in 1985, would return to the WWF for a final run.

In 1995, Choshu reformed his Ishingun with Animal Hamaguchi, Isamu Teranishi, Yoshiaki Yatsu, and Masa Saito to briefly feud with Heisei Ishingun, which included Kuniaki Kobayashi.

In 2003, Choshu reformed Japan Pro-Wrestling in Fighting World of Japan Pro Wrestling, but after a year, due to financial issues with Kensuke Sasaki, evolved the promotion to Riki Pro and ran smaller scale shows, until Chōshu finally returned to NJPW in 2005 as booker.

== Alumni ==
- Riki Choshu (returned to NJPW)
- Masa Saito (returned to NJPW)
- Haruka Eigen (stayed with AJPW)
- Animal Hamaguchi (retired, returned to NJPW in 1990)
- Kuniaki Kobayashi (returned to NJPW)
- Isamu Teranishi (stayed with AJPW)
- Shinichi Nakano (stayed with AJPW)
- Killer Khan (returned to WWF, retired shortly thereafter)
- Yoshiaki Yatsu (stayed with AJPW)
- Fumihiro Niikura (hiatus after suffering a heart attack during excursion in North America, joined Pioneer Senshi as a freelancer)
- Norio Honaga (returned to NJPW)
- Shinji Sasazaki (returned to NJPW)
- Masanobu Kurisu (stayed with AJPW)
- Hiroshi Hase (was on an excursion in North America during his entire tenure, went to NJPW upon returning to Japan)
- Kensuke Sasaki (went to NJPW)
- Hidetoshi Yamamoto (retired)
- Tatsumi Kitahara (was a trainee, transferred to AJPW Dojo upon dissolving)
- Akira Taue (was a trainee, transferred to AJPW Dojo upon dissolving)

Tag Team and Stables

- Calgary Hurricanes (Super Strong Machine (returned to NJPW), Hiro Saito (returned to NJPW), and Shunji Takano (stayed with AJPW))

Kensuke Sasaki, Koki Kitahara and Super Strong Machine briefly returned to AJPW as freelancers in the mid-2000s.

== Championships and accomplishments ==
- All Asia Tag Team Championship – Hamaguchi (1), Teranishi (2), Honaga (1), Machine (1)
- NWA International Tag Team Championship – Chōshu (1), Yatsu (1)
- PWF World Heavyweight Championship – Chōshu (1)
- World Junior Heavyweight Championship – Hiro Saito (1), Kobayashi (1)
- NWA International Junior Heavyweight Championship – Kobayashi (1)

== See also ==
- Professional wrestling in Japan
