= List of WAR tournaments =

Wrestle Association R held a variety of tournaments competed for wrestlers that were part of their roster during the promotion's existence between 1992 and 2000.

== Sporadic tournaments ==
=== WAR World Six-Man Tag Team Championship Tournament (1994) ===
The tournament was held for the newly created WAR World Six-Man Tag Team Championship. The eight-team tournament took place on June 30, 1994.

=== Six Man Tag Team Tournament ===
A special six-man tag team tournament was held at the WAR 2nd Anniversary of Revolution on July 17, 1994.

=== WAR International Junior Heavyweight Championship Tournament ===
The tournament for the inaugural WAR International Junior Heavyweight Championship was held on March 26, 1995, at the Battle Angel event.

=== One Night Tag Team Tournament ===
The One Night Tag Team Tournament was an eight-team tournament held at Super Heavy-War event on December 8, 1995.

Quarterfinals
Nobukazu Hirai and Nobutaka Araya	Pin
Arashi and Osamu Tachihikari	10:07
Jado and Gedo	Pin
Koki Kitahara and Masaaki Mochizuki	11:06
Shinja and Typhoon	Countout
El Gigante and Koji Kitao	7:40
Genichiro Tenryu and Último Dragón	Pin
Hiromichi Fuyuki and Shinobu Kandori	12:21

Semifinals
Nobukazu Hirai and Nobutaka Araya	Pin
Jado and Gedo	11:12
Shinja and Typhoon	Pin
Genichiro Tenryu and Último Dragón	12:09

Finals
Jado and Gedo	Pin
Genichiro Tenryu and Último Dragón	8:13

=== Super J-Cup ===
The second edition of the interpromotional junior heavyweight tournament Super J-Cup was produced by WAR on December 13, 1995.

=== WAR International Junior Heavyweight Tag Team Championship Tournament (1996) ===
WAR held a tournament to crown the inaugural WAR International Junior Heavyweight Tag Team Champions on February 23, 1996.

=== WAR World Six-Man Tag Team Championship Tournament (1996) ===
A six-man tournament was held at the 4th Anniversary Show on July 20, 1996, to crown the new WAR World Six-Man Tag Team Champions after previous champions Fuyuki-Gun vacated the titles in June.

=== WAR International Junior Heavyweight Tag Team Championship Tournament (1997) ===
A tournament was held for the vacant WAR International Junior Heavyweight Tag Team Championship on November 24, 1997, after previous champions Tomohiro Ishii and Yuji Yasuraoka vacated the titles on October 18, 1997.

Semifinals
1	Hiroyoshi Kotsubo and Masakazu Fukuda
4	Battle Ranger and Lance Storm
3	Hidetomo Egawa and Masao Orihara
2	Tomohiro Ishii and Yuji Yasuraoka

Finals
Hiroyoshi Kotsubo and Masakazu Fukuda
Tomohiro Ishii and Yuji Yasuraoka

=== J-1 Heavyweight Championship Tournament ===
The tournament was held to crown the new J-1 Heavyweight Championship between November 18, 1997, and January 14, 1998.

Quarterfinals
WAR	Genichiro Tenryu
11/24/1997	Yoshiaki Fujiwara
WAR	Koki Kitahara
11/18/1997	Arashi
WAR	Nobutaka Araya
11/21/1997	Nobukazu Hirai

Semifinals
WAR	Genichiro Tenryu
12/24/1997	Mitsuharu Kitao
Umanosuke Ueda Benefit Show	Koki Kitahara
12/23/1997	Nobutaka Araya

Finals
WAR	Genichiro Tenryu
1/14/1998	Nobutaka Araya

=== Mixed Tag Team Tournament ===
The Mixed Tag Team Tournament was an interpromotional tag team tournament pitting male and female wrestlers from WAR and LLPW in mixed tag team matches. The tournament took place on September 27, 1998.

Quarterfinals
Yuji Yasuraoka and Yasha Kurenai
Masaaki Mochizuki and Harley Saito
Nobukazu Hirai and Noriyo Tateno
Jun Kikuchi and Miho Watabe
Genichiro Tenryu and Rumi Kazama
Nobutaka Araya and Shinobu Kandori
Tomohiro Ishii and Carol Midori
Koki Kitahara and Eagle Sawai

Semifinals
Yuji Yasuraoka and Yasha Kurenai
Nobukazu Hirai and Noriyo Tateno
Genichiro Tenryu and Rumi Kazama
Koki Kitahara and Eagle Sawai

Finals
Yuji Yasuraoka and Yasha Kurenai
Koki Kitahara and Eagle Sawai

== See also ==
- Professional wrestling tournament
