= Yoshiaki Yatsu =

Japanese professional wrestler, amateur wrestler and mixed martial artist

Personal information
- Born: July 19, 1956 (age 70) Oura, Gunma, Japan
- Martial arts career
- Nationality: Japanese
- Height: 1.85 m (6 ft 1 in)
- Weight: 120 kg (265 lb; 18 st 13 lb)
- Style: MMA; Wrestling

Sport
- Professional wrestling career
- Ring name(s): Yoshiaki Yatsu; N'Tollah Yatsu; Akiyoshi Tsuya; The Great Yatsu
- Billed height: 1.85 m (6 ft 1 in)
- Billed weight: 120 kg (265 lb)
- Trained by: Hiro Matsuda
- Debut: December 29, 1980
Medal record
Men's freestyle wrestling
Representing Japan
Asian Games
Gold medal – first place	1978 Bangkok	+100 kg

Yoshiaki Yatsu (谷津嘉章 Yatsu Yoshiaki, born July 19, 1956) is a Japanese semi-retired professional wrestler and amateur wrestler and former mixed martial artist. He is known for being one-half of the first-ever All Japan Pro Wrestling World Tag Team Champions with Jumbo Tsuruta, having won the NWA International Tag Team Championship and the PWF Tag Team Championship, and unifying the two titles.

== Amateur wrestling career ==
=== 1976 Summer Olympics ===
At the age of 20, Yatsu competed in freestyle wrestling at the 1976 Summer Olympics in Montreal. He did not place in the tournament.

=== 1980 Summer Olympics ===
He would have participated in the 1980 Summer Olympics in Moscow, but Japan chose to follow the American-led boycott.

=== Controversial IOC Banishment ===
In 1986 Yatsu took a hiatus from professional wrestling in order to one last time chase his Olympic dream. However, after winning a Japanese National Championship in the super heavyweight division in 1986 and while training for the 1987 Asian Wrestling Championships, the International Olympic Committee declared that Yatsu was a professional athlete and banned him from not only that competition, but also from the 1988 Summer Olympics. The decision stunned many people, but Yatsu didn't file an appeal.

=== Return ===
In July 2023, Yatsu, at nearly 67 years old, competed in the first-ever Adult Championships for the newly-formed Japan Para-Wrestling Federation. He lost to Yosuke Kamochi in the first round of the tournament.

== Professional wrestling career ==
=== World Wrestling Federation (1980–1981) ===
In 1980, after Japan decided not to send their athletes to take part in the Summer Olympics in Moscow, Yatsu garnered a great deal of national attention, when he announced his intention of becoming a professional wrestler. He made his debut for the United States-based World Wrestling Federation (WWF) in December 1980. After wrestling under his own name for several weeks, in February 1981 he began also occasionally wrestling under the ring name "The Great Yatsu". He left the WWF in October 1981.

=== New Japan Pro-Wrestling (1981–1984) ===
In November 1981, Yatsu joined New Japan Pro-Wrestling (NJPW), immediately forming a tag team with Riki Choshu and entering the 1981 MSG Tag League; they placed joint sixth with two points. In March 1982, he competed in the 1982 MSG Series, pacing eleventh with 13 points.

In October 1982, Yatsu returned to the United States, appearing with Mid-South Wrestling, Georgia Championship Wrestling, and Championship Wrestling from Florida. In January 1983, he joined the Texas-based World Class Championship Wrestling promotion, where the following month he defeated The Great Kabuki for the WCCW Television Championship. He lost the title to Iceman Parsons in March 1983. In April 1983, he defeated King Kong Bundy in a loser leaves town match. In June 1983 at Star Wars, Kamala defeated Yatsu, Armand Hussein, and Mike Bond in a handicap loser leaves town match, marking the end of Tatsu's run in Texas. In July 1983, he returned to Championship Wrestling from Florida, where he competed until returning to NJPW in October 1983.

Upon returning to NJPW, Yatsu joined Riki Choshu's villainous "Ishin Gundan" stable, feuding with faces such as Antonio Inoki, Kengo Kimura, and Tatsumi Fujinami. In April 1984, Ishin Gundan (Choshu, Yatsu, Animal Hamaguchi, Isamu Teranishi, and Kuniaki Kobayashi) lost to Inoki, Kimura, Fujinami Nobuhiko Takada, and Yoshiaki Fujiwara in the Kuramae Kokugikan in Tokyo. Yatsu left NJPW in September 1984.

=== All Japan Pro Wrestling (1984–1990) ===
In December 1984, Yatsu debuted in All Japan Pro Wrestling (AJPW) alongside Riki Choshu. Yatsu and Choshu reformed Ishin Gundan as a tag team, which would go on to win the NWA International Tag Team Championship. While Yatsu was training for his Olympic dream, Choshu left All Japan and returned to New Japan.

Upon his return to professional wrestling, Yatsu decided not to join his tag team partner in New Japan, but to stay in All Japan. Afterwards, All Japan broke up the tag team of Genichiro Tenryu and Jumbo Tsuruta and made Tsuruta Yatsu's new tag team partner. The tag team, known as "The Olympics", would go on to win the World Tag Team Championship five times, the PWF World Tag Team Championship once and in 1987 the team also won the World's Strongest Tag Determination League.

Yatsu left AJPW in July 1990.

=== Super World of Sports (1990–1992) ===
In September 1990, Yatsu joined the recently founded Super World of Sports (SWS) promotion. Upon his debut, he formed a tag team, "Dojo Geki", with Isao Takagi. In March 1991, at the "Wrestlefest in Tokyo Dome" event, Yatsu and Ishinriki defeated WWF wrestlers The Barbarian and Jimmy Snuka. The following month, at the "Wrestle Dream in Kobe" event, Yatsu unsuccessfully challenged WWF Champion Hulk Hogan.

In May 1991, Yatsu formed a new tag tram with King Haku. In February 1992, they won a tournament to become the inaugural SWS Tag Team Champions. They held the titles until April 1992, when they lost to George Takano and Shunji Takano. Later that month, they defeated John Tenta and Typhoon to win the titles for a second time. SWS closed in June 1992, leaving Yatsu and Haku as the final tag team champions.

=== Social Pro Wrestling Federation; retirement (1993–2003) ===
Following the closure of Super World of Sports, in 1993 Yatsu founded his own promotion, the Social Pro Wrestling Federation (SPWF). In additional to running the promotion, Yatsu also wrestled for it.

In 1994, Yatsu returned to New Japan to take part in the G1 Climax tournament.

Yatsu retired from wrestling in 2003, with the SPWF being taken over by Chojin Yusha G Valion. He later became the president of a transportation company.

=== Late career (2010, 2015–present) ===
On November 30, 2010, Yatsu returned to the professional wrestling ring to wrestle his retirement match. The match took place in front of 500 fans at Shinjuku Face in Tokyo, and saw Yatsu and Koji Ishinriki losing to Tatsumi Fujinami and Tiger Mask, when Yatsu submitted to Fujinami.

In September 2015, Yatsu came out of retirement once more to team with his son Teriyaki Yatsu and began competing for smaller promotions. In April 2019, he debuted for Dramatic Dream Team (DDT).

In 2021, nearly two years since he had his third leg amputated he returned to the ring as part of the 15-person gauntlet battle royal match at CyberFight's CyberFight Festival 2021. A month later, he won his first championship in nearly three decades, the KO-D 8-Man Tag Team Championship with Akito, Hiroshi Yamato and Keigo Nakamura.

== Mixed martial arts career ==
After spending multiple years out of the spotlight, Yatsu, aged 44, received a big money offer to fight for mixed martial arts promotion Pride Fighting Championships. On October 31, 2000, Yatsu faced Gary Goodridge in Osaka. Yatsu, who hadn't had any stand-up training at all and hadn't competed outside of professional wrestling in 13 years, was defeated at 8:58 in the first round. Despite being dominated, Yatsu received a standing ovation from the crowd due to the amount of damage he absorbed without quitting, even trying a leglock at a point. The two were booked in a rematch on September 24, 2001. Goodridge again dominated the fight, got Yatsu in a guillotine choke and asked for his corner to throw in the towel, which they did.

In December 2015, he became a supervisor for DEEP.

== Personal life ==
In 1991, at the age of 35, Yatsu was diagnosed with diabetes. On June 25, 2019, Yatsu underwent an operation to amputate his right leg below the knee, as bacteria had entered his bloodstream and his right toe was progressively necrotic.

== Championships and accomplishments ==
=== Amateur wrestling ===
- 1976 Japanese Olympic Trials - First place, 198 pounds
- 1978 Asian Games - First place, super heavyweight
- 1979 Asian Wrestling Championships - First place, 220 pounds
- 1979 Japanese National Championships - First place, super heavyweight
- 1980 Japanese Olympic Trials - First place, 220 pounds
- 1986 Japanese National Championships - First place, super heavyweight

=== Professional wrestling ===
- All Japan Pro Wrestling
  - NWA International Tag Team Championship (1 time) – with Riki Choshu
  - PWF World Tag Team Championship (1 time) – with Jumbo Tsuruta
  - World Tag Team Championship (5 times) – with Jumbo Tsuruta
  - World's Strongest Tag Determination League (1987) – with Jumbo Tsuruta
  - January 2 Korakuen Hall Heavyweight Battle Royal (1990)
- DDT Pro-Wrestling
  - KO-D 8-Man Tag Team Championship (1 time) – with Akito, Hiroshi Yamato and Keigo Nakamura
- International Wrestling Promotion
  - IWA World Tag Team Championship (1 time) – with Goro Tsurumi
- Pro Wrestling Illustrated
  - Ranked No. 291 of the top 500 singles wrestlers of the "PWI Years" in 2003
  - Ranked No. 17, and 31 of the 100 best tag team of the "PWI Years" with Riki Choshu and Jumbo Tsuruta, respectively, in 2003
- Super World of Sports
  - SWS Tag Team Championship (2 times) – with Haku
- Tokyo Sports
  - Best Tag Team Award (1989) – with Jumbo Tsuruta
  - Outstanding Performance Award (1986)
- World Class Championship Wrestling
  - WCCW Television Championship (1 time)

== Mixed martial arts record ==
Professional record breakdown
2 matches	0 wins	2 losses
By knockout	0	2

Res.	Record	Opponent	Method	Event	Date	Round	Time	Location	Notes
Loss	0-2	Gary Goodridge	TKO (corner stoppage)	Pride 16	September 24, 2001	1	3:03	Osaka, Japan	
Loss	0-1	Gary Goodridge	TKO (punches)	Pride 11 - Battle of the Rising Sun	October 31, 2000	1	8:58	Osaka, Japan	

== Submission grappling record ==
Result	Opponent	Method	Event	Date	Round	Time	Notes
Loss	(United States) Ricco Rodriguez	Points	ADCC 2001 +99 kg	2001			
