= Shunji Takano =

Japanese professional wrestler

Personal information
- Born: February 16, 1964 Kitakyushu, Fukuoka, Japan
- Family: George Takano (brother)

Professional wrestling career
- Ring names: Fujiyama; Giant Dos Caras; Giant Zebra; Great Zebra; Gulliver X; Kenzi Takano; Shunji Takano; Super Ninja
- Billed height: 201 cm (6 ft 7 in)
- Billed weight: 130 kg (287 lb)
- Debut: December 8, 1981

Shunji Takano (高野 俊二 Takano Shunji) (born February 16, 1964) is a Japanese retired professional wrestler and actor.

== Early life ==
Takano was born on February 16, 1964. His father was a lieutenant colonel who died while being considered for promotion to colonel, and was also an amateur heavyweight boxing champion who held an undefeated record in the Navy Far East heavyweight division.

== Professional wrestling career ==
=== New Japan Pro-Wrestling (1981–1982) ===
Takano made his professional wrestling debut for New Japan Pro-Wrestling (NJPW) on December 8, 1981, defeating Fumihiro Niikura. In early 1982, he was scouted by Muhammad Ali and briefly transferred to Kyoei Boxing Gym, which was affiliated with NJPW. After a scandal at the gym, he returned to NJPW but soon departed for Canada to wrestle for Stu Hart's Stampede Wrestling in Calgary.

=== Stampede Wrestling (1983–1984) ===
In April 1983, Takano began wrestling in Canada for Stu Hart's Calgary, Alberta-based Stampede Wrestling promotion. While in Stampede Wrestling, he occasionally teamed with fellow Japanese wrestler Mr. Hito. His regular opponents included Mike Shaw, Cuban Assassin, Great Gama, and Karl Moffat. In March 1984, Takano and Hito entered a tournament for the vacant Stampede Wrestling International Tag Team Championship, but lost to Danny Davis and Hubert Gallant in a qualifying match. He left Stampede Wrestling in September 1984.

=== New Japan Pro-Wrestling (1984–1985) ===
In October 1984, Takano returned to NJPW to help reinforce the Japanese roster following the departure of Riki Choshu and others. During this period, he scored victories over Bret Hart and Keiji Mutoh (later known as The Great Muta). He later formed the tag team “Calgary Hurricanes” with Hiro Saito, and also teamed with Junji Hirata, who would later become known as Super Strong Machine. Takano left NJPW in September 1985.

=== All Japan Pro Wrestling (1985–1986) ===
After leaving NJPW, Takano and the Calgary Hurricanes began working for All Japan Pro Wrestling (AJPW) in November 1985. The Calgary Hurricanes became the third major Japanese wrestler unit, following Jumbo Tsuruta’s group and Riki Choshu’s Ishingun. Veteran Killer Khan left Ishingun and joined the Calgary Hurricanes during this period. The unit continued feuding with other groups until September 1986, with Takano primarily competing in tag team and six-man tag matches.

=== American Wrestling Association (1986–1987) ===
In October 1986, Takano returned to the United States to wrestle for the American Wrestling Association (AWA). Managed by Larry Zbyszko, Takano wrestled under a mask as "Super Ninja" (also referred to as Super Dual Fuma Ninja). He won his nationally televised debut match on ESPN at the Showboat Sports Pavilion in Las Vegas. In January 1987, Takano challenged Nick Bockwinkel for the AWA World Heavyweight Championship, winning by disqualification. As Super Ninja, he also scored victories over Billy Robinson and Ray Stevens, rising to the top of the AWA rankings. He left the AWA in May 1987.

=== Pacific Northwest Wrestling (1987) ===
In May 1987, Takano moved to Portland to wrestle for Don Owen's Pacific Northwest Wrestling (PNW), continuing as Super Ninja. In July 1987, he won his first championship, the NWA Pacific Northwest Tag Team Championship, with Rip Oliver. They held the titles for about two months until Oliver left the territory, after which Joey Jackson became Takano's partner. Takano and Jackson held the titles for another two months before losing them due to interference by American Ninja (Brian Adams). He left PNW in December 1987.

=== All Japan Pro Wrestling (1988–1990) ===
Takano returned to AJPW in February 1988 to help strengthen the roster. On September 9, 1988, Takano and Shinichi Nakano defeated Footloose (Samson Fuyuki and Toshiaki Kawada) to win the All Asia Tag Team Championship. At the end of 1988, he teamed with John Tenta in the World's Strongest Tag Determination League.

=== Super World of Sports (1990–1992) ===
After leaving AJPW in the summer of 1990, Takano joined Super World of Sports (SWS) and formed Team Palestra. On October 18, 1990, he and his brother George Takano won their first main event together, defeating Genichiro Tenryu and The Great Kabuki.

On April 16, 1992, the brothers became SWS Heavyweight Tag Team Champions by defeating Olympic wrestler Yoshiaki Yatsu and King Haku, marking the first brother tag team championship in Japanese wrestling history.

SWS dissolved in June 1992 following internal scandals.

=== Late career (1992–1998) ===
In 1992, Takano joined the newly formed Network of Wrestling (NOW) as vice president, while his brother George was later dismissed from the promotion. At George's request, Takano resigned from NOW and co-founded Pro Wrestling Crusaders (PWC) with him.

While managing PWC, Takano also wrestled for several other promotions, including Social Progress Wrestling Federation (SPW), Wrestling International New Generations (W*ING), International Wrestling Association of Japan (IWA Japan), and Michinoku Pro Wrestling. PWC folded in 1994.

In 1996, Takano participated in an event at Kitazawa Town Hall that drew such a large crowd that police were called to manage the overflow of fans.

Takano retired in 1998.

== Acting career ==
Takano had roles in numerous Japanese movies such as Kentaro Amakusa in Sanshiro 1 and 2, Akira Aizen in Yakuza Sengoku Shi Fudo, Dick Head in The Defender and other features, being credited as Kenji "Ken" Takano, his "American" name. He also voiced characters in Japanese such as Gary Daniels in Rage from 1995 and Fatman in Spriggan from 1998.

Takano released a single named Ultra Bazooka (his wrestling nickname) through King Records in 1999.

== Championships and accomplishments ==
- All Japan Pro Wrestling
  - All Asia Tag Team Championship (1 time) – with Shinichi Nakano
  - World's Strongest Tag Determination League Fine Play Award (1988) – with John Tenta
- Pacific Northwest Wrestling
  - NWA Pacific Northwest Tag Team Championship (2 times) – with Rip Oliver (1 time) and Joey Jackson (1 time)
- Super World of Sports
  - SWS Tag Team Championship (1 time) – with George Takano
