= Haku (wrestler) =

Tongan professional wrestler (born 1959)

- King Tonga c. 1985

Personal information
- Born: Tonga ʻUliʻuli Fifita; February 10, 1959 (age 67) Nukuʻalofa, Kingdom of Tonga
- Spouse: Dorothy Koloamatangi (m. 1977)
- Children: 4, including Tonga Loa, Tama Tonga, and Talla Tonga
- Family: Bad Luck Fale (cousin, once removed); Steve Fifita (cousin); Tatafu Polota-Nau (cousin)

Professional wrestling career
- Ring name(s): Haku; King Haku; King Tonga; Monster; Face of Fear/Terror; Meng
- Billed height: 6 ft 1 in (185 cm)
- Billed weight: 275 lb (125 kg)
- Billed from: Tonga
- Trained by: Giant Baba
- Debut: 1978
- Retired: 2025

Tonga ʻUliʻuli Fifita (born February 10, 1959) is a Tongan professional wrestling manager, retired professional wrestler and former sumo wrestler (rikishi). As of July 2026, he is signed to WWE, where he performs on the SmackDown brand under the ring name Haku and is the on-screen manager of The MFTs tag-team, consisting of his sons Tama Tonga and Talla Tonga. He is best known for his appearances in the World Wrestling Federation (WWF, now WWE) and New Japan Pro-Wrestling (NJPW) under the ring name Haku and his appearances with World Championship Wrestling (WCW) as Meng.

Making his debut in 1978, Fifita also wrestled under the names King Tonga and King Haku while wrestling for the WWF. Fifita appeared on multiple pay-per-view events for the WWF and WCW and is a former WWF World Tag Team Champion.

== Sumo wrestling career ==
Growing up on the main island of the South Pacific island-kingdom of Tonga, Fifita attended Tonga College, where he played rugby union. At the age of 15, he was part of a group of six teenagers and young men sent by the King of Tonga, Tāufaʻāhau Tupou IV, to Japan to study sumo. Sione Vailahi, who would later become better known as pro-wrestler "The Barbarian", was also a part of this group. After moving to Japan in 1974, he competed under the shikona (sumo name) of Fukunoshima (福ノ島). He made his debut in November 1974 and reached the rank of Makushita 27. However, in 1975 the stablemaster who recruited him died, and he and the other five Tongan wrestlers got entangled in a dispute with his successor, which led to him being forced to retire by the Japan Sumo Association in 1976.

Fukunoshima Hiroshi
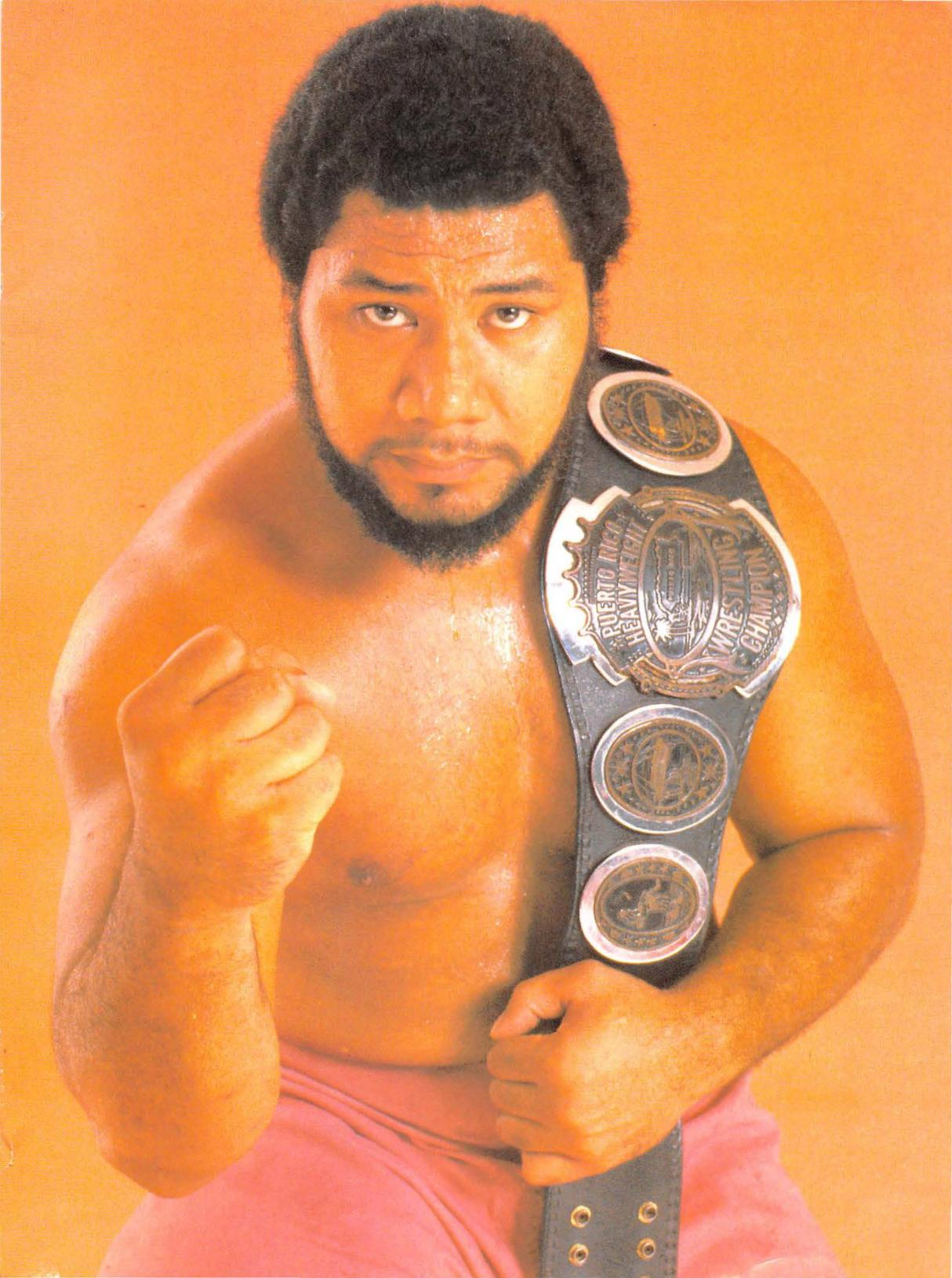

Personal information
- Native name: 福ノ島 裕士
- Height: 1.81 m (5 ft 11 1/2 in)
- Weight: 95 kg (209 lb)

Sport
- Sport: Sumo
- Retired: September 1976
- Heya: Asahiyama
- Record: 48-25-4
- Debut: November 1974
- Highest rank: Makushita 27 (September 1976)
- Updated on Aug. 2020

== Professional wrestling career ==
=== Early career (1978–1986) ===
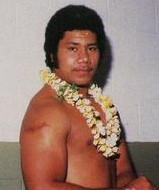
Prince Tonga in 1979

Under the guidance of two other former sumotori who had turned to puroresu, Genichiro Tenryu and Takashi Ishikawa, he joined their home promotion, All Japan Pro Wrestling. Early in his career, he also refereed matches in the Amarillo territory. Nevertheless, this merely served as a springboard for him to wrestle all over the world.

In the early 1980s, Fifita, taking the name King Tonga, wrestled in Canada for Frank Valois' Lutte Internationale promotion based in Montreal. The heel Tonga was managed by former wrestler Tarzan "The Boot" Tyler. Tonga feuded with the top stars of the promotion, including Dino Bravo. A face turn appeared to be in the offing, as Tonga interfered in a tag match, attacking Road Warrior Animal and Paul Ellering during a bout with Jos LeDuc and Jacques Rougeau Jr.. A miscommunication in another tag match with partner Butch Reed led to Reed and Tyler attacking Tonga. He worked in Puerto Rico for the World Wrestling Council where he feuded with Invader 1 and won many titles such as the WWC North American Tag Team Championship with El Gran Apolo, the WWC World Tag Team Championship with Hercules Ayala and the WWC Puerto Rico Heavyweight Championship. Tonga formed a team with his until-then rival Bravo, and the two became successful, including a win over The Road Warriors at the Montreal Forum.

=== World Wrestling Federation (1985–1992) ===
==== King Tonga (1985–1987) ====
Tonga debuted at a WWF Championship taping on 8/20/85 as King Tonga and wrestled as a "babyface".

In 1986 King Tonga became a star by body slamming Big John Studd on Championship Wrestling, though predictably Studd's manager Bobby "The Brain" Heenan did not pay him the US$15,000 he promised to anyone who could do so.

==== The Islanders (1986–1988) ====
Tonga made a name for himself as Haku in the WWF as half of "The Islanders" with Tama. Originally a fan-favorite team, the Islanders had mixed success, though they did win a $50,000 tag team Battle Royal at Madison Square Garden in October 1986. They turned heel in 1987 during a match on the WWF Superstars of Wrestling with The Can-Am Connection (Tom Zenk and Rick Martel). Earlier in the show, Heenan had announced he would have a new tag team that night and everyone thought he was going to introduce a new team to the WWF. Instead he showed up at ringside during the match where it became known his "new" team was in fact the Islanders. A feud thus broke out between the Islanders and the Connection; when Zenk left the WWF, Martel and replacement partner Tito Santana, as Strike Force continued the war, with the Islanders challenging Strike Force for the WWF World Tag Team Championship after the latter team won the belts. The team also had a classic feud with The British Bulldogs (Davey Boy Smith and Dynamite Kid) that was started when the Islanders, along with Heenan, kidnapped the Bulldogs' mascot, a bulldog named Matilda. Their feud ended after a six-man tag team match at WrestleMania IV, where the Islanders and Heenan (wearing an attack dog outfit), defeated the Bulldogs and Koko B. Ware when Heenan pinned Koko.

==== King Haku (1988–1989) ====
In 1988, following King Harley Race's legitimate stomach injury sustained in a match against Hulk Hogan, Haku was given Race's crown and robe and was rechristened King Haku during a coronation ceremony. In one of his first big matches after becoming King Haku, he faced Hogan with Miss Elizabeth in Hogan's corner on Saturday Night's Main Event in October 1988. He challenged Randy Savage for the WWF World Heavyweight Championship on 17 December at The Spectrum, but failed to win the title. However, he cemented his position as king by successfully defending his crown against the returning Race in a match at the 1989 Royal Rumble at The Summit in Houston. He later lost the crown to Hacksaw Jim Duggan who himself was crowned as "King Duggan".

==== Colossal Connection (1989–1990) ====
Haku would later go on to form the tag team known as the Colossal Connection with André the Giant and win the WWF Tag Team Championship from Demolition on 30 December edition of Superstars (taped on 13 December). The team was formed largely due to André's ongoing poor health caused by his Gigantism and the tag-team was a way to prolong his career while also giving Haku a story line. Haku and André lost the titles at WrestleMania VI, when Demolition defeated the Colossal Connection to regain the titles. Haku never legally tagged Andre into the match (due to André's poor health). Late in the match André attempted to interfere, but Haku accidentally struck him with a savate kick which left André tied in the ropes (according to Bobby Heenan, being tied in the ropes was one of André's favorite 'spots' as it gave the opposition some offence against him while at the same time giving him a 1–2 minute rest); Haku was pinned shortly after this. The team's manager, Bobby "The Brain" Heenan, blamed André for the loss and even slapped the Giant, who retaliated by "paint-brushing" Heenan. Haku tried to ambush André; however, The Giant blocked Haku's kick and struck him repeatedly, causing Haku to flee the ring where he and Heenan tried to leave by the ring cart but were caught before it left by the Giant who forced both off the cart before riding the cart alone to a standing ovation from the 67,678 strong crowd. André's face turn meant that the team had split.

==== Various feuds, teaming with Barbarian and departure (1990–1992) ====
Just after WrestleMania, Haku became the first wrestler to challenge the new WWF champion, The Ultimate Warrior, but he lost the match. Later that month he was programmed into a house show program with Hercules. On a match that aired on 8 June 1990 MSG Network, Hercules defeated Haku. In matches through April and May, the former Heenan family member won most of his matches against Haku. In the summer of 1990 Haku transitioned to an opening card wrestler on the house show circuit. He was victorious against the returning Brady Boone, Jim Brunzell, Barry O, and the newly arrived Shane Douglas. After being left off of SummerSlam 90, Haku was first to be granted a series of matches against new Intercontinental Champion Kerry Von Erich in a series of house show matches in September. Winless in these matches, he then became part of the Heenan Family feud against The Big Boss Man and participated in the 1990 Survivor Series. Again winless, he moved on that fall to feud with the newly returned Davey Boy Smith. Haku ended the year mired in a lengthy losing streak.

In early 1991 he formed a tag team shortly after this with fellow Heenan Family member The Barbarian. Their most notable match was a defeat in the opening match of WrestleMania VII against The Rockers (Shawn Michaels and Marty Jannetty). The team was short lived and Haku returned to singles competition, facing the newly returned Ricky Steamboat on house shows the spring of 1991. In the summer of 1991 Haku began to appear in Super World Sports in Japan for joint WWF/SWS cards. Shortly after competing in the Royal Rumble in 1992, Haku left the WWF to compete exclusively in SWS.

=== Japan and Mexico (1992–1994) ===
Coming towards the end of Fifita's WWF career, he would wrestle under the name King Haku for Japanese promotion Super World of Sports. On 14 February 1992, Haku and Yoshiaki Yatsu became the first SWS Tag Team Champions. They lost the championship on 16 April when they lost them to George and Shunji Takano but would regain them on 18 April, holding them until 19 June when SWS closed. With SWS closing, King Haku wrestled for Consejo Mundial de Lucha Libre in Mexico and New Japan Pro-Wrestling and Wrestle Association R in Japan, before finally joining World Championship Wrestling.

=== World Championship Wrestling (1994–2001) ===
==== Col. Robert Parker's bodyguard (1994–1995) ====
Fifita joined WCW in 1994, under the new ring name Meng, because the name Haku was trademarked by the WWF. Fifita made his surprise WCW debut on the 28 May 1994 episode of Saturday Night, as the mysterious and intimidating bodyguard of Col. Robert Parker, wearing business suits and shades while maintaining a quiet demeanor. He would accompany Parker whenever Parker's wrestlers of the Stud Stable competed in matches. His last night as a bodyguard was at the SuperBrawl V pay-per-view event on 19 February 1995, where Stud Stable member Bunkhouse Buck lost to Jim Duggan. Meng attacked Duggan after the match. Later in the event, when Blacktop Bully was scheduled to wrestle Dustin Rhodes, WCW Commissioner Nick Bockwinkel came out and escorted Meng back to the dressing room because of the attack on Duggan earlier in the show. The next week, Col. Parker announced that Meng would no longer be a bodyguard, but would be a wrestler from then onwards, winning his first match against a local competitor with one fast high kick. Meng began feuding with Duggan, leading to a martial arts match between the two at Uncensored, which Meng won.

Shortly after, Meng began feuding with Road Warrior Hawk, wrestling him to a double count-out at Slamboree. After the event, Meng participated in a tournament for the vacated United States Heavyweight Championship. He defeated Marcus Alexander Bagwell and Flyin' Brian in the tournament to advance to the tournament final against Sting at The Great American Bash, which Meng lost. In the summer of 1995, Meng formed an alliance with Parker's newest client Kurasawa and feuded with Sting and Road Warrior Hawk, losing to them at Clash of the Champions XXXI.

He would soon become known as "The Monster" Meng. He was touted as being a former bodyguard to the Emperor of Japan. Meng's finishing maneuver was the Tongan Death Grip, a nerve grip on the Adam's apple applied to a standing victim who would drop into a supine position.

==== Dungeon of Doom and Faces of Fear (1995–1997) ====
In August 1995, Meng quietly dropped Parker as his manager and joined the Dungeon of Doom to feud with Hulk Hogan. At Fall Brawl '95: War Games, Meng teamed with Dungeon of Doom members Kamala, The Shark and Zodiac to take on Hogan, Randy Savage, Sting and Lex Luger in a WarGames match, which Dungeon of Doom lost. The faction continued to feud with Hogan and his allies throughout the next few months. In November, Meng participated in the first-ever three-ring, sixty-man World War 3 battle royal at the namesake event for the vacant WCW World Heavyweight Championship. Savage won the match. On the 27 January 1996 episode of Saturday Night, Meng unsuccessfully challenged Johnny B. Badd for the WCW World Television Championship.

Two nights later, on the 29 January episode of WCW Monday Nitro, Meng formed a tag team with Dungeon's newest recruit, the Barbarian, called the Faces of Fear, managed by Jimmy Hart. The Faces of Fear lost to the Road Warriors in their debut match. At Uncensored, Dungeon of Doom lost to Hulk Hogan and Randy Savage in a Doomsday Cage match. At Slamboree, Meng was randomly paired with Dungeon teammate Hugh Morrus against tag team partner Barbarian and Diamond Dallas Page in the Lethal Lottery tournament to qualify for the Battlebowl battle royal. Meng and Morrus lost the match.

Faces of Fear branched out as a tag team after the rivalry with Hulk Hogan ended. They unsuccessfully challenged Sting and Lex Luger for the World Tag Team Championship on the 20 May episode of Nitro. Faces of Fear continued to team in WCW's tag team division while also teaming with their Dungeon teammates in various eight-man tag team matches. After losing to Chris Benoit and Steve McMichael at Halloween Havoc, Faces of Fear began pursuing the WCW World Tag Team Championship. At World War 3, Faces of Fear unsuccessfully challenged The Outsiders (Scott Hall and Kevin Nash) for the titles in a triangle match, also involving the Nasty Boys (Brian Knobbs and Jerry Sags). Faces of Fear received another title shot against Outsiders at Starrcade but lost again.

==== Hardcore Champion (1997–2001) ====
Meng spent much of 1997 facing lower and mid-card performers before starting a small winning streak in the summer of 1998. This led to a main event WCW World Championship match with Bill Goldberg on 10 August edition of Monday Nitro. Goldberg, too, had an impressive winning streak. Goldberg won and retained his title that night and thus added another wrestler in his winning streak, making it 160–0. Prior to this, Meng had faced Goldberg (before he won the World Championship) on WCW Saturday Night and despite the loss had pushed Goldberg for longer than anyone had until that point. In the spring of 1999, when Ric Flair was the (kayfabe) president on WCW programming, the barbaric Meng would often annihilate Flair's enemies per his instructions. Later on, Meng had a short-lived feud with Sting and occasionally faced top stars like Lex Luger and WCW Champion Bret Hart. He also participated in matches for the newly introduced WCW Hardcore Championship toward the end of 1999. Meng finally won the title at the Sin pay-per-view on 14 January 2001. He became the final WCW Hardcore Champion. A week later, he left WCW just two months before it was bought by WWF in March 2001.

=== Independent circuit (2000–2005, 2008-2016) ===
Fifita, under the name Meng, wrestled for World League Wrestling winning the WLW Heavyweight Championship on two occasions in 2000. He would return in 2003 to win the championship for the third time. Since 2005, Fifita has been essentially retired, returning to the wrestling ring on a few occasions over the years. In 2009, as King Haku, he would wrestle regularly for World Xtreme Wrestling where he won the WXW Hardcore Championship twice. He would return to semi retirement after his stint. Meng appeared at Chikara's King of Trios 2012 tournament, held on 14–16 September in Easton, Pennsylvania, teaming with The Barbarian and The Warlord under the team name the Faces of Pain. On 14 September, the team was eliminated from the tournament in the first round by Team ROH (Mike Bennett and Matt Jackson and Nick Jackson).

=== Return to WWF (2001–2002) ===
One week after Sin, Fifita returned to the WWF as Haku and made a surprise appearance at the 2001 Royal Rumble. After the Rumble, he formed a tag team with Rikishi, but the team did not last long due to Rikishi suffering an injury. Haku was left to wrestle on the lower card shows like Sunday Night Heat. His final TV taping was against Shawn Stasiak on a WWF Jakked/Metal taping in Buffalo, New York on 23 July 2001 which Stasiak won. Haku would work in WWF's developmental territory Heartland Wrestling Association. Haku's last matches were against WWF European Champion Diamond Dallas Page at house shows in February and March 2002 losing all of them in Texas, New Mexico, Japan, Singapore and Malaysia. He was eventually released from the WWF in April 2002.

=== Return to NJPW (2016–2018) ===
On 4 January 2016, Fifita, as King Haku, made a surprise return to New Japan Pro-Wrestling, taking part in the New Japan Rumble on the Wrestle Kingdom 10 pre-show. During the appearance he represented his son Tama Tonga's Bullet Club stable. He was eliminated from the match after submitting to Hiroyoshi Tenzan. The following day, Haku teamed with his son and fellow Bullet Club members Doc Gallows, Karl Anderson and Yujiro Takahashi in a ten-man tag team match, where they defeated Hiroyoshi Tenzan, Kushida, Satoshi Kojima, Togi Makabe and Tomoaki Honma. Haku next appeared at NJPW's G1 Special in USA on 2 July 2017, alongside his sons when they teamed with stablemate Hangman Page.

Haku, once again representing Bullet Club, returned at the G1 Special in San Francisco. He, alongside Tama Tonga, Tanga Loa, Yujiro Takahashi and Chase Owens defeated Chaos members Yoshi-Hashi, Gedo, Rocky Romero, Yoh and Sho, after making Gedo submit to the Tongan Death Grip. Later that night, Haku appeared with Tama Tonga and Tanga Loa after Kenny Omega successfully defended the IWGP Heavyweight Championship against Cody. They initially congratulated Omega, but suddenly turned and attacked Omega and the Young Bucks as they were celebrating on the ramp while wearing T-shirts referring to themselves as the "BC Firing Squad". After dragging Omega and the Young Bucks back to the ring to attack them further, fellow Bullet Club members Hangman Page, Marty Scurll, Yujiro Takahashi, and Chase Owens all attempted to come to The Elite's defence, but were summarily beaten down. The Firing Squad attempted to make peace with Cody, but Cody refused, and was also attacked. Haku then delivered a piledriver to Omega onto a steel chair, leaving the Firing Squad standing tall at the end as they declared themselves to be the real Bullet Club.

=== All Elite Wrestling (2021) ===
On 28 July 2021, Haku made a surprise appearance at All Elite Wrestling's (AEW) Fight for the Fallen event where he accompanied his son Hikuleo to the ring for his IWGP United States Heavyweight Championship match, where he faced Lance Archer in a losing effort.

=== Second return to WWE (2025–present) ===
In 2025 and 2026, Haku made several appearances for WWE, notably at 2025 Hall of Fame, WrestleMania 41 to congratulate Jacob Fatu on winning the WWE United States Championship and at John Cena's retirement match at Saturday Night's Main Event XLII. Haku, alongside Arn Anderson and Warlord, inducted Demolition into the 2026 Hall of Fame on 17 April 2026. In July 2026, Haku began managing his sons Tama Tonga and Talla Tonga, known as The MFTs.

== Personal life ==
Fifita is married to Dorothy Koloamatangi with whom he has a daughter, Vika; a son, Tevita, who is also a wrestler; and two adopted sons, Alipate and Taula. His son Tevita played football as a defensive end for the University of Texas at El Paso and was on the WWE roster from 2009 until 2014, as Camacho, and was also known as Micah in Total Nonstop Action Wrestling. Tevita currently wrestles as Tonga Loa, Alipate as Tama Tonga, and Taula as Talla Tonga all in WWE. Among Fifita's cousins are former Miami Dolphins defensive tackle Steve Fifita and Australian Wallabies rugby international player Tatafu Polota-Nau. Fifita made a cameo appearance in the 1978 Sylvester Stallone movie Paradise Alley along with many other professional wrestlers.

Fifita is not a member of the Anoa'i family but has close connection with Dwayne Johnson, who considers him as an uncle.

== Legacy and reputation ==
Many former wrestling personalities have described Fifita as the toughest or greatest legitimate fighter in wrestling, including Stone Cold Steve Austin, Road Warrior Animal, The Undertaker, Perry Saturn, Barbarian and Warlord, Hulk Hogan, Rocky Johnson, The Rock, Arn Anderson, Goldberg, Big Van Vader, Fit Finlay, Mean Gene Okerlund, Ric Flair, Stu Hart, Rikishi, Frenchy Martin, Jim Cornette, Bob Holly, Dave Penzer, Gino Brito, J. J. Dillon, Sonny Onoo, and Hillbilly Jim.

On 3 March 1989, Haku got into an altercation with some men at a Baltimore Airport bar who called wrestling "fake", and during the fight, Haku bit off the nose of one of the men. Haku stated, "Yeah. It was in Baltimore Airport...me and Siva Afi went over and there were lots of babyfaces there at the bar. So we went and sat in the other corner away from them. When they were ready to close, we had a few drinks, and on our way out there were five guys just sitting there. Of course, the same thing came out. The 'fake' stuff. 'Hey, are you guys with those guys – wrestlers? The fake wrestlers on TV?' You know. I said, 'Yeah. I'll show you.' And I reached over without thinking – there are four other guys there (laughs) – grabbed his face, and bit his nose off. Then the fight started. Me and Siva kind of cleaned house there and left. I'll never forget it."

In a shoot interview Bobby Heenan talked extensively about Meng and referred to him as the toughest man he has ever met. The most extreme story he shared was in regard to a bar fight in which he claimed Meng with a guy and "took his two fingers on his right hand, his index finger and trigger finger, and he reached into the guy's mouth and he broke off the guy's bottom teeth." Heenan said that if he had not been there and seen it himself, he would not believe it. Heenan was also close friends with Andre the Giant and claimed that the only two men in the world that Andre feared were Meng and Harley Race. Heenan also praised Haku as a good-hearted family man.

Kevin Sullivan told a story to WWE Classics about the time when he and Haku went to a tavern to grab a few beers before heading to their hotel. According to Sullivan, it was obvious that he and Meng were not locals, so when they walked into the bar, a guy playing pool insulted Meng. "The next thing I know is that Meng goozles the guy like Mr. Spock," Sullivan said. "It was fast and furious. He then grabbed another guy who tried to get involved and knocked him unconscious." After that, things got even crazier. "Meng bit through the guy's shirt like a wolf, bit a chunk out of the guy's back, then spit it on the floor," he said. "I said, 'It's time to go.'" Sullivan said that as they drove from the bar he saw police cars pulling into the parking lot, but authorities did not pursue them and no charges were ever filed.

Wrestler Shane Douglas said in a shoot interview that one would be better off fighting the US Army than fighting Haku. He spoke about an incident when he witnessed several cops trying to hold Haku down and one of them struck Haku with a baton on his face while the others emptied their cans of mace on him but Haku did not visibly react.

== Championships and accomplishments ==
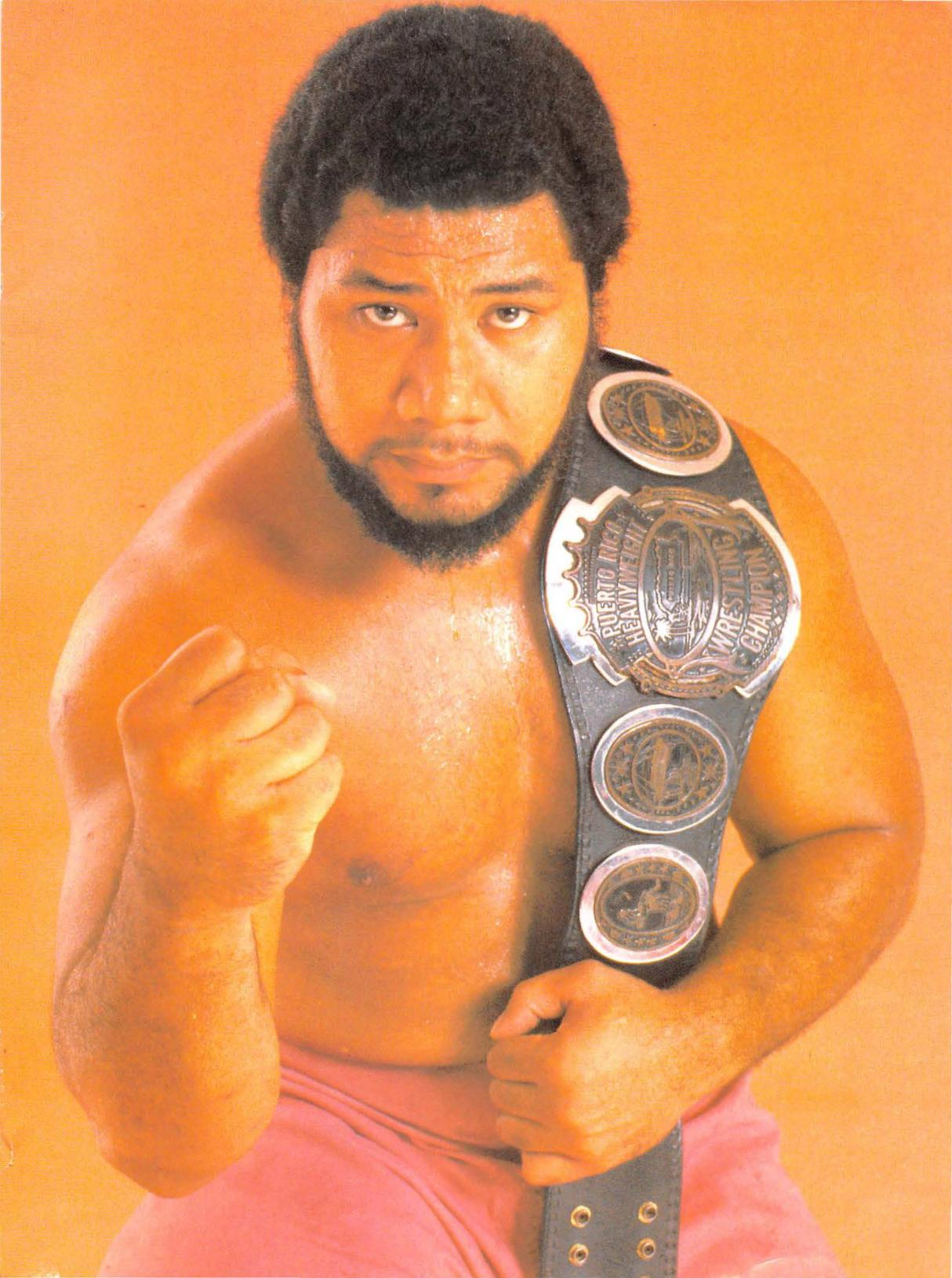
King Tonga as the WWC Puerto Rico Champion in 1983

- 50th State Big Time Wrestling
  - NWA Hawaii Heavyweight Championship (1 time)
- All Japan Pro Wrestling
  - 2 January Korakuen Hall Heavyweight Battle Royal (1981)
- Cauliflower Alley Club
  - Tag Team Award (2019) - with The Barbarian
- George Tragos/Lou Thesz Professional Wrestling Hall of Fame
  - Frank Gotch Award (2023)
- Impact Pro Wrestling
  - IPW New Zealand Tag Team Championship (1 time) – with Liger
- North Carolina Wrestling Association
  - NCWA Tag Team Championship (1 time) – with The Barbarian
- Lutte Internationale
  - Canadian International Heavyweight Championship (1 time)
  - Canadian International Tag Team Championship (1 time) – with Richard Charland
- NWA Mid-America
  - NWA World Six-Man Tag Team Championship (1 time) – with Ken Lucas and George Gulas
- Pro Wrestling Illustrated
  - Ranked No. 92 of the top 500 singles wrestlers in the PWI 500 in 1995
  - Ranked No. 330 of the top 500 singles wrestlers of the "PWI Years" in 2003
- SSW Entertainment
  - SSW Tag Team Championship (1 time) – with The Barbarian
- Super World of Sports
  - SWS Tag Team Championship (2 times) – with Yoshiaki Yatsu
- Tokyo Sports
  - Effort Award (1980)
- World Championship Wrestling
  - WCW Hardcore Championship (1 time)
- World League Wrestling
  - WLW Heavyweight Championship (3 times)
- World Wrestling Council
  - WWC North American Tag Team Championship (1 time) – with El Gran Apolo
  - WWC Puerto Rico Championship (2 times)
  - WWC World Tag Team Championship (1 time) – with Hercules Ayala
- World Wrestling Federation
  - WWF Tag Team Championship (1 time) – with André the Giant
  - Slammy Award (1 time)
    - Bobby "The Brain" Heenan Scholarship Award (1987) with André the Giant, Hercules, King Kong Bundy, Harley Race and Tama
- World Xtreme Wrestling
  - WXW Hardcore Championship (2 times)
- Wrestling Observer Newsletter
  - Worst Worked Match of the Year (1996) with Ric Flair, Arn Anderson, The Barbarian, Lex Luger, Kevin Sullivan, Z-Gangsta, and The Ultimate Solution vs. Hulk Hogan and Randy Savage in a Towers of Doom match at Uncensored

== Sumo career record ==
Fukunoshima Hiroshi
Year	January Hatsu basho, Tokyo	March Haru basho, Osaka	May Natsu basho, Tokyo	July Nagoya basho, Nagoya	September Aki basho, Tokyo	November Kyūshū basho, Fukuoka
1974	x	x	x	x	x	(Maezumō)
1975	West Jonokuchi #19; 5–2	West Jonidan #71; 5–2	East Jonidan #42; 6–1	East Sandanme #80; 4–3	East Sandanme #65; 3–4	West Sandanme #77; 7–0–D
1976	East Makushita #60; 3–4	East Sandanme #8; 3–4	West Sandanme #21; 5–2	West Makushita #56; 6–1	East Makushita #27; Retired; 1–2–4	x
Record given as wins–losses–absences Top division champion Top division runner-up Retired Non-participation Jūryō Lower divisions Sanshō key: F=Fighting spirit; O=Outstanding performance; T=Technique Also shown: ★=Kinboshi; P=Playoff(s); Divisions: Makuuchi — Jūryō — Makushita — Sandanme — Jonidan — Jonokuchi Makuuchi ranks: Yokozuna — Ōzeki — Sekiwake — Komusubi — Maegashira

== Media ==
- WCW/nWo Revenge (Video Game – 1998)
- WCW/nWo Thunder (Video Game – 1998)
- WWE Raw (Video Game – 2002)
- WWE 2K16 (Video Game – 2015)
- The Unbreakable Bunch (movie - 2025)
- WWE 2K25 (Video Game – 2025)
