= WAR (wrestling promotion) =

Japanese professional wrestling promotion

Wrestle Association R
- Acronym: WAR
- Founded: 1992
- Defunct: 2000 (reunion show in 2006)
- Style: Puroresu; Strong style
- Headquarters: Japan
- Founder: Genichiro Tenryu
- Owner: Genichiro Tenryu
- Formerly: Wrestling And Romance
- Predecessor: Super World of Sports
- Successor: Tenryu Project

Wrestle Association R (formerly known as Wrestle and Romance and abbreviated as WAR) was a Japanese professional wrestling promotion founded and run by Genichiro Tenryu as the successor to Super World of Sports, and which lasted from 1992 to 2000. The promotion initially established as Wrestle and Romance in 1992 and had very few regular contracted workers; instead most of the workers were either freelance or employed in other promotions. Because of this WAR ran many all-star cards. It had inter-promotional feuds against New Japan Pro-Wrestling, Frontier Martial-Arts Wrestling, the new Tokyo Pro Wrestling, and UWF International. WAR also continued, albeit in a loose fashion, SWS's old working agreement with the World Wrestling Federation, when they backed the WWF's first Japanese tour, in 1994.

On July 28, 1995, WAR was renamed "Wrestle Association R" at a show held in the Korakuen Hall. In 1998, WAR cancelled contracts to the roster and began running fewer and fewer events due to Tenryu's comeback in New Japan, and in July 2000, it promoted a farewell show that served as the prelude to Tenryu's return to All Japan Pro Wrestling (many wrestlers from WAR also joined AJPW to fill the void by those who joined Mitsuharu Misawa in forming Pro Wrestling Noah). The WAR name was kept for the use of a stable led by Tenryu during brief angles in All Japan and FMW in 2001.

On July 27, 2006, WAR staged a reunion show at Tokyo Korakuen Hall. The show was supported by various Japanese wrestling promotions including New Japan, All Japan Pro Wrestling and Dragon Gate. This was also the final card promoted under the WAR banner.

WAR was the first promotion to create a steady junior heavyweight tag team title long before New Japan Pro-Wrestling, WCW, and Pro Wrestling Noah hit upon the idea.

In 2010 the Tenryu Project was organised and is somewhat of a successor to WAR.

== Championships ==
=== J-1 Heavyweight Championship ===
J-1 Heavyweight Championship

Details
- Promotion: Japan Pro Wrestling Alliance
Statistics
- First champion: Rikidōzan
- Final champion: Genichiro Tenryu
- Longest reign: Rikidōzan

This title used the championship belt originally used in the 1950s by the old Japan Pro Wrestling Alliance for their JWA Japanese Heavyweight Championship, held throughout its existence by Rikidōzan.

Wrestler:	Times:	Date:	Location:	Notes:
Genichiro Tenryu	1	January 14, 1998	Tokyo, Japan	Defeated Nobutaka Araya in a tournament final to become the first champion.
Title abandoned		July 23, 2000		Title was abandoned when WAR closed and Tenryu joined All Japan Pro Wrestling (may have been abandoned earlier when Tenryu won IWGP Heavyweight Championship on December 10, 1999). The company held their official final event on July 27, 2006.

=== Other titles ===
- WAR International Junior Heavyweight Championship
- WAR International Junior Heavyweight Tag Team Championship
- WAR World Six-Man Tag Team Championship

== Alumni ==
These are not exhaustive lists. Guest Japanese wrestlers from other promotions, such as Nobuhiko Takada from UWF International and The Great Sasuke from Michinoku Pro Wrestling, are not listed.

Birth name:	Ring name(s):	Tenure:
Genichiro Shimada	Genichiro Tenryu	1992–2000; 2006
Masao Orihara	Masao Orihara	1992–1999; 2006
Susumu Hara	Ashura Hara	1992–1994
Takashi Ishikawa	Takashi Ishikawa	1992–1994; 1996–1997
Hiromichi Fuyuki	Hiromichi Fuyuki	1992–1996
Keiji Takayama	Gedo	1994–1996
Shoji Akiyoshi	Jado	1994–1996
Heigo Hamaguchi	Animal Hamaguchi	1994–1995
Yoshihiro Asai	Ultimo Dragon	1992–1997
Kōji Kitao	Kōji Kitao	1994–1998
Isao Takagi	Arashi	1995–1999
Tatsumi Kitahara	Koki Kitahara	1992–2000; 2006
Nobutaka Araya	Nobutaka Araya	1995–2000
Nobukazu Hirai	Nobukazu Hirai	1992–2000
Osamu Kawahara	Osamu Tachihikari	1994–2000
Tomohiro Ishii	Tomohiro Ishii	1996–2000; 2006
Masaaki Mochizuki	Masaaki Mochizuki	1994–2000; 2006
Koji Iibashi	Koji Ishinriki	1993–1994; 2006
Yuji Yasuraoka	Yuji Yasuraoka	1992–1999
Chris Irvine	Lionheart / Lion Do	1994–1996
Scott Bigelow	Crusher Bam Bam Bigelow	1994; 1996
Rick Bognar	Big Titan / Ti Do	1995–1996
Rick Wilson	Rio, Lord of the Jungle	1993–1994
Lance Evers	Lance Storm	1995–1998
Robert Backlund	Bob Backlund	1994–1995
James Bernardski	Scott Putski	1994
Terry Szopinski	The Warlord	1993–1994
Terry Gordy	Terry Gordy	1998
Oscar Gutierrez	Rey Misterio, Jr.	1995–1996
Lawrence Shreve	Abdullah the Butcher	1997–1998
John Tenta	John Tenta	1993–1996
Dionicio Torres	Psicosis	1995–1996
Tonga Fifita	King Haku	1992–1994

== Notable events ==
=== WAR/WWF ===
An inter-promotional show between WAR and the World Wrestling Federation was held on September 15, 1992, at the Yokohama Arena in Yokohama, Kanagawa, Japan.

No.	Results	Stipulations	Times
1	Yuji Yasuraoka defeated Koji Inomata	Singles match	8:48
2	Chavo Guerrero and Paul Diamond defeated Nobukazu Hirai and Yoshiro Ito	Tag team match	10:11
3	Masashi Aoyagi defeated Masao Orihara by count-out	Singles match	9:29
4	Ultimo Dragon defeated Negro Casas	Singles match	14:55
5	Heisei Ishingun (Kengo Kimura and Shiro Koshinaka) defeated Hiromichi Fuyuki and Tatsumi Kitahara	Tag team match	13:44
6	The Great Kabuki defeated Takashi Ishikawa	Singles match	9:36
7	Animal Warrior defeated The Beverly Brothers (Beau and Blake)	Handicap match	6:14
8	The Undertaker (with Paul Bearer) defeated King Haku	Singles match	5:22
9	Ric Flair (c) vs. Genichiro Tenryu ended in a draw	Two out of three falls match for the WWF Championship	37:50
(c) / – the champion(s) heading into the match

=== WAR Anniversary Show ===
WAR Anniversary Show was the flagship event of WAR which was used to celebrate the anniversary of the promotion. The event was held between 1993 and 2000, when the promotion was discontinued.

=== WAR/LLPW ===
An inter-promotional event featuring talent from WAR and Ladies Legend Pro-Wrestling was held on November 28, 1993, at the Sumo Hall in Tokyo, Japan.

No.	Results	Stipulations
1	Noriyo Tateno defeated Carol Midori	Singles match
2	Michiko Nagashima and Rumi Kazama defeated Shara and Utako Hozumi	Tag team match
3	Carol Midori won	Battle royal
4	Nobukazu Hirai defeated Yuji Yasuraoka	Singles match
5	Koki Kitahara defeated Shigekazu Tajiri	Singles match
6	Hiromichi Fuyuki vs. Super Strong Machine ended in a draw	Singles match
7	Genichiro Tenryu and Masao Orihara defeated Ashura Hara and Ultimo Dragon	Tag team match

=== Revolution ===
Revolution was a special event held on December 15, 1993, at the Sumo Hall in Tokyo, Japan.

No.	Results	Stipulations	Times
1	Nobukazu Hirai and Yuji Yasuraoka defeated Tatsuhito Takaiwa and Yuji Nagata	Tag team match	9:02
2	The Great Kabuki defeated Black Cat	Singles match	7:20
3	Ultimo Dragon (c) defeated Atlantis	Singles match for the UWA World Middleweight Championship	15:54
4	John Tenta defeated The Warlord	Singles match	9:19
5	Ashura Hara and Ishinriki defeated King Haku and Masao Orihara	Tag team natch	17:04
6	Hiroshi Hase defeated Koki Kitahara	Singles match	20:24
7	Mil Mascaras defeated Gran Markus Jr.	Singles match	8:08
8	Hiromichi Fuyuki and Super Strong Machine defeated Heisei Ishingun (Shiro Koshinaka and Tatsutoshi Goto	Tag team match	11:36
9	Genichiro Tenryu defeated Tatsumi Fujinami	Singles match	14:14
(c) / – the champion(s) heading into the match

=== Revolution Rumble '94 In Ryogoku Kokugikan ===
Revolution Rumble '94 In Ryogoku Kokugikan was a special event held on March 2, 1994, at the Ryōgoku Kokugikan in Tokyo, Japan. The event was notable for an inter-promotional tag team main event match in which Genichiro Tenryu and Ashura Hara represented WAR against Frontier Martial-Arts Wrestling's Atsushi Onita and Tarzan Goto. Onita pinned Tenryu and the match set up a major main event between Tenryu and Onita for FMW's 5th Anniversary Show at the Kawasaki Stadium on May 5, 1994.

No.	Results	Stipulations	Times
1	Jado and Gedo defeated Masanobu Kurisu and Nobukazu Hirai	Tag team match	11:02
2	Koki Kitahara defeated Kim Duk	Singles match	10:44
3	Arashi versus Hiromichi Fuyuki ended in a time limit draw in Round 5	Singles match	—
4	Hiromichi Fuyuki defeated Arashi	Singles match	1:27
5	Masao Orihara and Ultimo Dragon defeated Sato and The Great Sasuke	Tag team match	28:13
6	Super Strong Machine defeated Lionheart	Singles match	8:11
7	King Haku defeated Mr. Hughes	Singles match	10:36
8	Koji Kitao defeated Ishinriki by knockout	Singles match	4:05
9	Atsushi Onita and Tarzan Goto defeated Ashura Hara and Genichiro Tenryu	Tag team match	18:13

=== Super J-Cup ===
Super J-Cup is a professional wrestling tournament featuring junior heavyweight wrestlers from all over the world. The tournament was originally conceived by Japanese wrestler Jushin Thunder Liger as a showcase for junior heavyweights from promotions from Asia and North America on a national level. WAR hosted the second edition of the tournament on December 13, 1995, at the Sumo Hall in Tokyo, Japan.

No.	Results	Stipulations	Times
1	Gran Naniwa defeated Damián 666	1995 Super J-Cup tournament first round	6:36
2	Shinjiro Otani defeated Masaaki Mochizuki via submission	1995 Super J-Cup tournament first round	4:00
3	Último Dragón defeated Shoichi Funaki	1995 Super J-Cup tournament first round	6:52
4	Gedo defeated Masayoshi Motegi via submission	1995 Super J-Cup tournament first round	6:56
5	Dos Caras defeated El Samurai	1995 Super J-Cup tournament first round	7:00
6	Lionheart defeated Hanzo Nakajima	1995 Super J-Cup tournament first round	6:48
7	Jushin Liger defeated Gran Naniwa	1995 Super J-Cup tournament quarter-final	9:13
8	Último Dragón defeated Shinjiro Otani	1995 Super J-Cup tournament quarter-final	13:30
9	Gedo defeated Dos Caras	1995 Super J-Cup tournament quarter-final	8:54
10	Wild Pegasus defeated Lionheart	1995 Super J-Cup tournament quarter-final	13:43
11	Jushin Liger defeated Último Dragón	1995 Super J-Cup tournament semi-final	17:19
12	Gedo defeated Wild Pegasus	1995 Super J-Cup tournament semi-final	9:20
13	Rey Misterio, Jr. defeated Psicosis	Singles match	9:39
14	Jushin Liger defeated Gedo	1995 Super J-Cup tournament final	15:47

=== WAR vs. UWFI: Super Summer Wars ===
An inter-promotional event featuring wrestlers from WAR and UWFI, among other promotions as well. The event took place a day after the 4th Anniversary Show on July 21, 1996, at the Sumo Hall in Tokyo, Japan.

No.	Results	Stipulations	Times
1	Kazushi Sakuraba and Yuhi Sano defeated Nobukazu Hirai and Osamu Taitoko via submission	Tag team match	11:24
2	Masao Orihara defeated Nobutaka Araya	Singles match	11:24
3	Arashi defeated John Tenta	Singles match	7:09
4	Lance Storm, Rey Misterio, Jr., Ultimo Dragon and Yuji Yasuraoka defeated Gedo, Jushin Thunder Liger, Juventud Guerrera and Lion Do	Eight-man tag team match	17:35
5	Jado defeated Yoshihiro Takayama	Singles match	10:12
6	Riki Choshu and Satoshi Kojima defeated Fuyuki-Gun (Hiromichi Fuyuki and Ti Do)	Tag team match	8:34
7	Shiro Koshinaka and Tatsumi Fujinami defeated Hiromitsu Kanehara and Nobuhiko Takada	Tag team match	9:20
8	Koki Kitahara defeated Masahito Kakihara via submission	Singles match	8:25
9	Genichiro Tenryu defeated Yoji Anjo	Singles match	11:44

=== Final - Reborn to Future ===
Final - Reborn to Future was a reunion event of WAR after the promotion had closed down in 2000 and marked the final event ever in WAR history. The event took place on July 27, 2006, at the Korakuen Hall in Tokyo, Japan. The event aired via tape delay on Gaora TV on August 17. The event featured a title defense of the WAR International Junior Heavyweight Championship which had been in possession of Masaaki Mochizuki since WAR closed in 2000 and the main event was an eight-man tag team match, in which WAR wrestlers took on Heisei Ishingun.

No.	Results	Stipulations	Times
1	Tomohiro Ishii defeated Koji Ishinriki	Singles match	6:14
2	Eagle Sawai and Magnum Tokyo defeated Genichiro Tenryu and Rumi Kazama	Mixed tag team match	6:15
3	Dos Caras and Gran Naniwa defeated Damien and Super Battle Ranger	Tag team match	7:59
4	Dragon Kid, Genki Horiguchi and Ryo Saito defeated Kenichiro Arai, Susumu Yokosuka and Yasushi Kanda	Six-man tag team match	14:45
5	Jado and Gedo defeated Gentaro and Kintaro Kanemura	Tag team match	14:52
6	Pentagon Black defeated Masaaki Mochizuki (c)	Singles match for the WAR International Junior Heavyweight Championship	19:42
7	Don Fujii, Genichiro Tenryu, Koki Kitahara and Masao Orihara defeated Heisei Ishingun (Shiro Koshinaka, Akitoshi Saito, Masashi Aoyagi and Michiyoshi Ohara) (with Kuniaki Kobayashi)	Eight-man tag team match	15:23
(c) / – the champion(s) heading into the match

== See also ==
- WAR tournaments
- Professional wrestling in Japan
