= Super World of Sports =

Japanese professional wrestling promotion

- Logo of Super World of Sports
- Acronym: SWS
- Founded: April 1990
- Defunct: 1992
- Headquarters: Tokyo, Japan
- Split from: All Japan Pro Wrestling
- Successor: Wrestle Association R Social Pro Wrestling Federation; Network of Wrestling; Pro Wrestling Crusaders

Super World of Sports, also known as Super World Sports or simply SWS, was a Japanese professional wrestling promotion from 1990 to 1992. Its motto was "Straight and Strong".

== History ==
=== Formation ===
As one of the biggest eyeglass companies in Japan, Megane Super first got involved in professional wrestling as a sponsor. In 1989, after the success of a Newborn UWF show at the Tokyo Dome, Megane Super began working behind the scenes for various promotions. One of the first people they hired was wrestler/manager KY Wakamatsu. Wakamatsu was a central figure in helping Megane Super negotiate deals to acquire wrestlers for their new promotion. Megane Super would use their abundant financial resources from their main eyeglass company to fund this new venture.

=== Building the Roster ===
The very first wrestler Megane Super wanted to sign was Keiji Muto. At the time, Muto was in the middle of an overseas excursion, wrestling for World Championship Wrestling as The Great Muta. Muto, remaining loyal to New Japan Pro Wrestling, turned them down. Then they attempted to sign Tatsumi Fujinami, who was out with a back injury and a hernia at the time. Like Muto, Fujinami turned them down, remaining with NJPW. It wasn't until April 26, 1990, when Genichiro Tenryu announced that he was leaving All Japan Pro Wrestling and announced he was joining Megane Super's new promotion. On May 10, Megane Super did a press conference, announcing the launch of their new promotion: Super World Sports. Five days later on May 15, KY Wakamatsu signed on as a wrestler and dojo master. Three weeks later on June 5, George Takano signed on a similar deal to Wakamatsu. Tenryu, Takano and Wakamatsu would be the de facto team captains of their respective stables.

By the end of June 1990, SWS was beginning to build their roster really fast. On June 27, Kendo Nagasaki, Goro Tsurumi and Akira Takayama signed with the company. Five days later on July 2, Samson Fuyuki, Shunji Takano, Tatsumi Kitahara, Shinichi Nakano and Masao Orihara left AJPW and signed with the group. Nine days later on July 11, Takashi Ishikawa, who last wrestled for AJPW until his retirement in 1988, signed with SWS. The next day on July 12, they held a two-day newcomer audition and signed six wrestlers, including Kenichi Oya (who last wrestled for NJPW until briefly retiring in 1989), Tetsuya Yamanaka (a former AJPW dojo trainee) and Nobukazu Hirai. On August 7, Yoshiaki Yatsu and Isao Takagi quit AJPW to sign with SWS. Nine days later on August 16, The Great Kabuki, who had just won the World Tag Team Championship in AJPW days prior, quit to join SWS, vacating the AJPW World Tag Team Championship he held with Jumbo Tsuruta. A week later on August 23, Naoki Sano, who had quit NJPW and had just returned from an overseas excursion in North America, immediately signed with the promotion. Six days later on August 29, Ishinriki (who had just retired from sumo) signed with SWS and Fumihiro Niikura (who retired in 1986 after a heart attack) joined as a freelancer. A day later on August 30, SWS held a press conference, where they announced the roster was split into three stables: Revolution, led by Genichiro Tenryu; Dojo Geki, led by KY Wakamatsu; and Palaestra, led by George Takano. On September 16, Don Arakawa (a former NJPW star, who retired in 1989) signed with the group, solidifying the original roster.

=== Rise and Demise ===
==== 1990 ====
On September 29, 1990, SWS held its very first show at the Fukui City Gymnasium. Nineteen days later on October 18, they held their first televised event at Yokohama Arena, which ran two days (TV Tokyo would air footage of the shows three days later). On November 1, Koji Kitao signed with the promotion, just months after his much-publicized firing from NJPW. Nineteen days later on November 20, SWS announced they have a working relationship with the World Wrestling Federation.

==== 1991 ====
On February 14, 1991, Megane Super sent a notice to SWS wrestlers to deny interview requests to any reporters representing Weekly Pro Wrestling. Ten days later on February 24, SWS held a second newcomer audition, which saw the signings of Yuji Yasuraoka, Toshiyuki Nakahara and Hikaru Kawabata. Nearly three weeks later on March 13, SWS announced a business partnership with Pro Wrestling Fujiwara-Gumi. Eleven days later on March 24, Genichiro Tenryu and Koji Kitao represented SWS on the WWF's WrestleMania VII event in Los Angeles, defeating Demolition. Six days later on March 30, SWS and WWF held their first interpromotional show at the Tokyo Dome. Two days later on April 1, they held another interpromotional show at the World Memorial Hall in Kobe; during that show, two incidents took place. First was Apollo Sugawara abandoning the match against Minoru Suzuki. Later that night, the infamous shoot between Koji Kitao and Earthquake took place. Three days later, SWS held an emergency meeting, firing Kitao from the company, fired The Great Kabuki as booker (though he remained as a wrestler). On July 19, Megane Super executive Hachiro Tanaka stepped down as President, with Tenryu taking over. Four days later on July 23, Ashura Hara, who last wrestled in AJPW until his firing in November 1988, signed with the company. On October 14, SWS announced a business partnership with Empresa Mexicana de Lucha Libre in Mexico. Ten days later on October 24, SWS announced the signing of Yoshihiro Asai, who would be also be EMLL's Far East representative. On December 12, SWS and WWF held their second Tokyo Dome show together. During the event, they unveiled its Junior Heavyweight Championship, with Naoki Sano defeating Rick Martel in a decision match to determine its first champion.

==== 1992 ====
On February 14, 1992, SWS unveiled its Tag Team Championship and a tournament was held to determine its first champions, with Yoshiaki Yatsu and King Haku defeating Genichiro Tenryu and Ashura Hara in the finals. Three months later on May 14, the Dojo Geki and Palaestra stable unite against Revolution. Eleven days later on May 25, Megane Super officially announced that SWS was folding after June. Nearly a month later on June 19, SWS held its final show at Nagasaki International Gymnasium. Eight days later on June 27, the wrestlers representing Dojo Geki and Palaestra announced they are launching a new promotion called Network of Wrestling (NOW). A day later on June 28, the wrestlers representing Revolution announced they were establishing a new promotion called Wrestle and Romance (WAR), ending SWS after nearly two years.

=== Split ===
SWS' talent split into the following federations: Yatsu's SPWF; Tenryu's new promotion, WAR, including Hara, Fuyuki, Kitahara; NOW, including Kendo Nagasaki, and PWC, including the Takano brothers and Takagi.

=== Impact ===
SWS's peak coincided with the general Japanese economic downturn of the early 1990s, though AJPW and NJPW continued to do good business during that period. Along with criticism of the wrestlers for selling out their original promotions, which was still fairly rare at that time, SWS was also hampered by the lack of Japanese vs Japanese rivalries, which had become a staple of NJPW and AJPW booking since the mid-1980s. Tenryu mainly battled foreigners such as Hogan and Flair, since none of the other Japanese wrestlers in SWS were positioned as being at or near his level. As Megane Super began withdrawing its support, the company began running fewer cards, until the promotion folded. Megane Super invested ¥9,900,000,000 ($62,746,562.83 USD) to run SWS.

=== Criticism ===
SWS was constantly criticized by the way Megane Super began throwing money offers around to build up their roster. Because of this, fans, wrestlers, and administrators of other Japanese promotions criticized SWS as being a "money puroresu" (Megane Super being the money mark) because of the way wrestlers flocked to it. The feeling was compounded when SWS signed a working relationship contract with Vince McMahon's WWF, for interpromotional purposes.

== Wrestlers ==
=== Main roster ===
Unlike many wrestling promotions, SWS had a wrestling roster that was divided into three stables, reminiscent of the sumo heya system. Revolution was mostly AJPW alumni, Palaestra was mostly NJPW alumni, and Geki Dojo were neutrals led by a heel manager, KY Wakamatsu. Yoshiaki Yatsu, who defected from AJPW three months after Tenryu, was added to Geki Dojo to give the group a senior level star.

==== Revolution ====
- Genichiro Tenryu, leader
- The Great Kabuki
- Kōji Kitao
- Ashura Hara
- Takashi Ishikawa
- Samson Fuyuki
- Tatsumi Kitahara
- Masao Orihara
- Nobukazu Hirai
- Toshiyuki Nakahara
- Yuji Yasuraoka

==== Geki Dojo ====
- KY Wakamatsu, leader
- Kendo Nagasaki
- Yoshiaki Yatsu
- Goro Tsurumi
- Shinichi Nakano
- Isao Takagi
- Ishinriki Kōji
- Hiroshi Hatanaka
- Hikaru Kawabata
- Tetsuya Yamanaka

==== Palaestra ====
- George Takano, leader
- Shunji Takano
- Naoki Sano
- Kenichi Oya
- Apollo Sugawara
- Fumihiro Niikura
- Akira Katayama
- Don Arakawa

=== Visiting wrestlers ===
==== World Wrestling Federation ====
- Randy Savage
- The Brooklyn Brawler
- The Bushwhackers (Luke and Butch)
- The Fabulous Rougeau Brothers (Jacques and Raymond)
- Greg Valentine
- Ted DiBiase
- The Rockers (Shawn Michaels and Marty Jannetty)
- Boris Zhukov
- Koko B. Ware
- King Haku
- Tito Santana
- Jimmy Snuka
- The Warlord
- The Barbarian
- The Hart Foundation (Bret Hart and Jim Neidhart)
- Earthquake
- Demolition (Smash and Crush)
- Hacksaw Jim Duggan
- Ultimate Warrior
- Sgt. Slaughter
- The Texas Tornado
- Mr. Perfect
- The Road Warriors
- Hulk Hogan
- Tugboat / Typhoon
- Power and Glory (Paul Roma and Hercules)
- Paul Diamond
- Pat Tanaka
- Rick Martel
- The British Bulldog
- The Berzerker
- The Undertaker
- The Beverly Brothers (Beau and Blake)
- Ric Flair
- Jim Powers
- Giant Kimala

==== Foreign freelancers ====
===== United States =====
- Killer Tim Brooks
- Chavo Guerrero Sr.
- Jeff Jarrett
- Kenny The Striker
- Bob Orton Jr.
- Rochester Roadblock
- Chris Walker (wrestler)
- Jeff Wheeler
- Snake Williams

===== Canada =====
- Giant Goliath
- Dino Ventura

===== Mexico =====
- El Dandy
- Atlantis
- Bestia Salvaje
- Emilio Charles Jr.
- Jerry Estrada
- Comando Ruso
- Blue Panther
- El Satanico
- Guerrero El Futuro
- Arkangel de la Muerte

===== Other =====
- Kato Kung Lee (Panama)
- Chris Adams (England)
- Gerry Morrow (Martinique)
- The Samoan Swat Team (Samoan Savage and Fatu) (Samoa)

==== Guests from other Japanese promotions ====
===== Pro Wrestling Fujiwara Gumi =====
- Masakatsu Funaki
- Yoshiaki Fujiwara
- Minoru Suzuki
- Wellington Wilkins Jr.
- Jerry Flynn

===== Universal Lucha Libre/Federación Universal de Lucha Libre =====
- Gran Hamada
- Yoshihiro Asai/Ultimo Dragon
- Punish/Coolie S.Z.
- Crush/Bulldog K.T.

== SWS championships ==
SWS never had a Heavyweight Championship.

=== SWS Junior Heavyweight Championship ===
Key
No.	Overall reign number
Reign	Reign number for the specific champion
Days	Number of days held

No.	Champion	Championship change			Reign statistics		Notes	Ref.
No.	Champion	Date	Event	Location	Reign	Days	Notes	Ref.
1	Naoki Sano	December 12, 1991	SWS/WWF SuperWrestle	Tokyo, Japan	1	190	Won a tournament to become the SWS/Japanese representative and then defeated WWF representative Rick Martel to become the inaugural champion.	
—	Deactivated	June 19, 1992	—	—	—	—	Title retired when SWS closed.	

=== SWS Tag Team Championship ===
Key
No.	Overall reign number
Reign	Reign number for the specific team—reign numbers for the individuals are in parentheses, if different
Days	Number of days held

No.	Champion	Championship change			Reign statistics		Notes	Ref.
No.	Champion	Date	Event	Location	Reign	Days	Notes	Ref.
1	Yoshiaki Yatsu and King Haku	February 14, 1992	Live event	Kyoto, Japan	1	62	Defeated Genichiro Tenryu and Ashura Hara in a tournament final to become the first champions.	
2	George Takano and Shunji Takano	April 16, 1992	Live event	Minamiashigara, Japan	1	1		
3	The Natural Disasters (Earthquake John Tenta and Typhoon)	April 17, 1992	Live event	Yokohama, Japan	1	1		
4	Yoshiaki Yatsu and King Haku	April 18, 1992	Live event	Tokyo, Japan	2	62		
—	Deactivated	June 19, 1992	—	—	—	—	Title retired when SWS closed.	

== See also ==
- Professional wrestling in Japan
- List of professional wrestling promotions in Japan
