= Isao Takagi =

Japanese professional wrestler

Personal information
- Born: November 8, 1961 (age 64) Moriguchi, Osaka, Japan

Professional wrestling career
- Ring name(s): Isao Takagi; Arashi (II); Love Machine Storm
- Billed height: 1.90 m (6 ft 3 in)
- Billed weight: 146 kg (322 lb)
- Debut: March 31, 1987

Takuetsuyama Gorō
Personal information
- Native name: 卓越山 吾郎
- Born: Isao Takagi; November 8, 1961 (age 64) Moriguchi, Osaka, Japan
- Height: 1.87 m (6 ft 2 in)
- Weight: 148 kg (326 lb)

Sport
- Sport: Sumo
- Retired: July, 1986
- Heya: Takadagawa
- Record: 222-185-17
- Debut: March, 1977
- Highest rank: Jūryō 5 (November, 1985)
- Updated on Feb. 2022

Isao Takagi (高木 功, Takagi Isao; born November 8, 1961) who goes by the ring name Arashi (嵐), is a Japanese professional wrestler from Moriguchi, Osaka Prefecture, who works for Dradition. He has previously worked for All Japan Pro Wrestling.

== Career ==
Takagi was initially a sumo wrestler under the name of Takuetsuyama (previously Maenohikari). He joined Takadagawa stable, run by former ozeki Maenoyama, in 1977. He reached elite sekitori status upon promotion to the second highest jūryō division in July 1985, but was demoted back to the unsalaried makushita division after only four tournaments. In 1986, at the age of 24, he decided to quit sumo and joined All Japan Pro Wrestling (AJPW) upon an offer from owner Giant Baba. He made his debut in 1987. The same year he accompanied Baba to an excursion into Jim Crockett Promotions, where they competed in the Jim Crockett Sr. Memorial Cup Tag Team Tournament. They made it into the semifinals before being defeated by eventual runners-up Lex Luger and Tully Blanchard.

Takagi remained a strong member of the undercard, feuding with dojo classmates Akira Taue, Kenta Kobashi, Tsuyoshi Kikuchi and Tatsumi Kitahara. In 1990, however, he decided to follow former sumo wrestler Genichiro Tenryu out of AJPW and into a new promotion, Super World of Sports (SWS). Takagi was fired from SWS in early 1991, with the company claiming he missed too many training sessions due to claimed injuries and he spent too much time gambling. Afterwards, Takagi wandered in the independents until settling down in the successor promotion, WAR.

In WAR he adopted the name Arashi (storm), originally a masked gimmick used by also former rikishi Daikokubō Benkei. His first success came teaming with Koki Kitahara (formerly known as Tatsumi), and with Nobutaka Araya, formerly of International Wrestling Association of Japan, to win the WAR 6-Man Tag Team Championship.

In 1998, as WAR went into decline due to Tenryu making a comeback in New Japan Pro-Wrestling, Arashi went to Yoshiaki Yatsu's SPWF promotion. He stayed there until Tenryu called him back to AJPW in 2001. Initially he supported Tenryu's WAR faction, but after Tenryu left yet again, aligned himself with Keiji Mutoh, and won the World Tag Team Championship with him in 2003. On December 27, he and Muto (under his Great Muta persona) defeated Christopher Daniels and Dan Maff to retain the title at an ROH vs. All Japan card.

Arashi made the finals of the Champion Carnival the same year, where he fell to Satoshi Kojima. He received a shot at Triple Crown Heavyweight Champion Shinya Hashimoto, but was defeated.

After he and Mutoh lost the World Tag Team Championship to Kojima and Kaz Hayashi, Arashi was relegated back to the mid-card.

In September 2006, after a trial on drug charges, Takagi was sentenced to three years in prison. Freed after serving a portion of his sentence, Takagi returned to professional wrestling, working in Tatsumi Fujinami's Muga World (now Dradition) promotion. In 2007, Takagi appeared during a match under his real name for the first time since 1993, but reverted to the Arashi name in early 2008.

After Tenryu Project had its final card where Tenryu retired in November 2015, Arashi also went into inactivity, only coming back for a charity card on February 4, 2021 when where he teamed with Takao Omori, Tsuyoshi Kikuchi and Tiger Mask II (Kotaro Suzuki substituting for the late Mitsuharu Misawa) and lost to Masanobu Fuchi, Atsushi Onita, Shiro Koshinaka and Great Kojika in a "Giant Baba Anniversary Memorial" card promoted by referee Kyohei Wada and announcer Fumihito Kihara.

== Championships and accomplishments ==
- All Japan Pro Wrestling

- All Asia Tag Team Championship (2 times) – with Koki Kitahara (1) and Nobutaka Araya (1)
- World Tag Team Championship (1 time) – with Keiji Mutoh
- January 2 Korakuen Hall Heavyweight Battle Royal (2006)

- Apache Army

- WEW Heavyweight Championship (1 time)

- Tenryu Project

- Tenryu Project 6-Man Tag Team Championship (2 times) – with Suwama and Tomohiro Ishii (1) and Genichiro Tenryu and Tomohiro Ishii (1)

- Wrestle Association "R"

- WAR World Six-Man Tag Team Championship (1 time) – with Koki Kitahara and Nobutaka Araya

== Sumo career record ==
Takuetsuyama Gorō
Year	January Hatsu basho, Tokyo	March Haru basho, Osaka	May Natsu basho, Tokyo	July Nagoya basho, Nagoya	September Aki basho, Tokyo	November Kyūshū basho, Fukuoka
1977	x	(Maezumo)	West Jonokuchi #11; 6–1	East Jonidan #53; 5–2	East Jonidan #19; 3–4	West Jonidan #28; Sat out due to injury 0–0–7
1978	West Jonidan #73; 6–1	West Jonidan #13; 5–2	West Sandanme #64; 4–3	East Sandanme #46; 3–4	West Sandanme #58; 2–5	West Sandanme #88; 6–1
1979	East Sandanme #38; 5–2	West Sandanme #11; 3–4	East Sandanme #26; 3–4	West Sandanme #38; 5–2	West Sandanme #11; 5–2	West Makushita #44; 2–5
1980	West Sandanme #7; 5–2	West Makushita #45; 5–2	West Makushita #27; 3–4	East Makushita #36; 3–4	West Makushita #44; 3–4	East Makushita #59; 5–2
1981	West Makushita #35; 4–3	West Makushita #28; 5–2	East Makushita #15; 4–3	West Makushita #8; 1–6	West Makushita #31; 4–3	West Makushita #22; 3–4
1982	West Makushita #31; 4–3	West Makushita #25; 3–4	West Makushita #37; 5–2	West Makushita #20; 3–4	West Makushita #29; 5–2	East Makushita #16; 3–4
1983	West Makushita #23; 3–4	East Makushita #33; 4–3	West Makushita #23; 4–3	West Makushita #16; 5–2	West Makushita #8; 2–5	East Makushita #21; 4–3
1984	West Makushita #12; 5–2	West Makushita #5; 3–4	East Makushita #10; 4–3	East Makushita #6; 5–2	East Makushita #3; 2–5	East Makushita #17; 5–2
1985	East Makushita #9; 4–3	West Makushita #4; 4–3	West Makushita #2; 4–3	West Jūryō #11; 9–6	East Jūryō #8; 8–7	West Jūryō #5; 6–6–3
1986	East Jūryō #9; 3–12	West Makushita #4; 4–3	West Makushita #1; 3–4	East Makushita #5; Retired; 0–0–7	x	x
Record given as wins–losses–absences Top division champion Top division runner-up Retired Lower divisions Non-participation Sanshō key: F=Fighting spirit; O=Outstanding performance; T=Technique Also shown: ★=Kinboshi; P=Playoff(s); Divisions: Makuuchi — Jūryō — Makushita — Sandanme — Jonidan — Jonokuchi Makuuchi ranks: Yokozuna — Ōzeki — Sekiwake — Komusubi — Maegashira
