= Ishinriki Kōji =

Japanesr sumo wrestler (born 1961)

Personal information
- Native name: 維新力浩司
- Born: Kōji Iibashi; 24 January 1961 (age 65) Suginami, Tokyo
- Height: 175 cm (5 ft 9 in)
- Weight: 85 kg (187 lb)

Sport
- Sport: Sumo
- Retired: July 1990
- Heya: Onaruto
- Record: 390–372
- Debut: March 1976
- Highest rank: Jūryō 1 (November 1989)

Ishinriki Kōji (born 24 January 1961 as Kōji Iibashi) is a former sumo wrestler from Suginami, Tokyo, Japan. His highest rank was jūryō 1. He was one of the smallest sekitori ever at 175 cm (5 ft 9 in) and 85 kg (187 lb). After his retirement in 1990 he became a professional wrestler for a number of organizations including Super World of Sports, WAR, Pro Wrestling Crusaders and IWA Japan.

== Sumo career ==
Despite his family having a background in professional wrestling, he took part in many regional sumo competitions in elementary and junior high school. He entered professional sumo in March 1976, joining Onaruto stable. He was recruited by the former sekiwake Kōtetsuyama. He initially fought under the shikona of Wakakotetsu, based on his stablemaster's, but in 1984 he became Ishinriki ("renewal power"), the name which he was also to use in pro-wrestling. He had a muscular build quite unlike other sumo wrestlers, but despite his weight disadvantage he managed to reach the jūryō division in May 1987 and was ranked there for 20 consecutive tournaments, with a 141–159 win/loss record. In March 1990 he defeated two future yokozuna, Akebono and Wakahanada, and he also looked to have defeated a third, Takahanada, but he was disqualified for a foul. He twice took part in playoffs for the jūryō championship in May and September 1989, but lost both times. He is the only wrestler to twice have the best record in jūryō but never earn promotion to the top makuuchi division. His highest rank of jūryō 1 west was achieved in November 1989. He retired in July 1990 after a 2–13 record left him facing certain demotion to the unsalaried makushita division. His overall record was 390 wins against 372 losses over 87 tournaments, with no matches missed.

== Wrestling career ==
With 20 consecutive tournaments as a sekitori Ishinriki met the minimum requirement of inheriting an elder name in the Japan Sumo Association, and his stablemaster was prepared to let him inherit Onaruto stable, but Ishiniriki decided against it, believing he could make more money in professional wrestling. Although his elder brother was active in All Japan Pro Wrestling, Ishinriki instead joined SWS, making his debut in January 1991 in a match against Jeff Jarrett in Dallas, Texas. After SWS folded he was a member of its successors NOW and WAR, but then retired due to kidney problems. He married a fellow professional wrestler from WAR, Hozumi Shige and opened a chankonabe and karaoke restaurant in Kichijōji in 1994. While still running the restaurant he returned to wrestling in 2006, participating in IWA Japan and freelance promotions. He frequently appears as a guest on talk shows to discuss sumo. He appeared on the TV Asahi program "Live TV until the morning" (朝まで生テレビ!) to discuss the Tokitsukaze stable hazing scandal in 2007, and in 2011 when many top wrestlers were dismissed in a match-fixing scandal he denied that sumo had a problem with gambling and yazuka ties, despite his stablemaster Onaruto making similar claims in a book published shortly after his death in 1996.

In August 2015 he said he would likely retire from wrestling the following year, which would mark the 40th anniversary of his sumo career. However, in August 2016 he was promoting a mixed tag team match also involving Funaki to be held on 6 November at the Shinjuku Face.

In 2022, he joined his son in Dragon Gate for multiple matches. He teamed with his son Ishin to face Masaaki Mochizuki and his son, Mochizuki Jr., on September 9. He unsuccessfully challenged for the Open the Triangle Gate Championship with Ishin and Don Fujii on September 19.

== Fighting style ==
In sumo Ishinriki specialized in throwing techniques, with his three most common winning kimarite being shitatenage (underarm throw), uwatenage (overarm throw) and uwatedashinage (pulling overarm throw).

== Personal life ==
He is married to former Japan Women's Pro-Wrestling and LLPW wrestler Utako Hozumi, whom he met during his WAR days.

Their sons, Riki and Ishin, are also professional wrestlers who made their debuts at a Dragon Gate tournament in Ōta, Tokyo on September 20, 2021. Riki, however, retired on June 6, 2022.

== Career record ==
Ishinriki Kōji
Year	January Hatsu basho, Tokyo	March Haru basho, Osaka	May Natsu basho, Tokyo	July Nagoya basho, Nagoya	September Aki basho, Tokyo	November Kyūshū basho, Fukuoka
1976	x	(Maezumo)	East Jonokuchi #18; 4–3	East Jonidan #94; 5–2	East Jonidan #54; 2–5	East Jonidan #79; 4–3
1977	East Jonidan #51; 2–5	West Jonidan #78; 5–2	West Jonidan #24; 3–4	East Jonidan #36; 3–4	East Jonidan #53; 4–3	East Jonidan #31; 4–3
1978	East Jonidan #16; 5–2	West Sandanme #66; 2–5	East Jonidan #2; 5–2	East Sandanme #61; 3–4	East Sandanme #77; 4–3	West Sandanme #59; 3–4
1979	East Sandanme #70; 5–2	East Sandanme #43; 4–3	West Sandanme #29; 4–3	West Sandanme #17; 2–5	East Sandanme #41; 4–3	West Sandanme #24; 3–4
1980	West Sandanme #36; 5–2	West Sandanme #8; 4–3	West Makushita #57; 4–3	West Makushita #49; 2–5	West Sandanme #15; 4–3	East Sandanme #1; 4–3
1981	East Makushita #46; 5–2	West Makushita #29; 2–5	West Makushita #45; 5–2	West Makushita #24; 2–5	East Makushita #44; 5–2	East Makushita #28; 4–3
1982	East Makushita #17; 3–4	West Makushita #22; 3–4	East Makushita #34; 3–4	East Makushita #50; 3–4	East Sandanme #7; 6–1	West Makushita #33; 4–3
1983	West Makushita #27; 3–4	East Makushita #40; 6–1	East Makushita #15; 3–4	East Makushita #22; 2–5	East Makushita #40; 5–2	East Makushita #24; 3–4
1984	East Makushita #33; 4–3	East Makushita #25; 2–5	West Makushita #45; 3–4	West Makushita #56; 5–2	East Makushita #32; 4–3	East Makushita #24; 5–2
1985	West Makushita #12; 4–3	West Makushita #6; 4–3	West Makushita #4; 2–5	West Makushita #17; 4–3	East Makushita #13; 5–2	East Makushita #8; 4–3
1986	West Makushita #3; 1–6	West Makushita #29; 5–2	East Makushita #18; 3–4	East Makushita #27; 3–4	West Makushita #37; 6–1	East Makushita #17; 5–2
1987	West Makushita #7; 4–3	West Makushita #4; 6–1	East Jūryō #10; 9–6	East Jūryō #7; 7–8	East Jūryō #10; 7–8	West Jūryō #11; 8–7
1988	East Jūryō #9; 9–6	West Jūryō #5; 6–9	East Jūryō #10; 8–7	East Jūryō #7; 8–7	East Jūryō #6; 8–7	West Jūryō #2; 5–10
1989	East Jūryō #8; 8–7	East Jūryō #5; 5–10	East Jūryō #12; 10–5–P	West Jūryō #5; 6–9	West Jūryō #8; 10–5–P	West Jūryō #1; 5–10
1990	East Jūryō #6; 6–9	East Jūryō #10; 8–7	West Jūryō #7; 6–9	East Jūryō #11; Retired; 2–13	x	x
Record given as wins–losses–absences Top division champion Top division runner-up Retired Lower divisions Non-participation Sanshō key: F=Fighting spirit; O=Outstanding performance; T=Technique Also shown: ★=Kinboshi; P=Playoff(s); Divisions: Makuuchi — Jūryō — Makushita — Sandanme — Jonidan — Jonokuchi Makuuchi ranks: Yokozuna — Ōzeki — Sekiwake — Komusubi — Maegashira

== Championships and accomplishments ==
- Universal Wrestling Association
  - UWA World Middleweight Championship (1 time)

== See also ==
- Glossary of sumo terms
- List of past sumo wrestlers
