= Koki Kitahara =

Japanese retired professional wrestler (born 1964)

Personal information
- Born: March 9, 1964 (age 62) Fukuoka, Fukuoka, Japan

Professional wrestling career
- Ring name(s): Koki Kitahara; Tatsumi Kitahara; Sumo Hara
- Billed height: 1.82 m (6 ft 0 in)
- Billed weight: 110 kg (240 lb)
- Trained by: Genichiro Tenryu; Satoru Sayama
- Debut: April 8, 1988
- Retired: June 11, 2018

Tatsumi Kitahara (北原辰巳, Kitahara Tatsumi) (born March 9, 1964) is a Japanese retired professional wrestler better known by his ring name Koki Kitahara (北原光騎, Kitahara Kōki).

== Career ==
Kitahara trained in soccer and karate during high school, particularly the latter due to his penchant for street fighting. After graduating and moving to Tokyo, he started training mixed martial arts at Satoru Sayama's Super Tiger Gym and eventually became an instructor. Three years later, he developed an interest in professional wrestling and decided to become a wrestler.

=== All Japan Pro Wrestling (1988–1990) ===
Kitahara began as a trainee for Japan Pro-Wrestling in 1987. After the promotion dissolved, he transferred to All Japan Pro Wrestling and trained under Genichiro Tenryu. He made his debut on April 8, 1988, against Mitsuo Momota. He was part of Tenryu's Revolution stable. After spending nearly a year floundering in the opening and mid-card matches, Kitahara left for Canada in March 1989.

When he arrived in Canada, he joined Stu Hart's Stampede Wrestling in Calgary, where he used the ring name Sumo Hara. On July 4, Kitahara was involved in a car accident near Jasper, Alberta, while riding in a car with Ross Hart, Davey Boy Smith, Jason the Terrible and Chris Benoit, which he escaped with a minor shoulder injury. In August 1989, Kitahara won his first championship, the Stampede International Tag Team Championship with fellow Japanese wrestler Kensuke Sasaki. The two held the championship for more than a month before losing them to The Blackhearts. After Stampede shut down in December 1989, he returned to Japan in February 1990.

Upon returning to AJPW, Kitahara was finally finding his niche, but was cut short the summer of 1990, when Kitahara joined his mentor Tenryu and Megane Super. After leaving AJPW, Kitahara would make a brief return to Canada to wrestle for the Canadian National Wrestling Alliance as Sumo Hara, before returning to Japan for the new promotion.

=== Super World Sports (1990–1992) ===
Kitahara wrestled for Super World of Sports in 1990. As expected, he was part of Tenryu's group, Revolution. In December 1990, Kitahara took part in the original four-man tournament for the SWS Light Heavyweight Championship, but lost to Naoki Sano in the semi-finals when a doctor called a stop to the match. After a year in mid-card tag team matches, Kitahara teamed with Shinichi Nakano for a tournament to determine the SWS Tag Team Champions, but lost to his Revolution stablemates, Tenryu and Ashura Hara. In June 1992, SWS folded.

=== WAR (1992–2000) ===
Upon SWS's folding, Kitahara joined Tenryu in forming WAR. Now known as Koki Kitahara, in the early years of WAR, Kitahara would be Tenryu's main tag team partner in battles against New Japan Pro-Wrestling, but in later years, he teamed with Koji Kitao. In September 1994, Kitahara toured Mexico for Consejo Mundial de Lucha Libre. In April 1995, Kitahara won his first championship in Japan, the WAR World Six-Man Tag Team Championship, with Tenryu and Animal Hamaguchi. He won two more, with Arashi, Nobutaka Araya, and Lance Storm as his partners. In 1999, WAR folded.

=== Freelance (1999–2018) ===
In 1997, still as a WAR member, Kitahara formed his own mixed martial arts dojo, Capture International. It initially developed into a shoot-style professional wrestling promotion, which held its first card in 1998. He later expanded it into a non-profit private security company named Japan Blue Blazer.

After WAR folded, Kitahara focused primarily on Capture International, while taking select shows and tours of various promotions, including a brief return to AJPW in 2001, where he won the All Asia Tag Team Championship with Arashi, and also with Tenryu Project.

On April 2, 2018, Kitahara announced his retirement to take place at a June 11 card promoted by AJPW dojo classmate Kenta Kobashi, which will also be his 30th anniversary. In a tag team match, Kitahara and Mitsuya Nagai lost to Naomichi Marufuji and Super Tiger II.

== Championships and accomplishments ==
- All Japan Pro Wrestling
  - All Asia Tag Team Championship (1 time) - with Arashi
- Stampede Wrestling
  - Stampede International Tag Team Championship (1 time) - with Benkei Sasaki
- Wrestle And Romance / Wrestle Association "R"
  - WAR World Six-Man Tag Team Championship (3 times) - with Animal Hamaguchi and Genichiro Tenryu (1), Nobutaka Araya and Arashi (1) and Nobutaka Araya and Lance Storm (1)
