= Nobukazu Hirai =

Japanese professional wrestler (born 1969)

Personal information
- Born: December 30, 1969 (age 56) Meguro, Tokyo, Japan

Professional wrestling career
- Ring name(s): Nobukazu Hirai; Mitsu Hirai Jr. Hate; Super Hate
- Billed height: 1.85 m (6 ft 1 in)
- Billed weight: 85 kg (187 lb)
- Trained by: Genichiro Tenryu; SWS Dojo
- Debut: April 25, 1991

Nobukazu Hirai (born December 30, 1969) is a Japanese professional wrestler best known for competing in All Japan Pro Wrestling. He is the son of former Japan Pro Wrestling Alliance wrestler Mitsu Hirai.

== Professional wrestling career ==
=== Super World Sports (1991–1992) ===
Hirai originally trained in the SWS dojo under wrestling legend: Genichiro Tenryu and debuted for Super World Sports on April 25, 1991. During his time in SWS, Hirai was never pushed as he spent the time paying his dues and gaining experience. Hirai would remain with SWS until it folded in June 1992.

=== WAR (1992–2000) ===
After SWS folded, Hirai joined Tenryu's new promotion: WAR. In WAR, Hirai continued to remain in the midcard for most of the early-to mid 1990s. While working in WAR, Hirai also made appearances in New Japan Pro-Wrestling. In March 1994, Hirai took part in New Japan's Young Lion Cup defeating Tatsuhito Takaiwa in the first round but would unable to win the tournament with Satoshi Kojima eventually emerging as the winner. In May 1994, Hirai participated in a few live events for the WWF during their Japanese tour as he took on wrestlers such as Doink the Clown, Headshrinker Samu, and The Smoking Gunns. He also took part in a Royal Rumble.

By 1997, Hirai began to move up the card. On July 25, 1997, Hirai teamed with Mitsuharu Kitao and Tommy Dreamer in a match for the vacated WAR World Six-Man Tag Team Championship but lost to Koki Kitahara, Nobutaka Araya, and Lance Storm. On October 27, Hirai would finally win his first title when he teamed with Kitao and Masaaki Mochizuki to defeat Kitahara, Araya, and Storm to win the WAR Six-Man Tag Team Titles. In November 1997, Hirai took part in a tournament to crown the first J-1 World Heavyweight Champion but lost in the first round to Nobutaka Araya. On July 1, 1998, Kitao would retire from wrestling and the WAR Six Man Tag Titles were vacated. Hirai would continue to wrestle in WAR until it closed in 2000 after Tenryu returned to All Japan Pro Wrestling.

=== All Japan Pro Wrestling (2001–2011) ===
In 2001, Hirai joined All Japan where he continued to remain in the midcard despite the NOAH exodus. In January 2002, Hirai took part in the Giant Baba Cup where he finished in 3rd place in his block with 11 points. In 2003, Hirai formed a tag team with Shigeo Okumura. In July 2003, the team took part in the All-Asian Tag League tournament for the vacated All Asia Tag Team Championship but they finished in last place with 3 Points. On September 6, Hirai and Okumura challenged Kohei Sato and Hirotaka Yokoi for the All-Asia Tag Team Titles but they came up short. In early 2004, Hirai would briefly change his name to Mitsu Hirai Jr. but the name change did little for his career. On January 8, 2004, Hirai and Okumura received another shot at the All-Asia Tag Titles against Great Kosuke and Shiryu but lost. In late 2004, Hirai would form a new team with Nobutaka Araya and the two entered the 2004 World's Strongest Tag Determination League but they finished in last place of their block with 0 points. From 2005 to 2008, Hirai would spend his time in the low midcard and as a jobber as he wouldn't compete for titles and was left off tournaments.

In late 2008, Hirai turned heel and join the Voodoo Murders. On November 3, at Pro Wrestling Love in Ryogoku Vol. 6, Hirai teamed with TARU and brother YASSHI to defeat Suwama, Kaz Hayashi, and Ryuji Hijikata with Hirai pinning Hayashi. Afterward, Hirai changed his name to Hate and proceeded to change his look by wearing facepaint and used a fire extinguisher as a weapon. Hate teamed with TARU in the 2008 World's Strongest Tag Determination League where they finished in 7th place with 4 points. In 2009, Hate would lose weight and drop to the junior heavyweight division. On October 25, Hate would challenge Kaz Hayashi for the World Junior Heavyweight Championship but lost. In April 2010, Hate teamed with Minoru in the 2010 Junior Tag League, where they finished in 4th place with 2 points. In early 2011, Hate became Super Hate and entered the 2011 Junior Tag League teaming with MAZADA but the two finished in last place with 2 points.

On May 29, 2011, Hirai was involved in a backstage fight with TARU, which led to Hirai suffering a stroke after competing in a match. He eventually underwent successful surgery. Following the incident, all Japanese members of the Voodoo Murders (TARU, Minoru, KONO, and MAZADA) were suspended indefinitely from All Japan, the Voodoo Murders stable was disbanded and Keiji Mutoh resigned as the president of the promotion. As of February 2013, Hirai was still recovering from the incident, but was looking to eventually return to professional wrestling.

=== Total Nonstop Action Wrestling (2004) ===
Hirai competed in Total Nonstop Action Wrestling's 2004 World X-Cup Tournament as a member of Team Japan where they finished the tournament in last place with 2 points.

== Championships and accomplishments ==
- Wrestle Association "R"
  - WAR World Six-Man Tag Team Championship (1 time) - with Koji Kitao and Masaaki Mochizuki
