= John Tenta =

Canadian professional wrestler and sumo wrestler (1963–2006)

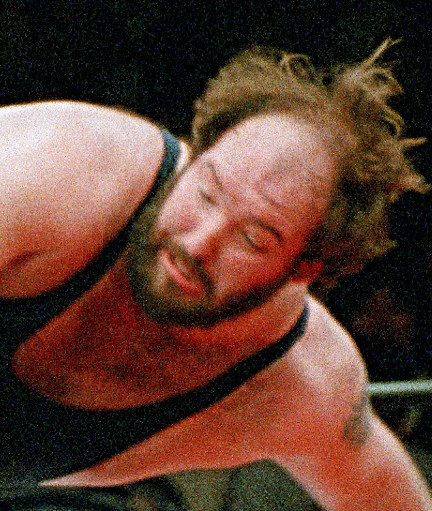
- Tenta in 1988

Personal information
- Born: John Anthony Tenta Jr. June 22, 1963 Surrey, British Columbia, Canada
- Died: June 7, 2006 (aged 42) Sanford, Florida, US
- Cause of death: Bladder cancer

Professional wrestling career
- Ring name(s): Avalanche; The Canadian Earthquake; Earthquake; Earthquake Evans; The Gargoyle; Golga; John Tenta; Kototenta (sumo); Kototenzan (sumo); The Shark
- Billed height: 6 ft 7 in (201 cm)
- Billed weight: 468 lb (212 kg)
- Billed from: Vancouver, British Columbia (as Earthquake); Mount Everett, Washington (as Avalanche); Great Barrier Reef (as Shark)
- Trained by: Giant Baba; Jumbo Tsuruta; The Great Kabuki; Terry Gordy
- Debut: 1987
- Retired: 2004

Kototenzan Toshimitsu
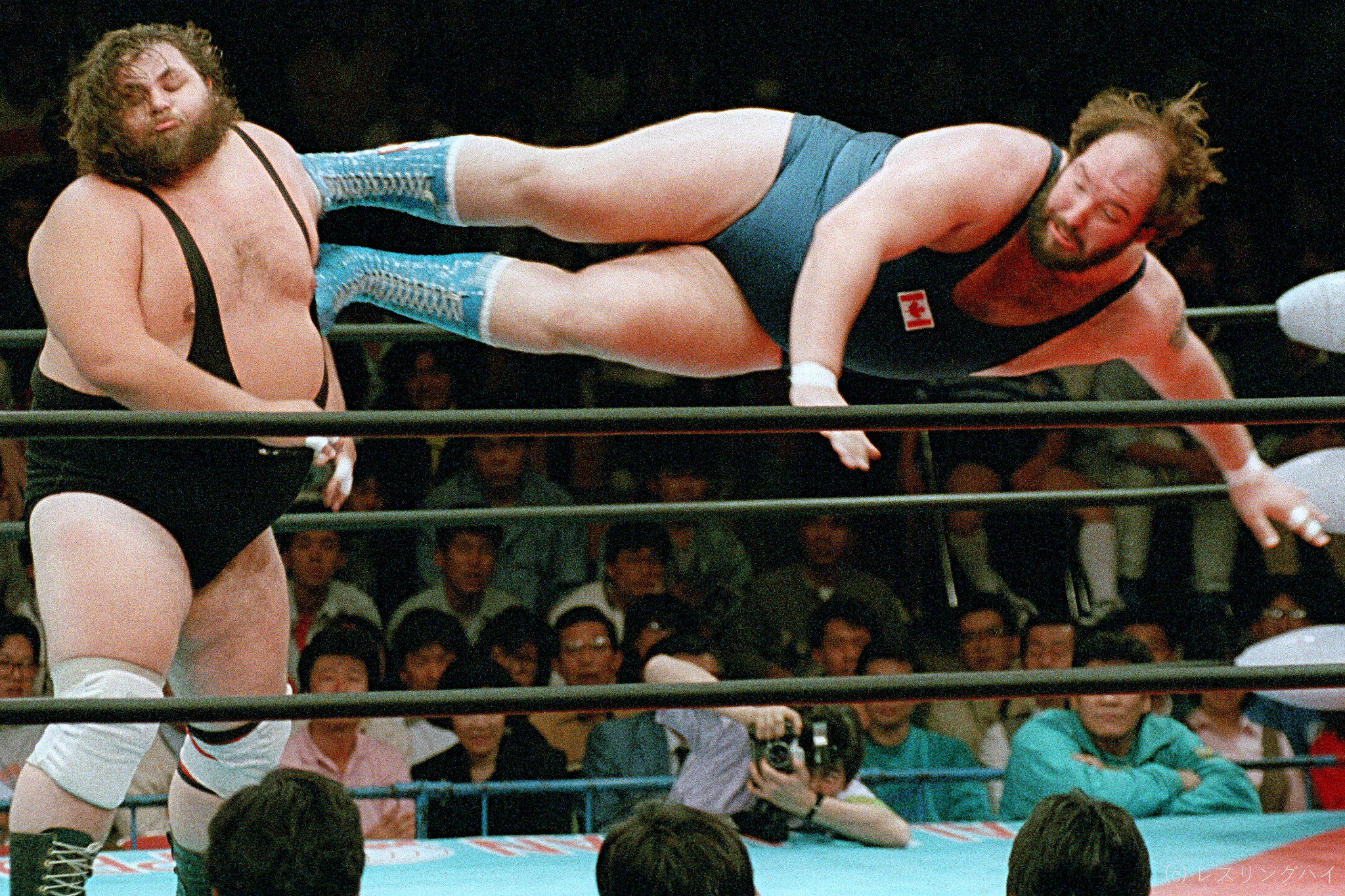
- Tenta as Kototenzan in 1986

Personal information
- Native name: 琴天山 俊光
- Height: 1.97 m (6 ft 5 1/2 in)
- Weight: 192 kg (423 lb; 30.2 st)

Sport
- Sport: Sumo
- Retired: July 1986
- Heya: Sadogatake
- Record: 21–0–7
- Debut: November 1985
- Highest rank: Makushita 43 (July 1986)
- Championships: 1 (Sandanme); 1 (Jonidan); 1 (Jonokuchi)
- Updated on May 2013

John Anthony Tenta Jr. (June 22, 1963 – June 7, 2006) was a Canadian professional wrestler and sumo wrestler best known for his work in the World Wrestling Federation as Earthquake.

After a promising start to his sumo career, using the name Kototenzan, Tenta switched to professional wrestling and became a high-profile star for the WWF, feuding with Hulk Hogan and winning the WWF Tag Team Championship as a member of The Natural Disasters with personal friend Typhoon.

His professional wrestling career also encompassed runs in World Championship Wrestling, where he was known as Avalanche and The Shark, All Japan Pro Wrestling and a return to WWF as Golga. Tenta died in 2006 after a long battle with bladder cancer.

Tenta, as Earthquake, was posthumously inducted into the WWE Hall of Fame Class of 2025 alongside Typhoon as The Natural Disasters.

== Early life ==
John Tenta was born in Surrey, British Columbia. Named after his father, he was a large baby weighing 11 pounds, 3 ounces at birth. Inspired by professional wrestlers Gene Kiniski and Don Leo Jonathan, Tenta decided to pursue wrestling at age 6. He learned freestyle wrestling at North Surrey Secondary, becoming a Canadian junior champion in 1981. Shortly after his 18th birthday, he finished sixth in the super-heavyweight category at the World Junior Wrestling Championships in Vancouver. Tenta won an athletic scholarship to Louisiana State University (LSU), where he competed in NCAA-level collegiate wrestling. At LSU he was nicknamed "Big John" Tenta, lettering on the Tiger varsity wrestling team and participating on the football team. LSU dropped varsity wrestling to comply with Title IX in 1985, forcing Tenta to choose a new sport. Tenta subsequently walked on to the LSU football team, where he participated as a defensive tackle in a few junior varsity contests. While working as a bouncer at The Bengal, a bar near the LSU campus, he was also referred to as a "silent giant". Tenta also played rugby union for the LSU Rugby Club.

== Sumo career ==
Tenta then moved to Japan to pursue a career in sumo after being recruited by a former yokozuna who met Tenta on a trip to Vancouver. In October 1985, he joined a sumo stable, Sadogatake, run by former yokozuna Kotozakura Masakatsu (his stable also produced ōzeki Kotoōshū Katsunori from Bulgaria). Following tradition, the young sumōtori took the shikona name of Kototenta Toshikatsu (琴天太 俊克; Koto + Tenta), surname translated as Tenta the Harp.

Beginning the sport at age 22, he entered nearly seven years later than many non-college aspirants. The combination of his size—he already weighed 423 pounds (192 kg) at a height of 6 ft 5.75 in (197.49 cm)—and training as a wrestler were to his advantage in learning and advancing in the sport. The novice won all of his 24 bouts in his eight-month active career, and was later renamed Kototenzan Toshimitsu (琴天山 俊光), surname meaning Heavenly Mountain Harp. The novelty of being a rare Westerner rikishi in the mid-1980s, and the third-ever White man, garnered him press coverage, and he earned the additional nickname of the "Canadian Comet".

Despite doing well as a newcomer he soon quit the sport due to the difficulty of the sumo lifestyle and the toll the hard ring surface was taking on his body. Tenta commented, "Nothing I have ever done – not football, not college wrestling – compares with the kind of physical abuse you inflict on your body in sumo." In addition, the sumo world frowned on the large tattoo of a tiger on his left biceps and, though he covered it during matches, would have required him to remove it via skin graft before moving up to the higher-level competitions. In Japan, tattoos are associated with gangsters, and public display is widely prohibited. Tenta's decision to quit was criticized by his stablemaster, while the head of the Japan Sumo Association Kasugano (the former yokozuna Tochinishiki), said Tenta had become arrogant after his run of consecutive victories. "He thought it would be easy. But there is no job in this world that is harder. It is better for him to leave." His promising but short-lived career as a rikishi ended without a single professional loss, a highly unusual occurrence, and 21 consecutive wins from bottom division, a rare feat still to this day.

=== Sumo career record ===
Kototenzan Toshimitsu
Year	January Hatsu basho, Tokyo	March Haru basho, Osaka	May Natsu basho, Tokyo	July Nagoya basho, Nagoya	September Aki basho, Tokyo	November Kyūshū basho, Fukuoka
1985	x	x	x	x	x	(Maezumō)
1986	West Jonokuchi #40; 7–0; Champion	East Jonidan #54; 7–0–P; Champion	West Sandanme #53; 7–0; Champion	East Makushita #43; Retired –	x	x
Record given as wins–losses–absences Top division champion Top division runner-up Retired Non-participation Jūryō Lower divisions Sanshō key: F=Fighting spirit; O=Outstanding performance; T=Technique Also shown: ★=Kinboshi; P=Playoff(s); Divisions: Makuuchi — Jūryō — Makushita — Sandanme — Jonidan — Jonokuchi Makuuchi ranks: Yokozuna — Ōzeki — Sekiwake — Komusubi — Maegashira

== Professional wrestling career ==
=== All Japan Pro Wrestling (1987–1989) ===
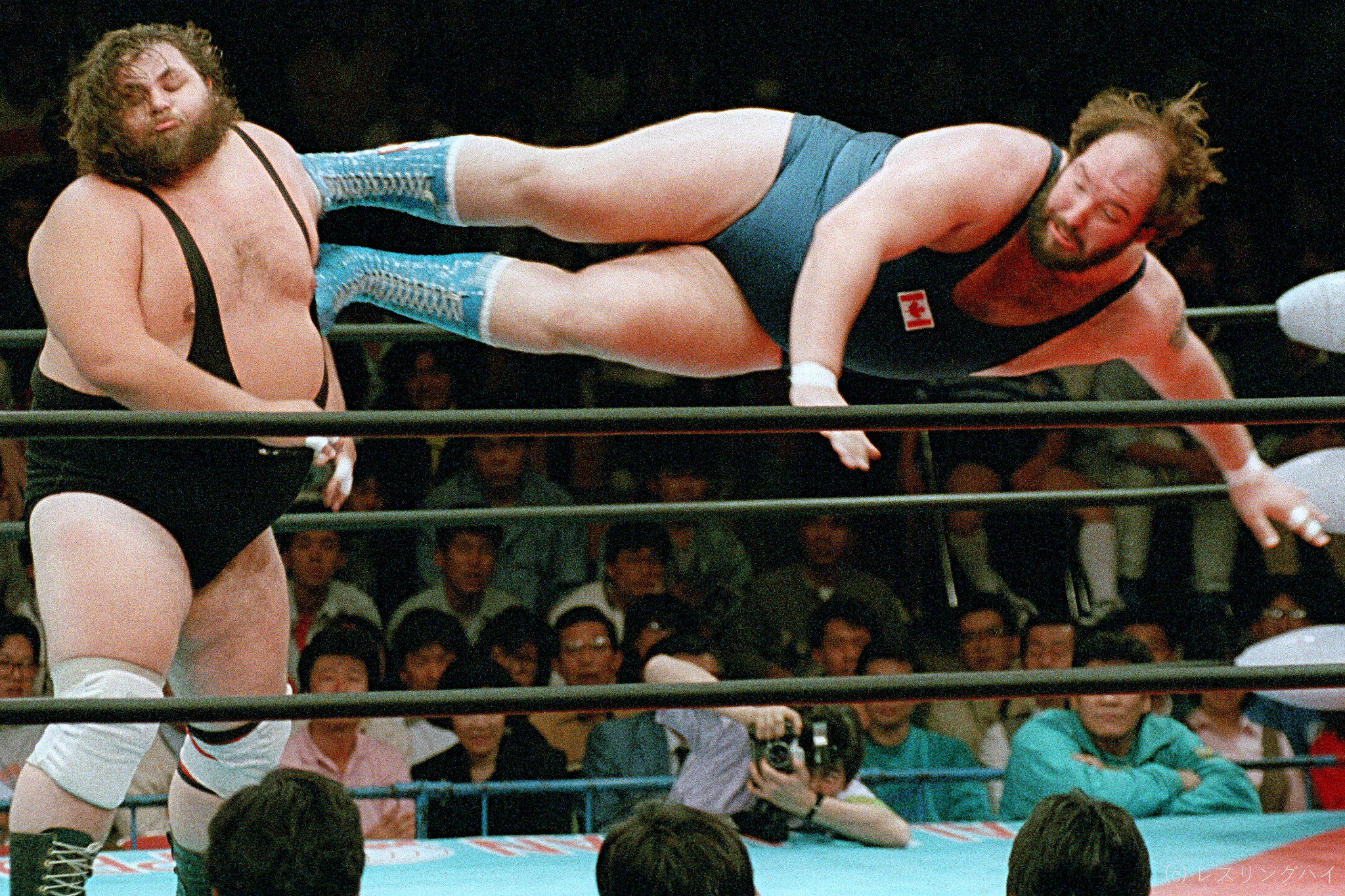
John Tenta (right) in All-Japan Pro Wrestling

After leaving sumo, he quickly signed up for puroresu (Japanese pro wrestling) under the tutelage of Shohei "Giant" Baba. He made his professional wrestling debut with All Japan Pro Wrestling on May 1, 1987, teaming with Giant Baba and defeating Rusher Kimura and Goro Tsurumi. Tenta had a solid 18-month career, teaming with Baba, Jumbo Tsuruta, and The Great Kabuki, before getting the attention of American pro-wrestling promoters, as well as making tours in Vancouver for Al Tomko's NWA All Star Wrestling where he first competed as a babyface, but later turned heel when he began being managed by "Gentleman" Jonathan Sayers. Tenta left AJPW in September 1989.

=== World Wrestling Federation (1989–1993, 1994) ===
==== Various feuds (1989–1991) ====
After making two dark-match appearances under his real name in March 1989, Tenta joined the WWF full-time in September 1989. In his first match after signing on, a dark match on September 21, 1989, he portrayed a lumberjack character named Earthquake Evans that was billed as being from the "Northern Yukon Territory" who was managed by Slick, and defeated Paul Roma. Tenta then made his WWF television debut on the November 11, 1989, edition of WWF Superstars of Wrestling, where he was planted in the audience as a normal spectator at the taping held in Wheeling, West Virginia. During an in-ring interview with Gene Okerlund, Dino Bravo challenged Ultimate Warrior to a strength competition. In order to demonstrate, Bravo and manager Jimmy Hart suggested that they pick a random audience member to come into the ring and sit on the backs of Bravo and Ultimate Warrior as they did push-ups to see who could do the most. Ultimate Warrior agreed, and Hart, after pretending to look around the audience, centered his attention on the very large Tenta who was sitting in the audience in casual clothing and appearing surprised. Tenta came down into the ring, identified himself as "John from West Virginia" and proceeded to sit on Bravo's back as he did a set of push-ups. During Ultimate Warrior's set, however, Tenta leapt down onto the prone Ultimate Warrior using a seated senton that was adapted to be his signature move. Bravo and Tenta then beat and unleashed multiple big splashes on the prone Warrior. Both then celebrated as Tenta was inaugurated into the WWF as a heel with Hart as his manager. Tenta was pushed as The Canadian Earthquake – and by WrestleMania VI, simply Earthquake – an unstoppable monster heel who often sent his opponents out on a stretcher after repeatedly hitting them with his sitdown splash. In addition to wrestling, Earthquake also served as a bodyguard for Bravo.

Earthquake's first PPV appearance was when he replaced Barry Windham on Randy Savage's team at the 1989 Survivor Series. Earthquake eliminated Hercules and survived the match, along with Savage and Dino Bravo. He made his WrestleMania debut at WrestleMania VI, defeating Hercules. Tenta's career peaked when he entered a feud with Hulk Hogan. The feud exploded in May 1990, when Earthquake sneaked up on Hogan from behind during a segment of The Brother Love Show (on WWF Superstars of Wrestling) and repeatedly crushed Hogan's ribs with his "Earthquake splash". It was reported that Earthquake had injured Hogan so severely that he may have to give up wrestling, Tugboat Thomas urged a letter writing campaign to fans to write to support Hogan while he recovered. Eventually, Hogan recovered and gained revenge on Earthquake and defeated him in a series of matches across the country, starting with Hogan's countout victory at SummerSlam 1990. Hogan and Earthquake were the final two participants in the 1991 Royal Rumble, with Hogan getting the victory. After his stint with Hogan, Earthquake attained another WrestleMania victory, defeating former Hart stable mate Greg Valentine at WrestleMania VII. On April 1, 1991, WWF held a joint show in Kobe with Japanese promotion Super World of Sports called SWS Wrestle Dream. Earthquake appeared to face Kōji Kitao, in a battle of two former sumo wrestlers. Kitao and Tenta broke kayfabe by being uncooperative with each other. Kitao did not sell Earthquake's attacks and shot on him. The match ended when Kitao was disqualified for kicking the referee. After the match, Kitao immediately grabbed a microphone and began telling the audience that wrestling is fake and that Tenta never could really beat him, as other Japanese wrestlers attempted to restrain him. The incident led to Kitao being fired from SWS.

After WrestleMania VII, Earthquake instigated a feud with Jake "the Snake" Roberts, when in their match that aired on WWF Superstars of Wrestling, he "squashed" Damien with his Earthquake splashes; Earthquake had tied up Roberts in the ropes before going on his rampage. In reality, Roberts' bag – one of two left at ringside for the match – contained pantyhose stuffed with hamburger, and a small motor to simulate a "live snake". When the match aired on WWF Superstars of Wrestling, footage of Earthquake landing on Damien was interrupted with cutaway shots to that show's "Events Center", although the incident aired uninterrupted and uncensored during WWF Prime Time Wrestling the following week. Later, Earthquake participated in a skit on WWF Prime Time Wrestling where he cooked "Quakeburgers" on a grill and served them to co-hosts Vince McMahon, Bobby The Brain Heenan, and Lord Alfred Hayes; later, Earthquake revealed that the meat was ground from Damien's carcass. Heenan had already eaten three or four of the Burgers and Hayes was curious about the meat. Earthquake mentioned the animal from which the meat was from rhymed with quake, and Hayes said they were snake burgers. Hayes got sick and nearly threw up. McMahon was angry over this and knocked the tray out of Earthquake's hands which knocked all the burgers onto the floor. Roberts and Earthquake feuded throughout most of late spring and into the summer.

==== Natural Disasters (1991–1993) ====
Later in 1991, Earthquake formed a tag team with Typhoon (Tenta's friend, Fred Ottman, who had previously wrestled as Tugboat before turning heel) called The Natural Disasters, managed by Jimmy Hart. Initially a heel tag team, the duo feuded with the Legion of Doom over the WWF World Tag Team Championship, but were unsuccessful. Later, the Disasters turned face when Jimmy Hart betrayed them and joined forces with Money Inc., a team composed of Irwin R. Schyster and Ted DiBiase; Money Inc. had just won the tag titles from the Legion of Doom, and at WrestleMania VIII, they defeated Money Inc. by count-out but did not win the titles. Although Earthquake and Typhoon eventually won the tag titles (and defeated the Beverly Brothers at the 1992 SummerSlam pay-per-view to retain the titles), it was not long before Money Inc. regained the belts. Tenta left the WWF in January 1993 after losing via count-out to Bam Bam Bigelow the night after the Royal Rumble for a spell in Japan for WAR. He also had a brief stint in CMLL in late 1993.

==== Singles run and departure (1994) ====
He returned to the WWF in January 1994 when he assisted Bret Hart in a match with Shawn Michaels by countering Diesel's interference. He defeated Adam Bomb in a quick squash match at WrestleMania X. He then engaged in a short feud with Yokozuna, with whom he had a sumo match on Raw (the early days of Tenta's Sumo training were also revealed). Tenta won the sumo match. Earthquake was scheduled to face Owen Hart in a King of the Ring qualifying match. However, during a May 14, 1994 house show in San Jose, California, Earthquake had been injured by Yokozuna and Crush. Footage of Yokozuna hitting a Banzai Drop at the show was televised before the qualifying match to explain his absence in which Doink the Clown was his replacement. He again disappeared from WWF thereafter and returned to Japan for WAR.

=== World Championship Wrestling (1994–1997, 1999) ===
==== Avalanche (1994–1995) ====
Personal financial difficulties led Tenta to contact World Championship Wrestling. Hulk Hogan, a longtime friend, lobbied to have Tenta come in, and so Tenta left the WWF to join WCW. Before joining WCW, Tenta worked a tour of Japan for UWF International, where he teamed up with Super Vader. Tenta was introduced as Avalanche and was a member of Kevin Sullivan's The Three Faces of Fear, billed at 517 lbs. He later aligned with Big Bubba Rogers and feuded with Sting and Randy Savage. At Clash of the Champions XXIX, Avalanche, The Butcher and Kevin Sullivan lost to Hulk Hogan, Sting and Dave Sullivan in a Six-Man Tag Team match with Mr. T as the special referee. At Starrcade, Avalanche lost to Sting by disqualification. At SuperBrawl V, Avalanche and Big Bubba Rogers lost to Sting and Randy Savage when Sting pinned Avalanche. At Uncensored, Avalanche lost to Randy Savage by disqualification. At Clash of the Champions XXX, Avalanche lost to Sting with The Guardian Angel as the special guest referee. The Avalanche name was dropped in April 1995 after WWF threatened legal action over similarities to the Earthquake character.

==== The Shark (1995–1996) ====
In June 1995, Tenta returned under the ring name The Shark and joined the Dungeon of Doom faction. He believed this could be the beginning of a long term gimmick and even changed the tattoo on his arm of an Louisiana State University Tiger to that of a shark, a process that took 24 hours. Rumors were that WCW management forced him to do that, but in reality, it was Tenta himself that brought the idea up. At Fall Brawl (1995), Tenta teamed with other members of The Dungeon of Doom (Kamala, The Zodiac and Meng with The Taskmaster) to face The Hulkamaniacs (Hulk Hogan, Randy Savage, Lex Luger and Sting) in a WarGames match where they lost. On the October 9, 1995, edition of WCW Monday Nitro, Shark lost to Sting in a match for the WCW United States Heavyweight Championship. on the November 20 episode of Nitro, Shark lost to Scott Norton. Shark competed in the WCW World War 3 (60 Man Battle Royal in Three Rings) for the vacant WCW World Heavyweight Championship which was won by Randy Savage.

Tenta eventually left the Dungeon of Doom and wrestled under his real name after delivering a promo about the many other names and gimmicks he'd been forced into in the past, including the line "I'm not the Shark. I'm not a fish. I'm not an Avalanche. I'm a man". On the May 27 episode of Nitro, Shark lost to The Giant in a match for the WCW World Heavyweight Championship.

==== Final appearances (1996–1997; 1999) ====
In May 1996, Tenta began wrestling under his real name. On the June 3 episode of Nitro, Tenta defeated Big Bubba Rogers by count-out. At the 1996 Great American Bash, he defeated Big Bubba Rogers; after the match Tenta cut Rogers' goatee off with a pair of scissors. On the June 17 episode of Nitro, Tenta defeated Big Bubba. On the July 1, 1996 edition of Nitro, Tenta got another shot at the WCW World Heavyweight Championship against The Giant but failed to win the title. At Bash at the Beach 1996, Tenta defeated Big Bubba in a Carson City Silver Dollar match. During this time, Tenta began using "One Crazed Anarchist" as his entrance theme, which would later be adopted by Chris Jericho. Following a match with the Dungeon of Doom's Giant, Big Bubba Rogers, who had just joined the Dungeon, shaved half of Tenta's head. Tenta said he would not shave off the other half because he looked in the mirror and relived the embarrassment. He would go out to get the mail and his neighbors would laugh. The two went on to feud against one another, with Rogers shaving off Tenta's beard as well after Tenta lost another match to The Giant.

On the September 9 episode of Nitro, Tenta defeated Randy Savage by count-out. on the September 15 episode of WCW WorldWide, Tenta lost to Konnan. on the November 2 episode of WCW Saturday Night, Tenta lost to Jeff Jarrett in Tenta's last WCW match.

On the March 3, 1997, episode of Nitro, Tenta joined Roddy Piper as a member of his "family". On the March 10 episode of Nitro, Piper instead joined forces with the Four Horsemen, dropping the members of his "family". Tenta left WCW in early 1997.

In 1999, Tenta returned to WCW for one night wrestling under his real name when he defeated Lash LeRoux on July 26, 1999 episode of Monday Nitro in a dark match.

=== Return to WWF (1998–1999; 2001) ===
Tenta left WCW and resurfaced in the WWF on the May 25, 1998, episode of Raw is War under the name Golga. He wrestled under a gold mask as one of the Oddities and the character had a fascination with Eric Cartman from the TV series South Park. The gimmick was given to Tenta because he lost a considerable amount of weight, so much so that the WWF thought it would not be believable for Tenta to reprise the Earthquake gimmick with the weight loss.

On the July 28 edition of Raw is War, he defeated Marc Mero. At SummerSlam, The Oddities defeated Kaientai (Taka Michinoku, Dick Togo, Mens Teioh and Sho Funaki) in a Handicap match. On the September 5 edition of Raw Saturday Night Raw, The Oddities defeated the L.O.D and Droz in a six-man tag team match. On the September 12 edition of Raw Saturday Night, The Oddities faced The Disciples of Apocalypse which ended in a No Contest when the top ring rope fell off. On the October 4 edition of Heat, The Oddities defeated The Headbangers. On the October 17 edition of Shotgun Saturday Night, Golga and Kurrgan defeated Too Much. On the October 18 edition of Heat, The Oddities defeated Los Boricuas (Jose Estrada, Miguel Pérez, Jr. and Jesus Castillo). On the October 25 edition of Heat, Golga lost to Jeff Jarrett. On the October 26 edition of Raw is War, The Oddities and Insane Clown Posse lost to Kaientai in an 8-man tag team match by DQ when ICP shoved the referee. On November 16 edition of Raw, The Oddities lost to D-Generation X (New Age Outlaws and X-Pac). On the November 23 edition of Raw is War, The Oddities were defeated by The Headbangers when the Insane Clown Posse turned on them. At Rock Bottom: In Your House, which took place in Tenta's hometown of Vancouver, The Oddities (Golga and Kurrgan) lost to The Headbangers.

On the January 10, 1999 edition of Heat The Oddities (Golga and Kurrgan) got their revenge and defeated The Headbangers. Throughout the rest of January and February, The Oddities would lose to Too Much and The Disciples of Apocalypse on Heat and Shotgun Saturday Night. At the 1999 Royal Rumble, Golga competed in the Royal Rumble match entering at number 3 and quickly eliminated by Steve Austin. The last appearance of The Oddities was on the February 28, 1999 edition of Heat after the Ministry of Darkness beat them down when Kurrgan lost to The Undertaker, with all Oddities members being released.

Tenta did, however, return to the WWF with the Earthquake gimmick for a pair of appearances in 2001. In April he competed in the 20 Man Gimmick Battle Royal match at WrestleMania X-Seven eliminated by Kamala and won by The Iron Sheik, while in December he defeated Tank Meloche in a dark match prior to a taping of SmackDown!.

=== Independent circuit (1999–2002) ===
After leaving WWF, Tenta wrestled on the independent circuit, also working in England and Canada.

=== All Japan Pro Wrestling (2002–2003) ===
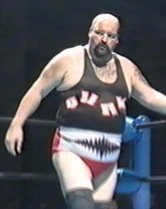
By 2003 Tenta looked unrecognisable due to his significant weight loss.

He returned to All Japan Pro Wrestling (AJPW) in November 2002 where he finished up his career in July 2003, being a part of the company's Pro Wrestling Love era. At this time, Tenta (dressed in his Earthquake singlet) became a top gaijin during the transition period of owner Mrs. Baba selling the company to Keiji Muto. Tenta rose up the card after "Dr. Death" Steve Williams left the company in January 2003, also the month Mrs. Baba permanently left and the new ownership fully in effect. Throughout 2003, Tenta had storyline feuds and matches against Keiji Muto and Mike Awesome, and Tenta would frequently team with Gigantes (Jerry Tuite), who went to All Japan after his independent circuit run as Malice ended. Tenta would also wrestle in hardcore matches during his second run in AJPW.

== Illness, death and legacy ==
Tenta retired from wrestling in 2004 after it was revealed that he had developed bladder cancer and was given a 20% chance to live, assuming he continued with his chemotherapy treatments. During his November 18, 2005 interview on WrestleCrap Radio, Tenta announced that a recent radiation dosage did not go as planned, and had no effect on the tumor. He also announced that multiple tumors had spread to his lungs. On June 7, 2006, Tenta died of bladder cancer, just 15 days shy of his 43rd birthday. The first public notice of his death was posted on WWE.com on the same day. On the June 9, 2006, edition of SmackDown!, and the June 12, 2006, edition of Raw, WWE showed a bumper that read "In Memory of 'Earthquake' John Tenta" 1963–2006 before each show began.

On March 6, 2025, it was announced that Tenta will be posthumously inducted into the 2025 WWE Hall of Fame, alongside his friend and tag team partner Fred Ottman, under their The Natural Disasters gimmick. His daughter Joanna Tenta Sowards and son John Anthony Tenta III joined Ottman for their Hall of Fame induction.

== Persona outside the ring ==
Despite Tenta's angry behavior in the ring and being a brutal monster heel who sent wrestlers to the hospital, Bret "The Hitman" Hart stated that Tenta's persona was completely different from his in-ring persona. According to Hart, he was a very quiet man and extremely polite. In fact, he called wrestlers "sir" and "ma'am":

"For me, John Tenta - Earthquake. When he first came in, he was this massive 6’ 8’’ 450-pound guy yet he was this quiet, demure gentle giant who said please and thank you to everyone and called everyone 'sir.'

He came in and was pushed as this brutal monster heel, who sent everyone to the hospital and put Hogan down on television, which upset millions of kids. Yet backstage, John hated being a heel. He loved children and he loved playing with them and having them sit on his knee, yet when he would go to airports and have kids crying and running away from him, it actually really upset him!

When Quake turned face in 1992, the world saw the real John Tenta. The smile when he would come to the ring, the cheers he got from everyone and when the kids finally saw him as a good guy, it warmed his heart. When he won the tag titles, the look of elation on his face was so pure and genuine. When he finally got to be the good guy outside the ring, he really loved the reaction he got and backstage everyone in the back respected the hell out of John and we were all crushed when he passed away." - Bret Hart

According to some sumo publications, former sumo wrestlers rejected what Kasugano said about Tenta. Many wrestlers stated that Kasugano pushed him over his limit and that he was always very friendly to those around him.

== Other media ==
John Tenta's professional wrestling career garnered him appearances in several video games. In 1991, Tenta as Earthquake was portrayed as a feature character in Technos' popular arcade video game WWF WrestleFest. He was also included in the 1992 home video game WWF Super WrestleMania by LJN for the Super Nintendo Entertainment System (he was not in the Sega Genesis version). In 2004, the Japanese video game developer Spike released King of Colosseum II, a puroresu-wrestling game for PlayStation 2 that featured Tenta as a playable character; it was a Japan-only release. On April 14, 2009, Tenta was announced as downloadable content for WWE SmackDown vs. Raw 2009 which was released April 16, 2009. On February 23, 2016, he along with Typhoon appeared as downloadable content for WWE 2K16. He also appeared in WWE 2K17 as well as WWE 2K18 along with Typhoon.

== Championships and accomplishments ==
- All Japan Pro Wrestling
  - January 2 Korakuen Hall Heavyweight Battle Royal (1988)
  - World's Strongest Tag Determination League Fine Play Award (1988) – with Shunji Takano
- NWA All-Star Wrestling
  - NWA Canadian Heavyweight Championship (Vancouver version) (1 time)
  - UWA Heavyweight Championship (Vancouver version) (2 times)
- Pro Wrestling Illustrated
  - PWI Most Hated Wrestler of the Year (1990)
  - PWI ranked him No. 40 of the 500 best singles wrestlers of the year in the PWI 500 in 1992
- Super World of Sports
  - SWS Tag Team Championship (1 time) – with Typhoon
- Tokyo Sports
  - Rookie of the Year (1987)
- World Wrestling Federation
  - WWF Tag Team Championship (1 time) – with Typhoon
  - WWE Hall of Fame (Class of 2025) – as a member of The Natural Disasters
- Wrestling Observer Newsletter
  - Worst Tag Team (1998) with Kurrgan
  - Worst Gimmick (1998) as Golga, as part of The Oddities
  - Worst Feud of the Year (1996) vs. Big Bubba Rogers

== See also ==
- List of non-Japanese sumo wrestlers
- List of premature professional wrestling deaths
