= George Takano =

American-Japanese professional wrestler

Personal information
- Born: June 23, 1958 (age 68) Yamaguchi, Yamaguchi, Japan
- Family: Shunji Takano (brother)

Professional wrestling career
- Ring name(s): George Takano; The Cobra; Mr. X
- Billed height: 1.85 m (6 ft 1 in)
- Billed weight: 115 kg (254 lb)
- Billed from: Uganda (as The Cobra)
- Trained by: Tokyo Joe
- Debut: February 10, 1977
- Retired: April 21, 2018

Joji Takano (高野 讓治, Takano Jōji), born June 23, 1958, is an American-Japanese retired professional wrestler better known under the ring name George Takano (ジョージ高野, Jōji Takano). He was also billed from Uganda under the alias The Cobra, a masked wrestler persona. He worked for various Japanese and American wrestling promotions from the late 1970s to early 1990s. He is the older brother of Shunji Takano.

== Early life ==
Takano was born on June 23, 1958. His father was an African American Marine who belonged to the Iwakuni base, and has also become a promising boxer. However, his father returned to the United States and left his wife, a Japanese woman, and children in Japan. Takano grew up at home with his mother and brother, and he was a mixed-blooded child. He was introduced at the age of 15 to the grand sumo room of sumo wrestling, and set foot for the first time in a dojo in March 1974, but in January 1976 the place becomes out of numbering and goes out of business.

== Professional wrestling career ==
Takano debuted in 1977 and worked for Stampede Wrestling, winning its British Commonwealth Mid-Heavyweight Championship in September 1983. A mere two months later, he defeated Davey Boy Smith for the vacated NWA World Junior Heavyweight Championship. Still working under the ringname "The Cobra", Takano performed in the World Wrestling Federation throughout the early and mid-1980s. In December 1984, he defeated Dynamite Kid for its Junior Heavyweight Championship. The following title loss to Hiro Saito was redeemed in July 1985, the same month that he lost and then won back the NWA World Junior Heavyweight title in the same night against the very same man, Saito. In October that year, his WWF title was vacated when New Japan Pro-Wrestling separated from WWF. He would lose the tournament final to determine the inaugural IWGP Junior Heavyweight Champion against Shiro Koshinaka in June 1986. It was during 1986, he removed the mask and began wrestling as "George Takano". He went on to win the IWGP Tag Team Championship with Super Strong Machine in March 1989, before losing the titles to Riki Choshu and Takayuki Iizuka nearly four months later.

He would then join the Super World of Sports in July 1990, which had a partnership contract with WWF. During their interpromotional events throughout 1991, he would face the likes Randy Savage, Rick Martel, Tito Santana, and Legion of Doom, and scored wins against WWF superstar Bret Hart and, while teaming with his younger brother Shunji, The Rockers, Demolition, and The Samoan Swat Team. His last major career highlight would come one year later when he won the SWS Tag Team titles with his younger brother Shunji, only to lose them the very next night to The Natural Disasters of WWF fame. SWS folded in June 1992, with the Takano brothers venturing into Pro Wrestling Crusaders.

Despite quietly retiring from active competition in 2004, Takano maintains his place in professional wrestling today as he runs his own promotion, Fighting Spirit Wrestling (FSR), which is based in Hokkaidō.

He came out of retirement in 2007, 2013 and most recently 2018.

== Championships and accomplishments ==
- New Japan Pro-Wrestling
  - IWGP Tag Team Championship (1 time) - with Super Strong Machine
  - NWA World Junior Heavyweight Championship (2 times)
  - WWF Junior Heavyweight Championship (1 times)
- Stampede Wrestling
  - Stampede British Commonwealth Mid-Heavyweight Championship (1 time)
- Super World of Sports
  - SWS Tag Team Championship (1 time) - with Shunji Takano
  - One Night Tournament (1990)
- Tokyo Sports
  - Effort Award (1980)
- World Wrestling Federation
  - WWF Junior Heavyweight Championship (1 time)
- Wrestling Observer Newsletter
  - Most Improved (1984)
