= Fumihiro Niikura =

Japanese professional wrestler

Personal information
- Born: August 23, 1957 (age 68) Yokohama, Japan

Professional wrestling career
- Ring name(s): Fumihiro Niikura; Viet Cong Express 2
- Billed height: 185 cm (6 ft 1 in)
- Billed weight: 108 kg (238 lb)
- Trained by: NJPW Dojo
- Debut: 1981
- Retired: 1993

Fumihiro Niikura (八木 宏; born August 23, 1957), is a Japanese retired professional wrestler, manager, promoter and actor. He is best known for his tenures in New Japan Pro Wrestling (NJPW), All Japan Pro Wrestling (AJPW), Super World Sports (SWS) and Stampede Wrestling in Canada.

== Career ==
Niikura made his debut in 1981 for New Japan Pro Wrestling where he spent a few years there. In 1984, Niikura switched to All Japan Pro Wrestling and Japan Pro Wrestling.

Then in 1986, Niikura made his debut in North America for Stampede Wrestling in Calgary, Canada teaming with Japanese Hiroshi Hase as the Viet Cong Express. He was known as Viet Cong Express 2. They would feud with Owen Hart, Ben Bassarab, and Brian Pillman. In August 1986, they won the Stampede International Tag Team Championship defeating Owen Hart and Ben Bassarab. They would vacate the titles in January 1987 after Niikura suffered a heart attack a month prior. He would leave the territory and take a hiatus. Originally, Masanori Morimura was supposed to replace Niikura as Hase's partner, but suffered a cerebral hemorrhage in March 1987, and he was replaced by Shinji Sasazaki.

In 1990, Niikura returned to wrestling in Japan for the newly Super World Sports. He worked there until 1992.

In 1992, he worked in Japan's Network Of Wrestling. In 1993, he retired form wrestling.

== Championships and accomplishments ==
- Stampede Wrestling
  - Stampede International Tag Team Championship (1 time) – with Hiroshi Hase

== See also ==
- Professional wrestling in Japan
