= A Hot Summer Night II =

1986 National Wrestling Alliance supercard event

A Hot Summer Night
- Promotion(s): National Wrestling Alliance; NWA Polynesian Pro Wrestling
- Date: August 9, 1986
- City: Honolulu, Hawaii
- Venue: Aloha Stadium
- Attendance: 1,900

A Hot Summer Night chronology
| ← Previous; A Hot Summer Night | Next → Last event |

A Hot Summer Night II was a professional wrestling supercard produced by NWA Polynesian Pro Wrestling (NWA-PPW), which took place on August 9, 1986, at the Aloha Stadium in Honolulu, Hawaii. Like the original show, this was an interpromotional event and featured representatives from All Star Pro Wrestling, the Continental Wrestling Association, Championship Wrestling from Florida, New Japan Pro-Wrestling and Stampede Wrestling.

Sixteen professional wrestling matches were set on the event's supercard, four of which were for championships. The scheduled main event was supposed to be NWA Polynesian Pacific Heavyweight Champion Superfly Tui defending his title against challenger Lars Anderson in a Steel Cage match; however, a second main event was added after a surprise appearance by The Sheik who interrupted a $22,000 Bodyslam Challenge between Bruiser Brody and Grizzly Smith. As a result, Brody and Smith agreed to a temporary truce so they could face The Sheik, Mark Lewin and Prince Kamalamala in a six-man tag team barbed wire match, which ended in a no contest. The undercard included a singles match between Antonio Inoki and Hacksaw Higgins, which Inoki won via disqualification. Also, defending NWA British Commonwealth Champion Steve Rickard retained his title against Jerry Lawler, Bad News Allen beat Alexis Smirnoff in a Judo Jacket match, and The Samoan Connection (Farmer Boy Ipo and Leroy Brown) defeated The Maxx Brothers (Madd Maxx and Super Maxx) to win the NWA Polynesian Pacific Tag Team Championship.

Several matches from A Hot Summer Night II were broadcast on the promotion's syndicated television program Polynesian Pacific Pro Wrestling from August to October 1986. The show was also to have been aired by Superstars of Wrestling in Atlanta, Georgia via a live satellite feed. The show's host, Joe Pedicino, was present at the supercard serving as both a backstage interviewer and guest commentator for the main event. Technical difficulties prevented the event from airing on Superstars which instead showed highlights the following week. Celebrity guests included powerlifting champion Jeff Magruder, television actor Al Harrington as ring announcer, and Lieutenant Governor of American Samoa Eni Faleomavaega.

The event was attended by only 1,900 people, far less than the 12,500 which had turned out for the original show a year earlier, and was among the lowest drawing supercards of the 1980s wrestling boom. In addition to a severe rainstorm, last minute cancellations and "no shows" by a large number of participants had forced the promotion to make major changes to the advertised card. While the first installment had set an attendance record in Hawaii, the failure of this second supercard (as well as a disastrous tour of California) is blamed for the promotion's close less than two years later.

== Production ==
=== Background ===
NWA Polynesian Pro Wrestling was founded by Peter Maivia in 1979. Upon his death in 1982, Lia Maivia took control of the company becoming one of the few female wrestling promoters in the United States. Shortly after her husband's funeral, Vince McMahon Sr. reportedly assured Lia Miavia that he had no intentions of taking over the Hawaii wrestling territory. Within a few years, however, his son Vince Jr. had begun plans to expand the World Wrestling Federation across the United States. Maivia, who was then a vice president of the National Wrestling Alliance, was keenly aware of this fact. She too decided to try expanding outside of her home territory. Maivia's promotion had the benefit of having their weekly television program Polynesian Pro Wrestling shown across the country on SCORE. Unlike the other NWA members, she faced some unique challenges in this endeavor - namely the added expense of flying her wrestlers 2,500 miles to the mainland. Nevertheless, she pushed ahead with ambitious plans to run shows in Calgary, Juneau, Seattle, and parts of the Midwestern U.S. in March and April 1986. Maivia spent a considerable sum of money recruiting talent such as Jerry Lawler, Kevin Sullivan, Tatsumi Fujinami, and Jimmy Snuka. PPW's initial tour of California was unsuccessful with poorly attended live events in Los Angeles and San Luis Obispo. One show in San Jose drew as little as 25 people.

Meanwhile, the WWF made its Hawaii debut at the Blaisdell Center on July 10, 1986, drawing 5,000 people. With Vince McMahon Jr. now in her backyard, Miavia decided to counter with a sequel to A Hot Summer Night hoping to repeat the success of last year's event. It was also thought that another big supercard at Aloha Stadium would bring a desperately needed boost to the company as well as added revenue for future mainland tours. Working with booker Lars Anderson, A Hot Summer Night II boasted an even bigger lineup than the original show. Sixty wrestlers from eight different countries were to appear on the card with fourteen of the matches being for championships. In an interview with the Honolulu Star-Bulletin, Lia Maivia touted a six-man tag team barbed wire match pitting Bruiser Brody, Tommy Rich and Jeff Magruder against Kevin Sullivan, Mark Lewin and Prince Kamalamala as the featured main event.

| No. | Matches* | Stipulations |
|---|---|---|
| 1 | Debbie the Killer Tomato vs. Spice Williams | Singles match for the Hollywood Stunt Girls Championship |
| 2 | The Hart Brothers (Keith Hart and Owen Hart) vs. The Sheik and Vladimir Krupoff | Tag team match |
| 3 | El Canek vs. Dos Caras | Singles match |
| 4 | Bad News Allen vs. Alexis Smirnoff | Judo Jacket match |
| 5 | Keiji Muto vs. Jerry Grey | Singles match |
| 6 | Hans Schroeder vs. Uncle Elmer | Singles match |
| 7 | Seiji Sakaguchi vs. Johnny Mantel | Singles match |
| 8 | Chilly Bo Dilly vs. Little Kevin | Midget wrestling match |
| 9 | Mighty Milo vs. Jack Attack | Singles match |
| 10 | Richie Magnett vs. The Magnificent Malo | Singles match |
| 11 | Steve Rickard (c) vs. Larry O'Dea | Singles match for the NWA British Commonwealth Championship |
| 12 | Takeshi Oisi vs. Harris Montelo | Singles match |
| 13 | Jerry Lawler and Super Samoan Sakalia vs. Soo Hong Kim and Seung Hwi Yang | Tag team match |
| 14 | Bruiser Brody vs. Grizzly Smith | $22,000 Bodyslam Challenge |
| 15 | Joe Solo and The Kinipopos (Kinipopo #1 and Kinipopo #2) vs. Robert Toronto, Don Stevens and Peter Maivia Jr. | Six-man tag team match |
| 16 | Tatsumi Fujinami and Kengo Kimura vs. Kendo Nagasaki and Mr. Pogo | Tag team match for the IWGP Tag Team Championship |
| 17 | The Maxx Brothers (Madd Maxx and Super Maxx) (c) vs. The Samoan Connection (Farmer Boy Ipo and Leroy Brown) | Tag team match for the NWA Polynesian Pacific Tag Team Championship |
| 18 | Bruiser Brody, Tommy Rich and Jeff Magruder vs. Kevin Sullivan, Mark Lewin and Prince Kamalamala | Six-man tag team barbed wire match |
| 19 | Antonio Inoki vs. Hacksaw Higgins | Singles match |
| 20 | Superfly Tui (c) vs. Lars Anderson | Steel Cage match for the NWA Polynesian Pacific Heavyweight Championship |
(c) / – the champion(s) heading into the match; *Card subject to change

Many of these wrestlers, including Lia's kayfabe son Peter Maivia Jr., either cancelled or failed to appear on the night of the event. The promotion was forced to rebook the show at the last minute drastically altering the advertised card. Four matches were dropped from the event including the barbed wire match promoted in the Star-Bulletin only two days earlier.

=== Storylines ===
Four championships were defended at A Hot Summer Night II: the Hollywood Stunt Girls Championship, NWA British Commonwealth Championship, NWA Polynesian Pacific Heavyweight Championship and the NWA Polynesian Pacific Tag Team Championship. Prior to the event, Superfly Tui had feuded with Lars Anderson over the Heavyweight belt. Tui defeated Anderson on March 26, 1986 for the championship. The Maxx Brothers (Madd Maxx and Super Maxx) had won the NWA Polynesian Tag Team Championship six weeks before A Hot Summer Night II from The Samoan Connection (Farmer Boy Ipo and Leroy Brown).

As this was an interpromotional event, storylines from other NWA-affiliated promotions were also part of the show. New Japan Pro-Wrestling was the most prominently featured as its wrestlers made up the majority of the top-tier undercard bouts. On the weekend of the event, the Japanese media captured an altercation between Antonio Inoki and Bruiser Brody that occurred on a Honolulu beach. While the incident was used to generate publicity for an upcoming showdown in Osaka the following month, there was a legitimate dispute between the two men over money Brody felt Inoki owed him for a previous Japanese tour.

== Event ==
Other on-screen employees
| Role: | Name: |
|---|---|
| Commentator | Dunbar Wakayama |
| Commentator | Ripper Collins |
| Commentator | Joe Pedicino (Main event) |
| Interviewer | Sonny Ross |
| Interviewer | Joe Pedicino |
| Interviewer | Richie Magnett |
| Ring announcer | Sonny Ross |
| Ring announcer | Ati So'o |
| Ring announcer | Al Harrington (Uncle Elmer / Hans Schroeder match Debbie the Killer Tomato / Spice Williams match) |
| Referee | Sammy Sampson |

=== Preliminary matches ===
The first match on the card was a standard singles match between "Jumping" Joe Solo and Robert Toronto. Toronto was a last minute replacement for Mighty Milo. It lasted 2 minutes and 36 seconds. Toronto won the match when he pinned Solo with a vertical suplex. The next bout saw The Kinipopos (Kinipopo #1 and Kinipopo #2) versus the team of Keith and Smith Hart (Note: Most sources identify Keith's tag team partner as Smith Hart, however, there are claims that the second man was Ross Hart or Ben Bassarab.) in a tag team match. The referee lost control of the bout when all four men began fighting in the ring and called a no contest after 12 minutes.

The next match was between Richie Magnett and Super Samoan Sakalia. Magnett's originally scheduled opponent, The Magnificent Malo, was another wrestler who failed to appear for the event. The wrestler grabbed the house microphone from ring announcer Sonny Ross and told the crowd that "there's only one reason he didn't show up because he couldn't beat me in 5 minutes". The bout lasted seven minutes until Magnett managed to put Sakalia in a figure-four leglock. Sakalia's ex-tag team partner, Superfly Tui, interfered before the Samoan wrestler could submit to the hold giving Magnett the victory via disqualification. Tui continued attacking Magnett until Jeff Magruder came to the rescue. Magruder, a world benchpress champion, was to have taken part in a six-man tag team match with Bruiser Brody and Tommy Rich against Kevin Sullivan, Mark Lewin and Prince Kamalamala. This was one of several matches that were scrapped when Sullivan and Rich were unable to appear at the event. A backstage interview conducted by Joe Pedicino teased a match between Tui and Magruder at some point in the future.

Up next was a match between Uncle Elmer and Hans Schroeder. The two men battled for over three minutes and included Elmer winning a test of strength before tossing his opponent over the top rope. Unable to climb back into the ring, Schroeder was counted out by the referee. The first championship defense of A Hot Summer Night II was between Spice Williams and Debbie the Killer Tomato for the "Hollywood Stunt Girls Championship". Debbie won the match after putting a submission hold on Williams. The next contest was a midget wrestling match which saw Chilly Bo Dilly defeat Little Kevin.

The next two bouts featured representatives from New Japan Pro-Wrestling, Keiji Muto and Seiji Sakaguchi, who each won singles matches against their American opponents Jerry Grey and Johnny Mantell respectively. This was followed by a Judo Jacket match between Bad News Allen and Alexis Smirnoff. In the build-up to this match, the Soviet wrestler had been claiming he could beat any American wrestler in this event. Allen, an ex-judoka and Olympic medalist, had decided to take Smirnoff up on his challenge. Smirnoff got the upper hand by attacking Allen before the start of the match. But later on when Allen was whipped into the turnbuckle, he surprised Smirnoff with a clothesline and scored a quick pinfall victory.

The tenth match of the night was between The Maxx Brothers (Madd Maxx and Super Maxx) defending the NWA Polynesian Pacific Tag Team Championship against The Samoan Connection (Farmer Boy Ipo and Leroy Brown). The match ended when Madd Maxx was pinned by Farmer Boy Ipo after the Samoans performed a double splash. The next encounter was between Steve Rickard, who was defending the NWA British Commonwealth Championship, against Jerry Lawler. Lawler was accompanied to the ring by then wife Paula Lawler as his valet for the evening. The 56-year-old Rickard was semi-retired at this point in his career. The title bout ended after nearly 10 minutes when Lawler dropped Rickard onto the ring ropes with an atomic drop. As the match was contested under New Zealand rules, this move was considered illegal and Lawler was disqualified as a result.

The following match on the card was a $22,000 Bodyslam Challenge between Bruiser Brody and Grizzly Smith. According to the stipulations, Brody would receive $22,000 from the gate if he was able to bodyslam the 510 lbs. wrestler. Before the match could begin, however, The Sheik made a surprise appearance at ringside. The "heel" wrestler, accompanied by "Maniac" Mark Lewin and Prince Kamalamala, demanded a chance to compete for the cash prize. Despite attempts by ring announcer Sonny Ross to restore order, The Sheik led an attack on both wrestlers and the bout was declared a no contest. The Sheik and his allies were run off when Lars Anderson entered the ring with a steel chair. A shoving match broke out between Brody and Smith and it looked like the two might come to blows. Urged on by Anderson, the two reluctantly shook hands and agreed to put aside their differences so they could face the trio in a six-man tag team match later that night. Another wild brawl occurred a few moments later after The Sheik chased a wrestling fan into the stands.

In the featured tag team match of the night, Kengo Kimura and Tatsumi Fujinami defeated Kendo Nagasaki and Mr. Pogo. Kimura and Fujinami were billed as the IWGP Tag Team Champions for the event, however, they had actually lost the titles to Akira Maeda and Osamu Kido four days earlier. Near the end of the match, Mr. Pogo held Kimura while Nagasaki attempted to strike with a savate kick. Kimura moved out of the way at the last moment causing Nagasaki to knock his partner out as a result. Fujinami then dropkicked Nagasaki out of the ring while Kimura pinned Mr. Pogo after performing a flying bodypress.

Antonio Inoki, the then IWGP Heavyweight Champion, faced Hacksaw Higgins in the next match. The bout ended quickly when Inoki was attacked by "Dr. Death" Steve Williams, who was not scheduled to be on the card, and issued a challenge to the Japanese champion. Inoki angrily climbed back into the ring with a steel chair and called for Williams to get inside with him. Williams instead tossed a chair at Inoki and casually walked away. Inoki was awarded the match by disqualification and escorted to the back by a second NJPW wrestler.

=== Main events ===
The history of these guys is seeing who they can put out of the ring, with career-ending injuries. Next time, Sheik, you bring the fire. You may burn me, but you'll pay for it.

— Bruiser Brody in a post-match interview

A Hot Summer Night II featured two main event matches. The first was for the NWA Polynesian Pacific Heavyweight Championship between defending champion Superfly Tui and Lars Anderson in a Steel Cage match. The two men were locked inside by Joe Pedicino who held the keys for safekeeping while a guest commentator. In a move inspired by Jimmy Snuka's infamous splash at Madison Square Garden four years earlier, Superfly Tui climbed to the top of the 16 foot chain-link cage attempting to finish off a seemingly helpless Lars Anderson. Anderson moved out of the way at the last moment and pinned Tui to regain the heavyweight title for a record fifth time. After the cage doors were unlocked, one of the Kinipopos entered the ring and helped Tui attack Anderson until officials could break it up. Anderson sustained a large gash on his face in the 2-on-1 attack which was present in his post-match interview.

In the second main event, Bruiser Brody and Grizzly Smith were joined by Keith Hart to take on the team of The Sheik, Mark Lewin and Prince Kamalamala in a six-man tag team barbed wire match. The match ended after five minutes when Hart was burned by The Sheik using a fireball. The bout was apparently not taped for television but was later reported on by the Honolulu Star-Bulletin:

When the flame went up Hart fell back, and his face was immediately covered with a towel by teammate Bruiser Brodie, as The Sheik fled from the ring and climbed a 50-foot TV tower where he lit more flames. Security personnel called for a nurse. But when she went to the locker room to administer first aid to Hart, she was kept out of the area by a guard who said, "the wrestling doctor is taking care of him." Photographers and reporters were also barred from Hart's locker room. Who "the wrestling doctor" was, wasn't quite clear.

— Dave Reardon, "Summer Night" Was Wet, Wild (August 1986)

== Aftermath ==
In spite of the cancelled matches, the promoters had retained several major stars for the show Antonio Inoki, Bruiser Brody, The Sheik, and the then up-and-coming Keiji Mutoh. A slowly dwindling wrestling audience meant that only a small number of hardcore fans were willing to sit through a heavy rainstorm at the outdoor arena for five hours. The event grossed $28,000 in ticket sales which barely covered renting out the venue. Lia Maivia was forced to scale back her operations which included moving PPW's regular shows from the Blaisdell Center to the Ilikai Hotel and ultimately abandoning her expansion plans. The failure of A Hot Summer Night II was the first, and arguably biggest, in a series of financial missteps that resulted in the close of NWA Polynesian Pro Wrestling less than two years later.

Lars Anderson's championship reign lasted only 11 days. He lost the NWA Polynesian Pacific Heavyweight Championship back to Superfly Tui at the "End of Summer Series" on August 20, 1986. Tui would go on to win the belt two more times before the promotion closed in mid-1988. The Maxx Brothers and The Samoan Connection continued feuding over the NWA Polynesian Pacific Tag Team Championship, with the latter team eventually coming out on the winning end. The Samoans remained champions until they lost the belts to the team of Mighty Milo and Mighty Tao the following summer. Like the heavyweight title, the tag team championship was also retired when the promotion folded.

== Reception ==
Attendance for the event was initially announced at 10,000, however, the actual number was closer to 1,900. It was the lowest attended supercard of the year and among the worst drawing NWA shows of the 1980s wrestling boom. The event was seen by local audiences on Honolulu's ABC affiliate KITV (Channel 4) and later throughout the United States via its syndicated television program Polynesian Pacific Pro Wrestling on SCORE. In addition, Superstars of Wrestling was to air a live satellite feed on WATL, its home station, at 2:00 AM. A technical glitch ended the broadcast and the Superstars showed highlights from the event the following week. While A Hot Summer Night II was covered by the Wrestling Observer Newsletter, the event did not attract wide attention among pro wrestling publications of the era.

A number of the TV episodes for A Hot Summer Night II were released on VHS and DVD in the early-2000s, however, the full show is not commercially available. In his review of the initial preliminary bouts, which aired on Polynesian Pacific Pro Wrestling, Thomas Hall of KB's Wrestling Reviews called the supercard "one of weakest shows I've seen in a long time" and expressed surprise that it was presented as a major event. The reviewer was particularly critical of the "low rent" storyline and what he felt were generally subpar performances. He also pointed out obvious problems with the production values such as the announcers incorrectly referring to Keith Hart's tag team partner as "Owen", ill-timed commercial breaks, and the bad optics of a nearly-empty stadium.

== Results ==
| No. | Results | Stipulations | Times |
|---|---|---|---|
| 1 | Robert Toronto defeated Joe Solo | Singles match | 2:36 |
| 2 | The Kinipopos (Kinipopo #1 and Kinipopo #2) vs. The Hart Brothers (Keith Hart and Smith Hart) ended in a no contest | Tag team match | 12:13 |
| 3 | Richie Magnett defeated Super Samoan Sakalia by disqualification | Singles match | 6:59 |
| 4 | Uncle Elmer defeated Hans Schroeder by countout | Singles match | 3:47 |
| 5 | Debbie the Killer Tomato defeated Spice Williams by submission | Singles match for the Hollywood Stunt Girls Championship | 6:58 |
| 6 | Chilly Bo Dilly defeated Little Kevin | Midget wrestling match | 6:43 |
| 7 | Keiji Muto defeated Jerry Grey | Singles match | 5:21 |
| 8 | Seiji Sakaguchi defeated Johnny Mantell | Singles match | — |
| 9 | Bad News Allen defeated Alexis Smirnoff | Judo Jacket match | 4:21 |
| 10 | The Samoan Connection (Farmer Boy Ipo and Leroy Brown) defeated The Maxx Brothers (Madd Maxx and Super Maxx) (c) | Tag team match for the NWA Polynesian Pacific Tag Team Championship | 7:44 |
| 11 | Steve Rickard (c) defeated Jerry Lawler (with Paula Lawler) by disqualification | Singles match for the NWA British Commonwealth Championship | 9:57 |
| 12 | Bruiser Brody vs. Grizzly Smith ended in a no contest | $22,000 Bodyslam Challenge | — |
| 13 | Kengo Kimura and Tatsumi Fujinami defeated Kendo Nagasaki and Mr. Pogo | Tag team match | 8:51 |
| 14 | Antonio Inoki defeated Hacksaw Higgins by disqualification | Singles match | 2:59 |
| 15 | Lars Anderson defeated Superfly Tui (c) | Steel Cage match for the NWA Polynesian Pacific Heavyweight Championship | 4:57 |
| 16 | Bruiser Brody, Grizzly Smith and Keith Hart vs. The Sheik, Mark Lewin and Prince Kamalamala ended in a no contest | Six-man tag team barbed wire match | — |
(c) / – the champion(s) heading into the match
