= A Hot Summer Night =

Wrestling event in Hawaii, 1985

- Promotion(s): National Wrestling Alliance; NWA Polynesian Pro Wrestling
- Date: August 3, 1985
- City: Honolulu, Hawaii
- Venue: Aloha Stadium
- Attendance: 12,553-19,955

A Hot Summer Night chronology
← Previous; First event	Next → A Hot Summer Night II

A Hot Summer Night: The '85 World Invitational Wrestling Spectacular (also known as Polynesian Hot Summer Night) was a professional wrestling supercard produced by NWA Polynesian Pro Wrestling (NWA-PPW), which took place on August 3, 1985, at the Aloha Stadium in Honolulu, Hawaii. An interpromotional show, it featured wrestlers from the American Wrestling Association, Jim Crockett Promotions and New Japan Pro-Wrestling.

Sixteen professional wrestling matches were set on the event's supercard. The main attraction on the event card was Ric Flair defending the NWA World Heavyweight Championship against Siva Afi, which ended in a double disqualification. In the other main event, Antonio Inoki wrestled Bruiser Brody in a standard wrestling match. The undercard included Lars Anderson winning the NWA Polynesian Pacific Heavyweight Championship from Bad News Allen, defending NWA Polynesian Pacific Tag Team Champions The Soul Patrol (Rocky Johnson and his brother Ricky Johnson) beating The Dirty White Boys (Len Denton and Tony Anthony), and The Family (André the Giant, Angelo Mosca and Steve Collins) defeating Sullivan's Army (King Kong Bundy, Mark Lewin and Kevin Sullivan) in a six-man tag team match. According to a pre-match stipulation, anyone who managed to bodyslam Bundy would win $20,000.

The event had an attendance of between 12,553 and 19,955 people. While working for Jim Crockett Promotions, Jim Cornette was told that the show drew 15,000. It was the first show in Hawaii to gross over $100,000 and remained the state's highest-attended pro wrestling event during the 1980s wrestling boom. The record lasted for over 5 years until the WWF held a live event at the same venue in 1991. A second installment, A Hot Summers Night II, was held the following year but had a much smaller turnout due to a severe rainstorm. The failure of this second supercard, and a disastrous 1987 tour of California, is blamed for the promotion's close only three years later.

Several matches from A Hot Summer Night were broadcast on the promotion's syndicated television program Polynesian Pacific Pro Wrestling and on TV Asahi for NJPW's World Pro Wrestling later that month. A number of these episodes were released on VHS and DVD in the early-2000s, however, the full show is not commercially available. In May 2022, the event was depicted on the "Backyard Brawl-B-Q" episode of Young Rock.

== Results ==
No.	Results	Stipulations	Times
1	The Cobra (c) defeated Super Fly Tui Selinga	Singles match for the WWF Junior Heavyweight Championship	7:13
2	Seiji Sakaguchi defeated Matt Borne	Singles match	3:16
3	Kengo Kimura and Tatsumi Fujinami defeated Gary Fulton and Gene Lewis	Tag team match	—
4	Jimmy Snuka defeated Larry Sharpe	Singles match	—
5	Manny Fernandez defeated Black Bart (c) by disqualification	Singles match for the NWA National Heavyweight Championship	—
6	Mighty Milo vs. Steve Regal (c) ended in a time limit draw	Singles match for the AWA Light Heavyweight Championship	—
7	Debbie Combs defeated The Fallen Angel by disqualification	Women's Street Fight match	—
8	The Samoan Connection (Farmer Boy Ipo and Leroy Brown) defeated The Deaton Brothers (Joel Deaton and Vernon Deaton)	Tag team match	—
9	Little Kevin defeated Pancho Boy	Midget wrestling match	—
10	Richie Magnett defeated Gypsy Joe	Singles match	—
11	Dusty Rhodes and Magnum T. A. defeated The Russians (Nikita Koloff and Krusher Khrushchev)	Tag team match	—
12	André the Giant, Angelo Mosca and Steve Collins defeated King Kong Bundy, Mark Lewin and Kevin Sullivan	Six-man tag team match	—
13	Lars Anderson defeated Bad News Allen (c)	Singles match for the NWA Polynesian Pacific Heavyweight Championship	—
14	The Soul Patrol (Rocky Johnson and Ricky Johnson) (c) defeated The Dirty White Boys (Len Denton and Tony Anthony)	Tag team match for the NWA Polynesian Pacific Tag Team Championship	—
15	Antonio Inoki vs. Bruiser Brody ended in a double countout	Singles match	8:40
16	Ric Flair (c) vs. Siva Afi ended in a double disqualification	Singles match for the NWA World Heavyweight Championship	—
(c) / – the champion(s) heading into the match
