= Eli the Eliminator =

American retired professional wrestler

Personal information
- Born: John Richmond; 1961 (age 64–65) Chicago, Illinois, US

Professional wrestling career
- Ring name(s): Eli the Eliminator; Mad Maxx
- Billed height: 6 ft 2 in (1.88 m)
- Billed weight: 260 lb (120 kg)
- Debut: 1978
- Retired: 1998

John Richmond (born 1961) is an American retired professional wrestler, better known by his ring name, Eli the Eliminator.

Richmond competed in North American regional promotions during the 1980s in Bill Watts' Universal Wrestling Federation and World Class Championship Wrestling, most notably as a member of Skandor Akbar's stable Devastation, Inc.. He also had a brief stint in the American Wrestling Association as one half of the Maxx Brothers (also billed as the World or Wild Warriors) with Super Maxx.

== Professional wrestling career ==
=== Early career ===
Making his debut in 1978, he first began wrestling in the Indianapolis-based World Wrestling Association as Mad Maxx defeating Disco Dog and Rocky Guerrero in singles matches before teaming with Super Maxx as the Wild Warriors defeating Jeff Van Kamp and Calypso Jim on July 7 and later Jeff Van Kamp and Dick the Bruiser for the WWA Tag Team Championship in September 1984. Although suffering a loss to Dick the Bruiser and Moose Cholak by disqualification on November 10, Richmond and Super Maxx successfully defended the titles for several months including close matches against Bobby Colt and Bobo Brazil; although the tag team title history during this time is largely unrecorded, at least one source claims the Maxx Brothers lost the titles to Bobby Colt and Bobo Brazil on December 29.

They later feuded with The Untouchables (Buster and Ice) in Windy City Pro Wrestling facing them at the Battle of the Belts supercards, including a steel cage match in which Jim "The Anvil" Neidhart would be in the corner of The Untouchables.

After losing the titles to Dick the Bruiser & Bobby Colt in March 1985, he and Super Maxx jumped to the American Wrestling Association the following year facing The Midnight Rockers and later feuded with The Samoan Connection (Farmer Boy Ipo and Leroy Brown (wrestler)) over the Polynesian Pacific Tag Team titles during the summer which was later aired by Atlanta promoter Joe Pedicino during the Hot Summer Night in Aloha Stadium television special. During that year, they would later tour Japan facing Tatsumi Fujinami and Kengo Kimura.

=== Mid-South and World Class Championship Wrestling ===
In early 1987, Richmond began wrestling for the Universal Wrestling Federation teaming with "Wild" Bill Irwin to defeat The Fantastics at the Sam Houston Coliseum on January 23 and in a rematch the following night. He and Irwin would later participate in the UWF Tag Team Title Tournament being eliminated by Steve Williams and Ted DiBiase in the opening rounds on February 7, 1987.

Along with Irwin, Richmond soon aligned himself with manager Skandar Akbar's Devastation Inc. and eventually followed Akbar to Fritz von Erich's World Class Championship Wrestling later that year. Feuding with Spike Huber, he and Abdullah the Butcher lost to Huber and Red River Jack at the 4th annual Parade of Champions on May 3, 1987. During his time in the promotion, he would regularly appear on WCCW's weekly television program later facing Jeff Gaylord and Chavo Guerrero. In late 1987, he would return to Japan losing to Super Strong Machine at the Ryōgoku Kokugikan in Tokyo, Japan on October 25, 1987. From there he appeared in Ken Mantel's Wild West Wrestling out of Fort Worth and was managed by Sunshine. He feuded with Fabulous Lance (Von Erich), Missing Link, and Savannah Jack.

=== Later career ===
After a brief stint in the Global Wrestling Federation feuding with former tag team partner Bill Irwin (wrestler) during 1990, he later teamed with Mike Samples although the two remained in the Memphis-area only a short time and later teamed with John Tatum and Jack Victory against Savannah Jack, Sullivan Gundy and The Missing Link.

Teaming with Keith Eric, he lost to Brian Christopher and Tony Williams and later with Brian Lee losing to Curtis Thompson and Chris Walker in February 1991 before leaving the promotion.

== Championships and accomplishments ==
- NWA Polynesian Pacific Wrestling
  - NWA Polynesian Pacific Tag Team Championship (2 times) – with Super Maxx
- World Wrestling Association
  - WWA World Tag Team Championship (1 time) – with Super Maxx
