= Fighting of World Japan Pro Wrestling =

Professional wrestling promotion

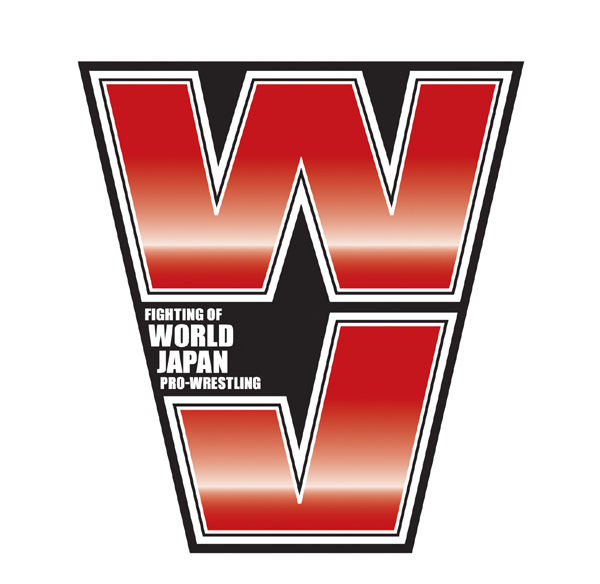
- Acronym: WJ
- Founded: 2002
- Defunct: Mid-2004
- Style: Puroresu
- Founder(s): Riki Choshu; Katsuji Nagashima
- Owner(s): Riki Choshu; Katsuji Nagashima
- Split from: New Japan Pro-Wrestling
- Successor: Riki Pro

Fighting of World Japan Pro Wrestling, also known as Fighting World of Japan Pro Wrestling and frequently shortened to World Japan or WJ, was a professional wrestling promotion formed in Japan in 2002 by former New Japan Pro-Wrestling employees Riki Choshu and Katsuji Nagashima, who also served as chairmen along with Tomohiro Ishii.

== History ==
=== Formation ===
In January 2002, New Japan Pro-Wrestling (NJPW) ace Keiji Mutoh left the promotion, jumping to rival All Japan Pro Wrestling (AJPW) along with Satoshi Kojima and Kendo Kashin. Riki Choshu, NJPW's head booker at the time, was blamed for their departure and removed from his position by the president Antonio Inoki in February. Furious with Inoki's decision to do this, Choshu left the promotion altogether in May 2002 and blasted both Inoki and chairman Tatsumi Fujinami in interviews. At the same time Mutoh had left NJPW, Choshu's longtime friend Katsuji Nagashima, who worked as a booker and head of NJPW's advertising department, had also left the company and formed his agency, Nagashima Promotions, working with Pro Wrestling ZERO-ONE as a third party liaison to freelance wrestlers as well as a booking agency. Choshu proposed a partnership with Nagashima, and Nagashima Promotions was soon renamed "The Riki Nagashima Project". Shortly after this, the two began seeking a sponsor to fund their promotion. They were backed by Seiji Fukuda, a well-known entrepreneur from Hokkaido. Fukuda joined their project as president and representative director, Nagashima became managing director, and Choshu became the director. In November, Choshu officially announced the formation of Fighting of World Japan Pro Wrestling in a press conference.

With WJ established, Choshu began seeking talent to sign to the newborn promotion. Kensuke Sasaki, a trainee of Choshu and the former ace of NJPW, had grown disillusioned with New Japan's focus on MMA fighters over pro wrestlers and announced his departure from NJPW in October 2002 once his contract expired in January. Shiro Koshinaka, Kenzo Suzuki and referee Masao "Tiger" Hattori also announced they would not be renewing their contracts with New Japan in January, and the three committed to join WJ in December. Yoshiaki Yatsu (who had been Choshu's ally in New Japan, Japan Pro Wrestling Alliance, and All Japan Pro Wrestling in the 1980s), was also brought in as the head of the sales division, along with some of the talent from his regional SPWF promotion. Choshu filled his roster with young independent stars such as Tomohiro Ishii and Takashi Uwano, freelancers such as Genichiro Tenryu, Takao Omori and Atsushi Onita, gaijin including Vader, The Road Warriors, "Dr. Death" Steve Williams and Big Vito, and young American wrestlers such as Lex Lovett, Steve Madison, The Maximos, and The Shane Twins. Choshu himself also announced he would wrestle for the promotion, and booked himself into the main event of the first show against longtime rival Tenryu.

=== Debut show and initial setbacks ===
With the roster established, WJ began planning its debut show for March 2003. It had originally been planned to debut in November 2002, however, Choshu had to wait until some of his wrestlers' contracts with NJPW had expired, and as a result, WJ's debut show, MAGMA01, was postponed many times. It eventually took place on March 1, 2003 in Yokohama Arena, running the same day that Pro Wrestling NOAH and K-1 were also promoting major events in Nippon Budokan and Ariake Coliseum, respectively. This was the only day a major arena could be booked in March, and Nagashima and Choshu could not postpone the debut any longer as they had already done so several times and lost bookings in other arenas as a result. Despite the competition, MAGMA01 drew a respectable 13,000 fans to Yokohama, and the promotion soon set out on its first tour the same month. They suffered their first setback on that very tour when Choshu himself was injured during the third match of his planned six-match series with Genichiro Tenryu and forced to pull out of all events for the foreseeable future. In addition, Atsushi Onita withdrew from all future events due to commitments to his political career. WJ began pushing Kensuke Sasaki as their top star but struggled to gain a fanbase, and attendance and interest soon began to dwindle. WJ struggled to turn a profit with any shows they ran, and Choshu's excessive spending soon became a problem; this had been a worry of investors for months, as Choshu had spent over ¥200 million ($1.8 million USD) before they had even run a show on building a dojo, a tour bus, a new car for himself, and an expensive year-end party attended by many celebrities and high profile figures.

A tournament took place in July to crown the first WMG (World Magma the Greatest) Heavyweight Champion, won by Sasaki, but did not receive the belt until weeks later due to it remaining incomplete by the supplier.

=== Decline ===
On July 28, 2003, MMA fighter turned pro wrestler Giant Ochiai was training under Kenzo Suzuki in the WJ dojo when he lost consciousness and eventually fell into a coma, dying of an acute subdural hematoma on August 8, 2003. Choshu, Nagashima, and Suzuki were all present in the dojo when he lost consciousness, but none of them were charged to his death. However, WJ faced severe media scrutiny for refusing to accept responsibility for the incident.

In the fallout of Ochiai's death, Kenzo Suzuki and Yoshiaki Yatsu both left the promotion, with Yatsu, in particular, blasting Choshu in interviews with the media, famously telling Nikkan Sports "Riki Choshu has no idea how independent wrestling works". WJ's numerous financial issues also became greater and greater public knowledge around this time; Choshu's spending had not slowed down, and he continued to make extravagant purchases with investors money, including sending ¥1 million a month to both of his daughters who were studying in the United Kingdom at the time. Numerous wrestlers began to claim they were owed money by Choshu, with Kensuke Sasaki putting up ¥5 million of his own money and canceling his life insurance to help continue to promote events. WJ's unpaid salaries were later parodied in the promotion, with Shiro Koshinaka forming the "Labour Union" stable and feuding with Choshu in kayfabe over his numerous debts to them.

In a bid to recoup money and replicate the success of Pride FC and K-1, Choshu announced "X1" in September, a sister MMA promotion of WJ which drew some attention after they announced Katsuhiko Nakajima, then 15 years old, would debut as the youngest MMA fighter ever on the card. Despite the attention, the show was heavily panned by fans who criticized the inexperienced fighters and low level of competition. In addition to this, the cage itself began to collapse during the show and had to be held up by ringside assistants during the last fights. Choshu himself walked out of the event and refused to talk to the media before the end of the show, to the anger of Sasaki and Nagashima.

=== Closure ===
After the colossal failure of X1, many WJ events would be promoted and then suddenly canceled just days before; it was later revealed that Nagashima had either lied about booking the venues or not paid the money owed to hire them and when he was unable to secure them, simply canceled the events. The most infamous of these happened on October 22, 2003, when WJ had announced they were running Korakuen Hall; however, it was quickly pointed out that a boxing show was scheduled to take place in Korakuen on that day and Nagashima had once again lied about the booking.

By the end of 2003, Shiro Koshinaka and Takao Omori had both left for other organizations, and WJ's ace Kensuke Sasaki returned to NJPW in December. The failure of WJ severely damaged the formerly close relationship between Sasaki and Choshu; Sasaki lost over ¥5 million and canceled his life insurance to fund WJ events, leading to him and his wife Akira Hokuto facing severe money issues in late 2003 and Sasaki having to work up to two independent shows a day just to support his family.

World Japan was ultimately viewed by Japanese fans as just another independent promotion in the saturated world of pro wrestling, so it was not able to make a dent in the major promotions' fanbases. It officially closed in mid-2004 and was eventually succeeded by Riki Pro, a small-time independent promotion that mainly ran in Korakuen Hall.

== Championships ==
=== World Magma the Greatest (WMG) Heavyweight Championship ===
Wrestler:	Reigns:	Date:	Place:	Notes:
Kensuke Sasaki	1	July 20, 2003	Tokyo, Japan	Defeated Kenzo Suzuki in a tournament final to win the title; vacated title in December 2003 when he left the promotion

=== World Magma the Greatest (WMG) Tag Team Championship ===
Wrestlers:	Reigns:	Date:	Place:	Notes:
Riki Choshu & Genichiro Tenryu	1	August 21, 2003	Osaka, Japan	Defeated Shiro Koshinaka & Jinsei Shinzaki in a tournament final to win the title; vacated title in 2004 due to lack of defenses
Kintaro Kanemura & Badboy Hido	1	August 19, 2004	Osaka, Japan	Defeated Tomohiro Ishii & Kendo Kashin to win the vacant title; title vacated when the team split up.
Tetsuhiro Kuroda & Badboy Hido (2)	1	April 16, 2005	Tokyo, Japan	Defeated Kanemura & Ishii to win vacant title

== See also ==
- Professional wrestling in Japan
- List of professional wrestling promotions in Japan
