= Ryuma Go =

Japanese professional wrestler

Personal information
- Born: Hiroshi Yagi; March 23, 1956 Tokyo, Japan
- Died: October 18, 2009 (aged 53)

Professional wrestling career
- Ring names: Ryuma Go; Hiroshi Yagi; Mister Go; The Super Ninja; Ninja Go; Mr. Zinn
- Billed height: 1.85 m (6 ft 1 in)
- Billed weight: 108 kg (238 lb)
- Trained by: IWE Dojo
- Debut: September 9, 1972

Hiroshi Yagi (八木 宏, Yagi Hiroshi; March 23, 1956 – October 18, 2009), best known by his ring name Ryuma Go (剛 竜馬, Gō Ryūma), was a Japanese professional wrestler. He is best known for his tenures in All Japan Pro Wrestling (AJPW), New Japan Pro Wrestling (NJPW), Wrestle Association-R (WAR) and the National Wrestling Alliance (NWA). He won the WWF Junior Heavyweight Championship defeating Tatsumi Fujinami in 1979. He is also the founder of Pioneer Senshi, considered the first independent promotion in Japan.

== Career ==
Ryuma Go began his wrestling training in 1971 at age 15. A year later, he made his professional wrestling debut on September 9, 1972, for International Wrestling Enterprise. Also in 1972 both New Japan Pro Wrestling and All Japan Pro Wrestling started where he would work for both companies for years. In 1974, Go made his debut in North America where he worked in Canada for Stampede Wrestling in Calgary and NWA All-Star Wrestling in Vancouver under his real name. In 1978, he made his debut in the United States working for NWA Hollywood where he won the NWA Americas tag team titles with Black Gordman.

On October 2, 1979, Go won the WWF Junior Heavyweight Championship defeating Tatsumi Fujinami in Osaka, two days later he dropped the title back to Fujinami in Tokyo for New Japan.

In 1979, he returned to both Calgary and Vancouver. Then in 1980, Go wrestled his last match for International Wrestling Enterprise as the company folded in 1981 where Go became a full time worked for New Japan. UWFi was formed in 1984 by Akira Maeda, Yoshiaki Fujiwara and other New Japan defectors where Go would team with Rusher Kimura. Later that same year, Go work in Mexico and work full time for All Japan.

Go would return to the States in 1986 working for American Wrestling Association (AWA) as the Super Ninja. In 1987, he worked for UWF Mid-South as feuding with Steve Cox. Later that year in the AWA, he changed his name to Mister Go teaming with Shunji Takano as the Super Ninja. In 1988, he left AWA and returned to Japan.

In 1989, Go started his Pioneer Senshi, the first independent Japanese promotion. In the 1990s he worked for Oriental Pro Wrestling, Pacific Northwest Wrestling, and Wrestle Association-R. Later in his career he worked for more independent Japanese promotions until his retirement in 2000.

In 2006, he returned to wrestle for DDT Pro Wrestling and other Japanese promotions. He wrestled his last match on September 3, 2009.

== Personal life ==
Yagi married his wife in 1987, and together they had one son and two daughters. Their relationship, however, was often strained, due to the fact that Yagi kept what money he earned from wrestling for himself, meaning his wife had to work full time to provide for their children. She filed for divorce in 2003, which was finalised in 2005.

=== 2003 arrest ===
Yagi was arrested on suspicion of theft at the west exit of JR Shinjuku Station on January 15, 2003, after reportedly snatching a wallet containing around ¥22,000 from a 69 year-old woman and attempting to flee. He was stopped and apprehended by a nearby office worker, and later taken into custody at Shinjuku Police Station. Yagi, who was working in an office at the time of his arrest, denied the crime and claimed he was returning the wallet to the woman after she had dropped it. He remained in detention for 188 days until he was released without prosecution on July 22, 2003.

=== Death ===
On October 7, 2009, Yagi was involved in a traffic accident while cycling, injuring his wrist. He was visited by his son at his apartment in Atsugi on October 13, who became worried after receiving no response at the door. On October 14, his eldest daughter visited the house and called him an ambulance, after which he was taken into hospital. Yagi's injury had become infected and he died of sepsis at 1:11 on October 18, 2009, at 53 years old. Yagi's wife was the chief mourner at his funeral, held on October 19 and attended by over thirty wrestlers, including Animal Hamaguchi, who spoke.

== Championships and accomplishments ==
- Championship Wrestling USA
  - Championship Wrestling USA International Tag Team Championship (2 times) - with Jesse Barr
- NWA Hollywood
  - NWA "Beat the Champ" Television Championship (1 time)
  - NWA Americas Tag Team Championship (2 times) - with Black Gordman and Mr. Toyo
- Pro Wrestling Illustrated
  - PWI ranked Ryuma Go # 242 of the 500 best singles wrestlers of the PWI 500 in 1993
  - PWI ranked Ryuma Go # 304 of the 500 best singles wrestlers of the PWI 500 in 1994
  - PWI ranked Ryuma Go # 290 of the 500 best singles wrestlers of the PWI 500 in 1995
- Ring Around The Northwest Newsletter
  - Tag Team of the Year (1993) with Jesse Barr
- World Wrestling Federation
  - WWF Junior Heavyweight Championship (1 time)
