= Hot Summer Night (disambiguation) =

"Hot Summer Night" is an alternative title for 1977 Meatloaf song "You Took the Words Right Out of My Mouth"

Hot Summer Night or variants may also refer to:

== Film and Theatre ==
- Hot Summer Night (play), 1958 play by Ted Willis, televised in Britain on 1 February 1959
- Hot Summer Night (film), 1957 MGM crime film
- One Hot Summer Night, 1998 television movie directed by James A. Contner
- Hot Summer Nights (film), a 2017 American drama film directed by Elijah Bynum, starring Timothée Chalamet, Alex Roe, and Maika Monroe

== Music ==
- "Hot Summer Night", song by Vicki Sue Robinson (1981)
- "Hot Summer Night (Oh La La La)", song by David Tavaré (2007)
- "Long Hot Summer Night", song by Jimi Hendrix from Electric Ladyland (1968)
- "Long Hot Summer Night", song by J.T. Taylor from Feel the Need (1991)
- "Two Hot Girls (On a Hot Summer Night)", song by Carly Simon from the album Coming Around Again (1987)
- A Hot Summer Night...with Donna, Donna Summer video (1983)
- "Hot Summer Nights", track by Miami Sound Machine on the Top Gun soundtrack (1986)
- "Hot Summer Nights", song by Night (1979)
- "Hot Summer Nights", song by The Script from Sunsets & Full Moons (2019)

== Other uses ==
- Hot Summer Night (wrestling match), 1985 event in Hawaii
