= Osamu Kido =

Japanese professional wrestler (1950–2023)

Personal information
- Born: February 2, 1950 Kawasaki, Kanagawa, Japan
- Died: December 11, 2023 (aged 73) Yokosuka, Japan

Professional wrestling career
- Ring name: Osamu Kido
- Billed height: 1.80 m (5 ft 11 in)
- Billed weight: 105 kg (231 lb)
- Billed from: Kawasaki, Kanagawa, Japan
- Trained by: Karl Gotch
- Debut: February 21, 1969
- Retired: 2010

Osamu Kido (木戸 修, Kido Osamu; February 2, 1950 – December 11, 2023) was a Japanese professional wrestler who wrestled for New Japan Pro-Wrestling (NJPW). He participated in the foundation of New Japan of 1972 and the foundation of Universal Wrestling Federation (UWF) in 1984. In 2005, after four years in retirement, Kido returned to the ring.

== Career ==
Osamu Kido made his debut for Japanese Wrestling Association on February 21, 1969, against Hirokatsu Shinkai (Motoyuki Kitazawa/Shoji Kai). When Antonio Inoki was expelled from JWA in 1971, Kido followed suit and helped Inoki form a new promotion called New Japan Pro-Wrestling in 1972. In 1975, Kido and Tatsumi Fujinami were sent abroad to Europe, to participate in an international tournament in Germany. Afterwards, he went to the United States to train in Florida with the legendary Karl Gotch, who called Kido "his son."

Kido returned to NJPW in February 1976. However, due to his simplistic wrestling style and lack of expression, he was relegated to opening and mid-card matches.

After eight years, Kido left NJPW to join UWF at Karl Gotch's recommendation. In the UWF, Kido gained popularity with his mat skills. In 1985, he won the Three Tour Tournament.

After the UWF promotion fell apart, Kido and most of the UWF roster returned to NJPW in December 1985, setting the stage for the original NJPW vs. UWF feud. The feud showcased Kido higher up in the matches. On August 5, 1986, Kido teamed with Akira Maeda to win the IWGP Tag Team Championship, defeating Tatsumi Fujinami and Kengo Kimura. They would hold on to the titles for over a month, before losing the titles back to Fujinami and Kimura on September 23, 1986. As Maeda and most of the UWF stars decided to restart the UWF as Newborn UWF in 1988, Kido decided to stay in NJPW, because "his father (Karl Gotch) wasn't there."

In 1992, New Japan entered another inter-promotional feud with WAR, and Kido proved to be NJPW's ace in the hole, as WAR lacked submission-based wrestlers. In 1993, Kido took part in the G1 Climax; he defeated WAR's Takashi Ishikawa in the first round, but lost to eventual winner Tatsumi Fujinami in the quarterfinals. Later that year, he teamed with Fujinami for the Super Grade Tag League; they tied for second place with thirteen points with the team of Masahiro Chono and Shinya Hashimoto. In 1994, he took part in the G1 Climax; he placed last in Block A with two points. Later that year, he teamed with Scott Norton to take part in the Super Grade Tag League; they tied for second place with ten points with the team of Tatsumi Fujinami and Yoshiaki Fujiwara.

In 1995, Kido teamed with Kazuo Yamazaki for the Super Grade Tag League; they lost to Masahiro Chono and Hiroyoshi Tenzan in the finals. Five years later, he took part in his last tournament in NJPW, the G1 Climax; he placed last on Block B with no points, tying with Hiro Saito. On November 2, 2001, Kido wrestled his retirement match, teaming with Riki Choshu, wrestling Tatsumi Fujinami and Kengo Kimura to a time-limit draw. Aside from a battle royal in May 2003, Kido would focus on training rookies at the NJPW Dojo, including Shinsuke Nakamura.

In 2005, Kido came out of retirement to wrestle for Big Mouth Loud. After BML dissolved in 2010, Kido retired from wrestling.

== Death ==
Kido died from cancer in Yokosuka, on December 11, 2023, at the age of 73.

== Championships and accomplishments ==
- New Japan Pro-Wrestling
  - IWGP Tag Team Championship (1 time) – with Akira Maeda
- Tokyo Sports
  - Service Award (2001)
- Universal Wrestling Federation
  - Three Tour Tournament (1985)
