= WWF International Heavyweight Championship =

Wrestling competition

- New Japan Pro Wrestling (NJPW)'s version of the WWF International Heavyweight Championship belt

Details
- Promotion: Capitol Wrestling Corporation (CWC); World Wrestling Federation (WWF); New Japan Pro-Wrestling (NJPW); Universal Wrestling Federation (UWF)
- Date established: 1959
- Date retired: 1985

Other names
- NWA International Heavyweight Championship (Northeast version) (1959–1963); WWWF International Heavyweight Championship (1963)
Statistics
- First champion: Antonino Rocca
- Final champion: Tatsumi Fujinami
- Most reigns: Tatsumi Fujinami (3 reigns)
- Oldest champion: Tony Parisi (41 years, 145 days)
- Youngest champion: Akira Maeda (25 years, 62 days)
- Heaviest champion: Riki Choshu (265lb (120kg))
- Lightest champion: Antonino Rocca (224lb (102kg))

The WWF International Heavyweight Championship is a former championship recognized by the Capitol Wrestling Corporation, the World Wrestling Federation, New Japan Pro-Wrestling, and the Universal Wrestling Federation.

== History ==
The title existed from 1959 through 1963 and again from 1982 through 1985.

== Reigns ==
Key
No.	Overall reign number
Reign	Reign number for the specific champion
Days	Number of days held

No.	Champion	Championship change			Reign statistics		Notes	Ref.
No.	Champion	Date	Event	Location	Reign	Days	Notes	Ref.
National Wrestling Alliance (NWA)
1	Antonino Rocca	July 2, 1959	House show	New York, NY	1	1,554	Defeated Buddy Rogers to become the inaugural champion.	
World Wide Wrestling Federation (WWWF)
—	Vacated	October 3, 1963	—	—	—	—	Antonino Rocca vacated the championship and it later became inactive.	
Championship history is unrecorded from 1963 to 1982.
National Wrestling Alliance: World Wrestling Federation (WWF)
2	Tony Parisi	June 15, 1982	House show	Buffalo, NY	1	64	It is uncertain who Parisi defeated to win the championship.	
3	Gino Brito	August 18, 1982	House show	Buffalo, NY	1	12		
4	Tatsumi Fujinami	August 30, 1982	WWF on MSG Network	New York, NY	1	216		
5	Riki Choshu	April 3, 1983	Big Fight Series II 1983	Tokyo, Japan	1	123		
6	Tatsumi Fujinami	August 4, 1983	Summer Fight Series 1983	Tokyo, Japan	2	234	Fujinami won the match by count-out but refused to accept the championship. A rematch between Fujinami and Choshu to determine a new champion was scheduled in Calgary, Alberta on August 12, 1983 but Choshu could not get into Canada for the match, and Fujinami was recognized as undisputed champion.	
Universal Wrestling Federation (UWF Japan)
†	Akira Maeda	March 25, 1984	All American Wrestling	New York, NY	1	90	Maeda defeated Pierre Lefebvre at Madison Square Garden to be recognized by the WWF but the victory was ignored by NJPW.	
—	Vacated	June 23, 1984	House show	—	—	—	Akira Maeda departed from the WWF during this reign and defended the title as the "UWF Heavyweight Championship" in the Universal Wrestling Federation.	
World Wrestling Federation (WWF)
†	Tatsumi Fujinami	July 5, 1984	—	—	2^{(3)}	379	Fujinami regained recognition from the WWF though NJPW recognized his second reign as uninterrupted.	
—	Vacated	July 19, 1985	House show	Sapporo, Japan	—	—	When Tatsumi Fujinami gave up the title after wrestle against Super Strong Machine due to a double disqualification.	
Championship history is unrecorded from August 1985 to September 1985.
—	Deactivated	October 31, 1985	House show	—	—	—	The championship was abandoned when the WWF ended its working relationship with NJPW.	

== See also ==
- WCW International World Heavyweight Championship
- TNA International Championship
