= Kengo Kimura =

Japanese professional wrestler (born 1953)

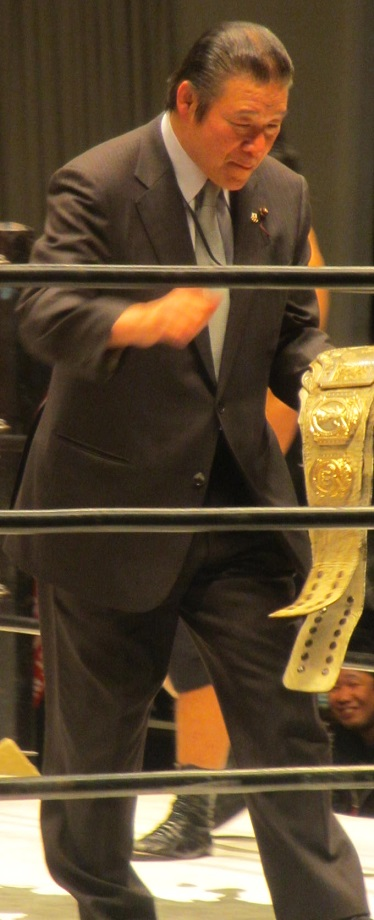
- Kimura in 2015

Personal information
- Born: Seiei Kumura; September 4, 1953 (age 72) Niihama, Ehime, Japan

Professional wrestling career
- Ring name(s): Takashi Kimura; Pak Choo; Kengo Kimura; Kendo Kimura
- Billed height: 1.86 m (6 ft 1 in)
- Billed weight: 107 kg (236 lb)
- Trained by: Antonio Inoki; NJPW Dojo; Seiji Sakaguchi
- Debut: August 2, 1972
- Retired: April 18, 2003

Seiei Kimura (木村 聖裔, Kimura Seiei; born September 4, 1953) is a Japanese retired professional wrestler, best known under the ring name Kengo Kimura (木村 健悟, Kimura Kengo) and for his many years working for New Japan Pro-Wrestling (NJPW) in Japan.

== Professional wrestling career ==
=== Japan Wrestling Association (1972–1973) ===
Kimura made his professional wrestling debut on August 2, 1972 on a Japan Pro Wrestling (JPW) card where he faced Akio Sato. In 1973, JWA folded.

=== New Japan Pro-Wrestling (1973–1977) ===
After JWA folded, Kimura joined New Japan Pro-Wrestling (NJPW) in 1973 as a junior heavyweight. He mainly worked on the undercard during this tenure, until he was sent to North America on a learning excursion.

=== Empresa Mexicana de Lucha Libre, Universal Wrestling Association and World Wrestling Council (1977–1980) ===
In the late 1970s Kengo Kimura travelled to North America for an excursion mainly working in Mexico for Empresa Mexicana de Lucha Libre (EMLL) and Universal Wrestling Association (UWA) and in Puerto Rico for the World Wrestling Council (WWC). In WWC Kimura defeated Carlos Colón to win the WWC Puerto Rico Heavyweight Championship. He would also hold the WWC Caribbean Tag Team Championship with Kengo Arakawa. He also held the WWC World Tag Team Championship along with Hiro Sasaki. On December 8, 1978 Kimura, while wrestling as "Pak Choo" won the NWA World Light Heavyweight Championship from El Faraón. He held the title until April 30, 1979 when Alfonso Dantés defeated him for the title.

=== Return to NJPW (1980–2003) ===
In 1980 Kimura returned to New Japan Pro-Wrestling. He quickly won the NWA International Junior Heavyweight Championship by defeating Bret Hart in a match for the vacant title. Kimura held the title until October 3, 1980 when he lost the belt to Chavo Guerrero.

In the mid-1980s Kimura began teaming with Tatsumi Fujinami on a regular basis. The team won the revived WWF International Tag Team Championship in 1985 when they defeated Dick Murdoch and Adrian Adonis. The title was vacated a few months later when NJPW decided to create their own Tag Team title, the IWGP Tag Team Championship. Kimura and Fujinami won the tournament to crown the first ever IWGP Tag Team title defeating Antonio Inoki and Seiji Sakaguchi in the finals of the tournament, with Fujinami upsetting Inoki by pinning him with his trademark Dragon Suplex. On August 5, 1986 Kimura and Fujinami were defeated by Akira Maeda and Osamu Kido to win the title. The duo regained the title only 49 days later, but vacated the belts in February, 1987 when the team split up.

In December 1986, Kimura graduated to the heavyweight division. Fujinami focused on winning the IWGP Heavyweight Championship while Kimura teamed with various partners in unsuccessful attempts at winning the tag team titles back. On January 18, 1988 Kimura and Fujinami reunited to win the IWGP Tag Team titles from Kazuo Yamazaki and Yoshiaki Fujiwara. The team's third reign ended on June 10, 1988 at the hands of Riki Choshu and Masa Saito, with the two not winning the title again until approximately nine years later when they defeated Hiroyoshi Tenzan and Masahiro Chono on January 4, 1997. Later that year Kimura teamed up with Takashi Ishikawa to capture Big Japan Pro Wrestling's inaugural BJW Tag Team Championship.

In the 1990s, he was part of Shiro Koshinaka's Heisei Ishingun faction, alongside Kuniaki Kobayashi, Akitoshi Saito, Tatsutoshi Goto, Akira Nogami, and Michiyoshi Ohara.

In early 2003 Kengo Kimura announced that he would retire at the end of the "Kengo Kimura Inazuma Countdown Tour". Kimura's retirement match took place on March 23, 2003 where he wrestled Osamu Nishimura to a time limit draw. Since his official retirement Kimura has only made one or two "special appearances" in the wrestling ring.

== Championships and accomplishments ==
- Big Japan Pro Wrestling
  - BJW Tag Team Championship (1 time, inaugural) – with Takashi Ishikawa
- Empresa Mexicana de la Lucha Libre
  - NWA World Light Heavyweight Championship (1 time)
- New Japan Pro-Wrestling
  - IWGP Tag Team Championship (4 times, inaugural) – with Tatsumi Fujinami
  - NWA International Junior Heavyweight Championship (1 time)
  - WWF International Tag Team Championship (1 time, final) – with Tatsumi Fujinami
  - IWGP Tag Title League (1985) - with Tatsumi Fujinami
  - Japan Cup Tag League (1987) - with Tatsumi Fujinami
- NWA Hollywood Wrestling
  - NWA Americas Tag Team Championship (2 times) – with Mr. Ito (1 time) and Roddy Piper (1 time)
- Pro Wrestling Illustrated
  - Ranked No. 235 of the top 500 singles wrestlers of the "PWI Years" in 2003
  - Ranked No. 46 of the 100 best tag team of the "PWI Years" with Tatsumi Fujinami in 2003
- Tokyo Sports Grand Prix
  - Best Tag Team (1992)- with Shiro Koshinaka, Masashi Aoyagi, and Akitoshi Saito
  - Outstanding Performance Award (1985)
  - Outstanding Performance Award (1987)- with Tatsumi Fujinami
  - Technique Award (1980)
- World Wrestling Promotions
  - WWP Caribbean Tag Team Championship (1 time) – with Kengo Arakawa
- World Wrestling Council
  - WWC Puerto Rico Heavyweight Championship (1 time)
  - WWC World Tag Team Championship (1 time) – with Hiro Sasaki

== Lucha de Apuesta record ==
Winner (wager)	Loser (wager)	Location	Event	Date	Notes
Halcón Ortiz (mask)	Pak Choo (hair)	Mexico City, Mexico	Live event	March 2, 1979	
