= WWF Junior Heavyweight Championship =

Professional wrestling championship

- WWWF Junior Heavyweight Championship belt (top); WWF Junior Heavyweight Championship belt (bottom)

Details
- Promotion: World Wrestling Federation (WWF); New Japan Pro-Wrestling (NJPW)
- Date established: 1965
- Date retired: October 31, 1985

Other name
- WWWF Junior Heavyweight Championship
Statistics
- Most reigns: Johnny DeFazio (4 reigns)
- Longest reign: Tatsumi Fujinami (789 days)
- Shortest reign: Ryuma Go (2 days)

The WWF Junior Heavyweight Championship (Japanese: WWF認定ジュニアヘビー級王座, Hepburn: WWF-nintei juniahebī-kyū ōza), originally known as the WWWF Junior Heavyweight Championship, is a defunct championship recognized by the World Wrestling Federation (WWF, now WWE) and New Japan Pro-Wrestling. The championship was designed for wrestlers under 100 kg (220 lb) before the creation of the IWGP Junior Heavyweight Championship. The title existed from 1965 through 1985, when the IWGP belt was introduced a year later.

== History ==
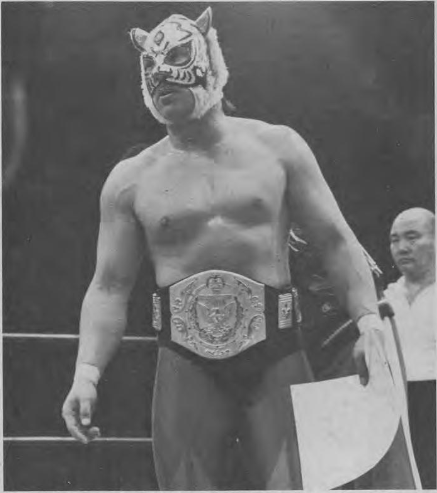
Tiger Mask with the WWF Junior Heavyweight Championship, 1982

The championship was created in 1965 by the World Wide Wrestling Federation (WWWF, later WWF) and was defended in the promotion's Pittsburgh and New England affiliates, before being vacated and abandoned in 1972. The championship was reintroduced by the WWF in 1978 and control over the championship was given to the WWF's Japanese promotional partner New Japan Pro-Wrestling (NJPW). The championship was retired for a final time on October 31, 1985, when the WWF and NJPW ended their working relationship.

In April 1994, the WWWF Junior Heavyweight Championship belt was used as a trophy for the first ever NJPW Super J-Cup, which was won by Wild Pegasus.

== Reigns ==
Over the championship's 20-year history, there were 20 reigns between 11 champions. Johnny DeFazio has the most reigns at four times. Tatsumi Fujinami's second reign it the longest at 789 days, while Ryuma Go's reign was the shortest at two days. The Cobra and Les Thornton were the final champions, simultaneously billed as such by New Japan Pro-Wrestling and the World Wrestling Federation, respectively, in 1985.

Key
| No. | Overall reign number |
| Reign | Reign number for the specific champion |
| Days | Number of days held |

| No. | Champion | Championship change | | | Reign statistics | | Notes | Ref. |
| No. | Champion | Date | Event | Location | Reign | Days | Notes | Ref. |
|---|---|---|---|---|---|---|---|---|
World Wide Wrestling Federation (WWWF)
| 1 | Paul DeGalles | September 1965 | House show | (Note: The location of the match was not captured in any known documentation.) | 1 | (Note: The exact date DeGalles won the championship is uncertain, which means that the reign lasted between 15 and 44 days.) | | |
| 2 | Johnny De Fazio | October 15, 1965 | House show | Pittsburgh, PA | 1 | (Note: The length of the championship reign is too uncertain to calculate.) | | |
| 3 | Jackie Nicholas | (Note: The date of the match was not captured in any known documentation.) | House show | New England | 1 | | | |
| 4 | Johnny De Fazio | | House show | | 2 | | | |
| 5 | Jackie Nicholas | | House show | | 2 | | | |
| 6 | Johnny De Fazio | | House show | | 3 | | | |
| 7 | Jackie Nicholas | | House show | | 3 | | | |
| 8 | Johnny De Fazio | | House show | | 4 | | | |
| — | Vacated | 1972 | — | — | — | — | Johnny DeFazio vacated the championship in 1972 upon retirement. | |
National Wrestling Alliance: World Wide Wrestling Federation (WWWF)
| 9 | Carlos Jose Estrada | January 20, 1978 | House show | Uniondale, NY | 1 | 3 | Defeated Tony Garea to reestablish the title in the WWWF. | |
| 10 | Tatsumi Fujinami | January 23, 1978 | WWWF | New York, NY | 1 | 617 | Fujinami moved to New Japan Pro-Wrestling with the championship. | |
National Wrestling Alliance: World Wrestling Federation (WWF)
| 11 | Ryuma Go | October 2, 1979 | Bloody Fight Series | Osaka, Japan | 1 | 2 | | |
| 12 | Tatsumi Fujinami | October 4, 1979 | Bloody Fight Series | Tokyo, Japan | 2 | 789 | | |
| — | Vacated | December 1, 1981 | — | — | — | — | Tatsumi Fujinami entered the heavyweight division, thus the championship was vacated. | |
| 13 | Tiger Mask | January 10, 1982 | New Year Super Fight | Tokyo, Japan | 1 | 110 | Defeated Dynamite Kid for the vacant championship. | |
| — | Vacated | April 30, 1982 | — | — | — | — | The championship was vacated after Tiger Mask suffered an injury. | |
| 14 | Black Tiger | May 6, 1982 | Big Fight Series 1982 | Fukuoka, Japan | 1 | 20 | Defeated Gran Hamada via countout in a decision match to win the vacant championship. | |
| 15 | Tiger Mask | May 26, 1982 | Big Fight Series 1982 | Osaka, Japan | 2 | 312 | | |
| — | Vacated | April 3, 1983 | — | — | — | — | Tiger Mask was injured by the Dynamite Kid in a tag team match two nights before. On the same April 3, Dynamite Kid and Kuniaki Kobayashi fought for the title and no winner was declared. | |
| 16 | Tiger Mask | June 13, 1983 | Tercera Confrontacion Mexico – Japan | Mexico City, Mexico | 3 | 60 | Defeated Fishman in decision match to win the vacant championship. | |
| — | Vacated | August 12, 1983 | — | — | — | — | The championship was vacated due to Tiger Mask retirement.. | |
World Wrestling Federation (WWF)
| 17 | Dynamite Kid | February 7, 1984 | New Year Golden Series 1984 | Tokyo, Japan | 1 | 273 | Won a tournament final match over The Cobra to win the vacant championship. | |
| — | Vacated | November 6, 1984 | — | — | — | — | The championship was vacated after Dynamite Kid left Japan to join the WWF full time, and became a tag team wrestler. | |
| 18 | The Cobra | December 28, 1984 | WWF on MSG Network | New York City, NY | 1 | 143 | Defeated Black Tiger to win the vacant championship. | |
| 19 | Hiro Saito | May 20, 1985 | IWGP & WWF Championship Series | Hiroshima, Japan | 1 | 69 | This title change was via disqualification | |
| 20 | The Cobra | July 28, 1985 | Burning Spirit in Summer | Osaka, Japan | 2 | 95 | | |
| † | Les Thornton | 1985 | — | — | — | — | The World Wrestling Federation (WWF), after its takeover of NWA Georgia Championship Wrestling, begins billing Les Thornton, the NWA World Junior Heavyweight Champion, as alternatively holding the "WWF Junior Heavyweight Championship", the "WWF Jr. Light Heavyweight Championship", or the "WWF Lt. Hvywt Championship". | |
| — | Deactivated | October 31, 1985 | — | — | — | — | Vacated and abandoned when NJPW and the WWF split. Eventually replaced by NJPW in February 1986 with the IWGP Junior Heavyweight Championship. | |

== See also ==
- IWGP Junior Heavyweight Championship
- NWA World Junior Heavyweight Championship
