= Riki Choshu =

Japanese-South Korean professional wrestler (born 1951)

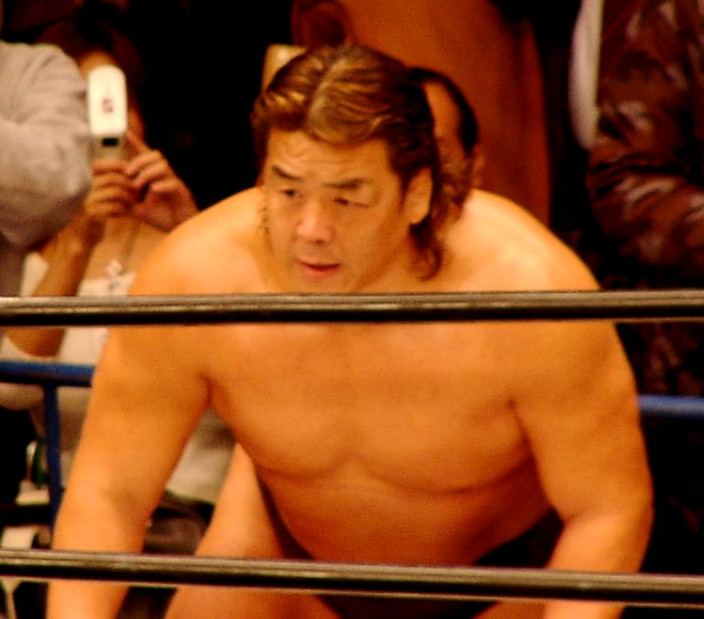
- Choshu in 2006
- Born: Kwak Kwang-Woong; December 3, 1951 (age 74); Tokuyama, Yamaguchi, Japan
- Citizenship: South Korea (until 2016) Japan (since 2016)
- Education: Senshu University School of Commerce
- Professional wrestling career
- Ring name(s): Riki Choshu; Mitsuo Yoshida
- Billed height: 1.84 m (6 ft 0 in)
- Billed weight: 120 kg (265 lb)
- Trained by: Masa Saito; Antonio Inoki; Karl Gotch; NJPW Dojo
- Debut: August 8, 1974
- Retired: June 26, 2019

Japanese name
- Kanji: 吉田 光雄
- Hiragana: よしだ みつお
- Katakana: ヨシダ ミツオ
Transcriptions
- Romanization: Yoshida Mitsuo

Korean name
- Hangul: 곽광웅
- Hanja: 郭光雄
- RR: Gwak Gwangung
- MR: Kwak Kwangung

Mitsuo Yoshida (Japanese: 吉田 光雄, romanized: Yoshida Mitsuo, born Kwak Kwang-Woong [Korean: 곽광웅]; December 3, 1951), better known by his ring name Riki Choshu (長州 力, Chōshū Riki), is a Japanese retired professional wrestler and amateur wrestler, who is best known for his longtime work in New Japan Pro-Wrestling (NJPW) as both a performer and a booker. He is considered one of Japan’s most influential wrestlers for his work in the 1980s and 1990s and is known as the first wrestler to popularize the Sasori-Gatame, better known in English as the Scorpion Deathlock or Sharpshooter.

A second-generation Zainichi Korean from Yamaguchi Prefecture, Choshu won titles in Freestyle wrestling at the National Sports Festival of Japan, before (under his birth name) representing South Korea at the 1972 Summer Olympics. He also won collegiate titles in Freestyle and Greco-Roman wrestling as captain of the Senshu University team. He made his professional wrestling debut for NJPW in 1974, becoming a major star as a heel during the following decade.

After leaving NJPW in 2002, he formed Fighting World of Japan Pro Wrestling (WJ), but eventually returned to New Japan in October 2005 as a site foreman, booker and part-time wrestler. Choshu once again left NJPW in 2010 and primarily worked in Tatsumi Fujinami’s Dradition, as well as his own self-produced Power Hall events as a freelancer.

== Early life ==
Born Kwak Kwang-Woong (Korean: 곽광웅), the youngest of four children in Tokuyama, Yamaguchi Prefecture to a Japanese mother and Korean father. His father left Korea's Chūseihoku-dō for Japan in 1939 and worked as a garbage man for much of his life. Yoshida has said that he faced discrimination from teachers in elementary school due to his Korean heritage.

Yoshida took part in baseball and judo as a teenager and after training in the judo department at Giyang Junior High School, he moved to the wrestling department of Sakurakaoka High School as a special student. He eventually came in second place in the 73 kg class of the Nagasaki National Freestyle wrestling tournament, which attracted attention from university wrestling officials and he later enrolled at Senshu University School of Commerce on a wrestling scholarship.

== Amateur wrestling career ==
Yoshida joined the amateur wrestling team at Senshu University shortly after enrolling and was teammates with Mitsushi Hirasawa, the father of future NJPW wrestler Mitsuhide Hirasawa.

In 1969, he won gold in freestyle wrestling at the National Sports Festival of Japan in the above-75 kg class.

In 1971, he won the All Japan Student Wrestling Championship in the 90 kg class. Thanks to his victory in the tournament, Kwak was selected to represent Japan in the 1972 Summer Olympics in Munich. Officials however refused to let him compete for Japan on account of him being part Korean. Nevertheless, South Korea instead invited him to join their freestyle team and he represented South Korea as a wrestler and went under his Korean name (rendered as 'Kwak Kwang-Woong').

He ended the tournament with a record of one win and two losses, and was disqualified in the third round by Cuban wrestler Bárbaro Morgan, due to the penalty points system.

When Yoshida returned to Japan, he became captain of the Senshu wrestling team in his fourth year at university and won the Freestyle and Greco-Roman 100 kg class tournaments at the All Japan Championship in 1973.

== Professional wrestling career ==
=== Early years (1974–1982) ===
Yoshida debuted in New Japan Pro-Wrestling (NJPW) in August 1974 against El Greco. In the mid-1970s, he was sent to North America to gain experience. Wrestling under his real name (Mitsuo Yoshida, sometimes referred as "Mitsu"), he appeared in George Cannon's "Superstars of Wrestling" promotion in Ontario, Canada as a heel, managed by Superstar (or Supermouth) Dave Drasen. Choshu had a brief feud with the top fan favorite of Cannon's promotion, Luis Martinez.

The ring name at the time of debut was Mitsuo Yoshida (吉田 光雄), but from April 1977 after returning from overseas training, he adopted his famously known ring name Riki Choshu after Choshu (長州) in honor of the Choshu Forces, another name for his hometown Nagato. In the 4th World League match, which he participated in when he returned to Japan, he finished third with Nikolai Volkoff, behind winner Seiji Sakaguchi and runner-up The Masked Superstar.

=== Heel Turn and New Wolves (1982–1983) ===
In the early eighties, NJPW had run a very successful Japanese vs Japanese program pitting Inoki and NJPW wrestlers against Rusher Kimura and IWE wrestlers, who were actually employed by NJPW following the dissolution of IWE. In late 1982, NJPW Chairman and booker Hisashi Shinma decided to have Choshu turn heel and create a new faction. On October 28, 1982, Choshu became the first "traitor heel" in a Japanese promotion when he turned on Inoki and Fujinami in a six man tag match. Choshu spent the rest of the year feuding with Fujinami while attracting additional supporters to his faction, then known as New Wolves. Choshu was joined by Masa Saito, to provide a more senior rival for Antonio Inoki, along with Kuniaki Kobayashi and Gran Hamada, who would feud with Tiger Mask in the junior division. Strong Kobayashi was also added to the faction, but retired before wrestling for them. On January 2, 1983, Killer Khan also turned heel on Fujinami in a tag team match to join the New Wolves. The group continued to feud with NJPW for several months, with Choshu finally defeating Fujinami by count out on April 3, 1983 to win the International title. Three weeks later, Saito lost a loser leaves town match to cover for a long trip to the United States, leaving the New Wolves without a senior leader. Though the New Wolves had only lasted a few months, NJPW's business had doubled, setting the tone for the future of puroresu where Japanese vs Japanese rivalries within a promotion would become a booking staple.

=== Ishin Gundan (1983–1984) ===
In June 1983, Choshu and former IWE faction member Animal Hamaguchi quit NJPW to form a breakaway promotion, but on July 1, 1983 they returned to NJPW TV as Ishin Gundan (Revolutionary Army) with Choshu and Hamaguchi immediately gelling as a tag team. They were joined by Tiger Toguchi (Kim Duk), Killer Khan, and Kuniaki Kobayashi, who continued his feud with Tiger Mask (Sayama). In October, former olympian Yoshiaki Yatsu joined the group. NJPW did record business as Ishin Gundan vs Seiki Gundan (NJPW) continued to dominate booking through September 1984, when Choshu suddenly left, taking most of Ishin Gundan with him to form the Japan Pro-Wrestling (JPW) promotion that "invaded" All Japan Pro Wrestling (AJPW).

=== Choshu's Army in AJPW (1985–1987) ===
Choshu attended an AJPW event on November 1, 1984 where he was challenged by Genichiro Tenryu. Tenryu was second among AJPW's top Japanese stars, behind Jumbo Tsuruta, with Baba moving to more of an emeritus role. Choshu defeated Tenryu by count out in 9:21 on February 21, 1985 in the main event of a JWP show that was not televised, but is available via bootleg tapes. Tenryu continued as Choshu's main rival through the summer of 1985. On June 21, 1985, AJPW held their first show at Budokan in almost ten years with Choshu challenging Tenryu for the United National titlein the semi-main event under Baba versus Rusher Kimura. The Budokan show aired the next day on atwo-hour prime time TV special as the popularity of AJPW soared due to the popularity of Japanese vs Japanese storylines. Choshu's jump to AJPW had immediately shifted the balance of power from New Japan to All Japan, forever changing the booking style of All Japan, which had historically relied on Japanese vs foreigner rivalries but would go on to feature Japanese vs Japanese rivalries even after Choshu jumped back to New Japan in 1987. In January 1986, Jumbo Tsuruta turned heel, running in on several of Choshu's matches to attack him with a chair and injure his ribs, setting up Choshu as a babyface within the promotion he had invaded a year earlier. In April 1986, the Calgary Hurricanes, who were also members of Choshu's stable, invaded AJPW as a new faction setting up a three-way battle between Japanese factions that lasted throughout the Summer of 1986. In early 1987, Choshu left AJPW to return to NJPW, with some members joining him, others staying behind in AJPW, and others retiring.

=== New Japan Pro-Wrestling (1987–2002) ===
Upon returning to NJPW in 1987, Choshu was a part of the Takeshi Puroresu Gundan. After NJPW split ties with Takeshi Kitano over the December 27 Sumo Hall riot, Choshu slowly climbed back up into the main event picture. In June 1988, he won his first IWGP Tag Team Championship with Masa Saito, with whom he had also partnered during a brief stint in the American Wrestling Association (AWA). At the same time, he feuded with Tatsumi Fujinami over the IWGP Heavyweight Championship. On May 27, the match ended in a no contest, in which the title was held up. Fujinami won the rematch on June 24.

In July 1989, he won his first IWGP Heavyweight Championship against Salman Hashimikov of the Soviet Union. The same month, he would also win his second IWGP Tag Team title with young up-and-comer Takayuki Iizuka. Two more IWGP Heavyweight title reigns would follow between August 19, 1990 and January 4, 1992.

In August 1996, he won the G1 Climax, winning every single match in the tournament. In 1997, he won his third IWGP Tag Team title with Kensuke Sasaki. In January 1998, he retired from the ring; for his retirement match, he wrestled five matches in one night, winning four out of five matches, defeating Tatsuhito Takaiwa, Yutaka Yoshie, Jushin Thunder Liger and Kazuyuki Fujita, only to fall to his former tag team partner Takashi Iizuka. He would focus on booking matches for NJPW after that.

=== Later Career (2000–2019) ===
Retirement did not last long, as Atsushi Onita challenged Choshu to a barbed wire deathmatch in 2000. Choshu accepted and wrestled Onita in a deadly squash, where Choshu ended up winning. He then balanced wrestling and booking for NJPW, until his departure in 2002, stemming from the departures of Keiji Mutoh and Satoshi Kojima, among others, to AJPW, which caused his position of head booker taken away.

After leaving NJPW, he formed Fighting World of Japan Pro Wrestling in 2003, which would later be changed to Riki Pro, after the failure of some of their big shows. He ran Riki Pro until 2005 when he returned to NJPW as a site foreman, booker and wrestler. In 2007, Choshu joined the Legend stable with Masahiro Chono, Jushin Thunder Liger and AKIRA.

Choshu also promotes an occasional series of events called "LOCK UP", which feature talent from New Japan and other promotions. New Japan supported this financially until 2008 before withdrawing.

In 2012, Choshu was booked in a series of matches for LEGEND The Pro Wrestling and Dradition.

On June 26, 2019, Choshu teamed with Tomohiro Ishii and Shiro Koshinaka in a six-man tag team match against Tatsumi Fujinami, Keiji Mutoh, and Togi Makabe. Fujinami's team won when Makabe pinned Choshu. In the post-match, Choshu officially announced his retirement from professional wrestling.

== Personal life ==
Yoshida became a naturalized Japanese citizen in 2016, and adopted his first ring name (Mitsuo Yoshida;吉田 光雄) as his legal name.

== Other media ==
Choshu appears as a gang member in the 2017 video game Yakuza Kiwami 2, alongside Genichiro Tenryu, Keiji Mutoh, Masahiro Chono and Tatsumi Fujinami.

== Championships and accomplishments ==
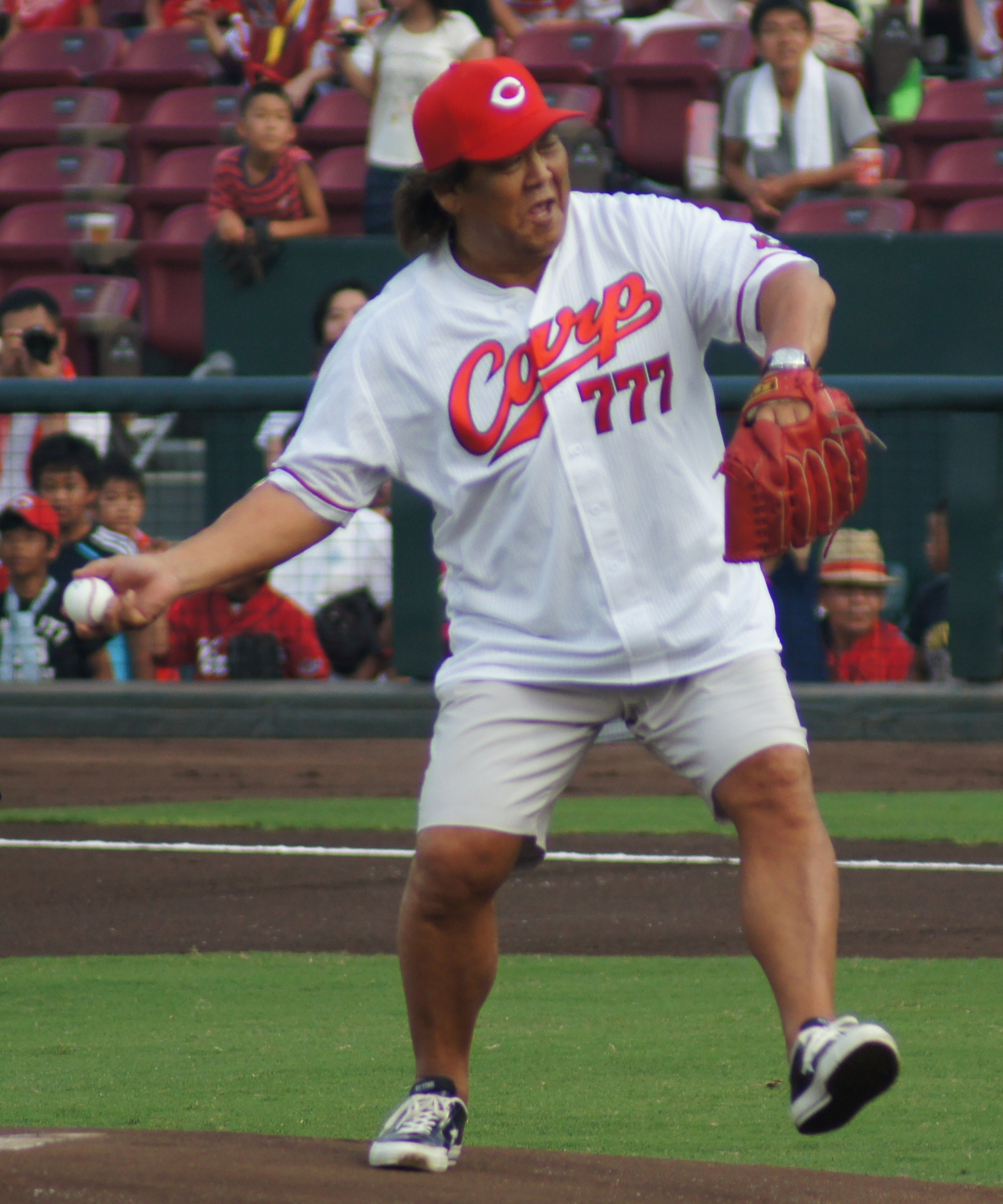
On July 30, 2013, Choshu threw out the ceremonial first pitch for a Hiroshima Toyo Carp game at Mazda Stadium

- All Japan Pro Wrestling
  - NWA International Tag Team Championship (1 time) – with Yoshiaki Yatsu
  - PWF World Heavyweight Championship (1 time)
- Fighting World of Japan Pro Wrestling
  - WMG Tag Team Championship (1 time) – with Genichiro Tenryu
- International Professional Wrestling Hall of Fame
  - Class of 2022
- New Japan Pro-Wrestling
  - Greatest 18 Championship (1 time)
  - IWGP Heavyweight Championship (3 times)
  - IWGP Tag Team Championship (3 times) – with Masa Saito (1), Takashi Iizuka (1), and Kensuke Sasaki (1)
  - NWA North American Tag Team Championship (Los Angeles/Japan version) (1 time) – with Seiji Sakaguchi
  - WWF International Heavyweight Championship (1 time)
  - World Cup Tournament (1989)
  - G1 Climax (1996)
  - Super Grade Tag League (1992) – with Shinya Hashimoto
  - Six Man Tag Team Cup League (1988) – with Antonio Inoki and Kantaro Hoshino
- Pro Wrestling Illustrated
  - PWI ranked him #55 of the 500 best singles wrestlers in the PWI 500 in 1993
  - PWI ranked him #30 of the 500 best singles wrestlers during the "PWI Years" in 2003
  - PWI ranked him #17, and #25 of the 100 best tag team of the "PWI Years" with Yoshiaki Yatsu and Animal Hamaguchi, respectively, in 2003
- Tokyo Sports
  - Distinguished Service Award (1983)
  - Effort Award (1977)
  - Fighting Spirit Award (1979, 1986, 1988, 1989)
  - Match of the Year Award (1983) vs. Tatsumi Fujinami on April 3
  - Match of the Year Award (1984) vs. Antonio Inoki on August 2
  - Match of the Year Award (1985) vs. Jumbo Tsuruta on November 4
  - Match of the Year Award (1993) vs. Genichiro Tenryu on January 4
  - Service Award (1997)
  - Technique Award (1981)
- Universal Wrestling Association
  - UWA World Heavyweight Championship (1 time)
  - UWA World Tag Team Championship (1 time) – with Gran Hamada
- Wrestling Observer Newsletter
  - Best Booker (1992)
  - Promoter of the Year (1995, 1996, 1997)
  - Wrestler of the Year (1987)
  - Wrestling Observer Newsletter Hall of Fame (Class of 1996)
