= Akira Maeda =

Japanese combat sport event promoter, professional wrestler and mixed martial artist

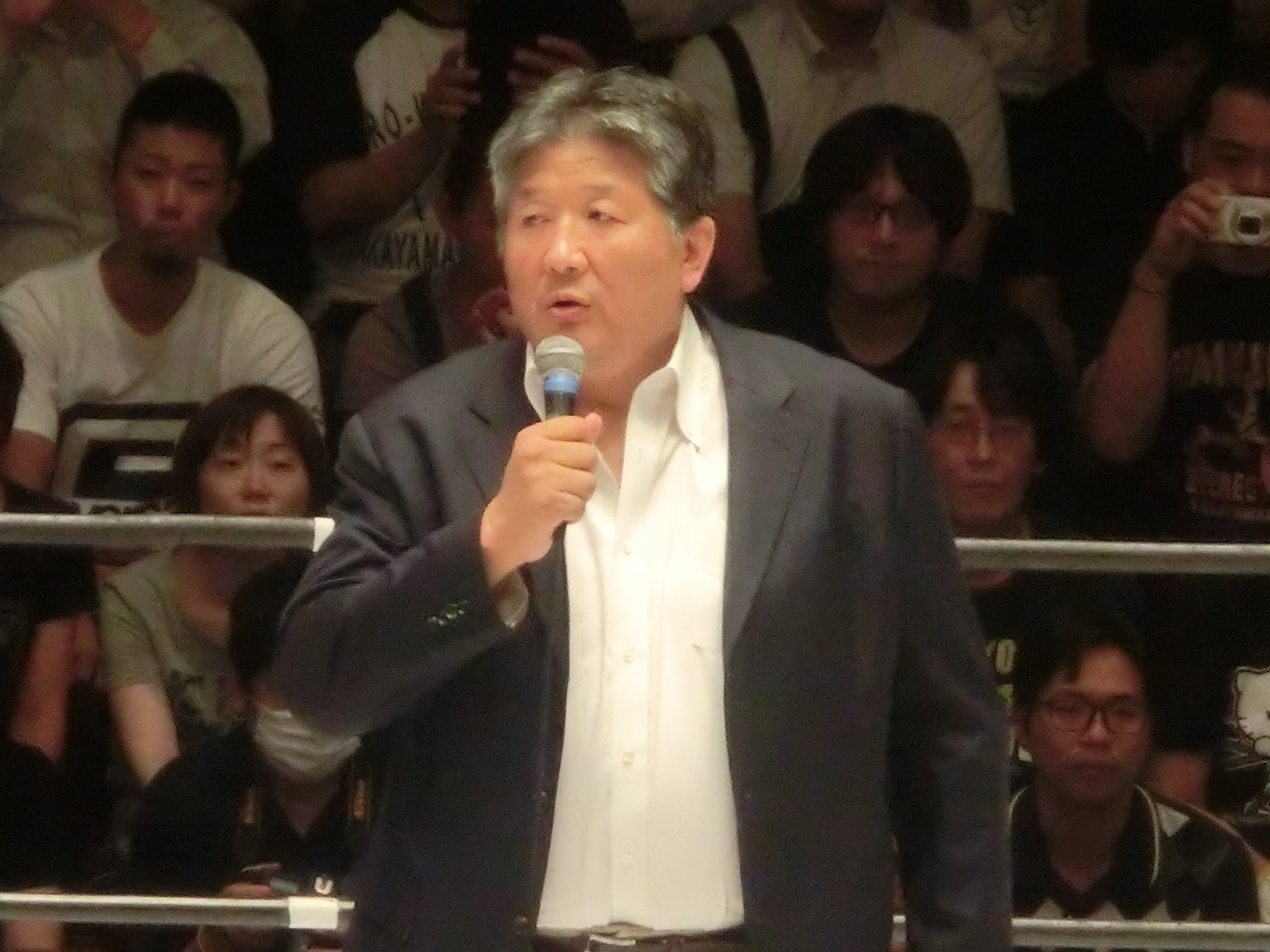
- Maeda in 2018
- Born: Go Il-myeong; January 24, 1959 (age 67); Osaka, Japan
- Height: 6 ft 3 in (191 cm)
- Weight: 225 lb (102 kg; 16 st 1 lb)
- Division: Heavyweight
- Team: Rings Japan
- Rank: Eighth degree black belt in Kyokushin Budokai
- Years active: 1995–1999

Mixed martial arts record
- Total: 11
- Wins: 6
- By submission: 3
- Unknown: 3
- Losses: 5
- By submission: 3
- By decision: 1
- Unknown: 1

Other information
- Mixed martial arts record from Sherdog

Akira Maeda 前田日明
Personal information
- Born: January 24, 1959 (age 67) Osaka, Japan

Professional wrestling career
- Ring name(s): Kwik-kik-Lee; Akira Maeda
- Billed height: 6 ft 3 in (191 cm)
- Billed weight: 225 lb (102 kg)
- Trained by: Karl Gotch; Yoshiaki Fujiwara
- Debut: August 25, 1978 (vs Kotetsu Yamamoto)
- Retired: February 21, 1999 (vs Alexander Karelin)

Akira Maeda (前田 日明, Maeda Akira) (born Go Il-myeong (Hangul: 고일명, Hanja: 高日明), January 24, 1959) is a Japanese mixed martial arts promoter, writer and retired professional wrestler and mixed martial artist. Maeda was also known by the ring name Kwik-kik-Lee during his time on the British wrestling's slot on the sports show World of Sport (WoS). Maeda helped develop the shoot-style of professional wrestling during the late 1980s. He founded Fighting Network RINGS in 1991 which would become one of the top MMA promotions before it folded in 2002.

== Professional wrestling career ==
=== New Japan Pro Wrestling (1978–1984) ===
Maeda entered the New Japan Pro-Wrestling (NJPW) dojo in 1978, after being discovered at a karate tournament, and debuted the same year. Like many other New Japan stars before and after him, Maeda embarked on a foreign tour to the United Kingdom in 1982, where he adopted the Kwik-kik-Lee moniker. In 1983, he participated in the first International Wrestling Grand Prix tournament, won by Hulk Hogan. He was one of three Japanese entrants to the international tournament, alongside Antonio Inoki and Rusher Kimura.

=== World Wrestling Federation (1984) ===
Maeda would briefly join Vince McMahon's WWF for a few months in the Spring of 1984 working in the opening matches of shows and even appearing a few times in televised bouts. He defeated Pierre Lefebvre in a tournament final for the vacated WWF International Heavyweight Championship on March 25 in Madison Square Gardens.

=== Universal Wrestling Federation (1984–1985) ===
In 1984, Maeda, Yoshiaki Fujiwara, and other New Japan defectors formed the Japanese UWF. It was during his time in the first incarnation of the UWF that his willingness to show his displeasure in the ring became known; he quarreled with Satoru Sayama (the original Tiger Mask) over the direction of the UWF, as Maeda and other wrestlers were reportedly resentful of Sayama's cramming too much creative power. This included booking himself to win all his matches, where others, Maeda included, "jobbed" in the worked matches. The promotion folded a year later, and Maeda returned to New Japan, where he became one of the promotion's biggest stars.

=== Return to New Japan Pro Wrestling (1985–1988) ===
Maeda became involved in a real-life feud with New Japan booker and top star, Antonio Inoki, refusing to work with him in what could have been a huge moneymaking program.

In April 1986, he was involved in one of the most surreal moments in wrestling history during a match with André the Giant; neither man could agree to losing the match. Andre appeared drunk and started no selling Maeda's moves. Then Maeda proceeded to shoot kick André's legs and repeatedly take him down. After nearly 30 minutes of this, André voluntarily laid down to be pinned (in spite of being assured that Maeda would lose the match), but Akira refused to do so. Inoki eventually came to the ring and demanded the match to end as a No Contest, much to the bewilderment of the audience.

On November 19, 1987, during a six-man tag team match, as Riki Choshu was putting Osamu Kido in a Sasori-gatame, Maeda delivered a stiff kick to Choshu's face, breaking his orbital bone. The flow of the match was disrupted, as Choshu then tried to attack Maeda, and a finish had to be improvised. The resulting injury would sideline Choshu for well over a month and Maeda was immediately suspended for his actions. The promotion's management offered Maeda to lift the suspension in exchange for going on a training excursion to Mexico to learn lucha libre, but Maeda refused and abandoned New Japan along with his partners in February 1988.

Although the kick is popularly believed to have been a deliberate attack, Maeda has claimed it was actually an accident, with Choshu having supposedly failed at protecting his face at the cue (a tap on his back) before the kick was thrown. Referee Mr. Takahashi, despite disapproving Maeda's stiff style, has agreed it was an accident on a scripted spot, declaring that such miscommunications were not uncommon at the time. Years later, Maeda and Choshu reconciled amicably, to the point where Maeda attended his retirement ceremony.

=== Newborn UWF (1988–1990) ===
In 1988, Maeda formed Newborn UWF with Nobuhiko Takada and others, this time as its number one star, using the notoriety he gained in New Japan to draw large crowds. Maeda's UWF became the first promotion to hold a show at the Tokyo Dome, drawing 60,000 to watch Maeda defeat Willy Wilhelm in the main event. In December 1990, Newborn UWF dissolved due to disagreements over the direction of the company.

== Mixed martial arts career ==
=== Fighting Network RINGS (1991–2002) ===
Maeda would go on to form Fighting Network RINGS in 1991, while Nobuhiko Takada formed Union of Wrestling Force International with most of the Newborn UWF roster. Fighting Network RINGS would no longer bill itself as wrestling in 1997, after the collapse of UWF International, holding shoot style wrestling matches, legitimate mixed-style fights and later competitive mixed martial arts on the same cards since 1992. In 1999 he retired from active competition after being defeated in a match against three-time Olympic Gold medalist Alexander Karelin, drawing an incredible gate of $2.5 million. The match gained widespread media coverage, including mentions in The New York Times and Sports Illustrated.

Following Maeda's retirement, he switched his promotion's style from shoot style to fully competitive mixed martial arts fighting. The new Rings held two King of Kings tournaments, which introduced such mixed martial artists as Fedor Emelianenko, Dan Henderson, Randy Couture, Jeremy Horn and Antônio Rodrigo Nogueira to the Japanese audience. RINGS folded in 2002, due to the growing popularity of PRIDE.

=== Revived Rings (2008–present) ===
When K-1 wanted to start a new MMA brand after their previous attempt with K-1 Romanex, Fighting and Entertainment Group hired Maeda as a consultant for Hero's. However, FEG retired Hero's in February 2008 to team up with former PRIDE staff to create DREAM. Maeda's new project was called The Outsider, an amateur MMA series that uses Hero's rules. RINGS brand was revived for The Outsider series and several events have been held since March 30, 2008.

On January 22, 2012, Maeda decisively resurrected the Fighting Network RINGS brand with Battle Genesis: Vol. 9, the continuation of the Battle Genesis series the last event of which was held on September 20, 2001. The event was sanctioned by ZST.

== Mixed martial arts record ==
Akira Maeda's Mixed Martial Arts record. The validity of matches is contested.

Professional record breakdown
11 matches	6 wins	5 losses
By submission	3	3
By decision	0	1
Unknown	3	1

Res.	Record	Opponent	Method	Event	Date	Round	Time	Location	Notes
Loss	6–5	Alexander Karelin	Decision (unanimous)	Rings: Final Capture	February 21, 1999	3	5:00	Japan	
Win	6–4	Magomedkhan Gamzatkhanov	Submission	Rings: Battle Dimensions Tournament 1997 Final	January 21, 1998	1	4:24	Japan	
Loss	5–4	Kiyoshi Tamura	n/a	Rings: Battle Dimensions Tournament 1997 Final	January 21, 1998	n/a	n/a	Japan	
Win	5–3	Mitsuya Nagai	n/a	Rings: Battle Dimensions Tournament 1997 Final	January 21, 1998	n/a	n/a	Japan	
Win	4–3	Nikolai Zouev	Submission (rear-naked choke)	Rings – Mega Battle Tournament 1997 Semifinal 1	October 25, 1997	1	5:17	Japan	
Win	3–3	Andrei Kopylov	Submission (rear-naked choke)	Rings – Extension Fighting 7	September 26, 1997	1	8:32	Japan	
Loss	2–3	Magomedkhan Gamzatkhanov	Submission (leg lock)	Rings – Extension Fighting 2	April 22, 1997	1	8:47	Japan	
Win	2–2	Yoshihisa Yamamoto	Submission	Rings – Budokan Hall 1996	January 24, 1996	n/a	n/a	Tokyo, Japan	
Win	1–2	Dick Vrij	n/a	Rings – Battle Dimensions Tournament 1995 Opening Round	October 21, 1995	n/a	n/a	Japan	
Loss	0–2	Chris Dolman	Submission (armbar)	Rings Holland – Free Fight	February 19, 1995	2	4:07	Amsterdam, Holland	
Loss	0–1	Magomedkhan Gamzatkhanov	Submission	Rings – Budokan Hall 1995	January 25, 1995	n/a	n/a	Tokyo, Japan	

== Personal life ==
Maeda's interest in martial arts developed as a schoolboy while watching the Ultraman television series. By the time he was in high school, his only interests were motorcycles and karate. He is friends with Mother series creator Shigesato Itoi.

Maeda was a third-generation Zainichi Korean prior to naturalization.

He is an 8th degree black belt in Kyokushin Budokai and has stated that he has a black belt in Shorinji Kempo.

== Works ==
- (1988) Challenge to the Fight King (格闘王への挑戦, Kakutō-ō e no chōsen) ISBN 4062040816
- (1988) Power of Dream (パワー・オブ・ドリーム, Pawā obu dorīmu) ISBN 404173701X
- (1992) Who to live for (誰のために生きるか, Dare no tame ni ikiru ka) ISBN 4569536352
- (1994) Build you strongest self: Over the rev limit (最強の自分をつくる - オーバー・ザ・レブ・リミット, Saikyō no jibun o tsukuru - ōbā za rebu rimitto) ISBN 4569542026
- (1994) The true legend of combat sports, RINGS (真格闘技伝説 RINGS, Ma kakutōgi densetsu ringu) ISBN 4870311895
- (1998) Uncrowned Akira Maeda (無冠 前田日明, Mukan Akira Maeda) by Toru Sasaki (Shueisha) ISBN 408780285X
- (1999) Fighting with real swords (真剣勝負, Shinken shōbu) ISBN 4794209177 - With Kazuya Fukuda
- (2009) Japanese soul (日本魂, Nihon tamashī) ISBN 9784062154024 - With Kotetsu Yamamoto
- (2011) "To obtain an absolutely undefeated mind and body that survives the present, 'Men's Meditation'" (今を生き抜く絶対不敗の心と体を得るために 「男の瞑想学」, “Ima o ikinuku zettai fuhai no kokoro to karada o eru tame ni `otoko no meisō-gaku'”) ISBN 978-4862206237
- (2017) "The entire history of UWF told by Akira Maeda - Above" (前田日明が語るUWF全史 上, Maeda akira ga kataru UWF zenshi-jō”) ISBN 978-4309921365
- (2017) "The entire history of UWF toldabout by Akira Maeda - Below" (前田日明が語るUWF全史 下, Maeda akira ga kataru UWF zenshi-ka”) ISBN 978-4309921372
- (2021) "Japanese should be happier" (日本人はもっと幸せになっていいはずだ, Nihonjin wa motto shiawase ni natte ī hazuda”) ISBN 978-4866251424

== Championships and accomplishments ==
- Joint Promotions
  - European Heavyweight Championship (1 time)
- Fighting Network RINGS
  - RINGS Battle Dimensions Tournament (1993–1996)
- New Japan Pro-Wrestling
  - IWGP Tag Team Championship (2 times) – with Osamu Kido (1) and Nobuhiko Takada (1)
  - Greatest Wrestlers (Class of 2009)
- Pro Wrestling Illustrated
  - PWI ranked him #40 of the 500 best singles wrestlers during the "PWI Years" in 2003
  - PWI ranked him #13 of the 100 best tag teams during the "PWI Years" with Nobuhiko Takada in 2003
- Tokyo Sports
  - Effort Award (1981)
  - Match of the Year Award (1986) vs. Tatsumi Fujinami on June 12
  - MVP Award (1989)
  - Special Grand Prize (1988)
  - Technique Award (1983)
- Universal Wrestling Federation
  - UWF Heavyweight Championship (1 time)
- World Wrestling Federation
  - WWF International Heavyweight Championship (1 time)
- Wrestling Observer Newsletter awards
  - Promoter of the Year (1989)
  - Wrestler of the Year (1988)
  - Wrestling Observer Newsletter Hall of Fame (Class of 1996)

== Filmography ==
Year	Title	Role
1989	YAWARA! a fashionable judo girl!	Himself
2006	Waru	

== Notes ==
1.Per Fighting Network Rings practice of having both worked professional wrestling matches and legitimate Mixed Martial Arts bouts, it is not certain which matches are real or fixed. Matches between 1991 and 1994 can be verified of being worked, but there is also no certain indication that the matches from 1995 onwards are fully legitimate.
