= Tatsumi Fujinami =

Japanese professional wrestler (born 1953)

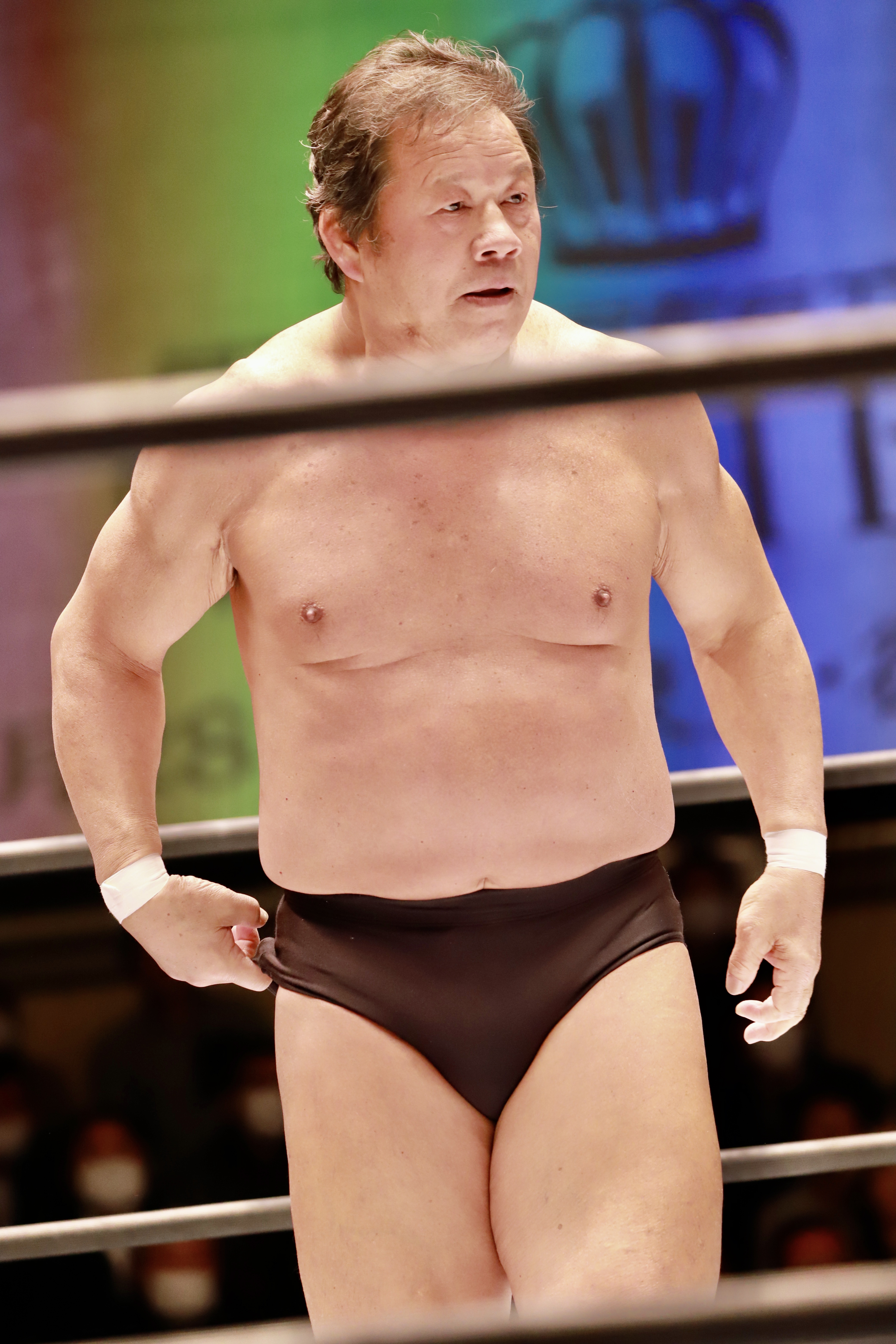
- Fujinami in 2020

Personal information
- Born: December 28, 1953 (age 72) Kunisaki, Ōita, Japan
- Spouse: Kaori Fujinami

Professional wrestling career
- Ring names: Dr. Fujinami; Ox Fujinami; Ring Fujinami; Tatsumi Fujinami
- Billed height: 1.83 m (6 ft 0 in)
- Billed weight: 103 kg (227 lb)
- Trained by: Karl Gotch; Antonio Inoki; Kotetsu Yamamoto
- Debut: 1971

Tatsumi Fujinami (藤波 辰巳, Fujinami Tatsumi; ring name: 藤波 辰爾) (born December 28, 1953) is a Japanese professional wrestler. He is best known for his long tenure with New Japan Pro-Wrestling (NJPW), where he was a six-time IWGP Heavyweight Champion and four-time IWGP Tag Team Champion. He is also the owner and founder of the Dradition wrestling promotion.

Known for his fluid catch wrestling submission style, Fujinami is nicknamed "The Dragon"; he is credited with inventing moves such as the dragon sleeper and the dragon suplex. Other championships held by Fujinami include the National Wrestling Alliance (NWA) World Heavyweight Champion and World Wrestling Federation (WWF) International Heavyweight Champion. He is an inductee of the International Professional Wrestling Hall of Fame, Professional Wrestling Hall of Fame, Wrestling Observer Newsletter Hall of Fame, and WWE Hall of Fame. Bret Hart said of Fujinami: "I always wanted to be the great wrestler that Tatsumi Fujinami was."

== Professional wrestling career ==
=== Japanese Wrestling Association (1971) ===
Fujinami was trained to wrestle by Antonio Inoki, Karl Gotch, and Kotetsu Yamamoto. He debuted in the Japanese Wrestling Association (JWA) in 1971 at the age of 17. His early opponents included Akio Sato and Mitsuo Momota.

=== New Japan Pro-Wrestling (1972–1975) ===
When Inoki was fired from JWA in 1971, Fujinami and several other wrestlers followed him to his new promotion, New Japan Pro-Wrestling (NJPW). Fujinami wrestled his first match for NJPW in March 1972, shortly after its formation. In the early years of his career, he competing in the junior heavyweight division, serving as an opponent for debuting rookies, such as Mr. Pogo, Yoshiaki Fujiwara, and Gran Hamada.

In late-1974, Fujinami, Fujiwara, Hamada and three other rookies competed in the Karl Gotch Cup (a tournament for rookies, forerunner to the later Young Lion Cup). Fujinami won the Cup by defeating Masashi Ozawa in Kariya, Aichi.

=== International seasoning (1975–1978) ===
Beginning in 1975, Fujinami was sent to wrestle abroad for seasoning. In June 1975, he began wrestling for the Internationaler Berufsringkämpfer-Verband (IBV) in Germany. He made his final appearance for the IBV in October 1975.

In December 1975, Fujinami made his United States debut in a match for NWA Hollywood Wrestling, defeating Mickey Doyle in a bout in Los Angeles' Grand Olympic Auditorium.

In March 1976, Fujinami began wrestling for Jim Crockett Promotions in the United States as "Dr. Fujinami" (or "Dr. Fujiani"). He wrestled his final match for Jim Crockett Promotions in March 1977, losing to Ricky Ferrara in the Richmond Arena.

In May 1977, Fujinami began wrestling for Mexico's Universal Wrestling Association (UWA). In his debut match, he unsuccessfully challenged UWA World Middleweight Champion René Guajardo in Monterrey's Plaza de Toros La Monumental. Later that month, he unsuccessfully challenged UWA World Light Heavyweight Champion El Solitario in the Palacio de los Deportes. He left the UWA in December 1977.

After a brief return to NWA Hollywood Wrestling, in January 1978, Fujinami debuted in the World Wide Wrestling Federation (WWWF). In his debut match in New York City's Madison Square Garden, he defeated José Estrada for the WWWF Junior Heavyweight Championship. Later that month, he successfully defended the title against the Masked Canadian in the Grand Olympic Auditorium. In February 1978, he successfully defended the title against Ted Adams in Madison Square Garden.

=== New Japan Pro-Wrestling (1978–2006) ===
==== Junior Heavyweight Champion (1978–1981) ====
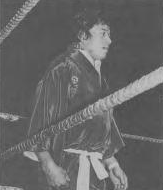
Fujinami in the WWWF, c. 1980

In March 1978, Fujinami returned to NJPW, having spent nearly three years wrestling around the world. He brought the WWWF Junior Heavyweight Championship with him, defending it both in NJPW and overseas. In April–May 1978, Fujinami competed in the inaugural MSG Series round robin tournament, placing fourth with 38 points. In November–December 1978, he competed in the Pre-Japan Championship League, which was won by Antonio Inoki.

In April–June 1979, Fujinami took part in the second MSG Series tournament, placing fifth with 22 points. In October 1979, he lost the WWWF Junior Heavyweight Championship to Ryuma Go in the Osaka Prefectural Gymnasium, ending his reign after 21 months. He regained the title from Go just two days later in Tokyo's Kuramae Kokugikan.

In February 1980, Fujinami faced NWA International Junior Heavyweight Champion Steve Keirn in a title versus title match in the Nakajima Sports Center in Sapporo; he defeated Keirn to become a double champion. Later that month, he lost the NWA International Junior Heavyweight Championship to Mike Graham in a bout for Championship Wrestling from Florida in the Hollywood Sportatorium in Hollywood, Florida. In April 1980, Fujinami regained the NWA International Junior Heavyweight Championship from Graham in a bout in Kawasaki, Kanagawa. In April–June 1980, he competed in the third MSG Series, placing six with 20 points. In July 1980, he vacated the NWA International Junior Heavyweight Championship. In August 1980, Fujinami successfully defended his WWWF Junior Heavyweight Championship against Chavo Guerrero at the WWWF's Showdown at Shea event in New York City's Shea Stadium. In November–December 1980, Fujinami and Kengo Kimura competed in the inaugural MSG Tag League, placing sixth with 15 points.

In May–June 1981, Fujinami competed in the fourth MGS Series tournament, placing sixth with 29 points. In November–December 1981, he competed in the second MSG Tag League with Antonio Inoki as his partner; the duo placed joint second with eight points. In December 1981, he vacated the WWWF Junior Heavyweight Championship upon moving to NJPW's heavyweight division, ending his second reign after 14 months.

==== Heavyweight division (1981–1985) ====
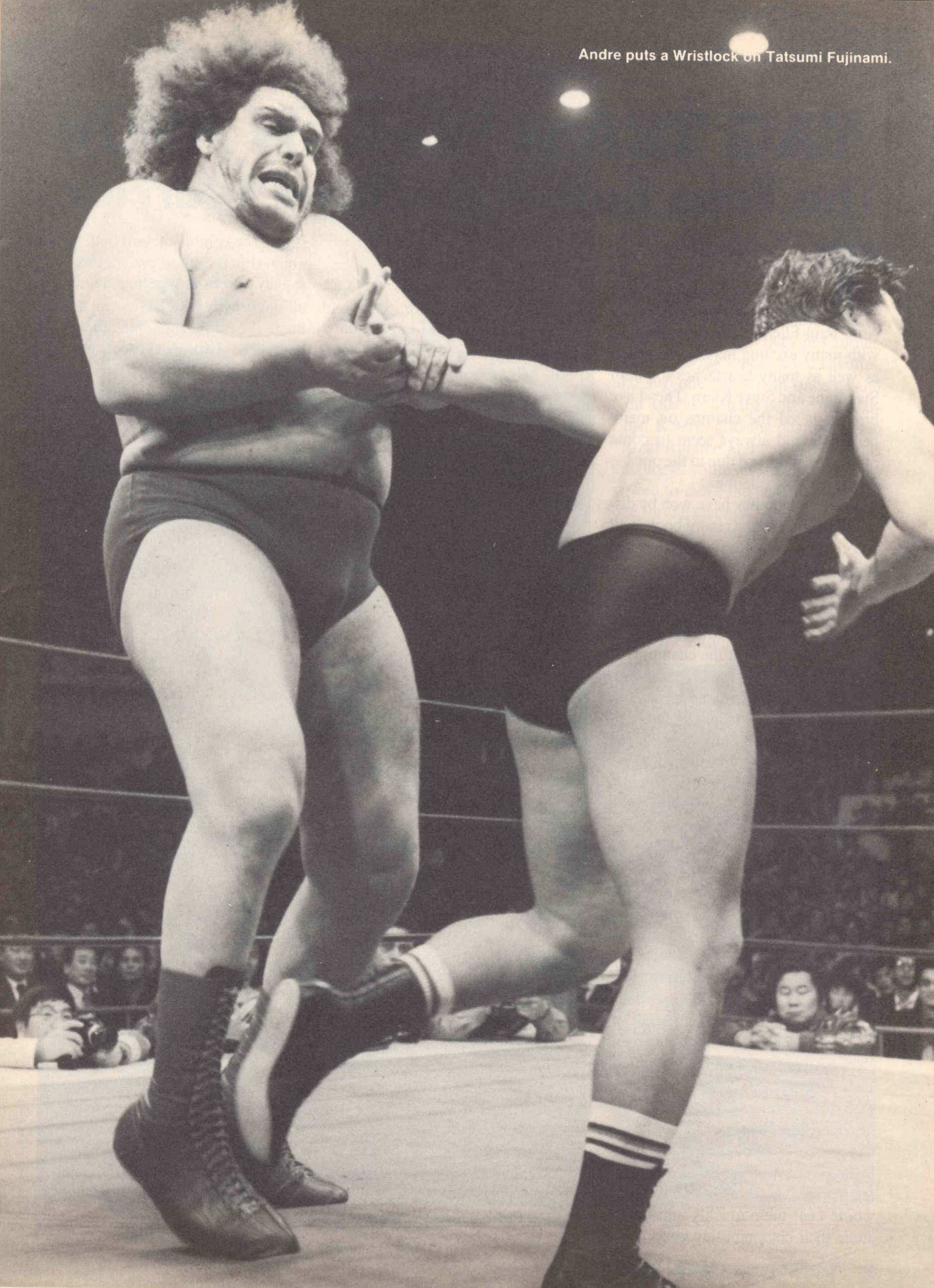
Fujinami (right) wrestling André the Giant, c. 1985

In late-1981, Fujinami was moved to the heavyweight division to make room for Tiger Mask in the junior heavyweight division. In January 1982, in a bout that aired on the New Year Super Fight on TV Asahi, he unsuccessfully challenged WWF World Heavyweight Champion Bob Backlund in Tokyo's Korakuen Hall. Beginning in January 1982, Fujinami began teaming with Antonio Inoki and other wrestlers to face gaijin wrestlers in a series of six-man tag team matches, with his opponents including Hulk Hogan, André the Giant, Bret Hart, Dynamite Kid, Dusty Rhodes, Abdullah the Butcher, and Dick Murdoch. In March–April 1982, Fujinami competed in the MSG Series, placing sixth out of 14 wrestlers with 35 points.

In August 1982, Fujinami defeated Gino Brito for the WWF International Heavyweight Championship in a bout in New York's Madison Square Garden in the United States that aired on WWF on MSG Network. After successful defences against Masked Superstar and Kengo Kimura, he lost the title to Riki Choshu in an April 1983 bout in Tokyo's Kuramae Kokugikan. In May 1983, Fujinami defeated El Canek in a bout for the Universal Wrestling Association in Mexico City to win the UWA World Heavyweight Championship. He lost the title to El Canek in Mexico City the following month. In August 1983, Fujinami defeated Choshu in the Kuramae Kokugikan to win the WWF International Heavyweight Championship for a second time. In November–December 1983, he and Akira Maeda competed in the MSG Tag League, placing fifth with 24 points.

In May–June 1984, Fujinami competed in the IWGP League, placing third out of 14 wrestlers with 34 points. In November–December 1984, he competed in the MSG Tag League with Antonio Inoki as his partner; they defeated Adrian Adonis and Dick Murdoch in the Osaka Prefectural Gymnasium to win the tournament. Later that month, he took part in an NJPW tour of the Philippines, where he teamed with Kengo Kimura to unsuccessfully challenge Adonis and Murdoch for the WWF World Tag Team Championship in the Araneta Coliseum in Quezon City and successfully defended his WWF International Heavyweight Championship against Adonis in the Rizal Memorial Stadium in Manila.

In February 1985, Fujinami unsuccessfully challenged WWF World Heavyweight Champion Hulk Hogan in a bout in the Aichi Prefectural Gymnasium that aired on TV Asahi. In May–June 1985, he competed in the IWGP League, losing in the finals to André the Giant.

==== Tag Team Champion (1985–1988) ====
In May 1985, Fujinami and Kengo Kimura defeated Adrian Adonis and Dick Murdoch in the finals of a tournament for the revived WWF International Tag Team Championship. The championship was abandoned that October when the WWF ended its partnership with NJPW. In July 1985, Fujinami gave up his WWF International Heavyweight Championship after wrestling Super Strong Machine to a double disqualification.

In November–December 1985, Fujinami and Kimura competed in the IWGP Tag Team League to crown the inaugural IWGP Tag Team Champions. They defeated Antonio Inoki and Seiji Sakaguchi in the finals in Sendai to become the champions. They held the titles until August 1986, when they lost to Akira Maeda and Osamu Kido in Tokyo's Ryōgoku Kokugikan. In September 1986, they defeated Maeda and Kido in Tokyo's Korakuen Hall to win the IWGP Tag Team Championship for a second time. Subsequently, tension developed between Fujinami and Kimura, leading the partners to face each other in a series of matches. This culminated in a special televised bout, the "Fierce Fight Special", in the Korakuen Hall with Umanosuke Ueda as special guest referee, where Fujinami defeated Kimura. In February 1987, the former partners vacated the IWGP Tag Team Championship. Subsequently, Fujinami teamed with George Takano in a tournament for the vacant titles that was won by Keiji Muto and Shiro Koshinaka.

In mid-1987, Fujinami and Kimura reconciled and reformed their tag team. In November–December 1987, they entered the IWGP Tag Team League, defeating Antonio Inoki and Dick Murdoch in the finals to win the tournament. In January 1988, they defeated Kazuo Yamazaki and Yoshiaki Fujiwara in Tokuyama, Yamaguchi to win the IWGP Tag Team Championship for a third time.

==== Heavyweight Champion (1988–1998) ====
1988 proved to be Fujinami's banner year. On May 8, he defeated Big Van Vader by disqualification in Tokyo's Ariake Coliseum to win the IWGP Heavyweight Championship vacated by Antonio Inoki, making him a double champion. 19 days later, however, the title was held up after he fought Riki Choshu to a no contest in the Miyagi Prefectural Sports Center. In June 1988, Fujinami and Kimura lost the IWGP Tag Team Championship to Masa Saito and Riki Choshu in the Hiroshima Prefectural Sports Center. Later that month, Fujinami defeated Choshu in the Osaka Prefectural Gymnasium to win the vacant IWGP Heavyweight Championship for a second time. In the subsequent weeks, he retained the title in bouts against Vader in the Nagoya Rainbow Hall and against Inoki in the Yokohama Cultural Gymnasium.

In October 1988, Fujinami made an excursion to the United States, defeating The Grappler for the NWA Pacific Northwest Heavyweight Championship in the Portland Sports Arena in Portland, Oregon for Pacific Northwest Wrestling, wrestling WCWA World Heavyweight Champion Kerry Von Erich to a no contest in a bout in the Dallas Sportatorium for World Class Wrestling Association, and losing to AWA World Heavyweight Champion Jerry Lawler by disqualification in the Mid-South Coliseum in Memphis, Tennessee in a bout for the Continental Wrestling Association.

1989 proved to be a heartbreaking year for Fujinami. In April, he vacated the title to be determined in a tournament at Battle Satellite in Tokyo Dome, NJPW's first Tokyo Dome show; he would lose to eventual winner Big Van Vader in the semi-finals. In June, during a match with Vader, Fujinami suffered a severe back injury and pulled a hernia. He wouldn't wrestle at all until he returned in September 1990, changing his kanji from "辰巳" to "辰爾" (both are pronounced Tatsumi).

In December 1990, he regained the title he never lost, the IWGP Heavyweight title from Choshu. His reign was short-lived, as he lost the title to Vader a month later. Fujinami rebounded by regaining the title two months later. in March 1991 at WCW/New Japan Supershow I, Fujinami made history, as he defeated Ric Flair to win the NWA World Heavyweight Championship, making him the very first man to hold the IWGP and NWA World titles simultaneously.

In May 1991, Fujinami defended his NWA World Heavyweight title against Flair in a title vs. title re-match at the World Championship Wrestling pay-per-view SuperBrawl I in Florida in the United States. Flair retained his WCW Championship and regained Fujinami's NWA title by a school boy pin with a handful of tights.

In 1993, Fujinami won the G1 Climax tournament, defeating Yoshiaki Fujiwara, Osamu Kido, Keiji Mutoh, and Hiroshi Hase to win the tournament. In April 1994, he defeated Shinya Hashimoto to win his fifth IWGP Heavyweight title, but lost it back to Hashimoto three weeks later. In January 1997, he reunited with Kengo Kimura to win the IWGP Tag Team titles from Masahiro Chono and Hiroyoshi Tenzan. They would hold onto the belts for over three months before losing them to Riki Choshu and Kensuke Sasaki. In April 1998, Fujinami won his sixth and final IWGP Heavyweight title by defeating Sasaki. He would hold onto the belt for over four months, before losing the title to Chono.

==== President of NJPW; departure (1999–2006) ====
Fujinami decreased his work load upon being named President of NJPW in 1999 (he was nevertheless ousted in 2004). His last title reign in NJPW was an IWGP Tag Team Championship with disciple Osamu Nishimura in October 2001, and his last title shot ever was a Triple Crown Heavyweight Championship bout against Keiji Mutoh in December of the same year (Mutoh had not affiliated himself exclusively with AJPW at the time).

In 2006, after nearly 35 years in the company, Fujinami left NJPW, after giving an ultimatum of either Riki Choshu leave or Fujinami leave. New Japan stuck with Choshu, causing Fujinami to leave. Another veteran and Fujinami's long-time tag team partner, Kengo Kimura, would follow suit.

=== Late career (2006–present) ===
In 2006, Fujinami and Nishimura began running their Muga promotion again, focusing on pure catch wrestling. In a tag team dream match, Fujinami, along with his close friend Nishimura beat Mitsuharu Misawa and Go Shiozaki in the main event of the first "Muga World" show. The name of Fujinami's new promotion was later changed to Dradition, after the departure of Nishimura.

Fujinami returned to NJPW in 2008 where he would teamed up with Riki Choshu, and Masahiro Chono in tag team matches. On June 27, 2008, he teamed with Takao Omori in the Yuke's Cup PREMIUM One Night Tag Tournament where in the first round they defeated Kohei Sato and Shiro Koshinaka, then in the second round they lost to Jushin Liger and Manabu Nakanishi.

On August 18, 2012, Fujinami won his first title in eleven years, when he took part in Budokan Peter Pan, during which he and Mikami defeated Kudo and Makoto Oishi for the KO-D Tag Team Championship.

On March 19, 2015, it was announced that Fujinami would be inducted into the WWE Hall of Fame as part of the class of 2015. Fujinami was inducted by Ric Flair at the ceremony, which took place on March 28 in San Jose, California. On July 12, it was announced that Fujinami had signed a "Legends" deal with WWE. The contract effectively made him an ambassador for WWE, but did not restrict his Japanese bookings.

On January 4, 2020, Fujinami was a part of Jushin Thunder Liger's team for the first of Liger's retirement matches at Wrestle Kingdom 14. On January 4, 2022, he was a part of Wrestle Kingdom 16 as a surprise entrant in the New Japan Ranbo battle royal.

On January 4, 2023, Fujinami was part of an Antonio Inoki memorial 6-man tag. He teamed with Minoru Suzuki and Tiger Mask in a losing effort against Togi Makabe, Satoshi Kojima, and Yuji Nagata. It was the last match of the Wrestle Kingdom 17 pre show.

== Personal life ==
Fujinami is married to a woman named Kaori. Fujinami's son Leona made his professional wrestling debut for Dradition on November 19, 2013. He received a WWE tryout in July 2015.

== Video games ==
Fujinami appears as a gang member in the 2017 video game Yakuza Kiwami 2, alongside Riki Choshu, Masahiro Chono, Keiji Mutoh, and Genichiro Tenryu. He is a playable wrestler in WWE 2K16 as DLC and in WWE 2K17 and WWE 2K18 as unlockable content.

== Championships and accomplishments ==
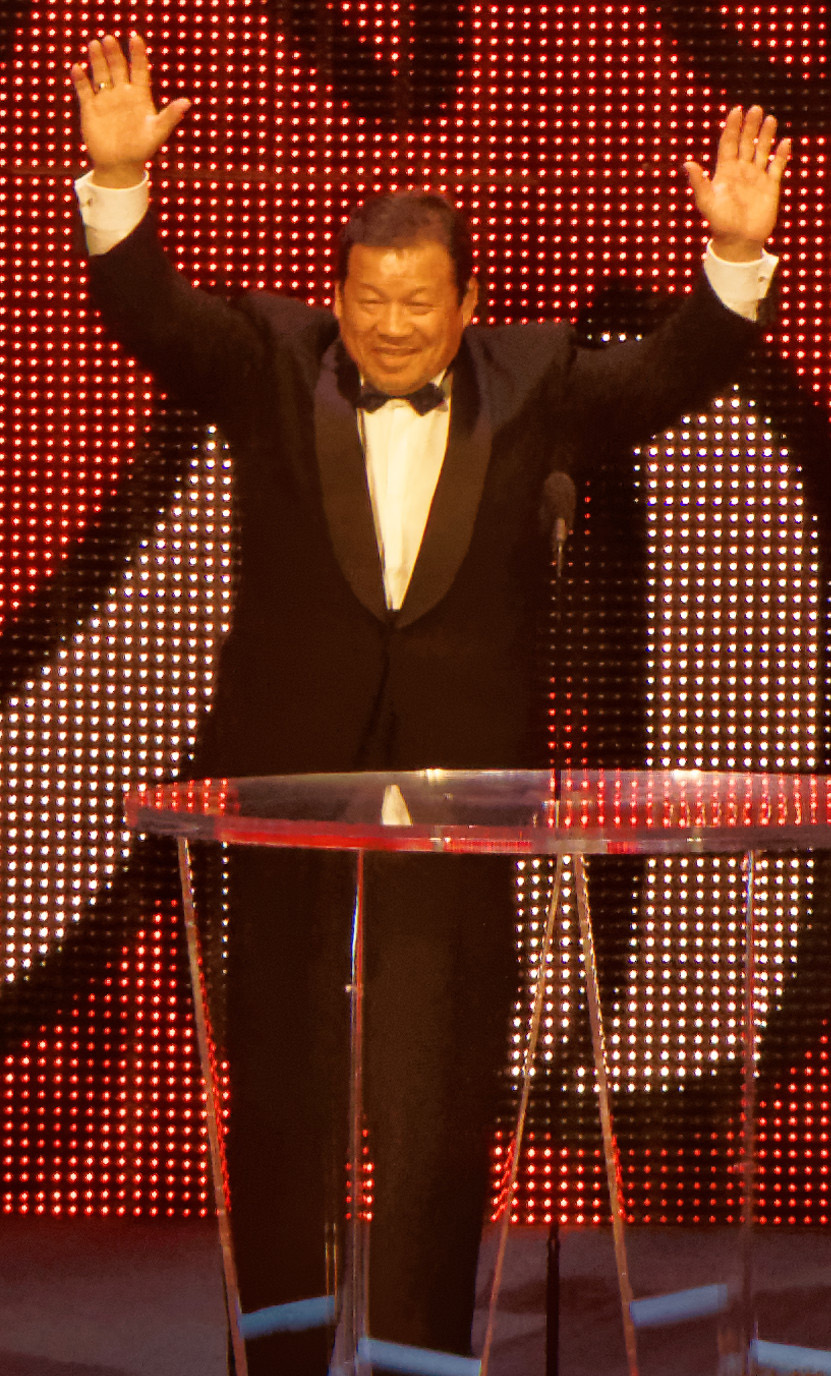
Fujinami at the 2015 WWE Hall of Fame ceremony

- Catch Wrestling Association
  - CWA Intercontinental Heavyweight Championship (1 time)
- DDT Pro-Wrestling
  - KO-D Tag Team Championship (1 time) – with Mikami
- International Professional Wrestling Hall of Fame
  - Class of 2021
- New Japan Pro-Wrestling
  - IWGP Heavyweight Championship (6 times)
  - IWGP Tag Team Championship (5 times, inaugural) – with Kengo Kimura (4) and Osamu Nishimura (1)
  - NWA International Junior Heavyweight Championship (2 times)
  - NWA World Heavyweight Championship (1 time)
  - WCWA World Heavyweight Championship (1 time)
  - WWF International Heavyweight Championship (1 time, final)
  - WWF International Tag Team Championship (1 time, final) – with Kengo Kimura
  - WWF Junior Heavyweight Championship (1 time)
  - G1 Climax (1993)
  - IWGP Tag Title League (1985) - with Kengo Kimura
  - Japan Cup Tag League (1987) - with Kengo Kimura
  - Super Grade Tag League (1991) – with Big Van Vader
  - Karl Gotch Cup (1974)
- Pacific Northwest Wrestling
  - NWA Pacific Northwest Heavyweight Championship (1 time)
- Pro Wrestling Heat Up
  - PWL World Championship (1 time)
  - Heat Up Universal Championship (1 time)
  - Heat Up Universal Tag Team Championship (1 time) - with Kazuhiro Tamura
- Pro Wrestling Illustrated
  - PWI ranked him #31 of the 500 best singles wrestlers of the "PWI Years" in 2003
  - Ranked No. 12 of the top 100 tag teams of the "PWI Years" with Antonio Inoki in 2003
- Professional Wrestling Hall of Fame
  - Class of 2017
- Tokyo Sports
  - Best Tag Team (1981) with Antonio Inoki
  - Distinguished Service Award (1978)
  - Fighting Spirit Award (1984)
  - Match of the Year Award (1983) vs. Riki Choshu on April 3
  - Match of the Year Award (1986) vs. Akira Maeda on June 12
  - MVP Award (1985)
  - Outstanding Performance Award (1980, 1982, 1987, 1988)
  - Rookie of the Year (1974)
  - Technique Award (1979)
- Universal Wrestling Association
  - UWA World Heavyweight Championship (1 time)
- World Wide Wrestling Federation / World Wrestling Federation / WWE
  - WWE Hall of Fame (Class of 2015)
  - WWF International Heavyweight Championship (2 times)
  - WWWF Junior Heavyweight Championship (2 times)
- Niigata Pro Wrestling
  - Niigata Tag Team Championship (1 time) – with Leona
- Gojappe Pro Wrestling
  - GJP Heavyweight Championship (1 time)
- Wrestling Observer Newsletter
  - Best Technical Wrestler (1985, 1986, 1988)
  - Most Outstanding Wrestler (1988)
  - Wrestling Observer Newsletter Hall of Fame (Class of 1996)
