= Tokyo Sports Puroresu Awards =

Professional wrestling awards

The Tokyo Sports Puroresu Awards (東京スポーツプロレス大賞, Tōkyō Supōtsu Puroresu Taishō) are Japanese professional wrestling, or puroresu, awards that have been handed out by the Tokyo Sports magazine annually since 1974. The most publicized awards in Japanese professional wrestling, they are recognized by all the major promotions in the country, including All Japan Pro Wrestling, New Japan Pro-Wrestling, and Pro Wrestling Noah.

The awards are voted for by a committee made up of people involved with Japanese professional wrestling, including reporters and photographers. After the winners are announced in the middle of December, an award ceremony is held in Tokyo in January. Voting takes place in rounds. In landslide cases, the winner can be determined in a single round of voting, however, if no wrestler gets enough votes, the award can be left blank and not given out that year. Most notably, the award for female wrestler of the year was not given out between 2004 and 2008 and again in 2014, when the committee felt that no wrestler had the necessary qualifications.

The awards have been described as "legit to a degree", but also to spread them among different major promotions. For example, the award for the best technical wrestler may not be given to someone considered the best technical wrestler in puroresu, but to a top wrestler from a promotion that has not gotten any of the other awards. There are currently ten active awards given out by Tokyo Sports, including one dedicated to sport wrestling.

== Active awards ==
=== MVP Award ===
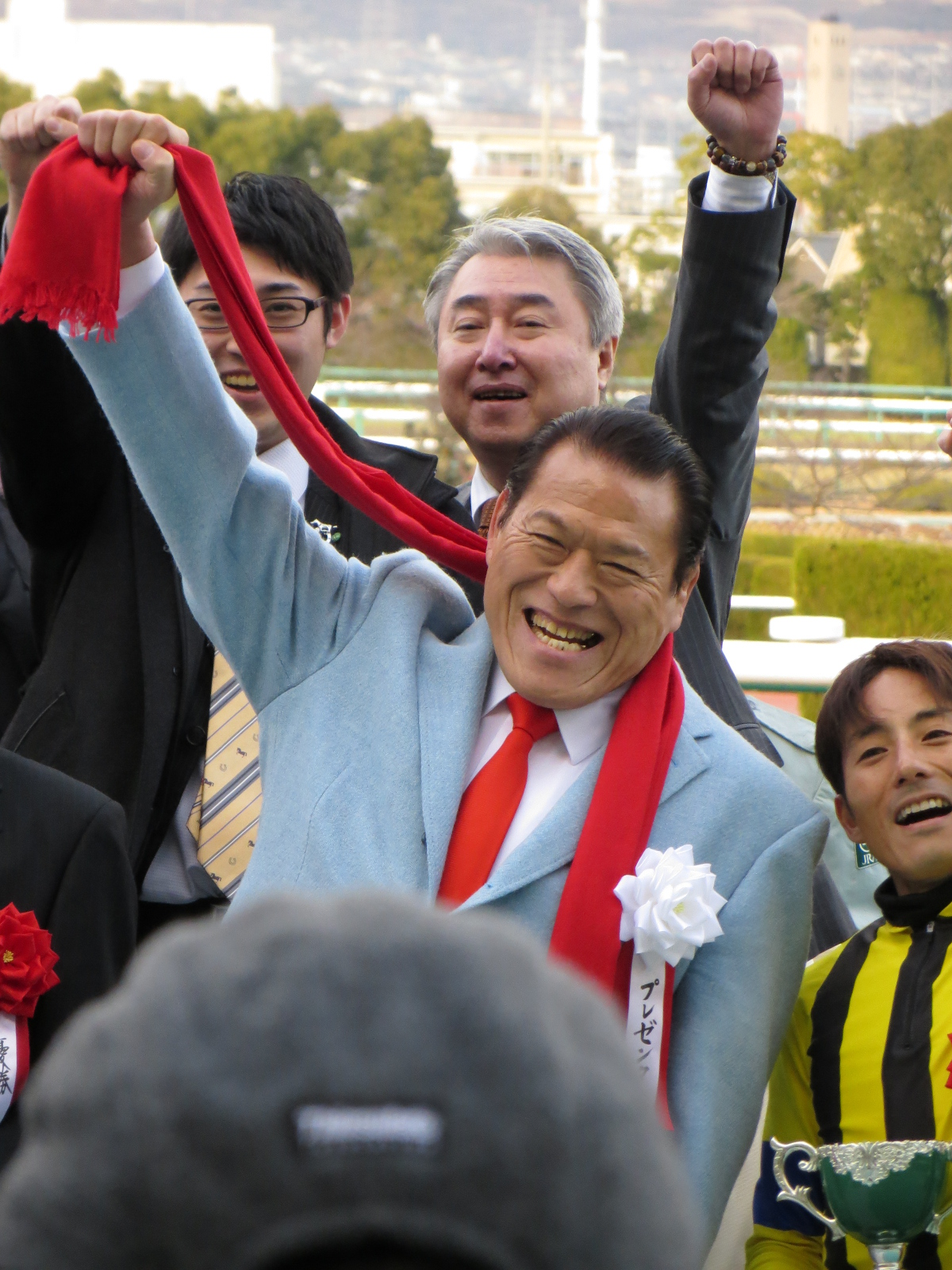
Antonio Inoki is a record six-time winner of the category

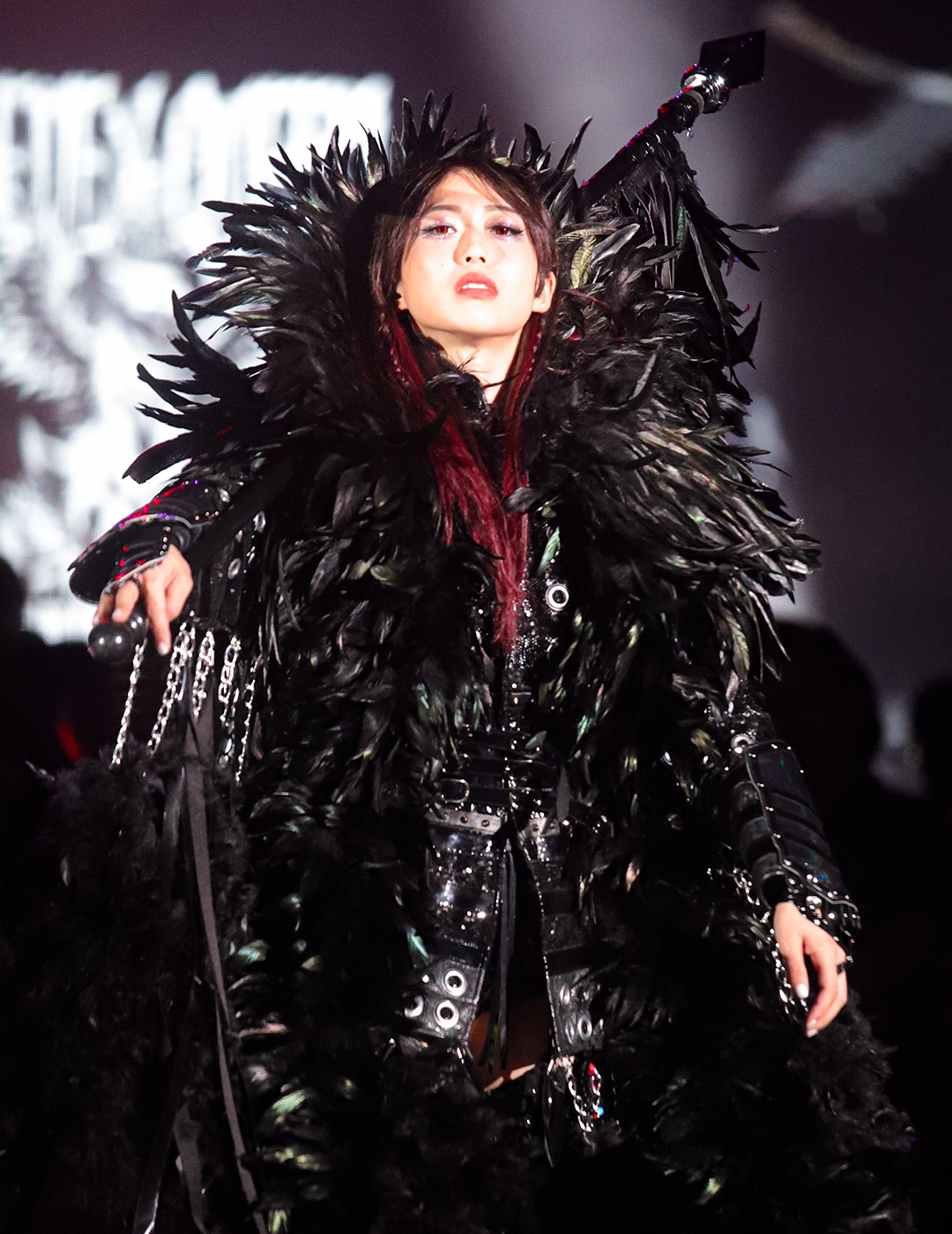
Saya Kamitani is the most recent, and first female, winner of the category

Rebranded in 2010. Originally known as Best Wrestler Award (最優秀選手賞, Saiyūshū senshu-shō), which has since become a secondary name.

Year	Winner	Promotion
1974	Antonio Inoki	New Japan Pro-Wrestling
1975	Giant Baba	All Japan Pro Wrestling
1976	Antonio Inoki	New Japan Pro-Wrestling
1977	Antonio Inoki	New Japan Pro-Wrestling
1978	Antonio Inoki	New Japan Pro-Wrestling
1979	Giant Baba	All Japan Pro Wrestling
1980	Antonio Inoki	New Japan Pro-Wrestling
1981	Antonio Inoki	New Japan Pro-Wrestling
1982	Tiger Mask	New Japan Pro-Wrestling
1983	Jumbo Tsuruta	All Japan Pro Wrestling
1984	Jumbo Tsuruta	All Japan Pro Wrestling
1985	Tatsumi Fujinami	New Japan Pro-Wrestling
1986	Genichiro Tenryu	All Japan Pro Wrestling
1987	Genichiro Tenryu	All Japan Pro Wrestling
1988	Genichiro Tenryu	All Japan Pro Wrestling
1989	Akira Maeda	Universal Wrestling Federation
1990	Atsushi Onita	Frontier Martial-Arts Wrestling
1991	Jumbo Tsuruta	All Japan Pro Wrestling
1992	Nobuhiko Takada	Union of Wrestling Forces International
1993	Genichiro Tenryu	Wrestle Association R
1994	Shinya Hashimoto	New Japan Pro-Wrestling
1995	Keiji Muto	New Japan Pro-Wrestling
1996	Kenta Kobashi	All Japan Pro Wrestling
1997	Masahiro Chono	New Japan Pro-Wrestling
1998	Kenta Kobashi	All Japan Pro Wrestling
1999	Keiji Muto	New Japan Pro-Wrestling
2000	Kazushi Sakuraba	Pride Fighting Championships
2001	Keiji Muto	New Japan Pro-Wrestling
2002	Bob Sapp	K-1; New Japan Pro-Wrestling
2003	Yoshihiro Takayama	Pro Wrestling Noah
2004	Kensuke Sasaki	All Japan Pro Wrestling; New Japan Pro-Wrestling
2005	Satoshi Kojima	All Japan Pro Wrestling
2006	Minoru Suzuki	Pancrase
2007	Mitsuharu Misawa	Pro Wrestling Noah
2008	Keiji Muto	All Japan Pro Wrestling
2009	Hiroshi Tanahashi	New Japan Pro-Wrestling
2010	Takashi Sugiura	Pro Wrestling Noah
2011	Hiroshi Tanahashi	New Japan Pro-Wrestling
2012	Kazuchika Okada	New Japan Pro-Wrestling
2013	Kazuchika Okada	New Japan Pro-Wrestling
2014	Hiroshi Tanahashi	New Japan Pro-Wrestling
2015	Kazuchika Okada	New Japan Pro-Wrestling
2016	Tetsuya Naito	New Japan Pro-Wrestling
2017	Tetsuya Naito	New Japan Pro-Wrestling
2018	Hiroshi Tanahashi	New Japan Pro-Wrestling
2019	Kazuchika Okada	New Japan Pro-Wrestling
2020	Tetsuya Naito	New Japan Pro-Wrestling
2021	Shingo Takagi	New Japan Pro-Wrestling
2022	Kazuchika Okada	New Japan Pro-Wrestling
2023	Tetsuya Naito	New Japan Pro-Wrestling
2024	Zack Sabre Jr.	New Japan Pro-Wrestling
2025	Saya Kamitani	World Wonder Ring Stardom

=== Best Bout Award (ベストバウト, Besutobauto) ===
Rebranded in 2010. Originally known as Match of the Year Award (年間最高試合賞, Nenkan saikō shiai-shō), which has since become a secondary name.

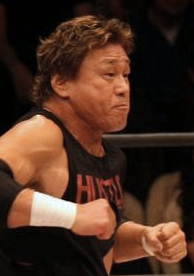
Tied for most in the category is Genichiro Tenryu, who won in three separate decades & five different promotions ...

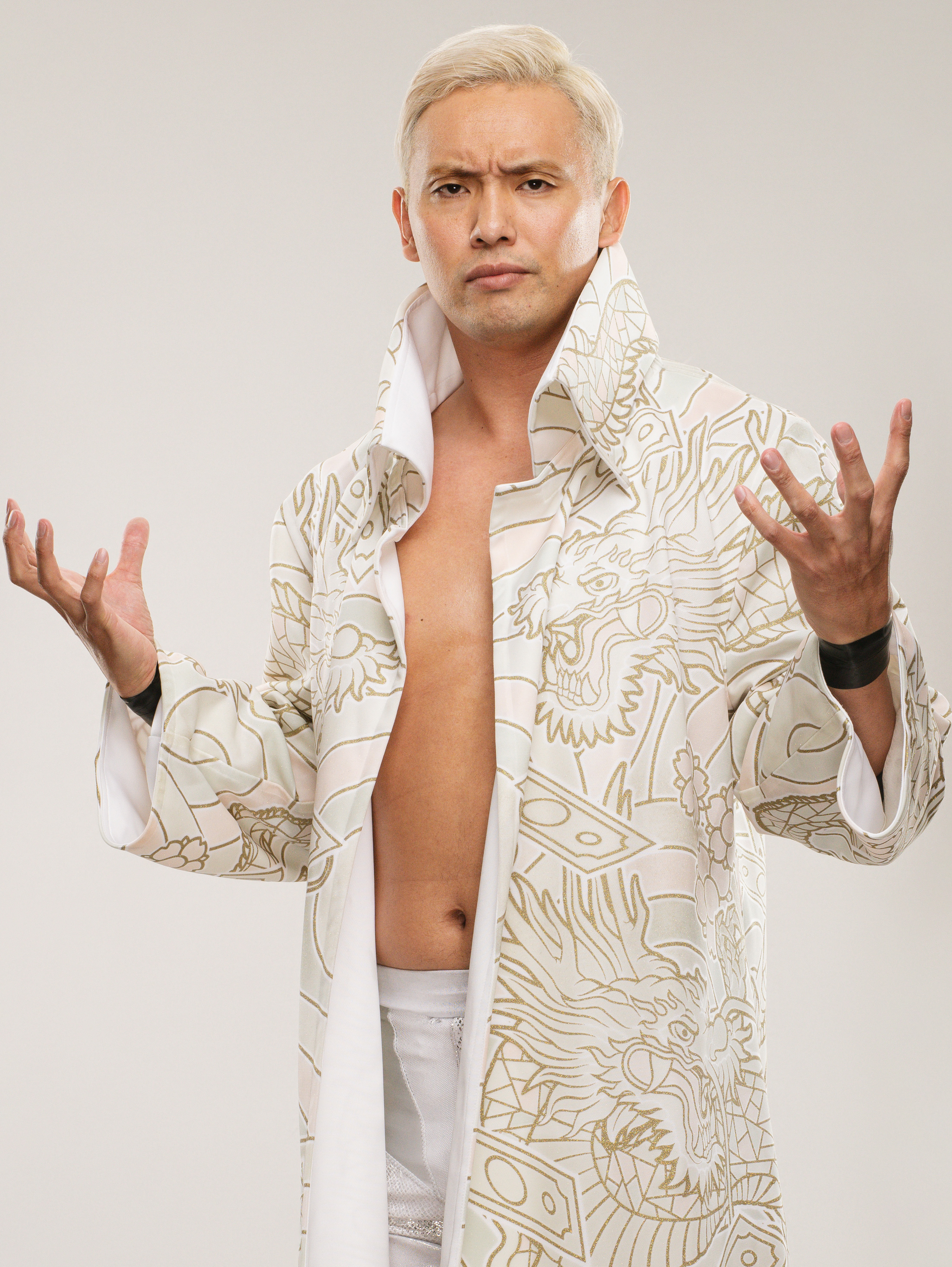
... and Kazuchika Okada, who won most of the category's awards in the 2010s for New Japan Pro-Wrestling.

Year	Winner	Promotion
1974	Antonio Inoki vs. Strong Kobayashi (March 19)	New Japan Pro-Wrestling
1975	Antonio Inoki vs. Billy Robinson (December 11)	New Japan Pro-Wrestling
1976	Jumbo Tsuruta vs. Rusher Kimura (March 28)	International Wrestling Enterprise; All Japan Pro Wrestling
1977	Jumbo Tsuruta vs. Mil Máscaras (August 25)	All Japan Pro Wrestling
1978	Harley Race vs. Jumbo Tsuruta (January 20)	All Japan Pro Wrestling
1979	B-I Cannon (Antonio Inoki & Giant Baba) vs. Abdullah the Butcher & Tiger Jeet Singh (August 26)	Tokyo Sports
1980	Dory Funk Jr. & Terry Funk vs. Giant Baba & Jumbo Tsuruta (December 11)	All Japan Pro Wrestling
1981	Giant Baba vs. Verne Gagne (January 18)	All Japan Pro Wrestling
1982	Giant Baba vs. Stan Hansen (February 4)	All Japan Pro Wrestling
1983	Riki Choshu vs. Tatsumi Fujinami (April 3)	New Japan Pro-Wrestling
1984	Antonio Inoki vs. Riki Choshu (August 2)	New Japan Pro-Wrestling
1985	Jumbo Tsuruta vs. Riki Choshu (November 4)	All Japan Pro Wrestling
1986	Akira Maeda vs. Tatsumi Fujinami (June 12)	New Japan Pro-Wrestling
1987	Genichiro Tenryu vs. Jumbo Tsuruta (August 31)	All Japan Pro Wrestling
1988	Genichiro Tenryu vs. Stan Hansen (July 27)	All Japan Pro Wrestling
1989	Genichiro Tenryu vs. Jumbo Tsuruta (June 5)	All Japan Pro Wrestling
1990	Atsushi Onita vs. Tarzan Goto (August 4)	Frontier Martial-Arts Wrestling
1991	Genichiro Tenryu vs. Hulk Hogan (December 12)	Super World of Sports
1992	Stan Hansen vs. Toshiaki Kawada (June 5)	All Japan Pro Wrestling
1993	Genichiro Tenryu vs. Riki Choshu (January 4)	New Japan Pro-Wrestling
1994	Revolution (Ashura Hara & Genichiro Tenryu) vs. Atsushi Onita & Tarzan Goto (March 2)	Wrestle Association R
1995	Akira Taue & Toshiaki Kawada vs. Kenta Kobashi & Mitsuharu Misawa (June 9)	All Japan Pro Wrestling
1996	Genichiro Tenryu vs. Nobuhiko Takada (September 11)	Wrestle Association R
1997	Kenta Kobashi vs. Mitsuharu Misawa (October 21)	All Japan Pro Wrestling
1998	Kenta Kobashi vs. Mitsuharu Misawa (October 31)	All Japan Pro Wrestling
1999	Genichiro Tenryu vs. Keiji Muto (May 3)	New Japan Pro-Wrestling
2000	Kensuke Sasaki vs. Toshiaki Kawada (October 9)	New Japan Pro-Wrestling
2001	Kazuyuki Fujita vs. Yuji Nagata (June 6)	New Japan Pro-Wrestling
2002	Yoshihiro Takayama vs. Yuji Nagata (May 2)	New Japan Pro-Wrestling
2003	Kenta Kobashi vs. Mitsuharu Misawa (March 1)	Pro Wrestling Noah
2004	Jun Akiyama vs. Kenta Kobashi (July 10)	Pro Wrestling Noah
2005	Kensuke Sasaki vs. Kenta Kobashi (July 18)	Pro Wrestling Noah
2006	Kenta vs. Naomichi Marufuji (October 29)	Pro Wrestling Noah
2007	Jun Akiyama & Mitsuharu Misawa vs. Kenta Kobashi & Yoshihiro Takayama (December 2)	Pro Wrestling Noah
2008	Naomichi Marufuji vs. Shuji Kondo (November 3)	All Japan Pro Wrestling
2009	Jun Kasai vs. Ryuji Ito (November 20)	Big Japan Pro Wrestling
2010	Kenny Omega & Kota Ibushi vs. Prince Devitt & Ryusuke Taguchi (October 11)	New Japan Pro-Wrestling
2011	Keiji Muto & Kenta Kobashi vs. Takashi Iizuka & Toru Yano (August 27)	All Japan Pro Wrestling; New Japan Pro-Wrestling; Pro Wrestling Noah
2012	Hiroshi Tanahashi vs. Kazuchika Okada (June 16)	New Japan Pro-Wrestling
2013	Kota Ibushi vs. Shinsuke Nakamura (August 4)	New Japan Pro-Wrestling
2014	Kazuchika Okada vs. Shinsuke Nakamura (August 10)	New Japan Pro-Wrestling
2015	Genichiro Tenryu vs. Kazuchika Okada (November 15)	Tenryu Project
2016	Kazuchika Okada vs. Naomichi Marufuji (July 18)	New Japan Pro-Wrestling
2017	Kazuchika Okada vs. Kenny Omega (January 4)	New Japan Pro-Wrestling
2018	Kazuchika Okada vs. Kenny Omega (June 9)	New Japan Pro-Wrestling
2019	Kazuchika Okada vs. Sanada (October 14)	New Japan Pro-Wrestling
2020	Kazuchika Okada vs. Tetsuya Naito (January 5)	New Japan Pro-Wrestling
2021	Go Shiozaki vs. Keiji Muto (February 12)	Pro Wrestling Noah
2022	Kazuchika Okada vs. Will Ospreay (August 18)	New Japan Pro-Wrestling
2023	The Great Muta vs. Shinsuke Nakamura (January 1)	Pro Wrestling Noah
2024	Hirooki Goto vs. Yota Tsuji (March 20)	New Japan Pro-Wrestling
2025	Kaito Kiyomiya vs. Ozawa (January 1)	Pro Wrestling Noah

=== Outstanding Performance Award (殊勲賞, Shukun-shō) ===
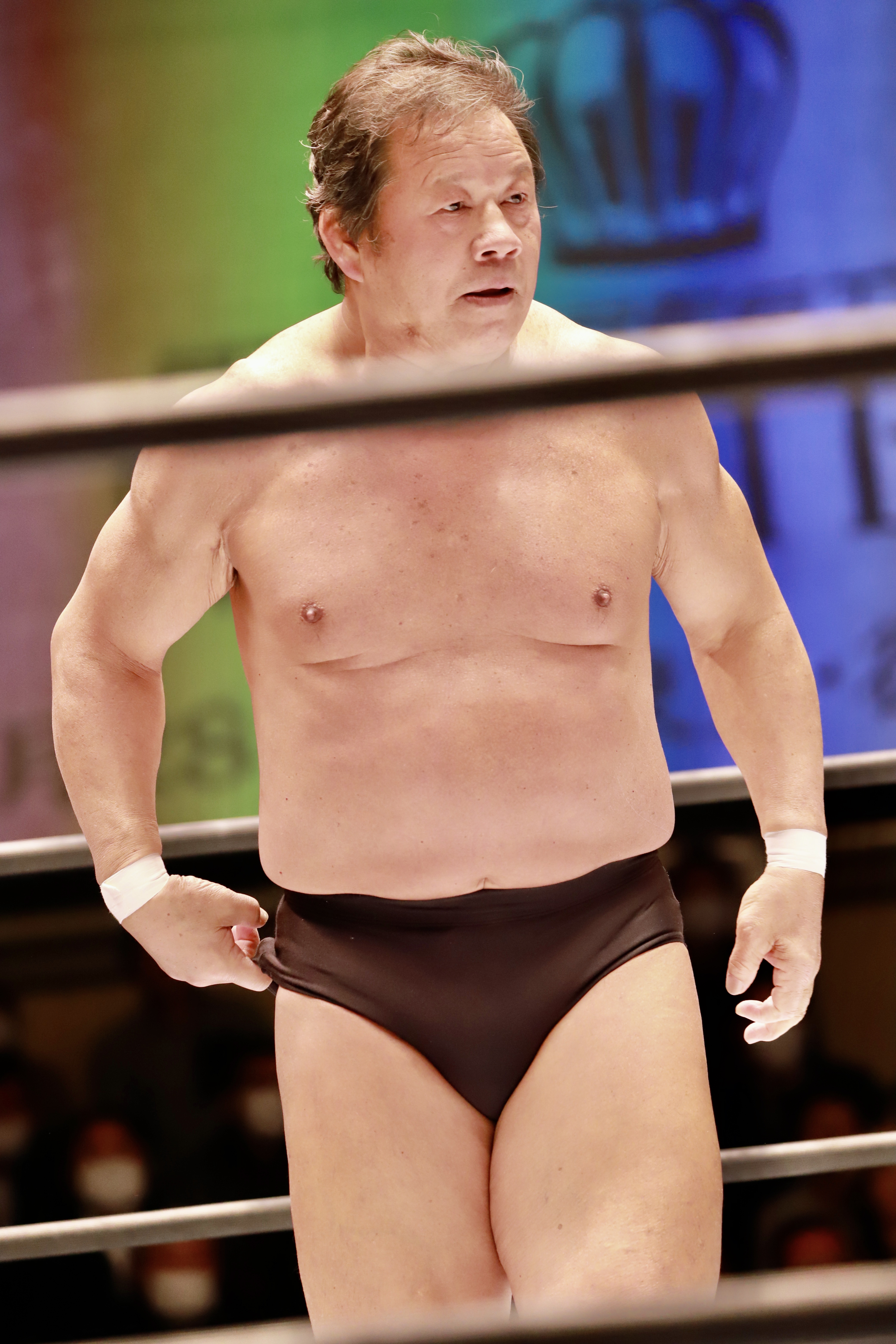
Tatsumi Fujinami is a four-time winner of the category (all in the 1980s)

Year	Winner	Promotion
1975	Rusher Kimura	International Wrestling Enterprise
1976	Seiji Sakaguchi	New Japan Pro-Wrestling
1977	Animal Hamaguchi; Mighty Inoue	International Wrestling Enterprise
1978	Rusher Kimura	International Wrestling Enterprise
1979	Ashura Hara	International Wrestling Enterprise
1980	Tatsumi Fujinami	New Japan Pro-Wrestling
1981	Genichiro Tenryu	All Japan Pro Wrestling
1982	Tatsumi Fujinami	New Japan Pro-Wrestling
1983	The Great Kabuki	All Japan Pro Wrestling
1984	Genichiro Tenryu	All Japan Pro Wrestling
1985	Kengo Kimura	New Japan Pro-Wrestling
1986	Yoshiaki Yatsu	Japan Pro-Wrestling
1987	Kengo Kimura; Tatsumi Fujinami	New Japan Pro-Wrestling
1988	Tatsumi Fujinami	New Japan Pro-Wrestling
1989	Shinya Hashimoto	New Japan Pro-Wrestling
1990	Mitsuharu Misawa	All Japan Pro Wrestling
1991	Atsushi Onita	Frontier Martial-Arts Wrestling
1992	Masahiro Chono	New Japan Pro-Wrestling
1993	Kenta Kobashi	All Japan Pro Wrestling
1994	Jushin Thunder Liger	New Japan Pro-Wrestling
1995	Akira Taue	All Japan Pro Wrestling
1996	Genichiro Tenryu	Wrestle Association R
1997	Mitsuharu Misawa	All Japan Pro Wrestling
1998	Keiji Muto; Kodo Fuyuki	New Japan Pro-Wrestling; Frontier Martial-Arts Wrestling
1999	Kazushi Sakuraba	Pride Fighting Championships
2000	Jun Akiyama	All Japan Pro Wrestling; Pro Wrestling Noah
2001	Jun Akiyama	Pro Wrestling Noah
2002	Yoshihiro Takayama	Pro Wrestling Noah
2003	Kenta Kobashi	Pro Wrestling Noah
2004	Toshiaki Kawada	All Japan Pro Wrestling
2005	Takeshi Rikio	Pro Wrestling Noah
2006	Naomichi Marufuji	Pro Wrestling Noah
2007	Hiroshi Tanahashi	New Japan Pro-Wrestling
2008	Kensuke Sasaki	Kensuke Office
2009	Takashi Sugiura	Pro Wrestling Noah
2010	Suwama	All Japan Pro Wrestling
2011	Jun Akiyama	Pro Wrestling Noah
2012	Takeshi Morishima	Pro Wrestling Noah
2013	Kenta	Pro Wrestling Noah
2014	Tomohiro Ishii	New Japan Pro-Wrestling
2015	Minoru Suzuki	Pancrase
2016	Kento Miyahara	All Japan Pro Wrestling
2017	Yamato	Dragon Gate
2018	Naomichi Marufuji	Pro Wrestling Noah
2019	Kento Miyahara	All Japan Pro Wrestling
2020	Go Shiozaki	Pro Wrestling Noah
2021	Jake Lee	All Japan Pro Wrestling
2022	Kento Miyahara	All Japan Pro Wrestling
2023	Hiromu Takahashi	New Japan Pro-Wrestling
2024	Yuma Anzai	All Japan Pro Wrestling
2025	Konosuke Takeshita	All Elite Wrestling; DDT Pro-Wrestling; New Japan Pro-Wrestling

=== Fighting Spirit Award (敢闘賞, Kantō-shō) ===
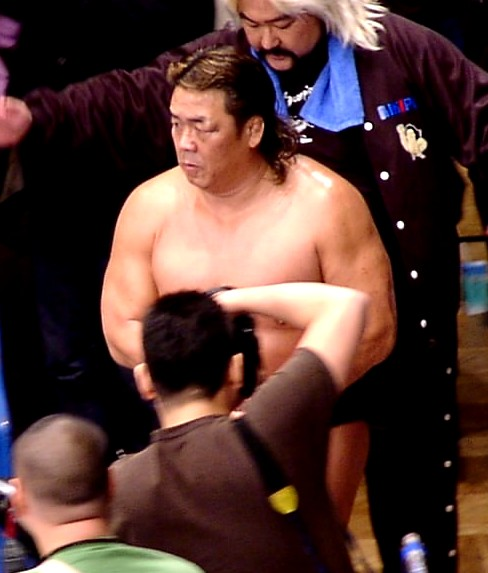
Riki Choshu is a record four-time winner of the category ...

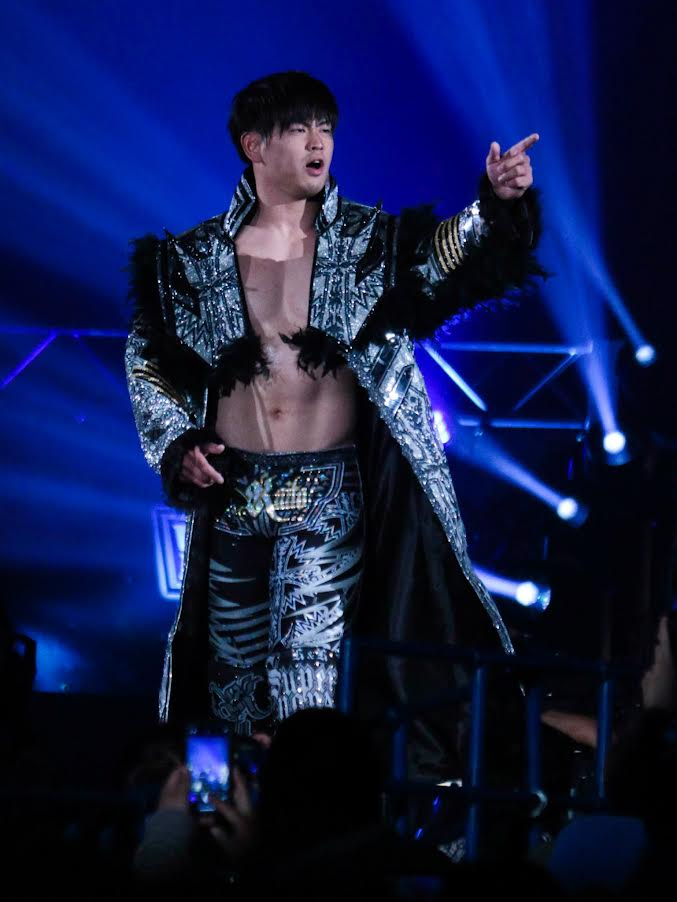
... whilst Kaito Kiyomiya is tied running-up (with Rusher Kimura), and has the most of a 21st century wrestler, with three.

Year	Winner	Promotion
1974	Strong Kobayashi	New Japan Pro-Wrestling
1975	Kintarō Ōki	All Japan Pro Wrestling
1976	Rusher Kimura	International Wrestling Enterprise
1977	Seiji Sakaguchi	New Japan Pro-Wrestling
1978	Kim Duk	All Japan Pro Wrestling
1979	Riki Choshu	New Japan Pro-Wrestling
1980	Animal Hamaguchi	International Wrestling Enterprise
1981	Rusher Kimura	International Wrestling Enterprise
1982	Rusher Kimura	International Wrestling Enterprise
1983	Genichiro Tenryu	All Japan Pro Wrestling
1984	Tatsumi Fujinami	New Japan Pro-Wrestling
1985	Tiger Mask (II)	All Japan Pro Wrestling
1986	Riki Choshu	Japan Pro-Wrestling
1987	Yoshiaki Fujiwara	New Japan Pro-Wrestling
1988	Riki Choshu	New Japan Pro-Wrestling
1989	Riki Choshu	New Japan Pro-Wrestling
1990	Masakatsu Funaki	Universal Wrestling Federation
1991	Masahiro Chono	New Japan Pro-Wrestling
1992	Akira Taue	All Japan Pro Wrestling
1993	Shinya Hashimoto	New Japan Pro-Wrestling
1994	Toshiaki Kawada	All Japan Pro Wrestling
1995	Kodo Fuyuki	Wrestle Association R
1996	Akira Taue	All Japan Pro Wrestling
1997	Hayabusa	Frontier Martial-Arts Wrestling
1998	Jun Akiyama	All Japan Pro Wrestling
1999	Manabu Nakanishi; Naoya Ogawa	New Japan Pro-Wrestling; Universal Fighting Arts Organization
2000	Toshiaki Kawada	All Japan Pro Wrestling
2001	Yuji Nagata	New Japan Pro-Wrestling
2002	Masahiro Chono	New Japan Pro-Wrestling
2003	Hiroshi Tanahashi	New Japan Pro-Wrestling
2004	Hiroyoshi Tenzan	New Japan Pro-Wrestling
2005	Katsuhiko Nakajima	All Japan Pro Wrestling
2006	Hiroshi Tanahashi	New Japan Pro-Wrestling
2007	Takeshi Morishima	Pro Wrestling Noah
2008	Masato Tanaka	Pro Wrestling Zero1
2009	Togi Makabe	New Japan Pro-Wrestling
2010	Satoshi Kojima	New Japan Pro-Wrestling
2011	Masaaki Mochizuki; Yuji Nagata	Dragon Gate; New Japan Pro-Wrestling
2012	Abdullah Kobayashi	Big Japan Pro Wrestling
2013	Daisuke Sekimoto	Big Japan Pro Wrestling
2014	Atsushi Onita	Chō Hanabi Puroresu
2015	Yuji Okabayashi	Big Japan Pro Wrestling
2016	Katsuhiko Nakajima	Pro Wrestling Noah
2017	Katsuyori Shibata	New Japan Pro-Wrestling
2018	Kaito Kiyomiya	Pro Wrestling Noah
2019	Kaito Kiyomiya	Pro Wrestling Noah
2020	Hiromu Takahashi	New Japan Pro-Wrestling
2021	Konosuke Takeshita	DDT Pro-Wrestling
2022	Great-O-Khan	New Japan Pro-Wrestling
2023	Kenoh	Pro Wrestling Noah
2024	Kaito Kiyomiya	Pro Wrestling Noah
2025	Sareee	Sareee-ism

=== Technique Award (技能賞, Ginō-shō) ===
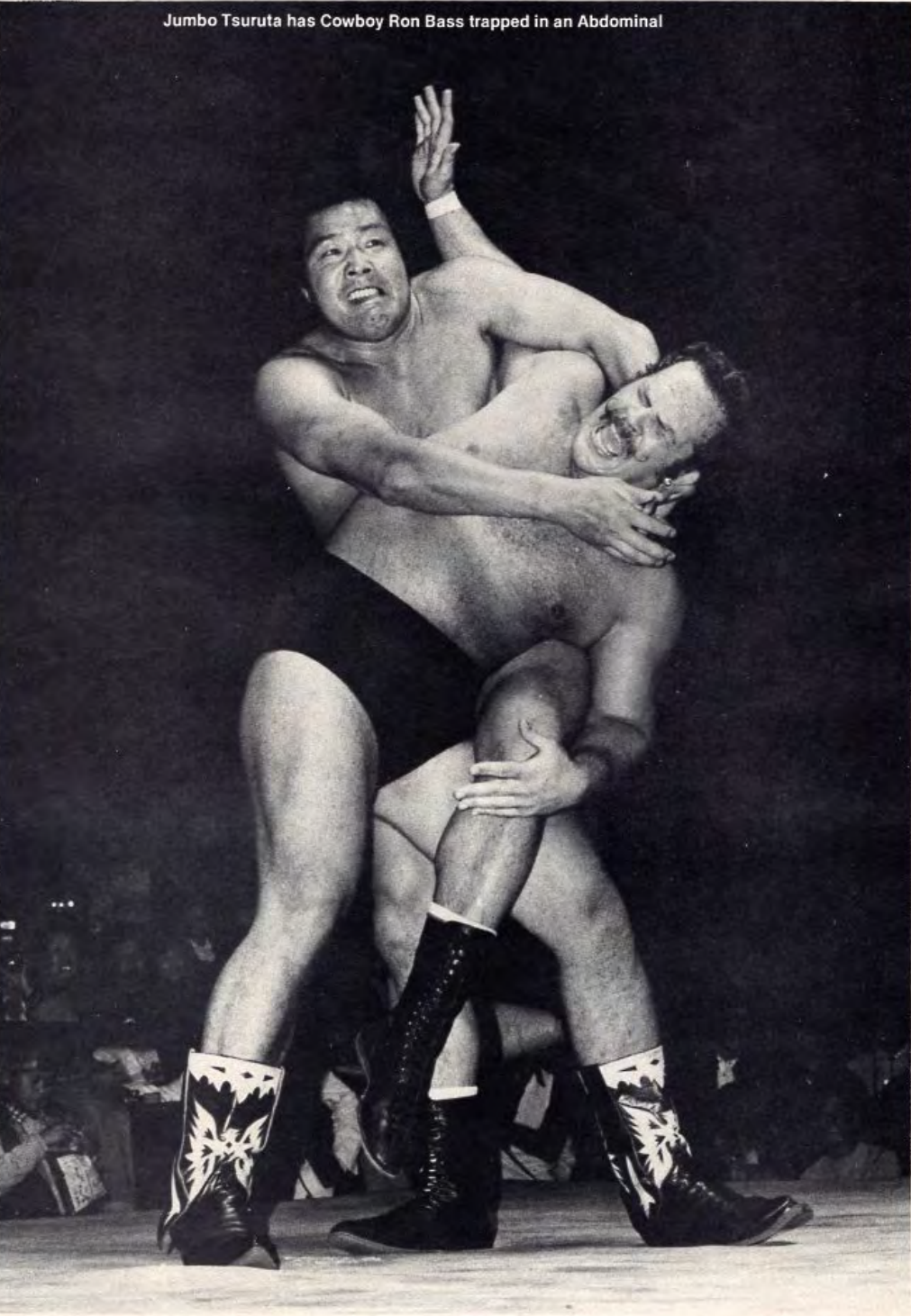
Jumbo Tsuruta (pictured facing Ron Bass) was a record four-time winner of the category ...

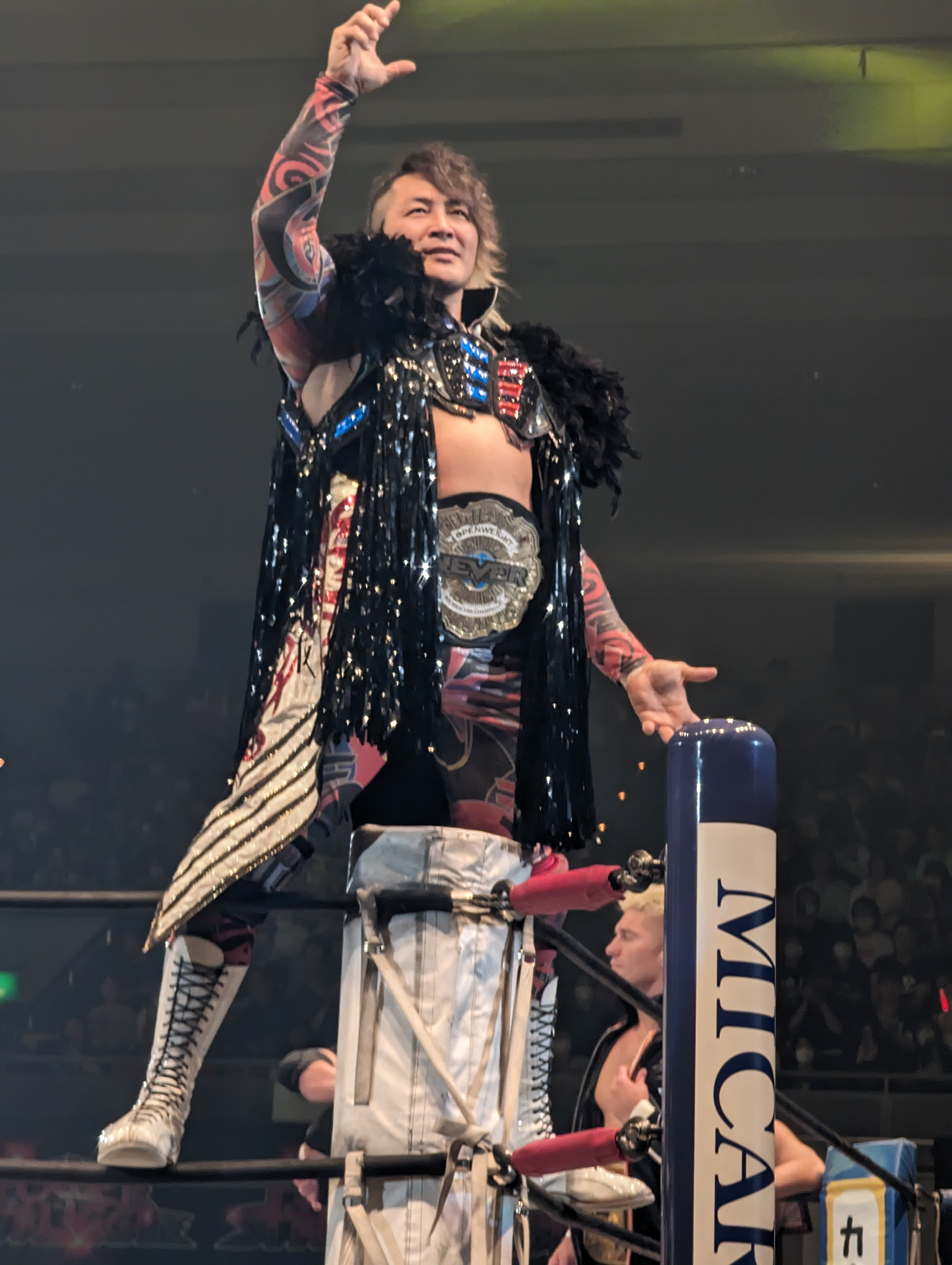
... and the most recent winner was Hiroshi Tanahashi during his final calendar year of competition.

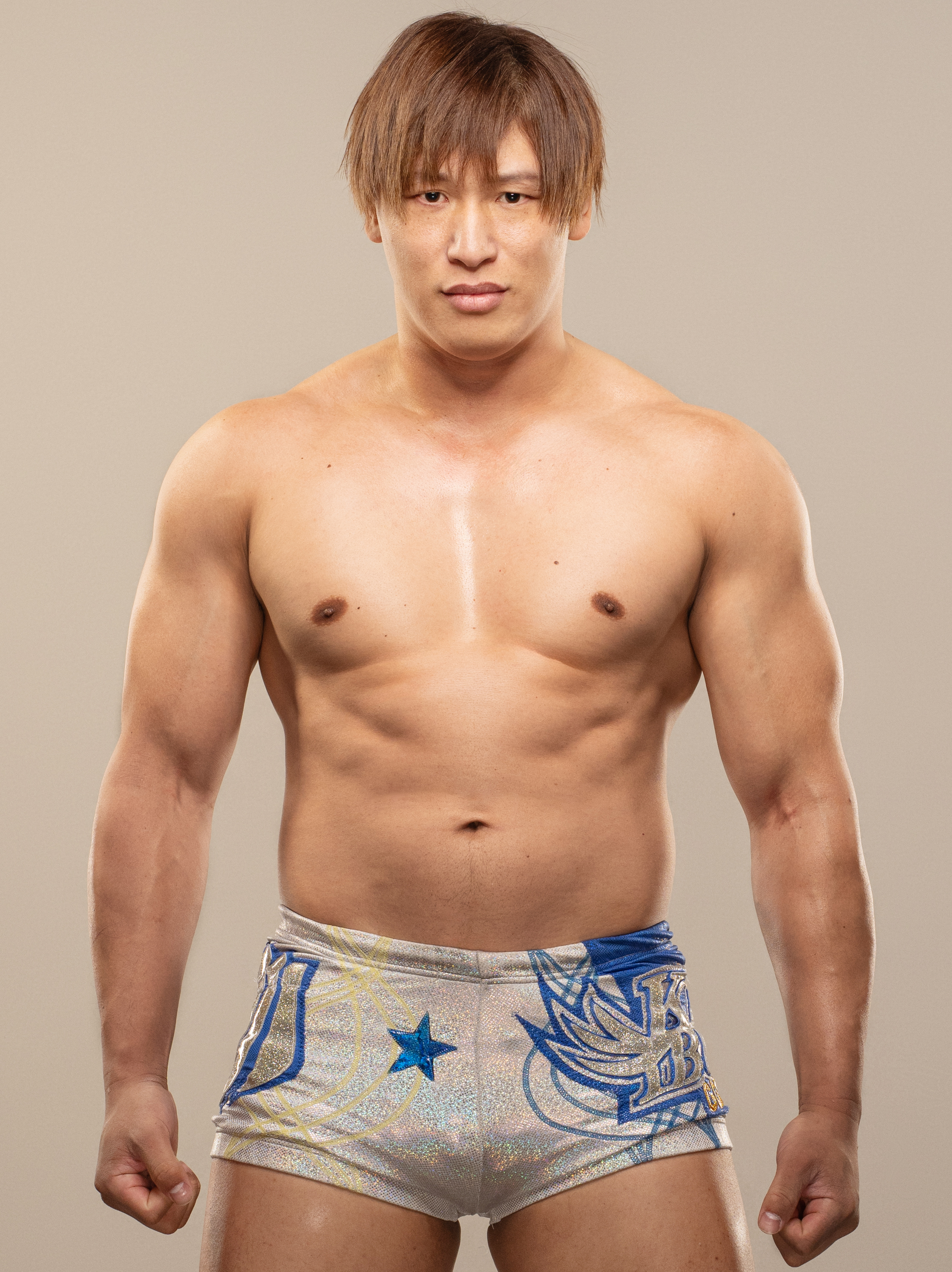
The most recent multi-time winner of the award was Kota Ibushi, who won it in 2009 as a member of DDT, and 2019 as a member of NJPW.

Year	Winner	Promotion
1974	Jumbo Tsuruta	All Japan Pro Wrestling
1975	Mighty Inoue	International Wrestling Enterprise
1976	Isamu Teranishi	International Wrestling Enterprise
1977	Kantaro Hoshino	New Japan Pro-Wrestling
1979	Tatsumi Fujinami	New Japan Pro-Wrestling
1980	Kengo Kimura	New Japan Pro-Wrestling
1981	Ashura Hara; Riki Choshu	International Wrestling Enterprise; New Japan Pro-Wrestling
1982	Tiger Mask	New Japan Pro-Wrestling
1983	Akira Maeda	New Japan Pro-Wrestling
1984	Super Tiger	Universal Wrestling Federation
1985	Antonio Inoki	New Japan Pro-Wrestling
1986	Jumbo Tsuruta	All Japan Pro Wrestling
1988	Jumbo Tsuruta	All Japan Pro Wrestling
1989	Yoshiaki Fujiwara	Universal Wrestling Federation
1990	Genichiro Tenryu	Super World of Sports
1991	Hiroshi Hase	New Japan Pro-Wrestling
1992	Último Dragón	Super World of Sports; Wrestle Association R
1993	Masakatsu Funaki	Pancrase
1994	Kenta Kobashi	All Japan Pro Wrestling
1995	Yoji Anjo	UWF International
1996	Yoshinari Ogawa	All Japan Pro Wrestling
1997	Yuki Kondo	Pancrase
1998	Yuji Nagata	New Japan Pro-Wrestling
1999	Yuji Nagata	New Japan Pro-Wrestling
2000	Takashi Iizuka	New Japan Pro-Wrestling
2001	Sanae Kikuta	Pancrase
2002	Satoshi Kojima	All Japan Pro Wrestling
2003	Jun Akiyama	Pro Wrestling Noah
2004	Minoru Suzuki	Pancrase
2005	Taka Michinoku	Kaientai Dojo
2006	Cima	Dragon Gate
2007	Daisuke Sekimoto	Big Japan Pro Wrestling
2008	Shingo Takagi	Dragon Gate
2009	Kota Ibushi	DDT Pro-Wrestling
2010	Kaz Hayashi	All Japan Pro Wrestling
2011	Kenta	Pro Wrestling Noah
2012	Shinsuke Nakamura	New Japan Pro-Wrestling
2013	Masato Yoshino	Dragon Gate
2014	B×B Hulk	Dragon Gate
2015	Tomoaki Honma	New Japan Pro-Wrestling
2016	Kenny Omega	New Japan Pro-Wrestling
2017	Hideki Suzuki	Big Japan Pro Wrestling; Pro Wrestling Zero1
2018	Tetsuya Naito	New Japan Pro-Wrestling
2019	Kota Ibushi	Ibushi Pro Wrestling Research Institute; New Japan Pro-Wrestling
2020	Tetsuya Endo	DDT Pro-Wrestling
2021	Great-O-Khan	New Japan Pro-Wrestling
2022	El Lindaman	Gleat
2023	Yuma Aoyagi	All Japan Pro Wrestling
2024	Shinya Aoki	Paraestra
2025	Hiroshi Tanahashi	New Japan Pro-Wrestling

=== Best Tag Team Award (最優秀タッグチーム賞, Saiyūshū taggu chīmu-shō) ===
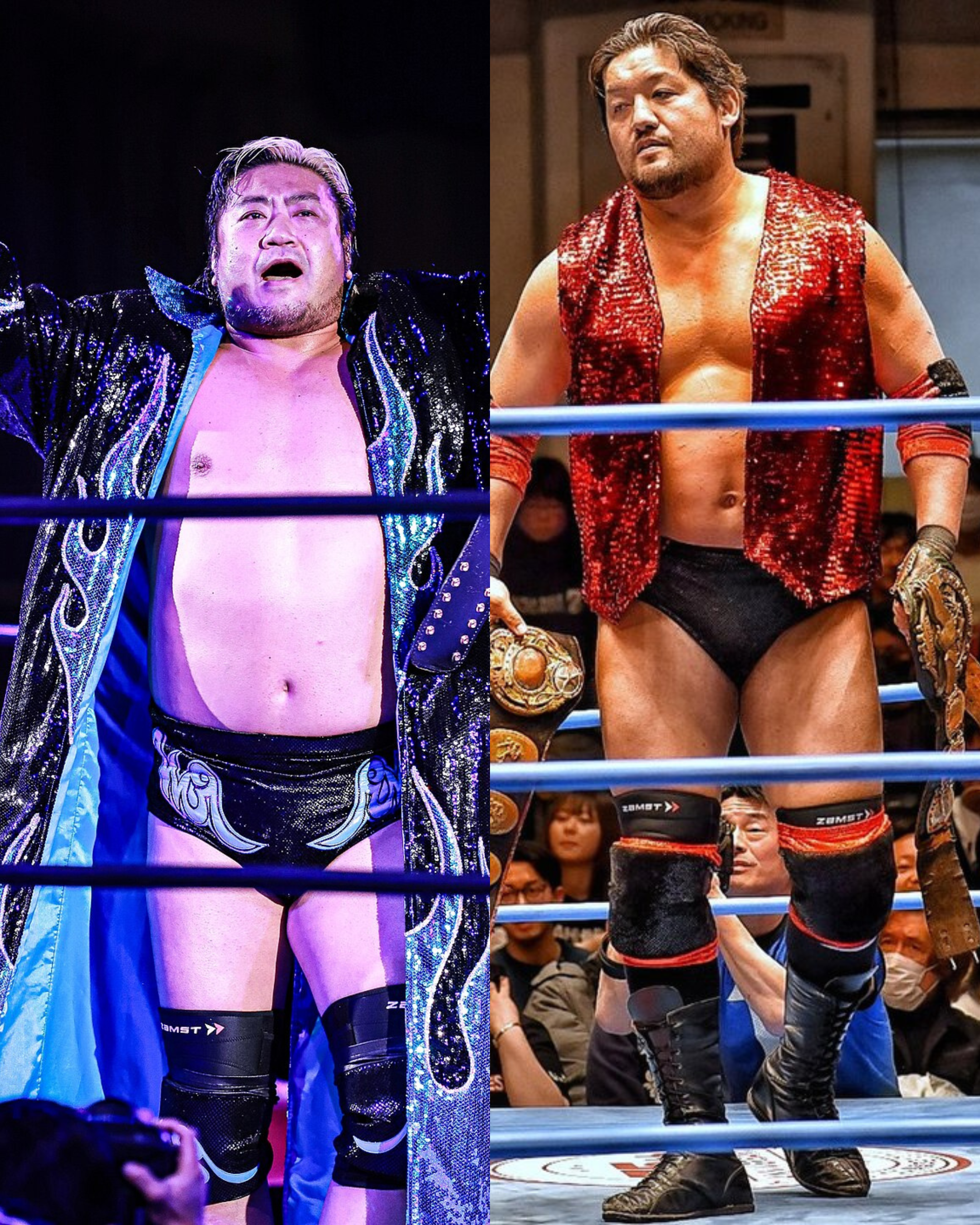
The Violent Giants (Suwama and Shuji Ishikawa) are the winniest consecutive tag team in the category, winning the award between 2017 and 2019.

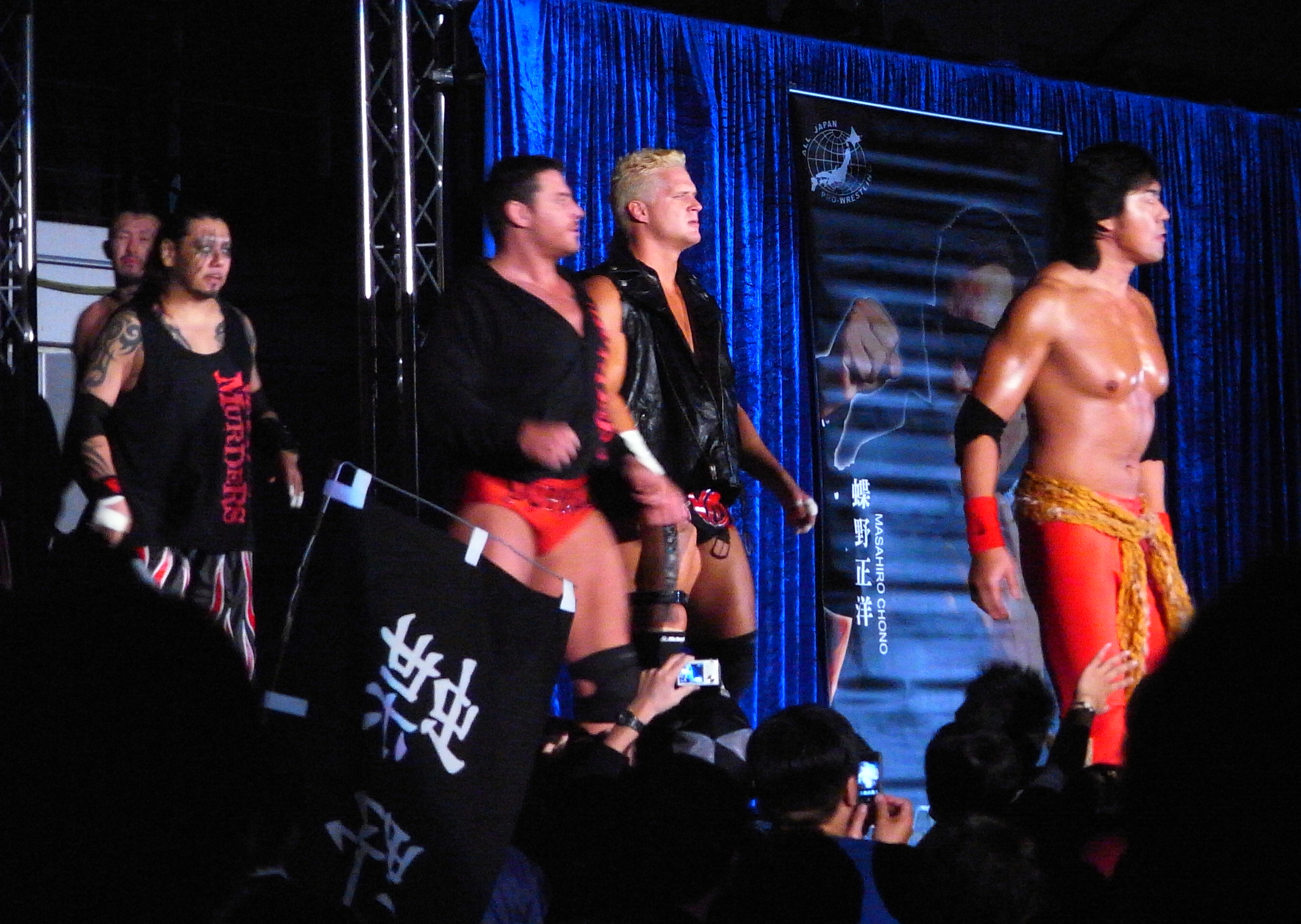
nWo Japan, Heisei Ishingun and Voodoo Murders (pictured) have won the award with more than two members listed.

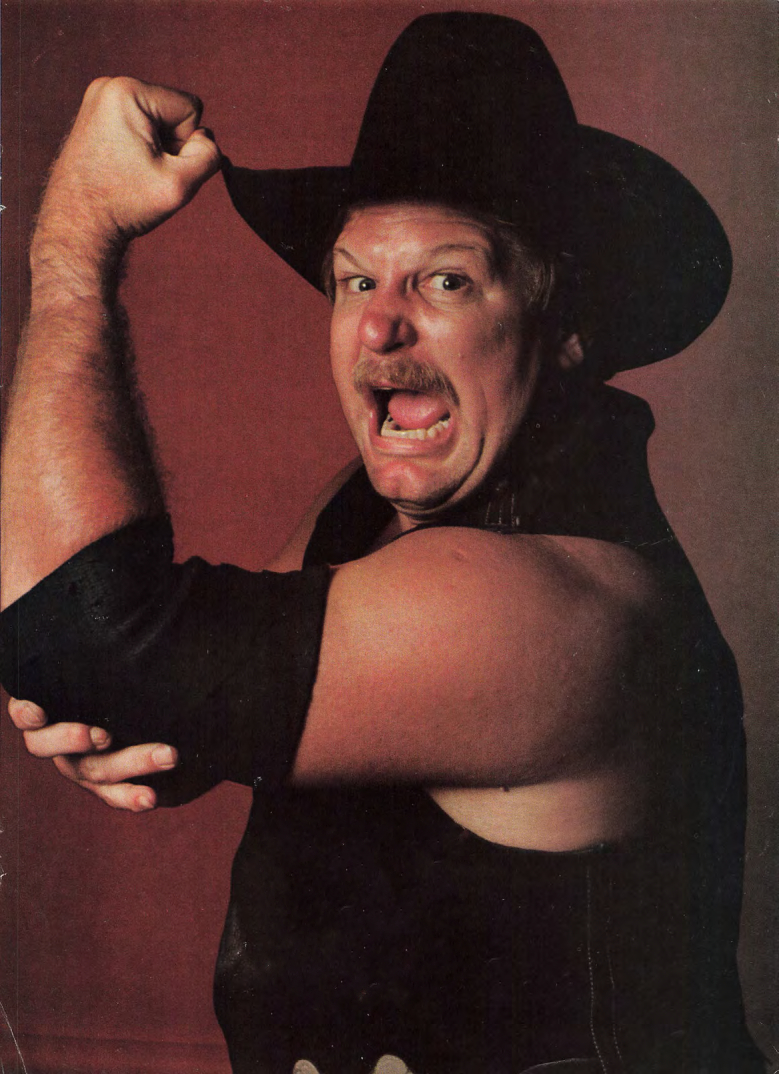
Stan Hansen (pictured) and Vader were the first foreign tag team to win the award.

Year	Winner	Promotion
1975	Antonio Inoki and Seiji Sakaguchi	New Japan Pro-Wrestling
1976	Seiji Sakaguchi and Strong Kobayashi	New Japan Pro-Wrestling
1978	Giant Baba and Jumbo Tsuruta	All Japan Pro Wrestling
1980	Giant Baba and Jumbo Tsuruta	All Japan Pro Wrestling
1981	Antonio Inoki and Tatsumi Fujinami	New Japan Pro-Wrestling
1982	Giant Baba and Jumbo Tsuruta	All Japan Pro Wrestling
1983	Genichiro Tenryu and Jumbo Tsuruta	All Japan Pro Wrestling
1985	Genichiro Tenryu and Jumbo Tsuruta	All Japan Pro Wrestling
1986	Nobuhiko Takada and Shiro Koshinaka	New Japan Pro-Wrestling
1987	Revolution (Ashura Hara and Genichiro Tenryu)	All Japan Pro Wrestling
1989	Olympics (Jumbo Tsuruta and Yoshiaki Yatsu)	All Japan Pro Wrestling
1990	Keiji Muto and Masahiro Chono	New Japan Pro-Wrestling
1991	Super Generation Army (Mitsuharu Misawa and Toshiaki Kawada)	All Japan Pro Wrestling
1992	Heisei Ishingun (Akitoshi Saito, Kengo Kimura, Masashi Aoyagi and Shiro Koshinaka)	New Japan Pro-Wrestling
1993	Super Generation Army (Kenta Kobashi and Mitsuharu Misawa)	All Japan Pro Wrestling
1994	Super Generation Army (Kenta Kobashi and Mitsuharu Misawa)	All Japan Pro Wrestling
1995	Cho-Ten (Hiroyoshi Tenzan and Masahiro Chono)	New Japan Pro-Wrestling
1996	nWo Japan (Hiro Saito, Hiroyoshi Tenzan and Masahiro Chono)	New Japan Pro-Wrestling
1997	Holy Demon Army (Akira Taue and Toshiaki Kawada)	All Japan Pro Wrestling
1998	Stan Hansen and Vader	All Japan Pro Wrestling
1999	Burning (Jun Akiyama and Kenta Kobashi)	All Japan Pro Wrestling
2000	Tencozy (Hiroyoshi Tenzan and Satoshi Kojima)	New Japan Pro-Wrestling
2001	Jado and Gedo	New Japan Pro-Wrestling
2002	Emblem (Masato Tanaka and Shinjiro Otani)	Pro Wrestling Zero1
2003	Kenta and Naomichi Marufuji	Pro Wrestling Noah
2004	Minoru Suzuki and Yoshihiro Takayama	Pancrase; New Japan Pro-Wrestling
2005	Akebono and Keiji Muto; Ikuto Hidaka and Minoru Fujita	All Japan Pro Wrestling; Pro Wrestling Zero1
2006	Voodoo Murders ("brother" Yasshi, Shuji Kondo, Suwama and Taru)	All Japan Pro Wrestling
2007	Great Bash Heel (Togi Makabe and Toru Yano)	New Japan Pro-Wrestling
2008	Gurentai (Minoru Suzuki and Taiyō Kea)	Pancrase; All Japan Pro Wrestling
2009	Super Megaton Ozumo Powers (Akebono and Ryota Hama)	All Japan Pro Wresetling
2010	Muscle Orchestra (Manabu Nakanishi and Strong Man)	New Japan Pro-Wrestling; Consejo Mundial de Lucha Libre
2011	Strong BJ (Daisuke Sekimoto and Yuji Okabayashi)	Big Japan Pro Wrestling
2012	Get Wild (Manabu Soya and Takao Omori)	All Japan Pro Wrestling
2013	The Mighty Don't Kneel (Mikey Nicholls and Shane Haste)	Pro Wrestling Noah
2014	Dangan Yankees (Masato Tanaka and Takashi Sugiura)	Pro Wrestling Noah; Pro Wrestling Zero1
2015	Atsushi Onita and Chigusa Nagayo	Chō Hanabi Puroresu
2016	Strong BJ (Daisuke Sekimoto and Yuji Okabayashi)	Big Japan Pro Wrestling
2017	Violent Giants (Shuji Ishikawa and Suwama)	All Japan Pro Wrestling
2018	Violent Giants (Shuji Ishikawa and Suwama)	All Japan Pro Wrestling
2019	Violent Giants (Shuji Ishikawa and Suwama)	All Japan Pro Wrestling
2020	Sugiura-gun (Kazushi Sakuraba and Takashi Sugiura)	Pro Wrestling Noah
2021	Dangerous Tekkers (Taichi and Zack Sabre Jr.)	New Japan Pro-Wrestling
2022	United Empire (Jeff Cobb and Great-O-Khan)	New Japan Pro-Wrestling
2023	Bishamon (Hirooki Goto and Yoshi-Hashi)	New Japan Pro-Wrestling
2024	Saito Brothers (Jun Saito and Rei Saito)	All Japan Pro Wrestling
2025	Knock Out Brothers (Oskar and Yuto-Ice)	New Japan Pro-Wrestling

=== Newcomer Award (新人賞, Shinjin-shō) ===
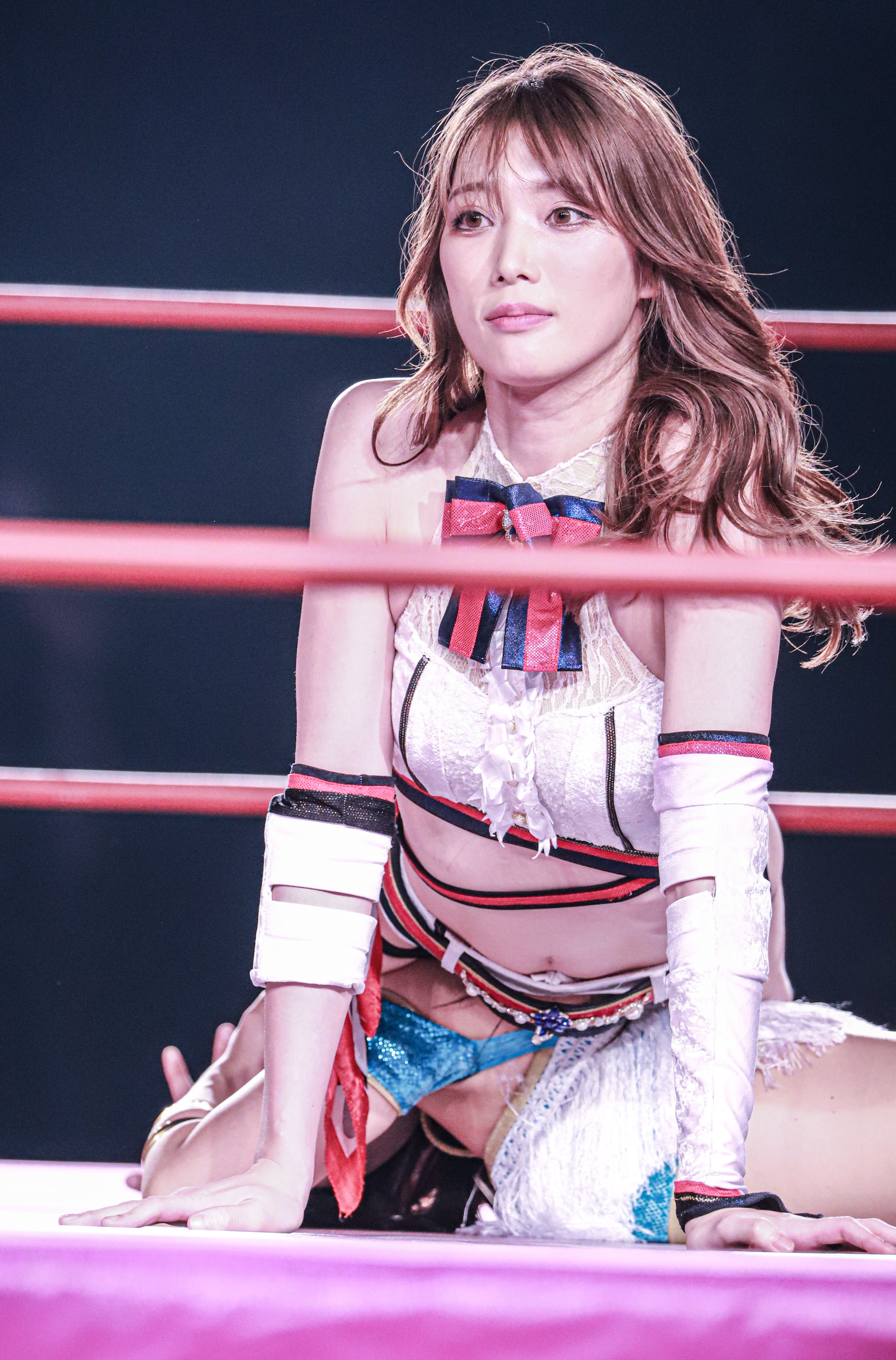
Four women have won the award; Saki Akai was the first woman to win the award in 2014 ...

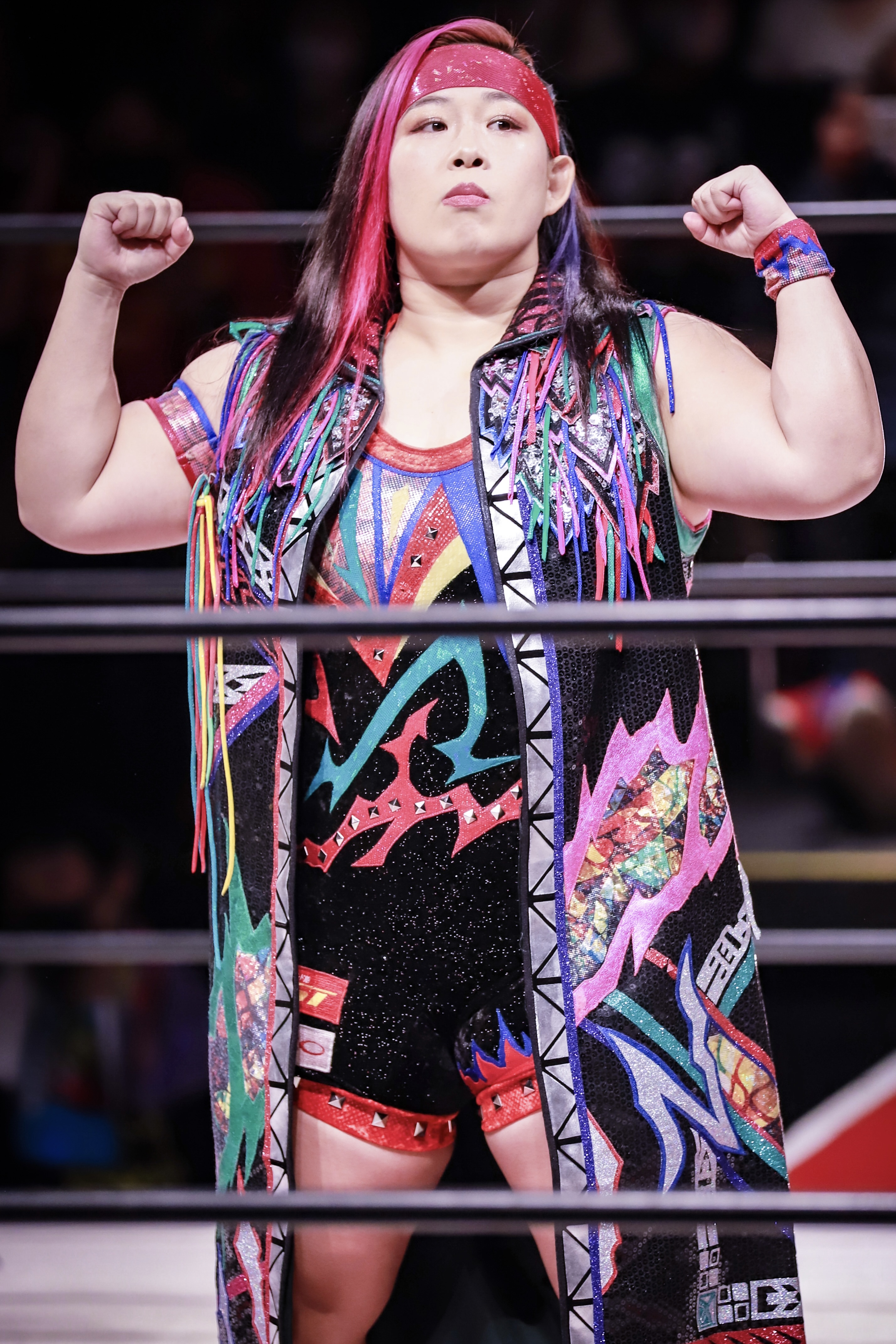
... Chihiro Hashimoto in 2016 ...

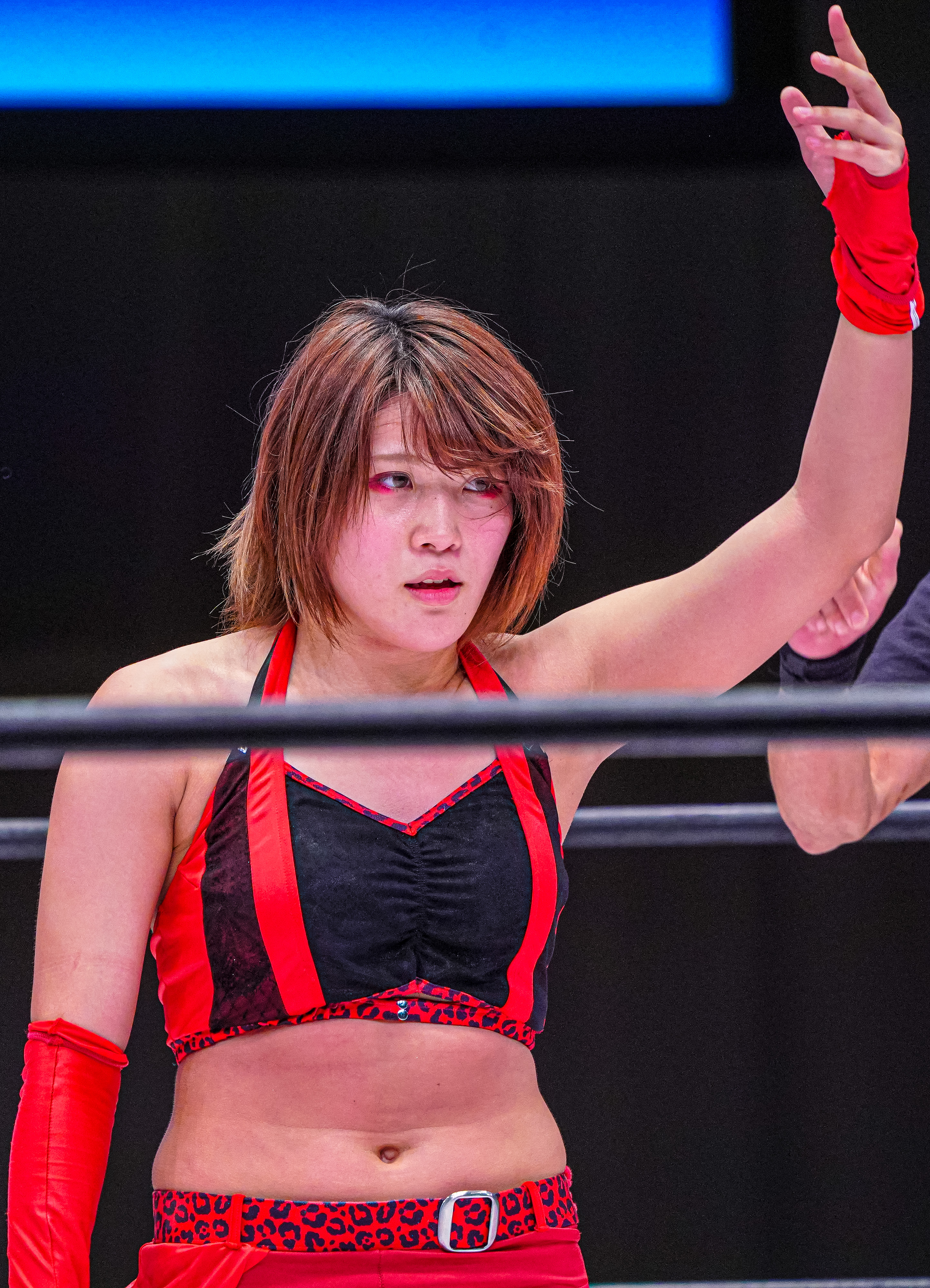
... Utami Hayashishita in 2018, four months after her debut ...

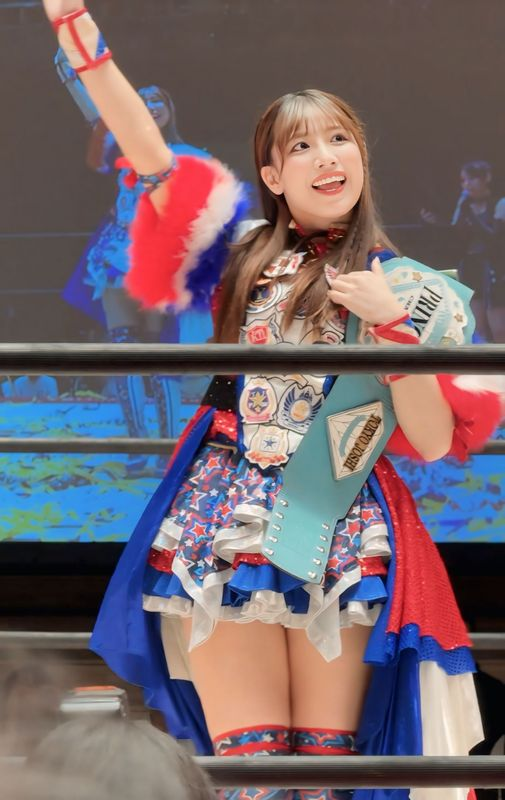
... and Yuki Arai in 2021, the most recent.

Year	Winner	Promotion
1974	Tatsumi Fujinami	New Japan Pro-Wrestling
1982	Mitsuharu Misawa	All Japan Pro Wrestling
1983	Tarzan Goto	All Japan Pro Wrestling
1985	Keiichi Yamada	New Japan Pro-Wrestling
1986	Keiji Muto	New Japan Pro-Wrestling
1987	John Tenta	All Japan Pro Wrestling
1988	Hiroshi Hase	New Japan Pro-Wrestling
1989	Kenta Kobashi	All Japan Pro Wrestling
1990	Masashi Aoyagi	New Japan Pro-Wrestling
1991	Masao Orihara	Super World of Sports
1992	Jun Akiyama	All Japan Pro Wrestling
1993	Jinsei Shinzaki; Shinjiro Otani	Michinoku Pro Wrestling; New Japan Pro-Wrestling
1994	Manabu Yamada	Pancrase
1995	Daisuke Ikeda; Masato Tanaka	Pro Wrestling Fujiwara Gumi; Frontier Martial-Arts Wrestling
1996	Yuki Kondo	Pancrase
1997	Kazuyuki Fujita	New Japan Pro-Wrestling
1998	Yoshinobu Kanemaru	All Japan Pro Wrestling
1999	Naomichi Marufuji	All Japan Pro Wrestling
2000	Kenzo Suzuki; Takeshi Rikio	New Japan Pro-Wrestling; Pro Wrestling Noah
2001	Takehiro Murahama	Osaka Pro Wrestling
2002	Kazuhiko Ogasawara	Pro Wrestling Zero-One
2003	Shinsuke Nakamura	New Japan Pro-Wrestling
2004	Katsuhiko Nakajima	Kensuke Office
2005	Akebono	All Japan Pro Wrestling
2006	HG	Hustle
2007	B×B Hulk	Dragon Gate
2008	Atsushi Sawada	Inoki Genome Federation
2009	Ryota Hama	All Japan Pro Wrestling
2010	Yuji Okabayashi	Big Japan Pro Wrestling
2011	Shinichi Suzukawa	Inoki Genome Federation
2012	Daichi Hashimoto	Pro Wrestling Zero1
2013	Konosuke Takeshita	DDT Pro-Wrestling
2014	Saki Akai	DDT Pro-Wrestling
2016	Chihiro Hashimoto	Sendai Girls' Pro Wrestling
2017	Yuma Aoyagi	All Japan Pro Wrestling
2018	Utami Hayashishita	World Wonder Ring Stardom
2019	Strong Machine J	Dragongate
2021	Yuki Arai	Tokyo Joshi Pro Wrestling
2022	Yuma Anzai	All Japan Pro Wrestling
2023	Saito Brothers	All Japan Pro Wrestling
2024	Oleg Boltin	New Japan Pro-Wrestling
2025	Kaisei Takechi	DDT Pro-Wrestling; The Rampage from Exile Tribe

=== Women's Wrestling Grand Prize (女子プロレス大賞, Joshi puroresu taishō) ===
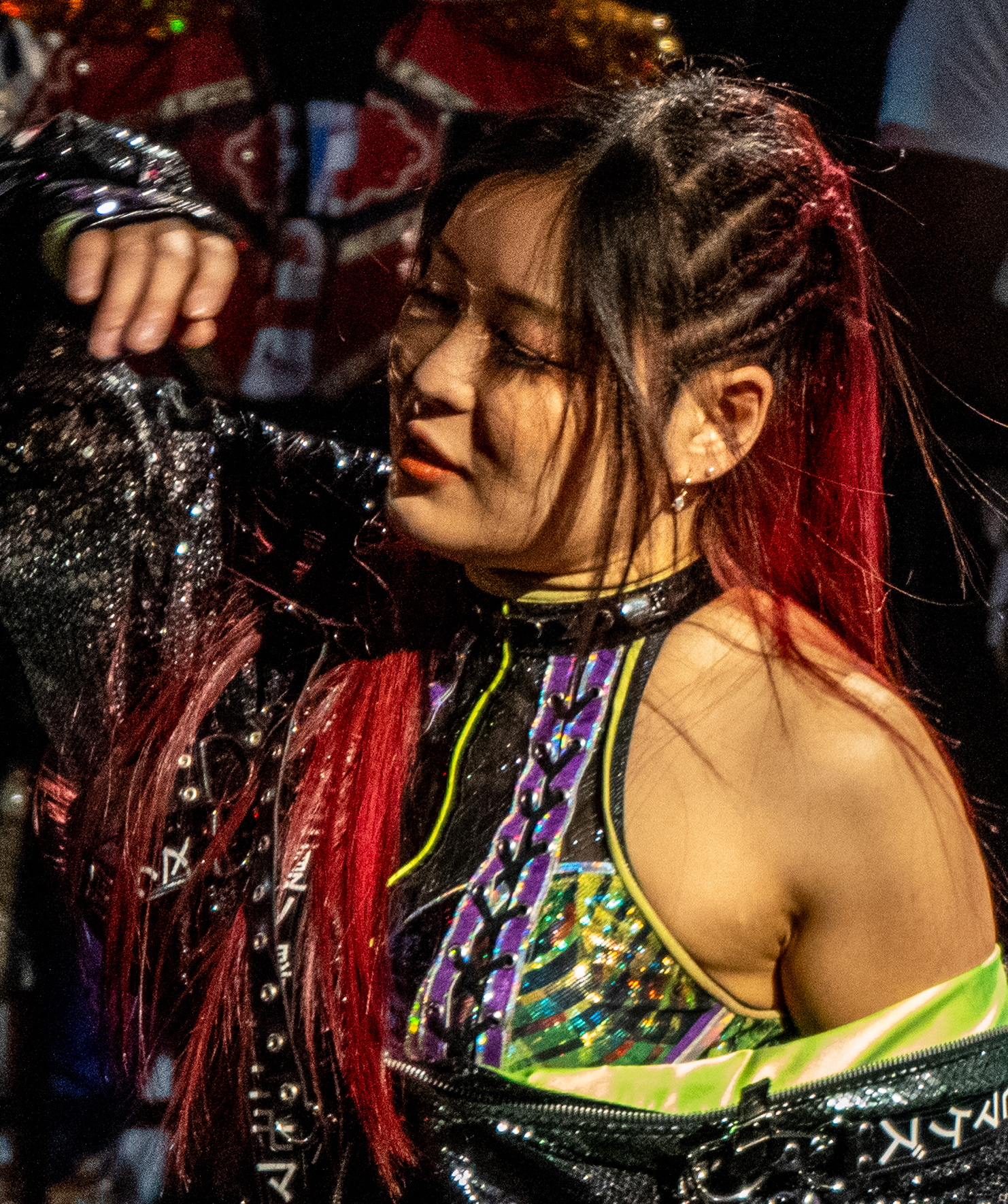
Io Shirai, also known as Iyo Sky, is a record three-time winner of the category, having additionally won all awards consecutively between 2015 and 2017.

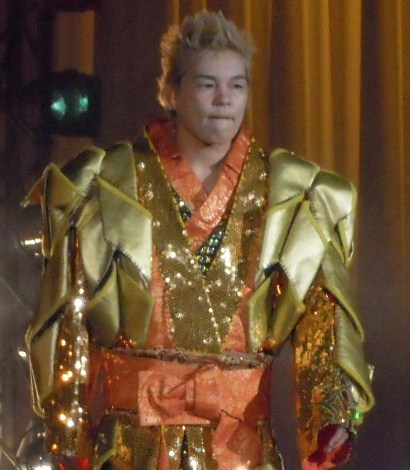
Shinobu Kandori, two-time and inaugural winner of the category.

Year	Winner	Promotion
1995	Shinobu Kandori	Ladies Legend Pro-Wrestling
1996	Kyoko Inoue	All Japan Women's Pro-Wrestling
1997	Eagle Sawai; Lioness Asuka; Shark Tsuchiya	Ladies Legend Pro-Wrestling; JDStar; Frontier Martial-Arts Wrestling
1998	Shinobu Kandori	Ladies Legend Pro-Wrestling
1999	Lioness Asuka	Gaea Japan
2000	Etsuko Mita and Mima Shimoda	Hyper Visual Fighting Arsion; All Japan Women's Pro-Wrestling
2001	Kaoru Ito	All Japan Women's Pro-Wrestling
2002	Momoe Nakanishi	All Japan Women's Pro-Wrestling
2003	Ayako Hamada	Gaea Japan
2009	Emi Sakura	Ice Ribbon
2010	Nanae Takahashi	NEO Japan Ladies Pro-Wrestling
2011	Yuzuki Aikawa	World Wonder Ring Stardom
2012	Yuzuki Aikawa	World Wonder Ring Stardom
2013	Meiko Satomura	Sendai Girls' Pro Wrestling
2015	Io Shirai	World Wonder Ring Stardom
2016	Io Shirai	World Wonder Ring Stardom
2017	Io Shirai	World Wonder Ring Stardom
2018	Tsukasa Fujimoto	Ice Ribbon
2019	Mayu Iwatani	World Wonder Ring Stardom
2020	Giulia	World Wonder Ring Stardom
2021	Utami Hayashishita	World Wonder Ring Stardom
2022	Syuri	World Wonder Ring Stardom
2023	Tam Nakano	World Wonder Ring Stardom
2024	Sareee	Sareee-ism
2025	Saya Kamitani	World Wonder Ring Stardom

=== Topic Award (話題賞, Wadai-shō) ===
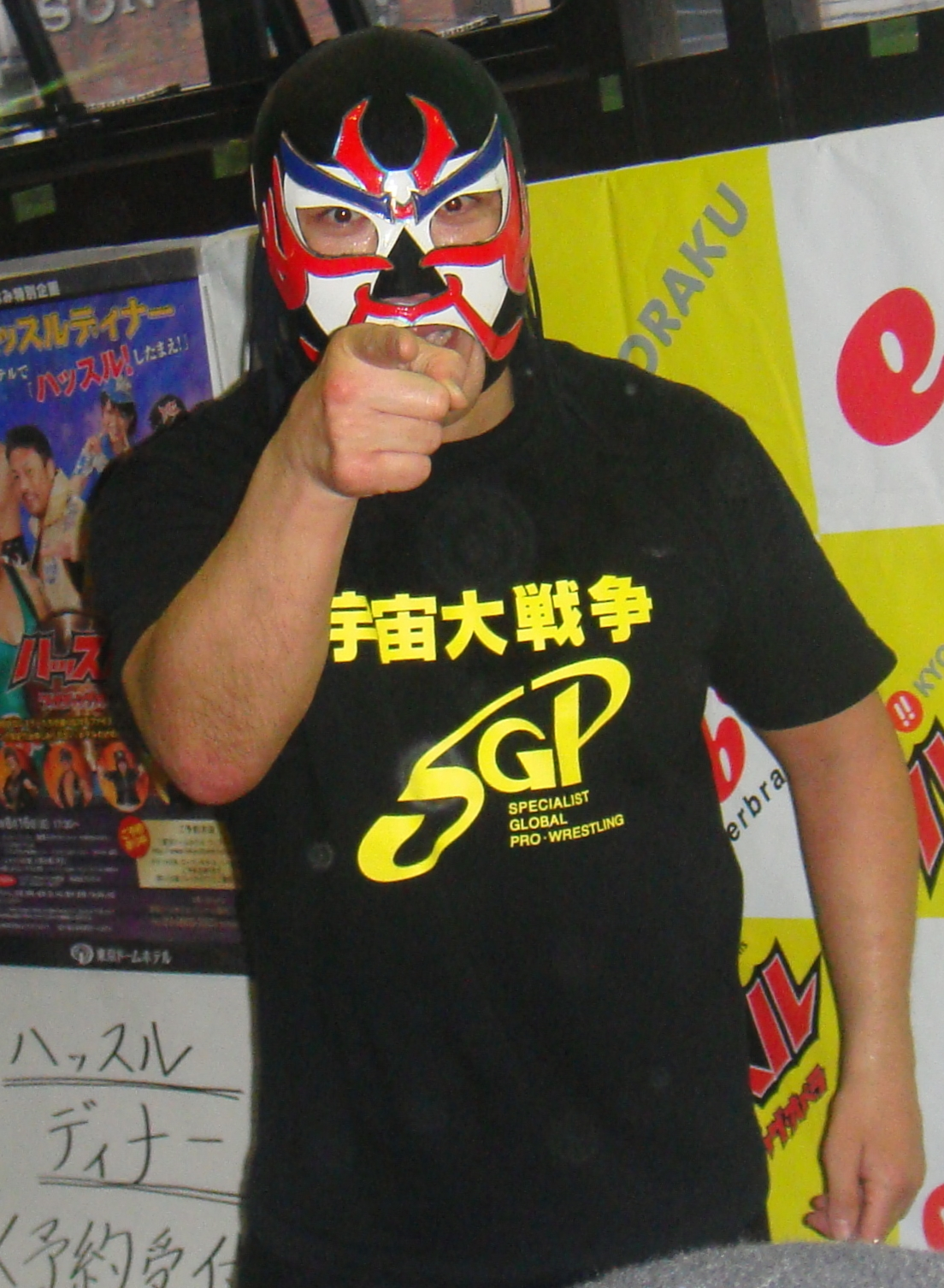
The Great Sasuke and his Michinoku Pro Wrestling promotion won the category in 1993

Year	Winner	Promotion
1990	Kōji Kitao	New Japan Pro-Wrestling
1991	Atsushi Onita	Frontier Martial-Arts Wrestling
1993	The Great Sasuke and Michinoku Pro Wrestling	
1997	Naoya Ogawa	New Japan Pro-Wrestling
1998	Alexander Otsuka	Kakuto Tanteidan Battlarts
2002	Hidehiko Yoshida	Pride Fighting Championships
2004	Akira Hokuto	Kensuke Office
2005	Yinling the Erotic Terrorist	Hustle
2006	Mecha Mummy	Union Pro Wrestling
2024	Dump Matsumoto; Bull Nakano; Mayu Iwatani	— — World Wonder Ring Stardom
2025	Teppei Arita	Cream Stew

== Nonsequential awards ==
These awards are not given out every year, but are given when either applicable or announced by Tokyo Sports.

=== Lifetime Achievement Award (特別功労賞, Tokubetsu kōrō-shō) ===
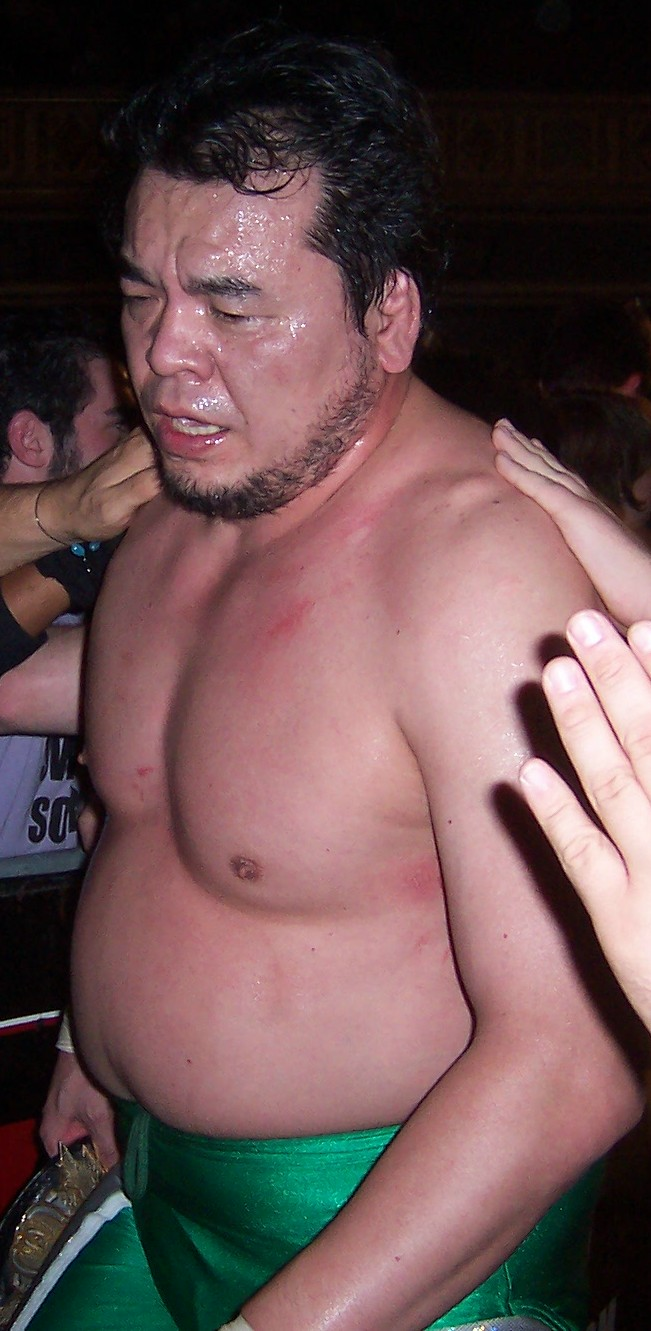
Mitsuharu Misawa was named for the award after his death in 2009 ...

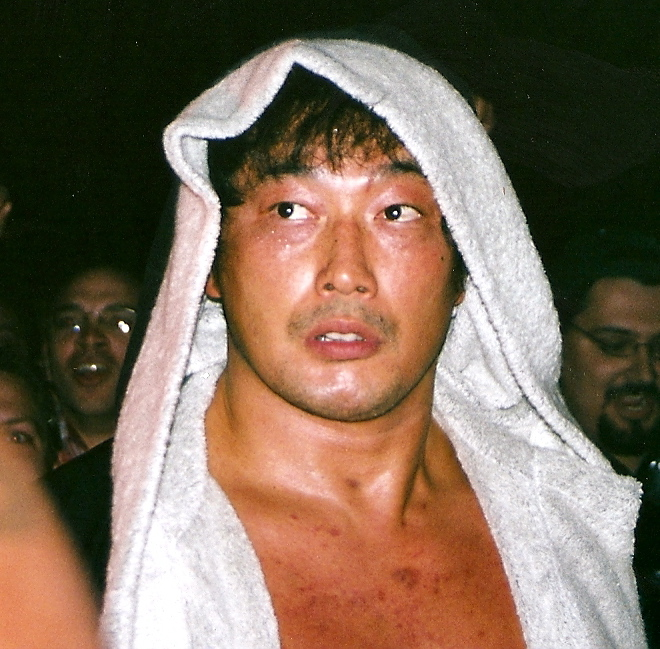
... Kenta Kobashi after his retirement in 2013 ...

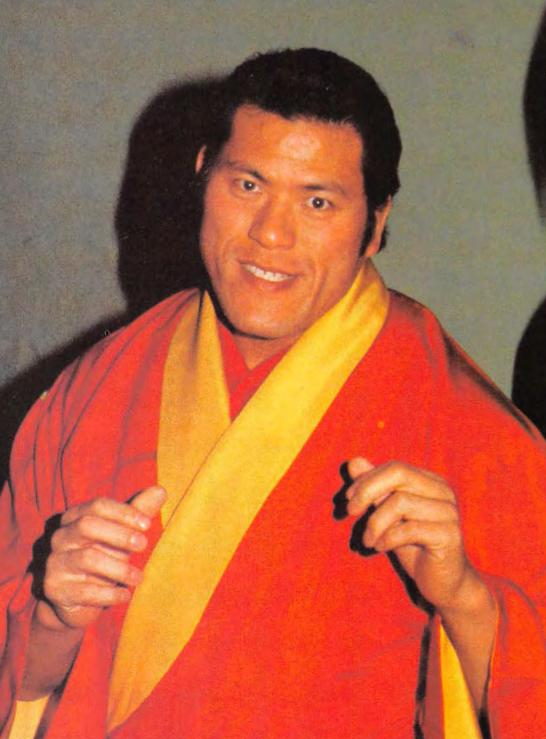
... and Antonio Inoki after his death in 2022.

Year	Winner
1978	Isao Yoshihara
1979	Joe Higuchi; Kotetsu Yamamoto; Masafumi Suzuki
1983	Hisashi Shinma; Terry Funk
1988	Bruiser Brody
1989	Antonio Inoki
1990	Seiji Sakaguchi
1991	Dynamite Kid
1999	Giant Baba
2000	Jumbo Tsuruta; Stan Hansen
2009	Mitsuharu Misawa
2010	Joe Higuchi; Kantaro Hoshino; Kotetsu Yamamoto; Rusher Kimura
2013	Kenta Kobashi
2019	Atsushi Aoki
2021	Rumi Kazama
2022	Antonio Inoki

=== Service Award (功労賞, Kōrō-shō) ===
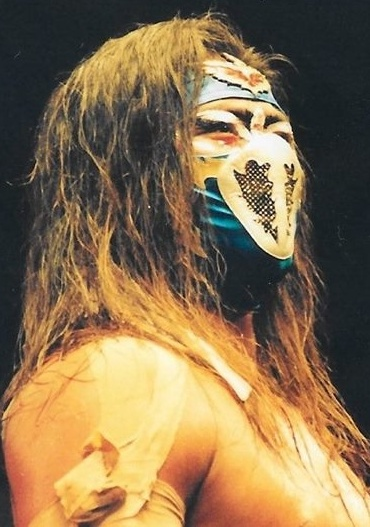
The latest winner of the Service Award was Hayabusa, who achieved it following his 2016 passing

Year	Winner
1981	Motoyuki Kitazawa; Snake Amami
1982	Mr. Hayashi; Yonetaro Tanaka
1987	Animal Hamaguchi; Great Kojika; Haru Sonoda
1988	Masanobu Kurisu; Shunji Kosugi
1989	Takashi Ishikawa
1993	Motoshi Okuma
1994	Ashura Hara
1995	Kantaro Hoshino
1997	Joe Higuchi; Megumi Kudo; Riki Choshu
1999	Hiro Matsuda; Jackie Sato; Jumbo Tsuruta; Masa Saito; Yoshinosato
2000	Kuniaki Kobayashi; Masakatsu Funaki
2001	Osamu Kido; Yoshihiro Momota
2002	Motoko Baba; Thunder Sugiyama
2003	Kodo Fuyuki; Mitsu Hirai
2006	Black Cat; Haruka Eigen; Kintarō Ōki; Rusher Kimura
2007	Karl Gotch
2008	Great Kusatsu
2009	Takashi Matsunaga; Ted Tanabe
2016	Hayabusa

=== Special Award (特別賞, Tokubetsu-shō) ===
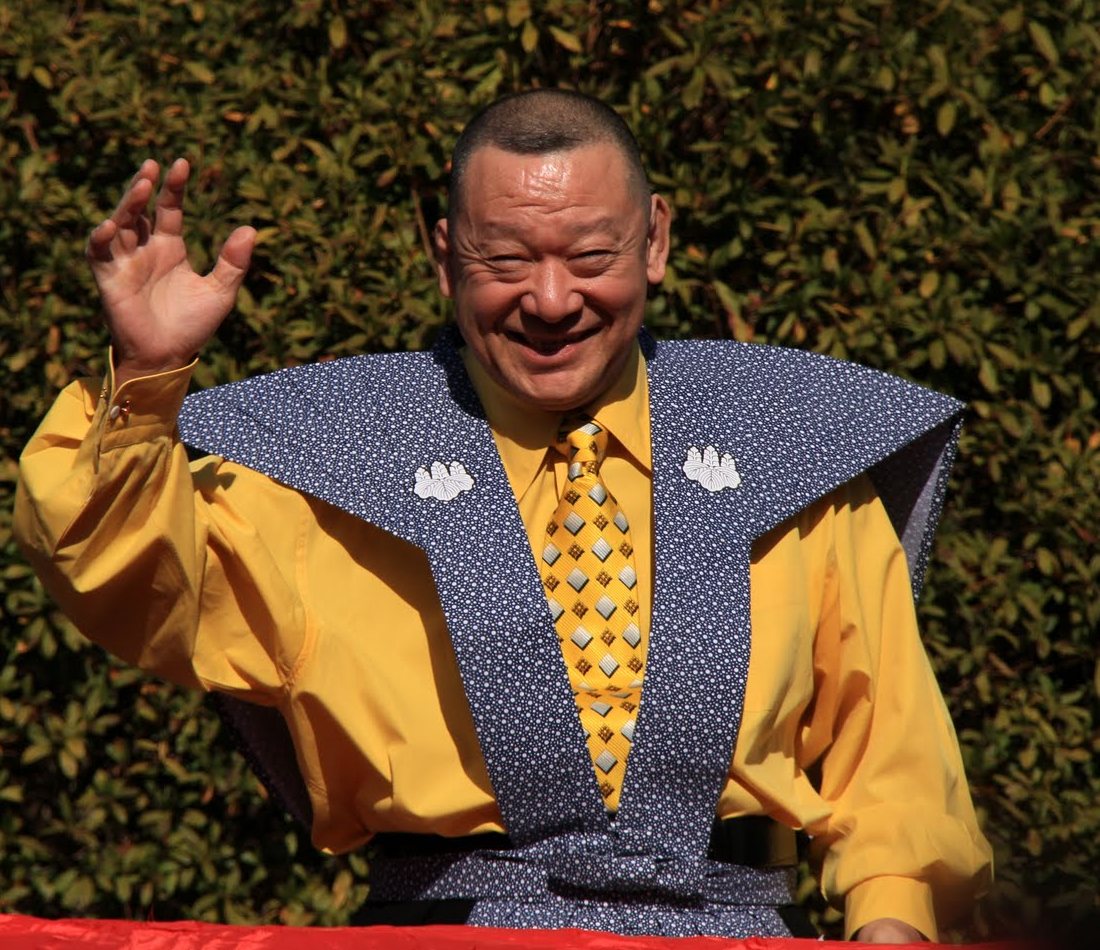
Animal Hamaguchi won the category for his training in 1997

Year	Winner	Promotion
1974	Mighty Inoue	International Wrestling Enterprise
1986	Hiroshi Wajima	All Japan Pro Wrestling
1989	Atsushi Onita; The Great Muta	Frontier Martial-Arts Wrestling; World Championship Wrestling
1993	All Japan Women's Pro-Wrestling	
1994	Akira Hokuto	All Japan Women's Pro-Wrestling
1997	Animal Hamaguchi	Hamaguchi Gym
2001	Tajiri	World Wrestling Federation
2003	Seiji Sakaguchi	New Japan Pro-Wrestling
2017	Jurina Matsui	Tofu Puroresu

== Inactive awards ==
=== Wrestling Special Award (レスリング特別賞, Resuringu tokubetsu-shō) ===
A special award, this award was typically given to Japanese champions in United World Wrestling World Wrestling Championships, or in the Olympic Games.

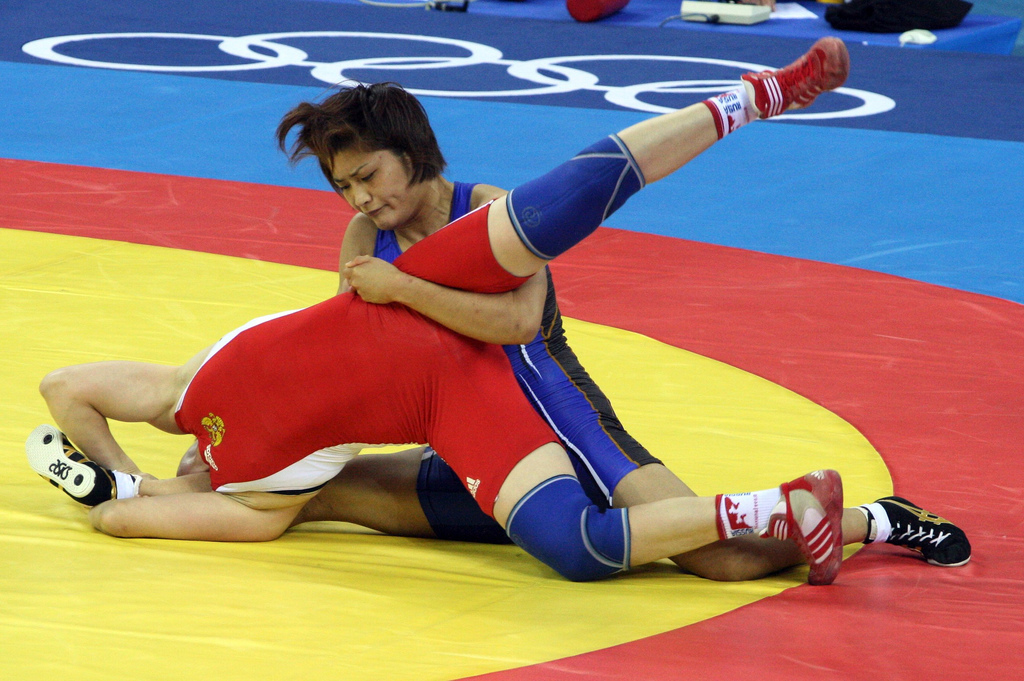
Kaori Icho is a record eleven-time winner of the category

Year	Winner
1998	Atsuko Shinomura; Kyoko Hamaguchi; Miyu Ikeda
1999	Ayako Shōda; Kyoko Hamaguchi; Seiko Yamamoto
2000	Hitomi Sakamoto; Katsuhiko Nagata; Seiko Yamamoto
2001	Hitomi Sakamoto; Seiko Yamamoto
2002	Kaori Icho; Kyoko Hamaguchi; Saori Yoshida
2003	Chiharu Icho; Kaori Icho; Kazuhiko Ikematsu; Kyoko Hamaguchi; Saori Yoshida; Seiko Yamamoto
2004	Chiharu Icho; Chikara Tanabe; Kaori Icho; Kenji Inoue; Kyoko Hamaguchi; Saori Yoshida
2005	Ayako Shōda; Hitomi Sakamoto; Kaori Icho; Kyoko Hamaguchi; Makiko Sakamoto
2006	Ayako Sanada; Chiharu Icho; Hitomi Sakamoto; Kaori Icho; Kyoko Hamaguchi; Noriyuki Takatsuka; Saori Yoshida
2009	Mio Nishimaki; Saori Yoshida; Tatsuhiro Yonemitsu; Yuri Kai
2011	Hitomi Obara; Kaori Icho; Saori Yoshida
2012	Hitomi Obara; Kaori Icho; Saori Yoshida; Tatsuhiro Yonemichi
2013	Eri Tosaka; Kaori Icho; Saori Yoshida
2014	Chiho Hamada; Eri Tosaka; Kaori Icho; Saori Yoshida
2015	Eri Tosaka; Kaori Icho; Saori Yoshida
2016	Eri Tosaka; Kaori Icho; Risako Kawai; Sara Dosho
2017	Haruna Okuno; Kenichiro Fumita; Risako Kawai; Sara Dosho; Yui Susaki; Yuki Takahashi
2018	Haruna Okuno; Takuto Otoguro; Mayu Mukaida; Risako Kawai; Yui Susaki
2019	Risako Kawai; Shinobu Ota; Kenichiro Fumita

=== Best Foreigner Award (最優秀外人賞, Saiyūshū gaijin-shō) ===
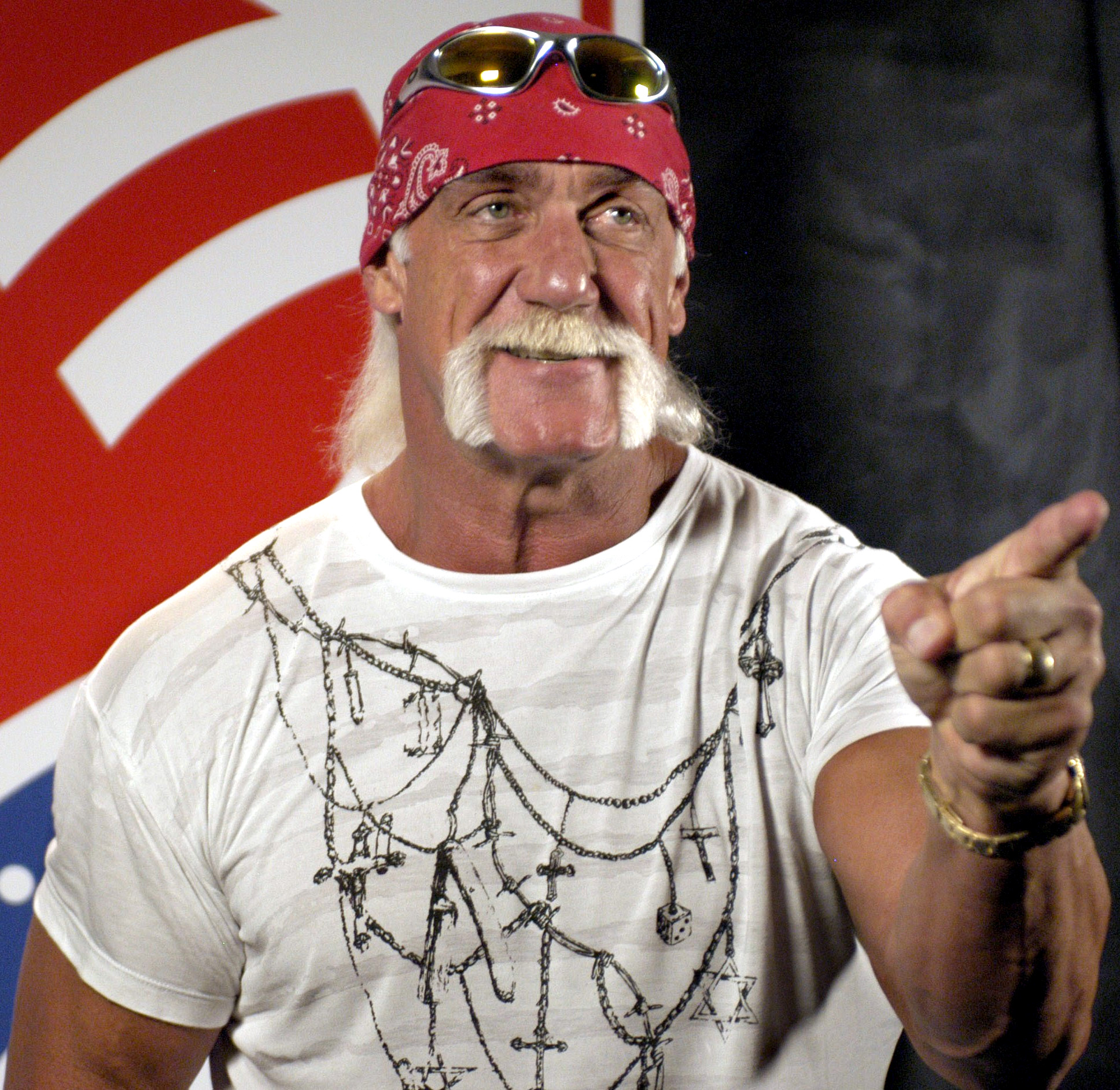
Hulk Hogan is a one-time winner of the category

Year	Winner	Promotion
1982	Stan Hansen	All Japan Pro Wrestling
1983	Hulk Hogan	New Japan Pro-Wrestling
1985	The Road Warriors	All Japan Pro Wrestling

=== Best Referee Award (優秀レフェリー賞, Yūshū referī-shō) ===
Year	Winner	Promotion
1986	Kyohei Wada	All Japan Pro Wrestling

=== Effort Award (努力賞, Doryoku-shō) ===
Year	Winner	Promotion
1974	Isamu Teranishi; Koma Mashimo; Kotetsu Yamamoto	International Wrestling Enterprise; All Japan Pro Wrestling; New Japan Pro-Wrestling
1975	Akihisa Takachiho; Snake Amami; Yoshiaki Fujiwara	All Japan Pro Wrestling; International Wrestling Enterprise; New Japan Pro-Wrestling
1976	Masanobu Fuchi; Ryuma Go; Shoji Kai	All Japan Pro Wrestling; New Japan Pro-Wrestling; International Wrestling Enterprise
1977	Goro Tsurumi; Riki Choshu; Rocky Hata	International Wrestling Enterprise; New Japan Pro-Wrestling; All Japan Pro Wrestling
1978	Kazuharu Sonoda; Keiji Ishikawa; Kuniaki Kobayashi; Snake Amami	All Japan Pro Wrestling; All Japan Pro Wrestling; New Japan Pro-Wrestling; International Wrestling Enterprise
1979	Atsushi Onita; Makoto Arakawa; Masahiko Takasugi	All Japan Pro Wrestling; New Japan Pro-Wrestling; International Wrestling Enterprise
1980	George Takano; Mach Hayato; Prince Tonga	New Japan Pro-Wrestling; International Wrestling Enterprise; All Japan Pro Wrestling
1981	Akira Maeda; Animal Hamaguchi; Keiji Ishikawa	All Japan Pro Wrestling; International Wrestling Enterprise; New Japan Pro-Wrestling
1982	Shiro Koshinaka; Yoshiaki Fujiwara	All Japan Pro Wrestling; New Japan Pro-Wrestling
1983	Masanobu Fuchi; Nobuhiko Takada	All Japan Pro Wrestling; New Japan Pro-Wrestling

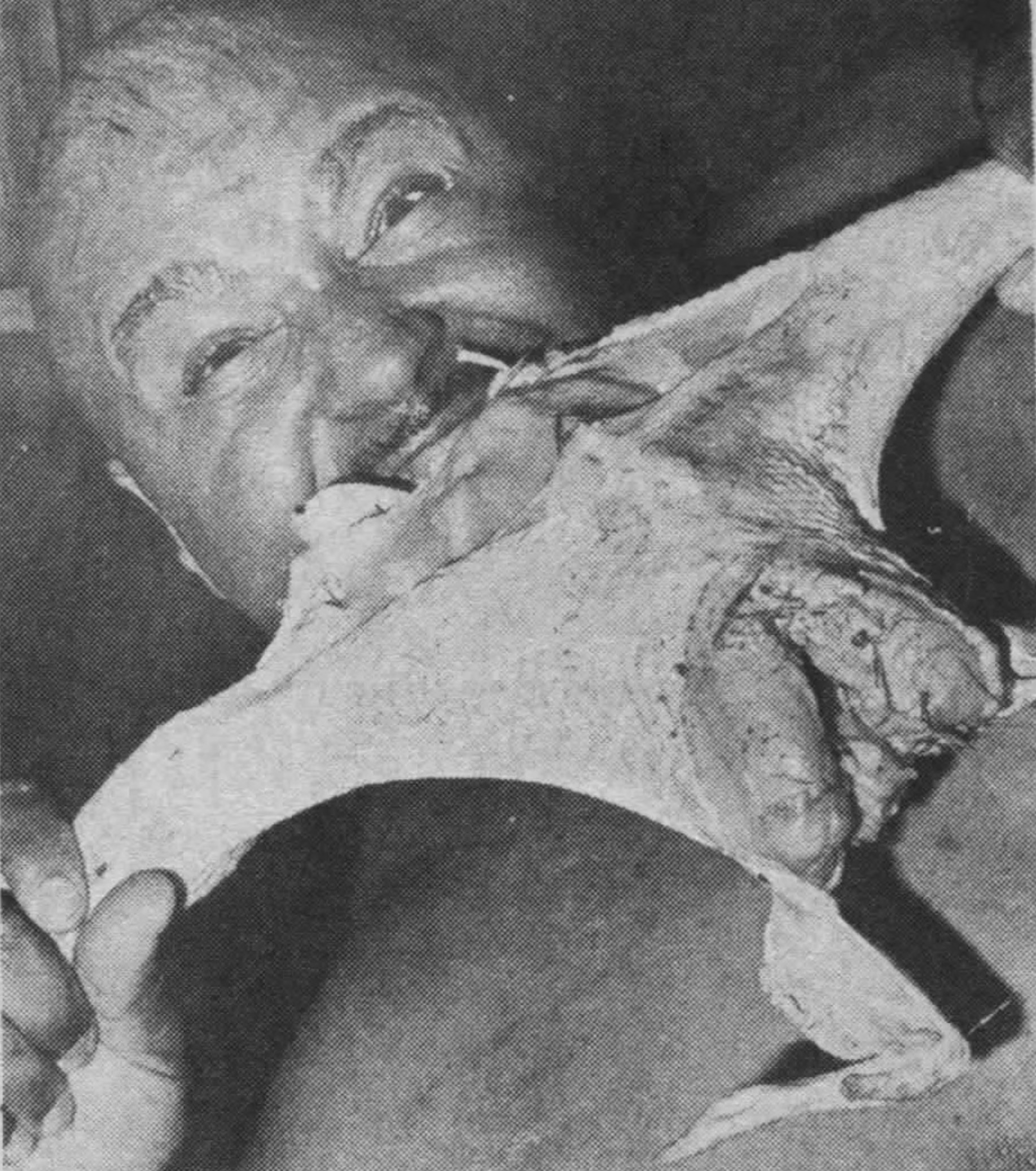
Abdullah the Butcher is one of only two wrestlers to win the award twice (the other is Giant Baba)

=== Popularity Award (大衆賞, Taishū-shō) ===
Year	Winner	Promotion
1975	The Destroyer	All Japan Pro Wrestling
1976	Giant Baba	All Japan Pro Wrestling
1978	Abdullah the Butcher; Umanosuke Ueda	All Japan Pro Wrestling; New Japan Pro-Wrestling
1979	Terry Funk	All Japan Pro Wrestling
1980	Abdullah the Butcher; Stan Hansen	All Japan Pro Wrestling; New Japan Pro-Wrestling
1981	Tiger Mask	New Japan Pro-Wrestling
1983	The Great Kabuki	All Japan Pro Wrestling
1988	Giant Baba; Rusher Kimura	All Japan Pro Wrestling

=== Special Grand Prize (特別大賞, Tokubetsu taishō) ===
Year	Winner	Promotion
1983	Antonio Inoki; Giant Baba	New Japan Pro-Wrestling; All Japan Pro Wrestling
1987	Antonio Inoki vs. Masa Saito (October 4)	New Japan Pro-Wrestling
1988	Akira Maeda	Universal Wrestling Federation
1992	Mitsuharu Misawa	All Japan Pro Wrestling
1995	New Japan Pro-Wrestling vs. UWF International (October 9)	

== See also ==
- List of professional wrestling awards
