= Kyohei Wada =

Japanese wrestling referee

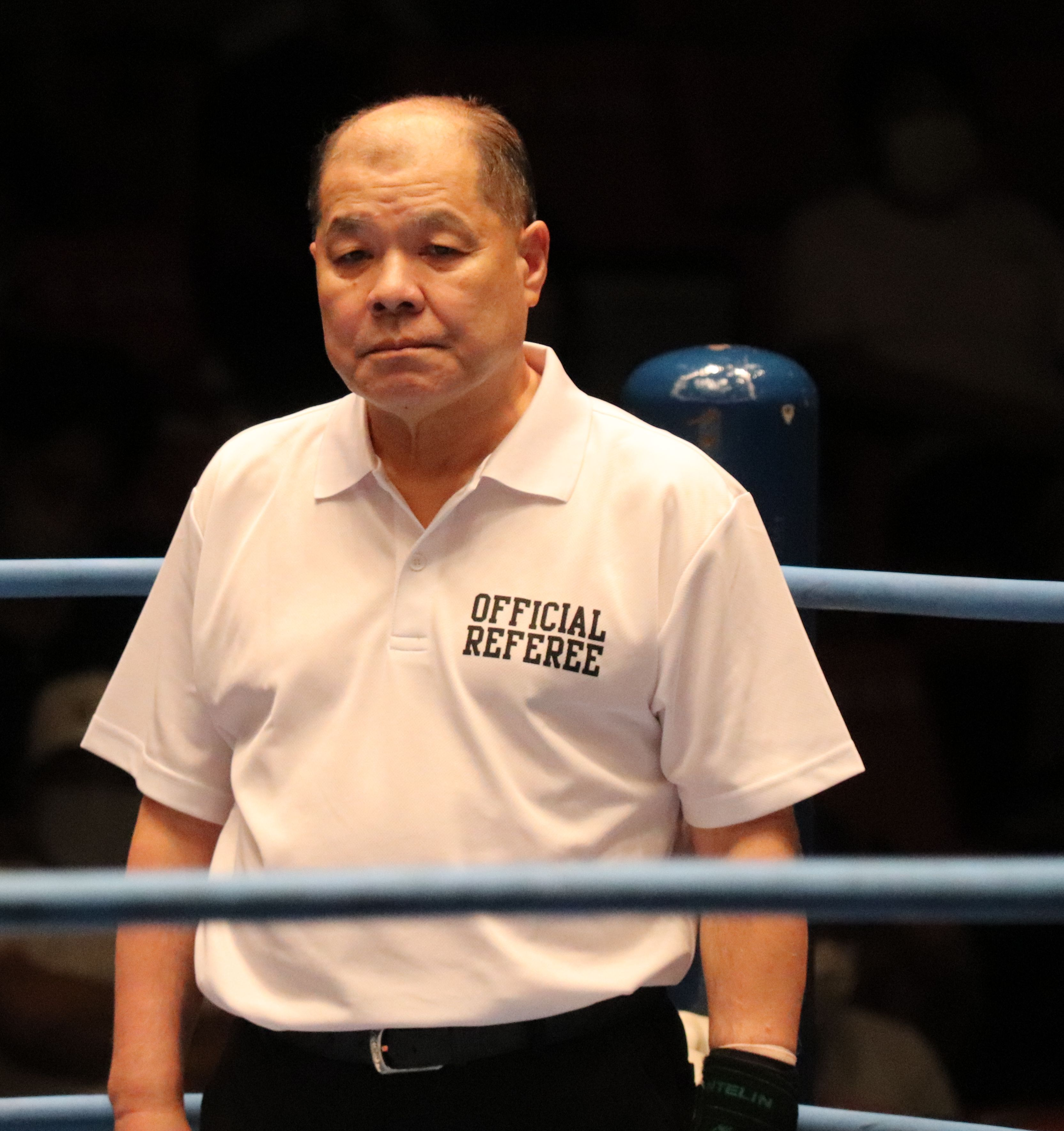
- Kyohei Wada in 2021

Personal information
- Born: November 20, 1954 (age 71) Adachi, Tokyo, Japan

Professional wrestling career
- Ring name: Kyohei Wada
- Trained by: Joe Higuchi
- Debut: 1974

Kyohei Wada (和田 京平, Wada Kyōhei; born November 20, 1954) is a Japanese professional wrestling senior referee best known for his work in All Japan Pro Wrestling (AJPW). He is the longest-tenured member of the All Japan Pro Wrestling roster, having worked for the company from 1972 to the present day. Throughout his career, he refereed some of the most famous matches in Japanese pro wrestling history, making him one of its most recognisable and popular figures.

== Career ==
=== All Japan Pro Wrestling (1972–2011) ===
After graduating from junior high school, Wada got a job at a shipping company, and one of his jobs was to deliver and set up the ring for All Japan Pro Wrestling. Wada caught the eye of owner Giant Baba, who noticed he was light on his feet and asked if he would be interested in training to be a referee. Wada accepted the offer and began training under then-All Japan senior referee Joe Higuchi, and made his refereeing debut in 1974. During his early career, Wada was limited to only referee opening matches, as he was considered the lowest ranking referee behind Higuchi, Masao Hattori and Koichi Hayashi. However, after Hattori left for New Japan Pro-Wrestling (NJPW) in 1984 and Hayashi was transferred to All Japan Women's Pro Wrestling (AJW), Wada's position rose greatly and the first main event match he refereed was the Genichiro Tenryu vs Jumbo Tsuruta singles match on August 31, 1987. Wada quickly became recognisable for his agile movement around the ring, often jumping over wrestlers to get in a position to count a pinfall. Before matches, fans would often loudly chant "Kyohei!” after ring announcer Ryu Nakada would say "referee, Wada Kyohei". Wada and Nakada were affectionately dubbed "Golden Combi" by All Japan fans during their time with the promotion.

After Joe Higuchi began taking less and less matches into his later career, Wada became the head referee for All Japan during the 1990s and served as referee to a large number of well known Triple Crown Heavyweight Championship matches during the 1990s. Wada and Nakada were also very close with Giant Baba, who would take both of them with him on vacation and travel with them to shows, with Wada especially working closely with Baba as his personal assistant. When Baba died in January 1999, Wada and Nakada were the only non-family members allowed at Baba's bedside for his final moments.

After Mitsuharu Misawa and the majority of the All Japan roster left the promotion in May 2000 during a mass exodus, Wada was one of only three employees to remain with the promotion alongside Masanobu Fuchi and Toshiaki Kawada. By the mid-2000s, Wada had overseen at least 10,000 wrestling matches, and his position as a highly respected referee led to him being asked by other promotions such as Big Mouth Loud, Pro Wrestling Noah and Kensuke Office to referee for them. At Mitsuharu Misawa's memorial show in 2009, Wada served as referee for the main event, pitting Akira Taue and Toshiaki Kawada against Kenta and Jun Akiyama.

=== Freelance (2011–2013) ===
On June 21, 2011, Wada surprised many fans when he announced he had left All Japan Pro Wrestling and would be going freelance. Wada's departure was in response to what he viewed as AJPW president Keiji Mutoh's poor handling of the backstage incident between Nobukazu Hirai and Yoshikazu Taru and the rest of the Voodoo Murders. Wada said he felt that Mutoh's lack of a public apology to Hirai "betrayed All Japan Pro Wrestling" and cited it as the main reason for his departure. The same day he announced his departure from All Japan, Wada was offered a position of head referee in Smash, and debuted for the promotion in July. Wada expressed interest in wanting to referee wherever he could, and also began refereeing for all female promotion Reina at Reina 19 in October. On August 18, 2012, Wada was a referee at DDT Pro-Wrestling's Budokan Peter Pan.

=== Return to AJPW (2013–present) ===
On June 30, 2013, Wada refereed an All Japan match for the first time in two years at Pro Wrestling Love in Ryogoku, the last show held under Mutoh before he and much of the roster would leave the promotion just days later. On July 5, Wada announced his full time return to All Japan as senior referee. In December 2014, he celebrated both his 40th anniversary as a referee and his 60th birthday with a special celebration show produced by himself under the AJPW banner. Wada chose all matches on the card and was showered with streamers before the main event.

Wada was sidelined from refereeing on January 2, 2017, when he sustained a broken ankle after falling from the top rope and to the floor during a battle royal. He made his return in April, refereeing a 2017 Champion Carnival match between Zeus and Kai.

== See also ==
Professional wrestling in Japan
All Japan Pro Wrestling
