= Joe Higuchi =

Personal information
- Born: Kanji Higuchi (樋口 寛治, Higuchi Kanji); January 18, 1929 Yokohama, Kanagawa, Japan
- Died: November 8, 2010 (aged 81)

Professional wrestling career
- Ring name: Joe Higuchi
- Billed height: 5 ft 10 in (1.78 m)
- Billed weight: 220 lb (100 kg)
- Trained by: Raúl Romero and Tojo Yamamoto
- Debut: 1954
- Retired: As wrestler: 1960; As referee: 1997

Kanji Higuchi (樋口 寛治, Higuchi Kanji; January 19, 1929 – November 8, 2010), better known as Joe Higuchi (ジョー樋口, Jō Higuchi) was a Japanese professional wrestler, road agent, on-air personality and referee best known for his tenures with the Japan Pro Wrestling Alliance (JWA) and All Japan Pro-Wrestling. The first official Japanese referee in the NWA, he was known as one of the best referees in the business and the most popular referee in Japanese Puroresu history.

He was inducted into the Professional Wrestling Hall of Fame and Museum as a member of the Class of 2018.

== Early life ==
Higuchi Kanji was born on January 19, 1929, in Yokohama, Japan. He was a judo practitioner in his youth and became a judo instructor for the GHQ after World War II. Working as a trainer for the mostly-American soldiers, he was able to learn English and gained the nickname "Joe".

== JWA ==
Higuchi had trained in professional wrestling with Raúl Romero and Tojo Yamamoto and in 1954, he joined the All Japan Pro-Wrestling Association (which was run by Toshio Yamaguchi and Umeyuki Kiyomikawa) as a professional wrestler. In 1956, he competed in the Japanese Light Heavyweight division tournament where he finished as the third ranked Light Heavyweight in Japan. He also joined the JWA, which of whom he competed with in the 1950s and retired as an in-ring competitor in 1960.

Having learned English during his time with the GHQ, Higuchi returned to the JWA as the interpreter and point of contact for gaijin (foreign) wrestlers. He made his debut as a referee in 1965.

== All Japan Pro Wrestling ==
An AJPW original from its inception in 1972, Higuchi gained fame as the senior referee of the promotion, a position he held from 1972 to 1990. He was also a prominent backstage official for the company and was the "go between" during talent exchanges between AJPW and Dory Funk Sr.'s promotion in America. He was the first official Japanese referee of the NWA, refereeing bouts such the NWA World Heavyweight Championship match between Jack Briscoe and Dory Funk Jr. in St. Louis, United States. In the early 80's AJPW bouts were booked more akin to the American style and Higuchi became known for his bump-taking. He retired as a referee in 1997 and took up the position of caretaker for the gaijin talent. He left AJPW in 1999 following the passing of its founder, Giant Baba. His last officiated match was the Triple Crown Heavyweight Championship bout between Mitsuharu Misawa and "Dr. Death" Steve Williams at Nippon Budokan in Tokyo on March 1, 1997.

On the independently produced DVD WCCW and the Von Erichs, Heroes of World Class, it was stated by WCCW booker Gary Hart that Joe Higuchi was the All Japan official that contacted WCCW when the body of David Von Erich was found while on tour in Japan.

== Pro Wrestling Noah ==
Following Giant Baba's passing in 1999, many of the AJPW talent departed the company to form Pro Wrestling Noah. With his history in the business, Higuchi was brought into Noah by executive and former AJPW ring announcer Nakada Ryu as a member of the board of directors He became the statutory auditor in the promotion and was also the on-air chairman of the GHC Heavyweight Championship committee in 2001.

On November 8, 2010, Higuchi, known as one of Japan's greatest referees, died at the age of 81.

== Legacy ==
During his career, Higuchi refereed more than 20,000 matches over 32 years. On December 5, 2010, Pro Wrestling Noah held the "Joe Higuchi Memorial Show" in Tokyo, Japan in Higuchi's honour. He was posthumously given a Lifetime Achievement Award at the 2010 Tokyo Sports Puroresu Awards and was inducted into the Professional Wrestling Hall of Fame and Museum as a member of the Class of 2018 and the inaugural member of the new referee category.
