= Palms Slam Fest =

2026 professional wrestling event in Nevada

- Promotional poster featuring Ric Flair, Mick Foley, Saraya, Jeff Hardy, Bully Ray, MVP, Bobby Lashley, and Shelton Benjamin
- Promotion(s): Maple Leaf Pro Wrestling; World Wonder Ring Stardom; House of Glory; Tokyo Joshi Pro-Wrestling; Consejo Mundial de Lucha Libre
- Date: April 15-18, 2026
- City: Las Vegas, Nevada
- Venue: Palms Casino Resort

Palms Slam Fest was a multi-day professional wrestling pay-per-view event and fan convention promoted by Paragon Talent Group. The event took place from April 15, 2026 to April 18, 2026 at the Palms Casino Resort in Las Vegas, Nevada during WrestleMania 42 weekend and was streamed live on Triller TV with Stardom American Dream and TJPW Live in Las Vegas being simulcasted on Stardom World and Wrestle Universe.

== Production ==
=== Background ===
On February 26, 2026, it was announced by Paragon Talent Group, a talent agency owned by former WWE 24/7 Champion Mojo Rawley, that they would hold the inaugural Palms Slam Fest during WrestleMania 42 weekend from April 15-18, 2026. The event was confirmed to feature talent from Maple Leaf Pro Wrestling (MLP) with their inaugural United States show, Tokyo Joshi Pro-Wrestling (TJPW), World Wonder Ring Stardom (Stardom), Consejo Mundial de Lucha Libre, and House of Glory (HOG). The event would also feature WWE Hall of Famers the Bella Twins (Nikki Bella and Brie Bella) Mick Foley, and Ric Flair, Saraya, and The Hardys (Matt Hardy and Jeff Hardy) as guests for the event.

On April 9, 2026, Stardom had announced that Maki Itoh, Yuria Hime, and Fuwa-chan were pulled from the event due to travel visa issues which were caused by a long visa processing period.

=== Storylines ===
Palms Slam Fest featured professional wrestling matches that involves different wrestlers from pre-existing scripted feuds and storylines. Wrestlers portrayed villains, heroes, or less distinguishable characters in scripted events that built tension and culminated in a wrestling match or series of matches. Storylines were produced on Maple Leaf Pro Wrestling (MLP), Consejo Mundial de Lucha Libre (CMLL), Tokyo Joshi Pro-Wrestling (TJPW), World Wonder Ring Stardom (Stardom), and House of Glory (HOG) shows.

== Results ==
=== CMLL ===
CMLL at Palms Slam Fest
- Promotion: Consejo Mundial de Lucha Libre (CMLL)
- Date: April 16, 2026

Pay-per-view chronology
← Previous; Fantastica Mania USA	Next → CMLL vs. MLW

No.	Results	Stipulations	Times
1	KeMalito and Periquito Sacaryas defeated Chamuel and Tengu by pinfall	Tag team match	12:04
2	Persephone defeated Tessa Blanchard by pinfall	Singles match for the CMLL World Women's Championship	14:48
3	Blue Panther defeated Ultimo Guerrero by pinfall	Singles match	12:53
4	Soberano Jr., Difunto, and Barboza defeated Esfinge, Xelhua, and Valiente Jr. 2–1	Two out of three falls trios match	25:03
5	El Sky Team (Mascara Dorada and Neón) defeated Flip Gordon and Capitán Suicida by pinfall	Tag team match	11:38
6	Claudio Castagnoli defeated Atlantis Jr.	Singles match	14:34
7	Mistico and Templario defeated Hechicero and Ángel de Oro 2–1	Two out of three falls tag team match	19:47

=== HOG Culture Clash ===
Culture Clash
- Promotion: House of Glory (HOG)
- Date: April 16, 2026

Pay-per-view chronology
← Previous; SuperClash	Next → Glory at the Globe

No.	Results	Stipulations	Times
1	Ken Broadway defeated Raymond Bright by pinfall	Singles match	9:13
2	Phumi Nkuta defeated Angel Jacquez, Raheem Royal, Kuro, and JJP (with KB Prime), and JJ Doze by pinfall	Six-way scramble	9:48
3	Shotzi Blackheart (c) defeated Charlie by pinfall	Singles match for the HOG Women's Championship	10:31
4	Brody King vs. Zilla Fatu ended in a no contest	Singles match	9:46
5	Daron Richardson (c) defeated Joey Silver by pinfall	Singles match for the HOG Cruiserweight Championship	6:51
6	Bandido defeated Amazing Red by pinfall	Singles match	16:39
7	Charles Mason (c) defeated Michael Oku by technical submission	Singles match for the HOG Heavyweight Championship	18:29
8	The Hardys (Matt Hardy and Jeff Hardy) (c) defeated The Mane Event (Jay Lyon and Midas Black), and The Good Brothers (Doc Gallows and Karl Anderson) by pinfall	Three-way tag team match for the HOG Tag Team Championship	14:06
(c) / – the champion(s) heading into the match

=== TJPW Live in Las Vegas ===
TJPW Live in Las Vegas
- Promotion: Tokyo Joshi Pro-Wrestling (TJPW)
- Date: April 16, 2026

Event chronology
← Previous; Grand Princess	Next → SAJ x TJPW

No.	Results	Stipulations	Times
1	Yuki Kamifuku and Wakana Uehara defeated Toga and Uta Takami by pinfall	Tag team match	10:03
2	Yuki Aino, Raku, and Pom Harajuku defeated Himawari, Shino Suzuki, and Alexis Lee by pinfall	Six woman tag team match	14:36
3	Miyu Yamashita defeated Mizuki and Miu Watanabe by pinfall	Three-way match	14:05
4	Suzume (c) defeated Sakura Hattori by pinfall	Singles match for the International Princess Championship	11:36
5	The IInspiration (Cassie Lee and Jessie McKay) (c) defeated Shoko Nakajima and Hyper Misao by pinfall	Tag team match for the Princess Tag Team Championship	12:59
6	Yuki Arai (c) defeated J-Rod by pinfall	Singles match for the Princess of Princess Championship	11:18
(c) / – the champion(s) heading into the match

=== Maple Leaf Pro Multiverse ===
Multiverse
- Promotion: Maple Leaf Pro Wrestling (MLP)
- Date: April 17, 2026

Pay-per-view chronology
← Previous; Uprising	Next → Northern Rising

=== Stardom American Dream ===
American Dream in Las Vegas
- Promotion: World Wonder Ring Stardom (Stardom)
- Date: April 17, 2026

Event chronology
← Previous; New Blood 30	Next → All Star Grand Queendom
