= List of Tokyo Joshi Pro-Wrestling personnel =

Tokyo Joshi Pro-Wrestling (TJPW) is a Japanese professional wrestling promotion based in Shinjuku, Tokyo, and part of the CyberFight umbrella promotion. TJPW personnel consists of professional wrestlers, ring announcers, referees, and various other positions.

== Personnel ==
=== Wrestlers ===
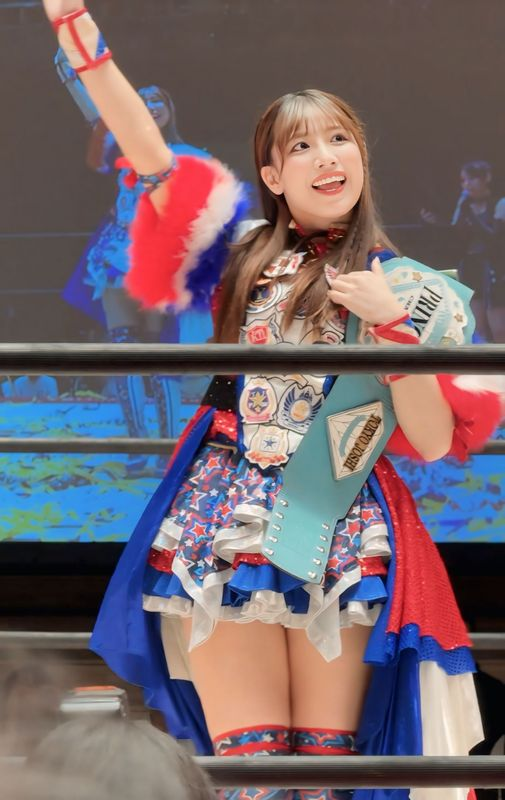
Yuki Arai

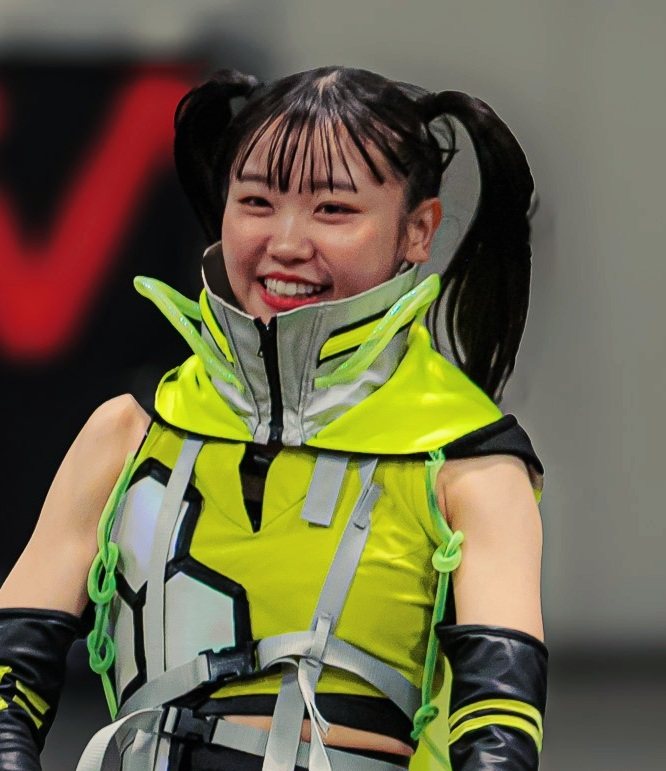
Suzume

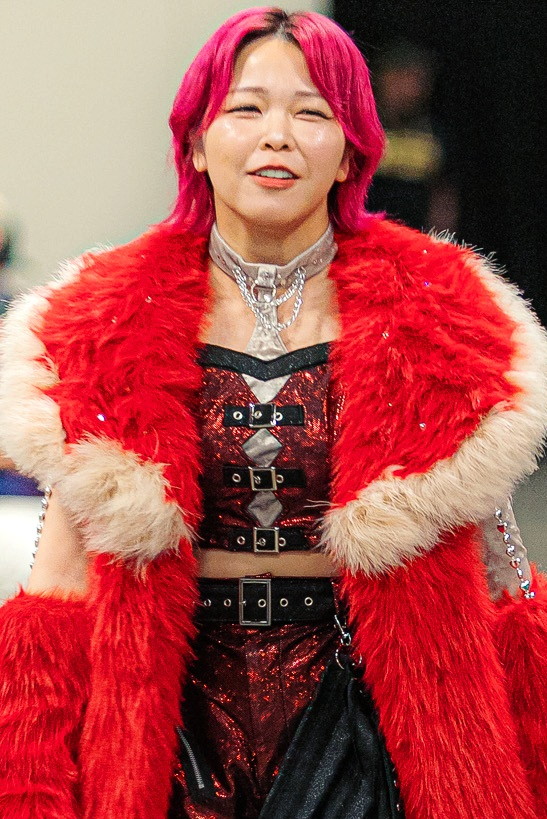
Yuki Aino

Ring name	Real name	Notes
Arisu Endo	Unknown	
Chieri Sakimori	Unknown	
Chika Nanase	Unknown	
Haru Kazashiro	Unknown	Princess Tag Team Champion
Himawari	Himawari Sato	
Hyper Misao	Unknown	
Kira Summer	Unknown	
Mahiro Kiryu	Unknown	
Mifu Ashida	Unknown	
Miu Watanabe	Unknown	Up Up Girls (Pro Wrestling)
Miyu Yamashita	Miyu Yamashita	Pro-Wrestling: EVE International Champion
Mizuki	Mizuki Kaminade	
Momo Sato	Momo Sato	Harajuku LAND
Pom Harajuku	Unknown	
Raku	Unknown	Up Up Girls (Pro-Wrestling)
Ren Konatsu	Unknown	
Rika Tatsumi	Unknown	
Sakura Hattori	Unknown	
Shino Suzuki	Unknown	Up Up Girls (Pro-Wrestling)
Shion Kanzaki	Unknown	
Shoko Nakajima	Shoko Nakajima	SETUP All-Asia Women's Champion
Suzume	Unknown	International Princess Champion
Toga	Unknown	
Uta Takami	Unknown	Up Up Girls (Pro-Wrestling)
Wakana Uehara	Wakana Uehara	One Eight Promotion
Yui Musubi	Unknown	
Yuki Aino	Unknown	Princess Tag Team Champion
Yuki Arai	Yuki Arai	Princess of Princess Champion
Yuki Kamifuku	Yuki Kamifuku	

=== Staff ===
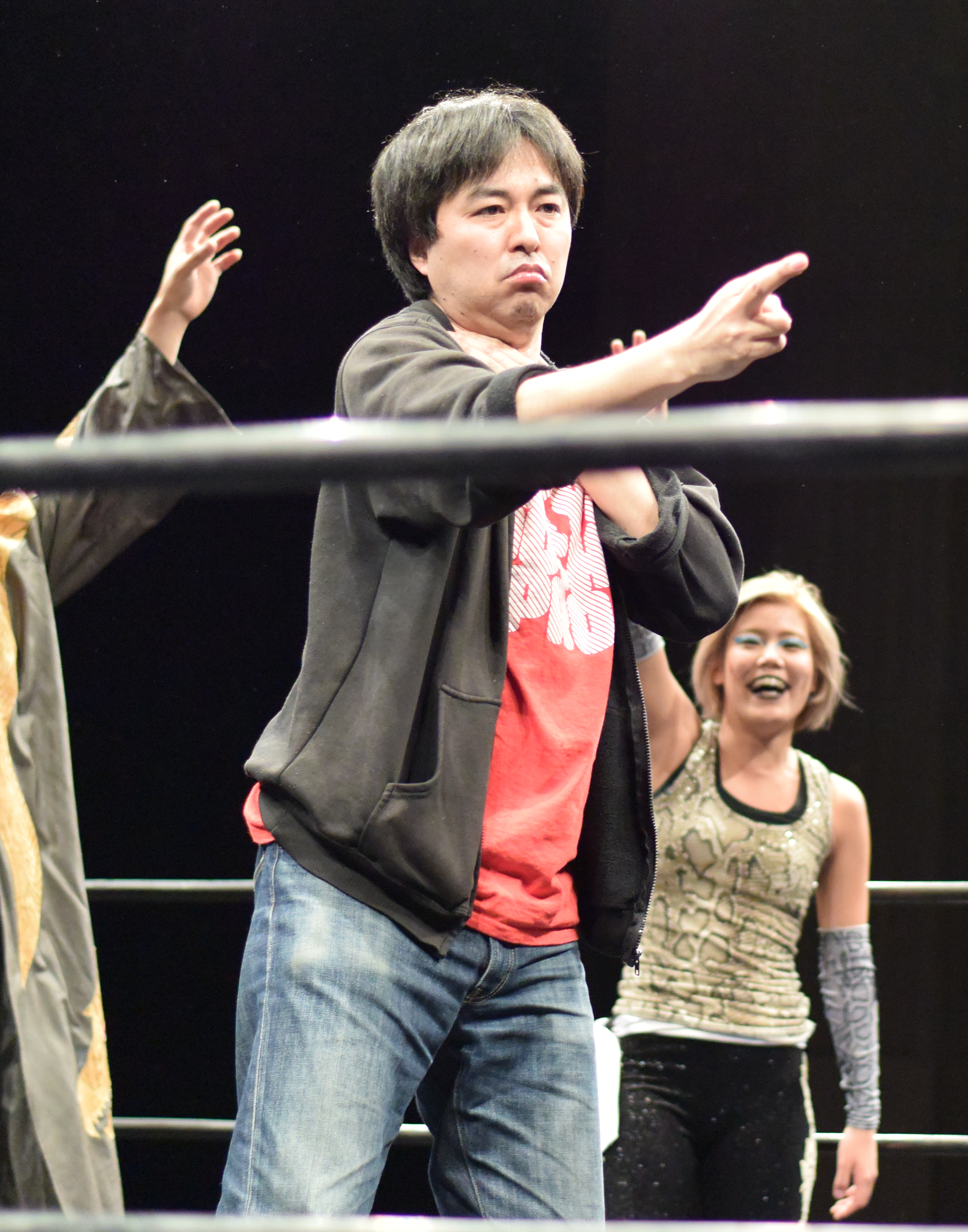
Tetsuya Koda

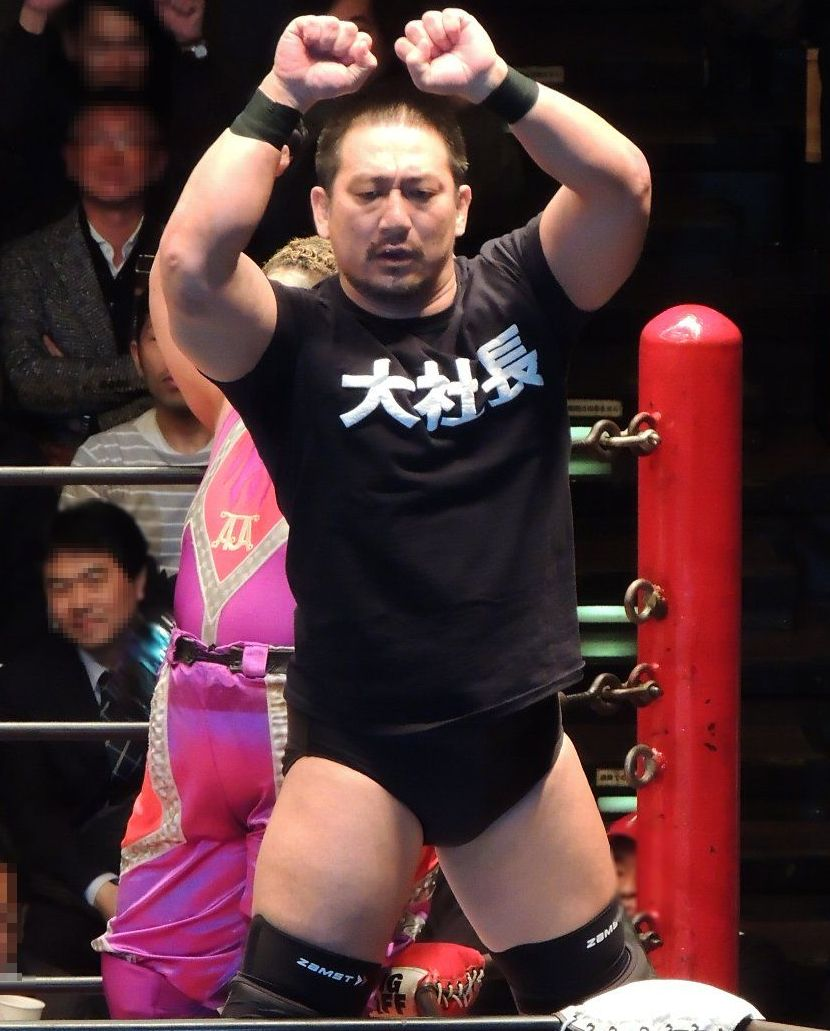
Sanshiro Takagi

Name	Role
Akito	CyberFight Director
Daisuke Kiso	Referee
Fumirin Katsura	Referee
Rise Shirai	Ring announcer
Sanshiro Takagi	CyberFight Vice President
Naomichi Marufuji	CyberFight Vice President
Tetsuya Koda	General Manager
Yasuo Okamoto	CyberFight President
Yukinori Matsui	Referee

== Alumni/notable guests ==
- Aoi Kizuki
- Azusa Takigawa
- Cassie Lee
- Cherry
- Gami
- Haruna Neko
- Hikari Shimizu
- Hiroyo Matsumoto
- Jessie McKay
- Juria Nagano
- Kana
- Lei Ying Lee
- LiLiCo
- Marika Kobashi
- Maho Kurone
- Maki Itoh
- Masha Slamovich
- Mei Suruga
- Meiko Satomura
- Michiko Miyagi
- Mina Shirakawa
- Mirai Maiumi
- Misae Genki
- Miyuki Takase
- Moka Miyamoto
- Natsumi Maki
- Neko Nitta
- Nodoka Tenma
- Priscilla Kelly
- Runa Okubo
- Saki
- Saki Akai
- Saori Anou
- Sareee
- Sayaka Obihiro
- Tanny Mouse
- Unagi Sayaka
- Veny
- Yoshiko Hasegawa
- Yuka Sakazaki
- Yuna Manase
- Yuu
- Yuu Yamagata
- YuuRI

== See also ==
- List of professional wrestling rosters
