= Tiger Jeet Singh =

Indo-Canadian professional wrestler (born 1944)

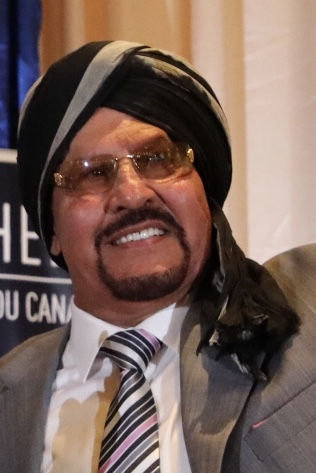
- Tiger Jeet Singh in 2018

Personal information
- Born: Jagjeet Singh Hans; April 3, 1944 (age 82) Sujapur, Punjab, British India
- Spouse: Sukhjit Hans (m. 1970)
- Children: 3, including Tiger Ali Singh

Professional wrestling career
- Ring name: Tiger Jeet Singh
- Billed height: 6 ft 3 in (191 cm)
- Billed weight: 265 lb (120 kg)
- Billed from: Punjab, India
- Trained by: Fred Atkins
- Debut: 1965
- Retired: 2012

Jagjeet Singh Hans (born April 3, 1944) is a Canadian retired professional wrestler, known better by his ring name Tiger Jeet Singh. He was known for his elaborate ring entrances, and generally performed as a heel. He wrestled in Japan and was the first professional wrestler in Japan to defeat sumo wrestler Wajima Hiroshi. He held Frontier Martial-Arts Wrestling's World Martial Arts Heavyweight Championship and headlined the company's flagship event Anniversary Show in 1992.

== Professional wrestling career ==
=== Early career (1965–1973) ===
In the 1960s, Hans began wrestling and emigrated from his hometown in Punjab to Canada, arriving with $6 in his pocket. Hans trained in Toronto under Fred Atkins and eventually signed with Frank Tunney, a Toronto wrestling promoter. Atkins dubbed Hans "Tiger" after witnessing his ferocious style of fighting. Tiger made his Maple Leaf Gardens debut in 1965, wrestling as a heel. His first main event in Toronto was a tag team match late that year, teaming with Professor Hiro to take on the team of Johnny Powers and Sweet Daddy Siki. He began teaming with Fred Atkins in 1966. They became the top team in Toronto by defeating Whipper Billy Watson and Bulldog Brower for the international tag title in July 1966. Singh and Atkins wrestled at or near the top of the card through 1966 and 1967.

Singh also competed on the US wrestling circuits, grappling with opponents like Sweet Daddy Siki, André the Giant, Hans Schmidt, Whipper Billy Watson and "Bulldog" Dick Brower. He defeated Johnny Valentine for the Toronto version of the US title and wrestled Gene Kiniski for the NWA World Heavyweight Championship in the summer of 1967 and, in the fall, twice challenged Bruno Sammartino for the WWWF Championship. With Wild Bull Curry, again defeated Watson and Brower to win the international tag title in 1968.

On February 21, 1971, Singh wrestled The Sheik in the main event in Maple Leaf Gardens history to attract a sell-out crowd of over 18,000. Singh lost to The Sheik by disqualification.

In 1971, he made his debut in Detroit for Big Time Wrestling (Detroit) and feuded with The Sheik.

From 1972 to 1973, Singh worked in Australia for World Championship Wrestling (Australia).

=== Various Promotions (1973-1983) ===
Singh continued working in Toronto and Detroit while under contract with New Japan. During this time he worked in Vancouver, Jim Crockett Promotions, Calgary and Mexico. His last match in Detroit was in 1978 and last match in Toronto in 1983.

=== Japan (1973–2009) ===
==== New Japan Pro-Wrestling (1973–1981) ====
While visiting Japan in 1972, Singh got into a brawl with Antonio Inoki in a shopping center. He immediately began wrestling in New Japan Pro-Wrestling in 1973 and would feud with Inoki as a result of the incident. Inoki broke Singh's arm in a 1974 match, but Tiger defeated Inoki to win the NWF world title in 1975 only to lose it to Inoki three months later.

==== All Japan Pro Wrestling (1981–1990) ====
He defeated Seiji Sakaguchi in 1976 to win the NWF Asian title and remained champion until making a jump to All-Japan Pro Wrestling in 1981. Singh wrestled in the main event of the joint New Japan-All Japan card in Tokyo in 1978 with Abdullah the Butcher to take on the Japanese dream team of Inoki and Giant Baba. Singh would later team with Abdullah frequently.

Singh defeated El Canek to win the UWA World Heavyweight Championship in Mexico in 1980 and lost the title to Inoki months later. Singh regained it but then dropped it back to Canek in 1981. In Toronto Singh had one final match for Frank Tunney against Sheik in 1977, when he subbed for no-show Dusty Rhodes. Singh defeated Ric Flair in Toronto in 1979, and unsuccessfully challenging Nick Bockwinkel for the AWA title at the Gardens.

Singh continued to wrestle in Japan into the 1990s and make occasional appearances on indie shows in Toronto. In 1990, he teamed with Inoki to defeat Big Van Vader and Animal Hamaguchi in the main event of Inoki's 30th anniversary show in Yokohama.

==== Return to New Japan Pro-Wrestling (1991–1995) ====
In the early 1990s, Singh wrestled for New Japan Pro-Wrestling. On December 18, 1991, Singh lost to Hiroshi Hase in match held in the island of Ganryū-jima.

==== Frontier Martial-Arts Wrestling (1992–1994) ====
He ventured to Frontier Martial-Arts Wrestling (FMW) in 1992, and had a bloody feud with Atsushi Onita. Whilst in FMW Singh teamed with hsi son Tiger Jr. and a young Sabu, who also accompanied him to the ring. Singh also wrestled in the main event of the first Heisei Ishingun card in Tokyo in 1994, losing to Shiro Koshinaka in a bout refereed by Inoki.

==== IWA Japan (1995–2003) ====
Singh was a prominent participant in the IWA-Japan 1995 King of the Death Matches Tournament. In the opening contest of the quarter-finals round, he forced Mr. Gannosuke into submission while Gannosuke was inside a bed of barbed wire. Singh advanced to the semi-finals where he lost to Terry Funk. Even after dominating the match and throwing Funk into broken glass, Cactus Jack came out of nowhere and miscalculated an attack with Singh's signature sword on Funk and hit Singh instead. In the finals Singh interfered briefly and joined Cactus Jack in attacking Terry Funk.

==== Hustle (2004, 2007–2009) ====
Singh occasionally wrestled for Japanese promotion Hustle during the 2000s. In July 2008 Singh participated in Hustle's Grand Prix tournament. He represented India and faced Bob Sapp who represented the USA.

==== Return to IWA Japan (2009) ====
After leaving Hustle, Singh returned to IWA Japan wrestling only two matches.

=== World Wrestling Federation (1997) ===
In March 1997, Singh's son Tiger Ali Singh was signed by the WWF and Singh would manage him. He appeared at ringside at WWF's United Kingdom-exclusive pay-per-view event One Night Only on September 20, 1997. Singh left WWF that November when his son was taken off WWF TV.

=== Later career (2009–2012) ===
Singh wrestled his last match on Canada Day 2012 for SCW TigerFest 2012 in Brampton, Ontario where he teamed with Tatanka and Sonjay Dutt defeating Viscera, Darkko, and Steve Corino.

== Personal life ==
Singh and his wife have three sons. One of his sons is former World Wrestling Entertainment (WWE) wrestler Tiger Ali Singh.

A documentary entitled Tiger! chronicles his life story from his life in India to his work as a wrestler.

The Tiger Jeet Singh Public School, an elementary school in Milton, Ontario that opened in September 2010, was named after Singh despite some community concerns about the appropriateness of naming a public school after a professional wrestler. Local author and historian John Challinor II made a presentation to the Halton Board of Education and stressed that the honour should be made based on Tiger Jeet Singh's philanthropy and humanitarian works. Area Trustee Donna Danielli addressed the decision, which has been met with some controversy given the violent content of professional wrestling, stating: "He definitely makes a difference in the community and I believe that he will be a very positive role model and mentor at that school -- he plans to be very involved."

In 2012, Singh was one of the recipients of the Top 25 Canadian Immigrant Awards presented by Canadian Immigrant Magazine.

== Championships and accomplishments ==
- All Japan Pro Wrestling
  - NWA International Tag Team Championship (1 time) - with Umanosuke Ueda
- Frontier Martial-Arts Wrestling
  - FMW Brass Knuckles Heavyweight Championship (1 time)
- International Wrestling Association
  - IWA International Heavyweight Championship (1 time)
- Maple Leaf Wrestling
  - NWA International Tag Team Championship (Toronto version) (2 times) - with Fred Atkins (1) and Bull Curry (1)
  - NWA United States Heavyweight Championship (Toronto version) (1 time)
- New Japan Pro-Wrestling
  - Asia Heavyweight Championship (1 time)
  - Asia Tag Team Championship (1 time) - with Umanosuke Ueda
  - NWA North American Tag Team Championship (Los Angeles/Japan version) (1 time) - with Umanosuke Ueda
  - NWF Heavyweight Championship (1 time)
  - NWF North American Heavyweight Championship (1 time, final)
  - Greatest Gaijin Heel Section (2002)
- NWA All-Star Wrestling
  - NWA Canadian Tag Team Championship (Vancouver version) (1 time) - with Dennis Stamp
- Pro Wrestling Illustrated
  - Ranked No. 274 of the top 500 singles in the "PWI 500" in 1992
  - Ranked No. 383 of the top 500 singles wrestlers during the "PWI Years" in 2003
- Tokyo Sports
  - Match of the Year Award (1979) with Abdullah the Butcher vs. Antonio Inoki and Giant Baba on August 26
- Universal Wrestling Association
  - UWA World Heavyweight Championship (2 times)
- World Championship Wrestling (Australia)
  - IWA World Tag Team Championship (1 time) – with Mr. Fuji
- World Wrestling Association
  - WWA World Martial Arts Championship (1 time)

== Honours ==
- Order of the Rising Sun, 5th Class, Gold and Silver Rays
