= Asia Tag Team Championship =

NJPW professional wrestling championship

Details
- Promotion: New Japan Pro-Wrestling
- Date established: October 4, 1976
- Date retired: April 23, 1981
Statistics
- First champions: Seiji Sakaguchi and Strong Kobayashi
- Final champions: Tiger Jeet Singh and Umanosuke Ueda
- Most reigns: All titleholders (1)
- Longest reign: Tiger Jeet Singh and Umanosuke Ueda (1420 days)
- Shortest reign: Seiji Sakaguchi and Strong Kobayashi (284 days)
- Oldest champion: Umanosuke Ueda (37 years, 25 days)
- Youngest champion: Tiger Jeet Singh (33 years, 103 days)

The Asia Tag Team Championship (アジアタッグ王座, ajiataggu ōza) was a tag team championship established and promoted by New Japan Pro-Wrestling. It was New Japan Pro-Wrestling's version of the All Asia Tag Team Championship. The first champions were Seiji Sakaguchi and Strong Kobayashi, who defeated Tiger Jeet Singh and Gama Singh in a tournament final. The second and final champions were Tiger Jeet Singh and Umanosuke Ueda, who dethroned the previous champions on July 15, 1977. Both tag teams also won the NWA North American Tag Team Championship at some point during their reigns, but the title was defended separately. The title was retired on April 23, 1981, due to an announcement of the IWGP, a new governing body, which would promote their own-branded championships.

== Title history ==
Key
No.	Overall reign number
Reign	Reign number for the specific team—reign numbers for the individuals are in parentheses, if different
Days	Number of days held
Defences	Number of successful defences

No.	Champion	Championship change			Reign statistics			Notes	Ref.
No.	Champion	Date	Event	Location	Reign	Days	Defences	Notes	Ref.
New Japan Pro Wrestling (NJPW)
1	Seiji Sakaguchi and Strong Kobayashi	October 4, 1976	Asia League Tournament	Sendai, Japan	1	284	0	This was a final of the Asia Tag Team League and two out of three falls match, in which Sakaguchi and Kobayashi defeated Tiger Jeet and Gama Singh 2–1 to become the inaugural champions.	
2	Tiger Jeet Singh and Umanosuke Ueda	July 15, 1977	Asia Champion Series	Sapporo, Japan	1	1,420	0	This was two out of three falls match, in which Singh and Ueda won 2–1.	
—	Deactivated	April 23, 1981	—	—	—	—	—	Championship retired after announcement of the IWGP.	
