= Asia Heavyweight Championship =

New Japan Pro-Wrestling championship (1976–1981)

Details
- Promotion: New Japan Pro-Wrestling (NJPW)
- Date established: July 26, 1976
- Date retired: April 23, 1981

Other name(s)
- NWF Asia Heavyweight Championship
Statistics
- First champion(s): Tiger Jeet Singh
- Final champion(s): Tiger Jeet Singh
- Most reigns: Tiger Jeet Singh (1 time)

The Asia Heavyweight Championship (アジアヘビー級王座, ajia hebī-kyū ōza) was a championship established and promoted by New Japan Pro-Wrestling. It was New Japan Pro-Wrestling's version of the All Asia Heavyweight Championship. Tiger Jeet Singh was the first and only champion, winning the title on July 29, 1976 in Osaka, Japan by defeating Seiji Sakaguchi. He successfully defended the title two times, against Seiji Sakaguchi on June 29, 1977 in Osaka and against Strong Kobayashi on July 21, 1977 in Sendai. The title was retired on April 23, 1981 due to an announcement of the IWGP, a new governing body, which would promote their own-branded championships.

== Title history ==
Key
No.	Overall reign number
Reign	Reign number for the specific champion
Days	Number of days held
Defences	Number of successful defences

No.	Champion	Championship change			Reign statistics			Notes	Ref.
No.	Champion	Date	Event	Location	Reign	Days	Defences	Notes	Ref.
New Japan Pro Wrestling (NJPW)
1	Tiger Jeet Singh	July 29, 1976	Asia League Tournament	Osaka, Japan	1	1,771	2	This was a final of the Asia Heavyweight League and two out of three falls match, in which Singh defeated Seiji Sakaguchi 2–1 to become the inaugural champion.	
—	Deactivated	April 23, 1981	—	—	—	—	—	The championship was retired after announcement of the IWGP.	
