= New Japan Pro-Wrestling =

Japanese professional wrestling promotion

New Japan Pro-Wrestling Co., Ltd.
- Trade name: New Japan-Pro Wrestling
- Native name: 新日本プロレスリング株式会社
- Romanized name: Shin Nihon Puroresuringu Kabushiki-gaisha
- Type: Subsidiary
- Industry: Professional wrestling Streaming media
- Predecessor: Japan Pro Wrestling Alliance
- Founded: January 13, 1972; 54 years ago
- Founder: Antonio Inoki
- Headquarters: Kamiōsaki, Shinagawa, Tokyo, Japan
- Area served: Worldwide
- Key people: Naoki Sugabayashi (Chairman); Kaoru Mikumo (Vice Chairman); Hiroshi Tanahashi (President & Representative Director); Hitoshi Matsumoto (Executive Vice President)
- Products: Home video; Live events; Merchandise; Music; Pay-per-view; Publishing; TV; Video on demand
- Services: Licensing
- Revenue: ▲¥5.4 billion (2019)
- Owners: TV Asahi (46.3%); CyberAgent (46.3%); Amuse Inc. (5%)
- Number of employees: 85 (2025)
- Divisions: NJPW Dojo; NJPW World; Team NJPW; Tokon Shop
- Website: sp.njpw.jp (Japanese site); njpw1972.com (English site)

New Japan Pro-Wrestling (新日本プロレスリング株式会社, Shin Nihon Puroresuringu Kabushiki-gaisha) (NJPW), or simply New Japan, is a Japanese professional-wrestling promotion founded on January 13, 1972, by Antonio Inoki, and based in Shinagawa, Tokyo. It is currently a subsidiary of TV Asahi following a share transfer from previous owner Bushiroad to TV Asahi and CyberAgent, which concluded on June 30, 2026. Naoki Sugabayashi has served as the promotion's Chairman since September 2013, while Hiroshi Tanahashi has served as the president of the promotion since December 2023.

Owing to its TV program aired on TV Asahi, NJPW is the largest and longest-running professional wrestling promotion in Japan. Their biggest event is the January 4 Tokyo Dome Show (currently promoted under the Wrestle Kingdom banner) held each year since 1992. In addition to promoting professional wrestling matches, NJPW has also showcased mixed martial arts fights on some of its live events.

The promotion was owned by Yuke's from 2005 until 2012. It was then sold to Bushiroad in 2012, which parlayed its entry to the world of professional wrestling into a best-selling trading card game, King of Pro Wrestling, and appearances from NJPW stars in its various franchises. On May 27, 2026, Bushiroad announced that it would sell its shares to TV Asahi and CyberAgent, with NJPW becoming a subsidiary of TV Asahi.

NJPW was affiliated with the National Wrestling Alliance at various points in its history. NJPW also has and has had agreements with various MMA and professional wrestling promotions around the world; including WWE, World Championship Wrestling, All Elite Wrestling, American Wrestling Association, Total Nonstop Action Wrestling, World Class Championship Wrestling, WAR, Jersey All Pro Wrestling, UWFi, Ring of Honor, World Wonder Ring Stardom, and Pride Fighting Championships.

== History ==
=== Formation and early history (1972–2000) ===
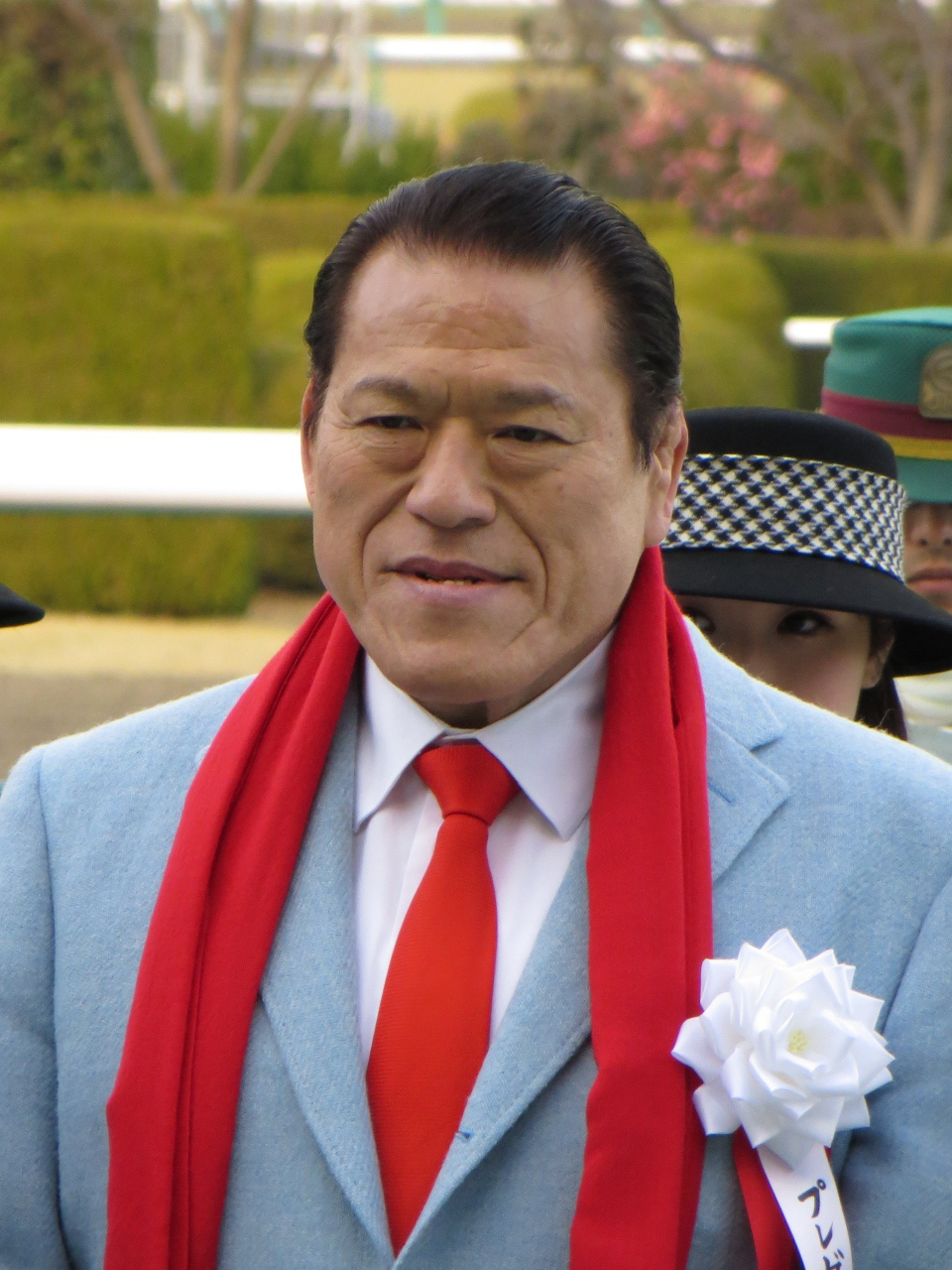
The promotion's founder Antonio Inoki, seen here in 2012.

The promotion was founded by Antonio Inoki on January 13, 1972 after his departure from the Japan Pro Wrestling Alliance promotion. The first NJPW event, titled Opening Series, took place on March 6, 1972, in the Ota Ward Gymnasium in Tokyo, to a crowd of 5,000. The following year, NJPW signed a television deal with NET TV, now known as TV Asahi. The company launched its own governing body, the International Wrestling Grand Prix (IWGP); and in 1983, Hulk Hogan became the first ever IWGP Heavyweight Champion by defeating Inoki. However, this championship was later abandoned and the current version of the championship was established in 1987. Inoki would serve as the president of the promotion until 1989, when he was succeeded by Seiji Sakaguchi.

On April 24, 1989, NJPW hosted Battle Satellite, its first show in the Tokyo Dome. The promotion was a member of the National Wrestling Alliance (NWA) from 1975 to 1985 and once more from 1992 to 1993. NJPW was briefly reaffiliated with the NWA in the late 2000s to the early 2010s as well. On January 4, 1992, NJPW partnered with World Championship Wrestling (WCW) to produce Super Warriors, the first ever January 4 Tokyo Dome Show, an event that would become an annual tradition for NJPW and is considered their biggest event of the year and comparable to WWE's WrestleMania event. In April 1995, NJPW and WCW held the two-day Collision in Korea event at the Rungrado 1st of May Stadium in Pyongyang, North Korea. The event was the first professional wrestling event held in North Korea and holds the record for most attended wrestling event of all time, with 355,000 people packing the stadium over the two days.

=== Decline and Inoki's departure (2000–2011) ===
In the early 2000s, the burgeoning popularity of mixed martial arts (MMA) in Japan was noticed by Inoki, who wanted to integrate elements of shoot wrestling to make the company appear more realistic. The company would partner with martial arts organization K-1 and begin to insert wrestlers into MMA fights, with the goal of pushing NJPW in a more realistic direction and to make it appear as an actual sport. The company's new management was criticized by critics and fans. Inoki later departed NJPW in 2005 after selling his share of the company to Yuke's, and began his own promotion, the Inoki Genome Federation (IGF), in 2007. After his departure, Inoki's son-in-law Simon took over the company, before Naoki Sugabayashi was appointed president in 2007 after Simon also left NJPW to join Antonio in IGF. After the departure of the Inoki family, the company began to reintegrate its prior puroresu style of wrestling.

Also in 2007, NJPW hosted its first ever pay-per-view (PPV) event Wrestle Kingdom I.

The promotion debuted a new series called NEVER in August 2010, designed to be a series of events spotlighting younger up-and-coming New Japan talent and feature more outsider participation in the promotion. On January 4, 2011, New Japan officially announced the NJPW Invasion Tour 2011: Attack on East Coast, the promotion's first tour of the United States to be held in May 2011. The tour featured shows in Rahway, New Jersey on May 13, New York City on May 14 and Philadelphia, Pennsylvania on May 15, as well as cross-promotion with American independent group Jersey All Pro Wrestling (JAPW). As part of the tour, NJPW introduced a new title, the IWGP Intercontinental Championship.

=== Acquisition by Bushiroad and expansion (2012–2020) ===
On January 31, 2012, Yuke's announced that it had sold all shares of New Japan Pro-Wrestling to card game company Bushiroad for ¥500 million ($6.5 million).

New Japan aired its first internet pay-per-view, the fourth day of the 2012 G1 Climax, on August 5, 2012. The October 8, 2012, King of Pro-Wrestling pay-per-view marked the first time viewers outside Japan were able to order a pay-per-view by the promotion through Ustream. On October 5, 2012, New Japan announced the creation of the NEVER Openweight Championship, which would be contested for on the NEVER series. A two-day tournament to determine the inaugural champion was held between November 15 and 19, 2012. The final NEVER event was held in November 2012.

In February 2014, New Japan announced a partnership with Ring of Honor (ROH), which saw the promotion return to North America the following May to present two supershows; Global Wars in Toronto and War of the Worlds in New York City. During the tour, New Japan wrestlers also took part in an event held by Canadian promotion Border City Wrestling (BCW). A year later, NJPW and ROH announced another tour together to produce four more supershows; War of the Worlds '15 on May 12 and 13 in Philadelphia and Global Wars '15 on May 15 and 16 in Toronto.

In June 2014, New Japan announced a partnership with the new American Global Force Wrestling (GFW) organization helmed by Jeff Jarrett. In November 2014, GFW announced that it would be broadcasting NJPW's Wrestle Kingdom 9 in Tokyo Dome on pay-per-view in the United States as a four-hour event. Also in November 2014, the American AXS TV network announced it had acquired rights to rebroadcast a series of thirteen episodes of NJPW matches from TV Asahi. The series premiered on January 16, 2015, airing weekly on Fridays. Averaging 200,000 viewers per episode, the show was considered a success, leading to AXS TV and TV Asahi signing a multi-year deal to continue airing the show. In June 2016, the show was also acquired by the Canadian Fight Network. On December 1, 2014, NJPW and TV Asahi announced NJPW World, a new worldwide streaming site for the promotion's events.

On July 18, 2015, NJPW announced the "New IWGP Conception", a global expansion strategy centered on their international partnerships with Consejo Mundial de Lucha Libre (CMLL), GFW, ROH, Revolution Pro Wrestling (RPW), Westside Xtreme Wrestling (wXw), and the National Wrestling Alliance (NWA) as well as holding more shows in Thailand, Singapore, and Taiwan. Also announced was the Lion's Gate Project, which would feature NJPW rookies as well as up-and-coming outsiders working trial matches in an effort to earn a spot in the promotion. Finally, it was announced that there were plans to take the company public with a listing on the stock market within three to five years.

On December 21, 2015, NJPW announced the creation of its seventh active title and the first six-man tag team championship in the promotion's history, the NEVER Openweight 6-Man Tag Team Championship. On January 5, 2016, NJPW announced a partnership with the Amuse talent agency with the goal of making the promotion's wrestlers internationally recognized stars in the vein of Dwayne "The Rock" Johnson.

In March 2017, NJPW partnered with the New Zealand-based Fale Dojo, a pro wrestling training facility run by NJPW performer Bad Luck Fale. NJPW will utilize the partnership as an opportunity to scout talent from Oceania. The following month on April 24, 2017, it was announced that NJPW would co-present the Japanese qualifiers for the Pro Wrestling World Cup tournament hosted by the British What Culture Pro Wrestling (WCPW) promotion.

On May 12, 2017, NJPW announced the creation of a new title: the IWGP United States Heavyweight Championship, with the inaugural champion to be crowned during the promotion's G1 Special in USA shows in Long Beach, California on July 1 and 2. Four days later, NJPW held a press conference to announce plans to establish a subsidiary company, including a dojo, in the United States. A Los Angeles office was scheduled to be opened before the end of 2017, with a dojo scheduled to be opened at the start of 2018. NJPW's second American event, Strong Style Evolved, took place on March 25, 2018, also in Long Beach. In November 2017, NJPW signed a television deal with Discovery Communications, which would see the company's programming brought to 70 million Indian homes through DSport.

In January 2018, NJPW announced the four-show Fallout Down Under tour, the promotion's inaugural tour of Australia spanning from February 16–19. In March 2018, New Japan opened the NJPW LA Dojo with Katsuyori Shibata serving as head trainer and ROH wrestler Scorpio Sky serving as assistant trainer. On May 13, 2018, New Japan hired its first foreign president, Dutch businessman Harold Meij.

In February 2019, NJPW re-established their partnership with the NWA and entered into a new partnership with The Crash Lucha Libre; both partnerships ended later in 2019. On October 21, 2019, NJPW announced the formation of a new American subsidiary of the company, named New Japan Pro-Wrestling of America (NJoA). In 2019, they had run a record 13 shows in the United States, with plans to run double that in 2020. It was reported at the same time that NJPW and ROH had no joint shows planned for the future.

On October 31, 2019, Super7 announced the first line of NJPW action figures.

=== Impact of the COVID-19 pandemic (2020–2022) ===
Amidst from the Japanese onset of the COVID-19 pandemic, in accordance with recommendations from the Japanese Ministry of Health, NJPW decided to cancel all scheduled shows from March 1 through March 15. On March 10, NJPW announced that they were cancelling all shows through March 22, which meant that they cancelled the 2020 New Japan Cup as well. World Wonder Ring Stardom is owned by Bushiroad, also made adjustments to their schedule, cancelling shows from February 18 to March 14. Their March 8 show in Korakuen Hall was held without any spectators in attendance, instead streaming live on their YouTube channel. On March 23, NJPW would later cancel the 2020 Sakura Genesis event that was originally scheduled to take place in on March 31.

On April 8, NJPW would cancel more events from April 11 through May 4, which mean both nights of 2020 Wrestling Dontaku were cancelled as well. On May 6, NJPW cancelled their annual Best of the Super Juniors tournament. The next day, NJPW postponed their Wrestle Dynasty event to 2021, which was to take place in Madison Square Garden in New York. On June 9, NJPW announced their return with special show with mystery match card called Together Special on June 15 and the return of the New Japan Cup would now be held from June 16 until July 11, with the final being held at Osaka-jō Hall in Osaka alongside Dominion in Osaka-jo Hall being rescheduled to July 12.

NJPW 50th Anniversary logo, introduced in late 2021 to celebrate the milestone

On September 29, NJPW announced that Meij would no longer be appointed president of the promotion and was replaced by Takami Ohbari on October 23, who is the current CEO of New Japan Pro-Wrestling of America.

In 2020, NJPW partnered with Game Changer Wrestling (GCW) and Major League Wrestling (MLW), with both promotions sending wrestlers to the Super J-Cup tournament. On July 31, NJPW announced a new weekly series titled NJPW Strong, with its initial episodes to feature matches from the inaugural New Japan Cup USA tournament. As part of NJPW's expansion into the United States, the series would be produced by NJoA. In February 2021, it was reported that NJPW had entered into partnerships with All Elite Wrestling (AEW) and Impact Wrestling. On November 19, 2021, NJPW would re-establish a relationship with Pro Wrestling Noah with Noah wrestlers being involved at the third night of NJPW's Wrestle Kingdom 16 event.

During Wrestle Kingdom 16 in January 2022, it was announced that NJPW programming, including new programs and reruns of past English broadcasts, would return to AXS TV and Fight Network in the United States and Canada. Reruns will begin airing on AXS starting January 20, with all new content to premiere on March 3. On the April 20, 2022 episode of AEW Dynamite, it was announced that New Japan and AEW would co-promote a supershow called AEW x NJPW: Forbidden Door. The event would take place on June 26, 2022, at the United Center in Chicago, Illinois.

During September 2022, NJPW announced NJPW Tamashii, an Oceania-based brand that would stage events throughout the region.

=== Post-COVID and new partnerships (2022–2026) ===
On October 1, 2022, NJPW's founder Antonio Inoki died from systemic transthyretin amyloidosis at age 79. On January 4, 2023, NJPW held their Wrestle Kingdom 17 event in Inoki's honor.

In October 2023, NJPW and sister promotion World Wonder Ring Stardom established the Asia Pacific Pro-Wrestling Alliance, an interpromotional governing body that seeks to connect wrestling promotions across Asia. On January 5, 2024, the alliance was renamed the Asia-Pacific Federation of Wrestling (APFW). The inaugural event sanctioned by APFW, NJPW's Wrestling World in Taiwan, took place on April 14 in Taipei.

In early December 2023, NJPW was announced as a founding member of the United Japan Pro-Wrestling (UJPW) alliance. The inaugural UJPW event took place on May 6, 2024, in the Nippon Budokan arena. On December 23, NJPW announced that Takami Ohbari had stepped down as the promotion's president, with Hiroshi Tanahashi replacing him as NJPW president and representative director.

On April 23, 2024, NJPW announced that it would fully acquire sister promotion World Wonder Ring Stardom on June 28. The acquisition was completed on June 28, with Stardom Co., Ltd. becoming a subsidiary of NJPW.

=== Acquisition by TV Asahi and CyberAgent (2026–present) ===
On May 27, 2026, Bushiroad announced that it would sell its NJPW shares to CyberAgent and previous minority shareholder TV Asahi. As a result of this sale NJPW would become a subsidiary of TV Asahi. Of Bushiroad's 10,500,400 shares (70%), 3,550,200 shares are being transferred to TV Asahi and 6,950,200 shares are being transferred to CyberAgent. This increases TV Asahi previous stake from 3,400,000 to 6,950,200 shares. The sale concluded on June 30, 2026.

On November 6, 2026, NJPW announced that New Japan Pro-Wrestling of America will cease operations and enter liquidation. TV Asahi will be taking over production of future North America shows.

== Contracts ==
Up until the 1980s, NJPW signed its workers to multi-year contracts, before changing to a system where the promotion signed its wrestlers to one-year deals that expired at the end of every January. Following the departures of A.J. Styles and Shinsuke Nakamura, NJPW chairman Takaaki Kidani announced in February 2016 that the promotion was returning to the multi-year contract system. The contracts forbid negotiations with other promotions. After All Elite Wrestling (AEW) was launched by wrestlers working for NJPW, they started signing foreigners to guaranteed deals as well. Any side contracts or agreements offered to wrestlers under NJPW contracts, need the promotion's approval before being signed. NJPW currently has partnerships with several promotions across the world, for which NJPW wrestlers can also perform for.

NJPW partnerships
| Promotion | Country |
|---|---|
| All Elite Wrestling (AEW) | United States |
| All Japan Pro Wrestling (AJPW) | Japan |
| Big Japan Pro Wrestling (BJW) | Japan |
| Brazilian Wrestling Federation (BWF) | Brazil |
| Consejo Mundial de Lucha Libre (CMLL) | Mexico |
| Costa Rica Wrestling Embassy (CWE) | Costa Rica |
| DDT Pro-Wrestling (DDT) | Japan |
| Dragongate Japan Pro-Wrestling (Dragongate) | Japan |
| Dragon Fighting Wrestling (DFW) | China |
| Ganbare☆Pro-Wrestling (GanPro) | Japan |
| Grapplemax Pro Wrestling Studios (Grapplemax) | Singapore |
| Kyushu Pro-Wrestling (KPW) | Japan |
| Major League Wrestling (MLW) | United States |
| Pro-Wrestling Dradition (Dradition) | Japan |
| Pro Wrestling Freedoms (Freedoms) | Japan |
| Pro Wrestling Noah (Noah) | Japan |
| Pro Wrestling Wave (Wave) | Japan |
| Puzzle | Taiwan |
| Revolution Pro Wrestling (RPW) | United Kingdom |
| Ring of Honor (ROH) | United States |
| Setup Thailand Pro Wrestling (Setup) | Thailand |
| Tokyo Joshi Pro-Wrestling (TJPW) | Japan |
| World Woman Pro-Wrestling Diana (Diana) | Japan |
| World Wonder Ring Stardom (Stardom) | Japan |

== Championships and accomplishments ==
The promotion has its own fictional governing body, the International Wrestling Grand Prix, shortened as IWGP.

At the top of NJPW's championship hierarchy for male wrestlers is the IWGP Heavyweight Championship. Secondary titles include the IWGP Global Heavyweight Championship, the NEVER Openweight Championship, the NJPW World Television Championship, and for wrestlers in New Japan's United States based NJPW Strong brand, there is the Strong Openweight Championship

For tag teams, there are three traditional championship for two-man teams (the IWGP Tag Team Championship, the Strong Openweight Tag Team Championship, and the Tamashii Tag Team Championship, which is exclusively defended on NJPW Tamashii shows) and one for three-man teams (the NEVER Openweight 6-Man Tag Team Championship).

There are two championships in NJPW for junior heavyweight wrestlers - a singles title (the IWGP Junior Heavyweight Championship) and one for tag teams (the IWGP Junior Heavyweight Tag Team Championship).

There are two championships for female wrestlers performing in NJPW, the IWGP Women's Championship and the Strong Women's Championship (the latter for wrestlers in NJPW Strong).

=== Current championships ===
As of November 22, 2026.

=== Men's division ===
==== Singles ====
| Championship | Current champion(s) | Reign | Date won | Days held | Successful defenses | Location | Notes | Ref. |
|---|---|---|---|---|---|---|---|---|
| IWGP Heavyweight Championship | Yota Tsuji | 2 | June 14, 2026 | 161 | 1 | Osaka, Japan | Defeated Callum Newman at Dominion 6.14 in Osaka-jo Hall. | |
| IWGP Global Heavyweight Championship | Gabe Kidd | 2 | July 6, 2026 | 139 | 1 | Tokyo, Japan | Defeated Shota Umino at Road to G1 Climax: Night 6 | |
| IWGP Junior Heavyweight Championship | Yoh | 1 | June 14, 2026 | 161 | 1 | Osaka, Japan | Defeated Douki at Dominion 6.14 in Osaka-jo Hall. | |
| NEVER Openweight Championship | Aaron Wolfey | 2 | June 14, 2026 | 161 | 0 | Osaka, Japan | Defeated Ren Narita at Dominion 6.14 in Osaka-jo Hall. | |
| Strong Openweight Championship | Boltin Oleg | 1 | February 27, 2026 | 268 | 0 | Trenton, New Jersey | Defeated Tomohiro Ishii at The New Beginning USA | |
| NJPW World Television Championship | Toru Yano | 1 | November 19, 2026 | 1 | 0 | Tokyo, Japan | Defeated Shun Skywalker at Tanahashi Jam 2. | |
| NJPW TAMASHII Openweight Championship | Don Fale | 1 | October 10, 2026 | 190 | Auckland, New Zealand | Defeated Johnny Recon and Trent Hooper on Tamashii. | | |

==== Tag team ====
| Championship | Current champion(s) | Reign | Date won | Days held | Successful defenses | Location | Notes | Ref. |
|---|---|---|---|---|---|---|---|---|
| IWGP Tag Team Championship | Knock Out Brothers (Yuto-Ice and Oskar) | 2 | October 6, 2026 | 47 | 0 | Tokyo, Japan | Defeated United Empire (Henare and Great-O-Khan) of Night 1 of Road to King of Pro-Wrestling. | |
| IWGP Junior Heavyweight Tag Team Championship | El Desperado and Místico | 1 (5, 1) | May 4, 2026 | 202 | 1 | Fukuoka, Japan | Defeated Ichiban Sweet Boys (Robbie Eagles and Kosei Fujita) on Night 2 of Wrestling Dontaku. | |
| Strong Openweight Tag Team Championship | Unbound Co. (Taiji Ishimori & Titan) | 1 | November 16, 2026 | 6 | 2 | Mexico City, Mexico | Defeated United Empire (TJP and Templario) at CMLL Viernes Espectacular. | |
| NEVER Openweight 6-Man Tag Team Championship | Unbound Co. (Yuto-Ice, Oskar, and Jeff Cobb) | 1 | October 12, 2026 | 41 | 0 | Tokyo, Japan | Defeated United Empire (Will Ospreay, Henare, and Great-O-Khan) at King of Pro-Wrestling. | |
| NJPW TAMASHII Tag Team Championship | Ungrateful 1s (T.J. Illes and Trent Hooper) | 1 | May 16, 2026 | 190 | 0 | Auckland, New Zealand | Defeated The Pretty Boys (Magic Mark and Pretty Richie) on Tamashii. | |

=== Women's division ===
| Championship | Current champion(s) | Reign | Date won | Days held | Successful defenses | Location | Notes | Ref. |
|---|---|---|---|---|---|---|---|---|
| IWGP Women's Championship | Syuri | 2 | October 13, 2025 | 405 | 5 | Tokyo, Japan | Defeated Sareee at King of Pro-Wrestling. | |
| Strong Women's Championship | Alex Windsor | 1 | March 8, 2026 | 259 | 1 | London, England | Defeated Syuri at Wrestle Queendom VIII. This was a Pro-Wrestling: EVE event. | |

=== Defunct championships ===
| Championship | Last champion(s) | Reign | Date retired | Notes |
|---|---|---|---|---|
| IWGP Intercontinental Championship | Yota Tsuji | 1 | January 6, 2026 | Retired after it was split from the IWGP World Heavyweight Championship and the IWGP Heavyweight Championship reinstated. |
| IWGP Third Belt Championship | Shinsuke Nakamura | 1 | February 17, 2008 | Unified with the IWGP Heavyweight Championship after Nakamura defeated the previous champion Kurt Angle. |
| IWGP U-30 Openweight Championship | Hiroshi Tanahashi | 2 | June 7, 2006 | The championship could only be won by wrestlers under the age of 30. Vacated by Tanahashi at the age of 29 and soon after deactivated. |
| IWGP United States Heavyweight Championship | Will Ospreay | 2 | December 11, 2023 | The championship was deactivated and replaced by IWGP Global Heavyweight Championship. |
| KOPW | Great-O-Khan | 1 | December 22, 2024 | The championship was retired and deactivated by official 2024 champion Great-O-Khan. |
| NWF Heavyweight Championship | Shinsuke Nakamura | 1 | January 4, 2004 | Unified with the IWGP Heavyweight Championship after Nakamura defeated the previous champion Yoshihiro Takayama. |
| J-Crown Octuple Unified Championship | Shinjiro Otani | 1 | November 5, 1997 | The championship resulted from the unification of eight lower-weight class titles from several different wrestling promotions. The championship was retired at the request of the WWF, who was introducing their own version of the WWF Light Heavyweight Championship (which was one of the component championships of the J-Crown). |
| Greatest 18 Club Championship | The Great Muta | 1 | August 16, 1992 | Muta retired championship, in order to focus on his IWGP Heavyweight Championship title defenses. |
| WWF World Martial Arts Heavyweight Championship | Antonio Inoki | 2 | December 31, 1989 | The championship was contested in matches billed as shoot wrestling fights. Abandoned for undocumented reasons. |
| IWGP Heavyweight Championship (original version) | Antonio Inoki | 2 | May 11, 1987 | The championship was deactivated and replaced by the new IWGP Heavyweight Championship, which was first awarded to the winner of the 1987 IWGP League. |
| WWF International Heavyweight Championship | Tatsumi Fujinami | 3 | October 31, 1985 | Abandoned after the NJPW and the WWF ended their working relationship. |
| WWF International Tag Team Championship | Kengo Kimura and Tatsumi Fujinami | 1 (1, 1) | October 31, 1985 | Abandoned after the NJPW and the WWF ended their working relationship. |
| WWF Junior Heavyweight Championship | The Cobra | 2 | October 31, 1985 | Abandoned after the NJPW and the WWF ended their working relationship. |
| Asia Heavyweight Championship | Tiger Jeet Singh | 1 | April 23, 1981 | Championship retired after announcement of the IWGP, a new governing body, which would promote their own-branded championships. |
| Asia Tag Team Championship | Tiger Jeet Singh and Umanosuke Ueda | 1 | April 23, 1981 | Championship retired after announcement of the IWGP, a new governing body, which would promote their own-branded championships. |
| NWF Heavyweight Championship (original version) | Antonio Inoki | 1 | April 23, 1981 | Championship retired after announcement of the IWGP, a new governing body, which would promote their own-branded championships. |
| NWF North American Championship | Tiger Jeet Singh | 1 | April 23, 1981 | Championship retired after announcement of the IWGP, a new governing body, which would promote their own-branded championships. |
| NWA North American Tag Team Championship (Los Angeles/Japan version) | Riki Choshu and Seiji Sakaguchi | 1 (1, 5) | April 23, 1981 | Championship retired after announcement of the IWGP, a new governing body, which would promote their own-branded championships. |
| WWF North American Heavyweight Championship | Seiji Sakaguchi | 1 | April 23, 1981 | Championship retired after announcement of the IWGP, a new governing body, which would promote their own-branded championships. |
| Real World Championship | Karl Gotch | 2 | 1972 | Abandoned for undocumented reasons. |

== Events ==
=== Marquee events ===
- Wrestle Kingdom
- New Year Dash!!
- The New Beginning
- NJPW Anniversary Show
- Sakura Genesis
- Wrestling Dontaku
- Dominion
- Destruction
- King of Pro-Wrestling
- Power Struggle

=== International events ===
- Strong Style Evolved
- Fighting Spirit Unleashed
- Royal Quest
- Resurgence
- Battle in the Valley
- Windy City Riot
- Capital Collision

=== Collaborated events ===
- Fantastica Mania (with CMLL)
- All Together (with UJPW)
- Forbidden Door (with AEW)
- Historic X-Over (with Stardom)
- Wrestle Dynasty (with AEW, CMLL, Stardom and Ring of Honor)

=== Tournaments ===
==== Active ====
| Tournament | Latest winner(s) | Date won | Location | Notes |
|---|---|---|---|---|
| G1 Climax | Ryohei Oiwa | August 16, 2026 | Tokyo | Defeated Yuya Uemura in the tournament final. |
| World Tag League | TMDK (Zack Sabre Jr. and Ryohei Oiwa) | December 14, 2025 | Mashiki, Kumamoto | Defeated Gabe Kidd and Yota Tsuji in the tournament final. |
| New Japan Cup | Callum Newman | March 21, 2026 | Nagaoka | Defeated Yuya Uemura in the tournament final. |
| Best of the Super Juniors | Yoh | June 7, 2026 | Ōta, Tokyo | Defeated Kosei Fujita in the tournament final. |
| Super Junior Tag League (Note: NJPW has previously held other round-robin tournaments for junior heavyweight tag teams: the Junior Heavyweight Super Grade Tag League in 1996, won by Eddie Guerrero as Black Tiger II and The Great Sasuke; the G1 Junior Tag League in 2001, won by El Samurai and Jyushin Thunder Liger; and the Super J Tag League on November 13, 2010, won by Jado and Gedo.) | House of Torture (Douki and Sho) | November 2, 2025 | Gifu | Defeated Bullet Club War Dogs (Taiji Ishimori and Robbie X) in the tournament final. |
| Young Lion Cup (Note: NJPW held the Karl Gotch Cup between 1974 and 1976, a similar style rookie wrestler tournament. In 1989, 1991 and 2002, NJPW held tournaments under the name Young Lion Tournament, which are not considered part of the Young Lion Cup lineage.) | Katsuya Murashima | February 1, 2026 | Bunkyō, Tokyo | Defeated Shoma Kato in the tournament final. |
| Oceania Cup | Jack Bonza | November 15, 2024 | Auckland | Defeated PunchDrunk Istria in the last block match. |
| NJPW Academy Cup | Allan Breeze | March 21, 2025 | Carson, California | Defeated Raymond Bright in the Finals match. |

==== Inactive ====
| Tournament | Last winner(s) | Last held | Type | Created | Notes |
|---|---|---|---|---|---|
| New Japan Cup USA | Tom Lawlor | 2021 | Openweight | 2020 | A spin-off of the New Japan Cup tournament, held in 2020 and 2021. |
| Super J-Cup | El Phantasmo | 2020 | Junior heavyweight | 1994 | A tournament for junior heavyweight wrestlers. |
| Lion's Break Crown | Clark Connors | 2020 | Openweight | 2020 | A single-elimination singles tournament, held in 2020. |
| J Sports Crown Openweight 6-Man Tag Tournament | Apollo 555 (Hirooki Goto, Prince Devitt and Ryusuke Taguchi) | 2011 | Openweight six-man tag team | 2010 | A single-elimination six-man tag team tournament, held in 2010 and 2011. |
| G2 U-30 Climax | Hiroshi Tanahashi | 2005 | Openweight | 2003 | A tournament for wrestlers under the age of 30, held in 2003 and 2005. |

== Halls of Fame ==
=== Greatest 18 Club ===
The Greatest 18 Club was New Japan's first hall of fame, being established in September 30 during Antonio Inoki's career 30th anniversary in 1990. Additionally, Lou Thesz also debuted a new Greatest 18 Club Championship, awarding it to Riki Choshu.

==== Inductees ====
| Ring name (Birth name) | Accolades |
|---|---|
| Lou Thesz (Aloysius Thesz) | Considered to be one of the greatest wrestlers of all time. He was a three-time NWA World Heavyweight Champion, three-time NWA World Heavyweight Champion and a two-time World Heavyweight Wrestling Champion. In Japan, he helped train young Japanese talents. |
| Karl Gotch (Charles Istaz) | Inaugural and two-time Real World Champion. Wrestled Antonio Inoki in the main event of the very first show in NJPW. Helped training young Japanese talents. |
| André the Giant (André Roussimoff) | Winner of the 1981 MSG Tag League, 1982 MSG Series and 1985 IWGP League and the Sagawa Express Cup. |
| Dusty Rhodes (Note: Originally Tiger Jeet Singh was inducted in this place. However he was later expelled and replaced with Dusty Rhodes.) (Virgil Runnels Jr.) | Three-time NWA World Heavyweight Champion and one-time NWF World Tag Team Champion. Participated in several NJPW tournaments. |
| Stan Hansen (John Hansen) | One-time NWF Heavyweight Championship. |
| Wim Ruska (Willem Ruska) | Professional wrestler and a judoka, only athlete to win two gold medals in Judo in one Olympics. |
| Billy Robinson (William Robinson) | Two-time IWA World Heavyweight Champion, one-time NWA United National Championship and PWF World Heavyweight Champion. Helped training young Japanese talents. |
| Hiro Matsuda (Yasuhiro Kojima) | Two-time NWA World Junior Heavyweight Champion and one-time NWA North American Tag Team Champion. |
| Bob Backlund (Robert Blacklund) | Two-time WWWF Heavyweight Champion, and one-time WWF Tag Team Champion. |
| Verne Gagne (Laverne Gagne) | Ten-time AWA World Heavyweight Champion, four-time AWA World Tag Team Champion and one-time IWA World Heavyweight Champion. |
| Strong Kobayashi (Shozo Kobayashi) | Two-time NWA North American Tag Team Champion. |
| Hulk Hogan (Terry Bollea) | First original IWGP Heavyweight Champion, winner of 1982 and 1983 MSG Tag Leagues and 1983 IWGP Leagues. In America he was also six-time WWF Heavyweight/WWE Undisputed Champion and six-time WCW World Heavyweight Champion. |
| Muhammad Ali (Cassius Marcellus Clay Jr.) | Considered to be one of the greatest professional boxers of all time. Three-time heavyweight lineal champion. Fought Antonio Inoki in a wrestler vs. boxer match. |
| Seiji Sakaguchi | Four-time NWA North American Tag Team Champion, one-time NWF North American Heavyweight Champion and WWF North American Heavyweight Champion. |
| Nick Bockwinkel (Nicholas Warren Francis Bockwinkel) | Four-time AWA World Heavyweight Champion, three-time AWA World Tag Team Champion and one-time AWA Southern Heavyweight Champion. |
| Johnny Powers (Dennis Waters) | One-time NWF Heavyweight Champion, one-time NWF North American Heavyweight Champion and one-time NWA North American Tag Team Champion (Los Angeles-Japan Version). |
| Johnny Valentine (John Theodore Wisniski) | Five-time WWWF United States Television Champion, four-time WWWF United States Tag Team Champion, one-time NWA United States Heavyweight Champion, three-time NWA Mid-Atlantic Heavyweight Champion, one-time NWA World Tag Team Champion (Minneapolis Version), one time NWA International Tag Team Champion and one-time NWA United National Champion. |
| Antonio Inoki (Kanji Inoki) | NJPW founder and first IWGP Heavyweight Champion. Also won many top titles, including the WWF World Martial Arts Heavyweight Championship, NWA United National Championship and NWF Heavyweight Championship. |

=== Greatest Wrestlers ===
The Greatest Wrestlers is New Japan's hall of fame, established in 2007 to honor wrestlers who have wrestled for the promotion. From 2007 to 2011, the inductions begin on March 6, the anniversary of the promotion's founding.

==== Inductees ====
| Year | Ring name (Birth name) | Accolades |
|---|---|---|
| 2007 | Antonio Inoki (Kanji Inoki) | NJPW founder and first IWGP Heavyweight Champion. Also won many top titles, including the WWF World Martial Arts Heavyweight Championship, NWA United National Championship and NWF Heavyweight Championship. |
| 2007 | Seiji Sakaguchi | Three-time NWA North American Tag Team Champion and one-time NWF North American Heavyweight and WWF North American Heavyweight Champion. |
| 2007 | Kantaro Hoshino (Tatsuo Hoshino) | One-time IWA World Tag Team Champion with Kotetsu Yamamoto as the Yamaha Brothers. Also known as a promoter and manager. |
| 2007 | Kotetsu Yamamoto (Masaru Yamamoto) | One-time IWA World Tag Team Champion with Kantaro Hoshino as the Yamaha Brothers. |
| 2007 | Shoji Kai (Motoyuki Kitazawa) | Winner of the 1976 Karl Gotch Cup. Famous as the debut opponent of many legends, including Kotetsu Yamamoto, Rusher Kimura, Masa Saito, Tatsumi Fujinami, Osamu Kido, Mitsuo Momota, Satoru Sayama (the original Tiger Mask) and Hiro Saito. |
| 2009 | Kuniaki Kobayashi | One of NJPW's top junior heavyweights of the 1980s and of a few to win the junior heavyweight titles in both New Japan and All Japan Pro Wrestling. |
| 2009 | Akira Maeda (Go Il-myeong) | Two-time IWGP Tag Team Champion. Founder of the Universal Wrestling Federation and Fighting Network Rings. |
| 2009 | Black Cat (Víctor Manuel Mar) | One-time Mexican National Junior Heavyweight Champion and Naucalpan Tag Team Champion. |
| 2010 | Animal Hamaguchi (Heigo Hamaguchi) | Trainer and two-time All Asia Tag Team Champion. Also four-time IWA World Tag Team Champion. |
| 2010 | Shinya Hashimoto | One of the Three Musketeers. Three-time IWGP Heavyweight and IWGP Tag Team Champion. Founder of Pro Wrestling Zero1. |
| 2011 | Don Arakawa (Makoto Arakawa) | One-time WWC Caribbean Tag Team Champion. Best known as an underdog and comedy wrestler. |

== Broadcasters ==
Domestic:

- TV Asahi (1973–present, currently broadcasting weekly highlights show World Pro-Wrestling and live specials)
- Fighting TV Samurai (1996–present, currently broadcasting live specials, retrospective shows and magazine show NJPW Battle DX)
- Abema (2014–present, online linear television service, live-streaming episodes of World Pro-Wrestling)

International (former):

- AXS TV (2014–19, 2022–24, United States, Canada, broadcast World Pro-Wrestling and major shows, dubbed with English commentary)
- Eurosport (mid '90s–2007, Europe, dubbed episodes of World Pro-Wrestling and major shows for various continental markets)
- The Wrestling Channel (2002–2005, UK & Ireland, dubbed and undubbed broadcasts of major shows)
- 1Sports (2020, Indian Subcontinent, broadcast the AXS version of World Pro-Wrestling)
- DSport/Eurosport (2017–2020, 2021, Indian Subcontinent, broadcast the AXS TV version of World Pro-Wrestling, Season 3–5)
- J-One (May 2018 – 2020, France, dubbed with French commentary)
- FX (2019–2020, South Korea, broadcasting the AXS TV version of World Pro-Wrestling)

International (current):

- The Roku Channel (2021–present, United States, United Kingdom and Canada broadcast World Pro-Wrestling and major shows, dubbed with English commentary)
- Fight Network (2016–2019, 2022–present, Canada, broadcasting the AXS version of World Pro-Wrestling)
- Extreme Sports Channel (2023–present, Europe, broadcast World Pro-Wrestling and major shows for various continental markets)

Worldwide:

- NJPW World (streaming service, in partnership with TV Asahi, broadcasting most NJPW shows live, as well as on-demand classic, documentary and anime content, as well as content from other promotions, beginning with promotional partners CMLL's weekly Super Viernes and AEW's weekly Dynamite and Collision shows)
- Triller TV (for Wrestle Kingdom and Dominion LIVE)

== See also ==
- Professional wrestling in Japan
- List of professional wrestling promotions in Japan
- Fire Pro Wrestling
