= Haruna Neko =

Japanese professional wrestler

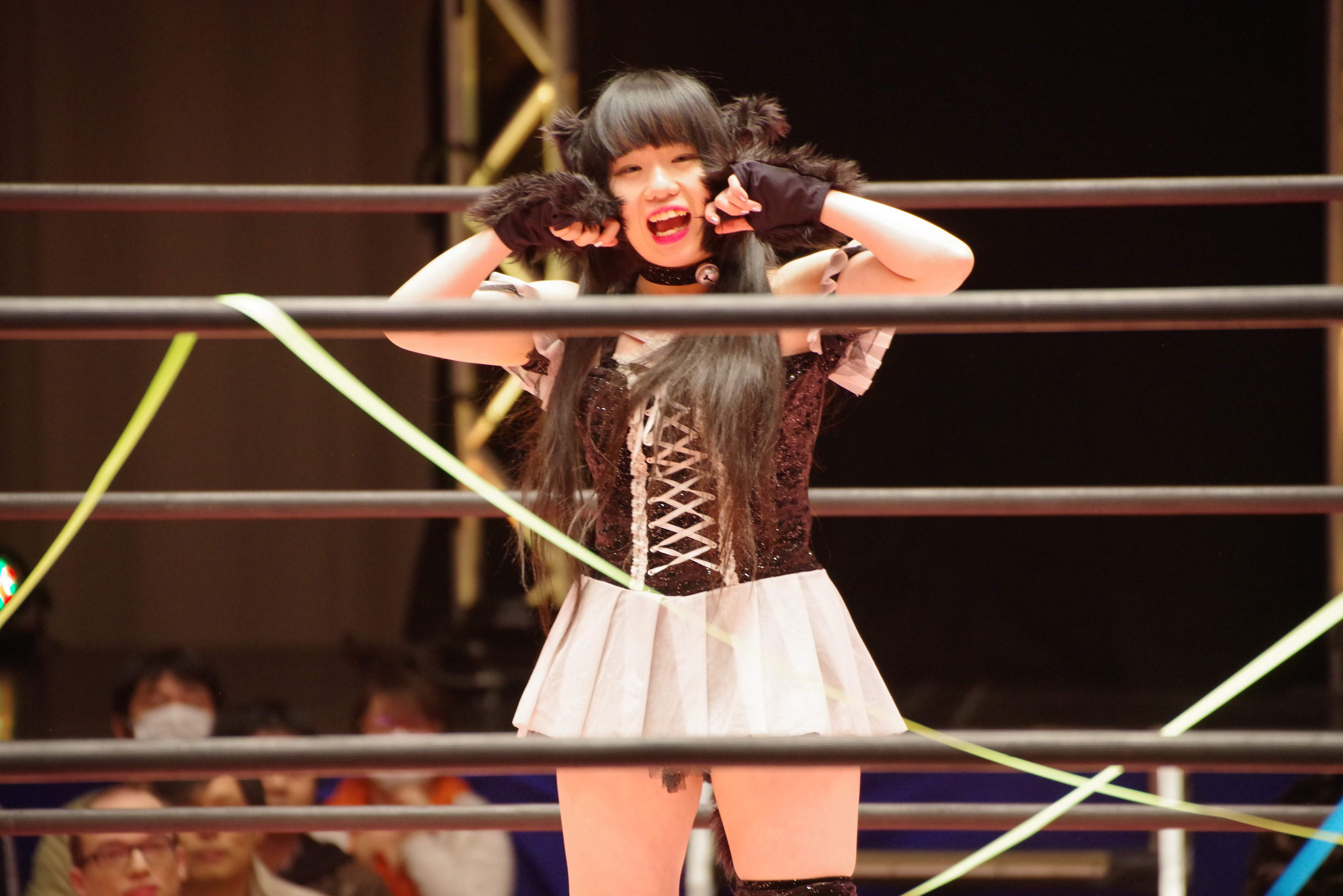
- Neko in March 2019

Personal information
- Born: 28 December 1998 (age 27) Yamanashi, Japan

Professional wrestling career
- Ring name: Haruna Neko Mil Nekocaras
- Billed height: 143 cm (4 ft 8 in)
- Trained by: Tokyo Joshi Pro-Wrestling
- Debut: 2018
- Retired: 2025

Haruna Neko (猫はるな, Neko Haruna) is a Japanese retired professional wrestler best known for her tenure with Tokyo Joshi Pro-Wrestling (TJPW) and for competing in various promotions from the Japanese independent scene.

== Professional wrestling career ==
=== Tokyo Joshi Pro-Wrestling (2018–2025) ===
Neko made her professional wrestling debut in Tokyo Joshi Pro-Wrestling at TJPW 5th Anniversary on November 17, 2018, where she fell short to Shoko Nakajima in singles competition.

Neko competed in various signature events of the promotion. In the Tokyo Princess Cup, she made her debut at the 2020 edition where she fell short to Suzume in the first rounds. At the 2021 edition, she fell short to Yuki Aino in the second rounds. Neko made her last appearance in the tournament at the 2022 edition where she fell short to Shoko Nakajima in the first rounds.

In the Wrestle Princess series of events, Kiryu made her first appearance at the first-ever event from November 7, 2020, where she teamed up with Marika Kobashi in a losing effort against Mahiro Kiryu and Pom Harajuku. At Wrestle Princess II on October 9, 2021, she teamed up with Mahiro Kiryu and Kaya Toribami in a losing effort against Ram Kaicho, Raku and Pom Harajuku. She made her last appearance ar Wrestle Princess III on October 9, 2022, where she teamed up with Toyo Mates (Mahiro Kiryu and Yuki Kamifuku) in a losing effort against Nao Kakuta, Yoshiko Hasegawa and Yuna Manase.

==== Injuries and retirement ====
Between September 2023 and October 2024, Neko took a long absence from in-ring competition as she was sidelined with a knee injury which required surgery. She recovered and eventually returned to the ring at TJPW Live Tour 2024 Autumn on October 27. In June 2025, Neko suffered a torn ACL which forced her to retire from in-ring competition. She had her last match at TJPW Autumn Victory In Shin-Kiba on September 27, 2025, where she defeated Mahiro Kiryu to briefly win the Ironman Heavymetalweight Championship before losing it back to the latter.

=== Independent circuit (2019–2022) ===
Neko often competed in promotions from various independent scenes as developmental talent sent by TJPW. She made her first appearance in the CyberFight Festival series of events co-promoted by TJPW, DDT and Noah at the first-ever pay-per-view of its kind from June 6, 2021, where she teamed up with BeeStar (Mirai Maiumi and Suzume), Moka Miyamoto and Arisu Endo to defeat Nao Kakuta, Raku, Pom Harajuku and Kaya Toribami. At CyberFight Festival 2022 on June 12, she teamed up with Hyper Misao, Yuki Aino, Yuuri and Pom Harajuku to defeat Nao Kakuta, Moka Miyamoto, Arisu Endo and Kaya Toribami.

== Championships and accomplishments ==
- DDT Pro-Wrestling
  - Ironman Heavymetalweight Championship (1 time)
