= Kenji Sakaguchi =

Japanese actor (born 1975)

- 坂口憲二
- Born: 8 November 1975 (age 50); Tokyo, Japan
- Occupation: Actor
- Years active: 2000–2018; 2023–present
- Agent: Black Tree
- Spouse: Unknown (m. 2014)
- Children: 3
- Family: Seiji Sakaguchi (father); Yukio Sakaguchi (brother)
- Website: officeblacktree.com/artist/kenji-sakaguchi/

Kenji Sakaguchi (坂口憲二, Sakaguchi Kenji; born 8 November 1975) is a Japanese actor. He has appeared in more than 30 films since 2000. He is the son of former professional wrestler Seiji Sakaguchi and the brother of current professional wrestler Yukio.

== Personal life ==
=== Family ===
His father, Seiji Sakaguchi, was a former professional wrestler and judoka known as the "Great Sakaguchi". Kenji himself is well-versed in martial arts, having attained a second-degree black belt in judo. His older brother, Yukio, was a self-employed mixed martial artist and professional wrestler.

=== Relationships and marriage ===
Sakaguchi dated actress Koyuki, with whom he co-starred in the 2002 television drama Serchin' for my Polestar, until 2005. In 2009, weekly magazines reported that he was dating model Yumi Sakurai. They dated for four years until their relationship ended in 2013.

A year later, on March 18, 2014, he married a non-celebrity woman who was reportedly in her early 30s and is from Kyoto. He revealed that they began dating in the summer of the previous year. The couple has three children together. A son was born on September 20, 2014, their second son on May 29, 2016, and their third child, a daughter, was born in 2018.

== Filmography ==
=== Film ===
Year	Title	Role	Notes	Ref.
2004	Silent Big Man	Seigo Yoshioka	Lead role	
2006	Memories of Tomorrow	Naoya Ito		
2026	Kyojo: Reunion	Kōji Yanagisawa		
2026	Kingdom 5: The Clash of Souls	Huan Yi		

=== Television ===
Year	Title	Role	Notes	Ref.
2000–01	Ikebukuro West Gate Park	Yamai (Doberman)		
2003	The Always the Two of Us	Kenta Morinaga	Lead role	
2003	Song of the Canefields	Isamu Hirayama	Television film	
2004	Pride	Yamato Hotta		
2004	Younger Brother	Tetsuya Watari		
2006–14	Iryū: Team Medical Dragon	Ryutaro Asada	Lead role; 4 seasons	
2012–25	Second to Last Love	Shinpei Nagakura	3 seasons	
2023	Kazama Kimichika: Kyojo Zero	Kōji Yanagisawa		

== Health ==
On 31 March 2018, Sakaguchi announced he was taking an indefinite hiatus from acting due to "idiopathic osteonecrosis of the femoral head".

In 2023, he resumed his entertainment activities. It was announced that he would appear in a TV drama for the first time in nine years.

== Awards and nominations ==
Year	Award	Category	Work(s)	Result	Ref.
2002	36th Elan d'or Awards	Newcomer of the Year	Himself	Won	
