= Kikansha Sensei =

- Film poster
- Directed by: Ryuichi Hiroki
- Written by: Shotaro Oikawa; Masato Kato
- Produced by: Naoya Narita; Yoshihisa Yamamoto; Seichirou Ishii
- Starring: Kenji Sakaguchi; Masaaki Sakai; Mitsuko Baisho; Nene Otsuka; Naoyuki Morita
- Cinematography: Kazuhiro Suzuki
- Edited by: Junichi Kikuchi
- Music by: Ryouichi Kuniyoshi
- Release date: July 31, 2004 (Japan)
- Running time: 123 minutes
- Country: Japan
- Language: Japanese

Kikansha Sensei (機関車先生, lit. "Locomotive Teacher", a.k.a. "Big Silent Man") is a 2004 Japanese-language film by Ryuichi Hiroki based on the best-selling book by Shizuka Ijuin.

== Plot ==
A young teacher, Seigo Fujioka, arrives at a school of only seven pupils on a small island where his mother grew up. Due to a kendo accident, Seigo has permanently lost his voice. The children are anxious to meet their new teacher, but are surprised to find he does not speak a word. They soon become attached to their new teacher, naming him "Locomotive Teacher" because he looks big and strong like the picture of a locomotive hanging in their classroom. The adults are upset by the fact that they received a defective teacher, and many are hostile towards the outsider. The bond between Seigo and his pupils grows day by day, and one by one the adults begin to accept him, until tragedy strikes the island. One pupil, Shuhei, loses his father when his fishing boat sinks. Seigo helps Shuhei to accept reality, and realize that true strength is within oneself. However, before he leaves the island, Seigo too will have to confront his own memories of the past to show his pupils what true courage is.

== Cast & characters ==
- Kenji Sakaguchi as Seigo Yoshioka
- Masaaki Sakai as Shuichiro Sako
- Mitsuko Baisho as Yone Abe
- Nene Otsuka as Yoshie Muroi
- Masatō Ibu as Jutaro Mimasaka
- Masami Sato as Mieko Sako
- Naoyuki Morita as Shuhei Nishimoto

== Release ==
=== Reviews ===
The film received generally favorable reviews, receiving praise for its cinematography and beautiful, authentic depictions of island life in Seto Naikai, where the film was shot. Mark Schilling of The Japan Times panned Sakaguchi's performance, stating, "This hunk of burnin' love, who comes from the worlds of fashion modeling and TV drama, complete with flawless cheekbones and flashing bedroom eyes, looks gorgeous on camera—but is in far over his head playing a role that would have challenged a much more accomplished actor. He poses stiffly in scenes where Sean Penn would have bared his soul." Writing for Variety, Russell Edwards' review praised the performance of the children, while regarding the adults' performances as "stiff".
