= Umanosuke Ueda =

Japanese professional wrestler (1940–2011)

Personal information
- Born: Hiroshi Ueda; 20 June 1940 Yatomi, Aichi, Japan
- Died: 21 December 2011 (aged 71)
- Cause of death: Respiratory failure

Professional wrestling career
- Ring name(s): Umanosuke Ueda; Mr. Ito; Great Ito; Tengu
- Billed height: 1.91 m (6 ft 3 in)
- Billed weight: 118 kg (260 lb)
- Debut: 1961
- Retired: 1998

Hiroshi Ueda (上田 裕司, Ueda Hiroshi; 20 June 1940 – 21 December 2011) was a Japanese professional wrestler, better known by his ring name Umanosuke Ueda (上田 馬之助, Ueda Umanosuke). During his wrestling career, Ueda primarily stood out for wrestling with bleached blonde hair, a practice which was rare in his day but later became more common. His ring name was inspired by samurai warrior and Shinsengumi member Umanosuke Ueda.

== Professional wrestling career ==
After debuting in the old Japan Pro Wrestling Alliance in 1961, he started the circuit in Los Angeles in 1966. In 1974, he joined Japan's International Pro Wrestling where he held the IWA World Heavyweight Championship from June 11, 1976, till July 28, 1976. Ueda was considered one of the first "traitor heels" in Japan, as he broke societal mores by dyeing his hair and using a brawling style, and teaming with a hated gaikokujin heel, Tiger Jeet Singh. The two men were the first team to win tag team titles in both New Japan Pro-Wrestling (the NWA North American Tag Team Championship) and All Japan Pro Wrestling (the NWA International Tag Team Championship).

Mr. Gannosuke, Tatsutoshi Goto and Toru Yano later based their "dye job brawler" ring personas on Ueda's style. More recently, Takaaki Watanabe has based his "Evil" persona on Ueda.

He later went on to appear as a henchman in the Japanese game show Takeshi's Castle up until the end of the show in the late '80s and also appeared in the movie Burst City.

In 1996, he was in a car accident, which left him paralyzed and eventually forced him to retire two years later.

Ueda died on December 21, 2011, from respiratory failure; he was 71 years old.

== Championships and accomplishments ==
- All Japan Pro Wrestling
  - NWA International Tag Team Championship (2 times) - with Kintarō Ōki (1) and Tiger Jeet Singh (1)
- International Wrestling Enterprise
  - IWA World Heavyweight Championship (1 time)
- Mid-South Sports
  - NWA Georgia Tag Team Championship (1 time) - with Chati Yokouchi
- New Japan Pro-Wrestling
  - Asia Tag Team Championship (1 time) - with Tiger Jeet Singh
  - NWA North American Tag Team Championship (Los Angeles/Japan version) (1 time) - with Tiger Jeet Singh
- NWA Big Time Wrestling
  - NWA World Tag Team Championship (1 time) - with Chati Yokouchi
- NWA Mid-America
  - NWA World Tag Team Championship (Mid-America version) (1 time) - with Tojo Yamamoto
- NWA Tri-State
  - NWA World Junior Heavyweight Championship (1 time)
- Tokyo Sports
  - Popularity Award (1978)
- Western States Sports
  - NWA Western States Tag Team Championship (1 time) - with Chati Yokouchi
  - NWA World Tag Team Championship (Amarillo version) (1 time) - with Chati Yokouchi
- World Wrestling Organization
  - WWO Heavyweight Championship (1 time)
