= NWA North American Tag Team Championship (Los Angeles/Japan version) =

Professional wrestling tag team championship

NWA North American Tag Team Championship (Los Angeles/Japan)

Details
- Promotion: NWA Hollywood Wrestling; New Japan Pro-Wrestling (NJPW)
- Date established: August, 1973
- Date retired: April 23, 1981
Statistics
- First champions: Johnny Powers and Pat Patterson
- Final champions: Riki Choshu and Seiji Sakaguchi
- Most reigns: As tag team (2 reigns): Antonio Inoki and Seiji Sakaguchi; Seiji Sakaguchi and Strong Kobayashi; As individual (5 reigns): Seiji Sakaguchi
- Longest reign: Riki Choshu and Seiji Sakaguchi (647 days)

The Los Angeles and Japan version of the NWA North American Tag Team Championship was a major tag team championship that was primarily defended in the National Wrestling Alliance (NWA) affiliated New Japan Pro-Wrestling (NJPW) and NWA Hollywood Wrestling promotions. The title essentially served as NJPW primary tag team title though it was also recognized and occasionally defended in the Los Angeles area. This title was the second NWA sanctioned title to be named the "NWA North American Tag Team Championship" and was retired on April 23, 1981, after announcement of the IWGP, a new governing body, which would promote their own-branded championships within NJPW.

== Title history ==
Key
No.	Overall reign number
Reign	Reign number for the specific team—reign numbers for the individuals are in parentheses, if different
Days	Number of days held

No.	Champion	Championship change			Reign statistics		Notes	Ref.
No.	Champion	Date	Event	Location	Reign	Days	Notes	Ref.
NWA Hollywood Wrestling and New Japan Pro Wrestling (NJPW)
1	Johnny Powers and Pat Patterson	August 1973	N/A	N/A	1	(Note: The length of the reign is too uncertain to calculate.)	Powers and Patterson were recognized in Los Angeles and Japan as champions.	
2	Karl Von Schotz and Kurt Von Hess	May 1974	Unknown	Unknown	1			
3	Antonio Inoki and Seiji Sakaguchi	August 16, 1974	Hollywood Wrestling house show	Los Angeles, CA	1	350		
—	Vacated	August 1, 1975	—	—	—	—	The championship was vacated after the Inoki and Sakaguchi wrestled Hollywood Blonds (Dale Roberts and Jerry Brown) to a no contest.	
4	HB Hollywood Blonds (Dale Roberts and Jerry Brown)	September 22, 1975	Toukon Series 1975	Nagoya, Japan	1	10	Defeat Seiji Sakaguchi and Strong Kobayashi to win the vacant championship.	
5	Antonio Inoki and Seiji Sakaguchi	October 2, 1975	Toukon Series 1975	Osaka, Japan	2			
—	Vacated	January 1976	—	—	—	—	The championship was vacated after Antonio Inoki chose to focus on martial arts competition.	
6	Seiji Sakaguchi (3) and Strong Kobayashi	February 5, 1976	New Year Golden Series 1976	Sapporo, Japan	1	363	Defeated Tiger Jeet Singh and Voodoo Mulumba in a tournament final to win the vacant championship.	
7	Tiger Jeet Singh and Umanosuke Ueda	February 2, 1977	New Year Golden Series 1977	Osaka, Japan	1	176		
8	Seiji Sakaguchi (4) and Strong Kobayashi	July 28, 1977	Asia Champion Series	Fukuoka, Japan	2	616		
9	Hiro Matsuda and Masa Saito	April 5, 1979	Big Fight Series	Tokyo, Japan	1	71		
10	Riki Choshu and Seiji Sakaguchi (5)	June 15, 1979	Hollywood Wrestling house show	Los Angeles, CA	1	678		
—	Deactivated	April 23, 1981	—	—	—	—	The championship was retired after the announcement of the IWGP, a new governing body that would promote their own-branded championships within NJPW. NJPW later introduces the IWGP Tag Team Championship.	

== See also ==
- National Wrestling Alliance
- WWF International Tag Team Championship
- IWGP Tag Team Championship
