= Himawari Sato =

Japanese professional wrestler

Himawari
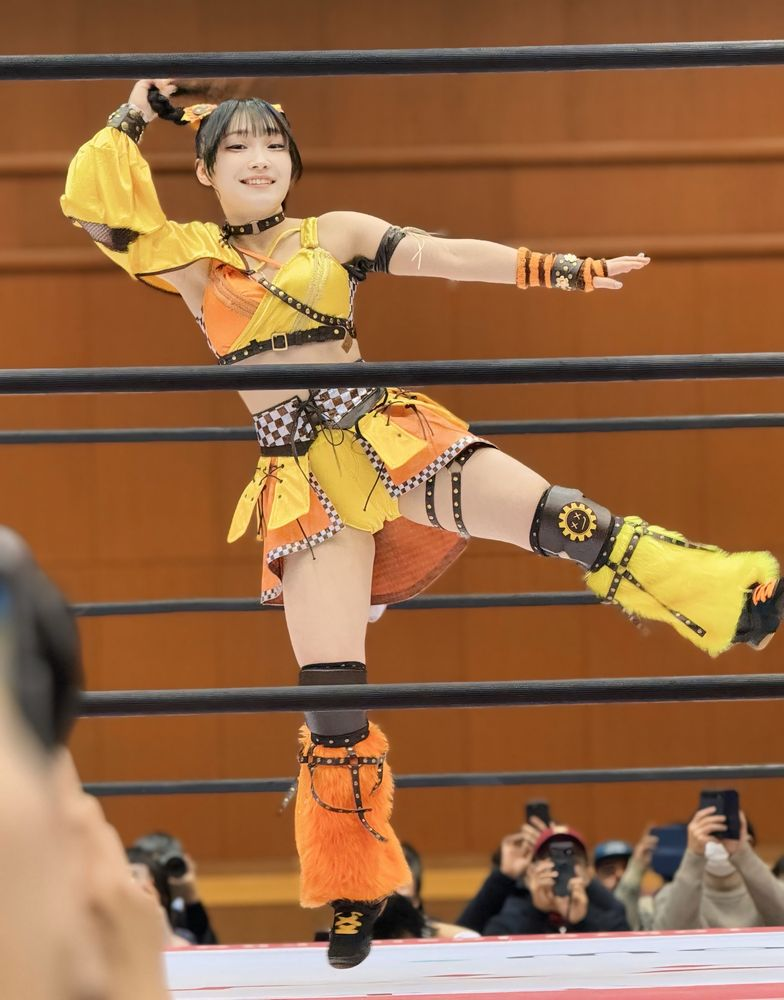
- Himawari in January 2025

Personal information
- Born: 18 December 1997 (age 28) Tokyo, Japan
- Education: Shobi University

Professional wrestling career
- Ring name: Himawari
- Billed height: 155 cm (5 ft 1 in)
- Trained by: Tokyo Joshi Pro-Wrestling
- Debut: 2022

Himawari Sato (佐藤向日葵, Satō Himawari) better known mononymously by her ring name Himawari (ヒマワリ, Himawari) (often stylized as HIMAWARI) is a Japanese professional wrestler and stage actress signed to Tokyo Joshi Pro-Wrestling (TJPW). She is also known for sporadically competing in various promotions from the Japanese independent scene.

== Early life ==
Sato graduated from the Theater Department of Kanto International High School in March 2017. One month later, she enrolled in the Musical Course in the Department of Stage Expression of Shobi University. While still a student, she performed in independent stage performances at small theaters with her university classmates.

Sato joined the theater company "Kuuhaku Genome", co-founded by playwrights Grim Enomoto and Shion Tsuchiya while she was still a university student, and began working as a member of the company on August 1, 2019. She Graduated from Shobi University in March 2020. After graduation, she began her career as a stage actor. On November 11, 2020, due to the impacts of the COVID-19 pandemic, the "Kuuhaku Genome" company disbanded. After that, Sato became a freelancer and continued her work as a stage actor mainly in small theaters.

== Professional wrestling career ==
=== Actwres girl'Z (2022) ===
Sato made her professional wrestling debut in Actwres girl'Z at AWG ACTwrestling In Korakuen Hall on August 12, 2022, where she teamed up with Naru to defeat Kyoka Iwai and Rico Fukunaga in tag team competition. She would only wrestle one more match for the promotion before getting released.

=== Tokyo Joshi Pro-Wrestling (2023–present) ===
Sato made her debut in Tokyo Joshi Pro-Wrestling at TJPW Tokyo Joshi Pro '23 on January 4, where she fell short to Yuki Aino in singles competition. She continued to chase success in the promotion. At TJPW Yes! Wonderland 2024 on May 6, 2024, she teamed up with Wakana Uehara and unsuccessfully challenged Daisy Monkey (Arisu Endo and Suzume) for the Princess Tag Team Championship. At TJPW Golden Week Fan Appreciation Day on May 3, 2025, she unsuccessfully challenged Suzume for the International Princess Championship.

Sato competed in various signature events in the promotion. In the Tokyo Princess Cup, she made her debut at the 2025 edition where she fell short to Haru Kazashiro in the first rounds. At Wrestle Princess IV on October 9, 2023, she teamed up with Arisu Endo and Kaya Toribami to defeat Harukaze, Riara and Yoshiko Hasegawa. At Wrestle Princess V on September 22, 2024, she teamed up with Toribami and Yoshiko Hasegawa to defeat Kira Summer, Chika Nanase and Uta Takami. At Wrestle Princess VI on September 20, 2025, she fell short to Aja Kong in singles competition.

=== Independent circuit (2024–present) ===
Sato competed for the first time outside of Japan at EVE 125: EVE x TJPW, a cross-over event promoted by TJPW in partnership with Pro-Wrestling: EVE on August 24, 2024, where she fell short to Mahiro Kiryu. At Battle Riot VII, an event promoted by Major League Wrestling on April 5, 2025, Sato fell short to Janai Kai.
