= Tokyo Joshi Pro-Wrestling =

Japanese women's wrestling promotion

- Acronym: TJPW
- Founded: June 4, 2012
- Style: Joshi puroresu Queen's Road with Ark
- Headquarters: Tokyo, Japan
- Founders: Tetsuya Koda; Nozomi
- Parent: CyberFight (CyberAgent)
- Sister: DDT Pro-Wrestling; Pro Wrestling Noah
- Website: www.tjpw.jp

Tokyo Joshi Pro-Wrestling (東京女子プロレス, Tōkyō Joshi Puroresu; TJPW) is a Japanese joshi puroresu or women's professional wrestling promotion founded in 2012 as a sister promotion of DDT Pro-Wrestling. Initially running alongside other shows such as live music and other idol performances, it became its own standalone promotion starting on February 28, 2015.

As of 2024, TJPW is promoted under the CyberFight banner as a sister promotion to both DDT Pro-Wrestling and Pro Wrestling Noah.

== History ==
=== Formation (2012–2013) ===
On June 4, 2012, Tokyo Joshi Pro was announced by DDT Pro-Wrestling. Set to be run by former Ice Ribbon and NEO Japan Ladies Pro-Wrestling promoter and booker Tetsuya Koda and wrestler Nozomi, the promotion was established in late 2012 and thus a recruitment process began for wrestlers. Four of the first wrestlers recruited were Miyu Yamashita, Shoko Nakajima, Kanna and Chikage Kiba. The training of the wrestlers was mostly handled by Nozomi herself, with help from DDT wrestler Kyohei Mikami. Nozomi left DDT on November 30, 2012, but on the same day the trainees were introduced to the public in a press conference and it was announced they would debut in 2013.

=== Early years (2013–2015) ===
Tokyo Joshi Pro Wrestling's debut show took place on January 30, 2013, at Akihabara Twin Box in Tokyo. The show featured just two matches, a sambo exhibition between trainee Chikage Kiba and DDT referee and former sambo competitor Daisuke Kiso, and a singles match between trainees Miyu Yamashita and Kanna. The show did not use a wrestling ring, and instead all matches took place on training mats, similar to the Ice Ribbon promotion in its early years. Along with wrestling matches, the debut show featured live music from idol units. As TJP's roster was very small at the start, most of their early shows followed this same formula and only ran small venues. Entry to their first few shows was free as a way of introducing themselves to a bigger audience, and their first paid show was held on April 26. As their roster of trainees expanded in 2014, TJPW began including more matches on their cards, and began using a ring. They also ran a show with an appearance from voice actress/wrestler Ai Shimizu in November 2014. TJPW held its first full show without an idol performance on February 28, 2015 at Shinjuku Face. At the show, Ai Shimizu and Saki Akai confirmed they would be competing with the promotion regularly, and more trainees debuted at the show.

=== Rise in popularity (2016–present) ===
On January 4, 2016, TJPW held its first ever show in Korakuen Hall, a famed wrestling venue in puroresu. Main evented by Miyu Yamashita defeating Shoko Nakajima to become the first ever Tokyo Princess of Princess Champion, it also featured the debut of Yuu and an appearance from American wrestler Candice LeRae. In the spring of 2016, Ai Shimizu and Erin announced their departure from the promotion, however, the summer was a success for the promotion, and TJPW earned a broadcasting deal to be shown on idol-centric channel Pigoo.

On January 4, 2017, TJPW held its second annual Korakuen show, main evented by Yuu retaining the Tokyo Princess of Princess title over Shoko Nakajima. On May 29, an audition was held for four young wrestlers to form a wrestling/idol group to be known as the "Up-Up Girls". On July 20, four women were picked and began training to wrestle shortly after. On December 4, the Up-Up Girls debuted with an idol performance, but didn't appear in ring until January 4, 2018.

On January 4, 2018, TJP's third annual Korakuen show proved to be a success, drawing over 1000 fans for the first time ever. The show was also broadcast on AbemaTV for the first time, as well as DDT's streaming service DDT Universe. The show was main evented by TJPW ace Miyu Yamashita defeating Reika Saiki to win back the Tokyo Princess of Princess Championship. On February 28, the TJPW show from Shinjuku Face was once again broadcast on AbemaTV, and it was announced Abema had picked up TJPW to broadcast it regularly. This also marked the end of TJPW being broadcast on Pigoo. On November 1, 2018, the three trainee rules were officially bought to an end, allowing wrestlers to drink, smoke and have relationships on their own accord.

The 2019 January 4 show was once again a success, drawing 1,300 fans to Korakuen Hall.

On July 16, 2019, TJPW announced, via their Twitter account, a new title called the International Princess Championship. They also announced that the Tokyo Princess of Princess Championship and the Tokyo Princess Tag Team Championship would be dropping "Tokyo" from their names.

On March 31, 2023, TJPW held their first event in the United States in Los Angeles, California at the Globe Theater. On December 15, TJPW was announced as one of the founding members of the United Japan Pro-Wrestling alliance, a joint effort to further develop professional wrestling in Japan through promotion and organization, with Seiji Sakaguchi being named as the chairman of the project.

== Roster ==
=== Wrestlers ===
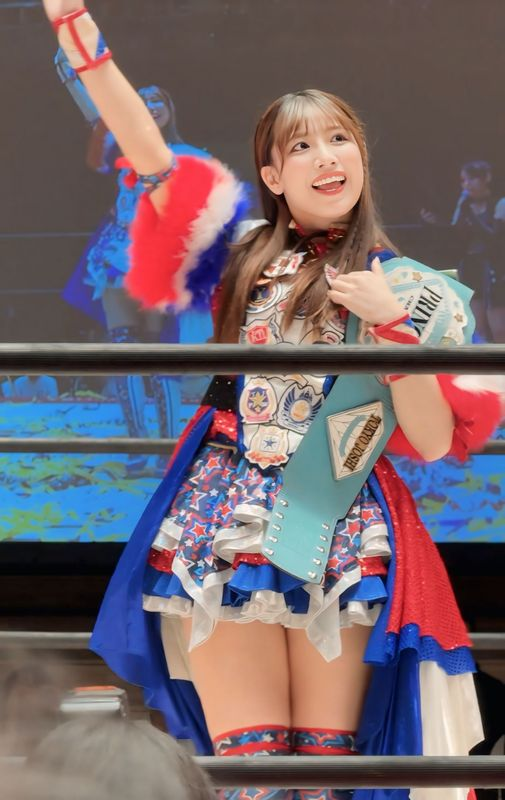
Yuki Arai

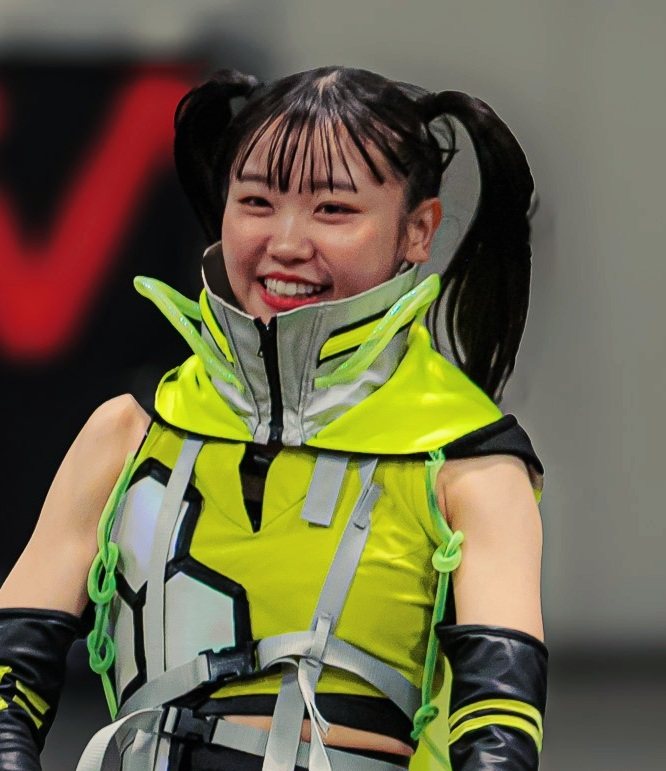
Suzume

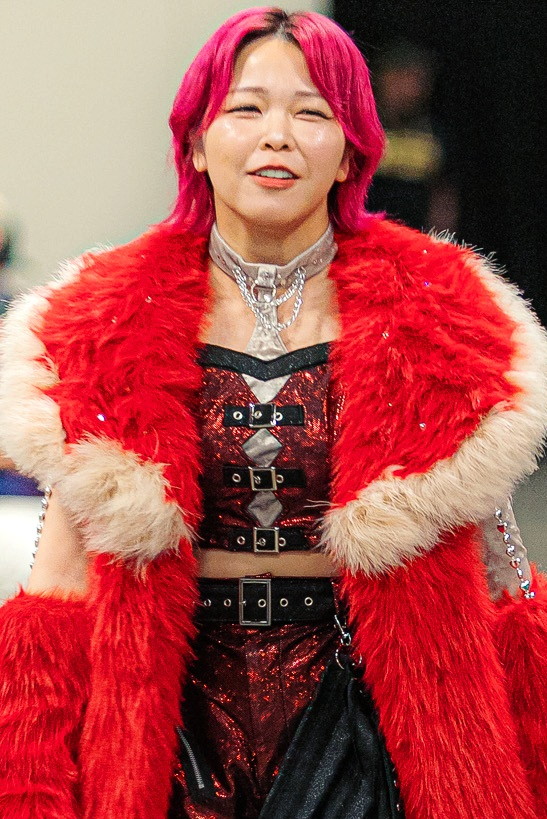
Yuki Aino

Ring name	Real name	Notes
Arisu Endo	Unknown	
Chieri Sakimori	Unknown	
Chika Nanase	Unknown	
Haru Kazashiro	Unknown	Princess Tag Team Champion
Himawari	Himawari Sato	
Hyper Misao	Unknown	
Kira Summer	Unknown	
Mahiro Kiryu	Unknown	
Mifu Ashida	Unknown	
Miu Watanabe	Unknown	Up Up Girls (Pro Wrestling)
Miyu Yamashita	Miyu Yamashita	Pro-Wrestling: EVE International Champion
Mizuki	Mizuki Kaminade	
Momo Sato	Momo Sato	Harajuku LAND
Pom Harajuku	Unknown	
Raku	Unknown	Up Up Girls (Pro-Wrestling)
Ren Konatsu	Unknown	
Rika Tatsumi	Unknown	
Sakura Hattori	Unknown	
Shino Suzuki	Unknown	Up Up Girls (Pro-Wrestling)
Shion Kanzaki	Unknown	
Shoko Nakajima	Shoko Nakajima	SETUP All-Asia Women's Champion
Suzume	Unknown	International Princess Champion
Toga	Unknown	
Uta Takami	Unknown	Up Up Girls (Pro-Wrestling)
Wakana Uehara	Wakana Uehara	One Eight Promotion
Yui Musubi	Unknown	
Yuki Aino	Unknown	Princess Tag Team Champion
Yuki Arai	Yuki Arai	Princess of Princess Champion
Yuki Kamifuku	Yuki Kamifuku	

=== Alumni ===
Ring name	Real name	Notes
Akane Miura	Unknown	Graduated on March 25, 2017
Ayumi Takada	Ayumi Takada	Retired on March 19, 2014
Azusa Takigawa	Unknown	Graduated on October 27, 2018
Chikage Kiba	Unknown	Graduated on March 27, 2018
Erin	Eri Kato	Retired on May 28, 2016
Haruna Neko	Unknown	Retired on September 8, 2025
Hikari Noa	Unknown	Up Up Girls (Pro-Wrestling), Graduated on May 19, 2024
Himawari Unagi	Unknown	Contract expired September 30, 2020
Ivy Steele	Fiona Mercer	Returned to England after August 9, 2025
Kanna	Kanna Shinmei	Graduated on September 22, 2016
Maho Kurone	Unknown	Graduated on July 30, 2018
Maki Itoh	Maki Itoh	Contract expired on August 26, 2025
Marika Kobashi	Unknown	Graduated on April 17, 2022
Mina Shirakawa	Unknown	Resigned on September 21, 2020
Mirai Maiumi	Mirai Itō	Resigned on August 31, 2021
Mizuho	Unknown	Graduated on January 11, 2017
Natsumi Maki	Natsumi Maki	Resigned on September 21, 2020
Nodoka Tenma	Unknown	Retired on March 26, 2022
Nonoko	Unknown	Graduated on February 3, 2018
Nozomi	Nozomi Dai	Retired on November 30, 2012
Pinano Pipipipi	Unknown	Up Up Girls (Pro-Wrestling), Graduated on April 5, 2019
Reika Saiki	Reika Saiki	Resigned on June 22, 2019
Saki Akai	Saki Akai	Retired on November 12, 2023
Shiori Sena	Unknown	Graduated on April 24, 2021
Yoshiko Hasegawa	Yoshiko Hasegawa	Retired on July 8, 2025
Yuka Sakazaki	Unknown	Graduated on December 6, 2023
Yuu	Unknown	Resigned on December 1, 2018

=== Notable guests ===
Ring name	Real name	Notes
Aja Kong	Erika Shishido	Freelancer
Alex Windsor	Alice Olivia Walker	Signed with All Elite Wrestling
Billie Starkz	Lilian Bridget	Signed with All Elite Wrestling
Chris Brookes	Chris Brookes	Signed with DDT Pro Wrestling
Heidi Howitzer	Sarah Slack	
Janai Kai	Janai Ruiz	
Lana Austin	LeeAnn Adele Austin	
Léi Yïng Lee	Xia Zhao	Signed with TNA Wrestling
Masha Slamovich	Anna Khozina	Signed with TNA Wrestling
Max the Impaler	Max Lindsey	Freelancer
Mika Iwata	Mika Shirahime	Signed with Sendai Girls' Pro Wrestling
Miyuki Takase	Miyuki Takase	Signed with Sendai Girls' Pro Wrestling
Minoru Suzuki	Minoru Suzuki	Freelancer
Nyla Rose	Brandi Hicks Degroat	Signed with All Elite Wrestling
Riho	Unknown	Signed with All Elite Wrestling
Ram Kaicho	Unknown	Signed with Wrestling of Darkness 666
Rhio	Rhianna McDonnell	
Rina Shingaki	Rina Shingaki	
Su Yung	Vannarah Riggs	
Sareee	Sari Fujimura	Freelancer
Thunder Rosa	Melissa Cervantes	Signed with All Elite Wrestling
Yuuri	Unknown	Signed with Ganbare☆Pro-Wrestling

== Championships and accomplishments ==
=== Current championships ===
Championship	Current champion(s)	Reign	Date won	Days held	Successful defenses	Location	Notes	Ref.
Princess of Princess Championship	Yuki Arai	1	March 29, 2026	222	4	Tokyo, Japan	Defeated Miu Watanabe at Grand Princess.	
International Princess Championship	Suzume	2	March 29, 2026	222	4	Tokyo, Japan	Defeated Mirai at Grand Princess.	
Princess Tag Team Championship	Shunrai Rekka Prism Greed (Yuki Aino and Haru Kazashiro)	1 (3,1)	October 2, 2026	35	0	Tokyo, Japan	Defeated Hakuchuumu (Miu Watanabe and Rika Tatsumi) at Wrestle Princess VII.	

=== Other accomplishments ===
Tournament	Last winner(s)	Date won	Notes
Tokyo Princess Cup	Suzume	August 23, 2026	Single elimination tournament
"Futari wa Princess" Max Heart Tournament	Ober Eats (Yuki Kamifuku and Wakana Uehara)	February 14, 2026	Single elimination tournament
Next Generation Tournament	Uta Takami	October 26, 2025	Format varies by number of participants

=== Notable events ===
#	Event	Date	City	Venue	Attendance	Main event	Ref.
1	Wrestle Princess I	November 7, 2020	Tokyo, Japan	Tokyo Dome City Hall	N/A	Yuka Sakazaki (c) vs. Mizuki for the Princess of Princess Championship	
2	Wrestle Princess II	October 9, 2021	Tokyo, Japan	Ota City General Gymnasium	914	Miyu Yamashita (c) vs. Maki Itoh for the Princess of Princess Championship	
3	Wrestle Princess III	October 9, 2022	Tokyo, Japan	Tokyo Dome City Hall	1,007	Shoko Nakajima (c) vs. Yuka Sakazaki for the Princess of Princess Championship	
4	Wrestle Princess IV	October 9, 2023	Tokyo, Japan	Tama Mirai Messe	868	Mizuki (c) vs. Miyu Yamashita for the Princess of Princess Championship	
5	Wrestle Princess V	September 22, 2024	Chiba, Japan	Makuhari Messe Hall	756	Miu Watanabe (c) vs. Ryo Mizunami for the Princess of Princess Championship	
6	Wrestle Princess VI	September 20, 2025	Tokyo, Japan	Ota City General Gymnasium	1,217	Mizuki (c) vs. Miu Watanabe for the Princess of Princess Championship	
7	Wrestle Princess VII	October 3rd, 2026	Tokyo, Japan	Ota City General Gymnasium	1,357	Yuki Arai (c) vs. Suzume for the Princess of Princess Championship	

=== Grand Slam champions ===
In TJPW, the Grand Slam consists of all the available titles promoted by the company. They are the Princess of Princess Championship, the Princess Tag Team Championship, and the International Princess Championship. On March 18, 2023, during the Grand Princess event, Rika Tatsumi became the first Grand Slam champion in TJPW's history.

Text
Dates in **bold**	The date the wrestler completed the Grand Slam

Champion	Primary championship	Secondary championship	Tag team championship
Champion	Princess of Princess Championship	International Princess Championship	Princess Tag Team Championship
Rika Tatsumi	January 4, 2021	**March 18, 2023**	November 3, 2019 (with Miu Watanabe)
Miu Watanabe	**March 31, 2024**	October 9, 2022	November 3, 2019 (with Rika Tatsumi)
Yuki Arai	**March 29, 2026**	January 4, 2024	July 9, 2022 (with Saki Akai)
