= Yoshiko Hasegawa =

Japanese professional wrestler

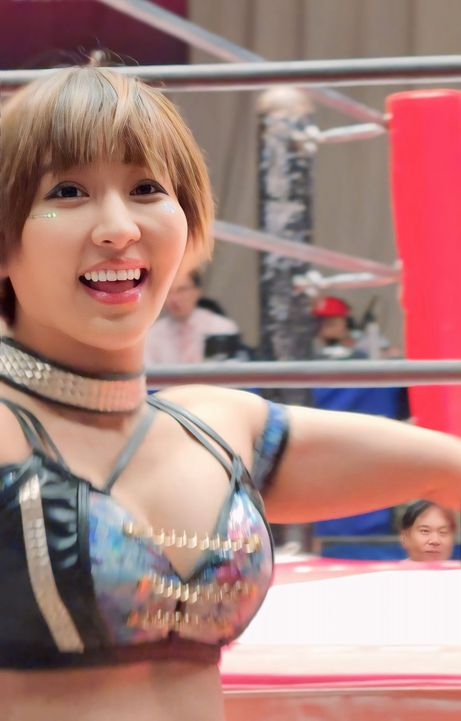
- Hasegawa in 2024

Personal information
- Born: 28 February 1987 (age 39) Sayama, Japan

Professional wrestling career
- Ring name: Yoshiko Hasegawa Yoppy
- Billed height: 150 cm (4 ft 11 in)
- Billed weight: 47 kg (104 lb)
- Trained by: Yumiko Hotta
- Debut: 2019
- Retired: 2025

Yoshiko Hasegawa (長谷川美子, Hasegawa Yoshiko) (born 28 February 1987) is a Japanese retired professional wrestler best known for her tenures with promotions from the Japanese independent scene such as Tokyo Joshi Pro-Wrestling (TJPW), Actwres girl'Z and Ice Ribbon.

== Professional wrestling career ==
=== Japanese independent circuit (2019–2025) ===
Hasegawa made her professional wrestling debut in Actwres girl'Z at a house show promoted on November 6, 2019, where she fell short to Tsukasa Fujimoto in singles competition.

=== Tokyo Joshi Pro-Wrestling (2022–2025) ===
Hasegawa is best known for her time with Tokyo Joshi Pro-Wrestling. She made her debut in the promotion at Wrestle Princess III on October 9, 2022, where she teamed up with Nao Kakuta and Yuna Manase to defeat Haruna Neko and Toyo Mates (Mahiro Kiryu and Yuki Kamifuku). She continued to work sporadically for the promotion, having competed in various signature events. At Wrestle Princess IV on October 9, 2023, Hasegawa teamed up with Harukaze and Riara in a losing effort against Arisu Endo, Himawari and Kaya Toribami.

On 28 August 2024, Hasegawa announced that she was set to become a regular wrestler of the Tokyo Joshi Pro-Wrestling roster. At Wrestle Princess V on September 22, 2024, she teamed up with Kaya Toribami and Himawari to defeat Kira Summer, Chika Nanase and Uta Takami.

On 28 February 2025, Hasegawa held a self-produced wrestling show in Tokyo Square in Itabashi for the first time.

On 27 March 2025, Hasegawa announced her retirement from professional wrestling on 8 July. At TJPW Spring Tour 2025 In Nerima on May 31, 2025, Hasegawa unsuccessfully challenged Suzume for the International Princess Championship. Three days before her retirement on 5 July, she won her only singles championship, winning the Ironman Heavymetalweight Championship by pinning previous champion Riara. On 8 July, Hasegawa wrestled her retirement match, a two-out-of-three-falls 1-on-27 handicap match against the rest of the TJPW roster. During the course of this match, she lost the Ironman Heavymetalweight Championship to Suzume.

== Championships and accomplishments ==
- Best Body Japan Pro-Wrestling
  - BBW Joshi Tag Team Championship (1 time) – with Erina Yamanaka
- DDT Pro-Wrestling
  - Ironman Heavymetalweight Championship (1 time)
