= Seiji Sakaguchi =

Japanese professional wrestler and judoka (born 1942)

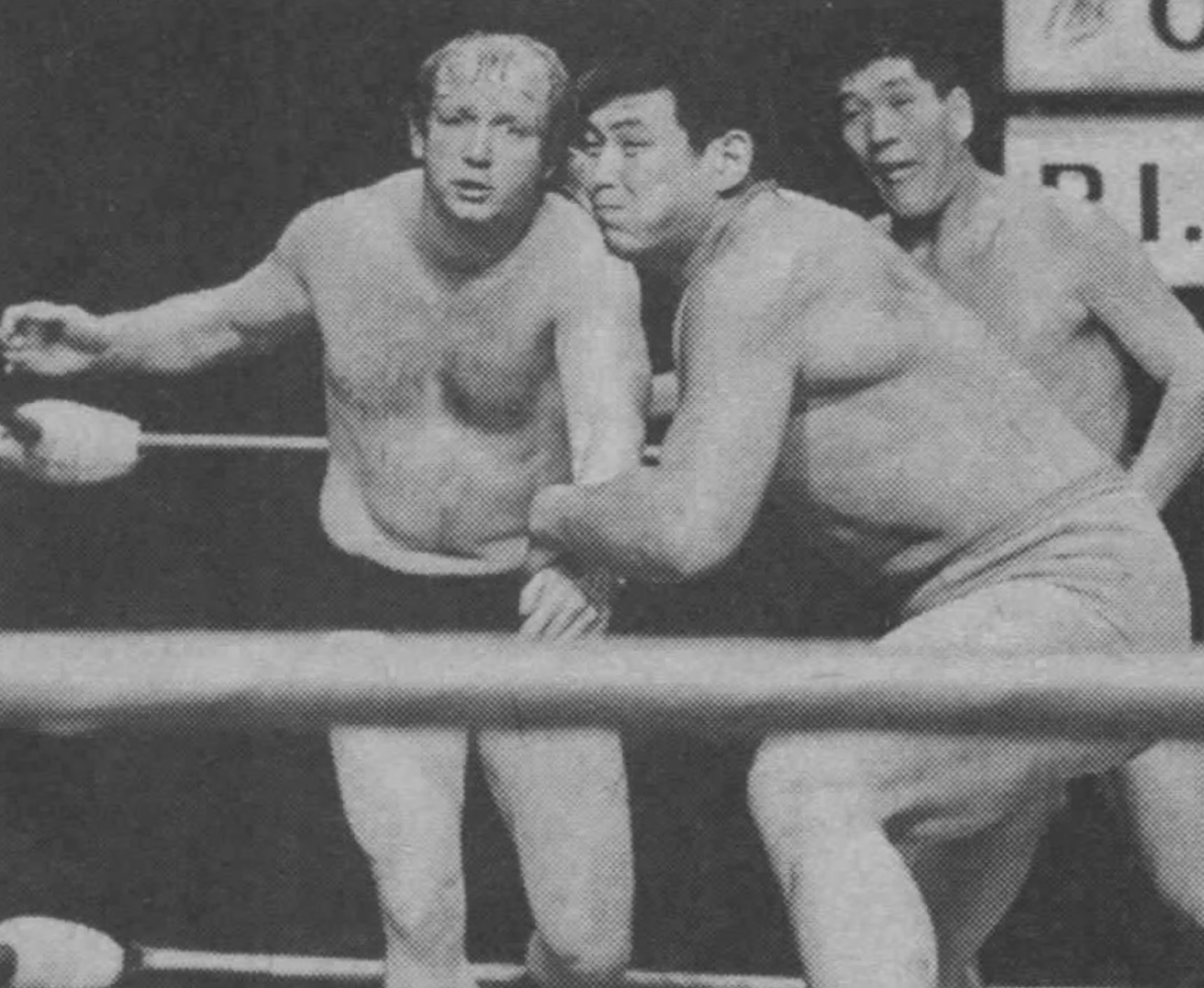
- Sakaguchi (center) along with Dory Funk, Jr. (left) and Giant Baba (right), c. 1973.

Personal information
- Born: Seiji Sakaguchi; February 17, 1942 (age 84) Kurume, Fukuoka, Japan
- Children: Kenji Sakaguchi; Yukio Sakaguchi

Professional wrestling career
- Ring name(s): Big Saka; Giant Saka; Great Saka; Great Sakaguchi; Mighty Saka; Seiji Sakaguchi
- Billed height: 196 cm (6 ft 5 in)
- Billed weight: 125 kg (276 lb)
- Billed from: Tokyo, Japan
- Trained by: Karl Gotch; Michiaki Yoshimura
- Debut: 5 August 1967
- Retired: 15 March 1990

Seiji Sakaguchi
Medal record

Representing Japan

Men's Black Belt Judo

World Championships
Bronze medal – third place	1965 Rio de Janeiro	+80 kg

Seiji Sakaguchi (坂口征二, Sakaguchi Seiji; born February 17, 1942) is a Japanese retired professional wrestler and judoka, Sakaguchi holds a 7th dan red and white belt in judo. Sakaguchi was a mainstay of New Japan Pro-Wrestling (NJPW) and also competed for the World Wide Wrestling Federation and the National Wrestling Alliance. His sons are professional wrestler and mixed martial arts fighter Yukio Sakaguchi and television actor Kenji Sakaguchi. Sakaguchi currently works for New Japan as an advisor.

== Judo career ==
Before becoming a professional wrestler, Sakaguchi was a judoka with a fifth degree black belt and won the 1965 All Japan Judo Championship. Coach Koji Sone was accused by Anton Geesink's teammates in the 1965 World Judo Championships of having Sakaguchi throw the match against the more rested Matsunaga in order to allow Matsunaga take on the weary Geesink in the final round.

== Professional wrestling career ==
Sakaguchi debuted in August 1967 for the Japan Wrestling Association. When JWA closed down in 1973, he joined New Japan Pro-Wrestling. He retired from the ring in March 1990. He was the president of the National Wrestling Alliance from 1992 to 1993.

At age 61, Seiji Sakaguchi came out of retirement to team up with Masahiro Chono against Yoshihiro Takayama and Shinya Makabe on September 14, 2003.

== Acting career ==
Sakaguchi appeared in the 1982 American film Forced Vengeance. His role was a minor one, though he did appear in the film's climactic fight scene, battling star Chuck Norris.

== Championships and accomplishments ==
- Cauliflower Alley Club
  - Other honoree (1996)
- European Wrestling Union
  - EWU World Super Heavyweight Championship (1 time)
- Japan Wrestling Association
  - All Asia Tag Team Championship (1 time) - with Michiaki Yoshimura
  - NWA International Tag Team Championship (2 time) - with Giant Baba (1 time) and Kintarō Ōki (1 time)
  - NWA United National Championship (1 time)
- New Japan Pro-Wrestling
  - Asia Tag Team Championship (1 time) - with Strong Kobayashi
  - NWA North American Tag Team Championship (Los Angeles/Japan version) (3 times) - with Antonio Inoki (1 time) and Strong Kobayashi (2 times)
  - NWF North American Heavyweight Championship (1 time)
  - WWF North American Heavyweight Championship (1 time, final)
  - World League (1976-1977)
  - Greatest 18 Club inductee
  - Greatest Wrestlers (Class of 2007)
- NWA Hollywood Wrestling
  - NWA North American Tag Team Championship (Los Angeles/Japan version) (2 times) - with Antonio Inoki (1 time) and Riki Choshu (1 time)
  - NWA United National Championship (1 time)
  - World Tag League (1971) - with Antonio Inoki
  - World Tag League (1972) - with Akihisa Takachiho
- NWA Polynesian Wrestling
  - NWA Polynesian Pacific Tag Team Championship (1 time) - with Lars Anderson
- Pro Wrestling Illustrated
  - PWI ranked him # 146 of the 500 best singles wrestlers of the PWI Years in 2003
- Tokyo Sports
  - Best Tag Team Award (1975) with Antonio Inoki
  - Best Tag Team Award (1976) with Strong Kobayashi
  - Fighting Spirit Award (1977)
  - Lifetime Achievement Award (1990, 2012)
  - Outstanding Performance Award (1976)
  - Special Award (2003)
